= United States Curling Association Hall of Fame =

Hall of fame in Stevens Point, Wisconsin

The United States Curling Association Hall of Fame was started in 1984 to recognize and honor individuals and teams that have achieved extraordinary distinction in curling or have made major contribution to the development of curling in the United States. It is operated by the United States Curling Association (USCA), the governing body for curling in the United States. The Hall of Fame is housed at the USCA headquarters in Stevens Point, Wisconsin.

There have been 45 individuals and 4 teams inducted into the Hall of Fame.

The first inductee was Bud Somerville, 2-time world champion and 2-time Olympian. Somerville is also included as skip of two of the four teams to have been inducted to the Hall of Fame, the 1965 World Men's Championship team and the 1975 World Men's Championship team. The other two teams that have been inducted are the 1976 World Men's Championship team and the 1978 World Men's Championship team.

The Hall of Fame selection committee meets annually to choose inductees. Inductees are categorized into one of three categories: Curler recognizes an individual or team for their competitive success, Builder recognizes an individual for their contribution to curling in the United States, or Curler/Builder which recognizes an individual who has combined the two previous categories.

== Members ==
Year	Category	Hall of Fame inductee	Team members, if applicable (order: skip, third, second, lead)
1984	Curler	Bud Somerville	
1988	Builder	Ted Childs	
1988	Curler/Builder	Glenn Harris	
1988	Builder	Hughston McBain	
1988	Builder	Don McKay	
1988	Curler	Bruce Roberts	
1989	Builder	Art Cobb	
1989	Builder	Harvey Marshall	
1989	Curler	Bill Strum	
1990	Curler	Mike Slyziuk	
1990	Curler	Bob Nichols	
1991	Builder	J. Nelson Brown	
1991	Builder	Norman Rickards	
1991	Builder	Mary Van Ess	
1992	Curler	Orvil Gilleshammer	
1993	Builder	Ann Brown	
1994	Curlers (Team)	The 1965 world champions	Bud Somerville, Bill Strum, Al Gagne, Tom Wright
1994	Curlers (Team)	The 1976 world champions	Bruce Roberts, Joe Roberts, Gary Kleffman, Jerry Scott
1994	Curler	Tom Locken	
1994	Builder	Dr. Donald Barcome	
1995	Curler	Bob Christman	
1995	Builder	Jim Stephens	
1996	Builder	Bernie Roth	
1996	Curler	Ernest Slyziuk	
1996	Curler/Builder	Ken Sherwood	
1997	Curler	Harold Lauber	
1998	Builder	Frank Befera	
1998	Curler	Steve Brown	
1999	Builder	Tom Satrom	
2000	Curler	Glenn Gilleshammer	
2001	Curler	George Godfrey	
2001	Curler	Nancy Richard	
2002	Builder	John Williamson	
2002	Builder	Robert Hardy	
2003	Curler/Builder	Elgie Noble	
2005	Curler	Scott Baird	
2006	Curler	Lisa Schoeneberg	
2007	Curler	Mark Haluptzok	
2009	Builder	Kaytaro Sugahara	
2009	Curler	Paul Pustovar	
2010	Builder	Bob Fenson	
2012	Builder	Jon Mielke	
2013	Builder	Jerome Larson	
2016	Curler	Lori Mountford	
2017	Curlers (Team)	The 1974 world champions	Bud Somerville, Bob Nichols, Bill Strum, Tom Locken
2017	Curlers (Team)	The 1978 world champions	Bob Nichols, Bill Strum, Tom Locken, Bob Christman
2018	Builder	Andy Anderson	
2018	Builder	David Garber	
2018	Builder	Russ Lemcke	
2021	Contributor	Elmer Freytag	
2024	Contributor	Rich Lepping	
2024	Builder	Dave Staveteig	
2024	Curlers (Team)	The 2003 world women's champions	Debbie McCormick, Allison Pottinger, Ann Swisshelm Silver, Tracy Sachtjen
