= Kleffman =

Kleffman is a surname. Notable people with the surname include:

- Ervin Kleffman (1892–1987), American composer
- Fran Kleffman (fl. 1959–1962), American curler
- Gary Kleffman (fl. 1973–1984), American curler
- Terry Kleffman (fl. 1959–1962), American curler, son of Fran
