= Tom Locken =

American curler (born 1942)

- Curler ♂
- Born: October 16, 1942 (age 84); Duluth, Minnesota, U.S.

Team
- Curling club: Superior CC, Superior, Wisconsin

Curling career
- Member Association: United States
- World Championship: 2 (1974, 1978)
- Olympic: 1 (1988; demo)
Medal record
Curling
World Championships
Gold medal – first place	1974 Bern
Gold medal – first place	1978 Winnipeg
United States Men's Championship
Gold medal – first place	1974 Schenectady
Gold medal – first place	1978 Utica
United States Olympic Trials
Gold medal – first place	1987 St. Paul

Thomas Gilbert Locken (born October 16, 1942, in Duluth, Minnesota) is an American curler.

He is a two-time World Men's champion (1974, 1978) and a two-time United States men's curling champion (1974, 1978).

He played at the 1988 Winter Olympics when curling was a demonstration sport, USA men's team finished on fourth place.

== Awards ==
- United States Curling Association Hall of Fame:
  - 1994 (as curler);
  - 2017 (with all 1974 world champions team: skip Bud Somerville, third Bob Nichols and second Bill Strum).
  - 2017 (with all 1978 world champions team: skip Bob Nichols, third Bill Strum and lead Bob Christman).

== Teams ==
Season	Skip	Third	Second	Lead	Alternate	Events
1973–74	Bud Somerville	Bob Nichols	Bill Strum	Tom Locken		1974 USMCC (gold); 1974 WMCC (gold)
1974–75	Bud Somerville	Bob Nichols	Bill Strum	Tom Locken		
1975–76	Bud Somerville	Bob Nichols	Bill Strum	Tom Locken		
1976–77	Bud Somerville	Bob Nichols	Bill Strum	Tom Locken		
1977–78	Bob Nichols	Bill Strum	Tom Locken	Bob Christman		1978 USMCC (gold); 1978 WMCC (gold)
1987–88	Bob Nichols (fourth)	Bud Somerville (skip)	Tom Locken	Bob Christman	Bill Strum (WOG)	1987 USOCT (gold); 1988 WOG (4th)
1989–90	Jim Bradshaw	Tom Locken	Bob Christman	Bob Buchanan		
