= Bill Strum =

American curler

- Curler ♂
- Born: April 16, 1938; Bemidji, Minnesota, U.S.
- Died: August 28, 2010 (aged 72)

Team
- Curling club: Superior CC, Superior, Wisconsin

Curling career
- Member Association: United States
- World Championship: 5 (1965, 1968, 1969, 1974, 1978)
- Olympic: 2 (1988, 1992; demo)
Medal record
Curling
Winter Olympics
Bronze medal – third place	1992 Albertville (demo)
World Championships
Gold medal – first place	1965 Perth
Gold medal – first place	1974 Bern
Gold medal – first place	1978 Winnipeg
Silver medal – second place	1969 Perth
Bronze medal – third place	1968 Pointe-Claire
United States Men's Championship
Gold medal – first place	1965 Seattle
Gold medal – first place	1968 Madison
Gold medal – first place	1969 Grand Forks
Gold medal – first place	1974 Schenectady
Gold medal – first place	1978 Utica
United States Olympic Trials
Gold medal – first place	1991 Hibbing

William Strum (born April 16, 1938 – August 28, 2010) was an American curler from Superior, Wisconsin.

Strum was a three-time World Men's champion (1965, 1974, 1978) and a five-time United States men's curling champion (1965, 1968, 1969, 1974, 1978).

He played in the 1988 Winter Olympics and at the 1992 Winter Olympics when curling was a demonstration sport. In 1988, the USA men's team finished in fourth place, in 1992 they won bronze medal.

== Personal life ==
Strum attended Superior Central High School. He was a member of the Wisconsin National Guard and was a partner with Central Sheet Metal. He was also a member of Pilgrim Lutheran Church. He was married to Betty and had three children.

== Awards ==
- United States Curling Association Hall of Fame:
  - 1989 (as curler);
  - 1994 (with all 1965 world champions team: skip Bud Somerville, second Al Gagne and lead Tom Wright).
  - 2017 (with all 1974 world champions team: skip Bud Somerville, third Bob Nichols and lead Tom Locken).
  - 2017 (with all 1978 world champions team: skip Bob Nichols, second Tom Locken and lead Bob Christman).

== Teams ==
Season	Skip	Third	Second	Lead	Alternate	Events
1962–63	Bud Somerville	Jack Horst	Ray Somerville	Bill Strum		
1964–65	Bud Somerville	Bill Strum	Al Gagne	Tom Wright		USMCC 1965 (gold); WCC 1965 (gold)
1965–66	Bud Somerville	Bill Strum	Al Gagne	Tom Wright		
1967–68	Bud Somerville	Bill Strum	Al Gagne	Tom Wright		USMCC 1968 (gold); WCC 1968 (bronze)
1968–69	Bud Somerville	Bill Strum	Franklin Bradshaw	Gene Ovesen		USMCC 1969 (gold); WCC 1969 (silver)
1973–74	Bud Somerville	Bob Nichols	Bill Strum	Tom Locken		USMCC 1974 (gold); WCC 1974 (gold)
1974–75	Bud Somerville	Bob Nichols	Bill Strum	Tom Locken		
1975–76	Bud Somerville	Bob Nichols	Bill Strum	Tom Locken		
1976–77	Bud Somerville	Bob Nichols	Bill Strum	Tom Locken		
1977–78	Bob Nichols	Bill Strum	Tom Locken	Bob Christman		USMCC 1978 (gold); WCC 1978 (gold)
1987–88	Bob Nichols (fourth)	Bud Somerville (skip)	Tom Locken	Bob Christman	Bill Strum (WOG)	WOG 1988 (4th)
1991–92	Tim Somerville (fourth)	Mike Strum	Bud Somerville (skip)	Bill Strum	Bob Nichols (WOG)	USOCT 1991 (gold); WOG 1992 (bronze)
