= Bob Nichols (curler) =

American curler

- Curler ♂
- Born: January 27, 1948 (age 78); Superior, Wisconsin, U.S.

Team
- Curling club: Superior CC, Superior, Wisconsin

Curling career
- Member Association: United States
- World Championship: 3 (1974, 1978, 1981)
- Olympic: 2 (1988, 1992; demo)
Medal record
Curling
Winter Olympics
Bronze medal – third place	1992 Albertville (Demonstration)
World Championships
Gold medal – first place	1974 Bern
Gold medal – first place	1978 Winnipeg
Silver medal – second place	1981 London
United States Men's Championship
Gold medal – first place	1974 Schenectady
Gold medal – first place	1978 Utica
Gold medal – first place	1981 Fairbanks
United States Olympic Trials
Gold medal – first place	1987 St. Paul

Robert Nichols (born January 27, 1948, in Superior, Wisconsin) is an American curler.

He is a 1974, 1978 World Men's champion, 1981 silver medallist and a three-times United States men's curling champion (1974, 1978, 1981).

He played at the 1988 Winter Olympics when curling was a demonstration sport, USA men's team finished on fourth place. He played also at the 1992 Winter Olympics when curling was a demonstration sport, USA men's team won bronze medal.

== Awards ==
- United States Curling Association Hall of Fame:
  - 1990 (as curler);
  - 2017 (with all 1974 world champions team: skip Bud Somerville, second Bill Strum and lead Tom Locken);
  - 2017 (with all 1978 world champions team: third Bill Strum, second Tom Locken and lead Bob Christman).

== Teams ==
Season	Skip	Third	Second	Lead	Alternate	Coach	Events
1973–74	Bud Somerville	Bob Nichols	Bill Strum	Tom Locken			1974 USMCC (gold); 1974 WMCC (gold)
1974–75	Bud Somerville	Bob Nichols	Bill Strum	Tom Locken			
1975–76	Bud Somerville	Bob Nichols	Bill Strum	Tom Locken			
1976–77	Bud Somerville	Bob Nichols	Bill Strum	Tom Locken			
1977–78	Bob Nichols	Bill Strum	Tom Locken	Bob Christman			1978 USMCC (gold); 1978 WMCC (gold)
1980–81	Bob Nichols (fourth)	Bud Somerville (skip)	Bob Christman	Bob Buchanan			1981 USMCC (gold); 1981 WMCC (silver)
1982–83	Bob Nichols (fourth)	Bud Somerville (skip)	Tim Somerville	Bob Christman			
1983–84	Bob Nichols (fourth)	Bud Somerville (skip)	Tim Somerville	Bob Christman			
1987–88	Bob Nichols (fourth)	Bud Somerville (skip)	Tom Locken	Bob Christman	Bill Strum (WOG)		1987 USOCT (gold); 1988 WOG (4th)
1991–92	Tim Somerville (fourth)	Mike Strum	Bud Somerville (skip)	Bill Strum	Bob Nichols (WOG)	Bob Buchanan	1992 WOG (bronze)
