= Tom Wright (curler) =

American male curler

- Curler ♂

Team
- Curling club: Superior CC, Superior, Wisconsin

Curling career
- Member Association: United States
- World Championship: 2 (1965, 1968)
Medal record
Curling
World Championships
Gold medal – first place	1965 Perth
Bronze medal – third place	1968 Pointe-Claire
United States Men's Championship
Gold medal – first place	1965 Seattle
Gold medal – first place	1968 Madison

Tom Wright is an American curler.

He is a World Men's champion (1968), bronze medallist (1965) and a two-time United States men's champion (1965, 1968).

== Awards ==
- United States Curling Association Hall of Fame: 1994 (with all 1965 world champions team: skip Bud Somerville, third Bill Strum and second Al Gagne).

== Teams ==
Season	Skip	Third	Second	Lead	Events
1964–65	Bud Somerville	Bill Strum	Al Gagne	Tom Wright	USMCC 1965 (gold); WCC 1965 (gold)
1967–68	Bud Somerville	Bill Strum	Al Gagne	Tom Wright	USMCC 1968 (gold); WCC 1968 (bronze)
