= Mike Strum =

American curler

- Curler
- Born: Michael Strum; July 15, 1963 (age 63)

Team
- Curling club: Superior CC, Superior, Wisconsin

Curling career
- Member Association: United States
- Olympic: 1 (1992 (demo))
Medal record
Men's curling
Representing United States
Olympic Games
Bronze medal – third place	1992 Albertville (demonstration)
United States Olympic Trials
Gold medal – first place	1991 Hibbing

Michael Strum (born July 15, 1963) is an American curler.

In 1992 Strum played lead on his uncle Bud Somerville's team when they won the bronze medal at the 1992 Winter Olympics, where curling was a demonstration event. Also on the team was Strum's father Bill Strum and cousin Tim Somerville.

== Personal life ==
Strum comes from a curling family, his father Bill was a three-time World Champion and two-time Olympian and his mother Betty Ann curled for 25 years.

== Teams ==
Season	Skip	Third	Second	Lead	Alternate	Coach	Events
1990–91	Tim Somerville (fourth)	Mike Strum	Bud Somerville (skip)	Bill Strum			1991 USOCT (gold)
1991–92	Tim Somerville (fourth)	Mike Strum	Bud Somerville (skip)	Bill Strum	Bob Nichols	Bob Buchanan	1992 OG (bronze)
1992–93	Tim Somerville	Mike Strum	Mike Schneeberger	John Gordon			1993 USMCC (4th)
