= Bob Buchanan (curler) =

American curler

Robert Buchanan
- Curler

Team
- Curling club: Superior CC, Superior, Wisconsin

Curling career
- Member Association: United States
- World Championship: 1 (1981)
Medal record
Curling
World Championships
| Silver medal – second place | 1981 London |
United States Men's Championship
| Gold medal – first place | 1981 Fairbanks |

Robert Buchanan is an American curler from Superior, Wisconsin.

In 1981 Buchanan played lead on Bud Somerville's team as they won the United States Men's Championship and continued to win the silver medal at the World Men's Championship. He joined Somerville again a decade later, this time as coach for Somerville's bronze medal winning 1992 Olympic team.

== Teams ==
| Season | Skip | Third | Second | Lead | Alternate | Coach | Events |
|---|---|---|---|---|---|---|---|
| 1978–79 | Bud Somerville | Bill Venne | Dick Campbell | Bob Buchanan | | | |
| 1980–81 | Bob Nichols (fourth) | Bud Somerville (skip) | Bob Christman | Bob Buchanan | | | 1981 USMCC (gold); 1981 WCC (silver) |
| 1989–90 | Jim Bradshaw | Tom Locken | Bob Christman | Bob Buchanan | | | |
| 1991–92 | Tim Somerville (fourth) | Mike Strum | Bud Somerville (skip) | Bill Strum | Bob Nichols | Bob Buchanan | 1992 OG (bronze) |
