= United States Men's Curling Championship =

Annual curling competition in the United States of America

- Established: 1957
- 2026 host city: Charlotte, North Carolina
- 2026 arena: Bojangles Coliseum
- 2026 champion: (Minnesota) John Shuster

Current edition
- 2026 United States Men's Curling Championship

The United States Men's Curling Championship is the annual men's national curling championship for the United States. It is run by the United States Curling Association (USCA) and typically held in conjunction with the Women's Championship. The champion is eligible to represent the United States at the World Men's Curling Championships if they also rank in the top 75 teams over the last two seasons in the World Curling Tour Order of Merit or have earned 40 points in the Order of Merit year-to-date rankings.

== History ==
The United States Men's Curling Championship was started when Marshall Field and Company was inspired to host an American equivalent to the popular Macdonald Brier in Canada. The first championship was held from March 27 to 30, 1957 at the Chicago Stadium in Chicago, Illinois. The opening night of the championship included a performance by the Scotch Highlander band of University of Iowa, an all female bagpipe and drum band, and were televised by the local television channel WGN-TV. Ken Watson, three-time Canadian champion, was hired as the commissioner of play and tasked with overseeing the umpires. Ten teams from nine states and one territory (Alaska) competed in a round-robin tournament with Harold Lauber's team from Hibbing, Minnesota coming out victorious.

Marshall Field and Company again ran the Championship in 1958, held at the Milwaukee Arena in Milwaukee, Wisconsin. In 1959 the newly formed United States Curling Association took over the operations of the Championship while Marshall Field and Company continued on as a sponsor. That year's Championship was held in Green Bay, Wisconsin at the Brown County Memorial Arena.

In 1961 Frank Crealock and his team out of Seattle won the fifth National Men's Championship, earning them the opportunity to represent the United States at the 1961 Scotch Cup in Scotland. While it was the third year that the Scotch Cup, which would later become the World Men's Curling Championship, was held it was the first year that the United States was invited to compete. Crealock competed against the national champions from Canada and Scotland and after a double round-robin all three teams were tied with a 2–2 record. A playoff was held to break the tie and the United States lost to Canada to finish third. For many years after this, the national champion would go on to represent the United States at the World Championships, though eligibility prerequisites were added in recent years.

The 2021 Championship was originally planned to be held February 6–13 at the ImOn Ice Arena in Cedar Rapids, Iowa, and it would have been the first time the Men's National Championship was held in Iowa. But in August 2020 the arena was damaged during a severe derecho storm. The ongoing COVID-19 pandemic caused delays in repairing the arena, and in November 2020 the USCA announced that an alternative host site would be found. Only a month later, the USCA announced another change to the 2021 Championship when they declared that all remaining 2020–21 events would be either cancelled or postponed until late spring 2021. This postponement delayed the Men's National Championship until after the 2021 World Men's Championship and so the 2020 champions, John Shuster's team, were selected to represent the United States. This allowed the team to compete at Worlds which they missed the previous year when the 2020 World Men's Championship was cancelled due to the COVID-19 pandemic. On March 29, 2021 it was announced that the 2021 Men's Championship will be held in conjunction with the Women's Nationals and Mixed Doubles Nationals in a bio-secure bubble at Wausau Curling Club in Wausau, Wisconsin in May, 2021.

== Qualification ==
The qualification methods and format of the championship has changed over time, but currently ten teams play in each championship. Five spots are awarded to the top American teams in the World Curling Federation (WCF) World Team Ranking System at a particular date roughly two months out from the championship. Four spots are awarded to the top teams from a Challenge Round, open to all United States curlers. The final spot is awarded to a team from that year's Junior Championships, as selected by the USCA.

Previously the USCA's High Performance Program has had the ability to select two of the competitors from their pool of teams.

For the 2021 Championship the qualification methods were modified slightly due to impacts of the COVID-19 pandemic. The field was cut down to eight teams, included were the 2020 champion and runner-up, the top three teams in the WCF World Team Ranking System on September 1, 2020, and the top three teams from the Challenge Round. The tournament was later postponed to May 2021; as it falls after the 2021 World Men's Curling Championship, the 2020 winners will represent the United States in their place.

== Format ==
The current format begins with a complete nine game round robin where each of the ten teams play every other team. At the end of the round robin the top four teams qualify for the playoffs; if there is a tie for fourth place then a tiebreaker game is played. The playoffs are conducted in the page playoff format, a common playoff format in curling. In a page playoff the 1 seed and 2 seed play with the winner advancing straight to the championship game. The 3 seed and 4 seed teams play and the winner of that match plays the loser of the 1 vs 2 game. The winner of this third game advances to the championship to face the winner of the 1 vs 2 game.

== Past champions ==
The location and champion of every men's national championship since it began in 1957:

Year	Site	Winning club	Skip	Third	Second	Lead	Finish at Worlds^{1}
1957	Chicago, IL	(Minnesota) Hibbing, MN	Harold Lauber	Louis Lauber	Peter Beasy	Matt Berklich	
1958	Milwaukee, WI	(Michigan) Detroit, MI	Mike Slyziuk	Douglas Fisk	Ernest Slyziuk	Merritt Knowlson	
1959	Green Bay, WI	(Minnesota) Hibbing, MN	Dick Brown	Terry Kleffman	Fran Kleffman	Nick Jerulle	
1960	Chicago, IL	(North Dakota) Grafton, ND	Orvil Gilleshammer	Glenn Gilleshammer	Wilmer Collette	Donald LaBonte	
1961	Grand Forks, ND	(Washington (state)) Seattle, WA	Frank Crealock	Ken Sherwood	John Jamieson	Bud McCartney	Bronze
1962	Detroit, MI	(Minnesota) Hibbing, MN	Dick Brown	Terry Kleffman	Fran Kleffman	Nick Jerulle	Silver
1963	Duluth, MN	(Michigan) Detroit, MI	Mike Slyziuk	Nelson Brown	Ernest Slyziuk	Walter Hubchick	Silver
1964	Utica, NY	(Minnesota) Duluth, MN	Robert Magie Jr.	Bert Payne	Russell Barber	Britton Payne	Bronze
1965	Seattle, WA	(Wisconsin) Superior, WI	Bud Somerville	Bill Strum	Al Gagne	Tom Wright	Gold
1966	Hibbing, MN	(North Dakota) Fargo, ND	Bruce Roberts	Joe Zbacnik	Gerry Toutant	Mike O’Leary	Bronze
1967	Winchester, MA	(Washington (state)) Seattle, WA	Bruce Roberts	Tom Fitzpatrick	John Wright	Doug Walker	Bronze
1968	Madison, WI	(Wisconsin) Superior, WI	Bud Somerville	Bill Strum	Al Gagne	Tom Wright	Bronze
1969	Grand Forks, ND	(Wisconsin) Superior, WI	Bud Somerville	Bill Strum	Franklin Bradshaw	Gene Ovesen	Silver
1970	Ardsley, NY	(North Dakota) Grafton, ND	Art Tallackson	Glenn Gilleshammer	Ray Holt	Trueman Thompson	4th
1971	Duluth, MN	(North Dakota) Edmore, ND	Dale Dalziel	Dennis Melland	Clark Sampson	Rodney Melland	Bronze
1972	Wilmette, IL	(North Dakota) Grafton, ND	Robert LaBonte	Frank Aasand	John Aasand	Ray Morgan	Silver
1973	Colorado Springs, CO	(Massachusetts) Winchester, MA	Charles Reeves	Doug Carlson	Henry Shean	Barry Blanchard	5th
1974	Schenectady, N.Y.	(Wisconsin) Superior, WI	Bud Somerville	Bob Nichols	Bill Strum	Tom Locken	Gold
1975	Detroit, MI	(Washington (state)) Seattle, WA	Ed Risling	Charles Lundgren	Gary Schnee	Dave Tellvik	Silver
1976	Wausau WI	(Minnesota) Hibbing, MN	Bruce Roberts	Joe Roberts	Gary Kleffman	Jerry Scott	Gold
1977	Northbrook, IL	(Minnesota) Hibbing, MN	Bruce Roberts	Paul Pustovar	Gary Kleffman	Jerry Scott	4th
1978	Utica, NY	(Wisconsin) Superior, WI	Bob Nichols	Bill Strum	Tom Locken	Bob Christman	Gold
1979	Superior, WI	(Minnesota) Bemidji, MN	Scott Baird	Dan Haluptzok	Mark Haluptzok	Bob Fenson	5th
1980	Bemidji, MN	(Minnesota) Hibbing, MN	Paul Pustovar	John Jankila	Gary Kleffman	Jerry Scott	4th
1981	Fairbanks, AK	(Wisconsin) Superior, WI	Bob Nichols	Bud Somerville	Bob Christman	Bob Buchanan	Silver
1982	Brookline, MA	(Wisconsin) Madison, WI	Steve Brown	Ed Sheffield	Huns Gustrowsky	George Godfrey	6th
1983	Colorado Springs, CO	Colorado Springs, CO	Don Cooper	Jerry Van Brunt Jr.	Bill Shipstad	Jack McNelly	6th
1984	Hibbing MN	(Minnesota) Hibbing, MN	Joe Roberts (4th)	Bruce Roberts (skip)	Gary Kleffman	Jerry Scott	6th
1985	Mequon, WI	(Illinois) Wilmette, IL	Tim Wright	John Jahant	Jim Wilson	Russ Armstrong	3rd
1986	Seattle, WA	(Wisconsin) Madison, WI	Steve Brown	Wally Henry	George Godfrey	Richard Maskel	Bronze
1987	Lake Placid, NY	(Washington (state)) Seattle, WA	Jim Vukich	Ron Sharpe	George Pepelnjak	Gary Joraanstad	5th
1988	St. Paul, MN	(Washington (state)) Seattle, WA	Doug Jones	Bard Nordlund	Murphy Tomlinson	Mike Grennan	7th
1989	Detroit, MI	(Washington (state)) Seattle, WA	Jim Vukich	Curt Fish	Bard Nordlund	James Pleasants, alt.: Jason Larway	8th
1990	Superior, WI	(Washington (state)) Seattle, WA	Bard Nordlund	Doug Jones	Murphy Tomlinson	Tom Violette	6th
1991	Utica, NY	(Wisconsin) Madison, WI	Steve Brown	Paul Pustovar	George Godfrey	Wally Henry, Mike Fraboni	Bronze
1992	Grafton, ND	(Washington (state)) Seattle, WA	Doug Jones	Jason Larway	Joel Larway	Tom Violette	Bronze
1993	St. Paul, MN	(Minnesota) Bemidji, MN	Scott Baird	Pete Fenson	Mark Haluptzok	Tim Johnson	Bronze
1994	Duluth, MN	(Minnesota) Bemidji, MN	Scott Baird	Pete Fenson	Mark Haluptzok	Tim Johnson	5th
1995	Appleton, WI	(Wisconsin) Superior, WI	Tim Somerville	Mike Schneeberger	Myles Brundidge	John Gordon	4th
1996	Bemidji, MN	(Wisconsin) Superior, WI	Tim Somerville	Mike Schneeberger	Myles Brundidge	John Gordon	5th
1997	Seattle, WA	(North Dakota) Langdon, ND	Craig Disher	Kevin Kakela	Joel Jacobson	Paul Peterson	6th
1998	Bismarck, ND	(Wisconsin) Stevens Point, WI	Paul Pustovar	Dave Violette	Greg Wilson	Cory Ward	6th
1999	Duluth, MN	(Wisconsin) Superior, WI	Tim Somerville	Don Barcome Jr.	Myles Brundidge	John Gordon	4th
2000	Ogden, UT	(Wisconsin) Madison, WI	Craig Brown	Ryan Quinn	Jon Brunt	John Dunlop	4th
2001	Madison, WI	(Washington (state)) Seattle, WA	Jason Larway	Greg Romaniuk	Joel Larway	Travis Way, Doug Kauffman	6th
2002	Eveleth, MN	(Wisconsin) Madison, WI	Paul Pustovar	Mike Fraboni	Geoff Goodland	Richard Maskel	4th
2003	Utica, NY	(Minnesota) Bemidji, MN	Pete Fenson	Eric Fenson	Shawn Rojeski	John Shuster	8th
2004	Grand Forks, ND	(Washington (state)) Seattle, WA	Jason Larway	Doug Pottinger	Joel Larway	Bill Todhunter, Doug Kauffman	9th
2005	Madison, WI	(Minnesota) Bemidji, MN	Pete Fenson	Shawn Rojeski	Joe Polo	John Shuster	6th
2006	Bemidji, MN	(Minnesota) Bemidji, MN	Pete Fenson	Shawn Rojeski	Joe Polo	John Shuster	4th
2007	Utica, NY	(Minnesota) Caledonian	Todd Birr	Bill Todhunter	Greg Johnson	Kevin Birr	Bronze
2008	Hibbing, MN	(Wisconsin) Madison, WI	Craig Brown	Rich Ruohonen	John Dunlop	Pete Annis	7th
2009	Broomfield, CO	(Minnesota) Duluth, MN	John Shuster	Jason Smith	Jeff Isaacson	John Benton	5th
2010	Kalamazoo, MI	(Minnesota) Bemidji, MN	Pete Fenson	Shawn Rojeski	Joe Polo	Tyler George	4th
2011	Fargo, ND	(Minnesota) Bemidji, MN	Pete Fenson	Shawn Rojeski	Joe Polo	Ryan Brunt	10th
2012	Philadelphia, PA	(New York (state)) Ardsley, NY	Heath McCormick	Bill Stopera	Martin Sather	Dean Gemmell	8th
2013	Green Bay, WI	(Washington (state)) Seattle, WA	Brady Clark	Sean Beighton	Darren Lehto	Philip Tilker, Steve Lundeen	9th
2014	Philadelphia, PA	(Minnesota) Bemidji, MN	Pete Fenson	Shawn Rojeski	Joe Polo	Ryan Brunt	10th
2015	Kalamazoo, MI	(Minnesota) Duluth, MN	John Shuster	Tyler George	Matt Hamilton	John Landsteiner	5th
2016	Jacksonville, FL	(Washington (state)) Seattle, WA	Brady Clark	Greg Persinger	Colin Hufman	Philip Tilker	Bronze (Shuster^{1})
2017	Everett, WA	(Minnesota) Duluth, MN	John Shuster	Tyler George	Matt Hamilton	John Landsteiner	4th
2018	Fargo, ND	(Washington (state)) Seattle, WA	Greg Persinger	Rich Ruohonen	Colin Hufman	Philip Tilker	6th
2019	Kalamazoo, MI	(Minnesota) Duluth, MN	John Shuster	Chris Plys	Matt Hamilton	John Landsteiner	5th
2020	Cheney, WA	(Minnesota) Duluth, MN	John Shuster	Chris Plys	Matt Hamilton	John Landsteiner	T5th^{2}
2021	Wausau, WI	(Minnesota) Chaska, MN	Korey Dropkin	Mark Fenner	Thomas Howell	Alex Fenson	4th ^{3}
2023	Denver, CO	(Minnesota) Duluth, MN	John Shuster	Chris Plys	Matt Hamilton	John Landsteiner	8th
2024	East Rutherford, NJ	(Minnesota) Duluth, MN	John Shuster	Chris Plys	Colin Hufman	Matt Hamilton	6th
2025	Duluth, MN	(Minnesota) Duluth, MN	Korey Dropkin	Thomas Howell	Andrew Stopera	Mark Fenner	11th
2026	Charlotte, NC	(Minnesota) Duluth, MN	John Shuster	Chris Plys	Colin Hufman	Matt Hamilton	4th

Notes

1. This column shows the results of the team representing the United States at the World Curling Championships. Based on the rules implemented by the United States Curling Association for the 2013–14 season, the United States team at the World Curling Championships is not necessarily the team that won the national championship.
2. Record is for the 2021 World Men's Curling Championship. The 2020 World Men's Curling Championship was cancelled due to the COVID-19 pandemic.
3. Record is for the 2022 World Men's Curling Championship. The 2022 US Championship was cancelled due to the COVID-19 pandemic.

== Champions by state ==
As of 2026

Men's Curling Champions
13, 10, 9, 8, 7, 6, 5, 3, 2, 1

Rank	State	Trophies
1	Minnesota	28
2	Wisconsin	16
3	(Washington (state)) Washington	13
4	North Dakota	6
5	Michigan	2
6	Colorado	1
6	Illinois	1
6	Massachusetts	1
6	(New York (state)) New York	1

== Sportsmanship Award ==
The Ann Brown Sportsmanship Award has been presented annually since 2007 to one male and one female athlete at the National Championships who are judged to best embody the USCA Spirit of Curling as voted on by their peers. The award is given in memory of Ann Brown, who was the first female president of the United States Curling Association and was the second female inductee into the USCA Hall of Fame.

Male recipients:
Year	Recipient
2007	Joel Jacobson
2008	Greg Romaniuk
2009	Mike Farbelow
2010	Kevin Kakela
2011	Todd Birr
2012	Kroy Nernberger
2013	Mike Farbelow
2014	Josh Bahr
2015	Mark Haluptzok
2016	Jason Smith
2017	Hunter Clawson
2018	Tucker Smith
2019	Sam Strouse
2020	Jason Smith
2021	Jason Smith
2024	Nate Parry

== See also ==
- Scottish Men's Curling Championship
- Tim Hortons Brier
- United States Women's Curling Championship
- Scotties Tournament of Hearts (Canada)
- Scottish Women's Curling Championship
