= Al Gagne =

American curler (1941–2020)

- Curler ♂
- Born: 10 November 1941; Duluth, Minnesota, U.S.
- Died: 11 July 2020 (aged 78); Duluth, Minnesota, U.S.

Team
- Curling club: Superior CC, Superior, Wisconsin

Curling career
- Member Association: United States
- World Championship: 2 (1965, 1968)
Medal record
Curling
World Championships
| Gold medal – first place | 1965 Perth |
| Bronze medal – third place | 1968 Pointe-Claire |
United States Men's Championship
| Gold medal – first place | 1965 Seattle |
| Gold medal – first place | 1968 Madison |

Alfred Ignatius Gagne (10 November 1941 – 11 July 2020), born and died in Duluth, Minnesota, was an American curler.

He was a World Men's champion (1965), bronze medallist (1968) and a two-time United States men's champion (1965, 1968).

== Awards ==
- United States Curling Association Hall of Fame: 1994 (with all 1965 world champions team: skip Bud Somerville, third Bill Strum and lead Tom Wright).

== Teams ==
| Season | Skip | Third | Second | Lead | Events |
|---|---|---|---|---|---|
| 1964–65 | Bud Somerville | Bill Strum | Al Gagne | Tom Wright | USMCC 1965 (gold); WCC 1965 (gold) |
| 1967–68 | Bud Somerville | Bill Strum | Al Gagne | Tom Wright | USMCC 1968 (gold); WCC 1968 (bronze) |
