= Bob Christman =

American curler

- Curler ♂
- Born: December 7, 1942 (age 83); Ottawa, Illinois, U.S.

Team
- Curling club: Superior CC, Superior, Wisconsin

Curling career
- Member Association: United States
- World Championship: 2 (1978, 1981)
- Olympic: 1 (1988; demo)
Medal record
Curling
World Championships
Gold medal – first place	1978 Winnipeg
Silver medal – second place	1981 London
United States Men's Championship
Gold medal – first place	1978 Utica
Gold medal – first place	1981 Fairbanks
United States Olympic Trials
Gold medal – first place	1987 St. Paul

Robert Christman (born December 7, 1942, in Ottawa, Illinois) is an American curler.

He is a 1978 World Men's champion, 1981 silver medallist and a two-times United States men's curling champion (1978, 1981).

He played at the 1988 Winter Olympics when curling was a demonstration sport, USA men's team finished on fourth place.

== Awards ==
- United States Curling Association Hall of Fame:
  - 1995 (as curler);
  - 2017 (with all 1978 world champions team: skip Bob Nichols, third Bill Strum and second Tom Locken).

== Teams ==
Season	Skip	Third	Second	Lead	Alternate	Events
1977–78	Bob Nichols	Bill Strum	Tom Locken	Bob Christman		1978 USMCC (gold); 1978 WMCC (gold)
1980–81	Bob Nichols (fourth)	Bud Somerville (skip)	Bob Christman	Bob Buchanan		1981 USMCC (gold); 1981 WMCC (silver)
1982–83	Bob Nichols (fourth)	Bud Somerville (skip)	Tim Somerville	Bob Christman		
1983–84	Bob Nichols (fourth)	Bud Somerville (skip)	Tim Somerville	Bob Christman		
1987–88	Bob Nichols (fourth)	Bud Somerville (skip)	Tom Locken	Bob Christman	Bill Strum (WOG)	1987 USOCT (gold); 1988 WOG (4th)
1989–90	Jim Bradshaw	Tom Locken	Bob Christman	Bob Buchanan		
