= Ron Schindle =

Canadian male curler

- Curler ♂

Team
- Curling club: Medicine Hat CC, Medicine Hat, AB

Curling career
- Member Association: Alberta
- Brier: 1: (1978)
- World Championship: 1 (1978)
Medal record
Curling
Representing Canada
World Championships
Bronze medal – third place	1978 Winnipeg
Macdonald Brier
Representing Alberta
Gold medal – first place	1978 Vancouver

Ronald E. Schindle is a Canadian curler.

He is a 1978 World Men's bronze medallist and a 1978 Brier champion.

== Teams ==
Season	Skip	Third	Second	Lead	Events
1977–78	Ed Lukowich (fourth)	Mike Chernoff (skip)	Dale Johnston	Ron Schindle	Brier 1978 (gold); WCC 1978 (bronze)
