= Dale Johnston (curler) =

Canadian male curler

- Curler

Team
- Curling club: Medicine Hat CC, Medicine Hat, AB

Curling career
- Member Association: Alberta
- Brier: 1 (1978)
- World Championship: 1 (1978)
Medal record
Curling
Representing Canada
World Championships
| Bronze medal – third place | 1978 Winnipeg |
Macdonald Brier
Representing Alberta
| Gold medal – first place | 1978 Vancouver |

Dale R. Johnston is a Canadian curler.

He is a 1978 World Men's bronze medallist and a 1978 Brier champion.

== Teams ==
| Season | Skip | Third | Second | Lead | Events |
|---|---|---|---|---|---|
| 1977–78 | Ed Lukowich (fourth) | Mike Chernoff (skip) | Dale Johnston | Ron Schindle | Brier 1978 (gold); WCC 1978 (bronze) |
