= Börje Holmgren =

Swedish curler (1909–1990)

- Curler ♂
- Born: 23 August 1909; Stockholm
- Died: 1990 (aged 80–81)

Team
- Curling club: Örebro CK, Örebro

Curling career
- Member Association: Sweden
- World Championship: 1 (1965)
Medal record
Curling
World Championships
Bronze medal – third place	1965 Perth
Swedish Men's Championship
Gold medal – first place	1965

Börje Holmgren (23 August 1909, in Stockholm – 1990) was a Swedish curler.

He was a 1965 World Men's bronze medallist, a 1965 Swedish men's curling champion and a 1969 Swedish seniors champion curler.

== Teams ==
Season	Skip	Third	Second	Lead	Events
1964–65	Tore Rydman (fourth)	Gunnar Kullendorf (skip)	Sigurd Rydén	Börje Holmgren	SMCC 1965 (gold); WCC 1965 (bronze)
1968–69	Börje Holmgren	Bengt Thermaenieus	Sigge Ryden	Harry Wikström	SSCC 1969 (gold)
