= 1978 Macdonald Brier =

- Host city: Vancouver, British Columbia
- Arena: Pacific Coliseum
- Dates: March 5–10
- Attendance: 63,851
- Winner: Alberta
- Curling club: Medicine Hat CC, Medicine Hat
- Skip: Mike Chernoff
- Fourth: Ed Lukowich
- Second: Dale Johnston
- Lead: Ron Schindle

The 1978 Macdonald Brier, the Canadian men's curling championship was held March 5 to 10, 1978 at the Pacific Coliseum in Vancouver, British Columbia. The total attendance for the week was a then-record 63,851 breaking the previous mark set at the 1976 Brier in Regina.

Team Alberta, who was skipped by Mike Chernoff won the Brier tankard by finishing the round robin with a 9–2 record. This was Alberta's thirteenth Brier championship overall. Chernoff's rink would go onto represent Canada in the 1978 Air Canada Silver Broom, the men's world curling championship on home soil in Winnipeg, Manitoba where they lost in the semifinal to Norway.

Nova Scotia's 14–1 six end victory over Manitoba in Draw 6 tied a record set in 1929 for fewest ends played in a single game.

== Teams ==
The teams are listed as follows:

Alberta	British Columbia	Manitoba
Medicine Hat CC, Medicine Hat Fourth: Ed Lukowich; Skip: Mike Chernoff; Second: Dale Johnston; Lead: Ron Schindle	Vancouver CC, Vancouver Skip: Bernie Sparkes; Third: Ron Thompson; Second: Al Cook; Lead: Keiven Bauer	Heather CC, Winnipeg Skip: Doug Harrison; Third: Jim Sampson; Second: Rick Hoffman; Lead: Bryan Wood
New Brunswick	Newfoundland	Northern Ontario
Thistle-St. Andrew's CC, Saint John Skip: Pete Murray; Third: Ralph McLenaghan; Second: Dough Trecartin; Lead: Bill Oliver	Goose Bay CC, Happy Valley-Goose Bay Skip: Bob Rowe; Third: Tom Melnyk; Second: Tony Pilling; Lead: Charles Fennimore	Kapuskasing CC, Kapuskasing Skip: Barry Mutrie; Third: John Ballantyne; Second: John K. Ross; Lead: Edward Bowcock
Nova Scotia	Ontario	Prince Edward Island
Dartmouth CC, Dartmouth Skip: Alan Darragh; Third: Peter McPhee; Second: Mike Currie; Lead: Lowell Goulden	London CC, London Skip: Gerry Hodson; Third: Barry Paterson; Second: Glenn Webster; Lead: Ross Guest	Summerside CC, Summerside Skip: Peter McDonald; Third: Rod McDonald; Second: Ron Casey; Lead: Keith Wedge
Quebec	Saskatchewan	Northwest Territories/Yukon
Caledonia CC, Westmount Skip: Steve Ducat; Third: Karl Murovic; Second: Glenn Aldridge; Lead: Malcolm Turner	Nutana CC, Saskatoon Skip: Rick Folk; Third: Bob Thompson; Second: Tom Wilson; Lead: Rodger Schmidt	Fort Smith CC, Fort Smith Skip: Howie Brazeau; Third: Jim Schaefer; Second: Charles Schaefer; Lead: Malcolm MacEachern

== Map of teams ==
Provincial Winners

== Round Robin standings ==
Final Round Robin standings

Key
Brier champion

Province	Skip	W	L	PF	PA
Alberta	Mike Chernoff	9	2	79	63
Saskatchewan	Rick Folk	8	3	83	62
British Columbia	Bernie Sparkes	8	3	77	59
Nova Scotia	Alan Darragh	6	5	86	67
New Brunswick	Pete Murray	6	5	73	79
Newfoundland	Bob Rowe	5	6	69	74
Manitoba	Doug Harrison	5	6	65	84
Northwest Territories/Yukon	Howie Brazeau	5	6	68	60
Prince Edward Island	Peter McDonald	5	6	77	73
Ontario	Gerry Hodson	4	7	67	79
Northern Ontario	Barry Mutrie	3	8	58	91
Quebec	Steve Ducat	2	9	67	78

== Round Robin results ==
All draw times are listed in Pacific Standard Time (UTC-08:00).

=== Draw 1 ===
Sunday, March 5, 2:30 pm

Sheet A	1	2	3	4	5	6	7	8	9	10	Final
Manitoba (Harrison)	2	0	0	1	0	0	0	0	0	X	3
Alberta (Chernoff)	0	0	3	0	2	1	2	0	1	X	9

Sheet B	1	2	3	4	5	6	7	8	9	10	Final
Prince Edward Island (McDonald)	0	0	0	1	0	1	0	1	1	0	4
Saskatchewan (Folk)	1	0	1	0	1	0	2	0	0	1	6

Sheet C	1	2	3	4	5	6	7	8	9	10	Final
Northwest Territories/Yukon (Brazeau)	1	1	0	1	0	0	2	1	1	X	7
Quebec (Ducat)	0	0	1	0	0	1	0	0	0	X	2

Sheet D	1	2	3	4	5	6	7	8	9	10	Final
New Brunswick (Murray)	1	2	0	0	1	0	0	0	0	0	4
Nova Scotia (Darragh)	0	0	1	0	0	1	2	1	2	1	8

Sheet E	1	2	3	4	5	6	7	8	9	10	11	Final
British Columbia (Sparkes)	0	0	2	2	0	0	1	0	2	0	1	8
Newfoundland (Rowe)	0	1	0	0	2	1	0	1	0	2	0	7

Sheet F	1	2	3	4	5	6	7	8	9	10	Final
Northern Ontario (Mutrie)	3	0	0	0	2	0	2	2	0	X	9
Ontario (Hodson)	0	2	0	1	0	1	0	0	2	X	6

=== Draw 2 ===
Monday, March 6, 1:00 pm

Sheet A	1	2	3	4	5	6	7	8	9	10	Final
Ontario (Hodson)	2	0	0	0	2	0	2	0	3	X	9
New Brunswick (Murray)	0	0	0	1	0	1	0	1	0	X	3

Sheet B	1	2	3	4	5	6	7	8	9	10	Final
Nova Scotia (Darragh)	0	2	2	0	2	0	2	0	1	X	9
Newfoundland (Rowe)	1	0	0	1	0	1	0	2	0	X	5

Sheet C	1	2	3	4	5	6	7	8	9	10	Final
British Columbia (Sparkes)	1	1	0	0	0	0	0	1	0	0	3
Manitoba (Harrison)	0	0	0	0	1	0	0	0	2	3	6

Sheet D	1	2	3	4	5	6	7	8	9	10	Final
Northwest Territories/Yukon (Brazeau)	0	0	0	1	1	0	0	0	3	1	6
Saskatchewan (Folk)	0	2	1	0	0	0	0	1	0	0	4

Sheet E	1	2	3	4	5	6	7	8	9	10	Final
Northern Ontario (Mutrie)	0	0	0	0	0	1	0	0	X	X	1
Quebec (Ducat)	2	1	2	2	1	0	2	1	X	X	11

Sheet F	1	2	3	4	5	6	7	8	9	10	Final
Prince Edward Island (McDonald)	0	2	0	1	0	0	1	0	3	X	7
Alberta (Chernoff)	2	0	1	0	2	1	0	4	0	X	10

=== Draw 3 ===
Monday, March 6, 7:30 pm

Sheet A	1	2	3	4	5	6	7	8	9	10	Final
Prince Edward Island (McDonald)	0	0	0	2	0	1	0	0	2	X	5
British Columbia (Sparkes)	2	0	1	0	2	0	0	2	0	X	7

Sheet B	1	2	3	4	5	6	7	8	9	10	Final
Alberta (Chernoff)	0	1	0	0	2	2	0	0	0	1	6
Northwest Territories/Yukon (Brazeau)	1	0	0	1	0	0	1	1	1	0	5

Sheet C	1	2	3	4	5	6	7	8	9	10	Final
Northern Ontario (Mutrie)	1	0	0	2	0	0	1	0	0	X	4
Nova Scotia (Darragh)	0	2	3	0	1	3	0	1	3	X	13

Sheet D	1	2	3	4	5	6	7	8	9	10	Final
Newfoundland (Rowe)	0	0	0	0	1	0	1	0	0	X	2
Ontario (Hodson)	0	1	1	4	0	1	0	0	1	X	8

Sheet E	1	2	3	4	5	6	7	8	9	10	Final
Manitoba (Harrison)	1	0	1	0	0	2	1	1	1	2	9
Saskatchewan (Folk)	0	3	0	2	1	0	0	0	0	0	6

Sheet F	1	2	3	4	5	6	7	8	9	10	Final
Quebec (Ducat)	0	2	0	0	0	1	0	2	0	X	5
New Brunswick (Murray)	1	0	2	1	0	0	2	0	3	X	9

=== Draw 4 ===
Tuesday, March 7, 1:00 pm

Sheet A	1	2	3	4	5	6	7	8	9	10	Final
Northwest Territories/Yukon (Brazeau)	0	1	0	2	0	0	2	1	0	1	7
Nova Scotia (Darragh)	1	0	1	0	0	3	0	0	0	0	5

Sheet B	1	2	3	4	5	6	7	8	9	10	Final
Northern Ontario (Mutrie)	0	0	0	0	2	1	0	1	1	X	5
British Columbia (Sparkes)	1	3	2	2	0	0	1	0	0	X	9

Sheet C	1	2	3	4	5	6	7	8	9	10	Final
Alberta (Chernoff)	0	0	0	1	2	2	0	0	0	0	5
New Brunswick (Murray)	1	0	0	0	0	0	1	3	0	2	7

Sheet D	1	2	3	4	5	6	7	8	9	10	Final
Quebec (Ducat)	1	0	0	2	1	0	0	1	0	0	5
Manitoba (Harrison)	0	1	1	0	0	2	2	0	0	1	7

Sheet E	1	2	3	4	5	6	7	8	9	10	Final
Prince Edward Island (McDonald)	0	2	1	0	0	2	1	0	1	X	7
Ontario (Hodson)	0	0	0	1	1	0	0	1	0	X	3

Sheet F	1	2	3	4	5	6	7	8	9	10	11	Final
Saskatchewan (Folk)	1	1	1	0	1	0	1	0	1	0	1	7
Newfoundland (Rowe)	0	0	0	2	0	1	0	1	0	2	0	6

=== Draw 5 ===
Wednesday, March 8, 1:00 pm

Sheet A	1	2	3	4	5	6	7	8	9	10	Final
Quebec (Ducat)	0	2	1	1	0	0	0	1	0	1	6
Newfoundland (Rowe)	1	0	0	0	1	2	3	0	1	0	8

Sheet B	1	2	3	4	5	6	7	8	9	10	Final
Manitoba (Harrison)	3	0	0	0	0	2	0	0	0	X	5
Ontario (Hodson)	0	3	2	0	1	0	1	3	1	X	11

Sheet C	1	2	3	4	5	6	7	8	9	10	Final
Nova Scotia (Darragh)	0	2	0	2	1	0	2	0	1	0	8
Prince Edward Island (McDonald)	2	0	3	0	0	2	0	0	0	3	10

Sheet D	1	2	3	4	5	6	7	8	9	10	Final
Alberta (Chernoff)	0	3	2	0	1	0	2	0	0	X	8
Northern Ontario (Mutrie)	0	0	0	1	0	2	0	1	1	X	5

Sheet E	1	2	3	4	5	6	7	8	9	10	Final
Saskatchewan (Folk)	1	0	2	0	1	0	0	2	0	0	6
New Brunswick (Murray)	0	1	0	2	0	3	1	0	1	1	9

Sheet F	1	2	3	4	5	6	7	8	9	10	Final
Northwest Territories/Yukon (Brazeau)	1	0	0	0	0	1	0	1	0	1	4
British Columbia (Sparkes)	0	1	1	0	2	0	0	0	1	0	5

=== Draw 6 ===
Wednesday, March 8, 7:30 pm

Sheet A	1	2	3	4	5	6	7	8	9	10	Final
Saskatchewan (Folk)	2	0	1	2	2	0	1	0	0	X	8
Northern Ontario (Mutrie)	0	1	0	0	0	1	0	1	1	X	4

Sheet B	1	2	3	4	5	6	7	8	9	10	Final
Quebec (Ducat)	0	2	0	3	1	1	0	1	0	1	9
Prince Edward Island (McDonald)	3	0	1	0	0	0	2	0	1	0	7

Sheet C	1	2	3	4	5	6	7	8	9	10	Final
Newfoundland (Rowe)	0	0	0	1	1	1	1	0	0	X	4
Alberta (Chernoff)	1	2	1	0	0	0	0	1	1	X	6

Sheet D	1	2	3	4	5	6	7	8	9	10	Final
British Columbia (Sparkes)	1	1	1	2	1	1	0	2	0	X	9
New Brunswick (Murray)	0	0	0	0	0	0	4	0	0	X	4

Sheet E	1	2	3	4	5	6	7	8	9	10	Final
Ontario (Hodson)	0	2	0	1	0	1	0	1	X	X	5
Northwest Territories/Yukon (Brazeau)	2	0	3	0	2	0	5	0	X	X	12

Sheet F	1	2	3	4	5	6	7	8	9	10	Final
Nova Scotia (Darragh)	2	3	1	0	4	4	X	X	X	X	14
Manitoba (Harrison)	0	0	0	1	0	0	X	X	X	X	1

=== Draw 7 ===
Thursday, March 9, 1:00 pm

Sheet A	1	2	3	4	5	6	7	8	9	10	Final
Nova Scotia (Darragh)	0	0	1	2	0	1	0	1	1	0	6
Ontario (Hodson)	0	2	0	0	1	0	1	0	0	1	5

Sheet B	1	2	3	4	5	6	7	8	9	10	Final
Northwest Territories/Yukon (Brazeau)	0	1	0	0	1	0	2	0	0	X	4
New Brunswick (Murray)	1	0	2	1	0	1	0	1	1	X	7

Sheet C	1	2	3	4	5	6	7	8	9	10	11	Final
Saskatchewan (Folk)	0	0	1	0	2	0	2	0	0	1	1	7
British Columbia (Sparkes)	2	0	0	1	0	1	0	2	0	0	0	6

Sheet D	1	2	3	4	5	6	7	8	9	10	Final
Manitoba (Harrison)	1	0	1	0	0	2	0	0	0	X	4
Prince Edward Island (McDonald)	0	2	0	3	0	0	0	1	2	X	8

Sheet E	1	2	3	4	5	6	7	8	9	10	Final
Newfoundland (Rowe)	1	0	1	0	1	0	1	0	1	X	5
Northern Ontario (Mutrie)	0	2	0	3	0	1	0	2	0	X	8

Sheet F	1	2	3	4	5	6	7	8	9	10	11	Final
Alberta (Chernoff)	3	0	1	0	0	1	0	0	0	0	4	9
Quebec (Ducat)	0	1	0	1	0	0	2	0	0	1	0	5

=== Draw 8 ===
Thursday, March 9, 7:30 pm

Sheet A	1	2	3	4	5	6	7	8	9	10	Final
New Brunswick (Murray)	0	2	0	1	1	2	0	0	4	X	10
Manitoba (Harrison)	2	0	1	0	0	0	1	3	0	X	7

Sheet B	1	2	3	4	5	6	7	8	9	10	Final
Saskatchewan (Folk)	1	0	3	0	1	4	0	1	0	X	10
Nova Scotia (Darragh)	0	0	0	1	0	0	2	0	1	X	4

Sheet C	1	2	3	4	5	6	7	8	9	10	Final
Quebec (Ducat)	2	0	0	1	0	0	1	2	0	0	6
Ontario (Hodson)	0	1	2	0	2	0	0	0	1	1	7

Sheet D	1	2	3	4	5	6	7	8	9	10	Final
Northern Ontario (Mutrie)	0	1	0	1	0	0	1	0	0	X	3
Northwest Territories/Yukon (Brazeau)	0	0	3	0	0	2	0	0	2	X	7

Sheet E	1	2	3	4	5	6	7	8	9	10	Final
Alberta (Chernoff)	0	2	1	0	1	0	2	0	0	X	6
British Columbia (Sparkes)	1	0	0	1	0	1	0	1	1	X	5

Sheet F	1	2	3	4	5	6	7	8	9	10	Final
Newfoundland (Rowe)	0	1	0	0	1	2	1	1	2	X	8
Prince Edward Island (McDonald)	1	0	0	2	0	0	0	0	0	X	3

=== Draw 9 ===
Friday, March 10, 1:00 pm

Sheet A	1	2	3	4	5	6	7	8	9	10	Final
Northern Ontario (Mutrie)	0	2	3	1	0	1	0	1	1	X	9
Prince Edward Island (McDonald)	1	0	0	0	4	0	1	0	0	X	6

Sheet B	1	2	3	4	5	6	7	8	9	10	Final
British Columbia (Sparkes)	0	2	1	0	1	1	0	1	0	0	6
Quebec (Ducat)	2	0	0	1	0	0	1	0	1	0	5

Sheet C	1	2	3	4	5	6	7	8	9	10	Final
New Brunswick (Murray)	0	0	1	0	2	0	2	0	2	0	7
Newfoundland (Rowe)	0	1	0	2	0	1	0	2	0	3	9

Sheet D	1	2	3	4	5	6	7	8	9	10	Final
Nova Scotia (Darragh)	1	0	0	0	2	0	2	0	0	X	5
Alberta (Chernoff)	0	1	0	2	0	1	0	2	1	X	7

Sheet E	1	2	3	4	5	6	7	8	9	10	Final
Northwest Territories/Yukon (Brazeau)	2	0	0	2	0	0	1	0	1	X	6
Manitoba (Harrison)	0	1	0	0	3	1	0	2	0	X	7

Sheet F	1	2	3	4	5	6	7	8	9	10	Final
Ontario (Hodson)	1	0	0	1	1	0	0	1	0	X	4
Saskatchewan (Folk)	0	1	1	0	0	2	1	0	3	X	8

=== Draw 10 ===
Friday, March 10, 7:30 pm

Sheet A	1	2	3	4	5	6	7	8	9	10	Final
Alberta (Chernoff)	0	0	0	2	0	0	1	0	X	X	3
Saskatchewan (Folk)	2	1	3	0	2	4	0	1	X	X	13

Sheet B	1	2	3	4	5	6	7	8	9	10	Final
Newfoundland (Rowe)	0	3	0	0	0	0	1	0	2	2	8
Manitoba (Harrison)	1	0	1	1	0	1	0	3	0	0	7

Sheet C	1	2	3	4	5	6	7	8	9	10	Final
Prince Edward Island (McDonald)	0	3	0	1	3	2	0	0	X	X	9
Northwest Territories/Yukon (Brazeau)	2	0	1	0	0	0	2	0	X	X	5

Sheet D	1	2	3	4	5	6	7	8	9	10	Final
Ontario (Hodson)	0	0	0	2	0	1	2	0	X	X	5
British Columbia (Sparkes)	1	2	1	0	3	0	0	4	X	X	11

Sheet E	1	2	3	4	5	6	7	8	9	10	Final
Quebec (Ducat)	1	1	0	2	0	0	0	2	0	X	6
Nova Scotia (Darragh)	0	0	1	0	2	2	2	0	2	X	9

Sheet F	1	2	3	4	5	6	7	8	9	10	Final
New Brunswick (Murray)	3	1	1	0	2	0	0	2	0	X	9
Northern Ontario (Mutrie)	0	0	0	2	0	2	0	0	2	X	6

=== Draw 11 ===
Saturday, March 11, 11:45 am

Sheet A	1	2	3	4	5	6	7	8	9	10	Final
Newfoundland (Rowe)	2	0	0	0	0	0	2	0	1	2	7
Northwest Territories/Yukon (Brazeau)	0	1	1	1	0	1	0	1	0	0	5

Sheet B	1	2	3	4	5	6	7	8	9	10	Final
British Columbia (Sparkes)	2	0	2	0	0	0	3	0	1	X	8
Nova Scotia (Darragh)	0	2	0	1	1	0	0	1	0	X	5

Sheet C	1	2	3	4	5	6	7	8	9	10	Final
Ontario (Hodson)	1	0	1	1	0	0	1	0	0	X	4
Alberta (Chernoff)	0	1	0	0	2	3	0	2	2	X	10

Sheet D	1	2	3	4	5	6	7	8	9	10	11	Final
Saskatchewan (Folk)	0	1	1	1	0	2	1	0	1	0	1	8
Quebec (Ducat)	1	0	0	0	2	0	0	2	0	2	0	7

Sheet E	1	2	3	4	5	6	7	8	9	10	Final
New Brunswick (Murray)	0	0	1	1	0	0	2	0	0	X	4
Prince Edward Island (McDonald)	1	3	0	0	2	1	0	2	2	X	11

Sheet F	1	2	3	4	5	6	7	8	9	10	Final
Manitoba (Harrison)	0	0	1	2	0	1	0	1	4	X	9
Northern Ontario (Mutrie)	2	1	0	0	1	0	0	0	0	X	4

== Awards ==
=== All-Star Team ===
The media selected the following curlers as All-Stars.

Position	Name	Team
Skip	Rick Folk (2)	Saskatchewan
Third	Mike Chernoff (Skip)	Alberta
Second	Al Cook	British Columbia
Lead	Keiven Bauer (2)	British Columbia

=== Ross G.L. Harstone Award ===
The Ross Harstone Award was presented to the player chosen by their fellow peers as the curler who best represented Harstone's high ideals of good sportsmanship, observance of the rules, exemplary conduct and curling ability.

Name	Team	Position
Pete Murray	New Brunswick	Skip
