= Mike Chernoff (curler) =

Canadian curler

- Curler ♂
- Born: 1936 (age 89–90); Kamsack, Saskatchewan, Canada

Team
- Curling club: Medicine Hat CC, Medicine Hat, AB, North Hill CC, Calgary, AB

Curling career
- Member Association: Saskatchewan (1953-1954); Ontario (1957-1959); Alberta (1959-1983); British Columbia (1983-present)
- Brier: 3: (1964, 1978, 1983)
- World Championship: 1 (1978)
Medal record
Curling
Representing Canada
World Championships
Bronze medal – third place	1978 Winnipeg
Macdonald Brier
Representing Alberta
Gold medal – first place	1978 Vancouver
Silver medal – second place	1983 Sudbury

Michael N. Chernoff (born c. 1936) is a Canadian curler and geologist from West Vancouver, British Columbia. He is a 1978 World Men's bronze medallist and a 1978 Brier champion.

== Personal life ==
Chernoff has a degree in geological engineering from Queen's University at Kingston. He was born in Kamsack, Saskatchewan. He is married to Dorine. After graduating from Queens, Chernoff worked as a geologist, conducting field studies across Canada for several oil and gas companies including California Standard, Pinnacle Petroleum, and Ulster Petroleum. He founded Strom Resources in 1979, and sold it to PennWest. He founded Paclata Resources in 1987 with his son Bruce, developing oil and gas operations in a number of different countries. It was sold to Alberta Energy Company in 1999.

He was a director at Encana (now Ovintiv) and Canadian Hydro Developers.

== Teams ==
Season	Skip	Third	Second	Lead	Events
1958–59	Mike Chernoff	Doug Rawson	Jake Edwards	Bob Elliott	Ont. 1959 (silver)
1964	Ron Northcott	Mike Chernoff	Ron Baker	Fred Storey	Brier 1964 (5th)
1977–78	Ed Lukowich (fourth)	Mike Chernoff (skip)	Dale Johnston	Ron Schindle	Brier 1978 (gold); WCC 1978 (bronze)
1980–81	Ed Lukowich	Mike Chernoff	Neil Houston	Brent Syme	
1981–82	Ed Lukowich	Mike Chernoff (skip)	John Ferguson	Wayne Hart	
1982–83	Ed Lukowich	Mike Chernoff (skip)	Neil Houston	Brent Syme	Brier 1983 (silver)
