= Joe Roberts (curler) =

American curler

- Curler ♂

Team
- Curling club: Hibbing CC

Curling career
- Member Association: United States
- World Championship: 2 (1976, 1984)
Medal record
Curling
World Championships
Gold medal – first place	1976 Duluth
United States Men's Championship
Gold medal – first place	1976 Wausau
Gold medal – first place	1984 Hibbing

Joe Roberts is an American curler from Hibbing, Minnesota.

He is a 1976 World Men's champion and a two-time United States men's curling champion (1976, 1984).

== Awards ==
- United States Curling Association Hall of Fame:
  - 1994 (with all 1976 world champions team: skip Bruce Roberts, second Gary Kleffman and lead Jerry Scott).

== Personal life ==
His older brother Bruce is a curler too and Joe's teammate.

== Teams ==
Season	Skip	Third	Second	Lead	Events
1974–75	Bruce Roberts	Joe Roberts	Gary Kleffman	Jerry Scott	USMCC 1975
1975–76	Bruce Roberts	Joe Roberts	Gary Kleffman	Jerry Scott	USMCC 1976 (gold); WCC 1976 (gold)
1976–77	Bruce Roberts	Paul Pustovar; Joe Roberts	Gary Kleffman	Jerry Scott	USMCC 1977 (gold); WCC 1977 (4th)
1977–78	Bruce Roberts	Joe Roberts	Gary Kleffman	Jerry Scott	USMCC 1978
1983–84	Joe Roberts (fourth)	Bruce Roberts (skip)	Gary Kleffman	Jerry Scott	USMCC 1984 (gold); WCC 1984 (6th)
2011–12	Tom Scott	Joe Roberts	Tony Wilson	Benjamin Wilson	
