= Nick Jerulle =

American curler

- Curler

Team
- Curling club: Hibbing CC, Hibbing, MN
- Skip: Dick Brown
- Third: Terry Kleffman
- Second: Fran Kleffman
- Lead: Nick Jerulle
Medal record
Representing the United States
Men's Curling
World Championships
Silver medal – second place	1962 Falkirk	Team
US Men's Championship
Gold medal – first place	1959 Green Bay
Gold medal – first place	1962 Detroit

Nick Jerulle is an American curler. Jerulle played lead on a team out of Hibbing Curling Club in Hibbing, Minnesota which won the US National Championship two times, in 1959 and 1962. The team was a family affair other than Jerulle, consisting of Fran Kleffman at second, Kleffman's son Terry Kleffman at third, and Fran Kleffman's son-in-law Dick Brown at skip. In 1962 the team went on to represent the United States at the World Championship, which was then called the 1962 Scotch Cup. This was only the second time the United States had competed in the Championship. Jerulle's team finished with a 4-2 record, good enough to earn them the silver medal.
