= Jerry Scott (curler) =

American curler

- Curler ♂

Team
- Curling club: Hibbing CC, Hibbing, MN

Curling career
- Member Association: United States
- World Championship: 4 (1976, 1977, 1980, 1984)
Medal record
Curling
World Championships
Gold medal – first place	1976 Duluth
United States Men's Championship
Gold medal – first place	1976 Wausau
Gold medal – first place	1977 Northbrook
Gold medal – first place	1980 Bemidji
Gold medal – first place	1984 Hibbing

Jerry Scott is an American curler from Hibbing, Minnesota.

He is a 1976 World Men's champion and a four-time United States men's curling champion (1976, 1977, 1980, 1984).

== Awards ==
- United States Curling Association Hall of Fame:
  - 1994 (with all 1976 world champions team: skip Bruce Roberts, third Joe Roberts and second Gary Kleffman).

== Teams ==
Season	Skip	Third	Second	Lead	Events
1973–74	Gary Kleffman	Jerry Scott	Rick Novak	Ben Gardeski	USJCC 1974 (gold)
1974–75	Bruce Roberts	Joe Roberts	Gary Kleffman	Jerry Scott	USMCC 1975
1975–76	Bruce Roberts	Joe Roberts	Gary Kleffman	Jerry Scott	USMCC 1976 (gold); WCC 1976 (gold)
1976–77	Bruce Roberts	Paul Pustovar; Joe Roberts	Gary Kleffman	Jerry Scott	USMCC 1977 (gold); WCC 1977 (4th)
1977–78	Bruce Roberts	Joe Roberts	Gary Kleffman	Jerry Scott	USMCC 1978
1979–80	Paul Pustovar	John Jankila	Gary Kleffman	Jerry Scott	USMCC 1980 (gold); WCC 1980 (5th)
1983–84	Joe Roberts (fourth)	Bruce Roberts (skip)	Gary Kleffman	Jerry Scott	USMCC 1984 (gold); WCC 1984 (6th)
