= John Jankila =

American curler

- Curler ♂

Team
- Curling club: Hibbing CC, Hibbing, MN

Curling career
- Member Association: United States
- World Championship: 1 (1980)
Medal record
Curling
United States Men's Championship
Gold medal – first place	1980 Bemidji
Silver medal – second place	1982 Brookline

John Jankila is an American curler.

At the national level, he is a 1980 United States men's curling champion.

== Teams ==
Season	Skip	Third	Second	Lead	Events
1979–80	Paul Pustovar	John Jankila	Gary Kleffman	Jerry Scott	USMCC 1980 (gold); WCC 1980 (5th)
1981–82	Paul Pustovar	John Jankila	Vince Taddei	Jeff Perrella	USMCC 1982 (silver)
