= Tore Rydman =

Swedish male curler

- Curler ♂
- Born: October 11, 1914; Norrköping
- Died: January 3, 2003 (aged 88)

Team
- Curling club: Örebro CK, Örebro

Curling career
- Member Association: Sweden
- World Championship: 1 (1965)
Medal record
Curling
World Championships
Bronze medal – third place	1965 Perth
Swedish Men's Championship
Gold medal – first place	1965

Tore Rydman (October 11, 1914 – January 3, 2003) was a Swedish curler.

He was a 1965 World Men's bronze medallist and a 1965 Swedish men's curling champion.

In 1966 he was inducted into the Swedish Curling Hall of Fame.

== Teams ==
Season	Skip	Third	Second	Lead	Events
1964–65	Tore Rydman (fourth)	Gunnar Kullendorf (skip)	Sigurd Rydén	Börje Holmgren	SMCC 1965 (gold); WCC 1965 (bronze)
