= 1957 United States Men's Curling Championship =

- Host city: Chicago, Illinois
- Arena: Chicago Stadium
- Dates: March 27–30
- Winner: Minnesota
- Curling club: Hibbing CC, Hibbing
- Skip: Harold Lauber
- Third: Louis Lauber
- Second: Peter Beasy
- Lead: Matt Berklich
- Alternate: Irwin Akin

The 1957 United States Men's Curling Championship was held from March 27 to 30, 1957 at Chicago Stadium in Chicago, Illinois. It was the first edition of the United States Men's Curling Championship.

The Marshall Field and Company was inspired to host an American equivalent to the popular Macdonald Brier in Canada. Opening night of the championship included a performance by the Scotch Highlander band of University of Iowa, an all female bagpipe and drum band, and were televised by the local television channel WGN-TV. Ken Watson, three-time Canadian champion, was hired as the commissioner of play and tasked with overseeing the umpires. There were 2,500 spectators in attendance for the first draw.

The tournament consisted of ten teams representing nine states, plus a team representing the then-territory of Alaska. Teams had to win their state playdowns to qualify.

The team from Minnesota, representing the Hibbing Curling Club won the event, as the team with the best round-robin record of 8-1.

== Teams ==
Skip	Third	Second	Lead	Locale
Alvin Johnson	Clarence Renkoski	Joseph Jackovich	Gene Williams	Fairbanks Curling Club, Alaska Territory
Bob Fletcher	Charlie Hill	Bob Swinney	Bob Soutar	Chicago Curling Club, Illinois
Howard Eteson	J. Paul Sheeran	Keith Fulton	Robert Ingersoll	Winchester Country Club, Massachusetts
J. Nelson Brown	Douglas Fisk	George Specht	Rudy Speerschneider	Detroit Curling Club, Michigan
Harold Lauber	Louis Lauber	Peter Beasy	Matt Berklich	Hibbing Curling Club, Minnesota
Karl Hines Jr.	Harry Coronis	Jason Bickford	Robert Maxwell	Nashua Country Club, New Hampshire
W. J. W. Reid	W. Haight	Donald Dunn	Junius Cooper	Saint Andrew's Golf Club, New York
Clarence Johnson	Wayne Smith	Kenneth Smith	Harry Mowbray	Minot Curling Club, North Dakota
Alex St. Pierre	Kenneth Sherwood	Charles Geis	Richard Horswill	Seattle Curling Club, Washington
Bruce Rogers	J. Robert Curtis	Harold Sommers	Howard Winkler	Portage Curling Club, Wisconsin

== Round robin standings ==
Final round robin standings

Key
Champion

Team (Locale)	Skip	W	L
Minnesota (Hibbing)	Harold Lauber	8	1
Illinois (Chicago)	Bob Fletcher	7	2
North Dakota (Minot)	Clarence Johnson	6	3
Wisconsin (Portage)	Bruce Rogers	6	3
Michigan (Detroit)	J. Nelson Brown	6	3
Washington (Seattle)	Alex St. Pierre	4	5
New Hampshire (Nashua)	Karl Hines Jr.	3	6
Alaska Territory (Fairbanks)	Alvin Johnson	2	7
Massachusetts (Winchester)	Howard Eteson	2	7
New York (St. Andrew's)	W. J. W. Reid	1	8

== Round Robin results ==
=== Draw 1 ===
Wednesday, March 27, 8:00 pm

Team	1	2	3	4	5	6	7	8	9	10	Final
Alaska Territory (A. Johnson)	1	1	0	0	3	2	3	2	1	4	17
Washington (St. Pierre)	0	0	1	1	0	0	0	0	0	0	2

Team	1	2	3	4	5	6	7	8	9	10	Final
Massachusetts (Eteson)	3	2	0	0	1	0	3	0	2	1	12
New York (Reid)	0	0	1	2	0	2	0	1	0	0	6

Team	1	2	3	4	5	6	7	8	9	10	Final
Illinois (Fletcher)	3	0	0	3	1	0	1	0	1	1	10
Wisconsin (Rogers)	0	1	1	0	0	1	0	2	0	0	5

Team	1	2	3	4	5	6	7	8	9	10	Final
Michigan (Brown)	2	2	0	1	1	2	4	0	4	0	16
North Dakota (C. Johnson)	0	0	1	0	0	0	0	4	0	3	8

Team	1	2	3	4	5	6	7	8	9	10	Final
Minnesota (Lauber)	2	0	4	0	0	0	2	5	0	2	15
New Hampshire (Hines)	0	2	0	1	1	3	0	0	1	0	8

=== Draw 2 ===
Thursday, March 28, 9:30 am

Team	1	2	3	4	5	6	7	8	9	10	Final
Minnesota (Lauber)	0	5	1	0	0	0	5	1	1	1	14
Alaska Territory (A. Johnson)	3	0	0	1	2	1	0	0	0	0	7

Team	1	2	3	4	5	6	7	8	9	10	Final
Wisconsin (Rogers)	3	0	0	2	1	0	0	1	0	1	8
Michigan (Brown)	0	2	1	0	0	1	1	0	2	0	7

Team	1	2	3	4	5	6	7	8	9	10	Final
Illinois (Fletcher)	3	3	1	1	0	3	0	1	2	1	15
New Hampshire (Hines)	0	0	0	0	1	0	2	0	0	0	3

Team	1	2	3	4	5	6	7	8	9	10	Final
Washington (St. Pierre)	1	2	0	0	1	2	0	1	0	0	7
New York (Reid)	0	0	1	1	0	0	1	0	2	1	6

Team	1	2	3	4	5	6	7	8	9	10	Final
North Dakota (C. Johnson)	2	0	1	0	2	1	0	4	0	0	10
Massachusetts (Eteson)	0	1	0	1	0	0	2	0	1	1	6

=== Draw 3 ===
Thursday, March 28, 2:00 pm

Team	1	2	3	4	5	6	7	8	9	10	Final
North Dakota (C. Johnson)	3	0	0	0	5	1	0	1	0	1	11
Washington (St. Pierre)	0	2	3	1	0	0	1	0	1	0	8

Team	1	2	3	4	5	6	7	8	9	10	Final
Minnesota (Lauber)	5	0	4	1	0	3	1	0	1	0	15
Massachusetts (Eteson)	0	2	0	0	1	0	0	1	0	1	5

Team	1	2	3	4	5	6	7	8	9	10	Final
Wisconsin (Rogers)	2	0	5	1	1	2	0	4	0	1	16
Alaska Territory (A. Johnson)	0	1	0	0	0	0	1	0	2	0	4

Team	1	2	3	4	5	6	7	8	9	10	Final
Illinois (Fletcher)	3	0	1	0	4	0	1	1	1	0	11
Michigan (Brown)	0	2	0	1	0	1	0	0	0	1	5

Team	1	2	3	4	5	6	7	8	9	10	Final
New York (Reid)	0	2	2	3	2	1	4	2	1	1	18
New Hampshire (Hines)	4	0	0	0	0	0	0	0	0	0	4

=== Draw 4 ===
Thursday, March 28, 8:00 pm

Team	1	2	3	4	5	6	7	8	9	10	Final
Michigan (Brown)	3	3	0	1	3	1	0	1	1	0	13
New Hampshire (Hines)	0	0	1	0	0	0	1	0	0	4	6

Team	1	2	3	4	5	6	7	8	9	10	Final
North Dakota (C. Johnson)	2	0	0	4	0	0	4	1	1	1	13
New York (Reid)	0	1	1	0	2	1	0	0	0	0	5

Team	1	2	3	4	5	6	7	8	9	10	Final
Minnesota (Lauber)	0	0	2	3	1	2	2	0	2	0	12
Washington (St. Pierre)	2	1	0	0	0	0	0	1	0	1	5

Team	1	2	3	4	5	6	7	8	9	10	Final
Wisconsin (Rogers)	2	2	1	2	3	1	3	1	3	0	18
Massachusetts (Eteson)	0	0	0	0	0	0	0	0	0	2	2

Team	1	2	3	4	5	6	7	8	9	10	11	Final
Alaska Territory (A. Johnson)	0	0	5	1	1	0	5	0	0	0	0	12
Illinois (Fletcher)	2	1	0	0	0	5	0	1	2	1	3	15

=== Draw 5 ===
Friday, March 29, 9:30 am

Team	1	2	3	4	5	6	7	8	9	10	Final
Wisconsin (Rogers)	1	1	2	2	0	0	1	0	0	2	9
New York (Reid)	0	0	0	0	1	2	0	2	1	0	6

Team	1	2	3	4	5	6	7	8	9	10	Final
Minnesota (Lauber)	4	0	2	0	2	0	1	1	0	0	10
Illinois (Fletcher)	0	1	0	2	0	2	0	0	2	1	8

Team	1	2	3	4	5	6	7	8	9	10	Final
Massachusetts (Eteson)	2	0	3	1	1	3	2	0	2	0	14
Alaska Territory (A. Johnson)	0	2	0	0	0	0	0	1	0	1	4

Team	1	2	3	4	5	6	7	8	9	10	Final
North Dakota (C. Johnson)	0	1	0	1	0	0	2	2	4	1	11
New Hampshire (Hines)	1	0	1	0	2	2	0	0	0	0	6

Team	1	2	3	4	5	6	7	8	9	10	Final
Washington (St. Pierre)	2	1	0	1	0	1	0	1	0	1	8
Michigan (Brown)	0	0	2	0	1	0	1	0	1	0	5

=== Draw 6 ===
Friday, March 29, 2:00 pm

Team	1	2	3	4	5	6	7	8	9	10	Final
Washington (St. Pierre)	0	1	2	0	0	1	1	0	2	1	8
Illinois (Fletcher)	2	0	0	1	1	0	0	1	0	0	5

Team	1	2	3	4	5	6	7	8	9	10	Final
North Dakota (C. Johnson)	0	0	0	0	2	2	0	3	0	2	9
Wisconsin (Rogers)	2	1	1	1	0	0	1	0	1	0	7

Team	1	2	3	4	5	6	7	8	9	10	Final
Minnesota (Lauber)	0	0	5	5	0	1	1	1	0	2	15
New York (Reid)	1	1	0	0	1	0	0	0	2	0	5

Team	1	2	3	4	5	6	7	8	9	10	11	Final
Michigan (Brown)	1	0	2	0	1	3	0	0	0	0	1	8
Alaska Territory (A. Johnson)	0	1	0	1	0	0	1	2	1	1	0	7

Team	1	2	3	4	5	6	7	8	9	10	Final
New Hampshire (Hines)	4	1	0	3	1	0	1	0	2	0	12
Massachusetts (Eteson)	0	0	1	0	0	4	0	1	0	2	8

=== Draw 7 ===
Friday, March 29, 8:00 pm

Team	1	2	3	4	5	6	7	8	9	10	Final
Michigan (Brown)	1	0	1	0	2	4	0	1	1	3	13
Massachusetts (Eteson)	0	1	0	1	0	0	1	0	0	0	3

Team	1	2	3	4	5	6	7	8	9	10	Final
Washington (St. Pierre)	0	4	1	0	0	0	0	1	0	1	7
New Hampshire (Hines)	1	0	0	3	1	3	1	0	2	0	11

Team	1	2	3	4	5	6	7	8	9	10	Final
Illinois (Fletcher)	1	2	0	6	0	2	0	0	0	0	11
North Dakota (C. Johnson)	0	0	2	0	3	0	1	1	1	2	10

Team	1	2	3	4	5	6	7	8	9	10	Final
Minnesota (Lauber)	2	1	3	0	0	1	1	1	2	0	11
Wisconsin (Rogers)	0	0	0	2	1	0	0	0	0	1	4

Team	1	2	3	4	5	6	7	8	9	10	Final
Alaska Territory (A. Johnson)	1	3	0	3	0	3	4	1	0	1	16
New York (Reid)	0	0	2	0	1	0	0	0	2	0	5

=== Draw 8 ===
Saturday, March 30, 12:30 pm

Team	Final
Michigan (Brown)	12
Minnesota (Lauber)	11

Team	Final
North Dakota (C. Johnson)	11
Alaska Territory (A. Johnson)	9

Team	Final
Illinois (Fletcher)	13
New York (Reid)	7

Team	Final
Washington (St. Pierre)	7
Massachusetts (Eteson)	6

Team	Final
Wisconsin (Rogers)	W
New Hampshire (Hines)	L

=== Draw 9 ===
Saturday, March 30, 8:00 pm

Team	Final
Minnesota (Lauber)	12
North Dakota (C. Johnson)	6

Team	Final
Wisconsin (Rogers)	11
Washington (St. Pierre)	7

Team	Final
Michigan (Brown)	10
New York (Reid)	8

Team	Final
Illinois (Fletcher)	W
Massachusetts (Eteson)	L

Team	Final
New Hampshire (Hines)	10
Alaska Territory (A. Johnson)	9
