= Ann Brown (curler) =

American curler

- Curler
- Died: May 23, 2006; Skokie, Illinois

Team
- Curling club: Exmoor Curling Club

Ann Brown was an American curler who was elected to the United States Curling Association Hall of Fame in 1993.

== Curling history ==
Brown began curling in 1969 at the Exmoor Curling Club in Illinois. She went on to win the United States Women's Curling Association national bonspiel seven times, primarily playing as skip or vice-skip. She also won the Women's Championship in Illinois six times and the Illinois State Mixed Championship two times, the later playing with her husband Larry.

In 1985, Brown was one of the founding directors of the United States Women's Curling Association. From 1986 until 1987, Brown served as the president of the United States Women's Curling Association. In 1991, Brown became the first women to serve as president of the United States Curling Association. Brown also played a key role in bringing curling to the Olympics, which debuted at the 1998 Winter Olympics held in Nagano, Japan. Brown was one of the senior curling officials at the 2002 Winter Olympics held in Salt Lake City, Utah and served as the United States representative to the World Curling Federation for six years.

Brown died at age 71 of pancreatic cancer in 2006.

== Awards and honors ==
Brown was elected to the United States Curling Association Hall of Fame in 1993. USA Curling awards the Ann Brown sportsmanship award each year to one male and one female athlete competing in the United States Men's Curling Championship or United States Women's Curling Championship who embody the "spirit of curling".
