= Mary Van Ess =

American curler

- Curler

Team
- Curling club: Wauwatosa Curling Club

Mary Van Ess was an American curler who became the first woman elected to the United States Curling Association Hall of Fame in 1991.

== Curling history ==
Van Ess was the United States representative to the International Curling Federation from 1981 until 1991, and was on the Ladies Committee for six of those years including two years as president. She managed the United States' women's curling team at the 1988 Winter Olympics where curling was a demonstration sport. Van Ess was the president of the women's Wauwatosa Curling Club from 1976-1977, and president of the United States Women's Curling Association from 1980 until 1981.

== Awards and honors ==
Van Ess was elected to the United States Curling Association Hall of Fame in 1991. In 1993, the Wauwatosa Curling Club elected Van Ess an honorary member of the club.
