= Gary Kleffman =

American curler

- Curler ♂

Team
- Curling club: Hibbing CC, Hibbing, MN

Curling career
- Member Association: United States
- World Championship: 4 (1976, 1977, 1980, 1984)
Medal record
Curling
World Championships
Gold medal – first place	1976 Duluth
United States Men's Championship
Gold medal – first place	1976 Wausau
Gold medal – first place	1977 Northbrook
Gold medal – first place	1980 Bemidji
Gold medal – first place	1984 Hibbing

Gary Kleffman is an American curler from Hibbing, Minnesota.

He is a 1976 World Men's champion and a four-times United States men's curling champion (1976, 1977, 1980, 1984).

== Awards ==
- United States Curling Association Hall of Fame:
  - 1994 (with all 1976 world champions team: skip Bruce Roberts, third Joe Roberts and lead Jerry Scott).

== Teams ==
Season	Skip	Third	Second	Lead	Alternate	Events
1973–74	Gary Kleffman	Jerry Scott	Rick Novak	Ben Gardeski		USJCC 1974 (gold)
1974–75	Bruce Roberts	Joe Roberts	Gary Kleffman	Jerry Scott		USMCC 1975
1975–76	Bruce Roberts	Joe Roberts	Gary Kleffman	Jerry Scott		USMCC 1976 (gold); WCC 1976 (gold)
1976–77	Bruce Roberts	Paul Pustovar; Joe Roberts	Gary Kleffman	Jerry Scott		USMCC 1977 (gold); WCC 1977 (4th)
1977–78	Bruce Roberts	Joe Roberts	Gary Kleffman	Jerry Scott		USMCC 1978
1979–80	Paul Pustovar	John Jankila	Gary Kleffman	Jerry Scott		USMCC 1980 (gold); WCC 1980 (5th)
1982–83	Scott Baird	Bruce Roberts	Gary Kleffman	Mark Haluptzok	Craig Polski	USMCC 1983 (5th)
1983–84	Joe Roberts (fourth)	Bruce Roberts (skip)	Gary Kleffman	Jerry Scott		USMCC 1984 (gold); WCC 1984 (6th)
