= 1965 Scotch Cup =

- Host city: Perth, Scotland
- Arena: Perth Ice Rink
- Dates: 15–18 March 1965
- Winner: United States
- Curling club: Superior CC, Superior, Wisconsin
- Skip: Bud Somerville
- Third: Bill Strum
- Second: Al Gagne
- Lead: Tom Wright
- Finalist: Canada

The 1965 Scotch Cup was the seventh edition of the Scotch Cup and was held from 15 to 18 March in Perth, Scotland at the Perth Ice Rink.

Six teams entered the competition with the final seeing the United States claim an upset victory over Canada with the team winning the final two ends of the match to record their first title with a 9-6 victory.

== Teams ==
Canada	Norway	Scotland
Granite CC, Winnipeg, Manitoba Skip: Terry Braunstein; Third: Don Duguid; Second: Gordon McTavish; Lead: Ray Turnbull	Frogner CC, Oslo Skip: Ulf Engh; Third: Arne Ramstad; Second: Rolf Carlem; Lead: Perfinn Hansen	Kilgraston & Moncrieffe CC, Perth Skip: Chuck Hay; Third: John Bryden; Second: Alan Glen; Lead: David Howie
Sweden	Switzerland	United States
Örebro CK Fourth: Tore Rydman; Skip: Gunnar Kullendorf*; Second: Sigurd Rydén; Lead: Börje Holmgren	Zermatt CC Skip: Theo Welschen; Third: Hermann Truffer; Second: Karl Bayard; Lead: Alfonse Biner	Superior CC, Wisconsin Skip: Raymond "Bud" Somerville; Third: Bill Strum; Second: Al Gagne; Lead: Tom Wright

*Throws third rocks.

== Standings ==
Country	Skip	W	L
United States	Bud Somerville	4	1
Canada	Terry Braunstein	4	1
Sweden	Gunnar Kullendorf	3	2
Scotland	Chuck Hay	3	2
Switzerland	Theo Welschen	1	4
Norway	Ulf Engh	0	5

== Results ==
=== Draw 1 ===
Team	1	2	3	4	5	6	7	8	9	10	11	12	Final
Canada (Braunstein)	0	1	0	2	2	0	0	2	0	1	0	0	8
Sweden (Kullendorf)	0	0	1	0	0	2	2	0	1	0	1	0	6

Team	Final
Scotland (Hay)	11
United States (Somerville)	5

Team	Final
Switzerland (Welschen)	11
Norway (Engh)	8

=== Draw 2 ===
Team	1	2	3	4	5	6	7	8	9	10	11	12	Final
United States (Somerville)	1	3	0	1	0	1	0	1	0	0	1	1	9
Canada (Braunstein)	0	0	2	0	2	0	2	0	0	2	0	0	8

Team	Final
Scotland (Hay)	12
Norway (Engh)	8

Team	Final
Sweden (Kullendorf)	10
Switzerland (Welschen)	9

=== Draw 3 ===
Team	1	2	3	4	5	6	7	8	9	10	11	12	Final
Canada (Braunstein)	1	1	1	0	0	3	0	2	0	0	3	0	11
Norway (Engh)	0	0	0	1	1	0	1	0	2	1	0	1	7

Team	Final
Scotland (Hay)	29
Switzerland (Welschen)	8

Team	Final
United States (Somerville)	9
Sweden (Kullendorf)	7

=== Draw 4 ===
Team	Final
Canada (Braunstein)	19
Switzerland (Welschen)	3

Team	Final
United States (Somerville)	22
Norway (Engh)	5

Team	Final
Sweden (Kullendorf)	10
Scotland (Hay)	9

=== Draw 5 ===
Team	Final
Canada (Braunstein)	9
Scotland (Hay)	7

Team	Final
United States (Somerville)	22
Switzerland (Welschen)	3

Team	Final
Sweden (Kullendorf)	8
Norway (Engh)	7

== Playoffs ==
Semi-final
1	United States	14
3	Sweden	5
2	Canada	8
4	Scotland	4

Final
1	United States	9
2	Canada	6

=== Semifinals ===
Team	Final
United States (Somerville)	14
Sweden (Kullendorf)	5

Team	1	2	3	4	5	6	7	8	9	10	11	12	Final
Scotland (Hay)	0	0	0	0	1	0	0	1	1	0	1	0	4
Canada (Braunstein)	1	0	0	2	0	0	3	0	0	1	0	1	8

=== Final ===
Team	1	2	3	4	5	6	7	8	9	10	11	12	Final
United States (Somerville)	1	0	1	0	1	2	1	1	0	0	1	1	9
Canada (Braunstein)	0	2	0	1	0	0	0	0	2	1	0	0	6

1965 Scotch Cup Winners
(United States)
United States
1st title
