= 1974 Air Canada Silver Broom =

- Host city: Bern, Switzerland
- Arena: Allmend Eisstadion
- Dates: March 18–23, 1974
- Winner: United States
- Curling club: Superior CC, Wisconsin, United States
- Skip: Raymond "Bud" Somerville
- Third: Bob Nichols
- Second: Bill Strum
- Lead: Tom Locken
- Finalist: Sweden

The 1974 Air Canada Silver Broom, the men's world curling championship, was held from March 18 to 23 at the Allmend Eisstadion in Bern, Switzerland.

== Teams ==
Canada	Denmark	France	Germany	Italy
St. Albert CC, St. Albert Skip: Hector Gervais; Third: Ron Anton; Second: Warren Hansen; Lead: Darrel Sutton	Hvidovre CC, Hvidovre Skip: Flemming Pedersen; Third: Arne Pedersen; Second: Arvid Petersen; Lead: Hans Henriksen	Megève CC, Megève Skip: Pierre Duclos; Third: Raymond Bouvet; Second: Maurice Mercier; Lead: Aldo Merlin	EC Oberstdorf, Oberstdorf Skip: Manfred Räderer; Third: Franz Sperger; Second: Hansjörg Jacoby; Lead: Roland Liedtke	Cortina CC, Cortina d'Ampezzo Skip: Renato Ghezze; Third: Lino Mariani Maier; Second: Roberto Zangara; Lead: Andrea Pavani
Norway	Scotland	Sweden	Switzerland	United States
Brumunddal CC, Oslo Skip: Sjur Loen; Third: Hans Bekkelund; Second: Morten Søgaard; Lead: Hans Økelsrud	Hamilton & Thornyhill CC, Hamilton Skip: Jimmy Waddell; Third: Jim Steele; Second: Robert Kirkland; Lead: Willie Frame	Sundsvalls CK, Sundsvall Skip: Jan Ullsten; Third: Tom Berggren; Second: Anders Grahn; Lead: Roger Bredin	Dübendorf CC, Dübendorf Skip: Peter Attinger Jr. Third: Bernhard Attinger; Second: Mattias Neuenschwander; Lead: Jürg Geiler	Superior CC, Superior Skip: Raymond "Bud" Somerville; Third: Bob Nichols; Second: Bill Strum; Lead: Tom Locken

== Round-robin standings ==
Country	Skip	W	L
Switzerland	Peter Attinger, Jr.	9	0
Canada	Hector Gervais	7	2
Sweden	Jan Ullsten	6	3
United States	Bud Somerville	6	3
Denmark	Flemming Pedersen	4	5
France	Pierre Duclos	4	5
Germany	Manfred Räderer	4	5
Scotland	Jimmy Waddell	2	7
Norway	Sjur Loen	2	7
Italy	Renato Ghezze	1	8

== Round-robin results ==
=== Draw 1 ===
Team	Final
United States (Somerville)	10
Denmark (Pedersen)	4

Team	Final
Norway (Loen)	3
Canada (Gervais)	7

Team	Final
Switzerland (Attinger)	6
France (Duclos)	5

Team	Final
Scotland (Waddell)	3
Italy (Ghezze)	6

Team	Final
Sweden (Ullsten)	4
Germany (Räderer)	3

=== Draw 2 ===
Team	Final
Italy (Ghezze)	2
Germany (Räderer)	11

Team	Final
France (Duclos)	5
Scotland (Waddell)	7

Team	Final
United States (Somerville)	8
Norway (Loen)	4

Team	Final
Switzerland (Attinger)	6
Sweden (Ullsten)	2

Team	Final
Denmark (Pedersen)	2
Canada (Gervais)	11

=== Draw 3 ===
Team	Final
Norway (Loen)	4
Scotland (Waddell)	8

Team	Final
United States (Somerville)	6
Germany (Räderer)	10

Team	Final
Denmark (Pedersen)	7
Sweden (Ullsten)	10

Team	Final
Canada (Gervais)	9
France (Duclos)	2

Team	Final
Switzerland (Attinger)	10
Italy (Ghezze)	2

=== Draw 4 ===
Team	Final
United States (Somerville)	7
Canada (Gervais)	3

Team	Final
Norway (Loen)	2
Switzerland (Attinger)	6

Team	Final
France (Duclos)	3
Germany (Räderer)	7

Team	Final
Denmark (Pedersen)	8
Italy (Ghezze)	7

Team	Final
Scotland (Waddell)	3
Sweden (Ullsten)	8

=== Draw 5 ===
Team	Final
Denmark (Pedersen)	4
France (Duclos)	5

Team	Final
Canada (Gervais)	3
Scotland (Waddell)	2

Team	Final
Norway (Loen)	8
Italy (Ghezze)	7

Team	Final
United States (Somerville)	4
Sweden (Ullsten)	5

Team	Final
Switzerland (Attinger)	6
Germany (Räderer)	4

=== Draw 6 ===
Team	Final
Canada (Gervais)	3
Switzerland (Attinger)	5

Team	Final
Italy (Ghezze)	2
Sweden (Ullsten)	9

Team	Final
Denmark (Pedersen)	4
Scotland (Waddell)	3

Team	Final
Norway (Loen)	7
Germany (Räderer)	5

Team	Final
United States (Somerville)	12
France (Duclos)	2

=== Draw 7 ===
Team	Final
France (Duclos)	7
Sweden (Ullsten)	5

Team	Final
Scotland (Waddell)	3
Germany (Räderer)	5

Team	Final
United States (Somerville)	4
Switzerland (Attinger)	5

Team	Final
Canada (Gervais)	8
Italy (Ghezze)	4

Team	Final
Denmark (Pedersen)	5
Norway (Loen)	4

=== Draw 8 ===
Team	Final
Switzerland (Attinger)	13
Scotland (Waddell)	5

Team	Final
Norway (Loen)	7
France (Duclos)	12

Team	Final
Canada (Gervais)	5
Sweden (Ullsten)	2

Team	Final
Denmark (Pedersen)	7
Germany (Räderer)	6

Team	Final
United States (Somerville)	9
Italy (Ghezze)	2

=== Draw 9 ===
Team	Final
Norway (Loen)	3
Sweden (Ullsten)	4

Team	Final
Denmark (Pedersen)	5
Switzerland (Attinger)	11

Team	Final
France (Duclos)	13
Italy (Ghezze)	8

Team	Final
United States (Somerville)	8
Scotland (Waddell)	2

Team	Final
Canada (Gervais)	7
Germany (Räderer)	1

== Playoffs ==
Semifinals
1	Switzerland	2
4	United States	3
2	Canada	7
3	Sweden	8

Final
3	Sweden	4
4	United States	11

=== Semifinals ===
Sheet B	1	2	3	4	5	6	7	8	9	10	11	12	Final
Switzerland (Attinger)	0	0	0	1	0	0	0	1	0	0	0	0	2
United States (Somerville)	0	0	1	0	0	0	0	0	1	0	0	1	3

Sheet D	1	2	3	4	5	6	7	8	9	10	Final
Sweden (Ullsten)	0	1	1	0	2	0	2	0	0	2	8
Canada (Gervais)	1	0	0	1	0	3	0	0	2	0	7

=== Final ===
Team	Final
United States (Somerville)	11
Sweden (Ullsten)	4

1974 Air Canada Silver Broom
(United States)
United States
2nd title
