= 1978 Air Canada Silver Broom =

- Host city: Winnipeg, Manitoba, Canada
- Arena: Winnipeg Arena
- Dates: March 27 – April 2, 1978
- Winner: United States
- Curling club: Superior CC, Wisconsin
- Skip: Bob Nichols
- Third: Bill Strum
- Second: Tom Locken
- Lead: Bob Christman
- Finalist: Norway (Kristian Sørum)

The 1978 Air Canada Silver Broom, the men's world curling championship, was held from March 27 to April 2 at the Winnipeg Arena in Winnipeg, Manitoba, Canada.

== Teams ==
Canada	Denmark	France	Germany	Italy
Medicine Hat CC, Medicine Hat, Alberta Fourth: Ed Lukowich; Skip: Mike Chernoff; Second: Dale Johnston; Lead: Ron Schindle	Hvidovre CC, Hvidovre Skip: Arvid Petersen; Third: Arne Pedersen; Second: John Christiansen; Lead: Erik Kelnaes	Mont d'Arbois CC, Megève Skip: Pierre Boan; Third: Pierre Duclos; Second: Honore Brangi; Lead: Jean-Claude Gachet	Munchener EV, Munich Skip: Keith Wendorf; Third: Balint von Bery; Second: Sascha Fischer-Weppler; Lead: Heino von L'Estocq	66 CC, Cortina d'Ampezzo Skip: Leone Rezzadore; Third: Roberto Zangara; Second: Franco Caldara; Lead: Roberto Bocus
Norway	Scotland	Sweden	Switzerland	United States
Trondheim CC Skip: Kristian Sørum; Third: Morten Sørum; Second: Eigil Ramsfjell; Lead: Gunnar Meland	Oxenfoord CC, Edinburgh Skip: James Sanderson; Third: Iain Baxter; Second: Willie Sanderson; Lead: Colin Baxter	Djursholms CK, Stockholm Skip: Tom Schaeffer; Third: Svante Ödman; Second: Fred Ridderstad; Lead: Claes-Göran Carlman	Bern-Zähringer CC, Bern Skip: Fred Collioud; Third: Roland Schneider; Second: René Collioud; Lead: Kurt Schneider	Superior CC, Wisconsin Skip: Bob Nichols; Third: Bill Strum; Second: Tom Locken; Lead: Bob Christman

== Round-robin standings ==
Key
Teams to playoffs
Teams to tiebreaker

Country	Skip	W	L
Canada	Mike Chernoff	7	2
United States	Bob Nichols	7	2
Sweden	Tom Schaeffer	6	3
Norway	Kristian Sørum	5	4
Scotland	James Sanderson	5	4
Germany	Keith Wendorf	4	5
France	Pierre Boan	3	6
Italy	Leone Rezzadore	3	6
Switzerland	Fred Collioud	3	6
Denmark	Arvid Petersen	2	7

== Round-robin results ==
=== Draw 1 ===
Team	Final
Canada (Chernoff)	14
Norway (Sørum)	3

Team	Final
Germany (Wendorf)	8
France (Boan)	4

Team	Final
Sweden (Schaeffer)	10
Switzerland (Collioud)	4

Team	Final
United States (Nichols)	5
Scotland (Sanderson)	4

Team	Final
Italy (Rezzadore)	9
Denmark (Petersen)	4

=== Draw 2 ===
Team	Final
Sweden (Schaeffer)	8
Denmark (Petersen)	3

Team	Final
Norway (Sørum)	3
United States (Nichols)	9

Team	Final
France (Boan)	6
Italy (Rezzadore)	5

Team	Final
Switzerland (Collioud)	6
Canada (Chernoff)	3

Team	Final
Scotland (Sanderson)	4
Germany (Wendorf)	7

=== Draw 3 ===
Team	Final
Scotland (Sanderson)	5
Italy (Rezzadore)	3

Team	Final
Denmark (Petersen)	5
Canada (Chernoff)	11

Team	Final
Germany (Wendorf)	6
Norway (Sørum)	7

Team	Final
Sweden (Schaeffer)	11
France (Boan)	4

Team	Final
United States (Nichols)	5
Switzerland (Collioud)	4

=== Draw 4 ===
Team	Final
United States (Nichols)	7
France (Boan)	5

Team	Final
Italy (Rezzadore)	8
Switzerland (Collioud)	3

Team	Final
Canada (Chernoff)	4
Scotland (Sanderson)	6

Team	Final
Denmark (Petersen)	7
Germany (Wendorf)	5

Team	Final
Norway (Sørum)	7
Sweden (Schaeffer)	8

=== Draw 5 ===
Team	Final
Denmark (Petersen)	5
Scotland (Sanderson)	8

Team	Final
Canada (Chernoff)	9
Germany (Wendorf)	3

Team	Final
United States (Nichols)	7
Sweden (Schaeffer)	9

Team	Final
Norway (Sørum)	11
Italy (Rezzadore)	3

Team	Final
Switzerland (Collioud)	8
France (Boan)	7

=== Draw 6 ===
Team	Final
Norway (Sørum)	9
Switzerland (Collioud)	6

Team	Final
France (Boan)	5
Denmark (Petersen)	7

Team	Final
Italy (Rezzadore)	3
Germany (Wendorf)	12

Team	Final
Canada (Chernoff)	8
United States (Nichols)	6

Team	Final
Sweden (Schaeffer)	4
Scotland (Sanderson)	10

=== Draw 7 ===
Team	Final
France (Boan)	6
Canada (Chernoff)	8

Team	Final
Scotland (Sanderson)	6
Norway (Sørum)	7

Team	Final
Switzerland (Collioud)	7
Denmark (Petersen)	5

Team	Final
Italy (Rezzadore)	5
Sweden (Schaeffer)	3

Team	Final
Germany (Wendorf)	4
United States (Nichols)	7

=== Draw 8 ===
Team	Final
Italy (Rezzadore)	3
United States (Nichols)	5

Team	Final
Sweden (Schaeffer)	5
Canada (Chernoff)	8

Team	Final
Scotland (Sanderson)	2
France (Boan)	6

Team	Final
Germany (Wendorf)	7
Switzerland (Collioud)	2

Team	Final
Denmark (Petersen)	3
Norway (Sørum)	8

=== Draw 9 ===
Team	Final
Germany (Wendorf)	3
Sweden (Schaeffer)	8

Team	Final
Switzerland (Collioud)	3
Scotland (Sanderson)	10

Team	Final
Denmark (Petersen)	4
United States (Nichols)	6

Team	Final
France (Boan)	5
Norway (Sørum)	4

Team	Final
Canada (Chernoff)	9
Italy (Rezzadore)	2

== Tiebreaker ==
Team	Final
Norway (Sørum)	4
Scotland (Sanderson)	1

== Playoffs ==
Semifinals
1	Canada	2
4	Norway	6
2	United States	6
3	Sweden	5

Final
4	Norway	4
2	United States	6

=== Semifinals ===
Team	Final
Canada (Chernoff)	2
Norway (Sørum)	6

Team	Final
United States (Nichols)	6
Sweden (Schaeffer)	5

=== Final ===
Team	Final
United States (Nichols)	6
Norway (Sørum)	4

1978 Air Canada Silver Broom
(United States)
United States
4th title
