= Bud Somerville =

American curler (1937–2023)

- Curler
- Born: Raymond Hugh Somerville; January 27, 1937; Superior, Wisconsin, U.S.
- Died: October 13, 2023 (aged 86); Duluth, Minnesota, U.S.

Curling career
- World Championship: 6 (1965, 1968, 1969, 1974, 1981, 1995)
- Olympic: 2 (1988, 1992)
Medal record
Men's curling
Representing United States
Winter Olympics
Bronze medal – third place	1992 Albertville (Demonstration)
World Men's Championship
Gold medal – first place	1965 Perth
Gold medal – first place	1974 Bern
Silver medal – second place	1969 Perth
Silver medal – second place	1981 London
Bronze medal – third place	1968 Quebec

Raymond Hugh "Bud" Somerville (January 27, 1937 – October 13, 2023) was an American curler. He was a two-time World champion (1965, 1974), five time American champion (1965, 1968, 1969, 1974, 1981), and 14 time Wisconsin state champion (1962, 1963, 1965, 1966, 1968, 1969, 1974, 1975, 1976, 1977, 1979, 1981, 1983, 1984).

Somerville was born in Superior, Wisconsin to Raymond W. Somerville and Fern Somerville (née Berg). He attended Superior Central High School.

== Curling career ==
Somerville began curling at the age of 11, having been taught the game by his parents. He spent some of his first years curling playing for his father Ray's team.

Somerville won his first American championship in 1965, qualifying his team for the 1965 Scotch Cup, the World Curling championships at the time. His team won the event, defeating Canada's Terry Braunstein in the final, making Somerville the first skip from outside of Canada to win a World championship.

In 1968, Somerville won his second U.S. championship. At the 1968 Air Canada Silver Broom (the world championship), Somerville won the bronze medal after losing to Canada's Ron Northcott, 12–2 in the semi-final. The following year, Somerville won his third U.S. championship, and at the 1969 Air Canada Silver Broom, he lost once again to Canada's Northcott, this time in the final, 9–6.

In 1974, Somerville won his fourth U.S. championship. At the 1974 Air Canada Silver Broom, Somerville claimed his second and last World Championship, defeating Sweden's Jan Ullsten 11–4 in the final.

Somerville won his last U.S. championship in 1981. He once again won a medal at the 1981 Air Canada Silver Broom. He won a silver after losing to Switzerland's Jürg Tanner, 2–1 in the final.

Somerville also played in the 1988 and 1992 Winter Olympics, when curling was a demonstration sport. He finished in fourth place in 1988, and won a bronze medal in 1992. 1995 would mark his last World Championship appearance, when he was alternate for his son Tim's team.

Somerville was the first inductee to the United States Curling Hall of Fame in 1984.

== Personal life and death ==
Bud Somerville died at a hospital in Duluth, Minnesota on October 13, 2023, at the age of 86.

Somerville was married to Nancy, and had three children. One of his children, Tim, is also an American champion, having won the U.S. nationals in 1995, 1996 and 1999. Bud Somerville worked as a commercial printer for the Superior Evening Telegram's print shop, as well as served on the Douglas County Board, and as the Douglas County clerk.
