= World Curling Championships =

Annual world championships in curling

- Sport: Curling
- Founded: 1959 (men); 1979 (women); 2002 (wheelchair mixed); 2008 (mixed doubles); 2015 (mixed); 2022 (wheelchair mixed doubles)
- No. of teams: 18 (men & women); 12 (wheelchair mixed); 20 (mixed doubles)
- Most recent champions: Sweden (men); Switzerland (women); China (wheelchair mixed); Australia (mixed doubles); Sweden (mixed); Japan (wheelchair mixed doubles)
- Most titles: Canada (men: 36); Canada (women: 19); Switzerland (mixed doubles: 7); China & Norway & Russia (wheelchair mixed: 4); Canada (mixed: 3)

The World Curling Championships are the annual world championships for curling, organized by the World Curling Federation and contested by national championship teams. There are men's, women's and mixed doubles championships, as well as men's and women's versions of junior and senior championships. There is also a world championship for wheelchair curling. The men's championship started in 1959, while the women's started in 1979. The mixed doubles championship was started in 2008. Since 2005, the men's and women's championships have been held in different venues, with Canada hosting one of the two championships every year: the men's championship in odd years, and the women's championship in even years. Canada has dominated both the men's and women's championships since their inception, although Switzerland, Sweden, Denmark, Germany (West Germany), Scotland, the United States, Norway and China have all won at least one championship.

== History ==
The World Curling Championships began in 1959 as the Scotch Cup. The Scotch Cup was created by Toronto public relations executive and former sports journalist Stanley D. Houston on behalf of the Scotch Whisky Association, a client of Houston's agency Public Relations Services Limited, which was looking to generate increased North American exposure for its products. The first three Cups were contested between men's teams from Scotland and Canada. The United States joined the Scotch Cup in 1961, and Sweden also joined the next year. Canada won the first six world titles, of which the legendary rink skipped by Ernie Richardson earned four. The United States was the first country to break Canada's streak, winning their first world title in 1965. By 1967, Norway, Switzerland, France, and Germany were added to the Scotch Cup, and Scotland won their first title, while Canada finished without a medal for the first time. The tournament was renamed the Air Canada Silver Broom the year after that, and Canada strung together five consecutive world titles starting in that year.

In 1973, the competing field was expanded to ten teams, and Italy and Denmark were introduced to the world stage. Sweden, Switzerland, and Norway won their first titles in the following years, and Canada continued to win medals of all colours. In 1979, the first edition of the women's World Curling Championships was held. The championships were held separately from the men's championships for the first ten years. During this time, Switzerland, Canada, Sweden, Denmark, and Germany won world titles.

Bronze medals were not awarded until 1985 for the women's tournament and 1986 for the men's tournament. Between 1989 and 1994, the bronze medal was shared by the semifinals losers.

Beginning in 1989, the men's and women's championships were held together. Norway won their first world women's title. In 1995, Ford Canada and the World Curling Federation reached an agreement to make Ford the sponsor of the World Curling Championships. Japan, the first nation from Asia to compete in the worlds, made their debut in 1990 at the women's championship, and later in 2000 at the men's championship. South Korea and China followed suit in the 2000s. Scotland won their first women's title in 2002, and the United States won their first women's title the next year. In 2002, a world championship for wheelchair curling was also introduced.

In 2005, the men's and women's championships were separated, and an agreement was made between the World Curling Federation and the Canadian Curling Association that Canada would host one of the tournaments annually each year, all of which are title sponsored by Ford of Canada. Canada began a streak of top two finishes in the men's tournament, and China won their first world title in the women's tournament in 2009.

In 2008, a world championship for mixed doubles curling was created. Switzerland won the first world mixed doubles title, and proceeded to win four of the first five titles. Russia and Hungary won their first world curling titles in the mixed doubles championship, and New Zealand, France, Austria, and the Czech Republic won their first world curling medals.

In 2015, a world championship for mixed curling was created, replacing the European Mixed Curling Championship and supplanting the European Mixed and Canadian Mixed curling championships as the highest level of mixed curling in the world.

In 2019, the World Qualification Event was introduced, to qualify the final two teams in the men's and women's championships. A mixed doubles qualification event was added in the 2019–20 curling season, qualifying the final four teams of the twenty-team mixed doubles championship.

In 2020, the men's, women's and mixed doubles championships were cancelled due to the COVID-19 pandemic.

In 2022, the world championships were further expanded to include wheelchair mixed doubles.

=== Tournament names ===
The World Curling Championships have been known by a number of different names over the years.

Men

- 1959–1967: Scotch Cup
- 1968–1985: Air Canada Silver Broom
- 1986–1988: IOC President's Cup (Hexagon)
- 1989–1990: WCF Championships
- 1991–1992: Canada Safeway World Curling Championship
- 1993–1994: WCF Championships
- 1995–2004: Ford World Curling Championship
- 2005–2017: Ford World Men's Curling Championship (odd years)
- 2006–2018: World Men's Curling Championship (even years)
- 2019: Pioneer Hi-Bred World Men's Curling Championship
- 2020–present: LGT World Men's Curling Championship (even years)
- 2021–present: BKT Tires & OK Tire World Men's Curling Championship (odd years)

Women

- 1979–1981: Royal Bank of Scotland World Curling Championships
- 1982: World Curling Championships
- 1983: Pioneer Life World Curling Championships
- 1984: World Curling Championships
- 1985: H&M World Curling Championships
- 1986–1990: World Curling Championships
- 1991–1992: Canada Safeway World Curling Championships
- 1993–1994: World Curling Championships
- 1995–2004: Ford World Curling Championships
- 2005–2017: World Women's Curling Championship (odd years)
- 2006–2018: Ford World Women's Curling Championship (even years)
- 2019–present: LGT World Women's Curling Championship (odd years)
- 2022–present: BKT Tires & OK Tire World Women's Curling Championship (even years)

== Competition format ==
=== Men's and Women's ===
The first two world championships, held as competitions between Scotland and Canada, were held as five-game series between the two nations. Upon the addition of the United States in 1961, the format was changed to a double round robin preliminary round with a three-team knockout round at the conclusion of the round robin. The knockout round was removed for the next two championships. With the addition of more teams, a single round robin preliminary round with a four-team knockout round was implemented in 1971. The championships occurring from 1968 to 1970 included three-team knockout rounds instead of four-team knockout rounds. The knockout round format was adjusted from single-elimination to the Page playoff system in 2005.

In the championships held from 1971 to 1985, third place was awarded to either the team that lost in the semifinal of a three-team knockout round or the higher-seeded team among the losing teams of a four-team knockout round. A bronze medal game was added to the knockout round in 1986, but bronze medal games were not held from 1989 to 1994, during which bronze medals were awarded to the teams that lost in the semifinals.

Until 2017 format of the world championships used a twelve team round-robin preliminary round, after which the top four teams advance to a knockout round held using the Page playoff system.

Starting in 2018 there are 13 teams playing round-robin preliminary round with top six advancing to a single-elimination knockout with top two receiving bye to the semifinals. This includes two teams from the Americas zone, eight from the European zone (via the European Curling Championships) and three from the Asia-Pacific zone (via the Pacific-Asia Curling Championships). For 2019, the number of teams from the Asia-Pacific zone will be reduced by one, and there will also be one less team from the zone of the bottom-placed team at the 2018 championships. The two slots will be allocated to teams from the new World Qualification Event. The qualification event will have eight teams: the host country, one team from the Americas, two from Pacific-Asia, and four from Europe.

In 2022, qualification for the world championships were changed. A new event, the Pan Continental Curling Championships, were created to qualify teams from the America and Pacific-Asia zones for the World Curling Championships, with the top five teams earning qualification. The championship was created to combine the Pacific-Asia Curling Championships and the Americas into one event, and create a stronger continental competition to mirror the established European Curling Championships.

Starting in the 2026–27 curling season, World Curling announced they will now be implementing World Curling Championship B and C Divisions, which serves as the new qualification method for men's and women's teams to the World Championships. There will also be an expansion from 13 teams to 18 teams, with two pools of nine teams. After round-robin play, the pool winners progress directly to the semi-finals and the second and third placed teams from each pool will play crossover qualification games for the remaining semi-final spots. The top 14 teams from each championship will retain their place for the following season, while the bottom four teams will be relegated to the B-Division for the next season.

=== Mixed Doubles ===
From its creation in 2008 until 2019 the championship was open entry, meaning that any World Curling member could send a team. With the popularity of curling, and specifically mixed doubles, growing this policy of open entry led to 48 teams participating in the 2019 championship, the final year of open entry.

Beginning in 2020 the championship was limited to 20 teams, the top sixteen countries from the previous championship and four countries from a newly created qualification event. Called the World Mixed Doubles Qualification Event, the inaugural tournament was held in December 2019 in Howwood, Scotland. This qualification tournament is open to any member not already qualified for the championship.

The format of the mixed doubles championship is an adapted version of the men's and women's championships. The 20 teams are split into two pools of 10 teams and play a preliminary round-robin against those in their pool. The top three teams in each pool advance to a single-elimination knockout with the top two teams in each pool receiving a bye to the semifinals.

=== Wheelchair ===
Starting in 2018, the world wheelchair curling championships follow a similar format to the men's and women's championships. The top 12 teams (either qualifying through finishing in the top 8 the previous year, or qualifying through the B Division) play a round-robin preliminary round with top six advancing to a single-elimination knockout with top two receiving bye to the semifinals.

=== Wheelchair mixed doubles ===
The event began in 2022, remaining as an open entry event for any country to participate. The format of the championship is that teams are split into pools and play a preliminary round-robin against those in their pool. The top eight teams overall after round-robin play advance to a single-elimination knockout.

== Championships ==
=== Men ===
Year	Location	Gold	Silver	Bronze	4th place
1959	(Scotland) Edinburgh, Falkirk, Perth	Canada	Scotland	no other competitors	
1960	(Scotland) Ayr, Edinburgh, Glasgow	Canada (2)	Scotland	no other competitors	
1961	(Scotland) Ayr, Edinburgh, Kirkcaldy, Perth	Canada (3)	Scotland	United States	no other competitors
1962	(Scotland) Edinburgh, Falkirk	Canada (4)	United States	Scotland	Sweden
1963	(Scotland) Perth	Canada (5)	Scotland	United States	Sweden
1964	(Canada) Calgary	Canada (6)	Scotland	United States	Sweden
1965	(Scotland) Perth	United States	Canada	Sweden	Scotland
1966	(Canada) Vancouver	Canada (7)	Scotland	United States	Sweden
1967	(Scotland) Perth	Scotland	Sweden	United States	Canada
1968	(Canada) Pointe-Claire	Canada (8)	Scotland	United States	Sweden
1969	(Scotland) Perth	Canada (9)	United States	Scotland	Sweden
1970	(United States) Utica	Canada (10)	Scotland	Sweden	United States
1971	(France) Megève	Canada (11)	Scotland	United States	Switzerland
1972	(West Germany) Garmisch-Partenkirchen	Canada (12)	United States	West Germany	Scotland
1973	(Canada) Regina	Sweden	Canada	France	Scotland
1974	(Switzerland) Bern	United States (2)	Sweden	Switzerland	Canada
1975	(Scotland) Perth	Switzerland	United States	Canada	Sweden
1976	(United States) Duluth	United States (3)	Scotland	Switzerland	Sweden
1977	(Sweden) Karlstad	Sweden (2)	Canada	Scotland	United States
1978	(Canada) Winnipeg	United States (4)	Norway	Canada	Sweden
1979	(Switzerland) Bern	Norway	Switzerland	Canada	West Germany
1980	(Canada) Moncton	Canada (13)	Norway	Switzerland	Sweden
1981	(Canada) London	Switzerland (2)	United States	Canada	Norway
1982	(West Germany) Garmisch-Partenkirchen	Canada (14)	Switzerland	West Germany	Sweden
1983	(Canada) Regina	Canada (15)	West Germany	Norway	Sweden
1984	(United States) Duluth	Norway (2)	Switzerland	Sweden	Canada
1985	(Scotland) Glasgow	Canada (16)	Sweden	Denmark	United States
1986	(Canada) Toronto	Canada (17)	Scotland	United States	Sweden
1987	(Canada) Vancouver	Canada (18)	West Germany	Norway	Denmark
1988	(Switzerland) Lausanne	Norway (3)	Canada	Scotland	Switzerland
1989	(United States) Milwaukee	Canada (19)	Switzerland	Norway; Sweden	
1990	(Sweden) Västerås	Canada (20)	Scotland	Denmark; Sweden	
1991	(Canada) Winnipeg	Scotland (2)	Canada	Norway; United States	
1992	(Germany) Garmisch-Partenkirchen	Switzerland (3)	Scotland	Canada; United States	
1993	(Switzerland) Geneva	Canada (21)	Scotland	Switzerland; United States	
1994	(Germany) Oberstdorf	Canada (22)	Sweden	Germany; Switzerland	
1995	(Canada) Brandon	Canada (23)	Scotland	Germany	United States
1996	(Canada) Hamilton	Canada (24)	Scotland	Switzerland	Norway
1997	(Switzerland) Bern	Sweden (3)	Germany	Scotland	Canada
1998	(Canada) Kamloops	Canada (25)	Sweden	Finland	Scotland
1999	(Canada) Saint John	Scotland (3)	Canada	Switzerland	United States
2000	(Scotland) Glasgow	Canada (26)	Sweden	Finland	United States
2001	(Switzerland) Lausanne	Sweden (4)	Switzerland	Norway	Canada
2002	(United States) Bismarck	Canada (27)	Norway	Scotland	United States
2003	(Canada) Winnipeg	Canada (28)	Switzerland	Norway	Finland
2004	(Sweden) Gävle	Sweden (5)	Germany	Canada	Norway
2005	(Canada) Victoria	Canada (29)	Scotland	Germany	Norway
2006	(United States) Lowell	Scotland (4)	Canada	Norway	United States
2007	(Canada) Edmonton	Canada (30)	Germany	United States	Switzerland
2008	(United States) Grand Forks	Canada (31)	Scotland	Norway	China
2009	(Canada) Moncton	Scotland (5)	Canada	Norway	Switzerland
2010	(Italy) Cortina d'Ampezzo	Canada (32)	Norway	Scotland	United States
2011	(Canada) Regina	Canada (33)	Scotland	Sweden	Norway
2012	(Switzerland) Basel	Canada (34)	Scotland	Sweden	Norway
2013	(Canada) Victoria	Sweden (6)	Canada	Scotland	Denmark
2014	(China) Beijing	Norway (4)	Sweden	Switzerland	Canada
2015	(Canada) Halifax	Sweden (7)	Norway	Canada	Finland
2016	(Switzerland) Basel	Canada (35)	Denmark	United States	Japan
2017	(Canada) Edmonton	Canada (36)	Sweden	Switzerland	United States
2018	(United States) Paradise	Sweden (8)	Canada	Scotland	South Korea
2019	(Canada) Lethbridge	Sweden (9)	Canada	Switzerland	Japan
2020	(Scotland) Glasgow	Cancelled			
2021	(Canada) Calgary	Sweden (10)	Scotland	Switzerland	RCF
2022	(United States) Paradise	Sweden (11)	Canada	Italy	United States
2023	(Canada) Ottawa	Scotland (6)	Canada	Switzerland	Italy
2024	(Switzerland) Schaffhausen	Sweden (12)	Canada	Italy	Scotland
2025	(Canada) Moose Jaw	Scotland (7)	Switzerland	Canada	China
2026	(United States) Ogden	Sweden (13)	Canada	Scotland	United States
2027	(Canada) Saint John				

=== Women ===
Year	Location	Gold	Silver	Bronze	4th place
1979	(Scotland) Perth	Switzerland	Sweden	Canada; Scotland	
1980	(Scotland) Perth	Canada	Sweden	Scotland	United States
1981	(Scotland) Perth	Sweden	Canada	Norway	Switzerland
1982	(Switzerland) Geneva	Denmark	Sweden	Scotland	Norway
1983	(Canada) Moose Jaw	Switzerland (2)	Norway	Canada	Sweden
1984	(Scotland) Perth	Canada (2)	Switzerland	West Germany	Norway
1985	(Sweden) Jönköping	Canada (3)	Scotland	Switzerland	Sweden
1986	(Canada) Kelowna	Canada (4)	West Germany	Sweden	Scotland
1987	(United States) Chicago	Canada (5)	West Germany	Switzerland	Norway
1988	(Scotland) Glasgow	West Germany	Canada	Sweden	Norway
1989	(United States) Milwaukee	Canada (6)	Norway	Sweden; West Germany	
1990	(Sweden) Västerås	Norway	Scotland	Canada; Denmark	
1991	(Canada) Winnipeg	Norway (2)	Canada	Scotland; Sweden	
1992	(Germany) Garmisch-Partenkirchen	Sweden (2)	United States	Canada; Switzerland	
1993	(Switzerland) Geneva	Canada (7)	Germany	Norway; Sweden	
1994	(Germany) Oberstdorf	Canada (8)	Scotland	Germany; Sweden	
1995	(Canada) Brandon	Sweden (3)	Canada	Norway	Germany
1996	(Canada) Hamilton	Canada (9)	United States	Norway	Germany
1997	(Switzerland) Bern	Canada (10)	Norway	Denmark	Japan
1998	(Canada) Kamloops	Sweden (4)	Denmark	Canada	Norway
1999	(Canada) Saint John	Sweden (5)	United States	Denmark	Norway
2000	(Scotland) Glasgow	Canada (11)	Switzerland	Norway	Scotland
2001	(Switzerland) Lausanne	Canada (12)	Sweden	Denmark	Scotland
2002	(United States) Bismarck	Scotland	Sweden	Norway	Canada
2003	(Canada) Winnipeg	United States	Canada	Sweden	Norway
2004	(Sweden) Gävle	Canada (13)	Norway	Switzerland	United States
2005	(Scotland) Paisley	Sweden (6)	United States	Norway	Canada
2006	(Canada) Grande Prairie	Sweden (7)	United States	Canada	Germany
2007	(Japan) Aomori	Canada (14)	Denmark	Scotland	United States
2008	(Canada) Vernon	Canada (15)	China	Switzerland	Japan
2009	(South Korea) Gangneung	China	Sweden	Denmark	Canada
2010	(Canada) Swift Current	Germany (2)	Scotland	Canada	Sweden
2011	(Denmark) Esbjerg	Sweden (8)	Canada	China	Denmark
2012	(Canada) Lethbridge	Switzerland (3)	Sweden	Canada	South Korea
2013	(Latvia) Riga	Scotland (2)	Sweden	Canada	United States
2014	(Canada) Saint John	Switzerland (4)	Canada	Russia	South Korea
2015	(Japan) Sapporo	Switzerland (5)	Canada	Russia	Scotland
2016	(Canada) Swift Current	Switzerland (6)	Japan	Russia	Canada
2017	(China) Beijing	Canada (16)	Russia	Scotland	Sweden
2018	(Canada) North Bay	Canada (17)	Sweden	Russia	United States
2019	(Denmark) Silkeborg	Switzerland (7)	Sweden	South Korea	Japan
2020	(Canada) Prince George	Cancelled			
2021	(Canada) Calgary	Switzerland (8)	RCF	United States	Sweden
2022	(Canada) Prince George	Switzerland (9)	South Korea	Canada	Sweden
2023	(Sweden) Sandviken	Switzerland (10)	Norway	Canada	Sweden
2024	(Canada) Sydney	Canada (18)	Switzerland	South Korea	Italy
2025	(South Korea) Uijeongbu	Canada (19)	Switzerland	China	South Korea
2026	(Canada) Calgary	Switzerland (11)	Canada	Sweden	Japan
2027	TBA				
2028	(Canada) Truro				

=== Mixed ===
Year	Location	Gold	Silver	Bronze	4th place
2015	(Switzerland) Bern	Norway	Sweden	China	Russia
2016	(Russia) Kazan	Russia	Sweden	Scotland	South Korea
2017	(Switzerland) Champéry	Scotland	Canada	Czech Republic	Norway
2018	(Canada) Kelowna	Canada	Spain	Russia	Norway
2019	(Scotland) Aberdeen	Canada (2)	Germany	Norway	South Korea
2020	(Scotland) Aberdeen	Cancelled			
2021	(Scotland) Aberdeen	Cancelled			
2022	(Scotland) Aberdeen	Canada (3)	Scotland	Switzerland	Sweden
2023	(Scotland) Aberdeen	Sweden	Spain	Canada	Norway
2024	(Scotland) Aberdeen	Sweden (2)	Japan	Switzerland	Spain
2027 (Apr.)	(Canada) Penticton				
2027 (Oct.)	(Canada) Vernon				
2029	(Canada) Vernon				

=== Mixed doubles ===
Year	Location	Gold	Silver	Bronze	4th place
2008	(Finland) Vierumäki	Switzerland	Finland	Sweden	Norway
2009	(Italy) Cortina d'Ampezzo	Switzerland (2)	Hungary	Canada	China
2010	(Russia) Chelyabinsk	Russia	New Zealand	China	Spain
2011	(United States) Saint Paul	Switzerland (3)	Russia	France	Sweden
2012	(Turkey) Erzurum	Switzerland (4)	Sweden	Austria	United States
2013	(Canada) Fredericton	Hungary	Sweden	Czech Republic	Norway
2014	(Scotland) Dumfries	Switzerland (5)	Sweden	Spain	Hungary
2015	(Russia) Sochi	Hungary (2)	Sweden	Norway	Canada
2016	(Sweden) Karlstad	Russia (2)	China	United States	Scotland
2017	(Canada) Lethbridge	Switzerland (6)	Canada	China	Czech Republic
2018	(Sweden) Östersund	Switzerland (7)	Russia	Canada	South Korea
2019	(Norway) Stavanger	Sweden	Canada	United States	Australia
2020	(Canada) Kelowna	Cancelled			
2021	(Scotland) Aberdeen	Scotland	Norway	Sweden	Canada
2022	(Switzerland) Geneva	Scotland (2)	Switzerland	Germany	Norway
2023	(South Korea) Gangneung	United States	Japan	Norway	Canada
2024	(Sweden) Östersund	Sweden (2)	Estonia	Norway	Switzerland
2025	(Canada) Fredericton	Italy	Scotland	Australia	Estonia
2026	(Switzerland) Geneva	Australia	Sweden	Canada	Italy
2027	(Finland) Lohja				
2028	(Canada) Olds				

=== Wheelchair mixed team ===
Year	Location	Gold	Silver	Bronze	4th place
2002	(Switzerland) Sursee	Switzerland	Canada	Scotland	Sweden
2004	(Switzerland) Sursee	Scotland	Switzerland	Canada	England
2005	(Scotland) Braehead	Scotland (2)	Denmark	Switzerland	Sweden
2007	(Sweden) Sollefteå	Norway	Switzerland	Scotland	Canada
2008	(Switzerland) Sursee	Norway (2)	South Korea	United States	Canada
2009	(Canada) Vancouver	Canada	Sweden	Germany	United States
2011	(Czech Republic) Prague	Canada (2)	Scotland	Norway	Russia
2012	(South Korea) Chuncheon	Russia	South Korea	China	Slovakia
2013	(Russia) Sochi	Canada (3)	Sweden	China	United States
2015	(Finland) Lohja	Russia (2)	China	Finland	Slovakia
2016	(Switzerland) Lucerne	Russia (3)	Norway	South Korea	Switzerland
2017	(South Korea) Gangneung	Norway (3)	Russia	Scotland	China
2019	(Scotland) Stirling	China	Scotland	South Korea	Norway
2020	(Switzerland) Wetzikon	Russia (4)	Canada	Sweden	China
2021	(China) Beijing	China (2)	Sweden	RCF	United States
2023	(Canada) Richmond	China (3)	Canada	Scotland	Sweden
2024	(South Korea) Gangneung	Norway (4)	Canada	China	Sweden
2025	(Scotland) Stevenston	China (4)	South Korea	Canada	Slovakia
2027	(Finland) Lohja				

=== Wheelchair mixed doubles ===
Year	Location	Gold	Silver	Bronze	4th place
2022	(Finland) Lohja	Sweden	Hungary	Norway	Italy
2023	(Canada) Richmond	Latvia	United States	Canada	China
2024	(South Korea) Gangneung	South Korea	China	Italy	Japan
2025	(Scotland) Stevenston	Japan	Scotland	Estonia	South Korea
2027	(Finland) Lohja				

== All-time medal table ==
As of 2026 World Mixed Doubles Curling Championship

Rank	Nation	Gold	Silver	Bronze	Total
1	Canada	61	31	26	118
2	Sweden	26	28	18	72
3	Switzerland	22	14	20	56
4	Scotland	14	30	21	65
5	Norway	11	12	22	45
6	Russia	7	5	6	18
7	United States	6	11	17	34
8	China	5	4	8	17
9	Germany	2	9	10	21
10	Hungary	2	2	0	4
11	Denmark	1	4	7	12
12	South Korea	1	4	4	9
13	Japan	1	3	0	4
14	Italy	1	0	3	4
15	Australia	1	0	1	2
16	Latvia	1	0	0	1
17	Spain	0	2	1	3
18	Finland	0	1	3	4
19	Estonia	0	1	1	2
20	New Zealand	0	1	0	1
21	Czech Republic	0	0	2	2
21	France	0	0	2	2
23	Austria	0	0	1	1
Totals (23 entries)		162	162	173	497

== Records ==
Overall medal records across olympic disciplines (male curler) (Note: Olympic discipline includes men's team, women's team and mixed doubles.)
Achievement	Curler	Country	Record	Years	
Achievement	Curler	Country	Record	Men's	Mixed doubles
Most titles	Oskar Eriksson	Sweden	9	2013, 2015, 2018–2019, 2021–2022, 2024, 2026	2019
Most finals	Oskar Eriksson	Sweden	11	2013–2015, 2017–2019, 2021–2022, 2024, 2026	2019
Most medals	Oskar Eriksson	Sweden	14	2011–2015, 2017–2019, 2021–2022, 2024, 2026	2019, 2021

Overall medal records across olympic disciplines (female curler)
Achievement	Curler	Country	Record	Years	
Achievement	Curler	Country	Record	Women's	Mixed doubles
Most titles	Alina Pätz	Switzerland	7	2012, 2015, 2019, 2021–2023	2011
Most finals	Alina Pätz	Switzerland	10	2012, 2015, 2019, 2021–2025	2011, 2022
Most medals	Dordi Nordby	Norway	11	1989–1991, 1993, 1995–1997, 2000, 2002, 2004–2005	—N/a

Overall medal records across paralympic disciplines (male curler) (Note: Paralympic discipline includes wheelchair mixed team and wheelchair mixed doubles.)
Achievement	Curler	Country	Record	Years	
Achievement	Curler	Country	Record	Mixed	Mixed doubles
Most titles	Jostein Stordahl	Norway	4	2007–2008, 2017, 2024	—N/a
Most titles	Wang Haitao	China	4	2019, 2021, 2023, 2025	—N/a
Most titles	Zhang Mingliang	China	4	2019, 2021, 2023, 2025	—N/a
Most finals	Jostein Stordahl	Norway	5	2007–2008, 2011, 2017, 2024	—N/a
Most finals	Wang Haitao	China	5	2015, 2019, 2021, 2023, 2025	—N/a
Most medals	Wang Haitao	China	8	2012–2013, 2015, 2019, 2021, 2023–2025	—N/a

Overall medal records across paralympic disciplines (female curler)
Achievement	Curler	Country	Record	Years	
Achievement	Curler	Country	Record	Mixed	Mixed doubles
Most titles	Ina Forrest	Canada	3	2009, 2011, 2013	—N/a
Most titles	Sonja Gaudet	Canada	3	2009, 2011, 2013	—N/a
Most titles	Svetlana Pakhomova	Russia	3	2012, 2015, 2016	—N/a
Most finals	Ina Forrest	Canada	6	2009, 2011, 2013, 2020, 2023–2024	—N/a
Most medals	Ina Forrest	Canada	6	2009, 2011, 2013, 2020, 2023–2024	—N/a

== National championships ==
=== Men ===
- (Canada) The Brier
- United States Men's Curling Championship
- (Scotland) Scottish Men's Curling Championship
- (France) French Men's Curling Championship
- (Russia) Russian Curling Championships
- (Italy) Italian Curling Championship
- (Finland) Finnish Men's Curling Championship
- (Denmark) Danish Men's Curling Championship
- (Switzerland) Swiss Men's Curling Championship
- New Zealand Men's Curling Championship
- (Sweden) Swedish Men's Curling Championship
- Japan Curling Championships
- (Latvia) Latvian Men's Curling Championship
- (Norway) Norwegian Men's Curling Championship
- (Estonia) Estonian Men's Curling Championship
- (Czech Republic) Czech Men's Curling Championship
- (South Korea) Korean Curling Championships

=== Women ===
- (Canada) Scotties Tournament of Hearts
- United States Women's Curling Championship
- (Scotland) Scottish Women's Curling Championship
- (France) French Women's Curling Championship
- (Russia) Russian Curling Championships
- (Italy) Italian Curling Championship
- (Finland) Finnish Women's Curling Championship
- (Denmark) Danish Women's Curling Championship
- (Switzerland) Swiss Women's Curling Championship
- (Sweden) Swedish Women's Curling Championship
- Japan Curling Championships
- (Latvia) Latvian Women's Curling Championship
- (Estonia) Estonian Women's Curling Championship
- (Czech Republic) Czech Women's Curling Championship
- (South Korea) Korean Curling Championships

== See also ==
- Curse of LaBonte
- World Junior Curling Championships
- World Senior Curling Championships
- European Curling Championships
- Pan Continental Curling Championships
- Pacific-Asia Curling Championships
- Americas Challenge
- World Qualification Event
- World Curling Tour
- Collie Campbell Memorial Award
- Frances Brodie Award
