= Henrik Holmberg =

Swedish male curler

- Curler ♂
- Born: 5 July 1963 (age 63)

Team
- Curling club: Karlstads CK, Karlstad, Sundsvalls CK, Sundsvall

Curling career
- Member Association: Sweden
- World Championship: 1 (1988)
- European Championship: 1 (1992)
- Other appearances: World Junior Championships: 2 (1982, 1983)
Medal record
Curling
European Championships
Silver medal – second place	1992 Perth
World Junior Championships
Gold medal – first place	1982 Fredericton
Swedish Men's Championship
Gold medal – first place	1982
Gold medal – first place	1992

Carl Henrik Lennart Holmberg (born 5 July 1963) is a Swedish curler.

He is a 1992 European Championships silver medallist, a two-time Swedish men's champion (1982, 1992) and a 1986 Swedisn mixed champion.

He was a member of team who won 1982 the Swedish men's championship and qualified for the 1982 Worlds, but Holmberg didn't compete because it was decided that he was too young to participate.

== Teams ==
=== Men's ===
Season	Skip	Third	Second	Lead	Alternate	Events
1981–82	Sören Grahn	Niclas Järund	Henrik Holmberg	Anders Svennerstedt		SJCC 1982 (gold); WJCC 1982 (gold)
1981–82	Connie Östlund	Tony Eng	Henrik Holmberg	Anders Svennerstedt		SMCC 1982 (gold)
1982–83	Sören Grahn	Niclas Järund	Henrik Holmberg	Anders Svennerstedt		SJCC 1983 (gold); WJCC 1983 (7th)
1987–88	Sören Grahn	Henrik Holmberg	Per Axelsson	Håkan Funk		WCC 1988 (5th)
1991–92	Per Carlsén	Henrik Holmberg	Tommy Olin	Stefan Larsson		SMCC 1992 (gold)
1992–93	Per Carlsén	Henrik Holmberg	Tommy Olin	Olle Håkansson	Mikael Norberg	ECC 1992 (silver)

=== Mixed ===
Season	Skip	Third	Second	Lead	Events
1986	Per Axelsson	Anna Klange	Henrik Holmberg	Helena Klange	SMxCC 1986 (gold)
