= 1999 World Men's Curling Championship =

- Host city: Saint John, New Brunswick
- Arena: Harbour Station
- Dates: April 3–11, 1999
- Attendance: 96,429 (combined men's and women's)
- Winner: Scotland
- Curling club: Inverness Curling Club
- Skip: Hammy McMillan
- Third: Warwick Smith
- Second: Ewan MacDonald
- Lead: Peter Loudon
- Alternate: Gordon Muirhead
- Finalist: Canada (Jeff Stoughton)

The 1999 World Men's Curling Championship (branded as 1999 Ford World Men's Curling Championship for sponsorship reasons) was held at Harbour Station in Saint John, New Brunswick from April 3–11, 1999.

== Teams ==
Canada	Denmark	Finland	Germany	New Zealand
Charleswood CC, Winnipeg, Manitoba Skip: Jeff Stoughton; Third: Jon Mead; Second: Garry Vandenberghe; Lead: Doug Armstrong; Alternate: Steve Gould	Hvidovre CC, Hvidovre Skip: Ulrik Schmidt; Third: Lasse Lavrsen; Second: Brian Hansen; Lead: Carsten Svensgaard; Alternate: Frants Gufler	Vierumäki CR, Vierumäki Skip: Markku Uusipaavalniemi; Third: Wille Mäkelä; Second: Tommi Häti; Lead: Jari Laukkanen; Alternate: Raimo Lind	Füssen CC, Füssen Skip: Andy Kapp; Third: Uli Kapp; Second: Oliver Axnick; Lead: Holger Höhne; Alternate: Sebastian Linkemann	Ranfurly CC, Ranfurly Skip: Sean Becker; Third: Hans Frauenlob; Second: Jim Allan; Lead: Lorne De Pape; Alternate: Darren Carson
Norway	Scotland	Sweden	Switzerland	United States
Stabekk CC, Oslo Skip: Pål Trulsen; Third: Lars Vågberg; Second: Flemming Davanger; Lead: Bent Ånund Ramsfjell; Alternate: Thomas Ulsrud	Inverness CC, Inverness Skip: Hammy McMillan; Third: Warwick Smith; Second: Ewan MacDonald; Lead: Peter Loudon; Alternate: Gordon Muirhead	Sundsvalls CK, Sundsvall Skip: Per Carlsén; Third: Mikael Norberg; Second: Tommy Olin; Lead: Niklas Berggren; Alternate: Jan Strandlund	Lausanne-Olympique CC, Lausanne Skip: Patrick Hürlimann; Third: Dominic Andres; Second: Martin Romang; Lead: Diego Perren; Alternate: Patrik Lörtscher	St. Paul CC, St. Paul Skip: Tim Somerville; Third: Don Barcome Jr. Second: Myles Brundidge; Lead: John Gordon; Alternate: Mark Haluptzok

== Round-robin standings ==
Key
Teams to playoffs
Teams to tiebreaker

Country	Skip	W	L
Canada	Jeff Stoughton	8	1
Scotland	Hammy McMillan	6	3
United States	Tim Somerville	6	3
Norway	Pål Trulsen	5	4
Switzerland	Patrick Hürlimann	5	4
Denmark	Ulrik Schmidt	5	4
Germany	Andy Kapp	4	5
Finland	Markku Uusipaavalniemi	4	5
Sweden	Per Carlsén	2	7
New Zealand	Sean Becker	0	9

== Round-robin results ==
=== Draw 1 ===
Sheet A	Final
Sweden (Carlsén)	4
Germany (Kapp)	10

Sheet B	Final
Denmark (Schmidt)	7
Scotland (McMillan)	3

Sheet C	Final
Norway (Trulsen)	9
Switzerland (Hürlimann)	6

Sheet D	Final
New Zealand (Becker)	5
United States (Somerville)	8

Sheet E	Final
Canada (Stoughton)	7
Finland (Uusipaavalniemi)	5

=== Draw 2 ===
Sheet A	Final
United States (Somerville)	4
Scotland (McMillan)	7

Sheet B	Final
Finland (Uusipaavalniemi)	10
Norway (Trulsen)	7

Sheet C	Final
Sweden (Carlsén)	6
Denmark (Schmidt)	7

Sheet D	Final
Switzerland (Hürlimann)	4
Canada (Stoughton)	9

Sheet E	Final
Germany (Kapp)	7
New Zealand (Becker)	6

=== Draw 3 ===
Sheet A	Final
Norway (Trulsen)	7
Sweden (Carlsén)	6

Sheet B	Final
Switzerland (Hürlimann)	10
New Zealand (Becker)	4

Sheet C	Final
Scotland (McMillan)	5
Canada (Stoughton)	6

Sheet D	Final
Finland (Uusipaavalniemi)	1
Germany (Kapp)	11

Sheet E	Final
Denmark (Schmidt)	6
United States (Somerville)	7

=== Draw 4 ===
Sheet A	Final
Germany (Kapp)	5
Denmark (Schmidt)	6

Sheet B	Final
Canada (Stoughton)	8
Sweden (Carlsén)	3

Sheet C	Final
United States (Somerville)	4
Finland (Uusipaavalniemi)	2

Sheet D	Final
Scotland (McMillan)	10
Switzerland (Hürlimann)	7

Sheet E	Final
New Zealand (Becker)	6
Norway (Trulsen)	10

=== Draw 5 ===
Sheet A	Final
Switzerland (Hürlimann)	8
Finland (Uusipaavalniemi)	5

Sheet B	Final
New Zealand (Becker)	3
Denmark (Schmidt)	0

Sheet C	Final
Canada (Stoughton)	9
Norway (Trulsen)	6

Sheet D	Final
United States (Somerville)	7
Sweden (Carlsén)	10

Sheet E	Final
Scotland (McMillan)	6
Germany (Kapp)	5

=== Draw 6 ===
Sheet A	Final
Canada (Stoughton)	7
United States (Somerville)	4

Sheet B	Final
Scotland (McMillan)	3
Finland (Uusipaavalniemi)	8

Sheet C	Final
New Zealand (Becker)	3
Sweden (Carlsén)	8

Sheet D	Final
Germany (Kapp)	4
Norway (Trulsen)	5

Sheet E	Final
Switzerland (Hürlimann)	6
Denmark (Schmidt)	5

=== Draw 7 ===
Sheet A	Final
Scotland (McMillan)	6
New Zealand (Becker)	5

Sheet B	Final
Norway (Trulsen)	7
United States (Somerville)	8

Sheet C	Final
Switzerland (Hürlimann)	5
Germany (Kapp)	4

Sheet D	Final
Canada (Stoughton)	11
Denmark (Schmidt)	4

Sheet E	Final
Finland (Uusipaavalniemi)	7
Sweden (Carlsén)	4

=== Draw 8 ===
Sheet A	Final
Denmark (Schmidt)	1
Norway (Trulsen)	9

Sheet B	Final
Germany (Kapp)	9
Canada (Stoughton)	4

Sheet C	Final
Finland (Uusipaavalniemi)	7
New Zealand (Becker)	4

Sheet D	Final
Sweden (Carlsén)	6
Scotland (McMillan)	8

Sheet E	Final
United States (Somerville)	11
Switzerland (Hürlimann)	4

=== Draw 9 ===
Sheet A	Final
New Zealand (Becker)	6
Canada (Stoughton)	7

Sheet B	Final
Sweden (Carlsén)	4
Switzerland (Hürlimann)	7

Sheet C	Final
Germany (Kapp)	5
United States (Somerville)	7

Sheet D	Final
Denmark (Schmidt)	6
Finland (Uusipaavalniemi)	5

Sheet E	Final
Norway (Trulsen)	3
Scotland (McMillan)	8

== Tiebreakers ==
Sheet A	Final
Switzerland (Hürlimann)	7
Denmark (Schmidt)	4

Sheet A	Final
Switzerland (Hürlimann)	5
Norway (Trulsen)	4

== Playoffs ==
=== Brackets ===
Semi-final
1	Canada	8
4	Switzerland	5
2	Scotland	6
3	United States	4

Final
1	Canada	5
2	Scotland	6
Bronze medal
3	United States	3
4	Switzerland	8

=== Final ===
In the final end, Hammy McMillan made a draw to the 4-foot against two Canadian stones to secure the win.

Team	1	2	3	4	5	6	7	8	9	10	11	Final
Canada (Stoughton)	0	1	0	0	1	0	1	0	0	2	0	5
Scotland (McMillan)	1	0	1	0	0	2	0	1	0	0	1	6

1999 Ford World Curling Championship
(Scotland)
Scotland
3rd title
