= 2002 World Men's Curling Championship =

- Host city: Bismarck, North Dakota
- Arena: Bismarck Civic Center
- Dates: April 6–14, 2002
- Winner: Canada
- Curling club: Ottewell CC, Edmonton, Alberta
- Skip: Randy Ferbey
- Fourth: David Nedohin
- Second: Scott Pfeifer
- Lead: Marcel Rocque
- Alternate: Dan Holowaychuk
- Coach: Brian Moore
- Finalist: Norway (Pål Trulsen)

The 2002 World Men's Curling Championship (branded as 2002 Ford World Men's Curling Championship for sponsorship reasons) was held April 6–14, 2002 at the Bismarck Civic Center in Bismarck, North Dakota.

== Teams ==
Austria	Canada	Denmark	Finland	Japan
Kitzbühel CC, Kitzbühel Skip: Alois Kreidl; Third: Stefan Salinger; Second: Andreas Unterberger; Lead: Werner Wanker; Alternate: Richard Obermoser	Ottewell CC, Edmonton, Alberta Fourth: David Nedohin; Skip: Randy Ferbey; Second: Scott Pfeifer; Lead: Marcel Rocque; Alternate: Dan Holowaychuk	Hvidovre CC Skip: Ulrik Schmidt; Third: Lasse Lavrsen; Second: Carsten Svensgaard; Lead: Bo Jensen; Alternate: Joel Ostrowski	Oulunkylä Curling, Helsinki Skip: Markku Uusipaavalniemi; Third: Wille Mäkelä; Second: Kalle Kiiskinen; Lead: Teemu Salo; Alternate: Aku Kauste	Miyota CC Skip: Hiroaki Kashiwagi; Third: Kazuto Yanagizawa; Second: Jun Nakayama; Lead: Keita Yanagizawa; Alternate: Takanori Ichimura
Norway	Scotland	Sweden	Switzerland	United States
Stabekk CC, Oslo Skip: Pål Trulsen; Third: Lars Vågberg; Second: Flemming Davanger; Lead: Bent Ånund Ramsfjell; Alternate: Niels Siggaard Andersen	Airleywight CC, Perth Skip: Warwick Smith; Third: Norman Brown; Second: Ewan MacDonald; Lead: Peter Loudon; Alternate: Tom Brewster, Jr.	Sundsvalls CK Skip: Per Carlsén; Third: Mikael Norberg; Second: Tommy Olin; Lead: Niklas Berggren; Alternate: Thomas Norgren	Lausanne-Olympique CC Skip: Patrick Hürlimann; Third: Dominic Andres; Second: Martin Romang; Lead: Diego Perren; Alternate: Patrik Lörtscher	Madison CC, Madison, Wisconsin Skip: Paul Pustovar; Third: Mike Fraboni; Second: Geoff Goodland; Lead: Richard Maskel; Alternate: Dave Nelson

== Round-robin standings ==
Key
Teams to playoffs

Country	Skip	W	L
Scotland	Warwick Smith	7	2
United States	Paul Pustovar	6	3
Canada	Randy Ferbey	6	3
Norway	Pål Trulsen	6	3
Switzerland	Patrick Hürlimann	5	4
Denmark	Ulrik Schmidt	5	4
Finland	Markku Uusipaavalniemi	5	4
Sweden	Per Carlsén	3	6
Japan	Hiroaki Kashiwagi	2	7
Austria	Alois Kreidl	0	9

== Round-robin results ==
=== Draw 1 ===
Sheet A	1	2	3	4	5	6	7	8	9	10	Final
Norway (Trulsen)	0	0	1	0	1	0	2	0	1	0	5
Denmark (Schmidt)	0	2	0	2	0	1	0	1	0	3	9

Sheet B	1	2	3	4	5	6	7	8	9	10	Final
Switzerland (Hürlimann)	0	0	2	0	2	0	0	2	0	0	6
Scotland (Smith)	1	1	0	2	0	0	1	0	0	2	7

Sheet C	1	2	3	4	5	6	7	8	9	10	Final
Finland (Uusipaavalniemi)	0	0	2	0	0	3	1	0	0	0	6
Sweden (Carlsén)	0	0	0	0	2	0	0	0	1	1	4

Sheet D	1	2	3	4	5	6	7	8	9	10	Final
United States (Pustovar)	0	2	0	1	0	2	0	2	0	1	8
Japan (Kashiwagi)	0	0	1	0	1	0	2	0	1	0	5

Sheet E	1	2	3	4	5	6	7	8	9	10	Final
Austria (Kreidl)	1	1	0	0	2	0	0	0	2	1	7
Canada (Ferbey)	0	0	2	1	0	2	1	3	0	0	9

=== Draw 2 ===
Sheet A	1	2	3	4	5	6	7	8	9	10	Final
Austria (Kreidl)	0	0	0	0	1	0	X	X	X	X	1
Switzerland (Hürlimann)	1	4	3	1	0	4	X	X	X	X	13

Sheet B	1	2	3	4	5	6	7	8	9	10	Final
Sweden (Carlsén)	1	0	1	0	0	0	1	0	0	2	5
Canada (Ferbey)	0	1	0	1	0	0	0	1	1	0	4

Sheet C	1	2	3	4	5	6	7	8	9	10	Final
Norway (Trulsen)	0	1	1	0	1	0	1	0	2	0	6
United States (Pustovar)	0	0	0	1	0	2	0	3	0	1	7

Sheet D	1	2	3	4	5	6	7	8	9	10	Final
Finland (Uusipaavalniemi)	0	0	0	0	1	0	0	2	1	0	4
Denmark (Schmidt)	0	0	0	1	0	0	2	0	0	2	5

Sheet E	1	2	3	4	5	6	7	8	9	10	Final
Scotland (Smith)	0	3	0	0	3	1	1	X	X	X	8
Japan (Kashiwagi)	0	0	1	0	0	0	0	X	X	X	1

=== Draw 3 ===
Sheet A	1	2	3	4	5	6	7	8	9	10	Final
Japan (Kashiwagi)	0	0	1	0	0	1	X	X	X	X	2
Canada (Ferbey)	1	3	0	3	2	0	X	X	X	X	9

Sheet B	1	2	3	4	5	6	7	8	9	10	Final
Denmark (Schmidt)	1	0	0	2	0	2	0	4	1	2	12
United States (Pustovar)	0	0	1	0	4	0	2	0	0	0	7

Sheet C	1	2	3	4	5	6	7	8	9	10	Final
Scotland (Smith)	2	1	0	1	0	1	3	0	X	X	8
Austria (Kreidl)	0	0	1	0	1	0	0	1	X	X	3

Sheet D	1	2	3	4	5	6	7	8	9	10	Final
Sweden (Carlsén)	0	1	0	1	0	0	0	2	0	1	5
Norway (Trulsen)	0	0	1	0	2	0	2	0	2	0	7

Sheet E	1	2	3	4	5	6	7	8	9	10	Final
Finland (Uusipaavalniemi)	0	0	0	3	0	1	0	1	0	0	5
Switzerland (Hürlimann)	0	3	1	0	2	0	1	0	2	0	9

=== Draw 4 ===
Sheet A	1	2	3	4	5	6	7	8	9	10	11	Final
Denmark (Schmidt)	0	0	4	0	0	0	3	0	2	0	0	9
Scotland (Smith)	2	0	0	1	2	0	0	2	0	2	1	10

Sheet B	1	2	3	4	5	6	7	8	9	10	11	Final
Finland (Uusipaavalniemi)	0	1	0	2	0	0	0	0	0	1	0	4
Norway (Trulsen)	2	0	1	0	0	1	0	0	0	0	1	5

Sheet C	1	2	3	4	5	6	7	8	9	10	Final
Switzerland (Hürlimann)	0	2	0	1	0	0	1	0	0	X	4
Canada (Ferbey)	3	0	0	0	2	1	0	2	3	X	11

Sheet D	1	2	3	4	5	6	7	8	9	10	Final
Japan (Kashiwagi)	0	4	0	1	2	0	1	1	0	1	10
Austria (Kreidl)	1	0	2	0	0	2	0	0	1	0	6

Sheet E	1	2	3	4	5	6	7	8	9	10	Final
United States (Pustovar)	0	2	0	0	2	0	4	0	X	X	8
Sweden (Carlsén)	0	0	0	2	0	0	0	1	X	X	3

=== Draw 5 ===
Sheet A	1	2	3	4	5	6	7	8	9	10	Final
Finland (Uusipaavalniemi)	3	1	1	0	3	0	X	X	X	X	8
Austria (Kreidl)	0	0	0	1	0	1	X	X	X	X	2

Sheet B	1	2	3	4	5	6	7	8	9	10	Final
Scotland (Smith)	1	0	0	0	0	2	2	0	0	1	6
Sweden (Carlsén)	0	0	1	0	1	0	0	2	1	0	5

Sheet C	1	2	3	4	5	6	7	8	9	10	Final
Denmark (Schmidt)	0	0	1	0	0	2	0	2	0	0	5
Japan (Kashiwagi)	1	1	0	0	2	0	1	0	1	2	8

Sheet D	1	2	3	4	5	6	7	8	9	10	11	Final
Switzerland (Hürlimann)	2	0	1	0	1	0	1	0	1	1	0	7
United States (Pustovar)	0	2	0	1	0	2	0	2	0	0	1	8

Sheet E	1	2	3	4	5	6	7	8	9	10	Final
Canada (Ferbey)	0	3	0	0	6	0	3	X	X	X	12
Norway (Trulsen)	0	0	1	1	0	2	0	X	X	X	4

=== Draw 6 ===
Sheet A	1	2	3	4	5	6	7	8	9	10	11	Final
Canada (Ferbey)	1	0	2	0	1	0	1	0	0	2	0	7
United States (Pustovar)	0	1	0	1	0	1	0	3	1	0	1	8

Sheet B	1	2	3	4	5	6	7	8	9	10	Final
Norway (Trulsen)	1	2	0	2	1	1	0	0	1	0	8
Japan (Kashiwagi)	0	0	2	0	0	0	1	1	0	0	4

Sheet C	1	2	3	4	5	6	7	8	9	10	Final
Sweden (Carlsén)	0	0	1	0	1	0	1	1	0	0	4
Switzerland (Hürlimann)	1	3	0	0	0	3	0	0	1	0	8

Sheet D	1	2	3	4	5	6	7	8	9	10	Final
Scotland (Smith)	0	1	0	1	0	2	0	0	0	0	4
Finland (Uusipaavalniemi)	2	0	2	0	1	0	0	2	0	1	8

Sheet E	1	2	3	4	5	6	7	8	9	10	Final
Denmark (Schmidt)	1	3	3	0	3	0	X	X	X	X	10
Austria (Kreidl)	0	0	0	1	0	2	X	X	X	X	3

=== Draw 7 ===
Sheet A	1	2	3	4	5	6	7	8	9	10	Final
Switzerland (Hürlimann)	0	1	0	1	1	0	0	1	X	X	4
Norway (Trulsen)	3	0	3	0	0	2	0	0	X	X	8

Sheet B	1	2	3	4	5	6	7	8	9	10	Final
Canada (Ferbey)	1	0	2	0	2	1	0	2	0	0	8
Denmark (Schmidt)	0	2	0	1	0	0	1	0	1	0	5

Sheet C	1	2	3	4	5	6	7	8	9	10	Final
United States (Pustovar)	1	0	0	0	0	1	0	0	0	X	2
Scotland (Smith)	0	1	1	1	2	0	0	1	1	X	7

Sheet D	1	2	3	4	5	6	7	8	9	10	Final
Austria (Kreidl)	0	1	0	0	0	0	X	X	X	X	1
Sweden (Carlsén)	2	0	0	5	1	3	X	X	X	X	11

Sheet E	1	2	3	4	5	6	7	8	9	10	Final
Japan (Kashiwagi)	1	0	0	0	0	1	0	1	0	0	3
Finland (Uusipaavalniemi)	0	2	0	2	1	0	1	0	0	1	7

=== Draw 8 ===
Sheet A	1	2	3	4	5	6	7	8	9	10	Final
Sweden (Carlsén)	1	0	1	0	0	0	1	1	0	1	5
Japan (Kashiwagi)	0	1	0	1	0	0	0	0	2	0	4

Sheet B	1	2	3	4	5	6	7	8	9	10	Final
United States (Pustovar)	3	0	2	2	1	2	X	X	X	X	10
Austria (Kreidl)	0	1	0	0	0	0	X	X	X	X	1

Sheet C	1	2	3	4	5	6	7	8	9	10	Final
Canada (Ferbey)	1	0	1	1	0	0	2	0	0	2	7
Finland (Uusipaavalniemi)	0	1	0	0	2	2	0	1	0	0	6

Sheet D	1	2	3	4	5	6	7	8	9	10	Final
Denmark (Schmidt)	0	1	0	1	0	2	0	0	0	X	4
Switzerland (Hürlimann)	0	0	3	0	2	0	1	3	0	X	9

Sheet E	1	2	3	4	5	6	7	8	9	10	Final
Norway (Trulsen)	0	0	1	0	0	2	0	3	0	2	8
Scotland (Smith)	1	0	0	1	0	0	2	0	2	0	6

=== Draw 9 ===
Sheet A	1	2	3	4	5	6	7	8	9	10	Final
United States (Pustovar)	0	1	0	0	0	0	X	X	X	X	1
Finland (Uusipaavalniemi)	2	0	0	2	0	3	X	X	X	X	7

Sheet B	1	2	3	4	5	6	7	8	9	10	Final
Japan (Kashiwagi)	0	0	1	0	1	1	0	X	X	X	3
Switzerland (Hürlimann)	2	1	0	3	0	0	5	X	X	X	11

Sheet C	1	2	3	4	5	6	7	8	9	10	Final
Austria (Kreidl)	0	1	0	0	0	2	X	X	X	X	3
Norway (Trulsen)	2	0	3	3	3	0	X	X	X	X	11

Sheet D	1	2	3	4	5	6	7	8	9	10	Final
Canada (Ferbey)	0	1	0	0	3	0	1	0	0	0	5
Scotland (Smith)	2	0	1	0	0	1	0	0	0	2	6

Sheet E	1	2	3	4	5	6	7	8	9	10	Final
Sweden (Carlsén)	0	1	0	1	0	0	1	0	1	0	4
Denmark (Schmidt)	1	0	1	0	1	0	0	3	0	2	8

== Playoffs ==
=== Brackets ===
Semifinals
1	Scotland	4
4	Norway	5
2	United States	6
3	Canada	10

Gold medal game
4	Norway	5
3	Canada	10
Bronze medal game
1	United States	5
2	Scotland	6

=== Semifinals ===
Team	1	2	3	4	5	6	7	8	9	10	11	Final
Scotland (Smith)	0	2	0	0	0	1	0	0	0	1	0	4
Norway (Trulsen)	0	0	0	1	0	0	2	0	1	0	1	5

Player percentages
Scotland		Norway	
Peter Loudon	88%	Bent Ånund Ramsfjell	89%
Ewan MacDonald	82%	Flemming Davanger	81%
Norman Brown	83%	Lars Vågberg	83%
Warwick Smith	79%	Pål Trulsen	83%
Total	83%	Total	84%

Team	1	2	3	4	5	6	7	8	9	10	Final
United States (Pustovar)	0	2	0	2	0	1	0	1	0	0	6
Canada (Ferbey)	1	0	1	0	2	0	2	0	2	2	10

Player percentages
United States		Canada	
Richard Maskel	84%	Marcel Rocque	91%
Geoff Goodland	69%	Scott Pfeifer	91%
Mike Fraboni	73%	Randy Ferbey	85%
Paul Pustovar	79%	David Nedohin	75%
Total	76%	Total	85%

=== Bronze medal game ===
Team	1	2	3	4	5	6	7	8	9	10	Final
United States (Pustovar)	0	1	0	1	1	0	1	0	1	0	5
Scotland (Smith)	1	0	1	0	0	2	0	1	0	1	6

Player percentages
United States		Scotland	
Richard Maskel	81%	Peter Loudon	70%
Geoff Goodland	64%	Ewan MacDonald	84%
Mike Fraboni	64%	Norman Brown	78%
Paul Pustovar	75%	Warwick Smith	68%
Total	71%	Total	75%

=== Gold medal game ===
Team	1	2	3	4	5	6	7	8	9	10	Final
Canada (Ferbey)	1	0	2	0	2	1	0	2	1	1	10
Norway (Trulsen)	0	2	0	1	0	0	2	0	0	0	5

Player percentages
Canada		Norway	
Marcel Rocque	88%	Bent Ånund Ramsfjell	89%
Scott Pfeifer	94%	Flemming Davanger	70%
Randy Ferbey	85%	Lars Vågberg	72%
David Nedohin	79%	Pål Trulsen	69%
Total	86%	Total	75%

2002 Ford World Curling Championship
(Canada)
Canada
27th title

== Top player percentages ==
Leads	%	Seconds	%	Thirds	%	Skips	%
(Canada) Marcel Rocque	88	(Scotland) Ewan MacDonald	85	(Switzerland) Dominic Andres	84	(Finland) Markku Uusipaavalniemi	84
(Scotland) Peter Loudon	84	(Canada) Scott Pfeifer	84	(Scotland) Norman Brown	83	(Scotland) Warwick Smith	80
(Norway) Bent Ånund Ramsfjell	84	(Switzerland) Martin Romang	82	(Canada) Randy Ferbey	82	(Canada) David Nedohin	79
(Sweden) Niklas Berggren	84	(Norway) Flemming Davanger	81	(Finland) Wille Mäkelä	82	(Switzerland) Patrick Hürlimann	77
(Japan) Keita Yanagizawa	83	(Sweden) Tommy Olin	80	(Sweden) Mikael Norberg	80	(Denmark) Ulrik Schmidt	77
