= Tommy Olin =

Swedish male curler and coach

- Curler ♂
- Born: 4 July 1962 (age 64)

Team
- Curling club: Sundsvalls CK, Sundsvall

Curling career
- Member Association: Sweden
- World Championship: 2 (1999, 2002)
- European Championship: 2 (1984, 1992)
- Other appearances: World Senior Championships: 1 (2019)
Medal record
Curling
European Championships
Silver medal – second place	1992 Perth
Swedish Men's Championship
Gold medal – first place	1984
Gold medal – first place	1992

Tommy Karl-Gustaf Olin (born 4 July 1962) is a Swedish curler and curling coach.

He is a 1992 European championship silver medallist and four-time Swedish men's champion. two Swedish cup titles and two Elitserie titles.

In 2002 he was inducted into the Swedish Curling Hall of Fame.

== Teams ==
Season	Skip	Third	Second	Lead	Alternate	Coach	Events
1983–84	Per Carlsén	Jan Strandlund	Tommy Olin	Olle Håkansson			SMCC 1984 (gold)
1984–85	Per Carlsén	Jan Strandlund	Tommy Olin	Olle Håkansson			ECC 1984 (7th)
1991–92	Per Carlsén	Henrik Holmberg	Tommy Olin	Stefan Larsson			SMCC 1992 (gold)
1992–93	Per Carlsén	Henrik Holmberg	Tommy Olin	Olle Håkansson	Mikael Norberg		ECC 1992 (silver)
1998–99	Per Carlsén	Mikael Norberg	Tommy Olin	Niklas Berggren	Jan Strandlund	Stefan Larsson	WCC 1999 (9th)
2001–02	Per Carlsén	Mikael Norberg	Tommy Olin	Niklas Berggren	Thomas Norgren	Olle Håkansson	WCC 2002 (8th)
2008–09	Per Carlsén	Mikael Norberg	Tommy Olin	Niklas Berggren			
2015–16	Per Carsén	Mikael Ljungberg	Anders Lööf	Tommy Olin	Dan Carlsén		SSCC 2016 (bronze)
2018–19	Per Noreen (fourth)	Per Carlsén (skip)	Fredrik Hallström	Tommy Olin	Dan-Ola Eriksson	Niklas Berggren	WSCC 2019 (5th)

== Record as a coach of national teams ==
Year	Tournament, event	National team	Place
2010	2010 World Men's Curling Championship	Sweden (men)	8
