= 1991 World Men's Curling Championship =

- Host city: Winnipeg, Manitoba, Canada
- Arena: Winnipeg Arena
- Dates: March 23–31, 1991
- Winner: Scotland
- Curling club: St. Martins CC, Perth
- Skip: David Smith
- Third: Graeme Connal
- Second: Peter Smith
- Lead: David Hay
- Alternate: Mike Hay
- Finalist: Canada (Kevin Martin)

The 1991 World Men's Curling Championship (branded as 1991 Canada Safeway World Men's Curling Championship for sponsorship reasons) took place from March 23 to 31 at the Winnipeg Arena in Winnipeg, Manitoba, Canada.

== Teams ==
| Canada | Denmark | Finland | France | Germany |
|---|---|---|---|---|
| Avonair CC, Edmonton, Alberta Skip: Kevin Martin; Third: Kevin Park; Second: Dan Petryk; Lead: Don Bartlett; Alternate: Jules Owchar | Hvidovre CC Skip: Christian Thune; Third: Niels Siggaard; Second: Henrik Jakobsen; Lead: Lasse Lavrsen; Alternate: Anders Søderblom | Hyvinkää CC Skip: Jussi Uusipaavalniemi; Third: Jari Laukkanen; Second: Jori Aro; Lead: Marko Poikolainen; Alternate: Juhani Heinonen | Megève CC Skip: Dominique Dupont-Roc; Third: Claude Feige; Second: Thierry Mercier; Lead: Patrick Philippe; Alternate: Daniel Moratelli | EV Füssen Skip: Andy Kapp; Third: Florian Zörgiebel; Second: Cristopher Huber; Lead: Michael Schäffer; Alternate: Ulrich Schneider |
| Norway | Scotland | Sweden | Switzerland | United States |
| Snarøen CC, Oslo Skip: Eigil Ramsfjell; Third: Sjur Loen; Second: Niclas Järund; Lead: Morten Skaug; Alternate: Dagfinn Loen | St. Martins CC, Perth Skip: David Smith; Third: Graeme Connal; Second: Peter Smith; Lead: David Hay; Alternate: Mike Hay | Karlstads CK Skip: Dan-Ola Eriksson; Third: Sören Grahn; Second: Jonas Sjölander; Lead: Stefan Holmén; Alternate: Håkan Funk | Biel-Touring CC, Biel Skip: Markus Eggler; Third: Frédéric Jean; Second: Stefan Hofer; Lead: Björn Schröder | Madison CC, Madison, Wisconsin Skip: Steve Brown; Third: Paul Pustovar; Second: George Godfrey; Lead: Wally Henry; Alternate: Mike Fraboni |

== Round-robin standings ==
Key
| Teams to playoffs |

| Country | Skip | W | L |
|---|---|---|---|
| Canada | Kevin Martin | 9 | 0 |
| Scotland | David Smith | 7 | 2 |
| United States | Steve Brown | 6 | 3 |
| Norway | Eigil Ramsfjell | 6 | 3 |
| Switzerland | Markus Eggler | 5 | 4 |
| Sweden | Dan-Ola Eriksson | 4 | 5 |
| Germany | Andy Kapp | 3 | 6 |
| Denmark | Christian Thune | 2 | 7 |
| France | Dominique Dupont-Roc | 2 | 7 |
| Finland | Jussi Uusipaavalniemi | 1 | 8 |

== Round-robin results ==
=== Draw 1 ===
| Sheet A | Final |
| Canada (Martin) | 8 |
| United States (Brown) | 2 |

| Sheet B | Final |
| Scotland (Smith) | 6 |
| France (Dupont-Roc) | 5 |

| Sheet C | Final |
| Switzerland (Eggler) | 5 |
| Norway (Ramsfjell) | 0 |

| Sheet D | Final |
| Denmark (Thune) | 6 |
| Sweden (Eriksson) | 8 |

| Sheet E | Final |
| Finland (Uusipaavalniemi) | 4 |
| Germany (Kapp) | 5 |

=== Draw 2 ===
| Sheet A | Final |
| Germany (Kapp) | 6 |
| Denmark (Thune) | 8 |

| Sheet B | Final |
| Norway (Ramsfjell) | 6 |
| Sweden (Eriksson) | 3 |

| Sheet C | Final |
| France (Dupont-Roc) | 4 |
| Switzerland (Eggler) | 7 |

| Sheet D | Final |
| Canada (Martin) | 7 |
| Finland (Uusipaavalniemi) | 4 |

| Sheet E | Final |
| United States (Brown) | 5 |
| Scotland (Smith) | 6 |

=== Draw 3 ===
| Sheet A | Final |
| Sweden (Eriksson) | 5 |
| Canada (Martin) | 7 |

| Sheet B | Final |
| Denmark (Thune) | 4 |
| Switzerland (Eggler) | 5 |

| Sheet C | Final |
| Scotland (Smith) | 7 |
| Germany (Kapp) | 3 |

| Sheet D | Final |
| France (Dupont-Roc) | 8 |
| United States (Brown) | 6 |

| Sheet E | Final |
| Finland (Uusipaavalniemi) | 3 |
| Norway (Ramsfjell) | 6 |

=== Draw 4 ===
| Sheet A | Final |
| Scotland (Smith) | 5 |
| Switzerland (Eggler) | 8 |

| Sheet B | Final |
| Sweden (Eriksson) | 7 |
| Finland (Uusipaavalniemi) | 1 |

| Sheet C | Final |
| United States (Brown) | 5 |
| Denmark (Thune) | 2 |

| Sheet D | Final |
| Norway (Ramsfjell) | 2 |
| Canada (Martin) | 7 |

| Sheet E | Final |
| Germany (Kapp) | 6 |
| France (Dupont-Roc) | 1 |

=== Draw 5 ===
| Sheet A | Final |
| Canada (Martin) | 6 |
| France (Dupont-Roc) | 5 |

| Sheet B | Final |
| Finland (Uusipaavalniemi) | 1 |
| Scotland (Smith) | 7 |

| Sheet C | Final |
| Norway (Ramsfjell) | 8 |
| Denmark (Thune) | 3 |

| Sheet D | Final |
| Germany (Kapp) | 6 |
| Switzerland (Eggler) | 5 |

| Sheet E | Final |
| United States (Brown) | 8 |
| Sweden (Eriksson) | 5 |

=== Draw 6 ===
| Sheet A | Final |
| Canada (Martin) | 7 |
| Denmark (Thune) | 3 |

| Sheet B | Final |
| Switzerland (Eggler) | 9 |
| Sweden (Eriksson) | 3 |

| Sheet C | Final |
| Germany (Kapp) | 2 |
| United States (Brown) | 9 |

| Sheet D | Final |
| Norway (Ramsfjell) | 2 |
| Scotland (Smith) | 4 |

| Sheet E | Final |
| Finland (Uusipaavalniemi) | 3 |
| France (Dupont-Roc) | 5 |

=== Draw 7 ===
| Sheet A | Final |
| Switzerland (Eggler) | 3 |
| United States (Brown) | 5 |

| Sheet B | Final |
| Denmark (Thune) | 5 |
| Finland (Uusipaavalniemi) | 6 |

| Sheet C | Final |
| France (Dupont-Roc) | 3 |
| Norway (Ramsfjell) | 4 |

| Sheet D | Final |
| Sweden (Eriksson) | 8 |
| Germany (Kapp) | 4 |

| Sheet E | Final |
| Scotland (Smith) | 5 |
| Canada (Martin) | 8 |

=== Draw 8 ===
| Sheet A | Final |
| Norway (Ramsfjell) | 6 |
| Germany (Kapp) | 5 |

| Sheet B | Final |
| United States (Brown) | 9 |
| Finland (Uusipaavalniemi) | 2 |

| Sheet C | Final |
| Canada (Martin) | 8 |
| Switzerland (Eggler) | 7 |

| Sheet D | Final |
| Scotland (Smith) | 6 |
| Denmark (Thune) | 3 |

| Sheet E | Final |
| France (Dupont-Roc) | 4 |
| Sweden (Eriksson) | 7 |

=== Draw 9 ===
| Sheet A | Final |
| Sweden (Eriksson) | 4 |
| Scotland (Smith) | 7 |

| Sheet B | Final |
| Germany (Kapp) | 1 |
| Canada (Martin) | 7 |

| Sheet C | Final |
| Denmark (Thune) | 7 |
| France (Dupont-Roc) | 6 |

| Sheet D | Final |
| United States (Brown) | 6 |
| Norway (Ramsfjell) | 4 |

| Sheet E | Final |
| Switzerland (Eggler) | 6 |
| Finland (Uusipaavalniemi) | 4 |

== Playoffs ==
Semifinals
1 | Canada | 5
4 | Norway | 3
2 | Scotland | 4
3 | United States | 2

Final
1 | Canada | 2
2 | Scotland | 7

=== Semifinals ===
| Team | Final |
| Canada (Martin) | 5 |
| Norway (Ramsfjell) | 3 |

| Team | Final |
| Scotland (Smith) | 4 |
| United States (Brown) | 2 |

=== Final ===
| Team | 1 | 2 | 3 | 4 | 5 | 6 | 7 | 8 | 9 | 10 | Final |
|---|---|---|---|---|---|---|---|---|---|---|---|
| Canada (Martin) | 0 | 0 | 0 | 0 | 0 | 2 | 0 | 0 | X | X | 2 |
| Scotland (Smith) | 0 | 0 | 1 | 2 | 0 | 0 | 1 | 3 | X | X | 7 |

1991 Safeway Curling Championship
(Scotland)
Scotland
2nd title
