= Carla Casper =

American curler (1945–2023)

- Curler
- Born: November 10, 1945; Wild Rose, Wisconsin, U.S.
- Died: February 20, 2023 (aged 77); Las Vegas, Nevada, U.S.

Curling career
- Olympic: 1 (1988)
Medal record
Women's curling
Representing Wisconsin
United States Olympic Curling Trials
Gold medal – first place	1987 St Paul

Carla Casper (November 10, 1945 – February 20, 2023) was an American curler and Olympian. At the time of the 1988 Olympics, she was living in Green Bay, Wisconsin.

In 1987 Lisa Schoeneberg invited Casper to join her team just two weeks before the tournament to determine Wisconsin's representative to the United States' first Olympic Curling Trials, replacing a teammate with a burst appendix. Casper joined as the team's second, with Lori Mountford at lead, Erika Brown at third, and Schoeneberg as skip. Brown's father, World bronze medalist Steve Brown, was the team's coach and her mother, Diane, was the team's alternate player. The team won the tournament, earning a spot at the Olympic Trials in Saint Paul, Minnesota. They upset the top two teams from that year's national championship to win the Trials and earn their spot as the American women's team at the 1988 Olympics. At the Olympic Games, where curling was a demonstration event, they finished fifth out of eight teams, with a 4–4 record.

As skip of her own team Casper won the Wisconsin State Championship four years in a row, 1987–1990.

Casper was named President of the United States Women's Curling Association, an organization with the purpose of promoting the sport of curling among women and youth, for 2000–2001.

== Personal life ==
Casper was married to Tom Casper, a fellow curler and curling coach, and they had four children. She died on February 20, 2023, in Las Vegas, Nevada.
