= Niklas Berggren =

Swedish male curler and coach

- Curler ♂
- Born: 25 January 1966 (age 60)

Team
- Curling club: Sundsvalls CK, Sundsvall

Curling career
- Member Association: Sweden
- World Championship: 4 (1999, 2002, 2003, 2010)
Medal record
Curling

Jan Niklas Berggren (born 25 January 1966) is a Swedish curler and curling coach.

He competed for Sweden in four World men's championships.

== Teams ==
| Season | Skip | Third | Second | Lead | Alternate | Coach | Events |
|---|---|---|---|---|---|---|---|
| 1998–99 | Per Carlsén | Mikael Norberg | Tommy Olin | Niklas Berggren | Jan Strandlund | Stefan Larsson | WCC 1999 (9th) |
| 2001–02 | Per Carlsén | Mikael Norberg | Tommy Olin | Niklas Berggren | Thomas Norgren | Olle Håkansson | WCC 2002 (8th) |
| 2002–03 | Per Carlsén | Mikael Norberg | Rickard Hallström | Fredrik Hallström | Niklas Berggren | Olle Håkansson | WCC 2003 (5th) |
| 2008–09 | Per Carlsén | Mikael Norberg | Tommy Olin | Niklas Berggren | | | |
| 2009–10 | Per Carlsén | Nils Carlsén | Eric Carlsén | Niklas Berggren | Mikael Norberg | Tommy Olin | WCC 2010 (8th) |

== Record as a coach of national teams ==
| Year | Tournament, event | National team | Place |
|---|---|---|---|
| 2019 | 2019 World Senior Curling Championships | Sweden (senior men) | 5 |

== Personal life ==
His father Tom is a curler as well. He is a 1974 World championship silver medallist and a 1974 Swedish men's curling champion.
