= Lisa Schoeneberg =

American curler

- Curler
- Born: September 29, 1957 (age 69); Poynette, Wisconsin, U.S.

Team
- Curling club: Madison CC, Madison, Wisconsin

Curling career
- World Championship: 4 (1990,1992,1995,1996)
- Olympic: 2 (1988,1998)
Medal record
Women's curling
Representing United States
World Championships
Silver medal – second place	1992 Garmisch-Partenkirchen
Silver medal – second place	1996 Hamilton
United States National Championships
Gold medal – first place	1992 Grafton
Gold medal – first place	1995 Appleton
Gold medal – first place	1996 Bemidji
United States Olympic Curling Trials
Gold medal – first place	1987 St Paul
Gold medal – first place	1997 Duluth

Lisa Schoeneberg (born September 29, 1957) is an American curler and Olympian. She was a successful skip in the late 1980s and throughout the 1990s, leading her teams to two silver medals at the World Championships and represented the United States at the Olympic Games twice.

== Curling career ==
In 1987 Schoeneberg and her team of Carla Casper, Lori Mountford, and Erika Brown competed at the United States' first Olympic Curling Trials, as curling was reintroduced at the 1988 Winter Olympics as a demonstration event. They upset the top two teams from that year's national championship to win the Trials and earn their spot as the American women's team at the Olympics. At the Games they finished 5th out of 8 teams, with a 4–4 record.

Also in 1988, Schoeneberg played as vice-skip for Steve Brown when they won the United States Mixed Curling Championship.

Schoeneberg made her first appearance at the World Championships in 1990 in Västerås when she joined Bev Behnke's team, who had won the US National Championship, as alternate. They finished in 8th with a record of 3–7.

Three times in the next six years Schoeneberg returned to the World Championships, but as skip instead of alternate. In 1992, 1995, and 1996 Schoeneberg led her team to the gold medal at the US National Championships and on to represent the United States at World's. At the 1992 World Championship in Garmisch-Partenkirchen the American women lost to Team Sweden in the championship game, resulting in a silver medal. At the 1995 World Championship in Brandon they missed the playoffs, finished tied for 5th with a 4–5 record. At the 1996 World Championship in Hamilton Schoeneberg's team again found success, making it to the championship game for a second time. This time they lost to Team Canada, again claiming the silver medal.

Schoeneberg returned to the Olympics as skip at the 1998 Winter Games in Nagano, where curling made its debut as a full event. The American team achieved 2 wins and 5 losses in the round-robin tournament, finishing tied for 5th place.

Schoeneberg was inducted into the United States Curling Association (USCA) Hall of Fame in 2006 and four times she has been named the USCA Female Athlete of the Year: in 1987, 1992, 1995, and 1996.

== Teams ==
=== Women's ===
Season	Skip	Third	Second	Lead	Alternate	Coach	Events
1984–85	Cindy Kortebein (fourth)	Diane Brown (skip)	Lisa Schoeneberg	Mary Jaeger			
1987–88	Lisa Schoeneberg	Erika Brown	Carla Casper	Lori Mountford			1987 USOCT (gold); 1988 OG (5th)
1989–90	Bev Behnke	Dawna Bennett	Susan Anschuetz	Pam Finch	Lisa Schoeneberg		1990 WWCC (8th)
1990–91	Lisa Schoeneberg	Erika Brown	Lori Mountford	Jill Jones	Vicki Bodeen		
1991–92	Lisa Schoeneberg	Amy Hatten-Wright	Lori Mountford	Jill Jones			1992 USWCC (gold); 1992 WWCC (silver)
1993–94	Lisa Schoeneberg	Amy Wright	Lori Mountford	Marcia Tillisch			
1994–95	Lisa Schoeneberg	Erika Brown	Lori Mountford	Marcia Tillisch	Allison Darragh		1995 USWCC (gold); 1995 WWCC (6th)
1995–96	Lisa Schoeneberg	Erika Brown	Lori Mountford	Allison Darragh	Debbie Henry		1996 USWCC (gold); 1996 WWCC (silver)
1997–98	Lisa Schoeneberg	Erika Brown	Debbie Henry	Lori Mountford	Stacey Liapis	Steve Brown	1997 USOCT (gold); 1998 OG (5th)

=== Mixed ===
Season	Skip	Third	Second	Lead	Events
1988	Steve Brown	Lisa Schoeneberg	Paul Schaefer	Bonnie Mansfield	1988 USMxCC (gold)
