= Ed Sheffield =

American curler

- Curler ♂

Team
- Curling club: Madison CC, Madison, Wisconsin

Curling career
- Member Association: United States
- World Championship: 1 (1982)
Medal record
Curling
United States Men's Championship
| Gold medal – first place | 1982 Brookline |

Ed Sheffield is an American curler.

He is a 1982 United States men's champion curler.

== Teams ==
| Season | Skip | Third | Second | Lead | Coach | Events |
|---|---|---|---|---|---|---|
| 1979–80 | Steve Brown | Ed Sheffield | George Godfrey | Vince Fitzgerald | | |
| 1981–82 | Steve Brown | Ed Sheffield | Huns Gustrowsky | George Godfrey | Elgie Noble | USMCC 1982 (gold); WCC 1982 (9th) |
