= Wally Henry (curler) =

American male curler and coach

- Curler ♂
- Born: May 5, 1947 (age 79); Portage la Prairie, Manitoba, Canada

Team
- Curling club: Madison CC, Madison, Wisconsin

Curling career
- Member Association: United States
- World Championship: 2 (1986, 1991)
- Other appearances: World Senior Championships: 1 (2007)
Medal record
Curling
World Championships
Bronze medal – third place	1986 Toronto
Bronze medal – third place	1991 Winnipeg
United States Men's Championship
Gold medal – first place	1986 Seattle
Gold medal – first place	1991 Utica
Silver medal – second place	1987 Lake Placid
Silver medal – second place	1989 Detroit

Wally Henry (born May 5, 1947, in Portage la Prairie, Manitoba, Canada) is an American curler and curling coach.

He is a 1986 and 1991 World Men's bronze medallist and a two times United States men's curling champion (1986, 1991).

He worked as a national coach for United States Curling Association.

== Awards ==
- USA Curling Coach of the Year: 2007

== Teams ==
Season	Skip	Third	Second	Lead	Alternate	Events
1985–86	Steve Brown	Wally Henry	George Godfrey	Richard Maskel	Huns Gustrowsky	USMCC 1986 (gold); WCC 1986 (bronze)
1990–91	Steve Brown	Paul Pustovar	George Godfrey	Wally Henry	Mike Fraboni	USMCC 1991 (gold); WCC 1991 (bronze)
2006–07	Geoff Goodland	Stan Vinge	Wally Henry	Jim Wilson		USSCC 2007 (gold); WSCC 2007 (4th)

== Record as a coach of national teams ==
Year	Tournament, event	National team	Place
2003	2003 World Women's Curling Championship	United States (women)	1st place, gold medalist(s)
2005	2005 Pacific Curling Championships	Chinese Taipei (women)	5
2006	2006 World Women's Curling Championship	United States (women)	2nd place, silver medalist(s)
2007	2007 World Women's Curling Championship	United States (women)	4
2008	2008 World Women's Curling Championship	United States (women)	7
2009	2009 World Women's Curling Championship	United States (women)	9
2010	2010 Winter Olympics	United States (women)	10
2012	2012 Winter Youth Olympics	United States (mixed)	5
2012	2012 Winter Youth Olympics	United States (mixed doubles)	3rd place, bronze medalist(s)
2012	2012 Winter Youth Olympics	United States (mixed doubles)	5
2016	2016 World Junior Curling Championships	United States (junior men)	2nd place, silver medalist(s)
2016	2016 World Mixed Doubles Curling Championship	United States (mixed doubles)	3rd place, bronze medalist(s)

== Personal life ==
His daughter Debbie McCormick is World and US curling champion, and his son Donnie Henry is a curler too.

Wally Henry started curling in 1955, when he was 8 years old.
