= Huns Gustrowsky =

American curler

- Curler ♂

Team
- Curling club: Madison CC, Madison, Wisconsin

Curling career
- Member Association: United States
- World Championship: 2 (1982, 1986)
Medal record
Curling
World Championships
Bronze medal – third place	1986 Toronto
United States Men's Championship
Gold medal – first place	1982 Brookline
Silver medal – second place	1985 Mequon

Harold "Huns" Gustrowsky is an American curler, originally from Pardeeville, Wisconsin.

He is a 1986 World Men's bronze medallist and a one-time United States men's curling champion (1982).

From 1988 to 1990 he was a president of Wisconsin State Curling Association.

As of 1985, Gustrowsky worked as a field claims representative for Employers Insurance of Wausau.

== Teams ==
Season	Skip	Third	Second	Lead	Alternate	Coach	Events
1981–82	Steve Brown	Ed Sheffield	Huns Gustrowsky	George Godfrey		Elgie Noble	USMCC 1982 (gold); WCC 1982 (9th)
1984–85	Steve Brown	Geoff Goodland	George Godfrey	Huns Gustrowsky			USMCC 1985 (silver)
1985–86	Steve Brown	Wally Henry	George Godfrey	Richard Maskel	Huns Gustrowsky		1986 WMCC (bronze)
