= Dave Nelson (curler) =

American curler

- Curler
- Born: November 6, 1974 (age 52); Lodi, Wisconsin, U.S.

Team
- Curling club: Madison CC, Madison, Wisconsin

Curling career
- Member Association: United States
- World Championship: 1 (2002)

David Nelson (born November 6, 1974) is an American curler.

== Teams ==
Season	Skip	Third	Second	Lead	Alternate	Coach	Events
1999–00	Donnie Henry	Jim Jeruelle, Jr.	Jeremy Sigel	Dave Nelson			
2001–02	Paul Pustovar	Mike Fraboni	Geoff Goodland	Richard Maskel	Dave Nelson	Mike Liapis	WCC 2002 (4th)
2002–03	Dave Nelson	Pat Roe	Jeremy Roe	Mark Hartmann			
2003–04	Donnie Henry	Dave Nelson	Jeff Wright	Sean Silver			
2004–05	Dave Nelson	Paul Hanke	Tim Ebert	Tim Patterson			
