= Richard Maskel =

American curler

- Curler ♂
- Born: July 4, 1954 (age 72); Kapuskasing, Ontario, Canada

Team
- Curling club: Madison CC, Madison, Wisconsin

Curling career
- Member Association: United States
- World Championship: 2 (1986, 2002)
Medal record
Curling
World Championships
Bronze medal – third place	1986 Toronto
United States Men's Championship
Gold medal – first place	1986 Seattle
Gold medal – first place	2002 Eveleth
Silver medal – second place	1987 Lake Placid
Silver medal – second place	1990 Superior
Silver medal – second place	1992 Grafton
Silver medal – second place	1995 Appleton
Silver medal – second place	1997 Seattle
Bronze medal – third place	1988 St. Paul
Bronze medal – third place	1989 Detroit
Bronze medal – third place	1994 Duluth
Bronze medal – third place	1996 Bemidji
Bronze medal – third place	2000 Ogden

Richard (Dick) Maskel (born July 4, 1954, in Kapuskasing, Ontario, Canada) is an American curler from Green Bay, Wisconsin.

He is a 1986 World Men's bronze medallist and a two-time United States men's curling champion (1986, 2002).

== Teams ==
=== Men's ===
Season	Skip	Third	Second	Lead	Alternate	Coach	Events
1973–74	Richard Maskel	?	?	?			1974 USJCC (bronze)
1985–86	Steve Brown	Wally Henry	George Godfrey	Richard Maskel	Huns Gustrowsky		1986 USMCC (gold); 1986 WMCC (bronze)
1986–87	Steve Brown	Wally Henry	George Godfrey	Richard Maskel			1987 USMCC (silver)
1987–88	Steve Brown	Wally Henry	George Godfrey	Richard Maskel			1988 USMCC (bronze)
1988–89	Steve Brown	Wally Henry	George Godfrey	Richard Maskel			1989 USMCC (bronze)
1989–90	Steve Brown	Paul Pustovar	George Godfrey	Richard Maskel	Mike Fraboni		1990 USMCC (silver)
1990–91	Tim Wright	John Jahant	James C. Wilson	Richard Maskel			1991 USMCC (5th)
1991–92	Steve Brown	George Godfrey	Richard Maskel	Mike Fraboni			1992 USMCC (silver)
1993–94	Steve Brown	Richard Maskel	George Godfrey	Paul Pustovar			1994 USMCC (bronze)
1994–95	Paul Pustovar	Dave Violette	Richard Maskel	Steve Brown			1995 USMCC (silver)
1995–96	Richard Maskel	?	?	?			1996 USMCC (bronze)
1996–97	Steve Brown	Dave Violette	Richard Maskel	Paul Pustovar			
1996–97	Richard Maskel	?	?	?			1997 USMCC (silver)
1998–99	Bryan Wight	Sean Silver	?	Richard Maskel			
1999–00	Ragnar Kamp	Grayland Cousins	Richard Maskel	Mark Swanby			2000 USMCC (bronze)
2000–01	Ragnar Kamp	Grayland Cousins	Richard Maskel	Mark Swanby			2001 USMCC (9th)
2001–02	Paul Pustovar	Mike Fraboni	Geoff Goodland	Richard Maskel	Dave Nelson (WMCC)	Michael Liapis	2002 USMCC (gold); 2002 WMCC (4th)
2002–03	Paul Pustovar	Mike Fraboni	Geoff Goodland	Richard Maskel			2002 CCC (gold); 2003 USMCC (14th)
2003–04	Paul Pustovar	Mike Fraboni	Geoff Goodland	Richard Maskel			
2004–05	Paul Pustovar	Greg Wilson	Geoff Goodland	Richard Maskel			
2005–06	Paul Pustovar	Greg Wilson	Patrick Roe	Richard Maskel			2006 USMCC (7th)
2006–07	Paul Pustovar	Greg Wilson	Patrick Roe	Richard Maskel			2007 USMCC (6th)
2007–08	Jeremy Roe	Patrick Roe	Richard Maskel	Mark Hartman	Matt Hamilton		2008 USMCC (9th)
2008–09	Kevin Deeren	Kraig Deeren	Joseph Bonfoey	Richard Maskel			2009 USMCC/USOCT (10th)
2009–10	Wes Johnson	Leon Romaniuk	Paul Lyttle	Richard Maskel			2010 USMCC (6th)
2010–11	Greg Eigner	Richard Maskel	Dwayne Jacobson	Lionel Locke			
2011–12	David Brown	Leon Romaniuk	Jeremy Roe	Richard Maskel			
2012–13	Jeremy Roe	Steve Day	Richard Maskel	Mark Hartman			
2013–14	Kent Beadle	Dave Jensen	Richard Maskel	Roger Smith			
2014–15	Kent Beadle	Dave Jensen	Richard Maskel	Roger Smith			
2015–16	Jeremy Roe	Willie Wilberg	Theran Michaelis	Richard Maskel			
2016–17	Willie Wilberg	Dwayne Jacobson	Ryan Kernosky	Richard Maskel			
2017–18	Willie Wilberg	Dwayne Jacobson	Ryan Kernosky	Richard Maskel			

=== Mixed ===
Season	Skip	Third	Second	Lead	Events
1991	Richard Maskel	?	?	?	1991 USMxCC (bronze)
1994	Mike Fraboni	Marcia Tillisch	Richard Maskel	Joni Cotten	1994 USMxCC (bronze)
1997	Richard Maskel	?	?	?	1997 USMxCC (7th)
2001	Richard Maskel	?	?	?	2001 USMxCC (5th)
2003	Richard Maskel	?	?	?	2003 USMxCC (???th)
2005	Jeremy Roe	Lori Karst	Richard Maskel	Stephanie Erstad	2005 USMxCC (4th)
2008	Richard Maskel	?	?	?	2008 USMxCC (bronze)
