= 2002 World Senior Curling Championships =

- Host city: Bismarck, North Dakota, United States
- Arena: Civic Arena & Bismarck Curling Rink
- Dates: April 7–12
- Men's winner: United States
- Skip: Larry Johnson
- Third: Stan Vinge
- Second: George Godfrey
- Lead: Bill Kind
- Alternate: Steve Brown
- Finalist: Canada (Ron Westcott)
- Women's winner: Canada
- Skip: Anne Dunn
- Third: Lindy Marchuk
- Second: Gloria Campbell
- Lead: Carol Thompson
- Alternate: Fran Todd
- Finalist: Switzerland (Erika Müller)

The 2002 World Senior Curling Championships were held from April 7 to 12 at the Civic Arena and Bismarck Curling Rink in Bismarck, North Dakota, United States.

The tournament was partly held in conjunction with 2002 World Men's Curling Championship and 2002 World Women's Curling Championship.

== Men ==
=== Teams ===
Country	Skip	Third	Second	Lead	Alternate	Curling club
Canada	Ron Westcott	Ray Fillion	Ray McDougall	Brian Copeland		
England	D. Michael Sutherland	Tommy Campbell	John MacDougall	Ronald Thwaites		
Germany	Charlie Kapp	Karl-Dieter Schäfer	Anton Grief	Rudi Ibald	Klaus Unterstab	
Scotland	Iain Baxter	James Muir	Sandy Brown	Harry Ferguson	Andrew Hepburn	
Sweden	Stig Sewik	Rune Johansson	Per Olsson	Göran Holmberg	Klas Nerman	Karlstads CK
Switzerland	Allen Gulka	Daniel Lapointe	Jean-Bernard Jaquet	Michel Gruner	Francis Apothéloz	
United States	Larry Johnson	Stan Vinge	George Godfrey	Bill Kind	Steve Brown	

=== Round robin ===
Place	Team	1	2	3	4	5	6	7	Wins	Losses
1	United States	*	6:4	5:4	7:4	4:7	10:6	5:3	5	1
2	Canada	4:6	*	9:4	8:7	4:7	9:3	10:1	4	2
3	Sweden	4:5	4:9	*	9:4	9:7	10:2	8:4	4	2
4	Germany	4:7	7:8	4:9	*	4:3	7:4	4:3	3	3
5	Scotland	7:4	7:4	7:9	3:4	*	10:5	4:5	3	3
6	England	6:10	3:9	2:10	4:7	5:10	*	9:5	1	5
7	Switzerland	3:5	1:10	4:8	3:4	5:4	5:9	*	1	5

Teams to playoffs
Teams to tiebreaker

==== Tiebreaker ====
Team	1	2	3	4	5	6	7	8	Final
Canada									12
Switzerland									6

=== Playoffs ===
Final

Team	1	2	3	4	5	6	7	8	Final
United States 🔨	1	1	3	0	0	0	3	X	8
Canada	0	0	0	1	1	0	0	X	2

=== Final standings ===
Place	Team	Games played	Wins	Losses
1st place, gold medalist(s)	United States	7	6	1
2nd place, silver medalist(s)	Canada	8	5	3
3rd place, bronze medalist(s)	Sweden	7	4	3
4	Germany	6	3	3
5	Scotland	6	3	3
6	England	6	1	5
7	Switzerland	6	1	5

== Women ==
=== Teams ===
Country	Skip	Third	Second	Lead	Alternate	Curling club
Canada	Anne Dunn	Lindy Marchuk	Gloria Campbell	Carol Thompson	Fran Todd	
Scotland	Christine Kerr	Margaret McLauchin	Margaret Withycombe	Jane Moira Paterson		
Switzerland	Erika Müller	Barbara Becher	Annie Morell	Anne Marie Schuepbach	Heidi Schlapbach	CC Bern
United States	Nancy Dinsdale	Donna Purkey	Linda Handyside	Ray Morgan	Barbara Corneslen	

=== Round robin ===
Place	Team	1	2	3	4	Wins	Losses
1	Canada	*	3:7; 8:2	7:9; 10:2	8:4; 9:3	4	2
2	Switzerland	7:3; 2:8	*	9:6; 2:9	6:7; 9:7	3	3
3	United States	9:7; 2:10	6:9; 9:2	*	4:8; 10:3	3	3
4	Scotland	4:8; 3:9	7:6; 7:9	8:4; 3:10	*	2	4

Teams to playoffs
Teams to tiebreaker

==== Tiebreaker ====
Sheet A	1	2	3	4	5	6	7	8	Final
Switzerland									6
United States									4

=== Playoffs ===
Final

Team	1	2	3	4	5	6	7	8	Final
Switzerland 🔨	0	2	0	0	1	0	0	X	3
Canada	1	0	2	1	0	1	4	X	9

=== Final standings ===
Place	Team	Games played	Wins	Losses
1st place, gold medalist(s)	Canada	7	5	2
2nd place, silver medalist(s)	Switzerland	8	4	4
3rd place, bronze medalist(s)	United States	7	3	4
4	Scotland	6	2	4
