= 2012 United States Junior Curling Championships =

- Host city: McFarland, Wisconsin
- Arena: Madison Curling Club
- Dates: January 28 – February 4
- Men's winner: Massachusetts
- Curling club: Southborough, Massachusetts
- Skip: Stephen Dropkin
- Third: Korey Dropkin
- Second: Thomas Howell
- Lead: Derek Corbett
- Alternate: Cameron Ross
- Finalist: Wisconsin 2 (Blake Morton)
- Women's winner: Minnesota 2
- Curling club: Duluth, Minnesota
- Skip: Cory Christensen
- Third: Elizabeth Busche
- Second: Anna Bauman
- Lead: Sonja Bauman
- Finalist: Minnesota 1 (Miranda Solem)

The 2012 United States Junior Curling Championships were held from January 28 to February 4 at the Madison Curling Club in McFarland, Wisconsin. The winners, the teams skipped by Stephen Dropkin and Cory Christensen, represented the United States at the 2012 World Junior Curling Championships in Östersund, Sweden.

== Men ==
=== Teams ===
The teams are listed as follows:

Skip	Third	Second	Lead	Alternate	Locale
Nathaniel Clark	Will Cousins	Justin Hoge	Donald Mackintosh		Nashua, New Hampshire
Stephen Dropkin	Korey Dropkin	Thomas Howell	Derek Corbett	Cameron Ross	Southborough, Massachusetts
Ryan Flippo	Quinn Evenson	Oliver Halvarson	Brandon Hall		Fairbanks, Alaska
Evan Jensen	Zachary Taylor	Ron Bichler	Kelly Traska	Ben Miller	Medford, Wisconsin
Kyle Kakela	Ryan Westby	Spencer Tuskowski	Kyson Smith	Paul Tharalson	Rolla, North Dakota
Adam Kitchens	Brandon Myhre	Alex Kitchens	Nathan Myhre		Devils Lake, North Dakota
Ethan Meyers	Trevor Host	Mark Fenner	Alex Fenson		Duluth, Minnesota
Blake Morton	Marcus Fonger	Tommy Jucsczyk	Calvin Weber	Chris Bond	McFarland, Wisconsin
Jake Vukich	Evan McAuley	Luc Violette	Kyle Lorvick		(Washington (state)) Seattle, Washington
Tony Wright	Will Howleson	Jesse Jaeger	Wesley Leskell	Noah Fiskness	Duluth, Minnesota

=== Round Robin Standings ===
Final Round Robin Standings

Key
Teams to Playoffs
Teams to Tiebreaker

Team	W	L
Massachusetts (Dropkin)	9	0
Wisconsin 2 (Morton)	6	3
Wisconsin 1 (Jensen)	5	4
North Dakota 2 (Kakela)	5	4
Minnesota 1 (Meyers)	5	4
New Hampshire (Clark)	4	5
(Washington (state)) Washington (Vukich)	4	5
Minnesota 2 (Wright)	3	6
Alaska (Flippo)	2	7
North Dakota 1 (Kitchens)	2	7

=== Round Robin Results ===
All times listed in Central Standard Time (UTC-6).

==== Draw 1 ====
Sunday, January 29, 8:00 am

Sheet 2	1	2	3	4	5	6	7	8	9	10	Final
(Washington (state)) Washington	0	0	1	0	0	1	0	1	X	X	3
Wisconsin 2	2	2	0	0	2	0	4	0	X	X	10

Sheet 3	1	2	3	4	5	6	7	8	9	10	Final
Wisconsin 1	3	0	1	0	1	0	1	0	1	0	7
New Hampshire	0	1	0	3	0	1	0	2	0	1	8

Sheet 4	1	2	3	4	5	6	7	8	9	10	Final
Minnesota 1	0	0	0	2	1	1	1	0	2	2	9
North Dakota 2	0	2	1	0	0	0	0	3	0	0	6

Sheet 5	1	2	3	4	5	6	7	8	9	10	Final
Massachusetts	0	2	0	2	4	0	4	X	X	X	12
Alaska	1	0	1	0	0	2	0	X	X	X	4

Sheet 6	1	2	3	4	5	6	7	8	9	10	Final
Minnesota 2	1	0	0	2	0	1	1	0	0	2	7
North Dakota 1	0	2	1	0	2	0	0	0	1	0	6

==== Draw 3 ====
Sunday, January 29, 4:00 pm

Sheet 2	1	2	3	4	5	6	7	8	9	10	11	Final
North Dakota 1	0	1	0	1	1	1	0	0	0	1	0	5
North Dakota 2	1	0	2	0	0	0	1	0	1	0	1	6

Sheet 3	1	2	3	4	5	6	7	8	9	10	Final
Minnesota 2	1	0	1	0	1	1	0	2	0	X	6
Wisconsin 2	0	1	0	2	0	0	1	0	1	X	5

Sheet 4	1	2	3	4	5	6	7	8	9	10	Final
Alaska	0	0	1	0	0	3	2	0	1	X	7
New Hampshire	0	0	0	1	0	0	0	2	0	X	3

Sheet 5	1	2	3	4	5	6	7	8	9	10	Final
Minnesota 1	0	0	1	0	2	0	0	2	2	X	7
Wisconsin 1	1	1	0	2	0	1	4	0	0	X	9

Sheet 6	1	2	3	4	5	6	7	8	9	10	Final
Massachusetts	2	0	1	1	2	1	0	0	1	X	8
(Washington (state)) Washington	0	2	0	0	0	0	1	1	0	X	4

==== Draw 5 ====
Monday, January 30, 8:00 am

Sheet 2	1	2	3	4	5	6	7	8	9	10	Final
Minnesota 1	0	0	1	0	2	0	1	0	1	2	7
New Hampshire	0	0	0	1	0	1	0	4	0	0	6

Sheet 3	1	2	3	4	5	6	7	8	9	10	Final
North Dakota 2	1	0	0	0	1	0	0	0	X	X	2
Massachusetts	0	1	1	1	0	2	3	2	X	X	10

Sheet 4	1	2	3	4	5	6	7	8	9	10	Final
Wisconsin 1	0	0	0	1	1	1	1	2	0	X	6
North Dakota 1	0	1	1	0	0	0	0	0	2	X	4

Sheet 5	1	2	3	4	5	6	7	8	9	10	Final
Minnesota 2	0	0	1	0	1	0	0	1	1	X	4
(Washington (state)) Washington	2	0	0	1	0	1	1	0	0	X	5

Sheet 6	1	2	3	4	5	6	7	8	9	10	Final
Alaska	0	1	0	1	0	1	0	1	0	0	4
Wisconsin 2	1	0	0	0	2	0	1	0	2	1	7

==== Draw 7 ====
Monday, January 30, 4:00 pm

Sheet 2	1	2	3	4	5	6	7	8	9	10	Final
Wisconsin 2	0	1	1	0	0	0	1	0	2	1	6
Wisconsin 1	1	0	0	1	0	0	0	2	0	0	4

Sheet 3	1	2	3	4	5	6	7	8	9	10	Final
(Washington (state)) Washington	0	2	0	0	1	0	0	2	1	0	6
Alaska	1	0	1	1	0	2	1	0	0	1	7

Sheet 4	1	2	3	4	5	6	7	8	9	10	Final
Minnesota 2	0	0	0	2	0	0	X	X	X	X	2
Massachusetts	1	1	3	0	2	1	X	X	X	X	8

Sheet 5	1	2	3	4	5	6	7	8	9	10	Final
North Dakota 2	2	0	0	1	0	0	0	1	1	X	5
New Hampshire	0	2	1	0	1	2	1	0	0	X	7

Sheet 6	1	2	3	4	5	6	7	8	9	10	Final
North Dakota 1	0	1	0	1	0	1	0	2	1	2	8
Minnesota 1	2	0	1	0	1	0	2	0	0	0	6

==== Draw 9 ====
Tuesday, January 31, 9:00 am

Sheet 2	1	2	3	4	5	6	7	8	9	10	Final
Alaska	0	0	0	0	1	0	2	1	0	X	4
Minnesota 1	0	1	0	2	0	3	0	0	0	X	6

Sheet 3	1	2	3	4	5	6	7	8	9	10	Final
Massachusetts	0	4	0	0	6	0	1	0	X	X	11
Wisconsin 1	1	0	0	2	0	1	0	1	X	X	5

Sheet 4	1	2	3	4	5	6	7	8	9	10	Final
North Dakota 2	0	3	0	1	0	2	0	2	4	X	12
(Washington (state)) Washington	2	0	2	0	1	0	1	0	0	X	6

Sheet 5	1	2	3	4	5	6	7	8	9	10	Final
Wisconsin 2	2	2	0	5	0	1	0	1	X	X	11
North Dakota 1	0	0	1	0	2	0	1	0	X	X	4

Sheet 6	1	2	3	4	5	6	7	8	9	10	Final
New Hampshire	1	0	0	3	0	2	0	1	0	X	7
Minnesota 2	0	1	1	0	1	0	1	0	1	X	5

==== Draw 11 ====
Tuesday, January 31, 7:00 pm

Sheet 2	1	2	3	4	5	6	7	8	9	10	Final
North Dakota 2	2	0	0	1	2	0	0	1	0	0	6
Minnesota 2	0	1	0	0	0	1	1	0	1	1	5

Sheet 3	1	2	3	4	5	6	7	8	9	10	Final
North Dakota 1	1	0	2	0	1	0	0	0	0	0	4
(Washington (state)) Washington	0	2	0	1	0	0	3	0	1	1	8

Sheet 4	1	2	3	4	5	6	7	8	9	10	Final
Wisconsin 2	2	0	0	4	0	1	0	3	X	X	10
Minnesota 1	0	0	1	0	1	0	2	0	X	X	4

Sheet 5	1	2	3	4	5	6	7	8	9	10	Final
New Hampshire	0	4	0	1	0	1	0	0	0	X	6
Massachusetts	1	0	2	0	2	0	2	0	2	X	9

Sheet 6	1	2	3	4	5	6	7	8	9	10	Final
Wisconsin 1	0	0	1	2	1	0	1	0	0	1	6
Alaska	2	0	0	0	0	1	0	2	0	0	5

==== Draw 13 ====
Wednesday, February 1, 12:00 pm

Sheet 2	1	2	3	4	5	6	7	8	9	10	11	Final
New Hampshire	1	0	0	0	2	0	0	0	1	1	0	5
(Washington (state)) Washington	0	0	1	0	0	2	0	2	0	0	1	6

Sheet 3	1	2	3	4	5	6	7	8	9	10	11	Final
Wisconsin 2	0	1	0	0	2	0	0	0	2	0	0	5
North Dakota 2	1	0	1	0	0	1	1	0	0	1	1	6

Sheet 4	1	2	3	4	5	6	7	8	9	10	Final
North Dakota 1	0	2	0	0	1	1	0	2	1	X	7
Alaska	0	0	0	1	0	0	1	0	0	X	2

Sheet 5	1	2	3	4	5	6	7	8	9	10	Final
Wisconsin 1	1	0	1	0	2	2	0	3	1	X	10
Minnesota 2	0	2	0	3	0	0	1	0	0	X	6

Sheet 6	1	2	3	4	5	6	7	8	9	10	Final
Minnesota 1	1	0	1	0	0	1	0	0	1	1	5
Massachusetts	0	2	0	2	0	0	1	1	0	0	6

==== Draw 15 ====
Wednesday, February 1, 8:00 pm

Sheet 2	1	2	3	4	5	6	7	8	9	10	Final
Massachusetts	0	2	0	1	3	0	2	0	0	X	8
North Dakota 1	0	0	1	0	0	1	0	2	1	X	5

Sheet 3	1	2	3	4	5	6	7	8	9	10	Final
Minnesota 1	5	1	0	1	0	0	3	X	X	X	10
Minnesota 2	0	0	2	0	0	1	0	X	X	X	3

Sheet 4	1	2	3	4	5	6	7	8	9	10	Final
(Washington (state)) Washington	3	0	0	0	2	0	1	0	3	X	9
Wisconsin 1	0	0	1	1	0	2	0	1	0	X	5

Sheet 5	1	2	3	4	5	6	7	8	9	10	11	Final
Alaska	0	0	0	2	0	0	1	0	0	2	0	5
North Dakota 2	0	0	2	0	0	1	0	1	1	0	1	6

Sheet 6	1	2	3	4	5	6	7	8	9	10	Final
Wisconsin 2	0	0	2	2	2	0	6	X	X	X	12
New Hampshire	0	0	0	0	0	2	0	X	X	X	2

==== Draw 17 ====
Thursday, February 2, 12:00 pm

Sheet 2	1	2	3	4	5	6	7	8	9	10	Final
Minnesota 2	3	0	0	2	0	2	0	0	1	3	11
Alaska	0	1	3	0	2	0	2	1	0	0	9

Sheet 3	1	2	3	4	5	6	7	8	9	10	Final
New Hampshire	0	1	0	2	0	3	1	3	1	X	11
North Dakota 1	2	0	2	0	1	0	0	0	0	X	5

Sheet 4	1	2	3	4	5	6	7	8	9	10	Final
Massachusetts	0	3	0	1	1	1	0	2	0	1	9
Wisconsin 2	1	0	2	0	0	0	2	0	1	0	6

Sheet 5	1	2	3	4	5	6	7	8	9	10	11	Final
(Washington (state)) Washington	1	1	0	0	1	0	0	1	2	0	0	6
Minnesota 1	0	0	2	0	0	1	0	0	0	3	1	7

Sheet 6	1	2	3	4	5	6	7	8	9	10	Final
North Dakota 2	0	0	1	0	1	0	0	X	X	X	2
Wisconsin 1	0	1	0	2	0	3	3	X	X	X	9

=== Tiebreaker ===
Thursday, February 2, 8:00 pm

Team	1	2	3	4	5	6	7	8	9	10	Final
Minnesota 1	1	0	2	0	1	0	0	0	0	0	4
North Dakota 2	0	2	0	2	0	1	0	1	0	1	7

=== Playoffs ===
Page playoff system
1	Massachusetts	6
2	Wisconsin 2	2
3	Wisconsin 1	5
4	North Dakota 2	6

Semifinal
2	Wisconsin 2	6
4	North Dakota 2	1

Final
1	Massachusetts	9
2	Wisconsin 2	8

==== 1 vs. 2 Game ====
Friday, February 3, 2:00 pm

Team	1	2	3	4	5	6	7	8	9	10	Final
Massachusetts	1	0	1	1	1	0	2	0	X	X	6
Wisconsin 2	0	0	0	0	0	1	0	1	X	X	2

==== 3 vs. 4 Game ====
Friday, February 3, 2:00 pm

Team	1	2	3	4	5	6	7	8	9	10	Final
Wisconsin 1	0	0	0	2	0	0	2	1	0	0	5
North Dakota 2	1	1	0	0	2	1	0	0	0	1	6

==== Semifinal ====
Friday, February 3, 7:00 pm

Team	1	2	3	4	5	6	7	8	9	10	Final
Wisconsin 2	0	1	0	0	2	1	0	2	X	X	6
North Dakota 2	0	0	0	0	0	0	1	0	X	X	1

==== Final ====
Saturday, February 4, 10:00 am

Team	1	2	3	4	5	6	7	8	9	10	Final
Massachusetts	4	0	4	0	0	0	0	1	0	0	9
Wisconsin 2	0	1	0	1	1	1	1	0	2	1	8

== Women ==
=== Teams ===
The teams are listed as follows:

Skip	Third	Second	Lead	Alternate	Locale
Cory Christensen	Elizabeth Busche	Anna Bauman	Sonja Bauman		Duluth, Minnesota
Rebecca Andrew (fourth)	Hannah Ely (skip)	Abigail Morrison	Rebecca Vanarsdall		(New York (state)) Penfield, New York
Jenna Haag	Chloe Pahl	Grace Gabower	Erin Wallace	Kendall Moulton	Milton, Wisconsin
Rebecca Hamilton	Tara Peterson	Karlie Koenig	Sophie Brorson		McFarland, Wisconsin
Abigayle Lindgren	Katie Sigurdson	Emily Lindgren	Madeleine Shaft	Kelsey Colwell	Grand Forks, North Dakota
Vicky Persinger	Tina Persinger	Kaitlin Fowler	Becky Hill		Fairbanks, Alaska
Miranda Solem	Mackenzie Lank	Julie Lilla	Chelsea Solem		Cohasset, Minnesota
Shelby Sweet	Nikole Lorvick	Christine Donnan	Kate Lawson	Cori Tomlinson	(Washington (state)) Everett, Washington
Rachel Tharalson	Anna Hopkins	Jesa Legacie	Emily Brekke		Hoople, North Dakota
Emily Walker	Emma Annand	Brandi Arsenault	Kathryn Sullivan	Laura Murphy	Sudbury, Massachusetts

=== Round Robin Standings ===
Final Round Robin Standings

Key
Teams to Playoffs

Team	W	L
Wisconsin 2 (Hamilton)	8	1
Minnesota 2 (Christensen)	7	2
(New York (state)) New York (Ely)	6	3
Minnesota 1 (Solem)	6	3
Wisconsin 1 (Haag)	5	4
Alaska (Persinger)	5	4
North Dakota 2 (Lindgren)	4	5
North Dakota 1 (Tharalson)	2	7
(Washington (state)) Washington (Sweet)	1	8
Massachusetts (Walker)	1	8

=== Round Robin Results ===
All times listed in Central Standard Time (UTC-6).

==== Draw 2 ====
Sunday, January 29, 12:00 pm

Sheet 2	1	2	3	4	5	6	7	8	9	10	Final
North Dakota 2	0	0	1	0	1	0	1	0	1	0	4
Minnesota 1	1	1	0	1	0	2	0	1	0	1	7

Sheet 3	1	2	3	4	5	6	7	8	9	10	Final
Alaska	0	0	3	0	1	0	3	0	3	X	10
North Dakota 1	1	0	0	0	0	1	0	2	0	X	4

Sheet 4	1	2	3	4	5	6	7	8	9	10	Final
Minnesota 2	0	1	0	1	0	3	0	0	0	X	5
(New York (state)) New York	3	0	1	0	2	0	0	2	1	X	9

Sheet 5	1	2	3	4	5	6	7	8	9	10	Final
Wisconsin 2	3	1	3	0	2	0	2	1	X	X	12
(Washington (state)) Washington	0	0	0	1	0	1	0	0	X	X	2

Sheet 6	1	2	3	4	5	6	7	8	9	10	Final
Massachusetts	1	1	0	0	0	0	1	0	X	X	3
Wisconsin 1	0	0	2	2	2	2	0	4	X	X	12

==== Draw 4 ====
Sunday, January 29, 8:00 pm

Sheet 2	1	2	3	4	5	6	7	8	9	10	11	Final
Wisconsin 1	0	2	0	2	1	0	0	0	0	2	0	7
(New York (state)) New York	4	0	1	0	0	0	0	1	1	0	1	8

Sheet 3	1	2	3	4	5	6	7	8	9	10	Final
Massachusetts	0	1	0	0	1	0	2	1	0	0	5
Minnesota 1	3	0	1	1	0	1	0	0	1	2	9

Sheet 4	1	2	3	4	5	6	7	8	9	10	Final
(Washington (state)) Washington	0	0	0	0	1	1	1	0	X	X	3
North Dakota 1	3	2	1	1	0	0	0	5	X	X	12

Sheet 5	1	2	3	4	5	6	7	8	9	10	Final
Minnesota 2	2	1	0	2	0	0	2	2	1	X	10
Alaska	0	0	2	0	2	1	0	0	0	X	5

Sheet 6	1	2	3	4	5	6	7	8	9	10	Final
Wisconsin 2	0	2	2	0	6	1	2	X	X	X	13
North Dakota 2	2	0	0	1	0	0	0	X	X	X	3

==== Draw 6 ====
Monday, January 30, 12:00 pm

Sheet 2	1	2	3	4	5	6	7	8	9	10	Final
Minnesota 2	1	1	1	0	1	0	3	2	4	X	13
North Dakota 1	0	0	0	2	0	2	0	0	0	X	4

Sheet 3	1	2	3	4	5	6	7	8	9	10	Final
(New York (state)) New York	0	1	0	0	1	0	0	0	X	X	2
Wisconsin 2	2	0	1	0	0	2	2	2	X	X	9

Sheet 4	1	2	3	4	5	6	7	8	9	10	Final
Alaska	0	0	0	0	3	0	0	0	1	0	4
Wisconsin 1	0	0	0	1	0	3	0	0	0	2	6

Sheet 5	1	2	3	4	5	6	7	8	9	10	11	Final
Massachusetts	0	2	0	0	3	1	0	1	0	1	0	8
North Dakota 2	1	0	1	1	0	0	2	0	3	0	1	9

Sheet 6	1	2	3	4	5	6	7	8	9	10	Final
(Washington (state)) Washington	1	0	1	0	0	0	0	1	0	X	3
Minnesota 1	0	2	0	3	2	1	0	0	1	X	9

==== Draw 8 ====
Monday, January 30, 8:00 pm

Sheet 2	1	2	3	4	5	6	7	8	9	10	Final
Minnesota 1	2	2	0	0	0	1	0	1	1	X	7
Alaska	0	0	3	2	2	0	1	0	0	X	8

Sheet 3	1	2	3	4	5	6	7	8	9	10	Final
North Dakota 2	2	1	0	1	0	1	1	0	2	X	8
(Washington (state)) Washington	0	0	2	0	0	0	0	2	0	X	4

Sheet 4	1	2	3	4	5	6	7	8	9	10	Final
Massachusetts	0	1	0	0	0	1	0	X	X	X	2
Wisconsin 2	1	0	2	1	3	0	2	X	X	X	9

Sheet 5	1	2	3	4	5	6	7	8	9	10	Final
(New York (state)) New York	2	0	1	0	2	2	0	0	1	0	8
North Dakota 1	0	2	0	3	0	0	0	1	0	1	7

Sheet 6	1	2	3	4	5	6	7	8	9	10	Final
Wisconsin 1	0	3	0	0	1	0	1	2	0	0	7
Minnesota 2	1	0	2	2	0	2	0	0	2	3	12

==== Draw 10 ====
Tuesday, January 31, 2:00 pm

Sheet 2	1	2	3	4	5	6	7	8	9	10	Final
(Washington (state)) Washington	0	1	0	0	0	X	X	X	X	X	1
Minnesota 2	2	0	2	1	4	X	X	X	X	X	9

Sheet 3	1	2	3	4	5	6	7	8	9	10	Final
Wisconsin 2	0	0	1	0	2	1	1	0	3	X	8
Alaska	1	1	0	1	0	0	0	1	0	X	4

Sheet 4	1	2	3	4	5	6	7	8	9	10	Final
(New York (state)) New York	2	0	1	0	1	0	0	0	1	0	5
North Dakota 2	0	2	0	1	0	0	0	2	0	2	7

Sheet 5	1	2	3	4	5	6	7	8	9	10	Final
Minnesota 1	3	0	0	1	0	3	0	1	0	X	8
Wisconsin 1	0	1	0	0	1	0	2	0	1	X	5

Sheet 6	1	2	3	4	5	6	7	8	9	10	11	Final
North Dakota 1	1	0	1	0	0	1	0	4	0	1	0	8
Massachusetts	0	2	0	1	2	0	1	0	2	0	1	9

==== Draw 12 ====
Wednesday, February 1, 8:00 am

Sheet 2	1	2	3	4	5	6	7	8	9	10	Final
(New York (state)) New York	0	3	0	2	0	1	0	1	0	1	8
Massachusetts	2	0	1	0	1	0	1	0	2	0	7

Sheet 3	1	2	3	4	5	6	7	8	9	10	Final
Wisconsin 1	1	0	1	1	2	0	0	1	0	2	8
North Dakota 2	0	3	0	0	0	0	2	0	1	0	6

Sheet 4	1	2	3	4	5	6	7	8	9	10	Final
Minnesota 1	0	0	0	0	2	0	1	1	1	X	5
Minnesota 2	3	1	1	1	0	1	0	0	0	X	7

Sheet 5	1	2	3	4	5	6	7	8	9	10	Final
North Dakota 1	0	0	2	0	1	0	0	X	X	X	3
Wisconsin 2	3	1	0	2	0	3	1	X	X	X	10

Sheet 6	1	2	3	4	5	6	7	8	9	10	Final
Alaska	2	0	1	0	4	0	1	0	2	X	10
(Washington (state)) Washington	0	1	0	1	0	1	0	1	0	X	4

==== Draw 14 ====
Wednesday, February 1, 4:00 pm

Sheet 2	1	2	3	4	5	6	7	8	9	10	Final
North Dakota 1	0	1	0	1	1	0	0	0	1	0	4
North Dakota 2	1	0	1	0	0	1	1	2	0	2	8

Sheet 3	1	2	3	4	5	6	7	8	9	10	Final
Minnesota 1	0	1	0	0	1	0	1	2	0	0	5
(New York (state)) New York	0	0	0	1	0	1	0	0	1	1	4

Sheet 4	1	2	3	4	5	6	7	8	9	10	Final
Wisconsin 1	1	3	0	0	1	1	0	1	0	X	7
(Washington (state)) Washington	0	0	2	1	0	0	1	0	1	X	5

Sheet 5	1	2	3	4	5	6	7	8	9	10	Final
Alaska	0	1	1	1	1	1	0	3	0	X	8
Massachusetts	1	0	0	0	0	0	1	0	1	X	3

Sheet 6	1	2	3	4	5	6	7	8	9	10	Final
Minnesota 2	0	1	0	0	1	1	0	X	X	X	3
Wisconsin 2	4	0	3	1	0	0	3	X	X	X	11

==== Draw 16 ====
Thursday, February 2, 8:00 am

Sheet 2	1	2	3	4	5	6	7	8	9	10	Final
Wisconsin 2	0	1	1	0	0	1	1	2	1	X	7
Wisconsin 1	1	0	0	0	2	0	0	0	0	X	3

Sheet 3	1	2	3	4	5	6	7	8	9	10	Final
Minnesota 2	3	0	0	1	4	3	0	X	X	X	11
Massachusetts	0	0	1	0	0	0	1	X	X	X	2

Sheet 4	1	2	3	4	5	6	7	8	9	10	Final
North Dakota 2	0	1	0	2	2	0	1	1	1	0	8
Alaska	3	0	2	0	0	3	0	0	0	2	10

Sheet 5	1	2	3	4	5	6	7	8	9	10	Final
(Washington (state)) Washington	3	0	0	1	0	0	X	X	X	X	4
(New York (state)) New York	0	4	3	0	3	3	X	X	X	X	13

Sheet 6	1	2	3	4	5	6	7	8	9	10	11	Final
Minnesota 1	2	0	0	0	0	2	0	1	1	1	0	7
North Dakota 1	0	1	2	2	1	0	1	0	0	0	1	8

==== Draw 18 ====
Thursday, February 2, 4:00 pm

Sheet 2	1	2	3	4	5	6	7	8	9	10	Final
Massachusetts	0	0	0	1	0	0	1	0	X	X	2
(Washington (state)) Washington	1	1	3	0	2	1	0	2	X	X	10

Sheet 3	1	2	3	4	5	6	7	8	9	10	Final
North Dakota 1	1	1	0	0	1	0	1	0	3	0	7
Wisconsin 1	0	0	2	1	0	2	0	2	0	1	8

Sheet 4	1	2	3	4	5	6	7	8	9	10	11	Final
Wisconsin 2	0	0	2	2	0	2	0	0	1	0	0	7
Minnesota 1	2	0	0	0	1	0	1	1	0	2	1	8

Sheet 5	1	2	3	4	5	6	7	8	9	10	Final
North Dakota 2	0	2	0	5	0	3	0	1	0	0	11
Minnesota 2	1	0	2	0	2	0	3	0	2	2	12

Sheet 6	1	2	3	4	5	6	7	8	9	10	Final
(New York (state)) New York	0	0	0	1	0	1	1	0	0	2	5
Alaska	0	0	2	0	1	0	0	1	0	0	4

=== Playoffs ===
Page playoff system
1	Wisconsin 2	7
2	Minnesota 2	8
3	Minnesota 1	6
4	(New York (state)) New York	2

Semifinal
1	Wisconsin 2	6
3	Minnesota 1	8

Final
2	Minnesota 2	10
3	Minnesota 1	8

==== 1 vs. 2 Game ====
Friday, February 3, 2:00 pm

Team	1	2	3	4	5	6	7	8	9	10	Final
Wisconsin 2	0	3	0	0	1	0	0	0	3	0	7
Minnesota 2	0	0	1	1	0	2	0	3	0	1	8

==== 3 vs. 4 Game ====
Friday, February 3, 2:00 pm

Team	1	2	3	4	5	6	7	8	9	10	Final
Minnesota 1	1	0	0	0	1	2	0	1	1	X	6
(New York (state)) New York	0	0	0	1	0	0	1	0	0	X	2

==== Semifinal ====
Friday, February 3, 7:00 pm

Team	1	2	3	4	5	6	7	8	9	10	Final
Wisconsin 2	2	1	1	0	1	0	0	0	1	X	6
Minnesota 1	0	0	0	1	0	2	2	3	0	X	8

==== Final ====
Saturday, February 4, 2:00 pm

Team	1	2	3	4	5	6	7	8	9	10	Final
Minnesota 2	1	0	2	0	0	1	0	2	2	2	10
Minnesota 1	0	1	0	4	2	0	1	0	0	0	8
