= 2002 Continental Cup of Curling =

2002 Keg Continental Cup of Curling
- Host city: Regina, Saskatchewan
- Arena: Agridome
- Dates: November 7–10
- Winner: Team North America
Score Breakdown
Discipline	NA	World
Mixed Doubles	12	24
Women's Team	24	12
Men's Team	24	12
Singles	8	24
Women's Skins	66	64
Men's Skins	73	57
Total	207	193

The Keg 2002 Continental Cup of Curling was held at the Agridome in Regina, Saskatchewan November 7–10. It was the very first edition of the event. North America defeated their European counterparts 207-193. Despite the fact that all the teams were from Europe, North America's opposition was known as Team World. Later events would name the team "Team Europe" until 2008, when "Team World" was re-adopted after the inclusion of Chinese teams.

== Teams ==
=== World ===
- (Switzerland) Luzia Ebnöther, Carmen Küng, Tanya Frei, Nadia Röthlisberger
- (Sweden) Elisabet Gustafson, Katarina Nyberg, Louise Marmont, Elisabeth Persson
- (Sweden) Peja Lindholm, Tomas Nordin, Magnus Swartling, Peter Narup
- (Scotland) Hammy McMillan, Norman Brown, Hugh Aitken, Roger McIntyre
- (Scotland) Rhona Martin, Debbie Knox, Fiona MacDonald, Janice Rankin
- (Norway) Pål Trulsen, Lars Vågberg, Flemming Davanger, Bent Ånund Ramsfjell

=== North America ===
- (Canada) David Nedohin, Randy Ferbey, Scott Pfeifer, Marcel Rocque
- (Canada) Colleen Jones, Kim Kelly, Mary-Anne Waye, Nancy Delahunt
- (United States) Patti Lank, Erika Brown, Nicole Joraanstad, Natalie Nicholson
- (Canada) Kelley Law, Julie Skinner, Georgina Wheatcroft, Diane Dezura
- (Canada) Kevin Martin, Don Walchuk, Carter Rycroft, Don Bartlett
- (United States) Paul Pustovar, Mike Fraboni, Geoff Goodland, Richard Maskel

== Mixed doubles ==
(Each game worth six points)

- World (Vågberg/Ebnöther) 9-6 North America (Walchuk/Law)
- World (Nordin/Gustafson) 7-5 North America (Ferbey/Jones)
- World (Brown/R. Martin) 6-2 North America (Fraboni/Lank)
- World (Lindholm/Nyberg) 6-1 North America (K. Martin/Skinner)
- North America (Pustovar/E. Brown) 5-4 World (McMillan/Knox)
- North America (Nedohin/Kelly) 9-2 World (Trulsen/Küng)

World wins 24-12

== Women's team ==
(Each game worth six points)

- World (R. Martin) 9-2 North America (Law)
- North America (Lank) 8-4 World (Gustafson)
- North America (Jones) 5-2 World (Ebnöther)
- North America (Lank) 8-6 World (Ebnöther)
- North America (Jones) 5-4 World (Gustafson)
- World (R. Martin) 7-3 North America (Law)

North America wins 24-12

== Men's team ==
(Each game worth six points)

- North America (Pustovar) 8-4 World (McMillan)
- World (Lindholm) 8-4 North America (Ferbey)
- North America (K. Martin) 6-5 World (Trulsen)
- World (Lindholm) 7-6 North America (Pustovar)
- North America (Ferbey) 8-3 World (Trulsen)
- North America (K. Martin) 4-2 World (McMillan)

North America wins 24-12

== Singles ==
(Each game worth two points, eight bonus points awarded to top aggregate score)

- World (Nyberg) 24-12 North America (Waye)
- World (MacDonald) 17-14 North America (E. Brown)
- North America (Wheatcroft) 14-10 World (Frei)
- North America (Pfeifer) 22-19 World (Narup)
- North America (Goodland) 20-13 World (McIntyre)
- World (Ramsfjell) 16-15 North America (Walchuk)
- World (Knox) 17-11 North America (Jones)
- World (Küng) 19-15 North America (Lank)
- World (Gustafson) 20-15 North America (Law)
- North America (K. Martin) 27-13 World (Swartling)
- World (Aitken) 20-17 North America (Pustovar)
- World (Davanger) 22-21 North America (Nedohin)

World wins 24-8

== Women's skins ==
Values (points)	2	2	3	3	3	4	6	7	30
Team	1	2	3	4	5	6	7	8	Total
World (Ebnöther)	X	X	X	X	X	X	X	X	30
North America (Law) 🔨									0

Values (points)	2	2	4	4	5	6	7	10	40
Team	1	2	3	4	5	6	7	8	Total
World (R. Martin) 🔨				X	X	X			15
North America (Lank)	X	X	X				X	X	25

Values (points)	4	4	6	6	7	9	11	13	60
Team	1	2	3	4	5	6	7	8	Total
World (Gustafson)	X	X					X		19
North America (Jones) 🔨			X	X	X	X		X	41

North America wins 66–64

== Men's skins ==
Values (points)	2	2	3	3	3	4	6	7	30
Team	1	2	3	4	5	6	7	8	Total
World (McMillan) 🔨	X	X	X	X	X	X	X	X	30
North America (Pustovar)									0

Values (points)	2	2	4	4	5	6	7	10	40
Team	1	2	3	4	5	6	7	8	Total
World (Trulsen)		X	X	X					10
North America (Ferbey) 🔨	X				X	X	X	X	30

Values (points)	4	4	6	6	7	9	11	13	60
Team	1	2	3	4	5	6	7	8	Total
World (Lindholm) 🔨		X	X		X				17
North America (K. Martin)	X			X		X	X	X	43

North America wins 73–57

North America wins aggregate 207–193
