= Stefan Holmén =

Swedish male curler

- Curler ♂
- Born: 5 December 1967 (age 58); Sigtuna

Team
- Curling club: Karlstads CK, Karlstad

Curling career
- Member Association: Sweden
- World Championship: 1 (1991)
- Olympic: 1 (1992) (demo)
Medal record
Curling

Lars Erik Stefan Holmén (born 5 December 1967) is a Swedish curler.

He participated in the demonstration curling event at the 1992 Winter Olympics, where the Swedish team finished in fifth place. He also competed for Sweden at 1991 World men's championship.

== Teams ==
Season	Skip	Third	Second	Lead	Alternate	Events
1990–91	Dan-Ola Eriksson	Sören Grahn	Jonas Sjölander	Stefan Holmén	Håkan Funk	WCC 1991 (6th)
1991–92	Dan-Ola Eriksson	Sören Grahn	Jonas Sjölander	Stefan Holmén	Håkan Funk	WOG 1992 (5th)
