= Martin Romang =

Swiss curler

- Curler ♂

Team
- Curling club: Lausanne-Olympique CC, Lausanne

Curling career
- Member Association: Switzerland
- World Championship: 3 (1999, 2000, 2002)
- European Championship: 1 (1999)
Medal record
Curling
World Championships
Bronze medal – third place	1999 Saint John
Swiss Men's Championship
Gold medal – first place	1999
Gold medal – first place	2001

Martin Romang is a Swiss curler.

He is a 1999 World Men's bronze medallist and a two-time Swiss men's champion (1999, 2001).

== Teams ==
Season	Skip	Third	Second	Lead	Alternate	Coach	Events
1996–97	Markus Eggler	Dominic Andres	Martin Romang	Philip Karnusian			
1998–99	Patrick Hürlimann	Dominic Andres	Martin Romang	Diego Perren	Patrik Lörtscher	Stephan Keiser	SMCC 1999 (gold); WCC 1999 (bronze)
1999–00	Patrick Hürlimann	Dominic Andres	Martin Romang	Diego Perren	Patrik Lörtscher	Stephan Keiser	ECC 1999 (4th); WCC 2000 (6th)
2000–01	Patrick Hürlimann	Dominic Andres	Martin Romang	Diego Perren	Patrik Lörtscher	Stephan Keiser	SMCC 2001 (gold)
2001–02	Patrick Hürlimann	Dominic Andres	Martin Romang	Diego Perren	Patrik Lörtscher	Stephan Keiser	WCC 2002 (5th)
