= Jonas Sjölander =

Swedish male curler

- Curler ♂
- Born: 12 August 1965 (age 61); Härnösand

Team
- Curling club: Härnösands CK, Härnösand, Karlstads CK, Karlstad

Curling career
- Member Association: Sweden
- World Championship: 1 (1991)
- Olympic: 2 (1988, 1992) (demo)
- Other appearances: World Junior Championships: 1 (1985)

Per Erik Jonas Sjölander (born 12 August 1965) is a Swedish curler.

He participated in the demonstration curling events at the 1988 Winter Olympics and 1992 Winter Olympics, where the Swedish team finished in fifth place both times.

== Teams ==
Season	Skip	Third	Second	Lead	Alternate	Events
1984–85	Dan-Ola Eriksson	Jonas Sjölander	Christer Nylund	Stig Pettersson		SJCC 1985 (gold); WJCC 1985 (5th)
1987–88	Dan-Ola Eriksson	Anders Thidholm	Jonas Sjölander	Christer Nylund	Sören Grahn	WOG 1988 (5th)
1990–91	Dan-Ola Eriksson	Sören Grahn	Jonas Sjölander	Stefan Holmén	Håkan Funk	WCC 1991 (6th)
1991–92	Dan-Ola Eriksson	Sören Grahn	Jonas Sjölander	Stefan Holmén	Håkan Funk	WOG 1992 (5th)
