= George Godfrey (curler) =

American curler

- Curler ♂
- Born: June 18, 1944 (age 82); Lodi, Wisconsin, U.S.

Team
- Curling club: Madison CC, Madison, Wisconsin

Curling career
- Member Association: United States
- World Championship: 3 (1982, 1986, 1991)
- Other appearances: World Senior Championships: 2 (2002, 2004)
Medal record
Curling
World Championships
Bronze medal – third place	1986 Toronto
Bronze medal – third place	1991 Winnipeg
United States Men's Championship
Gold medal – first place	1982 Brookline
Gold medal – first place	1986 Seattle
Gold medal – first place	1991 Utica
Silver medal – second place	1980 Bemidji
Silver medal – second place	1985 Mequon
Silver medal – second place	1987 Lake Placid
Silver medal – second place	1989 Detroit
Silver medal – second place	1992 Grafton
Bronze medal – third place	1988 St. Paul
Bronze medal – third place	1990 Superior
Bronze medal – third place	1994 Duluth
World Senior Championships
Gold medal – first place	2002 Bismarck
Silver medal – second place	2004 Gävle

George Godfrey (born June 18, 1944, in Lodi, Wisconsin, United States) is an American curler.

He is a 1986 and 1991 World Men's bronze medallist and a three times United States men's curling champion (1982, 1986, 1991).

== Awards ==
- United States Curling Hall of Fame: 2001

== Teams ==
Season	Skip	Third	Second	Lead	Alternate	Coach	Events
1979–80	Steve Brown	Ed Sheffield	George Godfrey	Vince Fitzgerald			
1981–82	Steve Brown	Ed Sheffield	Huns Gustrowsky	George Godfrey		Elgie Noble	USMCC 1982 (gold); WCC 1982 (9th)
1984–85	Steve Brown	Geoff Goodland	George Godfrey	Huns Gustrowsky			
1985–86	Steve Brown	Wally Henry	George Godfrey	Richard Maskel	Huns Gustrowsky		USMCC 1986 (gold); WCC 1986 (bronze)
1986–87	Steve Brown	Wally Henry	George Godfrey	Richard Maskel			
1987–88	Steve Brown	Wally Henry	George Godfrey	Richard Maskel			
1988–89	Steve Brown	Wally Henry	George Godfrey	Richard Maskel			
1990–91	Steve Brown	Paul Pustovar	George Godfrey	Wally Henry	Mike Fraboni		USMCC 1991 (gold); WCC 1991 (bronze)
1991–92	Steve Brown	Paul Pustovar	George Godfrey	Richard Maskel	Mike Fraboni		
1993–94	Paul Pustovar (fourth)	Steve Brown (skip)	George Godfrey	Richard Maskel			
2001–02	Larry Johnson	Stan Vinge	George Godfrey	Bill Kind	Steve Brown		USSCC 2002 (gold); WSCC 2002 (gold)
2003–04	Bill Kind	George Godfrey	Walter Erbach	Larry Sharp	Steve Brown		USSCC 2004 (gold); WSCC 2004 (silver)
2003–04	George Godfrey	Jeremy Roe	Patrick Roe	Mark Hartman	Paul Pustovar		
2004–05	George Godfrey	Bill Kind	Walter Erbach	Larry Sharp			
2005–06	Bill Kind	George Godfrey	Walter Erbach	Larry Sharp			
2006–07	Bill Kind	George Godfrey	Walter Erbach	Larry Sharp			
2008–09	Dwayne Jacobson	Tim Ebert	George Godfrey	Walter Erbach			
2010–11	George Godfrey	Tim Ebert	Walter Erbach	Richard Berling			

== Personal life ==
George Godfrey started curling in 1952, when he was 8 years old.

He graduated from University of Wisconsin-Platteville.
