= Mike Fraboni =

American male curler and coach

- Curler ♂
- Born: June 5, 1948 (age 78); Hibbing, Minnesota, U.S.

Team
- Curling club: Madison CC, Madison, Wisconsin

Curling career
- Member Association: United States
- World Championship: 2 (1991, 2002)
- Other appearances: World Senior Championships: 2 (2008, 2019)
Medal record
Curling
World Championships
Bronze medal – third place	1991 Winnipeg
United States Men's Championship
Gold medal – first place	1991 Utica
Gold medal – first place	2002 Eveleth
World Senior Championships
Bronze medal – third place	2008 Vierumäki

Mike Fraboni (born June 5, 1948, in Hibbing, Minnesota, United States) is an American curler.

He is a 1991 World Men's bronze medallist and a two time United States men's curling champion (1991, 2002).

He works at Madison Curling Club as a curling ice maker.

== Teams ==
=== Men's ===
Season	Skip	Third	Second	Lead	Alternate	Coach	Events
1990–91	Steve Brown	Paul Pustovar	George Godfrey	Wally Henry	Mike Fraboni		USMCC 1991 (gold); WCC 1991 (bronze)
1996–97	Mike Fraboni	Paul Hanke	?	Walter Erbach			
2001–02	Paul Pustovar	Mike Fraboni	Geoff Goodland	Richard Maskel	Dave Nelson (WCC)	Michael Liapis	USMCC 2002 (gold); WCC 2002 (4th)
2002–03	Paul Pustovar	Mike Fraboni	Geoff Goodland	Richard Maskel			CCC 2002 (gold)
2003–04	Paul Pustovar	Mike Fraboni	Geoff Goodland	Richard Maskel			
2007–08	David Russell	Bill Rhyme	Mark Swandby	David Carlson	Mike Fraboni		USSCC 2008 (gold); WSCC 2008 (bronze)
2011–12	Mike Fraboni	Bill Rhyme	Mark Swandby	David Russell			
2012–13	Mike Fraboni	Bill Rhyme	Mark Swandby	David Russell			
2013–14	Mike Fraboni	Bill Rhyme	Mark Swandby	David Russell			
2018–19	Geoff Goodland	Mike Fraboni	Pete Westberg	Dan Wiza	Todd Birr		USSCC 2019 (gold); WSCC 2019 (5th)

=== Mixed ===
Season	Skip	Third	Second	Lead	Events
1995	Mike Fraboni	Allison Pottinger	Mark Swandby	Toni Swandby	USMxCC 1995 (gold)
1998	Mike Fraboni	Allison Pottinger	Craig Brown	Tracy Sachtjen	USMxCC 1998 (gold)
