= Håkan Funk =

Swedish male curler and coach

- Curler ♂
- Born: 30 September 1962 (age 64); Falun

Team
- Curling club: Karlstads CK, Karlstad

Curling career
- Member Association: Sweden
- World Championship: 2 (1988, 1991)
- Olympic: 1 (1992) (demo)
Medal record
Curling

Jan Håkan Funk (born 30 September 1962 in Falun) is a Swedish curler.

He participated in the demonstration curling events at the 1992 Winter Olympics, where the Swedish team finished in fifth place. He also competed for Sweden at two World men's championships (1988, 1991).

== Teams ==
Season	Skip	Third	Second	Lead	Alternate	Events
1987–88	Sören Grahn	Henrik Holmberg	Per Axelsson	Håkan Funk		WCC 1988 (5th)
1990–91	Dan-Ola Eriksson	Sören Grahn	Jonas Sjölander	Stefan Holmén	Håkan Funk	WCC 1991 (6th)
1991–92	Dan-Ola Eriksson	Sören Grahn	Jonas Sjölander	Stefan Holmén	Håkan Funk	WOG 1992 (5th)
