= Elizabeth Busche =

American curler (1992–2012)

- Curler
- Born: September 12, 1992; Duluth, Minnesota, U.S.
- Died: May 3, 2012 (age 19)

Curling career
- Member Association: United States

Elizabeth Busche (September 12, 1992 – May 3, 2012) was an American curler from Duluth, Minnesota.

== Curling career ==
Busche started curling in 2001 but played third for Cory Christensen's junior team in 2011. They were Minnesota state runners-up in 2011 and 2012, thus representing "Minnesota 2" at the 2011 and 2012 United States Junior Curling Championships. The team won the 2012 Championship, qualifying them to represent the United States at the 2012 World Junior Curling Championships. The team finished last in the tournament with a 0–9 record.

In addition to her junior accolades, Busche was also a member of the 2011 Minnesota State Mixed championship team that finished 5th at the 2011 US Mixed Championship.

== Death ==
Busche died just two months after the 2012 World Juniors from a rare form of ovarian cancer.
