= Sören Grahn =

Swedish male curler and coach

- Curler ♂
- Born: 26 December 1962 (age 63); Nor, Karlstad

Team
- Curling club: Karlstads CK, Karlstad

Curling career
- Member Association: Sweden
- World Championship: 3 (1982, 1988, 1991)
- Olympic: 2 (1988, 1992) (demo)
- Other appearances: World Junior Championships: 3 (1979, 1982, 1983)
Medal record
Curling
World Junior Championships
Gold medal – first place	1982 Fredericton

Sören Grahn (born 26 December 1962) is a Swedish curler and curling coach.

He participated in the demonstration curling events at the 1988 Winter Olympics and 1992 Winter Olympics, where the Swedish team finished in fifth place both times.

== Personal life ==
Grahn has two children. He currently lives in Cortina d'Ampezzo.

== Teams ==
Season	Skip	Third	Second	Lead	Alternate	Events
1978–79	Tony Eng	Sören Grahn	Lars Grengmark	Anders Svennerstedt		SJCC 1979 (gold); WJCC 1979 (7th)
1981–82	Sören Grahn	Niclas Järund	Henrik Holmberg	Anders Svennerstedt		SJCC 1982 (gold); WJCC 1982 (gold)
1981–82	Sören Grahn	Connie Östlund	Niclas Järund	Tony Eng		WCC 1982 (4th)
1982–83	Sören Grahn	Niclas Järund	Henrik Holmberg	Anders Svennersted]		SJCC 1983 (gold); WJCC 1983 (7th)
1987–88	Dan-Ola Eriksson	Anders Thidholm	Jonas Sjölander	Christer Nylund	Sören Grahn	WOG 1988 (5th)
1987–88	Sören Grahn	Henrik Holmberg	Per Axelsson	Håkan Funk		WCC 1988 (5th)
1990–91	Dan-Ola Eriksson	Sören Grahn	Jonas Sjölander	Stefan Holmén	Håkan Funk	WCC 1991 (6th)
1991–92	Dan-Ola Eriksson	Sören Grahn	Jonas Sjölander	Stefan Holmén	Håkan Funk	WOG 1992 (5th)

== Record as a coach of national teams ==
Year	Tournament, event	National team	Place
2003	2003 World Women's Curling Championship	Norway (women)	4
2003	2003 European Curling Championships	Norway (women)	6
2004	2004 World Women's Curling Championship	Norway (women)	2nd place, silver medalist(s)
2005	2005 European Curling Championships	Norway (women)	4
2006	2006 Winter Olympics	Norway (women)	4
2008	2008 World Junior Curling Championships	Sweden (junior men)	2nd place, silver medalist(s)
2009	2009 Winter Universiade	Sweden (women)	6
2009	2009 Winter Universiade	Sweden (men)	1st place, gold medalist(s)
2009	2009 European Curling Championships	Sweden (men)	1st place, gold medalist(s)
2010	2010 Winter Olympics	Sweden (men)	4
2010	2010 European Curling Championships	Sweden (men)	6
2012	2012 European Curling Championships	Scotland (men)	7
2013	2013 World Men's Curling Championship	Scotland (men)	3rd place, bronze medalist(s)
2013	2013 European Curling Championships	Scotland (men)	3rd place, bronze medalist(s)
2014	2014 Winter Olympics	United Kingdom (men)	2nd place, silver medalist(s)
2015	2015 European Curling Championships	Russia (men)	7
2016	2016 World Men's Curling Championship	Russia (men)	10
2016	2016 European Curling Championships	Russia (men)	4
2017	2017 World Men's Curling Championship	Russia (men)	12
2017	2017 European Curling Championships	Italy (men)	8
2018	2018 Winter Olympics	Italy (men)	9
2018	2018 World Men's Curling Championship	Italy (men)	8
2018	2018 World Mixed Doubles Curling Championship	Italy (mixed double)	12
2018	2018 European Curling Championships	Italy (men)	3rd place, bronze medalist(s)
2018	2018 European Curling Championships	Italy (women)	10
2019	2019 World Mixed Doubles Curling Championship	Italy (mixed double)	18
2019	2019 Pacific-Asia Curling Championships	China (men)	3rd place, bronze medalist(s)
2019	2019 Pacific-Asia Curling Championships	China (women)	1st place, gold medalist(s)
2021	2021 World Men's Curling Championship	China (men)	14
2021	2021 World Women's Curling Championship	China (women)	10
