= Geoff Goodland =

American curler

- Curler ♂
- Born: December 22, 1955 (age 70); Portage, Wisconsin, U.S.

Team
- Curling club: Eau Claire CC, Eau Claire, Wisconsin

Curling career
- Member Association: United States
- World Championship: 1 (2002)
- Other appearances: World Senior Championships: 5 (2007, 2011, 2016, 2017, 2019)
Medal record
Curling
United States Men's Championship
| Gold medal – first place | 2002 Eveleth |
| Silver medal – second place | 1985 Mequon |
World Senior Championships
| Silver medal – second place | 2011 St. Paul |

Geoff Goodland (born December 22, 1955, in Portage, Wisconsin, United States) is an American curler.

At the national level, he is a 2002 United States men's curling champion and two-time United States mixed curling champion (1991, 1993). Also he is a five-time United States senior curling champion (2007, 2011, 2016, 2017, 2019).

== Awards ==
- 2011 United States Curling Association Team of the Year (with teammates Tim Solin, Pete Westberg, Ken Olson, and Philip DeVore)

== Teams ==
=== Men's ===
| Season | Skip | Third | Second | Lead | Alternate | Coach | Events |
|---|---|---|---|---|---|---|---|
| 1984–85 | Steve Brown | Geoff Goodland | George Godfrey | Huns Gustrowsky | | | |
| 2001–02 | Paul Pustovar | Mike Fraboni | Geoff Goodland | Richard Maskel | Dave Nelson (WCC) | Michael Liapis | USMCC 2002 (gold); WCC 2002 (4th) |
| 2002–03 | Paul Pustovar | Mike Fraboni | Geoff Goodland | Richard Maskel | | | CCC 2002 (gold) |
| 2003–04 | Paul Pustovar | Mike Fraboni | Geoff Goodland | Richard Maskel | | | |
| 2004–05 | Paul Pustovar | Greg Wilson | Geoff Goodland | Richard Maskel | | | |
| 2006–07 | Geoff Goodland | Stan Vinge | Wally Henry | Jim Wilson | | | USSCC 2007 (gold); WSCC 2007 (4th) |
| 2009–10 | Geoff Goodland | Tim Solin | Pete Westberg | Ken Olson | | | |
| 2010–11 | Geoff Goodland | Tim Solin | Pete Westberg | Ken Olson | | | USMCC 2011 (10th); USSCC 2011 (gold); WSCC 2011 (silver) |
| 2012–13 | Geoff Goodland | Tim Solin | Pete Westberg | Ken Olson | | | |
| 2013–14 | Geoff Goodland | Pete Westberg | Tim Solin | Cal Tillisch | | | USSCC 2014 (7th) |
| 2015–16 | Geoff Goodland | Pete Westberg | Tim Solin | Jeff Annis | Philip DeVore | | USSCC 2016 (gold); WSCC 2016 (5th) |
| 2016–17 | Mike Farbelow | Geoff Goodland | Pete Westberg | Tim Solin | Jeff Annis | | USSCC 2017 (gold); WSCC 2017 (13th) |
| 2018–19 | Geoff Goodland | Mike Fraboni | Pete Westberg | Dan Wiza | Todd Birr | | USSCC 2019 (gold); WSCC 2019 (5th) |

=== Mixed ===
| Season | Skip | Third | Second | Lead | Events |
|---|---|---|---|---|---|
| 1990–91 | Geoff Goodland | Kathy Baldwin | Cal Tillisch | Marcia Tillisch | USMxCC 1991 (gold) |
| 1992–93 | Geoff Goodland | Lori Mountford | Cal Tillisch | Marcia Tillisch | USMxCC 1993 (gold) |
