= 1985 World Junior Curling Championships =

- Host city: Perth, Scotland
- Dates: March 10–16
- Men's winner: Canada (5th title)
- Skip: Bob Ursel
- Third: Brent Mendella
- Second: Gerald Chick
- Lead: Mike Ursel
- Finalist: Switzerland (Christian Saager)

The 1985 World Junior Curling Championships were held from March 10 to 16 in Perth, Scotland for men's teams only.

== Teams ==
Country	Skip	Third	Second	Lead	Curling club
Canada	Bob Ursel	Brent Mendella	Gerald Chick	Mike Ursel	
Denmark	Ole Lehmann de Neergard	Lars Torbensen	Carsten Nyboe	Anders Søderberg	
France	Lionel Tournier	Frank Riom	Jean-Francois Delavay	Pascal Coppel	
West Germany	Andy Kapp	Florian Zörgiebel	Cristopher Huber	Ulrich Schneider	
Italy	Sandro Fachin	Andrea Pappacena	Paolo Constantini	Oscar Colucci	
Norway	Bjørn Ulshagen	Bjarte Nilsen	Terje Strand	Thomas Ulsrud	
Scotland	Hammy McMillan	David Smith	Peter Smith	Peter Thomson	
Sweden	Dan-Ola Eriksson	Jonas Sjölander	Christer Nylund	Stig Pettersson	Härnösands CK
Switzerland	Christian Saager	Jens Piesbergen	Urs Spiegel	Jörg Piesbergen	
United States	Roger Schnee	Kelly Yalowicki	Shane Way	Mark Lundgren	

== Round robin ==
Place	Team	1	2	3	4	5	6	7	8	9	10	Wins	Losses
1	Canada	*	6:5	6:3	5:8	9:4	7:4	7:5	10:3	12:1	8:4	8	1
2	Scotland	5:6	*	7:3	11:5	11:7	8:5	8:2	12:2	10:2	10:3	8	1
3	Switzerland	3:6	3:7	*	4:1	7:3	8:7	7:6	11:0	12:2	10:9	7	2
4	Norway	8:5	5:11	1:4	*	7:5	3:5	8:3	7:3	8:6	7:8	5	4
5	Sweden	4:9	7:11	3:7	5:7	*	6:4	4:9	10:4	9:4	9:3	4	5
6	United States	4:7	5:8	7:8	5:3	4:6	*	7:5	9:6	10:4	4:5	4	5
7	Germany	5:7	2:8	6:7	3:8	9:4	5:7	*	8:5	3:5	10:5	3	6
8	France	3:10	2:12	0:11	3:7	4:10	6:9	5:8	*	6:5	9:7	2	7
9	Italy	1:12	2:10	2:12	6:8	4:9	4:10	5:3	5:6	*	10:6	2	7
10	Denmark	4:8	3:10	9:10	8:7	3:9	5:4	5:10	7:9	6:10	*	2	7

Teams to playoffs

== Playoffs ==
Semifinals
1	Canada	11
4	Norway	2
2	Scotland	3
3	Switzerland	7

Gold Medal Game
1	Canada	6
3	Switzerland	5
Bronze Medal Game
4	Norway	4
2	Scotland	5

== Final standings ==
Place	Team	Games played	Wins	Losses
1st place, gold medalist(s)	Canada	11	10	1
2nd place, silver medalist(s)	Switzerland	11	8	3
3rd place, bronze medalist(s)	Scotland	11	9	2
4	Norway	11	5	6
5	Sweden	9	4	5
6	United States	9	4	5
7	Germany	9	3	6
8	France	9	2	7
9	Italy	9	2	7
10	Denmark	9	2	7

== Awards ==
- WJCC Sportsmanship Award: (United States) Roger Schnee

All-Star Team:

- Skip: (Canada) Bob Ursel
- Third: (Canada) Brent Mendella
- Second: (Scotland) Peter Smith
- Lead: (Scotland) Peter Thomson
