= Per Axelsson =

Swedish male curler

- Curler ♂
- Born: 4 November 1966 (age 60)

Team
- Curling club: Karlstads CK, Karlstad

Curling career
- Member Association: Sweden
- World Championship: 1 (1988)
Medal record
Curling

Per Olof Axelsson (born 4 November 1966) is a Swedish curler.

He is a participant of the 1988 World men's championship and a 1986 Swedisn mixed champion.

== Teams ==
=== Men's ===
Season	Skip	Third	Second	Lead	Events
1987–88	Sören Grahn	Henrik Holmberg	Per Axelsson	Håkan Funk	WCC 1988 (5th)

=== Mixed ===
Season	Skip	Third	Second	Lead	Events
1986	Per Axelsson	Anna Klange	Henrik Holmberg	Helena Klange	SMxCC 1986 (gold)
