= Marcia Tillisch =

American curler (1963–2014)

- Curler
- Other names: Marcia Pekar
- Born: October 8, 1963; Joliet, Illinois
- Died: November 20, 2014 (aged 51)

Team
- Curling club: Wausau CC, Wausau, Wisconsin

Curling career
- World Championship: 1 (1995)
Medal record
Curling
United States National Championships
Gold medal – first place	1995 Appleton

Marcia A. Tillisch (October 8, 1963 – November 20, 2014) was an American curler. She was a three-time national champion, once in women's and twice in mixed, and represented the United States at the 1995 World Women's Curling Championship.

== Curling career ==
Tillisch played lead for Lisa Schoeneberg in 1995 when they won the gold medal at the US National Championships with an undefeated 9–0 record. As national champions, Tillisch, Schoeneberg, and their other teammates Amy Wright and Lori Mountford continued on to represent the United States at the 1995 World Championship in Brandon, Manitoba. There they missed the playoffs, finishing tied for fifth with a 4–5 record. Tillisch was the top-ranked team at the championship with a 85% shooting percentage.

== Personal life ==
Tillisch was introduced to curling by her husband, Cal Tillisch. They both were very active in their local curling club in Wausau, Wisconsin.

== Teams ==
=== Women's ===
Season	Skip	Third	Second	Lead	Alternate	Events
1993–94	Lisa Schoeneberg	Amy Wright	Lori Mountford	Marcia Tillisch		
1994–95	Lisa Schoeneberg	Erika Brown	Lori Mountford	Marcia Tillisch	Allison Darragh	1995 USWCC (gold); 1995 WWCC (6th)

=== Mixed ===
Season	Skip	Third	Second	Lead	Events
1990–91	Geoff Goodland	Kathy Baldwin	Cal Tillisch	Marcia Tillisch	1991 USMxCC (gold)
1992–93	Geoff Goodland	Lori Mountford	Cal Tillisch	Marcia Tillisch	1993 USMxCC (gold)
