= Steve Brown (curler) =

American male curler and coach (born 1946)

- Curler ♂
- Born: November 22, 1946 (age 79); Galesville, Wisconsin, U.S.

Team
- Curling club: Madison CC, Madison, Wisconsin

Curling career
- Member Association: United States
- World Championship: 4 (1982, 1986, 1991, 2000)
- Other appearances: World Senior Championships: 2 (2002, 2004)
Medal record
Curling
World Championships
Bronze medal – third place	1986 Toronto
Bronze medal – third place	1991 Winnipeg
United States Men's Championship
Gold medal – first place	1982 Brookline
Gold medal – first place	1986 Seattle
Gold medal – first place	1991 Utica
Silver medal – second place	1980 Bemidji
Silver medal – second place	1985 Mequon
Silver medal – second place	1987 Lake Placid
Silver medal – second place	1989 Detroit
Silver medal – second place	1992 Grafton
Silver medal – second place	1995 Appleton
Bronze medal – third place	1988 St. Paul
Bronze medal – third place	1990 Superior
Bronze medal – third place	1994 Duluth
Bronze medal – third place	1996 Bemidji
Bronze medal – third place	1997 Seattle
World Senior Championships
Gold medal – first place	2002 Bismarck
Silver medal – second place	2004 Gävle

Steve Brown (born November 22, 1946) is an American curler and curling coach.

He is a 1986 and 1991 World Men's bronze medallist and a three time United States men's curling champion (1982, 1986, 1991).

== Awards ==
- United States Curling Hall of Fame: 1998
- U.S. Olympic Committee Curling Coach of the Year: 1996
- USA Curling Coach of the Year: 2012, 1996

== Teams ==
=== Men's ===
Season	Skip	Third	Second	Lead	Alternate	Coach	Events
1979–80	Steve Brown	Ed Sheffield	George Godfrey	Vince Fitzgerald			
1981–82	Steve Brown	Ed Sheffield	Huns Gustrowsky	George Godfrey		Elgie Noble	USMCC 1982 (gold); WCC 1982 (9th)
1984–85	Steve Brown	Geoff Goodland	George Godfrey	Huns Gustrowsky			
1985–86	Steve Brown	Wally Henry	George Godfrey	Richard Maskel	Huns Gustrowsky		USMCC 1986 (gold); WCC 1986 (bronze)
1986–87	Steve Brown	Wally Henry	George Godfrey	Richard Maskel			
1987–88	Steve Brown	Wally Henry	George Godfrey	Richard Maskel			
1988–89	Steve Brown	Wally Henry	George Godfrey	Richard Maskel			
1990–91	Steve Brown	Paul Pustovar	George Godfrey	Wally Henry	Mike Fraboni		USMCC 1991 (gold); WCC 1991 (bronze)
1991–92	Steve Brown	Paul Pustovar	George Godfrey	Richard Maskel	Mike Fraboni		
1993–94	Paul Pustovar (fourth)	Steve Brown (skip)	George Godfrey	Richard Maskel			
1994–95	Paul Pustovar (fourth)	Dave Violette	Richard Maskel	Steve Brown (skip)			
1995–96	Paul Pustovar (fourth)	Dave Violette	Richard Maskel	Steve Brown (skip)			
1996–97	Steve Brown	Dave Violette	Richard Maskel	Paul Pustovar			
1998–99	Craig Brown	Matt Stevens	Jon Brunt	Steve Brown			
1999–00	Craig Brown	Ryan Quinn	Jon Brunt	John Dunlop	Steve Brown	Diane Brown	WCC 2000 (4th)
2001–02	Larry Johnson	Stan Vinge	George Godfrey	Bill Kind	Steve Brown		USSCC 2002 (gold); WSCC 2002 (gold)
2003–04	Bill Kind	George Godfrey	Walter Erbach	Larry Sharp	Steve Brown		USSCC 2004 (gold); WSCC 2004 (silver)

=== Mixed ===
Season	Skip	Third	Second	Lead	Events
1984	Steve Brown	Diane Brown	Vince Fitzgerald	Georgia Fitzgerald	USMxCC 1984 (gold)
1988	Steve Brown	Lisa Schoeneberg	Paul Schaefer	Bonnie Mansfield	USMxCC 1988 (gold)

== Record as a coach of national teams ==
Year	Tournament, event	National team	Place
1998	1998 Winter Olympics	United States (women)	5
1999	1999 World Women's Curling Championship	United States (women)	2nd place, silver medalist(s)
2004	2004 World Women's Curling Championship	United States (women)	4
2008	2008 World Wheelchair Curling Championship	United States (wheelchair)	3rd place, bronze medalist(s)
2008	2008 World Men's Curling Championship	United States (men)	7
2009	2009 World Wheelchair Curling Championship	United States (wheelchair)	4
2010	2010 Winter Paralympics	United States (wheelchair)	4
2011	2011 World Wheelchair Curling Championship	United States (wheelchair)	7
2012	2012 World Wheelchair Curling Championship	United States (wheelchair)	5
2013	2013 World Wheelchair Curling Championship	United States (wheelchair)	4
2014	2014 Winter Paralympics	United States (wheelchair)	5
2015	2015 World Wheelchair Curling Championship	United States (wheelchair)	5
2016	2016 World Wheelchair Curling Championship	United States (wheelchair)	6
2017	2017 World Wheelchair Curling Championship	United States (wheelchair)	7

== Personal life ==
Steve Brown started curling in 1960, when he was 14 years old.

His children, son Craig Brown and daughter Erika Brown, are well-known American curlers too, US champions and World medallists. Steve's wife Diane Brown is also a curler, and Steve and Diane together won the US Mixed championship in 1984.

He is founder and owner of Steve's Curling Supplies, a curling equipment company.
