= Mikael Norberg =

Swedish curler

Medal record

Curling

European Championships
Silver medal – second place	1992	A Group
Bronze medal – third place	2006	A Group

Mikael Norberg (born 20 October 1966 in Sundsvall) is a Swedish curler.

Norberg started playing curling in 1978. He plays in third position as a vice skip and is right-handed.

In 2003 he was inducted into the Swedish Curling Hall of Fame.
