= Per Carlsén =

Swedish curler

Medal record

Curling

European Championships
Silver medal – second place	1992 Perth	
Bronze medal – third place	2006 Basel	

Per Carlsén (born 24 June 1960, in Sundsvall) is a Swedish curler. He is a two-time European Curling Championship medallist, and has represented Sweden in four World Curling Championships and two World Senior Curling Championships. In 2023, he coached Sweden to a gold medal at the World Mixed Curling Championship.

Carlsén started playing curling in 1975. He plays in fourth position as a skip and is right-handed.

In 2001 he was inducted into the Swedish Curling Hall of Fame.
