= Madison Curling Club =

Wisconsin USA Curling Club

Coordinates: 43°01′49.3″N 89°17′11.7″W

- Location: 4802 Marsh Road; McFarland, WI 53558

Information
- Established: 1921
- Club type: Dedicated Ice
- USCA region: Wisconsin
- Sheets of ice: Six
- Rock colors: Red and Yellow
- Website: http://madisoncurlingclub.com/

The Madison Curling Club (MCC) is a curling club located in McFarland, Wisconsin, United States. MCC was the third-largest curling club in the United States with 570 members as of February 2014. The club had 590 members for the 2019-2020 season.

== History ==
Planning for the club started in 1919 and then the Madison Curling Club was formally established in 1921. For the club's first eight years games were played under the bleachers at Camp Randall Stadium. In 1930 the club moved to Burr Jones Field in Madison. In 1997 the club moved into their current facility in William McFarland Park in McFarland. The MCC has had at least one member curl for Team USA in every Winter Olympics since curling was instated as a full Olympic sport in 1998.

== Leagues ==
Through the curling season Madison Curling Club members participate in leagues including men's, women's, open (any combination of gender), doubles, and instructional. MCC members are assigned a 1- to 20-point value based on their experience and skill. Many leagues have a point cap not to be exceeded by each team.

== National and International Championships ==
Teams organized out of the Madison Curling Club have won 6 United States Men's Curling Championships and 15 United States Women's Curling Championships.

The Madison Curling Club has hosted the following championship events

- 1968 US Curling Championship
- 2001 US Curling Championship
- 2005 US Curling Championship (served as US Olympic Trials in 2005).
- 1975 US Junior Championship
- 1987 US Women's Junior Championship
- 1994 US Junior Championship
- 2012 US Junior Championship

== Bonspiels ==
The Madison Curling Club hosts many bonspiels throughout the season as fundraisers or tour sanctioned events:

- Halloween Spiel
- Curl vs Cancer Bonspiel
- Schmecken Spiel!
- Madison Cash Spiel
- Mixed Doubles Bonspiel
- Madison Men's Bonspiel
- Madison Mixed Bonspiel
- Madison Junior Bonspiel

== Affiliations ==
- Wisconsin State Curling Association
- United States Curling Association

== Notable Members ==
- Craig Brown
  - 4× U.S. National Runner-up: 2001, 2005, 2014, 2015
  - 2× U.S. National Champion: 2000, 2008
  - U.S. Curling Association Male Athlete of the Year: 2000
  - Olympian: 2014
- Erika Brown
  - 8× U.S. National Champion: 1995, 1996, 1999, 2002, 2004, 2010, 2013, 2015
  - 2× World Championships Runner-up: 1996, 1999
  - 3× Olympian: 1988, 1998, 2014
- Steve Brown
  - Senior World Championships Runner-up: 2004
  - Senior World Champion: 2002
  - Coach of U.S. Men's National Champion: 2000
  - 4× Coach of U.S. Women's National Championships Runner-up: 1991, 1994, 2000, 2003
  - 5× Coach of U.S. Women's National Champion: 1992, 1995, 1996, 1999, 2004
  - U.S. Olympic Committee Curling Coach of the Year: 1996
  - 2× USA Curling Coach of the Year: 1996, 2012;
  - USA Curling Hall of Fame Member: 1998
- Mike Fraboni
  - 2× U.S. National Champion: 1991, 2002
- George Godfrey
  - 5× U.S. National Runner-up: 1980, 1985, 1987, 1989, 1992
  - 3× U.S. National Champion: 1982, 1986, 1991
  - Senior World Championships Runner-up: 2004
  - Senior World Champion: 2002
- Becca Hamilton
  - Women's Team Olympian: 2018
  - Mixed Doubles Olympian: 2018
  - U.S. Curling Association Female Athlete of the Year: 2017
  - U.S. National Champion: 2014
  - 2× U.S. Junior Champion: 2008, 2011

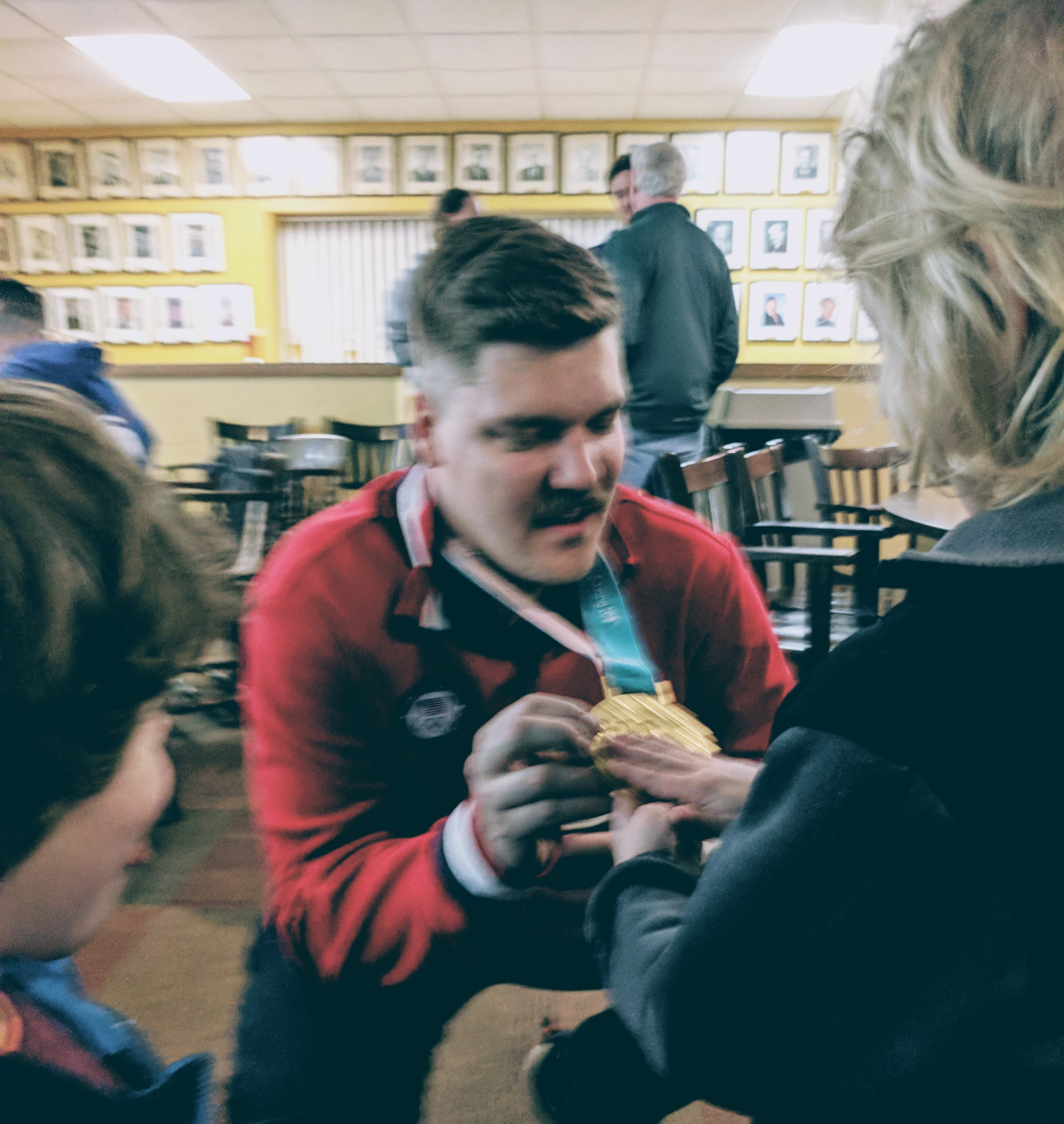
Matt Hamilton with Olympic Gold Medal at Madison Curling Club

- Matt Hamilton
  - Men's Team Olympic Gold Medalist: 2018
  - Mixed Doubles Olympian: 2018
  - U.S. Curling Association Male Athlete of the Year: 2017
  - World Men's Championship Bronze Medalist: 2016
  - U.S. National Champion: 2015
  - U.S. National Runner-up: 2014
  - 2× U.S. Junior Champion: 2008, 2009
  - World Junior Champion: 2008
- Nicole Joraanstad
  - 2× U.S. Junior Champion: 2000, 2001
  - 2× U.S. Junior Championships Runner-up: 1997, 1999
  - 6× U.S. National Champion: 2002, 2004, 2006, 2007, 2008, 2009
  - World Championships Runner-up: 2006
  - Olympian: 2010
- Richard Maskel
  - 5× U.S. National Runner-up: 1987, 1990, 1992, 1995, 1997
  - 3× U.S. National Champion: 1986, 2002, 2003
- Debbie McCormick
  - 4× U.S. Junior Champion: 1991, 1992, 1993, 1994
  - 2× World Junior Runner-up: 1992, 1994
  - 6× U.S. National Champion: 1996, 2001, 2003, 2006, 2007, 2008
  - 3× U.S. National Runner-up: 2002, 2004, 2005
  - World Champion: 2003
  - 2× World Championships Runner-up: 1996, 2006
  - 4× Olympian: 1998, 2002, 2010, 2014
- Nina (Spatola) Roth
  - Olympian: 2018
  - 2× U.S. National Champion: 2010, 2014
- Lori Mountford
  - 2× Olympian: 1988, 1998
  - 2× World Championships Runner-up: 1992, 1996
  - 3× U.S. National Champion: 1992, 1995, 1996
