= Roy Vinthers =

Canadian curler

Medal record

Men's Curling

Representing British Columbia

Macdonald Brier
Silver medal – second place	1977 Montreal	

LeRoy (Roy) Vinthers (born c. 1931–1997) was a Canadian curler from Vancouver, British Columbia. He is a former British Columbia provincial champion skip, and was the runner-up at the 1977 Macdonald Brier, Canada's national men's curling championship. Vinthers grew up in Inglis, Manitoba.

== Playing career ==
Vinthers played third for the Harry McConachie rink at the 1954 provincial championship. The team finished third.

Vinthers began skipping in 1959. He and teammates Leo Hebert, Howie Christopherson and George Ingram won the $9,000 Totem Bonspiel in 1959. The team played in the 1960 BC Championships, where they were eliminated in the first round of the "B event".

In 1961, Christopherson took over as skip with Vinthers at third with front end George Ingram and Charlie Gardner. The team won the Pacific Coast playdowns putting them into the BC final. The provincial championship was a best of three series between the Pacific Coast champion Christopherson rink and Interior champion Reg Stone. Team Christopherson won the first match 11-4, but lost the next two, 12-6 and 10-9. In 1964, with Vinthers skipping, his rink lost in the Pacific Coast final to Lyall Dagg, who went on to win the World Curling Championships that year. In 1965, Vinthers took over as skip of the Dagg rink, with Dagg unable to curl due to "pressure of business". However, Vinthers was unable to lead the rink out of the 1965 Pacific playdowns, losing to Jack Arnet in the Pacific Coast finals. In 1966, Vinthers began curling out of Kamloops, where he lived for five years, then lived one year in Edmonton and three in Winnipeg. He moved back to the Vancouver area in 1973.

In 1976, Vinthers teamed up with former teammates Leo Hebert and Barry Naimark who had played for Lyall Dagg as well as second Greg Pruden. Naimark joined the team for playdowns after the team's regular lead, Al Richards couldn't compete due to getting a new job. The team won the 1977 BC Men's championships defeating the Al LaChance rink of Kamloops 5-3 and 6-4 in the best of three final. LaChance had been Vinthers' barber while living in Kamloops. This qualified the rink to represent British Columbia at the 1977 Macdonald Brier in Montreal. The team had a great start at the event, winning their first eight games, but lost their remaining three games, including a match against Quebec's Jim Ursel rink. That game proved to be pivotal as Quebec ended up winning the Brier with a 9-2 record, one more than B.C. who finished tied in second place.

The next season, Vinthers won the $18,500 1977 Labatt's Bonspiel. While Vinthers faltered in zone play that year, he did see action at the 1978 Macdonald Brier in Vancouver, as a spare for Northern Ontario, replacing John Ballantyne who couldn't play one day due to muscle spasms.

Vinther's last major spiel win was in 1980 when he won the $29,000 Peace Country Curling Classic.

== Personal life ==
At the time of the 1977 Brier, Vinthers was employed as a terminal manager for Canadian Auto Carriers.
