= 1990 Canadian Senior Curling Championships =

The 1990 Canadian Senior Curling Championships, Canada's national championship for curlers over 50, were held March 10 to 17, 1990 at the Mount McIntyre Recreation Centre in Whitehorse, Yukon.

In the men's final, 1977 Brier champion Jim Ursel, representing Manitoba, defeated British Columbia's Jerry Martin 5–4. Ursel credited the win to a hit and roll made on his first in the sixth end, which was followed up by Martin rubbing off a guard on his last. With hammer, Ursel drew for two, instead of having to face four BC stones. This game Manitoba a 2–1 lead. BC took the lead in the seventh, but Manitoba took control with a three-ender in the eighth. In that end, Martin made a near perfect freeze on his last, but Ursel was able to pick it out to score three. This gave Manitoba a 5–3 lead, in which they never looked back.

In the women's final, Ontario's Jill Greenwood beat Amy Nakamura of Alberta, 9–4, despite the team struggling early on in the game which resulted in the team throwing wrong rocks on occasion, and didn't get a feel of the ice. It was the third national title for teams from Ontario that season, with Ed Werenich winning the 1990 Brier and Alison Goring winning the 1990 Tournament of Hearts.

== Men's ==
=== Teams ===
The men's teams were as follows:

Province / Territory	Skip	Third	Second	Lead	Club
Saskatchewan	Ken May	Earnie Harder	Frank Rissling	John Brunner	Burstall Curling Club, Burstall
Newfoundland	Damien Ryan	Fred Wright	Ross Snelgrove	Joe Burden	St. John's Curling Club, St. John's
Alberta	Wilbur Hosker	Sten Aalhus	Gwen Pomeroy	George Ouellette	Fort St. John Curling Club, Fort St. John, British Columbia
Northern Ontario	Tom Melnyk	Bob Dufort	Don Harris	Fred Russell	Canadian Forces Curling Club, Hornell Heights, North Bay
Nova Scotia	Barry Shearer	John Etter	Colin Macleod	James Gavin	Halifax Curling Club, Halifax
British Columbia	Jerry Martin	Leo Hebert	William Lohner	Ted Moir	Vancouver Curling Club, Vancouver
Manitoba	Jim Ursel	Norm Houck	Henry Kroeger	Stan Lamont	Elmwood Curling Club, Winnipeg
Yukon/Northwest Territories	Ed Derbowka	Gerry Miller	Allan Gee	Gordon Gee	Whitehorse Curling Club, Whitehorse
Quebec	Gerald Tomalty	Willard Orr	Tom Jamison	Calvin McAndrew	Brownsburg Curling Club, Brownsburg
New Brunswick	Glen Mawhinney	Michael Blanchard	James Shephard	Lloyd McKinley	Thistle St. Andrew Curling Club, Saint John
Prince Edward Island	Boyde White	Allison (Joe) Saunders	Jerry Muzika	Don Rogers	Charlottetown Curling Club, Charlottetown
Ontario	William Dickie	John Sigmar	Keith MacGregor	Gerry Walsh	Cornwall Curling Club, Cornwall

=== Standings ===
Final round-robin standings.

Key
Teams to playoff

Locale	Skip	W	L
British Columbia	Jerry Martin	9	2
Yukon/Northwest Territories	Ed Derbowka	8	3
Manitoba	Jim Ursel	8	3
Saskatchewan	Ken May	7	4
Alberta	Wilbur Hosker	6	5
Newfoundland	Damien Ryan	6	5
Ontario	William Dickie	5	6
Northern Ontario	Tom Melnyk	5	6
Prince Edward Island	Boyde White	4	7
Nova Scotia	Barry Shearer	3	8
Quebec	Gerald Tomalty	3	8
New Brunswick	Glen Mawhinney	2	9

=== Playoffs ===
Semifinal		Final
Yukon/Northwest Territories	3
Manitoba	6	Manitoba	5
		British Columbia	4

==== Semifinal ====
March 16

Team	1	2	3	4	5	6	7	8	9	10	Final
Manitoba (Ursel)	0	0	0	3	0	1	0	2	0	0	6
Yukon/Northwest Territories (Derbowka)	0	0	2	0	1	0	1	0	1	0	3

==== Final ====
Team	1	2	3	4	5	6	7	8	9	10	Final
British Columbia (Martin)	0	0	0	1	0	0	2	0	1	0	4
Manitoba (Ursel)	0	0	0	0	0	2	0	3	0	0	5

== Women's ==
=== Teams ===
The women's teams were as follows:

Province / Territory	Skip	Third	Second	Lead	Club
British Columbia	Evelyn Hosker	Rose Holland	Ruth Smith	Stella Kientz	Fort St. John Curling Club, Fort St. John
Yukon/Northwest Territories	Madeline Boyd	Arla Repka	Gwen Byram	Elizabeth Friesen	Whitehorse Curling Club, Whitehorse
Quebec	Dorothy Crowe	Lois Hills	Cosette Richard	Barbara Maguire	St. Lambert Curling Club, Saint-Lambert
Ontario	Jill Greenwood	Yvonne Smith	Maymar Gemmell	Victoria Lauder	Humber Highland Curling Club, Toronto
Manitoba	Joan Ingram	Dorothy Rose	Elaine James	Diane Hungerford	Thistle Curling Club, Winnipeg
Prince Edward Island	Gen Enman	Marie Gaudet	Wanda MacLean	Mary Campbell	Silver Fox Curling and Yacht Club, Summerside
Newfoundland	Lillian Howse	Elizabeth James	Elizabeth Baird-Cross	Barbara Dawe	Grand Falls Curling Club, Grand Falls
Nova Scotia	Jean Skinner	Adine Boutilier	Shirley Pace	Barbara MacLeod	Sydney Curling Club, Sydney
Saskatchewan	Kay Shaner	Joyce Schroik	Donna Wilhelm	Ruth Shea	Swift Current Curling Club, Swift Current
Alberta	Amy Nakamura	Nancy Setoguchi	June Kanomata	Mae Sasaki	Taber Golf and Curling Club, Taber
New Brunswick	Eleanor Stewart	Donna McConkey	Dawn Kean	Shirley Fifield	Thistle St. Andrew Curling Club, Saint John

=== Standings ===
Final round-robin standings.

Key
Teams to playoff

Locale	Skip	W	L
Ontario	Jill Greenwood	8	2
Alberta	Amy Nakamura	7	3
Manitoba	Joan Ingram	7	3
British Columbia	Evelyn Hosker	6	4
New Brunswick	Eleanor Stewart	6	4
Quebec	Dorothy Crowe	6	4
Saskatchewan	Kay Shaner	4	6
Newfoundland	Lillian Howse	4	6
Yukon/Northwest Territories	Madeline Boyd	4	6
Nova Scotia	Jean Skinner	2	8
Prince Edward Island	Gen Enman	1	9

=== Playoffs ===
Semifinal		Final
Alberta	8
Manitoba	4	Alberta	4
		Ontario	9

==== Semifinal ====
Team	1	2	3	4	5	6	7	8	9	10	Final
Alberta (Nakamura)	1	1	0	1	1	1	0	3	0	X	8
Manitoba (Ingram)	0	0	1	0	0	0	2	0	1	X	4

==== Final ====
Team	1	2	3	4	5	6	7	8	9	10	Final
Ontario (Greenwood)	1	0	2	0	1	0	2	2	1	X	9
Alberta (Nakamura)	0	2	0	0	0	2	0	0	0	X	4
