= Brian Ross (curler) =

Canadian male curler

- Curler ♂
- Born: Arvida, Quebec

Team
- Curling club: St. Laurent CC, Mount Royal, QC, Pointe-Claire CC, Pointe-Claire, QC

Curling career
- Member Association: Quebec
- Brier: 1: (1977)
- World Championship: 1 (1977)
Medal record
Curling
Representing Canada
World Championships
Silver medal – second place	1977 Karlstad
Representing Quebec
Macdonald Brier
Gold medal – first place	1977 Montreal
Bronze medal – third place	1976 Regina

Brian G. Ross (born c. 1946) is a Canadian curler.

He is a 1977 World Men's silver medallist and a 1977 Brier champion.

Ross is originally from Arvida, Quebec. At the time of the 1977 Brier, he was working for Air Canada as a passenger agent.

== Teams ==
Season	Skip	Third	Second	Lead	Events
1975–76	Jim Ursel	Art Lobel	Don Aitken	Brian Ross	Brier 1976 (bronze)
1976–77	Jim Ursel	Art Lobel	Don Aitken	Brian Ross	Brier 1977 (gold); WCC 1977 (silver)
1999–00	Don Aitken	Doug Hanson	Brian Ross	Bob Suderman	CSCC 2000 (10th)
