= Jim Ursel =

Canadian curler (1937–2021)

- Curler
- Born: January 22, 1937; Winnipeg, Manitoba
- Died: September 29, 2021 (aged 84)

Team
- Curling club: Strathcona Curling Club (Winnipeg); St. Laurent Curling Club (Mount Royal); Elmwood Curling Club (Winnipeg); Charleswood Curling Club (Winnipeg); Kelowna Curling Club (Kelowna)

Curling career
- Brier: 7 (1962, 1974, 1975, 1976, 1977, 1979, 1980)
- World Championship: 1 (1977)
Medal record
Representing Canada
World Curling Championship
Silver medal – second place	1977 Karlstad
Macdonald Brier
Representing Quebec
Gold medal – first place	1977 Montreal
Bronze medal – third place	1976 Regina
Bronze medal – third place	1974 London
Representing Manitoba
Bronze medal – third place	1962 Kitchener

James William Ursel (January 22, 1937 – September 29, 2021), also known as Jimmy Ursel, was a Canadian curler. He was the skip of the 1977 Brier Champion team, representing Quebec.

== Biography ==
Ursel was born in Winnipeg to Pauline and Rudy Ursel. He grew up in Glenella, Manitoba, and moved to back to Winnipeg at age 15. While attending Gordon Bell High School, he won a provincial school boy championship in 1954, playing lead for a team skipped by Gene Walker. The team represented Manitoba at the 1954 National Schoolboy Championship, today known as the Canadian Junior Curling Championships. There, the team finished the round robin with an 8–1 record, tied with Saskatchewan's Bayne Secord rink. The two teams then faced off for the championship, in which Saskatchewan prevailed.

He won his lone Manitoba provincial men's championship in 1962, playing third for Norm Houck. At the 1962 Macdonald Brier, the team finished in a three-way tie for third place with an 8–2 record following the round robin. The team then played Alberta's Hec Gervais rink in a tie-break, which they lost. Ursel was named as the All-Star third by the press.

Ursel's job as an Air Canada administrative assistant in the finance department transferred him to the company's head office in Montreal, where he lived from 1974 to 1980. While living in Quebec, he won the Quebec Men's Curling Championship six times. His first Quebec title came in 1974, when his St. Laurent Curling Club (playing out of Mount Royal) team of Bill Ross, Alf Berting and Freddie Topp defeated the Bill Tracy rink from Arvida in the final. At the 1974 Macdonald Brier, Ursel led his Quebec team to a 6–4 record, in a four-way tie for third place. Ursel formed a new team for the 1975 season, with Art Lobel, Don Aitken and Howie Atkinson. He won his second straight Quebec title that year, defeating former teammate Bill Ross in the final. At the 1975 Macdonald Brier, the team finished with a 6–5 record, in a four-way tie for fifth. Ursel won a third straight Quebec title in 1976 with new lead Brian Ross replacing Atkinson. The team beat Ted Girouard from the Sigma Curling Club in Val-d'Or to win the title. At the 1976 Macdonald Brier, Ursel led the team to a 7–4 record, in a three-way tie for third place.

Ursel, Lobel, Aitken and Ross defended their Quebec title in 1977, defeating Gerry Tremblay from Arvida in the provincial final. The team then went on to win the 1977 Macdonald Brier, the first Brier win for Quebec, and on home ice at the Montreal Velodrome. At the Brier, he was named as the All-star skip of the tournament. The team represented Canada at the 1977 Air Canada Silver Broom World Championship, where they won the silver medal, losing to Sweden's Ragnar Kamp in the final.

Ursel missed the playoffs at the 1978 provincials, but won a fifth Quebec title in 1979 with Aitken and a new front end of Warren Wallace and Malcolm Turner. The team defeated the Andre Desjardins rink from Kénogami in the Quebec final. At the 1979 Macdonald Brier, Ursel led the team to a 5–6, tied for 7th place. Ursel won his final Quebec championship in 1980 with Aitken, Lorne Steventon and Tuner. The team defeated Dave Moon from Montreal's Caledonia Club in the final. At the 1980 Brier, now sponsored by Labatt's, Ursel led his rink to a 7–4 round robin record, finishing in fourth. They just missed the newly introduced playoffs.

Ursel was transferred back Winnipeg in 1980. While in Manitoba, he won two Canadian Senior Curling Championships in 1990 and 1991. Ursel retired to Kelowna, British Columbia in 1997, and won a provincial Masters championship in 1998. He died on September 29, 2021, from cancer, at the age of 84.

In 1985, Ursel coached his sons Bob and Mike to a gold medal at the 1985 World Junior Curling Championships. He also coached his daughter Jill at two Canadian Junior Championships.

He was married to Carol, and had three children (Bob, Mike and Jill). He is a member of the Manitoba Curling Hall of Fame, the Quebec Curling Hall of Fame, the Manitoba Sports Hall of Fame and the Canadian Curling Hall of Fame. Ursel worked for Air Canada from the age of 18 until retiring at age 52. In retirement, he also skied, golfed and played pickleball.
