= Barry Naimark =

Canadian curler

- Curler
- Born: July 1, 1932; Regina, Saskatchewan
- Died: December 3, 2004 (aged 72); Halfmoon Bay, British Columbia

Curling career
- Brier: 4 (1959, 1964, 1970, 1977)
Medal record
Representing Canada
Men's Curling
World championships
Gold medal – first place	1964 Calgary	Team
Macdonald Brier
Representing British Columbia
Gold medal – first place	1964 Charlottetown
Silver medal – second place	1977 Montreal
Bronze medal – third place	1970 Winnipeg

R. B. (Barry) Naimark (July 1, 1932 – December 3, 2004) was a Canadian curler. He played as lead on the Lyall Dagg rink that won the 1964 Brier and World Championship. He also played in the 1959 Macdonald Brier as the skip of the British Columbia team (which included newspaper columnist Dick Beddoes at lead), finishing fourth. He died of cancer in 2004.

== Personal life ==
In addition to curling, Naimark was also a race horse owner. Naimark learned to curl in Leader, Saskatchewan. He lived in Calgary before moving to Vancouver. He also played ice hockey, baseball, trapshooting, and table tennis.
