= Dick Beddoes =

Canadian sports journalist

- Born: Richard Herbert Beddoes c. 1926; Daysland, Alberta
- Died: 24 August 1991 (aged 64–65); Toronto, Ontario
- Occupation: sports journalist

Richard Herbert Beddoes (c. 1926 – 24 August 1991) was a Canadian sports journalist. He was a columnist for The Vancouver Sun and The Globe and Mail and later appeared on television and radio.

== Early life ==
Beddoes was born in Daysland, Alberta at his family's farm residence. He referred to his home town as "Sheep Tracks, Alberta". He attended the University of Alberta, first in the agriculture program, then transferring to its education faculty.

== Career ==
In 1951, Beddoes joined the Edmonton Bulletin, just before that historic newspaper folded. Later that year, he joined the Vancouver Sun as a police reporter, writing his first sports columns by late 1951. In 1959, Beddoes won the British Columbia men's curling championship playing lead for the Barry Naimark rink. They represented the province at the 1959 Macdonald Brier.

He moved to Toronto to work for The Globe and Mail in 1964. As the paper's senior sports columnist, he wrote a column which predicted that the Canadian team would win every game of the 1972 Summit Series against the Soviet Union. After the Soviet team won the first game of that series, Beddoes ate a printed copy of that column after covering it with borscht.

He remained on staff with the Globe and Mail until his column on 3 September 1980 was revealed to have contained substantial, unattributed material from the New York Times. After publishing an apology, Beddoes left print media and was subsequently appointed sports director at CHCH-TV in Hamilton where he remained until his dismissal in 1988. In January 1990, he joined CFRB radio in Toronto as host of The Sports Connection talk show.

Beddoes also ghost-wrote a syndicated column on behalf of hockey player Bobby Orr in the late 1960s.

Beddoes was known for his variety of clothing colours and his numerous hats, He directly influenced Don Cherry's broadcasting career and clothing choices.

=== Politics ===
Beddoes was a resident of Etobicoke and served a term on the Etobicoke borough council as alderman for Ward 2 after winning a seat in the 1969 municipal election.

== Death ==
Beddoes died of liver cancer in August 1991 at a Toronto hospital.

== Books ==
- Beddoes, Richard; Fischler, Stan; Gitler, Ira (1969). Hockey! The story of the world's fastest sport. Macmillan. OCLC 33429.
- Beddoes, Dick; Roberts, John (1974). Summit 74: The Canada/Russia Hockey Series. Methuen. ISBN 978-0458911707.
- Beddoes, Dick (1989). Pal Hal. Macmillan. ISBN 978-0771594625.
- Beddoes, Dick (1990). Dick Beddoes' greatest hockey stories. Macmillan. ISBN 978-0771591068.
