= Kenneth R. MacDonald =

Canadian judge (1935–2022)

Supreme Court of Prince Edward Island

Personal details
- Born: June 29, 1935 Kilmuir, Prince Edward Island
- Died: August 22, 2022 (aged 87) Edinburgh, Scotland
- Education: Bachelor of Commerce (1957); Bachelor of Laws (1960)
- Alma mater: Dalhousie University

Kenneth Ross MacDonald (June 29, 1935 – August 22, 2022) was a judge in the Supreme Court of Prince Edward Island. He was also one of the top curlers in the province, representing Prince Edward Island at the 1967, 1976, 1977, 1979 and 1984 Briers.

MacDonald died after a brief illness, on August 22, 2022, in the Royal Infirmary of Edinburgh, Scotland.

== History ==
MacDonald was admitted to the Bar of Prince Edward Island in 1962. In the 1970s, MacDonald worked for a firm named Foster, MacDonald & Carruthers. At this time MacDonald also served as Secretary-Treasurer for the Law Society of Prince Edward Island.

MacDonald retired in August 2001. Kenneth R. MacDonald continued to do interviews and discuss legal issues in the media following his retirement.

== Notable trials ==
In 1980, Kenneth R. MacDonald judged MacKinnon v Hashie which has been cited in numerous subsequent cases.

In 1992, MacDonald judged Kane v Canadian Ladies Golf Association, in which Canadian professional golfer Lorrie Kane was permitted to participate in a tournament despite the golf association's former decision that Kane could not participate.

In 2000, MacDonald judged R v MacAulay, a landmark case in Canadian impaired driving law.
