= Les Rogers (curler) =

Canadian curler

- Curler

Team
- Curling club: Thistle CC, Edmonton, AB
- Skip: Les Rogers
- Fourth: Aaron Bartling
- Second: Jason Hardy
- Lead: Jason McPhee

Curling career
- Brier: 1 (1977)
Medal record
Men's curling
Representing Canada
World Senior Curling Championships
Gold medal – first place	2006 Copenhagen

Les Rogers is a Canadian curler from Edmonton, Alberta. He is a former Canadian and World Senior champion.

== Career ==
Rogers began his curling career in Saskatchewan. He won the provincial championship in that province in 1977 with teammates Greg Manwaring, Moe Tait and Vic Rogers. The team represented Saskatchewan at the 1977 Macdonald Brier where they finished 5–6.

Rogers would find more success as a Seniors curler. He is a two-time provincial senior champion. His team of Marv Wirth, Ken McLean and Millard Evans won both the 2005 and 2006 provincial seniors titles. In 2005, they won the Canadian Senior Curling Championships. They had gone 9-2 after the round robin, in a three-way tie for first. However they went on to win the semi-final against Northern Ontario's Al Harnden and the final against Saskatchewan's Eugene Hritzuk. At the 2006 Canadian Senior Curling Championships, Rogers would again represent Alberta, and finished the round robin with an 8–3 record, in a four-way tie for first place. They would play in the final of the event against Northern Ontario's Al Hackner whom they lost to. By virtue of winning the 2005 Canadian Seniors, Rogers and his rink got to represent Canada at the 2006 World Senior Curling Championships. At the World Seniors, Rogers led Canada to a 7–0 record, for first place in their pool. They then beat Denmark's Johannes Jensen in the semi-final and the United States' Brian Simonson in the final.
