= 1977 Macdonald Brier =

- Host city: Montreal, Quebec
- Arena: Olympic Velodrome
- Dates: March 6-12
- Attendance: 50,001
- Winner: Quebec
- Curling club: St. Laurent CC, Mount Royal
- Skip: Jim Ursel
- Third: Art Lobel
- Second: Don Aitken
- Lead: Brian Ross

The 1977 Macdonald Brier, the Canadian men's national curling championship was held from March 6 to 12, 1977 at the Olympic Velodrome in Montreal, Quebec. Total attendance for the week was 50,001. This was the first time since 1928 in which the number of ends for a regulation game was changed as games were shortened from 12 to 10 ends.

Team Quebec, who was skipped by Jim Ursel captured the Brier tankard on home soil as they finished round robin with a 9–2 record. This was Quebec's first Brier title. With Newfoundland winning their first Brier the previous year, this was the second and most recent time in which consecutive Briers were won by a province who had previously won a Brier. The other time was the first two editions in 1927 and 1928.

The Ursel rink would go onto represent Canada in the 1977 Air Canada Silver Broom, the men's world curling championship in Karlstad, Sweden where they would finish runner-up, losing in the final to host Sweden.

Newfoundland's 11–0 victory over Prince Edward Island in Draw 11 was only the second time in which a shutout was recorded in the Brier with the previous occurrence being in 1951. Nova Scotia's 4–2 victory over Northern Ontario in Draw 13 tied a Brier record for fewest combined points in one game by both teams with six, which also happened in 1974.

== Teams ==
The teams were as follows:

Alberta	British Columbia	Manitoba
Crestwood CC, Edmonton Skip: Tom Reed; Third: Kevin Byrne; Second: Tony Rankel; Lead: Lorne Reed	Vancouver CC, Vancouver Skip: Roy Vinthers; Third: Leo Hebert; Second: Greg Pruden; Lead: Barry Naimark	Lac du Bonnet CC, Lac du Bonnet Skip: John Usackis; Third: Dave Romano; Second: Ed Thomson; Lead: Bob Collez
New Brunswick	Newfoundland	Northern Ontario
Fredericton CC, Fredericton Skip: Roly Mockler; Third: Phil LePage; Second: Jeff Mockler; Lead: Marty Mockler	St. John's CC, St. John's Skip: L. Wayne Hamilton; Third: Joe Power Jr. Second: Ken Thomas; Lead: Paul Hamilton	Idylwylde G&CC, Sudbury Skip: John Tate; Third: Bob Miller; Second: Wayne Leavoy; Lead: George Medakovic
Nova Scotia	Ontario	Prince Edward Island
CFB Halifax CC, Halifax Skip: Bob Fitzner; Third: Bruce MacArthur; Second: John MacBain; Lead: Terry Aho	Avonlea CC, Don Mills Skip: Paul Savage; Third: Ed Werenich; Second: Ron Green; Lead: Reid Ferguson	Belvedere G&WC, Charlottetown Skip: Ken MacDonald; Third: George Dillon; Second: Al Ledgerwood; Lead: Keith MacEachern
Quebec	Saskatchewan	Yukon/Northwest Territories
St. Laurent CC, Mount Royal Skip: Jim Ursel; Third: Art Lobel; Second: Don Aitken; Lead: Brian Ross	Caledonia CC, Regina Skip: Les Rogers; Third: Greg Manwaring; Second: Moe Tait; Lead: Vic Rogers	Whitehorse CC, Whitehorse Skip: Don Twa; Third: Johnny Trout; Second: Lionel Stokes; Lead: Kip Boyd

== Map of teams ==
Provincial Winners

== Round Robin standings ==
Final Round Robin standings

Key
Brier champion

Province	Skip	W	L	PF	PA
Quebec	Jim Ursel	9	2	87	50
British Columbia	Roy Vinthers	8	3	84	63
Ontario	Paul Savage	8	3	73	48
Newfoundland	L. Wayne Hamilton	7	4	70	64
Manitoba	John Usackis	6	5	75	69
Alberta	Tom Reed	6	5	65	68
Yukon/Northwest Territories	Don Twa	5	6	62	68
Saskatchewan	Les Rogers	5	6	69	66
Northern Ontario	John Tate	4	7	66	67
Nova Scotia	Bob Fitzner	3	8	50	75
New Brunswick	Roly Mockler	3	8	59	90
Prince Edward Island	Ken MacDonald	2	9	47	79

== Round Robin results ==
All draw times are listed in Eastern Time Zone (UTC-05:00).

=== Draw 1 ===
Sunday, March 6, 2:00 pm

Team	1	2	3	4	5	6	7	8	9	10	Final
New Brunswick (Mockler)	0	2	0	0	1	0	1	0	0	X	4
Quebec (Ursel)	3	0	3	0	0	1	0	1	1	X	9

Team	1	2	3	4	5	6	7	8	9	10	Final
Manitoba (Usackis)	1	0	1	1	0	1	0	2	0	X	6
Yukon/Northwest Territories (Twa)	0	1	0	0	0	0	1	0	1	X	5

Team	1	2	3	4	5	6	7	8	9	10	Final
Prince Edward Island (MacDonald)	1	0	2	0	0	1	0	1	0	X	5
Northern Ontario (Tate)	0	2	0	2	1	0	3	0	1	X	9

Team	1	2	3	4	5	6	7	8	9	10	Final
Saskatchewan (Rogers)	0	1	0	0	0	0	0	2	0	1	4
Ontario (Savage)	1	0	0	1	0	0	0	0	1	0	3

Team	1	2	3	4	5	6	7	8	9	10	Final
Alberta (Reed)	0	1	0	0	1	0	0	0	3	0	5
Newfoundland (Hamilton)	1	0	0	1	0	2	0	1	0	1	6

=== Draw 2 ===
Sunday, March 6, 7:30 pm

Team	1	2	3	4	5	6	7	8	9	10	Final
Manitoba (Usackis)	0	0	0	1	0	0	1	0	X	X	2
Ontario (Savage)	0	1	1	0	3	1	0	2	X	X	8

Team	1	2	3	4	5	6	7	8	9	10	Final
Prince Edward Island (MacDonald)	2	0	0	1	0	0	1	1	0	0	5
New Brunswick (Mockler)	0	1	1	0	0	1	0	0	4	1	8

Team	1	2	3	4	5	6	7	8	9	10	Final
Nova Scotia (Fitzner)	0	0	0	1	0	1	0	1	0	0	3
British Columbia (Vinthers)	2	0	1	0	2	0	0	0	1	1	7

Team	1	2	3	4	5	6	7	8	9	10	Final
Quebec (Ursel)	1	0	1	1	0	1	2	0	1	X	7
Northern Ontario (Tate)	0	1	0	0	1	0	0	2	0	X	4

Team	1	2	3	4	5	6	7	8	9	10	11	Final
Yukon/Northwest Territories (Twa)	1	0	0	1	0	0	0	0	1	0	1	5
Saskatchewan (Rogers)	0	0	1	0	0	0	1	0	0	1	0	4

=== Draw 3 ===
Monday, March 7, 9:30 am

Team	1	2	3	4	5	6	7	8	9	10	Final
British Columbia (Vinthers)	0	1	0	1	0	2	1	0	2	1	8
Northern Ontario (Tate)	1	0	3	0	1	0	0	2	0	0	7

Team	1	2	3	4	5	6	7	8	9	10	Final
Manitoba (Usackis)	1	0	0	2	0	1	0	4	X	X	8
Alberta (Reed)	0	0	0	0	1	0	1	0	X	X	2

Team	1	2	3	4	5	6	7	8	9	10	Final
Ontario (Savage)	0	2	0	1	0	0	2	1	2	X	8
Newfoundland (Hamilton)	1	0	0	0	1	0	0	0	0	X	2

=== Draw 4 ===
Monday, March 7, 2:00 pm

Team	1	2	3	4	5	6	7	8	9	10	Final
Yukon/Northwest Territories (Twa)	1	0	1	1	0	2	0	1	0	1	7
Prince Edward Island (MacDonald)	0	1	0	0	1	0	1	0	1	0	4

Team	1	2	3	4	5	6	7	8	9	10	11	Final
Saskatchewan (Rogers)	0	0	2	0	1	0	2	0	0	2	0	7
Quebec (Ursel)	1	1	0	2	0	2	0	0	1	0	1	8

Team	1	2	3	4	5	6	7	8	9	10	Final
New Brunswick (Mockler)	0	3	0	0	1	0	0	0	2	X	6
Nova Scotia (Fitzner)	1	0	2	0	0	0	2	5	0	X	10

=== Draw 5 ===
Monday, March 7, 7:30 pm

Team	1	2	3	4	5	6	7	8	9	10	Final
Alberta (Reed)	0	0	3	0	2	2	1	1	0	X	9
Northern Ontario (Tate)	1	1	0	1	0	0	0	0	1	X	4

Team	1	2	3	4	5	6	7	8	9	10	Final
Nova Scotia (Fitzner)	1	0	1	0	0	0	1	0	1	0	4
Saskatchewan (Rogers)	0	1	0	1	1	0	0	1	0	1	5

Team	1	2	3	4	5	6	7	8	9	10	Final
Newfoundland (Hamilton)	0	0	2	0	1	0	1	0	1	X	5
New Brunswick (Mockler)	1	1	0	1	0	2	0	2	0	X	7

Team	1	2	3	4	5	6	7	8	9	10	Final
British Columbia (Vinthers)	1	1	2	0	1	0	2	1	0	X	8
Yukon/Northwest Territories (Twa)	0	0	0	1	0	3	0	0	1	X	5

Team	1	2	3	4	5	6	7	8	9	10	Final
Prince Edward Island (MacDonald)	0	0	1	0	0	0	1	0	0	X	2
Quebec (Ursel)	1	1	0	0	1	0	0	4	1	X	8

=== Draw 6 ===
Tuesday, March 8, 9:30 am

Team	1	2	3	4	5	6	7	8	9	10	Final
Saskatchewan (Rogers)	1	0	1	0	0	0	3	0	X	X	5
British Columbia (Vinthers)	0	2	0	3	3	0	0	4	X	X	12

Team	1	2	3	4	5	6	7	8	9	10	Final
Yukon/Northwest Territories (Twa)	0	0	0	0	1	0	1	0	1	0	3
Ontario (Savage)	1	0	1	2	0	2	0	1	0	1	8

Team	1	2	3	4	5	6	7	8	9	10	Final
Northern Ontario (Tate)	0	0	3	0	0	2	1	2	0	X	8
Newfoundland (Hamilton)	0	1	0	1	0	0	0	0	2	X	4

Team	1	2	3	4	5	6	7	8	9	10	11	12	Final
Nova Scotia (Fitzner)	0	2	0	0	4	1	2	1	0	0	0	0	10
Manitoba (Usackis)	2	0	2	2	0	0	0	0	3	1	0	1	11

Team	1	2	3	4	5	6	7	8	9	10	11	Final
Quebec (Ursel)	1	0	0	3	0	0	2	0	0	1	0	7
Alberta (Reed)	0	2	1	0	0	2	0	1	1	0	1	8

=== Draw 7 ===
Tuesday, March 8, 2:00 pm

Team	1	2	3	4	5	6	7	8	9	10	Final
Prince Edward Island (MacDonald)	0	0	0	0	0	0	0	0	X	X	0
Newfoundland (Hamilton)	0	1	2	0	1	4	1	2	X	X	11

Team	1	2	3	4	5	6	7	8	9	10	Final
British Columbia (Vinthers)	0	3	1	2	3	0	1	0	X	X	10
Ontario (Savage)	1	0	0	0	0	0	0	2	X	X	3

Team	1	2	3	4	5	6	7	8	9	10	Final
Yukon/Northwest Territories (Twa)	0	0	5	0	1	1	0	0	2	X	9
Nova Scotia (Fitzner)	1	0	0	1	0	0	1	0	0	X	3

Team	1	2	3	4	5	6	7	8	9	10	Final
Alberta (Reed)	1	0	2	1	3	1	0	2	X	X	10
New Brunswick (Mockler)	0	1	0	0	0	0	1	0	X	X	2

Team	1	2	3	4	5	6	7	8	9	10	Final
Saskatchewan (Rogers)	0	1	0	0	0	1	2	1	1	X	6
Manitoba (Usackis)	0	0	4	3	1	0	0	0	0	X	8

=== Draw 8 ===
Wednesday, March 9, 2:00 pm

Team	1	2	3	4	5	6	7	8	9	10	Final
Northern Ontario (Tate)	3	0	0	4	0	0	2	0	1	X	10
New Brunswick (Mockler)	0	0	2	0	1	1	0	1	0	X	5

Team	1	2	3	4	5	6	7	8	9	10	Final
Nova Scotia (Fitzner)	0	0	0	0	0	0	0	2	0	X	2
Ontario (Savage)	1	1	3	1	0	2	0	0	2	X	10

Team	1	2	3	4	5	6	7	8	9	10	Final
Alberta (Reed)	1	0	2	1	0	0	0	2	0	2	8
Prince Edward Island (MacDonald)	0	1	0	0	1	2	0	0	2	0	6

Team	1	2	3	4	5	6	7	8	9	10	Final
Newfoundland (Hamilton)	2	0	3	0	0	0	1	0	0	1	7
Quebec (Ursel)	0	1	0	0	2	1	0	2	0	0	6

Team	1	2	3	4	5	6	7	8	9	10	11	Final
British Columbia (Vinthers)	0	2	0	1	0	1	2	0	1	0	1	8
Manitoba (Usackis)	1	0	2	0	1	0	0	2	0	1	0	7

=== Draw 9 ===
Wednesday, March 9, 7:30 pm

Team	1	2	3	4	5	6	7	8	9	10	Final
Prince Edward Island (MacDonald)	1	0	0	0	0	0	1	0	1	0	3
Manitoba (Usackis)	0	1	0	0	1	0	0	1	0	1	4

Team	1	2	3	4	5	6	7	8	9	10	Final
Nova Scotia (Fitzner)	0	0	0	0	0	0	2	0	0	X	2
Alberta (Reed)	0	0	0	0	3	3	0	1	1	X	8

Team	1	2	3	4	5	6	7	8	9	10	Final
Northern Ontario (Tate)	1	0	1	0	0	0	0	1	0	X	3
Saskatchewan (Rogers)	0	2	0	0	1	1	1	0	1	X	6

Team	1	2	3	4	5	6	7	8	9	10	Final
Yukon/Northwest Territories (Twa)	1	0	0	0	0	1	0	2	X	X	4
Quebec (Ursel)	0	2	1	1	1	0	5	0	X	X	10

Team	1	2	3	4	5	6	7	8	9	10	Final
British Columbia (Vinthers)	0	0	1	0	0	3	0	3	0	1	8
New Brunswick (Mockler)	0	1	0	1	2	0	1	0	1	0	6

=== Draw 10 ===
Thursday, March 10, 2:00 pm

Team	1	2	3	4	5	6	7	8	9	10	Final
Northern Ontario (Tate)	1	1	0	2	2	1	2	2	X	X	11
Yukon/Northwest Territories (Twa)	0	0	1	0	0	0	0	0	X	X	1

Team	1	2	3	4	5	6	7	8	9	10	Final
Ontario (Savage)	0	0	1	0	0	0	0	1	X	X	2
Quebec (Ursel)	1	2	0	1	3	0	2	0	X	X	9

Team	1	2	3	4	5	6	7	8	9	10	Final
New Brunswick (Mockler)	2	0	2	0	0	0	1	0	0	X	5
Saskatchewan (Rogers)	0	2	0	1	1	3	0	0	3	X	10

Team	1	2	3	4	5	6	7	8	9	10	Final
Newfoundland (Hamilton)	0	1	0	1	0	2	0	1	0	0	5
Nova Scotia (Fitzner)	1	0	0	0	2	0	2	0	0	1	6

Team	1	2	3	4	5	6	7	8	9	10	11	Final
British Columbia (Vinthers)	2	0	0	1	1	0	1	0	0	1	2	8
Prince Edward Island (MacDonald)	0	1	1	0	0	2	0	0	2	0	0	6

=== Draw 11 ===
Thursday, March 10, 7:30 pm

Team	1	2	3	4	5	6	7	8	9	10	Final
Prince Edward Island (MacDonald)	1	0	1	1	0	0	0	0	2	X	5
Nova Scotia (Fitzner)	1	0	0	0	1	0	1	0	0	X	2

Team	1	2	3	4	5	6	7	8	9	10	Final
Ontario (Savage)	0	2	1	1	0	2	0	0	1	1	8
Northern Ontario (Tate)	2	0	0	0	1	0	2	2	0	0	7

Team	1	2	3	4	5	6	7	8	9	10	11	Final
Manitoba (Usackis)	0	4	0	0	1	0	1	1	1	0	0	8
Newfoundland (Hamilton)	0	0	3	2	0	2	0	0	0	1	1	9

Team	1	2	3	4	5	6	7	8	9	10	11	Final
Alberta (Reed)	0	2	1	0	1	0	0	0	2	0	1	7
British Columbia (Vinthers)	0	0	0	1	0	1	1	2	0	1	0	6

Team	1	2	3	4	5	6	7	8	9	10	Final
New Brunswick (Mockler)	0	0	2	1	0	0	0	0	0	X	3
Yukon/Northwest Territories (Twa)	1	1	0	0	0	2	0	2	1	X	7

=== Draw 12 ===
Friday, March 11, 2:00 pm

Team	1	2	3	4	5	6	7	8	9	10	Final
Manitoba (Usackis)	0	2	0	4	1	2	1	0	X	X	10
Northern Ontario (Tate)	0	0	0	0	0	0	0	1	X	X	1

Team	1	2	3	4	5	6	7	8	9	10	Final
Newfoundland (Hamilton)	0	0	0	2	0	1	0	1	3	1	8
Saskatchewan (Rogers)	1	1	1	0	1	0	3	0	0	0	7

Team	1	2	3	4	5	6	7	8	9	10	Final
Quebec (Ursel)	2	0	1	0	3	0	2	0	1	X	9
British Columbia (Vinthers)	0	2	0	1	0	2	0	1	0	X	6

Team	1	2	3	4	5	6	7	8	9	10	Final
Alberta (Reed)	1	0	0	0	0	2	0	0	0	X	3
Yukon/Northwest Territories (Twa)	0	1	1	1	2	0	2	1	2	X	10

Team	1	2	3	4	5	6	7	8	9	10	Final
Ontario (Savage)	1	0	2	1	1	0	2	0	1	X	8
Prince Edward Island (MacDonald)	0	2	0	0	0	1	0	1	0	X	4

=== Draw 13 ===
Friday, March 11, 7:30 pm

Team	1	2	3	4	5	6	7	8	9	10	Final
Quebec (Ursel)	1	0	1	1	0	2	2	0	X	X	7
Manitoba (Usackis)	0	1	0	0	0	0	0	1	X	X	2

Team	1	2	3	4	5	6	7	8	9	10	Final
Saskatchewan (Rogers)	0	0	0	0	5	0	0	0	4	X	9
Alberta (Reed)	0	1	0	0	1	0	0	0	0	X	3

Team	1	2	3	4	5	6	7	8	9	10	Final
New Brunswick (Mockler)	1	0	0	0	0	2	0	0	0	X	3
Ontario (Savage)	0	1	0	2	2	0	0	0	2	X	7

Team	1	2	3	4	5	6	7	8	9	10	Final
Northern Ontario (Tate)	0	1	0	0	0	0	1	0	0	X	2
Nova Scotia (Fitzner)	0	0	0	1	0	1	0	1	1	X	4

Team	1	2	3	4	5	6	7	8	9	10	Final
Newfoundland (Hamilton)	1	0	0	1	0	2	0	0	1	X	5
British Columbia (Vinthers)	0	0	1	0	1	0	1	0	0	X	3

=== Draw 14 ===
Saturday, March 12, 1:30 pm

Team	1	2	3	4	5	6	7	8	9	10	Final
Ontario (Savage)	0	2	1	0	3	1	0	1	X	X	8
Alberta (Reed)	0	0	0	1	0	0	1	0	X	X	2

Team	1	2	3	4	5	6	7	8	9	10	Final
New Brunswick (Mockler)	3	0	2	1	0	2	0	0	2	0	10
Manitoba (Usackis)	0	3	0	0	2	0	1	2	0	1	9

Team	1	2	3	4	5	6	7	8	9	10	Final
Saskatchewan (Rogers)	2	0	1	0	1	0	0	2	0	0	6
Prince Edward Island (MacDonald)	0	2	0	2	0	0	1	0	1	1	7

Team	1	2	3	4	5	6	7	8	9	10	Final
Yukon/Northwest Territories (Twa)	1	0	3	0	0	0	1	0	1	X	6
Newfoundland (Hamilton)	0	1	0	3	1	1	0	2	0	X	8

Team	1	2	3	4	5	6	7	8	9	10	Final
Quebec (Ursel)	1	0	3	0	1	0	1	1	0	X	7
Nova Scotia (Fitzner)	0	1	0	1	0	1	0	0	1	X	4

== Awards ==
=== All-Star Team ===
The media selected the following curlers as All-Stars.

Position	Name	Team
Skip	Jim Ursel (2)	Quebec
Third	Art Lobel	Quebec
Second	Lionel Stokes	Yukon/Northwest Territories
Lead	Bob Collez	Manitoba

=== Ross G.L. Harstone Award ===
The Ross Harstone Award was presented to the player chosen by their fellow peers as the curler who best represented Harstone's high ideals of good sportsmanship, observance of the rules, exemplary conduct and curling ability.

Name	Team	Position
Joe Power Jr.	Newfoundland	Third
