= 2005 Canadian Senior Curling Championships =

- Host city: East St. Paul, Manitoba
- Arena: East St. Paul Curling Club
- Dates: March 19–27
- Men's winner: Alberta
- Skip: Les Rogers
- Third: Marc Wirth
- Second: Ken McLean
- Lead: Millard Evans
- Finalist: Northern Ontario
- Women's winner: Ontario
- Skip: Joyce Potter
- Third: Muriel Potter
- Second: Janelle Sadler
- Lead: Bonnie Morris
- Finalist: British Columbia

The 2005 Canadian Senior Curling Championships were held March 19 to 27 at the East St. Paul Curling Club in East St. Paul, Manitoba. The winning teams represented Canada at the 2006 World Senior Curling Championships.

== Men's ==
=== Teams ===
Province / Territory	Skip	Third	Second	Lead
British Columbia	Jamie McTavish	Steven Thorson	Stephen Lambert	Pierre Gallant
Alberta	Les Rogers	Marv Wirth	Ken McLean	Millard Evans
Saskatchewan	Eugene Hritzuk	Larry Ruf	Jim Wilson	Dave Folk
Manitoba	Doug Harrison	Howard Restall (skip)	Doug Holmes	Bill Hodgson
Northern Ontario	Al Harnden	Mike Sagle	Frank Caputo	Brian Benford
Ontario	Frank Gowman	Bruce McRae	Ken Cox	Jim Corrigan
Quebec	ReJean Pare	Marcel Bouchard	Carol Bellemarre	Jean-Marie Bouchard
New Brunswick	David Sullivan	Charlie Sullivan Sr.	Thomas Rubec	Ken Smith
Nova Scotia	Don MacIntosh	Bob Teale	Peter Neily	Larry Higgins
Prince Edward Island	Ted MacFadyen	Bill MacFadyen	Sandy Foy	Mike Coady
Newfoundland and Labrador	Garry Pinsent	Carl Hynes	Roy Hodder	Wilf Parsons
Yukon/Northwest Territories	Paul Hunter	Craig Tuton	John Yeulet	Pat Molloy

=== Standings ===
Locale	Skip	W	L
Saskatchewan	Eugene Hritzuk	9	2
Northern Ontario	Alan Harnden	9	2
Alberta	Les Rogers	9	2
New Brunswick	David Sullivan	8	3
Ontario	Frank Gowman	7	4
Manitoba	Howard Restall	5	6
Yukon/Northwest Territories	Paul Hunter	5	6
Nova Scotia	Don MacIntosh	4	7
Prince Edward Island	Ted MacFadyen	4	7
Quebec	Rejean Pare	2	9
Newfoundland and Labrador	Garry Pinsent	2	9
British Columbia	Jamie McTavish	2	9

=== Results ===
==== Draw 1 ====
Sheet B	1	2	3	4	5	6	7	8	9	10	Final
Saskatchewan (Hritzuk)	1	0	0	0	1	0	0	1	0	X	3
Manitoba (Restall)	0	3	0	0	0	1	0	0	3	X	7

Sheet D	1	2	3	4	5	6	7	8	9	10	Final
Newfoundland and Labrador (Pinsent)	0	0	0	1	1	1	0	1	0	0	4
Yukon/Northwest Territories (Hunter)	0	0	3	0	0	0	1	0	2	2	8

Sheet F	1	2	3	4	5	6	7	8	9	10	11	Final
Northern Ontario (Harnden)	0	0	4	0	0	2	0	0	1	0	1	8
Quebec (Pare)	1	0	0	1	2	0	0	1	0	2	0	7

==== Draw 2 ====
Sheet B	1	2	3	4	5	6	7	8	9	10	Final
New Brunswick (Sullivan)	2	0	1	0	0	1	3	1	0	0	8
Nova Scotia (MacIntosh)	0	4	0	1	0	0	0	0	1	1	7

Sheet D	1	2	3	4	5	6	7	8	9	10	Final
Prince Edward Island (MacFadyen)	0	2	0	0	3	1	0	1	1	X	8
British Columbia (McTavish)	1	0	1	0	0	0	2	0	0	X	4

Sheet F	1	2	3	4	5	6	7	8	9	10	Final
Alberta (Rogers)	2	0	2	0	0	0	0	2	2	X	8
Ontario (Gowman)	0	2	0	1	1	0	1	0	0	X	5

==== Draw 3 ====
Sheet A	1	2	3	4	5	6	7	8	9	10	Final
Manitoba (Restall)	2	0	0	1	0	1	0	0	3	1	8
Quebec (Pare)	0	1	1	0	1	0	1	1	0	0	5

Sheet C	1	2	3	4	5	6	7	8	9	10	Final
Newfoundland and Labrador (Pinsent)	0	0	1	0	1	0	0	0	X	X	2
Northern Ontario (Harnden)	0	1	0	3	0	2	1	1	X	X	8

Sheet E	1	2	3	4	5	6	7	8	9	10	Final
Yukon/Northwest Territories (Hunter)	2	0	5	0	1	0	0	1	2	0	11
Saskatchewan (Hritzuk)	0	1	0	3	0	3	1	0	0	2	10

==== Draw 4 ====
Sheet A	1	2	3	4	5	6	7	8	9	10	Final
British Columbia (McTavish)	0	1	0	1	0	0	1	0	2	X	5
Ontario (Gowman)	1	0	2	0	1	2	0	1	0	X	7

Sheet C	1	2	3	4	5	6	7	8	9	10	Final
New Brunswick (Sullivan)	1	0	1	0	1	0	0	1	X	X	4
Alberta (Rogers)	0	4	0	2	0	3	2	0	X	X	11

Sheet E	1	2	3	4	5	6	7	8	9	10	11	Final
Nova Scotia (MacIntosh)	2	0	1	0	0	0	1	1	0	0	1	6
Prince Edward Island (MacFadyen)	0	1	0	0	0	1	0	0	1	2	0	5

==== Draw 5 ====
Sheet B	1	2	3	4	5	6	7	8	9	10	Final
Ontario (Gowman)	0	1	0	0	1	0	1	1	0	X	4
New Brunswick (Sullivan)	2	0	2	1	0	1	0	0	3	X	9

Sheet D	1	2	3	4	5	6	7	8	9	10	Final
Alberta (Rogers)	2	0	1	1	0	1	0	1	0	X	6
Prince Edward Island (MacFadyen)	0	1	0	0	1	0	1	0	1	X	4

Sheet F	1	2	3	4	5	6	7	8	9	10	Final
British Columbia (McTavish)	1	0	1	1	0	1	1	0	1	0	6
Nova Scotia (MacIntosh)	0	3	0	0	2	0	0	0	0	2	7

==== Draw 6 ====
Sheet B	1	2	3	4	5	6	7	8	9	10	Final
Quebec (Pare)	0	1	0	2	0	0	0	2	0	2	7
Newfoundland and Labrador (Pinsent)	0	0	1	0	2	0	0	0	3	0	6

Sheet D	1	2	3	4	5	6	7	8	9	10	Final
Manitoba (Restall)	0	0	2	0	0	4	0	0	0	X	6
Yukon/Northwest Territories (Hunter)	0	1	0	0	1	0	0	1	0	X	3

Sheet F	1	2	3	4	5	6	7	8	9	10	Final
Northern Ontario (Harnden)	0	1	0	1	0	2	0	0	X	X	4
Saskatchewan (Hritzuk)	1	0	4	0	2	0	0	2	X	X	9

==== Draw 7 ====
Sheet A	1	2	3	4	5	6	7	8	9	10	Final
Nova Scotia (MacIntosh)	0	2	0	0	0	1	0	0	0	0	3
Alberta (Rogers)	1	0	0	0	1	0	1	1	1	3	8

Sheet C	1	2	3	4	5	6	7	8	9	10	11	Final
Prince Edward Island (MacFadyen)	1	0	0	1	1	0	0	2	0	1	0	6
Ontario (Gowman)	0	2	1	0	0	2	0	0	1	0	1	7

Sheet E	1	2	3	4	5	6	7	8	9	10	Final
New Brunswick (Sullivan)	2	0	0	3	0	1	0	1	X	X	7
British Columbia (McTavish)	0	1	0	0	0	0	1	0	X	X	2

==== Draw 8 ====
Sheet A	1	2	3	4	5	6	7	8	9	10	Final
Yukon/Northwest Territories (Hunter)	2	0	0	1	1	1	0	0	1	0	6
Northern Ontario (Harnden)	0	4	1	0	0	0	2	1	0	1	9

Sheet C	1	2	3	4	5	6	7	8	9	10	Final
Newfoundland and Labrador (Pinsent)	0	0	1	0	0	0	0	0	0	X	1
Manitoba (Restall)	1	0	0	2	0	0	0	1	1	X	5

Sheet E	1	2	3	4	5	6	7	8	9	10	Final
Saskatchewan (Hritzuk)	0	0	2	1	0	0	1	0	0	1	5
Quebec (Pare)	0	0	0	0	0	1	0	2	0	0	3

==== Draw 9 ====
Sheet A	1	2	3	4	5	6	7	8	9	10	Final
Saskatchewan (Hritzuk)	2	1	2	3	X	X	X	X	X	X	8
Newfoundland and Labrador (Pinsent)	0	0	0	0	X	X	X	X	X	X	0

Sheet C	1	2	3	4	5	6	7	8	9	10	Final
Quebec (Pare)	0	0	1	1	0	0	1	0	X	X	3
Yukon/Northwest Territories (Hunter)	0	1	0	0	3	3	0	2	X	X	9

Sheet E	1	2	3	4	5	6	7	8	9	10	11	Final
Northern Ontario (Harnden)	0	0	2	1	0	0	2	0	1	0	1	7
Manitoba (Restall)	1	0	0	0	1	1	0	2	0	1	0	6

==== Draw 10 ====
Sheet B	1	2	3	4	5	6	7	8	9	10	Final
Prince Edward Island (MacFadyen)	0	0	0	2	2	0	0	3	0	X	7
New Brunswick (Sullivan)	0	0	1	0	0	0	1	0	0	X	2

Sheet C	1	2	3	4	5	6	7	8	9	10	Final
Ontario (Gowman)	1	0	1	0	3	1	0	2	1	X	9
Nova Scotia (MacIntosh)	0	2	0	1	0	0	1	0	0	X	4

Sheet E	1	2	3	4	5	6	7	8	9	10	Final
Alberta (Rogers)	1	0	0	0	4	1	3	0	X	X	9
British Columbia (McTavish)	0	1	0	2	0	0	0	1	X	X	4

==== Draw 11 ====
Sheet A	1	2	3	4	5	6	7	8	9	10	11	Final
Saskatchewan (Hritzuk)	1	0	1	0	2	1	0	1	0	0	1	7
New Brunswick (Sullivan)	0	1	0	1	0	0	2	0	1	1	0	6

Sheet B	1	2	3	4	5	6	7	8	9	10	Final
Manitoba (Restall)	0	0	0	0	0	1	1	0	X	X	2
Alberta (Rogers)	0	1	2	1	1	0	0	3	X	X	8

Sheet C	1	2	3	4	5	6	7	8	9	10	Final
Yukon/Northwest Territories (Hunter)	0	0	0	2	0	1	1	0	X	X	4
British Columbia (McTavish)	2	1	1	0	2	0	0	3	X	X	9

Sheet D	1	2	3	4	5	6	7	8	9	10	Final
Northern Ontario (Harnden)	0	2	0	1	0	3	0	1	0	0	7
Ontario (Gowman)	0	0	1	0	2	0	1	0	1	1	6

Sheet E	1	2	3	4	5	6	7	8	9	10	Final
Newfoundland and Labrador (Pinsent)	0	1	0	0	1	0	0	0	2	X	4
Nova Scotia (MacIntosh)	0	0	1	1	0	0	3	2	0	X	7

Sheet F	1	2	3	4	5	6	7	8	9	10	11	Final
Quebec (Pare)	0	2	0	2	0	2	1	1	0	0	0	8
Prince Edward Island (MacFadyen)	4	0	2	0	1	0	0	0	0	1	2	10

==== Draw 13 ====
Sheet A	1	2	3	4	5	6	7	8	9	10	Final
Alberta (Rogers)	0	0	0	0	0	2	0	0	1	1	4
Northern Ontario (Harnden)	0	0	0	0	1	0	3	1	0	0	5

Sheet B	1	2	3	4	5	6	7	8	9	10	Final
New Brunswick (Sullivan)	2	1	0	0	1	0	0	1	2	X	7
Newfoundland and Labrador (Pinsent)	0	0	1	1	0	0	1	0	0	X	3

Sheet C	1	2	3	4	5	6	7	8	9	10	Final
Prince Edward Island (MacFadyen)	0	0	1	0	0	0	1	0	X	X	2
Saskatchewan (Hritzuk)	0	2	0	3	1	1	0	1	X	X	8

Sheet D	1	2	3	4	5	6	7	8	9	10	Final
British Columbia (McTavish)	2	0	0	3	0	1	1	0	1	X	8
Manitoba (Restall)	0	0	2	0	2	0	0	2	0	X	6

Sheet E	1	2	3	4	5	6	7	8	9	10	Final
Ontario (Gowman)	1	0	0	1	0	1	0	1	0	1	5
Quebec (Pare)	0	0	1	0	1	0	0	0	1	0	3

Sheet F	1	2	3	4	5	6	7	8	9	10	Final
Nova Scotia (MacIntosh)	0	4	0	0	0	1	1	0	X	X	6
Yukon/Northwest Territories (Hunter)	2	0	2	2	3	0	0	4	X	X	13

==== Draw 15 ====
Sheet A	1	2	3	4	5	6	7	8	9	10	Final
Nova Scotia (MacIntosh)	0	2	0	0	0	2	1	0	0	2	7
Quebec (Pare)	1	0	1	1	1	0	0	2	0	0	6

Sheet B	1	2	3	4	5	6	7	8	9	10	Final
Ontario (Gowman)	2	0	3	1	0	0	0	2	X	X	8
Yukon/Northwest Territories (Hunter)	0	2	0	0	0	1	1	0	X	X	4

Sheet C	1	2	3	4	5	6	7	8	9	10	Final
New Brunswick (Sullivan)	4	0	1	1	0	2	0	0	0	1	9
Northern Ontario (Harnden)	0	3	0	0	1	0	2	1	1	0	8

Sheet D	1	2	3	4	5	6	7	8	9	10	Final
British Columbia (McTavish)	4	0	1	0	1	0	1	0	1	1	9
Saskatchewan (Hritzuk)	0	2	0	1	0	3	0	4	0	0	10

Sheet E	1	2	3	4	5	6	7	8	9	10	Final
Prince Edward Island (MacFadyen)	1	0	1	1	0	3	0	1	0	1	8
Manitoba (Restall)	0	2	0	0	2	0	2	0	0	0	6

Sheet F	1	2	3	4	5	6	7	8	9	10	Final
Alberta (Rogers)	1	0	0	4	0	2	0	1	0	X	8
Newfoundland and Labrador (Pinsent)	0	0	2	0	2	0	0	0	1	X	5

==== Draw 17 ====
Sheet A	1	2	3	4	5	6	7	8	9	10	Final
Yukon/Northwest Territories (Hunter)	0	0	0	1	1	0	4	0	1	X	7
Prince Edward Island (MacFadyen)	0	0	1	0	0	1	0	2	0	X	4

Sheet B	1	2	3	4	5	6	7	8	9	10	Final
Saskatchewan (Hritzuk)	0	0	0	0	0	1	0	2	0	X	3
Alberta (Rogers)	0	0	0	0	0	0	1	0	0	X	1

Sheet C	1	2	3	4	5	6	7	8	9	10	Final
Quebec (Pare)	0	1	1	1	0	3	0	1	X	X	7
British Columbia (McTavish)	0	0	0	0	1	0	1	0	X	X	2

Sheet D	1	2	3	4	5	6	7	8	9	10	Final
Northern Ontario (Harnden)	0	1	0	0	1	0	5	1	X	X	8
Nova Scotia (MacIntosh)	0	0	0	2	0	1	0	0	X	X	3

Sheet E	1	2	3	4	5	6	7	8	9	10	Final
Newfoundland and Labrador (Pinsent)	1	0	0	0	1	0	0	3	0	0	5
Ontario (Gowman)	0	1	1	0	0	2	0	0	0	2	6

Sheet F	1	2	3	4	5	6	7	8	9	10	Final
Manitoba (Restall)	0	1	0	2	0	1	0	X	X	X	4
New Brunswick (Sullivan)	3	0	2	0	4	0	1	X	X	X	10

==== Draw 19 ====
Sheet A	1	2	3	4	5	6	7	8	9	10	Final
Newfoundland and Labrador (Pinsent)	1	1	0	1	0	0	0	4	3	X	10
British Columbia (McTavish)	0	0	1	0	2	0	1	0	0	X	4

Sheet B	1	2	3	4	5	6	7	8	9	10	Final
Northern Ontario (Harnden)	2	1	1	0	1	0	1	0	3	X	9
Prince Edward Island (MacFadyen)	0	0	0	0	0	2	0	3	0	X	5

Sheet C	1	2	3	4	5	6	7	8	9	10	Final
Manitoba (Restall)	0	2	0	0	0	2	0	0	0	2	6
Nova Scotia (MacIntosh)	0	0	0	0	1	0	2	2	0	0	5

Sheet D	1	2	3	4	5	6	7	8	9	10	11	Final
Quebec (Pare)	0	2	1	0	1	0	1	0	2	0	0	7
New Brunswick (Sullivan)	1	0	0	1	0	3	0	1	0	1	1	8

Sheet E	1	2	3	4	5	6	7	8	9	10	Final
Yukon/Northwest Territories (Hunter)	0	0	0	0	1	1	0	1	0	X	3
Alberta (Rogers)	0	2	0	1	0	0	2	0	3	X	8

Sheet F	1	2	3	4	5	6	7	8	9	10	Final
Saskatchewan (Hritzuk)	2	0	0	0	2	1	0	2	0	X	7
Ontario (Gowman)	0	0	1	1	0	0	1	0	0	X	3

==== Draw 21 ====
Sheet A	1	2	3	4	5	6	7	8	9	10	Final
Ontario (Gowman)	3	0	2	0	3	1	X	X	X	X	9
Manitoba (Restall)	0	2	0	1	0	0	X	X	X	X	3

Sheet B	1	2	3	4	5	6	7	8	9	10	Final
British Columbia (McTavish)	0	0	1	0	0	1	0	X	X	X	2
Northern Ontario (Harnden)	1	0	0	3	2	0	3	X	X	X	9

Sheet C	1	2	3	4	5	6	7	8	9	10	11	Final
Nova Scotia (MacIntosh)	2	0	0	0	0	0	1	0	0	3	0	6
Saskatchewan (Hritzuk)	0	0	0	1	2	1	0	1	1	0	1	7

Sheet D	1	2	3	4	5	6	7	8	9	10	Final
Alberta (Rogers)	0	1	2	1	0	1	0	2	X	X	7
Quebec (Pare)	0	0	0	0	0	0	1	0	X	X	1

Sheet E	1	2	3	4	5	6	7	8	9	10	Final
New Brunswick (Sullivan)	1	0	1	0	1	0	3	0	2	X	8
Yukon/Northwest Territories (Hunter)	0	1	0	0	0	1	0	3	0	X	5

Sheet F	1	2	3	4	5	6	7	8	9	10	Final
Prince Edward Island (MacFadyen)	4	1	0	1	0	0	1	0	0	0	7
Newfoundland and Labrador (Pinsent)	0	0	2	0	3	1	0	1	0	1	8

=== Playoffs ===
Semifinal		Final
Northern Ontario	4
Alberta	6	Saskatchewan	5
		Alberta	6

==== Semifinal ====
Sheet D	1	2	3	4	5	6	7	8	9	10	Final
Alberta (Rogers)	0	0	0	2	0	0	3	0	0	1	6
Northern Ontario (Harnden)	0	0	2	0	2	0	0	0	0	0	4

Player percentages
Alberta		Northern Ontario	
Millard Evans	74%	Brian Benford	90%
Ken McLean	89%	Frank Caputo	88%
Marv Wirth	95%	Mike Sagle	59%
Les Rogers	88%	Alan Harnden	75%
Total	86%	Total	78%

==== Final ====
Sheet B	1	2	3	4	5	6	7	8	9	10	Final
Alberta (Rogers)	0	2	0	2	0	0	0	1	0	1	6
Saskatchewan (Hritzuk)	1	0	1	0	1	2	0	0	0	0	5

Player percentages
Alberta		Saskatchewan	
Millard Evans	84%	Dave Folk	85%
Ken McLean	85%	Jim Wilson	79%
Marv Wirth	94%	Larry Ruf	84%
Les Rogers	82%	Eugene Hritzuk	69%
Total	86%	Total	79%

== Women's ==
=== Teams ===
Province / Territory	Skip	Third	Second	Lead
British Columbia	Kathy Smiley	Kerri Miller	Rita Imai	Linda Brunn
Alberta	Simone Handfield	Jean Slemko	Dorothy Sutton	Judy Erickson
Saskatchewan	Crystal Frisk	Anita Ford	Randi Kelly	Dawne Obleman
Manitoba	Linda Van Daele	Betty Couling	Evelyn Clegg	Jean Ungarian
Northern Ontario	Brenda Johnston	Anne Harris	Jan Towns	Maymar Gemmell
Ontario	Joyce Potter	Muriel Potter	Janelle Sadler	Bonnie Morris
Quebec	Diane Lemieux	Lucie Lalonde	Eunice Golphin	Elizabeth Quesnel
New Brunswick	Sharon Levesque	Debbi Dickeson (skip)	Shawn Stubbert	Carol Patterson
Nova Scotia	Sue-Anne Bartlett	Penny LaRocque	Karen Hennigar	Marjorie MacKay
Prince Edward Island	Barbara Currie	Karen MacDonald	Helen MacDonald	Dawn MacFadyen
Newfoundland and Labrador	Jean Rockwell	Diane Keating	Joan Dodge	Cynthia Mills
Northwest Territories/Yukon	Sandy Penkala	Margaret Begg	Gail Daniels	Marie Coe

=== Standings ===
Locale	Skip	W	L
British Columbia	Kathy Smiley	9	2
Ontario	Joyce Potter	9	2
New Brunswick	Debbi Dickeson	7	4
Northern Ontario	Brenda Johnston	7	4
Nova Scotia	Sue-Anne Bartlett	7	4
Manitoba	Linda Van Daele	6	5
Northwest Territories/Yukon	Sandy Penkala	5	6
Alberta	Simone Handfield	5	6
Prince Edward Island	Barb Currie	3	8
Quebec	Diane Lemieux	3	8
Newfoundland and Labrador	Jean Rockwell	2	9
Saskatchewan	Crystal Frisk	2	9

=== Results ===
==== Draw 1 ====
Sheet A	1	2	3	4	5	6	7	8	9	10	Final
New Brunswick (Dickeson)	1	0	3	1	1	0	3	0	X	X	9
Nova Scotia (Bartlett)	0	1	0	0	0	2	0	2	X	X	5

Sheet C	1	2	3	4	5	6	7	8	9	10	Final
Quebec (Lemieux)	1	1	0	0	0	1	0	2	0	X	5
British Columbia (Smiley)	0	0	2	2	0	0	5	0	3	X	12

Sheet E	1	2	3	4	5	6	7	8	9	10	11	Final
Ontario (Potter)	0	2	1	0	1	0	1	0	2	0	1	8
Alberta (Handfield)	1	0	0	2	0	2	0	1	0	1	0	7

==== Draw 2 ====
Sheet A	1	2	3	4	5	6	7	8	9	10	Final
Prince Edward Island (Currie)	4	3	2	2	4	1	X	X	X	X	16
Newfoundland and Labrador (Rockwell)	0	0	0	0	0	0	X	X	X	X	0

Sheet C	1	2	3	4	5	6	7	8	9	10	Final
Manitoba (Van Daele)	0	3	1	2	0	1	0	2	X	X	9
Saskatchewan (Frisk)	0	0	0	0	0	0	1	0	X	X	1

Sheet E	1	2	3	4	5	6	7	8	9	10	Final
Northwest Territories/Yukon (Penkala)	0	1	0	0	3	0	3	3	X	X	10
Northern Ontario (Johnston)	0	0	2	0	0	1	0	0	X	X	3

==== Draw 3 ====
Sheet B	1	2	3	4	5	6	7	8	9	10	Final
Quebec (Lemieux)	2	1	0	0	1	0	0	1	0	X	5
Ontario (Potter)	0	0	2	1	0	4	2	0	1	X	10

Sheet D	1	2	3	4	5	6	7	8	9	10	Final
British Columbia (Smiley)	0	1	0	0	0	0	1	1	0	0	3
New Brunswick (Dickeson)	0	0	0	1	0	1	0	0	0	2	4

Sheet F	1	2	3	4	5	6	7	8	9	10	11	Final
Nova Scotia (Bartlett)	0	1	1	0	1	0	1	0	1	1	0	6
Alberta (Handfield)	0	0	0	1	0	2	0	3	0	0	1	7

==== Draw 4 ====
Sheet B	1	2	3	4	5	6	7	8	9	10	11	Final
Manitoba (Van Daele)	1	0	1	0	2	0	2	0	0	2	0	8
Northern Ontario (Johnston)	0	2	0	2	0	1	0	0	3	0	1	9

Sheet D	1	2	3	4	5	6	7	8	9	10	Final
Prince Edward Island (Currie)	0	1	2	0	1	0	2	3	X	X	9
Saskatchewan (Frisk)	1	0	0	1	0	1	0	0	X	X	3

Sheet F	1	2	3	4	5	6	7	8	9	10	Final
Newfoundland and Labrador (Rockwell)	2	0	0	1	0	2	1	0	1	2	9
Northwest Territories/Yukon (Penkala)	0	3	1	0	2	0	0	1	0	0	7

==== Draw 5 ====
Sheet A	1	2	3	4	5	6	7	8	9	10	Final
Northern Ontario (Johnston)	0	0	1	1	0	0	2	1	0	1	6
Prince Edward Island (Currie)	1	1	0	0	1	0	0	0	1	0	4

Sheet C	1	2	3	4	5	6	7	8	9	10	Final
Northwest Territories/Yukon (Penkala)	1	2	0	1	2	0	2	0	0	1	9
Manitoba (Van Daele)	0	0	4	0	0	2	0	1	1	0	8

Sheet E	1	2	3	4	5	6	7	8	9	10	Final
Saskatchewan (Frisk)	2	0	0	1	1	0	0	0	X	X	4
Newfoundland and Labrador (Rockwell)	0	1	4	0	0	1	2	2	X	X	10

==== Draw 6 ====
Sheet A	1	2	3	4	5	6	7	8	9	10	Final
Alberta (Handfield)	2	0	2	0	3	0	1	0	1	0	9
British Columbia (Smiley)	0	2	0	1	0	4	0	0	0	3	10

Sheet C	1	2	3	4	5	6	7	8	9	10	Final
Ontario (Potter)	0	0	0	1	0	2	1	0	1	0	5
Nova Scotia (Bartlett)	0	1	0	0	2	0	0	2	0	2	7

Sheet E	1	2	3	4	5	6	7	8	9	10	Final
New Brunswick (Dickeson)	0	3	0	1	0	1	0	1	0	1	7
Quebec (Lemieux)	2	0	1	0	2	0	2	0	1	0	8

==== Draw 7 ====
Sheet B	1	2	3	4	5	6	7	8	9	10	Final
Prince Edward Island (Currie)	1	0	0	0	0	2	0	0	X	X	3
Northwest Territories/Yukon (Penkala)	0	0	2	1	1	0	2	3	X	X	9

Sheet D	1	2	3	4	5	6	7	8	9	10	Final
Newfoundland and Labrador (Rockwell)	1	1	0	0	0	0	X	X	X	X	2
Manitoba (Van Daele)	0	0	2	3	2	2	X	X	X	X	9

Sheet F	1	2	3	4	5	6	7	8	9	10	Final
Saskatchewan (Frisk)	3	0	1	0	0	0	0	2	0	X	6
Northern Ontario (Johnston)	0	3	0	3	1	1	2	0	5	X	15

==== Draw 8 ====
Sheet B	1	2	3	4	5	6	7	8	9	10	Final
Quebec (Lemieux)	0	0	0	1	0	0	1	0	X	X	2
Nova Scotia (Bartlett)	1	1	1	0	3	1	0	3	X	X	10

Sheet D	1	2	3	4	5	6	7	8	9	10	Final
New Brunswick (Dickeson)	0	1	0	0	3	0	1	3	0	3	11
Alberta (Handfield)	1	0	0	2	0	2	0	0	1	0	6

Sheet F	1	2	3	4	5	6	7	8	9	10	Final
British Columbia (Smiley)	0	3	0	2	1	0	1	1	2	X	10
Ontario (Potter)	1	0	3	0	0	1	0	0	0	X	5

==== Draw 9 ====
Sheet B	1	2	3	4	5	6	7	8	9	10	Final
Alberta (Handfield)	2	0	1	0	4	0	3	3	X	X	13
Quebec (Lemieux)	0	2	0	1	0	3	0	0	X	X	6

Sheet D	1	2	3	4	5	6	7	8	9	10	11	Final
Nova Scotia (Bartlett)	3	0	0	2	1	0	0	1	0	1	1	9
British Columbia (Smiley)	0	2	1	0	0	2	2	0	1	0	0	8

Sheet F	1	2	3	4	5	6	7	8	9	10	Final
Ontario (Potter)	0	2	1	0	2	1	0	4	X	X	10
New Brunswick (Dickeson)	1	0	0	1	0	0	2	0	X	X	4

==== Draw 10 ====
Sheet A	1	2	3	4	5	6	7	8	9	10	11	Final
Northern Ontario (Johnston)	2	0	2	3	1	0	1	2	0	0	2	13
Newfoundland and Labrador (Rockwell)	0	2	0	0	0	5	0	0	3	1	0	11

Sheet D	1	2	3	4	5	6	7	8	9	10	Final
Northwest Territories/Yukon (Penkala)	0	0	0	0	1	0	2	1	0	1	5
Saskatchewan (Frisk)	0	0	0	1	0	1	0	0	1	0	3

Sheet F	1	2	3	4	5	6	7	8	9	10	Final
Manitoba (Van Daele)	3	0	2	5	3	0	X	X	X	X	13
Prince Edward Island (Currie)	0	1	0	0	0	0	X	X	X	X	1

==== Draw 12 ====
Sheet A	1	2	3	4	5	6	7	8	9	10	Final
Nova Scotia (Bartlett)	2	0	2	0	2	1	1	1	X	X	9
Northwest Territories/Yukon (Penkala)	0	0	0	1	0	0	0	0	X	X	1

Sheet B	1	2	3	4	5	6	7	8	9	10	Final
British Columbia (Smiley)	0	2	0	1	0	3	4	0	4	X	14
Saskatchewan (Frisk)	0	0	0	0	2	0	0	3	0	X	5

Sheet C	1	2	3	4	5	6	7	8	9	10	Final
Ontario (Potter)	3	1	3	4	0	1	X	X	X	X	12
Northern Ontario (Johnston)	0	0	0	0	2	0	X	X	X	X	2

Sheet D	1	2	3	4	5	6	7	8	9	10	Final
Quebec (Lemieux)	1	0	1	0	0	1	0	1	1	1	6
Newfoundland and Labrador (Rockwell)	0	0	0	2	0	0	1	0	0	0	3

Sheet E	1	2	3	4	5	6	7	8	9	10	Final
Alberta (Handfield)	0	1	1	0	2	1	0	1	0	1	7
Manitoba (Van Daele)	1	0	0	1	0	0	1	0	2	0	5

Sheet F	1	2	3	4	5	6	7	8	9	10	Final
New Brunswick (Dickeson)	0	1	0	1	0	0	2	2	0	X	6
Prince Edward Island (Currie)	0	0	2	0	1	0	0	0	1	X	4

==== Draw 14 ====
Sheet A	1	2	3	4	5	6	7	8	9	10	Final
Prince Edward Island (Currie)	2	0	0	2	0	1	0	4	X	X	9
Quebec (Lemieux)	0	0	1	0	1	0	1	0	X	X	3

Sheet B	1	2	3	4	5	6	7	8	9	10	Final
Manitoba (Van Daele)	1	0	0	2	0	0	3	0	0	2	8
New Brunswick (Dickeson)	0	0	0	0	2	1	0	1	2	0	6

Sheet C	1	2	3	4	5	6	7	8	9	10	Final
Saskatchewan (Frisk)	1	1	0	0	0	0	X	X	X	X	2
Nova Scotia (Bartlett)	0	0	2	3	3	1	X	X	X	X	9

Sheet D	1	2	3	4	5	6	7	8	9	10	11	Final
Northern Ontario (Johnston)	1	0	1	0	1	0	2	0	2	1	1	9
Alberta (Handfield)	0	4	0	1	0	2	0	1	0	0	0	8

Sheet E	1	2	3	4	5	6	7	8	9	10	Final
Newfoundland and Labrador (Rockwell)	0	1	0	1	0	1	0	X	X	X	3
British Columbia (Smiley)	2	0	3	0	2	0	3	X	X	X	10

Sheet F	1	2	3	4	5	6	7	8	9	10	Final
Northwest Territories/Yukon (Penkala)	0	0	2	1	0	1	0	X	X	X	4
Ontario (Potter)	3	3	0	0	2	0	2	X	X	X	10

==== Draw 16 ====
Sheet A	1	2	3	4	5	6	7	8	9	10	Final
New Brunswick (Dickeson)	0	1	3	1	0	0	0	4	X	X	9
Northwest Territories/Yukon (Penkala)	1	0	0	0	0	1	1	0	X	X	3

Sheet B	1	2	3	4	5	6	7	8	9	10	Final
Alberta (Handfield)	0	0	1	1	0	0	1	0	1	3	7
Saskatchewan (Frisk)	0	1	0	0	0	1	0	2	0	0	4

Sheet C	1	2	3	4	5	6	7	8	9	10	Final
Ontario (Potter)	2	1	0	0	1	1	4	X	X	X	9
Newfoundland and Labrador (Rockwell)	0	0	1	0	0	0	0	X	X	X	1

Sheet D	1	2	3	4	5	6	7	8	9	10	Final
Quebec (Lemieux)	2	0	1	0	0	0	X	X	X	X	3
Northern Ontario (Johnston)	0	3	0	2	2	5	X	X	X	X	12

Sheet E	1	2	3	4	5	6	7	8	9	10	Final
Nova Scotia (Bartlett)	1	0	0	1	3	0	3	0	2	X	10
Prince Edward Island (Currie)	0	0	2	0	0	2	0	2	0	X	6

Sheet F	1	2	3	4	5	6	7	8	9	10	Final
British Columbia (Smiley)	1	0	3	2	1	1	0	1	X	X	9
Manitoba (Van Daele)	0	1	0	0	0	0	1	0	X	X	2

==== Draw 18 ====
Sheet A	1	2	3	4	5	6	7	8	9	10	Final
Ontario (Potter)	2	0	2	0	1	2	0	2	X	X	9
Manitoba (Van Daele)	0	1	0	1	0	0	1	0	X	X	3

Sheet B	1	2	3	4	5	6	7	8	9	10	Final
Nova Scotia (Bartlett)	1	0	2	0	0	1	0	0	2	2	8
Newfoundland and Labrador (Rockwell)	0	2	0	0	0	0	2	2	0	0	6

Sheet C	1	2	3	4	5	6	7	8	9	10	Final
Alberta (Handfield)	0	1	0	1	0	0	2	1	0	0	5
Prince Edward Island (Currie)	0	0	2	0	1	0	0	0	0	1	4

Sheet D	1	2	3	4	5	6	7	8	9	10	Final
British Columbia (Smiley)	2	0	4	2	0	6	X	X	X	X	14
Northwest Territories/Yukon (Penkala)	0	1	0	0	1	0	X	X	X	X	2

Sheet E	1	2	3	4	5	6	7	8	9	10	11	Final
New Brunswick (Dickeson)	2	0	3	0	0	1	0	2	0	2	2	12
Northern Ontario (Johnston)	0	2	0	4	1	0	2	0	1	0	0	10

Sheet F	1	2	3	4	5	6	7	8	9	10	Final
Quebec (Lemieux)	1	0	0	2	0	1	2	1	1	0	8
Saskatchewan (Frisk)	0	1	2	0	3	0	0	0	0	3	9

==== Draw 20 ====
Sheet A	1	2	3	4	5	6	7	8	9	10	Final
Northern Ontario (Johnston)	0	1	0	0	1	0	2	0	0	1	5
British Columbia (Smiley)	1	0	0	1	0	4	0	0	1	0	7

Sheet B	1	2	3	4	5	6	7	8	9	10	Final
Prince Edward Island (Currie)	0	0	0	1	1	0	0	0	0	X	2
Ontario (Potter)	2	1	0	0	0	1	1	1	2	X	8

Sheet C	1	2	3	4	5	6	7	8	9	10	Final
Saskatchewan (Frisk)	3	0	0	3	0	1	1	0	0	X	8
New Brunswick (Dickeson)	0	2	0	0	1	0	0	1	1	X	5

Sheet D	1	2	3	4	5	6	7	8	9	10	Final
Manitoba (Van Daele)	0	0	2	0	2	0	1	0	2	0	7
Nova Scotia (Bartlett)	1	1	0	1	0	1	0	1	0	1	6

Sheet E	1	2	3	4	5	6	7	8	9	10	Final
Northwest Territories/Yukon (Penkala)	1	0	2	0	0	0	0	1	0	0	4
Quebec (Lemieux)	0	1	0	0	1	2	1	0	1	2	8

Sheet F	1	2	3	4	5	6	7	8	9	10	Final
Newfoundland and Labrador (Rockwell)	3	0	1	1	1	0	0	1	0	X	7
Alberta (Handfield)	0	1	0	0	0	1	1	0	1	X	4

==== Draw 22 ====
Sheet A	1	2	3	4	5	6	7	8	9	10	Final
Saskatchewan (Frisk)	0	1	0	0	0	0	2	0	0	X	3
Ontario (Potter)	1	0	1	2	1	1	0	1	2	X	9

Sheet B	1	2	3	4	5	6	7	8	9	10	Final
Newfoundland and Labrador (Rockwell)	2	1	0	1	0	0	2	1	1	0	8
New Brunswick (Dickeson)	0	0	3	0	4	0	0	0	0	2	9

Sheet C	1	2	3	4	5	6	7	8	9	10	Final
Northwest Territories/Yukon (Penkala)	1	0	0	3	1	0	2	1	0	X	8
Alberta (Handfield)	0	2	1	0	0	1	0	0	1	X	5

Sheet D	1	2	3	4	5	6	7	8	9	10	Final
Prince Edward Island (Currie)	0	0	3	0	2	1	2	0	0	0	8
British Columbia (Smiley)	3	1	0	3	0	0	0	1	1	1	10

Sheet E	1	2	3	4	5	6	7	8	9	10	Final
Manitoba (Van Daele)	2	1	0	2	0	2	0	0	4	X	11
Quebec (Lemieux)	0	0	2	0	3	0	1	1	0	X	7

Sheet F	1	2	3	4	5	6	7	8	9	10	Final
Northern Ontario (Johnston)	1	1	0	2	0	0	1	1	0	1	7
Nova Scotia (Bartlett)	0	0	1	0	1	1	0	0	2	0	5

=== Playoffs ===
Tiebreaker #1
Northern Ontario	15
Nova Scotia	7

Tiebreaker #2
Northern Ontario	4
New Brunswick	6

Semifinal
Ontario	8
New Brunswick	4

Final
Ontario	7
British Columbia	6

==== Tiebreaker #1 ====
Sheet C	1	2	3	4	5	6	7	8	9	10	Final
Northern Ontario (Johnston)	0	3	0	3	0	5	0	4	X	X	15
Nova Scotia (Bartlett)	1	0	1	0	3	0	2	0	X	X	7

Player percentages
Northern Ontario		Nova Scotia	
Maymar Gemmell	91%	Marjorie MacKay	83%
Jan Towns	84%	Karen Hennigar	73%
Anne Harris	81%	Penny LaRocque	66%
Brenda Johnston	86%	Sue-Anne Bartlett	69%
Total	85%	Total	73%

==== Tiebreaker #2 ====
Sheet A	1	2	3	4	5	6	7	8	9	10	Final
Northern Ontario (Johnston)	0	0	0	2	0	0	0	1	1	0	4
New Brunswick (Dickeson)	0	1	2	0	1	0	2	0	0	0	6

Player percentages
Northern Ontario		New Brunswick	
Maymar Gemmell	78%	Rita Vandevyvere	61%
Jan Towns	64%	Shawn Stubbert	80%
Anne Harris	68%	Debbi Dickeson	75%
Brenda Johnston	74%	Sharon Levesque	61%
Total	71%	Total	70%

==== Semifinal ====
Sheet B	1	2	3	4	5	6	7	8	9	10	Final
Ontario (Potter)	0	1	1	0	2	0	1	1	1	1	8
New Brunswick (Dickeson)	0	0	0	2	0	2	0	0	0	0	4

Player percentages
Ontario		New Brunswick	
Bonnie Morris	81%	Rita Vandevyvere	85%
Janelle Sadler	83%	Shawn Stubbert	59%
Muriel Potter	76%	Debbi Dickeson	60%
Joyce Potter	58%	Sharon Levesque	49%
Total	75%	Total	63%

==== Final ====
Sheet D	1	2	3	4	5	6	7	8	9	10	11	Final
Ontario (Potter)	0	0	2	0	0	1	2	1	0	0	1	7
British Columbia (Smiley)	0	1	0	1	3	0	0	0	0	1	0	6

Player percentages
Ontario		British Columbia	
Bonnie Morris	80%	Linda Brunn	76%
Janelle Sadler	74%	Rita Imai	84%
Muriel Potter	66%	Kerri Miller	69%
Joyce Potter	82%	Kathy Smiley	49%
Total	75%	Total	70%
