= 1970 Macdonald Brier =

- Host city: Winnipeg, Manitoba
- Arena: Winnipeg Arena
- Dates: March 2–6
- Attendance: 60,255
- Winner: Manitoba
- Curling club: Granite CC, Winnipeg
- Skip: Don Duguid
- Third: Rod Hunter
- Second: Jim Pettapiece
- Lead: Bryan Wood

The 1970 Macdonald Brier, Canada's national men's curling championship was held March 2–6 at the Winnipeg Arena in Winnipeg, Manitoba.

The hometown Don Duguid rink out of Winnipeg's Granite Club won the event in the last draw, when they beat Saskatchewan's Bob Pickering rink in front of 9,287 fans at the Winnipeg Arena, which was "filled to capacity". This gave the team the best round robin record, preventing a playoff against the next best team, Alberta, which had one more loss. With the championship, the Duguid team would go on to represent Canada at the 1970 Air Canada Silver Broom, the World Curling Championships, which they won.

Duguid's only loss came against Team British Columbia, skipped by 1964 Brier champion Lyall Dagg, who would go on to finish in third place. Manitoba's first round match against Alberta, skipped by 1961 Brier and World Champion Hec Gervais, proved to be the deciding game. The ice in that game had been described as particularly bad, having "almost turned to water", requiring more force to throw rocks, and making hits nearly impossible. Manitoba won their match against Alberta 10-9, after Gervais missed his last throw.

Prior to the season, Duguid's experience as a skip was limited, though he had won the 1965 Brier as a third. For the 1970 season, Duguid reluctantly joined forces with teammates Rod Hunter, Jim Pettapiece and Bryan Wood, replacing Hunter's brother, and found immediate success.

== Teams ==
The teams are listed as follows:

Alberta	British Columbia	Manitoba
Granite CC, Edmonton Skip: Hec Gervais; Third: Bill Mitchell; Second: Wayne Saboe; Lead: Bill Tainsh	Vancouver CC, Vancouver Skip: Lyall Dagg; Third: Barry Naimark; Second: Leo Hebert; Lead: Terry Paulson	Granite CC, Winnipeg Skip: Don Duguid; Third: Rod Hunter; Second: Jim Pettapiece; Lead: Bryan Wood
New Brunswick	Newfoundland	Northern Ontario
Moncton CA, Moncton Skip: Harold Mabey Jr. Third: Ed Steeves; Second: Hal Keith; Lead: Grant MacMellon	St. John's CC, St. John's Skip: Les Bowering; Third: Frank Stent; Second: Dan Herder; Lead: Roger Mabey	Fort William CC, Thunder Bay Skip: Tom Tod; Third: James Carson; Second: J. Carl Whitfield; Lead: Bill Hallinan
Nova Scotia	Ontario	Prince Edward Island
Mayflower CC, Halifax Skip: Ron Franklin; Third: Peter Corkum; Second: Stu Cameron; Lead: Howard Oxner	The Terrace Club, Toronto Skip: Paul Savage; Third: Thomas Cushing; Second: Gerry Downer; Lead: David Phillips	Charlottetown CC, Charlottetown Skip: Art Burke; Third: George Dillon; Second: George Saunders; Lead: Lorne Burke
Quebec	Saskatchewan
Heather CC, Hampstead Skip: Bill Kent; Third: John Hammond; Second: Don Aitken; Lead: Art Lobel	Avonlea CC, Avonlea Skip: Bob Pickering; Third: Garnet Campbell; Second: John Keys; Lead: Gary Ford

== Map of teams ==
Provincial Winners

== Round Robin standings ==
Key
Brier champion

Province	Skip	W	L	PF	PA
Manitoba	Don Duguid	9	1	105	68
Alberta	Hec Gervais	8	2	119	86
British Columbia	Lyall Dagg	7	3	97	84
Saskatchewan	Bob Pickering	6	4	97	77
Northern Ontario	Tom Tod	6	4	88	85
Newfoundland	Les Bowering	4	6	97	101
New Brunswick	Harold Mabey Jr.	4	6	81	87
Ontario	Paul Savage	4	6	81	103
Prince Edward Island	Art Burke	3	7	80	109
Nova Scotia	Ron Franklin	3	7	88	104
Quebec	Bill Kent	1	9	80	109

== Round Robin results ==
=== Draw 1 ===
Monday, March 2

Team	1	2	3	4	5	6	7	8	9	10	11	12	Final
Saskatchewan (Pickering)	0	1	0	2	2	2	0	0	3	0	2	0	12
Northern Ontario (Tod)	2	0	3	0	0	0	1	0	0	4	0	1	11

Team	1	2	3	4	5	6	7	8	9	10	11	12	Final
Ontario (Savage)	0	2	0	1	0	0	2	0	0	2	1	2	10
British Columbia (Dagg)	1	0	1	0	1	2	0	1	1	0	0	0	7

Team	1	2	3	4	5	6	7	8	9	10	11	12	Final
Manitoba (Duguid)	1	0	2	0	3	1	0	1	0	0	1	1	10
Alberta (Gervais)	0	2	0	1	0	0	1	0	2	3	0	0	9

Team	1	2	3	4	5	6	7	8	9	10	11	12	Final
New Brunswick (Mabey Jr.)	2	0	0	0	0	0	3	0	3	0	0	1	9
Quebec (Kent)	0	1	1	0	0	2	0	2	0	1	1	0	8

Team	1	2	3	4	5	6	7	8	9	10	11	12	Final
Prince Edward Island (Burke)	2	0	0	2	3	0	2	1	0	0	3	0	13
Nova Scotia (Franklin)	0	1	1	0	2	2	0	0	0	1	0	1	8

=== Draw 2 ===
Monday, March 2

Team	1	2	3	4	5	6	7	8	9	10	11	12	Final
Ontario (Savage)	0	0	1	1	0	0	3	0	0	2	0	0	7
New Brunswick (Mabey Jr.)	0	2	0	0	1	1	0	1	4	0	1	1	11

Team	1	2	3	4	5	6	7	8	9	10	11	12	Final
Alberta (Gervais)	0	0	1	2	0	1	2	0	1	0	1	1	9
Northern Ontario (Tod)	3	1	0	0	2	0	0	1	0	1	0	0	8

Team	1	2	3	4	5	6	7	8	9	10	11	12	Final
Saskatchewan (Pickering)	1	1	1	0	0	2	0	1	0	0	2	0	8
Prince Edward Island (Burke)	0	0	0	2	0	0	0	0	1	1	0	3	7

Team	1	2	3	4	5	6	7	8	9	10	11	12	Final
Newfoundland (Bowering)	3	0	0	2	0	3	0	1	0	1	0	2	12
Nova Scotia (Franklin)	0	3	1	0	3	0	1	0	2	0	4	0	14

Team	1	2	3	4	5	6	7	8	9	10	11	12	Final
Manitoba (Duguid)	0	2	0	2	0	3	2	0	2	2	3	0	16
Quebec (Kent)	0	0	1	0	3	0	0	1	0	0	0	1	6

=== Draw 3 ===
Tuesday, March 3

Team	1	2	3	4	5	6	7	8	9	10	11	12	Final
Newfoundland (Bowering)	1	0	1	0	1	0	0	1	0	3	0	0	7
Saskatchewan (Pickering)	0	2	0	1	0	1	2	0	4	0	3	1	14

Team	1	2	3	4	5	6	7	8	9	10	11	12	Final
Manitoba (Duguid)	1	1	1	0	0	2	0	0	3	1	0	0	9
Ontario (Savage)	0	0	0	1	1	0	1	1	0	0	1	2	7

Team	1	2	3	4	5	6	7	8	9	10	11	12	Final
Northern Ontario (Tod)	0	3	0	2	1	0	1	0	2	0	1	1	11
Quebec (Kent)	0	0	1	0	0	2	0	1	0	2	0	0	6

Team	1	2	3	4	5	6	7	8	9	10	11	12	Final
British Columbia (Dagg)	1	0	4	0	1	0	2	1	0	1	0	1	11
New Brunswick (Mabey Jr.)	0	0	0	1	0	1	0	0	1	0	3	0	6

Team	1	2	3	4	5	6	7	8	9	10	11	12	Final
Alberta (Gervais)	4	3	0	0	1	0	4	0	3	1	0	2	18
Prince Edward Island (Burke)	0	0	1	1	0	1	0	1	0	0	1	0	5

=== Draw 4 ===
Tuesday, March 3

Team	1	2	3	4	5	6	7	8	9	10	11	12	13	Final
British Columbia (Dagg)	1	1	0	0	0	1	0	1	2	0	1	1	1	9
Manitoba (Duguid)	0	0	2	2	1	0	1	0	0	2	0	0	0	8

Team	1	2	3	4	5	6	7	8	9	10	11	12	13	Final
Nova Scotia (Franklin)	1	0	2	1	0	0	1	0	2	0	1	0	1	9
Saskatchewan (Pickering)	0	2	0	0	1	1	0	1	0	1	0	2	0	8

Team	1	2	3	4	5	6	7	8	9	10	11	12	Final
Alberta (Gervais)	1	1	0	2	0	0	2	0	2	0	3	0	11
Newfoundland (Bowering)	0	0	2	0	2	1	0	1	0	1	0	2	9

Team	1	2	3	4	5	6	7	8	9	10	11	12	13	Final
Quebec (Kent)	0	0	2	0	1	1	2	0	2	0	0	1	0	9
Prince Edward Island (Burke)	0	2	0	3	0	0	0	1	0	1	2	0	1	10

Team	1	2	3	4	5	6	7	8	9	10	11	12	Final
Northern Ontario (Tod)	0	4	0	1	1	1	0	0	1	0	2	1	11
Ontario (Savage)	1	0	1	0	0	0	1	2	0	1	0	0	6

=== Draw 5 ===
Wednesday, March 4

Team	1	2	3	4	5	6	7	8	9	10	11	12	Final
Prince Edward Island (Burke)	1	0	0	1	1	0	0	2	0	0	2	1	8
Ontario (Savage)	0	3	2	0	0	3	1	0	2	1	0	0	12

Team	1	2	3	4	5	6	7	8	9	10	11	12	Final
Quebec (Kent)	1	0	0	1	0	1	1	3	0	1	0	3	11
Newfoundland (Bowering)	0	1	1	0	1	0	0	0	2	0	2	0	7

Team	1	2	3	4	5	6	7	8	9	10	11	12	Final
Northern Ontario (Tod)	0	1	0	0	3	0	0	1	0	1	0	0	6
British Columbia (Dagg)	0	0	1	0	0	3	1	0	1	0	0	3	9

Team	1	2	3	4	5	6	7	8	9	10	11	12	Final
New Brunswick (Mabey Jr.)	1	0	0	0	0	1	0	1	0	0	1	0	4
Manitoba (Duguid)	0	1	0	1	1	0	2	0	1	0	0	2	8

Team	1	2	3	4	5	6	7	8	9	10	11	12	Final
Nova Scotia (Franklin)	0	1	0	1	0	2	0	3	0	0	1	0	8
Alberta (Gervais)	0	0	2	0	3	0	4	0	0	1	0	3	13

=== Draw 6 ===
Wednesday, March 4

Team	1	2	3	4	5	6	7	8	9	10	11	12	13	Final
New Brunswick (Mabey Jr.)	0	0	0	0	2	1	0	0	0	2	1	1	0	7
Northern Ontario (Tod)	2	1	1	1	0	0	0	1	1	0	0	0	1	8

Team	1	2	3	4	5	6	7	8	9	10	11	12	Final
Ontario (Savage)	0	0	0	1	0	1	0	1	0	2	0	1	6
Newfoundland (Bowering)	3	3	1	0	2	0	1	0	1	0	3	0	14

Team	1	2	3	4	5	6	7	8	9	10	11	12	Final
Quebec (Kent)	2	0	1	0	1	0	1	0	0	2	0	0	7
Nova Scotia (Franklin)	0	1	0	1	0	1	0	3	2	0	1	2	11

Team	1	2	3	4	5	6	7	8	9	10	11	12	Final
Saskatchewan (Pickering)	2	1	0	0	0	1	0	2	2	0	0	1	9
Alberta (Gervais)	0	0	2	2	0	0	2	0	0	2	0	0	8

Team	1	2	3	4	5	6	7	8	9	10	11	12	Final
Prince Edward Island (Burke)	0	1	1	1	0	0	1	1	1	1	0	1	8
British Columbia (Dagg)	2	0	0	0	2	5	0	0	0	0	1	0	10

=== Draw 7 ===
Thursday, March 5

Team	1	2	3	4	5	6	7	8	9	10	11	12	Final
Manitoba (Duguid)	2	1	0	0	2	0	0	1	2	2	0	0	10
Northern Ontario (Tod)	0	0	2	1	0	1	0	0	0	0	1	2	7

Team	1	2	3	4	5	6	7	8	9	10	11	12	Final
Saskatchewan (Pickering)	0	1	0	2	0	2	0	3	0	2	2	0	12
Quebec (Kent)	1	0	1	0	2	0	0	2	0	0	0	1	7

Team	1	2	3	4	5	6	7	8	9	10	11	12	Final
Newfoundland (Bowering)	0	1	0	2	0	1	0	2	1	2	0	2	11
British Columbia (Dagg)	2	0	2	0	1	0	2	0	0	0	2	0	9

Team	1	2	3	4	5	6	7	8	9	10	11	12	Final
Prince Edward Island (Burke)	0	0	2	0	1	1	1	0	2	1	0	1	9
New Brunswick (Mabey Jr.)	3	1	0	1	0	0	0	1	0	0	2	0	8

Team	1	2	3	4	5	6	7	8	9	10	11	12	Final
Ontario (Savage)	0	0	0	0	2	0	1	2	1	0	1	1	8
Nova Scotia (Franklin)	2	1	0	1	0	0	0	0	0	1	0	0	5

=== Draw 8 ===
Thursday, March 5

Team	1	2	3	4	5	6	7	8	9	10	11	12	Final
Alberta (Gervais)	0	0	4	0	3	0	2	1	0	2	0	0	12
Quebec (Kent)	0	2	0	2	0	1	0	0	2	0	1	1	9

Team	1	2	3	4	5	6	7	8	9	10	11	12	Final
Ontario (Savage)	0	2	0	1	0	2	1	0	0	0	0	0	6
Saskatchewan (Pickering)	1	0	1	0	2	0	0	4	1	5	1	0	15

Team	1	2	3	4	5	6	7	8	9	10	11	12	Final
Manitoba (Duguid)	0	1	0	2	0	4	0	0	2	0	2	3	14
Prince Edward Island (Burke)	0	0	2	0	1	0	1	0	0	1	0	0	5

Team	1	2	3	4	5	6	7	8	9	10	11	12	Final
British Columbia (Dagg)	2	0	2	0	1	0	2	0	1	3	0	2	13
Nova Scotia (Franklin)	0	1	0	1	0	1	0	3	0	0	1	0	7

Team	1	2	3	4	5	6	7	8	9	10	11	12	Final
Newfoundland (Bowering)	1	0	1	1	0	1	0	2	4	0	0	1	11
New Brunswick (Mabey Jr.)	0	3	0	0	1	0	0	0	0	2	1	0	7

=== Draw 9 ===
Thursday, March 5

Team	1	2	3	4	5	6	7	8	9	10	11	12	Final
Alberta (Gervais)	0	0	0	3	1	4	2	1	1	0	1	1	14
Ontario (Savage)	5	1	1	0	0	0	0	0	0	1	0	0	8

Team	1	2	3	4	5	6	7	8	9	10	11	12	Final
Nova Scotia (Franklin)	0	0	1	1	0	3	0	1	0	1	0	1	8
New Brunswick (Mabey Jr.)	2	3	0	0	1	0	1	0	4	0	3	0	14

Team	1	2	3	4	5	6	7	8	9	10	11	12	Final
Newfoundland (Bowering)	1	0	0	2	0	1	0	0	1	1	0	2	8
Manitoba (Duguid)	0	2	1	0	3	0	4	1	0	0	0	0	11

Team	1	2	3	4	5	6	7	8	9	10	11	12	Final
Northern Ontario (Tod)	1	1	2	3	0	1	0	2	0	0	2	0	12
Prince Edward Island (Burke)	0	0	0	0	1	0	1	0	2	1	0	1	6

Team	1	2	3	4	5	6	7	8	9	10	11	12	Final
British Columbia (Dagg)	1	0	0	1	0	1	0	2	0	1	1	1	8
Saskatchewan (Pickering)	0	2	2	0	1	0	1	0	1	0	0	0	7

=== Draw 10 ===
Friday, March 6

Team	1	2	3	4	5	6	7	8	9	10	11	12	Final
Nova Scotia (Franklin)	0	1	0	0	2	0	1	0	0	1	0	1	6
Manitoba (Duguid)	0	0	0	1	0	2	0	3	3	0	2	0	11

Team	1	2	3	4	5	6	7	8	9	10	11	12	Final
Northern Ontario (Tod)	2	0	0	2	0	1	0	2	0	2	0	0	9
Newfoundland (Bowering)	0	1	1	0	1	0	1	0	1	0	2	1	8

Team	1	2	3	4	5	6	7	8	9	10	11	12	Final
Quebec (Kent)	1	0	0	0	3	0	2	0	2	0	0	1	9
Ontario (Savage)	0	1	2	1	0	2	0	2	0	1	2	0	11

Team	1	2	3	4	5	6	7	8	9	10	11	12	Final
British Columbia (Dagg)	2	0	2	0	0	1	0	4	0	1	0	1	11
Alberta (Gervais)	0	1	0	2	5	0	1	0	1	0	3	0	13

Team	1	2	3	4	5	6	7	8	9	10	11	12	13	Final
New Brunswick (Mabey Jr.)	0	0	0	1	0	1	0	1	0	2	0	0	1	6
Saskatchewan (Pickering)	0	1	0	0	1	0	0	0	1	0	0	2	0	5

=== Draw 11 ===
Friday, March 6

Team	1	2	3	4	5	6	7	8	9	10	11	12	Final
Northern Ontario (Tod)	0	0	0	2	0	0	1	0	0	2	0	0	5
Nova Scotia (Franklin)	1	1	2	0	1	3	0	1	1	0	1	1	12

Team	1	2	3	4	5	6	7	8	9	10	11	12	Final
New Brunswick (Mabey Jr.)	1	0	0	1	0	0	2	0	2	0	2	1	9
Alberta (Gervais)	0	3	0	0	1	5	0	1	0	2	0	0	12

Team	1	2	3	4	5	6	7	8	9	10	11	12	Final
Quebec (Kent)	2	2	0	1	0	1	0	0	1	0	1	0	8
British Columbia (Dagg)	0	0	3	0	1	0	1	1	0	3	0	1	10

Team	1	2	3	4	5	6	7	8	9	10	11	12	Final
Prince Edward Island (Burke)	0	1	0	0	2	0	2	0	1	0	0	3	9
Newfoundland (Bowering)	2	0	1	1	0	2	0	2	0	1	1	0	10

Team	1	2	3	4	5	6	7	8	9	10	11	12	Final
Saskatchewan (Pickering)	0	1	0	2	1	0	1	0	1	0	1	0	7
Manitoba (Duguid)	2	0	1	0	0	1	0	1	0	2	0	1	8

== Awards ==
=== All-Star Team ===
The media selected the following curlers as All-Stars.

Don Duguid became the first curler to make the All-Star team in more than one position as Duguid was previously selected to the All-Star team in 1965 as a third.

Position	Name	Team
Skip	Don Duguid (2)	Manitoba
Third	Jim Carson	Northern Ontario
Second	Leo Hebert	British Columbia
Lead	Gary Ford	Saskatchewan

=== Ross G.L. Harstone Award ===
The Ross Harstone Award was presented to the player chosen by their fellow peers as the curler who best represented Harstone's high ideals of good sportsmanship, observance of the rules, exemplary conduct and curling ability.

Name	Team	Position
Ed Steeves	New Brunswick	Third
