= 1976 Macdonald Brier =

- Host city: Regina, Saskatchewan
- Arena: Regina Exhibition Stadium
- Dates: March 7–13
- Attendance: 61,110
- Winner: Newfoundland
- Curling club: St. John's CC, St. John's
- Skip: Jack MacDuff
- Third: Toby McDonald
- Second: Doug Hudson
- Lead: Ken Templeton
- Coach: Sam Richardson (unofficial)

The 1976 Macdonald Brier, the Canadian men's national curling championship was held from March 7 to 13, 1976 at Regina Exhibition Stadium in Regina, Saskatchewan. The total attendance for the week was 61,110. This was the final Brier in which regulation games were 12 ends in length.

Team Newfoundland, who was skipped by Jack MacDuff captured the Brier tankard as they finished round robin play with a 9–2 record. This was Newfoundland's first ever Brier title. MacDuff's rink were considered heavy underdogs in the event as their odds of winning the Brier had been put at 1,000 to 1, making the victory extraordinary.

The MacDuff rink would go onto represent Canada in the 1976 Air Canada Silver Broom, the men's world curling championships in Duluth, Minnesota. They could not replicate the Brier success however, as they finished ninth out of ten teams with a 2–7 record, which at the time was the worst finish by a Canadian team in the world championships.

British Columbia's 6–5 victory over Alberta in Draw 11 was the fifth double extra end game in Brier history and the first since 1973. This game was one of eleven games in the tournament which went to an extra end, setting a record for most extra end games in one Brier. This would end up being a Macdonald era (until 1979) record and wouldn't be broken until 1981.

This Brier also set a record for most blank ends in a single Brier as 199 ends were blanked. To date, this is the most blank ends in a single Brier. There were also two games (BC vs. Quebec in Draw 5 and Newfoundland vs. Saskatchewan in Draw 12) which tied a Brier record set in 1974 for most blank ends in one game with seven. This record would not be broken until 1990.

== Teams ==
The teams were as follows:

Alberta	British Columbia	Manitoba
Calgary CC, Calgary Skip: Wayne Sokolosky; Third: Frank Morissette; Second: John Cottam; Lead: Shayne Wylie	Burnaby WC, Burnaby Skip: Bernie Sparkes; Third: Bert Gretzinger; Second: Al Cook; Lead: Keiven Bauer	Heather CC, Winnipeg Skip: Clare DeBlonde; Third: Garry DeBlonde; Second: Don Finkbeiner; Lead: Doug Finkbeiner
New Brunswick	Newfoundland	Northern Ontario
Capital WC, Fredericton Skip: Dave Sullivan; Third: Mike Flannery; Second:Tom Rubec; Lead: Greg Gilks	St. John's CC, St. John's Skip: Jack MacDuff; Third: Toby McDonald; Second: Doug Hudson; Lead: Ken Templeton	Fort William CC, Thunder Bay Skip: Rick Lang; Third: Bob Nicol; Second: Al Fiskar Jr. Lead: Warren Butters
Nova Scotia	Ontario	Prince Edward Island
Mayflower CC, Halifax Skip: Alf Romain; Third: Doug Arnold; Second: Stu Cameron; Lead: Guy LaRocque	Dixie CC, Mississauga Skip: Joe Gurowka; Third: Bob Charlebois; Second: Ray Lilly; Lead: Jim McGrath	Charlottetown CC, Charlottetown Skip: Ken MacDonald; Third: Keith MacEachern; Second: Peter McDonald; Lead: Al Ledgerwood
Quebec	Saskatchewan	Northwest Territories/Yukon
St. Laurent CC, Mount Royal Skip: Jim Ursel; Third: Art Lobel; Second: Don Aitken; Lead: Brian Ross	Moose Jaw CC, Moose Jaw Skip: Roger Anholt; Third: Gord Stewart; Second: Bob Hicks; Lead: Bill Wilson	Fort Smith CC, Fort Smith Skip: Howie Brazeau; Third: Jim Schaefer; Second: Charles Schaefer; Lead: Paul Kaeser Jr.

== Map of teams ==
Provincial Winners

== Round Robin standings ==
Final Round Robin standings

Key
Brier champion

Province	Skip	W	L	PF	PA	S%
Newfoundland	Jack MacDuff	9	2	81	61	72%
Manitoba	Clare DeBlonde	8	3	69	60	79%
British Columbia	Bernie Sparkes	7	4	74	58	80%
Quebec	Jim Ursel	7	4	66	53	79%
New Brunswick	Dave Sullivan	7	4	63	56	73%
Alberta	Wayne Sokolosky	6	5	73	65	75%
Northern Ontario	Rick Lang	5	6	76	75	74%
Northwest Territories/Yukon	Howard Brazeau	5	6	57	71	72%
Nova Scotia	Alf Romain	4	7	59	81	71%
Saskatchewan	Roger Anholt	3	8	56	68	75%
Ontario	Joe Gurowka	3	8	66	82	78%
Prince Edward Island	Ken MacDonald	2	9	62	72	72%

== Round Robin results ==
All draw times are listed in Central Standard Time (UTC-06:00).

=== Draw 1 ===
Sunday, March 7, 1:30 pm

Team	1	2	3	4	5	6	7	8	9	10	11	12	13	Final
Prince Edward Island (MacDonald)	1	0	1	0	2	0	1	0	0	1	0	1	0	7
Newfoundland (MacDuff)	0	2	0	2	0	1	0	0	1	0	1	0	1	8

Team	1	2	3	4	5	6	7	8	9	10	11	12	Final
Northwest Territories/Yukon (Brazeau)	1	0	0	0	4	1	0	3	0	2	X	X	11
Nova Scotia (Romain)	0	1	0	0	0	0	1	0	2	0	X	X	4

Team	1	2	3	4	5	6	7	8	9	10	11	12	Final
Northern Ontario (Lang)	0	0	0	3	3	0	2	1	0	0	0	0	9
British Columbia (Sparkes)	0	0	0	0	0	1	0	0	3	1	1	2	8

Team	1	2	3	4	5	6	7	8	9	10	11	12	Final
New Brunswick (Sullivan)	0	0	0	0	0	1	0	1	0	1	0	X	3
Alberta (Sokolosky)	0	1	0	0	1	0	3	0	1	0	2	X	8

Team	1	2	3	4	5	6	7	8	9	10	11	12	Final
Quebec (Ursel)	0	0	1	0	1	0	0	0	0	0	1	2	5
Manitoba (DeBlonde)	0	0	0	1	0	0	0	0	1	1	0	0	3

=== Draw 2 ===
Sunday, March 7, 7:30 pm

Team	1	2	3	4	5	6	7	8	9	10	11	12	Final
Northwest Territories/Yukon (Brazeau)	0	0	0	1	0	1	0	0	0	1	X	X	3
Alberta (Sokolosky)	2	0	1	0	2	0	1	3	1	0	X	X	10

Team	1	2	3	4	5	6	7	8	9	10	11	12	Final
Northern Ontario (Lang)	0	0	1	1	0	2	0	0	2	0	0	1	7
Prince Edward Island (MacDonald)	3	2	0	0	2	0	0	1	0	0	1	0	9

Team	1	2	3	4	5	6	7	8	9	10	11	12	13	Final
Ontario (Gurowka)	0	0	0	1	2	1	0	1	0	0	0	1	0	6
Saskatchewan (Anholt)	1	0	2	0	0	0	2	0	0	1	0	0	1	7

Team	1	2	3	4	5	6	7	8	9	10	11	12	Final
Newfoundland (MacDuff)	0	1	0	1	0	0	0	2	0	1	0	2	7
British Columbia (Sparkes)	0	0	1	0	1	0	1	0	1	0	2	0	6

Team	1	2	3	4	5	6	7	8	9	10	11	12	Final
Nova Scotia (Romain)	0	0	0	1	0	0	1	0	1	0	0	0	3
New Brunswick (Sullivan)	1	0	1	0	1	1	0	0	0	0	0	1	5

=== Draw 3 ===
Monday, March 8, 9:00 am

Team	1	2	3	4	5	6	7	8	9	10	11	12	Final
Saskatchewan (Anholt)	0	0	0	0	0	1	0	0	1	0	1	X	3
British Columbia (Sparkes)	0	0	1	2	0	0	0	3	0	2	0	X	8

Team	1	2	3	4	5	6	7	8	9	10	11	12	13	Final
Northwest Territories/Yukon (Brazeau)	1	0	1	0	0	0	1	0	0	0	0	1	1	5
Quebec (Ursel)	0	2	0	2	0	0	0	0	0	0	0	0	0	4

Team	1	2	3	4	5	6	7	8	9	10	11	12	13	Final
Alberta (Sokolosky)	0	0	0	1	1	0	0	2	0	0	0	1	1	6
Manitoba (DeBlonde)	1	0	0	0	0	1	0	0	1	1	1	0	0	5

=== Draw 4 ===
Monday, March 8, 1:30 pm

Team	1	2	3	4	5	6	7	8	9	10	11	12	Final
Nova Scotia (Romain)	0	2	1	0	1	0	0	0	1	0	0	1	6
Northern Ontario (Lang)	0	0	0	2	0	0	0	1	0	2	0	0	5

Team	1	2	3	4	5	6	7	8	9	10	11	12	Final
New Brunswick (Sullivan)	1	1	0	0	1	0	1	0	3	0	1	X	8
Newfoundland (MacDuff)	0	0	1	0	0	2	0	0	0	2	0	X	5

Team	1	2	3	4	5	6	7	8	9	10	11	12	Final
Prince Edward Island (MacDonald)	0	1	1	0	0	0	0	2	0	0	1	0	5
Ontario (Gurowka)	0	0	0	0	0	0	2	0	0	1	0	3	6

=== Draw 5 ===
Monday, March 8, 7:30 pm

Team	1	2	3	4	5	6	7	8	9	10	11	12	13	Final
Quebec (Ursel)	1	0	0	0	0	0	0	0	0	1	0	1	0	3
British Columbia (Sparkes)	0	0	0	0	2	0	0	1	0	0	0	0	1	4

Team	1	2	3	4	5	6	7	8	9	10	11	12	13	Final
Ontario (Gurowka)	0	1	0	0	0	2	0	3	0	0	1	0	0	7
New Brunswick (Sullivan)	0	0	2	0	1	0	1	0	3	0	0	0	1	8

Team	1	2	3	4	5	6	7	8	9	10	11	12	Final
Manitoba (DeBlonde)	0	1	1	1	0	0	1	0	0	0	1	X	5
Prince Edward Island (MacDonald)	0	0	0	0	0	1	0	2	0	0	0	X	3

Team	1	2	3	4	5	6	7	8	9	10	11	12	Final
Saskatchewan (Anholt)	0	0	1	0	1	0	0	3	0	0	2	0	7
Nova Scotia (Romain)	1	2	0	1	0	0	2	0	0	1	0	2	9

Team	1	2	3	4	5	6	7	8	9	10	11	12	Final
Northern Ontario (Lang)	1	0	2	0	1	0	1	0	0	4	2	X	11
Newfoundland (MacDuff)	0	2	0	1	0	1	0	2	1	0	0	X	7

=== Draw 6 ===
Tuesday, March 9, 9:00 am

Team	1	2	3	4	5	6	7	8	9	10	11	12	Final
New Brunswick (Sullivan)	0	0	0	2	1	0	0	1	1	0	1	X	6
Saskatchewan (Anholt)	1	0	0	0	0	1	0	0	0	0	0	X	2

Team	1	2	3	4	5	6	7	8	9	10	11	12	Final
Newfoundland (MacDuff)	0	0	1	1	1	0	0	0	0	0	2	1	6
Quebec (Ursel)	1	1	0	0	0	0	0	0	1	1	0	0	4

Team	1	2	3	4	5	6	7	8	9	10	11	12	Final
British Columbia (Sparkes)	0	0	2	0	0	2	0	1	0	0	1	X	6
Manitoba (DeBlonde)	1	0	0	2	0	0	1	0	1	2	0	X	7

Team	1	2	3	4	5	6	7	8	9	10	11	12	Final
Ontario (Gurowka)	0	1	0	1	0	1	0	1	0	0	1	X	5
Northwest Territories/Yukon (Brazeau)	0	0	1	0	1	0	2	0	1	1	0	X	6

Team	1	2	3	4	5	6	7	8	9	10	11	12	Final
Nova Scotia (Romain)	0	2	0	1	0	1	0	1	1	0	1	X	7
Alberta (Sokolosky)	0	0	1	0	2	0	1	0	0	0	0	X	4

=== Draw 7 ===
Tuesday, March 9, 2:00 pm

Team	1	2	3	4	5	6	7	8	9	10	11	12	Final
Northern Ontario (Lang)	0	0	1	1	0	0	1	1	0	0	0	0	4
Manitoba (DeBlonde)	0	1	0	0	0	3	0	0	0	0	0	1	5

Team	1	2	3	4	5	6	7	8	9	10	11	12	Final
Saskatchewan (Anholt)	0	1	1	0	0	0	0	1	0	2	0	X	5
Alberta (Sokolosky)	2	0	0	1	0	1	4	0	0	0	1	X	9

Team	1	2	3	4	5	6	7	8	9	10	11	12	Final
Nova Scotia (Romain)	1	0	0	0	2	0	2	0	0	0	1	0	6
Ontario (Gurowka)	0	0	1	1	0	2	0	0	1	1	0	2	8

Team	1	2	3	4	5	6	7	8	9	10	11	12	Final
Quebec (Ursel)	1	0	0	0	0	0	2	0	2	0	X	X	5
Prince Edward Island (MacDonald)	0	0	3	0	2	1	0	5	0	2	X	X	13

Team	1	2	3	4	5	6	7	8	9	10	11	12	Final
New Brunswick (Sullivan)	0	0	0	0	2	0	0	2	1	1	0	X	6
Northwest Territories/Yukon (Brazeau)	0	0	0	0	0	2	0	0	0	0	1	X	3

=== Draw 8 ===
Wednesday, March 10, 1:30 pm

Team	1	2	3	4	5	6	7	8	9	10	11	12	Final
Ontario (Gurowka)	1	0	0	1	0	1	0	1	0	0	X	X	4
Alberta (Sokolosky)	0	0	2	0	2	0	1	0	2	2	X	X	9

Team	1	2	3	4	5	6	7	8	9	10	11	12	Final
Quebec (Ursel)	0	1	1	0	0	2	0	1	0	0	1	1	7
Northern Ontario (Lang)	2	0	0	0	1	0	0	0	2	0	0	0	5

Team	1	2	3	4	5	6	7	8	9	10	11	12	Final
Saskatchewan (Anholt)	0	1	0	1	0	1	0	1	0	0	0	0	4
Northwest Territories/Yukon (Brazeau)	1	0	2	0	1	0	1	0	0	0	0	0	5

Team	1	2	3	4	5	6	7	8	9	10	11	12	Final
Manitoba (DeBlonde)	0	0	0	0	2	0	0	0	0	1	2	X	5
Newfoundland (MacDuff)	0	0	0	3	0	2	0	2	0	0	0	X	7

Team	1	2	3	4	5	6	7	8	9	10	11	12	Final
British Columbia (Sparkes)	0	0	1	0	3	0	1	0	0	1	0	X	6
Prince Edward Island (MacDonald)	0	0	0	1	0	0	0	0	0	0	2	X	3

=== Draw 9 ===
Wednesday, March 10, 7:30 pm

Team	1	2	3	4	5	6	7	8	9	10	11	12	Final
Saskatchewan (Anholt)	3	0	3	0	0	1	0	1	0	0	0	X	8
Prince Edward Island (MacDonald)	0	0	0	1	0	0	0	0	0	0	2	X	3

Team	1	2	3	4	5	6	7	8	9	10	11	12	Final
Nova Scotia (Romain)	0	0	0	0	1	0	2	1	0	0	0	X	4
Newfoundland (MacDuff)	2	0	0	2	0	2	0	0	0	2	0	X	8

Team	1	2	3	4	5	6	7	8	9	10	11	12	Final
British Columbia (Sparkes)	0	0	0	0	0	3	0	0	1	0	1	1	6
New Brunswick (Sullivan)	1	0	0	0	1	0	1	0	0	2	0	0	5

Team	1	2	3	4	5	6	7	8	9	10	11	12	Final
Northern Ontario (Lang)	0	0	1	0	2	0	0	4	0	0	2	X	9
Northwest Territories/Yukon (Brazeau)	0	1	0	1	0	0	1	0	2	1	0	X	6

Team	1	2	3	4	5	6	7	8	9	10	11	12	Final
Ontario (Gurowka)	0	0	0	1	0	2	0	0	2	0	0	0	5
Quebec (Ursel)	0	1	0	0	2	0	1	1	0	0	2	1	8

=== Draw 10 ===
Thursday, March 11, 1:30 pm

Team	1	2	3	4	5	6	7	8	9	10	11	12	Final
British Columbia (Sparkes)	1	0	0	2	1	2	2	0	2	0	X	X	10
Nova Scotia (Romain)	0	0	1	0	0	0	0	1	0	0	X	X	2

Team	1	2	3	4	5	6	7	8	9	10	11	12	Final
Manitoba (DeBlonde)	0	2	0	1	0	3	0	1	1	0	2	X	10
Ontario (Gurowka)	1	0	2	0	2	0	1	0	0	1	0	X	7

Team	1	2	3	4	5	6	7	8	9	10	11	12	Final
Alberta (Sokolosky)	0	0	1	0	0	2	0	0	2	0	2	X	7
Newfoundland (MacDuff)	2	2	0	2	0	0	0	3	0	1	0	X	10

Team	1	2	3	4	5	6	7	8	9	10	11	12	Final
Prince Edward Island (MacDonald)	0	0	0	0	0	0	0	0	1	0	2	0	3
New Brunswick (Sullivan)	1	0	0	1	1	0	0	0	0	1	0	2	6

Team	1	2	3	4	5	6	7	8	9	10	11	12	Final
Saskatchewan (Anholt)	2	1	1	1	0	1	0	0	2	0	0	X	8
Northern Ontario (Lang)	0	0	0	0	2	0	1	0	0	1	1	X	5

=== Draw 11 ===
Thursday, March 11, 7:30 pm

Team	1	2	3	4	5	6	7	8	9	10	11	12	Final
Northern Ontario (Lang)	0	0	0	0	0	2	0	2	0	2	0	1	7
Ontario (Gurowka)	1	0	1	0	1	0	1	0	1	0	1	0	6

Team	1	2	3	4	5	6	7	8	9	10	11	12	13	14	Final
Alberta (Sokolosky)	0	0	1	0	0	2	0	1	0	0	0	1	0	0	5
British Columbia (Sparkes)	1	0	0	1	0	0	2	0	1	0	0	0	0	1	6

Team	1	2	3	4	5	6	7	8	9	10	11	12	Final
Northwest Territories/Yukon (Brazeau)	0	2	0	0	1	1	0	0	1	0	0	0	5
Manitoba (DeBlonde)	1	0	0	1	0	0	1	0	0	2	1	2	8

Team	1	2	3	4	5	6	7	8	9	10	11	12	Final
Quebec (Ursel)	0	1	0	1	0	1	2	1	0	0	0	X	6
Saskatchewan (Anholt)	0	0	2	0	0	0	0	0	0	1	0	X	3

Team	1	2	3	4	5	6	7	8	9	10	11	12	Final
Prince Edward Island (MacDonald)	0	1	0	0	0	1	0	0	2	1	1	X	6
Nova Scotia (Romain)	0	0	2	1	4	0	1	0	0	0	0	X	8

=== Draw 12 ===
Friday, March 12, 1:30 pm

Team	1	2	3	4	5	6	7	8	9	10	11	12	13	Final
Manitoba (DeBlonde)	1	0	0	0	0	0	4	0	0	0	0	0	1	6
New Brunswick (Sullivan)	0	1	0	0	0	0	0	1	1	0	1	1	0	5

Team	1	2	3	4	5	6	7	8	9	10	11	12	13	Final
Newfoundland (MacDuff)	1	0	0	0	0	1	0	0	0	0	0	2	1	5
Saskatchewan (Anholt)	0	0	0	0	0	0	0	0	2	0	2	0	0	4

Team	1	2	3	4	5	6	7	8	9	10	11	12	Final
Quebec (Ursel)	0	0	0	0	2	0	2	0	2	2	X	X	8
Nova Scotia (Romain)	0	0	0	1	0	1	0	1	0	0	X	X	3

Team	1	2	3	4	5	6	7	8	9	10	11	12	Final
Alberta (Sokolosky)	0	2	0	1	0	1	0	0	1	0	1	X	6
Northern Ontario (Lang)	2	0	1	0	1	0	2	1	0	3	0	X	10

Team	1	2	3	4	5	6	7	8	9	10	11	12	Final
Northwest Territories/Yukon (Brazeau)	0	0	1	0	2	0	0	0	1	0	2	0	6
British Columbia (Sparkes)	0	1	0	1	0	2	0	1	0	1	0	1	7

=== Draw 13 ===
Friday, March 12, 7:30 pm

Team	1	2	3	4	5	6	7	8	9	10	11	12	Final
Newfoundland (MacDuff)	0	1	0	0	3	3	1	0	0	1	X	X	9
Northwest Territories/Yukon (Brazeau)	0	0	0	0	0	0	0	1	0	0	X	X	1

Team	1	2	3	4	5	6	7	8	9	10	11	12	Final
New Brunswick (Sullivan)	0	0	1	0	0	1	1	0	1	0	0	X	4
Quebec (Ursel)	2	1	0	3	0	0	0	1	0	1	1	X	9

Team	1	2	3	4	5	6	7	8	9	10	11	12	Final
Prince Edward Island (MacDonald)	1	0	1	0	0	1	0	0	1	0	1	0	5
Alberta (Sokolosky)	0	2	0	0	1	0	1	0	0	2	0	1	7

Team	1	2	3	4	5	6	7	8	9	10	11	12	Final
British Columbia (Sparkes)	1	1	0	0	1	0	0	3	0	0	1	0	7
Ontario (Gurowka)	0	0	1	1	0	0	2	0	2	0	0	2	8

Team	1	2	3	4	5	6	7	8	9	10	11	12	Final
Manitoba (DeBlonde)	0	1	0	2	0	2	0	0	0	1	0	0	6
Saskatchewan (Anholt)	0	0	1	0	1	0	1	0	0	0	1	1	5

=== Draw 14 ===
Saturday, March 13, 12:00 pm

Team	1	2	3	4	5	6	7	8	9	10	11	12	Final
Alberta (Sokolosky)	0	1	0	0	0	0	0	0	0	1	0	X	2
Quebec (Ursel)	2	0	0	1	1	1	0	0	1	0	1	X	7

Team	1	2	3	4	5	6	7	8	9	10	11	12	13	Final
Prince Edward Island (MacDonald)	0	1	0	0	1	0	0	0	0	1	0	2	0	5
Northwest Territories/Yukon (Brazeau)	1	0	0	1	0	1	0	2	0	0	0	0	1	6

Team	1	2	3	4	5	6	7	8	9	10	11	12	Final
New Brunswick (Sullivan)	1	0	0	0	0	0	1	1	0	0	1	3	7
Northern Ontario (Lang)	0	1	0	0	1	1	0	0	1	0	0	0	4

Team	1	2	3	4	5	6	7	8	9	10	11	12	13	Final
Nova Scotia (Romain)	1	1	0	0	0	1	0	3	0	0	1	0	0	7
Manitoba (DeBlonde)	0	0	1	0	1	0	1	0	2	0	0	2	2	9

Team	1	2	3	4	5	6	7	8	9	10	11	12	Final
Newfoundland (MacDuff)	1	0	1	0	0	1	0	2	1	3	0	X	9
Ontario (Gurowka)	0	0	0	1	0	0	2	0	0	0	1	X	4

== Awards ==
=== All-Star Team ===
The media selected the following curlers as All-Stars.

Position	Name	Team
Skip	Jack MacDuff	Newfoundland
Third	Bert Gretzinger	British Columbia
Second	Don Aitken	Quebec
Lead	Keiven Bauer	British Columbia

=== Ross G.L. Harstone Award ===
The Ross Harstone Award was presented to the player chosen by their fellow peers as the curler who best represented Harstone's high ideals of good sportsmanship, observance of the rules, exemplary conduct and curling ability.

Name	Team	Position
Jim Ursel	Quebec	Skip
