= Leo Hebert =

Canadian curler (1931–2020)

- Curler
- Born: October 27, 1931; Athabasca, Alberta
- Died: October 28, 2020 (aged 89)

Curling career
- Brier: 1964, 1970, 1977
Medal record
Representing Canada
Men's Curling
World championships
Gold medal – first place	1964 Calgary	Team
Macdonald Brier
Representing British Columbia
Gold medal – first place	1964 Charlottetown
Silver medal – second place	1977 Montreal
Bronze medal – third place	1970 Winnipeg

Leo W. Hebert (October 27, 1931 – October 28, 2020) was a Canadian curler. He played as third on the Lyall Dagg rink that won the 1964 Brier and World Championship.

In addition to his Brier and World championships, Hebert won three BC men's championships, three BC Senior Men's Championships and a BC Men's Masters Championship. Hebert was also a blind curling coach for over 28 years. He was inducted into the Canadian Curling Hall of Fame in 2000. He is also a member of the BC Sports Hall of Fame.

== Personal life ==
Hebert began curling at 9 years old. Hebert moved to Vancouver after high school and worked for Imperial Oil. At the time of the 1964 Worlds, Hebert worked for Allied Heat and Fuel Ltd. in Vancouver. In addition to curling, his background included ice hockey, baseball and softball. He had three children.
