= Art Lobel =

Canadian curler

- Curler
- Born: Virden, Manitoba

Curling career
- Member Association: Quebec (until c. 1978); Ontario (c. 1978–present)
- Brier: 5 (1970, 1972, 1975, 1976, 1977)
- World Championship: 1 (1977)
Medal record
Representing Canada
World Curling Championships
Silver medal – second place	1977 Karlstad
Representing Quebec
Macdonald Brier
Gold medal – first place	1977 Montreal
Silver medal – second place	1972 St. John's
Bronze medal – third place	1976 Regina

Arthur L. Lobel (born c. 1935) is a Canadian curler from Montreal, Quebec. He was the third of the 1977 Brier Champion team, representing Quebec. He is a member of the Canadian Curling Hall of Fame.

Lobel moved to Thornhill in about 1978.

He also won six Ontario Senior Championships (1986, 1989, 1992, 1994, 1998 and 1999), three Canadian Senior Curling Championships (1986, 1989, 1992), and the 2000 Canadian Masters Curling Championships.

Lobel was an engineer with CIL. Lobel's son Rob is also a curler.
