= Don Aitken =

Canadian curler

- Curler
- Born: 1945 or 1946 (age 80–81); Tillsonburg, Ontario

Curling career
- Brier: 9 (1970, 1972, 1975, 1976, 1977, 1979, 1980, 1982, 1985)
- World Championship: 1 (1977)
Medal record
Representing Canada
World Curling Championships
Silver medal – second place	1977 Karlstad
Representing Quebec
Macdonald Brier
Gold medal – first place	1977 Montreal
Silver medal – second place	1972 St. John's
Bronze medal – third place	1976 Regina

Donald J. Aitken (born c. 1945) is a Canadian curler from Montreal. He was the second of the 1977 Brier Champion team, representing Quebec. He is a member of the Canadian Curling Hall of Fame.

Aitken worked in textiles.
