= Lyall Dagg =

Canadian curler (1929–1975)

- Curler
- Born: July 27, 1929; Tisdale, Saskatchewan
- Died: May 14, 1975 (aged 45); Vancouver, British Columbia

Curling career
- Brier: 2 (1964, 1970)
Medal record
Representing Canada
Men's Curling
World championships
Gold medal – first place	1964 Calgary	Team
Macdonald Brier
Representing British Columbia
Gold medal – first place	1964 Charlottetown
Bronze medal – third place	1970 Winnipeg

Lyall Austin Dagg (July 27, 1929 – May 14, 1975) was a Canadian curler and World Champion. He is the father of Elaine Dagg-Jackson, who also became a curler.

He won a gold medal at the 1964 World Curling Championships. Outside of curling, he was employed as an account executive.

Dagg died at the age of 45 from a rare blood disorder. He was inducted into the Canadian Curling Hall of Fame in 2000.

== Personal life ==
Dagg was of Irish, Scottish, English and Dutch descent. Dagg was a former printer, journalist, business editor and public relations director.

Dagg moved to BC in 1943. He was first employed as a printer, and became a write-reporter and business editor for the Vancouver News-Herald. In 1955 he joined the public relations department for Crown Zellerbach Canada, later becoming director of public relations, and then manager of marketing services in Richmond, British Columbia and then in Kelowna in 1973. Dagg was also involved in the BC Centennial Committee, the Festival of Forestry, the Vancouver Board of Trade, the BC Heart Foundation and the Kelowna Chamber of Commerce.
