= Jane Hooper =

Jane Hooper may refer to:

- Jane Hooper-Perroud (born c. 1962), Canadian curler
- Jane Margaret Hooper (1818–1907), British writer
- Eleven (Stranger Things), a fictional character in the Netflix series Stranger Things, whose name becomes Jane Hopper
