= 1996 Scott Tournament of Hearts =

Canadian women's curling championship

- Host city: Thunder Bay, Ontario
- Arena: Fort William Gardens
- Dates: February 17–25
- Attendance: 51,029
- Winner: Ontario
- Curling club: St. Catharines CC, St. Catharines
- Skip: Marilyn Bodogh
- Third: Kim Gellard
- Second: Corie Beveridge
- Lead: Jane Hooper Perroud
- Alternate: Lisa Savage
- Finalist: Alberta (Cheryl Kullman)

The 1996 Scott Tournament of Hearts, the Canadian women's national curling championship, was held from February 17 to 25, 1996 at the Fort William Gardens in Thunder Bay, Ontario. The total attendance for the week was 51,029.

Team Ontario, who was skipped by Marilyn Bodogh won the title on home soil defeating Cheryl Kullman's Alberta rink in the final 7-4. This was Ontario's fourth title overall (five counting Team Canada) and the fifth time that the host province had won the event. Bodogh's victory was her second title as a skip with her other championship coming in 1986. The ten years between title wins by Bodogh set a then-record for the longest period between title wins breaking the mark of eight years set by Janet Arnott, Connie Laliberte, and Joyce McKee.

Bodogh's rink would go onto represent Canada at the 1996 World Women's Curling Championship on home soil in Hamilton, Ontario, which they also won as well. Additionally, they also clinched a berth in the 1997 Canadian Olympic Curling Trials.

== Teams ==
The teams were listed as follows:

Team Canada	Alberta	British Columbia	Manitoba
Fort Rouge CC, Winnipeg Skip: Connie Laliberte; Third: Cathy Overton-Clapham; Second: Cathy Gauthier; Lead: Janet Arnott; Alternate: Debbie Jones-Walker	Calgary WC, Calgary Skip: Cheryl Kullman; Third: Karen Russ; Second: Barb Sherrington; Lead: Judy Pendergast; Alternate: Vicki Sjolie	Fort St. John CC, Fort St. John Skip: Jodi Busche; Third: Lorelei Garnett; Second: Debra London; Lead: Bev Wieler; Alternate: Anita Pendergast	Brandon CC, Brandon Skip: Maureen Bonar; Third: Gerri Cooke; Second: Allyson Bell; Lead: Lois Fowler; Alternate: Patti Wuthrich
New Brunswick	Newfoundland	Nova Scotia	Ontario
Carleton CC, Saint John Skip: Barb Hutton; Third: Wendy Shephard; Second: Shelly Snider (Note: For Draws 6–14 and 17 (seven games), Team New Brunswick alternate Mona Train threw second stones, second Shelly Snider threw lead stones while lead Paula Whipple sat out.); Lead: Paula Whipple; Alternate: Mona Train	St. John's CC, St. John's Skip: Laura Phillips; Third: Cathy Cunningham; Second: Kathy Kerr; Lead: Heather Martin; Alternate: Susan Thomas	Halifax CC, Halifax Skip: Colleen Jones; Third: Kay Zinck; Second: Kim Kelly; Lead: Nancy Delahunt; Alternate: Monica Moriarty	St. Catharines CC, St. Catharines Skip: Marilyn Bodogh; Third: Kim Gellard; Second: Corie Beveridge; Lead: Jane Hooper Perroud; Alternate: Lisa Savage
Prince Edward Island	Quebec	Saskatchewan	Yukon/Northwest Territories
Charlottetown CC, Charlottetown Skip: Susan McInnis; Third: Kathy O'Rourke; Second: Tricia MacGregor; Lead: Leslie Allan; Alternate: Julie Scales	Laviolette CC, Trois-Rivières Skip: Stephanie Marchand; Third: Jessica Marchand; Second: Brenda Nicholls; Lead: Julie Rainville; Alternate: Marie Ferland	Granite CC, Saskatoon Skip: Sherry Scheirich; Third: Colleen Zielke; Second: Sandra Mulroney; Lead: Judy Leonard; Alternate: Kim Hodson	Whitehorse CC, Whitehorse Skip: Donna Scott (Note: For Draws 10–11 and 13–16 (five games), Team Yukon/Northwest Territories skip Donna Scott threw third stones while third Dianne Nohr threw skip stones.); Third: Dianne Nohr; Second: Peggy Dorosz; Lead: Naomi Cey; Alternate: Rose Putland

== Map of teams ==
Team Canada Provincial Winners

== Round Robin standings ==
Final Round Robin standings

Key
Teams to Playoffs
Teams to Tiebreakers

Team	Skip	W	L	PF	PA	EW	EL	BE	SE	S%
Ontario	Marilyn Bodogh	10	1	92	48	48	38	4	13	80%
Alberta	Cheryl Kullman	7	4	76	65	52	40	3	17	74%
Saskatchewan	Sherry Scheirich	7	4	75	51	46	37	11	13	77%
Canada	Connie Laliberte	6	5	72	72	48	45	8	12	77%
Manitoba	Maureen Bonar	6	5	66	64	45	39	7	13	76%
British Columbia	Jodi Busche	6	5	70	63	44	43	5	14	70%
Prince Edward Island	Susan McInnis	6	5	67	61	44	45	10	13	77%
Nova Scotia	Colleen Jones	6	5	70	67	46	42	6	13	77%
Newfoundland	Laura Phillips	5	6	74	75	46	47	4	15	74%
Quebec	Stephanie Marchand	4	7	57	70	39	48	12	9	75%
New Brunswick	Barb Hutton	2	9	49	81	39	48	4	12	64%
Yukon/Northwest Territories	Donna Scott	1	10	43	94	31	56	2	3	68%

== Round Robin results ==
All draw times are in Eastern Standard Time (UTC-05:00).

=== Draw 1 ===
Saturday, February 17, 2:30 pm

Sheet A	1	2	3	4	5	6	7	8	9	10	Final
Alberta (Kullman) 🔨	1	0	0	1	1	0	0	0	X	X	3
Manitoba (Bonar)	0	0	2	0	0	3	2	3	X	X	10

Sheet B	1	2	3	4	5	6	7	8	9	10	Final
Newfoundland (Phillips) 🔨	1	0	1	0	1	0	1	1	0	X	5
Ontario (Bodogh)	0	1	0	2	0	4	0	0	3	X	10

Sheet C	1	2	3	4	5	6	7	8	9	10	Final
Saskatchewan (Scheirich) 🔨	3	2	0	1	1	0	3	0	1	X	11
New Brunswick (Hutton)	0	0	2	0	0	2	0	1	0	X	5

Sheet D	1	2	3	4	5	6	7	8	9	10	Final
Prince Edward Island (McInnis) 🔨	0	1	0	2	3	1	0	2	1	X	10
Yukon/Northwest Territories (Scott)	0	0	1	0	0	0	1	0	0	X	2

=== Draw 2 ===
Saturday, February 17, 7:30 pm

Sheet A	1	2	3	4	5	6	7	8	9	10	Final
New Brunswick (Hutton) 🔨	0	0	1	0	2	0	0	1	0	X	4
Newfoundland (Phillips)	1	1	0	1	0	3	1	0	2	X	9

Sheet B	1	2	3	4	5	6	7	8	9	10	Final
Canada (Laliberte) 🔨	0	2	0	2	0	2	2	0	1	X	9
Quebec (Marchand)	0	0	2	0	1	0	0	1	0	X	4

Sheet C	1	2	3	4	5	6	7	8	9	10	Final
British Columbia (Busche) 🔨	1	0	0	0	1	0	3	0	0	2	7
Nova Scotia (Jones)	0	1	1	1	0	0	0	1	0	0	4

Sheet D	1	2	3	4	5	6	7	8	9	10	Final
Ontario (Bodogh) 🔨	2	0	1	0	3	0	2	0	1	X	9
Alberta (Kullman)	0	0	0	2	0	1	0	1	0	X	4

=== Draw 3 ===
Sunday, February 18, 9:30 am

Sheet B	1	2	3	4	5	6	7	8	9	10	Final
Alberta (Kullman) 🔨	1	0	1	1	1	0	0	4	X	X	8
British Columbia (Busche)	0	1	0	0	0	1	0	0	X	X	2

Sheet C	1	2	3	4	5	6	7	8	9	10	Final
Quebec (Marchand) 🔨	0	0	0	0	1	0	0	2	1	0	4
Prince Edward Island (McInnis)	0	0	1	0	0	1	2	0	0	2	6

=== Draw 4 ===
Sunday, February 18, 2:30 pm

Sheet A	1	2	3	4	5	6	7	8	9	10	Final
Yukon/Northwest Territories (Scott) 🔨	0	1	0	0	0	1	0	0	0	X	2
Saskatchewan (Scheirich)	0	0	1	1	1	0	2	1	2	X	8

Sheet B	1	2	3	4	5	6	7	8	9	10	Final
Nova Scotia (Jones) 🔨	2	0	2	0	1	0	2	0	6	X	13
Canada (Laliberte)	0	3	0	1	0	1	0	1	0	X	6

Sheet C	1	2	3	4	5	6	7	8	9	10	Final
Newfoundland (Phillips) 🔨	4	0	2	3	0	3	X	X	X	X	12
Manitoba (Bonar)	0	1	0	0	1	0	X	X	X	X	2

Sheet D	1	2	3	4	5	6	7	8	9	10	Final
British Columbia (Busche) 🔨	1	0	0	2	1	0	0	3	0	X	7
Quebec (Marchand)	0	1	1	0	0	1	0	0	2	X	5

=== Draw 5 ===
Sunday, February 18, 7:30 pm

Sheet A	1	2	3	4	5	6	7	8	9	10	Final
Manitoba (Bonar) 🔨	0	3	0	0	2	1	2	1	X	X	9
Nova Scotia (Jones)	0	0	2	1	0	0	0	0	X	X	3

Sheet B	1	2	3	4	5	6	7	8	9	10	Final
Prince Edward Island (McInnis) 🔨	0	1	0	2	0	2	0	0	0	0	5
New Brunswick (Hutton)	0	0	2	0	1	0	0	1	1	1	6

Sheet C	1	2	3	4	5	6	7	8	9	10	Final
Canada (Laliberte) 🔨	1	0	1	0	0	0	0	3	2	X	7
Yukon/Northwest Territories (Scott)	0	0	0	1	0	0	0	0	0	X	1

Sheet D	1	2	3	4	5	6	7	8	9	10	Final
Saskatchewan (Scheirich) 🔨	2	0	0	0	2	0	0	0	2	1	7
Ontario (Bodogh)	0	1	1	1	0	1	0	0	0	0	4

=== Draw 6 ===
Monday, February 19, 9:30 am

Sheet A	1	2	3	4	5	6	7	8	9	10	Final
Canada (Laliberte) 🔨	0	0	3	1	0	1	0	3	0	X	8
New Brunswick (Hutton)	1	1	0	0	1	0	0	0	2	X	5

Sheet B	1	2	3	4	5	6	7	8	9	10	Final
Saskatchewan (Scheirich) 🔨	0	2	0	2	0	1	0	3	X	X	8
Manitoba (Bonar)	0	0	1	0	0	0	1	0	X	X	2

Sheet C	1	2	3	4	5	6	7	8	9	10	Final
Ontario (Bodogh) 🔨	2	0	0	0	1	0	2	0	2	2	9
Nova Scotia (Jones)	0	0	1	0	0	2	0	1	0	0	4

Sheet D	1	2	3	4	5	6	7	8	9	10	Final
Yukon/Northwest Territories (Scott) 🔨	1	0	4	0	0	1	0	0	1	X	7
Newfoundland (Phillips)	0	1	0	2	3	0	2	3	0	X	11

=== Draw 7 ===
Monday, February 19, 2:30 pm

Sheet A	1	2	3	4	5	6	7	8	9	10	Final
Newfoundland (Phillips) 🔨	0	0	0	1	0	0	2	X	X	X	3
British Columbia (Busche)	4	1	1	0	1	1	0	X	X	X	8

Sheet B	1	2	3	4	5	6	7	8	9	10	Final
Manitoba (Bonar) 🔨	2	0	0	1	0	1	0	0	1	X	5
Quebec (Marchand)	0	0	2	0	2	0	0	3	0	X	7

Sheet C	1	2	3	4	5	6	7	8	9	10	11	Final
Prince Edward Island (McInnis) 🔨	1	0	2	0	1	0	0	2	0	0	0	6
Ontario (Bodogh)	0	0	0	3	0	1	0	0	0	2	1	7

Sheet D	1	2	3	4	5	6	7	8	9	10	Final
New Brunswick (Hutton) 🔨	1	0	0	0	0	1	0	0	X	X	2
Alberta (Kullman)	0	0	2	1	1	0	1	2	X	X	7

=== Draw 8 ===
Monday, February 19, 7:30 pm

Sheet A	1	2	3	4	5	6	7	8	9	10	Final
Nova Scotia (Jones) 🔨	0	1	0	1	0	1	0	0	0	0	3
Prince Edward Island (McInnis)	0	0	2	0	0	0	0	0	1	1	4

Sheet B	1	2	3	4	5	6	7	8	9	10	Final
British Columbia (Busche) 🔨	2	0	3	2	2	0	3	X	X	X	12
Yukon/Northwest Territories (Scott)	0	1	0	0	0	1	0	X	X	X	2

Sheet C	1	2	3	4	5	6	7	8	9	10	Final
Quebec (Marchand) 🔨	0	0	0	1	0	2	0	0	1	0	4
Saskatchewan (Scheirich)	1	0	0	0	1	0	1	2	0	1	6

Sheet D	1	2	3	4	5	6	7	8	9	10	Final
Alberta (Kullman) 🔨	2	1	0	3	0	1	0	2	0	X	9
Canada (Laliberte)	0	0	0	0	3	0	2	0	1	X	6

=== Draw 9 ===
Tuesday, February 20, 9:30 am

Sheet A	1	2	3	4	5	6	7	8	9	10	Final
Ontario (Bodogh) 🔨	1	0	2	0	1	0	1	2	0	X	7
Quebec (Marchand)	0	1	0	0	0	1	0	0	1	X	3

Sheet B	1	2	3	4	5	6	7	8	9	10	Final
Prince Edward Island (McInnis) 🔨	0	2	0	1	0	0	1	1	0	1	6
Manitoba (Bonar)	0	0	1	0	1	1	0	0	1	0	4

Sheet C	1	2	3	4	5	6	7	8	9	10	Final
British Columbia (Busche) 🔨	0	0	3	0	2	0	0	2	0	X	7
New Brunswick (Hutton)	1	1	0	1	0	2	0	0	1	X	6

Sheet D	1	2	3	4	5	6	7	8	9	10	Final
Nova Scotia (Jones) 🔨	0	0	2	0	0	2	0	0	0	1	5
Saskatchewan (Scheirich)	0	0	0	0	2	0	0	0	1	0	3

=== Draw 10 ===
Tuesday, February 20, 2:30 pm

Sheet A	1	2	3	4	5	6	7	8	9	10	Final
Saskatchewan (Scheirich) 🔨	1	0	2	1	0	0	0	2	3	X	9
British Columbia (Busche)	0	1	0	0	1	0	0	0	0	X	2

Sheet B	1	2	3	4	5	6	7	8	9	10	Final
New Brunswick (Hutton) 🔨	0	0	1	0	0	1	0	2	0	X	4
Nova Scotia (Jones)	1	1	0	0	3	0	2	0	1	X	8

Sheet C	1	2	3	4	5	6	7	8	9	10	Final
Yukon/Northwest Territories (Scott) 🔨	1	0	0	1	0	1	0	2	0	0	5
Alberta (Kullman)	0	2	1	0	1	0	1	0	2	1	8

Sheet D	1	2	3	4	5	6	7	8	9	10	11	Final
Newfoundland (Phillips) 🔨	0	0	0	1	1	0	2	0	0	1	0	5
Canada (Laliberte)	0	0	1	0	0	1	0	2	1	0	2	7

=== Draw 11 ===
Tuesday, February 20, 7:30 pm

Sheet A	1	2	3	4	5	6	7	8	9	10	Final
Canada (Laliberte) 🔨	0	0	1	0	1	0	1	0	0	X	3
Ontario (Bodogh)	0	1	0	1	0	1	0	3	3	X	9

Sheet B	1	2	3	4	5	6	7	8	9	10	Final
Quebec (Marchand) 🔨	0	0	2	1	0	1	0	0	0	1	5
Newfoundland (Phillips)	1	0	0	0	0	0	1	0	2	0	4

Sheet C	1	2	3	4	5	6	7	8	9	10	Final
Manitoba (Bonar) 🔨	0	1	0	2	2	1	2	0	X	X	8
Yukon/Northwest Territories (Scott)	0	0	2	0	0	0	0	1	X	X	3

Sheet D	1	2	3	4	5	6	7	8	9	10	Final
Alberta (Kullman) 🔨	1	0	1	0	0	0	1	1	1	0	5
Prince Edward Island (McInnis)	0	2	0	0	1	2	0	0	0	4	9

=== Draw 12 ===
Wednesday, February 21, 9:30 am

Sheet A	1	2	3	4	5	6	7	8	9	10	Final
Quebec (Marchand) 🔨	1	0	1	0	1	1	0	0	5	X	9
Alberta (Kullman)	0	1	0	2	0	0	2	1	0	X	6

Sheet B	1	2	3	4	5	6	7	8	9	10	Final
Ontario (Bodogh) 🔨	3	0	1	5	1	1	X	X	X	X	11
Yukon/Northwest Territories (Scott)	0	1	0	0	0	0	X	X	X	X	1

Sheet C	1	2	3	4	5	6	7	8	9	10	Final
Nova Scotia (Jones) 🔨	0	0	1	3	1	0	1	0	1	2	9
Newfoundland (Phillips)	2	1	0	0	0	1	0	1	0	0	5

Sheet D	1	2	3	4	5	6	7	8	9	10	Final
Canada (Laliberte) 🔨	1	0	1	0	1	0	1	0	2	0	6
Manitoba (Bonar)	0	3	0	2	0	1	0	1	0	0	7

=== Draw 13 ===
Wednesday, February 21, 2:30 pm

Sheet A	1	2	3	4	5	6	7	8	9	10	Final
Prince Edward Island (McInnis) 🔨	1	0	0	1	0	0	0	0	0	X	2
British Columbia (Busche)	0	0	2	0	3	1	1	0	2	X	9

Sheet B	1	2	3	4	5	6	7	8	9	10	Final
Saskatchewan (Scheirich) 🔨	1	0	0	0	0	2	0	0	2	1	6
Canada (Laliberte)	0	0	2	1	1	0	0	1	0	0	5

Sheet C	1	2	3	4	5	6	7	8	9	10	Final
New Brunswick (Hutton) 🔨	0	1	0	0	0	0	1	1	1	1	5
Quebec (Marchand)	0	0	0	1	1	1	0	0	0	0	3

Sheet D	1	2	3	4	5	6	7	8	9	10	Final
Yukon/Northwest Territories (Scott) 🔨	1	0	1	0	3	0	0	0	1	0	6
Nova Scotia (Jones)	0	1	0	1	0	1	1	2	0	2	8

=== Draw 14 ===
Wednesday, February 21, 7:30 pm

Sheet A	1	2	3	4	5	6	7	8	9	10	11	Final
Newfoundland (Phillips) 🔨	0	1	0	2	0	0	0	2	0	2	2	9
Prince Edward Island (McInnis)	1	0	1	0	1	1	2	0	1	0	0	7

Sheet B	1	2	3	4	5	6	7	8	9	10	Final
British Columbia (Busche) 🔨	2	0	1	0	2	0	1	0	1	X	7
Ontario (Bodogh)	0	2	0	2	0	3	0	2	0	X	9

Sheet C	1	2	3	4	5	6	7	8	9	10	Final
Alberta (Kullman) 🔨	1	0	1	0	2	0	1	0	1	3	9
Saskatchewan (Scheirich)	0	2	0	2	0	1	0	1	0	0	6

Sheet D	1	2	3	4	5	6	7	8	9	10	11	Final
Manitoba (Bonar) 🔨	0	2	0	0	0	1	1	0	1	0	1	6
New Brunswick (Hutton)	0	0	2	0	1	0	0	1	0	1	0	5

=== Draw 15 ===
Thursday, February 22, 9:30 am

Sheet A	1	2	3	4	5	6	7	8	9	10	Final
New Brunswick (Hutton) 🔨	1	0	0	0	2	1	0	0	0	X	4
Yukon/Northwest Territories (Scott)	0	3	0	2	0	0	1	1	1	X	8

Sheet B	1	2	3	4	5	6	7	8	9	10	Final
Alberta (Kullman) 🔨	3	0	0	2	1	0	2	1	X	X	9
Newfoundland (Phillips)	0	1	1	0	0	1	0	0	X	X	3

Sheet C	1	2	3	4	5	6	7	8	9	10	11	Final
Canada (Laliberte) 🔨	2	0	0	2	0	1	1	0	0	0	1	7
British Columbia (Busche)	0	1	1	0	1	0	0	1	1	1	0	6

Sheet D	1	2	3	4	5	6	7	8	9	10	Final
Saskatchewan (Scheirich) 🔨	1	0	0	1	0	0	0	2	0	X	4
Prince Edward Island (McInnis)	0	1	0	0	1	3	0	0	0	X	5

=== Draw 16 ===
Thursday, February 22, 2:30 pm

Sheet A	1	2	3	4	5	6	7	8	9	10	Final
Manitoba (Bonar) 🔨	1	0	1	1	0	1	0	1	0	X	5
Ontario (Bodogh)	0	2	0	0	1	0	3	0	2	X	8

Sheet B	1	2	3	4	5	6	7	8	9	10	Final
Nova Scotia (Jones) 🔨	1	0	1	0	0	1	0	1	0	X	4
Alberta (Kullman)	0	1	0	3	1	0	2	0	1	X	8

Sheet C	1	2	3	4	5	6	7	8	9	10	Final
Prince Edward Island (McInnis) 🔨	0	2	0	2	0	2	0	0	1	0	7
Canada (Laliberte)	1	0	1	0	1	0	2	2	0	1	8

Sheet D	1	2	3	4	5	6	7	8	9	10	Final
Yukon/Northwest Territories (Scott) 🔨	2	0	1	0	0	1	0	0	2	X	6
Quebec (Marchand) 🔨	0	1	0	1	1	0	2	2	0	X	7

=== Draw 17 ===
Thursday, February 22, 7:30 pm

Sheet A	1	2	3	4	5	6	7	8	9	10	Final
Quebec (Marchand) 🔨	1	0	2	0	0	3	0	0	0	X	6
Nova Scotia (Jones)	0	2	0	1	0	0	3	1	2	X	9

Sheet B	1	2	3	4	5	6	7	8	9	10	Final
Newfoundland (Phillips) 🔨	3	0	2	0	0	1	0	1	0	1	8
Saskatchewan (Scheirich)	0	3	0	2	0	0	2	0	0	0	7

Sheet C	1	2	3	4	5	6	7	8	9	10	Final
Ontario (Bodogh) 🔨	0	4	0	0	4	1	X	X	X	X	9
New Brunswick (Hutton)	0	0	1	2	0	0	X	X	X	X	3

Sheet D	1	2	3	4	5	6	7	8	9	10	Final
British Columbia (Busche) 🔨	1	0	0	0	1	0	1	0	0	X	3
Manitoba (Bonar)	0	1	0	1	0	2	0	1	3	X	8

== Tiebreakers ==
				To 3 vs. 4
		Manitoba	9
Nova Scotia	9	Nova Scotia	2
British Columbia	5			Manitoba	2
				Canada	5
		Prince Edward Island	5
		Canada	6

=== Round 1 ===
Friday, February 23, 6:30 am

Sheet A	1	2	3	4	5	6	7	8	9	10	Final
Nova Scotia (Jones) 🔨	1	2	0	1	0	3	0	1	1	X	9
British Columbia (Busche)	0	0	2	0	2	0	1	0	0	X	5

Player percentages
Nova Scotia		British Columbia	
Nancy Delahunt	76%	Bev Wieler	71%
Kim Kelly	60%	Debra London	69%
Kay Zinck	69%	Lorelei Garnett	69%
Colleen Jones	82%	Jodi Busche	58%
Total	72%	Total	67%

=== Round 2 ===
Friday, February 23, 10:30 am

Sheet B	1	2	3	4	5	6	7	8	9	10	Final
Nova Scotia (Jones)	0	0	1	0	1	0	0	0	X	X	2
Manitoba (Bonar) 🔨	1	1	0	2	0	2	1	2	X	X	9

Player percentages
Nova Scotia		Manitoba	
Nancy Delahunt	92%	Lois Fowler	97%
Kim Kelly	81%	Allyson Bell	84%
Kay Zinck	78%	Gerri Cooke	80%
Colleen Jones	75%	Maureen Bonar	95%
Total	82%	Total	89%

Sheet D	1	2	3	4	5	6	7	8	9	10	Final
Prince Edward Island (McInnis) 🔨	0	1	1	0	2	0	1	0	0	0	5
Canada (Laliberte)	0	0	0	3	0	1	0	1	0	1	6

Player percentages
Prince Edward Island		Canada	
Leslie Allan	65%	Janet Arnott	91%
Tricia MacGregor	85%	Cathy Gauthier	76%
Kathy O'Rourke	83%	Cathy Overton-Clapham	95%
Susan McInnis	76%	Connie Laliberte	78%
Total	77%	Total	85%

=== Round 3 ===
Friday, February 23, 2:30 pm

Sheet C	1	2	3	4	5	6	7	8	9	10	Final
Manitoba (Bonar) 🔨	1	0	0	0	0	1	0	0	0	X	2
Canada (Laliberte)	0	2	0	0	0	0	1	0	2	X	5

Player percentages
Manitoba		Canada	
Lois Fowler	88%	Janet Arnott	92%
Allyson Bell	79%	Cathy Gauthier	86%
Gerri Cooke	78%	Cathy Overton-Clapham	90%
Maureen Bonar	87%	Connie Laliberte	90%
Total	82%	Total	89%

== Playoffs ==
Page playoff system
1	Ontario	7
2	Alberta	12
3	Saskatchewan	4
4	Canada	7

Semifinal
1	Ontario	6
3	Canada	5

Final
2	Alberta	4
1	Ontario	7

=== 1 vs. 2 ===
Friday, February 23, 7:30 pm

Sheet C	1	2	3	4	5	6	7	8	9	10	Final
Ontario (Bodogh) 🔨	2	1	0	2	0	0	0	2	0	X	7
Alberta (Kullman)	0	0	4	0	3	2	0	0	3	X	12

Player percentages
Ontario		Alberta	
Jane Hooper Perroud	78%	Judy Pendergast	80%
Corie Beveridge	89%	Barb Sherrington	74%
Kim Gellard	69%	Karen Russ	65%
Marilyn Bodogh	75%	Cheryl Kullman	86%
Total	78%	Total	76%

=== 3 vs. 4 ===
Friday, February 23, 7:30 pm

Sheet B	1	2	3	4	5	6	7	8	9	10	Final
Saskatchewan (Scheirich) 🔨	0	1	0	0	2	0	0	0	1	X	4
Canada (Laliberte)	0	0	1	2	0	1	1	2	0	X	7

Player percentages
Saskatchewan		Canada	
Judy Leonard	84%	Janet Arnott	83%
Sandra Mulroney	80%	Cathy Gauthier	75%
Colleen Zielke	65%	Cathy Overton-Clapham	82%
Sherry Scheirich	62%	Connie Laliberte	85%
Total	73%	Total	81%

=== Semifinal ===
Saturday, February 24, 2:30 pm

Sheet C	1	2	3	4	5	6	7	8	9	10	Final
Ontario (Bodogh) 🔨	2	0	0	1	0	1	1	0	1	0	6
Canada (Laliberte)	0	0	1	0	1	0	0	2	0	1	5

Player percentages
Ontario		Canada	
Jane Hooper Perroud	88%	Janet Arnott	91%
Corie Beveridge	86%	Cathy Gauthier	85%
Kim Gellard	80%	Cathy Overton-Clapham	88%
Marilyn Bodogh	89%	Connie Laliberte	80%
Total	86%	Total	86%

=== Final ===
Sunday, February 25, 1:30 pm

Sheet C	1	2	3	4	5	6	7	8	9	10	Final
Ontario (Bodogh) 🔨	0	2	0	0	0	3	0	1	1	X	7
Alberta (Kullman)	0	0	0	1	1	0	2	0	0	X	4

Player percentages
Ontario		Alberta	
Jane Hooper Perroud	78%	Judy Pendergast	89%
Corie Beveridge	90%	Barb Sherrington	78%
Kim Gellard	85%	Karen Russ	79%
Marilyn Bodogh	89%	Cheryl Kullman	72%
Total	86%	Total	79%

== Statistics ==
=== Top 5 player percentages ===
Final Round Robin Percentages

Key
All-Star Team

Leads	%
(Ontario) Jane Hooper Perroud	82
(Nova Scotia) Nancy Delahunt	81
(Manitoba) Lois Fowler	79
(Alberta) Judy Pendergast	78
(Newfoundland and Labrador) Heather Martin	77
(Quebec) Julie Rainville	77
(Saskatchewan) Judy Leonard	77
(Canada) Janet Arnott	77

Seconds	%
(Nova Scotia) Kim Kelly	79
(Ontario) Corie Beveridge	78
(Canada) Cathy Gauthier	77
(Prince Edward Island) Tricia MacGregor	77
(Saskatchewan) Sandra Mulroney	76

Thirds	%
(Ontario) Kim Gellard	79
(Canada) Cathy Overton-Clapham	79
(Manitoba) Gerri Cooke	79
(Prince Edward Island) Kathy O'Rourke	79
(Saskatchewan) Colleen Zielke	78
(Quebec) Jessica Marchand	78

Skips	%
(Ontario) Marilyn Bodogh	79
(Saskatchewan) Sherry Scheirich	78
(Canada) Connie Laliberte	77
(Prince Edward Island) Susan McInnis	75
(Alberta) Cheryl Kullman	73
(Nova Scotia) Colleen Jones	73

== Awards ==
The all-star team and sportsmanship award winners were as follows.

=== All-Star Team ===
This was the final tournament in which only one all-star team was selected.

Position	Name	Team
Skip	Sherry Scheirich	Saskatchewan
Third	Kim Gellard	Ontario
Second	Tricia MacGregor	Prince Edward Island
Lead	Judy Pendergast	Alberta

=== Arline Wilson Award ===
The Scotties Tournament of Hearts Sportsmanship Award is presented to the curler who best embodies the spirit of curling at the Scotties Tournament of Hearts. The winner was selected in a vote by all players at the tournament.

Prior to 1998, the award was named after a notable individual in the curling community where the tournament was held that year. For this edition, the award was named after Arline Wilson, who was a member of the Northern Ontario team who won the 1991 Canadian Senior Women's Curling Championship team.

Name	Team	Position
Stephanie Marchand	Quebec	Skip

=== Ford Hot Shots ===
Starting with the 1995 tournament, Ford began a tradition of a skills competition preceding the round robin of the tournament. Each competitor had to perform a series of shots with each shot scoring between 0 and 5 points depending on where the stone came to rest. The winner of this edition of the event would win a two-year lease on a Mercury Mystique.

Winner	Runner-Up	Score
(Manitoba) Gerri Cooke	(Canada) Cathy Gauthier	26–14
