= Gellard =

Gellard is a surname. Notable people with the surname include:

- Kim Gellard (born 1974), Canadian curler
- Sam Gellard (born 1950), Trinidadian ice hockey player
