= Lisa Savage =

Canadian curler

- Curler

Team
- Curling club: St. Catharines CC, St. Catharines, ON

Curling career
- Member Association: Ontario
- Hearts: 2 (1996, 1997)
- World Championship: 1 (1996)
- Other appearances: World Junior Championships: 1 (1994)
Medal record
Curling
Representing Canada
World Championships
Gold medal – first place	1996 Hamilton
World Junior Championships
Gold medal – first place	1994 Sofia
Representing Ontario
Scotties Tournament of Hearts
Gold medal – first place	1996 Thunder Bay

Lisa Savage (born c. 1976) is a Canadian curler.

She is a 1996 World women's champion and 1996 Canadian women's champion.

== Personal life ==
Savage attended Markham District High School. She is the daughter of 1983 Brier and World Champion, Paul Savage.

== Teams and events ==
Season	Skip	Third	Second	Lead	Alternate	Coach	Events
1992–93	Kim Gellard	Corie Beveridge	Lisa Savage	Sandy Graham			CJCC 1993 (gold)
1993–94	Kim Gellard	Corie Beveridge	Lisa Savage	Sandy Graham	Heather Crockett		WJCC 1994 (gold)
1995–96	Marilyn Bodogh	Kim Gellard	Corie Beveridge	Jane Hooper Perroud	Lisa Savage		STOH 1996 (gold); WCC 1996 (gold)
1996–97	Marilyn Bodogh	Kim Gellard	Corie Beveridge	Jane Hooper Perroud	Lisa Savage	Mary Gellard	STOH 1997 (8th)
1998–99	Kim Gellard	Sherry Scheirich	Lisa Savage	Allison Ross			
