= Helene Jensen =

Danish curler

- Curler ♀

Team
- Curling club: Tårnby CC, Hvidovre CC, Hvidovre

Curling career
- Member Association: Denmark
- World Championship: 3 (1994, 1995, 1996)
- European Championship: 4 (1993, 1994, 1995, 1996)
Medal record
Curling
European Championships
Gold medal – first place	1994 Sundsvall
Danish Women's Championship
Gold medal – first place	1994
Gold medal – first place	1995
Gold medal – first place	1996

Helene Jensen is a Danish former curler.

She is a 1994 European champion.

Her sister Angelina Jensen was her teammate.

== Teams ==
Season	Skip	Third	Second	Lead	Alternate	Coach	Events
1989–90	June Simonsen	Dorthe Holm	Margit Pörtner	Helene Jensen			DJCC 1990 (gold)
1990–91	June Simonsen	Dorthe Holm	Angelina Jensen	Helene Jensen			DJCC 1991 (gold)
1990–91	Dorthe Holm (fourth)	June Simonsen (skip)	Margit Pörtner	Helene Jensen	Angelina Jensen		WJCC 1991 (6th)
1991–92	Angelina Jensen	Dorthe Holm	Margit Pörtner	Helene Jensen			DJCC 1992 (gold)
1991–92	Dorthe Holm	Margit Pörtner	Angelina Jensen	Helene Jensen	Nel-Britt Kristensen		WJCC 1992 (8th)
1992–93	Angelina Jensen	Dorthe Holm	Margit Pörtner	Helene Jensen			DJCC 1993 (gold)
1992–93	Dorthe Holm	Angelina Jensen	Margit Pörtner	Helene Jensen	Kamilla Schack		WJCC 1993 (bronze)
1993–94	Helena Blach	Angelina Jensen	Margit Pörtner	Charlotte Hedegaard	Helene Jensen		ECC 1993 (8th)
1993–94	Angelina Jensen	Dorthe Holm	Kamilla Schack	Helene Jensen	Charlotte Hedegaard		DJCC 1994 (gold); WJCC 1994 (bronze)
1993–94	Helena Blach	Angelina Jensen	Helene Jensen	Margit Pörtner	Charlotte Hedegaard		DWCC 1994 (gold)
1993–94	Helena Blach Lavrsen	Angelina Jensen	Margit Pörtner	Helene Jensen	Dorthe Holm		WCC 1994 (9th)
1994–95	Helena Blach Lavrsen	Dorthe Holm	Margit Pörtner	Helene Jensen	Lisa Richardson	Jane Bidstrup	ECC 1994 (gold)
1994–95	Kamilla Schack	Birgitte Knudsen	Margit Ziegler	Helene Jensen			DJCC 1995 (gold)
1994–95	Helena Blach Lavrsen	Dorthe Holm	Helene Jensen	Margit Pörtner	Lisa Richardson		DWCC 1995 (gold); WCC 1995 (5th)
1995–96	Helena Blach Lavrsen	Dorthe Holm	Helene Jensen	Margit Pörtner	Lisa Richardson		DWCC 1996 (gold)
1995–96	Dorthe Holm	Margit Pörtner	Helene Jensen	Lisa Richardson	Helena Blach Lavrsen	Frants Gufler (ECC)	ECC 1995 (5th); WCC 1996 (7th)
1996	Dorthe Holm	Margit Pörtner	Helene Jensen	Lisa Richardson	Helena Blach Lavrsen	Frants Gufler	ECC 1996 (7th)
