= 2025 Canadian Senior Curling Championships =

- Host city: Ottawa, Ontario
- Arena: Ottawa Hunt and Golf Club
- Dates: November 29 – December 6
- Men's winner: Saskatchewan
- Curling club: Nutana CC, Saskatoon
- Skip: Bruce Korte
- Third: Darrell McKee
- Second: Kory Kohuch
- Lead: Rory Golanowski
- Alternate: Arlen Hall
- Finalist: Ontario (Harris)
- Women's winner: Ontario
- Curling club: Barrie CC, Barrie
- Skip: Sherry Middaugh
- Third: Karri-Lee Grant
- Second: Melissa Foster
- Lead: Jane Hooper-Perroud
- Coach: Wayne Middaugh
- Finalist: Saskatchewan (Holland)

The 2025 Canadian Senior Curling Championships were held from November 29 to December 6 at the Ottawa Hunt and Golf Club in Ottawa, Ontario. The event is the Canadian national championship for 50-and over curlers, where the winning men's and women's teams, Saskatchewan's Bruce Korte and Ontario's Sherry Middaugh, will represent Canada at the 2026 World Senior Curling Championships.

== Men ==
=== Teams ===
The teams are listed as follows:

| Team | Skip | Third | Second | Lead | Alternate | Locale |
|---|---|---|---|---|---|---|
| Alberta | James Pahl | Mark Klinck | Kelly Mauthe | John Schmidt | Cory Wilson | Sherwood Park CC, Sherwood Park |
| British Columbia | Neil Dangerfield | Mike Wood | Darren Boden | Glen Allen | Andy Jarzebiak | Victoria CC, Victoria |
| Manitoba | Dave Boehmer | Dale Lott | Sean Bracken | George Hacking | Scott Szydlik | Petersfield CC, Petersfield |
| New Brunswick | James Grattan | Charlie Sullivan | Jason Vaughan | Paul Nason | | Thistle St. Andrews CC, Saint John |
| Newfoundland and Labrador | Keith Ryan | Mike Ryan | Barry Edwards | Dennis Langdon | | Carol CC, Labrador City |
| Northern Ontario | Al Belec | Al Harnden | Duncan Bell | Marc Barrette | | YNCU CC, Sault Ste. Marie |
| Northwest Territories | Greg Skauge | Tom Naugler | Brad Chorostkowski | Brad Patzer | | Yellowknife CC, Yellowknife |
| Nova Scotia | Alan O'Leary | Curt Palmer | Danny Christianson | Glenn Josephson | Steve Johnston | Bridgewater CC, Bridgewater |
| Nunavut | Peter Mackey | Jeff Nadeau | Greg Howard | Jamie Gauthier | | Iqaluit CC, Iqaluit |
| Ontario | Mike Harris | Scott Foster | Chad Allen | Jay Allen | Richard Hart | Brant CC, Brantford |
| Prince Edward Island | Eddie MacKenzie | Tyler Harris | Philip Gorveatt | Sean Ledgerwood | | Cornwall CC, Cornwall |
| Quebec | Robert Desjardins | François Gionest | Yannick Martel | René Dubois | Stewart Yaxley | CC Chicoutimi, Chicoutimi, CC Riverbend, Alma, CC Montréal Ouest, Montreal |
| Saskatchewan | Bruce Korte | Darrell McKee | Kory Kohuch | Rory Golanowski | Arlen Hall | Nutana CC, Saskatoon |
| Yukon | Robert Smallwood | Clint Able | Trent Derkatch | Bernie Adilman | | Whitehorse CC, Whitehorse |

=== Round robin standings ===
Final Round Robin Standings

Key
| Teams to Championship Pool |

| Pool A | Skip | W | L | W-L | LSD |
|---|---|---|---|---|---|
| Saskatchewan | Bruce Korte | 6 | 0 | – | 53.53 |
| Ontario | Mike Harris | 4 | 2 | 1–0 | 49.62 |
| New Brunswick | James Grattan | 4 | 2 | 0–1 | 46.29 |
| Newfoundland and Labrador | Keith Ryan | 3 | 3 | – | 40.77 |
| Alberta | James Pahl | 2 | 4 | 1–0 | 61.74 |
| Northwest Territories | Greg Skauge | 2 | 4 | 0–1 | 34.39 |
| Yukon | Robert Smallwood | 0 | 6 | – | 46.45 |

| Pool B | Skip | W | L | W-L | LSD |
|---|---|---|---|---|---|
| British Columbia | Neil Dangerfield | 5 | 1 | – | 33.40 |
| Quebec | Robert Desjardins | 4 | 2 | 1–0 | 49.25 |
| Manitoba | Dave Boehmer | 4 | 2 | 0–1 | 37.94 |
| Northern Ontario | Al Belec | 3 | 3 | – | 35.54 |
| Nova Scotia | Alan O'Leary | 2 | 4 | 1–0 | 32.75 |
| Prince Edward Island | Eddie MacKenzie | 2 | 4 | 0–1 | 37.55 |
| Nunavut | Peter Mackey | 1 | 5 | – | 88.87 |

=== Round robin results ===
All draws are listed in Eastern Standard Time (UTC−05:00).

==== Draw 1 ====
Saturday, November 29, 3:00 pm

| Sheet A | 1 | 2 | 3 | 4 | 5 | 6 | 7 | 8 | Final |
| New Brunswick (Grattan) | 0 | 1 | 1 | 0 | 1 | 0 | 0 | X | 3 |
| Saskatchewan (Korte) | 1 | 0 | 0 | 2 | 0 | 2 | 1 | X | 6 |

| Sheet B | 1 | 2 | 3 | 4 | 5 | 6 | 7 | 8 | Final |
| Manitoba (Boehmer) | 0 | 2 | 0 | 0 | 0 | 1 | 0 | 2 | 5 |
| Prince Edward Island (MacKenzie) | 1 | 0 | 0 | 1 | 1 | 0 | 1 | 0 | 4 |

| Sheet C | 1 | 2 | 3 | 4 | 5 | 6 | 7 | 8 | Final |
| Northwest Territories (Skauge) | 1 | 0 | 0 | 2 | 0 | 0 | 0 | X | 3 |
| Newfoundland and Labrador (Ryan) | 0 | 2 | 1 | 0 | 4 | 1 | 3 | X | 11 |

| Sheet D | 1 | 2 | 3 | 4 | 5 | 6 | 7 | 8 | 9 | Final |
| Quebec (Desjardins) | 0 | 1 | 1 | 0 | 0 | 1 | 0 | 1 | 0 | 4 |
| Northern Ontario (Belec) | 0 | 0 | 0 | 2 | 1 | 0 | 1 | 0 | 1 | 5 |

| Sheet E | 1 | 2 | 3 | 4 | 5 | 6 | 7 | 8 | Final |
| Yukon (Smallwood) | 1 | 0 | 1 | 0 | 1 | 0 | X | X | 3 |
| Ontario (Harris) | 0 | 5 | 0 | 3 | 0 | 3 | X | X | 11 |

| Sheet F | 1 | 2 | 3 | 4 | 5 | 6 | 7 | 8 | Final |
| Nunavut (Mackey) | 2 | 0 | 0 | 1 | 0 | 1 | 1 | X | 5 |
| British Columbia (Dangerfield) | 0 | 3 | 3 | 0 | 2 | 0 | 0 | X | 8 |

==== Draw 3 ====
Sunday, November 30, 10:00 am

| Sheet A | 1 | 2 | 3 | 4 | 5 | 6 | 7 | 8 | Final |
| Prince Edward Island (MacKenzie) | 0 | 0 | 1 | 1 | 2 | 0 | 4 | 0 | 8 |
| Nova Scotia (O'Leary) | 1 | 4 | 0 | 0 | 0 | 2 | 0 | 2 | 9 |

| Sheet B | 1 | 2 | 3 | 4 | 5 | 6 | 7 | 8 | Final |
| Alberta (Pahl) | 0 | 0 | 1 | 1 | 1 | 1 | 0 | 0 | 4 |
| New Brunswick (Grattan) | 2 | 2 | 0 | 0 | 0 | 0 | 1 | 1 | 6 |

| Sheet C | 1 | 2 | 3 | 4 | 5 | 6 | 7 | 8 | Final |
| British Columbia (Dangerfield) | 0 | 3 | 2 | 0 | 1 | 0 | 2 | 0 | 8 |
| Northern Ontario (Belec) | 2 | 0 | 0 | 2 | 0 | 1 | 0 | 1 | 6 |

| Sheet D | 1 | 2 | 3 | 4 | 5 | 6 | 7 | 8 | Final |
| Newfoundland and Labrador (Ryan) | 1 | 0 | 1 | 0 | 0 | 2 | 0 | X | 4 |
| Ontario (Harris) | 0 | 3 | 0 | 3 | 1 | 0 | 1 | X | 8 |

| Sheet E | 1 | 2 | 3 | 4 | 5 | 6 | 7 | 8 | Final |
| Nunavut (Mackey) | 0 | 0 | 0 | 1 | 0 | 0 | 2 | X | 3 |
| Quebec (Desjardins) | 0 | 1 | 2 | 0 | 1 | 2 | 0 | X | 6 |

| Sheet F | 1 | 2 | 3 | 4 | 5 | 6 | 7 | 8 | Final |
| Northwest Territories (Skauge) | 0 | 1 | 3 | 2 | 0 | 1 | 0 | 0 | 7 |
| Yukon (Smallwood) | 1 | 0 | 0 | 0 | 2 | 0 | 1 | 2 | 6 |

==== Draw 5 ====
Sunday, November 30, 6:00 pm

| Sheet A | 1 | 2 | 3 | 4 | 5 | 6 | 7 | 8 | Final |
| Northern Ontario (Belec) | 1 | 0 | 0 | 4 | 1 | 0 | 1 | X | 7 |
| Manitoba (Boehmer) | 0 | 6 | 2 | 0 | 0 | 4 | 0 | X | 12 |

| Sheet B | 1 | 2 | 3 | 4 | 5 | 6 | 7 | 8 | Final |
| Saskatchewan (Korte) | 3 | 0 | 2 | 4 | 0 | 3 | X | X | 12 |
| Northwest Territories (Skauge) | 0 | 1 | 0 | 0 | 1 | 0 | X | X | 2 |

| Sheet C | 1 | 2 | 3 | 4 | 5 | 6 | 7 | 8 | Final |
| Nova Scotia (O'Leary) | 1 | 0 | 0 | 0 | 0 | 1 | 2 | 0 | 4 |
| Nunavut (Mackey) | 0 | 1 | 3 | 1 | 0 | 0 | 0 | 1 | 6 |

| Sheet D | 1 | 2 | 3 | 4 | 5 | 6 | 7 | 8 | Final |
| New Brunswick (Grattan) | 3 | 2 | 1 | 1 | 5 | 0 | X | X | 12 |
| Yukon (Smallwood) | 0 | 0 | 0 | 0 | 0 | 1 | X | X | 1 |

| Sheet E | 1 | 2 | 3 | 4 | 5 | 6 | 7 | 8 | 9 | Final |
| British Columbia (Dangerfield) | 0 | 1 | 0 | 1 | 2 | 0 | 1 | 2 | 0 | 7 |
| Prince Edward Island (MacKenzie) | 2 | 0 | 2 | 0 | 0 | 3 | 0 | 0 | 2 | 9 |

| Sheet F | 1 | 2 | 3 | 4 | 5 | 6 | 7 | 8 | Final |
| Ontario (Harris) | 1 | 0 | 1 | 0 | 1 | 2 | 0 | 4 | 9 |
| Alberta (Pahl) | 0 | 3 | 0 | 2 | 0 | 0 | 2 | 0 | 7 |

==== Draw 7 ====
Monday, December 1, 2:00 pm

| Sheet A | 1 | 2 | 3 | 4 | 5 | 6 | 7 | 8 | Final |
| Newfoundland and Labrador (Ryan) | 1 | 0 | 0 | 0 | 0 | 1 | 0 | X | 2 |
| New Brunswick (Grattan) | 0 | 1 | 2 | 1 | 1 | 0 | 3 | X | 8 |

| Sheet B | 1 | 2 | 3 | 4 | 5 | 6 | 7 | 8 | Final |
| Nunavut (Mackey) | 0 | 0 | 0 | 1 | 0 | 0 | X | X | 1 |
| Northern Ontario (Belec) | 5 | 1 | 1 | 0 | 4 | 1 | X | X | 12 |

| Sheet C | 1 | 2 | 3 | 4 | 5 | 6 | 7 | 8 | Final |
| Alberta (Pahl) | 2 | 1 | 0 | 2 | 0 | 2 | 0 | 1 | 8 |
| Northwest Territories (Skauge) | 0 | 0 | 2 | 0 | 1 | 0 | 1 | 0 | 4 |

| Sheet D | 1 | 2 | 3 | 4 | 5 | 6 | 7 | 8 | 9 | Final |
| Manitoba (Boehmer) | 1 | 0 | 1 | 0 | 2 | 2 | 0 | 0 | 0 | 6 |
| British Columbia (Dangerfield) | 0 | 1 | 0 | 3 | 0 | 0 | 1 | 1 | 1 | 7 |

| Sheet E | 1 | 2 | 3 | 4 | 5 | 6 | 7 | 8 | Final |
| Ontario (Harris) | 0 | 1 | 0 | 2 | 0 | 2 | 0 | X | 5 |
| Saskatchewan (Korte) | 1 | 0 | 1 | 0 | 5 | 0 | 2 | X | 9 |

| Sheet F | 1 | 2 | 3 | 4 | 5 | 6 | 7 | 8 | Final |
| Quebec (Desjardins) | 1 | 1 | 0 | 2 | 2 | 5 | X | X | 11 |
| Nova Scotia (O'Leary) | 0 | 0 | 3 | 0 | 0 | 0 | X | X | 3 |

==== Draw 9 ====
Tuesday, December 2, 10:00 am

| Sheet A | 1 | 2 | 3 | 4 | 5 | 6 | 7 | 8 | Final |
| Northwest Territories (Skauge) | 2 | 0 | 2 | 0 | 1 | 0 | 3 | X | 8 |
| Ontario (Harris) | 0 | 2 | 0 | 1 | 0 | 1 | 0 | X | 4 |

| Sheet B | 1 | 2 | 3 | 4 | 5 | 6 | 7 | 8 | 9 | Final |
| Prince Edward Island (MacKenzie) | 2 | 0 | 0 | 1 | 0 | 1 | 1 | 1 | 0 | 6 |
| Quebec (Desjardins) | 0 | 3 | 0 | 0 | 3 | 0 | 0 | 0 | 1 | 7 |

| Sheet C | 1 | 2 | 3 | 4 | 5 | 6 | 7 | 8 | Final |
| Yukon (Smallwood) | 0 | 1 | 0 | 0 | 0 | 0 | X | X | 1 |
| Saskatchewan (Korte) | 1 | 0 | 1 | 2 | 2 | 2 | X | X | 8 |

| Sheet D | 1 | 2 | 3 | 4 | 5 | 6 | 7 | 8 | Final |
| Northern Ontario (Belec) | 0 | 2 | 0 | 1 | 0 | 0 | 2 | 0 | 5 |
| Nova Scotia (O'Leary) | 2 | 0 | 1 | 0 | 0 | 2 | 0 | 1 | 6 |

| Sheet E | 1 | 2 | 3 | 4 | 5 | 6 | 7 | 8 | Final |
| Alberta (Pahl) | 0 | 0 | 1 | 0 | 1 | 2 | 0 | 0 | 4 |
| Newfoundland and Labrador (Ryan) | 0 | 2 | 0 | 3 | 0 | 0 | 1 | 1 | 7 |

| Sheet F | 1 | 2 | 3 | 4 | 5 | 6 | 7 | 8 | Final |
| Manitoba (Boehmer) | 0 | 3 | 2 | 0 | 1 | 1 | 0 | X | 7 |
| Nunavut (Mackey) | 2 | 0 | 0 | 1 | 0 | 0 | 1 | X | 4 |

==== Draw 11 ====
Tuesday, December 2, 6:00 pm

| Sheet A | 1 | 2 | 3 | 4 | 5 | 6 | 7 | 8 | Final |
| Yukon (Smallwood) | 2 | 0 | 0 | 0 | 0 | 1 | 1 | 1 | 5 |
| Alberta (Pahl) | 0 | 1 | 2 | 2 | 1 | 0 | 0 | 0 | 6 |

| Sheet B | 1 | 2 | 3 | 4 | 5 | 6 | 7 | 8 | 9 | Final |
| Nova Scotia (O'Leary) | 0 | 2 | 0 | 2 | 0 | 1 | 1 | 0 | 0 | 6 |
| British Columbia (Dangerfield) | 1 | 0 | 2 | 0 | 1 | 0 | 0 | 2 | 1 | 7 |

| Sheet C | 1 | 2 | 3 | 4 | 5 | 6 | 7 | 8 | Final |
| Quebec (Desjardins) | 0 | 2 | 0 | 2 | 1 | 0 | 3 | X | 8 |
| Manitoba (Boehmer) | 0 | 0 | 1 | 0 | 0 | 1 | 0 | X | 2 |

| Sheet D | 1 | 2 | 3 | 4 | 5 | 6 | 7 | 8 | Final |
| Prince Edward Island (MacKenzie) | 3 | 0 | 0 | 2 | 0 | 0 | 3 | X | 8 |
| Nunavut (Mackey) | 0 | 1 | 1 | 0 | 1 | 1 | 0 | X | 4 |

| Sheet E | 1 | 2 | 3 | 4 | 5 | 6 | 7 | 8 | Final |
| New Brunswick (Grattan) | 0 | 2 | 0 | 0 | 0 | 2 | 0 | 1 | 5 |
| Northwest Territories (Skauge) | 0 | 0 | 0 | 0 | 2 | 0 | 2 | 0 | 4 |

| Sheet F | 1 | 2 | 3 | 4 | 5 | 6 | 7 | 8 | Final |
| Saskatchewan (Korte) | 0 | 0 | 0 | 2 | 0 | 1 | 0 | 3 | 6 |
| Newfoundland and Labrador (Ryan) | 0 | 1 | 1 | 0 | 1 | 0 | 1 | 0 | 4 |

==== Draw 13 ====
Wednesday, December 3, 2:00 pm

| Sheet A | 1 | 2 | 3 | 4 | 5 | 6 | 7 | 8 | Final |
| British Columbia (Dangerfield) | 2 | 0 | 2 | 0 | 2 | 0 | 3 | X | 9 |
| Quebec (Desjardins) | 0 | 1 | 0 | 1 | 0 | 1 | 0 | X | 3 |

| Sheet B | 1 | 2 | 3 | 4 | 5 | 6 | 7 | 8 | Final |
| Newfoundland and Labrador (Ryan) | 0 | 4 | 2 | 0 | 1 | 0 | 2 | X | 9 |
| Yukon (Smallwood) | 1 | 0 | 0 | 1 | 0 | 2 | 0 | X | 4 |

| Sheet C | 1 | 2 | 3 | 4 | 5 | 6 | 7 | 8 | Final |
| Ontario (Harris) | 1 | 0 | 4 | 0 | 2 | 3 | X | X | 10 |
| New Brunswick (Grattan) | 0 | 2 | 0 | 1 | 0 | 0 | X | X | 3 |

| Sheet D | 1 | 2 | 3 | 4 | 5 | 6 | 7 | 8 | Final |
| Saskatchewan (Korte) | 0 | 3 | 1 | 0 | 3 | 1 | X | X | 8 |
| Alberta (Pahl) | 1 | 0 | 0 | 1 | 0 | 0 | X | X | 2 |

| Sheet E | 1 | 2 | 3 | 4 | 5 | 6 | 7 | 8 | Final |
| Nova Scotia (O'Leary) | 0 | 2 | 0 | 2 | 1 | 0 | 1 | 0 | 6 |
| Manitoba (Boehmer) | 1 | 0 | 1 | 0 | 0 | 4 | 0 | 1 | 7 |

| Sheet F | 1 | 2 | 3 | 4 | 5 | 6 | 7 | 8 | Final |
| Northern Ontario (Belec) | 0 | 1 | 0 | 4 | X | X | X | X | 5 |
| Prince Edward Island (MacKenzie) | 2 | 0 | 1 | 0 | X | X | X | X | 3 |

=== Seeding pool ===
==== Standings ====
Final Seeding Pool Standings

| Team | Skip | W | L | W-L | LSD |
|---|---|---|---|---|---|
| Northwest Territories | Greg Skauge | 4 | 4 | – | 39.34 |
| Prince Edward Island | Eddie MacKenzie | 3 | 5 | 1–0 | 39.80 |
| Alberta | James Pahl | 3 | 5 | 0–1 | 48.59 |
| Yukon | Robert Smallwood | 2 | 6 | 1–0 | 47.25 |
| Nova Scotia | Alan O'Leary | 2 | 6 | 0–1 | 39.33 |
| Nunavut | Peter Mackey | 1 | 7 | – | 109.25 |

==== Results ====
===== Draw 15 =====
Thursday, December 4, 8:30 am

| Sheet F | 1 | 2 | 3 | 4 | 5 | 6 | 7 | 8 | Final |
| Northwest Territories (Skauge) | 2 | 0 | 1 | 3 | 0 | 1 | 0 | 1 | 8 |
| Prince Edward Island (MacKenzie) | 0 | 2 | 0 | 0 | 2 | 0 | 1 | 0 | 5 |

===== Draw 16 =====
Thursday, December 4, 12:30 pm

| Sheet A | 1 | 2 | 3 | 4 | 5 | 6 | 7 | 8 | Final |
| Alberta (Pahl) | 3 | 0 | 4 | 4 | 0 | 0 | X | X | 11 |
| Nova Scotia (O'Leary) | 0 | 1 | 0 | 0 | 1 | 0 | X | X | 2 |

===== Draw 17 =====
Thursday, December 4, 4:30 pm

| Sheet F | 1 | 2 | 3 | 4 | 5 | 6 | 7 | 8 | Final |
| Yukon (Smallwood) | 3 | 2 | 1 | 2 | 0 | 1 | X | X | 9 |
| Nunavut (Mackey) | 0 | 0 | 0 | 0 | 1 | 0 | X | X | 1 |

===== Draw 18 =====
Thursday, December 4, 8:30 pm

| Sheet A | 1 | 2 | 3 | 4 | 5 | 6 | 7 | 8 | Final |
| Nova Scotia (O'Leary) | 0 | 2 | 0 | 0 | 2 | 0 | 1 | X | 5 |
| Yukon (Smallwood) | 2 | 0 | 3 | 2 | 0 | 3 | 0 | X | 10 |

===== Draw 21 =====
Friday, December 5, 4:30 pm

| Sheet B | 1 | 2 | 3 | 4 | 5 | 6 | 7 | 8 | Final |
| Nunavut (Mackey) | 0 | 0 | 0 | 0 | 0 | 0 | X | X | 0 |
| Northwest Territories (Skauge) | 2 | 1 | 3 | 4 | 3 | 2 | X | X | 15 |

===== Draw 23 =====
Saturday, December 6, 10:00 am

| Sheet A | 1 | 2 | 3 | 4 | 5 | 6 | 7 | 8 | 9 | Final |
| Alberta (Pahl) | 2 | 0 | 1 | 0 | 0 | 1 | 1 | 0 | 0 | 5 |
| Prince Edward Island (MacKenzie) | 0 | 1 | 0 | 3 | 0 | 0 | 0 | 1 | 1 | 6 |

=== Championship pool ===
==== Standings ====
Final Championship Pool Standings

Key
| Teams to Playoffs |

| Team | Skip | W | L | W-L | LSD |
|---|---|---|---|---|---|
| Saskatchewan | Bruce Korte | 9 | 1 | – | 48.01 |
| Ontario | Mike Harris | 8 | 2 | 1–0 | 50.79 |
| New Brunswick | James Grattan | 8 | 2 | 0–1 | 45.55 |
| British Columbia | Neil Dangerfield | 7 | 3 | – | 37.76 |
| Quebec | Robert Desjardins | 5 | 5 | – | 43.60 |
| Manitoba | Dave Boehmer | 4 | 6 | 1–1 | 44.15 |
| Newfoundland and Labrador | Keith Ryan | 4 | 6 | 1–1 | 57.13 |
| Northern Ontario | Al Belec | 4 | 6 | 1–1 | 62.62 |

==== Results ====
===== Draw 16 =====
Thursday, December 4, 12:30 pm

| Sheet B | 1 | 2 | 3 | 4 | 5 | 6 | 7 | 8 | Final |
| Northern Ontario (Belec) | 0 | 0 | 1 | 0 | 0 | 0 | X | X | 1 |
| Saskatchewan (Korte) | 2 | 1 | 0 | 3 | 2 | 1 | X | X | 9 |

| Sheet C | 1 | 2 | 3 | 4 | 5 | 6 | 7 | 8 | Final |
| Ontario (Harris) | 0 | 2 | 0 | 3 | 0 | 1 | 0 | X | 6 |
| British Columbia (Dangerfield) | 0 | 0 | 1 | 0 | 2 | 0 | 1 | X | 4 |

| Sheet D | 1 | 2 | 3 | 4 | 5 | 6 | 7 | 8 | Final |
| New Brunswick (Grattan) | 0 | 0 | 2 | 0 | 1 | 0 | 5 | X | 8 |
| Quebec (Desjardins) | 0 | 2 | 0 | 1 | 0 | 2 | 0 | X | 5 |

| Sheet E | 1 | 2 | 3 | 4 | 5 | 6 | 7 | 8 | Final |
| Manitoba (Boehmer) | 1 | 0 | 1 | 0 | 2 | 0 | 1 | 0 | 5 |
| Newfoundland and Labrador (Ryan) | 0 | 3 | 0 | 2 | 0 | 1 | 0 | 4 | 10 |

===== Draw 18 =====
Thursday, December 4, 8:30 pm

| Sheet B | 1 | 2 | 3 | 4 | 5 | 6 | 7 | 8 | Final |
| Newfoundland and Labrador (Ryan) | 0 | 0 | 0 | 2 | 0 | 2 | 0 | X | 4 |
| Quebec (Desjardins) | 0 | 1 | 2 | 0 | 2 | 0 | 3 | X | 8 |

| Sheet C | 1 | 2 | 3 | 4 | 5 | 6 | 7 | 8 | Final |
| Saskatchewan (Korte) | 0 | 3 | 1 | 0 | 4 | 0 | 3 | X | 11 |
| Manitoba (Boehmer) | 4 | 0 | 0 | 1 | 0 | 2 | 0 | X | 7 |

| Sheet D | 1 | 2 | 3 | 4 | 5 | 6 | 7 | 8 | Final |
| Northern Ontario (Belec) | 0 | 0 | 1 | 0 | 1 | 0 | X | X | 2 |
| Ontario (Harris) | 3 | 2 | 0 | 3 | 0 | 3 | X | X | 11 |

| Sheet E | 1 | 2 | 3 | 4 | 5 | 6 | 7 | 8 | Final |
| British Columbia (Dangerfield) | 1 | 0 | 1 | 0 | 1 | 0 | 1 | 0 | 4 |
| New Brunswick (Grattan) | 0 | 2 | 0 | 2 | 0 | 1 | 0 | 2 | 7 |

===== Draw 20 =====
Friday, December 5, 12:30 pm

| Sheet A | 1 | 2 | 3 | 4 | 5 | 6 | 7 | 8 | Final |
| New Brunswick (Grattan) | 1 | 0 | 1 | 0 | 0 | 3 | 1 | 2 | 8 |
| Northern Ontario (Belec) | 0 | 1 | 0 | 3 | 1 | 0 | 0 | 0 | 5 |

| Sheet B | 1 | 2 | 3 | 4 | 5 | 6 | 7 | 8 | Final |
| Ontario (Harris) | 2 | 1 | 0 | 2 | 1 | 0 | 1 | 1 | 8 |
| Manitoba (Boehmer) | 0 | 0 | 3 | 0 | 0 | 2 | 0 | 0 | 5 |

| Sheet E | 1 | 2 | 3 | 4 | 5 | 6 | 7 | 8 | Final |
| Quebec (Desjardins) | 0 | 0 | 0 | 0 | 0 | 0 | 3 | 0 | 3 |
| Saskatchewan (Korte) | 0 | 0 | 0 | 1 | 1 | 2 | 0 | 2 | 6 |

| Sheet F | 1 | 2 | 3 | 4 | 5 | 6 | 7 | 8 | 9 | Final |
| British Columbia (Dangerfield) | 0 | 0 | 1 | 0 | 3 | 0 | 3 | 0 | 3 | 10 |
| Newfoundland and Labrador (Ryan) | 0 | 3 | 0 | 1 | 0 | 1 | 0 | 2 | 0 | 7 |

===== Draw 22 =====
Friday, December 5, 8:30 pm

| Sheet A | 1 | 2 | 3 | 4 | 5 | 6 | 7 | 8 | Final |
| Quebec (Desjardins) | 0 | 2 | 0 | 1 | 0 | 1 | 0 | X | 4 |
| Ontario (Harris) | 2 | 0 | 1 | 0 | 2 | 0 | 1 | X | 6 |

| Sheet C | 1 | 2 | 3 | 4 | 5 | 6 | 7 | 8 | Final |
| Newfoundland and Labrador (Ryan) | 2 | 0 | 0 | 2 | 0 | 0 | 2 | 0 | 6 |
| Northern Ontario (Belec) | 0 | 2 | 1 | 0 | 3 | 0 | 0 | 1 | 7 |

| Sheet D | 1 | 2 | 3 | 4 | 5 | 6 | 7 | 8 | Final |
| Saskatchewan (Korte) | 0 | 0 | 1 | 0 | 0 | 1 | 0 | 1 | 3 |
| British Columbia (Dangerfield) | 1 | 0 | 0 | 1 | 1 | 0 | 2 | 0 | 5 |

| Sheet F | 1 | 2 | 3 | 4 | 5 | 6 | 7 | 8 | Final |
| Manitoba (Boehmer) | 2 | 0 | 0 | 0 | 1 | 0 | 1 | 1 | 5 |
| New Brunswick (Grattan) | 0 | 1 | 4 | 0 | 0 | 1 | 0 | 0 | 6 |

=== Playoffs ===
Semifinals
1 | Saskatchewan | 6
4 | British Columbia | 3
2 | Ontario | 5
3 | New Brunswick | 4

Final
1 | Saskatchewan | 8
2 | Ontario | 4
Bronze Medal Game
4 | British Columbia | 4
3 | New Brunswick | 7

==== Semifinals ====
Saturday, December 6, 10:00 am

| Sheet B | 1 | 2 | 3 | 4 | 5 | 6 | 7 | 8 | 9 | Final |
| Ontario (Harris) | 1 | 0 | 0 | 0 | 1 | 0 | 2 | 0 | 1 | 5 |
| New Brunswick (Grattan) | 0 | 0 | 0 | 1 | 0 | 2 | 0 | 1 | 0 | 4 |

| Sheet C | 1 | 2 | 3 | 4 | 5 | 6 | 7 | 8 | Final |
| Saskatchewan (Korte) | 0 | 2 | 0 | 3 | 0 | 1 | 0 | X | 6 |
| British Columbia (Dangerfield) | 0 | 0 | 1 | 0 | 1 | 0 | 1 | X | 3 |

==== Bronze medal game ====
Saturday, December 6, 3:00 pm

| Sheet E | 1 | 2 | 3 | 4 | 5 | 6 | 7 | 8 | Final |
| New Brunswick (Grattan) | 1 | 0 | 2 | 2 | 0 | 2 | 0 | X | 7 |
| British Columbia (Dangerfield) | 0 | 2 | 0 | 0 | 1 | 0 | 1 | X | 4 |

==== Final ====
Saturday, December 6, 3:00 pm

| Sheet D | 1 | 2 | 3 | 4 | 5 | 6 | 7 | 8 | Final |
| Ontario (Harris) | 0 | 1 | 0 | 0 | 2 | 1 | 0 | X | 4 |
| Saskatchewan (Korte) | 2 | 0 | 1 | 3 | 0 | 0 | 2 | X | 8 |

=== Men's Final Standings ===
| Place | Team |
|---|---|
| 1st place, gold medalist(s) | Saskatchewan |
| 2nd place, silver medalist(s) | Ontario |
| 3rd place, bronze medalist(s) | New Brunswick |
| 4 | British Columbia |
| 5 | Quebec |
| 6 | Manitoba |
| 7 | Newfoundland and Labrador |
| 8 | Northern Ontario |

| Place | Team |
|---|---|
| 9 | Northwest Territories |
| 10 | Prince Edward Island |
| 11 | Alberta |
| 12 | Yukon |
| 13 | Nova Scotia |
| 14 | Nunavut |

== Women ==
=== Teams ===
The teams are listed as follows:

| Team | Skip | Third | Second | Lead | Alternate | Locale |
|---|---|---|---|---|---|---|
| Alberta | Delia DeJong | Glenys Bakker | Allison Earl | Adele Williamson | Bev Buckley | Grande Prairie CC, Grande Prairie |
| British Columbia | Shiella Cowan | Jody Maskiewich | Victoria Murphy | Sandra Comadina | | Golden Ears WC, Maple Ridge; Royal City CC, New Westminster |
| Manitoba | Marlene Lang | Pamela Kok | Jackie Hendrickson | Patti Ulrich | Brenda Michel | St. Vital CC, Winnipeg |
| New Brunswick | Shelly Graham | Michelle Majeau | Robyn Witherell | Shelley Murray | | Capital Winter Club, Fredericton |
| Newfoundland and Labrador | Jody Saunders | Carolyn Walters | Colette Mansfield | Marie Guzzwell | | St. John's CC, St. John's |
| Northern Ontario | Valerie MacInnes | Carole Horton | Rosanna Furletti | Kim Armstrong | | McIntyre CC, Timmins |
| Northwest Territories | Sharon Cormier | Cheryl Tordoff | Marta Moir | Kelly Kaylo | | Yellowknife CC, Yellowknife |
| Nova Scotia | Andrea Saulnier | Jill Alcoe-Holland | Karen Alcoe-Guest | Kim Garby | | Curl Kentville, Kentville |
| Nunavut | Geneva Chislett | Denise Hutchings | Robyn Mackey | Lisa Kirk | | Iqaluit CC, Iqaluit |
| Ontario | Sherry Middaugh | Karri-Lee Grant | Melissa Foster | Jane Hooper-Perroud | | Barrie CC, Barrie |
| Prince Edward Island | Shelly Bradley (Fourth) | Kathy O'Rourke | Susan McInnis (Skip) | Tricia MacGregor | | Cornwall CC, Cornwall |
| Quebec | Nathalie Gagnon | Isabelle Néron | Ginette Simard | Karine Tremblay | Cyntia Plouffe | CC Chicoutimi, Chicoutimi, CC Riverbend, Alma, CC Buckingham, Gatineau |
| Saskatchewan | Amber Holland | Jill Shumay | Sherri Singler | Trenna Derdall | | Sutherland CC, Saskatoon |
| Yukon | Rhonda Horte | Sandra Mikkelsen | Helen Strong | Corinne Delaire | | Whitehorse CC, Whitehorse |

=== Round robin standings ===
Final Round Robin Standings

Key
| Teams to Championship Pool |

| Pool A | Skip | W | L | W-L | LSD |
|---|---|---|---|---|---|
| Ontario | Sherry Middaugh | 6 | 0 | – | 60.53 |
| Nova Scotia | Andrea Saulnier | 5 | 1 | – | 80.06 |
| New Brunswick | Shelly Graham | 3 | 3 | 1–0 | 97.14 |
| Manitoba | Marlene Lang | 3 | 3 | 0–1 | 61.51 |
| Northwest Territories | Sharon Cormier | 2 | 4 | – | 42.85 |
| Newfoundland and Labrador | Jody Saunders | 1 | 5 | 1–0 | 96.28 |
| Quebec | Nathalie Gagnon | 1 | 5 | 0–1 | 73.87 |

| Pool B | Skip | W | L | W-L | LSD |
|---|---|---|---|---|---|
| British Columbia | Shiella Cowan | 6 | 0 | – | 58.89 |
| Saskatchewan | Amber Holland | 5 | 1 | – | 39.60 |
| Alberta | Delia DeJong | 4 | 2 | – | 66.95 |
| Yukon | Rhonda Horte | 3 | 3 | – | 85.86 |
| Prince Edward Island | Susan McInnis | 2 | 4 | – | 97.66 |
| Northern Ontario | Valerie MacInnes | 1 | 5 | – | 137.56 |
| Nunavut | Geneva Chislett | 0 | 6 | – | 121.13 |

=== Round robin results ===
All draws are listed in Eastern Standard Time (UTC−05:00).

==== Draw 2 ====
Saturday, November 29, 8:30 pm

| Sheet A | 1 | 2 | 3 | 4 | 5 | 6 | 7 | 8 | Final |
| Ontario (Middaugh) | 3 | 0 | 2 | 0 | 2 | 0 | 4 | X | 11 |
| New Brunswick (Graham) | 0 | 2 | 0 | 1 | 0 | 1 | 0 | X | 4 |

| Sheet B | 1 | 2 | 3 | 4 | 5 | 6 | 7 | 8 | Final |
| Nunavut (Chislett) | 0 | 0 | 0 | 2 | 0 | 0 | 0 | X | 2 |
| Saskatchewan (Holland) | 0 | 2 | 2 | 0 | 1 | 2 | 1 | X | 8 |

| Sheet C | 1 | 2 | 3 | 4 | 5 | 6 | 7 | 8 | Final |
| Manitoba (Lang) | 2 | 0 | 2 | 0 | 2 | 2 | 2 | X | 10 |
| Northwest Territories (Cormier) | 0 | 2 | 0 | 1 | 0 | 0 | 0 | X | 3 |

| Sheet D | 1 | 2 | 3 | 4 | 5 | 6 | 7 | 8 | Final |
| British Columbia (Cowan) | 1 | 0 | 0 | 2 | 0 | 0 | 1 | 1 | 5 |
| Alberta (DeJong) | 0 | 1 | 0 | 0 | 1 | 0 | 0 | 0 | 2 |

| Sheet E | 1 | 2 | 3 | 4 | 5 | 6 | 7 | 8 | Final |
| Nova Scotia (Saulnier) | 0 | 1 | 0 | 3 | 0 | 3 | 1 | X | 8 |
| Quebec (Gagnon) | 0 | 0 | 2 | 0 | 2 | 0 | 0 | X | 4 |

| Sheet F | 1 | 2 | 3 | 4 | 5 | 6 | 7 | 8 | Final |
| Northern Ontario (MacInnes) | 0 | 1 | 1 | 0 | 0 | 0 | X | X | 2 |
| Prince Edward Island (McInnis) | 2 | 0 | 0 | 2 | 5 | 3 | X | X | 12 |

==== Draw 4 ====
Sunday, November 30, 2:00 pm

| Sheet A | 1 | 2 | 3 | 4 | 5 | 6 | 7 | 8 | Final |
| Saskatchewan (Holland) | 0 | 2 | 1 | 0 | 1 | 0 | 0 | 1 | 5 |
| Yukon (Horte) | 1 | 0 | 0 | 1 | 0 | 1 | 1 | 0 | 4 |

| Sheet B | 1 | 2 | 3 | 4 | 5 | 6 | 7 | 8 | Final |
| Newfoundland and Labrador (Saunders) | 1 | 0 | 1 | 0 | 0 | 1 | 1 | X | 4 |
| Ontario (Middaugh) | 0 | 6 | 0 | 1 | 1 | 0 | 0 | X | 8 |

| Sheet C | 1 | 2 | 3 | 4 | 5 | 6 | 7 | 8 | Final |
| Prince Edward Island (McInnis) | 1 | 0 | 3 | 0 | 0 | 1 | 0 | 2 | 7 |
| Alberta (DeJong) | 0 | 2 | 0 | 2 | 1 | 0 | 3 | 0 | 8 |

| Sheet D | 1 | 2 | 3 | 4 | 5 | 6 | 7 | 8 | Final |
| Northwest Territories (Cormier) | 1 | 2 | 1 | 0 | 1 | 4 | X | X | 9 |
| Quebec (Gagnon) | 0 | 0 | 0 | 1 | 0 | 0 | X | X | 1 |

| Sheet E | 1 | 2 | 3 | 4 | 5 | 6 | 7 | 8 | Final |
| Northern Ontario (MacInnes) | 0 | 1 | 1 | 0 | 0 | 0 | 0 | X | 2 |
| British Columbia (Cowan) | 1 | 0 | 0 | 1 | 3 | 1 | 1 | X | 7 |

| Sheet F | 1 | 2 | 3 | 4 | 5 | 6 | 7 | 8 | Final |
| Manitoba (Lang) | 0 | 0 | 1 | 0 | 0 | 2 | 0 | X | 3 |
| Nova Scotia (Saulnier) | 0 | 3 | 0 | 2 | 1 | 0 | 2 | X | 8 |

==== Draw 6 ====
Monday, December 1, 10:00 am

| Sheet A | 1 | 2 | 3 | 4 | 5 | 6 | 7 | 8 | Final |
| Alberta (DeJong) | 4 | 1 | 1 | 1 | 4 | 2 | X | X | 13 |
| Nunavut (Chislett) | 0 | 0 | 0 | 0 | 0 | 0 | X | X | 0 |

| Sheet B | 1 | 2 | 3 | 4 | 5 | 6 | 7 | 8 | Final |
| New Brunswick (Graham) | 0 | 1 | 0 | 0 | 1 | 1 | 0 | 3 | 6 |
| Manitoba (Lang) | 0 | 0 | 2 | 1 | 0 | 0 | 2 | 0 | 5 |

| Sheet C | 1 | 2 | 3 | 4 | 5 | 6 | 7 | 8 | Final |
| Yukon (Horte) | 5 | 0 | 1 | 0 | 1 | 2 | X | X | 9 |
| Northern Ontario (MacInnes) | 0 | 1 | 0 | 1 | 0 | 0 | X | X | 2 |

| Sheet D | 1 | 2 | 3 | 4 | 5 | 6 | 7 | 8 | Final |
| Ontario (Middaugh) | 3 | 2 | 0 | 2 | 0 | 3 | 0 | X | 10 |
| Nova Scotia (Saulnier) | 0 | 0 | 1 | 0 | 2 | 0 | 1 | X | 4 |

| Sheet E | 1 | 2 | 3 | 4 | 5 | 6 | 7 | 8 | Final |
| Prince Edward Island (McInnis) | 0 | 0 | 1 | 2 | 0 | 0 | 1 | 0 | 4 |
| Saskatchewan (Holland) | 1 | 1 | 0 | 0 | 1 | 1 | 0 | 1 | 5 |

| Sheet F | 1 | 2 | 3 | 4 | 5 | 6 | 7 | 8 | Final |
| Quebec (Gagnon) | 0 | 0 | 0 | 1 | 2 | 1 | 0 | 0 | 4 |
| Newfoundland and Labrador (Saunders) | 1 | 2 | 0 | 0 | 0 | 0 | 2 | 1 | 6 |

==== Draw 8 ====
Monday, December 1, 6:00 pm

| Sheet A | 1 | 2 | 3 | 4 | 5 | 6 | 7 | 8 | Final |
| Northwest Territories (Cormier) | 1 | 0 | 1 | 0 | 1 | 1 | 0 | X | 4 |
| Ontario (Middaugh) | 0 | 4 | 0 | 2 | 0 | 0 | 3 | X | 9 |

| Sheet B | 1 | 2 | 3 | 4 | 5 | 6 | 7 | 8 | Final |
| Northern Ontario (MacInnes) | 0 | 1 | 2 | 0 | 2 | 0 | 0 | X | 5 |
| Alberta (DeJong) | 3 | 0 | 0 | 3 | 0 | 3 | 5 | X | 14 |

| Sheet C | 1 | 2 | 3 | 4 | 5 | 6 | 7 | 8 | Final |
| Newfoundland and Labrador (Saunders) | 0 | 2 | 0 | 0 | 1 | 0 | 0 | X | 3 |
| Manitoba (Lang) | 2 | 0 | 2 | 1 | 0 | 2 | 1 | X | 8 |

| Sheet D | 1 | 2 | 3 | 4 | 5 | 6 | 7 | 8 | Final |
| Nunavut (Chislett) | 0 | 1 | 0 | 0 | 1 | 0 | X | X | 2 |
| Prince Edward Island (McInnis) | 4 | 0 | 1 | 2 | 0 | 4 | X | X | 11 |

| Sheet E | 1 | 2 | 3 | 4 | 5 | 6 | 7 | 8 | Final |
| Quebec (Gagnon) | 1 | 1 | 0 | 0 | 1 | 0 | 5 | X | 8 |
| New Brunswick (Graham) | 0 | 0 | 1 | 2 | 0 | 1 | 0 | X | 4 |

| Sheet F | 1 | 2 | 3 | 4 | 5 | 6 | 7 | 8 | Final |
| British Columbia (Cowan) | 3 | 0 | 3 | 0 | 4 | 0 | X | X | 10 |
| Yukon (Horte) | 0 | 1 | 0 | 1 | 0 | 1 | X | X | 3 |

==== Draw 10 ====
Tuesday, December 2, 2:00 pm

| Sheet A | 1 | 2 | 3 | 4 | 5 | 6 | 7 | 8 | Final |
| Manitoba (Lang) | 1 | 0 | 4 | 0 | 0 | 2 | 0 | X | 7 |
| Quebec (Gagnon) | 0 | 1 | 0 | 1 | 1 | 0 | 1 | X | 4 |

| Sheet B | 1 | 2 | 3 | 4 | 5 | 6 | 7 | 8 | Final |
| Saskatchewan (Holland) | 0 | 0 | 1 | 1 | 0 | 2 | 0 | 0 | 4 |
| British Columbia (Cowan) | 1 | 1 | 0 | 0 | 1 | 0 | 2 | 2 | 7 |

| Sheet C | 1 | 2 | 3 | 4 | 5 | 6 | 7 | 8 | Final |
| Nova Scotia (Saulnier) | 0 | 2 | 0 | 0 | 2 | 1 | 2 | 2 | 9 |
| New Brunswick (Graham) | 0 | 0 | 1 | 3 | 0 | 0 | 0 | 0 | 4 |

| Sheet D | 1 | 2 | 3 | 4 | 5 | 6 | 7 | 8 | Final |
| Alberta (DeJong) | 3 | 0 | 1 | 0 | 2 | 0 | 0 | 2 | 8 |
| Yukon (Horte) | 0 | 1 | 0 | 3 | 0 | 1 | 1 | 0 | 6 |

| Sheet E | 1 | 2 | 3 | 4 | 5 | 6 | 7 | 8 | Final |
| Newfoundland and Labrador (Saunders) | 2 | 0 | 1 | 0 | 0 | 0 | 0 | X | 3 |
| Northwest Territories (Cormier) | 0 | 1 | 0 | 2 | 1 | 2 | 1 | X | 7 |

| Sheet F | 1 | 2 | 3 | 4 | 5 | 6 | 7 | 8 | 9 | Final |
| Nunavut (Chislett) | 0 | 1 | 4 | 0 | 0 | 1 | 1 | 0 | 0 | 7 |
| Northern Ontario (MacInnes) | 5 | 0 | 0 | 1 | 0 | 0 | 0 | 1 | 2 | 9 |

==== Draw 12 ====
Wednesday, December 3, 10:00 am

| Sheet A | 1 | 2 | 3 | 4 | 5 | 6 | 7 | 8 | Final |
| Nova Scotia (Saulnier) | 0 | 0 | 2 | 1 | 1 | 0 | 3 | 0 | 7 |
| Newfoundland and Labrador (Saunders) | 0 | 1 | 0 | 0 | 0 | 2 | 0 | 1 | 4 |

| Sheet B | 1 | 2 | 3 | 4 | 5 | 6 | 7 | 8 | Final |
| Yukon (Horte) | 3 | 0 | 1 | 0 | 2 | 0 | 0 | 2 | 8 |
| Prince Edward Island (McInnis) | 0 | 2 | 0 | 2 | 0 | 1 | 2 | 0 | 7 |

| Sheet C | 1 | 2 | 3 | 4 | 5 | 6 | 7 | 8 | Final |
| British Columbia (Cowan) | 1 | 0 | 1 | 4 | 1 | 0 | 3 | X | 10 |
| Nunavut (Chislett) | 0 | 3 | 0 | 0 | 0 | 1 | 0 | X | 4 |

| Sheet D | 1 | 2 | 3 | 4 | 5 | 6 | 7 | 8 | Final |
| Saskatchewan (Holland) | 2 | 0 | 2 | 3 | 2 | 2 | X | X | 11 |
| Northern Ontario (MacInnes) | 0 | 2 | 0 | 0 | 0 | 0 | X | X | 2 |

| Sheet E | 1 | 2 | 3 | 4 | 5 | 6 | 7 | 8 | Final |
| Ontario (Middaugh) | 2 | 0 | 3 | 0 | 0 | 1 | 0 | X | 6 |
| Manitoba (Lang) | 0 | 1 | 0 | 1 | 1 | 0 | 1 | X | 4 |

| Sheet F | 1 | 2 | 3 | 4 | 5 | 6 | 7 | 8 | Final |
| New Brunswick (Graham) | 0 | 0 | 1 | 0 | 3 | 0 | 0 | 1 | 5 |
| Northwest Territories (Cormier) | 1 | 1 | 0 | 1 | 0 | 1 | 0 | 0 | 4 |

==== Draw 14 ====
Wednesday, December 3, 6:00 pm

| Sheet A | 1 | 2 | 3 | 4 | 5 | 6 | 7 | 8 | Final |
| Prince Edward Island (McInnis) | 2 | 1 | 1 | 0 | 1 | 0 | 0 | 0 | 5 |
| British Columbia (Cowan) | 0 | 0 | 0 | 3 | 0 | 2 | 2 | 4 | 11 |

| Sheet B | 1 | 2 | 3 | 4 | 5 | 6 | 7 | 8 | Final |
| Northwest Territories (Cormier) | 1 | 0 | 0 | 0 | 0 | 0 | 0 | X | 1 |
| Nova Scotia (Saulnier) | 0 | 0 | 1 | 1 | 0 | 2 | 1 | X | 5 |

| Sheet C | 1 | 2 | 3 | 4 | 5 | 6 | 7 | 8 | Final |
| Quebec (Gagnon) | 0 | 1 | 0 | 0 | 0 | 0 | 3 | X | 4 |
| Ontario (Middaugh) | 1 | 0 | 3 | 1 | 0 | 1 | 0 | X | 6 |

| Sheet D | 1 | 2 | 3 | 4 | 5 | 6 | 7 | 8 | Final |
| New Brunswick (Graham) | 0 | 2 | 1 | 2 | 0 | 0 | 0 | 1 | 6 |
| Newfoundland and Labrador (Saunders) | 2 | 0 | 0 | 0 | 1 | 1 | 0 | 0 | 4 |

| Sheet E | 1 | 2 | 3 | 4 | 5 | 6 | 7 | 8 | Final |
| Yukon (Horte) | 1 | 1 | 0 | 3 | 2 | 0 | 1 | X | 8 |
| Nunavut (Chislett) | 0 | 0 | 1 | 0 | 0 | 1 | 0 | X | 2 |

| Sheet F | 1 | 2 | 3 | 4 | 5 | 6 | 7 | 8 | Final |
| Alberta (DeJong) | 1 | 0 | 0 | 0 | 2 | 0 | 1 | X | 4 |
| Saskatchewan (Holland) | 0 | 2 | 2 | 2 | 0 | 2 | 0 | X | 8 |

=== Seeding pool ===
==== Standings ====
Final Seeding Pool Standings

| Team | Skip | W | L | W-L | LSD |
|---|---|---|---|---|---|
| Prince Edward Island | Susan McInnis | 4 | 4 | – | 83.54 |
| Newfoundland and Labrador | Jody Saunders | 3 | 5 | – | 97.46 |
| Northern Ontario | Valerie MacInnes | 2 | 6 | 1–0 | 149.01 |
| Northwest Territories | Sharon Cormier | 2 | 6 | 1–1 | 78.34 |
| Quebec | Nathalie Gagnon | 2 | 6 | 0–1 | 89.46 |
| Nunavut | Geneva Chislett | 0 | 8 | – | 128.90 |

==== Results ====
===== Draw 15 =====
Thursday, December 4, 8:30 am

| Sheet A | 1 | 2 | 3 | 4 | 5 | 6 | 7 | 8 | Final |
| Northwest Territories (Cormier) | 0 | 0 | 2 | 0 | 0 | 1 | 0 | X | 3 |
| Prince Edward Island (McInnis) | 1 | 2 | 0 | 1 | 2 | 0 | 5 | X | 11 |

===== Draw 16 =====
Thursday, December 4, 12:30 pm

| Sheet F | 1 | 2 | 3 | 4 | 5 | 6 | 7 | 8 | Final |
| Northern Ontario (MacInnes) | 2 | 0 | 2 | 0 | 2 | 0 | 0 | 0 | 6 |
| Newfoundland and Labrador (Saunders) | 0 | 1 | 0 | 3 | 0 | 3 | 1 | 2 | 10 |

===== Draw 17 =====
Thursday, December 4, 4:30 pm

| Sheet A | 1 | 2 | 3 | 4 | 5 | 6 | 7 | 8 | Final |
| Quebec (Gagnon) | 1 | 0 | 2 | 4 | 2 | 2 | X | X | 11 |
| Nunavut (Chislett) | 0 | 1 | 0 | 0 | 0 | 0 | X | X | 1 |

===== Draw 18 =====
Thursday, December 4, 8:30 pm

| Sheet F | 1 | 2 | 3 | 4 | 5 | 6 | 7 | 8 | Final |
| Prince Edward Island (McInnis) | 1 | 0 | 2 | 1 | 1 | 1 | 0 | X | 6 |
| Quebec (Gagnon) | 0 | 0 | 0 | 0 | 0 | 0 | 1 | X | 1 |

===== Draw 21 =====
Friday, December 5, 4:30 pm

| Sheet C | 1 | 2 | 3 | 4 | 5 | 6 | 7 | 8 | Final |
| Nunavut (Chislett) | 0 | 0 | 0 | 1 | 2 | 0 | 1 | X | 4 |
| Newfoundland and Labrador (Saunders) | 2 | 1 | 3 | 0 | 0 | 1 | 0 | X | 7 |

===== Draw 23 =====
Saturday, December 6, 10:00 am

| Sheet F | 1 | 2 | 3 | 4 | 5 | 6 | 7 | 8 | Final |
| Northwest Territories (Cormier) | 0 | 2 | 0 | 0 | 3 | 0 | 0 | X | 5 |
| Northern Ontario (MacInnes) | 1 | 0 | 3 | 2 | 0 | 3 | 1 | X | 10 |

=== Championship pool ===
==== Standings ====
Final Championship Pool Standings

Key
| Teams to Playoffs |

| Team | Skip | W | L | W-L | LSD |
|---|---|---|---|---|---|
| Ontario | Sherry Middaugh | 10 | 0 | – | 60.26 |
| British Columbia | Shiella Cowan | 8 | 2 | 1–0 | 60.81 |
| Saskatchewan | Amber Holland | 8 | 2 | 0–1 | 55.34 |
| Nova Scotia | Andrea Saulnier | 7 | 3 | – | 90.37 |
| Alberta | Delia DeJong | 6 | 4 | – | 79.27 |
| Yukon | Rhonda Horte | 5 | 5 | – | 82.29 |
| New Brunswick | Shelly Graham | 4 | 6 | – | 95.78 |
| Manitoba | Marlene Lang | 3 | 7 | – | 52.89 |

==== Results ====
===== Draw 15 =====
Thursday, December 4, 8:30 am

| Sheet B | 1 | 2 | 3 | 4 | 5 | 6 | 7 | 8 | Final |
| Yukon (Horte) | 0 | 1 | 0 | 1 | 1 | 0 | 0 | X | 3 |
| Ontario (Middaugh) | 1 | 0 | 1 | 0 | 0 | 4 | 2 | X | 8 |

| Sheet C | 1 | 2 | 3 | 4 | 5 | 6 | 7 | 8 | Final |
| Nova Scotia (Saulnier) | 0 | 0 | 0 | 0 | 0 | 2 | 0 | X | 2 |
| British Columbia (Cowan) | 2 | 3 | 1 | 1 | 1 | 0 | 4 | X | 12 |

| Sheet D | 1 | 2 | 3 | 4 | 5 | 6 | 7 | 8 | Final |
| New Brunswick (Graham) | 1 | 1 | 4 | 0 | 0 | 0 | 0 | 0 | 6 |
| Saskatchewan (Holland) | 0 | 0 | 0 | 1 | 3 | 2 | 1 | 1 | 8 |

| Sheet E | 1 | 2 | 3 | 4 | 5 | 6 | 7 | 8 | Final |
| Alberta (DeJong) | 0 | 2 | 1 | 4 | 1 | 1 | X | X | 9 |
| Manitoba (Lang) | 1 | 0 | 0 | 0 | 0 | 0 | X | X | 1 |

===== Draw 17 =====
Thursday, December 4, 4:30 pm

| Sheet B | 1 | 2 | 3 | 4 | 5 | 6 | 7 | 8 | Final |
| Manitoba (Lang) | 1 | 0 | 0 | 0 | 0 | 0 | X | X | 1 |
| Saskatchewan (Holland) | 0 | 2 | 1 | 1 | 3 | 1 | X | X | 8 |

| Sheet C | 1 | 2 | 3 | 4 | 5 | 6 | 7 | 8 | Final |
| Ontario (Middaugh) | 1 | 1 | 0 | 2 | 1 | 0 | 4 | X | 9 |
| Alberta (DeJong) | 0 | 0 | 2 | 0 | 0 | 1 | 0 | X | 3 |

| Sheet D | 1 | 2 | 3 | 4 | 5 | 6 | 7 | 8 | Final |
| Yukon (Horte) | 1 | 0 | 1 | 0 | 1 | 0 | 0 | 0 | 3 |
| Nova Scotia (Saulnier) | 0 | 2 | 0 | 2 | 0 | 1 | 1 | 1 | 7 |

| Sheet E | 1 | 2 | 3 | 4 | 5 | 6 | 7 | 8 | Final |
| British Columbia (Cowan) | 1 | 0 | 0 | 2 | 0 | 0 | 2 | 0 | 5 |
| New Brunswick (Graham) | 0 | 1 | 2 | 0 | 2 | 1 | 0 | 1 | 7 |

===== Draw 20 =====
Friday, December 5, 12:30 am

| Sheet C | 1 | 2 | 3 | 4 | 5 | 6 | 7 | 8 | Final |
| Nova Scotia (Saulnier) | 0 | 0 | 2 | 1 | 0 | 1 | 0 | 3 | 7 |
| Alberta (DeJong) | 0 | 0 | 0 | 0 | 5 | 0 | 1 | 0 | 6 |

| Sheet D | 1 | 2 | 3 | 4 | 5 | 6 | 7 | 8 | Final |
| New Brunswick (Graham) | 1 | 0 | 0 | 0 | 0 | 1 | 0 | X | 2 |
| Yukon (Horte) | 0 | 1 | 3 | 1 | 1 | 0 | 3 | X | 9 |

===== Draw 21 =====
Friday, December 5, 4:30 pm

| Sheet A | 1 | 2 | 3 | 4 | 5 | 6 | 7 | 8 | Final |
| Saskatchewan (Holland) | 0 | 1 | 1 | 1 | 0 | 2 | 0 | X | 5 |
| Nova Scotia (Saulnier) | 0 | 0 | 0 | 0 | 1 | 0 | 1 | X | 2 |

| Sheet C | 1 | 2 | 3 | 4 | 5 | 6 | 7 | 8 | Final |
| Manitoba (Lang) | 2 | 0 | 0 | 0 | 0 | 0 | 1 | X | 3 |
| Yukon (Horte) | 0 | 4 | 0 | 1 | 1 | 1 | 0 | X | 7 |

| Sheet D | 1 | 2 | 3 | 4 | 5 | 6 | 7 | 8 | Final |
| Ontario (Middaugh) | 1 | 1 | 0 | 1 | 0 | 4 | 0 | 0 | 7 |
| British Columbia (Cowan) | 0 | 0 | 2 | 0 | 1 | 0 | 2 | 1 | 6 |

| Sheet F | 1 | 2 | 3 | 4 | 5 | 6 | 7 | 8 | Final |
| Alberta (DeJong) | 3 | 3 | 0 | 2 | 0 | 3 | 0 | X | 11 |
| New Brunswick (Graham) | 0 | 0 | 1 | 0 | 4 | 0 | 1 | X | 6 |

==== Draw 22 ====
Friday, December 5, 8:30 pm

| Sheet B | 1 | 2 | 3 | 4 | 5 | 6 | 7 | 8 | Final |
| Saskatchewan (Holland) | 1 | 0 | 0 | 0 | 3 | 0 | 1 | 0 | 5 |
| Ontario (Middaugh) | 0 | 0 | 2 | 2 | 0 | 1 | 0 | 1 | 6 |

| Sheet E | 1 | 2 | 3 | 4 | 5 | 6 | 7 | 8 | 9 | Final |
| British Columbia (Cowan) | 0 | 3 | 0 | 3 | 0 | 1 | 0 | 1 | 1 | 9 |
| Manitoba (Lang) | 2 | 0 | 2 | 0 | 2 | 0 | 2 | 0 | 0 | 8 |

=== Playoffs ===
Semifinals
1 | Ontario | 5
4 | Nova Scotia | 3
2 | British Columbia | 3
3 | Saskatchewan | 7

Final
1 | Ontario | 7
3 | Saskatchewan | 5
Bronze Medal Game
4 | Nova Scotia | 2
2 | British Columbia | 6

==== Semifinals ====
Saturday, December 6, 10:00 am

| Sheet D | 1 | 2 | 3 | 4 | 5 | 6 | 7 | 8 | Final |
| Ontario (Middaugh) | 0 | 1 | 0 | 0 | 2 | 2 | 0 | X | 5 |
| Nova Scotia (Saulnier) | 0 | 0 | 1 | 1 | 0 | 0 | 1 | X | 3 |

| Sheet E | 1 | 2 | 3 | 4 | 5 | 6 | 7 | 8 | Final |
| British Columbia (Cowan) | 0 | 0 | 1 | 1 | 0 | 0 | 1 | 0 | 3 |
| Saskatchewan (Holland) | 2 | 1 | 0 | 0 | 1 | 1 | 0 | 2 | 7 |

==== Bronze medal game ====
Saturday, December 6, 3:00 pm

| Sheet B | 1 | 2 | 3 | 4 | 5 | 6 | 7 | 8 | Final |
| British Columbia (Cowan) | 0 | 1 | 1 | 0 | 1 | 2 | 1 | X | 6 |
| Nova Scotia (Saulnier) | 1 | 0 | 0 | 1 | 0 | 0 | 0 | X | 2 |

==== Final ====
Saturday, December 6, 3:00 pm

| Sheet C | 1 | 2 | 3 | 4 | 5 | 6 | 7 | 8 | Final |
| Ontario (Middaugh) | 0 | 4 | 0 | 0 | 1 | 0 | 2 | X | 7 |
| Saskatchewan (Holland) | 1 | 0 | 2 | 1 | 0 | 1 | 0 | X | 5 |

=== Women's Final Standings ===
| Place | Team |
|---|---|
| 1st place, gold medalist(s) | Ontario |
| 2nd place, silver medalist(s) | Saskatchewan |
| 3rd place, bronze medalist(s) | British Columbia |
| 4 | Nova Scotia |
| 5 | Alberta |
| 6 | Yukon |
| 7 | New Brunswick |
| 8 | Manitoba |

| Place | Team |
|---|---|
| 9 | Prince Edward Island |
| 10 | Newfoundland and Labrador |
| 11 | Northern Ontario |
| 12 | Northwest Territories |
| 13 | Quebec |
| 14 | Nunavut |
