= 1994 World Junior Curling Championships =

- Host city: Sofia, Bulgaria
- Arena: Winter Sports Palace
- Dates: 2-9 April
- Men's winner: Canada (7th title)
- Skip: Colin Davison
- Third: Kelly Mittelstadt
- Second: Scott Pfeifer
- Lead: Sean Morris
- Alternate: Rob Simpson
- Finalist: Germany (Daniel Herberg)
- Women's winner: Canada (3rd title)
- Skip: Kim Gellard
- Third: Cori Beveridge
- Second: Lisa Savage
- Lead: Sandy Graham
- Alternate: Heather Crockett
- Finalist: United States (Erika Brown)

The 1994 World Junior Curling Championships were held from 2 to 9 April at Winter Sports Palace in Sofia, Bulgaria.

== Men ==
=== Teams ===
| Country | Skip | Third | Second | Lead | Alternate | Coach |
|---|---|---|---|---|---|---|
| Bulgaria | Ivaylo Petrov | Kiril Kirilov | Bojidar Momerin | Ianakiev Evtimov | Stanimir Petrov | |
| Canada | Colin Davison | Kelly Mittelstadt | Scott Pfeifer | Sean Morris | Rob Simpson | |
| Denmark | Johnny Frederiksen | Kenneth Hertsdahl | Lars Vilandt | Bo Jensen | Lars Nissen | |
| France | Spencer Mugnier | Thomas Dufour | Sylvain Ducroz | Philippe Caux | Cyrille Prunet | |
| Germany | Daniel Herberg | Stephan Knoll | Oliver Trevisiol | Markus Rohrmoser | Hans-Peter Kiess | |
| Japan | Hiroshi Sato | Nobumitsu Fujisawa | Yoshihiro Kataoka | Naoki Kudo | Hidetaka Sunaga | |
| Scotland | Craig Wilson | Neil Murdoch | Ricky Burnett | Craig Strawhorn | Euan Byers | Robin Halliday |
| Sweden | Per Granqvist | Emil Marklund | Peter Hillbom | Emil Nordkvist | Joakim Carlsson | |
| Switzerland | Yannick Renggli | Chrislian Razafimahefa | Gregory Renggli | Patrick Tinembart | Ralph Stöckli | |
| United States | Mike Peplinski | Craig Brown | Ryan Braudt | Cory Ward | Ryan Quinn | |

=== Round Robin ===
Key
| Teams to Playoffs |

| Place | Country | 1 | 2 | 3 | 4 | 5 | 6 | 7 | 8 | 9 | 10 | Wins | Losses |
|---|---|---|---|---|---|---|---|---|---|---|---|---|---|
| 1 | United States | * | 7:0 | 7:5 | 7:1 | 7:3 | 8:6 | 4:10 | 6:2 | 10:4 | 8:2 | 8 | 1 |
| 2 | Germany | 0:7 | * | 4:6 | 5:2 | 10:7 | 6:3 | 5:3 | 1:7 | 5:4 | 8:5 | 6 | 3 |
| 3 | Switzerland | 5:7 | 6:4 | * | 3:8 | 10:4 | 8:3 | 5:7 | 5:3 | 10:1 | 10:3 | 6 | 3 |
| 4 | Canada | 1:7 | 2:5 | 8:3 | * | 6:4 | 5:7 | 9:4 | 8:2 | 10:5 | 7:4 | 6 | 3 |
| 5 | Scotland | 3:7 | 7:10 | 4:10 | 4:6 | * | W | 6:5 | 6:4 | 12:3 | 11:4 | 5 | 4 |
| 6 | Sweden | 6:8 | 3:6 | 3:8 | 7:5 | L | * | 6:3 | 6:3 | 5:4 | 7:1 | 5 | 4 |
| 7 | France | 10:4 | 3:5 | 7:5 | 4:9 | 5:6 | 3:6 | * | 8:10 | 6:4 | 10:2 | 4 | 5 |
| 8 | Denmark | 2:6 | 7:1 | 3:5 | 2:8 | 4:6 | 3:6 | 10:8 | * | 5:6 | 10:2 | 3 | 6 |
| 9 | Japan | 4:10 | 4:5 | 1:10 | 5:10 | 3:12 | 4:5 | 4:6 | 6:5 | * | 7:6 | 2 | 7 |
| 10 | Bulgaria | 2:8 | 5:8 | 3:10 | 4:7 | 4:11 | 1:7 | 2:10 | 2:10 | 6:7 | * | 0 | 9 |

(«W» — technical win; «L» — technical loss)

=== Playoffs ===
Semifinals
1 | United States | 5
4 | Canada | 8
2 | Germany | 7
3 | Switzerland | 2

Gold Medal Game
4 | Canada | 6
2 | Germany | 2

=== Rankings ===
| Place | Country | Games | Wins | Losses |
|---|---|---|---|---|
| 1st place, gold medalist(s) | Canada | 11 | 8 | 3 |
| 2nd place, silver medalist(s) | Germany | 11 | 7 | 4 |
| 3rd place, bronze medalist(s) | Switzerland | 10 | 6 | 4 |
| 3rd place, bronze medalist(s) | United States | 10 | 8 | 2 |
| 5 | Scotland | 9 | 5 | 4 |
| 6 | Sweden | 9 | 5 | 4 |
| 7 | France | 9 | 4 | 5 |
| 8 | Denmark | 9 | 3 | 6 |
| 9 | Japan | 9 | 2 | 7 |
| 10 | Bulgaria | 9 | 0 | 9 |

== Women ==
=== Teams ===
| Country | Skip | Third | Second | Lead | Alternate | Coach |
|---|---|---|---|---|---|---|
| Bulgaria | Marina Karagiozova | Zvetelina Karagiozova | Rumiana Atanasova | Anna Tzaneva | Rousiana Rouskova | |
| Canada | Kim Gellard | Cori Beveridge | Lisa Savage | Sandy Graham | Heather Crockett | |
| Denmark | Angelina Jensen | Dorthe Holm | Kamilla Schack | Helene Jensen | Charlotte Hedegaard | |
| Germany | Gerrit Müller | Marion Klotz | Anja Messenzehl | Manon Stockhammar | Britta Weddige | |
| Japan | Hitomi Suzuki | Mika Hori | Fumiko Hirosawa | Kozue Hasegawa | Yumiko Abe | |
| Norway | Marianne Haslum | Kristin Løvseth | Elisabeth Sandberg | Hege Korstadshagen | Ellen Kittelsen | Thoralf Hognestad |
| Scotland | Gillian Howard | Kirsty Hynd | Alison Kinghorn | Sandra Hynd | Fiona Brown | |
| Sweden | Ulrika Bergman (4th) | Margaretha Lindahl (skip) | Anna Bergström | Maria "Mia" Zackrisson | Maria Engholm | |
| Switzerland | Manuela Kormann | Sandra Zaugg | Miriam Wymann | Isabelle Zaugg | Brigitte Portmann | |
| United States | Erika Brown | Debbie Henry | Stacey Liapis | Analissa Johnson | Allison Darragh | |

=== Round Robin ===
Key
| Teams to Playoffs |

| Place | Country | 1 | 2 | 3 | 4 | 5 | 6 | 7 | 8 | 9 | 10 | Wins | Losses |
|---|---|---|---|---|---|---|---|---|---|---|---|---|---|
| 1 | Canada | * | 7:4 | 5:3 | 5:9 | 7:4 | 9:7 | 9:5 | 7:6 | 10:3 | 9:1 | 8 | 1 |
| 2 | Denmark | 4:7 | * | 9:3 | 4:6 | 10:5 | 10:4 | 6:3 | 10:4 | 7:5 | 14:3 | 7 | 2 |
| 3 | United States | 3:5 | 3:9 | * | 9:4 | 3:6 | 5:4 | 6:5 | 10:2 | 9:3 | 12:2 | 6 | 3 |
| 4 | Sweden | 9:5 | 6:4 | 4:9 | * | 8:9 | 3:5 | 9:3 | 10:2 | 9:5 | 14:3 | 6 | 3 |
| 5 | Norway | 4:7 | 5:10 | 6:3 | 9:8 | * | 5:3 | 4:12 | 12:7 | 3:6 | 12:6 | 5 | 4 |
| 6 | Switzerland | 7:9 | 4:10 | 4:5 | 5:3 | 3:5 | * | 8:7 | 8:4 | 7:5 | 11:3 | 5 | 4 |
| 7 | Scotland | 5:9 | 3:6 | 5:6 | 3:9 | 12:4 | 7:8 | * | 9:3 | 7:4 | 13:0 | 4 | 5 |
| 8 | Germany | 6:7 | 4:10 | 2:10 | 2:10 | 7:12 | 4:8 | 3:9 | * | 11:5 | 12:2 | 2 | 7 |
| 8 | Japan | 3:10 | 5:7 | 3:9 | 5:9 | 6:3 | 5:7 | 4:7 | 5:11 | * | 9:6 | 2 | 7 |
| 10 | Bulgaria | 1:9 | 3:14 | 2:12 | 3:14 | 6:12 | 3:11 | 0:13 | 2:12 | 6:9 | * | 0 | 9 |

=== Playoffs ===
Semifinals
1 | Canada | 8
4 | Sweden | 2
2 | Denmark | 6
3 | United States | 7

Gold Medal Game
1 | Canada | 9
3 | United States | 7

=== Rankings ===
| Place | Country | Games | Wins | Losses |
|---|---|---|---|---|
| 1st place, gold medalist(s) | Canada | 11 | 10 | 1 |
| 2nd place, silver medalist(s) | United States | 11 | 7 | 4 |
| 3rd place, bronze medalist(s) | Sweden | 10 | 6 | 4 |
| 3rd place, bronze medalist(s) | Denmark | 10 | 7 | 3 |
| 5 | Norway | 9 | 5 | 4 |
| 6 | Switzerland | 9 | 5 | 4 |
| 7 | Scotland | 9 | 4 | 5 |
| 8 | Germany | 9 | 2 | 7 |
| 9 | Japan | 9 | 2 | 7 |
| 10 | Bulgaria | 9 | 0 | 9 |

== Awards ==
WJCC All-Star Team:

| | Skip | Third | Second | Lead |
|---|---|---|---|---|
| Men | (United States) Mike Peplinski | (United States) Craig Brown | (Scotland) Ricky Burnett | (Sweden) Emil Nordkvist |
| Women | (Canada) Kim Gellard | (Denmark) Dorthe Holm | (Sweden) Anna Bergström | (Sweden) Maria "Mia" Zackrisson |

WJCC Sportsmanship Award:

| Men | (Germany) Daniel Herberg |
| Women | (Germany) Gerrit Müller |

== Sources ==
- Men's results from the World Curling Federation
- Women's results from the World Curling Federation
