= Corie Beveridge =

Canadian curler

- Curler

Team
- Curling club: Unionville CC, Markham; St. Catharines CC, St. Catharines

Curling career
- Member Association: Ontario
- Hearts: 2 (1996, 1997)
- World Championship: 1 (1996)
- Other appearances: World Junior Championships: 1 (1994)
Medal record
Curling
Representing Canada
World Championships
Gold medal – first place	1996 Hamilton
World Junior Championships
Gold medal – first place	1994 Sofia
Representing Ontario
Scotties Tournament of Hearts
Gold medal – first place	1996 Thunder Bay

Corrine "Corie" Beveridge (born 1974) is a Canadian curler.

She is a 1996 World women's champion and 1996 Canadian women's champion.

== Awards ==
- Scotties Tournament of Hearts All-Star Team: (1997, Second team, second)

== Personal life ==
Beveridge is a graduate of Markham District High School. She attended McMaster University in mechanical engineering.

== Teams and events ==
Season	Skip	Third	Second	Lead	Alternate	Coach	Events
1990–91	Deborah Green	Kim Gellard	Lisa Rowsell	Corrine Beveridge			CJCC 1991 (6th)
1991–92	Heather Crockett	Kim Gellard	Johnalee Fraser	Corie Beveridge			CJCC 1992 (bronze)
1992–93	Kim Gellard	Corie Beveridge	Lisa Savage	Sandy Graham			CJCC 1993 (gold)
1993–94	Kim Gellard	Corie Beveridge	Lisa Savage	Sandy Graham	Heather Crockett		WJCC 1994 (gold)
1995–96	Marilyn Bodogh	Kim Gellard	Corie Beveridge	Jane Hooper Perroud	Lisa Savage		STOH 1996 (gold); WCC 1996 (gold)
1996–97	Marilyn Bodogh	Kim Gellard	Corie Beveridge	Jane Hooper Perroud	Lisa Savage	Mary Gellard	STOH 1997 (8th)
1997–98	Marilyn Bodogh	Kim Gellard	Corie Beveridge	Jane Hooper Perroud			COCT 1997 (6th)
2001–02	Sherry Fraser	Diane McLean	Corie Beveridge	Christine Jurgenson	Marla Mallett		COCT 2001 (9th)
