= Helen Edlund =

Swedish female curler

- Curler ♀
- Born: April 11, 1968 (age 58)

Team
- Curling club: Sundsvalls CK, Sundsvall

Curling career
- Member Association: Sweden
- World Championship: 1 (1996)
Medal record
Curling

Helen Maria Edlund (born April 11, 1968) is a Swedish female curler.

== Teams ==
=== Women's ===
| Season | Skip | Third | Second | Lead | Alternate | Events |
|---|---|---|---|---|---|---|
| 1995–96 | Annette Jörnlind | Helen Edlund | Erika Westman | Helene Jonsson | Elisabet Gustafson | WCC 1996 (7th) |

=== Mixed ===
| Season | Skip | Third | Second | Lead | Events |
|---|---|---|---|---|---|
| 2002–03 | Annette Jörnlind | Thomas Feldt | Helen Edlund | Olle Jörnlind | SMxCC 2003 (bronze) |
| 2013–14 | Thomas Feldt | Annette Feldt Jörnlind | Roine Söderlund | Helen Edlund | SMxCC 2014 (13th) |

== Private life ==
Her brother is Swedish curler Henrik Edlund, who played in the 2008 European Championships and in two World Junior Championships (1995, 1998).
