= Helene Jonsson =

Swedish curler

- Curler ♀
- Born: 11 March 1971 (age 55)

Team
- Curling club: Sundsvalls CK, Sundsvall

Curling career
- Member Association: Sweden
- World Championship: 1 (1996)
Medal record
Curling

Helene Elisabeth Jonsson (born 11 March 1971) is a Swedish female curler.

== Teams ==
Season	Skip	Third	Second	Lead	Alternate	Events
1995–96	Annette Jörnlind	Helen Edlund	Erika Westman	Helene Jonsson	Elisabet Gustafson	WCC 1996 (7th)
