= Caroline Gruss =

Swiss curler

- Curler ♀

Team
- Curling club: Lausanne-Nestlé CC, Lozanne

Curling career
- Member Association: Switzerland
- World Championship: 1 (1996)
- Other appearances: World Junior Championships: 1 (1993)
Medal record
Curling
Swiss Women's Championship
Gold medal – first place	1996 Arlesheim
Swiss Junior Championships
Gold medal – first place	1992 Lausanne-Ouchy

Caroline Gruss is a Swiss curler.

At the national level, she is a 1996 Swiss women's champion and a 1992 Swiss junior champion curler.

== Teams ==
=== Women's ===
Season	Skip	Third	Second	Lead	Alternate	Events
1991–92	Caroline Gruss	Magali Pont	Sylvie Meillaud	Nancy Guignard		SJCC 1992 (gold)
1992–93	Caroline Gruss	Magali Pont	Sylvie Meillaud	Nancy Guignard	Manuela Kormann	WJCC 1993 (9th)
1995–96	Caroline Gruss	Corinne Anneler	Sylvie Meillaud	Sahel Reiser	Barbara Schenkel	SWCC 1996 (gold); WCC 1996 (7th)
