= 1996 World Women's Curling Championship =

- Host city: Hamilton, Ontario, Canada
- Arena: Copps Coliseum
- Dates: March 23–31, 1996
- Winner: Canada
- Curling club: St. Catharines CC, Ontario
- Skip: Marilyn Bodogh
- Third: Kim Gellard
- Second: Cori Beveridge
- Lead: Jane Hooper Perroud
- Alternate: Lisa Savage
- Finalist: United States (Lisa Schoeneberg)

The 1996 World Women's Curling Championship (branded as 1996 Ford World Women's Curling Championship for sponsorship reasons) was held at Copps Coliseum in Hamilton, Ontario, Canada from March 23–31, 1996.

== Teams ==
Canada	Denmark	Finland	Germany	Japan
St. Catharines CC, St. Catharines, Ontario Skip: Marilyn Bodogh; Third: Kim Gellard; Second: Cori Beveridge; Lead: Jane Hooper Perroud; Alternate: Lisa Savage	Hvidovre CC Skip: Dorthe Holm; Third: Margit Pörtner; Second: Helene Jensen; Lead: Lisa Richardson; Alternate: Helena Blach Lavrsen	Hyvinkää CC Skip: Jaana Jokela; Third: Nina Pöllänen; Second: Anne Eerikäinen; Lead: Laura Franssila; Alternate: Tiina Tenkanen	SC Riessersee, Garmisch-Partenkirchen Skip: Andrea Schöpp; Third: Monika Wagner; Second: Natalie Nessler; Lead: Carina Meidele; Alternate: Heike Schwaller	Tokoro Curling Association, Hokkaido Skip: Ayako Ishigaki; Third: Mayumi Ohkutsu; Second: Yukari Kondo; Lead: Yoko Mimura; Alternate: Akiko Katoh
Norway	Scotland	Sweden	Switzerland	United States
Snarøen CC, Oslo Skip: Dordi Nordby; Third: Marianne Haslum; Second: Marianne Aspelin; Lead: Kristin Løvseth; Alternate: Hanne Woods	Airleywight Ladies CC, Perth Skip: Kirsty Hay; Third: Edith Loudon; Second: Karen Addison; Lead: Katie Loudon; Alternate: Claire Milne	Sundsvalls CK Skip: Annette Jörnlind; Third: Helen Edlund; Second: Erika Westman; Lead: Helene Jonsson; Alternate: Elisabet Gustafson	Lausanne-Nestlé CC Skip: Caroline Gruss; Third: Corinne Anneler; Second: Sylvie Meillaud; Lead: Sahel Reiser; Alternate: Barbara Schenkel	Madison CC, McFarland, Wisconsin Skip: Lisa Schoeneberg; Third: Erika Brown; Second: Lori Mountford; Lead: Allison Darragh; Alternate: Debbie McCormick

== Round robin standings ==
Key
Teams to playoffs
Teams to tiebreaker

Country	Skip	W	L
Canada	Marilyn Bodogh	8	1
United States	Lisa Schoeneberg	7	2
Germany	Andrea Schöpp	6	3
Norway	Dordi Nordby	5	4
Scotland	Kirsty Hay	5	4
Japan	Ayako Ishigaki	4	5
Denmark	Dorthe Holm	3	6
Sweden	Annette Jörnlind	3	6
Switzerland	Caroline Gruss	3	6
Finland	Jaana Jokela	1	8

== Round robin results ==
=== Draw 1 ===
Sheet A	Final
Norway (Nordby)	7
Finland (Jokela)	6

Sheet B	Final
Canada (Bodogh)	6
Germany (Schöpp)	4

Sheet C	Final
Sweden (Jörnlind)	4
Switzerland (Gruss)	7

Sheet D	Final
Scotland (Hay)	3
United States (Schoeneberg)	6

Sheet E	Final
Denmark (Holm)	1
Japan (Ishigaki)	8

=== Draw 2 ===
Sheet A	Final
United States (Schoeneberg)	7
Germany (Schöpp)	6

Sheet B	Final
Japan (Ishigaki)	10
Sweden (Jörnlind)	6

Sheet C	Final
Norway (Nordby)	4
Canada (Bodogh)	8

Sheet D	Final
Switzerland (Gruss)	4
Denmark (Holm)	5

Sheet E	Final
Finland (Jokela)	2
Scotland (Hay)	12

=== Draw 3 ===
Sheet A	Final
Sweden (Jörnlind)	4
Norway (Nordby)	6

Sheet B	Final
Switzerland (Gruss)	6
Scotland (Hay)	8

Sheet C	Final
Germany (Schöpp)	3
Denmark (Holm)	11

Sheet D	Final
Japan (Ishigaki)	11
Finland (Jokela)	4

Sheet E	Final
Canada (Bodogh)	10
United States (Schoeneberg)	6

=== Draw 4 ===
Sheet A	Final
Finland (Jokela)	5
Canada (Bodogh)	8

Sheet B	Final
Denmark (Holm)	7
Norway (Nordby)	2

Sheet C	Final
United States (Schoeneberg)	8
Japan (Ishigaki)	7

Sheet D	Final
Germany (Schöpp)	6
Switzerland (Gruss)	3

Sheet E	Final
Scotland (Hay)	6
Sweden (Jörnlind)	7

=== Draw 5 ===
Sheet A	Final
Switzerland (Gruss)	4
Japan (Ishigaki)	2

Sheet B	Final
Scotland (Hay)	7
Canada (Bodogh)	5

Sheet C	Final
Denmark (Holm)	1
Sweden (Jörnlind)	8

Sheet D	Final
United States (Schoeneberg)	4
Norway (Nordby)	6

Sheet E	Final
Germany (Schöpp)	7
Finland (Jokela)	5

=== Draw 6 ===
Sheet A	Final
Denmark (Holm)	4
United States (Schoeneberg)	10

Sheet B	Final
Germany (Schöpp)	6
Japan (Ishigaki)	4

Sheet C	Final
Scotland (Hay)	5
Norway (Nordby)	9

Sheet D	Final
Finland (Jokela)	3
Sweden (Jörnlind)	10

Sheet E	Final
Switzerland (Gruss)	2
Canada (Bodogh)	10

=== Draw 7 ===
Sheet A	Final
Germany (Schöpp)	10
Scotland (Hay)	7

Sheet B	Final
Sweden (Jörnlind)	6
United States (Schoeneberg)	8

Sheet C	Final
Switzerland (Gruss)	8
Finland (Jokela)	7

Sheet D	Final
Denmark (Holm)	6
Canada (Bodogh)	12

Sheet E	Final
Japan (Ishigaki)	8
Norway (Nordby)	5

=== Draw 8 ===
Sheet A	Final
Canada (Bodogh)	8
Sweden (Jörnlind)	6

Sheet B	Final
Finland (Jokela)	8
Denmark (Holm)	4

Sheet C	Final
Japan (Ishigaki)	7
Scotland (Hay)	8

Sheet D	Final
Norway (Nordby)	3
Germany (Schöpp)	8

Sheet E	Final
United States (Schoeneberg)	7
Switzerland (Gruss)	6

=== Draw 9 ===
Sheet A	Final
Scotland (Hay)	8
Denmark (Holm)	1

Sheet B	Final
Norway (Nordby)	8
Switzerland (Gruss)	7

Sheet C	Final
Finland (Jokela)	2
United States (Schoeneberg)	12

Sheet D	Final
Canada (Bodogh)	8
Japan (Ishigaki)	3

Sheet E	Final
Sweden (Jörnlind)	5
Germany (Schöpp)	7

== Tiebreaker ==
Sheet A	Final
Scotland (Hay)	3
Norway (Nordby)	11

== Playoffs ==
=== Brackets ===
Semi-final
1	Canada	6
4	Norway	5
2	United States	8
3	Germany	2

Final
1	Canada	5
2	United States	2
Bronze medal
4	Norway	11
3	Germany	5

=== Final ===
Sheet A	1	2	3	4	5	6	7	8	9	10	Final
Canada (Bodogh)	0	0	1	1	0	1	1	0	1	X	5
United States (Schoeneberg)	1	0	0	0	0	0	0	1	0	X	2
