= Jane Hooper-Perroud =

Canadian curler (born c.1962)

- Curler

Team
- Curling club: Barrie CC, Barrie, ON
- Skip: Sherry Middaugh
- Third: Karri-Lee Grant
- Second: Melissa Foster
- Lead: Jane Hooper-Perroud

Curling career
- Member Association: Ontario
- Hearts: 2 (1996, 1997)
- World Championship: 1 (1996)
Medal record
Women's curling
Representing Canada
World Championships
Gold medal – first place	1996 Hamilton
World Senior Championships
Bronze medal – third place	2026 Geneva
Representing Ontario
Scotties Tournament of Hearts
Gold medal – first place	1996 Thunder Bay

Jane Hooper-Perroud (born c. 1962) (also known as Jane Hooper Perroud) is a Canadian curler from Bradford, Ontario.

She is a 1996 World women's champion and 1996 Canadian women's champion.

== Teams and events ==
Season	Skip	Third	Second	Lead	Alternate	Coach	Events
1995–96	Marilyn Bodogh	Kim Gellard	Corie Beveridge	Jane Hooper Perroud	Lisa Savage		STOH 1996 (gold); WCC 1996 (gold)
1996–97	Marilyn Bodogh	Kim Gellard	Corie Beveridge	Jane Hooper Perroud	Lisa Savage	Mary Gellard	STOH 1997 (8th)
1997–98	Marilyn Bodogh	Kim Gellard	Corie Beveridge	Jane Hooper Perroud			COCT 1997 (6th)
2013–14	Marilyn Bodogh	Kathy Chittley-Young	Colleen Madonia	Jane Hooper-Perroud			CSCC 2014 (bronze)
2015–16	Marilyn Bodogh	Colleen Madonia	Christine Loube	Jane Hooper-Perroud			
2017–18	Colleen Madonia	Karri-Lee Grant	Christine Loube	Jane Hooper-Perroud		Larry Snow	CSCC 2018 (bronze)
2018–19	Sherry Middaugh	Karri-Lee Grant	Christine Loube	Jane Hooper-Perroud	Colleen Madonia	Larry Snow	CSCC 2019 (silver)
2021–22	Sherry Middaugh	Karri-Lee Grant	Christine Loube	Jane Hooper-Perroud			CSCC 2021 (6th)
2025–26	Sherry Middaugh	Karri-Lee Grant	Melissa Foster	Jane Hooper-Perroud		Wayne Middaugh	CSCC 2025 (gold)

== Private life ==
Hooper-Perroud is married to fellow curler Canadian curler Pat Perroud, who won Canadian and World championships with Al Hackner (1985) and Ed Werenich (1990).
