= Kim Gellard =

Canadian curler

- Curler
- Other names: Kim Griffin
- Born: November 6, 1974 (age 52)

Team
- Curling club: Unionville CC, Markham; St. Catharines CC, St. Catharines

Curling career
- Member Association: Ontario
- Hearts: 3 (1996, 1997, 1999)
- World Championship: 1 (1996)
- Other appearances: World Junior Championships: 1 (1994)
Medal record
Curling
Representing Canada
World Championships
Gold medal – first place	1996 Hamilton
World Junior Championships
Gold medal – first place	1994 Sofia
Representing Ontario
Scotties Tournament of Hearts
Gold medal – first place	1996 Thunder Bay

Kim Gellard (born November 6, 1974) is a Canadian curler from Unionville, Ontario.

She is a 1996 World women's champion and 1996 Canadian women's champion.

At a Toronto high school curling competition, Gellard skipped a team that scored back-to-back eight-enders. An eight ender is scoring eight points (with all eight rocks) in an end is extremely rare in its own right.

== Awards ==
- Scotties Tournament of Hearts All-Star Team: (1996, third)

== Personal life ==
Gellard is a graduate of Markham District High School. Her uncle is fellow curler Paul Savage. Her mother Mary (née Savage) was her coach at the 1994 World Juniors. Her father Sam played professional ice hockey in the World Hockey Association. Her grandfather played professional soccer in England and served in the British Army during World War II. Gellard attended the University of Western Ontario.

== Teams and events ==
Season	Skip	Third	Second	Lead	Alternate	Coach	Events
1990–91	Deborah Green	Kim Gellard	Lisa Rowsell	Corrine Beveridge			CJCC 1991 (6th)
1991–92	Heather Crockett	Kim Gellard	Johnalee Fraser	Corie Beveridge			CJCC 1992 (bronze)
1992–93	Kim Gellard	Corie Beveridge	Lisa Savage	Sandy Graham			CJCC 1993 (gold)
1993–94	Kim Gellard	Corie Beveridge	Lisa Savage	Sandy Graham	Heather Crockett	Mary Gellard	WJCC 1994 (gold)
1995–96	Marilyn Bodogh	Kim Gellard	Corie Beveridge	Jane Hooper Perroud	Lisa Savage		STOH 1996 (gold); WCC 1996 (gold)
1996–97	Marilyn Bodogh	Kim Gellard	Corie Beveridge	Jane Hooper Perroud	Lisa Savage	Mary Gellard	STOH 1997 (8th)
1997–98	Marilyn Bodogh	Kim Gellard	Corie Beveridge	Jane Hooper Perroud			COCT 1997 (6th)
1998–99	Kim Gellard	Sherry Scheirich	Lisa Savage; Sally Karam	Allison Ross	Mary Gellard		STOH 1999 (9th)
2000–01	Kim Griffin	Mary Chilvers	Sara Garland	Lori Eddy			
2002–03	Anne Merklinger	Kim Griffin	Denna Schell	Kellie Andrews			
