= Jane Margaret Hooper =

- Born: March 11, 1818; London
- Died: June 1907 (aged 88–89); Fulham
- Spouse(s): George Hooper
- Children: Wynnard Hooper

Jane Margaret Hooper (1818 – June 1907) was a British writer, best known for her gothic novel The House of Raby (1854).

Jane Margaret Winnard was born in 1818 in London, daughter of John Winnard, an oilman, and Jane Winnard. In June 1852, she married journalist George Hooper. Their children Wynnard Hooper and Margaret Hooper were close friends with Rudyard Kipling.

In her novel The House of Raby, two lovers cannot marry due to fears of hereditary insanity. Hooper also published the ghost story "Bring Me a Light!" in the magazine Once a Week in 1861.

Jane Margaret Hooper died in June 1907 in Fulham.

== Bibliography ==
- Recollections of Mrs. Anderson's School: A Book for Girls. 1 vol. London: Arthur Hall, 1851.
- Arbell: A Tale for Young People. 1 vol. London: Routledge, 1853.
- The House of Raby: or, Our Lady of Darkness. 3 vol. London: Chapman and Hall, 1854.
- Little Maggie and her Brother: A Sketch for Children. 1 vol. London: Bell and Daldy, 1861.
- Fanny and Arthur: or, Pervevere and Prosper. A Tale of Interest. 1 vol. London: Dean and Son, 1862.
- A Young Man's Love: A Tale. 3 vol. London: Tinsley Brothers, 1873.
- Prince Pertinax: A Fairy Tale. 1 vol. London: Field and Tuer, 1883.
