= 1993 Canadian Junior Curling Championships =

The 1993 Pepsi Canadian Junior Curling Championships were held March 20 to 27, 1993 at the Colisée de Trois-Rivières and Club de curling Laviolette in Trois-Rivieres, Quebec.

Following their win in the men's event, Team Nova Scotia, skipped by Shawn Adams was suspended from competitive curling for the next season for an "off-ice" incident. It was later revealed the team had been drinking at the event, despite a policy against the consumption of alcohol. As a result, the team were not able to represent Canada at the 1994 World Junior Curling Championships.

== Men's ==
=== Teams ===
Province / Territory	Skip	Third	Second	Lead
Ontario	Joe Frans	Daniel Frans	Shane McCready	Mark O'Connor
Quebec	Yannick Paquette	Frederic Marchand	Dany Sauvageau	Christian Sauvageau
Prince Edward Island	Mark Kinney	Andrew MacDougall	Erik Brodersen	Chad MacMillan
Newfoundland	Kenny Young	Marc Stonehouse	Kenneth Langdon	Brian Norman
Saskatchewan	Jeff Wall	Ryan Haight	Rob Markowsky	Jason Field
Alberta	Leslie Sonnenberg	Troy Given	Troy Peterson	Robbie Martin
Manitoba	Mike Mansell	Doug Pottinger	Jason Fuchs	Keith Marshall
New Brunswick	Jason Rice	Kevin Boyle	Spencer Mawhinney	Jeff Lacey
Yukon/Northwest Territories	Robert Andrews	Scot Odian	Alfred Feldman	Allen Shaw
Northern Ontario	Brad Minogue	Greg Cantin	Craig Swayne	Tyler Lockhart
Nova Scotia	Shawn Adams	Ben Blanchard	Jon Philip	Robert MacArthur
British Columbia	Trevor Perepolkin	Brendan Willis	Nathan Munk	David Orme

=== Standings ===
Locale	Skip	W	L
Alberta	Leslie Sonnenberg	7	4
Saskatchewan	Jeff Wall	7	4
Yukon/Northwest Territories	Robert Andrews	7	4
Nova Scotia	Shawn Adams	7	4
Newfoundland	Kenny Young	7	4
Ontario	Joe Frans	6	5
Northern Ontario	Brad Minogue	6	5
Quebec	Yannick Paquette	6	5
Manitoba	Mike Mansell	5	6
New Brunswick	Jason Rice	3	8
British Columbia	Trevor Perepolkin	3	8
Prince Edward Island	Mark Kinney	2	9

=== Results ===
==== Draw 1 ====
Sheet B	1	2	3	4	5	6	7	8	9	10	Final
Ontario (Frans) 🔨	2	1	0	0	1	2	0	1	0	1	8
Manitoba (Mansell)	0	0	0	2	0	0	2	0	2	0	6

Sheet D	1	2	3	4	5	6	7	8	9	10	Final
Quebec (Paquette) 🔨	1	0	0	0	2	0	0	0	0	X	3
New Brunswick (Rice)	0	0	1	2	0	1	1	2	0	X	7

Sheet F	1	2	3	4	5	6	7	8	9	10	Final
Alberta (Sonnenberg) 🔨	2	1	0	1	0	0	1	0	0	1	6
British Columbia (Perepolkin)	0	0	2	0	1	0	0	1	1	0	5

Sheet H	1	2	3	4	5	6	7	8	9	10	Final
Prince Edward Island (Kinney) 🔨	0	0	1	1	0	0	2	0	0	X	4
Newfoundland (Young)	0	0	0	0	5	2	0	1	0	X	8

==== Draw 2 ====
Sheet A	1	2	3	4	5	6	7	8	9	10	Final
Newfoundland (Young) 🔨	0	1	0	0	1	2	0	2	1	X	7
Northern Ontario (Minogue)	0	0	1	0	0	0	2	0	0	X	3

Sheet C	1	2	3	4	5	6	7	8	9	10	Final
Saskatchewan (Wall) 🔨	0	0	1	0	0	1	0	1	0	X	3
Nova Scotia (Adams)	1	1	0	1	1	0	1	0	1	X	6

Sheet E	1	2	3	4	5	6	7	8	9	10	Final
Prince Edward Island (Kinney) 🔨	0	1	0	0	1	0	0	1	0	X	3
Yukon/Northwest Territories (Andrews)	1	0	0	1	0	2	1	0	3	X	8

Sheet G	1	2	3	4	5	6	7	8	9	10	11	Final
Manitoba (Mansell) 🔨	2	0	0	1	0	1	1	0	0	0	1	6
New Brunswick (Rice)	0	0	2	0	2	0	0	0	0	1	0	5

==== Draw 3 ====
Sheet B	1	2	3	4	5	6	7	8	9	10	Final
Yukon/Northwest Territories (Andrews)🔨	0	0	2	0	0	0	0	2	0	0	4
Northern Ontario (Minogue)	0	0	0	1	0	1	2	0	1	1	6

Sheet D	1	2	3	4	5	6	7	8	9	10	Final
Alberta (Sonnenberg) 🔨	1	0	0	3	0	2	1	0	1	X	8
Manitoba (Mansell)	0	2	0	0	3	0	0	6	0	X	11

==== Draw 4 ====
Sheet A	1	2	3	4	5	6	7	8	9	10	Final
Saskatchewan (Wall) 🔨	0	0	3	0	0	2	0	1	0	X	6
Alberta (Sonnenberg)	0	0	0	1	0	0	2	0	1	X	4

Sheet C	1	2	3	4	5	6	7	8	9	10	Final
New Brunswick (Rice) 🔨	1	0	3	0	1	0	0	1	0	2	8
Yukon/Northwest Territories (Andrews)	0	1	0	1	0	2	0	0	0	0	4

Sheet E	1	2	3	4	5	6	7	8	9	10	Final
Ontario (Frans) 🔨	0	2	0	0	0	1	1	1	1	0	6
Quebec (Paquette)	2	0	0	0	2	0	0	0	0	0	4

Sheet G	1	2	3	4	5	6	7	8	9	10	Final
Nova Scotia (Adams) 🔨	0	0	0	1	0	1	0	0	2	0	4
British Columbia (Perepolkin)	0	0	1	0	1	0	3	0	0	1	6

==== Draw 5 ====
Sheet B	1	2	3	4	5	6	7	8	9	10	Final
Northern Ontario (Minogue) 🔨	1	0	0	2	0	0	2	0	2	0	7
Nova Scotia (Adams)	0	0	1	0	2	3	0	1	0	1	8

Sheet D	1	2	3	4	5	6	7	8	9	10	Final
Newfoundland (Young) 🔨	0	0	0	1	0	0	1	0	2	1	5
Saskatchewan (Wall)	0	2	0	0	0	1	0	1	0	0	4

Sheet F	1	2	3	4	5	6	7	8	9	10	11	Final
British Columbia (Perepolkin) 🔨	0	1	0	1	0	0	0	2	2	0	1	7
Ontario (Frans)	0	0	1	0	0	2	1	0	0	2	0	6

Sheet H	1	2	3	4	5	6	7	8	9	10	Final
Quebec (Paquette) 🔨	2	0	0	2	0	2	0	0	1	X	7
Prince Edward Island (Kinney)	0	1	0	0	1	0	0	2	0	X	4

==== Draw 6 ====
Sheet A	1	2	3	4	5	6	7	8	9	10	Final
British Columbia (Perepolkin) 🔨	1	0	0	2	0	0	1	0	1	0	5
Quebec (Paquette)	0	2	0	0	1	1	0	0	0	2	6

Sheet C	1	2	3	4	5	6	7	8	9	10	Final
Newfoundland (Young) 🔨	0	0	0	0	2	0	0	0	2	0	4
Alberta (Sonnenberg)	0	1	0	1	0	1	0	1	0	1	5

Sheet E	1	2	3	4	5	6	7	8	9	10	Final
Nova Scotia (Adams) 🔨	0	0	0	0	0	0	1	1	1	0	3
Ontario (Frans)	0	0	0	0	0	1	0	0	0	1	2

Sheet G	1	2	3	4	5	6	7	8	9	10	Final
Prince Edward Island (Kinney) 🔨	0	1	0	0	0	1	0	0	0	X	2
Saskatchewan (Wall)	0	0	2	0	1	0	0	2	0	X	5

==== Draw 7 ====
Sheet B	1	2	3	4	5	6	7	8	9	10	Final
Yukon/Northwest Territories (Andrews)🔨	1	1	0	0	2	1	1	1	1	X	8
Nova Scotia (Adams)	0	0	2	1	0	0	0	0	0	X	3

Sheet D	1	2	3	4	5	6	7	8	9	10	Final
Ontario (Frans) 🔨	2	0	2	0	1	2	0	1	0	X	8
Prince Edward Island (Kinney)	0	1	0	1	0	0	2	0	2	X	6

Sheet F	1	2	3	4	5	6	7	8	9	10	Final
Saskatchewan (Wall) 🔨	0	1	0	1	0	0	1	0	0	1	4
Manitoba (Mansell)	0	0	1	0	0	1	0	0	1	0	3

Sheet H	1	2	3	4	5	6	7	8	9	10	Final
New Brunswick (Rice) 🔨	1	0	0	1	1	0	0	0	0	1	4
Northern Ontario (Minogue)	0	0	2	0	0	0	0	2	1	0	5

==== Draw 8 ====
Sheet A	1	2	3	4	5	6	7	8	9	10	Final
Manitoba (Mansell) 🔨	1	0	0	0	1	0	0	0	X	X	2
Yukon/Northwest Territories (Andrews)	0	0	0	2	0	2	1	3	X	X	8

Sheet C	1	2	3	4	5	6	7	8	9	10	Final
Northern Ontario (Minogue) 🔨	0	1	0	0	0	1	0	0	2	0	4
British Columbia (Perepolkin)	0	0	0	2	0	0	1	1	0	1	5

Sheet E	1	2	3	4	5	6	7	8	9	10	Final
Quebec (Paquette) 🔨	0	0	1	0	2	0	3	0	1	X	7
Newfoundland (Young)	0	0	0	2	0	0	0	1	0	X	3

Sheet G	1	2	3	4	5	6	7	8	9	10	Final
Alberta (Sonnenberg) 🔨	0	2	0	0	0	0	2	0	0	X	4
New Brunswick (Rice)	0	0	0	1	0	0	0	1	0	X	2

==== Draw 9 ====
Sheet B	1	2	3	4	5	6	7	8	9	10	Final
British Columbia (Perepolkin) 🔨	0	1	0	2	0	2	1	0	1	X	7
Prince Edward Island (Kinney)	1	0	1	0	0	0	0	7	0	X	9

Sheet D	1	2	3	4	5	6	7	8	9	10	11	Final
Northern Ontario (Minogue) 🔨	1	0	0	1	0	2	1	0	1	0	0	6
Ontario (Frans)	0	1	1	0	2	0	0	2	0	0	1	7

Sheet F	1	2	3	4	5	6	7	8	9	10	Final
Nova Scotia (Adams) 🔨	0	0	1	0	3	0	0	0	0	X	4
Quebec (Paquette)	0	0	0	1	0	1	0	0	0	X	2

Sheet H	1	2	3	4	5	6	7	8	9	10	Final
Saskatchewan (Wall) 🔨	0	1	1	1	0	0	0	0	2	X	5
New Brunswick (Rice)	0	0	0	0	0	0	1	0	0	X	1

==== Draw 10 ====
Sheet A	1	2	3	4	5	6	7	8	9	10	Final
Yukon/Northwest Territories (Andrews)🔨	1	0	2	3	0	0	1	1	X	X	8
British Columbia (Perepolkin)	0	1	0	0	0	2	0	0	X	X	3

Sheet C	1	2	3	4	5	6	7	8	9	10	11	Final
Manitoba (Mansell) 🔨	0	0	2	0	0	3	0	0	3	0	0	8
Northern Ontario (Minogue)	0	1	0	1	1	0	2	1	0	2	1	9

Sheet E	1	2	3	4	5	6	7	8	9	10	Final
Prince Edward Island (Kinney) 🔨	0	0	1	0	1	0	0	0	2	0	4
Alberta (Sonnenberg)	1	0	0	2	0	0	1	0	0	1	5

Sheet G	1	2	3	4	5	6	7	8	9	10	Final
Ontario (Frans) 🔨	0	0	0	1	0	1	0	0	0	1	3
Newfoundland (Young)	0	0	2	0	2	0	0	0	0	0	4

==== Draw 11 ====
Sheet B	1	2	3	4	5	6	7	8	9	10	Final
Quebec (Paquette) 🔨	1	0	0	0	0	0	2	0	2	X	5
Saskatchewan (Wall)	0	1	0	0	0	0	0	1	0	X	2

Sheet D	1	2	3	4	5	6	7	8	9	10	11	Final
Alberta (Sonnenberg) 🔨	0	0	0	0	1	0	1	2	0	1	1	6
Yukon/Northwest Territories (Andrews)	1	0	1	1	0	1	0	0	1	0	0	5

Sheet F	1	2	3	4	5	6	7	8	9	10	Final
New Brunswick (Rice) 🔨	0	1	0	0	1	0	0	0	1	0	3
Nova Scotia (Adams)	0	0	1	0	0	2	0	0	0	1	4

Sheet H	1	2	3	4	5	6	7	8	9	10	Final
Newfoundland (Young) 🔨	1	0	0	0	1	0	2	1	0	1	6
Manitoba (Mansell)	0	1	1	0	0	1	0	0	1	0	4

==== Draw 12 ====
Sheet A	1	2	3	4	5	6	7	8	9	10	Final
Newfoundland (Young) 🔨	2	0	2	1	0	0	0	3	0	X	8
New Brunswick (Rice)	0	1	0	0	0	1	2	0	2	X	6

Sheet C	1	2	3	4	5	6	7	8	9	10	Final
Prince Edward Island (Kinney) 🔨	0	0	0	2	1	1	1	0	1	X	6
Manitoba (Mansell)	1	2	2	0	0	0	0	4	0	X	9

Sheet E	1	2	3	4	5	6	7	8	9	10	11	Final
Saskatchewan (Wall) 🔨	1	0	0	1	0	1	1	0	2	0	1	7
Yukon/Northwest Territories (Andrews)	0	1	0	0	2	0	0	1	0	2	0	6

Sheet G	1	2	3	4	5	6	7	8	9	10	Final
Northern Ontario (Minogue) 🔨	2	0	0	0	1	0	1	0	1	X	5
Quebec (Paquette)	0	1	0	0	0	2	0	0	0	X	3

==== Draw 13 ====
Sheet B	1	2	3	4	5	6	7	8	9	10	Final
Ontario (Frans) 🔨	0	1	0	1	0	0	0	0	0	X	2
Saskatchewan (Wall)	0	0	3	0	1	0	2	0	0	X	6

Sheet D	1	2	3	4	5	6	7	8	9	10	Final
Manitoba (Mansell) 🔨	2	0	2	0	2	0	0	0	1	X	7
Nova Scotia (Adams)	0	2	0	1	0	1	1	0	0	X	5

Sheet F	1	2	3	4	5	6	7	8	9	10	Final
Quebec (Paquette) 🔨	1	0	2	0	0	0	2	0	0	2	7
Alberta (Sonnenberg)	0	1	0	1	1	1	0	2	0	0	6

Sheet H	1	2	3	4	5	6	7	8	9	10	Final
British Columbia (Perepolkin) 🔨	0	0	0	0	0	0	X	X	X	X	0
Newfoundland (Young)	0	1	1	1	1	2	X	X	X	X	6

==== Draw 14 ====
Sheet A	1	2	3	4	5	6	7	8	9	10	Final
Alberta (Sonnenberg) 🔨	0	1	0	2	0	2	0	0	1	X	6
Northern Ontario (Minogue)	1	0	1	0	0	0	0	1	0	X	3

Sheet C	1	2	3	4	5	6	7	8	9	10	11	Final
Yukon/Northwest Territories (Andrews)🔨	1	0	2	0	2	0	0	0	2	0	1	8
Ontario (Frans)	0	0	0	1	0	1	2	1	0	2	0	7

Sheet E	1	2	3	4	5	6	7	8	9	10	Final
New Brunswick (Rice) 🔨	2	0	0	2	2	0	0	2	1	X	9
British Columbia (Perepolkin)	0	0	3	0	0	1	0	0	0	X	4

Sheet G	1	2	3	4	5	6	7	8	9	10	Final
Nova Scotia (Adams) 🔨	2	0	1	0	2	1	1	0	X	X	7
Prince Edward Island (Kinney)	0	0	0	0	0	0	0	1	X	X	1

==== Draw 15 ====
Sheet B	1	2	3	4	5	6	7	8	9	10	Final
Manitoba (Mansell) 🔨	0	1	4	0	0	0	1	0	0	X	6
British Columbia (Perepolkin)	0	0	0	1	1	0	0	1	0	X	3

Sheet D	1	2	3	4	5	6	7	8	9	10	Final
New Brunswick (Rice) 🔨	0	0	1	0	0	0	1	0	1	0	3
Ontario (Frans)	0	0	0	1	0	2	0	1	0	0	4

Sheet F	1	2	3	4	5	6	7	8	9	10	11	Final
Newfoundland (Young) 🔨	0	0	0	1	2	0	2	0	1	0	0	6
Yukon/Northwest Territories (Andrews)	0	0	1	0	0	2	0	1	0	2	1	7

Sheet H	1	2	3	4	5	6	7	8	9	10	Final
Alberta (Sonnenberg) 🔨	0	2	2	0	0	1	0	0	0	X	5
Nova Scotia (Adams)	0	0	0	1	0	0	0	1	0	X	2

==== Draw 16 ====
Sheet A	1	2	3	4	5	6	7	8	9	10	11	Final
Prince Edward Island (Kinney) 🔨	1	0	2	0	0	1	0	3	0	0	2	9
New Brunswick (Rice)	0	2	0	1	1	0	2	0	0	1	0	7

Sheet C	1	2	3	4	5	6	7	8	9	10	Final
Nova Scotia (Adams) 🔨	3	0	3	0	1	0	1	0	X	X	8
Newfoundland (Young)	0	1	0	2	0	1	0	1	X	X	5

Sheet E	1	2	3	4	5	6	7	8	9	10	Final
Saskatchewan (Wall) 🔨	1	1	0	0	0	0	1	0	1	0	4
Northern Ontario (Minogue)	0	0	2	0	0	1	0	1	0	2	6

Sheet G	1	2	3	4	5	6	7	8	9	10	Final
Yukon/Northwest Territories (Andrews)🔨	0	2	0	1	0	0	2	1	0	1	7
Quebec (Paquette)	1	0	1	0	1	0	0	0	2	0	5

==== Draw 17 ====
Sheet B	1	2	3	4	5	6	7	8	9	10	Final
Quebec (Paquette) 🔨	1	0	0	0	0	0	0	0	2	X	3
Manitoba (Mansell)	0	0	0	0	0	0	0	1	0	X	1

Sheet D	1	2	3	4	5	6	7	8	9	10	Final
British Columbia (Perepolkin) 🔨	1	0	2	0	1	0	1	0	0	X	5
Saskatchewan (Wall)	0	2	0	2	0	1	0	0	2	X	7

Sheet F	1	2	3	4	5	6	7	8	9	10	Final
Northern Ontario (Minogue) 🔨	1	0	2	0	2	0	1	0	0	X	6
Prince Edward Island (Kinney)	0	0	0	1	0	1	0	0	1	X	3

Sheet H	1	2	3	4	5	6	7	8	9	10	Final
Ontario (Frans) 🔨	3	0	1	0	0	1	0	2	0	X	7
Alberta (Sonnenberg)	0	2	0	0	1	0	0	0	1	X	4

=== Playoffs ===
Tiebreaker
5	Newfoundland	4
4	Saskatchewan	6

Semifinal
1	Alberta	5
4	Saskatchewan	6
3	Nova Scotia	7
2	Yukon/Northwest Territories	5

Final
3	Nova Scotia	9
4	Saskatchewan	2

==== Tiebreaker ====
Sheet B	1	2	3	4	5	6	7	8	9	10	Final
Newfoundland (Young) 🔨	0	3	0	0	1	0	0	0	0	X	4
Saskatchewan (Wall)	1	0	2	1	0	2	0	0	0	X	6

Player percentages
Newfoundland		Saskatchewan	
Brian Norman	90%	Jason Field	100%
Kenneth Langdon	94%	Rob Markowsky	85%
Marc Stonehouse	88%	Ryan Haight	78%
Kenny Young	75%	Jeff Wall	93%
Total	87%	Total	88%

==== Semifinals ====
Sheet A	1	2	3	4	5	6	7	8	9	10	Final
Nova Scotia (Adams)	0	1	0	0	2	0	3	0	0	1	7
Yukon/Northwest Territories (Andrews)🔨	1	0	1	1	0	1	0	1	0	0	5

Player percentages
Nova Scotia		Northwest Territories/Yukon	
Robert MacArthur	88%	Allen Shaw	49%
Jon Philip	63%	Alfred Feldman	76%
Ben Blanchard	61%	Scott Odian	54%
Shawn Adams	78%	Robert Andrews	60%
Total	72%	Total	60%

Sheet C	1	2	3	4	5	6	7	8	9	10	11	Final
Alberta (Sonnenberg)	0	1	0	1	0	1	1	0	0	1	0	5
Saskatchewan (Wall) 🔨	2	0	1	0	1	0	0	1	0	0	1	6

Player percentages
Alberta		Saskatchewan	
Robbie Martin	83%	Jason Field	75%
Troy Peterson	86%	Rob Markowsky	85%
Troy Given	76%	Ryan Haight	82%
Leslie Sonnenberg	69%	Jeff Wall	67%
Total	79%	Total	77%

==== Final ====
Sheet B	1	2	3	4	5	6	7	8	9	10	Final
Nova Scotia (Adams) 🔨	0	1	0	2	2	3	0	1	X	X	9
Saskatchewan (Wall)	0	0	1	0	0	0	1	0	X	X	2

Player percentages
Nova Scotia		Saskatchewan	
Robert MacArthur	57%	Jason Field	89%
Jon Philip	95%	Rob Markowsky	73%
Ben Blanchard	80%	Ryan Haight	84%
Shawn Adams	97%	Jeff Wall	64%
Total	83%	Total	78%

== Women's ==
=== Teams ===
Province / Territory	Skip	Third	Second	Lead
British Columbia	Patti Thompson	Laurie Pratt	Kim Winkel	Tracey Martin
Nova Scotia	Jackie-Lee Myra	Melanie Comstock	Heidi Tanner	Sara Jane Rawding
Newfoundland	Gina Stanley	Michelle Letto	Carla Avery	Kerri Hartley
Northwest Territories/Yukon	Tara Hamer	Kerry Koe	Kim Barraclough	Sheena Yakeleya
New Brunswick	Elizabeth Toner	Cindy O'Regan	Michelle Latour	Cindy Toner
Quebec	Janique Berthelot	Jessica Marchand	Annie Cadorette	Carolyne Sanschagrin
Alberta	Irene Chamczuk	Carmen Whyte	Holly Bobier	Shannon Bredin
Manitoba	Jennifer Jones	Trisha Baldwin	Jill Officer	Dana Malanchuk
Prince Edward Island	Angela Sutherland	Lisa MacRae	Jennifer Coaty	Melinda Kinney
Saskatchewan	Sherry Linton	Shari Pagan	Shannon Linton	Renelle Merkley
Northern Ontario	Kara Thib	Kim Shortt	Kim McDonald	Alex Pollock
Ontario	Kim Gellard	Corie Beveridge	Lisa Savage	Sandy Graham

=== Standings ===
Locale	Skip	W	L
Ontario	Kim Gellard	10	1
British Columbia	Patti Thompson	9	2
Nova Scotia	Jackie-Lee Myra	8	3
Quebec	Janique Berthelot	8	3
Manitoba	Jennifer Jones	8	3
Alberta	Irene Chamczuk	6	5
New Brunswick	Elizabeth Toner	5	6
Saskatchewan	Sherry Linton	5	6
Newfoundland	Gina Stanley	3	8
Northwest Territories/Yukon	Tara Hamer	2	9
Prince Edward Island	Angela Sutherland	1	10
Northern Ontario	Kara Thib	1	10

=== Results ===
==== Draw 1 ====
Sheet A	1	2	3	4	5	6	7	8	9	10	Final
Newfoundland (Stanley) 🔨	1	0	0	2	0	6	0	0	0	1	10
Northwest Territories/Yukon (Hamer)	0	2	1	0	1	0	2	2	0	0	8

Sheet C	1	2	3	4	5	6	7	8	9	10	Final
Quebec (Berthelot) 🔨	0	0	2	0	2	0	0	0	0	1	5
Ontario (Gellard)	0	0	0	2	0	2	1	0	1	0	6

Sheet E	1	2	3	4	5	6	7	8	9	10	Final
Nova Scotia (Myra) 🔨	1	0	0	0	0	0	1	1	0	X	3
Manitoba (Jones)	0	1	0	0	0	0	0	0	1	X	2

Sheet G	1	2	3	4	5	6	7	8	9	10	Final
British Columbia (Thompson) 🔨	1	3	1	0	3	0	2	2	X	X	12
Alberta (Chamczuk)	0	0	0	1	0	2	0	0	X	X	3

==== Draw 2 ====
Sheet B	1	2	3	4	5	6	7	8	9	10	Final
Alberta (Chamczuk) 🔨	0	1	0	0	0	0	0	X	X	X	1
Manitoba (Jones)	0	0	2	1	3	2	5	X	X	X	13

Sheet D	1	2	3	4	5	6	7	8	9	10	Final
Newfoundland (Stanley) 🔨	1	1	0	1	1	1	0	1	1	X	7
Prince Edward Island (Sutherland)	0	0	1	0	0	0	1	0	0	X	2

Sheet F	1	2	3	4	5	6	7	8	9	10	Final
New Brunswick (Toner) 🔨	1	1	0	1	2	0	1	1	0	3	10
Northern Ontario (Thib)	0	0	2	0	0	1	0	0	1	0	4

Sheet H	1	2	3	4	5	6	7	8	9	10	Final
Northwest Territories/Yukon (Hamer) 🔨	0	0	0	1	0	0	1	0	0	0	2
Saskatchewan (Linton)	1	0	0	0	0	2	0	1	0	0	4

==== Draw 3 ====
Sheet A	1	2	3	4	5	6	7	8	9	10	Final
Quebec (Berthelot) 🔨	2	0	0	0	3	1	1	0	4	X	11
Alberta (Chamczuk)	0	0	0	1	0	0	0	1	0	X	2

Sheet C	1	2	3	4	5	6	7	8	9	10	Final
Prince Edward Island (Sutherland) 🔨	0	0	1	0	0	1	1	0	0	X	3
Saskatchewan (Linton)	1	2	0	2	2	0	0	0	2	X	9

==== Draw 4 ====
Sheet B	1	2	3	4	5	6	7	8	9	10	Final
Northern Ontario (Thib) 🔨	4	0	1	0	1	0	1	0	1	0	8
Ontario (Gellard)	0	1	0	2	0	4	0	1	0	1	9

Sheet D	1	2	3	4	5	6	7	8	9	10	Final
British Columbia (Thompson) 🔨	2	0	2	0	2	0	3	X	X	X	9
Nova Scotia (Myra)	0	0	0	1	0	0	0	X	X	X	1

Sheet F	1	2	3	4	5	6	7	8	9	10	Final
Manitoba (Jones) 🔨	2	1	0	1	1	1	1	0	4	X	11
Prince Edward Island (Sutherland)	0	0	1	0	0	0	0	2	0	X	3

Sheet H	1	2	3	4	5	6	7	8	9	10	Final
New Brunswick (Toner) 🔨	1	0	0	0	2	0	1	1	1	0	6
Quebec (Berthelot)	0	0	2	0	0	3	0	0	0	2	7

==== Draw 5 ====
Sheet A	1	2	3	4	5	6	7	8	9	10	11	Final
Nova Scotia (Myra) 🔨	0	0	0	2	0	2	0	1	0	0	1	6
Newfoundland (Stanley)	1	1	0	0	0	0	1	0	1	1	0	5

Sheet C	1	2	3	4	5	6	7	8	9	10	Final
Ontario (Gellard) 🔨	0	3	0	2	0	3	0	1	1	X	10
British Columbia (Thompson)	0	0	1	0	2	0	1	0	0	X	4

Sheet E	1	2	3	4	5	6	7	8	9	10	Final
Northwest Territories/Yukon (Hamer) 🔨	0	0	1	0	1	0	0	0	X	X	2
New Brunswick (Toner)	1	2	0	3	0	1	1	1	X	X	9

Sheet G	1	2	3	4	5	6	7	8	9	10	Final
Saskatchewan (Linton) 🔨	1	0	0	0	4	0	0	0	2	X	7
Northern Ontario (Thib)	0	0	2	0	0	1	1	0	0	X	4

==== Draw 6 ====
Sheet B	1	2	3	4	5	6	7	8	9	10	Final
Newfoundland (Stanley) 🔨	0	0	0	0	0	0	0	X	X	X	0
New Brunswick (Toner)	0	2	0	2	1	0	3	X	X	X	8

Sheet D	1	2	3	4	5	6	7	8	9	10	Final
Northern Ontario (Thib) 🔨	1	0	1	0	1	0	1	1	0	0	5
British Columbia (Thompson)	0	1	0	3	0	1	0	0	0	1	6

Sheet F	1	2	3	4	5	6	7	8	9	10	Final
Northwest Territories/Yukon (Hamer) 🔨	1	0	0	1	0	1	0	X	X	X	3
Quebec (Berthelot)	0	3	1	0	3	0	2	X	X	X	9

Sheet H	1	2	3	4	5	6	7	8	9	10	Final
Ontario (Gellard) 🔨	1	0	0	4	1	0	0	1	0	X	7
Nova Scotia (Myra)	0	1	0	0	0	1	1	0	1	X	4

==== Draw 7 ====
Sheet A	1	2	3	4	5	6	7	8	9	10	Final
Manitoba (Jones) 🔨	1	0	0	0	0	1	0	2	0	X	4
Saskatchewan (Linton)	0	0	1	1	1	0	2	0	3	X	8

Sheet C	1	2	3	4	5	6	7	8	9	10	Final
New Brunswick (Toner) 🔨	2	1	0	0	4	1	0	0	0	0	8
Alberta (Chamczuk)	0	0	0	1	0	0	3	1	3	1	9

Sheet E	1	2	3	4	5	6	7	8	9	10	Final
British Columbia (Thompson) 🔨	2	0	1	1	2	0	1	4	X	X	11
Newfoundland (Stanley)	0	1	0	0	0	1	0	0	X	X	2

Sheet G	1	2	3	4	5	6	7	8	9	10	11	Final
Prince Edward Island (Sutherland) 🔨	1	0	0	1	1	0	1	1	0	0	1	6
Northern Ontario (Thib)	0	1	3	0	0	0	0	0	0	1	0	5

==== Draw 8 ====
Sheet B	1	2	3	4	5	6	7	8	9	10	Final
Quebec (Berthelot) 🔨	0	0	1	1	0	2	1	0	0	X	5
Manitoba (Jones)	0	0	0	0	1	0	0	0	2	X	3

Sheet D	1	2	3	4	5	6	7	8	9	10	Final
Nova Scotia (Myra) 🔨	2	0	1	0	2	1	0	1	0	1	8
Northwest Territories/Yukon (Hamer)	0	0	0	2	0	0	1	0	1	0	4

Sheet F	1	2	3	4	5	6	7	8	9	10	Final
Saskatchewan (Linton) 🔨	0	1	0	0	1	0	2	0	0	0	4
Ontario (Gellard)	1	0	0	2	0	1	0	0	2	1	7

Sheet H	1	2	3	4	5	6	7	8	9	10	Final
Alberta (Chamczuk) 🔨	2	1	1	1	1	0	0	1	1	X	8
Prince Edward Island (Sutherland)	0	0	0	0	0	0	1	0	0	X	1

==== Draw 9 ====
Sheet A	1	2	3	4	5	6	7	8	9	10	Final
New Brunswick (Toner) 🔨	1	0	0	0	0	1	1	2	0	X	5
Manitoba (Jones)	0	2	1	2	2	0	0	0	3	X	10

Sheet C	1	2	3	4	5	6	7	8	9	10	Final
Northern Ontario (Thib) 🔨	1	0	0	1	1	0	1	0	1	X	5
Nova Scotia (Myra)	0	2	1	0	0	3	0	3	0	X	9

Sheet E	1	2	3	4	5	6	7	8	9	10	Final
Saskatchewan (Linton) 🔨	1	0	1	0	0	0	0	1	0	X	3
British Columbia (Thompson)	0	0	0	2	0	0	2	0	2	X	6

Sheet G	1	2	3	4	5	6	7	8	9	10	Final
Ontario (Gellard) 🔨	1	0	0	1	1	0	1	1	0	0	5
Newfoundland (Stanley)	0	1	1	0	0	1	0	0	1	0	4

==== Draw 10 ====
Sheet B	1	2	3	4	5	6	7	8	9	10	Final
British Columbia (Thompson) 🔨	3	1	0	1	0	1	0	0	1	X	7
Northwest Territories/Yukon (Hamer)	0	0	2	0	1	0	0	1	0	X	4

Sheet D	1	2	3	4	5	6	7	8	9	10	Final
Newfoundland (Stanley) 🔨	1	0	0	0	0	1	0	2	0	X	4
Quebec (Berthelot)	0	0	1	0	1	0	2	0	2	X	6

Sheet F	1	2	3	4	5	6	7	8	9	10	Final
Alberta (Chamczuk) 🔨	0	1	0	0	2	1	0	2	0	1	7
Saskatchewan (Linton)	1	0	0	0	0	0	3	0	2	0	6

Sheet H	1	2	3	4	5	6	7	8	9	10	Final
Prince Edward Island (Sutherland) 🔨	0	0	0	0	1	0	0	0	X	X	1
Ontario (Gellard)	2	0	0	1	0	3	1	1	X	X	8

==== Draw 11 ====
Sheet A	1	2	3	4	5	6	7	8	9	10	Final
Northwest Territories/Yukon (Hamer) 🔨	0	2	0	1	0	1	0	2	0	0	6
Alberta (Chamczuk)	1	0	1	0	1	0	2	0	2	2	9

Sheet C	1	2	3	4	5	6	7	8	9	10	Final
Manitoba (Jones) 🔨	1	2	1	0	1	1	0	2	X	X	8
Northern Ontario (Thib)	0	0	0	1	0	0	1	0	X	X	2

Sheet E	1	2	3	4	5	6	7	8	9	10	Final
Quebec (Berthelot) 🔨	1	0	2	1	0	4	0	2	0	0	10
Prince Edward Island (Sutherland)	0	2	0	0	2	0	1	0	2	1	8

Sheet G	1	2	3	4	5	6	7	8	9	10	Final
Nova Scotia (Myra) 🔨	0	2	2	3	0	2	1	X	X	X	10
New Brunswick (Toner)	1	0	0	0	1	0	0	X	X	X	2

==== Draw 12 ====
Sheet B	1	2	3	4	5	6	7	8	9	10	Final
Saskatchewan (Linton) 🔨	0	0	2	0	0	0	0	X	X	X	2
Nova Scotia (Myra)	0	2	0	1	1	1	4	X	X	X	9

Sheet D	1	2	3	4	5	6	7	8	9	10	Final
New Brunswick (Toner) 🔨	3	0	2	0	3	1	0	1	X	X	10
Prince Edward Island (Sutherland)	0	1	0	1	0	0	1	0	X	X	3

Sheet F	1	2	3	4	5	6	7	8	9	10	Final
Newfoundland (Stanley) 🔨	1	0	2	0	0	1	0	0	1	X	5
Alberta (Chamczuk)	0	1	0	1	0	0	0	0	0	X	2

Sheet H	1	2	3	4	5	6	7	8	9	10	Final
Northwest Territories/Yukon (Hamer) 🔨	0	0	0	0	0	0	0	1	1	X	2
Manitoba (Jones)	0	0	0	1	2	0	1	0	0	X	4

==== Draw 13 ====
Sheet A	1	2	3	4	5	6	7	8	9	10	Final
Ontario (Gellard) 🔨	5	3	0	1	1	X	X	X	X	X	10
Northwest Territories/Yukon (Hamer)	0	0	0	0	0	X	X	X	X	X	0

Sheet C	1	2	3	4	5	6	7	8	9	10	Final
Nova Scotia (Myra) 🔨	0	1	0	0	0	1	1	1	0	2	6
Quebec (Berthelot)	1	0	0	0	2	0	0	0	2	0	5

Sheet E	1	2	3	4	5	6	7	8	9	10	Final
Alberta (Chamczuk) 🔨	1	1	0	0	0	1	1	0	1	1	6
Northern Ontario (Thib)	0	0	1	1	1	0	0	1	0	0	4

Sheet G	1	2	3	4	5	6	7	8	9	10	Final
British Columbia (Thompson) 🔨	0	0	0	2	2	0	0	0	1	X	5
New Brunswick (Toner)	0	0	0	0	0	0	0	1	0	X	1

==== Draw 14 ====
Sheet B	1	2	3	4	5	6	7	8	9	10	Final
Northern Ontario (Thib) 🔨	0	1	0	0	1	0	1	2	1	X	6
Newfoundland (Stanley)	0	0	0	1	0	1	0	0	0	X	2

Sheet D	1	2	3	4	5	6	7	8	9	10	Final
Manitoba (Jones) 🔨	0	2	0	1	1	0	0	1	0	1	6
Ontario (Gellard)	1	0	1	0	0	0	2	0	1	0	5

Sheet F	1	2	3	4	5	6	7	8	9	10	Final
Prince Edward Island (Sutherland) 🔨	0	0	0	0	0	1	0	1	0	X	2
British Columbia (Thompson)	1	2	0	1	0	0	2	0	1	X	7

Sheet H	1	2	3	4	5	6	7	8	9	10	Final
Quebec (Berthelot) 🔨	1	1	0	0	1	0	1	0	0	1	5
Saskatchewan (Linton)	0	0	1	0	0	2	0	1	0	0	4

==== Draw 15 ====
Sheet A	1	2	3	4	5	6	7	8	9	10	Final
Quebec (Berthelot) 🔨	1	0	0	0	2	0	0	0	2	X	5
Northern Ontario (Thib)	0	0	0	1	0	1	1	0	0	X	3

Sheet C	1	2	3	4	5	6	7	8	9	10	Final
Northwest Territories/Yukon (Hamer) 🔨	1	1	1	0	3	0	1	0	2	X	9
Prince Edward Island (Sutherland)	0	0	0	1	0	1	0	1	0	X	3

Sheet E	1	2	3	4	5	6	7	8	9	10	Final
Manitoba (Jones) 🔨	1	0	0	1	0	3	0	1	0	1	7
British Columbia (Thompson)	0	0	2	0	1	0	1	0	2	0	6

Sheet G	1	2	3	4	5	6	7	8	9	10	Final
Alberta (Chamczuk) 🔨	2	0	0	1	0	1	1	0	1	0	6
Ontario (Gellard)	0	0	1	0	2	0	0	3	0	1	7

==== Draw 16 ====
Sheet B	1	2	3	4	5	6	7	8	9	10	Final
Prince Edward Island (Sutherland) 🔨	0	0	2	0	1	0	2	0	1	X	6
Nova Scotia (Myra)	2	0	0	1	0	3	0	4	0	X	10

Sheet D	1	2	3	4	5	6	7	8	9	10	Final
New Brunswick (Toner) 🔨	2	0	1	1	0	0	0	0	0	2	6
Saskatchewan (Linton)	0	0	0	0	1	1	1	1	1	0	5

Sheet F	1	2	3	4	5	6	7	8	9	10	Final
Northern Ontario (Thib) 🔨	0	3	0	0	0	1	0	0	0	0	4
Northwest Territories/Yukon (Hamer)	0	0	0	2	1	0	0	0	2	0	5

Sheet H	1	2	3	4	5	6	7	8	9	10	Final
Newfoundland (Stanley) 🔨	0	1	0	1	0	1	0	0	1	0	4
Manitoba (Jones)	0	0	2	0	1	0	0	1	0	1	5

==== Draw 17 ====
Sheet A	1	2	3	4	5	6	7	8	9	10	Final
British Columbia (Thompson) 🔨	2	0	0	0	1	0	0	4	0	0	7
Quebec (Berthelot)	0	0	0	1	0	0	2	0	1	1	5

Sheet C	1	2	3	4	5	6	7	8	9	10	Final
Saskatchewan (Linton) 🔨	1	0	1	0	0	1	0	1	1	2	7
Newfoundland (Stanley)	0	1	0	0	1	0	3	0	0	0	5

Sheet E	1	2	3	4	5	6	7	8	9	10	Final
Ontario (Gellard) 🔨	1	0	0	0	2	0	0	3	0	2	8
New Brunswick (Toner)	0	0	1	0	0	0	2	0	2	0	5

Sheet G	1	2	3	4	5	6	7	8	9	10	Final
Nova Scotia (Myra) 🔨	3	0	2	1	0	0	0	0	1	X	7
Alberta (Chamczuk)	0	0	0	0	3	2	1	3	0	X	9

=== Playoffs ===
Tiebreaker #1
Quebec	6
Manitoba	3

Tiebreaker #2
Nova Scotia	5
Quebec	7

Semifinal
British Columbia	5
Quebec	9

Final
Quebec	6
Ontario	7

==== Tiebreaker #1 ====
Sheet B	1	2	3	4	5	6	7	8	9	10	Final
Quebec (Berthelot) 🔨	1	0	0	1	1	1	0	2	0	X	6
Manitoba (Jones)	0	1	0	0	0	0	1	0	1	X	3

Player percentages
Quebec		Manitoba	
Carolyne Sanschagrin	66%	Dana Malanchuk	80%
Annie Cadorette	73%	Jill Officer	85%
Jessica Marchand	70%	Trisha Baldwin	69%
Janique Berthelot	83%	Jennifer Jones	68%
Total	73%	Total	76%

==== Tiebreaker #2 ====
Sheet C	1	2	3	4	5	6	7	8	9	10	Final
Nova Scotia (Myra) 🔨	0	1	0	2	1	0	0	1	0	X	5
Quebec (Berthelot)	0	0	2	0	0	2	1	0	2	X	7

Player percentages
Nova Scotia		Quebec	
Sara Jane Rawding	71%	Carolyne Sanschagrin	87%
Heidi Tanner	80%	Annie Cadorette	76%
Melanie Comstock	66%	Jessica Marchand	70%
Jackie-Lee Myra	63%	Janique Berthelot	73%
Total	70%	Total	76%

==== Semifinal ====
Sheet B	1	2	3	4	5	6	7	8	9	10	Final
British Columbia (Thompson) 🔨	2	0	0	0	0	0	2	1	0	X	5
Quebec (Berthelot)	0	0	4	2	1	1	0	0	1	X	9

Player percentages
British Columbia		Quebec	
Tracey Martin	63%	Carolyne Sanschagrin	85%
Kim Winkel	76%	Annie Cadorette	66%
Laurie Pratt	70%	Jessica Marchand	85%
Patti Thompson	68%	Janique Berthelot	86%
Total	69%	Total	80%

==== Final ====
Sheet C	1	2	3	4	5	6	7	8	9	10	11	Final
Quebec (Berthelot)	0	0	2	0	1	0	0	2	0	1	0	6
Ontario (Gellard) 🔨	0	1	0	1	0	0	1	0	3	0	1	7

Player percentages
Quebec		Ontario	
Carolyne Sanschagrin	86%	Sandy Graham	67%
Annie Cadorette	74%	Lisa Savage	65%
Jessica Marchand	76%	Corie Beveridge	72%
Janique Berthelot	78%	Kim Gellard	73%
Total	79%	Total	69%

== Qualification ==
=== Ontario ===
The Ontario Junior Curling Championships were held in Port Elgin, Ontario, with the finals held on February 28.

St. Catharines' Joe Frans defeated Terry Bowser of Peterborough 7–6 in the men's final. Frans defeated Greg Richardson of Ottawa's Rideau Club in the semifinal, while Bowser earned a bye to the final.

Unionville's Kim Gellard won the women's championship, beating Traci Bloomfield of Port Perry 12–1. Bloomfield beat Heidi Bishop of Brampton's Chinguacousy Club in the semifinal.
