= 2013 Newfoundland and Labrador Tankard =

- Host city: St. John's, Newfoundland and Labrador
- Arena: RE/MAX Centre
- Dates: February 5–10
- Winner: Brad Gushue
- Curling club: Bally Haly G&CC, St. John's
- Skip: Brad Gushue
- Third: Adam Casey
- Second: Brett Gallant
- Lead: Geoff Walker
- Finalist: Colin Thomas

The 2013 Newfoundland and Labrador Tankard, the men's provincial curling championship for Newfoundland and Labrador, was held from February 5 to 10 at the RE/MAX Centre in St. John's, Newfoundland and Labrador. The winning team of Brad Gushue represented Newfoundland and Labrador at the 2013 Tim Hortons Brier in Edmonton, Alberta.

== Teams ==
| Skip | Vice | Second | Lead | Alternate | Club |
|---|---|---|---|---|---|
| Shawn Adams | Rick Rowsell | Randy Turpin | Craig Dowden | Jamie Korab | St. John's Curling Club, St. John's |
| Colin Thomas | Cory Schuh | Chris Ford | Spencer Wicks | | St. John's Curling Club, St. John's |
| Jeff Thomas | Lorne Henderson | Paul Harvey | Wayne Young | | St. John's Curling Club, St. John's |
| Brad Gushue | Adam Casey | Brett Gallant | Geoff Walker | | Bally Haly Golf & Curling Club, St. John's |
| Ken Peddigrew | Dave Noftall | Jeff Rose | Keith Jewer | | St. John's Curling Club, St. John's |
| Andrew Symonds | Mark Healy | Cory Ewart | Jamie Danbrook | | St. John's Curling Club, St. John's |
| Brian Mercer | Kirk Foster | Jody Wentzell | Jonathan Brenton | | Carol Curling Club, Labrador City |
| Keith Ryan | Mike Ryan | Cory Hennessy | Dennis Langdon | | Carol Curling Club, Labrador City |

== Standings ==
| Skip (Club) | W | L | T* | PF | PA |
|---|---|---|---|---|---|
| Brad Gushue (Bally Haly) | 7 | 0 | 0 | 55 | 28 |
| Colin Thomas (St. John's) | 6 | 1 | 0 | 55 | 30 |
| Andrew Symonds (St. John's) | 5 | 2 | 0 | 52 | 39 |
| Jeff Thomas (St. John's) | 4 | 3 | 0 | 43 | 42 |
| Shawn Adams (St. John's) | 3 | 4 | 0 | 46 | 46 |
| Ken Peddigrew (St. John's) | 2 | 5 | 0 | 35 | 37 |
| Keith Ryan (Carol) | 0 | 6 | 1 | 31 | 52 |
| Brian Mercer (Carol) | 0 | 6 | 1 | 20 | 63 |

*One game was allowed to result in a tie.

== Round-robin results ==
All draw times are listed in Newfoundland Standard Time (UTC−3:30).

=== Draw 1 ===
Tuesday, February 5, 7:00 pm

| Team | 1 | 2 | 3 | 4 | 5 | 6 | 7 | 8 | 9 | 10 | Final |
|---|---|---|---|---|---|---|---|---|---|---|---|
| Adams | 0 | 2 | 1 | 0 | 2 | 0 | 3 | 0 | 1 | X | 9 |
| Mercer | 1 | 0 | 0 | 1 | 0 | 1 | 0 | 1 | 0 | X | 4 |

| Team | 1 | 2 | 3 | 4 | 5 | 6 | 7 | 8 | 9 | 10 | Final |
|---|---|---|---|---|---|---|---|---|---|---|---|
| Ryan | 0 | 1 | 0 | 2 | 0 | 0 | 0 | 0 | 2 | 0 | 5 |
| Symonds | 1 | 0 | 1 | 0 | 0 | 2 | 0 | 2 | 0 | 1 | 7 |

| Team | 1 | 2 | 3 | 4 | 5 | 6 | 7 | 8 | 9 | 10 | Final |
|---|---|---|---|---|---|---|---|---|---|---|---|
| J. Thomas | 2 | 0 | 0 | 0 | 1 | 0 | X | X | X | X | 3 |
| Gushue | 0 | 2 | 3 | 2 | 0 | 3 | X | X | X | X | 10 |

| Team | 1 | 2 | 3 | 4 | 5 | 6 | 7 | 8 | 9 | 10 | Final |
|---|---|---|---|---|---|---|---|---|---|---|---|
| Peddigrew | 0 | 0 | 0 | 1 | 0 | 1 | 0 | 0 | X | X | 2 |
| C. Thomas | 0 | 1 | 0 | 0 | 3 | 0 | 2 | 3 | X | X | 9 |

=== Draw 2 ===
Wednesday, February 6, 2:00 pm

| Team | 1 | 2 | 3 | 4 | 5 | 6 | 7 | 8 | 9 | 10 | Final |
|---|---|---|---|---|---|---|---|---|---|---|---|
| Symonds | 0 | 3 | 1 | 0 | 0 | 4 | X | X | X | X | 8 |
| Peddigrew | 0 | 0 | 0 | 0 | 1 | 0 | X | X | X | X | 1 |

| Team | 1 | 2 | 3 | 4 | 5 | 6 | 7 | 8 | 9 | 10 | Final |
|---|---|---|---|---|---|---|---|---|---|---|---|
| Adams | 0 | 0 | 1 | 0 | 1 | 1 | 1 | 1 | 0 | X | 5 |
| Gushue | 1 | 2 | 0 | 3 | 0 | 0 | 0 | 0 | 3 | X | 9 |

| Team | 1 | 2 | 3 | 4 | 5 | 6 | 7 | 8 | 9 | 10 | Final |
|---|---|---|---|---|---|---|---|---|---|---|---|
| Mercer | 0 | 0 | 0 | 2 | 0 | 0 | 1 | 0 | X | X | 3 |
| C. Thomas | 0 | 1 | 1 | 0 | 2 | 3 | 0 | 2 | X | X | 9 |

| Team | 1 | 2 | 3 | 4 | 5 | 6 | 7 | 8 | 9 | 10 | Final |
|---|---|---|---|---|---|---|---|---|---|---|---|
| Ryan | 0 | 0 | 1 | 0 | 1 | 0 | 2 | 0 | 0 | X | 4 |
| J. Thomas | 0 | 1 | 0 | 2 | 0 | 4 | 0 | 1 | 1 | X | 9 |

=== Draw 3 ===
Wednesday, February 6, 7:00 pm

| Team | 1 | 2 | 3 | 4 | 5 | 6 | 7 | 8 | 9 | 10 | Final |
|---|---|---|---|---|---|---|---|---|---|---|---|
| Ryan | 0 | 0 | 1 | 0 | 0 | 2 | 0 | 0 | 1 | 0 | 4 |
| Gushue | 1 | 0 | 0 | 1 | 1 | 0 | 0 | 2 | 0 | 0 | 5 |

| Team | 1 | 2 | 3 | 4 | 5 | 6 | 7 | 8 | 9 | 10 | Final |
|---|---|---|---|---|---|---|---|---|---|---|---|
| Mercer | 0 | 0 | 0 | 1 | 0 | X | X | X | X | X | 1 |
| Peddigrew | 3 | 1 | 2 | 0 | 4 | X | X | X | X | X | 10 |

| Team | 1 | 2 | 3 | 4 | 5 | 6 | 7 | 8 | 9 | 10 | Final |
|---|---|---|---|---|---|---|---|---|---|---|---|
| Adams | 1 | 1 | 0 | 0 | 0 | 0 | 1 | 1 | 1 | 1 | 6 |
| J. Thomas | 0 | 0 | 3 | 1 | 1 | 2 | 0 | 0 | 0 | 0 | 7 |

| Team | 1 | 2 | 3 | 4 | 5 | 6 | 7 | 8 | 9 | 10 | Final |
|---|---|---|---|---|---|---|---|---|---|---|---|
| Symonds | 1 | 0 | 1 | 0 | 1 | 0 | 0 | X | X | X | 3 |
| C. Thomas | 0 | 3 | 0 | 3 | 0 | 1 | 1 | X | X | X | 8 |

=== Draw 4 ===
Thursday, February 7, 9:00 am

| Team | 1 | 2 | 3 | 4 | 5 | 6 | 7 | 8 | 9 | 10 | Final |
|---|---|---|---|---|---|---|---|---|---|---|---|
| Symonds | 1 | 0 | 2 | 1 | 1 | 1 | 0 | 0 | 2 | X | 8 |
| J. Thomas | 0 | 2 | 0 | 0 | 0 | 0 | 2 | 1 | 0 | X | 5 |

| Team | 1 | 2 | 3 | 4 | 5 | 6 | 7 | 8 | 9 | 10 | Final |
|---|---|---|---|---|---|---|---|---|---|---|---|
| Adams | 1 | 0 | 2 | 0 | 0 | 1 | 0 | X | X | X | 4 |
| C. Thomas | 0 | 3 | 0 | 0 | 4 | 0 | 2 | X | X | X | 9 |

| Team | 1 | 2 | 3 | 4 | 5 | 6 | 7 | 8 | 9 | 10 | Final |
|---|---|---|---|---|---|---|---|---|---|---|---|
| Ryan | 0 | 0 | 0 | 0 | 0 | 1 | 0 | X | X | X | 1 |
| Peddigrew | 1 | 0 | 0 | 1 | 1 | 0 | 5 | X | X | X | 8 |

| Team | 1 | 2 | 3 | 4 | 5 | 6 | 7 | 8 | 9 | 10 | Final |
|---|---|---|---|---|---|---|---|---|---|---|---|
| Mercer | 0 | 0 | 2 | 0 | 0 | 0 | 0 | X | X | X | 2 |
| Gushue | 1 | 2 | 0 | 2 | 1 | 2 | 1 | X | X | X | 9 |

=== Draw 5 ===
Thursday, February 7, 3:00 pm

| Team | 1 | 2 | 3 | 4 | 5 | 6 | 7 | 8 | 9 | 10 | Final |
|---|---|---|---|---|---|---|---|---|---|---|---|
| Gushue | 0 | 0 | 2 | 1 | 0 | 2 | 0 | 1 | 0 | 1 | 7 |
| C. Thomas | 1 | 1 | 0 | 0 | 2 | 0 | 1 | 0 | 0 | 0 | 5 |

| Team | 1 | 2 | 3 | 4 | 5 | 6 | 7 | 8 | 9 | 10 | Final |
|---|---|---|---|---|---|---|---|---|---|---|---|
| J. Thomas | 1 | 0 | 1 | 0 | 2 | 1 | 1 | 0 | 0 | 1 | 7 |
| Peddigrew | 0 | 2 | 0 | 2 | 0 | 0 | 0 | 2 | 0 | 0 | 6 |

| Team | 1 | 2 | 3 | 4 | 5 | 6 | 7 | 8 | 9 | 10 | Final |
|---|---|---|---|---|---|---|---|---|---|---|---|
| Mercer | 0 | 1 | 0 | 2 | 0 | X | X | X | X | X | 3 |
| Symonds | 3 | 0 | 5 | 0 | 4 | X | X | X | X | X | 12 |

| Team | 1 | 2 | 3 | 4 | 5 | 6 | 7 | 8 | 9 | 10 | Final |
|---|---|---|---|---|---|---|---|---|---|---|---|
| Adams | 1 | 1 | 0 | 2 | 0 | 0 | 2 | 2 | 1 | X | 9 |
| Ryan | 0 | 0 | 2 | 0 | 1 | 1 | 0 | 0 | 0 | X | 4 |

=== Draw 6 ===
Friday, February 8, 9:00 am

| Team | 1 | 2 | 3 | 4 | 5 | 6 | 7 | 8 | 9 | 10 | 11 | Final |
|---|---|---|---|---|---|---|---|---|---|---|---|---|
| Adams | 0 | 1 | 0 | 2 | 0 | 0 | 2 | 1 | 0 | 0 | 1 | 7 |
| Peddigrew | 1 | 0 | 2 | 0 | 1 | 0 | 0 | 0 | 1 | 1 | 0 | 6 |

| Team | 1 | 2 | 3 | 4 | 5 | 6 | 7 | 8 | 9 | 10 | Final |
|---|---|---|---|---|---|---|---|---|---|---|---|
| Symonds | 0 | 2 | 0 | 1 | 0 | 2 | 0 | 2 | 0 | X | 7 |
| Gushue | 1 | 0 | 3 | 0 | 1 | 0 | 4 | 0 | 2 | X | 11 |

| Team | 1 | 2 | 3 | 4 | 5 | 6 | 7 | 8 | 9 | 10 | Final |
|---|---|---|---|---|---|---|---|---|---|---|---|
| Ryan | 0 | 2 | 2 | 1 | 0 | 1 | 1 | 0 | 0 | 0 | 7 |
| C. Thomas | 4 | 0 | 0 | 0 | 1 | 0 | 0 | 1 | 1 | 1 | 8 |

| Team | 1 | 2 | 3 | 4 | 5 | 6 | 7 | 8 | 9 | 10 | Final |
|---|---|---|---|---|---|---|---|---|---|---|---|
| Mercer | 0 | 0 | 0 | 0 | 1 | 0 | X | X | X | X | 1 |
| J. Thomas | 1 | 2 | 1 | 1 | 0 | 3 | X | X | X | X | 8 |

=== Draw 7 ===
Friday, February 8, 2:00 pm

| Team | 1 | 2 | 3 | 4 | 5 | 6 | 7 | 8 | 9 | 10 | Final |
|---|---|---|---|---|---|---|---|---|---|---|---|
| Mercer | 3 | 0 | 0 | 1 | 0 | 1 | 0 | 1 | 0 | 0 | 6 |
| Ryan | 0 | 3 | 1 | 0 | 1 | 0 | 0 | 0 | 0 | 1 | 6 |

| Team | 1 | 2 | 3 | 4 | 5 | 6 | 7 | 8 | 9 | 10 | Final |
|---|---|---|---|---|---|---|---|---|---|---|---|
| J. Thomas | 1 | 0 | 1 | 0 | 0 | 0 | 2 | 0 | 0 | X | 4 |
| C. Thomas | 0 | 1 | 0 | 1 | 1 | 2 | 0 | 1 | 1 | X | 7 |

| Team | 1 | 2 | 3 | 4 | 5 | 6 | 7 | 8 | 9 | 10 | Final |
|---|---|---|---|---|---|---|---|---|---|---|---|
| Adams | 0 | 2 | 0 | 0 | 0 | 2 | 0 | 1 | 1 | 0 | 6 |
| Symonds | 1 | 0 | 0 | 2 | 1 | 0 | 2 | 0 | 0 | 1 | 7 |

| Team | 1 | 2 | 3 | 4 | 5 | 6 | 7 | 8 | 9 | 10 | Final |
|---|---|---|---|---|---|---|---|---|---|---|---|
| Gushue | 2 | 0 | 2 | 0 | 0 | X | X | X | X | X | 4 |
| Peddigrew | 0 | 1 | 0 | 1 | 0 | X | X | X | X | X | 2 |

== Playoffs ==
Page playoff system
1 | Gushue | 8
2 | C. Thomas | 2
3 | Symonds | 6
4 | J. Thomas | 7

Semifinal
2 | C. Thomas | 8
4 | J. Thomas | 5

Final
1 | Gushue | 8
2 | C. Thomas | 2

=== 1 vs. 2 ===
Saturday, February 9, 2:00 pm

| Team | 1 | 2 | 3 | 4 | 5 | 6 | 7 | 8 | 9 | 10 | Final |
|---|---|---|---|---|---|---|---|---|---|---|---|
| Gushue | 0 | 3 | 3 | 0 | 2 | X | X | X | X | X | 8 |
| C. Thomas | 1 | 0 | 0 | 1 | 0 | X | X | X | X | X | 2 |

=== 3 vs. 4 ===
Saturday, February 9, 2:00 pm

| Team | 1 | 2 | 3 | 4 | 5 | 6 | 7 | 8 | 9 | 10 | Final |
|---|---|---|---|---|---|---|---|---|---|---|---|
| Symonds | 0 | 1 | 0 | 0 | 0 | 3 | 0 | 1 | 1 | 0 | 6 |
| J. Thomas | 2 | 0 | 1 | 1 | 1 | 0 | 0 | 0 | 0 | 2 | 7 |

=== Semifinal ===
Saturday, February 9, 7:00 pm

| Team | 1 | 2 | 3 | 4 | 5 | 6 | 7 | 8 | 9 | 10 | Final |
|---|---|---|---|---|---|---|---|---|---|---|---|
| C. Thomas | 0 | 1 | 0 | 2 | 0 | 3 | 1 | 1 | 0 | X | 8 |
| J. Thomas | 1 | 0 | 2 | 0 | 1 | 0 | 0 | 0 | 1 | X | 5 |

=== Final ===
Sunday, February 10, 1:00 pm

| Team | 1 | 2 | 3 | 4 | 5 | 6 | 7 | 8 | 9 | 10 | Final |
|---|---|---|---|---|---|---|---|---|---|---|---|
| Gushue | 2 | 0 | 0 | 3 | 3 | 0 | 0 | X | X | X | 8 |
| C. Thomas | 0 | 0 | 1 | 0 | 0 | 0 | 1 | X | X | X | 2 |

2013 Newfoundland and Labrador Tankard

Brad Gushue
10th Newfoundland and Labrador Provincial Championship title
