= Canadian Olympic Curling Trials =

Curling tournament held in Canada

The Canadian Olympic Curling Trials, marketed from 2009 through 2017 as the Roar of the Rings, are a quadrennial tournament held by Curling Canada that determines the Canadian men's and women's representatives for curling at the Winter Olympics. The system of qualification for the Curling Trials varies for each event, and can be quite complicated. One main reason for an Olympic qualifying event apart from the national championships (The Brier and the Scotties) is that provincial residency rules do not apply to the Olympic team. Curling was added to the Olympic programme in 1998, and a Canadian Olympic Trials have been held the year prior since 1997.

There were also Olympic Trials held in 1987 for the curling demonstration event at the 1988 Winter Olympics. The 1987 Trials were known as the Labatt National Curling Trials and were held April 19–25, 1987 in Calgary, the same site of the 1988 Winter Olympics. Linda Moore would skip the women's winning team and Ed Lukowich skipped the men's winner.

There were no trials for the 1992 Winter Olympics curling demonstration event. The winner of the 1991 Scott Tournament of Hearts (Julie Sutton) and the 1991 Labatt Brier (Kevin Martin) got to represent Canada at the event.

== Men's champions ==
Trials	Winning team	Runners up	Location	Placing at Olympics
1987	(Alberta) Ed Lukowich, John Ferguson, Neil Houston, Brent Syme, Wayne Hart	(Alberta) Pat Ryan, Randy Ferbey, Don Walchuk, Don McKenzie	Calgary, Alberta	(bronze) Bronze
1997	(Ontario) Mike Harris, Richard Hart, Collin Mitchell, George Karrys, Paul Savage	(Alberta) Kevin Martin, Don Walchuk, Rudy Ramcharan, Don Bartlett	Brandon, Manitoba	(silver) Silver
2001	(Alberta) Kevin Martin, Don Walchuk, Carter Rycroft, Don Bartlett, Ken Tralnberg	(Manitoba) Kerry Burtnyk, Jeff Ryan, Rob Meakin, Keith Fenton, Andy Hick	Regina, Saskatchewan	(silver) Silver
2005	(Newfoundland and Labrador) Brad Gushue, Mark Nichols, Russ Howard, Jamie Korab, Mike Adam	(Manitoba) Jeff Stoughton, Jon Mead, Garry Van Den Berghe, Steve Gould, Don Harvey	Halifax, Nova Scotia	(gold) Gold
2009	(Alberta) Kevin Martin, John Morris, Marc Kennedy, Ben Hebert, Adam Enright	(Ontario) Glenn Howard, Richard Hart, Brent Laing, Craig Savill, Steve Bice	Edmonton, Alberta	(gold) Gold
2013	(Ontario) Brad Jacobs, Ryan Fry, E. J. Harnden, Ryan Harnden, Caleb Flaxey	(British Columbia) John Morris, Jim Cotter, Tyrel Griffith, Rick Sawatsky, Jason Gunnlaugson	Winnipeg, Manitoba	(gold) Gold
2017	(Alberta) Kevin Koe, Marc Kennedy, Brent Laing, Ben Hebert, Scott Pfeifer	(Manitoba) Mike McEwen, B. J. Neufeld, Matt Wozniak, Denni Neufeld	Ottawa, Ontario	Fourth
2021	(Newfoundland and Labrador) Brad Gushue, Mark Nichols, Brett Gallant, Geoff Walker, Jeff Thomas (Note: Marc Kennedy was the alternate for Team Gushue at the Olympics.)	(Ontario) Brad Jacobs, Marc Kennedy, E. J. Harnden, Ryan Harnden	Saskatoon, Saskatchewan	(bronze) Bronze
2025	(Alberta) Brad Jacobs, Marc Kennedy, Brett Gallant, Ben Hebert, Mike Caione (Note: Tyler Tardi was the alternate for Team Jacobs at the Olympics.)	(Manitoba) Matt Dunstone, Colton Lott, E. J. Harnden, Ryan Harnden	Halifax, Nova Scotia	(gold) Gold

== Women's champions ==
Trials	Winning team	Runners up	Location	Placing at Olympics
1987	(British Columbia) Linda Moore, Lindsay Sparkes, Debbie Jones, Penny Ryan, Patti Vande	(Manitoba) Connie Laliberte, Janet Harvey, Corinne Peters, Janet Arnott	Calgary, Alberta	(gold) Gold
1997	(Saskatchewan) Sandra Schmirler, Jan Betker, Joan McCusker, Marcia Gudereit	(Alberta) Shannon Kleibrink, Glenys Bakker, Shannon Nimmo, Joanne Sipka, Sally Shigehiro	Brandon, Manitoba	(gold) Gold
2001	(British Columbia) Kelley Law, Julie Skinner, Georgina Wheatcroft, Diane Nelson, Cheryl Noble	(Saskatchewan) Sherry Anderson, Kim Hodson, Sandra Mulroney, Donna Gignac, Heather Walsh	Regina, Saskatchewan	(bronze) Bronze
2005	(Alberta) Shannon Kleibrink, Amy Nixon, Glenys Bakker, Christine Keshen, Sandra Jenkins	(British Columbia) Kelly Scott, Jeanna Schraeder, Sasha Carter, Renee Simons, Michelle Allen	Halifax, Nova Scotia	(bronze) Bronze
2009	(Alberta) Cheryl Bernard, Susan O'Connor, Carolyn Darbyshire, Cori Bartel, Kristie Moore	(Alberta) Shannon Kleibrink, Amy Nixon, Bronwen Webster, Chelsey Bell, Heather Nedohin	Edmonton, Alberta	(silver) Silver
2013	(Manitoba) Jennifer Jones, Kaitlyn Lawes, Jill Officer, Dawn McEwen, Kirsten Wall	(Ontario) Sherry Middaugh, Jo-Ann Rizzo, Lee Merklinger, Leigh Armstrong, Lori Eddy	Winnipeg, Manitoba	(gold) Gold
2017	(Ontario) Rachel Homan, Emma Miskew, Joanne Courtney, Lisa Weagle, Cheryl Kreviazuk (Note: Cheryl Bernard was the alternate for Team Homan at the Olympics.)	(Alberta) Chelsea Carey, Cathy Overton-Clapham, Jocelyn Peterman, Laine Peters	Ottawa, Ontario	Sixth
2021	(Manitoba) Jennifer Jones, Kaitlyn Lawes, Jocelyn Peterman, Dawn McEwen, Lisa Weagle	(Manitoba) Tracy Fleury, Selena Njegovan, Liz Fyfe, Kristin MacCuish, Chelsea Carey	Saskatoon, Saskatchewan	Fifth
2025	(Ontario) Rachel Homan, Tracy Fleury, Emma Miskew, Sarah Wilkes, Rachelle Brown	(Nova Scotia) Christina Black, Jill Brothers, Jenn Baxter, Karlee Everist, Marlee Powers	Halifax, Nova Scotia	(bronze) Bronze

== Sources ==
- Curling Trials Backgrounder – thecurler.com
