= 1987 Canadian Olympic Curling Trials =

Teams selection for the 1988 Winter Olympics

The 1987 Labatt National Curling Trials were held April 19-25, 1987 at the Max Bell Arena in Calgary, Alberta. They were held to determine the Canadian National men's and women's Teams for the demonstration curling event at the 1988 Winter Olympics.

The teams were selected by a committee based on recent success and performance at a training camp. Some teams were formed just for the Trials themselves. Members of the committee were Canadian Curling Association president Harvey Mazinke, Garry DeBlonde, Vera Pezer, Art Quinney, Ron Anton, Dot MacRea and Warren Hansen. There were some teams that were thought to be snubbed by the committee, such as Paul Gowsell, Mark Noseworthy and Al Hackner, the latter of whom had boycotted the tryouts because curlers tried out as individuals rather than teams.

== Men ==
=== Teams ===
Skip	Third	Second	Lead	Province
Kevin Adams	Malcolm Turner	Don Reddick	Ian Journeaux	Quebec
Russ Howard	Glenn Howard	Tim Belcourt	Kent Carstairs	Ontario
Eugene Hritzuk	Ron Mills	Ian Tetley	Bob Ursel	Saskatchewan
Ed Lukowich	John Ferguson	Neil Houston	Brent Syme	Alberta
Pat Ryan	Randy Ferbey	Don Walchuk	Don McKenzie	Alberta
Bernie Sparkes	Jim Armstrong	Monte Ziola	Jamie Saxton	British Columbia
Ed Werenich	Paul Savage	John Kawaja	Neil Harrison	Ontario
Kirk Ziola	Mark Olson	Denis Marchand	Bill Fletcher	Ontario

=== Final standings ===
Skip	W	L
(Alberta) Pat Ryan (Edmonton)	6	1
(Alberta) Ed Lukowich (Calgary)	4	3
(Ontario) Ed Werenich (Toronto)	4	3
(Ontario) Russ Howard (Penetanguishene)	4	3
(British Columbia) Bernie Sparkes (Vancouver)	4	3
(Quebec) Kevin Adams (Montreal)	3	4
(Ontario) Kirk Ziola (London)	3	4
(Saskatchewan) Eugene Hritzuk (Saskatoon)	0	7

=== Tiebreakers ===
- Werenich 8-6 Howard
- Lukowich 9-4 Sparkes

=== Playoffs ===
Semifinal			Final
			1	(Alberta) Pat Ryan	3
2	(Alberta) Ed Lukowich	7	2	(Alberta) Ed Lukowich	6
3	(Ontario) Ed Werenich	2

==== Semifinal ====
Team	1	2	3	4	5	6	7	8	9	10	Final
(Ontario) Ed Werenich	0	1	0	0	1	0	0	X	X	X	2
(Alberta) Ed Lukowich	1	0	2	0	0	3	1	X	X	X	7

==== Final ====
Team	1	2	3	4	5	6	7	8	9	10	Final
(Alberta) Ed Lukowich	0	1	0	0	0	0	0	5	0	X	6
(Alberta) Pat Ryan	1	0	0	0	0	0	1	0	1	X	3

== Women ==
=== Teams ===
Skip	Third	Second	Lead	Province
Marilyn Darte	Kathy McEdwards	Chris Jurgenson	Sandra Rippel	Ontario
Kathie Ellwood	Cathy Treloar	Laurie Ellwood	Sandra Asham	Manitoba
Kathy Fahlman	Sandra Schmirler	Janice Betker	Sheila Schneider	Saskatchewan
Colleen Jones	Kay Smith	Kim Dolan	Cathy Caudle	Nova Scotia
Connie Laliberte	Janet Harvey	Corinne Peters	Janet Arnott	Manitoba
Linda Moore	Lindsay Sparkes	Debbie Jones	Penny Ryan	British Columbia
Chris More	Cathy Shaw	Chris Gervais	Sheila Kavanagh	Manitoba
Pat Sanders	Georgina Hawkes	Louise Herlinveaux	Deb Massullo	British Columbia

=== Final standings ===
Skip	W	L
(British Columbia) Linda Moore (Vancouver)	5	2
(Manitoba) Connie Laliberte (Winnipeg)	5	2
(British Columbia) Pat Sanders (Victoria)	4	3
(Saskatchewan) Kathy Fahlman (Regina)	4	3
(Nova Scotia) Colleen Jones (Halifax)	4	3
(Ontario) Marilyn Darte (St. Catharines)	2	5
(Manitoba) Kathie Ellwood (Winnipeg)	2	5
(Manitoba) Chris More (Winnipeg)	2	5

=== Tiebreakers ===
- Sanders 7-0 Jones
- Sanders 9-2 Fahlman

=== Playoffs ===
Semifinal			Final
			1	(British Columbia) Linda Moore	7
2	(Manitoba) Connie Laliberte	6	2	(Manitoba) Connie Laliberte	5
3	(British Columbia) Pat Sanders	4

==== Semifinal ====
Team	1	2	3	4	5	6	7	8	9	10	Final
(British Columbia) Pat Sanders	0	0	0	1	0	1	0	2	0	0	4
(Manitoba) Connie Laliberte	0	2	0	0	1	0	2	0	0	1	6

===== Final =====
Team	1	2	3	4	5	6	7	8	9	10	Final
(Manitoba) Connie Laliberte	0	1	1	0	1	0	0	2	0	0	5
(British Columbia) Linda Moore	1	0	0	1	0	0	2	0	0	3	7

== Sources ==
- 2017 Canadian Olympic Curling Trials Media Guide: 1987 Trials
