= John Ferguson (curler) =

Canadian curler

- Curler ♂
- Other names: Fergie
- Born: January 18, 1958 (age 68); Calgary, Alberta, Canada

Team
- Curling club: Calgary CC, Calgary, AB, Calgary Winter Club, Calgary, AB

Curling career
- Member Association: Alberta
- Brier: 3: (1984, 1986, 1994)
- World Championship: 1 (1986)
- Olympic: 1 (1988) (demo)
- Other appearances: World Junior Championships: 1 (1978)
Medal record
Curling
Representing Canada
Olympics
Bronze medal – third place	1988 Calgary (demonstration)
World Championships
Gold medal – first place	1986 Toronto
World Junior Championships
Gold medal – first place	1978 Grindelwald
Representing Alberta
Labatt Brier
Gold medal – first place	1986 Kitchener
Bronze medal – third place	1984 Victoria
Canadian Olympic Trials
Gold medal – first place	1987 Calgary

John W. "Fergie" Ferguson (born January 18, 1958) is a Canadian curler.

He is a 1986 World Men's champion and a 1986 Labatt Brier champion.

He played at the 1988 Winter Olympics when curling was a demonstration sport, Canadian men's team won bronze medal.

== Awards ==
- Canadian Curling Hall of Fame: inducted in 1992 with all Ed Lukowich 1986 team.

== Teams ==
Season	Skip	Third	Second	Lead	Alternate	Events
1976–77	Paul Gowsell	John Ferguson	Doug MacFarlane	Kelly Stearne		CJCC 1977 (gold)
1977–78	Paul Gowsell	John Ferguson	Doug MacFarlane	Kelly Stearne		WJCC 1978 (gold)
1983–84	Ed Lukowich	John Ferguson	Neil Houston	Brent Syme		Brier 1984 (bronze)
1985–86	Ed Lukowich	John Ferguson	Neil Houston	Brent Syme	Wayne Hart	Brier 1986 (gold); WCC 1986 (gold)
1986–87	Ed Lukowich	John Ferguson	Neil Houston	Brent Syme		COCT 1987 (gold)
1987–88	Ed Lukowich	John Ferguson	Neil Houston	Brent Syme	Wayne Hart	WOG 1988 (bronze)
1988–89	Ed Lukowich	John Ferguson	Wayne Hart	Brent Syme		
1992–93	Ed Lukowich	John Ferguson	Frank Morissette	Neil Houston		
1993–94	Ed Lukowich	Fred Maxie	Dan Petryk	Steve Petryk	John Ferguson	Brier 1994 (6th)
1994–95	Ed Lukowich	John Ferguson	Dan Petryk	Steve Petryk		
1999–00	Kevin Koe	John Ferguson	Scott Cripps	Jamie Koe		
