= Brent Syme =

Canadian curler

- Curler ♂
- Born: October 23, 1956 (age 70); Calgary, Alberta, Canada

Team
- Curling club: Calgary CC, Calgary, AB, Calgary Winter Club, Calgary, AB

Curling career
- Member Association: Alberta
- Brier: 3: (1983, 1984, 1986)
- World Championship: 1 (1986)
- Olympic: 1 (1988) (demo)
Medal record
Curling
Representing Canada
Olympics
Bronze medal – third place	1988 Calgary (demonstration)
World Championships
Gold medal – first place	1986 Toronto
Representing Alberta
Labatt Brier
Gold medal – first place	1986 Kitchener
Silver medal – second place	1983 Sudbury
Bronze medal – third place	1984 Victoria
Canadian Olympic Trials
Gold medal – first place	1987 Calgary

Brent A. Syme (born October 23, 1956) is a Canadian curler.

He is a 1986 World Men's champion and a 1986 Labatt Brier champion.

He played at the 1988 Winter Olympics when curling was a demonstration sport, Canadian men's team won bronze medal.

Syme retired from competitive curling in 1988 due to work commitments.

Outside of curling, Syme is a businessman and was the general manager of the Southern Alberta Curling Association.

Syme also coached the men's 2013 Canadian Masters Curling Championships winning team.

== Awards ==
- Canadian Curling Hall of Fame: inducted in 1992 with all Ed Lukowich 1986 team.

== Teams ==
Season	Skip	Third	Second	Lead	Alternate	Events
1980–81	Ed Lukowich	Mike Chernoff	Neil Houston	Brent Syme		
1982–83	Ed Lukowich	Mike Chernoff	Neil Houston	Brent Syme		Brier 1983 (silver)
1983–84	Ed Lukowich	John Ferguson	Neil Houston	Brent Syme		Brier 1984 (bronze)
1983–84	Ed Lukowich	John Ferguson	Neil Houston	Brent Syme		Brier 1984 (bronze)
1985–86	Ed Lukowich	John Ferguson	Neil Houston	Brent Syme	Wayne Hart	Brier 1986 (gold); WCC 1986 (gold)
1986–87	Ed Lukowich	John Ferguson	Neil Houston	Brent Syme		COCT 1987 (gold)
1987–88	Ed Lukowich	John Ferguson	Neil Houston	Brent Syme	Wayne Hart	WOG 1988 (bronze)
1994–95	Paul Gowsell	Troy Wylie	Brent Syme	Andrew Thomson	Bernie Wylie	
2009–10	Harold Breckenridge	Bob Genoway	Brent Syme	Gord Dewar		
