= Neil Houston =

Canadian curler (born 1957)

- Curler ♂
- Other names: Woody
- Born: January 19, 1957 (age 69); Calgary, Alberta, Canada

Team
- Curling club: Calgary CC, Calgary, AB, Calgary Winter Club, Calgary, AB

Curling career
- Member Association: Alberta (1972-1995); Ontario (1995-2007); British Columbia (2007-present)
- Brier: 4: (1980, 1983, 1984, 1986)
- World Championship: 1 (1986)
- Olympic: 1 (1988) (demo)
- Other appearances: World Junior Championships: 1 (1976)
Medal record
Curling
Representing Canada
Olympics
Bronze medal – third place	1988 Calgary (demonstration)
World Championships
Gold medal – first place	1986 Toronto
World Junior Championships
Gold medal – first place	1976 Aviemore
Representing Alberta
Labatt Brier
Gold medal – first place	1986 Kitchener
Silver medal – second place	1983 Sudbury
Bronze medal – third place	1980 Calgary
Bronze medal – third place	1984 Victoria
Canadian Olympic Trials
Gold medal – first place	1987 Calgary

Neil William "Woody" Houston (born January 19, 1957) is a Canadian curler.

He is a 1986 World Men's champion and a 1986 Labatt Brier champion.

He played at the 1988 Winter Olympics when curling was a demonstration sport, Canadian men's team won bronze medal.

During the early 1990s, Houston worked in sports facility management in Leduc, Whitecourt and Fort Saskatchewan. In 1995, Houston moved to Ottawa where he worked for the Canadian Curling Association as director of domestic development. After 13 years with the CCA, Houston moved to British Columbia in 2007 to become venue and sport manager for Curling at the 2010 Winter Olympics.

Houston coached the Andrew Bilesky rink at the 2013 Tim Hortons Brier.

== Personal life ==
Houston is married to Bev Bakka, and has two children.

== Awards ==
- Canadian Curling Hall of Fame: inducted in 1992 with all Ed Lukowich 1986 team.

== Teams ==
Season	Skip	Third	Second	Lead	Alternate	Events
1972–73	Barry Knight	Brent Syme	Jeff Robinson	Neil Houston		
1973–74	Barry Knight	Brent Syme	Jeff Robinson	Neil Houston		
1974–75	Paul Gowsell	Neil Houston	Glen Jackson	Kelly Stearne		CJCC 1975 (gold)
1975–76	Paul Gowsell	Neil Houston	Glen Jackson	Kelly Stearne		WJCC 1976 (gold)
1979–80	Paul Gowsell	Neil Houston	Glen Jackson	Kelly Stearne		Brier 1980 (bronze)
1980–81	Ed Lukowich	Mike Chernoff	Neil Houston	Brent Syme		
1982–83	Ed Lukowich	Mike Chernoff	Neil Houston	Brent Syme		Brier 1983 (silver)
1983–84	Ed Lukowich	John Ferguson	Neil Houston	Brent Syme		Brier 1984 (bronze)
1983–84	Ed Lukowich	John Ferguson	Neil Houston	Brent Syme		Brier 1984 (bronze)
1985–86	Ed Lukowich	John Ferguson	Neil Houston	Brent Syme	Wayne Hart	Brier 1986 (gold); WCC 1986 (gold)
1986–87	Ed Lukowich	John Ferguson	Neil Houston	Brent Syme		COCT 1987 (gold)
1987–88	Ed Lukowich	John Ferguson	Neil Houston	Brent Syme	Wayne Hart	WOG 1988 (bronze)
1992–93	Ed Lukowich	John Ferguson	Frank Morissette	Neil Houston		
1996–97	Jeff McCrady	Neil Houston	Steve Doty	Simon Turner		
1999–00	Jeff McCrady	Jim Hunker	Morgan Currie	Neil Houston		
2007–08	Dave Merklinger	Neil Houston	Tyrel Griffith	Andrew Bilesky		
2010–11	Dave Merklinger	Frank Morissette	Neil Houston	Ryan LeDrew		
