= Stefan Luder =

Swiss curler

- Curler ♂
- Born: 3 January 1967 (age 59)

Team
- Curling club: CC Dübendorf, Dübendorf

Curling career
- Member Association: Switzerland
- European Championship: 1 (1994)
- Olympic: 1 (1988; demo)
- Other appearances: European Mixed Championship: 1 (2008)
Medal record
Curling
Winter Olympics
Silver medal – second place	1988 Calgary (demonstration)
European Championships
Silver medal – second place	1994 Sundsvall
Swiss Men's Championship
Silver medal – second place	1994 Biel/Bienne
Silver medal – second place	2005 Bern
Swiss Mixed Championship
Gold medal – first place	2008 Luzern

Stefan Luder (born 3 January 1967) is a former Swiss curler.

He played second on the Swiss rink that won a silver medal at the 1988 Winter Olympics when curling was a demonstration sport. He was also a silver medallist at the 1994 European Curling Championships, and a two-time silver medallist at the Swiss Men's Curling Championship (1994, 2005), Swiss mixed champion curler (2008).

== Teams ==
=== Men's ===
Season	Skip	Third	Second	Lead	Alternate	Coach	Events
1987–88	Hansjörg Lips	Rico Simen	Stefan Luder	Peter Lips	Mario Flückiger		WOG 1988 (demo) (silver)
1994–95	Hansjörg Lips	Stefan Luder	Peter Lips	Rico Simen	Björn Schröder	Michael Müller	ECC 1994 (silver)

=== Mixed ===
Season	Skip	Third	Second	Lead	Alternate	Events
2007–08	Christian Moser	Franziska Luder	Stefan Luder	Michèle Moser		SMxCC 2008 (gold)
2008–09	Christian Moser	Niki Goridis	Stefan Luder	Michèle Moser	Esther Neuenschwander, Oliver Wininger	EMxCC 2008 (7th)
