= 1986 Labatt Brier =

- Host city: Kitchener, Ontario
- Arena: Kitchener Memorial Auditorium
- Dates: March 2–9
- Attendance: 97,684
- Winner: Alberta
- Curling club: Calgary WC, Calgary
- Skip: Ed Lukowich
- Third: John Ferguson
- Second: Neil Houston
- Lead: Brent Syme
- Alternate: Wayne Hart
- Finalist: Ontario (Russ Howard)

The 1986 Labatt Brier was held from March 2 to 9 at the Kitchener Memorial Auditorium in Kitchener, Ontario.

Ed Lukowich of Alberta defeated Russ Howard of Ontario to win his second Brier title.

== Teams ==
Alberta	British Columbia	Manitoba
Calgary WC, Calgary Skip: Ed Lukowich; Third: John Ferguson; Second: Neil Houston; Lead: Brent Syme; Alternate: Wayne Hart	Kamloops CC, Kamloops Skip: Barry McPhee; Third: Robert Kuroyama; Second: Brian Eden; Lead: Dave Schleppe; Alternate: Grant Young	Pembina CC, Winnipeg Skip: Mike Riley; Third: Brian Toews; Second: Russ Wookey; Lead: Terry Henry; Alternate: Clare DeBlonde
New Brunswick	Newfoundland	Northern Ontario
Thistle St. Andrews CC, Saint John Skip: Wade Blanchard; Third: Norbert MacKinnon; Second: Doug MacDonald; Lead: Bill Oliver; Alternate: Michael Blanchard	St. John's CC, St. John's Fourth: Chris Hamelmann; Skip: Fred Durant; Second: Blake Fizzard; Lead: Dave Warren; Alternate: Stephen Hamelmann	Soo CA, Sault Ste. Marie Skip: Al Harnden; Third: Mike Coulter; Second: Richard Evoy; Lead: Rick Elliott; Alternate: Eric Harnden
Nova Scotia	Ontario	Prince Edward Island
Mayflower CC, Halifax Skip: Bill Campbell, Jr. Third: Guy LaRocque; Second: Michael Wilson; Lead: Don Sweete; Alternate: Don Flemming	Penetanguishene CC, Penetanguishene Skip: Russ Howard; Third: Glenn Howard; Second: Tim Belcourt; Lead: Kent Carstairs; Alternate: Larry Merkley	Silver Fox CC, Summerside Skip: Grant Somers; Third: Mel Bernard; Second: John MacWilliams; Lead: Don Bourque; Alternate: Steve Costain
Quebec	Saskatchewan	Northwest Territories/Yukon
Glenmore CC, Montreal Skip: Gordon Hess; Third: Kevin Adams; Second: Malcolm Turner; Lead: Don Reddick; Alternate: Peter Ryan	Humboldt CC, Humboldt Skip: Lyle Muyres; Third: Warren Muyres; Second: Craig Muyres; Lead: Garth Muyres; Alternate: Eugene Hritzuk	Yellowknife CC, Yellowknife Skip: Klaus Schoenne; Third: Doug Bothamley; Second: Don Edl; Lead: Gerry Menard; Alternate: Trevor Alexander

== Map of teams ==
Provincial Winners

== Round-robin standings ==
Key
Teams to Playoffs
Teams to Tiebreaker

Province	Skip	W	L	Shot %
Alberta	Ed Lukowich	9	2	82
Ontario	Russ Howard	9	2	82
Saskatchewan	Lyle Muyres	7	4	80
British Columbia	Barry McPhee	7	4	76
Manitoba	Mike Riley	6	5	78
Newfoundland	Fred Durant	6	5	75
Northern Ontario	Al Harnden	6	5	74
Quebec	Gordon Hess	6	5	81
New Brunswick	Wade Blanchard	4	7	70
Northwest Territories/Yukon	Klaus Schoenne	3	8	69
Nova Scotia	Bill Campbell, Jr.	2	9	73
Prince Edward Island	Grant Somers	1	10	75

== Round-robin results ==
=== Draw 1 ===
Sheet A	1	2	3	4	5	6	7	8	9	10	Final
Manitoba (Riley) 🔨	1	0	0	0	0	0	2	0	1	0	4
Ontario (Howard)	0	1	1	1	0	0	0	2	0	0	5

Sheet B	1	2	3	4	5	6	7	8	9	10	Final
New Brunswick (Blanchard) 🔨	1	0	2	4	0	1	0	2	X	X	10
Nova Scotia (Campbell)	0	1	0	0	1	0	1	0	X	X	3

Sheet C	1	2	3	4	5	6	7	8	9	10	Final
Quebec (Hess)	0	0	1	0	2	0	0	1	0	0	4
Northwest Territories/Yukon (Schoenne) 🔨	0	0	0	2	0	2	0	0	2	1	7

Sheet D	1	2	3	4	5	6	7	8	9	10	11	Final
Newfoundland (Durant) 🔨	1	0	1	0	1	0	3	0	1	0	1	8
Saskatchewan (Muyres)	0	0	0	1	0	1	0	3	0	2	0	7

Sheet E	1	2	3	4	5	6	7	8	9	10	Final
Prince Edward Island (Somers) 🔨	0	0	1	0	2	0	1	0	0	X	4
British Columbia (McPhee)	0	1	0	3	0	1	0	2	1	X	8

=== Draw 2 ===
Sheet A	1	2	3	4	5	6	7	8	9	10	Final
Prince Edward Island (Somers)	0	0	1	0	1	0	0	0	1	X	3
Saskatchewan (Muyres) 🔨	1	1	0	2	0	0	1	0	0	X	5

Sheet B	1	2	3	4	5	6	7	8	9	10	Final
Northwest Territories/Yukon (Schoenne) 🔨	1	2	1	0	1	0	1	0	0	X	6
Newfoundland (Durant)	0	0	0	1	0	1	0	1	0	X	3

Sheet C	1	2	3	4	5	6	7	8	9	10	Final
Ontario (Howard)	1	0	0	0	0	2	1	5	X	X	9
British Columbia (McPhee) 🔨	0	0	1	1	0	0	0	0	X	X	2

Sheet D	1	2	3	4	5	6	7	8	9	10	Final
Manitoba (Riley)	0	0	0	0	0	1	0	0	0	X	1
Quebec (Hess) 🔨	0	0	2	0	2	0	0	1	1	X	6

Sheet E	1	2	3	4	5	6	7	8	9	10	11	Final
Alberta (Lukowich)	0	2	0	1	0	0	1	1	1	0	1	7
Northern Ontario (Harnden) 🔨	3	0	0	0	1	1	0	0	0	1	0	6

=== Draw 3 ===
Sheet C	1	2	3	4	5	6	7	8	9	10	Final
Northwest Territories/Yukon (Schoenne) 🔨	0	0	0	1	0	0	1	0	X	X	2
Manitoba (Riley)	0	0	1	0	2	2	0	2	X	X	7

Sheet D	1	2	3	4	5	6	7	8	9	10	Final
Quebec (Hess)	0	1	0	0	1	0	0	2	0	0	4
Ontario (Howard) 🔨	2	0	1	0	0	1	0	0	0	1	5

=== Draw 4 ===
Sheet A	1	2	3	4	5	6	7	8	9	10	Final
Quebec (Hess)	0	1	0	3	0	0	1	0	0	X	5
Newfoundland (Durant) 🔨	0	0	1	0	2	1	0	2	1	X	7

Sheet B	1	2	3	4	5	6	7	8	9	10	Final
British Columbia (McPhee) 🔨	1	0	1	0	1	0	2	0	0	X	5
Alberta (Lukowich)	0	3	0	1	0	2	0	4	0	X	10

Sheet C	1	2	3	4	5	6	7	8	9	10	Final
Saskatchewan (Muyres) 🔨	1	0	0	0	0	0	0	0	2	X	3
Nova Scotia (Campbell)	0	0	1	1	1	1	0	0	0	X	4

Sheet D	1	2	3	4	5	6	7	8	9	10	Final
Prince Edward Island (Somers) 🔨	1	0	1	0	0	0	1	0	X	X	3
Northern Ontario (Harnden)	0	2	0	1	0	3	0	2	X	X	8

Sheet E	1	2	3	4	5	6	7	8	9	10	Final
Northwest Territories/Yukon (Schoenne) 🔨	1	1	0	0	1	0	0	0	2	0	5
New Brunswick (Blanchard)	0	0	0	2	0	1	1	1	0	2	7

=== Draw 5 ===
Sheet A	1	2	3	4	5	6	7	8	9	10	11	Final
Nova Scotia (Campbell) 🔨	0	0	1	0	2	3	0	0	0	1	0	7
British Columbia (McPhee)	2	0	0	1	0	0	1	0	3	0	1	8

Sheet B	1	2	3	4	5	6	7	8	9	10	Final
Northern Ontario (Harnden)	0	3	2	0	3	0	0	1	1	X	10
Saskatchewan (Muyres) 🔨	2	0	0	2	0	1	1	0	0	X	6

Sheet C	1	2	3	4	5	6	7	8	9	10	Final
Alberta (Lukowich)	0	0	2	0	2	0	1	0	0	1	6
Prince Edward Island (Somers) 🔨	0	1	0	1	0	1	0	1	0	0	4

Sheet D	1	2	3	4	5	6	7	8	9	10	11	Final
Ontario (Howard) 🔨	0	2	0	0	1	0	0	0	0	1	0	4
New Brunswick (Blanchard)	1	0	0	1	0	0	0	1	1	0	1	5

Sheet E	1	2	3	4	5	6	7	8	9	10	Final
Newfoundland (Durant)	0	0	1	0	0	0	1	0	1	X	3
Manitoba (Riley) 🔨	2	1	0	0	0	1	0	1	0	X	5

=== Draw 6 ===
Sheet B	1	2	3	4	5	6	7	8	9	10	Final
Newfoundland (Durant)	0	2	0	1	1	0	3	0	0	X	7
Prince Edward Island (Somers) 🔨	2	0	1	0	0	0	0	0	1	X	4

Sheet C	1	2	3	4	5	6	7	8	9	10	Final
British Columbia (McPhee) 🔨	1	0	1	0	1	0	0	1	0	0	4
Saskatchewan (Muyres)	0	2	0	2	0	1	0	0	0	0	5

=== Draw 7 ===
Sheet A	1	2	3	4	5	6	7	8	9	10	Final
Northwest Territories/Yukon (Schoenne) 🔨	0	0	0	0	1	0	2	1	0	X	4
Northern Ontario (Harnden)	1	1	1	3	0	2	0	0	1	X	9

Sheet B	1	2	3	4	5	6	7	8	9	10	Final
Quebec (Hess) 🔨	1	0	0	2	0	0	4	1	X	X	8
British Columbia (McPhee)	0	0	1	0	0	1	0	0	X	X	2

Sheet C	1	2	3	4	5	6	7	8	9	10	Final
New Brunswick (Blanchard) 🔨	1	0	0	0	0	0	0	1	X	X	2
Newfoundland (Durant)	0	1	1	2	3	0	2	0	X	X	9

Sheet D	1	2	3	4	5	6	7	8	9	10	Final
Alberta (Lukowich) 🔨	0	1	0	2	0	2	1	2	X	X	8
Manitoba (Riley)	0	0	2	0	1	0	0	0	X	X	3

Sheet E	1	2	3	4	5	6	7	8	9	10	11	Final
Nova Scotia (Campbell) 🔨	0	1	0	0	0	3	0	0	1	0	0	5
Ontario (Howard)	0	0	0	2	0	0	0	1	0	2	1	6

=== Draw 8 ===
Sheet A	1	2	3	4	5	6	7	8	9	10	Final
New Brunswick (Blanchard)	1	0	1	2	0	1	0	0	0	X	5
Alberta (Lukowich) 🔨	0	3	0	0	3	0	2	1	1	X	10

Sheet B	1	2	3	4	5	6	7	8	9	10	Final
Ontario (Howard)	0	1	1	0	0	0	2	0	2	1	7
Northern Ontario (Harnden) 🔨	2	0	0	0	0	1	0	2	0	0	5

Sheet C	1	2	3	4	5	6	7	8	9	10	Final
Nova Scotia (Campbell)	0	0	3	0	0	2	0	0	0	0	5
Manitoba (Riley) 🔨	0	2	0	0	2	0	2	0	0	1	7

Sheet D	1	2	3	4	5	6	7	8	9	10	Final
Prince Edward Island (Somers) 🔨	2	0	1	0	3	0	2	0	X	X	8
Northwest Territories/Yukon (Schoenne)	0	1	0	0	0	1	0	1	X	X	3

Sheet E	1	2	3	4	5	6	7	8	9	10	11	12	Final
Quebec (Hess) 🔨	1	0	0	2	0	1	0	0	0	1	0	0	5
Saskatchewan (Muyres)	0	1	0	0	3	0	0	0	1	0	0	1	6

=== Draw 9 ===
Sheet C	1	2	3	4	5	6	7	8	9	10	Final
New Brunswick (Blanchard) 🔨	1	0	0	0	2	0	X	X	X	X	3
Northern Ontario (Harnden)	0	3	3	1	0	4	X	X	X	X	11

Sheet D	1	2	3	4	5	6	7	8	9	10	11	12	Final
Nova Scotia (Campbell)	0	0	0	1	0	2	0	2	0	1	0	0	6
Alberta (Lukowich) 🔨	0	0	1	0	2	0	3	0	0	0	0	1	7

=== Draw 10 ===
Sheet A	1	2	3	4	5	6	7	8	9	10	Final
Ontario (Howard) 🔨	0	1	0	2	0	2	0	1	0	X	6
Prince Edward Island (Somers)	0	0	1	0	1	0	1	0	2	X	5

Sheet B	1	2	3	4	5	6	7	8	9	10	Final
Saskatchewan (Muyres)	0	3	0	1	0	0	0	1	0	1	6
Manitoba (Riley) 🔨	1	0	1	0	0	1	0	0	2	0	5

Sheet C	1	2	3	4	5	6	7	8	9	10	Final
Newfoundland (Durant) 🔨	0	0	0	0	0	0	0	X	X	X	0
Alberta (Lukowich)	1	1	0	3	1	1	4	X	X	X	11

Sheet D	1	2	3	4	5	6	7	8	9	10	Final
Quebec (Hess)	0	0	2	0	1	2	0	1	0	0	6
Northern Ontario (Harnden) 🔨	1	0	0	1	0	0	3	0	2	1	8

Sheet E	1	2	3	4	5	6	7	8	9	10	Final
British Columbia (McPhee)	0	1	0	0	3	0	2	0	2	0	8
Northwest Territories/Yukon (Schoenne) 🔨	1	0	1	1	0	2	0	1	0	1	7

=== Draw 11 ===
Sheet A	1	2	3	4	5	6	7	8	9	10	Final
Saskatchewan (Muyres)	0	1	0	0	0	0	4	0	0	1	6
Northwest Territories/Yukon (Schoenne) 🔨	2	0	0	0	0	1	0	0	1	0	4

Sheet B	1	2	3	4	5	6	7	8	9	10	Final
Nova Scotia (Campbell) 🔨	1	0	0	0	1	0	1	0	0	0	3
Quebec (Hess)	0	0	1	0	0	3	0	0	0	1	5

Sheet C	1	2	3	4	5	6	7	8	9	10	Final
Manitoba (Riley)	0	1	0	2	1	0	0	0	1	X	5
British Columbia (McPhee) 🔨	2	0	2	0	0	3	0	1	0	X	8

Sheet D	1	2	3	4	5	6	7	8	9	10	Final
New Brunswick (Blanchard) 🔨	2	0	1	0	5	0	0	2	X	X	10
Prince Edward Island (Somers)	0	2	0	2	0	0	1	0	X	X	5

Sheet E	1	2	3	4	5	6	7	8	9	10	Final
Ontario (Howard) 🔨	0	1	0	2	1	0	0	0	0	2	6
Newfoundland (Durant)	0	0	1	0	0	1	0	0	1	0	3

=== Draw 12 ===
Sheet A	1	2	3	4	5	6	7	8	9	10	Final
Newfoundland (Durant)	0	1	0	2	1	1	4	1	0	X	10
Nova Scotia (Campbell) 🔨	3	0	2	0	0	0	0	0	1	X	6

Sheet B	1	2	3	4	5	6	7	8	9	10	Final
Alberta (Lukowich) 🔨	2	0	0	1	0	1	0	0	3	X	7
Ontario (Howard)	0	0	1	0	1	0	0	3	0	X	5

Sheet C	1	2	3	4	5	6	7	8	9	10	Final
Saskatchewan (Muyres)	1	0	0	2	0	3	1	0	2	X	9
New Brunswick (Blanchard) 🔨	0	0	2	0	1	0	0	2	0	X	5

Sheet D	1	2	3	4	5	6	7	8	9	10	Final
Northern Ontario (Harnden) 🔨	0	1	0	1	0	0	2	0	2	0	6
British Columbia (McPhee)	1	0	2	0	0	2	0	1	0	1	7

Sheet E	1	2	3	4	5	6	7	8	9	10	11	Final
Manitoba (Riley)	0	2	0	1	0	0	1	0	2	0	1	7
Prince Edward Island (Somers) 🔨	1	0	0	0	1	0	0	2	0	2	0	6

=== Draw 13 ===
Sheet A	1	2	3	4	5	6	7	8	9	10	Final
British Columbia (McPhee) 🔨	2	0	0	4	3	0	X	X	X	X	9
New Brunswick (Blanchard)	0	0	1	0	0	1	X	X	X	X	2

Sheet B	1	2	3	4	5	6	7	8	9	10	Final
Prince Edward Island (Somers)	0	0	0	0	0	0	2	0	0	0	2
Quebec (Hess) 🔨	0	0	0	0	0	2	0	0	0	3	5

Sheet C	1	2	3	4	5	6	7	8	9	10	Final
Northern Ontario (Harnden)	0	2	0	1	0	0	2	0	1	X	6
Newfoundland (Durant) 🔨	4	0	1	0	0	2	0	2	0	X	9

Sheet D	1	2	3	4	5	6	7	8	9	10	Final
Northwest Territories/Yukon (Schoenne)	0	0	2	3	1	0	3	0	1	X	10
Nova Scotia (Campbell) 🔨	1	2	0	0	0	1	0	1	0	X	5

Sheet E	1	2	3	4	5	6	7	8	9	10	Final
Saskatchewan (Muyres) 🔨	1	2	0	0	0	2	0	1	0	1	7
Alberta (Lukowich)	0	0	1	1	1	0	1	0	2	0	6

=== Draw 14 ===
Sheet A	1	2	3	4	5	6	7	8	9	10	11	Final
Northern Ontario (Harnden) 🔨	0	2	0	0	3	0	1	0	1	0	0	7
Manitoba (Riley)	1	0	2	1	0	1	0	1	0	1	1	8

Sheet B	1	2	3	4	5	6	7	8	9	10	Final
Alberta (Lukowich) 🔨	2	1	0	3	0	1	0	1	0	X	8
Northwest Territories/Yukon (Schoenne)	0	0	1	0	2	0	2	0	1	X	6

Sheet C	1	2	3	4	5	6	7	8	9	10	Final
Prince Edward Island (Somers)	0	0	0	0	0	2	0	0	1	X	3
Nova Scotia (Campbell) 🔨	0	0	3	1	0	0	0	3	0	X	7

Sheet D	1	2	3	4	5	6	7	8	9	10	Final
Saskatchewan (Muyres)	0	1	0	0	1	0	1	0	X	X	3
Ontario (Howard) 🔨	1	0	2	2	0	3	0	0	X	X	8

Sheet E	1	2	3	4	5	6	7	8	9	10	11	Final
New Brunswick (Blanchard) 🔨	1	0	1	1	0	0	0	1	0	2	0	6
Quebec (Hess)	0	2	0	0	2	0	0	0	2	0	1	7

=== Draw 15 ===
Sheet A	1	2	3	4	5	6	7	8	9	10	Final
Alberta (Lukowich)	0	0	1	0	0	2	0	1	0	X	4
Quebec (Hess) 🔨	0	2	0	1	2	0	1	0	1	X	7

Sheet B	1	2	3	4	5	6	7	8	9	10	11	Final
Manitoba (Riley) 🔨	1	0	0	1	0	1	2	0	1	0	1	7
New Brunswick (Blanchard)	0	0	1	0	1	0	0	2	0	2	0	6

Sheet C	1	2	3	4	5	6	7	8	9	10	Final
Northwest Territories/Yukon (Schoenne)	0	0	0	0	X	X	X	X	X	X	0
Ontario (Howard) 🔨	2	2	4	3	X	X	X	X	X	X	11

^ This game is set a Brier record for shortest game, ending after four ends.

Sheet D	1	2	3	4	5	6	7	8	9	10	Final
British Columbia (McPhee) 🔨	0	1	1	0	0	2	0	2	0	X	6
Newfoundland (Durant)	0	0	0	0	1	0	1	0	1	X	3

Sheet E	1	2	3	4	5	6	7	8	9	10	Final
Northern Ontario (Harnden) 🔨	1	1	0	3	3	0	3	X	X	X	11
Nova Scotia (Campbell)	0	0	3	0	0	1	0	X	X	X	4

== Tiebreaker ==
Sheet B	1	2	3	4	5	6	7	8	9	10	Final
Saskatchewan (Muyres) 🔨	0	0	0	1	0	0	0	1	1	0	3
British Columbia (McPhee)	0	1	0	0	3	0	0	0	0	1	5

Player percentages
Saskatchewan		British Columbia	
Garth Muyres	89%	Dave Schleppe	91%
Craig Muyres	83%	Brian Eden	84%
Warren Muyres	80%	Robert Kuroyama	79%
Lyle Muyres	66%	Barry McPhee	84%
Total	79%	Total	84%

== Playoffs ==
Semifinal			Final
			1	Alberta	4
2	Ontario	6	2	Ontario	3
3	British Columbia	5

=== Semifinal ===
Sheet C	1	2	3	4	5	6	7	8	9	10	11	Final
Ontario (Howard) 🔨	1	0	1	0	0	0	2	0	0	1	1	6
British Columbia (McPhee)	0	3	0	1	0	0	0	0	1	0	0	5

Player percentages
Ontario		British Columbia	
Kent Carstairs	93%	Dave Schleppe	83%
Tim Belcourt	89%	Brian Eden	81%
Glenn Howard	76%	Robert Kuroyama	83%
Russ Howard	86%	Barry McPhee	74%
Total	86%	Total	80%

=== Final ===
Sheet C	1	2	3	4	5	6	7	8	9	10	Final
Alberta (Lukowich) 🔨	0	1	0	0	0	1	1	0	0	1	4
Ontario (Howard)	0	0	0	1	1	0	0	0	1	0	3

Player percentages
Alberta		Ontario	
Brent Syme	94%	Kent Carstairs	94%
Neil Houston	88%	Tim Belcourt	86%
John Ferguson	94%	Glenn Howard	91%
Ed Lukowich	83%	Russ Howard	81%
Total	89%	Total	88%

== Statistics ==
=== Top 5 player percentages ===
Round Robin only

Leads	%
(Saskatchewan) Garth Muyres	88
(Ontario) Kent Carstairs	87
(Alberta) Brent Syme	84
(Prince Edward Island) Don Bourque	83
(Quebec) Don Reddick	83

Seconds	%
(Saskatchewan) Craig Muyres	84
(Quebec) Malcolm Turner	82
(Ontario) Tim Belcourt	80
(Manitoba) Russ Wookey	80
(British Columbia) Brian Eden	80

Thirds	%
(Quebec) Kevin Adams	84
(Alberta) John Ferguson	81
(Ontario) Glenn Howard	81
(Manitoba) Brian Toews	80
(British Columbia) Robert Kuroyama	78

Skips	%
(Alberta) Ed Lukowich	83
(Ontario) Russ Howard	80
(Quebec) Gordon Hess	77
(Manitoba) Mike Riley	74
(Saskatchewan) Lyle Muyres	71

=== Team percentages ===
Round Robin only

Province	Skip	%
Ontario	Russ Howard	82
Alberta	Ed Lukowich	82
Quebec	Gordon Hess	81
Saskatchewan	Lyle Muyres	80
Manitoba	Mike Riley	78
British Columbia	Barry McPhee	76
Newfoundland	Fred Durant	75
Prince Edward Island	Grant Somers	75
Northern Ontario	Al Harnden	74
Nova Scotia	Bill Campbell, Jr.	73
New Brunswick	Wade Blanchard	70
Northwest Territories/Yukon	Klaus Schoenne	69
