= 1986 Hexagon World Men's Curling Championship =

- Host city: Toronto, Ontario, Canada
- Arena: CNE Coliseum
- Dates: March 31 – April 6, 1986
- Winner: Canada
- Curling club: Calgary Winter Club; Calgary, Alberta
- Skip: Ed Lukowich
- Third: John Ferguson
- Second: Neil Houston
- Lead: Brent Syme
- Alternate: Wayne Hart
- Finalist: Scotland (David Smith)

The 1986 Hexagon World Men's Curling Championship, the men's world curling championship, was held from March 31 to April 6 at the CNE Coliseum in Toronto, Ontario, Canada.

== Battle of the Sexes ==
On April 5, a "Battle of the Sexes" game was held between 1983 World Men's Champion Ed Werenich and the reigning World Women's Champion Marilyn Darte rink in front of 6,000 fans at the CNE Coliseum. Werenich, and his rink of Rick Lang, John Kawaja and Neil Harrison prevailed 10–2. The event raised $26,000 for the Heart and Stroke Foundation of Ontario.

== Teams ==
| Canada | Denmark | France | Germany | Italy |
|---|---|---|---|---|
| Calgary Winter Club, Calgary, Alberta Skip: Ed Lukowich; Third: John Ferguson; Second: Neil Houston; Lead: Brent Syme; Alternate: Wayne Hart | Hvidovre CC, Hvidovre Skip: Tommy Stjerne; Third: Per Berg; Second: Peter Andersen; Lead: Ivan Frederiksen; Alternate: Michael Harry | Club de sports Megève, Megève Skip: Dominique Dupont-Roc; Third: Christian Dupont-Roc; Second: Thierry Mercier; Lead: Patrick Philippe | EV Füssen, Füssen Skip: Roland Jentsch; Third: Uli Sutor; Second: Charlie Kapp; Lead: Thomas Vogelsang; Alternate: Rudi Ibald; Coach: Otto Danieli | Tofane/Cortina CC, Cortina d'Ampezzo Skip: Andrea Pavani; Third: Franco Sovilla; Second: Fabio Alverà; Lead: Stefano Morona Alternate: Enea Pavani |
| Norway | Scotland | Sweden | Switzerland | United States |
| Risenga CK, Oslo Skip: Tormod Andreassen; Third: Flemming Davanger; Second: Stig-Arne Gunnestad; Lead: Kjell Berg; Alternate: Paul Enger; Coach: Nils Myhre | St. Martins CC, Perth Skip: David Smith; Third: Hammy McMillan; Second: Mike Hay; Lead: Pete Smith; Alternate: Gregor Smith; Coach: Alex F. Torrance | Sollefteå CK, Sollefteå Skip: Stefan Hasselborg; Third: Mikael Hasselborg; Second: Hans Nordin; Lead: Lars Wernblom; Alternate: Anders «Ante» Nilsson | Lausanne-Ouchy CC Skip: Jürg Tanner; Third: Patrick Hürlimann; Second: Patrik Lörtscher; Lead: Mario Gross | Madison CC, Madison, Wisconsin Skip: Steve Brown; Third: Wally Henry; Second: George Godfrey; Lead: Richard Maskel; Alternate: Huns Gustrowsky |

== Round-robin standings ==
Key
| Teams to playoffs |
| Teams to tiebreaker |

| Country | Skip | W | L |
| Scotland | David Smith | 9 | 0 |
| Sweden | Stefan Hasselborg | 6 | 3 |
| Canada | Ed Lukowich | 6 | 3 |
| United States | Steve Brown | 5 | 4 |
| Switzerland | Jürg Tanner | 5 | 4 |
| Norway | Tormod Andreassen | 5 | 4 |
| France | Dominique Dupont-Roc | 3 | 6 |
| Denmark | Tommy Stjerne | 2 | 7 |
| Germany | Roland Jentsch | 2 | 7 |
| Italy | Andrea Pavani | 2 | 7 |

== Round-robin results ==
=== Draw 1 ===
| Team | Final |
| Germany (Jentsch) | 6 |
| Norway (Andreassen) | 11 |

| Team | Final |
| Italy (Pavani) | 2 |
| United States (Brown) | 8 |

| Team | Final |
| Switzerland (Tanner) | 4 |
| Scotland (Smith) | 7 |

| Team | Final |
| France (Dupont-Roc) | 3 |
| Sweden (Hasselborg) | 4 |

| Team | Final |
| Canada (Lukowich) | 8 |
| Denmark (Stjerne) | 4 |

=== Draw 2 ===
| Team | Final |
| Canada (Lukowich) | 7 |
| Italy (Pavani) | 9 |

| Team | Final |
| Scotland (Smith) | 6 |
| Denmark (Stjerne) | 5 |

| Team | Final |
| Germany (Jentsch) | 4 |
| France (Dupont-Roc) | 5 |

| Team | Final |
| Switzerland (Tanner) | 7 |
| Norway (Andreassen) | 6 |

| Team | Final |
| United States (Brown) | 6 |
| Sweden (Hasselborg) | 10 |

=== Draw 3 ===
| Team | Final |
| Sweden (Hasselborg) | 8 |
| Denmark (Stjerne) | 4 |

| Team | Final |
| Norway (Andreassen) | 10 |
| France (Dupont-Roc) | 2 |

| Team | Final |
| United States (Brown) | 1 |
| Canada (Lukowich) | 8 |

| Team | Final |
| Scotland (Smith) | 7 |
| Germany (Jentsch) | 1 |

| Team | Final |
| Switzerland (Tanner) | 4 |
| Italy (Pavani) | 2 |

=== Draw 4 ===
| Team | Final |
| Norway (Andreassen) | 4 |
| United States (Brown) | 6 |

| Team | Final |
| Switzerland (Tanner) | 6 |
| Germany (Jentsch) | 1 |

| Team | Final |
| Italy (Pavani) | 6 |
| Denmark (Stjerne) | 7 |

| Team | Final |
| Sweden (Hasselborg) | 7 |
| Canada (Lukowich) | 4 |

| Team | Final |
| France (Dupont-Roc) | 3 |
| Scotland (Smith) | 4 |

=== Draw 5 ===
| Team | Final |
| Switzerland (Tanner) | 6 |
| Canada (Lukowich) | 7 |

| Team | Final |
| United States (Brown) | 4 |
| Scotland (Smith) | 7 |

| Team | Final |
| Norway (Andreassen) | 6 |
| Sweden (Hasselborg) | 5 |

| Team | Final |
| Italy (Pavani) | 5 |
| France (Dupont-Roc) | 6 |

| Team | Final |
| Denmark (Stjerne) | 12 |
| Germany (Jentsch) | 2 |

=== Draw 6 ===
| Team | Final |
| Denmark (Stjerne) | 2 |
| France (Dupont-Roc) | 4 |

| Team | Final |
| Germany (Jentsch) | 3 |
| Sweden (Hasselborg) | 8 |

| Team | Final |
| Scotland (Smith) | 5 |
| Italy (Pavani) | 4 |

| Team | Final |
| United States (Brown) | 7 |
| Switzerland (Tanner) | 4 |

| Team | Final |
| Norway (Andreassen) | 2 |
| Canada (Lukowich) | 10 |

=== Draw 7 ===
| Team | Final |
| Italy (Pavani) | 3 |
| Germany (Jentsch) | 10 |

| Team | Final |
| Denmark (Stjerne) | 0 |
| Norway (Andreassen) | 9 |

| Team | Final |
| France (Dupont-Roc) | 5 |
| United States (Brown) | 7 |

| Team | Final |
| Canada (Lukowich) | 3 |
| Scotland (Smith) | 5 |

| Team | Final |
| Sweden (Hasselborg) | 10 |
| Switzerland (Tanner) | 4 |

=== Draw 8 ===
| Team | Final |
| Scotland (Smith) | 5 |
| Sweden (Hasselborg) | 4 |

| Team | Final |
| France (Dupont-Roc) | 4 |
| Canada (Lukowich) | 5 |

| Team | Final |
| Denmark (Stjerne) | 1 |
| Switzerland (Tanner) | 11 |

| Team | Final |
| Norway (Andreassen) | 7 |
| Italy (Pavani) | 4 |

| Team | Final |
| Germany (Jentsch) | 6 |
| United States (Brown) | 3 |

=== Draw 9 ===
| Team | Final |
| France (Dupont-Roc) | 5 |
| Switzerland (Tanner) | 6 |

| Team | Final |
| Sweden (Hasselborg) | 4 |
| Italy (Pavani) | 6 |

| Team | Final |
| Canada (Lukowich) | 5 |
| Germany (Jentsch) | 3 |

| Team | Final |
| Denmark (Stjerne) | 4 |
| United States (Brown) | 5 |

| Team | Final |
| Scotland (Smith) | 4 |
| Norway (Andreassen) | 2 |

== Tiebreakers ==
=== Round 1 ===
| Team | Final |
| Switzerland (Tanner) | 1 |
| United States (Brown) | 7 |

| Team | Final |
| Germany (Jentsch) | 3 |
| Denmark (Stjerne) | 4 |

=== Round 2 ===
| Team | Final |
| Norway (Andreassen) | 1 |
| Switzerland (Tanner) | 3 |

| Team | Final |
| Germany (Jentsch) | 6 |
| Italy (Pavani) | 5 |

== Playoffs ==
Semifinals
1 | Scotland | 3
4 | United States | 1
2 | Sweden | 3
3 | Canada | 6

Final
1 | Scotland | 3
3 | Canada | 4
Bronze Medal Game
4 | United States | 7
2 | Sweden | 2

=== Semifinals ===
| Sheet B | 1 | 2 | 3 | 4 | 5 | 6 | 7 | 8 | 9 | 10 | Final |
|---|---|---|---|---|---|---|---|---|---|---|---|
| Sweden (Hasselborg) 🔨 | 0 | 0 | 1 | 0 | 0 | 0 | 0 | 2 | 0 | X | 3 |
| Canada (Lukowich) | 3 | 1 | 0 | 0 | 1 | 0 | 0 | 0 | 1 | X | 6 |

| Sheet D | 1 | 2 | 3 | 4 | 5 | 6 | 7 | 8 | 9 | 10 | Final |
|---|---|---|---|---|---|---|---|---|---|---|---|
| Scotland (Smith) 🔨 | 1 | 0 | 2 | 0 | 0 | 0 | 0 | 0 | 0 | X | 3 |
| United States (Brown) | 0 | 1 | 0 | 0 | 0 | 0 | 0 | 0 | 0 | X | 1 |

=== Bronze medal game ===
| Sheet C | 1 | 2 | 3 | 4 | 5 | 6 | 7 | 8 | 9 | 10 | Final |
|---|---|---|---|---|---|---|---|---|---|---|---|
| Sweden (Hasselborg) 🔨 | 0 | 0 | 0 | 0 | 1 | 0 | 0 | 1 | X | X | 2 |
| United States (Brown) | 1 | 3 | 1 | 1 | 0 | 0 | 1 | 0 | X | X | 7 |

=== Final ===
| Team | 1 | 2 | 3 | 4 | 5 | 6 | 7 | 8 | 9 | 10 | Final |
|---|---|---|---|---|---|---|---|---|---|---|---|
| Scotland (Smith) 🔨 | 0 | 1 | 0 | 0 | 0 | 0 | 0 | 0 | 2 | 0 | 3 |
| Canada (Lukowich) | 0 | 0 | 0 | 0 | 0 | 0 | 2 | 1 | 0 | 1 | 4 |

1986 Hexagon World Men's Curling Championship
(Canada)
Canada
17th title

== Awards ==
- Colin Campbell Award: Uli Sutor (Germany)
