= Hansjörg Lips =

Swiss curler

- Curler ♂
- Born: 10 April 1963 (age 63)

Team
- Curling club: CC Lausanne Olympique, Lausanne

Curling career
- Member Association: Switzerland
- European Championship: 1 (1994)
- Olympic: 1 (1988; demo)
Medal record
Curling
Winter Olympics
Silver medal – second place	1988 Calgary (demonstration)
European Championships
Silver medal – second place	1994 Sundsvall

Hansjörg Lips (born 10 April 1963) is a former Swiss curler.

He played skip on the Swiss rink that won a silver medal at the 1988 Winter Olympics when curling was a demonstration sport. He is also a silver medallist at the 1994 European Curling Championships.

== Teams ==
Season	Skip	Third	Second	Lead	Alternate	Coach	Events
1987–88	Hansjörg Lips	Rico Simen	Stefan Luder	Peter Lips	Mario Flückiger		WOG 1988 (demo) (silver)
1994–95	Hansjörg Lips	Stefan Luder	Peter Lips	Rico Simen	Björn Schröder	Michael Müller	ECC 1994 (silver)
