= 1983 Labatt Brier =

- Host city: Sudbury, Ontario
- Arena: Sudbury Arena
- Dates: March 6–13
- Attendance: 65,927
- Winner: Ontario
- Curling club: Avonlea CC, Don Mills, Ontario
- Skip: Ed Werenich
- Third: Paul Savage
- Second: John Kawaja
- Lead: Neil Harrison
- Finalist: Alberta (Mike Chernoff)

The 1983 Labatt Brier, Canada's national men's curling championship, was held from March 6 to 13 at the Sudbury Arena in Sudbury, Ontario.

The "Dream Team" of Ed Werenich, Paul Savage, John Kawaja and Neil Harrison representing Ontario won the event, defeating Ed Lukowich's Alberta rink (skipped by Mike Chernoff) in the final.

The 1983 Brier was the first to use wireless microphones on the players, so that CBC viewers at home could listen to the player's strategies. This meant for some amusing remarks made by some of the more colourful curlers being heard across the country. The semi-final between Ontario and British Columbia's Bernie Sparkes rink is regarded as being one of the greatest curling games in Brier history, as Werenich had to make numerous double- and triple-takeouts in the game.

== Teams ==
The teams were listed as follows:

Alberta	British Columbia	Manitoba	New Brunswick
North Hill CC, Calgary Fourth: Ed Lukowich; Skip: Mike Chernoff; Second: Neil Houston; Lead: Brent Syme	Vancouver CC, Vancouver Skip: Bernie Sparkes; Third: Jim Armstrong; Second: Al Cook; Lead: Keiven Bauer	Valour Road CC, Winnipeg Skip: Lloyd Gunnlaugson; Third: Robert Davidson; Second: Gordon Paterson; Lead: Harold Johannesson	Capital WC, Fredericton Skip: Charlie Sullivan, Sr. Third: Dave Sullivan; Second: Shelly Palk; Lead: Robert Cormier
Newfoundland	Northern Ontario	Nova Scotia	Ontario
Corner Brook CC, Corner Brook Skip: Gary Oke (Note: For Draw 14, Team Newfoundland skip Gary Oke threw third stones while third Don Ryan threw skip stones.); Third: Don Ryan; Second: Darrell Martin; Lead: Kevin Mitchell	Tarentorus CC, Sault Ste. Marie Skip: John MacFarlane; Third: Al Harnden; Second: Eric Harnden; Lead: Rich Evoy	Mayflower CC, Halifax Skip: Steve Ogden; Third: Jack Robar; Second: Robert MacDonald; Lead: Andrew Dauphinee	Avonlea CC, Don Mills Skip: Ed Werenich; Third: Paul Savage; Second: John Kawaja; Lead: Neil Harrison
Prince Edward Island	Quebec	Saskatchewan	Northwest Territories/Yukon
Crapaud Community CC, Crapaud Skip: Ted MacFadyen; Third: Bill MacFadyen; Second: Mike Coady; Lead: Sandy Foy	CC Laviolette, Trois-Rivières Skip: Denis Marchand; Third: Denis Cecil (Note: For their final five draws, Team Quebec third Denis Cecil threw second stones while second Claude Lauziere threw third stones.); Second: Claude Lauziere; Lead: Yves Barrette	Estevan CC, Estevan Skip: Kirk Ziola; Third: Jim Packet; Second: Monte Ziola; Lead: John Grundy	Yellowknife CC, Yellowknife Skip: Don Strang; Third: Stephen Moss; Second: Harry Lawrence; Lead: Robert Hale

== Map of teams ==
Provincial Winners

== Round robin standings ==
Final round robin standings

Key
Teams to Playoffs

Locale	Skip	W	L	PF	PA	EW	EL	BE	SE	S%
Alberta	Mike Chernoff	10	1	75	48	46	40	12	11	77%
Ontario	Ed Werenich	10	1	79	48	49	35	5	17	81%
British Columbia	Bernie Sparkes	8	3	63	54	48	39	9	16	77%
Nova Scotia	Steve Ogden	7	4	84	67	54	41	6	21	76%
Quebec	Denis Marchand	6	5	63	75	37	43	11	8	75%
Saskatchewan	Kirk Ziola	5	6	60	63	37	47	13	4	74%
Northern Ontario	John MacFarlane	5	6	56	53	37	37	12	9	76%
New Brunswick	Charlie Sullivan, Sr.	4	7	56	66	45	46	4	8	73%
Prince Edward Island	Ted MacFadyen	4	7	65	70	41	50	8	8	71%
Manitoba	Lloyd Gunnlaugson	3	8	51	57	37	36	13	9	72%
Northwest Territories/Yukon	Don Strang	3	8	60	80	41	50	5	10	71%
Newfoundland	Gary Oke	1	10	48	79	36	44	7	4	68%

== Round robin results ==
=== Draw 1 ===
Sheet A	1	2	3	4	5	6	7	8	9	10	Final
New Brunswick (Sullivan)	1	2	0	1	0	1	0	0	0	0	5
Nova Scotia (Ogden) 🔨	0	0	1	0	1	0	1	1	1	2	7

Sheet B	1	2	3	4	5	6	7	8	9	10	Final
Northern Ontario (MacFarlane) 🔨	0	1	0	0	1	0	0	1	1	0	4
Alberta (Chernoff)	1	0	1	0	0	0	2	0	0	3	7

Sheet C	1	2	3	4	5	6	7	8	9	10	Final
Newfoundland (Oke) 🔨	1	0	0	0	1	0	0	1	0	0	3
British Columbia (Sparkes)	0	0	0	1	0	1	1	0	0	1	4

Sheet D	1	2	3	4	5	6	7	8	9	10	Final
Manitoba (Gunnlaugson) 🔨	1	0	3	0	2	0	0	0	2	X	8
Yukon/Northwest Territories (Strang)	0	0	0	1	0	1	1	0	0	X	3

Sheet E	1	2	3	4	5	6	7	8	9	10	Final
Prince Edward Island (MacFadyen)	0	0	0	2	0	0	2	0	2	X	6
Ontario (Werenich) 🔨	2	0	2	0	0	1	0	2	0	X	7

=== Draw 2 ===
Sheet A	1	2	3	4	5	6	7	8	9	10	11	Final
Prince Edward Island (MacFadyen) 🔨	1	0	2	0	0	0	2	0	1	0	0	6
Yukon/Northwest Territories (Strang)	0	1	0	3	0	1	0	0	0	1	1	7

Sheet B	1	2	3	4	5	6	7	8	9	10	Final
British Columbia (Sparkes) 🔨	0	2	0	0	0	1	0	0	0	2	5
Manitoba (Gunnlaugson)	0	0	0	0	2	0	0	1	1	0	4

Sheet C	1	2	3	4	5	6	7	8	9	10	Final
Nova Scotia (Ogden)	0	0	1	0	1	0	1	0	X	X	3
Ontario (Werenich) 🔨	3	4	0	1	0	2	0	1	X	X	11

Sheet D	1	2	3	4	5	6	7	8	9	10	Final
New Brunswick (Sullivan)	0	2	0	1	0	1	0	2	0	X	6
Newfoundland (Oke) 🔨	1	0	0	0	1	0	1	0	1	X	4

Sheet E	1	2	3	4	5	6	7	8	9	10	Final
Quebec (Marchand) 🔨	0	0	1	0	1	0	2	0	2	2	8
Saskatchewan (Ziola)	0	1	0	1	0	2	0	3	0	0	7

=== Draw 3 ===
Sheet C	1	2	3	4	5	6	7	8	9	10	Final
British Columbia (Sparkes) 🔨	0	1	0	1	0	1	1	0	0	X	4
New Brunswick (Sullivan)	0	0	1	0	1	0	0	1	0	X	3

Sheet D	1	2	3	4	5	6	7	8	9	10	11	Final
Newfoundland (Oke)	0	0	2	0	3	0	1	0	0	0	0	6
Nova Scotia (Ogden) 🔨	0	1	0	0	0	2	0	0	2	1	1	7

=== Draw 4 ===
Sheet A	1	2	3	4	5	6	7	8	9	10	Final
Newfoundland (Oke)	0	1	0	0	0	0	0	0	X	X	1
Manitoba (Gunnlaugson) 🔨	2	0	0	0	1	3	2	1	X	X	9

Sheet B	1	2	3	4	5	6	7	8	9	10	Final
Ontario (Werenich) 🔨	1	0	2	1	1	2	1	0	X	X	8
Quebec (Marchand)	0	2	0	0	0	0	0	1	X	X	3

Sheet C	1	2	3	4	5	6	7	8	9	10	Final
Yukon/Northwest Territories (Strang)	0	0	2	0	1	0	0	0	0	0	3
Alberta (Chernoff) 🔨	0	1	0	2	0	0	1	1	1	2	8

Sheet D	1	2	3	4	5	6	7	8	9	10	Final
Prince Edward Island (MacFadyen) 🔨	2	0	1	0	1	1	0	1	0	X	6
Saskatchewan (Ziola)	0	1	0	2	0	0	1	0	1	X	5

Sheet E	1	2	3	4	5	6	7	8	9	10	Final
British Columbia (Sparkes)	0	1	1	0	0	2	0	2	0	X	6
Northern Ontario (MacFarlane) 🔨	1	0	0	0	1	0	1	0	1	X	4

=== Draw 5 ===
Sheet A	1	2	3	4	5	6	7	8	9	10	Final
Alberta (Chernoff)	0	3	0	2	1	0	0	1	0	0	7
Ontario (Werenich) 🔨	2	0	1	0	0	1	0	0	1	1	6

Sheet B	1	2	3	4	5	6	7	8	9	10	Final
Saskatchewan (Ziola)	0	1	0	0	1	0	3	0	1	X	6
Yukon/Northwest Territories (Strang) 🔨	1	0	0	1	0	1	0	1	0	X	4

Sheet C	1	2	3	4	5	6	7	8	9	10	Final
Quebec (Marchand)	0	2	1	0	1	0	2	0	2	1	9
Prince Edward Island (MacFadyen) 🔨	3	0	0	2	0	1	0	2	0	0	8

Sheet D	1	2	3	4	5	6	7	8	9	10	Final
Nova Scotia (Ogden) 🔨	2	0	1	1	0	2	3	0	1	X	10
Northern Ontario (MacFarlane)	0	2	0	0	0	0	0	2	0	X	4

Sheet E	1	2	3	4	5	6	7	8	9	10	Final
Manitoba (Gunnlaugson) 🔨	2	3	0	1	0	2	0	0	1	X	9
New Brunswick (Sullivan)	0	0	1	0	1	0	2	0	0	X	4

=== Draw 6 ===
Sheet B	1	2	3	4	5	6	7	8	9	10	Final
Manitoba (Gunnlaugson) 🔨	0	1	0	0	1	0	1	0	0	X	3
Prince Edward Island (MacFadyen)	1	0	1	0	0	2	0	0	1	X	5

Sheet C	1	2	3	4	5	6	7	8	9	10	Final
Ontario (Werenich)	2	2	0	0	0	0	0	2	0	1	7
Yukon/Northwest Territories (Strang) 🔨	0	0	1	0	1	1	1	0	1	0	5

=== Draw 7 ===
Sheet A	1	2	3	4	5	6	7	8	9	10	11	Final
British Columbia (Sparkes)	0	0	0	0	1	0	3	1	1	0	1	7
Saskatchewan (Ziola) 🔨	0	0	0	2	0	3	0	0	0	1	0	6

Sheet B	1	2	3	4	5	6	7	8	9	10	Final
Newfoundland (Oke)	0	2	0	0	1	0	0	1	X	X	4
Ontario (Werenich) 🔨	2	0	1	0	0	3	2	0	X	X	8

Sheet C	1	2	3	4	5	6	7	8	9	10	Final
Northern Ontario (MacFarlane) 🔨	1	0	0	1	0	0	0	0	0	1	3
Manitoba (Gunnlaugson)	0	0	1	0	1	0	0	0	0	0	2

Sheet D	1	2	3	4	5	6	7	8	9	10	Final
Quebec (Marchand)	0	2	0	1	0	0	1	0	2	X	6
New Brunswick (Sullivan) 🔨	1	0	1	0	1	0	0	1	0	X	4

Sheet E	1	2	3	4	5	6	7	8	9	10	Final
Alberta (Chernoff)	0	0	0	1	0	2	0	1	0	1	5
Nova Scotia (Ogden) 🔨	1	0	0	0	1	0	1	0	0	0	3

=== Draw 8 ===
Sheet A	1	2	3	4	5	6	7	8	9	10	Final
Northern Ontario (MacFarlane) 🔨	0	1	5	0	0	1	0	0	X	X	7
Quebec (Marchand)	0	0	0	0	0	0	0	1	X	X	1

Sheet B	1	2	3	4	5	6	7	8	9	10	Final
Nova Scotia (Ogden) 🔨	3	1	1	1	1	1	3	0	X	X	11
Saskatchewan (Ziola)	0	0	0	0	0	0	0	1	X	X	1

Sheet C	1	2	3	4	5	6	7	8	9	10	Final
Alberta (Chernoff) 🔨	2	0	1	0	2	0	0	0	0	1	6
New Brunswick (Sullivan)	0	1	0	1	0	0	2	0	0	0	4

Sheet D	1	2	3	4	5	6	7	8	9	10	Final
Prince Edward Island (MacFadyen) 🔨	0	0	0	0	2	0	1	0	0	X	3
British Columbia (Sparkes)	0	2	1	2	0	1	0	1	1	X	8

Sheet E	1	2	3	4	5	6	7	8	9	10	Final
Newfoundland (Oke) 🔨	2	2	0	2	0	2	0	2	X	X	10
Yukon/Northwest Territories (Strang)	0	0	1	0	2	0	1	0	X	X	4

=== Draw 9 ===
Sheet C	1	2	3	4	5	6	7	8	9	10	Final
Northern Ontario (MacFarlane) 🔨	1	0	0	0	0	0	0	1	0	X	2
Saskatchewan (Ziola)	0	0	0	0	0	2	0	0	2	X	4

Sheet D	1	2	3	4	5	6	7	8	9	10	Final
Alberta (Chernoff) 🔨	0	0	3	0	2	0	0	4	X	X	9
Quebec (Marchand)	0	0	0	1	0	0	1	0	X	X	2

=== Draw 10 ===
Sheet A	1	2	3	4	5	6	7	8	9	10	Final
Nova Scotia (Ogden)	2	3	0	0	1	0	0	1	1	X	8
Prince Edward Island (MacFadyen) 🔨	0	0	0	2	1	0	2	0	0	X	5

Sheet B	1	2	3	4	5	6	7	8	9	10	Final
Yukon/Northwest Territories (Strang)	0	0	0	1	0	0	1	0	2	X	4
New Brunswick (Sullivan) 🔨	0	1	1	0	2	1	0	2	0	X	7

Sheet C	1	2	3	4	5	6	7	8	9	10	Final
Manitoba (Gunnlaugson)	1	0	0	1	1	0	1	0	X	X	4
Quebec (Marchand) 🔨	0	3	2	0	0	2	0	3	X	X	10

Sheet D	1	2	3	4	5	6	7	8	9	10	Final
Newfoundland (Oke)	0	0	0	1	0	1	0	1	X	X	3
Saskatchewan (Ziola) 🔨	0	3	1	0	3	0	3	0	X	X	10

Sheet E	1	2	3	4	5	6	7	8	9	10	Final
Ontario (Werenich) 🔨	2	0	0	0	1	0	0	1	0	1	5
British Columbia (Sparkes)	0	0	0	0	0	1	1	0	2	0	4

=== Draw 11 ===
Sheet A	1	2	3	4	5	6	7	8	9	10	11	Final
Yukon/Northwest Territories (Strang)	0	2	1	0	0	2	0	0	0	2	0	7
British Columbia (Sparkes) 🔨	1	0	0	1	2	0	2	1	0	0	1	8

Sheet B	1	2	3	4	5	6	7	8	9	10	Final
Alberta (Chernoff) 🔨	0	0	0	2	1	0	3	0	0	X	6
Newfoundland (Oke)	0	1	1	0	0	1	0	0	1	X	4

Sheet C	1	2	3	4	5	6	7	8	9	10	Final
New Brunswick (Sullivan) 🔨	0	0	1	0	0	2	0	1	0	X	4
Ontario (Werenich)	0	2	0	0	1	0	1	0	3	X	7

Sheet D	1	2	3	4	5	6	7	8	9	10	Final
Northern Ontario (MacFarlane)	0	0	0	0	0	1	0	0	2	1	4
Prince Edward Island (MacFadyen) 🔨	0	0	0	1	0	0	2	2	0	0	5

Sheet E	1	2	3	4	5	6	7	8	9	10	Final
Nova Scotia (Ogden) 🔨	1	0	1	0	2	0	4	0	2	X	10
Manitoba (Gunnlaugson)	0	1	0	2	0	1	0	1	0	X	5

=== Draw 12 ===
Sheet A	1	2	3	4	5	6	7	8	9	10	Final
Manitoba (Gunnlaugson) 🔨	1	0	0	0	1	0	1	0	0	X	3
Alberta (Chernoff)	0	2	1	0	0	3	0	0	1	X	7

Sheet B	1	2	3	4	5	6	7	8	9	10	Final
Quebec (Marchand)	1	0	0	0	0	3	0	2	1	0	7
Nova Scotia (Ogden) 🔨	0	0	2	1	1	0	2	0	0	4	10

Sheet C	1	2	3	4	5	6	7	8	9	10	Final
Yukon/Northwest Territories (Strang)	0	0	0	0	1	0	1	0	0	X	2
Northern Ontario (MacFarlane) 🔨	1	0	1	1	0	3	0	1	1	X	8

Sheet D	1	2	3	4	5	6	7	8	9	10	Final
Saskatchewan (Ziola)	0	0	2	0	1	0	2	0	1	X	6
Ontario (Werenich) 🔨	0	1	0	2	0	2	0	3	0	X	8

Sheet E	1	2	3	4	5	6	7	8	9	10	11	Final
New Brunswick (Sullivan)	0	1	0	1	1	0	0	1	0	2	1	7
Prince Edward Island (MacFadyen) 🔨	1	0	2	0	0	2	0	0	1	0	0	6

=== Draw 13 ===
Sheet A	1	2	3	4	5	6	7	8	9	10	Final
Ontario (Werenich) 🔨	0	1	0	1	0	0	1	1	2	X	6
Northern Ontario (MacFarlane)	0	0	1	0	2	1	0	0	0	X	4

Sheet B	1	2	3	4	5	6	7	8	9	10	Final
Prince Edward Island (MacFadyen) 🔨	0	2	0	0	3	0	1	1	0	X	7
Newfoundland (Oke)	0	0	0	1	0	1	0	0	1	X	3

Sheet C	1	2	3	4	5	6	7	8	9	10	Final
Saskatchewan (Ziola) 🔨	2	0	0	1	0	0	0	0	0	X	3
Manitoba (Gunnlaugson)	0	0	0	0	1	0	0	1	0	X	2

Sheet D	1	2	3	4	5	6	7	8	9	10	Final
British Columbia (Sparkes)	2	0	1	0	1	0	1	0	1	0	6
Alberta (Chernoff) 🔨	0	2	0	1	0	2	0	1	0	1	7

Sheet E	1	2	3	4	5	6	7	8	9	10	Final
Yukon/Northwest Territories (Strang) 🔨	3	2	2	0	3	0	0	0	X	X	10
Quebec (Marchand)	0	0	0	1	0	0	0	1	X	X	2

=== Draw 14 ===
Sheet A	1	2	3	4	5	6	7	8	9	10	11	Final
Saskatchewan (Ziola)	0	1	0	2	0	1	0	2	0	1	0	7
New Brunswick (Sullivan) 🔨	1	0	1	0	1	0	2	0	2	0	1	8

Sheet B	1	2	3	4	5	6	7	8	9	10	Final
Quebec (Marchand) 🔨	0	0	0	3	1	0	3	0	0	X	7
British Columbia (Sparkes)	0	0	1	0	0	1	0	2	0	X	4

Sheet C	1	2	3	4	5	6	7	8	9	10	Final
Prince Edward Island (MacFadyen)	1	0	0	3	1	0	1	0	2	0	8
Alberta (Chernoff) 🔨	0	1	3	0	0	1	0	2	0	2	9

Sheet D	1	2	3	4	5	6	7	8	9	10	Final
Yukon/Northwest Territories (Strang) 🔨	1	0	2	0	1	0	3	3	0	1	11
Nova Scotia (Ogden)	0	1	0	3	0	4	0	0	2	0	10

Sheet E	1	2	3	4	5	6	7	8	9	10	Final
Northern Ontario (MacFarlane)	0	2	0	3	0	0	4	0	1	X	10
Newfoundland (Oke) 🔨	1	0	1	0	0	3	0	1	0	X	6

=== Draw 15 ===
Sheet A	1	2	3	4	5	6	7	8	9	10	Final
Quebec (Marchand)	0	2	0	0	2	0	2	0	2	X	8
Newfoundland (Oke) 🔨	1	0	0	0	0	1	0	2	0	X	4

Sheet B	1	2	3	4	5	6	7	8	9	10	Final
New Brunswick (Sullivan)	1	0	0	1	1	0	0	1	0	X	4
Northern Ontario (MacFarlane)	0	2	2	0	0	0	2	0	0	X	6

Sheet C	1	2	3	4	5	6	7	8	9	10	Final
British Columbia (Sparkes)	0	1	0	2	1	0	0	0	2	1	7
Nova Scotia (Ogden) 🔨	1	0	1	0	0	1	1	1	0	0	5

Sheet D	1	2	3	4	5	6	7	8	9	10	Final
Ontario (Werenich)	0	2	0	2	1	1	0	X	X	X	6
Manitoba (Gunnlaugson) 🔨	1	0	0	0	0	0	1	X	X	X	2

Sheet E	1	2	3	4	5	6	7	8	9	10	Final
Saskatchewan (Ziola) 🔨	0	0	0	1	1	0	2	0	0	1	5
Alberta (Chernoff)	0	0	1	0	0	1	0	1	1	0	4

== Playoffs ==
Semifinal			Final
			1	Alberta	3
2	Ontario	6	2	Ontario	7
3	British Columbia	3

=== Semifinal ===
Sheet C	1	2	3	4	5	6	7	8	9	10	Final
Ontario (Werenich) 🔨	1	0	0	2	1	0	2	0	0	X	6
British Columbia (Sparkes)	0	1	0	0	0	1	0	0	1	X	3

Player percentages
Ontario		British Columbia	
Neil Harrison	71%	Keiven Bauer	95%
John Kawaja	83%	Al Cook	83%
Paul Savage	90%	Jim Armstrong	83%
Ed Werenich	88%	Bernie Sparkes	74%
Total	83%	Total	84%

=== Final ===
Sheet C	1	2	3	4	5	6	7	8	9	10	Final
Alberta (Chernoff)	0	1	0	1	0	0	0	1	0	0	3
Ontario (Werenich) 🔨	2	0	1	0	1	1	0	0	1	1	7

Player percentages
Alberta		Ontario	
Brent Syme	90%	Neil Harrison	90%
Neil Houston	88%	John Kawaja	94%
Mike Chernoff	86%	Paul Savage	90%
Ed Lukowich	67%	Ed Werenich	83%
Total	83%	Total	89%

== Statistics ==
=== Top 5 player percentages ===
Final round robin percentages

Key
All-Star Team

Leads	%
(Ontario) Neil Harrison	82
(Nova Scotia) Andrew Dauphinee	78
(Alberta) Brent Syme	78
(Saskatchewan) John Grundy	77
(Prince Edward Island) Sandy Foy	77

Seconds	%
(Ontario) John Kawaja	84
(Quebec) Claude Lauziere (Note: Lauziere's shot percentage includes the five draws where he threw third stones.)	81
(Nova Scotia) Robert MacDonald	79
(Northern Ontario) Rich Evoy	78
(Saskatchewan) Monte Ziola	76
(New Brunswick) Shelly Palk	76

Thirds	%
(Ontario) Paul Savage	80
(British Columbia) Jim Armstrong	79
(Northern Ontario) Eric Harnden	76
(Alberta) Mike Chernoff (Skip)	75
(Nova Scotia) Jack Robar	73

Skips	%
(Alberta) Ed Lukowich (Fourth)	83
(Ontario) Ed Werenich	79
(British Columbia) Bernie Sparkes	78
(Northern Ontario) Al Harnden	78
(Quebec) Denis Marchand	75
(Nova Scotia) Steve Ogden	75

== Awards ==
The awards and all-star team are listed as follows:

=== All-Star Team ===
Position	Name	Team
Skip	Ed Lukowich	Alberta
Third	Paul Savage	Ontario
Second	John Kawaja	Ontario
Lead	Neil Harrison	Ontario

=== Ross Harstone Sportsmanship Award ===
The Ross Harstone Sportsmanship Award is presented to the player chosen by their fellow peers as the curler who best represented Harstone's high ideals of good sportsmanship, observance of the rules, exemplary conduct and curling ability.

Name	Position	Team
Jim Armstrong	Third	British Columbia
