= Gord Paterson =

Canadian football player and curler

Profile
- Position: Slotback

Personal information
- Born: September 7, 1950 (age 76); Winnipeg, Manitoba
- Listed height: 5 ft 11 in (1.80 m)
- Listed weight: 185 lb (84 kg)

Career information
- University: Manitoba

Career history
- 1974–1979: Winnipeg Blue Bombers
- 1979–1981: Hamilton Tiger-Cats

Awards and highlights
- Dr. Beattie Martin Trophy (1977); CFL West All-Star (1977)

Gordon A. "Gord" Paterson (born September 7, 1950 in Winnipeg, Manitoba) is a former slotback who played eight seasons in the Canadian Football League for the Winnipeg Blue Bombers and the Hamilton Tiger-Cats. He won the Dr. Beattie Martin Trophy in 1977 for the most outstanding Canadian player in the western division.

Paterson was also a curler, representing Manitoba at the 1983 Labatt Brier.
