= 2025 Canadian Olympic Curling Trials =

- Host city: Halifax, Nova Scotia
- Arena: Scotiabank Centre
- Dates: November 22–29
- Attendance: 109,185
- Men's winner: (Alberta) Team Jacobs
- Curling club: The Glencoe Club, Calgary
- Skip: Brad Jacobs
- Third: Marc Kennedy
- Second: Brett Gallant
- Lead: Ben Hebert
- Alternate: Mike Caione
- Coach: Paul Webster
- Finalist: (Manitoba) Matt Dunstone
- Women's winner: (Ontario) Team Homan
- Curling club: Ottawa CC, Ottawa
- Skip: Rachel Homan
- Third: Tracy Fleury
- Second: Emma Miskew
- Lead: Sarah Wilkes
- Alternate: Rachelle Brown
- Coach: Heather Nedohin
- Finalist: (Nova Scotia) Christina Black

The 2025 Canadian Olympic Curling Trials (branded as the 2025 Montana's Canadian Curling Trials for sponsorship reasons) were held from November 22 to 29 at the Scotiabank Centre in Halifax, Nova Scotia. The winners of the men's and women's events represented Canada at the 2026 Winter Olympics.

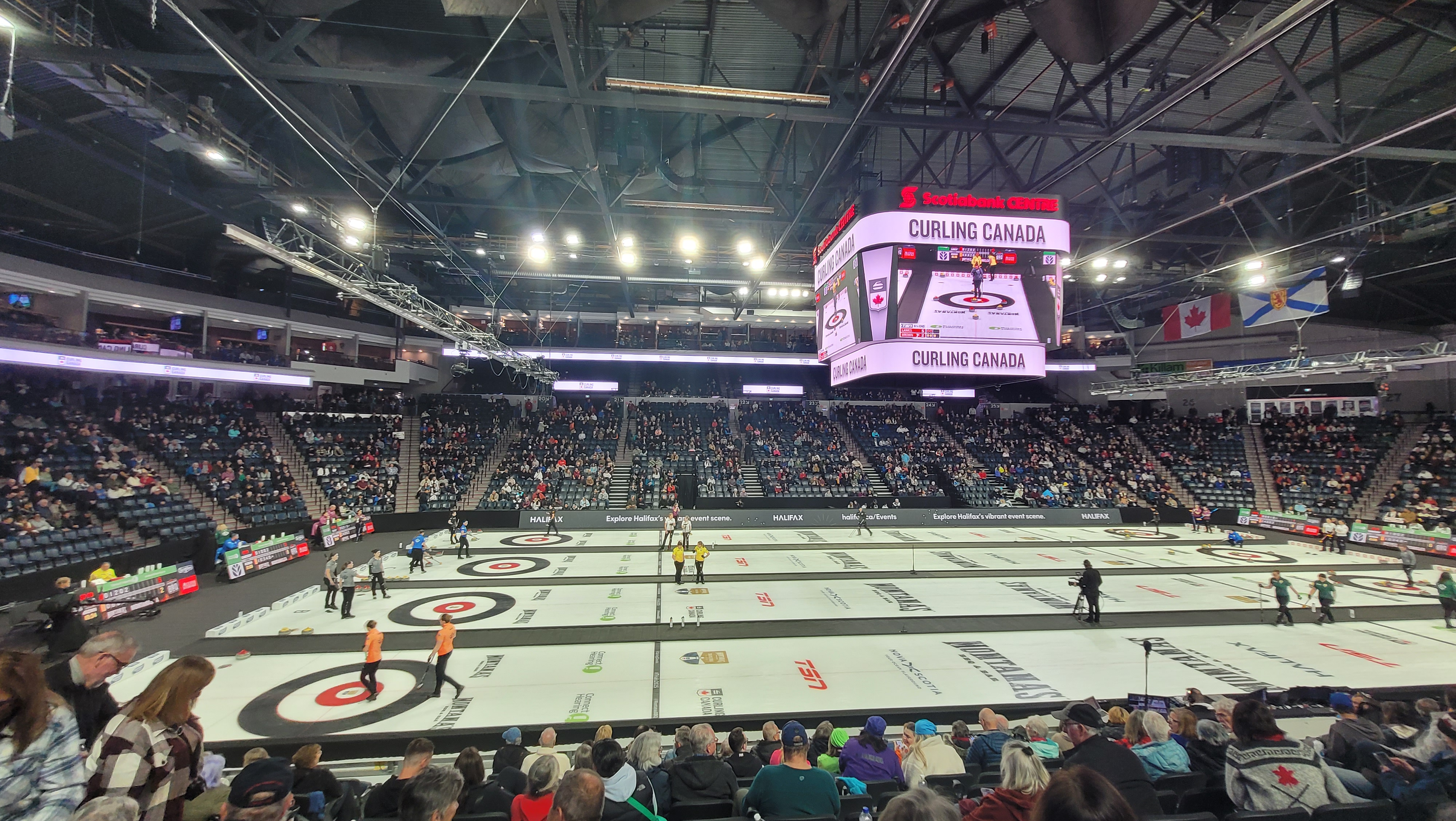
Opening Game on November 22.

== Changes to competition format ==
For the first time since 2013, the Olympic Trials returned to an eight-team format with teams qualifying either through national championship berths or CTRS standings. The final spot in both fields was decided by the pre-trials event held in October. In April 2023, it was announced that the tournament finals will introduce a best-of-three format.

== Qualification process ==
=== Men ===
Qualification method	Qualifying team	Scenario if team has already qualified
Winner of the 2024 Montana's Brier	(Newfoundland and Labrador) Brad Gushue	None (first qualifier)
CTRS Leader for 2023–24	(Alberta) Brad Jacobs	Next team on the 2023–24 CTRS not already qualified
Winner of the 2025 Montana's Brier	(Manitoba) Matt Dunstone	Next team on the 2024–25 CTRS not already qualified
CTRS Leader for 2023–25 (two-year total)	(Saskatchewan) Mike McEwen	Next team on the 2023–25 CTRS not already qualified
CTRS Leader for 2023–25 (two-year total)	(Alberta) Kevin Koe	Next team on the 2023–25 CTRS not already qualified
CTRS Leader for 2023–25 (two-year total)	(Saskatchewan) Rylan Kleiter	Next team on the 2023–25 CTRS not already qualified
CTRS Leader for 2024–25	(Ontario) John Epping	Next team on the 2024–25 CTRS not already qualified
Pre-Trials Winner	(Manitoba) Jordon McDonald	(None)

=== Women ===
Qualification method	Qualifying team	Scenario if team has already qualified
Winner of the 2024 Scotties Tournament of Hearts	(Ontario) Rachel Homan	None (first qualifier)
CTRS Leader for 2023–24 (Note: Spot was initially given to Team Chelsea Carey, however, the team disbanded during the 2024–25 season. The spot was then given to Team Kerri Einarson, the next highest ranked team on the CTRS standings.)	(Manitoba) Kerri Einarson	Next team on the 2023–24 CTRS not already qualified
Winner of the 2025 Scotties Tournament of Hearts	(Alberta) Kayla Skrlik	Next team on the 2024–25 CTRS not already qualified
CTRS Leader for 2023–25 (two-year total)	(Manitoba) Kaitlyn Lawes	Next team on the 2023–25 CTRS not already qualified
CTRS Leader for 2023–25 (two-year total)	(Manitoba) Kate Cameron	Next team on the 2023–25 CTRS not already qualified
CTRS Leader for 2023–25 (two-year total)	(Nova Scotia) Christina Black	Next team on the 2023–25 CTRS not already qualified
CTRS Leader for 2024–25	(British Columbia) Corryn Brown	Next team on the 2024–25 CTRS not already qualified
Pre-Trials Winner	(Alberta) Selena Sturmay	(None)

== Men ==
=== Teams ===
Skip	Third	Second	Lead	Alternate	Club
Matt Dunstone	Colton Lott	E. J. Harnden	Ryan Harnden		Granite CC, Winnipeg, Manitoba
John Epping	Jacob Horgan	Tanner Horgan	Ian McMillan	Pat Janssen	Northern Credit Union CC, Sudbury, Ontario
Brad Gushue	Mark Nichols	Brendan Bottcher	Geoff Walker	Adam Casey	St. John's CC, St. John's, Newfoundland and Labrador
Brad Jacobs	Marc Kennedy	Brett Gallant	Ben Hebert	Mike Caione	The Glencoe Club, Calgary, Alberta
Rylan Kleiter	Joshua Mattern	Matthew Hall	Trevor Johnson		Nutana CC, Saskatoon, Saskatchewan
Kevin Koe	Tyler Tardi	Aaron Sluchinski	Karrick Martin	Mike Libbus	The Glencoe Club, Calgary, Alberta
Jordon McDonald	Jacques Gauthier	Elias Huminicki	Cameron Olafson	Rob Gordon	Assiniboine Memorial CC, Winnipeg, Manitoba
Mike McEwen	Colton Flasch	Kevin Marsh	Dan Marsh	Brent Laing	Nutana CC, Saskatoon, Saskatchewan

=== Round robin standings ===
Final Round Robin Standings.

Key
Teams to Playoffs

Team	W	L	W–L	PF	PA	EW	EL	BE	SE	S%	DSC
(Alberta) Brad Jacobs	6	1	–	41	25	27	19	11	6	89%	13.93
(Saskatchewan) Mike McEwen	5	2	–	50	46	30	28	6	4	86%	21.02
(Manitoba) Matt Dunstone	4	3	1–0	41	37	27	24	12	6	89%	26.29
(Newfoundland and Labrador) Brad Gushue	4	3	0–1	46	41	31	29	6	3	89%	19.67
(Ontario) John Epping	3	4	1–0	42	42	26	30	5	1	91%	16.35
(Alberta) Kevin Koe	3	4	0–1	36	46	24	28	3	3	84%	56.04
(Saskatchewan) Rylan Kleiter	2	5	–	43	50	27	30	5	2	86%	54.74
(Manitoba) Jordon McDonald	1	6	–	38	50	28	31	4	2	84%	28.79

Round Robin Summary Table
Pos.	Team	(Manitoba) DUN	(Ontario) EPP	(Newfoundland and Labrador) GUS	(Alberta) JAC	(Saskatchewan) KLE	(Alberta) KOE	(Manitoba) MCD	(Saskatchewan) MCE	Record
3	(Ontario) Matt Dunstone	—	6–3	9–7	2–6	7–3	4–5	8–4	5–9	4–3
6	(Ontario) John Epping	3–6	—	3–5	4–6	7–10	8–4	8–6	9–5	3–4
4	(Newfoundland and Labrador) Brad Gushue	7–9	5–3	—	3–6	11–5	5–3	8–6	7–9	4–3
1	(Alberta) Brad Jacobs	6–2	6–4	6–3	—	6–4	5–6	6–3	6–3	6–1
8	(Saskatchewan) Rylan Kleiter	3–7	10–7	5–11	4–6	—	8–3	6–7	7–9	2–5
5	(Alberta) Kevin Koe	5–4	4–8	3–5	6–5	3–8	—	8–7	7–9	3–4
7	(Manitoba) Jordon McDonald	4–8	6–8	6–8	3–6	7–6	7–8	—	5–6	1–6
2	(Saskatchewan) Mike McEwen	9–5	5–9	9–7	3–6	9–7	9–7	6–5	—	5–2

=== Round robin results ===
All draw times are listed in Atlantic Time (UTC−04:00).

==== Draw 2 ====
Saturday, November 22, 7:00 pm

Sheet A	1	2	3	4	5	6	7	8	9	10	Final
(Saskatchewan) Mike McEwen	0	2	0	1	0	1	0	0	0	2	6
(Manitoba) Jordon McDonald 🔨	2	0	1	0	1	0	1	0	0	0	5

Sheet B	1	2	3	4	5	6	7	8	9	10	Final
(Manitoba) Matt Dunstone	0	1	0	2	0	0	0	0	2	1	6
(Ontario) John Epping 🔨	0	0	2	0	0	1	0	0	0	0	3

Sheet C	1	2	3	4	5	6	7	8	9	10	Final
(Alberta) Kevin Koe	0	0	0	2	0	2	0	1	0	1	6
(Alberta) Brad Jacobs 🔨	0	2	0	0	2	0	1	0	0	0	5

Sheet D	1	2	3	4	5	6	7	8	9	10	Final
(Saskatchewan) Rylan Kleiter	0	0	1	0	0	2	0	2	0	X	5
(Newfoundland and Labrador) Brad Gushue 🔨	0	2	0	3	0	0	3	0	3	X	11

==== Draw 4 ====
Sunday, November 23, 2:00 pm

Sheet A	1	2	3	4	5	6	7	8	9	10	11	Final
(Alberta) Brad Jacobs 🔨	0	0	2	0	1	0	0	1	0	0	2	6
(Saskatchewan) Rylan Kleiter	0	0	0	1	0	0	1	0	0	2	0	4

Sheet B	1	2	3	4	5	6	7	8	9	10	Final
(Alberta) Kevin Koe	0	1	0	0	0	1	0	0	1	0	3
(Newfoundland and Labrador) Brad Gushue 🔨	1	0	0	1	0	0	0	2	0	1	5

Sheet C	1	2	3	4	5	6	7	8	9	10	Final
(Ontario) John Epping 🔨	1	0	1	0	2	0	1	0	4	X	9
(Saskatchewan) Mike McEwen	0	2	0	1	0	1	0	1	0	X	5

Sheet D	1	2	3	4	5	6	7	8	9	10	Final
(Manitoba) Matt Dunstone 🔨	0	0	2	0	0	0	2	0	3	1	8
(Manitoba) Jordon McDonald	0	0	0	1	0	2	0	1	0	0	4

==== Draw 6 ====
Monday, November 24, 9:00 am

Sheet A	1	2	3	4	5	6	7	8	9	10	Final
(Newfoundland and Labrador) Brad Gushue 🔨	0	1	1	0	1	1	0	1	0	X	5
(Ontario) John Epping	0	0	0	1	0	0	1	0	1	X	3

Sheet B	1	2	3	4	5	6	7	8	9	10	Final
(Saskatchewan) Rylan Kleiter	0	0	1	0	0	1	0	1	X	X	3
(Manitoba) Matt Dunstone 🔨	2	1	0	2	1	0	1	0	X	X	7

Sheet C	1	2	3	4	5	6	7	8	9	10	Final
(Manitoba) Jordon McDonald 🔨	0	2	0	2	0	1	0	1	0	1	7
(Alberta) Kevin Koe	0	0	2	0	2	0	1	0	3	0	8

Sheet D	1	2	3	4	5	6	7	8	9	10	Final
(Saskatchewan) Mike McEwen	0	0	1	0	0	0	0	2	0	X	3
(Alberta) Brad Jacobs 🔨	0	2	0	1	0	0	0	0	3	X	6

==== Draw 8 ====
Monday, November 24, 7:00 pm

Sheet A	1	2	3	4	5	6	7	8	9	10	Final
(Alberta) Kevin Koe	0	3	0	1	0	1	0	0	2	0	7
(Saskatchewan) Mike McEwen 🔨	2	0	1	0	2	0	0	3	0	1	9

Sheet B	1	2	3	4	5	6	7	8	9	10	Final
(Alberta) Brad Jacobs	0	0	0	2	0	1	2	0	1	X	6
(Manitoba) Jordon McDonald 🔨	0	1	0	0	1	0	0	1	0	X	3

Sheet C	1	2	3	4	5	6	7	8	9	10	11	Final
(Manitoba) Matt Dunstone	0	2	0	1	0	0	3	0	1	0	2	9
(Newfoundland and Labrador) Brad Gushue 🔨	1	0	1	0	0	1	0	2	0	2	0	7

Sheet D	1	2	3	4	5	6	7	8	9	10	Final
(Ontario) John Epping 🔨	1	0	2	0	1	0	2	0	1	0	7
(Saskatchewan) Rylan Kleiter	0	2	0	2	0	1	0	3	0	2	10

==== Draw 10 ====
Tuesday, November 25, 2:00 pm

Sheet A	1	2	3	4	5	6	7	8	9	10	11	Final
(Manitoba) Jordon McDonald	0	2	0	2	0	1	0	0	0	1	0	6
(Newfoundland and Labrador) Brad Gushue 🔨	2	0	2	0	1	0	0	1	0	0	2	8

Sheet B	1	2	3	4	5	6	7	8	9	10	Final
(Saskatchewan) Mike McEwen	0	1	5	0	1	0	1	0	1	X	9
(Saskatchewan) Rylan Kleiter 🔨	1	0	0	3	0	1	0	2	0	X	7

Sheet C	1	2	3	4	5	6	7	8	9	10	Final
(Alberta) Brad Jacobs 🔨	2	0	0	0	0	2	0	1	0	1	6
(Ontario) John Epping	0	2	0	0	0	0	0	0	2	0	4

Sheet D	1	2	3	4	5	6	7	8	9	10	Final
(Alberta) Kevin Koe 🔨	1	0	0	2	0	0	0	0	0	2	5
(Manitoba) Matt Dunstone	0	2	0	0	0	0	0	1	1	0	4

==== Draw 12 ====
Wednesday, November 26, 9:00 am

Sheet A	1	2	3	4	5	6	7	8	9	10	Final
(Manitoba) Matt Dunstone 🔨	0	0	1	0	0	0	1	0	0	0	2
(Alberta) Brad Jacobs	0	0	0	2	0	1	0	1	0	2	6

Sheet B	1	2	3	4	5	6	7	8	9	10	Final
(Ontario) John Epping 🔨	0	0	3	0	4	0	0	0	1	X	8
(Alberta) Kevin Koe	0	1	0	1	0	1	1	0	0	X	4

Sheet C	1	2	3	4	5	6	7	8	9	10	Final
(Saskatchewan) Rylan Kleiter	0	0	2	0	2	0	1	0	0	1	6
(Manitoba) Jordon McDonald 🔨	0	2	0	1	0	1	0	2	1	0	7

Sheet D	1	2	3	4	5	6	7	8	9	10	Final
(Newfoundland and Labrador) Brad Gushue	0	2	1	0	2	0	0	0	2	0	7
(Saskatchewan) Mike McEwen 🔨	2	0	0	1	0	3	1	1	0	1	9

==== Draw 14 ====
Wednesday, November 26, 7:00 pm

Sheet A	1	2	3	4	5	6	7	8	9	10	Final
(Saskatchewan) Rylan Kleiter 🔨	0	2	0	1	0	0	1	3	1	X	8
(Alberta) Kevin Koe	0	0	2	0	1	0	0	0	0	X	3

Sheet B	1	2	3	4	5	6	7	8	9	10	Final
(Newfoundland and Labrador) Brad Gushue 🔨	1	0	0	1	0	1	0	0	0	0	3
(Alberta) Brad Jacobs	0	0	1	0	2	0	0	1	1	1	6

Sheet C	1	2	3	4	5	6	7	8	9	10	Final
(Saskatchewan) Mike McEwen	0	3	2	0	3	0	1	0	X	X	9
(Manitoba) Matt Dunstone 🔨	2	0	0	1	0	1	0	1	X	X	5

Sheet D	1	2	3	4	5	6	7	8	9	10	Final
(Manitoba) Jordon McDonald	0	3	0	1	0	0	1	0	1	0	6
(Ontario) John Epping 🔨	1	0	2	0	2	1	0	1	0	1	8

=== Playoffs ===
Semifinal
2	(Saskatchewan) Mike McEwen	5
3	(Manitoba) Matt Dunstone	9

Finals
1	(Alberta) Brad Jacobs	9	6	X
3	(Manitoba) Matt Dunstone	8	5	X

==== Semifinal ====
Thursday, November 27, 7:00 pm

Sheet B	1	2	3	4	5	6	7	8	9	10	Final
(Saskatchewan) Mike McEwen 🔨	1	0	2	0	1	0	0	1	0	0	5
(Manitoba) Matt Dunstone	0	1	0	2	0	3	0	0	2	1	9

Player percentages
(Saskatchewan) Team McEwen		(Manitoba) Team Dunstone	
Dan Marsh	96%	Ryan Harnden	100%
Kevin Marsh	75%	E. J. Harnden	89%
Colton Flasch	88%	Colton Lott	89%
Mike McEwen	84%	Matt Dunstone	93%
Total	86%	Total	93%

==== Finals ====
===== Game 1 =====
Friday, November 28, 7:00 pm

Sheet B	1	2	3	4	5	6	7	8	9	10	Final
(Alberta) Brad Jacobs 🔨	1	2	0	2	0	2	0	0	0	2	9
(Manitoba) Matt Dunstone	0	0	2	0	4	0	0	0	2	0	8

Player percentages
(Alberta) Team Jacobs		(Manitoba) Team Dunstone	
Ben Hebert	95%	Ryan Harnden	96%
Brett Gallant	84%	E. J. Harnden	80%
Marc Kennedy	91%	Colton Lott	86%
Brad Jacobs	79%	Matt Dunstone	78%
Total	87%	Total	85%

===== Game 2 =====
Saturday, November 29, 7:00 pm

Sheet B	1	2	3	4	5	6	7	8	9	10	Final
(Alberta) Brad Jacobs 🔨	1	1	0	1	0	0	2	0	0	1	6
(Manitoba) Matt Dunstone	0	0	2	0	0	1	0	1	1	0	5

Player percentages
(Alberta) Team Jacobs		(Manitoba) Team Dunstone	
Ben Hebert	96%	Ryan Harnden	96%
Brett Gallant	81%	E. J. Harnden	85%
Marc Kennedy	88%	Colton Lott	89%
Brad Jacobs	91%	Matt Dunstone	91%
Total	89%	Total	90%

=== Top 5 player percentages ===
After Round Robin

Leads	%
(Ontario) Ian McMillan	96
(Manitoba) Ryan Harnden	95
(Alberta) Karrick Martin	91
(Alberta) Ben Hebert	91
(Manitoba) Cameron Olafson	91
(Newfoundland and Labrador) Geoff Walker	91

Seconds	%
(Ontario) Tanner Horgan	91
(Newfoundland and Labrador) Brendan Bottcher	88
(Saskatchewan) Kevin Marsh	87
(Manitoba) E. J. Harnden	86
(Saskatchewan) Joshua Mattern	85

Thirds	%
(Manitoba) Colton Lott	92
(Alberta) Marc Kennedy	91
(Ontario) Jacob Horgan	90
(Newfoundland and Labrador) Mark Nichols	90
(Manitoba) Jacques Gauthier	85

Skips	%
(Alberta) Brad Jacobs	91
(Newfoundland and Labrador) Brad Gushue	89
(Ontario) John Epping	85
(Saskatchewan) Rylan Kleiter	84
(Saskatchewan) Mike McEwen	84

== Women ==
=== Teams ===
Skip	Third	Second	Lead	Alternate	Club
Christina Black	Jill Brothers	Jenn Baxter	Karlee Everist	Marlee Powers	Halifax CC, Halifax, Nova Scotia
Corryn Brown	Erin Pincott	Sarah Koltun	Samantha Fisher	Tracey Bilsky	Kamloops CC, Kamloops, British Columbia
Kate Cameron	Briane Harris	Taylor McDonald	Mackenzie Elias		St. Adolphe CC, St. Adolphe, Manitoba
Kerri Einarson	Val Sweeting	Shannon Birchard	Karlee Burgess	Krysten Karwacki	Gimli CC, Gimli, Manitoba
Rachel Homan	Tracy Fleury	Emma Miskew	Sarah Wilkes	Rachelle Brown	Ottawa CC, Ottawa, Ontario
Kaitlyn Lawes	Selena Njegovan (skip)	Jocelyn Peterman	Kristin Gordon	Laura Walker	Heather CC, Winnipeg, Manitoba
Kayla Skrlik	Margot Flemming	Ashton Skrlik	Geri-Lynn Ramsay	Crystal Rumberg	Garrison CC, Calgary, Alberta
Selena Sturmay	Danielle Schmiemann	Dezaray Hawes	Paige Papley		Saville Community SC, Edmonton, Alberta

=== Round robin standings ===
Final Round Robin Standings

Key
Teams to Playoffs

Team	W	L	W–L	PF	PA	EW	EL	BE	SE	S%	DSC
(Ontario) Rachel Homan	6	1	1–0	68	36	34	24	4	14	90%	25.38
(Manitoba) Kerri Einarson	6	1	0–1	54	34	32	24	7	13	85%	22.19
(Nova Scotia) Christina Black	4	3	1–1	46	47	28	28	3	7	80%	34.77
(Alberta) Selena Sturmay	4	3	1–1	57	47	34	29	1	10	83%	38.56
(Manitoba) Kaitlyn Lawes	4	3	1–1	43	41	29	28	3	7	81%	42.31
(Alberta) Kayla Skrlik	2	5	–	39	49	23	28	4	5	79%	24.11
(Manitoba) Kate Cameron	1	6	1–0	38	59	27	29	7	8	78%	35.58
(British Columbia) Corryn Brown	1	6	0–1	26	58	20	36	2	3	80%	35.95

Round Robin Summary Table
Pos.	Team	(Nova Scotia) BLA	(British Columbia) BRO	(Manitoba) CAM	(Manitoba) EIN	(Ontario) HOM	(Manitoba) LAW	(Alberta) SKR	(Alberta) STU	Record
3	(Nova Scotia) Christina Black	—	9–4	10–6	5–12	2–8	7–3	6–5	7–9	4–3
8	(British Columbia) Corryn Brown	4–9	—	3–8	1–9	3–10	4–7	7–6	4–9	1–6
7	(Manitoba) Kate Cameron	6–10	8–3	—	5–6	5–16	3–5	6–7	5–12	1–6
2	(Manitoba) Kerri Einarson	12–5	9–1	6–5	—	6–7	6–4	6–5	9–7	6–1
1	(Ontario) Rachel Homan	8–2	10–3	16–5	7–6	—	8–7	7–8	12–5	6–1
5	(Manitoba) Kaitlyn Lawes	3–7	7–4	5–3	4–6	7–8	—	9–6	8–7	4–3
6	(Alberta) Kayla Skrlik	5–6	6–7	7–6	5–6	8–7	6–9	—	2–8	2–5
4	(Alberta) Selena Sturmay	9–7	9–4	12–5	7–9	5–12	7–8	8–2	—	4–3

=== Round robin results ===
All draw times are listed in Atlantic Time (UTC−04:00).

==== Draw 1 ====
Saturday, November 22, 2:00 pm

Sheet A	1	2	3	4	5	6	7	8	9	10	Final
(Alberta) Kayla Skrlik 🔨	0	0	0	1	1	0	0	0	X	X	2
(Alberta) Selena Sturmay	0	1	2	0	0	2	2	1	X	X	8

Sheet B	1	2	3	4	5	6	7	8	9	10	Final
(Manitoba) Kaitlyn Lawes 🔨	0	1	2	0	2	0	1	0	1	0	7
(British Columbia) Corryn Brown	0	0	0	2	0	1	0	0	0	1	4

Sheet C	1	2	3	4	5	6	7	8	9	10	Final
(Manitoba) Kate Cameron 🔨	0	1	0	0	2	0	2	0	X	X	5
(Ontario) Rachel Homan	1	0	3	4	0	6	0	2	X	X	16

Sheet D	1	2	3	4	5	6	7	8	9	10	Final
(Nova Scotia) Christina Black 🔨	0	0	0	1	0	0	0	4	X	X	5
(Manitoba) Kerri Einarson	2	4	0	0	2	1	3	0	X	X	12

==== Draw 3 ====
Sunday, November 23, 9:00 am

Sheet A	1	2	3	4	5	6	7	8	9	10	Final
(Ontario) Rachel Homan 🔨	0	1	2	3	0	1	1	0	X	X	8
(Nova Scotia) Christina Black	0	0	0	0	1	0	0	1	X	X	2

Sheet B	1	2	3	4	5	6	7	8	9	10	Final
(Manitoba) Kate Cameron 🔨	0	0	0	0	1	0	1	1	1	1	5
(Manitoba) Kerri Einarson	1	1	1	2	0	1	0	0	0	0	6

Sheet C	1	2	3	4	5	6	7	8	9	10	Final
(British Columbia) Corryn Brown 🔨	0	2	0	0	0	2	0	2	0	1	7
(Alberta) Kayla Skrlik	1	0	2	1	1	0	0	0	1	0	6

Sheet D	1	2	3	4	5	6	7	8	9	10	11	Final
(Manitoba) Kaitlyn Lawes	0	4	1	0	0	1	0	0	1	0	1	8
(Alberta) Selena Sturmay 🔨	1	0	0	1	1	0	1	2	0	1	0	7

==== Draw 5 ====
Sunday, November 23, 7:00 pm

Sheet A	1	2	3	4	5	6	7	8	9	10	Final
(Manitoba) Kerri Einarson 🔨	1	1	0	0	2	1	2	2	X	X	9
(British Columbia) Corryn Brown	0	0	1	0	0	0	0	0	X	X	1

Sheet B	1	2	3	4	5	6	7	8	9	10	Final
(Nova Scotia) Christina Black 🔨	0	2	1	0	0	0	1	0	3	X	7
(Manitoba) Kaitlyn Lawes	0	0	0	1	1	0	0	1	0	X	3

Sheet C	1	2	3	4	5	6	7	8	9	10	Final
(Alberta) Selena Sturmay 🔨	0	2	0	1	0	1	3	0	5	X	12
(Manitoba) Kate Cameron	1	0	1	0	1	0	0	2	0	X	5

Sheet D	1	2	3	4	5	6	7	8	9	10	11	Final
(Alberta) Kayla Skrlik	0	1	0	2	0	1	0	0	3	0	1	8
(Ontario) Rachel Homan 🔨	1	0	1	0	1	0	0	1	0	3	0	7

==== Draw 7 ====
Monday, November 24, 2:00 pm

Sheet A	1	2	3	4	5	6	7	8	9	10	Final
(Manitoba) Kate Cameron 🔨	1	0	1	0	1	0	2	1	0	0	6
(Alberta) Kayla Skrlik	0	1	0	1	0	3	0	0	0	2	7

Sheet B	1	2	3	4	5	6	7	8	9	10	Final
(Ontario) Rachel Homan 🔨	3	0	5	2	0	0	1	1	X	X	12
(Alberta) Selena Sturmay	0	2	0	0	2	1	0	0	X	X	5

Sheet C	1	2	3	4	5	6	7	8	9	10	Final
(Manitoba) Kaitlyn Lawes	0	0	1	0	0	1	0	1	1	X	4
(Manitoba) Kerri Einarson 🔨	0	2	0	0	3	0	1	0	0	X	8

Sheet D	1	2	3	4	5	6	7	8	9	10	Final
(British Columbia) Corryn Brown	0	0	1	0	0	2	1	0	0	X	4
(Nova Scotia) Christina Black 🔨	1	1	0	3	1	0	0	1	2	X	9

==== Draw 9 ====
Tuesday, November 25, 9:00 am

Sheet A	1	2	3	4	5	6	7	8	9	10	Final
(Alberta) Selena Sturmay	0	1	0	2	0	1	0	1	0	2	7
(Manitoba) Kerri Einarson 🔨	1	0	1	0	2	0	1	0	4	0	9

Sheet B	1	2	3	4	5	6	7	8	9	10	Final
(Alberta) Kayla Skrlik 🔨	1	0	0	1	2	0	1	0	0	0	5
(Nova Scotia) Christina Black	0	2	0	0	0	1	0	1	1	1	6

Sheet C	1	2	3	4	5	6	7	8	9	10	Final
(Ontario) Rachel Homan 🔨	3	1	0	2	0	1	3	0	X	X	10
(British Columbia) Corryn Brown	0	0	1	0	1	0	0	1	X	X	3

Sheet D	1	2	3	4	5	6	7	8	9	10	Final
(Manitoba) Kate Cameron	0	1	1	0	0	0	0	0	1	X	3
(Manitoba) Kaitlyn Lawes 🔨	1	0	0	0	3	0	0	1	0	X	5

==== Draw 11 ====
Tuesday, November 25, 7:00 pm

Sheet A	1	2	3	4	5	6	7	8	9	10	Final
(Manitoba) Kaitlyn Lawes 🔨	0	0	1	0	0	2	3	0	0	1	7
(Ontario) Rachel Homan	2	1	0	0	2	0	0	2	1	0	8

Sheet B	1	2	3	4	5	6	7	8	9	10	Final
(British Columbia) Corryn Brown 🔨	0	0	1	0	0	0	2	0	0	0	3
(Manitoba) Kate Cameron	0	2	0	0	0	2	0	0	2	2	8

Sheet C	1	2	3	4	5	6	7	8	9	10	Final
(Nova Scotia) Christina Black	0	0	1	0	2	0	2	0	2	0	7
(Alberta) Selena Sturmay 🔨	0	1	0	1	0	3	0	2	0	2	9

Sheet D	1	2	3	4	5	6	7	8	9	10	Final
(Manitoba) Kerri Einarson 🔨	0	0	0	1	0	2	0	2	0	1	6
(Alberta) Kayla Skrlik	0	0	0	0	2	0	2	0	1	0	5

==== Draw 13 ====
Wednesday, November 26, 2:00 pm

Sheet A	1	2	3	4	5	6	7	8	9	10	Final
(Nova Scotia) Christina Black 🔨	2	0	0	1	0	2	0	2	0	3	10
(Manitoba) Kate Cameron	0	0	3	0	0	0	1	0	2	0	6

Sheet B	1	2	3	4	5	6	7	8	9	10	Final
(Manitoba) Kerri Einarson	0	1	0	0	3	0	0	0	1	1	6
(Ontario) Rachel Homan 🔨	0	0	2	1	0	2	0	2	0	0	7

Sheet C	1	2	3	4	5	6	7	8	9	10	Final
(Alberta) Kayla Skrlik	0	2	0	2	0	1	0	1	0	0	6
(Manitoba) Kaitlyn Lawes 🔨	2	0	1	0	1	0	1	0	0	4	9

Sheet D	1	2	3	4	5	6	7	8	9	10	Final
(Alberta) Selena Sturmay	1	0	1	2	0	1	0	0	4	X	9
(British Columbia) Corryn Brown 🔨	0	1	0	0	1	0	1	1	0	X	4

=== Playoffs ===
Semifinal
2	(Manitoba) Kerri Einarson	3
3	(Nova Scotia) Christina Black	6

Finals
1	(Ontario) Rachel Homan	5	12	X
3	(Nova Scotia) Christina Black	4	3	X

==== Semifinal ====
Thursday, November 27, 1:00 pm

Sheet B	1	2	3	4	5	6	7	8	9	10	Final
(Manitoba) Kerri Einarson 🔨	0	1	0	0	1	0	1	0	0	X	3
(Nova Scotia) Christina Black	1	0	0	1	0	1	0	0	3	X	6

Player percentages
(Manitoba) Team Einarson		(Nova Scotia) Team Black	
Karlee Burgess	83%	Karlee Everist	80%
Shannon Birchard	80%	Marlee Powers	79%
Val Sweeting	74%	Jill Brothers	69%
Kerri Einarson	75%	Christina Black	90%
Total	78%	Total	79%

==== Finals ====
===== Game 1 =====
Friday, November 28, 1:00 pm

Sheet B	1	2	3	4	5	6	7	8	9	10	Final
(Ontario) Rachel Homan 🔨	0	1	1	1	0	1	0	0	1	0	5
(Nova Scotia) Christina Black	0	0	0	0	1	0	1	1	0	1	4

Player percentages
(Ontario) Team Homan		(Nova Scotia) Team Black	
Sarah Wilkes	86%	Karlee Everist	89%
Emma Miskew	65%	Jenn Baxter	76%
Tracy Fleury	86%	Jill Brothers	83%
Rachel Homan	74%	Christina Black	74%
Total	78%	Total	80%

===== Game 2 =====
Saturday, November 29, 1:00 pm

Sheet B	1	2	3	4	5	6	7	8	9	10	Final
(Ontario) Rachel Homan 🔨	2	0	4	1	2	0	2	1	X	X	12
(Nova Scotia) Christina Black	0	2	0	0	0	1	0	0	X	X	3

Player percentages
(Ontario) Team Homan		(Nova Scotia) Team Black	
Sarah Wilkes	95%	Karlee Everist	92%
Emma Miskew	88%	Marlee Powers	81%
Tracy Fleury	86%	Jill Brothers	78%
Rachel Homan	95%	Christina Black	58%
Total	91%	Total	77%

=== Top 5 player percentages ===
After Round Robin

Leads	%
(Ontario) Sarah Wilkes	93
(British Columbia) Samantha Fisher	91
(Manitoba) Karlee Burgess	90
(Manitoba) Kristin Gordon	87
(Alberta) Paige Papley	86

Seconds	%
(Ontario) Emma Miskew	92
(Alberta) Dezaray Hawes	84
(Manitoba) Shannon Birchard	82
(Alberta) Ashton Skrlik	81
(British Columbia) Sarah Koltun	80

Thirds	%
(Ontario) Tracy Fleury	90
(Manitoba) Val Sweeting	87
(Alberta) Danielle Schmiemann	83
(Manitoba) Selena Njegovan	82
(British Columbia) Erin Pincott	81

Skips	%
(Ontario) Rachel Homan	86
(Manitoba) Kerri Einarson	82
(Alberta) Selena Sturmay	80
(Nova Scotia) Christina Black	76
(Manitoba) Kate Cameron	75

== Pre-Trials ==
The Home Hardware Pre-Trials were held from October 20 to 26 at the Andrew H. McCain Arena in Wolfville, Nova Scotia.

=== Men ===
==== Teams ====
Skip	Third	Second	Lead	Alternate	Club
Braden Calvert	Corey Chambers	Kyle Kurz	Brendan Bilawka		Fort Rouge CC, Winnipeg, Manitoba
Scott Howard	Mat Camm	Jason Camm	Scott Chadwick		Navan CC, Navan, Ontario
Mark Kean	Brady Lumley	Matthew Garner	Spencer Dunlop	Connor Lawes	Woodstock CC, Woodstock, Ontario
Jayden King (Note: Spot was initially give to Team Reid Carruthers, however, they withdrew from the pre-trials due to Carruthers' coaching commitments with Team Kerri Einarson. They were replaced with Team Jayden King, the top-ranked men's team in the CTRS yet to qualify.)	Dylan Niepage	Owen Henry	Victor Pietrangelo		London CC, London, Ontario
Jordon McDonald	Jacques Gauthier	Elias Huminicki	Cameron Olafson		Assiniboine Memorial CC, Winnipeg, Manitoba
Félix Asselin (Fourth)	Jean-Michel Ménard (Skip)	Martin Crête	Jean-François Trépanier		Glenmore CC, Dollard-des-Ormeaux, Quebec
Sam Mooibroek	Ryan Wiebe	Scott Mitchell	Nathan Steele	Wyatt Small	Whitby CC, Whitby, Ontario
Owen Purcell	Luke Saunders	Gavin Lydiate	Ryan Abraham		Halifax CC, Halifax, Nova Scotia

==== Round robin standings ====
Final Round Robin Standings

Key
Teams to Playoffs

Team	W	L	W–L	PF	PA	EW	EL	BE	SE	S%	DSC
(Manitoba) Braden Calvert	5	2	1–0	50	41	29	27	5	6	86%	261.0
(Manitoba) Jordon McDonald	5	2	0–1	54	45	32	27	2	9	87%	450.3
(Ontario) Scott Howard	4	3	2–0	46	37	27	26	4	7	82%	154.5
(Ontario) Jayden King	4	3	1–1	53	54	30	29	3	10	84%	319.6
(Quebec) Jean-Michel Ménard	4	3	0–2	48	42	29	26	8	2	88%	202.1
(Ontario) Sam Mooibroek	3	4	1–0	47	49	31	28	3	7	81%	451.6
(Nova Scotia) Owen Purcell	3	4	0–1	42	57	25	32	9	1	81%	316.0
(Ontario) Mark Kean	0	7	–	40	55	27	35	3	4	80%	449.7

Round Robin Summary Table
Pos.	Team	(Manitoba) CAL	(Ontario) HOW	(Ontario) KEA	(Ontario) KIN	(Manitoba) MCD	(Quebec) MEN	(Ontario) MOO	(Nova Scotia) PUR	Record
1	(Ontario) Braden Calvert	—	8–6	9–5	12–9	8–4	2–7	6–4	5–6	5–2
3	(Ontario) Scott Howard	6–8	—	6–3	9–4	2–8	7–4	4–5	12–5	4–3
8	(Ontario) Mark Kean	5–9	3–6	—	6–7	5–6	5–8	9–10	7–9	0–7
4	(Ontario) Jayden King	9–12	4–9	7–6	—	6–11	10–8	9–5	8–3	4–3
2	(Manitoba) Jordon McDonald	4–8	8–2	6–5	11–6	—	6–9	10–8	9–7	5–2
5	(Quebec) Jean-Michel Ménard	7–2	4–7	8–5	8–10	9–6	—	6–5	6–7	4–3
6	(Ontario) Sam Mooibroek	4–6	5–4	10–9	5–9	8–10	5–6	—	10–5	3–4
7	(Nova Scotia) Owen Purcell	6–5	5–12	9–7	3–8	7–9	7–6	5–10	—	3–4

==== Playoffs ====
Semifinal
2	(Manitoba) Jordon McDonald	5
3	(Ontario) Scott Howard	4

Finals
1	(Manitoba) Braden Calvert	5	8	5
2	(Manitoba) Jordon McDonald	10	5	8

===== Semifinal =====
Friday, October 24, 9:00 am

Sheet C	1	2	3	4	5	6	7	8	9	10	Final
(Manitoba) Jordon McDonald 🔨	0	2	0	0	0	0	0	1	1	1	5
(Ontario) Scott Howard	0	0	2	1	0	1	0	0	0	0	4

===== Finals =====
====== Game 1 ======
Friday, October 24, 7:00 pm

Sheet C	1	2	3	4	5	6	7	8	9	10	Final
(Manitoba) Braden Calvert 🔨	1	0	2	0	1	0	1	0	X	X	5
(Manitoba) Jordon McDonald	0	3	0	2	0	1	0	4	X	X	10

====== Game 2 ======
Saturday, October 25, 2:00 pm

Sheet C	1	2	3	4	5	6	7	8	9	10	Final
(Manitoba) Braden Calvert	0	1	1	0	2	0	1	2	1	X	8
(Manitoba) Jordon McDonald 🔨	0	0	0	3	0	2	0	0	0	X	5

====== Game 3 ======
Sunday, October 26, 11:00 am

Sheet C	1	2	3	4	5	6	7	8	9	10	Final
(Manitoba) Braden Calvert	0	2	0	0	1	0	0	2	0	X	5
(Manitoba) Jordon McDonald 🔨	2	0	2	0	0	0	2	0	2	X	8

=== Women ===
==== Teams ====
Skip	Third	Second	Lead	Alternate	Club
Danielle Inglis	Kira Brunton	Calissa Daly	Cassandra de Groot	Kim Tuck	Ottawa Hunt & GC, Ottawa, Ontario
Kayla MacMillan	Brittany Tran	Lindsay Dubue	Sarah Loken	Lauren Lenentine	Victoria CC, Victoria, British Columbia
Nancy Martin	Chaelynn Kitz	Kadriana Lott	Christie Gamble		Nutana CC, Saskatoon, Saskatchewan
Beth Peterson	Kelsey Calvert	Katherine Remillard	Melissa Gordon-Kurz		Assiniboine Memorial CC, Winnipeg, Manitoba
Myla Plett	Alyssa Nedohin	Chloe Fediuk	Allie Iskiw	Abby Whitbread	Saville Community SC, Edmonton, Alberta
Krista Scharf	Kendra Lilly	Ashley Sippala	Sarah Potts		Fort William CC, Thunder Bay, Ontario
Selena Sturmay	Danielle Schmiemann	Dezaray Hawes	Paige Papley		Saville Community SC, Edmonton, Alberta
Ashley Thevenot	Stephanie Schmidt	Taylor Stremick	Kaylin Skinner	Susan O'Connor	Nutana CC, Saskatoon, Saskatchewan

==== Round robin standings ====
Final Round Robin Standings

Key
Teams to Playoffs

Team	W	L	W–L	PF	PA	EW	EL	BE	SE	S%	DSC
(Alberta) Selena Sturmay	5	2	1–0	56	38	35	27	0	12	85%	553.6
(British Columbia) Kayla MacMillan	5	2	0–1	43	36	28	24	10	6	84%	366.3
(Saskatchewan) Ashley Thevenot	4	3	1–0	40	47	27	28	5	9	78%	506.9
(Ontario) Danielle Inglis	4	3	0–1	55	52	33	32	2	11	79%	500.8
(Alberta) Myla Plett	3	4	1–0	48	49	31	29	1	9	79%	325.0
(Ontario) Krista Scharf	3	4	0–1	35	47	26	32	3	7	78%	502.0
(Saskatchewan) Nancy Martin	2	5	1–0	45	51	27	33	3	6	78%	408.7
(Manitoba) Beth Peterson	2	5	0–1	45	47	29	31	2	10	80%	337.5

Round Robin Summary Table
Pos.	Team	(Ontario) ING	(British Columbia) MAC	(Saskatchewan) MAR	(Manitoba) PET	(Alberta) PLE	(Ontario) SCH	(Alberta) STU	(Saskatchewan) THE	Record
4	(Ontario) Danielle Inglis	—	7–9	8–5	8–6	9–8	7–8	9–8	7–8	4–3
2	(British Columbia) Kayla MacMillan	9–7	—	6–4	7–6	4–5	8–2	2–10	7–2	5–2
7	(Saskatchewan) Nancy Martin	5–8	4–6	—	11–7	11–6	3–8	6–7	5–9	2–5
8	(Manitoba) Beth Peterson	6–8	6–7	7–11	—	10–4	6–7	3–8	7–2	2–5
5	(Alberta) Myla Plett	8–9	5–4	6–11	4–10	—	10–2	10–5	5–8	3–4
6	(Ontario) Krista Scharf	8–7	2–8	8–3	7–6	2–10	—	3–7	5–6	3–4
1	(Alberta) Selena Sturmay	8–9	10–2	7–6	8–3	5–10	7–3	—	11–5	5–2
3	(Saskatchewan) Ashley Thevenot	8–7	2–7	9–5	2–7	8–5	6–5	5–11	—	4–3

==== Playoffs ====
Semifinal
2	(British Columbia) Kayla MacMillan	6
3	(Saskatchewan) Ashley Thevenot	4

Finals
1	(Alberta) Selena Sturmay	8	9	9
2	(British Columbia) Kayla MacMillan	5	10	4

===== Semifinal =====
Friday, October 24, 2:00 pm

Sheet C	1	2	3	4	5	6	7	8	9	10	Final
(British Columbia) Kayla MacMillan 🔨	0	0	2	0	0	1	2	0	1	X	6
(Saskatchewan) Ashley Thevenot	0	0	0	0	2	0	0	2	0	X	4

===== Finals =====
====== Game 1 ======
Saturday, October 25, 9:00 am

Sheet C	1	2	3	4	5	6	7	8	9	10	Final
(Alberta) Selena Sturmay 🔨	0	1	0	2	1	0	3	0	1	X	8
(British Columbia) Kayla MacMillan	0	0	2	0	0	2	0	1	0	X	5

====== Game 2 ======
Saturday, October 25, 7:00 pm

Sheet C	1	2	3	4	5	6	7	8	9	10	Final
(Alberta) Selena Sturmay 🔨	2	0	1	0	2	0	0	1	2	1	9
(British Columbia) Kayla MacMillan	0	1	0	2	0	2	5	0	0	0	10

====== Game 3 ======
Sunday, October 26, 4:00 pm

Sheet C	1	2	3	4	5	6	7	8	9	10	Final
(Alberta) Selena Sturmay	0	2	1	1	2	0	3	0	X	X	9
(British Columbia) Kayla MacMillan 🔨	1	0	0	0	0	1	0	2	X	X	4
