= Penny Shantz =

Canadian curler

- Curler ♀
- Other names: Penny Ryan
- Born: May 23, 1960 (age 66); Edmonton, Alberta, Canada

Team
- Curling club: Vernon CC, Vernon, BC

Curling career
- Member Association: Alberta (–1989); British Columbia (1989–present)
- Hearts: 2: (1983, 1989)
- Olympic: 1 (1988) (demo)
Medal record
Curling
Representing Canada
Olympic Games (demonstration)
Gold medal – first place	1988 Calgary	Women's
Representing British Columbia
Scott Tournament of Hearts
Silver medal – second place	1983 Prince George
Canadian Olympic Curling Trials
Gold medal – first place	1987 Calgary

Penny Shantz (also known as Penny Ryan and Penny Shantz-Henderson; born May 23, 1960) is a Canadian curler.

She competed at the 1988 Winter Olympics when curling was a demonstration sport. The Canadian women's team won the gold medal, defeating Sweden in the final.

In the 1980s, she was married to famous Canadian curler Pat Ryan, World and Brier champion.

== Teams ==
Season	Skip	Third	Second	Lead	Alternate	Events
1982	Ruby Sowinski	Deb Lewis	Penny Ryan	Bonnie Bower		
1982–83	Cathy Shaw	Christine Jurgenson	Sandra Rippel	Penny Ryan		STOH 1983 (silver)
1987–88	Linda Moore	Lindsay Sparkes	Debbie Jones	Penny Ryan	Patti Vande (OG)	COCT 1987 (gold); OG 1988 (gold)
1988–89	Debbie Shermack	Penny Ryan	Diane Alexander	Twyla Pruden	Sandra Rippel	STOH 1989 (8th)
1989–90	Kerrylyn Richard	Penny Ryan	Susan Auty	Iris Nielson	Sandra Jenkins	
2002–03	Marilyn Bodogh	Theresa Breen	Susan Froud	Sara Gatchell	Penny Shantz	CC 2003 (T-7th)
2004–05	Penny Shantz	Kerrylyn Richard	Elizabeth Folk	Sandra Jenkins		
2006–07	Penny Shantz	Sandra Jenkins	Sherry Heath	Susan Hamilton		
2007	Sandra Jenkins	Penny Shantz	Susan Hamilton	Sherry Heath	Brittany Rouck	
2011–12	Penny Shantz	Debbie Jones-Walker	Deborah Pulak	Shirley Wong		CSCC 2012 (10th)
2012–13	Penny Shantz	Sandra Jenkins	Kate Horne	Sherry Heath		
2013–14	Penny Shantz	Sandra Jenkins	Debbie Pulak	Kate Horne		CSCC 2014 (7th)
2014–15	Penny Shantz	Sandra Jenkins	Colleen Robson	Kate Horne		
2016–17	Lynne Noble	Penny Shantz	Colleen Robson	Kathy Branch		CSCC 2017 (bronze)
2017–18	Lynne Noble	Penny Shantz	Colleen Robson	Karen Lepine		CSCC 2018 (4th)
2018–19	Sandra Jenkins	Penny Shantz	Colleen Robson	Kate Horne		
2020–21	Mary-Anne Arsenault	Penny Shantz	Diane Gushulak	Grace MacInnis		CSCC 2021 (silver)
2021	Penny Shantz	Tina Chestnut	Nicole Guizzo	Nancy Betteridge		CCCC 2021
2022	Penny Shantz	Cindy Curtain	Shirley Wong	Janet Suter		CMCC 2022 (gold)
2023	Penny Shantz	Cindy Curtain	Shirley Wong	Janet Suter		CMCC 2023 (gold)
2024	Penny Shantz	Cindy Curtain	Danielle Shaughnessy	Donna Mychaluk		CMCC 2024 (gold)
