= Kirk Ziola =

Canadian curler

Kirk D. J. Ziola is a Canadian curler from London, Ontario.

Ziola is originally from Regina, Saskatchewan, and in 1983 won the provincial championship. His rink from Estevan, Saskatchewan represented the province at the 1983 Labatt Brier, where they finished with a 5-6 record.

Ziola moved to Ayr, Ontario in the 1980s. He played in the 1987 Canadian Olympic Curling Trials, skipping his rink to a 3-4 record.
