= Wayne Hart (curler) =

Canadian curler

- Curler ♂
- Born: February 13, 1949 (age 77); Vauxhall, Alberta, Canada

Team
- Curling club: Calgary CC, Calgary, AB, Calgary Winter Club, Calgary, AB

Curling career
- Member Association: Alberta
- Brier: 1: (1986)
- World Championship: 1 (1986)
- Olympic: 1 (1988) (demo)
Medal record
Curling
Representing Canada
Olympics
Bronze medal – third place	1988 Calgary (demonstration)
World Championships
Gold medal – first place	1986 Toronto
Representing Alberta
Labatt Brier
Gold medal – first place	1986 Kitchener

Wayne Hart (born February 13, 1949) is a Canadian curler.

He is a 1986 World Men's champion and a 1986 Labatt Brier champion.

He played at the 1988 Winter Olympics when curling was a demonstration sport, Canadian men's team won bronze medal.

== Teams ==
Season	Skip	Third	Second	Lead	Alternate	Events
1967–68	Wayne Hart	J. Lockhart	Clair Lillies	Paul Feuz		
1975–76	Bob LeGoffe	Stan Gill	Wayne Hart	Don Bruins		
1978–79	Wally Geisbrecht	Stan Gill	Wayne Hart	Don Bruins		
1980–81	Ed Lukowich	John Ferguson	Wayne Hart	Doug McFarlane		
1981–82	Ed Lukowich	Mike Chernoff (skip)	John Ferguson	Wayne Hart		
1982–83	Paul Gowsell	John Ferguson	Wayne Hart	Neil Sherrington		
1982–83	Lyle Davis	Paul Gowsell	Wayne Hart	Randy Brucker		
1982–83	Paul Gowsell	Lyle Davis	Wayne Hart	Neil Sherrington		
1984–85	Ed Lukowich	John Ferguson	Neil Houston	Wayne Hart		
1985–86	Ed Lukowich	John Ferguson	Neil Houston	Brent Syme	Wayne Hart	Brier 1986 (gold); WCC 1986 (gold)
1985–86	Gary Marks	Bob Dickson	Stan Miller	Wayne Hart		
1986–87	Ed Lukowich	John Ferguson	Neil Houston	Brent Syme	Wayne Hart	
1987–88	Ed Lukowich	John Ferguson	Neil Houston	Brent Syme	Wayne Hart	WOG 1988 (bronze)
1987–88	Paul Gowsell	Danny Fink	Kelly Stearne	Wayne Hart		
1988–89	Danny Fink	Jim Koury	Roy Hebert	Wayne Hart		
1989–90	Dennis Graber	Stacey Coomber	Todd Maxwell	Wayne Hart		
1990–91	Dave Fisher	Wayne Hart	Kent Strudwick	Vaughn Rycroft		
1991–92	Dave Fisher	Wayne Hart	Rod Kramer	Todd Maxwell		
1992–93	Troy Wylie	Brent Syme	Wayne Hart	?		
1993–94	Wes Aman	Lorne Niven	Dale Craig	Wayne Hart		
1996–97	John Ferguson	Dan Hall	Wayne Hart	Steve Smith		
1998–99	Ed Lukowich	John Ferguson	Rob Stephenson	Wayne Hart		
