= Curling at the 1988 Winter Olympics =

Curling at the XV Olympic Winter Games
- Venue: Max Bell Arena

Men's curling at the XV Olympic Winter Games

Medalists
1st place, gold medalist(s)		Norway
2nd place, silver medalist(s)		Switzerland
3rd place, bronze medalist(s)		Canada

Women's curling at the XV Olympic Winter Games

Medalists
1st place, gold medalist(s)		Canada
2nd place, silver medalist(s)		Sweden
3rd place, bronze medalist(s)		Norway

Curling was a demonstration sport at the 1988 Winter Olympics. The venue was the Max Bell Arena in Calgary. The 1988 Winter Olympics was the second time curling was a demonstration sport at the Winter Games, previously being competed at the 1932 Olympics.

== Medal summary ==
=== Medal table ===
Rank	Nation	Gold	Silver	Bronze	Total
1	Canada	1	0	1	2
1	Norway	1	0	1	2
3	Sweden	0	1	0	1
3	Switzerland	0	1	0	1
Totals (4 entries)		2	2	2	6

=== Medalists ===
Games	Gold	Silver	Bronze
Men's	Norway; Eigil Ramsfjell; Sjur Loen; Morten Søgaard; Bo Bakke; Gunnar Meland	Switzerland; Hans-Jürg Lips; Rico Simen; Stefan Luder; Peter Lips; Mario Flückiger	Canada; Ed Lukowich; John Ferguson; Neil Houston; Brent Syme; Wayne Hart
Women's	Canada; Linda Moore; Lindsay Sparkes; Debbie Jones; Penny Ryan; Patti Vande	Sweden; Elisabeth Högström; Monika Jansson; Birgitta Sewik; Marie Henriksson; Anette Norberg	Norway; Trine Trulsen; Dordi Nordby; Hanne Pettersen; Mette Halvorsen; Marianne Aspelin

== Men ==
=== Teams ===
Canada	Denmark	West Germany	Great Britain
Calgary Winter Club, Alberta Skip: Ed Lukowich; Third: John Ferguson; Second: Neil Houston; Lead: Brent Syme; Alternate: Wayne Hart	Hvidovre CC Skip: Gert Larsen; Third: Oluf Olsen; Second: Jan Hansen; Lead: Michael Harry	EV Füssen Skip: Andreas "Andy" Kapp; Third: Florian Zörgiebel; Second: Cristopher Huber; Lead: Michael Schäffer; Alternate: Dieter Kolb	St. Martins CC, Perth Skip: David Smith; Third: Hammy McMillan; Second: Mike Hay; Lead: Peter Smith
Norway	Sweden	Switzerland	United States
Snaøren CC, Oslo Skip: Eigil Ramsfjell; Third: Sjur Loen; Second: Morten Søgaard; Lead: Bo Bakke; Alternate: Gunnar Meland	Härnösands CK Skip: Dan-Ola Eriksson; Third: Anders Thidholm; Second: Jonas Sjölander; Lead: Christer Nylund; Alternate: Sören Grahn	Skip: Hans-Jürg Lips; Third: Rico Simen; Second: Stefan Luder; Lead: Peter Lips; Alternate: Mario Flückiger	Superior CC, Wisconsin Fourth: Bob Nichols; Skip: Raymond "Bud" Somerville*; Second: Tom Locken; Lead: Bob Christman; Alternate: Bill Strum

*throws third stones

=== Standings ===
Place	Team	Wins	Losses
1	Switzerland	5	2
2	Canada	5	2
3	Norway	4	3
4	United States	4	3
5	Sweden	4	3
6	Denmark	3	4
7	West Germany	3	4
8	Great Britain	0	7

=== Round robin results ===
==== Draw 1 ====
Team	Final
West Germany (Kapp)	9
Sweden (Eriksson)	4

Team	Final
United States (Somerville)	6
Denmark (Larsen)	5

Team	Final
Switzerland (Lips)	4
Canada (Lukowich)	3

Team	Final
Norway (Ramsfjell)	4
Great Britain (Smith)	3

==== Draw 2 ====
Team	Final
Norway (Ramsfjell)	8
Denmark (Larsen)	4

Team	Final
Sweden (Eriksson)	7
Switzerland (Lips)	3

Team	Final
West Germany (Kapp)	7
Great Britain (Smith)	4

Team	Final
Canada (Lukowich)	9
United States (Somerville)	5

==== Draw 3 ====
Team	Final
Switzerland (Lips)	4
Great Britain (Smith)	2

Team	Final
Canada (Lukowich)	9
Norway (Ramsfjell)	7

Team	Final
United States (Somerville)	10
Sweden (Eriksson)	6

Team	Final
Denmark (Larsen)	6
West Germany (Kapp)	2

==== Draw 4 ====
Team	Final
Norway (Ramsfjell)	4
Sweden (Eriksson)	3

Team	Final
Canada (Lukowich)	9
West Germany (Kapp)	1

Team	Final
Denmark (Larsen)	6
Switzerland (Lips)	2

Team	Final
United States (Somerville)	7
Great Britain (Smith)	6

==== Draw 5 ====
Team	Final
Denmark (Larsen)	8
Great Britain (Smith)	3

Team	Final
Sweden (Eriksson)	8
Canada (Lukowich)	7

Team	Final
Norway (Ramsfjell)	7
West Germany (Kapp)	5

Team	Final
Switzerland (Lips)	7
United States (Somerville)	4

==== Draw 6 ====
Team	Final
West Germany (Kapp)	7
United States (Somerville)	6

Team	Final
Switzerland (Lips)	7
Norway (Ramsfjell)	2

Team	Final
Canada (Lukowich)	6
Great Britain (Smith)	4

Team	Final
Sweden (Eriksson)	9
Denmark (Larsen)	1

==== Draw 7 ====
Team	Final
Sweden (Eriksson)	6
Great Britain (Smith)	5

Team	Final
Canada (Lukowich)	9
Denmark (Larsen)	5

Team	Final
United States (Somerville)	9
Norway (Ramsfjell)	3

Team	Final
Switzerland (Lips)	6
West Germany (Kapp)	5

=== Tie-breakers ===
Team	Final
Norway (Ramsfjell)	6
Sweden (Eriksson)	4

Team	Final
Norway (Ramsfjell)	6
United States (Somerville)	3

=== Playoffs ===
Semifinal			Final
			1	Switzerland	2
2	Canada	5	3	Norway	10
3	Norway	8

==== Semifinal ====
Team	Final
Canada (Lukowich)	5
Norway (Ramsfjell)	8

==== Gold medal match ====
Team	Final
Switzerland (Lips)	2
Norway (Ramsfjell)	10

== Women ==
=== Teams ===
Canada	Sweden	Norway	West Germany
North Shore Winter Club, Vancouver, BC Skip: Linda Moore; Third: Lindsay Sparkes; Second: Debbie Jones; Lead: Penny Ryan; Alternate: Patti Vande	Karlstads CK Skip: Elisabeth Högström; Third: Monika Jansson; Second: Birgitta Sewik; Lead: Marie Henriksson; Alternate: Anette Norberg	Snaøren CC, Oslo Skip: Trine Trulsen; Third: Dordi Nordby; Second: Hanne Pettersen; Lead: Mette Halvorsen; Alternate: Marianne Aspelin	SC Riessersee, Garmisch-Partenkirchen Skip: Andrea Schöpp; Third: Almut Hege-Schöll; Second: Monika Wagner; Lead: Suzanne Fink
United States	Denmark	Switzerland	France
Madison CC, Wisconsin Skip: Lisa Schoeneberg; Third: Erika Brown; Second: Carla Casper; Lead: Lori Mountford	Hvidovre CC, Hvidovre Skip: Helena Blach; Third: Malene Krause; Second: Lone Kristoffersen; Lead: Lene Nielsen	Bern Egghölzi Damen CC, Bern Skip: Cristina Lestander; Third: Barbara Meier; Second: Christina Gartenmann; Lead: Katrin Peterhans	Megève CC, Megève Skip: Annick Mercier; Third: Agnès Mercier; Second: Andrée Dupont-Roc; Lead: Catherine Lefebvre

=== Standings ===
Place	Team	Wins	Losses
1	Sweden	5	2
2	Canada	5	2
3	Norway	4	3
4	West Germany	4	3
5	United States	4	3
6	Denmark	3	4
7	Switzerland	2	5
8	France	1	6

=== Round robin results ===
==== Draw 1 ====
Team	Final
Sweden (Högström)	10
United States (Schoeneberg)	2

Team	Final
Canada (Moore)	4
West Germany (Schöpp)	3

Team	Final
Denmark (Blach)	6
Switzerland (Lestander)	5

Team	Final
Norway (Trulsen)	6
France (Mercier)	3

==== Draw 2 ====
Team	Final
Denmark (Blach)	7
France (Mercier)	5

Team	Final
Switzerland (Lestander)	7
Norway (Trulsen)	4

Team	Final
Canada (Moore)	7
United States (Schoeneberg)	5

Team	Final
Sweden (Högström)	6
West Germany (Schöpp)	5

==== Draw 3 ====
Team	Final
Canada (Moore)	6
Switzerland (Lestander)	4

Team	Final
West Germany (Schöpp)	8
Norway (Trulsen)	5

Team	Final
Sweden (Högström)	7
France (Mercier)	4

Team	Final
United States (Schoeneberg)	9
Denmark (Blach)	2

==== Draw 4 ====
Team	Final
West Germany (Schöpp)	7
Denmark (Blach)	2

Team	Final
Norway (Trulsen)	9
United States (Schoeneberg)	5

Team	Final
Switzerland (Lestander)	7
Sweden (Högström)	3

Team	Final
Canada (Moore)	10
France (Mercier)	3

==== Draw 5 ====
Team	Final
Norway (Trulsen)	9
Sweden (Högström)	2

Team	Final
Denmark (Blach)	5
Canada (Moore)	2

Team	Final
West Germany (Schöpp)	8
France (Mercier)	5

Team	Final
United States (Schoeneberg)	9
Switzerland (Lestander)	6

==== Draw 6 ====
Team	Final
United States (Schoeneberg)	5
West Germany (Schöpp)	3

Team	Final
Sweden (Högström)	6
Canada (Moore)	4

Team	Final
France (Mercier)	9
Switzerland (Lestander)	1

Team	Final
Norway (Trulsen)	7
Denmark (Blach)	2

==== Draw 7 ====
Team	Final
Canada (Moore)	9
Norway (Trulsen)	4

Team	Final
United States (Schoeneberg)	6
France (Mercier)	5

Team	Final
West Germany (Schöpp)	9
Switzerland (Lestander)	4

Team	Final
Sweden (Högström)	7
Denmark (Kapp)	2

=== Tie-breakers ===
Team	Final
Norway (Trulsen)	10
United States (Schoeneberg)	7

Team	Final
Norway (Trulsen)	8
West Germany (Schöpp)	4

=== Playoffs ===
Semifinal		Final
		Canada	7
Canada	6	Sweden	5
Norway	5

==== Semifinal ====
Team	Final
Canada (Moore)	6
Norway (Trulsen)	5

==== Gold medal match ====
Team	1	2	3	4	5	6	7	8	9	10	Final
Canada (Moore)	0	1	0	1	0	2	1	0	0	2	7
Sweden (Högström)	1	0	2	0	1	0	0	0	1	0	5
