= Ed Lukowich =

Canadian curler

- Curler
- Born: March 1, 1946; Speers, Saskatchewan, Canada

Curling career
- Brier: 5 (1978, 1983, 1984, 1986, 1994)
- World Championship: 2 (1978, 1986)
- Olympic: 1 (1988)
Medal record
Men's curling
Representing Canada
Winter Olympics
Bronze medal – third place	1988 Calgary (demonstration)
World Curling Championships
Gold medal – first place	1986 Toronto
Bronze medal – third place	1978 Winnipeg
Representing Alberta
Labatt Brier
Gold medal – first place	1978 Vancouver
Gold medal – first place	1986 Kitchener-Waterloo
Silver medal – second place	1983 Sudbury
Bronze medal – third place	1984 Victoria
Canadian Olympic Curling Trials
Gold medal – first place	1987 Calgary
Canadian Masters Curling Championships
Gold medal – first place	2016 Kentville-Wolfville

Edward R. Lukowich (born March 1, 1946; nicknamed "Cool Hand Luke") is a Canadian former champion curler. Lukowich is a two-time Brier champion, having won the Brier Tankard for Alberta as skip of both the 1978 and 1986 Canadian championship teams. His team won the 1986 World Curling Championship and placed third at 1988 Olympics when curling was a demonstration sport.

== Career ==
=== Curling ===
Born on March 1, 1946, in Speers, Saskatchewan, Lukowich was the athlete development director from 2000 to 2009 of the United States Curling Association. He coached the Pete Fenson rink at the 2010 World Championship at Cortina d'Ampezzo to a 4th-place finish.

Lukowich has written four books on curling and produced a 60-minute instructional video. He was one of the initial founders of the TSN Skins Game and a co-founder of and former executive director of the World Curling Tour. He also was the WCT colour-commentator for CTV Sportsnet.

=== Writing ===
Lukowich changed careers in 2011, becoming a science fiction writer as well as the author of 5 books (in his Trillion Theory series) relating to new theory pertaining to the age and origin of our universe.

Authored books:

- The Trillionist 2013 (science fiction novel published by EDGE).
- Trillion Theory (2015) (1st book in the Trillion Theory series).
- Trillion Years Universe Theory (2014 and 2015) (2nd book in the Trillion Theory series).
- Black Holes Built Our Cosmos (2015) (3rd book in the Trillion Theory series).
- T Theory Says: Who Owns our Universe (2016) (4th book in the Trillion Theory series).
- Spinning Black Hole Inside Our Earth (2017) (5th book in the Trillion Theory series).

== Personal life ==
A resident of Calgary, Ed is the older brother of former NHL hockey player, Morris Lukowich. His cousin is NHL player Brad Lukowich who is the son of former NHL and WHA player Bernie Lukowich.

== Sources ==
- Interview at inthehack.com
