= 2017 Canadian Junior Curling Championships – Women's tournament =

2017 Canadian Junior Curling Championships Women's tournament
- Host city: Esquimalt, British Columbia
- Arena: Archie Browning Sports Centre; Esquimalt Curling Club
- Dates: January 21–29
- Winner: Alberta
- Curling club: Saville Community Sports Centre, Edmonton
- Skip: Kristen Streifel
- Third: Chantele Broderson
- Second: Kate Goodhelpsen
- Lead: Brenna Bilassy
- Coach: Amanda Dawn St. Laurent
- Finalist: Ontario (Hailey Armstrong)

The women's tournament of the 2017 M&M Meat Shops Canadian Junior Curling Championships was held from January 21 to 29 at the Archie Browning Sports Centre and the Esquimalt Curling Club.

== Teams ==
The teams are listed as follows:

Province	Skip	Third	Second	Lead	Club(s)
Alberta	Kristen Streifel	Chantele Broderson	Kate Goodhelpsen	Brenna Bilassy	Saville Sports Centre, Edmonton
British Columbia	Corryn Brown	Marika Van Osch	Dezaray Hawes	Samantha Fisher	Kamloops Curling Club, Kamloops
Manitoba	Laura Burtnyk	Hailey Ryan	Sara Oliver	Rebecca Cormier	Assiniboine Memorial Curling Club, Winnipeg
New Brunswick	Samantha Crook	Julia Hunter	Danielle Hubbard	Kayla Russell	Capital Winter Club, Fredericton
Newfoundland and Labrador	Brooke Godsland	Megan Kearley	Gabrielle Molloy	Michelle Taylor	RE/MAX Centre, St. John's
Northwest Territories	Zoey Walsh	Julie Squires-Rowe	Nicole Griffiths	Katherine Lenoir	Hay River Curling Club, Hay River
Northern Ontario	Krysta Burns	Megan Smith	Sara Guy	Laura Masters	Idylwylde Golf & Country Club, Sudbury
Nova Scotia	Kristin Clarke	Karlee Burgess	Janique LeBlanc	Emily Lloyd	Chester Curling Club, Chester
Nunavut	Sadie Pinksen	Christianne West	Kaitlin MacDonald	Melicia Eliziaga	Iqaluit Curling Club, Iqaluit
Ontario	Hailey Armstrong	Grace Holyoke	Lindsay Dubue	Marcia Richardson	Rideau Curling Club, Ottawa
Prince Edward Island	Lauren Lenentine	Kristie Rogers	Breanne Burgoyne	Rachel O'Connor	Cornwall Curling Club, Cornwall
Saskatchewan	Kaitlyn Jones	Sara England	Rayann Zerr	Shantel Hutton	Caledonian Curling Club, Regina
Quebec	Camile Boisvert	Laura Guénard	Émilia Gagné	Isabelle Thiboutot	Club de curling Etchemin, Saint-Romuald
Yukon	Alyssa Meger	Emily Matthews	Peyton L'Henaff	Zaria Netro	Whitehorse Curling Club, Whitehorse

== Round-robin standings ==
Key
Teams to Championship Pool
Teams to Tie-Breakers

Pool A	Skip	W	L
Alberta	Kristen Streifel	5	1
Saskatchewan	Kaitlyn Jones	4	2
Prince Edward Island	Lauren Lenentine	3	3
Newfoundland and Labrador	Brooke Godsland	3	3
Nova Scotia	Kristin Clarke	3	3
Manitoba	Laura Burtnyk	2	4
Northwest Territories	Zoey Walsh	1	5

Pool B	Skip	W	L
Ontario	Hailey Armstrong	6	0
British Columbia	Corryn Brown	4	2
Quebec	Camille Boisvert	4	2
Northern Ontario	Krysta Burns	3	3
New Brunswick	Samantha Crook	3	3
Nunavut	Sadie Pinksen	1	5
Yukon	Alyssa Meger	0	6

== Round-robin results ==
All draw times are listed in Eastern Standard Time (UTC−5:00).

=== Pool A ===
==== Draw 1 ====
Sheet D	1	2	3	4	5	6	7	8	9	10	11	Final
Nova Scotia (Clarke)	0	1	0	0	1	0	1	0	0	1	0	4
Prince Edward Island (Lenentine) 🔨	1	0	0	0	0	1	0	1	1	0	2	6

Sheet G	1	2	3	4	5	6	7	8	9	10	Final
Manitoba (Burtnyk) 🔨	0	3	0	1	1	0	3	1	X	X	9
Northwest Territories (Walsh)	0	0	1	0	0	1	0	0	X	X	2

==== Draw 2 ====
Sheet A	1	2	3	4	5	6	7	8	9	10	Final
Prince Edward Island (Lenentine)	0	0	0	1	0	0	5	0	2	0	8
Saskatchewan (Jones) 🔨	0	1	2	0	2	2	0	0	0	6	13

Sheet I	1	2	3	4	5	6	7	8	9	10	Final
Alberta (Streifel) 🔨	1	0	0	0	1	0	0	1	0	X	3
Newfoundland and Labrador (Godsland)	0	0	0	3	0	1	0	0	2	X	6

==== Draw 3 ====
Sheet C	1	2	3	4	5	6	7	8	9	10	Final
Northwest Territories (Walsh) 🔨	0	0	0	0	0	0	0	0	X	X	0
Alberta (Streifel)	0	1	1	2	2	0	0	2	X	X	8

Sheet D	1	2	3	4	5	6	7	8	9	10	Final
Saskatchewan (Jones) 🔨	0	2	0	2	0	0	1	0	1	1	7
Manitoba (Burtnyk)	1	0	1	0	1	0	0	1	0	0	4

Sheet G	1	2	3	4	5	6	7	8	9	10	Final
Newfoundland and Labrador (Godsland)	0	2	2	0	2	0	0	2	2	X	10
Nova Scotia (Clarke) 🔨	1	0	0	1	0	2	2	0	0	X	6

==== Draw 4 ====
Sheet A	1	2	3	4	5	6	7	8	9	10	Final
Nova Scotia (Clarke) 🔨	0	3	0	4	0	0	1	1	X	X	9
Northwest Territories (Walsh)	1	0	1	0	1	1	0	0	X	X	4

Sheet F	1	2	3	4	5	6	7	8	9	10	Final
Alberta (Streifel) 🔨	3	0	2	0	1	1	1	0	X	X	8
Prince Edward Island (Lenentine)	0	0	0	1	0	0	0	1	X	X	2

==== Draw 5 ====
Sheet E	1	2	3	4	5	6	7	8	9	10	Final
Newfoundland and Labrador (Godsland)	0	0	0	1	0	2	0	0	X	X	3
Saskatchewan (Jones) 🔨	2	1	1	0	1	0	3	3	X	X	11

Sheet I	1	2	3	4	5	6	7	8	9	10	Final
Prince Edward Island (Lenentine) 🔨	1	0	0	0	1	0	1	0	X	X	3
Manitoba (Burtnyk)	0	0	1	1	0	4	0	2	X	X	8

==== Draw 6 ====
Sheet A	1	2	3	4	5	6	7	8	9	10	Final
Alberta (Streifel) 🔨	2	3	0	1	0	2	0	0	3	X	11
Manitoba (Burtnyk)	0	0	1	0	2	0	2	1	0	X	6

Sheet H	1	2	3	4	5	6	7	8	9	10	Final
Saskatchewan (Jones) 🔨	0	1	0	2	0	1	0	0	0	X	4
Nova Scotia (Clarke)	0	0	1	0	1	0	2	0	2	X	6

==== Draw 7 ====
Sheet C	1	2	3	4	5	6	7	8	9	10	Final
Prince Edward Island (Lenentine)	0	0	1	0	0	3	2	2	0	0	8
Newfoundland and Labrador (Godsland) 🔨	2	0	0	1	0	0	0	0	1	3	7

Sheet F	1	2	3	4	5	6	7	8	9	10	Final
Northwest Territories (Walsh)	0	0	0	0	1	0	1	0	X	X	2
Saskatchewan (Jones) 🔨	4	1	1	3	0	1	0	1	X	X	11

==== Draw 8 ====
Sheet B	1	2	3	4	5	6	7	8	9	10	Final
Nova Scotia (Clarke)	1	0	3	0	0	0	0	0	0	0	4
Alberta (Streifel) 🔨	0	2	0	2	0	0	1	0	0	2	7

==== Draw 9 ====
Sheet E	1	2	3	4	5	6	7	8	9	10	Final
Northwest Territories (Walsh) 🔨	0	0	1	0	2	0	2	0	1	0	6
Prince Edward Island (Lenentine)	2	0	0	2	0	2	0	1	0	2	9

Sheet F	1	2	3	4	5	6	7	8	9	10	Final
Manitoba (Burtnyk) 🔨	1	1	0	1	0	1	0	1	1	0	6
Newfoundland and Labrador (Godsland)	0	0	1	0	2	0	3	0	0	1	7

==== Draw 10 ====
Sheet B	1	2	3	4	5	6	7	8	9	10	11	Final
Newfoundland and Labrador (Godsland) 🔨	0	2	0	0	2	0	0	1	0	0	0	5
Northwest Territories (Walsh)	1	0	0	1	0	1	0	0	1	1	2	7

Sheet C	1	2	3	4	5	6	7	8	9	10	Final
Manitoba (Burtnyk) 🔨	0	0	0	2	0	4	0	0	1	0	7
Nova Scotia (Clarke)	1	1	0	0	2	0	0	3	0	1	8

Sheet G	1	2	3	4	5	6	7	8	9	10	11	Final
Saskatchewan (Jones) 🔨	0	0	0	1	1	1	0	0	0	1	0	4
Alberta (Streifel)	2	1	0	0	0	0	0	0	1	0	1	5

==== Tiebreaker ====
Sheet E	1	2	3	4	5	6	7	8	9	10	11	Final
Newfoundland and Labrador (Godsland) 🔨	2	0	0	2	0	0	4	0	0	0	0	8
Nova Scotia (Clarke)	0	2	0	0	2	1	0	0	2	1	1	9

=== Pool B ===
==== Draw 1 ====
Sheet A	1	2	3	4	5	6	7	8	9	10	Final
New Brunswick (Crook)	2	0	2	2	0	1	0	2	0	1	10
Yukon (Meger) 🔨	0	1	0	0	1	0	1	0	1	0	4

Sheet F	1	2	3	4	5	6	7	8	9	10	Final
British Columbia (Brown)	0	0	0	0	2	0	0	2	0	0	4
Northern Ontario (Burns) 🔨	0	0	0	1	0	0	1	0	0	1	3

==== Draw 2 ====
Sheet B	1	2	3	4	5	6	7	8	9	10	Final
Quebec (Boisvert) 🔨	2	0	1	0	0	1	1	3	0	X	8
Nunavut (Pinksen)	0	2	0	0	2	0	0	0	1	X	5

Sheet C	1	2	3	4	5	6	7	8	9	10	Final
Northern Ontario (Burns) 🔨	0	0	0	1	1	0	0	2	X	X	4
Ontario (Armstrong)	0	1	2	0	0	4	2	0	X	X	9

==== Draw 3 ====
Sheet H	1	2	3	4	5	6	7	8	9	10	Final
Yukon (Meger)	0	0	0	0	1	0	1	0	X	X	2
Quebec (Boisvert) 🔨	1	1	3	2	0	2	0	4	X	X	13

Sheet I	1	2	3	4	5	6	7	8	9	10	Final
Ontario (Armstrong)	0	0	0	1	0	0	0	2	0	1	4
British Columbia (Brown) 🔨	2	0	0	0	1	0	0	0	0	0	3

==== Draw 4 ====
Sheet B	1	2	3	4	5	6	7	8	9	10	Final
Northern Ontario (Burns)	0	3	0	5	0	4	2	1	X	X	15
Yukon (Meger) 🔨	2	0	1	0	1	0	0	0	X	X	4

Sheet G	1	2	3	4	5	6	7	8	9	10	Final
Nunavut (Pinksen) 🔨	0	1	0	0	0	0	1	0	X	X	2
New Brunswick (Crook)	0	0	2	2	5	1	0	3	X	X	13

==== Draw 5 ====
Sheet G	1	2	3	4	5	6	7	8	9	10	11	Final
British Columbia (Brown)	3	1	0	0	1	0	2	0	0	0	2	9
Quebec (Boisvert) 🔨	0	0	4	1	0	1	0	0	0	1	0	7

Sheet H	1	2	3	4	5	6	7	8	9	10	Final
Nunavut (Pinksen)	0	1	0	0	0	1	0	1	X	X	3
Ontario (Armstrong) 🔨	5	0	3	2	2	0	2	0	X	X	14

==== Draw 6 ====
Sheet B	1	2	3	4	5	6	7	8	9	10	Final
Ontario (Armstrong)	0	1	0	1	3	0	0	0	0	1	6
New Brunswick (Crook) 🔨	0	0	0	0	0	1	2	1	1	0	5

Sheet F	1	2	3	4	5	6	7	8	9	10	Final
Yukon (Meger)	0	1	0	0	0	0	1	2	0	X	4
Nunavut (Pinksen) 🔨	3	0	0	0	3	0	0	0	2	X	8

Sheet I	1	2	3	4	5	6	7	8	9	10	Final
Quebec (Boisvert)	0	2	0	2	0	1	0	1	2	1	9
Northern Ontario (Burns) 🔨	2	0	3	0	2	0	1	0	0	0	8

==== Draw 7 ====
Sheet A	1	2	3	4	5	6	7	8	9	10	Final
Quebec (Boisvert)	1	0	0	1	0	0	2	0	0	X	4
Ontario (Armstrong) 🔨	0	2	0	0	1	0	0	2	1	X	6

Sheet D	1	2	3	4	5	6	7	8	9	10	Final
Nunavut (Pinksen)	0	0	0	1	0	0	1	0	X	X	2
Northern Ontario (Burns) 🔨	2	1	0	0	2	1	0	1	X	X	7

Sheet E	1	2	3	4	5	6	7	8	9	10	Final
New Brunswick (Crook)	2	0	1	1	3	1	0	1	0	X	9
British Columbia (Brown) 🔨	0	4	0	0	0	0	1	0	1	X	6

==== Draw 8 ====
Sheet D	1	2	3	4	5	6	7	8	9	10	Final
Yukon (Meger) 🔨	0	1	0	0	0	1	0	0	X	X	2
British Columbia (Brown)	3	0	3	1	1	0	0	3	X	X	11

==== Draw 9 ====
Sheet C	1	2	3	4	5	6	7	8	9	10	Final
British Columbia (Brown) 🔨	1	4	0	4	0	4	0	1	X	X	14
Nunavut (Pinksen)	0	0	1	0	1	0	1	0	X	X	3

Sheet H	1	2	3	4	5	6	7	8	9	10	Final
Northern Ontario (Burns) 🔨	0	2	2	2	0	1	0	0	1	X	8
New Brunswick (Crook)	0	0	0	0	1	0	1	1	0	X	3

==== Draw 10 ====
Sheet D	1	2	3	4	5	6	7	8	9	10	Final
New Brunswick (Crook) 🔨	1	0	2	0	0	1	0	1	0	0	5
Quebec (Boisvert)	0	1	0	4	0	0	1	0	1	1	8

Sheet E	1	2	3	4	5	6	7	8	9	10	Final
Ontario (Armstrong) 🔨	0	0	1	2	2	0	0	3	0	1	9
Yukon (Meger)	3	2	0	0	0	0	1	0	0	0	6

==== Tiebreaker ====
Sheet A	1	2	3	4	5	6	7	8	9	10	Final
Northern Ontario (Burns) 🔨	2	0	0	1	1	0	3	0	1	X	8
New Brunswick (Crook)	0	0	0	0	0	3	0	2	0	X	5

== Placement Round ==
=== Seeding Pool ===
==== Standings ====
After Round-robin standings

Team	Skip	W	L
Newfoundland and Labrador	Brooke Godsland	6	3
Manitoba	Laura Burtnyk	5	4
New Brunswick	Samantha Crook	4	5
Northwest Territories	Zoey Walsh	2	7
Nunavut	Sadie Pinksen	1	8
Yukon	Alyssa Meger	1	8

==== Draw 12 ====
Sheet A	1	2	3	4	5	6	7	8	9	10	Final
Manitoba (Burtnyk)	2	0	3	1	0	0	0	0	1	1	8
New Brunswick (Crook) 🔨	0	2	0	0	1	0	1	1	0	0	5

==== Draw 13 ====
Sheet D	1	2	3	4	5	6	7	8	9	10	Final
Northwest Territories (Walsh)	1	0	1	0	0	1	0	0	X	X	3
New Brunswick (Crook) 🔨	0	2	0	4	0	0	2	1	X	X	9

Sheet G	1	2	3	4	5	6	7	8	9	10	Final
Newfoundland and Labrador (Godsland)	2	0	0	3	4	0	4	X	X	X	13
Yukon (Meger)	0	1	1	0	0	1	0	X	X	X	3

==== Draw 14 ====
Sheet F	1	2	3	4	5	6	7	8	9	10	Final
Northwest Territories (Walsh)	4	2	0	0	0	1	0	0	0	2	9
Nunavut (Pinksen) 🔨	0	0	4	1	0	0	1	1	1	0	8

==== Draw 15 ====
Sheet C	1	2	3	4	5	6	7	8	9	10	Final
Newfoundland and Labrador (Godsland) 🔨	0	0	2	2	0	4	1	1	X	X	10
Nunavut (Pinksen)	1	0	0	0	1	0	0	0	X	X	2

==== Draw 16 ====
Sheet B	1	2	3	4	5	6	7	8	9	10	Final
Newfoundland and Labrador (Godsland)	0	0	0	1	1	3	0	1	1	X	7
New Brunswick (Crook) 🔨	2	0	1	0	0	0	1	0	0	X	4

Sheet C	1	2	3	4	5	6	7	8	9	10	Final
Northwest Territories (Walsh) 🔨	2	0	1	0	5	0	0	0	0	1	9
Yukon (Meger)	0	1	0	2	0	3	2	1	1	0	10

Sheet I	1	2	3	4	5	6	7	8	9	10	Final
Manitoba (Burtnyk) 🔨	5	0	2	3	0	2	3	3	X	X	18
Nunavut (Pinksen)	0	1	0	0	1	0	0	0	X	X	2

=== Championship Pool ===
==== Championship Pool Standings ====
After Round-robin standings

Key
Teams to Playoffs

Province	Skip	W	L
Ontario	Hailey Armstrong	10	0
Northern Ontario	Krysta Burns	7	3
Alberta	Kristen Streifel	7	3
Quebec	Camille Boisvert	6	4
Saskatchewan	Kaitlyn Jones	5	5
British Columbia	Corryn Brown	5	5
Prince Edward Island	Lauren Lenentine	4	6
Nova Scotia	Kristin Clarke	4	6

==== Draw 12 ====
Sheet C	1	2	3	4	5	6	7	8	9	10	Final
Alberta (Streifel)	0	3	1	0	2	0	0	1	0	X	7
Quebec (Boisvert) 🔨	0	0	0	1	0	1	1	0	2	X	5

Sheet G	1	2	3	4	5	6	7	8	9	10	Final
British Columbia (Brown)	0	0	0	2	0	0	1	1	0	X	4
Prince Edward Island (Lenentine) 🔨	0	1	1	0	0	2	0	0	2	X	6

Sheet I	1	2	3	4	5	6	7	8	9	10	Final
Ontario (Armstrong) 🔨	1	0	1	0	1	0	0	0	1	1	5
Nova Scotia (Clarke)	0	1	0	1	0	1	0	0	0	0	3

==== Draw 13 ====
Sheet B	1	2	3	4	5	6	7	8	9	10	Final
Saskatchewan (Jones)	0	0	1	1	0	1	1	0	1	X	5
Northern Ontario (Burns) 🔨	0	3	0	0	3	0	0	2	0	X	8

==== Draw 14 ====
Sheet B	1	2	3	4	5	6	7	8	9	10	11	Final
Prince Edward Island (Lenentine) 🔨	1	0	1	0	0	0	1	0	0	1	0	4
Ontario (Armstrong)	0	1	0	2	0	0	0	0	1	0	1	5

Sheet H	1	2	3	4	5	6	7	8	9	10	11	Final
Quebec (Boisvert)	2	0	0	1	0	2	1	0	1	0	1	8
Saskatchewan (Jones) 🔨	0	3	0	0	1	0	0	2	0	1	0	7

Sheet I	1	2	3	4	5	6	7	8	9	10	Final
Northern Ontario (Burns)	0	0	2	1	3	0	1	0	2	X	9
Alberta (Streifel) 🔨	2	0	0	0	0	1	0	1	0	X	4

==== Draw 15 ====
Sheet D	1	2	3	4	5	6	7	8	9	10	Final
Nova Scotia (Clarke)	0	0	0	2	0	2	1	0	1	0	6
British Columbia (Brown) 🔨	0	1	1	0	1	0	0	2	0	2	7

Sheet E	1	2	3	4	5	6	7	8	9	10	Final
Prince Edward Island (Lenentine) 🔨	1	0	0	1	1	0	0	2	0	0	5
Quebec (Boisvert)	0	4	0	0	0	1	0	0	2	3	10

Sheet F	1	2	3	4	5	6	7	8	9	10	Final
Ontario (Armstrong) 🔨	0	0	0	1	0	3	0	1	1	X	6
Saskatchewan (Jones)	0	0	0	0	1	0	1	0	0	X	2

==== Draw 16 ====
Sheet A	1	2	3	4	5	6	7	8	9	10	Final
Nova Scotia (Clarke)	0	0	1	0	0	1	0	0	X	X	2
Northern Ontario (Burns) 🔨	1	1	0	3	1	0	0	0	X	X	6

Sheet F	1	2	3	4	5	6	7	8	9	10	Final
British Columbia (Brown)	0	1	0	0	1	0	0	2	0	2	6
Alberta (Streifel) 🔨	1	0	2	0	0	1	1	0	2	0	7

==== Draw 17 ====
Sheet C	1	2	3	4	5	6	7	8	9	10	Final
Saskatchewan (Jones) 🔨	0	1	1	1	1	0	1	0	2	X	7
British Columbia (Brown)	0	0	0	0	0	1	0	2	0	X	3

Sheet D	1	2	3	4	5	6	7	8	9	10	Final
Alberta (Streifel) 🔨	1	0	0	0	1	0	1	0	0	0	3
Ontario (Armstrong)	0	0	1	0	0	3	0	2	1	0	7

Sheet G	1	2	3	4	5	6	7	8	9	10	Final
Quebec (Boisvert) 🔨	0	0	1	0	1	0	2	0	0	X	4
Nova Scotia (Clarke)	2	2	0	3	0	1	0	1	2	X	11

Sheet H	1	2	3	4	5	6	7	8	9	10	Final
Northern Ontario (Burns)	1	0	2	0	1	0	0	1	0	1	6
Prince Edward Island (Lenentine) 🔨	0	1	0	1	0	1	0	0	1	0	4

== Playoffs ==
Semifinal			Final
			1	Ontario	3
2	Northern Ontario	3	3	Alberta	5
3	Alberta	7

=== Semifinal ===
Sheet C	1	2	3	4	5	6	7	8	9	10	Final
Northern Ontario (Burns) 🔨	0	0	1	0	0	0	0	2	0	X	3
Alberta (Striefel)	0	0	0	1	2	2	1	0	1	X	7

Player percentages
Northern Ontario		Alberta	
Laura Masters	91%	Brenna Bilassy	93%
Sara Guy	64%	Kate Goodhelpsen	78%
Megan Smith	68%	Chantele Broderson	88%
Krysta Burns	72%	Kristen Streifel	84%
Total	74%	Total	85%

=== Final ===
Sheet C	1	2	3	4	5	6	7	8	9	10	Final
Ontario (Armstrong) 🔨	0	0	2	0	0	0	0	1	0	0	3
Alberta (Streifel)	0	0	0	0	0	2	0	0	1	2	5

Player percentages
Ontario		Alberta	
Marcia Richardson	59%	Brenna Bilassy	94%
Lindsay Dubue	64%	Kate Goodhelpsen	80%
Grace Holyoke	76%	Chantele Broderson	80%
Hailey Armstrong	83%	Kristen Streifel	90%
Total	70%	Total	86%
