= Kelly Stearne =

Canadian curler

- Curler
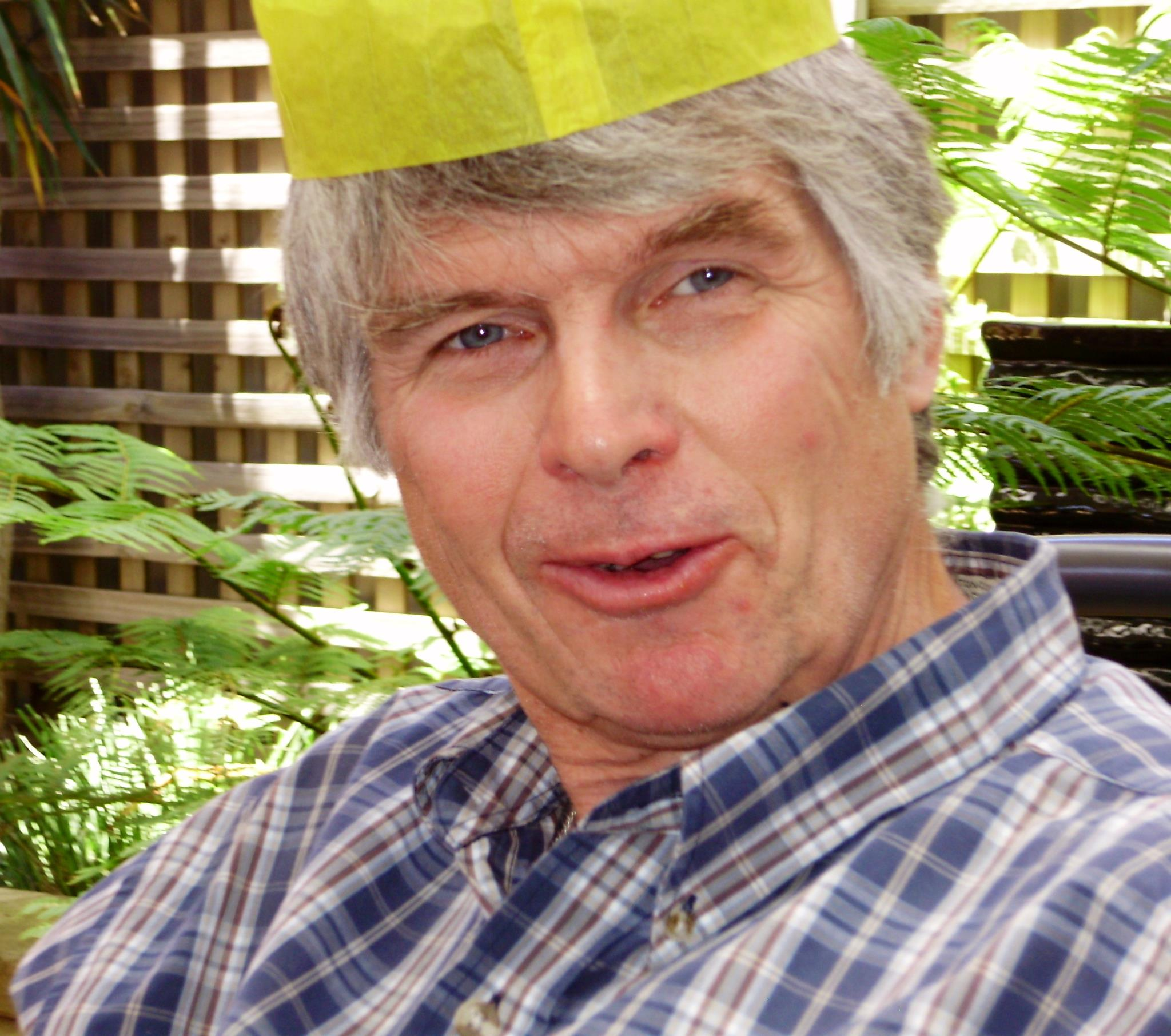
- Born: July 2, 1958; Calgary, Alberta, Canada
- Died: May 9, 2016 (aged 57); Adelaide, South Australia, Australia

Curling career
- Brier: 1 (1980)
Medal record
Men's curling
Representing Canada
World Junior Curling Championships
Gold medal – first place	1976 Aviemore
Gold medal – first place	1978 Grindelwald
Representing Alberta
Labatt Brier
Bronze medal – third place	1980 Calgary

John Timothy Kelly Stearne (July 2, 1958 – May 9, 2016) was a Canadian curler from Calgary. He played lead for the infamous Paul Gowsell rink which won two World Junior Curling Championships.

As a member of the Gowsell rink, Stearne won Canadian Junior Curling Championships for Alberta in 1976 and 1978. This qualified the team to represent Canada at the 1976 and 1978 World Junior Championships, respectively. In both events, the team captured gold.

After graduating from juniors, the team went on to win the Alberta Men's Championship in 1980 and represented Alberta at the 1980 Labatt Brier in their hometown of Calgary. The team finished in third place and never returned to the Brier.

Stearne moved to Adelaide, Australia, in 2005. He died there at age 57 after suffering a fall on May 9, 2016. He reunited with the rest of the Gowsell rink for one last bonspiel in November 2015.
