= Jim Wilson (curler) =

Canadian male curler

- Curler ♂

Team
- Curling club: Nutana CC, Saskatoon, SK

Curling career
- Member Association: Saskatchewan
- Brier: 2: (1979, 1980)
- World Championship: 1 (1980)
Medal record
Curling
Representing Canada
World Championships
Gold medal – first place	1980 Moncton
Representing Saskatchewan
Labatt Brier
Gold medal – first place	1980 Calgary
Silver medal – second place	1979 Ottawa

James R. Wilson is a Canadian curler from Shellbrook, Saskatchewan. He is a 1980 World Men's champion and a 1980 Brier champion.

== Awards ==
- Canadian Curling Hall of Fame: 1985 (with all 1980 World champions team skipped by Rick Folk)
- Saskatchewan Sports Hall of Fame: 1980 (1980 Rick Folk Curling Team)

== Teams ==
Season	Skip	Third	Second	Lead	Events
1972–73	Jim Wilson	Cam Hutchison	Rodger Schmidt	Norm Gilbertson	CJCC 1973 (?th)
1978–79	Rick Folk	Bob Thompson	Tom Wilson	Jim Wilson	Brier 1979 (silver)
1979–80	Rick Folk	Ron Mills	Tom Wilson	Jim Wilson	Brier 1980 (gold); WCC 1980 (gold)
2000–01	Mark Lane	Dave Folk	Jim Wilson	Brad Gee	
2004–05	Eugene Hritzuk	Larry Ruf	Jim Wilson	Dave Folk	CSCC 2005 (silver)
2005–06	Eugene Hritzuk	Larry Ruf	Jim Wilson	Dave Folk	CSCC 2006 (bronze)
2013–14	Eugene Hritzuk	Jim Wilson	Verne Anderson	Dave Folk	CMCC 2014 (gold)
2015–16	Eugene Hritzuk	Jim Wilson	Verne Anderson	Dave Folk	CMCC 2016 (bronze)
2016–17	Jim Wilson	Colin Coben	Dale Kohlenberg	Daryl Eddingfield	CMCC 2017 (bronze)

== Personal life ==
His brother Tom is a curler too and Jim's teammate.
