= 1980 Labatt Brier =

- Host city: Calgary, Alberta
- Arena: Stampede Corral
- Dates: March 2–9
- Attendance: 93,185
- Winner: Saskatchewan
- Curling club: Nutana CC, Saskatoon
- Skip: Rick Folk
- Third: Ron Mills
- Second: Tom Wilson
- Lead: Jim Wilson
- Finalist: Northern Ontario (Al Hackner)

The 1980 Labatt Brier, the Canadian men's curling championship was held from March 2 to 9, 1980 at the Stampede Corral in Calgary, Alberta. For the third consecutive year, the Brier set a then-record as the total attendance for the week was 93,185. This was the first Brier to be sponsored by the Labatt Brewing Company replacing the Macdonald Tobacco Company, who sponsored the Brier since the inaugural event in 1927 as the primary sponsor.

With a new sponsor came several changes to the Brier to make it more fan friendly such as a ban on smoking, a baseball-type scoreboard replacing the curling club-style scoreboard, and official umpires. The two biggest changes however were a three-team playoff after round robin play would determine the Brier champion with the top team in round robin play receiving a direct bye into the final and a new, shiny Labatt Tankard trophy replaced the old Macdonald Tankard trophy.

Team Saskatchewan, who was skipped by Rick Folk captured the Brier tankard after they defeated Northern Ontario in the final 10–6. It was the last time a team using corn brooms won the Brier.

Northern Ontario advanced to the final after they defeated Alberta in the semifinal 6–5.

This was the seventh and as of 2024, most recent Brier championship for Saskatchewan and the first of two won by Folk, with his other coming in 1994 with British Columbia. The Folk rink would go onto represent Canada in the 1980 Air Canada Silver Broom, the men's world curling championship on home soil in Moncton, New Brunswick where they won Canada's first world championship since 1972.

== Teams ==
The teams were listed as follows:

Alberta	British Columbia	Manitoba
Calgary WC, Calgary Skip: Paul Gowsell; Third: Neil Houston; Second: Glen Jackson; Lead: Kelly Stearne	Victoria CC, Victoria Skip: Tim Horrigan; Third: Lowell Goulden; Second: Kelly Horrigan; Lead: David Smith	CFB Winnipeg CC, Winnipeg Skip: Earle Morris; Third: Clare DeBlonde; Second: Garry DeBlonde; Lead: Winston Warren
New Brunswick	Newfoundland	Northern Ontario
Thistle St. Andrews CC, Saint John Skip: Richard Belyea; Third: Don Pennell; Second: Wade Blanchard; Lead: Brian McLeod	St. John's CC, St. John's Skip: Wayne Hamilton; Third: Lew Andrews; Second: Paul Hamilton; Lead: Colin James	Fort William CC, Thunder Bay Skip: Al Hackner; Third: Rick Lang; Second: Bob Nicol; Lead: Bruce Kennedy
Nova Scotia	Ontario	Prince Edward Island
Dartmouth CC, Dartmouth Skip: Peter Hope; Third: Peter MacPhee; Second: Gary Clarke; Lead: Donald MacLeod	Penetang CC, Penetanguishene Skip: Russ Howard; Third: Larry Merkley; Second: Robert Rushton; Lead: Kent Carstairs	Crapaud Community CC, Crapaud Skip: Ted MacFadyen; Third: Bill MacFadyen; Second: Mike Coady; Lead: Gord Hermann
Quebec	Saskatchewan	Northwest Territories/Yukon
St. Laurent CC, Mount Royal Skip: Jim Ursel; Third: Don Aitken; Second: Lawren Steventon; Lead: Malcolm Turner	Nutana CC, Saskatoon Skip: Rick Folk; Third: Ron Mills; Second: Tom Wilson; Lead: Jim Wilson	Yellowknife CC, Yellowknife Skip: Al Delmage; Third: Bill Strain; Second: Roy Giles; Lead: Ron Kapicki

== Map of teams ==
Provincial Winners

== Round robin standings ==
Final Round Robin standings

Key
Teams to Playoffs

Province	Skip	W	L	PF	PA	EW	EL	BE	SE	S%
Saskatchewan	Rick Folk	9	2	69	50	46	38	6	14	78%
Northern Ontario	Al Hackner	8	3	90	67	54	45	4	20	72%
Alberta	Paul Gowsell	8	3	66	54	43	41	8	11	75%
Quebec	Jim Ursel	7	4	72	63	46	43	5	14	73%
Manitoba	Earle Morris	6	5	74	72	47	47	4	15	71%
Northwest Territories/Yukon	Al Delmage	5	6	63	66	42	43	8	14	70%
Ontario	Russ Howard	5	6	65	68	44	43	11	12	70%
British Columbia	Tim Horrigan	5	6	65	70	45	46	7	12	71%
Prince Edward Island	Ted MacFadyen	4	7	57	73	45	47	10	12	67%
New Brunswick	Richard Belyea	3	8	55	65	39	48	10	7	67%
Newfoundland	Wayne Hamilton	3	8	62	75	40	52	14	8	72%
Nova Scotia	Peter Hope	3	8	66	81	47	45	4	11	69%

== Round robin results ==
All draw times are listed in Mountain Standard Time (UTC-07:00).

=== Draw 1 ===
Sunday, March 2, 2:00 pm

Sheet A	1	2	3	4	5	6	7	8	9	10	Final
Prince Edward Island (MacFadyen)	0	1	1	0	0	1	0	1	0	3	7
New Brunswick (Belyea) 🔨	1	0	0	3	0	0	1	0	1	0	6

Sheet B	1	2	3	4	5	6	7	8	9	10	Final
British Columbia (Horrigan) 🔨	0	0	0	2	0	0	0	0	1	X	3
Alberta (Gowsell)	0	1	2	0	0	0	0	2	0	X	5

Sheet C	1	2	3	4	5	6	7	8	9	10	Final
Saskatchewan (Folk)	0	1	0	0	0	1	0	3	0	X	5
Newfoundland (Hamilton) 🔨	0	0	0	1	0	0	1	0	0	X	2

Sheet D	1	2	3	4	5	6	7	8	9	10	Final
Northwest Territories/Yukon (Delmage) 🔨	1	1	2	0	1	0	0	0	0	X	5
Manitoba (Morris)	0	0	0	1	0	1	3	0	2	X	7

Sheet E	1	2	3	4	5	6	7	8	9	10	11	Final
Nova Scotia (Hope) 🔨	1	0	1	0	2	2	0	3	0	0	0	9
Northern Ontario (Hackner)	0	1	0	1	0	0	2	0	4	1	1	10

=== Draw 2 ===
Sunday, March 2, 7:30 pm

Sheet A	1	2	3	4	5	6	7	8	9	10	Final
Nova Scotia (Hope)	1	0	0	2	1	1	0	0	2	3	10
Manitoba (Morris) 🔨	0	0	4	0	0	0	0	2	0	0	6

Sheet B	1	2	3	4	5	6	7	8	9	10	Final
Newfoundland (Hamilton) 🔨	2	2	0	0	0	0	0	0	0	X	4
Northwest Territories/Yukon (Delmage)	0	0	1	1	1	0	0	1	3	X	7

Sheet C	1	2	3	4	5	6	7	8	9	10	Final
New Brunswick (Belyea)	0	0	0	0	1	2	0	1	0	X	4
Northern Ontario (Hackner) 🔨	1	0	2	3	0	0	2	0	1	X	9

Sheet D	1	2	3	4	5	6	7	8	9	10	Final
Prince Edward Island (MacFadyen)	1	0	1	0	1	0	0	0	0	X	3
Saskatchewan (Folk) 🔨	0	1	0	2	0	2	0	2	0	X	7

Sheet E	1	2	3	4	5	6	7	8	9	10	11	Final
Ontario (Howard) 🔨	0	0	0	2	0	2	0	0	2	1	2	9
Quebec (Ursel)	1	0	0	0	1	0	2	3	0	0	0	7

=== Draw 3 ===
Monday, March 3, 9:00 am

Sheet C	1	2	3	4	5	6	7	8	9	10	11	Final
Newfoundland (Hamilton) 🔨	0	2	0	2	0	0	2	1	0	0	1	8
Prince Edward Island (MacFadyen)	0	0	2	0	2	1	0	0	1	1	0	7

Sheet D	1	2	3	4	5	6	7	8	9	10	Final
Saskatchewan (Folk)	0	2	0	0	0	0	1	0	2	X	5
New Brunswick (Belyea) 🔨	2	0	0	2	1	1	0	2	0	X	8

=== Draw 4 ===
Monday, March 3, 1:30 pm

Sheet A	1	2	3	4	5	6	7	8	9	10	Final
Saskatchewan (Folk) 🔨	0	2	0	1	0	1	0	0	2	X	6
Northwest Territories/Yukon (Delmage)	0	0	1	0	1	0	1	0	0	X	3

Sheet B	1	2	3	4	5	6	7	8	9	10	Final
Northern Ontario (Hackner)	0	0	2	0	0	1	0	2	0	2	7
Ontario (Howard) 🔨	0	1	0	1	2	0	1	0	0	0	5

Sheet C	1	2	3	4	5	6	7	8	9	10	Final
Manitoba (Morris)	0	2	1	1	0	0	0	1	0	X	5
Alberta (Gowsell) 🔨	2	0	0	0	0	1	3	0	1	X	7

Sheet D	1	2	3	4	5	6	7	8	9	10	Final
Nova Scotia (Hope) 🔨	2	0	2	0	1	0	0	2	0	0	7
Quebec (Ursel)	0	3	0	1	0	2	0	0	3	1	10

Sheet E	1	2	3	4	5	6	7	8	9	10	Final
Newfoundland (Hamilton)	0	1	0	0	2	0	1	1	1	X	6
British Columbia (Horrigan) 🔨	3	0	3	2	0	1	0	0	0	X	9

=== Draw 5 ===
Monday, March 3, 7:30 pm

Sheet A	1	2	3	4	5	6	7	8	9	10	Final
Alberta (Gowsell) 🔨	1	0	1	0	1	0	0	2	0	X	5
Northern Ontario (Hackner)	0	3	0	2	0	1	2	0	2	X	10

Sheet B	1	2	3	4	5	6	7	8	9	10	11	Final
Quebec (Ursel) 🔨	1	0	1	0	0	2	0	1	0	0	1	6
Manitoba (Morris)	0	0	0	0	2	0	1	0	1	1	0	5

Sheet C	1	2	3	4	5	6	7	8	9	10	Final
Ontario (Howard) 🔨	3	0	0	0	1	1	0	1	0	2	8
Nova Scotia (Hope)	0	1	0	1	0	0	2	0	1	0	5

Sheet D	1	2	3	4	5	6	7	8	9	10	Final
New Brunswick (Belyea)	0	0	1	0	1	0	1	0	2	X	5
British Columbia (Horrigan) 🔨	2	2	0	1	0	1	0	1	0	X	7

Sheet E	1	2	3	4	5	6	7	8	9	10	Final
Northwest Territories/Yukon (Delmage)	0	0	2	0	0	3	1	0	0	1	7
Prince Edward Island (MacFadyen) 🔨	1	1	0	0	3	0	0	0	1	0	6

=== Draw 6 ===
Tuesday, March 4, 9:00 am

Sheet B	1	2	3	4	5	6	7	8	9	10	Final
Northwest Territories/Yukon (Delmage)	1	0	4	4	0	2	0	0	X	X	11
Nova Scotia (Hope) 🔨	0	1	0	0	1	0	2	1	X	X	5

Sheet C	1	2	3	4	5	6	7	8	9	10	Final
Northern Ontario (Hackner) 🔨	2	0	2	3	0	3	1	0	X	X	11
Manitoba (Morris)	0	1	0	0	1	0	0	1	X	X	3

=== Draw 7 ===
Tuesday, March 4, 1:30 pm

Sheet A	1	2	3	4	5	6	7	8	9	10	Final
Newfoundland (Hamilton) 🔨	1	0	0	0	1	0	1	0	0	X	3
Quebec (Ursel)	0	1	2	0	0	2	0	1	0	X	6

Sheet B	1	2	3	4	5	6	7	8	9	10	Final
Saskatchewan (Folk)	0	0	0	2	1	0	0	1	1	1	6
Northern Ontario (Hackner) 🔨	1	1	1	0	0	0	2	0	0	0	5

Sheet C	1	2	3	4	5	6	7	8	9	10	Final
British Columbia (Horrigan)	0	0	0	1	0	2	0	0	1	0	4
Northwest Territories/Yukon (Delmage) 🔨	0	1	1	0	1	0	0	1	0	2	6

Sheet D	1	2	3	4	5	6	7	8	9	10	Final
Ontario (Howard)	1	0	0	0	0	2	2	1	0	X	6
Prince Edward Island (MacFadyen) 🔨	0	2	0	0	0	0	0	0	1	X	3

Sheet E	1	2	3	4	5	6	7	8	9	10	Final
Alberta (Gowsell)	1	0	0	0	2	0	2	1	0	X	6
New Brunswick (Belyea) 🔨	0	2	0	0	0	0	0	0	1	X	3

=== Draw 8 ===
Tuesday, March 4, 7:30 pm

Sheet A	1	2	3	4	5	6	7	8	9	10	Final
British Columbia (Horrigan) 🔨	1	0	2	0	0	0	1	0	0	X	4
Ontario (Howard)	0	1	0	3	1	1	0	1	0	X	7

Sheet B	1	2	3	4	5	6	7	8	9	10	Final
New Brunswick (Belyea) 🔨	0	0	1	0	0	2	0	0	1	0	4
Quebec (Ursel)	1	0	0	0	1	0	1	1	0	1	5

Sheet C	1	2	3	4	5	6	7	8	9	10	Final
Alberta (Gowsell) 🔨	0	0	2	1	0	1	0	3	0	X	7
Prince Edward Island (MacFadyen)	0	1	0	0	1	0	1	0	1	X	4

Sheet D	1	2	3	4	5	6	7	8	9	10	Final
Nova Scotia (Hope) 🔨	1	0	1	0	1	0	0	2	0	2	7
Newfoundland (Hamilton)	0	2	0	3	0	0	1	0	0	0	6

Sheet E	1	2	3	4	5	6	7	8	9	10	Final
Saskatchewan (Folk) 🔨	0	3	1	1	0	0	1	0	1	X	7
Manitoba (Morris)	1	0	0	0	2	1	0	1	0	X	5

=== Draw 9 ===
Wednesday, March 5, 9:00 am

Sheet C	1	2	3	4	5	6	7	8	9	10	Final
British Columbia (Horrigan) 🔨	1	0	1	0	1	0	0	1	1	0	5
Quebec (Ursel)	0	1	0	1	0	2	0	0	0	3	7

Sheet D	1	2	3	4	5	6	7	8	9	10	Final
Alberta (Gowsell) 🔨	0	2	0	1	0	1	0	2	1	X	7
Ontario (Howard)	1	0	1	0	1	0	1	0	0	X	4

=== Draw 10 ===
Wednesday, March 5, 1:30 pm

Sheet A	1	2	3	4	5	6	7	8	9	10	Final
New Brunswick (Belyea) 🔨	0	0	1	0	0	0	3	0	2	X	6
Nova Scotia (Hope)	0	0	0	1	1	0	0	1	0	X	3

Sheet B	1	2	3	4	5	6	7	8	9	10	Final
Manitoba (Morris) 🔨	2	0	2	1	0	3	3	0	X	X	11
Prince Edward Island (MacFadyen)	0	1	0	0	1	0	0	1	X	X	3

Sheet C	1	2	3	4	5	6	7	8	9	10	Final
Northwest Territories/Yukon (Delmage) 🔨	0	1	1	0	0	2	2	1	X	X	7
Ontario (Howard)	0	0	0	2	0	0	0	0	X	X	2

Sheet D	1	2	3	4	5	6	7	8	9	10	Final
Saskatchewan (Folk) 🔨	0	0	2	1	0	0	0	1	1	1	6
Quebec (Ursel)	0	3	0	0	1	0	0	0	0	0	4

Sheet E	1	2	3	4	5	6	7	8	9	10	11	Final
Northern Ontario (Hackner) 🔨	1	0	0	1	1	0	1	0	2	1	1	8
Newfoundland (Hamilton)	0	2	0	0	0	2	0	2	0	0	0	6

=== Draw 11 ===
Wednesday, March 5, 7:30 pm

Sheet A	1	2	3	4	5	6	7	8	9	10	Final
Manitoba (Morris) 🔨	1	1	3	0	1	0	1	0	1	1	9
Newfoundland (Hamilton)	0	0	0	3	0	2	0	2	0	0	7

Sheet B	1	2	3	4	5	6	7	8	9	10	Final
Alberta (Gowsell) 🔨	2	0	2	0	1	1	0	2	0	X	8
Saskatchewan (Folk)	0	1	0	1	0	0	2	0	0	X	4

Sheet C	1	2	3	4	5	6	7	8	9	10	Final
Prince Edward Island (MacFadyen) 🔨	1	1	0	1	0	2	0	1	1	3	10
Northern Ontario (Hackner)	0	0	2	0	2	0	2	0	0	0	6

Sheet D	1	2	3	4	5	6	7	8	9	10	Final
British Columbia (Horrigan) 🔨	0	0	2	1	0	4	0	1	0	1	9
Nova Scotia (Hope)	0	1	0	0	2	0	1	0	3	0	7

Sheet E	1	2	3	4	5	6	7	8	9	10	Final
New Brunswick (Belyea) 🔨	1	0	1	0	2	0	0	1	1	X	6
Northwest Territories/Yukon (Delmage)	0	0	0	1	0	0	1	0	0	X	2

=== Draw 12 ===
Thursday, March 6, 1:30 pm

Sheet A	1	2	3	4	5	6	7	8	9	10	11	Final
Northwest Territories/Yukon (Delmage) 🔨	0	1	0	1	0	1	0	0	1	1	0	5
Alberta (Gowsell)	0	0	2	0	1	0	0	2	0	0	1	6

Sheet B	1	2	3	4	5	6	7	8	9	10	Final
Ontario (Howard) 🔨	1	1	0	1	0	1	0	0	4	X	8
New Brunswick (Belyea)	0	0	0	0	2	0	0	1	0	X	3

Sheet C	1	2	3	4	5	6	7	8	9	10	Final
Manitoba (Morris) 🔨	0	2	0	2	0	2	0	0	3	X	9
British Columbia (Horrigan)	1	0	1	0	1	0	1	2	0	X	6

Sheet D	1	2	3	4	5	6	7	8	9	10	Final
Quebec (Ursel) 🔨	0	0	0	3	0	0	0	1	0	X	4
Northern Ontario (Hackner)	3	0	1	0	0	0	1	0	3	X	8

Sheet E	1	2	3	4	5	6	7	8	9	10	11	Final
Prince Edward Island (MacFadyen) 🔨	0	0	0	0	0	0	1	0	1	1	1	4
Nova Scotia (Hope)	0	1	0	1	0	0	0	1	0	0	0	3

=== Draw 13 ===
Thursday, March 6, 7:30 pm

Sheet A	1	2	3	4	5	6	7	8	9	10	11	Final
Northern Ontario (Hackner) 🔨	0	1	0	0	2	0	1	0	2	1	0	7
British Columbia (Horrigan)	1	0	3	2	0	0	0	1	0	0	2	9

Sheet B	1	2	3	4	5	6	7	8	9	10	Final
Nova Scotia (Hope) 🔨	2	0	1	0	1	0	0	1	0	X	5
Saskatchewan (Folk)	0	1	0	2	0	1	1	0	2	X	7

Sheet C	1	2	3	4	5	6	7	8	9	10	Final
Quebec (Ursel) 🔨	1	1	0	3	0	3	2	1	X	X	11
Northwest Territories/Yukon (Delmage)	0	0	2	0	3	0	0	0	X	X	5

Sheet D	1	2	3	4	5	6	7	8	9	10	11	Final
Newfoundland (Hamilton) 🔨	0	0	0	0	1	0	2	0	0	1	0	4
Alberta (Gowsell)	0	1	0	0	0	1	0	2	0	0	2	6

Sheet E	1	2	3	4	5	6	7	8	9	10	Final
Manitoba (Morris) 🔨	0	0	1	2	0	2	0	0	0	1	6
Ontario (Howard)	0	1	0	0	1	0	0	0	2	0	4

=== Draw 14 ===
Friday, March 7, 9:00 am

Sheet A	1	2	3	4	5	6	7	8	9	10	11	Final
Quebec (Ursel) 🔨	0	1	1	0	0	0	1	1	1	0	0	5
Prince Edward Island (MacFadyen)	1	0	0	0	1	1	0	0	0	2	1	6

Sheet B	1	2	3	4	5	6	7	8	9	10	Final
Ontario (Howard) 🔨	3	0	2	0	1	0	0	1	0	X	7
Newfoundland (Hamilton)	0	2	0	2	0	2	1	0	3	X	10

Sheet C	1	2	3	4	5	6	7	8	9	10	Final
Nova Scotia (Hope) 🔨	0	1	0	0	1	0	1	0	1	1	5
Alberta (Gowsell)	0	0	0	1	0	1	0	2	0	0	4

Sheet D	1	2	3	4	5	6	7	8	9	10	Final
Manitoba (Morris) 🔨	0	2	1	0	1	2	0	1	0	1	8
New Brunswick (Belyea)	1	0	0	3	0	0	1	0	1	0	6

Sheet E	1	2	3	4	5	6	7	8	9	10	Final
British Columbia (Horrigan) 🔨	0	0	0	0	1	1	0	0	0	X	2
Saskatchewan (Folk)	2	0	0	0	0	0	3	1	1	X	7

=== Draw 15 ===
Friday, March 7, 1:30 pm

Sheet A	1	2	3	4	5	6	7	8	9	10	Final
Ontario (Howard) 🔨	0	0	1	0	2	0	1	0	1	X	5
Saskatchewan (Folk)	2	2	0	3	0	1	0	1	0	X	9

Sheet B	1	2	3	4	5	6	7	8	9	10	Final
Prince Edward Island (MacFadyen) 🔨	0	1	0	0	0	2	0	1	0	X	4
British Columbia (Horrigan)	1	0	1	1	2	0	1	0	1	X	7

Sheet C	1	2	3	4	5	6	7	8	9	10	Final
Newfoundland (Hamilton) 🔨	1	0	1	0	0	1	0	0	1	1	5
New Brunswick (Belyea)	0	0	0	1	1	0	1	1	0	0	4

Sheet D	1	2	3	4	5	6	7	8	9	10	Final
Northern Ontario (Hackner) 🔨	0	0	1	0	2	1	2	1	0	2	9
Northwest Territories/Yukon (Delmage)	1	0	0	1	0	0	0	0	3	0	5

Sheet E	1	2	3	4	5	6	7	8	9	10	Final
Quebec (Ursel) 🔨	0	0	3	0	1	0	0	1	2	X	7
Alberta (Gowsell)	0	1	0	2	0	2	0	0	0	X	5

== Playoffs ==
Semifinal			Final
			1	Saskatchewan	10
2	Northern Ontario	6	2	Northern Ontario	6
3	Alberta	5

=== Semifinal ===
Saturday, March 8, 12:30 pm

Sheet C	1	2	3	4	5	6	7	8	9	10	Final
Northern Ontario (Hackner)	0	0	1	0	2	0	0	1	0	2	6
Alberta (Gowsell) 🔨	1	0	0	2	0	0	1	0	1	0	5

Player percentages
Northern Ontario		Alberta	
Bruce Kennedy	73%	Kelly Stearne	71%
Bob Nicol	74%	Glen Jackson	84%
Rick Lang	76%	Neil Houston	80%
Al Hackner	86%	Paul Gowsell	76%
Total	77%	Total	78%

=== Final ===
Sunday, March 9, 12:00 pm

Sheet C	1	2	3	4	5	6	7	8	9	10	Final
Northern Ontario (Hackner)	0	0	2	0	1	1	0	2	0	X	6
Saskatchewan (Folk) 🔨	3	3	0	0	0	0	1	0	3	X	10

Player percentages
Northern Ontario		Saskatchewan	
Bruce Kennedy	68%	Jim Wilson	67%
Bob Nicol	84%	Tom Wilson	78%
Rick Lang	76%	Ron Mills	79%
Al Hackner	65%	Rick Folk	74%
Total	73%	Total	74%

== Statistics ==
=== Top 5 player percentages ===
Final Round Robin Percentages

Key
All-Star Team

Leads	%
(Saskatchewan) Jim Wilson	83
(Alberta) Kelly Stearne	76
(Northwest Territories) Ron Kapicki	75
(Manitoba) Winston Warren	75
(British Columbia) David Smith	74
(Newfoundland and Labrador) Colin James	74

Seconds	%
(Saskatchewan) Tom Wilson	81
(Alberta) Glen Jackson	76
(Newfoundland and Labrador) Paul Hamilton	75
(Quebec) Lawren Steventon	75
(Northwest Territories) Roy Giles	75

Thirds	%
(Alberta) Neil Houston	76
(Saskatchewan) Ron Mills	76
(British Columbia) Lowell Goulden	74
(Northern Ontario) Rick Lang	71
(Quebec) Don Aitken	71

Skips	%
(Saskatchewan) Rick Folk	74
(Alberta) Paul Gowsell	74
(Quebec) Jim Ursel	72
(Northern Ontario) Al Hackner	71
(Ontario) Russ Howard	71

== Awards ==
=== All-Star Team ===
The media selected the following curlers as All-Stars.

Position	Name	Team
Skip	Rick Folk (2)	Saskatchewan
Third	Neil Houston	Alberta
Second	Tom Wilson	Saskatchewan
Lead	Jim Wilson	Saskatchewan

=== Ross G.L. Harstone Award ===
The Ross Harstone Award was presented to the player chosen by their fellow peers as the curler who best represented Harstone's high ideals of good sportsmanship, observance of the rules, exemplary conduct and curling ability.

Name	Team	Position
Wayne Hamilton	Newfoundland	Skip
