= Earle Morris (curler) =

Canadian curler

- Curler
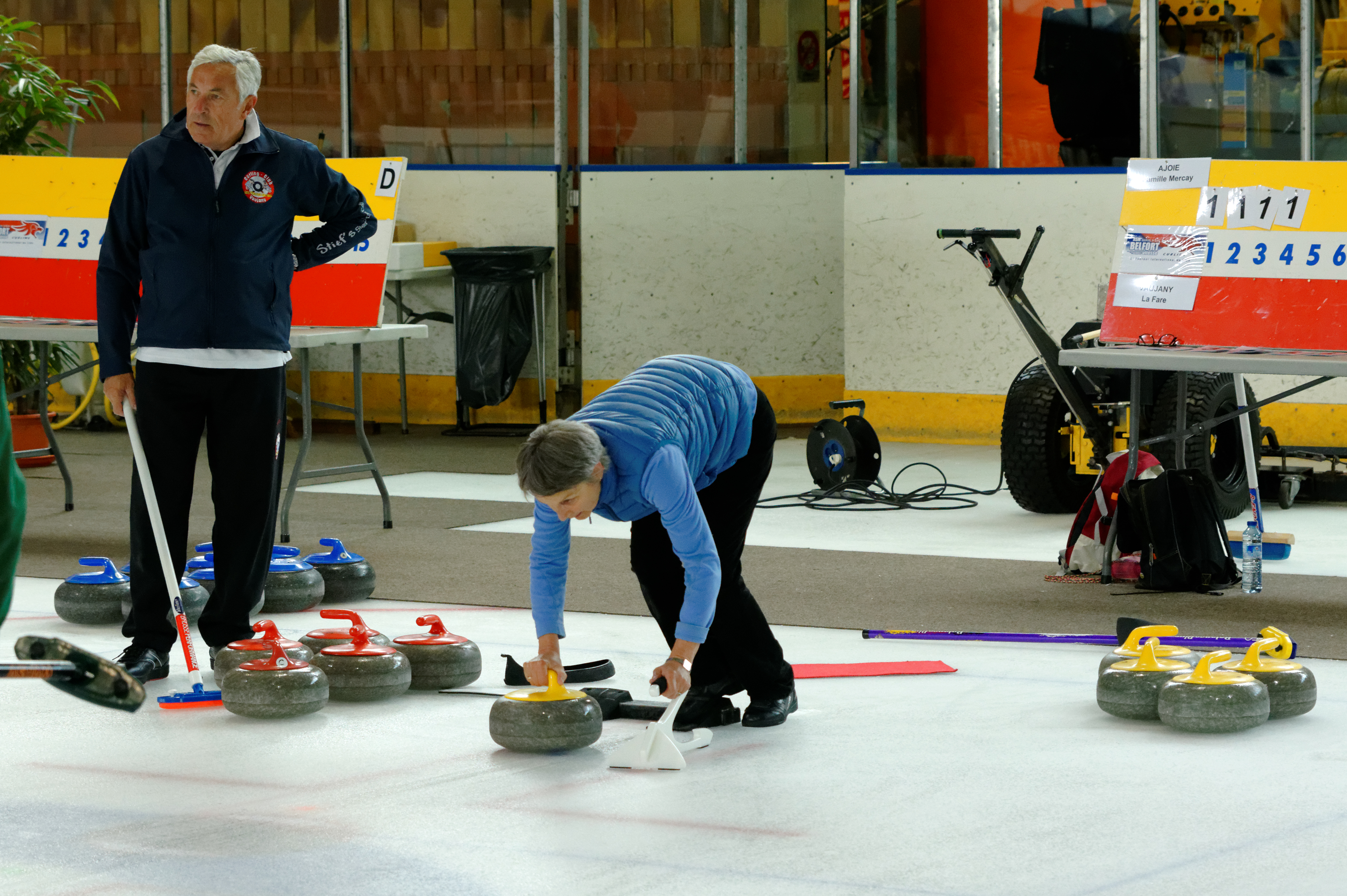
- Born: August 16, 1945 (age 81); Rosthern, Saskatchewan

Curling career
- Member Association: Manitoba (1979-1980); Quebec (1981-1982); Ontario (1984-2004)
- Brier: 3 (1980, 1982, 1985)

Earle H. C. Morris (born August 16, 1945) is a Canadian curler from Ottawa, Ontario. He is the first curler to have played for three different provinces at the Brier (since then, the feat has been duplicated by Ryan Fry and Morris' son John). He is the inventor of the "Stabilizer" curling delivery aid. He was named to the Canadian Curling Hall of Fame in 2016. He is currently the coach of the Elena Stern rink.

== Career ==
Morris grew up in the Canadian province of Saskatchewan. He was a great athlete growing up, excelling in both baseball and in curling.

Working with the military, Morris moved around a lot, giving him the opportunity to curl out of many places. He made it to his first Brier in 1980, curling out of the CFB Winnipeg Curling Club and representing Manitoba. At the Brier, he skipped his rink of Clare DeBlonde, Garry DeBlonde and Winston Warren to a 6–5 record. Two years later, he made the 1982 Labatt Brier playing as the third for the Don Aitken rink from the CFB St-Jean Curling Club in Quebec. Quebec finished with a 5–6 record, out of the playoffs. Finally, in 1985, Morris played in his third and final Brier. This time, he skipped the Ontario team of Lovel Lord, Dave Merklinger and Bill Fletcher out of the R.C.N. (Navy) Curling Club in Ottawa. His record was once again 5–6.

=== Coaching career ===
Morris stayed in Ottawa and went on to become a coach. He coached two Canadian junior championship teams (his son's in 1998 (co-coach with Brian Savill) and Rachel Homan's in 2010). He is the former coach of the Jennifer Jones rink (2012) and the Australian national team (2006–2008). Most recently, he coached Rachel Homan and her rink out of Ontario to a national championship and a bronze medal at the world championships as well as a repeat national title and world silver medal in 2014.

In the 2015–16 curling season Morris is a coach of men's Team Canada rink (skipped by Pat Simmons with Morris' son John at third) for the 2016 Tim Hortons Brier and other competitions.

He was inducted into the Canadian Curling Hall of Fame on March 9, 2016, during Brier week in Ottawa. He was inducted into the Ottawa Sports Hall of Fame in 2023.

== Personal life ==
Morris is the grandson of Saskatchewan's 1933 provincial champion skip Cliff McLaughlin, making three generations of his family to compete in the Brier. He graduated from the Royal Military College of Canada in 1967. He is married to Maureen, and they have three children. His son John is an Olympic and world champion curler based in Calgary, Alberta.
