= Henri Müller =

French male curler

- Curler ♂

Team
- Curling club: Bischeim CC, Strassbourg

Curling career
- Member Association: France
- World Championship: 1 (1980)
- European Championship: 2 (1982, 1983)
Medal record
Curling
French Men's Championship
Gold medal – first place	1980

Henri Müller is a French curler.

At the national level, he is a 1980 French men's champion curler.

== Teams ==
Season	Skip	Third	Second	Lead	Events
1979–80	René Robert (fourth)	Jean-Marc Causeret	Claude Groff	Henri Müller (skip)	WCC 1980 (10th)
1982–83	Henri Müller	René Robert	Fernand Schillinger	Albert Lecomte	ECC 1982 (8th)
1983–84	Henri Müller	René Robert	Fernand Schillinger	Claude Groff	ECC 1983 (8th)
