= 2014 Canadian Masters Curling Championships =

- Host city: Coaldale, Alberta
- Arena: Coaldale Granite Curling Club
- Dates: March 31–April 6
- Men's winner: Saskatchewan
- Curling club: Nutana CC, Saskatoon
- Skip: Eugene Hritzuk
- Third: Jim Wilson
- Second: Verne Anderson
- Lead: Dave Folk
- Finalist: Alberta (Les Rogers)
- Women's winner: Saskatchewan
- Skip: Merle Kopach
- Third: Audrey Crossan
- Second: Linda Delver
- Lead: Janet Rooks
- Finalist: Ontario (Diana Favel)

The 2014 Canadian Masters Curling Championships were held from March 31 to April 6 at the Coaldale Granite Curling Club in Coaldale, Alberta.
