= Ron Mills (curler) =

Canadian male curler

- Curler ♂
- Born: June 23, 1943; Kindersley, Saskatchewan
- Died: December 22, 2008 (aged 65); Saskatoon, Saskatchewan

Team
- Curling club: Nutana CC, Saskatoon, SK

Curling career
- Member Association: Saskatchewan
- Brier: 2: (1980, 1988)
- World Championship: 1 (1980)
Medal record
Curling
Representing Canada
World Championships
Gold medal – first place	1980 Moncton
Representing Saskatchewan
Labatt Brier
Gold medal – first place	1980 Calgary
Silver medal – second place	1988 Chicoutimi

Ronald A. Mills (June 23, 1943 – December 22, 2008) was a Canadian curler from Saskatoon, Saskatchewan. He was a 1980 World Men's champion and a 1980 Brier champion.

Mills was a level four coach, and served as head statistician for the first five Continental Cups.

Mills worked for the Federated Co-Op for most of his life, where he worked in computer and internet technology skills, which he used in his work as a statistician for the Canadian Curling Association. He died of cancer.

== Awards ==
- Canadian Curling Hall of Fame: 1985 (with all 1980 World champions team skipped by Rick Folk)
- Saskatchewan Sports Hall of Fame: 1980 (1980 Rick Folk Curling Team)

== Teams ==
Season	Skip	Third	Second	Lead	Alternate	Events
1979–80	Rick Folk	Ron Mills	Tom Wilson	Jim Wilson		Brier 1980 (gold); WCC 1980 (gold)
1986–87	Eugene Hritzuk	Ron Mills	Ian Tetley	Bob Ursel		COCT 1987 (8th)
1987–88	Eugene Hritzuk	Del Shaughnessy	Murray Soparlo	Don Dabrowski	Ron Mills	Brier 1988 (silver)
