= Tom Wilson (curler) =

Canadian male curler

- Curler ♂

Team
- Curling club: Nutana CC, Saskatoon, SK

Curling career
- Member Association: Saskatchewan
- Brier: 3: (1978, 1979, 1980)
- World Championship: 1 (1980)
Medal record
Curling
Representing Canada
World Championships
Gold medal – first place	1980 Moncton
Representing Saskatchewan
Labatt Brier
Gold medal – first place	1980 Calgary
Silver medal – second place	1978 Vancouver
Silver medal – second place	1979 Ottawa

Thomas R. Wilson is a Canadian curler. He is a 1980 World Men's champion and a 1980 Brier champion.

== Awards ==
- Canadian Curling Hall of Fame: 1985 (with all 1980 World champions team skipped by Rick Folk)
- Saskatchewan Sports Hall of Fame:
  - 1980 (1980 Rick Folk Curling Team)
  - 2004 (1983 Rick Folk Mixed Curling Team)

== Teams ==
=== Men's ===
Season	Skip	Third	Second	Lead	Events
1977–78	Rick Folk	Bob Thompson	Tom Wilson	Rodger Schmidt	Brier 1978 (silver)
1978–79	Rick Folk	Bob Thompson	Tom Wilson	Jim Wilson	Brier 1979 (silver)
1979–80	Rick Folk	Ron Mills	Tom Wilson	Jim Wilson	Brier 1980 (gold); WCC 1980 (gold)

=== Mixed ===
Season	Skip	Third	Second	Lead	Events
1974	Rick Folk	Cheryl Stirton	Tom Wilson	Bonnie Orchard	CMxCC 1974 (gold)
1975	Rick Folk	Dorenda Schoenhals	Tom Wilson	Bonnie Orchard	CMxCC 1975 (?th)
1981	Rick Folk	Dorenda Schoenhals	Tom Wilson	Elizabeth Folk	CMxCC 1981
1982	Rick Folk	Dorenda Schoenhals	Tom Wilson	Elizabeth Folk	CMxCC 1982
1983	Rick Folk	Dorenda Schoenhals	Tom Wilson	Elizabeth Folk	CMxCC 1983 (gold)

== Personal life ==
His brother Jim is a curler too and Tom's teammate.
