= André Ferland =

Canadian curling coach

André Ferland (born in Drummondville, Quebec) is a Canadian curling coach. He is an inductee in the Canadian Curling Hall of Fame in the builder category, and is often known in curling circles as "Monsieur Curling."

== Coaching career ==
Ferland coached many teams through the years from the junior level to the senior level. He was the coach of two Quebec Canadian Junior champion teams, those skipped by Denis Marchand and by Michel Ferland, which won championships in 1980 and 1992, respectively. Ferland has coached teams at ten Canadian Junior Championships, two World Junior Championships, two Briers, and three Tournament of Hearts. He was also a CCA team leader at five World Junior Championships. He has also coached France at various championships, including the 2009 European Curling Championships, the 2008, 2009, and 2010 World Men's Curling Championships, and the 2010 Winter Olympics.

== Contributions to curling ==
Ferland is also well known as an innovator in the sport of curling. He is associated with popularizing the use of a stopwatch by sweepers to measure rock speed, which has come into widespread use. Ferland is also known for refining the "no-lift delivery," a technique which is now used extensively throughout the world by professional and recreational curlers. Ferland also experimented with an oval brush head that swivelled from the handle, a type of broom that was dubbed the "performance brush" and is now dominant in curling.
