= 1994 Canadian Junior Curling Championships =

The 1994 Pepsi Canadian Junior Curling Championships were held March 19 to 26 at the Colchester Legion Stadium in Truro, Nova Scotia.

Alberta's Colin Davison rink won the men's event in controversy, when they defeated the Northwest Territories' Kevin Koe rink 6–5 in an extra end. After Koe threw his last rock, the team's second Mark Whitehead jumped in celebration, but kicked an Alberta stone in the process. Neither of the teams, the officials or television replays could determine which team was shot rock before Whitehead burned it, and so the championship was given to Alberta. Had the Territories won, it would have been the only time a team from the north has won a Canadian curling championship.

== Men's ==
=== Teams ===
Province / Territory	Skip	Third	Second	Lead
Newfoundland	Joel Wetmore	Jason Peckham	Adam McLean	Jason Phillips
Nova Scotia	Dan MacLean	Stephen Hatherly	Karl Carter	Derek Andersen
New Brunswick	Mark Stonehouse	Chris Girouard	Craig McInnis	Dave Babcock
Prince Edward Island	Kyle Stevenson	AJ MacSwain	Robbie Gauthier	Terry Hood
Quebec	Philippe Lemay	Steve Beaudry	Pierre LePage	Patrice Rousseau
Ontario	Joe Frans	Shane McCready	Dale Matchett	Brad Anderson
Northern Ontario	Brad Minogue	Greg Cantin	Danny Visutski	Tyler Lockhart
Manitoba	Kevin MacKenzie	Ross McFadyen	Jim Bush	Todd Trevellyan
Saskatchewan	Neil Cursons	Pat Simmons	Rob Nixon	Jamie Burrows
Alberta	Colin Davison	Kelly Mittelstadt	Scott Pfeifer	Sean Morris
British Columbia	Trevor Perepolkin	Brendan Willis	Nathan Munk	David Orme
Northwest Territories/Yukon	Kevin Koe	Jamie Koe	Mark Whitehead	Kevin Whitehead

=== Standings ===
Locale	Skip	W	L
Quebec	Philippe Lemay	8	3
Northwest Territories/Yukon	Kevin Koe	8	3
Alberta	Colin Davison	8	3
Ontario	Joe Frans	7	4
Saskatchewan	Neil Cursons	6	5
Northern Ontario	Brad Minogue	6	5
New Brunswick	Mark Stonehouse	6	5
Manitoba	Kevin MacKenzie	5	6
Nova Scotia	Dan MacLean	4	7
British Columbia	Trevor Perepolkin	4	7
Prince Edward Island	Kyle Stevenson	2	9
Newfoundland	Joel Wetmore	2	9

=== Results ===
==== Draw 1 ====
Sheet A	1	2	3	4	5	6	7	8	9	10	Final
Northern Ontario (Minogue) 🔨	1	0	1	0	0	1	0	2	0	1	6
Ontario (Frans)	0	1	0	1	1	0	1	0	1	0	5

Sheet B	1	2	3	4	5	6	7	8	9	10	Final
Manitoba (MacKenzie) 🔨	1	1	1	0	2	3	0	1	0	X	8
Prince Edward Island (Stevenson)	0	0	0	1	0	0	2	0	1	X	4

Sheet E	1	2	3	4	5	6	7	8	9	10	Final
Saskatchewan (Cursons) 🔨	0	1	1	1	0	2	0	2	0	0	7
Newfoundland (Wetmore)	0	0	0	0	1	0	2	0	2	1	6

==== Draw 2 ====
Sheet C	1	2	3	4	5	6	7	8	9	10	Final
New Brunswick (Stonehouse) 🔨	3	0	2	0	1	0	X	X	X	X	6
Nova Scotia (MacLean)	0	1	0	1	0	1	X	X	X	X	3

Sheet D	1	2	3	4	5	6	7	8	9	10	11	Final
Alberta (Davison) 🔨	2	0	1	0	0	1	1	0	0	0	1	6
Northwest Territories/Yukon (Koe)	0	1	0	0	1	0	0	1	1	1	0	5

Sheet F	1	2	3	4	5	6	7	8	9	10	Final
Quebec (Lemay) 🔨	0	0	1	0	0	2	1	0	0	2	6
British Columbia (Perepolkin)	0	0	0	1	1	0	0	1	1	0	4

==== Draw 3 ====
Sheet A	1	2	3	4	5	6	7	8	9	10	Final
Prince Edward Island (Stevenson) 🔨	0	0	1	0	0	1	0	0	X	X	2
Quebec (Lemay)	1	2	0	2	2	0	0	0	X	X	7

Sheet D	1	2	3	4	5	6	7	8	9	10	11	Final
British Columbia (Perepolkin) 🔨	1	0	4	0	0	1	0	0	1	0	0	7
Nova Scotia (MacLean)	0	2	0	1	1	0	0	2	0	1	2	9

Sheet F	1	2	3	4	5	6	7	8	9	10	Final
Manitoba (MacKenzie) 🔨	0	2	0	0	0	0	0	1	1	0	4
New Brunswick (Stonehouse)	0	0	2	0	0	1	2	0	0	1	6

==== Draw 4 ====
Sheet B	1	2	3	4	5	6	7	8	9	10	Final
Ontario (Frans) 🔨	2	0	0	0	2	0	2	0	1	3	10
Saskatchewan (Cursons)	0	1	1	1	0	3	0	2	0	0	8

Sheet C	1	2	3	4	5	6	7	8	9	10	Final
Newfoundland (Wetmore) 🔨	0	0	0	0	1	0	0	0	1	X	2
Alberta (Davison)	0	1	1	1	0	1	1	0	0	X	5

Sheet E	1	2	3	4	5	6	7	8	9	10	Final
Northern Ontario (Minogue) 🔨	1	0	0	1	0	2	0	2	0	X	6
Northwest Territories/Yukon (Koe)	0	2	0	0	4	0	3	0	1	X	10

==== Draw 5 ====
Sheet A	1	2	3	4	5	6	7	8	9	10	Final
British Columbia (Perepolkin) 🔨	0	0	0	3	5	2	X	X	X	X	10
New Brunswick (Stonehouse)	0	1	0	0	0	0	X	X	X	X	1

Sheet C	1	2	3	4	5	6	7	8	9	10	Final
Quebec (Lemay) 🔨	0	3	1	0	2	0	1	0	1	X	8
Manitoba (MacKenzie)	0	0	0	1	0	1	0	1	0	X	3

Sheet E	1	2	3	4	5	6	7	8	9	10	Final
Nova Scotia (MacLean) 🔨	3	1	0	2	0	0	0	0	0	X	6
Prince Edward Island (Stevenson)	0	0	1	0	1	2	2	3	0	X	9

==== Draw 6 ====
Sheet B	1	2	3	4	5	6	7	8	9	10	Final
Northwest Territories/Yukon (Koe) 🔨	0	4	0	3	1	0	2	1	0	X	11
Newfoundland (Wetmore)	1	0	1	0	0	3	0	0	1	X	6

Sheet D	1	2	3	4	5	6	7	8	9	10	Final
Saskatchewan (Cursons) 🔨	3	0	0	2	1	0	0	0	1	X	7
Northern Ontario (Minogue)	0	1	1	0	0	1	1	0	0	X	4

Sheet F	1	2	3	4	5	6	7	8	9	10	Final
Ontario (Frans) 🔨	1	0	3	0	2	0	1	0	0	1	8
Alberta (Davison)	0	2	0	0	0	2	0	1	1	0	6

==== Draw 7 ====
Sheet B	1	2	3	4	5	6	7	8	9	10	Final
Alberta (Davison) 🔨	0	0	1	0	2	0	1	1	0	2	7
Northern Ontario (Minogue)	1	1	0	1	0	2	0	0	1	0	6

Sheet D	1	2	3	4	5	6	7	8	9	10	Final
Newfoundland (Wetmore) 🔨	0	0	0	4	1	0	2	0	2	0	9
Ontario (Frans)	1	3	1	0	0	3	0	2	0	2	12

Sheet F	1	2	3	4	5	6	7	8	9	10	Final
Northwest Territories/Yukon (Koe) 🔨	0	4	0	0	0	0	2	0	0	0	6
Saskatchewan (Cursons)	0	0	2	1	0	1	0	2	1	1	8

==== Draw 8 ====
Sheet A	1	2	3	4	5	6	7	8	9	10	Final
Nova Scotia (MacLean) 🔨	1	0	2	0	1	0	0	2	0	1	7
Manitoba (MacKenzie)	0	1	0	2	0	2	0	0	1	0	6

Sheet C	1	2	3	4	5	6	7	8	9	10	Final
Prince Edward Island (Stevenson) 🔨	1	0	1	0	1	0	0	2	0	0	5
British Columbia (Perepolkin)	0	1	0	1	0	1	0	0	3	1	7

Sheet E	1	2	3	4	5	6	7	8	9	10	Final
New Brunswick (Stonehouse) 🔨	0	1	0	0	0	3	0	2	0	1	7
Quebec (Lemay)	0	0	0	3	1	0	1	0	1	0	6

==== Draw 9 ====
Sheet A	1	2	3	4	5	6	7	8	9	10	Final
Saskatchewan (Cursons) 🔨	1	0	3	0	0	3	1	X	X	X	8
Alberta (Davison)	0	1	0	1	1	0	0	X	X	X	3

Sheet C	1	2	3	4	5	6	7	8	9	10	Final
Ontario (Frans) 🔨	1	0	2	0	3	0	2	1	0	X	9
Northwest Territories/Yukon (Koe)	0	1	0	1	0	2	0	0	2	X	6

Sheet F	1	2	3	4	5	6	7	8	9	10	Final
Northern Ontario (Minogue) 🔨	0	1	0	1	0	0	0	0	X	X	2
Newfoundland (Wetmore)	1	0	1	0	2	1	2	1	X	X	8

==== Draw 10 ====
Sheet B	1	2	3	4	5	6	7	8	9	10	Final
Quebec (Lemay) 🔨	1	0	2	0	0	1	0	1	3	1	9
Nova Scotia (MacLean)	0	2	0	2	2	0	2	0	0	0	8

Sheet D	1	2	3	4	5	6	7	8	9	10	Final
New Brunswick (Stonehouse) 🔨	1	0	2	0	2	1	0	0	3	2	11
Prince Edward Island (Stevenson)	0	2	0	3	0	0	3	0	0	0	8

Sheet E	1	2	3	4	5	6	7	8	9	10	Final
Manitoba (MacKenzie) 🔨	1	0	0	2	0	2	0	1	0	0	6
British Columbia (Perepolkin)	0	0	0	0	2	0	1	0	1	1	5

==== Draw 12 ====
Sheet A	1	2	3	4	5	6	7	8	9	10	Final
British Columbia (Perepolkin) 🔨	1	0	0	2	0	2	0	1	0	2	8
Ontario (Frans)	0	1	1	0	1	0	1	0	1	0	5

Sheet B	1	2	3	4	5	6	7	8	9	10	Final
Newfoundland (Wetmore) 🔨	1	0	2	0	1	0	1	0	1	0	6
New Brunswick (Stonehouse)	0	2	0	2	0	3	0	0	0	1	8

Sheet C	1	2	3	4	5	6	7	8	9	10	Final
Manitoba (MacKenzie) 🔨	2	0	0	0	1	0	1	1	0	1	6
Northern Ontario (Minogue)	0	0	0	2	0	1	0	0	1	0	4

Sheet D	1	2	3	4	5	6	7	8	9	10	Final
Northwest Territories/Yukon (Koe) 🔨	2	3	2	0	1	0	2	0	2	0	12
Quebec (Lemay)	0	0	0	1	0	4	0	1	0	1	7

Sheet E	1	2	3	4	5	6	7	8	9	10	Final
Nova Scotia (MacLean) 🔨	1	0	1	1	0	1	0	1	0	1	6
Alberta (Davison)	0	2	0	0	2	0	2	0	1	0	7

Sheet F	1	2	3	4	5	6	7	8	9	10	Final
Saskatchewan (Cursons) 🔨	1	1	0	2	0	0	1	1	0	X	6
Prince Edward Island (Stevenson)	0	0	0	0	0	2	0	0	2	X	4

==== Draw 14 ====
Sheet A	1	2	3	4	5	6	7	8	9	10	11	Final
New Brunswick (Stonehouse) 🔨	0	0	0	0	3	0	0	0	0	2	0	5
Northwest Territories/Yukon (Koe)	0	0	0	0	0	2	1	1	1	0	2	7

Sheet B	1	2	3	4	5	6	7	8	9	10	Final
Northern Ontario (Minogue) 🔨	0	1	0	1	2	4	X	X	X	X	8
Nova Scotia (MacLean)	0	0	0	0	0	0	X	X	X	X	0

Sheet C	1	2	3	4	5	6	7	8	9	10	Final
British Columbia (Perepolkin) 🔨	1	0	0	0	0	0	X	X	X	X	1
Saskatchewan (Cursons)	0	3	1	2	2	2	X	X	X	X	10

Sheet D	1	2	3	4	5	6	7	8	9	10	Final
Alberta (Davison) 🔨	0	1	1	0	1	1	2	0	1	X	7
Manitoba (MacKenzie)	1	0	0	1	0	0	0	1	0	X	3

Sheet E	1	2	3	4	5	6	7	8	9	10	Final
Prince Edward Island (Stevenson) 🔨	0	1	0	3	0	0	1	0	0	X	5
Ontario (Frans)	0	0	1	0	3	1	0	0	3	X	8

Sheet F	1	2	3	4	5	6	7	8	9	10	Final
Quebec (Lemay) 🔨	2	4	3	1	0	0	2	X	X	X	12
Newfoundland (Wetmore)	0	0	0	0	2	0	0	X	X	X	2

==== Draw 15 ====
Sheet A	1	2	3	4	5	6	7	8	9	10	Final
Saskatchewan (Cursons) 🔨	2	0	1	1	0	0	2	0	0	0	6
Nova Scotia (MacLean)	0	1	0	0	2	1	0	1	1	1	7

Sheet B	1	2	3	4	5	6	7	8	9	10	Final
Northwest Territories/Yukon (Koe) 🔨	0	0	0	5	1	0	0	1	0	1	8
British Columbia (Perepolkin)	0	2	2	0	0	2	0	0	1	0	7

Sheet C	1	2	3	4	5	6	7	8	9	10	Final
Northern Ontario (Minogue) 🔨	0	2	0	0	1	1	0	0	2	0	6
Quebec (Lemay)	1	0	1	0	0	0	0	2	0	1	5

Sheet D	1	2	3	4	5	6	7	8	9	10	11	Final
Newfoundland (Wetmore) 🔨	0	0	2	0	0	2	0	0	1	1	0	6
Prince Edward Island (Stevenson)	1	1	0	1	1	0	1	1	0	0	1	7

Sheet E	1	2	3	4	5	6	7	8	9	10	Final
Alberta (Davison) 🔨	0	3	0	2	0	2	0	1	2	X	10
New Brunswick (Stonehouse)	0	0	1	0	2	0	2	0	0	X	5

Sheet F	1	2	3	4	5	6	7	8	9	10	Final
Ontario (Frans) 🔨	0	0	0	3	0	3	0	1	0	X	7
Manitoba (MacKenzie)	0	3	1	0	3	0	3	0	3	X	13

==== Draw 17 ====
Sheet A	1	2	3	4	5	6	7	8	9	10	Final
Prince Edward Island (Stevenson) 🔨	1	1	0	1	0	0	0	0	X	X	3
Northern Ontario (Minogue)	0	0	2	0	2	1	2	1	X	X	8

Sheet B	1	2	3	4	5	6	7	8	9	10	Final
New Brunswick (Stonehouse) 🔨	0	1	0	0	0	1	0	1	0	X	3
Ontario (Frans)	1	0	2	1	1	0	2	0	1	X	8

Sheet C	1	2	3	4	5	6	7	8	9	10	Final
Nova Scotia (MacLean) 🔨	0	1	0	1	1	0	2	2	0	X	7
Newfoundland (Wetmore)	1	0	1	0	0	1	0	0	2	X	5

Sheet D	1	2	3	4	5	6	7	8	9	10	Final
Quebec (Lemay) 🔨	0	3	1	0	2	0	2	0	0	2	10
Saskatchewan (Cursons)	0	0	0	2	0	2	0	3	0	0	7

Sheet E	1	2	3	4	5	6	7	8	9	10	11	Final
Manitoba (MacKenzie) 🔨	3	1	0	1	0	1	0	1	0	1	0	8
Northwest Territories/Yukon (Koe)	0	0	2	0	3	0	2	0	1	0	1	9

Sheet F	1	2	3	4	5	6	7	8	9	10	Final
British Columbia (Perepolkin) 🔨	0	0	0	1	0	0	X	X	X	X	1
Alberta (Davison)	1	2	1	0	3	1	X	X	X	X	8

==== Draw 19 ====
Sheet A	1	2	3	4	5	6	7	8	9	10	Final
Alberta (Davison) 🔨	2	1	0	0	0	0	3	0	0	X	6
Quebec (Lemay)	0	0	3	1	2	0	0	3	2	X	11

Sheet B	1	2	3	4	5	6	7	8	9	10	Final
Manitoba (MacKenzie) 🔨	0	3	0	2	3	0	1	X	X	X	9
Saskatchewan (Cursons)	0	0	1	0	0	2	0	X	X	X	3

Sheet C	1	2	3	4	5	6	7	8	9	10	Final
Northwest Territories/Yukon (Koe) 🔨	1	0	0	0	0	2	2	0	1	2	8
Prince Edward Island (Stevenson)	0	2	1	1	1	0	0	1	0	0	6

Sheet D	1	2	3	4	5	6	7	8	9	10	Final
Ontario (Frans) 🔨	1	1	1	1	0	2	0	1	X	X	7
Nova Scotia (MacLean)	0	0	0	0	1	0	1	0	X	X	2

Sheet E	1	2	3	4	5	6	7	8	9	10	Final
British Columbia (Willis) 🔨	2	2	0	1	0	0	1	0	3	X	9
Newfoundland (Wetmore)	0	0	1	0	1	1	0	3	0	X	6

Sheet F	1	2	3	4	5	6	7	8	9	10	Final
New Brunswick (Stonehouse) 🔨	2	0	0	1	0	0	0	1	1	0	5
Northern Ontario (Minogue)	0	1	0	0	0	3	0	0	0	2	6

==== Draw 21 ====
Sheet A	1	2	3	4	5	6	7	8	9	10	11	Final
Newfoundland (Wetmore) 🔨	0	2	0	0	2	1	0	1	0	0	2	8
Manitoba (MacKenzie)	0	0	1	0	0	0	2	0	2	1	0	6

Sheet B	1	2	3	4	5	6	7	8	9	10	Final
Prince Edward Island (Stevenson) 🔨	1	0	0	1	0	1	0	0	1	X	4
Alberta (Davison)	0	1	1	0	1	0	3	2	0	X	8

Sheet C	1	2	3	4	5	6	7	8	9	10	Final
Saskatchewan (Cursons) 🔨	1	2	0	1	0	0	0	2	0	0	6
New Brunswick (Stonehouse)	0	0	1	0	4	0	2	0	0	1	8

Sheet D	1	2	3	4	5	6	7	8	9	10	Final
Northern Ontario (Minogue) 🔨	0	0	1	1	1	1	0	1	0	X	5
British Columbia (Perepolkin)	0	2	0	0	0	0	1	0	1	X	4

Sheet E	1	2	3	4	5	6	7	8	9	10	Final
Quebec (Lemay) 🔨	1	1	0	0	4	0	0	2	0	X	8
Ontario (Frans)	0	0	0	1	0	1	1	0	1	X	4

Sheet F	1	2	3	4	5	6	7	8	9	10	Final
Nova Scotia (MacLean) 🔨	0	1	0	0	2	0	1	0	0	X	4
Northwest Territories/Yukon (Koe)	0	0	2	2	0	1	0	0	2	X	7

=== Playoffs ===
Semifinal		Final
		Northwest Territories/Yukon	5
Alberta	5	Alberta	6
Quebec	2

==== Semifinal ====
Sheet D	1	2	3	4	5	6	7	8	9	10	Final
Alberta (Davison)	1	0	0	1	0	0	2	1	0	X	5
Quebec (Lemay) 🔨	0	0	0	0	0	1	0	0	1	X	2

Player percentages
Alberta		Quebec	
Sean Morris	94%	Patrice Rousseau	75%
Scott Pfeifer	83%	Pierre LePage	68%
Kelly Mittelstadt	64%	Steve Beaudry	69%
Colin Davison	82%	Philippe Lemay	46%
Total	80%	Total	65%

==== Final ====
Sheet C	1	2	3	4	5	6	7	8	9	10	11	Final
Northwest Territories/Yukon (Koe)	0	0	1	0	1	0	1	0	2	0	0	5
Alberta (Davison) 🔨	0	0	0	1	0	1	0	1	0	2	1	6

Player percentages
Northwest Territories/Yukon		Alberta	
Kevin Whitehead	77%	Sean Morris	86%
Mark Whitehead	73%	Scott Pfeifer	83%
Jamie Koe	67%	Kelly Mittelstadt	74%
Kevin Koe	83%	Colin Davison	89%
Total	75%	Total	83%

== Women's ==
=== Teams ===
Province / Territory	Skip	Third	Second	Lead
Newfoundland	Gina Stanley	Michelle Letto	Sabine Wasser	Carla Avery
Nova Scotia	Susan Pettipas	Lori MacDonald	Krista Archibald	Lynn MacDonald
New Brunswick	Susie Leblanc	Paula Nicol	Allison Franey	Pamela Nicol
Prince Edward Island	Krista Cameron	Shannon Perry	Cheryl King	Peggy Miles
Quebec	Karine Marchand	Dominique Cadorette	Valerie Leclerc	Karine Desbiens
Ontario	Dominique Lascelles	Katherine Pilon	Julie Leonard	Mylene Rochon
Northern Ontario	Rohonda Halvorsen	Lisa Backman	Tiffany Stubbings	Michelle Boland
Manitoba	Jennifer Jones	Trisha Baldwin	Jill Officer	Dana Malanchuk
Saskatchewan	Sherry Linton	Cindy Street	Angela Street	Allison Tanner
Alberta	Crystal Rumberg	Margo Wright	Lawnie Goodfellow	Paula MacLeod
British Columbia	Jeanna Richard	Tracey Martin	Sandra Stoutenburg	Brenda Henderson
Northwest Territories/Yukon	Tara Hammer	Kerry Koe	Kim Barraclough	Sheena Yakeleya

=== Standings ===
Locale	Skip	W	L
Saskatchewan	Sherry Linton	9	2
British Columbia	Jeanna Richard	8	3
Ontario	Dominique Lascelles	7	4
Northern Ontario	Rohonda Halvorsen	7	4
Manitoba	Jennifer Jones	7	4
New Brunswick	Susie Leblanc	6	5
Alberta	Crystal Rumberg	6	5
Northwest Territories/Yukon	Tara Hammer	5	6
Prince Edward Island	Krista Cameron	4	7
Quebec	Karine Marchand	3	8
Newfoundland	Gina Stanley	2	9
Nova Scotia	Susan Pettipas	2	9

=== Results ===
==== Draw 1 ====
Sheet C	1	2	3	4	5	6	7	8	9	10	Final
Alberta (Rumberg) 🔨	1	0	1	0	0	0	2	2	0	X	6
Northwest Territories/Yukon (Hammer)	0	2	0	4	1	1	0	0	3	X	11

Sheet D	1	2	3	4	5	6	7	8	9	10	Final
New Brunswick (Leblanc) 🔨	1	0	0	2	1	0	1	1	0	X	6
Nova Scotia (Pettipas)	0	1	0	0	0	1	0	0	2	X	4

Sheet F	1	2	3	4	5	6	7	8	9	10	Final
Northern Ontario (Halverson) 🔨	1	0	0	3	1	0	2	1	0	X	8
Ontario (Lascelles)	0	1	2	0	0	1	0	0	1	X	5

==== Draw 2 ====
Sheet A	1	2	3	4	5	6	7	8	9	10	Final
Quebec (Marchand) 🔨	2	0	0	1	0	0	0	0	X	X	3
British Columbia (Richard)	0	2	0	0	2	1	1	2	X	X	8

Sheet B	1	2	3	4	5	6	7	8	9	10	Final
Saskatchewan (Linton) 🔨	2	0	0	2	0	0	0	3	0	2	9
Newfoundland (Stanley)	0	2	0	0	2	1	0	0	2	0	7

Sheet E	1	2	3	4	5	6	7	8	9	10	Final
Manitoba (Jones) 🔨	0	2	1	0	1	2	1	3	X	X	10
Prince Edward Island (Cameron)	1	0	0	1	0	0	0	0	X	X	2

==== Draw 3 ====
Sheet B	1	2	3	4	5	6	7	8	9	10	Final
Manitoba (Jones) 🔨	1	1	3	1	2	2	X	X	X	X	10
New Brunswick (Leblanc)	0	0	0	0	0	0	X	X	X	X	0

Sheet C	1	2	3	4	5	6	7	8	9	10	Final
British Columbia (Richard) 🔨	0	0	1	1	0	1	0	1	0	0	4
Nova Scotia (Pettipas)	0	1	0	0	1	0	1	0	1	1	5

Sheet E	1	2	3	4	5	6	7	8	9	10	Final
Prince Edward Island (Cameron) 🔨	0	1	0	1	0	1	0	0	0	X	3
Quebec (Marchand)	0	0	3	0	1	0	1	0	0	X	5

==== Draw 4 ====
Sheet A	1	2	3	4	5	6	7	8	9	10	Final
Northern Ontario (Halvorsen) 🔨	3	0	2	0	0	5	0	1	X	X	11
Northwest Territories/Yukon (Hammer)	0	1	0	1	2	0	1	0	X	X	5

Sheet D	1	2	3	4	5	6	7	8	9	10	Final
Newfoundland (Stanley) 🔨	2	1	0	0	0	0	0	2	1	0	6
Alberta (Rumberg)	0	0	0	2	1	1	1	0	0	2	7

Sheet F	1	2	3	4	5	6	7	8	9	10	Final
Ontario (Lascelles) 🔨	2	1	1	2	0	1	0	1	2	X	10
Saskatchewan (Linton)	0	0	0	0	1	0	2	0	0	X	3

==== Draw 5 ====
Sheet B	1	2	3	4	5	6	7	8	9	10	Final
Nova Scotia (Pettipas) 🔨	0	0	0	0	1	0	X	X	X	X	1
Prince Edward Island (Cameron)	1	3	1	1	0	3	X	X	X	X	9

Sheet D	1	2	3	4	5	6	7	8	9	10	Final
Quebec (Marchand) 🔨	1	0	1	0	1	0	0	0	1	X	4
Manitoba (Jones)	0	1	0	3	0	2	0	1	0	X	7

Sheet F	1	2	3	4	5	6	7	8	9	10	Final
British Columbia (Richard) 🔨	2	1	2	3	1	X	X	X	X	X	9
New Brunswick (Leblanc)	0	0	0	0	0	X	X	X	X	X	0

==== Draw 6 ====
Sheet A	1	2	3	4	5	6	7	8	9	10	Final
Ontario (Lascelles) 🔨	0	0	0	2	0	1	0	0	1	0	4
Alberta (Rumberg)	1	1	0	0	1	0	0	1	0	1	5

Sheet C	1	2	3	4	5	6	7	8	9	10	Final
Saskatchewan (Linton) 🔨	0	1	1	1	1	0	0	2	1	X	7
Northern Ontario (Halvorsen)	0	0	0	0	0	2	1	0	0	X	3

Sheet E	1	2	3	4	5	6	7	8	9	10	Final
Northwest Territories/Yukon (Hammer) 🔨	1	1	0	0	2	0	0	2	0	1	7
Newfoundland (Stanley)	0	0	1	3	0	0	0	0	2	0	6

==== Draw 7 ====
Sheet A	1	2	3	4	5	6	7	8	9	10	Final
Northwest Territories/Yukon (Hammer) 🔨	1	0	0	2	0	0	1	0	2	X	6
Saskatchewan (Linton)	0	2	1	0	3	2	0	1	0	X	9

Sheet C	1	2	3	4	5	6	7	8	9	10	Final
Newfoundland (Stanley) 🔨	2	0	0	1	0	1	0	0	1	X	5
Ontario (Lascelles)	0	2	2	0	2	0	1	2	0	X	9

Sheet E	1	2	3	4	5	6	7	8	9	10	Final
Alberta (Rumberg) 🔨	1	0	0	0	0	1	0	0	0	X	2
Northern Ontario (Halvorsen)	0	0	1	1	1	0	0	0	2	X	5

==== Draw 8 ====
Sheet B	1	2	3	4	5	6	7	8	9	10	Final
New Brunswick (Leblanc) 🔨	1	0	0	0	1	1	1	2	0	3	9
Quebec (Marchand)	0	0	0	2	0	0	0	0	3	0	5

Sheet D	1	2	3	4	5	6	7	8	9	10	Final
Prince Edward Island (Cameron) 🔨	1	0	0	0	1	1	0	0	1	0	4
British Columbia (Richard)	0	0	1	1	0	0	1	1	0	1	5

Sheet F	1	2	3	4	5	6	7	8	9	10	Final
Nova Scotia (Pettipas) 🔨	0	0	0	2	0	0	1	0	0	X	3
Manitoba (Jones)	0	1	1	0	2	0	0	1	3	X	8

==== Draw 9 ====
Sheet B	1	2	3	4	5	6	7	8	9	10	Final
Northern Ontario (Halvorsen) 🔨	0	2	0	0	0	3	0	0	1	X	6
Newfoundland (Stanley)	0	0	0	2	1	0	0	0	0	X	3

Sheet D	1	2	3	4	5	6	7	8	9	10	Final
Ontario (Lascelles) 🔨	0	2	2	0	1	0	1	0	2	X	8
Northwest Territories/Yukon (Hammer)	0	0	0	1	0	2	0	1	0	X	4

Sheet E	1	2	3	4	5	6	7	8	9	10	Final
Saskatchewan (Linton) 🔨	0	0	1	0	1	0	1	0	0	2	5
Alberta (Rumberg)	0	0	0	2	0	1	0	1	0	0	4

==== Draw 10 ====
Sheet A	1	2	3	4	5	6	7	8	9	10	Final
Manitoba (Jones) 🔨	0	2	0	0	0	1	0	2	0	X	5
British Columbia (Richard)	1	0	0	2	3	0	2	0	1	X	9

Sheet C	1	2	3	4	5	6	7	8	9	10	Final
New Brunswick (Leblanc) 🔨	1	1	0	0	1	0	0	0	0	0	3
Prince Edward Island (Cameron)	0	0	0	1	0	1	0	0	2	1	5

Sheet F	1	2	3	4	5	6	7	8	9	10	Final
Quebec (Marchand) 🔨	2	2	0	0	0	0	0	0	2	1	7
Nova Scotia (Pettipas)	0	0	1	0	0	1	3	1	0	0	6

==== Draw 11 ====
Sheet A	1	2	3	4	5	6	7	8	9	10	Final
Saskatchewan (Linton) 🔨	0	2	0	2	1	0	2	X	X	X	7
Prince Edward Island (Cameron)	0	0	0	0	0	2	0	X	X	X	2

Sheet B	1	2	3	4	5	6	7	8	9	10	Final
Nova Scotia (Pettipas) 🔨	0	3	0	0	0	5	1	0	2	1	12
Alberta (Rumberg)	2	0	3	2	2	0	0	1	0	0	10

Sheet C	1	2	3	4	5	6	7	8	9	10	Final
Northwest Territories/Yukon (Hammer) 🔨	1	1	0	2	1	0	1	0	0	1	7
Quebec (Marchand)	0	0	2	0	0	3	0	0	0	0	5

Sheet D	1	2	3	4	5	6	7	8	9	10	Final
Manitoba (Jones) 🔨	5	0	4	2	X	X	X	X	X	X	11
Northern Ontario (Halvorsen)	0	1	0	0	X	X	X	X	X	X	1

Sheet E	1	2	3	4	5	6	7	8	9	10	Final
Newfoundland (Stanley) 🔨	2	0	0	0	0	2	0	1	0	X	5
New Brunswick (Leblanc)	0	2	3	1	1	0	2	0	1	X	10

Sheet F	1	2	3	4	5	6	7	8	9	10	Final
British Columbia (Richard) 🔨	1	1	0	1	0	1	0	0	0	X	4
Ontario (Lascelles)	0	0	2	0	1	0	0	2	1	X	6

==== Draw 13 ====
Sheet A	1	2	3	4	5	6	7	8	9	10	Final
Quebec (Marchand) 🔨	0	3	0	0	1	0	1	0	2	X	7
Newfoundland (Stanley)	0	0	1	0	0	2	0	0	0	X	3

Sheet B	1	2	3	4	5	6	7	8	9	10	Final
Prince Edward Island (Cameron) 🔨	2	0	0	0	1	0	2	0	2	1	8
Ontario (Lascelles)	0	1	1	2	0	1	0	2	0	0	7

Sheet C	1	2	3	4	5	6	7	8	9	10	Final
Alberta (Rumberg) 🔨	2	1	1	0	0	2	0	4	X	X	10
Manitoba (Jones)	0	0	0	2	1	0	1	0	X	X	4

Sheet D	1	2	3	4	5	6	7	8	9	10	Final
British Columbia (Richard) 🔨	1	0	2	1	0	0	1	0	0	1	6
Saskatchewan (Linton)	0	0	0	0	1	1	0	2	0	0	4

Sheet E	1	2	3	4	5	6	7	8	9	10	Final
Northern Ontario (Halvorsen) 🔨	1	0	0	0	2	0	1	1	0	X	5
Nova Scotia (Pettipas)	0	0	0	1	0	1	0	0	1	X	3

Sheet F	1	2	3	4	5	6	7	8	9	10	Final
New Brunswick (Leblanc) 🔨	0	0	0	1	0	0	0	2	1	2	6
Northwest Territories/Yukon (Hammer)	1	0	1	0	0	2	1	0	0	0	5

==== Draw 16 ====
Sheet A	1	2	3	4	5	6	7	8	9	10	11	Final
Ontario (Lascelles) 🔨	3	1	1	0	1	0	0	3	0	0	1	10
Manitoba (Jones)	0	0	0	3	0	2	1	0	2	1	0	9

Sheet B	1	2	3	4	5	6	7	8	9	10	Final
Alberta (Rumberg) 🔨	0	0	0	2	0	1	0	1	0	0	4
New Brunswick (Leblanc)	1	1	0	0	1	0	1	0	0	1	5

Sheet C	1	2	3	4	5	6	7	8	9	10	Final
Newfoundland (Stanley) 🔨	1	0	0	0	0	0	1	1	2	X	5
Prince Edward Island (Cameron)	0	0	0	3	0	0	0	0	0	X	3

Sheet D	1	2	3	4	5	6	7	8	9	10	Final
Northern Ontario (Halvorsen) 🔨	2	0	1	0	1	1	0	0	1	1	7
Quebec (Marchand)	0	2	0	2	0	0	0	1	0	0	5

Sheet E	1	2	3	4	5	6	7	8	9	10	Final
Northwest Territories/Yukon (Hammer) 🔨	0	2	0	1	0	0	0	0	1	0	4
British Columbia (Richard)	0	0	1	0	0	1	2	1	0	1	6

Sheet F	1	2	3	4	5	6	7	8	9	10	Final
Saskatchewan (Linton) 🔨	1	0	2	2	2	0	2	0	1	X	10
Nova Scotia (Pettipas)	0	4	0	0	0	1	0	1	0	X	6

==== Draw 18 ====
Sheet A	1	2	3	4	5	6	7	8	9	10	Final
British Columbia (Richard) 🔨	0	0	1	0	1	1	0	0	0	1	4
Alberta (Rumberg)	1	0	0	1	0	0	1	1	1	0	5

Sheet B	1	2	3	4	5	6	7	8	9	10	Final
Manitoba (Jones) 🔨	2	3	2	3	1	0	X	X	X	X	11
Northwest Territories/Yukon (Hammer)	0	0	0	0	0	1	X	X	X	X	1

Sheet C	1	2	3	4	5	6	7	8	9	10	Final
Quebec (Marchand) 🔨	0	0	2	1	0	1	0	1	X	X	5
Saskatchewan (Linton)	2	1	0	0	3	0	4	0	X	X	10

Sheet D	1	2	3	4	5	6	7	8	9	10	Final
Nova Scotia (Pettipas) 🔨	0	2	1	0	1	0	1	0	1	0	6
Newfoundland (Stanley)	2	0	0	1	0	0	0	3	0	1	7

Sheet E	1	2	3	4	5	6	7	8	9	10	Final
New Brunswick (Leblanc) 🔨	0	0	1	0	1	2	2	3	0	X	9
Ontario (Lascelles)	0	1	0	1	0	0	0	0	3	X	5

Sheet F	1	2	3	4	5	6	7	8	9	10	11	Final
Prince Edward Island (Cameron) 🔨	0	1	3	0	0	0	1	0	0	0	1	6
Northern Ontario (Halvorsen)	0	0	0	2	0	1	0	0	0	2	0	5

==== Draw 20 ====
Sheet A	1	2	3	4	5	6	7	8	9	10	Final
New Brunswick (Leblanc) 🔨	0	0	1	0	0	1	1	0	0	1	4
Northern Ontario (Halvorsen)	1	1	0	0	1	0	0	1	1	0	5

Sheet B	1	2	3	4	5	6	7	8	9	10	Final
British Columbia (Richard) 🔨	0	1	0	0	2	0	0	2	0	1	6
Newfoundland (Stanley)	1	0	0	1	0	1	0	0	1	0	4

Sheet C	1	2	3	4	5	6	7	8	9	10	Final
Ontario (Lascelles) 🔨	0	1	0	1	0	1	0	3	0	2	8
Nova Scotia (Pettipas)	1	0	1	0	1	0	1	0	2	0	6

Sheet D	1	2	3	4	5	6	7	8	9	10	Final
Northwest Territories/Yukon (Hammer) 🔨	1	2	0	1	1	0	2	2	X	X	9
Prince Edward Island (Cameron)	0	0	1	0	0	3	0	0	X	X	4

Sheet E	1	2	3	4	5	6	7	8	9	10	Final
Manitoba (Jones) 🔨	0	2	0	0	2	0	0	0	0	X	4
Saskatchewan (Linton)	1	0	2	1	0	2	0	0	1	X	7

Sheet F	1	2	3	4	5	6	7	8	9	10	Final
Alberta (Rumberg) 🔨	2	0	0	0	0	0	2	0	2	X	6
Quebec (Marchand)	0	0	2	0	0	1	0	1	0	X	4

==== Draw 22 ====
Sheet A	1	2	3	4	5	6	7	8	9	10	Final
Nova Scotia (Pettipas) 🔨	1	0	0	0	0	1	0	3	0	X	5
Northwest Territories/Yukon (Hammer)	0	1	1	2	1	0	1	0	3	X	9

Sheet B	1	2	3	4	5	6	7	8	9	10	Final
Quebec (Marchand) 🔨	0	2	0	0	1	0	3	0	2	0	8
Ontario (Lascelles)	1	0	1	3	0	1	0	2	0	3	11

Sheet C	1	2	3	4	5	6	7	8	9	10	Final
Northern Ontario (Halvorsen) 🔨	0	0	0	1	0	1	0	2	0	X	4
British Columbia (Richard)	1	2	1	0	1	0	3	0	2	X	10

Sheet D	1	2	3	4	5	6	7	8	9	10	Final
Saskatchewan (Linton) 🔨	0	2	0	2	0	1	1	0	1	X	7
New Brunswick (Leblanc)	1	0	1	0	0	0	0	1	0	X	3

Sheet E	1	2	3	4	5	6	7	8	9	10	11	Final
Prince Edward Island (Cameron) 🔨	0	1	0	5	0	1	0	2	0	2	0	11
Alberta (Rumberg)	1	0	3	0	2	0	3	0	2	0	1	12

Sheet F	1	2	3	4	5	6	7	8	9	10	Final
Newfoundland (Stanley) 🔨	2	0	0	2	0	1	0	2	0	0	7
Manitoba (Jones)	0	3	1	0	3	0	0	0	0	1	8

=== Playoffs ===
Tiebreaker #1
Manitoba	10
Northern Ontario	4

Tiebreaker #2
Manitoba	10
Ontario	8

Semifinal
Manitoba	5
British Columbia	3

Final
Saskatchewan	5
Manitoba	8

==== Tiebreaker #1 ====
Sheet C	1	2	3	4	5	6	7	8	9	10	Final
Manitoba (Jones) 🔨	1	0	1	1	0	1	0	4	2	X	10
Northern Ontario (Halvorsen)	0	1	0	0	1	0	2	0	0	X	4

Player percentages
Manitoba		Northern Ontario	
Dana Malanchuk	64%	Michelle Boland	83%
Jill Officer	75%	Tiffany Stubbings	68%
Trisha Baldwin	76%	Lisa Backman	53%
Jennifer Jones	71%	Rohonda Halvorsen	64%
Total	72%	Total	67%

==== Tiebreaker #2 ====
Sheet B	1	2	3	4	5	6	7	8	9	10	Final
Manitoba (Jones)	0	5	0	1	0	3	0	1	0	X	10
Ontario (Lascelles) 🔨	2	0	2	0	2	0	1	0	1	X	8

Player percentages
Manitoba		Ontario	
Dana Malanchuk	79%	Mylene Rochon	74%
Jill Officer	80%	Julie Leonard	78%
Trisha Baldwin	70%	Katherine Pilon	65%
Jennifer Jones	86%	Dominique Lascelles	84%
Total	79%	Total	75%

==== Semifinal ====
Sheet C	1	2	3	4	5	6	7	8	9	10	Final
Manitoba (Jones)	1	0	1	0	0	1	0	2	0	X	5
British Columbia (Richard) 🔨	0	0	0	1	0	0	1	0	1	X	3

Player percentages
Manitoba		British Columbia	
Dana Malanchuk	76%	Brenda Henderson	80%
Jill Officer	86%	Sandra Stoutenburg	80%
Trisha Baldwin	71%	Tracey Martin	79%
Jennifer Jones	89%	Jeanna Richard	65%
Total	81%	Total	76%

==== Final ====
Sheet D	1	2	3	4	5	6	7	8	9	10	Final
Saskatchewan (Linton) 🔨	1	1	0	2	0	0	1	0	0	0	5
Manitoba (Jones)	0	0	2	0	2	1	0	1	1	1	8

Player percentages
Saskatchewan		Manitoba	
Allison Tanner	70%	Dana Malanchuk	67%
Angela Street	68%	Jill Officer	75%
Cindy Street	84%	Trisha Baldwin	73%
Sherry Linton	65%	Jennifer Jones	80%
Total	72%	Total	74%

== Qualification ==
=== Ontario ===
The Ontario Junior Curling Championships were held in Hawkesbury, Ontario, with the finals held on February 27.

Joe Frans of the Bradford Curling Club won his second straight provincial junior championship, defeating Jeff Steski of Sarnia 7–5 in the men's final. The team went undefeated through the round robin with a 7–0 record, earning a bye to the final. Steski beat Pat Ferris of Peterborough in the semifinal.

Hawkebury's Dominique Lascelles won the women's final, defeating Donna Schell of Cannington 9–3. Lascelles finished with a 6–1 round robing record, earning a bye to the final. Schell beat Julie Anderson of Unionville in a tiebreaker, and then beat Heather Timbers of Oshawa in the semifinal.
