= Kristin Clarke =

Canadian curler (born 1997)

- Curler
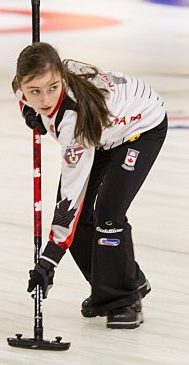
- Born: January 23, 1997 (age 29); Belleville, Ontario

Team
- Curling club: Dartmouth CC, Dartmouth, NS

Curling career
- Hearts: 1 (2020)
- Other appearances: CJCC: 3 (2016, 2017, 2018)
Medal record
Women's Curling
Representing Canada
World Junior Curling Championships
Gold medal – first place	2016 Copenhagen
Gold medal – first place	2018 Aberdeen

Kristin Clarke (born January 23, 1997) is a Canadian curler from Hammonds Plains, Nova Scotia.

== Curling career ==
Clarke skipped the Nova Scotia 2015 NS U18 Women's Championship Team and the NS U21 Mixed Championship Team. She joined Team Fay as third for the 2015/2016 season. Team Fay captured the 2016 Canadian Junior Curling Championships in Stratford, Ontario, and the 2016 World Junior Curling Championships in Tarnby, Denmark. After capturing the World title with Team Fay, Clarke skipped her Dalhousie University team to a fourth place finish at the 2016 CIS National Championship. After Mary Fay retired from curling, Clarke moved to skip with Karlee Burgess at third, Janique Leblanc as second and Ontario import Emily Lloyd as lead for the 2016/17 season. The team won the Nova Scotia U21 Women's Championship and represented the province at the 2017 Canadian Junior Curling Championships in Victoria, B.C. After returning from nationals, Clarke also skipped the Dalhousie University curling team at the 2017 USport Nationals to a fourth place finish in Thunder Bay, Ontario. Clarke played third in the 2017/18 season for Team Jones with Kaitlyn Jones at skip, Karlee Burgess at second and Lindsey Burgess at lead. The team won the 2018 Canadian Junior Curling Championships held in Shawinigan, Quebec and represented Canada at the 2018 World Junior Curling Championship held in Aberdeen, Scotland; where they won gold, defeating defending junior champions, Sweden. Clarke, a two time World Junior champion, will be joining Team Arsenault from NS for the 2018/19 season, her first season in ladies play, as lead joining Jenn Baxter at second, Christina Black at third and Mary-Anne Arsenault at skip.

== Personal life ==
Clarke is currently a law student at Dalhousie University.
