= Harald Ramsfjell =

Norwegian curler

- Curler ♂
- Born: 20 July 1957 (age 69)

Team
- Curling club: Bygdøy CC, Oslo

Curling career
- Member Association: Norway
- World Championship: 1 (1980)
- European Championship: 2 (1978, 1979)
Medal record
Curling
World Championships
Silver medal – second place	1980 Moncton
European Championships
Bronze medal – third place	1979 Varese

Harald Ramsfjell (born 20 July 1957) is a Norwegian curler. He is a 1980 World men's silver medallist.

== Teams ==
Season	Skip	Third	Second	Lead	Events
1978–79	Rolv Kristian Yri	Torger H. Sletten	Harald Ramsfjell	Øystein Skyberg	ECC 1978 (5th)
1979–80	Kristian Sørum	Eigil Ramsfjell	Gunnar Meland	Harald Ramsfjell	ECC 1979 (bronze); WCC 1980 (silver)
