= Emily Lloyd (curler) =

Canadian curler

Emily Lloyd (born 1996) is a Canadian curler from Dundas, Ontario.

Lloyd skipped the McMaster University Varsity Women's Team in 2014–2015, and also played third on Team Kirsten Marshall. The team skipped by Marshall played in the 2016 Pepsi Ontario Junior Curling Championships, held in Mississauga. The team finished with a 6–3 record, losing in the final to Courtney Auld, 7–5. Lloyd joined the Kristin Clarke rink at third in 2016. Clarke was originally the third on the team, but had moved to skip replacing the retired Mary Fay. She played Lead for Team Marshall and the team qualified for the 2018 Ontario Scotties.
