= Paul Gowsell =

Canadian curler

- Curler

Curling career
- Brier: 1 (1980)
Medal record
Men's curling
Representing Canada
World Junior Curling Championships
Gold medal – first place	1976 Aviemore
Gold medal – first place	1978 Grindelwald
Representing Alberta
Labatt Brier
Bronze medal – third place	1980 Calgary

Paul Gowsell is a Canadian curler from Calgary, Alberta. Gowsell hit the men's competitive curling world by storm in the late 1970s with his unorthodox antics.

== Playing career ==
Gowsell was the first skip to win two World Junior Curling Championships. He won his first World Junior championship in 1976, defeating Sweden's Jan Ullsten. He repeated in 1978 by defeating Sweden again, this time skipped by Thomas Håkansson. Gowsell was the third skip to win two Canadian Junior Men's Championships which he did in 1975 and 1978. After juniors, Gowsell was very successful on the cash 'spiel circuit, but played in just one Brier. When he was in his early 20s, Gowsell took his Alberta championship team to an 8-3 record at the 1980 Labatt Brier, and lost to Al Hackner's Northern Ontario team in the semi-final. Gowsell to date has not returned to the Brier, but has played some competitive events since, most recently at the Alberta provincial seniors curling championship in 2010.

On January 5, 2013, Gowsell made a return to men's playdown curling, qualifying for the Alberta Southerns (a qualifier for the Boston Pizza Cup) for the first time in numerous years. He teamed up with former Junior Alberta Provincial Champion, Mike Sali, his son, Sam Gowsell, and young up and coming lead Jamie Cochrane.

== Antics ==
Gowsell was considered the "rebel of the curling world" in the 1970s and early 1980s. According to curler Brent Pierce, "in the '70s, he'd travel in a VW van, partying and drinking beer. And he always wore plaid pants. Rumour has it that he never washed them." In those days, he sported long hair and a beard; Hec Gervais once commented about Gowsell that, "with a shave and two haircuts, he'd be alright."

In a game against Saskatchewan's Larry McGrath, Gowsell was known to have ordered a pizza to the game. Gowsell's team ate the pizza on the ice, and according to legend, McGrath's last stone picked on an olive from the pizza, losing him the game.

Gowsell's teams were also credited with popularizing the use of the "pushbroom" in the sport. His teams revolutionized sweeping techniques in the sport, taking advantage of the chaff left on the ice by most of their competitors who had been using the "Blackjack" style of corn brooms prior to the Gowsell successes at the championship levels.
