= 1980 Air Canada Silver Broom =

- Host city: Moncton, New Brunswick, Canada
- Arena: Moncton Coliseum
- Dates: March 24–29, 1980
- Winner: Canada
- Curling club: Nutana CC; Saskatoon, Saskatchewan
- Skip: Rick Folk
- Third: Ron Mills
- Second: Tom Wilson
- Lead: Jim Wilson
- Finalist: Norway (Kristian Sørum)

The 1980 Air Canada Silver Broom, the men's world curling championship, was held from March 24 to 29 at the Moncton Coliseum in Moncton, New Brunswick, Canada.

== Teams ==
Canada	Denmark	France	Germany	Italy
Nutana CC, Saskatoon, Saskatchewan Skip: Rick Folk; Third: Ron Mills; Second: Tom Wilson; Lead: Jim Wilson	Hvidovre CC, Hvidovre Skip: Jørn Blach; Third: Arne Pedersen; Second: Freddy Bartelsen; Lead: Bent Jørgensen	Bischeim CC, Strassbourg Fourth: René Robert; Third: Jean-Marc Causeret; Second: Claude Groff; Skip: Henri Müller	CC Schwenningen Fourth: Hans Dieter Kiesel; Skip: Franz Engler; Second: Willie Rosenfelder; Lead: Heiner Martin	Tofane CC, Cortina d'Ampezzo Fourth: Andrea Pavani; Skip: Giuseppe Dal Molin; Second: Giancarlo Valt; Lead: Enea Pavani
Norway	Scotland	Sweden	Switzerland	United States
Bygdøy CC, Oslo Skip: Kristian Sørum; Third: Eigil Ramsfjell; Second: Gunnar Meland; Lead: Harald Ramsfjell	Aberdeen CC, Aberdeen Skip: Barton Henderson; Third: Greig Henderson; Second: Bill Henderson; Lead: Alistair Sinclair	Karlstads CK, Karlstad Skip: Ragnar Kamp; Third: Håkan Ståhlbro; Second: Thomas Håkansson; Lead: Lars Lindgren	Lausanne-Riviera CC, Lausanne Skip: Jürg Tanner; Third: Jürg Hornisberger; Second: Franz Tanner; Lead: Patrik Lörtscher	Hibbing CC, Hibbing, Minnesota Skip: Paul Pustovar; Third: John Jankila; Second: Gary Kleffman; Lead: Jerry Scott

== Round-robin standings ==
Country	Skip	W	L
Canada	Rick Folk	9	0
Norway	Kristian Sørum	7	2
Switzerland	Jürg Tanner	7	2
Sweden	Ragnar Kamp	6	3
United States	Paul Pustovar	6	3
Germany	Franz Engler	4	5
Italy	Giuseppe Dal Molin	3	6
Scotland	Barton Henderson	2	7
Denmark	Jørn Blach	1	8
France	Henri Müller	0	9

== Round-robin results ==
=== Draw 1 ===
Team	Final
Italy (Dal Molin)	6
Denmark (Blach)	5

Team	Final
United States (Pustovar)	7
Scotland (B. Henderson)	4

Team	Final
Switzerland (Tanner)	6
Sweden (Kamp)	4

Team	Final
Germany (Engler)	5
France (Müller)	2

Team	Final
Canada (Folk)	7
Norway (Sørum)	2

=== Draw 2 ===
Team	Final
Germany (Engler)	10
Scotland (B. Henderson)	6

Team	Final
Canada (Folk)	7
Switzerland (Tanner)	6

Team	Final
Italy (Dal Molin)	8
France (Müller)	4

Team	Final
Norway (Sørum)	8
United States (Pustovar)	1

Team	Final
Sweden (Kamp)	7
Denmark (Blach)	3

=== Draw 3 ===
Team	Final
United States (Pustovar)	7
Switzerland (Tanner)	1

Team	Final
Sweden (Kamp)	15
France (Müller)	3

Team	Final
Norway (Sørum)	10
Germany (Engler)	4

Team	Final
Canada (Folk)	10
Denmark (Blach)	2

Team	Final
Italy (Dal Molin)	6
Scotland (B. Henderson)	5

=== Draw 4 ===
Team	Final
Norway (Sørum)	10
Sweden (Kamp)	2

Team	Final
Germany (Engler)	5
Denmark (Blach)	4

Team	Final
Canada (Folk)	7
Scotland (B. Henderson)	4

Team	Final
Switzerland (Tanner)	10
Italy (Dal Molin)	3

Team	Final
United States (Pustovar)	8
France (Müller)	3

=== Draw 5 ===
Team	Final
Switzerland (Tanner)	9
France (Müller)	1

Team	Final
Norway (Sørum)	6
Italy (Dal Molin)	4

Team	Final
Sweden (Kamp)	5
United States (Pustovar)	4

Team	Final
Canada (Folk)	10
Germany (Engler)	4

Team	Final
Scotland (B. Henderson)	5
Denmark (Blach)	4

=== Draw 6 ===
Team	Final
Sweden (Kamp)	12
Scotland (B. Henderson)	5

Team	Final
Canada (Folk)	5
United States (Pustovar)	4

Team	Final
Germany (Engler)	12
Italy (Dal Molin)	2

Team	Final
Denmark (Blach)	8
France (Müller)	4

Team	Final
Switzerland (Tanner)	6
Norway (Sørum)	5

=== Draw 7 ===
Team	Final
United States (Pustovar)	8
Germany (Engler)	4

Team	Final
Sweden (Kamp)	6
Italy (Dal Molin)	5

Team	Final
Switzerland (Tanner)	7
Denmark (Blach)	2

Team	Final
Norway (Sørum)	6
Scotland (B. Henderson)	5

Team	Final
Canada (Folk)	9
France (Müller)	3

=== Draw 8 ===
Team	Final
Scotland (B. Henderson)	8
France (Müller)	4

Team	Final
Switzerland (Tanner)	12
Germany (Engler)	2

Team	Final
Canada (Folk)	8
Sweden (Kamp)	6

Team	Final
United States (Pustovar)	8
Italy (Dal Molin)	2

Team	Final
Norway (Sørum)	6
Denmark (Blach)	3

=== Draw 9 ===
Team	Final
Canada (Folk)	4
Italy (Dal Molin)	2

Team	Final
Norway (Sørum)	8
France (Müller)	2

Team	Final
United States (Pustovar)	10
Denmark (Blach)	2

Team	Final
Switzerland (Tanner)	6
Scotland (B. Henderson)	4

Team	Final
Sweden (Kamp)	5
Germany (Engler)	3

== Playoffs ==
Semifinal			Final
			1	Canada	7
2	Switzerland	6	3	Norway	6
3	Norway	9

=== Semifinal ===
Team	Final
Norway (Sørum)	9
Switzerland (Tanner)	6

=== Final ===
Team	Final
Canada (Folk)	7
Norway (Sørum)	6

1980 Air Canada Silver Broom
(Canada)
Canada
13th title
