= Canadian Junior Curling Championships =

Annual youth curling tournament

- Established: 1950 (men); 1971 (women)
- 2026 host city: Sudbury, Ontario
- 2026 arena: Gerry McCrory Countryside Sports Complex

Current champions (2026)
- Men: Ontario 1
- Women: Quebec 2

Current edition
- 2026 Canadian Junior Curling Championships

The Canadian Under-20 Curling Championships, more commonly known as the Canadian Junior Curling Championships, is an annual curling tournament held to determine the best youth curling team in Canada. Junior level curlers must be under the age of 21 as of June 30 in the year prior to the tournament.

The event began in 1950 as the National Schoolboys Championship, and all members of a team had to attend the same high school. Efforts to establish the event were led by Ken Watson, Maurice Smith and others. From 1950 to 1957, teams played for the Victor Sifton Trophy. Sifton's newspaper chain was the sponsor of the event during this time. From 1958 to 1975 the event was sponsored by Pepsi and was known as the Pepsi Schoolboys, becoming the Pepsi Juniors in 1976. At that time, the age limit of the event was adjusted to match the eligibility for the World Junior Curling Championships which began in 1975. In 1971 a separate women's event was created, and was initially called the Canadian Girls Curling Championship. In 1980 Pepsi began sponsoring the women's juniors as well. In 1987 the events were combined into one national junior championship and held at the same venue. Pepsi continued to be the event sponsor until 1994. In 1995, the event was added to the Canadian Curling Association's "Season of Champions" programme.

Since 2022 and between 1974 and 1994, the winner of the event went on to represent Canada at the following year's World junior championship. 1996 to 2020 the winner would play in the same year's championship. The winners of the 1994 and 1995 women's events had to play off to represent Canada at the 1995 World Junior Curling Championships. This was not needed for the men, as the 1993 champion Shawn Adams rink was suspended, so the 1994 winners represented Canada at the 1994 World Junior Curling Championships. The 2021 event was cancelled due to the COVID-19 pandemic, and was replaced by the 2021 World Junior Qualification Event played in the Fall, the winner going on to represent Canada at the 2022 World Juniors.

The event was re-branded to the Canadian Under-21 Curling Championships in 2024 and the Canadian Under-20 Curling Championships in 2025.

== Sponsors ==
- 1950–1957: Sifton newspapers
- 1958–1994: Pepsi
- 1995: Canadian Curling Association
- 1996–1997: Maple Leaf Foods
- 1998–2005: Kärcher
- 2006–2015: M&M Meat Shops
- 2016: Egg Farmers of Ontario
- 2017: Ambrosia
- 2018–current: New Holland

== Champions ==
=== Men ===
==== 1950–1978 ====
Year	Winning Locale	Winning team	Coach	Location
1950	Saskatchewan	Bill Clarke, Gary Carlson, Ian Innes, Harold Grassie		Quebec City, Quebec
1951	Saskatchewan	Gary Thode, Gary Cooper, Orest Hyrniuk, Roy Hufsmith		Nelson, British Columbia
1952	Saskatchewan	Gary Thode, Gary Cooper, Doug Conn, Roy Hufsmith		Moncton, New Brunswick
1953	Ontario	Bob Walker, Duncan Brodie, Claire Peacock, George MacGregor		Saskatoon, Saskatchewan
1954	Saskatchewan	Bayne Secord, Don Snider, Stan Austman, Don Brownell		Hamilton, Ontario
1955	Saskatchewan	Bayne Secord, Stan Austman, Merv Mann, Gary Stevenson		Sydney, Nova Scotia
1956	Saskatchewan	Bob Hawkins, Ted Clarke, Bruce Beveridge, Dave Williams		Fort William, Ontario
1957	Ontario	Ian Johnston, Peter Galsworthy, Dave Robinson, Mike Jackson		Winnipeg, Manitoba
1958	Northern Ontario	Tom Tod, Neil McLeod, Patrick Moran, David Allin		Charlottetown, Prince Edward Island
1959	Alberta	John Trout, Bruce Walker, David Woods, Allen Sharpe	George Walsh	Calgary, Alberta
1960	Alberta	Tommy Kroeger, Jack Isaman, Ron Nelson, Murray Sorenson		Noranda, Quebec
1961	British Columbia	Jerry Caughlin, Jack Cox, Mike Shippitt, David Jones		Prince George, British Columbia
1962	Saskatchewan	Mike Lukowich, Ed Lukowich, Doug McLeod, David Moore		Halifax, Nova Scotia
1963	Alberta	Wayne Saboe, Ron Hampton, Rick Aldridge, Mick Adams		Guelph, Ontario
1964	Northern Ontario	Bob Ash, Bill Ash, Terry Armstrong, Fred Prier	Bill Prokopich	Regina, Saskatchewan
1965	Saskatchewan	Dan Fink, Ken Runtz, Ron Jacques, Larry Lechner		Fredericton, New Brunswick
1966	Alberta	Brian Howes, Blair Pallesen, John Thompson, Chris Robinson		St. John's, Newfoundland
1967	Alberta	Stanley Trout, Doug Dobry, Allen Kullay, Donald Douglas	Ron Anton	Flin Flon, Manitoba
1968	Ontario	Bill Hope, Bruce Lord, Brian Domney, Dennis Gardiner		Port Arthur, Ontario
1969	Saskatchewan	Robert Miller, Roger Rask, Lloyd Helm, William Aug		North Battleford, Saskatchewan
1970	New Brunswick	Ronald Ferguson, Garth Jardine, Brian Henderson, Cyril Sutherland		Saint-Jérôme, Quebec
1971	Saskatchewan	Greg Montgomery, Don Despins, Jeff Montgomery, Rod Verboom		Kamloops, British Columbia
1972	Alberta	Lawrence Niven, Rick Niven, Jim Ross, Ted Poblawski		Schumacher, Ontario
1973	Ontario	Mark McDonald, Lloyd Emmerson, Phillip Tomsett, Jon Clare		Moncton, New Brunswick
1974	Alberta	Robb King, Brad Hannah, Bill Fowlis, Chris King		Ottawa, Ontario
1975	Alberta	Paul Gowsell, Neil Houston, Glen Jackson, Kelly Stearne		Edmonton, Alberta
1976	Prince Edward Island	Bill Jenkins, John Scales, Sandy Stewart, Alan Mayhew	Doug Cameron	Kapuskasing, Ontario
1977	Alberta	Paul Gowsell, John Ferguson, Doug MacFarlane, Kelly Stearne		Winnipeg, Manitoba
1978	Alberta	Darren Fish, Lorne Barker, Murray Ursulak, Barry Barker		Charlottetown, Prince Edward Island

==== 1979–present ====
A playoff was added in 1979.

Year	Winning Locale	Winning team	Coach	Runner-up Locale (skip)	Location
1979	Manitoba	Mert Thompsett, Lyle Derry, Joel Gagne, Mike Friesen		Newfoundland (Geoff Cunningham)	Victoria, British Columbia
1980	Quebec	Denis Marchand, Denis Cecil, Yves Barrette, Larry Phillips	André Ferland	Ontario (John Kawaja)	Sault Ste. Marie, Ontario
1981	Manitoba	Mert Thompsett, Bill McTavish, Joel Gagne, Mike Friesen		Northwest Territories (Trevor Alexander)	Saint John, New Brunswick
1982	Ontario	John Base, Bruce Webster, Dave McAnerney, Jim Donahoe	Rick Base	British Columbia (Todd Gray)	Swift Current, Saskatchewan
1983	Saskatchewan	Jamie Schneider, Danny Ferner, Steven Leippi, Kelly Vollman	Mike Schneider	Newfoundland (Frank O'Driscoll)	Halifax, Nova Scotia
1984	Manitoba	Bob Ursel, Brent Mendella, Gerald Chick, Mike Ursel	Jim Ursel	British Columbia (Rob Houston)	Winnipeg, Manitoba
1985	Alberta	Kevin Martin, Richard Feeney, Dan Petryk, Michael Berger		Prince Edward Island (Kent Scales)	St. John's, Newfoundland
1986	Manitoba	Hugh McFadyen, Jon Mead, Norman Gould, John Lange		Saskatchewan (Kelly Vollman)	Red Deer, Alberta
1987	New Brunswick	Jim Sullivan, Charlie Sullivan, Craig Burgess, Dan Alderman	David Sullivan	Ontario (Wayne Middaugh)	Prince Albert, Saskatchewan
1988	British Columbia	Mike Wood, Mike Bradley, Todd Troyer, Greg Hawkes	Gordon Hooey	Northern Ontario (Craig Kochan)	North Vancouver, British Columbia
1989	British Columbia	Dean Joanisse, David Nantes, Tim Coombes, Jet Pilon	Dave Hatter	Quebec (Martin Ferland)	Winnipeg, Manitoba
1990	Ontario	Noel Herron, Robert Brewer, Steve Small, Richard Polk	Ted Brown	Manitoba (Lyall Hudson)	Garson, Ontario
1991	Northern Ontario	Jason Repay, Aaron Skillen, Scott McCallum, Trevor Clifford	Jim Glena	Alberta (Rob Schlender)	Leduc, Alberta
1992	Quebec	Michel Ferland, Marco Berthelot, Steve Beaudry, Steve Guetre	André Ferland	Nova Scotia (Shawn Adams)	Vernon, British Columbia
1993	Nova Scotia	Shawn Adams, Ben Blanchard, Jon Philip, Robert MacArthur	Neil Powers	Saskatchewan (Jeff Wall)	Trois-Rivières, Quebec
1994	Alberta	Colin Davison, Kelly Mittelstadt, Scott Pfeifer, Sean Morris	Darryl Horn	Northwest Territories/Yukon (Kevin Koe)	Truro, Nova Scotia
1995	Manitoba	Chris Galbraith, Scott Cripps, Brent Barrett, Bryan Galbraith	Arnold Asham	New Brunswick (James Grattan)	Regina, Saskatchewan
1996	Northern Ontario	Jeff Currie, Greg Given, Andrew Mikkelsen, Tyler Oinonen	Don Main	Northern Ontario (Jeff Currie)	Edmonton, Alberta
1997	Alberta	Ryan Keane, Scott Pfeifer, Blayne Iskiw, Peter Heck	Pat Keane	Ontario (John Morris)	Selkirk, Manitoba
1998	Ontario	John Morris, Craig Savill, Andy Ormsby, Brent Laing	Brian Savill & Earle Morris	Alberta (Carter Rycroft)	Calgary, Alberta
1999	Ontario	John Morris, Craig Savill, Jason Young, Brent Laing	Scott Taylor	British Columbia (Jeff Richard)	Kelowna, British Columbia
2000	British Columbia	Brad Kuhn, Kevin Folk, Ryan Kuhn, Hugh Bennett	Jock Tyre	Newfoundland (Brad Gushue)	Moncton, New Brunswick
2001	Newfoundland	Brad Gushue, Mark Nichols, Brent Hamilton, Mike Adam	Jeff Thomas	Manitoba (Mike McEwen)	St. Catharines, Ontario
2002	Manitoba	David Hamblin, Ross Derksen, Kevin Hamblin, Ross McCannell	Lorne Hamblin	Quebec (Martin Crête)	Summerside, Prince Edward Island
2003	Saskatchewan	Steve Laycock, Chris Haichert, Mike Jantzen, Kyler Broad	Barry Fiendel	Alberta (Darren Moulding)	Ottawa, Ontario
2004	New Brunswick	Ryan Sherrard, Jason Roach, Darren Roach, Jared Bezanson	Robert Sherrard	Newfoundland and Labrador (Matthew Blandford)	Victoria, British Columbia
2005	Saskatchewan	Kyle George, Justin Mihalicz, D. J. Kidby, Chris Hebert	Dwayne Mihalicz	Ontario (Mark Bice)	Fredericton, New Brunswick
2006	Alberta	Charley Thomas, Geoff Walker, Rollie Robinson, Kyle Reynolds	Alan Walker	British Columbia (Ty Griffith)	Thunder Bay, Ontario
2007	Alberta	Charley Thomas, Brock Virtue, Matthew Ng, Kyle Reynolds	J. D. Lind	Prince Edward Island (Brett Gallant)	St. Catharines, Ontario
2008	Quebec	William Dion, Jean-Michel Arsenault, Erik Lachance, Miguel Bernard	Benoit Arsenault	Ontario (Travis Fanset)	Sault Ste. Marie, Ontario
2009	Prince Edward Island	Brett Gallant, Adam Casey, Anson Carmody, Jamie Danbrook	Peter Gallant	Northern Ontario (Dylan Johnston)	Salmon Arm, British Columbia
2010	Ontario	Jake Walker, Craig Van Ymeren, Geoff Chambers, Matthew Mapletoft	John Thompson	Manitoba (Alex Forrest)	Sorel-Tracy, Quebec
2011	Saskatchewan	Braeden Moskowy, Kirk Muyres, Colton Flasch, Matt Lang	Dwayne Mihalicz	Ontario (Mat Camm)	Calgary, Alberta
2012	Alberta	Brendan Bottcher, Evan Asmussen, Landon Bucholz, Bryce Bucholz	Bernie Panich	Northern Ontario (Brennan Wark)	Napanee, Ontario
2013	Manitoba	Matt Dunstone, Colton Lott, Daniel Grant, Brendan MacCuish	Scott Grant	Alberta (Thomas Scoffin)	Fort McMurray, Alberta
2014	Manitoba	Braden Calvert, Kyle Kurz, Lucas Van Den Bosch, Brendan Wilson	Tom Clasper	New Brunswick (Rene Comeau)	Liverpool, Nova Scotia
2015	Manitoba	Braden Calvert, Kyle Kurz, Lucas Van Den Bosch, Brendan Wilson	Tom Clasper	Saskatchewan (Jacob Hersikorn)	Corner Brook, Newfoundland and Labrador
2016	Manitoba	Matt Dunstone, Colton Lott, Kyle Doering, Robbie Gordon	Calvin Edie	Northern Ontario (Tanner Horgan)	Stratford, Ontario
2017	British Columbia	Tyler Tardi, Sterling Middleton, Jordan Tardi, Nick Meister	Paul Tardi	Ontario (Matthew Hall)	Esquimalt, British Columbia
2018	British Columbia	Tyler Tardi, Sterling Middleton, Jordan Tardi, Zachary Curtis	Paul Tardi	Northern Ontario (Tanner Horgan)	Shawinigan, Quebec
2019	British Columbia	Tyler Tardi, Sterling Middleton, Matthew Hall, Alex Horvath	Paul Tardi	Manitoba (J.T. Ryan)	Prince Albert, Saskatchewan
2020	Manitoba 2	Jacques Gauthier, Jordan Peters, Brayden Payette, Zack Bilawka	John Lund	Newfoundland and Labrador (Daniel Bruce)	Langley, British Columbia
2021	Cancelled due to the COVID-19 pandemic in Canada. Replaced by the 2021 World Junior Qualification Event				Fort McMurray, Alberta
2022	Ontario 1	Landan Rooney, Nathan Steele, Jacob Jones, Austin Snyder	Collin Mitchell	Alberta 1 (Johnson Tao)	Stratford, Ontario
2023	Alberta 2	Johnson Tao, Jaedon Neuert, Benjamin Morin, Adam Naugler	Skip Wilson	Northern Ontario (Dallas Burgess)	Rouyn-Noranda, Quebec
2024	Alberta 1	Kenan Wipf, Ky Macaulay, Michael Keenan, Max Cinnamon	Derek Bowyer	Nova Scotia (Calan MacIsaac)	Fort McMurray, Alberta
2025	Nova Scotia 2	Calan MacIsaac, Nathan Gray, Owain Fisher, Christopher McCurdy	Craig Burgess	New Brunswick (Rajan Dalrymple)	Summerside, Prince Edward Island
2026	Ontario 1	Evan MacDougall, Dylan Stockton, Evan Madore, Carson Kay	Jordan Thin	Alberta 1 (Peter Hlushak)	Sudbury, Ontario

=== Women ===
==== 1971–1982 ====
Year	Winning Locale	Winning team	Coach	Location
1971	Alberta	Shelby McKenzie, Marlene Pargeter, Arlene Hrdlicka, Debbie Goliss		Vancouver, British Columbia
1972	Manitoba	Chris Pidzarko, Cathy Pidzarko, Beth Brunsdon, Barbara Rudolph		Winnipeg, Manitoba
1973	Saskatchewan	Janet Crimp, Carol Davis, Chris Gervais, Susan Carney		Montreal, Quebec
1974	Manitoba	Chris Pidzarko, Cathy Pidzarko, Patti Vandekerckhove, Barbara Rudolph		Edmonton, Alberta
1975	Saskatchewan	Patricia Crimp, Colleen Rudd, Judy Sefton, Merrill Greabeiel		Grand Falls, Newfoundland
1976	Saskatchewan	Colleen Rudd, Carol Rudd, Julie Burke, Lori Glenn		Thunder Bay, Ontario
1977	Alberta	Cathy King, Robin Ursuliak, Maureen Olsen, Mary Kay James		Saint John, New Brunswick
1978	Alberta	Cathy King, Brenda Oko, Maureen Olsen, Diane Bowes		Chilliwack, British Columbia
1979	Saskatchewan	Denise Wilson, Judy Walker, Dianne Choquette, Shannon Olafson		Yorkton, Saskatchewan
1980	Nova Scotia	Kay Smith, Krista Gatchell, Cathy Caudle, Peggy Wilson	Bill Gatchell	Charlottetown, Prince Edward Island
1981	Manitoba	Karen Fallis, Karen Tresoor, Caroline Hunter, Lynn Fallis		Dartmouth, Nova Scotia
1982	British Columbia	Sandra Plut, Sandra Rainey, Leigh Fraser, Debra Fowles	Bob Holden	Winnipeg, Manitoba

==== 1983–present ====
A playoff was added in 1983.

Year	Winning Locale	Winning team	Coach	Runner-up Locale (skip)	Location
1983	Ontario	Alison Goring, Kristin Holman, Cheryl McPherson, Lynda Armstrong	Keith Reilly	Quebec (Debbie Wark)	Calgary, Alberta
1984	Manitoba	Darcy Kirkness, Barb Kirkness, Janet Harvey, Barbara Fetch	Jim Kirkness	Ontario (Kristin Holman)	Fort St. John, British Columbia
1985	Saskatchewan	Kimberley Armbruster, Sheila Calcutt, Wanda Figitt, Lorraine Krupski	Ronda Wood	British Columbia (Georgina Hawkes)	Fredericton, New Brunswick
1986	British Columbia	Jodie Sutton, Julie Sutton, Dawn Rubner, Chris Thompson		Newfoundland (Jill Noseworthy)	Noranda, Quebec
1987	British Columbia	Julie Sutton, Judy Wood, Susan Auty, Marla Geiger	Gary DeBlonde	Manitoba (Karen Purdy)	Prince Albert, Saskatchewan
1988	Alberta	LaDawn Funk, Sandy Symyrozum, Cindy Larsen, Laurelle Funk		Manitoba (Jennifer Lamont)	North Vancouver, British Columbia
1989	Manitoba	Cathy Overton, Tracy Baldwin, Carol Harvey, Tracy Bush		British Columbia (Judy Wood	Winnipeg, Manitoba
1990	Saskatchewan	Atina Ford, Darlene Kidd, Leslie Beck, Cindy Ford	Harvey Forner	Manitoba (Nancy Malanchuk)	Garson, Ontario
1991	New Brunswick	Heather Smith, Denise Cormier, Susanne LeBlanc, Lesley Hicks		Manitoba (Jill Staub)	Leduc, Alberta
1992	Saskatchewan	Amber Holland, Cindy Street, Tracy Beach, Angela Street		Northern Ontario (Tara Coulterman)	Vernon, British Columbia
1993	Ontario	Kim Gellard, Corie Beveridge, Lisa Savage, Sandy Graham		Quebec (Janique Berthelot)	Trois-Rivières, Quebec
1994	Manitoba	Jennifer Jones, Trisha Baldwin, Jill Officer, Dana Malanchuk	Nancy Malanchuk	Saskatchewan (Sherry Linton)	Truro, Nova Scotia
1995	Manitoba	Kelly MacKenzie, Joanne Fillion, Carlene Muth, Sasha Bergner	Bill MacKenzie	Ontario (Kirsten Harmark)	Regina, Saskatchewan
1996	Alberta	Heather Godberson, Carmen Whyte, Kristie Moore, Terelyn Bloor	Brian Moore	Saskatchewan (Cindy Street)	Edmonton, Alberta
1997	Nova Scotia	Meredith Doyle, Beth Roach, Tara Hamer, Candice MacLean	Jim Burgess	Quebec (Marie-France Larouche)	Selkirk, Manitoba
1998	New Brunswick	Melissa McClure, Nancy Toner, Brigitte McClure, Bethany Toner	Lee Toner	Ontario (Jenn Hanna)	Calgary, Alberta
1999	Quebec	Marie-France Larouche, Nancy Bélanger, Marie-Ève Létourneau, Valerie Grenier	Camil Larouche	Nova Scotia (Meredith Doyle)	Kelowna, British Columbia
2000	Saskatchewan	Stefanie Miller, Marliese Miller, Stacy Helm, Amanda MacDonald	Bob Miller	Prince Edward Island (Suzanne Gaudet)	Moncton, New Brunswick
2001	Prince Edward Island	Suzanne Gaudet, Stefanie Richard, Robyn MacPhee, Kelly Higgins	Paul Power	Saskatchewan (Stefanie Miller)	St. Catharines, Ontario
2002	Prince Edward Island	Suzanne Gaudet, Robyn MacPhee, Carol Webb, Kelly Higgins	Paul Power	Newfoundland and Labrador (Jennifer Guzzwell)	Summerside, Prince Edward Island
2003	Saskatchewan	Marliese Miller, Teejay Surik, Janelle Lemon, Chelsey Bell	Bob Miller	Nova Scotia (Robyn Mattie)	Ottawa, Ontario
2004	Nova Scotia	Jill Mouzar, Paige Mattie, Blisse Comstock, Chloe Comstock	Donalda Mattie	Quebec (Marie Cantin)	Victoria, British Columbia
2005	New Brunswick	Andrea Kelly, Kristen MacDiarmid, Jodie de Solla, Lianne Sobey	Paul Green	Alberta (Desirée Robertson)	Fredericton, New Brunswick
2006	Saskatchewan	Mandy Selzer, Erin Selzer, Kristen Mitchell, Megan Selzer	Ken Bakken	Manitoba (Calleen Neufeld)	Thunder Bay, Ontario
2007	Newfoundland and Labrador	Stacie Devereaux, Stephanie Guzzwell, Sarah Paul, Julie Devereaux	Diane Ryan	Manitoba (Calleen Neufeld)	St. Catharines, Ontario
2008	Manitoba	Kaitlyn Lawes, Jenna Loder, Liz Peters, Sarah Wazney	Alex Mowat	Saskatchewan (Stephanie McVicar)	Sault Ste. Marie, Ontario
2009	Manitoba	Kaitlyn Lawes, Jenna Loder, Laryssa Grenkow, Breanne Meakin	Rob Meakin	Ontario (Rachel Homan)	Salmon Arm, British Columbia
2010	Ontario	Rachel Homan, Emma Miskew, Laura Crocker, Lynn Kreviazuk	Earle Morris	British Columbia (Sailene Sivertson)	Sorel-Tracy, Quebec
2011	Saskatchewan	Trish Paulsen, Kari Kennedy, Kari Paulsen, Natalie Yanko	Bob Miller	Alberta (Nadine Chyz)	Calgary, Alberta
2012	Alberta	Jocelyn Peterman, Brittany Tran, Rebecca Konschuh, Kristine Anderson	Nancy McInerney	Manitoba (Shannon Birchard)	Napanee, Ontario
2013	British Columbia	Corryn Brown, Erin Pincott, Samantha Fisher, Sydney Fraser	Ken Brown	Manitoba (Shannon Birchard)	Fort McMurray, Alberta
2014	Alberta	Kelsey Rocque, Keely Brown, Taylor McDonald, Claire Tully	Amanda Dawn Coderre	British Columbia (Kalia Van Osch)	Liverpool, Nova Scotia
2015	Alberta	Kelsey Rocque, Danielle Schmiemann, Holly Jamieson, Jessica Iles	Amanda Dawn Coderre	Ontario (Chelsea Brandwood)	Corner Brook, Newfoundland and Labrador
2016	Nova Scotia	Mary Fay, Kristin Clarke, Karlee Burgess, Janique LeBlanc	Andrew Atherton	British Columbia (Sarah Daniels)	Stratford, Ontario
2017	Alberta	Kristen Streifel, Chantele Broderson, Kate Goodhelpsen, Brenna Bilassy	Amanda St-Laurent	Ontario (Hailey Armstrong)	Esquimalt, British Columbia
2018	Nova Scotia	Kaitlyn Jones, Kristin Clarke, Karlee Burgess, Lindsey Burgess	Andrew Atherton	Quebec (Laurie St-Georges)	Shawinigan, Quebec
2019	Alberta	Selena Sturmay, Abby Marks, Kate Goodhelpsen, Paige Papley	Amanda St-Laurent	British Columbia (Sarah Daniels)	Prince Albert, Saskatchewan
2020	Manitoba	Mackenzie Zacharias, Karlee Burgess, Emily Zacharias, Lauren Lenentine	Sheldon Zacharias	Alberta (Abby Marks)	Langley, British Columbia
2021	Cancelled due to the COVID-19 pandemic in Canada. Replaced by the 2021 World Junior Qualification Event				Fort McMurray, Alberta
2022	Nova Scotia 1	Taylour Stevens, Lauren Ferguson, Alison Umlah, Cate Fitzgerald	Mary Mattatall	Ontario 1 (Emily Deschenes)	Stratford, Ontario
2023	Alberta 1	Myla Plett, Alyssa Nedohin, Chloe Fediuk, Allie Iskiw	Blair Lenton	Newfoundland and Labrador (Mackenzie Mitchell)	Rouyn-Noranda, Quebec
2024	Nova Scotia 1	Allyson MacNutt, Maria Fitzgerald, Alison Umlah, Grace McCusker	Theresa Breen	Ontario 1 (Julia Markle)	Fort McMurray, Alberta
2025	Alberta 1	Myla Plett, Alyssa Nedohin, Chloe Fediuk, Allie Iskiw	David Nedohin	Quebec 1 (Jolianne Fortin)	Summerside, Prince Edward Island
2026	Quebec 2	Jolianne Fortin, Emy Lafrance, Megan Lafrance, Mégane Fortin	Brandon Lafrance	Manitoba (Shaela Hayward)	Sudbury, Ontario

== Titles by Province/Territory ==
As of 2026

Men

Province/Territory	Titles
Alberta (Note: Includes Alberta 2 team.)	18
Saskatchewan	14
Manitoba (Note: Includes Manitoba 2 team.)	11
Ontario	11
British Columbia	7
Northern Ontario	4
New Brunswick	3
Quebec	3
Nova Scotia (Note: Includes Nova Scotia 2 team.)	2
Prince Edward Island	2
Newfoundland and Labrador	1
Northwest Territories	0
Nunavut	0
Yukon	0

Women

Province/Territory	Titles
Alberta	12
Saskatchewan	11
Manitoba	10
Nova Scotia	7
British Columbia	4
New Brunswick	3
Ontario	3
Prince Edward Island	2
Quebec (Note: Includes Quebec 2 team.)	2
Newfoundland and Labrador	1
Northern Ontario	0
Northwest Territories	0
Nunavut	0
Yukon	0

Overall

Province/Territory	Titles
Alberta	30
Saskatchewan	25
Manitoba	21
Ontario	14
British Columbia	11
Nova Scotia	9
New Brunswick	6
Quebec	5
Northern Ontario	4
Prince Edward Island	4
Newfoundland and Labrador	2
Northwest Territories	0
Nunavut	0
Yukon	0
