= 2002 Canadian Junior Curling Championships =

2002 Canadian Junior Curling: Summerside, Canada

2002 Kärcher Canadian Junior Curling Championships
- Host city: Summerside, Prince Edward Island
- Arena: Silver Fox Curling and Yacht Club & Cahill Stadium
- Dates: January 19–27
- Men's winner: Manitoba
- Curling club: Pembina CC, Winnipeg
- Skip: David Hamblin
- Third: Ross Derksen
- Second: Kevin Hamblin
- Lead: Ross McCannell
- Coach: Lorne Hamblin
- Finalist: Quebec (Crête)
- Women's winner: Prince Edward Island
- Curling club: Silver Fox C&YC, Summerside
- Skip: Suzanne Gaudet
- Third: Robyn MacPhee
- Second: Carol Webb
- Lead: Kelly Higgins
- Coach: Paul Power
- Finalist: Newfoundland and Labrador (Guzzwell)

The 2002 Kärcher Canadian Junior Curling Championships were held January 19–27 at the Silver Fox Curling and Yacht Club and at Cahill Stadium in Summerside, Prince Edward Island. The winning teams represented Canada at the 2002 World Junior Curling Championships.

Manitoba, skipped by David Hamblin won the men's final, defeating Quebec's Martin Crête rink 5–4 in the final. Manitoba took a stranglehold of the game, going up 5–1 after eight after three straight stolen ends. While Quebec scored a deuce in the ninth, they needed to steal two in the tenth to tie. Quebec was sitting the two they needed after Crête threw his last rock, but Hamblin peeled one out to win the game. It was Manitoba's sixth junior men's championship, and the first since 1995.

Prince Edward Island, skipped by Suzanne Gaudet won the women's final, defeating Newfoundland and Labrador's Jennifer Guzzwell rink 6–4 in the final. The team claimed victory when Guzzwell missed a hit and stick attempt with her last shot of the game, giving PEI a steal of one. Team PEI, who hailed from the local Silver Fox club won the game in front of 2,200 fans at Summerside's Cahill Stadium. It was the second straight junior championship for Gaudet, who became the first skip since Cathy King in 1977 and 1978 to win two straight junior women's championships. Gaudet, who was in her last year of junior eligibility, finished the tournament with a career 49 victories, setting a record.

Hamblin went on to win a gold medal at the 2002 World Juniors, while Gaudet and her rink won bronze.

== Men's ==
=== Teams ===
Province / Territory	Skip	Third	Second	Lead	Club
Alberta	Justin Jacobsen	Adam Enright	Regan Braseth	Matthew Enright	Rose City CC, Camrose
British Columbia	Ryan Kuhn	Cameron Watt	Ty Griffith	Steve Bauer	Kelowna CC, Kelowna
Manitoba	David Hamblin	Ross Derksen	Kevin Hamblin	Ross McCannell	Pembina CC, Winnipeg
New Brunswick	Jamie Murphy	Blake Kelly	Ryan Porter	Luke Johnson	Riverside CC, Saint John
Newfoundland and Labrador	Ryan LeDrew	Mike Adam	Brent Hamilton	Nick Lane	St. John's CC, St. John's
Northern Ontario	Brian Adams	Ben Mikkelsen	Colin Koivula	Justin McCarville	Port Arthur CC, Thunder Bay
Northwest Territories	Trevor Moss	Chris Kelln	Robert Borden	Alan Wedel	Yellowknife CC, Yellowknife
Nova Scotia	Kevin Saccary	Corey Shortliffe	Scott Saccarey	Donald Brooks	Mayflower CC, Halifax
Ontario	Jeff Armstrong	Codey Maus	Derek Abbotts	Mark Gamble	Blue Water CC, Owen Sound
Prince Edward Island	Mark Waugh	Steven vanOuwerkerk	Daniel Richard	Jeremy Cameron	Silver Fox C&YC, Summerside
Quebec	Martin Crete	Jonathan Tremblay	Kevin White	Olivier Leclerc	CC Jacques-Cartier, Sillery & CC Victoria, Sainte-Foy
Saskatchewan	Kyle George	Ben Hebert	Todd Montgomery	Dustin Kidby	Wheat City CC, Regina
Yukon	Kyle Gee	James Babcock	Calvin Kirkwood	Alexander Peech	Whitehorse CC, Whitehorse

=== Standings ===
Locale	Skip	W	L
Quebec	Martin Crete	10	2
Manitoba	David Hamblin	9	3
Northern Ontario	Brian Adams	9	3
British Columbia	Ryan Kuhn	8	4
Saskatchewan	Kyle George	7	5
New Brunswick	Jamie Murphy	7	5
Nova Scotia	Kevin Saccary	6	6
Prince Edward Island	Mark Waugh	6	6
Alberta	Justin Jacobsen	6	6
Ontario	Jeff Armstrong	5	7
Newfoundland and Labrador	Ryan LeDrew	4	8
Northwest Territories	Trevor Moss	1	11
Yukon	Kyle Gee	0	12

=== Results ===
==== Draw 1 ====
Sheet A	1	2	3	4	5	6	7	8	9	10	Final
Alberta (Jacobsen)	0	2	0	0	3	0	0	1	1	X	7
New Brunswick (Murphy)	0	0	2	1	0	0	1	0	0	X	4

Sheet C	1	2	3	4	5	6	7	8	9	10	Final
Newfoundland and Labrador (LeDrew)	0	0	0	0	1	0	0	0	X	X	1
Prince Edward Island (Waugh)	0	0	1	3	0	0	2	1	X	X	7

Sheet G	1	2	3	4	5	6	7	8	9	10	Final
Ontario (Armstrong)	0	1	1	0	0	2	0	0	X	X	4
Saskatchewan (George)	1	0	0	2	1	0	4	2	X	X	10

Sheet I	1	2	3	4	5	6	7	8	9	10	Final
Nova Scotia (Saccary)	0	1	0	0	1	0	0	0	2	X	4
British Columbia (Kuhn)	0	0	2	2	0	0	2	1	0	X	7

==== Draw 2 ====
Sheet B	1	2	3	4	5	6	7	8	9	10	Final
Yukon (Gee)	0	1	1	1	0	0	1	2	0	0	6
Quebec (Crete)	2	0	0	0	1	1	0	0	2	1	7

Sheet C	1	2	3	4	5	6	7	8	9	10	Final
Northwest Territories (Moss)	2	1	0	0	0	1	0	0	1	X	5
Ontario (Armstrong)	0	0	2	3	2	0	1	1	0	X	9

Sheet F	1	2	3	4	5	6	7	8	9	10	Final
Northern Ontario (Adams)	2	0	1	0	0	2	0	3	0	0	8
Nova Scotia (Saccary)	0	2	0	0	2	0	2	0	2	1	9

Sheet I	1	2	3	4	5	6	7	8	9	10	Final
Manitoba (Hamblin)	1	0	2	0	0	0	2	0	3	X	8
Alberta (Jacobsen)	0	1	0	0	1	0	0	1	0	X	3

==== Draw 3 ====
Sheet B	1	2	3	4	5	6	7	8	9	10	Final
British Columbia (Kuhn)	0	1	0	1	0	0	0	1	1	X	4
Newfoundland and Labrador (LeDrew)	2	0	2	0	0	0	2	0	0	X	6

Sheet C	1	2	3	4	5	6	7	8	9	10	Final
Quebec (Crete)	4	0	0	2	1	0	0	1	0	2	10
Manitoba (Hamblin)	0	0	2	0	0	3	1	0	0	0	6

Sheet E	1	2	3	4	5	6	7	8	9	10	Final
New Brunswick (Murphy)	0	2	0	0	0	0	1	2	3	X	8
Northwest Territories (Moss)	0	0	1	1	1	1	0	0	0	X	4

Sheet H	1	2	3	4	5	6	7	8	9	10	Final
Prince Edward Island (Waugh)	2	1	1	1	0	2	0	X	X	X	7
Yukon (Gee)	0	0	0	0	1	0	1	X	X	X	2

Sheet J	1	2	3	4	5	6	7	8	9	10	Final
Saskatchewan (George)	0	1	1	0	1	0	0	2	0	X	5
Northern Ontario (Adams)	1	0	0	2	0	2	1	0	4	X	10

==== Draw 4 ====
Sheet A	1	2	3	4	5	6	7	8	9	10	Final
Northern Ontario (Adams)	2	0	1	0	3	1	0	0	1	X	8
British Columbia (Kuhn)	0	0	0	1	0	0	0	3	0	X	4

Sheet D	1	2	3	4	5	6	7	8	9	10	Final
New Brunswick (Murphy)	1	0	0	0	2	0	0	2	1	X	6
Ontario (Armstrong)	0	1	0	1	0	1	0	0	0	X	3

Sheet H	1	2	3	4	5	6	7	8	9	10	Final
Saskatchewan (George)	0	2	1	1	1	5	X	X	X	X	10
Nova Scotia (Saccary)	1	0	0	0	0	0	X	X	X	X	1

Sheet I	1	2	3	4	5	6	7	8	9	10	Final
Quebec (Crete)	1	0	0	2	1	0	1	1	1	X	7
Alberta (Jacobsen)	0	0	2	0	0	2	0	0	0	X	4

==== Draw 5 ====
Sheet A	1	2	3	4	5	6	7	8	9	10	Final
Nova Scotia (Saccary)	5	1	2	0	0	0	0	3	X	X	11
Newfoundland and Labrador (LeDrew)	0	0	0	1	1	1	1	0	X	X	4

Sheet D	1	2	3	4	5	6	7	8	9	10	Final
Northwest Territories (Moss)	0	2	0	1	4	0	0	0	0	X	7
Saskatchewan (George)	2	0	2	0	0	3	0	2	2	X	11

Sheet F	1	2	3	4	5	6	7	8	9	10	Final
Yukon (Gee)	0	0	0	3	0	1	0	1	0	X	5
Manitoba (Hamblin)	1	2	1	0	2	0	1	0	2	X	9

Sheet J	1	2	3	4	5	6	7	8	9	10	Final
Prince Edward Island (Waugh)	0	2	0	1	1	0	2	0	1	X	7
Quebec (Crete)	1	0	0	0	0	2	0	2	0	X	5

==== Draw 6 ====
Sheet B	1	2	3	4	5	6	7	8	9	10	Final
Alberta (Jacobsen)	0	3	1	0	2	1	0	0	4	X	11
Northwest Territories (Moss)	1	0	0	1	0	0	1	1	0	X	4

Sheet C	1	2	3	4	5	6	7	8	9	10	Final
Newfoundland and Labrador (LeDrew)	1	1	1	0	4	4	X	X	X	X	11
Yukon (Gee)	0	0	0	2	0	0	X	X	X	X	2

Sheet E	1	2	3	4	5	6	7	8	9	10	Final
British Columbia (Kuhn)	1	0	1	1	0	1	2	0	2	X	8
Prince Edward Island (Waugh)	0	1	0	0	1	0	0	1	0	X	3

Sheet G	1	2	3	4	5	6	7	8	9	10	Final
Manitoba (Hamblin)	0	2	1	0	1	0	0	1	4	X	9
New Brunswick (Murphy)	0	0	0	0	0	2	1	0	0	X	3

Sheet I	1	2	3	4	5	6	7	8	9	10	Final
Ontario (Armstrong)	1	1	0	0	0	1	0	0	2	X	5
Northern Ontario (Adams)	0	0	3	2	0	0	0	2	0	X	7

==== Draw 7 ====
Sheet B	1	2	3	4	5	6	7	8	9	10	Final
Ontario (Armstrong)	0	0	0	3	0	2	2	1	1	X	9
Nova Scotia (Saccary)	3	0	0	0	3	0	0	0	0	X	6

Sheet D	1	2	3	4	5	6	7	8	9	10	Final
Yukon (Gee)	2	0	1	0	2	0	0	X	X	X	5
Alberta (Jacobsen)	0	3	0	4	0	3	1	X	X	X	11

Sheet F	1	2	3	4	5	6	7	8	9	10	Final
Manitoba (Hamblin)	3	0	0	4	1	0	1	0	3	X	12
Northwest Territories (Moss)	0	1	1	0	0	1	0	1	0	X	4

Sheet H	1	2	3	4	5	6	7	8	9	10	Final
Northern Ontario (Adams)	2	0	2	0	1	1	0	2	X	X	8
Newfoundland and Labrador (LeDrew)	0	0	0	0	0	0	1	0	X	X	1

==== Draw 8 ====
Sheet B	1	2	3	4	5	6	7	8	9	10	Final
New Brunswick (Murphy)	0	0	0	1	0	3	0	2	1	0	7
Saskatchewan (George)	0	2	1	0	2	0	2	0	0	2	9

Sheet E	1	2	3	4	5	6	7	8	9	10	Final
British Columbia (Kuhn)	0	2	0	0	1	0	1	0	2	X	6
Yukon (Gee)	1	0	1	0	0	1	0	1	0	X	4

Sheet G	1	2	3	4	5	6	7	8	9	10	Final
Nova Scotia (Saccary)	1	2	0	1	0	2	0	2	0	X	8
Prince Edward Island (Waugh)	0	0	2	0	1	0	2	0	0	X	5

Sheet I	1	2	3	4	5	6	7	8	9	10	11	Final
Newfoundland and Labrador (LeDrew)	0	2	1	0	1	0	0	0	2	0	0	6
Quebec (Crete)	0	0	0	2	0	2	0	2	0	0	1	7

==== Draw 9 ====
Sheet A	1	2	3	4	5	6	7	8	9	10	Final
Prince Edward Island (Waugh)	3	0	0	0	2	0	4	0	2	X	11
Manitoba (Hamblin)	0	1	0	2	0	1	0	1	0	X	5

Sheet D	1	2	3	4	5	6	7	8	9	10	Final
Northwest Territories (Moss)	1	1	0	0	0	2	1	0	0	0	5
Northern Ontario (Adams)	0	0	1	2	2	0	0	0	0	1	6

Sheet F	1	2	3	4	5	6	7	8	9	10	Final
Alberta (Jacobsen)	0	1	0	0	2	0	4	0	0	1	8
Ontario (Armstrong)	0	0	0	1	0	3	0	2	0	0	6

Sheet G	1	2	3	4	5	6	7	8	9	10	Final
Quebec (Crete)	0	1	0	2	1	1	3	X	X	X	8
New Brunswick (Murphy)	0	0	1	0	0	0	0	X	X	X	1

Sheet I	1	2	3	4	5	6	7	8	9	10	Final
Saskatchewan (George)	0	1	0	0	2	0	0	0	0	0	3
British Columbia (Kuhn)	0	0	1	0	0	1	0	1	1	1	5

==== Draw 10 ====
Sheet B	1	2	3	4	5	6	7	8	9	10	Final
British Columbia (Kuhn)	2	0	0	2	0	0	0	2	1	X	7
Quebec (Crete)	0	0	2	0	0	0	1	0	0	X	3

Sheet D	1	2	3	4	5	6	7	8	9	10	Final
Nova Scotia (Saccary)	2	0	1	1	1	0	1	1	0	X	7
Yukon (Gee)	0	0	0	0	0	2	0	0	1	X	3

Sheet H	1	2	3	4	5	6	7	8	9	10	Final
Alberta (Jacobsen)	0	1	0	1	0	0	2	0	0	2	6
Saskatchewan (George)	0	0	2	0	1	0	0	0	1	0	4

Sheet J	1	2	3	4	5	6	7	8	9	10	Final
Newfoundland and Labrador (LeDrew)	1	0	0	1	0	0	1	0	X	X	3
Manitoba (Hamblin)	0	2	1	0	1	1	0	3	X	X	8

==== Draw 11 ====
Sheet A	1	2	3	4	5	6	7	8	9	10	Final
Quebec (Crete)	0	0	3	0	2	0	2	1	0	X	8
Northwest Territories (Moss)	1	0	0	2	0	1	0	0	1	X	5

Sheet C	1	2	3	4	5	6	7	8	9	10	Final
New Brunswick (Murphy)	2	0	0	0	0	1	0	0	X	X	3
Northern Ontario (Adams)	0	2	3	0	0	0	1	2	X	X	8

Sheet G	1	2	3	4	5	6	7	8	9	10	Final
Manitoba (Hamblin)	2	0	0	1	0	1	0	0	1	X	5
Ontario (Armstrong)	0	3	0	0	2	0	3	0	0	X	8

Sheet J	1	2	3	4	5	6	7	8	9	10	Final
Prince Edward Island (Waugh)	0	1	0	0	2	1	1	0	0	X	5
Alberta (Jacobsen)	0	0	0	0	0	0	0	2	0	X	2

==== Draw 12 ====
Sheet B	1	2	3	4	5	6	7	8	9	10	Final
Northern Ontario (Adams)	1	0	2	0	1	0	0	1	0	3	8
Prince Edward Island (Waugh)	0	2	0	1	0	1	1	0	2	0	7

Sheet C	1	2	3	4	5	6	7	8	9	10	Final
Ontario (Armstrong)	1	0	0	0	1	0	2	0	0	X	4
British Columbia (Kuhn)	0	1	0	3	0	3	0	1	0	X	8

Sheet F	1	2	3	4	5	6	7	8	9	10	Final
Saskatchewan (George)	3	0	0	0	2	0	1	0	0	2	8
Newfoundland and Labrador (LeDrew)	0	0	2	1	0	0	0	4	0	0	7

Sheet G	1	2	3	4	5	6	7	8	9	10	Final
Northwest Territories (Moss)	0	0	1	0	1	0	0	X	X	X	2
Nova Scotia (Saccary)	0	1	0	2	0	5	4	X	X	X	12

Sheet I	1	2	3	4	5	6	7	8	9	10	Final
Yukon (Gee)	0	0	0	1	0	1	2	0	1	0	5
New Brunswick (Murphy)	0	1	2	0	3	0	0	1	0	1	8

==== Draw 13 ====
Sheet A	1	2	3	4	5	6	7	8	9	10	Final
British Columbia (Kuhn)	0	1	0	0	0	1	0	0	0	0	2
Manitoba (Hamblin)	0	0	0	2	0	0	0	2	0	1	5

Sheet C	1	2	3	4	5	6	7	8	9	10	11	Final
New Brunswick (Murphy)	1	0	2	0	1	0	2	0	0	1	1	8
Nova Scotia (Saccary)	0	1	0	2	0	1	0	2	1	0	0	7

Sheet G	1	2	3	4	5	6	7	8	9	10	Final
Northern Ontario (Adams)	0	3	1	0	3	1	0	X	X	X	8
Yukon (Gee)	1	0	0	1	0	0	1	X	X	X	3

Sheet J	1	2	3	4	5	6	7	8	9	10	Final
Quebec (Crete)	0	1	2	0	1	0	4	0	2	X	10
Ontario (Armstrong)	0	0	0	1	0	2	0	2	0	X	5

==== Draw 14 ====
Sheet A	1	2	3	4	5	6	7	8	9	10	Final
Ontario (Armstrong)	0	2	0	0	0	1	0	X	X	X	3
Newfoundland and Labrador (LeDrew)	0	0	2	2	3	0	3	X	X	X	10

Sheet C	1	2	3	4	5	6	7	8	9	10	Final
Alberta (Jacobsen)	2	0	0	1	0	0	1	0	1	0	5
Northern Ontario (Adams)	0	2	0	0	0	1	0	2	0	1	6

Sheet F	1	2	3	4	5	6	7	8	9	10	Final
Northwest Territories (Moss)	1	0	0	0	1	0	1	0	0	X	3
British Columbia (Kuhn)	0	0	0	3	0	1	0	1	1	X	6

Sheet I	1	2	3	4	5	6	7	8	9	10	Final
Saskatchewan (George)	2	5	0	1	0	2	X	X	X	X	10
Prince Edward Island (Waugh)	0	0	1	0	2	0	X	X	X	X	3

==== Draw 15 ====
Sheet B	1	2	3	4	5	6	7	8	9	10	11	Final
Prince Edward Island (Waugh)	1	0	2	0	0	1	0	1	2	0	0	7
New Brunswick (Murphy)	0	0	0	2	1	0	1	0	0	3	3	10

Sheet C	1	2	3	4	5	6	7	8	9	10	Final
Manitoba (Hamblin)	1	0	2	0	0	1	2	3	X	X	9
Saskatchewan (George)	0	1	0	1	0	0	0	0	X	X	2

Sheet E	1	2	3	4	5	6	7	8	9	10	Final
Nova Scotia (Saccary)	1	0	0	1	0	1	0	2	0	X	5
Quebec (Crete)	0	0	2	0	3	0	2	0	2	X	9

Sheet G	1	2	3	4	5	6	7	8	9	10	Final
Newfoundland and Labrador (LeDrew)	0	2	0	0	0	0	0	0	X	X	2
Alberta (Jacobsen)	0	0	0	2	1	1	2	1	X	X	7

Sheet I	1	2	3	4	5	6	7	8	9	10	11	Final
Yukon (Gee)	1	0	0	3	0	2	0	1	0	0	0	7
Northwest Territories (Moss)	0	1	1	0	2	0	1	0	1	1	1	8

==== Draw 16 ====
Sheet B	1	2	3	4	5	6	7	8	9	10	11	Final
Nova Scotia (Saccary)	1	0	0	0	1	0	1	0	0	1	0	4
Manitoba (Hamblin)	0	0	0	1	0	1	0	1	1	0	1	5

Sheet E	1	2	3	4	5	6	7	8	9	10	Final
Prince Edward Island (Waugh)	2	0	2	0	0	1	0	1	0	2	8
Northwest Territories (Moss)	0	2	0	1	1	0	2	0	1	0	7

Sheet F	1	2	3	4	5	6	7	8	9	10	Final
Northern Ontario (Adams)	0	2	0	0	0	0	0	0	0	0	2
Quebec (Crete)	0	0	0	0	0	1	1	1	0	1	4

Sheet J	1	2	3	4	5	6	7	8	9	10	Final
New Brunswick (Murphy)	0	1	1	0	1	0	0	0	2	X	5
British Columbia (Kuhn)	0	0	0	0	0	1	0	1	0	X	2

==== Draw 17 ====
Sheet A	1	2	3	4	5	6	7	8	9	10	Final
Quebec (Crete)	4	1	0	1	1	0	1	X	X	X	8
Saskatchewan (George)	0	0	1	0	0	0	0	X	X	X	1

Sheet D	1	2	3	4	5	6	7	8	9	10	Final
Alberta (Jacobsen)	2	0	1	0	2	0	0	3	0	0	8
Nova Scotia (Saccary)	0	1	0	2	0	2	2	0	0	2	9

Sheet F	1	2	3	4	5	6	7	8	9	10	Final
Newfoundland and Labrador (LeDrew)	1	0	0	2	0	0	0	2	0	X	5
New Brunswick (Murphy)	0	4	1	0	3	0	0	0	0	X	8

Sheet H	1	2	3	4	5	6	7	8	9	10	Final
Yukon (Gee)	1	0	0	0	1	0	X	X	X	X	2
Ontario (Armstrong)	0	1	2	3	0	3	X	X	X	X	9

==== Draw 18 ====
Sheet B	1	2	3	4	5	6	7	8	9	10	Final
Saskatchewan (George)	2	1	1	0	0	4	X	X	X	X	8
Yukon (Gee)	0	0	0	0	1	0	X	X	X	X	1

Sheet D	1	2	3	4	5	6	7	8	9	10	Final
Ontario (Armstrong)	1	0	0	3	0	2	0	1	0	1	8
Prince Edward Island (Waugh)	0	0	1	0	1	0	2	0	2	0	6

Sheet E	1	2	3	4	5	6	7	8	9	10	Final
Manitoba (Hamblin)	0	0	2	0	0	0	1	0	2	2	7
Northern Ontario (Adams)	0	0	0	1	0	2	0	1	0	0	4

Sheet G	1	2	3	4	5	6	7	8	9	10	Final
British Columbia (Kuhn)	0	3	0	1	0	0	1	0	3	X	8
Alberta (Jacobsen)	0	0	1	0	1	1	0	1	0	X	4

Sheet I	1	2	3	4	5	6	7	8	9	10	Final
Northwest Territories (Moss)	2	0	1	0	0	0	0	X	X	X	3
Newfoundland and Labrador (LeDrew)	0	3	0	3	3	1	2	X	X	X	12

=== Playoffs ===
Semifinal		Final
Northern Ontario	2
Manitoba	5	Quebec	4
		Manitoba	5

==== Semifinal ====
Sheet H	1	2	3	4	5	6	7	8	9	10	Final
Northern Ontario (Adams)	0	0	1	0	0	0	0	0	1	0	2
Manitoba (Hamblin)	0	0	0	2	0	1	1	0	0	1	5

Player percentages
Northern Ontario		Manitoba	
Justin McCarville	88%	Ross McCannell	91%
Colin Koivula	86%	Kevin Hamblin	88%
Ben Mikkelsen	89%	Ross Derksen	75%
Brian Adams	69%	David Hamblin	83%
Total	83%	Total	84%

==== Final ====
Sheet C	1	2	3	4	5	6	7	8	9	10	Final
Quebec (Crete)	0	1	0	0	0	0	0	0	2	1	4
Manitoba (Hamblin)	1	0	0	0	1	1	1	1	0	0	5

Player percentages
Quebec		Manitoba	
Olivier Leclerc	71%	Ross McCannell	70%
Kevin White	73%	Kevin Hamblin	84%
Jonathan Tremblay	81%	Ross Derksen	85%
Martin Crete	70%	David Hamblin	88%
Total	74%	Total	82%

== Women's ==
=== Teams ===
Province / Territory	Skip	Third	Second	Lead	Club
Alberta	Jennifer Vejprava	Erika Hildebrand	Kristen Moore	Sue Loftus	Calgary CC, Calgary
British Columbia	Allison Shivas	Diana Shivas	Steph Jackson	Heather Shivas	Victoria CC, Victoria
Manitoba	Kristen Williamson	Amber Dawson	Riki Komyshyn	Kyleigh Smith	St. Vital CC, Winnipeg
New Brunswick	Andrea Kelly	Kristen MacDiarmid	Jodie deSolla	Melissa Taylor	Perth-Andover Legion CC, Perth-Andover
Newfoundland and Labrador	Jennifer Guzzwell	Shelley Nichols	Stephanie LeDrew	Noelle Thomas	St. John's CC, St. John's
Northern Ontario	Krista Scharf	Julie Risi	Laura Armitage	Maggie Carr	Fort William CC, Thunder Bay
Northwest Territories	Danielle Ellis	Brie-Anne Jefferson	Tristan Koswan	Jenna Alexander	Yellowknife CC, Yellowknife
Nova Scotia	Robyn Mattie	Paige Mattie	Meaghan Smart	Gilda Chisholm	Chedabucto CC, Boylston
Ontario	Julie Reddick	Karen Vachon	Leigh Armstrong	Steph Leachman	Oakville CC, Oakville
Prince Edward Island	Suzanne Gaudet	Robyn MacPhee	Carol Webb	Kelly Higgins	Silver Fox C&YC, Summerside
Quebec	Marie Lapierre	Catherine Menard	Julie Bouchard	Genevieve Marchand	Mt. Bruno CC, Saint-Bruno-de-Montarville & CC Boucherville, Boucherville
Saskatchewan	Jolene McIvor	Teejay Surik	Janelle Lemon	Maegan Strueby	Nutana CC, Saskatoon
Yukon	Ladene Shaw	Stacey Sellars	Jessie Leschart	Mandi Shaw	Whitehorse CC, Whitehorse

=== Standings ===
Locale	Skip	W	L
Newfoundland and Labrador	Jennifer Guzzwell	10	2
Prince Edward Island	Suzanne Gaudet	10	2
Manitoba	Kristen Williamson	8	4
Saskatchewan	Jolene McIvor	8	4
Ontario	Julie Reddick	7	5
Alberta	Jennifer Vejprava	7	5
New Brunswick	Andrea Kelly	6	6
Northern Ontario	Krista Scharf	6	6
British Columbia	Allison Shivas	5	7
Nova Scotia	Robyn Mattie	5	7
Quebec	Marie Lapierre	4	8
Northwest Territories	Brie-Anne Jefferson	2	10
Yukon	Ladene Shaw	0	12

=== Results ===
==== Draw 1 ====
Sheet B	1	2	3	4	5	6	7	8	9	10	Final
Alberta (Vejprava)	0	1	1	0	2	0	0	3	0	0	7
New Brunswick (Kelly)	0	0	0	1	0	2	1	0	1	1	6

Sheet D	1	2	3	4	5	6	7	8	9	10	11	Final
Newfoundland and Labrador (Guzzwell)	0	1	0	0	2	0	0	4	0	0	1	8
Prince Edward Island (Gaudet)	0	0	2	1	0	1	1	0	1	1	0	7

Sheet H	1	2	3	4	5	6	7	8	9	10	Final
Ontario (Reddick)	0	3	0	3	0	1	0	0	1	0	8
Saskatchewan (McIvor)	0	0	3	0	4	0	1	0	0	1	9

Sheet J	1	2	3	4	5	6	7	8	9	10	Final
Nova Scotia (Mattie)	1	0	3	0	1	0	0	0	0	X	5
British Columbia (Shivas)	0	1	0	0	0	3	2	3	2	X	11

==== Draw 2 ====
Sheet A	1	2	3	4	5	6	7	8	9	10	Final
Yukon (Shaw)	3	1	1	0	0	1	0	0	0	0	6
Quebec (Lapierre)	0	0	0	1	1	0	2	4	4	1	13

Sheet D	1	2	3	4	5	6	7	8	9	10	Final
Northwest Territories (Jefferson)	0	1	0	1	0	1	0	1	0	X	4
Ontario (Reddick)	2	0	2	0	1	0	2	0	2	X	9

Sheet G	1	2	3	4	5	6	7	8	9	10	Final
Northern Ontario (Scharf)	0	0	0	1	0	0	1	0	X	X	2
Nova Scotia (Mattie)	0	1	1	0	0	4	0	2	X	X	8

Sheet J	1	2	3	4	5	6	7	8	9	10	Final
Manitoba (Williamson)	2	0	1	0	0	2	0	1	2	0	8
Alberta (Vejprava)	0	1	0	0	1	0	3	0	0	2	7

==== Draw 3 ====
Sheet A	1	2	3	4	5	6	7	8	9	10	Final
British Columbia (Shivas)	1	0	0	0	0	1	1	0	3	0	6
Newfoundland and Labrador (Guzzwell)	0	0	1	1	1	0	0	1	0	3	7

Sheet D	1	2	3	4	5	6	7	8	9	10	Final
Quebec (Lapierre)	0	0	1	0	0	2	2	0	1	0	6
Manitoba (Williamson)	1	0	0	1	1	0	0	1	0	1	5

Sheet F	1	2	3	4	5	6	7	8	9	10	Final
New Brunswick (Kelly)	1	0	1	0	1	0	2	0	3	0	8
Northwest Territories (Jefferson)	0	1	0	2	0	1	0	2	0	1	7

Sheet G	1	2	3	4	5	6	7	8	9	10	Final
Prince Edward Island (Gaudet)	0	5	0	3	0	3	X	X	X	X	11
Yukon (Shaw)	1	0	1	0	1	0	X	X	X	X	3

Sheet I	1	2	3	4	5	6	7	8	9	10	Final
Saskatchewan (McIvor)	0	0	0	1	0	0	0	0	X	X	1
Northern Ontario (Scharf)	0	1	1	0	3	1	1	1	X	X	8

==== Draw 4 ====
Sheet B	1	2	3	4	5	6	7	8	9	10	11	Final
Northern Ontario (Scharf)	2	0	3	0	0	0	2	0	0	0	1	8
British Columbia (Shivas)	0	1	0	1	1	1	0	2	1	0	0	7

Sheet C	1	2	3	4	5	6	7	8	9	10	Final
New Brunswick (Kelly)	0	0	0	0	2	2	2	0	0	X	6
Ontario (Reddick)	0	0	0	1	0	0	0	2	2	X	5

Sheet G	1	2	3	4	5	6	7	8	9	10	Final
Saskatchewan (McIvor)	0	0	0	1	2	2	1	0	0	X	6
Nova Scotia (Mattie)	0	0	1	0	0	0	0	1	0	X	2

Sheet J	1	2	3	4	5	6	7	8	9	10	Final
Quebec (Lapierre)	1	0	1	0	1	0	0	0	1	X	4
Alberta (Vejprava)	0	1	0	3	0	1	1	1	0	X	7

==== Draw 5 ====
Sheet B	1	2	3	4	5	6	7	8	9	10	Final
Nova Scotia (Mattie)	2	0	1	0	0	0	0	1	0	X	4
Newfoundland and Labrador (Guzzwell)	0	1	0	1	1	1	3	0	3	X	10

Sheet C	1	2	3	4	5	6	7	8	9	10	Final
Northwest Territories (Jefferson)	0	0	0	0	0	0	X	X	X	X	0
Saskatchewan (McIvor)	0	1	3	2	4	1	X	X	X	X	11

Sheet G	1	2	3	4	5	6	7	8	9	10	Final
Yukon (Shaw)	0	1	0	0	2	0	X	X	X	X	3
Manitoba (Willimason)	4	0	4	3	0	0	X	X	X	X	11

Sheet I	1	2	3	4	5	6	7	8	9	10	Final
Prince Edward Island (Gaudet)	3	0	1	0	4	1	1	X	X	X	10
Quebec (Lapierre)	0	1	0	1	0	0	0	X	X	X	2

==== Draw 6 ====
Sheet A	1	2	3	4	5	6	7	8	9	10	Final
Alberta (Vejprava)	1	1	0	3	0	0	0	0	4	X	9
Northwest Territories (Jefferson)	0	0	1	0	2	0	0	1	0	X	4

Sheet D	1	2	3	4	5	6	7	8	9	10	Final
Newfoundland and Labrador (Guzzwell)	2	4	2	2	1	1	X	X	X	X	12
Yukon (Shaw)	0	0	0	0	0	0	X	X	X	X	0

Sheet F	1	2	3	4	5	6	7	8	9	10	Final
British Columbia (Shivas)	1	0	0	3	0	0	1	0	X	X	5
Prince Edward Island (Gaudet)	0	4	1	0	4	1	0	1	X	X	11

Sheet H	1	2	3	4	5	6	7	8	9	10	Final
Manitoba (Williamson)	0	2	0	1	2	0	2	0	1	X	8
New Brunswick (Kelly)	0	0	0	0	0	2	0	2	0	X	4

Sheet J	1	2	3	4	5	6	7	8	9	10	Final
Ontario (Reddick)	0	2	0	2	0	3	0	1	1	X	9
Northern Ontario (Scharf)	1	0	2	0	2	0	1	0	0	X	6

==== Draw 7 ====
Sheet A	1	2	3	4	5	6	7	8	9	10	Final
Ontario (Reddick)	2	0	0	2	0	0	0	1	0	0	5
Nova Scotia (Mattie)	0	1	0	0	2	1	2	0	0	1	7

Sheet C	1	2	3	4	5	6	7	8	9	10	Final
Yukon (Shaw)	0	0	0	0	0	1	0	X	X	X	1
Alberta (Vejprava)	1	2	2	2	2	0	1	X	X	X	10

Sheet G	1	2	3	4	5	6	7	8	9	10	Final
Manitoba (Williamson)	1	0	2	0	1	0	3	1	1	X	9
Northwest Territories (Jefferson)	0	0	0	1	0	1	0	0	0	X	2

Sheet I	1	2	3	4	5	6	7	8	9	10	Final
Northern Ontario (Scharf)	0	1	0	0	1	2	1	0	0	2	7
Newfoundland and Labrador (Guzzwell)	1	0	2	0	0	0	0	2	1	0	6

==== Draw 8 ====
Sheet C	1	2	3	4	5	6	7	8	9	10	Final
New Brunswick (Kelly)	0	1	1	0	0	0	0	1	0	X	3
Saskatchewan (McIvor)	3	0	0	0	0	0	5	0	1	X	9

Sheet D	1	2	3	4	5	6	7	8	9	10	Final
British Columbia (Shivas)	2	2	1	1	1	1	X	X	X	X	8
Yukon (Shaw)	0	0	0	0	0	0	X	X	X	X	0

Sheet H	1	2	3	4	5	6	7	8	9	10	Final
Nova Scotia (Mattie)	0	1	0	1	0	0	0	0	X	X	2
Prince Edward Island (Gaudet)	1	0	2	0	1	0	2	1	X	X	7

Sheet J	1	2	3	4	5	6	7	8	9	10	Final
Newfoundland and Labrador (Guzzwell)	1	1	1	3	0	1	0	1	1	X	9
Quebec (Lapierre)	0	0	0	0	1	0	2	0	0	X	3

==== Draw 9 ====
Sheet B	1	2	3	4	5	6	7	8	9	10	Final
Prince Edward Island (Gaudet)	1	0	0	4	0	1	0	1	0	1	8
Manitoba (Williamson)	0	0	1	0	2	0	2	0	1	0	6

Sheet C	1	2	3	4	5	6	7	8	9	10	Final
Northwest Territories (Jefferson)	0	0	1	0	2	0	0	2	2	0	7
Northern Ontario (Scharf)	1	1	0	1	0	3	2	0	0	2	10

Sheet E	1	2	3	4	5	6	7	8	9	10	Final
Alberta (Vejprava)	2	0	0	0	0	0	1	0	1	0	4
Ontario (Reddick)	0	0	1	1	0	2	0	2	0	2	8

Sheet H	1	2	3	4	5	6	7	8	9	10	Final
Quebec (Lapierre)	2	0	0	1	0	0	4	0	1	0	8
New Brunswick (Kelly)	0	2	2	0	3	2	0	0	0	1	10

Sheet J	1	2	3	4	5	6	7	8	9	10	11	Final
Saskatchewan (McIvor)	0	0	0	2	0	0	1	0	3	0	0	6
British Columbia (Shivas)	1	0	1	0	1	0	0	1	0	2	1	7

==== Draw 10 ====
Sheet A	1	2	3	4	5	6	7	8	9	10	Final
British Columbia (Shivas)	1	0	1	0	0	1	0	2	0	1	6
Quebec (Lapierre)	0	1	0	0	1	0	2	0	1	0	5

Sheet C	1	2	3	4	5	6	7	8	9	10	Final
Nova Scotia (Mattie)	2	2	1	0	1	0	0	2	1	X	9
Yukon (Shaw)	0	0	0	1	0	1	1	0	0	X	3

Sheet G	1	2	3	4	5	6	7	8	9	10	Final
Alberta (Vejprava)	0	3	0	0	1	0	0	0	2	0	6
Saskatchewan (McIvor)	0	0	1	2	0	2	0	1	0	1	7

Sheet I	1	2	3	4	5	6	7	8	9	10	Final
Newfoundland and Labrador (Guzzwell)	1	0	1	0	2	3	0	2	X	X	9
Manitoba (Williamson)	0	1	0	1	0	0	2	0	X	X	4

==== Draw 11 ====
Sheet B	1	2	3	4	5	6	7	8	9	10	Final
Quebec (Lapierre)	0	3	0	0	0	2	0	2	0	X	7
Northwest Territories (Jefferson)	1	0	2	0	1	0	1	0	1	X	6

Sheet D	1	2	3	4	5	6	7	8	9	10	Final
New Brunswick (Kelly)	1	0	1	1	1	0	1	0	0	2	7
Northern Ontario (Scharf)	0	2	0	0	0	1	0	0	2	0	5

Sheet F	1	2	3	4	5	6	7	8	9	10	Final
Manitoba (Williamson)	1	0	0	1	1	1	1	0	0	1	6
Ontario (Reddick)	0	0	0	0	0	0	0	3	1	0	4

Sheet I	1	2	3	4	5	6	7	8	9	10	Final
Prince Edward Island (Gaudet)	0	0	1	0	2	0	1	3	0	X	7
Alberta (Vejprava)	0	0	0	0	0	1	0	0	1	X	2

==== Draw 12 ====
Sheet A	1	2	3	4	5	6	7	8	9	10	Final
Northern Ontario (Scharf)	1	0	0	2	0	0	1	0	2	X	6
Prince Edward Island (Gaudet)	0	0	3	0	1	0	0	4	0	X	8

Sheet D	1	2	3	4	5	6	7	8	9	10	Final
Ontario (Reddick)	0	0	3	1	0	1	0	1	0	3	9
British Columbia (Shivas)	0	0	0	0	4	0	1	0	1	0	6

Sheet E	1	2	3	4	5	6	7	8	9	10	11	Final
Saskatchewan (McIvor)	1	1	0	2	0	1	0	0	0	1	0	6
Newfoundland and Labrador (Guzzwell)	0	0	0	0	3	0	2	0	1	0	1	7

Sheet H	1	2	3	4	5	6	7	8	9	10	Final
Northwest Territories (Jefferson)	1	0	1	0	2	2	0	1	0	X	7
Nova Scotia (Mattie)	0	5	0	2	0	0	1	0	2	X	10

Sheet J	1	2	3	4	5	6	7	8	9	10	Final
Yukon (Shaw)	0	1	0	2	0	0	X	X	X	X	3
New Brunswick (Kelly)	3	0	4	0	4	1	X	X	X	X	12

==== Draw 13 ====
Sheet B	1	2	3	4	5	6	7	8	9	10	Final
British Columbia (Shivas)	0	1	0	2	2	0	1	1	X	X	7
Manitoba (Williamson)	0	0	1	0	0	0	0	0	X	X	1

Sheet D	1	2	3	4	5	6	7	8	9	10	Final
New Brunswick (Kelly)	0	0	0	1	0	1	0	1	X	X	3
Nova Scotia (Mattie)	1	3	1	0	1	0	2	0	X	X	8

Sheet F	1	2	3	4	5	6	7	8	9	10	Final
Northern Ontario (Scharf)	6	0	1	2	5	0	X	X	X	X	14
Yukon (Shaw)	0	2	0	0	0	1	X	X	X	X	3

Sheet I	1	2	3	4	5	6	7	8	9	10	Final
Quebec (Lapierre)	1	0	0	0	0	1	0	0	1	X	3
Ontario (Reddick)	0	3	0	2	1	0	1	0	0	X	7

==== Draw 14 ====
Sheet B	1	2	3	4	5	6	7	8	9	10	Final
Ontario (Reddick)	1	0	0	1	0	2	0	1	0	1	6
Newfoundland and Labrador (Guzzwell)	0	0	1	0	2	0	0	0	1	0	4

Sheet D	1	2	3	4	5	6	7	8	9	10	Final
Alberta (Vejprava)	0	0	0	0	0	3	0	4	0	X	7
Northern Ontario (Scharf)	0	0	1	0	1	0	1	0	1	X	4

Sheet G	1	2	3	4	5	6	7	8	9	10	Final
Northwest Territories (Jefferson)	1	2	0	2	1	0	1	0	0	1	8
British Columbia (Shivas)	0	0	1	0	0	2	0	2	1	0	6

Sheet H	1	2	3	4	5	6	7	8	9	10	Final
Saskatchewan (McIvor)	0	1	0	3	2	2	0	1	X	X	9
Prince Edward Island (Gaudet)	0	0	2	0	0	0	1	0	X	X	3

==== Draw 15 ====
Sheet A	1	2	3	4	5	6	7	8	9	10	Final
Prince Edward Island (Gaudet)	1	0	1	0	1	0	0	2	1	1	7
New Brunswick (Kelly)	0	2	0	1	0	1	1	0	0	0	5

Sheet D	1	2	3	4	5	6	7	8	9	10	11	Final
Manitoba (Williamson)	1	0	0	0	1	1	0	2	0	1	1	7
Saskatchewan (McIvor)	0	0	1	0	0	0	2	0	3	0	0	6

Sheet F	1	2	3	4	5	6	7	8	9	10	Final
Nova Scotia (Mattie)	0	0	0	0	0	1	0	X	X	X	1
Quebec (Lapierre)	0	0	3	1	2	0	3	X	X	X	9

Sheet H	1	2	3	4	5	6	7	8	9	10	Final
Newfoundland and Labrador (Guzzwell)	0	1	1	1	0	0	0	0	0	1	4
Alberta (Vejprava)	0	0	0	0	2	0	1	0	0	0	3

Sheet J	1	2	3	4	5	6	7	8	9	10	Final
Yukon (Shaw)	0	0	0	1	0	0	3	0	1	X	5
Northwest Territories (Jefferson)	3	1	1	0	1	1	0	2	0	X	9

==== Draw 16 ====
Sheet A	1	2	3	4	5	6	7	8	9	10	Final
Nova Scotia (Mattie)	0	1	0	0	0	0	0	X	X	X	1
Manitoba (Williamson)	0	0	2	1	3	1	1	X	X	X	8

Sheet D	1	2	3	4	5	6	7	8	9	10	Final
Prince Edward Island (Gaudet)	1	1	0	3	4	0	1	X	X	X	10
Northwest Territories (Jefferson)	0	0	1	0	0	1	0	X	X	X	2

Sheet G	1	2	3	4	5	6	7	8	9	10	11	Final
Northern Ontario (Scharf)	1	0	1	1	3	0	0	2	1	0	1	10
Quebec (Lapierre)	0	2	0	0	0	3	3	0	0	1	0	9

Sheet I	1	2	3	4	5	6	7	8	9	10	Final
New Brunswick (Kelly)	2	0	0	0	2	0	2	0	2	2	10
British Columbia (Shivas)	0	4	1	0	0	1	0	1	0	0	7

==== Draw 17 ====
Sheet B	1	2	3	4	5	6	7	8	9	10	11	Final
Quebec (Lapierre)	1	0	0	2	0	1	0	0	2	2	0	8
Saskatchewan (McIvor)	0	4	0	0	2	0	1	1	0	0	1	9

Sheet E	1	2	3	4	5	6	7	8	9	10	Final
Alberta (Vejprava)	0	2	0	4	0	0	0	4	2	X	12
Nova Scotia (Mattie)	2	0	1	0	4	0	1	0	0	X	8

Sheet G	1	2	3	4	5	6	7	8	9	10	Final
Newfoundland and Labrador (Guzzwell)	0	1	0	0	2	1	0	1	2	X	7
New Brunswick (Kelly)	0	0	0	1	0	0	1	0	0	X	2

Sheet I	1	2	3	4	5	6	7	8	9	10	Final
Yukon (Shaw)	0	0	1	0	0	1	0	X	X	X	2
Ontario (Reddick)	1	4	0	1	2	0	2	X	X	X	10

==== Draw 18 ====
Sheet A	1	2	3	4	5	6	7	8	9	10	Final
Saskatchewan (McIvor)	4	2	0	2	1	1	2	X	X	X	12
Yukon (Shaw)	0	0	2	0	0	0	0	X	X	X	2

Sheet C	1	2	3	4	5	6	7	8	9	10	Final
Ontario (Reddick)	0	0	0	1	0	1	0	0	1	0	3
Prince Edward Island (Gaudet)	0	0	1	0	1	0	0	1	0	1	4

Sheet F	1	2	3	4	5	6	7	8	9	10	Final
Manitoba (Williamson)	1	0	3	0	0	1	0	0	0	2	7
Northern Ontario (Scharf)	0	1	0	1	1	0	0	1	0	0	4

Sheet H	1	2	3	4	5	6	7	8	9	10	Final
British Columbia (Shivas)	1	0	1	0	0	0	1	0	0	X	3
Alberta (Vejprava)	0	1	0	2	0	0	0	2	3	X	8

Sheet J	1	2	3	4	5	6	7	8	9	10	Final
Northwest Territories (Jefferson)	0	1	0	1	0	1	0	0	1	0	4
Newfoundland and Labrador (Guzzwell)	0	0	1	0	3	0	2	1	0	0	7

=== Playoffs ===
Tiebreaker		Semifinal		Final
Saskatchewan	8
Manitoba	3	Prince Edward Island	9
		Saskatchewan	5
				Newfoundland and Labrador	4
				Prince Edward Island	6

==== Tiebreaker ====
Sheet H	1	2	3	4	5	6	7	8	9	10	Final
Saskatchewan (McIvor)	1	0	2	1	1	2	0	0	1	X	8
Manitoba (Williamson)	0	1	0	0	0	0	1	1	0	X	3

Player percentages
Saskatchewan		Manitoba	
Maegan Strueby	81%	Kyleigh Smith	85%
Janelle Lemon	99%	Riki Komyshyn	81%
Teejay Surik	93%	Amber Dawson	83%
Jolene McIvor	92%	Kristen Williamson	61%
Total	91%	Total	77%

==== Semifinal ====
Sheet I	1	2	3	4	5	6	7	8	9	10	Final
Prince Edward Island (Gaudet)	2	0	2	0	1	0	0	2	0	2	9
Saskatchewan (McIvor)	0	1	0	2	0	0	1	0	1	0	5

Player percentages
Prince Edward Island		Saskatchewan	
Kelly Higgins	83%	Maegan Strueby	78%
Carol Webb	89%	Janelle Lemon	83%
Robyn MacPhee	86%	Teejay Surik	69%
Suzanne Gaudet	89%	Jolene McIvor	66%
Total	87%	Total	74%

==== Final ====
Sheet C	1	2	3	4	5	6	7	8	9	10	Final
Newfoundland and Labrador (Guzzwell)	0	1	0	0	0	2	0	1	0	0	4
Prince Edward Island (Gaudet)	0	0	1	1	0	0	2	0	1	1	6

Player percentages
Newfoundland and Labrador		Prince Edward Island	
Noelle Thomas	65%	Kelly Higgins	80%
Stephanie LeDrew	79%	Carol Webb	83%
Shelley Nichols	76%	Robyn MacPhee	81%
Jennifer Guzzwell	71%	Suzanne Gaudet	79%
Total	73%	Total	81%

== Qualification ==
=== Ontario ===
The Teranet Ontario Junior Curling Championships were held January 2–6 at the Unionville Curling Club in Unionville.

Julie Reddick of Oakville defeated Melanie Robillard's Ottawa Curling Club rink in the women's final 5–3. In the men's final, Jeff Armstrong of Owen Sound beat Guelph's Jason Newland 8–4.
