= Russ Wookey =

Canadian curler

- Curler ♂
- Born: March 13, 1953 (age 73)

Team
- Curling club: Pembina CC, Winnipeg, MB

Curling career
- Member Association: Manitoba
- Brier: 2 (1984, 1986)
- World Championship: 1 (1984)
Medal record
Men's curling
Representing Manitoba
Labatt Brier
Gold medal – first place	1984 Victoria

Russell Wookey (born March 13, 1953) is a Canadian curler. He won the 1984 Brier playing lead on the Mike Riley rink.

At the time of the 1984 Brier, Wookey was employed as a lawyer.

== Teams ==
Season	Skip	Third	Second	Lead	Alternate	Events
1983–84	Mike Riley	Brian Toews	John Helston	Russ Wookey	Clare DeBlonde (Brier)	Brier 1984 (gold); WCC 1984 (4th)
1984–85	Mike Riley	Brian Toews	John Helston	Russ Wookey		
1985–86	Mike Riley	Brian Toews	Russ Wookey	Terry Henry	Clare DeBlonde	Brier 1986 (5th)
1996–97	Dave Iverson	Greg McGibbon	Russ Hayes	Russ Wookey		
1998–99	Brian White	Lyle Derry	Russ Hays	Russ Wookey		
1999–00	Brian White	Lyle Derry	Russ Hays	Russ Wookey		
