= Brian Toews =

Canadian curler (1941–2019)

- Curler ♂
- Born: December 16, 1941; Altona, Manitoba
- Died: January 27, 2019 (aged 77); Winnipeg, Manitoba

Team
- Curling club: Pembina CC, Winnipeg

Curling career
- Member Association: Manitoba
- Brier: 2 (1984, 1986)
- World Championship: 1 (1984)
Medal record
Men's curling
Representing Manitoba
Labatt Brier
Gold medal – first place	1984 Victoria

Ernest Brian Toews (December 16, 1941 – January 27, 2019) was a Canadian curler. He won the 1984 Brier playing third on the Mike Riley rink, and won a silver medal at the 1998 Canadian Senior Curling Championships. After playing in the 1986 Labatt Brier, he retired from competitive curling due to a bad knee.

== Personal life ==
Toews was born in Altona, Manitoba and grew up on a family farm. He played baseball in his youth, playing for the Plum Coulee Pirates in the Southeastern Manitoba League. In 1961 he moved to Winnipeg. At the time of the 1984 Brier, he was an accountant for James B Carter Ltd. He was married and had one son.

== Teams ==
Season	Skip	Third	Second	Lead	Alternate	Events
1983–84	Mike Riley	Brian Toews	John Helston	Russ Wookey	Clare DeBlonde (Brier)	Brier 1984 (gold); WCC 1984 (4th)
1984–85	Mike Riley	Brian Toews	John Helston	Russ Wookey		
1985–86	Mike Riley	Brian Toews	Russ Wookey	Terry Henry	Clare DeBlonde	Brier 1986 (5th)
1993–94	Clare DeBlonde	Brian Toews	John Helston	Garry De Blonde		
1997–98	Clare DeBlonde	Brian Toews	John Helston	Garry De Blonde		CSCC 1998 (silver)
