= 1984 Labatt Brier =

- Host city: Victoria, British Columbia
- Arena: Victoria Memorial Arena
- Dates: March 4–11
- Attendance: 86,811
- Winner: Manitoba
- Curling club: Pembina CC, Winnipeg
- Skip: Mike Riley
- Third: Brian Toews
- Second: John Helston
- Lead: Russ Wookey
- Alternate: Clare DeBlonde
- Finalist: Ontario (Ed Werenich)

The 1984 Labatt Brier was held from March 4 to 11 at the Victoria Memorial Arena in Victoria, British Columbia.

Mike Riley of Manitoba defeated Ed Werenich of Ontario to win his first and only Brier title.

== Teams ==
The teams were listed as follows:

| Alberta | British Columbia | Manitoba | New Brunswick |
|---|---|---|---|
| Calgary CC, Calgary Skip: Ed Lukowich; Third: John Ferguson; Second: Neil Houston; Lead: Brent Syme | Vancouver CC, Vancouver Skip: Bernie Sparkes; Third: Jim Armstrong (Note: For Draws 4 and 5, Team British Columbia's alternate Brent Giles threw third stones while third Jim Armstrong was unable to play due to back spasms.); Second: Ron Thompson; Lead: Jim Heintz; Alternate: Brent Giles | Pembina CC, Winnipeg Skip: Mike Riley; Third: Brian Toews; Second: John Helston; Lead: Russ Wookey; Alternate: Clare DeBlonde | Thistle St. Andrews CC, Saint John Skip: Arnie Dobson; Third: Richard Belyea; Second: Michael Dobson; Lead: Claude Moore (Note: Team New Brunswick alternate Brian Dobson threw lead stones in Draw 13.); Alternate: Brian Dobson |
| Newfoundland | Northern Ontario | Nova Scotia | Ontario |
| St. John's CC, St. John's Skip: Jeff Thomas; Third: Geoff Cunningham; Second: John Allan; Lead: Neil Young | Horne Granite CC, New Liskeard Skip: Gord McKnight; Third: Bill Johnston; Second: Brian Carr; Lead: Reg Gardner | Bluenose CC, New Glasgow Skip: Ragnar Kamp; Third: Vic Langille; Second: Rod McCarron; Lead: Haylett Clarke | Avonlea CC, Don Mills Skip: Ed Werenich; Third: Paul Savage; Second: John Kawaja; Lead: Neil Harrison |
| Prince Edward Island | Quebec | Saskatchewan | Northwest Territories/Yukon |
| Charlottetown CC, Charlottetown Skip: Wayne Matheson; Third: Ken MacDonald; Second: Allan Ledgerwood; Lead: Mark Victor (Note: For Draws 9 and 11, Team Prince Edward Island alternate Keith MacEachern threw lead stones while lead Mark Victor sat out.); Alternate: Keith MacEachern | Lachine CC, Montreal Skip: Rolland Pacquin; Third: Geoffrey Hinks; Second: Ronald MacDonald; Lead: Neil Millard | Caledonian CC, Regina Skip: Gary Bryden; Third: Dale Graham; Second: Wilf Foss; Lead: Jerry Zimmer | Yellowknife CC, Yellowknife Skip: Al Delmage; Third: Roy Giles; Second: Bill Strain; Lead: Ron Kapicki |

== Map of teams ==
Provincial Winners

== Round robin standings ==
Final round robin standings

Key
| Teams to Playoffs |
| Teams to Tiebreakers |

| Locale | Skip | W | L | PF | PA | EW | EL | BE | SE | S% |
|---|---|---|---|---|---|---|---|---|---|---|
| Manitoba | Mike Riley | 8 | 3 | 71 | 49 | 48 | 40 | 8 | 17 | 76% |
| Alberta | Ed Lukowich | 8 | 3 | 84 | 61 | 50 | 38 | 6 | 16 | 77% |
| Saskatchewan | Gary Bryden | 7 | 4 | 76 | 55 | 48 | 40 | 8 | 15 | 79% |
| Ontario | Ed Werenich | 7 | 4 | 70 | 61 | 49 | 43 | 7 | 17 | 77% |
| New Brunswick | Arnie Dobson | 7 | 4 | 75 | 60 | 50 | 40 | 3 | 17 | 70% |
| Northern Ontario | Gord McKnight | 6 | 5 | 72 | 68 | 49 | 48 | 3 | 13 | 71% |
| British Columbia | Bernie Sparkes | 6 | 5 | 61 | 66 | 40 | 43 | 13 | 8 | 72% |
| Nova Scotia | Ragnar Kamp | 4 | 7 | 58 | 75 | 43 | 50 | 4 | 7 | 71% |
| Prince Edward Island | Wayne Matheson | 4 | 7 | 59 | 71 | 39 | 51 | 8 | 10 | 70% |
| Quebec | Rolland Pacquin | 3 | 8 | 63 | 74 | 45 | 46 | 3 | 13 | 73% |
| Northwest Territories/Yukon | Al Delmage | 3 | 8 | 54 | 80 | 36 | 49 | 4 | 6 | 67% |
| Newfoundland | Jeff Thomas | 3 | 8 | 60 | 83 | 41 | 50 | 6 | 10 | 69% |

== Round robin results ==
=== Draw 1 ===
| Sheet A | 1 | 2 | 3 | 4 | 5 | 6 | 7 | 8 | 9 | 10 | Final |
|---|---|---|---|---|---|---|---|---|---|---|---|
| Manitoba (Riley) 🔨 | 0 | 0 | 1 | 2 | 1 | 0 | 0 | 1 | 0 | X | 5 |
| Northwest Territories/Yukon (Delmage) | 0 | 1 | 0 | 0 | 0 | 1 | 0 | 0 | 1 | X | 3 |

| Sheet B | 1 | 2 | 3 | 4 | 5 | 6 | 7 | 8 | 9 | 10 | Final |
|---|---|---|---|---|---|---|---|---|---|---|---|
| Prince Edward Island (Matheson) 🔨 | 0 | 0 | 0 | 1 | 0 | 2 | 0 | 2 | 1 | 0 | 6 |
| Nova Scotia (Kamp) | 2 | 0 | 1 | 0 | 2 | 0 | 1 | 0 | 0 | 1 | 7 |

| Sheet C | 1 | 2 | 3 | 4 | 5 | 6 | 7 | 8 | 9 | 10 | Final |
|---|---|---|---|---|---|---|---|---|---|---|---|
| Quebec (Pacquin) 🔨 | 1 | 0 | 0 | 1 | 0 | 1 | 1 | 1 | 0 | 1 | 6 |
| Newfoundland (Thomas) | 0 | 0 | 2 | 0 | 1 | 0 | 0 | 0 | 1 | 0 | 4 |

| Sheet D | 1 | 2 | 3 | 4 | 5 | 6 | 7 | 8 | 9 | 10 | Final |
|---|---|---|---|---|---|---|---|---|---|---|---|
| New Brunswick (Dobson) 🔨 | 0 | 0 | 3 | 1 | 0 | 1 | 0 | 2 | 2 | X | 9 |
| British Columbia (Sparkes) | 0 | 1 | 0 | 0 | 1 | 0 | 1 | 0 | 0 | X | 3 |

| Sheet E | 1 | 2 | 3 | 4 | 5 | 6 | 7 | 8 | 9 | 10 | Final |
|---|---|---|---|---|---|---|---|---|---|---|---|
| Ontario (Werenich) 🔨 | 0 | 2 | 0 | 4 | 0 | 2 | 0 | 0 | 0 | 1 | 9 |
| Alberta (Lukowich) | 1 | 0 | 2 | 0 | 1 | 0 | 2 | 1 | 0 | 0 | 7 |

=== Draw 2 ===
| Sheet A | 1 | 2 | 3 | 4 | 5 | 6 | 7 | 8 | 9 | 10 | Final |
|---|---|---|---|---|---|---|---|---|---|---|---|
| Ontario (Werenich) 🔨 | 0 | 1 | 0 | 0 | 1 | 0 | 1 | 0 | 1 | 0 | 4 |
| British Columbia (Sparkes) | 1 | 0 | 2 | 0 | 0 | 2 | 0 | 0 | 0 | 1 | 6 |

| Sheet B | 1 | 2 | 3 | 4 | 5 | 6 | 7 | 8 | 9 | 10 | Final |
|---|---|---|---|---|---|---|---|---|---|---|---|
| Newfoundland (Thomas) 🔨 | 0 | 0 | 2 | 0 | 0 | 0 | 0 | 0 | X | X | 2 |
| New Brunswick (Dobson) | 0 | 2 | 0 | 2 | 1 | 1 | 1 | 1 | X | X | 8 |

| Sheet C | 1 | 2 | 3 | 4 | 5 | 6 | 7 | 8 | 9 | 10 | Final |
|---|---|---|---|---|---|---|---|---|---|---|---|
| Northwest Territories/Yukon (Delmage) 🔨 | 0 | 1 | 1 | 0 | 1 | 0 | 0 | 1 | X | X | 4 |
| Alberta (Lukowich) | 1 | 0 | 0 | 2 | 0 | 3 | 3 | 0 | X | X | 9 |

| Sheet D | 1 | 2 | 3 | 4 | 5 | 6 | 7 | 8 | 9 | 10 | Final |
|---|---|---|---|---|---|---|---|---|---|---|---|
| Manitoba (Riley) 🔨 | 0 | 4 | 0 | 0 | 0 | 1 | 1 | 0 | 2 | X | 8 |
| Quebec (Pacquin) | 0 | 0 | 1 | 1 | 1 | 0 | 0 | 2 | 0 | X | 5 |

| Sheet E | 1 | 2 | 3 | 4 | 5 | 6 | 7 | 8 | 9 | 10 | 11 | Final |
|---|---|---|---|---|---|---|---|---|---|---|---|---|
| Northern Ontario (McKnight) 🔨 | 1 | 0 | 1 | 0 | 1 | 1 | 2 | 0 | 0 | 0 | 1 | 7 |
| Saskatchewan (Bryden) | 0 | 1 | 0 | 2 | 0 | 0 | 0 | 1 | 1 | 1 | 0 | 6 |

=== Draw 3 ===
| Sheet C | 1 | 2 | 3 | 4 | 5 | 6 | 7 | 8 | 9 | 10 | Final |
|---|---|---|---|---|---|---|---|---|---|---|---|
| Newfoundland (Thomas) 🔨 | 2 | 0 | 1 | 2 | 0 | 1 | 0 | 1 | 0 | X | 7 |
| Manitoba (Riley) | 0 | 0 | 0 | 0 | 2 | 0 | 1 | 0 | 1 | X | 4 |

| Sheet D | 1 | 2 | 3 | 4 | 5 | 6 | 7 | 8 | 9 | 10 | Final |
|---|---|---|---|---|---|---|---|---|---|---|---|
| Quebec (Pacquin) 🔨 | 3 | 3 | 1 | 0 | 2 | 2 | 0 | 1 | X | X | 12 |
| Northwest Territories/Yukon (Delmage) | 0 | 0 | 0 | 1 | 0 | 0 | 1 | 0 | X | X | 2 |

=== Draw 4 ===
| Sheet A | 1 | 2 | 3 | 4 | 5 | 6 | 7 | 8 | 9 | 10 | Final |
|---|---|---|---|---|---|---|---|---|---|---|---|
| Quebec (Pacquin) 🔨 | 0 | 0 | 0 | 0 | 1 | 0 | 1 | 0 | X | X | 2 |
| New Brunswick (Dobson) | 1 | 0 | 3 | 1 | 0 | 1 | 0 | 2 | X | X | 8 |

| Sheet B | 1 | 2 | 3 | 4 | 5 | 6 | 7 | 8 | 9 | 10 | 11 | Final |
|---|---|---|---|---|---|---|---|---|---|---|---|---|
| Alberta (Lukowich) 🔨 | 0 | 1 | 0 | 3 | 0 | 1 | 0 | 0 | 0 | 2 | 1 | 8 |
| Northern Ontario (McKnight) | 1 | 0 | 2 | 0 | 2 | 0 | 1 | 0 | 1 | 0 | 0 | 7 |

| Sheet C | 1 | 2 | 3 | 4 | 5 | 6 | 7 | 8 | 9 | 10 | Final |
|---|---|---|---|---|---|---|---|---|---|---|---|
| British Columbia (Sparkes) 🔨 | 0 | 0 | 2 | 0 | 0 | 1 | 0 | 1 | 0 | 1 | 5 |
| Nova Scotia (Kamp) | 0 | 1 | 0 | 0 | 1 | 0 | 1 | 0 | 1 | 0 | 4 |

| Sheet D | 1 | 2 | 3 | 4 | 5 | 6 | 7 | 8 | 9 | 10 | 11 | Final |
|---|---|---|---|---|---|---|---|---|---|---|---|---|
| Ontario (Werenich) 🔨 | 0 | 1 | 1 | 1 | 0 | 0 | 1 | 0 | 0 | 1 | 0 | 5 |
| Saskatchewan (Bryden) | 1 | 0 | 0 | 0 | 1 | 1 | 0 | 2 | 0 | 0 | 2 | 7 |

| Sheet E | 1 | 2 | 3 | 4 | 5 | 6 | 7 | 8 | 9 | 10 | Final |
|---|---|---|---|---|---|---|---|---|---|---|---|
| Newfoundland (Thomas) 🔨 | 1 | 0 | 0 | 2 | 0 | 0 | 1 | 0 | 0 | 1 | 5 |
| Prince Edward Island (Matheson) | 0 | 1 | 3 | 0 | 0 | 1 | 0 | 0 | 1 | 0 | 6 |

=== Draw 5 ===
| Sheet A | 1 | 2 | 3 | 4 | 5 | 6 | 7 | 8 | 9 | 10 | Final |
|---|---|---|---|---|---|---|---|---|---|---|---|
| Nova Scotia (Kamp) 🔨 | 0 | 0 | 1 | 0 | 0 | 0 | 0 | 1 | X | X | 2 |
| Alberta (Lukowich) | 0 | 2 | 0 | 1 | 1 | 1 | 1 | 0 | X | X | 6 |

| Sheet B | 1 | 2 | 3 | 4 | 5 | 6 | 7 | 8 | 9 | 10 | Final |
|---|---|---|---|---|---|---|---|---|---|---|---|
| Saskatchewan (Bryden) 🔨 | 1 | 0 | 0 | 2 | 0 | 0 | 0 | 2 | 1 | 2 | 8 |
| British Columbia (Sparkes) | 0 | 0 | 1 | 0 | 1 | 0 | 1 | 0 | 0 | 0 | 3 |

| Sheet C | 1 | 2 | 3 | 4 | 5 | 6 | 7 | 8 | 9 | 10 | Final |
|---|---|---|---|---|---|---|---|---|---|---|---|
| Northern Ontario (McKnight) 🔨 | 1 | 1 | 0 | 0 | 2 | 3 | 1 | 0 | X | X | 8 |
| Ontario (Werenich) | 0 | 0 | 1 | 1 | 0 | 0 | 0 | 1 | X | X | 3 |

| Sheet D | 1 | 2 | 3 | 4 | 5 | 6 | 7 | 8 | 9 | 10 | Final |
|---|---|---|---|---|---|---|---|---|---|---|---|
| Northwest Territories/Yukon (Delmage) 🔨 | 0 | 1 | 0 | 1 | 0 | 0 | 0 | 0 | X | X | 2 |
| Prince Edward Island (Matheson) | 1 | 0 | 2 | 0 | 0 | 1 | 4 | 1 | X | X | 9 |

| Sheet E | 1 | 2 | 3 | 4 | 5 | 6 | 7 | 8 | 9 | 10 | Final |
|---|---|---|---|---|---|---|---|---|---|---|---|
| New Brunswick (Dobson) 🔨 | 1 | 0 | 1 | 0 | 0 | 1 | 0 | 1 | 1 | 2 | 7 |
| Manitoba (Riley) | 0 | 1 | 0 | 1 | 1 | 0 | 3 | 0 | 0 | 0 | 6 |

=== Draw 6 ===
| Sheet B | 1 | 2 | 3 | 4 | 5 | 6 | 7 | 8 | 9 | 10 | Final |
|---|---|---|---|---|---|---|---|---|---|---|---|
| New Brunswick (Dobson) 🔨 | 0 | 0 | 0 | 2 | 0 | 0 | 0 | 2 | 0 | X | 4 |
| Ontario (Werenich) | 1 | 1 | 1 | 0 | 0 | 1 | 1 | 0 | 3 | X | 8 |

| Sheet C | 1 | 2 | 3 | 4 | 5 | 6 | 7 | 8 | 9 | 10 | Final |
|---|---|---|---|---|---|---|---|---|---|---|---|
| Alberta (Lukowich) 🔨 | 0 | 0 | 1 | 0 | 0 | 0 | 0 | 1 | X | X | 2 |
| British Columbia (Sparkes) | 3 | 1 | 0 | 0 | 3 | 1 | 2 | 0 | X | X | 10 |

=== Draw 7 ===
| Sheet A | 1 | 2 | 3 | 4 | 5 | 6 | 7 | 8 | 9 | 10 | Final |
|---|---|---|---|---|---|---|---|---|---|---|---|
| Newfoundland (Thomas) 🔨 | 0 | 0 | 0 | 0 | 0 | 0 | 1 | 0 | X | X | 1 |
| Saskatchewan (Bryden) | 2 | 0 | 1 | 2 | 3 | 1 | 0 | 1 | X | X | 10 |

| Sheet B | 1 | 2 | 3 | 4 | 5 | 6 | 7 | 8 | 9 | 10 | Final |
|---|---|---|---|---|---|---|---|---|---|---|---|
| Quebec (Pacquin) 🔨 | 0 | 0 | 0 | 1 | 0 | 0 | 1 | 0 | X | X | 2 |
| Alberta (Lukowich) | 2 | 3 | 0 | 0 | 0 | 3 | 0 | 3 | X | X | 11 |

| Sheet C | 1 | 2 | 3 | 4 | 5 | 6 | 7 | 8 | 9 | 10 | Final |
|---|---|---|---|---|---|---|---|---|---|---|---|
| Prince Edward Island (Matheson) 🔨 | 0 | 1 | 0 | 3 | 0 | 1 | 0 | 0 | 0 | 0 | 5 |
| New Brunswick (Dobson) | 0 | 0 | 2 | 0 | 1 | 0 | 2 | 1 | 1 | 1 | 8 |

| Sheet D | 1 | 2 | 3 | 4 | 5 | 6 | 7 | 8 | 9 | 10 | 11 | Final |
|---|---|---|---|---|---|---|---|---|---|---|---|---|
| Northern Ontario (McKnight) 🔨 | 0 | 0 | 1 | 0 | 1 | 0 | 1 | 0 | 0 | 1 | 0 | 4 |
| Manitoba (Riley) | 0 | 1 | 0 | 1 | 0 | 1 | 0 | 1 | 0 | 0 | 1 | 5 |

| Sheet E | 1 | 2 | 3 | 4 | 5 | 6 | 7 | 8 | 9 | 10 | Final |
|---|---|---|---|---|---|---|---|---|---|---|---|
| Nova Scotia (Kamp) 🔨 | 2 | 0 | 1 | 0 | 0 | 1 | 0 | 2 | 0 | 0 | 6 |
| Northwest Territories/Yukon (Delmage) | 0 | 2 | 0 | 1 | 0 | 0 | 3 | 0 | 0 | 1 | 7 |

=== Draw 8 ===
| Sheet A | 1 | 2 | 3 | 4 | 5 | 6 | 7 | 8 | 9 | 10 | Final |
|---|---|---|---|---|---|---|---|---|---|---|---|
| Prince Edward Island (Matheson) 🔨 | 0 | 1 | 1 | 0 | 3 | 0 | 2 | 0 | 0 | 1 | 8 |
| Northern Ontario (McKnight) | 1 | 0 | 0 | 1 | 0 | 2 | 0 | 2 | 0 | 0 | 6 |

| Sheet B | 1 | 2 | 3 | 4 | 5 | 6 | 7 | 8 | 9 | 10 | Final |
|---|---|---|---|---|---|---|---|---|---|---|---|
| Northwest Territories/Yukon (Delmage) 🔨 | 0 | 0 | 0 | 1 | 0 | 0 | 0 | 1 | X | X | 2 |
| Saskatchewan (Bryden) | 2 | 1 | 2 | 0 | 2 | 1 | 3 | 0 | X | X | 11 |

| Sheet C | 1 | 2 | 3 | 4 | 5 | 6 | 7 | 8 | 9 | 10 | Final |
|---|---|---|---|---|---|---|---|---|---|---|---|
| Nova Scotia (Kamp) 🔨 | 0 | 1 | 0 | 0 | 0 | 0 | 0 | 1 | X | X | 2 |
| Manitoba (Riley) | 1 | 0 | 2 | 1 | 0 | 1 | 2 | 0 | X | X | 7 |

| Sheet D | 1 | 2 | 3 | 4 | 5 | 6 | 7 | 8 | 9 | 10 | Final |
|---|---|---|---|---|---|---|---|---|---|---|---|
| Ontario (Werenich) 🔨 | 0 | 0 | 0 | 2 | 3 | 0 | 0 | 3 | 0 | X | 8 |
| Newfoundland (Thomas) | 0 | 0 | 1 | 0 | 0 | 1 | 1 | 0 | 2 | X | 5 |

| Sheet E | 1 | 2 | 3 | 4 | 5 | 6 | 7 | 8 | 9 | 10 | Final |
|---|---|---|---|---|---|---|---|---|---|---|---|
| Quebec (Pacquin) 🔨 | 0 | 0 | 0 | 0 | 2 | 0 | 0 | 1 | 0 | X | 3 |
| British Columbia (Sparkes) | 0 | 0 | 0 | 3 | 0 | 1 | 0 | 0 | 2 | X | 6 |

=== Draw 9 ===
| Sheet C | 1 | 2 | 3 | 4 | 5 | 6 | 7 | 8 | 9 | 10 | Final |
|---|---|---|---|---|---|---|---|---|---|---|---|
| Prince Edward Island (Matheson) 🔨 | 1 | 0 | 1 | 0 | 1 | 0 | 0 | 2 | 0 | X | 5 |
| Saskatchewan (Bryden) | 0 | 1 | 0 | 2 | 0 | 1 | 0 | 0 | 3 | X | 7 |

| Sheet D | 1 | 2 | 3 | 4 | 5 | 6 | 7 | 8 | 9 | 10 | Final |
|---|---|---|---|---|---|---|---|---|---|---|---|
| Nova Scotia (Kamp) 🔨 | 1 | 1 | 2 | 0 | 0 | 0 | 0 | 1 | 0 | X | 5 |
| Northern Ontario (McKnight) | 0 | 0 | 0 | 3 | 1 | 1 | 2 | 0 | 2 | X | 9 |

=== Draw 10 ===
| Sheet A | 1 | 2 | 3 | 4 | 5 | 6 | 7 | 8 | 9 | 10 | Final |
|---|---|---|---|---|---|---|---|---|---|---|---|
| Northwest Territories/Yukon (Delmage) 🔨 | 0 | 1 | 0 | 0 | 1 | 0 | 2 | 0 | 0 | X | 4 |
| Ontario (Werenich) | 2 | 0 | 2 | 1 | 0 | 1 | 0 | 0 | 1 | X | 7 |

| Sheet B | 1 | 2 | 3 | 4 | 5 | 6 | 7 | 8 | 9 | 10 | Final |
|---|---|---|---|---|---|---|---|---|---|---|---|
| British Columbia (Sparkes) 🔨 | 2 | 0 | 0 | 0 | 3 | 0 | 0 | 2 | 0 | 0 | 7 |
| Manitoba (Riley) | 0 | 2 | 1 | 0 | 0 | 1 | 0 | 0 | 1 | 1 | 6 |

| Sheet C | 1 | 2 | 3 | 4 | 5 | 6 | 7 | 8 | 9 | 10 | Final |
|---|---|---|---|---|---|---|---|---|---|---|---|
| New Brunswick (Dobson) 🔨 | 2 | 0 | 1 | 0 | 2 | 1 | 0 | 3 | 0 | X | 9 |
| Northern Ontario (McKnight) | 0 | 1 | 0 | 2 | 0 | 0 | 2 | 0 | 1 | X | 6 |

| Sheet D | 1 | 2 | 3 | 4 | 5 | 6 | 7 | 8 | 9 | 10 | Final |
|---|---|---|---|---|---|---|---|---|---|---|---|
| Quebec (Pacquin) 🔨 | 2 | 2 | 0 | 2 | 0 | 1 | 0 | 2 | 2 | X | 11 |
| Saskatchewan (Bryden) | 0 | 0 | 1 | 0 | 1 | 0 | 2 | 0 | 0 | X | 4 |

| Sheet E | 1 | 2 | 3 | 4 | 5 | 6 | 7 | 8 | 9 | 10 | Final |
|---|---|---|---|---|---|---|---|---|---|---|---|
| Alberta (Lukowich) 🔨 | 2 | 0 | 1 | 0 | 6 | 1 | 0 | 3 | X | X | 13 |
| Newfoundland (Thomas) | 0 | 1 | 0 | 1 | 0 | 0 | 2 | 0 | X | X | 4 |

=== Draw 11 ===
| Sheet A | 1 | 2 | 3 | 4 | 5 | 6 | 7 | 8 | 9 | 10 | Final |
|---|---|---|---|---|---|---|---|---|---|---|---|
| British Columbia (Sparkes) 🔨 | 0 | 0 | 2 | 1 | 0 | 1 | 0 | 0 | 2 | 0 | 6 |
| Newfoundland (Thomas) | 1 | 1 | 0 | 0 | 2 | 0 | 2 | 1 | 0 | 2 | 9 |

| Sheet B | 1 | 2 | 3 | 4 | 5 | 6 | 7 | 8 | 9 | 10 | Final |
|---|---|---|---|---|---|---|---|---|---|---|---|
| Nova Scotia (Kamp) 🔨 | 1 | 0 | 1 | 0 | 1 | 0 | 1 | 1 | 0 | 2 | 7 |
| Quebec (Pacquin) | 0 | 1 | 0 | 1 | 0 | 1 | 0 | 0 | 2 | 0 | 5 |

| Sheet C | 1 | 2 | 3 | 4 | 5 | 6 | 7 | 8 | 9 | 10 | Final |
|---|---|---|---|---|---|---|---|---|---|---|---|
| Manitoba (Riley) 🔨 | 0 | 3 | 1 | 0 | 0 | 4 | 0 | 1 | 0 | X | 9 |
| Alberta (Lukowich) | 0 | 0 | 0 | 1 | 1 | 0 | 1 | 0 | 1 | X | 4 |

| Sheet D | 1 | 2 | 3 | 4 | 5 | 6 | 7 | 8 | 9 | 10 | Final |
|---|---|---|---|---|---|---|---|---|---|---|---|
| Prince Edward Island (Matheson) 🔨 | 0 | 0 | 0 | 1 | 0 | 1 | 0 | 0 | 0 | X | 2 |
| Ontario (Werenich) | 1 | 1 | 1 | 0 | 0 | 0 | 0 | 3 | 1 | X | 7 |

| Sheet E | 1 | 2 | 3 | 4 | 5 | 6 | 7 | 8 | 9 | 10 | Final |
|---|---|---|---|---|---|---|---|---|---|---|---|
| Northwest Territories/Yukon (Delmage) 🔨 | 0 | 1 | 0 | 2 | 0 | 1 | 0 | 0 | 1 | 0 | 5 |
| New Brunswick (Dobson) | 0 | 0 | 2 | 0 | 3 | 0 | 0 | 1 | 0 | 1 | 7 |

=== Draw 12 ===
| Sheet A | 1 | 2 | 3 | 4 | 5 | 6 | 7 | 8 | 9 | 10 | 11 | Final |
|---|---|---|---|---|---|---|---|---|---|---|---|---|
| New Brunswick (Dobson) 🔨 | 1 | 0 | 1 | 0 | 1 | 2 | 0 | 0 | 0 | 2 | 0 | 7 |
| Nova Scotia (Kamp) | 0 | 1 | 0 | 2 | 0 | 0 | 3 | 1 | 0 | 0 | 2 | 9 |

| Sheet B | 1 | 2 | 3 | 4 | 5 | 6 | 7 | 8 | 9 | 10 | Final |
|---|---|---|---|---|---|---|---|---|---|---|---|
| Northern Ontario (McKnight) 🔨 | 3 | 0 | 0 | 2 | 0 | 1 | 0 | 1 | 0 | X | 7 |
| Northwest Territories/Yukon (Delmage) | 0 | 3 | 0 | 0 | 1 | 0 | 1 | 0 | 0 | X | 5 |

| Sheet C | 1 | 2 | 3 | 4 | 5 | 6 | 7 | 8 | 9 | 10 | Final |
|---|---|---|---|---|---|---|---|---|---|---|---|
| British Columbia (Sparkes) 🔨 | 1 | 0 | 0 | 3 | 0 | 1 | 0 | 2 | 2 | X | 9 |
| Prince Edward Island (Matheson) | 0 | 1 | 0 | 0 | 1 | 0 | 1 | 0 | 0 | X | 3 |

| Sheet D | 1 | 2 | 3 | 4 | 5 | 6 | 7 | 8 | 9 | 10 | Final |
|---|---|---|---|---|---|---|---|---|---|---|---|
| Saskatchewan (Bryden) 🔨 | 0 | 0 | 1 | 0 | 2 | 0 | 2 | 0 | 0 | 0 | 5 |
| Alberta (Lukowich) | 3 | 0 | 0 | 1 | 0 | 2 | 0 | 0 | 1 | 2 | 9 |

| Sheet E | 1 | 2 | 3 | 4 | 5 | 6 | 7 | 8 | 9 | 10 | Final |
|---|---|---|---|---|---|---|---|---|---|---|---|
| Manitoba (Riley) 🔨 | 0 | 1 | 1 | 0 | 1 | 2 | 0 | 2 | 0 | X | 7 |
| Ontario (Werenich) | 1 | 0 | 0 | 1 | 0 | 0 | 1 | 0 | 1 | X | 4 |

=== Draw 13 ===
| Sheet A | 1 | 2 | 3 | 4 | 5 | 6 | 7 | 8 | 9 | 10 | 11 | Final |
|---|---|---|---|---|---|---|---|---|---|---|---|---|
| Alberta (Lukowich) 🔨 | 0 | 0 | 1 | 0 | 1 | 1 | 1 | 0 | 1 | 0 | 1 | 6 |
| Prince Edward Island (Matheson) | 0 | 0 | 0 | 3 | 0 | 0 | 0 | 1 | 0 | 1 | 0 | 5 |

| Sheet B | 1 | 2 | 3 | 4 | 5 | 6 | 7 | 8 | 9 | 10 | Final |
|---|---|---|---|---|---|---|---|---|---|---|---|
| Ontario (Werenich) 🔨 | 0 | 1 | 0 | 2 | 1 | 0 | 1 | 0 | 3 | X | 8 |
| Quebec (Pacquin) | 2 | 0 | 2 | 0 | 0 | 1 | 0 | 1 | 0 | X | 6 |

| Sheet C | 1 | 2 | 3 | 4 | 5 | 6 | 7 | 8 | 9 | 10 | Final |
|---|---|---|---|---|---|---|---|---|---|---|---|
| Saskatchewan (Bryden) 🔨 | 0 | 0 | 2 | 0 | 0 | 0 | 2 | 0 | 0 | 1 | 5 |
| New Brunswick (Dobson) | 0 | 1 | 0 | 1 | 0 | 0 | 0 | 2 | 0 | 0 | 4 |

| Sheet D | 1 | 2 | 3 | 4 | 5 | 6 | 7 | 8 | 9 | 10 | Final |
|---|---|---|---|---|---|---|---|---|---|---|---|
| Newfoundland (Thomas) 🔨 | 2 | 0 | 2 | 0 | 1 | 0 | 1 | 0 | 2 | 0 | 8 |
| Nova Scotia (Kamp) | 0 | 2 | 0 | 1 | 0 | 2 | 0 | 1 | 0 | 3 | 9 |

| Sheet E | 1 | 2 | 3 | 4 | 5 | 6 | 7 | 8 | 9 | 10 | Final |
|---|---|---|---|---|---|---|---|---|---|---|---|
| British Columbia (Sparkes) 🔨 | 0 | 0 | 1 | 0 | 0 | 1 | 0 | 1 | 0 | X | 3 |
| Ontario (Werenich) | 0 | 0 | 0 | 0 | 2 | 0 | 3 | 0 | 1 | X | 6 |

=== Draw 14 ===
| Sheet A | 1 | 2 | 3 | 4 | 5 | 6 | 7 | 8 | 9 | 10 | Final |
|---|---|---|---|---|---|---|---|---|---|---|---|
| Saskatchewan (Bryden) 🔨 | 1 | 0 | 0 | 1 | 0 | 0 | 1 | 0 | 2 | X | 5 |
| Manitoba (Riley) | 0 | 0 | 1 | 0 | 1 | 0 | 0 | 4 | 0 | X | 6 |

| Sheet B | 1 | 2 | 3 | 4 | 5 | 6 | 7 | 8 | 9 | 10 | Final |
|---|---|---|---|---|---|---|---|---|---|---|---|
| Northern Ontario (McKnight) 🔨 | 0 | 0 | 0 | 2 | 0 | 0 | 2 | 1 | 0 | X | 5 |
| Newfoundland (Thomas) | 3 | 1 | 3 | 0 | 0 | 2 | 0 | 0 | 2 | X | 11 |

| Sheet C | 1 | 2 | 3 | 4 | 5 | 6 | 7 | 8 | 9 | 10 | Final |
|---|---|---|---|---|---|---|---|---|---|---|---|
| Ontario (Werenich) 🔨 | 1 | 1 | 2 | 0 | 0 | 2 | 0 | 1 | 0 | X | 7 |
| Nova Scotia (Kamp) | 0 | 0 | 0 | 2 | 1 | 0 | 1 | 0 | 1 | X | 5 |

| Sheet D | 1 | 2 | 3 | 4 | 5 | 6 | 7 | 8 | 9 | 10 | Final |
|---|---|---|---|---|---|---|---|---|---|---|---|
| British Columbia (Sparkes) 🔨 | 0 | 0 | 0 | 0 | 1 | 1 | 0 | 1 | X | X | 3 |
| Northwest Territories/Yukon (Delmage) | 2 | 0 | 5 | 2 | 0 | 0 | 3 | 0 | X | X | 12 |

| Sheet E | 1 | 2 | 3 | 4 | 5 | 6 | 7 | 8 | 9 | 10 | Final |
|---|---|---|---|---|---|---|---|---|---|---|---|
| Prince Edward Island (Matheson) 🔨 | 2 | 0 | 0 | 0 | 0 | 2 | 2 | 0 | 2 | X | 8 |
| Quebec (Pacquin) | 0 | 1 | 2 | 0 | 1 | 0 | 0 | 2 | 0 | X | 6 |

=== Draw 15 ===
| Sheet A | 1 | 2 | 3 | 4 | 5 | 6 | 7 | 8 | 9 | 10 | 11 | Final |
|---|---|---|---|---|---|---|---|---|---|---|---|---|
| Northern Ontario (McKnight) 🔨 | 0 | 1 | 0 | 1 | 1 | 0 | 1 | 1 | 0 | 0 | 2 | 7 |
| Quebec (Pacquin) | 1 | 0 | 1 | 0 | 0 | 1 | 0 | 0 | 1 | 1 | 0 | 5 |

| Sheet B | 1 | 2 | 3 | 4 | 5 | 6 | 7 | 8 | 9 | 10 | Final |
|---|---|---|---|---|---|---|---|---|---|---|---|
| Manitoba (Riley) 🔨 | 1 | 1 | 1 | 1 | 3 | 0 | 0 | 1 | X | X | 8 |
| Prince Edward Island (Matheson) | 0 | 0 | 0 | 0 | 0 | 1 | 0 | 0 | X | X | 1 |

| Sheet C | 1 | 2 | 3 | 4 | 5 | 6 | 7 | 8 | 9 | 10 | Final |
|---|---|---|---|---|---|---|---|---|---|---|---|
| Newfoundland (Thomas) 🔨 | 1 | 1 | 0 | 0 | 0 | 0 | 1 | 0 | 1 | X | 4 |
| Northwest Territories/Yukon (Delmage) | 0 | 0 | 1 | 1 | 4 | 1 | 0 | 1 | 0 | X | 8 |

| Sheet D | 1 | 2 | 3 | 4 | 5 | 6 | 7 | 8 | 9 | 10 | Final |
|---|---|---|---|---|---|---|---|---|---|---|---|
| Alberta (Lukowich) 🔨 | 1 | 3 | 1 | 0 | 1 | 0 | 3 | 0 | X | X | 9 |
| New Brunswick (Dobson) | 0 | 0 | 0 | 2 | 0 | 1 | 0 | 1 | X | X | 4 |

| Sheet E | 1 | 2 | 3 | 4 | 5 | 6 | 7 | 8 | 9 | 10 | Final |
|---|---|---|---|---|---|---|---|---|---|---|---|
| Saskatchewan (Bryden) 🔨 | 0 | 2 | 1 | 0 | 0 | 0 | 3 | 2 | X | X | 8 |
| Nova Scotia (Kamp) | 1 | 0 | 0 | 1 | 0 | 0 | 0 | 0 | X | X | 2 |

== Tiebreakers ==
| Semifinals | | To Playoffs |
| | | Saskatchewan | 2 |
| Ontario | 8 | Ontario | 8 |
| New Brunswick | 4 |

=== Round 1 ===
| Sheet C | 1 | 2 | 3 | 4 | 5 | 6 | 7 | 8 | 9 | 10 | Final |
|---|---|---|---|---|---|---|---|---|---|---|---|
| Ontario (Werenich) 🔨 | 0 | 0 | 2 | 3 | 0 | 0 | 1 | 0 | 2 | X | 8 |
| New Brunswick (Dobson) | 0 | 1 | 0 | 0 | 0 | 1 | 0 | 2 | 0 | X | 4 |

Player percentages
| Ontario | | New Brunswick | |
|---|---|---|---|
| Neil Harrison | 92% | Claude Moore | 94% |
| John Kawaja | 65% | Michael Dobson | 75% |
| Paul Savage | 89% | Richard Belyea | 68% |
| Ed Werenich | 88% | Arnie Dobson | 68% |
| Total | 83% | Total | 76% |

=== Round 2 ===
| Sheet C | 1 | 2 | 3 | 4 | 5 | 6 | 7 | 8 | 9 | 10 | Final |
|---|---|---|---|---|---|---|---|---|---|---|---|
| Saskatchewan (Bryden) 🔨 | 1 | 0 | 1 | 0 | 0 | 0 | 0 | 0 | X | X | 2 |
| Ontario (Werenich) | 0 | 1 | 0 | 1 | 1 | 2 | 2 | 1 | X | X | 8 |

Player percentages
| Saskatchewan | | Ontario | |
|---|---|---|---|
| Jerry Zimmer | 77% | Neil Harrison | 67% |
| Wilf Foss | 77% | John Kawaja | 81% |
| Dale Graham | 88% | Paul Savage | 70% |
| Gary Bryden | 64% | Ed Werenich | 86% |
| Total | 76% | Total | 76% |

== Playoffs ==
| Semifinal | | | Final |
| | | | 1 | Manitoba | 7 |
| 2 | Alberta | 3 | 3 | Ontario | 4 |
| 3 | Ontario | 6 |

=== Semifinal ===
| Sheet C | 1 | 2 | 3 | 4 | 5 | 6 | 7 | 8 | 9 | 10 | Final |
|---|---|---|---|---|---|---|---|---|---|---|---|
| Alberta (Lukowich) 🔨 | 2 | 0 | 0 | 1 | 0 | 0 | 0 | 0 | 0 | X | 3 |
| Ontario (Werenich) | 0 | 0 | 3 | 0 | 0 | 1 | 0 | 2 | 0 | X | 6 |

Player percentages
| Alberta | | Ontario | |
|---|---|---|---|
| Brent Syme | 75% | Neil Harrison | 85% |
| Neil Houston | 61% | John Kawaja | 81% |
| John Ferguson | 84% | Paul Savage | 92% |
| Ed Lukowich | 71% | Ed Werenich | 83% |
| Total | 73% | Total | 85% |

=== Final ===
| Sheet C | 1 | 2 | 3 | 4 | 5 | 6 | 7 | 8 | 9 | 10 | Final |
|---|---|---|---|---|---|---|---|---|---|---|---|
| Manitoba (Riley) | 0 | 1 | 2 | 1 | 0 | 1 | 0 | 2 | 0 | X | 7 |
| Ontario (Werenich) 🔨 | 1 | 0 | 0 | 0 | 1 | 0 | 1 | 0 | 1 | X | 4 |

Player percentages
| Manitoba | | Ontario | |
|---|---|---|---|
| Russ Wookey | 83% | Neil Harrison | 84% |
| John Helston | 78% | John Kawaja | 94% |
| Brian Toews | 98% | Paul Savage | 75% |
| Mike Riley | 86% | Ed Werenich | 76% |
| Total | 86% | Total | 85% |

== Statistics ==
=== Top 5 player percentages ===
Round Robin only

| Leads | % |
|---|---|
| (Ontario) Neil Harrison | 81 |
| (Alberta) Brent Syme | 81 |
| (Saskatchewan) Jerry Zimmer | 81 |
| (Manitoba) Russ Wookey | 78 |
| (Nova Scotia) Haylett Clarke | 76 |
| (Quebec) Neil Millard | 76 |

| Seconds | % |
|---|---|
| (Saskatchewan) Wilf Foss | 82 |
| (Manitoba) John Helston | 77 |
| (Prince Edward Island) Allan Ledgerwood | 76 |
| (Ontario) John Kawaja | 76 |
| (Northern Ontario) Brian Carr | 76 |

| Thirds | % |
|---|---|
| (Saskatchewan) Dale Graham | 79 |
| (Alberta) John Ferguson | 78 |
| (Ontario) Paul Savage | 76 |
| (Manitoba) Brian Toews | 74 |
| (Nova Scotia) Vic Langille | 73 |

| Skips | % |
|---|---|
| (Alberta) Ed Lukowich | 76 |
| (Manitoba) Mike Riley | 75 |
| (Ontario) Ed Werenich | 75 |
| (Saskatchewan) Gary Bryden | 74 |
| (Quebec) Rolland Pacquin | 72 |
