= 1998 Canadian Senior Curling Championships =

- Host city: Sault Ste. Marie, Ontario
- Arena: Soo Curlers Association
- Dates: February 7–15, 1998
- Men's winner: Saskatchewan
- Skip: Gary Bryden
- Third: Dale Graham
- Second: Wilf Foss
- Lead: Jerry Zimmer
- Finalist: Manitoba
- Women's winner: Ontario
- Skip: Jill Greenwood
- Third: Yvonne Smith
- Second: Gloria Campbell
- Lead: Vicki Lauder
- Finalist: Quebec

The 1998 CIBC Canadian Senior Curling Championships were held February 7 to 15 at the Soo Curlers Association in Sault Ste. Marie, Ontario.

== Men's ==
=== Teams ===
Province / Territory	Skip	Third	Second	Lead
Yukon/Northwest Territories	Gerry Miller	Allan Gee	Clarence Jack	Dwayne Backstrom
British Columbia	Dale McKenzie	Roy Giles	Sheldon Paulger	Marvin Wagner
Alberta	Ed Granger	Don Scheidegger	Mike Soroka	Barrie Lewis
Saskatchewan	Gary Bryden	Dale Graham	Wilf Foss	Jerry Zimmer
Manitoba	Clare DeBlonde	Brian Toews	John Helston	Garry DeBlonde
Northern Ontario	Wayne Lowe	Gerry Cantin	Don Moseley-Williams	Jack Lockhart
Ontario	Jim Sharples	Art Lobel	Brian Longley	Joe Gurowka
Quebec	Henri Gervais	Remi Belanger	Jean-Marie Allard	Claude Noel
New Brunswick	LeRoy McGinn	Walter Steeves	Brent Alward	Eric Surette
Nova Scotia	Richard Belyea	Donald Green	John Rowe	Sean Callaghan
Prince Edward Island	Jim Trainor	Barrie Stevenson	John McKay	Bill Atkinson
Newfoundland	Dennis Byrne	Fred Stagg	Cyril Alexander	Barry Lomond

=== Standings ===
Locale	Skip	W	L
Saskatchewan	Gary Bryden	9	2
Manitoba	Clare DeBlonde	9	2
Ontario	Jim Sharples	8	3
British Columbia	Dale McKenzie	7	4
Northern Ontario	Wayne Lowe	7	4
Nova Scotia	Richard Belyea	6	5
Alberta	Ed Granger	6	5
Prince Edward Island	Jim Trainor	4	7
Newfoundland	Dennis Byrne	4	7
New Brunswick	LeRoy McGinn	4	7
Quebec	Henri Gervais	1	10
Yukon/Northwest Territories	Gerry Miller	1	10

=== Results ===
==== Draw 1 ====
Sheet B	1	2	3	4	5	6	7	8	9	10	Final
Nova Scotia (Belyea)	1	1	0	1	1	0	0	2	0	0	6
New Brunswick (McGinn)	0	0	1	0	0	2	1	0	2	1	7

Sheet D	1	2	3	4	5	6	7	8	9	10	Final
Saskatchewan (Bryden)	0	1	0	1	0	1	0	0	2	2	7
Alberta (Granger)	0	0	2	0	1	0	0	2	0	0	4

Sheet F	1	2	3	4	5	6	7	8	9	10	Final
British Columbia (McKenzie)	0	3	1	0	2	0	2	0	2	X	10
Quebec (Gervais)	0	0	0	1	0	2	0	2	0	X	5

==== Draw 2 ====
Sheet A	1	2	3	4	5	6	7	8	9	10	11	Final
Ontario (Sharples)	0	0	0	1	0	2	0	0	1	0	0	4
Northern Ontario (Lowe)	0	0	1	0	1	0	0	1	0	1	1	5

Sheet C	1	2	3	4	5	6	7	8	9	10	Final
Newfoundland (Byrne)	0	0	1	0	0	0	0	0	0	X	1
Manitoba (DeBlonde)	2	0	0	2	0	1	0	1	1	X	7

Sheet E	1	2	3	4	5	6	7	8	9	10	Final
Yukon/Northwest Territories (Miller)	2	0	1	0	0	1	0	0	3	X	7
Prince Edward Island (Trainor)	0	3	0	0	3	0	1	2	0	X	9

==== Draw 3 ====
Sheet A	1	2	3	4	5	6	7	8	9	10	Final
New Brunswick (McGinn)	1	2	0	0	1	0	0	2	1	X	7
Yukon/Northwest Territories (Miller)	0	0	1	1	0	1	0	0	0	X	3

Sheet C	1	2	3	4	5	6	7	8	9	10	Final
Ontario (Sharples)	1	0	0	0	0	1	1	0	1	1	5
British Columbia (McKenzie)	0	2	0	0	0	0	0	1	0	0	3

Sheet E	1	2	3	4	5	6	7	8	9	10	11	Final
Newfoundland (Byrne)	0	0	1	0	2	0	0	1	0	2	0	6
Alberta (Granger)	1	0	0	1	0	2	0	0	2	0	1	7

==== Draw 4 ====
Sheet B	1	2	3	4	5	6	7	8	9	10	Final
Nova Scotia (Belyea)	2	0	1	0	0	2	1	0	0	X	6
Prince Edward Island (Trainor)	0	1	0	0	0	0	0	1	1	X	3

Sheet D	1	2	3	4	5	6	7	8	9	10	Final
Northern Ontario (Lowe)	2	0	2	0	0	1	0	1	0	0	6
Quebec (Gervais)	0	2	0	0	0	0	3	0	0	0	5

Sheet F	1	2	3	4	5	6	7	8	9	10	Final
Saskatchewan (Bryden)	1	0	0	3	0	2	0	4	X	X	10
New Brunswick (McGinn)	0	0	1	0	2	0	1	0	X	X	4

==== Draw 5 ====
Sheet A	1	2	3	4	5	6	7	8	9	10	Final
Alberta (Granger)	1	0	1	0	2	0	1	0	2	X	7
Nova Scotia (Belyea)	0	2	0	2	0	1	0	3	0	X	8

Sheet C	1	2	3	4	5	6	7	8	9	10	11	Final
Manitoba (DeBlonde)	0	1	1	0	1	0	0	1	0	1	0	5
Saskatchewan (Bryden)	0	0	0	3	0	0	1	0	1	0	1	6

Sheet E	1	2	3	4	5	6	7	8	9	10	Final
Prince Edward Island (Trainor)	0	0	1	0	0	0	X	X	X	X	1
Ontario (Sharples)	0	0	0	4	1	3	X	X	X	X	8

==== Draw 6 ====
Sheet B	1	2	3	4	5	6	7	8	9	10	Final
Quebec (Gervais)	1	0	1	0	2	0	1	0	1	1	7
Newfoundland (Byrne)	0	4	0	1	0	2	0	1	0	0	8

Sheet D	1	2	3	4	5	6	7	8	9	10	11	Final
British Columbia (McKenzie)	1	0	1	0	0	0	0	1	0	2	0	5
Manitoba (DeBlonde)	0	1	0	0	0	2	1	0	1	0	1	6

Sheet F	1	2	3	4	5	6	7	8	9	10	Final
Yukon/Northwest Territories (Miller)	2	0	0	0	2	0	0	1	0	0	5
Northern Ontario (Lowe)	0	1	0	1	0	0	1	0	2	3	8

==== Draw 7 ====
Sheet A	1	2	3	4	5	6	7	8	9	10	Final
British Columbia (McKenzie)	0	2	3	1	0	0	0	0	0	1	7
Alberta (Granger)	0	0	0	0	0	1	1	1	1	0	4

Sheet C	1	2	3	4	5	6	7	8	9	10	Final
Newfoundland (Byrne)	2	2	1	1	1	0	4	X	X	X	11
New Brunswick (McGinn)	0	0	0	0	0	2	0	X	X	X	2

Sheet E	1	2	3	4	5	6	7	8	9	10	Final
Quebec (Gervais)	2	0	0	0	1	0	1	0	1	0	5
Saskatchewan (Bryden)	0	2	1	0	0	2	0	2	0	1	8

==== Draw 8 ====
Sheet B	1	2	3	4	5	6	7	8	9	10	Final
Alberta (Granger)	1	0	0	0	2	0	1	0	2	2	8
Yukon/Northwest Territories (Miller)	0	1	0	1	0	2	0	1	0	0	5

Sheet D	1	2	3	4	5	6	7	8	9	10	Final
New Brunswick (McGinn)	1	0	1	0	0	2	0	1	0	X	5
Ontario (Sharples)	0	0	0	4	1	0	1	0	1	X	7

Sheet F	1	2	3	4	5	6	7	8	9	10	Final
Manitoba (DeBlonde)	1	0	0	3	1	0	0	1	0	1	7
Nova Scotia (Belyea)	0	1	0	0	0	2	1	0	1	0	5

==== Draw 9 ====
Sheet A	1	2	3	4	5	6	7	8	9	10	11	Final
Saskatchewan (Bryden)	0	1	0	2	0	1	0	1	2	0	1	8
Prince Edward Island (Trainor)	0	0	3	0	2	0	1	0	0	1	0	7

Sheet C	1	2	3	4	5	6	7	8	9	10	Final
Nova Scotia (Belyea)	1	0	1	0	0	1	0	3	0	1	7
Northern Ontario (Lowe)	0	1	0	0	1	0	1	0	2	0	5

Sheet E	1	2	3	4	5	6	7	8	9	10	Final
Yukon/Northwest Territories (Miller)	1	0	0	1	0	0	1	0	0	0	3
British Columbia (McKenzie)	0	0	1	0	0	1	0	2	2	2	8

==== Draw 10 ====
Sheet B	1	2	3	4	5	6	7	8	9	10	Final
Northern Ontario (Lowe)	0	1	2	0	1	0	1	0	0	0	5
Manitoba (DeBlonde)	1	0	0	1	0	3	0	0	0	1	6

Sheet D	1	2	3	4	5	6	7	8	9	10	Final
Prince Edward Island (Trainor)	1	0	1	1	0	0	3	2	0	0	8
Quebec (Gervais)	0	2	0	0	1	0	0	0	3	0	6

Sheet F	1	2	3	4	5	6	7	8	9	10	Final
Ontario (Sharples)	1	0	0	0	1	0	0	0	0	1	3
Newfoundland (Byrne)	0	0	1	0	0	0	0	1	0	0	2

==== Draw 11 ====
Sheet A	1	2	3	4	5	6	7	8	9	10	Final
Prince Edward Island (Trainor)	0	0	1	0	0	1	1	0	0	X	3
Manitoba (DeBlonde)	0	0	0	4	1	0	0	1	2	X	8

Sheet B	1	2	3	4	5	6	7	8	9	10	Final
Ontario (Sharples)	1	2	1	0	3	0	1	0	0	X	8
Saskatchewan (Bryden)	0	0	0	1	0	1	0	2	1	X	5

Sheet C	1	2	3	4	5	6	7	8	9	10	Final
Northern Ontario (Lowe)	0	0	0	1	1	2	3	0	X	X	7
Alberta (Granger)	0	0	0	0	0	0	0	2	X	X	2

Sheet D	1	2	3	4	5	6	7	8	9	10	11	Final
Yukon/Northwest Territories (Miller)	1	0	1	0	0	0	3	0	0	1	0	6
Newfoundland (Byrne)	0	1	0	2	0	1	0	2	0	0	2	8

Sheet E	1	2	3	4	5	6	7	8	9	10	Final
New Brunswick (McGinn)	0	4	0	0	1	0	0	3	X	X	8
Quebec (Gervais)	0	0	0	1	0	1	1	0	X	X	3

Sheet F	1	2	3	4	5	6	7	8	9	10	Final
Nova Scotia (Belyea)	2	0	1	0	2	0	0	2	0	2	9
British Columbia (McKenzie)	0	1	0	1	0	1	1	0	2	0	6

==== Draw 12 ====
Sheet A	1	2	3	4	5	6	7	8	9	10	Final
British Columbia (McKenzie)	1	0	2	0	2	3	0	4	X	X	12
New Brunswick (McGinn)	0	1	0	1	0	0	1	0	X	X	3

Sheet B	1	2	3	4	5	6	7	8	9	10	Final
Manitoba (DeBlonde)	0	1	0	1	0	2	0	0	0	0	4
Yukon/Northwest Territories (Miller)	0	0	1	0	1	0	0	1	0	0	3

Sheet C	1	2	3	4	5	6	7	8	9	10	Final
Quebec (Gervais)	1	0	0	2	0	1	0	1	0	0	5
Nova Scotia (Belyea)	0	2	0	0	2	0	0	0	2	0	6

Sheet D	1	2	3	4	5	6	7	8	9	10	Final
Saskatchewan (Bryden)	0	2	1	3	0	3	X	X	X	X	9
Northern Ontario (Lowe)	0	0	0	0	1	0	X	X	X	X	1

Sheet E	1	2	3	4	5	6	7	8	9	10	Final
Newfoundland (Byrne)	1	0	3	0	0	1	0	0	2	0	7
Prince Edward Island (Trainor)	0	1	0	2	3	0	0	1	0	1	8

Sheet F	1	2	3	4	5	6	7	8	9	10	Final
Alberta (Granger)	0	1	0	0	1	1	0	0	0	1	4
Ontario (Sharples)	0	0	0	1	0	0	1	0	0	0	2

==== Draw 13 ====
Sheet A	1	2	3	4	5	6	7	8	9	10	Final
Alberta (Granger)	3	0	2	1	0	2	0	4	X	X	12
Quebec (Gervais)	0	2	0	0	1	0	1	0	X	X	4

Sheet B	1	2	3	4	5	6	7	8	9	10	11	Final
Newfoundland (Byrne)	2	0	0	0	1	0	2	0	0	2	0	7
Northern Ontario (Lowe)	0	0	3	1	0	1	0	0	2	0	2	9

Sheet C	1	2	3	4	5	6	7	8	9	10	Final
British Columbia (McKenzie)	0	6	4	X	X	X	X	X	X	X	10
Prince Edward Island (Trainor)	0	0	0	X	X	X	X	X	X	X	0

Sheet D	1	2	3	4	5	6	7	8	9	10	11	Final
Ontario (Sharples)	1	0	1	0	1	0	1	0	1	0	1	6
Nova Scotia (Belyea)	0	0	0	2	0	1	0	1	0	1	0	5

Sheet E	1	2	3	4	5	6	7	8	9	10	Final
New Brunswick (McGinn)	2	1	0	3	1	0	1	0	1	X	9
Manitoba (DeBlonde)	0	0	1	0	0	2	0	2	0	X	5

Sheet F	1	2	3	4	5	6	7	8	9	10	Final
Yukon/Northwest Territories (Miller)	2	0	1	0	0	0	1	0	0	3	7
Saskatchewan (Bryden)	0	2	0	2	0	1	0	1	0	0	6

==== Draw 14 ====
Sheet A	1	2	3	4	5	6	7	8	9	10	Final
Nova Scotia (Belyea)	1	0	1	0	0	1	1	0	1	1	6
Newfoundland (Byrne)	0	1	0	2	1	0	0	3	0	0	7

Sheet B	1	2	3	4	5	6	7	8	9	10	Final
Saskatchewan (Bryden)	1	1	0	1	0	2	0	0	0	1	6
British Columbia (McKenzie)	0	0	1	0	2	0	1	0	1	0	5

Sheet C	1	2	3	4	5	6	7	8	9	10	Final
Manitoba (DeBlonde)	1	1	0	2	0	0	0	0	1	1	6
Ontario (Sharples)	0	0	2	0	2	0	0	0	0	0	4

Sheet D	1	2	3	4	5	6	7	8	9	10	Final
Quebec (Gervais)	2	0	1	0	1	1	0	1	0	1	7
Yukon/Northwest Territories (Miller)	0	1	0	2	0	0	2	0	1	0	6

Sheet E	1	2	3	4	5	6	7	8	9	10	11	Final
Northern Ontario (Lowe)	2	0	1	0	0	2	0	0	1	0	1	7
New Brunswick (McGinn)	0	2	0	1	0	0	1	0	0	2	0	6

Sheet F	1	2	3	4	5	6	7	8	9	10	Final
Prince Edward Island (Trainor)	1	0	2	0	0	0	2	0	1	0	6
Alberta (Granger)	0	3	0	1	2	1	0	1	0	1	9

==== Draw 15 ====
Sheet A	1	2	3	4	5	6	7	8	9	10	Final
Ontario (Sharples)	1	0	1	0	1	0	0	1	0	1	5
Yukon/Northwest Territories (Miller)	0	0	0	1	0	0	2	0	1	0	4

Sheet B	1	2	3	4	5	6	7	8	9	10	Final
New Brunswick (McGinn)	0	0	0	0	2	0	0	2	0	X	4
Alberta (Granger)	1	2	2	2	0	0	2	0	1	X	10

Sheet C	1	2	3	4	5	6	7	8	9	10	Final
Northern Ontario (Lowe)	1	1	0	0	1	0	2	0	2	X	7
Prince Edward Island (Trainor)	0	0	0	1	0	1	0	1	0	X	3

Sheet D	1	2	3	4	5	6	7	8	9	10	Final
Newfoundland (Byrne)	0	0	1	0	0	1	0	0	X	X	2
British Columbia (McKenzie)	0	0	0	1	1	0	3	4	X	X	9

Sheet E	1	2	3	4	5	6	7	8	9	10	11	Final
Nova Scotia (Belyea)	1	0	2	0	1	0	2	1	0	1	0	8
Saskatchewan (Bryden)	0	3	0	2	0	2	0	0	1	0	1	9

Sheet F	1	2	3	4	5	6	7	8	9	10	Final
Manitoba (DeBlonde)	0	1	0	1	0	2	0	1	0	0	5
Quebec (Gervais)	1	0	1	0	1	0	1	0	0	0	4

==== Draw 16 ====
Sheet A	1	2	3	4	5	6	7	8	9	10	Final
Saskatchewan (Bryden)	0	2	1	0	3	2	X	X	X	X	8
Newfoundland (Byrne)	0	0	0	1	0	0	X	X	X	X	1

Sheet B	1	2	3	4	5	6	7	8	9	10	Final
Quebec (Gervais)	0	1	1	0	1	0	0	0	1	X	4
Ontario (Sharples)	1	0	0	2	0	2	0	0	0	X	5

Sheet C	1	2	3	4	5	6	7	8	9	10	Final
Yukon/Northwest Territories (Miller)	2	0	0	1	0	0	0	1	0	X	4
Nova Scotia (Belyea)	0	2	0	0	2	1	0	0	2	X	7

Sheet D	1	2	3	4	5	6	7	8	9	10	Final
Prince Edward Island (Trainor)	3	0	2	0	0	2	1	0	3	X	11
New Brunswick (McGinn)	0	0	0	1	1	0	0	2	0	X	4

Sheet E	1	2	3	4	5	6	7	8	9	10	Final
Alberta (Granger)	0	1	0	1	0	0	1	0	1	0	4
Manitoba (DeBlonde)	0	0	1	0	0	0	0	2	0	2	5

Sheet F	1	2	3	4	5	6	7	8	9	10	Final
British Columbia (McKenzie)	0	1	1	0	2	0	1	0	2	0	7
Northern Ontario (Lowe)	0	0	0	1	0	2	0	2	0	1	6

=== Playoffs ===
Semifinal		Final
Manitoba	9
Ontario	5	Manitoba	7
		Saskatchewan	8

==== Semifinal ====
Sheet F	1	2	3	4	5	6	7	8	9	10	Final
Manitoba (DeBlonde)	1	0	0	2	0	4	0	2	0	X	9
Ontario (Sharples)	0	0	2	0	1	0	1	0	1	X	5

Player percentages
Manitoba		Ontario	
Garry DeBlonde	92%	Joe Gurowka	92%
John Helston	96%	Brian Longley	86%
Brian Toews	85%	Art Lobel	69%
Clare DeBlonde	88%	Jim Sharples	67%
Total	90%	Total	78%

==== Final ====
Sheet B	1	2	3	4	5	6	7	8	9	10	Final
Manitoba (DeBlonde)	0	3	0	1	0	1	0	1	1	0	7
Saskatchewan (Bryden)	2	0	1	0	1	0	3	0	0	1	8

Player percentages
Manitoba		Saskatchewan	
Garry DeBlonde	88%	Jerry Zimmer	80%
John Helston	81%	Wilf Foss	78%
Brian Toews	71%	Dale Graham	84%
Clare DeBlonde	70%	Gary Bryden	70%
Total	78%	Total	78%

== Women's ==
=== Teams ===
Province / Territory	Skip	Third	Second	Lead
Yukon/Northwest Territories	Madeline Boyd	Arla Repka	Margaret Duncan	Elizabeth Friesen
British Columbia	Dolores Adams	Gailya Wasylik	Joanne Learmonth	Elizabeth Karpluk
Alberta	Cordella Schwengler	Marj Stewart	Marilyn Bratton	Norah Eaves
Saskatchewan	Crystal Frisk	Nancy Kerr	Lorna Dopson	Gertie Pick
Manitoba	Elaine Anderson	Cheryl Orr	Myra Macoomb	Joan Ingram
Northern Ontario	Sheila Ross	Linda Anderson	Shirley Dewar	Raylene Dagastino
Ontario	Jill Greenwood	Yvonne Smith	Gloria Campbell	Vicki Lauder
Quebec	Agnes Charette	Martha Don	Lois Baines	Mary Anne Robertson
New Brunswick	Grace Donald	Diane Gallant	Constance Graham	Carol Patterson
Nova Scotia	Penny LaRocque	Sharon Horne	Ann Donaldson	Margaret Cameron
Prince Edward Island	Arleen Harris	Kaye MacFadyen	Joan Saulnier	Betty Matthews
Newfoundland	Sue Anne Bartlett	Shirley Manuel	Gertrude Peck	Elinor Udell

=== Standings ===
Locale	Skip	W	L
Ontario	Jill Greenwood	9	2
Quebec	Agnes Charette	9	2
Northern Ontario	Sheila Ross	8	3
Nova Scotia	Penny LaRocque	8	3
Saskatchewan	Crystal Frisk	7	4
New Brunswick	Grace Donald	7	4
Alberta	Cordella Schwengler	5	6
Newfoundland	Sue Anne Bartlett	4	7
British Columbia	Dolores Adams	4	7
Manitoba	Elaine Anderson	4	7
Prince Edward Island	Arleen Harris	1	10
Yukon/Northwest Territories	Madeline Boyd	0	11

=== Results ===
==== Draw 1 ====
Sheet A	1	2	3	4	5	6	7	8	9	10	11	Final
Saskatchewan (Frisk)	0	2	0	0	0	1	0	1	1	1	1	7
British Columbia (Adams)	0	0	2	1	1	0	2	0	0	0	0	6

Sheet C	1	2	3	4	5	6	7	8	9	10	Final
Manitoba (Anderson)	1	0	1	0	0	0	X	X	X	X	2
Ontario (Greenwood)	0	2	0	4	1	4	X	X	X	X	11

Sheet E	1	2	3	4	5	6	7	8	9	10	Final
Alberta (Schwengler)	1	0	0	1	0	0	0	0	2	X	4
Northern Ontario (Ross)	0	1	0	0	4	1	1	1	0	X	8

==== Draw 2 ====
Sheet B	1	2	3	4	5	6	7	8	9	10	Final
Nova Scotia (LaRocque)	0	2	0	3	1	2	0	4	X	X	12
Yukon/Northwest Territories (Boyd)	1	0	0	0	0	0	1	0	X	X	2

Sheet D	1	2	3	4	5	6	7	8	9	10	Final
Newfoundland (Bartlett)	0	1	0	1	0	0	0	2	1	0	5
New Brunswick (Donald)	2	0	2	0	1	1	1	0	0	1	8

Sheet F	1	2	3	4	5	6	7	8	9	10	Final
Quebec (Charette)	0	1	0	0	1	1	3	2	0	X	8
Prince Edward Island (Harris)	0	0	0	2	0	0	0	0	3	X	5

==== Draw 3 ====
Sheet B	1	2	3	4	5	6	7	8	9	10	Final
Newfoundland (Bartlett)	1	0	0	1	0	0	1	0	1	1	5
Ontario (Greenwood)	0	0	2	0	2	1	0	1	0	0	6

Sheet D	1	2	3	4	5	6	7	8	9	10	Final
Quebec (Charette)	1	2	1	1	3	0	X	X	X	X	8
Saskatchewan (Frisk)	0	0	0	0	0	1	X	X	X	X	1

Sheet F	1	2	3	4	5	6	7	8	9	10	Final
Northern Ontario (Ross)	1	0	2	0	0	1	1	0	1	1	7
Nova Scotia (LaRocque)	0	1	0	2	2	0	0	1	0	0	6

==== Draw 4 ====
Sheet A	1	2	3	4	5	6	7	8	9	10	Final
Manitoba (Anderson)	2	0	2	0	2	0	2	0	2	X	10
Northern Ontario (Ross)	0	1	0	4	0	1	0	1	0	X	7

Sheet C	1	2	3	4	5	6	7	8	9	10	Final
Prince Edward Island (Harris)	0	0	0	1	0	X	X	X	X	X	1
British Columbia (Adams)	4	1	1	0	4	X	X	X	X	X	10

Sheet E	1	2	3	4	5	6	7	8	9	10	Final
Alberta (Schwengler)	1	0	2	3	2	2	0	0	X	X	10
Yukon/Northwest Territories (Boyd)	0	2	0	0	0	0	1	1	X	X	4

==== Draw 5 ====
Sheet B	1	2	3	4	5	6	7	8	9	10	Final
Yukon/Northwest Territories (Boyd)	0	1	0	1	0	0	X	X	X	X	2
Quebec (Charette)	3	0	2	0	5	1	X	X	X	X	11

Sheet D	1	2	3	4	5	6	7	8	9	10	Final
New Brunswick (Donald)	0	2	1	1	0	1	1	2	2	X	10
Manitoba (Anderson)	1	0	0	0	1	0	0	0	0	X	2

Sheet F	1	2	3	4	5	6	7	8	9	10	11	Final
Ontario (Greenwood)	0	0	2	0	0	1	2	0	2	0	0	7
Alberta (Schwengler)	1	1	0	1	1	0	0	2	0	1	1	8

==== Draw 6 ====
Sheet A	1	2	3	4	5	6	7	8	9	10	Final
Nova Scotia (LaRocque)	0	1	2	1	1	0	2	0	1	X	8
Prince Edward Island (Harris)	1	0	0	0	0	3	0	1	0	X	5

Sheet C	1	2	3	4	5	6	7	8	9	10	Final
Saskatchewan (Frisk)	0	3	3	1	1	1	3	X	X	X	12
New Brunswick (Donald)	0	0	0	0	0	0	0	X	X	X	0

Sheet E	1	2	3	4	5	6	7	8	9	10	11	Final
British Columbia (Adams)	1	0	1	2	0	0	1	0	1	0	0	6
Newfoundland (Bartlett)	0	2	0	0	0	2	0	1	0	1	1	7

==== Draw 7 ====
Sheet B	1	2	3	4	5	6	7	8	9	10	Final
British Columbia (Adams)	1	0	4	0	3	0	1	1	0	X	10
Manitoba (Anderson)	0	1	0	1	0	2	0	0	2	X	6

Sheet D	1	2	3	4	5	6	7	8	9	10	11	Final
Newfoundland (Bartlett)	1	0	0	1	0	0	2	0	1	1	0	6
Northern Ontario (Ross)	0	1	1	0	1	1	0	2	0	0	2	8

Sheet F	1	2	3	4	5	6	7	8	9	10	Final
Saskatchewan (Frisk)	1	0	2	0	2	0	0	0	1	0	6
Ontario (Greenwood)	0	1	0	1	0	2	2	0	0	2	8

==== Draw 8 ====
Sheet A	1	2	3	4	5	6	7	8	9	10	Final
New Brunswick (Donald)	2	0	1	0	4	0	0	2	1	X	10
Alberta (Schwengler)	0	2	0	1	0	1	2	0	0	X	6

Sheet C	1	2	3	4	5	6	7	8	9	10	Final
Northern Ontario (Ross)	0	1	0	1	0	1	1	0	X	X	4
Quebec (Charette)	2	0	4	0	2	0	0	6	X	X	14

Sheet E	1	2	3	4	5	6	7	8	9	10	Final
Ontario (Greenwood)	0	1	0	0	1	3	0	0	3	X	8
Nova Scotia (LaRocque)	0	0	1	2	0	0	1	0	0	X	4

==== Draw 9 ====
Sheet B	1	2	3	4	5	6	7	8	9	10	Final
Nova Scotia (LaRocque)	0	2	2	0	2	1	0	0	1	X	8
Saskatchewan (Frisk)	1	0	0	1	0	0	1	1	0	X	4

Sheet D	1	2	3	4	5	6	7	8	9	10	Final
Alberta (Schwengler)	1	0	2	0	2	0	4	0	1	X	10
Prince Edward Island (Harris)	0	1	0	1	0	1	0	1	0	X	4

Sheet F	1	2	3	4	5	6	7	8	9	10	Final
Manitoba (Anderson)	1	0	3	0	2	2	2	1	X	X	11
Yukon/Northwest Territories (Boyd)	0	2	0	0	0	0	0	0	X	X	2

==== Draw 10 ====
Sheet A	1	2	3	4	5	6	7	8	9	10	Final
Quebec (Charette)	1	0	1	1	0	4	0	2	X	X	9
Newfoundland (Bartlett)	0	1	0	0	1	0	2	0	X	X	4

Sheet C	1	2	3	4	5	6	7	8	9	10	Final
Yukon/Northwest Territories (Boyd)	0	3	0	0	1	1	0	1	0	X	6
British Columbia (Adams)	2	0	4	1	0	0	2	0	1	X	10

Sheet E	1	2	3	4	5	6	7	8	9	10	Final
Prince Edward Island (Harris)	0	0	0	0	1	1	0	X	X	X	2
New Brunswick (Donald)	3	1	1	1	0	0	5	X	X	X	11

==== Draw 11 ====
Sheet A	1	2	3	4	5	6	7	8	9	10	Final
Alberta (Schwengler)	0	3	0	0	0	1	0	0	1	0	5
Saskatchewan (Frisk)	1	0	1	0	1	0	0	2	0	1	6

Sheet B	1	2	3	4	5	6	7	8	9	10	Final
Northern Ontario (Ross)	0	2	2	0	3	0	1	0	4	X	12
British Columbia (Adams)	0	0	0	1	0	3	0	2	0	X	6

Sheet C	1	2	3	4	5	6	7	8	9	10	Final
Nova Scotia (LaRocque)	1	0	0	0	1	1	2	0	2	X	7
Newfoundland (Bartlett)	0	0	0	1	0	0	0	1	0	X	2

Sheet D	1	2	3	4	5	6	7	8	9	10	Final
Prince Edward Island (Harris)	3	0	0	1	0	1	0	X	X	X	5
Ontario (Greenwood)	0	5	1	0	4	0	2	X	X	X	12

Sheet E	1	2	3	4	5	6	7	8	9	10	Final
Quebec (Charette)	2	0	2	1	1	0	0	1	1	X	8
Manitoba (Anderson)	0	1	0	0	0	1	1	0	0	X	3

Sheet F	1	2	3	4	5	6	7	8	9	10	Final
Yukon/Northwest Territories (Boyd)	2	0	0	0	0	1	0	0	X	X	3
New Brunswick (Donald)	0	3	1	3	3	0	2	1	X	X	13

==== Draw 12 ====
Sheet A	1	2	3	4	5	6	7	8	9	10	Final
Ontario (Greenwood)	0	0	0	0	1	1	1	0	0	2	5
Quebec (Charette)	0	1	0	0	0	0	0	1	2	0	4

Sheet B	1	2	3	4	5	6	7	8	9	10	Final
Newfoundland (Bartlett)	1	0	3	4	2	0	4	X	X	X	14
Yukon/Northwest Territories (Boyd)	0	2	0	0	0	3	0	X	X	X	5

Sheet C	1	2	3	4	5	6	7	8	9	10	Final
Manitoba (Anderson)	4	0	1	0	0	4	1	2	X	X	12
Prince Edward Island (Harris)	0	2	0	1	1	0	0	0	X	X	4

Sheet D	1	2	3	4	5	6	7	8	9	10	Final
British Columbia (Adams)	2	2	1	0	1	2	0	0	0	X	8
Alberta (Schwengler)	0	0	0	1	0	0	1	1	1	X	4

Sheet E	1	2	3	4	5	6	7	8	9	10	Final
New Brunswick (Donald)	1	0	0	1	0	0	2	1	0	0	5
Nova Scotia (LaRocque)	0	2	1	0	0	1	0	0	1	2	7

Sheet F	1	2	3	4	5	6	7	8	9	10	Final
Saskatchewan (Frisk)	0	0	0	0	0	0	0	2	0	X	2
Northern Ontario (Ross)	0	0	0	2	1	1	1	0	2	X	7

==== Draw 13 ====
Sheet A	1	2	3	4	5	6	7	8	9	10	Final
Nova Scotia (LaRocque)	2	0	2	0	2	0	3	1	X	X	10
Manitoba (Anderson)	0	1	0	1	0	1	0	0	X	X	3

Sheet B	1	2	3	4	5	6	7	8	9	10	Final
Northern Ontario (Ross)	1	1	0	1	0	2	0	2	1	X	8
New Brunswick (Donald)	0	0	2	0	1	0	1	0	0	X	4

Sheet C	1	2	3	4	5	6	7	8	9	10	Final
Quebec (Charette)	0	1	0	0	0	1	0	1	0	X	3
Alberta (Schwengler)	1	0	2	1	1	0	1	0	3	X	9

Sheet D	1	2	3	4	5	6	7	8	9	10	Final
Saskatchewan (Frisk)	1	0	2	0	2	0	4	1	X	X	10
Yukon/Northwest Territories (Boyd)	0	0	0	1	0	1	0	0	X	X	2

Sheet E	1	2	3	4	5	6	7	8	9	10	Final
Newfoundland (Bartlett)	0	3	3	1	0	1	3	0	1	X	12
Prince Edward Island (Harris)	1	0	0	0	3	0	0	2	0	X	6

Sheet F	1	2	3	4	5	6	7	8	9	10	Final
Ontario (Greenwood)	2	1	0	0	1	2	0	0	1	2	9
British Columbia (Adams)	0	0	1	0	0	0	2	1	0	0	4

==== Draw 14 ====
Sheet A	1	2	3	4	5	6	7	8	9	10	Final
Yukon/Northwest Territories (Boyd)	0	2	0	0	0	0	1	X	X	X	3
Ontario (Greenwood)	3	0	1	1	2	2	0	X	X	X	9

Sheet B	1	2	3	4	5	6	7	8	9	10	Final
Prince Edward Island (Harris)	0	2	0	0	1	0	0	0	X	X	3
Northern Ontario (Ross)	2	0	2	3	0	2	2	2	X	X	12

Sheet C	1	2	3	4	5	6	7	8	9	10	Final
British Columbia (Adams)	0	0	0	0	0	3	0	0	X	X	3
Nova Scotia (LaRocque)	1	3	1	2	1	0	2	0	X	X	10

Sheet D	1	2	3	4	5	6	7	8	9	10	Final
New Brunswick (Donald)	1	0	0	0	0	1	0	1	0	X	3
Quebec (Charette)	0	0	1	1	0	0	3	0	1	X	6

Sheet E	1	2	3	4	5	6	7	8	9	10	Final
Manitoba (Anderson)	1	0	0	1	0	0	0	X	X	X	2
Saskatchewan (Frisk)	0	0	4	0	2	2	2	X	X	X	10

Sheet F	1	2	3	4	5	6	7	8	9	10	Final
Alberta (Schwengler)	0	2	0	1	3	0	4	0	0	1	11
Newfoundland (Bartlett)	1	0	1	0	0	4	0	2	1	0	9

==== Draw 15 ====
Sheet A	1	2	3	4	5	6	7	8	9	10	Final
New Brunswick (Donald)	6	0	5	0	0	2	X	X	X	X	13
British Columbia (Adams)	0	2	0	1	1	0	X	X	X	X	4

Sheet B	1	2	3	4	5	6	7	8	9	10	Final
Alberta (Schwengler)	0	0	1	1	0	1	1	0	1	X	5
Manitoba (Anderson)	2	1	0	0	1	0	0	3	0	X	7

Sheet C	1	2	3	4	5	6	7	8	9	10	Final
Newfoundland (Bartlett)	1	0	1	0	1	0	2	0	X	X	5
Saskatchewan (Frisk)	0	3	0	2	0	3	0	4	X	X	12

Sheet D	1	2	3	4	5	6	7	8	9	10	Final
Prince Edward Island (Harris)	1	1	1	0	0	3	0	5	1	X	12
Yukon/Northwest Territories (Boyd)	0	0	0	4	1	0	2	0	0	X	7

Sheet E	1	2	3	4	5	6	7	8	9	10	Final
Northern Ontario (Ross)	2	0	0	0	2	0	1	0	2	0	7
Ontario (Greenwood)	0	1	1	2	0	1	0	1	0	2	8

Sheet F	1	2	3	4	5	6	7	8	9	10	Final
Quebec (Charette)	1	0	1	2	1	0	2	0	1	X	8
Nova Scotia (LaRocque)	0	1	0	0	0	2	0	1	0	X	4

==== Draw 16 ====
Sheet A	1	2	3	4	5	6	7	8	9	10	Final
Saskatchewan (Frisk)	3	1	0	5	0	1	0	1	X	X	11
Prince Edward Island (Harris)	0	0	3	0	1	0	1	0	X	X	5

Sheet B	1	2	3	4	5	6	7	8	9	10	Final
Ontario (Greenwood)	1	0	0	1	1	1	0	0	1	0	5
New Brunswick (Donald)	0	0	1	0	0	0	4	1	0	1	7

Sheet C	1	2	3	4	5	6	7	8	9	10	Final
Yukon/Northwest Territories (Boyd)	3	0	2	0	0	0	X	X	X	X	5
Northern Ontario (Ross)	0	4	0	6	1	3	X	X	X	X	14

Sheet D	1	2	3	4	5	6	7	8	9	10	Final
Nova Scotia (LaRocque)	1	2	0	3	1	0	4	0	X	X	11
Alberta (Schwengler)	0	0	2	0	0	2	0	1	X	X	5

Sheet E	1	2	3	4	5	6	7	8	9	10	Final
British Columbia (Adams)	0	2	0	1	2	1	0	0	1	0	7
Quebec (Charette)	2	0	3	0	0	0	2	1	0	1	9

Sheet F	1	2	3	4	5	6	7	8	9	10	Final
Manitoba (Anderson)	3	0	0	1	0	0	2	0	0	0	6
Newfoundland (Bartlett)	0	0	3	0	1	1	0	0	0	3	8

=== Playoffs ===
Tiebreaker		Semifinal		Final
Nova Scotia	6
Northern Ontario	5	Quebec	10
		Nova Scotia	5
				Quebec	2
				Ontario	9

==== Tiebreaker ====
Sheet F	1	2	3	4	5	6	7	8	9	10	Final
Nova Scotia (LaRocque)	0	0	1	1	0	1	0	2	0	1	6
Northern Ontario (Ross)	0	1	0	0	1	0	1	0	2	0	5

Player percentages
Nova Scotia		Northern Ontario	
Margaret Cameron	71%	Raylene Dagastino	74%
Ann Donaldson	76%	Shirley Dewar	59%
Sharon Horne	85%	Linda Anderson	76%
Penny LaRocque	84%	Sheila Ross	82%
Total	79%	Total	72%

==== Semifinal ====
Sheet E	1	2	3	4	5	6	7	8	9	10	Final
Quebec (Charette)	2	2	0	2	0	0	3	0	1	X	10
Nova Scotia (LaRocque)	0	0	2	0	1	0	0	2	0	X	5

Player percentages
Quebec		Nova Scotia	
Mary Anne Robertson	81%	Margaret Cameron	94%
Lois Baines	92%	Ann Donaldson	96%
Martha Don	96%	Sharon Horne	81%
Agnes Charette	94%	Penny LaRocque	83%
Total	91%	Total	89%

==== Final ====
Sheet B	1	2	3	4	5	6	7	8	9	10	Final
Quebec (Charette)	0	0	1	0	1	0	0	0	0	X	2
Ontario (Greenwood)	1	0	0	3	0	2	1	1	1	X	9

Player percentages
Quebec		Ontario	
Mary Anne Robertson	79%	Vicki Lauder	67%
Lois Baines	75%	Gloria Campbell	82%
Martha Don	64%	Yvonne Smith	69%
Agnes Charette	72%	Jill Greenwood	93%
Total	73%	Total	78%
