= 1991 Canadian Senior Curling Championships =

The 1991 Canadian Senior Curling Championships, Canada's national championship for curlers over 50, were held March 9 to 16, 1991 at the Victoria Curling Club in Victoria, British Columbia.

In the men's final, Winnipeg's Jim Ursel rink, representing Manitoba defeated Al Delmage rink from the Territories, 6–5. Ursel and his team of Norm Houck, John Helston and Stan Lamont battled through quick ice conditions to claim victory, the second straight senior championship for the rink. They were helped in the ninth end when Delmage hit and stuck on a blank attempt, tying the game 5–5 without hammer in the last end. Delmage was all set up to steal in the 10th though, with a rock partially covered in the back of the four foot, but missed a guard attempt on his last shot. Ursel removed the shot rock to win the game.

In the women's final, Eila Brown from Thunder Bay, and her Northern Ontario team of Arline Wilson, Eileen Chivers-Wilson and Betty Lou Toskovich defeated Emily Farnham's Saskatoon rink representing Saskatchewan, 7–5. The team went undefeated at the tournament en route to the first Canadian Senior title for Northern Ontario. The team took a strong lead early on in the game, and held on to it after Fanrham missed an open hit for three in the sixth, which would have tied the game at 5, but instead gave up a steal of one. Saskatchewan missed a measurement in the 9th end, and were run out of rocks in the last end.

== Men's ==
=== Standings ===
Final round-robin standings.

Key
Teams to playoff
Teams to Tiebreaker

Locale	Skip	W	L
Manitoba	Jim Ursel	9	2
Saskatchewan	Benno Korte	8	3
Alberta	Bill Clark	7	4
Ontario	Bob Denney	7	4
British Columbia	Larry Wynn	7	4
Northwest Territories/Yukon	Al Delmage	7	4
Quebec	Dave Moon	5	6
New Brunswick	Dave Buckle	5	6
Nova Scotia	Barry Shearer	4	7
Prince Edward Island	Doug Cameron	3	8
Newfoundland	Dennis Byrne	2	9
Northern Ontario	Brian Carr	2	9

=== Tiebreakers ===
Team	1	2	3	4	5	6	7	8	9	10	Final
Ontario (Denney)	1	0	0	1	0	1	0	1	1	1	6
Alberta (Clark)	0	1	0	0	2	0	1	0	0	0	4

Team	1	2	3	4	5	6	7	8	9	10	Final
Northwest Territories/Yukon (Delmage)	2	0	3	0	2	0	2	0	X	X	9
British Columbia (Wynn)	0	1	0	2	0	1	0	0	X	X	4

Team	1	2	3	4	5	6	7	8	9	10	Final
Northwest Territories/Yukon (Delmage)	2	0	1	0	0	0	0	0	1	1	5
Ontario (Denney)	0	1	0	1	0	1	0	0	0	0	3

=== Playoffs ===
Semifinal		Final
Saskatchewan	3
Northwest Territories/Yukon	4	Manitoba	6
		Northwest Territories/Yukon	5

==== Semifinal ====
Team	1	2	3	4	5	6	7	8	9	10	Final
Saskatchewan (Korte)	0	1	0	0	0	0	0	1	1	X	3
Northwest Territories/Yukon (Delmage)	0	0	0	1	2	1	0	0	0	X	4

==== Final ====
Team	1	2	3	4	5	6	7	8	9	10	Final
Manitoba (Ursel)	0	1	0	0	3	0	1	0	0	1	6
Northwest Territories/Yukon (Delmage)	0	0	1	2	0	1	0	0	1	0	5

== Women's ==
=== Standings ===
Final round-robin standings.

Key
Teams to playoff

Locale	Skip	W	L
Northern Ontario	Eila Brown	11	0
Saskatchewan	Emily Farnham	9	2
Manitoba	Maxine Heritage	7	4
Alberta	Shirley Tucker	6	5
Nova Scotia	Jean Skinner	6	5
New Brunswick	Marlene Vaughan	6	5
Quebec	Joan McKay	5	6
Yukon/Northwest Territories	Shirley Morgan	4	7
British Columbia	Carmel Marshall	4	7
Prince Edward Island	Marie Gaudet	4	7
Ontario	Jean Beardsley	3	8
Newfoundland	Madeline Belbin	2	9

=== Playoffs ===
Semifinal		Final
Saskatchewan	9
Manitoba	5	Northern Ontario	7
		Saskatchewan	5

==== Semifinal ====
Team	1	2	3	4	5	6	7	8	9	10	Final
Saskatchewan (Farnham)	1	0	3	1	0	1	0	2	1	X	9
Manitoba (Heritage)	0	1	0	0	1	0	3	0	0	X	5

==== Final ====
Team	1	2	3	4	5	6	7	8	9	10	Final
Northern Ontario (Brown)	3	0	1	0	1	1	0	1	0	X	7
Saskatchewan (Farnham)	0	1	0	1	0	0	2	0	1	X	5
