= John Helston =

Canadian curler and curling coach

- Curler ♂
- Born: October 30, 1939 (age 87)

Team
- Curling club: Pembina CC, Winnipeg, MB

Curling career
- Member Association: Manitoba
- Brier: 1 (1984)
- World Championship: 1 (1984)
Medal record
Men's curling
Representing Manitoba
Labatt Brier
Gold medal – first place	1984 Victoria

John B. Helston (born October 30, 1939) is a Canadian curler and curling coach. He won the 1984 Brier playing second on the Mike Riley rink. He also won the 1991 Canadian Senior Curling Championships and the 2004 Canadian Masters Curling Championships, and was runner up at the 1998 Canadian Senior Curling Championships. He coached team Jennifer Jones at her first Hearts appearance in 2002.

At the time of the 1984 Brier, he was employed as a communications consultant for MTS. Helston was a member of the Riley rink until 1985 when he went to work in Saudi Arabia for a year.

== Awards ==
- Ross Harstone Sportsmanship Award: 1984.

== Teams ==
Season	Skip	Third	Second	Lead	Alternate	Events
1983–84	Mike Riley	Brian Toews	John Helston	Russ Wookey	Clare DeBlonde (Brier)	Brier 1984 (gold); WCC 1984 (4th)
1984–85	Mike Riley	Brian Toews	John Helston	Russ Wookey		
1990–91	Jim Ursel	Norm Houck	John Helston	Stan Lamont		CSCC 1991 (gold)
1993–94	Clare DeBlonde	Brian Toews	John Helston	Garry De Blonde		
1997–98	Dave Smith	Jonathan Mead	Peter Nicholls	Don Harvey	John Helston	COCT 1997 (7th)
1997–98	Clare DeBlonde	Brian Toews	John Helston	Garry De Blonde		CSCC 1998 (silver)
2003–04	Martin Bailey	John Helston	Brian Taylor	Gary Smith		CMaCC 2004 (gold)
2006–07	Martin Bailey	Les Cooper	John Helston	Bill Hodgson		CMaCC 2007

== Record as a coach of national teams ==
Year	Tournament, event	National team	Place
2008	2008 World Men's Curling Championship	Denmark (men)	9
2010	2010 World Junior Curling Championships	Denmark (junior men)	8
