= Jennifer Sadleir =

Canadian curler

- Curler
- Born: January 10, 1981 (age 45); Calgary, Alberta, Canada

Team
- Skip: Susan O'Connor
- Third: Jennifer Sadleir
- Second: Margo Weber
- Lead: Joanne Sipka

Curling career
- Top CTRS ranking: N/A
- Grand Slam victories: 0

Jennifer Sadleir (born Jennifer Vejprava on January 10, 1981 in Calgary, Alberta) is a Canadian curler. She previously played lead for Cheryl Bernard out of the Calgary Curling Club in Calgary.

== Curling career ==
=== 1997–2010 ===
Sadleir is a three time Alberta Junior Champion winning in 1998, 2000 and 2002. At the 2000 Canadian Juniors, playing as a second, her team finished the Canadian Junior Championship with a bronze medal. At the 2002 Canadian Junior Curling Championships, she would skip Alberta to a 7-5 round robin record, missing the playoffs. Sadleir would also participate in two Alberta Provincial Women’s Championships the first in 2003 and again in 2004. She has also played in two Alberta Mixed Championships in 2002 and 2004.

=== 2011–current ===
At the end of the 2010/2011 curling season Sadleir would join Calgary skip Cheryl Bernard as lead.

Sadleir was only with the Bernard team for one season

== Personal life ==
Sadleir is married and has a son and daughter.
