= Pembina Curling Club =

Premier curling rink in Winnipeg, Canada

- Interactive map of Pembina Curling Club
- Location: 1341 Pembina Highway; Winnipeg, Manitoba R3T 2B6; Canada; 49.8394°N 97.1538°W

Information
- Established: 1947
- Club type: Dedicated ice
- Curling Canada region: Curl Manitoba
- Sheets of ice: Six
- Website: https://pembinacc.com/

The Pembina Curling Club located in Winnipeg, Manitoba, is a six-sheet curling club located in the south part of the city. The club was established in 1947 by a group of Fort Garry residents in Winnipeg and led by Art Elders. The cinder block building was finished in 1952 despite curling taking place over the last five years. The current six-sheet facility was completed in 1965 and setback from the previous location beside the highway. Mike Riley curled out of the club when he won the 1984 Labatt Brier.

The Pembina Curling Club has a built in kitchen catered by SOL International Fusion Bistro.
