= Michael Riley (curler) =

Canadian curler (born 1955)

- Curler
- Born: April 16, 1955 (age 71)

Curling career
- Brier: 3 (1975, 1984, 1986)
- World Championship: 1 (1984)
Medal record
Men's curling
Representing Manitoba
Labatt Brier
Gold medal – first place	1984 Victoria

Michael C. "Mike" Riley (born April 16, 1955) is a Canadian curler originally from Winnipeg, Manitoba. He skipped his home province to a Brier championship in 1984.

== Career ==
Riley has been to three Briers. In 1975, he played third for Rod Hunter and at the Brier that year, they finished with a 6-5 record, tied for fifth place. Riley returned to the Brier in 1984, skipping a team of Brian Toews, John Helston and Russ Wookey. The team finished the round robin with an 8-3 record, in 1st place, which gave them a bye to the final against Ontario's Ed Werenich. The Manitoba four-some defeated "the Wrench" by a score of 7-4. The team would then go on to represent Canada at the 1984 Air Canada Silver Broom, the World Curling Championships. They would finish the round robin with a 6-3 record, but lost in the semi-final against Switzerland's Peter Attinger, Jr. This result placed them in 4th position.

Riley returned to the Brier in 1986 with team mates Toews, Wookey and new lead Terry Henry. The team finished the event with a 6-5 record, missing the playoffs.

Riley's 1984 team was inducted into the Manitoba Curling Hall of Fame in 2009.

== Personal life ==
As of 2009, Riley was living in Kelowna, British Columbia. When he won the Brier, he was an investment counsellor.
