= Eye on the Hog =

Curling hog line violation detection system

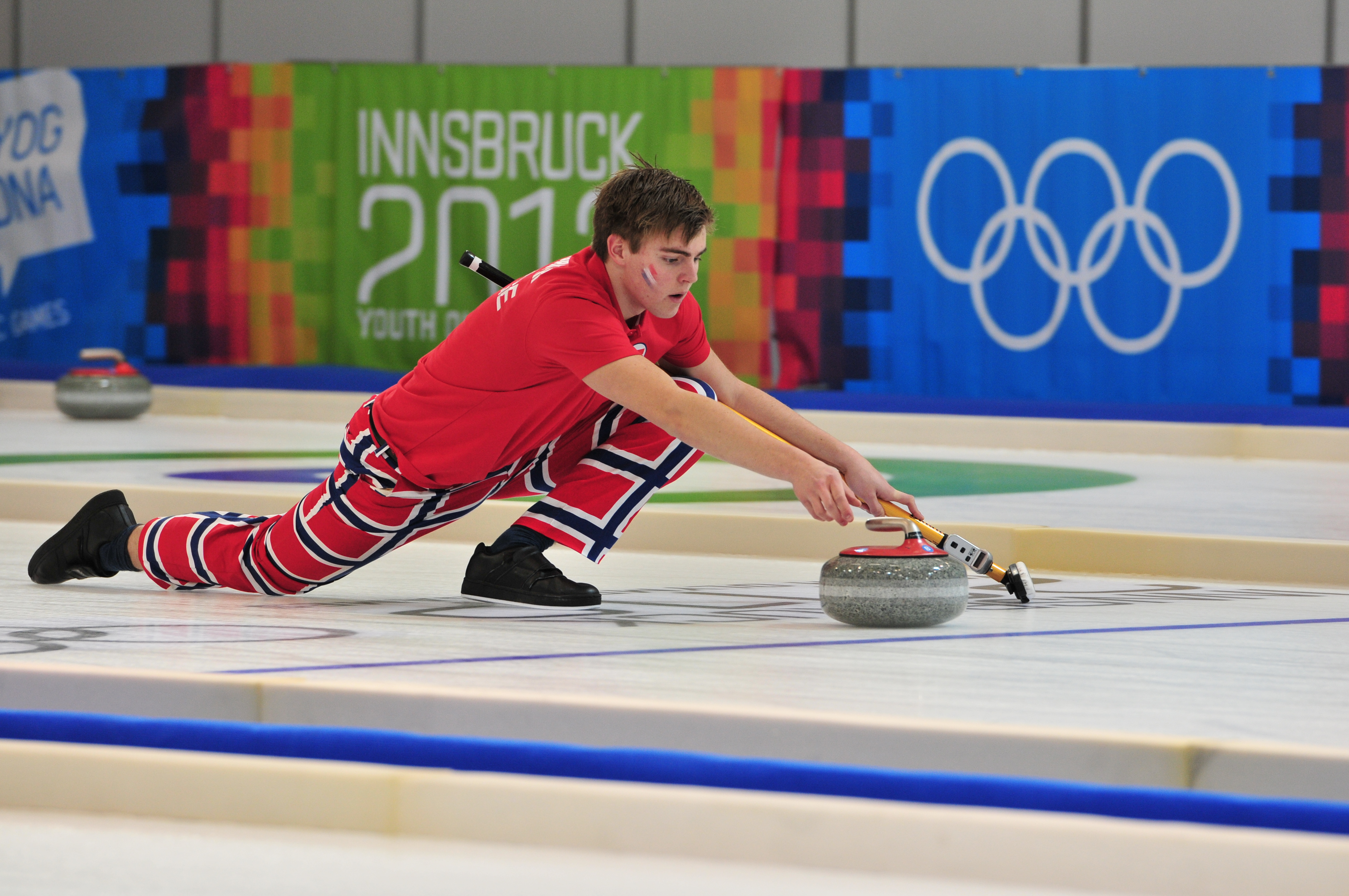
A curler releasing the stone just inches before it reaches the hog line. The Eye on the Hog can be identified by its tell-tale silver-coloured handle.

The Eye on the Hog is a sport officiating technology used in curling to electronically detect hog line violations. Commonly referred to as "sensor handles", it is based on a patent filed by University of Saskatchewan that was further developed by Startco Engineering, a company that was later acquired by Littelfuse.

== The rule ==
The rule governing hog line violations can be traced back to 1955. Ken Watson had developed the "long slide" delivery in the era when most curlers didn't slide much or barely even left the hack at all when delivering a curling stone. The then-controversial slide proved popular with youth curlers, notably Matt Baldwin and Stan Austman, who in the 1950s slid far down the sheet of ice as a gimmick.

Thus the rule was revised in 1955 to put some limit on the slide delivery, and it has evolved from curtailing it at the tee line, to limiting the slide up to the hog line (1961), to now requiring clear release by the time the stone reaches the hog line (1974). The penalty for a hog line violation is the removal of the delivered stone.

The first event where this rule was used was the 1974 Air Canada Silver Broom; the 1974 Macdonald Brier that preceded it was still played under the 1961 rule.

== Human enforcement ==
As in golf, the honour system played a key role in the enforcement of the rules of curling. However, the hog line rule was eventually enforced by the use of officials, similar to line judges in other sports. This was an immediate concern for the curlers, since visual enforcement is inherently error-prone, and the rule as written favors false positives as it put the onus on the curlers to remove all doubts that there was a violation.

In 1982, hog line officials in Canada were placed at an elevated position above ice level. Colleen Jones, who was penalized numerous times, disagreed that this provided them with the best view point to make their calls, and was almost suspended from the 1984 Scott Tournament of Hearts when she used mild vulgarity in a media interview. Canada started placing their officials at ice level in 1985.

Things did not improve at the 1986 Labatt Brier. Assisted by a physically imposing out-of-town "enforcer", hog line officials pulled 9 rocks in the first draw due to purported hog line violations, including 3 by Mel Bernard. There was further controversy involving Lyle Muyres, where films by an amateur filmmaker and a TV technician, though inadmissible as evidence, were examined.

There were also other incidents involving Paul Savage & Russ Howard at the semifinal of the Ontario Tankard provincial competition to qualify for 1987 Labatt Brier, Randy Ferbey at the 2001 World Men's Curling Championship, and Colleen Jones at 2002 World Women's Curling Championship.

== A technological solution ==
Neil Houston played a key role during the initial development of the sensor technology at University of Saskatchewan, and Canadian Curling Association (CCA) became the first adopter of the technology.

After testing at Sutherland Curling Club, the sensor handle finally made its high-profile debut at 2003 Continental Cup of Curling and CCA quickly committed to using them for future events.

Early on, curlers who insist on wearing gloves during delivery would still be judged by hog line officials, but eventually the rules prohibited the use of gloves to circumvent the sensor handles.

There were rumours that some Manitoba tuckers had to adjust their deliveries.

== Notable incidents ==
=== 2011 World Men's Curling Championship ===
Sebastian Kraupp and Pete Fenson

=== 2015 Tim Hortons Brier ===
Carter Rycroft

=== 2016 World Women's Curling Championship ===
Amy Nixon

=== 2018 Olympics ===
Eve Muirhead and Ma Jingyi

=== 2020 Scotties Tournament of Hearts ===
Emma Miskew
