= Jim Armstrong (curler) =

Canadian curler

- Curler
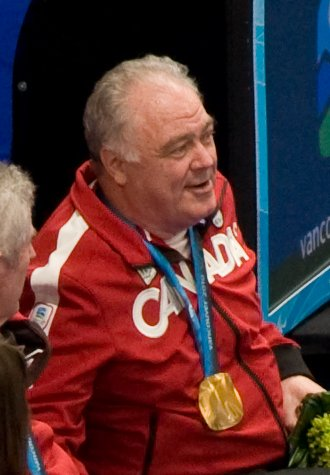
- Armstrong at the 2010 Winter Paralympics
- Born: June 30, 1950 (age 76); Victoria, British Columbia, Canada

Team
- Skip: Jim Armstrong
- Third: Collinda Joseph
- Second: Jonathon Thurston
- Lead: Reid Mulligan

Curling career
- Member Association: British Columbia; Ontario (since 2018)
- Brier: 6 (1973, 1974, 1983, 1984, 1987, 1992)
- World Wheelchair Championship: 3 (2009, 2011, 2013)
- Paralympic: 2 (2010, 2014)
Medal record
Men's curling
Representing British Columbia
The Brier
Silver medal – second place	1987 Edmonton
Bronze medal – third place	1974 London
Bronze medal – third place	1983 Sudbury
Wheelchair curling
Representing Canada
Paralympic Games
Gold medal – first place	2010 Vancouver
Gold medal – first place	2014 Sochi
World Championship
Gold medal – first place	2009 Vancouver
Gold medal – first place	2011 Prague
Gold medal – first place	2013 Sochi
Representing Ontario
Canadian Championship
Bronze medal – third place	2019 Boucherville
Representing British Columbia
Canadian Championship
Gold medal – first place	2009 Lower Sackville
Gold medal – first place	2008 Winnipeg

James P. Armstrong (born June 30, 1950) is a Canadian former curler and wheelchair curler now living in Ontario. He was a successful able-bodied curler for much of his career until he had to stop playing because of bad knees and a car accident in 2003.

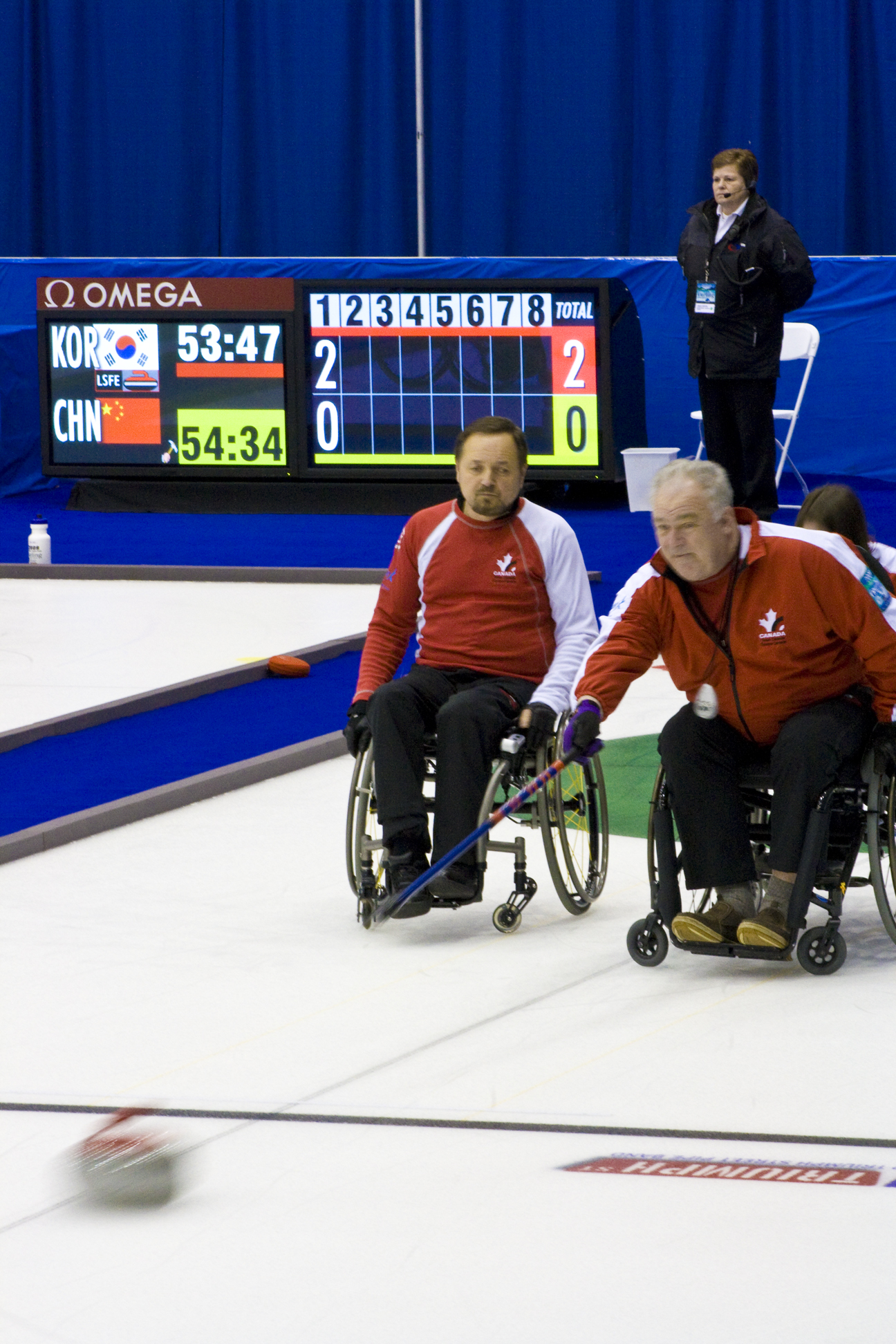
Chris Sobkowicz and Jim Armstrong at the 2009 World Wheelchair Curling Championship.

== Career ==
=== Curling career ===
Born in Victoria, British Columbia, Armstrong began curling at eight, and by the age of 22 he made his first Brier, playing second for British Columbia, skipped by Jack Tucker. The team finished 5–5 at that 1973 MacDonald Brier. Armstrong skipped B.C. in the following Brier, placing third with a 6–4 record.

Armstrong wouldn't make another Brier for 9 years, when he played third for Bernie Sparkes at the 1983 Labatt Brier. The team finished third once again, losing to Ontario's Ed Werenich in the semi-final. The team made the 1984 Labatt Brier in Victoria, but only finished 6–5. They made it back to the Brier in 1987, where they lost in the final to Ontario's Russ Howard. Armstrong played in his last Brier in 1992. Armstrong skipped the B.C. team to a 5–6 finish.

In 1990, he was inducted into the Canadian Curling Hall of Fame.

Armstrong won the Ross Hartstone Award at the 1983, 1987 and 1992 Briers for being the most sportsmanlike player as voted by the other athletes.

=== Wheelchair curling ===
In 2007 he was invited to rejoin the sport as an advisor to Team Canada's wheelchair curling program by Gerry Peckham, an ex-teammate and Canadian Curling Association's High Performance Director. He skipped BC to National Championship titles in 2008 and 2009, and in 2009 skipped Canada to their first World Wheelchair Curling Championship gold medal, a success he repeated at the 2010 Winter Paralympics, and the 2011 World Wheelchair Curling Championship in Prague. Armstrong travelled as skip with Team Canada to Chuncheon, South Korea for the 2012 World Wheelchair Curling Championship, but returned to Canada the day before the tournament began after receiving an 18 month ban for failing a doping test. After appealing to the Court of Arbitration for Sport (the "CAS"), Armstrong's ban was reduced to 6 months since "the WCF Panel did not properly exercise its discretion". Armstrong was represented at the CAS by Dr. Emir Crowne and Christina Khoury.

== Personal life ==
He worked as a dentist, until he sold his practice in 2003. He had first decided to take a year off to undergo bilateral knee replacement surgery. After the first knee was replaced, he had a car accident, where his recently repaired knee was slammed into the dashboard, and he had to have more surgeries on the replaced knee, as well as the scheduled surgery on the other knee. Over this period he could not work and had to sell his practice.

His wife of 29 years, died in September 2009. She had been diagnosed with cancer in 2005.

Armstrong and his son were arrested in April 2010 for trafficking counterfeit goods after he was accused of smuggling Chinese-made pills labeled Viagra and Cialis into Canada from Washington. His son would sell them in nightclubs, and said he had been selling such pills for three years. Armstrong pleaded guilty in October 2010 and had to pay a $30,000 fine as well as perform community service, while his son was "banned" from the University of B.C., and got one year and one day in jail.

Armstrong currently lives in Cambridge, Ontario.
