= Glossary of curling =

This is a glossary of terms in curling.

== # ==
Diagram that shows the number weight calling system as it relates to the ice surface. The tee line has been removed for clarity.

During a game, sweepers might call out numbers. These numbers indicate how far the sweepers think the rock in play will travel. This system is relatively new to the game and is often attributed to the Randy Ferbey rink since they were the first major team to use the system, but it is not known whose idea it originally was. 1 to 3 indicates a rock in the free guard zone, 4 to 6 the rings in front of the tee line, 7 being on the button, and 8 to 10 the rings behind the tee line. Sometimes, 11 is used to indicate a stone thrown so that it passes through the house and out of play. With this system, the sweepers can communicate more effectively where they think the stone will end up or the skip can better tell the deliverer how hard to throw it.

== # ==
2 hammers to 1
An endgame strategy based on maintaining hammer in the even ends of the last 3 ends of the game. If the team with hammer always scores (in other words, no blanks and no steals), then one team will have one more scoring opportunity than the other (hence "2 to 1").
4-foot
The 4-foot-diameter (1.2 m) circle in the house. It surrounds the centre area called the button. It is used as a visual aid only – there is no extra score for placing a stone within it
8-foot
The 8-foot-diameter (2.4 m) circle in the house. It is used as a visual aid only – there is no extra score for placing a stone within it; generally not actually painted – it appears as the empty space between the 12-foot and 4-foot rings
12-foot
The 12-foot-diameter (3.7 m) circle outermost in the house; a stone completely outside this circle cannot score

== A ==
Across the face
On a hit, refers to the shooter hitting the object stone on the opposite side from where the broom was placed. Since this imparts less speed to the object stone and takes less speed away from the shooter, it is a very efficient way of making a tick. This is seldom used for normal hits since it is harder to execute, unless necessary because a guard prevents using the other turn
Alternate
(also called a substitute, fifth, fifth man, or spare) is a curler on a team that only plays when another member of the team is not able to play. On occasion, they may be brought in late in a game where the result is not in doubt to gain experience. Outside of playing, an alternate may be expected to take on some coaching responsibilities.
Anti-freeze
A very rare and extremely difficult shot in which a stone is delivered so that it will come to rest behind another stone already in play, created the same effect as if one stone had been frozen to the other
Anti-slider
Synonymous with gripper
Arena ice
Temporary curling ice made quickly on a hockey rink or the like, most often used by curling clubs without dedicated curling facilities; usually of lower quality than that of a dedicated facility, but when created for televised events or events with large numbers of spectators, the ice quality can rival or even exceed that of a dedicated facility
Arithmetically eliminated
WCF term for when a team runs out of stones
Around the horn
A double or triple where the shooter ends up coming back up the rings

== B ==
Back 4
The portion of the 4 foot ring behind the tee line
Back 8
The portion of the 8 foot ring behind the tee line
Back 12
The portion of the 12 foot ring behind the tee line
Back board
The border at the extreme ends of the sheet
Back end
A team's third and skip, considered as a unit.
Back-house weight
Delivery speed required for a stone to come to rest in the back half of the house
Backing
A stationary stone that can be used to stop the thrown stone from going any farther, thus allowing for a slightly heavy throw. Without backing, the shot will be harder since it requires perfect draw weight.
Back line
The line right behind the house. If a rock completely crosses the back line, it is removed from play
Back of the house
The portion of the house behind the tee line
Back ring
Synonymous with back 12
Barrier
A board or other object behind the hack, used to stop moving stones; referred to as "bumper" in Canada
Barrier weight
Delivery speed that should come to rest against the barrier behind the hack. Synonymous with board weight.
Besom
The traditional name for the device used to sweep ahead of a moving stone. A broom.
Bite
When a stone barely touches the designated line marking on the ice, e.g. "bite centre", "bite the four", etc.
Biter
A stone that barely touches the outside of the house, just biting the 12-foot ring
Bite stick / Biter bar
A piece of equipment used to determine whether or not a stone is a biter
Blank end
An end in which no points are scored; in regular play the team that has the hammer retains it for the next end. In skins games, the skin for a blanked end is carried over. To "blank an end" means to intentionally leave no stones in the house so as to retain the hammer.
Blanking an end
Deliberately creating a blank end for the purposes of retaining the last rock advantage for the next end of play
Blast
A shot delivered with heavy weight and high velocity. A blast is usually intended to remove many stones from play or is used to break up and move around clustered stones. "Playing the blast" into a large cluster of stones is often a last resort shot to get the rocks split up when there are no other viable shots available.
Board weight
Throwing a stone with enough speed that it will come to rest in an area just behind the hacks – about 6 feet behind the house. Synonymous with barrier/bumper weight.
Boating
A way to break in the ice by which one drags harnessed rocks over the recently pebbled sheet in order to break the beaks of the water droplets on the ice.
Bonspiel
Scots for league match, this is the term used for a curling tournament. Compare "spiel"
Bounce
A failed corner freeze where the shooter rolls open
Brier
The Canadian men's curling championship, held annually since 1927
Broom
An implement with which players sweep the ice to make a stone travel farther and curl less; though brushes have almost completely replaced brooms, the traditional name remains.
Broomstacking
See stacking the brooms
Brush / brushing
Broom / Sweeping
Bump
A short raise
Bumper
The barrier
Bumper weight
Synonymous with barrier/board weight
Buried
A rock that is hidden behind another rock, usually a guard, making it difficult for a curler to hit with a delivered rock. Also called "covered"
Burn
To accidentally touch a moving stone; the opposing skip has the option to remove the burned stone, or leave it where it comes to rest
Button
The centre (bullseye) of the house; sometimes called the 1-foot circle

== C ==
Calling the shot
When the skip determines and indicates the outcome desired for a shot and places the broom where they want the person delivering the stone to aim. When the skip is delivering, the vice-skip holds the broom where the skip has indicated
Cashspiel
A tournament with significant entry fees and large prizes, sometimes part of a charity event; despite the large prizes, cashspiels are not the premier events in curling
Catcher
A stone behind the tee line that may obstruct other stones from being removed
CCW
Counter Clockwise (turn of the stone from delivery)
Centre guard
A guard that is placed directly on the centre line, in front of the house; usually played by the team that does not have the hammer
Centre line
A line running lengthwise down the centre of the ice, used as a visual aid; some sheets do not have a centre line, or do not have one between the hog lines
Chip
A takeout that hits a rock at an angle
Chip and lie / chip and roll
When a played stone strikes the edge of another stone and moves to another position in play
Christmas tree
Series of rocks in the house arrayed from front to back in such a way that a corner of each successive rock is visible from the hack, angling out like the edge of a Christmas tree.
Chroming the rock
Grazing a stationary stone without significantly moving it; but enough to alter the path of the shooting rock
Circus shot
A flashy but low-percentage shot. Also Trick shot
Clean
To brush the ice lightly in front of a moving rock to remove any debris and ensure a correct line; less vigorous than a sweep
Club
The location of the curling rink; most players usually refer to it as "The Club"
Come-around
Any shot that curls around another rock
Coming home
Going into the final end
Control weight
A takeout shot that is slow enough that the sweepers have relative control over its curl; faster than board weight, but slower than normal takeout weight
Corner guard
A type of guard that is off to the side of the house; usually employed when a team has the hammer and needs to score multiple points
Counter
A stone in the house lying closer to the centre than any of the opponent's stones. Each counter scores one point at the completion of an end.
Cover
Protection given to a rock by a rock in front of it
Curl
Movement of a moving rock away from a straight line; as a verb, to play at curling
Curler
General term for player involved in a curling team; also known as a "soofter" in the UK
Curling
A team sport which involves sliding granite stones on ice and sweeping in front of them with brooms to direct them to desired placements
Curling club
Synonymous with club
Curling pin
A participation souvenir, generally worn on a sweater; there is a sub-culture at any major bonspiel built around trading pins. Most curling clubs and many tournaments produce one, and they are usually not awards
Curling stick
A device that permits a player to deliver a stone while standing upright; generally used by older players, these are legal in most games.
Cutter
A rock that has a tendency to finish more than other rocks.
CW
Clockwise (turn of the stone from delivery)

== D ==
Dead buried
A rock completely covered by another rock (often a guard) such that no part is visible
Dead handle
Synonymous with no handle
Delivery
Process of throwing a stone
Deuce
Scoring 2 points in an end
Die!
A call given by the skip for the sweepers to stop sweeping a rock; a rock that dies is a rock that stops moving
Dish
State of a sheet of ice where the sides are slightly elevated compared to the center, so that a cross section of the ice would look like a cross section of a dish; this sometimes happens near the end of a week-long tournament because the pebbling motion tends to apply more pebbles to the side, while sweeping during games happens more often near the center and wears down the ice more in that region; when there is a dish, rocks will curl more towards the center and less away from the center
Double takeout / Double
A takeout shot in which two other stones are removed from play; a shot in which the delivered stone and one other stone are removed is not a double takeout
Doubles curling
A variation of curling played with 2 people per team and slightly altered rules. Most commonly seen as mixed doubles.
Drag
When two rocks are frozen, hitting the top rock at an angle creates a drag effect that affects the direction of the second rock; the friction between the two frozen rocks makes the first rock "drag" the second rock slightly towards the same direction; hitting the top rock on the right makes the bottom rock move more to the left while hitting it on the left makes it move more to the right
Draw
A shot that lands in play without hitting another stone out, as opposed to a takeout shot. Also refers to a game, e.g., “We have a draw at 7:00 p.m. tonight.”
Draw raise
A shot in which the played stone pushes a stone straight forward into the house
Drawmaster
Person who assigns teams to different sheets, sets starting times, assigns players to teams in casual play, etc.
Draw weight
Delivery speed required for a stone to come to rest in the house
Dump the handle (also Flip or Turn-Out/Turn-In)
During delivery of a stone, the thrower accidentally pushes the stone off-course with their turning motion; often the result of using the arm to shove the stone, and usually causes a missed shot

== E ==
Easy
Command – called out by the skip to tell the sweepers to ease off their sweeping of a rock but to continue sweeping it lightly and slowly.
Eight-ender
An end where all eight stones score for one team – a very rare occurrence.
End
Similar to an inning in baseball; in an end, each team throws 8 rocks, 2 per player in alternating fashion; tournament style games usually run for 10 ends; games played at the club level usually run for 8 ends. Prior to the latter half of the twentieth century, a game consisted of 12 ends played in full.
Extra end
Equivalent to an extra inning in baseball; in the event of a tie after the prescribed number of ends, extra ends are played until the tie is broken.
Eye on the Hog
Technology in the rock handles to electronically detect hog line violations using magnetic strips under the hog lines and red/green LED indicators.

== F ==
Fall
A defect in the ice which causes stones thrown in that area to curl negatively
Falling
As the stone is sliding down the sheet, it curls negatively, i.e., the opposite direction than it is supposed to
Finish
The amount of sideways movement in the last 3 meters (10 feet) or so of a rock's path; can be used as a verb ("it needs to finish") or a noun ("there's lots of finish in that spot")
Firm weight
Something more than Normal weight but less than Peel weight
Flash
To completely miss an attempted takeout; the rock passes through the house without touching any rocks at all
Force
When the team with hammer scores exactly 1 point on that end.
Fourth
The player throwing the last two rocks for a team; since the skip almost always throws the last two rocks, this term is rarely used
Free-Guard Zone
Area between the hog line and the tee line, excluding the house. Evolved from the Moncton Rule.
Free-Guard Zone Rule
The rule that states that an opponent's rock resting in the free-guard zone cannot be removed from play until the first five rocks of an end have been played
Freeze
A precise draw weight shot where a delivered stone comes to rest against a stationary stone, making it nearly impossible to take out
Front end
A team's lead and second, considered as a unit
Front-house weight
Delivery speed required for a stone to come to rest in the front half of the house
Front of the House
The half of the house closer to the hog line
Front ring
Synonymous with top 12
Frost
Buildup that can occur on ice surfaces when there is excessive humidity in the air; tends to makes stones stop faster and curl less
Fun Spiel
Bonspiel oriented to recreational/fun play, often shorter duration games, and may have unusual formats

== G ==
Game Clock
A clock that runs down and limits the amount of time a team can spend playing. Traditionally, the game clock ran from the end of the opposition's shot until the end of the team's clock, much like a chess clock. Now, thinking time is the standard.
Guard
A rock that is placed in front of another rock to protect it from being knocked out by the other team, or placed with the intent to later curl another rock around it and thus be protected; typically placed between the hog line and the very front of the house
Grand Slam of Curling
A series of eight premier men's and women's events that feature Canada's deepest and strongest curling fields
Gripper
A rubber or other material attached to a curling shoe to improve traction on the ice; also known as an anti-slider; see Slider

== H ==
Hack
Similar to a starting block in track and field, the foothold device where the person who throws the rock pushes off for delivery
Hack weight
The weight required to deliver a stone in order that it travels to the hack at the far end
Hackweight takeout
A slower played takeout that, because of the reduced speed, curls more and therefore can reach opponent stones that are hidden behind a guard
Hammer
The last rock in an end – a huge advantage; the team with the last rock is said to "have the hammer"
Hammer efficiency
The percentage of non-blank ends in which the team who has hammer scores two or more points.
Handle
The part of the stone held by the player; also used to describe the desired direction of rotation of the handle (and therefore the stone) upon release in a given delivery; "Losing the handle" refers to a rock that stops rotating and may therefore stop curling or that changes direction of rotation and curl while moving; See also no handle, reverse handle, straight handle.
Handshake
Each team traditionally shakes hands with each member of the opposing team at the end of a match as a sign of goodwill. Unlike other sports, curlers can, and are often encouraged to, forfeit the game early out of sportsmanship if the score is badly lopsided or if a team runs out of stones. To signal their forfeit, the losing team shakes the hands of the other team. This can simply be called "shaking", as in "the Smith team shook after 7 ends".
Hard!
Command – along with "hurry" – shouted by the skip to tell the sweepers to sweep harder and faster
Heavy
A stone that is thrown harder than required and will probably slide too far
Heavy ice
Slow ice on which stones take more initial force to travel a similar distance as on fast (keen) ice (see keen ice)
High side
The high side of a shooter in motion is the side that it is curling away from, i.e., the side outside the curve of the shooter's path. To "hit on the high side" is to hit the stationary rock off-centre on the side the shooter came from.
Hit
Any shot where the aim is to move another stone
Hit and roll
A takeout rock that, after making contact with another rock, slides (rolls) into a designated area
Hit and stay
A takeout where the played stone stays in the spot where it made contact with the stationary stone; also called 'hit and stick' or a 'nose hit'
Hit weight
Another term for takeout weight
Hog
See "hogged rock"
Hog line (far)
The line which the stone must completely cross to be considered in play
Hog line (near)
The line before which the stone must be clearly and fully released by the thrower
Hog line violation
Failure to release a stone before crossing the near hog line; a stone in violation is immediately removed from play
Hogged rock
A shot that comes to rest short of or on the far hog line and is removed from play. May also refer to a stone that is removed from play due to a hog line violation.
Hogger
See "hogged rock"
House
The three concentric circles and the central button where points are scored
Hurry!
see hard! (often said together: "hurry hard!")

== I ==
Ice (more, less, too much, not enough)
Adjustment to the crosswise distance between the skip's broom and the desired target area; for example, a player who feels that the skip's broom is too close to the target might request "more ice"
Icemaker / Ice technician
Person who is responsible for maintaining the ice; duties include, but are not limited to, pebbling and scraping the ice
In-off
A shot where the delivered stone hits another stone near the outer edge of the sheet at an angle, making the shooter roll into the house; one of the most difficult curling shots, usually done as a last resort when there are no other options
In-turn
A shot in which the handle of the stone is rotated across the body (the elbow is rotated "in" to the body); for a right-handed thrower, an in-turn is clockwise, and the opposite for a lefty
Inside
Another term for narrow

== J ==
Jam
A takeout that collides with a catcher

== K ==
Keen ice
Fast ice on which stones travel greater distances with less force than required for heavy ice (see heavy ice) the Thoroughbred Race Horse Keen Ice was named after this term
Kizzle kazzle
A delivered stone that is intentionally wobbled to compensate for water, slush or snow on the ice surface

== L ==
Lazy handle
When the rotation of a stone is very slow, i.e., less than one full rotation during the stone's slide; often the result of thrower error, they will usually curl more than a properly delivered stone; may turn into a No Handle or Reverse Handle
Lead
The player who throws the first two rocks for a team
Lie / Lies / Lying
The count of the number of stones of one colour closest to the centre of the button, closer than the innermost stone of the other colour. When a team "lies X" or "is lying X", that number of its stones are, at that moment, closer to the button than any opposition stone; were the end to finish then, the team would score that number of points.
Line
The path of a moving stone; a 'good' line indicates it is headed where it was intended to go; a 'bad' line has deviated
Light
A stone that is not thrown hard enough
Little rocks
Many clubs offer a Little Rocks program for children, with rocks that are roughly half the weight of regular 44 lb. rocks. Curlers generally move onto full-sized rocks around the ages of 10 to 12.
Losing the handle
A rock that is "losing the handle" refers to a rock which loses its rotation or which reverses its rotation while moving
Lost turn
Synonymous with no handle
Low side
The low side of a shooter in motion is the side that it is curling toward, i.e., the side inside the curve of the shooter's path. To "hit on the low side" is to hit the stationary rock off-centre after the shooter crosses its face.
LSFE
Last Stone in the First End; in every other end, the last stone (or hammer) is determined by the scoring in the previous end. In the first end, some other system (coin toss, draw contest, record comparison) must be used to determine the advantage of the hammer.

== M ==
Manitoba tuck
A type of delivery, mostly found in Manitoba, where the body is kept very low to the ground and the leading leg is tucked underneath the body and to the side; this type is delivery is particularly efficient for hits but makes draws slightly tougher to execute, with the shoulders not being as straight and the eyes being closer to the ice
Mate
The player who discusses strategy with the skip behind the house and holds the broom while the skip throws their rocks; usually plays third; also known as vice-skip or vice
Measure stick
Equipment used to determine which of two or more stones is closest to the centre when they are too similar to know with visual inspection
Mixed team
A team composed of two men and two women with the throwing order alternating genders. Also known as True mixed. The highest level competition for mixed teams is the World Mixed Curling Championship.
Mixed doubles
A variation of curling played with 2 people per team, one man and one woman, and slightly altered rules.

== N ==
Narrow
A stone delivered off the broom too close to the desired target and therefore likely to curl past it
Negative ice
A shot in which the player curls the stone in the opposite direction in which the stone is expected to curve, due to significant defects in flatness of the ice surface; for example, if the curvature of the ice causes all stones to drift sharply to the right, a skip may request the shooter to aim to the left of the desired location and curve the stone to the left as well.
Never
Called as the rock is sliding down the sheet to indicate the stone needs to curl and the sweepers should stay off the rock
Nice weight
A term used by some Manitoba teams, similar to control weight
No handle
A rock delivered without a turn, usually done in error; stones thrown without a handle often follow an unpredictable path
No-tick rule
A rule prohibiting stones from being ticked off the centre line for the first five stones of an end (see Free-Guard Zone Rule); only used in some competitions
Normal weight
Normal takeout weight; faster than control weight, but slower than peel
Nose
The point on a rock closest to the thrower. A "nose hit" would be hitting the rock at this point, avoiding a roll.

== O ==
Off!
A call given by the skip for the sweepers to stop sweeping a rock
Off the broom
An incorrectly aimed shot; opposite of on the broom
Open
A rock that is not obscured by another rock from the thrower's perspective; a skip will often ask the thrower how "open" a certain rock appears from the hack, with the rock being totally open, partially obscured (such as "half open") or completely covered; also, a term for any shot not involving going around a guard: an open takeout, an open draw, etc.
On the broom
A correctly aimed shot that starts out directly at the broom held by the skip; opposite of off the broom
Out of stones
A situation in which a team that is behind in the score no longer has enough stones between those in play and those yet to be played to make up the deficit; the outcome is now certain, and the game usually ends with a handshake once a team is out of stones.
Outside
Another term for wide
Out-turn
A shot in which the handle of the stone is rotated away from the body – the elbow is rotated "out" from the body; for a right-handed thrower, an out-turn is counter-clockwise, and the opposite for a lefty

== P ==
Pancake
A rock
Pebble
Small droplets of water intentionally sprayed on the ice that cause irregularities on the surface, allowing the rocks to curl. Also a verb; the action of depositing water droplets on the ice, as "to pebble the ice between games"
Peel
A takeout that removes a stone from play as well as the delivered stone. These are usually intentional, such as for blanking an end.
Peel weight
A stone delivered with a heavy takeout weight
Pick
When a rock's running surface travels over a foreign particle such as a hair, causing the rock to deviate from its expected path, usually by increasing friction and thereby the amount of curl
Pin
Spot at the exact centre of the house, officially called the tee.
Playdowns
Competitive play towards club, state/provincial, national, and world championships
Port
A space between two stones just wide enough for a delivered stone to pass through
Promote
Another name for a raise; usually means to raise a guard into the house and make it a potential counter

== R ==
Raise
A shot in which the delivered stone bumps another stone forward
Raise takeout
A shot in which the delivered stone bumps a second stone which in turn knocks a third stone out of play. Also called a runback
Reading the ice
When a curler considers how the condition of a sheet of ice will influence the path of a thrown stone, similar to how a golfer reads the undulations and texture of a green before determining where and how hard to hit a putt
Reverse handle
When a stone is thrown with a particular turn, but it eventually stops and begins to rotate in the opposite direction; usually the result of a pick or poor ice conditions. Sometimes it may even reverse twice in one shot, creating unpredictable shots that follow an S-shaped path.
Right off!
A call given by the skip to tell the sweepers to neither sweep nor clean the rock; as compared to off!, which tells the sweepers to stop sweeping but not necessarily to stop cleaning
Rings
The house
Rink

1. A curling team. Often used with a location ("the Manitoba rink") or the name of the skip ("the Smith rink").
2. A building housing the ice sheets ("the curling rink")
3. Sometimes used as a synonym for sheet

Roaring Game, The
Slang for the game of curling, it is the sound a stone makes while sliding along the ice
Rock
The device thrown by curlers during the game. It is made of granite and has a standard weight of 19.6 kg (44 lb). Also called a stone
Roll
Any movement of a stone after striking another
Rotation
Description of a spinning rock
Rub
When a moving stone barely touches another stationary stone; less contact than a chip
Run
A section of the curling sheet that is dipped or troughed that can prevent a stone to curl or draw down its normal path of travel
Runback
See raise takeout
Running surface
The part of the rock which comes in contact with the ice. It is about 7 mm wide (0.25 inches)
Runthrough
See raise takeout

== S ==
Scraper
A device used by the Ice maker to smooth the ice after a period of extended play; usually performed in conjunction with pebbling
Scotties
The Canadian Women's Curling Championships. Also known as the Scotties Tournament of Hearts.
Second
The player who throws the third and fourth rocks for a team; on most teams they also sweep for all other players on their team
Second shot
The second closest rock to the button
Sheepskin
A wide brush, traditionally made of sheepskin, which is used to clean the ice of any loose debris, typically during the mid-game break (commonly after the 5th end of tournament play)
Sheet
The area of ice that on which one game is played
Shooter
In a hit, refers to the rock being thrown
Shot rock / shot stone
The rock in the house closest to the button; the next closest rocks are second shot and third shot. To "be shot" means to have shot rock.
Silver Broom
The curling world championships from 1968 to 1985
Skip
The player who calls the shots and traditionally throws the last two rocks; typically the best player on the team. As a verb, to "skip" means to lead one's rink
Skip's deuce
A deuce where the two counters are the rocks thrown by the fourth thrower (traditionally the skip)
Slide
The forward movement of a player during the delivery of a stone
Slider
A piece of Teflon or similar material attached to a curling shoe that allows the player to slide along the ice
Soft release
A type of release that makes the rock curl more, usually by imparting less rotation to the handle
Spiel
Scots for match, game or competition, this is the term used for a curling competition between members of the same club or community, for example parish spiel; also used as an abbreviation for Bonspiel. Compare Bonspiel.
Spinner
A stone traveling with a rapid rotation. Stones thrown in this manner will curl only a small amount, if at all
Split
A draw shot in which the played stone hits on the side of a stationary stone and both move sideways and stay in play. Not to be confused with split the house
Split the House
A strategy of drawing to a different area of the house to prevent your opponent from taking out both stones
Stacking the brooms
Slang for socializing with teammates and opponents, often over a drink, after a game
Steal
Scoring in an end without the hammer
Stick
A takeout that "sticks" in place after hitting the opposing rock
Stone
A rock
Straight handle
Synonymous with no handle
Straight ice
Ice on which stones curl less than usual
Strike weight
a weight that can take out another stone
Sweep
To brush the ice in front of a moving stone, which causes it to travel further and curl less
Swing the stick around
To use the measuring device to determine shot rock
Swingy ice
Ice on which stones curl more than usual

== T ==
Takeout
A rock that hits another rock and removes it from play
Takeout weight
The weight required when delivering a stone in order to make a takeout
Tap back
Use of the delivery stone to tap another rock towards the back of the house
Tee
The centre point of the house, where the tee line crosses the centre line; the stones' distances from the tee determine the score for each end. Also called the pin
Tee line
The line that goes across the house intersecting with the middle of the button, splitting it into two halves
Thick / thin
The degree of contact between two rocks; the thicker the hit, the more contact between the stones; a hit with a small amount of contact is thin.
Thinking Time
A method of timing in which a team's game clock only counts down between the end of the opposition's prior shot and the start of the team's shot.
Third
The player who throws the fifth and sixth rocks for a team; usually also serves as vice-skip
Third shot
The third closest rock to the button
Tick
A shot that bumps a guard out of the way without removing it from play, to avoid violating the Free Guard Zone Rule; usually played with lead rocks late in a game to prevent the trailing team from setting up a steal
Tight
Another term for narrow
Time
At professional levels sweepers use a timer to measure the time between the start of the delivery and the rock hitting the hog line, and will then call out that time as an indicator of the shot's weight. "Time" can also refer to the amount of time left on the game clock
Top 4
The portion of the 4 foot ring in front of the tee line
Top 8
The portion of the 8 foot ring in front of the tee line
Top 12
The portion of the 12 foot ring in front of the tee line
Tournament of Hearts
The Canadian women's curling championship, held annually since 1982; other women's tournaments were held previously
Trick shot
A flashy but low-percentage shot; also Circus shot
Triple
A takeout shot in which three other stones are removed from play
True mixed
An event format where the teams must have two men and two women, played in alternating positions

== U ==
Up!
Command shouted by a skip – sometimes "off!" or "whoa!" – to tell sweepers to stop sweeping (to bring the brooms "up" off the ice)

== V ==
Vice-skip or Vice
The player who discusses strategy with the skip behind the house and holds the broom while the skip throws their rocks; usually plays third; also known as mate

== W ==
WCF
The World Curling Federation is the sport's governing body at international level, defining its rules and managing various international and regional championships.
Weight
The amount of speed with which a rock is delivered; more weight corresponds to a harder throw. When used in a phrase such as "tee-line weight", it refers to the delivery speed required for the rock to come to rest on the tee-line.
Wick
A shot where the played stone touches a stationary stone just enough that the played stone changes direction
Wide
A stone delivered off the broom to the side away from the desired target, and therefore unlikely to curl far enough to reach it
Whoa!
Synonymous with off
Wobbler
A stone that rocks from side to side as it travels because it is not resting on its running surface
Wrecked shot
A missed shot caused by an accidental chip or wick off of another stationary stone
