= Warren Hansen =

Canadian curler (born 1943)

- Curler
- Born: February 15, 1943 (age 83); Edmonton, Alberta

Curling career
- Brier: 1 (1974)
- World Championship: 1 (1974)
Medal record
World Curling Championships
Representing Canada
Bronze medal – third place	1974 Bern
Macdonald Brier
Representing Alberta
Gold medal – first place	1974 London

Warren R. Hansen (born February 15, 1943) is a Canadian retired curler. He played as third on the Hec Gervais rink that won the 1974 Brier. Hansen served as director of event operations for Curling Canada, but retired in June 2015. He currently is operating a podcast called Inside Curling with Kevin Martin and Jim Jerome. He previously worked for the United States Curling Association as a Business Development Consultant from 2017 - 2020. Hansen worked for Curling Canada (formerly the Canadian Curling Association) 1974 - 2015. His involvement with the organization has been instrumental in moving major events into hockey arenas, introducing the page playoff system, reducing the amount of sheets in events to four, implementing player dress codes, bringing in officiating of major events and the creation of the Continental Cup of Curling and Canada Cup of Curling. In addition Hansen played a key role, along with Calgary's Ray Kingsmith in establishing curling as a demonstration sport at the 1988 Winter Olympics in Calgary. In 2002 he developed the game of Mixed Doubles as part of the newly created Continental Cup. In June 2015 it was announced that Mixed Doubles will be a full medal sport at the 2018 Winter Olympics. Hansen is a member of the Alberta Sports Hall of Fame as a team member of the Edmonton Huskies and also as a Curling Builder. He is a member of the City of Edmonton Sports Hall of Fame as a team member of the Huskies and a Member Emeritus of the Honorary Governor General's Curling Club, a Builder in the British Columbia Curling Hall of Fame, a Curler/Builder in the Canadian Curling Hall of Fame and a Builder in the World Curing Hall of Fame.

In 1972 Hansen, with Jim Pettapiece of Winnipeg, originated the Silver Broom Curling School that over a period of 10 years taught thousands of students across Canada, United States, Europe and Japan how to curl and to improve as curlers. As a result of his involvement with the Silver Broom School Hansen was contracted in 1974 by the Canadian Curling Association to develop a teaching system for curling instructors and coaches in Canada. Between 1974 and 1980 Hansen directed the development of Level's I - III of the National Coaching Certification Program for the sport of curling. The original name attached to the program was "Curl Canada".

He has written two books, the first in 1999 published by Key Porter, Curling, The History, The Players, The Game and the second in 2022 which was published by Freisen Press, Sticks 'n' Stones, The Battle for Curling to be an Olympic Sport.

Hansen grew up in Namao, Alberta and played junior football for the Edmonton Huskies when the team won three consecutive Canadian championships in 1962, '63 and '64. He played second on Alberta's 1974 Brier championship team, skipped by Hec Gervais, that finished third at the 1974 World Men's Championship in Bern, Switzerland. Hansen played second on team Alberta at the 1973 Canadian Mixed Curling Championship where the team, skipped by Ron Anton, won the silver medal.
