= 1989 Labatt Brier =

- Host city: Saskatoon, Saskatchewan
- Arena: Saskatchewan Place
- Dates: March 5–12
- Attendance: 151,538
- Winner: Alberta
- Curling club: Ottewell CC, Edmonton
- Skip: Pat Ryan
- Third: Randy Ferbey
- Second: Don Walchuk
- Lead: Don McKenzie
- Alternate: Murray Ursulak
- Finalist: British Columbia (Rick Folk)

The 1989 Labatt Brier, the Canadian men's curling championship, was held from March 5 to 12 at the Saskatchewan Place in Saskatoon, Saskatchewan.

Pat Ryan of Alberta defeated Rick Folk of British Columbia to win his second Brier.

== "The Ryan Express" ==
Pat Ryan's team was well known for its hitting style. Once they got the lead, the team would just peel off every opposition stone to win the game. This defensive strategy was heavily criticized for being boring. Whenever Ryan switched to this style of play, fans began shouting "bor-ing". However, the strategy worked for Ryan, who won the Brier. The score of the final game (3–2), remains the lowest total score for a final game in Brier history. This caused the implementation of the free guard zone a few years later to cause more offence in the game.

== Howard loses his voice ==
Also of note at the 1989 Brier was Ontario skip Russ Howard's loss of his voice. Howard was nicknamed "the Wounded Moose" for the way he screamed in the first few draws of the event. However, he would lose his voice by Tuesday, and could barely speak. So, the team opted to use Walkie-talkies to communicate with their skip. This went unnoticed until their walkie-talkie signals jammed the official's walkie-talkie signals. The Canadian Curling Association (CCA) was quite upset about the matter, but Howard pointed out there was nothing in the rules against their usage, and insisted on continuing to use the walkie-talkies. So, the CCA decided midway through the event to ban the use of walkie-talkies, marking the first time that the rules had been changed in the middle of a tournament.

== Teams ==
The teams were listed as follows:

Alberta	British Columbia	Manitoba
Ottewell CC, Edmonton Skip: Pat Ryan; Third: Randy Ferbey; Second: Don Walchuk; Lead: Don McKenzie; Alternate: Murray Ursulak	Kelowna CC, Kelowna Skip: Rick Folk; Third: Bert Gretzinger; Second: Rob Koffski; Lead: Doug Smith; Alternate: Fred Trussell	Lac du Bonnet CC, Lac du Bonnet Skip: Orest Meleschuk; Third: John Usackis; Second: John Hyrich; Lead: Sean Meleschuk; Alternate: Bob Lesko
New Brunswick	Newfoundland	Northern Ontario
Thistle St. Andrews CC, Saint John Skip: Gary Mitchell; Third: Brian Dobson; Second: Mark Armstrong; Lead: Terry Roach; Alternate: Arnie Dobson	St. John's CC, St. John's Skip: Lorne Henderson; Third: Alex Smith; Second: Peter Hollett; Lead: Marc Brophy; Alternate: Ken Thomas	Fort William CC, Thunder Bay Skip: Al Hackner; Third: Bill Adams; Second: Jim Adams; Lead: John Salo; Alternate: Keith Dolph
Nova Scotia	Ontario	Prince Edward Island
Truro CC, Truro Skip: Ragnar Kamp; Third: Bruce Lohnes; Second: Rod McCarron; Lead: Peter Neily; Alternate: Ted Lohnes	Penetanguishene CC, Penetanguishene Skip: Russ Howard; Third: Glenn Howard; Second: Tim Belcourt; Lead: Kent Carstairs; Alternate: Larry Merkley	Charlottetown CC, Charlottetown Skip: Doug Weeks; Third: Blair Weeks; Second: Roy Rodd; Lead: David Weeks; Alternate: Allan Ledgerwood
Quebec	Saskatchewan	Yukon/Northwest Territories
Buckingham CC, Buckingham Skip: Pierre Charette; Third: Andre Lafleur; Second: Don Westphal; Lead: Richard Bisson; Alternate: Ted Butler	Estevan CC, Estevan Skip: Jim Packet; Third: Bob Doerr; Second: Lloyd Schmidt; Lead: Dallas Duce; Alternate: Peter Shykitka	Yellowknife CC, Yellowknife Skip: Al Delmage; Third: Roy Giles; Second: Bill Strain; Lead: Ron Kapicki; Alternate: Brad Robertson

== Map of teams ==
Provincial Winners

== Round-robin standings ==
Final Round Robin standings

Key
Teams to Playoffs

Locale	Skip	W	L	PF	PA	EW	EL	BE	SE	S%
Alberta	Pat Ryan	8	3	60	51	39	36	12	7	82%
British Columbia	Rick Folk	8	3	62	56	43	40	15	11	81%
Ontario	Russ Howard	8	3	67	51	47	40	6	16	80%
Newfoundland	Lorne Henderson	7	4	64	64	41	44	7	7	75%
Manitoba	Orest Meleschuk	7	4	65	58	45	43	12	7	79%
Nova Scotia	Ragnar Kamp	7	4	65	45	46	31	8	16	77%
Saskatchewan	Jim Packet	6	5	67	53	40	38	15	12	81%
Quebec	Pierre Charette	5	6	75	68	46	45	11	8	77%
Yukon/Northwest Territories	Al Delmage	3	8	55	71	40	43	10	9	72%
Northern Ontario	Al Hackner	3	8	55	75	40	48	6	7	76%
New Brunswick	Gary Mitchell	2	9	52	73	37	47	7	8	77%
Prince Edward Island	Doug Weeks	2	9	54	76	37	46	6	5	75%

== Round-robin results ==
=== Draw 1 ===
Sheet A	1	2	3	4	5	6	7	8	9	10	Final
Alberta (Ryan) 🔨	1	0	2	1	0	0	2	0	0	1	7
Quebec (Charette)	0	1	0	0	0	3	0	1	0	0	5

Sheet B	1	2	3	4	5	6	7	8	9	10	Final
Northern Ontario (Hackner)	0	0	0	1	0	0	1	0	0	X	2
Nova Scotia (Kamp) 🔨	1	1	1	0	0	2	0	1	0	X	6

Sheet C	1	2	3	4	5	6	7	8	9	10	Final
Newfoundland and Labrador (Henderson)	0	0	0	1	1	0	0	1	0	0	3
Saskatchewan (Packet) 🔨	0	2	1	0	0	1	0	0	0	2	6

Sheet D	1	2	3	4	5	6	7	8	9	10	Final
Yukon/Northwest Territories (Delmage)	0	1	0	0	0	0	1	0	0	X	2
Manitoba (Meleschuk) 🔨	1	0	0	1	1	0	0	0	1	X	4

Sheet E	1	2	3	4	5	6	7	8	9	10	Final
Ontario (Howard) 🔨	1	1	1	0	2	1	0	0	0	0	6
New Brunswick (Mitchell)	0	0	0	1	0	0	1	2	0	1	5

=== Draw 2 ===
Sheet A	1	2	3	4	5	6	7	8	9	10	Final
Ontario (Howard) 🔨	1	0	1	0	2	0	0	1	1	0	6
Manitoba (Meleschuk)	0	1	0	1	0	0	2	0	0	1	5

Sheet B	1	2	3	4	5	6	7	8	9	10	Final
Saskatchewan (Packet)	1	0	0	3	0	4	0	1	0	X	9
Yukon/Northwest Territories (Delmage) 🔨	0	0	2	0	1	0	1	0	2	X	6

Sheet C	1	2	3	4	5	6	7	8	9	10	Final
Quebec (Charette) 🔨	2	0	1	0	0	3	1	0	1	X	8
New Brunswick (Mitchell)	0	2	0	2	0	0	0	1	0	X	5

Sheet D	1	2	3	4	5	6	7	8	9	10	Final
Alberta (Ryan) 🔨	0	1	0	0	1	0	0	0	1	0	3
Newfoundland and Labrador (Henderson)	0	0	1	2	0	0	1	0	0	2	6

Sheet E	1	2	3	4	5	6	7	8	9	10	Final
British Columbia (Folk) 🔨	0	0	1	0	0	1	0	3	0	X	5
Prince Edward Island (Weeks)	1	0	0	0	1	0	1	0	1	X	4

=== Draw 3 ===
Sheet C	1	2	3	4	5	6	7	8	9	10	Final
Saskatchewan (Packet)	0	0	2	0	2	0	0	1	1	3	9
Alberta (Ryan) 🔨	1	0	0	2	0	1	0	0	0	0	4

Sheet D	1	2	3	4	5	6	7	8	9	10	Final
Newfoundland and Labrador (Henderson)	0	0	0	1	0	1	0	2	3	0	7
Quebec (Charette) 🔨	2	1	1	0	3	0	1	0	0	1	9

=== Draw 4 ===
Sheet A	1	2	3	4	5	6	7	8	9	10	Final
Newfoundland and Labrador (Henderson)	0	1	0	0	0	1	0	0	3	1	6
Yukon/Northwest Territories (Delmage) 🔨	2	0	1	0	1	0	0	1	0	0	5

Sheet B	1	2	3	4	5	6	7	8	9	10	Final
New Brunswick (Mitchell) 🔨	0	0	0	2	0	3	0	0	0	X	5
British Columbia (Folk)	2	2	2	0	1	0	0	1	1	X	9

Sheet C	1	2	3	4	5	6	7	8	9	10	Final
Manitoba (Meleschuk)	1	0	2	0	0	0	3	0	1	X	7
Nova Scotia (Kamp) 🔨	0	1	0	0	1	0	0	1	0	X	3

Sheet D	1	2	3	4	5	6	7	8	9	10	Final
Ontario (Howard) 🔨	1	0	0	0	2	0	0	1	3	X	7
Prince Edward Island (Weeks)	0	1	0	1	0	0	1	0	0	X	3

Sheet E	1	2	3	4	5	6	7	8	9	10	Final
Saskatchewan (Packet)	1	0	0	2	0	0	0	0	2	0	5
Northern Ontario (Hackner) 🔨	0	1	2	0	1	0	0	2	0	1	7

=== Draw 5 ===
Sheet A	1	2	3	4	5	6	7	8	9	10	Final
Nova Scotia (Kamp) 🔨	2	0	1	1	0	0	1	0	0	2	7
New Brunswick (Mitchell)	0	2	0	0	1	2	0	1	0	0	6

Sheet B	1	2	3	4	5	6	7	8	9	10	Final
Prince Edward Island (Weeks) 🔨	1	0	3	0	2	1	0	0	1	X	8
Manitoba (Meleschuk)	0	1	0	2	0	0	1	0	0	X	4

Sheet C	1	2	3	4	5	6	7	8	9	10	Final
British Columbia (Folk)	1	0	1	0	2	0	2	0	0	1	7
Ontario (Howard) 🔨	0	2	0	1	0	1	0	1	1	0	6

Sheet D	1	2	3	4	5	6	7	8	9	10	Final
Quebec (Charette)	0	0	2	0	2	1	0	3	X	X	8
Northern Ontario (Hackner) 🔨	1	0	0	1	0	0	1	0	X	X	3

Sheet E	1	2	3	4	5	6	7	8	9	10	Final
Yukon/Northwest Territories (Delmage) 🔨	2	0	0	1	0	0	1	0	0	X	4
Alberta (Ryan)	0	2	2	0	2	0	0	1	0	X	7

=== Draw 6 ===
Sheet B	1	2	3	4	5	6	7	8	9	10	Final
Yukon/Northwest Territories (Delmage) 🔨	0	1	1	0	0	0	1	0	0	X	3
Ontario (Howard)	0	0	0	2	1	1	0	3	1	X	8

Sheet C	1	2	3	4	5	6	7	8	9	10	Final
New Brunswick (Mitchell)	0	1	0	0	2	0	0	2	0	0	5
Manitoba (Meleschuk) 🔨	1	0	1	0	0	0	2	0	1	2	7

=== Draw 7 ===
Sheet A	1	2	3	4	5	6	7	8	9	10	Final
Saskatchewan (Packet)	0	1	0	3	1	4	X	X	X	X	9
Prince Edward Island (Weeks) 🔨	1	0	2	0	0	0	X	X	X	X	3

Sheet B	1	2	3	4	5	6	7	8	9	10	Final
Newfoundland and Labrador (Henderson) 🔨	0	1	0	0	0	1	0	0	0	X	2
New Brunswick (Mitchell)	0	0	2	1	1	0	0	0	3	X	7

Sheet C	1	2	3	4	5	6	7	8	9	10	Final
Northern Ontario (Hackner) 🔨	2	0	1	0	0	2	0	2	1	0	8
Yukon/Northwest Territories (Delmage)	0	2	0	1	3	0	2	0	0	1	9

Sheet D	1	2	3	4	5	6	7	8	9	10	Final
British Columbia (Folk) 🔨	1	0	0	0	0	0	0	0	0	X	1
Alberta (Ryan)	0	1	0	0	0	0	0	0	2	X	3

Sheet E	1	2	3	4	5	6	7	8	9	10	11	Final
Nova Scotia (Kamp)	0	1	0	0	0	0	1	1	2	0	1	6
Quebec (Charette) 🔨	2	0	0	0	0	1	0	0	0	2	0	5

=== Draw 8 ===
Sheet A	1	2	3	4	5	6	7	8	9	10	Final
Northern Ontario (Hackner) 🔨	0	0	0	0	0	1	0	1	0	X	2
British Columbia (Folk)	0	0	1	1	0	0	2	0	1	X	5

Sheet B	1	2	3	4	5	6	7	8	9	10	11	Final
Quebec (Charette)	0	1	0	0	1	0	1	0	0	2	1	6
Prince Edward Island (Weeks) 🔨	1	0	0	1	0	2	0	0	1	0	0	5

Sheet C	1	2	3	4	5	6	7	8	9	10	Final
Nova Scotia (Kamp) 🔨	2	0	1	0	0	0	1	0	0	0	4
Alberta (Ryan)	0	3	0	1	0	0	0	0	0	1	5

Sheet D	1	2	3	4	5	6	7	8	9	10	Final
Ontario (Howard)	0	0	1	1	0	3	1	0	0	X	6
Saskatchewan (Packet) 🔨	0	0	0	0	1	0	0	0	1	X	2

Sheet E	1	2	3	4	5	6	7	8	9	10	Final
Newfoundland and Labrador (Henderson)	0	1	0	2	0	2	0	1	0	1	7
Manitoba (Meleschuk) 🔨	0	0	1	0	1	0	2	0	2	0	6

=== Draw 9 ===
Sheet C	1	2	3	4	5	6	7	8	9	10	11	Final
Northern Ontario (Hackner)	1	0	0	1	0	3	0	0	2	0	2	9
Prince Edward Island (Weeks) 🔨	0	1	1	0	2	0	2	0	0	1	0	7

Sheet D	1	2	3	4	5	6	7	8	9	10	Final
Nova Scotia (Kamp)	0	0	2	0	0	1	1	0	X	X	4
British Columbia (Folk) 🔨	0	3	0	2	1	0	0	0	X	X	6

=== Draw 10 ===
Sheet A	1	2	3	4	5	6	7	8	9	10	11	Final
Quebec (Charette) 🔨	1	2	0	0	2	0	1	0	0	1	0	7
Ontario (Howard)	0	0	2	1	0	2	0	2	0	0	1	8

Sheet B	1	2	3	4	5	6	7	8	9	10	Final
Manitoba (Meleschuk) 🔨	0	1	0	1	1	0	0	0	0	1	4
Alberta (Ryan)	0	0	0	0	0	0	1	1	0	0	2

Sheet C	1	2	3	4	5	6	7	8	9	10	Final
Yukon/Northwest Territories (Delmage) 🔨	1	0	0	1	1	0	2	0	1	0	6
British Columbia (Folk)	0	2	1	0	0	1	0	2	0	1	7

Sheet D	1	2	3	4	5	6	7	8	9	10	Final
Newfoundland and Labrador (Henderson) 🔨	3	0	2	4	X	X	X	X	X	X	9
Prince Edward Island (Weeks)	0	1	0	0	X	X	X	X	X	X	1

Sheet E	1	2	3	4	5	6	7	8	9	10	Final
New Brunswick (Mitchell)	0	0	0	0	1	0	0	0	X	X	1
Saskatchewan (Packet) 🔨	0	2	2	1	0	0	0	2	X	X	7

=== Draw 11 ===
Sheet A	1	2	3	4	5	6	7	8	9	10	11	Final
Manitoba (Meleschuk)	0	2	0	2	0	0	1	0	1	0	1	7
Saskatchewan (Packet) 🔨	0	0	1	0	2	0	0	2	0	1	0	6

Sheet B	1	2	3	4	5	6	7	8	9	10	Final
Nova Scotia (Kamp)	0	1	0	0	0	0	1	1	1	0	4
Newfoundland and Labrador (Henderson) 🔨	1	0	0	0	0	2	0	0	0	2	5

Sheet C	1	2	3	4	5	6	7	8	9	10	Final
Alberta (Ryan)	0	0	0	1	0	2	0	0	3	X	6
New Brunswick (Mitchell) 🔨	0	1	0	0	1	0	0	1	0	X	3

Sheet D	1	2	3	4	5	6	7	8	9	10	Final
Northern Ontario (Hackner)	0	1	0	0	0	1	0	0	0	X	2
Ontario (Howard) 🔨	1	0	0	1	1	0	0	0	1	X	4

Sheet E	1	2	3	4	5	6	7	8	9	10	Final
Quebec (Charette)	0	2	1	0	1	0	0	0	0	X	4
Yukon/Northwest Territories (Delmage) 🔨	1	0	0	1	0	1	0	2	2	X	7

=== Draw 12 ===
Sheet A	1	2	3	4	5	6	7	8	9	10	Final
Yukon/Northwest Territories (Delmage)	0	0	0	1	0	0	X	X	X	X	1
Nova Scotia (Kamp) 🔨	2	2	2	0	0	3	X	X	X	X	9

Sheet B	1	2	3	4	5	6	7	8	9	10	Final
British Columbia (Folk)	0	1	0	2	0	0	1	0	0	X	4
Quebec (Charette) 🔨	2	0	5	0	0	1	0	0	3	X	11

Sheet C	1	2	3	4	5	6	7	8	9	10	Final
Manitoba (Meleschuk)	0	1	0	2	0	0	0	2	0	4	9
Northern Ontario (Hackner) 🔨	2	0	1	0	1	0	0	0	2	0	6

Sheet D	1	2	3	4	5	6	7	8	9	10	Final
Prince Edward Island (Weeks)	0	0	2	0	0	2	0	1	0	0	5
New Brunswick (Mitchell) 🔨	0	1	0	2	1	0	1	0	0	1	6

Sheet E	1	2	3	4	5	6	7	8	9	10	11	Final
Alberta (Ryan) 🔨	0	0	1	0	0	0	2	0	2	0	1	6
Ontario (Howard)	0	0	0	2	0	1	0	1	0	1	0	5

=== Draw 13 ===
Sheet A	1	2	3	4	5	6	7	8	9	10	11	Final
New Brunswick (Mitchell) 🔨	1	0	0	0	2	0	1	1	0	1	0	6
Northern Ontario (Hackner)	0	0	2	2	0	1	0	0	1	0	2	8

Sheet B	1	2	3	4	5	6	7	8	9	10	Final
Ontario (Howard) 🔨	3	1	0	2	0	0	1	0	3	X	10
Newfoundland and Labrador (Henderson)	0	0	1	0	1	0	0	1	0	X	3

Sheet C	1	2	3	4	5	6	7	8	9	10	Final
Prince Edward Island (Weeks)	0	0	0	0	0	5	0	1	0	X	6
Yukon/Northwest Territories (Delmage) 🔨	0	0	1	1	1	0	1	0	0	X	4

Sheet D	1	2	3	4	5	6	7	8	9	10	Final
Saskatchewan (Packet)	0	0	0	1	0	1	1	0	0	X	3
Nova Scotia (Kamp) 🔨	0	0	1	0	1	0	0	1	3	X	6

Sheet E	1	2	3	4	5	6	7	8	9	10	Final
Manitoba (Meleschuk)	0	1	0	0	1	0	0	1	1	0	4
British Columbia (Folk) 🔨	2	0	1	1	0	0	1	0	0	1	6

=== Draw 14 ===
Sheet A	1	2	3	4	5	6	7	8	9	10	Final
Prince Edward Island (Weeks)	0	0	1	0	3	0	2	0	2	0	8
Alberta (Ryan) 🔨	0	2	0	2	0	3	0	1	0	1	9

Sheet B	1	2	3	4	5	6	7	8	9	10	11	Final
British Columbia (Folk)	0	1	0	0	0	0	0	1	0	1	2	5
Saskatchewan (Packet) 🔨	0	0	1	1	0	0	0	0	1	0	0	3

Sheet C	1	2	3	4	5	6	7	8	9	10	Final
Ontario (Howard)	0	0	1	0	0	0	X	X	X	X	1
Nova Scotia (Kamp) 🔨	1	3	0	1	1	2	X	X	X	X	8

Sheet D	1	2	3	4	5	6	7	8	9	10	Final
Manitoba (Meleschuk) 🔨	1	0	2	0	0	2	0	3	0	0	8
Quebec (Charette)	0	1	0	2	0	0	2	0	1	1	7

Sheet E	1	2	3	4	5	6	7	8	9	10	Final
Northern Ontario (Hackner)	1	0	2	0	1	0	1	0	1	X	6
Newfoundland and Labrador (Henderson) 🔨	0	2	0	3	0	2	0	1	0	X	8

=== Draw 15 ===
Sheet A	1	2	3	4	5	6	7	8	9	10	11	Final
British Columbia (Folk)	0	2	0	3	0	0	1	0	0	1	0	7
Newfoundland and Labrador (Henderson) 🔨	1	0	2	0	1	0	0	2	1	0	1	8

Sheet B	1	2	3	4	5	6	7	8	9	10	Final
Alberta (Ryan) 🔨	2	0	0	1	1	2	2	X	X	X	8
Northern Ontario (Hackner)	0	1	1	0	0	0	0	X	X	X	2

Sheet C	1	2	3	4	5	6	7	8	9	10	Final
Saskatchewan (Packet)	2	0	3	0	1	0	0	2	0	X	8
Quebec (Charette) 🔨	0	3	0	1	0	1	0	0	0	X	5

Sheet D	1	2	3	4	5	6	7	8	9	10	Final
New Brunswick (Mitchell)	0	1	0	1	0	0	1	0	X	X	3
Yukon/Northwest Territories (Delmage) 🔨	0	0	2	0	1	2	0	3	X	X	8

Sheet E	1	2	3	4	5	6	7	8	9	10	Final
Prince Edward Island (Weeks) 🔨	0	1	0	0	1	0	0	1	1	0	4
Nova Scotia (Kamp)	1	0	1	0	0	2	1	0	0	3	8

== Playoffs ==
Semifinal			Final
			1	Alberta	3
2	British Columbia	7	2	British Columbia	2
3	Ontario	4

=== Semifinal ===
Sheet C	1	2	3	4	5	6	7	8	9	10	Final
British Columbia (Folk) 🔨	0	0	0	2	1	2	0	2	0	X	7
Ontario (Howard)	2	0	0	0	0	0	2	0	0	X	4

Player Percentages
British Columbia		Ontario	
Doug Smith	83%	Kent Carstairs	93%
Rob Koffski	65%	Tim Belcourt	78%
Bert Gretzinger	84%	Glenn Howard	81%
Rick Folk	80%	Russ Howard	64%
Total	78%	Total	79%

=== Final ===
Sheet C	1	2	3	4	5	6	7	8	9	10	Final
Alberta (Ryan) 🔨	0	0	0	1	0	2	0	0	0	0	3
British Columbia (Folk)	0	0	0	0	1	0	1	0	0	0	2

Player Percentages
Alberta		British Columbia	
Don McKenzie	80%	Doug Smith	80%
Don Walchuk	85%	Rob Koffski	83%
Randy Ferbey	79%	Bert Gretzinger	76%
Pat Ryan	93%	Rick Folk	86%
Total	84%	Total	81%

== Statistics ==
=== Top 5 player percentages ===
Round Robin only

Leads	%
(Saskatchewan) Dallas Duce	87
(Alberta) Don McKenzie	84
(New Brunswick) Terry Roach	84
(Ontario) Kent Carstairs	81
(Newfoundland and Labrador) Marc Brophy	81

Seconds	%
(Alberta) Don Walchuk	84
(Newfoundland and Labrador) Peter Hollett	81
(Manitoba) John Hyrich	81
(British Columbia) Rob Koffski	81
(Ontario) Tim Belcourt	80

Thirds	%
(Alberta) Randy Ferbey	81
(British Columbia) Bert Gretzinger	80
(New Brunswick) Brian Dobson	80
(Ontario) Glenn Howard	79
(Quebec) Andre Lafleur	79

Skips	%
(British Columbia) Rick Folk	81
(Alberta) Pat Ryan	81
(Ontario) Russ Howard	81
(Saskatchewan) Jim Packet	80
(Manitoba) Orest Meleschuk	77

=== Team percentages ===
Round Robin only

Province	Skip	%
Alberta	Pat Ryan	82
Saskatchewan	Jim Packet	81
British Columbia	Rick Folk	81
Ontario	Russ Howard	80
Manitoba	Orest Meleschuk	79
New Brunswick	Gary Mitchell	77
Quebec	Pierre Charette	77
Nova Scotia	Ragnar Kamp	77
Northern Ontario	Al Hackner	76
Newfoundland	Lorne Henderson	75
Prince Edward Island	Doug Weeks	75
Yukon	Al Delmage	72
