= Larry Merkley =

Canadian male curler

- Curler ♂

Team
- Curling club: Penetanguishene CC, Penetanguishene, ON

Curling career
- Member Association: Ontario
- Brier: 8: (1980, 1986, 1997, 1989, 1991, 1992, 1993, 1994)
- World Championship: 1 (1993)
Medal record
Curling
Representing Canada
World Championships
Gold medal – first place	1993 Geneva
Representing Ontario
Tim Hortons Brier
Gold medal – first place	1987 Edmonton
Gold medal – first place	1993 Ottawa
Silver medal – second place	1986 Kitchener
Silver medal – second place	1992 Regina
Silver medal – second place	1994 Red Deer
Bronze medal – third place	1989 Saskatoon

Larry C. Merkley (born c. 1943) is a Canadian curler from Penetanguishene, Ontario.

As a youth, Merkley played hockey for the Midland Bruins, winning the "Canadian Little NHL bantam title" in 1953. He also played baseball for the Midland Indians.

He is a 1993 World Men's champion, 1987 and a 1993 Labatt Brier champion.

Merkley works for the Penetanguishene Mental Health Centre.

== Teams ==
Season	Skip	Third	Second	Lead	Alternate	Events
1979–80	Russ Howard	Larry Merkley	Robert Ruston	Kent Carstairs		Brier 1980 (7th)
1982–83	Russ Howard	Glenn Howard	Larry Merkley	Kent Carstairs		
1985–86	Russ Howard	Glenn Howard	Tim Belcourt	Kent Carstairs	Larry Merkley	Brier 1986 (silver)
1986–87	Russ Howard	Glenn Howard	Tim Belcourt	Kent Carstairs	Larry Merkley	Brier 1987 (gold)
1988–89	Russ Howard	Glenn Howard	Tim Belcourt	Kent Carstairs	Larry Merkley	Brier 1989 (bronze)
1990–91	Russ Howard	Glenn Howard	Wayne Middaugh	Peter Corner	Larry Merkley	Brier 1991 (7th)
1991–92	Russ Howard	Glenn Howard	Wayne Middaugh	Peter Corner	Larry Merkley	Brier 1992 (silver)
1992–93	Russ Howard	Glenn Howard	Wayne Middaugh	Peter Corner	Larry Merkley	Brier 1993 (gold); WCC 1993 (gold)
1993–94	Russ Howard	Glenn Howard	Wayne Middaugh	Peter Corner	Larry Merkley	Brier 1994 (silver)
1997–98	Russ Howard	Glenn Howard	Scott Patterson	Phil Loevenmark	Larry Merkley	COCT 1997 (9th)
