= Tim Belcourt =

Canadian curler

- Curler ♂
- Born: July 4, 1962 (age 64); Penetanguishene, ON

Team
- Curling club: Penetanguishene CC, Penetanguishene, ON

Curling career
- Member Association: Ontario
- Brier: 3: (1986, 1987, 1989)
- World Championship: 1 (1987)
Medal record
Curling
Representing Canada
World Championships
Gold medal – first place	1987 Vancouver
Representing Ontario
Labatt Brier
Gold medal – first place	1987 Edmonton
Silver medal – second place	1986 Kitchener
Bronze medal – third place	1989 Saskatoon

Timothy E. Belcourt (born July 4, 1962 in Penetanguishene, Ontario, Canada) is a Canadian curler, 1987 World Men's champion and a 1987 Brier champion.

== Awards ==
- Canadian Curling Hall of Fame: 1991
- Curl Manitoba Hall of Fame: 1991
- Springwater Sports Heritage Hall Of Fame: 2014

== Teams ==
Season	Skip	Third	Second	Lead	Alternate	Coach	Events
1981–82	Tim Belcourt	Arnold McCaulay	Brian Belcourt	Marty Ritchie		Bob Storey	
1985–86	Russ Howard	Glenn Howard	Tim Belcourt	Kent Carstairs	Larry Merkley		Brier 1986 (silver)
1986–87	Russ Howard	Glenn Howard	Tim Belcourt	Kent Carstairs	Larry Merkley (Brier)		Brier 1987 (gold); WCC 1987 (gold); COCT 1987 (4th)
1988–89	Russ Howard	Glenn Howard	Tim Belcourt	Kent Carstairs	Larry Merkley		Brier 1989 (bronze)
1990–91	Tim Belcourt	?	?	?			
1996–97	Tim Belcourt	Kent Carstairs	Kevin Fleming	Randy Mooney			
1998–99	Tim Belcourt	Kent Carstairs	Kevin Fleming	Randy Mooney			
1999–00	Dale Matchett	Tim Belcourt	Gary Rusconi	Randy Moody			
2001–02	Tim Belcourt	?	?	?			
2003–04	Tim Belcourt	?	?	?			
2004–05	Tim Belcourt	?	?	?			
2005–06	Tim Belcourt	?	?	?			
2006–07	Tim Belcourt	?	?	?			
2007–08	Tim Belcourt	Mark Townes	Larry Fleming	Rob Ritchie			
2008–09	Tim Belcourt	Mark Townes	Larry Fleming	Rob Ritchie			
2010–11	Kevin Fleming	Tim Belcourt	Mark Townes	Tim Campbell			
2011–12	Tim Belcourt	Kevin Fleming	Tim Campbell	Larry Fleming			
2016–17	Tim Belcourt	Kevin Fleming	Arnold McAuley	Allan Johnstone			
2017–18	Tim Belcourt	Kevin Fleming	Arnold McAuley	Allan Johnstone			

== Personal life ==
Belcourt grew up in Elmvale, Ontario. He started curling in 1976 when he was 14 years old at Elmvale District High School. After high school, he attended Georgian College, and curled there too.

Belcourt is married and has three daughters. As of 2014, he worked for Point to Point Broadband in Barrie, Ontario.
