= Ron Green (curler) =

Canadian curler (1947 – 2023)

Medal record

Men's Curling

Representing Ontario

Macdonald Brier
Silver medal – second place	1973 Edmonton	
Silver medal – second place	1977 Montreal	
Bronze medal – third place	1974 London	

Ronald Lawrence Leslie Green (April 11, 1947 – December 20, 2023) was a Canadian curler. He played for Ontario in three Briers, Canada's national men's curling championships.

== Early life ==
Green was born at the Toronto General Hospital in 1947 to Robert and Jean Green. He grew up in Scarborough, Ontario where he was a competitive golfer and curler. He also played minor ice hockey, and was on a team with future hall of famer Brad Park.

== Curling career ==
He was a member of the Paul Savage curling rink in the 1970s which won the Ontario Tankard provincial championships in 1973, 1974 and 1977. Green first joined up with Savage as a junior in 1966. Savage moved to Montreal in 1968, but later returned to Ontario and recruited Green to play for him in 1971.

At the 1973 Macdonald Brier, the team finished tied for second with a 6–4 record. Green was named as the event's all-star lead. At the 1974 Macdonald Brier, the team finished with a 6–4 record again, tied for third place. Green was again named as the event's all-star lead. At the 1977 Macdonald Brier, the team finished with an 8–3 record, in a tie for second. Green was playing second that season.

Green left the Savage rink in 1981, citing business commitments, as he was starting a new company, often requiring 70 hour work weeks.

== Personal life ==
He died of mesothelioma in 2023 at St. Peter's Hospital. His mesothelioma is believed to have been attributed to his work at a Johns Manville plant which produced asbestos. After working at the Johns Manville plant, he worked in the printing and manufacturing industry, and created his own business, Grantham Industries. He retired in Florida. He had three children, and was at one point married.
