= Kent Carstairs =

Canadian male curler

- Curler ♂

Team
- Curling club: Penetanguishene CC, Penetanguishene, ON

Curling career
- Member Association: Ontario
- Brier: 4: (1980, 1986, 1987, 1989)
- World Championship: 1 (1987)
Medal record
Curling
Representing Canada
World Championships
| Gold medal – first place | 1987 Vancouver |
Representing Ontario
Labatt Brier
| Gold medal – first place | 1987 Edmonton |
| Silver medal – second place | 1986 Kitchener |
| Bronze medal – third place | 1989 Saskatoon |

Kent A. Carstairs (born c. 1947) is a Canadian curler, 1987 World Men's champion and a 1987 Brier champion.

Carstairs began curling at age 26 in Toronto, Ontario. He moved to Midland, Ontario in 1973 where he teamed up with Russ Howard. He is now a resident of Victoria Harbour, Ontario. He works as an accounts manager for Hughes ELCAN.

== Awards ==
- Canadian Curling Hall of Fame: 1991
- Curl Manitoba Hall of Fame: 1991
- Midland Ontario Sports Hall of Fame:
  - 1996 – Russ Howard Curling Team 1987 World Champions
  - 2002 – 1975-76 Ontario Curling Association Colts Championship Rink

== Teams ==
| Season | Skip | Third | Second | Lead | Alternate | Events |
|---|---|---|---|---|---|---|
| 1975–76 | Russ Howard | Kent Carstairs | Jim Clark | Linden Hurlbut | | |
| 1979–80 | Russ Howard | Larry Merkley | Robert Rushton | Kent Carstairs | | Brier 1980 (7th) |
| 1985–86 | Russ Howard | Glenn Howard | Tim Belcourt | Kent Carstairs | Larry Merkley | Brier 1986 (silver) |
| 1986–87 | Russ Howard | Glenn Howard | Tim Belcourt | Kent Carstairs | Larry Merkley (Brier) | Brier 1987 (gold); WCC 1987 (gold); COCT 1987 (4th) |
| 1988–89 | Russ Howard | Glenn Howard | Tim Belcourt | Kent Carstairs | Larry Merkley | Brier 1989 (bronze) |
| 1996–97 | Tim Belcourt | Kent Carstairs | Kevin Fleming | Randy Mooney | | |
| 1998–99 | Tim Belcourt | Kent Carstairs | Kevin Fleming | Randy Mooney | | |
| 2000–01 | Axel Larsen | Walter Johnson | Gerry Sundwall | Kent Carstairs | | |
| 2001–02 | Axel Larsen | Walter Johnson | Gerry Sundwall | Kent Carstairs | | |
| 2002–03 | Axel Larsen | Walter Johnson | Gerry Sundwall | Kent Carstairs | | |
| 2003–04 | Axel Larsen | Walter Johnson | Gerry Sundwall | Kent Carstairs | | |
| 2004–05 | Axel Larsen | Walter Johnson | Gerry Sundwall | Kent Carstairs | | |
| 2007–08 | Axel Larsen | Walter Johnson | Gerry Sundwall | Kent Carstairs | | |
| 2008–09 | Axel Larsen | Walter Johnson | Gerry Sundwall | Kent Carstairs | | |
| 2009–10 | Axel Larsen | Walter Johnson | Gerry Sundwall | Kent Carstairs | | |
| 2010–11 | Axel Larsen | Walter Johnson | Gerry Sundwall | Kent Carstairs | | |
