= Darrel Sutton =

Canadian curler

- Curler
- Born: July 9, 1947; Lac La Biche, Alberta
- Died: August 2, 2018 (aged 71); Edmonton, Alberta, Canada
Medal record
Macdonald Brier
Representing Alberta
Gold medal – first place	1974 London

Darrel Robert Sutton (July 9, 1947 – August 2, 2018) was a Canadian curler. He played as lead on the Hec Gervais rink that won the 1974 Brier. He owned The Filter Shop in Edmonton, Alberta, Canada.

== Personal life ==
Sutton was born in Lac La Biche, Alberta, Canada, in 1947, to Robert and Beatrice Sutton. He was married to Dorothy Sutton, and lived in Sherwood Park, Alberta. He had two daughters, and four grandchildren.

He died at the age of 71 on August 2, 2018. About a week before his death, Sutton had a massive stroke which left him paralyzed on one side of his body and unable to talk. He died due to complications from the stroke.

== The Filter Shop at BGE ==
Darrel started his company out of the back of his Ford Falcon station Wagon in 1968, and eventually merged with Bud Guthrie Enterprises (BGE). The company was known as BGE Service and Supply, The Filter Shop, until 2013, when the name was changed to The Filter Shop at BGE.

BGE supplies filters and filtration services to Education, Industrial, Government, Oil and Gas, and Residential sectors across western Canada. The Filter Shop has branches in Vancouver, Prince George, Fort McMurray, Calgary, Saskatoon, Winnipeg, and a corporate office in Edmonton.

One of his former employees was Mike Benoit (now retired), father of WWE star Chris Benoit.
