= 1974 Macdonald Brier =

- Host city: London, Ontario
- Arena: London Gardens
- Dates: March 4–9
- Attendance: 48,170
- Winner: Alberta
- Curling club: St. Albert CC, St. Albert
- Skip: Hec Gervais
- Third: Ron Anton
- Second: Warren Hansen
- Lead: Darrel Sutton

The 1974 Macdonald Brier, the Canadian men's national curling championship was held from March 4 to 9, 1974 at the London Gardens in London, Ontario. The total attendance for the week was 48,170.

Team Alberta, who was skipped by Hec Gervais captured the Brier tankard by finishing round robin play 8–2. This was Alberta's twelfth title overall and the second skipped by Gervais, who previously won in 1961.

The Gervais rink would go onto represent Canada in the 1974 Air Canada Silver Broom, the men's world curling championship held in Bern, Switzerland where they lost in the semifinal to Sweden.

Alberta's 4–2 victory over Quebec in Draw 11 set then Brier records for lowest combined score by both teams in one game (6) and most blank ends in one game (7). These records would be Macdonald era (until 1979) records that were matched twice in that era and eventually broken later.

== Event Summary ==
After the Thursday evening draw (Draw 8), there were five teams that were in contention for the championship. Alberta led the way with a 7–1 record with Quebec and Saskatchewan tied for second at 5–2, New Brunswick right behind at 5–3, and Northern Ontario at 4–3.

The Friday afternoon draw saw the standings tighten. First place Alberta lost big to Ontario 12–5, Quebec defeated Newfoundland 9–4, Saskatchewan rolled past Nova Scotia 11–3. Northern Ontario would be eliminated from contention with an 11–6 loss to British Columbia while New Brunswick draw a bye. With Alberta, Quebec, and Saskatchewan all with two losses, this Brier would come down to the last two draws or even a tiebreaker.

The penultimate draw on Friday evening (Draw 10) saw Alberta draw a bye meaning the other three teams could catch some ground heading into Saturday afternoon. However, the only contender who won was Saskatchewan as they beat Newfoundland 8–5. Quebec would lose to Ontario 8–5 while New Brunswick would be eliminated after losing 10–8 to BC. With Saskatchewan's win, both Alberta and Saskatchewan were tied for first with 7–2 records while Quebec sat at 6–3. The final draw would pit Alberta against Quebec while Saskatchewan would play Ontario. Anything from an outright championship, two-way tiebreaker, or a three-way tiebreaker was possible after the final draw.

The featured matchups in the final draw were anti-climatic in different ways. The Ontario and Saskatchewan matchup saw the game tied at 1 after three ends. This is as close as Saskatchewan would get as Ontario scored three in the fourth and stole one the next two ends to take a commanding 6–1 lead through the halfway point. Saskatchewan would attempt a comeback, but Ontario would counter each Saskatchewan score as Ontario would eventually win 11–8 meaning that Saskatchewan would need some help from Quebec to force a three-way tiebreaker.

Alberta and Quebec would be a low-scoring affair as five of the first seven ends were blanked with the score tied at 1. Alberta would break the ice a bit with two in the eighth and taking a 3–1 lead in the process. Quebec cut the lead down to 3–2 in the ninth end. The next two ends were blanked and Alberta would clinch the Brier tankard with a single in the last end for a 4–2 win giving Gervais his first Brier title since 1961.

The official Dominion Curling Association stones were said to be so bad at the event, that nine of the 11 competing skips petitioned to have the rocks replaced (only the skips of New Brunswick and Newfoundland didn't sign, as this had been their first Brier). Sure enough, the rocks would be sold-off that summer, and would never be used at the Brier again.

The 1974 Brier was also the final year where throwers were not allowed to slide past the hog line on their throws. However, after enforcing the rules earlier in the tournament, officials stopped part way through due to backlash from some of the curlers. Then later on, officials changed the rules mid-week to state that curlers could slide over the line as long as they had released the rock first.

== Teams ==
The teams are listed as follows:

Alberta	British Columbia	Manitoba
St. Albert CC, St. Albert Skip: Hec Gervais; Third: Ron Anton; Second: Warren Hansen; Lead: Darrel Sutton	Richmond WC, Richmond Skip: Jim Armstrong; Third: Bernie Sparkes; Second: Gerry Peckham; Lead: Clark Winterton	Glenboro CC, Glenboro Skip: Don Barr; Third: Daniel Hyrich; Second: Jack Fraser; Lead: James Thornborough
New Brunswick	Newfoundland	Northern Ontario
Capital WC, Fredericton Skip: John Clark; Third: Brian Mackin; Second: Shelly Palk; Lead: John Cormier	St. John's CC, St. John's Skip: Fred Wight; Third: Damien Ryan; Second: Douglas Hudson; Lead: Keith Wight	Idylwylde G&CC, Sudbury Skip: John Ross; Third: Frank Bell; Second: Robert Tate; Lead: Russell Tate
Nova Scotia	Ontario	Prince Edward Island
Halifax CC, Halifax Skip: Barry Shearer; Third: Kenneth Langille; Second: Tom Fetterly; Lead: Robert Little	Scarboro G&CC, Scarborough Skip: Paul Savage; Third: Bob Thompson; Second: Ed Werenich; Lead: Ron Green	Charlottetown CC, Charlottetown Skip: Bob Dillon; Third: John Fortier; Second: James Muzika; Lead: Merrill Wiggington
Quebec	Saskatchewan
St. Laurent CC, Mount Royal Skip: Jim Ursel; Third: Bill Ross; Second: Alf Berting; Lead: Freddie Topp	Kindersley CC, Kindersley Skip: Larry McGrath; Third: Ronald St. John; Second: Wayne St. John; Lead: Rodney St. John

== Map of teams ==
Provincial Winners

== Round Robin standings ==
Key
Brier champion

Province	Skip	W	L	PF	PA
Alberta	Hec Gervais	8	2	76	55
Saskatchewan	Larry McGrath	7	3	82	56
Ontario	Paul Savage	6	4	82	64
British Columbia	Jim Armstrong	6	4	82	64
Manitoba	Don Barr	6	4	68	68
Quebec	Jim Ursel	6	4	69	65
New Brunswick	John Clark	5	5	78	70
Northern Ontario	John Ross	4	6	59	80
Prince Edward Island	Bob Dillon	3	7	59	66
Nova Scotia	Barry Shearer	3	7	57	83
Newfoundland	Fred Wight	1	9	52	93

== Round Robin results ==
All draw times are listed in Eastern Standard Time (UTC-05:00).

=== Draw 1 ===
Monday, March 4, 2:00 pm

Team	1	2	3	4	5	6	7	8	9	10	11	12	Final
Alberta (Gervais)	0	1	0	0	2	1	2	0	2	0	0	X	8
Saskatchewan (McGrath)	0	0	0	0	0	0	0	1	0	2	1	X	4

Team	1	2	3	4	5	6	7	8	9	10	11	12	Final
Manitoba (Barr)	1	0	1	0	1	0	1	1	0	0	0	3	8
British Columbia (Armstrong)	0	2	0	0	0	1	0	0	0	1	0	0	4

Team	1	2	3	4	5	6	7	8	9	10	11	12	13	Final
Prince Edward Island (Dillon)	1	0	0	0	0	1	0	0	0	2	0	0	1	5
Ontario (Savage)	0	0	1	0	0	0	1	0	0	0	0	2	0	4

Team	1	2	3	4	5	6	7	8	9	10	11	12	Final
Northern Ontario (Ross)	0	0	1	0	0	1	0	0	0	3	1	1	7
Newfoundland (Wight)	0	1	0	2	0	0	1	1	1	0	0	0	6

Team	1	2	3	4	5	6	7	8	9	10	11	12	Final
New Brunswick (Clark)	1	0	1	0	0	1	0	0	2	0	1	3	9
Nova Scotia (Shearer)	0	1	0	1	0	0	1	1	0	2	0	0	6

=== Draw 2 ===
Monday, March 4, 7:30 pm

Team	1	2	3	4	5	6	7	8	9	10	11	12	Final
British Columbia (Armstrong)	1	2	1	2	1	0	1	2	4	2	X	X	16
Nova Scotia (Shearer)	0	0	0	0	0	1	0	0	0	0	X	X	1

Team	1	2	3	4	5	6	7	8	9	10	11	12	Final
Alberta (Gervais)	0	2	0	1	0	1	0	0	0	1	0	1	6
Prince Edward Island (Dillon)	0	0	1	0	1	0	0	1	0	0	0	0	3

Team	1	2	3	4	5	6	7	8	9	10	11	12	Final
New Brunswick (Clark)	0	0	2	1	2	0	0	2	0	2	2	X	11
Newfoundland (Wight)	1	1	0	0	0	2	0	0	0	0	0	X	4

Team	1	2	3	4	5	6	7	8	9	10	11	12	Final
Northern Ontario (Ross)	0	3	1	1	0	1	0	1	0	0	0	2	9
Ontario (Savage)	1	0	0	0	1	0	1	0	0	1	1	0	5

Team	1	2	3	4	5	6	7	8	9	10	11	12	13	Final
Saskatchewan (McGrath)	0	1	0	0	0	0	0	2	0	0	1	0	0	4
Quebec (Ursel)	0	0	1	0	0	1	0	0	1	0	0	1	1	5

=== Draw 3 ===
Tuesday, March 5, 9:00 am

Team	1	2	3	4	5	6	7	8	9	10	11	12	Final
Quebec (Ursel)	2	1	1	1	1	0	3	0	0	0	0	X	9
Prince Edward Island (Dillon)	0	0	0	0	0	1	0	1	2	0	1	X	5

Team	1	2	3	4	5	6	7	8	9	10	11	12	Final
Northern Ontario (Ross)	0	1	0	0	1	0	0	0	1	0	X	X	3
Alberta (Gervais)	1	0	2	0	0	2	4	2	0	3	X	X	14

Team	1	2	3	4	5	6	7	8	9	10	11	12	Final
Newfoundland (Wight)	0	1	0	1	0	0	1	0	0	0	X	X	3
British Columbia (Armstrong)	1	0	1	0	1	2	0	1	2	2	X	X	10

Team	1	2	3	4	5	6	7	8	9	10	11	12	Final
Manitoba (Barr)	0	0	0	1	0	0	1	0	3	0	0	1	6
Nova Scotia (Shearer)	0	1	0	0	0	1	0	1	0	1	0	0	4

Team	1	2	3	4	5	6	7	8	9	10	11	12	Final
Ontario (Savage)	0	1	0	0	1	0	4	0	0	2	0	X	8
New Brunswick (Clark)	2	0	1	0	0	1	0	0	1	0	1	X	6

=== Draw 4 ===
Tuesday, March 5, 2:00 pm

Team	1	2	3	4	5	6	7	8	9	10	11	12	Final
Saskatchewan (McGrath)	0	0	0	1	0	0	2	1	3	0	1	X	8
Prince Edward Island (Dillon)	0	2	0	0	1	1	0	0	0	0	0	X	4

Team	1	2	3	4	5	6	7	8	9	10	11	12	Final
Northern Ontario (Ross)	2	0	3	0	1	0	1	0	1	0	1	0	9
Quebec (Ursel)	0	2	0	2	0	3	0	0	0	1	0	2	10

Team	1	2	3	4	5	6	7	8	9	10	11	12	Final
Newfoundland (Wight)	0	0	0	2	0	0	1	1	0	0	0	X	4
Manitoba (Barr)	2	0	1	0	0	1	0	0	1	1	1	X	7

Team	1	2	3	4	5	6	7	8	9	10	11	12	Final
Ontario (Savage)	1	1	0	0	1	0	2	0	3	0	0	X	8
British Columbia (Armstrong)	0	0	1	0	0	1	0	1	0	0	0	X	3

Team	1	2	3	4	5	6	7	8	9	10	11	12	Final
New Brunswick (Clark)	1	0	1	0	2	0	0	0	0	2	0	2	8
Alberta (Gervais)	0	2	0	2	0	0	0	1	0	0	1	0	6

=== Draw 5 ===
Wednesday, March 6, 2:00 pm

Team	1	2	3	4	5	6	7	8	9	10	11	12	Final
Saskatchewan (McGrath)	0	2	0	3	0	2	1	1	0	3	0	X	12
Northern Ontario (Ross)	2	0	1	0	0	0	0	0	1	0	1	X	5

Team	1	2	3	4	5	6	7	8	9	10	11	12	Final
Alberta (Gervais)	0	2	0	2	0	3	0	0	0	1	0	1	9
British Columbia (Armstrong)	1	0	1	0	2	0	1	1	0	0	1	0	7

Team	1	2	3	4	5	6	7	8	9	10	11	12	Final
Ontario (Savage)	0	2	0	0	0	4	0	0	2	0	2	X	10
Manitoba (Barr)	0	0	0	1	1	0	1	1	0	1	0	X	5

Team	1	2	3	4	5	6	7	8	9	10	11	12	Final
Nova Scotia (Shearer)	2	0	3	2	0	0	0	2	0	3	X	X	12
Newfoundland (Wight)	0	1	0	0	2	1	0	0	1	0	X	X	5

Team	1	2	3	4	5	6	7	8	9	10	11	12	Final
New Brunswick (Clark)	3	0	2	0	1	4	0	0	0	1	0	X	11
Quebec (Ursel)	0	0	0	1	0	0	0	3	1	0	0	X	5

=== Draw 6 ===
Wednesday, March 6, 7:30 pm

Team	1	2	3	4	5	6	7	8	9	10	11	12	Final
Prince Edward Island (Dillon)	0	1	0	1	0	0	0	1	1	0	0	X	4
Northern Ontario (Ross)	2	0	1	0	0	0	2	0	0	0	0	X	5

Team	1	2	3	4	5	6	7	8	9	10	11	12	Final
New Brunswick (Clark)	0	0	0	2	0	1	0	0	0	1	0	X	4
Saskatchewan (McGrath)	1	0	0	0	2	0	2	0	0	0	2	X	7

Team	1	2	3	4	5	6	7	8	9	10	11	12	Final
Alberta (Gervais)	2	0	2	0	1	0	1	0	2	0	2	X	10
Manitoba (Barr)	0	1	0	1	0	1	0	1	0	2	0	X	6

Team	1	2	3	4	5	6	7	8	9	10	11	12	Final
British Columbia (Armstrong)	0	1	0	1	0	0	1	0	1	4	0	0	8
Quebec (Ursel)	0	0	1	0	1	1	0	1	0	0	0	0	4

Team	1	2	3	4	5	6	7	8	9	10	11	12	13	Final
Nova Scotia (Shearer)	0	0	0	0	1	1	0	0	1	0	2	1	1	7
Ontario (Savage)	0	1	2	2	0	0	0	0	0	1	0	0	0	6

=== Draw 7 ===
Thursday, March 7, 2:00 pm

Team	1	2	3	4	5	6	7	8	9	10	11	12	Final
British Columbia (Armstrong)	1	0	0	0	0	0	1	3	0	1	0	0	6
Saskatchewan (McGrath)	0	1	0	0	0	0	0	0	2	0	4	4	11

Team	1	2	3	4	5	6	7	8	9	10	11	12	Final
Quebec (Ursel)	1	1	0	3	0	0	3	0	1	0	0	0	9
Manitoba (Barr)	0	0	2	0	2	0	0	1	0	1	1	1	8

Team	1	2	3	4	5	6	7	8	9	10	11	12	Final
Alberta (Gervais)	1	0	2	1	0	0	0	3	0	0	0	X	7
Nova Scotia (Shearer)	0	1	0	0	1	1	0	0	0	1	1	X	5

Team	1	2	3	4	5	6	7	8	9	10	11	12	13	Final
Prince Edward Island (Dillon)	0	2	0	1	2	0	0	0	0	1	0	1	0	7
New Brunswick (Clark)	0	0	2	0	0	1	2	1	0	0	1	0	1	8

Team	1	2	3	4	5	6	7	8	9	10	11	12	13	Final
Newfoundland (Wight)	1	0	2	2	0	2	0	0	1	2	0	0	1	11
Ontario (Savage)	0	1	0	0	1	0	1	2	0	0	3	2	0	10

=== Draw 8 ===
Thursday, March 7, 7:30 pm

Team	1	2	3	4	5	6	7	8	9	10	11	12	Final
Quebec (Ursel)	1	1	2	0	4	0	1	0	2	0	X	X	11
Nova Scotia (Shearer)	0	0	0	1	0	1	0	1	0	1	X	X	4

Team	1	2	3	4	5	6	7	8	9	10	11	12	Final
British Columbia (Armstrong)	1	0	2	0	0	0	0	1	2	0	0	1	7
Prince Edward Island (Dillon)	0	1	0	2	1	1	0	0	0	1	0	0	6

Team	1	2	3	4	5	6	7	8	9	10	11	12	Final
Northern Ontario (Ross)	0	0	2	0	0	2	0	1	0	0	2	X	7
New Brunswick (Clark)	0	1	0	1	0	0	0	0	2	0	0	X	4

Team	1	2	3	4	5	6	7	8	9	10	11	12	Final
Newfoundland (Wight)	0	2	0	1	0	0	0	1	0	0	1	X	5
Alberta (Gervais)	1	0	1	0	1	1	0	0	2	1	0	X	7

Team	1	2	3	4	5	6	7	8	9	10	11	12	Final
Manitoba (Barr)	0	0	0	2	0	0	2	0	0	1	0	X	5
Saskatchewan (McGrath)	1	2	2	0	1	1	0	0	1	0	1	X	9

=== Draw 9 ===
Friday, March 8, 2:00 pm

Team	1	2	3	4	5	6	7	8	9	10	11	12	Final
Northern Ontario (Ross)	0	0	0	1	0	0	2	0	1	1	1	X	6
British Columbia (Armstrong)	1	1	4	0	2	0	0	3	0	0	0	X	11

Team	1	2	3	4	5	6	7	8	9	10	11	12	Final
Manitoba (Barr)	0	1	0	0	3	0	1	1	0	0	0	2	8
Prince Edward Island (Dillon)	1	0	2	1	0	1	0	0	1	0	0	0	6

Team	1	2	3	4	5	6	7	8	9	10	11	12	Final
Ontario (Savage)	2	0	0	1	0	2	3	0	1	3	X	X	12
Alberta (Gervais)	0	0	2	0	1	0	0	2	0	0	X	X	5

Team	1	2	3	4	5	6	7	8	9	10	11	12	Final
Saskatchewan (McGrath)	0	2	0	0	0	2	0	2	2	0	3	X	11
Nova Scotia (Shearer)	0	0	0	1	1	0	1	0	0	0	0	X	3

Team	1	2	3	4	5	6	7	8	9	10	11	12	Final
Quebec (Ursel)	2	0	0	2	0	0	1	0	0	3	1	X	9
Newfoundland (Wight)	0	0	1	0	1	0	0	0	2	0	0	X	4

=== Draw 10 ===
Friday, March 8, 7:30 pm

Team	1	2	3	4	5	6	7	8	9	10	11	12	Final
Nova Scotia (Shearer)	1	0	0	0	1	0	1	1	1	0	1	0	6
Prince Edward Island (Dillon)	0	0	0	1	0	2	0	0	0	2	0	2	7

Team	1	2	3	4	5	6	7	8	9	10	11	12	Final
Manitoba (Barr)	0	1	1	1	0	0	0	0	0	0	1	1	5
Northern Ontario (Ross)	1	0	0	0	0	0	2	0	0	0	0	0	3

Team	1	2	3	4	5	6	7	8	9	10	11	12	Final
Ontario (Savage)	0	0	2	0	2	0	0	1	1	0	2	X	8
Quebec (Ursel)	2	0	0	1	0	0	1	0	0	1	0	X	5

Team	1	2	3	4	5	6	7	8	9	10	11	12	Final
New Brunswick (Clark)	2	0	0	2	0	0	1	0	1	0	2	X	8
British Columbia (Armstrong)	0	1	1	0	1	2	0	1	0	4	0	X	10

Team	1	2	3	4	5	6	7	8	9	10	11	12	Final
Saskatchewan (McGrath)	0	2	0	0	1	1	0	2	0	2	0	X	8
Newfoundland (Wight)	1	0	0	2	0	0	1	0	1	0	0	X	5

=== Draw 11 ===
Saturday, March 9, 1:00 pm

Team	1	2	3	4	5	6	7	8	9	10	11	12	Final
Alberta (Gervais)	0	1	0	0	0	0	0	2	0	0	0	1	4
Quebec (Ursel)	0	0	0	0	0	1	0	0	1	0	0	0	2

Team	1	2	3	4	5	6	7	8	9	10	11	12	Final
Ontario (Savage)	0	1	0	3	1	1	0	3	0	1	0	1	11
Saskatchewan (McGrath)	0	0	1	0	0	0	2	0	3	0	2	0	8

Team	1	2	3	4	5	6	7	8	9	10	11	12	Final
Manitoba (Barr)	1	2	0	0	1	0	1	1	0	2	2	0	10
New Brunswick (Clark)	0	0	1	2	0	4	0	0	1	0	0	1	9

Team	1	2	3	4	5	6	7	8	9	10	11	12	Final
Nova Scotia (Shearer)	2	0	0	1	0	2	0	1	0	0	2	1	9
Northern Ontario (Ross)	0	1	0	0	0	0	0	0	1	3	0	0	5

Team	1	2	3	4	5	6	7	8	9	10	11	12	Final
Prince Edward Island (Dillon)	1	0	4	0	1	0	1	1	1	0	3	X	12
Newfoundland (Wight)	0	2	0	1	0	1	0	0	0	1	0	X	5

== Awards ==
=== All-Star Team ===
The media selected the following curlers as All-Stars.

Position	Name	Team
Skip	Jim Ursel	Quebec
Third	Ron Anton	Alberta
Second	Gerry Peckham	British Columbia
Lead	Ron Green (2)	Ontario

=== Ross G.L. Harstone Award ===
The Ross Harstone Award was presented to the player chosen by their fellow peers as the curler who best represented Harstone's high ideals of good sportsmanship, observance of the rules, exemplary conduct and curling ability.

Name	Team	Position
Larry McGrath	Saskatchewan	Skip
