= Line judge =

Line judge can refer to the following:

- Line judge (tennis), an official in tennis to observe the passage of tennis balls over the boundary lines of the court
  - Electronic line judge, an electronic system used in tennis to automatically detect where a ball has landed on the court
- Line judge (gridiron football), an official in gridiron football responsible for the line of scrimmage and sideline fouls
