= 1987 Labatt Brier =

- Host city: Edmonton, Alberta
- Arena: Northlands Agricom
- Dates: March 8–15
- Attendance: 66,793
- Winner: Ontario
- Curling club: Penetanguishene CC, Penetanguishene
- Skip: Russ Howard
- Third: Glenn Howard
- Second: Tim Belcourt
- Lead: Kent Carstairs
- Alternate: Larry Merkley
- Finalist: British Columbia (Bernie Sparkes)

The 1987 Labatt Brier, the Canadian men's curling championship, was held from March 8 to 15 at the Northlands Agricom in Edmonton, Alberta.

Russ Howard of Ontario defeated Bernie Sparkes of British Columbia to win his first Brier title.

== Teams ==
Alberta	British Columbia	Manitoba
Ottewell CC, Edmonton Skip: Pat Ryan; Third: Randy Ferbey; Second: Don Walchuk; Lead: Roy Hebert; Alternate: Gerry Wilson	Vancouver CC, Vancouver Skip: Bernie Sparkes; Third: Jim Armstrong; Second: Monte Ziola; Lead: Jamie Sexton; Alternate: Al Moore	Brandon CC, Brandon Skip: Brian Fowler; Third: Keith Kyle; Second: Dale Wallace; Lead: Gary Poole; Alternate: Brian Moffat
New Brunswick	Newfoundland	Northern Ontario
Thistle St. Andrews CC, Saint John Skip: Gary Mitchell; Third: Brian Dobson; Second: Mark Armstrong; Lead: Terry Roach; Alternate: Arnie Dobson	St. John's CC, St. John's Skip: Mark Noseworthy; Third: Randy Perry; Second: Eugene Trickett; Lead: Rob Thomas; Alternate: Toby McDonald, Jr.	Fort William CC, Thunder Bay Skip: Larry Pineau; Third: Jack Kallos; Second: Brian Snell; Lead: Bruce Kennedy; Alternate: Ray Skillen
Nova Scotia	Ontario	Prince Edward Island
Stellar CC, Stellarton Skip: Ted Hennigar; Third: Max Rastelli; Second: Chris Fulton; Lead: Greg Hilliard; Alternate: Jimmy Doyle	Penetanguishene CC, Penetanguishene Skip: Russ Howard; Third: Glenn Howard; Second: Tim Belcourt; Lead: Kent Carstairs; Alternate: Larry Merkley	Crapaud CC, Crapaud Skip: Ted MacFadyen; Third: Bill MacFadyen; Second: Mike Coady; Lead: Sandy Foy; Alternate: Dave MacFadyen
Quebec	Saskatchewan	Northwest Territories/Yukon
Thistle CC, Montreal Skip: Kevin Adams; Third: Malcolm Turner; Second: Don Redick; Lead: Ian Journeaux; Alternate: Rob MacLean	Lemberg CC, Lemberg Skip: Don Gardiner; Third: Gary Krupski; Second: Ray Krupski; Lead: Mark Krupski; Alternate: Bob Ellert	Yellowknife CC, Yellowknife Skip: Al Delmage; Third: Roy Giles; Second: Glenn Jackson; Lead: Ron Kapicki; Alternate: Gerald May

== Map of teams ==
Provincial Winners

== Round-robin standings ==
Key
Teams to Playoffs

Province	Skip	W	L	Shot %
Ontario	Russ Howard	9	2	81
British Columbia	Bernie Sparkes	8	3	79
Newfoundland	Mark Noseworthy	8	3	75
Alberta	Pat Ryan	6	5	79
New Brunswick	Gary Mitchell	6	5	76
Manitoba	Brian Fowler	6	5	78
Quebec	Kevin Adams	6	5	80
Northern Ontario	Larry Pineau	5	6	74
Northwest Territories/Yukon	Al Delmage	5	6	73
Prince Edward Island	Ted MacFadyen	4	7	75
Nova Scotia	Ted Hennigar	2	9	75
Saskatchewan	Don Gardiner	1	10	72

== Round-robin results ==
=== Draw 1 ===
Sheet A	1	2	3	4	5	6	7	8	9	10	Final
Ontario (Howard)	0	0	2	0	0	1	0	0	2	0	5
British Columbia (Sparkes) 🔨	2	0	0	1	1	0	2	1	0	1	8

Sheet B	1	2	3	4	5	6	7	8	9	10	Final
Quebec (Adams) 🔨	1	0	1	0	0	2	1	2	0	X	7
Saskatchewan (Gardiner)	0	1	0	0	1	0	0	0	2	X	4

Sheet C	1	2	3	4	5	6	7	8	9	10	Final
Northern Ontario (Pineau)	0	1	0	0	1	0	2	0	1	X	5
Prince Edward Island (MacFadyen) 🔨	2	0	1	0	0	1	0	3	0	X	7

Sheet D	1	2	3	4	5	6	7	8	9	10	Final
Manitoba (Fowler)	2	0	2	0	2	0	0	1	1	0	8
New Brunswick (Mitchell) 🔨	0	2	0	3	0	0	2	0	0	3	10

Sheet E	1	2	3	4	5	6	7	8	9	10	11	Final
Northwest Territories/Yukon (Delmage)	1	0	0	1	0	4	1	0	0	1	0	8
Newfoundland (Noseworthy)	0	0	2	0	1	0	0	2	3	0	4	12

=== Draw 2 ===
Sheet A	1	2	3	4	5	6	7	8	9	10	Final
Northwest Territories/Yukon (Delmage) 🔨	1	3	1	1	1	0	1	1	X	X	9
New Brunswick (Mitchell)	0	0	0	0	0	1	0	0	X	X	1

Sheet B	1	2	3	4	5	6	7	8	9	10	Final
Prince Edward Island (MacFadyen)	0	1	2	0	0	1	0	1	1	X	6
Manitoba (Fowler) 🔨	0	0	0	1	0	0	2	0	0	X	3

Sheet C	1	2	3	4	5	6	7	8	9	10	Final
British Columbia (Sparkes) 🔨	1	1	0	1	0	1	0	0	0	1	5
Newfoundland (Noseworthy)	0	0	1	0	1	0	0	0	1	0	3

Sheet D	1	2	3	4	5	6	7	8	9	10	Final
Ontario (Howard) 🔨	0	2	1	0	6	0	0	2	X	X	11
Northern Ontario (Pineau)	1	0	0	2	0	2	0	0	X	X	5

Sheet E	1	2	3	4	5	6	7	8	9	10	Final
Nova Scotia (Hennigar)	0	0	0	1	0	0	X	X	X	X	1
Alberta (Ryan)	0	0	4	0	2	4	X	X	X	X	10

=== Draw 3 ===
Sheet C	1	2	3	4	5	6	7	8	9	10	Final
Northern Ontario (Pineau) 🔨	2	0	0	0	1	0	1	0	6	X	10
British Columbia (Sparkes)	0	0	1	1	0	2	0	1	0	X	5

Sheet D	1	2	3	4	5	6	7	8	9	10	Final
Prince Edward Island (MacFadyen)	0	1	1	0	1	0	X	X	X	X	3
Ontario (Howard) 🔨	2	0	0	3	0	5	X	X	X	X	10

=== Draw 4 ===
Sheet A	1	2	3	4	5	6	7	8	9	10	Final
Northern Ontario (Pineau)	0	1	0	3	0	0	0	2	2	0	8
Manitoba (Fowler) 🔨	2	0	2	0	0	2	1	0	0	3	10

Sheet B	1	2	3	4	5	6	7	8	9	10	Final
Newfoundland (Noseworthy) 🔨	3	2	0	1	1	0	0	3	X	X	10
Nova Scotia (Hennigar)	0	0	0	0	0	0	3	0	X	X	3

Sheet C	1	2	3	4	5	6	7	8	9	10	Final
New Brunswick (Mitchell)	3	0	0	1	0	0	1	1	0	2	8
Saskatchewan (Gardiner) 🔨	0	2	1	0	1	1	0	0	2	0	7

Sheet D	1	2	3	4	5	6	7	8	9	10	Final
Northwest Territories/Yukon (Delmage) 🔨	2	0	6	0	0	1	0	0	0	X	9
Alberta (Ryan)	0	1	0	0	1	0	2	1	1	X	6

Sheet E	1	2	3	4	5	6	7	8	9	10	Final
Prince Edward Island (MacFadyen) 🔨	1	0	0	0	2	0	1	0	2	1	7
Quebec (Adams)	0	0	2	1	0	4	0	2	0	0	9

=== Draw 5 ===
Sheet A	1	2	3	4	5	6	7	8	9	10	Final
Saskatchewan (Gardiner) 🔨	0	0	0	0	1	0	0	1	0	X	2
Newfoundland (Noseworthy)	0	0	0	0	0	0	1	0	3	X	4

Sheet B	1	2	3	4	5	6	7	8	9	10	11	Final
Alberta (Ryan)	1	0	2	0	1	0	0	1	0	2	2	9
New Brunswick (Mitchell) 🔨	0	1	0	1	0	3	1	0	1	0	0	7

Sheet C	1	2	3	4	5	6	7	8	9	10	Final
Nova Scotia (Hennigar)	0	1	0	0	0	1	0	0	2	X	4
Northwest Territories/Yukon (Delmage) 🔨	2	0	2	1	2	0	0	2	0	X	9

Sheet D	1	2	3	4	5	6	7	8	9	10	Final
British Columbia (Sparkes)	0	0	0	2	0	1	0	2	1	X	6
Quebec (Adams) 🔨	3	0	1	0	1	0	2	0	0	X	7

Sheet E	1	2	3	4	5	6	7	8	9	10	Final
Manitoba (Fowler) 🔨	0	0	2	0	1	1	0	1	0	0	5
Ontario (Howard)	1	0	0	2	0	0	2	0	1	3	9

=== Draw 6 ===
Sheet B	1	2	3	4	5	6	7	8	9	10	Final
Manitoba (Fowler) 🔨	2	2	2	0	1	2	0	0	X	X	9
Northwest Territories/Yukon (Delmage)	0	0	0	3	0	0	1	0	X	X	4

Sheet C	1	2	3	4	5	6	7	8	9	10	Final
Newfoundland (Noseworthy) 🔨	3	0	1	0	0	1	0	0	2	X	7
New Brunswick (Mitchell)	0	1	0	1	1	0	1	0	0	X	4

=== Draw 7 ===
Sheet A	1	2	3	4	5	6	7	8	9	10	Final
Prince Edward Island (MacFadyen) 🔨	1	2	0	0	0	3	0	1	0	X	7
Alberta (Ryan)	0	0	0	0	1	0	3	0	1	X	5

Sheet B	1	2	3	4	5	6	7	8	9	10	Final
Northern Ontario (Pineau) 🔨	1	0	1	0	0	1	1	0	0	X	4
Newfoundland (Noseworthy)	0	2	0	2	3	0	0	1	2	X	10

Sheet C	1	2	3	4	5	6	7	8	9	10	Final
Quebec (Adams) 🔨	1	0	0	0	0	2	0	0	0	X	3
Manitoba (Fowler)	0	1	0	1	1	0	1	0	2	X	6

Sheet D	1	2	3	4	5	6	7	8	9	10	Final
Nova Scotia (Hennigar)	0	0	0	0	1	0	1	0	0	X	2
Ontario (Howard) 🔨	0	0	2	0	0	1	0	1	2	X	6

Sheet E	1	2	3	4	5	6	7	8	9	10	Final
Saskatchewan (Gardiner) 🔨	0	0	0	0	1	0	0	1	0	X	2
British Columbia (Sparkes)	0	1	1	1	0	1	1	0	3	X	8

=== Draw 8 ===
Sheet A	1	2	3	4	5	6	7	8	9	10	Final
Quebec (Adams) 🔨	0	3	0	2	0	2	1	0	0	X	8
Nova Scotia (Hennigar)	1	0	1	0	2	0	0	1	0	X	5

Sheet B	1	2	3	4	5	6	7	8	9	10	Final
British Columbia (Sparkes) 🔨	1	0	0	0	2	1	0	0	1	X	5
Alberta (Ryan)	0	0	3	2	0	0	2	1	0	X	8

Sheet C	1	2	3	4	5	6	7	8	9	10	Final
Saskatchewan (Gardiner) 🔨	1	1	1	0	1	0	2	0	1	X	7
Ontario (Howard)	0	0	0	3	0	2	0	3	0	X	8

Sheet D	1	2	3	4	5	6	7	8	9	10	Final
Northwest Territories/Yukon (Delmage) 🔨	1	0	0	2	0	0	3	0	1	1	8
Prince Edward Island (MacFadyen)	0	3	2	0	0	1	0	1	0	0	7

Sheet E	1	2	3	4	5	6	7	8	9	10	Final
Northern Ontario (Pineau)	0	0	1	0	1	1	0	0	2	0	5
New Brunswick (Mitchell) 🔨	1	1	0	2	0	0	0	1	0	1	6

=== Draw 9 ===
Sheet C	1	2	3	4	5	6	7	8	9	10	11	Final
Quebec (Adams) 🔨	2	0	1	0	2	0	1	0	1	0	2	9
Alberta (Ryan)	0	1	0	2	0	1	0	2	0	1	0	7

Sheet D	1	2	3	4	5	6	7	8	9	10	Final
Saskatchewan (Gardiner) 🔨	1	0	1	0	0	0	0	1	3	X	6
Nova Scotia (Hennigar)	0	1	0	1	0	1	1	0	0	X	4

=== Draw 10 ===
Sheet A	1	2	3	4	5	6	7	8	9	10	11	Final
British Columbia (Sparkes) 🔨	2	0	2	0	0	3	0	2	0	0	1	10
Northwest Territories/Yukon (Delmage)	0	1	0	2	1	0	2	0	2	1	0	9

Sheet B	1	2	3	4	5	6	7	8	9	10	Final
New Brunswick (Mitchell) 🔨	1	0	4	0	1	0	1	0	2	X	9
Ontario (Howard)	0	1	0	0	0	2	0	2	0	X	5

Sheet C	1	2	3	4	5	6	7	8	9	10	Final
Manitoba (Fowler) 🔨	1	1	2	0	0	0	1	0	0	2	7
Nova Scotia (Hennigar)	0	0	0	3	0	1	0	0	1	0	5

Sheet D	1	2	3	4	5	6	7	8	9	10	Final
Northern Ontario (Pineau) 🔨	1	0	0	3	0	0	0	2	0	0	6
Alberta (Ryan)	0	1	2	0	1	0	1	0	0	2	7

Sheet E	1	2	3	4	5	6	7	8	9	10	11	Final
Newfoundland (Noseworthy)	1	0	0	0	2	0	2	0	2	0	1	8
Prince Edward Island (MacFadyen) 🔨	0	0	2	0	0	1	0	2	0	2	0	7

=== Draw 11 ===
Sheet A	1	2	3	4	5	6	7	8	9	10	Final
New Brunswick (Mitchell) 🔨	1	1	0	3	0	2	0	1	0	X	8
Prince Edward Island (MacFadyen)	0	0	1	0	1	0	3	0	1	X	6

Sheet B	1	2	3	4	5	6	7	8	9	10	Final
Saskatchewan (Gardiner)	0	1	0	0	0	0	X	X	X	X	1
Northern Ontario (Pineau) 🔨	1	0	3	1	0	4	X	X	X	X	9

Sheet C	1	2	3	4	5	6	7	8	9	10	Final
Ontario (Howard) 🔨	0	1	1	0	0	2	1	0	2	X	7
Newfoundland (Noseworthy)	1	0	0	0	0	0	0	0	0	X	1

Sheet D	1	2	3	4	5	6	7	8	9	10	Final
Quebec (Adams) 🔨	0	0	2	0	1	1	2	0	3	X	9
Northwest Territories/Yukon (Delmage)	0	1	0	2	0	0	0	1	0	X	4

Sheet E	1	2	3	4	5	6	7	8	9	10	Final
British Columbia (Sparkes)	0	0	0	4	0	2	0	1	0	X	7
Manitoba (Fowler) 🔨	1	0	1	0	1	0	1	0	0	X	4

=== Draw 12 ===
Sheet A	1	2	3	4	5	6	7	8	9	10	Final
Manitoba (Fowler)	1	1	1	0	0	3	1	0	0	X	7
Saskatchewan (Gardiner) 🔨	0	0	0	0	1	0	0	1	1	X	3

Sheet B	1	2	3	4	5	6	7	8	9	10	Final
Nova Scotia (Hennigar)	0	1	0	0	1	0	0	1	X	X	3
British Columbia (Sparkes) 🔨	3	0	2	1	0	0	1	0	X	X	7

Sheet C	1	2	3	4	5	6	7	8	9	10	Final
New Brunswick (Mitchell)	0	0	0	1	0	3	0	2	0	1	7
Quebec (Adams) 🔨	1	0	0	0	1	0	2	0	1	0	5

Sheet D	1	2	3	4	5	6	7	8	9	10	11	12	Final
Alberta (Ryan)	0	3	0	2	0	0	0	1	0	1	0	0	7
Newfoundland (Noseworthy) 🔨	3	0	1	0	0	1	0	0	2	0	0	2	9

Sheet E	1	2	3	4	5	6	7	8	9	10	11	Final
Ontario (Howard)	0	0	1	1	1	0	0	2	0	2	1	8
Northwest Territories/Yukon (Delmage) 🔨	2	1	0	0	0	1	1	0	2	0	0	7

=== Draw 13 ===
Sheet A	1	2	3	4	5	6	7	8	9	10	Final
Newfoundland (Noseworthy)	0	1	1	1	0	2	0	3	0	X	8
Quebec (Adams) 🔨	1	0	0	0	1	0	2	0	2	X	6

Sheet B	1	2	3	4	5	6	7	8	9	10	Final
Northwest Territories/Yukon (Delmage) 🔨	0	1	0	1	1	0	1	0	X	X	4
Northern Ontario (Pineau)	1	0	3	0	0	2	0	3	X	X	9

Sheet C	1	2	3	4	5	6	7	8	9	10	Final
Alberta (Ryan) 🔨	2	0	0	1	0	2	0	0	0	1	6
Manitoba (Fowler)	0	1	0	0	1	0	1	1	1	0	5

Sheet D	1	2	3	4	5	6	7	8	9	10	Final
Prince Edward Island (MacFadyen)	0	2	0	1	0	2	1	0	1	1	8
Saskatchewan (Gardiner) 🔨	1	0	1	0	2	0	0	2	0	0	6

Sheet E	1	2	3	4	5	6	7	8	9	10	Final
New Brunswick (Mitchell)	0	0	1	0	2	0	0	1	1	0	5
Nova Scotia (Hennigar) 🔨	0	2	0	2	0	1	1	0	0	1	7

=== Draw 14 ===
Sheet A	1	2	3	4	5	6	7	8	9	10	11	Final
Alberta (Ryan) 🔨	1	0	1	0	1	0	0	0	1	1	0	5
Ontario (Howard)	0	1	0	1	0	0	2	1	0	0	3	8

Sheet B	1	2	3	4	5	6	7	8	9	10	Final
Nova Scotia (Hennigar)	0	0	1	0	0	2	0	1	1	1	6
Prince Edward Island (MacFadyen) 🔨	1	0	0	1	1	0	2	0	0	0	5

Sheet C	1	2	3	4	5	6	7	8	9	10	Final
Northwest Territories/Yukon (Delmage) 🔨	0	2	0	0	0	2	0	1	0	1	6
Saskatchewan (Gardiner)	1	0	1	0	1	0	1	0	1	0	5

Sheet D	1	2	3	4	5	6	7	8	9	10	Final
New Brunswick (Mitchell)	0	0	3	0	1	0	1	1	0	X	6
British Columbia (Sparkes) 🔨	1	1	0	2	0	3	0	0	3	X	10

Sheet E	1	2	3	4	5	6	7	8	9	10	11	Final
Quebec (Adams) 🔨	2	0	1	0	0	1	0	0	0	1	0	5
Northern Ontario (Pineau)	0	1	0	0	1	0	2	1	0	0	1	6

=== Draw 15 ===
Sheet A	1	2	3	4	5	6	7	8	9	10	Final
Nova Scotia (Hennigar)	0	2	0	2	0	2	0	1	0	X	7
Northern Ontario (Pineau) 🔨	2	0	2	0	2	0	3	0	1	X	10

Sheet B	1	2	3	4	5	6	7	8	9	10	Final
Ontario (Howard)	0	2	0	2	0	0	0	0	0	1	5
Quebec (Adams) 🔨	2	0	1	0	0	0	0	1	0	0	4

Sheet C	1	2	3	4	5	6	7	8	9	10	Final
Prince Edward Island (MacFadyen) 🔨	0	1	0	1	0	1	0	X	X	X	3
British Columbia (Sparkes)	0	0	2	0	3	0	3	X	X	X	8

Sheet D	1	2	3	4	5	6	7	8	9	10	Final
Newfoundland (Noseworthy) 🔨	1	0	2	0	0	1	0	0	0	X	4
Manitoba (Fowler)	0	1	0	1	1	0	2	2	0	X	7

Sheet E	1	2	3	4	5	6	7	8	9	10	Final
Alberta (Ryan) 🔨	0	2	0	1	2	0	2	0	1	X	8
Saskatchewan (Gardiner)	0	0	1	0	0	1	0	0	0	X	2

== Playoffs ==
Semifinal			Final
			1	Ontario	11
2	British Columbia	8	2	British Columbia	7
3	Newfoundland	6

=== Semifinal ===
Sheet C	1	2	3	4	5	6	7	8	9	10	Final
British Columbia (Sparkes) 🔨	3	0	1	0	0	0	0	4	0	X	8
Newfoundland (Noseworthy)	0	2	0	1	1	0	1	0	1	X	6

Player percentages
British Columbia		Newfoundland	
Jamie Sexton	70%	Rob Thomas	84%
Monte Ziola	64%	Eugene Trickett	74%
Jim Armstrong	85%	Randy Perry	73%
Bernie Sparkes	70%	Mark Noseworthy	70%
Total	72%	Total	75%

=== Final ===
Sheet C	1	2	3	4	5	6	7	8	9	10	Final
Ontario (Howard) 🔨	1	0	0	1	0	2	0	2	0	5	11
British Columbia (Sparkes)	0	2	0	0	1	0	1	0	3	0	7

Player percentages
Ontario		British Columbia	
Kent Carstairs	84%	Jamie Sexton	76%
Tim Belcourt	84%	Monte Ziola	79%
Glenn Howard	91%	Jim Armstrong	88%
Russ Howard	79%	Bernie Sparkes	83%
Total	84%	Total	81%

== Statistics ==
=== Top 5 player percentages ===
Round Robin only

Leads	%
(Ontario) Kent Carstairs	83
(Quebec) Ian Journeaux	83
(Nova Scotia) Greg Hilliard	81
(Manitoba) Gary Poole	81
(Alberta) Roy Hebert	81

Seconds	%
(Alberta) Don Walchuk	88
(Quebec) Don Redick	83
(Manitoba) Dale Wallace	81
(Ontario) Tim Belcourt	80
(British Columbia) Monte Ziola	78

Thirds	%
(British Columbia) Jim Armstrong	83
(Ontario) Glenn Howard	80
(Quebec) Malcolm Turner	77
(New Brunswick) Brian Dobson	76
(Prince Edward Island) Bill MacFadyen	76

Skips	%
(British Columbia) Bernie Sparkes	80
(Ontario) Russ Howard	80
(Alberta) Pat Ryan	80
(Quebec) Kevin Adams	76
(Manitoba) Brian Fowler	76

=== Team percentages ===
Round Robin only

Province	Skip	%
Alberta	Pat Ryan	81
Ontario	Russ Howard	81
Quebec	Kevin Adams	80
British Columbia	Bernie Sparkes	79
Manitoba	Brian Fowler	78
New Brunswick	Gary Mitchell	76
Newfoundland	Mark Noseworthy	75
Prince Edward Island	Ted MacFadyen	75
Nova Scotia	Ted Hennigar	75
Northern Ontario	Larry Pineau	74
Northwest Territories/Yukon	Al Delmage	73
Saskatchewan	Don Gardiner	72
