= Russ Howard =

Canadian curler (born 1956)

Russ Howard CM, ONL
- Curler
- Born: February 19, 1956 (age 70); Midland, Ontario, Canada

Curling career
- Member Association: Ontario (1979–1998); New Brunswick (1998–2010); Saskatchewan (2020)
- Brier: 14 (1980, 1986, 1987, 1989, 1991, 1992, 1993, 1994, 1999, 2000, 2002, 2003, 2004, 2009)
- Top CTRS ranking: 12th (2004–05)
- Grand Slam victories: 0
Medal record
Men's curling
Representing Canada
Winter Olympics
Gold medal – first place	2006 Turin
World Championships
Gold medal – first place	1987 Vancouver
Gold medal – first place	1993 Geneva
Representing Newfoundland and Labrador
Canadian Olympic Trials
Gold medal – first place	2005 Halifax
Representing Ontario
Labatt Brier
Gold medal – first place	1987 Edmonton
Gold medal – first place	1993 Ottawa
Silver medal – second place	1986 Kitchener
Silver medal – second place	1992 Regina
Silver medal – second place	1994 Red Deer
Bronze medal – third place	1989 Saskatoon
Representing New Brunswick
Labatt/Nokia Brier
Silver medal – second place	2000 Saskatoon
Bronze medal – third place	2002 Calgary

Russell W. Howard, CM, ONL (born February 19, 1956, in Midland, Ontario) is a Canadian curler and Olympic champion, based in Regina, Saskatchewan, but originally from Midland, Ontario. He lived in Moncton, New Brunswick, from 2000 to 2019. Known for his gravelly voice, Howard has been to the Brier 14 times (8 as Ontario, 6 as New Brunswick), winning the title twice (both as Ontario). He is also a two-time world champion, winning in 1987 and 1993. He has also won three TSN Skins Games in 1991, 1992, and 1993, and participated in two Canadian Mixed Curling Championships in 2000 and 2001. He won gold at the 2006 Winter Olympics. He played in two Canadian Senior Curling Championships in 2008 and 2009 finishing with a silver medal both of those years. Russ Howard was inducted into the Ontario Sports Hall of Fame in 2011. He is currently a curling analyst and commentator for TSN’s Season of Champions curling coverage.

== Career ==
In 2005, he joined team Gushue to call the shots for Brad Gushue's team at the Canadian Olympic Trials, while he played second. Howard, along with Gushue (who throws last rocks), lead Jamie Korab and third Mark Nichols, went on to win the trials, giving them the right to represent Canada at the 2006 Winter Olympics, where they won the gold medal, defeating Finland 10–4 in the final match. It was the first time that a Canadian team had won the gold medal for men's curling. Howard, who turned 50 during the Olympics, is also the oldest Canadian to win an Olympic gold medal. The oldest person ever to win a gold medal was Robin Welsh, aged 54, who won gold in curling at the 1924 Winter Olympics.

As a skip (captain), Howard has been in three previous trials (in 1987, 1997, and 2001), but never went on to the Olympics. Howard is also the innovator of the "Moncton Rule", which evolved into the "free guard zone", part of international and Olympic rules. This makes his 2006 medal particularly significant, as it is likely that without the excitement this rule adds to the sport it would not have become an Olympic event in the 1990s.

In the 2009-10 curling season, although he played in bonspiels throughout the year, Howard did not curl in the New Brunswick Tankard due to his broadcasting commitments with The Sports Network (TSN). Howard has been commentating curling events for TSN since 2001.

In 2006, he was inducted into the New Brunswick Sports Hall of Fame. In 2013, he was inducted into Canada's Sports Hall of Fame. He was named a Member of the Order of Canada and inducted into the WCF Hall of Fame in 2015.

=== Brier records ===
At the end of the 2009 Brier, Howard had appeared in more Briers than any other player (14), and played more games at the Brier than any other player (174). The 2012 Brier saw his brother Glenn Howard tying his record for Brier appearances and breaking his record for most career games played at the Brier. As of 2017, Russ had appeared in the second most Brier games ever, behind his brother Glenn.

=== Broadcasting career ===
Howard stepped into the broadcast booth for the first time in 2001, serving as an analyst for TSN’s coverage of the Brier. Since 2008, he has been a mainstay analyst on the network, also providing colour commentary for TSN’s Season of Champions curling.

Howard handled colour commentating duties for Canada’s Olympic Broadcast Media Consortium during the Vancouver 2010 Olympic Winter Games.

== Personal life ==
Howard's grand-aunt, Jean Thompson, was an Olympic runner. His brother, Glenn Howard, is also a well known curler. Howard's daughter, Ashley Howard, is a competitive curler and the executive director of CurlSask, the governing body of curling in Saskatchewan.

Outside of curling, Howard worked as a real estate agent for Royal LePage Atlantic, in addition to his commentator work with TSN, and as a curling coach in Switzerland. He moved to Regina, Saskatchewan in 2019 to be closer to his children.

== Teams ==
Season	Skip	Third	Second	Lead
1979–80	Russ Howard	Larry Merkley	Robert Ruston	Kent Carstairs
1985–86	Russ Howard	Glenn Howard	Tim Belcourt	Kent Carstairs
1986–87	Russ Howard	Glenn Howard	Tim Belcourt	Kent Carstairs
1988–89	Russ Howard	Glenn Howard	Tim Belcourt	Kent Carstairs
1989–90	Russ Howard	Glenn Howard	Wayne Middaugh	Peter Corner
1990–91	Russ Howard	Glenn Howard	Wayne Middaugh	Peter Corner
1991–92	Russ Howard	Glenn Howard	Wayne Middaugh	Peter Corner
1992–93	Russ Howard	Glenn Howard	Wayne Middaugh	Peter Corner
1993–94	Russ Howard	Glenn Howard	Wayne Middaugh	Peter Corner
1994–95	Russ Howard	Glenn Howard	Peter Corner	Ken McDermot
1995–96	Russ Howard	Glenn Howard	Peter Corner	Noel Herron
1996–97	Russ Howard	Glenn Howard	Scott Patterson	Phil Loevenmark
1997–98	Russ Howard	Glenn Howard	Noel Herron	Steve Small
1998–99	Russ Howard	Glenn Howard; Wayne Tallon	Peter Corner; Rick Perron	Neil Harrison; Grant Odishaw
1999–00	Russ Howard	Glenn Howard; Wayne Tallon	Peter Corner; Rick Perron	Neil Harrison; Grant Odishaw
2000–01	Russ Howard	James Grattan	Rick Perron	Grant Odishaw
2001–02	Russ Howard	James Grattan	Marc LeCocq	Grant Odishaw
2002–03	Russ Howard	James Grattan	Marc LeCocq	Grant Odishaw
2003–04	Russ Howard	James Grattan	Marc LeCocq	Grant Odishaw
2004–05	Russ Howard	James Grattan	Grant Odishaw	Marc LeCocq
2005	Russ Howard	Mark Dobson	Steven Howard	Grant Odishaw
2005–06	Brad Gushue (fourth)	Mark Nichols	Russ Howard (skip)	Jamie Korab
2006–07	Russ Howard	Grant Odishaw	Mark Dobson	Steven Howard
2007–08	Russ Howard	Grant Odishaw	Mark Dobson	Steven Howard
2008–09	Russ Howard	James Grattan	Jason Vaughan	Peter Case
2009–10	Russ Howard	James Grattan	Jason Vaughan	Peter Case

== Publications ==
Howard has released two books: Hurry Hard: The Russ Howard Story (2007), an autobiography that vividly describes his journey to becoming an Olympic gold medallist, and Curl to Win (2008).
