= Manitoba tuck =

Curling technique

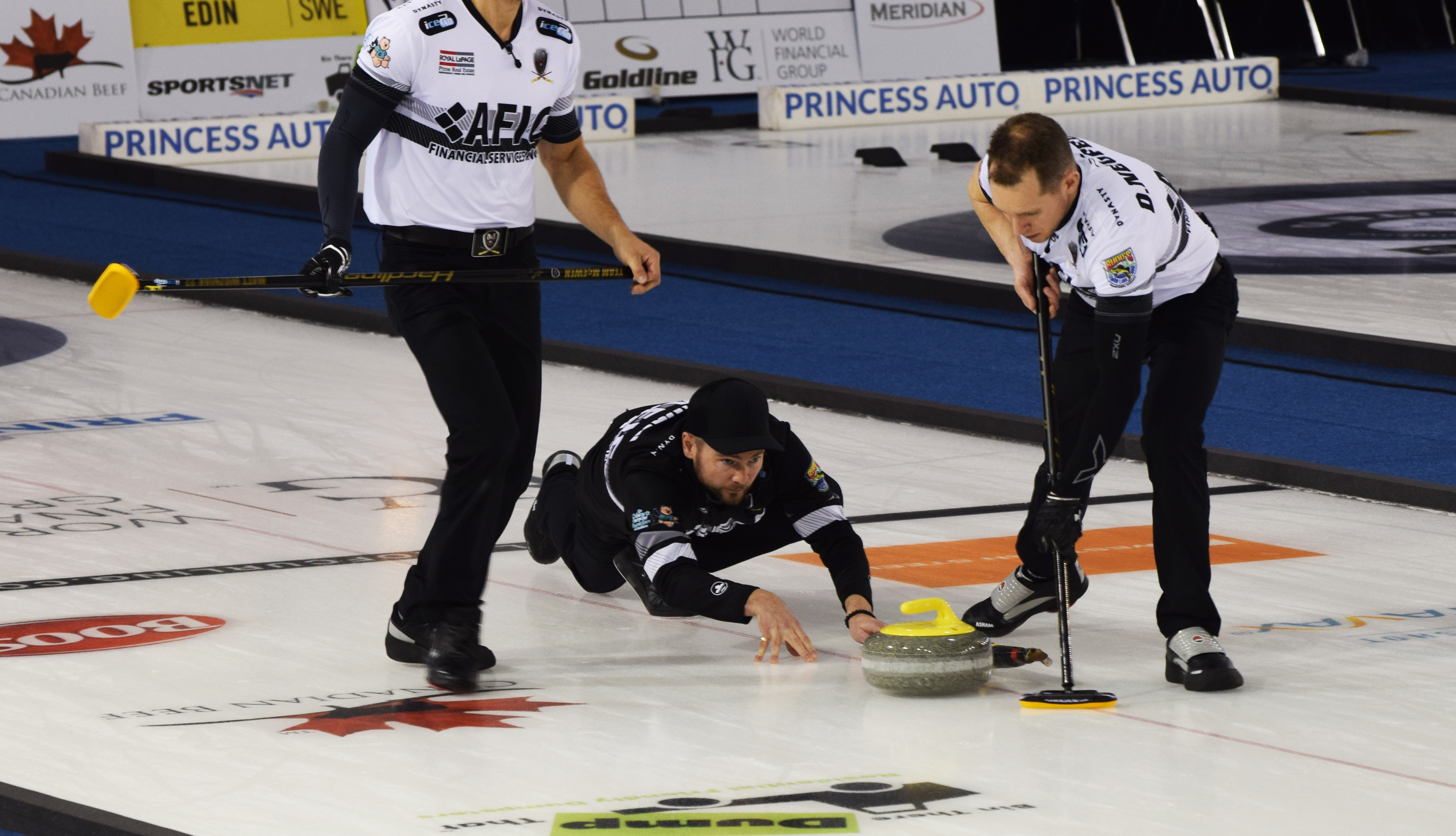
Mike McEwen demonstrating the Manitoba Tuck delivery

The Manitoba tuck is a form of slide in curling. A tuck under is when the curler's front toe is the only part of the slider that comes into contact with the ice as the heel is raised. While the slide is most commonly found in the province of Manitoba, it is a technique used by curlers around the world. Prominent historical curlers include Kerry Burtnyk, Don Duguid, Barry Fry, Vic Peters, and Jeff Stoughton. Historically, Duguid was one of the first to perfect the tuck delivery and began practicing it when he was 9 years old back in the mid 1940s. Tuck sliders may slide with a flat broom or use another delivery aid like a corn broom when sliding.

== Well known curlers ==
- Mike McEwen
- Ryan Fry
- Jason Gunnlaugson
- Matt Dunstone
- Jeff Stoughton
- Kate Cameron
- B.J. Neufeld
