= List of World Men's Curling Champions =

The following is a list of the winners of the World Men's Curling Championship since the inception of the championships in 1959.

Name of fourth, then third, second, lead and alternate (if have) is listed in the team member list. Name of skip is in Bold.

== Medalists ==
Men's World Curling Champions
| Year | Gold | | Silver | | Bronze | |
| Year | Country | Team | Country | Team | Country | Team |
|---|---|---|---|---|---|---|
| 1959 | Canada | **Ernie Richardson**; Arnold Richardson; Sam Richardson; Wes Richardson | Scotland | **Willie Young**; John Pearson; Jimmy Scott; Bobby Young | —N/a | |
| 1960 | Canada | **Ernie Richardson**; Arnold Richardson; Sam Richardson; Wes Richardson | Scotland | **Hugh Neilson**; Watson Yuill; Tom Yuill; Andrew Wilson | —N/a | |
| 1961 | Canada | **Hec Gervais**; Ray Werner; Vic Raymer; Wally Ursuliak | Scotland | **Willie McIntosh**; Andrew McLaren; Jim Miller; Bob Stirrat | United States | **Frank Crealock**; Ken Sherwood; John Jamieson; Bud McCartney |
| 1962 | Canada | **Ernie Richardson**; Arnold Richardson; Sam Richardson; Wes Richardson | United States | **Dick Brown**; Terry Kleffman; Fran Kleffman; Nick Jerulle | Scotland | **Willie Young**; John Pearson; Sandy Anderson; Bobby Young |
| 1963 | Canada | **Ernie Richardson**; Arnold Richardson; Sam Richardson; Mel Perry | Scotland | **Chuck Hay**; John Bryden; Alan Glen; Jimmy Hamilton | United States | **Mike Slyziuk**; Nelson Brown; Ernie Slyziuk; Walter Hubchick |
| 1964 | Canada | **Lyall Dagg**; Leo Hebert; Fred Britton; Barry Naimark | Scotland | **Alex F. Torrance**; Alex A. Torrance; Bobby Kirkland; Jimmy Waddell | United States | **Bob Magie Jr.** Bert Payne; Russell Barber; Britton Payne |
| 1965 | United States | **Bud Somerville**; Bill Strum; Al Gagne; Tom Wright | Canada | **Terry Braunstein**; Don Duguid; Gordon McTavish; Ray Turnbull | Sweden | Tore Rydman; **Gunnar Kullendorf**; Sigurd Rydén; Börje Holmgren |
| 1966 | Canada | **Ron Northcott**; George Fink; Bernie Sparkes; Fred Storey | Scotland | **Chuck Hay**; John Bryden; Alan Glen; David Howie | United States | **Bruce Roberts**; Joe Zbacnik; Gerry Toutant; Mike O'Leary |
| 1967 | Scotland | **Chuck Hay**; John Bryden; Alan Glen; David Howie | Sweden | **Bob Woods**; Totte Åkerlund; Bengt af Kleen; Ove Söderström | United States | **Bruce Roberts**; Tom Fitzpatrick; John Wright; Doug Walker |
| 1968 | Canada | **Ron Northcott**; Jimmy Shields; Bernie Sparkes; Fred Storey | Scotland | **Chuck Hay**; John Bryden; Alan Glen; David Howie | United States | **Bud Somerville**; Bill Strum; Al Gagne; Tom Wright |
| 1969 | Canada | **Ron Northcott**; Dave Gerlach; Bernie Sparkes; Fred Storey | United States | **Bud Somerville**; Bill Strum; Franklin Bradshaw; Gene Ovesen | Scotland | **Bill Muirhead**; George Haggart; Derek Scott; Alec Young |
| 1970 | Canada | **Don Duguid**; Rod Hunter; Jim Pettapiece; Bryan Wood | Scotland | **Bill Muirhead**; George Haggart; Derek Scott; Murray Melville | Sweden | Claes Källén; Christer Källén; Sture Lindén; **Tom Schaeffer** |
| 1971 | Canada | **Don Duguid**; Rod Hunter; Jim Pettapiece; Bryan Wood | Scotland | **James Sanderson**; Willie Sanderson; Iain Baxter; Colin Baxter | United States | **Dale Dalziel**; Dennis Melland; Clark Sampson; Rodney Melland |
| 1972 | Canada | **Orest Meleschuk**; Dave Romano; John Hanesiak; Pat Hailley | United States | **Robert LaBonte**; Frank Aasand; John Aasand; Ray Morgan | West Germany | **Manfred Räderer**; Peter Jacoby; Peder Ledosquet; Hansjörg Jacoby |
| 1973 | Sweden | **Kjell Oscarius**; Bengt Oscarius; Tom Schaeffer; Boa Carlman | Canada | **Harvey Mazinke**; Billy Martin; George Achtymichuk; Dan Klippenstein | France | **Pierre Boan**; André Mabboux; André Tronc; Gérard Pasquier |
| 1974 | United States | **Bud Somerville**; Bob Nichols; Bill Strum; Tom Locken | Sweden | **Jan Ullsten**; Tom Berggren; Anders Grahn; Roger Bredin | Switzerland | **Peter Attinger Jr.** Bernhard Attinger; Mattias Neuenschwander; Jürg Geiler |
| 1975 | Switzerland | **Otto Danieli**; Roland Schneider; Rolf Gautschi; Ueli Mülli | United States | **Ed Risling**; Charles Lundgren; Gary Schnee; Dave Tellvik | Canada | **Bill Tetley**; Rick Lang; Bill Hodgson; Peter Hnatiw |
| 1976 | United States | **Bruce Roberts**; Joe Roberts; Gary Kleffman; Jerry Scott | Scotland | **Bill Muirhead**; Derek Scott; Len Dudman; Roy Sinclair | Switzerland | **Adolf Aerni**; Martin Sägesser; Martin Plüss; Robert Stettler |
| 1977 | Sweden | **Ragnar Kamp**; Håkan Rudström; Björn Rudström; Christer Mårtensson | Canada | **Jim Ursel**; Art Lobel; Don Aitken; Brian Ross | Scotland | **Ken Horton**; Willie Jamieson; Keith Douglas; Richard Harding |
| 1978 | United States | **Bob Nichols**; Bill Strum; Tom Locken; Bob Christman | Norway | **Kristian Sørum**; Morten Sørum; Eigil Ramsfjell; Gunnar Meland | Canada | Ed Lukowich; **Mike Chernoff**; Dave Johnston; Ron Schindle |
| 1979 | Norway | **Kristian Sørum**; Morten Sørum; Eigil Ramsfjell; Gunnar Meland | Switzerland | **Peter Attinger Jr.** Bernhard Attinger; Mattias Neuenschwander; Ruedi Attinger | Canada | **Barry Fry**; Bill Carey; Gordon Sparkes; Bryan Wood |
| 1980 | Canada | **Rick Folk**; Ron Mills; Tom Wilson; Jim Wilson | Norway | **Kristian Sørum**; Eigil Ramsfjell; Gunnar Meland; Harald Ramsfjell | Switzerland | **Jürg Tanner**; Jürg Hornisberger; Franz Tanner; Patrik Lörtscher |
| 1981 | Switzerland | **Jürg Tanner**; Jürg Hornisberger; Patrik Lörtscher; Franz Tanner | United States | Bob Nichols; **Bud Somerville**; Bob Christman; Bob Buchanan | Canada | **Kerry Burtnyk**; Mark Olson; Jim Spencer; Ron Kammerlock |
| 1982 | Canada | **Al Hackner**; Rick Lang; Bob Nicol; Bruce Kennedy; Al Fiskar | Switzerland | **Jürg Tanner**; Jürg Hornisberger; Patrik Lörtscher; Franz Tanner | West Germany | **Keith Wendorf**; Hans Dieter Kiesel; Sven Saile; Heiner Martin |
| 1983 | Canada | **Ed Werenich**; Paul Savage; John Kawaja; Neil Harrison | West Germany | **Keith Wendorf**; Hans Dieter Kiesel; Sven Saile; Heiner Martin | Norway | **Eigil Ramsfjell**; Sjur Loen; Gunnar Meland; Bo Bakke |
| 1984 | Norway | **Eigil Ramsfjell**; Sjur Loen; Gunnar Meland; Bo Bakke | Switzerland | **Peter Attinger Jr.** Bernhard Attinger; Werner Attinger; Kurt Attinger | Sweden | Connie Östlund; **Per Lindeman**; Carl von Wendt; Bo Andersson |
| 1985 | Canada | **Al Hackner**; Rick Lang; Ian Tetley; Pat Perroud | Sweden | **Stefan Hasselborg**; Mikael Hasselborg; Hans Nordin; Lars Wernblom | Denmark | Hans Gufler; **Steen Hansen**; Michael Sindt; Frants Gufler |
| 1986 | Canada | **Ed Lukowich**; John Ferguson; Neil Houston; Brent Syme; Wayne Hart | Scotland | **David Smith**; Hammy McMillan; Mike Hay; Peter Smith; Gregor Smith | United States | **Steve Brown**; Wally Henry; George Godfrey; Richard Maskel; Huns Gustrowsky |
| 1987 | Canada | **Russ Howard**; Glenn Howard; Tim Belcourt; Kent Carstairs | West Germany | **Rodger Gustaf Schmidt**; Wolfgang Burba; Johnny Jahr; Hans-Joachim Burba | Norway | **Eigil Ramsfjell**; Sjur Loen; Morten Søgård; Bo Bakke |
| 1988 | Norway | **Eigil Ramsfjell**; Sjur Loen; Morten Søgård; Bo Bakke | Canada | **Pat Ryan**; Randy Ferbey; Don Walchuk; Don McKenzie | Scotland | **David Smith**; Mike Hay; Peter Smith; David Hay |
| 1989 | Canada | **Pat Ryan**; Randy Ferbey; Don Walchuk; Don McKenzie; Murray Ursulak | Switzerland | **Patrick Hürlimann**; Andreas Hänni; Patrik Lörtscher; Mario Gross | Norway | **Eigil Ramsfjell**; Sjur Loen; Morten Søgård; Bo Bakke; Morten Skaug |
| 1989 | Canada | **Pat Ryan**; Randy Ferbey; Don Walchuk; Don McKenzie; Murray Ursulak | Switzerland | **Patrick Hürlimann**; Andreas Hänni; Patrik Lörtscher; Mario Gross | Sweden | **Thomas Norgren**; Jan-Olov Nässén; Anders Lööf; Mikael Ljungberg; Peter Cederwall |
| 1990 | Canada | **Ed Werenich**; John Kawaja; Ian Tetley; Pat Perroud; Neil Harrison | Scotland | **David Smith**; Mike Hay; Peter Smith; David Hay | Denmark | **Tommy Stjerne**; Per Berg; Peter Andersen; Ivan Frederiksen; Anders Søderblom |
| 1990 | Canada | **Ed Werenich**; John Kawaja; Ian Tetley; Pat Perroud; Neil Harrison | Scotland | **David Smith**; Mike Hay; Peter Smith; David Hay | Sweden | **Lars-Åke Nordström**; Christer Ödling; Peder Flemström; Peter Nenzén; Anders Gidlund |
| 1991 | Scotland | **David Smith**; Graeme Connal; Peter Smith; David Hay; Mike Hay | Canada | **Kevin Martin**; Kevin Park; Dan Petryk; Don Bartlett; Jules Owchar | Norway | **Eigil Ramsfjell**; Sjur Loen; Niclas Järund; Morten Skaug; Dagfinn Loen |
| 1991 | Scotland | **David Smith**; Graeme Connal; Peter Smith; David Hay; Mike Hay | Canada | **Kevin Martin**; Kevin Park; Dan Petryk; Don Bartlett; Jules Owchar | United States | **Steve Brown**; Paul Pustovar; George Godfrey; Wally Henry; Mike Fraboni |
| 1992 | Switzerland | **Markus Eggler**; Frédéric Jean; Stefan Hofer; Björn Schröder | Scotland | **Hammy McMillan**; Norman Brown; Gordon Muirhead; Roger McIntyre | Canada | **Vic Peters**; Dan Carey; Chris Neufeld; Don Rudd |
| 1992 | Switzerland | **Markus Eggler**; Frédéric Jean; Stefan Hofer; Björn Schröder | Scotland | **Hammy McMillan**; Norman Brown; Gordon Muirhead; Roger McIntyre | United States | **Doug Jones**; Jason Larway; Joel Larway; Tom Violette |
| 1993 | Canada | **Russ Howard**; Glenn Howard; Wayne Middaugh; Peter Corner; Larry Merkley | Scotland | **David Smith**; Graeme Connal; Peter Smith; David Hay; Gordon Muirhead | Switzerland | **Dieter Wüest**; Jens Piesbergen; Peter Grendelmeier; Simon Roth; Martin Zürrer |
| 1993 | Canada | **Russ Howard**; Glenn Howard; Wayne Middaugh; Peter Corner; Larry Merkley | Scotland | **David Smith**; Graeme Connal; Peter Smith; David Hay; Gordon Muirhead | United States | **Scott Baird**; Pete Fenson; Mark Haluptzok; Tim Johnson; Dan Haluptzok |
| 1994 | Canada | **Rick Folk**; Pat Ryan; Bert Gretzinger; Gerry Richard; Ron Steinhauer | Sweden | **Jan-Olov Nässén**; Anders Lööf; Mikael Ljungberg; Leif Sätter; Örjan Jonsson | Germany | **Andy Kapp**; Uli Kapp; Oliver Axnick; Holger Höhne; Michael Schäffer |
| 1994 | Canada | **Rick Folk**; Pat Ryan; Bert Gretzinger; Gerry Richard; Ron Steinhauer | Sweden | **Jan-Olov Nässén**; Anders Lööf; Mikael Ljungberg; Leif Sätter; Örjan Jonsson | Switzerland | **Markus Eggler**; Dominic Andres; Stefan Hofer; Björn Schröder; Martin Zürrer |
| 1995 | Canada | **Kerry Burtnyk**; Jeff Ryan; Rob Meakin; Keith Fenton; Denis Fillion | Scotland | **Gordon Muirhead**; Peter Loudon; Robert Kelly; Russell Keiller; Graeme Connal | Germany | **Andy Kapp**; Uli Kapp; Oliver Axnick; Holger Höhne; Michael Schäffer |
| 1996 | Canada | **Jeff Stoughton**; Ken Tresoor; Garry Van Den Berghe; Steve Gould; Darryl Gunnlaugson | Scotland | **Warwick Smith**; David Smith; Peter Smith; David Hay; Richard Dickson | Switzerland | **Patrick Hürlimann**; Patrik Lörtscher; Daniel Gutknecht; Diego Perren; Stephan Keiser |
| 1997 | Sweden | **Peja Lindholm**; Tomas Nordin; Magnus Swartling; Peter Narup; Marcus Feldt | Germany | **Andy Kapp**; Oliver Axnick; Holger Höhne; Michael Schäffer; Keith Wendorf | Scotland | **Hammy McMillan**; Norman Brown; Mike Hay; Brian Binnie; Peter Loudon |
| 1998 | Canada | **Wayne Middaugh**; Graeme McCarrel; Ian Tetley; Scott Bailey; David Carruthers | Sweden | **Peja Lindholm**; Tomas Nordin; Magnus Swartling; Peter Narup; Marcus Feldt | Finland | **Markku Uusipaavalniemi**; Wille Mäkelä; Tommi Häti; Jari Laukkanen; Jussi Uusipaavalniemi |
| 1999 | Scotland | **Hammy McMillan**; Warwick Smith; Ewan MacDonald; Peter Loudon; Gordon Muirhead | Canada | **Jeff Stoughton**; Jon Mead; Garry Van Den Berghe; Doug Armstrong; Steve Gould | Switzerland | **Patrick Hürlimann**; Dominic Andres; Martin Romang; Diego Perren; Patrik Lörtscher |
| 2000 | Canada | **Greg McAulay**; Brent Pierce; Bryan Miki; Jody Sveistrup; Darin Fenton | Sweden | **Peja Lindholm**; Tomas Nordin; Magnus Swartling; Peter Narup; Marcus Feldt | Finland | **Markku Uusipaavalniemi**; Wille Mäkelä; Tommi Häti; Jari Laukkanen; Perttu Piilo |
| 2001 | Sweden | **Peja Lindholm**; Tomas Nordin; Magnus Swartling; Peter Narup; Anders Kraupp | Switzerland | **Andreas Schwaller**; Markus Eggler; Damian Grichting; Marco Ramstein; Christof Schwaller | Norway | **Pål Trulsen**; Lars Vågberg; Flemming Davanger; Bent Ånund Ramsfjell; Tore Torvbråten |
| 2002 | Canada | David Nedohin; **Randy Ferbey**; Scott Pfeifer; Marcel Rocque; Dan Holowaychuk | Norway | **Pål Trulsen**; Lars Vågberg; Flemming Davanger; Bent Ånund Ramsfjell; Niels Siggaard Andersen | Scotland | **Warwick Smith**; Norman Brown; Ewan MacDonald; Peter Loudon; Tom Brewster, Jr. |
| 2003 | Canada | David Nedohin; **Randy Ferbey**; Scott Pfeifer; Marcel Rocque; Dan Holowaychuk | Switzerland | **Ralph Stöckli**; Claudio Pescia; Pascal Sieber; Simon Strübin; Marco Battilana | Norway | **Pål Trulsen**; Lars Vågberg; Flemming Davanger; Bent Ånund Ramsfjell; Niels Siggaard Andersen |
| 2004 | Sweden | **Peja Lindholm**; Tomas Nordin; Magnus Swartling; Peter Narup; Anders Kraupp | Germany | **Sebastian Stock**; Daniel Herberg; Stephan Knoll; Patrick Hoffman; Markus Messenzehl | Canada | **Mark Dacey**; Bruce Lohnes; Rob Harris; Andrew Gibson; Mathew Harris |
| 2005 | Canada | David Nedohin; **Randy Ferbey**; Scott Pfeifer; Marcel Rocque; Dan Holowaychuk | Scotland | **David Murdoch**; Craig Wilson; Neil Murdoch; Euan Byers; Ewan MacDonald | Germany | **Andy Kapp**; Uli Kapp; Oliver Axnick; Holger Höhne; Andreas Kempf |
| 2006 | Scotland | **David Murdoch**; Ewan MacDonald; Warwick Smith; Euan Byers; Peter Smith | Canada | **Jean-Michel Ménard**; François Roberge; Éric Sylvain; Maxime Elmaleh; Jean Gagnon | Norway | **Thomas Ulsrud**; Torger Nergård; Thomas Due; Jan Thoresen; Christoffer Svae |
| 2007 | Canada | **Glenn Howard**; Richard Hart; Brent Laing; Craig Savill; Steve Bice | Germany | **Andy Kapp**; Uli Kapp; Andreas Lang; Andreas Kempf; Holger Höhne | United States | **Todd Birr**; Bill Todhunter; Greg Johnson; Kevin Birr; Zach Jacobson |
| 2008 | Canada | **Kevin Martin**; John Morris; Marc Kennedy; Ben Hebert; Adam Enright | Scotland | **David Murdoch**; Graeme Connal; Peter Smith; Euan Byers; Peter Loudon | Norway | **Thomas Ulsrud**; Torger Nergård; Christoffer Svae; Håvard Vad Petersson; Thomas Due |
| 2009 | Scotland | **David Murdoch**; Ewan MacDonald; Peter Smith; Euan Byers; Graeme Connal | Canada | **Kevin Martin**; John Morris; Marc Kennedy; Ben Hebert; Terry Meek | Norway | **Thomas Ulsrud**; Torger Nergård; Christoffer Svae; Håvard Vad Petersson; Thomas Løvold |
| 2010 | Canada | **Kevin Koe**; Blake MacDonald; Carter Rycroft; Nolan Thiessen; Jamie King | Norway | **Torger Nergård**; Thomas Løvold; Christoffer Svae; Håvard Vad Petersson | Scotland | Warwick Smith; **David Smith**; Craig Wilson; Ross Hepburn; David Murdoch |
| 2011 | Canada | **Jeff Stoughton**; Jon Mead; Reid Carruthers; Steve Gould; Garth Smith | Scotland | **Tom Brewster**; Greg Drummond; Scott Andrews; Michael Goodfellow; Duncan Fernie | Sweden | **Niklas Edin**; Sebastian Kraupp; Fredrik Lindberg; Viktor Kjäll; Oskar Eriksson |
| 2012 | Canada | **Glenn Howard**; Wayne Middaugh; Brent Laing; Craig Savill; Scott Howard | Scotland | **Tom Brewster**; Greg Drummond; Scott Andrews; Michael Goodfellow; David Edwards | Sweden | **Sebastian Kraupp**; Fredrik Lindberg; Oskar Eriksson; Viktor Kjäll; Niklas Edin |
| 2013 | Sweden | **Niklas Edin**; Sebastian Kraupp; Fredrik Lindberg; Viktor Kjäll; Oskar Eriksson | Canada | **Brad Jacobs**; Ryan Fry; E. J. Harnden; Ryan Harnden; Matt Dumontelle | Scotland | **David Murdoch**; Tom Brewster; Greg Drummond; Scott Andrews; Michael Goodfellow |
| 2014 | Norway | **Thomas Ulsrud**; Torger Nergård; Christoffer Svae; Håvard Vad Petersson; Markus Høiberg | Sweden | **Oskar Eriksson**; Kristian Lindström; Markus Eriksson; Christoffer Sundgren; Gustav Eskilsson | Switzerland | Benoît Schwarz; **Peter de Cruz**; Dominik Märki; Valentin Tanner; Claudio Pätz |
| 2015 | Sweden | **Niklas Edin**; Oskar Eriksson; Kristian Lindström; Christoffer Sundgren; Henrik Leek | Norway | **Thomas Ulsrud**; Torger Nergård; Christoffer Svae; Håvard Vad Petersson; Markus Høiberg | Canada | **Pat Simmons**; John Morris; Carter Rycroft; Nolan Thiessen; Tom Sallows |
| 2016 | Canada | **Kevin Koe**; Marc Kennedy; Brent Laing; Ben Hebert; Scott Pfeifer | Denmark | **Rasmus Stjerne**; Johnny Frederiksen; Mikkel Poulsen; Troels Harry; Oliver Dupont | United States | **John Shuster**; Tyler George; Matt Hamilton; John Landsteiner; Kroy Nernberger |
| 2017 | Canada | **Brad Gushue**; Mark Nichols; Brett Gallant; Geoff Walker; Tom Sallows | Sweden | **Niklas Edin**; Oskar Eriksson; Rasmus Wranå; Christoffer Sundgren; Henrik Leek | Switzerland | Benoît Schwarz; Claudio Pätz; **Peter de Cruz**; Valentin Tanner; Romano Meier |
| 2018 | Sweden | **Niklas Edin**; Oskar Eriksson; Rasmus Wranå; Christoffer Sundgren; Henrik Leek | Canada | **Brad Gushue**; Mark Nichols; Brett Gallant; Geoff Walker; Tom Sallows | Scotland | **Bruce Mouat**; Grant Hardie; Bobby Lammie; Hammy McMillan Jr. Ross Paterson |
| 2019 | Sweden | **Niklas Edin**; Oskar Eriksson; Rasmus Wranå; Christoffer Sundgren; Daniel Magnusson | Canada | **Kevin Koe**; B. J. Neufeld; Colton Flasch; Ben Hebert; Ted Appelman | Switzerland | Benoît Schwarz; Sven Michel; **Peter de Cruz**; Valentin Tanner; Claudio Pätz |
| 2020 | Cancelled | | | | | |
| 2021 | Sweden | **Niklas Edin**; Oskar Eriksson; Rasmus Wranå; Christoffer Sundgren; Daniel Magnusson | Scotland | **Bruce Mouat**; Grant Hardie; Bobby Lammie; Hammy McMillan Jr. Ross Whyte | Switzerland | Benoît Schwarz; Sven Michel; **Peter de Cruz**; Valentin Tanner; Pablo Lachat |
| 2022 | Sweden | **Niklas Edin**; Oskar Eriksson; Rasmus Wranå; Christoffer Sundgren; Daniel Magnusson | Canada | **Brad Gushue**; Mark Nichols; Brett Gallant; Geoff Walker; E. J. Harnden | Italy | **Joël Retornaz**; Amos Mosaner; Sebastiano Arman; Simone Gonin; Mattia Giovanella |
| 2023 | Scotland | **Bruce Mouat**; Grant Hardie; Bobby Lammie; Hammy McMillan Jr. Kyle Waddell | Canada | **Brad Gushue**; Mark Nichols; E. J. Harnden; Geoff Walker; Ryan Harnden | Switzerland | Benoît Schwarz; **Yannick Schwaller**; Sven Michel; Pablo Lachat |
| 2024 | Sweden | **Niklas Edin**; Oskar Eriksson; Rasmus Wranå; Christoffer Sundgren; Daniel Magnusson | Canada | **Brad Gushue**; Mark Nichols; E. J. Harnden; Geoff Walker; Kyle Doering | Italy | **Joël Retornaz**; Amos Mosaner; Sebastiano Arman; Mattia Giovanella; Francesco De Zanna |
| 2025 | Scotland | **Bruce Mouat**; Grant Hardie; Bobby Lammie; Hammy McMillan Jr. Kyle Waddell | Switzerland | Benoît Schwarz-van Berkel; **Yannick Schwaller**; Sven Michel; Pablo Lachat-Couchepin; Kim Schwaller | Canada | **Brad Jacobs**; Marc Kennedy; Brett Gallant; Ben Hebert; Tyler Tardi |
| 2026 | Sweden | **Niklas Edin**; Oskar Eriksson; Rasmus Wranå; Christoffer Sundgren; Simon Olofsson | Canada | **Matt Dunstone**; Colton Lott; E. J. Harnden; Ryan Harnden; Geoff Walker | Scotland | **Ross Whyte**; Robin Brydone; Craig Waddell; Euan Kyle; Duncan McFadzean |
| 2027 | | | | | | |

== All-time medal table ==
As of 2026 World Men's Curling Championship

| Rank | Nation | Gold | Silver | Bronze | Total |
|---|---|---|---|---|---|
| 1 | Canada | 36 | 15 | 8 | 59 |
| 2 | Sweden | 13 | 8 | 7 | 28 |
| 3 | Scotland | 7 | 21 | 10 | 38 |
| 4 | United States | 4 | 5 | 13 | 22 |
| 5 | Norway | 4 | 5 | 9 | 18 |
| 6 | Switzerland | 3 | 7 | 12 | 22 |
| 7 | Germany | 0 | 5 | 5 | 10 |
| 8 | Denmark | 0 | 1 | 2 | 3 |
| 9 | Finland | 0 | 0 | 2 | 2 |
| 9 | Italy | 0 | 0 | 2 | 2 |
| 11 | France | 0 | 0 | 1 | 1 |
| Totals (11 entries) | | **67** | **67** | **71** | **205** |

== Performance timeline ==
| Country | 1950s | 1960s | | | | | | | | | | 1970s | | | | | | | | | | 1980s | | | | | | | | | | 1990s | | | | | | | | | | 2000s | | | | | | | | | | 2010s | | | | | | | | | | 2020s | | | | | | | Years |
| Country | 59 | 60 | 61 | 62 | 63 | 64 | 65 | 66 | 67 | 68 | 69 | 70 | 71 | 72 | 73 | 74 | 75 | 76 | 77 | 78 | 79 | 80 | 81 | 82 | 83 | 84 | 85 | 86 | 87 | 88 | 89 | 90 | 91 | 92 | 93 | 94 | 95 | 96 | 97 | 98 | 99 | 00 | 01 | 02 | 03 | 04 | 05 | 06 | 07 | 08 | 09 | 10 | 11 | 12 | 13 | 14 | 15 | 16 | 17 | 18 | 19 | 21 | 22 | 23 | 24 | 25 | 26 | 27 | Years |
|---|---|---|---|---|---|---|---|---|---|---|---|---|---|---|---|---|---|---|---|---|---|---|---|---|---|---|---|---|---|---|---|---|---|---|---|---|---|---|---|---|---|---|---|---|---|---|---|---|---|---|---|---|---|---|---|---|---|---|---|---|---|---|---|---|---|---|---|---|---|
| Australia | | | | | | | | | | | | | | | | | | | | | | | | | | | | | | | | | | 6 | 6 | 10 | 8 | 10 | 7 | 9 | | | | | | | 10 | 9 | 10 | 6 | | | | | | | | | | | | | | | | | | Q | 12 |
| Austria | | | | | | | | | | | | | | | | | | | | | | | | | 9 | 10 | | | | | | | | | | | | | | | | | | 10 | | | | | | | | | | | | | | | | | | | | | | 12 | | Q | 5 |
| Canada | 1st place, gold medalist(s) | 1st place, gold medalist(s) | 1st place, gold medalist(s) | 1st place, gold medalist(s) | 1st place, gold medalist(s) | 1st place, gold medalist(s) | 2nd place, silver medalist(s) | 1st place, gold medalist(s) | 4 | 1st place, gold medalist(s) | 1st place, gold medalist(s) | 1st place, gold medalist(s) | 1st place, gold medalist(s) | 1st place, gold medalist(s) | 2nd place, silver medalist(s) | 4 | 3rd place, bronze medalist(s) | 9 | 2nd place, silver medalist(s) | 3rd place, bronze medalist(s) | 3rd place, bronze medalist(s) | 1st place, gold medalist(s) | 3rd place, bronze medalist(s) | 1st place, gold medalist(s) | 1st place, gold medalist(s) | 4 | 1st place, gold medalist(s) | 1st place, gold medalist(s) | 1st place, gold medalist(s) | 2nd place, silver medalist(s) | 1st place, gold medalist(s) | 1st place, gold medalist(s) | 2nd place, silver medalist(s) | 3rd place, bronze medalist(s) | 1st place, gold medalist(s) | 1st place, gold medalist(s) | 1st place, gold medalist(s) | 1st place, gold medalist(s) | 4 | 1st place, gold medalist(s) | 2nd place, silver medalist(s) | 1st place, gold medalist(s) | 4 | 1st place, gold medalist(s) | 1st place, gold medalist(s) | 3rd place, bronze medalist(s) | 1st place, gold medalist(s) | 2nd place, silver medalist(s) | 1st place, gold medalist(s) | 1st place, gold medalist(s) | 2nd place, silver medalist(s) | 1st place, gold medalist(s) | 1st place, gold medalist(s) | 1st place, gold medalist(s) | 2nd place, silver medalist(s) | 4 | 3rd place, bronze medalist(s) | 1st place, gold medalist(s) | 1st place, gold medalist(s) | 2nd place, silver medalist(s) | 2nd place, silver medalist(s) | 5 | 2nd place, silver medalist(s) | 2nd place, silver medalist(s) | 2nd place, silver medalist(s) | 3rd place, bronze medalist(s) | 2nd place, silver medalist(s) | Q | 68 |
| China | | | | | | | | | | | | | | | | | | | | | | | | | | | | | | | | | | | | | | | | | | | | | | | | | | 4 | 9 | 11 | 9 | 6 | 6 | 6 | 8 | | 5 | 12 | 11 | 14 | | | | 4 | 7 | Q | 15 |
| Czech Republic | | | | | | | | | | | | | | | | | | | | | | | | | | | | | | | | | | | | | | | | | | | | | | | | | | 12 | 11 | | 8 | 12 | 8 | 7 | 9 | | | | | | 9 | 10 | 9 | 7 | 11 | Q | 13 |
| Denmark | | | | | | | | | | | | | | | 10 | 5 | 9 | 10 | 10 | 10 | 10 | 9 | 8 | 8 | 7 | 9 | 3rd place, bronze medalist(s) | 8 | 4 | 8 | 6 | 3rd place, bronze medalist(s) | 8 | | 5 | 7 | | | 5 | 7 | 6 | 5 | 10 | 5 | 6 | 8 | 11 | 8 | 11 | 9 | 7 | 5 | 12 | 7 | 4 | 12 | | 2nd place, silver medalist(s) | | | | 11 | 13 | | | | | Q | 43 |
| England | | | | | | | | | | | | | | | | | | | | | | | | | | | 10 | | 10 | | | | | 8 | | | 9 | 6 | | | | | | | | | | | | | | | | | | | | | | | | | | | | | | | 5 |
| Finland | | | | | | | | | | | | | | | | | | | | | | | | | | | | | | 9 | | 8 | 10 | 5 | | | | | 10 | 3rd place, bronze medalist(s) | 8 | 3rd place, bronze medalist(s) | 5 | 5 | 4 | | 5 | 5 | 6 | | 12 | | | | 12 | | 4 | 8 | | | | | 11 | | | | | | 19 |
| France | | | | | | | | 7 | 6 | 5 | 7 | 6 | 6 | 7 | 3rd place, bronze medalist(s) | 5 | 5 | 7 | 9 | 7 | 9 | 10 | 10 | 10 | | | | 7 | 9 | 7 | 9 | | 9 | 10 | 10 | | | | | | | 9 | 6 | | | 10 | | | 7 | 5 | 8 | 9 | 5 | 10 | | | | | | | | | | | | | | | 32 |
| Germany | | | | | | | | | 7 | 8 | 6 | 6 | 6 | 3rd place, bronze medalist(s) | 8 | 5 | 7 | 8 | 8 | 6 | 4 | 6 | 9 | 3rd place, bronze medalist(s) | 2nd place, silver medalist(s) | 5 | 9 | 9 | 2nd place, silver medalist(s) | 6 | 8 | 10 | 7 | 9 | 9 | 3rd place, bronze medalist(s) | 3rd place, bronze medalist(s) | 9 | 2nd place, silver medalist(s) | 10 | 7 | | 6 | | 9 | 2nd place, silver medalist(s) | 3rd place, bronze medalist(s) | 10 | 2nd place, silver medalist(s) | 8 | 6 | 7 | 6 | 11 | | 8 | | 12 | 10 | 13 | 8 | 10 | 7 | 9 | 5 | 8 | 9 | Q | 55 |
| Ireland | | | | | | | | | | | | | | | | | | | | | | | | | | | | | | | | | | | | | | | | | | | | | | | | 12 | | | | | | | | | | | | | | | | | | | | | 1 |
| Italy | | | | | | | | | | | | | | | 9 | 10 | 10 | 5 | 7 | 7 | 8 | 7 | 7 | 6 | 10 | 8 | 7 | 10 | | | 7 | 9 | | | | | | 8 | | | | | | | | | 12 | | | | | 10 | | | | | 10 | | 9 | 8 | 7 | 7 | 3rd place, bronze medalist(s) | 4 | 3rd place, bronze medalist(s) | 10 | 5 | Q | 30 |
| Japan | | | | | | | | | | | | | | | | | | | | | | | | | | | | | | | | | | | | | | | | | | 10 | | 9 | | | | 11 | | | 10 | 12 | | | 11 | 5 | 6 | 4 | 7 | 11 | 4 | 9 | | 7 | 11 | 9 | 8 | Q | 18 |
| Netherlands | | | | | | | | | | | | | | | | | | | | | | | | | | | | | | | | | | | | 7 | | | | | | | | | | | | | | | | | | | | | | | 11 | 10 | 10 | 12 | 12 | | 8 | | | Q | 8 |
| New Zealand | | | | | | | | | | | | | | | | | | | | | | | | | | | | | | | | | | | | | | | | | 10 | | 9 | | | 7 | 8 | | | | | | | 5 | | | | | | | | | | 13 | 13 | | | | 7 |
| Norway | | | | | | 5 | 6 | 5 | 5 | 5 | 8 | 5 | 6 | 6 | 7 | 9 | 8 | 6 | 6 | 2nd place, silver medalist(s) | 1st place, gold medalist(s) | 2nd place, silver medalist(s) | 4 | 5 | 3rd place, bronze medalist(s) | 1st place, gold medalist(s) | 6 | 6 | 3rd place, bronze medalist(s) | 1st place, gold medalist(s) | 3rd place, bronze medalist(s) | 5 | 3rd place, bronze medalist(s) | | 6 | 6 | 5 | 4 | 7 | 5 | 5 | 7 | 3rd place, bronze medalist(s) | 2nd place, silver medalist(s) | 3rd place, bronze medalist(s) | 4 | 4 | 3rd place, bronze medalist(s) | 8 | 3rd place, bronze medalist(s) | 3rd place, bronze medalist(s) | 2nd place, silver medalist(s) | 4 | 4 | 5 | 1st place, gold medalist(s) | 2nd place, silver medalist(s) | 5 | 8 | 5 | 12 | 8 | 10 | 5 | 10 | 6 | 13 | Q | 62 |
| Philippines | | | | | | | | | | | | | | | | | | | | | | | | | | | | | | | | | | | | | | | | | | | | | | | | | | | | | | | | | | | | | | | | | | | | Q | 1 |
| Poland | | | | | | | | | | | | | | | | | | | | | | | | | | | | | | | | | | | | | | | | | | | | | | | | | | | | | | | | | | | | | | | | | | | 12 | Q | 2 |
| Russia | | | | | | | | | | | | | | | | | | | | | | | | | | | | | | | | | | | | | | | | | | | | | | | | | | | | | | | 10 | 11 | 12 | 10 | 12 | 9 | 9 | 4 | | | | | | | 8 |
| Scotland | 2nd place, silver medalist(s) | 2nd place, silver medalist(s) | 2nd place, silver medalist(s) | 3rd place, bronze medalist(s) | 2nd place, silver medalist(s) | 2nd place, silver medalist(s) | 4 | 2nd place, silver medalist(s) | 1st place, gold medalist(s) | 2nd place, silver medalist(s) | 3rd place, bronze medalist(s) | 2nd place, silver medalist(s) | 2nd place, silver medalist(s) | 4 | 4 | 8 | 6 | 2nd place, silver medalist(s) | 3rd place, bronze medalist(s) | 5 | 6 | 8 | 6 | 7 | 5 | 7 | 5 | 2nd place, silver medalist(s) | 8 | 3rd place, bronze medalist(s) | 5 | 2nd place, silver medalist(s) | 1st place, gold medalist(s) | 2nd place, silver medalist(s) | 2nd place, silver medalist(s) | 7 | 2nd place, silver medalist(s) | 2nd place, silver medalist(s) | 3rd place, bronze medalist(s) | 4 | 1st place, gold medalist(s) | 8 | | 3rd place, bronze medalist(s) | 7 | 5 | 2nd place, silver medalist(s) | 1st place, gold medalist(s) | 9 | 2nd place, silver medalist(s) | 1st place, gold medalist(s) | 3rd place, bronze medalist(s) | 2nd place, silver medalist(s) | 2nd place, silver medalist(s) | 3rd place, bronze medalist(s) | 9 | 11 | 7 | 6 | 3rd place, bronze medalist(s) | 6 | 2nd place, silver medalist(s) | 5 | 1st place, gold medalist(s) | 4 | 1st place, gold medalist(s) | 3rd place, bronze medalist(s) | Q | 67 |
| South Korea | | | | | | | | | | | | | | | | | | | | | | | | | | | | | | | | | | | | | | | | | | | | | 10 | | | | 12 | | | | 11 | | | | | 11 | | 4 | 13 | 13 | 8 | 12 | 12 | 13 | 10 | Q | 13 |
| Sweden | | | | 4 | 4 | 4 | 3rd place, bronze medalist(s) | 4 | 2nd place, silver medalist(s) | 4 | 4 | 3rd place, bronze medalist(s) | 5 | 8 | 1st place, gold medalist(s) | 2nd place, silver medalist(s) | 4 | 4 | 1st place, gold medalist(s) | 4 | 7 | 4 | 5 | 4 | 4 | 3rd place, bronze medalist(s) | 2nd place, silver medalist(s) | 4 | 6 | 5 | 3rd place, bronze medalist(s) | 3rd place, bronze medalist(s) | 6 | 7 | 6 | 2nd place, silver medalist(s) | 7 | 5 | 1st place, gold medalist(s) | 2nd place, silver medalist(s) | 9 | 2nd place, silver medalist(s) | 1st place, gold medalist(s) | 8 | 5 | 1st place, gold medalist(s) | 9 | 5 | 5 | 10 | | 8 | 3rd place, bronze medalist(s) | 3rd place, bronze medalist(s) | 1st place, gold medalist(s) | 2nd place, silver medalist(s) | 1st place, gold medalist(s) | 6 | 2nd place, silver medalist(s) | 1st place, gold medalist(s) | 1st place, gold medalist(s) | 1st place, gold medalist(s) | 1st place, gold medalist(s) | 5 | 1st place, gold medalist(s) | 5 | 1st place, gold medalist(s) | Q | 64 |
| Switzerland | | | | | | 6 | 5 | 6 | 8 | 5 | 5 | 6 | 4 | 5 | 5 | 3rd place, bronze medalist(s) | 1st place, gold medalist(s) | 3rd place, bronze medalist(s) | 5 | 7 | 2nd place, silver medalist(s) | 3rd place, bronze medalist(s) | 1st place, gold medalist(s) | 2nd place, silver medalist(s) | 8 | 2nd place, silver medalist(s) | 8 | 5 | 7 | 4 | 2nd place, silver medalist(s) | 6 | 5 | 1st place, gold medalist(s) | 3rd place, bronze medalist(s) | 3rd place, bronze medalist(s) | 6 | 3rd place, bronze medalist(s) | 7 | 8 | 3rd place, bronze medalist(s) | 6 | 2nd place, silver medalist(s) | 5 | 2nd place, silver medalist(s) | 6 | 7 | 5 | 4 | 11 | 4 | 6 | 7 | 9 | 7 | 3rd place, bronze medalist(s) | 7 | 9 | 3rd place, bronze medalist(s) | 7 | 3rd place, bronze medalist(s) | 3rd place, bronze medalist(s) | 6 | 3rd place, bronze medalist(s) | 7 | 2nd place, silver medalist(s) | 5 | Q | 63 |
| Turkey | | | | | | | | | | | | | | | | | | | | | | | | | | | | | | | | | | | | | | | | | | | | | | | | | | | | | | | | | | | | | | | | 11 | | | | | 1 |
| United States | | | 3rd place, bronze medalist(s) | 2nd place, silver medalist(s) | 3rd place, bronze medalist(s) | 3rd place, bronze medalist(s) | 1st place, gold medalist(s) | 3rd place, bronze medalist(s) | 3rd place, bronze medalist(s) | 3rd place, bronze medalist(s) | 2nd place, silver medalist(s) | 4 | 3rd place, bronze medalist(s) | 2nd place, silver medalist(s) | 6 | 1st place, gold medalist(s) | 2nd place, silver medalist(s) | 1st place, gold medalist(s) | 4 | 1st place, gold medalist(s) | 5 | 5 | 2nd place, silver medalist(s) | 9 | 6 | 6 | 4 | 3rd place, bronze medalist(s) | 5 | 10 | 10 | 7 | 3rd place, bronze medalist(s) | 3rd place, bronze medalist(s) | 3rd place, bronze medalist(s) | 5 | 4 | 7 | 6 | 6 | 4 | 4 | 6 | 4 | 8 | 9 | 6 | 4 | 3rd place, bronze medalist(s) | 7 | 5 | 4 | 10 | 8 | 9 | 10 | 5 | 3rd place, bronze medalist(s) | 4 | 6 | 5 | 5 | 4 | 8 | 6 | 11 | 4 | Q | 66 |
| Wales | | | | | | | | | | | | | | | | | | | | | | | | | | | | | | | | | | | | | 10 | | | | | | | | | | | | | | | | | | | | | | | | | | | | | | | | 1 |

== Multiple gold medalists ==
As of 2026 World Men's Curling Championship

Include curler with at least 4 gold medals.

| No. | Curler | Country | Period (Note: Period from the first to the last medals won.) | Gold medal – first place | Silver medal – second place | Bronze medal – third place | Total |
|---|---|---|---|---|---|---|---|
| 1 | Oskar Eriksson | Sweden | 2011–2026 | 8 | 2 | 2 | 12 |
| 1 | Niklas Edin | Sweden | 2011–2026 | 8 | 1 | 2 | 11 |
| 3 | Christoffer Sundgren | Sweden | 2014–2026 | 7 | 2 | – | 9 |
| 4 | Rasmus Wranå | Sweden | 2017–2026 | 6 | 1 | – | 7 |
| 5 | Randy Ferbey | Canada | 1988–2005 | 4 | 1 | – | 5 |
| 5 | Ernie Richardson | Canada | 1959–1963 | 4 | – | – | 4 |
| 5 | Arnold Richardson | Canada | 1959–1963 | 4 | – | – | 4 |
| 5 | Sam Richardson | Canada | 1959–1963 | 4 | – | – | 4 |
| 5 | Glenn Howard | Canada | 1987–2012 | 4 | – | – | 4 |
| 5 | Scott Pfeifer | Canada | 2002–2016 | 4 | – | – | 4 |
| 5 | Daniel Magnusson | Sweden | 2019–2024 | 4 | – | – | 4 |

== Multiple finalists ==
As of 2026 World Men's Curling Championship

Include curler with at least 5 final appearances.

| No. | Curler | Country | Period | Gold medal – first place | Silver medal – second place | Final | Bronze medal – third place | Total |
|---|---|---|---|---|---|---|---|---|
| 1 | Oskar Eriksson | Sweden | 2011–2026 | 8 | 2 | 10 | 2 | 12 |
| 2 | Niklas Edin | Sweden | 2011–2026 | 8 | 1 | 9 | 2 | 11 |
| 2 | Christoffer Sundgren | Sweden | 2014–2026 | 7 | 2 | 9 | – | 9 |
| 4 | Peter Smith | Scotland | 1986–2009 | 3 | 5 | 8 | 1 | 9 |
| 5 | Rasmus Wranå | Sweden | 2017–2026 | 6 | 1 | 7 | – | 7 |
| 6 | Geoff Walker | Canada | 2017–2026 | 1 | 5 | 6 | – | 6 |
| 7 | Randy Ferbey | Canada | 1988–2005 | 4 | 1 | 5 | – | 5 |
| 7 | Eigil Ramsfjell | Norway | 1978–1991 | 3 | 2 | 5 | 4 | 9 |
| 7 | Peja Lindholm | Sweden | 1997–2004 | 3 | 2 | 5 | – | 5 |
| 7 | Tomas Nordin | Sweden | 1997–2004 | 3 | 2 | 5 | – | 5 |
| 7 | Magnus Swartling | Sweden | 1997–2004 | 3 | 2 | 5 | – | 5 |
| 7 | Peter Narup | Sweden | 1997–2004 | 3 | 2 | 5 | – | 5 |
| 7 | Graeme Connal | Scotland | 1991–2009 | 2 | 3 | 5 | – | 5 |
| 7 | David Smith | Scotland | 1986–2010 | 1 | 4 | 5 | 2 | 7 |
| 7 | Brad Gushue | Canada | 2017–2024 | 1 | 4 | 5 | – | 5 |
| 7 | Mark Nichols | Canada | 2017–2024 | 1 | 4 | 5 | – | 5 |
| 7 | E. J. Harnden | Canada | 2013–2026 | – | 5 | 5 | – | 5 |

== Multiple medallists ==
As of 2026 World Men's Curling Championship

Include curler with at least 6 medals of any colour.

| No. | Curler | Country | Period | Gold medal – first place | Silver medal – second place | Bronze medal – third place | Total |
|---|---|---|---|---|---|---|---|
| 1 | Oskar Eriksson | Sweden | 2011–2026 | 8 | 2 | 2 | 12 |
| 2 | Niklas Edin | Sweden | 2011–2026 | 8 | 1 | 2 | 11 |
| 3 | Christoffer Sundgren | Sweden | 2014–2026 | 7 | 2 | – | 9 |
| 3 | Peter Smith | Scotland | 1986–2009 | 3 | 5 | 1 | 9 |
| 3 | Eigil Ramsfjell | Norway | 1978–1991 | 3 | 2 | 4 | 9 |
| 6 | Rasmus Wranå | Sweden | 2017–2026 | 6 | 1 | – | 7 |
| 6 | David Smith | Scotland | 1986–2010 | 1 | 4 | 2 | 7 |
| 8 | David Murdoch | Scotland | 2005–2013 | 2 | 2 | 2 | 6 |
| 8 | Sjur Loen | Norway | 1983–1991 | 2 | – | 4 | 6 |
| 8 | Geoff Walker | Canada | 2017–2026 | 1 | 5 | – | 6 |
| 8 | Patrik Lörtscher | Switzerland | 1980–1999 | 1 | 2 | 3 | 6 |
| 8 | Torger Nergård | Norway | 2006–2015 | 1 | 2 | 3 | 6 |
| 8 | Christoffer Svae | Norway | 2006–2015 | 1 | 2 | 3 | 6 |
| 8 | Benoît Schwarz-van Berkel | Switzerland | 2014–2025 | – | 1 | 5 | 6 |

== Records ==
Most championship titles
| Curler | Country | No. | Years |
|---|---|---|---|
| Niklas Edin | Sweden | 8 | 2013, 2015, 2018–2019, 2021–2022, 2024, 2026 |
| Oskar Eriksson | Sweden | 8 | 2013, 2015, 2018–2019, 2021–2022, 2024, 2026 |

Most championship finals
| Curler | Country | No. | Years |
|---|---|---|---|
| Oskar Eriksson | Sweden | 10 | 2013–2015, 2017–2019, 2021–2022, 2024, 2026 |

Most championship medals
| Curler | Country | No. | Years |
|---|---|---|---|
| Oskar Eriksson | Sweden | 12 | 2011–2015, 2017–2019, 2021–2022, 2024, 2026 |

Most championship appearances
| Curler | Country | No. | Years |
|---|---|---|---|
| Eigil Ramsfjell | Norway | 15 | 1976–1981, 1983–1984, 1987–1991, 1995–1996 |
| Niklas Edin | Sweden | 15 | 2006, 2011–2013, 2015–2019, 2021–2026 |
| Oskar Eriksson | Sweden | 15 | 2011–2019, 2021–2026 |

Most titles at back-to-back events
| Curler | Country | No. | Period |
|---|---|---|---|
| Niklas Edin | Sweden | 4 | 2018–2022 |
| Oskar Eriksson | Sweden | 4 | 2018–2022 |
| Rasmus Wranå | Sweden | 4 | 2018–2022 |
| Christoffer Sundgren | Sweden | 4 | 2018–2022 |

Most finals at back-to-back events
| Curler | Country | No. | Period |
|---|---|---|---|
| Niklas Edin | Sweden | 5 | 2017–2022 |
| Oskar Eriksson | Sweden | 5 | 2017–2022 |
| Rasmus Wranå | Sweden | 5 | 2017–2022 |
| Christoffer Sundgren | Sweden | 5 | 2017–2022 |

Most medals at back-to-back events
| Curler | Country | No. | Period |
|---|---|---|---|
| Oskar Eriksson | Sweden | 5 | 2011–2015, 2017–2022 |
| Niklas Edin | Sweden | 5 | 2017–2022 |
| Rasmus Wranå | Sweden | 5 | 2017–2022 |
| Christoffer Sundgren | Sweden | 5 | 2017–2022 |

Most appearances at back-to-back events
| Curler | Country | No. | Period |
|---|---|---|---|
| Oskar Eriksson | Sweden | 15 | 2011–2026 |

Teams went undefeated in championship
| Year | Country | Skip | Games played |
|---|---|---|---|
| 1959 | Canada | Ernie Richardson | 5 |
| 1960 | Canada | Ernie Richardson | 5 |
| 1962 | Canada | Ernie Richardson | 6 |
| 1964 | Canada | Lyall Dagg | 7 |
| 1966 | Canada | Ron Northcott | 8 |
| 1970 | Canada | Don Duguid | 8 |
| 1971 | Canada | Don Duguid | 9 |
| 1972 | Canada | Orest Meleschuk | 9 |
| 1980 | Canada | Rick Folk | 10 |
| 1995 | Canada | Kerry Burtnyk | 11 |
| 2017 | Canada | Brad Gushue | 13 |

== See also ==
- List of World Women's Curling Champions
- World Mixed Doubles Curling Championship
- List of Olympic medalists in curling
- List of Paralympic medalists in wheelchair curling
- List of European Curling Champions
- Pan Continental Curling Championships
- List of World Junior Curling Champions
- Collie Campbell Memorial Award
- World Qualification Event

== Notes ==
- Bronze medals were only awarded from 1986. Table shows third-place finishers before then.
- 1989–94: Two bronze medals were awarded.
