= Morten Skaug =

Norwegian male curler and coach

- Curler ♂
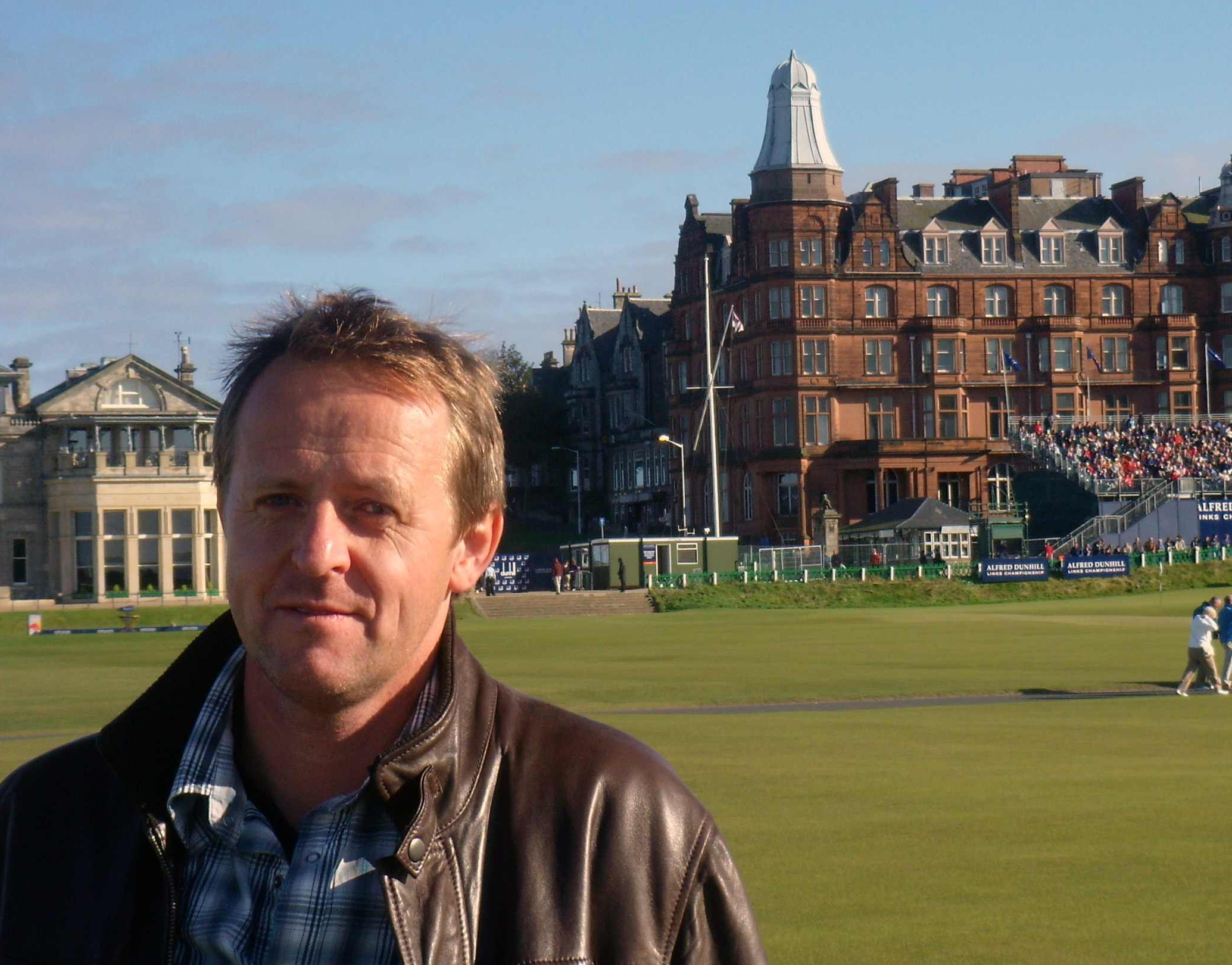

Team
- Curling club: Brumunddal CC, Oslo, Snarøyen CC, Oslo

Curling career
- Member Association: Norway
- World Championship: 5 (1982, 1985, 1989, 1990, 1991)
- European Championship: 4 (1983, 1984, 1985, 1990)
- Other appearances: World Junior Championships: 3 (1979, 1982, 1984)
Medal record
Curling
World Championships
Bronze medal – third place	1989 Milwaukee
Bronze medal – third place	1991 Winnipeg
European Championships
Silver medal – second place	1983 Västerås
Bronze medal – third place	1984 Morzine
Bronze medal – third place	1985 Grindelwald
Bronze medal – third place	1990 Lillehammer

Morten Skaug is a Norwegian curler and curling coach.

He is a 1989 and 1991 World men's bronze medallist.

== Teams ==
Season	Skip	Third	Second	Lead	Alternate	Coach	Events
1978–79	Sjur Loen	Morten Skaug	Olav Saugstad	Tom Sørlundsengen			WJCC 1979 (4th)
1981–82	Morten Skaug	Tom Sørlundsengen	Helge Smeby	Yngve Slyngstad		Bo Bakke	WJCC 1982 (6th)
1981–82	Sjur Loen	Morten Søgård	Morten Skaug	Dagfinn Loen		Kristian Sørum	WCC 1982 (5th)
1983–84	Kristian Sørum	Morten Søgård	Dagfinn Loen	Morten Skaug			ECC 1983 (silver)
1983–84	Morten Skaug	Olav Saugstad	Tom Sørlundsengen	Helge Smeby			WJCC 1984 (5th)
1984–85	Kristian Sørum	Morten Søgård	Dagfinn Loen	Morten Skaug			ECC 1984 (bronze)
1984–85	Kristian Sørum	Morten Søgård	Morten Skaug	Dagfinn Loen		Bo Bakke	WCC 1985 (6th)
1985–86	Eigil Ramsfjell	Sjur Loen	Gunnar Meland	Morten Skaug			ECC 1985 (bronze)
1988–89	Eigil Ramsfjell	Sjur Loen	Morten Søgaard	Bo Bakke	Morten Skaug		WCC 1989 (bronze)
1989–90	Eigil Ramsfjell	Sjur Loen	Niclas Järund	Morten Skaug	Flemming Davanger		WCC 1990 (5th)
1990–91	Eigil Ramsfjell	Sjur Loen	Morten Skaug	Niclas Järund			ECC 1990 (bronze)
1990–91	Eigil Ramsfjell	Sjur Loen	Niclas Järund	Morten Skaug	Dagfinn Loen		WCC 1991 (bronze)

== Record as a coach of national teams ==
Year	Tournament, event	National team	Place
2005	2005 World Junior Curling Championships	Norway (junior men)	5
