= Stephan Keiser =

Swiss curler and coach (born 1958)

- Curler ♂
- Born: 4 November 1958 (age 68)

Team
- Curling club: Lausanne-Olympique CC, Lausanne

Curling career
- Member Association: Switzerland
- World Championship: 1 (1996)
Medal record
Curling
World Championships
Bronze medal – third place	1996 Hamilton
Swiss Men's Championship
Gold medal – first place	1996 Arlesheim

Stephan Keiser (born 4 November 1958) is a Swiss curler and curling coach.

He is a 1996 World Men's bronze medallist and a Swiss men's champion (1996).

He was a coach of Swiss men's team at the 1998 Winter Olympics where they were the first Olympic champions in men's curling.

== Teams ==
Season	Skip	Third	Second	Lead	Alternate	Events
1995–96	Patrick Hürlimann	Patrik Lörtscher	Daniel Gutknecht	Diego Perren	Stephan Keiser	SMCC 1996 (gold); WCC 1996 (bronze)

== Record as a coach of national teams ==
Year	Tournament, event	National team	Place
1996	1998 Winter Olympics	Switzerland (men)	1st place, gold medalist(s)
1997	1997 European Curling Championships	Switzerland (men)	5
1999	1999 World Men's Curling Championship	Switzerland (men)	3rd place, bronze medalist(s)
1999	1999 European Curling Championships	Switzerland (men)	4
2000	2000 World Men's Curling Championship	Switzerland (men)	6
2002	2002 World Men's Curling Championship	Switzerland (men)	5
2019	2019 World Junior Curling Championships	Switzerland (junior women)	3rd place, bronze medalist(s)
