= Marcus Feldt =

Swedish male curler

- Curler ♂
- Other names: Mackan
- Born: 17 September 1970 (age 56); Uppsala

Team
- Curling club: Svegs CK, Sveg

Curling career
- Member Association: Sweden
- World Championship: 3 (1997, 1998, 2000)
- European Championship: 1 (1997)
- Olympic: 1 (1998)
Medal record
Curling
World Championships
Gold medal – first place	1997 Bern
Silver medal – second place	1998 Kamloops
Silver medal – second place	2000 Glasgow

Marcus "Mackan" Feldt (born 17 September 1970, in Uppsala) is a Swedish curler.

He is a 1997 World men's champion and a two-time World men's silver medallist (1998, 2000).

He participated at the 1998 Winter Olympic games where Swedish men's team finished in sixth place.

== Teams ==
Season	Skip	Third	Second	Lead	Alternate	Coach	Events
1996–97	Marcus Feldt	Sven Olsson	Morgan Eriksson	Ronney Goransson			
1996–97	Peja Lindholm	Tomas Nordin	Magnus Swartling	Peter Narup	Marcus Feldt		WCC 1997 (gold)
1997–98	Peja Lindholm	Tomas Nordin	Magnus Swartling	Peter Narup	Marcus Feldt	Thomas Norgren	ECC 1997 (4th); WOG 1998 (6th); WCC 1998 (silver)
1999–00	Peja Lindholm	Tomas Nordin	Magnus Swartling	Peter Narup	Marcus Feldt	Mats (II) Nyberg	WCC 2000 (silver)
2003–04	Marcus Feldt	Sven Olsson	Stefan Goransson	Eric Carlsén			
2005–06	Sven Olsson	Marcus Feldt	Ronney Goransson	Tobias Goransson			
2012–13	Sven Olsson	Marcus Feldt	Urban Backman	Erik Westling	Thomas Feldt		
