= 1990 World Junior Curling Championships =

- Host city: Portage la Prairie, Manitoba, Canada
- Dates: March 18–24
- Men's winner: Switzerland (1st title)
- Skip: Stefan Traub
- Third: Andreas Östreich
- Second: Markus Widmer
- Lead: Roland Müggler
- Finalist: Scotland (Graeme Connal)
- Women's winner: Scotland (1st title)
- Skip: Kirsty Addison
- Third: Karen Addison
- Second: Joanna Pegg
- Lead: Laura Scott
- Finalist: Sweden (Cathrine Norberg)

The 1990 World Junior Curling Championships were held from March 18 to 24 in Portage la Prairie, Manitoba, Canada.

It was the first World Junior Championships to include teams from Finland.

== Men ==
=== Teams ===
Country	Skip	Third	Second	Lead	Alternate
Canada	Dean Joanisse	David Nantes	Tim Coombes	Jeff Pilon	
Finland	Tomi Rantamäki (4th)	Pasi Länsiluoto (skip)	Jussi Heinonsalo	Eero Kupila	
France	Jan Henri Ducroz	Spencer Mugnier	Sylvain Ducroz	Thomas Dufour	
West Germany	Björn Schröder	Mathias Zobel	Markus Herberg	Felix Ogger	Harold Waldvogel
Italy	Stefano Ferronato	Gianluca Lorenzi	Marco Alberti	Alessandro Lettieri	
Norway	Anthon Grimsmo	Jan Thoresen	Christian Skaug	Hans Olav Sørholt	
Scotland	Graeme Connal	Iain Watt	Richard Hartley	Ian Baxter	
Sweden	Peter Lindholm	Magnus Swartling	Magnus Burman	Peter Narup	Tomas Nordin
Switzerland	Stefan Traub	Andreas Östreich	Markus Widmer	Roland Müggler	
United States	Kurt Marquardt	Jeff Falk	Dan Thurston	Mike Thurston	

=== Round Robin ===
Key
Teams to Playoffs
Teams to Tiebreaker for 4th place
Teams to Tiebreaker for 8th place

Place	Country	1	2	3	4	5	6	7	8	9	10	Wins	Losses
1	Sweden	*	3:1	4:5	5:1	4:3	7:4	5:4	5:3	8:4	9:2	8	1
2	Canada	1:3	*	7:5	8:0	9:1	6:8	5:4	6:4	7:1	7:2	7	2
3	Scotland	5:4	5:7	*	4:3	5:6	4:3	1:8	4:3	5:2	9:7	6	3
4	Switzerland	1:5	0:8	3:4	*	9:3	6:5	4:5	9:4	7:6	8:2	5	4
4	West Germany	3:4	1:9	6:5	3:9	*	3:9	3:2	8:1	6:5	7:5	5	4
4	Norway	4:7	8:6	3:4	5:6	9:3	*	8:2	5:3	5:6	7:4	5	4
7	United States	4:5	4:5	8:1	5:4	2:3	2:8	*	5:2	5:7	7:9	4	5
8	Italy	3:5	4:6	3:4	4:9	1:8	3:5	2:5	*	7:3	7:4	2	7
8	France	4:8	1:7	2:5	6:7	5:6	6:5	7:5	3:7	*	9:7	2	7
10	Finland	2:9	2:7	7:9	2:8	5:7	4:7	9:7	4:7	7:9	*	1	8

==== Tiebreakers ====
For 4th place:

Round 1
West Germany	7
Norway	6

Round 2
Switzerland	6
West Germany	5

For 8th place:

.
Italy	9
France	3

=== Playoffs ===
Semifinals
1	Sweden	5
4	Switzerland	7
2	Canada	3
3	Scotland	4

Gold Medal Game
4	Switzerland	5
3	Scotland	4
Bronze Medal Game
1	Sweden	11
2	Canada	1

=== Rankings ===
Place	Country	Games	Wins	Losses
1st place, gold medalist(s)	Switzerland	12	8	4
2nd place, silver medalist(s)	Scotland	11	7	4
3rd place, bronze medalist(s)	Sweden	11	9	2
4	Canada	11	7	4
5	West Germany	11	6	5
6	Norway	10	5	5
7	United States	9	4	5
8	Italy	10	3	7
9	France	10	2	8
10	Finland	9	1	8

== Women ==
=== Teams ===
Country	Skip	Third	Second	Lead	Alternate
Canada	Cathy Overton	Tracy Baldwin	Carol Harvey	Tracy Bush	
Denmark	June Simonsen	Dorthe Holm	Dorthe Andersen	Angelina Jensen	
France	Karine Caux (4th)	Laurence Bibollet (skip)	Chrystelle Fournier	Véronique Girod	Géraldine Girod
West Germany	Karoline Schlachter (4th)	Monica Imminger (skip)	Elisabeth Ländle	Alexandra Theurer	Ulanou Klotz
Italy	Daniela Zandegiacomo	Carla Zandegiacomo	Giulia Lacedelli	Rossela Carrara	
Norway	Cathrine Ulrichsen	Cecilie Torhaug	Darcie Skjerpen	Anna Moe	
Scotland	Kirsty Addison	Karen Addison	Joanna Pegg	Laura Scott	
Sweden	Cathrine Norberg	Mari Högqvist	Helene Granqvist	Annica Eklund	Eva Eriksson
Switzerland	Helga Oswald	Sara Ochsner	Janine Oswald	Tatjana Stadler	Nicole Strausak
United States	Kari Liapis	Stacey Liapis	Heidi Rollheiser	Roberta Breyen	Julie Breyen

=== Round Robin ===
Key
Teams to Playoffs

Place	Country	1	2	3	4	5	6	7	8	9	10	Wins	Losses
1	Scotland	*	10:3	5:7	8:7	6:1	8:3	8:5	7:5	9:2	9:2	8	1
2	Canada	3:10	*	6:5	6:4	10:3	12:1	6:1	6:3	11:1	11:5	8	1
3	Sweden	7:5	5:6	*	10:3	7:4	13:1	7:8	6:5	7:1	8:0	7	2
4	Switzerland	7:8	4:6	3:10	*	6:3	6:4	8:1	9:2	11:3	10:7	6	3
5	Norway	1:6	3:10	4:7	3:6	*	5:3	11:6	6:3	7:3	10:9	5	4
6	United States	3:8	1:12	1:13	4:6	3:5	*	4:2	8:4	8:5	9:2	4	5
7	France	5:8	1:6	8:7	1:8	6:11	2:4	*	6:4	7:2	9:7	4	5
8	Denmark	5:7	3:6	5:6	2:9	3:6	4:8	4:6	*	9:2	9:6	2	7
9	Italy	2:9	1:11	1:7	3:11	3:7	5:8	2:7	2:9	*	9:7	1	8
10	West Germany	2:9	5:11	0:8	7:10	9:10	2:9	7:9	6:9	7:9	*	0	9

=== Playoffs ===
Semifinals
1	Scotland	5
4	Switzerland	2
2	Canada	7
3	Sweden	8

Gold Medal Game
1	Scotland	5
2	Sweden	3
Bronze Medal Game
2	Canada	8
4	Switzerland	1

=== Rankings ===
Place	Country	Games	Wins	Losses
1st place, gold medalist(s)	Scotland	11	10	1
2nd place, silver medalist(s)	Sweden	11	8	3
3rd place, bronze medalist(s)	Canada	11	9	2
4	Switzerland	11	6	5
5	Norway	9	5	4
6	United States	9	4	5
7	France	9	4	5
8	Denmark	9	2	7
9	Italy	9	1	8
10	West Germany	9	0	9

== Awards ==
WJCC All-Star Team:

	Skip	Third	Second	Lead
Men	(Sweden) Peter Lindholm	(Canada) David Nantes	(Scotland) Richard Hartley	(Sweden) Peter Narup
Women	(Canada) Cathy Overton	(Switzerland) Sara Ochsner	(Scotland) Joanna Pegg	(Canada) Tracy Bush

WJCC Sportsmanship Award:

Men	(Sweden) Peter Lindholm
Women	(Norway) Cecilie Torhaug

== Sources ==
- Men's results from the World Curling Federation
- Women's results from the World Curling Federation
