= Curling at the 1998 Winter Olympics =

Curling at the XVIII Olympic Winter Games
- Venue: Kazakoshi Park Arena
- Dates: 9–15 February 1998
- Competitors: 80 from 10 nations

Men's curling at the XVIII Olympic Winter Games

Medalists
1st place, gold medalist(s)		Switzerland
2nd place, silver medalist(s)		Canada
3rd place, bronze medalist(s)		Norway

Women's curling at the XVIII Olympic Winter Games

Medalists
1st place, gold medalist(s)		Canada
2nd place, silver medalist(s)		Denmark
3rd place, bronze medalist(s)		Sweden

Curling at the 1998 Winter Olympics took place at Karuizawa, who had hosted the equestrian events at the 1964 Summer Olympics in Tokyo. The 1998 Nagano Olympics marked the first time that curling was held as an official Olympic sport. It was the first time the same city hosted events for both the Summer and Winter Olympics.

== Medal summary ==
=== Medal table ===
Rank	Nation	Gold	Silver	Bronze	Total
1	Canada	1	1	0	2
2	Switzerland	1	0	0	1
3	Denmark	0	1	0	1
4	Norway	0	0	1	1
4	Sweden	0	0	1	1
Totals (5 entries)		2	2	2	6

=== Events ===
Event	Gold	Silver	Bronze
Men's	Switzerland; Patrick Hürlimann; Patrik Lörtscher; Daniel Müller; Diego Perren; Dominic Andres	Canada; Mike Harris; Richard Hart; George Karrys; Collin Mitchell; Paul Savage	Norway; Eigil Ramsfjell; Jan Thoresen; Stig-Arne Gunnestad; Anthon Grimsmo; Tore Torvbråten
Women's	Canada; Sandra Schmirler; Jan Betker; Joan McCusker; Marcia Gudereit; Atina Ford	Denmark; Helena Blach Lavrsen; Margit Pörtner; Dorthe Holm; Trine Qvist; Jane Bidstrup	Sweden; Elisabet Gustafson; Katarina Nyberg; Louise Marmont; Elisabeth Persson; Margaretha Lindahl

== Men's ==
=== Teams ===
Canada	Germany	Great Britain	Japan
Skip: Mike Harris; Third: Richard Hart; Second: Collin Mitchell; Lead: George Karrys; Alternate: Paul Savage	CC Füssen Skip: Andy Kapp; Third: Uli Kapp; Second: Michael Schäffer; Lead: Holger Höhne; Alternate: Oliver Axnick	Skip: Douglas Dryburgh Third: Peter Wilson; Second: Phil Wilson; Lead: Ronnie Napier; Alternate: James Dryburgh	Skip: Makoto Tsuruga; Third: Hiroshi Sato; Second: Yoshiyuki Ohmiya; Lead: Hirofumi Kudo; Alternate: Hisaaki Nakamine
Norway	Sweden	Switzerland	United States
Snaøren CC, Oslo Skip: Eigil Ramsfjell; Third: Jan Thoresen; Second: Stig-Arne Gunnestad; Lead: Anthon Grimsmo; Alternate: Tore Torvbråten	Östersunds CK Skip: Peja Lindholm; Third: Tomas Nordin; Second: Magnus Swartling; Lead: Peter Narup; Alternate: Marcus Feldt	Lausanne-Olympique CC Skip: Patrick Hürlimann; Third: Patrik Lörtscher; Second: Daniel Müller; Lead: Diego Perren; Alternate: Dominic Andres	Skip: Tim Somerville; Third: Mike Peplinski; Second: Myles Brundidge; Lead: John Gordon; Alternate: Tim Solin

=== Round-robin standings ===
Nation	Skip	W	L	Qualification
Canada	Mike Harris	6	1	Playoffs
Norway	Eigil Ramsfjell	5	2	Playoffs
Switzerland	Patrick Hürlimann	5	2	Playoffs
Japan	Makoto Tsuruga	3	4	Tiebreaker
Sweden	Peja Lindholm	3	4	Tiebreaker
United States	Tim Somerville	3	4	Tiebreaker
Great Britain	Douglas Dryburgh	2	5	
Germany	Andy Kapp	1	6	

=== Results ===
All times shown are in Japan Standard Time

==== Draw 1 ====
9 February, 14:00

Sheet A	1	2	3	4	5	6	7	8	9	10	Final
Germany (Kapp) 🔨	0	0	1	0	2	0	0	1	0	0	4
Switzerland (Hürlimann)	0	1	0	1	0	1	0	0	1	3	7

Sheet B	1	2	3	4	5	6	7	8	9	10	Final
Norway (Ramsfjell) 🔨	0	0	0	0	0	1	0	0	1	X	2
Great Britain (Dryburgh)	0	1	1	0	1	0	0	1	0	X	4

Sheet C	1	2	3	4	5	6	7	8	9	10	Final
Canada (Harris) 🔨	2	0	1	0	1	0	0	2	1	X	7
Japan (Tsuruga)	0	1	0	1	0	1	1	0	0	X	4

Sheet D	1	2	3	4	5	6	7	8	9	10	Final
United States (Somerville) 🔨	1	0	0	0	0	0	0	1	0	0	2
Sweden (Lindholm)	0	0	0	0	0	1	0	0	2	3	6

==== Draw 2 ====
10 February, 9:00

Sheet A	1	2	3	4	5	6	7	8	9	10	11	Final
Japan (Tsuruga) 🔨	0	1	0	1	1	0	1	1	0	0	1	6
Sweden (Lindholm)	0	0	1	0	0	1	0	0	3	0	0	5

Sheet B	1	2	3	4	5	6	7	8	9	10	Final
Canada (Harris) 🔨	3	0	2	0	1	5	X	X	X	X	11
United States (Somerville)	0	1	0	2	0	0	X	X	X	X	3

Sheet C	1	2	3	4	5	6	7	8	9	10	Final
Switzerland (Hürlimann)	0	3	0	3	0	2	0	2	X	X	10
Great Britain (Dryburgh) 🔨	1	0	1	0	1	0	1	0	X	X	4

Sheet D	1	2	3	4	5	6	7	8	9	10	Final
Germany (Kapp) 🔨	1	0	1	0	0	0	2	1	0	X	5
Norway (Ramsfjell)	0	2	0	2	2	0	0	0	1	X	7

==== Draw 3 ====
10 February, 19:00

Sheet A	1	2	3	4	5	6	7	8	9	10	Final
Canada (Harris) 🔨	2	0	2	0	1	0	2	3	X	X	10
Great Britain (Dryburgh)	0	1	0	1	0	1	0	0	X	X	3

Sheet B	1	2	3	4	5	6	7	8	9	10	Final
Germany (Kapp)	0	1	0	1	0	1	1	0	2	0	6
Sweden (Lindholm) 🔨	1	0	1	0	3	0	0	1	0	1	7

Sheet C	1	2	3	4	5	6	7	8	9	10	Final
United States (Somerville) 🔨	0	1	1	0	0	2	0	2	0	1	7
Norway (Ramsfjell)	0	0	0	1	1	0	3	0	1	0	6

Sheet D	1	2	3	4	5	6	7	8	9	10	Final
Switzerland (Hürlimann) 🔨	2	0	1	0	0	0	2	0	0	X	5
Japan (Tsuruga)	0	0	0	0	2	0	0	0	1	X	3

==== Draw 4 ====
11 February, 14:00

Sheet A	1	2	3	4	5	6	7	8	9	10	Final
Norway (Ramsfjell) 🔨	0	1	0	0	0	1	1	1	0	1	5
Japan (Tsuruga)	1	0	0	1	0	0	0	0	1	0	3

Sheet B	1	2	3	4	5	6	7	8	9	10	Final
United States (Somerville) 🔨	0	0	0	0	0	2	0	0	X	X	2
Switzerland (Hürlimann)	0	0	1	0	2	0	1	3	X	X	7

Sheet C	1	2	3	4	5	6	7	8	9	10	Final
Germany (Kapp)	0	0	2	1	0	0	2	1	0	X	6
Canada (Harris) 🔨	2	2	0	0	2	2	0	0	2	X	10

Sheet D	1	2	3	4	5	6	7	8	9	10	Final
Sweden (Lindholm) 🔨	2	0	0	1	0	3	0	1	0	0	7
Great Britain (Dryburgh)	0	0	1	0	3	0	1	0	0	0	5

==== Draw 5 ====
12 February, 9:00

Sheet A	1	2	3	4	5	6	7	8	9	10	Final
United States (Somerville) 🔨	2	0	2	0	1	1	0	0	2	X	8
Germany (Kapp)	0	1	0	2	0	0	1	1	0	X	5

Sheet B	1	2	3	4	5	6	7	8	9	10	Final
Great Britain (Dryburgh)	1	0	3	0	2	1	2	0	0	X	9
Japan (Tsuruga) 🔨	0	2	0	2	0	0	0	0	1	X	5

Sheet C	1	2	3	4	5	6	7	8	9	10	Final
Norway (Ramsfjell) 🔨	1	1	1	0	0	1	1	1	0	1	7
Sweden (Lindholm)	0	0	0	2	0	0	0	0	2	0	4

Sheet D	1	2	3	4	5	6	7	8	9	10	Final
Canada (Harris)	1	0	3	1	0	0	0	1	2	X	8
Switzerland (Hürlimann) 🔨	0	1	0	0	1	0	0	0	0	X	3

==== Draw 6 ====
12 February, 19:00

Sheet A	1	2	3	4	5	6	7	8	9	10	Final
Switzerland (Hürlimann) 🔨	0	0	0	1	0	2	0	0	1	0	4
Norway (Ramsfjell)	0	1	0	0	1	0	1	1	0	1	5

Sheet B	1	2	3	4	5	6	7	8	9	10	Final
Sweden (Lindholm)	1	0	0	0	1	0	0	0	1	X	3
Canada (Harris) 🔨	0	2	2	0	0	0	1	1	0	X	6

Sheet C	1	2	3	4	5	6	7	8	9	10	Final
Great Britain (Dryburgh)	0	0	0	0	0	2	0	0	2	0	4
Germany (Kapp) 🔨	1	0	1	1	2	0	0	1	0	1	7

Sheet D	1	2	3	4	5	6	7	8	9	10	Final
Japan (Tsuruga) 🔨	0	1	0	2	0	1	0	4	0	X	8
United States (Somerville)	0	0	1	0	2	0	2	0	1	X	6

==== Draw 7 ====
13 February, 14:00

Sheet A	1	2	3	4	5	6	7	8	9	10	Final
Great Britain (Dryburgh) 🔨	1	0	1	0	0	0	1	0	0	X	3
United States (Somerville)	0	2	0	0	0	3	0	0	1	X	6

Sheet B	1	2	3	4	5	6	7	8	9	10	Final
Japan (Tsuruga) 🔨	2	0	0	0	1	1	0	1	0	2	7
Germany (Kapp)	0	1	0	1	0	0	1	0	2	0	5

Sheet C	1	2	3	4	5	6	7	8	9	10	Final
Sweden (Lindholm)	0	1	0	0	1	0	0	0	X	X	2
Switzerland (Hürlimann) 🔨	2	0	0	1	0	1	3	1	X	X	8

Sheet D	1	2	3	4	5	6	7	8	9	10	Final
Norway (Thoresen) 🔨	0	2	0	0	3	0	4	0	0	1	10
Canada (Harris)	2	0	2	0	0	1	0	2	1	0	8

=== Tie-breaker 1 ===
13 February, 19:00

Sheet B	1	2	3	4	5	6	7	8	9	10	Final
United States (Somerville) 🔨	0	0	0	3	0	0	1	1	0	X	5
Sweden (Lindholm)	0	0	1	0	0	0	0	0	1	X	2

=== Tie-breaker 2 ===
14 February, 9:00

Sheet C	1	2	3	4	5	6	7	8	9	10	Final
United States (Somerville)	0	0	1	0	0	3	0	0	0	1	5
Japan (Tsuruga) 🔨	1	0	0	0	1	0	0	2	0	0	4

=== Medal round ===
Semi-final
1	Canada	7
4	United States	1
2	Norway	7
3	Switzerland	8

Final
1	Canada	3
3	Switzerland	9
Bronze medal
4	United States	4
2	Norway	9

=== Semi-finals ===
14 February, 18:00

Sheet A	1	2	3	4	5	6	7	8	9	10	Final
Norway (Ramsfjell) 🔨	0	0	1	0	1	0	2	0	3	0	7
Switzerland (Hürlimann)	1	0	0	2	0	2	0	2	0	1	8

Player Percentages
Norway		Switzerland	
Anthon Grimsmo	88%	Diego Perren	85%
Stig-Arne Gunnestad	75%	Daniel Müller	81%
Jan Thoresen	53%	Patrik Lörtscher	85%
Eigil Ramsfjell	65%	Patrick Hürlimann	79%
Total	70%	Total	82%

Sheet D	1	2	3	4	5	6	7	8	9	10	Final
Canada (Harris) 🔨	2	1	1	0	1	2	0	0	X	X	7
United States (Somerville)	0	0	0	0	0	0	0	1	X	X	1

Player Percentages
Canada		United States	
George Karrys	90%	John Gordon	89%
Collin Mitchell	98%	Myles Brundidge	67%
Richard Hart	98%	Mike Peplinski	55%
Mike Harris	92%	Tim Somerville	66%
Total	94%	Total	69%

=== Bronze medal game ===
15 February, 9:00

Sheet B	1	2	3	4	5	6	7	8	9	10	Final
United States (Somerville) 🔨	0	0	0	0	0	3	0	1	0	X	4
Norway (Ramsfjell)	0	1	1	1	3	0	2	0	1	X	9

Player Percentages
United States		Norway	
John Gordon	86%	Tore Torvbråten	87%
Myles Brundidge	56%	Stig-Arne Gunnestad	81%
Mike Peplinski	60%	Jan Thoresen	81%
Tim Somerville	57%	Eigil Ramsfjell	74%
Total	65%	Total	80%

=== Gold medal game ===
15 February, 17:00

Sheet C	1	2	3	4	5	6	7	8	9	10	Final
Canada (Harris) 🔨	0	0	1	0	0	0	2	0	X	X	3
Switzerland (Hürlimann)	0	2	0	2	2	3	0	0	X	X	9

Player Percentages
Canada		Switzerland	
George Karrys	98%	Diego Perren	89%
Collin Mitchell	73%	Daniel Müller	86%
Richard Hart	58%	Patrik Lörtscher	72%
Mike Harris	25%	Patrick Hürlimann	78%
Total	64%	Total	81%

=== Final standings ===
Rank	Country	Skip	W	L
1st place, gold medalist(s)	Switzerland	Patrick Hürlimann	7	2
2nd place, silver medalist(s)	Canada	Mike Harris	7	2
3rd place, bronze medalist(s)	Norway	Eigil Ramsfjell	6	3
4	United States	Tim Somerville	5	6
5	Japan	Makoto Tsuruga	3	5
6	Sweden	Peja Lindholm	3	5
7	Great Britain	Douglas Dryburgh	2	5
8	Germany	Andy Kapp	1	6

=== Top 5 player percentages ===
Leads	%	Seconds	%	Thirds	%	Skips	%
(Sweden) Peter Narup	82	(Canada) Collin Mitchell	84	(Canada) Richard Hart	83	(Canada) Mike Harris	79
(Canada) George Karrys	81	(Sweden) Magnus Swartling	77	(Switzerland) Patrik Lörtscher	77	(Switzerland) Patrick Hürlimann	75
(Switzerland) Diego Perren	81	(Switzerland) Daniel Müller	77	(Sweden) Tomas Nordin	74	(Japan) Makoto Tsuruga	73
(Germany) Holger Höhne	78	(United Kingdom) Philip Wilson	76	(Norway) Jan Thoresen	73	(Sweden) Peter Lindholm	72
(Norway) Anthon Grimsmo	77	(Germany) Oliver Axnick	76	(United States) Mike Peplinski	71	(Norway) Eigil Ramsfjell	72
						(United States) Tim Somerville	72

== Women's ==
=== Teams ===
Nation	Skip	Third	Second	Lead	Alternate
Canada	Sandra Schmirler	Jan Betker	Joan McCusker	Marcia Gudereit	Atina Ford
Denmark	Helena Blach Lavrsen	Margit Pörtner	Dorthe Holm	Trine Qvist	Jane Bidstrup
Germany	Andrea Schöpp	Monika Wagner	Natalie Nessler	Heike Wieländer	Carina Meidele
Great Britain	Kirsty Hay	Edith Loudon	Jackie Lockhart	Katie Loudon	Felsie Bayne
Japan	Mayumi Ohkutsu	Akiko Katoh	Yukari Kondo	Yoko Mimura	Akemi Niwa
Norway	Dordi Nordby	Marianne Haslum	Kristin Løvseth	Hanne Woods	Grethe Wolan
Sweden	Elisabet Gustafson	Katarina Nyberg	Louise Marmont	Elisabeth Persson	Margaretha Lindahl
United States	Lisa Schoeneberg	Erika Brown	Debbie Henry	Lori Mountford	Stacey Liapis

=== Round-robin standings ===
Nation	Skip	W	L	Qualification
Canada	Sandra Schmirler	6	1	Playoffs
Sweden	Elisabet Gustafson	6	1	Playoffs
Denmark	Helena Blach Lavrsen	5	2	Playoffs
Great Britain	Kirsty Hay	4	3	Playoffs
Japan	Mayumi Ohkutsu	2	5	
Norway	Dordi Nordby	2	5	
United States	Lisa Schoeneberg	2	5	
Germany	Andrea Schöpp	1	6	

=== Results ===
All times shown are in Japan Standard Time

==== Draw 1 ====
9 February, 9:00

Sheet A	1	2	3	4	5	6	7	8	9	10	Final
Norway (Nordby)	0	0	0	1	0	1	0	0	0	X	2
Sweden (Gustafson) 🔨	0	0	2	0	2	0	1	1	2	X	8

Sheet B	1	2	3	4	5	6	7	8	9	10	Final
Canada (Schmirler)	0	2	0	3	2	0	0	0	0	X	7
United States (Schoeneberg) 🔨	1	0	1	0	0	2	1	1	0	X	6

Sheet C	1	2	3	4	5	6	7	8	9	10	Final
Germany (Schöpp) 🔨	2	0	0	1	0	2	0	0	0	0	5
Denmark (Lavrsen)	0	1	0	0	1	0	1	1	1	1	6

Sheet D	1	2	3	4	5	6	7	8	9	10	Final
Japan (Ohkutsu)	0	2	0	1	1	0	0	1	0	X	5
Great Britain (Hay) 🔨	1	0	0	0	0	1	2	0	3	X	7

==== Draw 2 ====
9 February, 19:00

Sheet A	1	2	3	4	5	6	7	8	9	10	Final
Denmark (Lavrsen) 🔨	1	1	1	0	0	2	0	2	2	X	9
Great Britain (Hay)	0	0	0	1	1	0	1	0	0	X	3

Sheet B	1	2	3	4	5	6	7	8	9	10	Final
Germany (Schöpp) 🔨	0	0	1	0	0	1	0	X	X	X	2
Japan (Ohkutsu)	1	3	0	1	1	0	3	X	X	X	9

Sheet C	1	2	3	4	5	6	7	8	9	10	Final
Sweden (Gustafson)	1	0	1	1	0	2	2	0	1	X	8
United States (Schoeneberg) 🔨	0	0	0	0	3	0	0	2	0	X	5

Sheet D	1	2	3	4	5	6	7	8	9	10	11	Final
Norway (Nordby) 🔨	0	0	1	0	1	1	0	2	0	0	1	6
Canada (Schmirler)	0	1	0	1	0	0	2	0	0	1	0	5

==== Draw 3 ====
10 February, 14:00

Sheet A	1	2	3	4	5	6	7	8	9	10	Final
Germany (Schöpp) 🔨	0	0	2	1	0	0	0	2	0	0	5
United States (Schoeneberg)	2	1	0	0	0	1	1	0	2	1	8

Sheet B	1	2	3	4	5	6	7	8	9	10	Final
Norway (Nordby)	1	0	2	0	1	0	0	0	0	0	4
Great Britain (Hay) 🔨	0	1	0	1	0	0	1	1	0	2	6

Sheet C	1	2	3	4	5	6	7	8	9	10	Final
Japan (Ohkutsu) 🔨	1	0	1	0	1	0	0	0	1	X	4
Canada (Schmirler)	0	0	0	2	0	3	1	1	0	X	7

Sheet D	1	2	3	4	5	6	7	8	9	10	11	Final
Sweden (Gustafson) 🔨	0	0	0	1	0	0	0	2	1	0	1	5
Denmark (Lavrsen)	0	0	0	0	0	1	1	0	0	2	0	4

==== Draw 4 ====
11 February, 9:00

Sheet A	1	2	3	4	5	6	7	8	9	10	Final
Canada (Schmirler)	0	0	3	0	4	0	0	0	2	X	9
Denmark (Lavrsen) 🔨	0	1	0	1	0	1	1	1	0	X	5

Sheet B	1	2	3	4	5	6	7	8	9	10	Final
Japan (Ohkutsu) 🔨	2	0	2	0	0	1	0	1	0	X	6
Sweden (Gustafson)	0	1	0	0	3	0	4	0	4	X	12

Sheet C	1	2	3	4	5	6	7	8	9	10	11	Final
Norway (Nordby) 🔨	0	0	0	1	0	1	0	2	1	1	0	6
Germany (Schöpp)	1	0	1	0	1	0	3	0	0	0	1	7

Sheet D	1	2	3	4	5	6	7	8	9	10	Final
Great Britain (Hay) 🔨	0	3	2	0	2	0	0	0	1	X	8
United States (Schoeneberg)	0	0	0	2	0	1	1	1	0	X	5

==== Draw 5 ====
11 February, 19:00

Sheet A	1	2	3	4	5	6	7	8	9	10	Final
Japan (Ohkutsu) 🔨	2	0	0	1	0	0	2	1	2	X	8
Norway (Nordby)	0	1	2	0	1	0	0	0	0	X	4

Sheet B	1	2	3	4	5	6	7	8	9	10	Final
United States (Schoeneberg)	0	0	1	2	0	1	0	1	0	X	5
Denmark (Lavrsen) 🔨	2	3	0	0	1	0	1	0	1	X	8

Sheet C	1	2	3	4	5	6	7	8	9	10	Final
Canada (Schmirler)	0	0	1	0	4	1	0	2	X	X	8
Great Britain (Hay) 🔨	1	0	0	1	0	0	1	0	X	X	3

Sheet D	1	2	3	4	5	6	7	8	9	10	Final
Germany (Schöpp)	0	0	1	0	0	0	1	1	0	X	3
Sweden (Gustafson) 🔨	0	2	0	0	2	2	0	0	2	X	8

==== Draw 6 ====
12 February, 14:00

Sheet A	1	2	3	4	5	6	7	8	9	10	Final
Sweden (Gustafson) 🔨	0	2	0	1	0	0	0	1	1	X	5
Canada (Schmirler)	0	0	3	0	1	1	2	0	0	X	7

Sheet B	1	2	3	4	5	6	7	8	9	10	Final
Great Britain (Hay)	0	1	0	1	0	1	1	0	0	2	6
Germany (Schöpp) 🔨	1	0	0	0	1	0	0	2	1	0	5

Sheet C	1	2	3	4	5	6	7	8	9	10	11	Final
United States (Schoeneberg) 🔨	2	0	0	1	1	0	1	0	2	1	0	8
Norway (Nordby)	0	2	1	0	0	3	0	2	0	0	1	9

Sheet D	1	2	3	4	5	6	7	8	9	10	Final
Denmark (Lavrsen) 🔨	1	0	1	0	0	1	1	0	2	X	6
Japan (Ohkutsu)	0	1	0	1	1	0	0	1	0	X	4

==== Draw 7 ====
13 February, 9:00

Sheet A	1	2	3	4	5	6	7	8	9	10	Final
United States (Schoeneberg) 🔨	1	2	1	0	1	3	0	2	X	X	10
Japan (Ohkutsu)	0	0	0	0	0	0	2	0	X	X	2

Sheet B	1	2	3	4	5	6	7	8	9	10	Final
Denmark (Lavrsen)	2	0	1	0	1	1	2	1	X	X	8
Norway (Nordby) 🔨	0	1	0	2	0	0	0	0	X	X	3

Sheet C	1	2	3	4	5	6	7	8	9	10	Final
Great Britain (Hay) 🔨	0	1	1	0	1	0	2	0	0	X	5
Sweden (Gustafson)	1	0	0	2	0	1	0	0	4	X	8

Sheet D	1	2	3	4	5	6	7	8	9	10	Final
Canada (Schmirler)	0	1	0	1	0	3	0	0	3	X	8
Germany (Schöpp) 🔨	1	0	1	0	2	0	1	0	0	X	5

=== Medal round ===
Semi-final
1	Canada	6
4	Great Britain	5
2	Sweden	5
3	Denmark	7

Final
1	Canada	7
3	Denmark	5
Bronze medal
4	Great Britain	6
2	Sweden	10

=== Semi-finals ===
14 February, 14:00

Sheet B	1	2	3	4	5	6	7	8	9	10	11	Final
Canada (Schmirler)	0	1	0	1	0	1	0	2	0	0	1	6
Great Britain (Hay) 🔨	1	0	1	0	0	0	2	0	0	1	0	5

Player Percentages
Canada		Great Britain	
Marcia Gudereit	82%	Katie Loudon	64%
Joan McCusker	73%	Jackie Lockhart	85%
Jan Betker	74%	Edith Loudon	66%
Sandra Schmirler	85%	Kirsty Hay	76%
Total	78%	Total	73%

Sheet D	1	2	3	4	5	6	7	8	9	10	Final
Denmark (Lavrsen) 🔨	1	0	0	1	2	2	1	0	0	X	7
Sweden (Gustafson)	0	0	2	0	0	0	0	2	1	X	5

Player Percentages
Denmark		Sweden	
Trine Qvist	78%	Elisabeth Persson	86%
Dorthe Holm	73%	Louise Marmont	74%
Margit Pörtner	70%	Katarina Nyberg	60%
Helena Blach Lavrsen	61%	Elisabet Gustafson	64%
Total	70%	Total	71%

=== Bronze medal game ===
15 February, 9:00

Sheet C	1	2	3	4	5	6	7	8	9	10	Final
Sweden (Gustafson) 🔨	2	0	2	0	1	0	4	1	0	X	10
Great Britain (Hay)	0	1	0	2	0	2	0	0	1	X	6

Player Percentages
Sweden		Great Britain	
Elisabeth Persson	86%	Katie Loudon	85%
Louise Marmont	76%	Jackie Lockhart	64%
Katarina Nyberg	85%	Edith Loudon	63%
Elisabet Gustafson	85%	Kirsty Hay	68%
Total	83%	Total	70%

=== Gold medal game ===
15 February, 13:00

Sheet C	1	2	3	4	5	6	7	8	9	10	Final
Denmark (Lavrsen)	0	2	0	0	0	0	2	0	1	X	5
Canada (Schmirler) 🔨	3	0	0	1	1	1	0	1	0	X	7

Player Percentages
Denmark		Canada	
Trine Qvist	80%	Marcia Gudereit	95%
Dorthe Holm	83%	Joan McCusker	89%
Margit Pörtner	65%	Jan Betker	73%
Helena Blach Lavrsen	75%	Sandra Schmirler	72%
Total	76%	Total	84%

=== Final standings ===
Rank	Country	Skip	W	L
1st place, gold medalist(s)	Canada	Sandra Schmirler	8	1
2nd place, silver medalist(s)	Denmark	Helena Blach Lavrsen	6	3
3rd place, bronze medalist(s)	Sweden	Elisabet Gustafson	7	2
4	Great Britain	Kirsty Hay	4	5
5	Japan	Mayumi Ohkutsu	2	5
5	Norway	Dordi Nordby	2	5
5	United States	Lisa Schoeneberg	2	5
8	Germany	Andrea Schöpp	1	6

=== Top 5 player percentages ===
Leads	%	Seconds	%	Thirds	%	Skips	%
(United States) Lori Mountford	79	(Sweden) Louise Marmont	76	(Canada) Jan Betker	78	(Canada) Sandra Schmirler	79
(Canada) Marcia Gudereit	79	(Canada) Joan McCusker	74	(Sweden) Katarina Nyberg	76	(Sweden) Elisabet Gustafson	72
(Sweden) Elisabeth Persson	78	(Denmark) Dorthe Holm	71	(Japan) Akiko Katoh	68	(United Kingdom) Kirsty Hay	71
(United Kingdom) Katie Loudon	74	(United Kingdom) Jackie Lockhart	69	(United States) Erika Brown	67	(Denmark) Helena Blach Lavrsen	70
(Denmark) Trine Qvist	71	(United States) Debbie Henry	68	(United Kingdom) Edith Loudon	66	(United States) Lisa Schoeneberg	69
