= Graeme Connal =

Scottish curler (born 1969)

Medal record

Men's Curling

Representing Scotland

World Championships
Gold medal – first place	1991 Winnipeg	Team
Gold medal – first place	2009 Moncton	Team
Silver medal – second place	1993 Geneva	Team
Silver medal – second place	1995 Brandon	Team
Silver medal – second place	2008 Grand Forks	Team

European Championships
Gold medal – first place	2007 Füssen	Team
Gold medal – first place	2008 Örnsköldsvik	Team
Silver medal – second place	1991 Chamonix	Team
Bronze medal – third place	1992 Perth	Team

World Junior Championships
Silver medal – second place	1990 Portage la Prairie	Team

World Senior Championships
Silver medal – second place	2023 Gangneung	Team

Graeme Connal (born 12 September 1969) is a Scottish curler and world champion. He won a gold medal at the 1991 World Curling Championships in Winnipeg. He received a gold medal at the 2007 European Curling Championships in Füssen. He was skip for the Scottish team that received a silver medal at the 1990 World Junior Curling Championships in Portage la Prairie.

Connal was educated at Craigclowan Preparatory School in Perth, Scotland.

== Teammates ==
2010 Vancouver Olympic Games

- David Murdoch, Skip
- Ewan MacDonald, Third
- Peter Smith, Second
- Euan Byers, Lead
