= Ewan MacDonald =

Scottish curler (born 1975)

- Curler
- Born: 17 November 1975 (age 50); Inverness, Scotland

Team
- Curling club: Citadel CC, Inverness, SCO
- Skip: Ewan MacDonald
- Third: Duncan Fernie
- Second: David Reid
- Lead: Euan Byers

Curling career
- World Championship: 10 (1999, 2002, 2003, 2004, 2005, 2006, 2007, 2009, 2014, 2015)
- European Championship: 6 (1999, 2001, 2005, 2006, 2008, 2009)
- Olympic: 3 (2002, 2006, 2010)
Medal record
Men's Curling
Representing Scotland
World Championships
Gold medal – first place	1999 Saint John
Gold medal – first place	2006 Lowell
Gold medal – first place	2009 Moncton
Silver medal – second place	2005 Victoria
Bronze medal – third place	2002 Bismarck
European Championships
Gold medal – first place	1999 Chamonix
Gold medal – first place	2008 Örnsköldsvik
Silver medal – second place	2006 Basel
Bronze medal – third place	2005 Garmisch-Partenkirchen
European Mixed Championships
Gold medal – first place	2012 Erzurum
Silver medal – second place	2013 Edinburgh

Ewan MacDonald (born 17 November 1975 in Inverness, Scotland) is a Scottish curler. Representing Scotland, he is a three-time World Champion, playing second for Hammy McMillan in 1999 and playing third for David Murdoch in 2006 and 2009. He has also represented Great Britain at three Winter Olympics, in Salt Lake City 2002, Torino 2006 and Vancouver 2010. He was previously married to fellow curler and the 2002 Olympic Gold medallist, Fiona MacDonald. In 2023, he was inducted into the World Curling Federation Hall of Fame.

== Career ==
At his World Championship debut in 1999, MacDonald played second for Hammy McMillan. Their Scottish team would go all the way and win the gold medal defeating Canada in the final, skipped by Jeff Stoughton. Later that year they won the European Curling Championships defeating Denmark in the final skipped by Ulrik Schmidt.

In 2001 the team was back at the European Championships, but they finished in fifth place. In 2002 they represented Great Britain at the 2002 Winter Olympics and finished in seventh place. That year Ewan switched teams to play second for Warwick Smith. They went to the 2002 Ford World Curling Championships and won a bronze medal. The team returned to the 2003 Ford World Curling Championships and finished in seventh place. At the 2004 Ford World Curling Championships, MacDonald skipped Scotland to a fifth-place finish.

At the 2005 Ford World Men's Curling Championship, MacDonald was an alternate for David Murdoch's silver medal-winning team. Later that year, MacDonald moved up to play second and the team won a bronze at the European Championships. By 2006, MacDonald was playing third and the new team finished in fourth place at the 2006 Winter Olympics. They would also go to the 2006 World Men's Curling Championship where they won a gold medal.

Ewan MacDonald would return to the World Championship podium at the 2009 Moncton World Championships where his team won the gold medal. For the round robin portion of the competition MacDonald had the best percentage, 88%, of all Thirds. In the 1 vs. 2 Playoff Match and in the Gold Medal Match he outshot Canadian third John Morris shooting 89% and 88% respectively.

== Teammates ==
- 2010 Vancouver Olympic Games
  - David Murdoch, Skip
  - Peter Smith, Second
  - Euan Byers, Lead
  - Graeme Connal, Alternate
- 2006 Torino Olympic Games
  - David Murdoch, Skip
  - Warwick Smith, Second
  - Euan Byers, Lead
  - Craig Wilson, Alternate
- 2002 Salt Lake City Olympic Games
  - Hammy McMillan, Skip
  - Warwick Smith, Third
  - Peter Loudon, Lead
  - Norman Brown, Alternate
