= Morten Søgård =

Norwegian curler

Morten Søgård (born 3 December 1956, in Brumunddal) won the Men's World Curling Championships (Lausanne, Switzerland) and the Winter Olympic Games Curling (Calgary, Canada) competitions in 1988. Eigil Ramsfjell, skip, Sjur Loen, Bo Bakke and Gunnar Meland (alt.) played on the team in both competitions.

He is currently working as a Sales and Marketing Director for ErgoGroup.
