= Ursuliak =

Ursuliak (Russian: Урсуляк) is a surname. Notable people with the surname include:

- Alexandra Ursuliak (born 1983), Russian actress
- Sergei Ursuliak (born 1958), Russian film director and screenwriter
- Wally Ursuliak (1929–2025), Canadian curler

== See also ==
- Murray Ursulak (also: Murray Ursuliak), Canadian curler
