= Margit Pörtner =

Danish curler

Personal information
- Nationality: Danish
- Born: February 16, 1972 Hørsholm, Denmark
- Died: April 26, 2017 (aged 45) Denmark

Sport
- Sport: Curling

Margit Pörtner
Medal record

Representing Denmark

Women's Curling

Olympic Games
Silver medal – second place	1998 Nagano	Team

World championships
Silver medal – second place	1998 Kamloops	Team
Bronze medal – third place	1997 Berne	Team

European Curling Championships
Gold medal – first place	1994 Sundsvall	Team

Margit Pörtner (16 February 1972 – 26 April 2017) was a Danish curler and Olympic medalist. She received a silver medal at the 1998 Winter Olympics in Nagano. This was the first medal, Denmark has ever won at a Winter Olympics, and the only one until 2026, when Viktor Hald Thorup won silver medals at the 2026 Olympics. She received two medals at the World Curling Championships, and is European champion from 1994.
