= Grethe Wolan =

Norwegian curler

Personal information
- Nationality: Norwegian
- Born: 15 October 1968 (age 57) Trondheim, Norway

Sport
- Sport: Curling
- Club: Snarøen CC

Grethe Wolan (born 15 October 1968) is a Norwegian curler, born in Trondheim. She competed in curling at the 1998 Winter Olympics.
