= Warwick Smith (curler) =

Scottish curler (born 1971)

- Curler
- Born: 11 June 1971 (age 55); Perth, Scotland

Team
- Skip: Warwick Smith
- Third: David Smith
- Second: Sandy Reid
- Lead: Ross Hepburn

Curling career
- World Championship: 9 (1996, 1998, 1999, 2002, 2003, 2004, 2006, 2007, 2010)
Medal record
Men's curling
Representing Scotland
World Championships
Gold medal – first place	1999 Saint John
Gold medal – first place	2006 Lowell
Silver medal – second place	1996 Hamilton
Bronze medal – third place	2002 Bismarck
Bronze medal – third place	2010 Cortina d'Ampezzo
European Championships
Gold medal – first place	1999 Chamonix
Bronze medal – third place	2005 Garmisch-Partenkirchen

Warwick B. Smith (born 11 June 1971) is a Scottish curler from Bridge of Earn, Perth and Kinross.

== Career ==
Smith made his international debut at the 1996 World Curling Championships as the skip for the Scotland team. His debut was fairly successful, as the team would win the silver medal, losing to Canada's Jeff Stoughton in the final.

At the 1998 Championships, Warwick would play third for David Smith and the team finished in 4th place. The following year, Warwick played third for Hammy McMillan and won gold, this time beating Jeff Stoughton's team in the final.

Smith was a member of the Great Britain 2002 Winter Olympics curling team. He played third for McMillan, but the team finished at a disappointing 7th place. At that year's World Championship, Warwick skipped the Scotland team to a bronze medal. The following year, he skipped a team to a 7th-place finish. In 2004, he played third for Ewan MacDonald and finished 5th.

At the 2006 Winter Olympics, Smith played second for David Murdoch and finished 4th, but Smith had the highest accuracy of any curler in the men's competition round robin. The team then went on to win the World Championship.

On the next season, Smith built a new team with Ross Hepburn as lead, David Smith (no relation) as second, and Craig Wilson as third. After winning the Scottish Championship, they represented Scotland at the 2007 World Championship, with Ewan MacDonald being the alternate player. The team did not fare well there, compiling a 4–7 record and finishing 9th.
