= 1989 World Men's Curling Championship =

- Host city: Milwaukee, Wisconsin
- Arena: Milwaukee Auditorium
- Dates: April 3–9, 1989
- Winner: Canada
- Curling club: Ottewell CC, Edmonton, Alberta
- Skip: Pat Ryan
- Third: Randy Ferbey
- Second: Don Walchuk
- Lead: Don McKenzie
- Alternate: Murray Ursulak
- Finalist: Switzerland (Patrick Hürlimann)

The 1989 World Men's Curling Championship was held at the Milwaukee Auditorium in Milwaukee, Wisconsin from April 3–9, 1989.

== Teams ==
Canada	Denmark	France	Germany
Ottewell CC, Edmonton, Alberta Skip: Pat Ryan; Third: Randy Ferbey; Second: Don Walchuk; Lead: Don McKenzie; Alternate: Murray Ursulak	Hvidovre CC, Hvidovre Skip: Tommy Stjerne; Third: Per Berg; Second: Peter Andersen; Lead: Anders Søderblom; Alternate: Ivan Frederiksen	Megève CC, Megève Skip: Dominique Dupont-Roc; Third: Christian Dupont-Roc; Second: Daniel Cosetto; Lead: Patrick Philippe; Alternate: Thierry Mercier	EV Füssen, Füssen Skip: Roland Jentsch; Third: Uli Sutor; Second: Charlie Kapp; Lead: Thomas Vogelsang; Alternate: Andy Kapp
Italy	Norway	Scotland	Sweden
Tofane CC, Cortina d'Ampezzo Skip: Andrea Pavani; Third: Adriano Lorenzi; Second: Fabio Alvera; Lead: Stefano Morona; Alternate: Stefano Zardini	Snarøen CC, Oslo Skip: Eigil Ramsfjell; Third: Sjur Loen; Second: Morten Søgaard; Lead: Bo Bakke; Alternate: Morten Skaug	Carmunnock & Rutherglen CC, Glasgow Skip: Graeme Adam; Third: Ken Horton; Second: Andrew McQuistin; Lead: Robin Copland	Frösö-Oden CK, Östersund Skip: Thomas Norgren; Third: Jan-Olov Nässén; Second: Anders Lööf; Lead: Mikael Ljungberg; Alternate: Peter Cederwall
Switzerland	United States		
Lausanne-Olympique CC, Lausanne Skip: Patrick Hürlimann; Third: Andreas Hänni; Second: Patrik Lörtscher; Lead: Mario Gross	Granite CC, Seattle, Washington Skip: Jim Vukich; Third: Curtis Fish; Second: Bard Nordlund; Lead: Jim Pleasants; Alternate: Jason Larway		

== Round-robin standings ==
Country	Skip	W	L
Norway	Eigil Ramsfjell	7	2
Sweden	Thomas Norgren	7	2
Canada	Pat Ryan	6	3
Switzerland	Patrick Hürlimann	6	3
Scotland	Graeme Adam	5	4
Denmark	Tommy Stjerne	4	5
France	Dominique Dupont-Roc	3	6
Germany	Roland Jentsch	3	6
Italy	Andrea Pavani	3	6
United States	Jim Vukich	1	8

== Round-robin results ==
=== Draw 1 ===
Sheet A	Final
Sweden (Norgren)	8
Italy (Pavani)	4

Sheet B	Final
Switzerland (Hürlimann)	7
United States (Vukich)	4

Sheet C	Final
Germany (Jentsch)	7
Canada (Ryan)	3

Sheet D	Final
Norway (Ramsfjell)	0
Scotland (Adam)	7

Sheet E	Final
France (Dupont-Roc)	4
Denmark (Stjerne)	6

=== Draw 2 ===
Sheet A	Final
France (Dupont-Roc)	2
Switzerland (Hürlimann)	8

Sheet B	Final
Canada (Ryan)	4
Denmark (Stjerne)	0

Sheet C	Final
Sweden (Norgren)	5
Norway (Ramsfjell)	7

Sheet D	Final
Germany (Jentsch)	1
Italy (Pavani)	3

Sheet E	Final
United States (Vukich)	3
Scotland (Adam)	5

=== Draw 3 ===
Sheet A	Final
Scotland (Adam)	3
Denmark (Stjerne)	2

Sheet B	Final
Italy (Pavani)	3
Norway (Ramsfjell)	8

Sheet C	Final
United States (Vukich)	7
Sweden (Norgren)	10

Sheet D	Final
Canada (Ryan)	7
Sweden (Norgren)	3

Sheet E	Final
Germany (Jentsch)	4
Switzerland (Hürlimann)	8

=== Draw 4 ===
Sheet A	Final
Italy (Pavani)	3
United States (Vukich)	1

Sheet B	Final
Germany (Jentsch)	1
Sweden (Norgren)	5

Sheet C	Final
Switzerland (Hürlimann)	6
Denmark (Stjerne)	1

Sheet D	Final
Scotland (Adam)	7
France (Dupont-Roc)	3

Sheet E	Final
Norway (Ramsfjell)	10
Canada (Ryan)	7

=== Draw 5 ===
Sheet A	Final
Denmark (Stjerne)	5
Norway (Ramsfjell)	4

Sheet B	Final
Sweden (Norgren)	6
Scotland (Adam)	5

Sheet C	Final
Canada (Ryan)	5
Switzerland (Hürlimann)	3

Sheet D	Final
United States (Vukich)	6
Germany (Jentsch)	5

Sheet E	Final
Italy (Pavani)	5
France (Dupont-Roc)	6

=== Draw 6 ===
Sheet A	Final
Germany (Jentsch)	2
France (Dupont-Roc)	8

Sheet B	Final
United States (Vukich)	3
Canada (Ryan)	8

Sheet C	Final
Italy (Pavani)	2
Scotland (Adam)	6

Sheet D	Final
Switzerland (Hürlimann)	4
Norway (Ramsfjell)	9

Sheet E	Final
Denmark (Stjerne)	6
Sweden (Norgren)	7

=== Draw 7 ===
Sheet A	Final
Switzerland (Hürlimann)	6
Sweden (Norgren)	7

Sheet B	Final
Denmark (Stjerne)	5
Italy (Pavani)	9

Sheet C	Final
Norway (Ramsfjell)	11
United States (Vukich)	3

Sheet D	Final
France (Dupont-Roc)	2
Canada (Ryan)	3

Sheet E	Final
Scotland (Adam)	5
Germany (Jentsch)	6

=== Draw 8 ===
Sheet A	Final
Canada (Ryan)	5
Scotland (Adam)	4

Sheet B	Final
Norway (Ramsfjell)	7
France (Dupont-Roc)	6

Sheet C	Final
Denmark (Stjerne)	6
Germany (Jentsch)	7

Sheet D	Final
Italy (Pavani)	5
Switzerland (Hürlimann)	7

Sheet E	Final
Sweden (Norgren)	8
United States (Vukich)	5

=== Draw 9 ===
Sheet A	Final
Norway (Ramsfjell)	8
Germany (Jentsch)	2

Sheet B	Final
Scotland (Adam)	2
Switzerland (Hürlimann)	6

Sheet C	Final
France (Dupont-Roc)	3
Sweden (Norgren)	5

Sheet D	Final
Denmark (Stjerne)	5
United States (Vukich)	4

Sheet E	Final
Canada (Ryan)	7
Italy (Pavani)	4

== Tiebreakers ==
Sheet A	Final
Italy (Pavani)	8
France (Dupont-Roc)	3

Sheet A	Final
Germany (Jentsch)	8
France (Dupont-Roc)	7

== Playoffs ==
Semifinals
1	Norway	2
4	Switzerland	4
2	Sweden	3
3	Canada	4

Final
4	Switzerland	4
3	Canada	5

=== Semifinals ===
Sheet B	Final
Norway (Ramsfjell)	2
Switzerland (Hürlimann)	4

Sheet B	Final
Sweden (Norgren)	3
Canada (Ryan)	4

=== Finals ===
Team	1	2	3	4	5	6	7	8	9	10	Final
Switzerland (Hürlimann) 🔨	0	0	1	0	1	0	0	2	0	0	4
Canada (Ryan)	0	0	0	1	0	0	2	0	1	1	5

1989 WCF Curling Championship
(Canada)
Canada
19th title
