= David Smith (curler) =

Scottish curler

- Curler ♂

Team
- Skip: Warwick Smith
- Third: David Smith
- Second: Sandy Reid
- Lead: Ross Hepburn

Curling career
- World Championship: 10 (1984, 1986, 1988, 1990, 1991, 1993, 1996, 1998, 2007, 2010)
Medal record
Men's curling
World Curling Championships
Gold medal – first place	1991 Winnipeg
Silver medal – second place	1986 Toronto
Silver medal – second place	1990 Västerås
Silver medal – second place	1993 Geneva
Silver medal – second place	1996 Hamilton
Bronze medal – third place	1988 Lausanne
Bronze medal – third place	2010 Cortina d'Ampezzo
European Curling Championships
Gold medal – first place	1982 Kirkcaldy
Gold medal – first place	1988 Perth
Silver medal – second place	1991 Chamonix
Silver medal – second place	1998 Flims
Bronze medal – third place	1983 Västerås
Bronze medal – third place	1992 Perth
World Junior Curling Championships
Bronze medal – third place	1983 Medicine Hat
Bronze medal – third place	1984 Cornwall
Bronze medal – third place	1985 Perth
World Senior Curling Championships
Silver medal – second place	2019 Stavanger

David Smith (born c. 1963) is a Scottish curler. He is the brother of curler Peter Smith and the father of curlers Mili Smith, Kyle Smith and Cameron Smith.

== Career ==
In his very first international competition, the 1982 European Curling Championships, Smith won a gold medal playing second for Mike Hay. Hay and Smith were still juniors at the time and they won three straight bronze medals at the World Junior Curling Championships in 1983, 1984 and 1985. In the meantime, they won a bronze medal at the European Championships in 1983.

By 1986, Smith was skipping his own team. He won a silver medal at his second World Curling Championships that year. His Scottish team lost to Canada, skipped by Ed Lukowich in the final 4-3. Two years later, he skipped the British team to an eighth-place finish at the 1988 Winter Olympics (curling was just a demonstration sport). That same year he won a bronze at the World Championships. Still in the same year, he won a second gold medal at the European Curling Championships.

In 1990 he won another silver medal at the World Championships, losing to Canada's Ed Werenich in the final 3-1. The following year he won the gold medal, defeating Canada's Kevin Martin in the final 7-2. Later that year he won a silver at the 1991 European Curling Championships followed by a bronze in 1992. In 1993 he won his third silver medal at the World Championships, losing again to Canada 8-4, this time skipped by Russ Howard.

In 1996, Smith joined forces with Warwick Smith, playing as his third. That year he won another silver medal losing once again to Canada – 6-2. Jeff Stoughton was the winning skip. In 1998, David Smith played his last Worlds as a skip, finishing in fourth place. Later that year he played third for Gordon Muirhead winning a silver medal at the European Championships.

Smith would not play at another international tournament until the 2007 Ford World Men's Curling Championship, playing second for Warwick. It would be David Smith's worst performance at an international tournament, when they finished in 9th place.

== Personal life ==
At the time of the 1996 Worlds, he was employed as a farmer.
