= Tore Torvbråten =

Norwegian curler and Olympic medalist

Personal information
- Born: 28 January 1968 (age 58) Oslo, Norway

Sport
- Sport: Curling
- Club: Snarøen CC
Medal record
Representing Norway
Men's Curling
Olympic Games
Bronze medal – third place	1998 Nagano	Team
World Championships
Bronze medal – third place	2001 Lausanne	Team
World Junior Curling Championships
Bronze medal – third place	1987 Victoria	Team

Tore Torvbråten (born 28 January 1968) is a Norwegian curler and Olympic medalist. He received a bronze medal at the 1998 Winter Olympics in Nagano.

He received a bronze medal at the 2001 World Championships in Lausanne; the Norwegian team lost 3–4 to Sweden in the semi-final, and beat Canada 10–9 in the bronze final.
