= Dominic Andres =

Swiss curler (born 1972)

Medal record

Representing Switzerland

Men's Curling

Olympic Games
Gold medal – first place	1998 Nagano	Team

World championships
Bronze medal – third place	1994 Oberstdorf	Team
Bronze medal – third place	1999 Saint John	Team

World Junior Curling Championships
Bronze medal – third place	1991 Glasgow	Team

Dominic Andres (born 6 October 1972) is a Swiss curler and Olympic champion. He received a gold medal at the 1998 Winter Olympics in Nagano.

He was skip for the Swiss team that received a bronze medal at the 1991 World Junior Curling Championships (shared with the United States team). He received bronze medals at the 1994 and the 1999 World Curling Championships.
