= Don McKenzie (curler) =

Canadian male curler

- Curler ♂
- Born: November 5, 1957 (age 69); Edmonton, Alberta, Canada

Team
- Curling club: Ottewell CC, Edmonton, AB

Curling career
- Member Association: Alberta
- Brier: 3: (1985, 1988, 1989)
- World Championship: 2 (1988, 1989)
Medal record
Curling
Representing Canada
World Championships
Gold medal – first place	1989 Milwaukee
Silver medal – second place	1988 Lausanne
Representing Alberta
Labatt Brier
Gold medal – first place	1988 Chicoutimi
Gold medal – first place	1989 Saskatoon
Silver medal – second place	1985 Moncton
Canadian Olympic Curling Trials
Silver medal – second place	1987 Calgary
Canadian Senior Championships
Silver medal – second place	2011 Digby

Donald J. McKenzie (born November 5, 1957) is a Canadian curler, 1989 World Men's champion and 1988 World Men's silver medallist; he is a two-time Brier champion (1988, 1989).

== Awards ==
- Canadian Curling Hall of Fame: 1993 (as "MacKenzie, Donald J. 'Don'")
- Alberta Sports Hall of Fame: 1999 (with all Pat Ryan team 1985–1989)

== Teams ==
Season	Skip	Third	Second	Lead	Alternate	Events
1984–85	Pat Ryan	Gord Trenchie	Don McKenzie	Don Walchuk	Don Bartlett	Brier 1985 (silver)
1986–87	Pat Ryan	Randy Ferbey	Don Walchuk	Don McKenzie		COCT 1897 (silver)
1987–88	Pat Ryan	Randy Ferbey	Don Walchuk	Don McKenzie	Roy Hebert (Brier)	Brier 1988 (gold); WCC 1988 (silver)
1988–89	Pat Ryan	Randy Ferbey	Don Walchuk	Don McKenzie	Murray Ursulak	Brier 1989 (gold); WCC 1989 (gold)
2010–11	Brad Hannah	Gary Greening	Don McKenzie	Lance Dealy		CSCC 2011 (silver)

== Personal life ==
He started curling in 1970 when he was 13 years old.
