= Patrik Lörtscher =

Swiss curler (born 1960)

Medal record

Representing Switzerland

Men's Curling

Olympic Games
Gold medal – first place	1998 Nagano	Team

World Curling Championships
Gold medal – first place	1981 London	Team
Silver medal – second place	1982 Garmisch-Partenkirchen	Team
Silver medal – second place	1989 Milwaukee	Team
Bronze medal – third place	1980 Moncton	Team
Bronze medal – third place	1996 Hamilton	Team
Bronze medal – third place	1999 Saint John	Team

European Curling Championships
Gold medal – first place	1978 Aviemore	Team
Gold medal – first place	1981 Grindelwald	Team

Patrik Lörtscher (born 19 March 1960) is a Swiss curler, an Olympic champion and world champion. He received a gold medal at the 1998 Winter Olympics in Nagano. He was the world champion in 1981, and the European champion in 1978 and 1981.
