= Ivan Frederiksen =

Danish male curler and coach

- Curler ♂

Team
- Curling club: Hvidovre CC, Hvidovre

Curling career
- Member Association: Denmark
- World Championship: 6 (1986, 1989, 1990, 1998, 2005, 2007)
- European Championship: 8 (1985, 1986, 1990, 1992, 1993, 1995, 1998, 2006)
Medal record
Curling
World Championships
Bronze medal – third place	1990 Västerås
European Championships
Silver medal – second place	1993 Leukerbad
Danish Men's Championship
Gold medal – first place	1986
Gold medal – first place	1989
Gold medal – first place	1990
Gold medal – first place	1992
Gold medal – first place	1997
Gold medal – first place	1998
Gold medal – first place	2007
Gold medal – first place	2011

Ivan Frederiksen is a Danish curler and curling coach. He came third in the 1990 World Men's Championships.

== Teams ==
Season	Skip	Third	Second	Lead	Alternate	Coach	Events
1985–86	Tommy Stjerne	Per Berg	Peter Andersen	Ivan Frederiksen	Michael Harry (WCC)		ECC 1985 (4th); DMCC 1986 (gold); WCC 1986 (8th)
1986–87	Tommy Stjerne	Per Berg	Peter Andersen	Ivan Frederiksen			ECC 1986 (7th)
1988–89	Tommy Stjerne	Per Berg	Peter Andersen	Anders Søderblom	Ivan Frederiksen		DMCC 1989 (gold); WCC 1989 (6th)
1989–90	Tommy Stjerne	Per Berg	Peter Andersen	Ivan Frederiksen	Anders Søderblom		DMCC 1990 (gold); WCC 1990 (bronze)
1990–91	Tommy Stjerne	Per Berg	Ivan Frederiksen	Anders Søderblom	Peter Andersen		ECC 1990 (9th)
1991–92	Tommy Stjerne	Per Berg	Peter Andersen	Anders Søderblom	Ivan Frederiksen		DMCC 1992 (gold)
1992–93	Tommy Stjerne	Per Berg	Peter Andersen	Ivan Frederiksen	Anders Søderblom		ECC 1992 (8th)
1993–94	Tommy Stjerne	Per Berg	Peter Andersen	Ivan Frederiksen	Anders Søderblom		ECC 1993 (silver)
1994–95	Tommy Stjerne	Anders Søderblom	Peter Andersen	Ivan Frederiksen			
1995–96	Tommy Stjerne	Per Berg	Peter Andersen	Ivan Frederiksen	Anders Søderblom	Frants Gufler	ECC 1995 (9th)
1996–97	Tommy Stjerne	Gert Larsen	Peter Andersen	Ivan Frederiksen	Ivan Frederiksen		DMCC 1997 (gold)
1997–98	Tommy Stjerne	Gert Larsen	Peter Andersen	Ivan Frederiksen	Anders Søderblom		DMCC 1998 (gold); WCC 1998 (7th)
1998–99	Tommy Stjerne	Gert Larsen	Peter Andersen	Ivan Frederiksen	Anders Søderblom	Mikael Qvist, Olle Brudsten	ECC 1998 (7th)
2004–05	Johnny Frederiksen	Lars Vilandt	Kenneth Hertsdahl	Bo Jensen	Ivan Frederiksen	Rene Arnsfelt	WCC 2005 (11th)
2006–07	Johnny Frederiksen	Lars Vilandt	Bo Jensen	Kenneth Hertsdahl	Ivan Frederiksen	Rene Arnsfelt	DMCC 2007 (gold); WCC 2007 (11th)
2010–11	Tommy Stjerne	Anders Søderblom	Peter Andersen	Ivan Frederiksen	Per Berg		DMCC 2011 (gold)
2012–13	Tommy Stjerne	Anders Søderblom	Per Berg	Ivan Frederiksen	Peter Andersen		DMCC 2013 (4th)
2013–14	Tommy Stjerne	Per Berg	Peter Andersen	Anders Søderblom	Ivan Frederiksen		DMCC 2014 (6th)
2014–15	Tommy Stjerne	Anders Søderblom	Peter Andersen	Ivan Frederiksen			

== Record as a coach of national teams ==
Year	Tournament, event	National team	Place
2004	2004 World Junior Curling Championships	Denmark (junior men)	10
2005	2005 European Junior Curling Challenge	Denmark (junior men)	1st place, gold medalist(s)

== Personal life ==
His son Johnny is also a curler.
