= Patrick Hürlimann =

Swiss curler (born 1963)

- Curler
- Born: 9 July 1963 (age 63)

Curling career
- World Championship: 7 (1986, 1989, 1996, 1999, 2000, 2002, 2008)
- European Championship: 3 (1985, 1997, 1999)
- Olympic: 1 (1998)
Medal record
Representing Switzerland
Men's Curling
Olympic Games
Gold medal – first place	1998 Nagano	Team
World Championships
Silver medal – second place	1989 Milwaukee	Team
Bronze medal – third place	1996 Hamilton	Team
Bronze medal – third place	1999 Saint John	Team

Patrick Hürlimann (born 9 July 1963) is a Swiss curler, Olympic champion, and Vice-President of the World Curling Federation (WCF). He received a gold medal at the 1998 Winter Olympics in Nagano. He has received three medals at the World Curling Championships as skip for the Swiss team.

As head of the Marketing and Communications Committee of the WCF, Patrick Hürlimann developed the system of points used for the ranking of nations that participate in international curling bonspiels.

In 2010, Hürlimann became Vice-President of the WCF. Hürlimann was inducted into the WCF Hall of Fame in 2014.

Hürlimann is married to fellow curler Janet Hürlimann. They have 3 children, including Briar Hürlimann.
