= Gordon Muirhead =

Scottish curler

Medal record

Representing Scotland

Men's Curling

World Championships
Gold medal – first place	1999 Saint John	Team
Silver medal – second place	1992 Garmisch-Partenkirchen	Team
Silver medal – second place	1993 Geneva	Team
Silver medal – second place	1995 Brandon	Team

European Championships
Gold medal – first place	1994 Sundsvall	Team
Silver medal – second place	1998 Flims	Team
Bronze medal – third place	1992 Perth	Team

Gordon Muirhead is a Scottish curler and world champion. He was alternate for the gold medal-winning Scottish team at the 1999 Ford World Curling Championships in Saint John, New Brunswick, and also won silver medals in 1992, 1993 and 1995. He received a gold medal at the 1994 European Curling Championships, a silver medal in 1998 and a bronze medal in 1992.

Gordon's daughter, Eve, won the women's 2022 Olympic gold for Great Britain in Beijing, the 2013 World Championship, four World Junior Curling Championships (2007, 2008, 2009 and 2011), and was skip for Great Britain at the 2014 Sochi Winter Olympics, where she won a bronze medal. His son Thomas won a World Junior Men's Championship in 2013 at Sochi, curling for Kyle Smith's Scottish rink. His eldest son, Glen, is also a curler, who has competed at the Olympic level.
