= Diego Perren =

Swiss curler (born 1965)

Medal record

Representing Switzerland

Men's Curling

Olympic Games
Gold medal – first place	1998 Nagano	Team

World championships
Bronze medal – third place	1996 Hamilton	Team
Bronze medal – third place	1999 Saint John	Team

Diego Perren (born 10 January 1965) is a Swiss curler and Olympic champion. He received a gold medal at the 1998 Winter Olympics in Nagano.
