= David Murdoch =

Scottish curler (born 1978)

David Murdoch MBE
- Curler
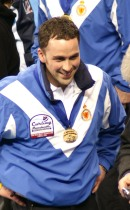
- Born: 17 April 1978 (age 48); Dumfries, Scotland

Team
- Curling club: Curl Aberdeen, Aberdeen, Scotland

Curling career
- World Championship: 8 (2005, 2006, 2008, 2009, 2010, 2013, 2015, 2017)
- European Championship: 11 (2003, 2004, 2005, 2006, 2007, 2008, 2009, 2010, 2011, 2012, 2013)
- Olympic: 3 (2006, 2010, 2014)
Medal record
Curling
Representing Great Britain
Olympic Games
Silver medal – second place	2014 Sochi
Representing Scotland
World Championships
Gold medal – first place	2006 Lowell
Gold medal – first place	2009 Moncton
Silver medal – second place	2005 Victoria
Silver medal – second place	2008 Grand Forks
Bronze medal – third place	2010 Cortina d'Ampezzo
Bronze medal – third place	2013 Victoria
European Championships
Gold medal – first place	2003 Courmayeur
Gold medal – first place	2007 Füssen
Gold medal – first place	2008 Örnsköldsvik
Silver medal – second place	2006 Basel
Bronze medal – third place	2005 Garmisch-Partenkirchen
Bronze medal – third place	2013 Stavanger
World Junior Championships
Gold medal – first place	1995 Perth
Gold medal – first place	1996 Red Deer
Silver medal – second place	1998 Thunder Bay

David Murdoch (born 17 April 1978) is a Scottish retired curler. As the Scotland skip, he and his former team of Ewan MacDonald, Warwick Smith, Euan Byers and Peter Smith are the 2006 and 2009 World Curling Champions. Representing Great Britain, he has been skip at three Winter Olympics, Torino 2006, finishing fourth, Vancouver 2010, finishing fifth and Sochi 2014, where he won an Olympic silver medal. He served as national and Olympic coach for British Curling since September 2018, before being named Curling Canada's high-performance director in early 2023.

== Sporting career ==
=== Junior ===
Murdoch is a two time World Junior Curling Champion – in 1995, as an alternate for Tom Brewster, Jr., and in 1996 as a lead for James Dryburgh. In 1998 he won a silver medal at the World Juniors as a third for Garry MacKay. By 1999, Murdoch had moved up to the position of skip, and led Scotland to a 6–3 record and fifth place at that year's world juniors. Four years later, he led Scotland to the European Championship title, beating Peja Lindholm's formidable Sweden team in the final.

=== Men's ===
In 2005, Murdoch went to his first ever World Championships. At the 2005 Ford World Men's Curling Championship his Scotland rink won the silver medal after losing to Canada's Randy Ferbey in the final. The team's fine run of form ensured all four members a place in the Great Britain men's squad for the 2006 Winter Olympics, with Murdoch in the position of skip. At the Olympics, Murdoch and his team lost in the bronze medal match to Pete Fenson of the United States. Two months later, Murdoch would avenge his defeat in 2005 by winning the gold medal at the 2006 World Men's Curling Championship. Murdoch defeated Canada (skipped by Jean-Michel Ménard) in the final. In December 2006 he won the silver medal in the European Championships in Basel, Switzerland, and followed that up with gold in 2007. He successfully defended his title at the European Curling Championships 2008 against Norway's Thomas Ulsrud.

Murdoch and his team represented Scotland again at the 2008 World Men's Curling Championship, where he lost to Canada in the final.

In 2009, Murdoch once again won a gold medal for Scotland at the World Men's Curling Championship, which was held in Moncton, New Brunswick.

On 17 January 2010, Murdoch's rink became the first non-Canadian team to win the TSN Skins Game. His team won $70,500 (£43,000) for the win.

After the 2009–10 season, Murdoch's Olympic team broke up.

In 2012, Murdoch teamed up with Tom Brewster's rink. The 2012–13 season saw them win the Edinburgh Invitational in late 2012 and the German Masters in Hamburg in January 2013. With Murdoch as skip, they won bronze at the 2013 World Championships. The team took bronze at the 2013 European Championships. In October 2013, he was selected to skip the Great Britain squad at the 2014 Winter Olympics. where he won a silver medal, losing to Canada's Brad Jacobs in the final. His 12 curling matches as skip of the Team GB men at the Sochi Olympics saw his last stones win crucial games including a vital play off against Norway in which his shot was dubbed by national press as ‘shot of the century’ to make the semi-finals and then a last shot against Sweden to secure a silver medal and Olympic final place. The silver medal was the first for Team GB men’s curling since the 1924 games. Curling coverage at Sochi was seen for 30 hours and was the most talked about sport on social media.

However, Murdoch's rink endured what he described as "a difficult year" following the 2014 Olympics: they lost in the final of the Scottish Championships in February 2015 to defending champion and former team-mate Ewan MacDonald's team, denying Team Murdoch a place at the 2015 Ford World Men's Curling Championship, before finishing third in the Scottish qualifying tournament held in October of that year for the 2015 European Curling Championships behind Kyle Smith and former team-mate Tom Brewster's rinks, thus failing to secure selection. In 2016 Team Murdoch were runners-up to Team Brewster in both the Scottish championships in February and the European Playdowns in October. Murdoch's rink were selected to compete for Scotland at the 2017 World Curling Championship, where they secured qualification for Team GB to the 2018 Winter Olympics by finishing sixth: however in June 2017 it was announced that Kyle Smith's team had been chosen to compete at the 2018 Games over Team Murdoch and Team Brewster. On 13 July 2017 Murdoch announced his retirement from his playing career, and will begin coaching.

Murdoch has commentated and taken part in studio analysis on curling for Eurosport for many years and Channel 4 for the 2014 Winter Paralympics. He has appeared recently on many TV & Radio shows including: Sport Relief 2014, Daybreak, The Alan Titchmarsh Show, Sky Sports, Sky 1’s Game Changers, BT Sport’s Panel with Tim Lovejoy and Matt Dawson, BBC Radio 2 with Anneka Rice, BBC Radio 5 Live with Danny Baker and Shelagh Fogarty, Talksport and recently being a winning panellist on A Question of Sport. As a lottery funded athlete, he has also officially released the National Lottery draw live on BBC alongside Kate Garraway to over 10 million viewers. He has also featured alongside the rest of the GB curling team on Eggheads for BBC2, as broadcast in February 2015. The team won the Daily Record ‘Team of the year’ award at the recent Our Heroes ceremony. David is a keen supporter of many charities and good causes, his charity work includes giving out Duke of Edinburgh awards regularly, most recently at Holyrood in the presence of Prince Philip, Duke of Edinburgh. He and his King Charles spaniel also recently supported the PDSA at a charity campaign photo shoot. He has also taken part in a charity curling calendar featuring as one of the world’s elite curlers. Recently David and the team supported Sport Relief at a special night televised by the BBC in London with Sebastian Coe and many summer Olympic legends at the Olympic park and later flew up to Glasgow to launch the Sport Relief mile.

== Personal ==
David Murdoch is from a talented curling family being the brother of Olympic coach Nancy Murdoch and former European Champion Neil Murdoch. The siblings' mother, Marion Murdoch, is a curling coach who was given a lifetime achievement award by Sportscotland in 2015 for her coaching work. She has been credited by David as "a big part of how (he) ended up being a competitive player", and she also helped develop fellow Olympic medallists Claire Hamilton and Anna Sloan.

As a ten-year-old boy, Murdoch was an eyewitness to the crash of Pan Am Flight 103 over Lockerbie, the town where he grew up.

Murdoch's father, former Scottish curling champion Matthew Murdoch, 70, died 12 days after watching his son win silver at the 2014 Winter Olympics.

He is married and has a daughter.

Murdoch was appointed Member of the Order of the British Empire (MBE) in the 2022 Birthday Honours for services to curling.

He currently resides in Okotoks, Alberta.

== Teams ==
Season	Skip	Third	Second	Lead	Alternate
2002–03	David Murdoch	Craig Wilson	Neil Murdoch	Euan Byers	
2003–04	David Murdoch	Euan Byers	Neil Murdoch	Craig Wilson	Ronald Brewster
2004–05	David Murdoch	Craig Wilson	Neil Murdoch	Euan Byers	Ronald Brewster / Ewan MacDonald
2005–06	David Murdoch	Euan Byers	Ewan MacDonald	Warwick Smith	Craig Wilson
2006–07	David Murdoch	Ewan MacDonald	Warwick Smith	Euan Byers	David Hay / Craig Wilson / Pete Smith
2007–08	David Murdoch	Ewan MacDonald	Peter Smith	Euan Byers	Peter Loudon
2008–09	David Murdoch	Ewan MacDonald	Peter Smith	Euan Byers	Peter Loudon
2009–10	David Murdoch	Ewan MacDonald	Peter Smith	Euan Byers	Graeme Connal
2010–11	David Murdoch	Warwick Smith	Glen Muirhead	Ross Hepburn	
2011–12	David Murdoch	Glen Muirhead	Ross Paterson	Richard Woods	
2012–13	David Murdoch	Tom Brewster	Scott Andrews	Michael Goodfellow	Greg Drummond
2013–14	David Murdoch	Greg Drummond	Scott Andrews	Michael Goodfellow	Tom Brewster
2014–15	David Murdoch	Greg Drummond	Scott Andrews	Michael Goodfellow	
2015–16	David Murdoch	Greg Drummond	Scott Andrews	Michael Goodfellow	
2016–17	David Murdoch	Greg Drummond	Scott Andrews	Michael Goodfellow	Ross Paterson

== Awards ==
- WJCC All-star lead: 1996
- WJCC All-star third: 1998

== Grand Slam record ==
Key
C	Champion
F	Lost in Final
SF	Lost in Semifinal
QF	Lost in Quarterfinals
R16	Lost in the round of 16
Q	Did not advance to playoffs
T2	Played in Tier 2 event
DNP	Did not participate in event
N/A	Not a Grand Slam event that season

Event	2005–06	2006–07	2007–08	2008–09	2009–10	2010–11	2011–12	2012–13	2013–14	2014–15	2015–16	2016–17
Masters/World Cup	DNP	DNP	DNP	DNP	Q	Q	DNP	DNP	QF	Q	Q	QF
Tour Challenge	N/A	N/A	N/A	N/A	N/A	N/A	N/A	N/A	N/A	N/A	Q	Q
The National	Q	DNP	DNP	DNP	QF	DNP	DNP	DNP	DNP	DNP	DNP	Q
Canadian Open	DNP	DNP	DNP	DNP	DNP	DNP	DNP	DNP	DNP	Q	QF	DNP
Players' Championships	DNP	DNP	DNP	DNP	DNP	DNP	DNP	DNP	Q	DNP	SF	DNP
Champions Cup	N/A	N/A	N/A	N/A	N/A	N/A	N/A	N/A	N/A	N/A	Q	DNP
