= Sjur Loen =

Norwegian curler

Medal record

Men's Curling

Representing Norway

Olympic Games
Gold medal – first place	1988 Calgary (demonstration)	Team

World Championships
Gold medal – first place	1984 Perth	Team
Gold medal – first place	1988 Lausanne	Team
Bronze medal – third place	1983 Regina	Team
Bronze medal – third place	1987 Vancouver	Team
Bronze medal – third place	1989 Milwaukee	Team
Bronze medal – third place	1991 Winnipeg	Team

European Championships
Gold medal – first place	1993 Leukerbad	Team
Silver medal – second place	1987 Oberstdorf	Team
Silver medal – second place	1988 Perth	Team
Bronze medal – third place	1985 Grindelwald	Team
Bronze medal – third place	1990 Lillehammer	Team
Bronze medal – third place	1995 Grindelwald	Team

World Junior Championships
Bronze medal – third place	1976 Aviemore	Team

Sjur Loen (born 19 May 1958, in Oppdal Municipality) is a Norwegian curler and world champion. He participated on the winning team in the demonstration event at the 1988 Winter Olympics.

== International championships ==
Loen is two times world champion, and has received four bronze medals at the world championships. He received a bronze medal as skip at the 1976 World Junior Curling Championships, and reached the bronze final in 1977 (losing to the United States), 1978 (losing to Scotland) and 1979 (losing to Canada).

Loen has obtained one victory at the European Curling Championships, two silver medals and three bronze medals.
