= Magnus Swartling =

Swedish curler and world champion (born 1970)

Medal record

Representing Sweden

Men's Curling

World championships
Gold medal – first place	1997 Berne	Team
Gold medal – first place	2001 Lausanne	Team
Gold medal – first place	2004 Gävle	Team
Silver medal – second place	1998 Kamloops	Team
Silver medal – second place	2000 Glasgow	Team

European Curling Championships
Gold medal – first place	1998 Flims	Team
Gold medal – first place	2001 Vierumäki	Team
Silver medal – second place	2002 Grindelwald	Team
Silver medal – second place	2003 Courmayeur	Team
Silver medal – second place	2004 Sofia	Team
Silver medal – second place	2005 Garmisch-Partenkirchen	Team
Bronze medal – third place	2000 Oberstdorf	Team

World Junior Curling Championships
Gold medal – first place	1989 Markham	
Silver medal – second place	1988 Füssen	
Bronze medal – third place	1990 Portage la Praire	

Magnus Swartling (born 19 February 1970 in Uppsala) is a Swedish curler and world champion.

He won a gold medal in the 1997, 2001 and 2004 World Curling Championships, all three times with skip Peja Lindholm, and received silver medals in 1998 and 2000.

Swartling is European champion from 1998 and 2001 (with skip Peja Lindholm), and has received a total of seven medals in the European championships.

Swartling has normally played Second on Lindholm's team.

Swartling participated on the European team in the Continental Cup of Curling in 2002, 2003 and 2004. In 2003 he was top male (with 22 pts) in the singles competition.

In 1998 he was inducted into the Swedish Curling Hall of Fame.
