= Eigil Ramsfjell =

Norwegian curler

- Curler
- Born: 17 March 1955 (age 71); Oslo, Norway

Team
- Curling club: Snarøen CC, Oslo

Curling career
- Member Association: Norway
- World Championship: 15 (1976, 1977, 1978, 1979, 1980, 1981, 1983, 1984, 1987, 1988, 1989, 1990, 1991, 1995, 1996)
- European Championship: 11 (1979, 1980, 1985, 1987, 1988, 1989, 1990, 1992, 1993, 1994, 1995)
- Olympic: 2 (1988, 1998)
Medal record
Representing Norway
Men's curling
Olympic Games
Gold medal – first place	1988 Calgary (demonstration)	Team
Bronze medal – third place	1998 Nagano	Team
World Championships
Gold medal – first place	1979 Berne	Team
Gold medal – first place	1984 Perth	Team
Gold medal – first place	1988 Lausanne	Team
Silver medal – second place	1978 Winnipeg	Team
Silver medal – second place	1980 Moncton	Team
Bronze medal – third place	1983 Regina	Team
Bronze medal – third place	1987 Vancouver	Team
Bronze medal – third place	1989 Milwaukee	Team
Bronze medal – third place	1991 Winnipeg	Team
European Championships
Gold medal – first place	1993 Leukerbad	Team
Silver medal – second place	1980 Copenhagen	Team
Silver medal – second place	1987 Oberstdorf	Team
Silver medal – second place	1988 Perth	Team
Silver medal – second place	1989 Engelberg	Team
Bronze medal – third place	1979 Varese	Team
Bronze medal – third place	1985 Grindelwald	Team
Bronze medal – third place	1990 Lillehammer	Team
Bronze medal – third place	1995 Grindelwald	Team

Eigil Ramsfjell (born 17 March 1955 in Oslo) is a Norwegian curler, world champion and Olympic medalist. Many consider him one of the pioneers in modern curling. He received a bronze medal as skip at the 1998 Winter Olympics in Nagano. He was skip on the gold winning team when curling was a demonstration event at the 1988 Winter Olympics in Calgary.

Ramsfjell is a three-time world champion, and has also received silver and bronze medals at the world championships. He was inducted into the World Curling Federation Hall of Fame in 2014.

His son, Magnus followed in his footsteps, and is a former World Junior bronze medalist; his daughter Maia is a Norwegian curling champion.
