= Bo Bakke =

Norwegian curler and world champion

Medal record

Representing Norway

Men's Curling

Olympic Games
Gold medal – first place	1988 Calgary (demonstration)	Team

World Championships
Gold medal – first place	1984 Duluth	Team
Gold medal – first place	1988 Lausanne	Team
Bronze medal – third place	1983 Regina	Team
Bronze medal – third place	1987 Vancouver	Team
Bronze medal – third place	1989 Milwaukee	Team

European Championships
Silver medal – second place	1987 Oberstdorf	Team

Bo Sven Sune Bakke (born 3 May 1955 in Asker) is a Norwegian curler and world champion. He participated on the winning team in the demonstration event at the 1988 Winter Olympics.

== International championships ==
Bakke is two times world champion, and has obtained one silver medal at the European Curling Championships.
