= Murray Ursulak =

Canadian male curler

- Curler ♂
- Other names: Murray Ursuliak

Team
- Curling club: Ottewell CC, Edmonton, AB

Curling career
- Member Association: Alberta
- Brier: 1 (1989)
- World Championship: 1 (1989)
- Other appearances: World Junior Championships: 1 (1979)
Medal record
Curling
Representing Canada
World Championships
Gold medal – first place	1989 Milwaukee
World Junior Championships
Gold medal – first place	1979 Moose Jaw
Representing Alberta
Labatt Brier
Gold medal – first place	1989 Saskatoon

Murray R. Ursulak is a Canadian curler, 1989 World Men's champion and 1989 Brier champion.

== Teams ==
Season	Skip	Third	Second	Lead	Alternate	Events
1977–78	Darren Fish	Lorne Barker	Murray Ursulak	Barry Barker		CJCC 1978 (gold)
1978–79	Darren Fish	Lorne Barker	Murray Ursulak	Randy Ursuliak		WJCC 1979 (gold)
1988–89	Pat Ryan	Randy Ferbey	Don Walchuk	Don McKenzie	Murray Ursulak	Brier 1989 (gold); WCC 1989 (gold)

== Personal life ==
His distant cousin Wally is a 1961 World and 1961 Brier champion. His brother Randy is a curler too, and were teammates when they won the 1979 World Juniors. His son Richard Ursulak was drafted 280 overall in the 2006 WHL Bantam draft by the Tri-City Americans.
