= Gunnar Meland =

Norwegian curler

Medal record

Representing Norway

Men's Curling

Olympic Games
Gold medal – first place	1988 Calgary (demonstration)	Team

World Championships
Gold medal – first place	1979 Berne	Team
Gold medal – first place	1984 Perth	Team
Silver medal – second place	1978 Winnipeg	Team
Bronze medal – third place	1983 Regina	Team

European Championships
Silver medal – second place	1976 West Berlin	Team
Silver medal – second place	1980 Copenhagen	Team
Bronze medal – third place	1985 Grindelwald	Team

Gunnar Meland (born 21 August 1947 in Trondheim) is a Norwegian curler and world champion. He participated on the winning team in the demonstration event at the 1988 Winter Olympics.

== International championships ==
Meland is a two-time world champion, and has won two silver medals at the European Curling Championships.
