= Tomas Nordin =

Swedish curler

Medal record

Representing Sweden

Men's Curling

World championships
| Gold medal – first place | 1997 Berne | Team |
| Gold medal – first place | 2001 Lausanne | Team |
| Gold medal – first place | 2004 Gävle | Team |
| Silver medal – second place | 1998 Kamloops | Team |
| Silver medal – second place | 2000 Glasgow | Team |

European Curling Championships
| Gold medal – first place | 1998 Flims | Team |
| Gold medal – first place | 2001 Vierumäki | Team |
| Silver medal – second place | 2002 Grindelwald | Team |
| Silver medal – second place | 2003 Courmayeur | Team |
| Silver medal – second place | 2004 Sofia | Team |
| Silver medal – second place | 2005 Garmisch-Partenkirchen | Team |
| Bronze medal – third place | 2000 Oberstdorf | Team |

Tomas Nordin (born 9 October 1969) is a Swedish curler and world champion.

Born in Härnösand, Sweden, Nordin won a gold medal in the 1997, 2001 and 2004 World Curling Championships, all three times with skip Peja Lindholm, and received silver medal in 1998 and 2000.

He is European champion from 1998 and 2001 (with skip Peja Lindholm), and has received a total of seven medals in the European championships.

In 1998 he was inducted into the Swedish Curling Hall of Fame.
