= Craig Wilson (curler) =

Scottish curler (born 1973)

Medal record

Curling

Representing Scotland

World Championships
Silver medal – second place	2005 Victoria	
Bronze medal – third place	2010 Cortina d'Ampezzo	

European Championships
Gold medal – first place	2003 Courmayeur	
Bronze medal – third place	2005 Garmisch-Partenkirchen	

World Junior Championships
Gold medal – first place	1993 Grindelwald	

Craig Wilson (born 14 September 1973 in Dumfries) is a Scottish curler from Dunblane. In 1993, Wilson won the World Junior Curling Championships for his Scotland team over Michel Ferland of Canada. However, the following year he would finish 5th.

Wilson wouldn't return to an international event until 2003 when he played third for David Murdoch and won a gold medal at the European Curling Championships. At the 2005 Ford World Men's Curling Championship, Wilson would win a silver medal with Murdoch as they lost to Canada's Randy Ferbey team in the final.

Wilson was picked to be the alternate player for team Great Britain at the 2006 Winter Olympics.

In later years Wilson turned his hand to golf and hones his craft at Dunblane GC. He is currently training hard at the Peebles golf camp.
