= Peter Smith (curler) =

Scottish curler (born 1964)

- Curler
- Born: 18 November 1964 (age 61); Perth, Scotland
- Height: 6 ft 2 in (188 cm)
Medal record
Curling
World Championships
Gold medal – first place	1991 Winnipeg
Gold medal – first place	2006 Lowell
Gold medal – first place	2009 Moncton
Silver medal – second place	1986 Toronto
Silver medal – second place	1990 Västerås
Silver medal – second place	1993 Geneva
Silver medal – second place	1996 Hamilton
Silver medal – second place	2008 Grand Forks
Bronze medal – third place	1988 Lausanne
European Championships
Gold medal – first place	1988 Perth
Gold medal – first place	2007 Füssen
Gold medal – first place	2008 Örnsköldsvik
Silver medal – second place	1991 Chamonix
Silver medal – second place	1998 Flims
Silver medal – second place	2006 Basel
Bronze medal – third place	1992 Perth
World Junior Championships
Gold medal – first place	1986 Dartmouth
World Senior Championships
Silver medal – second place	2019 Stavanger

Peter Smith (born 18 November 1964) is a Scottish curler. He played second for David Murdoch from 2006 to 2010, including curling at the 2010 Winter Olympics.

Smith started curling in 1979. He plays in second position and is right-handed. He has won many prizes in his career, but never featured on the Winter Olympics medal podium. Peter Smith was the tallest male curler at the 2010 Winter Olympics at 6"2. He is nicknamed "Pistol Pete" for his notable accuracy. In 2023, he was inducted into the World Curling Federation Hall of Fame.

He is the brother of curler David Smith and the uncle of curlers Kyle, Cameron, and Mili Smith.
