= 1961 Macdonald Brier =

Canadian men's curling championship

- Host city: Calgary, Alberta
- Arena: Stampede Corral
- Dates: March 6–10
- Attendance: 51,575
- Winner: Alberta
- Curling club: Alberta Avenue CC, Edmonton
- Skip: Hec Gervais
- Third: Ron Anton
- Second: Ray Werner
- Lead: Wally Ursuliak

The 1961 Macdonald Brier, the Canadian men's national curling championship, was held from March 6 to 10, 1961 at the Stampede Corral in Calgary, Alberta. A total of 51,575 fans attended the event, which was only 150 fans short of the record set in 1955 Brier in Regina. Due to issues during the 1960 Brier with brooms shredding (causing numerous delays to clean the ice during games), curlers no longer could choose their own broom and instead could only use brooms provided by the Brier committee. Previously, the Brier committee had always supplied brooms, but curlers were permitted to use their own if desired.

Team Alberta, skipped by Hec Gervais, captured the Brier Tankard with a record of 9–1 in round robin play. This was the eighth time in which Alberta had captured the Brier championship and the first of two Briers in which Gervais won as a skip. At the age of 27 years and 4 months, Gervais became the youngest skip to win a Brier at the time, surpassing Matt Baldwin's record by six months when he won the 1954 Brier.

Gervais' rink (with Vic Raymer in place of Ron Anton) would go on to complete in the 1961 Scotch Cup in Scotland, and eventually capture Canada's third straight World Championship.

== Event Summary ==
Heading into the Thursday evening draw (Draw 9), there were seven teams that were mathematically alive to win the 1961 Brier. Alberta was unbeaten with a 7–0 record and two games ahead of second place teams Manitoba, Ontario, and Saskatchewan, who all tied with 5-2 records. Prince Edward Island was sitting at 5-3 while Northern Ontario and Nova Scotia were both 4–3. That evening, Northern Ontario beat Ontario 12–9, Manitoba would hold off Quebec 14–12, Saskatchewan eliminated Nova Scotia handily 11–3, and PEI handed Alberta their first loss of the tournament with an 11–7 victory. With Alberta's loss, the standings would tighten up heading into the final day of the Brier.

The Friday morning draw (Draw 10) saw Saskatchewan beat Ontario 9-5 and Manitoba beat Northern Ontario 6–5, thus eliminating both Ontario and Northern Ontario from championship contention. With Alberta's 12–4 victory over Nova Scotia, thus eliminating PEI who had drawn a bye. The final draw of the tournament on Friday afternoon would come down to Alberta, Manitoba, and Saskatchewan with the latter two playing each other. An Alberta loss to Ontario would force a tiebreaker against the winner of the Manitoba/Saskatchewan matchup.

In the game on Sheet B between Manitoba and Saskatchewan, Saskatchewan led 3-1 after the third end but Ontario would counter and score one in each of the next two ends to tie the game at 3. However, Saskatchewan would score three in the sixth to take a 6–3 lead halfway through the game. Manitoba would cut the lead to 6-5 after a score of two in the seventh, but Saskatchewan would put the game out of reach with three in the eighth and a steal of two in the ninth and eventually beat Manitoba 12–7. Meanwhile, on Sheet C, the Alberta and Ontario game was going in similar fashion as the game was tied 3-3 after four ends. To the delight of the Saskatchewan fans, Ontario would put up three in the fifth and a steal of two in the sixth to go up 8-3 after halfway and would lead 9-4 through eight ends. That delight would be short lived however as Alberta would rally back and tie the game at 9 with four in the eighth and a steal of one in the ninth. After a blank end in the eleventh, it would come down to the final end. With Alberta having the shot rock, it would come down to Ontario skip Thomas Caldwell's final rock. Caldwell threw an out-turn on his final stone, but the stone was too far outside and smashed against the Alberta guard giving Alberta a 10–9 victory for Gervais' first Brier and a spot in the 1961 Scotch Cup.

== Teams ==
The teams are listed as follows:

Alberta	British Columbia	Manitoba	New Brunswick
Alberta Avenue CC, Edmonton Skip: Hec Gervais; Third: Ron Anton; Second: Ray Werner; Lead: Wally Ursuliak	Peace Arch CC, White Rock Skip: Tony Folk; Third: James Kilburn; Second: George Klotz; Lead: Neil Eyben	West Kildonan CC, Winnipeg Skip: John-David Lyon; Third: Leroy Herman; Second: William Zaporzan; Lead: Leo Kelsch	Campbellton CC, Campbellton Skip: John MacDonald; Third: Jack Cummins; Second: Reginald Murphy; Lead: Guy Marcoux
Newfoundland	Northern Ontario	Nova Scotia	Ontario
Blomidon CC, Corner Brook Skip: Alexander Fisher; Third: Harry Stanley; Second: Reginald Goldburg; Lead: James Tulley	Kirkland Lake CC, Kirkland Lake Skip: Jack Polyblank; Third: Frank Macdonald; Second: Earl MacInnes; Lead: Murvin Smith	Dartmouth CC, Dartmouth Skip: James Florian; Third: Peter Hope; Second: Kenneth Bell; Lead: Donald Stanhope	Champlain CC, Orillia Skip: Thomas Caldwell; Third: Ross Coward; Second: J.A. Behan; Lead: Frank Milligan
Prince Edward Island	Quebec	Saskatchewan
Charlottetown CC, Charlottetown Skip: Douglas Cameron; Third: George Dillon; Second: Allison Saunders; Lead: Arnold Llewellyn	Whitlock G & CVC, Hudson Skip: Tom Welch; Third: John Crombie; Second: Eugene Hodgson; Lead: Graham Perry	Avonlea CC, Avonlea Skip: John Keys; Third: Garnet Campbell; Second: Robert Pickering; Lead: Glen Campbell

== Round-robin standings ==
Key
Brier Champion

Province	Skip	W	L	PF	PA
Alberta	Hec Gervais	9	1	116	74
Saskatchewan	John Keys	8	2	106	65
Manitoba	John-David Lyon	7	3	104	93
Northern Ontario	Jack Polyblank	6	4	100	87
Prince Edward Island	Douglas Cameron	6	4	98	79
Ontario	Thomas Caldwell	5	5	86	87
Nova Scotia	James Florian	5	5	81	100
British Columbia	Tony Folk	5	5	91	83
Quebec	Tom Welch	2	8	85	119
Newfoundland	Alexander Fisher	1	9	74	121
New Brunswick	John MacDonald	1	9	77	110

== Round-robin results ==
All draw times are listed in Mountain Time (UTC-07:00)

=== Draw 1 ===
Monday, March 6 3:00 PM

Sheet A	1	2	3	4	5	6	7	8	9	10	11	12	Final
Prince Edward Island (Cameron)	2	0	2	0	0	2	0	3	2	1	0	0	12
Ontario (Caldwell)	0	1	0	1	0	0	3	0	0	0	2	0	7

Sheet B	1	2	3	4	5	6	7	8	9	10	11	12	Final
Saskatchewan (Keys)	0	4	1	0	2	1	0	1	0	1	1	0	11
New Brunswick (MacDonald)	0	0	0	1	0	0	1	0	2	0	0	5	9

Sheet C	1	2	3	4	5	6	7	8	9	10	11	12	Final
Northern Ontario (Polyblank)	0	1	0	1	0	4	0	2	0	1	0	0	9
British Columbia (Folk)	1	0	1	0	2	0	1	0	2	0	2	1	10

Sheet D	1	2	3	4	5	6	7	8	9	10	11	12	Final
Newfoundland (Fisher)	0	1	0	0	1	0	2	0	2	0	0	0	6
Quebec (Welch)	1	0	2	0	0	1	0	2	0	1	2	3	12

Sheet E	1	2	3	4	5	6	7	8	9	10	11	12	Final
Manitoba (Lyon)	1	0	1	0	0	2	0	1	0	0	1	0	6
Alberta (Gervais)	0	3	0	1	1	0	4	0	1	1	0	1	12

=== Draw 2 ===
Monday, March 6 8:00 PM

Sheet A	1	2	3	4	5	6	7	8	9	10	11	12	Final
Northern Ontario (Polyblank)	0	0	3	0	2	1	2	0	1	0	3	0	12
Newfoundland (Fisher)	2	1	0	2	0	0	0	2	0	1	0	1	9

Sheet B	1	2	3	4	5	6	7	8	9	10	11	12	Final
Alberta (Gervais)	2	3	0	4	0	3	2	0	2	0	1	0	17
New Brunswick (MacDonald)	0	0	1	0	4	0	0	1	0	2	0	1	9

Sheet C	1	2	3	4	5	6	7	8	9	10	11	12	13	Final
Prince Edward Island (Cameron)	0	3	0	2	0	2	0	1	1	0	0	0	0	9
Manitoba (Lyon)	2	0	2	0	1	0	2	0	0	1	0	1	1	10

Sheet D	1	2	3	4	5	6	7	8	9	10	11	12	13	Final
Ontario (Caldwell)	2	0	0	1	0	1	3	1	0	1	0	1	1	11
Nova Scotia (Florian)	0	1	3	0	1	0	0	0	2	0	3	0	0	10

Sheet E	1	2	3	4	5	6	7	8	9	10	11	12	Final
British Columbia (Folk)	1	0	2	4	0	0	0	1	0	1	0	0	9
Saskatchewan (Keys)	0	1	0	0	3	1	0	0	1	0	2	2	10

=== Draw 3 ===
Tuesday, March 7 9:30 AM

Sheet A	1	2	3	4	5	6	7	8	9	10	11	12	Final
Manitoba (Lyon)	2	0	1	1	1	0	3	3	2	0	2	0	15
Nova Scotia (Florian)	0	1	0	0	0	3	0	0	0	2	0	1	7

Sheet B	1	2	3	4	5	6	7	8	9	10	11	12	Final
British Columbia (Folk)	0	0	0	2	2	1	0	4	0	1	0	0	10
Alberta (Gervais)	2	2	2	0	0	0	1	0	3	0	0	1	11

Sheet C	1	2	3	4	5	6	7	8	9	10	11	12	Final
Newfoundland (Fisher)	0	1	0	1	0	0	0	1	0	2	0	1	6
Saskatchewan (Keys)	1	0	1	0	2	3	0	0	3	0	3	0	13

Sheet D	1	2	3	4	5	6	7	8	9	10	11	12	Final
Northern Ontario (Polyblank)	3	0	0	3	0	2	0	4	1	0	4	0	17
Quebec (Welch)	0	4	2	0	2	0	1	0	0	1	0	1	11

Sheet E	1	2	3	4	5	6	7	8	9	10	11	12	Final
Prince Edward Island (Cameron)	2	1	2	0	2	0	2	1	2	0	1	0	13
New Brunswick (MacDonald)	0	0	0	1	0	1	0	0	0	3	0	1	6

=== Draw 4 ===
Tuesday, March 7 3:00 PM

Sheet A	1	2	3	4	5	6	7	8	9	10	11	12	Final
Saskatchewan (Keys)	4	0	3	4	0	4	2	0	1	0	0	2	20
Quebec (Welch)	0	1	0	0	2	0	0	2	0	1	0	0	6

Sheet B	1	2	3	4	5	6	7	8	9	10	11	12	Final
Prince Edward Island (Cameron)	0	1	2	0	2	0	2	0	1	0	1	0	9
British Columbia (Folk)	1	0	0	1	0	2	0	2	0	2	0	2	10

Sheet C	1	2	3	4	5	6	7	8	9	10	11	12	Final
Nova Scotia (Florian)	3	1	0	1	2	0	0	1	0	0	3	0	11
New Brunswick (MacDonald)	0	0	1	0	0	2	2	0	3	0	0	1	9

Sheet D	1	2	3	4	5	6	7	8	9	10	11	12	Final
Manitoba (Lyon)	0	0	2	0	0	2	3	0	0	1	0	1	9
Ontario (Caldwell)	0	1	0	0	2	0	0	1	1	0	1	0	6

Sheet E	1	2	3	4	5	6	7	8	9	10	11	12	Final
Newfoundland (Fisher)	2	0	1	0	0	0	2	0	0	1	0	1	7
Alberta (Gervais)	0	2	0	3	3	1	0	2	1	0	1	0	13

=== Draw 5 ===
Wednesday, March 8 3:00 PM

Sheet A	1	2	3	4	5	6	7	8	9	10	11	12	Final
New Brunswick (MacDonald)	0	1	0	1	0	0	0	0	1	0	1	1	5
Ontario (Caldwell)	2	0	3	0	0	1	1	1	0	1	0	0	9

Sheet B	1	2	3	4	5	6	7	8	9	10	11	12	Final
Newfoundland (Fisher)	1	0	0	0	1	0	2	0	1	0	0	2	7
Prince Edward Island (Cameron)	0	1	0	3	0	2	0	2	0	0	3	0	11

Sheet C	1	2	3	4	5	6	7	8	9	10	11	12	Final
Quebec (Welch)	2	2	0	0	0	1	0	1	0	1	0	0	7
Alberta (Gervais)	0	0	3	1	1	0	4	0	2	0	2	1	14

Sheet D	1	2	3	4	5	6	7	8	9	10	11	12	Final
Saskatchewan (Keys)	2	0	0	0	2	0	0	2	0	1	0	1	8
Northern Ontario (Polyblank)	0	0	2	0	0	1	0	0	1	0	1	0	5

Sheet E	1	2	3	4	5	6	7	8	9	10	11	12	Final
Nova Scotia (Florian)	0	0	1	1	0	0	2	0	0	2	1	1	8
British Columbia (Folk)	1	2	0	0	0	2	0	0	1	0	0	0	6

=== Draw 6 ===
Wednesday, March 8 8:00 PM

Sheet A	1	2	3	4	5	6	7	8	9	10	11	12	Final
Alberta (Gervais)	1	0	1	0	1	0	1	2	1	0	4	2	13
Northern Ontario (Polyblank)	0	1	0	1	0	2	0	0	0	1	0	0	5

Sheet B	1	2	3	4	5	6	7	8	9	10	11	12	Final
Nova Scotia (Florian)	0	2	0	2	0	2	0	0	0	4	0	1	11
Newfoundland (Fisher)	2	0	1	0	2	0	0	1	1	0	1	0	8

Sheet C	1	2	3	4	5	6	7	8	9	10	11	12	13	Final
Ontario (Caldwell)	0	1	0	0	0	1	0	0	2	0	1	0	1	6
British Columbia (Folk)	0	0	0	1	2	0	1	0	0	0	0	1	0	5

Sheet D	1	2	3	4	5	6	7	8	9	10	11	12	Final
New Brunswick (MacDonald)	1	0	0	1	0	1	3	0	1	0	1	0	8
Manitoba (Lyon)	0	2	1	0	1	0	0	4	0	2	0	3	13

Sheet E	1	2	3	4	5	6	7	8	9	10	11	12	Final
Quebec (Welch)	0	0	2	0	0	0	1	0	0	0	1	0	4
Prince Edward Island (Cameron)	1	1	0	0	2	0	0	1	1	1	0	4	11

=== Draw 7 ===
Thursday, March 9 9:30 AM

Sheet A	1	2	3	4	5	6	7	8	9	10	11	12	Final
British Columbia (Folk)	0	1	0	3	2	2	0	1	0	2	1	0	12
Manitoba (Lyon)	3	0	1	0	0	0	0	0	1	0	0	2	7

Sheet B	1	2	3	4	5	6	7	8	9	10	11	12	13	Final
Quebec (Welch)	0	0	0	1	0	1	0	2	1	2	0	1	0	8
Nova Scotia (Florian)	2	1	1	0	1	0	2	0	0	0	1	0	1	9

Sheet C	1	2	3	4	5	6	7	8	9	10	11	12	Final
Northern Ontario (Polyblank)	0	0	2	0	2	0	1	0	0	2	0	5	12
Prince Edward Island (Cameron)	2	1	0	1	0	1	0	1	0	0	1	0	7

Sheet D	1	2	3	4	5	6	7	8	9	10	11	12	Final
Alberta (Gervais)	1	0	0	1	0	0	1	0	0	3	0	1	7
Saskatchewan (Keys)	0	1	0	0	0	1	0	0	1	0	3	0	6

Sheet E	1	2	3	4	5	6	7	8	9	10	11	12	Final
Ontario (Caldwell)	4	0	2	0	0	1	0	1	0	1	4	0	13
Newfoundland (Fisher)	0	1	0	2	1	0	0	0	1	0	0	1	6

=== Draw 8 ===
Thursday, March 9 3:00 PM

Sheet A	1	2	3	4	5	6	7	8	9	10	11	12	13	Final
Prince Edward Island (Cameron)	1	0	0	0	1	0	2	0	0	2	0	0	2	8
Saskatchewan (Keys)	0	0	0	2	0	2	0	1	0	0	0	1	0	6

Sheet B	1	2	3	4	5	6	7	8	9	10	11	12	13	Final
Ontario (Caldwell)	1	2	0	2	1	0	1	0	0	2	0	0	2	11
Quebec (Welch)	0	0	2	0	0	1	0	3	0	0	2	1	0	9

Sheet C	1	2	3	4	5	6	7	8	9	10	11	12	Final
Manitoba (Lyon)	1	0	3	0	1	1	3	0	4	3	0	1	17
Newfoundland (Fisher)	0	2	0	3	0	0	0	1	0	0	4	0	10

Sheet D	1	2	3	4	5	6	7	8	9	10	11	12	Final
British Columbia (Folk)	0	2	0	1	0	2	0	2	0	0	0	1	8
New Brunswick (MacDonald)	1	0	1	0	2	0	1	0	2	1	2	0	10

Sheet E	1	2	3	4	5	6	7	8	9	10	11	12	Final
Northern Ontario (Polyblank)	1	1	0	2	0	2	0	1	0	0	2	4	13
Nova Scotia (Florian)	0	0	3	0	1	0	1	0	2	1	0	0	8

=== Draw 9 ===
Thursday, March 9 8:00 PM

Sheet A	1	2	3	4	5	6	7	8	9	10	11	12	Final
Newfoundland (Fisher)	1	1	0	1	1	0	1	0	2	0	0	2	9
New Brunswick (MacDonald)	0	0	2	0	0	2	0	1	0	1	1	0	7

Sheet B	1	2	3	4	5	6	7	8	9	10	11	12	Final
Northern Ontario (Polyblank)	3	0	0	1	0	2	1	1	0	0	0	4	12
Ontario (Caldwell)	0	2	0	0	2	0	0	0	2	1	2	0	9

Sheet C	1	2	3	4	5	6	7	8	9	10	11	12	Final
Saskatchewan (Keys)	3	2	1	2	0	1	2	0	0	0	X	X	11
Nova Scotia (Florian)	0	0	0	0	2	0	0	0	0	1	X	X	3

Sheet D	1	2	3	4	5	6	7	8	9	10	11	12	Final
Prince Edward Island (Cameron)	2	0	1	2	0	1	0	1	3	0	1	0	11
Alberta (Gervais)	0	1	0	0	2	0	1	0	0	2	0	1	7

Sheet E	1	2	3	4	5	6	7	8	9	10	11	12	Final
Manitoba (Lyon)	3	0	0	0	0	5	0	3	1	0	2	0	14
Quebec (Welch)	0	2	2	1	1	0	2	0	0	3	0	1	12

=== Draw 10 ===
Friday, March 10 9:30 AM

Sheet A	1	2	3	4	5	6	7	8	9	10	11	12	Final
Nova Scotia (Florian)	0	2	0	0	0	0	1	0	0	1	0	0	4
Alberta (Gervais)	2	0	2	1	1	0	0	1	2	0	2	1	12

Sheet B	1	2	3	4	5	6	7	8	9	10	11	12	Final
Manitoba (Lyon)	0	0	1	0	1	0	0	0	2	1	0	1	6
Northern Ontario (Polyblank)	0	1	0	1	0	1	1	0	0	0	1	0	5

Sheet C	1	2	3	4	5	6	7	8	9	10	11	12	Final
New Brunswick (MacDonald)	2	0	3	0	0	1	1	0	0	1	0	0	8
Quebec (Welch)	0	1	0	2	1	0	0	1	1	0	2	1	9

Sheet D	1	2	3	4	5	6	7	8	9	10	11	12	Final
Newfoundland (Fisher)	1	0	2	0	0	0	1	0	0	1	0	1	6
British Columbia (Folk)	0	3	0	1	2	2	0	0	2	0	2	0	12

Sheet E	1	2	3	4	5	6	7	8	9	10	11	12	Final
Saskatchewan (Keys)	0	2	1	0	2	0	0	3	0	0	0	1	9
Ontario (Caldwell)	1	0	0	1	0	1	0	0	1	1	0	0	5

=== Draw 11 ===
Friday, March 10 3:00 PM

Sheet A	1	2	3	4	5	6	7	8	9	10	11	12	Final
Quebec (Welch)	2	2	0	0	1	0	0	1	0	0	1	0	7
British Columbia (Folk)	0	0	2	1	0	1	1	0	2	1	0	1	9

Sheet B	1	2	3	4	5	6	7	8	9	10	11	12	Final
Saskatchewan (Keys)	1	0	2	0	0	3	0	3	2	0	0	1	12
Manitoba (Lyon)	0	1	0	1	1	0	2	0	0	2	0	0	7

Sheet C	1	2	3	4	5	6	7	8	9	10	11	12	Final
Alberta (Gervais)	0	2	0	1	0	0	1	0	4	1	0	1	10
Ontario (Caldwell)	1	0	2	0	3	2	0	1	0	0	0	0	9

Sheet D	1	2	3	4	5	6	7	8	9	10	11	12	Final
Nova Scotia (Florian)	0	2	0	2	1	0	1	1	0	1	0	2	10
Prince Edward Island (Cameron)	1	0	3	0	0	1	0	0	1	0	1	0	7

Sheet E	1	2	3	4	5	6	7	8	9	10	11	12	Final
New Brunswick (MacDonald)	1	0	2	0	1	0	0	1	0	0	1	0	6
Northern Ontario (Polyblank)	0	1	0	1	0	3	2	0	0	2	0	1	10
