= 1981 Labatt Brier =

Canada's men's curling championship

- Host city: Halifax, Nova Scotia
- Arena: Halifax Metro Centre
- Dates: March 1–8
- Attendance: 67,257
- Winner: Manitoba
- Curling club: Assiniboine Memorial CC, Winnipeg
- Skip: Kerry Burtnyk
- Third: Mark Olson
- Second: Jim Spencer
- Lead: Ron Kammerlock
- Finalist: Northern Ontario (Al Hackner)

The 1981 Labatt Brier, the Canadian men's curling championship was held from March 1 to 8, 1981 at the Halifax Metro Centre in Halifax, Nova Scotia. The total attendance for the week was 67,257.

Team Manitoba, who was skipped by Kerry Burtnyk won the Brier tankard as they defeated Northern Ontario, skipped by Al Hackner in the final 5–4. Manitoba advanced to the final after beating Saskatchewan in the semifinal 5–4. This was Manitoba's twenty-first Brier championship and the first of two skipped by Burtnyk. At 22 years, 3 months, and 15 days, Burtnyk became the youngest skip to ever win a Brier surpassing Hec Gervais' record by nearly five years when he won the 1961 Brier.

The Burtynk rink would go onto represent Canada in the 1981 Air Canada Silver Broom, the men's world curling championship on home soil in London, Ontario where they lost in the semifinal to eventual champion Switzerland.

The event set a record for the most extra end games in a single Brier as fourteen games went to an extra end breaking the record of eleven set in 1976. This remains a record and would only be matched in 1990.

== Teams ==
The teams were listed as follows:

Alberta	British Columbia	Manitoba
Fairview CC, Fairview Skip: Mel Watchorn; Third: Jim Fox; Second: Terry Watchorn; Lead: Merv Watchorn	Kamloops CC, Kamloops Skip: Barry McPhee; Third: Robert Kuroyama; Second: Brian Eden; Lead: Grant Young	Assiniboine Memorial CC, Winnipeg Skip: Kerry Burtnyk; Third: Mark Olson; Second: Jim Spencer; Lead: Ron Kammerlock
New Brunswick	Newfoundland	Northern Ontario
Beaver CC, Moncton Fourth: Tony Richardson; Third: Bruce Forster; Second: Gord Johnson; Skip: Don Mix	St. John's CC, St. John's Skip: Toby McDonald; Third: Jim Miller; Second: John Allan; Lead: Neil Young	Fort William CC, Thunder Bay Skip: Al Hackner; Third: Rick Lang; Second: Bob Nicol; Lead: Bruce Kennedy
Nova Scotia	Ontario	Prince Edward Island
Dartmouth CC, Dartmouth Skip: Alan Darragh; Third: Tom Fetterly; Second: Michael Currie; Lead: Brent Cotter	Avonlea CC, Don Mills Skip: Ed Werenich; Third: Bob Widdis; Second: Neil Harrison; Lead: Jim McGrath	Charlottetown CC, Charlottetown Skip: Peter MacDonald; Third: Bobby Carruthers; Second: Alexander Stewart; Lead: Rod MacDonald
Quebec	Saskatchewan	Yukon/Northwest Territories
Howick CC, Howick Skip: Brian Ness; Third: Karl Murovic; Second: Roy Weigand; Lead: Robert Carter	Assiniboia CC, Assiniboia Skip: Bob Ellert; Third: Don Bushell; Second: Ken Berner; Lead: Bill Wilson	Whitehorse CC, Whitehorse Skip: Chuck Haines; Third: Gordon Gee; Second: Lyle Sieg; Lead: John Russell

== Map of teams ==
Provincial Winners

== Round-robin standings ==
Final Round Robin standings

Key
Teams to Playoffs
Teams to Tiebreakers

Province	Skip	W	L	PF	PA	EW	EL	BE	SE	S%
Northern Ontario	Al Hackner	9	2	81	63	50	40	8	15	77%
Manitoba	Kerry Burtnyk	8	3	71	44	46	37	11	8	80%
Ontario	Ed Werenich	7	4	73	59	51	43	7	18	75%
Saskatchewan	Bob Ellert	7	4	66	58	45	40	8	10	73%
British Columbia	Barry McPhee	7	4	81	72	48	46	5	12	72%
Quebec	Brian Ness	6	5	61	58	45	39	9	14	75%
Alberta	Mel Watchorn	5	6	69	60	47	46	3	11	75%
Prince Edward Island	Peter MacDonald	4	7	56	69	41	47	13	9	71%
Yukon/Northwest Territories	Chuck Haines	4	7	50	71	37	50	8	4	70%
New Brunswick	Don Mix	3	8	53	69	39	50	13	2	71%
Newfoundland	Toby McDonald	3	8	55	70	41	45	11	11	73%
Nova Scotia	Alan Darragh	3	8	56	79	43	50	4	10	69%

== Round-robin results ==
All draw times are listed in Atlantic Standard Time (UTC-04:00).

=== Draw 1 ===
Sunday, March 1, 2:00 pm

Sheet A	1	2	3	4	5	6	7	8	9	10	Final
New Brunswick (Mix) 🔨	0	1	0	1	0	0	2	0	0	0	4
British Columbia (McPhee)	1	0	2	0	1	0	0	1	1	1	7

Sheet B	1	2	3	4	5	6	7	8	9	10	Final
Quebec (Ness) 🔨	0	1	0	0	1	0	0	1	0	1	4
Saskatchewan (Ellert)	0	0	0	1	0	1	0	0	1	0	3

Sheet C	1	2	3	4	5	6	7	8	9	10	Final
Newfoundland (McDonald) 🔨	0	0	1	0	1	0	2	0	0	X	4
Manitoba (Burtnyk)	2	0	0	2	0	2	0	0	3	X	9

Sheet D	1	2	3	4	5	6	7	8	9	10	Final
Ontario (Werenich) 🔨	0	0	1	1	0	0	1	1	0	X	4
Prince Edward Island (MacDonald)	3	1	0	0	0	2	0	0	1	X	7

Sheet E	1	2	3	4	5	6	7	8	9	10	Final
Northern Ontario (Hackner) 🔨	0	1	0	0	4	0	1	1	X	X	7
Yukon/Northwest Territories (Haines)	0	0	1	0	0	0	0	0	X	X	1

=== Draw 2 ===
Sunday, March 1, 8:00 pm

Sheet A	1	2	3	4	5	6	7	8	9	10	11	Final
Northern Ontario (Hackner) 🔨	1	0	1	0	2	0	1	0	1	0	1	7
Prince Edward Island (MacDonald)	0	0	0	1	0	1	0	1	0	3	0	6

Sheet B	1	2	3	4	5	6	7	8	9	10	Final
Manitoba (Burtnyk) 🔨	0	0	2	1	0	1	0	1	0	1	6
Ontario (Werenich)	0	1	0	0	1	0	2	0	1	0	5

Sheet C	1	2	3	4	5	6	7	8	9	10	11	Final
British Columbia (McPhee) 🔨	1	0	1	4	0	1	0	0	0	1	1	9
Yukon/Northwest Territories (Haines)	0	3	0	0	3	0	0	1	1	0	0	8

Sheet D	1	2	3	4	5	6	7	8	9	10	Final
New Brunswick (Mix) 🔨	1	0	0	0	0	2	0	0	2	X	5
Newfoundland (McDonald)	0	1	1	1	1	0	0	2	0	X	6

Sheet E	1	2	3	4	5	6	7	8	9	10	Final
Nova Scotia (Darragh) 🔨	1	0	1	0	2	0	0	1	0	X	5
Alberta (Watchorn)	0	1	0	1	0	2	0	0	3	X	7

=== Draw 3 ===
Monday, March 2, 9:30 am

Sheet C	1	2	3	4	5	6	7	8	9	10	Final
Manitoba (Burtnyk) 🔨	0	0	2	0	0	1	0	0	0	1	4
New Brunswick (Mix)	2	0	0	0	1	0	0	0	2	0	5

Sheet D	1	2	3	4	5	6	7	8	9	10	11	Final
Newfoundland (McDonald) 🔨	0	0	0	1	0	0	0	2	0	0	0	3
British Columbia (McPhee)	0	0	0	0	0	2	0	0	0	1	1	4

=== Draw 4 ===
Monday, March 2, 2:30 pm

Sheet A	1	2	3	4	5	6	7	8	9	10	Final
Newfoundland (McDonald) 🔨	1	0	0	1	0	2	0	0	1	0	5
Ontario (Werenich)	0	2	0	0	0	2	0	1	0	1	6

Sheet B	1	2	3	4	5	6	7	8	9	10	Final
Yukon/Northwest Territories (Haines) 🔨	1	0	0	1	0	2	0	1	0	1	6
Nova Scotia (Darragh)	0	1	1	0	1	0	1	0	0	0	4

Sheet C	1	2	3	4	5	6	7	8	9	10	Final
Prince Edward Island (MacDonald) 🔨	1	0	0	0	2	0	0	0	1	0	4
Saskatchewan (Ellert)	0	0	2	0	0	2	0	0	0	2	6

Sheet D	1	2	3	4	5	6	7	8	9	10	Final
Northern Ontario (Hackner) 🔨	2	1	0	0	1	0	0	3	0	1	8
Alberta (Watchorn)	0	0	1	0	0	2	1	0	1	0	5

Sheet E	1	2	3	4	5	6	7	8	9	10	Final
Manitoba (Burtnyk) 🔨	1	1	0	0	3	0	0	3	X	X	8
Quebec (Ness)	0	0	1	0	0	0	1	0	X	X	2

=== Draw 5 ===
Monday, March 2, 8:00 pm

Sheet A	1	2	3	4	5	6	7	8	9	10	Final
Saskatchewan (Ellert) 🔨	1	0	1	3	0	1	0	1	0	X	7
Yukon/Northwest Territories (Haines)	0	0	0	0	1	0	1	0	1	X	3

Sheet B	1	2	3	4	5	6	7	8	9	10	11	Final
Alberta (Watchorn) 🔨	0	0	2	0	1	0	0	1	1	0	0	5
Prince Edward Island (MacDonald)	1	1	0	0	0	1	0	0	0	2	1	6

Sheet C	1	2	3	4	5	6	7	8	9	10	Final
Nova Scotia (Darragh) 🔨	2	0	2	0	0	0	0	1	1	X	6
Northern Ontario (Hackner)	0	1	0	1	2	4	2	0	0	X	10

Sheet D	1	2	3	4	5	6	7	8	9	10	Final
British Columbia (McPhee) 🔨	0	0	2	0	2	2	0	2	0	1	9
Quebec (Ness)	2	1	0	2	0	0	2	0	1	0	8

Sheet E	1	2	3	4	5	6	7	8	9	10	Final
Ontario (Werenich) 🔨	0	0	1	0	3	0	1	1	0	1	7
New Brunswick (Mix)	0	2	0	1	0	2	0	0	0	0	5

=== Draw 6 ===
Tuesday, March 3, 9:30 am

Sheet B	1	2	3	4	5	6	7	8	9	10	11	Final
Ontario (Werenich) 🔨	0	0	0	2	0	4	0	1	0	0	0	7
Northern Ontario (Hackner)	2	0	1	0	2	0	0	0	2	0	1	8

Sheet C	1	2	3	4	5	6	7	8	9	10	Final
Yukon/Northwest Territories (Haines) 🔨	0	0	0	1	1	0	1	0	1	X	4
Prince Edward Island (MacDonald)	0	1	2	0	0	1	0	3	0	X	7

=== Draw 7 ===
Tuesday, March 3, 2:30 pm

Sheet A	1	2	3	4	5	6	7	8	9	10	Final
Manitoba (Burtnyk) 🔨	0	0	1	0	1	1	0	1	0	1	5
Alberta (Watchorn)	0	0	0	2	0	0	1	0	1	0	4

Sheet B	1	2	3	4	5	6	7	8	9	10	Final
Newfoundland (McDonald) 🔨	1	0	1	0	1	0	0	3	2	X	8
Yukon/Northwest Territories (Haines)	0	2	0	1	0	1	0	0	0	X	4

Sheet C	1	2	3	4	5	6	7	8	9	10	Final
Quebec (Ness) 🔨	0	2	3	0	0	1	0	0	0	1	7
Ontario (Werenich)	1	0	0	1	0	0	0	1	2	0	5

Sheet D	1	2	3	4	5	6	7	8	9	10	Final
Nova Scotia (Darragh) 🔨	0	1	1	0	0	2	0	2	1	0	7
New Brunswick (Mix)	1	0	0	2	2	0	2	0	0	2	9

Sheet E	1	2	3	4	5	6	7	8	9	10	Final
Saskatchewan (Ellert) 🔨	1	0	1	0	2	1	0	0	0	2	7
British Columbia (McPhee)	0	2	0	2	0	0	1	0	0	0	5

=== Draw 8 ===
Tuesday, March 3, 8:00 pm

Sheet A	1	2	3	4	5	6	7	8	9	10	Final
Quebec (Ness) 🔨	0	0	0	1	2	2	0	1	0	X	6
Nova Scotia (Darragh)	1	0	0	0	0	0	0	0	1	X	2

Sheet B	1	2	3	4	5	6	7	8	9	10	Final
British Columbia (McPhee) 🔨	0	1	0	0	2	0	0	2	0	X	5
Alberta (Watchorn)	3	0	1	2	0	1	1	0	2	X	10

Sheet C	1	2	3	4	5	6	7	8	9	10	Final
Saskatchewan (Ellert) 🔨	1	0	2	0	1	0	0	1	2	X	7
New Brunswick (Mix)	0	2	0	1	0	0	1	0	0	X	4

Sheet D	1	2	3	4	5	6	7	8	9	10	11	Final
Northern Ontario (Hackner) 🔨	0	1	0	0	2	0	1	0	0	1	1	6
Manitoba (Burtnyk)	1	0	0	1	0	1	0	2	0	0	0	5

Sheet E	1	2	3	4	5	6	7	8	9	10	Final
Newfoundland (McDonald) 🔨	0	0	1	1	1	0	0	0	0	X	3
Prince Edward Island (MacDonald)	2	1	0	0	0	0	0	1	2	X	6

=== Draw 9 ===
Wednesday, March 4, 9:30 am

Sheet C	1	2	3	4	5	6	7	8	9	10	Final
Quebec (Ness) 🔨	1	0	0	1	0	1	0	1	0	X	4
Alberta (Watchorn)	0	2	0	0	1	0	2	0	3	X	8

Sheet D	1	2	3	4	5	6	7	8	9	10	Final
Saskatchewan (Ellert) 🔨	0	1	0	1	0	0	1	2	0	3	8
Nova Scotia (Darragh)	1	0	1	0	1	0	0	0	3	0	6

=== Draw 10 ===
Wednesday, March 4, 2:30 pm

Sheet A	1	2	3	4	5	6	7	8	9	10	Final
British Columbia (McPhee) 🔨	1	0	3	0	4	0	3	0	0	0	11
Northern Ontario (Hackner)	0	2	0	2	0	2	0	3	0	1	10

Sheet B	1	2	3	4	5	6	7	8	9	10	Final
Prince Edward Island (MacDonald) 🔨	0	0	1	0	0	2	0	1	0	1	5
New Brunswick (Mix)	0	1	0	2	0	0	2	0	1	0	6

Sheet C	1	2	3	4	5	6	7	8	9	10	Final
Ontario (Werenich) 🔨	0	2	3	0	3	0	1	1	X	X	10
Nova Scotia (Darragh)	0	0	0	1	0	1	0	0	X	X	2

Sheet D	1	2	3	4	5	6	7	8	9	10	Final
Newfoundland (McDonald) 🔨	1	0	1	0	2	0	0	2	2	X	8
Alberta (Watchorn)	0	2	0	1	0	1	0	0	0	X	4

Sheet E	1	2	3	4	5	6	7	8	9	10	Final
Yukon/Northwest Territories (Haines) 🔨	0	0	0	1	0	0	1	0	1	X	3
Manitoba (Burtnyk)	0	3	0	0	0	2	0	1	0	X	6

=== Draw 11 ===
Wednesday, March 4, 8:00 pm

Sheet A	1	2	3	4	5	6	7	8	9	10	Final
Prince Edward Island (MacDonald) 🔨	0	1	0	0	1	0	0	1	0	X	3
Manitoba (Burtnyk)	1	0	0	4	0	1	0	0	2	X	8

Sheet B	1	2	3	4	5	6	7	8	9	10	Final
Saskatchewan (Ellert) 🔨	1	1	0	2	0	4	2	0	X	X	10
Newfoundland (McDonald)	0	0	1	0	1	0	0	1	X	X	3

Sheet C	1	2	3	4	5	6	7	8	9	10	Final
New Brunswick (Mix) 🔨	0	1	0	1	0	2	0	0	0	1	5
Yukon/Northwest Territories (Haines)	2	0	1	0	1	0	0	0	2	0	6

Sheet D	1	2	3	4	5	6	7	8	9	10	Final
Quebec (Ness) 🔨	0	2	0	1	0	1	0	0	1	0	5
Northern Ontario (Hackner)	0	0	1	0	1	0	0	2	0	2	6

Sheet E	1	2	3	4	5	6	7	8	9	10	Final
British Columbia (McPhee) 🔨	0	1	0	3	0	0	1	0	1	0	6
Ontario (Werenich)	0	0	1	0	2	1	0	1	0	2	7

=== Draw 12 ===
Thursday, March 5, 2:30 pm

Sheet A	1	2	3	4	5	6	7	8	9	10	11	Final
Ontario (Werenich) 🔨	0	1	0	2	0	0	0	1	1	0	1	6
Saskatchewan (Ellert)	1	0	1	0	1	0	1	0	0	1	0	5

Sheet B	1	2	3	4	5	6	7	8	9	10	Final
Nova Scotia (Darragh) 🔨	0	0	0	1	0	2	0	0	0	X	3
British Columbia (McPhee)	1	1	1	0	2	0	0	2	4	X	11

Sheet C	1	2	3	4	5	6	7	8	9	10	Final
Prince Edward Island (MacDonald) 🔨	0	0	0	1	1	0	0	0	1	X	3
Quebec (Ness)	0	1	2	0	0	2	2	1	0	X	8

Sheet D	1	2	3	4	5	6	7	8	9	10	Final
Alberta (Watchorn) 🔨	0	2	0	1	0	1	0	1	0	X	5
Yukon/Northwest Territories (Haines)	2	0	2	0	1	0	1	0	1	X	7

Sheet E	1	2	3	4	5	6	7	8	9	10	Final
New Brunswick (Mix) 🔨	0	0	0	1	0	1	0	1	1	X	4
Northern Ontario (Hackner)	0	0	2	0	2	0	2	0	0	X	6

=== Draw 13 ===
Thursday, March 5, 8:00 pm

Sheet A	1	2	3	4	5	6	7	8	9	10	Final
Yukon/Northwest Territories (Haines) 🔨	0	2	0	0	1	0	0	2	0	X	5
Quebec (Ness)	0	0	1	1	0	1	0	0	1	X	4

Sheet B	1	2	3	4	5	6	7	8	9	10	Final
Northern Ontario (Hackner) 🔨	2	0	0	1	1	0	2	2	0	X	8
Newfoundland (McDonald)	0	1	2	0	0	1	0	0	1	X	5

Sheet C	1	2	3	4	5	6	7	8	9	10	11	Final
Alberta (Watchorn) 🔨	0	1	0	0	1	0	1	0	1	1	0	5
Ontario (Werenich)	1	0	0	1	0	2	0	1	0	0	1	6

Sheet D	1	2	3	4	5	6	7	8	9	10	Final
Manitoba (Burtnyk) 🔨	3	0	2	3	0	1	0	1	X	X	10
Saskatchewan (Ellert)	0	0	0	0	1	0	1	0	X	X	2

Sheet E	1	2	3	4	5	6	7	8	9	10	Final
Prince Edward Island (MacDonald) 🔨	0	0	0	1	0	1	0	1	0	X	3
Nova Scotia (Darragh)	1	1	2	0	1	0	1	0	3	X	9

=== Draw 14 ===
Friday, March 6, 9:30 am

Sheet A	1	2	3	4	5	6	7	8	9	10	Final
Alberta (Watchorn) 🔨	2	2	0	1	1	1	0	1	X	X	8
New Brunswick (Mix)	0	0	1	0	0	0	1	0	X	X	2

Sheet B	1	2	3	4	5	6	7	8	9	10	Final
Nova Scotia (Darragh) 🔨	1	0	1	0	0	0	2	0	0	1	5
Manitoba (Burtnyk)	0	1	0	0	0	1	0	1	1	0	4

Sheet C	1	2	3	4	5	6	7	8	9	10	Final
Northern Ontario (Hackner) 🔨	0	1	0	0	0	0	3	0	1	0	5
Saskatchewan (Ellert)	2	0	0	1	0	0	0	1	0	4	8

Sheet D	1	2	3	4	5	6	7	8	9	10	Final
Prince Edward Island (MacDonald) 🔨	1	0	0	2	0	0	2	0	1	X	6
British Columbia (McPhee)	0	1	0	0	4	1	0	3	0	X	9

Sheet E	1	2	3	4	5	6	7	8	9	10	Final
Quebec (Ness) 🔨	1	0	1	0	1	1	0	3	0	X	7
Newfoundland (McDonald)	0	0	0	1	0	0	2	0	1	X	4

=== Draw 15 ===
Friday, March 6, 2:30 pm

Sheet A	1	2	3	4	5	6	7	8	9	10	11	Final
Nova Scotia (Darragh) 🔨	1	0	1	0	0	1	0	1	0	2	1	7
Newfoundland (McDonald)	0	2	0	2	1	0	0	0	1	0	0	6

Sheet B	1	2	3	4	5	6	7	8	9	10	11	Final
New Brunswick (Mix) 🔨	0	1	0	0	0	2	0	1	0	1	0	5
Quebec (Ness)	0	0	0	3	0	0	1	0	1	0	1	6

Sheet C	1	2	3	4	5	6	7	8	9	10	11	Final
Manitoba (Burtnyk) 🔨	2	0	1	0	1	0	0	1	0	0	1	6
British Columbia (McPhee)	0	2	0	1	0	1	0	0	0	1	0	5

Sheet D	1	2	3	4	5	6	7	8	9	10	Final
Yukon/Northwest Territories (Haines) 🔨	0	0	0	0	0	1	0	2	0	X	3
Ontario (Werenich)	1	1	1	3	1	0	1	0	1	X	9

Sheet E	1	2	3	4	5	6	7	8	9	10	Final
Alberta (Watchorn) 🔨	0	4	0	2	0	1	1	0	X	X	8
Saskatchewan (Ellert)	1	0	0	0	1	0	0	1	X	X	3

== Tiebreakers ==
Ontario was awarded the bye into the second tiebreaker round based on head-to-head victories over both British Columbia and Saskatchewan in the round robin.

			To Semifinal
			1	Ontario	5
2	Saskatchewan	7		Saskatchewan	6
3	British Columbia	5

=== Round 1 ===
Friday, March 6, 8:00 pm

Sheet C	1	2	3	4	5	6	7	8	9	10	Final
Saskatchewan (Ellert) 🔨	1	0	1	0	0	4	0	0	0	1	7
British Columbia (McPhee)	0	1	0	2	0	0	2	0	0	0	5

Player percentages
Saskatchewan		British Columbia	
Bill Wilson	83%	Grant Young	84%
Ken Berner	74%	Brian Eden	81%
Don Bushell	68%	Robert Kuroyama	76%
Bob Ellert	74%	Barry McPhee	66%
Total	74%	Total	77%

=== Round 2 ===
Saturday, March 7, 9:30 am

Sheet C	1	2	3	4	5	6	7	8	9	10	11	Final
Ontario (Werenich) 🔨	0	1	0	1	0	1	0	1	0	1	0	5
Saskatchewan (Ellert)	0	0	1	0	2	0	2	0	0	0	1	6

Player percentages
Ontario		Saskatchewan	
Jim McGrath	89%	Bill Wilson	55%
Neil Harrison	90%	Ken Berner	80%
Bob Widdis	77%	Don Bushell	70%
Ed Werenich	66%	Bob Ellert	85%
Total	80%	Total	72%

== Playoffs ==
Semifinal			Final
			1	Northern Ontario	4
2	Manitoba	5	2	Manitoba	5
3	Saskatchewan	4

=== Semifinal ===
Saturday, March 7, 3:30 pm

Sheet C	1	2	3	4	5	6	7	8	9	10	11	Final
Manitoba (Burtnyk) 🔨	0	2	0	0	0	0	1	0	1	0	1	5
Saskatchewan (Ellert)	1	0	0	0	1	0	0	1	0	1	0	4

Player percentages
Manitoba		Saskatchewan	
Ron Kammerlock	90%	Bill Wilson	82%
Jim Spencer	83%	Ken Berner	81%
Mark Olson	90%	Don Bushell	74%
Kerry Burtnyk	76%	Bob Ellert	73%
Total	85%	Total	77%

=== Final ===
Sunday, March 8, 3:00 pm

Sheet C	1	2	3	4	5	6	7	8	9	10	Final
Northern Ontario (Hackner)	0	0	0	2	1	0	1	0	0	0	4
Manitoba (Burtnyk) 🔨	0	0	1	0	0	1	0	0	0	3	5

Player percentages
Northern Ontario		Manitoba	
Bruce Kennedy	84%	Ron Kammerlock	83%
Bob Nicol	76%	Jim Spencer	80%
Rick Lang	74%	Mark Olson	75%
Al Hackner	84%	Kerry Burtnyk	78%
Total	79%	Total	79%

== Statistics ==
=== Top 5 player percentages ===
Final Round Robin Percentages

Key
All-Star Team

Leads	%
(Manitoba) Ron Kammerlock	81
(Ontario) Jim McGrath	80
(Northern Ontario) Bruce Kennedy	79
(Newfoundland and Labrador) Neil Young	77
(Prince Edward Island) Rod MacDonald	76

Seconds	%
(Quebec) Roy Weigand	79
(Manitoba) Jim Spencer	78
(Northern Ontario) Bob Nicol	76
(Alberta) Terry Watchorn	75
(Saskatchewan) Ken Berner	75

Thirds	%
(Manitoba) Mark Olson	81
(Northern Ontario) Rick Lang	76
(Newfoundland and Labrador) Jim Miller	75
(British Columbia) Jim Fox	75
(Quebec) Karl Murovic	75

Skips	%
(Manitoba) Kerry Burtnyk	78
(Northern Ontario) Al Hackner	77
(Alberta) Mel Watchorn	74
(British Columbia) Barry McPhee	73
(Ontario) Ed Werenich	73

== Awards ==
=== All-Star Team ===
The media selected the following curlers as All-Stars.

Position	Name	Team
Skip	Al Hackner	Northern Ontario
Third	Mark Olson	Manitoba
Second	Roy Weigand	Quebec
Lead	Jim McGrath	Ontario

=== Ross G.L. Harstone Award ===
The Ross Harstone Award was presented to the player chosen by their fellow peers as the curler who best represented Harstone's high ideals of good sportsmanship, observance of the rules, exemplary conduct and curling ability.

Alberta skip, Mel Watchorn became the first player to win the Harstone Award twice after previously winning the award in 1973.

Name	Team	Position
Mel Watchorn (2)	Alberta	Skip
