= Crealock =

Crealock is a surname. Notable people with the surname include:

- Frank Crealock (1925–2016), American curler
- Henry Hope Crealock (1831–1891), British soldier, artist, and author
- W. I. B. Crealock (1920–2009), yacht designer and author
