= Stan Austman =

Canadian curler

Stanley Joseph Austman (August 20, 1936 – January 21, 2012) was a Canadian curler from Saskatoon, Saskatchewan.

Austman was born in Kenaston, Saskatchewan. In his youth, Austman played in the Bayne Secord rink that won two straight (1954 & 1955) Canadian High School Boys Championships, the forerunner of the Canadian Junior Curling Championships. He won Canadian University titles in 1956 and 1957. It was at the 1954 High School championship that Austman slid all the way down the ice with the stone, depositing the rock on the button. The following year, the Dominion Curling Association changed the rules of the game, to prevent curlers from releasing the rock before the near hogline.

The pinnacle of Austman's career came in 1985 when he was the fifth man and coach of the Eugene Hritzuk rink at the 1985 Labatt Brier. Austman would play in just five ends in the team's win over Nova Scotia after their regular second, Nick Paulsen developed stomach cramps.

Austman was inducted into the Saskatchewan Sports Hall of Fame in 1995.

Outside of curling, Austman spent 40 years as a farmer, but also worked as an inspector, taxi driver, substitute teacher, addiction counsellor and curling instructor.

He died of cancer at St. Paul's Hospital in Saskatoon.
