= Stirrat =

Stirrat may refer to:

- Anthony Stirrat (born 1970), Scottish former international cyclist
- Bob Stirrat, Scottish curler
- Garth Stirrat (born 1956), New Zealand cricket umpire
- Stirrat Johnson-Marshall (1912-1981), British architect
- Stirrat, West Virginia

== See also ==
- Stirratt (disambiguation)
