= Ron Anton =

Canadian curler (1941–2023)

- Curler ♂
- Born: Ronald Michael (Mathias) Anton; August 7, 1941; Medicine Hat, Alberta, Canada
- Died: November 11, 2023 (aged 82); Chilliwack, British Columbia, Canada

Curling career
- Brier: 3 (1961, 1962, 1974)
- World Championship: 1 (1974)
Medal record
Macdonald Brier
Representing Alberta
Gold medal – first place	1961 Calgary
Gold medal – first place	1974 London
Silver medal – second place	1962 Kitchener

Ronald Michael (Mathias) Anton (August 7, 1941 – November 11, 2023) was a Canadian curler, originally from Medicine Hat, Alberta. He played as third on the Hec Gervais rink that won the 1961 Brier and 1974 Brier. He was the first curler to use a slider on his heel when delivering the stone.

After winning the 1961 Brier, Anton passed on the opportunity to represent Canada at the 1961 Scotch Cup, the World Men's Curling Championship in order to study for exams. After the team won the 1974 Brier, Anton did play in the Air Canada Silver Broom (that year's World Championship) though, finishing in fourth place for Canada.

In 1975 he was inducted into Canadian Curling Hall of Fame.

Anton also coached the 1967 Canadian Schoolboy Championship team. He also coached the Cathy Shaw team at the 1982 Scott Tournament of Hearts.

== Personal life and death ==
Anton was the son of Matt and Annie.

At the time of the 1961 Brier, he was a 19 year-old student at the University of Alberta. He later became an educator in Edmonton, Alberta, first as a high school teacher, and then as a principal.

Anton was married to Corinne McCabe and had four children. Anton and McCabe moved to Chilliwack, British Columbia in 2007. He died in Chilliwack on November 11, 2023, at the age of 82.
