= Wally Ursuliak =

Canadian curler (1929–2025)

- Curler
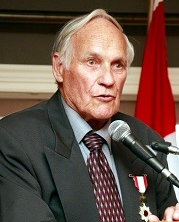
- Born: June 30, 1929; Canada
- Died: March 7, 2025 (aged 95); Canada

Team
- Curling club: Alberta Avenue CC; Edmonton, AB
- Skip: Hec Gervais
- Third: Ray Werner
- Second: Vic Raymer
- Lead: Wally Ursuliak

Curling career
- Brier: 2 (1961, 1962)
- World Championship: 1 (1961)
Medal record
Representing Canada
Men's curling
World Championships
Gold medal – first place	1961 Scotland	Team
Representing Alberta
Macdonald Brier
Gold medal – first place	1961 Calgary
Silver medal – second place	1962 Kitchener

Wally Ursuliak (June 30, 1929 – March 7, 2025) was a Canadian curler from Morinville, Alberta.

== Biography ==
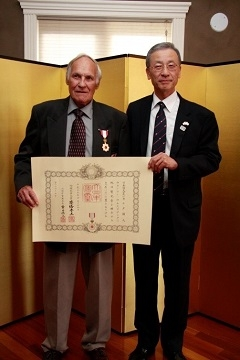
Ursuliak was given the Order of the Rising Sun, Gold and Silver Rays from Kunihiko Tanabe, Consul-General of Japan in Calgary, on 15 June 2017.

Ursuliak began curling at the age of 23 at the Alberta Avenue Curling Club.

He was the lead on the Alberta Avenue CC curling team (from Edmonton, Alberta, Canada) during the World Curling Championships known as the 1961 Scotch Cup. He was inducted into the Canadian Curling Hall of Fame in 2006.

Ursuliak quit competitive curling in 1969 due to a shoulder injury. He was a member of the first ever umpire crew at a Brier in 1973, where he wore a sweater with one white arm, and one red arm which were used to indicate shot rock after a measurement.

During the 1960s and 1970s, he along with Ray Turnbull and Don Duguid operated a series of curling clinics in Europe to try to popularize the game. In 1980s, he was also credited with introducing the game to the Japanese island of Hokkaido.

Despite his work as a curling instructor around the world, Curling Canada prevented him from coaching a junior curling team in 1987 as he did not have his level three coaching certificate.

In addition to his work as a curling instructor, Ursuliak worked as the general sales manager of Ailsa Craig Curling Stones, a job he took in 1976.

== Personal life and death ==
Ursuliak had three children and was married to Sandy. Ursuliak died in Canada on March 7, 2025, at the age of 95.
