= 1985 Labatt Brier =

- Host city: Moncton, New Brunswick
- Arena: Moncton Coliseum
- Dates: March 3–10
- Attendance: 65,475
- Winner: Northern Ontario
- Curling club: Fort William CC, Thunder Bay
- Skip: Al Hackner
- Third: Rick Lang
- Second: Ian Tetley
- Lead: Pat Perroud
- Alternate: Bruce Kennedy
- Finalist: Alberta (Pat Ryan)

The 1985 Labatt Brier, the Canadian national men's curling championship was held from March 3 to 10 at the Moncton Coliseum in Moncton, New Brunswick. A total of 65,475 people attended the event. As of 2025, this is the most recent Brier that New Brunswick has hosted.

Team Northern Ontario, skipped by Al Hackner defeated Alberta's Pat Ryan to win his second Brier title.

== Teams ==
The tams were listed as follows:

Alberta	British Columbia	Manitoba
Ottewell CC, Edmonton Skip: Pat Ryan; Third: Gord Trenchie; Second: Don McKenzie; Lead: Don Walchuk; Alternate: Don Bartlett	Vancouver CC, Vancouver Skip: Paul Devlin; Third: Doug Meger; Second: Ken Watson; Lead: Dale Reibin; Alternate: Jim Topley	Wildewood CC, Winnipeg Skip: John Bubbs; Third: Dave Iverson; Second: Cliff Lenz; Lead: Dan Hildebrand; Alternate: Derek Devlin
New Brunswick	Newfoundland	Northern Ontario
Beaver CC, Moncton Skip: Bryan Wight (Note: Team New Brunswick alternate Gary Mitchell threw skip stones in Draw 15.); Third: Bob Carruthers; Second: Serge Denis; Lead: Cy Sutherland; Alternate: Gary Mitchell	St. John's CC, St. John's Skip: Jeff Thomas; Third: Geoff Cunningham; Second: John Allan; Lead: Neil Young; Alternate: Ken Thomas	Fort William CC, Thunder Bay Skip: Al Hackner; Third: Rick Lang; Second: Ian Tetley; Lead: Pat Perroud; Alternate: Bruce Kennedy
Nova Scotia	Ontario	Prince Edward Island
Dartmouth CC, Dartmouth Skip: Tom Hakansson; Third: Peter MacPhee; Second: Stuart MacLean; Lead: Dave Wallace; Alternate: Bruce Walker	Royal Canadian Navy CC, Ottawa Skip: Earle Morris; Third: Lovel Lord; Second: Dave Merklinger; Lead: Bill Fletcher (Note: Team Ontario alternate Jerry Ciasnocha threw lead stones in the last end of Draw 14.); Alternate: Jerry Ciasnocha	Charlottetown CC, Charlottetown Skip: Wayne Matheson; Third: Doug Weeks; Second: John Likely; Lead: Billy Dillon; Alternate: Ted MacFadyen
Quebec	Saskatchewan	Northwest Territories/Yukon
Lachine CC, Montreal Skip: Don Aitken; Third: Robbie MacLean; Second: Andrew Carter; Lead: Dan Belliveau; Alternate: Hugh Bray	Nutana CC, Saskatoon Skip: Eugene Hritzuk; Third: Bob Miller; Second: Nick Paulsen (Note: Team Saskatchewan alternate Stan Austman threw second stones for the last five ends of Draw 2 after second Nick Paulsen left the game due to an upset stomach.); Lead: Art Paulsen; Alternate: Stan Austman	Yellowknife CC, Yellowknife Skip: Al Delmage; Third: Roy Giles; Second: Bill Strain; Lead: Ron Kapicki; Alternate: Glenn Jackson

== Map of teams ==
Provincial Winners

== Round Robin standings ==
Final Round Robin standings

Key
Teams to Playoffs
Teams to Tiebreaker

Locale	Skip	W	L	W–L	PF	PA	EW	EL	BE	SE	S%
Alberta	Pat Ryan	11	0	–	82	43	46	33	9	10	80%
Northern Ontario	Al Hackner	7	4	–	68	54	45	39	10	13	81%
Quebec	Don Aitken	6	5	2–1; 1–0	71	64	46	42	9	15	74%
Prince Edward Island	Wayne Matheson	6	5	2–1; 0–1	61	77	44	50	4	9	73%
Saskatchewan	Eugene Hritzuk	6	5	1–2; 1–0	66	59	41	40	15	6	78%
Northwest Territories/Yukon	Al Delmage	6	5	1–2; 0–1	68	67	47	43	4	15	74%
Manitoba	John Bubbs	5	6	3–0	78	66	42	45	7	11	79%
Nova Scotia	Tom Hakansson	5	6	2–1	63	64	44	44	8	9	74%
British Columbia	Paul Devlin	5	6	1–2	66	70	44	46	3	8	73%
Ontario	Earle Morris	5	6	0–3	69	76	43	48	5	10	81%
New Brunswick	Bryan Wight	3	8	–	57	75	42	45	6	10	69%
Newfoundland	Jeff Thomas	1	10	–	56	90	42	51	6	8	71%

== Round Robin results ==
All draw times are listed in Atlantic Time (UTC-04:00).

=== Draw 1 ===
Sunday, March 3, 2:00 pm

Sheet A	1	2	3	4	5	6	7	8	9	10	Final
Quebec (Aitken)	0	1	0	0	1	1	0	0	X	X	3
Manitoba (Bubbs) 🔨	2	0	3	2	0	0	1	1	X	X	9

Sheet B	1	2	3	4	5	6	7	8	9	10	Final
New Brunswick (Wight)	0	2	2	0	2	1	2	0	1	X	10
Newfoundland (Thomas) 🔨	3	0	0	2	0	0	0	1	0	X	6

Sheet C	1	2	3	4	5	6	7	8	9	10	Final
Ontario (Morris) 🔨	1	0	3	0	1	0	0	1	0	2	8
Northern Ontario (Hackner)	0	1	0	1	0	1	1	0	2	0	6

Sheet D	1	2	3	4	5	6	7	8	9	10	Final
Prince Edward Island (Matheson)	0	1	0	1	0	2	1	0	0	1	6
British Columbia (Devlin) 🔨	2	0	1	0	1	0	0	1	0	0	5

Sheet E	1	2	3	4	5	6	7	8	9	10	Final
Northwest Territories/Yukon (Delmage)	0	0	1	0	0	0	1	0	0	X	2
Alberta (Ryan) 🔨	2	0	0	2	1	2	0	0	2	X	9

=== Draw 2 ===
Sunday, March 3, 7:30 pm

Sheet A	1	2	3	4	5	6	7	8	9	10	Final
Northwest Territories/Yukon (Delmage)	0	2	0	0	2	0	1	0	2	X	7
British Columbia (Devlin) 🔨	1	0	1	0	0	1	0	1	0	X	4

Sheet B	1	2	3	4	5	6	7	8	9	10	Final
Northern Ontario (Hackner)	1	0	2	1	1	1	0	3	X	X	9
Prince Edward Island (Matheson) 🔨	0	1	0	0	0	0	1	0	X	X	2

Sheet C	1	2	3	4	5	6	7	8	9	10	Final
Manitoba (Bubbs)	0	0	1	0	2	0	3	0	2	X	8
Alberta (Ryan) 🔨	3	0	0	2	0	3	0	2	0	X	10

Sheet D	1	2	3	4	5	6	7	8	9	10	Final
Quebec (Aitken)	1	0	0	1	0	0	3	1	1	X	7
Ontario (Morris) 🔨	0	2	0	0	1	1	0	0	0	X	4

Sheet E	1	2	3	4	5	6	7	8	9	10	Final
Nova Scotia (Hakansson)	0	2	0	0	0	1	0	0	0	X	3
Saskatchewan (Hritzuk) 🔨	2	0	1	0	0	0	2	1	0	X	6

=== Draw 3 ===
Monday, March 4, 9:00 am

Sheet C	1	2	3	4	5	6	7	8	9	10	Final
Northern Ontario (Hackner) 🔨	2	1	0	0	0	4	0	0	0	X	7
Quebec (Aitken)	0	0	1	1	1	0	0	1	0	X	4

Sheet D	1	2	3	4	5	6	7	8	9	10	Final
Ontario (Morris) 🔨	0	1	2	0	0	0	2	0	1	X	6
Manitoba (Bubbs)	1	0	0	2	3	1	0	2	0	X	9

=== Draw 4 ===
Monday, March 4, 1:30 pm

Sheet A	1	2	3	4	5	6	7	8	9	10	Final
Ontario (Morris) 🔨	1	0	0	0	3	0	1	1	0	2	8
Prince Edward Island (Matheson)	0	1	3	0	0	2	0	0	1	0	7

Sheet B	1	2	3	4	5	6	7	8	9	10	Final
Alberta (Ryan)	0	1	0	1	1	0	2	0	1	X	6
Nova Scotia (Hakansson) 🔨	2	0	0	0	0	1	0	1	0	X	4

Sheet C	1	2	3	4	5	6	7	8	9	10	Final
British Columbia (Devlin) 🔨	1	0	2	0	1	0	0	3	1	X	8
Newfoundland (Thomas)	0	2	0	1	0	0	2	0	0	X	5

Sheet D	1	2	3	4	5	6	7	8	9	10	Final
Northwest Territories/Yukon (Delmage) 🔨	0	1	0	0	2	0	0	1	0	X	4
Saskatchewan (Hritzuk)	2	0	0	2	0	0	2	0	1	X	7

Sheet E	1	2	3	4	5	6	7	8	9	10	Final
Northern Ontario (Hackner)	0	0	0	1	0	1	0	0	1	X	3
New Brunswick (Wight) 🔨	1	1	0	0	2	0	3	0	0	X	7

=== Draw 5 ===
Monday, March 4, 7:30 pm

Sheet A	1	2	3	4	5	6	7	8	9	10	Final
Newfoundland (Thomas) 🔨	1	0	0	2	0	0	1	0	2	0	6
Alberta (Ryan)	0	1	1	0	0	3	0	2	0	4	11

Sheet B	1	2	3	4	5	6	7	8	9	10	Final
Saskatchewan (Hritzuk)	1	0	0	0	1	0	1	0	0	0	3
British Columbia (Devlin) 🔨	0	1	0	1	0	2	0	1	0	2	7

Sheet C	1	2	3	4	5	6	7	8	9	10	Final
Nova Scotia (Hakansson)	0	0	3	0	0	1	1	0	1	X	6
Northwest Territories/Yukon (Delmage)	1	1	0	1	3	0	0	3	0	X	9

Sheet D	1	2	3	4	5	6	7	8	9	10	Final
Manitoba (Bubbs)	0	0	0	0	1	0	0	3	0	0	4
New Brunswick (Wight) 🔨	1	0	2	1	0	1	0	0	0	0	5

Sheet E	1	2	3	4	5	6	7	8	9	10	Final
Prince Edward Island (Matheson) 🔨	0	1	0	1	0	0	0	1	X	X	3
Quebec (Aitken)	0	0	1	0	4	1	2	0	X	X	8

=== Draw 6 ===
Tuesday, March 5, 9:00 am

Sheet B	1	2	3	4	5	6	7	8	9	10	Final
Prince Edward Island (Matheson)	0	2	1	0	1	0	0	1	1	1	7
Northwest Territories/Yukon (Delmage) 🔨	1	0	0	2	0	1	1	0	0	0	5

Sheet C	1	2	3	4	5	6	7	8	9	10	Final
Alberta (Ryan) 🔨	0	0	0	2	1	0	2	0	0	X	5
British Columbia (Devlin)	0	0	1	0	0	2	0	1	0	X	4

=== Draw 7 ===
Tuesday, March 5, 1:30 pm

Sheet A	1	2	3	4	5	6	7	8	9	10	Final
Northern Ontario (Hackner) 🔨	3	0	0	2	0	0	1	0	1	X	7
Saskatchewan (Hritzuk)	0	0	1	0	1	0	0	0	0	X	2

Sheet B	1	2	3	4	5	6	7	8	9	10	Final
Ontario (Morris) 🔨	0	1	0	0	1	0	0	X	X	X	2
Alberta (Ryan)	0	0	3	0	0	3	2	X	X	X	8

Sheet C	1	2	3	4	5	6	7	8	9	10	11	Final
New Brunswick (Wight) 🔨	2	0	1	0	2	0	1	1	0	1	0	8
Prince Edward Island (Matheson)	0	2	0	2	0	2	0	0	2	0	1	9

Sheet D	1	2	3	4	5	6	7	8	9	10	Final
Nova Scotia (Hakansson)	0	0	1	0	0	1	0	2	0	X	4
Quebec (Aitken) 🔨	2	1	0	2	1	0	1	0	0	X	7

Sheet E	1	2	3	4	5	6	7	8	9	10	Final
Newfoundland (Thomas) 🔨	0	1	1	0	0	0	2	1	0	2	7
Manitoba (Bubbs)	1	0	0	0	3	0	0	0	2	0	6

=== Draw 8 ===
Tuesday, March 5, 7:30 pm

Sheet A	1	2	3	4	5	6	7	8	9	10	Final
New Brunswick (Wight)	0	0	0	1	0	1	1	0	1	0	4
Nova Scotia (Hakansson) 🔨	1	0	1	0	2	0	0	1	0	1	6

Sheet B	1	2	3	4	5	6	7	8	9	10	11	Final
Manitoba (Bubbs)	0	1	0	0	4	0	1	0	3	0	0	9
Saskatchewan (Hritzuk) 🔨	1	0	1	1	0	1	0	3	0	2	2	11

Sheet C	1	2	3	4	5	6	7	8	9	10	Final
Newfoundland (Thomas) 🔨	1	0	1	1	0	2	0	1	0	0	6
Quebec (Aitken)	0	0	0	0	3	0	3	0	2	1	9

Sheet D	1	2	3	4	5	6	7	8	9	10	Final
Northwest Territories/Yukon (Delmage)	0	0	1	0	1	0	2	0	2	0	6
Northern Ontario (Hackner) 🔨	0	1	0	3	0	1	0	2	0	3	10

Sheet E	1	2	3	4	5	6	7	8	9	10	Final
Ontario (Morris)	0	1	0	0	1	0	1	0	2	X	5
British Columbia (Devlin) 🔨	0	0	1	2	0	3	0	2	0	X	8

=== Draw 9 ===
Wednesday, March 6, 9:00 am

Sheet C	1	2	3	4	5	6	7	8	9	10	Final
New Brunswick (Wight)	0	0	0	1	0	1	0	X	X	X	2
Saskatchewan (Hritzuk) 🔨	0	2	2	0	3	0	5	X	X	X	12

Sheet D	1	2	3	4	5	6	7	8	9	10	Final
Newfoundland (Thomas) 🔨	1	0	0	1	0	0	1	0	X	X	3
Nova Scotia (Hakansson)	0	5	1	0	0	3	0	1	X	X	10

=== Draw 10 ===
Wednesday, March 6, 1:30 pm

Sheet A	1	2	3	4	5	6	7	8	9	10	Final
Manitoba (Bubbs) 🔨	0	0	2	0	1	0	0	2	0	X	5
Northwest Territories/Yukon (Delmage)	1	2	0	2	0	1	1	0	2	X	9

Sheet B	1	2	3	4	5	6	7	8	9	10	Final
British Columbia (Devlin)	0	2	0	2	0	4	0	1	0	1	10
Quebec (Aitken) 🔨	3	0	1	0	1	0	2	0	2	0	9

Sheet C	1	2	3	4	5	6	7	8	9	10	Final
Prince Edward Island (Matheson)	0	1	0	2	0	0	2	1	0	X	6
Nova Scotia (Hakansson) 🔨	2	0	1	0	0	1	0	0	1	X	5

Sheet D	1	2	3	4	5	6	7	8	9	10	Final
Ontario (Morris)	0	2	0	0	1	0	1	0	0	X	4
Saskatchewan (Hritzuk) 🔨	1	0	0	2	0	2	0	0	2	X	7

Sheet E	1	2	3	4	5	6	7	8	9	10	Final
Alberta (Ryan) 🔨	2	0	0	2	0	1	0	0	0	X	5
Northern Ontario (Hackner)	0	0	1	0	1	0	1	0	0	X	3

=== Draw 11 ===
Wednesday, March 6, 7:30 pm

Sheet A	1	2	3	4	5	6	7	8	9	10	Final
British Columbia (Devlin) 🔨	1	0	1	1	0	0	2	0	1	X	6
Northern Ontario (Hackner)	0	3	0	0	2	1	0	2	0	X	8

Sheet B	1	2	3	4	5	6	7	8	9	10	Final
Newfoundland (Thomas)	0	1	0	1	0	1	0	1	1	X	5
Ontario (Morris) 🔨	2	0	3	0	2	0	1	0	0	X	8

Sheet C	1	2	3	4	5	6	7	8	9	10	11	Final
Quebec (Aitken) 🔨	1	0	0	1	0	1	0	0	0	2	0	5
Alberta (Ryan)	0	2	0	0	2	0	0	1	0	0	1	6

Sheet D	1	2	3	4	5	6	7	8	9	10	Final
New Brunswick (Wight) 🔨	0	1	0	0	0	1	0	0	2	0	4
Northwest Territories/Yukon (Delmage)	2	0	0	1	0	0	2	0	0	1	6

Sheet E	1	2	3	4	5	6	7	8	9	10	Final
Manitoba (Bubbs) 🔨	1	4	1	0	1	0	0	X	X	X	7
Prince Edward Island (Matheson)	0	0	0	1	0	1	0	X	X	X	2

=== Draw 12 ===
Thursday, March 7, 1:30 pm

Sheet A	1	2	3	4	5	6	7	8	9	10	11	Final
Prince Edward Island (Matheson) 🔨	1	0	0	0	2	1	2	0	2	0	2	10
Newfoundland (Thomas)	0	2	2	1	0	0	0	1	0	2	0	8

Sheet B	1	2	3	4	5	6	7	8	9	10	Final
Nova Scotia (Hakansson)	0	1	0	1	0	0	1	0	0	X	3
Manitoba (Bubbs) 🔨	2	0	2	0	0	1	0	1	0	X	6

Sheet C	1	2	3	4	5	6	7	8	9	10	Final
British Columbia (Devlin)	3	0	1	0	0	0	1	0	0	1	6
New Brunswick (Wight) 🔨	0	2	0	0	1	0	0	1	1	0	5

Sheet D	1	2	3	4	5	6	7	8	9	10	Final
Saskatchewan (Hritzuk)	0	1	0	0	0	1	0	1	0	X	3
Alberta (Ryan) 🔨	1	0	1	0	0	0	2	0	2	X	6

Sheet E	1	2	3	4	5	6	7	8	9	10	Final
Quebec (Aitken)	0	0	1	0	0	0	0	3	1	X	5
Northwest Territories/Yukon (Delmage) 🔨	3	1	0	1	1	0	1	0	0	X	7

=== Draw 13 ===
Thursday, March 7, 7:30 pm

Sheet A	1	2	3	4	5	6	7	8	9	10	Final
Alberta (Ryan) 🔨	1	0	1	2	0	2	1	0	1	X	8
New Brunswick (Wight)	0	1	0	0	1	0	0	2	0	X	4

Sheet B	1	2	3	4	5	6	7	8	9	10	Final
Northwest Territories/Yukon (Delmage)	0	1	0	0	2	1	0	0	2	1	7
Ontario (Morris) 🔨	0	0	3	1	0	0	2	2	0	0	8

Sheet C	1	2	3	4	5	6	7	8	9	10	Final
Saskatchewan (Hritzuk) 🔨	0	2	0	0	2	0	1	0	1	0	6
Prince Edward Island (Matheson)	2	0	0	1	0	1	0	2	0	1	7

Sheet D	1	2	3	4	5	6	7	8	9	10	11	Final
Northern Ontario (Hackner)	1	0	1	1	0	0	1	0	0	0	1	5
Newfoundland (Thomas) 🔨	0	2	0	0	1	0	0	0	0	1	0	4

Sheet E	1	2	3	4	5	6	7	8	9	10	Final
British Columbia (Devlin)	0	0	0	0	3	1	0	0	0	1	5
Nova Scotia (Hakansson) 🔨	1	1	1	0	0	0	1	1	1	0	6

=== Draw 14 ===
Friday, March 8, 9:00 am

Sheet A	1	2	3	4	5	6	7	8	9	10	Final
Saskatchewan (Hritzuk) 🔨	0	0	0	0	1	0	0	0	1	0	2
Quebec (Aitken)	0	0	0	1	0	0	1	1	0	3	6

Sheet B	1	2	3	4	5	6	7	8	9	10	Final
Nova Scotia (Hakansson) 🔨	1	0	0	0	0	1	0	3	1	X	6
Northern Ontario (Hackner)	0	0	0	2	0	0	1	0	0	X	3

Sheet C	1	2	3	4	5	6	7	8	9	10	Final
Northwest Territories/Yukon (Delmage) 🔨	1	0	0	1	1	2	0	0	1	X	6
Newfoundland (Thomas)	0	1	0	0	0	0	0	1	0	X	2

Sheet D	1	2	3	4	5	6	7	8	9	10	Final
British Columbia (Devlin) 🔨	0	2	0	0	0	1	0	0	X	X	3
Manitoba (Bubbs)	1	0	4	1	2	0	0	3	X	X	11

Sheet E	1	2	3	4	5	6	7	8	9	10	Final
New Brunswick (Wight) 🔨	0	0	1	0	0	1	0	X	X	X	2
Ontario (Morris)	2	1	0	0	2	2	0	X	X	X	7

=== Draw 15 ===
Friday, March 8, 1:30 pm

Sheet A	1	2	3	4	5	6	7	8	9	10	11	Final
Nova Scotia (Hakansson) 🔨	2	0	4	0	0	1	1	0	1	0	1	10
Ontario (Morris)	0	3	0	2	2	0	0	1	0	1	0	9

Sheet B	1	2	3	4	5	6	7	8	9	10	Final
Quebec (Aitken) 🔨	1	0	0	0	1	2	0	1	0	3	8
New Brunswick (Wight)	0	1	2	0	0	0	2	0	1	0	6

Sheet C	1	2	3	4	5	6	7	8	9	10	Final
Northern Ontario (Hackner)	1	1	2	0	2	0	0	1	0	X	7
Manitoba (Bubbs) 🔨	0	0	0	2	0	1	0	0	1	X	4

Sheet D	1	2	3	4	5	6	7	8	9	10	Final
Alberta (Ryan) 🔨	1	0	0	0	2	2	0	3	X	X	8
Prince Edward Island (Matheson)	0	0	1	0	0	0	1	0	X	X	2

Sheet E	1	2	3	4	5	6	7	8	9	10	Final
Saskatchewan (Hritzuk) 🔨	1	0	0	0	1	0	3	0	0	2	7
Newfoundland (Thomas)	0	1	1	0	0	1	0	0	1	0	4

== Tiebreakers ==
First Round
Quebec	6
Northwest Territories/Yukon	5
Prince Edward Island	1
Saskatchewan	8

To Playoffs
Quebec	4
Saskatchewan	8

=== First Round ===
Friday, March 8, 7:30 pm

Sheet D	1	2	3	4	5	6	7	8	9	10	Final
Quebec (Aitken)	0	1	0	1	0	3	0	1	0	X	6
Northwest Territories/Yukon (Delmage) 🔨	1	0	0	0	1	0	2	0	1	X	5

Player percentages
Quebec		Northwest Territories/Yukon	
Dan Belliveau	72%	Ron Kapicki	88%
Andrew Carter	71%	Bill Strain	81%
Robbie MacLean	74%	Roy Giles	61%
Don Aitken	79%	Al Delmage	60%
Total	74%	Total	73%

Sheet B	1	2	3	4	5	6	7	8	9	10	Final
Prince Edward Island (MacFadyen) 🔨	0	0	1	0	0	0	0	X	X	X	1
Saskatchewan (Hritzuk)	0	2	0	2	1	2	1	X	X	X	8

Player percentages
Prince Edward Island		Saskatchewan	
Billy Dillon	61%	Art Paulsen	83%
John Likely	79%	Nick Paulsen	64%
Doug Weeks	82%	Bob Miller	96%
Wayne Matheson	38%	Eugene Hritzuk	91%
Total	65%	Total	84%

=== Second Round ===
Saturday, March 9, 9:00 am

Team	1	2	3	4	5	6	7	8	9	10	Final
Quebec (Aitken)	0	2	0	0	0	1	0	1	0	X	4
Saskatchewan (Hritzuk) 🔨	2	0	0	3	1	0	2	0	0	X	8

Player percentages
Quebec		Saskatchewan	
Dan Belliveau	88%	Art Paulsen	77%
Andrew Carter	82%	Nick Paulsen	82%
Robbie MacLean	69%	Bob Miller	83%
Don Aitken	61%	Eugene Hritzuk	79%
Total	75%	Total	81%

== Playoffs ==
Semifinal			Final
			1	Alberta	5
2	Northern Ontario	7	2	Northern Ontario	6
3	Saskatchewan	4

=== Semifinal ===
Saturday, March 9, 1:00 pm

Sheet C	1	2	3	4	5	6	7	8	9	10	Final
Northern Ontario (Hackner) 🔨	1	0	0	1	0	1	0	0	2	2	7
Saskatchewan (Hritzuk)	0	0	1	0	1	0	2	0	0	0	4

Player percentages
Northern Ontario		Saskatchewan	
Pat Perroud	88%	Art Paulsen	78%
Ian Tetley	80%	Nick Paulsen	69%
Rick Lang	70%	Bob Miller	83%
Al Hackner	80%	Eugene Hritzuk	78%
Total	79%	Total	77%

=== Final ===
Sunday, March 10, 1:00 pm

Sheet C	1	2	3	4	5	6	7	8	9	10	11	Final
Alberta (Ryan) 🔨	1	0	2	0	0	1	0	0	1	0	0	5
Northern Ontario (Hackner)	0	1	0	1	0	0	0	1	0	2	1	6

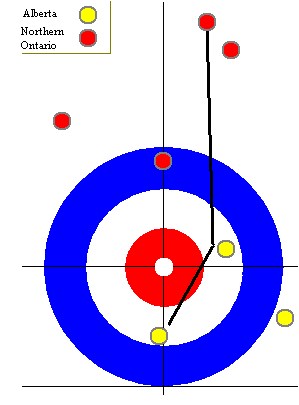
The "Hackner double", an in-off double takeout considered one of the greatest shots in curling.

Player percentages
Alberta		Northern Ontario	
Don Walchuk	86%	Pat Perroud	100%
Don McKenzie	81%	Ian Tetley	94%
Gord Trenchie	82%	Rick Lang	82%
Pat Ryan	89%	Al Hackner	82%
Total	84%	Total	90%

==== The Hackner double ====
Hackner found himself in a two-point deficit coming into the tenth end, and he was forced to make a very tough double takeout and stick his shooter in order to tie the game. The shot allowed him to steal a point in the extra end when Ryan was heavy with his last stone.

== Statistics ==
=== Top 5 player percentages ===
Round Robin only

Key
First All-Star Team
Second All-Star Team

Leads	%
(Ontario) Bill Fletcher	86
(Northern Ontario) Pat Perroud	82
(Prince Edward Island) Billy Dillon	80
(Saskatchewan) Art Paulsen	79
(Manitoba) Dan Hildebrand	79

Seconds	%
(Ontario) Dave Merklinger	83
(Northern Ontario) Ian Tetley	81
(Alberta) Don McKenzie	81
(Manitoba) Cliff Lenz	80
(Saskatchewan) Nick Paulsen	80

Thirds	%
(Manitoba) Dave Iverson	80
(Northern Ontario) Rick Lang	80
(Ontario) Lovel Lord	80
(Alberta) Gord Trenchie	77
(British Columbia) Doug Meger	76
(Nova Scotia) Peter MacPhee	76

Skips	%
(Alberta) Pat Ryan	84
(Northern Ontario) Al Hackner	81
(Saskatchewan) Eugene Hritzuk	77
(Quebec) Don Aitken	75
(Manitoba) John Bubbs	75

== Awards ==
The all-star teams and award winners are as follows:

=== All Star Teams ===
First Team
Position	Name	Team
Skip	Pat Ryan	Alberta
Third	Dave Iverson	Manitoba
Second	Don McKenzie	Alberta
Lead	Bill Fletcher	Ontario

Second Team
Position	Name	Team
Skip	Don Aitken	Quebec
Third	Rick Lang	Northern Ontario
Second	Ian Tetley	Northern Ontario
Lead	Don Walchuk	Alberta

=== Ross Harstone Award ===
The Ross Harstone Award is presented to the player chosen by their fellow peers as the curler who best represented Harstone's high ideals of good sportsmanship, observance of the rules, exemplary conduct and curling ability.

Name	Position	Team
Dan Hildebrand	Lead	Manitoba
