= John Jamieson (curler) =

Canadian-American curler

- Curler
- Born: February 14, 1925; Winnipeg, Manitoba, Canada
- Died: November 10, 2001 (aged 76)

Team
- Curling club: Granite CC
- Skip: Frank Crealock
- Third: Ken Sherwood
- Second: John Jamieson
- Lead: Bud McCartney
Medal record
Representing the United States
Men's Curling
World Championships
Bronze medal – third place	1961 Scotland	Team
US Men's Championship
Gold medal – first place	1961 Grand Forks

John Gardner Jamieson (February 14, 1925 – November 10, 2001) was a Canadian-American curler from Lynden, Washington. He was the second on the Granite Curling Club team (from Seattle, Washington, United States) during the World Curling Championships known as the 1961 Scotch Cup, where they won the bronze medal.

Jamieson grew up in Winnipeg and Victoria Beach, Manitoba. He served as a seaman with the Royal Canadian Navy in World War II. After exiting the Navy, he would work as an inspector with a phone company. In 1957, he moved to Everett, Washington to work for the West Coast Telephone Company. He then worked for Boeing before becoming the owner of the Riverside Tavern in Everett. After that, he became the owner of Wallace Poultry in Bellingham, Washington.
