= 1988 Labatt Brier =

- Host city: Chicoutimi, Quebec
- Arena: Centre Georges-Vézina
- Dates: March 6–13
- Attendance: 45,220
- Winner: Alberta
- Curling club: Ottewell CC, Edmonton
- Skip: Pat Ryan
- Third: Randy Ferbey
- Second: Don Walchuk
- Lead: Don McKenzie
- Alternate: Roy Hebert
- Finalist: Saskatchewan (Eugene Hritzuk)

The 1988 Labatt Brier was held from March 6 to 13 at the Centre Georges-Vézina in Chicoutimi, Quebec.

Pat Ryan of Alberta finished the round robin with an undefeated record and went on to defeat Eugene Hritzuk of Saskatchewan in the final to clinch his first Brier title.

== Teams ==
Alberta	British Columbia	Manitoba
Ottewell CC, Edmonton Skip: Pat Ryan; Third: Randy Ferbey; Second: Don Walchuk; Lead: Don McKenzie; Alternate: Roy Hebert	Vancouver CC, Vancouver Skip: Ron Thompson; Third: Glen Hillson; Second: Graeme Franklin; Lead: Rob Robinson; Alternate: Joel Berglund	Assiniboine Memorial CC, Winnipeg Skip: Kerry Burtnyk; Third: Jim Spencer; Second: Ron Kammerlock; Lead: Don Harvey; Alternate: Jeff Ryan
New Brunswick	Newfoundland	Northern Ontario
Newcastle CC, Newcastle Skip: Steve Adams; Third: Ward McDonald; Second: Greg Gallivan; Lead: Roger Gallant; Alternate: Dodie Dickison	Recplex, Corner Brook Skip: Gary Oke; Third: Ken Thomas; Second: Marc Brophy; Lead: Gerry Collins; Alternate: Fred Schulstad	Fort William CC, Thunder Bay Skip: Al Hackner; Third: Rick Lang; Second: Jim Adams; Lead: Doug Smith; Alternate: Bill Adams
Nova Scotia	Ontario	Prince Edward Island
Dartmouth CC, Dartmouth Skip: Thomas Hakansson; Third: Stuart MacLean; Second: Bill Robinson; Lead: Dave Wallace; Alternate: Peter MacPhee	Avonlea CC, Toronto Skip: Paul Savage; Third: Ed Werenich; Second: Graeme McCarrel; Lead: Neil Harrison; Alternate: John Kawaja	Crapaud CC, Summerside Skip: David MacFadyen; Third: Frank MacDonald; Second: Neil MacFadyen; Lead: Aidan Sheridan; Alternate: Ted MacFadyen
Quebec	Saskatchewan	Northwest Territories/Yukon
Lachine CC, Lachine Skip: Lawren Steventon; Third: Pete Gawel; Second: Marco Ferraro; Lead: Dean Gemmell; Alternate: Malcolm Turner	Nutana CC, Saskatoon Skip: Eugene Hritzuk; Third: Del Shaughnessy; Second: Murray Soparlo; Lead: Don Dabrowski; Alternate: Ron Mills	Yellowknife CC, Yellowknife Skip: Trevor Alexander; Third: Richard Robertson; Second: Brad Robertson; Lead: Clayton Ravndal; Alternate: John Moss

== Map of teams ==
Provincial Winners

== Round-robin standings ==
Key
Teams to Playoffs

Province	Skip	W	L	Shot %
Alberta	Pat Ryan	11	0	85
Saskatchewan	Eugene Hritzuk	8	3	81
Ontario	Paul Savage	8	3	81
Manitoba	Kerry Burtnyk	7	4	82
Nova Scotia	Thomas Hakansson	7	4	79
British Columbia	Ron Thompson	6	5	82
Northern Ontario	Al Hackner	5	6	82
Quebec	Lawren Steventon	4	7	75
Newfoundland	Gary Oke	4	7	79
New Brunswick	Steve Adams	3	8	73
Prince Edward Island	David MacFadyen	2	9	70
Northwest Territories/Yukon	Trevor Alexander	1	10	73

== Round-robin results ==
=== Draw 1 ===
Sheet A	1	2	3	4	5	6	7	8	9	10	Final
British Columbia (Thompson)	0	0	1	0	1	0	0	1	0	X	3
Saskatchewan (Hritzuk) 🔨	0	1	0	1	0	1	2	0	2	X	7

Sheet B	1	2	3	4	5	6	7	8	9	10	Final
Prince Edward Island (MacFadyen) 🔨	0	1	0	0	1	0	2	0	1	X	5
Newfoundland (Oke)	0	0	2	1	0	1	0	2	0	X	6

Sheet C	1	2	3	4	5	6	7	8	9	10	Final
New Brunswick (Adams) 🔨	0	0	1	0	0	0	2	0	0	X	3
Alberta (Ryan)	2	1	0	2	0	1	0	0	2	X	8

Sheet D	1	2	3	4	5	6	7	8	9	10	Final
Manitoba (Burtnyk) 🔨	0	0	1	1	0	1	0	0	0	X	3
Ontario (Savage)	1	1	0	0	1	0	1	1	1	X	6

Sheet E	1	2	3	4	5	6	7	8	9	10	Final
Northwest Territories/Yukon (Alexander) 🔨	0	0	0	3	1	0	0	1	0	X	5
Northern Ontario (Hackner)	1	2	0	0	0	3	2	0	0	X	8

=== Draw 2 ===
Sheet A	1	2	3	4	5	6	7	8	9	10	Final
Northwest Territories/Yukon (Alexander) 🔨	0	0	0	2	0	3	0	1	X	X	6
Ontario (Savage)	0	1	2	0	2	0	4	0	X	X	9

Sheet B	1	2	3	4	5	6	7	8	9	10	Final
Alberta (Ryan) 🔨	0	2	0	0	1	0	2	0	0	X	5
Manitoba (Burtnyk)	0	0	0	1	0	1	0	0	1	X	3

Sheet C	1	2	3	4	5	6	7	8	9	10	11	Final
Saskatchewan (Hritzuk) 🔨	0	0	1	0	0	1	0	0	0	0	3	5
Northern Ontario (Hackner)	0	0	0	0	1	0	1	0	0	0	0	2

Sheet D	1	2	3	4	5	6	7	8	9	10	11	Final
British Columbia (Thompson)	0	2	2	0	0	0	1	0	2	0	1	8
New Brunswick (Adams) 🔨	1	0	0	1	1	1	0	2	0	1	0	7

Sheet E	1	2	3	4	5	6	7	8	9	10	Final
Quebec (Steventon) 🔨	1	0	1	1	0	2	0	0	X	X	5
Nova Scotia (Hakansson)	0	1	0	0	2	0	2	3	X	X	8

=== Draw 3 ===
Sheet C	1	2	3	4	5	6	7	8	9	10	Final
Alberta (Ryan)	0	0	2	0	2	0	2	0	0	1	7
British Columbia (Thompson) 🔨	2	0	0	1	0	2	0	1	0	0	6

Sheet D	1	2	3	4	5	6	7	8	9	10	11	Final
New Brunswick (Adams)	0	1	0	0	0	1	0	0	0	1	0	3
Saskatchewan (Hritzuk) 🔨	1	0	1	0	1	0	0	0	0	0	1	4

=== Draw 4 ===
Sheet A	1	2	3	4	5	6	7	8	9	10	Final
New Brunswick (Adams)	0	0	2	0	0	0	X	X	X	X	2
Manitoba (Burtnyk) 🔨	1	2	0	2	2	1	X	X	X	X	8

Sheet B	1	2	3	4	5	6	7	8	9	10	Final
Northern Ontario (Hackner)	0	0	1	1	1	1	0	4	X	X	8
Quebec (Steventon) 🔨	1	0	0	0	0	0	2	0	X	X	3

Sheet C	1	2	3	4	5	6	7	8	9	10	Final
Ontario (Savage)	0	1	1	1	0	0	2	0	0	X	5
Newfoundland (Oke) 🔨	0	0	0	0	0	1	0	0	1	X	2

Sheet D	1	2	3	4	5	6	7	8	9	10	Final
Northwest Territories/Yukon (Alexander)	2	0	0	2	0	0	1	0	0	X	5
Nova Scotia (Hakansson) 🔨	0	1	1	0	1	1	0	2	1	X	7

Sheet E	1	2	3	4	5	6	7	8	9	10	Final
Alberta (Ryan)	0	1	0	0	2	0	1	0	0	2	6
Prince Edward Island (MacFadyen) 🔨	0	0	1	0	0	0	0	2	0	0	3

=== Draw 5 ===
Sheet A	1	2	3	4	5	6	7	8	9	10	11	Final
Newfoundland (Oke) 🔨	0	1	0	0	1	0	0	2	0	2	0	6
Northern Ontario (Hackner)	0	0	0	2	0	0	2	0	2	0	1	7

Sheet B	1	2	3	4	5	6	7	8	9	10	Final
Nova Scotia (Hakansson) 🔨	1	0	0	1	0	0	1	0	0	X	3
Ontario (Savage)	0	1	2	0	1	0	0	0	2	X	6

Sheet C	1	2	3	4	5	6	7	8	9	10	Final
Quebec (Steventon) 🔨	0	0	1	0	1	0	2	0	2	1	7
Northwest Territories/Yukon (Alexander)	2	0	0	0	0	2	0	1	0	0	5

Sheet D	1	2	3	4	5	6	7	8	9	10	Final
Saskatchewan (Hritzuk)	0	4	0	1	1	0	3	0	2	X	11
Prince Edward Island (MacFadyen) 🔨	4	0	0	0	0	1	0	1	0	X	6

Sheet E	1	2	3	4	5	6	7	8	9	10	Final
Manitoba (Burtnyk)	0	1	0	1	0	0	0	2	0	1	5
British Columbia (Thompson) 🔨	0	0	0	0	1	0	0	0	2	0	3

=== Draw 6 ===
Sheet B	1	2	3	4	5	6	7	8	9	10	Final
Manitoba (Burtnyk)	1	0	0	3	0	1	0	0	0	0	5
Northwest Territories/Yukon (Alexander) 🔨	0	1	0	0	1	0	0	1	0	1	4

Sheet C	1	2	3	4	5	6	7	8	9	10	Final
Northern Ontario (Hackner)	0	2	0	2	0	0	1	0	3	0	8
Ontario (Savage) 🔨	2	0	1	0	0	1	0	3	0	4	11

=== Draw 7 ===
Sheet A	1	2	3	4	5	6	7	8	9	10	Final
Alberta (Ryan)	0	2	0	0	2	1	1	1	0	2	9
Nova Scotia (Hakansson) 🔨	2	0	3	1	0	0	0	0	2	0	8

Sheet B	1	2	3	4	5	6	7	8	9	10	Final
New Brunswick (Adams) 🔨	1	1	1	0	2	0	0	1	0	2	8
Northern Ontario (Hackner)	0	0	0	3	0	1	2	0	1	0	7

Sheet C	1	2	3	4	5	6	7	8	9	10	Final
Prince Edward Island (MacFadyen)	0	1	0	0	0	2	0	0	1	X	4
Manitoba (Burtnyk) 🔨	2	0	2	1	0	0	2	0	0	X	7

Sheet D	1	2	3	4	5	6	7	8	9	10	11	Final
Quebec (Steventon)	0	1	0	2	0	1	0	1	0	1	0	6
British Columbia (Thompson) 🔨	1	0	2	0	2	0	1	0	0	0	1	7

Sheet E	1	2	3	4	5	6	7	8	9	10	Final
Newfoundland (Oke)	2	1	0	0	1	0	0	0	2	X	6
Saskatchewan (Hritzuk) 🔨	0	0	1	0	0	2	1	0	0	X	4

=== Draw 8 ===
Sheet A	1	2	3	4	5	6	7	8	9	10	Final
Prince Edward Island (MacFadyen)	1	0	0	0	1	0	0	1	1	0	4
Quebec (Steventon) 🔨	0	1	0	1	0	2	1	0	0	1	6

Sheet B	1	2	3	4	5	6	7	8	9	10	Final
Saskatchewan (Hritzuk)	0	1	0	1	0	1	0	0	1	X	4
Nova Scotia (Hakansson) 🔨	1	0	2	0	1	0	0	1	0	X	5

Sheet C	1	2	3	4	5	6	7	8	9	10	11	Final
Newfoundland (Oke)	0	0	0	0	0	1	0	0	0	2	0	3
British Columbia (Thompson) 🔨	0	0	1	0	0	0	1	1	0	0	1	4

Sheet D	1	2	3	4	5	6	7	8	9	10	11	Final
Northwest Territories/Yukon (Alexander)	0	1	0	1	0	1	0	1	0	1	0	5
Alberta (Ryan) 🔨	1	0	1	0	0	0	1	0	2	0	1	6

Sheet E	1	2	3	4	5	6	7	8	9	10	Final
New Brunswick (Adams)	0	0	3	0	0	0	1	1	0	X	5
Ontario (Savage) 🔨	3	2	0	0	1	1	0	0	2	X	9

=== Draw 9 ===
Sheet C	1	2	3	4	5	6	7	8	9	10	Final
Prince Edward Island (MacFadyen)	0	1	0	1	1	0	2	0	0	X	5
Nova Scotia (Hakansson) 🔨	1	0	1	0	0	3	0	2	0	X	7

Sheet D	1	2	3	4	5	6	7	8	9	10	Final
Newfoundland (Oke)	0	0	1	0	3	0	1	0	1	1	7
Quebec (Steventon) 🔨	1	1	0	3	0	2	0	1	0	0	8

=== Draw 10 ===
Sheet A	1	2	3	4	5	6	7	8	9	10	Final
Saskatchewan (Hritzuk)	1	0	0	1	0	0	2	2	X	X	6
Northwest Territories/Yukon (Alexander) 🔨	0	1	0	0	0	1	0	0	X	X	2

Sheet B	1	2	3	4	5	6	7	8	9	10	Final
Ontario (Savage)	0	4	0	0	0	2	0	2	0	1	9
British Columbia (Thompson) 🔨	1	0	2	1	1	0	2	0	1	0	8

Sheet C	1	2	3	4	5	6	7	8	9	10	Final
Manitoba (Burtnyk) 🔨	4	0	0	4	0	0	X	X	X	X	8
Quebec (Steventon)	0	1	0	0	1	0	X	X	X	X	2

Sheet D	1	2	3	4	5	6	7	8	9	10	Final
New Brunswick (Adams) 🔨	1	2	0	2	0	1	2	0	1	X	9
Nova Scotia (Hakansson)	0	0	1	0	2	0	0	1	0	X	4

Sheet E	1	2	3	4	5	6	7	8	9	10	Final
Northern Ontario (Hackner)	0	0	1	1	0	2	0	0	0	X	4
Alberta (Ryan) 🔨	0	2	0	0	2	0	0	2	2	X	8

=== Draw 11 ===
Sheet A	1	2	3	4	5	6	7	8	9	10	Final
Ontario (Savage) 🔨	0	1	0	0	0	0	1	0	0	0	2
Alberta (Ryan)	0	0	0	0	2	1	0	0	0	0	3

Sheet B	1	2	3	4	5	6	7	8	9	10	Final
Newfoundland (Oke)	0	1	1	1	0	0	2	0	0	X	5
New Brunswick (Adams) 🔨	0	0	0	0	2	0	0	0	0	X	2

Sheet C	1	2	3	4	5	6	7	8	9	10	Final
British Columbia (Thompson)	0	0	0	0	2	0	0	0	3	2	7
Northern Ontario (Hackner) 🔨	0	1	0	0	0	0	2	1	0	0	4

Sheet D	1	2	3	4	5	6	7	8	9	10	Final
Prince Edward Island (MacFadyen)	0	0	1	0	0	2	0	0	1	X	4
Northwest Territories/Yukon (Alexander) 🔨	2	1	0	1	1	0	0	1	0	X	6

Sheet E	1	2	3	4	5	6	7	8	9	10	Final
Saskatchewan (Hritzuk) 🔨	0	0	0	2	0	0	1	0	1	1	5
Manitoba (Burtnyk)	0	0	0	0	0	1	0	1	0	0	2

=== Draw 12 ===
Sheet A	1	2	3	4	5	6	7	8	9	10	11	Final
Manitoba (Burtnyk)	0	0	0	2	0	0	1	0	0	1	1	5
Newfoundland (Oke) 🔨	0	2	0	0	2	0	0	0	0	0	0	4

Sheet B	1	2	3	4	5	6	7	8	9	10	Final
Quebec (Steventon) 🔨	1	0	0	1	0	2	0	1	2	0	7
Saskatchewan (Hritzuk)	0	0	1	0	2	0	4	0	0	1	8

Sheet C	1	2	3	4	5	6	7	8	9	10	Final
Ontario (Savage)	0	0	2	2	1	0	1	0	1	0	7
Prince Edward Island (MacFadyen) 🔨	3	1	0	0	0	1	0	2	0	3	10

Sheet D	1	2	3	4	5	6	7	8	9	10	Final
Nova Scotia (Hakansson) 🔨	0	3	1	0	2	0	2	0	X	X	8
Northern Ontario (Hackner)	0	0	0	2	0	2	0	0	X	X	4

Sheet E	1	2	3	4	5	6	7	8	9	10	Final
British Columbia (Thompson) 🔨	0	2	0	0	1	0	2	1	0	X	6
Northwest Territories/Yukon (Alexander)	0	0	2	0	0	1	0	0	1	X	4

=== Draw 13 ===
Sheet A	1	2	3	4	5	6	7	8	9	10	Final
Northern Ontario (Hackner) 🔨	0	0	4	2	2	1	X	X	X	X	9
Prince Edward Island (MacFadyen)	0	1	0	0	0	0	X	X	X	X	1

Sheet B	1	2	3	4	5	6	7	8	9	10	Final
Northwest Territories/Yukon (Alexander)	0	0	3	0	1	0	0	X	X	X	4
New Brunswick (Adams) 🔨	2	1	0	5	0	2	1	X	X	X	11

Sheet C	1	2	3	4	5	6	7	8	9	10	Final
Nova Scotia (Hakansson)	0	0	0	1	0	1	1	0	0	0	3
Manitoba (Burtnyk) 🔨	0	2	0	0	1	0	0	0	0	1	4

Sheet D	1	2	3	4	5	6	7	8	9	10	Final
Alberta (Ryan) 🔨	1	1	0	1	0	2	0	0	0	1	6
Newfoundland (Oke)	0	0	2	0	1	0	2	0	0	0	5

Sheet E	1	2	3	4	5	6	7	8	9	10	Final
Ontario (Savage)	0	0	3	1	0	3	1	X	X	X	8
Quebec (Steventon) 🔨	0	1	0	0	1	0	0	X	X	X	2

=== Draw 14 ===
Sheet A	1	2	3	4	5	6	7	8	9	10	Final
Nova Scotia (Hakansson)	0	1	1	1	0	0	2	0	0	0	5
British Columbia (Thompson) 🔨	1	0	0	0	1	0	0	0	2	0	4

Sheet B	1	2	3	4	5	6	7	8	9	10	Final
Quebec (Steventon) 🔨	0	1	0	1	0	0	1	1	0	0	4
Alberta (Ryan)	2	0	1	0	1	1	0	0	0	1	6

Sheet C	1	2	3	4	5	6	7	8	9	10	11	Final
Northwest Territories/Yukon (Alexander) 🔨	0	0	0	1	0	3	0	2	1	1	0	8
Newfoundland (Oke)	0	1	1	0	3	0	3	0	0	0	1	9

Sheet D	1	2	3	4	5	6	7	8	9	10	Final
Ontario (Savage)	0	0	0	0	1	0	0	2	1	1	5
Saskatchewan (Hritzuk) 🔨	0	3	0	1	0	1	1	0	0	0	6

Sheet E	1	2	3	4	5	6	7	8	9	10	11	Final
Prince Edward Island (MacFadyen)	0	1	0	1	0	0	4	0	0	0	1	7
New Brunswick (Adams) 🔨	0	0	1	0	1	1	0	2	0	1	0	6

=== Draw 15 ===
Sheet A	1	2	3	4	5	6	7	8	9	10	Final
Quebec (Steventon)	0	1	1	0	1	1	0	1	1	X	6
New Brunswick (Adams) 🔨	0	0	0	2	0	0	2	0	0	X	4

Sheet B	1	2	3	4	5	6	7	8	9	10	Final
British Columbia (Thompson)	2	4	3	0	1	X	X	X	X	X	10
Prince Edward Island (MacFadyen) 🔨	0	0	0	1	0	X	X	X	X	X	1

Sheet C	1	2	3	4	5	6	7	8	9	10	Final
Alberta (Ryan) 🔨	0	0	2	0	2	0	2	0	3	X	9
Saskatchewan (Hritzuk)	1	1	0	1	0	2	0	1	0	X	6

Sheet D	1	2	3	4	5	6	7	8	9	10	Final
Northern Ontario (Hackner) 🔨	3	0	0	1	1	1	0	0	0	X	6
Manitoba (Burtnyk)	0	1	1	0	0	0	0	0	2	X	4

Sheet E	1	2	3	4	5	6	7	8	9	10	Final
Nova Scotia (Hakansson)	0	0	0	0	1	0	2	2	3	X	8
Newfoundland (Oke) 🔨	0	0	0	1	0	1	0	0	0	X	2

== Playoffs ==
Semifinal			Final
			1	Alberta	8
2	Saskatchewan	6	2	Saskatchewan	7
3	Ontario	1

=== Semifinal ===
Sheet C	1	2	3	4	5	6	7	8	9	10	Final
Saskatchewan (Hritzuk)	2	0	1	1	0	0	1	1	X	X	6
Ontario (Savage)	0	1	0	0	0	0	0	0	X	X	1

Player percentages
Saskatchewan		Ontario	
Don Dabrowski	78%	Neil Harrison	100%
Murray Soparlo	64%	Graeme McCarrel	93%
Del Shaughnessy	82%	Ed Werenich	79%
Eugene Hritzuk	90%	Paul Savage	67%
Total	78%	Total	85%

=== Final ===
Sheet C	1	2	3	4	5	6	7	8	9	10	Final
Alberta (Ryan) 🔨	1	0	1	0	0	2	0	1	0	3	8
Saskatchewan (Hritzuk)	0	2	0	0	1	0	2	0	2	0	7

Player percentages
Alberta		Saskatchewan	
Don McKenzie	94%	Don Dabrowski	91%
Don Walchuk	88%	Murray Soparlo	83%
Randy Ferbey	80%	Del Shaughnessy	79%
Pat Ryan	70%	Eugene Hritzuk	84%
Total	83%	Total	84%

== Statistics ==
=== Top 5 player percentages ===
Round Robin only

Leads	%
(Manitoba) Don Harvey	88
(Northern Ontario) Doug Smith	87
(Ontario) Neil Harrison	85
(British Columbia) Rob Robinson	84
(Alberta) Don McKenzie	84

Seconds	%
(Alberta) Don Walchuk	87
(Ontario) Graeme McCarrel	83
(Manitoba) Ron Kammerlock	82
(British Columbia) Graeme Franklin	82
(Saskatchewan) Murray Soparlo	80

Thirds	%
(Alberta) Randy Ferbey	85
(Northern Ontario) Rick Lang	83
(British Columbia) Glen Hillson	83
(Newfoundland and Labrador) Ken Thomas	81
(Manitoba) Jim Spencer	80

Skips	%
(Alberta) Pat Ryan	85
(Saskatchewan) Eugene Hritzuk	82
(Northern Ontario) Al Hackner	80
(Nova Scotia) Thomas Hakansson	79
(Manitoba) Kerry Burtnyk	79

=== Team percentages ===
Round Robin only

Province	Skip	%
Alberta	Pat Ryan	85
Manitoba	Kerry Burtnyk	82
Northern Ontario	Al Hackner	82
British Columbia	Ron Thompson	82
Ontario	Paul Savage	81
Saskatchewan	Eugene Hritzuk	81
Nova Scotia	Thomas Hakansson	79
Newfoundland	Gary Oke	79
Quebec	Lawren Steventon	75
Northwest Territories/Yukon	Trevor Alexander	73
New Brunswick	Steve Adams	73
Prince Edward Island	David MacFadyen	70
