= Mark Olson (curler) =

Canadian curler (born 1957)

- Curler ♂
- Born: August 13, 1957 (age 69)

Team
- Curling club: Assiniboine Memorial CC, Winnipeg, MB

Curling career
- Member Association: Manitoba
- Brier: 1: (1981)
- World Championship: 1 (1981)
Medal record
Curling
Representing Canada
World Championships
Bronze medal – third place	1981 London
Labatt Brier
Representing Manitoba
Gold medal – first place	1981 Halifax

Mark Olson (born August 13, 1957) is a Canadian curler. He is a 1981 World Men's bronze medallist and a 1981 Brier champion.

He is an international level coach and a past-president of the Manitoba Curling Tour and member of the Manitoba Curling Hall of Fame.

== Awards ==
- Collie Campbell Memorial Award: 1981
- Manitoba Curling Hall of Fame: 2008 (with all 1981 Canadian Men's Championship Team skipped by Kerry Burtnyk)

== Teams ==
Season	Skip	Third	Second	Lead	Events
1980–81	Kerry Burtnyk	Mark Olson	Jim Spencer	Ron Kammerlock	Brier 1981 (gold); WCC 1981 (bronze)
1992–93	John Bubbs	Mark Olson	Daryl Currie	Mike Friesen	
1996–97	John Bubbs	Mark Olson	Jim Spencer	Ron Kammerlock	
1997–98	Mark Olson	Paul Kelly	Dave Leclair	Quinn Provost	
1998–99	Mark Olson	Neil Patterson	Dave Leclair	Paul Kelly	
1999–00	Mark Olson	Peter Nicholls	Dean Dunstone	Charlie Salina	
2000–01	Dale Duguid	Mark Olson	Peter Nicholls	Steve Gould	
2001–02	Vic Peters	Mark Olson	Chris Neufeld	Steve Gould	
2002–03	Vic Peters	Mark Olson	Chris Neufeld	Steve Gould	
