= Jim Spencer (curler) =

Canadian male curler

- Curler ♂

Team
- Curling club: Assiniboine Memorial CC, Winnipeg, MB, Granite CC, Winnipeg, MB

Curling career
- Member Association: Manitoba
- Brier: 3: (1981, 1988, 1998)
- World Championship: 1 (1981)
Medal record
Curling
Representing Canada
World Championships
Bronze medal – third place	1981 London
Labatt Brier
Representing Manitoba
Gold medal – first place	1981 Halifax
Bronze medal – third place	1998 Winnipeg

James Spencer is a Canadian curler. He is a 1981 World Men's bronze medallist and a 1981 Brier champion.

== Awards ==
- Manitoba Curling Hall of Fame: 2008 (with all 1981 Canadian Men's Championship Team skipped by Kerry Burtnyk)

== Teams ==
Season	Skip	Third	Second	Lead	Alternate	Events
1980–81	Kerry Burtnyk	Mark Olson	Jim Spencer	Ron Kammerlock		Brier 1981 (gold); WCC 1981 (bronze)
1987–88	Kerry Burtnyk	Jim Spencer	Ron Kammerlock	Don Harvey	Jeff Ryan	Brier 1988 (4th)
1994–95	James Kirkness	Jim Spencer	Steve Gould	Ron Kammerlock		
1996–97	John Bubbs	Mark Olson	Jim Spencer	Ron Kammerlock		
1997–98	Dale Duguid	James Kirkness	Jim Spencer	Doug Armstrong	Barry Fry	Brier 1998 (bronze)
1998–99	James Kirkness	Dan Carey	Jim Spencer	Ron Kammerlock		
1999–00	Pat Spiring	Ken Tresoor	Jim Spencer	Scott Grant		
2001–02	Jeff Stoughton	Jon Mead	Garry Van Den Berghe	Doug Armstrong	Jim Spencer	COCT 2001 (6th)

== Personal life ==
Spencer is married to fellow curler Barb Spencer and has coached her team.
