= Andrew McLaren (curler) =

Scottish curler

- Curler

Team
- Curling club: Findo Gask CC, Perth, Scotland
- Skip: Willie McIntosh
- Third: Andrew McLaren
- Second: Jim Miller
- Lead: Bob Stirrat
Medal record
Representing Scotland
Men's Curling
World Championships
Silver medal – second place	1961 Scotland	Team

Andrew S. McLaren was the third on the Findo Gask CC curling team (from Perth, Scotland) during the World Curling Championships known as the 1961 Scotch Cup. The team won The Rink Championship in 1961.
