= Ken Sherwood =

American curler

- Curler

Team
- Curling club: Granite CC, Seattle, Washington
- Skip: Frank Crealock
- Third: Ken Sherwood
- Second: John Jamieson
- Lead: Bud McCartney
Medal record
Representing the United States
Men's Curling
World Championships
Bronze medal – third place	1961 Scotland	Team
US Men's Championship
Gold medal – first place	1961 Grand Forks

Kenneth Sherwood was an American curler. He played third on the Granite Curling Club team (from Seattle, Washington, United States) during the World Curling Championships known as the 1961 Scotch Cup. His team finished third out of the three teams competing.

In 1996 he was inducted to United States Curling Hall of Fame.
