= Ron Kammerlock =

Canadian curler (born 1959)

- Curler ♂
- Born: 1959 (age 66–67)

Team
- Curling club: Assiniboine Memorial CC, Winnipeg, MB

Curling career
- Member Association: Manitoba
- Brier: 2: (1981, 1988)
- World Championship: 1 (1981)
Medal record
Curling
Representing Canada
World Championships
Bronze medal – third place	1981 London
Labatt Brier
Representing Manitoba
Gold medal – first place	1981 Halifax

Ronald Kammerlock (born 1959) is a Canadian curler. He is a 1981 World Men's bronze medallist and a 1981 Brier champion.

== Career ==
As a junior curler, Kammerlock won the Manitoba junior men's championship in 1978, throwing second stones for the Kerry Burtnyk rink. The team finished tied for third at the Canadian Junior Curling Championships that year, with a 7–4 record.

=== 1981 World Championships ===
Following the team's loss in the semifinals at the 1981 World Championships to Switzerland, Kammerlock was involved in a "sharp exchange" with a Swiss reporter, who asked him if the Swiss team won "because of broom debris". Kammerlock had previously stated that the Swiss team had "no class" for repeatedly "snowplowing" (an illegal manoeuvre involving sweeping debris in front of a rock in an attempt to slow the rock down). Kammerlock's response to the reporter was "[w]hy don't you guys learn the rules of the game". Team Canada skip Kerry Burtnyk asked Kammerlock to cool down, and blamed the loss on himself. The team finished with a round robin record of 8–1 before their semifinal loss.

== Personal life ==
His son, Dan is a curler too. He played third on Kerry Burtnyk's Manitoba team at the 2008 Tim Hortons Brier. At the time of the 1981 Brier, Ron was a print shop camera operator.

== Awards ==
- Manitoba Curling Hall of Fame: 2008 (with all 1981 Canadian Men's Championship Team skipped by Kerry Burtnyk)

== Teams ==
Season	Skip	Third	Second	Lead	Alternate	Events
1977–78	Kerry Burtnyk	Greg Blanchard	Ron Kammerlock	Lyle Derry		CJCC 1978 (bronze)
1980–81	Kerry Burtnyk	Mark Olson	Jim Spencer	Ron Kammerlock		Brier 1981 (gold); WCC 1981 (bronze)
1987–88	Kerry Burtnyk	Jim Spencer	Ron Kammerlock	Don Harvey	Jeff Ryan	Brier 1988 (4th)
1994–95	James Kirkness	Jim Spencer	Steve Gould	Ron Kammerlock		
1996–97	John Bubbs	Mark Olson	Jim Spencer	Ron Kammerlock		
1998–99	James Kirkness	Dan Carey	Jim Spencer	Ron Kammerlock		
