= Bud McCartney =

American curler

- Curler

Team
- Curling club: Granite CC, Seattle, Washington
- Skip: Frank Crealock
- Third: Ken Sherwood
- Second: John Jamieson
- Lead: Bud McCartney
Medal record
Representing the United States
Men's Curling
World Championships
Bronze medal – third place	1961 Scotland	Team
US Men's Championship
Gold medal – first place	1961 Grand Forks

Bud McCartney was the lead on the Granite Curling Club curling team (from Seattle, Washington, United States) during the Curling World Championships known as the 1961 Scotch Cup, where United States team won bronze medal.
