= Stirratt =

Stirratt is a surname. Notable people with the surname include:

- John Stirratt (born 1967), American bassist and multi-instrumentalist
- Laurie Stirratt (fl. 1993–2013), member of the band Blue Mountain

== See also ==
- Stirrat (disambiguation)
