= Vic Raymer =

Canadian curler

- Curler

Team
- Curling club: Alberta Avenue CC, Edmonton, AB
- Skip: Hec Gervais
- Third: Ray Werner
- Second: Vic Raymer
- Lead: Wally Ursuliak

Vic Raymer was the Second man on the Alberta Avenue CC curling team (from Edmonton, Alberta, Canada) during the World Curling Championships known as the 1961 Scotch Cup.

Raymer replaced Ron Anton on the team for the world championships, as Anton stayed home to concentrate on his studies.
