= 2008 Canadian Senior Curling Championships =

- Host city: Prince Albert, Saskatchewan
- Arena: Prince Albert Golf and Curling Club
- Dates: March 22–30
- Men's winner: Saskatchewan
- Skip: Eugene Hritzuk
- Third: Kevin Kalthoff
- Second: Verne Anderson
- Lead: Dave Folk
- Finalist: New Brunswick
- Women's winner: British Columbia
- Skip: Pat Sanders
- Third: Cheryl Noble
- Second: Roselyn Craig
- Lead: Christine Jurgenson
- Finalist: Ontario

The 2008 Canadian Senior Curling Championships were held March 22–30 at the Prince Albert Golf and Curling Club in Prince Albert, Saskatchewan. The winning teams represented Canada at the 2009 World Senior Curling Championships.

Team Saskatchewan, consisting of Eugene Hritzuk, Kevin Kalthoff, Verne Anderson and Dave Folk won the men's event, defeating New Brunswick's Russ Howard rink in the final.

== Men's standings ==
Locale	Skip	W	L
New Brunswick	Russ Howard	9	2
Saskatchewan	Eugene Hritzuk	9	2
Nova Scotia	Brian Rafuse	9	2
Manitoba	Vic Peters	8	3
Ontario	Bruce Delaney	7	4
British Columbia	Ken McHargue	7	4
Northern Ontario	Murray Affleck	5	6
Prince Edward Island	Ted MacFadyen	4	7
Newfoundland and Labrador	Gary Oke	2	9
Yukon/Northwest Territories	Paul Hunter	2	9
Alberta	Bob Genoway	2	9
Quebec	John Stewart	2	9

=== Playoffs ===
Semi final		Final
Saskatchewan	6
Nova Scotia	5	New Brunswick	5
		Saskatchewan	7

== Women's ==
=== Teams ===
Province / Territory	Skip	Third	Second	Lead
Ontario	Ann Pearson	Elaine Voisin	Carolyn Edison	Mary Hallett
Nova Scotia	Yvonne Martin	Julie Morley	Andrea Saulnier	Audrey Dorey
Saskatchewan	Delores Syrota	Sylvia Broad	Gloria Leach	Bev Krasowski
Prince Edward Island	Barb Currie	Lana Simmons	Jeanette Rivard	Helen MacDonald
Quebec	Agnes Charette	Lois Baines	Marie Leblanc	Dianne Sullivan
British Columbia	Pat Sanders	Cheryl Noble	Roselyn Craig	Christine Jurgenson
Alberta	Sandy Turner	Linda Wagner	Marilyn Toews	Judy Carr
Manitoba	Jean Garbolinsky	Heather Lewis	Cheryl Orr	Diane Sadler
Northern Ontario	Barbara Ward	Janice Atkinson	Kathleen Bes	Jan Alexander
Newfoundland and Labrador	Barbara Pinsent	Marian Dawe	Joyce Nichols	Diane Ryan
Northwest Territories/Yukon	Gail Daniels	Margaret Begg	Terry Fisher	Marie Coe
New Brunswick	Maureen McMaster	Shirley Crawford	Pauline Barton	Donna Soucoup

=== Standings ===
Locale	Skip	W	L
British Columbia	Pat Sanders	10	1
Ontario	Ann Pearson	8	3
Alberta	Sandy Turner	8	3
Saskatchewan	Delores Syrota	7	4
Newfoundland and Labrador	Barbara Pinsent	6	5
Quebec	Agnes Charette	6	5
Manitoba	Jean Garbolinsky	5	6
Prince Edward Island	Barb Currie	5	6
Nova Scotia	Yvonne Martin	4	7
New Brunswick	Maureen McMaster	3	8
Northwest Territories/Yukon	Gail Daniels	2	9
Northern Ontario	Barbara Ward	2	9

=== Results ===
==== Draw 1 ====
Sheet B	1	2	3	4	5	6	7	8	9	10	Final
Northwest Territories/Yukon (Daniels)	0	1	1	0	0	1	2	0	1	0	6
Ontario (Garbolinsky)	0	0	0	1	1	0	0	3	0	3	8

Sheet D	1	2	3	4	5	6	7	8	9	10	Final
Northern Ontario (Ward)	0	0	1	1	0	2	0	2	0	0	6
New Brunswick (McMaster)	0	2	0	0	1	0	1	0	1	0	5

Sheet F	1	2	3	4	5	6	7	8	9	10	Final
Saskatchewan (Syrota)	0	1	0	0	3	0	1	1	1	2	9
Newfoundland and Labrador (Pinsent)	2	0	2	1	0	1	0	0	0	0	6

==== Draw 2 ====
Sheet B	1	2	3	4	5	6	7	8	9	10	Final
British Columbia (Sanders)	0	0	1	0	2	0	2	0	1	X	6
Ontario (Pearson)	0	0	0	1	0	1	0	1	0	X	3

Sheet D	1	2	3	4	5	6	7	8	9	10	Final
Quebec (Charette)	0	1	1	1	1	0	0	2	0	3	9
Nova Scotia (Martin)	1	0	0	0	0	1	1	0	3	0	6

Sheet F	1	2	3	4	5	6	7	8	9	10	Final
Alberta (Turner)	1	1	0	0	1	0	1	1	0	1	6
Prince Edward Island (Currie)	0	0	1	1	0	0	0	0	1	0	3

==== Draw 3 ====
Sheet B	1	2	3	4	5	6	7	8	9	10	Final
Northern Ontario (Ward)	1	0	2	1	1	1	0	4	X	X	10
Saskatchewan (Syrota)	0	1	0	0	0	0	1	0	X	X	2

Sheet D	1	2	3	4	5	6	7	8	9	10	Final
Newfoundland and Labrador (Pinsent)	2	1	0	0	0	2	2	0	5	X	12
Northwest Territories/Yukon (Daniels)	0	0	1	0	1	0	0	2	0	X	4

Sheet F	1	2	3	4	5	6	7	8	9	10	Final
Manitoba (Garbolinsky)	2	1	1	0	2	0	0	2	0	X	8
New Brunswick (McMaster)	0	0	0	2	0	1	1	0	1	X	5

==== Draw 4 ====
Sheet A	1	2	3	4	5	6	7	8	9	10	Final
New Brunswick (McMaster)	1	0	0	0	2	0	1	1	0	0	5
Newfoundland and Labrador (Pinsent)	0	3	1	1	0	1	0	0	1	2	9

Sheet C	1	2	3	4	5	6	7	8	9	10	11	Final
Quebec (Charette)	1	1	1	1	1	1	0	0	0	0	1	7
Ontario (Pearson)	0	0	0	0	0	0	2	2	1	1	0	6

Sheet E	1	2	3	4	5	6	7	8	9	10	Final
Northern Ontario (Ward)	2	0	0	2	0	1	0	0	1	X	6
Manitoba (Garbolinsky)	0	1	2	0	3	0	2	2	0	X	10

==== Draw 5 ====
Sheet B	1	2	3	4	5	6	7	8	9	10	Final
Alberta (Turner)	1	0	3	0	0	2	0	1	2	X	9
Quebec (Charette)	0	1	0	2	0	0	1	0	0	X	4

Sheet D	1	2	3	4	5	6	7	8	9	10	Final
British Columbia (Sanders)	4	1	2	0	4	2	X	X	X	X	13
Prince Edward Island (Currie)	0	0	0	1	0	0	X	X	X	X	1

Sheet F	1	2	3	4	5	6	7	8	9	10	Final
Nova Scotia (Martin)	0	1	0	6	0	0	3	X	X	X	10
Ontario (Pearson)	0	0	1	0	0	1	0	X	X	X	2

==== Draw 6 ====
Sheet A	1	2	3	4	5	6	7	8	9	10	Final
Northwest Territories/Yukon (Daniels)	3	0	0	3	0	4	0	1	1	2	14
Northern Ontario (Ward)	0	1	4	0	1	0	4	0	0	0	10

Sheet C	1	2	3	4	5	6	7	8	9	10	Final
Manitoba (Garbolinsky)	1	0	0	2	1	0	1	0	0	X	5
Newfoundland and Labrador (Pinsent)	0	0	1	0	0	2	0	2	4	X	9

Sheet E	1	2	3	4	5	6	7	8	9	10	Final
Saskatchewan (Syrota)	2	1	0	2	0	1	0	3	1	X	10
New Brunswick (McMaster)	0	0	2	0	2	0	1	0	0	X	5

==== Draw 7 ====
Sheet B	1	2	3	4	5	6	7	8	9	10	Final
Prince Edward Island (Currie)	1	0	1	1	0	2	2	0	0	1	8
Nova Scotia (Martin)	0	2	0	0	1	0	0	1	3	0	7

Sheet C	1	2	3	4	5	6	7	8	9	10	Final
British Columbia (Sanders)	2	0	1	0	2	0	0	2	0	X	7
Alberta (Turner)	0	1	0	1	0	1	1	0	0	X	4

Sheet F	1	2	3	4	5	6	7	8	9	10	11	Final
Saskatchewan (Syrota)	1	0	1	0	0	3	0	0	2	0	1	8
Northwest Territories/Yukon (Daniels)	0	1	0	1	1	0	0	2	0	2	0	7

==== Draw 8 ====
Sheet B	1	2	3	4	5	6	7	8	9	10	11	Final
Newfoundland and Labrador (Pinsent)	1	0	1	0	1	0	0	1	0	2	1	7
Northern Ontario (Ward)	0	1	0	1	0	1	1	0	2	0	0	6

Sheet C	1	2	3	4	5	6	7	8	9	10	Final
Ontario (Pearson)	2	0	1	1	2	4	X	X	X	X	10
Prince Edward Island (Currie)	0	4	0	0	0	0	X	X	X	X	4

Sheet F	1	2	3	4	5	6	7	8	9	10	Final
Nova Scotia (Martin)	2	0	2	0	1	0	1	0	2	0	8
New Brunswick (McMaster)	0	2	0	1	0	2	0	1	0	3	9

==== Draw 9 ====
Sheet A	1	2	3	4	5	6	7	8	9	10	Final
Alberta (Turner)	2	1	0	0	2	0	1	0	0	1	7
Saskatchewan (Syrota)	0	0	2	1	0	2	0	1	0	0	6

Sheet D	1	2	3	4	5	6	7	8	9	10	Final
Ontario (Pearson)	0	2	0	1	0	0	1	0	2	1	7
Manitoba (Garbolinsky)	1	0	2	0	0	2	0	1	0	0	6

Sheet E	1	2	3	4	5	6	7	8	9	10	Final
Quebec (Charette)	0	1	0	3	0	1	1	0	1	1	8
Northwest Territories/Yukon (Daniels)	1	0	1	0	1	0	0	3	0	0	6

==== Draw 10 ====
Sheet A	1	2	3	4	5	6	7	8	9	10	Final
New Brunswick (McMaster)	2	1	0	1	0	0	2	3	0	X	9
Northwest Territories/Yukon (Daniels)	0	0	4	0	1	1	0	0	1	X	7

Sheet C	1	2	3	4	5	6	7	8	9	10	Final
Northern Ontario (Ward)	0	1	0	0	0	0	X	X	X	X	1
British Columbia (Sanders)	0	0	2	2	2	3	X	X	X	X	9

Sheet E	1	2	3	4	5	6	7	8	9	10	Final
Prince Edward Island (Currie)	1	0	0	2	0	1	0	2	2	X	8
Newfoundland and Labrador (Pinsent)	0	0	2	0	1	0	1	0	0	X	4

==== Draw 11 ====
Sheet B	1	2	3	4	5	6	7	8	9	10	Final
Quebec (Charette)	1	0	0	1	0	1	0	1	1	0	5
British Columbia (Sanders)	0	1	0	0	2	0	3	0	0	1	7

Sheet C	1	2	3	4	5	6	7	8	9	10	Final
Saskatchewan (Syrota)	2	2	0	1	0	0	0	2	1	X	8
Manitoba (Garbolinsky)	0	0	1	0	1	1	1	0	0	X	4

Sheet E	1	2	3	4	5	6	7	8	9	10	Final
Alberta (Turner)	0	1	0	0	1	0	0	2	0	X	4
Nova Scotia (Martin)	1	0	2	1	0	0	2	0	3	X	9

==== Draw 12 ====
Sheet A	1	2	3	4	5	6	7	8	9	10	Final
Manitoba (Garbolinsky)	2	1	1	1	0	0	5	X	X	X	10
Quebec (Charette)	0	0	0	0	1	1	0	X	X	X	2

Sheet D	1	2	3	4	5	6	7	8	9	10	Final
Northwest Territories/Yukon (Daniels)	0	2	0	1	0	2	0	X	X	X	5
Alberta (Turner)	1	0	5	0	4	0	5	X	X	X	15

Sheet F	1	2	3	4	5	6	7	8	9	10	Final
Ontario (Pearson)	0	0	1	0	1	1	0	1	0	2	6
Saskatchewan (Syrota)	0	0	0	2	0	0	1	0	1	0	4

==== Draw 13 ====
Sheet B	1	2	3	4	5	6	7	8	9	10	Final
New Brunswick (McMaster)	0	0	1	0	0	3	2	0	0	X	6
Prince Edward Island (Currie)	2	1	0	0	4	0	0	1	1	X	9

Sheet C	1	2	3	4	5	6	7	8	9	10	Final
Nova Scotia (Martin)	0	1	2	2	0	1	0	0	4	X	10
Northern Ontario (Ward)	1	0	0	0	3	0	0	1	0	X	5

Sheet F	1	2	3	4	5	6	7	8	9	10	Final
British Columbia (Sanders)	0	2	1	0	2	0	1	0	2	X	8
Newfoundland and Labrador (Pinsent)	0	0	0	2	0	1	0	1	0	X	4

==== Draw 14 ====
Sheet B	1	2	3	4	5	6	7	8	9	10	Final
Ontario (Pearson)	0	1	0	2	0	0	3	1	1	X	8
Northwest Territories/Yukon (Daniels)	0	0	1	0	1	1	0	0	0	X	3

Sheet D	1	2	3	4	5	6	7	8	9	10	Final
Saskatchewan (Syrota)	1	0	1	0	0	1	3	0	0	X	6
Quebec (Charette)	0	1	0	3	3	0	0	3	2	X	12

Sheet E	1	2	3	4	5	6	7	8	9	10	Final
Manitoba (Garbolinsky)	0	0	1	0	1	2	0	1	0	X	5
Alberta (Turner)	1	1	0	5	0	0	2	0	2	X	11

==== Draw 15 ====
Sheet A	1	2	3	4	5	6	7	8	9	10	11	Final
Newfoundland and Labrador (Pinsent)	0	1	1	0	2	0	1	1	0	1	1	8
Nova Scotia (Martin)	0	0	0	3	0	2	0	0	2	0	0	7

Sheet D	1	2	3	4	5	6	7	8	9	10	Final
British Columbia (Sanders)	1	0	2	0	0	1	0	2	0	1	7
New Brunswick (McMaster)	0	1	0	1	0	0	2	0	1	0	5

Sheet F	1	2	3	4	5	6	7	8	9	10	Final
Prince Edward Island (Currie)	1	0	0	3	0	0	3	5	X	X	12
Northern Ontario (Ward)	0	0	0	0	1	1	0	0	X	X	2

==== Draw 16 ====
Sheet B	1	2	3	4	5	6	7	8	9	10	Final
Nova Scotia (Martin)	0	1	0	1	0	1	0	1	1	X	5
Saskatchewan (Syrota)	1	0	3	0	3	0	0	0	0	X	7

Sheet D	1	2	3	4	5	6	7	8	9	10	Final
Prince Edward Island (Currie)	0	0	1	0	3	0	0	0	0	X	4
Manitoba (Garbolinsky)	1	0	0	2	0	5	0	1	1	X	10

Sheet F	1	2	3	4	5	6	7	8	9	10	Final
Northwest Territories/Yukon (Daniels)	1	0	1	1	0	1	0	2	0	1	7
British Columbia (Sanders)	0	2	0	0	3	0	1	0	3	0	9

==== Draw 17 ====
Sheet B	1	2	3	4	5	6	7	8	9	10	Final
Alberta (Turner)	2	0	1	2	2	1	1	X	X	X	9
New Brunswick (McMaster)	0	1	0	0	0	0	0	X	X	X	1

Sheet D	1	2	3	4	5	6	7	8	9	10	Final
Northern Ontario (Ward)	0	1	0	0	2	0	2	0	2	0	7
Quebec (Charette)	1	0	0	1	0	2	0	1	0	3	8

Sheet E	1	2	3	4	5	6	7	8	9	10	Final
Newfoundland and Labrador (Pinsent)	0	1	0	0	0	1	2	0	0	0	4
Ontario (Pearson)	0	0	1	0	1	0	0	2	1	2	7

==== Draw 18 ====
Sheet B	1	2	3	4	5	6	7	8	9	10	Final
British Columbia (Sanders)	3	1	0	1	3	1	X	X	X	X	9
Manitoba (Garbolinsky)	0	0	1	0	0	0	X	X	X	X	1

Sheet C	1	2	3	4	5	6	7	8	9	10	Final
Northwest Territories/Yukon (Daniels)	1	0	4	0	0	0	1	0	2	X	8
Nova Scotia (Martin)	0	1	0	2	1	0	0	1	0	X	5

Sheet E	1	2	3	4	5	6	7	8	9	10	Final
Prince Edward Island (Currie)	0	0	0	1	0	1	0	0	1	0	3
Saskatchewan (Syrota)	0	1	1	0	1	0	0	1	0	1	5

==== Draw 19 ====
Sheet B	1	2	3	4	5	6	7	8	9	10	Final
Quebec (Charette)	0	2	1	0	1	0	1	0	0	1	6
Newfoundland and Labrador (Pinsent)	0	0	0	1	0	2	0	2	2	0	7

Sheet C	1	2	3	4	5	6	7	8	9	10	Final
New Brunswick (McMaster)	2	0	1	0	1	1	0	0	2	0	7
Ontario (Pearson)	0	4	0	2	0	0	1	2	0	0	9

Sheet E	1	2	3	4	5	6	7	8	9	10	Final
Alberta (Turner)	1	0	0	1	0	2	0	1	0	X	5
Northern Ontario (Ward)	0	0	1	0	1	0	0	0	1	X	3

==== Draw 20 ====
Sheet A	1	2	3	4	5	6	7	8	9	10	Final
Ontario (Pearson)	0	1	0	1	0	1	0	4	0	1	8
Alberta (Turner)	0	0	1	0	1	0	2	0	1	0	5

Sheet C	1	2	3	4	5	6	7	8	9	10	Final
Quebec (Charette)	3	1	0	1	1	0	0	2	2	X	10
Prince Edward Island (Currie)	0	0	1	0	0	1	2	0	0	X	4

Sheet E	1	2	3	4	5	6	7	8	9	10	Final
Nova Scotia (Martin)	1	0	1	0	1	1	0	0	2	0	6
British Columbia (Sanders)	0	1	0	2	0	0	3	1	0	1	8

==== Draw 21 ====
Sheet A	1	2	3	4	5	6	7	8	9	10	Final
Northwest Territories/Yukon (Daniels)	0	1	0	0	2	0	0	2	1	0	6
Prince Edward Island (Currie)	0	0	1	1	0	2	1	0	0	2	7

Sheet D	1	2	3	4	5	6	7	8	9	10	Final
Saskatchewan (Syrota)	2	1	2	0	1	0	0	0	0	1	7
British Columbia (Sanders)	0	0	0	1	0	1	1	1	1	0	5

Sheet F	1	2	3	4	5	6	7	8	9	10	Final
Manitoba (Garbolinsky)	2	0	1	1	0	1	0	0	2	0	7
Nova Scotia (Martin)	0	2	0	0	2	0	1	1	0	2	8

==== Draw 22 ====
Sheet A	1	2	3	4	5	6	7	8	9	10	Final
Northern Ontario (Ward)	1	0	0	0	0	0	1	X	X	X	2
Ontario (Pearson)	0	1	2	0	1	3	0	X	X	X	7

Sheet D	1	2	3	4	5	6	7	8	9	10	Final
Newfoundland and Labrador (Pinsent)	0	2	0	1	1	0	1	0	0	X	5
Alberta (Turner)	1	0	2	0	0	2	0	2	1	X	8

Sheet F	1	2	3	4	5	6	7	8	9	10	Final
New Brunswick (McMaster)	1	0	1	0	0	3	2	2	0	X	9
Quebec (Charette)	0	1	0	1	1	0	0	0	1	X	4

=== Playoffs ===
Semifinal		Final
Ontario	8
Alberta	5	British Columbia	7
		Ontario	5

==== Semifinal ====
Sheet E	1	2	3	4	5	6	7	8	9	10	Final
Ontario (Pearson)	0	0	1	1	3	0	1	0	2	X	8
Alberta (Turner)	0	2	0	0	0	1	0	2	0	X	5

Player percentages
Ontario		Alberta	
Mary Hallett	86%	Judy Carr	93%
Carolyn Edison	83%	Marilyn Toews	81%
Elaine Voisin	86%	Linda Wagner	95%
Ann Pearson	83%	Sandy Turner	78%
Total	84%	Total	87%

==== Final ====
Sheet E	1	2	3	4	5	6	7	8	9	10	Final
Ontario (Pearson)	0	0	1	1	0	2	0	0	1	X	5
British Columbia (Sanders)	1	1	0	0	3	0	0	2	0	X	7

Player percentages
Ontario		British Columbia	
Mary Hallett	83%	Christine Jurgenson	78%
Carolyn Edison	90%	Roselyn Craig	86%
Elaine Voisin	76%	Cheryl Noble	79%
Ann Pearson	71%	Pat Sanders	76%
Total	80%	Total	80%
