= Ray Werner =

Canadian curler

- Curler
- Born: c. 1935
- Died: May 17, 1998 (aged 62); Fort Saskatchewan, Alberta, Canada

Team
- Curling club: Alberta Avenue CC, Edmonton, AB
- Skip: Hec Gervais
- Third: Ray Werner
- Second: Vic Raymer
- Lead: Wally Ursuliak

Raymond Werner (c. 1935 – May 17, 1998) was the third on the Alberta Avenue CC curling team (from Edmonton, Alberta, Canada) during the World Curling Championships known as the 1961 Scotch Cup. He died in 1998.
