= Eugene Hritzuk =

Canadian curler (born 1949)

- Curler
- Born: October 12, 1949 (age 77); St. Walburg, Saskatchewan, Canada

Curling career
- Brier: 3 (1985, 1986, 1988)
Medal record
Men's curling
Representing Canada
World Senior Championships
Gold medal – first place	2009 Dunedin
Representing Saskatchewan
The Brier
Silver medal – second place	1988 Chicoutimi-Jonquière
Bronze medal – third place	1985 Moncton

Eugene Hritzuk (October 12, 1949) is a Canadian curler from Saskatoon, Saskatchewan. He is a former World Senior men's champion skip.

Hritzuk has won two provincial championships as skip, once in 1985 and again in 1988. This qualified him for the Brier both times. At the 1985 Labatt Brier, he finished the round robin with a 6-5 record. He had to play in two tie-breakers, which he won to get to the semi-final, where he lost to Northern Ontario's Al Hackner. He was the alternate for Saskatchewan at the 1986 Labatt Brier. At the 1988 Labatt Brier, he finished the Brier with an 8-3 record, and lost to Alberta's Pat Ryan in the final. It would be his last Brier.

Since then, Hritzuk has been a successful seniors curler, and has represented Saskatchewan at the Canadian Seniors Championships in 2002, 2005, 2006, 2008, 2009 and 2012. He won his first Canadian Seniors Championship in 2008. Hritzuk won the World Senior Curling Championships in May 2009. Hritzuk has also represented Saskatchewan at the Canadian Masters Curling Championships in 2010, 2012, 2013, 2014, 2016 and 2018 winning the Canadian Masters Championship in 2014.

Since 2019 Hritzuk has taken a deeper dive into the science behind curling. He has teamed up with Dr. Sean Maw from the College of Engineering at the University of Saskatchewan to undertake research on brushing. This has led them into some cutting edge studies on the science behind why stones curl and how brushing impacts the ice and the trajectory of stones. They have done research work for World Curling to examine and evaluate a variety of brushing techniques and equipment.
