= Frank Crealock =

American curler

- Curler
- Born: February 11, 1925; Portage La Prairie, Manitoba, Canada
- Died: April 14, 2016 (aged 91); Palm Desert, California, U.S.

Team
- Curling club: Granite CC, Seattle, Washington
- Skip: Frank Crealock
- Third: Ken Sherwood
- Second: John Jamieson
- Lead: Bud McCartney
Medal record
Representing the United States
Men's Curling
World Championships
Bronze medal – third place	1961 Scotland	Team
US Men's Championship
Gold medal – first place	1961 Grand Forks

Dr. Frank William "Crea" Crealock (February 11, 1925 – April 14, 2016) was the skip on the Granite Curling Club curling team (from Seattle, Washington, United States) during the World Curling Championships known as the 1961 Scotch Cup.

== Early life ==
Crealock was born in Portage La Prairie, Manitoba in 1925, the son of William Crealock and Kathleen Beckett. He graduated from the medical school at the University of Manitoba and was trained as an obstetrician-gynecologist at the University of Iowa. While in the United States, he joined the United States Air Force in the mid-1950s as an officer, becoming a flight surgeon stationed at Bergstrom Air Force Base in Austin, Texas. Following his military service, he moved to Seattle where he established an obstetrician-gynecologist practise.

== Curling career ==
Crealock led his team to a gold medal at the 1961 US National Championship in Grand Forks, North Dakota, finishing with a record of 6–2.

== Personal life ==
Crealock was married and had five children.
