= Hec Gervais =

Canadian curler (1933–1997)

- Curler
- Born: November 4, 1933; St. Albert, Alberta, Canada
- Died: July 19, 1997 (aged 63); Edmonton, Alberta, Canada

Curling career
- Brier: 4 (1961, 1962, 1970, 1974)
- World Championship: 2 (1961, 1974)
Medal record
Representing Canada
Men's Curling
World Championships
Gold medal – first place	1961 Scotland	Team
Representing Alberta
Macdonald Brier
Gold medal – first place	1961 Calgary
Gold medal – first place	1974 London
Silver medal – second place	1962 Kitchener
Silver medal – second place	1970 Winnipeg

Hector Joseph "The Friendly Giant" Gervais (November 4, 1933 – July 19, 1997) was a Canadian curler from Edmonton, Alberta. He was a two-time Brier champion and former World Champion. In curling strategy, he is considered to be the inventor of the corner guard.

Gervais broke into the curling scene in the late 1950s, and in 1960 he teamed up with curling great Matt Baldwin to play in the Alberta provincials that year. Despite being considered a "super squad", the team didn't make it out of the province and disbanded after the season. Gervais would form his own team of Ron Anton, Ray Werner and Wally Ursuliak. This team would win the Alberta provincials, and also won that year's Macdonald Brier. The team (with Vic Raymer in place of Anton) closed the season by winning the 1961 Scotch Cup, becoming World Champions. At the time, the "gentle giant" weighed 270 pounds.

The Gervais rink would return to the Brier again in 1962, but lost in a playoff to Ernie Richardson's Saskatchewan rink.

Gervais would not return to the Brier until 1970. At that Brier, his team of Bill Mitchell, Wayne Saboe and Bill Tainsh posted an impressive 8–2 record, but it would only be good for second place, finishing behind Manitoba's Don Duguid.

Gervais made his last trip to the Brier in 1974. He re-united with Anton and teamed up with Warren Hansen and Darrel Sutton. The team again finished with an 8–2 record. This time it was good enough to win the Brier. The win sent them to the 1974 World Championships. The team finished in fourth place, after losing its semi-final matchup to Sweden 8–7.

Gervais, who weighed between 285 and 340 pounds during his curling career, had heart problems for much of his later life. In 1987, he had undergone heart surgery. He succumbed to a heart attack and died in 1997.

== Personal life ==
Gervais was a potato farmer and raised chickens on a farm outside of St. Albert. He would later be the manager of the Avonair Curling Club. He was married twice, and had five children and two stepchildren. In addition to curling, he played three preseason games for the Edmonton Eskimos in 1963.
