= 1961 Scotch Cup =

Curling championship

- Host city: Ayr, Kirkcaldy, Perth & Edinburgh, Scotland
- Arena: Unknown
- Dates: 21–30 March 1961
- Winner: Canada
- Curling club: Alberta Avenue CC; Edmonton, Alberta
- Skip: Hec Gervais
- Third: Ray Werner
- Second: Vic Raymer
- Lead: Wally Ursuliak
- Finalist: Scotland

The 1961 Scotch Cup was the third edition of the men's World Curling Championship. It was held across four venues: Ayr, Kirkcaldy, Perth and Edinburgh, Scotland. The tournament began with games in Ayr on 21 March. The second and third days were on 22 and 23 March in Kirkcaldy, and the fourth day was in Perth on 24 March.

The tournament was expanded to a three team competition with the United States debuting in the tournament. After the three teams ended up tied with a 2-2 win–loss record, a playoff was played with the semi-final played on 25 March in Perth and the final played in Edinburgh on 30 March. In the final, Canada won the Scotch Cup for the third time with a 12-7 win over Scotland in the final.

== Teams ==
| Canada | Scotland | United States |
|---|---|---|
| Alberta Avenue CC, Edmonton, Alberta Skip: Hec Gervais; Third: Ray Werner; Second: Vic Raymer; Lead: Wally Ursuliak | Findo Gask CC, Perth Skip: Willie McIntosh; Third: Andrew McLaren; Second: Jim Miller; Lead: Bob Stirrat | Granite CC, Seattle, Washington Skip: Dr. Frank Crealock; Third: Ken Sherwood; Second: John Jamieson; Lead: Bud McCartney |

== Standings ==
| Country | Skip | W | L |
|---|---|---|---|
| Scotland | Willie McIntosh | 2 | 2 |
| Canada | Hec Gervais | 2 | 2 |
| United States | Frank Crealock | 2 | 2 |

== Results ==
=== Draw 1 ===
| Team | Final |
| Scotland (McIntosh) | 9 |
| United States (Crealock) | 8 |

=== Draw 2 ===
At Ayr Curling Rink.

| Team | 1 | 2 | 3 | 4 | 5 | 6 | 7 | 8 | 9 | 10 | 11 | 12 | Final |
| Canada (Gervais) | 3 | 0 | 0 | ? | ? | ? | 3 | ? | ? | 1 | 0 | 2 | 11 |
| Scotland (McIntosh) | 0 | 3 | 2 | ? | ? | ? | 0 | ? | ? | 0 | 2 | 0 | 10 |

=== Draw 3 ===
| Team | 1 | 2 | 3 | 4 | 5 | 6 | 7 | 8 | 9 | 10 | 11 | 12 | Final |
| Canada (Gervais) | 2 | 1 | 0 | 0 | 2 | 2 | 0 | 2 | 2 | 0 | 1 | 0 | 10 |
| United States (Crealock) | 0 | 0 | 1 | 2 | 0 | 0 | 1 | 1 | 0 | 1 | 0 | 0 | 6 |

=== Draw 4 ===
23 March, Kirkcaldy

| Team | 1 | 2 | 3 | 4 | 5 | 6 | 7 | 8 | 9 | 10 | 11 | 12 | Final |
| Scotland (McIntosh) | 0 | 0 | 1 | 0 | 4 | 2 | 0 | 1 | 0 | 1 | 0 | 0 | 9 |
| United States (Crealock) | 2 | 1 | 0 | 1 | 0 | 0 | 2 | 0 | 1 | 0 | 2 | 2 | 11 |

=== Draw 5 ===
| Team | 1 | 2 | 3 | 4 | 5 | 6 | 7 | 8 | 9 | 10 | 11 | 12 | Final |
| Canada (Gervais) | 1 | 0 | 3 | 1 | 0 | 0 | 0 | 0 | 0 | 1 | 0 | 0 | 6 |
| United States (Crealock) | 0 | 1 | 0 | 0 | 2 | 3 | 2 | 1 | 1 | 0 | 1 | 2 | 13 |

=== Draw 6 ===
| Team | 1 | 2 | 3 | 4 | 5 | 6 | 7 | 8 | 9 | 10 | 11 | 12 | Final |
| Canada (Gervais) | 0 | 1 | 0 | 1 | 1 | 0 | 0 | 0 | 0 | 1 | 0 | X | 4 |
| Scotland (McIntosh) | 1 | 0 | 1 | 0 | 0 | 2 | 1 | 5 | 3 | 0 | 2 | X | 15 |

== Playoffs ==
| Semi-Final | | | Final |
| | | | 1 | Scotland | 7 |
| 2 | Canada | 14 | 2 | Canada | 12 |
| 3 | United States | 9 |

=== Semi final ===
| Team | 1 | 2 | 3 | 4 | 5 | 6 | 7 | 8 | 9 | 10 | 11 | 12 | Final |
| Canada (Gervais) | 0 | 2 | 1 | 0 | 4 | 0 | 1 | 0 | 3 | 0 | 3 | X | 14 |
| United States (Crealock) | 2 | 0 | 0 | 4 | 0 | 1 | 0 | 1 | 0 | 1 | 0 | X | 9 |

=== Final ===
| Team | 1 | 2 | 3 | 4 | 5 | 6 | 7 | 8 | 9 | 10 | 11 | 12 | Final |
| Canada (Gervais) | 2 | 1 | 0 | 1 | 0 | 0 | 3 | 0 | 2 | 0 | 3 | X | 12 |
| Scotland (McIntosh) | 0 | 0 | 1 | 0 | 1 | 1 | 0 | 2 | 0 | 2 | 0 | X | 7 |

1961 Scotch Cup
Canada
3rd title
