= 1963 Macdonald Brier =

Canadian men's curling championship

- Host city: Brandon, Manitoba
- Arena: Wheat City Arena
- Dates: March 4–8
- Attendance: 42,113
- Winner: Saskatchewan
- Curling club: Regina CC, Regina
- Skip: Ernie Richardson
- Third: Arnold Richardson
- Second: Garnet Richardson
- Lead: Mel Perry

The 1963 Macdonald Brier, the Canadian men's national curling championship, was held from March 4 to 8, 1963 at the Wheat City Arena in Brandon, Manitoba. A total of 42,113 fans attended the event.

Team Saskatchewan, skipped by Ernie Richardson, captured the Brier Tankard by finishing round robin play with a 9–1 record. This would be Saskatchewan's fifth Brier championship and the fourth one in five years that Richardson had skipped. Unlike their previous three Brier championships, the Richardson rink won with a different lead as Mel Perry replaced Ernie's cousin, Wes Richardson, due to back issues.

The championship was essentially decided in the penultimate 10th draw, when Saskatchewan (with a 7–1 record at the time) played against Alberta (8–1). The 10th draw drew a capacity crowd of 4,211, with fans lining up hours before the draw in sub-zero temperatures to claim the last remaining seats. In the game, Alberta took a 5–4 lead after six ends. However, Saskatchewan scored a three-ender in the seventh, when Ernie Richardson made a precise angle take-out with back ring weight around a guard. Alberta skip Jimmy Shields was heavy on both his draws in the ninth end, missing a chance to score two. He over compensated in the 10th end, coming up short on his final draw, with Saskatchewan ending up scoring two, to take a 7–5 lead. In the 11th end, Shields was forced to draw against three on his last rock, and came up short again, giving up a steal of three, to go down 10–5. Alberta scored three in the final end, but it wasn't enough, losing to Saskatchewan by a final score of 10–8. With Alberta having the bye in the final draw, Saskatchewan still had to win their final match against Prince Edward Island to claim the championship, which they did 10–4.

This was also the fourth instance in which a skip had won back-to-back Brier championships and the second time that Richardson had done so as he previously achieved this in 1959 and 1960. As of 2022, Richardson is the only skip to win back-to-back Briers on two separate occasions.

== Teams ==
The teams are listed as follows:

Alberta	British Columbia	Manitoba	New Brunswick
Calgary CC, Calgary Skip: Jimmy Shields; Third: Ron Northcott; Second: Ron Baker; Lead: Fred Storey	Duncan CC, Duncan Skip: Glen Harper; Third: Harvey Hodge; Second: Gary Merrett; Lead: Vernon Kaspick	Maple Leaf CC, Winnipeg Skip: Hersh Lerner; Third: Coleman Staniloff; Second: Robert Lemecha; Lead: Allan Dudar	Beaver CC, Moncton Skip: Don Mix; Third: Raymond Gingles; Second: Robert Boby; Lead: James Macelwain
Newfoundland	Northern Ontario	Nova Scotia	Ontario
Grand Falls CC, Grand Falls Skip: John Pike; Third: Roy Baker; Second: Denzelo Goodyear; Lead: Ronald Hovey	Copper Cliff CC, Copper Cliff Skip: Doug Gathercole; Third: Lawrence Sauve; Second: Bernard LeClair; Lead: Arthur Dubery	Glooscap CC, Kentville Skip: Ian Baird; Third: Donald Campbell; Second: Duncan Smith; Lead: Morris Kennie	Hanover CC, Hanover Skip: Robert Mann; Third: Kenneth Buchan; Second: Keith Munro; Lead: Richard Palmer
Prince Edward Island	Quebec	Saskatchewan
Charlottetown CC, Charlottetown Skip: Douglas Cameron; Third: George Dillon; Second: Allison Saunders; Lead: Arnold Llewellyn	Heather CC, Westmount Skip: William Kent; Third: Douglas Wood; Second: Ronald Fellows; Lead: Keith Sproule	Regina CC, Regina Skip: Ernie Richardson; Third: Arnold Richardson; Second: Garnet Richardson; Lead: Mel Perry

== Round-robin standings ==
Key
Brier champion

Province	Skip	W	L	PF	PA
Saskatchewan	Ernie Richardson	9	1	96	74
British Columbia	Glen Harper	8	2	99	65
Alberta	Jimmy Shields	8	2	95	67
Ontario	Robert Mann	6	4	81	73
Northern Ontario	Douglas Gathercole	6	4	81	71
Prince Edward Island	Douglas Cameron	5	5	81	85
Nova Scotia	Ian Baird	4	6	83	80
New Brunswick	Don Mix	3	7	78	98
Manitoba	Hersh Lerner	3	7	84	113
Quebec	William Kent	3	7	77	94
Newfoundland	John Pike	1	9	60	118

== Round-robin results ==
All draw times are listed in Central Time (UTC-06:00)

=== Draw 1 ===
Monday, March 4 3:00 PM

Sheet A	1	2	3	4	5	6	7	8	9	10	11	12	Final
Manitoba (Lerner)	0	1	0	2	0	1	0	0	0	0	0	0	4
Saskatchewan (Richardson)	1	0	1	0	2	0	3	1	3	3	1	1	16

Sheet B	1	2	3	4	5	6	7	8	9	10	11	12	Final
Northern Ontario (Gathercole)	0	0	0	2	0	0	3	3	2	0	1	2	13
New Brunswick (Mix)	1	1	1	0	0	1	0	0	0	1	0	0	5

Sheet C	1	2	3	4	5	6	7	8	9	10	11	12	Final
Alberta (Shields)	0	0	2	0	4	0	0	1	2	1	0	0	10
Prince Edward Island (Cameron)	2	1	0	1	0	1	1	0	0	0	2	1	9

Sheet D	1	2	3	4	5	6	7	8	9	10	11	12	Final
Ontario (Mann)	2	0	4	0	1	0	1	0	0	1	0	2	11
Quebec (Kent)	0	1	0	1	0	1	0	1	1	0	1	0	6

Sheet E	1	2	3	4	5	6	7	8	9	10	11	12	Final
Newfoundland (Pike)	0	2	0	1	0	0	0	0	1	0	1	1	6
Nova Scotia (Baird)	3	0	2	0	0	1	1	0	0	6	0	0	13

=== Draw 2 ===
Monday, March 4 8:00 PM

Sheet A	1	2	3	4	5	6	7	8	9	10	11	12	Final
Newfoundland (Pike)	0	0	0	1	0	1	0	1	0	0	1	0	4
Saskatchewan (Richardson)	1	2	0	0	2	0	3	0	0	1	0	2	11

Sheet B	1	2	3	4	5	6	7	8	9	10	11	12	13	Final
British Columbia (Harper)	0	2	0	2	0	0	0	3	0	0	2	0	1	10
Quebec (Kent)	1	0	2	0	1	0	0	0	1	1	0	3	0	9

Sheet C	1	2	3	4	5	6	7	8	9	10	11	12	Final
Nova Scotia (Baird)	0	0	1	0	1	0	1	0	1	2	5	0	11
New Brunswick (Mix)	1	1	0	1	0	1	0	1	0	0	0	1	6

Sheet D	1	2	3	4	5	6	7	8	9	10	11	12	Final
Northern Ontario (Gathercole)	0	0	0	0	1	0	1	0	0	1	0	1	4
Ontario (Mann)	0	1	0	2	0	1	0	2	0	0	2	0	8

Sheet E	1	2	3	4	5	6	7	8	9	10	11	12	Final
Alberta (Shields)	3	1	0	3	2	0	3	0	3	1	1	1	18
Manitoba (Lerner)	0	0	3	0	0	1	0	3	0	0	0	0	7

=== Draw 3 ===
Tuesday, March 5 9:30 AM

Sheet A	1	2	3	4	5	6	7	8	9	10	11	12	Final
New Brunswick (Mix)	0	1	0	0	0	1	0	2	0	1	0	1	6
Saskatchewan (Richardson)	2	0	0	2	3	0	1	0	2	0	1	0	11

Sheet B	1	2	3	4	5	6	7	8	9	10	11	12	Final
Prince Edward Island (Cameron)	0	1	0	2	0	0	0	2	3	0	3	0	11
Manitoba (Lerner)	1	0	1	0	0	1	0	0	0	3	0	1	7

Sheet C	1	2	3	4	5	6	7	8	9	10	11	12	Final
Newfoundland (Pike)	0	0	2	0	1	0	0	1	0	0	1	0	5
Alberta (Shields)	0	1	0	2	0	2	1	0	0	2	0	1	9

Sheet D	1	2	3	4	5	6	7	8	9	10	11	12	Final
British Columbia (Harper)	0	0	2	0	1	0	0	1	0	0	1	0	5
Northern Ontario (Gathercole)	0	1	0	2	0	2	1	0	0	2	0	1	9

Sheet E	1	2	3	4	5	6	7	8	9	10	11	12	13	Final
Nova Scotia (Baird)	0	0	0	2	0	0	0	3	0	1	0	1	0	7
Ontario (Mann)	1	1	0	0	1	1	1	0	1	0	1	0	1	8

=== Draw 4 ===
Tuesday, March 5 3:00 PM

Sheet A	1	2	3	4	5	6	7	8	9	10	11	12	Final
Saskatchewan (Richardson)	0	1	0	4	0	2	0	0	0	1	0	2	10
Ontario (Mann)	1	0	1	0	1	0	0	1	2	0	2	0	8

Sheet B	1	2	3	4	5	6	7	8	9	10	11	12	Final
New Brunswick (Mix)	0	0	0	0	0	0	0	1	0	1	0	1	3
Alberta (Shields)	0	0	3	2	0	1	0	0	1	0	1	0	8

Sheet C	1	2	3	4	5	6	7	8	9	10	11	12	Final
Nova Scotia (Baird)	0	1	0	0	1	0	2	1	1	0	0	3	9
British Columbia (Harper)	1	0	1	1	0	1	0	0	0	1	0	0	5

Sheet D	1	2	3	4	5	6	7	8	9	10	11	12	Final
Prince Edward Island (Cameron)	2	1	1	0	3	1	0	1	1	0	2	1	13
Newfoundland (Pike)	0	0	0	1	0	0	1	0	0	0	0	0	2

Sheet E	1	2	3	4	5	6	7	8	9	10	11	12	Final
Quebec (Kent)	0	2	0	2	0	1	1	1	0	0	1	0	8
Northern Ontario (Gathercole)	1	0	2	0	2	0	0	0	0	2	0	2	9

=== Draw 5 ===
Wednesday, March 6 3:00 PM

Sheet A	1	2	3	4	5	6	7	8	9	10	11	12	Final
Saskatchewan (Richardson)	0	2	0	0	0	0	1	0	0	2	0	0	5
British Columbia (Harper)	1	0	0	2	0	0	0	2	2	0	0	1	8

Sheet B	1	2	3	4	5	6	7	8	9	10	11	12	Final
Ontario (Mann)	0	1	0	0	1	0	1	0	1	0	1	0	5
Alberta (Shields)	0	0	0	2	0	1	0	1	0	3	0	2	9

Sheet C	1	2	3	4	5	6	7	8	9	10	11	12	13	Final
Manitoba (Lerner)	0	1	0	0	5	0	2	0	2	0	0	1	0	11
Newfoundland (Pike)	2	0	0	3	0	2	0	1	0	1	2	0	1	12

Sheet D	1	2	3	4	5	6	7	8	9	10	11	12	Final
Quebec (Kent)	3	0	1	1	0	1	0	1	0	0	1	0	8
Nova Scotia (Baird)	0	2	0	0	5	0	1	0	1	1	0	1	11

Sheet E	1	2	3	4	5	6	7	8	9	10	11	12	13	Final
New Brunswick (Mix)	0	0	4	0	1	2	0	0	0	3	0	0	4	14
Prince Edward Island (Cameron)	1	1	0	4	0	0	2	1	0	0	0	1	0	10

=== Draw 6 ===
Wednesday, March 6 8:00 PM

Sheet A	1	2	3	4	5	6	7	8	9	10	11	12	Final
Quebec (Kent)	0	1	0	0	1	0	0	0	2	0	0	1	5
Saskatchewan (Richardson)	1	0	1	0	0	3	0	0	0	1	3	0	9

Sheet B	1	2	3	4	5	6	7	8	9	10	11	12	Final
British Columbia (Harper)	0	2	0	0	1	0	1	0	3	1	4	2	14
Alberta (Shields)	0	0	0	2	0	1	0	3	0	0	0	0	6

Sheet C	1	2	3	4	5	6	7	8	9	10	11	12	Final
New Brunswick (Mix)	2	2	3	0	2	0	2	1	0	1	0	1	14
Manitoba (Lerner)	0	0	0	1	0	1	0	0	1	0	2	0	5

Sheet D	1	2	3	4	5	6	7	8	9	10	11	12	Final
Prince Edward Island (Cameron)	2	0	1	0	1	0	2	0	0	3	0	1	10
Ontario (Mann)	0	1	0	1	0	1	0	2	1	0	3	0	9

Sheet E	1	2	3	4	5	6	7	8	9	10	11	12	Final
Nova Scotia (Baird)	1	1	0	0	3	0	0	0	0	1	0	0	6
Northern Ontario (Gathercole)	0	0	1	1	0	3	0	1	0	0	0	1	7

=== Draw 7 ===
Thursday, March 7 9:30 AM

Sheet A	1	2	3	4	5	6	7	8	9	10	11	12	Final
Northern Ontario (Gathercole)	0	0	1	1	0	0	3	0	0	0	1	0	6
Saskatchewan (Richardson)	3	1	0	0	0	1	0	0	1	1	0	1	8

Sheet B	1	2	3	4	5	6	7	8	9	10	11	12	Final
British Columbia (Harper)	1	1	0	0	1	0	2	0	2	0	0	4	11
Prince Edward Island (Cameron)	0	0	0	1	0	1	0	1	0	0	1	0	4

Sheet C	1	2	3	4	5	6	7	8	9	10	11	12	Final
Alberta (Shields)	0	1	0	0	2	0	0	2	0	0	2	1	8
Quebec (Kent)	1	0	2	1	0	1	0	0	0	1	0	0	6

Sheet D	1	2	3	4	5	6	7	8	9	10	11	12	Final
Newfoundland (Pike)	0	0	1	2	0	1	0	0	0	2	1	0	7
New Brunswick (Mix)	1	1	0	0	1	0	0	1	1	0	0	4	9

Sheet E	1	2	3	4	5	6	7	8	9	10	11	12	13	Final
Ontario (Mann)	0	0	0	4	0	1	0	1	0	1	0	1	1	9
Manitoba (Lerner)	0	2	0	0	3	0	1	0	0	0	2	0	0	8

=== Draw 8 ===
Thursday, March 7 3:00 PM

Sheet A	1	2	3	4	5	6	7	8	9	10	11	12	Final
Nova Scotia (Baird)	0	0	0	2	0	1	0	0	1	1	0	2	7
Saskatchewan (Richardson)	1	0	3	0	6	0	2	1	0	0	1	0	14

Sheet B	1	2	3	4	5	6	7	8	9	10	11	12	Final
Alberta (Shields)	0	0	0	6	0	0	0	2	1	0	1	0	10
Northern Ontario (Gathercole)	0	0	0	0	0	1	0	0	0	1	0	1	3

Sheet C	1	2	3	4	5	6	7	8	9	10	11	12	Final
British Columbia (Harper)	1	0	4	1	0	1	0	1	1	0	3	0	12
Manitoba (Lerner)	0	1	0	0	2	0	2	0	0	2	0	0	7

Sheet D	1	2	3	4	5	6	7	8	9	10	11	12	Final
Prince Edward Island (Cameron)	0	0	0	1	0	0	2	1	0	0	1	2	7
Quebec (Kent)	0	0	1	0	0	1	0	0	2	2	0	0	6

Sheet E	1	2	3	4	5	6	7	8	9	10	11	12	Final
Newfoundland (Pike)	1	1	0	1	0	1	1	1	0	3	0	0	9
Ontario (Mann)	0	0	3	0	1	0	0	0	2	0	2	2	10

=== Draw 9 ===
Thursday, March 7 8:00 PM

Sheet A	1	2	3	4	5	6	7	8	9	10	11	12	Final
Nova Scotia (Baird)	0	2	1	0	0	0	0	1	0	0	1	0	5
Alberta (Shields)	0	0	0	2	1	1	1	0	1	0	0	3	9

Sheet B	1	2	3	4	5	6	7	8	9	10	11	12	Final
British Columbia (Harper)	0	2	0	2	0	2	0	0	2	3	3	2	16
Newfoundland (Pike)	0	0	0	0	1	0	1	0	0	0	0	0	2

Sheet C	1	2	3	4	5	6	7	8	9	10	11	12	Final
Quebec (Kent)	0	2	0	0	0	0	1	0	0	0	0	2	5
Manitoba (Lerner)	2	0	0	2	2	1	0	1	1	4	2	0	15

Sheet D	1	2	3	4	5	6	7	8	9	10	11	12	Final
New Brunswick (Mix)	0	0	0	0	1	0	0	2	0	0	1	1	5
Ontario (Mann)	2	1	0	1	0	1	0	0	2	2	0	0	9

Sheet E	1	2	3	4	5	6	7	8	9	10	11	12	Final
Prince Edward Island (Cameron)	0	0	0	0	1	0	2	2	0	0	1	1	7
Northern Ontario (Gathercole)	1	0	1	3	0	3	0	0	1	1	0	0	10

=== Draw 10 ===
Friday, March 8 9:30 AM

Sheet A	1	2	3	4	5	6	7	8	9	10	11	12	Final
Saskatchewan (Richardson)	0	0	0	2	0	0	3	0	0	2	3	0	10
Alberta (Shields)	0	1	0	0	3	0	0	0	1	0	0	3	8

Player percentages
Alberta		Saskatchewan	
Fred Storey	65%	Mel Perry	73%
Ron Baker	80%	Sam Richardson	74%
Ron Northcott	83%	Arnold Richardson	74%
Jimmy Shields	70%	Ernie Richardson	78%
Total		Total	

Sheet B	1	2	3	4	5	6	7	8	9	10	11	12	Final
New Brunswick (Mix)	0	1	4	0	0	0	0	1	0	1	0	3	10
British Columbia (Harper)	4	0	0	2	2	0	1	0	2	0	2	0	13

Sheet C	1	2	3	4	5	6	7	8	9	10	11	12	Final
Manitoba (Lerner)	0	2	1	2	0	1	0	3	0	0	0	0	9
Northern Ontario (Gathercole)	0	0	0	0	2	0	1	0	1	1	1	1	7

Sheet D	1	2	3	4	5	6	7	8	9	10	11	12	Final
Prince Edward Island (Cameron)	1	0	0	0	0	3	0	0	0	0	2	0	6
Nova Scotia (Baird)	0	0	0	0	0	0	0	1	2	1	0	1	5

Sheet E	1	2	3	4	5	6	7	8	9	10	11	12	Final
Quebec (Kent)	0	3	0	2	0	1	0	3	0	2	0	2	13
Newfoundland (Pike)	1	0	1	0	1	0	1	0	1	0	3	0	8

=== Draw 11 ===
Friday, March 8 3:00 PM

Sheet A	1	2	3	4	5	6	7	8	9	10	11	12	Final
Saskatchewan (Richardson)	1	2	0	1	0	0	1	0	2	1	0	3	11
Prince Edward Island (Cameron)	0	0	1	0	0	1	0	1	0	0	1	0	4

Sheet B	1	2	3	4	5	6	7	8	9	10	11	12	Final
Northern Ontario (Gathercole)	1	2	0	0	1	3	2	0	3	1	0	0	13
Newfoundland (Pike)	0	0	1	1	0	0	0	2	0	0	0	1	5

Sheet C	1	2	3	4	5	6	7	8	9	10	11	12	Final
Ontario (Mann)	1	0	1	0	0	0	1	0	0	1	0	0	4
British Columbia (Harper)	0	1	0	1	0	0	0	1	1	0	0	1	5

Sheet D	1	2	3	4	5	6	7	8	9	10	11	12	Final
Manitoba (Lerner)	0	1	2	0	0	3	0	0	2	2	1	0	11
Nova Scotia (Baird)	1	0	0	3	0	0	0	1	0	0	0	4	9

Sheet E	1	2	3	4	5	6	7	8	9	10	11	12	Final
Quebec (Kent)	0	0	3	0	0	1	2	0	1	3	1	0	11
New Brunswick (Mix)	0	2	0	1	0	0	0	2	0	0	0	1	6
