= Jimmy Scott (curler) =

Scottish curler

- Curler

Team
- Curling club: Airth Bruce Castle & Dunsmore CC, Falkirk, Scotland
- Skip: Willie Young
- Third: John Pearson
- Second: Jimmy Scott
- Lead: Bobby Young

Curling career
- Member Association: Scotland
- World Championship: 1 (1959)
Medal record
Men's Curling
World championships
Silver medal – second place	1959 Scotland	Team

Jimmy Scott was the second man on the Airth Bruce Castle Dunsmore CC (from Falkirk, Scotland) during the inaugural Curling World Championships known as the 1959 Scotch Cup, where the Scottish team won silver medals. The team won The Rink Championship in 1950, 1953, 1954, 1955 and 1958.
