= 1962 Macdonald Brier =

Canadian men's curling championship

- Host city: Kitchener, Ontario
- Arena: Kitchener Memorial Auditorium
- Dates: March 5–10
- Attendance: 37,013
- Winner: Saskatchewan
- Curling club: Regina CC, Regina
- Skip: Ernie Richardson
- Third: Arnold Richardson
- Second: Garnet Richardson
- Lead: Wes Richardson
- Finalist: Alberta; Manitoba

The 1962 Macdonald Brier, the Canadian men's national curling championship, was held from March 5 to 10, 1962 at the Kitchener Memorial Auditorium in Kitchener, Ontario. A total of 37,013 fans attended the event.

Alberta, Manitoba, and Saskatchewan all finished round robin play with 8-2 records, necessitating a tiebreaker playoff between the three teams to determine the Brier championship. Team Saskatchewan, skipped by Ernie Richardson, ended up capturing the Brier Tankard by beating defending champion Hec Gervais and their Alberta rink in the final 14-7. Alberta earlier advanced to the final with an 8-7 victory over Manitoba in the semifinal. This was only the third time in Brier history in which a three-way tiebreaker determined the championship with the other instances being in 1928 and 1946.

This was Saskatchewan's fourth Brier championship and the third Brier won in four years by the Richardson rink after winning back-to-back Briers in 1959 and 1960. Richardson's rink would go on to compete in the 1962 Scotch Cup in Scotland, which they also won for the third time in four years.

== Event Summary ==
After the Thursday morning draw (Draw 7), there were seven teams all within a game of one another that had a shot at the championship. British Columbia, Ontario, and Saskatchewan were all sitting at 5-2 with Alberta, Manitoba, and Northern Ontario sitting at 4-2, and New Brunswick sitting at 4-3. With several of these teams having to play one another, it was appearing that this Brier would have one of the most exciting finishes of all time.

In the Thursday afternoon draw (Draw 8), Ontario defeated Northern Ontario 10-5, Alberta handed New Brunswick a 10-7 defeat, Saskatchewan beat winless Newfoundland 10-6, and Manitoba beat Quebec 9-6 while British Columbia draw a bye. Still after the Thursday afternoon draw, there were five teams with two losses while Northern Ontario and New Brunswick had three and four losses respectively.

The Thursday evening draw saw many blowouts along with a couple teams being eliminated. Manitoba demolished Prince Edward Island 15-2, Alberta easily defeated Quebec 14-5, and BC handing Ontario as costly 8-6 defeat. Northern Ontario was eliminated from contention as they were beat by Nova Scotia 10-7 and despite a 27-4 rout over Newfoundland, New Brunswick would be eliminated from Brier contention prior to the final day. With the final day of round robin play rising upon the curlers, there was a four-way tie for first place as Alberta, BC, Manitoba, and Saskatchewan were all 6-2 with Ontario sitting at 6-3 and having a bye on Friday morning.

The Friday morning draw saw all four 6-2 teams win their games and improve to 7-2 heading into the final draw. With BC and Manitoba having to play in the Friday afternoon draw, this meant that Ontario was eliminated from contention. With the BC and Manitoba match looming, it was highly likely that there would be a three-way tiebreaker playoff but also a possibility of the BC/Manitoba winner winning the Brier if both Alberta and Saskatchewan both slipped up against Northern Ontario and Quebec respectively.

Alberta would make sure that there would be at least one tiebreaker game on Friday evening as they beat a reeling Northern Ontario team handily 14-9. Meanwhile Saskatchewan would make sure that the first three-way tiebreaker since 1946 would happen as they beat Quebec 10-8. The Manitoba and BC matchup went back-and-forth during the first half of play as the game was tied at 4 after six ends. However, Manitoba scored three in the seventh and two in the ninth (with BC scoring one in the eighth) to put the game out of reach and eventually win 10-7 joining both Alberta and Saskatchewan in the tiebreaker playoff. In the subsequent draw, Alberta would draw Manitoba in the semifinal on Friday evening while Saskatchewan drew a bye into the final on Saturday morning.

The semifinal game between Alberta and Manitoba on Friday evening proved to be as good as advertised. Alberta would hold the lead for the majority of the game including a 6-3 lead after the seventh end. But Ontario would mount a rally in the next four ends to tie the game at 7 heading into the final end. But Alberta would score one in the final end to win 8-7 and advance to the Saturday morning final against Saskatchewan.

The championship game on Saturday morning pitted two teams who had won the last three Brier Tankards with defending champion Hec Gervais of Alberta and two-time winner Ernie Richardson of Saskatchewan. Gervais was attempting to be the third skip in a row to win back-to-back Briers while Richardson was looking for his third Brier in the last four years. The championship proved to be a blowout as Saskatchewan dominated from the start with three in the first end. Alberta was not able to come back from the early deficit and would eventually trail 8-2 after the fifth end, which proved to be too much. Saskatchewan would roll to a 14-7 victory giving the Richardson rink not only their third Brier in four years, but also represent Canada in the upcoming 1962 Scotch Cup.

== Teams ==
The teams are listed as follows:

Alberta	British Columbia	Manitoba	New Brunswick
Alberta Avenue CC, Edmonton Skip: Hec Gervais; Third: Ron Anton; Second: Ray Werner; Lead: Wally Ursuliak	Trail CC, Trail Skip: Reg Stone; Third: Roy Stone; Second: Frenchy D'Amour; Lead: Hunt McKay	Strathcona CC, Winnipeg Skip: Norm Houck; Third: Jim Ursel; Second: Morley Handford; Lead: Ross Murdock	Moncton CA, Moncton Skip: Harold Mabey Sr. Third: Harold Mabey Jr. Second: Harold Keith; Lead: Robert Puddester
Newfoundland	Northern Ontario	Nova Scotia	Ontario
St. John's CC, St. John's Skip: George Giannou; Third: Frederick Colbourne; Second: George MacCharles; Lead: John Taite	Kenora CC, Kenora Skip: Ronald Redding; Third: John Kostick; Second: Alan Hansen; Lead: Gordon Peterson	Dartmouth CC, Dartmouth Skip: James Florian; Third: Peter Hope; Second: Kenneth Bell; Lead: Donald Stanhope	Tam-Heather CC, Agincourt Skip: Bayne Secord; Third: Vernon Larsen; Second: Russell Lindberg; Lead: David McDonough
Prince Edward Island	Quebec	Saskatchewan
Charlottetown CC, Charlottetown Skip: Arthur Burke; Third: Alan Smith; Second: Bob Dillon; Lead: Wayne Rhodenizer	Lachine CC, Lachine Skip: William Armstrong; Third: Gordon Cape; Second: Garth Ruiter; Lead: James Wilson	Regina CC, Regina Skip: Ernie Richardson; Third: Arnold Richardson; Second: Garnet Richardson; Lead: Wes Richardson

== Round-robin standings ==
Key
Teams to Tiebreaker Playoff

Province	Skip	W	L	PF	PA
Saskatchewan	Ernie Richardson	8	2	96	74
Alberta	Hec Gervais	8	2	106	81
Manitoba	Norm Houck	8	2	92	61
British Columbia	Reg Stone	7	3	94	76
Ontario	Bayne Secord	6	4	96	70
New Brunswick	Harold Mabey Sr.	5	5	111	82
Nova Scotia	James Florian	5	5	87	88
Northern Ontario	Ronald Redding	4	6	84	111
Quebec	William Armstrong	3	7	85	100
Prince Edward Island	Arthur Burke	1	9	77	120
Newfoundland	George Giannou	0	10	64	129

== Round-robin results ==
All draw times are listed in Eastern Time (UTC-05:00)

=== Draw 1 ===
Monday, March 5 3:00 PM

Sheet A	1	2	3	4	5	6	7	8	9	10	11	12	Final
Northern Ontario (Redding)	0	1	0	1	1	0	1	0	1	4	0	4	13
Newfoundland (Giannou)	1	0	2	0	0	2	0	1	0	0	1	0	7

Sheet B	1	2	3	4	5	6	7	8	9	10	11	12	Final
Prince Edward Island (Burke)	1	0	0	0	1	0	1	0	0	2	0	2	7
Saskatchewan (Richardson)	0	2	2	1	0	3	0	1	1	0	1	0	11

Sheet C	1	2	3	4	5	6	7	8	9	10	11	12	Final
New Brunswick (Mabey)	0	0	0	0	0	1	3	2	2	1	0	2	11
Quebec (Armstrong)	0	3	1	1	3	0	0	0	0	0	1	0	9

Sheet D	1	2	3	4	5	6	7	8	9	10	11	12	Final
Alberta (Gervais)	1	0	2	0	2	0	0	3	0	2	0	0	10
British Columbia (Stone)	0	1	0	2	0	1	1	0	1	0	2	1	9

Sheet E	1	2	3	4	5	6	7	8	9	10	11	12	13	Final
Ontario (Secord)	0	1	0	1	2	0	0	0	1	0	0	1	0	6
Manitoba (Houck)	1	0	1	0	0	2	0	1	0	0	1	0	1	7

=== Draw 2 ===
Monday, March 5 8:00 PM

Sheet A	1	2	3	4	5	6	7	8	9	10	11	12	Final
Newfoundland (Giannou)	0	0	0	1	0	1	1	0	2	0	0	0	5
British Columbia (Stone)	2	1	1	0	1	0	0	1	0	1	3	1	11

Sheet B	1	2	3	4	5	6	7	8	9	10	11	12	Final
Northern Ontario (Redding)	0	0	0	0	1	0	1	0	0	1	0	1	4
Saskatchewan (Richardson)	3	1	2	1	0	2	0	2	2	0	1	0	14

Sheet C	1	2	3	4	5	6	7	8	9	10	11	12	Final
Nova Scotia (Florian)	0	0	2	0	2	0	0	0	1	0	1	0	6
Manitoba (Houck)	0	1	0	1	0	2	2	1	0	2	0	1	10

Sheet D	1	2	3	4	5	6	7	8	9	10	11	12	Final
Alberta (Gervais)	2	0	0	0	2	0	0	1	0	0	2	0	7
Ontario (Secord)	0	1	0	1	0	1	1	0	1	1	0	2	8

Sheet E	1	2	3	4	5	6	7	8	9	10	11	12	Final
New Brunswick (Mabey)	3	0	3	0	4	0	3	0	2	0	2	0	17
Prince Edward Island (Burke)	0	1	0	2	0	1	0	2	0	1	0	1	8

=== Draw 3 ===
Tuesday, March 6 9:30 AM

Sheet A	1	2	3	4	5	6	7	8	9	10	11	12	Final
Newfoundland (Giannou)	0	0	0	1	1	0	0	0	0	1	0	1	4
Ontario (Secord)	4	1	3	0	0	1	1	2	2	0	1	0	15

Sheet B	1	2	3	4	5	6	7	8	9	10	11	12	Final
British Columbia (Stone)	1	0	1	0	3	1	0	1	2	3	0	1	13
Saskatchewan (Richardson)	0	3	0	2	0	0	1	0	0	0	2	0	8

Sheet C	1	2	3	4	5	6	7	8	9	10	11	12	Final
Northern Ontario (Redding)	0	0	3	0	0	1	0	0	0	0	0	1	5
New Brunswick (Mabey)	1	1	0	3	3	0	2	3	3	1	0	0	17

Sheet D	1	2	3	4	5	6	7	8	9	10	11	12	13	Final
Quebec (Armstrong)	3	1	0	1	0	1	0	2	0	1	0	0	3	12
Prince Edward Island (Burke)	0	0	1	0	1	0	1	0	1	0	4	1	0	9

Sheet E	1	2	3	4	5	6	7	8	9	10	11	12	Final
Nova Scotia (Florian)	0	2	2	0	0	0	1	0	1	1	0	1	8
Alberta (Gervais)	1	0	0	3	1	0	0	2	0	0	2	0	9

=== Draw 4 ===
Tuesday, March 6 3:00 PM

Sheet A	1	2	3	4	5	6	7	8	9	10	11	12	Final
Saskatchewan (Richardson)	0	0	1	0	3	0	2	0	2	2	1	2	13
Ontario (Secord)	0	2	0	1	0	1	0	3	0	0	0	0	7

Sheet B	1	2	3	4	5	6	7	8	9	10	11	12	Final
Quebec (Armstrong)	0	0	1	2	0	3	0	0	3	0	0	1	10
Northern Ontario (Redding)	2	1	0	0	0	0	3	2	0	1	4	0	13

Sheet C	1	2	3	4	5	6	7	8	9	10	11	12	13	Final
Manitoba (Houck)	0	1	2	0	1	0	2	0	0	1	0	2	0	9
Alberta (Gervais)	1	0	0	2	0	3	0	0	1	0	2	0	2	11

Sheet D	1	2	3	4	5	6	7	8	9	10	11	12	13	Final
British Columbia (Stone)	1	0	1	0	3	0	1	0	2	0	0	1	2	11
New Brunswick (Mabey)	0	1	0	1	0	2	0	3	0	1	1	0	0	9

Sheet E	1	2	3	4	5	6	7	8	9	10	11	12	Final
Newfoundland (Giannou)	3	0	1	0	1	0	0	1	0	1	0	2	9
Nova Scotia (Florian)	0	2	0	3	0	1	1	0	3	0	1	0	11

=== Draw 5 ===
Wednesday, March 7 3:00 PM

Sheet A	1	2	3	4	5	6	7	8	9	10	11	12	Final
Manitoba (Houck)	4	1	0	2	1	0	0	1	0	1	0	0	10
Newfoundland (Giannou)	0	0	1	0	0	1	1	0	1	0	1	0	5

Sheet B	1	2	3	4	5	6	7	8	9	10	11	12	Final
Ontario (Secord)	2	3	1	1	0	2	0	0	1	0	1	2	13
New Brunswick (Mabey)	0	0	0	0	1	0	1	0	0	1	0	0	3

Sheet C	1	2	3	4	5	6	7	8	9	10	11	12	Final
British Columbia (Stone)	0	1	1	0	0	1	0	3	0	2	0	1	9
Quebec (Armstrong)	1	0	0	0	1	0	1	0	1	0	1	0	5

Sheet D	1	2	3	4	5	6	7	8	9	10	11	12	Final
Prince Edward Island (Burke)	1	2	0	0	2	0	0	2	0	2	0	1	10
Northern Ontario (Redding)	0	0	3	2	0	3	1	0	2	0	0	0	11

Sheet E	1	2	3	4	5	6	7	8	9	10	11	12	Final
Saskatchewan (Richardson)	0	0	2	0	2	0	0	2	0	0	0	0	6
Nova Scotia (Florian)	1	1	0	1	0	0	2	0	3	0	2	1	11

=== Draw 6 ===
Wednesday, March 7 8:00 PM

Sheet A	1	2	3	4	5	6	7	8	9	10	11	12	Final
Prince Edward Island (Burke)	1	0	1	0	1	0	0	2	1	1	1	0	8
British Columbia (Stone)	0	2	0	2	0	2	0	0	0	0	0	3	9

Sheet B	1	2	3	4	5	6	7	8	9	10	11	12	Final
Saskatchewan (Richardson)	0	1	0	0	2	0	0	0	1	0	0	3	7
Manitoba (Houck)	1	0	1	0	0	0	0	1	0	2	0	0	5

Sheet C	1	2	3	4	5	6	7	8	9	10	11	12	Final
Alberta (Gervais)	3	0	0	0	3	0	2	0	0	2	0	X	10
Newfoundland (Giannou)	0	1	1	1	0	1	0	2	1	0	1	X	8

Sheet D	1	2	3	4	5	6	7	8	9	10	11	12	Final
New Brunswick (Mabey)	0	3	0	2	0	0	2	1	1	0	2	0	11
Nova Scotia (Florian)	0	0	1	0	2	0	0	0	0	2	0	2	7

Sheet E	1	2	3	4	5	6	7	8	9	10	11	12	Final
Ontario (Secord)	1	0	3	0	0	0	4	0	1	0	0	2	11
Quebec (Armstrong)	0	1	0	1	2	1	0	1	0	1	1	0	8

=== Draw 7 ===
Thursday, March 8 9:30 AM

Sheet A	1	2	3	4	5	6	7	8	9	10	11	12	Final
Alberta (Gervais)	0	0	1	0	0	2	1	1	0	3	0	0	8
Saskatchewan (Richardson)	1	1	0	2	2	0	0	0	1	0	1	1	9

Sheet B	1	2	3	4	5	6	7	8	9	10	11	12	Final
Nova Scotia (Florian)	0	0	1	0	1	0	1	0	2	0	0	1	6
Quebec (Armstrong)	0	2	0	3	0	1	0	2	0	2	1	0	11

Sheet C	1	2	3	4	5	6	7	8	9	10	11	12	Final
Ontario (Secord)	1	0	3	1	1	0	1	0	1	1	0	3	12
Prince Edward Island (Burke)	0	2	0	0	0	1	0	1	0	0	0	0	4

Sheet D	1	2	3	4	5	6	7	8	9	10	11	12	13	Final
Northern Ontario (Redding)	2	0	0	1	0	0	1	0	2	1	0	2	1	10
British Columbia (Stone)	0	3	0	0	0	2	0	3	0	0	1	0	0	9

Sheet E	1	2	3	4	5	6	7	8	9	10	11	12	Final
New Brunswick (Mabey)	0	1	0	1	0	0	0	1	0	1	0	0	4
Manitoba (Houck)	1	0	1	0	2	0	0	0	2	0	0	1	7

=== Draw 8 ===
Thursday, March 8 3:00 PM

Sheet A	1	2	3	4	5	6	7	8	9	10	11	12	Final
Newfoundland (Giannou)	0	1	0	0	1	0	0	1	0	1	0	2	6
Saskatchewan (Richardson)	1	0	0	3	0	3	0	0	2	0	1	0	10

Sheet B	1	2	3	4	5	6	7	8	9	10	11	12	Final
Northern Ontario (Redding)	1	0	0	1	0	1	0	0	1	0	1	0	5
Ontario (Secord)	0	1	2	0	1	0	2	3	0	1	0	0	10

Sheet C	1	2	3	4	5	6	7	8	9	10	11	12	Final
Quebec (Armstrong)	1	0	1	0	1	1	0	1	0	1	0	0	6
Manitoba (Houck)	0	1	0	1	0	0	2	0	2	0	1	2	9

Sheet D	1	2	3	4	5	6	7	8	9	10	11	12	Final
New Brunswick (Mabey)	2	0	2	0	1	0	0	1	0	0	1	0	7
Alberta (Gervais)	0	1	0	1	0	3	0	0	3	1	0	1	10

Sheet E	1	2	3	4	5	6	7	8	9	10	11	12	Final
Nova Scotia (Florian)	0	0	1	0	2	0	2	1	0	0	0	6	12
Prince Edward Island (Burke)	0	1	0	2	0	2	0	0	2	1	1	0	9

=== Draw 9 ===
Thursday, March 8 8:00 PM

Sheet A	1	2	3	4	5	6	7	8	9	10	11	12	Final
Manitoba (Houck)	1	1	1	1	4	0	2	2	0	2	1	0	15
Prince Edward Island (Burke)	0	0	0	0	0	0	0	0	1	0	0	1	2

Sheet B	1	2	3	4	5	6	7	8	9	10	11	12	Final
Quebec (Armstrong)	0	0	0	0	0	0	0	2	0	0	0	3	5
Alberta (Gervais)	2	1	0	2	3	1	1	0	0	1	3	0	14

Sheet C	1	2	3	4	5	6	7	8	9	10	11	12	Final
Nova Scotia (Florian)	0	2	0	1	0	2	1	2	0	1	0	1	10
Northern Ontario (Redding)	0	0	3	0	1	0	0	0	1	0	2	0	7

Sheet D	1	2	3	4	5	6	7	8	9	10	11	12	Final
Newfoundland (Giannou)	0	1	0	0	2	0	1	0	0	0	0	0	4
New Brunswick (Mabey)	1	0	3	2	0	6	0	3	5	3	2	2	27

Sheet E	1	2	3	4	5	6	7	8	9	10	11	12	13	Final
British Columbia (Stone)	1	0	0	2	0	1	0	0	1	1	0	0	2	8
Ontario (Secord)	0	2	0	0	1	0	0	1	0	0	1	1	0	6

=== Draw 10 ===
Friday, March 9 9:30 AM

Sheet A	1	2	3	4	5	6	7	8	9	10	11	12	Final
Manitoba (Houck)	1	0	2	0	2	0	1	0	0	1	0	3	10
Northern Ontario (Redding)	0	0	0	1	0	2	0	2	1	0	1	0	7

Sheet B	1	2	3	4	5	6	7	8	9	10	11	12	Final
Prince Edward Island (Burke)	0	0	2	1	0	2	1	0	1	0	2	0	9
Alberta (Gervais)	2	0	0	0	3	0	0	3	0	4	0	1	13

Sheet C	1	2	3	4	5	6	7	8	9	10	11	12	Final
Saskatchewan (Richardson)	1	0	0	1	0	2	1	0	0	0	3	0	8
New Brunswick (Mabey)	0	0	1	0	3	0	0	1	0	0	0	0	5

Sheet D	1	2	3	4	5	6	7	8	9	10	11	12	Final
British Columbia (Stone)	2	1	0	1	0	1	0	1	0	1	0	1	8
Nova Scotia (Florian)	0	0	1	0	1	0	1	0	1	0	1	0	5

Sheet E	1	2	3	4	5	6	7	8	9	10	11	12	Final
Quebec (Armstrong)	0	4	0	2	0	2	0	0	2	0	0	1	11
Newfoundland (Giannou)	2	0	1	0	1	0	1	1	0	1	1	0	8

=== Draw 11 ===
Friday, March 9 3:00 PM

Sheet A	1	2	3	4	5	6	7	8	9	10	11	12	Final
Manitoba (Houck)	0	1	0	1	2	0	3	0	2	0	1	0	10
British Columbia (Stone)	1	0	1	0	0	2	0	1	0	1	0	1	7

Sheet B	1	2	3	4	5	6	7	8	9	10	11	12	Final
Prince Edward Island (Burke)	1	0	2	0	1	0	4	1	1	1	0	0	11
Newfoundland (Giannou)	0	1	0	1	0	1	0	0	0	0	2	3	8

Sheet C	1	2	3	4	5	6	7	8	9	10	11	12	Final
Saskatchewan (Richardson)	0	0	1	0	2	1	0	2	2	0	2	0	10
Quebec (Armstrong)	0	3	0	1	0	0	1	0	0	1	0	2	8

Sheet D	1	2	3	4	5	6	7	8	9	10	11	12	Final
Ontario (Secord)	0	3	0	1	2	0	1	0	0	1	0	0	8
Nova Scotia (Florian)	4	0	2	0	0	1	0	2	0	0	1	1	11

Sheet E	1	2	3	4	5	6	7	8	9	10	11	12	Final
Alberta (Gervais)	0	4	0	1	0	2	0	3	0	2	2	0	14
Northern Ontario (Redding)	1	0	1	0	1	0	1	0	2	0	0	3	9

== Playoff ==
Semifinal		Final
		Saskatchewan	14
Alberta	8	Alberta	7
Manitoba	7

=== Semifinal ===
Friday, March 9 8:00 PM

Sheet C	1	2	3	4	5	6	7	8	9	10	11	12	Final
Alberta (Gervais)	2	0	0	0	2	0	2	0	1	0	0	1	8
Manitoba (Houck)	0	0	1	1	0	1	0	2	0	1	1	0	7

=== Final ===
Saturday, March 10 9:30 AM

Sheet C	1	2	3	4	5	6	7	8	9	10	11	12	Final
Saskatchewan (Richardson)	3	0	2	0	3	0	1	0	2	0	3	0	14
Alberta (Gervais)	0	1	0	1	0	1	0	1	0	1	0	2	7
