= Edinburgh International =

The Edinburgh International is an annual bonspiel, or curling tournament, that takes place in late November at the Murrayfield Curling Club in Edinburgh, Scotland. The tournament is held in a round robin format.

== History ==
The tournament was started in 1922 as the Worlds Curling Championship, an open competition between Scottish curlers held at the Haymarket Ice Rink. The tournament was renamed the Edinburgh International Curling Championship in 1975 in order for the International Curling Federation to reserve the name "World Curling Championship" for the Air Canada Silver Broom, the men's world curling championship at the time. It became an invitational tournament, inviting the semifinalists of the same year's World Championships, and moved venues to the Murrayfield Curling Rink. A period of decreased interest in the tournament led to the event's relegation from a highly respected international tournament to a domestic circuit tournament. In 2007, the tournament became part of the World Curling Tour and the Curling Champions Tour, the European portion of the World Curling Tour, and was slotted to be held in late November. The event was dropped from the tour after 2016, and currently only consists of a senior men's and senior women's tournament.

== Past champions ==
Only skip's name is displayed before 1952. Team line-up order: skip, third, second, lead.

Year	Winning team	Runner up team	Purse (GBP)
Worlds Curling Championship
1922	W K Jackson		
1923	W C Johnstone		
1924	(Scotland) Robin Welsh		
1925	H McCall		
1926	W K Jackson		
1927	(Scotland) Thomas Murray		
1928	E Cowper		
1929	W K Jackson		
1930	E Cowper		
1931	L Jackson		
1932	W K Jackson		
1933	J Hay		
1934	W K Jackson		
1935	A W Keanie		
1936	H Wakelin		
1937	H Wakelin		
1938	M Mather		
Not held 1939–1946
1947	J Robertson		
1948	W Scobie		
1949	J Walker		
1950	(Scotland) Willie Young		
1951	J McWhirter		
1952	(Scotland) Willie Young, Robert Young (?), John B. Pearson, J Scott		
1953	(Scotland) Willie Young, John B. Pearson, J Scott, Robert Young		
1954	(Scotland) James Sanderson, J Cooper, A Allison, R Moffat		
1955	J Hamilton, W Archibald, G Baxter, J Leadbetter		
1956	J Neilson, J Lamb, W Sommerville, W Macgregor		
1957	(Scotland) Willie Young, John B. Pearson, J Scott, Robert Young		
1958	R T Grierson, J Agnew, J McColm, S McColm		
1959	(Scotland) William Henderson, L Tod, H Hay, N Tod		
1960	(Scotland) Willie Young, John B. Pearson, Robert Young, J Young		
1961	R B Dick, R B Dick Jnr, T L Morrison, A D Blair		
1962	J Sellar, A M Sellar, J Young Jnr, A G Harvey		
1963	J Neilson, J Lamb, W Sommerville, J Gilchrist		
1964	J Aitken, W Sanderson, W Carsewell, A Graham		
1965	(Scotland) Alex F. Torrance, Alex A. Torrance, Robert Kirkland, James Waddell		
1966	(Canada) Gerry McLaughlin, Joe Klein, Ron Taylor, Don McLeod		
1967	(Scotland) Alex F. Torrance, Alex A. Torrance, Robert Kirkland, James Waddell		
1968	(Scotland) Alex F. Torrance, Alex A. Torrance, Robert Kirkland, James Waddell		
1969	(Scotland) William Muirhead, George Haggart, Derek Scott, Alex Young		
1970	(Scotland) Willie Young, H Colville, W Kerr, J Young		
1971	J Hutchinson, E Johnston, M Brown, J Prentice		
1972	James C. Sanderson, Willie Sanderson, Iain Baxter, Colin Baxter		
1973	James C. Sanderson, Willie Sanderson, Iain Baxter, Colin Baxter		
1974	J Whiteford, R Whiteford, P Aitken, D Adam		
Edinburgh International Curling Championships
1975	J C Bryson, J Caldwell, G Connell, J Brown		
1976	(Scotland) William Muirhead, Derek Scott, Len Dudman, Roy Sinclair		
1977	(Switzerland) Peter Attinger, Bernhard Attinger, Mattias Neuenschwander, Ruedi Attinger		
1978	Ken J. Horton, Willie Jamieson, Keith Douglas, S Cullen		
1979	(Scotland) Willie Jamieson, R W Kelly, Keith Douglas, S Cullen		
1980	(Scotland) Colin Hamilton, W M Dick, David Ramsay, L Pretsel		
1981	Graeme P Adam, Ken J. Horton, Robert A Cowan, Robin G Copland		
1982	Graeme P Adam, Ken J. Horton, Andrew McQuistin, Robert A Cowan		
1983	(Scotland) Colin Hamilton, James C. Sanderson, W M Dick, S Cobb		
1984	Graeme P Adam, Ken J. Horton, Grant McPherson, Robert Wilson		
1985	(Scotland) Gordon Muirhead, R W Kelly, K Graham, R G Copland		
1986	Peter Wilson, Norman R Brown, Hugh Aitken, Roger McIntyre		
1987	Grant McPherson, R Gray, David Howie, Robert Wilson		
1988	(Norway) Eigil Ramsfjell, Sjur Loen, Dagfinn Loen, Morten Skaug		
1989	Grant McPherson, Gordon Muirhead, R W Kelly, Robert Wilson		
1990	K Prentice, J Muir, R Aitken, B Stewart		
1991	(Scotland) Colin Hamilton, R W Kelly, V Moran, T Dodds		
1992	(Scotland) Colin Hamilton, Ms V Gumley, T Dodds, Ms E Butler		
1993	(Scotland) Mike Hay, Ms K Hay, Grant McPherson, Ms S Harvey		
1994	D Howden, T Manuel, W Clark, L Summers		
1995	(Scotland) Warwick Smith, David Smith, Peter Smith, David Hay		
1996	(Norway) Eigil Ramsfjell, Jan Thoresen, Anthon Grimsmo, Tore Torvbråten		
1997	(Scotland) Moray Combe, A Hannah, R Dickson, S Stewart		
1998	(Scotland) Warwick Smith, Hammy C McMillan, Ewan MacDonald, Ross Hepburn		
1999	(Denmark) Ulrik Schmidt, Lasse Lavrsen, B Hansen, C Svengaard		
2000	(Scotland) David Murdoch, N Murdoch, G McKay, S Reid		
2001	(Scotland) Colin Hamilton, Brian Binnie, David Ramsay, G Craik		
2002	(Scotland) Warwick Smith, Ewan MacDonald, A Smith, Peter Loudon		
2003	(Scotland) David Murdoch, Craig Wilson, Neil Murdoch, Euan Byers		
2004	(Scotland) Colin Hamilton, G Patrick, S Murphy, J Boyd		
2005	(Scotland) David Edwards, P Westwood, Ross Paterson, S Gilmour		
2006	(Scotland) Peter Loudon, Graeme Connal, David Hay, M Fraser		
2007	A Smith, N McArthur, D Reid, M Fraser		
2008	(Germany) Andy Kapp, Andreas Lang, Holger Höhne, Andreas Kempf	(Sweden) Göran Carlsson	12,500
2009	(Scotland) David Murdoch, Ewan MacDonald, Peter Smith (curler), Euan Byers	(Scotland) Peter Loudon	10,000
2010	(Scotland) Graham Shaw, Brian Binnie, Richard Goldie, Robin Niven	(Scotland) Hammy McMillan	10,000
2011	(Scotland) Tom Brewster, Greg Drummond, Scott Andrews, Michael Goodfellow	(Scotland) Sandy Reid	10,000
2012	(Scotland) Tom Brewster, Greg Drummond, Scott Andrews, Michael Goodfellow	(Germany) John Jahr	10,000
2013	(Scotland) David Edwards, John Penny, Scott Macleod, Colin Campbell	(Scotland) Ross McCleary	10,000
2014	(Finland) Aku Kauste, Pauli Jäämies, Leo Mäkelä, Janne Pitko	(Czech Republic) David Šik	10,000
2015	(Scotland) Kyle Smith, Thomas Muirhead, Kyle Waddell, Cammy Smith	(Netherlands) Jaap van Dorp	10,000
2016	(Czech Republic) Karel Kubeska, Jiri Candra, Martin Jurík, Lukáš Klíma	(Scotland) Bruce Mouat	10,300
