= Garnet Richardson =

Canadian curler (1933–2016)

Sam Richardson
- Curler
- Born: November 6, 1933; Stoughton, Saskatchewan, Canada
- Died: January 21, 2016 (aged 82); Regina, Saskatchewan, Canada

Curling career
- Brier: 5 (1959, 1960, 1962, 1963, 1964)
- World Championship: 4 (1959, 1960, 1962, 1963)
Medal record
Men's Curling
Representing Canada
World Championships
Gold medal – first place	1959 Scotland	Team
Gold medal – first place	1960 Scotland	Team
Gold medal – first place	1962 Scotland	Team
Gold medal – first place	1963 Perth	Team
Representing Saskatchewan
Macdonald Brier
Gold medal – first place	1959 Quebec City
Gold medal – first place	1960 Fort William
Gold medal – first place	1962 Kitchener
Gold medal – first place	1963 Brandon
Silver medal – second place	1964 Charlottetown

Garnet Samuel Richardson SOM (November 6, 1933 – January 21, 2016) was a Canadian curler. He played second for the "World famous Richardsons", which won four Briers and four World Curling Championships.

== Career ==
The Richardson team consisted of Garnet, his brother and skip Ernie, and their two cousins Arnold and Wes. They won the 1959, 1960, 1962 and 1963 Briers as well as their corresponding Scotch Cups (the World Championship at the time). They would play in another Brier in 1964, where they were runners up to Lyall Dagg's British Columbia team. In 1973, Richardson won the Saskatchewan Mixed title with Ev Krahn, Glen Hall and Elsie Hunter, finishing second at the Canadian Mixed Curling Championship that year.

At the 1976 Macdonald Brier, which was held in Richardson's hometown of Regina, Saskatchewan, Richardson served as the driver for the winning Newfoundland team, skipped by Jack MacDuff. In addition to driving the team, Richardson served as the "unofficial coach" of the rink. Also at the '76 Brier, Richardson had to fill in for former Prime Minister John Diefenbaker, who was due to be a guest speaker at the event. Since then, Richardson made a career of making speeches as a guest speaker. Richardson would also coach the Bob Ellert team at the 1981 Labatt Brier and the Garry Bryden team at the 1984 Labatt Brier.

In 2005, Richardson was awarded with the Saskatchewan Order of Merit and he was made the Honorary Chair of the 2006 Tim Hortons Brier, also held in Regina. He is also a member of the Canadian Sports Hall of Fame, the Canadian Curling Hall of Fame and the Saskatchewan Sports Hall of Fame.

== Personal life ==
Richardson was born in Stoughton, Saskatchewan, and moved to Regina in 1945. He attended Davin Elementary School and Balfour Collegiate. He trained as a carpenter at the Saskatchewan Institute of Applied Science and Technology in Moose Jaw, Saskatchewan. After working for 35 years as a carpenter, he moved on to become a realtor, for Monarch Homes, Block Brothers, and finally for the Sutton Group. Richardson died on January 21, 2016, in Regina of complications from a rare form of Parkinson's disease. He was married to Kathleen (Kay) Richardson, and had two children.
