= Sandy Anderson (curler) =

Scottish curler

- Curler

Curling career
- Member Association: Scotland
- World Championship: 1 (1962)
Medal record
Men's Curling
World championships
Bronze medal – third place	1962 Scotland	Team
Scottish Men's Championship
Gold medal – first place	1962

Sandy Anderson was a Scottish curler. He was the second man on the team that represented Scotland at the 1962 Scotch Cup, the world men's curling championship at the time. He and the team of skip Willie Young, third John Pearson, and lead Bobby Young curled out of the Airth Bruce Castle and Dunmore Curling Club in Falkirk, Scotland.
