= Bruce Hudson (curler) =

Canadian curler

Medal record

Curling

Representing Manitoba

Macdonald Brier
Silver medal – second place	1967 Ottawa	
Bronze medal – third place	1964 Charlottetown	

Bruce Maclean Hudson (November 13, 1928 – October 8, 2016) was a Canadian curler.

Hudson won two provincial men's championships as a skip, in 1964 and 1967. In 1964, he and teammates Harvey Mazinke, Ken Little and Harold Martel represented Manitoba at that year's Brier. The team would finish in third place overall, with a 7-3 record. Hudson represented Manitoba again at the 1967 Macdonald Brier, with teammates Dick Wright, Gordon Little and Martel. The team would finish in a tie for second place, with an 8-2 record. In 1981, Hudson won a provincial senior men's title with teammates Don McNeill, Jim Robertson and Ken Beatty.

== Personal life ==
Hudson was the son of two-time Brier champion Gordon Hudson. He was a long-time member of the Knox United Church. In addition to his curling career, he was also an accomplished golfer and baseball player. He was inducted into the Manitoba Curling Hall of Fame in 1994 and the Manitoba Baseball Hall of Fame in 2003. He was married and had four children and was employed by the province of Manitoba.
