= 1964 Macdonald Brier =

Canadian men's curling championship

- Host city: Charlottetown, Prince Edward Island
- Arena: Charlottetown Forum
- Dates: March 2–6
- Attendance: 13,573
- Winner: British Columbia
- Curling club: Vancouver CC, Vancouver
- Skip: Lyall Dagg
- Third: Leo Hebert
- Second: Fred Britton
- Lead: Barry Naimark

The 1964 Macdonald Brier, the Canadian men's national curling championship, was held from March 4 to 8, 1964 at the Charlottetown Forum in Charlottetown, Prince Edward Island. A total of 13,573 fans attended the event, which was the smallest attended Brier since 1952. To date, this is the only time that PEI has hosted a Brier.

Team British Columbia, skipped by Lyall Dagg, captured the Brier Tankard by finishing round robin play with a 9–1 record. This was the second time in which BC had won the Brier, with their previous championship having been in 1948.

Dagg and his rink would go onto represent Canada in the 1964 Scotch Cup, which they won.

== Teams ==
The teams are listed as follows:

| Alberta | British Columbia | Manitoba | New Brunswick |
|---|---|---|---|
| Calgary CC, Calgary Skip: Ron Northcott; Third: Mike Chernoff; Second: Ronald Baker; Lead: Fred Storey | Vancouver CC, Vancouver Skip: Lyall Dagg; Third: Leo Hebert; Second: Fred Britton; Lead: Barry Naimark | Strathcona CC, Winnipeg Skip: Bruce Hudson; Third: Harvey Mazinke; Second: Gordon Little; Lead: Harold Martel | Moncton CA, Moncton Fourth: Harold Mabey Jr. Third: David Silliphant; Second: Harold Keith; Skip: Harold Mabey Sr. |
| Newfoundland | Northern Ontario | Nova Scotia | Ontario |
| St. John's CC, St. John's Skip: Edward Pedley; Third: George Giannou; Second: John Taite; Lead: William O'Reilly | Kirkland Lake CC, Kirkland Lake Skip: Jack Polyblank; Third: Frank Macdonald; Second: Earl MacInnes; Lead: Wayne Petch | Glooscap CC, Kentville Skip: Ian Baird; Third: Donald Campbell; Second: Duncan Smith; Lead: Morris Kennie | Hanover CC, Hanover Skip: Robert Mann; Third: Kenneth Buchan; Second: Keith Munro; Lead: Richard Palmer |
| Prince Edward Island | Quebec | Saskatchewan |
| Charlottetown CC, Charlottetown Skip: Arthur Burke; Third: Alan Smith; Second: Bob Dillon; Lead: Sterling Lavers | Howick CC, Howick Skip: Elmer Black; Third: John Logan; Second: Oakley McRae; Lead: William Ness | Regina CC, Regina Skip: Ernie Richardson; Third: Arnold Richardson; Second: Garnet Richardson; Lead: Wes Richardson |

== Round-robin standings ==
Key
| Brier champion |

| Province | Skip | W | L | PF | PA |
|---|---|---|---|---|---|
| British Columbia | Lyall Dagg | 9 | 1 | 104 | 65 |
| Saskatchewan | Ernie Richardson | 8 | 2 | 100 | 67 |
| Manitoba | Bruce Hudson | 7 | 3 | 94 | 81 |
| Quebec | Elmer Black | 6 | 4 | 94 | 93 |
| Alberta | Ron Northcott | 5 | 5 | 90 | 83 |
| Ontario | Robert Mann | 5 | 5 | 88 | 86 |
| Prince Edward Island | Arthur Burke | 5 | 5 | 86 | 85 |
| Northern Ontario | Jack Polyblank | 4 | 6 | 83 | 95 |
| Nova Scotia | Ian Baird | 3 | 7 | 67 | 84 |
| New Brunswick | Harold Mabey Sr. | 3 | 7 | 82 | 96 |
| Newfoundland | Edward Pedley | 0 | 10 | 68 | 121 |

== Round-robin results ==
All draw times are listed in Atlantic Time (UTC-04:00)

=== Draw 1 ===
Monday, March 2 3:00 PM

| Sheet A | 1 | 2 | 3 | 4 | 5 | 6 | 7 | 8 | 9 | 10 | 11 | 12 | Final |
| New Brunswick (Mabey) | 0 | 4 | 0 | 0 | 1 | 1 | 0 | 0 | 2 | 0 | 0 | 1 | 9 |
| Ontario (Mann) | 1 | 0 | 3 | 1 | 0 | 0 | 1 | 4 | 0 | 3 | 2 | 0 | 15 |

| Sheet B | 1 | 2 | 3 | 4 | 5 | 6 | 7 | 8 | 9 | 10 | 11 | 12 | Final |
| British Columbia (Dagg) | 1 | 0 | 0 | 1 | 0 | 0 | 0 | 1 | 1 | 2 | 2 | 1 | 9 |
| Alberta (Northcott) | 0 | 1 | 2 | 0 | 2 | 2 | 1 | 0 | 0 | 0 | 0 | 0 | 8 |

| Sheet C | 1 | 2 | 3 | 4 | 5 | 6 | 7 | 8 | 9 | 10 | 11 | 12 | Final |
| Manitoba (Hudson) | 0 | 1 | 1 | 0 | 0 | 0 | 1 | 0 | 0 | 0 | 1 | 1 | 5 |
| Saskatchewan (Richardson) | 1 | 0 | 0 | 3 | 2 | 1 | 0 | 2 | 1 | 1 | 0 | 0 | 11 |

| Sheet D | 1 | 2 | 3 | 4 | 5 | 6 | 7 | 8 | 9 | 10 | 11 | 12 | Final |
| Newfoundland (Pedley) | 0 | 1 | 0 | 2 | 0 | 2 | 0 | 1 | 0 | 1 | 0 | 2 | 9 |
| Northern Ontario (Polyblank) | 1 | 0 | 1 | 0 | 2 | 0 | 3 | 0 | 1 | 0 | 2 | 0 | 10 |

| Sheet E | 1 | 2 | 3 | 4 | 5 | 6 | 7 | 8 | 9 | 10 | 11 | 12 | Final |
| Prince Edward Island (Burke) | 1 | 0 | 1 | 3 | 1 | 0 | 0 | 0 | 0 | 1 | 2 | 1 | 10 |
| Nova Scotia (Baird) | 0 | 1 | 0 | 0 | 0 | 2 | 0 | 2 | 1 | 0 | 0 | 0 | 6 |

=== Draw 2 ===
Monday, March 2 8:00 PM

| Sheet A | 1 | 2 | 3 | 4 | 5 | 6 | 7 | 8 | 9 | 10 | 11 | 12 | Final |
| Newfoundland (Pedley) | 0 | 0 | 0 | 1 | 0 | 0 | 0 | 3 | 0 | 3 | 0 | 3 | 10 |
| New Brunswick (Mabey) | 1 | 3 | 1 | 0 | 1 | 3 | 0 | 0 | 2 | 0 | 3 | 0 | 14 |

| Sheet B | 1 | 2 | 3 | 4 | 5 | 6 | 7 | 8 | 9 | 10 | 11 | 12 | Final |
| Quebec (Black) | 3 | 0 | 1 | 0 | 0 | 0 | 0 | 2 | 0 | 1 | 0 | 2 | 9 |
| Saskatchewan (Richardson) | 0 | 2 | 0 | 0 | 3 | 1 | 2 | 0 | 3 | 0 | 2 | 0 | 13 |

| Sheet C | 1 | 2 | 3 | 4 | 5 | 6 | 7 | 8 | 9 | 10 | 11 | 12 | Final |
| British Columbia (Dagg) | 3 | 0 | 1 | 0 | 1 | 2 | 0 | 1 | 0 | 0 | 0 | 1 | 9 |
| Ontario (Mann) | 0 | 2 | 0 | 1 | 0 | 0 | 1 | 0 | 2 | 0 | 1 | 0 | 7 |

| Sheet D | 1 | 2 | 3 | 4 | 5 | 6 | 7 | 8 | 9 | 10 | 11 | 12 | Final |
| Alberta (Northcott) | 0 | 0 | 2 | 0 | 0 | 1 | 1 | 0 | 2 | 1 | 2 | 0 | 9 |
| Nova Scotia (Baird) | 2 | 2 | 0 | 1 | 5 | 0 | 0 | 2 | 0 | 0 | 0 | 1 | 13 |

| Sheet E | 1 | 2 | 3 | 4 | 5 | 6 | 7 | 8 | 9 | 10 | 11 | 12 | Final |
| Prince Edward Island (Burke) | 0 | 2 | 3 | 0 | 1 | 0 | 1 | 0 | 0 | 1 | 1 | 2 | 11 |
| Manitoba (Hudson) | 1 | 0 | 0 | 3 | 0 | 2 | 0 | 2 | 1 | 0 | 0 | 0 | 9 |

=== Draw 3 ===
Tuesday, March 3 9:30 AM

| Sheet A | 1 | 2 | 3 | 4 | 5 | 6 | 7 | 8 | 9 | 10 | 11 | 12 | Final |
| British Columbia (Dagg) | 3 | 0 | 3 | 0 | 1 | 2 | 2 | 0 | 0 | 2 | 0 | 2 | 15 |
| Newfoundland (Pedley) | 0 | 1 | 0 | 1 | 0 | 0 | 0 | 2 | 1 | 0 | 1 | 0 | 6 |

| Sheet B | 1 | 2 | 3 | 4 | 5 | 6 | 7 | 8 | 9 | 10 | 11 | 12 | Final |
| Northern Ontario (Polyblank) | 2 | 0 | 2 | 0 | 1 | 3 | 0 | 1 | 0 | 0 | 1 | 1 | 11 |
| New Brunswick (Mabey) | 0 | 1 | 0 | 3 | 0 | 0 | 1 | 0 | 2 | 2 | 0 | 0 | 9 |

| Sheet C | 1 | 2 | 3 | 4 | 5 | 6 | 7 | 8 | 9 | 10 | 11 | 12 | Final |
| Nova Scotia (Baird) | 1 | 0 | 1 | 1 | 0 | 0 | 0 | 1 | 0 | 0 | 2 | 0 | 6 |
| Ontario (Mann) | 0 | 1 | 0 | 0 | 0 | 1 | 2 | 0 | 0 | 4 | 0 | 1 | 9 |

| Sheet D | 1 | 2 | 3 | 4 | 5 | 6 | 7 | 8 | 9 | 10 | 11 | 12 | Final |
| Quebec (Black) | 0 | 2 | 1 | 0 | 1 | 0 | 1 | 2 | 0 | 0 | 1 | 0 | 8 |
| Prince Edward Island (Burke) | 0 | 0 | 0 | 1 | 0 | 2 | 0 | 0 | 2 | 1 | 0 | 1 | 7 |

| Sheet E | 1 | 2 | 3 | 4 | 5 | 6 | 7 | 8 | 9 | 10 | 11 | 12 | Final |
| Alberta (Northcott) | 0 | 1 | 1 | 0 | 1 | 0 | 1 | 0 | 4 | 0 | 0 | 0 | 8 |
| Manitoba (Hudson) | 0 | 0 | 0 | 2 | 0 | 1 | 0 | 3 | 0 | 2 | 1 | 2 | 11 |

=== Draw 4 ===
Tuesday, March 3 3:00 PM

| Sheet A | 1 | 2 | 3 | 4 | 5 | 6 | 7 | 8 | 9 | 10 | 11 | 12 | Final |
| Nova Scotia (Baird) | 0 | 1 | 3 | 0 | 2 | 0 | 2 | 2 | 0 | 1 | 0 | 1 | 12 |
| Newfoundland (Pedley) | 0 | 0 | 0 | 2 | 0 | 1 | 0 | 0 | 2 | 0 | 1 | 0 | 6 |

| Sheet B | 1 | 2 | 3 | 4 | 5 | 6 | 7 | 8 | 9 | 10 | 11 | 12 | Final |
| Northern Ontario (Polyblank) | 0 | 2 | 0 | 1 | 0 | 1 | 0 | 2 | 0 | 1 | 1 | 0 | 8 |
| British Columbia (Dagg) | 3 | 0 | 1 | 0 | 2 | 0 | 1 | 0 | 3 | 0 | 0 | 1 | 11 |

| Sheet C | 1 | 2 | 3 | 4 | 5 | 6 | 7 | 8 | 9 | 10 | 11 | 12 | Final |
| Ontario (Mann) | 1 | 0 | 1 | 0 | 1 | 0 | 0 | 1 | 0 | 0 | 1 | 0 | 5 |
| Manitoba (Hudson) | 0 | 2 | 0 | 1 | 0 | 1 | 0 | 0 | 2 | 1 | 0 | 4 | 11 |

| Sheet D | 1 | 2 | 3 | 4 | 5 | 6 | 7 | 8 | 9 | 10 | 11 | 12 | Final |
| Alberta (Northcott) | 0 | 1 | 1 | 4 | 1 | 0 | 1 | 2 | 0 | 0 | 0 | 5 | 15 |
| Quebec (Black) | 0 | 0 | 0 | 0 | 0 | 2 | 0 | 0 | 4 | 1 | 1 | 0 | 8 |

| Sheet E | 1 | 2 | 3 | 4 | 5 | 6 | 7 | 8 | 9 | 10 | 11 | 12 | Final |
| Saskatchewan (Richardson) | 1 | 0 | 1 | 0 | 0 | 1 | 0 | 4 | 0 | 3 | 0 | 2 | 12 |
| Prince Edward Island (Burke) | 0 | 2 | 0 | 1 | 3 | 0 | 1 | 0 | 1 | 0 | 1 | 0 | 9 |

=== Draw 5 ===
Wednesday, March 4 3:00 PM

| Sheet A | 1 | 2 | 3 | 4 | 5 | 6 | 7 | 8 | 9 | 10 | 11 | 12 | Final |
| New Brunswick (Mabey) | 0 | 2 | 0 | 1 | 0 | 1 | 0 | 1 | 0 | 0 | 1 | 0 | 6 |
| British Columbia (Dagg) | 1 | 0 | 1 | 0 | 2 | 0 | 2 | 0 | 1 | 0 | 0 | 3 | 10 |

| Sheet B | 1 | 2 | 3 | 4 | 5 | 6 | 7 | 8 | 9 | 10 | 11 | 12 | Final |
| Saskatchewan (Richardson) | 0 | 0 | 0 | 0 | 2 | 0 | 2 | 0 | 0 | 1 | 3 | 0 | 8 |
| Alberta (Northcott) | 0 | 1 | 0 | 0 | 0 | 2 | 0 | 2 | 0 | 0 | 0 | 0 | 5 |

| Sheet C | 1 | 2 | 3 | 4 | 5 | 6 | 7 | 8 | 9 | 10 | 11 | 12 | Final |
| Manitoba (Hudson) | 0 | 2 | 2 | 1 | 0 | 5 | 0 | 1 | 0 | 3 | 1 | 0 | 15 |
| Newfoundland (Pedley) | 3 | 0 | 0 | 0 | 1 | 0 | 1 | 0 | 2 | 0 | 0 | 1 | 8 |

| Sheet D | 1 | 2 | 3 | 4 | 5 | 6 | 7 | 8 | 9 | 10 | 11 | 12 | Final |
| Nova Scotia (Baird) | 0 | 2 | 0 | 0 | 0 | 0 | 0 | 1 | 0 | 0 | 0 | 1 | 4 |
| Northern Ontario (Polyblank) | 0 | 0 | 2 | 1 | 1 | 0 | 0 | 0 | 0 | 2 | 1 | 0 | 7 |

| Sheet E | 1 | 2 | 3 | 4 | 5 | 6 | 7 | 8 | 9 | 10 | 11 | 12 | Final |
| Ontario (Mann) | 0 | 1 | 2 | 0 | 0 | 0 | 2 | 0 | 2 | 0 | 0 | 1 | 8 |
| Quebec (Black) | 2 | 0 | 0 | 2 | 3 | 1 | 0 | 1 | 0 | 2 | 1 | 0 | 12 |

=== Draw 6 ===
Wednesday, March 4 8:00 PM

| Sheet A | 1 | 2 | 3 | 4 | 5 | 6 | 7 | 8 | 9 | 10 | 11 | 12 | Final |
| New Brunswick (Mabey) | 0 | 0 | 1 | 0 | 0 | 0 | 0 | 1 | 0 | 1 | 0 | 0 | 3 |
| Nova Scotia (Baird) | 0 | 0 | 0 | 0 | 0 | 2 | 0 | 0 | 1 | 0 | 0 | 1 | 4 |

| Sheet B | 1 | 2 | 3 | 4 | 5 | 6 | 7 | 8 | 9 | 10 | 11 | 12 | Final |
| Ontario (Mann) | 2 | 0 | 2 | 0 | 0 | 0 | 1 | 0 | 0 | 2 | 0 | 1 | 8 |
| Saskatchewan (Richardson) | 0 | 2 | 0 | 2 | 1 | 1 | 0 | 2 | 0 | 0 | 4 | 0 | 12 |

| Sheet C | 1 | 2 | 3 | 4 | 5 | 6 | 7 | 8 | 9 | 10 | 11 | 12 | Final |
| Newfoundland (Pedley) | 0 | 2 | 0 | 2 | 0 | 0 | 1 | 0 | 0 | 1 | 0 | 3 | 9 |
| Quebec (Black) | 1 | 0 | 4 | 0 | 1 | 1 | 0 | 2 | 1 | 0 | 2 | 0 | 12 |

| Sheet D | 1 | 2 | 3 | 4 | 5 | 6 | 7 | 8 | 9 | 10 | 11 | 12 | Final |
| Manitoba (Hudson) | 2 | 2 | 2 | 0 | 0 | 0 | 1 | 2 | 0 | 1 | 0 | 0 | 10 |
| Northern Ontario (Polyblank) | 0 | 0 | 0 | 3 | 1 | 1 | 0 | 0 | 1 | 0 | 1 | 1 | 8 |

| Sheet E | 1 | 2 | 3 | 4 | 5 | 6 | 7 | 8 | 9 | 10 | 11 | 12 | Final |
| Prince Edward Island (Burke) | 1 | 0 | 0 | 2 | 2 | 0 | 0 | 1 | 1 | 1 | 0 | 1 | 9 |
| Alberta (Northcott) | 0 | 2 | 0 | 0 | 0 | 1 | 0 | 0 | 0 | 0 | 4 | 0 | 7 |

=== Draw 7 ===
Thursday, March 5 9:30 AM

| Sheet A | 1 | 2 | 3 | 4 | 5 | 6 | 7 | 8 | 9 | 10 | 11 | 12 | Final |
| Newfoundland (Pedley) | 0 | 1 | 0 | 0 | 0 | 0 | 2 | 0 | 1 | 0 | 0 | 1 | 5 |
| Saskatchewan (Richardson) | 1 | 0 | 1 | 1 | 1 | 4 | 0 | 5 | 0 | 2 | 1 | 0 | 16 |

| Sheet B | 1 | 2 | 3 | 4 | 5 | 6 | 7 | 8 | 9 | 10 | 11 | 12 | Final |
| British Columbia (Dagg) | 1 | 0 | 0 | 2 | 0 | 1 | 0 | 2 | 2 | 0 | 4 | 0 | 12 |
| Nova Scotia (Baird) | 0 | 2 | 0 | 0 | 1 | 0 | 1 | 0 | 0 | 1 | 0 | 1 | 6 |

| Sheet C | 1 | 2 | 3 | 4 | 5 | 6 | 7 | 8 | 9 | 10 | 11 | 12 | Final |
| Manitoba (Hudson) | 0 | 0 | 1 | 2 | 0 | 0 | 1 | 1 | 0 | 1 | 0 | 2 | 8 |
| New Brunswick (Mabey) | 1 | 2 | 0 | 0 | 0 | 1 | 0 | 0 | 2 | 0 | 1 | 0 | 7 |

| Sheet D | 1 | 2 | 3 | 4 | 5 | 6 | 7 | 8 | 9 | 10 | 11 | 12 | Final |
| Prince Edward Island (Burke) | 0 | 0 | 0 | 3 | 0 | 0 | 0 | 1 | 0 | 0 | 2 | 0 | 6 |
| Ontario (Mann) | 0 | 1 | 1 | 0 | 0 | 2 | 0 | 0 | 0 | 1 | 0 | 3 | 8 |

| Sheet E | 1 | 2 | 3 | 4 | 5 | 6 | 7 | 8 | 9 | 10 | 11 | 12 | Final |
| Quebec (Black) | 1 | 2 | 0 | 1 | 1 | 1 | 0 | 2 | 4 | 0 | 0 | 0 | 12 |
| Northern Ontario (Polyblank) | 0 | 0 | 2 | 0 | 0 | 0 | 2 | 0 | 0 | 1 | 1 | 2 | 8 |

=== Draw 8 ===
Thursday, March 5 3:00 PM

| Sheet A | 1 | 2 | 3 | 4 | 5 | 6 | 7 | 8 | 9 | 10 | 11 | 12 | Final |
| British Columbia (Dagg) | 2 | 2 | 0 | 2 | 1 | 0 | 3 | 1 | 1 | 0 | 2 | 0 | 14 |
| Manitoba (Hudson) | 0 | 0 | 1 | 0 | 0 | 1 | 0 | 0 | 0 | 1 | 0 | 1 | 4 |

| Sheet B | 1 | 2 | 3 | 4 | 5 | 6 | 7 | 8 | 9 | 10 | 11 | 12 | Final |
| Northern Ontario (Polyblank) | 2 | 0 | 0 | 1 | 0 | 3 | 0 | 1 | 0 | 0 | 0 | 1 | 8 |
| Saskatchewan (Richardson) | 0 | 1 | 1 | 0 | 1 | 0 | 1 | 0 | 0 | 1 | 1 | 0 | 6 |

| Sheet C | 1 | 2 | 3 | 4 | 5 | 6 | 7 | 8 | 9 | 10 | 11 | 12 | Final |
| Newfoundland (Pedley) | 0 | 1 | 1 | 0 | 0 | 0 | 1 | 0 | 1 | 0 | 1 | 1 | 6 |
| Prince Edward Island (Burke) | 0 | 0 | 0 | 3 | 1 | 1 | 0 | 1 | 0 | 2 | 0 | 0 | 8 |

| Sheet D | 1 | 2 | 3 | 4 | 5 | 6 | 7 | 8 | 9 | 10 | 11 | 12 | 13 | Final |
| Alberta (Northcott) | 1 | 0 | 1 | 0 | 0 | 2 | 0 | 0 | 1 | 1 | 0 | 0 | 1 | 7 |
| Ontario (Mann) | 0 | 2 | 0 | 1 | 1 | 0 | 0 | 1 | 0 | 0 | 1 | 0 | 0 | 6 |

| Sheet E | 1 | 2 | 3 | 4 | 5 | 6 | 7 | 8 | 9 | 10 | 11 | 12 | Final |
| Quebec (Black) | 0 | 0 | 0 | 0 | 2 | 0 | 2 | 1 | 1 | 0 | 1 | 0 | 7 |
| New Brunswick (Mabey) | 2 | 0 | 1 | 1 | 0 | 3 | 0 | 0 | 0 | 1 | 0 | 1 | 9 |

=== Draw 9 ===
Thursday, March 5 8:00 PM

| Sheet A | 1 | 2 | 3 | 4 | 5 | 6 | 7 | 8 | 9 | 10 | 11 | 12 | Final |
| Saskatchewan (Richardson) | 4 | 0 | 1 | 0 | 1 | 1 | 0 | 1 | 0 | 2 | 1 | 1 | 12 |
| New Brunswick (Mabey) | 0 | 1 | 0 | 1 | 0 | 0 | 1 | 0 | 1 | 0 | 0 | 0 | 4 |

| Sheet B | 1 | 2 | 3 | 4 | 5 | 6 | 7 | 8 | 9 | 10 | 11 | 12 | Final |
| Quebec (Black) | 0 | 2 | 0 | 0 | 1 | 1 | 0 | 1 | 2 | 2 | 0 | 1 | 10 |
| British Columbia (Dagg) | 2 | 0 | 1 | 2 | 0 | 0 | 1 | 0 | 0 | 0 | 1 | 0 | 7 |

| Sheet C | 1 | 2 | 3 | 4 | 5 | 6 | 7 | 8 | 9 | 10 | 11 | 12 | Final |
| Nova Scotia (Baird) | 1 | 1 | 0 | 0 | 0 | 0 | 1 | 0 | 1 | 0 | 0 | 0 | 4 |
| Manitoba (Hudson) | 0 | 0 | 1 | 0 | 0 | 2 | 0 | 3 | 0 | 2 | 1 | 1 | 10 |

| Sheet D | 1 | 2 | 3 | 4 | 5 | 6 | 7 | 8 | 9 | 10 | 11 | 12 | Final |
| Alberta (Northcott) | 2 | 0 | 0 | 0 | 0 | 0 | 0 | 2 | 0 | 1 | 1 | 1 | 7 |
| Newfoundland (Pedley) | 0 | 0 | 0 | 0 | 1 | 2 | 0 | 0 | 1 | 0 | 0 | 0 | 4 |

| Sheet E | 1 | 2 | 3 | 4 | 5 | 6 | 7 | 8 | 9 | 10 | 11 | 12 | Final |
| Northern Ontario (Polyblank) | 0 | 2 | 0 | 0 | 0 | 3 | 0 | 0 | 1 | 0 | 1 | 0 | 7 |
| Prince Edward Island (Burke) | 1 | 0 | 2 | 0 | 0 | 0 | 5 | 0 | 0 | 1 | 0 | 4 | 13 |

=== Draw 10 ===
Friday, March 6 9:30 AM

| Sheet A | 1 | 2 | 3 | 4 | 5 | 6 | 7 | 8 | 9 | 10 | 11 | 12 | Final |
| Saskatchewan (Richardson) | 0 | 0 | 1 | 0 | 0 | 0 | 0 | 0 | 1 | 0 | 0 | 1 | 3 |
| British Columbia (Dagg) | 1 | 0 | 0 | 1 | 1 | 0 | 1 | 1 | 0 | 3 | 0 | 0 | 8 |

| Sheet B | 1 | 2 | 3 | 4 | 5 | 6 | 7 | 8 | 9 | 10 | 11 | 12 | Final |
| Nova Scotia (Baird) | 0 | 0 | 0 | 0 | 2 | 0 | 1 | 0 | 1 | 0 | 0 | 2 | 6 |
| Quebec (Black) | 0 | 0 | 3 | 3 | 0 | 1 | 0 | 3 | 0 | 0 | 1 | 0 | 11 |

| Sheet C | 1 | 2 | 3 | 4 | 5 | 6 | 7 | 8 | 9 | 10 | 11 | 12 | Final |
| New Brunswick (Mabey) | 0 | 4 | 0 | 0 | 2 | 0 | 1 | 0 | 3 | 0 | 1 | 2 | 13 |
| Prince Edward Island (Burke) | 1 | 0 | 1 | 0 | 0 | 2 | 0 | 1 | 0 | 1 | 0 | 0 | 6 |

| Sheet D | 1 | 2 | 3 | 4 | 5 | 6 | 7 | 8 | 9 | 10 | 11 | 12 | Final |
| Ontario (Mann) | 1 | 2 | 3 | 0 | 1 | 0 | 2 | 0 | 2 | 0 | 0 | 1 | 12 |
| Newfoundland (Pedley) | 0 | 0 | 0 | 1 | 0 | 1 | 0 | 2 | 0 | 0 | 1 | 0 | 5 |

| Sheet E | 1 | 2 | 3 | 4 | 5 | 6 | 7 | 8 | 9 | 10 | 11 | 12 | Final |
| Northern Ontario (Polyblank) | 1 | 1 | 0 | 0 | 2 | 0 | 2 | 0 | 1 | 0 | 0 | 0 | 7 |
| Alberta (Northcott) | 0 | 0 | 2 | 2 | 0 | 1 | 0 | 2 | 0 | 2 | 1 | 1 | 11 |

=== Draw 11 ===
Friday, March 6 3:00 PM

| Sheet A | 1 | 2 | 3 | 4 | 5 | 6 | 7 | 8 | 9 | 10 | 11 | 12 | Final |
| Saskatchewan (Richardson) | 1 | 0 | 2 | 0 | 1 | 0 | 0 | 2 | 0 | 1 | 0 | 0 | 7 |
| Nova Scotia (Baird) | 0 | 1 | 0 | 1 | 0 | 0 | 1 | 0 | 1 | 0 | 1 | 1 | 6 |

| Sheet B | 1 | 2 | 3 | 4 | 5 | 6 | 7 | 8 | 9 | 10 | 11 | 12 | 13 | Final |
| Prince Edward Island (Burke) | 0 | 0 | 0 | 0 | 2 | 2 | 1 | 0 | 0 | 1 | 1 | 0 | 0 | 7 |
| British Columbia (Dagg) | 0 | 1 | 0 | 1 | 0 | 0 | 0 | 3 | 1 | 0 | 0 | 1 | 2 | 9 |

| Sheet C | 1 | 2 | 3 | 4 | 5 | 6 | 7 | 8 | 9 | 10 | 11 | 12 | Final |
| Manitoba (Hudson) | 0 | 0 | 4 | 0 | 1 | 0 | 0 | 4 | 0 | 0 | 0 | 2 | 11 |
| Quebec (Black) | 1 | 0 | 0 | 1 | 0 | 1 | 0 | 0 | 1 | 0 | 1 | 0 | 5 |

| Sheet D | 1 | 2 | 3 | 4 | 5 | 6 | 7 | 8 | 9 | 10 | 11 | 12 | Final |
| New Brunswick (Mabey) | 0 | 2 | 0 | 2 | 0 | 0 | 2 | 0 | 0 | 2 | 0 | 0 | 8 |
| Alberta (Northcott) | 1 | 0 | 2 | 0 | 0 | 2 | 0 | 2 | 2 | 0 | 1 | 3 | 13 |

| Sheet E | 1 | 2 | 3 | 4 | 5 | 6 | 7 | 8 | 9 | 10 | 11 | 12 | 13 | Final |
| Ontario (Mann) | 0 | 1 | 0 | 0 | 2 | 1 | 0 | 2 | 0 | 2 | 1 | 0 | 1 | 10 |
| Northern Ontario (Polyblank) | 1 | 0 | 1 | 2 | 0 | 0 | 2 | 0 | 2 | 0 | 0 | 1 | 0 | 9 |
