= Ernie Richardson (curler) =

Canadian curler (born 1931)

- Curler
- Born: August 4, 1931 (age 95); Stoughton, Saskatchewan
Medal record
Representing Canada
Men's Curling
World championships
Gold medal – first place	1959 Scotland	Team
Gold medal – first place	1960 Scotland	Team
Gold medal – first place	1962 Scotland	Team
Gold medal – first place	1963 Perth	Team
Representing Saskatchewan
Macdonald Brier
Gold medal – first place	1959 Quebec City
Gold medal – first place	1960 Fort William
Gold medal – first place	1962 Kitchener
Gold medal – first place	1963 Brandon
Silver medal – second place	1964 Charlottetown

Ernest M. Richardson, CM (born August 4, 1931) is a four-time Canadian and world curling champion. Richardson mainly curled with his brother and two cousins, until an injury forced him to replace one of his cousins. He was nicknamed "The King", and has been inducted into the World Curling Federation Hall of Fame, the Canadian Sports Hall of Fame and the Saskatchewan Sports Hall of Fame.

== Playing career ==
Richardson was the skip of the Regina-based team made up of his brother Garnet and cousins Arnold and Wes during the late 1950s and early 1960s. In 1963, Wes Richardson was suffering from back issues, and was replaced on the team by Mel Perry. The team was dominant on the Canadian curling scene during this time. Starting in 1959, Richardson's team won the Canadian Championship four times in five years and captured four World Championships. With their first victory in 1959, they were the youngest team to win the Brier at the time. In 1973, Richardson co-wrote the book Sports Illustrated Curling: Techniques and Strategy with Mark Mulvoy.

In 1978, in recognition of his contributions to the sport of curling, Ernie Richardson was made a member of the Order of Canada. Along with his brother and cousins, he was elected to the Saskatchewan Sports Hall of Fame, Canada's Sports Hall of Fame (1968) and the Canadian Curling Hall of Fame (1973). Richardson was also awarded the World Curling Freytag Award in 2000. Later, when the World Curling Federation changed their criteria for honouring individuals, Richardson was inducted into the WCF Hall of Fame, along with all other previous award recipients.

== Personal life ==
Richardson was nicknamed "The King" due to his early and frequent success as a curler. After his retirement, Richardson authored several books on curling. Richardson was married. With his wife, Rikki, he had five children. He is a fan of the Saskatchewan Roughriders. After his retirement from curling, Richardson started a lighting business that his family still operates.
