= 2011 Edinburgh International =

- Host city: Edinburgh, Scotland
- Arena: Murrayfield Curling Club
- Dates: November 25–27
- Winner: (Scotland) Tom Brewster
- Curling club: Aberdeen, Scotland
- Skip: Tom Brewster
- Third: Greg Drummond
- Second: Scott Andrews
- Lead: Michael Goodfellow
- Finalist: (Scotland) Sandy Reid

The 2011 Edinburgh International was held from November 25 to 27 at the Murrayfield Curling Club in Edinburgh, Scotland as part of the 2011–12 World Curling Tour. The total purse for the event was GBP£10,000, and the winner, Tom Brewster received GBP£4,000. The event was held in a round-robin format.

== Teams ==
Skip	Third	Second	Lead	Locale
Graeme Black	Neil McKinlay	Colin Howden	Ross McKinlay	Lockerbie, Scotland
Tom Brewster	Greg Drummond	Scott Andrews	Michael Goodfellow	Aberdeen, Scotland
David Edwards	John Penny	Scott MacLeod	Colin Campbell	Aberdeen, Scotland
Logan Gray	Alasdair Guthrie	Steve Mitchell	Sandy Gilmour	Stirling, Scotland
John Hamilton	Philip Garden	Jamie Dick	Graeme Copland	Edinburgh, Scotland
Frazer Hare	Robbie Dick	Jamie Strawthorn	Don Frame	Scotland
Stefan Häsler	Stefan Rindlisbacher	Thomas Rubin	Jörg Lüthy	Switzerland
Toni Müller (fourth)	Jan Hauser (skip)	Marco Ramstein	Jurg Bamert	Zürich, Switzerland
Pascal Hess	Yves Hess	Florian Meister	Stefan Meienberg	Switzerland
Lee McCleary	James Stark	Neil Joss	Gavin Fleming	Scotland
Jay McWilliam	Colin Dick	Grant Hardie	Billy Morton	Edinburgh, Scotland
David Murdoch	Glen Muirhead	Ross Paterson	Richard Woods	Lockerbie, Scotland
Marco Pascale	Lorenzo Piatti	Alessio Gonin	Elvis Molinero	Italy
Tomi Rantamäki	Jussi Uusipaavalniemi	Pekka Peura	Jermo Pollanen	Finland
Sandy Reid	Moray Combe	Neil MacArthur	David Soutar	Scotland
Joël Retornaz	Silvio Zanotelli	Davide Zanotelli	Mirco Ferretti	Cortina, Italy
Graham Shaw	Brian Binnie	David Hay	Robin Niven	Scotland
Graham Shedden	Hugh Thomson	Chay Telfer	John Tait	Scotland
David Sik	David Marek	Karel Uher	Milan Polivka	Prague, Czech Republic
David Smith	Warwick Smith	Craig Wilson	Ross Hepburn	Perth, Scotland
Jiří Snítil	Martin Snítil	Jindrich Kitzberger	Marek Vydra	Prague, Czech Republic
Paul Stevenson	Ruaraidh Whyte	Lindsay Gray	Tim Stevenson	Scotland
Thomas Ulsrud	Torger Nergård	Christoffer Svae	Håvard Vad Petersson	Oslo, Norway
Markku Uusipaavalniemi	Toni Anttila	Kasper Hakunti	Joni Ikonen	Helsinki, Finland

== Round robin standings ==
Pool A	W	L
(Scotland) Sandy Reid	4	1
(Switzerland) Pascal Hess	3	2
(Norway) Thomas Ulsrud	3	2
(Scotland) Lee McCleary	3	2
(Scotland) Jay McWilliam	2	3
(Italy) Marco Pascale	0	5

Pool B	W	L
(Scotland) David Smith	5	0
(Scotland) Logan Gray	4	1
(Finland) Tomi Rantamaki	3	2
(Scotland) Frazer Hare	2	3
(Czech Republic) David Sik	1	4
(Scotland) Paul Stevenson	0	5

Pool C	W	L
(Scotland) David Edwards	5	0
(Switzerland) Jan Hauser	4	1
(Czech Republic) Jiří Snítil	2	3
(Scotland) David Murdoch	2	3
(Scotland) Graham Shedden	1	4
(Scotland) Graham Shaw	1	4

Pool D	W	L
(Scotland) Tom Brewster	5	0
(Italy) Joël Retornaz	4	1
(Switzerland) Stefan Häsler	2	3
(Finland) Markku Uusipaavalniemi	2	3
(Scotland) Graeme Black	1	3
(Scotland) John Hamilton	0	4

== Playoffs ==
Quarterfinals
(Scotland) Tom Brewster	8
(Switzerland) Pascal Hess	3
(Scotland) David Smith	7
(Switzerland) Jan Hauser	3
(Scotland) Sandy Reid	6
(Italy) Joël Retornaz	2
(Scotland) David Edwards	4
(Scotland) Logan Gray	5

Semifinals
(Scotland) Tom Brewster	4
(Scotland) David Smith	2
(Scotland) Sandy Reid	7
(Scotland) Logan Gray	1

Final
(Scotland) Tom Brewster	5
(Scotland) Sandy Reid	4
