= Bill Groom =

William George Groom (June 2, 1934 – January 22, 2016) was a Canadian curler from Sudbury, Ontario, Canada.

Groom was the son of three-time Northern Ontario men's champion Don Groom. While in high school, he played in the 1952 Canadian Junior Curling Championships, then known as the national Schoolboy Championship, and was the winner of four Northern Ontario School Boy championships. In 1960, Groom won the Northern Ontario men's championship, playing second for his father's rink, which also consisted of his brother-in-law Al Armstrong and Art Silver. The team represented Northern Ontario at the 1960 Macdonald Brier, where they finished with a 3-7 record. Groom won the Northern Ontario senior men's championship in 1987 playing with Chucker Ross, and would play in that year's Canadian Senior Curling Championships.

Groom was very active in the local curling community in Sudbury . He was the general chairman of the successful bid committee for Sudbury to host the 1983 Labatt Brier. Groom was an accredited curling official and coached both men's and women's junior rinks.

== Personal life ==
Groom was married to Elanor (Moore) Groom and they had three children. He attended Elm Street Public School, Alexander Public School, Sudbury High School and the University of Western Ontario.
