= Arnold Richardson =

Canadian curler

- Curler
- Born: October 2, 1928 (age 98); Estevan, Saskatchewan
Medal record
Representing Canada
Men's Curling
World championships
Gold medal – first place	1959 Scotland	Team
Gold medal – first place	1960 Scotland	Team
Gold medal – first place	1962 Scotland	Team
Gold medal – first place	1963 Perth	Team
Representing Saskatchewan
Macdonald Brier
Gold medal – first place	1959 Quebec City
Gold medal – first place	1960 Fort William
Gold medal – first place	1962 Kitchener
Gold medal – first place	1963 Brandon
Silver medal – second place	1964 Charlottetown

Arnold W. Richardson (born October 2, 1928) is a Canadian curler. He played third for the "World famous Richardsons", which won four Briers and four World Curling Championships.

The team consisted of two brothers (skip Ernie and Garnet and their two cousins, Arnold and Wes.) They won the 1959, 1960, 1962 and 1963 Briers as well as their corresponding Scotch Cups (the World Championship at the time).

Arnold lives with his wife Lilian, in Moose Jaw, Saskatchewan.
