= Bobby Young (curler) =

Scottish curler

- Curler

Curling career
- Member Association: Scotland
- World Championship: 2 (1959, 1962)
Medal record
Men's Curling
World championships
Silver medal – second place	1959 Scotland	Team
Bronze medal – third place	1962 Scotland	Team
Scottish Men's Championship
Gold medal – first place	1962

Robert Young was the lead on the team that represented Scotland at the 1959 and 1962 Scotch Cups, the world men's curling championship at the time. He and the team of skip Willie Young, third John Pearson, and second Sandy Anderson curled out of the Airth, Bruce Castle, and Dunmore Curling Club in Falkirk, Scotland.

In addition to his 2 Scotch Cup appearances, he also won four "Worlds Curling Championships" (now known as the Edinburgh International).
