= Wes Richardson =

Canadian curler (1930–2011)

- Curler
- Born: March 20, 1930; Stoughton, Saskatchewan
- Died: April 16, 2011 (aged 81); Kailua, Hawaii, United States
Medal record
Representing Canada
Men's Curling
World championships
Gold medal – first place	1959 Scotland	Team
Gold medal – first place	1960 Scotland	Team
Gold medal – first place	1962 Scotland	Team
Representing Saskatchewan
Macdonald Brier
Gold medal – first place	1959 Quebec City
Gold medal – first place	1960 Fort William
Gold medal – first place	1962 Kitchener
Silver medal – second place	1964 Charlottetown

Wesley H. "Wes" Richardson (March 20, 1930 – April 16, 2011) was a Canadian curler. He played lead for the "World famous Richardsons", winning three of their four Briers and World Curling Championships.

The team consisted of two brothers (skip Ernie and Garnet and their two cousins, Arnold and Wes). As a member of the team, Wes won the 1959, 1960, and 1962 Briers as well as their corresponding Scotch Cups (the World Championship at the time). Wes left the team for the 1962–63 season, due to a back injury, and was replaced by Mel Perry. He returned to the team in 1964.

He was inducted (together with all of "Team Richardson") into the World Curling Federation Hall of Fame in 2017, the Canadian Sports Hall of Fame (1968; the first curling team inducted to this Hall of Fame) and the Canadian Curling Hall of Fame (1973). Wes was a natural athlete, he was also very accomplished at baseball playing for the Regina Red Sox as well as a Hockey player.

Richardson retired to Hawaii, where he was an active cyclist and marathon runner. He died of prostate cancer on April 16, 2011.

== Sources ==
- Wes Richardson at World Curling
- Wes Richardson at Canada's Sports Hall of Fame
- Wesley Richardson – Curling Canada Stats Archive
- The Curling Richardsons - The Team
- Video: 1962 MacDonald Brier (Kitchener-Waterloo, Ontario) on YouTube
