= 1962 Scotch Cup =

- Host city: Falkirk and Edinburgh, Scotland
- Arena: Falkirk Ice Rink (Falkirk) and Haymarket Ice Rink (Edinburgh)
- Dates: 15–16 March & 19–20, 1962
- Winner: Canada
- Curling club: Regina CC; Regina, Saskatchewan
- Skip: Ernie Richardson
- Third: Arnold Richardson
- Second: Garnet Richardson
- Lead: Wes Richardson

The 1962 Scotch Cup was the fourth edition of what would later be called the Men's World Curling Championships. It was held at the Falkirk Ice Rink in Falkirk and the Haymarket Ice Rink in Edinburgh, Scotland and saw the debutant of Sweden in a World Championship. The first half of the matches were held 15 and 16 March in Falkirk and the second half of matches were held 19 and 20 March in Edinburgh. If a playoff was necessary, it would have been held on 21 March in Edinburgh.

Canada would end up winning the title for the fourth time after winning all of their matches with the United States finishing in second place.

== Teams ==
Canada	Scotland	Sweden	United States
Regina CC, Regina, Saskatchewan Skip: Ernie Richardson; Third: Arnold Richardson; Second: Garnet Richardson; Lead: Wes Richardson	Airth, Bruce Castle & Dunmore CC, Falkirk Skip: Willie Young; Third: John Pearson; Second: Sandy Anderson; Lead: Bobby Young	Norrköpings CK Skip: Rolf Arfwidsson; Third: Knut Bartels; Second: Per Ivar Rydgren; Lead: Arne Stern	Hibbing CC, Minnesota Skip: Dick Brown; Third: Terry Kleffman; Second: Fran Kleffman; Lead: Nick Jerulle

== Standings ==
Country	Skip	W	L
Canada	Ernie Richardson	6	0
United States	Dick Brown	4	2
Scotland	Willie Young	2	4
Sweden	Rolf Arfwidsson	0	6

== Results ==
=== Draw 1 ===
Team	1	2	3	4	5	6	7	8	9	10	11	12	Final
Canada (Richardson)	2	2	0	1	0	1	0	1	1	0	0	3	11
United States (Brown)	0	0	2	0	1	0	1	0	0	1	0	0	5

Team	1	2	3	4	5	6	7	8	9	10	11	12	Final
Scotland (Young)	0	4	0	1	1	2	0	0	1	2	1	0	12
Sweden (Arfwidsson)	1	0	2	0	0	0	3	1	0	0	0	1	8

=== Draw 2 ===
Team	1	2	3	4	5	6	7	8	9	10	11	12	Final
Canada (Richardson)	5	1	0	2	0	2	1	1	0	4	1	0	17
Sweden (Arfwidsson)	0	0	2	0	2	0	0	0	2	0	0	1	7

Team	Final
United States (Brown)	10
Scotland (Young)	7

=== Draw 3 ===
Team	1	2	3	4	5	6	7	8	9	10	11	12	Final
Canada (Richardson)	0	2	4	2	3	0	6	0	2	1	0	0	20
Scotland (Young)	0	0	0	0	0	1	0	1	0	0	1	1	4

Team	Final
United States (Brown)	13
Sweden (Arfwidsson)	8

=== Draw 4 ===
Team	1	2	3	4	5	6	7	8	9	10	11	12	Final
Canada (Richardson)	5	0	4	4	0	3	1	3	0	1	2	1	24
Sweden (Arfwidsson)	0	2	0	0	1	0	0	0	1	0	0	0	4

Team	Final
United States (Brown)	14
Scotland (Young)	5

=== Draw 5 ===
Team	1	2	3	4	5	6	7	8	9	10	11	12	Final
Canada (Richardson)	3	0	1	0	1	0	0	0	2	0	2	0	9
United States (Brown)	0	1	0	1	0	0	3	1	0	0	0	2	8

Team	Final
Scotland (Young)	18
Sweden (Arfwidsson)	4

=== Draw 6 ===
Team	1	2	3	4	5	6	7	8	9	10	11	12	Final
Canada (Richardson)	1	0	2	1	0	4	0	1	0	2	2	0	13
Scotland (Young)	0	3	0	0	2	0	1	0	1	0	0	1	8

Team	Final
United States (Brown)	15
Sweden (Arfwidsson)	6

1962 Scotch Cup
Canada
4th title
