= Willie Young (curler) =

Scottish curler

- Curler
- Died: 25 September 1986

Curling career
- Member Association: Scotland
- World Championship: 1 (1959, 1962)
Medal record
Men's Curling
World championships
Silver medal – second place	1959 Scotland	Team
Bronze medal – third place	1962 Scotland	Team
Scottish Men's Championship
Gold medal – first place	1962

William Young (died 25 September 1986) was the skip of the Scottish teams at the 1959 and 1962 Scotch Cups, the world men's curling championship at the time. He and the team of third John Pearson, second Sandy Anderson, and lead Bobby Young curled out of the Airth, Bruce Castle, and Dunmore Curling Club in Falkirk, Scotland.

He is not to be confused with another Willie Young, a curler from Kinross.

Young was a farmer from Bridgend near Airth. He had an unorthodox curling delivery, as he slid with his right foot while also throwing from his right hand. In addition to his 2 Scotch Cup appearances, he also won six "Worlds Curling Championships" (now known as the Edinburgh International).
