= 1959 Scotch Cup =

- Host city: Falkirk, Perth and Edinburgh, Scotland
- Dates: 9–11 March
- Winner: Canada
- Curling club: Civil Service CC; Regina, Saskatchewan
- Skip: Ernie Richardson
- Third: Arnold Richardson
- Second: Garnet Richardson
- Lead: Wes Richardson
- Finalist: Scotland

The 1959 Scotch Cup was the first World Curling Championship. It was a five-game series between the curling teams of Canada and Scotland. The Scotch Cup was held from 9–11 March with games being held in Edinburgh, Perth and Falkirk.

The event was a contrast in curling styles, with the Canadians favouring a hitting game and the Scots favouring the draw game. The Scots were also not used to the rubber hack and the Canadian rules allowing a delivery to the length of the near hogline. Scottish rules at that point dictated the rock to be released by the front of the near house. The Canadian rules favoured the Canadian team, which allowed them a more accurate delivery, which benefited them in the hitting game. Canada would win all five matches in their tour of Scotland.

== Teams ==
Scotland	Canada
Airth, Bruce Castle & Dunmore CC, Falkirk Skip: Willie Young; Third: John Pearson; Second: Jimmy Scott; Lead: Bobby Young	Civil Service CC, Regina, Saskatchewan Skip: Ernie Richardson; Third: Arnold Richardson; Second: Garnet Richardson; Lead: Wes Richardson

== Standings ==
Country	Skip	W	L	PF	PA	EW	EL	BE
Canada	Ernie Richardson	5	0	55	33	31	25	2
Scotland	Willie Young	0	5	33	55	25	31	2

== Results ==
=== Draw 1 ===
A "slim" crowd was on hand for the opening game, held on 9 March in Edinburgh. The event was poorly promoted, and the game was not the only match on the ice. In fact, figure skaters were practicing on a rink behind them.

The ice was keen, but the Richardsons were disappointed with the loose hacks. The Canadians were ahead 4–0 after a takeout miss in the 3rd end by the Scottish skip. They remained in the driver seat for the remainder of the game, and a three-ender in the 11th made victory all but certain.

Team	1	2	3	4	5	6	7	8	9	10	11	12	Final
Canada (Richardson)	1	2	1	0	1	2	0	1	1	0	3	0	12
Scotland (Young)	0	0	0	1	0	0	1	0	0	3	0	1	6

=== Draw 2 ===
The second game in the series was held on the afternoon of 10 March in Perth. The game would be more of a "draw game", which was more comfortable for the Scottish curlers. However, the Canadians won the match, despite not playing their more comfortable hit game. Canada was trailing 8–7 going into the 11th end, but stole a four-ender to secure the victory. The teams played in front of 193 spectators, but they were not the only teams playing "as four or five other sheets were also in use." Up by three in the 12th end, Richardson had his lead throw his first rock through the rings, a common strategy move in today's game which was unheard of in Scotland at the time.

Team	1	2	3	4	5	6	7	8	9	10	11	12	Final
Canada (Richardson)	0	3	0	1	0	0	1	0	1	1	4	0	11
Scotland (Young)	2	0	3	0	1	1	0	1	0	0	0	1	9

=== Draw 3 ===
The third game was also played in Perth on the evening of 10 March. The game was a close affair, and was played in front of 300 spectators, the largest crowd up to that point. The game was tied after ten ends when Ernie Richardson made two mistakes. However, Canada replied in the eleventh when they scored two of their own. Scotland could only muster one point in the final end, losing the match, and Canada clinching the series with two games to play.

Team	1	2	3	4	5	6	7	8	9	10	11	12	Final
Canada (Richardson)	1	0	1	0	0	2	0	2	0	0	2	0	8
Scotland (Young)	0	0	0	1	1	0	1	0	1	2	0	1	7

=== Draw 4 ===
Game 4 was played on 11 March in Falkirk. Canada played the draw game early on, as per an experiment to please the Scottish skip. This frustrated Richardson, who was used to a hitting game. However, he was duly rewarded with four points in the second end and five in the fourth. The Richardsons then reverted to a takeout game, and the Scots scored singles in five of the next six ends, to come within one point of the Canadians after ten. Richardson then scored one in eleven to be up two in the last end. The Canadians played a good end, and the Scots made key misses leaving Willie Young a draw against four on his last to make it a one-point loss, but came up short, giving up four.

Only a few fans watched the match, which was on at the same time as a women's bonspiel.

Team	1	2	3	4	5	6	7	8	9	10	11	12	Final
Canada (Richardson)	0	4	0	5	0	0	1	0	0	0	1	4	15
Scotland (Young)	2	0	2	0	1	1	0	1	1	1	0	0	9

=== Draw 5 ===
The final game was also played in Falkirk on 11 March. The game was shortened to ten ends. Young decided to play the hitting game, but it was not his style, as Canada soon amassed a five-point lead after four ends.

Team	1	2	3	4	5	6	7	8	9	10	Final
Canada (Richardson)	1	1	2	1	0	0	2	1	1	0	9
Scotland (Young)	0	0	0	0	0	1	0	0	0	1	2

1959 Scotch Cup
Canada
1st title
