= Mel Perry =

Canadian curler

Medal record

Representing Canada

Men's Curling

World championships
Gold medal – first place	1963 Perth	Team

F. Melbourne "Mel" Perry (1935 – May 12, 2010) was a Canadian curler from Regina, Saskatchewan. He is best known as playing lead for the "World Famous Richardsons" team (skipped by Ernie Richardson) for the 1962–63 curling season. The regular lead on the team, Wes Richardson had missed the season due to back ailments. The team went on to win the 1963 Brier and the 1963 Scotch Cup, the world championship. He died in 2010, aged 75.
