= 1959 Macdonald Brier =

Canadian men's curling championship

- Host city: Quebec City, Quebec
- Arena: Colisée de Québec
- Dates: March 2–6
- Attendance: 16,000
- Winner: Saskatchewan
- Curling club: Regina CSC, Regina
- Skip: Ernie Richardson
- Third: Arnold Richardson
- Second: Garnet Richardson
- Lead: Wes Richardson
- Finalist: Alberta (Olson)

The 1959 Macdonald Brier, the Canadian men's national curling championship, was held from March 2 to 6, 1959 at the Colisée de Québec in Quebec City, Quebec. This was the second time that Quebec City had hosted the Brier, with the previous time being in 1942. A total of 16,000 fans attended the event. The attendance was affected by a raging blizzard on the final day, when fewer than 1,000 fans attended.

Both Team Alberta and Team Saskatchewan finished round robin play tied for first with 9-1 records, necessitating a tiebreaker playoff for the Brier championship between the two teams. Saskatchewan, skipped by Ernie Richardson, captured the Brier Tankard after defeating Alberta 12–6 in the tiebreaker. This was the second time in which Saskatchewan had captured the Brier championship, and the first of four Brier championships in which Ernie Richardson would skip.

Beginning with the 1959 Brier, the Brier champion would represent Canada in the Scotch Cup. Richardson's rink would go on to defeat Scotland 5 games to none in the first ever Scotch Cup in Scotland.

== Event Summary ==
For most of the 1959 Brier, it was looking like Saskatchewan was going to claim the Brier Tankard as they sat unbeaten at 7-0 heading into the Thursday evening draw. Alberta and Manitoba were both sitting at 6-1 while British Columbia sitting at 5–2 with an outside shot. That evening, Saskatchewan kept their undefeated record alive by eliminating BC in convincing fashion 13–5. Alberta would beat winless Quebec 13-8 while Manitoba hopes for a Brier championship took a big hit as they lost to Prince Edward Island 10–8.

Heading into the final day, Saskatchewan was 8–0 with Alberta sitting at 7-1 and Manitoba needing some help with a 6–2 record. The Friday morning draw would feature a matchup between Alberta and Manitoba with Saskatchewan facing winless Quebec. Saskatchewan would have a chance of clinching the Brier championship with one game remaining with a win combined with an Alberta loss.

A raging blizzard struck Quebec City on the final day of competition causing the attendance at the Colisée to be a lot smaller than usual for the final day of the Brier. In the Friday morning draw, Saskatchewan would hold off Quebec 8-6 thus eliminating Manitoba from championship contention with Alberta managing to stay alive with a 10–8 win over Manitoba.

The final draw of the round robin on Friday afternoon had a lot of suspense. A Saskatchewan win would make them the eleventh team to finish a Brier unbeaten while Alberta needed a win against Northern Ontario and a Saskatchewan loss to Manitoba to force a tiebreaker playoff that evening. In the Alberta/Northern Ontario matchup, Alberta jumped out to a 4–1 lead after three ends. Northern Ontario would tie the game at 4 with one in the fourth and a steal of two in the fifth. Despite this, Alberta would pull away outscoring Northern Ontario 7–2 in the last seven ends for an 11–6 victory. Now all Alberta needed was some help from Manitoba and they got just that. Even though the Manitoba/Saskatchewan game was back-and-forth as it was died at 4 through seven ends, Manitoba would score 3 in the eighth and even though Saskatchewan cut the lead to 7-6 after nine ends, Manitoba would go on to win 9–7, thus necessitating a tiebreaker playoff between Alberta and Saskatchewan for the Brier championship.

For the second consecutive year, the Brier would be decided in a tiebreaker. With less than 1,000 people in attendance due to the ongoing blizzard, the few fans in attendance watched a final saw Saskatchewan jump out to a 7–3 lead through the halfway point. Saskatchewan would dash any hopes of bringing the Brier Tankard back to Alberta as Saskatchewan put the game away for good with 3 in the seventh end as they cruised to a 12–6 victory to capture the Brier championship. By capturing the Brier Tankard, the Ernie Richardson rink also secured a spot in the 1959 Scotch Cup against Scotland for the first ever World Curling Championship.

== Teams ==
The teams are listed as follows:

Alberta	British Columbia	Manitoba	New Brunswick
Edmonton CC, Edmonton Skip: Herbert Olson; Third: Barry Coleman; Second: Mervin Dufresne; Lead: George Dufresne	Vancouver CC, Vancouver Skip: Barry Naimark; Third: Frederick Langen; Second: Evan Wolfe; Lead: Dick Beddoes	Elmwood CC, Winnipeg Skip: Richard Bird; Third: Edward Tipping; Second: Gunnar Nielson; Lead: William Evans	Beaver CC, Moncton Skip: Richard McCully; Third: Cecil McManus; Second: Edward Shutt; Lead: Irving Mitten
Newfoundland	Northern Ontario	Nova Scotia	Ontario
Blomidon CC, Corner Brook Skip: Alexander Fisher; Third: Wilbert Howell; Second: John Gullage; Lead: William Piercey	Fort William CC, Fort William Skip: Darwin Wark; Third: Dennis Stephen; Second: Leslie Sutton; Lead: John Jones	Amherst CC, Amherst Skip: Arthur Forbes; Third: Morell Darragh; Second: Lawrence Carter; Lead: Sidney Chabassol	Unionville CC, Unionville Skip: Edward Seller; Third: John Grant Jr. Second: Harold Lawrie; Lead: Carl Sellers
Prince Edward Island	Quebec	Saskatchewan
Charlottetown CC, Charlottetown Skip: Clifford MacDonald; Third: Douglas Cameron; Second: George Dillon; Lead: Arthur Burke	Outremont CC, Outremont Skip: John Bergmann; Third: Douglas Norris; Second: Harvey McCaig; Lead: John Doran	Regina CSC, Regina Skip: Ernie Richardson; Third: Arnold Richardson; Second: Garnet Richardson; Lead: Wes Richardson

== Round-robin standings ==
Key
Teams to Tiebreaker Playoff

Province	Skip	W	L	PF	PA
Saskatchewan	Ernie Richardson	9	1	109	63
Alberta	Hebert Olson	9	1	112	78
Manitoba	Richard Bird	7	3	109	89
Northern Ontario	Darwin Wark	6	4	107	95
Ontario	Edward Seller	6	4	103	89
British Columbia	Barry Naimark	6	4	103	81
Newfoundland	Alexander Fisher	3	7	87	116
Nova Scotia	Arthur Forbes	3	7	101	112
Prince Edward Island	Clifford MacDonald	3	7	86	107
New Brunswick	Richard McCully	3	7	95	121
Quebec	John Bergmann	0	10	66	127

== Round-robin results ==
All draw times are listed in Eastern Time (UTC-05:00)

=== Draw 1 ===
Monday, March 2 3:00 PM

Sheet A	1	2	3	4	5	6	7	8	9	10	11	12	Final
Northern Ontario (Wark)	0	0	0	1	0	2	0	2	2	0	0	1	8
Saskatchewan (Richardson)	3	1	2	0	3	0	4	0	0	3	1	0	17

Sheet B	1	2	3	4	5	6	7	8	9	10	11	12	Final
Alberta (Olson)	2	1	1	0	3	0	1	0	1	3	1	0	13
Newfoundland (Fisher)	0	0	0	2	0	1	0	1	0	0	0	1	5

Sheet C	1	2	3	4	5	6	7	8	9	10	11	12	Final
New Brunswick (McCully)	0	1	1	0	0	0	1	0	4	1	1	0	9
Manitoba (Bird)	3	0	0	1	2	3	0	3	0	0	0	1	13

Sheet D	1	2	3	4	5	6	7	8	9	10	11	12	Final
Ontario (Seller)	1	1	0	3	0	0	2	1	0	2	0	1	11
Quebec (Bergmann)	0	0	1	0	1	1	0	0	2	0	1	0	6

Sheet E	1	2	3	4	5	6	7	8	9	10	11	12	13	Final
British Columbia (Naimark)	0	0	2	0	3	0	0	0	2	2	0	1	2	12
Nova Scotia (Forbes)	1	1	0	2	0	2	1	2	0	0	1	0	0	10

=== Draw 2 ===
Monday, March 2 8:00 PM

Sheet A	1	2	3	4	5	6	7	8	9	10	11	12	Final
Nova Scotia (Forbes)	1	0	0	0	0	4	1	0	3	0	0	1	10
Quebec (Bergmann)	0	1	1	1	1	0	0	1	0	2	1	0	8

Sheet B	1	2	3	4	5	6	7	8	9	10	11	12	Final
New Brunswick (McCully)	0	1	2	3	0	0	1	0	0	1	1	1	10
Northern Ontario (Wark)	2	0	0	0	2	3	0	1	1	0	0	0	9

Sheet C	1	2	3	4	5	6	7	8	9	10	11	12	Final
Saskatchewan (Richardson)	2	0	5	0	1	3	0	0	3	0	3	1	18
Newfoundland (Fisher)	0	2	0	1	0	0	1	2	0	3	0	0	9

Sheet D	1	2	3	4	5	6	7	8	9	10	11	12	Final
Prince Edward Island (MacDonald)	0	1	0	2	0	0	0	0	0	2	0	0	5
Alberta (Olson)	2	0	2	0	2	1	1	1	1	0	2	1	13

Sheet E	1	2	3	4	5	6	7	8	9	10	11	12	Final
Manitoba (Bird)	1	0	5	4	1	0	0	1	1	0	0	0	13
Ontario (Seller)	0	3	0	0	0	1	1	0	0	1	2	4	12

=== Draw 3 ===
Tuesday, March 3 9:30 AM

Sheet A	1	2	3	4	5	6	7	8	9	10	11	12	Final
Prince Edward Island (MacDonald)	0	1	0	1	0	0	0	0	0	0	1	1	4
Saskatchewan (Richardson)	0	0	1	0	2	0	1	2	1	1	0	0	8

Sheet B	1	2	3	4	5	6	7	8	9	10	11	12	Final
Northern Ontario (Wark)	0	2	0	1	0	1	0	4	1	0	1	0	10
Ontario (Seller)	0	0	1	0	1	0	1	0	0	1	0	1	5

Sheet C	1	2	3	4	5	6	7	8	9	10	11	12	Final
Manitoba (Bird)	1	3	0	0	3	0	3	1	0	2	0	1	14
Nova Scotia (Forbes)	0	0	2	1	0	2	0	0	3	0	1	0	9

Sheet D	1	2	3	4	5	6	7	8	9	10	11	12	Final
British Columbia (Naimark)	2	2	0	3	0	0	3	0	2	0	0	1	13
Quebec (Bergmann)	0	0	1	0	1	2	0	1	0	1	0	0	6

Sheet E	1	2	3	4	5	6	7	8	9	10	11	12	13	Final
New Brunswick (McCully)	0	1	1	2	0	5	0	0	0	0	2	0	1	12
Newfoundland (Fisher)	1	0	0	0	1	0	2	1	2	1	0	3	0	11

=== Draw 4 ===
Tuesday, March 3 2:30 PM

Sheet A	1	2	3	4	5	6	7	8	9	10	11	12	Final
Ontario (Seller)	2	0	2	0	4	2	2	2	1	1	2	0	18
Newfoundland (Fisher)	0	2	0	1	0	0	0	0	0	0	0	1	4

Sheet B	1	2	3	4	5	6	7	8	9	10	11	12	Final
New Brunswick (McCully)	0	1	0	2	0	1	0	0	0	0	1	0	5
Prince Edward Island (MacDonald)	2	0	1	0	5	0	5	1	1	2	0	2	19

Sheet C	1	2	3	4	5	6	7	8	9	10	11	12	Final
Alberta (Olson)	0	0	0	0	0	1	1	0	0	0	2	0	4
Saskatchewan (Richardson)	0	2	2	1	2	0	0	1	1	2	0	2	13

Sheet D	1	2	3	4	5	6	7	8	9	10	11	12	Final
British Columbia (Naimark)	1	3	0	1	1	0	1	0	0	3	0	2	12
Manitoba (Bird)	0	0	1	0	0	2	0	1	1	0	2	0	7

Sheet E	1	2	3	4	5	6	7	8	9	10	11	12	13	Final
Northern Ontario (Wark)	1	0	0	1	2	2	0	0	2	2	0	2	1	13
Nova Scotia (Forbes)	0	2	1	0	0	0	1	6	0	0	2	0	0	12

=== Draw 5 ===
Wednesday, March 4 3:00 PM

Sheet A	1	2	3	4	5	6	7	8	9	10	11	12	Final
Alberta (Olson)	0	1	3	4	0	1	0	0	0	0	1	1	11
New Brunswick (McCully)	1	0	0	0	1	0	3	1	2	2	0	0	10

Sheet B	1	2	3	4	5	6	7	8	9	10	11	12	Final
Newfoundland (Fisher)	1	1	1	2	0	1	2	0	0	3	0	0	11
Nova Scotia (Forbes)	0	0	0	0	1	0	0	2	1	0	2	2	8

Sheet C	1	2	3	4	5	6	7	8	9	10	11	12	Final
Quebec (Bergmann)	2	0	0	1	0	0	1	1	1	0	2	0	8
Manitoba (Bird)	0	2	1	0	2	3	0	0	0	1	0	6	15

Sheet D	1	2	3	4	5	6	7	8	9	10	11	12	Final
Ontario (Seller)	0	1	1	0	3	1	0	0	1	0	1	1	9
Prince Edward Island (MacDonald)	1	0	0	2	0	0	2	2	0	1	0	0	8

Sheet E	1	2	3	4	5	6	7	8	9	10	11	12	Final
Northern Ontario (Wark)	0	0	1	0	3	0	0	0	1	1	0	1	7
British Columbia (Naimark)	0	1	0	1	0	1	1	0	0	0	1	0	5

=== Draw 6 ===
Wednesday, March 4 8:00 PM

Sheet A	1	2	3	4	5	6	7	8	9	10	11	12	Final
Newfoundland (Fisher)	0	0	1	0	1	2	0	0	0	0	1	0	5
British Columbia (Naimark)	3	3	0	1	0	0	5	3	2	1	0	1	19

Sheet B	1	2	3	4	5	6	7	8	9	10	11	12	Final
Saskatchewan (Richardson)	0	4	0	1	0	2	1	0	1	0	0	1	10
New Brunswick (McCully)	1	0	1	0	2	0	0	1	0	1	1	0	7

Sheet C	1	2	3	4	5	6	7	8	9	10	11	12	Final
Quebec (Bergmann)	2	1	0	0	0	0	2	0	3	0	1	0	9
Northern Ontario (Wark)	0	0	2	1	2	3	0	5	0	2	0	2	17

Sheet D	1	2	3	4	5	6	7	8	9	10	11	12	Final
Ontario (Seller)	4	0	1	0	2	0	0	0	0	0	1	0	8
Alberta (Olson)	0	2	0	2	0	3	0	1	1	1	0	3	13

Sheet E	1	2	3	4	5	6	7	8	9	10	11	12	Final
Nova Scotia (Forbes)	0	0	1	0	1	2	0	2	5	0	0	3	14
Prince Edward Island (MacDonald)	1	2	0	1	0	0	2	0	0	6	1	0	13

=== Draw 7 ===
Thursday, March 5 9:00 AM

Sheet A	1	2	3	4	5	6	7	8	9	10	11	12	Final
Saskatchewan (Richardson)	1	0	0	1	0	0	0	1	1	0	2	0	6
Ontario (Seller)	0	1	0	0	0	0	2	0	0	1	0	1	5

Sheet B	1	2	3	4	5	6	7	8	9	10	11	12	Final
Newfoundland (Fisher)	1	1	1	1	0	1	1	0	0	3	2	0	11
Quebec (Bergmann)	0	0	0	0	1	0	0	1	1	0	0	1	4

Sheet C	1	2	3	4	5	6	7	8	9	10	11	12	Final
Prince Edward Island (MacDonald)	2	1	0	0	0	1	0	0	2	1	0	0	7
British Columbia (Naimark)	0	0	1	3	1	0	2	0	0	0	0	1	8

Sheet D	1	2	3	4	5	6	7	8	9	10	11	12	Final
Manitoba (Bird)	3	2	0	2	0	0	0	1	0	1	2	2	13
Northern Ontario (Wark)	0	0	1	0	1	1	1	0	1	0	0	0	5

Sheet E	1	2	3	4	5	6	7	8	9	10	11	12	Final
Nova Scotia (Forbes)	0	1	0	2	1	0	1	0	2	0	1	0	8
Alberta (Olson)	2	0	3	0	0	2	0	1	0	2	0	3	13

=== Draw 8 ===
Thursday, March 5 3:00 PM

Sheet A	1	2	3	4	5	6	7	8	9	10	11	12	Final
Manitoba (Bird)	0	0	1	0	2	0	2	0	1	2	0	1	9
Newfoundland (Fisher)	1	1	0	1	0	2	0	1	0	0	1	0	7

Sheet B	1	2	3	4	5	6	7	8	9	10	11	12	Final
British Columbia (Naimark)	0	1	0	1	0	2	1	0	1	1	0	0	7
Alberta (Olson)	2	0	2	0	2	0	0	2	0	0	2	1	11

Sheet C	1	2	3	4	5	6	7	8	9	10	11	12	Final
Nova Scotia (Forbes)	0	0	1	1	0	0	2	0	1	0	0	1	6
Saskatchewan (Richardson)	3	0	0	0	1	1	0	0	0	0	4	0	9

Sheet D	1	2	3	4	5	6	7	8	9	10	11	12	Final
New Brunswick (McCully)	0	2	0	1	0	0	0	2	2	0	0	4	11
Ontario (Seller)	1	0	2	0	4	3	1	0	0	2	1	0	14

Sheet E	1	2	3	4	5	6	7	8	9	10	11	12	Final
Prince Edward Island (MacDonald)	0	2	0	1	2	0	3	0	1	0	0	2	11
Quebec (Bergmann)	0	0	1	0	0	0	0	1	0	1	2	0	5

=== Draw 9 ===
Thursday, March 5 8:00 PM

Sheet A	1	2	3	4	5	6	7	8	9	10	11	12	Final
Alberta (Olson)	1	0	0	1	1	1	4	0	3	0	0	2	13
Quebec (Bergmann)	0	4	1	0	0	0	0	3	0	0	0	0	8

Sheet B	1	2	3	4	5	6	7	8	9	10	11	12	Final
Prince Edward Island (MacDonald)	0	3	1	0	1	1	2	0	0	1	1	0	10
Manitoba (Bird)	3	0	0	1	0	0	0	1	1	0	0	2	8

Sheet C	1	2	3	4	5	6	7	8	9	10	11	12	Final
New Brunswick (McCully)	1	2	0	3	0	1	0	0	1	0	0	0	8
Nova Scotia (Forbes)	0	0	1	0	1	0	4	2	0	2	3	1	14

Sheet D	1	2	3	4	5	6	7	8	9	10	11	12	Final
Northern Ontario (Wark)	0	3	0	1	0	1	3	1	1	0	0	1	11
Newfoundland (Fisher)	1	0	2	0	1	0	0	0	0	1	3	0	8

Sheet E	1	2	3	4	5	6	7	8	9	10	11	12	Final
British Columbia (Naimark)	0	1	1	0	1	0	0	1	1	0	0	0	5
Saskatchewan (Richardson)	2	0	0	1	0	3	1	0	0	2	2	2	13

=== Draw 10 ===
Friday, March 6 9:30 AM

Sheet A	1	2	3	4	5	6	7	8	9	10	11	12	Final
Quebec (Bergmann)	1	0	1	0	1	1	0	1	0	0	1	0	6
Saskatchewan (Richardson)	0	1	0	2	0	0	2	0	1	1	0	1	8

Sheet B	1	2	3	4	5	6	7	8	9	10	11	12	Final
Alberta (Olson)	0	1	0	0	2	1	0	2	0	2	2	0	10
Manitoba (Bird)	1	0	1	1	0	0	1	0	1	0	0	3	8

Sheet C	1	2	3	4	5	6	7	8	9	10	11	12	Final
British Columbia (Naimark)	0	0	5	0	3	0	1	1	1	2	1	0	14
New Brunswick (McCully)	1	1	0	1	0	1	0	0	0	0	0	1	5

Sheet D	1	2	3	4	5	6	7	8	9	10	11	12	Final
Ontario (Seller)	1	0	0	1	0	3	1	0	0	3	1	1	11
Nova Scotia (Forbes)	0	1	3	0	4	0	0	1	1	0	0	0	10

Sheet E	1	2	3	4	5	6	7	8	9	10	11	12	Final
Northern Ontario (Wark)	2	1	4	0	2	2	0	3	0	4	0	3	21
Prince Edward Island (MacDonald)	0	0	0	1	0	0	1	0	2	0	1	0	5

=== Draw 11 ===
Friday, March 6 3:00 PM

Sheet A	1	2	3	4	5	6	7	8	9	10	11	12	Final
Newfoundland (Fisher)	3	0	2	2	1	0	2	1	1	0	4	0	16
Prince Edward Island (MacDonald)	0	0	0	0	0	2	0	0	0	1	0	1	4

Sheet B	1	2	3	4	5	6	7	8	9	10	11	12	Final
Saskatchewan (Richardson)	1	0	1	0	1	0	1	0	2	0	0	1	7
Manitoba (Bird)	0	2	0	1	0	1	0	3	0	1	1	0	9

Sheet C	1	2	3	4	5	6	7	8	9	10	11	12	Final
Quebec (Bergmann)	0	0	0	1	1	0	0	1	0	0	3	0	6
New Brunswick (McCully)	1	2	2	0	0	3	1	0	2	2	0	5	18

Sheet D	1	2	3	4	5	6	7	8	9	10	11	12	Final
Ontario (Seller)	2	0	0	0	2	3	2	0	1	0	0	0	10
British Columbia (Naimark)	0	0	2	1	0	0	0	2	0	2	1	0	8

Sheet E	1	2	3	4	5	6	7	8	9	10	11	12	Final
Alberta (Olson)	2	0	2	0	0	2	2	0	1	1	0	1	11
Northern Ontario (Wark)	0	1	0	1	2	0	0	1	0	0	1	0	6

== Playoff ==
Friday, March 6

Sheet C	1	2	3	4	5	6	7	8	9	10	11	12	Final
Saskatchewan (Richardson)	0	3	0	1	3	0	3	0	1	0	1	0	12
Alberta (Olson)	1	0	1	0	0	1	0	2	0	1	0	0	6
