= 1960 Macdonald Brier =

Canadian men's curling championship

- Host city: Fort William, Ontario
- Arena: Fort William Gardens
- Dates: March 7–11
- Attendance: 26,000
- Winner: Saskatchewan
- Curling club: Regina CSC, Regina
- Skip: Ernie Richardson
- Third: Arnold Richardson
- Second: Garnet Richardson
- Lead: Wes Richardson

The 1960 Macdonald Brier, the Canadian men's national curling championship, was held from March 7 to 11, 1960 at Fort William Gardens in Fort William, Ontario. A total of 26,000 fans attended the event.

Team Saskatchewan, skipped by Ernie Richardson, captured the Brier Tankard with a record of 9–1 in round robin play. This was the third time in which Saskatchewan had captured the Brier championship. Richardson became the third skip to win back-to-back Brier championships, joining Gordon Hudson (1928 and 1929) and Matt Baldwin (1957 and 1958). Unlike Hudson and Baldwin before him, Richardson's rink was the first to win back-to-back Briers with the same four team members.

Richardson's rink would go on to compete in the 1960 Scotch Cup in Scotland, becoming World Champions by defeating Scotland 5 games to none for the second year in a row.

== Teams ==
The teams are listed as follows:

Alberta	British Columbia	Manitoba	New Brunswick
Calgary CC, Calgary Skip: Stu Beagle; Third: Jimmy Shields; Second: Ronald Baker; Lead: Fred Storey	Duncan CC, Duncan Skip: Glen Harper; Third: Harvey Hodge; Second: Frederick Duncan; Lead: Vernon Kaspick	Strathcona CC, Winnipeg Skip: MacCabe Scales; Third: George Landrum; Second: John McCorrister; Lead: Lloyd Goodman	Moncton CA, Moncton Skip: Harold Mabey Sr. Third: Harold Mabey Jr. Second: Harold Keith; Lead: Ronald Lewis
Newfoundland	Northern Ontario	Nova Scotia	Ontario
Goose Bay CC, Goose Bay Skip: John-David Lyon; Third: Harry Stanley; Second: Reginald Goldburg; Lead: James Tulley	Granite CC, Sudbury Skip: Don Groom; Third: Arthur Silver; Second: Bill Groom; Lead: Alan Armstrong	Glooscap CC, Kentville Skip: Ian Baird; Third: George Hansen; Second: Robert Mann; Lead: Duncan Smith	Kingston CC, Kingston Skip: Jack Edwards; Third: Robert Elliott; Second: Joseph Corkey; Lead: George Binnington
Prince Edward Island	Quebec	Saskatchewan
Charlottetown CC, Charlottetown Skip: Douglas Cameron; Third: George Dillon; Second: Allison Saunders; Lead: Arnold Llewellyn	Lachine CC, Lachine Skip: Ernest Hunt; Third: Gordon Cape; Second: Rolf Hoppe; Lead: Arthur Lamb	Regina CSC, Regina Skip: Ernie Richardson; Third: Arnold Richardson; Second: Garnet Richardson; Lead: Wes Richardson

== Round-robin standings ==
Key
Brier Champion

Province	Skip	W	L	PF	PA
Saskatchewan	Ernie Richardson	9	1	125	56
Manitoba	MacCabe Scales	8	2	98	82
Alberta	Stu Beagle	8	2	104	67
Ontario	Jack Edwards	7	3	99	91
Prince Edward Island	Douglas Cameron	6	4	92	88
Quebec	Ernest Hunt	5	5	93	92
British Columbia	Glen Harper	3	7	80	91
Northern Ontario	Don Groom	3	7	82	94
Nova Scotia	Ian Baird	3	7	70	96
New Brunswick	Harold Mabey Sr.	2	8	76	105
Newfoundland	John-David Lyon	1	9	75	132

== Round-robin results ==
All draw times are listed in Eastern Time (UTC-05:00)

=== Draw 1 ===
Monday, March 7 3:00 PM

Sheet A	1	2	3	4	5	6	7	8	9	10	11	12	Final
Saskatchewan (Richardson)	0	1	0	0	1	3	0	5	0	3	0	4	17
Manitoba (Scales)	1	0	1	0	0	0	1	0	1	0	1	0	5

Sheet B	1	2	3	4	5	6	7	8	9	10	11	12	Final
New Brunswick (Mabey)	2	0	0	0	4	1	0	0	2	1	0	2	12
Quebec (Hunt)	0	1	1	3	0	0	2	5	0	0	4	0	16

Sheet C	1	2	3	4	5	6	7	8	9	10	11	12	Final
Northern Ontario (Groom)	1	3	0	0	0	3	0	1	0	1	0	0	9
Nova Scotia (Baird)	0	0	1	2	1	0	1	0	2	0	0	3	10

Sheet D	1	2	3	4	5	6	7	8	9	10	11	12	Final
Alberta (Beagle)	4	0	2	1	0	1	0	0	0	2	0	2	12
Ontario (Edwards)	0	1	0	0	1	0	1	1	1	0	1	0	6

Sheet E	1	2	3	4	5	6	7	8	9	10	11	12	13	Final
Prince Edward Island (Cameron)	2	1	0	0	1	0	0	2	2	0	0	0	0	8
Newfoundland (Lyon)	0	0	1	1	0	1	1	0	0	1	1	2	1	9

=== Draw 2 ===
Monday, March 7 8:00 PM

Sheet A	1	2	3	4	5	6	7	8	9	10	11	12	Final
Saskatchewan (Richardson)	2	1	2	3	3	0	1	3	1	0	0	3	19
Northern Ontario (Groom)	0	0	0	0	0	1	0	0	0	1	1	0	3

Sheet B	1	2	3	4	5	6	7	8	9	10	11	12	Final
New Brunswick (Mabey)	0	0	0	1	0	0	2	0	0	1	0	1	5
Alberta (Beagle)	0	0	1	0	1	1	0	1	4	0	1	0	9

Sheet C	1	2	3	4	5	6	7	8	9	10	11	12	Final
British Columbia (Harper)	3	0	1	0	0	1	0	0	0	0	0	1	6
Ontario (Edwards)	0	1	0	3	0	0	1	0	1	0	2	0	8

Sheet D	1	2	3	4	5	6	7	8	9	10	11	12	Final
Newfoundland (Lyon)	1	0	4	0	1	0	0	3	3	1	0	0	13
Quebec (Hunt)	0	4	0	3	0	1	4	0	0	0	2	1	15

Sheet E	1	2	3	4	5	6	7	8	9	10	11	12	Final
Prince Edward Island (Cameron)	0	1	2	1	0	1	0	1	0	3	0	1	10
Nova Scotia (Baird)	2	0	0	0	1	0	1	0	3	0	1	0	8

=== Draw 3 ===
Tuesday, March 8 9:00 AM

Sheet A	1	2	3	4	5	6	7	8	9	10	11	12	Final
Newfoundland (Lyon)	1	0	0	0	1	1	0	1	0	0	2	0	6
Alberta (Beagle)	0	3	1	1	0	0	5	0	4	1	0	2	17

Sheet B	1	2	3	4	5	6	7	8	9	10	11	12	Final
Quebec (Hunt)	0	1	0	1	0	0	0	0	2	1	0	3	8
Nova Scotia (Baird)	2	0	1	0	1	1	1	1	0	0	4	0	11

Sheet C	1	2	3	4	5	6	7	8	9	10	11	12	Final
Manitoba (Scales)	1	0	1	0	1	1	0	0	0	3	1	0	8
Northern Ontario (Groom)	0	1	0	1	0	0	1	0	1	0	0	1	5

Sheet D	1	2	3	4	5	6	7	8	9	10	11	12	Final
British Columbia (Harper)	0	0	0	2	1	0	0	1	0	2	1	1	8
New Brunswick (Mabey)	1	1	0	0	0	2	0	0	3	0	0	0	7

Sheet E	1	2	3	4	5	6	7	8	9	10	11	12	Final
Prince Edward Island (Cameron)	0	1	0	1	0	1	0	0	1	0	2	1	7
Saskatchewan (Richardson)	2	0	4	0	1	0	2	2	0	1	0	0	12

=== Draw 4 ===
Tuesday, March 8 2:00 PM

Sheet A	1	2	3	4	5	6	7	8	9	10	11	12	Final
Quebec (Hunt)	0	0	1	0	1	0	0	2	1	0	0	0	5
Saskatchewan (Richardson)	1	0	0	2	0	2	0	0	0	2	0	1	8

Sheet B	1	2	3	4	5	6	7	8	9	10	11	12	Final
Newfoundland (Lyon)	0	0	1	0	1	0	1	0	1	0	0	1	5
British Columbia (Harper)	3	2	0	4	0	1	0	4	0	1	1	0	16

Sheet C	1	2	3	4	5	6	7	8	9	10	11	12	Final
Manitoba (Scales)	0	1	0	1	0	3	2	0	3	0	3	0	13
Prince Edward Island (Cameron)	1	0	1	0	2	0	0	1	0	1	0	3	9

Sheet D	1	2	3	4	5	6	7	8	9	10	11	12	Final
Nova Scotia (Baird)	0	0	1	0	0	0	0	1	0	1	0	1	4
Alberta (Beagle)	2	2	0	2	1	1	0	0	1	0	2	0	11

Sheet E	1	2	3	4	5	6	7	8	9	10	11	12	Final
Ontario (Edwards)	1	0	2	0	2	0	1	0	3	0	0	1	10
New Brunswick (Mabey)	0	1	0	2	0	2	0	1	0	1	1	0	8

=== Draw 5 ===
Wednesday, March 9 3:00 PM

Sheet A	1	2	3	4	5	6	7	8	9	10	11	12	Final
Nova Scotia (Baird)	1	0	0	0	1	0	1	0	0	1	1	0	5
British Columbia (Harper)	0	0	1	0	0	3	0	2	0	0	0	2	8

Sheet B	1	2	3	4	5	6	7	8	9	10	11	12	Final
Alberta (Beagle)	0	0	0	0	2	0	0	0	1	0	0	1	4
Saskatchewan (Richardson)	0	0	0	1	0	1	2	1	0	2	1	0	8

Sheet C	1	2	3	4	5	6	7	8	9	10	11	12	Final
Northern Ontario (Groom)	0	1	0	1	0	1	0	1	0	1	0	1	6
Prince Edward Island (Cameron)	1	0	2	0	1	0	1	0	2	0	1	0	8

Sheet D	1	2	3	4	5	6	7	8	9	10	11	12	Final
Quebec (Hunt)	1	0	0	1	0	0	0	0	1	1	0	1	5
Manitoba (Scales)	0	0	1	0	1	3	2	0	0	0	1	0	8

Sheet E	1	2	3	4	5	6	7	8	9	10	11	12	Final
Ontario (Edwards)	2	2	0	3	0	0	2	0	0	2	0	2	13
Newfoundland (Lyon)	0	0	2	0	1	2	0	1	1	0	2	0	9

=== Draw 6 ===
Wednesday, March 9 8:00 PM

Sheet A	1	2	3	4	5	6	7	8	9	10	11	12	Final
Saskatchewan (Richardson)	2	0	0	0	2	3	0	1	0	1	0	3	12
British Columbia (Harper)	0	2	1	0	0	0	2	0	2	0	1	0	8

Sheet B	1	2	3	4	5	6	7	8	9	10	11	12	Final
Northern Ontario (Groom)	0	1	1	1	0	0	0	2	0	1	0	0	6
Quebec (Hunt)	2	0	0	0	1	1	2	0	1	0	3	1	11

Sheet C	1	2	3	4	5	6	7	8	9	10	11	12	Final
New Brunswick (Mabey)	2	0	1	0	3	0	0	1	2	1	0	0	10
Newfoundland (Lyon)	0	1	0	1	0	2	1	0	0	0	2	1	8

Sheet D	1	2	3	4	5	6	7	8	9	10	11	12	Final
Nova Scotia (Baird)	0	0	2	0	0	1	2	0	1	0	0	1	7
Ontario (Edwards)	0	1	0	4	1	0	0	2	0	0	2	0	10

Sheet E	1	2	3	4	5	6	7	8	9	10	11	12	Final
Alberta (Beagle)	0	0	3	0	0	2	1	0	1	0	0	0	7
Manitoba (Scales)	2	2	0	1	0	0	0	1	0	1	2	2	11

=== Draw 7 ===
Thursday, March 10 9:00 AM

Sheet A	1	2	3	4	5	6	7	8	9	10	11	12	Final
Prince Edward Island (Cameron)	1	0	2	0	0	2	0	1	0	1	0	2	9
Quebec (Hunt)	0	1	0	1	1	0	0	0	3	0	2	0	8

Sheet B	1	2	3	4	5	6	7	8	9	10	11	12	Final
Saskatchewan (Richardson)	1	0	0	0	1	0	1	0	1	1	0	1	6
Ontario (Edwards)	0	0	4	1	0	1	0	2	0	0	3	0	11

Sheet C	1	2	3	4	5	6	7	8	9	10	11	12	13	Final
British Columbia (Harper)	0	2	0	1	1	0	1	0	2	0	0	2	0	9
Manitoba (Scales)	1	0	1	0	0	2	0	1	0	2	2	0	1	10

Sheet D	1	2	3	4	5	6	7	8	9	10	11	12	13	Final
New Brunswick (Mabey)	1	0	2	0	1	0	0	1	0	1	1	0	3	10
Nova Scotia (Baird)	0	1	0	1	0	1	2	0	1	0	0	1	0	7

Sheet E	1	2	3	4	5	6	7	8	9	10	11	12	13	Final
Alberta (Beagle)	0	0	3	0	2	1	0	0	0	1	1	0	1	9
Northern Ontario (Groom)	0	3	0	2	0	0	0	1	1	0	0	1	0	8

=== Draw 8 ===
Thursday, March 10 3:00 PM

Sheet A	1	2	3	4	5	6	7	8	9	10	11	12	Final
Saskatchewan (Richardson)	2	0	0	1	2	0	0	0	0	2	0	2	9
New Brunswick (Mabey)	0	3	0	0	0	0	1	0	0	0	1	0	5

Sheet B	1	2	3	4	5	6	7	8	9	10	11	12	Final
British Columbia (Harper)	0	0	0	1	0	2	0	1	0	0	2	0	6
Northern Ontario (Groom)	4	1	1	0	1	0	1	0	0	2	0	1	11

Sheet C	1	2	3	4	5	6	7	8	9	10	11	12	Final
Prince Edward Island (Cameron)	1	0	1	0	1	0	0	2	0	0	1	0	6
Alberta (Beagle)	0	3	0	1	0	1	0	0	3	1	0	0	9

Sheet D	1	2	3	4	5	6	7	8	9	10	11	12	Final
Newfoundland (Lyon)	0	0	1	0	1	0	1	0	1	0	1	0	5
Nova Scotia (Baird)	1	2	0	2	0	1	0	3	0	1	0	2	12

Sheet E	1	2	3	4	5	6	7	8	9	10	11	12	Final
Manitoba (Scales)	0	1	0	1	0	2	0	1	0	1	2	0	8
Ontario (Edwards)	1	0	2	0	1	0	2	0	3	0	0	1	10

=== Draw 9 ===
Thursday, March 10 8:00 PM

Sheet A	1	2	3	4	5	6	7	8	9	10	11	12	Final
Newfoundland (Lyon)	0	0	0	2	0	1	0	0	0	1	0	1	5
Saskatchewan (Richardson)	1	4	3	0	4	0	2	2	1	0	4	0	21

Sheet B	1	2	3	4	5	6	7	8	9	10	11	12	Final
British Columbia (Harper)	0	1	0	2	0	1	0	0	0	0	2	1	7
Prince Edward Island (Cameron)	1	0	3	0	2	0	1	1	1	1	0	0	10

Sheet C	1	2	3	4	5	6	7	8	9	10	11	12	Final
Quebec (Hunt)	0	2	0	1	0	1	0	1	0	1	0	1	7
Alberta (Beagle)	2	0	1	0	1	0	3	0	1	0	2	0	10

Sheet D	1	2	3	4	5	6	7	8	9	10	11	12	Final
Manitoba (Scales)	1	0	2	0	0	2	0	3	1	3	0	0	12
New Brunswick (Mabey)	0	1	0	2	1	0	2	0	0	0	1	1	8

Sheet E	1	2	3	4	5	6	7	8	9	10	11	12	Final
Ontario (Edwards)	2	0	0	2	0	2	0	3	0	2	0	0	11
Northern Ontario (Groom)	0	0	1	0	3	0	1	0	2	0	1	1	9

=== Draw 10 ===
Friday, March 11 9:30 AM

Sheet A	1	2	3	4	5	6	7	8	9	10	11	12	Final
Quebec (Hunt)	0	2	0	1	2	0	0	0	0	1	0	1	7
British Columbia (Harper)	0	0	1	0	0	0	2	0	2	0	1	0	6

Sheet B	1	2	3	4	5	6	7	8	9	10	11	12	Final
Northern Ontario (Groom)	4	4	0	2	1	1	0	0	2	0	1	1	16
New Brunswick (Mabey)	0	0	1	0	0	0	1	2	0	2	0	0	6

Sheet C	1	2	3	4	5	6	7	8	9	10	11	12	Final
Nova Scotia (Baird)	0	1	0	0	0	0	0	1	0	0	1	0	3
Saskatchewan (Richardson)	1	0	0	2	2	0	0	0	4	1	0	3	13

Sheet D	1	2	3	4	5	6	7	8	9	10	11	12	Final
Manitoba (Scales)	1	0	0	0	2	0	4	2	2	0	0	0	11
Newfoundland (Lyon)	0	1	2	2	0	2	0	0	0	1	0	1	9

Sheet E	1	2	3	4	5	6	7	8	9	10	11	12	Final
Ontario (Edwards)	0	0	2	1	0	0	3	2	0	2	1	0	11
Prince Edward Island (Cameron)	3	3	0	0	1	3	0	0	3	0	0	2	15

=== Draw 11 ===
Friday, March 11 3:00 PM

Sheet A	1	2	3	4	5	6	7	8	9	10	11	12	Final
Alberta (Beagle)	2	0	0	2	3	1	0	1	2	0	4	1	16
British Columbia (Harper)	0	1	0	0	0	0	3	0	0	2	0	0	6

Sheet B	1	2	3	4	5	6	7	8	9	10	11	12	Final
Northern Ontario (Groom)	1	2	1	0	2	1	0	1	0	1	0	0	9
Newfoundland (Lyon)	0	0	0	1	0	0	1	0	2	0	1	1	6

Sheet C	1	2	3	4	5	6	7	8	9	10	11	12	Final
Nova Scotia (Baird)	0	0	0	1	0	0	0	1	0	0	1	0	3
Manitoba (Scales)	1	1	1	0	1	1	1	0	3	2	0	1	12

Sheet D	1	2	3	4	5	6	7	8	9	10	11	12	Final
New Brunswick (Mabey)	0	2	0	1	0	0	1	0	1	0	0	0	5
Prince Edward Island (Cameron)	1	0	1	0	1	2	0	1	0	1	2	1	10

Sheet E	1	2	3	4	5	6	7	8	9	10	11	12	13	Final
Ontario (Edwards)	0	0	2	0	0	1	0	1	2	1	0	2	0	9
Quebec (Hunt)	1	4	0	0	1	0	2	0	0	0	1	0	2	11
