= Alex Torrance =

Alex Torrance may refer to:

- Sandy Torrance (Alexander Torrance, 1901–1941), Scottish footballer
- Alex A. Torrance ("Big Alex"), Scottish curler
- Alex F. Torrance ("Wee Alex"), Scottish curler
