= Billy Martin (curler) =

Canadian curler (born c.1933)

- Curler
- Born: c. 1933 (age 92–93)
Medal record
Representing Canada
World Curling Championships
Silver medal – second place	1973 Regina
Representing Saskatchewan
Macdonald Brier
Gold medal – first place	1973 Edmonton

William D. Martin (born c. 1933) is a Canadian former curler. He played third on the 1973 Brier Champion team (skipped by Harvey Mazinke), representing Saskatchewan. They later went on to win second place at the World Championships of that year.
