= Dan Klippenstein =

Canadian curler (1939–1997)

- Curler
- Born: September 30, 1939; Avonlea, Saskatchewan
- Died: February 15, 1997 (aged 57); Regina, Saskatchewan

Curling career
- Brier: 1973, 1975
- World Championship: 1973
Medal record
Representing Canada
World Curling Championships
Silver medal – second place	1973 Regina
Representing Saskatchewan
Macdonald Brier
Gold medal – first place	1973 Edmonton

Daniel N. Klippenstein (September 30, 1939 – February 15, 1997) was a Canadian curler. He played lead on the 1973 Brier Champion team (skipped by Harvey Mazinke), representing Saskatchewan. They later went on to win second place at the World Championships of that year. He was inducted into the Saskatchewan Sports Hall of Fame in 1982.

Klippenstein also played baseball until he was 55 years of age. He died from prostate cancer at the age of 57 in 1997. His grave site is at Trossachs, Saskatchewan. He worked as an Engineering Technician and Supervisor with Environment Canada.
