= Ueli Mülli =

Swiss curler

- Curler ♂

Team
- Curling club: Zürich Crystal CC, Zürich

Curling career
- Member Association: Switzerland
- World Championship: 1 (1975)
Medal record
Curling
World Championships
Gold medal – first place	1975 Perth
Swiss Men's Championship
Gold medal – first place	1975 Genève

Ueli Mülli is a Swiss curler.

He is a 1975 World Men's champion and a 1975 Swiss men's curling champion.

== Teams ==
Season	Skip	Third	Second	Lead	Events
1974–75	Otto Danieli	Roland Schneider	Rolf Gautschi	Ueli Mülli	SMCC 1975 (gold); WCC 1975 (gold)
