= 1973 Macdonald Brier =

- Host city: Edmonton, Alberta
- Arena: Klondike Gardens
- Dates: March 5–11
- Attendance: 37,575
- Winner: Saskatchewan
- Curling club: Regina CC, Regina
- Skip: Harvey Mazinke
- Third: Bill Martin
- Second: George Achtymichuk
- Lead: Dan Klippenstein

The 1973 Macdonald Brier, the Canadian men's national curling championship was held from March 5 to 11, 1973 at the Klondike Gardens in Edmonton, Alberta. The total attendance for the week was 37,575.

The event was memorable for having particularly bad ice conditions, considered by some as the "worst (Brier ice) ever manufactured". There was a great thickness of frost on the ice, which was also dotted by tiny pools of water.

Despite not being considered favourites, Team Saskatchewan, who was skipped by Harvey Mazinke adapted best to the poor ice conditions and captured the Brier tankard as they finished round robin play with a 9–1 record. This was Saskatchewan's sixth Brier title overall and the only title that Mazinke skipped.

Mazinke's rink would go onto represent Canada in the 1973 Air Canada Silver Broom, the men's world curling championship on home soil in Regina, Saskatchewan where they won the silver medal.

This was the first Brier in which teams were allowed to concede games before all ends were complete as long as ten ends were played.

Saskatchewan's 7–5 victory over Manitoba in Draw 5 was the fourth time in Brier history in which a game went into a second extra end. The other three instances were in 1955 and twice in 1965.

The Draw 7 matchup between New Brunswick and Northern Ontario saw five consecutive blank ends beginning in the fourth end, setting a then Brier record for most consecutive blank ends in one game. This remains a Macdonald era record (until 1979) and wouldn't be broken in any Brier until 1989.

== Teams ==
The teams were listed as follows:

Alberta	British Columbia	Manitoba
Fairview CC, Fairview Fourth: Mel Watchorn; Skip: Jim Fox; Second: Terry Watchorn; Lead: Merv Watchorn	Richmond WC, Richmond Skip: Jack Tucker; Third: Bernie Sparkes; Second: Jim Armstrong; Lead: Gerry Peckham	Granite CC, Winnipeg Skip: Danny Fink; Third: Rod Hunter; Second: Jim Pettapiece; Lead: John Hunter
New Brunswick	Newfoundland	Northern Ontario
CFB Curtis Park CC, Chatham Skip: Louis Dugre; Third: Joe Klein; Second: Dave Romkey; Lead: Doug Wiggins	Carol CC, Labrador City Skip: Jim Ward; Third: Mike Brennan; Second: Dick Narduzzi; Lead: Jim Noble	Sudbury CC, Sudbury Skip: Don Harry; Third: Morley Harry; Second: Peter Wong; Lead: Art Mousseau
Nova Scotia	Ontario	Prince Edward Island
Dartmouth CC, Dartmouth Skip: Peter Hope; Third: Jim Florian; Second: Gene Mattatall; Lead: Bob Margeson	Scarboro G&CC, Scarborough Skip: Paul Savage; Third: Bob Thompson; Second: Ed Werenich; Lead: Ron Green	Charlottetown CC, Charlottetown Skip: Bob Dillon; Third: Doug Cameron; Second: John Fortier; Lead: Merrill Wiginton
Quebec	Saskatchewan
Caledonia CC, Westmount Skip: Dave Moon; Third: Andre Emong; Second: Ken Graham; Lead: Claude Coursol	Regina CC, Regina Skip: Harvey Mazinke; Third: Bill Martin; Second: George Achtymichuk; Lead: Dan Klippenstein

== Map of teams ==
Provincial Winners

== Round Robin standings ==
Key
Brier champion

Province	Skip	W	L	PF	PA
Saskatchewan	Harvey Mazinke	9	1	88	58
Ontario	Paul Savage	6	4	93	84
Nova Scotia	Peter Hope	6	4	90	72
British Columbia	Jack Tucker	5	5	89	92
Alberta	Mel Watchorn	5	5	95	81
New Brunswick	Louis Dugre	5	5	66	76
Prince Edward Island	Bob Dillon	5	5	77	92
Newfoundland	Jim Ward	4	6	75	107
Manitoba	Danny Fink	4	6	95	89
Quebec	Dave Moon	3	7	90	91
Northern Ontario	Don Harry	3	7	73	89

== Round Robin Results ==
All draw times are listed in Mountain Standard Time (UTC-07:00).

=== Draw 1 ===
Monday, March 5, 2:30 pm

Sheet A	1	2	3	4	5	6	7	8	9	10	11	12	Final
Nova Scotia (Hope)	0	2	0	0	1	0	0	0	2	0	1	0	6
Saskatchewan (Mazinke)	1	0	1	1	0	1	0	0	0	2	0	1	7

Sheet B	1	2	3	4	5	6	7	8	9	10	11	12	Final
New Brunswick (Dugre)	0	1	1	1	0	0	1	0	0	0	0	X	4
Manitoba (Fink)	2	0	0	0	1	2	0	2	1	0	4	X	12

Sheet C	1	2	3	4	5	6	7	8	9	10	11	12	Final
Ontario (Savage)	2	0	1	0	1	0	1	1	1	0	2	1	10
Alberta (Watchorn)	0	1	0	4	0	1	0	0	0	1	0	0	7

Sheet D	1	2	3	4	5	6	7	8	9	10	11	12	Final
Newfoundland (Ward)	3	3	0	1	0	1	0	0	0	1	2	1	12
Quebec (Moon)	0	0	2	0	3	0	3	2	1	0	0	0	11

Sheet E	1	2	3	4	5	6	7	8	9	10	11	12	Final
Prince Edward Island (Dillon)	0	1	0	1	2	0	0	0	1	1	0	4	10
Northern Ontario (Harry)	1	0	1	0	0	1	0	1	0	0	3	0	7

=== Draw 2 ===
Monday, March 5, 7:30 pm

Sheet A	1	2	3	4	5	6	7	8	9	10	11	12	Final
Newfoundland (Ward)	0	0	1	0	0	1	2	1	0	4	0	2	11
Ontario (Savage)	2	1	0	1	1	0	0	0	1	0	3	0	9

Sheet B	1	2	3	4	5	6	7	8	9	10	11	12	Final
Manitoba (Fink)	3	0	0	1	1	2	3	3	0	2	1	X	16
Northern Ontario (Harry)	0	1	1	0	0	0	0	0	1	0	0	X	3

Sheet C	1	2	3	4	5	6	7	8	9	10	11	12	Final
Prince Edward Island (Dillon)	1	0	0	0	2	1	0	0	0	0	X	X	4
Nova Scotia (Hope)	0	1	1	1	0	0	1	4	2	2	X	X	12

Sheet D	1	2	3	4	5	6	7	8	9	10	11	12	Final
British Columbia (Tucker)	2	0	1	0	1	1	3	0	0	0	1	0	9
Saskatchewan (Mazinke)	0	3	0	1	0	0	0	2	1	2	0	1	10

Sheet E	1	2	3	4	5	6	7	8	9	10	11	12	Final
New Brunswick (Dugre)	2	0	1	2	1	0	0	1	1	0	0	0	8
Alberta (Watchorn)	0	1	0	0	0	1	1	0	0	1	1	2	7

=== Draw 3 ===
Tuesday, March 6, 9:00 am

Sheet A	1	2	3	4	5	6	7	8	9	10	11	12	Final
Prince Edward Island (Dillon)	0	0	0	1	0	0	0	1	0	1	0	X	3
British Columbia (Tucker)	1	0	0	0	2	1	1	0	1	0	1	X	7

Sheet B	1	2	3	4	5	6	7	8	9	10	11	12	13	Final
Alberta (Watchorn)	1	0	0	4	0	0	1	0	2	0	0	1	1	10
Northern Ontario (Harry)	0	0	1	0	0	4	0	2	0	1	1	0	0	9

Sheet C	1	2	3	4	5	6	7	8	9	10	11	12	Final
Newfoundland (Ward)	0	1	0	0	0	2	2	0	0	2	0	X	7
New Brunswick (Dugre)	2	0	1	2	1	0	0	2	1	0	1	X	10

Sheet D	1	2	3	4	5	6	7	8	9	10	11	12	Final
Ontario (Savage)	0	0	0	1	0	1	0	1	0	2	1	X	6
Quebec (Moon)	2	2	2	0	2	0	2	0	1	0	0	X	11

Sheet E	1	2	3	4	5	6	7	8	9	10	11	12	Final
Nova Scotia (Hope)	0	1	0	0	1	0	0	3	0	1	0	X	6
Manitoba (Fink)	2	0	0	1	0	1	2	0	1	0	3	X	10

=== Draw 4 ===
Tuesday, March 6, 2:00 pm

Sheet A	1	2	3	4	5	6	7	8	9	10	11	12	13	Final
New Brunswick (Dugre)	0	1	1	2	1	0	0	2	0	0	0	0	1	8
Quebec (Moon)	2	0	0	0	0	2	0	0	1	1	0	1	0	7

Sheet B	1	2	3	4	5	6	7	8	9	10	11	12	Final
Nova Scotia (Hope)	1	1	1	0	1	1	3	0	0	0	2	X	10
Alberta (Watchorn)	0	0	0	2	0	0	0	1	1	2	0	X	6

Sheet C	1	2	3	4	5	6	7	8	9	10	11	12	Final
British Columbia (Tucker)	1	0	1	1	2	0	1	0	1	0	0	X	7
Manitoba (Fink)	0	2	0	0	0	4	0	0	0	3	2	X	11

Sheet D	1	2	3	4	5	6	7	8	9	10	11	12	13	Final
Prince Edward Island (Dillon)	1	0	1	0	1	0	0	1	0	0	2	1	1	8
Saskatchewan (Mazinke)	0	1	0	2	0	0	1	0	2	1	0	0	0	7

Sheet E	1	2	3	4	5	6	7	8	9	10	11	12	Final
Newfoundland (Ward)	0	1	0	0	1	0	1	0	0	1	X	X	4
Northern Ontario (Harry)	1	0	3	1	0	1	0	2	2	0	X	X	10

=== Draw 5 ===
Wednesday, March 7, 2:00 pm

Sheet A	1	2	3	4	5	6	7	8	9	10	11	12	13	14	Final
Manitoba (Fink)	0	0	0	0	1	0	1	0	1	0	0	2	0	0	5
Saskatchewan (Mazinke)	0	1	0	0	0	1	0	1	0	2	0	0	0	2	7

Sheet B	1	2	3	4	5	6	7	8	9	10	11	12	Final
Newfoundland (Ward)	0	0	2	0	1	0	2	0	1	0	0	X	6
Nova Scotia (Hope)	1	0	0	5	0	1	0	1	0	4	0	X	12

Sheet C	1	2	3	4	5	6	7	8	9	10	11	12	Final
Quebec (Moon)	2	0	1	0	2	0	1	3	2	2	2	X	15
Northern Ontario (Harry)	0	2	0	2	0	1	0	0	0	0	0	X	5

Sheet D	1	2	3	4	5	6	7	8	9	10	11	12	Final
New Brunswick (Dugre)	0	2	1	0	0	1	0	0	0	1	0	X	5
Ontario (Savage)	3	0	0	0	2	0	1	1	1	0	1	X	9

Sheet E	1	2	3	4	5	6	7	8	9	10	11	12	Final
British Columbia (Tucker)	2	0	1	0	0	2	0	0	0	2	0	3	10
Alberta (Watchorn)	0	0	0	1	1	0	2	0	2	0	2	0	8

=== Draw 6 ===
Wednesday, March 7, 7:30 pm

Sheet A	1	2	3	4	5	6	7	8	9	10	11	12	13	Final
Northern Ontario (Harry)	0	0	0	0	2	1	0	0	0	1	2	2	1	9
Ontario (Savage)	0	2	4	0	0	0	0	0	2	0	0	0	0	8

Sheet B	1	2	3	4	5	6	7	8	9	10	11	12	Final
British Columbia (Tucker)	0	0	0	4	1	2	2	0	1	2	0	X	12
Newfoundland (Ward)	0	3	1	0	0	0	0	1	0	0	1	X	6

Sheet C	1	2	3	4	5	6	7	8	9	10	11	12	13	Final
Saskatchewan (Mazinke)	0	0	1	0	2	0	2	0	0	1	2	0	1	9
Alberta (Watchorn)	0	1	0	0	0	3	0	1	1	0	0	2	0	8

Sheet D	1	2	3	4	5	6	7	8	9	10	11	12	Final
Manitoba (Fink)	2	0	0	1	0	0	0	2	0	1	1	X	7
Prince Edward Island (Dillon)	0	1	3	0	2	3	4	0	1	0	0	X	14

Sheet E	1	2	3	4	5	6	7	8	9	10	11	12	Final
Quebec (Moon)	0	1	1	0	0	2	1	0	0	1	1	0	7
Nova Scotia (Hope)	2	0	0	4	1	0	0	1	2	0	0	1	11

=== Draw 7 ===
Thursday, March 8, 2:00 pm

Sheet A	1	2	3	4	5	6	7	8	9	10	11	12	Final
Alberta (Watchorn)	1	4	0	2	0	0	0	0	5	0	2	X	14
Prince Edward Island (Dillon)	0	0	2	0	2	1	1	0	0	2	0	X	8

Sheet B	1	2	3	4	5	6	7	8	9	10	11	12	Final
Quebec (Moon)	0	0	1	1	2	0	1	0	1	2	0	0	8
British Columbia (Tucker)	1	1	0	0	0	2	0	1	0	0	3	2	10

Sheet C	1	2	3	4	5	6	7	8	9	10	11	12	Final
Ontario (Savage)	0	3	0	0	1	0	1	0	2	0	2	1	10
Nova Scotia (Hope)	2	0	0	2	0	1	0	2	0	2	0	0	9

Sheet D	1	2	3	4	5	6	7	8	9	10	11	12	Final
Northern Ontario (Harry)	0	0	2	0	0	0	0	0	0	1	0	0	3
New Brunswick (Dugre)	2	1	0	0	0	0	0	0	1	0	0	1	5

Sheet E	1	2	3	4	5	6	7	8	9	10	11	12	Final
Saskatchewan (Mazinke)	1	0	1	4	0	1	0	2	3	0	1	X	13
Newfoundland (Ward)	0	0	0	0	0	0	2	0	0	1	0	X	3

=== Draw 8 ===
Thursday, March 8, 7:30 pm

Sheet A	1	2	3	4	5	6	7	8	9	10	11	12	13	Final
New Brunswick (Dugre)	1	0	0	1	0	0	2	0	1	0	0	1	1	7
Nova Scotia (Hope)	0	0	1	0	0	1	0	1	0	1	2	0	0	6

Sheet B	1	2	3	4	5	6	7	8	9	10	11	12	Final
Quebec (Moon)	0	0	1	0	0	1	0	1	1	0	0	X	4
Saskatchewan (Mazinke)	1	0	0	0	1	0	3	0	0	2	3	X	10

Sheet C	1	2	3	4	5	6	7	8	9	10	11	12	Final
Newfoundland (Ward)	1	0	1	0	2	0	3	0	4	0	0	X	11
Prince Edward Island (Dillon)	0	1	0	2	0	1	0	1	0	0	2	X	7

Sheet D	1	2	3	4	5	6	7	8	9	10	11	12	Final
Manitoba (Fink)	3	0	1	0	1	0	1	0	0	1	1	0	8
Alberta (Watchorn)	0	1	0	3	0	2	0	2	1	0	0	1	10

Sheet E	1	2	3	4	5	6	7	8	9	10	11	12	13	Final
British Columbia (Tucker)	0	0	1	0	0	3	0	0	2	0	0	3	0	9
Ontario (Savage)	0	1	0	1	2	0	0	1	0	2	2	0	1	10

=== Draw 9 ===
Friday, March 9, 2:00 pm

Sheet A	1	2	3	4	5	6	7	8	9	10	11	12	Final
Manitoba (Fink)	1	0	0	3	0	0	2	0	0	0	0	X	6
Newfoundland (Ward)	0	2	1	0	1	0	0	0	3	4	1	X	12

Sheet B	1	2	3	4	5	6	7	8	9	10	11	12	Final
Ontario (Savage)	1	0	0	1	0	2	0	0	1	0	1	X	6
Saskatchewan (Mazinke)	0	2	1	0	1	0	0	2	0	3	0	X	9

Sheet C	1	2	3	4	5	6	7	8	9	10	11	12	Final
New Brunswick (Dugre)	0	0	0	0	0	2	3	0	0	0	2	0	7
British Columbia (Tucker)	0	2	0	0	2	0	0	2	0	1	0	1	8

Sheet D	1	2	3	4	5	6	7	8	9	10	11	12	Final
Nova Scotia (Hope)	1	1	0	1	1	0	1	0	1	0	1	X	7
Northern Ontario (Harry)	0	0	1	0	0	1	0	2	0	1	0	X	5

Sheet E	1	2	3	4	5	6	7	8	9	10	11	12	Final
Prince Edward Island (Dillon)	3	0	2	0	1	0	0	1	1	0	3	X	11
Quebec (Moon)	0	1	0	2	0	1	2	0	0	1	0	X	7

=== Draw 10 ===
Friday, March 9, 7:30 pm

Sheet A	1	2	3	4	5	6	7	8	9	10	11	12	Final
Northern Ontario (Harry)	0	0	5	1	0	2	4	1	5	0	X	X	18
British Columbia (Tucker)	3	1	0	0	1	0	0	0	0	2	X	X	7

Sheet B	1	2	3	4	5	6	7	8	9	10	11	12	Final
Ontario (Savage)	0	0	0	1	1	1	3	1	4	2	0	X	13
Prince Edward Island (Dillon)	1	0	1	0	0	0	0	0	0	0	2	X	4

Sheet C	1	2	3	4	5	6	7	8	9	10	11	12	Final
Quebec (Moon)	2	1	2	0	0	0	2	0	1	0	3	3	14
Manitoba (Fink)	0	0	0	3	1	1	0	3	0	2	0	0	10

Sheet D	1	2	3	4	5	6	7	8	9	10	11	12	Final
Alberta (Watchorn)	3	0	0	2	0	2	0	4	1	3	2	X	17
Newfoundland (Ward)	0	0	1	0	1	0	1	0	0	0	0	X	3

Sheet E	1	2	3	4	5	6	7	8	9	10	11	12	Final
Saskatchewan (Mazinke)	0	1	0	0	0	0	2	0	0	0	3	3	9
New Brunswick (Dugre)	1	0	1	0	0	1	0	0	0	2	0	0	5

=== Draw 11 ===
Saturday, March 10, 11:00 am

Sheet A	1	2	3	4	5	6	7	8	9	10	11	12	Final
Alberta (Watchorn)	1	0	2	0	0	0	3	0	2	0	0	X	8
Quebec (Moon)	0	2	0	0	0	1	0	1	0	1	1	X	6

Sheet B	1	2	3	4	5	6	7	8	9	10	11	12	Final
Prince Edward Island (Dillon)	1	1	1	0	1	1	0	3	0	0	0	0	8
New Brunswick (Dugre)	0	0	0	1	0	0	1	0	0	3	1	1	7

Sheet C	1	2	3	4	5	6	7	8	9	10	11	12	Final
Saskatchewan (Mazinke)	1	0	0	1	0	2	1	0	1	1	0	X	7
Northern Ontario (Harry)	0	0	1	0	1	0	0	1	0	0	1	X	4

Sheet D	1	2	3	4	5	6	7	8	9	10	11	12	Final
Nova Scotia (Hope)	0	2	1	0	0	2	0	1	0	0	2	3	11
British Columbia (Tucker)	3	0	0	1	2	0	2	0	1	1	0	0	10

Sheet E	1	2	3	4	5	6	7	8	9	10	11	12	Final
Ontario (Savage)	0	3	1	0	3	0	1	0	3	1	0	X	12
Manitoba (Fink)	0	0	0	4	0	3	0	2	0	0	1	X	10

== Awards ==
=== All-Star Team ===
The media selected the following curlers as All-Stars.

Position	Name	Team
Skip	Harvey Mazinke	Saskatchewan
Third	Bill Martin	Saskatchewan
Second	Dave Romkey	New Brunswick
Lead	Ron Green	Ontario

=== Ross G.L. Harstone Award ===
The Ross Harstone Award was presented to the player chosen by their fellow peers as the curler who best represented Harstone's high ideals of good sportsmanship, observance of the rules, exemplary conduct and curling ability.

Name	Team	Position
Mel Watchorn	Alberta	Skip
