= John Aasand =

American curler

- Curler ♂

Team
- Curling club: Grafton CC, Grafton, ND

Curling career
- Member Association: United States
- World Championship: 1 (1972)
Medal record
Curling
World Championships
Silver medal – second place	1972 Garmisch-Partenkirchen
United States Men's Championship
Gold medal – first place	1972 Wilmette

John Aasand (born c. 1950) is an American curler, a 1972 World Men's silver medallist and a 1972 United States men's curling champion.

That 1972 silver medallist team is best known for the "Curse of LaBonte" - one of the most famous curses in curling history. It was caused by an incident at the finals of the 1972 world men's curling championship, the 1972 Air Canada Silver Broom in Garmisch-Partenkirchen, Germany.

== Personal life ==
Aasand attended the University of North Dakota. He is the owner of a sportsbar in Grafton named "The Extra End", an allusion to the team's extra end loss at the 1972 Worlds. He is married and has one daughter.

== Teams ==
Season	Skip	Third	Second	Lead	Events
1971–72	Robert LaBonte	Frank Aasand	John Aasand	Ray Morgan	USMCC 1972 (gold); WCC 1972 (silver)
