= Achtymichuk =

Achtymichuk (Ukrainian: Ахтимічук) is a Ukrainian surname. Notable people with the surname include:

- Gene Achtymichuk (1932–2024), Canadian ice hockey player
- George Achtymichuk (born c. 1935), Canadian curler
