= Ray Morgan (curler) =

American curler

- Curler ♂

Team
- Curling club: Grafton CC, Grafton, ND

Curling career
- Member Association: United States
- World Championship: 1 (1972)
Medal record
Curling
World Championships
Silver medal – second place	1972 Garmisch-Partenkirchen
United States Men's Championship
Gold medal – first place	1972 Wilmette

Ray Morgan is an American curler, a 1972 World Men's silver medallist and a 1972 United States men's curling champion.

That 1972 silver medallist team is best known for the "Curse of LaBonte" - one of the most famous curses in curling history. It was caused by an incident at the finals of the 1972 world men's curling championship, the 1972 Air Canada Silver Broom in Garmisch-Partenkirchen, Germany.

He also won the United States Mixed Curling Championship.

== Personal life ==
Morgan attended the University of North Dakota.

== Teams ==
=== Men's ===
Season	Skip	Third	Second	Lead	Events
1971–72	Robert LaBonte	Frank Aasand	John Aasand	Ray Morgan	USMCC 1972 (gold); WCC 1972 (silver)

=== Mixed ===
Season	Skip	Third	Second	Lead	Events
1976	Frank Aasand	Paddy Hankey	Ray Morgan	Vicky Aasand	USMxCC 1976 (gold)
