= Roland Schneider =

Swiss curler

- Curler ♂

Team
- Curling club: Zürich Crystal CC, Zürich, Bern-Zähringer CC, Bern

Curling career
- Member Association: Switzerland
- World Championship: 2 (1975, 1978)
- European Championship: 1 (1975)
Medal record
Curling
World Championships
Gold medal – first place	1975 Perth
Swiss Men's Championship
Gold medal – first place	1975 Genève
Gold medal – first place	1978 Lausanne

Roland Schneider is a Swiss curler.

He is a 1975 World Men's champion and a two-time Swiss men's curling champion (1975, 1978).

== Teams ==
Season	Skip	Third	Second	Lead	Events
1974–75	Otto Danieli	Roland Schneider	Rolf Gautschi	Ueli Mülli	SMCC 1975 (gold); WCC 1975 (gold)
1975–76	Roland Schneider	Michael Müller	Denis Schneider	Rolf Gautschi	ECC 1975 (5th)
1977–78	Fred Collioud	Roland Schneider	René Collioud	Kurt Schneider	SMCC 1978 (gold); WCC 1978 (7th)
