= Dave Tellvik =

American curler

- Curler ♂

Team
- Curling club: Granite CC, Seattle, Washington

Curling career
- Member Association: United States
- World Championship: 1 (1975)
Medal record
Curling
World Championships
Silver medal – second place	1975 Perth
United States Men's Championship
Gold medal – first place	1975 Detroit

Dave Tellvik is an American curler.

Tellvik competed at the United States Men's Championship seven times, winning it once in 1975. That earned them the chance to represent the United States at the 1975 World Men's Championship. At World's in Perth, Scotland they earned the silver medal when they lost to Otto Danieli's Team Switzerland.

== Teams ==
Season	Skip	Third	Second	Lead	Events
1974–75	Ed Risling	Charles Lundgren	Gary Schnee	Dave Tellvik	USMCC 1975 (gold); WCC 1975 (silver)
