= Magie =

Magie may refer to:

- Bob Magie Jr., American curler
- David Magie (1877–1960), American historian
- Elizabeth Magie (1866–1948), American game designer
- William Francis Magie (1858–1943), American physicist, a founder of the American Physical Society
- Magie Dominic (born 1944), Canadian poet and artist from Corner Brook, Newfoundland and Labrador
- Magie, a 1994 album by Koffi Olomide
- Magie, a 2023 album by Camille Dhont
- "Magie", a 2024 song by Band-Maid from Epic Narratives
