= Renato Ghezze =

Italian male curler

- Curler ♂
- Born: 30 January 1936 (age 90); Cortina d'Ampezzo

Team
- Curling club: CC Cortina, Cortina d'Ampezzo

Curling career
- Member Association: Italy
- World Championship: 2 (1973, 1974)
Medal record
Curling

Renato Ghezze (born 30 January 1936 in Cortina d'Ampezzo) is an Italian curler.

== Teams ==
Season	Skip	Third	Second	Lead	Events
1972–73	Renato Ghezze	Paolo da Ros	Lino Mariani Maier	Andrea Pavani	WCC 1973 (9th)
1973–74	Renato Ghezze	Lino Mariani Maier	Roberto Zangara	Andrea Pavani	WCC 1974 (10th)
