= Dennis Melland =

American curler

- Curler ♂

Team
- Curling club: Edmore CC, Grafton, ND

Curling career
- Member Association: United States
- World Championship: 1 (1971)
Medal record
Curling
World Championships
Bronze medal – third place	1971 Megève
United States Men's Championship
Gold medal – first place	1971 Duluth

Dennis Melland is an American curler, 1971 World Men's bronze medallist and a 1971 United States men's curling champion.

== Teams ==
Season	Skip	Third	Second	Lead	Events
1970–71	Dale Dalziel	Dennis Melland	Clark Sampson	Rodney Melland	USMCC 1971 (gold); WCC 1971 (bronze)

== Personal life ==
His brother Rodney is also a curler and Dennis' teammate.
