= Werner Oswald =

Swiss curler

- Curler ♂

Team
- Curling club: CC Zug, Zug

Curling career
- Member Association: Switzerland
- World Championship: 2 (1971, 1973)
Medal record
Curling
Swiss Men's Championship
Gold medal – first place	1971 Genève
Gold medal – first place	1973 Bern

Werner Oswald is a former Swiss curler.

At the national level, he is a two-time Swiss men's champion curler. He competed for Switzerland in two World championships.

== Teams ==
Season	Skip	Third	Second	Lead	Events
1970—71	Cesare Canepa	Werner Oswald	Jakob Kluser	Hans-Ruedi Werren	SMCC 1971 (gold); WCC 1971 (4th)
1972—73	Werner Oswald	Cesare Canepa	Rolph Oswald	Hans-Ruedi Werren	SMCC 1973 (gold); WCC 1973 (5th)
