= Gerold Keller =

Swiss curler

- Curler ♂

Team
- Curling club: CC Rigi-Kaltbad, Küssnacht am Rigi

Curling career
- Member Association: Switzerland
- World Championship: 1 (1964)
Medal record
Curling
Swiss Men's Championship
Gold medal – first place	1962 Champéry
Gold medal – first place	1963 Kandersteg
Gold medal – first place	1964 Flims

Gerold Keller is a former Swiss curler.

At the international level, he skipped Swiss men's team on 1964 World Men's Championship (Swiss team finished sixth).

At the national level, he is a three-time Swiss men's champion curler (1962, 1963, 1964).

== Teams ==
Season	Skip	Third	Second	Lead	Events
1961–62	Gerold Keller	Franz Zimmermann	Georg Rageth	Alois Zimmerman	SMCC 1962 (gold)
1962–63	Gerold Keller	Franz Zimmermann	Alois Zimmerman	Franz Gernet	SMCC 1963 (gold)
1963–64	Gerold Keller	Franz Zimmermann	Walter Eleganti	Alois Zimmerman	SMCC 1964 (gold)
1963–64	Gerold Keller	Franz Zimmermann	Alois Zimmerman	Franz Gernet	WCC 1964 (6th)
