= Iain Baxter (curler) =

Scottish curler

- Curler ♂
- Born: 4 December 1948; Corstorphine
- Died: 29 July 2015 (aged 66); Edinburgh

Team
- Curling club: Corstorphine CC, Corstorphine; Oxenfoord CC, Edinburgh

Curling career
- Member Association: Scotland
- World Championship: 2 (1971, 1978)
- European Championship: 1 (1978)
- Other appearances: World Senior Championships: 2 (2002, 2003)
Medal record
Curling
World Championship
Silver medal – second place	1971 Megève
Scottish Men's Championship
Gold medal – first place	1971
Gold medal – first place	1978
World Senior Championships
Bronze medal – third place	2003 Winnipeg

Iain Baxter (4 December 1948 – 29 July 2015) was a Scottish curler.

He was a 1971 World Men's silver medallist and a two-time Scottish men's champion (1971, 1978).

He was also 1978 Scottish Mixed Curling champion and two-time Scottish senior men's champion (2002, 2003).

== Teams ==
=== Men's ===
Season	Skip	Third	Second	Lead	Alternate	Events
1970–71	James Sanderson	Willie Sanderson	Iain Baxter	Colin Baxter		SMCC 1971 (gold); WMCC 1971 (silver)
1977–78	James Sanderson	Iain Baxter	Willie Sanderson	Colin Baxter		SMCC 1978 (gold); WMCC 1978 (5th)
1978–79	James Sanderson	Iain Baxter	Colin Baxter	Willie Sanderson		ECC 1978 (4th)
2001–02	Iain Baxter	James Muir	Sandy Brown	Harry Ferguson	Andrew Hepburn (WSCC)	SSCC 2002 (gold); WSCC 2002 (5th)
2002–03	Iain Baxter	James Muir	Sandy Brown	Harry Ferguson	Andrew Hepburn (WSCC)	SSCC 2003 (gold); WSCC 2003 (bronze)

=== Mixed ===
Season	Skip	Third	Second	Lead	Events
1978	Jimmy Sanderson	Jane Sanderson	Iain Baxter	Helen Baxter	SMxCC 1978 (gold)
1982	Iain Baxter	Christine Wood	Jimmy Wood	Helen Baxter	SMxCC 1982 (silver)

== Personal life ==
His brother Colin is also a curler and Iain's teammate. Their parents, father Bobby and mother Mabel, were curlers too.
