= Russell Barber =

American curler (1911–1996)

- Curler ♂
- Born: May 18, 1911; Duluth, Minnesota, U.S.
- Died: February 18, 1996 (aged 84)

Team
- Curling club: Duluth CC, Duluth, Minnesota

Curling career
- Member Association: United States
- World Championship: 1 (1964)
Medal record
Curling
World Championships
Bronze medal – third place	1964 Calgary
United States Men's Championship
Gold medal – first place	1964 Utica

Russell W. Barber (May 18, 1911 – February 18, 1996) was an American curler.

He is a 1964 World Men's bronze medallist and a 1964 United States men's champion.

Barber was an inspector of detectives.

== Teams ==
Season	Skip	Third	Second	Lead	Events
1954–55	Bob Magie Jr.	Bert Payne	Russ Barber	Tyndal Palmer	
1963–64	Bob Magie Jr.	Bert Payne	Russ Barber	Britton Payne	1964 USMCC (gold); 1964 WMCC (bronze)
1966–67	Bob Magie Jr.	Britton Payne	Mike O’Leary	Russ Barber	1967 USMCC (???th)
