= Fred Britton (curler) =

Canadian curler

- Curler
- Born: August 16, 1932; Headingley, Manitoba
- Died: September 12, 2014 (aged 82); Calgary, Alberta

Curling career
- Brier: 1 (1964)
- World Championship: 1 (1964)
Medal record
Representing Canada
Men's Curling
World championships
Gold medal – first place	1964 Calgary	Team
Macdonald Brier
Representing British Columbia
Gold medal – first place	1964 Charlottetown

Frederick James Britton (August 16, 1932 – September 12, 2014) was a Canadian curler. He played as second on the Lyall Dagg rink that won the 1964 Brier and World Championship. He died in 2014.

== Personal life ==
At the time of the 1964 Worlds, Hebert worked for Canadian Bechtel Ltd.. In addition to curling, his background included ice hockey and softball.
