= Sven Kroken =

Norwegian curler

- Curler ♂
- Born: 29 September 1944 (age 82)

Team
- Curling club: Bærum CC, Oslo

Curling career
- Member Association: Norway
- World Championship: 2 (1971, 1972)
- European Championship: 1 (1975)
Medal record
Curling
European Championships
Gold medal – first place	1975 Megève
Norwegian Men's Championship
Gold medal – first place	1971
Gold medal – first place	1972
Gold medal – first place	1975

Sven Kroken (born 29 September 1944) is a former Norwegian curler.

He is a champion of the first-ever European Curling Championships, played in 1975 and a three-time Norwegian men's curling champion.

== Teams ==
Season	Skip	Third	Second	Lead	Events
1970–71	Knut Bjaanaes	Sven Kroken	Per Dammen	Kjell Ulrichsen	WCC 1971 (6th)
1971–72	Knut Bjaanaes	Sven Kroken	Per Dammen	Kjell Ulrichsen	WCC 1972 (6th)
1975–76	Knut Bjaanaes	Sven Kroken	Helmer Strømbo	Kjell Ulrichsen	ECC 1975 (gold)
