= George Achtymichuk =

Canadian curler (born c.1935)

- Curler
- Born: c. 1935 (age 90–91)

Curling career
- Brier: 2 (1973, 1975)
Medal record
Representing Canada
World Curling Championships
Silver medal – second place	1973 Regina
Representing Saskatchewan
Macdonald Brier
Gold medal – first place	1973 Edmonton

George Achtymichuk (born c. 1935) is a Canadian former curler. He played second on the 1973 Brier Champion team (skipped by Harvey Mazinke), representing Saskatchewan. They later went on to win second place at the World Championships of that year.

As of 1975, he was working as a school teacher in Regina, Saskatchewan and was the leader and bass-guitarist in the band The Melody Mates which included members of his curling team. He grew up in Stoughton, Saskatchewan.
