= Bert Payne =

American curler

- Curler ♂
- Born: July 17, 1909
- Died: May 19, 1998 (aged 88)

Team
- Curling club: Duluth CC, Duluth, Minnesota

Curling career
- Member Association: United States
- World Championship: 1 (1964)
Medal record
Curling
World Championships
Bronze medal – third place	1964 Calgary
United States Men's Championship
Gold medal – first place	1964 Utica

C. Bertram Payne (July 17, 1909 – May 19, 1998) was an American curler.

He was a 1964 World Men's bronze medallist and a 1964 United States men's champion.

The Bert Payne Junior Bonspiel was held in Duluth Curling Club.

Payne was a country club manager.

== Teams ==
Season	Skip	Third	Second	Lead	Events
1944–45	Bert Payne	Bob Magie Jr	Bob Magie Sr	Martin MacLean	
1946–47	Bob Magie Jr	Bert Payne	Bob Magie Sr	W.A. Sanford	
1954–55	Bob Magie Jr	Bert Payne	Russell Barber	Tyndal Palmer	
1963–64	Bob Magie Jr	Bert Payne	Russell Barber	Britton Payne	USMCC 1964 (gold); WCC 1964 (bronze)
