= Tom McGregor =

Scottish male curler

- Curler ♂

Team
- Curling club: Hamilton & Thornyhill CC

Curling career
- Member Association: Scotland
- World Championship: 2 (1973, 1975)
- Other appearances: World Junior Championships: 1 (1977)
Medal record
Curling
Scottish Men's Championship
Gold medal – first place	1973
Gold medal – first place	1975

Tom McGregor is a Scottish curler.

At the national level, he is a two-time Scottish men's champion and one-time Scottish junior champion.

== Teams ==
Season	Skip	Third	Second	Lead	Events
1972–73	Alex F. Torrance	Alex A. Torrance	Tom McGregor	Willie Kerr	SMCC 1973 (gold); WCC 1973 (4th)
1974–75	Alex F. Torrance	Alex A. Torrance	Tom McGregor	Willie Kerr	SMCC 1975 (gold); WCC 1975 (5th)
1976–77	Lockhart Steele	Gavin Wiseman	Tom McGregor	Archibald Craig	SJCC 1977 (gold); WJCC 1977 (7th)
