= Per Dammen =

Norwegian male curler

- Curler ♂
- Born: 11 June 1946 (age 80)

Team
- Curling club: Stabekk CC, Bærum, Bærum CC, Bærum

Curling career
- Member Association: Norway
- World Championship: 4 (1970, 1971, 1972, 1973)
Medal record
Curling

Per Dammen (born 11 June 1946) is a Norwegian curler.

He competed for Norway on four World championships.

== Teams ==
Season	Skip	Third	Second	Lead	Events
1969–70	Knut Bjaanaes (fourth)	Geir Søiland	Per Dammen	Josef Bjaanaes (skip)	WCC 1970 (5th)
1970–71	Knut Bjaanaes	Sven Kroken	Per Dammen	Kjell Ulrichsen	WCC 1971 (6th)
1971–72	Knut Bjaanaes	Sven Kroken	Per Dammen	Kjell Ulrichsen	WCC 1972 (6th)
1972–73	Helmer Strømbo	Per Dammen	Geir Søiland	Øyvinn Fløstrand	WCC 1973 (7th)
