= Ed Risling =

American curler

- Curler ♂

Team
- Curling club: Granite CC, Seattle, Washington

Curling career
- Member Association: United States
- World Championship: 1 (1975)
Medal record
Curling
World Championships
Silver medal – second place	1975 Perth
United States Men's Championship
Gold medal – first place	1975 Detroit

Ed Risling is an American curler.

He is a 1975 World Men's silver medallist and a 1975 United States men's curling champion.

== Teams ==
Season	Skip	Third	Second	Lead	Events
1974–75	Ed Risling	Charles Lundgren	Gary Schnee	Dave Tellvik	USMCC 1975 (gold); WCC 1975 (silver)

== Personal life ==
His son, Dale Risling is a curler too. He is a two-time United States junior champion (1981, 1982).
