= Manfred Räderer =

German curler

- Curler ♂

Team
- Curling club: EC Oberstdorf, Oberstdorf

Curling career
- Member Association: Germany
- World Championship: 4 (1970, 1971, 1972, 1974)
Medal record
Curling
World Championships
Bronze medal – third place	1972 Garmisch-Partenkirchen

Manfred Räderer is a former German curler.

He is a 1972 World Men's bronze medallist.

== Teams ==
Season	Skip	Third	Second	Lead	Events
1969–70	Manfred Räderer	Ernst Hege	Peter Jacoby	Hansjörg Jacoby	WCC 1970 (6th)
1970–71	Manfred Räderer	Peter Jacoby	Peder Ledosquet	Hansjörg Jacoby	WCC 1971 (6th)
1971–72	Manfred Räderer	Peter Jacoby	Peder Ledosquet	Hansjörg Jacoby	WCC 1972 (bronze)
1973–74	Manfred Räderer	Franz Sperger	Hansjörg Jacoby	Roland Liedtke	WCC 1974 (5th)
