= Pierre Boan =

French curler

- Curler
- Born: 12 April 1925

Team
- Curling club: Mont d'Arbois CC, Megève

Curling career
- Member Association: France
- World Championship: 9 (1967, 1968, 1969, 1970, 1971, 1972, 1973, 1977, 1978)
- European Championship: 2 (1975, 1976)
Medal record
Curling
World Championships
| Bronze medal – third place | 1973 Regina |
French Men's Championship
| Gold medal – first place | 1965 |
| Gold medal – first place | 1966 |
| Gold medal – first place | 1968 |
| Gold medal – first place | 1969 |
| Gold medal – first place | 1971 |
| Gold medal – first place | 1972 |
| Gold medal – first place | 1973 |
| Gold medal – first place | 1977 |
| Gold medal – first place | 1978 |

Pierre Boan (born 12 April 1925; possibly died 3 November 2011) was a French curler.

He was a 1973 World Men's bronze medallist and nine-time French men's champion.

== Teams ==
| Season | Skip | Third | Second | Lead | Alternate | Events |
|---|---|---|---|---|---|---|
| 1966–67 | Jean Albert Sulpice | Maurice Sulpice | Phillipe Chambat | Pierre Boan | | WCC 1967 (6th) |
| 1967–68 | Pierre Boan (fourth) | Martino Parodi | Guy Parodi (skip) | Francois Parodi | | WCC 1968 (7th) |
| 1968–69 | Pierre Boan | André Mabboux | Yves Vallet | Richard Duvillard | | WCC 1969 (7th) |
| 1969–70 | Pierre Boan | Jean Albert Sulpice | Alain Bozon | Maurice Sulpice | | WCC 1970 (6th) |
| 1970–71 | Pierre Boan | André Mabboux | André Tronc | Richard Duvillard | Gerard Pasquier | WCC 1971 (6th) |
| 1971–72 | Pierre Boan | André Mabboux | André Tronc | Gerard Pasquier | | WCC 1972 (7th) |
| 1972–73 | Pierre Boan | André Mabboux | André Tronc | Gerard Pasquier | | WCC 1973 (bronze) |
| 1975–76 | Pierre Boan | Jean-Louis Sibuet | Maurice Mercier | Georges Panisset | | ECC 1975 (6th) |
| 1976–77 | Pierre Boan | André Mabboux | Pierre Duclos | Georges Panisset | | ECC 1976 (5th) |
| 1976–77 | Pierre Boan | Pierre Duclos | Honore Brangi | Jean-Claude Gachet | | WCC 1977 (9th) |
| 1977–78 | Pierre Boan | Pierre Duclos | Honore Brangi | Jean-Claude Gachet | | WCC 1978 (7th) |
