= Colin Baxter (curler) =

Scottish curler

- Curler ♂

Team
- Curling club: Corstorphine CC, Corstorphine; Oxenfoord CC, Edinburgh

Curling career
- Member Association: Scotland
- World Championship: 2 (1971, 1978)
- European Championship: 1 (1978)
- Other appearances: World Senior Championships: 2 (2002, 2003)
Medal record
Curling
World Championship
Silver medal – second place	1971 Megève
Scottish Men's Championship
Gold medal – first place	1971
Gold medal – first place	1978

Colin Baxter is a Scottish curler.

He is a 1971 World Men's silver medallist and a two-time Scottish men's champion (1971, 1978).

He was also a two-time Scottish Schools champion (1968, 1969).

== Teams ==
Season	Skip	Third	Second	Lead	Events
1967–68	Colin Baxter	Jimmy Hunter	Peter Welsh	Arthur Hendry	SSchCC 1968 (gold)
1968–69	Colin Baxter	Peter Welsh	Donald Crerar	Arthur Hendry	SSchCC 1969 (gold)
1970–71	James Sanderson	Willie Sanderson	Iain Baxter	Colin Baxter	SMCC 1971 (gold); WMCC 1971 (silver)
1977–78	James Sanderson	Iain Baxter	Willie Sanderson	Colin Baxter	SMCC 1978 (gold); WMCC 1978 (5th)
1978–79	James Sanderson	Iain Baxter	Colin Baxter	Willie Sanderson	ECC 1978 (4th)

== Personal life ==
His brother Iain was also a curler and Colin's teammate. Their parents, father Bobby and mother Mabel, were curlers too.
