= Knut Bjaanaes =

Norwegian curler

- Curler ♂
- Born: June 19, 1948
- Died: 27 February 1994 (aged 45)

Team
- Curling club: Stabæk CC, Oslo, Bærum CC, Oslo

Curling career
- Member Association: Norway
- World Championship: 4 (1970, 1971, 1972, 1975)
- European Championship: 1 (1975)
Medal record
Curling
European Championships
Gold medal – first place	1975 Megève
Norwegian Men's Championship
Gold medal – first place	1970
Gold medal – first place	1971
Gold medal – first place	1972
Gold medal – first place	1975

Knut Bjaanaes (Norwegian: Knut Bjaanæs; 19 June 1948–27 February 1994) was a Norwegian curler.

He was a member of the champion Norwegian team at the first-ever European Curling Championships, played in 1975 and a four-time Norwegian men's curling champion.

== Teams ==
Season	Skip	Third	Second	Lead	Events
1969–70	Knut Bjaanaes (fourth)	Geir Søiland	Per Dammen	Josef Bjaanaes (skip)	WCC 1970 (5th)
1970–71	Knut Bjaanaes	Sven Kroken	Per Dammen	Kjell Ulrichsen	WCC 1971 (6th)
1971–72	Knut Bjaanaes	Sven Kroken	Per Dammen	Kjell Ulrichsen	WCC 1972 (6th)
1974–75	Helmer Strømbo	Knut Bjaanaes	Jan Kolstad	Øyvinn Fløstrand	WCC 1975 (8th)
1975–76	Knut Bjaanaes	Sven Kroken	Helmer Strømbo	Kjell Ulrichsen	ECC 1975 (gold)
