= Gérard Pasquier =

French curler and alpine skier (1929–1995)

Personal information
- Nationality: French
- Born: 1 February 1929 Le Reposoir, France
- Died: 11 March 1995 (aged 66) Mégève, France

Sport
- Sport: Alpine skiing

Gérard Pasquier
- Curler

Team
- Curling club: Mont d'Arbois CC, Megève

Curling career
- Member Association: France
- World Championship: 4 (1971, 1972, 1973, 1976)
Medal record
Curling
World Men's Championships
Bronze medal – third place	1973 Regina

Gérard Pasquier (1 February 1929 – 11 March 1995) was a French alpine skier and curler. As an alpine skier he competed in two events at the 1956 Winter Olympics. He was a 1973 World Men's Curling bronze medallist.

== Curling teams ==
Season	Skip	Third	Second	Lead	Alternate	Events
1970–71	Pierre Boan	André Mabboux	André Tronc	Richard Duvillard	Gérard Pasquier	WCC 1971 (6th)
1971–72	Pierre Boan	André Mabboux	André Tronc	Gérard Pasquier		WCC 1972 (7th)
1972–73	Pierre Boan	André Mabboux	André Tronc	Gérard Pasquier		WCC 1973 (bronze)
1975–76	André Tronc	Gérard Pasquier	Richard Duvillard	Henri Woehrling		WCC 1976 (7th)
