= Britton Payne =

American curler

- Curler ♂
- Born: September 19, 1940; Duluth, Minnesota, U.S.
- Died: June 24, 2020 (aged 79); Duluth, Minnesota, U.S.

Team
- Curling club: Duluth CC, Duluth, Minnesota

Curling career
- Member Association: United States
- World Championship: 1 (1964)
Medal record
Curling
World Championships
Bronze medal – third place	1964 Calgary
United States Men's Championship
Gold medal – first place	1964 Utica

Britton "Britt" Payne (September 19, 1940 - June 24, 2020) is an American curler.

He is a 1964 World Men's bronze medallist and a 1964 United States men's champion.

Payne is the son of his 1964 teammate, Bert. At the time of the 1964 Scotch Cup he worked in industrial relations.

== Teams ==
Season	Skip	Third	Second	Lead	Events
1963–64	Bob Magie Jr.	Bert Payne	Russell Barber	Britt Payne	USMCC 1964 (gold); WCC 1964 (bronze)
1966–67	Bob Magie Jr.	Britt Payne	Mike O’Leary	Russell Barber	USMCC 1967 (???th)
1973–74	Hugh Polski	Britt Payne	Byron Rowell	Bill Ketola	USMCC 1974 (???th)
