= André Tronc =

French curler (1929–2025)

- Curler
- Born: 27 May 1929; Loriol-du-Comtat, France
- Died: 6 August 2025 (aged 96); Mégève, France

Team
- Curling club: Mont d'Arbois CC, Megève, Belfort CC

Curling career
- Member Association: France
- World Championship: 6 (1971, 1972, 1973, 1975, 1976, 1982)
- European Championship: 2 (1977, 1981)
Medal record
Curling
World Championships
Bronze medal – third place	1973 Regina
French Men's Championship
Gold medal – first place	1975
Gold medal – first place	1976

André Yves Tronc (27 May 1929 – 6 August 2025) was a French curler.

Tronc was a 1973 World Men's bronze medallist and a two-time French men's champion. He died in Mégève on 6 August 2025, at the age of 96.

== Teams ==
Season	Skip	Third	Second	Lead	Alternate	Coach	Events
1970–71	Pierre Boan	André Mabboux	André Tronc	Richard Duvillard	Gerard Pasquier		WCC 1971 (6th)
1971–72	Pierre Boan	André Mabboux	André Tronc	Gerard Pasquier			WCC 1972 (7th)
1972–73	Pierre Boan	André Mabboux	André Tronc	Gerard Pasquier			WCC 1973 (bronze)
1974–75	André Tronc	Pierre Duclos	Henri Woehrling	Honore Brangi			WCC 1975 (6th)
1975–76	André Tronc	Gerard Pasquier	Richard Duvillard	Henri Woehrling			WCC 1976 (7th)
1977–78	André Tronc	Jean-Louis Sibuet	Gaby Ronchis	Jean-Francois Orset			ECC 1977 (6th)
1981–82	André Tronc	Maurice Mercier	Yves Tronc	Jean-Francois Orset			ECC 1981 (5th)
1981–82	André Tronc (fourth)	Roger Jacobs	Bob Lehn	Gérard Natter (skip)		Pierre Catella	WCC 1982 (10th)
