= Cesare Canepa =

Swiss curler

- Curler ♂

Team
- Curling club: CC Zug, Zug

Curling career
- Member Association: Switzerland
- World Championship: 2 (1971, 1973)
Medal record
Curling
Swiss Men's Championship
| Gold medal – first place | 1971 Genève |
| Gold medal – first place | 1973 Bern |

Cesare Canepa is a former Swiss curler.

At the national level, he is a two-time Swiss men's champion curler. He competed for Switzerland in two World championships.

== Teams ==
| Season | Skip | Third | Second | Lead | Events |
|---|---|---|---|---|---|
| 1970—71 | Cesare Canepa | Werner Oswald | Jakob Kluser | Hans-Ruedi Werren | SMCC 1971 (gold); WCC 1971 (4th) |
| 1972—73 | Werner Oswald | Cesare Canepa | Rolph Oswald | Hans-Ruedi Werren | SMCC 1973 (gold); WCC 1973 (5th) |
