= Helmer Strømbo =

Norwegian male curler (1948–2022)

- Curler ♂

Team
- Curling club: Bærum CC, Oslo

Curling career
- Member Association: Norway
- World Championship: 2 (1973, 1975)
- European Championship: 1 (1975)
- Other appearances: World Senior Championships: 1 (2003)
Medal record
Curling
European Championships
Gold medal – first place	1975 Megève
Norwegian Men's Championship
Gold medal – first place	1973
Gold medal – first place	1975

Helmer Strømbo (19 June 1948 – 28 March 2022) was a Norwegian curler.

He was a champion of the first-ever European Curling Championships, played in 1975 and a two-time Norwegian men's curling champion.

== Teams ==
Season	Skip	Third	Second	Lead	Alternate	Events
1972–73	Helmer Strømbo	Per Dammen	Geir Søiland	Øyvinn Fløstrand		WCC 1973 (7th)
1974–75	Helmer Strømbo	Knut Bjaanaes	Jan Kolstad	Øyvinn Fløstrand		WCC 1975 (8th)
1975–76	Knut Bjaanaes	Sven Kroken	Helmer Strømbo	Kjell Ulrichsen		ECC 1975 (gold)
2002–03	Tormod Andreassen	Sverre Sandbakken	Jan Kolstad	Olaf Carlem	Helmer Strømbo	WSCC 2003 (5th)
