= 1971 Air Canada Silver Broom =

- Host city: Megève, France
- Arena: Palais de Sports
- Dates: March 16–21
- Winner: Canada
- Curling club: Granite CC, Winnipeg, Manitoba
- Skip: Don Duguid
- Third: Rod Hunter
- Second: Jim Pettapiece
- Lead: Bryan Wood
- Finalist: Scotland (James Sanderson)

The 1971 Air Canada Silver Broom, the men's world curling championship, was held from March 16 to 21 at the Palais de Sports in Megève, France.

== Teams ==
Canada	France	Germany	Norway
Granite CC, Winnipeg, Manitoba Skip: Don Duguid; Third: Rod Hunter; Second: Jim Pettapiece; Lead: Bryan Wood	Mont d'Arbois CC, Megève Skip: Pierre Boan; Third: André Mabboux; Second: André Tronc; Lead: Richard Duvillard; Alternate: Gerard Pasquier	EC Oberstdorf, Oberstdorf Skip: Manfred Räderer; Third: Peter Jacoby; Second: Peder Ledosquet; Lead: Hansjörg Jacoby	Stabekk CC, Oslo Skip: Knut Bjaanaes; Third: Sven Kroken; Second: Per Dammen; Lead: Kjell Ulrichsen
Scotland	Sweden	Switzerland	United States
Oxenfoord CC, Edinburgh Skip: James Sanderson; Third: Willie Sanderson; Second: Iain Baxter; Lead: Colin Baxter	IF Göta, Karlstad Fourth: Roy Berglöf; Skip: Kjell Grengmark*; Second: Erik Berglöf; Lead: Lars-Erik Håkansson	Zug CC, Zug Skip: Cesare Canepa; Third: Werner Oswald; Second: Jakob Kluser; Lead: Hans-Ruedi Werren	Edmore CC, Edmore, North Dakota Skip: Dale Dalziel; Third: Dennis Melland; Second: Clark Sampson; Lead: Rodney Melland

*Throws third rocks.

== Standings ==
Key
Teams to playoffs
Teams to tiebreaker

Country	Skip	W	L
Canada	Don Duguid	7	0
Scotland	James Sanderson	5	2
United States	Dale Dalziel	4	3
Sweden	Kjell Grengmark	3	4
Switzerland	Cesare Canepa	3	4
France	Pierre Boan	2	5
Germany	Manfred Räderer	2	5
Norway	Knut Bjaanaes	2	5

== Results ==
=== Draw 1 ===
Team	Final
Canada (Duguid)	9
Switzerland (Canepa)	5

Team	Final
Scotland (Sanderson)	7
Germany (Räderer)	6

Team	Final
Sweden (Grengmark)	13
France (Boan)	3

Team	Final
Norway (Bjaanaes)	6
United States (Dalziel)	5

=== Draw 2 ===
Team	Final
Scotland (Sanderson)	11
Sweden (Grengmark)	3

Team	Final
Canada (Duguid)	9
United States (Dalziel)	5

Team	Final
Switzerland (Canepa)	9
Norway (Bjaanaes)	6

Team	Final
France (Boan)	11
Germany (Räderer)	9

=== Draw 3 ===
Team	Final
United States (Dalziel)	12
Switzerland (Canepa)	4

Team	Final
Germany (Räderer)	7
Sweden (Grengmark)	3

Team	Final
France (Boan)	9
Scotland (Sanderson)	7

Team	Final
Canada (Duguid)	7
Norway (Bjaanaes)	6

=== Draw 4 ===
Team	Final
Scotland (Sanderson)	8
Norway (Bjaanaes)	4

Team	Final
Canada (Duguid)	9
France (Boan)	5

Team	Final
United States (Dalziel)	14
Germany (Räderer)	4

Team	Final
Sweden (Grengmark)	6
Switzerland (Canepa)	5

=== Draw 5 ===
Team	Final
Canada (Duguid)	10
Sweden (Grengmark)	6

Team	Final
Norway (Bjaanaes)	4
France (Boan)	3

Team	Final
Switzerland (Canepa)	9
Germany (Räderer)	3

Team	Final
Scotland (Sanderson)	6
United States (Dalziel)	4

=== Draw 6 ===
Team	Final
United States (Dalziel)	12
France (Boan)	4

Team	Final
Scotland (Sanderson)	7
Switzerland (Canepa)	6

Team	Final
Sweden (Grengmark)	9
Norway (Bjaanaes)	6

Team	Final
Canada (Duguid)	8
Germany (Räderer)	4

=== Draw 7 ===
Team	Final
Germany (Räderer)	5
Norway (Bjaanaes)	4

Team	Final
United States (Dalziel)	3
Sweden (Grengmark)	2

Team	Final
Canada (Duguid)	10
Scotland (Sanderson)	6

Team	Final
Switzerland (Canepa)	6
France (Boan)	5

== Tiebreaker ==
Sheet C	1	2	3	4	5	6	7	8	9	10	11	12	Final
Sweden (Grengmark)	0	0	0	0	1	0	0	0	3	1	0	0	5
Switzerland (Canepa)	1	0	0	1	0	1	2	1	0	0	2	1	9

== Playoffs ==
Semi-final
1	Canada	9
4	Switzerland	5
2	Scotland	7
3	United States	6

Final
1	Canada	9
2	Scotland	5

=== Semifinals ===
Sheet A	1	2	3	4	5	6	7	8	9	10	11	12	Final
Canada (Duguid)	0	0	2	2	1	0	1	0	0	2	1	0	9
Switzerland (Canepa)	1	0	0	0	0	1	0	1	1	0	0	1	5

Sheet C	1	2	3	4	5	6	7	8	9	10	11	12	Final
Scotland (Sanderson)	2	0	1	0	0	0	2	0	1	0	0	1	7
United States (Dalziel)	0	2	0	2	1	0	0	1	0	0	0	0	6

=== Final ===
Sheet B	1	2	3	4	5	6	7	8	9	10	11	12	Final
Canada (Duguid)	1	0	0	0	4	0	2	0	2	0	0	0	9
Scotland (Sanderson)	0	0	0	1	0	2	0	1	0	1	0	0	5

1971 Air Canada Silver Broom
(Canada)
Canada
11th title
