= Willie Sanderson =

Scottish male curler

- Curler ♂

Team
- Curling club: Oxenfoord CC, Edinburgh

Curling career
- Member Association: Scotland
- World Championship: 2 (1971, 1978)
- European Championship: 1 (1978)
Medal record
Curling
World Championship
Silver medal – second place	1971 Megève
Scottish Men's Championship
Gold medal – first place	1971
Gold medal – first place	1978

Willie Sanderson is a Scottish curler.

He is a 1971 World Men's silver medallist and a two-time Scottish men's champion (1971, 1978).

== Teams ==
Season	Skip	Third	Second	Lead	Events
1970–71	James Sanderson	Willie Sanderson	Iain Baxter	Colin Baxter	SMCC 1971 (gold); WMCC 1971 (silver)
1977–78	James Sanderson	Iain Baxter	Willie Sanderson	Colin Baxter	SMCC 1978 (gold); WMCC 1978 (5th)
1978–79	James Sanderson	Iain Baxter	Colin Baxter	Willie Sanderson	ECC 1978 (4th)
