= Robert Kirkland (curler) =

Scottish curler

- Curler ♂
- Other names: Bobby
- Born: Quarter, Lanarkshire

Team
- Curling club: Hamilton & Thornyhill CC

Curling career
- Member Association: Scotland
- World Championship: 3 (1964, 1972, 1974)
Medal record
Curling
World Championships
Silver medal – second place	1964 Calgary
Scottish Men's Championship
Gold medal – first place	1964 Edinburgh
Gold medal – first place	1972
Gold medal – first place	1974

Robert "Bobby" Kirkland (born c. 1936) is a Scottish curler. He is a 1964 World men's championship silver medallist and three-time Scottish men's champion.

Kirkland and the entirety of his 1964 Scottish champion rink were farmers from Hamilton.

== Teams ==
Season	Skip	Third	Second	Lead	Events
1963–64	Alex F. Torrance	Alex A. Torrance	Robert Kirkland	Jimmy Waddell	SMCC 1964 (gold); WCC 1964 (silver)
1964–65	Alex F. Torrance	Alex A. Torrance	Robert Kirkland	Jimmy Waddell	EInt. 1965 (gold)
1966–67	Alex F. Torrance	Alex A. Torrance	Robert Kirkland	Jimmy Waddell	EInt. 1967 (gold)
1967–68	Alex F. Torrance	Alex A. Torrance	Robert Kirkland	Jimmy Waddell	EInt. 1968 (gold)
1971–72	Alex F. Torrance	Alex A. Torrance	Robert Kirkland	Jimmy Waddell	SMCC 1972 (gold); WCC 1972 (4th)
1973–74	Jimmy Waddell	Jim Steele	Robert Kirkland	Willie Frame	SMCC 1974 (gold); WCC 1974 (8th)
