= Kjell Christian Ulrichsen =

Norwegian businessperson (born 1944)

Kjell Ulrichsen
- Curler ♂
- Born: 18 November 1944 (age 81)

Team
- Curling club: Bærum CC, Oslo

Curling career
- Member Association: Norway
- World Championship: 2 (1971, 1972)
- European Championship: 1 (1975)
Medal record
Curling
European Championships
Gold medal – first place	1975 Megève
Norwegian Men's Championship
Gold medal – first place	1971
Gold medal – first place	1972
Gold medal – first place	1975

Kjell Christian Ulrichsen (born 18 November 1944) is a Norwegian businessperson and former curler.

Along with Erik Must, Ulrichsen established the stock broker Fondsfinans. The two later bought part of the publishing company Gyldendal Norsk Forlag. On 26 November 2008, he sold his shares to Must for NOK 350 per share, even though co-owner Trygve Hegnar, with whom they were in a conflict, had bid NOK 500. Through the company Stabæk Holding he owns Telenor Arena, the home ground of Stabæk Fotball, and was previously one of the club's main owners.

From the age of two until the age of eighteen, Ulrichsen lived at an orphanage. He is cousin of Queen Sonja. He has had a legal conflict with Sandefjord Municipality regarding his property on Yxney at Østerøya regarding him trying to hinder the public their freedom to roam.

== Curling career ==
He is a champion of the first-ever European Curling Championships, played in 1975 and a three-time Norwegian men's curling champion.

== Teams ==
Season	Skip	Third	Second	Lead	Events
1970–71	Knut Bjaanaes	Sven Kroken	Per Dammen	Kjell Ulrichsen	WCC 1971 (6th)
1971–72	Knut Bjaanaes	Sven Kroken	Per Dammen	Kjell Ulrichsen	WCC 1972 (6th)
1975–76	Knut Bjaanaes	Sven Kroken	Helmer Strømbo	Kjell Ulrichsen	ECC 1975 (gold)
