= André Mabboux =

French curler (1923–2011)

- Curler
- Born: André Jean Mabboux; 6 November 1923; Megève, France
- Died: 17 November 2011 (aged 88); Sallanches, France

Team
- Curling club: Mont d'Arbois CC, Megève

Curling career
- Member Association: France
- World Championship: 4 (1969, 1971, 1972, 1973)
- European Championship: 1 (1976)
Medal record
Curling
World Championships
Bronze medal – third place	1973 Regina

André Jean Mabboux (6 November 1923 – 17 November 2011) was a French curler.

He is a 1973 World Men's bronze medallist.

== Teams ==
Season	Skip	Third	Second	Lead	Alternate	Events
1968–69	Pierre Boan	André Mabboux	Yves Vallet	Richard Duvillard		WCC 1969 (7th)
1970–71	Pierre Boan	André Mabboux	André Tronc	Richard Duvillard	Gerard Pasquier	WCC 1971 (6th)
1971–72	Pierre Boan	André Mabboux	André Tronc	Gerard Pasquier		WCC 1972 (7th)
1972–73	Pierre Boan	André Mabboux	André Tronc	Gerard Pasquier		WCC 1973 (bronze)
1976–77	Pierre Boan	André Mabboux	Pierre Duclos	Georges Panisset		ECC 1976 (5th)
