= 1972 Air Canada Silver Broom =

- Host city: Garmisch-Partenkirchen, West Germany
- Arena: Olympic Eisstadion
- Dates: March 19–21, 1972
- Winner: Canada
- Curling club: Fort Rouge CC, Winnipeg, Manitoba
- Skip: Orest Meleschuk
- Third: Dave Romano
- Second: John Hanesiak
- Lead: Pat Hailley
- Finalist: United States

The 1972 Air Canada Silver Broom was held at the Olympic Eisstadion in Garmisch-Partenkirchen, West Germany from March 19–21, 1972. The 1972 Air Canada Silver Broom was the site of the infamous incident that led to the Curse of LaBonte.

== Teams ==
Canada	United States	Germany	Scotland
Fort Rouge CC, Winnipeg, Manitoba Skip: Orest Meleschuk; Third: Dave Romano; Second: John Hanesiak; Lead: Pat Hailley	Grafton CC, North Dakota Skip: Robert LaBonte; Third: Frank Aasand; Second: John Aasand; Lead: Ray Morgan	EC Oberstdorf Skip: Manfred Räderer; Third: Peter Jacoby; Second: Peder Ledosquet; Lead: Hansjörg Jacoby	Hamilton & Thornyhill CC, Hamilton Skip: Alex F. Torrance; Third: Alex A. Torrance; Second: Robert Kirkland; Lead: Jimmy Waddell
Switzerland	Norway	France	Sweden
Dübendorf CC Fourth: Peter Attinger Jr. Third: Bernhard Attinger; Skip: Peter Attinger Sr.* Lead: Ernst Bosshard	Stabekk CC, Oslo Skip: Knut Bjaanaes; Third: Sven Kroken; Second: Per Dammen; Lead: Kjell Ulrichsen	Mont d' Arbois CC, Megève Skip: Pierre Boan; Third: André Mabboux; Second: André Tronc; Lead: Gerard Pasquier	Djursholms CK, Stockholm Skip: Kjell Oscarius; Third: Tom Schaeffer; Second: Bengt Oscarius; Lead: Claes-Göran "Boa" Carlman

*Throws second rocks.

== Standings ==
Key
Teams to playoffs
Teams to tiebreaker

Country	Skip	W	L
Canada	Orest Meleschuk	7	0
Germany	Manfred Räderer	4	3
United States	Robert LaBonte	4	3
Switzerland	Peter Attinger Jr.	4	3
Scotland	Alex F. Torrance	4	3
Norway	Knut Bjaanaes	3	4
France	Pierre Boan	2	5
Sweden	Kjell Oscarius	0	7

== Round-robin results ==
=== Draw 1 ===
Team	Final
Canada (Meleschuk)	11
Switzerland (Attinger)	6

Team	Final
Scotland (Torrance)	7
Germany (Räderer)	5

Team	Final
France (Boan)	7
Sweden (Oscarius)	6

Team	Final
United States (LaBonte)	7
Norway (Bjaanaes)	5

=== Draw 2 ===
Team	Final
Scotland (Torrance)	5
Sweden (Oscarius)	3

Team	Final
Canada (Meleschuk)	11
United States (LaBonte)	1

Team	Final
Switzerland (Attinger)	10
Norway (Bjaanaes)	4

Team	Final
Germany (Räderer)	7
France (Boan)	6

=== Draw 3 ===
Team	Final
United States (LaBonte)	9
Switzerland (Attinger)	3

Team	Final
Germany (Räderer)	9
Sweden (Oscarius)	3

Team	Final
Scotland (Torrance)	6
France (Boan)	5

Team	Final
Canada (Meleschuk)	8
Norway (Bjaanaes)	7

=== Draw 4 ===
Team	Final
Scotland (Torrance)	6
Norway (Bjaanaes)	4

Team	Final
Canada (Meleschuk)	11
France (Boan)	5

Team	Final
Germany (Räderer)	9
United States (LaBonte)	6

Team	Final
Switzerland (Attinger)	6
Sweden (Oscarius)	4

=== Draw 5 ===
Team	Final
France (Boan)	10
United States (LaBonte)	8

Team	Final
Switzerland (Attinger)	8
Scotland (Torrance)	7

Team	Final
Norway (Bjaanaes)	4
Sweden (Oscarius)	3

Team	Final
Canada (Meleschuk)	9
Germany (Räderer)	4

=== Draw 6 ===
Team	Final
Canada (Meleschuk)	8
Sweden (Oscarius)	6

Team	Final
Norway (Bjaanaes)	8
France (Boan)	3

Team	Final
Germany (Räderer)	9
Switzerland (Attinger)	5

Team	Final
Scotland (Torrance)	4
United States (LaBonte)	5

=== Draw 7 ===
Team	Final
Norway (Bjaanaes)	7
Germany (Räderer)	5

Team	Final
United States (LaBonte)	10
Sweden (Oscarius)	6

Team	Final
Canada (Meleschuk)	10
Scotland (Torrance)	7

Team	Final
Switzerland (Attinger)	6
France (Boan)	5

== Tiebreaker ==
Team	Final
Scotland (Torrance)	9
Switzerland (Attinger)	6

== Playoffs ==
Semi-final
1	Canada	8
2	Scotland	3
2	Germany	4
2	United States	9

Final
1	Canada	10
2	United States	9

=== Semifinals ===
Sheet C	1	2	3	4	5	6	7	8	9	10	Final
Germany (Räderer)	1	0	0	1	0	0	2	0	0	0	4
United States (LaBonte)	0	3	1	0	1	2	0	1	1	0	9

Sheet A	1	2	3	4	5	6	7	8	9	10	Final
Canada (Meleschuk)	0	0	0	1	3	2	0	0	2	0	8
Scotland (Torrance)	0	0	1	0	0	0	1	1	0	0	3

=== Final ===
Sheet B	1	2	3	4	5	6	7	8	9	10	11	Final
United States (LaBonte)	2	0	2	1	0	2	0	0	2	0	0	9
Canada (Meleschuk)	0	1	0	0	2	0	2	2	0	2	1	10

1972 Air Canada Silver Broom
(Canada)
Canada
12th title

== The Curse of LaBonte ==
The 1972 Air Canada Silver Broom saw the incident which led to the Curse of LaBonte. In the finals, Canada under Meleschuk was playing the Americans under LaBonte, and Canada was down by two points in the final end. Meleschuck had the hammer and tried to hit out an American stone on the button so that Canada could take two and tie the game. The rock succeeded in knocking out the American stone, but rolled so that it came to be very close to another American rock biting the 8-foot. US third Frank Aasand saw that the American rock was still second shot and jumped in the air to celebrate. LaBonte also followed suit, but slipped and kicked the Canadian stone while Canadian third Dave Romano was still investigating the shot. It was decided that Canada got two points in the 10th end, forcing an extra end in which Canada stole a point and won.

It was said that LaBonte placed a curse on Canada, which did not win a world championship until 1980.
