= 1964 Scotch Cup =

- Host city: Calgary, Alberta, Canada
- Arena: Stampede Corral
- Dates: March 16–19, 1964
- Attendance: 20,242
- Winner: Canada
- Curling club: Vancouver CC; Vancouver, British Columbia
- Skip: Lyall Dagg
- Third: Leo Hebert
- Second: Fred Britton
- Lead: Barry Naimark
- Finalist: Scotland

The 1964 Scotch Cup was the sixth edition of the Scotch Cup with the tournament being held outside of Scotland for the first time with Calgary, Canada hosting the tournament at the Stampede Corral from March 16–19, 1964.

The tournament was expanded to six teams with Norway and Switzerland debuting in the tournament. This meant a playoff system had to be introduced with the top four teams competing in a knockout format. The final saw Canada claim their sixth title defeating Scotland 12-10 in an extra 13th end. In the extra, with the game tied 10–10, with Canada having hammer, Scottish skip Alex F. Torrance was heavy with his final draw against two Canadian rocks, and Canada skip Lyall Dagg didn't have to throw his last rock.

The attendance for the week was 20,242, a record for the time, and included an attendance of 4,370 for the final.

== Teams ==
Canada	Norway	Scotland
Vancouver CC, Vancouver, British Columbia Skip: Lyall Dagg; Third: Leo Hebert; Second: Fred Britton; Lead: Barry Naimark	Oppdal CC, Oppdal Fourth: Eivind Kjaervik; Skip: Per Holaker*; Second: Kristian Alstad; Lead: Erling Ween	Hamilton & Thornyhill CC, Hamilton Skip: Alex F. Torrance; Third: Alex A. Torrance; Second: Robert Kirkland; Lead: Jimmy Waddell
Sweden	Switzerland	United States
Åredalens CK, Åre Fourth: John-Allan Månsson; Skip: Curt Jonsson*; Second: Gustav Larsson; Lead: Magnus Berge	Rigi-Kaltbad CC, Küssnacht am Rigi Skip: Gerold Keller; Third: Franz Zimmerman; Second: Alois Zimmerman; Lead: Franz Gernet	Duluth CC, Duluth, Minnesota Skip: Bob Magie Jr. Third: Bert Payne; Second: Russell Barber; Lead: Britton Payne

*Throws third rocks.

== Standings ==
Country	Skip	W	L
Canada	Lyall Dagg	5	0
Scotland	Alex F. Torrance	4	1
United States	Bob Magie Jr.	3	2
Sweden	Curt Jonsson	2	3
Norway	Per Holaker	1	4
Switzerland	Gerold Keller	0	5

== Results ==
=== Draw 1 ===
March 16, 8:00 p.m.

Sheet 1	1	2	3	4	5	6	7	8	9	10	11	12	Final
Scotland (Torrance)	4	1	1	2	0	2	2	0	1	1	0	3	17
Norway (Holaker)	0	0	0	0	2	0	0	1	0	0	1	0	4

Sheet 2	1	2	3	4	5	6	7	8	9	10	11	12	Final
Sweden (Jonsson)	1	3	1	2	0	2	3	0	1	1	0	2	16
Switzerland (Keller)	0	0	0	0	2	0	0	1	0	0	1	0	4

Sheet 3	1	2	3	4	5	6	7	8	9	10	11	12	Final
Canada (Dagg)	2	2	0	0	1	0	2	0	2	1	0	0	10
United States (Magie)	0	0	1	1	0	2	0	1	0	0	1	1	7

=== Draw 2 ===
March 17, 2:30 p.m.

Sheet 1	1	2	3	4	5	6	7	8	9	10	11	12	Final
United States (Magie)	1	0	0	1	1	0	3	0	2	1	0	0	9
Sweden (Jonsson)	0	0	1	0	0	1	0	3	0	0	1	0	6

Sheet 2	1	2	3	4	5	6	7	8	9	10	11	12	Final
Canada (Dagg)	1	1	0	3	2	3	3	1	1	2	0	2	19
Norway (Holaker)	0	0	1	0	0	0	0	0	0	0	1	0	2

Sheet 3	1	2	3	4	5	6	7	8	9	10	11	12	Final
Scotland (Torrance)	3	1	3	0	2	3	2	5	1	1	1	0	22
Switzerland (Keller)	0	0	0	1	0	0	0	0	0	0	0	1	2

=== Draw 3 ===
March 17, 8:00 p.m.

Sheet 2	1	2	3	4	5	6	7	8	9	10	11	12	Final
Scotland (Torrance)	0	0	1	0	3	0	1	0	0	2	2	2	11
United States (Magie)	1	1	0	0	0	2	0	1	0	0	0	0	5

Sheet 3	1	2	3	4	5	6	7	8	9	10	11	12	Final
Norway (Holaker)	0	2	0	4	0	2	0	1	1	1	2	0	13
Switzerland (Keller)	2	0	1	0	3	0	2	0	0	0	0	2	10

Sheet 1	1	2	3	4	5	6	7	8	9	10	11	12	Final
Canada (Dagg)	2	1	1	0	2	0	2	1	0	2	0	2	13
Sweden (Jonsson)	0	0	0	2	0	2	0	0	1	0	1	0	6

=== Draw 4 ===
March 18, 2:30 p.m.

Sheet 1	1	2	3	4	5	6	7	8	9	10	11	12	Final
Scotland (Torrance)	0	1	2	0	1	0	1	0	4	2	2	0	13
Sweden (Jonsson)	1	0	0	1	0	1	0	1	0	0	0	1	5

Sheet 2	1	2	3	4	5	6	7	8	9	10	11	12	Final
Canada (Dagg)	2	2	2	0	0	0	3	2	0	2	1	0	14
Switzerland (Keller)	0	0	0	1	0	1	0	0	1	0	0	1	4

Sheet 3	1	2	3	4	5	6	7	8	9	10	11	12	Final
United States (Magie)	1	1	0	1	2	1	3	3	1	1	2	0	16
Norway (Holaker)	0	0	1	0	0	0	0	0	0	0	0	3	4

=== Draw 5 ===
March 18, 8:00 p.m.

Sheet 1	1	2	3	4	5	6	7	8	9	10	11	12	Final
United States (Magie)	1	0	2	1	3	2	1	0	2	0	3	0	15
Switzerland (Keller)	0	1	0	0	0	0	0	1	0	1	0	1	4

Sheet 2	1	2	3	4	5	6	7	8	9	10	11	12	Final
Canada (Dagg)	1	0	2	1	1	0	2	0	1	0	1	0	9
Scotland (Torrance)	0	2	0	0	0	1	0	2	0	1	0	1	7

Sheet 3	1	2	3	4	5	6	7	8	9	10	11	12	Final
Sweden (Jonsson)	0	0	0	3	1	1	1	1	3	2	0	1	13
Norway (Holaker)	1	1	1	0	0	0	0	0	0	0	1	0	4

=== Playoffs ===
Semi-final
1	Canada	14
4	Sweden	9
2	Scotland	13
3	United States	8

Final
1	Canada	12
2	Scotland	10

==== Semifinals ====
March 19, 2:30 p.m.

Sheet 1	1	2	3	4	5	6	7	8	9	10	11	12	Final
Canada (Dagg)	1	0	2	0	5	0	1	0	2	0	3	0	14
Sweden (Jonsson)	0	2	0	2	0	1	0	1	0	1	0	2	9

Sheet 3	1	2	3	4	5	6	7	8	9	10	11	12	Final
Scotland (Torrance)	2	2	0	5	0	1	2	0	0	1	0	0	13
United States (Magie)	0	0	1	0	2	0	0	1	2	0	1	1	8

==== Final ====
March 19, 8:00 p.m.

Sheet 2	1	2	3	4	5	6	7	8	9	10	11	12	13	Final
Canada (Dagg)	0	2	0	1	0	3	0	1	1	0	2	0	2	12
Scotland (Torrance)	0	0	2	0	2	0	2	0	0	2	0	2	0	10

Player percentages
Scotland		Canada	
Jim Waddell	74.0%	Barry Naimark	87.0%
Bobby Kirkland	75.0%	Fred Britton	65.0%
Alex Torrance	80.0%	Leo Hebert	82.6%
Alex F. Torrance	70.1%	Lyall Dagg	80.0%
Total	74.7%	Total	78.6%

1964 Scotch Cup
Canada
6th title
