= Peder Ledosquet =

German curler

- Curler ♂

Team
- Curling club: EC Oberstdorf, Oberstdorf

Curling career
- Member Association: Germany
- World Championship: 2 (1971, 1972)
Medal record
Curling
World Championships
Bronze medal – third place	1972 Garmisch-Partenkirchen

Peder Ledosquet is a former German curler.

He is a 1972 World Men's bronze medallist.

== Teams ==
Season	Skip	Third	Second	Lead	Events
1970–71	Manfred Räderer	Peter Jacoby	Peder Ledosquet	Hansjörg Jacoby	WCC 1971 (6th)
1971–72	Manfred Räderer	Peter Jacoby	Peder Ledosquet	Hansjörg Jacoby	WCC 1972 (bronze)
