= 1975 Air Canada Silver Broom =

- Host city: Perth, Scotland
- Arena: Perth Ice Rink
- Dates: March 17–23, 1975
- Winner: Switzerland
- Curling club: Zürich Crystal CC
- Skip: Otto Danieli
- Third: Roland Schneider
- Second: Rolf Gautschi
- Lead: Ueli Mülli
- Finalist: United States

The 1975 Air Canada Silver Broom was held at the Perth Ice Rink in Perth, Scotland from March 17–23, 1975.

== Teams ==
Canada	Denmark	France	Germany	Italy
Fort William CC, Thunder Bay, Ontario Skip: Bill Tetley; Third: Rick Lang; Second: Bill Hodgson; Lead: Peter Hnatiw	Hvidovre CC, Hvidovre Skip: John Kjaerulff; Third: Leif Gottske; Second: Kenneth Poulsen; Lead: Peter Haase	Mont d' Arbois CC, Megève Skip: André Tronc; Third: Pierre Duclos; Second: Henri Woehrling; Lead: Honore Brangi	EC Bad Tölz, Bad Tölz Skip: Klaus Kanz; Third: Manfred Rösgen; Second: Manfred Schulze; Lead: Adalbert Mayer	Cortina CC, Cortina d' Ampezzo Skip: Giuseppe Dal Molin; Third: Leone Rezzadore; Second: Franco Caldara; Lead: Enea Pavani
Norway	Scotland	Sweden	Switzerland	United States
Baerum CC, Oslo Skip: Helmer Strømbo; Third: Jan Kolstad; Second: Knut Bjaanaes; Lead: Øyvinn Fløstrand	Hamilton & Thornyhill CC, Hamilton Skip: Alex F. Torrance; Third: Alex A. Torrance; Second: Tom McGregor; Lead: Willie Kerr	Härnösands CK, Härnösand Fourth: Ragnar Kamp; Third: Björn Rudström; Second: Christer Mårtensson; Skip: Axel Kamp	Zürich Crystal CC, Zürich Skip: Otto Danieli; Third: Roland Schneider; Second: Rolf Gautschi; Lead: Ueli Mülli	Granite CC, Seattle, Washington Skip: Ed Risling; Third: Charles Lundgren; Second: Gary Schnee; Lead: Dave Tellvik

== Round-robin standings ==
Country	Skip	W	L
Canada	Bill Tetley	7	2
Sweden	Axel Kamp	7	2
United States	Ed Risling	7	2
Switzerland	Otto Danieli	6	3
France	André Tronc	5	4
Scotland	Alex F. Torrance	5	4
Germany	Klaus Kanz	4	5
Norway	Helmer Strømbo	3	6
Denmark	John Kjaerulff	1	8
Italy	Giuseppe Dal Molin	0	9

== Round-robin results ==
=== Draw 1 ===
Team	Final
Norway (Strømbo)	4
Scotland (Torrance)	7

Team	Final
United States (Risling)	6
Germany (Kanz)	4

Team	Final
Denmark (Kjaerulff)	7
Sweden (Kamp)	10

Team	Final
Canada (Tetley)	3
France (Tronc)	8

Team	Final
Switzerland (Danieli)	5
Italy (Dal Molin)	3

=== Draw 2 ===
Team	Final
United States (Risling)	5
Canada (Tetley)	7

Team	Final
Norway (Strømbo)	5
Switzerland (Danieli)	7

Team	Final
France (Tronc)	4
Germany (Kanz)	7

Team	Final
Denmark (Kjaerulff)	10
Italy (Dal Molin)	9

Team	Final
Scotland (Torrance)	7
Sweden (Kamp)	5

=== Draw 3 ===
Team	Final
Denmark (Kjaerulff)	6
France (Tronc)	13

Team	Final
Canada (Tetley)	7
Scotland (Torrance)	5

Team	Final
Norway (Strømbo)	10
Italy (Dal Molin)	9

Team	Final
United States (Risling)	5
Sweden (Kamp)	10

Team	Final
Switzerland (Danieli)	12
Germany (Kanz)	5

=== Draw 4 ===
Team	Final
Switzerland (Danieli)	3
Scotland (Torrance)	5

Team	Final
Norway (Strømbo)	7
France (Tronc)	5

Team	Final
Canada (Tetley)	9
Sweden (Kamp)	7

Team	Final
Germany (Kanz)	8
Denmark (Kjaerulff)	5

Team	Final
United States (Risling)	8
Italy (Dal Molin)	7

=== Draw 5 ===
Team	Final
Norway (Strømbo)	9
Sweden (Kamp)	11

Team	Final
Denmark (Kjaerulff)	2
Switzerland (Danieli)	11

Team	Final
France (Tronc)	5
Italy (Dal Molin)	3

Team	Final
United States (Risling)	6
Scotland (Torrance)	5

Team	Final
Canada (Tetley)	4
Germany (Kanz)	2

=== Draw 6 ===
Team	Final
Canada (Tetley)	6
Switzerland (Danieli)	8

Team	Final
Italy (Dal Molin)	1
Sweden (Kamp)	8

Team	Final
Denmark (Kjaerulff)	7
Scotland (Torrance)	11

Team	Final
Norway (Strømbo)	6
Germany (Kanz)	2

Team	Final
United States (Risling)	11
France (Tronc)	3

=== Draw 7 ===
Team	Final
France (Tronc)	7
Sweden (Kamp)	9

Team	Final
Scotland (Torrance)	3
Germany (Kanz)	4

Team	Final
United States (Risling)	8
Switzerland (Danieli)	5

Team	Final
Canada (Tetley)	8
Italy (Dal Molin)	2

Team	Final
Denmark (Kjaerulff)	7
Norway (Strømbo)	12

=== Draw 8 ===
Team	Final
Italy (Dal Molin)	3
Germany (Kanz)	5

Team	Final
France (Tronc)	9
Scotland (Torrance)	4

Team	Final
United States (Risling)	9
Norway (Strømbo)	4

Team	Final
Switzerland (Danieli)	3
Sweden (Kamp)	4

Team	Final
Denmark (Kjaerulff)	5
Canada (Tetley)	10

=== Draw 9 ===
Team	Final
United States (Risling)	11
Denmark (Kjaerulff)	6

Team	Final
Norway (Strømbo)	6
Canada (Tetley)	9

Team	Final
Switzerland (Danieli)	9
France (Tronc)	3

Team	Final
Scotland (Torrance)	6
Italy (Dal Molin)	3

Team	Final
Sweden (Kamp)	8
Germany (Kanz)	2

== Playoffs ==
Semifinals
1	Canada	5
4	Switzerland	6
3	United States	6
2	Sweden	4

Final
4	Switzerland	7
3	United States	3

=== Semifinals ===
Sheet B	1	2	3	4	5	6	7	8	9	10	Final
Sweden (Kamp)	1	0	2	0	1	0	0	0	0	0	4
United States (Risling)	0	2	0	1	0	0	0	1	1	1	6

Sheet D	1	2	3	4	5	6	7	8	9	10	Final
Canada (Tetley)	0	0	1	2	0	0	1	0	1	0	5
Switzerland (Danieli)	1	0	0	0	0	2	0	2	0	1	6

=== Final ===
Sheet C	1	2	3	4	5	6	7	8	9	10	Final
Switzerland (Danieli)	1	1	0	1	1	0	0	1	2	X	7
United States (Risling)	0	0	1	0	0	1	1	0	0	X	3

1975 Air Canada Silver Broom
(Switzerland)
Switzerland
1st title
