= Robert LaBonte =

American curler

- Curler ♂

Team
- Curling club: Grafton CC, Grafton, ND

Curling career
- Member Association: United States
- World Championship: 1 (1972)
Medal record
Curling
World Championships
Silver medal – second place	1972 Garmisch-Partenkirchen
United States Men's Championship
Gold medal – first place	1972 Wilmette

Robert "Bob" LaBonte (born c. 1950) is an American curler, a 1972 World Men's silver medallist and a 1972 United States men's curling champion. He currently lives in Minot, North Dakota and is employed as a stock broker.

He is best known for the "Curse of LaBonte" - one of the most famous curses in curling history. It was caused by an incident at the finals against Canada at the 1972 world men's curling championship, the 1972 Air Canada Silver Broom in Garmisch-Partenkirchen, Germany. After the last shot of the 10th end came to rest, it appeared as though they had won, and LaBonte leaped in the air to celebrate, but upon his descent he burned (touched) a Canadian stone. The stone was replaced and was found to be closer, giving Canada the point and forcing the game to an extra end, where Canada scored again, winning the match. Canada did not win another World Championship until 1980, and were said to have been "cursed".

== Personal life ==
LaBonte attended the University of North Dakota.

== Teams ==
Season	Skip	Third	Second	Lead	Events
1971–72	Robert LaBonte	Frank Aasand	John Aasand	Ray Morgan	USMCC 1972 (gold); WCC 1972 (silver)
