= Charles Lundgren =

American curler

- Curler ♂

Team
- Curling club: Granite CC, Seattle, Washington

Curling career
- Member Association: United States
- World Championship: 1 (1975)
Medal record
Curling
World Championships
Silver medal – second place	1975 Perth
United States Men's Championship
Gold medal – first place	1975 Detroit

Charles Lundgren is an American curler.

He is a 1975 World Men's silver medallist and a 1975 United States men's curling champion.

== Teams ==
Season	Skip	Third	Second	Lead	Events
1974–75	Ed Risling	Charles Lundgren	Gary Schnee	Dave Tellvik	1975 USMCC (gold); 1975 WMCC (silver)
