= Dale Dalziel =

American male curler

- Curler ♂
- Born: c. 1938; Winnipeg, Manitoba, Canada

Team
- Curling club: Victoria CC, Victoria, BC; Edmore CC, Grafton, ND

Curling career
- Member Association: British Columbia (North Dakota) Dakota Territory
- World Championship: 1 (1971)
Medal record
Curling
World Championships
Bronze medal – third place	1971 Megève
United States Men's Championship
Gold medal – first place	1971 Duluth

Dale A. Dalziel is a former Canadian-American curler, 1971 World Men's bronze medallist and a 1971 United States men's curling champion.

While residing in Canada, Dalziel qualified for his lone Brier in 1958, playing lead for the Tony Gutoski rink. Dalziel was 19 years old at the time, having just graduated from high school the previous year. It was his first season playing in the BC Men's Curling Championship.

Dalziel moved from Victoria, British Columbia in 1959, settling in the United States. He won the United States Men's Curling Championship in 1971, after finishing the round robin with a 10–1 record. He led the U.S. to a bronze medal at the 1971 World Championship. At the time of the 1971 Worlds, he was a school principal.

== Teams ==
Season	Skip	Third	Second	Lead	Events
1957–58	Tony Gutoski	Bill Dunstan	Gary Leibel	Dale Dalziel	BCMCC 1958 (gold); Brier 1958 (4th)
1970–71	Dale Dalziel	Dennis Melland	Clark Sampson	Rodney Melland	USMCC 1971 (gold); WCC 1971 (bronze)
