= Pierre Duclos =

French curler

- Curler

Team
- Curling club: Megève CC, Megève, Mont d'Arbois CC, Megève

Curling career
- Member Association: France
- World Championship: 4 (1974, 1975, 1977, 1978)
- European Championship: 1 (1976)
Medal record
Curling
French Men's Championship
Gold medal – first place	1974

Pierre Duclos is a French curler.

At the national level, he is (as a skip) a one-time French men's champion curler (1974).

== Teams ==
Season	Skip	Third	Second	Lead	Events
1973–74	Pierre Duclos	Raymond Bouvet	Maurice Mercier	Aldo Merlin	WCC 1974 (5th)
1974–75	André Tronc	Pierre Duclos	Henri Woehrling	Honore Brangi	WCC 1975 (6th)
1976–77	Pierre Boan	André Mabboux	Pierre Duclos	Georges Panisset	ECC 1976 (5th)
1976–77	Pierre Boan	Pierre Duclos	Honore Brangi	Jean-Claude Gachet	WCC 1977 (9th)
1977–78	Pierre Boan	Pierre Duclos	Honore Brangi	Jean-Claude Gachet	WCC 1978 (7th)
