= Frank Aasand =

American curler (1949–2019)

- Curler ♂
- Born: July 27, 1949; Grafton, North Dakota, U.S.
- Died: January 15, 2016 (aged 66); Fargo, North Dakota, U.S.

Team
- Curling club: Grafton CC, Grafton, ND

Curling career
- Member Association: United States
- World Championship: 1 (1972)
Medal record
Curling
World Championships
Silver medal – second place	1972 Garmisch-Partenkirchen
United States Men's Championship
Gold medal – first place	1972 Wilmette

Frank Aasand (July 27, 1949 – January 15, 2016) was an American curler, a 1972 World Men's silver medallist and a 1972 United States men's curling champion.

That 1972 silver medallist team is best known for the "Curse of LaBonte" - one of the most famous curses in curling history. It was caused by an incident at the finals of the 1972 world men's curling championship, the 1972 Air Canada Silver Broom in Garmisch-Partenkirchen, Germany.

He also won the 1976 United States Mixed Curling Championship.

== Personal life ==
Aasand was the son of Ole Aasand and Frances Weed, and his brother John was his teammate. He graduated from Grafton High School and North Dakota State University with a degree in pharmacy and worked for Getz Drug. He was married to Victoria LaBonte and lived in Grafton and had three children. He later owned Frank's Pharmacy, and then worked for Grafton Drug. He moved to Fargo in 2011. He was a member of the St. John the Evangelist Catholic Church, the Elks Club, the Eagle's Club and was a past president of the Grafton Curling Club. In 2012, Aasand pleaded guilty to aggravated assault, and initially faced an attempted murder charge. He was accused of repeatedly hitting his wife on the head with a hammer. After spending time in jail, he agreed to move away from Grafton and was barred from contacting his wife.

== Teams ==
=== Men's ===
Season	Skip	Third	Second	Lead	Events
1971–72	Robert LaBonte	Frank Aasand	John Aasand	Ray Morgan	USMCC 1972 (gold); WCC 1972 (silver)

=== Mixed ===
Season	Skip	Third	Second	Lead	Events
1976	Frank Aasand	Paddy Hankey	Ray Morgan	Vicky Aasand	USMxCC 1976 (gold)
