= Erik Must =

Norwegian stock broker and investor (born 1943)

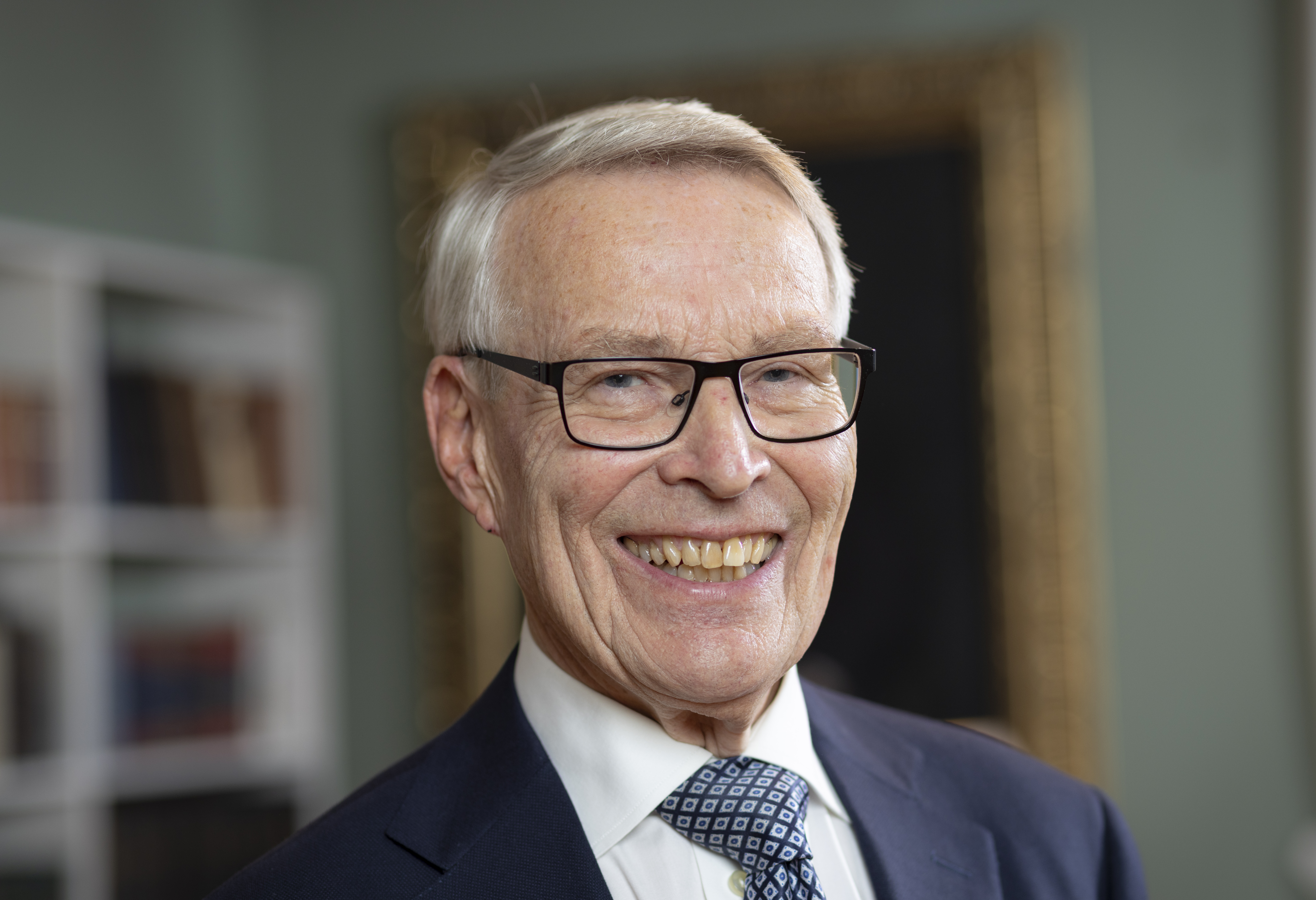
- Born: 26 January 1943 (age 82); Trondheim, Norway
- Occupation(s): Stock broker and investor

Erik Must (born 26 January 1943) is a Norwegian stock broker and investor. He was born in Trondheim, a son of banker Arne Bernhoft Must and Svanhild Synnøve Svendsen. He established the investment company Avanse Forvaltning along with Kjell Christian Ulrichsen, and later became owner of Fondsfinans. He is a significant investor in Norwegian media companies, controlling large parts of the publishing house Gyldendal Norsk Forlag, as well as the newspapers Dagens Næringsliv and Adresseavisen. He is also a significant owner of the energy company Arendals Fossekompani. As of 2024 Must is the largest private investor in the technology group Kongsberg Gruppen, where his assets reached an estimated worth of NOK 5 billion in 2024.

Forbes lists his net worth as of April 2022 at $1.1 billion USD.
