= Bob Magie Jr. =

American curler

- Curler ♂
- Born: May 9, 1914
- Died: March 27, 2000 (aged 85); Duluth, Minnesota, U.S.

Team
- Curling club: Duluth CC, Duluth, Minnesota

Curling career
- Member Association: United States
- World Championship: 1 (1964)
Medal record
Curling
World Championships
Bronze medal – third place	1964 Calgary
United States Men's Championship
Gold medal – first place	1964 Utica

Robert H. Magie Jr. (May 9, 1914 – March 27, 2000) was an American curler.

He was a 1964 World Men's bronze medallist and a 1964 United States men's champion.

Magie was an insurance agent and a scratch golfer.

== Teams ==
Season	Skip	Third	Second	Lead	Events
1944–45	Bert Payne	Bob Magie Jr.	Bob Magie Sr	Martin MacLean	
1946–47	Bob Magie Jr.	Bert Payne	Bob Magie Sr	W.A. Sanford	
1954–55	Bob Magie Jr.	Bert Payne	Russ Barber	Tyndal Palmer	
1963–64	Bob Magie Jr.	Bert Payne	Russell Barber	Britton Payne	USMCC 1964 (gold); WCC 1964 (bronze)
1966–67	Bob Magie Jr.	Britt Payne	Mike O’Leary	Russ Barber	USMCC 1967 (?th)
