= 1973 Air Canada Silver Broom =

- Host city: Regina, Saskatchewan, Canada
- Arena: Regina Exhibition Stadium
- Dates: March 19–24, 1973
- Winner: Sweden
- Curling club: Djursholms CK, Stockholm
- Skip: Kjell Oscarius
- Third: Bengt Oscarius
- Second: Tom Schaeffer
- Lead: Boa Carlman
- Finalist: Canada (Harvey Mazinke)

The 1973 Air Canada Silver Broom was held at the Regina Exhibition Stadium in Regina, Saskatchewan, Canada from March 19–24, 1973. The tournament was won by Sweden, with a team from Djursholms CK.

Sweden, skipped by Kjell Oscarius upset the hometown Canada rink, skipped by Harvey Mazinke in the final, 6–5 in an extra end in front 4,600 spectators. The Mazinke rink went into the final with a 35–1 record over the season, including an undefeated record at the Silver Boom up until that point. In the game, Mazinke got off to a good start by stealing singles in the first and second ends to take a 2–0 lead. Mazinke stole in the first by making a half-freeze to a Canadian stone. Oscarius was wide on his hit, and only took out one Canadian rock. In the second, Mazinke made a double takeout to sit one on his last, while Oscarius was light on his draw. Sweden replied by scoring singles in the next five straight ends to go up 5–2. In the third, Oscarius was under pressure on his last, thanks to misses by teammates Boa Carlman and Tom Schaeffer which resulted in Canada sitting three. Oscarius found his draw weight though, and put his rock in the four-foot to get his single. Ice conditions then began to deteriorate, and was blamed for Mazinke missing hits in the fourth and fifth ends, and hitting a guard in the sixth to give up steals. Canada recovered after the seventh, scoring singles in the next three ends, tying the game at 5 after ten ends. In the eighth, Canada third Bill Martin made a sensational hit and roll behind cover, which set up Canada for the possibility of scoring three. On his last, Mazinke needed a runback of a Canada stone to hit a Swedish rock to get three, but the raised rock hit a Canada rock instead. In the ninth, Oscarius started having his own troubles with the ice, and missed a takeout on his last to give up a point. The troubles continued in the tenth when he came up light on a draw on his last, which gave Canada the typing point. In the extra end, Sweden third Bengt Oscarius helped his team out by making a double takeout to sit one. On his last, Mazinke attempted to draw to the house against a Swedish counter, but it died near the hogline, giving Sweden the win. Ice conditions were blamed for the loss, with the Regina Leader-Post reporting that in the extra end, the ice "was at its worst since [the] opening afternoon".

== Teams ==
Canada	Denmark	France	West Germany	Italy
Regina CC, Regina Skip: Harvey Mazinke; Third: Bill Martin; Second: George Achtymichuk; Lead: Dan Klippenstein	København CC, Copenhagen Skip: Viggo Hunaeus; Third: Arne Pedersen; Second: Ib Asbjørn; Lead: Hans-Christian Olrik	Mont d'Arbois CC, Megève Skip: Pierre Boan; Third: André Mabboux; Second: André Tronc; Lead: Gerard Pasquier	EC Bad Tölz, Bad Tölz Skip: Klaus Kanz; Third: Heinz Kellner; Second: Manfred Rösgen; Lead: Manfred Schulze	Cortina CC, Cortina d'Ampezzo Skip: Renato Ghezze; Third: Paolo da Ros; Second: Lino Mariani Maier; Lead: Andrea Pavani
Norway	Scotland	Sweden	Switzerland	United States
Bærum CC, Bærum Skip: Helmer Strømbo; Third: Per Dammen; Second: Øyvinn Fløstrand; Lead: Geir Søiland	Hamilton & Thornyhill CC, Hamilton Skip: Alex F. Torrance; Third: Alex A. Torrance; Second: Tom McGregor; Lead: Willie Kerr	Djursholms CK, Djursholm Skip: Kjell Oscarius; Third: Bengt Oscarius; Second: Tom Schaeffer; Lead: Boa Carlman	CC Zug, Zug Skip: Werner Oswald; Third: Cesare Canepa; Second: Rolph Oswald; Lead: Hans-Ruedi Werren	Winchester CC, Winchester Skip: Charles Reeves; Third: Doug Carlson; Second: Henry Shean; Lead: Barry Blanchard

== Standings ==
Country	Skip	W	L	S%
Canada	Harvey Mazinke	9	0	73%
France	Pierre Boan	7	2	63%
Sweden	Kjell Oscarius	7	2	67%
Scotland	Alex F. Torrance	6	3	61%
Switzerland	Werner Oswald	5	4	62%
United States	Charles Reeves	5	4	65%
Norway	Helmer Strømbo	2	7	50%
West Germany	Klaus Kanz	2	7	55%
Italy	Renato Ghezze	1	8	50%
Denmark	Viggo Hunaeus	1	8	48%

== Results ==
=== Draw 1 ===
March 19

Team	1	2	3	4	5	6	7	8	9	10	Final
Sweden (Oscarius)	0	2	2	0	0	3	2	3	0	X	12
West Germany (Kanz)	1	0	0	2	1	0	0	0	2	X	6

Team	1	2	3	4	5	6	7	8	9	10	Final
Canada (Mazinke)	0	0	1	0	0	1	1	1	1	X	5
Norway (Strømbo)	0	0	0	0	1	0	0	0	0	X	1

Team	1	2	3	4	5	6	7	8	9	10	11	Final
United States (Reeves)	1	0	2	0	1	0	2	0	1	0	0	7
France (Boan)	0	1	0	1	0	2	0	1	0	2	1	8

Team	1	2	3	4	5	6	7	8	9	10	Final
Italy (Ghezze)	0	0	0	1	1	1	0	2	0	1	6
Switzerland (Oswald)	1	2	2	0	0	0	2	0	2	0	9

Team	1	2	3	4	5	6	7	8	9	10	Final
Scotland (Torrance)	2	0	2	2	0	1	2	2	2	1	14
Denmark (Hunaeus)	0	3	0	0	1	0	0	0	0	0	4

=== Draw 2 ===
March 19

Team	1	2	3	4	5	6	7	8	9	10	Final
Switzerland (Oswald)	2	3	0	2	0	2	5	0	2	X	16
Denmark (Hunaeus)	0	0	1	0	1	0	0	1	0	X	3

Team	1	2	3	4	5	6	7	8	9	10	Final
France (Boan)	0	0	4	1	1	2	1	0	1	0	10
Italy (Ghezze)	1	1	0	0	0	0	0	0	0	2	4

Team	1	2	3	4	5	6	7	8	9	10	Final
Sweden (Oscarius)	0	2	0	3	1	0	0	1	1	X	8
Norway (Strømbo)	0	0	1	0	0	1	1	0	0	X	3

Team	1	2	3	4	5	6	7	8	9	10	Final
United States (Reeves)	2	1	1	0	3	1	0	0	2	X	10
Scotland (Torrance)	0	0	0	1	0	0	1	2	0	X	4

Team	1	2	3	4	5	6	7	8	9	10	Final
West Germany (Kanz)	1	0	0	0	0	0	0	0	X	X	1
Canada (Mazinke)	0	0	4	1	2	2	3	3	X	X	15

=== Draw 3 ===
March 20

Team	1	2	3	4	5	6	7	8	9	10	Final
Norway (Strømbo)	3	2	0	1	0	2	0	0	2	1	11
Italy (Ghezze)	0	0	1	0	3	0	0	2	0	0	6

Team	1	2	3	4	5	6	7	8	9	10	Final
Sweden (Oscarius)	2	2	0	3	2	3	4	0	X	X	16
Denmark (Hunaeus)	0	0	1	0	0	0	0	1	X	X	2

Team	1	2	3	4	5	6	7	8	9	10	Final
West Germany (Kanz)	0	0	0	0	1	0	2	0	0	X	3
Scotland (Torrance)	0	0	0	1	0	2	0	2	0	X	5

Team	1	2	3	4	5	6	7	8	9	10	Final
Canada (Mazinke)	1	0	2	1	0	1	0	0	1	0	6
France (Boan)	0	1	0	0	1	0	0	1	0	2	5

Team	1	2	3	4	5	6	7	8	9	10	Final
United States (Reeves)	1	0	2	0	0	0	2	0	1	0	6
Switzerland (Oswald)	0	1	0	1	1	2	0	1	0	1	7

=== Draw 4 ===
March 20

Team	1	2	3	4	5	6	7	8	9	10	Final
West Germany (Kanz)	0	0	0	0	0	1	0	0	0	X	1
Switzerland (Oswald)	2	0	1	1	1	0	0	3	0	X	8

Team	1	2	3	4	5	6	7	8	9	10	Final
Italy (Ghezze)	0	0	1	3	0	1	0	0	1	0	6
Scotland (Torrance)	1	0	0	0	1	0	1	1	0	3	7

Team	1	2	3	4	5	6	7	8	9	10	Final
Sweden (Oscarius)	2	1	0	1	0	0	2	0	1	0	7
Canada (Mazinke)	0	0	2	0	1	1	0	3	0	1	8

Team	1	2	3	4	5	6	7	8	9	10	Final
France (Boan)	2	1	3	2	0	0	2	4	0	2	16
Denmark (Hunaeus)	0	0	0	0	1	1	0	0	1	0	3

Team	1	2	3	4	5	6	7	8	9	10	Final
Norway (Strømbo)	1	0	1	0	0	0	0	1	X	X	3
United States (Reeves)	0	0	0	3	2	2	3	0	X	X	10

=== Draw 5 ===
March 21

Team	1	2	3	4	5	6	7	8	9	10	Final
West Germany (Kanz)	0	1	0	0	0	0	1	0	0	X	2
France (Boan)	2	0	0	3	2	1	0	1	1	X	10

Team	1	2	3	4	5	6	7	8	9	10	Final
Canada (Mazinke)	2	0	3	1	3	1	1	0	X	X	12
Italy (Ghezze)	0	1	0	0	0	0	0	1	X	X	2

Team	1	2	3	4	5	6	7	8	9	10	Final
Sweden (Oscarius)	1	0	0	0	0	2	0	0	2	1	6
Scotland (Torrance)	0	0	1	1	0	0	2	0	0	0	4

Team	1	2	3	4	5	6	7	8	9	10	Final
Norway (Strømbo)	0	0	1	0	1	0	0	1	1	X	4
Switzerland (Oswald)	0	0	0	2	0	2	1	0	0	X	5

Team	1	2	3	4	5	6	7	8	9	10	Final
United States (Reeves)	2	2	2	0	1	2	0	4	1	X	14
Denmark (Hunaeus)	0	0	0	1	0	0	1	0	0	X	2

=== Draw 6 ===
March 21

Team	1	2	3	4	5	6	7	8	9	10	Final
Norway (Strømbo)	0	0	1	1	1	0	2	0	0	X	5
Denmark (Hunaeus)	2	3	0	0	0	1	0	1	1	X	8

Team	1	2	3	4	5	6	7	8	9	10	Final
Sweden (Oscarius)	1	0	1	0	3	0	0	0	1	0	6
France (Boan)	0	1	0	2	0	1	1	1	0	1	7

Team	1	2	3	4	5	6	7	8	9	10	Final
Switzerland (Oswald)	0	0	1	0	0	1	0	0	1	0	3
Scotland (Torrance)	1	1	0	0	1	0	0	1	0	2	6

Team	1	2	3	4	5	6	7	8	9	10	Final
West Germany (Kanz)	3	0	0	1	1	2	0	6	X	X	13
Italy (Ghezze)	0	1	0	0	0	0	1	0	X	X	2

Team	1	2	3	4	5	6	7	8	9	10	Final
Canada (Mazinke)	2	1	1	2	0	4	2	1	X	X	13
United States (Reeves)	0	0	0	0	1	0	0	0	X	X	1

=== Draw 7 ===
March 22

Team	1	2	3	4	5	6	7	8	9	10	11	Final
France (Boan)	0	0	0	0	1	2	0	0	1	0	0	4
Scotland (Torrance)	0	0	2	1	0	0	0	0	0	1	1	5

Team	1	2	3	4	5	6	7	8	9	10	Final
Canada (Mazinke)	0	2	0	0	0	1	0	1	0	1	5
Switzerland (Oswald)	2	0	0	1	0	0	0	0	0	0	3

Team	1	2	3	4	5	6	7	8	9	10	Final
West Germany (Kanz)	2	0	0	0	1	0	0	0	0	X	3
Norway (Strømbo)	0	0	1	1	0	2	0	0	2	X	6

Team	1	2	3	4	5	6	7	8	9	10	Final
Italy (Ghezze)	0	1	0	1	1	0	3	0	1	1	8
Denmark (Hunaeus)	2	0	2	0	0	2	0	0	0	0	6

Team	1	2	3	4	5	6	7	8	9	10	Final
Sweden (Oscarius)	1	0	0	1	0	0	0	5	0	X	7
United States (Reeves)	0	1	0	0	0	1	1	0	0	X	3

=== Draw 8 ===
March 22

Team	1	2	3	4	5	6	7	8	9	10	Final
United States (Reeves)	0	3	0	1	1	2	0	0	2	2	11
Italy (Ghezze)	1	0	1	0	0	0	1	1	0	0	4

Team	1	2	3	4	5	6	7	8	9	10	Final
Norway (Strømbo)	0	0	1	1	0	0	2	1	1	0	6
France (Boan)	1	0	0	0	2	3	0	0	0	3	9

Team	1	2	3	4	5	6	7	8	9	10	Final
Canada (Mazinke)	2	0	1	0	1	0	1	4	0	X	9
Scotland (Torrance)	0	1	0	1	0	0	0	0	1	X	3

Team	1	2	3	4	5	6	7	8	9	10	Final
West Germany (Kanz)	0	1	0	4	2	0	2	0	0	1	10
Denmark (Hunaeus)	1	0	3	0	0	3	0	1	1	0	9

Team	1	2	3	4	5	6	7	8	9	10	Final
Sweden (Oscarius)	1	0	1	2	0	1	0	2	1	X	8
Switzerland (Oswald)	0	1	0	0	3	0	1	0	0	X	5

=== Draw 9 ===
March 23

Team	1	2	3	4	5	6	7	8	9	10	Final
Norway (Strømbo)	0	0	0	0	1	0	1	0	2	X	4
Scotland (Torrance)	0	0	1	2	0	2	0	3	0	X	8

Team	1	2	3	4	5	6	7	8	9	10	Final
West Germany (Kanz)	1	1	0	0	0	0	0	1	0	X	3
United States (Reeves)	0	0	1	1	1	2	0	0	3	X	8

Team	1	2	3	4	5	6	7	8	9	10	Final
France (Boan)	1	1	2	0	0	1	0	0	1	2	8
Switzerland (Oswald)	0	0	0	1	2	0	2	0	0	0	5

Team	1	2	3	4	5	6	7	8	9	10	Final
Sweden (Oscarius)	0	1	0	0	2	0	2	1	0	X	6
Italy (Ghezze)	1	0	0	1	0	1	0	0	0	X	3

Team	1	2	3	4	5	6	7	8	9	10	Final
Canada (Mazinke)	2	0	1	1	2	1	2	2	X	X	11
Denmark (Hunaeus)	0	1	0	0	0	0	0	0	X	X	1

== Playoffs ==
Semi-final
1	Canada	6
4	Scotland	5
3	Sweden	6
2	France	5

Final
3	Sweden	6
1	Canada	5

=== Semifinals ===
Sheet B	1	2	3	4	5	6	7	8	9	10	Final
France (Boan)	0	2	0	0	0	1	0	2	0	0	5
Sweden (Oscarius)	0	0	1	0	0	0	1	0	2	2	6

Sheet D	1	2	3	4	5	6	7	8	9	10	11	Final
Scotland (Torrance)	0	0	1	2	0	1	0	1	0	0	0	5
Canada (Mazinke)	2	0	0	0	1	0	3	0	0	0	1	6

=== Final ===
Team	1	2	3	4	5	6	7	8	9	10	11	Final
Sweden (Oscarius) 🔨	0	0	1	1	1	1	1	0	0	0	1	6
Canada (Mazinke)	1	1	0	0	0	0	0	1	1	1	0	5

Player percentages
Sweden		Canada	
Boa Carlman	53%	Dan Klippenstein	65%
Tom Schaeffer	61%	George Achtymichuk	73%
Bengt Oscarius	74%	Bill Martin	77%
Kjell Oscarius	69%	Harvey Mazinke	51%
Total	60%	Total	66%

1973 Air Canada Silver Broom
(Sweden)
Sweden
1st title

== Top five player percentages ==
Leads	%
(Canada) Dan Klippenstein	68
(Sweden) Claes-Göran Carlman	66
(France) Gerard Pasquier	64
(West Germany) Manfred Schulze	62
(Scotland) Willie Kerr	60

Seconds	%
(Canada) George Achtymichuk	70
(United States) Henry Shean	66
(Sweden) Tom Schaeffer	64
(Switzerland) Rolph Oswald	63
(France) André Tronc	61

Thirds	%
(Canada) Bill Martin	77
(United States) Doug Carlson	69
(Sweden) Bengt Oscarius	68
(France) André Mabboux	65
(Scotland) Alex A. Torrance	62

Skips	%
(Canada) Harvey Mazinke	76
(Sweden) Kjell Oscarius	69
(Switzerland) Werner Oswald	67
(United States) Charles Reeves	67
(Scotland) Alex F. Torrance	66
