= Alex A. Torrance =

Scottish male curler

- Curler ♂
- Other names: Big Alex

Team
- Curling club: Hamilton & Thornyhill CC

Curling career
- Member Association: Scotland
- World Championship: 4 (1964, 1972, 1973, 1975)
Medal record
Curling
World Championships
Silver medal – second place	1964 Calgary
Scottish Men's Championship
Gold medal – first place	1964 Edinburgh
Gold medal – first place	1972
Gold medal – first place	1973
Gold medal – first place	1975

Alex A. "Big Alex" Torrance (born c. 1936) is a Scottish curler. He is a 1964 World men's championship silver medallist and four-time Scottish men's champion.

Torrance and the entirety of his 1964 Scottish champion rink were farmers from Hamilton. Torrance is the cousin of his skip on that team, also named Alex.

== Teams ==
Season	Skip	Third	Second	Lead	Events
1963–64	Alex F. Torrance	Alex A. Torrance	Robert Kirkland	Jimmy Waddell	SMCC 1964 (gold); WCC 1964 (silver)
1964–65	Alex F. Torrance	Alex A. Torrance	Robert Kirkland	Jimmy Waddell	EInt. 1965 (gold)
1966–67	Alex F. Torrance	Alex A. Torrance	Robert Kirkland	Jimmy Waddell	EInt. 1967 (gold)
1967–68	Alex F. Torrance	Alex A. Torrance	Robert Kirkland	Jimmy Waddell	EInt. 1968 (gold)
1971–72	Alex F. Torrance	Alex A. Torrance	Robert Kirkland	Jimmy Waddell	SMCC 1972 (gold); WCC 1972 (4th)
1972–73	Alex F. Torrance	Alex A. Torrance	Tom McGregor	Willie Kerr	SMCC 1973 (gold); WCC 1973 (4th)
1974–75	Alex F. Torrance	Alex A. Torrance	Tom McGregor	Willie Kerr	SMCC 1975 (gold); WCC 1975 (5th)
