= Curse of LaBonte =

Superstition in curling

The "Curse of LaBonte" was a curse in curling. It was caused by an incident at the finals of the 1972 World Curling Championships for men, the 1972 Air Canada Silver Broom in Garmisch-Partenkirchen, Germany.

== History ==
=== Incident ===
The Canadian team, skipped by Orest Meleschuk was playing the American team skipped by Robert LaBonte in the finals. Canada had been undefeated up until this point, but was down by two points in the last end. They needed two points to tie the game. Meleschuk had the "hammer", the final shot of the end. When it was time for him to shoot, the Americans had shot rock on the button while Canada was sitting second shot right next to it. The U.S. was sitting third rock with a rock biting the 8-foot. To tie the game, Meleschuk had to hit the American rock and not roll further than this third rock.

Meleschuk's rock made the hit, and it proceeded to roll into the 8-foot. When it stopped, it was close to being second, but the Americans thought otherwise, and U.S. third Frank Aasand jumped in the air to celebrate. In the meantime, Canada's third Dave Romano was still investigating which rock was second rock, and thus whether or not Canada had scored two to tie, or just one for the loss. While Romano was looking, LaBonte jumped in the air to celebrate as well, but slipped and accidentally kicked the Canadian stone. The Americans never admitted to kicking the Canadian rock, so Romano asked for a measurement, which was in the rules. The measurement showed Canada was second shot. It was not obvious who was second shot prior to LaBonte kicking the stone, nor could anyone say it was kicked closer to the centre, as no video was able to determine this. Canada stole another point in the extra end to win the championship after LaBonte was heavy with a draw for the win.

=== Curse ===
It was later said that LaBonte put a "curse" on Canada, because Canada did not win another World Championship until 1980. Canadian journalist Larry Tucker is generally considered to have been given credit for inventing the hex in 1980 to describe Canada's victory that year.

A secondary "curse", if interpreted in this way, is that a North Dakotan rink did not represent the United States again in the World Curling Championships until 1997, when Craig Disher of Langdon represented the United States.

=== Meleschuk's cigarette ===
Over time, the incident gained additional notoriety, due to being extensively replayed, because Meleschuk had delivered the crucial shot with a lit cigarette prominently dangling from his mouth. Due to curling's roots as a social game, it had long been associated with both alcohol and tobacco consumption, and even at elite levels of play smoking on the ice was neither prohibited nor widely frowned on.

Over time, as both medical and public opinion turned increasingly against smoking, the governing bodies of curling came under pressure to clean up the game's image. In Canada, this effort was complicated by the fact its national men's championship had been sponsored by MacDonald Tobacco since its inception in 1927. Finally, in 1980, Macdonald was replaced as a sponsor (albeit by a major brewery, Labatt) and smoking on the ice was banned starting with the 1980 Labatt Brier, coincidentally or not, the same year the Curse of LaBonte was broken.

Meleschuk himself later recalled that curlers were often reluctant to leave their cigarettes in an ashtray in order to deliver their shots for economic reasons—such cigarettes would often go out before they could be retrieved, rendering them unpalatable. However, he later admitted he felt "embarrassed" after seeing replays of himself smoking while delivering his famous shot, and quit smoking as a result.

== Scoreboard ==
This is the final score of the final of the 1972 Air Canada Silver Broom.

Team	1	2	3	4	5	6	7	8	9	10	11	Final
United States (LaBonte)	2	0	2	1	0	2	0	0	2	0	0	9
Canada (Meleschuk)	0	1	0	0	2	0	2	2	0	2	1	10

== Sources ==
- Canada Curls: The Illustrated History of Curling In Canada by Doug Maxwell. Whitecap Books, 2002.
