= Harvey Mazinke =

Canadian curler (born 1937)

- Curler
- Born: April 6, 1937 (age 89); Altona, Manitoba

Curling career
- Brier: 3 (1964, 1973, 1975)
- World Championship: 1 (1973)
Medal record
Representing Canada
World Curling Championships
Silver medal – second place	1973 Regina
Representing Saskatchewan
Macdonald Brier
Gold medal – first place	1973 Edmonton
Representing Manitoba
Macdonald Brier
Bronze medal – third place	1964 Charlottetown

Harvey Gordon Mazinke (born April 6, 1937) is a Canadian former curler. He was the skip of the 1973 Brier Champion team, representing Saskatchewan. He later went on to win second place at the World Championships of that year. From 1987 to 1988, he was a president of Canadian Curling Association. In 1989, he was inducted to the Canadian Curling Hall of Fame.
