= Otto Danieli =

Swiss curler and World Champion

Medal record

Representing Switzerland

Men's Curling

World championships
Gold medal – first place	1975 Perth	Team

Otto Danieli (born c. 1943) is a Swiss curler and World Champion. He won a gold medal at the 1975 World Curling Championships. He coached the West German team at the 1986 World Women's Curling Championship.
