= Gordon McTavish =

Canadian curler and judge (1925–2019)

- Curler ♂
- Born: February 19, 1925
- Died: February 21, 2019 (aged 94)

Team
- Curling club: Granite CC, Winnipeg, Manitoba

Curling career
- Member Association: Manitoba
- World Championship: 1 (1965)
Medal record
Curling
Representing Canada
World Championships
Silver medal – second place	1965 Perth

Gordon Blaine McTavish (1925 – February 21, 2019) was a Canadian curler and judge. He was a 1965 World Men's silver medallist.

Unlike his other teammates McTavish was not a 1965 Brier winner, as he replaced Ron Braunstein at second position, who was a medical student at the time and had to miss the World championships that year.

In the years 1960–1961 he was the president of the Granite Curling Club in Winnipeg.

== Personal life ==
Gordon McTavish served as a provincial court judge in Manitoba from 1971 to 1999. He was married to Milly Johnson and had two children. In addition to curling, he was involved in horse racing as an owner and judge. He graduated from Manitoba Law School and was called to the bar in 1961. He worked for the law firm Keith and Westbury before entering private practice. In 1965 he was appointed as justice of the peace for Fort Garry.

== Teams ==
Season	Skip	Third	Second	Lead	Events
1964–65	Terry Braunstein	Don Duguid	Gordon McTavish	Ray Turnbull	WCC 1965 (silver)
