= 1995 Canadian Senior Curling Championships =

The 1995 CIBC Canadian Senior Curling Championships were held January 21 to 29 at the Thistle-St. Andrews Curling Club in Saint John, New Brunswick.

== Men's ==
=== Teams ===
Province / Territory	Skip	Third	Second	Lead
Alberta	Don McCann	Steve Gillies	Mervin Peesker	Les Santa
Nova Scotia	Ted Lohnes	Don Fancy	Bob Skinner	Eric Adams
British Columbia	Wayne Matthewson	Jack Finnbogason	Bob Byrne	Fuji Miki
Ontario	Bill Dickie	Thom Pritchard	Keith MacGregor	George Dolejsi
Manitoba	Barry Fry	Don Duguid	Terry Braunstein	Ray Turnbull
Prince Edward Island	Roger Goss	Bob Dillon	John Stewart	Paul Szczygiel
New Brunswick	David Sullivan	Charlie Sullivan Sr.	Rolly Lord	Bill Ayer
Quebec	Wayne Byers	Brian Hiller	J. Phillip Knox	Tony Greig
Newfoundland	Damien Ryan	Fred Wight	Frank Noseworthy	Boyd Day
Saskatchewan	Glenn Pryor	Gord Widger	Stan Toporowski	Edwin Fusick
Northern Ontario	Bill Tetley	Bo Britton	Jerry Whittaker	Dan Pozihun
Yukon/Northwest Territories	Perry Savoie	Gordon Hagen	Robert Frederickson	Vincent Hunter

=== Standings ===
Locale	Skip	W	L
Saskatchewan	Glenn Pryor	9	2
Ontario	Bill Dickie	8	3
Manitoba	Barry Fry	8	3
New Brunswick	David Sullivan	7	4
Alberta	Don McCann	7	4
Northern Ontario	Bill Tetley	6	5
Quebec	Wayne Byers	5	6
Nova Scotia	Ted Lohnes	5	6
British Columbia	Wayne Matthewson	5	6
Prince Edward Island	Roger Goss	3	8
Newfoundland	Damien Ryan	2	9
Yukon/Northwest Territories	Perry Savoie	1	10

=== Results ===
==== Draw 1 ====
Sheet B	1	2	3	4	5	6	7	8	9	10	Final
Quebec (Byers)	0	1	0	3	1	0	2	3	0	X	10
Yukon/Northwest Territories (Savoie)	1	0	1	0	0	2	0	0	3	X	7

Sheet D	1	2	3	4	5	6	7	8	9	10	11	Final
Northern Ontario (Tetley)	0	0	0	1	3	0	2	0	0	0	1	7
Newfoundland (Ryan)	1	0	0	0	0	3	0	1	0	1	0	6

Sheet F	1	2	3	4	5	6	7	8	9	10	11	Final
Prince Edward Island (Goss)	0	1	0	1	0	0	1	0	0	1	0	4
New Brunswick (Sullivan)	0	0	1	0	0	1	0	1	1	0	1	5

Sheet H	1	2	3	4	5	6	7	8	9	10	11	Final
Nova Scotia (Lohnes)	0	1	0	2	1	0	0	1	2	1	0	8
Manitoba (Fry)	2	0	2	0	0	1	3	0	0	0	1	9

==== Draw 2 ====
Sheet A	1	2	3	4	5	6	7	8	9	10	Final
Manitoba (Fry)	0	0	0	1	1	0	1	0	X	X	3
Saskatchewan (Pryor)	0	2	1	0	0	3	0	4	X	X	10

Sheet C	1	2	3	4	5	6	7	8	9	10	Final
Alberta (McCann)	1	2	0	2	0	0	2	0	1	0	8
British Columbia (Matthewson)	0	0	2	0	3	1	0	1	0	2	9

Sheet E	1	2	3	4	5	6	7	8	9	10	11	Final
Nova Scotia (Lohnes)	1	1	0	1	0	1	0	2	0	1	0	7
Ontario (Dickie)	0	0	3	0	2	0	1	0	1	0	2	9

Sheet G	1	2	3	4	5	6	7	8	9	10	Final
Yukon/Northwest Territories (Savoie)	1	0	0	2	0	1	0	0	0	X	4
Newfoundland (Ryan)	0	1	2	0	2	0	1	1	1	X	8

==== Draw 3 ====
Sheet D	1	2	3	4	5	6	7	8	9	10	Final
Prince Edward Island (Goss)	1	2	0	0	0	2	0	2	0	X	7
Yukon/Northwest Territories (Savoie)	0	0	1	1	0	0	1	0	1	X	4

Sheet F	1	2	3	4	5	6	7	8	9	10	Final
Ontario (Dickie)	2	0	1	0	1	0	3	0	1	X	8
Saskatchewan (Pryor)	0	1	0	1	0	1	0	2	0	X	5

==== Draw 4 ====
Sheet A	1	2	3	4	5	6	7	8	9	10	Final
Alberta (McCann)	1	1	1	0	1	0	0	3	0	2	9
Prince Edward Island (Goss)	0	0	0	1	0	4	0	0	3	0	8

Sheet C	1	2	3	4	5	6	7	8	9	10	11	12	Final
Newfoundland (Ryan)	0	1	0	0	1	0	1	1	0	1	0	0	5
Ontario (Dickie)	1	0	2	0	0	0	0	0	2	0	0	1	6

Sheet E	1	2	3	4	5	6	7	8	9	10	Final
Quebec (Byers)	0	0	0	0	2	0	2	0	1	2	7
Northern Ontario (Tetley)	2	0	0	2	0	2	0	2	0	0	8

Sheet G	1	2	3	4	5	6	7	8	9	10	Final
British Columbia (Matthewson)	0	0	0	0	0	0	0	0	X	X	0
New Brunswick (Sullivan)	1	1	1	0	1	1	1	1	X	X	7

==== Draw 5 ====
Sheet B	1	2	3	4	5	6	7	8	9	10	11	Final
Saskatchewan (Pryor)	1	0	0	2	0	0	1	1	0	3	1	9
British Columbia (Matthewson)	0	0	2	0	2	3	0	0	1	0	0	8

Sheet D	1	2	3	4	5	6	7	8	9	10	Final
Manitoba (Fry)	1	0	0	0	2	0	2	0	2	X	7
Alberta (McCann)	0	1	0	0	0	1	0	2	0	X	4

Sheet F	1	2	3	4	5	6	7	8	9	10	Final
New Brunswick (Sullivan)	0	2	0	3	1	0	4	0	1	X	11
Quebec (Byers)	2	0	1	0	0	2	0	1	0	X	6

Sheet H	1	2	3	4	5	6	7	8	9	10	11	Final
Northern Ontario (Tetley)	2	0	1	0	3	0	0	0	2	0	1	9
Nova Scotia (Lohnes)	0	2	0	1	0	2	1	1	0	1	0	8

==== Draw 6 ====
Sheet A	1	2	3	4	5	6	7	8	9	10	Final
New Brunswick (Sullivan)	2	0	0	1	1	0	0	1	0	1	6
Northern Ontario (Tetley)	0	1	1	0	0	1	2	0	2	0	7

Sheet C	1	2	3	4	5	6	7	8	9	10	Final
Manitoba (Fry)	2	2	0	2	0	1	1	0	1	X	9
Prince Edward Island (Goss)	0	0	1	0	2	0	0	1	0	X	4

Sheet E	1	2	3	4	5	6	7	8	9	10	Final
British Columbia (Matthewson)	1	0	0	0	0	4	0	1	0	X	6
Quebec (Byers)	0	2	1	1	2	0	2	0	1	X	9

Sheet G	1	2	3	4	5	6	7	8	9	10	Final
Nova Scotia (Lohnes)	2	0	1	0	0	0	1	1	0	2	7
Alberta (McCann)	0	1	0	1	1	0	0	0	3	0	6

==== Draw 7 ====
Sheet B	1	2	3	4	5	6	7	8	9	10	Final
Ontario (Dickie)	1	0	0	0	1	0	1	0	2	0	5
British Columbia (Matthewson)	0	2	0	1	0	1	0	2	0	1	7

Sheet D	1	2	3	4	5	6	7	8	9	10	Final
Quebec (Byers)	2	0	2	0	0	1	0	0	0	X	5
Nova Scotia (Lohnes)	0	2	0	2	1	0	2	1	1	X	9

Sheet F	1	2	3	4	5	6	7	8	9	10	Final
Alberta (McCann)	2	1	3	0	0	0	1	0	1	X	8
Yukon/Northwest Territories (Savoie)	0	0	0	1	1	1	0	1	0	X	4

Sheet H	1	2	3	4	5	6	7	8	9	10	Final
Newfoundland (Ryan)	4	0	0	1	0	2	1	1	0	0	9
Saskatchewan (Pryor)	0	2	2	0	3	0	0	0	1	2	10

==== Draw 8 ====
Sheet A	1	2	3	4	5	6	7	8	9	10	Final
Yukon/Northwest Territories (Savoie)	1	0	1	0	1	0	1	0	X	X	4
Ontario (Dickie)	0	2	0	2	0	4	0	2	X	X	10

Sheet C	1	2	3	4	5	6	7	8	9	10	Final
Saskatchewan (Pryor)	2	0	3	0	2	2	0	0	0	X	9
New Brunswick (Sullivan)	0	1	0	0	0	0	1	2	1	X	5

Sheet E	1	2	3	4	5	6	7	8	9	10	Final
Northern Ontario (Tetley)	1	0	0	1	0	0	0	2	0	X	4
Manitoba (Fry)	0	1	1	0	1	1	3	0	1	X	8

Sheet G	1	2	3	4	5	6	7	8	9	10	Final
Prince Edward Island (Goss)	0	2	0	0	2	1	1	0	1	X	7
Newfoundland (Ryan)	0	0	1	1	0	0	0	1	0	X	3

==== Draw 9 ====
Sheet B	1	2	3	4	5	6	7	8	9	10	Final
New Brunswick (Sullivan)	0	0	0	0	3	0	0	0	0	X	3
Nova Scotia (Lohnes)	1	1	1	3	0	0	1	1	1	X	9

Sheet D	1	2	3	4	5	6	7	8	9	10	Final
Saskatchewan (Pryor)	2	0	0	1	1	1	0	0	3	X	8
Quebec (Byers)	0	1	1	0	0	0	1	1	0	X	4

Sheet F	1	2	3	4	5	6	7	8	9	10	11	Final
British Columbia (Matthewson)	0	0	1	2	0	1	0	0	2	1	1	8
Northern Ontario (Tetley)	0	4	0	0	1	0	1	1	0	0	0	7

Sheet H	1	2	3	4	5	6	7	8	9	10	Final
Alberta (McCann)	2	1	0	0	1	2	0	2	0	X	8
Newfoundland (Ryan)	0	0	2	0	0	0	1	0	1	X	4

==== Draw 10 ====
Sheet A	1	2	3	4	5	6	7	8	9	10	Final
Ontario (Dickie)	0	1	0	0	0	1	1	0	1	0	4
New Brunswick (Sullivan)	0	0	2	1	1	0	0	1	0	1	6

Sheet C	1	2	3	4	5	6	7	8	9	10	Final
Yukon/Northwest Territories (Savoie)	0	0	0	2	0	1	0	1	0	X	4
Saskatchewan (Pryor)	1	1	1	0	2	0	2	0	2	X	9

Sheet E	1	2	3	4	5	6	7	8	9	10	Final
Nova Scotia (Lohnes)	2	1	0	0	1	1	0	3	X	X	8
Prince Edward Island (Goss)	0	0	1	0	0	0	1	0	X	X	2

Sheet G	1	2	3	4	5	6	7	8	9	10	Final
Quebec (Byers)	1	0	1	0	2	1	0	2	1	X	8
Manitoba (Fry)	0	1	0	3	0	0	1	0	0	X	5

==== Draw 11 ====
Sheet B	1	2	3	4	5	6	7	8	9	10	Final
Northern Ontario (Tetley)	0	0	0	1	1	0	2	0	1	0	5
Alberta (McCann)	1	1	1	0	0	1	0	1	0	3	8

Sheet D	1	2	3	4	5	6	7	8	9	10	Final
Prince Edward Island (Goss)	2	0	0	0	0	1	0	0	1	X	4
Ontario (Dickie)	0	1	0	1	1	0	2	1	0	X	6

Sheet F	1	2	3	4	5	6	7	8	9	10	Final
Newfoundland (Ryan)	1	0	2	0	0	1	0	2	0	X	6
British Columbia (Matthewson)	0	2	0	3	0	0	2	0	2	X	9

Sheet H	1	2	3	4	5	6	7	8	9	10	Final
Manitoba (Fry)	1	0	3	0	5	0	0	1	X	X	10
Yukon/Northwest Territories (Savoie)	0	1	0	1	0	2	0	0	X	X	3

==== Draw 12 ====
Sheet A	1	2	3	4	5	6	7	8	9	10	Final
Manitoba (Fry)	0	1	2	2	0	4	X	X	X	X	9
Newfoundland (Ryan)	0	0	0	0	1	0	X	X	X	X	1

Sheet C	1	2	3	4	5	6	7	8	9	10	Final
Nova Scotia (Lohnes)	0	2	1	1	0	0	4	1	X	X	9
Yukon/Northwest Territories (Savoie)	1	0	0	0	1	1	0	0	X	X	3

Sheet E	1	2	3	4	5	6	7	8	9	10	Final
Alberta (McCann)	1	0	0	2	1	0	1	0	1	X	6
Ontario (Dickie)	0	1	0	0	0	1	0	1	0	X	3

Sheet G	1	2	3	4	5	6	7	8	9	10	Final
Saskatchewan (Pryor)	2	0	2	1	0	4	0	0	1	X	10
Northern Ontario (Tetley)	0	2	0	0	1	0	1	1	0	X	5

==== Draw 13 ====
Sheet B	1	2	3	4	5	6	7	8	9	10	Final
Quebec (Byers)	0	0	1	0	2	0	0	0	0	0	3
Alberta (McCann)	0	0	0	2	0	0	0	0	2	1	5

Sheet D	1	2	3	4	5	6	7	8	9	10	Final
Yukon/Northwest Territories (Savoie)	0	2	0	1	0	2	0	2	0	X	7
British Columbia (Matthewson)	0	0	3	0	0	0	1	0	1	X	5

Sheet F	1	2	3	4	5	6	7	8	9	10	Final
Northern Ontario (Tetley)	0	2	0	1	2	2	0	0	2	1	10
Prince Edward Island (Goss)	2	0	2	0	0	0	2	3	0	0	9

Sheet H	1	2	3	4	5	6	7	8	9	10	Final
New Brunswick (Sullivan)	1	0	0	2	0	0	0	1	0	0	4
Manitoba (Fry)	0	2	0	0	2	0	0	0	0	1	5

==== Draw 14 ====
Sheet A	1	2	3	4	5	6	7	8	9	10	Final
Prince Edward Island (Goss)	1	0	2	1	0	0	0	0	0	X	4
Saskatchewan (Pryor)	0	1	0	0	1	0	2	1	1	X	6

Sheet C	1	2	3	4	5	6	7	8	9	10	Final
Ontario (Dickie)	4	0	3	0	1	1	0	0	1	X	10
Quebec (Byers)	0	1	0	1	0	0	1	2	0	X	5

Sheet E	1	2	3	4	5	6	7	8	9	10	Final
Newfoundland (Ryan)	1	0	2	1	0	1	0	2	0	0	7
New Brunswick (Sullivan)	0	3	0	0	3	0	2	0	1	1	10

Sheet G	1	2	3	4	5	6	7	8	9	10	Final
British Columbia (Matthewson)	1	2	0	1	0	2	1	2	X	X	9
Nova Scotia (Lohnes)	0	0	2	0	1	0	0	0	X	X	3

==== Draw 15 ====
Sheet B	1	2	3	4	5	6	7	8	9	10	11	Final
Yukon/Northwest Territories (Savoie)	0	0	1	0	1	0	0	0	0	2	0	4
New Brunswick (Sullivan)	0	0	0	2	0	0	0	1	1	0	1	5

Sheet D	1	2	3	4	5	6	7	8	9	10	Final
Newfoundland (Ryan)	0	0	1	0	1	0	0	1	0	X	3
Quebec (Byers)	0	2	0	2	0	0	1	0	2	X	7

Sheet F	1	2	3	4	5	6	7	8	9	10	Final
Manitoba (Fry)	0	0	0	0	2	1	0	0	0	X	3
Ontario (Dickie)	0	2	1	2	0	0	2	1	2	X	10

Sheet H	1	2	3	4	5	6	7	8	9	10	Final
Prince Edward Island (Goss)	1	0	0	0	2	0	0	0	2	1	6
British Columbia (Matthewson)	0	1	0	1	0	1	1	1	0	0	5

==== Draw 16 ====
Sheet A	1	2	3	4	5	6	7	8	9	10	Final
Nova Scotia (Lohnes)	1	0	1	3	0	0	2	0	1	0	8
Newfoundland (Ryan)	0	2	0	0	2	1	0	2	0	2	9

Sheet C	1	2	3	4	5	6	7	8	9	10	Final
British Columbia (Matthewson)	2	0	2	1	0	3	0	1	0	0	9
Manitoba (Fry)	0	3	0	0	4	0	1	0	1	1	10

Sheet E	1	2	3	4	5	6	7	8	9	10	Final
Alberta (McCann)	0	0	0	1	0	2	0	0	3	1	7
Saskatchewan (Pryor)	0	0	1	0	1	0	3	1	0	0	6

Sheet G	1	2	3	4	5	6	7	8	9	10	Final
Ontario (Dickie)	1	0	1	0	2	0	1	4	X	X	9
Northern Ontario (Tetley)	0	1	0	1	0	1	0	0	X	X	3

==== Draw 17 ====
Sheet B	1	2	3	4	5	6	7	8	9	10	Final
Northern Ontario (Tetley)	3	4	2	3	0	X	X	X	X	X	12
Yukon/Northwest Territories (Savoie)	0	0	0	0	1	X	X	X	X	X	1

Sheet D	1	2	3	4	5	6	7	8	9	10	11	Final
New Brunswick (Sullivan)	0	3	0	1	0	0	0	1	0	2	1	8
Alberta (McCann)	1	0	2	0	2	0	1	0	1	0	0	7

Sheet F	1	2	3	4	5	6	7	8	9	10	Final
Saskatchewan (Pryor)	0	1	0	1	0	2	0	2	0	X	6
Nova Scotia (Lohnes)	0	0	0	0	0	0	2	0	1	X	3

Sheet H	1	2	3	4	5	6	7	8	9	10	Final
Quebec (Byers)	1	0	2	0	0	2	0	0	1	2	8
Prince Edward Island (Goss)	0	2	0	1	1	0	1	1	0	0	6

=== Playoffs ===
Semifinal		Final
Ontario	7
Manitoba	6	Saskatchewan	4
		Ontario	7

==== Semifinal ====
Sheet F	1	2	3	4	5	6	7	8	9	10	Final
Ontario (Dickie)	0	2	0	0	0	0	2	0	2	1	7
Manitoba (Fry)	2	0	1	0	1	1	0	1	0	0	6

Player percentages
Ontario		Manitoba	
George Dolejsi	76%	Ray Turnbull	79%
Keith MacGregor	59%	Terry Braunstein	74%
Thom Pritchard	57%	Don Duguid	61%
Bill Dickie	74%	Barry Fry	54%
Total	67%	Total	67%

==== Final ====
Sheet E	1	2	3	4	5	6	7	8	9	10	Final
Saskatchewan (Pryor)	1	0	1	0	0	0	0	2	0	0	4
Ontario (Dickie)	0	1	0	0	0	1	1	0	2	2	7

Player percentages
Saskatchewan		Ontario	
Edwin Fusick	80%	George Dolejsi	80%
Stan Toporowski	74%	Keith MacGregor	57%
Gord Widger	74%	Thom Pritchard	68%
Glenn Pryor	65%	Bill Dickie	89%
Total	73%	Total	73%

== Women's ==
=== Teams ===
Province / Territory	Skip	Third	Second	Lead
Alberta	Dorothy Goulet	Lori Kosh	Jenny Pollard	Jackie Reid
Nova Scotia	Jean Skinner	Sheila Clark	Faye Conrad	Dorothy Robeson
British Columbia	Eve Skakun	Una Hazen	Sandy Allen	Elizabeth Karpluk
Ontario	Ellie Kompch	Lucille Scott	Carole Kirschner	Pat Rumsam
Manitoba	Edith Carter	Louise Goodbrandson	Marilyn Manko	Dot Dmyterko
Prince Edward Island	Marnie Noye	Ann Currie	Mabel Gardiner	Annetta Walsh
New Brunswick	Carol Spidell	Ruth Blacklock	Margie Evans	Betty Peppard
Quebec	Michele Page	Pauline Page	Aline Godin	Ghislaine Goulet
Newfoundland	Jean Rockwell	Cynthia Hudson	Catherine Stanley	Jane Browne
Saskatchewan	Shirley Nelson	Maureen Schmidt	Myrna Gehli	Jean Lawson
Northern Ontario	Sheila Ross	Linda Anderson	Barbara Gordon	Rae D'Agostino
Yukon/Northwest Territories	Merna Hensley	Marcy Savoie	Gwen Byram	Jeanne Hagen

=== Standings ===
Locale	Skip	W	L
Northern Ontario	Sheila Ross	9	2
Quebec	Michele Page	7	4
Ontario	Ellie Kompch	7	4
British Columbia	Eve Skakun	6	5
Alberta	Dorothy Goulet	6	5
Newfoundland	Jean Rockwell	6	5
Manitoba	Edith Carter	5	6
Prince Edward Island	Marnie Noye	5	6
Nova Scotia	Jean Skinner	4	7
Yukon/Northwest Territories	Merna Hensley	4	7
New Brunswick	Carol Spidell	4	7
Saskatchewan	Shirley Nelson	3	8

=== Results ===
==== Draw 1 ====
Sheet A	1	2	3	4	5	6	7	8	9	10	Final
Yukon/Northwest Territories (Hensley)	0	0	1	0	0	2	1	0	0	X	4
Northern Ontario (Ross)	2	1	0	0	1	0	0	3	2	X	9

Sheet C	1	2	3	4	5	6	7	8	9	10	Final
Alberta (Goulet)	0	4	0	1	0	0	0	1	2	X	8
Manitoba (Carter)	1	0	1	0	3	1	0	0	0	X	6

Sheet E	1	2	3	4	5	6	7	8	9	10	Final
New Brunswick (Spidell)	4	1	0	0	2	2	0	1	X	X	10
Saskatchewan (Nelson)	0	0	0	1	0	0	1	0	X	X	2

Sheet G	1	2	3	4	5	6	7	8	9	10	Final
Nova Scotia (Skinner)	1	0	3	0	1	0	0	0	2	X	7
Newfoundland (Rockwell)	0	1	0	2	0	2	2	3	0	X	10

==== Draw 2 ====
Sheet B	1	2	3	4	5	6	7	8	9	10	Final
Newfoundland (Rockwell)	3	0	1	0	1	2	2	0	1	X	10
Saskatchewan (Nelson)	0	1	0	2	0	0	0	2	0	X	5

Sheet D	1	2	3	4	5	6	7	8	9	10	Final
Yukon/Northwest Territories (Hensley)	1	2	0	1	0	0	1	3	0	X	8
Quebec (Page)	0	0	1	0	1	2	0	0	2	X	6

Sheet F	1	2	3	4	5	6	7	8	9	10	Final
British Columbia (Skakun)	2	0	1	0	0	1	0	2	0	3	9
Ontario (Kompch)	0	1	0	1	0	0	3	0	2	0	7

Sheet H	1	2	3	4	5	6	7	8	9	10	Final
Northern Ontario (Ross)	0	1	0	1	0	2	1	0	2	0	7
Prince Edward Island (Noye)	1	0	4	0	1	0	0	1	0	1	8

==== Draw 3 ====
Sheet C	1	2	3	4	5	6	7	8	9	10	Final
Quebec (Page)	2	2	2	0	1	0	2	0	6	X	15
Prince Edward Island (Noye)	0	0	0	2	0	1	0	1	0	X	4

Sheet E	1	2	3	4	5	6	7	8	9	10	Final
Alberta (Goulet)	0	1	0	1	0	0	2	1	0	X	5
Newfoundland (Rockwell)	1	0	2	0	3	1	0	0	1	X	8

==== Draw 4 ====
Sheet B	1	2	3	4	5	6	7	8	9	10	Final
Ontario (Kompch)	0	1	1	1	0	2	0	3	0	X	8
Manitoba (Carter)	1	0	0	0	1	0	1	0	1	X	4

Sheet D	1	2	3	4	5	6	7	8	9	10	Final
Nova Scotia (Skinner)	3	1	0	3	1	3	1	X	X	X	12
New Brunswick (Spidell)	0	0	1	0	0	0	0	X	X	X	1

Sheet F	1	2	3	4	5	6	7	8	9	10	Final
Saskatchewan (Nelson)	3	0	0	2	0	0	0	0	1	0	6
Quebec (Page)	0	1	0	0	0	1	1	1	0	3	7

Sheet H	1	2	3	4	5	6	7	8	9	10	Final
British Columbia (Skakun)	2	0	1	0	0	2	0	0	X	X	5
Alberta (Goulet)	0	1	0	3	3	0	3	2	X	X	12

==== Draw 5 ====
Sheet A	1	2	3	4	5	6	7	8	9	10	Final
New Brunswick (Spidell)	0	2	0	2	0	1	0	1	1	0	7
Yukon/Northwest Territories (Hensley)	1	0	2	0	2	0	2	0	0	1	8

Sheet C	1	2	3	4	5	6	7	8	9	10	Final
Manitoba (Carter)	1	1	1	0	3	0	1	0	2	X	9
Nova Scotia (Skinner)	0	0	0	1	0	2	0	1	0	X	4

Sheet E	1	2	3	4	5	6	7	8	9	10	Final
Northern Ontario (Ross)	1	1	0	2	0	1	1	0	1	0	7
British Columbia (Skakun)	0	0	1	0	2	0	0	2	0	1	6

Sheet G	1	2	3	4	5	6	7	8	9	10	Final
Prince Edward Island (Noye)	2	1	0	1	3	1	0	0	0	1	9
Ontario (Kompch)	0	0	1	0	0	0	1	2	2	0	6

==== Draw 6 ====
Sheet B	1	2	3	4	5	6	7	8	9	10	Final
Yukon/Northwest Territories (Hensley)	1	1	0	0	2	0	1	2	2	0	9
British Columbia (Skakun)	0	0	2	4	0	3	0	0	0	1	10

Sheet D	1	2	3	4	5	6	7	8	9	10	Final
Ontario (Kompch)	3	1	0	3	2	0	1	1	X	X	11
Nova Scotia (Skinner)	0	0	1	0	0	1	0	0	X	X	2

Sheet F	1	2	3	4	5	6	7	8	9	10	Final
Northern Ontario (Ross)	0	5	1	1	0	4	X	X	X	X	11
Alberta (Goulet)	1	0	0	0	1	0	X	X	X	X	2

Sheet H	1	2	3	4	5	6	7	8	9	10	Final
Manitoba (Carter)	1	1	0	2	0	1	0	3	0	0	8
New Brunswick (Spidell)	0	0	1	0	3	0	2	0	1	0	7

==== Draw 7 ====
Sheet A	1	2	3	4	5	6	7	8	9	10	Final
Saskatchewan (Nelson)	1	1	4	1	4	2	X	X	X	X	13
Prince Edward Island (Noye)	0	0	0	0	0	0	X	X	X	X	0

Sheet C	1	2	3	4	5	6	7	8	9	10	Final
British Columbia (Skakun)	0	1	0	0	2	0	3	0	0	X	6
Newfoundland (Rockwell)	1	0	1	0	0	0	0	1	1	X	4

Sheet E	1	2	3	4	5	6	7	8	9	10	Final
Nova Scotia (Skinner)	6	1	2	0	3	0	1	0	X	X	13
Yukon/Northwest Territories (Hensley)	0	0	0	1	0	1	0	1	X	X	3

Sheet G	1	2	3	4	5	6	7	8	9	10	Final
Quebec (Page)	2	1	2	1	0	3	0	0	4	X	13
Ontario (Kompch)	0	0	0	0	1	0	1	2	0	X	4

==== Draw 8 ====
Sheet B	1	2	3	4	5	6	7	8	9	10	Final
Alberta (Goulet)	0	2	2	0	4	0	2	0	4	X	14
Saskatchewan (Nelson)	0	0	0	1	0	2	0	3	0	X	6

Sheet D	1	2	3	4	5	6	7	8	9	10	Final
New Brunswick (Spidell)	1	0	0	0	0	2	0	2	0	X	5
Northern Ontario (Ross)	0	4	2	2	2	0	1	0	2	X	13

Sheet F	1	2	3	4	5	6	7	8	9	10	Final
Prince Edward Island (Noye)	1	0	0	0	2	0	0	3	0	X	6
Manitoba (Carter)	0	2	2	1	0	1	1	0	2	X	9

Sheet H	1	2	3	4	5	6	7	8	9	10	Final
Newfoundland (Rockwell)	1	0	0	1	0	0	1	0	X	X	3
Quebec (Page)	0	2	1	0	3	1	0	2	X	X	9

==== Draw 9 ====
Sheet A	1	2	3	4	5	6	7	8	9	10	Final
British Columbia (Skakun)	0	1	0	1	3	0	2	0	0	0	7
Saskatchewan (Nelson)	1	0	2	0	0	3	0	1	1	1	9

Sheet C	1	2	3	4	5	6	7	8	9	10	Final
Ontario (Kompch)	1	2	1	2	2	3	X	X	X	X	11
New Brunswick (Spidell)	0	0	0	0	0	0	X	X	X	X	0

Sheet E	1	2	3	4	5	6	7	8	9	10	11	Final
Prince Edward Island (Noye)	0	0	0	2	0	2	0	2	0	3	0	9
Nova Scotia (Skinner)	3	1	1	0	1	0	1	0	2	0	1	10

Sheet G	1	2	3	4	5	6	7	8	9	10	Final
Manitoba (Carter)	0	0	1	0	4	1	0	0	0	0	6
Yukon/Northwest Territories (Hensley)	1	1	0	1	0	0	2	1	1	1	8

==== Draw 10 ====
Sheet B	1	2	3	4	5	6	7	8	9	10	Final
Nova Scotia (Skinner)	1	0	0	0	2	0	0	X	X	X	3
Northern Ontario (Ross)	0	3	3	2	0	5	1	X	X	X	14

Sheet D	1	2	3	4	5	6	7	8	9	10	11	Final
Yukon/Northwest Territories (Hensley)	0	0	2	1	0	0	1	1	1	0	0	6
Alberta (Goulet)	1	0	0	0	3	1	0	0	0	1	1	7

Sheet F	1	2	3	4	5	6	7	8	9	10	11	Final
Newfoundland (Rockwell)	0	0	2	0	1	0	1	1	2	1	1	9
Prince Edward Island (Noye)	1	1	0	4	0	2	0	0	0	0	0	8

Sheet H	1	2	3	4	5	6	7	8	9	10	Final
Quebec (Page)	0	0	1	0	0	0	0	1	1	3	6
Manitoba (Carter)	0	0	0	0	0	1	1	0	0	0	2

==== Draw 11 ====
Sheet A	1	2	3	4	5	6	7	8	9	10	Final
Northern Ontario (Ross)	1	1	1	1	0	0	0	2	1	X	7
Newfoundland (Rockwell)	0	0	0	0	1	1	0	0	0	X	2

Sheet C	1	2	3	4	5	6	7	8	9	10	Final
Saskatchewan (Nelson)	0	0	1	0	0	1	0	0	1	X	3
Ontario (Kompch)	1	1	0	0	2	0	1	2	0	X	7

Sheet E	1	2	3	4	5	6	7	8	9	10	Final
Alberta (Goulet)	1	0	2	0	2	1	3	0	2	X	11
Quebec (Page)	0	2	0	1	0	0	0	2	0	X	5

Sheet G	1	2	3	4	5	6	7	8	9	10	Final
New Brunswick (Spidell)	2	0	3	1	0	0	0	4	X	X	10
British Columbia (Skakun)	0	1	0	0	2	0	1	0	X	X	4

==== Draw 12 ====
Sheet B	1	2	3	4	5	6	7	8	9	10	Final
Prince Edward Island (Noye)	0	2	0	0	1	2	0	2	2	X	9
New Brunswick (Spidell)	2	0	0	1	0	0	2	0	0	X	5

Sheet D	1	2	3	4	5	6	7	8	9	10	Final
British Columbia (Skakun)	3	0	3	0	2	0	2	3	X	X	13
Quebec (Page)	0	1	0	1	0	1	0	0	X	X	3

Sheet F	1	2	3	4	5	6	7	8	9	10	Final
Yukon/Northwest Territories (Hensley)	1	0	0	0	0	2	0	1	0	X	4
Newfoundland (Rockwell)	0	1	2	1	1	0	1	0	1	X	7

Sheet H	1	2	3	4	5	6	7	8	9	10	Final
Northern Ontario (Ross)	1	1	2	0	0	1	1	0	1	X	7
Saskatchewan (Nelson)	0	0	0	1	2	0	0	1	0	X	4

==== Draw 13 ====
Sheet A	1	2	3	4	5	6	7	8	9	10	Final
Manitoba (Carter)	0	1	0	0	0	1	0	0	X	X	2
Northern Ontario (Ross)	1	0	1	1	1	0	1	3	X	X	8

Sheet C	1	2	3	4	5	6	7	8	9	10	Final
New Brunswick (Spidell)	1	0	0	2	0	0	1	0	0	3	7
Alberta (Goulet)	0	0	1	0	1	1	0	2	1	0	6

Sheet E	1	2	3	4	5	6	7	8	9	10	Final
Newfoundland (Rockwell)	0	0	1	1	1	0	2	2	0	X	7
Ontario (Kompch)	1	1	0	0	0	1	0	0	1	X	4

Sheet G	1	2	3	4	5	6	7	8	9	10	Final
Nova Scotia (Skinner)	0	2	2	0	0	2	2	0	0	3	11
British Columbia (Skakun)	2	0	0	1	3	0	0	3	1	0	10

==== Draw 14 ====
Sheet B	1	2	3	4	5	6	7	8	9	10	Final
Ontario (Kompch)	3	1	0	2	0	1	2	1	X	X	10
Yukon/Northwest Territories (Hensley)	0	0	2	0	2	0	0	0	X	X	4

Sheet D	1	2	3	4	5	6	7	8	9	10	Final
Saskatchewan (Nelson)	1	0	1	0	0	0	2	0	0	X	4
Manitoba (Carter)	0	1	0	3	1	3	0	1	1	X	10

Sheet F	1	2	3	4	5	6	7	8	9	10	Final
Quebec (Page)	0	1	2	1	1	1	0	1	1	X	8
Nova Scotia (Skinner)	0	0	0	0	0	0	3	0	0	X	3

Sheet H	1	2	3	4	5	6	7	8	9	10	Final
Alberta (Goulet)	0	1	0	0	3	0	2	0	0	X	6
Prince Edward Island (Noye)	2	0	1	1	0	2	0	2	1	X	9

==== Draw 15 ====
Sheet A	1	2	3	4	5	6	7	8	9	10	Final
Alberta (Goulet)	1	0	1	0	2	0	1	0	0	X	5
Ontario (Kompch)	0	1	0	4	0	1	9	3	3	X	12

Sheet C	1	2	3	4	5	6	7	8	9	10	Final
Northern Ontario (Ross)	2	1	0	2	2	0	0	1	0	X	8
Quebec (Page)	0	0	1	0	0	1	1	0	1	X	4

Sheet E	1	2	3	4	5	6	7	8	9	10	Final
Saskatchewan (Nelson)	0	0	1	0	1	0	2	1	1	0	6
Nova Scotia (Skinner)	1	2	0	1	0	0	0	0	0	1	5

Sheet G	1	2	3	4	5	6	7	8	9	10	Final
Newfoundland (Rockwell)	1	2	0	2	1	1	0	2	2	0	11
Manitoba (Carter)	0	0	4	0	0	0	3	0	0	5	12

==== Draw 16 ====
Sheet B	1	2	3	4	5	6	7	8	9	10	Final
Quebec (Page)	1	0	1	3	1	1	1	0	2	X	10
New Brunswick (Spidell)	0	4	0	0	0	0	0	1	0	X	5

Sheet D	1	2	3	4	5	6	7	8	9	10	Final
British Columbia (Skakun)	4	1	0	1	1	0	2	X	X	X	9
Prince Edward Island (Noye)	0	0	1	0	0	1	0	X	X	X	2

Sheet F	1	2	3	4	5	6	7	8	9	10	Final
Ontario (Kompch)	0	3	1	0	1	2	0	0	5	X	12
Northern Ontario (Ross)	1	0	0	2	0	0	2	1	0	X	6

Sheet H	1	2	3	4	5	6	7	8	9	10	Final
Yukon/Northwest Territories (Hensley)	4	1	2	0	2	1	2	X	X	X	12
Saskatchewan (Nelson)	0	0	0	2	0	0	0	X	X	X	2

==== Draw 17 ====
Sheet A	1	2	3	4	5	6	7	8	9	10	Final
Nova Scotia (Skinner)	2	0	0	0	0	0	0	X	X	X	2
Alberta (Goulet)	0	2	0	2	1	3	2	X	X	X	10

Sheet C	1	2	3	4	5	6	7	8	9	10	Final
Prince Edward Island (Noye)	2	1	0	0	0	1	1	2	0	1	8
Yukon/Northwest Territories (Hensley)	0	0	2	1	1	0	0	0	2	0	6

Sheet E	1	2	3	4	5	6	7	8	9	10	Final
Manitoba (Carter)	0	2	0	1	0	0	0	0	X	X	3
British Columbia (Skakun)	0	0	2	0	3	1	1	3	X	X	10

Sheet G	1	2	3	4	5	6	7	8	9	10	Final
New Brunswick (Spidell)	0	0	0	1	2	1	1	0	1	2	8
Newfoundland (Rockwell)	1	2	1	0	0	0	0	1	0	0	5

=== Playoffs ===
Semifinal		Final
Ontario	9
Quebec	10	Quebec	2
		Northern Ontario	15

==== Semifinal ====
Sheet G	1	2	3	4	5	6	7	8	9	10	11	Final
Ontario (Kompch)	1	0	1	3	0	3	0	0	0	1	0	9
Quebec (Page)	0	2	0	0	2	0	2	2	1	0	1	10

Player percentages
Ontario		Quebec	
Pat Rumsam	58%	Ghislaine Goulet	66%
Carole Kirschner	51%	Pauline Page	63%
Lucille Scott	47%	Aline Godin	70%
Ellie Kompch	61%	Michele Page	65%
Total	54%	Total	66%

==== Final ====
Sheet E	1	2	3	4	5	6	7	8	9	10	Final
Quebec (Page)	0	0	1	0	1	0	0	0	X	X	2
Northern Ontario (Ross)	4	4	0	1	0	1	4	1	X	X	15

Player percentages
Quebec		Northern Ontario	
Ghislaine Goulet	63%	Rae D'Agostino	75%
Pauline Page	70%	Barbara Gordon	47%
Aline Godin	45%	Linda Anderson	86%
Michele Page	42%	Sheila Ross	78%
Total	55%	Total	71%
