= Ron Braunstein (curler) =

Canadian curler

- Curler
- Born: c. 1940 (age 85–86)

Curling career
- Brier: 2 (1958, 1965)
Medal record
Men's Curling
Representing Manitoba
Macdonald Brier
Gold medal – first place	1965 Saskatoon
Silver medal – second place	1958 Victoria

Ronald E. Braunstein (born c. 1940) is a Canadian retired curler. He played as second on Team Manitoba (skipped by his brother Terry Braunstein) and won the 1965 Brier. Ron was a medical student at the time and had to miss the World championships that year. He was replaced on the team by Gordon McTavish.
