= 1958 Macdonald Brier =

Canadian men's curling championship

- Host city: Victoria, British Columbia
- Arena: Victoria Memorial Arena
- Dates: March 3–7
- Attendance: 36,000
- Winner: Alberta
- Curling club: Granite CC, Edmonton
- Skip: Matt Baldwin
- Third: Jack Geddes
- Second: Gordon Haynes
- Lead: Bill Price
- Finalist: Manitoba

The 1958 Macdonald Brier, the Canadian men's national curling championship, was held from March 3 to 7, 1958 at Victoria Memorial Arena in Victoria, British Columbia. A total of 36,000 fans attended the event.

Both Team Alberta and Team Manitoba finished round robin play tied for first with 8-2 records, necessitating a tiebreaker playoff for the Brier championship between the two teams. Alberta, skipped by Matt Baldwin, won the Brier Tankard for the second year in a row, as they defeated Manitoba 10–6 in the tiebreaker game. This was Alberta's seventh Brier championship and the third time Baldwin had won the Brier as a skip, which tied Ken Watson for the most Brier championships as a skip. In addition, Baldwin joined Gordon Hudson as the only skips to win back-to-back Briers, as Hudson accomplished the feat in 1928 and 1929.

The runner-up Manitoba rink, consisting of curlers who were 18 years old or under, set a couple of Brier records. At 18 years old, skip Terry Braunstein is to date, still youngest curler to ever skip a team at the Brier. At 16 years of age, lead John Van Hellemond (brother of Hockey Hall of Fame referee Andy Van Hellemond) became the youngest curler to ever participate at a Brier. Van Hellemond's record stood until 2022 when 15 year old Nicholas Codner from Team Newfoundland and Labrador subbed in for the final two ends in their match against Alberta. Van Hellemond's participation in the 1958 Brier resulted in a ban of junior curlers at the Brier for nearly 60 years.

== Event Summary ==
Heading into Thursday evening's draw, Alberta and Ontario were tied for first in the standings with a 6–1 record. Manitoba, who had started the Brier by losing two of the first three games had come back and stood one game behind both Alberta and Ontario with a 5–2 record. Both British Columbia and Saskatchewan had an outside chance as they were 4-3 and 5-3 respectively with the loser of their game in the Thursday evening draw being eliminated.

In that Thursday evening draw (Draw 9), Manitoba would defeat and draw even with Ontario with a 13–7 win while Alberta defeated Newfoundland 10–5 to remain in first place. British Columbia eliminated Saskatchewan from Brier contention with a 14–6 win. Heading into the final day of competition, Alberta led with a 7–1 record with Manitoba and Ontario tied with 6-2 records and BC was sitting at 5-3 and needing some help to stay alive.

In the Friday morning draw (Draw 10), Manitoba would keep rolling by beating Nova Scotia 10-7 while British Columbia beat Quebec by an identical 10-7 result that would keep them alive. Alberta would lose to Ontario 10-6 as Alberta skip Matt Baldwin was suffering from the flu and did not perform as well. Thus the final draw would have a lot of drama as there was a high possibility that a tiebreaker would be needed to decide the Brier as Alberta, Manitoba, and Ontario were all 7-2 while BC was sitting at 6-3 and needed a win and losses by all three of the 7-2 teams to be in the tiebreaker.

The final draw on Friday afternoon saw its fair share of excitement. Despite Baldwin being bedridden for the final draw and handing skip duties to Jack Geddes, Alberta would secure at least a tiebreaker berth as Geddes skipped Alberta to a 10–6 victory over Nova Scotia. Manitoba trailed Prince Edward Island 3–2 at the halfway point, but Manitoba would outscore PEI 8–1 in the second half for a 10–4 win, thus forcing a tiebreaker playoff. Ontario could've made it a three-way tiebreaker, but they couldn't recover after a 6–1 deficit after five ends against Northern Ontario and proceeded to lose 9–6, thus Alberta and Manitoba would be the two teams playing for the Brier Tankard in the tiebreaker match that evening.

Baldwin's return in the tiebreaker playoff against Manitoba on Friday evening proved to be a huge difference. Alberta would score three in the first end and would put the game out of reach as they took a 6–1 lead with two in the third and a steal of one in the forth and would go onto defeat Manitoba 10-6 securing Baldwin's place in Brier history.

== Teams ==
The teams are listed as follows:

Alberta	British Columbia	Manitoba	New Brunswick
Granite CC, Edmonton Skip: Matt Baldwin (Note: Team Alberta's third, Jack Geddes threw skip stones in Draw 11 as skip Matt Baldwin fell ill and spent the afternoon in bed while second Gordon Haynes would throw both second and third stones.); Third: Jack Geddes; Second: Gordon Haynes; Lead: Bill Price	Victoria CC, Victoria Skip: Anthony Gutoski; Third: William Dunstan; Second: Gary Leibel; Lead: Dale Dalziel	Granite CC, Winnipeg Skip: Terry Braunstein; Third: Ron Braunstein; Second: Ray Turnbull; Lead: John Van Hellemond	Beaver CC, Moncton Skip: Jimmy Vance; Third: Gordon Clogg; Second: Harry Flemming; Lead: Don Mix
Newfoundland	Northern Ontario	Nova Scotia	Ontario
Blomidon CC, Corner Brook Skip: Alexander Fisher; Third: Wilbert Howell; Second: John Gullage; Lead: William Piercey	Kenora CC, Kenora Skip: Ronald Redding; Third: John Kostick; Second: William Sawkins; Lead: Alan Hansen	Bridgewater CC, Bridgewater Skip: Donald Bauld; Third: Hugh Spencer; Second: Allen Cole; Lead: D'Arcy Sullivan	Unionville CC, Unionville Skip: Murray Roberts; Third: Andy Grant; Second: Ray Grant; Lead: George Rumney
Prince Edward Island	Quebec	Saskatchewan
Charlottetown CC, Charlottetown Skip: Douglas Cameron; Third: George Dillon; Second: James Cameron; Lead: Arnold Llewellyn	C de C du Cap, Cap-de-la-Madeleine Skip: Robert Lahaie; Third: Jean-Louis Lacroix; Second: Yvon Plourde; Lead: Maurice Campbell	Eston CC, Eston Skip: Gordon Grimes; Third: John Sutherland; Second: Sydney Gardiner; Lead: Stuart St. John

== Round-robin standings ==
Key
Teams to Tiebreaker Playoff

Province	Skip	W	L	PF	PA
Alberta	Matt Baldwin	8	2	103	72
Manitoba	Terry Braunstein	8	2	112	73
Ontario	Murray Roberts	7	3	95	84
British Columbia	Anthony Gutoski	6	4	95	82
Saskatchewan	Gordon Grimes	6	4	100	88
Prince Edward Island	Douglas Cameron	5	5	94	88
Northern Ontario	Ronald Redding	4	6	89	95
Newfoundland	Alexander Fisher	4	6	89	97
Quebec	Robert Lahaie	3	7	78	111
Nova Scotia	Donald Bauld	2	8	81	113
New Brunswick	Jimmy Vance	2	8	77	110

== Round-robin results ==
All draw times are listed in Pacific Time (UTC-08:00)

=== Draw 1 ===
Monday, March 3 3:00 PM

Sheet A	1	2	3	4	5	6	7	8	9	10	11	12	Final
New Brunswick (Vance)	0	3	0	2	0	0	0	1	0	0	1	0	7
Newfoundland (Fisher)	3	0	2	0	2	2	3	0	1	1	0	2	16

Sheet B	1	2	3	4	5	6	7	8	9	10	11	12	Final
Quebec (Lahaie)	0	1	0	0	0	1	0	1	0	1	1	0	5
Saskatchewan (Grimes)	2	0	3	1	1	0	2	0	3	0	0	5	17

Sheet C	1	2	3	4	5	6	7	8	9	10	11	12	Final
British Columbia (Gutoski)	1	1	0	2	1	0	1	0	0	0	1	0	7
Ontario (Roberts)	0	0	2	0	0	2	0	1	2	1	0	2	10

Sheet D	1	2	3	4	5	6	7	8	9	10	11	12	Final
Alberta (Baldwin)	3	0	0	1	0	2	3	0	1	0	0	1	11
Prince Edward Island (Cameron)	0	1	0	0	2	0	0	2	0	1	1	0	7

Sheet E	1	2	3	4	5	6	7	8	9	10	11	12	Final
Nova Scotia (Bauld)	2	1	0	1	1	0	2	0	0	1	0	1	9
Northern Ontario (Redding)	0	0	2	0	0	1	0	2	0	0	3	0	8

=== Draw 2 ===
Monday, March 3 8:00 PM

Sheet A	1	2	3	4	5	6	7	8	9	10	11	12	Final
Newfoundland (Fisher)	2	0	0	2	0	1	1	0	1	0	2	0	9
Saskatchewan (Grimes)	0	3	1	0	1	0	0	3	0	1	0	2	11

Sheet B	1	2	3	4	5	6	7	8	9	10	11	12	Final
Nova Scotia (Bauld)	1	0	0	0	1	0	1	1	0	0	0	1	5
British Columbia (Gutoski)	0	1	0	0	0	2	0	0	0	0	3	0	6

Sheet C	1	2	3	4	5	6	7	8	9	10	11	12	Final
Prince Edward Island (Cameron)	0	1	0	1	0	1	0	2	1	0	0	0	6
Northern Ontario (Redding)	1	0	2	0	2	0	3	0	0	2	1	0	11

Sheet D	1	2	3	4	5	6	7	8	9	10	11	12	Final
Alberta (Baldwin)	0	0	1	1	0	3	0	3	0	2	1	2	13
Manitoba (Braunstein)	3	3	0	0	1	0	1	0	3	0	0	0	11

Sheet E	1	2	3	4	5	6	7	8	9	10	11	12	Final
New Brunswick (Vance)	2	1	0	0	1	0	1	0	2	1	0	1	9
Ontario (Roberts)	0	0	2	1	0	3	0	2	0	0	3	0	11

=== Draw 3 ===
Tuesday, March 4 9:30 AM

Sheet A	1	2	3	4	5	6	7	8	9	10	11	12	Final
Northern Ontario (Redding)	2	1	0	0	0	0	0	3	1	0	1	0	8
Manitoba (Braunstein)	0	0	3	1	1	3	3	0	0	1	0	4	16

Sheet B	1	2	3	4	5	6	7	8	9	10	11	12	Final
New Brunswick (Vance)	3	2	0	0	2	0	0	1	0	0	1	0	9
Nova Scotia (Bauld)	0	0	1	2	0	1	1	0	4	2	0	2	13

Sheet C	1	2	3	4	5	6	7	8	9	10	11	12	Final
Saskatchewan (Grimes)	0	0	2	0	2	0	0	1	0	1	1	0	7
Ontario (Roberts)	0	0	0	2	0	1	3	0	3	0	0	1	10

Sheet D	1	2	3	4	5	6	7	8	9	10	11	12	Final
Newfoundland (Fisher)	0	1	1	0	1	0	0	3	0	0	1	2	9
Quebec (Lahaie)	0	0	0	3	0	1	2	0	0	0	0	0	6

Sheet E	1	2	3	4	5	6	7	8	9	10	11	12	Final
Prince Edward Island (Cameron)	0	1	0	1	0	1	0	1	0	0	1	0	5
British Columbia (Gutoski)	0	0	2	0	1	0	2	0	2	1	0	1	9

=== Draw 4 ===
Tuesday, March 4 2:30 PM

Sheet A	1	2	3	4	5	6	7	8	9	10	11	12	Final
Ontario (Roberts)	0	0	1	1	1	1	0	1	0	1	0	0	6
Quebec (Lahaie)	3	1	0	0	0	0	3	0	2	0	1	1	11

Sheet B	1	2	3	4	5	6	7	8	9	10	11	12	Final
Prince Edward Island (Cameron)	1	1	0	1	0	0	4	0	0	2	1	0	10
New Brunswick (Vance)	0	0	1	0	1	0	0	1	1	0	0	3	7

Sheet C	1	2	3	4	5	6	7	8	9	10	11	12	13	Final
Manitoba (Braunstein)	0	1	0	0	2	0	1	0	3	1	0	1	0	9
British Columbia (Gutoski)	1	0	1	2	0	2	0	1	0	0	2	0	1	10

Sheet D	1	2	3	4	5	6	7	8	9	10	11	12	Final
Northern Ontario (Redding)	0	1	2	0	1	0	0	0	0	2	0	1	7
Alberta (Baldwin)	1	0	0	1	0	2	0	2	1	0	2	0	9

Sheet E	1	2	3	4	5	6	7	8	9	10	11	12	Final
Saskatchewan (Grimes)	0	0	1	0	4	1	2	0	1	0	3	X	12
Nova Scotia (Bauld)	1	1	0	1	0	0	0	1	0	2	0	X	6

=== Draw 5 ===
Wednesday, March 5 3:00 PM

Sheet A	1	2	3	4	5	6	7	8	9	10	11	12	Final
Ontario (Roberts)	3	0	1	0	1	0	1	1	0	3	1	0	11
Newfoundland (Fisher)	0	1	0	1	0	2	0	0	1	0	0	1	6

Sheet B	1	2	3	4	5	6	7	8	9	10	11	12	Final
Quebec (Lahaie)	2	0	3	0	2	1	3	0	2	0	1	0	14
Nova Scotia (Bauld)	0	2	0	1	0	0	0	3	0	1	0	3	10

Sheet C	1	2	3	4	5	6	7	8	9	10	11	12	Final
Manitoba (Braunstein)	0	1	0	0	1	0	1	0	1	2	1	1	8
New Brunswick (Vance)	1	0	2	2	0	0	0	1	0	0	0	0	6

Sheet D	1	2	3	4	5	6	7	8	9	10	11	12	Final
British Columbia (Gutoski)	0	1	0	3	0	1	1	0	1	0	0	1	8
Alberta (Baldwin)	3	0	1	0	2	0	0	2	0	1	3	0	12

Sheet E	1	2	3	4	5	6	7	8	9	10	11	12	13	Final
Saskatchewan (Grimes)	0	0	1	1	1	0	2	0	1	0	2	1	0	9
Prince Edward Island (Cameron)	1	3	0	0	0	2	0	1	0	2	0	0	2	11

=== Draw 6 ===
Wednesday, March 5 8:00 PM

Sheet A	1	2	3	4	5	6	7	8	9	10	11	12	Final
Nova Scotia (Bauld)	2	1	1	1	1	2	0	0	1	0	1	0	10
Newfoundland (Fisher)	0	0	0	0	0	0	4	3	0	2	0	3	12

Sheet B	1	2	3	4	5	6	7	8	9	10	11	12	Final
Alberta (Baldwin)	2	1	0	1	1	1	1	1	3	0	1	0	12
New Brunswick (Vance)	0	0	1	0	0	0	0	0	0	1	0	2	4

Sheet C	1	2	3	4	5	6	7	8	9	10	11	12	Final
British Columbia (Gutoski)	1	0	1	0	0	1	0	0	1	0	0	5	9
Northern Ontario (Redding)	0	1	0	1	3	0	2	1	0	2	4	0	14

Sheet D	1	2	3	4	5	6	7	8	9	10	11	12	Final
Quebec (Lahaie)	0	0	1	2	0	1	0	1	1	0	0	1	7
Prince Edward Island (Cameron)	2	1	0	0	4	0	3	0	0	2	4	0	16

Sheet E	1	2	3	4	5	6	7	8	9	10	11	12	Final
Manitoba (Braunstein)	1	1	0	2	1	0	1	0	1	1	1	1	10
Saskatchewan (Grimes)	0	0	1	0	0	2	0	1	0	0	0	0	4

=== Draw 7 ===
Thursday, March 6 9:00 AM

Sheet A	1	2	3	4	5	6	7	8	9	10	11	12	Final
New Brunswick (Vance)	0	0	3	0	2	0	1	0	1	0	1	2	10
Northern Ontario (Redding)	1	1	0	1	0	1	0	1	0	1	0	0	6

Sheet B	1	2	3	4	5	6	7	8	9	10	11	12	Final
Quebec (Lahaie)	0	0	3	0	1	0	0	1	2	0	1	0	8
Manitoba (Braunstein)	2	2	0	1	0	2	1	0	0	1	0	1	10

Sheet C	1	2	3	4	5	6	7	8	9	10	11	12	13	Final
Newfoundland (Fisher)	1	0	1	0	0	1	0	5	0	1	0	1	0	10
Prince Edward Island (Cameron)	0	1	0	1	1	0	2	0	3	0	2	0	2	12

Sheet D	1	2	3	4	5	6	7	8	9	10	11	12	Final
Ontario (Roberts)	2	0	2	0	0	4	0	1	2	0	0	4	15
Nova Scotia (Bauld)	0	2	0	1	3	0	1	0	0	2	1	0	10

Sheet E	1	2	3	4	5	6	7	8	9	10	11	12	Final
Alberta (Baldwin)	1	0	2	2	0	1	0	1	0	0	1	0	8
Saskatchewan (Grimes)	0	1	0	0	3	0	2	0	1	2	0	1	10

=== Draw 8 ===
Thursday, March 6 3:00 PM

Sheet A	1	2	3	4	5	6	7	8	9	10	11	12	Final
Prince Edward Island (Cameron)	0	2	0	0	0	1	0	0	1	0	2	0	6
Ontario (Roberts)	1	0	0	1	0	0	2	1	0	1	0	3	9

Sheet B	1	2	3	4	5	6	7	8	9	10	11	12	Final
Alberta (Baldwin)	0	2	0	1	2	1	1	1	0	0	3	1	12
Quebec (Lahaie)	1	0	1	0	0	0	0	0	1	1	0	0	4

Sheet C	1	2	3	4	5	6	7	8	9	10	11	12	Final
Northern Ontario (Redding)	0	0	0	0	2	0	0	2	2	0	0	3	9
Saskatchewan (Grimes)	1	1	1	2	0	1	2	0	0	4	1	0	13

Sheet D	1	2	3	4	5	6	7	8	9	10	11	12	Final
New Brunswick (Vance)	0	0	0	3	0	0	1	0	1	0	1	0	6
British Columbia (Gutoski)	1	2	2	0	4	2	0	1	0	3	0	1	16

Sheet E	1	2	3	4	5	6	7	8	9	10	11	12	Final
Newfoundland (Fisher)	2	0	1	0	0	1	0	0	0	1	0	1	6
Manitoba (Braunstein)	0	4	0	2	1	0	2	1	1	0	4	0	15

=== Draw 9 ===
Thursday, March 6 8:00 PM

Sheet A	1	2	3	4	5	6	7	8	9	10	11	12	Final
Saskatchewan (Grimes)	1	1	0	0	0	1	0	0	0	1	0	2	6
British Columbia (Gutoski)	0	0	2	1	1	0	3	1	2	0	4	0	14

Sheet B	1	2	3	4	5	6	7	8	9	10	11	12	Final
Newfoundland (Fisher)	0	0	1	0	0	0	1	0	1	0	0	2	5
Alberta (Baldwin)	1	1	0	1	1	0	0	3	0	3	0	0	10

Sheet C	1	2	3	4	5	6	7	8	9	10	11	12	Final
Ontario (Roberts)	0	0	1	1	0	2	0	0	0	1	0	2	7
Manitoba (Braunstein)	0	4	0	0	2	0	1	2	2	0	2	0	13

Sheet D	1	2	3	4	5	6	7	8	9	10	11	12	Final
Prince Edward Island (Cameron)	3	0	2	0	4	2	1	1	2	1	0	1	17
Nova Scotia (Bauld)	0	1	0	2	0	0	0	0	0	0	2	0	5

Sheet E	1	2	3	4	5	6	7	8	9	10	11	12	Final
Northern Ontario (Redding)	3	1	0	0	0	0	0	1	0	0	0	3	8
Quebec (Lahaie)	0	0	0	1	1	1	2	0	0	1	3	0	9

=== Draw 10 ===
Friday, March 7 9:30 AM

Sheet A	1	2	3	4	5	6	7	8	9	10	11	12	Final
Quebec (Lahaie)	1	1	0	3	0	0	1	0	0	0	1	0	7
British Columbia (Gutoski)	0	0	1	0	1	1	0	2	2	1	0	2	10

Sheet B	1	2	3	4	5	6	7	8	9	10	11	12	Final
Newfoundland (Fisher)	0	0	2	0	0	2	1	0	0	0	3	0	8
Northern Ontario (Redding)	2	1	0	1	0	0	0	2	1	1	0	1	9

Sheet C	1	2	3	4	5	6	7	8	9	10	11	12	Final
Alberta (Baldwin)	0	1	0	0	0	1	0	1	0	0	1	2	6
Ontario (Roberts)	2	0	0	2	1	0	1	0	2	2	0	0	10

Sheet D	1	2	3	4	5	6	7	8	9	10	11	12	Final
Nova Scotia (Bauld)	1	0	0	0	1	1	0	2	0	0	2	0	7
Manitoba (Braunstein)	0	1	2	1	0	0	1	0	2	2	0	1	10

Sheet E	1	2	3	4	5	6	7	8	9	10	11	12	Final
New Brunswick (Vance)	2	0	1	0	0	0	1	0	0	1	1	0	6
Saskatchewan (Grimes)	0	1	0	1	2	1	0	2	3	0	0	1	11

=== Draw 11 ===
Friday, March 7 3:00 PM

Sheet A	1	2	3	4	5	6	7	8	9	10	11	12	Final
Quebec (Lahaie)	1	1	0	0	1	1	0	0	0	1	0	2	7
New Brunswick (Vance)	0	0	2	2	0	0	2	4	1	0	2	0	13

Sheet B	1	2	3	4	5	6	7	8	9	10	11	12	Final
Ontario (Roberts)	0	1	0	0	0	1	0	1	0	1	0	2	6
Northern Ontario (Redding)	0	0	3	1	2	0	1	0	1	0	1	0	9

Sheet C	1	2	3	4	5	6	7	8	9	10	11	12	Final
Nova Scotia (Bauld)	1	0	0	0	1	0	1	0	0	2	0	1	6
Alberta (Baldwin)	0	3	1	1	0	1	0	1	1	0	2	0	10

Sheet D	1	2	3	4	5	6	7	8	9	10	11	12	Final
Manitoba (Braunstein)	0	0	1	0	1	0	1	2	1	0	3	1	10
Prince Edward Island (Cameron)	0	1	0	1	0	1	0	0	0	1	0	0	4

Sheet E	1	2	3	4	5	6	7	8	9	10	11	12	Final
British Columbia (Gutoski)	1	0	0	1	1	0	1	0	1	0	1	0	6
Newfoundland (Fisher)	0	0	2	0	0	1	0	1	0	3	0	1	8

== Playoff ==
Friday, March 7

Sheet C	1	2	3	4	5	6	7	8	9	10	11	12	Final
Alberta (Baldwin)	3	0	2	1	0	0	0	0	2	1	0	1	10
Manitoba (Braunstein)	0	1	0	0	1	0	1	1	0	0	2	0	6

Player percentages
Alberta		Manitoba	
Bill Price	90%	John Van Hellemond	57%
Gordon Haynes	66%	Ray Turnbull	73%
Jack Geddes	77%	Ron Braunstein	57%
Matt Baldwin	69%	Terry Braunstein	48%
Total	75%	Total	59%

Shot percentages were calculated based on the points scored via the source provided.
