= 1965 Macdonald Brier =

Canadian men's curling championship

- Host city: Saskatoon, Saskatchewan
- Arena: Saskatoon Arena
- Dates: March 1–5
- Attendance: 52,319
- Winner: Manitoba
- Curling club: Granite CC, Winnipeg
- Skip: Terry Braunstein
- Third: Don Duguid
- Second: Ron Braunstein
- Lead: Ray Turnbull

The 1965 Macdonald Brier, the Canadian men's national curling championship, was held from March 1 to 5, 1965 at Saskatoon Arena in Saskatoon, Saskatchewan. After the Brier the year before drew the smallest crowd since 1952, the 1965 Brier broke the attendance record at the time as a total of 52,319 fans attended the Brier. This attendance record would not be surpassed until 1970.

Team Manitoba, skipped by Terry Braunstein, captured the Brier Tankard by finishing round robin play with a 9–1 record. This was Manitoba's first Brier championship since 1956, and their sixteenth Brier championship overall. Braunstein's rink would go on to represent Canada in the 1965 Scotch Cup in which they became the first Canadian team to not win gold, as they were upset by the United States in the gold medal game.

Draw 9 between Alberta and Quebec saw the largest come from behind victory in Brier history. Alberta trailed 9-0 after the fifth end but Alberta outscored Quebec 16-3 in the last seven ends to win the game 16-12.

Draw 9 also saw two separate games go into a second extra end (14 ends) as Nova Scotia beat Newfoundland 11-9 and Ontario defeating New Brunswick 11-10. This was only the second and third time in Brier history that a second extra end would occur. The only other time this occurred was in 1955, which also featured Ontario and New Brunswick.

== Event Summary ==
Heading into the Thursday evening draw, Manitoba lead the competition with an unbeaten record of 7-0 while Saskatchewan, heading into their bye was 7-1. Northern Ontario and Quebec were both 5-2 and Alberta was 5-3. In the Thursday evening draw, Northern Ontario handed Manitoba their first loss of the competition with a 12-6 victory while Quebec blew a 9-0 lead after five ends and lost to Alberta 16-12. Heading into the final day, both Manitoba and Saskatchewan were tied with 7-1 records with Northern Ontario one game behind with a 6-2 record with Alberta and Quebec still having an outside shot with 6-3 and 5-3 records respectively.

The Friday morning draw saw a major upset as Saskatchewan lost to a two-win Nova Scotia team 7-6 in which Saskatchewan lead 6-4 with two ends remaining. Northern Ontario stayed alive as they beat Quebec 8-6 while Manitoba took complete advantage of Nova Scotia's upset win and cruised to a 13-7 victory over Ontario to retake the Brier lead and be in the drivers seat heading into the final draw.

Heading into the final draw, both Northern Ontario and Saskatchewan would need to win and have Manitoba lose to force a tiebreaker against Manitoba. Northern Ontario would lead Alberta 8-5 heading into the tenth end, but Alberta would stage another come from behind win as they tied the game with three in the tenth. After the eleventh end was blanked, Alberta would seal Northern Ontario's fate with a steal of one in the final end for a 9-8 win. Saskatchewan would keep their hopes alive as they cruised past Prince Edward Island 11-8. However, Manitoba would clinch the Brier Tankard with a 10-7 win over British Columbia. BC kept it close until the eighth end when Manitoba would score five to take the lead for good.

== Teams ==
The teams are listed as follows:

Alberta	British Columbia	Manitoba	New Brunswick
Calgary CC, Calgary Skip: Nicholas Lashuk; Third: Roland Otterson; Second: Ken Hamilton; Lead: Donald Jarrett	Thunderbird CC, Vancouver Skip: John Arnett; Third: Terrance Miller; Second: Glen Walker; Lead: Soren Jensen	Granite CC, Winnipeg Skip: Terry Braunstein; Third: Don Duguid; Second: Ron Braunstein; Lead: Ray Turnbull	Beausejour CC, Moncton Skip: Peter Lyons; Third: Kenneth Little; Second: Raymond Gould; Lead: Joseph Carey
Newfoundland	Northern Ontario	Nova Scotia	Ontario
St. John's CC, St. John's Skip: George MacCharles; Third: John Taite; Second: Kenneth Ellis; Lead: Alexander Andrews	Kirkland Lake CC, Kirkland Lake Skip: Jack Polyblank; Third: Frank Buturac; Second: Earl MacInnes; Lead: Wayne Petch	Mayflower CC, Halifax Skip: Ronald Franklin; Third: Peter Corkum; Second: John Hawkins; Lead: John Oyler	Unionville CC, Unionville Skip: Ray Grant; Third: Keith Jewett; Second: Raymond McGee; Lead: Alfred Claney
Prince Edward Island	Quebec	Saskatchewan
Charlottetown CC, Charlottetown Skip: Douglas Cameron; Third: Alan Smith; Second: George Dillon; Lead: Bob Dillon	RCAF Bagotville CC, Bagotville Skip: Bill Tracy; Third: Douglas Stuart; Second: Earl Carlson; Lead: Edgar Wood	Delisle CC, Delisle Skip: Harold Worth Jr. Third: Elmer MacNevin; Second: Murray Armstrong; Lead: Gary Stevenson

== Map of teams ==
Provincial Winners

== Round-robin standings ==
Key
Brier champion

Province	Skip	W	L	PF	PA
Manitoba	Terry Braunstein	9	1	99	68
Saskatchewan	Harold Worth Jr.	8	2	98	69
Alberta	Nicholas Lashuk	7	3	98	87
Northern Ontario	Jack Polyblank	7	3	85	78
Ontario	Ray Grant	5	5	88	85
Quebec	Bill Tracy	5	5	90	94
Prince Edward Island	Douglas Cameron	4	6	86	86
British Columbia	John Arnett	3	7	75	91
Nova Scotia	Ronald Franklin	3	7	76	98
Newfoundland	George MacCharles	2	8	81	100
New Brunswick	Peter Lyons	2	8	82	102

== Round-robin results ==
All draw times are listed in Central Time (UTC-06:00)

=== Draw 1 ===
Monday, March 1 3:00 PM

Sheet A	1	2	3	4	5	6	7	8	9	10	11	12	Final
Alberta (Lashuk)	0	0	1	0	0	1	0	1	0	0	2	0	5
Ontario (Grant)	0	4	0	1	0	0	3	0	0	2	0	1	11

Sheet B	1	2	3	4	5	6	7	8	9	10	11	12	Final
Manitoba (Braunstein)	2	0	0	1	0	2	0	3	1	0	1	0	10
Newfoundland (MacCharles)	0	3	0	0	1	0	1	0	0	1	0	1	7

Sheet C	1	2	3	4	5	6	7	8	9	10	11	12	Final
New Brunswick (Lyons)	0	1	0	1	0	1	0	0	0	2	0	1	6
Saskatchewan (Worth)	3	0	1	0	1	0	1	1	1	0	4	0	12

Sheet D	1	2	3	4	5	6	7	8	9	10	11	12	Final
Nova Scotia (Franklin)	0	0	0	2	0	0	1	0	0	1	0	0	4
Prince Edward Island (Cameron)	0	1	0	0	1	1	0	3	4	0	5	1	16

Sheet E	1	2	3	4	5	6	7	8	9	10	11	12	13	Final
British Columbia (Arnett)	0	0	1	1	0	2	0	0	2	0	0	3	0	9
Quebec (Tracy)	1	3	0	0	1	0	1	1	0	1	1	0	1	10

=== Draw 2 ===
Monday, March 1 8:00 PM

Sheet A	1	2	3	4	5	6	7	8	9	10	11	12	Final
British Columbia (Arnett)	0	0	0	1	0	1	0	0	1	0	0	2	5
Alberta (Lashuk)	1	1	3	0	2	0	2	1	0	0	0	0	10

Sheet B	1	2	3	4	5	6	7	8	9	10	11	12	Final
Nova Scotia (Franklin)	1	0	0	1	0	2	0	0	2	0	2	0	8
New Brunswick (Lyons)	0	2	2	0	2	0	0	2	0	1	0	2	11

Sheet C	1	2	3	4	5	6	7	8	9	10	11	12	Final
Newfoundland (MacCharles)	0	1	0	2	0	0	2	0	2	0	0	0	7
Quebec (Tracy)	2	0	1	0	2	0	0	1	0	1	2	1	10

Sheet D	1	2	3	4	5	6	7	8	9	10	11	12	Final
Manitoba (Braunstein)	1	0	1	0	0	2	0	0	4	0	0	3	11
Saskatchewan (Worth)	0	1	0	1	0	0	0	1	0	2	0	0	5

Sheet E	1	2	3	4	5	6	7	8	9	10	11	12	Final
Northern Ontario (Polyblank)	1	1	0	2	1	0	1	0	0	2	0	0	8
Ontario (Grant)	0	0	1	0	0	1	0	1	1	0	2	1	7

=== Draw 3 ===
Tuesday, March 2 9:30 AM

Sheet A	1	2	3	4	5	6	7	8	9	10	11	12	Final
British Columbia (Arnett)	1	0	1	0	1	0	2	0	0	0	2	1	8
Northern Ontario (Polyblank)	0	2	0	2	0	2	0	1	2	0	0	0	9

Sheet B	1	2	3	4	5	6	7	8	9	10	11	12	Final
Nova Scotia (Franklin)	1	0	1	0	0	1	0	0	1	0	0	1	5
Manitoba (Braunstein)	0	1	0	1	0	0	0	2	0	3	1	0	8

Sheet C	1	2	3	4	5	6	7	8	9	10	11	12	Final
Alberta (Lashuk)	1	0	2	0	1	1	0	1	0	3	0	1	10
Newfoundland (MacCharles)	0	2	0	1	0	0	1	0	2	0	1	0	7

Sheet D	1	2	3	4	5	6	7	8	9	10	11	12	Final
New Brunswick (Lyons)	0	1	0	2	0	0	1	1	0	0	0	2	7
Prince Edward Island (Cameron)	2	0	1	0	2	2	0	0	0	1	2	0	10

Sheet E	1	2	3	4	5	6	7	8	9	10	11	12	Final
Saskatchewan (Worth)	0	4	0	0	3	0	1	0	1	0	2	1	12
Quebec (Tracy)	3	0	0	1	0	2	0	1	0	1	0	0	8

=== Draw 4 ===
Tuesday, March 2 3:00 PM

Sheet A	1	2	3	4	5	6	7	8	9	10	11	12	13	Final
Quebec (Tracy)	0	1	2	0	1	0	3	0	0	1	0	1	1	10
Nova Scotia (Franklin)	3	0	0	2	0	1	0	2	0	0	1	0	0	9

Sheet B	1	2	3	4	5	6	7	8	9	10	11	12	Final
Prince Edward Island (Cameron)	0	1	0	1	0	1	0	1	0	1	0	1	6
Manitoba (Braunstein)	1	0	4	0	2	0	2	0	1	0	2	0	12

Sheet C	1	2	3	4	5	6	7	8	9	10	11	12	Final
Saskatchewan (Worth)	0	0	0	2	3	0	0	1	0	1	0	1	8
Alberta (Lashuk)	0	0	1	0	0	1	1	0	2	0	1	0	6

Sheet D	1	2	3	4	5	6	7	8	9	10	11	12	Final
Newfoundland (MacCharles)	0	0	1	0	0	0	0	0	0	1	0	2	4
Northern Ontario (Polyblank)	1	1	0	1	0	0	1	0	2	0	3	0	9

Sheet E	1	2	3	4	5	6	7	8	9	10	11	12	Final
Ontario (Grant)	0	0	1	0	0	1	0	0	1	2	0	1	6
British Columbia (Arnett)	0	1	0	2	1	0	0	1	0	0	3	0	8

=== Draw 5 ===
Wednesday, March 3 3:00 PM

Sheet A	1	2	3	4	5	6	7	8	9	10	11	12	Final
Ontario (Grant)	0	3	0	1	1	0	0	2	0	0	2	0	9
Newfoundland (MacCharles)	3	0	1	0	0	2	1	0	0	1	0	0	8

Sheet B	1	2	3	4	5	6	7	8	9	10	11	12	Final
Alberta (Lashuk)	0	1	0	1	0	1	0	2	0	2	2	0	9
Nova Scotia (Franklin)	1	0	1	0	2	0	2	0	1	0	0	1	8

Sheet C	1	2	3	4	5	6	7	8	9	10	11	12	Final
Quebec (Tracy)	2	0	2	0	0	0	1	1	1	0	1	2	10
Prince Edward Island (Cameron)	0	2	0	1	1	1	0	0	0	1	0	0	6

Sheet D	1	2	3	4	5	6	7	8	9	10	11	12	Final
New Brunswick (Lyons)	2	0	1	0	1	0	1	0	1	0	0	1	7
Manitoba (Braunstein)	0	5	0	1	0	1	0	1	0	1	1	0	10

Sheet E	1	2	3	4	5	6	7	8	9	10	11	12	Final
Saskatchewan (Worth)	2	0	0	0	0	0	1	0	5	0	0	4	12
Northern Ontario (Polyblank)	0	1	0	1	0	1	0	1	0	1	1	0	6

=== Draw 6 ===
Wednesday, March 3 8:00 PM

Sheet A	1	2	3	4	5	6	7	8	9	10	11	12	Final
Nova Scotia (Franklin)	0	0	0	3	0	1	0	2	0	0	0	2	8
Northern Ontario (Polyblank)	1	2	2	0	1	0	3	0	1	1	0	0	11

Sheet B	1	2	3	4	5	6	7	8	9	10	11	12	Final
Saskatchewan (Worth)	1	2	0	1	1	1	2	0	2	0	1	0	11
Ontario (Grant)	0	0	1	0	0	0	0	0	0	1	0	1	3

Sheet C	1	2	3	4	5	6	7	8	9	10	11	12	Final
British Columbia (Arnett)	0	0	2	0	1	0	0	3	1	0	2	0	9
Newfoundland (MacCharles)	0	3	0	3	0	3	3	0	0	2	0	2	16

Sheet D	1	2	3	4	5	6	7	8	9	10	11	12	Final
Alberta (Lashuk)	0	0	2	1	0	5	0	2	0	1	2	0	13
Prince Edward Island (Cameron)	2	1	0	0	2	0	1	0	1	0	0	2	9

Sheet E	1	2	3	4	5	6	7	8	9	10	11	12	Final
New Brunswick (Lyons)	0	1	0	0	0	2	0	0	1	0	1	2	7
Quebec (Tracy)	1	0	1	1	0	0	3	4	0	2	0	0	12

=== Draw 7 ===
Thursday, March 4 9:30 AM

Sheet A	1	2	3	4	5	6	7	8	9	10	11	12	Final
British Columbia (Arnett)	0	1	0	1	0	0	0	2	0	1	0	1	6
Saskatchewan (Worth)	2	0	1	0	1	1	0	0	0	0	2	0	7

Sheet B	1	2	3	4	5	6	7	8	9	10	11	12	Final
Northern Ontario (Polyblank)	0	1	0	0	0	0	1	0	0	3	0	0	5
Prince Edward Island (Cameron)	2	0	2	0	0	3	0	1	0	0	2	2	12

Sheet C	1	2	3	4	5	6	7	8	9	10	11	12	Final
Alberta (Lashuk)	0	1	0	3	0	1	2	0	2	0	4	0	13
New Brunswick (Lyons)	0	0	1	0	1	0	0	2	0	1	0	2	7

Sheet D	1	2	3	4	5	6	7	8	9	10	11	12	Final
Nova Scotia (Franklin)	2	0	4	1	0	0	0	1	1	0	2	0	11
Ontario (Grant)	0	3	0	0	1	1	1	0	0	2	0	2	10

Sheet E	1	2	3	4	5	6	7	8	9	10	11	12	Final
Manitoba (Braunstein)	1	1	0	1	0	0	2	0	0	1	1	0	7
Quebec (Tracy)	0	0	1	0	1	0	0	1	1	0	0	1	5

=== Draw 8 ===
Thursday, March 4 3:00 PM

Sheet A	1	2	3	4	5	6	7	8	9	10	11	12	Final
Manitoba (Braunstein)	0	2	1	0	2	0	3	0	0	0	2	2	12
Alberta (Lashuk)	2	0	0	1	0	1	0	1	1	1	0	0	7

Sheet B	1	2	3	4	5	6	7	8	9	10	11	12	Final
Prince Edward Island (Cameron)	0	0	1	0	0	0	3	0	0	0	0	0	4
Ontario (Grant)	2	0	0	1	2	3	0	1	0	1	0	1	11

Sheet C	1	2	3	4	5	6	7	8	9	10	11	12	Final
Nova Scotia (Franklin)	0	1	0	1	0	1	0	0	1	0	1	0	5
British Columbia (Arnett)	1	0	3	0	1	0	0	0	0	1	0	2	8

Sheet D	1	2	3	4	5	6	7	8	9	10	11	12	Final
Newfoundland (MacCharles)	0	0	0	3	0	0	2	2	0	1	0	0	8
Saskatchewan (Worth)	2	1	5	0	1	1	0	0	2	0	1	1	14

Sheet E	1	2	3	4	5	6	7	8	9	10	11	12	Final
Northern Ontario (Polyblank)	1	0	2	0	2	0	2	0	0	1	1	0	9
New Brunswick (Lyons)	0	1	0	1	0	2	0	1	0	0	0	1	6

=== Draw 9 ===
Thursday, March 4 8:00 PM

Sheet A	1	2	3	4	5	6	7	8	9	10	11	12	13	14	Final
Newfoundland (MacCharles)	2	0	1	0	0	3	0	1	0	0	0	2	0	0	9
Nova Scotia (Franklin)	0	2	0	1	1	0	1	0	2	0	2	0	0	2	11

Sheet B	1	2	3	4	5	6	7	8	9	10	11	12	13	14	Final
Ontario (Grant)	0	1	1	0	1	0	2	0	3	0	2	0	0	1	11
New Brunswick (Lyons)	2	0	0	1	0	1	0	2	0	2	0	2	0	0	10

Sheet C	1	2	3	4	5	6	7	8	9	10	11	12	Final
Northern Ontario (Polyblank)	1	1	0	1	0	3	0	2	1	3	0	0	12
Manitoba (Braunstein)	0	0	1	0	1	0	3	0	0	0	0	1	6

Sheet D	1	2	3	4	5	6	7	8	9	10	11	12	Final
Quebec (Tracy)	1	2	1	4	1	0	0	2	0	0	1	0	12
Alberta (Lashuk)	0	0	0	0	0	3	2	0	5	1	0	5	16

Sheet E	1	2	3	4	5	6	7	8	9	10	11	12	Final
Prince Edward Island (Cameron)	0	1	0	1	0	1	0	0	0	1	0	1	5
British Columbia (Arnett)	1	0	1	0	2	0	0	1	0	0	2	0	7

=== Draw 10 ===
Friday, March 5 9:30 AM

Sheet A	1	2	3	4	5	6	7	8	9	10	11	12	Final
Quebec (Tracy)	0	1	0	1	0	2	0	0	0	2	0	0	6
Northern Ontario (Polyblank)	1	0	1	0	2	0	0	1	0	0	2	1	8

Sheet B	1	2	3	4	5	6	7	8	9	10	11	12	Final
New Brunswick (Lyons)	1	1	1	0	3	2	0	0	2	0	1	2	13
British Columbia (Arnett)	0	0	0	1	0	0	5	1	0	1	0	0	8

Sheet C	1	2	3	4	5	6	7	8	9	10	11	12	Final
Prince Edward Island (Cameron)	0	0	2	2	0	2	1	0	1	0	1	1	10
Newfoundland (MacCharles)	1	3	0	0	0	0	0	1	0	1	0	0	6

Sheet D	1	2	3	4	5	6	7	8	9	10	11	12	Final
Saskatchewan (Worth)	0	0	0	3	0	0	1	0	0	2	0	0	6
Nova Scotia (Franklin)	0	0	2	0	0	1	0	0	1	0	2	1	7

Sheet E	1	2	3	4	5	6	7	8	9	10	11	12	Final
Ontario (Grant)	1	0	2	0	1	0	1	0	1	0	1	0	7
Manitoba (Braunstein)	0	5	0	2	0	1	0	1	0	2	0	2	13

=== Draw 11 ===
Friday, March 5 3:00 PM

Sheet A	1	2	3	4	5	6	7	8	9	10	11	12	Final
British Columbia (Arnett)	1	1	0	1	0	0	1	0	0	2	0	1	7
Manitoba (Braunstein)	0	0	1	0	1	1	0	5	1	0	1	0	10

Sheet B	1	2	3	4	5	6	7	8	9	10	11	12	Final
Saskatchewan (Worth)	2	2	2	0	1	0	0	1	0	3	0	0	11
Prince Edward Island (Cameron)	0	0	0	2	0	1	1	0	1	0	1	2	8

Sheet C	1	2	3	4	5	6	7	8	9	10	11	12	Final
Ontario (Grant)	1	0	2	0	0	0	5	1	0	3	0	1	13
Quebec (Tracy)	0	1	0	2	0	1	0	0	2	0	1	0	7

Sheet D	1	2	3	4	5	6	7	8	9	10	11	12	Final
Alberta (Lashuk)	0	2	0	1	0	0	2	0	0	3	0	1	9
Northern Ontario (Polyblank)	1	0	1	0	2	1	0	2	1	0	0	0	8

Sheet E	1	2	3	4	5	6	7	8	9	10	11	12	13	Final
New Brunswick (Lyons)	0	0	1	3	1	0	0	0	0	1	1	1	0	8
Newfoundland (MacCharles)	2	1	0	0	0	1	1	2	1	0	0	0	1	9

== Awards ==
For the first time ever, an All-Star team was selected by the media.

All-Star Team
Position	Name	Team
Skip	Jack Polyblank	Northern Ontario
Third	Don Duguid	Manitoba
Second	Ken Hamilton	Alberta
Lead	Ray Turnbull	Manitoba
