= Canadian Curling Hall of Fame =

Hall of fame in Orleans, Ontario

The Canadian Curling Hall of Fame was established with its first inductees in 1973. It is operated by Curling Canada, the governing body for curling in Canada, in Orleans, Ontario.

The Hall of Fame selection committee meets annually to choose inductees from four categories: curler, builder, curler/builder and team. Past presidents of the Curling Canada are automatically inducted into the Hall of Fame as part of the Executive Honour Roll.

== Members ==
=== A-F ===
- Diane Adams
- Don Aitken
- J. W. Allan
- Lorraine Ambrosio
- A. F. Anderson
- Sherry Anderson (2024)
- A. F. Angus
- Ron Anton
- Horace F. Argue
- James Armstrong
- Jim Armstrong
- Janet Arnott
- Mary-Anne Arsenault
- Laurie Artiss
- Henri Auger
- Frank Avery
- Hugh Avery
- Norm Balderston
- Matt Baldwin
- Caroline Ball
- Marilyn Barraclough
- Sue Ann Bartlett
- David Beesley
- Terry Begin
- Tim Belcourt
- Gordon Bennett
- Morag Bergasse
- Jan Betker
- Marilyn Bodogh
- Henry Bruce Boreham
- Earl Bourne
- Jack Boutilier
- Jack Bowman
- Bert Boyd
- Cec Boyd
- Earl Boyd
- Ralph Boyd
- Shirley Bray
- Brier Bear (Reg Coughie)
- Fred Britton
- Michael Burns Sr.
- Noel Buxton
- Ada Calles
- Bert Cameron
- Doug Cameron
- George Cameron
- Colin Campbell
- Garnet Campbell
- Glen Campbell
- Gloria Campbell
- Gordon Campbell
- Maurice Campbell
- Thane Campbell
- Kent Carstairs
- Harry Carter
- Brian Cassidy
- Agnès Charette
- Pierre Charette
- Kathleen Clift
- James Congalton
- George Cooke
- Edith Corby-Moore
- Resby Coutts
- Walter B. Cowan
- Pauline M. Cragg
- Gordon Craig
- Robert Cream
- Elsie Crosby
- Edward M. "Ted" Culliton
- D. William "Bill" Currie
- Lyall Dagg
- Keith Deacon
- Nancy Delahunt
- Noreen Delisle
- Al R. Delmage
- Mabel M. DeWare
- Catherine Dillon
- George V. Dillon
- Robert F. Dillon
- Marion Dockendroff
- James E. Donahoe
- Richard A. Donahoe
- Donna Duffett
- Donald G. "Don" Duguid
- Anne Dunn
- John Dutton
- Patricia "Trish" Dwyer
- Jessie Elliott
- Irl England
- Millard Evans
- Emily Farnham
- Sylvia Fedoruk
- Randy Ferbey
- John W. "Fergie" Ferguson
- André Ferland
- Thomas R. Fisher
- Don Fleming
- Richard D. "Rick" Folk
- Anita Ford
- Atina Ford
- Ina Forrest
- Al Forsythe
- H. C. "Ren" Fortier
- Barbara Foster
- Gordon G. "Gordie" Fox

=== G-L ===
- William Gatchell
- Sonja Gaudet
- Cathy Gauthier
- Regi Geary
- Maymar Gemmell
- Hector J. Gervais
- Brenda Goertzen (2024)
- Bill Good Sr.
- Edwin Gooder
- Peter Gow
- Albert "Ab" Gowanlock
- William A. Grant
- Thomas Gray
- Barry Greenberg
- Jill Greenwood
- Marcia Gudereit
- John Gunn
- Lloyd H. Gunnlaugson
- Joseph A. Gurowka
- Al Hackner
- John Haig
- Perry Hall
- Ina Hansen
- Warren Hansen
- Scotty Harper
- Bill Harris
- Dawn Harris (Knowles)
- Les Harrison
- Neil Harrison
- Ross Harstone
- Gordon J. Haynes
- Bob Heartwell
- Ann Hebb
- Leo Hebert
- Patty Hersikorn (2024)
- Darlene Hill
- Walter Hobbs
- Gordon Hooey
- Heather E. Houston
- Neil W. "Woody" Houston
- Glenn W. "Howie" Howard
- Russell W. "Russ" Howard
- Gordon M. Hudson
- Günther Hummelt
- Roderick G. M. "Rod" Hunter
- Ron Hutton
- Peter Inch
- Niven M. Jackson
- Hazel I. Jamison
- "Shorty" Jenkins
- Clara Johnson
- Leo Johnson
- Katherine Johnston
- Colleen P. Jones
- Terry Jones (2019)
- Deborah "Debbie" Jones-Walker
- Christine Jurgenson
- June Kaufman
- John W. Kawaja
- Rae Kells (2019)
- Kim Kelly
- Bruce Kennedy
- Tracy Kennedy
- Eva Kerr
- F. Marjorie Kerr
- Nancy Kerr
- John Keys
- Cathy King
- Raymond A. "Ray" Kingsmith
- Sharon Knox
- Irene Konkin
- F. Evelyn "Ev" Krahn
- Connie Laliberte
- Arthur Lamb
- Lorraine Lang
- Richard P. "Rick" Lang
- Allan D. Langlois
- Penny LaRocque
- Vicki Lauder
- Wendy Leach
- William Leaman
- Don Lewis
- Ina C. Light
- Betty Linkletter
- Shirley Little
- Art Lobel
- Laura Lochanski
- William Low
- Frederick J. Lucas
- Ed Lukowich
- William E. "Bill" Lumsden
- Peter Lyall
- Jack Lynch
- Velma M. Lytle

=== M-R ===
- Harold L. Mabey Sr.
- Elizabeth "Liz" MacDonald
- Wendell L. MacDonald
- Alan N. MacGowan
- Joseph Alfred MacInnes
- Elbridge P. MacKay
- William J. MacKay
- Donald J. "Don" MacKenzie
- Daniel MacKinnon
- Aileen MacLean
- Donald R. MacLeod
- Mary MacMurray
- Murray MacNeill
- Dorothy "Dot" MacRea
- W. J. Magrath
- John S. Malcolm
- Harvey Malo
- Cliff Manahan
- Hadie Manley
- Lindy Marchuk
- Flora Martin
- Kevin Martin
- J. B. Mather
- Jack Matheson
- Douglas D. Maxwell
- Harvey G. Mazinke
- J. B. McArthur
- Joan McCusker
- Cameron McEwen
- Thomas McGaw
- Doug "Buzz" McGibney
- Larry McGrath
- Joyce McKee
- Shirley McKendry
- Ken McLean
- Lura McLuckie
- Burd McNeice
- Andrew McWilliams
- Janet Merry
- Edna "Ed" Messum
- Olive Mews
- Wayne Middaugh
- Maureen Miller
- Herbert C. "Herb" Millham
- Ronald A. Mills
- Marj Mitchell
- Lorne Mitton
- Linda Moore
- Shirley Morash
- Christine M. More
- Earle Morris
- Lenore "Lee" Morrison
- John Moss
- Clifford A. L. Murchison
- Jerry J. Muzika
- Joyce Myers
- Barry Naimark
- Darryl Neighbour
- Marilyn Neily
- R. Bruce Ness
- Dorothy New
- Mary-Anne Nicholson
- Bob Nicol
- Amy Nixon (2024)
- George Norgan
- Ronald C. Northcott
- J. Frank "OB" O'Brien
- Stanley Oleson
- Albert Olson
- L. E. "Bud" Olson
- Ole Olson
- Clyde R. Opaleychuk
- Anne Orser
- Cathy Overton-Clapham
- Jules Owchar (2019)
- William Parish
- Dave Parkes (2019)
- Albert Parkhill
- James G. "Ted" Pattee
- Gerry Peckham
- Pat Perroud
- Charles Perry
- Don Petlak
- James K. Pettapiece
- David Petursson (2019)
- Vera Pezer
- Alf Phillips Jr. (2023)
- Bob Picken
- Bob Pickering
- William Piercey
- Peggy Piers
- Violet Pike
- Ernest Pollard
- Muriel Porter
- Rita C. Proulx
- Graham Prouse
- H. Fielding Rankine
- Vic Rauter
- Patricia Ray
- Thomas H. Rennie
- Arnold W. Richardson
- Carleton Richardson
- Ernie Richardson
- "Sam" Richardson
- Wesley H. "Wes" Richardson
- Norman P. Rockwell
- Barbara Roper
- Samuel "Sam" Rothschild
- Sheila Rowan
- Marion "Doodle" Rowlands
- Adeline Roy
- Patrick J. C. "Pat" Ryan

=== S-Z ===
- Olivier Samson
- Pat Sanders
- Zivan Saper
- Frank F. Sargent
- Paul Savage
- Sandra Schmirler
- Mabel Dalton Segsworth
- John Shea
- Jerry Shoemaker
- Anita Silvernagle (2024)
- John A. Sinclair
- Marjorie H. Sinclair
- Ronald Singbusch
- F. Arthur "Art" Skinner
- Julie Skinner
- James Smart
- David C. "Dave" Smith
- Sir Donald Smith
- Emmett Smith
- Yvonne Smith
- Jean Snowdon
- Bernie Sparkes
- Lindsay E. Sparkes (Davie)
- John D. Squarebriggs
- Edward O. "Ed" Steeves
- Frank M. Stent
- A. E. Stephenson
- David Macdonald Stewart
- T. Howard Stewart
- Walter Stewart
- Reginald E. Stone
- Roy Stone
- Frederick L. "Fred" Storey
- Toro Suzuki
- Brent A. Syme
- Michael Szajewski (2025)
- A. Ross Tarlton
- Ian Tetley
- Nick Thibodeau
- Dennis Thiessen
- Cliff Thompson
- Dorothy Thompson
- T. Gordon Thompson
- Ted Thonger
- Edith Tipping
- Lee Tobin
- Fran Todd
- Gerry Tomalty
- Richard T. "Dick" Topping
- Clif Torey
- William R. "Bill" Tracy
- Thomas Travers
- Evan Trites
- Raymond C. "Ray" Turnbull
- Thora Turner
- James Tyre
- James W. Ursel
- Wally Ursuliak
- Margaret E. Valentine
- Patti Vandekerckhove
- Judith Veinot
- Donald J. "Don" Walchuk
- David Walker
- Jo Wallace
- William J. "Billy" Walsh
- Cy Walters
- Grant Watson
- Islay "Ila" Watson
- Ken Watson
- Cecil Watt
- Hazel Watt
- Horace P. Webb
- Bob Weeks
- Kenneth B. Weldon
- Jack Wells
- Jimmy Welsh
- Edward "Ed" Werenich
- Hugh E. "Jim" Weyman
- C. E. Joan Whalley
- Elma-Mae Whitehead
- Twyla Widdifield
- Errick F. Willis
- Archibald E. Wilson
- Jim Wilson
- Robin Wilson
- Tom Wilson
- Marvin Wirth
- Don Wittman
- Bryan Wood
- Daniel John Howard "Pappy" Wood Sr.
- Larry Wood
- Nora Wood
- Emily Woolley
- Muriel Youngson
