= Matt Baldwin =

Canadian curler (1926–2023)

Matt Baldwin CM
- Curler
- Born: May 3, 1926; Blucher, Saskatchewan, Canada
- Died: April 8, 2023 (aged 96)

Curling career
- Brier: 5 (1954, 1956, 1957, 1958, 1971)
Medal record
Representing Alberta
Macdonald Brier
Gold medal – first place	1954 Edmonton
Gold medal – first place	1957 Kingston
Gold medal – first place	1958 Victoria

Mathew Martyn Baldwin, CM (May 3, 1926 – April 8, 2023) was a Canadian curler from Edmonton, Alberta. He was a three-time Brier champion skip in the 1950s, and his success, coupled with his colourful charisma is credited with leading to a boom in curling in Edmonton. He also popularized the "long slide" delivery, used nearly exclusively by curlers today.

== Curling ==
Baldwin began curling at the age of 14 or 15 in Bradwell, Saskatchewan. At the time, most of the men in the town were fighting in World War II, so he was "conscripted" to play with senior-aged curlers at his local club.

Baldwin was a three-time Brier champion, having skipped his rink to the Canadian men's championship in 1954, 1957 and 1958. In 1954, Baldwin and his team of Glenn Gray, Pete Ferry and Jim Collins finished with a 9-1 record to claim their first Brier. At age 27, Baldwin was then the youngest skip to win a Brier, in an era when teams were generally led by men decades older. He is also remembered for pleasing a cheering Edmonton hometown crowd by sliding halfway down the sheet of ice when throwing his final rock of the event, a move that was legal under the curling rules of the time. The age record has since been broken; Kerry Burtnyk is the current holder of the mark. He also won the Alberta Curling Association Bonspiel Grand Aggregate, and the Edmonton ACT car bonspiel the same season.

In 1956, Baldwin returned to the Brier, but his team of Gord Haynes. Art Kleinmeyer and Bill Henning finished with a 5-5 record. In 1957, Baldwin and his team of Gord Haynes, Art Kleinmeyer and new lead Bill Price finished the round robin undefeated, giving Baldwin his second Brier. In 1958, Jack Geddes was inserted into the lineup to play third, replacing Haynes who was bumped back to second, who replaced the departing Kleinmeyer. The team finished the round robin with an 8-2 record, and had to defeat Terry Braunstein's Manitoba rink to claim the title.

Baldwin did not return to the Brier until 1971, where his team of Tom Kroeger, Rich Cust and Reg Van Wassenhove finished with a record of 5-5. In 1973 Baldwin became one of the original inductees into the Canadian Curling Hall of Fame. Baldwin also served as a director of the Edmonton Eskimos football team for five years and is recognized on the University of Alberta's Wall of Honour.

Baldwin was named to the Order of Canada in December 2019. Once the youngest curler to ever win the Brier, as of the appointment he was the oldest living Brier champion.

== Personal life ==
Baldwin was also a petroleum engineer, one of the early graduates from the University of Alberta's Petroleum Engineering program that launched in 1948 after the Leduc No. 1 discovery ignited the postwar oil boom in Alberta. He and classmate George Knoll formed Baldwin and Knoll, a well servicing company that became Canada's largest service rig company for three decades. He was a founding director of Alberta Energy Company, serving for 25 years, and in 2000 named a member of the Canadian Petroleum Hall of Fame. He was the son of Norman and Lillian. He went to elementary school in Blucher, and went to High School in Bradwell, and Nutana Collegiate. Before attending the University of Alberta, he took mechanical engineering at the University of Saskatchewan for three years before working as a roughneck in Lloydminster. He was married to Betty-Jean, and had three children. Baldwin died on April 8, 2023, at the age of 96.

== Sources ==
- Canada's Sports Hall of Fame profile
