= 1957 Macdonald Brier =

Canadian men's curling championship

- Host city: Kingston, Ontario
- Arena: Kingston Memorial Centre
- Dates: March 4–8
- Attendance: 19,000
- Winner: Alberta
- Curling club: Granite CC, Edmonton
- Skip: Matt Baldwin
- Third: Gordon Haynes
- Second: Art Kleinmeyer
- Lead: Bill Price

The 1957 Macdonald Brier, the Canadian men's national curling championship, was held from March 4 to 7, 1957 at Kingston Memorial Centre in Kingston, Ontario. A total of 19,000 fans attended the event.

Team Alberta, skipped by Matt Baldwin, won the Brier Tankard by finishing round robin play unbeaten with a 10–0 record. This was Alberta's sixth Brier championship and the second time Baldwin had won a title as a skip, with his first coming in 1954. It was also the tenth time in which a team finished a Brier undefeated.

Saskatchewan's 30–3 victory over New Brunswick in Draw 2 set a Brier record for most points scored in a game by one team (30) and the largest margin of victory in a game (27). This broke the previous records of set in 1934 by Ontario in their 26–2 victory over Nova Scotia. The game also tied the record set in 1932 for most combined points by both teams in a game (33). To date, the 30 points scored by Saskatchewan is still a Brier record.

This Brier also at the time broke a record for most extra ends played in a single Brier with eight. This broke the previous record of six, set in 1931.

== Teams ==
The teams are listed as follows:

Alberta	British Columbia	Manitoba	New Brunswick
Granite CC, Edmonton Skip: Matt Baldwin; Third: Gordon Haynes; Second: Art Kleinmeyer; Lead: Bill Price	Trail CC, Trail Skip: Reg Stone; Third: Roy Stone; Second: Douglas McGibney; Lead: Ernest Gordon	Granite CC, Winnipeg Skip: Howard Wood Jr. Third: William Sharp; Second: Don Duguid; Lead: Lorne Duguid	Carleton CC, Saint John Skip: Kenneth Everett; Third: Thomas McAlpine; Second: Robert Hutton; Lead: Douglas Neal
Newfoundland	Northern Ontario	Nova Scotia	Ontario
Blomidon CC, Corner Brook Skip: Alexander Fisher; Third: Wilbert Howell; Second: John Gullage; Lead: William Piercey	Port Arthur CC, Port Arthur Skip: Don McEwen; Third: James Simpson; Second: Donald Smeaton; Lead: Bill Tetley	Bridgewater CC, Bridgewater Skip: Ralph Simmons; Third: Pennell Richardson; Second: Robert Rafuse; Lead: Lee Rhodenizer	Champlain CC, Orillia Skip: Stan Sarjeant; Third: Roy Hewitt; Second: Earl Lamb; Lead: Harry Tissington
Prince Edward Island	Quebec	Saskatchewan
Summerside CC, Summerside Skip: Clifford MacDonald; Third: James Cameron; Second: William Mooreside; Lead: Gordon Stewart	Caledonia CC, Montreal Skip: Ken Weldon; Third: William Isaac; Second: Art Hutchingame; Lead: Bruce Coulter	Avonlea CC, Avonlea Skip: Garnet Campbell; Third: Glen Campbell; Second: Don Campbell; Lead: Lloyd Campbell

== Round-robin standings ==
Key
Brier champion

Province	Skip	W	L	PF	PA
Alberta	Matt Baldwin	10	0	113	60
Saskatchewan	Garnet Campbell	8	2	123	70
British Columbia	Reg Stone	7	3	115	87
Manitoba	Howard Wood Jr.	7	3	107	80
Ontario	Stan Sarjeant	6	4	95	91
Quebec	Ken Weldon	4	6	101	104
New Brunswick	Kenneth Everett	4	6	80	132
Nova Scotia	Ralph Simmons	3	7	79	106
Northern Ontario	Don McEwen	3	7	95	97
Prince Edward Island	Clifford MacDonald	2	8	84	105
Newfoundland	Alexander Fisher	1	9	73	133

== Round-robin results ==
All draw times are listed in Eastern Time (UTC-05:00)

=== Draw 1 ===
Monday, March 4 3:00 PM

Sheet A	1	2	3	4	5	6	7	8	9	10	11	12	Final
Prince Edward Island (MacDonald)	1	1	0	0	1	0	2	0	0	0	1	0	6
Saskatchewan (Campbell)	0	0	0	2	0	1	0	2	1	1	0	1	8

Sheet B	1	2	3	4	5	6	7	8	9	10	11	12	Final
Quebec (Weldon)	0	1	0	0	0	1	3	0	1	0	2	0	8
Alberta (Baldwin)	1	0	2	1	3	0	0	2	0	1	0	1	11

Sheet C	1	2	3	4	5	6	7	8	9	10	11	12	Final
Ontario (Sarjeant)	0	0	0	4	0	3	0	2	0	0	0	0	9
Newfoundland (Fisher)	1	1	1	0	2	0	2	0	2	1	1	1	12

Sheet D	1	2	3	4	5	6	7	8	9	10	11	12	13	Final
British Columbia (Stone)	0	0	0	1	0	1	0	0	1	0	3	3	2	11
Manitoba (Wood)	1	1	1	0	2	0	2	1	0	1	0	0	0	9

Sheet E	1	2	3	4	5	6	7	8	9	10	11	12	Final
Nova Scotia (Simmons)	1	0	0	3	0	2	0	1	0	1	0	1	9
Northern Ontario (McEwen)	0	1	2	0	2	0	1	0	1	0	1	0	8

=== Draw 2 ===
Monday, March 4 8:00 PM

Sheet A	1	2	3	4	5	6	7	8	9	10	11	12	Final
New Brunswick (Everett)	1	0	0	0	0	0	1	0	0	1	0	0	3
Saskatchewan (Campbell)	0	5	3	4	6	1	0	3	4	0	1	3	30

Sheet B	1	2	3	4	5	6	7	8	9	10	11	12	Final
Alberta (Baldwin)	1	2	1	0	3	0	3	1	1	0	2	0	14
Newfoundland (Fisher)	0	0	0	1	0	1	0	0	0	1	0	3	6

Sheet C	1	2	3	4	5	6	7	8	9	10	11	12	Final
Ontario (Sarjeant)	0	1	2	2	0	2	0	1	2	0	2	0	12
Prince Edward Island (MacDonald)	1	0	0	0	1	0	1	0	0	1	0	1	5

Sheet D	1	2	3	4	5	6	7	8	9	10	11	12	Final
British Columbia (Stone)	0	1	0	0	1	1	1	0	1	0	2	1	8
Nova Scotia (Simmons)	2	0	1	1	0	0	0	1	0	1	0	0	6

Sheet E	1	2	3	4	5	6	7	8	9	10	11	12	13	Final
Quebec (Weldon)	1	1	1	0	2	0	0	0	1	2	1	0	1	10
Northern Ontario (McEwen)	0	0	0	4	0	2	1	1	0	0	0	1	0	9

=== Draw 3 ===
Tuesday, March 5 9:30 AM

Sheet A	1	2	3	4	5	6	7	8	9	10	11	12	Final
Alberta (Baldwin)	1	1	2	1	1	0	2	1	0	2	2	4	17
Prince Edward Island (MacDonald)	0	0	0	0	0	1	0	0	2	0	0	0	3

Sheet B	1	2	3	4	5	6	7	8	9	10	11	12	Final
Newfoundland (Fisher)	0	0	0	0	0	0	2	0	1	0	1	2	6
Northern Ontario (McEwen)	2	2	2	2	1	1	0	5	0	3	0	0	18

Sheet C	1	2	3	4	5	6	7	8	9	10	11	12	Final
Quebec (Weldon)	0	0	2	0	2	1	0	2	1	0	2	0	10
British Columbia (Stone)	2	2	0	1	0	0	3	0	0	1	0	3	12

Sheet D	1	2	3	4	5	6	7	8	9	10	11	12	Final
Manitoba (Wood)	0	1	0	3	0	0	2	4	0	2	0	1	13
Nova Scotia (Simmons)	1	0	1	0	1	1	0	0	2	0	1	0	7

Sheet E	1	2	3	4	5	6	7	8	9	10	11	12	Final
New Brunswick (Everett)	0	0	1	0	0	1	0	0	1	1	1	1	6
Ontario (Sarjeant)	1	2	0	1	0	0	3	1	0	0	0	0	8

=== Draw 4 ===
Tuesday, March 5 2:30 PM

Sheet A	1	2	3	4	5	6	7	8	9	10	11	12	Final
Manitoba (Wood)	1	0	2	0	4	0	1	1	0	3	0	0	12
Quebec (Weldon)	0	2	0	1	0	1	0	0	2	0	1	1	8

Sheet B	1	2	3	4	5	6	7	8	9	10	11	12	Final
Northern Ontario (McEwen)	0	0	5	2	0	1	0	1	0	0	0	1	10
Prince Edward Island (MacDonald)	1	1	0	0	1	0	1	0	2	1	2	0	9

Sheet C	1	2	3	4	5	6	7	8	9	10	11	12	Final
Alberta (Baldwin)	0	3	0	0	2	0	1	3	0	1	0	1	11
New Brunswick (Everett)	1	0	1	0	0	1	0	0	1	0	1	0	5

Sheet D	1	2	3	4	5	6	7	8	9	10	11	12	Final
Saskatchewan (Campbell)	0	3	0	2	0	2	1	0	2	1	0	0	11
Ontario (Sarjeant)	1	0	1	0	1	0	0	1	0	0	1	1	6

Sheet E	1	2	3	4	5	6	7	8	9	10	11	12	Final
Newfoundland (Fisher)	0	0	0	0	2	0	0	0	0	0	0	0	2
British Columbia (Stone)	3	3	1	1	0	2	0	2	3	1	1	2	19

=== Draw 5 ===
Wednesday, March 6 3:00 PM

Sheet A	1	2	3	4	5	6	7	8	9	10	11	12	Final
Newfoundland (Fisher)	0	1	0	1	0	1	0	1	0	0	0	1	5
Manitoba (Wood)	2	0	1	0	5	0	1	0	2	1	1	0	13

Sheet B	1	2	3	4	5	6	7	8	9	10	11	12	13	Final
Prince Edward Island (MacDonald)	0	2	2	0	1	3	0	0	1	0	0	1	0	10
British Columbia (Stone)	1	0	0	1	0	0	1	1	0	3	3	0	1	11

Sheet C	1	2	3	4	5	6	7	8	9	10	11	12	Final
Northern Ontario (McEwen)	1	2	2	0	2	2	2	0	1	3	3	1	19
New Brunswick (Everett)	0	0	0	2	0	0	0	2	0	0	0	0	4

Sheet D	1	2	3	4	5	6	7	8	9	10	11	12	Final
Nova Scotia (Simmons)	0	1	1	3	2	2	0	0	3	0	0	1	13
Quebec (Weldon)	1	0	0	0	0	0	2	1	0	1	1	0	6

Sheet E	1	2	3	4	5	6	7	8	9	10	11	12	13	Final
Saskatchewan (Campbell)	1	1	0	1	0	1	0	2	0	1	0	0	0	7
Alberta (Baldwin)	0	0	1	0	1	0	1	0	1	0	2	1	1	8

=== Draw 6 ===
Wednesday, March 6 8:00 PM

Sheet A	1	2	3	4	5	6	7	8	9	10	11	12	Final
British Columbia (Stone)	1	1	1	0	5	1	1	0	0	1	2	0	13
New Brunswick (Everett)	0	0	0	2	0	0	0	1	1	0	0	1	5

Sheet B	1	2	3	4	5	6	7	8	9	10	11	12	Final
Nova Scotia (Simmons)	1	2	1	0	2	0	1	0	1	0	4	0	12
Newfoundland (Fisher)	0	0	0	1	0	2	0	3	0	1	0	1	8

Sheet C	1	2	3	4	5	6	7	8	9	10	11	12	Final
Northern Ontario (McEwen)	2	0	1	0	0	1	0	1	0	0	1	0	6
Saskatchewan (Campbell)	0	1	0	2	0	0	1	0	5	2	0	1	12

Sheet D	1	2	3	4	5	6	7	8	9	10	11	12	Final
Ontario (Sarjeant)	0	1	0	1	0	1	0	0	0	1	0	2	6
Alberta (Baldwin)	1	0	0	0	1	0	1	2	2	0	2	0	9

Sheet E	1	2	3	4	5	6	7	8	9	10	11	12	Final
Prince Edward Island (MacDonald)	0	1	0	0	1	2	0	1	0	2	0	2	9
Manitoba (Wood)	1	0	1	0	0	0	4	0	1	0	3	0	10

=== Draw 7 ===
Thursday, March 7 9:00 AM

Sheet A	1	2	3	4	5	6	7	8	9	10	11	12	Final
Quebec (Weldon)	2	1	0	2	0	0	4	3	0	0	3	0	15
Newfoundland (Fisher)	0	0	1	0	2	1	0	0	3	3	0	1	11

Sheet B	1	2	3	4	5	6	7	8	9	10	11	12	Final
Prince Edward Island (MacDonald)	0	2	1	0	2	0	1	0	5	1	0	1	13
Nova Scotia (Simmons)	1	0	0	1	0	1	0	1	0	0	1	0	5

Sheet C	1	2	3	4	5	6	7	8	9	10	11	12	Final
British Columbia (Stone)	0	1	3	0	1	0	1	1	0	2	0	2	11
Saskatchewan (Campbell)	2	0	0	2	0	3	0	0	5	0	1	0	13

Sheet D	1	2	3	4	5	6	7	8	9	10	11	12	Final
New Brunswick (Everett)	0	3	1	0	1	2	0	4	0	3	0	0	14
Manitoba (Wood)	3	0	0	1	0	0	1	0	1	0	1	1	8

Sheet E	1	2	3	4	5	6	7	8	9	10	11	12	13	Final
Ontario (Sarjeant)	0	2	0	0	0	1	0	2	1	2	0	0	3	11
Northern Ontario (McEwen)	1	0	1	1	1	0	1	0	0	0	1	2	0	8

=== Draw 8 ===
Thursday, March 7 3:00 PM

Sheet A	1	2	3	4	5	6	7	8	9	10	11	12	Final
Quebec (Weldon)	0	1	0	0	1	1	2	0	6	2	0	0	13
Prince Edward Island (MacDonald)	1	0	1	1	0	0	0	1	0	0	2	1	7

Sheet B	1	2	3	4	5	6	7	8	9	10	11	12	Final
New Brunswick (Everett)	1	1	3	0	0	0	3	2	1	0	4	0	15
Nova Scotia (Simmons)	0	0	0	3	3	2	0	0	0	1	0	1	10

Sheet C	1	2	3	4	5	6	7	8	9	10	11	12	Final
British Columbia (Stone)	2	2	0	1	0	1	0	1	0	1	1	0	9
Ontario (Sarjeant)	0	0	1	0	3	0	2	0	2	0	0	4	12

Sheet D	1	2	3	4	5	6	7	8	9	10	11	12	Final
Manitoba (Wood)	2	0	3	0	0	1	0	1	0	1	0	2	10
Saskatchewan (Campbell)	0	1	0	1	2	0	4	0	1	0	0	0	9

Sheet E	1	2	3	4	5	6	7	8	9	10	11	12	Final
Alberta (Baldwin)	1	0	0	0	3	1	0	3	0	0	2	1	11
Northern Ontario (McEwen)	0	2	1	1	0	0	3	0	0	1	0	0	8

=== Draw 9 ===
Thursday, March 7 8:00 PM

Sheet A	1	2	3	4	5	6	7	8	9	10	11	12	Final
Newfoundland (Fisher)	1	1	0	2	1	2	0	1	0	0	0	0	8
Prince Edward Island (MacDonald)	0	0	1	0	0	0	1	0	4	2	3	1	12

Sheet B	1	2	3	4	5	6	7	8	9	10	11	12	Final
Saskatchewan (Campbell)	1	0	3	0	3	2	0	1	1	0	1	1	13
Nova Scotia (Simmons)	0	1	0	1	0	0	1	0	0	4	0	0	7

Sheet C	1	2	3	4	5	6	7	8	9	10	11	12	Final
New Brunswick (Everett)	0	1	0	1	0	0	2	1	0	1	0	1	7
Quebec (Weldon)	3	0	4	0	3	1	0	0	1	0	2	0	14

Sheet D	1	2	3	4	5	6	7	8	9	10	11	12	Final
Manitoba (Wood)	0	3	0	2	0	1	2	0	2	0	4	0	14
Ontario (Sarjeant)	1	0	2	0	2	0	0	1	0	1	0	1	8

Sheet E	1	2	3	4	5	6	7	8	9	10	11	12	13	Final
Alberta (Baldwin)	0	2	0	1	0	0	3	0	3	0	1	0	3	13
British Columbia (Stone)	1	0	2	0	3	0	0	2	0	1	0	1	0	10

=== Draw 10 ===
Friday, March 8

Sheet A	1	2	3	4	5	6	7	8	9	10	11	12	Final
Nova Scotia (Simmons)	0	0	1	0	0	0	1	0	0	1	0	0	3
Alberta (Baldwin)	0	3	0	2	1	1	0	2	1	0	0	2	12

Sheet B	1	2	3	4	5	6	7	8	9	10	11	12	Final
Saskatchewan (Campbell)	0	0	0	2	3	3	0	2	1	0	0	0	11
Newfoundland (Fisher)	0	1	1	0	0	0	1	0	0	0	1	2	6

Sheet C	1	2	3	4	5	6	7	8	9	10	11	12	Final
Northern Ontario (McEwen)	0	0	0	0	0	0	0	0	2	0	0	0	2
Manitoba (Wood)	2	1	1	2	1	1	1	1	0	2	1	1	14

Sheet D	1	2	3	4	5	6	7	8	9	10	11	12	Final
Ontario (Sarjeant)	0	2	0	2	2	0	0	3	0	2	0	2	13
Quebec (Weldon)	3	0	1	0	0	0	2	0	2	0	2	0	10

Sheet E	1	2	3	4	5	6	7	8	9	10	11	12	13	Final
Prince Edward Island (MacDonald)	2	1	0	0	1	0	2	0	1	2	0	1	0	10
New Brunswick (Everett)	0	0	2	5	0	1	0	2	0	0	0	0	1	11

=== Draw 11 ===
Friday, March 8

Sheet A	1	2	3	4	5	6	7	8	9	10	11	12	Final
Northern Ontario (McEwen)	0	0	0	1	0	0	2	1	0	2	0	1	7
British Columbia (Stone)	1	2	1	0	1	1	0	0	4	0	1	0	11

Sheet B	1	2	3	4	5	6	7	8	9	10	11	12	Final
Saskatchewan (Campbell)	2	0	1	0	2	0	1	0	2	0	1	0	9
Quebec (Weldon)	0	2	0	1	0	1	0	1	0	0	0	2	7

Sheet C	1	2	3	4	5	6	7	8	9	10	11	12	Final
Nova Scotia (Simmons)	0	1	0	1	0	2	0	0	2	0	1	0	7
Ontario (Sarjeant)	1	0	1	0	2	0	3	1	0	1	0	1	10

Sheet D	1	2	3	4	5	6	7	8	9	10	11	12	13	Final
Newfoundland (Fisher)	0	1	0	1	0	0	0	2	3	0	2	0	0	9
New Brunswick (Everett)	0	0	1	0	2	1	1	0	0	2	0	2	1	10

Sheet E	1	2	3	4	5	6	7	8	9	10	11	12	Final
Manitoba (Wood)	1	0	0	1	0	0	0	1	0	1	0	0	4
Alberta (Baldwin)	0	1	0	0	1	1	2	0	1	0	0	1	7
