= John B. Mather =

Canadian businessman and politician

John B Mather (c. 1845 – 31 January 1892) was the son of Scottish immigrants and became a Canadian businessman and politician.

Mather was born in Islington, Canada West.

Mather's early introduction to business was as an employee of Frank Smith, a leading grocer in Toronto. He moved to Winnipeg, Manitoba, in 1881 and established himself as a leading Winnipeg wholesaler. It was a time when the business emphasis in the West was switching from the Hudson's Bay Company and the St Paul, Minnesota merchants to products and businesses from eastern Canada. He quickly became successful in business and involved himself in his new home's social and political life.

In 1887, he was president of the Granite Curling Club, and in 1890, he was elected as an alderman to the Winnipeg City Council.

He was inducted into the Canadian Curling Hall of Fame in 1974.
