= Art Kleinmeyer =

Canadian curler

- Curler
- Born: 1914
- Died: December 23, 2000 (aged 86); Athabasca, Alberta
Medal record
Representing Alberta
Macdonald Brier
Gold medal – first place	1957 Kingston

Arthur Albert Kleinmeyer (1914 – December 23, 2000) was a Canadian curler. He played as second on the 1957 Brier-winning Team Alberta, skipped by Matt Baldwin. He was from Edmonton and worked for Imperial Oil. He began curling in Wainwright, Alberta.
