= Maurice Campbell =

Canadian curler

Maurice Campbell (November 28, 1919 – July 4, 2014) was a Canadian curler from Trois-Rivières, Quebec.

Campbell was born November 28, 1919 in Saint-Hyacinthe, Quebec. Educated at the University of Montreal, he joined the Royal Canadian Army Medical Corps in 1943 and completed his medical degree in 1945 and was subsequently posted in Halifax, Nova Scotia. He was a specialist in rheumatology and internal medicine and practiced in Cap-de-la-Madeleine, Quebec.

Campbell played in the 1958 Macdonald Brier, playing lead for the Quebec team, skipped by Bob Lahaie. The team finished 9th, with a 3-7 record.

He was President of the Quebec Curling Association for the 1963-64 season. He served as president of the Canadian Curling Association for the 1970-71 season and was named to the Canadian Curling Hall of Fame.

Campbell died in Trois-Rivières on July 4, 2014.
