= Bill Price (curler) =

Canadian curler

- Curler
- Born: July 18, 1927
- Died: December 12, 2021 (aged 94); Calgary, Alberta, Canada
Medal record
Representing Alberta
Macdonald Brier
Gold medal – first place	1957 Kingston
Gold medal – first place	1958 Victoria

William Hilliard Slade Price (July 18, 1927 – December 12, 2021) was a Canadian curler. He played as lead on the 1957 and 1958 Brier-winning Team Alberta, skipped by Matt Baldwin.

Price grew up in Saskatoon and attended the University of Alberta where he studied chemical engineering. There, he won the Gene Carrigan Trophy as the Edmonton's most outstanding junior athlete, as he was a top basketball player for the Alberta Golden Bears and was a top city baseball player at the time. He lived in Edmonton. He married Margaret Jeanne (Peggy) Blundell in 1950. and had six children. Price died in Calgary on December 12, 2021.
