= Jack Geddes (curler) =

Canadian curler

- Curler
- Born: c. 1925; Milestone, Saskatchewan, Canada
- Died: August 28, 2017 (aged 92); Edmonton, Alberta, Canada
Medal record
Representing Alberta
Macdonald Brier
Gold medal – first place	1958 Victoria

John Geddes (c. 1925 – August 28, 2017) was a Canadian curler. He played as third on the 1958 Brier-winning Team Alberta, skipped by Matt Baldwin. He was from Edmonton and was a dentist and graduated from the University of Alberta. Geddes died in 2017, aged 92.
