= Ray Turnbull (curler) =

Canadian curler

- Curler
- Born: July 19, 1939; Huntsville, Ontario
- Died: October 6, 2017 (aged 78); Winnipeg, Manitoba

Curling career
- Brier: 2 (1958, 1965)
- World Championship: 1 (1965)
Medal record
Representing Canada
Men's Curling
World Curling Championships
Silver medal – second place	1965 Perth	Team
Macdonald Brier
Representing Manitoba
Gold medal – first place	1965 Saskatoon
Silver medal – second place	1958 Victoria

Raymond Charles William "Moosie" Turnbull (July 19, 1939 – October 6, 2017) was a Canadian curler, coach and broadcaster from Manitoba. From 1985 to 2010, he was a member of the TSN curling coverage team along with Vic Rauter and Linda Moore.

== Curling ==
Turnbull won the 1965 Brier as the lead for the Terry Braunstein team. The team would finish second to the United States in the World Curling Championships. He was named the all-star lead at both competitions.

Turnbull also represented Manitoba at two Canadian Senior Curling Championships, in 1994 and 1995.

== Coaching ==
More than anyone else Ray Turnbull can be credited with taking curling around the world. Starting in the late 1960s Turnbull ran curling clinics across Europe, Japan and The United States. Ray Turnbull gets a fair share of the credit for teaching the Europeans both the technical skills and the strategy that saw the World Men's Championship trophy reside in Sweden, Norway or Switzerland six times between 1973 and 1984. Canada won only three times in that period. Beginning in 1979, European teams also won four of the first five World Women's championships while Canada earned only one win. Turnbull's coaching had helped create a time of international curling dominance by Europe which was a stepping stone to the sport's current Olympic status.

== Broadcasting ==
In 1981, Turnbull was chief umpire at the World Curling Championships. After the final draw, Turnbull rousted a Global sports reporter for ignoring CBC's television rights. That reporter, Vic Rauter, would become Turnbull's broadcasting partner five years later.

Ray Turnbull served as a curling commentator for TSN for 25 years. Working with Vic Rauter and Linda Moore, he contributed to the sport's increased popularity. Turnbull was noted for his ability to explain the technical aspects of curling to a broad audience, ranging from beginners to professionals. During his career, the broadcast team saw championship curling achieve some of the highest viewership numbers among Canadian sports.

Turnbull retired from broadcasting at the end of the 2009–10 curling season following the Vancouver Olympics.

== Honours ==
In 1993, he was inducted into the Canadian Curling Hall of Fame as both a curler and a builder. He was inducted into the Manitoba Sports Hall of Fame in 2009. He was inducted into the World Curling Hall of Fame in 2015.

== Personal life ==
Turnbull was born on July 19, 1939 and was a native of Huntsville, Ontario. Turnbull died at the Winnipeg Health Sciences Centre of leukemia. He had 5 children: Leanne, Lori, Scott, Allan, and Reginald.
