= Ray Grant (curler) =

Canadian curler (1934–2020)

- Curler
- Born: 1934; North York, Ontario
- Died: July 24, 2020

Curling career
- Brier: 1955, 1958, 1965
Medal record
Representing Ontario
Macdonald Brier
Bronze medal – third place	1955 Regina
Bronze medal – third place	1958 Victoria

Ray Ross Grant (1934 – July 24, 2020) was a Canadian curler. He played in three Briers, Canada's national men's curling championship, and one Canadian Mixed Curling Championship.

Grant began curling in 1950 in Toronto at the Royal Canadian Curling Club. He joined his father Andrew's rink in 1954 at lead, winning his first Ontario men's championship in 1955. At the 1955 Brier, the team finished third with a 7–3 record. Grant later joined the Unionville Curling Club. He won his second Ontario championship in 1958 playing second for the Murray Roberts rink. That team represented Ontario at the 1958 Brier, where they finished in third place. In 1965, skipping his own team of Keith Jewett, Ray McGee and Al Claney, Grant won his third Ontario title. At the 1965 Brier, he led Ontario to a 5–5 record. Also in 1965, Grant won the Ontario Mixed championship, skipping a team that included Helen Jewett, Keith Jewett, and his wife Mary. The team represented Ontario at the 1965 Canadian Mixed Championship, finishing in second place, with a 9–1 record.

== Personal life ==
Grant was born in North York, Ontario. He worked as a farmer in Stouffville, Ontario for most of his life. He was married to Mary Grant, and had three children. In his youth, he was interested in the Junior Farmers movement and also enjoyed baseball.
