= Gordon Haynes (curler) =

Canadian curler

- Curler
- Born: June 22, 1918
- Died: December 24, 2004 (aged 86); Calgary, Alberta, Canada
Medal record
Representing Alberta
Macdonald Brier
Gold medal – first place	1957 Kingston
Gold medal – first place	1958 Victoria

John Gordon Haynes (June 22, 1918 – December 24, 2004) was a Canadian curler. He played on the 1957 and 1958 Brier-winning Team Albertas, skipped by Matt Baldwin. He was from Edmonton and worked for Canadian Pacific Express. He began curling in Sedgwick, Alberta. Haynes died in December 2004 at the age of 86.
