= Granite Curling Club (Winnipeg) =

Premier curling rink in Winnipeg, Canada

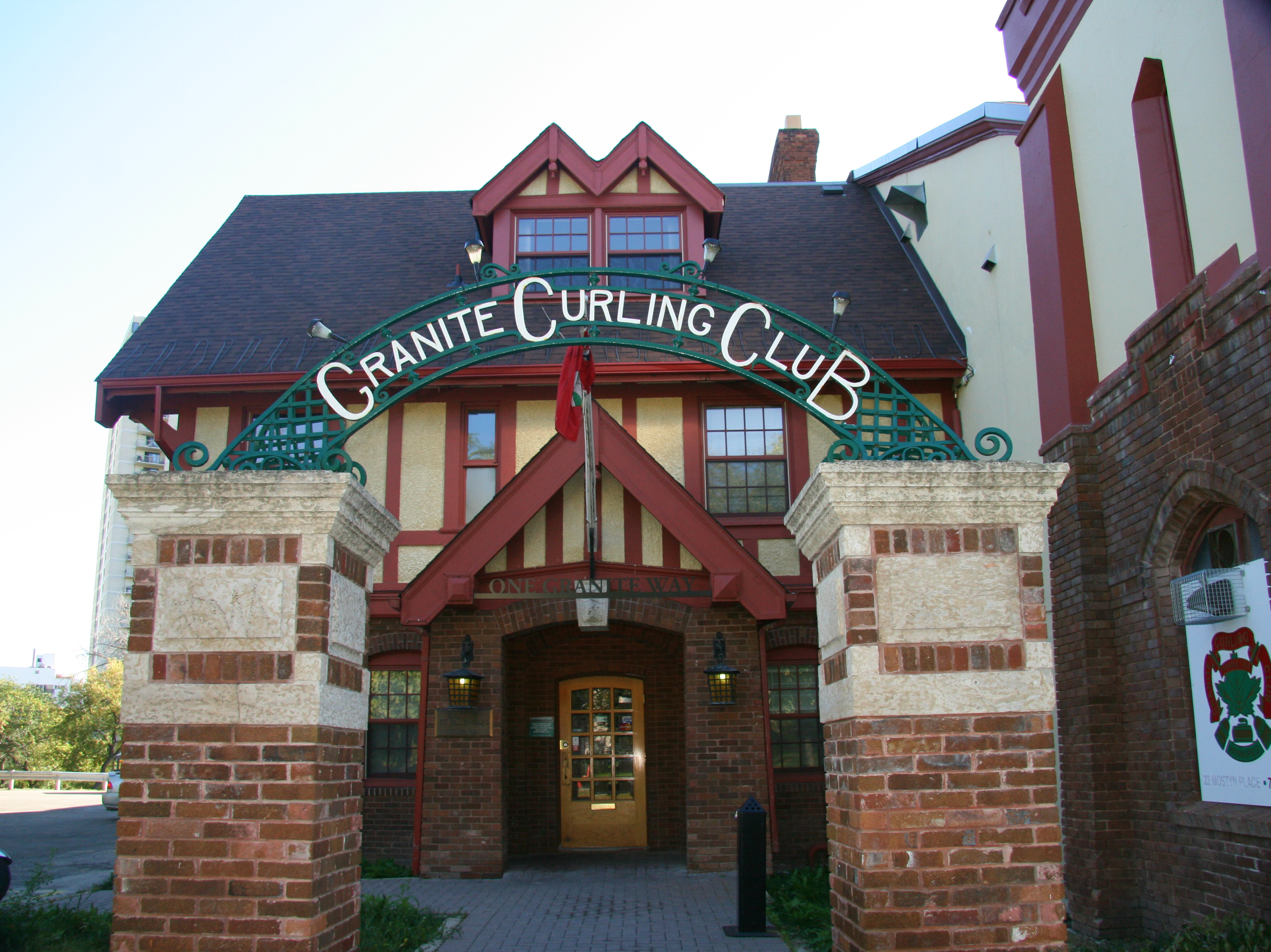
- Exterior of Granite Curling Club, Winnipeg

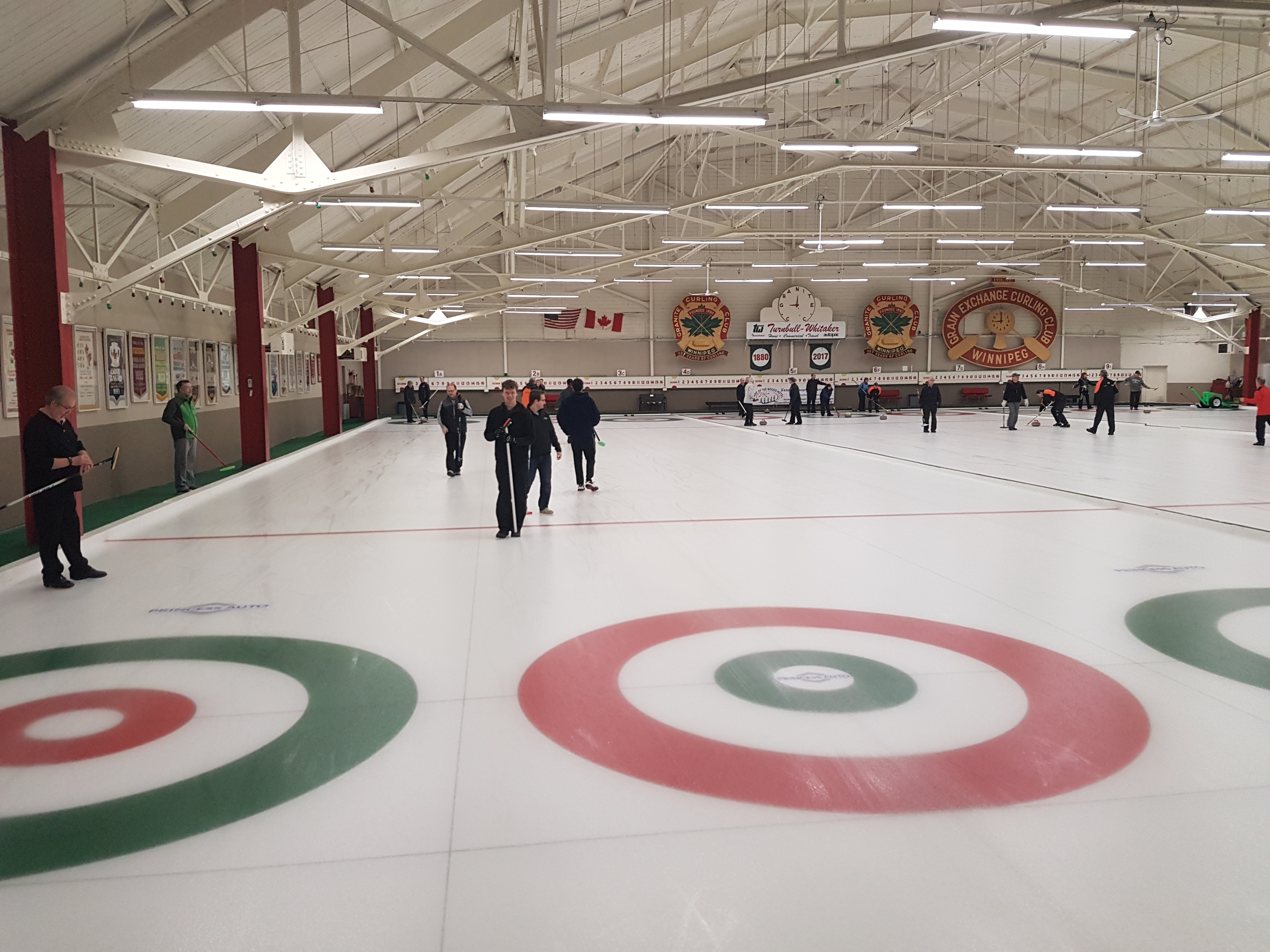
- Interior ice-level of Granite Curling Club, Winnipeg
- Interactive map of Granite Curling Club
- Location: One Granite Way; Winnipeg, Manitoba R3C 0Y9; Canada; 49.8825°N 97.1505°W

Information
- Established: 1880 (first building); 1913 (current building)
- Club type: Dedicated ice
- Curling Canada region: Curl Manitoba
- Sheets of ice: Nine
- Website: https://www.granitecurlingclub.ca/

Municipally Designated Site
- Designation: Winnipeg Landmark Heritage Structure
- Recognized: September 29, 1986
- CRHP listing: November 13, 2007
- Recognition authority: City of Winnipeg
- ID: 8215

The Granite Curling Club, also known as The Granite, is a curling club located in Winnipeg, Manitoba. Established in 1880, it is the oldest curling club in western Canada. Affectionately known to curling fans as the "Mother Club", it has produced many Canadian and world champions. It is often considered to be the "St. Andrews" of curling because of its contribution to the sport in curling's most dominant region.

== History ==
The original Granite Curling Club dates back to 1880. Its current downtown location and Tudor-framed clubhouse was built in 1913, and the building has since been designated as a Winnipeg Heritage Building.

One of the early presidents was John B. Mather, who assumed that position in 1887.

Since 2005, the club has hosted the Keystone Curling League, an LGBT league and member of the Canadian Pride Curling Association. Keystone and the Granite have twice hosted the Canadian Gay Curling Championships, most recently in 2016, when Manitoba champions and Olympic gold medalists Kaitlyn Lawes and Jill Officer threw the ceremonial first rock.

== Men's provincial and national champions ==
Year	Name	Brier Championships	World Championships
1925	Howard Wood, Sr.		
1927	Gordon Hudson		
1930	Howard Wood, Sr.	(gold) Champions	
1932	Jim Congalton	(gold) Champions	
1940	Howard Wood, Sr.	(gold) Champions	
1945	Howard Wood, Sr.		
1948	George Sangster		
1957	Howard Wood, Jr.		
1958	Terry Braunstein		
1965	Terry Braunstein	(gold) Champions	(silver) Silver
1970	Don Duguid	(gold) Champions	(gold) Gold
1971	Don Duguid	(gold) Champions	(gold) Gold
1973	Danny Fink		
1975	Rod Hunter		
1992	Vic Peters	(gold) Champions	(bronze) Bronze
1993	Vic Peters		
1997	Vic Peters	(silver) Runner-Up	
1998	Dale Duguid		
2003	John Bubbs		
2024	Brad Jacobs		
2025	Reid Carruthers		
2026	Matt Dunstone	(gold) Champions	

=== Notable members ===
- Kate Cameron
- Jason Gunnlaugson
- Leslie Wilson-Westcott
- Raunora Westcott
