= Don Duguid =

Canadian curler (1935–2026)

Don Duguid CM OM
- Curler
- Born: Donald Gordon Duguid; October 21, 1935; Winnipeg, Manitoba, Canada
- Died: July 15, 2026 (aged 90)

Curling career
- Brier: 4 (1957, 1965, 1970, 1971)
- World Championship: 3 (1965, 1970, 1971)
Medal record
Men's curling
Representing Canada
World Championships
Gold medal – first place	1970 Utica
Gold medal – first place	1971 Megève
Silver medal – second place	1965 Perth
Representing Manitoba
Macdonald Brier
Gold medal – first place	1965 Saskatoon
Gold medal – first place	1970 Winnipeg
Gold medal – first place	1971 Quebec City
Bronze medal – third place	1957 Kingston

Donald Gordon Duguid CM OM (October 21, 1935 – July 15, 2026) was a Canadian champion curler. A three-time winner of the Canadian Brier and two-time World Curling champion, Duguid won the Brier in 1965, 1970 and 1971, and the Worlds in 1970 and 1971. He was only the second skip ever to win back to back Briers in 1971. He was inducted into the Canadian Curling Hall of Fame in 1974, Canada's Sports Hall of Fame in 1991, and the WCF Hall of Fame in 2013. In 2014, he was made a member of the Order of Manitoba. In 1981, his 1970 & 1971 teams were inducted into the Manitoba Sports Hall of Fame.

Duguid provided curling commentary for NBC at the 2002 Winter Olympics in Salt Lake City and the 2006 Winter Olympics in Turin with Don Chevrier, and with Andrew Catalon and Colleen Jones at the 2010 Winter Olympics in Vancouver.

== Personal life ==
Duguid was the son of a Scottish immigrant, and grew up in Winnipeg's west end.

He was the father of Terry Duguid, a Manitoba businessman and politician (member of Parliament for Winnipeg South), as well as Dale Duguid, a former Manitoba provincial curling champion. His brother Gerry played in the Canadian Football League, and his sister-in-law Betty was a Canadian and U.S. champion curler.

Duguid was an avid golfer. He was a lifetime member of St. Boniface Golf Club in Winnipeg and was elected president of the club, serving from 1980 to 1981.

In 2020, he was appointed a member of the Order of Canada.

Duguid died on July 15, 2026, at the age of 90.

Preceded by Doug Maxwell	CBC Sports lead curling analyst (with Colleen Jones 1986–1997 and Sandra Schmirler 1998–1999); 1972–2000	Succeeded by Mike Harris & Joan McCusker
