= Terry Braunstein =

Canadian curler

- Curler
- Born: April 18, 1939 (age 87)

Curling career
- Brier: 2 (1958, 1965)
Medal record
Representing Canada
Men's Curling
World Curling Championships
| Silver medal – second place | 1965 Perth | Team |
Macdonald Brier
Representing Manitoba
| Gold medal – first place | 1965 Saskatoon |
| Silver medal – second place | 1958 Victoria |

Terrance A. "Terry" Braunstein (born April 18, 1939) is a Canadian retired curler. He skipped Team Manitoba to winning the 1965 Brier, and later went on to win a silver medal at the Curling World Championships of that year.
