= Boston University College of Fine Arts =

Institute of Fine Arts in Boston, Massachusetts

Coordinates: 42.3512°N 71.1135°W

- Type: Private
- Established: 1872; 154 years ago (with the establishment of the College of Music)
- Parent institution: Boston University
- Dean: Harvey Young
- Location: Boston, Massachusetts, United States
- Campus: Urban
- Website: bu.edu/cfa

The Boston University College of Fine Arts (CFA) is the performing, cinematic, and media arts school of Boston University. Founded in 1872 with the establishment of the College of Music, it is an institution that trains artists, scholars of the arts, and filmmakers. Since the College of Fine Arts is integrated into Boston University, students at CFA may choose courses in the other undergraduate colleges at Boston University. CFA students can also apply for the Boston University Collaborative Degree Program (BUCOP), where students simultaneously earn undergraduate degrees at CFA and in one of 14 undergraduate colleges of the university. The college offers a study abroad program in London, England, and Dresden, Germany. Students can spend a semester at the Royal College of Music, the London Academy of Music and Dramatic Art, or at the Hochschule für Musik "Carl Maria von Weber".

Admission to the College of Fine Arts requires a live or pre-recorded audition for music and theatrical performance majors and a submission of a portfolio for visual arts and technical theatre majors.

== School of Music ==
The Boston University School of Music was founded in 1872, which makes it the oldest degree-granting music program in the United States. The School of Music offers the Bachelor of Music (BM), the Master of Music (MM), and the Doctorate of Musical Arts (DMA). All students have the option of concentrating in fields such as performance, music theory and composition, musicology, music education, historical performance, and conducting. The School of Music offers special degrees such as the Performance Diploma and the Artist Diploma. The Performance Diploma is a non-degree program for students who want a continued education in music performance at the post-Masters level.

The School of Music has about 150 faculty members (professors, assistant professors, adjunct professors, and teaching associates). Some notable music professors include: Edwin Barker (double bass), Ann Howard Jones (conducting), George Neikrug (cello), Tim Genis (percussion), Andre de Quadros (music education), Sharon Daniels (voice), Jerrold Pope (voice), Kenneth Radnofsky (saxophone) and Penelope Bitzas (voice).

The Boston University School of Music has a summer music festival for high school students known as the Boston University Tanglewood Institute (BUTI).

Boston University's School of Music is affiliated with several ensembles and organizations that provide an extension of its core programs. Among these are the contemporary music ensemble-in-residence Alea III, the Muir String Quartet, and Boston Youth Symphony Orchestras.

The Boston University School of Music offers online music education options, and by the end of 2007, more than 600 online graduate students were expected to be studying for a Master of Music (MM) or Doctor of Musical Arts (DMA) degree through this College.

== School of Visual Arts ==
Founded in 1954, the Boston University School of Visual Arts offers the Bachelor of Fine Arts (BFA) and the Master of Fine Arts (MFA) in areas such as graphic design, art education, sculpture, and painting. Visits from artists and lecturers as well as a widely varied program of exhibitions are offered. Four on-campus galleries—the BU Art Gallery, the Commonwealth Gallery, the 808 Gallery, and the Sherman Gallery—provide exhibition opportunities for graduate students and alumni.

Facilities available to students include a computer lab, a new media room, a welding shop, a wood shop, and painting, drawing, printmaking, and photography studios.

== School of Theatre ==
The School of Theatre at Boston University is a conservatory-style training program emphasizing collaboration and ensemble. The school offers the Bachelor of Fine Arts (BFA) and the Master of Fine Arts (MFA), as well as Artisan Certificates for technical theatre students. BFA degrees are offered in acting, theatre arts, theatrical design and production, stage management, and MFA degrees are offered in design, production, theatre education, and directing.

The School operates four theatre spaces in the College of Fine Arts, as well as the Joan & Edgar Booth Theatre and CFA Production Center, located on BU Campus at 820 Commonwealth Ave. Opened in 2017, the facility houses a theatre, as well as the School's scene, paint, costume, lighting, and sound shops.

== Notable alumni ==
The College of Fine Arts has produced many students who have become notable in their fields:

=== Visual Arts ===
- Grant Drumheller (painter)
- Brice Marden (painter)
- Christina McPhee (New Media artist)
- Brian McLean (visual effects artist)

=== Music ===
- Aesop Rock (rapper and hip-hop record producer)
- Ted Atkatz (Chicago Symphony Orchestra Principal Percussionist)
- Velvet Brown (tuba soloist, music educator)
- Janet Chvatal (classical soprano and award-winning musical producer)
- Sylvia Constantinidis (Venezuelan-American classical pianist, composer, conductor, writer, music educator)
- Marcus Haddock (opera singer)
- Eugene Izotov (Chicago Symphony Orchestra Principal Oboist)
- Konstantinos Papadakis (concert pianist)
- Scott Perkins (composer)
- Anthony Tommasini (New York Times music critic)
- Wen-Pin Hope Lee (music educator and composer)
- Julian Wachner (composer, conductor and keyboardist)
- Uzo Aduba (actress, performer)
- John A. Ross (composer, choral conductor, organist)

=== Performing Arts ===
- Jason Alexander (Tony Award-winning actor; cast member of Seinfeld)
- Jennifer Armour (actress and voice artist)
- Tala Ashe (actress, Legends of Tomorrow)
- Kathy Baker (Emmy, SAG, and Golden Globes award winning actress)
- Jon Bass (actor)
- Michael Chiklis (Emmy Award-winning actor, The Shield)
- Geena Davis (Oscar- and Golden Globe-winning actress)
- Emily Deschanel (actress, Bones)
- Hampton Fluker (actor, Shades of Blue, The Terror)
- Dan Fogler (Tony Award-winning actor; The 25th Annual Putnam County Spelling Bee)
- Ginnifer Goodwin (actress, Big Love)
- Israel Hicks (1943–2010), stage director who presented August Wilson's entire 10-play Pittsburgh Cycle.
- Yunjin Kim (actress, Lost)
- Erica Leerhsen (actress)
- Jerry Levine (actor/director, Teen Wolf)
- Craig Lucas (Tony Award- and Pulitzer Prize-nominated playwright and actor)
- Yan Luo (actress and screenwriter)
- Julianne Moore (Oscar-winning actress)
- Olympia Dukakis (Oscar-winning actress)
- Michael Murray, co-founder and Artistic Director of the Charles Playhouse (Boston), Artistic Director of the Cincinnati Playhouse in the Park, Chair of Theatre Arts Department, Brandeis University
- Rosie O'Donnell (actress and talk show host)
- Jenn Proske (actress)
- Ola Rotimi (Award-winning playwright and theatre director)
- Lee Sheldon (videogame designer, author, TV writer/producer)
- Nina Tassler (President of CBS Entertainment)
- Marisa Tomei (Academy Award-winning actress)
- Krista Vernoff (Emmy-nominated writer)
- Michaela Watkins (SNL actress)
- Cynthia Watros (actress, Lost)
- Alfre Woodard (Emmy- and Golden Globe-winning actress)
- Alex Wyse (Broadway actor)
- Ashley Williams (actress, How I Met Your Mother)
- Mary Wiseman (actress, Star Trek: Discovery)
- Katya Zamolodchikova (drag queen, actor, comedian, RuPaul's Drag Race)
