= John Ross =

John, Johnny or Jack Ross may refer to:

== Entertainment ==
- John Ross (author) (1957–2022), American author of the 1996 novel Unintended Consequences
- John F. Ross (author), American historian and author
- John Ross (printer), printer and publisher in 18th-century Carmarthen
- John Ross (publisher), printer and publisher in 19th-century Newcastle
- John Ross (artist) (fl. 1996), British comic book artist
- Jack Ross (musician) (1916–1982), rock and roll singles in 1962
- Jack Ross (writer) (born 1962), New Zealand poet and novelist
- John Ross Ewing III, character in the TV series Dallas
- John A. Ross (composer) (1940–2006), African American jazz musician, composer and choral conductor
- Johnny Ross (musician) (1942–2006), American multi-instrumentalist and singer-songwriter
- John Ross, former drummer of Hostage Calm

== Law ==
- John Ross of the Inner Temple (1563–1607), English barrister and poet
- John Wesley Ross (1841–1902), American attorney in Washington, D.C.
- Sir John Ross, 1st Baronet (1853–1935), Irish judge and Unionist politician
- John Rolly Ross (1899–1963), U.S. federal judge
- John William Ross (1878–1925), U.S. federal judge
- John Wilson Ross (1863–1945), justice of the Supreme Court of Arizona
- John Andrew Ross (born 1954), Missouri judge

== Military ==
- John Ross (American patriot) (1726–1800), figure in the American Revolution
- John Lockhart-Ross (1721–1790), admiral of the British Royal Navy
- John Ross (British Army officer, died 1809) (1744–1809), British Army officer
- John Ross (Royal Navy officer) (1777–1856), British naval officer and Polar explorer
- John E. Ross (1818–1890), fought in the Modoc War
- John Ross (VC) (1822–1879), Scottish corporal of the British Army during the Crimean War
- John Ross (British Army officer, born 1829) (1829–1905), British commander
- John Ross (British Army officer, died 1843), lieutenant governor of Guernsey
- John Buchan Ross (1912–2009), British Royal Air Force officer
- John Ross (RNZN officer) (1916–1983), admiral of the Royal New Zealand Navy
- Jack Ross (Australian soldier) (John Campbell Ross, 1899–2009), Australian veteran of the First World War
- John H. Ross (1918–2013), pilot during World War II

== Politics ==
- John Ross (Cherokee chief) (1790–1866), principal chief of the Cherokee Nation
- John Ross (Canadian politician) (1818–1871), Canadian senator from Ontario
- John Sylvester Ross (1821–1882), miller and political figure in Ontario
- John Ross (Nova Scotia politician) (1822–1892), political figure in Nova Scotia, Canada
- John Jones Ross (1831–1901), Canadian politician from Quebec
- J. Gordon Ross (1891–1972), Liberal party member of the Canadian House of Commons
- John Ross (New South Wales politician) (1891–1973), member of the New South Wales Legislative Assembly
- John Ross (Pennsylvania politician) (1770–1834), U.S. representative from Pennsylvania
- J. R. Campbell (communist) (1894–1969), British communist activist and newspaper editor
- John N. Ross (1920–2011), Irish solicitor and politician
- John Ross (activist) (1938–2011), American author, journalist, and activist
- John Ross (Victorian politician) (1940–2003), member of the Victorian Legislative Council
- Jack Ross (Arizona politician) (1927–2013), Arizona car dealer, philanthropist and politician
- John Q. Ross (1873–1922), lieutenant governor of Michigan
- John Ross (provost), lord provost in Aberdeen, Scotland, 1710–1712

== Religion ==
- John Ross (bishop of Carlisle) (died 1332), English bishop of Carlisle
- John Ross (bishop of Exeter) (1719–1792), English bishop of Exeter
- John Ross (missionary) (1842–1915), Scottish missionary to Northeast China

== Sports ==
- John Ross (American football) (born 1995), American football player
- John Ross (curler) (born 1938), Canadian curler
- Jack Ross (footballer, born 1892) (1892–1973), Australian rules footballer for Geelong between 1920 and 1922
- Jack Ross (footballer, born 1895) (1895–1943), Australian rules footballer for Geelong in 1919
- Jack Ross (footballer, born 1911) (1911–1996), Australian rules footballer for Collingwood
- Jack Ross (footballer, born 2000), Australian rules footballer for Richmond
- Jack Ross (footballer, born 1976), Scottish professional footballer
- Jock Ross (1920s footballer) (John Ross), Scottish footballer
- John Ross (rower) (1945–2009), Canadian rower in the 1968 Summer Olympics
- John Ross (rugby union) (born 1967), Australian rugby player
- Jock Ross (rugby union) (John Charles Ross, born 1949), New Zealand rugby union player
- Johnny Ross (rugby league) (1931–2018), Australian rugby league player
- John Ross (runner) (1931–2022), Canadian Olympic athlete
- John Ross (tennis) (born 1964), professional tennis player

== Other ==
- John Ross, 1st Lord Ross (died 1501), Scottish nobleman
- John Ross, 2nd Lord Ross (died 1513), Scottish nobleman
- John Ross (explorer) (1817–1903), explorer of Central Australia
- Charles Rawden Maclean (1815–1880), known as John Ross, sea captain and opponent of slavery
- John W. Ross (Iowa architect) (1830–1914), architect in Davenport, Iowa
- John W. Ross (North Dakota architect) (1848–1914), architect in Grand Forks, North Dakota
- John Ross (businessman) (1840–1876), Scottish retail businessman
- J. K. L. Ross (1876–1951), Canadian industrialist from Montreal
- John Ross (chemist) (1926–2017), American physical chemist
- John R. Ross (1938–2025), American linguist
- John Ross (blogger) (fl. 1980s), British far-left blogger
- John Merry Ross (1833–1883), Scottish academic author and teacher

== See also ==
- John Ross House (disambiguation)
- S. John Ross (disambiguation)
