= Ross House =

Ross House may refer to:

== Australia ==
- Ross House, Melbourne, a heritage-listed office building on Flinders Lane, Melbourne city centre, Victoria
- Ross House, Kew, a heritage-listed house in Kew, Melbourne, Victoria

== South Africa ==
- John Ross House (Durban), a skyscraper

== United States ==
- John M. Ross House, a National Register of Historic Places listing in Phoenix, Arizona
- Ross House (Echo Park, Los Angeles), a Los Angeles Historic-Cultural Monument in Silver Lake, Angelino Heights, and Echo Park
- Ross House (San Jose, California)
- Edgar and Rachel Ross House, Seaford, Delaware
- Gov. William H. Ross House, Seaford, Delaware
- John Ross House (Rossville, Georgia)
- Joseph Ross House, Rochester, Illinois
- Harvey Lee Ross House, Vermont, Illinois
- David M. Ross House, a house in the Iron County MRA, Crystal Falls, Michigan
- John Ross House (Branson, Missouri)
- Ross House (Mexico, Missouri)
- Nimrod Ross House, a National Register of Historic Places listings in Lancaster County, Nebraska
- Dr. Robert M. Ross House, Artesia, New Mexico
- Moses Ross House, Doe Run Valley, Pennsylvania
- Dr. James A. Ross House, Pikeville, Tennessee

== See also ==
- John Ross House (disambiguation)
- Ross-Averill House, a National Register of Historic Places listing in Linn County, Oregon
- Ross Farm (disambiguation)
- Ross-Gowdy House, a National Register of Historic Places listing in Clermont County, Ohio
- Ross-Hand Mansion, South Nyack, New York
- Ross-Sewell House, Jackson, Tennessee
- Sibella Ross (1840–1929), New Zealand schoolteacher who ran a school called Ross House
