= Jonathan Ross (disambiguation) =

Jonathan Ross (born 1960) is an English television and radio personality.

Jonathan or Jon Ross may also refer to:

- Jonathan Ross (politician) (1826–1905), United States senator, justice of the Vermont Supreme Court
- Jonny Ross, Irish bowls player
- Jonny Ross, 1960s UK singer who covered "Silent Voices"
- Jon Ross (writer), writer for television shows such as Lucky Louie
- John Rossiter (novelist) (1916–2005), British writer of detective fiction under the pseudonym Jonathan Ross
- The Jonathan Ross Show, a British chat show presented by the TV personality
- Jonathan Todd Ross (born 1979), actor and writer
- Jonathan Ross, United States Immigration and Customs Enforcement agent who killed Renée Good

== See also ==
- John Ross (disambiguation)
- Jonathon Ross (disambiguation)
