= John Ross House =

John Ross House may refer to:

- John Ross House (Rossville, Georgia), listed on the NRHP in Georgia
- John Ross House (Branson, Missouri), listed on the NRHP in Taney County, Missouri
- John Ross House (Durban, South Africa), a skyscraper

== See also ==
- Ross House (disambiguation)
- John Ross (disambiguation)
