= Jonathon Ross =

Jonathon Ross may refer to:

- Jonathon Ross (footballer) (born 1973), Australian rules footballer
- Jonathan Ross (born 1960), English television and radio personality

== See also ==
- John Ross (disambiguation)
- Jonathan Ross (disambiguation)
