= Keith Reilly =

Canadian curler

- Curler
- Born: 1938; Ochre River, Manitoba
- Died: December 18, 2012 (aged 73–74); Toronto, Ontario

Curling career
- Member Association: Ontario
- Brier: 1 (1967)
- World Championship: 1 (1967)
Medal record
Representing Canada
World Curling Championships
Bronze medal – third place	1967 Perth
Representing Ontario
Macdonald Brier
Gold medal – first place	1967 Hull

Keith Allen "Wheels" Reilly (1938 – December 18, 2012) was a Canadian curler.

Reilly played lead for Alf Phillips, Jr. at the 1967 Macdonald Brier. It was Reilly's lone Brier appearance, but the rink won, earning the right to represent Canada at the 1967 Scotch Cup, the World Championships. At the Scotch Cup, the team finished the round robin in second place with a 6-1 record, but lost the semi-final match up against Scotland's Chuck Hay. This earned a bronze medal for the team.

Reilly was a teacher by profession. He would end up coaching many top teams, including Alison Goring's rink at the 1982 and 1983 provincial junior championships and the 1990 Scott Tournament of Hearts. He also coached the Japanese men's team at the 2004 Pacific Curling Championships. He would later move on to officiating curling events, and was the chief umpire at the 2010 Tim Hortons Brier, the 2011 Tim Hortons Brier, the 2009 Canadian Mixed Curling Championship, the 2002 Arctic Winter Games, 3 Canada Winter Games and at the 2010 World Senior Curling Championships. He would officiate events in every year from 1985 to 2012.

After a lengthy hospital stay, Reilly died on December 18, 2012.
