= The Man Who Came Back =

The Man Who Came Back may refer to:

== Film ==
- The Man Who Came Back (1924 film), American film directed by Emmett J. Flynn
- The Man Who Came Back (1931 film), American film
- The Man Who Came Back (2008 film), American film

== Literature ==
- The Man Who Came Back, a 1912 novel by John Fleming Wilson
- The Man Who Came Back, a 1915 play by Katharine Kavanaugh
- The Man Who Came Back, a 1916 Broadway play by Jules Eckert Goodman
- The Man Who Came Back, a 1964 novel by Lionel Fanthorpe under the pseudonym Neil Thanet
- The Man Who Came Back, a 1967 novel by Ida Pollock under the pseudonym Pamela Kent
- The Man Who Came Back, a 1978 novel by John Rossiter
- The Man Who Came Back: Essays and Short Stories, a 1991 collection of compiled works from Neil M. Gunn edited by Margery Palmer McCulloch

== Television ==
- "The Man Who Came Back", The Lone Ranger season 1, episode 17 (1950)
- "The Man Who Came Back", UFO episode 16 (1971)

== See also ==
- The Girl Who Came Back
