= Ron Manning =

Canadian curler

- Curler
- Born: 1937
- Died: April 10, 2012 (aged 74–75); Toronto

Curling career
- Member Association: Ontario
- Brier: 1 (1967)
- World Championship: 1 (1967)
Medal record
Representing Canada
World Curling Championships
| Bronze medal – third place | 1967 Perth |
Representing Ontario
Macdonald Brier
| Gold medal – first place | 1967 Hull |

Ronald Manning (1937–April 10, 2012) was a Canadian curler from Toronto. He was the second on the 1967 Macdonald Brier Champion team, representing Ontario (skipped by Alf Phillips, Jr.). The team later went on to finish third at the World Championships of that year.

== Personal life ==
Manning was married to Linda, and had two children. He died at the Toronto General Hospital in 2012.
