= John Ferron House =

Historic house in Pennsylvania, United States

- U.S. National Register of Historic Places
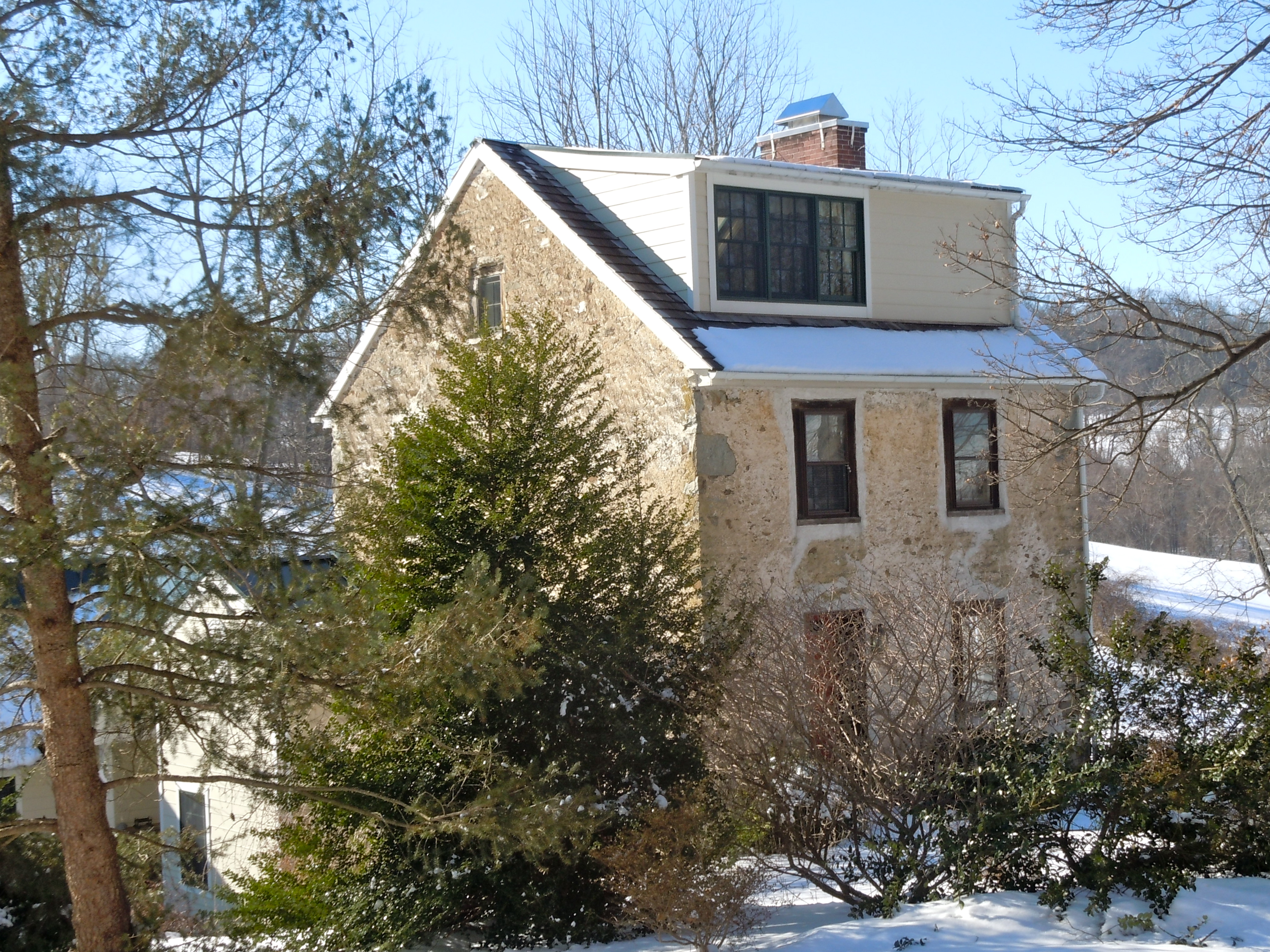
- John Ferron House, February 2011

- Location within Pennsylvania Location within the United States
- Location: Saint Malachi Rd., Londonderry Township, Pennsylvania
- Coordinates: 39°53′57″N 75°51′06″W
- Area: 10.8 acres (4.4 ha)
- Built: c. 1838
- MPS: West Branch Brandywine Creek MRA
- NRHP reference No.: 85003049
- Added to NRHP: November 26, 1985

The John Ferron House is an historic home that is located in Londonderry Township, Chester County, Pennsylvania, United States. It is situated opposite St. Malachi Church, and was the property of the church's builder/carpenter, John Ferron.

It was added to the National Register of Historic Places in 1985.

== History and architectural features ==
Built circa 1838, this historic structure is a two-story, two-bay, banked stone dwelling with a gable roof. It has a shed roofed frame addition. Also located on the property is a contributing root cellar with an arched brick entry.
