= S. John Ross =

S. John Ross may refer to:

- S. John Ross (artist) (1919–2008), American born Australian artist and showman
- S. John Ross (game designer) (born 1971), American game and graphic designer and writer

== See also ==
- John Ross (disambiguation)
