= Ross Farm =

Ross Farm may refer to:

in Canada

- Ross Farm Museum, near New Ross, Nova Scotia

in the United States

- Ross Farm (Northampton, Massachusetts), listed on the NRHP in Massachusetts
- John Ross Farm, Leroy, IN, listed on the NRHP in Indiana
- Frank L. Ross Farm, North Bethlehem, PA, listed on the NRHP in Pennsylvania

== See also ==
- Ross House (disambiguation)
