= St. Malachi Church =

Historic church in Pennsylvania, United States

- U.S. National Register of Historic Places
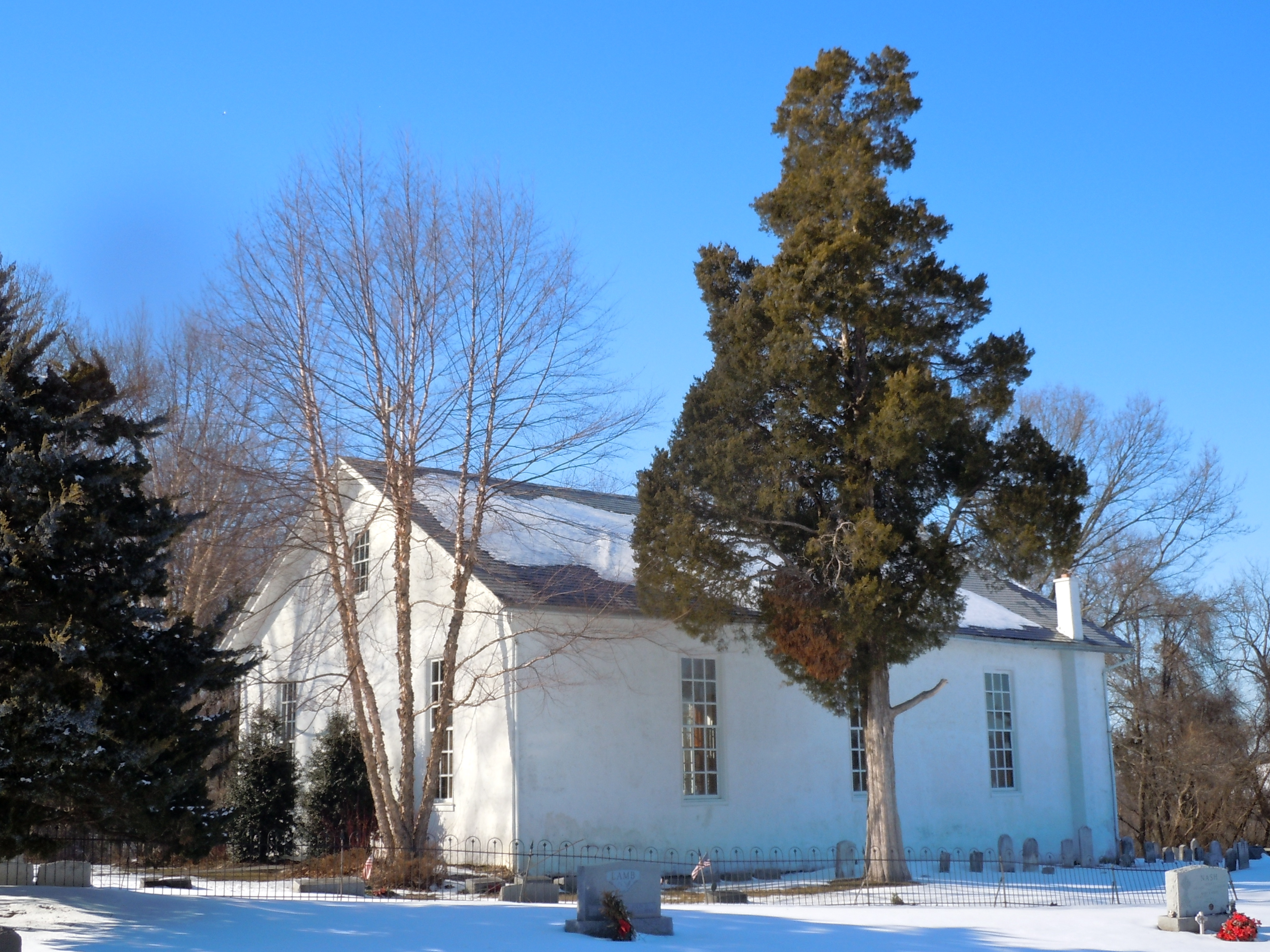

- Location within Pennsylvania Location within the United States
- Location: 76 St. Malachi Road Cochranville, PA 19330
- Coordinates: 39°53′48″N 75°50′57″W
- Area: 2 acres (0.81 ha)
- Built: 1838
- MPS: West Branch Brandywine Creek MRA
- NRHP reference No.: 85002376
- Added to NRHP: September 16, 1985

St. Malachi Church is a historic Irish Roman Catholic mission church on St. Malachi Road in rural Londonderry Township, Chester County, Pennsylvania, United States. It is a mission of Our Lady of Consolation of Parkesburg. The church with its adjoining cemetery was added to the National Register of Historic Places (NRHP) in 1985.

The church is remarkable for its simplicity, resembling a Quaker meeting house more than a Catholic parish church. It is a rectangular one story stone stucco-covered building.

== History ==
The church has never had a resident priest, remaining a mission since its founding. Early services were conducted by visiting missionaries. In 1840 it became a mission church of St. Agnes Church in West Chester according to the NRHP nomination form. Later it was a mission of parishes in Parkesburg and Coatesville.

The congregation was founded in the eighteenth century. The earliest standing tombstone bears the date 1771 and marks the grave of Thomas Maguire. The land was donated to the church in 1794 by Andrew Maguire. An attempt to build a church started in 1800. The building was completed in 1838 next to the cemetery on the Maguire farm. John Ferron, owner of the NRHP-listed John Ferron House, was the carpenter for the church. Henry Ferron and the Maguire family were the stone masons.

Major improvements were made to the building in 1865, and again in 1937, in preparation for the church's centennial. Electricity and central heating were installed sometime after 1973. In the early 1990s major roof repairs were made, air conditioning was added and a port-a-potty was brought in. Indoor plumbing was added later.

The first mass was celebrated on January 1, 1839 by Father James A. Miller. The first pastor, Father Bernard McCabe, was soon appointed and he also served missions in Coatesville, about seven miles north of the church, and Parkesburg, about eight miles northwest. The first confirmation was conferred in 1843 by Bishop Francis Kenrick. St. John Neumann conferred another confirmation in 1854. In 1853 the Seven Dolors church, now Our Lady of Consolation, was built in Parkesburg, and St. Malachi became a mission of Seven Dolors. Between 1871 and 1902 both Seven Dolors and St. Malachi were missions of St. Cecilia’s in Coatesville. In 1902 Seven Dolors again became a self-supporting parish and served the mission of St. Malachi.

Services at St. Malachi had been celebrated irregularly in the 1930s and 1940s and starting in 1952 were scheduled only three or four times annually. Starting in 1963 services were scheduled monthly and beginning in 1973, weekly.

The church is unusual in Chester County, an early stronghold of Quakerism in the Quaker colony of Pennsylvania. Irish had settled in the area before 1730, but they were Presbyterians and Quakers. About 1730 Presbyterians established a well-known church and religious school at Faggs Manor about five miles southwest of St. Malachi. In 1757 there were only 55 Irish Catholics (32 male, 23 female) counted in Chester County.
