= Londonderry Township, Chester County, Pennsylvania =

Township in Pennsylvania, US

Londonderry Township
- Township
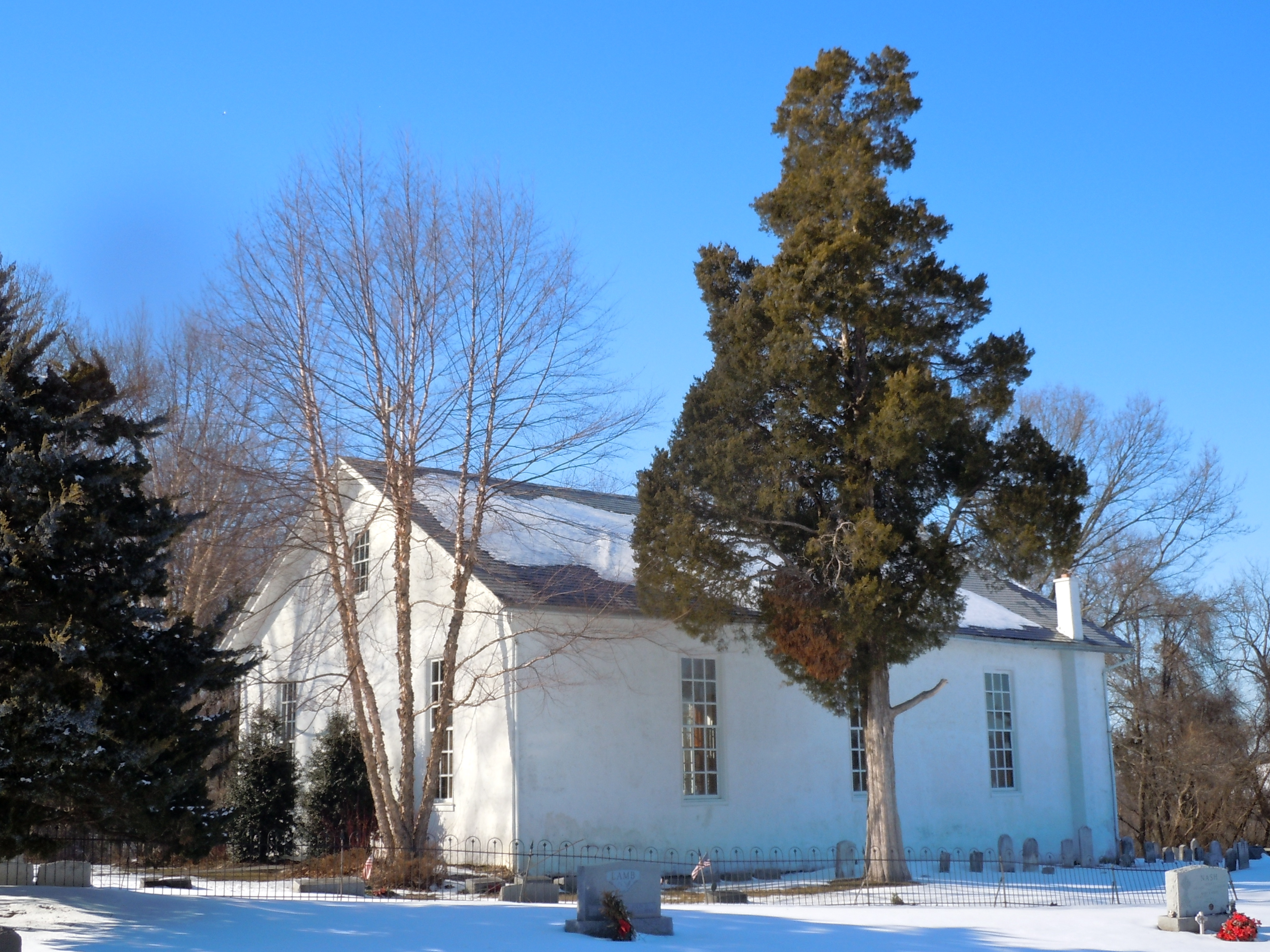
- St. Malachi Church in Londonderry Township

- Location of Londonderry Township in Chester County, Pennsylvania (left) and of Chester County in Pennsylvania (right)

- Location of Pennsylvania in the United States
- Coordinates: 39°52′31″N 75°52′25″W
- Country: United States
- State: Pennsylvania
- County: Chester

Area
  - Total: 11.36 sq mi (29.42 km^{2})
  - Land: 11.31 sq mi (29.30 km^{2})
  - Water: 0.046 sq mi (0.12 km^{2})
- Elevation: 600 ft (180 m)

Population (2010)
  - Total: 2,149
  - Estimate (2016): 2,426
  - Density: 214/sq mi (82.8/km^{2})
- Time zone: UTC-5 (EST)
  - Summer (DST): UTC-4 (EDT)
- Area code: 610
- FIPS code: 42-029-44456
- Website: www.londonderrytownship.org

Londonderry Township is a township in Chester County, Pennsylvania, United States. The population was 2,149 at the 2010 census.

== History ==
In 1682, William Penn deeded 50,000 acres in what is now Londonderry Township to his relative John Fagg. It eventually developed into the crossroads community of Faggs Manor, Pennsylvania. Londonderry Township was officially created in 1734 when its Scotch-Irish immigrant residents voted to secede from Nottingham Township. It is named after the city of Londonderry, in present-day Northern Ireland.

The township was profiled in a 2007 book, Last Harvest: How a Cornfield Became New Daleville by Witold Rybczynski, who divided the population into four types: farmers, who made up only 10 percent of the population; large wealthy landowners, who make up another 10 percent and often raise horses; old suburbanites; and new suburbanites. The old suburbanites and new suburbanites have little in common but both oppose new development in the township.

The John Ferron House, Moses Ross House, and St. Malachi Church are listed on the National Register of Historic Places.

== Geography ==
According to the U.S. Census Bureau, the township has a total area of 11.3 square miles (29 km^{2}), of which 0.09% is water.

== Demographics ==
Historical population
Census	Pop.	Note	%±
1930	491		—
1940	471		−4.1%
1950	595		26.3%
1960	718		20.7%
1970	920		28.1%
1980	1,293		40.5%
1990	1,243		−3.9%
2000	1,632		31.3%
2010	2,149		31.7%
2020	2,476		15.2%

At the 2010 census, the township was 91.1% non-Hispanic White, 1.0% Black or African American, 0.8% Asian, and 1.0% were two or more races. 6.2% of the population was of Hispanic or Latino ancestry.

As of the 2000 census, there were 1,632 people, 525 households, and 410 families living in the township. The population density was 144.0 inhabitants per square mile (55.6/km^{2}). There were 539 housing units at an average density of 47.6 per square mile (18.4/km^{2}). The racial makeup of the township was 95.53% White, 1.23% African American, 0.55% Asian, 2.27% from other races, and 0.43% from two or more races. Hispanic or Latino of any race were 9.31% of the population.

There were 525 households, out of which 37.5% had children under the age of 18 living with them, 65.7% were married couples living together, 8.6% had a female householder with no husband present, and 21.9% were non-families. 18.1% of all households were made up of individuals, and 6.1% had someone living alone who was 65 years of age or older. The average household size was 2.91, and the average family size was 3.33.

In Londonderry Township, the population was spread out, with 28.2% under the age of 18, 6.2% from 18 to 24, 31.5% from 25 to 44, 26.4% from 45 to 64, and 7.7% who were 65 years of age or older. The median age was 37 years. For every 100 females there were 106.3 males. For every 100 females, age 18 and over, there were 109.5 males.

The median income for a household in the township was $54,750, and the median income for a family was $59,911. Males had a median income of $31,618 versus $31,413 for females. The per capita income for the township was $21,773. About 6.4% of families and 8.2% of the population were below the poverty line, including 12.1% of those under age 18 and 10.9% of those age 65 or over.

== Transportation ==
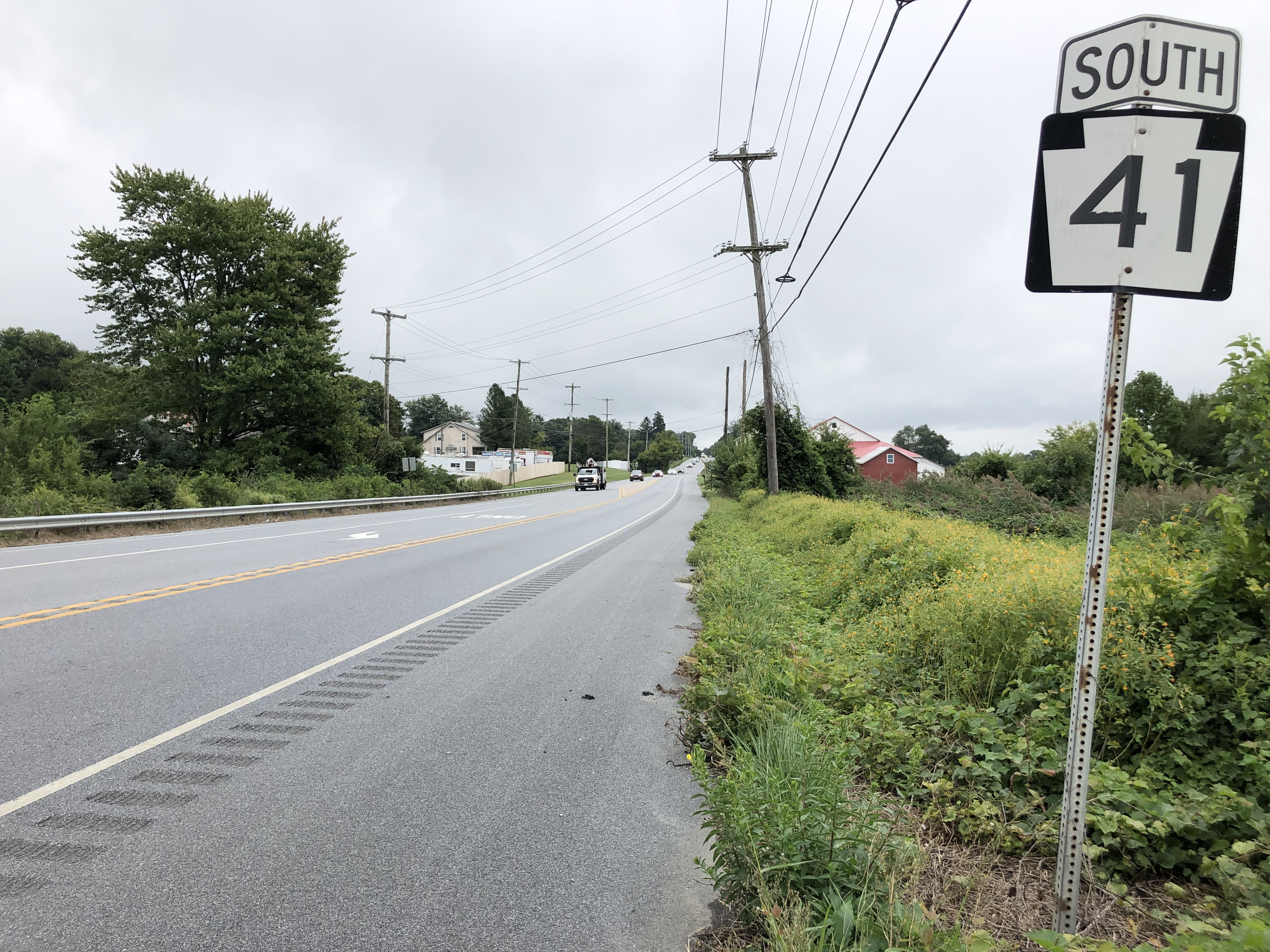
PA 41 southbound in Londonderry Township

As of 2020, there were 35.33 miles (56.86 km) of public roads in Londonderry Township, of which 17.50 miles (28.16 km) were maintained by the Pennsylvania Department of Transportation (PennDOT) and 17.83 miles (28.69 km) were maintained by the township.

Pennsylvania Route 41, Pennsylvania Route 796, and Pennsylvania Route 926 are the numbered highways serving Londonderry Township. PA 41 follows Gap Newport Pike along a northwest–southeast alignment through the central portion of the township. PA 796 heads south from PA 41 along Jennersville Road through the southern portion of the township. Finally, PA 926 follows Street Road along a southwest–northeast alignment through the southern and central portions of the township.

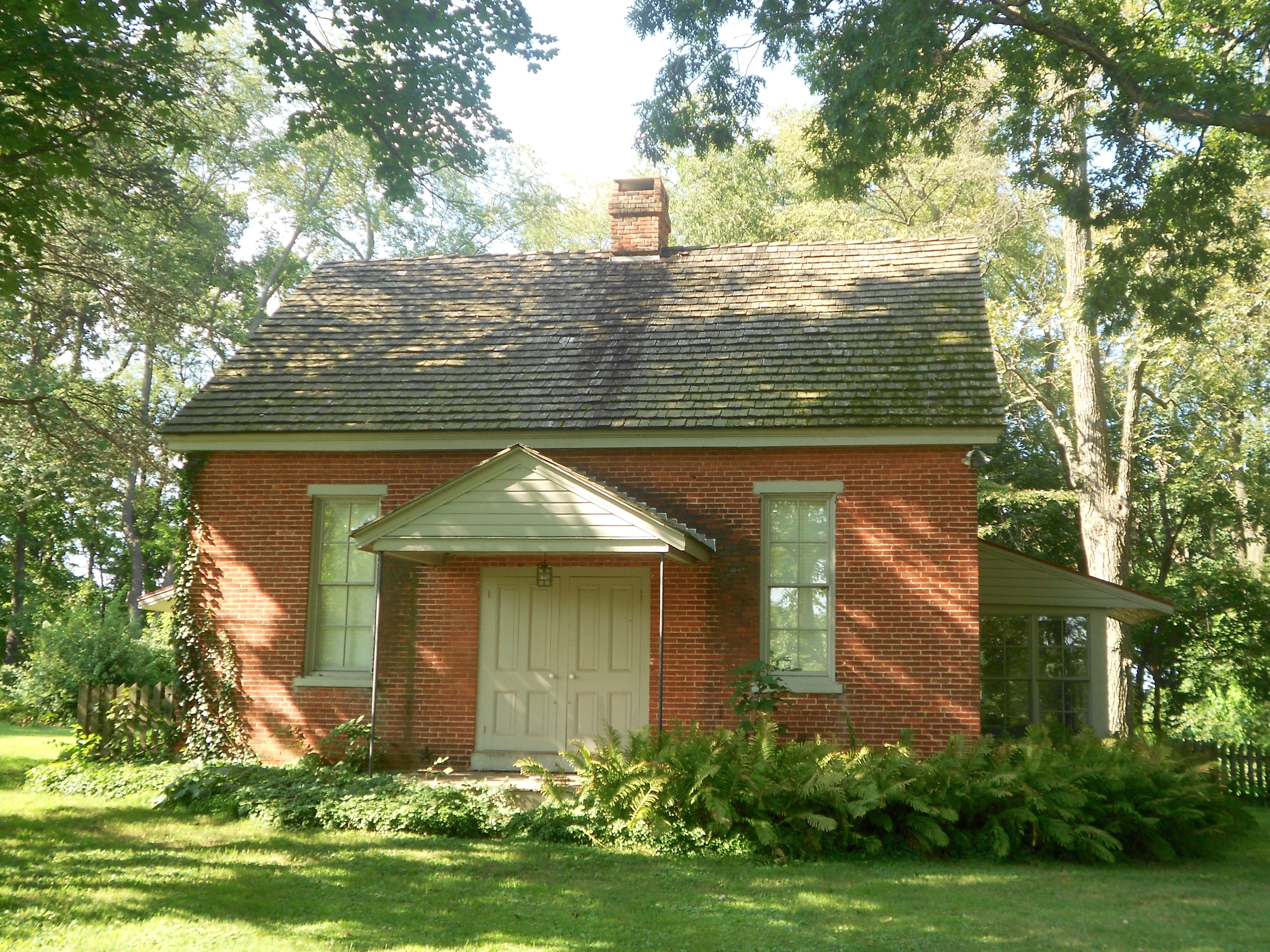
Doe Run Friends Meeting House

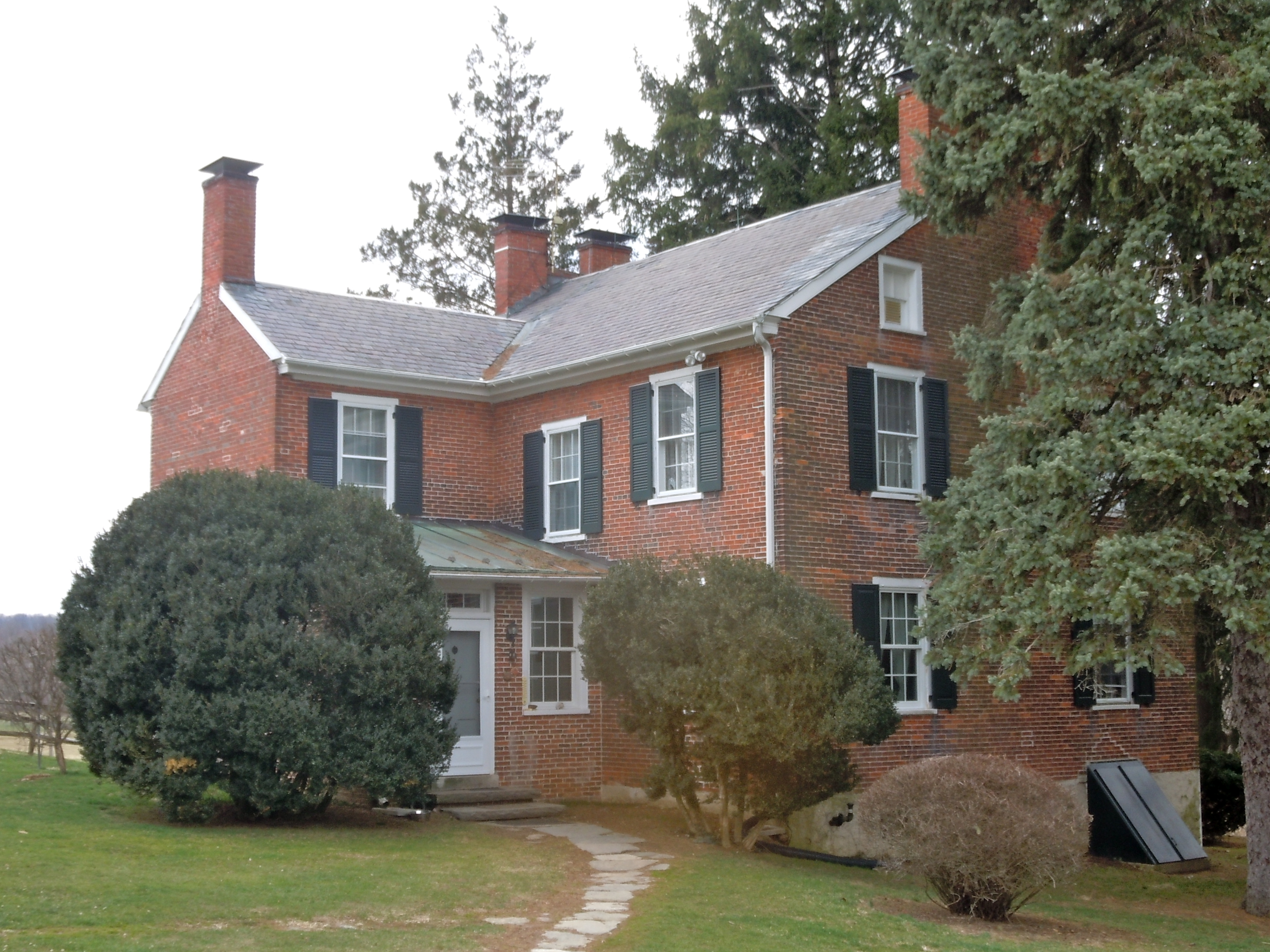
Moses Ross House

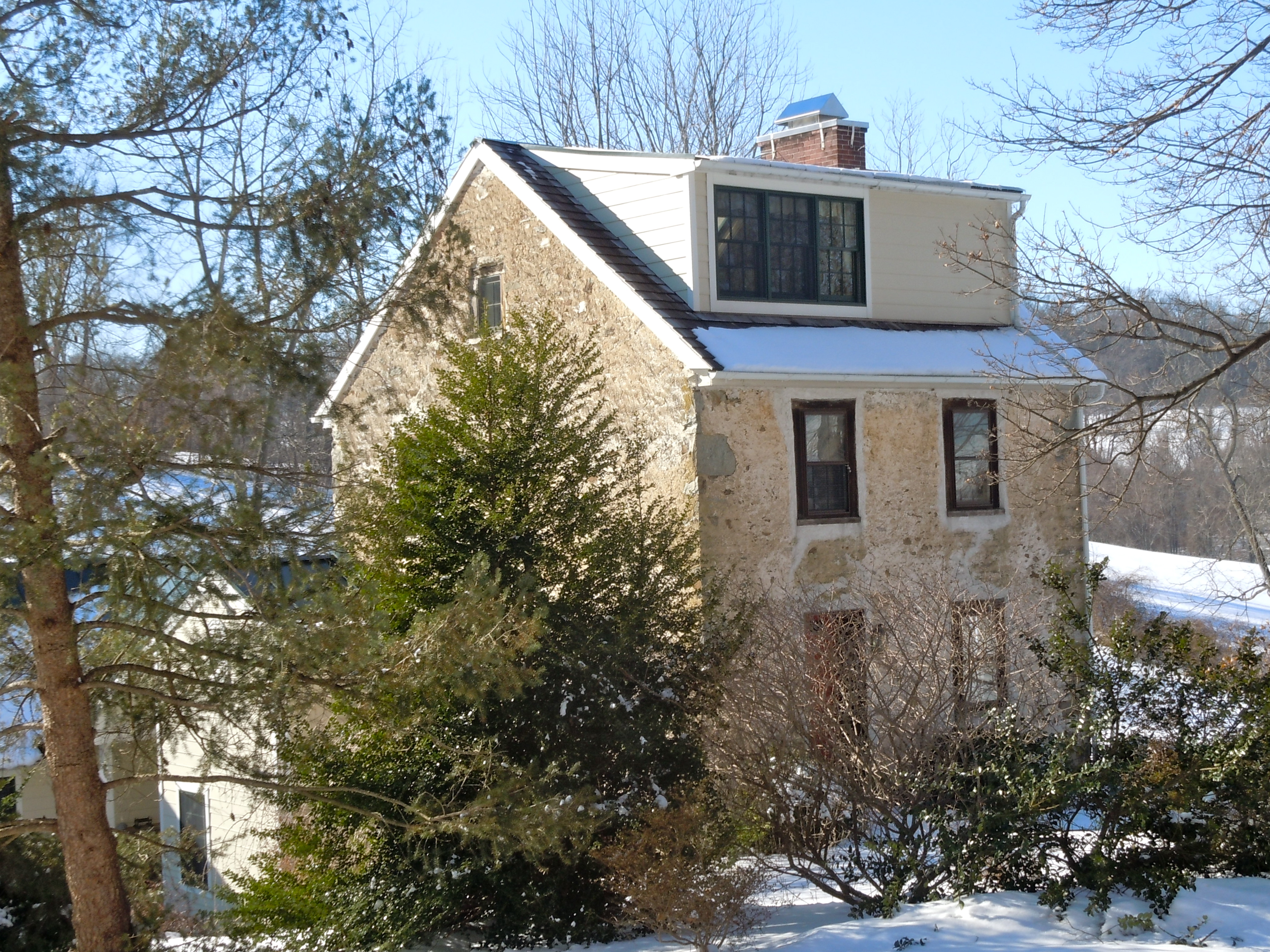
John Ferron House

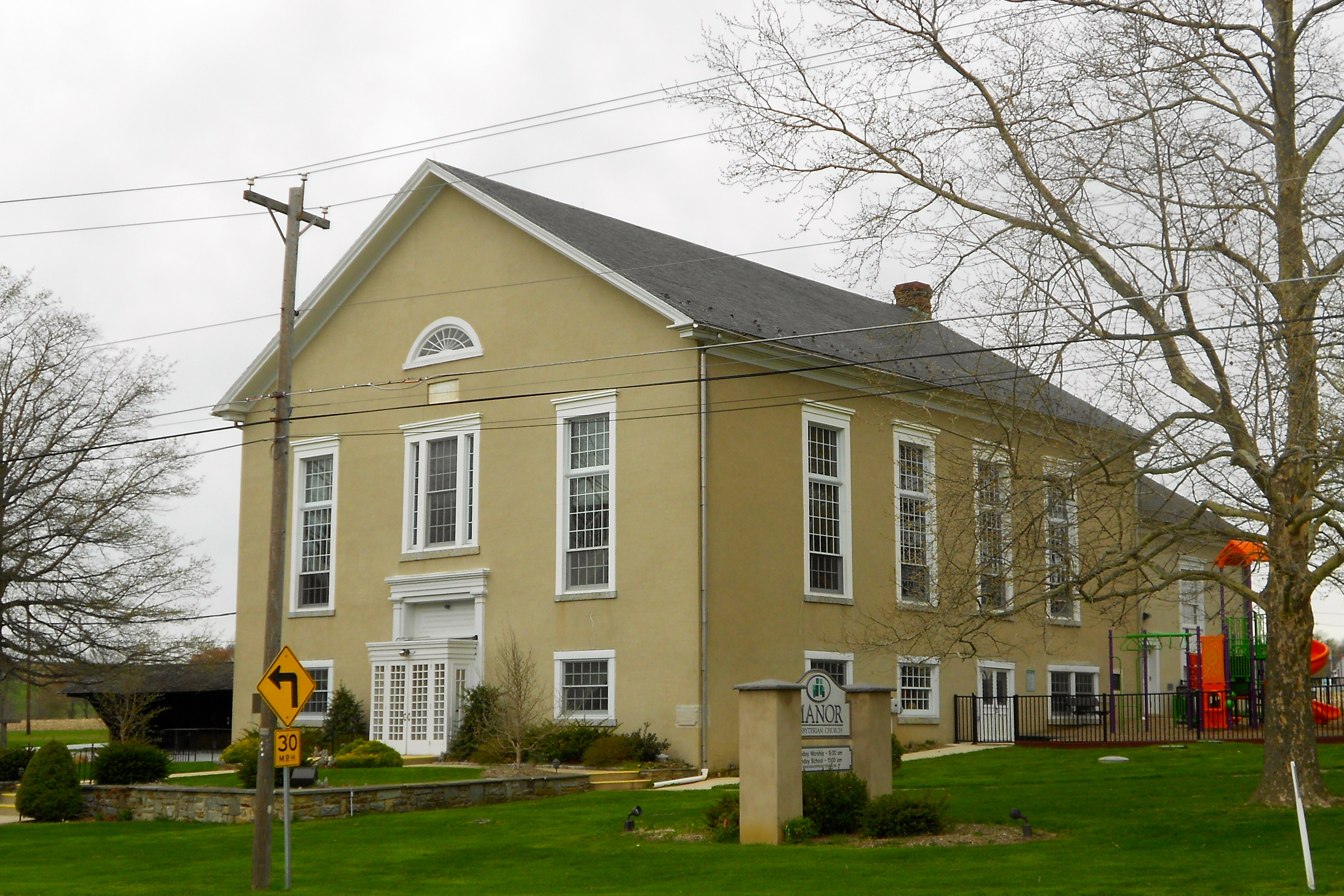
Faggs Manor Presbyterian Church
