= 1967 Macdonald Brier =

- Host city: Hull, Quebec
- Arena: Hull Arena
- Dates: March 6–10
- Attendance: 26,174
- Winner: Ontario
- Curling club: Parkway CC, Toronto
- Skip: Alf Phillips Jr.
- Third: John Ross
- Second: Ron Manning
- Lead: Keith Reilly

The 1967 Macdonald Brier, Canada's national men's curling championship was held March 6–10 at the Hull Arena in Hull, Quebec. The event was originally planned to be played at the Ottawa Civic Centre in Ottawa, but it was later decided to hold the event across the Ottawa River in Hull, as the Civic Centre was not going to be completed in time to host the event.

In the "Centennial" Brier, Team Ontario, skipped by 28 year old "Alfie" Phillips Jr., captured the Brier Tankard by finishing round robin play with a 9–1 record. This was Ontario's third Brier championship and their first since 1939. This would also Phillips' only career Brier appearance. Manitoba and Saskatchewan finished tied for runner-up with 8–2 records as Manitoba defeated Saskatchewan in the final draw preventing a tiebreaker playoff.

Phillips' rink would go onto represent Canada at the 1967 Scotch Cup, which they took third.

== Teams ==
The teams are listed as follows:

| Alberta | British Columbia | Manitoba | New Brunswick |
|---|---|---|---|
| Calgary CC, Calgary Skip: Ron Northcott; Third: George Fink; Second: Bernie Sparkes; Lead: Fred Storey | Trail CC, Trail Skip: Buzz McGibney; Third: Johnny Cameron; Second: Tom Feeney; Lead: Doug Feeney | Strathcona CC, Winnipeg Skip: Bruce Hudson; Third: Richard Wright; Second: Gordon Little; Lead: Harold Martel | St. Andrews CC, Saint John Skip: Charlie Sullivan Sr. Third: Dave Sullivan; Second: Robert Devine; Lead: Robert Arseneau |
| Newfoundland | Northern Ontario | Nova Scotia | Ontario |
| RCAF Goose Bay CC, Goose Bay Skip: Leonard Kalchak; Third: Douglas Ellis; Second: John Strugnell; Lead: Duane Olson | Cobalt-Haileybury CC, Haileybury Skip: Bill Grozelle; Third: Bob Grozelle; Second: Jack Dunn; Lead: George McIllwaine | Mayflower CC, Halifax Skip: Ron Franklin; Third: Cork Corkum; Second: John Oyler; Lead: John Hawkins | Parkway CC, Toronto Skip: Alf Phillips Jr. Third: John Ross; Second: Ron Manning; Lead: Keith Reilly |
| Prince Edward Island | Quebec | Saskatchewan |
| Montague CC, Montague Skip: Ken MacDonald; Third: Ken MacKenzie; Second: Paul DesRoches; Lead: Jack Murphy | Glenmore CC, Dollard-des-Ormeaux Skip: Bruce Beveridge; Third: Frederick Lunn; Second: Charles Hayes; Lead: Irvine Young | Elbow CC, Elbow Skip: Doug Wankel; Third: Art Knudson; Second: Gay Knudson; Lead: Elmer Knudson |

== Map of teams ==
Provincial Winners

== Round robin standings ==
Key
| Brier champion |

| Province | Skip | W | L | PF | PA |
|---|---|---|---|---|---|
| Ontario | Alf Phillips Jr. | 9 | 1 | 106 | 73 |
| Manitoba | Bruce Hudson | 8 | 2 | 89 | 64 |
| Saskatchewan | Doug Wankel | 8 | 2 | 98 | 60 |
| Alberta | Ron Northcott | 7 | 3 | 87 | 61 |
| British Columbia | Buzz McGibney | 5 | 5 | 89 | 83 |
| Quebec | Bruce Beveridge | 4 | 6 | 76 | 99 |
| Nova Scotia | Ron Franklin | 4 | 6 | 87 | 100 |
| Prince Edward Island | Ken MacDonald | 3 | 7 | 67 | 86 |
| Northern Ontario | Bill Grozelle | 3 | 7 | 75 | 83 |
| Newfoundland | Leonard Kalchak | 3 | 7 | 70 | 95 |
| New Brunswick | Charlie Sullivan Sr. | 1 | 9 | 64 | 104 |

== Round robin results ==
=== Draw 1 ===
| Team | 1 | 2 | 3 | 4 | 5 | 6 | 7 | 8 | 9 | 10 | 11 | 12 | Final |
| Ontario (Phillips) | 0 | 0 | 1 | 0 | 1 | 0 | 1 | 0 | 1 | 0 | 3 | 0 | 7 |
| Manitoba (Hudson) | 1 | 0 | 0 | 1 | 0 | 1 | 0 | 3 | 0 | 2 | 0 | 1 | 9 |

| Team | 1 | 2 | 3 | 4 | 5 | 6 | 7 | 8 | 9 | 10 | 11 | 12 | Final |
| (Newfoundland and Labrador) Newfoundland (Kalchak) | 0 | 0 | 1 | 0 | 1 | 0 | 0 | 1 | 0 | 0 | 1 | 0 | 4 |
| Northern Ontario (Grozelle) | 2 | 0 | 0 | 3 | 0 | 1 | 1 | 0 | 1 | 1 | 0 | 1 | 10 |

| Team | 1 | 2 | 3 | 4 | 5 | 6 | 7 | 8 | 9 | 10 | 11 | 12 | Final |
| New Brunswick (Sullivan) | 0 | 0 | 0 | 1 | 0 | 0 | 0 | 0 | 1 | 2 | 0 | 0 | 4 |
| Alberta (Northcott) | 2 | 0 | 3 | 0 | 2 | 2 | 1 | 0 | 0 | 0 | 0 | 2 | 12 |

| Team | 1 | 2 | 3 | 4 | 5 | 6 | 7 | 8 | 9 | 10 | 11 | 12 | Final |
| British Columbia (McGibney) | 1 | 0 | 2 | 0 | 2 | 0 | 3 | 4 | 0 | 1 | 0 | 1 | 14 |
| Nova Scotia (Franklin) | 0 | 1 | 0 | 1 | 0 | 1 | 0 | 0 | 3 | 0 | 1 | 0 | 7 |

| Team | 1 | 2 | 3 | 4 | 5 | 6 | 7 | 8 | 9 | 10 | 11 | 12 | Final |
| Quebec (Beveridge) | 0 | 2 | 0 | 0 | 0 | 0 | 0 | 1 | 0 | 0 | 1 | 0 | 4 |
| Saskatchewan (Wankel) | 1 | 0 | 0 | 2 | 1 | 1 | 0 | 0 | 1 | 1 | 0 | 4 | 11 |

=== Draw 2 ===
| Team | 1 | 2 | 3 | 4 | 5 | 6 | 7 | 8 | 9 | 10 | 11 | 12 | Final |
| British Columbia (McGibney) | 1 | 1 | 0 | 0 | 0 | 2 | 1 | 0 | 0 | 1 | 1 | 0 | 7 |
| New Brunswick (Sullivan) | 0 | 0 | 0 | 0 | 2 | 0 | 0 | 0 | 1 | 0 | 0 | 1 | 4 |

| Team | 1 | 2 | 3 | 4 | 5 | 6 | 7 | 8 | 9 | 10 | 11 | 12 | Final |
| Prince Edward Island (MacDonald) | 1 | 0 | 0 | 1 | 0 | 2 | 0 | 1 | 0 | 0 | 1 | 0 | 6 |
| Manitoba (Hudson) | 0 | 2 | 0 | 0 | 4 | 0 | 1 | 0 | 3 | 0 | 0 | 1 | 11 |

| Team | 1 | 2 | 3 | 4 | 5 | 6 | 7 | 8 | 9 | 10 | 11 | 12 | Final |
| (Newfoundland and Labrador) Newfoundland (Kalchak) | 0 | 0 | 1 | 0 | 0 | 1 | 0 | 0 | 1 | 0 | 0 | 2 | 5 |
| Alberta (Northcott) | 1 | 0 | 0 | 2 | 0 | 0 | 1 | 0 | 0 | 1 | 2 | 0 | 7 |

| Team | 1 | 2 | 3 | 4 | 5 | 6 | 7 | 8 | 9 | 10 | 11 | 12 | Final |
| Northern Ontario (Grozelle) | 1 | 0 | 1 | 0 | 1 | 0 | 1 | 0 | 2 | 0 | 1 | 1 | 8 |
| Saskatchewan (Wankel) | 0 | 1 | 0 | 3 | 0 | 5 | 0 | 2 | 0 | 1 | 0 | 0 | 12 |

| Team | 1 | 2 | 3 | 4 | 5 | 6 | 7 | 8 | 9 | 10 | 11 | 12 | 13 | Final |
| Quebec (Beveridge) | 2 | 0 | 0 | 1 | 1 | 0 | 2 | 0 | 0 | 1 | 0 | 1 | 0 | 8 |
| Ontario (Phillips) | 0 | 1 | 2 | 0 | 0 | 2 | 0 | 1 | 1 | 0 | 1 | 0 | 1 | 9 |

=== Draw 3 ===
| Team | 1 | 2 | 3 | 4 | 5 | 6 | 7 | 8 | 9 | 10 | 11 | 12 | Final |
| Ontario (Phillips) | 3 | 0 | 3 | 0 | 3 | 0 | 2 | 0 | 0 | 3 | 0 | 0 | 14 |
| New Brunswick (Sullivan) | 0 | 1 | 0 | 1 | 0 | 2 | 0 | 1 | 1 | 0 | 0 | 1 | 7 |

| Team | 1 | 2 | 3 | 4 | 5 | 6 | 7 | 8 | 9 | 10 | 11 | 12 | Final |
| British Columbia (McGibney) | 1 | 2 | 0 | 1 | 0 | 0 | 3 | 0 | 2 | 0 | 1 | 0 | 10 |
| Manitoba (Hudson) | 0 | 0 | 4 | 0 | 2 | 0 | 0 | 1 | 0 | 3 | 0 | 1 | 11 |

| Team | 1 | 2 | 3 | 4 | 5 | 6 | 7 | 8 | 9 | 10 | 11 | 12 | Final |
| Quebec (Beveridge) | 0 | 0 | 2 | 0 | 0 | 1 | 0 | 0 | 1 | 0 | 0 | 1 | 5 |
| Alberta (Northcott) | 1 | 1 | 0 | 2 | 1 | 0 | 2 | 0 | 0 | 2 | 2 | 0 | 11 |

| Team | 1 | 2 | 3 | 4 | 5 | 6 | 7 | 8 | 9 | 10 | 11 | 12 | Final |
| Prince Edward Island (MacDonald) | 1 | 0 | 2 | 0 | 1 | 0 | 1 | 2 | 0 | 2 | 0 | 2 | 11 |
| Nova Scotia (Franklin) | 0 | 1 | 0 | 4 | 0 | 3 | 0 | 0 | 1 | 0 | 1 | 0 | 10 |

| Team | 1 | 2 | 3 | 4 | 5 | 6 | 7 | 8 | 9 | 10 | 11 | 12 | Final |
| (Newfoundland and Labrador) Newfoundland (Kalchak) | 0 | 0 | 2 | 1 | 0 | 1 | 0 | 0 | 2 | 0 | 0 | 2 | 8 |
| Saskatchewan (Wankel) | 2 | 3 | 0 | 0 | 1 | 0 | 1 | 1 | 0 | 2 | 0 | 0 | 10 |

=== Draw 4 ===
| Team | 1 | 2 | 3 | 4 | 5 | 6 | 7 | 8 | 9 | 10 | 11 | 12 | Final |
| (Newfoundland and Labrador) Newfoundland (Kalchak) | 2 | 0 | 0 | 0 | 0 | 2 | 0 | 1 | 0 | 0 | 1 | 1 | 7 |
| Ontario (Phillips) | 0 | 2 | 5 | 1 | 2 | 0 | 2 | 0 | 3 | 2 | 0 | 0 | 17 |

| Team | 1 | 2 | 3 | 4 | 5 | 6 | 7 | 8 | 9 | 10 | 11 | 12 | Final |
| British Columbia (McGibney) | 1 | 0 | 3 | 1 | 1 | 2 | 0 | 3 | 0 | 1 | 1 | 0 | 13 |
| Quebec (Beveridge) | 0 | 2 | 0 | 0 | 0 | 0 | 4 | 0 | 1 | 0 | 0 | 1 | 8 |

| Team | 1 | 2 | 3 | 4 | 5 | 6 | 7 | 8 | 9 | 10 | 11 | 12 | Final |
| Prince Edward Island (MacDonald) | 1 | 0 | 0 | 2 | 0 | 0 | 1 | 0 | 0 | 0 | 2 | 0 | 6 |
| New Brunswick (Sullivan) | 0 | 1 | 0 | 0 | 0 | 1 | 0 | 2 | 1 | 1 | 0 | 1 | 7 |

| Team | 1 | 2 | 3 | 4 | 5 | 6 | 7 | 8 | 9 | 10 | 11 | 12 | Final |
| Northern Ontario (Grozelle) | 0 | 1 | 0 | 1 | 0 | 1 | 1 | 0 | 0 | 1 | 1 | 1 | 7 |
| Alberta (Northcott) | 0 | 0 | 4 | 0 | 2 | 0 | 0 | 1 | 2 | 0 | 0 | 0 | 9 |

| Team | 1 | 2 | 3 | 4 | 5 | 6 | 7 | 8 | 9 | 10 | 11 | 12 | Final |
| Nova Scotia (Franklin) | 0 | 0 | 2 | 0 | 0 | 1 | 0 | 2 | 3 | 1 | 0 | 1 | 10 |
| Manitoba (Hudson) | 0 | 0 | 0 | 1 | 2 | 0 | 1 | 0 | 0 | 0 | 1 | 0 | 5 |

=== Draw 5 ===
| Team | 1 | 2 | 3 | 4 | 5 | 6 | 7 | 8 | 9 | 10 | 11 | 12 | Final |
| Manitoba (Hudson) | 3 | 0 | 1 | 1 | 0 | 2 | 0 | 2 | 0 | 1 | 1 | 0 | 11 |
| New Brunswick (Sullivan) | 0 | 0 | 0 | 0 | 0 | 0 | 1 | 0 | 1 | 0 | 0 | 1 | 3 |

| Team | 1 | 2 | 3 | 4 | 5 | 6 | 7 | 8 | 9 | 10 | 11 | 12 | Final |
| Prince Edward Island (MacDonald) | 0 | 0 | 1 | 2 | 0 | 1 | 2 | 0 | 0 | 1 | 0 | 2 | 9 |
| (Newfoundland and Labrador) Newfoundland (Kalchak) | 0 | 1 | 0 | 0 | 1 | 0 | 0 | 1 | 1 | 0 | 1 | 0 | 5 |

| Team | 1 | 2 | 3 | 4 | 5 | 6 | 7 | 8 | 9 | 10 | 11 | 12 | Final |
| Northern Ontario (Grozelle) | 1 | 0 | 1 | 0 | 0 | 2 | 0 | 1 | 0 | 1 | 1 | 0 | 7 |
| British Columbia (McGibney) | 0 | 1 | 0 | 2 | 1 | 0 | 2 | 0 | 2 | 0 | 0 | 1 | 9 |

| Team | 1 | 2 | 3 | 4 | 5 | 6 | 7 | 8 | 9 | 10 | 11 | 12 | Final |
| Nova Scotia (Franklin) | 1 | 2 | 0 | 0 | 0 | 1 | 1 | 1 | 0 | 2 | 0 | 0 | 8 |
| Quebec (Beveridge) | 0 | 0 | 1 | 0 | 2 | 0 | 0 | 0 | 3 | 0 | 4 | 1 | 11 |

| Team | 1 | 2 | 3 | 4 | 5 | 6 | 7 | 8 | 9 | 10 | 11 | 12 | Final |
| Saskatchewan (Wankel) | 0 | 0 | 0 | 2 | 0 | 2 | 0 | 1 | 0 | 2 | 0 | 0 | 7 |
| Ontario (Phillips) | 1 | 1 | 1 | 0 | 1 | 0 | 2 | 0 | 1 | 0 | 0 | 2 | 9 |

=== Draw 6 ===
| Team | 1 | 2 | 3 | 4 | 5 | 6 | 7 | 8 | 9 | 10 | 11 | 12 | Final |
| Ontario (Phillips) | 1 | 2 | 1 | 2 | 0 | 2 | 0 | 2 | 0 | 1 | 0 | 1 | 12 |
| British Columbia (McGibney) | 0 | 0 | 0 | 0 | 3 | 0 | 2 | 0 | 1 | 0 | 1 | 0 | 7 |

| Team | 1 | 2 | 3 | 4 | 5 | 6 | 7 | 8 | 9 | 10 | 11 | 12 | Final |
| Alberta (Northcott) | 0 | 0 | 1 | 0 | 0 | 2 | 1 | 1 | 0 | 2 | 0 | 1 | 8 |
| Prince Edward Island (MacDonald) | 0 | 0 | 0 | 1 | 0 | 0 | 0 | 0 | 1 | 0 | 0 | 0 | 2 |

| Team | 1 | 2 | 3 | 4 | 5 | 6 | 7 | 8 | 9 | 10 | 11 | 12 | Final |
| Manitoba (Hudson) | 2 | 1 | 0 | 0 | 0 | 0 | 2 | 0 | 0 | 2 | 1 | 0 | 8 |
| Northern Ontario (Grozelle) | 0 | 0 | 0 | 1 | 0 | 1 | 0 | 1 | 2 | 0 | 0 | 1 | 6 |

| Team | 1 | 2 | 3 | 4 | 5 | 6 | 7 | 8 | 9 | 10 | 11 | 12 | Final |
| New Brunswick (Sullivan) | 0 | 0 | 2 | 0 | 1 | 0 | 3 | 0 | 1 | 0 | 2 | 0 | 9 |
| (Newfoundland and Labrador) Newfoundland (Kalchak) | 1 | 0 | 0 | 1 | 0 | 2 | 0 | 2 | 0 | 1 | 0 | 3 | 10 |

| Team | 1 | 2 | 3 | 4 | 5 | 6 | 7 | 8 | 9 | 10 | 11 | 12 | Final |
| Saskatchewan (Wankel) | 0 | 0 | 5 | 1 | 0 | 2 | 0 | 2 | 2 | 0 | 2 | 0 | 14 |
| Nova Scotia (Franklin) | 0 | 1 | 0 | 0 | 2 | 0 | 1 | 0 | 0 | 1 | 0 | 0 | 5 |

=== Draw 7 ===
| Team | 1 | 2 | 3 | 4 | 5 | 6 | 7 | 8 | 9 | 10 | 11 | 12 | Final |
| British Columbia (McGibney) | 0 | 2 | 0 | 2 | 1 | 0 | 2 | 1 | 2 | 0 | 2 | 0 | 12 |
| Prince Edward Island (MacDonald) | 2 | 0 | 2 | 0 | 0 | 1 | 0 | 0 | 0 | 2 | 0 | 1 | 8 |

| Team | 1 | 2 | 3 | 4 | 5 | 6 | 7 | 8 | 9 | 10 | 11 | 12 | Final |
| New Brunswick (Sullivan) | 0 | 0 | 0 | 1 | 0 | 0 | 1 | 0 | 1 | 0 | 2 | 0 | 5 |
| Saskatchewan (Wankel) | 2 | 2 | 3 | 0 | 2 | 2 | 0 | 1 | 0 | 2 | 0 | 1 | 15 |

| Team | 1 | 2 | 3 | 4 | 5 | 6 | 7 | 8 | 9 | 10 | 11 | 12 | Final |
| Alberta (Northcott) | 0 | 0 | 2 | 0 | 0 | 2 | 0 | 0 | 2 | 0 | 2 | 0 | 8 |
| Manitoba (Hudson) | 1 | 0 | 0 | 1 | 0 | 0 | 0 | 2 | 0 | 1 | 0 | 1 | 6 |

| Team | 1 | 2 | 3 | 4 | 5 | 6 | 7 | 8 | 9 | 10 | 11 | 12 | Final |
| Ontario (Phillips) | 1 | 0 | 2 | 0 | 1 | 0 | 2 | 0 | 0 | 2 | 0 | 1 | 9 |
| Nova Scotia (Franklin) | 0 | 2 | 0 | 1 | 0 | 2 | 0 | 1 | 1 | 0 | 1 | 0 | 8 |

| Team | 1 | 2 | 3 | 4 | 5 | 6 | 7 | 8 | 9 | 10 | 11 | 12 | 13 | Final |
| Quebec (Beveridge) | 0 | 0 | 1 | 0 | 2 | 0 | 2 | 1 | 0 | 1 | 0 | 0 | 1 | 8 |
| Northern Ontario (Grozelle) | 0 | 2 | 0 | 1 | 0 | 1 | 0 | 0 | 2 | 0 | 0 | 1 | 0 | 7 |

=== Draw 8 ===
| Team | 1 | 2 | 3 | 4 | 5 | 6 | 7 | 8 | 9 | 10 | 11 | 12 | Final |
| Northern Ontario (Grozelle) | 0 | 0 | 0 | 1 | 0 | 1 | 0 | 1 | 0 | 0 | 0 | 2 | 5 |
| Ontario (Phillips) | 2 | 1 | 3 | 0 | 2 | 0 | 1 | 0 | 0 | 0 | 1 | 0 | 10 |

| Team | 1 | 2 | 3 | 4 | 5 | 6 | 7 | 8 | 9 | 10 | 11 | 12 | Final |
| (Newfoundland and Labrador) Newfoundland (Kalchak) | 2 | 0 | 0 | 0 | 0 | 1 | 0 | 1 | 0 | 1 | 0 | 1 | 6 |
| British Columbia (McGibney) | 0 | 1 | 0 | 0 | 1 | 0 | 1 | 0 | 1 | 0 | 1 | 0 | 5 |

| Team | 1 | 2 | 3 | 4 | 5 | 6 | 7 | 8 | 9 | 10 | 11 | 12 | Final |
| Prince Edward Island (MacDonald) | 1 | 1 | 0 | 1 | 0 | 1 | 0 | 0 | 0 | 1 | 0 | 0 | 5 |
| Quebec (Beveridge) | 0 | 0 | 2 | 0 | 2 | 0 | 0 | 1 | 0 | 0 | 0 | 2 | 7 |

| Team | 1 | 2 | 3 | 4 | 5 | 6 | 7 | 8 | 9 | 10 | 11 | 12 | Final |
| Saskatchewan (Wankel) | 0 | 2 | 0 | 0 | 0 | 2 | 1 | 1 | 0 | 0 | 1 | 0 | 7 |
| Alberta (Northcott) | 0 | 0 | 1 | 0 | 1 | 0 | 0 | 0 | 0 | 1 | 0 | 2 | 5 |

| Team | 1 | 2 | 3 | 4 | 5 | 6 | 7 | 8 | 9 | 10 | 11 | 12 | Final |
| Nova Scotia (Franklin) | 3 | 0 | 0 | 1 | 0 | 1 | 0 | 2 | 0 | 0 | 2 | 0 | 9 |
| New Brunswick (Sullivan) | 0 | 3 | 0 | 0 | 1 | 0 | 2 | 0 | 0 | 1 | 0 | 1 | 8 |

=== Draw 9 ===
| Team | 1 | 2 | 3 | 4 | 5 | 6 | 7 | 8 | 9 | 10 | 11 | 12 | Final |
| Manitoba (Hudson) | 1 | 0 | 2 | 4 | 1 | 1 | 0 | 1 | 0 | 3 | 0 | 1 | 14 |
| Quebec (Beveridge) | 0 | 1 | 0 | 0 | 0 | 0 | 1 | 0 | 1 | 0 | 1 | 0 | 4 |

| Team | 1 | 2 | 3 | 4 | 5 | 6 | 7 | 8 | 9 | 10 | 11 | 12 | Final |
| Saskatchewan (Wankel) | 0 | 2 | 0 | 1 | 0 | 1 | 0 | 1 | 0 | 2 | 0 | 1 | 8 |
| British Columbia (McGibney) | 1 | 0 | 1 | 0 | 1 | 0 | 0 | 0 | 0 | 0 | 1 | 0 | 4 |

| Team | 1 | 2 | 3 | 4 | 5 | 6 | 7 | 8 | 9 | 10 | 11 | 12 | Final |
| Northern Ontario (Grozelle) | 0 | 0 | 0 | 0 | 0 | 1 | 1 | 0 | 0 | 2 | 1 | 0 | 5 |
| Prince Edward Island (MacDonald) | 1 | 1 | 1 | 1 | 1 | 0 | 0 | 1 | 1 | 0 | 0 | 0 | 7 |

| Team | 1 | 2 | 3 | 4 | 5 | 6 | 7 | 8 | 9 | 10 | 11 | 12 | Final |
| Nova Scotia (Franklin) | 1 | 0 | 2 | 0 | 1 | 0 | 3 | 1 | 0 | 2 | 0 | 2 | 12 |
| (Newfoundland and Labrador) Newfoundland (Kalchak) | 0 | 2 | 0 | 1 | 0 | 2 | 0 | 0 | 1 | 0 | 2 | 0 | 8 |

| Team | 1 | 2 | 3 | 4 | 5 | 6 | 7 | 8 | 9 | 10 | 11 | 12 | 13 | Final |
| Alberta (Northcott) | 0 | 0 | 0 | 0 | 0 | 1 | 0 | 2 | 1 | 0 | 2 | 1 | 0 | 7 |
| Ontario (Phillips) | 0 | 0 | 0 | 2 | 1 | 0 | 3 | 0 | 0 | 1 | 0 | 0 | 1 | 8 |

=== Draw 10 ===
| Team | 1 | 2 | 3 | 4 | 5 | 6 | 7 | 8 | 9 | 10 | 11 | 12 | Final |
| Alberta (Northcott) | 0 | 2 | 0 | 2 | 0 | 5 | 0 | 1 | 0 | 0 | 2 | 0 | 12 |
| British Columbia (McGibney) | 1 | 0 | 2 | 0 | 1 | 0 | 1 | 0 | 1 | 0 | 0 | 2 | 8 |

| Team | 1 | 2 | 3 | 4 | 5 | 6 | 7 | 8 | 9 | 10 | 11 | 12 | Final |
| Saskatchewan (Wankel) | 1 | 0 | 2 | 0 | 1 | 2 | 0 | 0 | 0 | 2 | 0 | 2 | 10 |
| Prince Edward Island (MacDonald) | 0 | 1 | 0 | 1 | 0 | 0 | 0 | 1 | 1 | 0 | 1 | 0 | 5 |

| Team | 1 | 2 | 3 | 4 | 5 | 6 | 7 | 8 | 9 | 10 | 11 | 12 | Final |
| Manitoba (Hudson) | 0 | 2 | 0 | 0 | 0 | 0 | 0 | 0 | 3 | 0 | 1 | 1 | 7 |
| (Newfoundland and Labrador) Newfoundland (Kalchak) | 1 | 0 | 0 | 0 | 0 | 1 | 1 | 2 | 0 | 1 | 0 | 0 | 6 |

| Team | 1 | 2 | 3 | 4 | 5 | 6 | 7 | 8 | 9 | 10 | 11 | 12 | Final |
| New Brunswick (Sullivan) | 1 | 0 | 0 | 1 | 0 | 2 | 0 | 3 | 0 | 2 | 1 | 0 | 10 |
| Quebec (Beveridge) | 0 | 1 | 5 | 0 | 1 | 0 | 1 | 0 | 1 | 0 | 0 | 3 | 12 |

| Team | 1 | 2 | 3 | 4 | 5 | 6 | 7 | 8 | 9 | 10 | 11 | 12 | Final |
| Nova Scotia (Franklin) | 1 | 0 | 3 | 0 | 1 | 0 | 1 | 0 | 1 | 0 | 2 | 0 | 9 |
| Northern Ontario (Grozelle) | 0 | 1 | 0 | 3 | 0 | 3 | 0 | 2 | 0 | 1 | 0 | 2 | 12 |

=== Draw 11 ===
| Team | 1 | 2 | 3 | 4 | 5 | 6 | 7 | 8 | 9 | 10 | 11 | 12 | Final |
| Alberta (Northcott) | 0 | 3 | 1 | 0 | 2 | 1 | 1 | 0 | 0 | 0 | 0 | 0 | 8 |
| Nova Scotia (Franklin) | 2 | 0 | 0 | 2 | 0 | 0 | 0 | 1 | 1 | 1 | 1 | 1 | 9 |

| Team | 1 | 2 | 3 | 4 | 5 | 6 | 7 | 8 | 9 | 10 | 11 | 12 | Final |
| Quebec (Beveridge) | 3 | 0 | 0 | 0 | 2 | 2 | 0 | 1 | 0 | 1 | 0 | 0 | 9 |
| (Newfoundland and Labrador) Newfoundland (Kalchak) | 0 | 3 | 1 | 2 | 0 | 0 | 1 | 0 | 0 | 0 | 2 | 2 | 11 |

| Team | 1 | 2 | 3 | 4 | 5 | 6 | 7 | 8 | 9 | 10 | 11 | 12 | Final |
| New Brunswick (Sullivan) | 0 | 1 | 0 | 1 | 0 | 2 | 0 | 2 | 0 | 0 | 1 | 0 | 7 |
| Northern Ontario (Grozelle) | 2 | 0 | 2 | 0 | 1 | 0 | 1 | 0 | 1 | 0 | 0 | 1 | 8 |

| Team | 1 | 2 | 3 | 4 | 5 | 6 | 7 | 8 | 9 | 10 | 11 | 12 | Final |
| Ontario (Phillips) | 0 | 0 | 0 | 4 | 1 | 0 | 2 | 0 | 1 | 0 | 3 | 0 | 11 |
| Prince Edward Island (MacDonald) | 2 | 1 | 3 | 0 | 0 | 1 | 0 | 0 | 0 | 1 | 0 | 0 | 8 |

| Team | 1 | 2 | 3 | 4 | 5 | 6 | 7 | 8 | 9 | 10 | 11 | 12 | Final |
| Manitoba (Hudson) | 1 | 0 | 0 | 1 | 0 | 0 | 0 | 1 | 0 | 1 | 1 | 2 | 7 |
| Saskatchewan (Wankel) | 0 | 0 | 1 | 0 | 1 | 1 | 0 | 0 | 1 | 0 | 0 | 0 | 4 |

== Awards ==
=== All-Star Team ===
The media selected the following curlers as All-Stars.

Bernie Sparkes was the first curler to make an All-Star team more than once as he also made the team the previous year.

| Position | Name | Team |
|---|---|---|
| Skip | Doug Wankel | Saskatchewan |
| Third | George Fink | Alberta |
| Second | Bernie Sparkes (2) | Alberta |
| Lead | Keith Reilly | Ontario |

=== Ross G.L. Harstone Award ===
The Ross Harstone Award was presented to the player chosen by their fellow peers as the curler who best represented Harstone's high ideals of good sportsmanship, observance of the rules, exemplary conduct and curling ability.

| Name | Team | Position |
|---|---|---|
| Buzz McGibney | British Columbia | Skip |
