= John Ross (curler) =

Canadian curler

John L Ross
- Curler
- Born: February 19, 1938 (age 88); Ontario

Curling career
- Member Association: Ontario
- Brier: 1 (1967)
- World Championship: 1 (1967)
Medal record
Representing Canada
World Curling Championships
Bronze medal – third place	1967 Perth
Representing Ontario
Macdonald Brier
Gold medal – first place	1967 Hull

John Ross (born February 19, 1938) is a Canadian former curler. He was the third on the 1967 Brier Champion team, representing Ontario (skipped by Alf Phillips, Jr.). The team later went on to finish third at the World Championships of that year.

He is not to be confused with John R. Ross and John K. Ross, curlers from Northern Ontario.
