= The Girl Who Came Back =

The Girl Who Came Back could refer to:

== Film ==
- The Girl Who Came Back (1918 film), American silent drama film directed by Robert G. Vignola
- The Girl Who Came Back (1923 film), American silent drama film directed by Tom Forman
- The Girl Who Came Back (1935 film), American crime film directed by Charles Lamont

== Literature ==
- The Girl Who Came Back, a 2005 novel by Barbara McMahon
- The Girl Who Came Back, a 2016 novel by Susan Lewis
- The Girl Who Came Back, a 2017 novel by Kerry Wilkinson

== See also ==
- The Man Who Came Back
