= Johnny Ross (rugby league) =

Australian rugby league footballer

Personal information
- Full name: Johnny Ross
- Born: 20 October 1931 Parramatta, New South Wales, Australia
- Died: 28 June 2018 (aged 86) Sydney, New South Wales, Australia

Playing information
- Position: Five-eighth
Club
| Years | Team | Pld | T | G | FG | P |
|---|---|---|---|---|---|---|
| 1951–55 | Parramatta | 33 | 6 | 0 | 0 | 18 |

Johnny Ross (1931-2018) was an Australian rugby league footballer who played as a five-eighth for Parramatta in the 1950s.

== Playing career ==
Ross was a Parramatta junior and made his first grade debut for the club in 1951. Ross played a total of 33 first grade games for Parramatta at a difficult time in the club's history with the newly admitted side struggling due to a weak playing roster and lack of resources. Ross claimed 2 wooden spoons as a player at the club. Ross played over 100 games in total for Parramatta including reserve grade and third grade appearances.

== Post playing ==
Ross coached teams in the local Wollongong district for a number of years before becoming a successful publican managing several pubs in New South Wales before retiring in 1997. Ross then became the founding chairman of HOSTPLUS, the industry superannuation fund for a range of industries including hospitality.
