= Christina McPhee =

American artist

Christina McPhee (born 1954) is an American painter, new media and video artist.

== Art ==
Christina McPhee works in drawing as a core practice, developing layered works that move from the paper into video and photomontage. Her work is concerned with psychogenerative landscapes and bioassemblage. In media arts, she moves scientific visualization into alternative maps based around site-specific observation. Her drawings involve linear, fugue-like structures that become topologic fields.
