= Moses Ross House =

Historic house in Pennsylvania, United States

- U.S. National Register of Historic Places
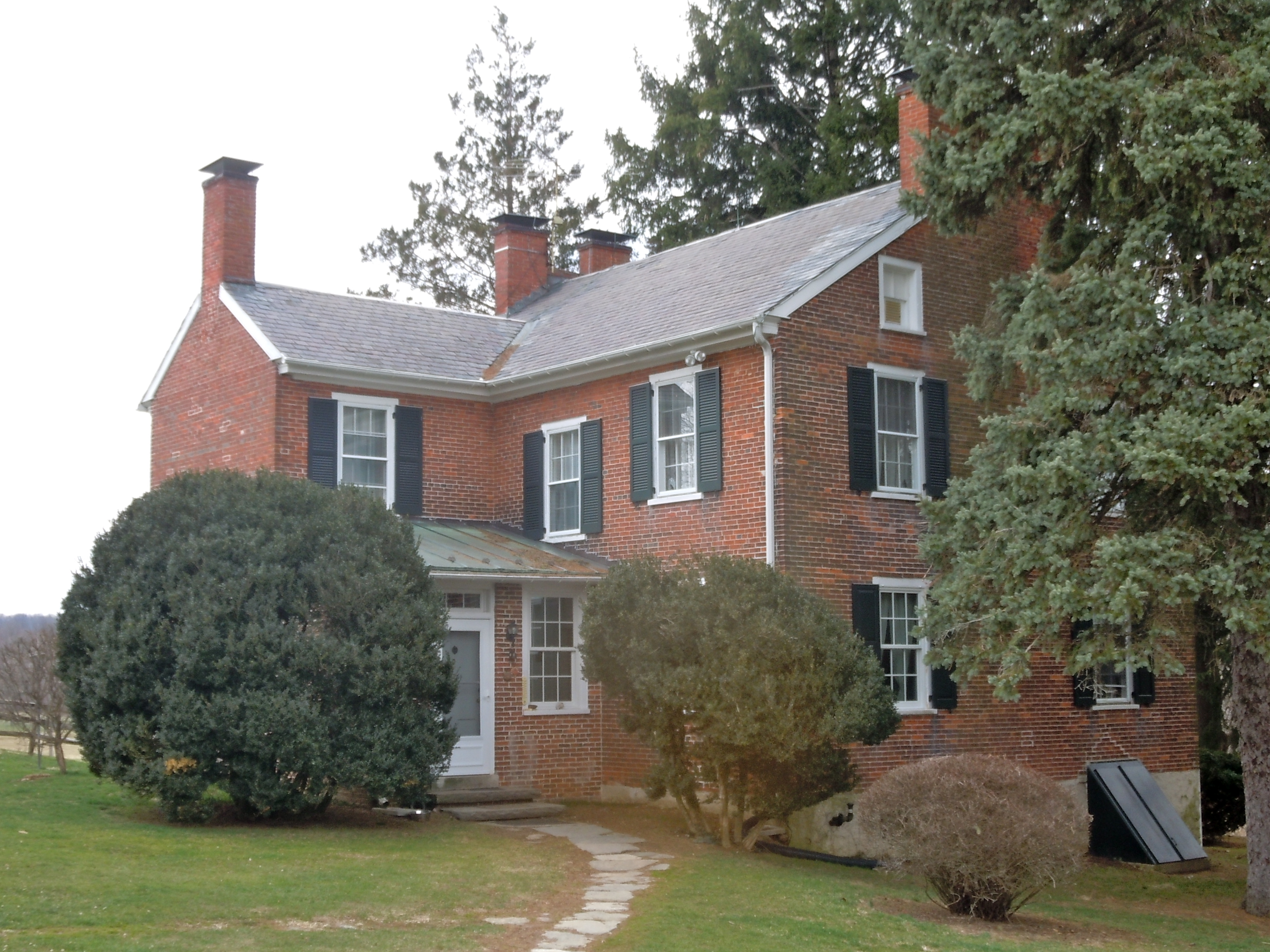
- Moses Ross House rear view, March 2011

- Location within Pennsylvania Location within the United States
- Location: Off Creek Road north of Daleville, Londonderry Township, Pennsylvania
- Coordinates: 39°53′45″N 75°52′21″W
- Area: 4.5 acres (1.8 ha)
- Built: c. 1850
- Architectural style: Greek Revival, Other, Vernacular Greek Revival
- MPS: West Branch Brandywine Creek MRA
- NRHP reference No.: 85002375
- Added to NRHP: September 16, 1985

Moses Ross House is a historic home located in Londonderry Township, Chester County, Pennsylvania. It was built about 1850, and is a two-story, five-bay, L-shaped brick dwelling with a full basement and attic. It has a gable roof and features a large two-story, pedimented front portico in the Greek Revival style.

It was added to the National Register of Historic Places in 1985.
