= John Ross (businessman) =

British businessman (1831–1876)

Colour-Sergeant John Ross, Esq. (1831 – 26 November 1876) was a Victorian businessman with substantial retail interests. His fortune was stolen by a lawyer on his death.

== Career ==
John Ross Hatters, High Street, Falkirk, in 1901

Born the son of a schoolteacher in the city centre of Glasgow, Ross came to Falkirk, the cradle of the Industrial Revolution in Falkirk, Scotland to set up retail outlets at the age of just 17, principally hatters and grocers on the High Street, the longest in Britain.

== Other interests ==
Ross had been a member of the local Volunteer Company since its formation in 1859, and had attained the rank of Colour-Sergeant by his death. He was also a dedicated Freemason, a successful member of the Curling, Bowling and Chess Clubs in the area (as his numerous prizes testified) and was one of only twelve members of the Ancient Order of Free Gardeners.

== Death ==
Ross died suddenly of a heart attack on Sunday 26 November 1876, and was interred with full military honours. His funeral was a grand occasion with a full march (followed by several carriages and a band) through the town and a gun salute. Hundreds of spectators lined the streets of Falkirk as the coffin was carried past, his remains followed by what the local newspaper deemed 'one of the largest company of mourners ever seen at a funeral in Falkirk'. Captain Nimmo of the Volunteers commented:

We have lost one of our best – one whose unerring eye, steady hand, and unfaltering heart have often helped us on to victory in many a bloodless encounter – one whose enthusiasm has animated us to continued zeal in the discharge of our duties as Volunteers, and whose genial presence on our more festive occasions, when with song or story he has cheered and charmed us, will long be missed and mourned by every member of this Company.

== Family and legacy ==
At only 45, Ross's death came as a great shock to the family, and his wife Agnes, was left to bring up his two sons and three daughters. His estate was valued at £11,000 on his death (£6.6 million in today's terms) but the lawyer entrusted to administer the estate escaped to the United States with the majority of the fortune, leaving the family with just over £1000 (£620,000 today) in capital and High Street property worth around £2.2 million today. Only one of the five children later married (Jean Ross to William Forbes), in order to save money, and as a result the family was comfortably placed in their later years.
