= Jack Ross (footballer, born 1895) =

Australian rules footballer

Personal information
- Full name: John William Ross
- Born: 15 August 1895; Ramsbottom, Lancashire, England
- Died: 29 September 1943 (aged 48); North Geelong, Victoria, Australia
- Original team: East Geelong
- Position: Defender

Playing career^{1}
Years	Club	Games (Goals)
1919	Geelong	2 (0)
- ^{1} Playing statistics correct to the end of 1919.

John William Ross (15 August 1895 – 29 September 1943) was an Australian rules footballer who played with Geelong in the Victorian Football League (VFL).

== Family ==
The son of David Ross (1870–1945), and Elizabeth Ross (1872–1919), John William Ross was born at the Manchester suburb of Ramsbottom on 15 August 1895.

He married Doris Evelyn Temple Dawson (1897–1997) at Heywood, Greater Manchester, England on 15 April 1922.
