= Jack Ross (footballer, born 1892) =

Australian rules footballer

Personal information
- Full name: John Charles Ross
- Born: 4 April 1892; Waurn Ponds, Victoria
- Died: 7 June 1973 (aged 81); Clontarf, Queensland
- Original team: Chilwell
- Height: 183 cm (6 ft 0 in)
- Weight: 81 kg (179 lb)
- Position: Follower

Playing career^{1}
| Years | Club | Games (Goals) |
| 1920–22 | Geelong | 33 (1) |
- ^{1} Playing statistics correct to the end of 1922.

John Charles Ross (4 April 1892 – 7 June 1973) was an Australian rules footballer who played with Geelong in the Victorian Football League (VFL).

He served in both World War I and World War II.
