= Tim Genis =

American timpanist

Tim Genis is an American timpanist. He is the principal timpanist of the Boston Symphony Orchestra, a position he has held since 2003. He was the assistant timpanist of the BSO from 1993 to 2003 and the associate timpanist and assistant principal percussionist of the Honolulu Symphony Orchestra from 1991 to 1993. He was also previously the assistant principal percussionist of the Hong Kong Philharmonic.

Genis holds an undergraduate degree from the Juilliard School where he studied with Roland Kohloff. He teaches at Boston University.

== Students ==
- Aziz Daniel Barnard Luce (principal percussion, Hong Kong Philharmonic)
- Dan Bauch (percussion and timpani, Boston Symphony Orchestra)
- Kyle Brightwell (percussion, Boston Symphony Orchestra)
- Matthew McKay (percussion, Boston Symphony Orchestra)
- Michael Israelievitch (principal timpani, SWR Symphonieorchester; formerly principal timpani and percussion, The Saint Paul Chamber Orchestra)
- Joseph Becker (principal percussion, Detroit Symphony Orchestra)
- Michael Roberts (percussion, Oregon Symphony)
- Keith Carrick (principal percussion, Utah Symphony)
