= Harvey Young =

African-American cultural historian

Harvey Young is an African-American cultural historian, theorist, and scholar.

== Career ==
Young's research on the performance and experience of race has been widely published in academic journals, profiled in The New Yorker, The Wall Street Journal and The Chronicle of Higher Education. As a commentator on popular culture, he has appeared on CNN, 20/20, and Good Morning America as well as within the pages of The New York Times, Vanity Fair and People.

He has published seven books, including Embodying Black Experience, winner of “Book of the Year” awards from the National Communication Association and the American Society for Theatre Research. His edited collection (with Megan Geigner) Theatre After Empire was published in 2021.

In January 2018, he became Dean of the College of Fine Arts at Boston University. Between 2002 and 2017, Young was a member of the faculty of Northwestern University, where he was Professor and Chair of Theatre and held appointments in African American Studies, Performance Studies, and Radio/Television/Film. Young attracted media attention in November 2017 when it was announced that Megan Markle was to marry Prince Harry: Young had taught Markle during his time at Northwestern.

He was President of the Association for Theatre in Higher Education and has served as Trustee/Board Member of the African American Arts Alliance of Chicago, American Society for Theatre Research, Boston Youth Symphony Orchestra and Yale Club of Chicago. A former Harvard and Stanford fellow, Young graduated with honors from Yale and holds a M.A. from the University at Buffalo and a Ph.D. from Cornell.

== Books ==
Young's first book, Embodying Black Experience: Stillness, Critical Memory and the Black Body (2010) chronicles a set of black experiences, or what he calls, "phenomenal blackness," that developed not only from the experience of abuse but also from a variety of performances of resistance that were devised to respond to the highly predictable and anticipated arrival of racial violence within a person's lifetime. The book won the Lilla A. Heston Award for Outstanding Scholarship and was hailed by Theatre Journal as "performance studies at its engaged and engaging best."

His other books include:

- Rivera-Servera, R.; Young, H., eds. (17 November 2010). Performance in the Borderlands. Springer. ISBN 978-0-230-29455-4.
- Rugg, Rebecca Ann; Young, Harvey, eds. (2012). Reimagining A Raisin in the Sun: Four New Plays. Northwestern University Press. ISBN 978-0-8101-2813-2.
- Young, Harvey, ed. (2023). The Cambridge Companion to African American Theatre. doi:10.1017/9781009359566. ISBN 978-1-00-935956-6.
- Theatre and Race (2013)
- Kolin, Philip; Young, Harvey, eds. (2013). Suzan-Lori Parks in Person. doi:10.4324/9780203103845. ISBN 978-1-136-24664-7.
