= Grant Drumheller =

American painter

- Born: Grant Drumheller; Davis, California
- Education: BFA, MFA from Boston University, study with Philip Guston, James Weeks, Reed Kay
- Known for: Painting

Grant Drumheller is an American figurative painter.

== Biography ==
Drumheller earned his BFA (1976) and Master of Fine Arts (1978) degrees cum laude from Boston University. He also studied with Philip Guston, James Weeks and Reed Kay. Drumheller has taught at Boston University, the Art Institute of Boston and is currently Professor of Art at the University of New Hampshire. Originally he painted large works alluding to myth and allegory, but now works on smaller pieces.

== Awards and honors ==
2008

- Visiting Artist, American Academy in Rome

2004

- Finalist, Artist Advancement Award, Greater Piscataqua Charitable Foundation

2002

- Hatch Fund Award, College of Liberal Arts, Dept of Art and art History. In support of the catalog to accompany the Boston
- University Show,“A Private View: Paintings by Grant Drumheller”.

1996 New England Foundation for the Arts- NEA Regional

- Fellowship in Painting

1993

- Discretionary Fund Award, UNH.

2001, '98, '95, '93, '91

- Liberal Arts Faculty Research Grant, UNH

1992, '89

- UNH Faculty Fellowship, summer

1986

- Pollock-Krasner Foundation Grant

1983

- National Endowment for the Arts, Artists Fellowship
- Alternate, Prix de Rome in Painting

1982

- The MacDowell Foundation, Jean and Louis Dreyfus Fellow
- Yaddo Art Colony, Invitation

1981

- Blanche Colman Award

1978-79

- Fulbright-Hays Grant, Painting in Italy

1976-78

- Graduate Teaching Fellowship, Boston University

1976

- Harold C Case Scholarship.
