= André de Quadros =

Indian conductor

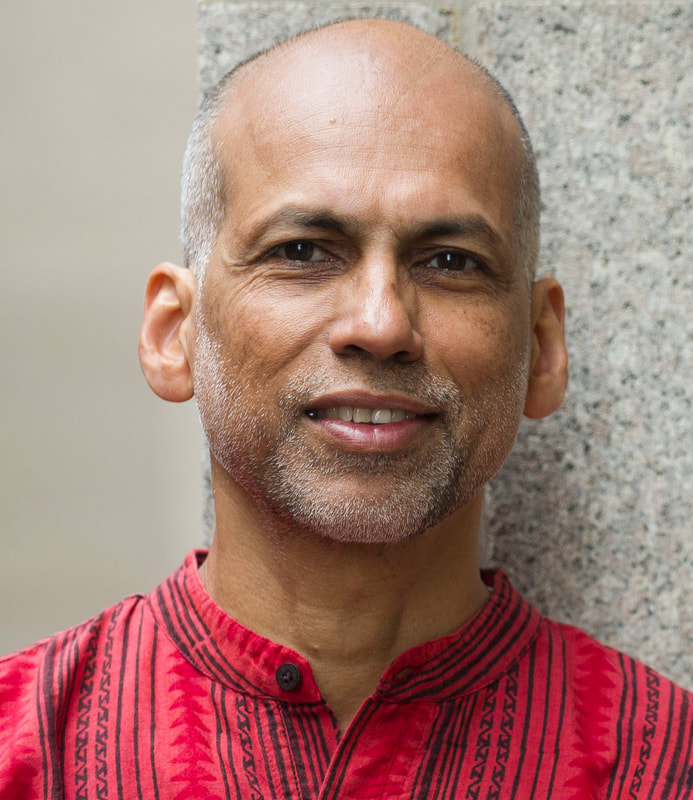
- Born: Bombay, India
- Occupation(s): Professor at Boston University, Conductor, Artistic Director: VOICES 21C, Common Ground Voices, Common Ground Voices / La Frontera, Muslim Choral Ensemble of Sri Lanka, Manado State University Choir
- Website: andredequadros.com

André de Quadros is a conductor, ethnomusicologist, music educator, and human rights activist.

== Early life ==
André de Quadros grew up in Bombay, India, in a Goan Catholic family. His father, Pedro António de Quadros, had grown up in Raia, Goa and then moved to British India to study medicine. His mother, Jean Anne Lourdes Coelho, was born in Calcutta and grew up in Lahore. Her family had moved to Punjab because her father had bought a general store, E. Plomer & Co. Quadros has two siblings: an older sister named Marise, and a younger sister named Claudia. He started studying the violin at the age of four with Adrian de Mello.

== Education ==
André de Quadros attended Campion School, Mumbai, where he finished his secondary education in 1969. He was active in debating and quiz competitions in school. He enrolled in St. Xavier's College, Mumbai, where he had initially intended to pursue pre-medical studies. However, he changed directions, and majored in economics with a minor in econometrics and statistics. While at St Xavier's College, he enrolled at the Bombay School of Music, where he studied conducting with Joachim Buehler, who mentored him in orchestral and choral conducting. Further studies took place in Australia, where he undertook graduate studies in musicology and composition at La Trobe University for a Graduate Diploma of Humanities. Simultaneously, he pursued a Graduate Diploma in Movement and Dance at the University of Melbourne. In 1979, he won a DAAD (Deutscher Akademischer Austauschdienst) scholarship for graduate study at the Universität Mozarteum Salzburg in Austria. Upon returning to Australia, and over several years, he completed a broad range of graduate degrees. These included a Graduate Diploma in Music, studying conducting with Robert Rosen at the Victorian College of the Arts. At La Trobe University, he also completed an MEd and an EdD. Finally, while working at Monash University he completed a Graduate Certificate in Higher Education.

== Honors and awards ==
Jane Frazee Distinguished Scholar, University of St. Thomas, 2023. Eric Oddleifson Arts|Learning Service Award, 2022. Helen Kemp Lifetime Achievement Award, American Choral Directors Association (Eastern Region), 2022. Brazeal Wayne Dennard Award, Chorus America, 2021. Honorary Life Membership, Victorian Orff Schulwerk Association, Australia, 1999. Honorary Life Membership, Monash University Choral Society, Australia, 1995. Monash University President and Vice-Chancellor's Award for Distinguished Teaching: Special Commendation, 1998.

== Career ==
=== Music Education ===
André de Quadros began his music teaching career while he was a graduate student at La Trobe University. His first job was as the specialist music teacher at St Mary's Primary School, Altona, a Catholic elementary school in the outer Western suburbs of Melbourne. This was followed by similar positions in two other Catholic primary schools as well as the junior school of Kingswood College. In 1981, he was appointed to a coordinator position at Billanook College, an open entry non-selective school, in the outer eastern suburbs of Melbourne. It was at Billanook that he explored his educational work in music and movement improvisation, connecting to theatre. In the early 1980s, he taught music workshops for babies and toddlers. After five years, in 1986, he accepted a position at a secondary girls’ school, Presbyterian Ladies' College, Melbourne, where he remained full time until 1991. In his final year, he directed the music school, with its ambitious program in creative music, together with a vigorous choral and orchestral program. He directed an award-winning chamber choir and the premier symphony orchestra. While he was teaching in elementary and secondary schools, he was engaged in giving creative music and movement workshops for pre-service and in-service teachers. In 1991-1992, he taught music education methods part-time to pre-service music teachers at the Australian Catholic University. He was involved in leading key statewide curriculum developments for high school, which led to new music courses as part of the Victorian Certificate of Education. Active in professional associations, he served as the president of the Victorian Orff Schulwerk Association, and the founding president of the Australian National Council of Orff Schulwerk. In 1995, he was the artistic director of Orff 100, a festival to honor the birth centenary of Carl Orff.

=== Conducting ===
His conducting career started when he led the choir at St. Xavier's College, Mumbai in 1973, while still an undergraduate student. In Mumbai, his conducting teacher, Joachim Buehler mentored him in choral and orchestral conducting, giving him podium time with the Bombay Chamber Orchestra and the Bombay Cantata Choir. He served as assistant conductor of the latter ensemble. After migrating to Australia, he resumed conducting when he was appointed conductor of the Monash University Choral Society (MonUCS) in 1985. By the time he concluded his tenure with MonUCS, he had been its longest serving conductor. At Presbyterian Ladies' College, he conducted the concert band, the symphony orchestra, He founded and conducted the Chamber Singers that won first prize in the Australian Choral Championships. In 1991, he was appointed to the faculty at Monash University to direct the orchestral and choral programs where he directed the New Monash Orchestra, the string orchestra, the Viva Voce choir, and the women's choir. Numerous concerts in Asia and Europe followed including the National Philharmonic Orchestra of Bulgaria with which he toured Spain, the Prokofiev Symphony Orchestra (Ukraine), the National Youth Choirs of Great Britain, the Nusantara Chamber Orchestra (Indonesia), the Moscow State Radio Symphony Orchestra, and the Jauna Muzika choir (Lithuania). Following his professorial appointment at Boston University, he conducted the Boston University Symphony Orchestra and the Tanglewood Institute Young Artists Orchestra. In 2004, he conducted the Massachusetts All-State Chorus (USA).

In the early years of the twenty-first century, he was increasingly involved in conducting concerts in Indonesia, particularly focusing on major choral/orchestral works. He gave several first performances of large-scale choral/orchestral works in Jakarta, Surabaya, Bandung, Medan, and in the province of North Sulawesi. His frequent visits to Indonesia resulted in a close relationship with the Manado State University Choir (MSUC) from the province of North Sulawesi, which he has directed since 2009. With MSUC, he undertook several tours that included France, Latvia, Poland, Sweden, and the United States. Under his direction, MSUC was the first Indonesian choir to break through the diplomatic barrier in traveling to Israel.

== Publications ==
Books:

- de Quadros, A. & Amrein, E. (2022). Empowering Song: Music Education from the Margins. Routledge.
- de Quadros, A., Kelman, D., White, J., Sonn C., & Baker, A. (2022). Poking the Wasp Nest: Young People Challenge and Educate Race through Applied Theatre. Brill. ISBN 9789004505599.
- Vu, K. T., & de Quadros, A. (Eds.). (2020). My Body Was Left on The Street - Music Education and Displacement. Brill. ISBN 9789004430464.
- de Quadros, André (2019). Focus: Choral Music in Global Perspective. Routledge. ISBN 978-0415896559.
- Palmer, Anthony, de Quadros, André (2012). Tanglewood II: Summoning the Future of Music Education. GIA Publications.
- de Quadros, A., Hillman, J., & Howe, E. (2014). And Neither Have I Wings to Fly: Empowering Song: Arts in the Boston University Prison Education Program. Boston University College of Fine Arts.
- de Quadros, André (2012). The Cambridge Companion to Choral Music. Cambridge University Press. ISBN 978-0521128957.
- de Quadros, André (2000). Many seeds, different flowers : the music education legacy of Carl Orff. Perth: CIRCME. OCLC 681508969.
