= John Ross House (Durban, South Africa) =

Skyscraper

Coordinates: 29.86082°S 31.03011°E

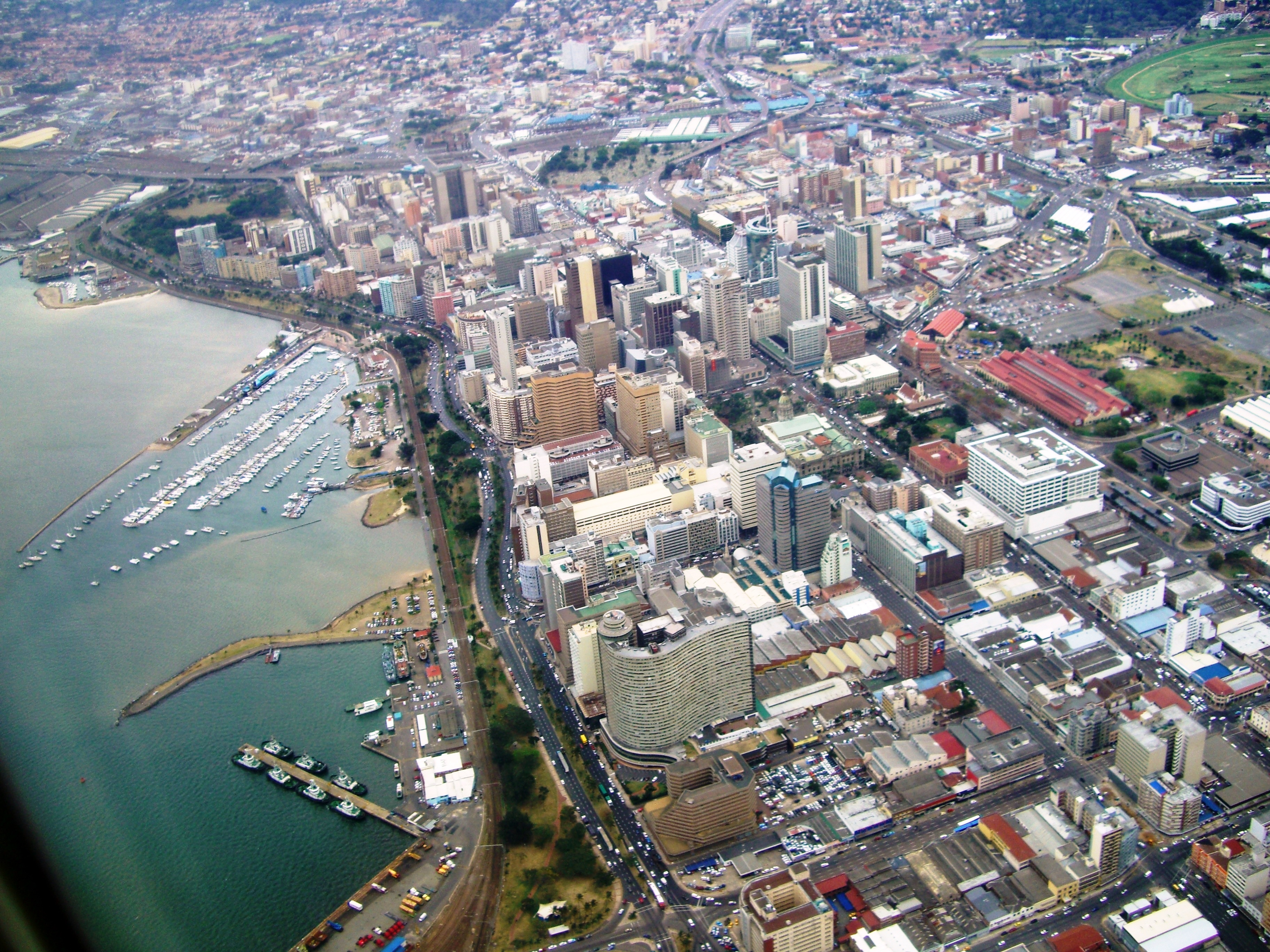
John Ross House is prominent in the foreground of this aerial photograph of Durban

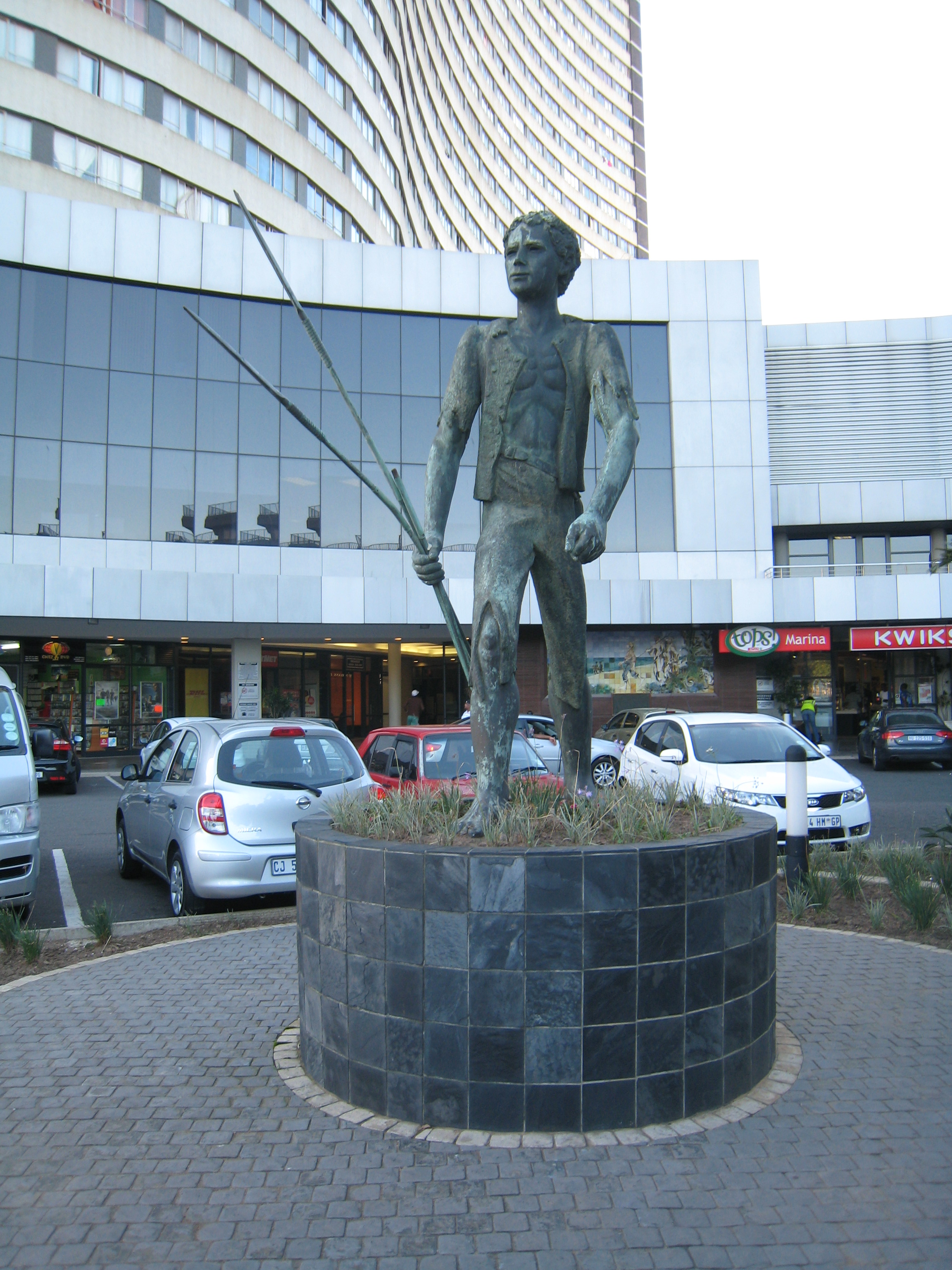
Statue of "John Ross" at John Ross House, Durban

The John Ross House in Durban, South Africa is a 33-storey skyscraper on Victoria Embankment.

It is named after "John Ross" (real name, Charles Rawden Maclean), who at the age of 15 walked from Port Natal to Delagoa Bay and back to procure medicine and supplies. His statue stands outside the building.

On top of the tower is the Roma Revolving Restaurant. The building is 109 metres (358 feet) high and was renovated in 2009.

This skyscraper on Durban’s infamous Victoria Embankment is now home to many residents and is used for commercial and lifestyle purposes as well.
