= John Rossiter (novelist) =

British novelist (1916–2005)

- Born: 2 March 1916; Staverton, Devon, U.K.
- Died: 2005 (aged 88–89)
- Occupation: Novelist
- Writing career
- Pen name: Jonathan Ross
- Language: English
- Genre: Police procedural

John Rossiter, born on 2 March 1916 in Staverton, Devon, England, and died in 2005 in the United Kingdom, was a British writer, author of spy novels and, under the pseudonym Jonathan Ross, around twenty police procedural novels.

== Life ==
From 1924 to 1932 he completed his studies at the Royal Military Academy, Woolwich. He was a detective in the Wiltshire Police force from 1939 to 1969, except during World War II, from 1943 to 1946, when he served as a lieutenant in the Royal Air Force. He was also a columnist for the Wiltshire Courier newspaper from 1963 to 1964.

Shortly before his retirement from the police, he began a career as a writer by publishing in 1968, under the pseudonym Jonathan Ross, the first title of a series in the police procedural genre, whose recurrent hero is the irascible Chief Inspector George Rogers of 'Abbotsburn', with his assistant Detective Inspector David Lingard, a dandy who likes to take snuff, which annoys his superior. Unyielding in his methods, Rogers is often entangled in a complex investigation, but his sense of method allows him to get by.

After the publication of four titles in his crime series, Rossiter published under his own name a series of espionage thrillers following the missions of British agent Roger Tallis. Given the lack of success encountered, the author tried further thrillers, before limiting himself to the investigations of George Rogers.

== Work ==
=== Novels ===
==== Roger Tallis spy series ====
- The Murder Makers (1970)
- The Deadly Green (1970)
- A Rope for General Dietz (1972)
- The Deadly Gold (1975)

==== Other novels ====
- The Victims (1971)
- The Manipulators (1973)
- The Villains (1974)
- The Man Who Came Back (1978)
- Dark Flight (1981)

==== Inspector George Rogers police series under pseudonym Jonathan Ross ====
- The Blood Running Cold (1968)
- Diminished by Death (1968)
- Death at First Hand (1969)
- The Deadest Thing You Ever Saw (1969)
- Here Lies Nancy Frail (1972)
- The Burning of Billy Toober (1974)
- I Know What It’s Like To Die (1976)
- A Rattling of Old Bones (1979)
- Dark Blue and Dangerous (1981)
- Death’s Head (1982)
- Dead Eye (1983)
- Dropped Dead (1984)
- Burial Deferred (1985)
- Fate Accomplished (1987)
- Sudden Departures (1988)
- A Time for Dying (1989)
- Daphne Dead and Done for (1990)
- Murder Be Hanged (1992)
- The Body of a Woman (1994), also entitled None the Worse for a Hanging
- Murder! Murder! Burning Bright (1996)
- This Too, Too Sullied Flesh (1997)

== Sources ==
- International Who's Who of Authors and Writers 2004. London: Europa Publications, 2003. ISBN 9781857431797. p. 479.
- "Rossiter, John [Jonathan Ross] (1916-2005)". Boston University: Howard Gotlieb Archival Research Center.
- "John Rossiter". Stop, You're Killing Me!.
