= John A. Ross (composer) =

American jazz musician

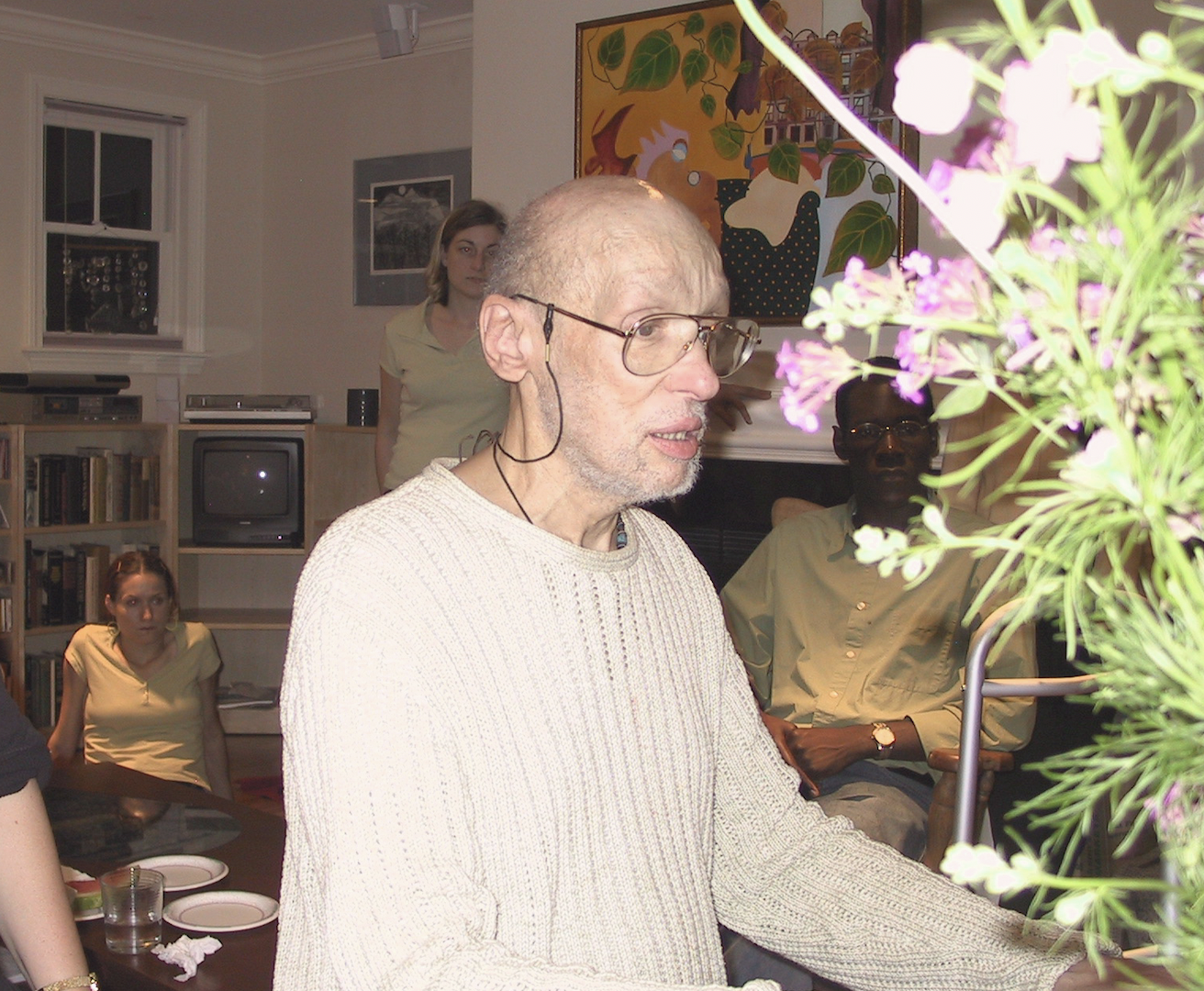
Enjoying good food, company and friendship. MF home.

John Andrew Ross (December 15, 1940 – June 12, 2006) was an African American jazz musician, composer, musical director, and choral conductor. Ross was born and raised in Roxbury, Massachusetts and remained in the Boston, Massachusetts area for his whole life. While growing up in Roxbury, Ross's home was frequently visited by his father's college roommate, Langston Hughes. The relationship shared between Hughes and Ross would later manifest as Ross becoming the musical director of Langston Hughes's gospel play "Black Nativity". Acquaintances of Ross, recall him as a welcoming man with a glowing presence and a knack for fine foods.

== Biography ==
=== Early life ===
John Ross was born to Olga Evelyn White and Melvin Everand Ross on December 15, 1940. He grew up in Roxbury, Massachusetts, with his parents and sister Paula Ann Ross. His childhood was heavily influenced by music and the presence of Langston Hughes. Hughes would come and stay with Ross's family when he lectured in Boston, Massachusetts because of his long-standing relationship with Ross's father, Melvin. As a child, Ross was somewhat unaware of Hughes's celebrity status and was able to maintain an organic relationship with the Harlem Renaissance writer.

=== Education ===
Ross began attending Boston University to pursue a concentrated degree in Church Music. Ross received a degree from Boston University's College of Liberal Arts in 1960 and another degree from Boston University's School of Fine and Applied Arts in 1964.

== Arts education career ==
=== Elma Lewis School of Fine Arts ===
John Ross began working at the Elma Lewis School of Fine Arts in 1969 and stood as the chairman of the Music Department. Ross had a preexisting relationship with Elma Lewis prior to his employment at her school, and she saw a similar appreciation for the musical arts in Ross as she did herself. Ross's responsibilities as the chairman of the Department of Music included overseeing a staff of over forty teachers who were educating more than four hundred students. To alleviate some of the stress from having to supervise so many employees, Ross hired Betty Hillmon as the director of Musical Instruction in 1972. With Hillmon standing as the director of Musical Instruction, Ross was able to take a few steps back from his position as chairman of the Department of Music. With his extra time, Ross focused on forming the choral ensembles Children of Black Persuasion and its adult equivalent, Voices of Black Persuasion.

=== National Center of Afro–American Artists ===
John Ross began working as the director of the Music Division at the National Center of Afro-American Artists (NCAAA) in the 1970s. While he held this position, he was also standing as the chairman of the Music Department at the Elma Lewis School of Fine Arts (ELSFA). The National Center of Afro-American Artists was initially a professional organization associated with ELSFA and later merged with ELSFA in the 1980s.

== Musical work ==
=== Musical Ministry ===
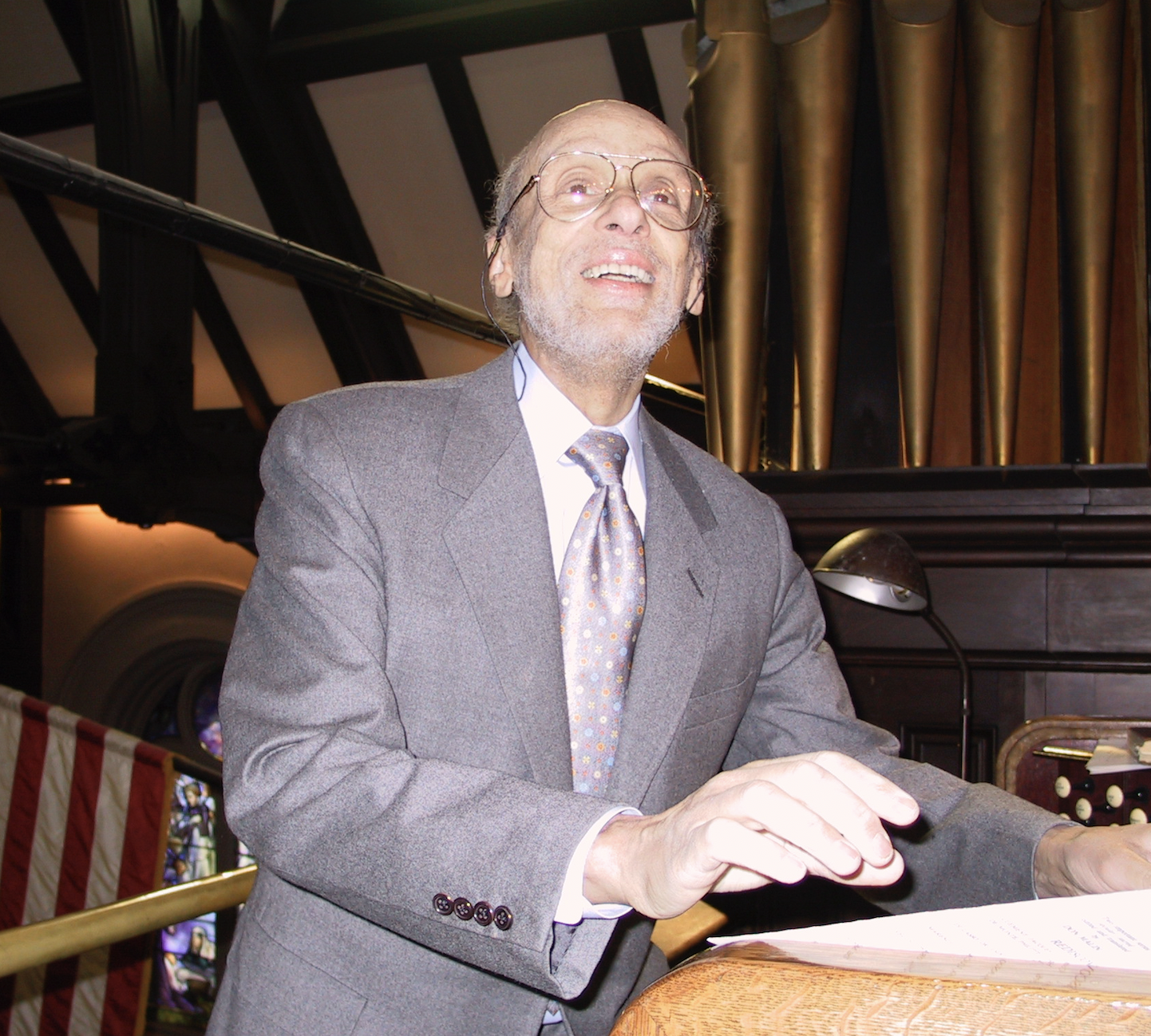
Joyful John during choir practice at First Parish UU, Brookline, MA

John Ross worked with the congregation at the First Parish Church in Brookline, Massachusetts beginning in 1986. After working with the congregation, Ross pursued and later became ordained as the Minister of Music for the First Parish Church in Brookline on November 12, 1995.

=== Black Nativity ===
Ross joined the production of "Black Nativity" as the musical mirector in 1970. His work with "Black Nativity" is what he is most known for. Ross remained as the musical director until his passing in 2006. The first production of "Black Nativity" that Ross worked on drew inspiration from the voice of Vivian Cooley-Collier. "Black Nativity" is the story about Christmas performed by an entirely black cast. The show was originally imagined by Langston Hughes and is performed every year in Boston, Massachusetts.

=== Other music-related work ===
Ross worked on many side projects while serving as the musical director of "Black Nativity," and the minister of music at the First Parish Church in Brookline, Massachusetts. Ross was an active member of the American Guild of Organists, a published author, and led the music ensembles Contra-Band and the Voices of Black Persuasion.

== Discography and other works ==
=== Albums ===
- Comin' up Shoutin': Gospel Songs and Spirituals Newly Arranged, (1997)
- Black Nativity : NCAA'S sound track of 'Black Nativity' performed by the Voices of Black Persuasion and the Children of Black Persuasion. (1995) a Milestones and Marvels Production, Produced by John Andrew Ross

=== Books ===
- Climbing Jacob’s Ladder: Heroes of the Bible in African-American Spirituals (1987)
- What a Morning: The Christmas Story in Black Spirituals,1991

== Death ==
Ross died at the age of 65 on Monday, June 12, 2006, in his lifelong hometown of Boston, Massachusetts. Ross's death was caused due to heart failure.His Memorial Service was Sunday, July 23, 2006, at 3 pm at First Parish in Brookline, Walnut Street, Brookline. A reception followed at the Museum of the National Center of Afro-American Artists.

His papers are held in the Northeastern University Archives and Special Collections.

== Awards and honors ==
- 1981 Ross won the Regional Emmy Award with Billy Wilson for his work on "Blue and Gone"
- 1988 Ross was awarded the Coretta Scott King Book Award for his work with What a Morning! The Christmas Story in Black Spirituals
- 1990 Ross won the Reverend Martin Luther King Jr. Achievement Award from the City of Boston
- 2000 Ross won the New England Conservatory Anna Bobbitt Gardener Lifetime Achievement Award
- 2005 Ross received the Tri-Ad Veterans League award for Music and Theater
- 2006 Before Ross' passing he received the Lifetime Achievement award from the Friends of the Urban League
