= John Ross House (Branson, Missouri) =

Historic house in Missouri, United States

- U.S. National Register of Historic Places
- Location within Missouri Location within the United States
- Location: Route 76, near Branson, Missouri
- Coordinates: 36°38′58″N 93°18′30″W
- Area: less than one acre
- Built by: Ross, John & Charles
- NRHP reference No.: 83001054
- Added to NRHP: July 21, 1983

John Ross House, also known as Old Matt's Cabin, is a historic home located at the Shepherd of the Hills farm near Branson, Taney County, Missouri. The original section was built in the mid-1880s or mid-1890s, as a single cell log structure. It was subsequently enlarged with frame additions through 1910. It features a stone exterior end chimney.

It was listed on the National Register of Historic Places in 1983.
