= Alfie Phillips Jr. =

Canadian curler

- Curler
- Born: c. 1938 (age 87–88); Toronto, Ontario, Canada

Curling career
- Member Association: Ontario
- Brier: 1 (1967)
- World Championship: 1 (1967)
Medal record
Representing Canada
World Curling Championships
Bronze medal – third place	1967 Perth
Representing Ontario
Macdonald Brier
Gold medal – first place	1967 Hull

Alfred J. Phillips Jr. (born c. 1938) is a Canadian former curler. He was the skip of the 1967 Brier Champion team, representing Ontario. The team later went on to finish third at the World Championships of that year.

A year following their Brier championship, the team finished second in a bonspiel, earning them more than $3,000, more than the allowable $150 by the Ontario Curling Association. At the time, the OCA forbade professional teams from participating in Brier playdowns. Phillips donated his money to charity, but the rest of his team kept their earnings, and were thus were suspended from OCA competitions. The move forced the OCA to allow professionals, but Phillips' team remained suspended, breaking the team apart.

Phillips was inducted into the Canadian Curling Hall of Fame in 2023.

In addition to his on-ice accolades, Phillips co-founded the Ontario Curling Report. His father Alf Phillips Sr. was an Olympic diver, and represented Ontario at the 1956 Brier.
