= Fort Rouge Curling Club =

Curling club in Winnipeg, Manitoba

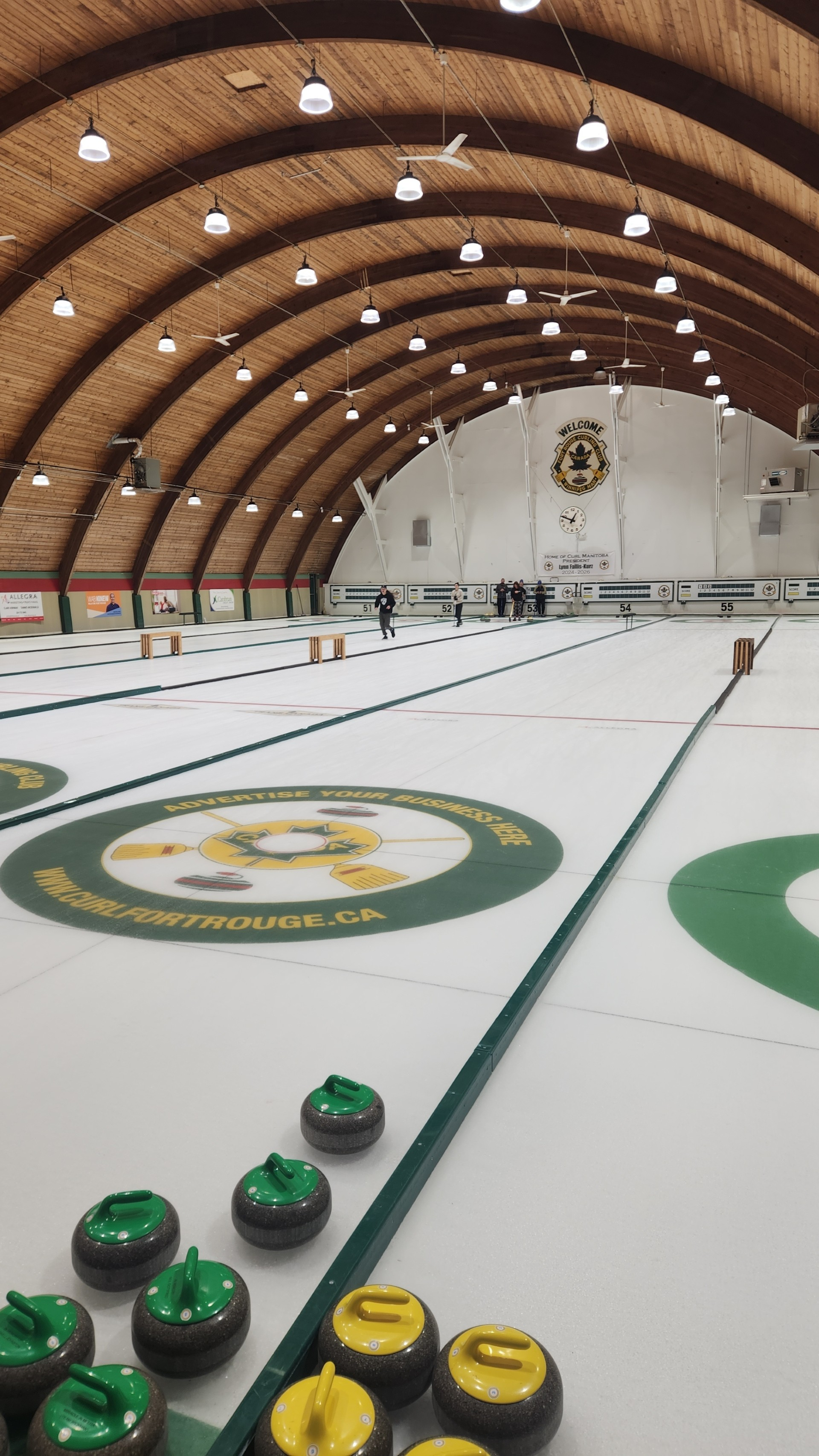
- Interior of the Fort Rouge Curling Club from ice level
- Interactive map of Fort Rouge Curling Club
- Location: 750 Daly St; Winnipeg, Manitoba R3L 2N2; Canada; 49.8627°N 97.1401°W

Information
- Established: 1915
- Club type: Dedicated ice
- Curling Canada region: Curl Manitoba
- Sheets of ice: Six
- Website: https://curlfortrouge.ca/

The Fort Rouge Curling Club is a curling club located in the Fort Rouge district of Winnipeg, Manitoba. Known as “The Home of Friendly Curling,” the club has hosted many successful teams on both the provincial and national level.

== History ==
The Fort Rouge Curling Club joined the Manitoba Curling Association in 1915, while the Fort Rouge Ladies Curling Club was one of the founding members of the Manitoba Ladies Curling Association in 1924. In 1919, the first Fort Rouge Curling Club rink was built at the corner of Kylemore Avenue and Osborne Street. This building would later be demolished, and a new facility was built in 1959, a few blocks away on Daly Street in the Lord Roberts neighbourhood where it stands today. The Home of Friendly Curling's clubhouse has been recognized as a historical site by the Manitoba Historical Society.

The curling club also host the A&V drive in restaurant, a seasonal venue serving Greek and Canadian cuisine. The club also host the Dan Hildebrand Lounge, a bar and snack area with views of the curling rink.

== Champions ==
=== Men's ===
The Rouge was the home club of the 1972 World Championship winning team of Orest Meleschuk, Dave Romano, John Hanesiak and Pat Hailley, a team most notable for the "Curse of LaBonte" incident. The club has produced two other Canadian championship rinks, in 1952 and 1956 (pre-dating the World Championships), both skipped by Billy Walsh. The 1952 Brier championship team included Al Langlois, Andy McWilliams and John Watson while the 1956 championship team included Langlois, Cy White and McWilliams. The club is also home to the 2016 men's provincial champion rink, consisting of Mike McEwen, B. J. Neufeld, Matt Wozniak and Denni Neufeld.

=== Women's ===
The Rouge was also the home club of the 1984 World Women's Curling Championship winning team of Connie Laliberte, Chris More, Corinne Peters and Janet Arnott. Laliberte also won a bronze medal at the 1992 Canada Safeway World Women's Curling Championship with teammates Laurie Allen, Cathy Gauthier and Arnott and a silver medal at the 1995 Ford World Women's Curling Championship with Cathy Overton, Gauthier and Arnott. Teams from the Fort Rouge won numerous provincial women's championships, including:

- 1958: Esther Poulton, May Graham, Mary Chalmers, Dorothy Starr
- 1984: Laliberte, More, Peters, Arnott
- 1989: Chris More, Karen Purdy, Lori Zeller, Kristen Kuruluk
- 1992: Laliberte, Allen, Gauthier, Arnott
- 1994: Laliberte, Purdy, Gauthier, Arnott
- 1995: Laliberte, Purdy (replaced by Overton), Gauthier, Arnott
- 1999: Laliberte, Overton-Clapham, Debbie Jones-Walker, Arnott
- 2000: Overton-Clapham, Jill Staub, Jones-Walker, Arnott
- 2003: Barb Spencer, Darcy Robertson, Barb Enright, Faye Unrau
- 2006: Janet Harvey, Jill Thurston, Cherie-Ann Loder, Carey Burges
- 2009: Spencer, Robertson, Brette Richards, Barb Enright
- 2011: Overton-Clapham, Karen Fallis, Leslie Wilson, Raunora Westcott
- 2014: Chelsea Carey, Kristy McDonald, Kristen Foster, Lindsay Titheridge

=== Junior ===
Provincial junior championship rinks include:

- 1990 women's: Nancy Malanchuk, Raili Walker, Jill Ursel, Natalie Claude
- 1993 men's: Mike Mansell, Doug Pottinger, Jason Fuchs, Keith Marshall
- 1995 men's: Chris Galbraith, Scott Cripps, Brent Barrett, Bryan Galbraith (Canadian Champions, World Bronze Medallists)
- 2015 women's: Beth Peterson, Robyn Njegovan, Melissa Gordon, Breanne Yozenko
- 2016 women's: Abby Ackland, Robyn Njegovan, Melissa Gordon, Sara Oliver

=== Senior ===
Provincial senior championship rinks include:

- 1999 men's: Ron Westcott, Neil Andrews, Bob Boughey, Ron Toews

=== Masters ===
Provincial masters championship rinks include:

- 1987 men's: Colin Milne, Mike Prymak, Jack Stoneman, Claude Reid
- 1988 men's: Ken Hilton, Colin Milne, Bud Snarr, George Lowe
- 1993 men's: Lyle Henry, Colin Milne, Fraser Muldrew, Jim Penston
- 2010 men's: Ron Westcott, Bob Jenion, Bob Boughey, Gary Smith
- 2012 men's: Ron Westcott, Bob Jenion, Bob Boughey, Gary Smith
- 2014 men's: Ron Westcott, Ken Dusablon, Bob Boughey, Ron Toews
- 2015 men's: Ron Westcott, Ken Dusablon, Bob Boughey, Howard Restall (Canadian Champions)

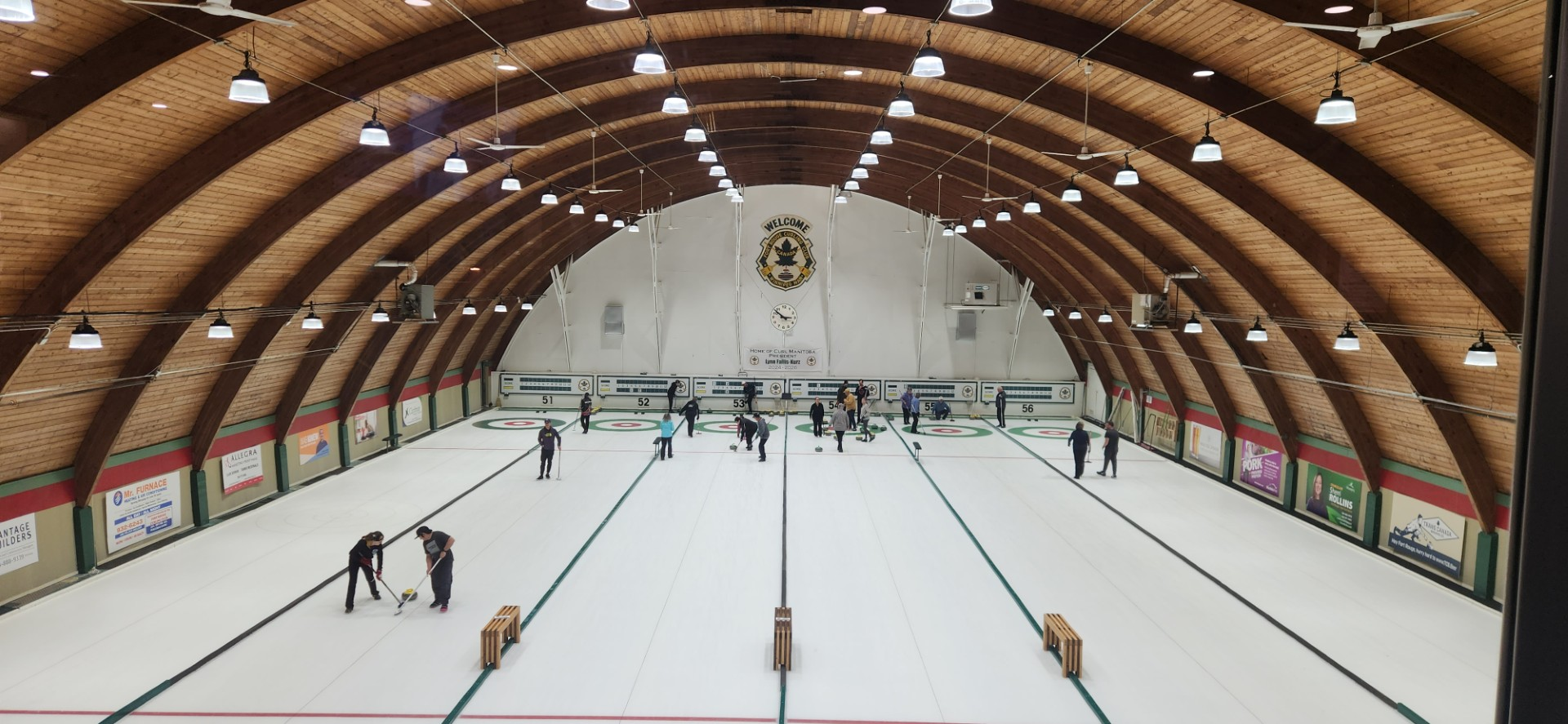
Inside the Fort Rouge Curling Club from the bar above the ice

=== Travelers Curling Club Championship ===
The Fort Rouge Curling Club won the 2016 Travelers Curling Club Championship, women's division. Members of the winning team were Tracy Andries, Crystal Kennedy, Dianne Christensen and April Klassen.
