= Eldon Coombe =

Canadian curler (1941–2026)

Medal record

Curling

Macdonald Brier
Bronze medal – third place	1972 St. John's	

Eldon James Coombe (May 8, 1941 – May 22, 2026) was a Canadian curler from Ottawa, Ontario. Coombe and his Ottawa Curling Club rink of third Keith Forgues, Second Jim Patrick and Lead Barry Provost "dominated the curling scene (in Eastern Ontario and Quebec) from the mid 60s to the mid 70s". In 1972, he became the first skip of an Ottawa-based team to represent Ontario at the Brier, Canada's national men's curling championship.

== Career ==
=== Youth ===
Coombe began curling at age 15, choosing the sport in high school, as he was too small to play hockey, football or basketball. While attending Glebe Collegiate Institute, he was a member of the team that won the C.B. Hermann Trophy Event, Ottawa's top high school curling trophy. The following year, he skipped one of two Glebe Collegiate rinks to win the Cole Cup double rink event. After graduating from Glebe, Coombe attended Carleton University.

=== Men's ===
Coombe played in his first provincial men's championship (the called the British Consols) in 1963, playing lead for the Bob Knipperberg rink, playing out of the Glebe Curling Club. The team finished the round robin of the 1963 Consols with a 5–2 record, in second place behind the champion Bob Mann rink from Hanover. Coombe played one more season with Knipperberg before forming his own rink in 1964.

Coombe, and his Ottawa Curling Club rink of Jim Patrick, Brian Morrison and Keith Forgues won the Royal Jubilee Trophy in 1966, which they followed up by winning the Governor General's Trophy double rink event two weeks later with Gord Brown skipping the other Ottawa rink, and swept that year's Canadian Branch championships by winning the Colts single rink event later in the month.

While they didn't make it to the provincial championships in 1967, Coombe led his team of Forgues, Patrick and new lead Barry Provost to victory at that year's "Pre-Brier 'Spiel" held in Hull, Quebec, Coombe's first tournament played on arena ice. The following season, Coombe won his second career Royal Victoria Jubilee Trophy. The team qualified for their first provincial championship (second for Coombe) by defeating Fred Jones of Cumberland for the Division 1 title. At the 1968 British Consols, the team made it to the finals, a best-of-three series against Don Gilbert, a dentist from St. Thomas, which they lost two games to one.

Team Coombe made it to provincials again in 1969, after defeating the Jim Moffatt rink from Cumberland in the Division 1 finals. However at the 1969 British Consols, the team lost both of their games in the double knockout event.

The team continued their success into the 1969–70 season, winning the bonspiels at the Navy, and Rockcliffe Clubs, as well as the Commanding Officer's Trophy at the Uplands Invitation bonspiel. The team also won the Hull Cash 'Spiel without Coombe. The team also won their third Royal Victoria Jubilee Trophy that season. The team qualified for their third straight British Consols after winning the Division 1 title over Bill Dickie of Cornwall. At the 1970 Consols, the team made it to the semifinals, where they lost to Joe Gurowka.

Coombe briefly retired from the team for the 1970–71 season to take special courses, with Forgues skipping the rink in his stead, and adding Peter Haime at second. Without Coombe, the team played at a fourth British Consols that season, and won another Jubilee Trophy. Coombe did not take the entire season off however, and with Terry Begin skipping, he won the City of Ottawa Bonspiel grand aggregate championship in March.

Coombe qualified for the British Consols again in 1972, defeating Bob Ford of Peterborough in divisional playdowns. The pinnacle of his career came at the Consols that season, when the Coombe rink defeated Bob Woods of Toronto 9-8 on home ice at the Earl Armstrong Arena in the Ottawa suburb of Gloucester. The game was won at 2:21 in the morning in front of 1,200 spectators in the first Consols played on arena ice. This earned them the right to play at the 1972 Macdonald Brier, Canada's national men's curling championship. They were the first rink from the Ottawa area to do so. At the 1972 Brier, they finished with a 6-4 record, tied for third place with Alberta and Saskatchewan.

Coming off their provincial championship and Brier run, the Coombe rink began the 1972–73 season by winning the CBC-TV series in Winnipeg, defeating World champion Orest Meleschuk in the final, followed up by winning the Dunlop Invitational bonspiel in Whitby. The team qualified for the 1973 Consols by defeating the John McCrae rink from Lindsay to begin their title defence. At the Consols, the team finished the round robin event with a 5–4 record, in fifth place, after losing their last three games. Coombe finished the season by winning the Fisherman's Bonspiel in Kingston, playing third for friend and on-ice rival, Ted Brown.

In 1976, Coombe announced he was taking a "sabbatical" from competitive play, to focus on his family. He returned for the 1979–80 season to play third for the Dave Van Dine rink, curling out of the RCMP Curling Club. The team made the 1980 provincial championships, where Coome was voted all-star third. The team finished in third in the round robin, in a three-way tie, but lost in a playoff to Bob Fedosa of the Annandale Club in Ajax. The team made it to the provincial championships again in 1982, where they lost in the semifinal to the Toronto Avonlea Club's Dave Walker rink. Knee issues forced Coombe into another retirement in 1983, and was replaced by Earle Morris on the Van Dine rink.

=== Seniors ===
In 2002, curling third for Van Dine, Coombe made it to the finals of the Ontario Senior Men's Championship.

In 2005, he won the provincial master's championship (curlers over 60 years old), playing third for Rod Matheson. In 2012, again with Matheson, Coombe won the provincial Grand Masters championship, for curlers over 70.

== Personal life and death ==
Coombe was born at the Hotel Dieu Hospital in Kingston, Ontario, the son of J. H. Coombe and Doris Irene Clyde.

He was a survey technician, working for the Regional Municipality of Ottawa-Carleton, later the City of Ottawa Survey and Mapping Department. At the time of the 1972 Brier, he was working with the Regional Loan Department of the federal government. He briefly lived in Toronto while taking a provincial land surveyors course, and was scheduled to take his final exams at the same time as the Brier.

Coombe died from cancer on May 22, 2026, at the age of 85. He was married to Lynda Jeffrey, and had two children.

== Honours ==
In 2000, Coombe and his 1972 Consols winning team were inducted into the Ottawa Sport Hall of Fame.
