= 1972 Macdonald Brier =

1972 Canada's national men's curling championship

- Host city: St. John's, Newfoundland
- Arena: St. John's Arena
- Dates: March 6–10
- Attendance: 12,890
- Winner: Manitoba
- Curling club: Fort Rouge CC, Winnipeg
- Skip: Orest Meleschuk
- Third: Dave Romano
- Second: John Hanesiak
- Lead: Pat Hailley

The 1972 Macdonald Brier, Canada's national men's curling championship was held March 6 to 10, 1972 at St. John's Arena in St. John's, Newfoundland.

Team Manitoba, who was skipped by Orest Meleschuk easily won the event, after posting a 9-1 round robin record, only losing to Quebec's Bill Kent rink, which finished second. Meleschuk and his rink of Dave Romano, John Hanesiak and Pat Hailley went on to win a gold medal at the 1972 Air Canada Silver Broom World Curling Championship, amidst controversy.

It was the first time St. John's had hosted the Brier. While the total attendance was underwhelming, about 2,500 spectators were on hand to witness the final two evening draws. The event also saw a dearth of quality games, with one scribe stating "[w]ell-played games were the exception rather than the rule," though ice conditions were not the blame. There were also incidents of rules infractions, with some curlers abusing the hogline rule (sliding past the hogline after releasing the rock), with Meleschuk even admitting "[s]ure, I broke it, ... but everybody else was so why stop?", and with some curlers burning stones, with an incident in the Saskatchewan vs. Manitoba game possibly causing the former to lose the game.

Indeed, it was the Manitoba–Saskatchewan game played in Draw 9 on Thursday night that many believed to be the turning point in the event, as both rinks had identical records heading in. The game was a "hard-fought, controversial battle", with the Manitobans winning 7–6. Following the game, Manitoba won their remaining two, while Saskatchewan dropped their final two.

== Teams ==
The teams are listed as follows:

Alberta	British Columbia	Manitoba
Fairview CC, Fairview Fourth: Mel Watchorn; Skip: Jim Fox; Second: Terry Watchorn; Lead: Merv Watchorn	North Vancouver R.C.C.C., North Vancouver Skip: Bernie Sparkes; Third: Brock Giles; Second: Brent Giles; Lead: Brad Giles	Fort Rouge CC, Winnipeg Skip: Orest Meleschuk; Third: Dave Romano; Second: John Hanesiak; Lead: Pat Hailley
New Brunswick	Newfoundland	Northern Ontario
Fredericton CC, Fredericton Skip: Dave Sullivan; Third: John Gorman; Second:Wally Nason; Lead: Wayne Rhodenizer	St. John's CC, St. John's Skip: Fred Durant; Third: Jack MacDuff; Second: Bob Rowe; Lead: Carl Strong	Tarentorus SC, Sault Ste. Marie Skip: Jack MacFarlane; Third: Mike Boyd; Second: Doug Clattenburg; Lead: Dave MacFarlane
Nova Scotia	Ontario	Prince Edward Island
Halifax CC, Halifax Skip: Barry Shearer; Third: Ken Langille; Second: Eddie Morgan; Lead: Robin Wilber	Ottawa CC, Ottawa Skip: Eldon Coombe; Third: Keith Forgues; Second: Jim Patrick; Lead: Barry Provost	Charlottetown CC, Charlottetown Skip: Kip Ready; Third: Bill MacGregor; Second: David Kassner; Lead: Norm MacNeill
Quebec	Saskatchewan
Heather CC, Hampstead Skip: Bill Kent; Third: Art Lobel; Second: Don Aitken; Lead: Murray Gregga	Hub City CC, Saskatoon Skip: Doug Wyatt; Third: Glen Farrell; Second: Murray Trapp; Lead: Dale Zoerb

== Map of teams ==
Provincial Winners

== Round Robin standings ==
Final Round Robin standings

Key
Brier champion

Province	Skip	W	L	PF	PA
Manitoba	Orest Meleschuk	9	1	102	63
Quebec	Bill Kent	7	3	79	73
Alberta	Mel Watchorn	6	4	81	69
Ontario	Eldon Coombe	6	4	89	82
Saskatchewan	Doug Wyatt	6	4	82	75
British Columbia	Bernie Sparkes	5	5	90	89
Northern Ontario	Jack MacFarlane	5	5	91	83
New Brunswick	Dave Sullivan	4	6	72	77
Prince Edward Island	Kip Ready	3	7	72	100
Newfoundland	Fred Durant	3	7	69	85
Nova Scotia	Barry Shearer	1	9	66	97

== Round Robin results ==
All draw times are listed in Newfoundland Standard Time (UTC-03:30).

=== Draw 1 ===
Monday, March 6, 3:00 pm

Team	1	2	3	4	5	6	7	8	9	10	11	12	Final
Saskatchewan (Wyatt)	2	0	0	1	0	0	1	2	0	2	0	3	11
Prince Edward Island (Ready)	0	4	0	0	0	2	0	0	1	0	1	0	8

Team	1	2	3	4	5	6	7	8	9	10	11	12	Final
Quebec (Kent)	0	0	0	1	0	1	0	1	0	0	0	2	5
Alberta (Watchorn)	1	0	1	0	1	0	0	0	0	0	1	0	4

Team	1	2	3	4	5	6	7	8	9	10	11	12	Final
Manitoba (Meleschuk)	1	4	0	1	0	2	0	1	0	0	2	1	12
Ontario (Coombe)	0	0	1	0	3	0	1	0	2	2	0	0	9

Team	1	2	3	4	5	6	7	8	9	10	11	12	Final
British Columbia (Sparkes)	2	2	0	2	0	1	0	1	0	0	1	0	9
Northern Ontario (MacFarlane)	0	0	1	0	1	0	2	0	2	0	0	1	7

Team	1	2	3	4	5	6	7	8	9	10	11	12	Final
New Brunswick (Sullivan)	0	0	1	1	1	0	0	1	0	3	0	4	11
Nova Scotia (Shearer)	0	0	0	0	0	2	2	0	2	0	2	0	8

=== Draw 2 ===
Monday, March 6, 8:00 pm

Team	1	2	3	4	5	6	7	8	9	10	11	12	Final
British Columbia (Sparkes)	0	3	0	0	0	2	0	2	2	0	2	0	11
Prince Edward Island (Ready)	0	0	0	2	1	0	1	0	0	2	0	2	8

Team	1	2	3	4	5	6	7	8	9	10	11	12	Final
Manitoba (Meleschuk)	2	0	0	0	2	0	0	0	0	4	0	3	11
Newfoundland (Durant)	0	1	0	1	0	1	0	0	0	0	1	0	4

Team	1	2	3	4	5	6	7	8	9	10	11	12	Final
Saskatchewan (Wyatt)	0	0	1	0	2	0	1	1	0	3	0	1	9
Nova Scotia (Shearer)	0	1	0	1	0	2	0	0	1	0	2	0	7

Team	1	2	3	4	5	6	7	8	9	10	11	12	13	Final
Alberta (Watchorn)	0	2	0	0	0	3	0	0	2	1	0	0	1	9
Northern Ontario (MacFarlane)	1	0	0	2	1	0	2	1	0	0	0	1	0	8

Team	1	2	3	4	5	6	7	8	9	10	11	12	Final
Ontario (Coombe)	0	4	0	3	0	1	0	0	1	0	0	1	10
Quebec (Kent)	1	0	1	0	1	0	1	1	0	2	0	0	7

=== Draw 3 ===
Tuesday, March 7, 9:00 am

Team	1	2	3	4	5	6	7	8	9	10	11	12	Final
Alberta (Watchorn)	4	0	1	3	1	0	0	1	0	3	2	1	16
Prince Edward Island (Ready)	0	2	0	0	0	2	0	0	1	0	0	0	5

Team	1	2	3	4	5	6	7	8	9	10	11	12	Final
Quebec (Kent)	2	0	0	0	0	2	0	3	0	0	0	1	8
Newfoundland (Durant)	0	1	0	2	0	0	2	0	0	2	0	0	7

Team	1	2	3	4	5	6	7	8	9	10	11	12	Final
British Columbia (Sparkes)	1	0	2	0	1	0	2	0	1	1	1	0	9
Nova Scotia (Shearer)	0	1	0	2	0	1	0	1	0	0	0	1	6

Team	1	2	3	4	5	6	7	8	9	10	11	12	Final
Saskatchewan (Wyatt)	1	2	0	0	2	0	1	0	1	0	0	0	7
New Brunswick (Sullivan)	0	0	2	0	0	1	0	1	0	1	0	1	6

Team	1	2	3	4	5	6	7	8	9	10	11	12	Final
Ontario (Coombe)	3	0	3	0	1	2	0	0	0	2	0	1	12
Northern Ontario (MacFarlane)	0	2	0	2	0	0	1	2	0	0	1	0	8

=== Draw 4 ===
Tuesday, March 7, 2:30 pm

Team	1	2	3	4	5	6	7	8	9	10	11	12	Final
Ontario (Coombe)	0	2	1	2	0	0	2	2	0	2	0	1	12
Prince Edward Island (Ready)	1	0	0	0	1	1	0	0	1	0	1	0	5

Team	1	2	3	4	5	6	7	8	9	10	11	12	Final
Northern Ontario (MacFarlane)	0	0	2	1	0	1	1	3	0	3	0	1	12
Newfoundland (Durant)	1	0	0	0	1	0	0	0	2	0	2	0	6

Team	1	2	3	4	5	6	7	8	9	10	11	12	Final
Alberta (Watchorn)	0	1	0	0	3	0	1	0	0	3	0	4	12
Nova Scotia (Shearer)	0	0	0	2	0	1	0	2	0	0	1	0	6

Team	1	2	3	4	5	6	7	8	9	10	11	12	Final
Quebec (Kent)	1	1	0	1	0	1	0	1	0	1	0	4	10
Manitoba (Meleschuk)	0	0	1	0	3	0	1	0	3	0	1	0	9

Team	1	2	3	4	5	6	7	8	9	10	11	12	Final
New Brunswick (Sullivan)	2	0	1	0	1	0	1	1	1	0	2	1	10
British Columbia (Sparkes)	0	2	0	1	0	1	0	0	0	4	0	0	8

=== Draw 5 ===
Wednesday, March 8, 2:30 pm

Team	1	2	3	4	5	6	7	8	9	10	11	12	Final
Prince Edward Island (Ready)	0	2	1	0	0	2	1	2	0	1	0	3	12
Newfoundland (Durant)	2	0	0	2	1	0	0	0	1	0	1	0	7

Team	1	2	3	4	5	6	7	8	9	10	11	12	Final
Ontario (Coombe)	0	2	4	1	0	1	0	2	0	0	1	0	11
Nova Scotia (Shearer)	0	0	0	0	1	0	3	0	1	0	0	1	6

Team	1	2	3	4	5	6	7	8	9	10	11	12	Final
Manitoba (Meleschuk)	0	3	1	0	1	0	5	0	2	0	1	0	13
Northern Ontario (MacFarlane)	1	0	0	1	0	1	0	1	0	1	0	2	7

Team	1	2	3	4	5	6	7	8	9	10	11	12	Final
Alberta (Watchorn)	0	3	0	1	0	0	2	1	0	1	0	0	8
New Brunswick (Sullivan)	2	0	1	0	0	2	0	0	0	0	1	1	7

Team	1	2	3	4	5	6	7	8	9	10	11	12	Final
Saskatchewan (Wyatt)	1	1	0	2	0	2	0	0	0	1	0	3	10
British Columbia (Sparkes)	0	0	1	0	1	0	1	2	1	0	0	0	6

=== Draw 6 ===
Wednesday, March 8, 8:00 pm

Team	1	2	3	4	5	6	7	8	9	10	11	12	Final
Manitoba (Meleschuk)	0	3	1	2	0	0	0	1	0	0	2	1	10
Prince Edward Island (Ready)	1	0	0	0	1	0	1	0	1	0	0	0	4

Team	1	2	3	4	5	6	7	8	9	10	11	12	Final
Newfoundland (Durant)	2	0	2	0	2	0	1	0	2	1	0	0	10
Nova Scotia (Shearer)	0	1	0	1	0	2	0	2	0	0	0	1	7

Team	1	2	3	4	5	6	7	8	9	10	11	12	Final
Alberta (Watchorn)	1	2	0	1	2	0	0	1	0	0	2	0	9
Saskatchewan (Wyatt)	0	0	1	0	0	3	1	0	2	0	0	0	7

Team	1	2	3	4	5	6	7	8	9	10	11	12	Final
Quebec (Kent)	1	1	0	1	0	0	0	2	0	0	0	1	6
Northern Ontario (MacFarlane)	0	0	1	0	0	1	1	0	0	1	0	0	4

Team	1	2	3	4	5	6	7	8	9	10	11	12	Final
New Brunswick (Sullivan)	1	1	2	0	0	1	0	1	0	0	1	0	7
Ontario (Coombe)	0	0	0	1	1	0	2	0	1	0	0	1	6

=== Draw 7 ===
Thursday, March 9, 9:00 am

Team	1	2	3	4	5	6	7	8	9	10	11	12	Final
Prince Edward Island (Ready)	0	1	0	0	2	0	1	0	1	3	0	1	9
Quebec (Kent)	1	0	0	2	0	0	0	1	0	0	2	0	6

Team	1	2	3	4	5	6	7	8	9	10	11	12	Final
Saskatchewan (Wyatt)	0	3	0	0	0	1	1	0	3	0	0	1	9
Ontario (Coombe)	0	0	1	1	1	0	0	1	0	1	0	0	5

Team	1	2	3	4	5	6	7	8	9	10	11	12	Final
New Brunswick (Sullivan)	0	2	0	0	1	0	0	1	0	1	0	1	6
Newfoundland (Durant)	0	0	1	2	0	0	2	0	0	0	0	0	5

Team	1	2	3	4	5	6	7	8	9	10	11	12	Final
Manitoba (Meleschuk)	0	2	1	0	0	1	0	2	0	0	0	3	9
Nova Scotia (Shearer)	1	0	0	2	0	0	0	0	2	0	0	0	5

Team	1	2	3	4	5	6	7	8	9	10	11	12	13	Final
Alberta (Watchorn)	0	1	0	0	0	2	0	2	0	1	0	0	3	9
British Columbia (Sparkes)	0	0	0	0	0	0	1	0	2	0	0	3	0	6

=== Draw 8 ===
Thursday, March 9, 2:30 pm

Team	1	2	3	4	5	6	7	8	9	10	11	12	Final
Northern Ontario (MacFarlane)	0	3	0	0	2	0	1	3	0	4	0	0	13
Prince Edward Island (Ready)	1	0	0	3	0	1	0	0	1	0	1	1	8

Team	1	2	3	4	5	6	7	8	9	10	11	12	Final
Saskatchewan (Wyatt)	0	3	2	1	0	1	0	0	2	0	0	0	9
Newfoundland (Durant)	1	0	0	0	3	0	0	1	0	1	0	0	6

Team	1	2	3	4	5	6	7	8	9	10	11	12	Final
British Columbia (Sparkes)	1	0	1	0	0	2	1	0	2	3	3	2	15
Ontario (Coombe)	0	2	0	2	3	0	0	2	0	0	0	0	9

Team	1	2	3	4	5	6	7	8	9	10	11	12	Final
Quebec (Kent)	0	2	0	2	0	2	0	2	2	0	0	0	10
Nova Scotia (Shearer)	1	0	1	0	2	0	2	0	0	1	1	1	9

Team	1	2	3	4	5	6	7	8	9	10	11	12	Final
Manitoba (Meleschuk)	0	0	3	0	0	0	2	0	2	0	2	0	9
New Brunswick (Sullivan)	1	2	0	0	0	1	0	1	0	1	0	1	7

=== Draw 9 ===
Thursday, March 9, 8:00 pm

Team	1	2	3	4	5	6	7	8	9	10	11	12	Final
Northern Ontario (MacFarlane)	1	0	2	0	1	0	2	0	0	4	0	1	11
Nova Scotia (Shearer)	0	1	0	1	0	1	0	1	0	0	1	0	5

Team	1	2	3	4	5	6	7	8	9	10	11	12	Final
Manitoba (Meleschuk)	0	1	0	1	0	1	0	2	0	0	1	1	7
Saskatchewan (Wyatt)	2	0	1	0	1	0	1	0	0	1	0	0	6

Team	1	2	3	4	5	6	7	8	9	10	11	12	Final
Quebec (Kent)	0	1	1	3	0	2	0	0	0	0	0	1	8
New Brunswick (Sullivan)	1	0	0	0	1	0	0	1	0	0	1	0	4

Team	1	2	3	4	5	6	7	8	9	10	11	12	Final
Newfoundland (Durant)	0	0	0	1	0	1	4	1	0	3	0	1	11
British Columbia (Sparkes)	1	0	1	0	2	0	0	0	1	0	2	0	7

Team	1	2	3	4	5	6	7	8	9	10	11	12	Final
Ontario (Coombe)	0	2	0	1	0	0	2	0	0	2	0	0	7
Alberta (Watchorn)	0	0	1	0	1	1	0	0	2	0	0	1	6

=== Draw 10 ===
Friday, March 10, 9:00 am

Team	1	2	3	4	5	6	7	8	9	10	11	12	Final
Nova Scotia (Shearer)	0	0	1	0	3	0	1	0	0	1	1	0	7
Prince Edward Island (Ready)	0	0	0	1	0	2	0	1	0	0	0	1	5

Team	1	2	3	4	5	6	7	8	9	10	11	12	Final
Newfoundland (Durant)	0	0	1	0	0	1	1	0	2	0	0	1	6
Alberta (Watchorn)	1	0	0	1	0	0	0	1	0	2	0	0	5

Team	1	2	3	4	5	6	7	8	9	10	11	12	Final
Quebec (Kent)	3	0	0	0	0	1	4	0	0	0	0	2	10
Saskatchewan (Wyatt)	0	0	1	0	0	0	0	2	1	1	1	0	6

Team	1	2	3	4	5	6	7	8	9	10	11	12	Final
Northern Ontario (MacFarlane)	0	2	0	3	1	0	1	1	0	1	0	1	10
New Brunswick (Sullivan)	0	0	3	0	0	1	0	0	1	0	2	0	7

Team	1	2	3	4	5	6	7	8	9	10	11	12	Final
Manitoba (Meleschuk)	2	0	1	0	2	0	0	1	0	2	0	2	10
British Columbia (Sparkes)	0	1	0	1	0	1	2	0	2	0	1	0	8

=== Draw 11 ===
Friday, March 10, 2:30 pm

Team	1	2	3	4	5	6	7	8	9	10	11	12	Final
Manitoba (Meleschuk)	2	1	0	1	2	0	0	2	0	3	1	0	12
Alberta (Watchorn)	0	0	1	0	0	0	1	0	1	0	0	0	3

Team	1	2	3	4	5	6	7	8	9	10	11	12	Final
Prince Edward Island (Ready)	0	0	0	1	1	0	0	1	2	1	1	1	8
New Brunswick (Sullivan)	2	1	1	0	0	2	1	0	0	0	0	0	7

Team	1	2	3	4	5	6	7	8	9	10	11	12	Final
Northern Ontario (MacFarlane)	0	2	0	1	0	1	0	1	2	0	3	1	11
Saskatchewan (Wyatt)	1	0	2	0	1	0	3	0	0	1	0	0	8

Team	1	2	3	4	5	6	7	8	9	10	11	12	13	Final
British Columbia (Sparkes)	0	1	0	1	0	0	2	0	3	0	0	2	2	11
Quebec (Kent)	1	0	1	0	1	0	0	3	0	0	3	0	0	9

Team	1	2	3	4	5	6	7	8	9	10	11	12	13	Final
Ontario (Coombe)	0	1	0	0	1	0	1	0	1	0	3	0	1	8
Newfoundland (Durant)	0	0	2	1	0	0	0	1	0	1	0	2	0	7

== Awards ==
=== All-Star Team ===
The media selected the following curlers as All-Stars.

Position	Name	Team
Skip	Bill Kent	Quebec
Third	Dave Romano	Manitoba
Second	Terry Watchorn	Alberta
Lead	Murray Gregga	Quebec

=== Ross G.L. Harstone Award ===
The Ross Harstone Award was presented to the player chosen by their fellow peers as the curler who best represented Harstone's high ideals of good sportsmanship, observance of the rules, exemplary conduct and curling ability.

Name	Team	Position
Dave Sullivan	New Brunswick	Skip
