= 1952 Macdonald Brier =

Canadian men's curling championship

- Host city: Winnipeg, Manitoba
- Arena: Winnipeg Amphitheatre
- Dates: March 3–8
- Attendance: 12,500
- Winner: Manitoba
- Curling club: Fort Rouge CC, Winnipeg
- Skip: Billy Walsh
- Third: Al Langlois
- Second: Andy McWilliams
- Lead: John Watson

The 1952 Macdonald Brier, the Canadian men's national curling championship, was held from March 3 to 8, 1952 at Winnipeg Amphitheatre in Winnipeg, Manitoba. Winnipeg became the first Canadian city outside of Toronto to host a Brier more than once. A total of 12,500 fans attended the event.

Team Manitoba, skipped by Billy Walsh, became the second team to capture the Brier Tankard in their hometown, as they finished round robin play unbeaten with a 10–0 record. This was the thirteenth time that Manitoba had won the Brier and the eighth time in which a team finished a Brier undefeated. This would also be the first of two Briers won by Walsh, with his other championship coming in 1956.

This was the fifth and most recent Brier in which there were no games that went to an extra end.

== Teams ==
The teams are listed as follows:

Alberta	British Columbia	Manitoba	New Brunswick
Bassano CC, Bassano Skip: Arthur Simpson; Third: Aubrey Gore; Second: Ronald MacLean; Lead: Norman Dalsto	Trail CC, Trail Skip: Reg Stone; Third: Scotty Ross; Second: Maxwell Gordon; Lead: Douglas McGibney	Fort Rouge CC, Winnipeg Skip: Billy Walsh; Third: Al Langlois; Second: Andy McWilliams; Lead: John Watson	Fredericton CC, Fredericton Skip: Victor Limerick; Third: Arthur Limerick; Second: Craig Cartwright; Lead: Richard Malloy
Newfoundland	Northern Ontario	Nova Scotia	Ontario
Corner Brook CC, Corner Brook Skip: J.W. Tomelin; Third: Norman Hood; Second: Alexander Fisher; Lead: Austin Boyd	Kenora CC, Kenora Skip: Jim Guy; Third: Jack Pike; Second: Leo Fregeau; Lead: Raymond Parnell	Truro CC, Truro Skip: Henry Blanchard; Third: Avard Mann; Second: Edward Henry; Lead: Larry Hatfield	Peterborough CC, Peterborough Skip: Ralph Clark; Third: Victor Brown; Second: Kenneth Bissett; Lead: Burritt Harrison
Prince Edward Island	Quebec	Saskatchewan
Charlottetown CC, Charlottetown Skip: Frank Hansen; Third: Christopher Gallant; Second: Charles Kydd; Lead: Harold McInnis	St. George CC, Westmount Skip: Kenneth Weldon; Third: Ches McCance; Second: Joseph Hawkins; Lead: James Turney	Nipawin CC, Nipawin Skip: Frank Hastings; Third: Nels Witherow; Second: Alvin Turner; Lead: Fritz Ostberg

== Round-robin standings ==
Key
Brier champion

Province	Skip	W	L	PF	PA
Manitoba	Billy Walsh	10	0	98	67
Alberta	Arthur Simpson	8	2	111	70
Ontario	Ralph Clark	6	4	89	76
British Columbia	Reg Stone	6	4	105	74
Nova Scotia	Henry Blanchard	6	4	101	80
New Brunswick	Victor Limerick	5	5	83	79
Quebec	Kenneth Weldon	5	5	87	87
Saskatchewan	Frank Hastings	4	6	71	86
Northern Ontario	James Guy	3	7	81	95
Newfoundland	J.W. Tomelin	1	9	69	126
Prince Edward Island	Frank Hansen	1	9	61	116

== Round-robin results ==
=== Draw 1 ===
Sheet A	1	2	3	4	5	6	7	8	9	10	11	12	Final
Newfoundland (Tomelin)	0	1	0	1	0	4	0	0	1	0	0	0	7
Alberta (Simpson)	2	0	3	0	3	0	3	2	0	3	6	1	23

Sheet B	1	2	3	4	5	6	7	8	9	10	11	12	Final
Manitoba (Walsh)	0	0	3	0	1	0	0	0	0	4	0	1	9
Saskatchewan (Hastings)	1	0	0	3	0	0	1	1	0	0	2	0	8

Sheet C	1	2	3	4	5	6	7	8	9	10	11	12	Final
Ontario (Clark)	1	0	1	0	2	0	1	0	0	0	2	0	7
British Columbia (Stone)	0	1	0	2	0	1	0	1	0	0	0	1	6

Sheet D	1	2	3	4	5	6	7	8	9	10	11	12	Final
New Brunswick (Limerick)	2	0	2	0	0	1	0	2	0	1	3	0	11
Quebec (Weldon)	0	1	0	0	1	0	1	0	1	0	0	2	6

Sheet E	1	2	3	4	5	6	7	8	9	10	11	12	Final
Prince Edward Island (Hansen)	1	0	1	2	1	0	1	0	0	1	0	1	8
Northern Ontario (Guy)	0	1	0	0	0	1	0	3	0	0	2	0	7

=== Draw 2 ===
Sheet A	1	2	3	4	5	6	7	8	9	10	11	12	Final
Alberta (Simpson)	0	1	0	0	2	0	0	0	1	0	2	0	6
Nova Scotia (Blanchard)	1	0	1	2	0	1	0	1	0	1	0	1	8

Sheet B	1	2	3	4	5	6	7	8	9	10	11	12	Final
New Brunswick (Limerick)	0	1	0	2	0	1	0	1	0	1	0	0	6
British Columbia (Stone)	2	0	3	0	1	0	1	0	1	0	2	1	11

Sheet C	1	2	3	4	5	6	7	8	9	10	11	12	Final
Newfoundland (Tomelin)	0	0	0	0	1	0	2	3	0	0	3	0	9
Northern Ontario (Guy)	2	1	0	1	0	2	0	0	1	2	0	3	12

Sheet D	1	2	3	4	5	6	7	8	9	10	11	12	Final
Saskatchewan (Hastings)	0	3	2	2	0	1	0	1	0	1	2	0	12
Prince Edward Island (Hansen)	0	0	0	0	1	0	1	0	1	0	0	1	4

Sheet E	1	2	3	4	5	6	7	8	9	10	11	12	Final
Manitoba (Walsh)	0	1	2	0	2	0	1	0	2	1	1	0	10
Quebec (Weldon)	1	0	0	1	0	3	0	1	0	0	0	1	7

=== Draw 3 ===
Sheet A	1	2	3	4	5	6	7	8	9	10	11	12	Final
New Brunswick (Limerick)	2	0	1	0	1	0	1	0	1	0	1	0	7
Ontario (Clark)	0	1	0	1	0	3	0	2	0	1	0	1	9

Sheet B	1	2	3	4	5	6	7	8	9	10	11	12	Final
Manitoba (Walsh)	0	1	0	2	0	1	0	1	2	1	0	1	9
British Columbia (Stone)	2	0	1	0	2	0	1	0	0	0	2	0	8

Sheet C	1	2	3	4	5	6	7	8	9	10	11	12	Final
Quebec (Weldon)	1	0	0	2	3	0	0	2	0	0	2	0	10
Prince Edward Island (Hansen)	0	1	0	0	0	1	1	0	0	2	0	1	6

Sheet D	1	2	3	4	5	6	7	8	9	10	11	12	Final
Saskatchewan (Hastings)	2	0	0	1	0	1	0	1	0	1	0	0	6
Newfoundland (Tomelin)	0	1	0	0	1	0	1	0	1	0	0	1	5

Sheet E	1	2	3	4	5	6	7	8	9	10	11	12	Final
Nova Scotia (Blanchard)	0	0	0	1	1	0	1	0	4	3	1	1	12
Northern Ontario (Guy)	0	2	2	0	0	1	0	2	0	0	0	0	7

=== Draw 4 ===
Sheet A	1	2	3	4	5	6	7	8	9	10	11	12	Final
Alberta (Simpson)	0	0	2	2	0	1	0	1	1	0	2	2	11
Northern Ontario (Guy)	0	3	0	0	1	0	1	0	0	1	0	0	6

Sheet B	1	2	3	4	5	6	7	8	9	10	11	12	Final
Ontario (Clark)	2	0	1	0	1	2	0	1	0	0	0	0	7
Manitoba (Walsh)	0	2	0	2	0	0	2	0	0	1	1	1	9

Sheet C	1	2	3	4	5	6	7	8	9	10	11	12	Final
Saskatchewan (Hastings)	0	0	2	0	0	0	0	0	0	3	1	0	6
Nova Scotia (Blanchard)	2	1	0	0	3	3	1	1	2	0	0	2	15

Sheet D	1	2	3	4	5	6	7	8	9	10	11	12	Final
British Columbia (Stone)	5	1	0	0	1	0	0	5	0	4	1	0	17
Prince Edward Island (Hansen)	0	0	2	1	0	1	1	0	1	0	0	4	10

Sheet E	1	2	3	4	5	6	7	8	9	10	11	12	Final
Newfoundland (Tomelin)	0	0	1	0	0	1	0	1	0	1	0	0	4
Quebec (Weldon)	1	1	0	1	0	0	3	0	1	0	1	1	9

=== Draw 5 ===
Sheet A	1	2	3	4	5	6	7	8	9	10	11	12	Final
Saskatchewan (Hastings)	0	0	1	0	0	0	2	0	0	0	1	0	4
Alberta (Simpson)	0	0	0	3	1	1	0	3	1	2	0	1	12

Sheet B	1	2	3	4	5	6	7	8	9	10	11	12	Final
Manitoba (Walsh)	0	0	2	0	1	1	0	1	2	0	0	1	8
New Brunswick (Limerick)	1	0	0	1	0	0	1	0	0	0	2	0	5

Sheet C	1	2	3	4	5	6	7	8	9	10	11	12	Final
Ontario (Clark)	3	4	1	1	0	4	0	0	0	4	0	3	20
Prince Edward Island (Hansen)	0	0	0	0	1	0	1	0	1	0	1	0	4

Sheet D	1	2	3	4	5	6	7	8	9	10	11	12	Final
Newfoundland (Tomelin)	1	1	0	0	0	0	0	0	1	0	0	1	4
British Columbia (Stone)	0	0	5	1	1	2	2	4	0	2	1	0	18

Sheet E	1	2	3	4	5	6	7	8	9	10	11	12	Final
Quebec (Weldon)	2	0	0	1	0	0	2	0	3	0	0	0	8
Nova Scotia (Blanchard)	0	1	1	0	3	1	0	3	0	2	1	1	13

=== Draw 6 ===
Sheet A	1	2	3	4	5	6	7	8	9	10	11	12	Final
Quebec (Weldon)	1	0	1	0	3	0	3	0	2	0	0	1	11
Alberta (Simpson)	0	5	0	1	0	1	0	2	0	3	1	0	13

Sheet B	1	2	3	4	5	6	7	8	9	10	11	12	Final
British Columbia (Stone)	0	1	0	2	0	2	0	0	0	2	2	0	9
Nova Scotia (Blanchard)	0	0	1	0	3	0	0	2	1	0	0	1	8

Sheet C	1	2	3	4	5	6	7	8	9	10	11	12	Final
Northern Ontario (Guy)	0	0	0	2	0	1	0	2	0	0	1	4	10
Saskatchewan (Hastings)	3	1	2	0	2	0	2	0	3	1	0	0	14

Sheet D	1	2	3	4	5	6	7	8	9	10	11	12	Final
Prince Edward Island (Hansen)	0	1	0	0	0	0	3	0	0	1	1	2	8
New Brunswick (Limerick)	2	0	3	2	1	1	0	0	5	0	0	0	14

Sheet E	1	2	3	4	5	6	7	8	9	10	11	12	Final
Ontario (Clark)	1	0	1	0	1	1	0	0	1	1	2	1	9
Newfoundland (Tomelin)	0	2	0	1	0	0	1	2	0	0	0	0	6

=== Draw 7 ===
Sheet A	1	2	3	4	5	6	7	8	9	10	11	12	Final
Alberta (Simpson)	0	2	0	1	0	2	1	0	2	0	2	0	10
British Columbia (Stone)	1	0	1	0	1	0	0	2	0	2	0	1	8

Sheet B	1	2	3	4	5	6	7	8	9	10	11	12	Final
Prince Edward Island (Hansen)	1	0	1	2	1	0	1	0	1	0	0	1	8
Manitoba (Walsh)	0	3	0	0	0	3	0	4	0	3	1	0	14

Sheet C	1	2	3	4	5	6	7	8	9	10	11	12	Final
Ontario (Clark)	0	0	0	2	0	3	0	2	1	0	0	0	8
Nova Scotia (Blanchard)	1	0	0	0	1	0	1	0	0	2	1	1	7

Sheet D	1	2	3	4	5	6	7	8	9	10	11	12	Final
Newfoundland (Tomelin)	0	1	0	0	0	1	0	0	1	1	0	1	5
New Brunswick (Limerick)	1	0	1	1	0	0	2	2	0	0	1	0	8

Sheet E	1	2	3	4	5	6	7	8	9	10	11	12	Final
Northern Ontario (Guy)	2	0	1	0	1	0	1	0	0	0	2	0	7
Quebec (Weldon)	0	3	0	1	0	1	0	3	0	1	0	2	11

=== Draw 8 ===
Sheet A	1	2	3	4	5	6	7	8	9	10	11	12	Final
Alberta (Simpson)	0	2	1	0	2	0	1	0	3	0	1	0	10
Ontario (Clark)	1	0	0	1	0	2	0	1	0	1	0	1	7

Sheet B	1	2	3	4	5	6	7	8	9	10	11	12	Final
Newfoundland (Tomelin)	0	0	0	0	1	0	0	0	0	3	1	1	6
Manitoba (Walsh)	1	1	2	2	0	2	3	1	0	0	0	0	12

Sheet C	1	2	3	4	5	6	7	8	9	10	11	12	Final
Nova Scotia (Blanchard)	1	0	1	4	0	2	0	1	0	0	2	0	11
New Brunswick (Limerick)	2	0	0	1	1	0	0	0	0	1	0	0	12

Sheet D	1	2	3	4	5	6	7	8	9	10	11	12	Final
British Columbia (Stone)	0	1	2	0	0	1	1	2	1	0	0	1	9
Northern Ontario (Guy)	2	0	0	1	1	0	0	0	0	1	0	0	5

Sheet E	1	2	3	4	5	6	7	8	9	10	11	12	Final
Saskatchewan (Hastings)	1	0	1	0	1	0	1	0	1	0	0	2	7
Quebec (Weldon)	0	1	0	1	0	1	0	1	0	1	1	0	6

=== Draw 9 ===
Sheet A	1	2	3	4	5	6	7	8	9	10	11	12	Final
Alberta (Simpson)	0	1	0	1	1	2	0	1	2	0	1	0	9
New Brunswick (Limerick)	1	0	1	0	0	0	1	0	0	2	0	1	6

Sheet B	1	2	3	4	5	6	7	8	9	10	11	12	Final
Nova Scotia (Blanchard)	1	0	0	0	1	0	1	1	0	0	0	1	5
Manitoba (Walsh)	0	2	0	1	0	2	0	0	2	1	4	0	12

Sheet C	1	2	3	4	5	6	7	8	9	10	11	12	Final
Prince Edward Island (Hansen)	0	0	0	2	0	1	0	1	1	3	0	0	8
Newfoundland (Tomelin)	1	1	2	0	2	0	2	0	0	0	1	2	11

Sheet D	1	2	3	4	5	6	7	8	9	10	11	12	Final
Ontario (Clark)	2	0	3	0	0	0	1	0	0	1	2	0	9
Northern Ontario (Guy)	0	1	0	6	1	1	0	1	2	0	0	2	14

Sheet E	1	2	3	4	5	6	7	8	9	10	11	12	Final
Saskatchewan (Hastings)	0	0	1	0	0	1	0	0	0	1	0	1	4
British Columbia (Stone)	1	1	0	2	1	0	2	1	1	0	1	0	10

=== Draw 10 ===
Sheet A	1	2	3	4	5	6	7	8	9	10	11	12	Final
Manitoba (Walsh)	0	3	0	1	0	2	0	0	1	0	1	0	8
Alberta (Simpson)	1	0	1	0	1	0	2	1	0	0	0	1	7

Sheet B	1	2	3	4	5	6	7	8	9	10	11	12	Final
Quebec (Weldon)	1	0	2	0	2	3	0	1	1	0	0	1	11
British Columbia (Stone)	0	1	0	3	0	0	2	0	0	1	2	0	9

Sheet C	1	2	3	4	5	6	7	8	9	10	11	12	Final
Saskatchewan (Hastings)	0	0	0	1	0	1	1	0	0	1	0	1	5
Ontario (Clark)	0	0	1	0	1	0	0	1	1	0	2	0	6

Sheet D	1	2	3	4	5	6	7	8	9	10	11	12	Final
Northern Ontario (Guy)	0	0	1	0	1	0	0	1	1	2	0	1	7
New Brunswick (Limerick)	2	0	0	1	0	1	0	0	0	0	1	0	5

Sheet E	1	2	3	4	5	6	7	8	9	10	11	12	Final
Prince Edward Island (Hansen)	0	0	1	0	1	0	0	1	0	0	3	2	8
Nova Scotia (Blanchard)	0	0	0	3	0	1	3	0	2	2	0	0	11

=== Draw 11 ===
Sheet A	1	2	3	4	5	6	7	8	9	10	11	12	Final
Alberta (Simpson)	1	0	1	0	2	0	2	2	1	0	0	1	10
Prince Edward Island (Hansen)	0	0	0	1	0	3	0	0	0	0	1	0	5

Sheet B	1	2	3	4	5	6	7	8	9	10	11	12	Final
Northern Ontario (Guy)	1	0	1	0	2	0	0	1	0	1	0	0	6
Manitoba (Walsh)	0	3	0	1	0	2	0	0	0	0	1	0	7

Sheet C	1	2	3	4	5	6	7	8	9	10	11	12	Final
Quebec (Weldon)	0	1	0	3	1	0	0	1	1	0	0	1	8
Ontario (Clark)	1	0	1	0	0	1	0	0	0	3	1	0	7

Sheet D	1	2	3	4	5	6	7	8	9	10	11	12	Final
New Brunswick (Limerick)	0	2	1	0	2	1	0	1	0	2	0	0	9
Saskatchewan (Hastings)	1	0	0	0	0	0	1	0	1	0	2	0	5

Sheet E	1	2	3	4	5	6	7	8	9	10	11	12	Final
Newfoundland (Tomelin)	1	1	0	0	1	0	0	1	0	0	0	0	4
Nova Scotia (Blanchard)	0	0	2	3	0	1	2	0	1	0	1	1	11
