= List of curling clubs in Quebec =

Curling clubs in the Canadian province of Quebec are organized by Curling Quebec into 10 regions.

== East ==
- Club de curling de la Vallée – Amqui
- Club de curling de Rimouski – Rimouski
- Club de curling Murdochville – Murdochville
- Club de curling Rivière-du-Loup – Rivière-du-Loup

== North Coast ==
- Club de curling Baie-Comeau – Baie-Comeau
- Club de curling Forestville – Forestville
- Club de curling Sept-Îles – Sept-Îles
- Club de curling Port-Cartier – Port-Cartier

== Quebec City ==
- Club de curling Nairn – Clermont
- Club de curling Etchemin – Saint-Romuald
- Club de curling Jacques-Cartier – Sillery
- Club de curling Portneuf – Donnacona
- Club de curling Thetford – Thetford Mines
- Club de curling Victoria – Sainte-Foy
- Club de curling les balais verts – Charlesbourg

== Mauricie ==
- Club de curling du Cap – Cap-de-la-Madeleine
- Club de curling Grand-Mère – Grand-Mère
- Club de curling Lanaudière – Notre-Dame-des-Prairies
- Club de curling Laviolette – Trois-Rivières
- Club de curling Aurèle-Racine – Sorel-Tracy
- Club de curling Trois-Rivières – Trois-Rivières
- Club de curling La Tuque – La Tuque

== Saguenay/Lac Saint Jean ==
- Club de curling Chicoutimi – Chicoutimi
- Club de curling Dolbeau – Dolbeau
- Club de curling Kénogami – Jonquière
- Club de curling Port-Alfred – La Baie
- Club de curling Riverbend – Alma
- Club de curling Roberval – Roberval
- Club de curling Saint-Félicien – Saint-Félicien

== Estrie ==
- Border Curling Club – Stanstead
- Club Sportif Celanese inc. – Drummondville
- Club de curling Cowansville – Cowansville
- Club de curling Danville – Danville
- Club de curling Laurier – Victoriaville
- Lennoxville Curling Club – Lennoxville
- Club de curling Magog – Magog
- North Hatley Curling Club – North Hatley
- Club de curling Sherbrooke – Sherbrooke
- Club de curling Sutton – Sutton
- Club de curling Windsor – Windsor

== Montreal ==
- Baie-d'Urfé Curling Club – Baie-d'Urfé
- Club de curling Bel-Aire – Mont-Saint-Hilaire
- Club de curling Boucherville – Boucherville
- Glenmore Curling Club – Dollard-des-Ormeaux
- Hudson Legion Curling Club – Hudson
- Whitlock Golf & Country Club – Hudson
- Lachine Curling Club – Lachine
- Club de curling Laval-sur-le-Lac – Laval-sur-le-Lac
- Mt. Bruno Curling Club – Saint-Bruno
- Montreal West Curling Club – Montréal-Ouest
- Otterburn Legion Memorial Curling Club – Otterburn Park
- Pointe-Claire Curling Club – Pointe-Claire
- Rosemère Curling Club – Rosemère
- Royal Montreal Curling Club – Montreal
- St-Lambert Curling Club – Saint-Lambert
- TMR Curling Club – Mont-Royal

== Southwest ==
- Club de curling Bedford – Bedford
- Club de curling Huntingdon – Huntingdon
- Club de curling Lacolle – Lacolle
- Club de curling Ormstown – Ormstown
- Riverfield Curling Club – Howick
- Club de curling Valleyfield – Salaberry-de-Valleyfield

== Outaouais ==
- Brownsburg Curling Club – Brownsburg-Chatham
- Buckingham Curling Club – Gatineau
- Curling des Collines – Chelsea
- Club de curling Lachute – Lachute
- Club de curling Vallée de la Gatineau (Maniwaki) – Maniwaki
- Club de curling Thurso – Thurso
- Club de curling Shawville – Shawville
- Club de curling Vallée de la rouge – Rivière-Rouge

== Northwest ==
- Club de curling Amos – Amos
- Club de curling La Sarre – La Sarre
- Club de curling Noranda – Rouyn-Noranda
- Club de curling Opémiska – Chapais
- Club Sports Belvédère – Val-d'Or
