= William J. Walsh =

William J. Walsh may refer to:

- William Walsh (archbishop of Dublin) (William Joseph Walsh, 1841–1921), Roman Catholic Archbishop of Dublin
- William J. Walsh (politician) (William Joseph Walsh, 1880–1948), politician in Newfoundland
- Billy Walsh (curler) (William James Walsh, 1917–1971), Canadian curler
