= 1956 Macdonald Brier =

Canadian men's curling championship

- Host city: Moncton, New Brunswick
- Arena: Moncton Stadium
- Dates: March 5–9
- Attendance: 25,800
- Winner: Manitoba
- Curling club: Fort Rouge CC, Winnipeg
- Skip: Billy Walsh
- Third: Al Langlois
- Second: Cy White
- Lead: Andy McWilliams
- Finalist: Ontario (Phillips Sr.)

The 1956 Macdonald Brier, the Canadian men's national curling championship, was held from March 5 to 9, 1956 at Moncton Stadium in Moncton, New Brunswick. A total of 25,800 fans attended the event.

Both Team Manitoba and Team Ontario finished tied for first in round robin play with 8-2 records, necessitating a tiebreaker playoff between the two teams. Manitoba, skipped by Billy Walsh, defeated Ontario in the tiebreaker 8–7 in an extra end to capture the Brier Tankard in what is considered to be one of the greatest Brier finishes of all time. The game would come down to the last rock, as Walsh delivered a perfect shot which snuck past the Ontario guard, then knocked the Ontario shot rock out of play while Walsh's rock managed to bite the 12 foot to capture the Brier championship. Walsh's winning shot was ranked 19th by TSN in their Top 50 Curling Shots of All Time segment.

This was Manitoba's fifteenth Brier championship and the second won by Walsh as a skip, with his first being in 1952. This was the first time in which a championship tiebreaker would go to an extra end and only the second time in which any tiebreaker game would go to an extra end (the other was the second place tiebreaker in 1931).

== Event Summary ==
Heading into the Thursday evening draw (Draw 9), Manitoba was unbeaten with a 7–0 record with Ontario right behind with a 6–1 record while Alberta, Nova Scotia, and Saskatchewan had an outside shot with 4-3 records. On the Thursday evening draw, Alberta would be eliminated with an 11–7 loss to Northern Ontario while Saskatchewan defeated Quebec 11–5. Nova Scotia would defeat previously unbeaten Manitoba 15–4. Ontario took advantage and beat Newfoundland 10–8 to tie Manitoba in the standings heading into the final day.

In the first matches on the final day, Ontario would lose to British Columbia 11-9 opening the door for Manitoba to be in the drivers seat heading into the final draw. Manitoba would do just that as they defeated Alberta 11-5 leaving Manitoba and Ontario as the only two teams that could win the Brier.

In the final draw in the afternoon, Manitoba was sitting with an 8–1 record while Ontario had a 7–2 record. A Manitoba win would have them clinch the Brier outright while Ontario needed a win against Nova Scotia and a Manitoba loss against Saskatchewan to force a tiebreaker playoff that evening. In the final draw, Ontario trailed 9–6 against Nova Scotia with two ends remaining, but Ontario would score five in the eleventh end then steal three in the last end to win 15–9. Saskatchewan handed Manitoba their second defeat of the Brier with a 12–10 win, which forced a tiebreaker playoff that evening between Manitoba and Ontario.

The tiebreaker game between Manitoba and Ontario would be an instant classic. After the first end was blanked, Ontario would strike first with two in the second but Manitoba would counter and tie the game at 2 after three ends. Both teams traded singles the next four ends, but Manitoba would take their first lead of the game at 5–4 with a steal of one in the eighth end. Ontario would tie the game with one in the ninth. Manitoba then scored one in the tenth and stole one in the eleventh to take a 7–5 lead heading into the final end. Ontario would score two in the last end to tie the game at 7. This meant for the first time ever that a tiebreaker playoff to decide a Brier would be decided in an extra end.

Manitoba would have the hammer in the extra end, which would come down to the final stone. With Ontario having shot rock within the four foot in addition of having a rock in front of the house guarding that rock, Billy Walsh would have his work cut out for him prior to his final stone. As he released the stone, it slid past the Ontario guard into the house. The rock then struck Ontario's shot stone, which would roll out of play. Walsh's stone would roll out and would stop just biting the 12 foot to score one and capture the Brier championship in one of the greatest Brier finishes of all time. Walsh's winning shot is still considered one of the top shots in Brier history.

== Teams ==
The teams are listed as follows:

Alberta	British Columbia	Manitoba	New Brunswick
Granite CC, Edmonton Skip: Matt Baldwin; Third: Gordon Haynes; Second: Art Kleinmeyer; Lead: William Henning	Kimberly CC, Kimberley Skip: Harold Jordan; Third: James Livingstone; Second: William Moscovitz; Lead: Donald Beattie	Fort Rouge CC, Winnipeg Skip: Billy Walsh; Third: Al Langlois; Second: Cy White; Lead: Andy McWilliams	Beaver CC, Moncton Skip: Ralph Lister; Third: Horace Trites; Second: Jimmy Vance; Lead: Ralph Patterson
Newfoundland	Northern Ontario	Nova Scotia	Ontario
St. John's CC, St. John's Skip: Robert Goudey; Third: Wesley Hermanson; Second: Norman Pounder; Lead: George Giannou	Copper Cliff CC, Copper Cliff Skip: Steve Kuzmaski; Third: Bill Hudgins; Second: Al Rodin; Lead: George Burns	Truro CC, Truro Skip: Gerald Glinz; Third: Avard Mann; Second: Frank Hoar; Lead: Edward Henry	The Granite Club, Toronto Skip: Alf Phillips Sr. Third: Reginald Mooney; Second: Stanley Jones; Lead: William Leak
Prince Edward Island	Quebec	Saskatchewan
Charlottetown CC, Charlottetown Skip: Wendell MacDonald; Third: John Squarebriggs; Second: Andrew Likely; Lead: Elmer MacDonald	Thetford Mines CC, Thetford Mines Skip: Walter Smith; Third: Edwin Whitham; Second: Henry Foster; Lead: Royce Little	Delisle CC, Delisle Skip: James Hill; Third: Harold Worth Jr. Second: Elmer MacNevin; Lead: Donald Morris

== Round-robin standings ==
Key
Teams to Tiebreaker Playoff

Province	Skip	W	L	PF	PA
Manitoba	Billy Walsh	8	2	106	78
Ontario	Alf Phillips Sr.	8	2	105	79
Saskatchewan	James Hill	7	3	124	81
Nova Scotia	Gerald Glinz	6	4	111	98
Alberta	Matt Baldwin	5	5	87	90
Quebec	Walter Smith	5	5	87	95
British Columbia	Harold Jordan	4	6	98	105
Northern Ontario	Steve Kuzmaski	4	6	93	92
Prince Edward Island	Wendell MacDonald	4	6	89	102
New Brunswick	Ralph Lister	3	7	89	115
Newfoundland	Robert Goudey	1	9	73	127

== Round-robin results ==
All draw times are listed in Atlantic Time (UTC-04:00)

=== Draw 1 ===
Monday, March 5 3:00 PM

Sheet A	1	2	3	4	5	6	7	8	9	10	11	12	Final
Manitoba (Walsh)	0	2	0	3	0	1	2	0	2	1	0	1	12
Quebec (Smith)	0	0	1	0	1	0	0	2	0	0	3	0	7

Sheet B	1	2	3	4	5	6	7	8	9	10	11	12	Final
Prince Edward Island (MacDonald)	0	2	3	0	1	3	0	1	0	3	0	3	16
Nova Scotia (Glinz)	2	0	0	1	0	0	4	0	3	0	2	0	12

Sheet C	1	2	3	4	5	6	7	8	9	10	11	12	Final
British Columbia (Jordan)	0	0	3	0	2	0	4	3	0	0	0	0	12
Newfoundland (Goudey)	1	1	0	1	0	1	0	0	1	3	0	1	9

Sheet D	1	2	3	4	5	6	7	8	9	10	11	12	Final
Saskatchewan (Hill)	1	0	2	0	2	1	0	3	0	1	0	0	10
New Brunswick (Lister)	0	3	0	3	0	0	1	0	2	0	2	1	12

Sheet E	1	2	3	4	5	6	7	8	9	10	11	12	Final
Ontario (Phillips)	1	0	0	1	1	1	1	1	1	1	1	0	9
Alberta (Baldwin)	0	1	2	0	0	0	0	0	0	0	0	1	4

=== Draw 2 ===
Monday, March 5 8:00 PM

Sheet A	1	2	3	4	5	6	7	8	9	10	11	12	Final
Newfoundland (Goudey)	0	0	1	0	1	0	1	0	4	0	1	0	8
Nova Scotia (Glinz)	2	1	0	2	0	2	0	4	0	1	0	2	14

Sheet B	1	2	3	4	5	6	7	8	9	10	11	12	Final
Alberta (Baldwin)	2	1	0	0	1	3	1	1	3	0	0	0	12
Prince Edward Island (MacDonald)	0	0	1	1	0	0	0	0	0	4	3	2	11

Sheet C	1	2	3	4	5	6	7	8	9	10	11	12	Final
Northern Ontario (Kuzmaski)	0	0	1	0	1	0	1	2	1	0	1	0	7
Manitoba (Walsh)	1	1	0	2	0	2	0	0	0	1	0	2	9

Sheet D	1	2	3	4	5	6	7	8	9	10	11	12	Final
New Brunswick (Lister)	0	1	0	1	1	0	0	0	2	1	0	0	6
Quebec (Smith)	1	0	2	0	0	1	0	1	0	0	1	2	8

Sheet E	1	2	3	4	5	6	7	8	9	10	11	12	Final
Ontario (Phillips)	0	1	2	0	2	0	1	1	2	0	1	2	12
Saskatchewan (Hill)	1	0	0	5	0	1	0	0	0	1	0	0	8

=== Draw 3 ===
Tuesday, March 6 9:00 AM

Sheet A	1	2	3	4	5	6	7	8	9	10	11	12	Final
Alberta (Baldwin)	1	0	0	1	0	3	0	3	0	3	1	0	12
Newfoundland (Goudey)	0	1	2	0	1	0	1	0	1	0	0	1	7

Sheet B	1	2	3	4	5	6	7	8	9	10	11	12	Final
British Columbia (Jordan)	0	1	0	1	0	2	0	1	0	1	0	1	7
Nova Scotia (Glinz)	1	0	3	0	3	0	2	0	4	0	1	0	14

Sheet C	1	2	3	4	5	6	7	8	9	10	11	12	Final
Saskatchewan (Hill)	0	1	2	2	2	1	0	4	2	0	0	1	15
Prince Edward Island (MacDonald)	0	0	0	0	0	0	3	0	0	1	2	0	6

Sheet D	1	2	3	4	5	6	7	8	9	10	11	12	Final
Northern Ontario (Kuzmaski)	1	0	0	0	0	1	0	0	0	3	0	3	8
New Brunswick (Lister)	0	3	4	2	1	0	1	2	1	0	1	0	15

Sheet E	1	2	3	4	5	6	7	8	9	10	11	12	Final
Ontario (Phillips)	1	1	0	2	1	0	1	2	0	0	0	1	9
Quebec (Smith)	0	0	3	0	0	1	0	0	2	1	1	0	8

=== Draw 4 ===
Tuesday, March 6 2:00 PM

Sheet A	1	2	3	4	5	6	7	8	9	10	11	12	Final
British Columbia (Jordan)	0	1	0	0	0	2	0	1	0	0	1	1	6
Alberta (Baldwin)	1	0	1	1	1	0	1	0	1	1	0	0	7

Sheet B	1	2	3	4	5	6	7	8	9	10	11	12	Final
Ontario (Phillips)	2	2	0	0	1	1	0	1	2	1	1	0	11
Northern Ontario (Kuzmaski)	0	0	0	2	0	0	3	0	0	0	0	1	6

Sheet C	1	2	3	4	5	6	7	8	9	10	11	12	Final
Manitoba (Walsh)	1	1	0	1	0	3	2	1	2	0	4	1	16
New Brunswick (Lister)	0	0	1	0	1	0	0	0	0	1	0	0	3

Sheet D	1	2	3	4	5	6	7	8	9	10	11	12	Final
Saskatchewan (Hill)	4	0	1	4	2	1	0	2	1	0	4	3	22
Newfoundland (Goudey)	0	1	0	0	0	0	2	0	0	1	0	0	4

Sheet E	1	2	3	4	5	6	7	8	9	10	11	12	13	Final
Prince Edward Island (MacDonald)	1	1	0	1	3	0	1	0	0	2	0	1	0	10
Quebec (Smith)	0	0	2	0	0	4	0	2	1	0	1	0	3	13

=== Draw 5 ===
Wednesday, March 7 2:00 PM

Sheet A	1	2	3	4	5	6	7	8	9	10	11	12	13	Final
Nova Scotia (Glinz)	3	2	0	0	0	1	0	1	0	1	0	1	1	10
Alberta (Baldwin)	0	0	1	1	2	0	2	0	1	0	2	0	0	9

Sheet B	1	2	3	4	5	6	7	8	9	10	11	12	Final
Manitoba (Walsh)	0	3	0	2	2	0	0	1	0	1	0	3	12
Ontario (Phillips)	1	0	2	0	0	2	1	0	1	0	3	0	10

Sheet C	1	2	3	4	5	6	7	8	9	10	11	12	Final
Saskatchewan (Hill)	3	0	2	0	1	0	2	0	1	0	3	1	13
British Columbia (Jordan)	0	1	0	3	0	1	0	1	0	1	0	0	7

Sheet D	1	2	3	4	5	6	7	8	9	10	11	12	Final
Quebec (Smith)	0	0	1	0	2	0	1	0	2	0	1	0	7
Newfoundland (Goudey)	1	2	0	2	0	1	0	1	0	2	0	1	10

Sheet E	1	2	3	4	5	6	7	8	9	10	11	12	Final
Prince Edward Island (MacDonald)	0	0	1	0	1	0	1	0	0	0	4	0	7
Northern Ontario (Kuzmaski)	1	0	0	1	0	2	0	1	1	2	0	1	9

=== Draw 6 ===
Wednesday, March 7 8:00 PM

Sheet A	1	2	3	4	5	6	7	8	9	10	11	12	Final
Prince Edward Island (MacDonald)	0	0	0	1	0	0	1	0	1	0	0	2	5
Manitoba (Walsh)	1	1	2	0	1	1	0	2	0	1	2	0	11

Sheet B	1	2	3	4	5	6	7	8	9	10	11	12	Final
Nova Scotia (Glinz)	0	3	0	0	2	0	3	0	2	1	0	1	12
Saskatchewan (Hill)	1	0	2	1	0	2	0	2	0	0	1	0	9

Sheet C	1	2	3	4	5	6	7	8	9	10	11	12	Final
Newfoundland (Goudey)	0	1	0	1	0	0	0	3	1	0	0	0	6
Northern Ontario (Kuzmaski)	2	0	1	0	3	1	3	0	0	5	1	2	18

Sheet D	1	2	3	4	5	6	7	8	9	10	11	12	Final
Quebec (Smith)	0	0	5	0	2	2	0	2	1	3	0	0	15
British Columbia (Jordan)	2	2	0	1	0	0	1	0	0	0	1	1	8

Sheet E	1	2	3	4	5	6	7	8	9	10	11	12	Final
New Brunswick (Lister)	1	3	0	0	0	1	0	0	1	0	2	0	8
Ontario (Phillips)	0	0	0	1	3	0	3	3	0	1	0	2	13

=== Draw 7 ===
Thursday, March 8 9:00 AM

Sheet A	1	2	3	4	5	6	7	8	9	10	11	12	Final
Manitoba (Walsh)	0	1	0	2	0	1	2	0	1	2	0	0	9
Newfoundland (Goudey)	0	0	1	0	1	0	0	1	0	0	2	2	7

Sheet B	1	2	3	4	5	6	7	8	9	10	11	12	Final
Prince Edward Island (MacDonald)	1	0	1	1	0	1	1	2	0	0	2	0	9
New Brunswick (Lister)	0	1	0	0	2	0	0	0	1	1	0	1	6

Sheet C	1	2	3	4	5	6	7	8	9	10	11	12	Final
Nova Scotia (Glinz)	0	0	1	2	1	0	1	0	1	0	2	0	8
Quebec (Smith)	1	1	0	0	0	1	0	2	0	3	0	2	10

Sheet D	1	2	3	4	5	6	7	8	9	10	11	12	Final
Saskatchewan (Hill)	2	0	3	0	1	0	1	1	1	1	0	2	12
Alberta (Baldwin)	0	1	0	1	0	1	0	0	0	0	1	0	4

Sheet E	1	2	3	4	5	6	7	8	9	10	11	12	Final
British Columbia (Jordan)	0	2	0	2	0	2	0	2	0	2	0	1	11
Northern Ontario (Kuzmaski)	1	0	1	0	2	0	3	0	2	0	1	0	10

=== Draw 8 ===
Thursday, March 8 3:00 PM

Sheet A	1	2	3	4	5	6	7	8	9	10	11	12	Final
British Columbia (Jordan)	0	1	0	1	0	1	0	2	1	0	2	0	8
Manitoba (Walsh)	3	0	1	0	1	0	3	0	0	1	0	2	11

Sheet B	1	2	3	4	5	6	7	8	9	10	11	12	Final
Newfoundland (Goudey)	0	0	2	1	0	1	0	2	0	0	0	0	6
New Brunswick (Lister)	4	3	0	0	1	0	1	0	1	3	0	0	13

Sheet C	1	2	3	4	5	6	7	8	9	10	11	12	Final
Northern Ontario (Kuzmaski)	1	0	0	0	2	0	1	0	1	1	0	2	8
Nova Scotia (Glinz)	0	0	0	1	0	1	0	1	0	0	3	0	6

Sheet D	1	2	3	4	5	6	7	8	9	10	11	12	Final
Alberta (Baldwin)	1	0	2	1	1	0	3	3	0	1	0	1	13
Quebec (Smith)	0	1	0	0	0	1	0	0	1	0	2	0	5

Sheet E	1	2	3	4	5	6	7	8	9	10	11	12	Final
Ontario (Phillips)	0	0	1	0	0	1	2	1	0	1	1	0	7
Prince Edward Island (MacDonald)	1	0	0	1	1	0	0	0	1	0	0	1	5

=== Draw 9 ===
Thursday, March 8 8:00 PM

Sheet A	1	2	3	4	5	6	7	8	9	10	11	12	Final
Manitoba (Walsh)	0	0	0	0	0	1	0	1	0	1	0	2	5
Nova Scotia (Glinz)	0	3	1	1	1	0	5	0	1	0	2	0	14

Sheet B	1	2	3	4	5	6	7	8	9	10	11	12	Final
British Columbia (Jordan)	0	1	1	3	3	1	3	0	3	0	4	0	19
New Brunswick (Lister)	2	0	0	0	0	0	0	1	0	1	0	3	7

Sheet C	1	2	3	4	5	6	7	8	9	10	11	12	Final
Saskatchewan (Hill)	0	2	0	2	1	0	3	1	0	2	0	1	12
Quebec (Smith)	1	0	1	0	0	1	0	0	1	0	1	0	5

Sheet D	1	2	3	4	5	6	7	8	9	10	11	12	Final
Ontario (Phillips)	2	0	0	2	0	2	1	0	0	1	2	0	10
Newfoundland (Goudey)	0	2	1	0	1	0	0	1	1	0	0	2	8

Sheet E	1	2	3	4	5	6	7	8	9	10	11	12	Final
Northern Ontario (Kuzmaski)	1	0	0	2	0	3	0	0	2	0	1	2	11
Alberta (Baldwin)	0	2	1	0	2	0	1	0	0	1	0	0	7

=== Draw 10 ===
Friday, March 9 9:30 AM

Sheet A	1	2	3	4	5	6	7	8	9	10	11	12	Final
Manitoba (Walsh)	2	0	1	0	1	1	1	2	0	3	0	0	11
Alberta (Baldwin)	0	1	0	0	0	0	0	0	1	0	2	1	5

Sheet B	1	2	3	4	5	6	7	8	9	10	11	12	13	Final
Prince Edward Island (MacDonald)	0	0	1	0	2	0	0	1	2	0	1	1	2	10
Newfoundland (Goudey)	1	0	0	1	0	3	1	0	0	2	0	0	0	8

Sheet C	1	2	3	4	5	6	7	8	9	10	11	12	Final
Saskatchewan (Hill)	0	3	0	0	2	0	0	2	2	0	1	1	11
Northern Ontario (Kuzmaski)	2	0	1	2	0	2	1	0	0	1	0	0	9

Sheet D	1	2	3	4	5	6	7	8	9	10	11	12	Final
Nova Scotia (Glinz)	1	2	0	2	0	2	0	1	0	1	3	0	12
New Brunswick (Lister)	0	0	2	0	1	0	4	0	1	0	0	3	11

Sheet E	1	2	3	4	5	6	7	8	9	10	11	12	13	Final
British Columbia (Jordan)	1	0	1	2	0	1	0	4	0	0	0	0	2	11
Ontario (Phillips)	0	1	0	0	0	0	3	0	1	1	1	2	0	9

=== Draw 11 ===
Friday, March 9 2:30 PM

Sheet A	1	2	3	4	5	6	7	8	9	10	11	12	Final
Manitoba (Walsh)	0	1	0	0	3	0	0	2	0	1	0	3	10
Saskatchewan (Hill)	1	0	3	1	0	2	1	0	2	0	2	0	12

Sheet B	1	2	3	4	5	6	7	8	9	10	11	12	Final
New Brunswick (Lister)	0	0	0	2	0	0	1	0	1	3	0	1	8
Alberta (Baldwin)	2	1	1	0	3	1	0	4	0	0	2	0	14

Sheet C	1	2	3	4	5	6	7	8	9	10	11	12	Final
Prince Edward Island (MacDonald)	2	0	2	0	1	1	0	2	0	2	0	0	10
British Columbia (Jordan)	0	1	0	4	0	0	1	0	1	0	1	1	9

Sheet D	1	2	3	4	5	6	7	8	9	10	11	12	Final
Quebec (Smith)	0	0	2	1	0	1	0	0	3	0	0	2	9
Northern Ontario (Kuzmaski)	0	1	0	0	1	0	4	1	0	0	0	0	7

Sheet E	1	2	3	4	5	6	7	8	9	10	11	12	Final
Nova Scotia (Glinz)	2	0	0	1	0	1	0	3	0	2	0	0	9
Ontario (Phillips)	0	0	2	0	3	0	1	0	1	0	5	3	15

== Playoff ==
Friday, March 9

Sheet C	1	2	3	4	5	6	7	8	9	10	11	12	13	Final
Manitoba (Walsh)	0	0	2	0	1	0	1	1	0	1	1	0	1	8
Ontario (Phillips)	0	2	0	1	0	1	0	0	1	0	0	2	0	7
