= Quebec Challenge Cup =

Canadian curling trophy

- Sport: Curling
- Founded: 1874
- Country: Canada
- Most titles: (Quebec) Royal Montreal CC (16)
- Tournament format: Challenge

The Quebec Challenge Cup (French: Coupe challenge Québec) is a curling challenge trophy. It has been continually contested since 1874, and is thought to be the oldest competitive sport trophy in North America, and the second oldest amateur sporting event in the world. It is competed between curling clubs who are members of Curling Québec and the Ottawa Valley Curling Association.

== Format ==
As a challenge trophy, the cup is competed between two clubs: one that currently holds the trophy, and the club that is challenging for it. The competition involves a 10 end "double rink" curling game, where both clubs field two teams to play against the opposing club. The final results are based on cumulative scoring on the two sheets. In the case of a tie, the team that is defending the trophy retains it. The defending team hosts the challenge. There are currently 52 clubs that compete for the trophy, and nine challenges per season, which occur every two to three weeks. Clubs must follow the rotation schedule to compete for the trophy, meaning a wait of 5–7 years per challenge.

The Cup is run by the "Canadian Branch", the former governing body of curling in Quebec, from when it was a branch of the Royal Caledonian Curling Club in Scotland. The Canadian Branch is now a separate curling body that oversees competitions among clubs in the Ottawa Valley Curling Association, the Grand National Curling Club and Curling Québec.

== History ==
The Quebec Curling Club bought a silver trophy meant to "foster inter-club play" among clubs of Canada on January 19, 1874, for $400 or $700. The first competition was held on February 16, 1874, and involved playing 18 ends with iron stones, instead of the granite rocks used in today's curling. The host Quebec Curling Club team, skipped by William Barbour and William Brodie defeated the Montreal Caledonian Club skipped by W. McGibbon and W. Wilson, 56–37 (Barbour defeated McGibbon 23–19, and Brodie defeated Wilson 33–18). The following season, the two clubs faced off again on January 19 with the same skips. The Quebec Club retained the title, defeating Caledonia 58–38 (Wilson winning 23–21 over Brodie and Barbour winning 37–13 over McGibbon). Nine days later, the Caledonian Club finally won the trophy, beating Quebec by a single point, 46–45. The Montreal Thistle Club then won it before Quebec took it back before the end of the season. In its history, the cup has been challenged for over 1000 times. For the 1000th challenge, instead of the regular challenger versus defender game, the event featured eight clubs from the OVCA competing against eight clubs from Quebec, with Quebec winning by a combined score of 70 to 56.

== Traditions ==
The cup involves many alcohol traditions. One such noted tradition is that following the match, the cup is filled with a rusty nail cocktail (Scotch and Drambuie) and passed between competitors. Following the COVID-19 pandemic in Canada, this tradition has been altered, with the drink being poured out into glasses for each competitor instead. Another tradition involves taking a break after five ends to drink, and having the team's leads take a shot of scotch before the game. The host also provides a post-game dinner for both teams.

== Eligible clubs ==
Some clubs no longer exist, but still pay dues to the Canadian Branch and so can still compete. The clubs listed on the rotating schedule are: Cornwall, Ottawa, Windsor, Lennoxville, Montreal West, Hudson Whitlock, Brockville, Navy, Baie-D'Urfé, Winchester, Almonte, Prescott, Border, Mont-Bruno, Glengarry, RCMP, Lancaster, Alexandria, Renfrew, Lachine, Otterburn Legion, TMR, Arnprior, North Grenville, Pembroke, Deep River, Laval-sur-le-Lac, Carleton Place, Carleton Heights, Huntingdon, Ottawa Hunt, Cowansville, Governor General's, Manotick, Lanark Highlands, Pakenham, Pointe-Claire, Morrisburg, Danville, Lacolle, Richmond, Sherbrooke, Celanese, Metcalfe, Bedford, Glenmore, St. Lambert, Sutton, Dalhousie Lake, Ormstown, Bel-Aire and Royal Montreal.
