= Ottawa Valley Curling Association =

Curling regional governing body

The Ottawa Valley Curling Association (OVCA) is a regional association for the sport of curling in the Ottawa Valley region of Eastern Ontario and Western Quebec.

The OVCA was founded in 1957. It has operated a number of bonspiels, most notably the City of Ottawa Men's Bonspiel which occurred every March. It was one of the largest bonspiels in the world, and had been running annually since 1956. In 2010, the open division had 137 teams. All OVCA bonspiels were suspended in 2020 due to the COVID pandemic. As of March 2024, only the Goldline/OVCA Little Rocks Championships and the Brokerlink/OVCA U21 Superspiel have been reinstated.

== Member clubs ==
As of September 2019, all OVCA-member clubs were required to become members of the Ontario Curling Association or Curling Quebec. List last updated Feb 29, 2024.

=== Lanark County ===
- Almonte Curling Club
- Carleton Place Curling Club
- Lanark Highlands Curling Club
- Pakenham Curling Club
- Perth Curling Club
- Smiths Falls Curling & Squash Club

=== Leeds & Grenville ===
- Brockville Country Club
- Gananoque Curling Club
- North Grenville Curling Club
- Prescott Curling Club

=== Ottawa ===
- Carleton Heights Curling Club
- City View Curling Club
- Cumberland Curling Club
- Granite Curling Club of West Ottawa
- Huntley Curling Club
- Manotick Curling Centre
- Metcalfe Curling Club
- Navan Curling Club
- Ottawa Curling Club
- Ottawa Hunt and Golf Club
- RA Centre
- RCMP Curling Club
- RCN (Navy) Curling Club
- Richmond Curling Club
- Rideau Curling Club

=== Prescott & Russell ===
- Russell Curling Club
- Vankleek Hill Curling Club

=== Renfrew County ===
- Arnprior Curling Club
- Deep River Curling and Squash Club
- Killaloe Curling Club
- Pembroke Curling Centre
- Renfrew Curling Rink

=== Stormont, Dundas & Glengarry ===
- Alexandria Curling Club
- Cornwall Curling Centre
- Glengarry Curling Club
- Lancaster and District Curling Club
- Winchester Curling Club

=== Quebec ===
- Buckingham Curling Club
- Curling des Collines
- Lachute Curling Club
- Shawville Curling Club
- Club de curling Thurso

== Governor-General's Trophy ==
The Governor-General's Trophy competition is a dual rink tournament held between the winners of playdowns run between two representatives of the OVCA and Curling Québec. It was established by Lord Dufferin, the Governor General of Canada at the time in 1874 as a dual rink tournament, with the finals played at Rideau Hall until 1939. The event is run by Canadian Branch Curling.

== Quebec Challenge Cup ==
Much like the Governor-General's Trophy, members of the OVCA and Curling and Québec are eligible to compete for the Quebec Challenge Cup, a double rink challenge trophy which has been competed for since 1874. The event is run by Canadian Branch Curling.
