= Curling Québec =

- Sport: Curling
- Jurisdiction: Provincial
- Membership: 66 curling clubs
- Founded: 1976
- Affiliation: Curling Canada
- Headquarters: Montreal

Official website
- curling-quebec.qc.ca
- (Canada)

Curling Québec is the regional governing body for the sport of curling in Quebec. It was founded in 1976 and is one of Curling Canada's 14 member associations.

== Provincial championships ==
Curling Québec hosts nine provincial championships annually:

- Quebec Tankard (Men's)
- Quebec Scotties Tournament of Hearts (Women's)
- Mixed Doubles
- Mixed
- Masters Men's
- Masters Women's
- Wheelchair
- Senior Men's
- Senior Women's

== Other events ==
Along with members of the Ottawa Valley Curling Association, members are eligible to compete for the Quebec Challenge Cup, a challenge trophy which has been competed for since 1874.

== See also ==
- List of curling clubs in Quebec
