= Canadian Pride Curling Championships =

Canadian curling championship

Canadian Pride Curling Championship
- Organizer: Canadian Pride Curling Association (CPCA)
- Established: 2006; 20 years ago
- 2026 host city: Toronto, Ontario
- Website: pridecurl.ca

The Canadian Pride Curling Championships, also known as the Canadian Gay Curling Championships, is an annual national bonspiel organized by the Canadian Pride Curling Association (CPCA). First contested in 2006, by the Curling With Pride league in Edmonton, Alberta, the event features teams representing CPCA members, which are LGBTQ-friendly curling leagues across the country.

== History ==
=== Member leagues ===
There are fifteen leagues that are members of the CPCA, situated in twelve cities in eight out of ten Canadian provinces. The annual championship includes representatives from each city hosting member leagues, with the number of teams from any one city in a given year determined by the previous years' results. Member leagues typically hold their own playdown bonspiels to determine representatives.

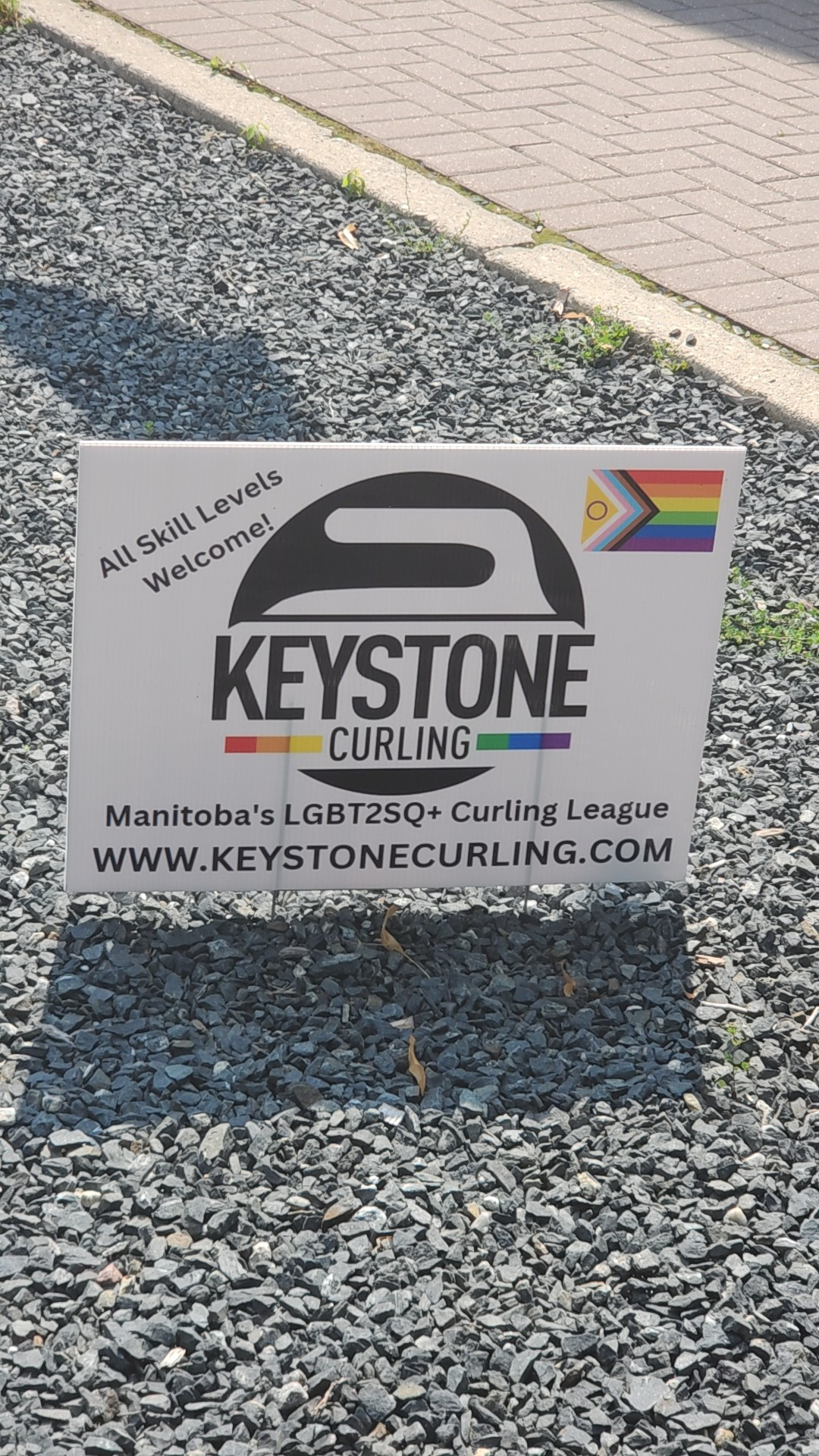
Sign to join the Keystone Curling League

Toronto is home to the oldest and largest member leagues in the country; the Rotators and Riverdale leagues curl out of the Royal Canadian Curling Club in Toronto's Riverdale neighbourhood, with the former established in 1962. The next oldest league is found in Vancouver, where the Pacific Rim Curling League was founded in 1983; it began at the University of British Columbia and now operates out of the Vancouver Curling Club at the Hillcrest Centre, which was constructed ahead of the 2010 Winter Olympics and hosted the Olympic curling events. The leagues in both Toronto and Vancouver have over the years hosted teams from the United States. The 1990s saw leagues established in Alberta's two largest cities, with Apollo Curling launching in Calgary in 1991 and Curling With Pride in Edmonton in 1997. Since the turn of the century leagues have been established in Saskatchewan, Manitoba, Quebec, Nova Scotia, and Newfoundland and Labrador.

Many of the leagues have been credited with revitalizing local clubs and attracting new members and people to the sport. For example, the Pacific Rim league, which grew to be one of the largest curling leagues in British Columbia, helped revive a flagging Vancouver Curling Club in the 1990s; in Ottawa, the Rainbow Rockers league has been credited with consistently attracting beginners to the Ottawa Curling Club and its programs. Many of the leagues across Canada have been started by members moving around the country. The Loose Ends league in Halifax was founded by Curtis Cartmill, who had been a member of Pacific Rim in Vancouver; likewise in Saskatoon, where George Hall moved to the city from Vancouver before helping to launch the Prairie Lily league, and in Winnipeg, where curlers from a number of leagues helped to launch the Keystone.

Many leagues host their own bonspiels throughout the year in addition to the Canadian Championships, such as the Icebreaker in Edmonton, Bison Cup in Winnipeg, the Rock the River Cup in Saskatoon, and the Over the Rainbow bonspiel in Ottawa.

LGBTQ2S+ curling leagues
League	Location	Club	Established
Apollo Curling	Calgary, AB	North Hill	1991
Curling With Pride	Edmonton, AB	Granite	1997
FCSSC LGBTQ2+ Curling	London, ON	Highland Country Club	2023
Keystone Curling	Winnipeg, MB	Granite	2005
Langley Pride	Vancouver, BC	Langley	2023
Pacific Rim Curling	Vancouver, BC	Vancouver (Hillcrest Centre)	1983
Les Fous du Roi	Montreal, QC	Saint-Lambert	2002
Les Phénix	Montreal, QC	Ville de Mont-Royal	2002
Loose Ends	Halifax, NS	Mayflower	2006
Odds & Ends	St. John's, NL	St. John's	2016
Prairie Lily Curling	Saskatoon, SK	Nutana	2014
Queen City Curling	Regina, SK	The Callie	2023
Rainbow Rockers	Ottawa, ON	Ottawa	2002
Riverdale	Toronto, ON	Royal Canadian	1983
Rotators	Toronto, ON	Royal Canadian	1962

=== National Championships ===
After Calgary hosted a Western Cup LGBT curling bonspiel in 2003, leagues from across the country began discussing the formation of a Canadian Gay Curling League; the result of those discussions was the first Canadian Gay Curling Championships, which were hosted by Curling With Pride in Edmonton in 2006. By the time Edmonton hosted the Championships for a second time, in 2014, the bonspiel was buoyed by $20,000 in government support, and Canadian Olympic gold medallist Marc Kennedy threw the ceremonial first rock. At the 2015 event, hosted for a second time at the Royal Canadian Curling Club in Toronto, the first rock was thrown by John Epping—an openly gay curler who has skipped Ontario's Brier entry three times. Winnipeg hosted the 3rd national bonspiel in 2008 only three years after the founding of the Keystone Curling League there; it hosted again in 2016, when Olympians Kaitlyn Lawes and Jill Officer threw the ceremonial first rocks. By 2016, the winning team was awarded $1,000.

After the 2021 Championship was cancelled due to the COVID-19 pandemic, Saskatoon became the ninth city to host the bonspiel in 2022. Halifax—which had been slated to host in 2021 before the event was cancelled—hosted its second national championships in 2023 after previously hosting the first east coast edition in 2013.

Altogether, Edmonton, Toronto, Winnipeg, Montreal, Calgary, Ottawa, Vancouver, and Halifax have each hosted the National Championships twice, while Saskatoon and St. John's have each hosted the bonspiel once.

== Championships ==
CPCC champions
Year	Champion	Skip / fourth	Vice / third	Second	Lead	Host city	Runner-Up
2006	Vancouver	Aaron Thompson	Garrison Kuhlmann	Rob MacDonald	Brian Oldham	Edmonton	
2007	Montreal	Sylvain Bellavance	Ryan Johnson	Stephane Laforge	Alain Lessard	Toronto	
2008	Toronto	Scott Harcourt	Liam Hughes	Stephen Caldwell	Karl Zielbauer	Winnipeg	
2009	Toronto	Scott Harcourt	Liam Hughes	Karl Zielbauer	Stephen Caldwell	Montreal	
2010	Toronto	Scott Harcourt	Liam Hughes	Karl Zielbauer	Stephen Caldwell	Calgary	
2011	Ottawa	Joey Taylor	Mathieu Gravel	Lee Mantha (skip)	Darren McEwen	Ottawa	
2012	Vancouver	Stephen Schneider	Shawn Eklund	Shelly Birston	Glenn Smith	Vancouver	
2013	Vancouver	Stephen Schneider	Shawn Eklund	Shelly Birston	Glenn Smith	Halifax	
2014	Vancouver	Stephen Schneider	Shawn Eklund	Shelly Birston	Glenn Smith	Edmonton	
2015	Vancouver	Christopher Ordog	Aaron Lindgren	Greg Ohashi	Logan Chinski	Toronto	Ingram (Winnipeg)
2016	Vancouver	Aaron Thompson	Jack Holmes	Brian Oldham	Mark Trowell / Gerald Gunn	Winnipeg	Taylor (Toronto)
2017	Saskatoon	Derek Larsen	Darryl Finch	Bryce Lisitza	Jon Rennie / Norm Douville	Montreal	Anderson (Saskatoon)
2018	Ottawa	Joey Taylor	Lee Mantha	Darren Sutherland	Darren McEwen	Calgary	Martin (Toronto)
2019	Toronto	Glen Newell	Lawrence Mudryk	David Jensen	Mark Richardson	Ottawa	Martin (Toronto)
2020	Vancouver	Stephen Schneider	Shawn Eklund	Jason Larence	Brant Amos	Vancouver	Taylor (Ottawa)
2021	Cancelled due to COVID-19 pandemic						
2022	Saskatoon	Dustin Anderson	Avry Cline	Spencer McKnight	Daniel Carriere	Saskatoon	Berg (Vancouver)
2023	Toronto	Bill Francis	Jeff Junke	Stephen Courteau	Ian Kasper	Halifax	Taylor (Ottawa)
2024	Toronto	Bill Francis	Jeff Junke	Stephen Courteau	Ian Kasper	St. John's	Anderson (Saskatoon)
2025	Calgary	Michael Roy	Peter Woolfrey	Brady Gillies	Kreggan Scharnatta	Edmonton	Murray (Regina)
2026	Toronto	Bill Francis	Jeff Junke	Stephen Courteau	Ian Kasper	Toronto	Hiram (Vancouver)

Titles by city
City	Titles	Most recent
Vancouver	7	2020
Toronto	7	2026
Ottawa	2	2018
Saskatoon	2	2022
Montreal	1	2007
Calgary	1	2025
