= Pat Hailley =

Canadian curler (born 1940)

- Curler
- Born: May 19, 1940 (age 86)

Curling career
- World Championship: 1 (1972)
Medal record
Representing Canada
World Curling Championships
Gold medal – first place	1972 Garmisch-Partenkirchen
Representing Manitoba
Macdonald Brier
Gold medal – first place	1972 St. John's

Patrick G. Hailley (born May 19, 1940) is a Canadian former curler. He played lead on the 1972 Brier Champion team (skipped by Orest Meleschuk), representing Manitoba. They later went on to win the World Championships in Garmisch-Partenkirchen of that year.

During the Spring of 1971, Hailley fell victim to Reiter's syndrome, an arthritic disease that hospitalized him for two months, as it paralyzed his limbs. He had written off curling for the next season, but exercised his body over the off-season. An opening on Meleschuk's team allowed for his return.

At the time of the 1972 Brier, Hailley was employed by the Government of Manitoba.
