= Alfred Phillips (diver) =

Canadian diver

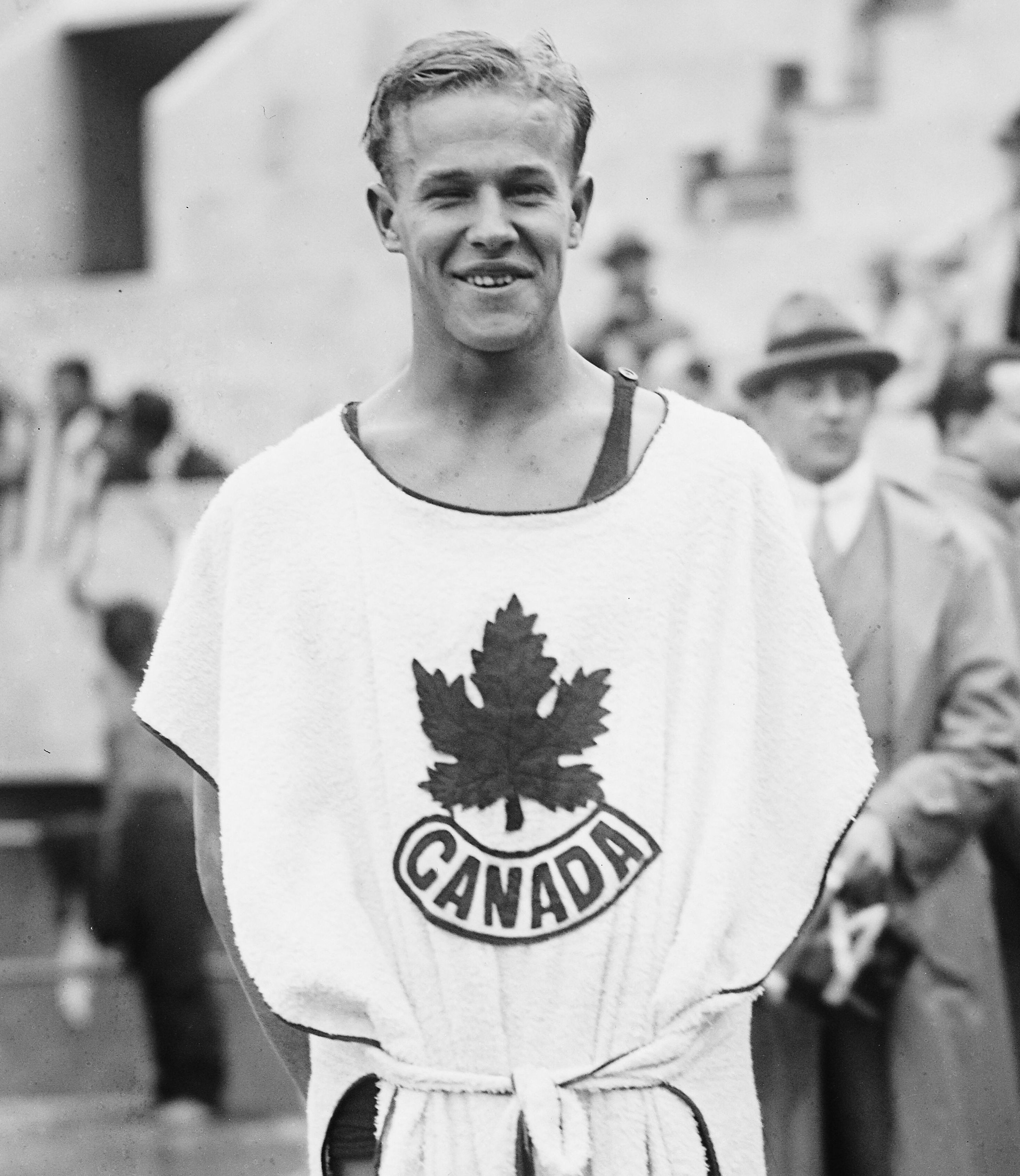
- Alfred Phillips in 1928

Personal information
- Born: July 27, 1908 Durham, England
- Died: July 28, 1994 (aged 86) Toronto, Ontario, Canada
Medal record
Men's diving
British Empire Games
Gold medal – first place	1930 Hamilton	3 m springboard
Gold medal – first place	1930 Hamilton	10 m platform
Men's Curling
Macdonald Brier
Silver medal – second place	1956 Moncton

Alfred Henry Phillips Sr. (July 27, 1908 – July 28, 1994) was a Canadian diver and curler. He competed in diving at the 1928 Summer Olympics and in the 1932 Summer Olympics. He was born in Durham and died in Toronto.

In 1928 he finished seventh in the 3 metre springboard event as well as seventh in the 10 metre platform competition. Four years later he finished fourth in the 1932 3 metre springboard event and again seventh in the 1932 10 metre platform contest. At the 1930 Empire Games, he won the gold medals in both diving events.

Phillips turned professional in 1935, becoming a circus high diver, and toured for the next 15 years.

Phillips was posthumously inducted into the Canada's Sports Hall of Fame in 2015.

His son, Alf Phillips Jr. is a prominent curler, winner of the 1967 Macdonald Brier and bronze medallist at the 1967 Scotch Cup. Phillips Sr. also was an accomplished curler, representing Ontario at the 1956 Brier, and was the winner of the 1969 Canadian Senior Curling Championships, winning in Hamilton, Ontario, the same city he won golds at the 1935 British Empire Games.
