= John Hanesiak =

Canadian curler (born 1941)

- Curler
- Born: June 23, 1941 (age 85)
Medal record
Representing Canada
World Curling Championships
Gold medal – first place	1972 Garmisch-Partenkirchen
Representing Manitoba
Macdonald Brier
Gold medal – first place	1972 St. John's

John R. Hanesiak (born June 23, 1941) is a Canadian former curler. He played second on the 1972 Brier Champion team (skipped by Orest Meleschuk), representing Manitoba. They later went on to win the World Championships in Garmisch-Partenkirchen of that year.

Hanesiak is of Irish and Ukrainian descent. He played college football for North Dakota State University, but turned down an offer from the Montreal Alouettes, believing he was too small. At the time of the 1972 Brier, he was employed as a salesman.
