= Dave Romano =

Canadian curler

- Curler
- Born: June 1, 1940 (age 86)
Medal record
Representing Canada
World Curling Championships
Gold medal – first place	1972 Garmisch-Partenkirchen
Representing Manitoba
Macdonald Brier
Gold medal – first place	1972 St. John's

David G. Romano (born June 1, 1940) is a Canadian former curler. He played third on the 1972 Brier Champion team (skipped by Orest Meleschuk), representing Manitoba. They later went on to win the World Championships in Garmisch-Partenkirchen of that year.

At the time of the 1972 Brier, Romano was employed as an architect.
