= John Watson (curler) =

Canadian curler

Johnny Watson
- Curler
- Born: c. 1914; St. James, Manitoba
- Died: February 18, 1974 (aged 60); Winnipeg, Manitoba
Medal record
Men's curling
Representing Manitoba
Macdonald Brier
Gold medal – first place	1952 Winnipeg

John Watson (c. 1914 – February 18, 1974) was a Canadian curler. He was the lead on the Billy Walsh rink that won the Brier Championship for Manitoba 1952. He was married to Alma and had a son, Jack. He died after a long illness in 1974
