= Andy McWilliams =

Canadian curler

- Curler
- Born: October 16, 1916; Rathwell, Manitoba
- Died: March 23, 1995 (aged 78); Winnipeg, Manitoba
Medal record
Men's curling
Representing Manitoba
Macdonald Brier
Gold medal – first place	1952 Winnipeg
Gold medal – first place	1956 Moncton

Andrew A. McWilliams (October 16, 1916 – March 23, 1995) was a Canadian curler. He played on the Billy Walsh rink that won two Brier Championships for Manitoba, in 1952 and 1956.
