= Al Langlois (curler) =

Canadian curler

- Curler
- Born: August 4, 1915; Fort Rouge, Winnipeg, Manitoba
- Died: January 30, 2005 (aged 89); Winnipeg, Manitoba
Medal record
Men's curling
Representing Manitoba
Macdonald Brier
Gold medal – first place	1952 Winnipeg
Gold medal – first place	1956 Moncton

Allan David Langlois (August 4, 1915 – January 30, 2005) was a Canadian curler He was the third on the Billy Walsh rink that won two Brier Championships for Manitoba, in 1952 and 1956.
