= Cy White =

Canadian curler

- Curler
- Born: 1915
- Died: April 4, 1979 (aged 63–64); Ontario, Canada
Medal record
Men's curling
Representing Manitoba
Macdonald Brier
Gold medal – first place	1956 Moncton

Thomas Cyril "Cy" White (1915 – August 4, 1979) was a Canadian curler. He was the second on the Billy Walsh rink that won the Brier Championship for Manitoba 1956. He was a post office employee in Winnipeg. He was married to Winnifred and had three children.
