= Billy Walsh (curler) =

Canadian curler (1917–1971)

- Curler
- Born: January 20, 1917; Haileybury, Ontario
- Died: October 7, 1971 (aged 54); Winnipeg, Manitoba

Curling career
- Member Association: Manitoba
Medal record
Men's curling
Representing Manitoba
Macdonald Brier
Gold medal – first place	1952 Winnipeg
Gold medal – first place	1956 Moncton

William James Walsh (January 20, 1917 – October 7, 1971) was a Canadian curler from Winnipeg, Manitoba. Walsh was a two time Canadian champion skip, having won the Brier for Manitoba in 1952 and 1956.

Walsh was born in 1917 in Ontario and moved to Winnipeg as an infant. After graduating from high school, he worked at the Comptroller General's office for the Government of Manitoba, where he worked for the rest of his life. He served with the Royal Winnipeg Rifles during World War II.

Walsh won his first of two national championships at the 1952 Macdonald Brier in Winnipeg. The Walsh rink, which included Al Langlois, Andy McWilliams and John Watson, went undefeated at the event, winning all ten matches. They clinched the event in their second last game, when they beat Alberta's Art Simpson, 9-7. Simpson had up until then just lost one match, and a win could have forced a tie breaker for the championship.

At the 1956 Macdonald Brier, the Walsh rink finished the round robin with a record of 8-2, tied with Ontario's Alf Phillips. This forced a one game playoff to determine the champion between the two rinks. Walsh won the match 8-7, in an extra end in front of 3200 fans at Moncton Stadium to capture his second national title. Walsh's 1956 team consisted of Langlois, Cy White and McWilliams.

Walsh died in 1971 after a long illness. He was inducted into the Canadian Curling Hall of Fame in 1975.
