= Royal Montreal Curling Club =

Canadian curling club

Royal Montreal Curling Club Club de Curling Royal Montréal
- Interactive map of Royal Montreal Curling Club
- Location: 1850 De Maisonneuve Boulevard West; Montreal, Quebec, Canada; 45.4937128°N 73.5811574°W

Information
- Established: January 27, 1807
- Curling Canada region: Quebec
- Website: www.royalmontrealcurling.ca

The Royal Montreal Curling Club (French: Club de Curling Royal Montréal) is the oldest curling club in North America, established on January 27, 1807 by a group of Scottish Canadian immigrants in Montreal.

The group met at the Gillis Tavern to lay down the rules of the organization. Thirty years later, the group built Canada's first indoor ice rink.

In addition to its status as the oldest curling club on the continent, the Royal Montreal Curling Club is also the oldest active sports club in North America.

The 1929 clubhouse on de Maisonneuve was designed by Percy Erskine Nobbs and George Taylor Hyde.

Games at the club in 1905

Clubhouse in 2007, celebrating the club's anniversary

Commemorative plaque at the clubhouse

== See also ==
- Milwaukee Curling Club, oldest continuously operating curling club in the United States
