= Ottawa Curling Club =

Curling club in Ottawa

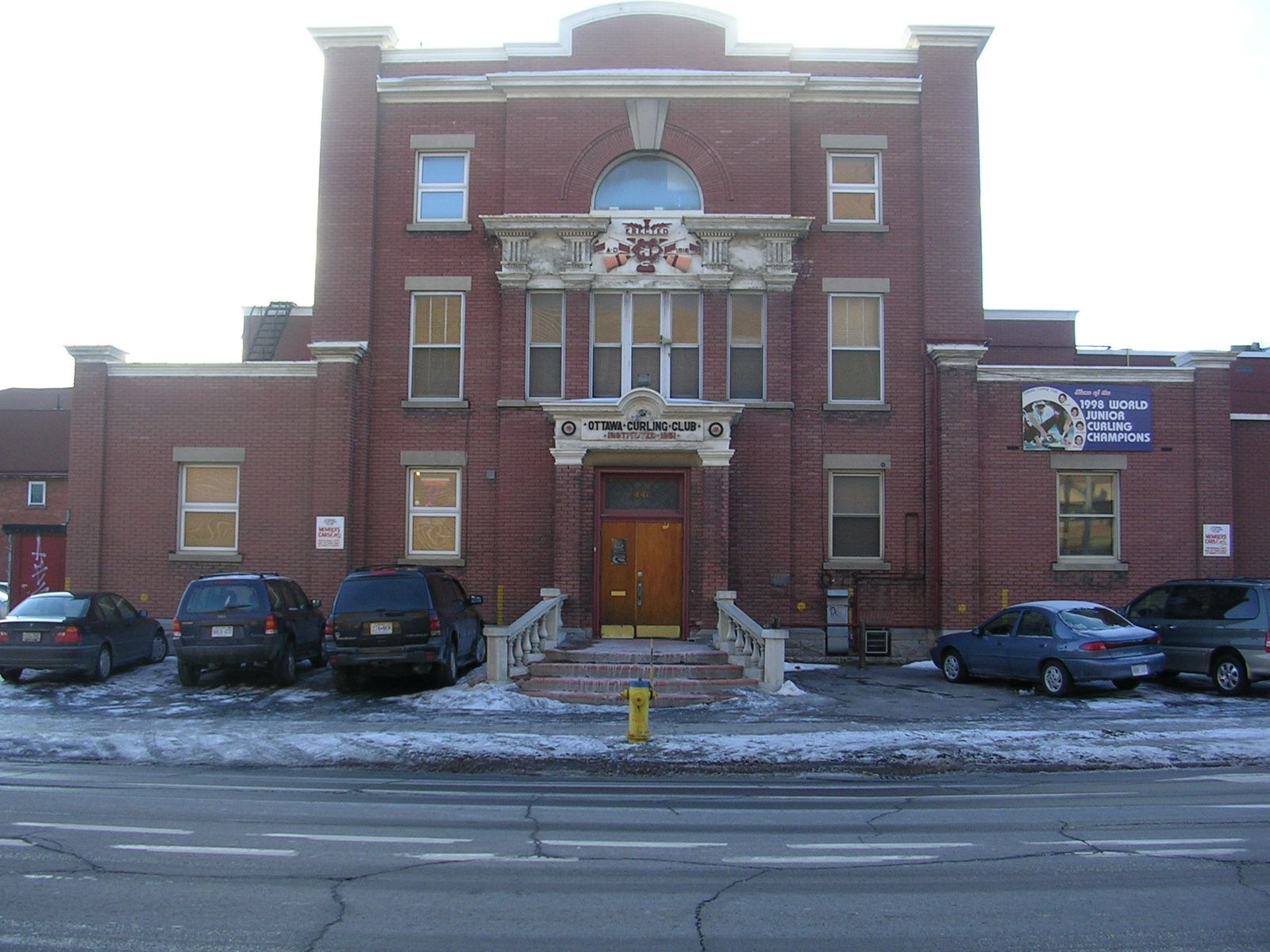
- Entrance to the club.
- Interactive map of Ottawa Curling Club
- Location: 440 O'Connor Street; Ottawa, Ontario; K2P 1W4; 45°24′39″N 75°41′25″W

Information
- Established: 1851
- Founder: Allan Gilmour
- Club type: Dedicated Ice
- Curling Canada region: OCA Zone 1
- Sheets of ice: Five
- Rock colours: Red and Yellow
- Website: www.ottawacurlingclub.ca

The Ottawa Curling Club is an historic curling club located on O'Connor Street in the Centretown neighbourhood of Ottawa, Ontario, Canada. It is the oldest curling club in Ottawa, established in 1851 by Allan Gilmour as the Bytown Curling Club. The Club first played on the Rideau Canal until 1858. It subsequently moved to different locations around the city until finally settling at its current location on O'Connor in 1916. In 1931 the club was expanded to the current capacity of 5 curling sheets. Artificial ice was also installed at that time.

The club is home to 2018 Olympians and 2017, 2024, and 2025 World Champions Rachel Homan and Emma Miskew, and is the former home of 1998 and 1999 Junior Men's World Curling Champion and 2018 and 2022 Olympian (with Homan) John Morris. The Ottawa Curling Club is one of two clubs in Downtown Ottawa, the other is the Rideau Curling Club, which maintains a rivalry with the Ottawa.

== History ==
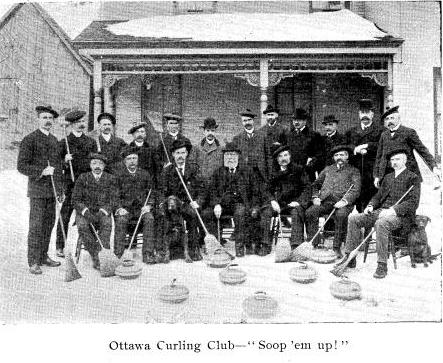
Ottawa Curling Club, 1904

The By Town Curling Club was established in 1851 under the presidency of lumber businessman Allan Gilmour. Its earliest facility was a rudimentary shed located near Lisgar Street adjoining the Rideau Canal. Canal water was used to construct the single ice sheet. The club constructed a new rink on Albert Street east of O'Connor in 1867, expanding play to two sheets. In 1878, the club spent $510 to move the building structure to a property near Wellington Street west of Kent on the former Vittoria Street which is today federal property in the Supreme Court district. The rink structure was replaced by a brick building which opened in December 1906. In 1914, the club lost the land due to a significant federal government expropriation.

The club's present location was opened in December 1916 when premises on O'Connor Street were provided through a gift by James Manuel, a wealthy local businessman, curler and club president. In 1927, the club was threatened with eviction by Toronto General Trusts which represented Manuel's estate at that time. The club maintained that the terms of agreement with Manuel that it had rightful control of the property as long as the facilities were maintained for curling. In the following year, the courts ruled that the club had no formal claim to the property due to the club's unincorporated status at that time, combined with the lack of a written will or agreement regarding Manuel's wishes. The club therefore was required to purchase the property from the estate.

Formal incorporation of the Ottawa Curling Club Limited was completed in 1929. Artificial ice and expansion from four to five sheets followed in 1931.

=== Presidents ===
1. 1851–1895: Col. Allan Gilmour
2. 1895–1914: John Manuel
3. 1914–1917: James Manuel
4. 1918–1921: William Manuel
5. 1922–1936: George F. Henderson, KC
6. 1936–1942: Hugh Carson
7. 1942–1950: Darcy Finn
8. 1950–1952: Olin Beach
9. 1952–1955: W.E. Hodgins
10. 1955–1958: Ted Moffat
11. 1958–1961: B. Brocklesby
12. 1961–1963: Howard Grills
13. 1964–1966: Alan Brown
14. 1966–1968: Gordie Perry
15. 1968–1970: Harold Scrim
16. 1970–1972: Bill Davis
17. 1972–1974: E. Macdonald
18. 1974–1976: Don MacKinnon
19. 1976–1978: Dick Rich
20. 1978–1980: Dave Smith
21. 1980–1982: Stan Grover
22. 1982–1984: Ted Root
23. 1984–1986: Pat Craig
24. 1986–1988: Bob York
25. 1988–1990: Rod Matheson
26. 1990–1992: Sandra Chisholm
27. 1992–1994: Brad Shinn
28. 1994–1996: Steve Mitchell
29. 1996–1998: Eric Johannsen
30. 1998–2000: Barbara Brown
31. 2000–2002: Terry Clark
32. 2002–2004: Gord Perry
33. 2004–2006: Gayle Greene
34. 2006–2008: Gord Critch
35. 2008–2012: Geoff Colley
36. 2012–2014: Michael Loewen
37. 2014–2016: Tom Sinclair
38. 2016–2018: Matthew Kellett
39. 2018–2020: Eddie Chow
40. 2020–2022: Michael Burke
41. 2022–2024: Nicole Merriman
42. 2024–present: Alex Birtwistle

== Leagues ==
The Ottawa Curling Club has a number of different curling leagues that participate at the club. Some are club leagues, while others (like the teachers league or the Rainbow Rockers Curling League) are rentals. Official leagues at the club are the Monday Ladder (open), Business Women (Tuesday), Getting Started/Learn to Curl (Tuesday), Open Cash (Wednesday), Business Men (Thursday), Mixed (Friday), Saturday Open, Daytime League, and Colts (under 5 years of experience).

=== Cash League ===
The cash league which runs Wednesday evenings is the league with the highest calibre of curling. Some of the top curlers in the world curl in the cash league at the Ottawa Curling Club. Winners of games receive money, which can vary depending on the level the teams involved are at. The league is open, so there are both men's and women's teams. Curlers in the OCC Cash league include Craig Savill, Lynn Kreviazuk, David Mathers, Lee Merklinger, Erin Morrissey, Jean-Michel Ménard, Jenn Hanna, Julia Weagle, Adam Kingsbury and Kevin Folk.

=== University / College League ===
From the 2006–07 to the 2024–25 season, the club ran a league on Sunday nights for students in the Ottawa area to participate. Prior to 2006–07, no university in the city had a curling team, so this league was created to facilitate interest in curling from students in the city. At the end of the year first season, a championship was played between Carleton University and the University of Ottawa with Carleton winning 6–4.

== Club Champions ==
The club championship is held annually. It is a playoff round featuring the top teams from each of the leagues at the club.

Previous winners have included Earle Morris (1996, 2000), Ian MacAulay (1997, 1998, 1999, 2002, 2014), Bryan Cochrane (1997, 1998, 1999, 2002), Jean-Sébastien Roy (2004), Jean-Michel Ménard (2004), Eldon Coombe (2008), Craig Savill (2009), Lee Merklinger (2015), David Mathers (2015, 2024), Wesley Forget (2022).

== Inter-club competitions ==
The club plays in several longstanding competitions against other clubs in the area:

The club competes against the Buckingham Curling Club in the Currier Cup, which began in the 1860s, making it one of the oldest curling trophies in the world. At the time, the two clubs were the only ones in the Ottawa area. The trophy was donated by Joseph Merrill Currier, local Member of Parliament.

The club competes against the Rideau Curling Club in the "Ottawa–Rideau Challenge", an event which began on 9 January 1909. The challenge was held 20 times between 1909 and 1913, and was not revived until 1987. It has been held regularly on an annual basis ever since, and is usually held between Christmas and New Years.

As a member of the Canadian Branch, the club also competes in the Quebec Challenge Cup which began in 1874. The club has won the cup in 1878–79, 1882–84, 1891–95, 1906, 1908, 1923–24, 1934, 1950–51, 1957, 2016 and 2023–24. The club first competed for the Cup in 1877, and won 58 games between then and 1957.

== Famous past members ==
- Sir Sanford Fleming, inventor of standard time
- Alexander Mackenzie, former Prime Minister of Canada
- John Morris & Brent Laing, 1998 & 1999 World Junior Champions
- Brad Gushue - Alternate for John Morris at the 1998 World Junior Championships (Member in name only)
- Melanie Robillard - curled with Jenn Hanna in 2000 and as part of the German National Team with Andrea Schöpp won the 2008 European Mixed Championships Kitzbühel, Austria, won the 2009 Women European Championships Aberdeen, Scotland, participated with the German National Team that finished 6th in the Women Curling event at the Olympics in Vancouver and was part of the German Women National Curling Team that won the Women World Curling Championships Swift Current, Saskatchewan, Canada
- Markku Uusipaavalniemi - skip of the 2006 Olympic silver medallist Finnish team
- Hugh Millikin - skip of the Australian national team
- Roy Ananny - Canadian Football League player
- Ian Palangio - Australian curler.

== Events ==
The Ottawa and Rideau Curling Clubs used to host the John Shea Insurance Canada Cup Qualifier. In 2003, both clubs hosted the 2003 Canadian Junior Curling Championships. The club also hosted the 2006 and 2007 Canadian Blind Curling Championships. The Club and the Rainbow Rockers league hosted the Canadian Gay Curling Championships twice, in 2011 and in 2019.

== Provincial champions ==
Year	Event	Skip	Third	Second	Lead	Record at Nationals	Record at Worlds
1972	Women's Juniors	Judy Jamieson	Debbie Grant	Lynn Britt	Denise Allan	T3rd (4–3)	-
1972	British Consols	Eldon Coombe	Keith Forgues	Jim Patrick	Barry Provost	4th (6–4)	N/A
1979	Men's Masters	Ted Root	Ralph Smith	Bob Martin	Elwyn MacDonald	N/A	N/A
1985	Intermediate Men's	Russ Taylor	Bruce Lonsbery	Al Reed	Jack Casserly	N/A	N/A
1990	Men's Masters	Ken Hart	Roy James	Cec Morris	Rae Brown	N/A	N/A
1993	Silver Tankard	Brad Shinn; Ian MacAulay	John Theriault; Bill Gamble	Dave Korim; Richard Groulx	Geoff Colley; Barry Conrad	N/A	N/A
1993	Challenge	Terry Clark	Jack Casserly	Wayne Lennon	Ian MacAulay	N/A	N/A
1995	Men's Colts	Ken Campbell	John Galligan	James Sutherland	Steve O'Brien	N/A	N/A
1997	Men's Masters	Rod Matheson	Jack Ross	Bob McKenzie	Gord Cummings	N/A	N/A
1997	Senior Mixed	Paul Engelbrecht	Bonnie Matheson	Rod Matheson	Darlene Engelrecht	N/A	N/A
1997	Men's Juniors	John Morris	Craig Savill	Matt St. Louis	Mark Homan	2nd (10–6)	
1998	Women's Juniors	Jenn Hanna	Amanda Vanderspank	Julie Colquhoun	Stephanie Hanna	2nd (10–3)	-
1998	Men's Juniors	John Morris	Craig Savill	Andy Ormsby	Brent Laing	1st (12–3)	1st (11–0)
1999	Women's Trophy	Laurie Shields	Barb Wheatley	Andrea Leganchuk	Sandra Ribey	N/A	N/A
1999	Men's Juniors	John Morris	Craig Savill	Jason Young	Brent Laing	1st (11–4)	1st (10–1)
2000	Senior Mixed	Reg Plaster	Donna Lamoureux	Randy Garland	Dianne Sullivan	N/A	N/A
2002	Women's Trophy	Eveline Shaw	Laurie Shields	Andrea Leganchuk	Sue Kollar	N/A	N/A
2002	Women's Tankard	Eveline Shaw; Joyce Potter	Laurie Shields; Muriel Potter	Margaret Pross; Janelle Sadler	Sue Kollar; Faye Linseman	N/A	N/A
2003	Senior Mixed	Randy Garland	Eveline Shaw	Roger Shaw	Margaret Pross	N/A	N/A
2003	Senior Women's	Joyce Potter	Muriel Potter	Janelle Sadler	Faye Linseman	3rd (9–3)	-
2005	Men's Masters	Rod Matheson	Eldon Coombe	Ron Brown	Georges Bourgon	3rd (5–3)	N/A
2005	Scott Tournament of Hearts	Jenn Hanna	Pascale Letendre	Dawn Askin	Stephanie Hanna	2nd (11–6)	-
2009	Women's Juniors	Rachel Homan	Emma Miskew	Alison Kreviazuk	Lynn Kreviazuk	2nd (10–3)	-
2010	Women's Juniors	Rachel Homan	Emma Miskew	Laura Crocker	Lynn Kreviazuk	1st (13–0)	2nd (9–2)
2011	Men's Juniors	Mathew Camm	Scott Howard	David Mathers	Andrew Hamilton	2nd (12–4)	-
2011	Scotties Tournament of Hearts	Rachel Homan	Emma Miskew	Alison Kreviazuk	Lisa Weagle	4th (9–5)	-
2011	Men's Masters	Layne Noble	Rick Bachand	Randy Garland	Cal Hegge	3rd (6–2)	N/A
2012	Men's Seniors	Brian Lewis	Jeff McCrady	Steve Doty	Graham Sinclair	3rd (8–4)	-
2012	Men's Grand Masters	Rod Matheson	Eldon Coombe	Jamie Angus	John Lockett		
2013	Scotties Tournament of Hearts	Rachel Homan	Emma Miskew	Alison Kreviazuk	Lisa Weagle	1st (12–1) (Note: As Scotties champions, the Homan rink represented Canada at the 2014 Scotties Tournament of Hearts, without having to play in the women's provincials.)	3rd (9–4)
2014	Tim Hortons Colts	Kevin Rathwell	Terry Scharf	Graham Rathwell	Ian Rathwell		
2014	Silver Tankard	Don Bowser; Chris Gardner	Jonathan Beuk; Mike McLean	Spencer Cooper; Jeff Guignard	Nick Catizzone; Andrew Hamilton		
2015	Mixed	Chris Gardner	Trish Hill	Jonathan Beuk	Jessica Barcauskas	3rd (9–3)	-
2015	Men's Seniors	Jeff McCrady	Brian Lewis	Mike Johansen	Graham Sinclair	5th (7–3)	-
2016	Mixed	Mike McLean	Brit O'Neill	Andrew Denny-Petch	Karen Sagle	9th (6–3)	-
2016	Scotties Tournament of Hearts	Jenn Hanna	Brit O'Neill	Stephanie Hanna	Karen Sagle	6th (6–5)	-
2017	Scotties Tournament of Hearts	Rachel Homan	Emma Miskew	Joanne Courtney	Lisa Weagle	1st (12–2)	1st (13–0)
2017	Men's Colts	Sebastien Robillard	Ryan McCrady	Bowie Abbis-Mills	Andrew Denny-Petch		
2017	Intermediate Men's	Spencer Cooper	Don Bowser	Steve Allen	Rick Allen	N/A	
2018	Women's Juniors	Emma Wallingford	Grace Holyoke	Lindsay Dubue	Hannah Wallingford	5th (6–4)	
2019	Scotties Tournament of Hearts	Rachel Homan	Emma Miskew	Joanne Courtney	Lisa Weagle	2nd (10–4)	
2020	Scotties Tournament of Hearts	Rachel Homan	Emma Miskew	Joanne Courtney	Lisa Weagle	2nd (11–3)	
2021* (Note: Due to the COVID-19 pandemic, the Ontario Scotties were cancelled. Team Homan were chosen by CurlON to represent Ontario at the 2021 Scotties)	Scotties Tournament of Hearts	Rachel Homan	Emma Miskew	Sarah Wilkes	Joanne Courtney	2nd (10–3)	
2021	Mixed	Mike McLean	Erin Morrissey	Kevin Tippett	Erica Hopson	2nd (8–4)	-
2022* (Note: Due to the COVID-19 pandemic, the Ontario Scotties were postponed. Team Homan won the Ontario Scotties after 2022 Scotties, but played in the Scotties as "Wild Card #3" without Homan.)	Scotties Tournament of Hearts	Rachel Homan	Emma Miskew	Sarah Wilkes	Joanne Courtney	T8th (4-4)	-
2023	Scotties Tournament of Hearts	Rachel Homan	Tracy Fleury (skip)	Emma Miskew	Sarah Wilkes	5th (6–3)	
2023	Mixed Doubles	Lynn Kreviazuk		David Mathers		8th (6–3)	
2024	Mixed Doubles	Lynn Kreviazuk		David Mathers		T18th (3–4)	
