= Orest Meleschuk =

Canadian curler (1940–2026)

- Curler
- Born: April 11, 1940; Saint Boniface, Manitoba, Canada
- Died: June 23, 2026 (aged 86); Selkirk, Manitoba, Canada
Medal record
Representing Canada
World Curling Championships
Gold medal – first place	1972 Garmisch-Partenkirchen
Representing Manitoba
Macdonald Brier
Gold medal – first place	1972 St. John's

Orest Bohdan Meleschuk (April 11, 1940 – June 23, 2026), nicknamed The Big O, was a Canadian curler of Ukrainian descent. He was one of Manitoba's best curlers during the 1960s and 1970s and had won a number of championships and major bonspiels. His greatest curling triumph came in 1972 when he won the Manitoba, Canadian, and World Championships of curling.

== Biography ==
Orest Bohdan Meleschuk was born in St. Boniface, Manitoba on April 11, 1940, the son of Max and Ksenia Meleschuk. He attended Norwood Collegiate and Technical Vocational High School.

He was involved in the first Battle of the Sexes curling match, in which he lost to Vera Pezer's team.

Meleschuk lived in Selkirk, Manitoba until his death. At the time of the 1972 Brier, he was employed as a civil technician. He married Patrica Frances McSherry, and they had two children. He was later married to Carol Laye.

Meleschuk died on June 23, 2026, at the age of 86.

== See also ==
- Curse of LaBonte
