= Calgary Curling Club =

Canadian curling club

- Location: 720 3 Street NW; Calgary, Alberta, T2N 1N9

Information
- Established: 1888
- Club type: Dedicated ice
- Curling Canada region: So. Alberta
- Sheets of ice: 8
- Website: https://www.calgarycurlingclub.com/

The Calgary Curling Club is a curling club located in Calgary, Alberta.

== History ==
The Calgary Curling Club was founded in 1888 and opened its first rink in 1892. It then moved venues to Victoria Park in 1909, and moved from there to its current location in 1953. The club won the women's 2018 Travelers Curling Club Championship.

== Notable members ==
- Cheryl Bernard
- Cori Morris
- Crystal Webster

== Curlers Corner ==
The Curlers Corner equipment shop is located inside of the Calgary Curling Club. The club hosts the Curlers Corner Autumn Gold Curling Classic, a former women's Grand Slam event on the World Curling Tour sponsored by the Curlers Corner equipment shop, every year.

== Provincial champions ==
The club has won a number of provincial curling titles over the years:

=== Women's ===
The club has won the women's provincial championships once:

- 1981 Susan Seitz, Judy Erickson, Myrna McKay, Betty McCracken (1981 Canadian Ladies Curling Association Championship winners, 1981 Royal Bank of Scotland World Women's Curling Championship silver medallists; team also credited as from the North Hill Curling Club).

=== Junior Women's ===
- 1971: Shelby McKenzie, Marlene Pargeter, Arlene Hrdlicka, Debbie Goliss (Canadian Junior Curling Championships winners)
- 1976: Jill Silverthrone, Janice Marchand, Rita Leonard, Kathy Campbell
- 1979: Sandra Knights, Wanda McMurdo, Tracy Sloan, Dianne Kadonga
- 1998: Bronwen Saunders, Jennifer Vejprava, Tara Runquist, Erika Hildebrand
- 1999: Kyla MacLachlan, Chantel Paradis, Sara Gartner, Lyndsey Wegmann
- 2002: Jennifer Vejprava, Erika Hildebrand, Kristen Moore, Susan Loftus
- 2008: Maria Bushell, Jenn Liner, Jody Keim, Heather Rogers
- 2010: Nadine Chyz, Rebecca Pattison, Kristina Hadden, Kimberly Anderson

=== Senior women ===
- 1979: Alice Crawford, Peggy Bogart, Jean Cherry, Margaret Clarke
- 1981: Bea Mayer, Eileen Cyr, Leah Nate, Alice Vejprava (Canadian Senior Curling Championships winners)
- 1982: Jean Hugh, Evelyn Robertson, Shirley Morrison, Isobel Henderson
- 1983: Bea Mayer, Marg Scott, Leah Nate, Phyllis Barry
- 1984: Bea Mayer, Marg Scott, Leah Nate, Alice Vejprava
- 1993: Cordella Schwengler, Marjorie Stewart, Marjorie Kushnir, Nora Eaves
- 1994: Cordella Schwengler, Marjorie Stewart, Marjorie Kushnir, Nora Eaves (Canadian Senior Curling Championships winners)
- 1998: Cordella Schwengler, Marjorie Stewart, Marilyn Bratton, Nora Eaves
- 1999: Sandra Turner, Cordella Schwengler, Marilyn Toews, Arlene Breckenridge
- 2001: Susan Seitz, Heather Loat, Darlene Breckenridge, Sharen McLean
- 2008: Sandy Turner, Linda Wagner, Marilyn Toews, Judy Carr
- 2009: Peggy Harper, Judy Pendergast, Deb Pendergast, Cheryl Meek
- 2023: Atina Ford-Johnston, Shannon Morris, Sheri Pickering, Cori Morris
- 2024: Atina Ford-Johnston, Shannon Morris, Sheri Pickering, Cori Morris (Canadian Senior Curling Championships winners)

=== Master Women's ===
- 1995: Peggy Bogart, Jean Smith, Flo Markin Alice Lavery
- 2000: Phyl Raymond, Toni Ironside, Vida Roseboom, Jackie Ogryzio
- 2003: Cordella Schwengler, Toni Ironside, Amy Sawby, Jackie Ogryzlo
- 2004: Sandy Turner, Marilyn Toews, Ioline Meier, Betty Clarke
- 2005: Mary Lynn Oates, Sandy Turner, Marilyn Toews, Betty Clarke
- 2007: Linda Wagner, Sandy Turner, Marilyn Toews, Betty Clarke (Canadian Masters Curling Championships winners)
- 2008: Mary Lynn Oates, Heather Paul-Scott, Sylvia Babich, Linda Pratt (Canadian Masters Curling Championships winners; shared with Inglewood Curling Club)
- 2009: Sandy Turner, Linda Wagner, Mairlyn Toews, Judy Carr
- 2010: Sandy Turner, Judy Carr, Marilyn Toews, Betty Clarke
- 2013: Linda Wagner, Sandy Turner, Judy Carr, Marilyn Toews
- 2015: Linda Wagner, Sandy Turner, Judy Carr, Marilyn Toews
- 2016: Susan Seitz, Jill Hodgins Ukrainec, Barb McDonald, Jane Bleaney
- 2017: Diane Foster, Shelly Bildfell, Jill Hodgins Ukrainec, Donna McLeod

=== Men's ===
The club has won the men's provincial championships 14 times:

- 1935: Robert Alexander, Howard Palmer, Cyril Glover, Walter McLaws
- 1939: Howard Baker, Jacob Curliss, Ernest Irving, St. Clair Webb
- 1941: Howard Palmer, Jack Lebeau, Arthur Gooder, Clare Webb (Macdonald Brier champions)
- 1947: Howard Palmer, Robert Munro, I. O. Chubb, William Watson
- 1960: Stu Beagle, Jimmy Shields, Ron Baker, Fred Storey
- 1963: Jimmy Shields, Ron Northcott, Ron Baker, Fred Storey
- 1964: Ron Northcott, Mike Chernoff, Ron Baker, Fred Storey
- 1965: Nick Laschuk, Slim Otterson, Ken Hamilton, Don Jarrett
- 1966: Ron Northcott, George Fink, Bernie Sparkes, Fred Storey (1966 Macdonald Brier and 1966 Scotch Cup gold medallists)
- 1967: Ron Northcott, George Fink, Bernie Sparkes, Fred Storey
- 1968: Ron Northcott, Jimmy Shields, Bernie Sparkes, Fred Storey (1968 Macdonald Brier and 1968 Air Canada Silver Broom gold medallists)
- 1969: Ron Northcott, Dave Gerlach, Bernie Sparkes, Fred Storey (1969 Macdonald Brier and 1969 Air Canada Silver Broom gold medallists)
- 1976: Wayne Sokolosky, Frank Morissette, John Cottam, Shane Wylie
- 1984: Ed Lukowich, John Ferguson, Neil Houston, Brent Syme

=== U18 men's ===
- 2004: Charley Thomas, Brock Virtue, Matthew Ng, Camerson Rustad

=== Junior men's ===
- 1957: Alf Scheiman, Bill Reeves, Tom Hilton, Ivor Warnick
- 1968: Ron Kelly, Burnie Cox, George Mader, Jim Sopher

=== Senior men's ===
- 1970: R. M. Otterson, Bob Manahan, Shirley Salt, Bill Leew
- 1972: Slim Otterson, Dunc Grant, Shirley Salt, Fred Blight
- 1982: Ray Tull, Bud Purkiss, Ian Sherrington, Tom Hugh
- 1985: Bill Clark, Lee Green, Bob Marshall, John Mayer
- 1988: Bill Clark, Cy Little, Murray MacDonald, John Mayer (Canadian Senior Curling Championships winners)
- 1989: Bill Clark, Cy Little, Murray MacDonald, John Mayer
- 1991: Bill Clark, Cy Little, Herb Pearson, Jim Pringle

=== Masters men's ===
- 1994: Bill Clark, Murray MacDonald, Bud Purkiss, Dan Schmaltz
- 1996: Bill Clark, Cy Little, Murray MacDonald, Bud Purkiss
- 1997: Bill Clark, Cy Little, Murray MacDonald, Bud Purkiss
- 1998: Bill Clark, Cy Little, Murray MacDonald, Bud Purkiss
- 2001: Bill Clark, Herb Pearson, Will Sanders, Dan Schmaltz
- 2003: Maurice Patridge, Jim Strain, Paul Nickell, Jim Lees
- 2006: Art Assman, Lloyd Heller, Guenther Theophile, John Kennedy

=== Mixed ===
- 1965: Lee Green, Kay Berreth, Shirley Salt, Vi Salt (Canadian Mixed Curling Championship winners)
- 1996: Lee Green, Kay Berreth, Shirley Salt, Donna Clark
- 2008: Dean Ross, Susan O'Connor, Tim Krassman, Susan Wright (2008 Canadian Mixed Curling Championship winners)

=== Wheelchair ===
- 2012: Bruno Yizek, Jack Smart, Anne Hibberd, Martin Purvis
- 2013: Bruno Yizek, Jack Smart, Martin Purvis, Anne Hibberd
- 2014: Jack Smart, Bruno Yizek, Martin Purvis, Anne Hibberd
- 2016: Jack Smart, Bruno Yizek, Martin Purvis, Anne Hibberd
