= Garnet Campbell (curler) =

Canadian curler

- Curler
- Born: January 11, 1927; Avonlea, Saskatchewan
- Died: December 30, 2011 (aged 84); Okotoks, Alberta

Team
- Curling club: Avonlea Curling Club

Curling career
- Brier: 10 (1947, 1954, 1955, 1957, 1961, 1966, 1968, 1969, 1970, 1971)
Medal record
Representing Saskatchewan
Macdonald Brier
Gold medal – first place	1955 Regina
Silver medal – second place	1954 Edmonton
Silver medal – second place	1957 Kingston
Silver medal – second place	1961 Calgary
Silver medal – second place	1968 Kelowna
Bronze medal – third place	1947 Saint John
Bronze medal – third place	1966 Halifax
Bronze medal – third place	1969 Oshawa
Bronze medal – third place	1971 Quebec City

William Garnet "The Little General" Campbell (January 11, 1927 – December 30, 2011) was a Canadian curler born in Avonlea, Saskatchewan. He was the first skip from Saskatchewan to win the Brier.

Campbell represented Saskatchewan at ten Briers, winning the championship as skip in 1955 with brothers Don (third), Glen (second) and Lloyd (lead). The team went undefeated (10-0). He won the provincial championships in 1947, 1954, 1955 and 1957 as skip, and then in 1966, 1968, 1969, 1970 and 1971 for skip Bob Pickering. He was also a runner-up in 6 provincial tankards.

In his final Brier in 1971, Campbell became the first player (and only player in the Macdonald era) to have participated in 10 Briers and played in 100 Brier games. Campbell holds the record during the Macdonald era (1927–79) for most Briers played (10), most games played (101), and most wins (76). These were also overall Brier records until Bernie Sparkes surpassed those records in 1983 (most games played) and 1984 (most Briers played and wins) respectively.

In 1976 and 1977, he won the Saskatchewan Mixed Curling Championship along with wife DeVerne, Stan Petruic and Fran Petruic (née Hubbard). He won a provincial senior's championship in 1993, and finished 6–5 at the 1993 Canadian Senior Curling Championships. He also won six provincial masters championships (1989, 1990, 1991, 1992, 1993 and 1995).

He was inducted into the Canadian Curling Hall of Fame in 1974. He was entered into the Saskatchewan Sports Hall of Fame in 1967. He died in Okotoks, Alberta in 2011.

Campbell was the son of Sandy Campbell, a member of his team at the 1947 Macdonald Brier. Campbell worked as a wheat farmer in Avonlea.
