= 1968 Macdonald Brier =

- Host city: Kelowna, British Columbia
- Arena: Kelowna Arena
- Dates: March 4–8
- Attendance: 25,813
- Winner: Alberta
- Curling club: Calgary CC, Calgary
- Skip: Ron Northcott
- Third: Jim Shields
- Second: Bernie Sparkes
- Lead: Fred Storey

The 1968 Macdonald Brier, Canada's national men's curling championship, was held March 4–8 at the Kelowna Arena in Kelowna, British Columbia. A total of 25,813 fans attended the event.

At the time, Kelowna was the smallest city to have hosted the Brier. The city had been trying since 1961 to host the event, and was finally selected after a successful pitch to Brier trustees at the 1967 Brier.

Team Alberta, skipped by Ron Northcott, captured the Brier Tankard by finishing round robin play with a 9–1 record. This was Alberta's tenth Brier championship overall and the second one won by Northcott's rink, who also won the Brier two years prior in 1966. Northcott's rink would represent Canada in the 1968 Air Canada Silver Broom, which was the men's world curling championship.

Alberta won the championship by winning their game against Northern Ontario in the last draw. A loss would have forced a tiebreak match against Saskatchewan, who were runners-up, with an 8–2 record. Prince Edward Island finished in third with a 7–3 record, which at the time was PEI's best Brier finish.

Ice conditions at the event were considered poor, with the ice on Thursday being so bad that "sweeping power was nullified".

Manitoba's 22–5 victory over British Columbia in Draw 4 was the last time a team scored 20 or more points in a Brier game until 2025, which was also held in Kelowna.

== Teams ==
The teams are listed as follows:

Alberta	British Columbia	Manitoba	New Brunswick
Calgary CC, Calgary Skip: Ron Northcott; Third: Jim Shields; Second: Bernie Sparkes; Lead Fred Storey	Richmond WC, Richmond Skip: Bob McCubbin; Third: Jack Tucker; Second: Ed Trimble; Lead: Keith Issac	Dauphin CC, Dauphin Skip: Burke Parker; Third: Lloyd Yerama; Second: Roy Berry; Lead: Jack Yuill	Fredericton CC, Fredericton Skip: Jim Ayer; Third: Ron Ketch; Second: Jim Anderson; Lead: Frank Ayer
Newfoundland	Northern Ontario	Nova Scotia	Ontario
St. John's CC, St. John's Skip: Bill Piercey; Third: Frank M. Stent; Second: Thomas A. Warren; Lead: William C. Roy	Geraldton CC, Geraldton Skip: Herbert Pile; Third: Len Tremblay; Second: Ross Davis; Lead: D. Wayne Downey	Mayflower CC, Halifax Skip: Don Flemming; Third: Chuck Piper Jr. Second: Gregory Jeans; Lead: David Conrad	St. Thomas CC, St. Thomas Skip: Don Gilbert; Third: Al Zikman; Second: Jimmy Waite; Lead: Dick Donald
Prince Edward Island	Quebec	Saskatchewan
Charlottetown CC, Charlottetown Skip: Alan Smith; Third: Doug Bell; Second: Bob Dillon; Lead: Merrill Wiggington	CFB Bagotville CC, Chicoutimi Skip: Bill Tracy; Third: Earl Carson; Second: Alan R. Sully; Lead: Ed Wood	Avonlea CC, Avonlea Skip: Bob Pickering; Third: Jack Keys; Second: Garnet Campbell; Lead: Gary Ford

== Map of teams ==
Provincial Winners

== Round Robin standings ==
The final standings were as follows:

Key
Brier champion

Province	Skip	W	L	PF	PA
Alberta	Ron Northcott	9	1	119	70
Saskatchewan	Bob Pickering	8	2	98	67
Prince Edward Island	Alan Smith	7	3	96	84
New Brunswick	Jim Ayer	6	4	89	77
Ontario	Don Gilbert	6	4	80	78
British Columbia	Bob McCubbin	5	5	85	88
Manitoba	Burke Parker	4	6	95	92
Nova Scotia	Don Flemming	4	6	74	85
Quebec	Bill Tracy	3	7	79	97
Newfoundland	Bill Piercey	2	8	75	118
Northern Ontario	Herbert Pile	1	9	71	105

== Round-robin results ==
=== Draw 1 ===
Monday, March 4, 4:00pm

Team	1	2	3	4	5	6	7	8	9	10	11	12	Final
Quebec (Tracy)	0	0	2	0	1	0	0	1	1	0	0	0	5
Saskatchewan (Pickering)	2	1	0	2	0	2	0	0	0	1	1	2	11

Team	1	2	3	4	5	6	7	8	9	10	11	12	Final
(Newfoundland and Labrador) Newfoundland (Piercey)	0	0	0	1	0	0	0	2	0	1	0	1	5
Alberta (Northcott)	0	0	2	0	1	2	2	0	3	0	3	0	13

Team	1	2	3	4	5	6	7	8	9	10	11	12	Final
Northern Ontario (Pile)	0	4	0	0	2	0	2	0	1	0	0	1	10
British Columbia (McCubbin)	2	0	2	1	0	1	0	4	0	0	1	0	11

Team	1	2	3	4	5	6	7	8	9	10	11	12	Final
Ontario (Gilbert)	1	0	1	1	1	0	0	1	0	1	0	1	7
Manitoba (Parker)	0	1	0	0	0	1	1	0	2	0	0	0	5

Team	1	2	3	4	5	6	7	8	9	10	11	12	13	Final
Prince Edward Island (Smith)	0	1	0	0	2	0	0	1	0	0	0	2	1	7
Nova Scotia (Flemming)	1	0	2	0	0	0	1	0	0	1	1	0	0	6

=== Draw 2 ===
Monday, March 4, 11:00pm

Team	1	2	3	4	5	6	7	8	9	10	11	12	Final
Alberta (Northcott)	3	0	0	1	0	3	1	2	1	0	3	0	14
Nova Scotia (Flemming)	0	1	1	0	1	0	0	0	0	1	0	1	5

Team	1	2	3	4	5	6	7	8	9	10	11	12	Final
New Brunswick (Ayer)	0	0	1	0	1	0	0	1	1	0	0	2	6
Saskatchewan (Pickering)	1	3	0	1	0	3	5	0	0	3	2	0	18

Team	1	2	3	4	5	6	7	8	9	10	11	12	Final
(Newfoundland and Labrador) Newfoundland (Piercey)	0	2	2	0	0	1	0	0	1	1	1	0	8
British Columbia (McCubbin)	2	0	0	1	1	0	3	1	0	0	0	2	10

Team	1	2	3	4	5	6	7	8	9	10	11	12	Final
Prince Edward Island (Smith)	0	0	2	0	2	0	1	0	1	1	1	2	10
Quebec (Tracy)	1	2	0	3	0	1	0	2	0	0	0	0	9

Team	1	2	3	4	5	6	7	8	9	10	11	12	Final
Ontario (Gilbert)	0	1	0	1	1	0	0	2	0	0	1	2	8
Northern Ontario (Pile)	1	0	1	0	0	1	3	0	1	1	0	0	9

=== Draw 3 ===
Tuesday, March 5, 12:00pm

Team	1	2	3	4	5	6	7	8	9	10	11	12	Final
New Brunswick (Ayer)	2	0	0	1	0	1	0	1	0	1	0	1	7
Prince Edward Island (Smith)	0	1	0	0	1	0	2	0	3	0	1	0	8

Team	1	2	3	4	5	6	7	8	9	10	11	12	Final
Nova Scotia (Flemming)	2	0	0	1	1	0	1	2	1	1	0	0	9
British Columbia (McCubbin)	0	3	2	0	0	1	0	0	0	0	2	0	8

Team	1	2	3	4	5	6	7	8	9	10	11	12	Final
(Newfoundland and Labrador) Newfoundland (Piercey)	0	1	1	0	0	5	0	0	0	0	1	0	8
Ontario (Gilbert)	1	0	0	1	1	0	2	3	0	2	0	1	11

Team	1	2	3	4	5	6	7	8	9	10	11	12	Final
Manitoba (Parker)	1	4	0	1	3	0	2	0	1	0	1	1	14
Northern Ontario (Pile)	0	0	3	0	0	1	0	2	0	1	0	0	7

Team	1	2	3	4	5	6	7	8	9	10	11	12	Final
Alberta (Northcott)	0	0	2	0	0	2	0	1	0	3	0	1	9
Quebec (Tracy)	1	0	0	1	0	0	1	0	2	0	3	0	8

=== Draw 4 ===
Tuesday, March 5, 5:30pm

Team	1	2	3	4	5	6	7	8	9	10	11	12	Final
Manitoba (Parker)	2	0	1	0	0	4	3	0	2	1	5	4	22
(Newfoundland and Labrador) Newfoundland (Piercey)	0	3	0	0	1	0	0	1	0	0	0	0	5

Team	1	2	3	4	5	6	7	8	9	10	11	12	Final
British Columbia (McCubbin)	2	0	2	0	0	0	2	0	2	0	2	0	10
Quebec (Tracy)	0	2	0	1	1	1	0	1	0	0	0	0	6

Team	1	2	3	4	5	6	7	8	9	10	11	12	Final
Alberta (Northcott)	0	0	1	0	1	0	2	0	1	1	1	0	7
New Brunswick (Ayer)	1	1	0	1	0	2	0	1	0	0	0	0	6

Team	1	2	3	4	5	6	7	8	9	10	11	12	Final
Saskatchewan (Pickering)	0	0	2	1	1	1	0	3	0	0	3	0	11
Prince Edward Island (Smith)	2	0	0	0	0	0	0	0	1	3	0	2	8

Team	1	2	3	4	5	6	7	8	9	10	11	12	Final
Nova Scotia (Flemming)	0	1	0	0	1	0	0	0	1	0	1	0	4
Ontario (Gilbert)	1	0	2	0	0	0	2	0	0	1	0	1	7

=== Draw 5 ===
Wednesday, March 6, 5:30pm

Team	1	2	3	4	5	6	7	8	9	10	11	12	Final
Saskatchewan (Pickering)	1	0	0	4	0	0	0	1	0	0	0	0	6
Alberta (Northcott)	0	2	2	0	4	1	2	0	4	1	0	1	17

Team	1	2	3	4	5	6	7	8	9	10	11	12	Final
Quebec (Tracy)	2	2	0	1	0	1	0	2	0	0	1	0	9
Ontario (Gilbert)	0	0	2	0	3	0	2	0	1	1	0	2	11

Team	1	2	3	4	5	6	7	8	9	10	11	12	Final
Nova Scotia (Flemming)	1	1	0	2	0	5	0	1	3	1	0	0	14
Manitoba (Parker)	0	0	1	0	0	0	2	0	0	0	1	1	5

Team	1	2	3	4	5	6	7	8	9	10	11	12	Final
Northern Ontario (Pile)	0	0	0	0	0	2	2	1	0	1	0	0	6
(Newfoundland and Labrador) Newfoundland (Piercey)	2	0	1	1	0	0	0	0	1	0	3	1	9

Team	1	2	3	4	5	6	7	8	9	10	11	12	Final
British Columbia (McCubbin)	0	2	0	0	1	0	1	0	0	1	0	1	6
New Brunswick (Ayer)	2	0	0	0	0	2	0	0	1	0	3	0	8

=== Draw 6 ===
Wednesday, March 6, 11:00pm

Team	1	2	3	4	5	6	7	8	9	10	11	12	Final
Prince Edward Island (Smith)	1	0	1	0	0	0	0	2	0	1	1	2	8
Alberta (Northcott)	0	3	0	1	1	2	3	0	4	0	0	0	14

Team	1	2	3	4	5	6	7	8	9	10	11	12	Final
Ontario (Gilbert)	1	0	5	0	0	1	0	1	0	0	0	1	9
New Brunswick (Ayer)	0	1	0	2	0	0	1	0	3	2	1	0	10

Team	1	2	3	4	5	6	7	8	9	10	11	12	Final
British Columbia (McCubbin)	1	0	2	1	2	1	1	1	0	0	0	1	10
Saskatchewan (Pickering)	0	2	0	0	0	0	0	0	1	1	1	0	5

Team	1	2	3	4	5	6	7	8	9	10	11	12	Final
Quebec (Tracy)	0	0	0	1	2	1	1	0	1	0	1	1	8
Manitoba (Parker)	1	2	2	0	0	0	0	1	0	6	0	0	12

Team	1	2	3	4	5	6	7	8	9	10	11	12	13	Final
Northern Ontario (Pile)	2	0	0	1	0	3	0	2	0	1	0	0	0	9
Nova Scotia (Flemming)	0	1	1	0	1	0	1	0	2	0	3	0	1	10

=== Draw 7 ===
Thursday, March 7, 12:00pm

Team	1	2	3	4	5	6	7	8	9	10	11	12	Final
Prince Edward Island (Smith)	1	0	0	0	0	0	1	0	3	0	1	0	6
British Columbia (McCubbin)	0	1	0	0	1	1	0	1	0	1	0	2	7

Team	1	2	3	4	5	6	7	8	9	10	11	12	Final
New Brunswick (Ayer)	0	1	3	0	0	1	0	2	0	0	0	1	8
Manitoba (Parker)	1	0	0	1	0	0	1	0	2	0	1	0	6

Team	1	2	3	4	5	6	7	8	9	10	11	12	Final
Quebec (Tracy)	0	0	3	0	1	2	0	0	1	1	0	0	8
Northern Ontario (Pile)	2	1	0	1	0	0	0	1	0	0	0	2	7

Team	1	2	3	4	5	6	7	8	9	10	11	12	Final
(Newfoundland and Labrador) Newfoundland (Piercey)	0	1	0	1	1	3	1	0	0	1	0	1	9
Nova Scotia (Flemming)	1	0	1	0	0	0	0	1	1	0	1	0	5

Team	1	2	3	4	5	6	7	8	9	10	11	12	Final
Ontario (Gilbert)	0	0	0	0	1	0	0	1	0	1	0	0	3
Saskatchewan (Pickering)	1	1	0	0	0	1	0	0	2	0	1	4	10

=== Draw 8 ===
Thursday, March 7, 5:30pm

Team	1	2	3	4	5	6	7	8	9	10	11	12	Final
(Newfoundland and Labrador) Newfoundland (Piercey)	0	1	0	0	1	0	0	1	0	2	0	3	8
Quebec (Tracy)	1	0	2	1	0	2	3	0	1	0	1	0	11

Team	1	2	3	4	5	6	7	8	9	10	11	12	Final
Manitoba (Parker)	2	0	1	0	1	0	0	0	1	0	0	1	6
Saskatchewan (Pickering)	0	2	0	2	0	4	2	1	0	1	0	0	12

Team	1	2	3	4	5	6	7	8	9	10	11	12	Final
Ontario (Gilbert)	0	0	0	0	0	0	2	0	0	1	0	1	4
Prince Edward Island (Smith)	0	0	0	1	0	1	0	0	1	0	4	0	7

Team	1	2	3	4	5	6	7	8	9	10	11	12	Final
Alberta (Northcott)	1	2	2	1	0	1	4	0	0	1	0	2	14
British Columbia (McCubbin)	0	0	0	0	1	0	0	1	1	0	2	0	5

Team	1	2	3	4	5	6	7	8	9	10	11	12	Final
New Brunswick (Ayer)	0	0	0	0	3	0	2	0	1	2	2	1	11
Northern Ontario (Pile)	1	0	1	2	0	1	0	1	0	0	0	0	6

=== Draw 9 ===
Thursday, March 7, 11:00pm

Team	1	2	3	4	5	6	7	8	9	10	11	12	Final
Alberta (Northcott)	0	0	1	1	0	1	2	0	2	0	1	0	8
Ontario (Gilbert)	0	2	0	0	2	0	0	1	0	3	0	1	9

Team	1	2	3	4	5	6	7	8	9	10	11	12	Final
Nova Scotia (Flemming)	0	0	0	0	2	1	0	0	1	1	0	2	7
Quebec (Tracy)	2	2	1	1	0	0	2	0	0	0	2	0	10

Team	1	2	3	4	5	6	7	8	9	10	11	12	Final
Prince Edward Island (Smith)	1	0	3	0	1	1	0	2	2	0	1	0	11
Manitoba (Parker)	0	1	0	1	0	0	1	0	0	1	0	1	5

Team	1	2	3	4	5	6	7	8	9	10	11	12	Final
Saskatchewan (Pickering)	0	0	2	3	0	0	0	0	0	0	1	1	7
Northern Ontario (Pile)	1	0	0	0	1	0	1	0	0	0	0	0	3

Team	1	2	3	4	5	6	7	8	9	10	11	12	Final
New Brunswick (Ayer)	0	2	0	0	4	1	0	1	0	4	2	0	14
(Newfoundland and Labrador) Newfoundland (Piercey)	0	0	1	0	0	0	1	0	1	0	0	1	4

=== Draw 10 ===
Friday, March 8, 12:00pm

Team	1	2	3	4	5	6	7	8	9	10	11	12	Final
Nova Scotia (Flemming)	0	0	0	0	2	0	0	1	2	2	1	0	8
New Brunswick (Ayer)	0	1	1	1	0	0	1	0	0	0	0	3	7

Team	1	2	3	4	5	6	7	8	9	10	11	12	Final
Northern Ontario (Pile)	0	0	1	0	0	1	1	0	0	2	0	0	5
Prince Edward Island (Smith)	2	1	0	4	0	0	0	0	4	0	2	1	14

Team	1	2	3	4	5	6	7	8	9	10	11	12	Final
Manitoba (Parker)	1	0	0	2	0	0	1	1	0	3	1	0	9
Alberta (Northcott)	0	1	2	0	2	0	0	0	3	0	0	2	10

Team	1	2	3	4	5	6	7	8	9	10	11	12	Final
British Columbia (McCubbin)	1	1	1	0	0	1	0	0	1	0	3	0	8
Ontario (Gilbert)	0	0	0	1	2	0	1	1	0	3	0	3	11

Team	1	2	3	4	5	6	7	8	9	10	11	12	Final
Saskatchewan (Pickering)	2	0	0	0	1	0	0	1	1	0	3	1	9
(Newfoundland and Labrador) Newfoundland (Piercey)	0	1	0	0	0	0	1	0	0	1	0	0	3

=== Draw 11 ===
Friday, March 8, 5:30pm

Team	1	2	3	4	5	6	7	8	9	10	11	12	Final
British Columbia (McCubbin)	2	0	0	1	0	1	1	0	3	0	2	0	10
Manitoba (Parker)	0	2	1	0	1	0	0	2	0	4	0	1	11

Team	1	2	3	4	5	6	7	8	9	10	11	12	13	Final
Prince Edward Island (Smith)	0	4	2	0	5	0	2	0	1	0	2	0	1	17
(Newfoundland and Labrador) Newfoundland (Piercey)	2	0	0	3	0	2	0	3	0	3	0	3	0	16

Team	1	2	3	4	5	6	7	8	9	10	11	12	Final
Saskatchewan (Pickering)	1	0	1	0	1	0	0	3	0	0	2	1	9
Nova Scotia (Flemming)	0	1	0	1	0	1	1	0	1	1	0	0	6

Team	1	2	3	4	5	6	7	8	9	10	11	12	Final
Quebec (Tracy)	2	0	1	0	1	0	0	0	0	1	0	0	5
New Brunswick (Ayer)	0	1	0	1	0	1	3	1	2	0	3	0	12

Team	1	2	3	4	5	6	7	8	9	10	11	12	Final
Northern Ontario (Pile)	1	0	2	0	0	2	1	0	2	0	0	1	9
Alberta (Northcott)	0	2	0	3	1	0	0	2	0	3	2	0	13

== Awards ==
=== All-Star Team ===
The media selected the following curlers as All-Stars:

Bernie Sparkes became the first player to be selected to the all-star team three times as he was selected the two previous years as well.

Position	Name	Team
Skip	Ron Northcott (2)	Alberta
Third	Jack Keys	Saskatchewan
Second	Bernie Sparkes (3)	Alberta
Lead	Fred Storey (2)	Alberta

=== Ross G.L. Harstone Award ===
The Ross Harstone Award was presented to the player chosen by their fellow peers as the curler who best represented Harstone's high ideals of good sportsmanship, observance of the rules, exemplary conduct and curling ability.

Name	Team	Position
Charles Piper Jr.	Nova Scotia	Third

== Records ==
Prince Edward Island's 17-16 extra end victory over Newfoundland in Draw 11 tied the record for the highest scoring game in Brier history. This was also matched in 1932 with Ontario's 17–16 win over New Brunswick and in 1957 with Saskatchewan's 30–3 victory over New Brunswick.
