= Jimmy Shields (curler) =

Canadian male curler

- Curler ♂
- Born: 1929; Sceptre, Saskatchewan
- Died: July 16, 1996 (aged 66–67); Calgary, Alberta

Team
- Curling club: Calgary CC, Calgary, AB

Curling career
- Member Association: Alberta
- Brier: 3: (1960, 1963, 1968)
- World Championship: 1 (1968)
Medal record
Curling
Representing Canada
World Championships
Gold medal – first place	1968 Pointe-Claire
Representing Alberta
Labatt Brier
Gold medal – first place	1968 Kelowna
Silver medal – second place	1963 Brandon
Silver medal – second place	1960 Fort William

James Allen Shields (1929 – July 16, 1996) was a Canadian curler and race horse owner. Shields was a 1968 World Men's champion and a 1968 Brier champion.

Shields grew up in Sceptre, Saskatchewan, where he was a star baseball player, and was inducted into the Saskatchewan Baseball Hall of Fame. While in Saskatchewan, he attended the University of Saskatchewan. He began curling at the age of 12 and moved to Calgary in the 1950s, where he worked for Sun Oil's land department, and would later start up Nordic Oil. Shields was also an owner of race horses and formed Canada West Ranches with fellow curlers Ron Northcott and Barry Naimark, plus friends Al MacDonald and Eric Bishop. In 1979, Shields won the Sovereign Award for Outstanding Owner. He is a member of the Alberta Sports Hall of Fame.

== Personal life and death ==
Shields was married to Joan and had four children, Lorie, Richard, Randy and David. Jimmy Shields died of cancer on July 16, 1996 in Calgary, Alberta.

== Teams ==
Season	Skip	Third	Second	Lead	Events
1955–56	Jimmy Shields	Moe Seaman	David Faibish	Dunc Cran	
1959–60	Stu Beagle	Jim Shields	Ron Baker	Fred Storey	Alta. 1960 (gold); Brier 1960 (silver)
1962–63	Jim Shields	Ron Northcott	Ron Baker	Fred Storey	Alta. 1963 (gold); Brier 1963 (silver)
1965–66	Jimmy Shields	Ray Kingsmith	Fred Storey	Jack Hunter	
1967–68	Ron Northcott	Jimmy Shields	Bernie Sparkes	Fred Storey	Brier 1968 (gold); WCC 1968 (gold)
