= 1955 Macdonald Brier =

Canadian men's curling championship

- Host city: Regina, Saskatchewan
- Arena: Regina Stadium
- Dates: March 7–11
- Attendance: 51,725
- Winner: Saskatchewan
- Curling club: Avonlea CC, Avonlea
- Skip: Garnet Campbell
- Third: Don Campbell
- Second: Glen Campbell
- Lead: Lloyd Campbell

The 1955 Macdonald Brier, the Canadian men's national curling championship, was held from March 7 to 11, 1955 at Regina Stadium in Regina, Saskatchewan. A total of 51,725 fans attended the event, which was a Brier record at the time.

Team Saskatchewan, skipped by Garnet Campbell, won the Brier Tankard by finishing round robin play unbeaten with a 10-0 record. This was Saskatchewan's first ever Brier championship and the ninth time in which a team finished a Brier undefeated.

Following their win, the Scottish pipers played "The Campbells Are Coming" in their honour at the closing ceremonies. Speakers at the closing ceremonies included William John Patterson, the province's lieutenant governor, Ross Harstone, Tankard trustee and David M. Stewart of Macdonald Tobacco. Premier Tommy Douglas presented silver trays to the members of the Campbell team. Douglas announced that they would be honoured by the government in the provincial legislature and presented with gifts.

The Draw 1 game between New Brunswick and Ontario was the first time that a Brier game went to a second extra end. The 14 ends were the most ends played in a game since the first Brier in 1927, when regulation games went 14 ends.

== Teams ==
The teams are listed as follows:

Alberta	British Columbia	Manitoba	New Brunswick
Claresholm CC, Claresholm Skip: Hugh Brown; Third: Oscar Markle; Second: C.L. Dodd; Lead: William Brown	Trail CC, Trail Skip: Reg Stone; Third: Roy Stone; Second: Douglas McGibney; Lead: Hunt McKay	Strathcona CC, Winnipeg Skip: Roy Forsythe; Third: Donald Lord; Second: Frank Muirhead; Lead: Donald Reid	Edmundston CC, Edmundston Skip: Edgar St. Pierre; Third: Walter Brebner; Second: James Coster; Lead: Eugene Abbis
Newfoundland	Northern Ontario	Nova Scotia	Ontario
St. John's CC, St. John's Skip: Norman Rockwell; Third: Leonard Oliver; Second: Norman Pounder; Lead: Carmen Rockwell	Granite CC, North Bay Skip: Rudy Steski; Third: Robert Wyatt; Second: Owen Staples; Lead: Earl McCormick	Truro CC, Truro Skip: Gerald Glinz; Third: Avard Mann; Second: Frank Hoar; Lead: William Peters	Royal Canadian CC, Toronto Skip: Andrew Grant; Third: Walter Derrett; Second: Earl Hushagen; Lead: Ray Grant
Prince Edward Island	Quebec	Saskatchewan
Charlottetown CC, Charlottetown Skip: Wendell MacDonald; Third: John Squarebriggs; Second: Andrew Likely; Lead: Elmer MacDonald	C de C Jacques Cartier, Quebec City Skip: Olivier Samson; Third: William MacDonald; Second: Gabriel Boivin; Lead: Aime Ouellet	Avonlea CC, Avonlea Skip: Garnet Campbell; Third: Don Campbell; Second: Glen Campbell; Lead: Lloyd Campbell

== Round robin standings ==
Key
Brier champion

Province	Skip	W	L	PF	PA
Saskatchewan	Garnet Campbell	10	0	135	61
Manitoba	Roy Forsythe	9	1	105	70
Ontario	Andrew Grant	7	3	117	81
British Columbia	Reg Stone	6	4	99	93
Northern Ontario	Rudy Steski	6	4	109	76
Nova Scotia	Gerald Glinz	5	5	95	111
Alberta	Hugh Brown	4	6	92	93
Prince Edward Island	Wendell MacDonald	4	6	83	98
New Brunswick	Edgar St. Pierre	2	8	86	122
Quebec	Olivier Samson	1	9	74	134
Newfoundland	Norman Rockwell	1	9	71	127

== Round robin results ==
All draw times are listed in Mountain Time (UTC-07:00)

=== Draw 1 ===
Monday, March 7 3:00 PM

Sheet A	1	2	3	4	5	6	7	8	9	10	11	12	Final
Prince Edward Island (MacDonald)	0	0	2	0	0	1	0	2	0	0	0	0	5
Northern Ontario (Steski)	0	1	0	1	1	0	2	0	2	1	2	2	12

Sheet B	1	2	3	4	5	6	7	8	9	10	11	12	Final
Saskatchewan (Campbell)	1	3	1	6	0	4	0	2	1	0	1	1	20
Newfoundland (Rockwell)	0	0	0	0	1	0	1	0	0	1	0	0	3

Sheet C	1	2	3	4	5	6	7	8	9	10	11	12	Final
Quebec (Samson)	0	1	0	1	1	0	1	0	1	0	0	1	6
Manitoba (Forsythe)	1	0	2	0	0	2	0	2	0	1	3	0	11

Sheet D	1	2	3	4	5	6	7	8	9	10	11	12	Final
Alberta (Brown)	1	0	2	0	0	1	0	0	0	1	0	1	6
Nova Scotia (Glinz)	0	2	0	1	0	0	1	0	3	0	3	0	10

Sheet E	1	2	3	4	5	6	7	8	9	10	11	12	13	14	Final
Ontario (Grant)	3	1	1	1	2	1	0	0	0	0	3	0	0	2	14
New Brunswick (St. Pierre)	0	0	0	0	0	0	4	1	1	3	0	3	0	0	12

=== Draw 2 ===
Monday, March 7 8:00 PM

Sheet A	1	2	3	4	5	6	7	8	9	10	11	12	Final
New Brunswick (St. Pierre)	0	4	0	1	3	0	1	0	0	0	0	0	9
Manitoba (Forsythe)	1	0	2	0	0	3	0	5	3	1	1	1	17

Sheet B	1	2	3	4	5	6	7	8	9	10	11	12	Final
Nova Scotia (Glinz)	0	0	0	0	0	0	0	0	2	0	0	1	3
British Columbia (Stone)	1	2	1	1	1	1	2	3	0	4	3	0	19

Sheet C	1	2	3	4	5	6	7	8	9	10	11	12	Final
Northern Ontario (Steski)	2	1	0	2	0	1	0	4	2	2	1	0	15
Quebec (Samson)	0	0	1	0	1	0	3	0	0	0	0	3	8

Sheet D	1	2	3	4	5	6	7	8	9	10	11	12	Final
Prince Edward Island (MacDonald)	0	1	0	1	0	0	0	1	1	1	0	3	8
Saskatchewan (Campbell)	1	0	1	0	1	1	1	0	0	0	6	0	11

Sheet E	1	2	3	4	5	6	7	8	9	10	11	12	Final
Alberta (Brown)	0	3	0	0	0	0	0	0	1	0	0	1	5
Ontario (Grant)	1	0	1	1	2	2	2	1	0	2	1	0	13

=== Draw 3 ===
Tuesday, March 8 9:30 AM

Sheet A	1	2	3	4	5	6	7	8	9	10	11	12	Final
Ontario (Grant)	0	2	2	0	1	2	0	3	0	0	4	1	15
British Columbia (Stone)	1	0	0	1	0	0	1	0	1	1	0	0	5

Sheet B	1	2	3	4	5	6	7	8	9	10	11	12	Final
Northern Ontario (Steski)	2	0	3	0	1	2	0	1	0	1	1	2	13
New Brunswick (St. Pierre)	0	1	0	1	0	0	1	0	1	0	0	0	4

Sheet C	1	2	3	4	5	6	7	8	9	10	11	12	Final
Saskatchewan (Campbell)	1	2	0	2	4	2	0	3	0	0	3	1	18
Quebec (Samson)	0	0	0	0	0	0	1	0	1	1	0	0	3

Sheet D	1	2	3	4	5	6	7	8	9	10	11	12	Final
Prince Edward Island (MacDonald)	1	3	1	3	0	0	0	1	0	0	1	0	10
Newfoundland (Rockwell)	0	0	0	0	1	1	1	0	3	1	0	1	8

Sheet E	1	2	3	4	5	6	7	8	9	10	11	12	Final
Alberta (Brown)	0	2	0	2	0	1	1	0	1	0	0	0	7
Manitoba (Forsythe)	1	0	1	0	1	0	0	4	0	2	1	1	11

=== Draw 4 ===
Tuesday, March 8 2:30 PM

Sheet A	1	2	3	4	5	6	7	8	9	10	11	12	Final
Saskatchewan (Campbell)	1	1	0	1	0	2	0	5	0	3	0	1	14
New Brunswick (St. Pierre)	0	0	1	0	1	0	1	0	1	0	2	0	6

Sheet B	1	2	3	4	5	6	7	8	9	10	11	12	Final
British Columbia (Stone)	0	1	0	3	0	2	0	0	1	0	1	0	8
Manitoba (Forsythe)	1	0	2	0	2	0	1	1	0	3	0	1	11

Sheet C	1	2	3	4	5	6	7	8	9	10	11	12	Final
Ontario (Grant)	1	0	1	1	0	1	2	0	0	0	1	0	7
Nova Scotia (Glinz)	0	1	0	0	1	0	0	3	3	1	0	1	10

Sheet D	1	2	3	4	5	6	7	8	9	10	11	12	Final
Alberta (Brown)	1	0	3	0	1	0	0	1	0	2	0	0	8
Northern Ontario (Steski)	0	2	0	3	0	0	4	0	1	0	4	2	16

Sheet E	1	2	3	4	5	6	7	8	9	10	11	12	13	Final
Quebec (Samson)	0	0	3	2	1	0	1	0	2	0	1	0	1	11
Newfoundland (Rockwell)	1	2	0	0	0	2	0	2	0	1	0	2	0	10

=== Draw 5 ===
Wednesday, March 9 3:00 PM

Sheet A	1	2	3	4	5	6	7	8	9	10	11	12	Final
Manitoba (Forsythe)	0	2	0	3	0	0	0	3	0	0	3	0	11
Nova Scotia (Glinz)	1	0	1	0	2	1	1	0	1	1	0	1	9

Sheet B	1	2	3	4	5	6	7	8	9	10	11	12	Final
British Columbia (Stone)	0	0	0	1	0	3	0	0	3	0	2	1	10
Northern Ontario (Steski)	2	3	0	0	1	0	0	2	0	1	0	0	9

Sheet C	1	2	3	4	5	6	7	8	9	10	11	12	Final
Saskatchewan (Campbell)	2	0	0	0	2	0	2	1	1	3	0	0	11
Alberta (Brown)	0	1	1	0	0	1	0	0	0	0	1	1	5

Sheet D	1	2	3	4	5	6	7	8	9	10	11	12	Final
Quebec (Samson)	1	0	0	3	0	1	0	2	1	0	2	0	10
Prince Edward Island (MacDonald)	0	3	0	0	2	0	2	0	0	4	0	1	12

Sheet E	1	2	3	4	5	6	7	8	9	10	11	12	Final
Newfoundland (Rockwell)	0	1	0	4	0	1	1	1	2	0	0	1	11
New Brunswick (St. Pierre)	1	0	1	0	3	0	0	0	0	1	2	0	8

=== Draw 6 ===
Wednesday, March 9 8:00 PM

Sheet A	1	2	3	4	5	6	7	8	9	10	11	12	Final
Newfoundland (Rockwell)	1	0	1	0	0	0	2	0	1	0	2	0	7
Alberta (Brown)	0	4	0	1	1	2	0	2	0	2	0	2	14

Sheet B	1	2	3	4	5	6	7	8	9	10	11	12	Final
New Brunswick (St. Pierre)	0	3	0	2	0	2	0	1	1	3	0	0	12
Prince Edward Island (MacDonald)	0	0	3	0	1	0	2	0	0	0	3	0	9

Sheet C	1	2	3	4	5	6	7	8	9	10	11	12	Final
British Columbia (Stone)	2	1	0	2	0	0	1	0	2	0	0	0	8
Saskatchewan (Campbell)	0	0	2	0	0	2	0	2	0	2	1	1	10

Sheet D	1	2	3	4	5	6	7	8	9	10	11	12	Final
Nova Scotia (Glinz)	0	1	0	0	1	0	1	0	0	0	2	0	5
Northern Ontario (Steski)	1	0	1	3	0	5	0	0	2	2	0	1	15

Sheet E	1	2	3	4	5	6	7	8	9	10	11	12	Final
Manitoba (Forsythe)	0	0	0	2	0	1	0	4	2	0	0	0	9
Ontario (Grant)	0	1	0	0	1	0	1	0	0	2	1	2	8

=== Draw 7 ===
Thursday, March 10 9:30 AM

Sheet A	1	2	3	4	5	6	7	8	9	10	11	12	Final
Newfoundland (Rockwell)	0	1	0	1	0	3	1	0	2	0	2	0	10
British Columbia (Stone)	1	0	3	0	3	0	0	2	0	1	0	2	12

Sheet B	1	2	3	4	5	6	7	8	9	10	11	12	Final
Prince Edward Island (MacDonald)	0	1	0	2	0	0	1	0	0	0	0	1	5
Alberta (Brown)	0	0	5	0	0	0	0	0	1	0	4	0	10

Sheet C	1	2	3	4	5	6	7	8	9	10	11	12	Final
New Brunswick (St. Pierre)	0	0	0	2	1	2	0	1	1	3	0	2	12
Quebec (Samson)	1	2	1	0	0	0	1	0	0	0	2	0	7

Sheet D	1	2	3	4	5	6	7	8	9	10	11	12	Final
Nova Scotia (Glinz)	0	0	0	2	0	2	0	1	0	1	0	2	8
Saskatchewan (Campbell)	1	5	1	0	4	0	2	0	2	0	4	0	19

Sheet E	1	2	3	4	5	6	7	8	9	10	11	12	Final
Northern Ontario (Steski)	0	2	1	0	0	1	0	1	0	0	1	0	6
Ontario (Grant)	1	0	0	1	2	0	1	0	3	2	0	2	12

=== Draw 8 ===
Thursday, March 10 2:30 PM

Sheet A	1	2	3	4	5	6	7	8	9	10	11	12	Final
Alberta (Brown)	3	0	0	3	1	2	1	0	4	0	2	1	17
Quebec (Samson)	0	2	1	0	0	0	0	1	0	1	0	0	5

Sheet B	1	2	3	4	5	6	7	8	9	10	11	12	Final
Prince Edward Island (MacDonald)	2	0	1	0	2	1	0	0	1	0	0	1	8
British Columbia (Stone)	0	1	0	1	0	0	2	1	0	1	1	0	7

Sheet C	1	2	3	4	5	6	7	8	9	10	11	12	Final
Nova Scotia (Glinz)	0	1	1	0	0	1	2	0	0	3	0	2	10
Newfoundland (Rockwell)	2	0	0	1	1	0	0	1	1	0	1	0	7

Sheet D	1	2	3	4	5	6	7	8	9	10	11	12	Final
Northern Ontario (Steski)	0	1	0	1	0	1	1	0	0	1	0	0	5
Manitoba (Forsythe)	1	0	2	0	1	0	0	1	1	0	1	1	8

Sheet E	1	2	3	4	5	6	7	8	9	10	11	12	Final
Ontario (Grant)	0	0	1	1	0	1	0	1	0	1	1	1	7
Saskatchewan (Campbell)	3	2	0	0	4	0	5	0	1	0	0	0	15

=== Draw 9 ===
Thursday, March 10 7:30 PM

Sheet A	1	2	3	4	5	6	7	8	9	10	11	12	Final
Alberta (Brown)	2	1	2	0	4	0	1	0	1	0	1	0	12
New Brunswick (St. Pierre)	0	0	0	1	0	2	0	1	0	1	0	1	6

Sheet B	1	2	3	4	5	6	7	8	9	10	11	12	Final
Ontario (Grant)	0	3	0	1	3	3	0	3	0	0	4	3	20
Newfoundland (Rockwell)	1	0	1	0	0	0	1	0	1	1	0	0	5

Sheet C	1	2	3	4	5	6	7	8	9	10	11	12	13	Final
Quebec (Samson)	1	0	0	1	1	0	0	3	0	2	0	1	0	9
British Columbia (Stone)	0	2	2	0	0	0	1	0	2	0	2	0	1	10

Sheet D	1	2	3	4	5	6	7	8	9	10	11	12	Final
Prince Edward Island (MacDonald)	0	0	0	2	0	3	1	1	0	0	2	2	11
Nova Scotia (Glinz)	3	2	1	0	0	0	0	0	1	2	0	0	9

Sheet E	1	2	3	4	5	6	7	8	9	10	11	12	Final
Saskatchewan (Campbell)	0	1	1	0	0	2	0	2	0	1	0	1	8
Manitoba (Forsythe)	1	0	0	0	1	0	1	0	1	0	2	0	6

=== Draw 10 ===
Friday, March 11 9:30 AM

Sheet A	1	2	3	4	5	6	7	8	9	10	11	12	Final
British Columbia (Stone)	0	0	4	1	0	2	0	2	1	0	1	0	11
New Brunswick (St. Pierre)	1	1	0	0	3	0	2	0	0	2	0	1	10

Sheet B	1	2	3	4	5	6	7	8	9	10	11	12	Final
Quebec (Samson)	0	1	0	1	0	2	0	3	0	1	0	1	9
Nova Scotia (Glinz)	3	0	2	0	3	0	2	0	1	0	6	0	17

Sheet C	1	2	3	4	5	6	7	8	9	10	11	12	Final
Manitoba (Forsythe)	1	1	2	1	1	0	1	0	0	0	3	1	11
Newfoundland (Rockwell)	0	0	0	0	0	1	0	0	1	1	0	0	3

Sheet D	1	2	3	4	5	6	7	8	9	10	11	12	13	Final
Ontario (Grant)	0	2	1	2	0	0	2	0	1	0	0	0	1	9
Prince Edward Island (MacDonald)	2	0	0	0	3	0	0	1	0	2	0	0	0	8

Sheet E	1	2	3	4	5	6	7	8	9	10	11	12	Final
Saskatchewan (Campbell)	3	0	1	0	2	0	1	0	1	0	1	0	9
Northern Ontario (Steski)	0	2	0	1	0	1	0	1	0	1	0	1	7

=== Draw 11 ===
Friday, March 11 2:30 PM

Sheet A	1	2	3	4	5	6	7	8	9	10	11	12	Final
Quebec (Samson)	0	1	0	0	0	1	0	1	0	2	1	0	6
Ontario (Grant)	1	0	0	2	1	0	2	0	2	0	0	4	12

Sheet B	1	2	3	4	5	6	7	8	9	10	11	12	Final
Manitoba (Forsythe)	0	1	1	0	2	2	0	1	2	0	1	0	10
Prince Edward Island (MacDonald)	1	0	0	1	0	0	2	0	0	1	0	2	7

Sheet C	1	2	3	4	5	6	7	8	9	10	11	12	Final
British Columbia (Stone)	0	3	1	2	0	1	0	1	0	1	0	0	9
Alberta (Brown)	1	0	0	0	1	0	1	0	3	0	1	1	8

Sheet D	1	2	3	4	5	6	7	8	9	10	11	12	Final
New Brunswick (St. Pierre)	0	0	3	0	1	0	2	0	0	0	1	0	7
Nova Scotia (Glinz)	4	1	0	3	0	1	0	2	1	1	0	1	14

Sheet E	1	2	3	4	5	6	7	8	9	10	11	12	Final
Newfoundland (Rockwell)	2	0	0	1	0	3	0	0	0	0	1	0	7
Northern Ontario (Steski)	0	1	2	0	3	0	2	1	0	1	0	1	11
