= 1969 Macdonald Brier =

Canadian men's curling championship

- Host city: Oshawa, Ontario
- Arena: Oshawa Civic Auditorium
- Dates: March 3–7
- Attendance: 28,446
- Winner: Alberta
- Curling club: Calgary CC, Calgary
- Skip: Ron Northcott
- Third: Dave Gerlach
- Second: Bernie Sparkes
- Lead: Fred Storey

The 1969 Macdonald Brier, Canada's national men's curling championship, was held March 3–7 at the Oshawa Civic Auditorium in Oshawa, Ontario.

The Ron Northcott rink representing Alberta won their third title, having gone undefeated. It was the first time a team had gone undefeated since 1957. It was also the 11th title for Alberta. Northcott became the fourth skip to ever win back-to-back Briers, joining Gordon Hudson, Matt Baldwin, and Ernie Richardson (twice).

British Columbia were runners-up, with an impressive 9-1 record, which was usually good enough to win. Both Saskatchewan and Prince Edward Island tied for third place at 7-3 records. It was tied for the best ever result for PEI, which also finished third the previous year.

== Teams ==
The teams are listed as follows:

Alberta	British Columbia	Manitoba
Calgary CC, Calgary Skip: Ron Northcott; Third: Dave Gerlach; Second: Bernie Sparkes; Lead: Fred Storey	Prince George CC, Prince George Skip: Kevin Smale; Third: Peter Sherba; Second: Bob McDonald; Lead: Pat Carr	Maple Leaf CC, Winnipeg Skip: Bob Robinson; Third: Al Shinfield; Second: Len Easton; Lead: Doug Strange
New Brunswick	Newfoundland	Northern Ontario
Moncton CA, Moncton Skip: Harold Mabey Jr. Third: Ed Steeves; Second: Harold Keith; Lead: Grant MacMellon	St. John's CC, St. John's Skip: Bill Piercey; Third: Frank M. Stent; Second: Thomas A. Warren; Lead: William C. Roy	Kenora CC, Kenora Skip: Terry Johnson; Third: Jack Thompson; Second: Grant Green; Lead: Gordon Peterson
Nova Scotia	Ontario	Prince Edward Island
Dartmouth CC, Dartmouth Skip: Peter Hope; Third: Gene Mattatall; Second: Bob Margeson; Lead: Reg Beaver	London CC, London Skip: Ken Buchan; Third: Gary Weisz; Second: Mitch Czaja; Lead: Ross Guest	Charlottetown CC, Charlottetown Skip: Alan Smith; Third: Doug Bell; Second: Bob Dillon; Lead: Merrill Wiggington
Quebec	Saskatchewan
CFB Bagotville CC, Chicoutimi Skip: Earl Carson; Third: Doug Stuart; Second: Alan R. Sully; Lead: Ed Wood	Avonlea CC, Avonlea Skip: Bob Pickering; Third: Garnet Campbell; Second: Bob Thomas; Lead: Gary Ford

== Map of teams ==
Provincial Winners

== Round robin standings ==
Final Round Robin standings:

Key
Brier champion

Province	Skip	W	L	PF	PA
Alberta	Ron Northcott	10	0	117	74
British Columbia	Kevin Smale	9	1	99	73
Prince Edward Island	Alan Smith	7	3	88	75
Saskatchewan	Bob Pickering	7	3	100	75
Quebec	Earl Carson	5	5	87	90
Northern Ontario	Terry Johnson	5	5	86	88
Manitoba	Rob Robinson	3	7	80	102
New Brunswick	Harold Mabey Jr.	3	7	77	94
Newfoundland	Bill Piercey	2	8	81	117
Nova Scotia	Peter Hope	2	8	81	107
Ontario	Ken Buchan	2	8	92	93

== Round robin results ==
=== Draw 1 ===
Monday, March 3

Team	1	2	3	4	5	6	7	8	9	10	11	12	Final
Saskatchewan (Pickering)	2	1	1	2	2	0	1	1	1	0	0	1	12
Newfoundland (Piercey)	0	0	0	0	0	1	0	0	0	2	2	0	5

Team	1	2	3	4	5	6	7	8	9	10	11	12	Final
Manitoba (Robinson)	0	1	0	0	0	0	1	0	0	1	0	0	3
Alberta (Northcott)	3	0	0	3	0	3	0	0	0	0	1	1	11

Team	1	2	3	4	5	6	7	8	9	10	11	12	Final
New Brunswick (Mabey)	1	0	1	0	0	0	1	0	3	0	0	2	8
Prince Edward Island (Smith)	0	2	0	1	1	1	0	4	0	0	2	0	11

Team	1	2	3	4	5	6	7	8	9	10	11	12	Final
Quebec (Carson)	1	0	0	2	0	1	0	1	2	0	0	3	10
Northern Ontario (Johnson)	0	3	2	0	0	0	1	0	0	2	1	0	9

Team	1	2	3	4	5	6	7	8	9	10	11	12	Final
British Columbia (Smale)	0	1	0	0	2	0	0	1	0	1	1	0	6
Ontario (Buchan)	1	0	0	1	0	0	1	0	0	0	0	1	4

=== Draw 2 ===
Monday, March 3

Team	1	2	3	4	5	6	7	8	9	10	11	12	Final
British Columbia (Smale)	0	3	0	2	3	2	0	0	2	0	3	1	16
Saskatchewan (Pickering)	0	0	1	0	0	0	0	5	0	4	0	0	10

Team	1	2	3	4	5	6	7	8	9	10	11	12	Final
Alberta (Northcott)	2	0	3	0	1	0	2	0	1	1	0	0	10
Northern Ontario (Johnson)	0	2	0	1	0	2	0	2	0	0	1	1	9

Team	1	2	3	4	5	6	7	8	9	10	11	12	Final
Quebec (Carson)	0	1	0	0	2	0	1	2	0	1	0	1	8
New Brunswick (Mabey)	2	0	1	1	0	1	0	0	1	0	1	0	7

Team	1	2	3	4	5	6	7	8	9	10	11	12	Final
Manitoba (Robinson)	2	0	1	0	0	0	0	4	0	1	0	0	8
Newfoundland (Piercey)	0	1	0	1	1	1	2	0	2	0	2	1	11

Team	1	2	3	4	5	6	7	8	9	10	11	12	13	Final
Nova Scotia (Hope)	1	0	0	1	0	0	2	1	0	1	0	1	0	7
Prince Edward Island (Smith)	0	0	2	0	1	1	0	0	2	0	1	0	1	8

=== Draw 3 ===
Tuesday, March 4

Team	1	2	3	4	5	6	7	8	9	10	11	12	Final
Manitoba (Robinson)	1	0	0	0	2	0	1	0	0	3	0	1	8
British Columbia (Smale)	0	0	4	0	0	1	0	3	4	0	2	0	14

Team	1	2	3	4	5	6	7	8	9	10	11	12	Final
Alberta (Northcott)	0	0	2	2	0	3	0	2	0	2	0	3	14
New Brunswick (Mabey)	2	2	0	0	1	0	1	0	1	0	1	0	8

Team	1	2	3	4	5	6	7	8	9	10	11	12	Final
Ontario (Buchan)	0	2	2	0	0	1	0	1	0	2	0	1	9
Saskatchewan (Pickering)	1	0	0	3	1	0	1	0	1	0	3	0	10

Team	1	2	3	4	5	6	7	8	9	10	11	12	13	Final
Northern Ontario (Johnson)	0	0	2	1	0	0	3	0	1	0	1	0	1	9
Newfoundland (Piercey)	1	2	0	0	1	1	0	1	0	1	0	1	0	8

Team	1	2	3	4	5	6	7	8	9	10	11	12	Final
Nova Scotia (Hope)	0	4	0	0	1	0	1	0	0	3	2	0	11
Quebec (Carson)	1	0	0	1	0	2	0	1	1	0	0	1	7

=== Draw 4 ===
Tuesday, March 4

Team	1	2	3	4	5	6	7	8	9	10	11	12	Final
Prince Edward Island (Smith)	0	1	1	0	0	0	1	0	1	0	1	0	5
Quebec (Carson)	1	0	0	1	2	1	0	1	0	1	0	1	8

Team	1	2	3	4	5	6	7	8	9	10	11	12	Final
Newfoundland (Piercey)	0	0	0	2	0	0	2	0	2	0	2	0	8
New Brunswick (Mabey)	0	0	1	0	1	1	0	3	0	2	0	1	9

Team	1	2	3	4	5	6	7	8	9	10	11	12	Final
Northern Ontario (Johnson)	0	1	0	0	0	1	0	1	0	0	1	0	4
British Columbia (Smale)	1	0	1	1	0	0	1	0	2	1	0	3	10

Team	1	2	3	4	5	6	7	8	9	10	11	12	Final
Alberta (Northcott)	2	0	2	1	0	0	4	1	3	0	2	0	15
Nova Scotia (Hope)	0	1	0	0	2	1	0	0	0	2	0	1	7

Team	1	2	3	4	5	6	7	8	9	10	11	12	Final
Ontario (Buchan)	0	1	0	0	3	0	0	1	0	1	0	1	7
Manitoba (Robinson)	1	0	0	2	0	1	2	0	1	0	1	0	8

=== Draw 5 ===
Wednesday, March 5

Team	1	2	3	4	5	6	7	8	9	10	11	12	Final
Saskatchewan (Pickering)	0	2	3	0	0	0	2	0	2	0	0	1	10
Manitoba (Robinson)	2	0	0	1	1	0	0	2	0	0	1	0	7

Team	1	2	3	4	5	6	7	8	9	10	11	12	Final
New Brunswick (Mabey)	0	1	1	0	0	0	1	0	1	0	1	1	6
British Columbia (Smale)	0	0	0	2	1	2	0	1	0	1	0	0	7

Team	1	2	3	4	5	6	7	8	9	10	11	12	Final
Prince Edward Island (Smith)	0	0	0	0	2	2	0	2	0	1	0	0	7
Alberta (Northcott)	0	1	3	1	0	0	1	0	1	0	0	1	8

Team	1	2	3	4	5	6	7	8	9	10	11	12	Final
Northern Ontario (Johnson)	3	1	0	2	2	0	0	0	0	3	0	0	11
Ontario (Buchan)	0	0	1	0	0	2	0	2	2	0	1	2	10

Team	1	2	3	4	5	6	7	8	9	10	11	12	Final
Newfoundland (Piercey)	1	0	2	0	3	2	0	1	0	2	1	X	12
Nova Scotia (Hope)	0	2	0	4	0	0	0	0	3	0	0	X	9

=== Draw 6 ===
Wednesday, March 5

Team	1	2	3	4	5	6	7	8	9	10	11	12	Final
Saskatchewan (Pickering)	2	1	0	0	1	0	2	3	0	0	2	0	11
Northern Ontario (Johnson)	0	0	1	0	0	1	0	0	2	0	0	1	5

Team	1	2	3	4	5	6	7	8	9	10	11	12	Final
(Newfoundland and Labrador) Newfoundland (Piercey)	0	1	0	0	1	0	1	0	1	0	1	1	6
Prince Edward Island (Smith)	2	0	2	2	0	1	0	6	0	0	0	0	13

Team	1	2	3	4	5	6	7	8	9	10	11	12	Final
British Columbia (Smale)	0	3	0	0	2	0	1	1	0	2	0	0	9
Nova Scotia (Hope)	1	0	1	1	0	1	0	0	1	0	1	2	8

Team	1	2	3	4	5	6	7	8	9	10	11	12	Final
Quebec (Carson)	1	0	1	0	0	1	0	1	0	2	0	0	6
Alberta (Northcott)	0	4	0	3	0	0	2	0	3	0	2	0	14

Team	1	2	3	4	5	6	7	8	9	10	11	12	Final
New Brunswick (Mabey)	0	1	0	3	0	0	1	1	3	0	0	2	11
Ontario (Buchan)	1	0	2	0	4	1	0	0	0	1	1	0	10

=== Draw 7 ===
Thursday, March 6

Team	1	2	3	4	5	6	7	8	9	10	11	12	Final
New Brunswick (Mabey)	0	1	0	1	0	0	1	0	0	0	0	0	3
Saskatchewan (Pickering)	0	0	2	0	2	0	0	0	0	0	1	3	8

Team	1	2	3	4	5	6	7	8	9	10	11	12	Final
British Columbia (Smale)	0	1	0	0	1	0	0	0	1	0	1	2	6
Prince Edward Island (Smith)	0	0	0	2	0	1	1	0	0	1	0	0	5

Team	1	2	3	4	5	6	7	8	9	10	11	12	Final
Quebec (Carson)	1	1	0	1	1	1	0	1	0	1	0	5	12
Newfoundland (Piercey)	0	0	1	0	0	0	1	0	2	0	1	0	5

Team	1	2	3	4	5	6	7	8	9	10	11	12	Final
Nova Scotia (Hope)	0	1	0	3	0	1	0	2	0	1	0	2	10
Ontario (Buchan)	0	0	3	0	1	0	1	0	2	0	2	0	9

Team	1	2	3	4	5	6	7	8	9	10	11	12	Final
Manitoba (Robinson)	1	0	1	0	2	0	2	0	0	0	1	1	8
Northern Ontario (Johnson)	0	2	0	2	0	2	0	1	1	1	0	0	9

=== Draw 8 ===
Thursday, March 6

Team	1	2	3	4	5	6	7	8	9	10	11	12	Final
Nova Scotia (Hope)	1	0	0	0	0	0	1	0	2	0	0	2	6
Saskatchewan (Pickering)	0	1	2	1	2	1	0	2	0	1	2	0	12

Team	1	2	3	4	5	6	7	8	9	10	11	12	Final
Manitoba (Robinson)	2	0	0	3	0	1	2	0	2	0	2	0	12
New Brunswick (Mabey)	0	0	1	0	2	0	0	2	0	1	0	2	8

Team	1	2	3	4	5	6	7	8	9	10	11	12	Final
British Columbia (Smale)	3	1	0	2	2	1	0	0	1	0	0	0	10
Quebec (Carson)	0	0	1	0	0	0	1	1	0	3	2	1	9

Team	1	2	3	4	5	6	7	8	9	10	11	12	Final
Ontario (Buchan)	0	1	0	2	0	2	2	0	1	1	0	0	9
Prince Edward Island (Smith)	2	0	1	0	3	0	0	2	0	0	1	2	11

Team	1	2	3	4	5	6	7	8	9	10	11	12	Final
Alberta (Northcott)	0	3	0	2	1	1	0	2	0	1	0	6	16
Newfoundland (Piercey)	1	0	3	0	0	0	2	0	2	0	1	0	9

=== Draw 9 ===
Thursday, March 6

Team	1	2	3	4	5	6	7	8	9	10	11	12	Final
Prince Edward Island (Smith)	0	3	0	0	1	1	0	2	0	0	1	2	10
Saskatchewan (Pickering)	2	0	0	2	0	0	0	0	0	3	0	0	7

Team	1	2	3	4	5	6	7	8	9	10	11	12	Final
Northern Ontario (Johnson)	1	2	0	2	0	1	0	0	1	0	0	1	8
New Brunswick (Mabey)	0	0	1	0	1	0	1	0	0	1	2	0	6

Team	1	2	3	4	5	6	7	8	9	10	11	12	13	Final
Ontario (Buchan)	0	0	2	1	1	0	2	0	1	0	1	0	1	9
Quebec (Carson)	0	2	0	0	0	1	0	2	0	1	0	2	0	8

Team	1	2	3	4	5	6	7	8	9	10	11	12	Final
Nova Scotia (Hope)	0	2	0	0	1	1	0	0	1	2	0	0	7
Manitoba (Robinson)	2	0	1	1	0	0	1	2	0	0	0	1	8

Team	1	2	3	4	5	6	7	8	9	10	11	12	Final
Alberta (Northcott)	1	0	1	0	3	2	0	1	0	1	0	0	9
British Columbia (Smale)	0	1	0	3	0	0	1	0	1	0	2	0	8

=== Draw 10 ===
Friday, March 7

Team	1	2	3	4	5	6	7	8	9	10	11	12	Final
Saskatchewan (Pickering)	2	3	1	0	2	0	0	1	0	2	0	1	12
Quebec (Carson)	0	0	0	1	0	2	0	0	1	0	1	0	5

Team	1	2	3	4	5	6	7	8	9	10	11	12	Final
Prince Edward Island (Smith)	0	1	1	0	3	1	0	0	0	2	0	3	11
Manitoba (Robinson)	1	0	0	2	0	0	2	1	2	0	2	0	10

Team	1	2	3	4	5	6	7	8	9	10	11	12	Final
Ontario (Buchan)	1	1	0	2	0	2	0	1	0	2	0	0	9
Alberta (Northcott)	0	0	2	0	1	0	2	0	1	0	4	1	11

Team	1	2	3	4	5	6	7	8	9	10	11	12	Final
Northern Ontario (Johnson)	1	0	1	0	1	2	2	0	5	2	0	2	16
Nova Scotia (Hope)	0	2	0	2	0	0	0	2	0	0	2	0	8

Team	1	2	3	4	5	6	7	8	9	10	11	12	Final
Newfoundland (Piercey)	2	0	1	0	2	0	0	3	0	1	1	0	10
British Columbia (Smale)	0	2	0	2	0	2	3	0	1	0	3	0	13

=== Draw 11 ===
Friday, March 7

Team	1	2	3	4	5	6	7	8	9	10	11	12	Final
Quebec (Carson)	2	0	2	0	1	0	2	4	0	1	0	2	14
Manitoba (Robinson)	0	1	0	1	0	1	0	0	3	0	2	0	8

Team	1	2	3	4	5	6	7	8	9	10	11	12	13	Final
Prince Edward Island (Smith)	1	0	2	0	1	0	1	0	0	1	0	0	1	7
Northern Ontario (Johnson)	0	1	0	2	0	1	0	1	0	0	0	1	0	6

Team	1	2	3	4	5	6	7	8	9	10	11	12	Final
Saskatchewan (Pickering)	0	0	0	2	0	1	1	0	0	3	1	0	8
Alberta (Northcott)	1	2	1	0	1	0	0	0	3	0	0	1	9

Team	1	2	3	4	5	6	7	8	9	10	11	12	Final
New Brunswick (Mabey)	0	3	0	2	0	2	0	1	2	0	0	1	11
Nova Scotia (Hope)	2	0	1	0	1	0	1	0	0	2	1	0	8

Team	1	2	3	4	5	6	7	8	9	10	11	12	Final
Newfoundland (Piercey)	0	0	0	0	0	0	2	0	4	0	1	0	7
Ontario (Buchan)	3	2	2	1	2	2	0	1	0	1	0	2	16

== Awards ==
=== All-Star Team ===
The media selected the following curlers as All-Stars:

Bernie Sparkes became the first player to be selected to the all-star team four times as he was selected the three previous years as well.

Position	Name	Team
Skip	Ron Northcott (3)	Alberta
Third	Pete Sherba	British Columbia
Second	Bernie Sparkes (4)	Alberta
Lead	Fred Storey (3)	Alberta

=== Ross G.L. Harstone Award ===
The Ross Harstone Award was presented to the player chosen by their fellow peers as the curler who best represented Harstone's high ideals of good sportsmanship, observance of the rules, exemplary conduct and curling ability.

Name	Team	Position
Bill Piercey	Newfoundland	Skip
