= Lloyd Campbell (curler) =

Canadian curler

- Curler
- Born: January 4, 1915 near Avonlea, Saskatchewan
- Died: May 25, 2016 (aged 101); Emerald Park, Saskatchewan

Team
- Curling club: Avonlea Curling Club

Curling career
- Brier: 3 (1947, 1955, 1957)
Medal record
Representing Saskatchewan
Macdonald Brier
| Gold medal – first place | 1955 Regina |
| Silver medal – second place | 1957 Kingston |
| Bronze medal – third place | 1947 Saint John |

Lloyd Harris Campbell (January 4, 1915 – May 25, 2016) was a Canadian curler. He played lead on a team consisting of three of his brothers, winning the 1955 Brier, Canada's national men's curling championship.

Campbell won three provincial men's championships in his career, all playing on a team skipped by his brother, Garnet. His first was in 1947, playing second on the team. They represented Saskatchewan at the 1947 Macdonald Brier, where they finished third with a 6-4 record. They returned to the Brier in 1955 after winning another provincial championship. Campbell at this point was the lead on the team. At the 1955 Brier, the team went undefeated, winning all 10 games to capture their only national championship, and the first Brier championship for Saskatchewan. The team returned to the Brier two years later by winning the 1957 provincial championship. At the 1957 Brier, the four-some finished in second place, behind Alberta's Matt Baldwin, finishing with an 8-2 record.

== Personal life ==
Outside of curling, Campbell was a farmer, owning land in the Pense, Saskatchewan area. He became a pedigreed seed grower in 1952 and was a member of the Canadian Seed Growers Association and was a founding member of the Palliser Wheat Growers Association. He continued to farm into the 1990s. He retired in 2006. He was married to Wilma Campbell (Hubbard) and had four children. Campbell died at the age of 101 on May 25, 2016.
