= 1966 Macdonald Brier =

- Host city: Halifax, Nova Scotia
- Arena: Halifax Forum
- Dates: March 7–11
- Attendance: 11,905
- Winner: Alberta
- Curling club: Calgary CC, Calgary
- Skip: Ron Northcott
- Third: George Fink
- Second: Bernie Sparkes
- Lead: Fred Storey
- Finalist: Ontario (Gurowka)

The 1966 Macdonald Brier the Canadian men's national curling championship, was held March 7 to 11, 1966 at the Halifax Forum in Halifax, Nova Scotia. After the Brier the year before broke attendance records, the 1966 edition only drew 11,905 fans. At the time, only the 1947 Brier drew fewer fans.

Both Alberta and Ontario finished round robin play with identical 8–2 records, necessitating a tiebreaker playoff between the two teams for the Brier championship. Team Alberta, skipped by Ron Northcott, won the Brier Tankard over Ontario 7–6 in the tiebreaker playoff. This was the ninth time that Alberta won the Brier championship and the first of three Briers that Northcott won as a skip.

Northcott and his team would go on to represent Canada at the 1966 Scotch Cup, the World Curling Championship, which they won.

== Event Summary ==
After the Thursday afternoon draw (Draw 8), there were five teams with a legitimate shot at the championship. Alberta was sitting at 6–1 with Ontario sitting at 6–2, Manitoba and Saskatchewan both sitting at 5–2, and Nova Scotia sitting at 5–3.

The Thursday evening draw saw the standings tighten up even more. Manitoba scored two in the final end for a 9–8 victory over Alberta, Saskatchewan rolled past PEI 17–5, and Ontario beat Newfoundland 10-8 while Nova Scotia drew a bye. This caused four teams to now be sitting at two losses heading into the final two draws on Friday.

The penultimate draw on Friday morning saw Alberta beat British Columbia 10–8, Nova Scotia beating Quebec 9–6, and Saskatchewan rolling past New Brunswick 14-5 while Ontario drew a bye. However, Newfoundland (who entered the draw with only one win) pulled off a stunning upset as they blew out Manitoba 17–5. This would cause a three-way tie between Alberta, Ontario, and Saskatchewan with 7-2 records while Manitoba and Nova Scotia both now sitting a game back at 6–3. With matchups featuring Manitoba and Ontario along with Nova Scotia and Saskatchewan in the final draw, there was a high chance that at least one tiebreaker would be needed to determine the Brier champion after round robin play concluded.

The final draw of the round robin on Friday afternoon ended up living up to its hype. Saskatchewan, who was one of the teams tied for first led Nova Scotia 7-5 heading into the twelfth and final end without hammer. Nova Scotia would end up scoring two and forced the game into an extra end. Nova Scotia then would steal one in the extra end to beat Saskatchewan 8–7 as both teams now needed Alberta and Ontario to both lose to still have a shot at the championship via a five-way tiebreaker. However, this would not be up to fruition as Alberta pulled away late against PEI for a 7–3 win eliminating Manitoba, Nova Scotia, and Saskatchewan from contention. Ontario won a back-and-forth game with Manitoba as Ontario broke a 7-all tie with two in the final end for a 9–7 victory and forcing a tiebreaker playoff with Alberta for the Brier championship.

In the playoff, Alberta skip Ron Northcott missed three last-rock takeouts in a row to go down 0–3 after the first three ends. Northcott drew for a single in the fourth, before Ontario scored a single in the fifth. Alberta then scored two in six, then stole a single in the seventh when Ontario skip Joe Gurowka was heavy on a draw attempt. The teams exchanged singles over the next four ends, with the game tied after 11. Northcott had attempted to blank the eleventh to carry over hammer to the 12th and deciding end, but missed, giving the hammer back to Ontario. In the last end, Northcott wicked off an Ontario stone behind cover to lie one with his last shot. Gurowka elected to counter with a draw to the button, but was wide and heavy, giving the championship to Alberta.

== Teams ==
The teams were as follows:

Alberta	British Columbia	Manitoba	New Brunswick
Calgary CC, Calgary Skip: Ron Northcott; Third: George Fink; Second: Bernie Sparkes; Lead: Fred Storey	Burnaby WC, Burnaby Skip: Lynn Mason; Third: Leslie McCabe; Second: Omer Eberg; Lead: Al Thun	Maple Leaf CC, Winnipeg Skip: Hersh Lerner; Third: Bob Lemecha; Second: Allan Dudar; Lead: Bob Dudar	St. Andrews CC, Saint John Skip: Charlie Sullivan Sr. Third: Dave Sullivan; Second: Bob Arseneau; Lead: Malcolm McLaughlin
Newfoundland	Northern Ontario	Nova Scotia	Ontario
St. John's CC, St. John's Skip: George MacCharles; Third: John Taite; Second: Ken Ellis; Lead: Alex Andrews	Cobalt-Haileybury CC, Haileybury Skip: Bill Grozelle; Third: Bob Grozelle; Second: Ted Butt; Lead: George McIllwaine	Halifax CC, Halifax Skip: Vic Snarr; Third: Ken Bell; Second: Don Green; Lead: Bob Cunningham	Dixie CC, Cooksville Skip: Joe Gurowka; Third: Tom Howat; Second: Ken Ingo; Lead: Donald Mackey
Prince Edward Island	Quebec	Saskatchewan
Belvedere G&WC, Charlottetown Skip: Art Burke; Third: Arnold Llewellyn; Second: Ralph Manning; Lead: Temple Hooper	RCAF Bagotville CC, Bagotville Skip: Bill Tracy; Third: Earl Carson; Second: Chuck Perry; Lead: Terry Bloom	Avonlea CC, Avonlea Skip: Bob Pickering; Third: Jack Keys; Second: Garnet Campbell; Lead: Glen Campbell

== Map of teams ==
Provincial Winners

== Round Robin standings ==
Key
Teams to Tiebreaker

Province	Skip	W	L	PF	PA
Alberta	Ron Northcott	8	2	103	70
Ontario	Joe Gurowka	8	2	94	72
Nova Scotia	Vic Snarr	7	3	80	80
Saskatchewan	Bob Pickering	7	3	109	78
Manitoba	Hersh Lerner	6	4	91	88
British Columbia	Lynn Mason	5	5	89	92
Prince Edward Island	Art Burke	4	6	76	92
Quebec	Bill Tracy	4	6	92	91
New Brunswick	Charlie Sullivan Sr.	3	7	79	92
Newfoundland	George MacCharles	2	8	84	93
Northern Ontario	Bill Grozelle	1	9	74	123

== Round Robin results ==
All draw times are listed in Atlantic Time (UTC-4:00)

=== Draw 1 ===
Monday, March 7 3:00 PM

Sheet A	1	2	3	4	5	6	7	8	9	10	11	12	Final
New Brunswick (Sullivan)	0	1	0	1	0	0	1	0	2	0	1	0	6
Alberta (Northcott)	0	0	3	0	3	1	0	2	0	1	0	1	11

Sheet B	1	2	3	4	5	6	7	8	9	10	11	12	Final
British Columbia (Mason)	2	0	1	1	2	1	1	2	2	0	2	0	14
Ontario (Gurowka)	0	1	0	0	0	0	0	0	0	2	0	3	6

Sheet C	1	2	3	4	5	6	7	8	9	10	11	12	Final
Saskatchewan (Pickering)	2	0	3	0	3	0	4	0	1	0	1	0	14
Quebec (Tracy)	0	4	0	2	0	2	0	1	0	2	0	1	12

Sheet D	1	2	3	4	5	6	7	8	9	10	11	12	Final
Newfoundland (MacCharles)	0	0	0	1	0	1	0	1	0	2	0	2	7
Prince Edward Island (Burke)	0	2	1	0	1	0	1	0	1	0	2	0	8

Sheet E	1	2	3	4	5	6	7	8	9	10	11	12	Final
Nova Scotia (Snarr)	1	2	0	0	1	0	0	1	0	0	1	1	7
Northern Ontario (Grozelle)	0	0	0	1	0	1	1	0	2	1	0	0	6

=== Draw 2 ===
Monday, March 7 8:00 PM

Sheet A	1	2	3	4	5	6	7	8	9	10	11	12	Final
New Brunswick (Sullivan)	1	0	0	0	0	0	0	2	0	3	0	1	7
Newfoundland (MacCharles)	0	1	0	0	0	1	1	0	1	0	0	0	4

Sheet B	1	2	3	4	5	6	7	8	9	10	11	12	Final
Manitoba (Lerner)	0	0	1	0	1	0	2	0	1	1	3	0	9
British Columbia (Mason)	2	1	0	1	0	1	0	0	0	0	0	2	7

Sheet C	1	2	3	4	5	6	7	8	9	10	11	12	Final
Prince Edward Island (Burke)	0	0	0	3	0	0	0	0	2	0	1	0	6
Ontario (Gurowka)	0	0	0	0	1	1	1	1	0	2	0	2	8

Sheet D	1	2	3	4	5	6	7	8	9	10	11	12	Final
Alberta (Northcott)	0	0	2	0	3	0	3	0	1	0	2	0	11
Nova Scotia (Snarr)	1	0	0	2	0	2	0	2	0	1	0	1	9

Sheet E	1	2	3	4	5	6	7	8	9	10	11	12	Final
Quebec (Tracy)	0	0	0	3	0	4	4	0	0	3	2	0	16
Northern Ontario (Grozelle)	0	1	0	0	1	0	0	2	1	0	0	2	7

=== Draw 3 ===
Tuesday, March 8 9:00 AM

Sheet A	1	2	3	4	5	6	7	8	9	10	11	12	Final
New Brunswick (Sullivan)	1	0	0	2	0	0	1	0	0	0	1	0	5
Ontario (Gurowka)	0	1	2	0	0	2	0	0	0	1	0	4	10

Sheet B	1	2	3	4	5	6	7	8	9	10	11	12	Final
Saskatchewan (Pickering)	0	2	0	1	1	2	0	0	0	3	0	4	13
Northern Ontario (Grozelle)	1	0	1	0	0	0	1	0	0	0	2	0	5

Sheet C	1	2	3	4	5	6	7	8	9	10	11	12	Final
Newfoundland (MacCharles)	0	2	0	0	1	3	0	0	0	1	0	1	8
Nova Scotia (Snarr)	2	0	2	2	0	0	1	0	1	0	1	0	9

Sheet D	1	2	3	4	5	6	7	8	9	10	11	12	Final
Manitoba (Lerner)	0	0	0	0	1	1	0	3	1	0	1	0	7
Prince Edward Island (Burke)	1	1	2	2	0	0	0	0	0	1	0	1	8

Sheet E	1	2	3	4	5	6	7	8	9	10	11	12	Final
Alberta (Northcott)	0	1	0	0	0	0	1	0	2	0	0	0	4
Quebec (Tracy)	1	0	0	1	0	1	0	1	0	1	2	1	8

=== Draw 4 ===
Tuesday, March 8 2:30 PM

Sheet A	1	2	3	4	5	6	7	8	9	10	11	12	Final
New Brunswick (Sullivan)	2	1	1	1	0	1	0	0	1	0	0	1	8
Manitoba (Lerner)	0	0	0	0	2	0	2	3	0	1	3	0	11

Sheet B	1	2	3	4	5	6	7	8	9	10	11	12	Final
Saskatchewan (Pickering)	0	0	0	1	1	0	0	1	0	2	0	1	6
Alberta (Northcott)	1	1	1	0	0	1	1	0	4	0	3	0	12

Sheet C	1	2	3	4	5	6	7	8	9	10	11	12	Final
Nova Scotia (Snarr)	0	1	0	2	0	1	0	0	0	1	0	2	7
Ontario (Gurowka)	4	0	3	0	0	0	0	1	4	0	1	0	13

Sheet D	1	2	3	4	5	6	7	8	9	10	11	12	Final
Newfoundland (MacCharles)	2	0	2	1	1	0	1	0	2	0	1	0	10
Quebec (Tracy)	0	1	0	0	0	3	0	1	0	2	0	1	8

Sheet E	1	2	3	4	5	6	7	8	9	10	11	12	Final
British Columbia (Mason)	0	1	1	0	0	4	0	3	0	1	1	0	11
Prince Edward Island (Burke)	1	0	0	2	1	0	2	0	2	0	0	1	9

=== Draw 5 ===
Wednesday, March 9 2:30 PM

Sheet A	1	2	3	4	5	6	7	8	9	10	11	12	Final
Newfoundland (MacCharles)	0	2	0	0	1	0	0	0	0	1	1	0	5
Saskatchewan (Pickering)	1	0	0	2	0	0	1	1	1	0	0	3	9

Sheet B	1	2	3	4	5	6	7	8	9	10	11	12	Final
British Columbia (Mason)	2	1	0	0	2	0	4	0	2	0	1	0	12
New Brunswick (Sullivan)	0	0	1	1	0	1	0	1	0	3	0	1	8

Sheet C	1	2	3	4	5	6	7	8	9	10	11	12	Final
Northern Ontario (Grozelle)	0	0	1	0	1	0	0	1	0	2	0	0	5
Alberta (Northcott)	0	2	0	2	0	2	2	0	2	0	2	3	15

Sheet D	1	2	3	4	5	6	7	8	9	10	11	12	Final
Nova Scotia (Snarr)	0	0	0	2	0	2	0	0	0	0	2	0	6
Manitoba (Lerner)	1	1	1	0	2	0	1	0	1	3	0	1	11

Sheet E	1	2	3	4	5	6	7	8	9	10	11	12	Final
Ontario (Gurowka)	0	0	4	0	0	0	1	0	0	3	0	3	11
Quebec (Tracy)	1	1	0	1	0	1	0	1	0	0	1	0	6

=== Draw 6 ===
Wednesday, March 9 8:00 PM

Sheet A	1	2	3	4	5	6	7	8	9	10	11	12	Final
Prince Edward Island (Burke)	0	0	1	0	1	0	1	0	1	0	2	0	6
New Brunswick (Sullivan)	2	2	0	1	0	3	0	1	0	1	0	3	13

Sheet B	1	2	3	4	5	6	7	8	9	10	11	12	Final
Nova Scotia (Snarr)	0	2	0	1	0	0	2	0	2	1	1	0	9
British Columbia (Mason)	3	0	1	0	0	1	0	2	0	0	0	0	7

Sheet C	1	2	3	4	5	6	7	8	9	10	11	12	Final
Northern Ontario (Grozelle)	1	0	0	1	1	0	2	0	2	2	1	1	11
Newfoundland (MacCharles)	0	2	2	0	0	3	0	2	0	0	0	0	9

Sheet D	1	2	3	4	5	6	7	8	9	10	11	12	Final
Quebec (Tracy)	0	0	2	0	1	0	1	1	0	0	1	0	6
Manitoba (Lerner)	0	1	0	1	0	1	0	0	3	1	0	2	9

Sheet E	1	2	3	4	5	6	7	8	9	10	11	12	Final
Ontario (Gurowka)	1	0	2	0	1	1	0	0	3	1	0	2	11
Saskatchewan (Pickering)	0	2	0	2	0	0	3	0	0	0	1	0	8

=== Draw 7 ===
Thursday, March 10 9:00 AM

Sheet A	1	2	3	4	5	6	7	8	9	10	11	12	Final
Alberta (Northcott)	0	4	2	0	0	6	0	1	0	0	1	0	14
Newfoundland (MacCharles)	0	0	0	1	0	0	3	0	1	2	0	0	7

Sheet B	1	2	3	4	5	6	7	8	9	10	11	12	Final
Ontario (Gurowka)	2	0	1	0	0	2	0	0	2	0	0	2	9
Northern Ontario (Grozelle)	0	2	0	2	2	0	0	1	0	0	1	0	8

Sheet C	1	2	3	4	5	6	7	8	9	10	11	12	Final
Manitoba (Lerner)	3	0	1	0	0	1	0	1	0	2	1	0	9
Saskatchewan (Pickering)	0	2	0	1	1	0	1	0	3	0	0	3	11

Sheet D	1	2	3	4	5	6	7	8	9	10	11	12	Final
Quebec (Tracy)	0	2	1	3	0	1	0	1	1	0	2	0	11
British Columbia (Mason)	1	0	0	0	2	0	1	0	0	1	0	3	8

Sheet E	1	2	3	4	5	6	7	8	9	10	11	12	Final
Prince Edward Island (Burke)	1	0	0	0	2	1	0	0	1	0	0	1	6
Nova Scotia (Snarr)	0	0	1	3	0	0	1	1	0	2	0	0	8

=== Draw 8 ===
Thursday, March 10 2:30 PM

Sheet A	1	2	3	4	5	6	7	8	9	10	11	12	Final
New Brunswick (Sullivan)	0	0	0	1	0	0	1	0	1	0	2	0	5
Nova Scotia (Snarr)	0	0	0	0	2	0	0	1	0	2	0	1	6

Sheet B	1	2	3	4	5	6	7	8	9	10	11	12	Final
Saskatchewan (Pickering)	1	1	0	1	0	1	2	0	1	2	1	0	10
British Columbia (Mason)	0	0	1	0	2	0	0	2	0	0	0	1	6

Sheet C	1	2	3	4	5	6	7	8	9	10	11	12	Final
Manitoba (Lerner)	0	1	0	3	0	2	1	0	2	0	4	1	14
Northern Ontario (Grozelle)	1	0	3	0	1	0	0	1	0	2	0	0	8

Sheet D	1	2	3	4	5	6	7	8	9	10	11	12	Final
Alberta (Northcott)	0	1	0	4	0	2	0	1	0	0	2	1	11
Ontario (Gurowka)	2	0	1	0	1	0	1	0	2	0	0	0	7

Sheet E	1	2	3	4	5	6	7	8	9	10	11	12	13	Final
Quebec (Tracy)	0	1	0	0	2	0	2	0	0	3	0	1	0	9
Prince Edward Island (Burke)	2	0	1	1	0	1	0	0	2	0	2	0	1	10

=== Draw 9 ===
Thursday, March 10 8:00 PM

Sheet A	1	2	3	4	5	6	7	8	9	10	11	12	Final
Saskatchewan (Pickering)	3	0	3	2	2	2	0	2	0	1	0	2	17
Prince Edward Island (Burke)	0	1	0	0	0	0	2	0	1	0	1	0	5

Sheet B	1	2	3	4	5	6	7	8	9	10	11	12	Final
New Brunswick (Sullivan)	1	2	0	1	0	2	0	1	0	0	2	0	9
Quebec (Tracy)	0	0	2	0	2	0	1	0	0	2	0	3	10

Sheet C	1	2	3	4	5	6	7	8	9	10	11	12	Final
Newfoundland (MacCharles)	0	3	1	1	0	0	2	0	0	0	1	0	8
Ontario (Gurowka)	1	0	0	0	1	1	0	1	2	1	0	3	10

Sheet D	1	2	3	4	5	6	7	8	9	10	11	12	Final
Manitoba (Lerner)	0	1	0	0	0	0	0	4	0	2	0	2	9
Alberta (Northcott)	1	0	2	0	0	1	1	0	1	0	2	0	8

Sheet E	1	2	3	4	5	6	7	8	9	10	11	12	Final
British Columbia (Mason)	2	2	0	3	0	2	0	0	1	1	0	1	12
Northern Ontario (Grozelle)	0	0	4	0	2	0	0	2	0	0	3	0	11

=== Draw 10 ===
Friday, March 11 9:00 AM

Sheet A	1	2	3	4	5	6	7	8	9	10	11	12	Final
Saskatchewan (Pickering)	0	3	4	3	0	0	1	1	0	1	0	1	14
New Brunswick (Sullivan)	0	0	0	0	0	2	0	0	1	0	2	0	5

Sheet B	1	2	3	4	5	6	7	8	9	10	11	12	Final
Newfoundland (MacCharles)	0	0	0	2	0	2	2	0	2	5	2	2	17
Manitoba (Lerner)	1	1	1	0	1	0	0	1	0	0	0	0	5

Sheet C	1	2	3	4	5	6	7	8	9	10	11	12	Final
British Columbia (Mason)	1	0	0	2	0	0	2	1	1	0	0	1	8
Alberta (Northcott)	0	0	2	0	1	2	0	0	0	2	3	0	10

Sheet D	1	2	3	4	5	6	7	8	9	10	11	12	Final
Nova Scotia (Snarr)	3	0	1	0	0	1	0	2	0	0	2	0	9
Quebec (Tracy)	0	1	0	0	1	0	1	0	0	2	0	1	6

Sheet E	1	2	3	4	5	6	7	8	9	10	11	12	Final
Northern Ontario (Grozelle)	0	0	0	0	1	0	0	2	0	1	0	1	5
Prince Edward Island (Burke)	3	2	1	3	0	2	1	0	1	0	2	0	15

=== Draw 11 ===
Friday, March 11 2:30 PM

Sheet A	1	2	3	4	5	6	7	8	9	10	11	12	Final
Northern Ontario (Grozelle)	2	0	2	0	0	0	1	0	0	2	0	1	8
New Brunswick (Sullivan)	0	3	0	1	2	1	0	2	1	0	3	0	13

Sheet B	1	2	3	4	5	6	7	8	9	10	11	12	Final
British Columbia (Mason)	0	1	0	4	0	0	1	0	2	1	0	3	12
Newfoundland (MacCharles)	1	0	2	0	0	1	0	2	0	0	3	0	9

Sheet C	1	2	3	4	5	6	7	8	9	10	11	12	Final
Prince Edward Island (Burke)	0	0	0	1	0	0	0	0	0	0	2	0	3
Alberta (Northcott)	0	0	0	0	2	1	1	1	1	1	0	0	7

Sheet D	1	2	3	4	5	6	7	8	9	10	11	12	13	Final
Nova Scotia (Snarr)	0	2	0	0	0	0	0	1	0	2	0	2	1	8
Saskatchewan (Pickering)	0	0	1	1	1	1	1	0	1	0	1	0	0	7

Sheet E	1	2	3	4	5	6	7	8	9	10	11	12	Final
Ontario (Gurowka)	1	0	0	1	1	0	1	2	1	0	0	2	9
Manitoba (Lerner)	0	1	2	0	0	1	0	0	0	2	1	0	7

== Tiebreaker ==
Friday, March 11 7:30 PM

Team	1	2	3	4	5	6	7	8	9	10	11	12	Final
Ontario (Gurowka)	1	1	1	0	1	0	0	1	0	1	0	0	6
Alberta (Northcott)	0	0	0	1	0	2	1	0	1	0	1	1	7

== Awards ==
=== All-Star Team ===
The media selected the following curlers as all-stars:

Position	Name	Team
Skip	Ron Northcott	Alberta
Third	Tom Howat	Ontario
Second	Bernie Sparkes	Alberta
Lead	Fred Storey	Alberta

=== Ross G.L. Harstone Trophy ===
George MacCharles was the first recipient of Ross Harstone Trophy, which is presented to the player chosen by their peers as the curler in the Brier who best represents Harstone's high ideals of good sportsmanship, observance of the rules, exemplary conduct and curling ability. The winner was announced prior to the 1967 Macdonald Brier.

Name	Team	Position
George MacCharles	Newfoundland	Skip
