= Ron Northcott =

Canadian curler (1935–2023)

- Curler
- Born: December 31, 1935; Innisfail, Alberta, Canada
- Died: May 15, 2023 (aged 87); Calgary, Alberta, Canada

Curling career
- Brier: 6 (1963, 1964, 1966, 1967, 1968, 1969)
- World Championship: 3 (1966, 1968, 1969)
Medal record
Men's curling
Representing Canada
World Curling Championships
Gold medal – first place	1966 Vancouver
Gold medal – first place	1968 Pointe Claire
Gold medal – first place	1969 Perth
Representing Alberta
Macdonald Brier
Gold medal – first place	1966 Halifax
Gold medal – first place	1968 Kelowna
Gold medal – first place	1969 Oshawa
Silver medal – second place	1963 Brandon

Ronald Charles Northcott, CM (December 31, 1935 – May 15, 2023), nicknamed "The Owl", was a Canadian three-time national and world curling champion and a Hall of Fame member.

Northcott was born in Innisfail, Alberta and raised in both Vulcan and Milo where his father, Charles was a store owner. Northcott began curling as a high school student at age fifteen in Vulcan, Alberta, and won a provincial high school championship in 1953, playing third for Barry Coleman.

Northcott's talents saw him eventually represent the province of Alberta at six Briers, Canada's national men's championship. Northcott's first Brier was in 1963, playing third for Jimmy Shields. The rink went 8–2 at the Brier, just one win shy of the champion Saskatchewan rink, skipped by Ernie Richardson. Northcott began skipping the next season, and won a second Alberta provincial championship in 1964. This sent him and his rink of Mike Chernoff, Ronald Baker and Fred Storey to the 1964 Macdonald Brier, representing Alberta. There, Northcott led his rink to a 5–5 record. 1965 marked the only year between 1963 and 1969 where Northcott did not win the provincial championship, having been eliminated from the Southern Alberta playdowns by his old high school skip, Barry Coleman. Northcott returned to the Brier in 1966 with teammates George Fink, Bernie Sparkes and Storey. Northcott led the rink to an 8–2 round robin record, forcing a tie breaker playoff against Ontario's Joe Gurowka rink. The team defeated Ontario 7–6 in the tiebreaker, sending them to represent Canada at the 1966 Scotch Cup, the World Curling Championships at the time. Northcott and company won all of their games at the Worlds, including defeating Scotland's Chuck Hay rink 12–5 in the final. Northcott, Fink, Sparkes and Storey returned to the Brier in 1967, but were less successful, going 7–3. The team returned in 1968 with Northcott's old skip Jimmy Shields throwing third, replacing Fink. At the 1968 Brier, the team went 9–1 en route to their second Brier championship. The team represented Canada at the 1968 Air Canada Silver Broom World Championships. This time, the team lost one game in the round robin (against Scotland's Chuck Hay), but avenged their loss in the final, defeating the Scots 8–6. The next year, Northcott played in his final Brier with Dave Gerlach replacing Shields at third. At the 1969 Macdonald Brier, the team went undefeated, winning all ten of their games. At the 1969 Air Canada Silver Broom, the team lost one game in the round robin to the American team, skipped by Bud Somerville finishing with a 6–1 round robin record. The team faced off against the U.S. again in the final, this time beating them, 9–6.

Northcott retired from competitive curling in 1979.

Ron Northcott was inducted into Canada's Sports Hall of Fame in 1970 and on its formation in 1973, into the Canadian Curling Hall of Fame. He was also inducted into the WCF Hall of Fame in 2013. In 1976, he was made a Member of the Order of Canada.

== Personal life ==
Northcott was married to Gerry McKay, and had two children. His paternal grandparents were immigrants from England and Norway. In addition to curling, Northcott was also a race horse owner. At the time of the 1963 Brier, he worked as an accountant for an oil supply firm. At the time of the 1966 Brier, he was an executive with Canadian Mannix Corporation in Calgary. After retiring from competitive curling, he worked in marketing tubular steel products to the oil industry.

Northcott died in Calgary on May 15, 2023, at the age of 87.
