= Dave Gerlach =

Canadian curler (1940–2020)

- Curler
- Born: July 2, 1940
- Died: October 22, 2020 (aged 80); Calgary, Alberta

Curling career
- Brier: 1 (1969)
- World Championship: 1 (1969)
Medal record
Men's curling
Representing Canada
World Curling Championships
Gold medal – first place	1969 Perth
Representing Alberta
Macdonald Brier
Gold medal – first place	1969 Oshawa

David Fredrick Gerlach (July 2, 1940 – October 22, 2020) was a Canadian curler. He played as the third on the Ron Northcott rink that won the 1969 Brier and World Championship.

Gerlach was the son of Fritz and Ida Gerlach, and grew up in the Stettler, Alberta area, and graduated high school from the Botha School in Botha, Alberta.

Gerlach was a police officer with the Calgary Police Service when he won the Canadian Police Curling Championship in 1967, 1968, 1969, 1970 and 1972. Before becoming a police officer, Gerlach was a farmer in Stettler, Alberta. He returned to Stettler to farm in the 1970s, and worked as a car salesman. In 1981, he started a business selling pictures.

Gerlach was married twice and had three daughters.
