= Glen Campbell (curler) =

Canadian curler

- Curler
- Born: September 23, 1916; Avonlea, Saskatchewan
- Died: February 1, 2005 (aged 88); Regina, Saskatchewan

Team
- Curling club: Avonlea Curling Club

Curling career
- Brier: 6 (1947, 1954, 1955, 1957, 1961, 1966)
Medal record
Representing Saskatchewan
Macdonald Brier
Gold medal – first place	1955 Regina
Silver medal – second place	1954 Edmonton
Silver medal – second place	1957 Kingston
Silver medal – second place	1961 Calgary
Bronze medal – third place	1966 Halifax
Bronze medal – third place	1947 Halifax

Glen Miller Campbell (September 23, 1916 – February 1, 2005) was a Canadian curler. He played as second on a team consisting of 3 of his brothers, winning the 1955 Brier.
