= Bob Pickering =

Canadian politician

Bob "Pee Wee" Pickering
- Curler
- Born: September 19, 1932; Wilcox, Saskatchewan, Canada
- Died: June 24, 2015 (aged 82); Alberta, Canada

Team
- Curling club: Avonlea CC, Avonlea, SK

Curling career
- Brier: 6 (1961, 1966, 1968, 1969, 1970, 1971)
Medal record
Men's Curling
Representing Saskatchewan
Macdonald Brier
Silver medal – second place	1961 Calgary
Silver medal – second place	1968 Kelowna
Bronze medal – third place	1966 Halifax
Bronze medal – third place	1969 Oshawa
Bronze medal – third place	1971 Quebec City

Robert Hugh Pickering

MLA for Bengough-Milestone
- In office 1978–1991
- Preceded by: David Hadley Lange
- Succeeded by: Judy Bradley

Personal details
- Party: Progressive Conservative

Robert Hugh (Bob) "Pee Wee" Pickering (September 19, 1932 – June 24, 2015) was a Canadian farmer, curler and former political figure in Saskatchewan. He represented Bengough-Milestone from 1978 to 1991 in the Legislative Assembly of Saskatchewan as a Progressive Conservative.

== Life and career ==
Pickering was born in Wilcox, Saskatchewan, in 1932, the son of Leslie Pickering. In 1960, Pickering married Dorothy Ann Somerville. They had three children.

Pickering died June 24, 2015, in Alberta.

=== Curling career ===
Pickering, known for having the "World's highest backswing" was also a Saskatchewan men's curling champion. Pickering, as a skip won 4 consecutive provincial titles between 1968 and 1971, and also won in 1966 and as a lead in 1961. Pickering represented Saskatchewan at six Briers; finishing second (8-2) in 1961 playing for the John Keyes rink, tied for third (7-3) in 1966, second (8-2) in 1968, tied for third (7-3) in 1969, fourth (6-4) in 1970 and third (8-3) in 1971.

Pickering was named to the Canadian Curling Hall of Fame in 1974.

=== Political career ===
He served in the Saskatchewan cabinet as Minister of Rural Affairs, as Minister of Rural Development and as Minister of Parks and Renewable Resources. Pickering was dropped from cabinet in January 1985. In the previous year, Pickering had been charged with impaired driving and leaving the scene of an accident.
