= 1968 Air Canada Silver Broom =

- Host city: Pointe-Claire, Quebec, Canada
- Arena: Pointe Claire Arena
- Dates: March 20–24, 1968
- Winner: Canada
- Curling club: Calgary CC, Calgary
- Skip: Ron Northcott
- Third: Jimmy Shields
- Second: Bernie Sparkes
- Lead: Fred Storey
- Finalist: Scotland (Chuck Hay)

The 1968 Air Canada Silver Broom, the men's world curling championship, was held in Pointe-Claire, Quebec, Canada at the Pointe Claire Arena.

== Teams ==
| Canada | France | Germany | Norway |
| Calgary CC, Calgary Skip: Ron Northcott; Third: Jimmy Shields; Second: Bernie Sparkes; Lead: Fred Storey | Mont d'Arbois CC, Megève Fourth: Pierre Boan; Third: Martino Parodi; Skip: Guy Parodi*; Lead: Francois Parodi | EC Bad Tölz Skip: Werner Fischer-Weppler; Third: Herbert Kellner; Second: Rolf Klug; Lead: Heinz Kellner | Bygdøy CC, Oslo Skip: Thor Andresen; Third: Lars Askersrud; Second: Øivind Tandberg; Lead: Anders Landemoen |
| Scotland | Sweden | Switzerland | United States |
| Kilgraston & Moncrieffe CC, Perth Skip: Chuck Hay; Third: John Bryden; Second: Alan Glen; Lead: David Howie | IF Göta, Karlstad Fourth: Roy Berglöf; Skip: Kjell Grengmark**; Second: Sven Carlsson; Lead: Stig Håkansson | Thun CC, Thun Skip: Franz Marti; Third: Ueli Stauffer; Second: Peter Staudenmann; Lead: Rudolf Rütti | Superior CC, Wisconsin Skip: Bud Somerville; Third: Bill Strum; Second: Al Gagne; Lead: Tom Wright |

*Throws second stones.
**Throws third stones.

== Standings ==
| Country | Skip | W | L |
|---|---|---|---|
| Scotland | Chuck Hay | 7 | 0 |
| Canada | Ron Northcott | 6 | 1 |
| United States | Bud Somerville | 5 | 2 |
| Sweden | Kjell Grengmark | 4 | 3 |
| France | Guy Parodi | 2 | 5 |
| Norway | Thor Andresen | 2 | 5 |
| Switzerland | Franz Marti | 2 | 5 |
| Germany | Werner Fischer-Weppler | 0 | 7 |

== Results ==
=== Draw 1 ===
| Team | 1 | 2 | 3 | 4 | 5 | 6 | 7 | 8 | 9 | 10 | 11 | 12 | Final |
| Scotland (Hay) | 1 | 1 | 0 | 3 | 1 | 1 | 0 | 4 | 0 | 4 | 1 | 0 | 16 |
| Germany (Fischer-Weppler) | 0 | 0 | 3 | 0 | 0 | 0 | 3 | 0 | 1 | 0 | 0 | 1 | 8 |

| Team | 1 | 2 | 3 | 4 | 5 | 6 | 7 | 8 | 9 | 10 | 11 | 12 | Final |
| Sweden (Grengmark) | 0 | 0 | 2 | 0 | 1 | 3 | 1 | 0 | 0 | 2 | 3 | 2 | 14 |
| France (Parodi) | 2 | 1 | 0 | 1 | 0 | 0 | 0 | 0 | 1 | 0 | 0 | 0 | 5 |

| Team | 1 | 2 | 3 | 4 | 5 | 6 | 7 | 8 | 9 | 10 | 11 | 12 | Final |
| Canada (Northcott) | 3 | 0 | 5 | 0 | 3 | 3 | 1 | 0 | 3 | 0 | 2 | 1 | 21 |
| Switzerland (Marti) | 0 | 1 | 0 | 3 | 0 | 0 | 0 | 1 | 0 | 2 | 0 | 0 | 7 |

| Team | 1 | 2 | 3 | 4 | 5 | 6 | 7 | 8 | 9 | 10 | 11 | 12 | Final |
| United States (Somerville) | 2 | 0 | 0 | 3 | 2 | 2 | 0 | 3 | 2 | 0 | 4 | X | 18 |
| Norway (Andresen) | 0 | 2 | 2 | 0 | 0 | 0 | 1 | 0 | 0 | 2 | 0 | X | 7 |

=== Draw 2 ===
| Team | 1 | 2 | 3 | 4 | 5 | 6 | 7 | 8 | 9 | 10 | 11 | 12 | Final |
| Canada (Northcott) | 0 | 2 | 1 | 1 | 0 | 0 | 2 | 0 | 0 | 2 | 0 | 2 | 10 |
| United States (Somerville) | 3 | 0 | 0 | 0 | 0 | 1 | 0 | 0 | 1 | 0 | 1 | 0 | 6 |

| Team | 1 | 2 | 3 | 4 | 5 | 6 | 7 | 8 | 9 | 10 | 11 | 12 | Final |
| Switzerland (Marti) | 0 | 0 | 2 | 0 | 0 | 2 | 0 | 1 | 4 | 1 | 0 | 1 | 11 |
| Norway (Andresen) | 1 | 1 | 0 | 4 | 2 | 0 | 1 | 0 | 0 | 0 | 1 | 0 | 10 |

| Team | 1 | 2 | 3 | 4 | 5 | 6 | 7 | 8 | 9 | 10 | 11 | 12 | Final |
| Scotland (Hay) | 1 | 1 | 0 | 2 | 2 | 0 | 1 | 0 | 4 | 0 | 2 | 0 | 13 |
| Sweden (Grengmark) | 0 | 0 | 0 | 0 | 0 | 1 | 0 | 3 | 0 | 2 | 0 | 1 | 7 |

| Team | 1 | 2 | 3 | 4 | 5 | 6 | 7 | 8 | 9 | 10 | 11 | 12 | Final |
| France (Parodi) | 3 | 2 | 1 | 1 | 1 | 2 | 0 | 0 | 2 | 1 | 0 | 0 | 13 |
| Germany (Fischer-Weppler) | 0 | 0 | 0 | 0 | 0 | 0 | 4 | 1 | 0 | 0 | 1 | 2 | 8 |

=== Draw 3 ===
| Team | 1 | 2 | 3 | 4 | 5 | 6 | 7 | 8 | 9 | 10 | 11 | 12 | Final |
| Sweden (Grengmark) | 1 | 4 | 3 | 3 | 0 | 3 | 0 | 0 | 1 | 0 | 6 | 1 | 22 |
| Germany (Fischer-Weppler) | 0 | 0 | 0 | 0 | 1 | 0 | 1 | 1 | 0 | 2 | 0 | 0 | 5 |

| Team | 1 | 2 | 3 | 4 | 5 | 6 | 7 | 8 | 9 | 10 | 11 | 12 | Final |
| Scotland (Hay) | 2 | 1 | 0 | 3 | 3 | 0 | 1 | 0 | 2 | 1 | 0 | 1 | 14 |
| France (Parodi) | 0 | 0 | 1 | 0 | 0 | 1 | 0 | 1 | 0 | 0 | 1 | 0 | 4 |

| Team | 1 | 2 | 3 | 4 | 5 | 6 | 7 | 8 | 9 | 10 | 11 | 12 | Final |
| United States (Somerville) | 2 | 1 | 1 | 1 | 0 | 4 | 0 | 3 | 0 | 2 | 2 | 1 | 17 |
| Switzerland (Marti) | 0 | 0 | 0 | 0 | 1 | 0 | 3 | 0 | 2 | 0 | 0 | 0 | 6 |

| Team | 1 | 2 | 3 | 4 | 5 | 6 | 7 | 8 | 9 | 10 | 11 | 12 | Final |
| Canada (Northcott) | 1 | 0 | 0 | 4 | 0 | 5 | 0 | 0 | 1 | 1 | 1 | 0 | 13 |
| Norway (Andresen) | 0 | 2 | 1 | 0 | 1 | 0 | 0 | 3 | 0 | 0 | 0 | 1 | 8 |

=== Draw 4 ===
| Team | 1 | 2 | 3 | 4 | 5 | 6 | 7 | 8 | 9 | 10 | 11 | 12 | Final |
| Norway (Andresen) | 0 | 3 | 0 | 1 | 0 | 2 | 0 | 0 | 0 | 2 | 2 | 2 | 12 |
| France (Parodi) | 1 | 0 | 3 | 0 | 3 | 0 | 1 | 1 | 2 | 0 | 0 | 0 | 11 |

| Team | 1 | 2 | 3 | 4 | 5 | 6 | 7 | 8 | 9 | 10 | 11 | 12 | Final |
| Switzerland (Marti) | 1 | 2 | 1 | 0 | 0 | 4 | 0 | 1 | 0 | 5 | 1 | 1 | 16 |
| Germany (Fischer-Weppler) | 0 | 0 | 0 | 3 | 1 | 0 | 1 | 0 | 1 | 0 | 0 | 0 | 6 |

| Team | 1 | 2 | 3 | 4 | 5 | 6 | 7 | 8 | 9 | 10 | 11 | 12 | Final |
| Canada (Northcott) | 0 | 1 | 1 | 0 | 1 | 0 | 1 | 2 | 0 | 0 | 1 | 0 | 7 |
| Sweden (Grengmark) | 1 | 0 | 0 | 1 | 0 | 1 | 0 | 0 | 1 | 0 | 0 | 1 | 5 |

| Team | 1 | 2 | 3 | 4 | 5 | 6 | 7 | 8 | 9 | 10 | 11 | 12 | Final |
| Scotland (Hay) | 3 | 1 | 0 | 1 | 0 | 1 | 0 | 0 | 1 | 2 | 0 | 2 | 11 |
| United States (Somerville) | 0 | 0 | 0 | 0 | 2 | 0 | 1 | 1 | 0 | 0 | 2 | 0 | 6 |

=== Draw 5 ===
| Team | 1 | 2 | 3 | 4 | 5 | 6 | 7 | 8 | 9 | 10 | 11 | 12 | Final |
| United States (Somerville) | 0 | 1 | 1 | 1 | 1 | 1 | 1 | 1 | 0 | 1 | 0 | 0 | 8 |
| Sweden (Grengmark) | 1 | 0 | 0 | 0 | 0 | 0 | 0 | 0 | 1 | 0 | 1 | 1 | 4 |

| Team | 1 | 2 | 3 | 4 | 5 | 6 | 7 | 8 | 9 | 10 | 11 | 12 | Final |
| Scotland (Hay) | 0 | 1 | 2 | 2 | 0 | 0 | 0 | 1 | 0 | 2 | 1 | 1 | 10 |
| Canada (Northcott) | 1 | 0 | 0 | 0 | 2 | 0 | 1 | 0 | 1 | 0 | 0 | 0 | 5 |

| Team | 1 | 2 | 3 | 4 | 5 | 6 | 7 | 8 | 9 | 10 | 11 | 12 | Final |
| Norway (Andresen) | 3 | 2 | 0 | 1 | 1 | 2 | 0 | 0 | 1 | 0 | 2 | 1 | 12 |
| Germany (Fischer-Weppler) | 0 | 0 | 1 | 0 | 0 | 0 | 3 | 2 | 0 | 2 | 0 | 0 | 8 |

| Team | 1 | 2 | 3 | 4 | 5 | 6 | 7 | 8 | 9 | 10 | 11 | 12 | Final |
| France (Parodi) | 1 | 0 | 2 | 1 | 2 | 0 | 0 | 1 | 1 | 1 | 2 | 1 | 12 |
| Switzerland (Marti) | 0 | 4 | 0 | 0 | 0 | 1 | 1 | 0 | 0 | 0 | 0 | 0 | 6 |

=== Draw 6 ===
| Team | 1 | 2 | 3 | 4 | 5 | 6 | 7 | 8 | 9 | 10 | 11 | 12 | Final |
| Scotland (Hay) | 1 | 3 | 0 | 5 | 0 | 2 | 0 | 2 | 0 | 0 | 4 | 2 | 19 |
| Switzerland (Marti) | 0 | 0 | 1 | 0 | 1 | 0 | 3 | 0 | 1 | 2 | 0 | 0 | 8 |

| Team | 1 | 2 | 3 | 4 | 5 | 6 | 7 | 8 | 9 | 10 | 11 | 12 | Final |
| Sweden (Grengmark) | 1 | 2 | 0 | 2 | 4 | 0 | 5 | 1 | 0 | 0 | 0 | 0 | 15 |
| Norway (Andresen) | 0 | 0 | 1 | 0 | 0 | 2 | 0 | 0 | 3 | 2 | 1 | 1 | 10 |

| Team | 1 | 2 | 3 | 4 | 5 | 6 | 7 | 8 | 9 | 10 | 11 | 12 | Final |
| United States (Somerville) | 0 | 2 | 0 | 5 | 1 | 1 | 3 | 0 | 0 | 0 | 2 | 0 | 14 |
| France (Parodi) | 2 | 0 | 1 | 0 | 0 | 0 | 0 | 1 | 0 | 1 | 0 | 1 | 6 |

| Team | 1 | 2 | 3 | 4 | 5 | 6 | 7 | 8 | 9 | 10 | 11 | 12 | Final |
| Canada (Northcott) | 5 | 3 | 0 | 0 | 1 | 0 | 0 | 3 | 1 | 2 | 3 | 1 | 19 |
| Germany (Fischer-Weppler) | 0 | 0 | 1 | 2 | 0 | 1 | 2 | 0 | 0 | 0 | 0 | 0 | 6 |

=== Draw 7 ===
| Team | 1 | 2 | 3 | 4 | 5 | 6 | 7 | 8 | 9 | 10 | 11 | 12 | Final |
| Canada (Northcott) | 2 | 1 | 1 | 0 | 2 | 3 | 3 | 0 | 4 | 5 | 0 | 2 | 23 |
| France (Parodi) | 0 | 0 | 0 | 3 | 0 | 0 | 0 | 1 | 0 | 0 | 1 | 0 | 5 |

| Team | 1 | 2 | 3 | 4 | 5 | 6 | 7 | 8 | 9 | 10 | 11 | 12 | Final |
| United States (Somerville) | 3 | 0 | 0 | 2 | 1 | 3 | 1 | 1 | 0 | 3 | 2 | 0 | 16 |
| Germany (Fischer-Weppler) | 0 | 0 | 3 | 0 | 0 | 0 | 0 | 0 | 1 | 0 | 0 | 1 | 5 |

| Team | 1 | 2 | 3 | 4 | 5 | 6 | 7 | 8 | 9 | 10 | 11 | 12 | Final |
| Scotland (Hay) | 0 | 3 | 1 | 0 | 4 | 0 | 1 | 1 | 0 | 3 | 0 | 0 | 13 |
| Norway (Andresen) | 1 | 0 | 0 | 2 | 0 | 2 | 0 | 0 | 2 | 0 | 1 | 0 | 8 |

| Team | 1 | 2 | 3 | 4 | 5 | 6 | 7 | 8 | 9 | 10 | 11 | 12 | Final |
| Sweden (Grengmark) | 4 | 2 | 0 | 0 | 0 | 3 | 2 | 4 | 4 | 1 | 0 | 0 | 20 |
| Switzerland (Marti) | 0 | 0 | 1 | 1 | 1 | 0 | 0 | 0 | 0 | 0 | 2 | 1 | 6 |

== Playoffs ==
=== Brackets ===
| Semi-Final | | | Final |
| | | | 1 | Scotland | 6 |
| 2 | Canada | 12 | 2 | Canada | 8 |
| 3 | United States | 2 |

=== Semifinals ===
| Team | 1 | 2 | 3 | 4 | 5 | 6 | 7 | 8 | 9 | 10 | 11 | 12 | Final |
| Canada (Northcott) | 0 | 2 | 0 | 4 | 1 | 1 | 4 | X | X | X | X | X | 12 |
| United States (Somerville) | 1 | 0 | 1 | 0 | 0 | 0 | 0 | X | X | X | X | X | 2 |

=== Final ===
| Team | 1 | 2 | 3 | 4 | 5 | 6 | 7 | 8 | 9 | 10 | 11 | 12 | Final |
| Canada (Northcott) | 1 | 0 | 1 | 2 | 1 | 0 | 0 | 1 | 0 | 2 | 0 | X | 8 |
| Scotland (Hay) | 0 | 1 | 0 | 0 | 0 | 1 | 1 | 0 | 1 | 0 | 2 | X | 6 |

1968 Air Canada Silver Broom Winners
(Canada)
Canada
8th title
