= George Fink =

Canadian retired curler

- Curler
- Born: c. 1940 (age 85–86)

Curling career
- Brier: 2 (1966, 1967)
- World Championship: 1 (1966)
Medal record
Men's curling
Representing Canada
World Curling Championships
Gold medal – first place	1966 Vancouver
Representing Alberta
Macdonald Brier
Gold medal – first place	1966 Halifax

George Frederick Fink (born c. 1940) is a Canadian retired curler. He played as third on the Ron Northcott rink that won the 1966 Brier and World Championship. He later worked in the oil and gas business, as CEO and president of multiple companies. At the time of the 1966 Brier, he was employed by Clarkson Gordon & Co.
