= Fred Storey =

Canadian curler (1932–2019)

- Curler
- Born: March 3, 1932; Empress, Alberta
- Died: December 2, 2019 (aged 87); Calgary, Alberta

Team
- Curling club: Calgary Curling Club

Curling career
- Brier: 7 (1960, 1963, 1964, 1966, 1967, 1968, 1969)
- World Championship: 3 (1966, 1968, 1969)
Medal record
Men's curling
Representing Canada
World Curling Championships
Gold medal – first place	1966 Vancouver
Gold medal – first place	1968 Pointe Claire
Gold medal – first place	1969 Perth
Representing Alberta
Macdonald Brier
Gold medal – first place	1966 Halifax
Gold medal – first place	1968 Kelowna
Gold medal – first place	1969 Oshawa
Silver medal – second place	1960 Fort William
Silver medal – second place	1963 Brandon

Frederick Lewis Storey (March 3, 1932 – December 2, 2019) was a Canadian curler from Calgary. He won three World Curling Championships and three Brier Championships playing as lead on the Ron Northcott rink.

Storey grew up in Empress, Alberta and moved to Calgary in high school, and won a provincial school boys title for Mount Royal in 1951, and finished runner up at that year's school boy championship (now the Canadian Junior Curling Championships) playing for the Bob Harper rink. He also played baseball in high school.

At the time of the 1960 Brier, he worked for Pacific Petroleums as chief clerk of inventory and equipment control. He was married in 1959 to Donna Chaput.
