= Bernie Sparkes =

Canadian curler

- Curler
- Born: October 15, 1940 (age 86); Claresholm, Alberta

Curling career
- Brier: 12 (1966, 1967, 1968, 1969, 1972, 1973, 1974, 1976, 1978, 1983, 1984, 1987)
- World Championship: 3 (1966, 1968, 1969)
Medal record
Men's curling
Representing Canada
World Curling Championships
Gold medal – first place	1966 Vancouver
Gold medal – first place	1968 Pointe Claire
Gold medal – first place	1969 Perth
Macdonald Brier
Representing Alberta
Gold medal – first place	1966 Halifax
Gold medal – first place	1968 Kelowna
Gold medal – first place	1969 Oshawa
Representing British Columbia
Silver medal – second place	1978 Vancouver
Bronze medal – third place	1976 Regina

Bernard Leslie Sparkes (born October 15, 1940) is a former world champion curler.

Sparkes's first major curling championship success came when he won the 1957 Alberta Schoolboys. He would later go on to win 4 Alberta (1966, 1967, 1968, 1969) championships and 3 Canadian Brier and World Championships (1966, 1968, 1969) He was voted all star second at 4 consecutive Briers as the second for the Ron Northcott team. He is a member of the Lethbridge Sports Hall Of Fame (baseball), the Southern Alberta Curling Hall Of Fame, the Canadian Curling Hall of Fame (1974) and the WCF Hall of Fame (2021). Sparkes moved to British Columbia in 1970 and went on to win 9 more men's provincial curling championships 1 Masters over 70 in 2014 and 1 mixed championship. He was elected to the B.C. Sports Hall Of Fame in 1995. He was elected to the World Curling Hall of Fame in 2021. He was elected to the BC Curling Hall of Fame in 2025 and the Alberta Sports Hall of Fame in 2025.

One of his leisurely pursuits is painting. He paints still life and animal paintings. One of his most famous paintings is a chair in a lawn, surrounded by bouquets and flowers.

At the time of the 1967 Brier, he was a stationary salesman. He was an avid baseball player in his youth, and was a member of the Brooklyn Dodgers organization.
