= Curling in Turkey =

Curling is a minor sport in Turkey. It is governed by the Turkish Curling Federation, in the past by the Turkish Ice Skating Federation, and has been a member of the World Curling Federation since 2009. The country's first dedicated curling venue is the Milli Piyango Curling Arena in Erzurum. Turkey is ranked 39th in the world in men's curling and 31st in women's.

As of November 2012, there are around 180 licensed curlers in the country, of which 120 are playing actively.

Turkey has already hosted four international tournaments, the 2011 Winter Universiade, the 2012 World Mixed Doubles Curling Championship, the 2012 European Mixed Curling Championship and the European Curling Championships – Group C competitions.

== Leagues ==
The Turkish Ice Skating Federation increased the number of curling leagues setting up the Second Curling League in the 2012-13 season. The First Curling League is played by 20 teams consisting of ten men's and ten women's teams in five groups each four teams. The competitions are held at the Milli Piyango Curling Arena in Erzurum, and will last until end of March 2013. The Second League teams to be promoted to the First League will be determined by play-offs at the end of the season.

Turkish Curling First League teams

Following teams compete in the First League's 2012-13 season

Men's

- Albayraklar S.K. (Erzurum)
- İzmit Alikahya S.K. (Kocaeli)
- Atatürk University S.K. (Erzurum)
- Çelebi S.K. (Erzurum)
- Derince Belediye S.K. (Kocaeli)
- Erzurum Gençlik S.K. (Erzurum)
- Narman S.K. (Erzurum)
- Nenehatun S.K. (Erzurum)
- Palandöken Gençlik S.K. (Erzurum)
- Şirintepe Gençlerbirliği S.K. (Kocaeli)

Women's

- İzmit Alikahya S.K. (Kocaeli)
- Atatürk University S.K. (Erzurum)
- Çelebi S.K. (Erzurum)
- Ejder S.K. (Erzurum)
- Erzurum Gençlik S.K. (Erzurum)
- Istanbul Technical University S.K. (Istanbul)
- Narman S.K. (Erzurum)
- Nenehatun S.K. (Erzurum)
- Şirintepe Gençlerbirliği S.K. (Kocaeli)
- Yakutiye Gençlik S.K. (Erzurum)

== International competitions ==
The country competed in its first event at the 2010 European Mixed Curling Championship, where they placed 23rd of 24 teams. They won one game, against the Netherlands.

Turkey's first participation in juniors category was in the 2013 European Junior Curling Challenge in Prague, Czech Republic, a qualification tournament for the 2013 World Junior Curling Championships.

Turkish national wheelchair curling team, which consisted of curlers all from İstanbul Büyükşehir Belediyesi S.K., made its debut in November 2012 at the 2013 World Wheelchair Curling Championship – Qualification Event in Lohja, Finland.

== National teams ==
=== Men's ===
Men's national curling team of Turkey ranks 35th as of mid-year rankings for the 2012–13 curling season coming up to an increase of five positions from the last season.

Position	Name	Club
Skip	Muhammet Oǧuz Zengin	Atatürk University
Third	Alican Karataş	Atatürk University
Second	Kadir Çakır	Atatürk University
Lead	Muhammet Çağrı Bayraktar	Anadolu University
Alternate	Yusuf Ziya Bayraktutan	Atatürk University

=== Junior men's ===
Turkish junior men's team debuted at the 2013 European Junior Curling Challenge, a qualification competition for the 2013 World Junior Curling Championships.

Position	Name
Skip	Alican Karataş
Third	Nuh Nar
Second	Melik Şenol
Lead	Adem Özdemir
Alternate	Burak Korucu

Coach: Celal Cüneyt İşgör

=== Women's ===
Turkey women's national curling team ranks 27th as of mid-year rankings for the 2012–13 curling season coming up to an increase of four positions from the last season.

Position	Name	Club
Skip	Öznur Polat	Atatürk University
Third	Elif Kızılkaya	Atatürk University
Second	Dilşat Yıldız	Atatürk University
Lead	Ayşe Gözütok	Atatürk University
Alternate	Şeyda Zengin	Atatürk University

=== Junior women's ===
Turkish junior women's team debuted at the 2013 European Junior Curling Challenge, a qualification competition for the 2013 World Junior Curling Championships.

Position	Name
Skip	Dilşat Yıldız
Third	Semiha Konuksever
Second	Burçak Şehitoğlu
Lead	Zeynep Özmen
Alternate	Burcu Korucu

Coach: Celal Cüneyt İşgör

=== Wheelchair ===
Position	Name	Club
Skip	Turhan Akalın	Istanbul B.B.S.K.
Third	Engin Kurt	Istanbul B.B.S.K.
Second	Savaş Şimşek	Istanbul B.B.S.K.
Lead	Birsen Sapmaz	Istanbul B.B.S.K.
Alternate	Berk Kamanlı	Istanbul B.B.S.K.

Coach: Gökçe Ulugay

== Achievements ==
=== Men's events ===
Winter Universiade

Year	Skip	Rank	GP	W	L
(Turkey) 2011	Oğuzhan Dikmen	9th	9	1	8
Total		1 / 2	9	1	8

European Curling Championships

The team advanced to the Group B competitions of 2012 European Curling Championships held in Karlstad, Sweden. Turkey's Alican Karataş competed in the round robin tournament of the Red Group, at which eight teams took part. He skipped to rank six winning two games and losing five.

Year	Skip	Group - Rank	GP	W	L
(Scotland) 2010	İlhan Osmanağaoğlu	C - 7th	6	1	5
(Denmark) 2011	İlhan Osmanağaoğlu	C - (bronze)	9	6	3
(Turkey) 2012	Muhammet Oğuz Zengin	C - (gold)	8	7	1
(Sweden) 2012	Alican Karataş	B - 6th	7	2	5
(Norway) 2013	Alican Karataş	B Yellow - 5th	7	3	4
(Switzerland) 2014	Alican Karataş	A - 4th	7	4	3
(Denmark) 2015	Alican Karataş	B Pool A - (bronze)	7	4	3
(Scotland) 2016	Alican Karataş	B Pool A - 4th	7	5	2
(Scotland) 2016	Alican Karataş	B Pool A - 4th	7	5	2
(Switzerland) 2017	Uğurcan Karagöz	B Pool B - (bronze)	7	5	2
(Estonia) 2018	Uğurcan Karagöz	B Pool A - 7th	7	1	6
(Sweden) 2019	Uğurcan Karagöz	B Pool B - (silver)	7	6	1
(Norway) 2021	Uğurcan Karagöz	B Gr. A - (gold)	7	6	1
(Sweden) 2022	Uğurcan Karagöz	A - 6th	9	4	5
(Scotland) 2023	Uğurcan Karagöz	A - 9th	9	1	8
(Scotland) 2024	Uğurcan Karagöz	B Gr. A - ?	?	?	?
Total		15 / 49	104	55	49

International tournaments

- 5th Debrecen Curling Bonspiel Cup - July 27–29, 2012 Debrecen, Hungary (gold)

=== Junior men's events ===
European Junior Curling Challenge

Year	Skip	Rank	GP	W	L
(Czech Republic) 2013	Alican Karataş	4th	7	4	3
Total		1 / 9	7	4	3

Coach: Celal Cüneyt İşgör

=== Women's events ===
Winter Universiade

Year	Skip	Rank	GP	W	L
(Turkey) 2011	Öznur Polat	10th	9	0	9
Total		1 / 2	9	0	9

European Curling Championships

The team advanced to the Group B competitions of 2012 European Curling Championships held in Karlstad. Elif Kızılkaya skipped to rank five in the round robin tournament, at which ten teams took part, with four wins against five losses, and missed so to advance to the page playoffs that were eligible for the four best teams.

Year	Skip	Group - Rank	GP	W	L
(Scotland) 2010	Canan Melis Akyıldız	C - (silver)	5	4	1
(Switzerland) 2010	Aysun Ergin	B - 10th	9	1	8
(Denmark) 2011	Öznur Polat	C - 5th	5	3	2
(Turkey) 2012	Öznur Polat	C - (silver)	7	6	1
(Sweden) 2012	Elif Kızılkaya	B - 5th	9	4	5
(Norway) 2013	Öznur Polat	B - 5th	9	5	4
(Switzerland) 2014	Öznur Polat	B - 5th	9	5	4
(Denmark) 2015	Dilşat Yıldız	B - 5th	9	6	3
(Scotland) 2016	Dilşat Yıldız	B - (silver)	9	7	2
(Switzerland) 2017	Dilşat Yıldız	A - 9th	9	2	7
(Estonia) 2018	Dilşat Yıldız	B - (silver)	9	7	2
(Sweden) 2019	Dilşat Yıldız	B - (gold)	9	7	2
(Sweden) 2021	Dilşat Yıldız	A - 7th	9	3	6
(Sweden) 2022	Dilşat Yıldız	A - 6th	9	5	4
(Scotland) 2023	Dilşat Yıldız	A - 8th	9	2	7
(Scotland) 2023	Dilşat Yıldız	A - 8th	9	2	7
(Finland) 2024	Dilşat Yıldız	A - 6th	9	5	4
Total		17 / 49	143	74	69

=== Junior women's events ===
European Junior Curling Challenge

Year	Skip	Group - Rank	GP	W	L
(Czech Republic) 2013	Dilşat Yıldız	B - 5th	6	4	2
(Finland) 2014	Dilşat Yıldız	A - 5th	6	2	4
(Czech Republic) 2015	Dilşat Yıldız	A - (silver)	9	6	3
Total		3 / 13	21	12	9

=== Mixed events ===
World Mixed Doubles Curling Championship

Year	Lead / Second	Rank	GP	W	L
(Turkey) 2012	İlhan Osmanağaoğlu; Elif Kızılkaya	21st	8	2	6
Total		1 / 5	8	2	6

European Mixed Curling Championships

Year	Skip	Rank	GP	W	L
(Scotland) 2010	İlhan Osmanağaoğlu	23rd	7	1	6
(Denmark) 2011	Öznur Polat	23rd	7	0	7
(Turkey) 2012	Murat Sağır	23rd	7	1	6
Total		3 / 8	21	2	19

=== Wheelchair ===
World Wheelchair Curling Championship – Qualification Event

Year	Skip	Rank	GP	W	L
(Finland) 2012	Turan Akalın	10th	10	1	9
Total		1 / 4	10	1	9

== See also ==
- Turkey Curling Team (Men)
- Turkey Curling Team (Women)
- Turkey Curling Team (Mixed)

=
