= 2011 European Curling Championships – Men's tournament =

2011 European Curling Championships Men's tournament
- Host city: Moscow, Russia
- Arena: Megasport Arena
- Dates: December 2–10
- Winner: Norway
- Curling club: Snarøen CC, Oslo
- Skip: Thomas Ulsrud
- Third: Torger Nergård
- Second: Christoffer Svae
- Lead: Håvard Vad Petersson
- Alternate: Thomas Løvold
- Finalist: Sweden (Niklas Edin)

The men's tournament of the 2011 European Curling Championships took place in Moscow, Russia from December 2 to 10. The winners of the Group C tournament in Tarnby, Denmark, Poland and Lithuania, moved on to the Group B tournament. The top seven men's teams at the 2011 European Curling Championships, Sweden, Norway, Denmark, the Czech Republic, Germany, Scotland, and France, will join hosts Switzerland in representing their respective nations at the 2012 Capital One World Men's Curling Championship in Basel. France played Russia in the World Challenge Games, where France defeated Russia after two games in a best-of-three series to win the final berth.

In the Group A competitions, round robin play finished with three teams tied at first and four teams tied at fourth. The Czech Republic emerged victorious from the four-way tiebreaker to qualify for the playoffs. The page playoffs saw Sweden slip past defending champions Norway and the Czech Republic edge Denmark, last year's runners-up. Norway soundly defeated the Czech Republic in the semifinal with a score of 5–2, and the Czech Republic dropped to the bronze medal game. The Czechs, skipped by Jiří Snítil, fell to Denmark's Rasmus Stjerne, who led his team in a 9–6 victory over Snítil and team. The final saw Sweden's Niklas Edin face Norway's Thomas Ulsrud in another rematch of the 2011 World Championships bronze medal game. Norway started out strong and continued to solidify their lead with two crucial steals, but Sweden bounced back with two successive deuces with last rock, tying the game up at 6–6. Ulsrud drew against two Swedish stones in the tenth end to secure Norway their second consecutive championship.

The Group C competitions in Tårnby, Denmark saw Poland and Lithuania advance to the Group B competitions, after Lithuania defeated Turkey in the semifinal. They joined fourteen other teams in Group B to create two groups of eight, and a round robin was held within those groups. Hungary and Russia advanced from the Red Group, and Ireland and England advanced from the Blue Group. Hungary advanced straight to the final after defeating Ireland, while Russia advanced to the semifinal against Ireland after defeating England. Russia won the semifinal over Ireland, sending Ireland to the bronze medal game. England stole a win over Ireland in the bronze medal game, winning with a score of 8–4. The home team Russia proceeded to defeat Hungary to win the Group B competitions. As a result, Russia and Hungary advance to the 2012 Men's Group A competitions, replacing Latvia and Italy, and Belarus and Croatia were relegated to the 2012 Men's Group C competitions.

== Group A ==
=== Teams ===
Czech Republic	Denmark	France	Germany	Italy
Skip: Jiří Snítil Third: Martin Snítil; Second: Jindřich Kitzberger; Lead: Marek Vydra; Alternate: Samuel Mokriš	Skip: Rasmus Stjerne Third: Johnny Frederiksen; Second: Mikkel Poulsen; Lead: Troels Harry; Alternate: Lars Vilandt	Fourth: Tony Angiboust Skip: Thomas Dufour; Second: Lionel Roux; Lead: Wilfrid Coulot; Alternate: Jérémy Frarier	Fourth: Felix Schulze Skip: John Jahr; Second: Christopher Bartsch; Lead: Sven Goldemann; Alternate: Peter Rickmers	Skip: Joël Retornaz Third: Silvio Zanotelli; Second: Davide Zanotelli; Lead: Marco Mariani; Alternate: Marco Pascale
Latvia	Norway	Scotland	Sweden	Switzerland
Skip: Ritvars Gulbis Third: Ainârs Gulbis; Second: Normunds Šaršūns; Lead: Aivars Avontinš	Skip: Thomas Ulsrud Third: Torger Nergård; Second: Christoffer Svae; Lead: Håvard Vad Petersson; Alternate: Thomas Løvold	Skip: David Murdoch Third: Glen Muirhead; Second: Ross Paterson; Lead: Richard Woods; Alternate: David Edwards	Skip: Niklas Edin Third: Sebastian Kraupp; Second: Fredrik Lindberg; Lead: Viktor Kjäll; Alternate: Oskar Eriksson	Skip: Sven Michel Third: Claudio Pätz; Second: Sandro Trolliet; Lead: Simon Gempeler; Alternate: Benoît Schwarz

=== Round-robin standings ===
Final round-robin standings

Key
Countries to Playoffs
Countries to Tiebreakers
Countries relegated to 2012 Group B

Country	Skip	W	L	PF	PA	Ends Won	Ends Lost	Blank Ends	Stolen Ends	Shot Pct.
Sweden	Niklas Edin	6	3	60	51	38	37	6	7	83%
Norway	Thomas Ulsrud	6	3	65	46	38	32	13	10	82%
Denmark	Rasmus Stjerne	6	3	58	43	33	34	16	10	80%
Switzerland	Sven Michel	5	4	54	53	37	36	15	6	79%
Czech Republic	Jiří Snítil	5	4	52	52	33	34	15	7	79%
Germany	John Jahr	5	4	53	52	38	35	13	11	75%
Scotland	David Murdoch	5	4	56	55	39	33	13	13	82%
France	Thomas Dufour	4	5	47	58	32	37	10	9	76%
Latvia	Ritvars Gulbis	2	7	49	64	38	38	8	9	75%
Italy	Joël Retornaz	1	8	42	62	33	43	10	9	73%

=== Round-robin results ===
==== Draw 1 ====
Saturday, December 3, 16:30

Sheet A	1	2	3	4	5	6	7	8	9	10	Final
Switzerland (Michel) 🔨	0	3	0	2	0	2	0	0	X	X	7
Czech Republic (Snítil)	0	0	1	0	1	0	0	1	X	X	3

Sheet B	1	2	3	4	5	6	7	8	9	10	Final
Sweden (Edin) 🔨	0	1	1	0	1	0	0	0	2	0	5
Germany (Jahr)	1	0	0	1	0	1	1	1	0	2	7

Sheet C	1	2	3	4	5	6	7	8	9	10	Final
Latvia (Gulbis) 🔨	2	1	0	1	2	1	0	0	1	X	8
Norway (Ulsrud)	0	0	2	0	0	0	2	1	0	X	5

Sheet D	1	2	3	4	5	6	7	8	9	10	Final
France (Dufour)	1	0	1	0	1	0	0	0	X	X	3
Denmark (Stjerne) 🔨	0	1	0	1	0	4	1	4	X	X	11

Sheet E	1	2	3	4	5	6	7	8	9	10	Final
Italy (Retornaz)	0	1	0	0	0	0	0	1	1	1	4
Scotland (Murdoch) 🔨	1	0	0	1	2	1	1	0	0	0	6

==== Draw 2 ====
Sunday, December 4, 8:00

Sheet A	1	2	3	4	5	6	7	8	9	10	Final
Denmark (Stjerne) 🔨	0	0	2	0	1	0	1	0	3	X	7
Latvia (Gulbis)	0	0	0	1	0	1	0	1	0	X	3

Sheet B	1	2	3	4	5	6	7	8	9	10	Final
Norway (Ulsrud) 🔨	2	1	0	0	0	1	0	0	2	X	6
Czech Republic (Snítil)	0	0	0	1	0	0	2	0	0	X	3

Sheet C	1	2	3	4	5	6	7	8	9	10	Final
Scotland (Murdoch) 🔨	3	0	0	0	0	1	0	1	0	1	6
Switzerland (Michel)	0	2	1	0	0	0	1	0	1	0	5

Sheet D	1	2	3	4	5	6	7	8	9	10	11	Final
Germany (Jahr) 🔨	1	0	0	1	0	0	0	1	0	1	3	7
Italy (Retornaz)	0	0	1	0	1	1	0	0	1	0	0	4

Sheet E	1	2	3	4	5	6	7	8	9	10	Final
Sweden (Edin) 🔨	0	1	0	2	2	0	3	X	X	X	8
France (Dufour)	0	0	1	0	0	1	0	X	X	X	2

==== Draw 3 ====
Sunday, December 4, 16:00

Sheet A	1	2	3	4	5	6	7	8	9	10	Final
Germany (Jahr)	0	0	2	0	3	1	1	0	0	3	10
Scotland (Murdoch) 🔨	1	1	0	1	0	0	0	2	1	0	6

Sheet B	1	2	3	4	5	6	7	8	9	10	Final
Italy (Retornaz)	0	0	1	0	2	0	0	0	1	X	4
France (Dufour) 🔨	1	1	0	2	0	1	1	1	0	X	7

Sheet C	1	2	3	4	5	6	7	8	9	10	Final
Sweden (Edin)	2	0	3	0	1	0	2	X	X	X	8
Denmark (Stjerne) 🔨	0	1	0	1	0	1	0	X	X	X	3

Sheet D	1	2	3	4	5	6	7	8	9	10	Final
Latvia (Gulbis)	1	0	1	0	1	0	4	0	1	X	8
Czech Republic (Snítil) 🔨	0	1	0	5	0	1	0	4	0	X	11

Sheet E	1	2	3	4	5	6	7	8	9	10	Final
Switzerland (Michel) 🔨	1	0	1	0	0	2	0	1	0	0	5
Norway (Ulsrud)	0	2	0	1	0	0	1	0	3	2	9

==== Draw 4 ====
Monday, December 5, 8:00

Sheet A	1	2	3	4	5	6	7	8	9	10	Final
Italy (Retornaz)	0	0	1	0	1	0	1	1	0	X	4
Sweden (Edin) 🔨	2	1	0	2	0	1	0	0	3	X	9

Sheet B	1	2	3	4	5	6	7	8	9	10	Final
Switzerland (Michel) 🔨	1	0	1	0	0	1	0	1	0	3	7
Latvia (Gulbis)	0	0	0	1	1	0	2	0	2	0	6

Sheet C	1	2	3	4	5	6	7	8	9	10	Final
Germany (Jahr) 🔨	0	0	2	1	1	1	0	1	0	1	7
France (Dufour)	0	1	0	0	0	0	1	0	2	0	4

Sheet D	1	2	3	4	5	6	7	8	9	10	Final
Norway (Ulsrud)	0	2	0	4	0	0	0	0	1	0	7
Scotland (Murdoch) 🔨	1	0	2	0	1	0	0	2	0	2	8

Sheet E	1	2	3	4	5	6	7	8	9	10	Final
Czech Republic (Snítil) 🔨	0	1	0	1	0	1	0	0	1	1	5
Denmark (Stjerne)	0	0	0	0	2	0	3	1	0	0	6

==== Draw 5 ====
Monday, December 5, 16:00

Sheet A	1	2	3	4	5	6	7	8	9	10	Final
France (Dufour)	0	1	0	0	1	0	1	0	0	X	3
Switzerland (Michel) 🔨	2	0	0	2	0	1	0	0	3	X	8

Sheet B	1	2	3	4	5	6	7	8	9	10	Final
Denmark (Stjerne)	0	0	2	0	0	0	2	1	3	X	8
Italy (Retornaz) 🔨	0	1	0	1	1	0	0	0	0	X	3

Sheet C	1	2	3	4	5	6	7	8	9	10	Final
Czech Republic (Snítil)	0	1	1	1	0	0	2	0	3	X	8
Scotland (Murdoch) 🔨	1	0	0	0	0	2	0	1	0	X	4

Sheet D	1	2	3	4	5	6	7	8	9	10	Final
Sweden (Edin)	0	1	1	0	2	0	1	0	0	1	6
Latvia (Gulbis) 🔨	2	0	0	1	0	1	0	1	0	0	5

Sheet E	1	2	3	4	5	6	7	8	9	10	Final
Norway (Ulsrud)	2	0	1	5	2	0	X	X	X	X	10
Germany (Jahr) 🔨	0	2	0	0	0	1	X	X	X	X	3

==== Draw 6 ====
Tuesday, December 6, 11:00

Sheet A	1	2	3	4	5	6	7	8	9	10	Final
Scotland (Murdoch) 🔨	0	0	0	1	0	0	0	0	1	X	2
Denmark (Stjerne)	0	0	1	0	0	0	2	2	0	X	5

Sheet B	1	2	3	4	5	6	7	8	9	10	Final
France (Dufour)	0	0	0	1	0	0	0	1	0	X	2
Norway (Ulsrud) 🔨	2	0	0	0	0	0	2	0	1	X	5

Sheet C	1	2	3	4	5	6	7	8	9	10	Final
Switzerland (Michel) 🔨	1	0	4	0	0	1	0	1	0	0	7
Sweden (Edin)	0	1	0	1	0	0	2	0	3	1	8

Sheet D	1	2	3	4	5	6	7	8	9	10	Final
Czech Republic (Snítil) 🔨	1	0	1	0	2	0	3	0	0	X	7
Germany (Jahr)	0	0	0	1	0	1	0	1	1	X	4

Sheet E	1	2	3	4	5	6	7	8	9	10	Final
Latvia (Gulbis) 🔨	0	1	0	1	0	0	0	1	1	1	5
Italy (Retornaz)	0	0	1	0	2	0	1	0	0	0	4

==== Draw 7 ====
Tuesday, December 6, 20:00

Sheet A	1	2	3	4	5	6	7	8	9	10	11	Final
Sweden (Edin) 🔨	2	0	2	0	0	3	0	0	1	0	1	9
Norway (Ulsrud)	0	2	0	1	1	0	1	2	0	1	0	8

Sheet B	1	2	3	4	5	6	7	8	9	10	Final
Latvia (Gulbis) 🔨	0	0	1	0	1	0	2	0	0	X	4
Scotland (Murdoch)	1	0	0	1	0	2	0	3	1	X	8

Sheet C	1	2	3	4	5	6	7	8	9	10	Final
Denmark (Stjerne)	0	0	0	0	3	0	3	0	0	2	8
Germany (Jahr) 🔨	0	1	0	0	0	1	0	2	2	0	6

Sheet D	1	2	3	4	5	6	7	8	9	10	Final
Italy (Retornaz) 🔨	1	0	2	0	0	0	3	2	1	X	9
Switzerland (Michel)	0	1	0	1	1	1	0	0	0	X	4

Sheet E	1	2	3	4	5	6	7	8	9	10	Final
France (Dufour)	1	0	0	2	0	1	0	3	X	X	7
Czech Republic (Snítil) 🔨	0	0	1	0	1	0	0	0	X	X	2

==== Draw 8 ====
Wednesday, December 7, 12:00

Sheet A	1	2	3	4	5	6	7	8	9	10	Final
Latvia (Gulbis)	0	1	1	0	1	0	0	1	0	X	4
Germany (Jahr) 🔨	1	0	0	2	0	1	0	0	2	X	6

Sheet B	1	2	3	4	5	6	7	8	9	10	Final
Czech Republic (Snítil) 🔨	0	3	0	1	0	0	0	1	0	1	6
Sweden (Edin)	0	0	1	0	1	1	0	0	1	0	4

Sheet C	1	2	3	4	5	6	7	8	9	10	Final
Norway (Ulsrud) 🔨	2	0	2	0	1	0	2	0	2	X	9
Italy (Retornaz)	0	1	0	0	0	2	0	1	0	X	4

Sheet D	1	2	3	4	5	6	7	8	9	10	11	Final
Scotland (Murdoch)	0	0	1	1	1	0	1	0	2	1	0	7
France (Dufour) 🔨	2	1	0	0	0	0	0	4	0	0	2	9

Sheet E	1	2	3	4	5	6	7	8	9	10	11	Final
Denmark (Stjerne)	0	1	0	0	1	0	1	0	2	1	0	6
Switzerland (Michel) 🔨	0	0	2	1	0	2	0	1	0	0	1	7

==== Draw 9 ====
Wednesday, December 7, 20:00

Sheet A	1	2	3	4	5	6	7	8	9	10	Final
Czech Republic (Snítil)	0	2	0	0	2	0	0	1	2	0	7
Italy (Retornaz) 🔨	0	0	2	1	0	2	0	0	0	1	6

Sheet B	1	2	3	4	5	6	7	8	9	10	11	Final
Germany (Jahr)	0	0	0	0	0	0	1	0	0	2	0	3
Switzerland (Michel) 🔨	0	0	1	0	0	0	0	1	1	0	1	4

Sheet C	1	2	3	4	5	6	7	8	9	10	Final
France (Dufour) 🔨	0	3	1	0	1	0	3	0	2	X	10
Latvia (Gulbis)	1	0	0	1	0	2	0	2	0	X	6

Sheet D	1	2	3	4	5	6	7	8	9	10	Final
Denmark (Stjerne)	0	0	1	0	0	0	0	2	1	0	4
Norway (Ulsrud) 🔨	1	1	0	2	1	0	0	0	0	1	6

Sheet E	1	2	3	4	5	6	7	8	9	10	Final
Scotland (Murdoch) 🔨	3	0	2	0	2	0	2	X	X	X	9
Sweden (Edin)	0	2	0	1	0	0	0	X	X	X	3

=== World Challenge Games ===
==== Challenge 1 ====
Friday, December 9, 20:00

Sheet A	1	2	3	4	5	6	7	8	9	10	Final
France (Dufour) 🔨	2	0	0	5	0	1	0	2	X	X	10
Russia (Tselousov)	0	2	0	0	1	0	1	0	X	X	4

==== Challenge 2 ====
Saturday, December 10, 9:30

Team	1	2	3	4	5	6	7	8	9	10	Final
France (Dufour) 🔨	2	0	2	0	1	1	2	0	2	X	10
Russia (Tselousov)	0	2	0	2	0	0	0	2	0	X	6

France moves on to the 2012 World Men's Championship.

=== Tiebreakers ===
Round 1		To Page Playoffs
Switzerland	2
Scotland	8	Scotland	5
Germany	4	Czech Republic	7
Czech Republic	7

==== Round 1 ====
Thursday, December 8, 8:00

Sheet C	1	2	3	4	5	6	7	8	9	10	Final
Switzerland (Michel)	0	0	2	0	0	0	X	X	X	X	2
Scotland (Murdoch) 🔨	0	2	0	2	3	1	X	X	X	X	8

Player percentages
Switzerland		Scotland	
Simon Gempeler	83%	Richard Woods	92%
Sandro Trolliet	98%	Ross Paterson	90%
Claudio Pätz	90%	Glen Muirhead	81%
Sven Michel	73%	David Murdoch	85%
Total	86%	Total	87%

Sheet D	1	2	3	4	5	6	7	8	9	10	Final
Germany (Jahr)	0	1	0	1	0	0	1	1	0	0	4
Czech Republic (Snítil) 🔨	2	0	0	0	2	1	0	0	1	1	7

Player percentages
Germany		Czech Republic	
Sven Goldemann	83%	Marek Vydra	71%
Peter Rickmers	66%	Jindřich Kitzberger	93%
John Jahr	70%	Martin Snítil	93%
Felix Schulze	73%	Jiří Snítil	79%
Total	73%	Total	84%

==== Round 2 ====
Thursday, December 8, 14:00

Sheet E	1	2	3	4	5	6	7	8	9	10	Final
Scotland (Murdoch)	0	1	2	0	0	0	1	0	1	0	5
Czech Republic (Snítil) 🔨	3	0	0	0	0	1	0	2	0	1	7

Player percentages
Scotland		Czech Republic	
Richard Woods	90%	Marek Vydra	78%
Ross Paterson	89%	Jindřich Kitzberger	86%
Glen Muirhead	83%	Martin Snítil	76%
David Murdoch	78%	Jiří Snítil	79%
Total	85%	Total	80%

=== Playoffs ===
Page playoff system
1	Sweden	5
2	Norway	4
3	Denmark	8
4	Czech Republic	9

Semifinal
2	Norway	5
4	Czech Republic	2

Gold-medal game
1	Sweden	6
2	Norway	7

Bronze-medal game
4	Czech Republic	6
3	Denmark	9

==== Page 1 vs. 2 ====
Thursday, December 8, 20:30

Sheet A	1	2	3	4	5	6	7	8	9	10	Final
Sweden (Edin) 🔨	0	0	0	2	1	0	0	1	0	1	5
Norway (Ulsrud)	0	0	0	0	0	1	1	0	2	0	4

Player percentages
Sweden		Norway	
Viktor Kjäll	86%	Håvard Vad Petersson	78%
Fredrik Lindberg	90%	Thomas Løvold	81%
Sebastian Kraupp	85%	Torger Nergård	76%
Niklas Edin	78%	Thomas Ulsrud	76%
Total	85%	Total	78%

==== Page 3 vs. 4 ====
Thursday, December 8, 20:30

Sheet D	1	2	3	4	5	6	7	8	9	10	11	Final
Denmark (Stjerne) 🔨	0	1	0	1	0	2	0	0	2	2	0	8
Czech Republic (Snítil)	0	0	2	0	3	0	2	1	0	0	1	9

Player percentages
Denmark		Czech Republic	
Troels Harry	82%	Marek Vydra	56%
Mikkel Poulsen	76%	Jindřich Kitzberger	83%
Johnny Frederiksen	89%	Martin Snítil	95%
Rasmus Stjerne	74%	Jiří Snítil	82%
Total	80%	Total	79%

==== Semifinal ====
Friday, December 9, 13:00

Sheet B	1	2	3	4	5	6	7	8	9	10	Final
Norway (Ulsrud) 🔨	1	0	2	0	0	1	0	0	1	X	5
Czech Republic (Snítil)	0	0	0	1	0	0	0	1	0	X	2

Player percentages
Norway		Czech Republic	
Håvard Vad Petersson	85%	Marek Vydra	85%
Christoffer Svae	89%	Jindřich Kitzberger	76%
Torger Nergård	95%	Martin Snítil	95%
Thomas Ulsrud	88%	Jiří Snítil	65%
Total	89%	Total	81%

==== Bronze-medal game ====
Friday, December 9, 20:00

Sheet D	1	2	3	4	5	6	7	8	9	10	Final
Czech Republic (Snítil) 🔨	2	1	0	0	1	0	1	0	1	X	6
Denmark (Stjerne)	0	0	2	2	0	2	0	3	0	X	9

Player percentages
Czech Republic		Denmark	
Marek Vydra	99%	Troels Harry	78%
Jindřich Kitzberger	79%	Mikkel Poulsen	86%
Martin Snítil	91%	Johnny Frederiksen	98%
Jiří Snítil	66%	Rasmus Stjerne	86%
Total	84%	Total	87%

==== Gold-medal game ====
Saturday, December 10, 15:00

Sheet C	1	2	3	4	5	6	7	8	9	10	Final
Sweden (Edin) 🔨	1	0	0	1	0	0	2	0	2	0	6
Norway (Ulsrud)	0	2	1	0	1	1	0	1	0	1	7

Player percentages
Sweden		Norway	
Viktor Kjäll	94%	Håvard Vad Petersson	74%
Fredrik Lindberg	84%	Christoffer Svae	83%
Sebastian Kraupp	78%	Torger Nergård	78%
Niklas Edin	71%	Thomas Ulsrud	81%
Total	82%	Total	79%

2011 European Curling Championships – Men's Winner
(Norway)
Norway
5th title

== Group B ==
=== Teams ===
==== Red Group ====
Austria	Belarus	Finland	Hungary
Skip: Andreas Unterberger Third: Markus Forejtek; Second: Marcus Schmitt; Lead: Marcus Egretzberger; Alternate: Christian Sokele	Skip: Ihar Platonov Third: Yury Pavliuchyk; Second: Andrei Aulasenka; Lead: Yury Karanevich; Alternate: Dmitry Kirillov	Skip: Markku Uusipaavalniemi Third: Toni Anttila; Second: Kasper Hakunti; Lead: Joni Ikonen; Alternate: Tommi Häti	Fourth: Krisztián Hall Skip: György Nagy; Second: Gábor Ézsöl; Lead: Lajos Belleli; Alternate: Zsolt Kiss
Lithuania	Russia	Slovakia	Spain
Skip: Tadas Vyskupaitis Third: Vytis Kulakauskas; Second: Vidas Sadauskas; Lead: Mantas Kulakauskas; Alternate: Vygantas Zalieckas	Skip: Alexey Tselousov Third: Alexey Stukalsky; Second: Andrey Drozdov; Lead: Artur Razhabov; Alternate: Alexey Kamnev	Skip: Pavol Pitoňák Third: Frantisek Pitoňák; Second: Tomas Pitoňák; Lead: Peter Pitoňák; Alternate: Milan Kajan	Skip: Antonio de Mollinedo Third: José Manuel Sanguesa; Second: Carlos González; Lead: Angel García; Alternate: Carlos Vega

==== Blue Group ====
Belgium	Croatia	England	Estonia
Skip: Marc Suter Third: Thomas Suter; Second: Timo Verreycken; Lead: Thomas Lemmens; Alternate: Peter Suter	Skip: Alen Cadez Third: Drazen Cutic; Second: Robert Mikulandric; Lead: Ognjen Golubic; Alternate: Alberto Skendrovic	Skip: Alan MacDougall Third: Andrew Reed; Second: Andrew Woolston; Lead: Tom Jaeggi; Alternate: John Brown	Skip: Harri Lill Third: Erkki Lill; Second: Jaanus Lindre; Lead: Tanel Telliskivi
Ireland	Netherlands	Poland	Wales
Skip: Robin Gray Third: John Kenny; Second: Bill Gray; Lead: Neil Fyfe; Alternate: John Furey	Skip: Jaap van Dorp Third: Brian Doucet; Second: Floyd Koelewijn; Lead: Carlo Glasbergen; Alternate: Mark Neeleman	Skip: Jakub Glowania Third: Tomasz Ziolo; Second: Michael Zoltowski; Lead: Michael Koziol; Alternates: Jakub Chec	Skip: Stuart Hills Third: Andrew Tanner; Second: James Pougher; Lead: Richard Pougher; Alternate: Chris Wells

=== Round-robin standings ===
Final round-robin standings

Key
Countries to Playoffs
Countries relegated to 2012 Group C

Red Group	Skip	W	L
Hungary	György Nagy	6	1
Russia	Alexey Tselousov	6	1
Austria	Andreas Unterberger	5	2
Finland	Markku Uusipaavalniemi	4	3
Spain	Antonio de Mollinedo	3	4
Lithuania	Tadas Vyskupaitis	2	5
Slovakia	Pavol Pitoňák	1	6
Belarus	Ihar Platonov	1	6

Blue Group	Skip	W	L
Ireland	Robin Gray	6	1
England	Alan MacDougall	6	1
Estonia	Harri Lill	4	3
Poland	Jakub Glowania	4	3
Belgium	Marc Suter	4	3
Wales	Stuart Hills	2	5
Netherlands	Jaap van Dorp	2	5
Croatia	Alen Cadez	0	7

=== Round-robin results ===
==== Red Group ====
===== Draw 1 =====
Saturday, December 3, 7:30

Sheet F	1	2	3	4	5	6	7	8	9	10	Final
Russia (Tselousov)	0	1	1	0	0	1	2	0	0	2	7
Slovakia (Pitoňák) 🔨	2	0	0	2	1	0	0	1	0	0	6

Sheet G	1	2	3	4	5	6	7	8	9	10	Final
Finland (Uusipaavalniemi) 🔨	3	0	2	1	0	1	X	X	X	X	7
Spain (Mollinedo)	0	1	0	0	0	0	X	X	X	X	1

Sheet H	1	2	3	4	5	6	7	8	9	10	Final
Hungary (Nagy) 🔨	0	1	2	2	1	0	0	1	0	X	7
Belarus (Platonov)	0	0	0	0	0	0	1	0	2	X	3

Sheet J	1	2	3	4	5	6	7	8	9	10	Final
Austria (Unterberger) 🔨	0	2	0	3	1	0	4	2	X	X	12
Lithuania (Vyskupaitis)	0	0	1	0	0	1	0	0	X	X	2

===== Draw 2 =====
Saturday, December 3, 16:30

Sheet K	1	2	3	4	5	6	7	8	9	10	Final
Spain (Mollinedo)	0	1	0	0	0	0	0	X	X	X	1
Russia (Tselousov) 🔨	2	0	0	0	2	1	3	X	X	X	8

Sheet L	1	2	3	4	5	6	7	8	9	10	Final
Belarus (Platonov) 🔨	1	1	0	2	0	1	0	1	1	0	7
Austria (Unterberger)	0	0	2	0	4	0	1	0	0	1	8

===== Draw 3 =====
Sunday, December 4, 8:00

Sheet F	1	2	3	4	5	6	7	8	9	10	Final
Spain (Mollinedo) 🔨	1	0	1	0	0	1	0	0	1	X	4
Austria (Unterberger)	0	0	0	0	1	0	0	1	0	X	2

Sheet G	1	2	3	4	5	6	7	8	9	10	Final
Belarus (Platonov)	1	0	0	0	0	1	X	X	X	X	2
Russia (Tselousov) 🔨	0	5	1	3	1	0	X	X	X	X	10

Sheet H	1	2	3	4	5	6	7	8	9	10	Final
Lithuania (Vyskupaitis)	0	1	0	1	0	1	0	0	1	X	4
Slovakia (Pitoňák) 🔨	1	0	2	0	3	0	0	3	0	X	9

Sheet J	1	2	3	4	5	6	7	8	9	10	Final
Finland (Uusipaavalniemi) 🔨	2	0	1	0	0	1	0	0	2	0	6
Hungary (Nagy)	0	2	0	3	1	0	0	1	0	1	8

===== Draw 4 =====
Sunday, December 4, 16:00

Sheet K	1	2	3	4	5	6	7	8	9	10	Final
Slovakia (Pitoňák)	0	1	0	1	0	1	X	X	X	X	3
Finland (Uusipaavalniemi) 🔨	1	0	3	0	3	0	X	X	X	X	7

Sheet L	1	2	3	4	5	6	7	8	9	10	Final
Hungary (Nagy) 🔨	1	0	2	4	0	0	1	X	X	X	8
Lithuania (Vyskupaitis)	0	2	0	0	0	1	0	X	X	X	3

===== Draw 5 =====
Monday, December 5, 8:00

Sheet F	1	2	3	4	5	6	7	8	9	10	Final
Finland (Uusipaavalniemi) 🔨	1	2	1	0	1	0	2	0	3	X	10
Belarus (Platonov)	0	0	0	1	0	1	0	1	0	X	3

Sheet G	1	2	3	4	5	6	7	8	9	10	Final
Austria (Unterberger) 🔨	0	0	3	0	1	0	2	1	0	X	7
Slovakia (Pitoňák)	0	0	0	1	0	0	0	0	2	X	3

Sheet H	1	2	3	4	5	6	7	8	9	10	Final
Russia (Tselousov) 🔨	0	0	0	0	0	2	0	2	0	X	4
Hungary (Nagy)	0	1	1	2	1	0	2	0	1	X	8

Sheet J	1	2	3	4	5	6	7	8	9	10	Final
Lithuania (Vyskupaitis)	1	0	2	1	0	1	0	0	0	1	6
Spain (Mollinedo) 🔨	0	1	0	0	1	0	1	1	1	0	5

===== Draw 6 =====
Monday, December 5, 16:00

Sheet K	1	2	3	4	5	6	7	8	9	10	Final
Hungary (Nagy)	0	0	0	1	0	1	0	0	0	0	2
Austria (Unterberger) 🔨	1	0	0	0	1	0	0	1	0	1	4

Sheet L	1	2	3	4	5	6	7	8	9	10	Final
Finland (Uusipaavalniemi)	0	0	0	0	0	0	0	0	X	X	0
Russia (Tselousov) 🔨	0	0	0	0	3	3	1	1	X	X	8

===== Draw 7 =====
Tuesday, December 6, 8:00

Sheet K	1	2	3	4	5	6	7	8	9	10	Final
Belarus (Platonov) 🔨	0	0	2	0	2	0	0	1	1	X	6
Lithuania (Vyskupaitis)	1	2	0	2	0	2	3	0	0	X	10

*Belarus ran out of time in the 10th end, and officially forfeited the game to Lithuania.

Sheet L	1	2	3	4	5	6	7	8	9	10	11	Final
Spain (Mollinedo) 🔨	0	2	0	1	1	0	1	0	2	2	1	10
Slovakia (Pitoňák)	3	0	1	0	0	2	0	3	0	0	0	9

===== Draw 8 =====
Tuesday, December 6, 16:00

Sheet F	1	2	3	4	5	6	7	8	9	10	11	Final
Slovakia (Pitoňák)	0	2	1	1	0	0	1	0	0	2	0	7
Hungary (Nagy) 🔨	2	0	0	0	3	0	0	2	0	0	1	8

Sheet G	1	2	3	4	5	6	7	8	9	10	Final
Lithuania (Vyskupaitis)	1	0	0	2	0	0	0	X	X	X	3
Finland (Uusipaavalniemi) 🔨	0	1	3	0	2	1	2	X	X	X	9

Sheet H	1	2	3	4	5	6	7	8	9	10	Final
Belarus (Platonov) 🔨	0	1	0	0	0	1	1	0	1	1	5
Spain (Mollinedo)	1	0	0	1	2	0	0	3	0	0	7

Sheet J	1	2	3	4	5	6	7	8	9	10	Final
Russia (Tselousov) 🔨	0	0	1	1	2	0	1	0	1	X	6
Austria (Unterberger)	0	0	0	0	0	1	0	1	0	X	2

===== Draw 10 =====
Wednesday, December 7, 16:00

Sheet F	1	2	3	4	5	6	7	8	9	10	Final
Lithuania (Vyskupaitis)	0	0	0	0	1	0	0	0	X	X	1
Russia (Tselousov) 🔨	1	1	1	0	0	0	2	2	X	X	7

Sheet G	1	2	3	4	5	6	7	8	9	10	Final
Spain (Mollinedo)	1	0	2	0	1	0	0	0	1	0	5
Hungary (Nagy) 🔨	0	1	0	2	0	3	0	1	0	0	7

Sheet H	1	2	3	4	5	6	7	8	9	10	Final
Austria (Unterberger) 🔨	1	0	1	0	0	4	1	0	0	1	8
Finland (Uusipaavalniemi)	0	1	0	2	0	0	0	1	1	0	5

Sheet L	1	2	3	4	5	6	7	8	9	10	Final
Slovakia (Pitoňák) 🔨	0	1	0	2	0	0	1	0	0	X	4
Belarus (Platonov)	1	0	3	0	0	3	0	2	2	X	11

==== Blue Group ====
===== Draw 1 =====
Saturday, December 3, 7:30

Sheet K	1	2	3	4	5	6	7	8	9	10	Final
Ireland (Gray)	0	0	0	2	2	1	0	1	0	0	6
Netherlands (van Dorp) 🔨	0	0	1	0	0	0	1	0	2	1	5

Sheet L	1	2	3	4	5	6	7	8	9	10	Final
Belgium (Suter) 🔨	0	0	0	2	1	0	1	0	2	1	7
Wales (Hills)	1	1	1	0	0	2	0	1	0	0	6

===== Draw 2 =====
Saturday, December 3, 16:30

Sheet F	1	2	3	4	5	6	7	8	9	10	Final
Netherlands (van Dorp)	0	0	0	2	0	1	1	0	0	X	4
Belgium (Suter) 🔨	1	0	1	0	4	0	0	1	1	X	8

Sheet G	1	2	3	4	5	6	7	8	9	10	Final
Estonia (Lill) 🔨	0	2	3	0	4	0	4	0	2	X	15
Croatia (Cadez)	0	0	0	1	0	1	0	3	0	X	5

Sheet H	1	2	3	4	5	6	7	8	9	10	Final
England (MacDougall) 🔨	0	1	0	1	0	2	1	0	4	X	9
Poland (Glowania)	0	0	1	0	0	0	0	1	0	X	2

Sheet J	1	2	3	4	5	6	7	8	9	10	Final
Ireland (Gray) 🔨	1	0	0	2	0	1	0	2	1	X	7
Wales (Hills)	0	1	1	0	1	0	1	0	0	X	4

===== Draw 3 =====
Sunday, December 4, 8:00

Sheet K	1	2	3	4	5	6	7	8	9	10	11	Final
Estonia (Lill)	0	0	1	0	0	2	0	0	1	2	0	6
England (MacDougall) 🔨	1	1	0	1	1	0	1	1	0	0	1	7

Sheet L	1	2	3	4	5	6	7	8	9	10	Final
Croatia (Cadez)	1	0	1	0	1	0	0	1	0	X	4
Poland (Glowania) 🔨	0	1	0	2	0	1	2	0	1	X	7

===== Draw 4 =====
Sunday, December 4, 16:00

Sheet F	1	2	3	4	5	6	7	8	9	10	Final
Belgium (Suter)	0	1	0	0	0	2	0	1	X	X	4
England (MacDougall) 🔨	1	0	1	2	1	0	3	0	X	X	8

Sheet G	1	2	3	4	5	6	7	8	9	10	Final
Poland (Glowania)	0	0	0	3	0	0	5	0	0	0	8
Wales (Hills) 🔨	0	1	0	0	1	0	0	2	1	2	7

Sheet H	1	2	3	4	5	6	7	8	9	10	11	Final
Netherlands (van Dorp) 🔨	0	0	1	0	2	0	1	0	2	0	1	7
Estonia (Lill)	0	0	0	1	0	1	0	1	0	3	0	6

Sheet J	1	2	3	4	5	6	7	8	9	10	Final
Croatia (Cadez)	0	0	1	1	2	0	1	0	0	X	5
Ireland (Gray) 🔨	1	2	0	0	0	1	0	3	2	X	9

===== Draw 5 =====
Monday, December 5, 8:00

Sheet K	1	2	3	4	5	6	7	8	9	10	Final
Belgium (Suter)	1	0	2	0	0	0	0	X	X	X	3
Poland (Glowania) 🔨	0	2	0	2	2	1	1	X	X	X	8

Sheet L	1	2	3	4	5	6	7	8	9	10	Final
Estonia (Lill)	0	2	0	0	0	0	0	1	0	X	3
Ireland (Gray) 🔨	1	0	1	2	0	2	0	0	2	X	8

===== Draw 6 =====
Monday, December 5, 16:00

Sheet F	1	2	3	4	5	6	7	8	9	10	Final
Wales (Hills) 🔨	1	1	0	0	1	0	1	0	0	1	5
Croatia (Cadez)	0	0	1	2	0	0	0	1	0	0	4

Sheet G	1	2	3	4	5	6	7	8	9	10	Final
England (MacDougall) 🔨	0	0	2	0	2	0	0	0	0	1	5
Netherlands (van Dorp)	0	0	0	0	0	1	1	1	1	0	4

Sheet H	1	2	3	4	5	6	7	8	9	10	Final
Poland (Glowania) 🔨	0	0	1	0	0	1	0	1	0	X	3
Ireland (Gray)	0	1	0	1	0	0	2	0	3	X	7

Sheet J	1	2	3	4	5	6	7	8	9	10	Final
Belgium (Suter) 🔨	0	1	0	0	1	1	0	2	0	X	5
Estonia (Lill)	2	0	0	2	0	0	2	0	2	X	8

===== Draw 7 =====
Tuesday, December 6, 8:00

Sheet F	1	2	3	4	5	6	7	8	9	10	11	Final
Poland (Glowania)	0	0	2	1	0	1	0	1	0	1	0	6
Estonia (Lill) 🔨	0	1	0	0	1	0	2	0	2	0	1	7

Sheet G	1	2	3	4	5	6	7	8	9	10	Final
Ireland (Gray)	0	3	0	2	0	0	0	1	1	0	7
Belgium (Suter) 🔨	1	0	1	0	0	3	3	0	0	1	9

Sheet H	1	2	3	4	5	6	7	8	9	10	Final
Wales (Hills) 🔨	4	0	0	0	1	0	0	1	0	X	6
England (MacDougall)	0	0	2	3	0	0	3	0	1	X	9

Sheet J	1	2	3	4	5	6	7	8	9	10	Final
Netherlands (van Dorp)	1	1	0	1	0	1	0	1	4	X	9
Croatia (Cadez) 🔨	0	0	2	0	0	0	2	0	0	X	4

===== Draw 8 =====
Tuesday, December 6, 16:00

Sheet K	1	2	3	4	5	6	7	8	9	10	Final
England (MacDougall)	0	0	2	0	2	3	2	X	X	X	9
Croatia (Cadez) 🔨	0	1	0	0	0	0	0	X	X	X	1

Sheet L	1	2	3	4	5	6	7	8	9	10	Final
Wales (Hills) 🔨	2	0	1	1	0	1	0	2	0	0	7
Netherlands (van Dorp)	0	1	0	0	2	0	1	0	1	1	6

===== Draw 9 =====
Wednesday, December 7, 8:00

Sheet F	1	2	3	4	5	6	7	8	9	10	Final
Estonia (Lill)	4	0	0	0	0	3	0	2	0	X	9
Wales (Hills) 🔨	0	2	1	0	0	0	0	0	2	X	5

Sheet G	1	2	3	4	5	6	7	8	9	10	Final
Netherlands (van Dorp) 🔨	0	0	0	1	0	1	1	0	1	0	4
Poland (Glowania)	0	0	1	0	3	0	0	1	0	1	6

Sheet H	1	2	3	4	5	6	7	8	9	10	Final
Croatia (Cadez) 🔨	2	1	0	0	0	0	1	0	X	X	4
Belgium (Suter)	0	0	3	3	1	2	0	4	X	X	13

Sheet L	1	2	3	4	5	6	7	8	9	10	Final
Ireland (Gray)	0	2	1	0	4	1	X	X	X	X	8
England (MacDougall) 🔨	0	0	0	1	0	0	X	X	X	X	1

=== Relegation game ===
Thursday, December 8, 8:00

Sheet J	1	2	3	4	5	6	7	8	9	10	Final
Belarus (Platonov) 🔨	2	0	1	0	0	0	0	0	1	X	4
Slovakia (Pitoňák)	0	1	0	1	1	1	1	1	0	X	6

=== Playoffs ===
Page playoff system
B1	Ireland	4
R1	Hungary	6
B2	England	2
R2	Russia	6

Semifinal
B1	Ireland	3
R2	Russia	6

Gold-medal game
R1	Hungary	4
R2	Russia	7

Bronze-medal game
B1	Ireland	4
B2	England	8

==== Page R1 vs. B1 ====
Thursday, December 8, 20:00

Sheet J	1	2	3	4	5	6	7	8	9	10	Final
Ireland (Gray)	0	0	0	2	1	0	1	0	0	0	4
Hungary (Nagy) 🔨	1	1	1	0	0	0	0	1	1	1	6

==== Page R2 vs. B2 ====
Thursday, December 8, 20:00

Sheet K	1	2	3	4	5	6	7	8	9	10	Final
England (MacDougall)	0	0	1	0	0	0	1	0	0	X	2
Russia (Tselousov) 🔨	2	0	0	1	0	0	0	0	3	X	6

==== Semifinal ====
Friday, December 9, 8:00

Sheet H	1	2	3	4	5	6	7	8	9	10	Final
Ireland (Gray) 🔨	0	0	0	2	0	1	0	0	0	X	3
Russia (Tselousov)	0	1	0	0	2	0	0	2	1	X	6

==== Bronze-medal game ====
Saturday, December 10, 9:30

Sheet K	1	2	3	4	5	6	7	8	9	10	Final
Ireland (Gray) 🔨	0	2	1	0	1	0	0	0	0	X	4
England (MacDougall)	0	0	0	1	0	1	1	2	3	X	8

==== Gold-medal game ====
Friday, December 9, 13:00

Sheet G	1	2	3	4	5	6	7	8	9	10	Final
Hungary (Nagy)	0	1	0	0	2	0	1	0	0	X	4
Russia (Tselousov) 🔨	2	0	2	0	0	1	0	2	0	X	7

Russia and Hungary advance to the 2012 Group A competitions.

== Group C ==
=== Teams ===
Greece	Iceland	Lithuania	Luxembourg	Poland
Skip: Georgios Arampatis Third: Nikolaos Zacharias; Second: Dionysios Karakostas; Lead: Alexandros Arampatsis; Alternate: Efstratios Kokkinellis	Skip: Hallgrimur Valsson Third: Kristjan Bjarnason; Second: Olafur Hreinsson; Lead: Savar Sveinbjörnsson; Alternate: Gunnar Haukur Johannesson	Skip: Tadas Vysukpaisas Third: Vytis Kulakauskas; Second: Vidas Sadauskas; Lead: Mantas Kulakauskas; Alternates: Vygantas Zalieckas	Skip: Marco Etienne Third: Jörg Moeser; Second: Alex Benoy; Lead: Claude Schweitzer	Fourth: Jakub Glowania Skip: Tomasz Zioło; Second: Michael Zoltowski; Lead: Michael Koziol; Alternates: Jakub Chec
Romania	Serbia	Slovenia	Turkey	
Skip: Allen Coliban Third: Bogdan Colceriu; Second: Bodgan Tăut; Lead: Adrian Panaitescu; Alternate: Mihai Mardare	Skip: Marko Stojanovic Third: Bojan Mijatovic; Second: Goran Ungurovic; Lead: Djordje Neskovic	Skip: Zvonimir Sever Third: Mitja Donosa; Second: Domen Zalkoar; Lead: Marjaz Prezelj; Alternate: Mitja Resman	Skip: İlhan Osmanağaoğlu Third: Muhammet Çağrı Bayraktar; Second: Kadir Çakır; Lead: Muhammet Oǧuz Zengin; Alternate: Yusuf Ziya Bayraktutan	

=== Standings ===
Final round-robin standings

Key
To Group C Final
To Group C Semifinal

Nation	Skip	Win	Loss
Poland	Tomasz Zioło	7	1
Turkey	Ilhan Osmanagaoglu	6	2
Lithuania	Tadas Vysukpaisas	6	2
Iceland	Hallgrimur Valsson	5	3
Luxembourg	Marco Etienne	4	4
Serbia	Marko Stojanovic	3	5
Romania	Allen Coliban	3	5
Greece	Georgios Arampatis	1	7
Slovenia	Zvonimir Sever	1	7

=== Round-robin results ===
==== Draw 1 ====
Friday, September 30, 15:00

Sheet 1	1	2	3	4	5	6	7	8	Final
Greece (Arampatis)	0	0	0	4	1	1	0	0	6
Iceland (Valsson) 🔨	1	1	3	0	0	0	1	2	8

Sheet 2	1	2	3	4	5	6	7	8	Final
Lithuania (Vysukpaisas) 🔨	1	0	1	3	2	3	X	X	10
Serbia (Stojanovic)	0	2	0	0	0	0	X	X	2

Sheet 3	1	2	3	4	5	6	7	8	Final
Luxembourg (Etienne)	0	1	0	3	1	0	2	0	7
Turkey (Osmanagaoglu) 🔨	1	0	3	0	0	2	0	3	9

Sheet 4	1	2	3	4	5	6	7	8	Final
Poland (Zioło)	0	0	1	0	3	0	2	0	6
Slovenia (Sever) 🔨	1	0	0	1	0	1	0	1	4

==== Draw 2 ====
Saturday, October 1, 08:00

Sheet 1	1	2	3	4	5	6	7	8	Final
Romania (Coliban) 🔨	4	0	4	0	1	0	1	X	10
Slovenia (Sever)	0	1	0	1	0	1	0	X	3

Sheet 2	1	2	3	4	5	6	7	8	Final
Luxembourg (Etienne)	0	0	0	1	0	2	1	0	4
Poland (Zioło) 🔨	0	0	1	0	3	0	0	1	5

Sheet 6	1	2	3	4	5	6	7	8	Final
Iceland (Valsson)	0	0	0	1	0	0	0	X	1
Serbia (Stojanovic) 🔨	1	1	1	0	1	1	1	X	6

Sheet 7	1	2	3	4	5	6	7	8	Final
Lithuania (Vysukpaisas)	0	0	0	1	0	2	2	X	5
Turkey (Osmanagaoglu) 🔨	0	0	4	0	3	0	0	X	7

==== Draw 3 ====
Saturday, October 1, 16:30

Sheet 1	1	2	3	4	5	6	7	8	Final
Iceland (Valsson)	0	3	1	1	0	0	5	X	10
Turkey (Osmanagaoglu) 🔨	1	0	0	0	2	1	0	X	4

Sheet 2	1	2	3	4	5	6	7	8	Final
Serbia (Stojanovic) 🔨	0	1	3	0	1	0	2	1	8
Slovenia (Sever)	1	0	0	3	0	3	0	0	7

Sheet 6	1	2	3	4	5	6	7	8	Final
Greece (Arampatis)	0	0	1	0	0	1	1	2	5
Poland (Zioło) 🔨	0	3	0	2	1	0	0	0	6

Sheet 7	1	2	3	4	5	6	7	8	9	Final
Luxembourg (Etienne)	0	0	1	1	1	3	0	0	2	8
Romania (Coliban) 🔨	1	2	0	0	0	0	1	2	0	6

==== Draw 4 ====
Sunday, October 2, 12:00

Sheet 1	1	2	3	4	5	6	7	8	Final
Lithuania (Vysukpaisas)	0	0	1	1	0	1	2	0	5
Poland (Zioło) 🔨	4	2	0	0	1	0	0	1	8

Sheet 2	1	2	3	4	5	6	7	8	Final
Greece (Arampatis)	0	0	0	0	2	0	0	X	2
Luxembourg (Etienne) 🔨	1	1	1	1	0	1	4	X	9

Sheet 6	1	2	3	4	5	6	7	8	Final
Serbia (Stojanovic) 🔨	3	1	1	0	1	0	2	X	8
Romania (Coliban)	0	0	0	1	0	1	0	X	2

Sheet 7	1	2	3	4	5	6	7	8	Final
Iceland (Valsson) 🔨	0	2	0	5	1	1	1	X	10
Slovenia (Sever)	1	0	1	0	0	0	0	X	2

==== Draw 5 ====
Sunday, October 2, 19:30

Sheet 1	1	2	3	4	5	6	7	8	Final
Serbia (Stojanovic)	0	2	0	0	0	0	X	X	2
Greece (Arampatis) 🔨	2	0	2	1	1	2	X	X	8

Sheet 2	1	2	3	4	5	6	7	8	9	Final
Romania (Coliban) 🔨	2	0	2	1	0	0	1	0	1	7
Iceland (Valsson)	0	2	0	0	0	2	0	2	0	6

Sheet 6	1	2	3	4	5	6	7	8	Final
Lithuania (Vysukpaisas)	2	0	0	0	3	0	4	2	11
Luxembourg (Etienne) 🔨	0	0	4	0	0	2	0	0	6

Sheet 7	1	2	3	4	5	6	7	8	Final
Turkey (Osmanagaoglu) 🔨	0	1	0	1	1	0	0	X	3
Poland (Zioło)	2	0	2	0	0	1	1	X	6

==== Draw 6 ====
Monday, October 3, 12:00

Sheet 1	1	2	3	4	5	6	7	8	Final
Slovenia (Sever) 🔨	2	0	1	2	0	1	0	X	6
Luxembourg (Etienne)	0	2	0	0	0	0	6	X	8

Sheet 2	1	2	3	4	5	6	7	8	Final
Poland (Zioło) 🔨	0	1	0	1	0	0	2	X	4
Serbia (Stojanovic)	0	0	1	0	0	1	0	X	2

Sheet 3	1	2	3	4	5	6	7	8	Final
Turkey (Osmanagaoglu)	0	4	2	3	0	2	2	X	13
Romania (Coliban) 🔨	3	0	0	0	2	0	0	X	5

Sheet 4	1	2	3	4	5	6	7	8	Final
Greece (Arampatis) 🔨	0	0	0	1	1	0	1	X	3
Lithuania (Vysukpaisas)	1	2	3	0	0	1	0	X	7

==== Draw 7 ====
Monday, October 3, 19:30

Sheet 1	1	2	3	4	5	6	7	8	Final
Poland (Zioło) 🔨	0	0	2	1	1	1	2	X	7
Romania (Coliban)	1	1	0	0	0	0	0	X	2

Sheet 2	1	2	3	4	5	6	7	8	Final
Turkey (Osmanagaoglu)	3	0	3	4	1	2	X	X	13
Greece (Arampatis) 🔨	0	1	0	0	0	0	X	X	1

Sheet 3	1	2	3	4	5	6	7	8	Final
Slovenia (Sever)	0	0	0	0	2	0	2	X	4
Lithuania (Vysukpaisas) 🔨	5	3	1	1	0	1	0	X	11

Sheet 4	1	2	3	4	5	6	7	8	Final
Luxembourg (Etienne)	1	0	0	0	1	0	1	X	3
Iceland (Valsson) 🔨	0	3	2	2	0	1	0	X	8

==== Draw 8 ====
Tuesday, October 4, 8:30

Sheet 1	1	2	3	4	5	6	7	8	Final
Turkey (Osmanagaoglu) 🔨	0	2	1	0	0	2	0	X	5
Serbia (Stojanovic)	0	0	0	2	1	0	0	X	3

Sheet 2	1	2	3	4	5	6	7	8	Final
Romania (Coliban) 🔨	0	2	0	0	0	0	X	X	2
Lithuania (Vysukpaisas)	3	0	2	1	2	2	X	X	10

Sheet 6	1	2	3	4	5	6	7	8	Final
Poland (Zioło) 🔨	0	0	3	0	0	2	1	0	6
Iceland (Valsson)	2	1	0	1	1	0	0	2	7

Sheet 7	1	2	3	4	5	6	7	8	Final
Slovenia (Sever) 🔨	4	2	1	1	2	1	1	X	12
Greece (Arampatis)	0	0	0	0	0	0	0	X	0

==== Draw 9 ====
Tuesday, October 4, 16:00

Sheet 1	1	2	3	4	5	6	7	8	Final
Iceland (Valsson)	0	0	0	0	0	0	X	X	0
Lithuania (Vysukpaisas) 🔨	1	1	1	3	1	1	X	X	8

Sheet 2	1	2	3	4	5	6	7	8	Final
Slovenia (Sever)	0	1	0	0	0	0	0	X	1
Turkey (Osmanagaoglu) 🔨	3	0	2	2	2	1	3	X	13

Sheet 6	1	2	3	4	5	6	7	8	Final
Romania (Coliban)	1	0	0	2	0	2	2	1	8
Greece (Arampatis) 🔨	0	3	2	0	1	0	0	0	6

Sheet 5	1	2	3	4	5	6	7	8	9	Final
Serbia (Stojanovic)	1	0	0	1	0	0	0	2	0	4
Luxembourg (Etienne) 🔨	0	0	1	0	0	2	1	0	1	5

=== Playoffs ===
Following the round robin, Poland, the leader of the group, automatically qualified to the Group B competitions in Moscow. The semifinal served as a tiebreaker for the second qualifying spot, which went to Lithuania. Poland and Lithuania were both already qualified to the Group B competitions, but played a gold medal game to determine the winner of the Group C competitions.

Semifinal			Gold-medal game
			1	Poland	7
2	Turkey	2	3	Lithuania	6
3	Lithuania	6

==== Semifinal ====
Thursday, October 6, 12:00

Sheet 6	1	2	3	4	5	6	7	8	Final
Turkey (Osmanagaoglu)	0	1	0	1	0	0	0	0	2
Lithuania (Vysukpaisas) 🔨	1	0	1	0	1	1	0	2	6

==== Gold-medal game ====
Thursday, October 6, 19:30

Sheet 5	1	2	3	4	5	6	7	8	9	Final
Poland (Zioło)	1	0	1	2	0	1	0	1	1	7
Lithuania (Vysukpaisas) 🔨	0	4	0	0	1	0	1	0	0	6

Poland and Lithuania advance to the Group B competitions in Moscow.
