= 2012 European Curling Championships – Men's tournament =

2012 European Curling Championships Men's tournament
- Host city: Karlstad, Sweden
- Arena: Löfbergs Lila Arena; Karlstad Curling Club
- Dates: December 7–15
- Winner: Sweden
- Skip: Niklas Edin
- Third: Sebastian Kraupp
- Second: Fredrik Lindberg
- Lead: Viktor Kjäll
- Alternate: Oskar Eriksson
- Finalist: Norway (Thomas Ulsrud)

The men's tournament of the 2012 European Curling Championships was held at the Löfbergs Lila Arena and the Karlstad Curling Club in Karlstad, Sweden from December 7 to 15. The winners of the Group C tournament in Erzurum, Turkey moved on to the Group B tournament. The top eight men's teams at the 2012 European Curling Championships, Sweden, the Czech Republic, Norway, Denmark, Russia, Switzerland, Scotland, and Finland, represented their respective nations at the 2013 World Men's Curling Championship in Victoria, British Columbia.

In the Group A competitions, Sweden remained relatively dominant, finishing with only one loss and qualifying for the playoffs, and the Czech Republic, Norway, and Denmark followed. In the page playoffs, Sweden blew past the Czech Republic, and Norway edged past Denmark. In the semifinal, Norway faced the Czech Republic in a rematch of last year's semifinal, and was able to move past them with a 6–4 victory. The bronze medal game saw the Czech Republic, skipped by Jiří Snítil, avenge a loss to Denmark's Rasmus Stjerne in last year's bronze medal game with a huge 12–4 win in eight ends. In the gold medal game, Sweden's Niklas Edin and Norway's Thomas Ulsrud faced off in a rematch of last year's final. Norway, attempting to win a third consecutive title, held an early lead in the fourth end, but the hometown favorite Sweden scored a deuce in the fifth end and stole two more in the sixth end to swing the momentum to their side. The two teams traded deuces in the next two ends, and Sweden clinched the win in the last end with a hit to score one point, wrapping up the game with a score of 8–5.

The Group C competitions in Turkey saw Turkey and Croatia advancing to the Group B tournament, joining fourteen teams in a two-group round-robin tournament. Latvia and the Netherlands finished at the top of the Blue Group, while Finland finished at the top of the Red Group. England won the last playoffs spot by defeating Italy in a tiebreaker. Latvia and the Netherlands each won their playoffs games against Finland and England, respectively, and Latvia advanced to the final, while Finland played the Netherlands in the semifinal. Finland won the semifinal, sending the Netherlands to play England for the bronze medal, where the Netherlands won the bronze medal with a score of 10–5. Finland then won the final over Latvia with a score of 7–4 in nine ends. Both Finland and Latvia advance to the Group A competitions, replacing Germany and Hungary, and Wales and Ireland were relegated to the Group C competitions. Germany was relegated to the Group B competitions for the first time in the history of the European Curling Championships. Finland played and won the World Challenge Games against France, advancing them to the World Men's Curling Championship.

== Group A ==
=== Teams ===
The teams are listed as follows:

Czech Republic	Denmark	France	Germany	Hungary
Skip: Jiří Snítil; Third: Martin Snítil; Second: Jakub Bareš; Lead: Jindřich Kitzberger; Alternate: Marek Vydra	Skip: Rasmus Stjerne Third: Johnny Frederiksen; Second: Mikkel Poulsen; Lead: Troels Harry; Alternate: Lars Vilandt	Fourth: Tony Angiboust; Skip: Thomas Dufour; Second: Wilfrid Coulot; Lead: Jérémy Frarier; Alternate: Lionel Roux	Skip: Andy Lang; Third: Markus Messenzehl; Second: Daniel Neuner; Lead: Andreas Kempf; Alternate: Daniel Herberg	Fourth: Krisztian Hall; Skip: György Nagy; Second: Gábor Ezsöl; Lead: Lajos Belleni; Alternate: Zsolt Kiss
Norway	Russia	Scotland	Sweden	Switzerland
Skip: Thomas Ulsrud; Third: Torger Nergård; Second: Christoffer Svae; Lead: Håvard Vad Petersson; Alternate: Thomas Løvold	Skip: Andrey Drozdov; Third: Alexey Stukalskiy; Second: Alexey Tselousov; Lead: Anton Kalalb; Alternate: Petr Dron	Skip: Tom Brewster; Third: Greg Drummond; Second: Scott Andrews; Lead: Michael Goodfellow; Alternate: David Murdoch	Skip: Niklas Edin; Third: Sebastian Kraupp; Second: Fredrik Lindberg; Lead: Viktor Kjäll; Alternate: Oskar Eriksson	Skip: Sven Michel; Third: Claudio Pätz; Second: Sandro Trolliet; Lead: Simon Gempeler; Alternate: Florian Meister

=== Round-robin standings ===
Final Round Robin Standings

Key
Countries to Playoffs
Countries to Tiebreakers
Countries relegated to 2013 Group B

Country	Skip	W	L	PF	PA	Ends Won	Ends Lost	Blank Ends	Stolen Ends	Shot Pct.
Sweden	Niklas Edin	8	1	68	39	40	25	8	16	82%
Czech Republic	Jiří Snítil	7	2	56	48	39	32	12	11	76%
Norway	Thomas Ulsrud	6	3	61	46	39	33	13	11	78%
Denmark	Rasmus Stjerne	6	3	67	48	38	31	10	15	77%
Russia	Andrey Drozdov	5	4	55	50	37	32	13	12	74%
Switzerland	Sven Michel	5	4	58	51	32	34	16	5	76%
Scotland	Tom Brewster	4	5	48	57	29	40	13	3	76%
France	Thomas Dufour	3	6	53	63	37	40	7	12	70%
Germany	Andy Lang	1	8	39	70	26	39	11	1	70%
Hungary	György Nagy	0	9	37	68	27	38	12	6	68%

=== Round-robin results ===
==== Draw 1 ====
Saturday, December 8, 9:00

Sheet A	1	2	3	4	5	6	7	8	9	10	Final
France (Dufour)	1	1	0	2	1	1	2	0	X	X	8
Hungary (Nagy) 🔨	0	0	2	0	0	0	0	1	X	X	3

Sheet B	1	2	3	4	5	6	7	8	9	10	Final
Denmark (Stjerne)	1	3	0	2	0	4	0	X	X	X	10
Germany (Lang) 🔨	0	0	2	0	2	0	1	X	X	X	5

Sheet C	1	2	3	4	5	6	7	8	9	10	Final
Switzerland (Michel)	0	0	1	0	1	0	0	2	0	2	6
Sweden (Edin) 🔨	0	3	0	2	0	1	1	0	0	0	7

Sheet D	1	2	3	4	5	6	7	8	9	10	Final
Russia (Drozdov)	0	1	0	1	0	0	1	0	0	1	4
Norway (Ulsrud) 🔨	1	0	3	0	1	0	0	0	1	0	6

Sheet E	1	2	3	4	5	6	7	8	9	10	Final
Scotland (Brewster)	0	0	1	0	2	0	0	0	2	0	5
Czech Republic (Snítil) 🔨	0	1	0	1	0	1	1	1	0	1	6

==== Draw 2 ====
Saturday, December 8, 19:00

Sheet A	1	2	3	4	5	6	7	8	9	10	Final
Norway (Ulsrud)	0	1	3	1	1	0	0	2	0	1	9
Switzerland (Michel) 🔨	2	0	0	0	0	0	3	0	1	0	6

Sheet B	1	2	3	4	5	6	7	8	9	10	Final
Sweden (Edin)	1	1	0	0	1	4	1	X	X	X	8
Hungary (Nagy) 🔨	0	0	2	0	0	0	0	X	X	X	2

Sheet C	1	2	3	4	5	6	7	8	9	10	Final
Czech Republic (Snítil)	1	2	0	1	1	0	2	0	1	X	8
France (Dufour) 🔨	0	0	2	0	0	1	0	1	0	X	4

Sheet D	1	2	3	4	5	6	7	8	9	10	Final
Germany (Lang)	0	0	1	0	0	1	0	0	X	X	2
Scotland (Brewster) 🔨	1	2	0	0	2	0	0	2	X	X	7

Sheet E	1	2	3	4	5	6	7	8	9	10	Final
Denmark (Stjerne)	0	1	0	0	3	2	0	1	0	1	8
Russia (Drozdov) 🔨	0	0	2	1	0	0	1	0	2	0	6

==== Draw 3 ====
Sunday, December 9, 8:00

Sheet A	1	2	3	4	5	6	7	8	9	10	11	Final
Germany (Lang) 🔨	0	1	0	1	0	0	0	2	0	1	0	5
Czech Republic (Snítil)	0	0	1	0	0	2	0	0	2	0	1	6

Sheet B	1	2	3	4	5	6	7	8	9	10	Final
Scotland (Brewster)	0	0	1	1	0	1	0	2	0	0	5
Russia (Drozdov) 🔨	1	2	0	0	1	0	1	0	2	1	8

Sheet C	1	2	3	4	5	6	7	8	9	10	Final
Denmark (Stjerne) 🔨	1	0	0	2	0	1	0	0	0	X	4
Norway (Ulsrud)	0	3	1	0	0	0	0	1	1	X	6

Sheet D	1	2	3	4	5	6	7	8	9	10	Final
Switzerland (Michel)	1	0	3	0	0	1	0	0	4	X	9
Hungary (Nagy) 🔨	0	0	0	1	0	0	2	1	0	X	4

Sheet E	1	2	3	4	5	6	7	8	9	10	Final
France (Dufour) 🔨	2	0	0	0	0	2	0	0	X	X	4
Sweden (Edin)	0	2	2	1	1	0	2	1	X	X	9

==== Draw 4 ====
Sunday, December 9, 16:00

Sheet A	1	2	3	4	5	6	7	8	9	10	Final
Scotland (Brewster)	0	0	1	0	0	0	X	X	X	X	1
Denmark (Stjerne) 🔨	2	1	0	0	1	5	X	X	X	X	9

Sheet B	1	2	3	4	5	6	7	8	9	10	Final
France (Dufour)	0	0	1	0	1	0	0	0	1	X	3
Switzerland (Michel) 🔨	0	2	0	1	0	0	2	1	0	X	6

Sheet C	1	2	3	4	5	6	7	8	9	10	Final
Germany (Lang) 🔨	1	0	0	0	0	0	X	X	X	X	1
Russia (Drozdov)	0	0	2	1	4	1	X	X	X	X	8

Sheet D	1	2	3	4	5	6	7	8	9	10	Final
Sweden (Edin)	0	0	3	1	4	0	X	X	X	X	8
Czech Republic (Snítil) 🔨	1	0	0	0	0	1	X	X	X	X	2

Sheet E	1	2	3	4	5	6	7	8	9	10	Final
Hungary (Nagy)	0	0	2	0	1	0	0	X	X	X	3
Norway (Ulsrud) 🔨	0	3	0	2	0	0	4	X	X	X	9

==== Draw 5 ====
Monday, December 10, 14:00

Sheet A	1	2	3	4	5	6	7	8	9	10	11	Final
Russia (Drozdov) 🔨	0	0	1	0	1	0	0	1	0	2	1	6
France (Dufour)	2	0	0	0	0	1	0	0	2	0	0	5

Sheet B	1	2	3	4	5	6	7	8	9	10	Final
Norway (Ulsrud)	1	0	0	1	0	0	2	0	2	0	6
Scotland (Brewster) 🔨	0	1	0	0	2	0	0	2	0	2	7

Sheet C	1	2	3	4	5	6	7	8	9	10	Final
Hungary (Nagy)	0	2	0	2	0	0	1	0	0	X	5
Czech Republic (Snítil) 🔨	0	0	2	0	1	0	0	1	3	X	7

Sheet D	1	2	3	4	5	6	7	8	9	10	Final
Denmark (Stjerne)	0	1	0	2	1	0	0	1	0	X	5
Switzerland (Michel) 🔨	0	0	4	0	0	0	1	0	3	X	8

Sheet E	1	2	3	4	5	6	7	8	9	10	Final
Sweden (Edin) 🔨	2	0	3	0	2	2	X	X	X	X	9
Germany (Lang)	0	1	0	1	0	0	X	X	X	X	2

==== Draw 6 ====
Tuesday, December 11, 8:00

Sheet A	1	2	3	4	5	6	7	8	9	10	Final
Czech Republic (Snítil)	1	0	1	0	2	0	1	0	0	0	5
Norway (Ulsrud) 🔨	0	3	0	2	0	0	0	1	1	1	8

Sheet B	1	2	3	4	5	6	7	8	9	10	Final
Russia (Drozdov)	0	0	1	0	0	1	0	X	X	X	2
Sweden (Edin) 🔨	0	3	0	2	2	0	1	X	X	X	8

Sheet C	1	2	3	4	5	6	7	8	9	10	Final
France (Dufour) 🔨	1	0	0	1	1	0	0	1	0	0	4
Denmark (Stjerne)	0	2	0	0	0	0	3	0	1	2	8

Sheet D	1	2	3	4	5	6	7	8	9	10	Final
Hungary (Nagy) 🔨	0	0	0	1	0	0	2	1	1	0	5
Germany (Lang)	0	2	1	0	0	2	0	0	0	1	6

Sheet E	1	2	3	4	5	6	7	8	9	10	Final
Switzerland (Michel) 🔨	0	0	0	3	0	3	0	0	1	X	7
Scotland (Brewster)	0	0	0	0	1	0	0	1	0	X	2

==== Draw 7 ====
Tuesday, December 11, 16:00

Sheet A	1	2	3	4	5	6	7	8	9	10	Final
Denmark (Stjerne)	1	0	0	2	2	0	3	0	1	X	9
Sweden (Edin) 🔨	0	1	2	0	0	1	0	1	0	X	5

Sheet B	1	2	3	4	5	6	7	8	9	10	Final
Switzerland (Michel)	0	0	0	1	0	0	2	0	X	X	3
Czech Republic (Snítil) 🔨	0	1	1	0	2	1	0	3	X	X	8

Sheet C	1	2	3	4	5	6	7	8	9	10	Final
Norway (Ulsrud) 🔨	1	0	1	0	2	0	2	0	0	X	6
Germany (Lang)	0	0	0	2	0	1	0	0	1	X	4

Sheet D	1	2	3	4	5	6	7	8	9	10	Final
Scotland (Brewster)	0	3	0	3	0	1	2	0	0	X	9
France (Dufour) 🔨	2	0	1	0	1	0	0	2	1	X	7

Sheet E	1	2	3	4	5	6	7	8	9	10	Final
Russia (Drozdov)	0	1	0	2	2	0	0	2	0	X	7
Hungary (Nagy) 🔨	0	0	2	0	0	1	1	0	0	X	4

==== Draw 8 ====
Wednesday, December 12, 9:00

Sheet A	1	2	3	4	5	6	7	8	9	10	Final
Switzerland (Michel) 🔨	0	1	0	1	2	0	1	0	2	X	7
Germany (Lang)	0	0	1	0	0	2	0	2	0	X	5

Sheet B	1	2	3	4	5	6	7	8	9	10	Final
Hungary (Nagy)	0	3	0	0	1	0	0	1	1	X	6
Denmark (Stjerne) 🔨	2	0	1	2	0	0	3	0	0	X	8

Sheet C	1	2	3	4	5	6	7	8	9	10	Final
Sweden (Edin)	0	1	0	0	1	0	2	0	2	1	7
Scotland (Brewster) 🔨	0	0	2	0	0	3	0	1	0	0	6

Sheet D	1	2	3	4	5	6	7	8	9	10	Final
Czech Republic (Snítil) 🔨	0	0	1	1	0	0	3	0	0	2	7
Russia (Drozdov)	1	1	0	0	2	0	0	2	0	0	6

Sheet E	1	2	3	4	5	6	7	8	9	10	Final
Norway (Ulsrud)	1	0	1	1	0	1	0	0	0	1	5
France (Dufour) 🔨	0	1	0	0	1	0	2	1	1	0	6

==== Draw 9 ====
Wednesday, December 12, 19:00

Sheet A	1	2	3	4	5	6	7	8	9	10	Final
Hungary (Nagy) 🔨	0	1	0	0	1	0	1	0	1	1	5
Scotland (Brewster)	1	0	0	2	0	1	0	2	0	0	6

Sheet B	1	2	3	4	5	6	7	8	9	10	Final
Germany (Lang) 🔨	2	0	1	0	3	0	3	0	0	0	9
France (Dufour)	0	1	0	2	0	4	0	1	2	2	12

Sheet C	1	2	3	4	5	6	7	8	9	10	Final
Russia (Drozdov) 🔨	0	4	0	2	0	1	0	1	0	X	8
Switzerland (Michel)	0	0	2	0	1	0	1	0	2	X	6

Sheet D	1	2	3	4	5	6	7	8	9	10	Final
Norway (Ulsrud)	0	1	0	1	0	2	0	0	2	0	6
Sweden (Edin) 🔨	1	0	3	0	1	0	1	0	0	1	7

Sheet E	1	2	3	4	5	6	7	8	9	10	Final
Czech Republic (Snítil) 🔨	0	2	0	2	0	0	0	2	0	1	7
Denmark (Stjerne)	1	0	1	0	2	1	0	0	1	0	6

=== World Challenge Games ===
==== Challenge 1 ====
Friday, December 14, 20:00

Team	1	2	3	4	5	6	7	8	9	10	11	Final
France (Dufour)	0	2	0	3	0	1	1	1	0	2	1	11
Finland (Kauste) 🔨	1	0	2	0	5	0	0	0	2	0	0	10

==== Challenge 2 ====
Saturday, December 15, 9:30

Team	1	2	3	4	5	6	7	8	9	10	11	Final
France (Dufour) 🔨	0	1	0	2	0	0	1	0	2	0	0	6
Finland (Kauste)	0	0	3	0	1	0	0	2	0	0	2	8

==== Challenge 3 ====
Saturday, December 15, 14:00

Team	1	2	3	4	5	6	7	8	9	10	Final
France (Dufour) 🔨	1	0	2	0	0	0	0	1	1	0	5
Finland (Kauste)	0	1	0	2	1	1	1	0	0	0	6

Finland moves on to the 2013 World Men's Championship.

=== Playoffs ===
Page playoff system
1	Sweden	9
2	Czech Republic	3
3	Norway	6
4	Denmark	5

Semifinal
2	Czech Republic	4
3	Norway	6

Gold-medal game
1	Sweden	8
3	Norway	5

Bronze-medal game
2	Czech Republic	12
4	Denmark	4

==== 1 vs. 2 ====
Thursday, December 13, 20:00

Sheet C	1	2	3	4	5	6	7	8	9	10	Final
Sweden (Edin) 🔨	3	0	0	0	1	0	5	0	X	X	9
Czech Republic (Snítil)	0	0	0	1	0	1	0	1	X	X	3

Player percentages
Sweden		Czech Republic	
Viktor Kjäll	80%	Jindřich Kitzberger	77%
Fredrik Lindberg	91%	Jakub Bareš	76%
Sebastian Kraupp	71%	Martin Snítil	72%
Niklas Edin	93%	Jiří Snítil	68%
Total	84%	Total	73%

==== 3 vs. 4 ====
Thursday, December 13, 20:00

Sheet A	1	2	3	4	5	6	7	8	9	10	Final
Norway (Ulsrud) 🔨	1	0	1	0	0	1	0	1	0	2	6
Denmark (Stjerne)	0	1	0	0	1	0	2	0	1	0	5

Player percentages
Norway		Denmark	
Håvard Vad Petersson	91%	Troels Harry	66%
Christoffer Svae	83%	Mikkel Poulsen	72%
Torger Nergård	88%	Johnny Frederiksen	79%
Thomas Ulsrud	82%	Rasmus Stjerne	89%
Total	86%	Total	76%

==== Semifinal ====
Friday, December 14, 13:00

Sheet D	1	2	3	4	5	6	7	8	9	10	Final
Czech Republic (Snítil) 🔨	0	0	0	2	0	1	0	0	1	0	4
Norway (Ulsrud)	0	0	1	0	2	0	2	0	0	1	6

Player percentages
Czech Republic		Norway	
Jindřich Kitzberger	76%	Håvard Vad Petersson	83%
Jakub Bareš	70%	Christoffer Svae	78%
Martin Snítil	81%	Torger Nergård	76%
Jiří Snítil	65%	Thomas Ulsrud	82%
Total	73%	Total	80%

==== Bronze-medal game ====
Friday, December 14, 20:00

Team	1	2	3	4	5	6	7	8	9	10	Final
Czech Republic (Snítil) 🔨	0	2	1	0	3	0	3	3	X	X	12
Denmark (Stjerne)	1	0	0	1	0	2	0	0	X	X	4

Player percentages
Czech Republic		Denmark	
Jindřich Kitzberger	88%	Troels Harry	95%
Jakub Bareš	89%	Mikkel Poulsen	85%
Martin Snítil	80%	Johnny Frederiksen	86%
Jiří Snítil	82%	Rasmus Stjerne	73%
Total	85%	Total	85%

==== Gold-medal game ====
Saturday, December 15, 15:00

Sheet B	1	2	3	4	5	6	7	8	9	10	Final
Sweden (Edin) 🔨	1	0	0	0	2	2	0	2	0	1	8
Norway (Ulsrud)	0	0	2	0	0	0	2	0	1	0	5

Player percentages
Sweden		Norway	
Viktor Kjäll	78%	Håvard Vad Petersson	73%
Fredrik Lindberg	77%	Christoffer Svae	78%
Sebastian Kraupp	87%	Torger Nergård	76%
Niklas Edin	90%	Thomas Ulsrud	65%
Total	83%	Total	73%

2012 European Curling Championships – Men's winner
(Sweden)
Sweden
7th title

=== Player percentages ===
Round Robin only

Leads	%
(Sweden) Viktor Kjäll	82
(Switzerland) Simon Gempeler	79
(Scotland) Michael Goodfellow	78
(Denmark) Troels Harry	76
(Norway) Håvard Vad Petersson	76

Seconds	%
(Norway) Christoffer Svae	82
(Scotland) Scott Andrews	81
(Sweden) Fredrik Lindberg	79
(Czech Republic) Jakub Bares	79
(Russia) Alexey Tselousov	78

Thirds	%
(Sweden) Sebastian Kraupp	79
(Denmark) Johnny Frederiksen	78
(Norway) Torger Nergård	76
(Russia) Alexey Stukalskiy	75
(Czech Republic) Martin Snítil	75

Skips/Fourths	%
(Sweden) Niklas Edin	87
(Norway) Thomas Ulsrud	78
(Switzerland) Sven Michel	76
(Denmark) Rasmus Stjerne	75
(Czech Republic) Jiri Snítil	74

== Group B ==
=== Teams ===
The teams are listed as follows:

==== Red Group ====
England	Estonia	Finland	Italy
Skip: Alan MacDougall Third: Andrew Reed; Second: Andrew Woolston; Lead: Tom Jaeggi; Alternate: John Brown	Skip: Martin Lill Third: Ingar Mäesalu; Second: Harri Lill; Lead: Jan Anderson; Alternate: Siim Sildnik	Skip: Aku Kauste Third: Jani Sullanmaa; Second: Pauli Jäämies; Lead: Janne Pitko; Alternate: Leo Mäkelä	Skip: Fabio Sola Third: Julien Genre; Second: Simone Gonin; Lead: Graziano Iacovetti; Alternate: Simone Sola
Slovakia	Spain	Turkey	Wales
Skip: Pavol Pitoňák Third: Frantisek Pitoňák; Second: Tomas Pitoňák; Lead: Peter Pitoňák; Alternate: Rene Petko	Skip: Antonio de Mollinedo Third: Sergio Vez; Second: José Manuel Sangüesa; Lead: Ángel García; Alternate: Carlos Vega	Skip: Alican Karataş Third: Kadir Çakır; Second: Muhammet Çağrı Bayraktar; Lead: Muhammet Oǧuz Zengin; Alternate: Murat Sağır	Skip: Adrian Meikle Third: James Pougher; Second: Andrew Tanner; Lead: Richard Pougher; Alternate: Rhys Phillips

==== Blue Group ====
Austria	Belgium	Croatia	Ireland
Skip: Andreas Unterberger Third: Markus Forejtek; Second: Marcus Schmitt; Lead: Martin Egretzberger; Alternate: Felix Purzner	Skip: Marc Suter Third: Timothy Verrycken; Second: Walter Verbueken; Lead: Nils Beosier; Alternate: Peter Suter	Skip: Alen Cadez Third: Drazen Cutic; Second: Ognjen Golubic; Lead: Ivica Ivaci; Alternate: Zlatko Nikolic	Skip: Alan Mitchell Third: John Furey; Second: Dave Hibberd; Lead: Tom Roche; Alternate: Craig Whyte
Latvia	Lithuania	Netherlands	Poland
Skip: Ritvars Gulbis Third: Normunds Saršūns; Second: Aivars Avotiņš; Lead: Roberts Krusts	Skip: Tadas Vyskupaitis Third: Vytis Kulakauskas; Second: Vidas Sadauskas; Lead: Laurynas Telksnys; Alternate: Vygantas Zalieckas	Skip: Jaap van Dorp Third: Carlo Glasbergen; Second: Miles Maclure; Lead: Joey Bruinsma; Alternate: Floyd Koelewijn	Fourth: Jakub Głowania Third: Michael Żółtowski; Skip: Tomasz Zioło; Lead: Michał Kozioł; Alternate: Jakub Chęć

=== Round-robin standings ===
Final Round Robin Standings

Key
Teams to Playoffs
Countries to Tiebreakers
Countries relegated to 2013 Group C

Red Group	Skip	W	L
Finland	Aku Kauste	6	1
England	Alan MacDougall	5	2
Italy	Fabio Sola	5	2
Estonia	Martin Lill	4	3
Spain	Antonio de Mollinedo	3	4
Turkey	Alican Karataş	2	5
Slovakia	Pavol Pitoňák	2	5
Wales	Adrian Meikle	1	6

Blue Group	Skip	W	L
Latvia	Ritvars Gulbis	6	1
Netherlands	Jaap van Dorp	6	1
Croatia	Alen Cadez	4	3
Belgium	Marc Suter	4	3
Poland	Tomasz Zioło	3	4
Austria	Andreas Unterberger	2	5
Lithuania	Tadas Vyskupaitis	2	5
Ireland	Alan Mitchell	1	6

=== Round-robin results ===
==== Red Group ====
===== Draw 1 =====
Saturday, December 8, 8:00

Sheet A	1	2	3	4	5	6	7	8	9	10	Final
Italy (Sola)	0	0	4	0	2	0	1	0	0	X	7
England (MacDougall) 🔨	0	0	0	1	0	2	0	1	1	X	5

Sheet B	1	2	3	4	5	6	7	8	9	10	Final
Estonia (Lill)	1	0	0	1	0	0	1	0	0	X	3
Finland (Kauste) 🔨	0	1	0	0	1	1	0	3	0	X	6

Sheet C	1	2	3	4	5	6	7	8	9	10	Final
Spain (de Mollinedo)	0	0	3	4	0	0	1	0	1	0	9
Wales (Meikle) 🔨	1	1	0	0	3	2	0	2	0	1	10

Sheet D	1	2	3	4	5	6	7	8	9	10	Final
Slovakia (Pitoňák) 🔨	2	0	1	0	0	0	0	0	0	X	3
Turkey (Karataş)	0	1	0	1	2	1	1	1	1	X	8

===== Draw 2 =====
Saturday, December 8, 16:00

Sheet E	1	2	3	4	5	6	7	8	9	10	Final
Finland (Kauste) 🔨	2	0	0	0	1	2	1	0	2	X	8
Italy (Sola)	0	0	0	3	0	0	0	1	0	X	4

Sheet F	1	2	3	4	5	6	7	8	9	10	Final
Slovakia (Pitoňák) 🔨	1	2	0	1	0	1	3	1	X	X	9
Wales (Meikle)	0	0	1	0	1	0	0	0	X	X	2

===== Draw 3 =====
Sunday, December 9, 8:00

Sheet A	1	2	3	4	5	6	7	8	9	10	Final
Finland (Kauste)	0	0	0	1	2	0	0	2	0	2	7
Slovakia (Pitoňák) 🔨	1	1	1	0	0	1	1	0	0	0	5

Sheet B	1	2	3	4	5	6	7	8	9	10	Final
Wales (Meikle) 🔨	1	0	2	0	0	0	1	0	2	1	7
Italy (Sola)	0	2	0	1	1	2	0	2	0	0	8

Sheet C	1	2	3	4	5	6	7	8	9	10	Final
Turkey (Karataş) 🔨	0	1	1	0	0	1	0	1	0	0	4
England (MacDougall)	0	0	0	1	1	0	1	0	2	2	7

Sheet D	1	2	3	4	5	6	7	8	9	10	Final
Estonia (Lill)	0	1	2	0	6	0	0	3	X	X	12
Spain (de Mollinedo) 🔨	2	0	0	1	0	2	1	0	X	X	6

===== Draw 4 =====
Sunday, December 9, 16:00

Sheet E	1	2	3	4	5	6	7	8	9	10	11	Final
England (MacDougall) 🔨	1	0	1	0	0	1	1	0	2	0	1	7
Estonia (Lill)	0	1	0	3	0	0	0	1	0	1	0	6

Sheet F	1	2	3	4	5	6	7	8	9	10	11	Final
Spain (de Mollinedo)	0	0	1	0	2	0	0	1	0	3	1	8
Turkey (Karataş) 🔨	1	0	0	1	0	2	2	0	1	0	0	7

===== Draw 5 =====
Monday, December 10, 8:00

Sheet A	1	2	3	4	5	6	7	8	9	10	Final
Estonia (Lill)	1	0	3	1	0	0	0	0	1	0	6
Wales (Meikle) 🔨	0	1	0	0	0	0	1	1	0	1	4

Sheet B	1	2	3	4	5	6	7	8	9	10	Final
Slovakia (Pitoňák) 🔨	0	0	1	0	0	0	2	1	0	1	5
England (MacDougall)	1	0	0	2	1	1	0	0	2	0	7

Sheet C	1	2	3	4	5	6	7	8	9	10	Final
Italy (Sola)	0	1	0	2	0	0	3	0	1	X	7
Spain (de Mollinedo) 🔨	1	0	2	0	0	1	0	1	0	X	5

Sheet D	1	2	3	4	5	6	7	8	9	10	Final
Turkey (Karataş) 🔨	2	1	0	1	0	0	1	0	1	0	6
Finland (Kauste)	0	0	4	0	0	2	0	1	0	0	7

===== Draw 6 =====
Monday, December 10, 16:00

Sheet E	1	2	3	4	5	6	7	8	9	10	Final
Wales (Meikle) 🔨	0	1	0	0	1	0	1	0	0	X	3
Turkey (Karataş)	2	0	1	3	0	1	0	2	2	X	11

Sheet F	1	2	3	4	5	6	7	8	9	10	Final
Finland (Kauste)	0	0	0	2	0	1	0	0	1	X	4
England (MacDougall) 🔨	2	1	0	0	1	0	1	1	0	X	6

===== Draw 7 =====
Tuesday, December 11, 8:00

Sheet E	1	2	3	4	5	6	7	8	9	10	Final
Spain (de Mollinedo)	0	2	0	4	1	0	0	2	0	1	10
Slovakia (Pitoňák) 🔨	1	0	3	0	0	0	3	0	1	0	8

Sheet F	1	2	3	4	5	6	7	8	9	10	Final
Estonia (Lill)	1	0	2	1	0	1	0	2	0	X	7
Italy (Sola) 🔨	0	2	0	0	5	0	1	0	2	X	10

===== Draw 8 =====
Tuesday, December 11, 16:00

Sheet A	1	2	3	4	5	6	7	8	9	10	Final
England (MacDougall) 🔨	0	1	0	0	0	2	0	2	0	X	5
Spain (de Mollinedo)	1	0	1	0	0	0	4	0	3	X	9

Sheet B	1	2	3	4	5	6	7	8	9	10	Final
Turkey (Karataş) 🔨	0	0	1	0	0	0	0	0	0	X	1
Estonia (Lill)	0	1	0	1	2	0	2	1	2	X	9

Sheet C	1	2	3	4	5	6	7	8	9	10	Final
Wales (Meikle)	0	0	1	0	1	1	0	0	0	X	3
Finland (Kauste) 🔨	3	0	0	5	0	0	0	1	2	X	11

Sheet D	1	2	3	4	5	6	7	8	9	10	Final
Italy (Sola)	0	0	1	0	0	2	0	1	2	0	6
Slovakia (Pitoňák) 🔨	0	1	0	1	0	0	2	0	0	3	7

===== Draw 10 =====
Wednesday, December 12, 16:00

Sheet A	1	2	3	4	5	6	7	8	9	10	Final
Turkey (Karataş)	0	0	0	1	0	1	0	X	X	X	2
Italy (Sola)	0	3	1	0	3	0	3	X	X	X	10

Sheet B	1	2	3	4	5	6	7	8	9	10	Final
Finland (Kauste)	0	1	0	0	1	0	4	0	0	X	6
Spain (de Mollinedo)	0	0	0	1	0	1	0	2	0	X	4

Sheet C	1	2	3	4	5	6	7	8	9	10	11	Final
Slovakia (Pitoňák)	0	1	0	0	2	0	2	1	1	0	0	7
Estonia (Lill)	2	0	0	3	0	1	0	0	0	1	1	8

Sheet D	1	2	3	4	5	6	7	8	9	10	Final
England (MacDougall)	0	0	0	2	0	3	0	2	0	X	7
Wales (Meikle)	0	0	0	0	1	0	2	0	1	X	4

==== Blue Group ====
===== Draw 1 =====
Saturday, December 8, 8:00

Sheet E	1	2	3	4	5	6	7	8	9	10	Final
Ireland (Mitchell)	0	1	3	0	0	0	0	0	2	0	6
Latvia (Gulbis) 🔨	1	0	0	1	1	0	1	0	0	1	5

Sheet F	1	2	3	4	5	6	7	8	9	10	11	Final
Austria (Unterberger)	0	1	0	0	0	2	0	1	2	1	0	7
Poland (Zioło) 🔨	2	0	1	1	1	0	2	0	0	0	4	11

===== Draw 2 =====
Saturday, December 8, 16:00

Sheet A	1	2	3	4	5	6	7	8	9	10	11	Final
Poland (Zioło) 🔨	1	0	0	0	0	1	2	1	0	1	0	6
Belgium (Suter)	0	1	0	0	4	0	0	0	1	0	1	7

Sheet B	1	2	3	4	5	6	7	8	9	10	Final
Lithuania (Vyskupaitis) 🔨	1	0	0	1	0	0	1	0	1	0	4
Austria (Unterberger)	0	0	1	0	2	1	0	1	0	2	7

Sheet C	1	2	3	4	5	6	7	8	9	10	Final
Netherlands (van Dorp)	0	1	0	0	0	3	0	0	2	0	6
Latvia (Gulbis) 🔨	2	0	0	1	1	0	1	2	0	1	8

Sheet D	1	2	3	4	5	6	7	8	9	10	Final
Ireland (Mitchell) 🔨	1	2	0	0	0	0	0	0	0	X	3
Croatia (Cadez)	0	0	1	1	1	0	1	1	2	X	7

===== Draw 3 =====
Sunday, December 9, 8:00

Sheet E	1	2	3	4	5	6	7	8	9	10	Final
Belgium (Suter) 🔨	2	2	1	2	0	0	1	0	0	2	10
Lithuania (Vyskupaitis)	0	0	0	0	1	4	0	2	0	0	7

Sheet F	1	2	3	4	5	6	7	8	9	10	Final
Croatia (Cadez)	0	1	0	0	0	1	0	0	0	X	2
Netherlands (van Dorp) 🔨	0	0	2	1	1	0	3	1	2	X	10

===== Draw 4 =====
Sunday, December 9, 16:00

Sheet A	1	2	3	4	5	6	7	8	9	10	Final
Ireland (Mitchell)	0	0	0	0	0	1	0	2	1	X	4
Austria (Unterberger) 🔨	0	2	1	1	1	0	0	1	0	X	6

Sheet B	1	2	3	4	5	6	7	8	9	10	Final
Poland (Zioło)	0	0	1	0	1	0	0	0	1	0	3
Latvia (Gulbis) 🔨	0	0	0	0	0	1	1	1	0	1	4

Sheet C	1	2	3	4	5	6	7	8	9	10	Final
Croatia (Cadez) 🔨	0	2	0	1	0	2	1	0	1	2	9
Lithuania (Vyskupaitis)	4	0	1	0	1	0	0	1	0	0	7

Sheet D	1	2	3	4	5	6	7	8	9	10	Final
Belgium (Suter)	0	0	0	2	0	1	0	X	X	X	3
Netherlands (van Dorp) 🔨	0	1	3	0	3	0	3	X	X	X	10

===== Draw 5 =====
Monday, December 10, 8:00

Sheet E	1	2	3	4	5	6	7	8	9	10	Final
Croatia (Cadez) 🔨	1	0	0	2	0	0	0	0	0	X	3
Poland (Zioło)	0	0	1	0	1	1	1	1	3	X	8

Sheet F	1	2	3	4	5	6	7	8	9	10	Final
Lithuania (Vyskupaitis) 🔨	0	1	1	1	0	0	2	3	1	X	9
Ireland (Mitchell)	0	0	0	0	2	1	0	0	0	X	3

===== Draw 6 =====
Monday, December 10, 16:00

Sheet A	1	2	3	4	5	6	7	8	9	10	Final
Latvia (Gulbis) 🔨	0	0	2	0	0	0	1	0	1	2	6
Croatia (Cadez)	0	1	0	1	0	0	0	1	0	0	3

Sheet B	1	2	3	4	5	6	7	8	9	10	Final
Netherlands (van Dorp) 🔨	2	0	1	1	0	2	0	1	1	X	8
Ireland (Mitchell)	0	1	0	0	1	0	1	0	0	X	3

Sheet C	1	2	3	4	5	6	7	8	9	10	Final
Belgium (Suter)	0	0	2	0	0	2	1	0	0	1	6
Austria (Unterberger) 🔨	0	0	0	0	1	0	0	1	2	0	4

Sheet D	1	2	3	4	5	6	7	8	9	10	Final
Poland (Zioło)	0	0	0	0	1	0	2	0	X	X	3
Lithuania (Vyskupaitis) 🔨	1	1	2	4	0	1	0	2	X	X	11

===== Draw 7 =====
Tuesday, December 11, 8:00

Sheet A	1	2	3	4	5	6	7	8	9	10	Final
Lithuania (Vyskupaitis)	1	1	0	0	1	0	2	0	0	X	5
Netherlands (van Dorp) 🔨	0	0	3	1	0	1	0	1	1	X	7

Sheet B	1	2	3	4	5	6	7	8	9	10	Final
Croatia (Cadez)	0	1	0	0	1	1	0	3	0	X	6
Belgium (Suter) 🔨	0	0	1	1	0	0	1	0	1	X	4

Sheet C	1	2	3	4	5	6	7	8	9	10	Final
Poland (Zioło) 🔨	3	0	1	0	2	0	1	3	X	X	10
Ireland (Mitchell)	0	1	0	2	0	1	0	0	X	X	4

Sheet D	1	2	3	4	5	6	7	8	9	10	Final
Latvia (Gulbis)	0	1	1	2	3	1	0	0	0	1	9
Austria (Unterberger) 🔨	1	0	0	0	0	0	4	1	2	0	8

===== Draw 8 =====
Tuesday, December 11, 16:00

Sheet E	1	2	3	4	5	6	7	8	9	10	Final
Austria (Unterberger)	0	0	0	1	0	1	0	0	1	X	3
Netherlands (van Dorp) 🔨	0	2	1	0	1	0	1	1	0	X	6

Sheet F	1	2	3	4	5	6	7	8	9	10	Final
Latvia (Gulbis)	0	0	1	2	0	1	0	1	0	0	5
Belgium (Suter) 🔨	0	1	0	0	0	0	1	0	2	0	4

===== Draw 9 =====
Wednesday, December 12, 8:00

Sheet A	1	2	3	4	5	6	7	8	9	10	Final
Belgium (Suter)	0	0	4	0	3	0	2	0	1	0	10
Ireland (Mitchell) 🔨	0	1	0	2	0	1	0	2	0	1	7

Sheet B	1	2	3	4	5	6	7	8	9	10	Final
Latvia (Gulbis) 🔨	2	0	0	2	4	1	0	1	X	X	10
Lithuania (Vyskupaitis)	0	1	1	0	0	0	1	0	X	X	3

Sheet C	1	2	3	4	5	6	7	8	9	10	Final
Austria (Unterberger) 🔨	2	0	0	1	0	1	1	1	0	0	6
Croatia (Cadez)	0	1	4	0	0	0	0	0	0	3	8

Sheet D	1	2	3	4	5	6	7	8	9	10	Final
Netherlands (van Dorp) 🔨	2	1	0	4	0	1	0	2	X	X	10
Poland (Zioło)	0	0	4	0	0	0	2	0	X	X	6

=== Tiebreaker ===
Wednesday, December 12, 20:00

Team	1	2	3	4	5	6	7	8	9	10	Final
England (MacDougall) 🔨	0	0	2	1	1	0	2	2	0	X	8
Italy (Sola)	1	0	0	0	0	2	0	0	1	X	4

=== Playoffs ===
Page playoff system
R1	Finland	5
B1	Latvia	6
R2	England	4
B2	Netherlands	7

Semifinal
R1	Finland	7
B2	Netherlands	4

Gold-medal game
B1	Latvia	4
R1	Finland	7

Bronze-medal game
B2	Netherlands	10
R2	England	5

==== R1 vs. B1 ====
Thursday, December 13, 20:00

Team	1	2	3	4	5	6	7	8	9	10	Final
Finland (Kauste) 🔨	0	0	1	0	1	0	2	0	1	0	5
Latvia (Gulbis)	1	1	0	1	0	1	0	1	0	1	6

==== R2 vs. B2 ====
Thursday, December 13, 20:00

Team	1	2	3	4	5	6	7	8	9	10	Final
England (MacDougall)	0	0	1	0	1	0	0	2	0	X	4
Netherlands (van Dorp) 🔨	0	1	0	2	0	3	1	0	0	X	7

==== Semifinal ====
Friday, December 14, 8:00

Team	1	2	3	4	5	6	7	8	9	10	Final
Finland (Kauste)	0	1	0	1	1	1	0	2	1	X	7
Netherlands (van Dorp) 🔨	2	0	1	0	0	0	1	0	0	X	4

==== Bronze-medal game ====
Friday, December 14, 13:00

Team	1	2	3	4	5	6	7	8	9	10	Final
Netherlands (van Dorp)	0	2	0	3	0	0	3	2	X	X	10
England (MacDougall) 🔨	2	0	1	0	2	0	0	0	X	X	5

==== Gold-medal game ====
Friday, December 14, 13:00

Team	1	2	3	4	5	6	7	8	9	10	Final
Latvia (Gulbis)	0	0	2	0	1	0	0	0	1	X	4
Finland (Kauste) 🔨	3	0	0	2	0	0	1	1	0	X	7

== Group C ==
=== Teams ===
The teams are listed as follows:

Belarus	Croatia	Iceland	Luxembourg
Skip: Dmitry Kirillov Third: Pavel Petrov; Second: Dzmitry Yarko; Lead: Andrey Aulasenka; Alternate: George Kirillov	Skip: Alan Cadez Third: Drazen Cutic; Second: Robert Mikulandric; Lead: Ognjen Golubic; Alternate: Alberto Skendrovic	Skip: Jens Gislason Third: Jon Ingi Sigurdsson; Second: Olafur Numason; Lead: Sveinn Steingrimsson; Alternate: Ragnar Ragnarsson	Skip: Jörg Moeser Third: Yves Sieradski; Second: Claude Schweitzer; Lead: Marc Promme; Alternate: Alex Benoy
Romania	Slovenia	Turkey	
Skip: Bogdan Taut Third: Bogdan Colceriu; Second: Valentin Gheorghe Anghelinei; Lead: Stefan Vladimir Bodea-Tatulea; Alternate: Allen Coliban	Skip: Zvone Sever Third: Matjaz Prezelj; Second: Domen Zalokar; Lead: Mitja Donosa; Alternate: Gregor Verbinc	Skip: Muhammet Oǧuz Zengin Third: Alican Karataş; Second: Kadir Çakir; Lead: Muhammet Çagrı Bayraktar; Alternate: Yusuf Ziya Bayraktutan	

=== Round-robin standings ===
Final Round Robin Standings

Key
Teams to Playoffs
Teams to Tiebreaker

Country	Skip	W	L
Croatia	Alan Cadez	6	0
Turkey	Muhammet Oǧuz Zengin	5	1
Belarus	Dmitry Kirillov	4	2
Slovenia	Zvone Sever	2	4
Iceland	Jens Gislason	2	4
Romania	Bogdan Taut	1	5
Luxembourg	Jörg Moeser	1	5

=== Round-robin results ===
==== Draw 1 ====
Friday, October 5, 17:30

Sheet C	1	2	3	4	5	6	7	8	Final
Turkey (Zengin)	0	0	3	0	1	0	1	0	5
Croatia (Cadez) 🔨	2	0	0	1	0	2	0	1	6

Sheet D	1	2	3	4	5	6	7	8	Final
Belarus (Kirillov) 🔨	4	4	2	1	0	2	X	X	13
Slovenia (Sever)	0	0	0	0	1	0	X	X	1

==== Draw 2 ====
Saturday, October 6, 9:00

Sheet C	1	2	3	4	5	6	7	8	Final
Romania (Taut)	1	0	1	1	3	0	0	0	6
Luxembourg (Moeser) 🔨	0	3	0	0	0	1	1	0	5

Sheet E	1	2	3	4	5	6	7	8	Final
Iceland (Gislason)	0	0	0	0	0	1	X	X	1
Belarus (Kirillov) 🔨	3	3	4	1	1	0	X	X	12

==== Draw 3 ====
Saturday, October 6, 13:00

Sheet B	1	2	3	4	5	6	7	8	Final
Romania (Taut) 🔨	0	1	0	0	0	0	2	X	3
Croatia (Cadez)	1	0	1	3	1	1	0	X	7

Sheet C	1	2	3	4	5	6	7	8	Final
Iceland (Gislason) 🔨	1	0	1	0	3	0	0	X	5
Turkey (Zengin)	0	2	0	2	0	3	2	X	9

Sheet E	1	2	3	4	5	6	7	8	Final
Slovenia (Sever) 🔨	1	2	0	3	2	0	1	X	9
Luxembourg (Moeser)	0	0	2	0	0	1	0	X	3

==== Draw 4 ====
Sunday, October 7, 9:00

Sheet A	1	2	3	4	5	6	7	8	9	Final
Luxembourg (Moeser) 🔨	1	0	0	0	0	1	5	0	2	9
Iceland (Gislason)	0	2	2	1	1	0	0	1	0	7

Sheet B	1	2	3	4	5	6	7	8	Final
Croatia (Cadez)	2	2	1	0	3	1	X	X	9
Slovenia (Sever) 🔨	0	0	0	1	0	0	X	X	1

Sheet E	1	2	3	4	5	6	7	8	Final
Romania (Taut)	0	0	1	0	1	0	0	X	2
Turkey (Zengin) 🔨	1	1	0	4	0	1	1	X	8

==== Draw 5 ====
Sunday, October 7, 14:00

Sheet A	1	2	3	4	5	6	7	8	Final
Turkey (Zengin)	3	0	2	1	0	0	5	X	11
Slovenia (Sever) 🔨	0	3	0	0	1	1	0	X	5

Sheet C	1	2	3	4	5	6	7	8	Final
Luxembourg (Moeser)	0	1	0	0	0	3	0	0	4
Belarus (Kirillov) 🔨	2	0	0	1	1	0	0	1	5

Sheet D	1	2	3	4	5	6	7	8	Final
Croatia (Cadez)	0	2	0	2	0	1	1	X	6
Iceland (Gislason) 🔨	1	0	1	0	1	0	0	X	3

==== Draw 6 ====
Sunday, October 7, 19:00

Sheet A	1	2	3	4	5	6	7	8	Final
Belarus (Kirillov) 🔨	3	3	1	0	3	0	3	X	13
Romania (Taut)	0	0	0	1	0	1	0	X	2

==== Draw 7 ====
Monday, October 8, 9:00

Sheet B	1	2	3	4	5	6	7	8	Final
Slovenia (Sever) 🔨	1	0	0	1	0	4	0	X	6
Iceland (Gislason)	0	3	1	0	5	0	3	X	12

Sheet D	1	2	3	4	5	6	7	8	Final
Turkey (Zengin)	0	3	3	0	0	2	X	X	8
Luxembourg (Moeser) 🔨	1	0	0	1	1	0	X	X	3

==== Draw 8 ====
Monday, October 8, 14:00

Sheet A	1	2	3	4	5	6	7	8	9	Final
Croatia (Cadez)	0	1	0	0	1	0	1	2	1	6
Belarus (Kirillov) 🔨	1	0	2	1	0	1	0	0	0	5

Sheet C	1	2	3	4	5	6	7	8	Final
Slovenia (Sever) 🔨	3	0	2	0	1	1	0	1	8
Romania (Taut)	0	3	0	2	0	0	2	0	7

==== Draw 9 ====
Monday, October 8, 19:00

Sheet B	1	2	3	4	5	6	7	8	Final
Belarus (Kirillov) 🔨	1	0	1	0	0	0	X	X	2
Turkey (Zengin)	0	4	0	0	1	3	X	X	8

Sheet D	1	2	3	4	5	6	7	8	Final
Iceland (Gislason) 🔨	0	0	1	0	1	0	3	2	7
Romania (Taut)	1	1	0	1	0	2	0	0	5

Sheet E	1	2	3	4	5	6	7	8	Final
Luxembourg (Moeser)	0	1	0	0	0	0	X	X	1
Croatia (Cadez) 🔨	1	0	0	3	2	2	X	X	8

=== Tiebreaker ===
Wednesday, October 9, 12:00

Sheet E	1	2	3	4	5	6	7	8	Final
Slovenia (Sever)	1	0	2	0	0	0	2	2	7
Iceland (Gislason) 🔨	0	2	0	1	2	1	0	0	6

Slovenia advances to playoffs.

=== Playoffs ===
In the playoffs, the first and second seeds, Croatia and Turkey, played a semifinal game to determine the first team to advance to the Group B competitions. The loser of this game, along with the winners of the semifinal game played by the third and fourth seeds, Belarus and Slovakia, advance to the second place game, which determines the second team to advance to the Group B competitions.

Second Place Game
1	Croatia	9
4	Slovenia	2

Semifinals
1	Croatia	3
2	Turkey	4
3	Belarus	5
4	Slovenia	6

==== Semifinals ====
Tuesday, October 9, 18:00

Sheet C	1	2	3	4	5	6	7	8	Final
Croatia (Cadez) 🔨	0	0	0	1	0	1	1	0	3
Turkey (Zengin)	0	0	1	0	1	0	0	2	4

Turkey advances to the Group B competitions.
Croatia moves to Second Place Game.

Sheet A	1	2	3	4	5	6	7	8	Final
Belarus (Kirillov) 🔨	0	1	0	1	0	1	0	2	5
Slovenia (Sever)	2	0	2	0	1	0	1	0	6

Slovenia advances to Second Place Game.

==== Second Place Game ====
Wednesday, October 10, 10:00

Sheet B	1	2	3	4	5	6	7	8	Final
Croatia (Cadez) 🔨	1	0	3	2	2	0	1	X	9
Slovenia (Sever)	0	1	0	0	0	1	0	X	2

Croatia advances to Group B competitions.
