= Turkish Curling Federation =

Sports governing body for curling in Turkey

- Sport: Curling
- Jurisdiction: National
- Abbreviation: TCF
- Founded: 2016; 9 years ago
- Affiliation: World Curling Federation
- Affiliation date: 2009; 16 years ago
- Headquarters: Çankata, Ankara, Turkey
- Location: Kızılay Mah. Gazi Mustafa Kemal Blv. Fevzi Çakmak 1. Sok. Tibaş Vakıfhan 24/15-16
- President: Kenan Şebin

Official website
- www.curling.gov.tr
- (Turkey)

Turkish Curling Federation (Turkish: Türkiye Curling Federasyonu) is the governing body for the sport of curling in Turkey. Established as an independent federation in 2016, it is headquartered in Çankaya, Ankara.

== History ==
Initially, curling sport activities in Turkey were governed by the Turkish Ice Skating Federation (TBPF). On 20 January 2015, the Turkish Curling Federation (TCF) was formed independently, separating from the TBPF with the approval of the Ministry of Youth and Sports. The first president of the federation, Kenan Şebin, was elected at the general assembly held on 21 January 2016. The president took office with the approval of the Ministry on 26 February 2016. The federation's Board of Directors was formed in accordance with the regulations on sport federations, and it started its duty with the approval of the Ministry on 5 May 2016. The federation's main staus and regulations were published in the Official Gazette, and entered into force on 8 October 2017.

== Venues ==
Venıes in Turkey dedicated to curling are:

- Milli Piyango Curling Arena, Yakutiye, Erzurum
- Samsun İlkadım Ice Sports Hall, Ilkadım, Samsun
- Tekirdağ Olympic Ice Skating Hall, Süleymanpaşa, Tekirdağ
- Trabzon Curling Hall, Ortahisar, Trabzon

== Clubs ==
There are a total of 127 curling clubs in Turkey registered by the federation. Erzurum is the most important city for curling sport having 43 clubs.

== Leagues ==
The Turkish curling league system consists of the Super League, the First League and the Second League, all for men's and women's. As of the 2024-25 season, nine teams conpete each in the men's and women's Super League, and ten teams each in the men's and women's in the First League. There are a total of 24 clubs in the top two leagues, mostly based in Erzurum.

== Competitions ==
=== Domestic ===
The Federation organizes following competitions each year:

The Turkish Curling Federation Cup (Turkish: Türkiye Curling Federasyon Kupası).

The Turkish Seniors Curling Tournament (Turkish: Türkiye Senyörler Curling Turnuvası).

The Turkish Intrauniversity Curling Championship (Turkish: Türkiye Üniversitelerarası Curling Şampiyonası) for male and female students.

The Turkish Schools Curling Championships (Turkish: Okul Sporları Gençler Curling Türkiye Şampiyonası) is held with 12 teams in four cities.

=== International ===
National men^s and women's junior and men's and women's teams compete at international competitions of world and European level.

== Floor curling ==
Turkish High School Floor Curling Tournament (Turkish: Floor Curling Gençler Türkiye Birinciliği) is held for different age classes of high school students in the iceless variation of curling sport. A tournament for school teachers is also held.

== President ==
- Prof. Dr. Kenan Şebin (2016− )

== See also ==
- Curling in Turkey
- Turkey men's national curling team
- Turkey men's national under-21 curling team
- Turkey women's national curling team
- Turkey women's national under-21 curling team
- Turkey national wheelchair curling team.
