= 2012 European Curling Championships =

- Host city: Karlstad, Sweden
- Arena: Löfbergs Lila Arena; Karlstad Curling Club
- Dates: December 7–15
- Men's winner: Sweden
- Skip: Niklas Edin
- Third: Sebastian Kraupp
- Second: Fredrik Lindberg
- Lead: Viktor Kjäll
- Alternate: Oskar Eriksson
- Finalist: Norway (Thomas Ulsrud)
- Women's winner: Russia
- Skip: Anna Sidorova
- Third: Liudmila Privivkova
- Second: Margarita Fomina
- Lead: Ekaterina Galkina
- Alternate: Nkeiruka Ezekh
- Finalist: Scotland (Eve Muirhead)

The 2012 European Curling Championships was held from December 7 to 15 at the Löfbergs Lila Arena and the Karlstad Curling Club in Karlstad, Sweden. The Group A competitions was held at the Löfbergs Lila Arena, while the Group B competitions was held at the Karlstad Curling Club. The 2012 European Curling Championships marked the fourth time that Sweden hosted the European Curling Championships. The Group C competitions were held from October 5 to 10 in Erzurum, Turkey.

Russia's Anna Sidorova, last year's runner-up, won the gold medal in the women's tournament after defeating last year's champions Scotland, skipped by Eve Muirhead, in the final in an extra end. Sweden's Margaretha Sigfridsson won the bronze medal over Denmark's Lene Nielsen. In the men's tournament, Sweden's Niklas Edin won their second title by defeating two-time consecutive champion Thomas Ulsrud of Norway. Jiří Snítil of the Czech Republic improved on his record at the European Championships by winning the bronze medal over last year's bronze medalists Denmark, skipped by Rasmus Stjerne.

A total of eight men's and seven women's teams qualified for the 2013 World Curling Championships. On the men's side, Sweden, the Czech Republic, Norway, Denmark, Russia, Switzerland, Scotland, and Finland (who defeated France in the World Challenge Games), qualified for the 2013 Ford World Men's Curling Championship. On the women's side, Russia, Scotland, Sweden, Denmark, Switzerland, Italy and Germany qualified for the 2013 World Women's Curling Championship and joined hosts Latvia in competition.

== Men ==
=== Group A ===
The Group A competitions was contested in Karlstad. Ten teams, including the teams advancing from last year's Group B competitions (Hungary and Russia), competed in a round robin. The top four teams in the round robin moved on to the playoffs. In the page playoffs, Sweden defeated the Czech Republic, and Norway edged past Denmark. Norway then secured a close win over the Czech Republic, and the Czechs moved to the bronze medal game, where they defeated Denmark in a rematch of last year's bronze medal game. Sweden then defeated Norway in the gold medal game with a final score of 8–5 after hitting to win the game in the tenth end.

==== Round-robin standings ====
Final round-robin standings

Key
Countries to Playoffs
Countries to Tiebreakers
Countries relegated to 2013 Group B

Country	Skip	W	L
Sweden	Niklas Edin	8	1
Czech Republic	Jiří Snítil	7	2
Norway	Thomas Ulsrud	6	3
Denmark	Rasmus Stjerne	6	3
Russia	Andrey Drozdov	5	4
Switzerland	Sven Michel	5	4
Scotland	Tom Brewster	4	5
France	Thomas Dufour	3	6
Germany	Andy Lang	1	8
Hungary	György Nagy	0	9

==== Playoffs ====
Page playoff system
1	Sweden	9
2	Czech Republic	3
3	Norway	6
4	Denmark	5

Semifinal
2	Czech Republic	4
3	Norway	6

Gold-medal game
1	Sweden	8
3	Norway	5

Bronze-medal game
2	Czech Republic	12
4	Denmark	4

===== Bronze-medal game =====
Friday, December 14, 20:00

Team	1	2	3	4	5	6	7	8	9	10	Final
Czech Republic (Snítil) 🔨	0	2	1	0	3	0	3	3	X	X	12
Denmark (Stjerne)	1	0	0	1	0	2	0	0	X	X	4

Player percentages
Czech Republic		Denmark	
Jindřich Kitzberger	88%	Troels Harry	95%
Jakub Bareš	89%	Mikkel Poulsen	85%
Martin Snítil	80%	Johnny Frederiksen	86%
Jiří Snítil	82%	Rasmus Stjerne	73%
Total	85%	Total	85%

===== Gold-medal game =====
Saturday, December 15, 15:00

Sheet B	1	2	3	4	5	6	7	8	9	10	Final
Sweden (Edin) 🔨	1	0	0	0	2	2	0	2	0	1	8
Norway (Ulsrud)	0	0	2	0	0	0	2	0	1	0	5

Player percentages
Sweden		Norway	
Viktor Kjäll	78%	Håvard Vad Petersson	73%
Fredrik Lindberg	77%	Christoffer Svae	78%
Sebastian Kraupp	87%	Torger Nergård	76%
Niklas Edin	90%	Thomas Ulsrud	65%
Total	83%	Total	73%

=== Group B ===
The Group B competitions were contested in Karlstad. Sixteen teams, including the teams advancing from the same year's Group C competitions (Turkey and Croatia), competed in a two group round robin. The top four teams in the round robin moved on to the playoffs. Latvia, the leader of the Blue Group, defeated Finland, the leader of the Red Group, and advanced to the final, while the Netherlands, the second-ranked team in the Blue Group, defeated England, the runner-up of the Red Group, and advanced to the semifinal. Finland defeated the Netherlands in the semifinal and moved on to the gold medal game, where they defeated Latvia to win the Group B competitions. The Netherlands defeated England in the bronze medal game.

Finland and Latvia advanced to the 2013 Group A competitions, and Finland played France in the World Challenge Games, where Finland defeated France in a best-of-three series to win the final berth at the 2013 World Men's Curling Championship. Wales and Ireland were relegated to the 2013 Group C competitions.

==== Round-robin standings ====
Final round-robin standings

Key
Teams to Playoffs
Countries to Tiebreakers
Countries relegated to 2013 Group C

Red Group	Skip	W	L
Finland	Aku Kauste	6	1
England	Alan MacDougall	5	2
Italy	Fabio Sola	5	2
Estonia	Martin Lill	4	3
Spain	Antonio de Mollinedo	3	4
Turkey	Alican Karataş	2	5
Slovakia	Pavol Pitoňák	2	5
Wales	Adrian Meikle	1	6

Blue Group	Skip	W	L
Latvia	Ritvars Gulbis	6	1
Netherlands	Jaap van Dorp	6	1
Croatia	Alen Cadez	4	3
Belgium	Marc Suter	4	3
Poland	Tomasz Zioło	3	4
Austria	Andreas Unterberger	2	5
Lithuania	Tadas Vyskupaitis	2	5
Ireland	Alan Mitchell	1	6

==== Playoffs ====
Page playoff system
R1	Finland	5
B1	Latvia	6
R2	England	4
B2	Netherlands	7

Semifinal
R1	Finland	7
B2	Netherlands	4

Gold-medal game
B1	Latvia	4
R1	Finland	7

Bronze-medal game
B2	Netherlands	10
R2	England	5

===== Bronze-medal game =====
Friday, December 14, 13:00

Team	1	2	3	4	5	6	7	8	9	10	Final
Netherlands (van Dorp)	0	2	0	3	0	0	3	2	X	X	10
England (MacDougall) 🔨	2	0	1	0	2	0	0	0	X	X	5

===== Gold-medal game =====
Friday, December 14, 13:00

Team	1	2	3	4	5	6	7	8	9	10	Final
Latvia (Gulbis)	0	0	2	0	1	0	0	0	1	X	4
Finland (Kauste) 🔨	3	0	0	2	0	0	1	1	0	X	7

=== Group C ===
The Group C competitions were contested in Erzurum, where the 2012 European Mixed Curling Championship was also held. Seven men's teams competed for two berths to the Group B competitions, which were held in Karlstad. The teams played in a round robin, and at its conclusion, the top four teams advanced to the playoffs, which were held in a format similar to that of the World Wheelchair Curling Championship qualification events. Turkey advanced to the Group B competitions after winning the first semifinal game, and Croatia advanced to the Group B competition after winning the second place game.

==== Round-robin standings ====
Final round-robin standings

Key
Teams to Playoffs
Teams to Tiebreaker

Country	Skip	W	L
Croatia	Alen Cadez	6	0
Turkey	Muhammet Oǧuz Zengin	5	1
Belarus	Dmitry Kirillov	4	2
Slovenia	Zvone Sever	2	4
Iceland	Jens Gislason	2	4
Romania	Bogdan Taut	1	5
Luxembourg	Jörg Moeser	1	5

==== Playoffs ====
Second Place Game
1	Croatia	9
4	Slovenia	2

Semifinals
1	Croatia	3
2	Turkey	4
3	Belarus	5
4	Slovenia	6

== Women ==
=== Group A ===
The Group A competitions were contested in Karlstad. Ten teams, including the teams advancing from last year's Group B competitions (Finland and Hungary), competed in a round robin. The top four teams in the round robin moved on to the playoffs. In the page playoffs, Scotland defeated Sweden, and Russia edged Denmark. Russia then stole the win against Sweden in the semifinal in an extra end, and advanced to the final, where they won with a score of 6–5 in an extra end over Scotland. Sweden defeated Denmark in the bronze medal game with a score of 9–3.

==== Round-robin standings ====
Final round-robin standings

Key
Countries to Playoffs
Countries to Tiebreakers
Countries relegated to 2013 Group B

Country	Skip	W	L
Sweden	Margaretha Sigfridsson	7	2
Scotland	Eve Muirhead	7	2
Russia	Anna Sidorova	7	2
Denmark	Lene Nielsen	6	3
Switzerland	Mirjam Ott	6	3
Italy	Diana Gaspari	4	5
Germany	Andrea Schöpp	3	6
Czech Republic	Linda Klímová	3	6
Finland	Anne Malmi	1	8
Hungary	Ildikó Szekeres	1	8

==== Playoffs ====
Page playoff system
1	Sweden	3
2	Scotland	9
3	Russia	7
4	Denmark	6

Semifinal
1	Sweden	6
3	Russia	8

Final
2	Scotland	5
3	Russia	6

Bronze-medal game
1	Sweden	9
4	Denmark	3

===== Bronze-medal game =====
Friday, December 14, 20:00

Team	1	2	3	4	5	6	7	8	9	10	Final
Sweden (Sigfridsson) 🔨	2	0	2	0	3	0	1	1	X	X	9
Denmark (Nielsen)	0	1	0	1	0	1	0	0	X	X	3

Player percentages
Sweden		Denmark	
Margaretha Sigfridsson	78%	Maria Poulsen	84%
Maria Wennerström	86%	Jeanne Ellegaard	80%
Christina Bertrup	93%	Helle Simonsen	76%
Maria Prytz	93%	Lene Nielsen	63%
Total	87%	Total	76%

===== Gold-medal game =====
Saturday, December 15, 10:00

Sheet B	1	2	3	4	5	6	7	8	9	10	11	Final
Scotland (Muirhead) 🔨	0	0	2	0	0	2	0	0	0	1	0	5
Russia (Sidorova)	1	0	0	1	1	0	1	0	1	0	1	6

Player percentages
Scotland		Russia	
Claire Hamilton	82%	Ekaterina Galkina	81%
Vicki Adams	78%	Margarita Fomina	86%
Anna Sloan	79%	Liudmila Privivkova	81%
Eve Muirhead	85%	Anna Sidorova	77%
Total	81%	Total	81%

=== Group B ===
The Group B competitions were contested in Karlstad. Ten teams, including the teams advancing from the same year's Group C competitions (Belarus and Turkey), competed in a round robin. The top four teams in the round robin moved on to the playoffs. In the page playoffs, undefeated Norway defeated Estonia, and Latvia defeated Austria. Latvia swept Estonia in the semifinal in nine ends, sending Estonia to play Austria for the bronze medal. Latvia defeated Norway to win the Group B competitions with a score of 7–3, and Austria recorded a win over Estonia in the bronze medal game.

Latvia and Norway advanced to the 2013 Group A competitions, and Belarus and Slovakia were relegated to the 2013 Group C competitions.

==== Round-robin results ====
Final round-robin standings

Key
Teams to Playoffs
Countries relegated to 2013 Group C

Country	Skip	W	L
Norway	Linn Githmark	9	0
Estonia	Maile Mölder	7	2
Latvia	Iveta Staša-Šaršūne	6	3
Austria	Karina Toth	5	4
Turkey	Elif Kızılkaya	4	5
Poland	Elzbieta Ran	4	5
England	Fiona Hawker	3	6
Spain	Irantzu García	3	6
Belarus	Ekaterina Kirillova	2	7
Slovakia	Daniela Matulová	2	7

==== Playoffs ====
Page playoff system
1	Norway	10
2	Estonia	5
3	Latvia	9
4	Austria	4

Semifinal
2	Estonia	3
3	Latvia	9

Gold-medal game
1	Norway	4
3	Latvia	7
Bronze-medal game
2	Estonia	5
4	Austria	8

===== Bronze-medal game =====
Friday, December 14, 13:00

Team	1	2	3	4	5	6	7	8	9	10	Final
Estonia (Mölder) 🔨	0	0	0	2	1	0	1	0	1	X	5
Austria (Toth)	2	1	2	0	0	2	0	1	0	X	8

===== Gold-medal game =====
Friday, December 14, 13:00

Team	1	2	3	4	5	6	7	8	9	10	Final
Norway (Githmark) 🔨	1	0	1	1	1	0	0	0	0	X	4
Latvia (Staša-Šaršūne)	0	1	0	0	0	0	1	4	1	X	7

=== Group C ===
The Group C competitions were contested in Erzurum, where the 2012 European Mixed Curling Championship was also held. Six women's teams competed for two berths to the Group B competitions, which were held in Karlstad. The teams played in a round robin, and at its conclusion, the top four teams advanced to the playoffs, which were held in a format similar to that of the World Wheelchair Curling Championship qualification events. Belarus advanced to the Group B competitions after winning the first semifinal game, and Turkey advanced to the Group B competition after winning the second place game.

==== Round-robin standings ====
Final round-robin standings

Key
Teams to Playoffs

Country	Skip	W	L
Turkey	Öznur Polat	5	0
Belarus	Ekaterina Kirillova	3	2
Netherlands	Marianne Neeleman	3	2
Croatia	Melani Lusic	2	3
Romania	Daiana Raluca Colceriu	1	4
Slovenia	Valentina Jurincic	1	4

==== Playoffs ====
Second Place Game
1	Turkey	8
3	Netherlands	4

Semifinals
1	Turkey	6
2	Belarus	10
3	Netherlands	11
4	Croatia	3
