= Şenol Güneş Sports Complex =

Association football stadium in Trabzon, Turkey

Papara Park
- Akyazı Arena
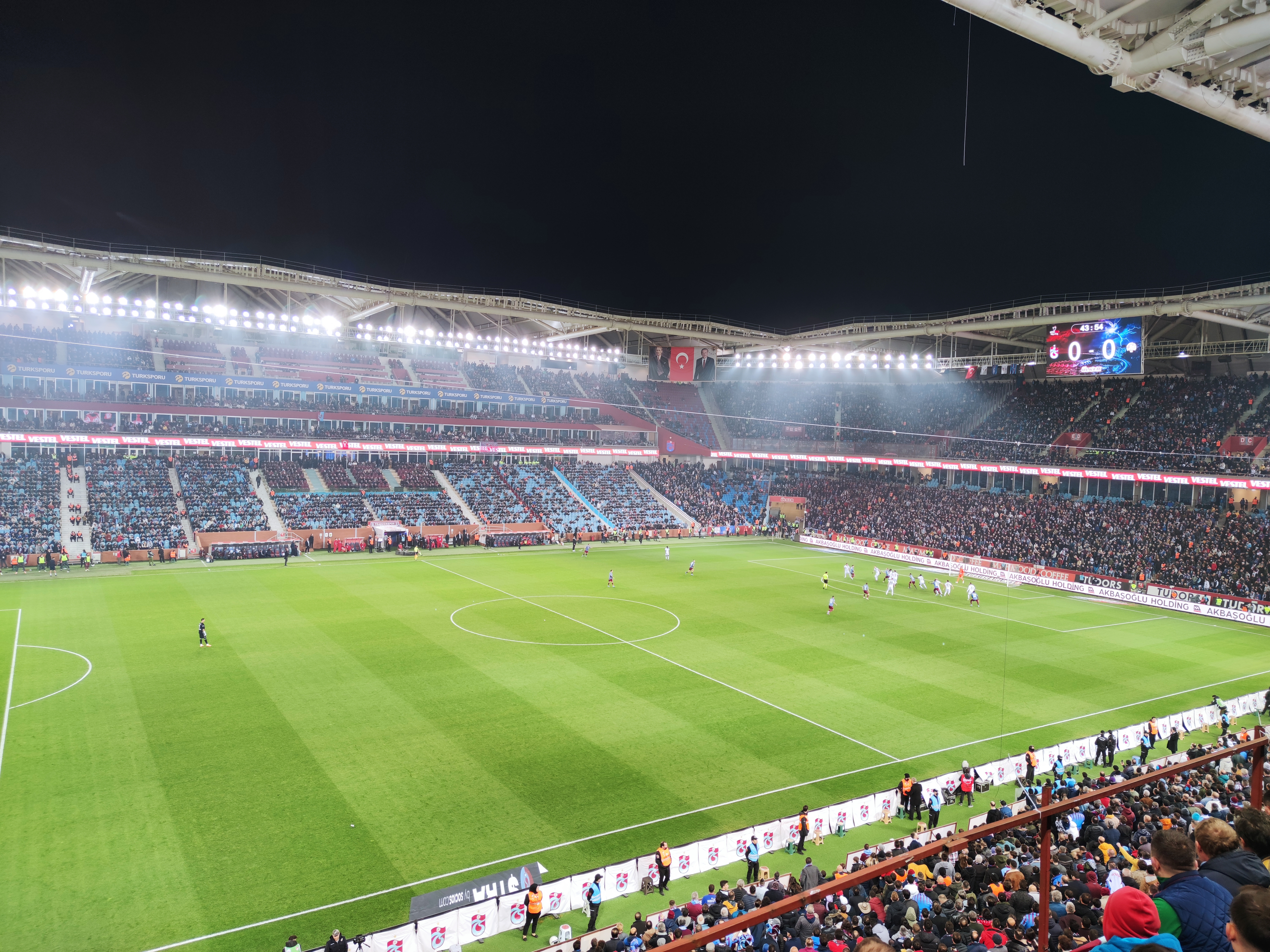

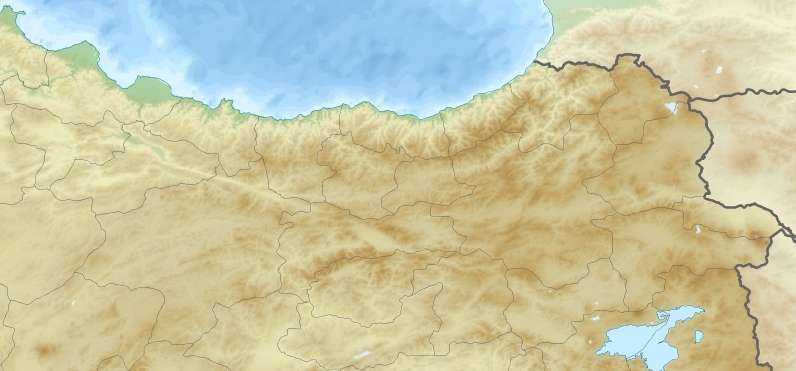
- Location in Northeastern Turkey Location in Turkey
- Full name: Şenol Güneş Spor Kompleksi Papara Park
- Former names: Medical Park Arena (2016–2017); Medical Park Stadyumu (2017–2022)
- Location: Trabzon, Turkey
- Coordinates: 40°59′57″N 39°38′45″E
- Owner: Ministry of Youth and Sports (Turkey)
- Operator: Trabzonspor
- Capacity: 41,131
- Executive suites: 122
- Surface: Hybrid grass
- Record attendance: 40,368 (Trabzonspor U19–Inter Milan Primavera, UEFA Youth League, 1 April 2025)

Construction
- Groundbreaking: 24 November 2013
- Built: 2013–2016
- Opened: 18 December 2016
- Cost: $35 million
- Architect: ASP Stuttgart

Tenants
- Trabzonspor (2016–present); Turkey national football team (selected matches)

The Papara Park, officially known as the Şenol Güneş Spor Complex Papara Park (Turkish: Şenol Güneş Spor Kompleksi), is a stadium located in Trabzon, Turkey. It opened to public on 18 December 2016 and has a capacity of 41,131 spectators.

It is the new home of Trabzonspor of the Süper Lig, replacing Hüseyin Avni Aker Stadium. It is named after the Turkish football manager and former goalkeeper of Trabzonspor and Turkey national football team, as well as former coach of the national team, Şenol Güneş.

In 2017, interactive monitors were installed in the stadium's press seats, which provides match streaming, player information, etc.

There are plans to connect the stadium to Trabzon's City Center with the new Trabzon Tram per a 2022 announcement by the region's mayor.

== See also ==
- Trabzon Curling Hall.
