= Alican Karataş =

Turkish curler

- Curler
- Born: 9 September 1991 (age 35)

Team
- Curling club: Sital Spor, Ankara
- Skip: Alican Karataş
- Third: Melik Senol
- Second: Ugurcan Karagoz
- Lead: Muhammet Oguz Zengin
- Alternate: Kadir Cakir

Curling career
- European Championship: 5 (2012, 2013, 2014, 2015, 2016)

Alican Karataş (born 9 September 1991) is a Turkish curler, and member of the Turkey men's national curling team.

He began curling at Sital Spor in Ankara in 2009. Karataş curled with the Turkish national team, which captured the gold medal at the 5th Debrecen Bonspiel. He skipped at the European Curling Championships-Group B in Karlstad, Sweden following his team's promotion from Group C.

Karakaş took part at the 2013 European Junior Curling Challenge#Men in Prague, Czech Republic, which was the qualifying tournament for the 2013 World Junior Curling Championships. He skipped a 4-2 win in the round robin of Group A, tying with the Italian team. Losing in the tiebreaker game, he failed to reach the semifinals. He ranked 4th of 12 competitors.

== Achievements ==
Year	Competition	Host	Position	Rank	GP	W	L
2012	5th Debrecen Bonspiel Cup	(Hungary) Debrecen		1st place, gold medalist(s)			
2012	European Curling Championships-Group C	(Turkey) Erzurum	Third	1st place, gold medalist(s)	7	6	1
2012	European Curling Championships-Group B	(Sweden) Karlstad	Skip	22nd	7	2	5
2013	European Junior Curling Challenge-Group A	(Czech Republic) Prague	Skip	4th	7	4	3
Total					21	12	9
