= Trabzon Tram =

Mainline route in turkey

Trabzon Tramway

Overview
- Owner: Trabzon Metropolitan Municipality
- Locale: Trabzon
- Transit type: Light Rail
- Number of lines: 1 under construction
- Number of stations: 18
- Daily ridership: 57,000 (estimated)

Operation
- Operation will start: 2028
- Operator: Trabzon Metropolitan Municipality

Technical
- System length: 7.8 km (4.8 mi)
- Average speed: 40

The Trabzon Tramway is a planned light rail transit system located in Trabzon, Turkey. When completed, the Trabzon Tramway will have 18 stations and run east–west from the city center to the western suburbs of Trabzon and Şenol Güneş Sports Complex the home of Trabzonspor. A final route and financing for the project was announced by Trabzon Mayor Murat Zorluoğlu on February 10, 2022. The line will run 7.8 km (4.8 mi) and is expected to carry 57,000 passengers daily when operational.

== History ==
In March 2019, Recep Tayyip Erdoğan announced that a light rail system will be built in Trabzon in an effort to relief traffic congestion and reflective of Trabzon's position as one of the largest cities in Turkey. Following the announcement 3 years of planning and data collection were undertaken by the Trabzon Metropolitan Municipality and the Ministry of Transport and Infrastructure (Turkey). Data collection, route designation and design were completed in early 2022 as announced by the Mayor of Trabzon. The project is expected to cost 140 million Euros.

A date of construction start and estimated construction completion has not been announced. Additional phases of the Tram have been conceptualized but not fully planned. Trains are expected to run at an average speed of 40 km/h (25 mph).

== Stations ==
Phase One of the project includes 18 stations. All stations will offer safe and clearly identified at-grade pedestrian crossings. The light rail system will run at-grade and at times above-grade. Phase One is slated to be 7.8 km (4.8 mi) long.

Name	Station	District
1	Trabzon Meydan	Sehir Merkez
2	Trabzon Sehir Muzesi	Sehir Merkez
3	Mufti Cami	Sehir Merkez
4	Zagnos	Sehir Merkez
5	Ortahislar Belediyesi	Sehir Merkez
6	Trabzon Buyuksehir Belediyesi	Sehir Merkez
7	Trabzon Lisesi	Sehir Merkez
8	Numune Hastanesi	Sehir Merkez
9	Hasan Saka Cadde	Sehir Merkez
10	Yenimahalle	Sehir Merkez
11	Ayasofya	Sehir Merkez
12	Tarim Kredi Kooperatifi Bolge	Sehir Merkez
13	Orman Bolge Mudurlugu	Sehir Merkez
14	Besirli Tenis Kompleksi	Sehir Merkez
15	Cevre Sehircilik	Sehir Merkez
16	Besirli	Sehir Merkez
17	Stadyum	Sehir Merkez
18	Sehir Hastanesi	Sehir Merkez
