= Trabzon Curling Hall =

Ice sports venue in Trabzon, Turkey

- Interactive map of Trabzon Curling Hall
- Location: Ortahisar, Trabzon, Turkey
- Coordinates: 40.99900°N 39.64620°E

Construction
- Opened: 2017; 9 years ago

Trabzon Curling Hall (Turkish: Trabzon Curling Salonu) is an indoor ice rink for curling located in Ortahisar district of Trabzon, Turkey.

The curling hall was established under the stadium at the Şenol Güneş Sports Complex in Ortahisar district of Trabzon in 2017. The curling venue has two lanes in Olympic size.

The venue is home to the men's and women's curling teams of the Trabzon TEİAŞ S.K., which compete in the Turkish Curling First League.

In February 2025, the venue hosted the Turkish Seniors Curling Tournament.
