= Muhammet Oǧuz Zengin =

- Curler

Team
- Curling club: Atatürk University, Erzurum
- Skip: Alican Karataş
- Third: Melik Senol
- Second: Ugurcan Karagoz
- Lead: Muhammet Oğuz Zengin
- Alternate: Kadir Cakir

Curling career
- European Championship: 4 (2012, 2013, 2014, 2015)
- Other appearances: Winter Universiade (2011)

Muhammet Oğuz Zengin, or simply Oğuz Zengin, is a Turkish curler, and member of the Turkey men's national curling team. He is student at Atatürk University in Erzurum and plays in the university team.

At the 2011 European Curling Championships-Group C competition held in Tårnby Denmark, he was the lead in the team, which won the bronze medal. He skipped his national team to the gold medal at the 2012 European Curling Championships-Group C in Erzurum, Turkey helping his team's promotion to Group B.

== Achievements ==
Year	Competition	Host	Position	Rank	GP	W	L
2011	Winter Universiade	(Turkey) Erzurum	Lead	9th	9	1	8
2011	European Mixed Curling Championship	(Denmark) Tårnby	Alternate	23rd	0	0	0
2011	European Curling Championships-Group C	(Denmark) Tårnby	Lead	3rd place, bronze medalist(s)	9	6	3
2012	European Mixed Curling Championship	(Turkey) Erzurum	Alternate	23rd	0	0	0
2012	European Curling Championships-Group C	(Turkey) Erzurum	Skip	1st place, gold medalist(s)	7	6	1
2012	European Curling Championships-Group B	(Sweden) Karlstad	Lead	22nd	7	2	5
Total					32	15	17
