= Pavol Pitoňák =

Slovak curler and coach

- Curler ♂
- Born: 26 February 1972 (age 54)

Curling career
- Member Association: Slovakia
- World Mixed Doubles Championship: 2 (2012, 2013)
- European Championship: 10 (2004, 2005, 2007, 2008, 2009, 2010, 2011, 2012, 2018, 2019)
- Other appearances: European Mixed Championship: 4 (2007, 2011, 2012, 2013)
Medal record
Curling

Pavol Pitoňák (born 26 February 1972) is a Slovak male curler and curling coach.

As a coach of Slovak wheelchair curling team he participated in 2018 Winter Paralympics.

== Teams ==
=== Men's ===
Season	Skip	Third	Second	Lead	Alternate	Coach	Events
2004–05	Pavel Kocián	Radomir Vozar	Pavol Pitoňák	Juraj Kapolka	Stefan Turna	Gerry "Soupy" Campbell	ECC 2004 (21st)
2005–06	Pavol Pitoňák	Pavel Kocian	Radomir Vozar	Juraj Kapolka	Stefan Turna	Gerry "Soupy" Campbell	ECC 2005 (23rd)
2007–08	Pavol Pitoňák	František Pitoňák	Tomáš Pitoňák	Peter Pitoňák	Milan Kalis	Gerry "Soupy" Campbell	ECC 2007 (17th)
2008–09	Pavol Pitoňák	František Pitoňák	Tomáš Pitoňák	Peter Pitoňák	Stefan Turna	Gerry "Soupy" Campbell	ECC 2008 (21st)
2009–10	Pavol Pitoňák	František Pitoňák	Tomáš Pitoňák	Peter Pitoňák	Stefan Turna	Gerry "Soupy" Campbell	ECC 2009 (28th)
2010–11	Pavol Pitoňák	František Pitoňák	Tomáš Pitoňák	Peter Pitoňák		Gerry "Soupy" Campbell	ECC 2010 (14th)
2011–12	Pavol Pitoňák	František Pitoňák	Tomáš Pitoňák	Peter Pitoňák	Milan Kajan	Gerry "Soupy" Campbell	ECC 2011 (24th)
2012–13	Pavol Pitoňák	František Pitoňák	Tomáš Pitoňák	Peter Pitoňák	Rene Petko	Gerry "Soupy" Campbell	ECC 2012 (23rd)
2014–15	Pavol Pitoňák	František Pitoňák	Tomáš Pitoňák	Peter Pitoňák	Juraj Gallo		ECC 2014 (28th)
2016–17	David Misun	Juraj Gallo	Jakub Polak	Pavol Pitoňák	Patrik Kapralik		
2017–18	David Misun	Juraj Gallo	Jakub Polak	Pavol Pitoňák	Patrik Kapralik		
2018–19	Pavol Pitoňák	František Pitoňák	Tomáš Pitoňák	Peter Pitoňák			ECC 2018 (22nd)
2019–20	Pavol Pitoňák	František Pitoňák	Tomáš Pitoňák	Peter Pitoňák			ECC 2019 (25th)

=== Mixed ===
Season	Skip	Third	Second	Lead	Alternate	Coach	Events
2007–08	Pavel Kocián	Barbora Vojtusova	Pavol Pitoňák	Zuzana Axamitová	Ronald Krcmar	Vladimira Pitoňáková	EMxCC 2007 (12th)
2011–12	Pavel Kocián	Daniela Matulová	Pavol Pitoňák	Silvia Sýkorová			EMxCC 2011 (16th)
2012–13	Pavol Pitoňák	Gabriela Kajanová	František Pitoňák	Petra Pitoňáková			EMxCC 2012 (9th)
2013–14	Pavol Pitoňák	Daniela Matulová	František Pitoňák	Zuzana Axamitová		Vladimira Pitoňáková	EMxCC 2013 (8th)

=== Mixed doubles ===
Season	Male	Female	Coach	Events
2011–12	Pavol Pitoňák	Silvia Sýkorová	Daniel Sýkora	WMDCC 2012 (17th)
2012–13	Pavol Pitoňák	Gabriela Kajanová	Vladimira Pitoňáková	WMDCC 2013 (19th)

== Record as a coach of national teams ==
Year	Tournament, event	National team	Place
2008	2008 World Wheelchair Curling Qualification	Slovakia (wheelchair)	10
2017	2017 World Junior B Curling Championships	Slovakia (junior women)	5
2018	2018 Winter Paralympics	Slovakia (wheelchair)	9

== Personal life ==
He is from big family of curlers: three of his brothers (František, Tomáš and Peter) are Pavol's teammates, they played together many times on European championships and other international curling tournaments; one more his brother Dušan played wheelchair curling (Pavol and František coaches their wheelchair team on Worlds and Winter Paralympics); other family members also are curlers or coaches.
