= Troels Harry =

Danish curler

- Curler
- Born: 25 December 1990 (age 35); Hvidovre, Denmark

Team
- Curling club: Hvidovre CC, Hvidovre, DEN
- Skip: Rasmus Stjerne
- Third: Johnny Frederiksen
- Second: Oliver Dupont
- Lead: Troels Harry
- Alternate: Mikkel Poulsen

Curling career
- World Championship: 4 (2012, 2013, 2014, 2016)
- European Championship: 7 (2010, 2011, 2012, 2013, 2014, 2015, 2016)
- Olympic: 1 (2014)
Medal record
Men's curling
Representing Denmark
World Curling Championships
Silver medal – second place	2016 Basel
European Championships
Silver medal – second place	2010 Champéry
Bronze medal – third place	2011 Moscow
World Junior Championships
Gold medal – first place	2009 Vancouver

Troels Harry (born 25 December 1990 in Hvidovre) is a Danish curler. He is a former world junior champion and four-time Danish men's champion (2012, 2013, 2014, 2016).

== Career ==
Harry has represented Denmark in four World Junior Championships. He played lead for Rasmus Stjerne in 2007 and 2008, finishing fourth and seventh, respectively. In 2009, Denmark, with Harry as lead under Stjerne, made the playoffs. They were defeated by Canada in the page 1 vs. 2 game, but rebounded with a win over the United States in the semifinal and defeated Canada in the final to win the gold medal. Harry played at the lead position under Mikkel Krause at the 2010 World Junior Curling Championships, but finished in eight place.

In international play, Harry played lead for Stjerne at the 2010 European Curling Championships, and made the playoffs, where they defeated Germany and Switzerland to play Norway in the gold medal game. Norway's Thomas Ulsrud won a close game over Stjerne, leaving him the silver medal. The next year, at the 2011 European Curling Championships, the team again made the playoffs, but lost in an extra end in the page 3 vs. 4 game to the Czech Republic, relegating him to the bronze medal game. However, Denmark defeated the Czech Republic in the bronze medal game.

Harry represented Denmark at the 2012 World Men's Curling Championship in Basel, where Denmark finished outside of the playoffs. Harry represented Denmark again at the 2013 Ford World Men's Curling Championship and the 2016 World Men's Curling Championship.
