= İfayet Şafak Çalıkuşu =

Turkish curler

- Curler
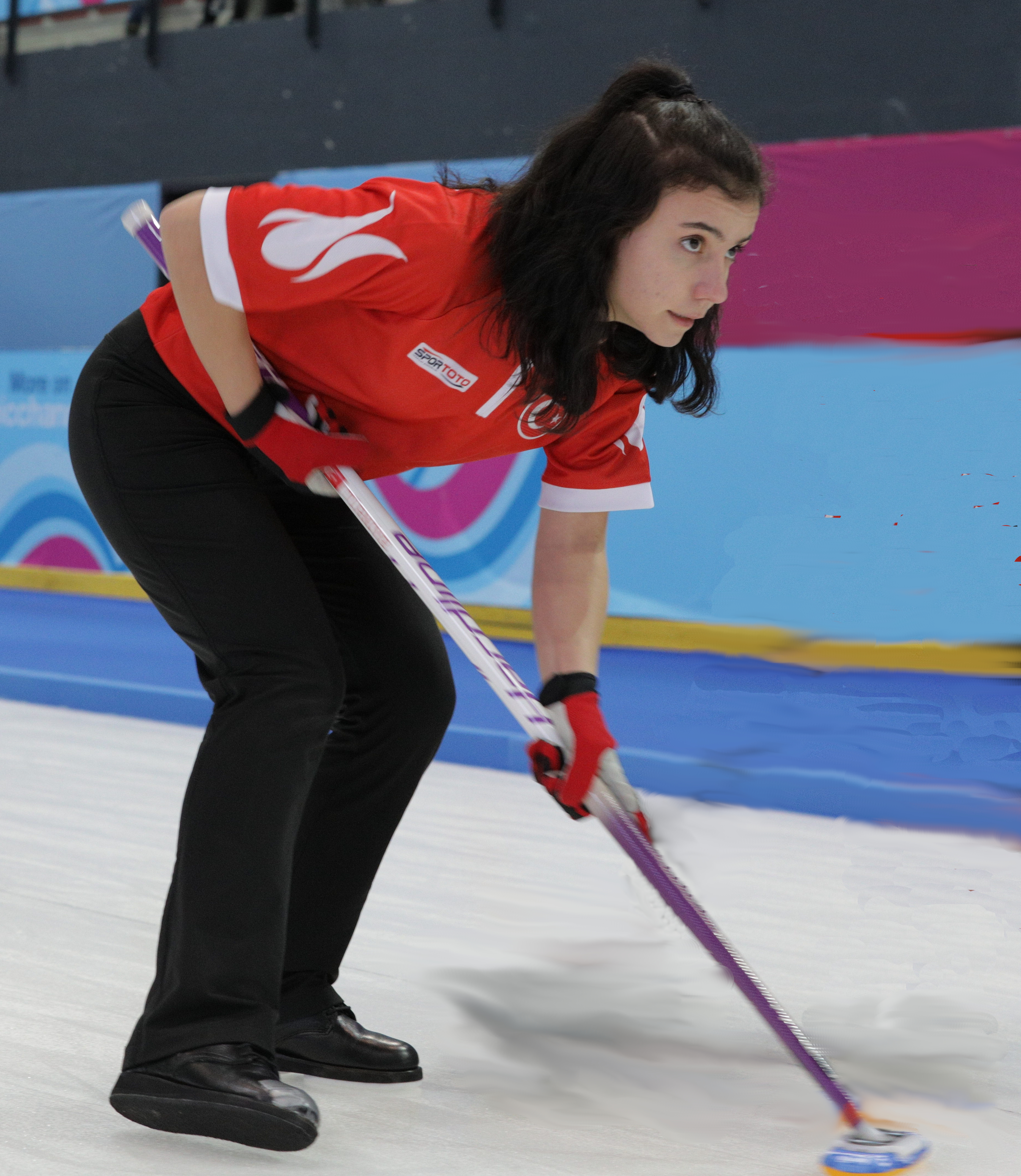
- Çalıkuşu at the 2020 Winter Youth Olympics
- Born: August 4, 2002 (age 24); Erzurum, Turkey

Team
- Curling club: Milli Piyango CA, Erzurum
- Skip: Dilşat Yıldız
- Third: Öznur Polat
- Second: İclal Karaman
- Lead: Berfin Şengül
- Alternate: İfayet Şafak Çalıkuşu

Curling career
- Member Association: Turkey
- World Championship: 3 (2023, 2024, 2025)
- European Championship: 4 (2022, 2023, 2024, 2025)

İfayet Şafak Çalıkuşu (born August 4, 2002) is a Turkish curler from Erzurum, Turkey. She is currently the alternate on the Turkey women's national curling team skipped by Dilşat Yıldız.

== Career ==
In 2019, Çalıkuşu appeared in her first international event, skipping the Turkish team at the 2019 European Youth Olympic Winter Festival. Throwing third rocks on the team with fourth Beytullah Özkan, second Kadir Polat and lead Nisanur Kaya, she led Turkey to a 1–5 round robin record. Their sole win came in their final game where they defeated Austria 8–2. The same year, Çalıkuşu served as the alternate on the Turkey junior rink led by Mihriban Polat at the 2019 World Junior-B Curling Championships. There, the team just missed the playoffs with a 2–3 record.

Çalıkuşu played lead on the Turkish team that represented the nation at the 2020 Winter Youth Olympics in Champéry, Switzerland. Her team, with skip Selahattin Eser, fourth Kadir Polat and third Berfin Şengül finished 2–3 through the round robin, not enough to advance to the playoff round. She then competed with Park Sang-woo of Korea in the mixed doubles event. The pair lost their opening match in the round of forty-eight, eliminating them from contention.

After not competing internationally for over two years, Çalıkuşu was added to the Turkish national women's team for the 2022–23 season, replacing Ayşe Gözütok who stepped back after the 2022 World Women's Curling Championship. Playing second on the team skipped by Dilşat Yıldız, they found major success at the 2022 European Curling Championships. After three consecutive losses, the team won five straight games which included wins over higher seeded Germany, Denmark and Norway. In their final game, they lost a narrow 8–7 match to Sweden's Anna Hasselborg, finishing in sixth place and just outside of the playoffs. As they had finished in the top eight, however, they qualified for the 2023 World Women's Curling Championship, the second consecutive championship for the team and first for Çalıkuşu. There, the team of Yıldız, Öznur Polat, Mihriban Polat, Berfin Şengül and Çalıkuşu had a slow start, going 1–4 in their first five games. They then picked up momentum, winning four of their next five games, which included wins against Japan, Korea, Germany and Denmark. Needing to win their next two games to qualify for the playoffs, they fell 10–4 to Canada, eliminating them from contention. They were able to beat Scotland in their final round robin game to finish in eighth place with an even 6–6 record.

In preparation for the 2023 European Curling Championships, the Turkish women's team played in two tour events. After a fourth-place finish at the Sundbyberg Open, the team advanced to the final of the WCT Tallinn Ladies Challenger where they lost to Evelīna Barone. At the Europeans in Aberdeen, the team did not replicate their success from 2022, instead finishing tied for last in the group with Czechia and Germany at 2–7. However, because their two victories came against these two teams, they finished eighth overall and earned qualification into the 2024 World Women's Curling Championship for a third straight year. In the new year, the team competed in the 2024 Cortina Curling Cup where they defeated higher ranked teams such as Stefania Constantini, Marianne Rørvik and Xenia Schwaller en route to claiming Turkey's first women's World Curling Tour event title. At the World Championship, the team had a slow start and never recovered, finishing with a 3–9 record and tenth place overall. Notability, the team gave Canada's Rachel Homan one of their toughest games of the event. With Turkey leading by one in the tenth, Homan needed a precise runback for the victory, which she made.

== Personal life ==
Çalıkuşu is currently a student athlete.

== Teams ==
Season	Skip	Third	Second	Lead	Alternate
2019–20	Mihriban Polat	Kader Macit	Hilal Nevruz	Selenay Diler	İfayet Şafak Çalıkuşu
2022–23	Dilşat Yıldız	Öznur Polat	İfayet Şafak Çalıkuşu	Mihriban Polat	Berfin Şengül
2023–24	Dilşat Yıldız	Öznur Polat	İfayet Şafak Çalıkuşu	Berfin Şengül	Mihriban Polat
2023–24	Dilşat Yıldız	Öznur Polat	İfayet Şafak Çalıkuşu	Berfin Şengül	İclal Karaman
2023–24	Berfin Şengül (Fourth)	İfayet Şafak Çalıkuşu	İclal Karaman	İlknur Ürüşan (Skip)	Melisa Cömert
2024–25	Dilşat Yıldız	Öznur Polat	İfayet Şafak Çalıkuşu	Berfin Şengül	İclal Karaman
2025–26	Dilşat Yıldız	Öznur Polat	İclal Karaman	Berfin Şengül	İfayet Şafak Çalıkuşu
