= 2012 European Curling Championships – Women's tournament =

2012 European Curling Championships Women's tournament
- Host city: Karlstad, Sweden
- Arena: Löfbergs Lila Arena; Karlstad Curling Club
- Dates: December 7–15
- Winner: Russia
- Skip: Anna Sidorova
- Third: Liudmila Privivkova
- Second: Margarita Fomina
- Lead: Ekaterina Galkina
- Alternate: Nkeiruka Ezekh
- Finalist: Scotland (Eve Muirhead)

The women's tournament of the 2012 European Curling Championships was held at the Löfbergs Lila Arena and the Karlstad Curling Club in Karlstad, Sweden from December 7 to 15. The winners of the Group C tournament in Erzurum, Turkey moved on to the Group B tournament. The top seven women's teams at the 2012 European Curling Championships, Russia, Scotland, Sweden, Denmark, Switzerland, Italy and Germany, will represent their respective nations at the 2013 World Women's Curling Championship in Riga, Latvia.

In the Group A competitions, Sweden, Scotland, and Russia finished at the top of the round robin standings with two losses apiece. Denmark defeated Switzerland in a tiebreaker to advance to the playoffs. The page playoffs saw defending champions Scotland rout Sweden and Russia edge past Denmark. Sweden dropped to the bronze medal game after a surprising loss in the semifinal to Russia, who stole the 8–6 win in an extra end. Hometown favorite Sweden, skipped by Margaretha Sigfridsson, recovered by defeating Denmark's Lene Nielsen with a score of 9–3 to win the bronze medal. Russia then played Scotland in the final, and stole one point in the first and fifth ends to hold the lead at the break, and stole one more point in the second half of the game. Scotland's Eve Muirhead managed to hang on with two deuces, and tied the game in the tenth end. Russia's Anna Sidorova secured a second European championship for Russia with a hit in the extra end, winning with a score of 6–5.

The Group C competitions in Erzurum saw Belarus and Turkey advancing to the Group B competitions, where they and two other teams played in a round robin tournament. Undefeated Norway dominated the round robin, and defeated Estonia in the page playoffs to advance to the final. Latvia moved up to the semifinal with a win over Austria in the page playoffs, and defeated Estonia in the semifinal to advance to the final. Austria defeated Estonia in the bronze medal game with a score of 8–5, while Norway's winning streak was broken with a 7–4 loss to Latvia. Latvia and Norway advance to the Group A competitions, replacing Finland and Hungary, and Belarus and Slovakia were relegated to the Group C competitions. Latvia were scheduled to play Germany in the World Challenge Games, but qualified to the world championships automatically as hosts.

== Group A ==
=== Teams ===
The teams are listed as follows:

Czech Republic	Denmark	Finland	Germany	Hungary
Skip: Linda Klímová; Third: Kamila Mošová; Second: Anna Kubešková; Lead: Kateřina Urbanová; Alternate: Tereza Plišková	Skip: Lene Nielsen; Third: Helle Simonsen; Second: Jeanne Ellegaard; Lead: Maria Poulsen; Alternate: Ane Hansen	Skip: Anne Malmi; Third: Oona Kauste; Second: Heidi Hossi; Lead: Marjo Hippi; Alternate: Tiina Suuripää	Skip: Andrea Schöpp; Third: Imogen Oona Lehmann; Second: Corinna Scholz; Lead: Stella Heiß; Alternate: Nicole Muskatewitz	Skip: Ildikó Szekeres; Third: Alexandra Béres; Second: Ágnes Patonai; Lead: Boglárka Ádám; Alternate: Blanka Páthy-Denscő
Italy	Russia	Scotland	Sweden	Switzerland
Skip: Diana Gaspari; Third: Giorgia Apollonio; Second: Chiara Olivieri; Lead: Claudia Alvera; Alternate: Maria Gaspari	Skip: Anna Sidorova; Third: Liudmila Privivkova; Second: Margarita Fomina; Lead: Ekaterina Galkina; Alternate: Nkeiruka Ezekh	Skip: Eve Muirhead; Third: Anna Sloan; Second: Vicki Adams; Lead: Claire Hamilton; Alternate: Sarah Reid	Fourth: Maria Prytz; Third: Christina Bertrup; Second: Maria Wennerström; Skip: Margaretha Sigfridsson; Alternate: Agnes Knochenhauer	Skip: Mirjam Ott; Third: Carmen Schäfer; Second: Carmen Küng; Lead: Janine Greiner; Alternate: Alina Pätz

=== Round-robin standings ===
Final round-robin standings

Key
Countries to Playoffs
Countries to Tiebreakers
Countries relegated to 2013 Group B

Country	Skip	W	L	PF	PA	Ends Won	Ends Lost	Blank Ends	Stolen Ends	Shot Pct.
Sweden	Margaretha Sigfridsson	7	2	72	38	37	29	7	11	82%
Scotland	Eve Muirhead	7	2	64	38	37	25	12	12	78%
Russia	Anna Sidorova	7	2	71	47	38	28	10	14	79%
Denmark	Lene Nielsen	6	3	55	48	39	30	12	12	77%
Switzerland	Mirjam Ott	6	3	63	46	39	34	8	11	77%
Italy	Diana Gaspari	4	5	55	65	36	36	8	9	72%
Germany	Andrea Schöpp	3	6	51	57	32	36	11	8	72%
Czech Republic	Linda Klímová	3	6	50	64	32	36	14	2	70%
Finland	Anne Malmi	1	8	36	81	25	43	10	2	69%
Hungary	Ildikó Szekeres	1	8	37	70	25	43	12	5	66%

=== Round-robin results ===
==== Draw 1 ====
Saturday, December 8, 14:00

Sheet A	1	2	3	4	5	6	7	8	9	10	Final
Sweden (Sigfridsson)	0	0	1	0	2	0	0	1	0	0	4
Denmark (Nielsen) 🔨	1	1	0	2	0	0	1	0	1	2	8

Sheet B	1	2	3	4	5	6	7	8	9	10	Final
Italy (Gaspari)	0	1	0	0	0	0	3	0	1	2	7
Czech Republic (Klímová) 🔨	1	0	2	0	0	0	0	0	0	0	3

Sheet C	1	2	3	4	5	6	7	8	9	10	Final
Russia (Sidorova) 🔨	0	1	1	0	0	2	0	2	1	X	7
Germany (Schöpp)	1	0	0	0	1	0	1	0	0	X	3

Sheet D	1	2	3	4	5	6	7	8	9	10	Final
Scotland (Muirhead)	0	1	0	1	0	1	0	0	0	0	3
Switzerland (Ott) 🔨	0	0	1	0	1	0	0	2	0	1	5

Sheet E	1	2	3	4	5	6	7	8	9	10	Final
Finland (Malmi)	0	0	1	0	0	0	3	0	0	0	4
Hungary (Szekeres) 🔨	0	0	0	1	1	1	0	0	2	2	7

==== Draw 2 ====
Sunday, December 9, 8:00

Sheet A	1	2	3	4	5	6	7	8	9	10	Final
Switzerland (Ott)	0	0	1	0	0	0	2	0	X	X	3
Russia (Sidorova) 🔨	1	1	0	1	3	0	0	3	X	X	9

Sheet B	1	2	3	4	5	6	7	8	9	10	Final
Germany (Schöpp) 🔨	1	0	0	1	0	0	3	0	2	0	7
Denmark (Nielsen)	0	1	0	0	4	0	0	2	0	1	8

Sheet C	1	2	3	4	5	6	7	8	9	10	Final
Hungary (Szekeres)	0	0	1	0	2	0	0	3	0	X	6
Sweden (Sigfridsson) 🔨	0	1	0	2	0	2	1	0	2	X	8

Sheet D	1	2	3	4	5	6	7	8	9	10	Final
Czech Republic (Klímová)	0	0	0	3	0	2	0	1	0	4	10
Finland (Malmi) 🔨	0	0	2	0	1	0	1	0	2	0	6

Sheet E	1	2	3	4	5	6	7	8	9	10	Final
Italy (Gaspari)	0	1	0	1	0	0	0	0	X	X	2
Scotland (Muirhead) 🔨	1	0	1	0	1	1	2	2	X	X	8

==== Draw 3 ====
Sunday, December 9, 16:00

Sheet A	1	2	3	4	5	6	7	8	9	10	Final
Czech Republic (Klímová) 🔨	2	0	2	0	2	0	0	1	1	X	8
Hungary (Szekeres)	0	1	0	2	0	1	1	0	0	X	5

Sheet B	1	2	3	4	5	6	7	8	9	10	Final
Finland (Malmi)	0	1	0	0	2	0	2	0	X	X	5
Scotland (Muirhead) 🔨	1	0	4	1	0	1	0	4	X	X	11

Sheet C	1	2	3	4	5	6	7	8	9	10	Final
Italy (Gaspari)	0	0	1	0	1	0	2	0	X	X	4
Switzerland (Ott) 🔨	2	3	0	2	0	1	0	2	X	X	10

Sheet D	1	2	3	4	5	6	7	8	9	10	Final
Russia (Sidorova)	1	1	0	2	0	4	X	X	X	X	8
Denmark (Nielsen) 🔨	0	0	0	0	2	0	X	X	X	X	2

Sheet E	1	2	3	4	5	6	7	8	9	10	Final
Sweden (Sigfridsson) 🔨	0	1	3	0	0	1	0	1	0	X	6
Germany (Schöpp)	0	0	0	1	2	0	0	0	1	X	4

==== Draw 4 ====
Monday, December 10, 9:00

Sheet A	1	2	3	4	5	6	7	8	9	10	Final
Finland (Malmi)	0	2	0	3	0	0	1	0	0	2	8
Italy (Gaspari) 🔨	2	0	2	0	1	1	0	1	0	0	7

Sheet B	1	2	3	4	5	6	7	8	9	10	Final
Sweden (Sigfridsson) 🔨	3	0	5	3	0	1	X	X	X	X	12
Russia (Sidorova)	0	1	0	0	1	0	X	X	X	X	2

Sheet C	1	2	3	4	5	6	7	8	9	10	Final
Czech Republic (Klímová)	0	0	1	0	0	1	0	X	X	X	2
Scotland (Muirhead) 🔨	2	1	0	0	2	0	5	X	X	X	10

Sheet D	1	2	3	4	5	6	7	8	9	10	Final
Germany (Schöpp) 🔨	1	2	0	1	1	0	3	1	X	X	9
Hungary (Szekeres)	0	0	1	0	0	1	0	0	X	X	2

Sheet E	1	2	3	4	5	6	7	8	9	10	11	Final
Denmark (Nielsen) 🔨	1	0	1	2	0	0	0	1	0	1	2	8
Switzerland (Ott)	0	2	0	0	2	1	0	0	1	0	0	6

==== Draw 5 ====
Monday, December 10, 19:00

Sheet A	1	2	3	4	5	6	7	8	9	10	Final
Scotland (Muirhead)	0	0	0	1	0	0	1	X	X	X	2
Sweden (Sigfridsson) 🔨	0	3	2	0	2	2	0	X	X	X	9

Sheet B	1	2	3	4	5	6	7	8	9	10	Final
Switzerland (Ott) 🔨	2	1	1	0	2	0	1	0	2	X	9
Finland (Malmi)	0	0	0	2	0	1	0	1	0	X	4

Sheet C	1	2	3	4	5	6	7	8	9	10	Final
Denmark (Nielsen)	0	0	1	2	0	1	1	0	1	1	7
Hungary (Szekeres) 🔨	0	0	0	0	1	0	0	2	0	0	3

Sheet D	1	2	3	4	5	6	7	8	9	10	Final
Italy (Gaspari) 🔨	0	2	0	2	0	1	0	2	0	0	7
Russia (Sidorova)	1	0	2	0	1	0	3	0	2	3	12

Sheet E	1	2	3	4	5	6	7	8	9	10	Final
Germany (Schöpp)	0	0	2	0	1	2	0	0	0	2	7
Czech Republic (Klímová) 🔨	2	1	0	2	0	0	0	1	0	0	6

==== Draw 6 ====
Tuesday, December 11, 12:00

Sheet A	1	2	3	4	5	6	7	8	9	10	Final
Hungary (Szekeres)	0	0	0	1	0	0	0	X	X	X	1
Switzerland (Ott) 🔨	1	2	1	0	1	2	1	X	X	X	8

Sheet B	1	2	3	4	5	6	7	8	9	10	Final
Scotland (Muirhead) 🔨	3	1	1	0	2	0	0	0	0	X	7
Germany (Schöpp)	0	0	0	1	0	0	2	0	0	X	3

Sheet C	1	2	3	4	5	6	7	8	9	10	Final
Sweden (Sigfridsson)	0	2	0	3	0	1	5	X	X	X	11
Italy (Gaspari) 🔨	1	0	0	0	1	0	0	X	X	X	2

Sheet D	1	2	3	4	5	6	7	8	9	10	Final
Denmark (Nielsen) 🔨	0	2	0	0	0	1	0	2	0	X	5
Czech Republic (Klímová)	0	0	0	1	0	0	1	0	1	X	3

Sheet E	1	2	3	4	5	6	7	8	9	10	Final
Russia (Sidorova) 🔨	2	0	0	3	1	0	0	2	0	X	8
Finland (Malmi)	0	1	0	0	0	1	1	0	1	X	4

==== Draw 7 ====
Tuesday, December 11, 20:00

Sheet A	1	2	3	4	5	6	7	8	9	10	Final
Italy (Gaspari)	1	1	1	1	1	0	1	3	X	X	9
Germany (Schöpp) 🔨	0	0	0	0	0	2	0	0	X	X	2

Sheet B	1	2	3	4	5	6	7	8	9	10	Final
Russia (Sidorova) 🔨	0	0	0	3	1	3	0	0	1	X	8
Hungary (Szekeres)	0	0	0	0	0	0	2	1	0	X	3

Sheet C	1	2	3	4	5	6	7	8	9	10	Final
Switzerland (Ott)	0	1	1	0	0	3	0	0	2	X	7
Czech Republic (Klímová) 🔨	1	0	0	2	0	0	0	1	0	X	4

Sheet D	1	2	3	4	5	6	7	8	9	10	Final
Finland (Malmi) 🔨	0	1	0	1	0	0	X	X	X	X	2
Sweden (Sigfridsson)	0	0	3	0	3	3	X	X	X	X	9

Sheet E	1	2	3	4	5	6	7	8	9	10	Final
Scotland (Muirhead) 🔨	2	0	1	4	0	2	X	X	X	X	9
Denmark (Nielsen)	0	1	0	0	1	0	X	X	X	X	2

==== Draw 8 ====
Wednesday, December 12, 14:00

Sheet A	1	2	3	4	5	6	7	8	9	10	Final
Russia (Sidorova)	2	0	5	0	2	0	1	0	2	X	12
Czech Republic (Klímová) 🔨	0	2	0	2	0	1	0	2	0	X	7

Sheet B	1	2	3	4	5	6	7	8	9	10	Final
Denmark (Nielsen)	0	2	0	1	1	0	1	0	1	0	6
Italy (Gaspari) 🔨	1	0	1	0	0	2	0	2	0	1	7

Sheet C	1	2	3	4	5	6	7	8	9	10	Final
Germany (Schöpp) 🔨	4	0	1	1	1	0	4	X	X	X	11
Finland (Malmi)	0	1	0	0	0	1	0	X	X	X	2

Sheet D	1	2	3	4	5	6	7	8	9	10	Final
Hungary (Szekeres) 🔨	1	0	2	0	0	2	0	0	0	X	5
Scotland (Muirhead)	0	3	0	1	1	0	2	1	0	X	8

Sheet E	1	2	3	4	5	6	7	8	9	10	Final
Switzerland (Ott) 🔨	0	1	0	0	1	0	1	2	0	0	5
Sweden (Sigfridsson)	2	0	2	1	0	1	0	0	1	1	8

==== Draw 9 ====
Thursday, December 13, 8:00

Sheet A	1	2	3	4	5	6	7	8	9	10	Final
Denmark (Nielsen) 🔨	0	1	0	0	3	1	1	1	2	X	9
Finland (Malmi)	0	0	1	0	0	0	0	0	0	X	1

Sheet B	1	2	3	4	5	6	7	8	9	10	Final
Czech Republic (Klímová) 🔨	2	0	1	0	2	0	1	0	1	X	7
Sweden (Sigfridsson)	0	1	0	1	0	1	0	2	0	X	5

Sheet C	1	2	3	4	5	6	7	8	9	10	Final
Scotland (Muirhead) 🔨	2	0	0	2	0	1	0	0	0	1	6
Russia (Sidorova)	0	3	1	0	0	0	0	1	0	0	5

Sheet D	1	2	3	4	5	6	7	8	9	10	Final
Switzerland (Ott)	0	1	0	0	2	0	3	0	4	X	10
Germany (Schöpp) 🔨	1	0	0	2	0	1	0	1	0	X	5

Sheet E	1	2	3	4	5	6	7	8	9	10	Final
Hungary (Szekeres)	0	2	0	0	0	2	0	0	1	X	5
Italy (Gaspari) 🔨	2	0	1	0	0	0	3	4	0	X	10

=== Tiebreaker ===
Thursday, December 13, 15:00

Sheet E	1	2	3	4	5	6	7	8	9	10	Final
Denmark (Nielsen)	1	0	0	1	0	1	1	2	0	X	6
Switzerland (Ott) 🔨	0	0	1	0	0	0	0	0	2	X	3

Player percentages
Denmark		Switzerland	
Maria Poulsen	89%	Janine Greiner	85%
Jeanne Ellegaard	85%	Carmen Küng	79%
Helle Simonsen	76%	Carmen Schäfer	83%
Lene Nielsen	69%	Mirjam Ott	63%
Total	80%	Total	78%

=== Placement game ===
Thursday, December 13, 15:00

Sheet D	1	2	3	4	5	6	7	8	9	10	Final
Germany (Schöpp) 🔨	1	1	0	0	0	1	0	1	0	1	5
Czech Republic (Klímová)	0	0	1	0	1	0	1	0	1	0	4

Germany was scheduled to play in the World Challenge Games, a best-of-three series with the winner of Group B to determine which team advances to the World Women's Championships, but the winner of Group B, Latvia, was qualified as the host of the World Women's Championships, so Germany qualified automatically.

=== Playoffs ===
Page playoff system
1	Sweden	3
2	Scotland	9
3	Russia	7
4	Denmark	6

Semifinal
1	Sweden	6
3	Russia	8

Final
2	Scotland	5
3	Russia	6

Bronze-medal game
1	Sweden	9
4	Denmark	3

==== 1 vs. 2 ====
Friday, December 14, 13:00

Sheet E	1	2	3	4	5	6	7	8	9	10	Final
Sweden (Sigfridsson)	0	1	0	1	0	1	0	0	0	X	3
Scotland (Muirhead)	0	0	1	0	2	0	0	4	2	X	9

Player percentages
Sweden		Scotland	
Margaretha Sigfridsson	89%	Claire Hamilton	76%
Maria Wennerström	83%	Vicki Adams	83%
Christina Bertrup	79%	Anna Sloan	72%
Maria Prytz	82%	Eve Muirhead	96%
Total	83%	Total	82%

==== 3 vs. 4 ====
Friday, December 14, 13:00

Team	1	2	3	4	5	6	7	8	9	10	Final
Russia (Sidorova)	1	0	0	2	0	2	1	0	0	1	7
Denmark (Nielsen)	0	0	3	0	2	0	0	1	0	0	6

Player percentages
Russia		Denmark	
Ekaterina Galkina	78%	Maria Poulsen	88%
Margarita Fomina	75%	Jeanne Ellegaard	77%
Liudmila Privivkova	77%	Helle Simonsen	83%
Anna Sidorova	75%	Lene Nielsen	63%
Total	76%	Total	78%

==== Semifinal ====
Friday, December 14, 20:00

Team	1	2	3	4	5	6	7	8	9	10	11	Final
Sweden (Sigfridsson) 🔨	2	0	2	0	1	0	0	0	1	0	0	6
Russia (Sidorova)	0	3	0	1	0	0	0	1	0	1	2	8

Player percentages
Sweden		Russia	
Margaretha Sigfridsson	76%	Ekaterina Galkina	84%
Maria Wennerström	89%	Margarita Fomina	79%
Christina Bertrup	76%	Liudmila Privivkova	81%
Maria Prytz	80%	Anna Sidorova	80%
Total	80%	Total	81%

==== Bronze-medal game ====
Saturday, December 15, 10:00

Team	1	2	3	4	5	6	7	8	9	10	Final
Sweden (Sigfridsson) 🔨	2	0	2	0	3	0	1	1	X	X	9
Denmark (Nielsen)	0	1	0	1	0	1	0	0	X	X	3

Player percentages
Sweden		Denmark	
Margaretha Sigfridsson	78%	Maria Poulsen	84%
Maria Wennerström	86%	Jeanne Ellegaard	80%
Christina Bertrup	93%	Helle Simonsen	76%
Maria Prytz	93%	Lene Nielsen	63%
Total	87%	Total	76%

==== Gold-medal game ====
Saturday, December 15, 10:00

Sheet B	1	2	3	4	5	6	7	8	9	10	11	Final
Scotland (Muirhead) 🔨	0	0	2	0	0	2	0	0	0	1	0	5
Russia (Sidorova)	1	0	0	1	1	0	1	0	1	0	1	6

Player percentages
Scotland		Russia	
Claire Hamilton	82%	Ekaterina Galkina	81%
Vicki Adams	78%	Margarita Fomina	86%
Anna Sloan	79%	Liudmila Privivkova	81%
Eve Muirhead	85%	Anna Sidorova	77%
Total	81%	Total	81%

2012 European Curling Championships – Women's winner
(Russia)
Russia
2nd title

=== Player percentages ===
Round Robin only

Leads	%
(Sweden) Margaretha Sigfridsson	83
(Russia) Ekaterina Galkina	82
(Denmark) Maria Poulsen	82
(Scotland) Claire Hamilton	75
(Germany) Corinna Scholz	75

Seconds	%
(Sweden) Maria Wennerström	81
(Switzerland) Carmen Küng	79
(Scotland) Vicki Adams	79
(Russia) Margarita Fomina	78
(Denmark) Jeanne Ellegaard	77

Thirds	%
(Sweden) Christina Bertrup	81
(Switzerland) Carmen Schäfer	80
(Scotland) Anna Sloan	79
(Russia) Liudmila Privivkova	78
(Denmark) Helle Simonsen	76

Skips/Fourths	%
(Sweden) Maria Prytz	84
(Scotland) Eve Muirhead	79
(Russia) Anna Sidorova	78
(Switzerland) Mirjam Ott	76
(Denmark) Lene Nielsen	73

== Group B ==
=== Teams ===
The teams are listed as follows:

Austria	Belarus	England	Estonia	Latvia
Skip: Karina Toth Third: Constanze Hummelt; Second: Anna Weghuber; Lead: Marijke Reitsma	Skip: Ekaterina Kirillova Third: Alina Pauliuchyk; Second: Suzanna Ivashyna; Lead: Natallia Sviarzhinskaya; Alternate: Arina Sviarzhinskaya	Skip: Fiona Hawker Third: Susan Young; Second: Alison Hemmings; Lead: Deborah Hutcheon; Alternate: Angharad Ward	Skip: Maile Mölder Third: Kristiine Lill; Second: Küllike Ustav; Lead: Kaja Liik-Tamm	Skip: Iveta Staša-Šaršūne Third: Ieva Krusta; Second: Zanda Bikše; Lead: Dace Munča; Alternate: Una Germane
Norway	Poland	Slovakia	Spain	Turkey
Skip: Linn Githmark Third: Kristine Davanger; Second: Ingrid Michalsen; Lead: Kristin Skaslien; Alternate: Camilla Groeseth	Skip: Elżbieta Ran Third: Magda Strączek; Second: Magdalena Dumanowska; Lead: Agata Musik; Alternate: Justyna Wojtas	Skip: Daniela Matulová Third: Veronika Kvasnovská; Second: Linda Haferová; Lead: Terezia Gabovicová; Alternate: Terezia Hubácková	Skip: Irantzu García Third: Oihane Otaegi; Second: Estrella Labrador; Lead: María Fernández; Alternate: Itziar Ortiz de Urbina	Skip: Elif Kızılkaya Third: Öznur Polat; Second: Dilşat Yıldız; Lead: Ayşe Gözütok; Alternate: Şeyda Zengin

=== Round-robin results ===
Final round-robin standings

Key
Teams to Playoffs
Countries relegated to 2013 Group C

Country	Skip	W	L
Norway	Linn Githmark	9	0
Estonia	Maile Mölder	7	2
Latvia	Iveta Staša-Šaršūne	6	3
Austria	Karina Toth	5	4
Turkey	Elif Kızılkaya	4	5
Poland	Elzbieta Ran	4	5
England	Fiona Hawker	3	6
Spain	Irantzu Garcia	3	6
Belarus	Ekaterina Kirillova	2	7
Slovakia	Daniela Matulová	2	7

==== Draw 1 ====
Saturday, December 8, 12:00

Sheet A	1	2	3	4	5	6	7	8	9	10	Final
Norway (Githmark) 🔨	0	0	0	3	0	0	3	1	0	X	7
Slovakia (Matulová)	1	0	0	0	0	1	0	0	2	X	4

Sheet B	1	2	3	4	5	6	7	8	9	10	Final
Poland (Ran) 🔨	2	2	0	6	0	4	X	X	X	X	14
Austria (Toth)	0	0	1	0	2	0	X	X	X	X	3

Sheet C	1	2	3	4	5	6	7	8	9	10	Final
Estonia (Mölder) 🔨	1	0	0	0	0	1	1	1	0	0	4
England (Hawker)	0	1	1	1	1	0	0	0	1	1	6

Sheet D	1	2	3	4	5	6	7	8	9	10	Final
Spain (Garcia)	0	3	0	0	2	0	2	3	0	X	10
Belarus (Kirillova) 🔨	1	0	1	1	0	1	0	0	2	X	6

Sheet F	1	2	3	4	5	6	7	8	9	10	11	Final
Turkey (Kızılkaya)	0	0	0	2	0	0	0	2	1	0	1	6
Latvia (Staša-Šaršūne) 🔨	0	1	0	0	1	1	1	0	0	1	0	5

==== Draw 2 ====
Saturday, December 8, 20:00

Sheet A	1	2	3	4	5	6	7	8	9	10	Final
Poland (Ran)	0	2	2	0	2	0	1	2	X	X	9
Spain (Garcia) 🔨	1	0	0	1	0	1	0	0	X	X	3

Sheet C	1	2	3	4	5	6	7	8	9	10	Final
Turkey (Kızılkaya)	0	2	0	2	0	3	1	X	X	X	8
Slovakia (Matulová) 🔨	1	0	0	0	1	0	0	X	X	X	2

Sheet D	1	2	3	4	5	6	7	8	9	10	Final
Latvia (Staša-Šaršūne) 🔨	0	1	0	0	2	0	1	0	0	X	4
Estonia (Mölder)	3	0	3	1	0	0	0	1	1	X	9

Sheet E	1	2	3	4	5	6	7	8	9	10	Final
Norway (Githmark)	2	2	0	3	2	0	X	X	X	X	9
Belarus (Kirillova) 🔨	0	0	2	0	0	1	X	X	X	X	3

Sheet F	1	2	3	4	5	6	7	8	9	10	Final
England (Hawker)	0	0	2	0	0	2	0	X	X	X	4
Austria (Toth) 🔨	4	1	0	2	1	0	3	X	X	X	11

==== Draw 3 ====
Sunday, December 9, 12:00

Sheet A	1	2	3	4	5	6	7	8	9	10	Final
England (Hawker) 🔨	1	0	0	2	0	1	0	0	X	X	4
Latvia (Staša-Šaršūne)	0	4	1	0	3	0	2	1	X	X	11

Sheet B	1	2	3	4	5	6	7	8	9	10	Final
Belarus (Kirillova)	0	2	0	0	2	2	2	0	X	X	8
Slovakia (Matulová) 🔨	0	0	0	2	0	0	0	1	X	X	3

Sheet C	1	2	3	4	5	6	7	8	9	10	Final
Norway (Githmark) 🔨	3	0	0	3	0	0	1	X	X	X	7
Poland (Ran)	0	0	0	0	1	0	0	X	X	X	1

Sheet D	1	2	3	4	5	6	7	8	9	10	Final
Turkey (Kızılkaya)	0	2	2	0	0	2	0	1	0	0	7
Austria (Toth) 🔨	1	0	0	1	3	0	2	0	0	1	8

Sheet F	1	2	3	4	5	6	7	8	9	10	Final
Spain (Garcia) 🔨	0	0	0	1	0	1	0	0	2	0	4
Estonia (Mölder)	0	0	0	0	1	0	2	1	0	2	6

==== Draw 4 ====
Sunday, December 9, 20:00

Sheet A	1	2	3	4	5	6	7	8	9	10	Final
Estonia (Mölder)	0	2	0	1	0	1	0	2	0	2	8
Poland (Ran) 🔨	2	0	1	0	1	0	2	0	1	0	7

Sheet B	1	2	3	4	5	6	7	8	9	10	Final
Spain (Garcia) 🔨	1	0	0	1	0	0	0	2	0	X	4
England (Hawker)	0	2	1	0	1	2	1	0	2	X	9

Sheet C	1	2	3	4	5	6	7	8	9	10	Final
Slovakia (Matulová)	0	0	0	0	2	0	2	0	X	X	4
Austria (Toth) 🔨	0	1	4	2	0	1	0	2	X	X	10

Sheet E	1	2	3	4	5	6	7	8	9	10	Final
Latvia (Staša-Šaršūne)	0	0	0	0	0	1	1	0	X	X	2
Norway (Githmark) 🔨	1	0	1	2	2	0	0	2	X	X	8

Sheet F	1	2	3	4	5	6	7	8	9	10	Final
Belarus (Kirillova)	1	0	0	0	1	0	2	0	0	X	4
Turkey (Kızılkaya) 🔨	0	1	1	1	0	2	0	1	2	X	8

==== Draw 5 ====
Monday, December 10, 12:00

Sheet A	1	2	3	4	5	6	7	8	9	10	Final
Slovakia (Matulová) 🔨	2	1	1	1	3	1	X	X	X	X	9
England (Hawker)	0	0	0	0	0	0	X	X	X	X	0

Sheet B	1	2	3	4	5	6	7	8	9	10	Final
Latvia (Staša-Šaršūne) 🔨	1	0	0	3	0	0	2	1	1	X	8
Poland (Ran)	0	3	0	0	1	0	0	0	0	X	4

Sheet C	1	2	3	4	5	6	7	8	9	10	Final
Belarus (Kirillova)	0	0	0	0	0	0	1	0	0	X	1
Estonia (Mölder) 🔨	0	1	1	0	1	1	0	0	0	X	4

Sheet E	1	2	3	4	5	6	7	8	9	10	Final
Turkey (Kızılkaya)	0	0	0	0	0	1	0	0	X	X	1
Spain (Garcia) 🔨	0	2	1	1	3	0	1	1	X	X	9

Sheet F	1	2	3	4	5	6	7	8	9	10	Final
Austria (Toth)	0	0	0	0	0	2	0	0	0	X	2
Norway (Githmark) 🔨	0	0	2	0	1	0	2	1	1	X	7

==== Draw 6 ====
Monday, December 10, 20:00

Sheet B	1	2	3	4	5	6	7	8	9	10	Final
Austria (Toth) 🔨	2	2	0	4	2	0	X	X	X	X	10
Belarus (Kirillova)	0	0	1	0	0	1	X	X	X	X	2

Sheet C	1	2	3	4	5	6	7	8	9	10	Final
Latvia (Staša-Šaršūne) 🔨	0	0	0	0	1	1	0	1	1	0	4
Spain (Garcia)	1	0	0	1	0	0	0	0	0	1	3

Sheet D	1	2	3	4	5	6	7	8	9	10	Final
Norway (Githmark) 🔨	2	0	1	1	0	1	0	2	2	X	9
Turkey (Kızılkaya)	0	1	0	0	1	0	1	0	0	X	3

Sheet E	1	2	3	4	5	6	7	8	9	10	Final
Poland (Ran)	1	2	4	0	3	0	0	1	X	X	11
England (Hawker) 🔨	0	0	0	2	0	2	1	0	X	X	5

Sheet F	1	2	3	4	5	6	7	8	9	10	Final
Estonia (Mölder) 🔨	2	0	0	5	1	0	2	X	X	X	10
Slovakia (Matulová)	0	2	1	0	0	1	0	X	X	X	4

==== Draw 7 ====
Tuesday, December 11, 12:00

Sheet A	1	2	3	4	5	6	7	8	9	10	Final
Spain (Garcia)	0	0	1	0	0	1	1	0	1	X	4
Austria (Toth) 🔨	0	2	0	2	1	0	0	2	0	X	7

Sheet B	1	2	3	4	5	6	7	8	9	10	Final
Estonia (Mölder) 🔨	0	2	0	1	1	0	1	0	0	1	6
Norway (Githmark)	1	0	1	0	0	2	0	2	1	0	7

Sheet C	1	2	3	4	5	6	7	8	9	10	Final
Poland (Ran)	0	4	0	2	0	0	2	1	1	0	10
Turkey (Kızılkaya) 🔨	3	0	4	0	2	1	0	0	0	1	11

Sheet D	1	2	3	4	5	6	7	8	9	10	Final
Belarus (Kirillova)	0	2	2	0	1	0	1	0	1	2	9
England (Hawker) 🔨	2	0	0	1	0	1	0	1	0	0	5

Sheet E	1	2	3	4	5	6	7	8	9	10	11	Final
Slovakia (Matulová)	0	1	2	1	0	0	1	0	2	0	0	7
Latvia (Staša-Šaršūne) 🔨	1	0	0	0	2	1	0	1	0	2	1	8

==== Draw 8 ====
Tuesday, December 11, 20:00

Sheet A	1	2	3	4	5	6	7	8	9	10	Final
Latvia (Staša-Šaršūne)	0	1	0	1	0	1	0	2	0	2	7
Belarus (Kirillova) 🔨	0	0	2	0	1	0	1	0	2	0	6

Sheet B	1	2	3	4	5	6	7	8	9	10	Final
England (Hawker)	0	0	2	1	2	0	0	0	0	2	7
Turkey (Kızılkaya) 🔨	1	1	0	0	0	0	2	1	1	0	6

Sheet D	1	2	3	4	5	6	7	8	9	10	Final
Slovakia (Matulová)	0	2	3	2	0	1	0	2	X	X	10
Poland (Ran) 🔨	0	0	0	0	1	0	1	0	X	X	2

Sheet E	1	2	3	4	5	6	7	8	9	10	Final
Austria (Toth) 🔨	0	0	2	0	0	1	0	1	0	0	4
Estonia (Mölder)	0	0	0	0	2	0	1	0	0	2	5

Sheet F	1	2	3	4	5	6	7	8	9	10	Final
Norway (Githmark)	0	2	3	2	0	2	0	3	X	X	12
Spain (Garcia) 🔨	4	0	0	0	1	0	2	0	X	X	7

==== Draw 9 ====
Wednesday, December 12, 12:00

Sheet A	1	2	3	4	5	6	7	8	9	10	Final
Turkey (Kızılkaya)	0	1	0	1	0	1	0	2	0	X	5
Estonia (Mölder)	3	0	1	0	2	0	2	0	4	X	12

Sheet C	1	2	3	4	5	6	7	8	9	10	11	Final
Austria (Toth)	0	1	0	2	0	1	0	0	1	1	0	6
Latvia (Staša-Šaršūne)	0	0	1	0	2	0	2	1	0	0	1	7

Sheet D	1	2	3	4	5	6	7	8	9	10	Final
England (Hawker)	2	0	0	1	0	0	1	0	X	X	4
Norway (Githmark)	0	1	1	0	5	1	0	1	X	X	9

Sheet E	1	2	3	4	5	6	7	8	9	10	Final
Spain (Garcia)	0	2	0	0	2	0	4	0	X	X	8
Slovakia (Matulová)	0	0	0	1	0	1	0	1	X	X	3

Sheet F	1	2	3	4	5	6	7	8	9	10	Final
Poland (Ran)	2	0	0	2	1	0	0	0	2	X	7
Belarus (Kirillova)	0	0	2	0	0	0	1	1	0	X	4

=== Playoffs ===
Page playoff system
1	Norway	10
2	Estonia	5
3	Latvia	9
4	Austria	4

Semifinal
2	Estonia	3
3	Latvia	9

Gold-medal game
1	Norway	4
3	Latvia	7

Bronze-medal game
2	Estonia	5
4	Austria	8

==== 1 vs. 2 ====
Thursday, December 13, 20:00

Team	1	2	3	4	5	6	7	8	9	10	Final
Norway (Githmark) 🔨	1	0	0	2	0	5	0	0	2	X	10
Estonia (Mölder)	0	0	1	0	2	0	1	1	0	X	5

==== 3 vs. 4 ====
Thursday, December 13, 20:00

Team	1	2	3	4	5	6	7	8	9	10	Final
Latvia (Staša-Šaršūne)	0	0	3	1	2	0	1	1	1	X	9
Austria (Toth) 🔨	2	1	0	0	0	1	0	0	0	X	4

==== Semifinal ====
Friday, December 14, 8:00

Team	1	2	3	4	5	6	7	8	9	10	Final
Estonia (Mölder) 🔨	1	0	1	0	0	0	0	1	0	X	3
Latvia (Staša-Šaršūne)	0	1	0	1	1	0	2	0	4	X	9

==== Bronze-medal game ====
Friday, December 14, 13:00

Team	1	2	3	4	5	6	7	8	9	10	Final
Estonia (Mölder) 🔨	0	0	0	2	1	0	1	0	1	X	5
Austria (Toth)	2	1	2	0	0	2	0	1	0	X	8

==== Gold-medal game ====
Friday, December 14, 13:00

Team	1	2	3	4	5	6	7	8	9	10	Final
Norway (Githmark) 🔨	1	0	1	1	1	0	0	0	0	X	4
Latvia (Staša-Šaršūne)	0	1	0	0	0	0	1	4	1	X	7

== Group C ==
=== Teams ===
The teams are listed as follows:

Belarus	Croatia	Netherlands
Skip: Ekaterina Kirillova Third: Alina Pauliuchyk; Second: Natallia Sviarzhinskaya; Lead: Suzanna Ivashyna; Alternate: Arina Sviarzhinskaya	Skip: Melani Lusic Third: Maja Sertic; Second: Emina Crnaic; Lead: Marijana Bozic; Alternate: Katarina Vidakovic	Skip: Marianne Neeleman Third: Kimberly Honders; Second: Bonnie Nilhamn; Lead: Lisette Brilman
Romania	Slovenia	Turkey
Skip: Daiana Raluca Colceriu Third: Bianca Neagoe; Second: Diana Butucea; Lead: Raluca Diana Grapa	Skip: Valentina Jurincic Third: Maja Kremzar; Second: Nadja Pipan; Lead: Anja Kresnik	Skip: Öznur Polat Third: Elif Kızılkaya; Second: Dilşat Yıldız; Lead: Ayşe Gözütok; Alternate: Şeyda Zengin

=== Round-robin standings ===
Final round-robin standings

Key
Teams to Playoffs

Country	Skip	W	L
Turkey	Öznur Polat	5	0
Belarus	Ekaterina Kirillova	3	2
Netherlands	Marianne Neeleman	3	2
Croatia	Melani Lusic	2	3
Romania	Daiana Raluca Colceriu	1	4
Slovenia	Valentina Jurincic	1	4

=== Round-robin results ===
==== Draw 1 ====
Friday, October 5, 17:30

Sheet A	1	2	3	4	5	6	7	8	Final
Romania (Colceriu) 🔨	0	1	0	2	1	0	0	0	4
Croatia (Lusic)	2	0	0	1	0	3	1	1	8

Sheet B	1	2	3	4	5	6	7	8	Final
Turkey (Polat)	2	3	1	3	0	5	X	X	14
Netherlands (Neeleman) 🔨	0	0	0	0	1	0	X	X	1

==== Draw 2 ====
Saturday, October 6, 9:00

Sheet B	1	2	3	4	5	6	7	8	Final
Croatia (Lusic) 🔨	2	0	1	2	1	0	4	X	10
Slovenia (Jurincic)	0	2	0	0	0	1	0	X	3

Sheet D	1	2	3	4	5	6	7	8	Final
Romania (Colceriu)	0	0	0	0	0	0	X	X	0
Belarus (Kirllova) 🔨	1	1	2	0	2	3	X	X	9

==== Draw 3 ====
Saturday, October 6, 13:00

Sheet A	1	2	3	4	5	6	7	8	Final
Belarus (Kirllova)	0	1	0	2	0	1	2	0	6
Slovenia (Jurincic) 🔨	1	0	2	0	1	0	0	3	7

==== Draw 4 ====
Sunday, October 7, 9:00

Sheet C	1	2	3	4	5	6	7	8	Final
Turkey (Polat) 🔨	2	3	2	0	5	0	X	X	12
Romania (Colceriu)	0	0	0	1	0	1	X	X	2

Sheet D	1	2	3	4	5	6	7	8	Final
Slovenia (Jurincic)	0	0	0	0	2	2	1	X	5
Netherlands (Neeleman) 🔨	2	1	2	2	0	0	0	X	7

==== Draw 5 ====
Sunday, October 7, 14:00

Sheet E	1	2	3	4	5	6	7	8	Final
Belarus (Kirllova)	0	0	0	0	2	0	0	6	8
Croatia (Lusic) 🔨	0	1	0	1	0	1	0	0	3

==== Draw 6 ====
Sunday, October 7, 19:00

Sheet C	1	2	3	4	5	6	7	8	9	Final
Netherlands (Neeleman)	0	2	1	1	0	0	1	0	3	8
Croatia (Lusic) 🔨	1	0	0	0	1	1	0	2	0	5

Sheet E	1	2	3	4	5	6	7	8	Final
Turkey (Polat) 🔨	1	3	0	2	1	1	0	X	8
Slovenia (Jurincic)	0	0	3	0	0	0	2	X	5

==== Draw 7 ====
Monday, October 8, 9:00

Sheet A	1	2	3	4	5	6	7	8	Final
Croatia (Lusic) 🔨	0	1	0	1	0	1	X	X	3
Turkey (Polat)	0	0	4	0	5	0	X	X	9

Sheet E	1	2	3	4	5	6	7	8	Final
Romania (Colceriu)	1	0	0	0	0	0	X	X	1
Netherlands (Neeleman) 🔨	0	2	2	1	5	1	X	X	11

==== Draw 8 ====
Monday, October 8, 14:00

Sheet B	1	2	3	4	5	6	7	8	Final
Netherlands (Neeleman)	0	1	0	0	2	0	0	X	3
Belarus (Kirillova) 🔨	2	0	2	1	0	1	1	X	7

==== Draw 9 ====
Monday, October 8, 19:00

Sheet A	1	2	3	4	5	6	7	8	Final
Slovenia (Jurincic)	0	2	1	2	0	0	0	X	5
Romania (Colceriu) 🔨	1	0	0	0	1	3	3	X	8

Sheet C	1	2	3	4	5	6	7	8	Final
Belarus (Kirllova)	0	0	0	0	0	0	X	X	0
Turkey (Polat) 🔨	1	2	0	1	1	2	X	X	7

=== Playoffs ===
In the playoffs, the first and second seeds, Turkey and Belarus, played a semifinal game to determine the first team to advance to the Group B competitions. The loser of this game, along with the winners of the semifinal game played by the third and fourth seeds, the Netherlands and Croatia, advance to the second place game, which determines the second team to advance to the Group B competitions.

Second Place Game
1	Turkey	8
3	Netherlands	4

Semifinals
1	Turkey	6
2	Belarus	10
3	Netherlands	11
4	Croatia	3

==== Semifinals ====
Tuesday, October 9, 18:00

Team	1	2	3	4	5	6	7	8	9	Final
Turkey (Polat) 🔨	0	1	2	2	0	0	0	1	0	6
Belarus (Kirillova)	1	0	0	0	2	2	1	0	4	10

Belarus advances to the Group B competitions.
Turkey moves to Second Place Game.

Team	1	2	3	4	5	6	7	8	Final
Netherlands (Neeleman)	3	0	5	1	0	2	X	X	11
Croatia (Lusic) 🔨	0	1	0	0	2	0	X	X	3

Netherlands advances to Second Place Game

==== Second Place Game ====
Wednesday, October 10, 10:00

Sheet A	1	2	3	4	5	6	7	8	Final
Turkey (Polat) 🔨	1	0	0	1	2	0	4	X	8
Netherlands (Neeleman)	0	3	0	0	0	1	0	X	4

Turkey advances to the Group B competitions.
