= Mihriban Polat =

Turkish curler

- Curler
- Born: Erzurum, Turkey

Team
- Curling club: Milli Piyango CA, Erzurum

Curling career
- Member Association: Turkey
- World Championship: 2 (2022, 2023)
- European Championship: 4 (2019, 2021, 2022, 2023)

Mihriban Polat is a Turkish curler from Erzurum, Turkey.

== Career ==
Polat joined the Turkey women's junior national team in 2016 as the teams' lead. At the 2016 World Junior Curling Championships, her team, led by skip Dilşat Yıldız, won three matches against Hungary, Japan and Russia, placing them eighth in the event. She then moved up to third on the team in 2017. The team had two runner-up finishes at the World Junior-B Curling Championships in both 2017 and 2018, however, Polat did not attend the 2017 World Junior Curling Championships. She would play second on the Turkish team at the 2018 World Junior Curling Championships, where they finished in last place with a 1–8 record. With Yıldız aged out of juniors, Polat took over the junior rink for the 2018–19 season. She skipped the junior team for two seasons, unable to qualify them for the World Junior Curling Championships in both attempts at the World Junior-B Curling Championships.

While still in juniors, Polat skipped the Turkish team to a silver medal at the 2017 European Youth Olympic Winter Festival at home in Erzurum. After finishing the round robin in first place with a 3–1 record and defeating Poland in the semifinal, the team lost 7–2 to Russia's Irina Nizovtseva in the championship game.

Polat joined the Turkey women's national team in 2019 as their lead. She played with the team at the 2019 European Curling Championships, where they topped the round robin in the B Division with a 7–2 record. This earned them the top seed in the playoff round, where they easily defeated England 9–4 in the semifinal. This advanced the Turkish side to the final, which they would drop 5–2 to Italy's Veronica Zappone. Despite the loss, their top two finish not only earned them a berth in the A Division for 2021, but also a spot at the 2020 World Qualification Event for a chance to qualify for the 2020 World Women's Curling Championship. At the event, Yıldız led Turkey to a 4–3 round robin record, enough to earn the third playoff spot. They then faced Italy for the final berth in the World Championship. Again, however, the Italians got the best of Team Turkey, defeating them 8–4 and earning the last spot at the Women's Worlds. The Turkish team did not compete in any international events during the 2020–21 season due to the cancellation of all events because of the COVID-19 pandemic. Berfin Şengül and Ayşe Gözütok joined the Turkish team the following season, shifting Polat to alternate on the team.

The 2021–22 season was a breakout season for Turkish curling, as the nation found relative successful in the international events they attended. At the start of the season, Erzurum hosted the 2021 Pre-Olympic Qualification Event to qualify teams for the 2021 Olympic Qualification Event. In the women's event, the Turkish team succeeded in qualifying for the Olympic Qualification Event, going 5–1 through the round robin and knockout round. Their next event was the 2021 European Curling Championships, where Turkey competed in the A Division. Through the event, Turkey posted three victories against Denmark, Estonia and Italy, enough to finish in seventh place in the group. This seventh-place finish was enough to earn them a direct spot into the 2022 World Women's Curling Championship, the first time Turkey ever qualified for a men's or women's world championship. Next was the Olympic Qualification Event, held December 5 to 18 in Leeuwarden, Netherlands. Polat, with Yıldız, Öznur Polat, Berfin Şengül and Ayşe Gözütok, finished 3–5 through the round robin. Their three victories, however, came against the top three teams in the event. The team defeated the eventual Olympic gold and silver medalists Eve Muirhead and Satsuki Fujisawa, as well as the silver medalists from 2018 in Korea's Kim Eun-jung. Into the new year, Polat and the women's team represented Turkey at the World Championship. After losing multiple close games in extra ends, the Turkish team was able to record their first victory in World Women's Championship history against Czech Republic's Alžběta Baudyšová 7–5 in Draw 17 of the event. The team ultimately finished the event in eleventh place with a 2–10 record, recording their second victory against the Scottish team who had to withdraw before the event began.

Team Yıldız had their best European Championship to date at the 2022 European Curling Championships. After three consecutive losses, the team won five straight games which included wins over higher seeded Germany, Denmark and Norway. In their final game, they lost a narrow 8–7 match to Sweden's Anna Hasselborg, finishing in sixth place and just outside of the playoffs. As they had finished in the top eight, however, they qualified once again for the 2023 World Women's Curling Championship. There, the team of Dilşat Yıldız, Öznur Polat, Polat, Berfin Şengül and İfayet Şafak Çalıkuşu again had a slow start, going 1–4 in their first five games. They then picked up momentum, winning four of their next five games, which included wins against Japan, Korea, Germany and Denmark. Needing to win their next two games to qualify for the playoffs, they fell 10–4 to Canada, eliminating them from contention. They were able to beat Scotland in their final round robin game to finish in eighth place with an even 6–6 record in their second world championship appearance.

In preparation for the 2023 European Curling Championships, the Turkish women's team played in two tour events. After a fourth-place finish at the Sundbyberg Open, the team advanced to the final of the WCT Tallinn Ladies Challenger where they lost to Evelīna Barone. At the Europeans in Aberdeen, the team did not replicate their success from 2022, instead finishing tied for last in the group with Czechia and Germany at 2–7. However, because their two victories came against these two teams, they finished eighth overall and earned qualification into the 2024 World Women's Curling Championship for a third straight year. Following the European championships, Polat was replaced on the team by İclal Karaman.

== Personal life ==
Polat is employed as an athlete.

== Teams ==
Season	Skip	Third	Second	Lead	Alternate
2015–16	Dilşat Yıldız	Semiha Konuksever	Berivan Polat	Mihriban Polat	
2016–17	Dilşat Yıldız	Mihriban Polat	Beyzanur Konuksever	Berivan Polat	
2016–17	Mihriban Polat	Berivan Polat	Kader Macit	Zeynep Oztemir	Hilal Nevruz
2017–18	Dilşat Yıldız	Berivan Polat	Mihriban Polat	Zeynep Oztemir	Canan Temuren
2018–19	Mihriban Polat	Seyda Barış	Kader Macit	Hilal Nevruz	Elanur Parlayanyildiz
2019–20	Dilşat Yıldız	Öznur Polat	Semiha Konuksever	Mihriban Polat	
2019–20	Mihriban Polat	Kader Macit	Hilal Nevruz	Selenay Diler	İfayet Şafak Çalıkuşu
2021–22	Dilşat Yıldız	Öznur Polat	Berfin Şengül	Ayşe Gözütok	Mihriban Polat
2021–22	Beyzanur Konuksever	Selenay Diler	İfayet Şafak Çalıkuşu	Mihriban Polat	
2022–23	Dilşat Yıldız	Öznur Polat	İfayet Şafak Çalıkuşu	Mihriban Polat	Berfin Şengül
2023–24	Dilşat Yıldız	Öznur Polat	İfayet Şafak Çalıkuşu	Berfin Şengül	Mihriban Polat
