= Dilşat Yıldız =

Turkish curler (born 1996)

- Curler
- Born: 29 September 1996 (age 30); Erzurum, Turkey

Team
- Curling club: Milli Piyango CA, Erzurum
- Skip: Dilşat Yıldız
- Third: Berfin Şengül
- Second: Melisa Cömert
- Lead: Seydanur Morkoç
- Alternate: Şüheda Karacalı
- Mixed doubles partner: Bilal Ömer Çakır

Curling career
- Member Association: Turkey
- World Championship: 5 (2022, 2023, 2024, 2025, 2026)
- World Mixed Doubles Championship: 8 (2016, 2017, 2018, 2019, 2022, 2023, 2024, 2025)
- European Championship: 14 (2012, 2013, 2014, 2015, 2016, 2017, 2018, 2019, 2021, 2022, 2023, 2024, 2025, 2026)
Medal record
Women's Curling
Representing Turkey
European Championships
Gold medal – first place	2019 Helsingborg	Group B
Silver medal – second place	2018 Tallinn	Group B
Silver medal – second place	2016 Renfrewshire	Group B
Silver medal – second place	2012 Karlstad	Group C

Dilşat Yıldız (born 29 September 1996) is a Turkish female curler from Erzurum. She currently skips the Turkish National Women's Curling Team. Competing at the 2022 World Women's Curling Championship, she became the first ever Turkish curler to skip a men's or women's team at the World Championship.

== Career ==
=== Juniors ===
While simultaneously competing on the women's team, Yıldız skipped the national junior team from 2013 to 2018. Notably, she reached the final of the 2015 European Junior Curling Challenge, the final of two consecutive World Junior-B Curling Championships and skipped the Turkish team at three World Junior Curling Championships. Her team won only one game in both of their appearances in 2017 and 2018, however, secured three victories at the 2016 World Junior Curling Championships, defeating all three of Hungary, Japan and Russia.

=== Women's ===
Yıldız was admitted to the national team in 2012. She competed in the 2012 European Curling Championships-Group C and following her team's promotion in the European Curling Championships-Group B in Karlstad, Sweden.

Yıldız took part at the 2013 European Junior Curling Challenge-Group B in Prague, Czech Republic, which was the qualifying tournament for the 2013 World Junior Curling Championships. She skipped a 3–2 win in the round robin, failing to reach the semifinals. She ranked fifth of twelve competitors.

Yıldız competed in her first European Curling Championships in 2012 as second for the Elif Kızılkaya rink. The team finished 4–5 in the B Division, one game short of advancing to the playoff round. After losing in a tiebreaker in both 2014 and 2015, the Turkish women's team qualified for the playoffs in the B Division at the 2016 European Curling Championships, finishing second in the round robin with a 7–2 record. The team then defeated Estonia 10–2 in the semifinal before dropping the final 6–5 to Hungary. Despite the loss, the top two finish earned Turkey a spot in the A Division for the 2017 championship, the first time the country ever qualified to compete in the highest level. At the 2017 European Curling Championships, Yıldız led her Turkish squad to a 2–7 ninth-place finish, relegating Turkey back into the B Division for 2018. One of their victories, however, came against the world silver medalists team of Anna Sidorova from Russia.

Back in the B Division at the 2018 European Curling Championships, Yıldız again finished in second through the round robin with a 7–2 record. She then lost to Estonia 7–3 in the semifinal before defeating Lithuania 6–5 to earn the bronze medal. This wasn't enough, however, to advance her team into the 2019 A Division. For the first time in her career, Yıldız topped the round robin at the 2019 European Curling Championships again with a 7–2 record. This earned her team the top seed in the playoff round, where they easily defeated England 9–4 in the semifinal. This advanced her Turkish side to the final, which they would drop 5–2 to Italy's Veronica Zappone. Despite the loss, their top two finish not only earned them a berth in the A Division for 2021, but also a spot at the 2020 World Qualification Event for a chance to qualify for the 2020 World Women's Curling Championship. At the event, Yıldız led Turkey to a 4–3 round robin record, enough to earn the third playoff spot. They then faced Italy for the final berth in the World Championship. Again, however, the Italians got the best of Team Turkey, defeating them 8–4 and earning the last spot at the Women's Worlds. The Turkish team did not compete in any international events during the 2020–21 season due to the cancellation of all events because of the COVID-19 pandemic.

The 2021–22 season was a breakout season for Turkish curling, particularly Yıldız, as the nation found relative successful in the international events they attended. At the start of the season, Erzurum hosted the 2021 Pre-Olympic Qualification Event to qualify teams for the 2021 Olympic Qualification Event. In both the women's and mixed doubles disciplines, Yıldız was successful in qualifying Turkey for the Olympic Qualification Event, finishing a perfect 5–0 with partner Uğurcan Karagöz in the mixed doubles and going 5–1 to qualify her women's team. Their next event was the 2021 European Curling Championships, where Yıldız and her team competed in the A Division. Through the event, Turkey posted three victories against Denmark, Estonia and Italy, enough to finish in seventh place in the group. This seventh-place finish was enough to earn them a direct spot into the 2022 World Women's Curling Championship, the first time Turkey ever qualified for a men's or women's world championship. Next was the Olympic Qualification Event, held December 5 to 18 in Leeuwarden, Netherlands. First was the mixed doubles event, where Yıldız and her partner Uğurcan Karagöz lost all six of their matches. She then played in the women's event where she, with teammates Öznur Polat, Berfin Şengül, Ayşe Gözütok and Mihriban Polat, finished 3–5 through the round robin. Their three victories, however, came against the top three teams in the event. The team defeated the eventual Olympic gold and silver medalists Eve Muirhead and Satsuki Fujisawa, as well as the silver medalists from 2018 in Korea's Kim Eun-jung. Into the new year, Yıldız and the women's team represented Turkey at the World Championship. After losing multiple close games in extra ends, the Turkish team was able to record their first victory in World Women's Championship history against Czech Republic's Alžběta Baudyšová 7–5 in Draw 17 of the event. The team ultimately finished the event in eleventh place with a 2–10 record, recording their second victory against the Scottish team who had to withdraw before the event began.

Team Yıldız had their best European Championship to date at the 2022 European Curling Championships. After three consecutive losses, the team won five straight games which included wins over higher seeded Germany, Denmark and Norway. In their final game, they lost a narrow 8–7 match to Sweden's Anna Hasselborg, finishing in sixth place and just outside of the playoffs. As they had finished in the top eight, however, they qualified once again for the 2023 World Women's Curling Championship. There, Yıldız and her team of Öznur Polat, Mihriban Polat, Berfin Şengül and İfayet Şafak Çalıkuşu again had a slow start, going 1–4 in their first five games. They then picked up momentum, winning four of their next five games, which included wins against Japan, Korea, Germany and Denmark. Needing to win their next two games to qualify for the playoffs, they fell 10–4 to Canada, eliminating them from contention. They were able to beat Scotland in their final round robin game to finish in eighth place with an even 6–6 record in their second world championship appearance.

In preparation for the 2023 European Curling Championships, the Turkish women's team played in two tour events. After a fourth-place finish at the Sundbyberg Open, the team advanced to the final of the WCT Tallinn Ladies Challenger where they lost to Evelīna Barone. At the Europeans in Aberdeen, the team did not replicate their success from 2022, instead finishing tied for last in the group with Czechia and Germany at 2–7. However, because their two victories came against these two teams, they finished eighth overall and earned qualification into the 2024 World Women's Curling Championship for a third straight year. In the new year, the team competed in the 2024 Cortina Curling Cup where they defeated higher ranked teams such as Stefania Constantini, Marianne Rørvik and Xenia Schwaller en route to claiming Turkey's first women's World Curling Tour event title. At the World Championship, Yıldız and the team had a slow start and never recovered, finishing with a 3–9 record and tenth place overall. Notability, the team gave Canada's Rachel Homan one of their toughest games of the event. With Turkey leading by one in the tenth, Homan needed a precise runback for the victory, which she made.

=== Mixed ===
Yıldız has also competed in four World Mixed Curling Championships in 2015, 2016, 2017 and 2019. Her best finish at the event came in 2017, where she threw fourth stones for the Turkish team skipped by Alican Karataş. The team, with Semiha Konuksever and Orhun Yüce on the front end, finished the round robin with a 5–1 record. This earned them a berth in the round of sixteen, where they defeated Hungary. They then were defeated by Norway, eliminating them from the event.

=== Mixed doubles ===
Yıldız first competed at the World Mixed Doubles Curling Championship in 2016 alongside partner Kadir Çakır. After a 4–2 round robin record, the pair lost 7–5 in a qualification game to Ireland, finishing seventeenth overall. The following year, she returned with Alican Karataş. The pair had a disappointing performance, finishing 2–5 and not advancing to the knockout rounds.

The 2018 championship saw Yıldız' best finish at the event as she, along with partner Uğurcan Karagöz, finished eighth out of forty teams. Through the round robin, the pair finished with a 5–2 record. They then defeated Estonia in the round of sixteen before dropping the quarterfinal match to Canada. The team returned the following year and had another successful round robin, finishing third in their pool with a 5–2 record. However, an unfavorable draw shot challenge placed them just outside the playoff round, again finishing seventeenth.

The 2019 edition was the last with open entry as the field was reduced to just twenty teams moving forward. The top sixteen teams from the 2019 championship automatically qualified for the 2020 championship while the last four spots were decided at a qualifier. Because Turkey had finished in seventeenth, they needed to compete in the 2019 World Mixed Doubles Qualification Event to earn their spot back in the world championship. At the qualification event, Yıldız and Karagöz had an undefeated round robin record of 6–0 and defeated Austria in the first stage of the double knockout. Needing to win just one more game to qualify, the pair lost both their qualifying games to Germany and China, failing to gain back a spot in the Worlds. Because the 2020 championship was cancelled due to the COVID-19 pandemic, the same teams that had qualified instead competed in the 2021 championship, meaning Turkey had no chance to qualify.

During the 2021–22 season, Yıldız and Karagöz tried to qualify Turkey for the mixed doubles discipline of the 2022 Winter Olympics. This began at the 2021 Pre-Olympic Qualification Event where the pair went undefeated. This qualified them for the Olympic Qualification Event where they went a winless 0–6, not advancing to the Games. As the 2022 World Mixed Doubles Qualification Event was cancelled, the remaining spots were filled by the highest ranked teams on the world rankings. Because Turkey was among the next four highest ranked teams, they qualified back into the world championship. At the 2022 World Mixed Doubles Curling Championship, Yıldız teamed up with new partner Muhammed Zeki Uçan. The pair did not have a good week, finishing 1–8, automatically relegating them back to the World Mixed Doubles Qualification Event.

In December 2022, Yıldız and new partner Bilal Ömer Çakır competed at the Qualification Event. There, the pair went 4–1 in the round robin to qualify for the double knockout playoff. They won 9–7 over New Zealand in the first round before losing to Austria 9–3 in the second. This put them in the final qualifier against Finland where they stole in both the seventh and eighth ends for a 6–5 win and a berth in the World Championship. At Worlds, Yıldız and Çakır finished sixth in their group with a 4–5 record, scoring wins over Austria, England, Germany and Spain.

== Personal life ==
Yıldız is employed as a physical education and sports teacher. She studied at Fırat University. She was a member of Çelebi S.K. in Erzurum.

== Teams ==
Season	Skip	Third	Second	Lead	Alternate
2012–13	Elif Kızılkaya	Öznur Polat	Dilşat Yıldız	Ayşe Gözütok	Şeyda Zengin
2013–14	Öznur Polat	Dilşat Yıldız	Ayşe Gözütok	Elif Kızılkaya	Özlem Polat
2014–15	Öznur Polat	Dilşat Yıldız	Semiha Konuksever	Ayşe Gözütok	Özlem Polat
2015–16	Dilşat Yıldız	Öznur Polat	Semiha Konuksever	Ayşe Gözütok	
2015–16	Dilşat Yıldız	Semiha Konuksever	Berivan Polat	Mihriban Polat	
2016–17	Dilşat Yıldız	Öznur Polat	Semiha Konuksever	Ayşe Gözütok	
2016–17	Dilşat Yıldız	Canan Temuren	Beyzanur Konuksever	Beyzanur Emer	
2017–18	Dilşat Yıldız	Öznur Polat	Semiha Konuksever	Ayşe Gözütok	
2017–18	Dilşat Yıldız	Berivan Polat	Mihriban Polat	Canan Temuren	Zeynep Oztemir
2018–19	Dilşat Yıldız	Öznur Polat	Semiha Konuksever	Ozlem Polat	Beyzanur Konuksever
2019–20	Dilşat Yıldız	Öznur Polat	Semiha Konuksever	Mihriban Polat	Ozlem Polat
2021–22	Dilşat Yıldız	Öznur Polat	Berfin Şengül	Ayşe Gözütok	Mihriban Polat
2022–23	Dilşat Yıldız	Öznur Polat	İfayet Şafak Çalıkuşu	Mihriban Polat	Berfin Şengül
2023–24	Dilşat Yıldız	Öznur Polat	İfayet Şafak Çalıkuşu	Berfin Şengül	Mihriban Polat
2023–24	Dilşat Yıldız	Öznur Polat	İfayet Şafak Çalıkuşu	Berfin Şengül	İclal Karaman
2024–25	Dilşat Yıldız	Öznur Polat	İfayet Şafak Çalıkuşu	Berfin Şengül	İclal Karaman
2025–26	Dilşat Yıldız	Öznur Polat	İclal Karaman	Berfin Şengül	İfayet Şafak Çalıkuşu

== Top-level competitions ==
Representing Turkey Women's Curling Team
Competition	Venue	Win-Loss	Position
2017 European Championships	(Switzerland) St. Gallen	2-7	9th
2021 European Championships	(Norway) Lillehammer	3-6	7th
2022 World Championships	(Canada) Prince George	2-10	11th
2022 European Championships	(Sweden) Östersund	5-4	6th
2023 World Championships	(Sweden) Sandviken	6-6	8th
2023 European Championships	(Scotland) Aberdeen	2-7	8th
2024 World Championships	(Canada) Sydney	3-9	10th
2024 European Championships	(Finland) Lohja	5-4	6th
2025 World Championships	(South Korea) Uijeongbu	3-9	11th
2025 European Championships	(Finland) Lohja	5-4	6th
2026 World Championships	(Canada) Calgary	7-6	6th
2026 European Championships	(Czech Republic) Ostrava	2-3	6th
