= Ayşe Gözütok =

Turkish curler

- Curler
- Born: March 10, 1990 (age 36); Erzurum, Turkey

Team
- Curling club: Milli Piyango CA, Erzurum

Curling career
- Member Association: Turkey
- World Championship: 1 (2022)
- European Championship: 7 (2012, 2013, 2014, 2015, 2016, 2017, 2021)

Ayşe Gözütok is a Turkish curler from Erzurum, Turkey. She is the former lead of the Turkey women's national curling team.

== Career ==
In juniors, Gözütok was the alternate on the Turkey junior team that competed at the 2011 Winter Universiade. The team finished with a winless 0–9 record.

Gözütok competed in her first European Curling Championships in 2012 as lead for the Elif Kızılkaya rink. The team finished 4–5 in the B Division, one game short of advancing to the playoff round. After losing in a tiebreaker in both 2014 and 2015, the Turkish women's team qualified for the playoffs in the B Division at the 2016 European Curling Championships, finishing second in the round robin with a 7–2 record. The team then defeated Estonia 10–2 in the semifinal before dropping the final 6–5 to Hungary. Despite the loss, the top two finish earned Turkey a spot in the A Division for the 2017 championship, the first time the country ever qualified to compete in the highest level. At the 2017 European Curling Championships, Dilşat Yıldız led the Turkish squad to a 2–7 ninth-place finish, relegating Turkey back into the B Division for 2018. One of their victories, however, came against the world silver medalists team of Anna Sidorova from Russia. After the 2017–18 season, Gözütok left the national team before rejoining a few seasons later for the 2021–22 season.

The 2021–22 season was a breakout season for Turkish curling, as the nation found relative successful in the international events they attended. At the start of the season, Erzurum hosted the 2021 Pre-Olympic Qualification Event to qualify teams for the 2021 Olympic Qualification Event. In the women's event, the Turkish team succeeded in qualifying for the Olympic Qualification Event, going 5–1 through the round robin and knockout round. Their next event was the 2021 European Curling Championships, where Turkey competed in the A Division. Through the event, Turkey posted three victories against Denmark, Estonia and Italy, enough to finish in seventh place in the group. This seventh-place finish was enough to earn them a direct spot into the 2022 World Women's Curling Championship, the first time Turkey ever qualified for a men's or women's world championship. Next was the Olympic Qualification Event, held December 5 to 18 in Leeuwarden, Netherlands. Gözütok, with Yıldız, Öznur Polat, Berfin Şengül and Mihriban Polat, finished 3–5 through the round robin. Their three victories, however, came against the top three teams in the event. The team defeated the eventual Olympic gold and silver medalists Eve Muirhead and Satsuki Fujisawa, as well as the silver medalists from 2018 in Korea's Kim Eun-jung. Into the new year, Gözütok and the women's team represented Turkey at the World Championship. After losing multiple close games in extra ends, the Turkish team was able to record their first victory in World Women's Championship history against Czech Republic's Alžběta Baudyšová 7–5 in Draw 17 of the event. The team ultimately finished the event in eleventh place with a 2–10 record, recording their second victory against the Scottish team who had to withdraw before the event began.

== Personal life ==
Gözütok is employed as a teacher. She is married. She attended Atatürk University.

== Teams ==
Season	Skip	Third	Second	Lead	Alternate
2010–11	Öznur Polat	Elif Kızılkaya	Şeyda Zengin	Burcu Pehlivan	Ayşe Gözütok
2010–11	Öznur Polat	Elif Kızılkaya	Şeyda Zengin	Ayşe Gözütok	Aysun Ergin
2011–12	Öznur Polat	Elif Kızılkaya	Dilşat Yıldız	Ayşe Gözütok	Şeyda Zengin
2012–13	Elif Kızılkaya	Öznur Polat	Dilşat Yıldız	Ayşe Gözütok	Şeyda Zengin
2013–14	Elif Kızılkaya	Dilşat Yıldız	Ayşe Gözütok	Özlem Polat	Öznur Polat
2014–15	Öznur Polat	Dilşat Yıldız	Semiha Konuksever	Ayşe Gözütok	Özlem Polat
2015–16	Dilşat Yıldız	Öznur Polat	Semiha Konuksever	Ayşe Gözütok	Özlem Polat
2016–17	Dilşat Yıldız	Öznur Polat	Semiha Konuksever	Ayşe Gözütok	
2017–18	Dilşat Yıldız	Öznur Polat	Semiha Konuksever	Ayşe Gözütok	
2021–22	Dilşat Yıldız	Öznur Polat	Berfin Şengül	Ayşe Gözütok	Mihriban Polat
