= İclal Karaman =

Turkish curler

- Curler
- Born: February 23, 2003 (age 23); Erzurum, Turkey

Team
- Curling club: Milli Piyango CA, Erzurum
- Skip: Dilşat Yıldız
- Third: Öznur Polat
- Second: İclal Karaman
- Lead: Berfin Şengül
- Alternate: İfayet Şafak Çalıkuşu

Curling career
- Member Association: Turkey
- World Championship: 3 (2024, 2025, 2026)
- European Championship: 2 (2024, 2025)

İclal Karaman (born February 23, 2003) is a Turkish curler from Aziziye, Turkey. She currently plays second on the Turkey women's national curling team skipped by Dilşat Yıldız.

== Career ==
In 2022, Karaman was set to play third the Turkey women's team at the 2022 World Junior-B Curling Championships before the event was cancelled due to an outbreak of COVID-19 cases in the men's event. She threw second stones for the Turkish team at the 2022 World Junior-B Curling Championships during the 2022–23 season. The team, led by İlknur Ürüşan, finished 4–1 in the round robin and won 8–4 over Denmark in the quarterfinals. They then lost 7–2 to Scotland in the semifinal and 11–10 to Korea in the bronze medal game, finishing in fourth place and just outside of qualifying for the 2023 World Junior Curling Championships.

Karaman joined the Turkish national women's team following the 2023 European Curling Championships, replacing Mihriban Polat as alternate. As the team had finished eighth at the European championship, they qualified for the 2024 World Women's Curling Championship. In the new year, the team competed in the 2024 Cortina Curling Cup where they defeated higher ranked teams such as Stefania Constantini, Marianne Rørvik and Xenia Schwaller en route to claiming Turkey's first women's World Curling Tour event title. At the World Championship, the team had a slow start and never recovered, finishing with a 3–9 record and tenth place overall. Notability, the team gave Canada's Rachel Homan one of their toughest games of the event. With Turkey leading by one in the tenth, Homan needed a precise runback for the victory, which she made.

== Teams ==
Season	Skip	Third	Second	Lead	Alternate
2021–22	Berfin Şengül	İclal Karaman	İfayet Şafak Çalıkuşu	İlknur Ürüşan	Selenay Diler
2022–23	Berfin Şengül (Fourth)	Nilay Arzik	İclal Karaman	İlknur Ürüşan (Skip)	Nisanur Kaya
2023–24	Dilşat Yıldız	Öznur Polat	İfayet Şafak Çalıkuşu	Berfin Şengül	İclal Karaman
2023–24	Berfin Şengül (Fourth)	İfayet Şafak Çalıkuşu	İclal Karaman	İlknur Ürüşan (Skip)	Melisa Cömert
2024–25	Dilşat Yıldız	Öznur Polat	İfayet Şafak Çalıkuşu	Berfin Şengül	İclal Karaman
2025–26	Dilşat Yıldız	Öznur Polat	İclal Karaman	Berfin Şengül	İfayet Şafak Çalıkuşu
