= Berfin Şengül =

Turkish curler

- Curler
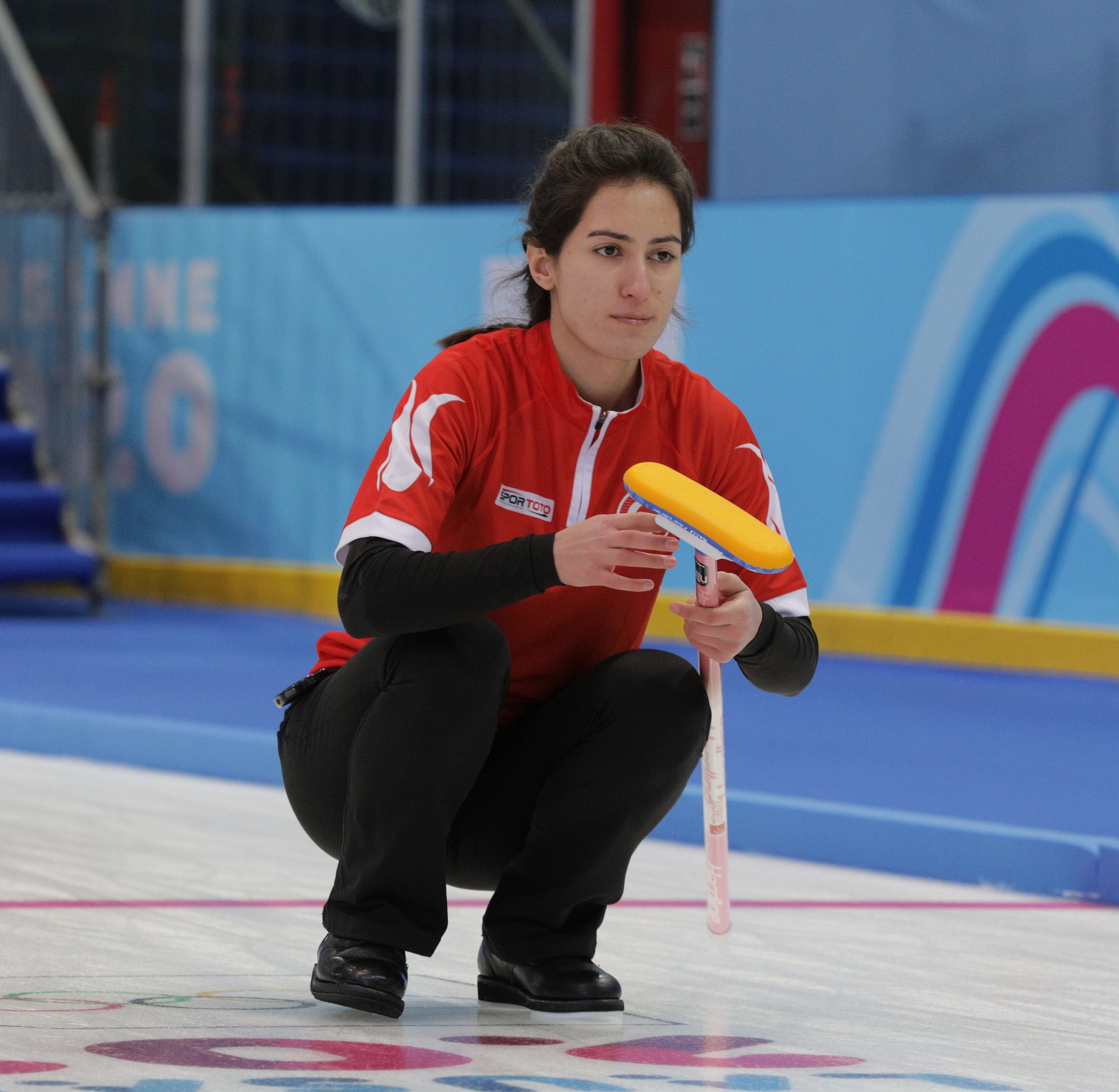
- Şengül at the 2020 Winter Youth Olympics
- Born: 20 August 2002 (age 24); Erzincan, Turkey

Team
- Curling club: Milli Piyango CA, Erzurum
- Skip: Dilşat Yıldız
- Third: Berfin Şengül
- Second: Melisa Cömert
- Lead: Seydanur Morkoç
- Alternate: Şüheda Karacalı

Curling career
- Member Association: Turkey
- World Championship: 5 (2022, 2023, 2024, 2025, 2026)
- European Championship: 6 (2021, 2022, 2023, 2024, 2025, 2026)

Berfin Şengül (born 20 August 2002) is a Turkish curler from Erzincan, Turkey. She currently plays lead on the Turkey women's national curling team skipped by Dilşat Yıldız.

== Career ==
Şengül played third on the Turkish team that represented the nation at the 2020 Winter Youth Olympics in Champéry, Switzerland. Her team, with skip Selahattin Eser, fourth Kadir Polat and lead İfayet Şafak Çalıkuşu finished 2–3 through the round robin, not enough to advance to the playoff round. She then competed with Olle Moberg of Sweden in the mixed doubles event. The pair won their first game, before losing in the round of twenty-four, eliminating them from contention.

In 2022, she was set to skip the Turkey women's junior team at the 2022 World Junior-B Curling Championships before the event was cancelled due to an outbreak of COVID-19 cases in the men's event. She threw fourth stones for the Turkish team at the 2022 World Junior-B Curling Championships during the 2022–23 season. The team, led by İlknur Ürüşan, finished 4–1 in the round robin and won 8–4 over Denmark in the quarterfinals. They then lost 7–2 to Scotland in the semifinal and 11–10 to Korea in the bronze medal game, finishing in fourth place and just outside of qualifying for the 2023 World Junior Curling Championships. Şengül was added to the Turkey women's national curling team for the 2021–22 season.

The 2021–22 season was a breakout season for Turkish curling, as the nation found relative successful in the international events they attended. At the start of the season, Erzurum hosted the 2021 Pre-Olympic Qualification Event to qualify teams for the 2021 Olympic Qualification Event. In the women's event, the Turkish team succeeded in qualifying for the Olympic Qualification Event, going 5–1 through the round robin and knockout round. Their next event was the 2021 European Curling Championships, where Turkey competed in the A Division. Through the event, Turkey posted three victories against Denmark, Estonia and Italy, enough to finish in seventh place in the group. This seventh-place finish was enough to earn them a direct spot into the 2022 World Women's Curling Championship, the first time Turkey ever qualified for a men's or women's world championship. Next was the Olympic Qualification Event, held from 5 to 18 December in Leeuwarden, Netherlands. Şengül, with teammates Dilşat Yıldız, Öznur Polat, Ayşe Gözütok and Mihriban Polat, finished 3–5 through the round robin. Their three victories, however, came against the top three teams in the event. The team defeated the eventual Olympic gold and silver medalists Eve Muirhead and Satsuki Fujisawa, as well as the silver medalists from 2018 in Korea's Kim Eun-jung. Into the new year, Şengül and the women's team represented Turkey at the World Championship. After losing multiple close games in extra ends, the Turkish team was able to record their first victory in World Women's Championship history against Czech Republic's Alžběta Baudyšová 7–5 in Draw 17 of the event. The team ultimately finished the event in eleventh place with a 2–10 record, recording their second victory against the Scottish team who had to withdraw before the event began.

Team Yıldız had their best European Championship to date at the 2022 European Curling Championships. After three consecutive losses, the team won five straight games which included wins over higher seeded Germany, Denmark and Norway. In their final game, they lost a narrow 8–7 match to Sweden's Anna Hasselborg, finishing in sixth place and just outside of the playoffs. As they had finished in the top eight, however, they qualified once again for the 2023 World Women's Curling Championship. There, the team of Dilşat Yıldız, Öznur Polat, Mihriban Polat, Şengül and İfayet Şafak Çalıkuşu again had a slow start, going 1–4 in their first five games. They then picked up momentum, winning four of their next five games, which included wins against Japan, Korea, Germany and Denmark. Needing to win their next two games to qualify for the playoffs, they fell 10–4 to Canada, eliminating them from contention. They were able to beat Scotland in their final round robin game to finish in eighth place with an even 6–6 record in their second world championship appearance.

In preparation for the 2023 European Curling Championships, the Turkish women's team played in two tour events. After a fourth-place finish at the Sundbyberg Open, the team advanced to the final of the WCT Tallinn Ladies Challenger where they lost to Evelīna Barone. At the Europeans in Aberdeen, the team did not replicate their success from 2022, instead finishing tied for last in the group with Czechia and Germany at 2–7. However, because their two victories came against these two teams, they finished eighth overall and earned qualification into the 2024 World Women's Curling Championship for a third straight year. In the new year, the team competed in the 2024 Cortina Curling Cup where they defeated higher ranked teams such as Stefania Constantini, Marianne Rørvik and Xenia Schwaller en route to claiming Turkey's first women's World Curling Tour event title. At the World Championship, the team had a slow start and never recovered, finishing with a 3–9 record and tenth place overall. Notability, the team gave Canada's Rachel Homan one of their toughest games of the event. With Turkey leading by one in the tenth, Homan needed a precise runback for the victory, which she made.

== Personal life ==
Şengül is currently a student athlete.

== Teams ==
Season	Skip	Third	Second	Lead	Alternate
2021–22	Dilşat Yıldız	Öznur Polat	Berfin Şengül	Ayşe Gözütok	Mihriban Polat
2021–22	Berfin Şengül	İclal Karaman	İfayet Şafak Çalıkuşu	İlknur Ürüşan	Selenay Diler
2022–23	Dilşat Yıldız	Öznur Polat	İfayet Şafak Çalıkuşu	Mihriban Polat	Berfin Şengül
2023–24	Dilşat Yıldız	Öznur Polat	İfayet Şafak Çalıkuşu	Berfin Şengül	Mihriban Polat
2023–24	Dilşat Yıldız	Öznur Polat	İfayet Şafak Çalıkuşu	Berfin Şengül	İclal Karaman
2023–24	Berfin Şengül (Fourth)	İfayet Şafak Çalıkuşu	İclal Karaman	İlknur Ürüşan (Skip)	Melisa Cömert
2024–25	Dilşat Yıldız	Öznur Polat	İfayet Şafak Çalıkuşu	Berfin Şengül	İclal Karaman
2025–26	Dilşat Yıldız	Öznur Polat	İclal Karaman	Berfin Şengül	İfayet Şafak Çalıkuşu
