= Öznur Polat =

Turkish female curler and coach (born 1987)

- Curler ♀
- Born: 12 December 1987 (age 38); Erzurum, Turkey

Team
- Curling club: Milli Piyango CA, Erzurum
- Skip: Dilşat Yıldız
- Third: Öznur Polat
- Second: İclal Karaman
- Lead: Berfin Şengül
- Alternate: İfayet Şafak Çalıkuşu

Curling career
- Member Association: Turkey
- World Championship: 5 (2022, 2023, 2024, 2025, 2026)
- World Mixed Doubles Championship: 1 (2015)
- European Championship: 14 (2010, 2012, 2013, 2014, 2015, 2016, 2017, 2018, 2019, 2021, 2022, 2023, 2024, 2025)

Öznur Polat (born 12 December 1987) is a Turkish curler and curling coach. She currently plays third on the Turkey women's national curling team skipped by Dilşat Yıldız.

== Career ==
Polat was admitted to the Turkey women's junior team in 2010, while still in juniors. At the junior level, she skipped the Turkish team to a winless 0–9 record at the 2011 Winter Universiade. She fared well in the European C Division from 2010 to 2012, qualifying Turkey into the B Division in both 2010 and 2012. She took over as skip of the team from 2013 to 2015, before Dilşat Yıldız took over skipping duties for the team, moving Polat to third.

After losing in a tiebreaker in both 2014 and 2015, the Turkish women's team qualified for the playoffs in the B Division at the 2016 European Curling Championships, finishing second in the round robin with a 7–2 record. The team then defeated Estonia 10–2 in the semifinal before dropping the final 6–5 to Hungary. Despite the loss, the top two finish earned Turkey a spot in the A Division for the 2017 championship, the first time the country ever qualified to compete in the highest level. At the 2017 European Curling Championships, the Turkish squad finished in ninth with a 2–7 record, relegating Turkey back into the B Division for 2018. One of their victories, however, came against the world silver medalists team of Anna Sidorova from Russia.

Back in the B Division at the 2018 European Curling Championships, Turkey again finished in second through the round robin with a 7–2 record. They then lost to Estonia 7–3 in the semifinal before defeating Lithuania 6–5 to earn the bronze medal. This wasn't enough, however, to advance her team into the 2019 A Division. For the first time in their careers, Team Turkey topped the round robin at the 2019 European Curling Championships again with a 7–2 record. This earned them the top seed in the playoff round, where they easily defeated England 9–4 in the semifinal. This advanced the Turkish side to the final, which they would drop 5–2 to Italy's Veronica Zappone. Despite the loss, their top two finish not only earned them a berth in the A Division for 2021, but also a spot at the 2020 World Qualification Event for a chance to qualify for the 2020 World Women's Curling Championship. At the event, Yıldız led Turkey to a 4–3 round robin record, enough to earn the third playoff spot. They then faced Italy for the final berth in the World Championship. Again, however, the Italians got the best of Team Turkey, defeating them 8–4 and earning the last spot at the Women's Worlds. The Turkish team did not compete in any international events during the 2020–21 season due to the cancellation of all events because of the COVID-19 pandemic.

The 2021–22 season was a breakout season for Turkish curling, as the nation found relative successful in the international events they attended. At the start of the season, Erzurum hosted the 2021 Pre-Olympic Qualification Event to qualify teams for the 2021 Olympic Qualification Event. In the women's event, the Turkish team succeeded in qualifying for the Olympic Qualification Event, going 5–1 through the round robin and knockout round. Their next event was the 2021 European Curling Championships, where Turkey competed in the A Division. Through the event, Turkey posted three victories against Denmark, Estonia and Italy, enough to finish in seventh place in the group. This seventh-place finish was enough to earn them a direct spot into the 2022 World Women's Curling Championship, the first time Turkey ever qualified for a men's or women's world championship. Next was the Olympic Qualification Event, held December 5 to 18 in Leeuwarden, Netherlands. Polat, with Yıldız, Berfin Şengül, Ayşe Gözütok and Mihriban Polat, finished 3–5 through the round robin. Their three victories, however, came against the top three teams in the event. The team defeated the eventual Olympic gold and silver medalists Eve Muirhead and Satsuki Fujisawa, as well as the silver medalists from 2018 in Korea's Kim Eun-jung. Into the new year, Polat and the women's team represented Turkey at the World Championship. After losing multiple close games in extra ends, the Turkish team was able to record their first victory in World Women's Championship history against Czech Republic's Alžběta Baudyšová 7–5 in Draw 17 of the event. The team ultimately finished the event in eleventh place with a 2–10 record, recording their second victory against the Scottish team who had to withdraw before the event began.

Team Yıldız had their best European Championship to date at the 2022 European Curling Championships. After three consecutive losses, the team won five straight games which included wins over higher seeded Germany, Denmark and Norway. In their final game, they lost a narrow 8–7 match to Sweden's Anna Hasselborg, finishing in sixth place and just outside of the playoffs. As they had finished in the top eight, however, they qualified once again for the 2023 World Women's Curling Championship. There, the team of Dilşat Yıldız, Polat, Mihriban Polat, Berfin Şengül and İfayet Şafak Çalıkuşu again had a slow start, going 1–4 in their first five games. They then picked up momentum, winning four of their next five games, which included wins against Japan, Korea, Germany and Denmark. Needing to win their next two games to qualify for the playoffs, they fell 10–4 to Canada, eliminating them from contention. They were able to beat Scotland in their final round robin game to finish in eighth place with an even 6–6 record in their second world championship appearance.

In preparation for the 2023 European Curling Championships, the Turkish women's team played in two tour events. After a fourth-place finish at the Sundbyberg Open, the team advanced to the final of the WCT Tallinn Ladies Challenger where they lost to Evelīna Barone. At the Europeans in Aberdeen, the team did not replicate their success from 2022, instead finishing tied for last in the group with Czechia and Germany at 2–7. However, because their two victories came against these two teams, they finished eighth overall and earned qualification into the 2024 World Women's Curling Championship for a third straight year. In the new year, the team competed in the 2024 Cortina Curling Cup where they defeated higher ranked teams such as Stefania Constantini, Marianne Rørvik and Xenia Schwaller en route to claiming Turkey's first women's World Curling Tour event title. At the World Championship, the team had a slow start and never recovered, finishing with a 3–9 record and tenth place overall. Notability, the team gave Canada's Rachel Homan one of their toughest games of the event. With Turkey leading by one in the tenth, Homan needed a precise runback for the victory, which she made.

In 2015, Polat represented Turkey at the 2015 World Mixed Doubles Curling Championship with partner Kadir Çakır. After splitting their opening six games with three wins and three losses, the pair lost their final three round robin games. This placed them eighth in their pool with a 3–6 record, and twenty-second overall in the thirty team event. She has also competed in three World Mixed Curling Championship's in 2016, 2018 and 2019. Her best finish at the event came in 2018, where she skipped the Turkish team of Bilal Ömer Çakır, Oğuzhan Karakurt and Semiha Konuksever to a 6–2 round robin record, enough to qualify for the playoff round. They then stole a victory against Denmark in the qualification game before dropping the semifinal to Russia, the eventual bronze medalists from the event.

== Personal life ==
Polat is employed as a physical education and sports teacher. She attended Atatürk University.

== Teams ==
=== Women's ===
Season	Skip	Third	Second	Lead	Alternate
2010–11	Aysun Ergin	Öznur Polat	Şeyda Zengin	Elif Kızılkaya	Burcu Pehlivan
2010–11	Öznur Polat	Elif Kızılkaya	Şeyda Zengin	Burcu Pehlivan	Ayşe Gözütok
2012–13	Elif Kızılkaya	Öznur Polat	Dilşat Yıldız	Ayşe Gözütok	Şeyda Zengin
2013–14	Öznur Polat	Dilşat Yıldız	Ayşe Gözütok	Elif Kızılkaya	Özlem Polat
2014–15	Öznur Polat	Dilşat Yıldız	Semiha Konuksever	Ayşe Gözütok	Özlem Polat
2015–16	Dilşat Yıldız	Öznur Polat	Semiha Konuksever	Ayşe Gözütok	
2016–17	Dilşat Yıldız	Öznur Polat	Semiha Konuksever	Ayşe Gözütok	
2017–18	Dilşat Yıldız	Öznur Polat	Semiha Konuksever	Ayşe Gözütok	
2018–19	Dilşat Yıldız	Öznur Polat	Semiha Konuksever	Ozlem Polat	Beyzanur Konuksever
2019–20	Dilşat Yıldız	Öznur Polat	Semiha Konuksever	Mihriban Polat	Ozlem Polat
2021–22	Dilşat Yıldız	Öznur Polat	Berfin Şengül	Ayşe Gözütok	Mihriban Polat
2022–23	Dilşat Yıldız	Öznur Polat	İfayet Şafak Çalıkuşu	Mihriban Polat	Berfin Şengül
2023–24	Dilşat Yıldız	Öznur Polat	İfayet Şafak Çalıkuşu	Berfin Şengül	Mihriban Polat
2023–24	Dilşat Yıldız	Öznur Polat	İfayet Şafak Çalıkuşu	Berfin Şengül	İclal Karaman
2024–25	Dilşat Yıldız	Öznur Polat	İfayet Şafak Çalıkuşu	Berfin Şengül	İclal Karaman
2025–26	Dilşat Yıldız	Öznur Polat	İclal Karaman	Berfin Şengül	İfayet Şafak Çalıkuşu

=== Mixed ===
Season	Skip	Third	Second	Lead	Alternate
2010–11	Ilhan Osmanagaoglu	Aysun Ergin	Tugrul Sinasi Sahiner	Öznur Polat	Ali Osman Sahin, Şeyda Zengin
2011–12	Öznur Polat	Ilhan Osmanagaoglu	Ayşe Gözütok	Yusuf Bayraktutan	Aysun Ergin, Muhammet Oğuz Zengin
2012–13	Murat Sagir	Elif Kızılkaya	Ahmet Uysal	Öznur Polat	Muhammet Oğuz Zengin
2013–14	Alican Karataş	Elif Kızılkaya	Muhammet Oğuz Zengin	Öznur Polat	
2014–15	Kadir Çakır	Öznur Polat	Melik Şenol	Ayşe Gözütok	
2016–17	Alican Karataş	Öznur Polat	Uğurcan Karagöz	Dilşat Yıldız	
2018–19	Bilal Omer Cakir (Fourth)	Öznur Polat (Skip)	Oğuzhan Karakurt	Semiha Konuksever	
2019–20	Dilşat Yıldız	Uğurcan Karagöz	Öznur Polat	Alican Karataş	

=== Mixed doubles ===
Season	Female	Male
2014–15	Öznur Polat	Kadir Çakır

== Record as a coach of national teams ==
Year	Tournament, event	National team	Place
2017	2017 World Junior Curling Championships	Turkey (junior women)	10

== Top-level competitions ==
Representing Turkey Women's Curling Team
Competition	Venue	Win-Loss	Position
2011 Winter Universiade	(Turkey) Erzurum	0-9	10th
2017 European Championships	(Switzerland) St. Gallen	2-7	9th
2021 European Championships	(Norway) Lillehammer	3-6	7th
2022 World Championships	(Canada) Prince George	2-10	11th
2022 European Championships	(Sweden) Östersund	5-4	6th
2023 World Championships	(Sweden) Sandviken	6-6	8th
2023 European Championships	(Scotland) Aberdeen	2-7	8th
2024 World Championships	(Canada) Sydney	3-9	10th
2024 European Championships	(Finland) Lohja	5-4	6th
2025 World Championships	(South Korea) Uijeongbu	3-9	11th
2025 European Championships	(Finland) Lohja	5-4	6th
2026 World Championships	(Canada) Calgary	7-6	6th
