= 2021 Pre-Olympic Qualification Event =

Qualifier for 2022 Winter Olympics

- Host city: Erzurum, Turkey
- Arena: Milli Piyango Curling Arena
- Dates: October 5–15, 2021
- Men's qualifiers: Czech Republic; Finland
- Women's qualifiers: Latvia; Turkey
- Mixed doubles qualifiers: Latvia; Turkey; Denmark

The Pre-Olympic qualification event in curling was held from October 5–15, 2021, in Erzurum, Turkey. It was the last chance for National Olympic Committees to qualify for the Olympic qualification event. For mixed doubles three nations qualified for the Olympic qualification event. For the other two disciplines, men's and women's, two nations qualified for the Olympic qualification event. Latvia, Turkey and Denmark qualified in the mixed doubles; the Czech Republic and Finland qualified in men's; and Latvia and Turkey qualified in the women's.

== Mixed doubles ==
=== Teams ===
Austria	Belarus	Belgium	Brazil
Female: Hannah Augustin; Male: Martin Reichel	Female: Tatsiana Tarsunova; Male: Vitali Burmistrau	Female: Veerle Geerinckx; Male: Dirk Heylen	Female: Anne Shibuya; Male: Scott McMullan
Chinese Taipei	Denmark	Kazakhstan	Kyrgyzstan
Female: Amanda Chou; Male: Brendon Liu	Female: Jasmin Lander; Male: Henrik Holtermann	Female: Angelina Ebauyer; Male: Madiyar Korabayev	Female: Anastasiia Frolova; Male: Ivan Osolodkov
Latvia	Lithuania	Mexico	Nigeria
Female: Daina Barone; Male: Arnis Veidemanis	Female: Akvilė Rykovė; Male: Konstantin Rykov	Female: Estefana Quintero; Male: Ismael Abreu	Female: Susana Cole; Male: Tijani Cole
Portugal	Slovakia	Slovenia	Turkey
Female: April Gale-Seixeiro; Male: Steve Seixeiro	Female: Daniela Matulová; Male: Juraj Gallo	Female: Andreja Prislan; Male: Marko Bilčar	Female: Dilşat Yıldız; Male: Uğurcan Karagöz

=== Round-robin standings ===
Final round-robin standings

Key
Teams to Playoffs (Top 3 in each group)

Group A	W	L	W–L	DSC
Latvia	5	0	–	105.51
Belarus	3	2	–	58.41
Portugal	2	3	1–1	47.93
Kyrgyzstan	2	3	1–1	74.51
Lithuania	2	3	1–1	113.64
Slovakia	1	4	–	91.47

Group B	W	L	W–L	DSC
Turkey	4	0	–	24.97
Kazakhstan	3	1	–	136.59
Brazil	2	2	–	69.99
Nigeria	1	3	–	115.41
Slovenia	0	4	–	94.44

Group C	W	L	W–L	DSC
Denmark	4	0	–	33.53
Chinese Taipei	3	1	–	44.04
Austria	2	2	–	68.00
Mexico	1	3	–	40.10
Belgium	0	4	–	102.06

Group A Round Robin Summary Table
Pos.	Country	Belarus	Kyrgyzstan	Latvia	Lithuania	Portugal	Slovakia	Record
2	Belarus	—	6–8	4–13	9–4	8–5	6–4	3–2
4	Kyrgyzstan	8–6	—	L–W	9–8	5–6	7–8	2–3
1	Latvia	13–4	W–L	—	7–4	8–7	6–3	5–0
5	Lithuania	4–9	8–9	4–7	—	10–6	10–4	2–3
3	Portugal	5–8	6–5	7–8	6–10	—	12–1	2–3
6	Slovakia	4–6	8–7	3–6	4–10	1–12	—	1–4

Group B Round Robin Summary Table
Pos.	Country	Brazil	Kazakhstan	Nigeria	Slovenia	Turkey	Record
3	Brazil	—	4–10	8–1	7–5	3–12	2–2
2	Kazakhstan	10–4	—	8–7	10–3	8–9	3–1
4	Nigeria	1–8	7–8	—	11–10	0–14	1–3
5	Slovenia	5–7	3–10	10–11	—	1–12	0–4
1	Turkey	12–3	9–8	14–0	12–1	—	4–0

Group C Round Robin Summary Table
Pos.	Country	Austria	Belgium	Chinese Taipei	Denmark	Mexico	Record
3	Austria	—	9–4	2–10	2–11	5–2	2–2
5	Belgium	4–9	—	5–9	7–8	3–8	0–4
2	Chinese Taipei	10–2	9–5	—	3–11	9–1	3–1
1	Denmark	11–2	8–7	11–3	—	12–3	4–0
4	Mexico	2–5	8–3	1–9	3–12	—	1–3

=== Round-robin results ===
All draw times are listed in Turkey Time (UTC+03:00).

==== Draw 1 ====
Tuesday, October 5, 9:00

Sheet C	1	2	3	4	5	6	7	8	Final
Denmark	4	0	3	3	0	2	0	X	12
Mexico	0	1	0	0	1	0	1	X	3

Sheet D	1	2	3	4	5	6	7	8	Final
Kazakhstan	1	3	0	1	1	3	1	X	10
Brazil	0	0	4	0	0	0	0	X	4

==== Draw 2 ====
Tuesday, October 5, 14:00

Sheet B	1	2	3	4	5	6	7	8	Final
Kyrgyzstan	1	0	0	0	1	0	3	0	5
Portugal	0	1	1	1	0	1	0	2	6

Sheet C	1	2	3	4	5	6	7	8	Final
Belarus	0	0	2	0	2	0	X	X	4
Latvia	4	1	0	5	0	3	X	X	13

Sheet D	1	2	3	4	5	6	7	8	Final
Slovakia	1	0	1	0	2	0	0	X	4
Lithuania	0	2	0	3	0	2	3	X	10

==== Draw 3 ====
Tuesday, October 5, 19:00

Sheet A	1	2	3	4	5	6	7	8	Final
Slovenia	0	1	0	0	0	0	0	X	1
Turkey	4	0	4	1	1	1	1	X	12

Sheet B	1	2	3	4	5	6	7	8	9	Final
Nigeria	0	0	0	2	2	0	1	2	0	7
Kazakhstan	1	3	1	0	0	2	0	0	1	8

Sheet C	1	2	3	4	5	6	7	8	Final
Austria	0	2	0	0	0	0	X	X	2
Chinese Taipei	2	0	4	1	1	2	X	X	10

Sheet D	1	2	3	4	5	6	7	8	Final
Denmark	0	1	0	0	5	0	0	2	8
Belgium	1	0	2	1	0	2	1	0	7

==== Draw 4 ====
Wednesday, October 6, 9:00

Sheet A	1	2	3	4	5	6	7	8	Final
Kyrgyzstan	0	1	0	3	1	0	2	0	7
Slovakia	1	0	3	0	0	3	0	1	8

Sheet B	1	2	3	4	5	6	7	8	Final
Chinese Taipei	3	2	0	0	0	4	0	X	9
Belgium	0	0	1	2	1	0	1	X	5

Sheet C	1	2	3	4	5	6	7	8	Final
Slovenia	0	5	1	0	4	0	0	0	10
Nigeria	1	0	0	2	0	3	4	1	11

Sheet D	1	2	3	4	5	6	7	8	Final
Portugal	2	0	0	0	3	1	1	0	7
Latvia	0	1	4	1	0	0	0	2	8

Sheet E	1	2	3	4	5	6	7	8	Final
Lithuania	0	0	0	0	3	0	1	X	4
Belarus	4	1	1	1	0	2	0	X	9

==== Draw 5 ====
Wednesday, October 6, 14:00

Sheet B	1	2	3	4	5	6	7	8	Final
Turkey	3	2	3	0	3	0	1	X	12
Brazil	0	0	0	2	0	1	0	X	3

Sheet E	1	2	3	4	5	6	7	8	Final
Kazakhstan	5	2	1	2	0	0	0	X	10
Slovenia	0	0	0	0	1	1	1	X	3

==== Draw 6 ====
Wednesday, October 6, 19:00

Sheet A	1	2	3	4	5	6	7	8	Final
Lithuania	1	0	1	0	0	2	0	0	4
Latvia	0	2	0	2	1	0	1	1	7

Sheet B	1	2	3	4	5	6	7	8	Final
Belgium	0	0	1	0	1	0	1	X	3
Mexico	2	2	0	2	0	2	0	X	8

Sheet C	1	2	3	4	5	6	7	8	Final
Kyrgyzstan	0	0	0	2	0	3	2	1	8
Belarus	1	1	3	0	1	0	0	0	6

Sheet D	1	2	3	4	5	6	7	8	Final
Austria	0	0	2	0	0	0	0	X	2
Denmark	4	1	0	1	2	2	1	X	11

Sheet E	1	2	3	4	5	6	7	8	Final
Slovakia	0	0	1	0	0	0	X	X	1
Portugal	5	1	0	2	1	3	X	X	12

==== Draw 7 ====
Thursday, October 7, 9:00

Sheet A	1	2	3	4	5	6	7	8	Final
Mexico	0	0	1	0	0	0	1	X	2
Austria	1	1	0	1	1	1	0	X	5

Sheet B	1	2	3	4	5	6	7	8	Final
Portugal	2	0	0	1	0	1	1	0	5
Belarus	0	2	2	0	1	0	0	3	8

Sheet C	1	2	3	4	5	6	7	8	Final
Latvia	0	1	2	0	2	1	0	X	6
Slovakia	1	0	0	1	0	0	1	X	3

Sheet D	1	2	3	4	5	6	7	8	Final
Lithuania	0	1	0	0	3	0	4	0	8
Kyrgyzstan	1	0	2	2	0	1	0	3	9

Sheet E	1	2	3	4	5	6	7	8	Final
Chinese Taipei	0	0	0	0	3	0	X	X	3
Denmark	5	1	3	1	0	1	X	X	11

==== Draw 8 ====
Thursday, October 7, 14:00

Sheet B	1	2	3	4	5	6	7	8	Final
Mexico	1	0	0	0	0	0	0	X	1
Chinese Taipei	0	2	1	1	1	3	1	X	9

Sheet C	1	2	3	4	5	6	7	8	Final
Brazil	0	0	0	0	3	1	0	2	7
Slovenia	1	0	1	2	0	0	1	0	5

Sheet D	1	2	3	4	5	6	7	8	Final
Nigeria	0	0	0	0	0	0	X	X	0
Turkey	2	2	2	1	3	4	X	X	14

Sheet E	1	2	3	4	5	6	7	8	Final
Belgium	0	0	1	0	2	0	1	X	4
Austria	1	1	0	2	0	5	0	X	9

==== Draw 9 ====
Thursday, October 7, 19:00

Sheet A	1	2	3	4	5	6	7	8	Final
Brazil	1	2	0	1	1	2	1	X	8
Nigeria	0	0	1	0	0	0	0	X	1

Sheet B	1	2	3	4	5	6	7	8	Final
Latvia	0	1	0	1	3	0	2	0	W
Kyrgyzstan	1	0	1	0	0	2	0	/	L

Sheet C	1	2	3	4	5	6	7	8	Final
Portugal	1	0	1	0	3	0	1	X	6
Lithuania	0	3	0	4	0	3	0	X	10

Sheet D	1	2	3	4	5	6	7	8	Final
Belarus	1	1	0	2	0	1	0	1	6
Slovakia	0	0	1	0	2	0	1	0	4

Sheet E	1	2	3	4	5	6	7	8	Final
Turkey	0	3	0	1	0	2	0	3	9
Kazakhstan	1	0	3	0	1	0	3	0	8

- The team from Kyrgyzstan ran out of time in the eighth end, and therefore forfeited the game.

=== Playoffs ===
Qualification Semifinals
B2	Kazakhstan	6
C3	Austria	5
C2	Chinese Taipei	7
A3	Portugal	8
A2	Belarus	8
B3	Brazil	2

Qualification Finals
A1	Latvia	9
B2	Kazakhstan	6
B1	Turkey	8
A3	Portugal	7
C1	Denmark	7
A2	Belarus	5

==== Qualification Semifinal Game 1 ====
Friday, October 8, 9:00

Sheet C	1	2	3	4	5	6	7	8	Final
Kazakhstan	1	1	1	0	2	0	0	1	6
Austria	0	0	0	2	0	1	2	0	5

==== Qualification Semifinal Game 2 ====
Friday, October 8, 9:00

Sheet D	1	2	3	4	5	6	7	8	Final
Chinese Taipei	0	1	0	1	0	0	5	0	7
Portugal	2	0	1	0	1	1	0	3	8

==== Qualification Semifinal Game 3 ====
Friday, October 8, 9:00

Sheet B	1	2	3	4	5	6	7	8	Final
Belarus	3	0	1	1	1	0	2	X	8
Brazil	0	1	0	0	0	1	0	X	2

==== Qualification Game 1 ====
Friday, October 8, 15:00

Sheet D	1	2	3	4	5	6	7	8	Final
Latvia	3	0	2	1	0	3	0	X	9
Kazakhstan	0	3	0	0	2	0	1	X	6

==== Qualification Game 2 ====
Friday, October 8, 15:00

Sheet B	1	2	3	4	5	6	7	8	Final
Turkey	2	0	2	0	0	2	0	2	8
Portugal	0	1	0	3	1	0	2	0	7

==== Qualification Game 3 ====
Friday, October 8, 15:00

Sheet C	1	2	3	4	5	6	7	8	Final
Denmark	2	1	0	2	0	2	0	X	7
Belarus	0	0	1	0	2	0	2	X	5

== Men ==
=== Teams ===
Austria	Belgium	Brazil	Chinese Taipei	Czech Republic
Fourth: Jonas Backofen; Third: Matthäus Hofer; Skip: Gernot Higatzberger; Lead: Moritz Jöchl; Alternate: Johann Karg	Fourth: Tom van Waterschoot; Third: Jeroen Spruyt; Skip: Timo Verreycken; Lead: Bram Van Looy	Skip: Michael Kraehenbuehl; Third: Scott McMullan; Second: Sergio Mitsuo Vilela; Lead: Claudio Alves	Skip: Lin Ting-Li; Third: Wang Nelson; Second: Yin Liu Luis; Lead: Cheng Kai-wen	Skip: Lukáš Klíma; Third: Marek Černovský; Second: Jiří Candra; Lead: Samuel Mokriš; Alternate: Radek Boháč
Estonia	Finland	Hungary	Kazakhstan	Kyrgyzstan
Fourth: Mihhail Vlassov; Skip: Eduard Veltsman; Second: Janis Kiziridi; Lead: Igor Dzendzeljuk	Skip: Kalle Kiiskinen; Third: Teemu Salo; Second: Leo Ouni; Lead: Paavo Kuosmanen; Alternate: Jermu Pöllänen	Skip: Kristóf Czermann; Third: Lőrinc Tatár; Second: Ottó Kalocsay; Lead: Callum MacFarlane; Alternate: Dávid Balázs	Skip: Madiyar Korabayev; Third: Adil Zhumagozha; Second: Aidos Alliyar; Lead: Dmitriy Garagul; Alternate: Georgiy Skupnevskiy	Skip: Danil Dmitriev; Third: Ivan Osolodkov; Second: Aibek Asanaliev; Lead: Muhamed Dasifu
Latvia	Nigeria	Romania	Slovakia	Slovenia
Skip: Krišs Vonda; Third: Jānis Vonda; Second: Roberts Buncis; Lead: Didzis Pētersons; Alternate: Ričards Vonda	Skip: Harold Woods III; Third: Tijani Cole; Second: Chris Neimeth; Lead: Robert Payne	Skip: Valentin Anghelinei; Third: Razvan Bouleanu; Second: Cezar Postelnicu; Lead: Marius Mazilu	Fourth: Jakub Červenka; Skip: Juraj Gallo; Second: Tomáš Pitoňák; Lead: Peter Pitoňák	Skip: Štefan Sever; Third: Simon Langus; Second: Bine Sever; Lead: Jakob Omerzel; Alternate: Gaber Bor Zelinka
Spain	Turkey			
Skip: Sergio Vez; Third: Mikel Unanue; Second: Eduard de Paz; Lead: Nicholas Shaw; Alternate: Luis Gómez	Skip: Uğurcan Karagöz; Third: Oğuzhan Karakurt; Second: Muhammed Zeki Uçan; Lead: Orhun Yüce; Alternate: Muhammet Haydar Demirel			

=== Round-robin standings ===
Final round-robin standings

Key
Teams to Playoffs (Top 2 in each group)

Group A	Skip	W	L	W–L	DSC
Turkey	Uğurcan Karagöz	4	0	–	34.86
Kyrgyzstan	Danil Dmitriev	3	1	–	91.31
Kazakhstan	Madiyar Korabayev	2	2	–	44.96
Chinese Taipei	Lin Ting-Li	1	3	–	60.37
Brazil	Michael Kraehenbuehl	0	4	–	102.04

Group B	Skip	W	L	W–L	DSC
Finland	Kalle Kiiskinen	5	0	–	34.63
Czech Republic	Lukáš Klíma	4	1	–	59.40
Hungary	Kristóf Czermann	3	2	–	78.76
Austria	Gernot Higatzberger	2	3	–	41.56
Slovenia	Štefan Sever	1	4	–	63.87
Nigeria	Harold Woods III	0	5	–	132.84

Group C	Skip	W	L	W–L	DSC
Spain	Sergio Vez	5	0	–	29.70
Belgium	Timo Verreycken	3	2	1–0	65.63
Estonia	Eduard Veltsman	3	2	0–1	41.94
Latvia	Krišs Vonda	2	3	1–0	42.71
Slovakia	Juraj Gallo	2	3	0–1	88.76
Romania	Valentin Anghelinei	0	5	–	94.63

Group A Round Robin Summary Table
Pos.	Country	Brazil	Chinese Taipei	Kazakhstan	Kyrgyzstan	Turkey	Record
5	Brazil	—	2–10	2–10	6–7	5–10	0–4
4	Chinese Taipei	10–2	—	5–6	6–7	4–9	1–3
3	Kazakhstan	10–2	6–5	—	4–7	4–10	2–2
2	Kyrgyzstan	7–6	7–6	7–4	—	5–14	3–1
1	Turkey	10–5	9–4	10–4	14–5	—	4–0

Group B Round Robin Summary Table
Pos.	Country	Austria	Czech Republic	Finland	Hungary	Nigeria	Slovenia	Record
4	Austria	—	4–7	2–4	5–9	13–4	6–5	2–3
2	Czech Republic	7–4	—	2–6	8–2	15–1	8–4	4–1
1	Finland	4–2	6–2	—	6–5	24–2	7–3	5–0
3	Hungary	9–5	2–8	5–6	—	15–2	8–7	3–2
6	Nigeria	4–13	1–15	2–24	2–15	—	2–17	0–5
5	Slovenia	5–6	4–8	3–7	7–8	17–2	—	1–4

Group C Round Robin Summary Table
Pos.	Country	Belgium	Estonia	Latvia	Romania	Slovakia	Spain	Record
2	Belgium	—	9–6	9–7	8–4	9–11	1–7	3–2
3	Estonia	6–9	—	9–0	13–1	11–6	6–7	3–2
4	Latvia	7–9	0–9	—	8–5	8–4	2–10	2–3
6	Romania	4–8	1–13	5–8	—	3–15	4–10	0–5
5	Slovakia	11–9	6–11	4–8	15–3	—	5–10	2–2
1	Spain	7–1	7–6	10–2	10–4	10–5	—	5–0

=== Round-robin results ===
All draw times are listed in Turkey Time (UTC+03:00).

==== Draw 1 ====
Sunday, October 10, 14:00

Sheet B	1	2	3	4	5	6	7	8	9	10	Final
Czech Republic (Klíma)	3	3	0	1	1	2	2	3	X	X	15
Nigeria (Woods)	0	0	1	0	0	0	0	0	X	X	1

Sheet C	1	2	3	4	5	6	7	8	9	10	Final
Austria (Higatzberger)	0	0	3	0	0	2	0	0	0	X	5
Hungary (Czermann)	0	1	0	3	1	0	1	2	1	X	9

Sheet D	1	2	3	4	5	6	7	8	9	10	Final
Chinese Taipei (Lin)	1	0	1	2	2	3	0	1	X	X	10
Brazil (Kraehenbuehl)	0	1	0	0	0	0	1	0	X	X	2

Sheet E	1	2	3	4	5	6	7	8	9	10	Final
Turkey (Karagöz)	4	0	1	0	3	0	4	0	2	X	14
Kyrgyzstan (Dmitriev)	0	2	0	1	0	1	0	1	0	X	5

==== Draw 2 ====
Sunday, October 10, 19:00

Sheet A	1	2	3	4	5	6	7	8	9	10	Final
Slovakia (Gallo)	0	0	0	1	2	1	0	0	0	0	4
Latvia (Vonda)	0	1	0	0	0	0	2	1	2	2	8

Sheet B	1	2	3	4	5	6	7	8	9	10	Final
Belgium (Verreycken)	0	0	0	0	1	0	0	0	0	X	1
Spain (Vez)	1	0	1	0	0	0	1	1	3	X	7

Sheet D	1	2	3	4	5	6	7	8	9	10	Final
Finland (Kiiskinen)	0	1	1	0	2	0	3	0	0	X	7
Slovenia (Sever)	0	0	0	1	0	1	0	1	0	X	3

Sheet E	1	2	3	4	5	6	7	8	9	10	Final
Estonia (Veltsman)	4	4	3	0	1	0	1	X	X	X	13
Romania (Anghelinei)	0	0	0	1	0	0	0	X	X	X	1

==== Draw 3 ====
Monday, October 11, 9:00

Sheet D	1	2	3	4	5	6	7	8	9	10	Final
Nigeria (Woods)	0	0	1	0	0	0	2	1	0	X	4
Austria (Higatzberger)	5	2	0	2	1	2	0	0	1	X	13

Sheet E	1	2	3	4	5	6	7	8	9	10	Final
Hungary (Czermann)	0	1	0	0	0	0	2	0	1	1	5
Finland (Kiiskinen)	1	0	2	1	1	0	0	1	0	0	6

==== Draw 4 ====
Monday, October 11, 14:00

Sheet A	1	2	3	4	5	6	7	8	9	10	Final
Slovenia (Sever)	0	0	0	0	1	0	2	0	1	X	4
Czech Republic (Klíma)	0	0	0	3	0	4	0	1	0	X	8

Sheet B	1	2	3	4	5	6	7	8	9	10	Final
Latvia (Vonda)	0	3	0	1	0	3	0	0	1	X	8
Romania (Anghelinei)	1	0	1	0	1	0	1	1	0	X	5

Sheet C	1	2	3	4	5	6	7	8	9	10	Final
Belgium (Verreycken)	2	0	2	0	2	0	0	1	0	2	9
Slovakia (Gallo)	0	2	0	2	0	2	3	0	2	0	11

==== Draw 5 ====
Monday, October 11, 19:00

Sheet A	1	2	3	4	5	6	7	8	9	10	11	Final
Spain (Vez)	0	0	2	1	0	0	0	0	3	0	1	7
Estonia (Veltsman)	1	0	0	0	0	2	0	1	0	2	0	6

Sheet B	1	2	3	4	5	6	7	8	9	10	Final
Kyrgyzstan (Dmitriev)	1	0	2	0	1	0	0	0	2	1	7
Chinese Taipei (Lin)	0	2	0	2	0	1	1	0	0	0	6

Sheet E	1	2	3	4	5	6	7	8	9	10	Final
Kazakhstan (Korabayev)	3	1	1	0	0	5	X	X	X	X	10
Brazil (Kraehenbuehl)	0	0	0	1	1	0	X	X	X	X	2

==== Draw 6 ====
Tuesday, October 12, 9:00

Sheet C	1	2	3	4	5	6	7	8	9	10	Final
Slovenia (Sever)	5	3	2	0	3	4	0	X	X	X	17
Nigeria (Woods)	0	0	0	1	0	0	1	X	X	X	2

Sheet D	1	2	3	4	5	6	7	8	9	10	Final
Hungary (Czermann)	0	0	1	0	1	0	0	X	X	X	2
Czech Republic (Klíma)	1	1	0	3	0	0	3	X	X	X	8

==== Draw 7 ====
Tuesday, October 12, 14:00

Sheet A	1	2	3	4	5	6	7	8	9	10	Final
Kyrgyzstan (Dmitriev)	1	1	0	0	1	0	1	0	1	2	7
Kazakhstan (Korabayev)	0	0	0	1	0	3	0	0	0	0	4

Sheet B	1	2	3	4	5	6	7	8	9	10	Final
Spain (Vez)	1	0	4	0	1	4	X	X	X	X	10
Latvia (Vonda)	0	1	0	1	0	0	X	X	X	X	2

==== Draw 8 ====
Tuesday, October 12, 19:00

Sheet A	1	2	3	4	5	6	7	8	9	10	Final
Chinese Taipei (Lin)	0	0	2	0	1	0	0	1	0	X	4
Turkey (Karagöz)	4	1	0	1	0	0	2	0	1	X	9

Sheet C	1	2	3	4	5	6	7	8	9	10	Final
Finland (Kiiskinen)	1	0	0	0	0	0	0	3	0	X	4
Austria (Higatzberger)	0	1	0	0	0	0	0	0	1	X	2

Sheet D	1	2	3	4	5	6	7	8	9	10	Final
Estonia (Veltsman)	0	0	1	0	1	0	4	0	0	0	6
Belgium (Verreycken)	1	2	0	1	0	1	0	1	1	2	9

Sheet E	1	2	3	4	5	6	7	8	9	10	Final
Romania (Anghelinei)	0	2	0	0	0	1	0	X	X	X	3
Slovakia (Gallo)	4	0	4	1	4	0	2	X	X	X	15

==== Draw 9 ====
Wednesday, October 13, 9:00

Sheet B	1	2	3	4	5	6	7	8	9	10	Final
Romania (Anghelinei)	0	1	0	2	0	1	0	0	0	X	4
Belgium (Verreycken)	0	0	3	0	1	0	0	2	2	X	8

Sheet C	1	2	3	4	5	6	7	8	9	10	Final
Latvia (Vonda)	0	0	0	0	0	0	0	X	X	X	0
Estonia (Veltsman)	1	1	1	2	2	1	1	X	X	X	9

Sheet D	1	2	3	4	5	6	7	8	9	10	Final
Slovakia (Gallo)	0	0	2	0	1	0	0	2	0	X	5
Spain (Vez)	0	2	0	1	0	3	2	0	2	X	10

==== Draw 11 ====
Wednesday, October 13, 19:00

Sheet A	1	2	3	4	5	6	7	8	9	10	Final
Czech Republic (Klíma)	1	0	2	1	0	1	1	0	1	X	7
Austria (Higatzberger)	0	2	0	0	0	0	0	2	0	X	4

Sheet B	1	2	3	4	5	6	7	8	9	10	11	Final
Slovenia (Sever)	1	0	1	0	1	0	2	0	1	1	0	7
Hungary (Czermann)	0	2	0	2	0	2	0	1	0	0	1	8

Sheet C	1	2	3	4	5	6	7	8	9	10	Final
Turkey (Karagöz)	3	0	2	0	3	0	2	0	X	X	10
Kazakhstan (Korabayev)	0	1	0	1	0	1	0	1	X	X	4

Sheet D	1	2	3	4	5	6	7	8	9	10	11	Final
Brazil (Kraehenbuehl)	0	0	0	1	1	0	1	1	1	1	0	6
Kyrgyzstan (Dmitriev)	2	1	1	0	0	2	0	0	0	0	1	7

Sheet E	1	2	3	4	5	6	7	8	9	10	Final
Finland (Kiiskinen)	4	4	0	5	0	4	4	3	X	X	24
Nigeria (Woods)	0	0	1	0	1	0	0	0	X	X	2

==== Draw 12 ====
Thursday, October 14, 9:00

Sheet B	1	2	3	4	5	6	7	8	9	10	Final
Brazil (Kraehenbuehl)	2	0	1	0	0	1	0	1	0	X	5
Turkey (Karagöz)	0	3	0	2	1	0	1	0	3	X	10

Sheet C	1	2	3	4	5	6	7	8	9	10	Final
Spain (Vez)	0	0	3	2	1	1	0	2	1	X	10
Romania (Anghelinei)	1	1	0	0	0	0	2	0	0	X	4

==== Draw 13 ====
Thursday, October 14, 14:00

Sheet A	1	2	3	4	5	6	7	8	9	10	Final
Nigeria (Woods)	0	1	0	1	0	0	0	0	0	X	2
Hungary (Czermann)	4	0	3	0	2	1	3	1	1	X	15

Sheet B	1	2	3	4	5	6	7	8	9	10	Final
Estonia (Veltsman)	0	0	5	0	2	0	2	0	2	X	11
Slovakia (Gallo)	0	0	0	4	0	1	0	1	0	X	6

Sheet C	1	2	3	4	5	6	7	8	9	10	Final
Czech Republic (Klíma)	0	0	0	1	0	0	0	1	X	X	2
Finland (Kiiskinen)	0	0	1	0	4	0	1	0	X	X	6

Sheet D	1	2	3	4	5	6	7	8	9	10	Final
Kazakhstan (Korabayev)	1	0	2	0	1	1	0	0	1	0	6
Chinese Taipei (Lin)	0	1	0	1	0	0	1	1	0	1	5

Sheet E	1	2	3	4	5	6	7	8	9	10	Final
Belgium (Verreycken)	0	0	1	1	0	3	0	2	0	2	9
Latvia (Vonda)	0	1	0	0	2	0	2	0	2	0	7

==== Draw 14 ====
Thursday, October 14, 19:00

Sheet E	1	2	3	4	5	6	7	8	9	10	Final
Austria (Higatzberger)	0	0	1	2	1	0	1	0	0	1	6
Slovenia (Sever)	0	2	0	0	0	1	0	0	2	0	5

=== Playoffs ===
Qualification Semifinals
4	Czech Republic	14
5	Belgium	3
3	Turkey	10
6	Kyrgyzstan	3

Qualification Finals
1	Spain	6
4	Czech Republic	7
2	Finland	10
3	Turkey	9

==== Qualification Semifinal 1 ====
Friday, October 15, 9:00

Sheet C	1	2	3	4	5	6	7	8	9	10	Final
Czech Republic (Klíma)	2	3	1	5	0	2	1	0	X	X	14
Belgium (Verreycken)	0	0	0	0	2	0	0	1	X	X	3

==== Qualification Semifinal 2 ====
Friday, October 15, 9:00

Sheet D	1	2	3	4	5	6	7	8	9	10	Final
Turkey (Karagöz)	2	0	0	2	0	4	2	0	X	X	10
Kyrgyzstan (Dmitriev)	0	1	0	0	1	0	0	1	X	X	3

==== Qualification Game 1 ====
Friday, October 15, 16:00

Sheet D	1	2	3	4	5	6	7	8	9	10	Final
Spain (Vez)	0	2	0	1	0	2	0	1	0	0	6
Czech Republic (Klíma)	0	0	1	0	2	0	1	0	2	1	7

==== Qualification Game 2 ====
Friday, October 15, 16:00

Sheet B	1	2	3	4	5	6	7	8	9	10	11	Final
Finland (Kiiskinen)	0	2	2	1	0	1	0	3	0	0	1	10
Turkey (Karagöz)	3	0	0	0	1	0	2	0	2	1	0	9

== Women ==
=== Teams ===
Austria	Brazil	Hungary	Kazakhstan	Latvia
Skip: Marijke Reitsma; Third: Verena Pflügler; Second: Jill Witschen; Lead: Johanna Höß; Alternate: Julia Kotek	Skip: Anne Shibuya; Third: Luciana Barrella; Second: Debora Monteiro; Lead: Leticia Cid	Fourth: Henrietta Miklai; Skip: Vera Kalocsai-van Dorp; Second: Nikolett Sándor; Lead: Dorottya Micheller; Alternate: Villő Hamvas	Fourth: Sitora Alliyarova; Skip: Angelina Ebauyer; Second: Tilsimay Alliyarova; Lead: Akgul Kumar; Alternate: Regina Ebauyer	Fourth: Evelīna Barone; Skip: Santa Blumberga-Bērziņa; Second: Ieva Rudzīte; Lead: Ieva Krusta; Alternate: Tīna Siliņa
Norway	Slovakia	Slovenia	Spain	Turkey
Skip: Marianne Rørvik; Third: Mille Haslev Nordbye; Second: Eli Skaslien; Lead: Martine Rønning	Skip: Daniela Matulová; Third: Lucia Orokocká; Second: Slávka Makovníková; Lead: Martina Ščepková	Fourth: Lea Žemlja; Skip: Ajda Zaveljcina; Second: Ema Kavčič; Lead: Maja Kučina; Alternate: Nika Černe	Skip: Irantzu García; Third: María Gómez; Second: María Fernández; Lead: Ana Vázquez; Alternate: Nerea Torralba	Skip: Dilşat Yıldız; Third: Öznur Polat; Second: Berfin Şengül; Lead: Ayşe Gözütok; Alternate: Mihriban Polat

=== Round-robin standings ===
Final round-robin standings

Key
Teams to Playoffs (Top 2 in each group)

Group A	Skip	W	L	W–L	DSC
Latvia	Santa Blumberga-Bērziņa	4	0	–	81.30
Hungary	Vera Kalocsai-van Dorp	3	1	–	88.33
Kazakhstan	Angelina Ebauyer	2	2	–	74.99
Spain	Irantzu García	1	3	–	101.07
Slovenia	Ajda Zaveljcina	0	4	–	68.53

Group B	Skip	W	L	W–L	DSC
Slovakia	Daniela Matulová	3	1	1–1	53.56
Turkey	Dilşat Yıldız	3	1	1–1	63.10
Norway	Marianne Rørvik	3	1	1–1	76.23
Brazil	Anne Shibuya	1	3	–	94.39
Austria	Marijke Reitsma	0	4	–	102.76

Group A Round Robin Summary Table
Pos.	Country	Hungary	Kazakhstan	Latvia	Slovenia	Spain	Record
2	Hungary	—	13–4	2–6	8–7	12–2	3–1
3	Kazakhstan	4–13	—	4–12	11–4	13–6	2–2
1	Latvia	6–2	12–4	—	12–3	7–3	4–0
5	Slovenia	7–8	4–11	3–12	—	4–8	0–4
4	Spain	2–12	6–13	3–7	8–4	—	1–3

Group B Round Robin Summary Table
Pos.	Country	Austria	Brazil	Norway	Slovakia	Turkey	Record
5	Austria	—	5–10	2–15	3–10	1–11	0–4
4	Brazil	10–5	—	1–10	4–11	2–12	1–3
3	Norway	15–2	10–1	—	5–6	8–3	3–1
1	Slovakia	10–3	11–4	6–5	—	4–10	3–1
2	Turkey	11–1	12–2	3–8	10–4	—	3–1

=== Round-robin results ===
All draw times are listed in Turkey Time (UTC+03:00).

==== Draw 3 ====
Monday, October 11, 9:00

Sheet A	1	2	3	4	5	6	7	8	9	10	Final
Kazakhstan (Ebauyer)	0	0	1	0	2	1	0	0	X	X	4
Hungary (Kalocsai-van Dorp)	3	1	0	5	0	0	3	1	X	X	13

Sheet B	1	2	3	4	5	6	7	8	9	10	Final
Brazil (Shibuya)	0	1	0	0	0	1	0	0	X	X	2
Turkey (Yıldız)	1	0	2	2	1	0	3	3	X	X	12

Sheet C	1	2	3	4	5	6	7	8	9	10	Final
Latvia (Blumberga-Bērziņa)	2	0	0	3	3	3	1	0	X	X	12
Slovenia (Zaveljcina)	0	1	1	0	0	0	0	1	X	X	3

==== Draw 4 ====
Monday, October 11, 14:00

Sheet E	1	2	3	4	5	6	7	8	9	10	Final
Austria (Reitsma)	0	1	2	0	0	0	0	0	X	X	3
Slovakia (Matulová)	3	0	0	2	1	0	2	2	X	X	10

==== Draw 5 ====
Monday, October 11, 19:00

Sheet C	1	2	3	4	5	6	7	8	9	10	Final
Turkey (Yıldız)	4	2	1	2	0	2	X	X	X	X	11
Austria (Reitsma)	0	0	0	0	1	0	X	X	X	X	1

Sheet D	1	2	3	4	5	6	7	8	9	10	Final
Spain (García)	0	0	0	1	0	1	0	1	0	X	3
Latvia (Blumberga-Bērziņa)	1	0	1	0	2	0	1	0	2	X	7

==== Draw 6 ====
Tuesday, October 12, 9:00

Sheet A	1	2	3	4	5	6	7	8	9	10	Final
Brazil (Shibuya)	0	1	1	1	3	0	2	0	2	X	10
Austria (Reitsma)	2	0	0	0	0	2	0	1	0	X	5

==== Draw 7 ====
Tuesday, October 12, 14:00

Sheet C	1	2	3	4	5	6	7	8	9	10	Final
Spain (García)	0	0	1	0	1	0	X	X	X	X	2
Hungary (Kalocsai-van Dorp)	0	2	0	6	0	4	X	X	X	X	12

Sheet D	1	2	3	4	5	6	7	8	9	10	Final
Slovenia (Zaveljcina)	1	1	0	0	0	1	0	1	0	X	4
Kazakhstan (Ebauyer)	0	0	1	1	4	0	3	0	2	X	11

Sheet E	1	2	3	4	5	6	7	8	9	10	Final
Norway (Rørvik)	0	1	2	0	0	0	4	1	X	X	8
Turkey (Yıldız)	1	0	0	1	0	1	0	0	X	X	3

==== Draw 8 ====
Tuesday, October 12, 19:00

Sheet B	1	2	3	4	5	6	7	8	9	10	Final
Hungary (Kalocsai-van Dorp)	1	0	3	1	0	2	0	1	0	0	8
Slovenia (Zaveljcina)	0	1	0	0	3	0	1	0	1	1	7

==== Draw 9 ====
Wednesday, October 13, 9:00

Sheet A	1	2	3	4	5	6	7	8	9	10	Final
Slovakia (Matulová)	0	0	1	2	1	0	1	0	1	0	6
Norway (Rørvik)	1	0	0	0	0	1	0	1	0	2	5

==== Draw 10 ====
Wednesday, October 13, 14:00

Sheet B	1	2	3	4	5	6	7	8	9	10	Final
Kazakhstan (Ebauyer)	2	2	0	2	0	3	0	2	2	X	13
Spain (García)	0	0	4	0	1	0	1	0	0	X	6

Sheet C	1	2	3	4	5	6	7	8	9	10	Final
Slovakia (Matulová)	2	1	3	0	2	2	0	1	X	X	11
Brazil (Shibuya)	0	0	0	1	0	0	3	0	X	X	4

Sheet D	1	2	3	4	5	6	7	8	9	10	Final
Austria (Reitsma)	0	0	1	0	1	0	X	X	X	X	2
Norway (Rørvik)	7	1	0	1	0	6	X	X	X	X	15

Sheet E	1	2	3	4	5	6	7	8	9	10	Final
Hungary (Kalocsai-van Dorp)	0	1	0	0	0	0	1	0	X	X	2
Latvia (Blumberga-Bērziņa)	1	0	1	0	1	1	0	2	X	X	6

==== Draw 12 ====
Thursday, October 14, 9:00

Sheet E	1	2	3	4	5	6	7	8	9	10	Final
Slovenia (Zaveljcina)	1	0	1	0	1	0	0	1	0	X	4
Spain (García)	0	2	0	2	0	3	0	0	1	X	8

==== Draw 14 ====
Thursday, October 14, 19:00

Sheet A	1	2	3	4	5	6	7	8	9	10	Final
Latvia (Blumberga-Bērziņa)	0	4	1	0	0	4	2	1	X	X	12
Kazakhstan (Ebauyer)	2	0	0	1	1	0	0	0	X	X	4

Sheet B	1	2	3	4	5	6	7	8	9	10	Final
Norway (Rørvik)	3	2	0	3	1	1	X	X	X	X	10
Brazil (Shibuya)	0	0	1	0	0	0	X	X	X	X	1

Sheet D	1	2	3	4	5	6	7	8	9	10	Final
Turkey (Yıldız)	1	0	2	1	0	3	0	3	X	X	10
Slovakia (Matulová)	0	2	0	0	1	0	1	0	X	X	4

=== Playoffs ===
Qualification Semifinals
A1	Latvia	9
B1	Slovakia	7
A2	Hungary	5
B2	Turkey	6

Qualification Finals
B1	Slovakia	3
B2	Turkey	12

Qualified
Latvia
Turkey

==== Qualification Game 1 ====
Friday, October 15, 9:00

Sheet B	1	2	3	4	5	6	7	8	9	10	Final
Latvia (Blumberga-Bērziņa)	3	0	0	3	0	0	2	0	0	1	9
Slovakia (Matulová)	0	1	1	0	1	1	0	3	0	0	7

==== Second Place Game ====
Friday, October 15, 9:00

Sheet A	1	2	3	4	5	6	7	8	9	10	11	Final
Hungary (Kalocsai-van Dorp)	0	1	0	1	1	0	0	1	0	1	0	5
Turkey (Yıldız)	0	0	1	0	0	1	2	0	1	0	1	6

==== Qualification Game 2 ====
Friday, October 15, 16:00

Sheet C	1	2	3	4	5	6	7	8	9	10	Final
Slovakia (Matulová)	0	0	2	0	1	0	0	0	X	X	3
Turkey (Yıldız)	5	0	0	1	0	2	1	3	X	X	12
