= Elif Kızılkaya =

Turkish curler

- Curler
- Born: 1991 (age 34–35); Erzurum, Turkey

Team
- Curling club: Atatürk University
- Skip: Elif Kızılkaya

Curling career
- World Mixed Doubles Championship: 1 (2012)
- European Championship: 3 (2010, 2011, 2012)
- Other appearances: Winter Universiade (2011); European Mixed Curling Championship (2012)

Elif Kızılkaya (born 1991 in Erzurum, Turkey) is a Turkish curler.

She curls in the Atatürk University's team in Erzurum.

Kızılkaya was admitted to the Turkey women's national team, which debuted at the 2010 European Curling Championships. She competed also in the 2012 European Mixed Curling Championship. She skips for the national team at the European Curling Championships-Group B in Karlstad, Sweden.

== Achievements ==
Year	Competition	Host	Position	Rank	GP	W	L
2010	European Curling Championships-Group B	(Switzerland) Champéry	Lead	20th	9	1	8
2011	25th Winter Universiade	(Turkey) Erzurum	Third	10th	9	0	9
2011	European Curling Championships-Group C	(Denmark) Tårnby	Third	4th	5	3	2
2012	World Mixed Doubles Curling Championship	(Turkey) Erzurum	Second	21st	8	2	6
2012	European Mixed Curling Championship	(Turkey) Erzurum	Third	23rd	7	1	6
2012	European Curling Championships-Group C	(Turkey) Erzurum	Third	2nd place, silver medalist(s)	7	6	1
2012	European Curling Championships-Group B	(Sweden) Karlstad	Skip	15th	9	4	5
Total					54	17	37
