= Turkey women's national curling team =

Women's national curlingl team representing Turkey

The Turkey women's national curling team (Turkish: Türkiye Milli Kadın Curling Takımı) represents Turkey in international women's curling. The team compete in the World Women's Curling Championships and European Women's Curling Championships.

== Home arena ==
Turkey play their home matches in the Milli Piyango Curling Arena in Erzurum, Turkey.

== Competitions ==
=== World Championships ===
Year	Host	Rank	Pld.	W	L	PF	PA
2022	Canada, Prince George	11	12	2	10	56	97
2023	Sweden, Sandviken	8	12	6	6	68	85
2024	Canada, Sydney	10	12	3	9	68	94
2025	South Korea, Uijeongbu	11	12	3	9	56	80
Total			48	14	34	248	356

=== World Mixed Doubles Championship ===
Year	Host	Rank	Pld.	W	L	PF	PA
2015	Russia, Sochi		9	3	6	52	73
2016	Sweden, Karlstad		7	4	3	43	48
2017	Canada, Lethbridge		7	2	5	47	58
2018	Sweden, Östersund	8	11	6	5	83	69
2019	Norway, Stavanger		7	5	2	51	37
2022	Switzerland, Geneva		9	1	8	41	80
2023	South Korea, Gangneung		9	4	5	64	53
2024	Sweden, Östersund		9	3	6	47	58
Total			68	28	40	428	496

=== European Championships ===
Year	Host	Div.	Rank	Pld.	W	L
2012	Turkey, Erzurum	B		7	6	1
2013	Norway, Stavanger	B		9	5	4
2014	Switzerland, Champéry	B		10	6	4
2015	Denmark, Esbjerg	B		9	6	3
2016	Scotland, Renfrewshire	B	2nd place, silver medalist(s)	11	8	3
2017	Switzerland, St Gallen	A		9	2	7
2018	Estonia, Tallinn	B	3rd place, bronze medalist(s)	11	8	3
2019	Sweden, Helsingborg	B	2nd place, silver medalist(s)	11	8	3
2021	Norway, Lillehammer	A		9	3	6
2022	Sweden, Östersund	A		9	4	5
2023	Scotland, Aberdeen	B		9	2	7
2024	Finland, Lohja	B	6	9	5	4
Total				113	63	50

== Current squad ==
As of 14 March 2025.

Coach: (Turkey) Bilal Ömer Çakır

No.	Pos.	Name	Date of birth (age)	Caps	Club
	SK	Dilşat Yıldız	26 September 1996 (age 29)		
	3rd	Öznur Polat	12 December 1987 (age 38)		
	2nd	İfayet Şafak Çalıkuşu	4 August 2002 (age 23)		
	LD	Berfin Şengül	20 August 2002 (age 23)		
	AL	İclal Karaman	23 February 2003 (age 22)		

== See also ==
- Turkey women's national under-21 curling team
