= Turkey women's national under-21 curling team =

Women's junior national curlingl team representing Turkey

Turkey women's junior national curling team (Turkish: Türkiye Genç Kadın Curling Milli Takımı) is the women's under-21 and under-19 national team formed by the Turkish Curling Federation (TCF) representing Turkey in international junior curling competitions like World Junior Curling Championships and European Junior Curling Challenge.

== Competitions ==
=== World Junior Championships ===
Year	Host	Rank	Pld.	W	L
2018	Scotland, Aberdeen		9	1	8
2024	Finland, Lohja	10	9	1	8
Total			18	2	16

=== European Junior Challenge ===
Year	Host	Rank	Pld.	W	L
2013	Czech Republic, Prague		5	3	2
2014	Finland, Lohja		6	2	4
2015	Czech Republic, Prague	2nd place, silver medalist(s)	6	4	2
Total			17	9	8

== See also ==
- Turkey women's national curling team
