= Milli Piyango Curling Arena =

Indoor curling rink in Erzurum, Turkey

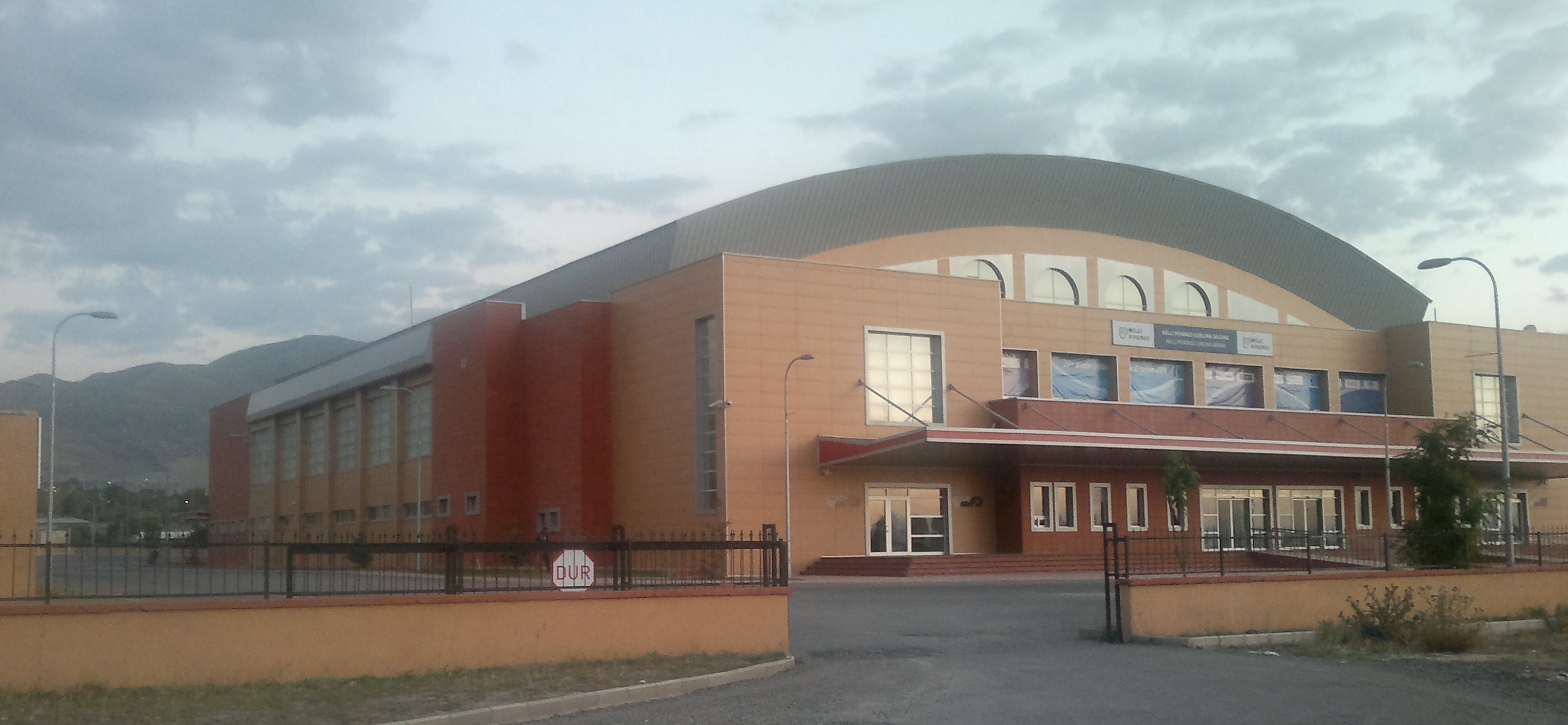
- Interactive map of Milli Piyango Curling Arena
- Full name: Milli Piyango Körling Salonu
- Location: Mecidiye Mah., Erzurum, Turkey
- Coordinates: 39.91583°N 41.28705°E
- Owner: General Directorate of Youth and Sports
- Capacity: 1,000

Construction
- Opened: September 2010
- Cost: ₺ 9 million (approx. $ 6.3 million)

Tenants
- 2011 Winter Universiade; 2012 World Mixed Doubles Curling Championship; 2012 European Mixed Curling Championship; 2012 European Curling Championships – Group C competitions

The Milli Piyango Curling Arena, is an indoor curling rink in Erzurum, Turkey. Opened in 2010, it is the country's first and only curling facility as of 2012. The arena has five curling sheets and 1,000 seating capacity.

The arena was built for the 2011 Winter Universiade, and opened in September 2010. The construction cost was ₺ 9 million (approx. $ 6.3 million). It is situated in the Mecidiye neighborhood, in the northeastern city outskirts.

Fully equipped to host international competitions, it has five curling sheets, and can hold 1,000 spectators.

== Events hosted ==
Year	Tournament	Date
2011	25th Winter Universiade	27 January–6 February
2012	5th World Mixed Doubles Curling Championship	23–29 April
2012	European Mixed Curling Championship	30 September–6 October
2012	European Curling Championships – Group C competitions	5–10 October
2017	European Youth Olympic Winter Festival	12–17 February
