= 2011 European Curling Championships – Women's tournament =

2011 European Curling Championships Women's tournament
- Host city: Moscow, Russia
- Arena: Megasport Arena
- Dates: December 2–10
- Winner: Scotland
- Skip: Eve Muirhead
- Third: Anna Sloan
- Second: Vicki Adams
- Lead: Claire Hamilton
- Alternate: Kay Adams
- Finalist: Sweden (Margaretha Sigfridsson)

The women's tournament of the 2011 European Curling Championships took place in Moscow, Russia from December 2 to 10. The winners of the Group C tournament in Tarnby, Denmark will move on to the Group B tournament. The top seven women's teams at the 2011 European Curling Championships, Scotland, Russia, Denmark, Germany, Italy, Switzerland, and the Czech Republic, will join defending champions Sweden in representing their respective nations at the 2012 Ford World Women's Curling Championship in Lethbridge, Alberta, Canada. The Czech Republic won the World Challenge Games over Group B winners Hungary to claim the last berth to the worlds.

In the Group A competitions, Sweden emerged from the round robin undefeated, with Denmark and Scotland trailing with one and two losses, respectively. Russia defeated Germany in the tiebreaker to qualify for the playoffs. The page playoffs saw defending champions Sweden trounce Denmark in eight ends and Scotland edge past Russia in an extra end. Scotland crushed Denmark in the semifinal in eight ends with a score of 10–2, and Denmark dropped to the bronze medal game. Home team Russia, skipped by Anna Sidorova, wrapped up a respectable performance with a 13–7 win over Denmark's Lene Nielsen. The final saw Sweden's Margaretha Sigfridsson, a lead at last year's championships, faced Scotland's Eve Muirhead in a rematch of the 2010 European Curling Championships gold medal game. An error-prone Sweden allowed Scotland to steal points in four of the first five ends before scoring a single point in the sixth. After two ends where both teams traded singles, bringing the game up to 6–2, Sweden conceded and gave Scotland their second championship title, their first since Betty Law led Scotland to win the inaugural championships in 1975.

The Group C competitions in Tårnby, Denmark saw Poland and Slovakia advance to the Group B competitions, after Slovakia defeated France in the semifinal. They joined eight other teams in Group B and played a round robin. In the page playoffs, Hungary advanced straight to the final after defeating Finland in the 1 vs. 2 game, while Poland advanced to the semifinal against Finland after defeating Slovakia. Finland won the semifinal over Poland, sending Poland to the bronze medal game to face Slovakia again. In their third meeting in the week, Slovakia finally triumphed over Poland by stealing the last two ends, winning with a score of 7–6. Hungary defeated Finland in a low-points affair to win the Group B competitions. As a result, Hungary and Finland advanced to the 2012 Women's Group A competitions, replacing Latvia and Norway, and Ireland and Wales were relegated to the 2012 Women's Group C competitions.

== Group A ==
=== Teams ===
| Czech Republic | Denmark | Germany | Italy | Latvia |
|---|---|---|---|---|
| Skip: Linda Klímová Third: Kamila Mošová; Second: Lenka Černovská; Lead: Katerina Urbanová; Alternate: Pavla Prokšíková | Skip: Lene Nielsen Third: Helle Simonsen; Second: Jeanne Ellegaard; Lead: Maria Poulsen; Alternate: Mette de Neergaard | Skip: Andrea Schöpp Third: Imogen Oona Lehmann; Second: Corinna Scholz; Lead: Stella Heiß; Alternate: Monika Wagner | Skip: Diana Gaspari Third: Giorgia Apollonio; Second: Chiara Olivieri; Lead: Claudia Alvera; Alternate: Veronica Gerbi | Skip: Ineta Mača Third: Elēna Kāpostiņa; Second: Rasa Lubarte; Lead: Ieva Rudzīte |
| Norway | Russia | Scotland | Sweden | Switzerland |
| Skip: Linn Githmark Third: Ingrid Michalsen; Second: Kristin Skaslien; Lead: Henriette Løvar; Alternate: Marte Bakk | Skip: Anna Sidorova Third: Liudmila Privivkova; Second: Margarita Fomina; Lead: Ekaterina Galkina; Alternate: Nkeiruka Ezekh | Skip: Eve Muirhead Third: Anna Sloan; Second: Vicki Adams; Lead: Claire Hamilton; Alternate: Kay Adams | Fourth: Maria Prytz Third: Christina Bertrup; Second: Maria Wennerström; Skip: Margaretha Sigfridsson; Alternate: Sabina Kraupp | Skip: Binia Feltscher Third: Marlene Albrecht; Second: Franziska Kaufmann; Lead: Christine Urech; Alternate: Manuela Siegrist |

=== Round-robin standings ===
Final round-robin standings

Key
| Countries to Playoffs |
| Countries to Tiebreakers |
| Countries relegated to 2012 Group B |

| Country | Skip | W | L | PF | PA | Ends Won | Ends Lost | Blank Ends | Stolen Ends | Shot Pct. |
|---|---|---|---|---|---|---|---|---|---|---|
| Sweden | Margaretha Sigfridsson | 9 | 0 | 81 | 32 | 41 | 28 | 5 | 17 | 82% |
| Denmark | Lene Nielsen | 8 | 1 | 79 | 39 | 42 | 31 | 5 | 15 | 78% |
| Scotland | Eve Muirhead | 7 | 2 | 63 | 58 | 39 | 35 | 9 | 10 | 76% |
| Russia | Anna Sidorova | 5 | 4 | 68 | 54 | 46 | 34 | 4 | 17 | 77% |
| Germany | Andrea Schöpp | 5 | 4 | 52 | 53 | 36 | 37 | 14 | 10 | 75% |
| Italy | Diana Gaspari | 3 | 6 | 54 | 61 | 37 | 37 | 11 | 10 | 71% |
| Switzerland | Binia Feltscher | 3 | 6 | 58 | 61 | 41 | 39 | 7 | 16 | 74% |
| Czech Republic | Linda Klímová | 3 | 6 | 52 | 68 | 31 | 41 | 7 | 11 | 68% |
| Latvia | Ineta Mača | 1 | 8 | 37 | 84 | 25 | 44 | 4 | 4 | 64% |
| Norway | Linn Githmark | 1 | 8 | 38 | 72 | 29 | 41 | 11 | 6 | 70% |

=== Round-robin results ===
==== Draw 1 ====
Saturday, December 3, 12:30

| Sheet A | 1 | 2 | 3 | 4 | 5 | 6 | 7 | 8 | 9 | 10 | Final |
|---|---|---|---|---|---|---|---|---|---|---|---|
| Scotland (Muirhead) 🔨 | 1 | 0 | 2 | 0 | 1 | 0 | 0 | 1 | 0 | 3 | 8 |
| Norway (Githmark) | 0 | 3 | 0 | 1 | 0 | 1 | 1 | 0 | 0 | 0 | 6 |

| Sheet B | 1 | 2 | 3 | 4 | 5 | 6 | 7 | 8 | 9 | 10 | Final |
|---|---|---|---|---|---|---|---|---|---|---|---|
| Italy (Gaspari) 🔨 | 1 | 1 | 0 | 1 | 2 | 0 | 0 | 1 | 1 | 1 | 8 |
| Switzerland (Feltscher) | 0 | 0 | 1 | 0 | 0 | 2 | 1 | 0 | 0 | 0 | 4 |

| Sheet C | 1 | 2 | 3 | 4 | 5 | 6 | 7 | 8 | 9 | 10 | Final |
|---|---|---|---|---|---|---|---|---|---|---|---|
| Denmark (Nielsen) | 0 | 1 | 2 | 0 | 2 | 0 | 1 | 0 | 0 | X | 6 |
| Sweden (Sigfridsson) 🔨 | 2 | 0 | 0 | 1 | 0 | 2 | 0 | 2 | 2 | X | 9 |

| Sheet D | 1 | 2 | 3 | 4 | 5 | 6 | 7 | 8 | 9 | 10 | Final |
|---|---|---|---|---|---|---|---|---|---|---|---|
| Germany (Schöpp) 🔨 | 1 | 2 | 0 | 1 | 0 | 0 | 2 | 0 | 1 | X | 7 |
| Latvia (Mača) | 0 | 0 | 2 | 0 | 0 | 2 | 0 | 1 | 0 | X | 5 |

| Sheet E | 1 | 2 | 3 | 4 | 5 | 6 | 7 | 8 | 9 | 10 | 11 | Final |
|---|---|---|---|---|---|---|---|---|---|---|---|---|
| Russia (Sidorova) | 1 | 0 | 2 | 0 | 2 | 0 | 2 | 2 | 1 | 0 | 0 | 10 |
| Czech Republic (Klímová) 🔨 | 0 | 2 | 0 | 4 | 0 | 1 | 0 | 0 | 0 | 3 | 2 | 12 |

==== Draw 2 ====
Saturday, December 3, 20:30

| Sheet A | 1 | 2 | 3 | 4 | 5 | 6 | 7 | 8 | 9 | 10 | Final |
|---|---|---|---|---|---|---|---|---|---|---|---|
| Russia (Sidorova) | 0 | 2 | 0 | 1 | 0 | 1 | 0 | 2 | 1 | X | 7 |
| Italy (Gaspari) 🔨 | 1 | 0 | 1 | 0 | 2 | 0 | 1 | 0 | 0 | X | 5 |

| Sheet B | 1 | 2 | 3 | 4 | 5 | 6 | 7 | 8 | 9 | 10 | Final |
|---|---|---|---|---|---|---|---|---|---|---|---|
| Scotland (Muirhead) 🔨 | 0 | 0 | 0 | 1 | 0 | 1 | X | X | X | X | 2 |
| Denmark (Nielsen) | 2 | 1 | 4 | 0 | 5 | 0 | X | X | X | X | 12 |

| Sheet C | 1 | 2 | 3 | 4 | 5 | 6 | 7 | 8 | 9 | 10 | 11 | Final |
|---|---|---|---|---|---|---|---|---|---|---|---|---|
| Switzerland (Feltscher) 🔨 | 0 | 1 | 0 | 0 | 1 | 0 | 0 | 1 | 1 | 1 | 0 | 5 |
| Germany (Schöpp) | 0 | 0 | 1 | 2 | 0 | 0 | 2 | 0 | 0 | 0 | 2 | 7 |

| Sheet D | 1 | 2 | 3 | 4 | 5 | 6 | 7 | 8 | 9 | 10 | Final |
|---|---|---|---|---|---|---|---|---|---|---|---|
| Sweden (Sigfridsson) 🔨 | 3 | 3 | 2 | 1 | 2 | 1 | X | X | X | X | 12 |
| Czech Republic (Klímová) | 0 | 0 | 0 | 0 | 0 | 0 | X | X | X | X | 0 |

| Sheet E | 1 | 2 | 3 | 4 | 5 | 6 | 7 | 8 | 9 | 10 | Final |
|---|---|---|---|---|---|---|---|---|---|---|---|
| Norway (Githmark) 🔨 | 1 | 0 | 0 | 0 | 2 | 0 | 2 | 0 | 1 | 0 | 6 |
| Latvia (Mača) | 0 | 0 | 3 | 1 | 0 | 0 | 0 | 2 | 0 | 2 | 8 |

==== Draw 3 ====
Sunday, December 4, 12:00

| Sheet A | 1 | 2 | 3 | 4 | 5 | 6 | 7 | 8 | 9 | 10 | 11 | Final |
|---|---|---|---|---|---|---|---|---|---|---|---|---|
| Switzerland (Feltscher) | 0 | 0 | 1 | 1 | 0 | 1 | 1 | 3 | 0 | 0 | 2 | 9 |
| Czech Republic (Klímová) 🔨 | 0 | 2 | 0 | 0 | 2 | 0 | 0 | 0 | 1 | 2 | 0 | 7 |

| Sheet B | 1 | 2 | 3 | 4 | 5 | 6 | 7 | 8 | 9 | 10 | Final |
|---|---|---|---|---|---|---|---|---|---|---|---|
| Russia (Sidorova) 🔨 | 1 | 0 | 2 | 0 | 0 | 1 | 2 | 1 | 1 | X | 8 |
| Germany (Schöpp) | 0 | 1 | 0 | 1 | 1 | 0 | 0 | 0 | 0 | X | 3 |

| Sheet C | 1 | 2 | 3 | 4 | 5 | 6 | 7 | 8 | 9 | 10 | Final |
|---|---|---|---|---|---|---|---|---|---|---|---|
| Italy (Gaspari) 🔨 | 2 | 0 | 2 | 0 | 2 | 0 | 1 | 4 | X | X | 11 |
| Latvia (Mača) | 0 | 1 | 0 | 2 | 0 | 1 | 0 | 0 | X | X | 4 |

| Sheet D | 1 | 2 | 3 | 4 | 5 | 6 | 7 | 8 | 9 | 10 | Final |
|---|---|---|---|---|---|---|---|---|---|---|---|
| Denmark (Nielsen) 🔨 | 1 | 0 | 1 | 1 | 0 | 2 | 0 | 6 | X | X | 11 |
| Norway (Githmark) | 0 | 0 | 0 | 0 | 1 | 0 | 1 | 0 | X | X | 2 |

| Sheet E | 1 | 2 | 3 | 4 | 5 | 6 | 7 | 8 | 9 | 10 | Final |
|---|---|---|---|---|---|---|---|---|---|---|---|
| Scotland (Muirhead) | 0 | 1 | 0 | 1 | 0 | 1 | 0 | 0 | 2 | X | 5 |
| Sweden (Sigfridsson) 🔨 | 0 | 0 | 2 | 0 | 3 | 0 | 2 | 1 | 0 | X | 8 |

==== Draw 4 ====
Sunday, December 4, 20:00

| Sheet A | 1 | 2 | 3 | 4 | 5 | 6 | 7 | 8 | 9 | 10 | Final |
|---|---|---|---|---|---|---|---|---|---|---|---|
| Latvia (Mača) | 0 | 0 | 1 | 1 | 1 | 0 | 1 | 0 | 1 | 0 | 5 |
| Denmark (Nielsen) 🔨 | 2 | 0 | 0 | 0 | 0 | 1 | 0 | 1 | 0 | 2 | 6 |

| Sheet B | 1 | 2 | 3 | 4 | 5 | 6 | 7 | 8 | 9 | 10 | Final |
|---|---|---|---|---|---|---|---|---|---|---|---|
| Sweden (Sigfridsson) 🔨 | 2 | 0 | 1 | 1 | 0 | 4 | X | X | X | X | 8 |
| Norway (Githmark) | 0 | 1 | 0 | 0 | 1 | 0 | X | X | X | X | 2 |

| Sheet C | 1 | 2 | 3 | 4 | 5 | 6 | 7 | 8 | 9 | 10 | Final |
|---|---|---|---|---|---|---|---|---|---|---|---|
| Czech Republic (Klímová) | 0 | 2 | 1 | 1 | 0 | 0 | 0 | 2 | 0 | X | 6 |
| Scotland (Muirhead) 🔨 | 2 | 0 | 0 | 0 | 2 | 3 | 1 | 0 | 2 | X | 10 |

| Sheet D | 1 | 2 | 3 | 4 | 5 | 6 | 7 | 8 | 9 | 10 | Final |
|---|---|---|---|---|---|---|---|---|---|---|---|
| Switzerland (Feltscher) | 0 | 1 | 1 | 0 | 1 | 0 | 2 | 0 | 0 | X | 5 |
| Russia (Sidorova) 🔨 | 2 | 0 | 0 | 2 | 0 | 2 | 0 | 3 | 2 | X | 11 |

| Sheet E | 1 | 2 | 3 | 4 | 5 | 6 | 7 | 8 | 9 | 10 | Final |
|---|---|---|---|---|---|---|---|---|---|---|---|
| Italy (Gaspari) 🔨 | 0 | 2 | 1 | 0 | 0 | 2 | 0 | 1 | 0 | 0 | 6 |
| Germany (Schöpp) | 0 | 0 | 0 | 2 | 1 | 0 | 2 | 0 | 0 | 2 | 7 |

==== Draw 5 ====
Monday, December 5, 12:00

| Sheet A | 1 | 2 | 3 | 4 | 5 | 6 | 7 | 8 | 9 | 10 | Final |
|---|---|---|---|---|---|---|---|---|---|---|---|
| Germany (Schöpp) | 0 | 1 | 2 | 0 | 0 | 0 | 2 | 0 | 0 | X | 5 |
| Scotland (Muirhead) 🔨 | 3 | 0 | 0 | 0 | 0 | 2 | 0 | 2 | 0 | X | 7 |

| Sheet B | 1 | 2 | 3 | 4 | 5 | 6 | 7 | 8 | 9 | 10 | Final |
|---|---|---|---|---|---|---|---|---|---|---|---|
| Latvia (Mača) | 0 | 2 | 0 | 0 | 0 | 0 | X | X | X | X | 2 |
| Russia (Sidorova) 🔨 | 1 | 0 | 3 | 3 | 2 | 1 | X | X | X | X | 10 |

| Sheet C | 1 | 2 | 3 | 4 | 5 | 6 | 7 | 8 | 9 | 10 | Final |
|---|---|---|---|---|---|---|---|---|---|---|---|
| Norway (Githmark) | 1 | 2 | 0 | 1 | 1 | 0 | 0 | 0 | 1 | 0 | 6 |
| Czech Republic (Klímová) 🔨 | 0 | 0 | 1 | 0 | 0 | 0 | 1 | 2 | 0 | 1 | 5 |

| Sheet D | 1 | 2 | 3 | 4 | 5 | 6 | 7 | 8 | 9 | 10 | Final |
|---|---|---|---|---|---|---|---|---|---|---|---|
| Italy (Gaspari) | 0 | 1 | 0 | 0 | 2 | 0 | 0 | 1 | 0 | X | 4 |
| Denmark (Nielsen) 🔨 | 1 | 0 | 1 | 2 | 0 | 4 | 1 | 0 | 4 | X | 13 |

| Sheet E | 1 | 2 | 3 | 4 | 5 | 6 | 7 | 8 | 9 | 10 | Final |
|---|---|---|---|---|---|---|---|---|---|---|---|
| Sweden (Sigfridsson) | 0 | 1 | 0 | 1 | 0 | 1 | 1 | 0 | 1 | 0 | 5 |
| Switzerland (Feltscher) 🔨 | 1 | 0 | 0 | 0 | 1 | 0 | 0 | 1 | 0 | 1 | 4 |

==== Draw 6 ====
Monday, December 5, 20:00

| Sheet A | 1 | 2 | 3 | 4 | 5 | 6 | 7 | 8 | 9 | 10 | Final |
|---|---|---|---|---|---|---|---|---|---|---|---|
| Czech Republic (Klímová) 🔨 | 4 | 0 | 3 | 1 | 1 | 1 | X | X | X | X | 10 |
| Latvia (Mača) | 0 | 1 | 0 | 0 | 0 | 0 | X | X | X | X | 1 |

| Sheet B | 1 | 2 | 3 | 4 | 5 | 6 | 7 | 8 | 9 | 10 | Final |
|---|---|---|---|---|---|---|---|---|---|---|---|
| Germany (Schöpp) 🔨 | 1 | 0 | 0 | 1 | 1 | 1 | 0 | 1 | 1 | 0 | 6 |
| Sweden (Sigfridsson) | 0 | 2 | 1 | 0 | 0 | 0 | 2 | 0 | 0 | 4 | 9 |

| Sheet C | 1 | 2 | 3 | 4 | 5 | 6 | 7 | 8 | 9 | 10 | Final |
|---|---|---|---|---|---|---|---|---|---|---|---|
| Scotland (Muirhead) 🔨 | 2 | 0 | 0 | 1 | 0 | 0 | 0 | 1 | 0 | 1 | 5 |
| Italy (Gaspari) | 0 | 1 | 0 | 0 | 1 | 0 | 1 | 0 | 1 | 0 | 4 |

| Sheet D | 1 | 2 | 3 | 4 | 5 | 6 | 7 | 8 | 9 | 10 | Final |
|---|---|---|---|---|---|---|---|---|---|---|---|
| Norway (Githmark) 🔨 | 0 | 0 | 0 | 2 | 0 | 0 | 0 | 1 | X | X | 3 |
| Switzerland (Feltscher) | 1 | 0 | 0 | 0 | 2 | 3 | 2 | 0 | X | X | 8 |

| Sheet E | 1 | 2 | 3 | 4 | 5 | 6 | 7 | 8 | 9 | 10 | 11 | Final |
|---|---|---|---|---|---|---|---|---|---|---|---|---|
| Denmark (Nielsen) | 0 | 1 | 0 | 0 | 2 | 0 | 1 | 0 | 3 | 0 | 1 | 8 |
| Russia (Sidorova) 🔨 | 1 | 0 | 1 | 1 | 0 | 2 | 0 | 1 | 0 | 1 | 0 | 7 |

==== Draw 7 ====
Tuesday, December 6, 16:00

| Sheet A | 1 | 2 | 3 | 4 | 5 | 6 | 7 | 8 | 9 | 10 | Final |
|---|---|---|---|---|---|---|---|---|---|---|---|
| Italy (Gaspari) 🔨 | 0 | 0 | 0 | 0 | 1 | 0 | 1 | 1 | 0 | X | 3 |
| Sweden (Sigfridsson) | 0 | 1 | 0 | 1 | 0 | 3 | 0 | 0 | 3 | X | 8 |

| Sheet B | 1 | 2 | 3 | 4 | 5 | 6 | 7 | 8 | 9 | 10 | Final |
|---|---|---|---|---|---|---|---|---|---|---|---|
| Denmark (Nielsen) 🔨 | 1 | 0 | 3 | 1 | 3 | 3 | X | X | X | X | 11 |
| Czech Republic (Klímová) | 0 | 1 | 0 | 0 | 0 | 0 | X | X | X | X | 1 |

| Sheet C | 1 | 2 | 3 | 4 | 5 | 6 | 7 | 8 | 9 | 10 | Final |
|---|---|---|---|---|---|---|---|---|---|---|---|
| Latvia (Mača) | 0 | 0 | 2 | 0 | 2 | 0 | 0 | 0 | X | X | 4 |
| Switzerland (Feltscher) 🔨 | 1 | 2 | 0 | 1 | 0 | 3 | 2 | 2 | X | X | 11 |

| Sheet D | 1 | 2 | 3 | 4 | 5 | 6 | 7 | 8 | 9 | 10 | Final |
|---|---|---|---|---|---|---|---|---|---|---|---|
| Russia (Sidorova) 🔨 | 0 | 0 | 1 | 0 | 0 | 1 | 1 | 1 | 0 | 0 | 4 |
| Scotland (Muirhead) | 1 | 0 | 0 | 2 | 0 | 0 | 0 | 0 | 2 | 2 | 7 |

| Sheet E | 1 | 2 | 3 | 4 | 5 | 6 | 7 | 8 | 9 | 10 | Final |
|---|---|---|---|---|---|---|---|---|---|---|---|
| Germany (Schöpp) | 1 | 0 | 1 | 0 | 2 | 0 | 0 | 4 | 0 | X | 8 |
| Norway (Githmark) 🔨 | 0 | 1 | 0 | 1 | 0 | 1 | 0 | 0 | 1 | X | 4 |

==== Draw 8 ====
Wednesday, December 7, 8:00

| Sheet A | 1 | 2 | 3 | 4 | 5 | 6 | 7 | 8 | 9 | 10 | Final |
|---|---|---|---|---|---|---|---|---|---|---|---|
| Denmark (Nielsen) 🔨 | 0 | 1 | 2 | 0 | 0 | 2 | 1 | 0 | 0 | 0 | 6 |
| Switzerland (Feltscher) | 1 | 0 | 0 | 1 | 0 | 0 | 0 | 1 | 1 | 1 | 5 |

| Sheet B | 1 | 2 | 3 | 4 | 5 | 6 | 7 | 8 | 9 | 10 | Final |
|---|---|---|---|---|---|---|---|---|---|---|---|
| Norway (Githmark) 🔨 | 2 | 0 | 0 | 0 | 2 | 0 | 0 | 0 | 1 | 0 | 5 |
| Italy (Gaspari) | 0 | 2 | 1 | 2 | 0 | 0 | 0 | 2 | 0 | 2 | 9 |

| Sheet C | 1 | 2 | 3 | 4 | 5 | 6 | 7 | 8 | 9 | 10 | Final |
|---|---|---|---|---|---|---|---|---|---|---|---|
| Sweden (Sigfridsson) | 0 | 0 | 1 | 1 | 1 | 0 | 2 | 0 | 3 | X | 8 |
| Russia (Sidorova) 🔨 | 0 | 1 | 0 | 0 | 0 | 2 | 0 | 1 | 0 | X | 4 |

| Sheet D | 1 | 2 | 3 | 4 | 5 | 6 | 7 | 8 | 9 | 10 | Final |
|---|---|---|---|---|---|---|---|---|---|---|---|
| Czech Republic (Klímová) | 0 | 1 | 0 | 0 | 1 | 0 | 1 | 0 | 0 | 0 | 3 |
| Germany (Schöpp) 🔨 | 1 | 0 | 0 | 1 | 0 | 0 | 0 | 1 | 1 | 1 | 5 |

| Sheet E | 1 | 2 | 3 | 4 | 5 | 6 | 7 | 8 | 9 | 10 | Final |
|---|---|---|---|---|---|---|---|---|---|---|---|
| Latvia (Mača) 🔨 | 0 | 0 | 2 | 0 | 0 | 1 | 1 | 0 | 2 | 0 | 6 |
| Scotland (Muirhead) | 2 | 1 | 0 | 1 | 3 | 0 | 0 | 1 | 0 | 1 | 9 |

==== Draw 9 ====
Wednesday, December 7, 16:00

| Sheet A | 1 | 2 | 3 | 4 | 5 | 6 | 7 | 8 | 9 | 10 | Final |
|---|---|---|---|---|---|---|---|---|---|---|---|
| Norway (Githmark) | 0 | 0 | 0 | 2 | 1 | 0 | 1 | 0 | 0 | 0 | 4 |
| Russia (Sidorova) 🔨 | 0 | 1 | 1 | 0 | 0 | 1 | 0 | 2 | 1 | 1 | 7 |

| Sheet B | 1 | 2 | 3 | 4 | 5 | 6 | 7 | 8 | 9 | 10 | Final |
|---|---|---|---|---|---|---|---|---|---|---|---|
| Switzerland (Feltscher) | 0 | 2 | 0 | 1 | 0 | 3 | 0 | 0 | 1 | 0 | 7 |
| Scotland (Muirhead) 🔨 | 1 | 0 | 1 | 0 | 3 | 0 | 2 | 2 | 0 | 1 | 10 |

| Sheet C | 1 | 2 | 3 | 4 | 5 | 6 | 7 | 8 | 9 | 10 | Final |
|---|---|---|---|---|---|---|---|---|---|---|---|
| Germany (Schöpp) 🔨 | 0 | 0 | 2 | 0 | 0 | 0 | 2 | 0 | 0 | 0 | 4 |
| Denmark (Nielsen) | 0 | 0 | 0 | 1 | 2 | 1 | 0 | 1 | 0 | 1 | 6 |

| Sheet D | 1 | 2 | 3 | 4 | 5 | 6 | 7 | 8 | 9 | 10 | Final |
|---|---|---|---|---|---|---|---|---|---|---|---|
| Latvia (Mača) | 0 | 1 | 0 | 0 | 0 | 1 | X | X | X | X | 2 |
| Sweden (Sigfridsson) 🔨 | 5 | 0 | 5 | 2 | 2 | 0 | X | X | X | X | 14 |

| Sheet E | 1 | 2 | 3 | 4 | 5 | 6 | 7 | 8 | 9 | 10 | Final |
|---|---|---|---|---|---|---|---|---|---|---|---|
| Czech Republic (Klímová) | 0 | 1 | 0 | 0 | 1 | 0 | 0 | 3 | 2 | 1 | 8 |
| Italy (Gaspari) 🔨 | 0 | 0 | 0 | 1 | 0 | 0 | 3 | 0 | 0 | 0 | 4 |

=== Placement Games ===
Thursday, December 8, 14:00

| Sheet B | 1 | 2 | 3 | 4 | 5 | 6 | 7 | 8 | 9 | 10 | Final |
|---|---|---|---|---|---|---|---|---|---|---|---|
| Switzerland (Feltscher) | 0 | 0 | 0 | 1 | 0 | 1 | 0 | 1 | 1 | 0 | 4 |
| Italy (Gaspari) 🔨 | 1 | 0 | 2 | 0 | 0 | 0 | 0 | 0 | 0 | 3 | 6 |

Thursday, December 8, 20:30

| Sheet B | 1 | 2 | 3 | 4 | 5 | 6 | 7 | 8 | 9 | 10 | Final |
|---|---|---|---|---|---|---|---|---|---|---|---|
| Switzerland (Feltscher) 🔨 | 0 | 2 | 1 | 0 | 0 | 0 | 2 | 0 | 0 | 1 | 6 |
| Czech Republic (Klimová) | 0 | 0 | 0 | 2 | 0 | 0 | 0 | 1 | 1 | 0 | 4 |

Czech Republic to World Challenge Games

=== World Challenge Games ===
==== Challenge 1 ====
Friday, December 9, 20:00

| Sheet E | 1 | 2 | 3 | 4 | 5 | 6 | 7 | 8 | 9 | 10 | Final |
|---|---|---|---|---|---|---|---|---|---|---|---|
| Czech Republic (Klimová) 🔨 | 0 | 0 | 3 | 0 | 0 | 2 | 0 | 0 | 2 | X | 7 |
| Hungary (Szekeres) | 0 | 0 | 0 | 1 | 1 | 0 | 2 | 0 | 0 | X | 4 |

==== Challenge 2 ====
Saturday, December 10, 9:30

| Sheet H | 1 | 2 | 3 | 4 | 5 | 6 | 7 | 8 | 9 | 10 | Final |
|---|---|---|---|---|---|---|---|---|---|---|---|
| Czech Republic (Klimová) 🔨 | 1 | 0 | 0 | 1 | 0 | 2 | 1 | 2 | 0 | X | 7 |
| Hungary (Szekeres) | 0 | 1 | 1 | 0 | 1 | 0 | 0 | 0 | 1 | X | 4 |

Czech Republic moves on to the 2012 World Women's Championship.

=== Tiebreaker ===
Thursday, December 8, 14:00

| Sheet B | 1 | 2 | 3 | 4 | 5 | 6 | 7 | 8 | 9 | 10 | Final |
|---|---|---|---|---|---|---|---|---|---|---|---|
| Russia (Sidorova) 🔨 | 1 | 0 | 1 | 0 | 0 | 0 | 2 | 1 | 0 | 1 | 6 |
| Germany (Schöpp) | 0 | 1 | 0 | 0 | 1 | 2 | 0 | 0 | 1 | 0 | 5 |

Player percentages
| Russia | | Germany | |
|---|---|---|---|
| Ekaterina Galkina | 80% | Stella Heiß | 83% |
| Margarita Fomina | 78% | Corinna Scholz | 79% |
| Liudmila Privivkova | 89% | Imogen Oona Lehmann | 61% |
| Anna Sidorova | 70% | Andrea Schöpp | 73% |
| Total | 79% | Total | 74% |

=== Playoffs ===
Page playoff system
1 | Sweden | 12
2 | Denmark | 6
3 | Scotland | 9
4 | Russia | 6

Semifinal
2 | Denmark | 2
3 | Scotland | 10

Gold-medal game
1 | Sweden | 2
3 | Scotland | 8

| Bronze-medal game |
| 2 | Denmark | 7 |
| 4 | Russia | 13 |

==== Page 1 vs. 2 ====
Thursday, December 8, 20:30

| Sheet B | 1 | 2 | 3 | 4 | 5 | 6 | 7 | 8 | 9 | 10 | Final |
|---|---|---|---|---|---|---|---|---|---|---|---|
| Sweden (Sigfridsson) 🔨 | 3 | 0 | 2 | 0 | 4 | 0 | 3 | 0 | X | X | 12 |
| Denmark (Nielsen) | 0 | 1 | 0 | 2 | 0 | 1 | 0 | 2 | X | X | 6 |

Player percentages
| Sweden | | Denmark | |
|---|---|---|---|
| Margaretha Sigfridsson | 93% | Maria Poulsen | 91% |
| Maria Wennerström | 91% | Jeanne Ellegaard | 69% |
| Christina Bertrup | 95% | Helle Simonsen | 70% |
| Maria Prytz | 77% | Lene Nielsen | 70% |
| Total | 89% | Total | 75% |

==== Page 3 vs. 4 ====
Thursday, December 8, 20:30

| Sheet E | 1 | 2 | 3 | 4 | 5 | 6 | 7 | 8 | 9 | 10 | 11 | Final |
|---|---|---|---|---|---|---|---|---|---|---|---|---|
| Russia (Sidorova) | 0 | 0 | 1 | 0 | 3 | 0 | 0 | 1 | 0 | 1 | 0 | 6 |
| Scotland (Muirhead) 🔨 | 0 | 2 | 0 | 2 | 0 | 1 | 1 | 0 | 0 | 0 | 3 | 9 |

Player percentages
| Russia | | Scotland | |
|---|---|---|---|
| Ekaterina Galkina | 70% | Claire Hamilton | 77% |
| Margarita Fomina | 80% | Vicki Adams | 83% |
| Liudmila Privivkova | 70% | Anna Sloan | 86% |
| Anna Sidorova | 75% | Eve Muirhead | 78% |
| Total | 74% | Total | 81% |

==== Semifinal ====
Friday, December 9, 13:00

| Sheet A | 1 | 2 | 3 | 4 | 5 | 6 | 7 | 8 | 9 | 10 | Final |
|---|---|---|---|---|---|---|---|---|---|---|---|
| Denmark (Nielsen) 🔨 | 0 | 1 | 0 | 0 | 0 | 0 | 1 | 0 | X | X | 2 |
| Scotland (Muirhead) | 0 | 0 | 3 | 3 | 0 | 2 | 0 | 2 | X | X | 10 |

Player percentages
| Denmark | | Scotland | |
|---|---|---|---|
| Maria Poulsen | 88% | Claire Hamilton | 75% |
| Jeanne Ellegaard | 84% | Vicki Adams | 92% |
| Helle Simonsen | 68% | Anna Sloan | 86% |
| Lene Nielsen | 70% | Eve Muirhead | 97% |
| Total | 78% | Total | 88% |

==== Bronze-medal game ====
Friday, December 9, 20:00

| Sheet B | 1 | 2 | 3 | 4 | 5 | 6 | 7 | 8 | 9 | 10 | Final |
|---|---|---|---|---|---|---|---|---|---|---|---|
| Denmark (Nielsen) 🔨 | 2 | 0 | 0 | 0 | 0 | 2 | 0 | 0 | 3 | 0 | 7 |
| Russia (Sidorova) | 0 | 2 | 1 | 1 | 2 | 0 | 1 | 1 | 0 | 5 | 13 |

Player percentages
| Denmark | | Russia | |
|---|---|---|---|
| Maria Poulsen | 93% | Ekaterina Galkina | 93% |
| Jeanne Ellegaard | 66% | Margarita Fomina | 76% |
| Helle Simonsen | 73% | Liudmila Privivkova | 81% |
| Lene Nielsen | 71% | Anna Sidorova | 73% |
| Total | 76% | Total | 81% |

==== Gold-medal game ====
Saturday, December 10, 10:00

| Sheet A | 1 | 2 | 3 | 4 | 5 | 6 | 7 | 8 | 9 | 10 | Final |
|---|---|---|---|---|---|---|---|---|---|---|---|
| Sweden (Sigfridsson) 🔨 | 0 | 0 | 0 | 0 | 0 | 1 | 0 | 1 | X | X | 2 |
| Scotland (Muirhead) | 1 | 1 | 0 | 2 | 3 | 0 | 1 | 0 | X | X | 8 |

Player percentages
| Sweden | | Scotland | |
|---|---|---|---|
| Margaretha Sigfridsson | 91% | Claire Hamilton | 73% |
| Maria Wennerström | 70% | Vicki Adams | 92% |
| Christina Bertrup | 77% | Anna Sloan | 80% |
| Maria Prytz | 55% | Eve Muirhead | 89% |
| Total | 73% | Total | 84% |

2011 European Curling Championships – Women's Winner
(Scotland)
Scotland
2nd title

== Group B ==
=== Teams ===
| Austria | England | Estonia | Finland | Hungary |
|---|---|---|---|---|
| Skip: Karina Toth Third: Constanze Hummelt; Second: Andrea Höfler; Lead: Tina Sauerstein | Skip: Fiona Hawker Third: Anna Fowler; Second: Angharad Ward; Lead: Deborah Hutcheon | Skip: Kristiine Lill Third: Ööle Janson; Second: Marju Velga; Lead: Marcella Tammes; Alternate: Küllike Ustav | Fourth: Sanna Puustinen Third: Heidi Hossi; Skip: Oona Kauste; Lead: Eszter Juhász; Alternate: Marjo Hippi | Skip: Ildikó Szekeres Third: Alexandra Béres; Second: Ágnes Patonai; Lead: Boglárka Ádám; Alternate: Blanka Pathy-Dencső |
| Ireland | Poland | Slovakia | Spain | Wales |
| Skip: Carolyn Hibberd Third: Louise Kerr; Second: Hazel Gormley Leahy; Lead: Gillian Drury; Alternate: Jane Paterson | Skip: Elzbieta Ran Third: Magda Straczek; Second: Magdalena Dumanowska; Lead: Agata Musik; Alternate: Agnieszka Handzlik | Skip: Gabriela Kajanova Third: Martina Kajanova; Second: Zuzana Axamitova; Lead: Zuzana Malcevova | Skip: Oihane Otaegi Third: Leire Otaegi; Second: Aitana Saenz; Lead: Iera Irazusta; Alternate: Asunción Manterola | Skip: Laura Beever Third: Jane Robbins; Second: Diana Houlbrooke; Lead: Sara Andrew |

=== Round-robin standings ===
Final round-robin standings

Key
| Countries to Playoffs |
| Countries to Tiebreakers |
| Countries relegated to 2012 Group C |

| Nation | Skip | W | L |
|---|---|---|---|
| Finland | Oona Kauste | 8 | 1 |
| Hungary | Ildikó Szekeres | 8 | 1 |
| Poland | Elzbieta Ran | 7 | 2 |
| Austria | Karina Toth | 5 | 4 |
| Estonia | Kristiine Lill | 5 | 4 |
| Slovakia | Gabriela Kajanova | 5 | 4 |
| England | Fiona Hawker | 3 | 6 |
| Spain | Oihane Otaegi | 3 | 6 |
| Ireland | Carolyn Hibberd | 1 | 8 |
| Wales | Laura Beever | 0 | 9 |

=== Round-robin results ===
==== Draw 1 ====
Saturday, December 3, 12:30

| Sheet F | 1 | 2 | 3 | 4 | 5 | 6 | 7 | 8 | 9 | 10 | Final |
|---|---|---|---|---|---|---|---|---|---|---|---|
| Finland (Kauste) 🔨 | 2 | 0 | 4 | 0 | 5 | 0 | X | X | X | X | 11 |
| Ireland (Hibberd) | 0 | 1 | 0 | 2 | 0 | 0 | X | X | X | X | 3 |

| Sheet G | 1 | 2 | 3 | 4 | 5 | 6 | 7 | 8 | 9 | 10 | Final |
|---|---|---|---|---|---|---|---|---|---|---|---|
| Austria (Toth) | 0 | 0 | 0 | 1 | 1 | 0 | 0 | 0 | 1 | X | 3 |
| Hungary (Szekeres) 🔨 | 2 | 1 | 1 | 0 | 0 | 1 | 1 | 1 | 0 | X | 7 |

| Sheet J | 1 | 2 | 3 | 4 | 5 | 6 | 7 | 8 | 9 | 10 | Final |
|---|---|---|---|---|---|---|---|---|---|---|---|
| Estonia (Lill) 🔨 | 2 | 0 | 2 | 1 | 1 | 0 | 4 | X | X | X | 10 |
| Wales (Beever) | 0 | 2 | 0 | 0 | 0 | 1 | 0 | X | X | X | 3 |

| Sheet K | 1 | 2 | 3 | 4 | 5 | 6 | 7 | 8 | 9 | 10 | Final |
|---|---|---|---|---|---|---|---|---|---|---|---|
| Poland (Ran) | 1 | 1 | 1 | 0 | 0 | 2 | 0 | 1 | 1 | X | 7 |
| Slovakia (Kajanova) 🔨 | 0 | 0 | 0 | 0 | 3 | 0 | 1 | 0 | 0 | X | 4 |

| Sheet L | 1 | 2 | 3 | 4 | 5 | 6 | 7 | 8 | 9 | 10 | Final |
|---|---|---|---|---|---|---|---|---|---|---|---|
| England (Hawker) 🔨 | 0 | 0 | 0 | 3 | 0 | 1 | 0 | 2 | 0 | X | 6 |
| Spain (Otaegi) | 0 | 0 | 0 | 0 | 1 | 0 | 1 | 0 | 2 | X | 4 |

==== Draw 2 ====
Saturday, December 3, 20:30

| Sheet F | 1 | 2 | 3 | 4 | 5 | 6 | 7 | 8 | 9 | 10 | Final |
|---|---|---|---|---|---|---|---|---|---|---|---|
| Poland (Ran) 🔨 | 1 | 1 | 0 | 3 | 2 | 0 | 2 | 0 | 0 | X | 9 |
| Austria (Toth) | 0 | 0 | 1 | 0 | 0 | 1 | 0 | 2 | 3 | X | 7 |

| Sheet G | 1 | 2 | 3 | 4 | 5 | 6 | 7 | 8 | 9 | 10 | 11 | Final |
|---|---|---|---|---|---|---|---|---|---|---|---|---|
| Spain (Otaegi) | 0 | 2 | 0 | 0 | 0 | 2 | 0 | 0 | 1 | 0 | 0 | 5 |
| Slovakia (Kajanova) 🔨 | 2 | 0 | 0 | 1 | 0 | 0 | 0 | 1 | 0 | 1 | 1 | 6 |

| Sheet H | 1 | 2 | 3 | 4 | 5 | 6 | 7 | 8 | 9 | 10 | 11 | Final |
|---|---|---|---|---|---|---|---|---|---|---|---|---|
| Finland (Kauste) 🔨 | 3 | 0 | 0 | 2 | 1 | 0 | 0 | 0 | 1 | 0 | 1 | 8 |
| Estonia (Lill) | 0 | 2 | 0 | 0 | 0 | 1 | 2 | 1 | 0 | 1 | 0 | 7 |

| Sheet J | 1 | 2 | 3 | 4 | 5 | 6 | 7 | 8 | 9 | 10 | Final |
|---|---|---|---|---|---|---|---|---|---|---|---|
| England (Hawker) 🔨 | 1 | 1 | 4 | 0 | 6 | 0 | 2 | X | X | X | 14 |
| Ireland (Hibberd) | 0 | 0 | 0 | 2 | 0 | 1 | 0 | X | X | X | 3 |

| Sheet K | 1 | 2 | 3 | 4 | 5 | 6 | 7 | 8 | 9 | 10 | Final |
|---|---|---|---|---|---|---|---|---|---|---|---|
| Hungary (Szekeres) 🔨 | 0 | 2 | 0 | 4 | 1 | 2 | 2 | X | X | X | 11 |
| Wales (Beever) | 1 | 0 | 1 | 0 | 0 | 0 | 0 | X | X | X | 2 |

==== Draw 3 ====
Sunday, December 4, 12:00

| Sheet F | 1 | 2 | 3 | 4 | 5 | 6 | 7 | 8 | 9 | 10 | Final |
|---|---|---|---|---|---|---|---|---|---|---|---|
| Wales (Beever) | 2 | 0 | 0 | 0 | 0 | 1 | 0 | 0 | 1 | X | 4 |
| Slovakia (Kajanova) 🔨 | 0 | 1 | 1 | 1 | 1 | 0 | 3 | 1 | 0 | X | 8 |

| Sheet G | 1 | 2 | 3 | 4 | 5 | 6 | 7 | 8 | 9 | 10 | 11 | Final |
|---|---|---|---|---|---|---|---|---|---|---|---|---|
| Ireland (Hibberd) 🔨 | 0 | 2 | 0 | 0 | 0 | 0 | 2 | 0 | 2 | 3 | 0 | 9 |
| Estonia (Lill) | 3 | 0 | 1 | 1 | 2 | 1 | 0 | 1 | 0 | 0 | 2 | 11 |

| Sheet H | 1 | 2 | 3 | 4 | 5 | 6 | 7 | 8 | 9 | 10 | Final |
|---|---|---|---|---|---|---|---|---|---|---|---|
| Hungary (Szekeres) 🔨 | 0 | 1 | 1 | 0 | 1 | 0 | 0 | 0 | 0 | X | 3 |
| Poland (Ran) | 3 | 0 | 0 | 1 | 0 | 1 | 0 | 0 | 1 | X | 6 |

| Sheet K | 1 | 2 | 3 | 4 | 5 | 6 | 7 | 8 | 9 | 10 | Final |
|---|---|---|---|---|---|---|---|---|---|---|---|
| England (Hawker) | 0 | 2 | 0 | 2 | 2 | 0 | 1 | 0 | 0 | X | 7 |
| Austria (Toth) 🔨 | 2 | 0 | 1 | 0 | 0 | 4 | 0 | 2 | 2 | X | 11 |

| Sheet L | 1 | 2 | 3 | 4 | 5 | 6 | 7 | 8 | 9 | 10 | Final |
|---|---|---|---|---|---|---|---|---|---|---|---|
| Spain (Otaegi) | 0 | 0 | 1 | 0 | 1 | 0 | X | X | X | X | 2 |
| Finland (Kauste) 🔨 | 2 | 1 | 0 | 3 | 0 | 4 | X | X | X | X | 10 |

==== Draw 4 ====
Sunday, December 4, 20:00

| Sheet F | 1 | 2 | 3 | 4 | 5 | 6 | 7 | 8 | 9 | 10 | Final |
|---|---|---|---|---|---|---|---|---|---|---|---|
| Ireland (Hibberd) | 1 | 0 | 1 | 0 | 0 | 0 | 2 | 0 | 0 | X | 4 |
| Hungary (Szekeres) 🔨 | 0 | 3 | 0 | 1 | 1 | 0 | 0 | 1 | 2 | X | 8 |

| Sheet G | 1 | 2 | 3 | 4 | 5 | 6 | 7 | 8 | 9 | 10 | 11 | Final |
|---|---|---|---|---|---|---|---|---|---|---|---|---|
| England (Hawker) | 0 | 1 | 0 | 2 | 0 | 1 | 1 | 1 | 0 | 2 | 0 | 8 |
| Finland (Kauste) 🔨 | 3 | 0 | 2 | 0 | 1 | 0 | 0 | 0 | 2 | 0 | 1 | 9 |

| Sheet H | 1 | 2 | 3 | 4 | 5 | 6 | 7 | 8 | 9 | 10 | Final |
|---|---|---|---|---|---|---|---|---|---|---|---|
| Austria (Toth) | 3 | 1 | 0 | 2 | 0 | 1 | 1 | 0 | 0 | X | 8 |
| Slovakia (Kajanova) 🔨 | 0 | 0 | 1 | 0 | 3 | 0 | 0 | 1 | 1 | X | 6 |

| Sheet J | 1 | 2 | 3 | 4 | 5 | 6 | 7 | 8 | 9 | 10 | Final |
|---|---|---|---|---|---|---|---|---|---|---|---|
| Wales (Beever) | 0 | 0 | 0 | 0 | 0 | 0 | X | X | X | X | 0 |
| Poland (Ran) 🔨 | 1 | 1 | 2 | 3 | 1 | 2 | X | X | X | X | 10 |

| Sheet K | 1 | 2 | 3 | 4 | 5 | 6 | 7 | 8 | 9 | 10 | Final |
|---|---|---|---|---|---|---|---|---|---|---|---|
| Estonia (Lill) | 0 | 0 | 0 | 0 | 2 | 1 | 0 | 2 | 0 | 0 | 5 |
| Spain (Otaegi) 🔨 | 0 | 0 | 1 | 2 | 0 | 0 | 2 | 0 | 2 | 1 | 8 |

==== Draw 5 ====
Monday, December 5, 12:00

| Sheet F | 1 | 2 | 3 | 4 | 5 | 6 | 7 | 8 | 9 | 10 | Final |
|---|---|---|---|---|---|---|---|---|---|---|---|
| England (Hawker) | 0 | 0 | 1 | 0 | 1 | 0 | 1 | 0 | 2 | 0 | 5 |
| Poland (Ran) 🔨 | 0 | 0 | 0 | 2 | 0 | 1 | 0 | 1 | 0 | 2 | 6 |

| Sheet G | 1 | 2 | 3 | 4 | 5 | 6 | 7 | 8 | 9 | 10 | Final |
|---|---|---|---|---|---|---|---|---|---|---|---|
| Hungary (Szekeres) 🔨 | 0 | 3 | 1 | 3 | 0 | 0 | 1 | X | X | X | 8 |
| Spain (Otaegi) | 0 | 0 | 0 | 0 | 0 | 2 | 0 | X | X | X | 2 |

| Sheet J | 1 | 2 | 3 | 4 | 5 | 6 | 7 | 8 | 9 | 10 | 11 | Final |
|---|---|---|---|---|---|---|---|---|---|---|---|---|
| Austria (Toth) | 0 | 3 | 0 | 2 | 0 | 0 | 1 | 0 | 2 | 1 | 0 | 9 |
| Estonia (Lill) 🔨 | 3 | 0 | 1 | 0 | 1 | 1 | 0 | 3 | 0 | 0 | 1 | 10 |

| Sheet K | 1 | 2 | 3 | 4 | 5 | 6 | 7 | 8 | 9 | 10 | Final |
|---|---|---|---|---|---|---|---|---|---|---|---|
| Slovakia (Kajanova) 🔨 | 1 | 0 | 0 | 0 | 2 | 0 | X | X | X | X | 3 |
| Finland (Kauste) | 0 | 3 | 1 | 3 | 0 | 4 | X | X | X | X | 11 |

| Sheet L | 1 | 2 | 3 | 4 | 5 | 6 | 7 | 8 | 9 | 10 | Final |
|---|---|---|---|---|---|---|---|---|---|---|---|
| Ireland (Hibberd) 🔨 | 1 | 0 | 1 | 2 | 0 | 1 | 0 | 1 | 6 | X | 12 |
| Wales (Beever) | 0 | 1 | 0 | 0 | 2 | 0 | 5 | 0 | 0 | X | 8 |

==== Draw 6 ====
Monday, December 5, 20:00

| Sheet F | 1 | 2 | 3 | 4 | 5 | 6 | 7 | 8 | 9 | 10 | Final |
|---|---|---|---|---|---|---|---|---|---|---|---|
| Slovakia (Kajanova) 🔨 | 1 | 0 | 0 | 1 | 2 | 1 | 3 | X | X | X | 8 |
| Estonia (Lill) | 0 | 1 | 0 | 0 | 0 | 0 | 0 | X | X | X | 1 |

| Sheet G | 1 | 2 | 3 | 4 | 5 | 6 | 7 | 8 | 9 | 10 | Final |
|---|---|---|---|---|---|---|---|---|---|---|---|
| Finland (Kauste) | 3 | 1 | 2 | 0 | 3 | 0 | X | X | X | X | 9 |
| Wales (Beever) 🔨 | 0 | 0 | 0 | 1 | 0 | 1 | X | X | X | X | 2 |

| Sheet H | 1 | 2 | 3 | 4 | 5 | 6 | 7 | 8 | 9 | 10 | Final |
|---|---|---|---|---|---|---|---|---|---|---|---|
| Spain (Otaegi) 🔨 | 1 | 0 | 0 | 0 | 0 | 1 | 0 | X | X | X | 2 |
| Austria (Toth) | 0 | 3 | 1 | 2 | 1 | 0 | 3 | X | X | X | 10 |

| Sheet K | 1 | 2 | 3 | 4 | 5 | 6 | 7 | 8 | 9 | 10 | Final |
|---|---|---|---|---|---|---|---|---|---|---|---|
| Ireland (Hibberd) 🔨 | 0 | 1 | 0 | 1 | 0 | 3 | 0 | 0 | 1 | X | 6 |
| Poland (Ran) | 1 | 0 | 1 | 0 | 4 | 0 | 2 | 2 | 0 | X | 10 |

| Sheet L | 1 | 2 | 3 | 4 | 5 | 6 | 7 | 8 | 9 | 10 | Final |
|---|---|---|---|---|---|---|---|---|---|---|---|
| Hungary (Szekeres) 🔨 | 1 | 1 | 0 | 0 | 2 | 0 | 2 | 0 | 1 | 1 | 8 |
| England (Hawker) | 0 | 0 | 1 | 1 | 0 | 2 | 0 | 2 | 0 | 0 | 6 |

==== Draw 7 ====
Tuesday, December 6, 12:00

| Sheet F | 1 | 2 | 3 | 4 | 5 | 6 | 7 | 8 | 9 | 10 | Final |
|---|---|---|---|---|---|---|---|---|---|---|---|
| Austria (Toth) 🔨 | 2 | 0 | 2 | 0 | 0 | 0 | 1 | 0 | 1 | 0 | 6 |
| Finland (Kauste) | 0 | 2 | 0 | 2 | 1 | 0 | 0 | 1 | 0 | 2 | 8 |

| Sheet H | 1 | 2 | 3 | 4 | 5 | 6 | 7 | 8 | 9 | 10 | Final |
|---|---|---|---|---|---|---|---|---|---|---|---|
| Estonia (Lill) | 0 | 1 | 0 | 0 | 1 | 1 | 0 | 0 | 0 | 0 | 3 |
| Hungary (Szekeres) 🔨 | 1 | 0 | 0 | 2 | 0 | 0 | 1 | 0 | 0 | 1 | 5 |

| Sheet I | 1 | 2 | 3 | 4 | 5 | 6 | 7 | 8 | 9 | 10 | 11 | Final |
|---|---|---|---|---|---|---|---|---|---|---|---|---|
| Poland (Ran) | 0 | 0 | 0 | 0 | 0 | 3 | 0 | 0 | 0 | 1 | 2 | 6 |
| Spain (Otaegi) 🔨 | 0 | 1 | 0 | 0 | 0 | 0 | 0 | 1 | 2 | 0 | 0 | 4 |

| Sheet J | 1 | 2 | 3 | 4 | 5 | 6 | 7 | 8 | 9 | 10 | Final |
|---|---|---|---|---|---|---|---|---|---|---|---|
| Wales (Beever) | 1 | 0 | 0 | 0 | 0 | 0 | X | X | X | X | 1 |
| England (Hawker) 🔨 | 0 | 1 | 5 | 5 | 1 | 0 | X | X | X | X | 12 |

| Sheet K | 1 | 2 | 3 | 4 | 5 | 6 | 7 | 8 | 9 | 10 | Final |
|---|---|---|---|---|---|---|---|---|---|---|---|
| Slovakia (Kajanova) | 1 | 0 | 1 | 1 | 0 | 1 | 0 | 1 | 0 | 1 | 6 |
| Ireland (Hibberd) 🔨 | 0 | 1 | 0 | 0 | 2 | 0 | 0 | 0 | 1 | 0 | 4 |

==== Draw 8 ====
Tuesday, December 6, 20:00

| Sheet F | 1 | 2 | 3 | 4 | 5 | 6 | 7 | 8 | 9 | 10 | Final |
|---|---|---|---|---|---|---|---|---|---|---|---|
| Spain (Otaegi) | 0 | 1 | 3 | 0 | 0 | 3 | 0 | 4 | X | X | 11 |
| Wales (Beever) 🔨 | 1 | 0 | 0 | 1 | 1 | 0 | 1 | 0 | X | X | 4 |

| Sheet G | 1 | 2 | 3 | 4 | 5 | 6 | 7 | 8 | 9 | 10 | 11 | Final |
|---|---|---|---|---|---|---|---|---|---|---|---|---|
| Estonia (Lill) 🔨 | 1 | 0 | 2 | 0 | 0 | 2 | 0 | 3 | 0 | 0 | 1 | 9 |
| Poland (Ran) | 0 | 0 | 0 | 2 | 2 | 0 | 2 | 0 | 1 | 1 | 0 | 8 |

| Sheet H | 1 | 2 | 3 | 4 | 5 | 6 | 7 | 8 | 9 | 10 | Final |
|---|---|---|---|---|---|---|---|---|---|---|---|
| Slovakia (Kajanova) | 0 | 1 | 1 | 0 | 0 | 0 | 2 | 0 | 2 | 2 | 8 |
| England (Hawker) 🔨 | 1 | 0 | 0 | 1 | 1 | 1 | 0 | 1 | 0 | 0 | 5 |

| Sheet J | 1 | 2 | 3 | 4 | 5 | 6 | 7 | 8 | 9 | 10 | Final |
|---|---|---|---|---|---|---|---|---|---|---|---|
| Ireland (Hibberd) 🔨 | 1 | 0 | 1 | 0 | 1 | 0 | 0 | X | X | X | 3 |
| Austria (Toth) | 0 | 2 | 0 | 3 | 0 | 4 | 1 | X | X | X | 10 |

| Sheet L | 1 | 2 | 3 | 4 | 5 | 6 | 7 | 8 | 9 | 10 | Final |
|---|---|---|---|---|---|---|---|---|---|---|---|
| Finland (Kauste) | 0 | 0 | 2 | 1 | 2 | 1 | 0 | 1 | 0 | 0 | 7 |
| Hungary (Szekeres) 🔨 | 2 | 2 | 0 | 0 | 0 | 0 | 1 | 0 | 2 | 1 | 8 |

==== Draw 9 ====
Wednesday, December 7, 12:00

| Sheet F | 1 | 2 | 3 | 4 | 5 | 6 | 7 | 8 | 9 | 10 | Final |
|---|---|---|---|---|---|---|---|---|---|---|---|
| Estonia (Lill) 🔨 | 2 | 0 | 3 | 2 | 0 | 0 | 0 | 0 | 0 | 1 | 8 |
| England (Hawker) | 0 | 2 | 0 | 0 | 1 | 1 | 1 | 1 | 1 | 0 | 7 |

| Sheet H | 1 | 2 | 3 | 4 | 5 | 6 | 7 | 8 | 9 | 10 | Final |
|---|---|---|---|---|---|---|---|---|---|---|---|
| Poland (Ran) | 0 | 0 | 1 | 1 | 0 | 0 | 2 | 0 | 0 | 0 | 4 |
| Finland (Kauste) 🔨 | 0 | 0 | 0 | 0 | 0 | 1 | 0 | 2 | 2 | 1 | 6 |

| Sheet J | 1 | 2 | 3 | 4 | 5 | 6 | 7 | 8 | 9 | 10 | 11 | Final |
|---|---|---|---|---|---|---|---|---|---|---|---|---|
| Slovakia (Kajanova) 🔨 | 0 | 2 | 0 | 0 | 0 | 1 | 0 | 0 | 0 | 1 | 0 | 4 |
| Hungary (Szekeres) | 0 | 0 | 1 | 0 | 1 | 0 | 1 | 1 | 0 | 0 | 1 | 5 |

| Sheet K | 1 | 2 | 3 | 4 | 5 | 6 | 7 | 8 | 9 | 10 | Final |
|---|---|---|---|---|---|---|---|---|---|---|---|
| Spain (Otaegi) 🔨 | 1 | 0 | 0 | 2 | 2 | 2 | 1 | 1 | 2 | X | 11 |
| Ireland (Hibberd) | 0 | 1 | 4 | 0 | 0 | 0 | 0 | 0 | 0 | X | 5 |

| Sheet L | 1 | 2 | 3 | 4 | 5 | 6 | 7 | 8 | 9 | 10 | Final |
|---|---|---|---|---|---|---|---|---|---|---|---|
| Wales (Beever) | 0 | 0 | 3 | 0 | 0 | 1 | X | X | X | X | 4 |
| Austria (Toth) 🔨 | 2 | 3 | 0 | 3 | 5 | 0 | X | X | X | X | 13 |

=== Tiebreakers ===
| Round 1 | | | To Page Playoffs |
| | | | 1 | Austria | 7 |
| 2 | Estonia | 3 | | Slovakia | 9 |
| 3 | Slovakia | 7 |

==== Round 1 ====
Wednesday, December 7, 20:00

| Sheet C | 1 | 2 | 3 | 4 | 5 | 6 | 7 | 8 | 9 | 10 | Final |
|---|---|---|---|---|---|---|---|---|---|---|---|
| Estonia (Lill) | 0 | 1 | 0 | 0 | 1 | 0 | 0 | 1 | 0 | X | 3 |
| Slovakia (Kajanova) 🔨 | 1 | 0 | 0 | 1 | 0 | 1 | 2 | 0 | 2 | X | 7 |

==== Round 2 ====
Thursday, December 8, 9:00

| Sheet A | 1 | 2 | 3 | 4 | 5 | 6 | 7 | 8 | 9 | 10 | 11 | Final |
|---|---|---|---|---|---|---|---|---|---|---|---|---|
| Austria (Toth) 🔨 | 0 | 0 | 1 | 1 | 0 | 2 | 0 | 1 | 0 | 2 | 0 | 7 |
| Slovakia (Kajanova) | 1 | 2 | 0 | 0 | 2 | 0 | 1 | 0 | 1 | 0 | 2 | 9 |

=== Playoffs ===
Page playoff system
1 | Hungary | 7
2 | Finland | 4
3 | Poland | 7
4 | Slovakia | 3

Semifinal
2 | Finland | 8
3 | Poland | 7

Gold-medal game
1 | Hungary | 4
2 | Finland | 1

| Bronze-medal game |
| 3 | Poland | 6 |
| 4 | Slovakia | 7 |

==== Page 1 vs. 2 ====
Thursday, December 8, 20:00

| Sheet G | 1 | 2 | 3 | 4 | 5 | 6 | 7 | 8 | 9 | 10 | Final |
|---|---|---|---|---|---|---|---|---|---|---|---|
| Hungary (Szekeres) 🔨 | 1 | 0 | 1 | 0 | 2 | 0 | 0 | 3 | 0 | X | 7 |
| Finland (Kauste) | 0 | 1 | 0 | 1 | 0 | 0 | 1 | 0 | 1 | X | 4 |

==== Page 3 vs. 4 ====
Thursday, December 8, 20:00

| Sheet H | 1 | 2 | 3 | 4 | 5 | 6 | 7 | 8 | 9 | 10 | Final |
|---|---|---|---|---|---|---|---|---|---|---|---|
| Poland (Ran) 🔨 | 2 | 0 | 0 | 2 | 0 | 1 | 0 | 1 | 1 | X | 7 |
| Slovakia (Kajanova) | 0 | 2 | 0 | 0 | 1 | 0 | 0 | 0 | 0 | X | 3 |

==== Semifinal ====
Friday, December 9, 8:00

| Sheet F | 1 | 2 | 3 | 4 | 5 | 6 | 7 | 8 | 9 | 10 | Final |
|---|---|---|---|---|---|---|---|---|---|---|---|
| Finland (Kauste) 🔨 | 1 | 0 | 0 | 0 | 1 | 2 | 0 | 3 | 0 | 1 | 8 |
| Poland (Ran) | 0 | 1 | 0 | 0 | 0 | 0 | 4 | 0 | 2 | 0 | 7 |

==== Bronze-medal game ====
Saturday, December 10, 9:30

| Sheet J | 1 | 2 | 3 | 4 | 5 | 6 | 7 | 8 | 9 | 10 | Final |
|---|---|---|---|---|---|---|---|---|---|---|---|
| Poland (Ran) 🔨 | 0 | 0 | 1 | 0 | 0 | 3 | 2 | 0 | 0 | 0 | 6 |
| Slovakia (Kajanova) | 1 | 0 | 0 | 1 | 1 | 0 | 0 | 1 | 1 | 2 | 7 |

==== Gold-medal game ====
Friday, December 9, 13:00

| Sheet K | 1 | 2 | 3 | 4 | 5 | 6 | 7 | 8 | 9 | 10 | Final |
|---|---|---|---|---|---|---|---|---|---|---|---|
| Hungary (Szekeres) 🔨 | 0 | 0 | 0 | 2 | 0 | 1 | 0 | 0 | 1 | X | 4 |
| Finland (Kauste) | 0 | 0 | 0 | 0 | 0 | 0 | 1 | 0 | 0 | X | 1 |

== Group C ==
=== Teams ===
| France | Romania | Serbia | Slovenia | Turkey |
|---|---|---|---|---|
| Skip: Anna Li Third: Pauline Jeanneret; Second: Marie Coulot; Lead: Salomé Bourny | Skip: Crina Novac Third: Daiana Colceriu; Second: Diana Butucea; Lead: Bianca Neagoe; Alternate: Ruxandra Dică | Skip: Dara Gravara Stojanovic Third: Dragana Simjanovic; Second: Tatjana Jeftig; Lead: Jovana Mijatovic; Alternate: Olivera Momcilovic | Skip: Maja Kremzar Third: Valentina Jurincic; Second: Marija Plemenitas; Lead: Nadja Pipan; Alternate: Irena Mancek | Skip: Öznur Polat Third: Elif Kızılkaya; Second: Şeyda Zengin; Lead: Ayşe Gözütok; Alternate: Aysun Ergin |

| Belgium | Belarus | Croatia | Poland | Slovakia |
|---|---|---|---|---|
| Skip: Karen Geerts Third: Natcha Leynen; Second: Liesbeth Rossie; Lead: Mieke van Aerde; Alternate: Karin Stoop | Skip: Ekaterina Kirillova Third: Alina Pauliuchyk; Second: Natalia Sviarzinskaya; Lead: Suzanna Ivasyhna | Skip: Iva Pennava Third: Iva Roso; Second: Lucija Fabijanic; Lead: Anita Sajfar; Alternate: Antonia Maricevic | Skip: Elzbieta Ran Third: Magda Straczek; Second: Magdalena Dumanowska; Lead: Agata Musik; Alternate: Agnieszka Handzlik | Skip: Gabriella Kajanova Third: Martina Kajanova; Second: Zuzana Axamitova; Lead: Zuzana Malcevova |

=== Round-robin standings ===
Final round-robin standings

Key
| Countries to Playoffs |

| Yellow Group | Skip | W | L |
|---|---|---|---|
| France | Anna Li | 4 | 0 |
| Turkey | Öznur Polat | 3 | 1 |
| Slovenia | Maja Kremzar | 2 | 2 |
| Romania | Crina Novac | 1 | 3 |
| Serbia | Dana Gravara Stojanovic | 0 | 4 |

| Green Group | Skip | W | L |
|---|---|---|---|
| Poland | Elzbieta Ran | 4 | 0 |
| Slovakia | Gabriella Kajanova | 3 | 1 |
| Belarus | Ekaterina Kirillova | 2 | 2 |
| Belgium | Karen Geerts | 1 | 3 |
| Croatia | Iva Pennava | 0 | 4 |

=== Yellow Group Results ===
==== Draw 1 ====
Friday, September 30, 18:30

| Sheet 1 | 1 | 2 | 3 | 4 | 5 | 6 | 7 | 8 | Final |
| Serbia (Stojanovic) | 0 | 0 | 0 | 0 | 1 | 0 | X | X | 0 |
| Turkey (Polat) 🔨 | 5 | 2 | 1 | 5 | 0 | 4 | X | X | 17 |

| Sheet 2 | 1 | 2 | 3 | 4 | 5 | 6 | 7 | 8 | Final |
| France (Li) 🔨 | 3 | 0 | 5 | 3 | 2 | 0 | 3 | X | 16 |
| Slovenia (Kremzar) | 0 | 1 | 0 | 0 | 0 | 1 | 0 | X | 2 |

==== Draw 2 ====
Saturday, October 1, 08:00

| Sheet 3 | 1 | 2 | 3 | 4 | 5 | 6 | 7 | 8 | Final |
| Slovenia (Kremzar) 🔨 | 1 | 0 | 3 | 0 | 0 | 1 | 1 | 3 | 9 |
| Romania (Novac) | 0 | 3 | 0 | 1 | 1 | 0 | 0 | 0 | 5 |

| Sheet 4 | 1 | 2 | 3 | 4 | 5 | 6 | 7 | 8 | Final |
| Turkey (Polat) 🔨 | 2 | 0 | 0 | 0 | 1 | 0 | 0 | X | 3 |
| France (Li) | 0 | 2 | 2 | 3 | 0 | 2 | 0 | X | 9 |

==== Draw 3 ====
Sunday, October 2, 12:00

| Sheet 3 | 1 | 2 | 3 | 4 | 5 | 6 | 7 | 8 | Final |
| Romania (Novac) | 0 | 1 | 0 | 0 | 0 | 0 | X | X | 1 |
| France (Li) 🔨 | 4 | 0 | 2 | 1 | 3 | 5 | X | X | 15 |

| Sheet 4 | 1 | 2 | 3 | 4 | 5 | 6 | 7 | 8 | Final |
| Slovenia (Kremzar) | 1 | 0 | 3 | 0 | 2 | 0 | 1 | 2 | 9 |
| Serbia (Stojanovic) 🔨 | 0 | 1 | 0 | 2 | 0 | 2 | 0 | 0 | 5 |

==== Draw 4 ====
Monday, October 3, 12:00

| Sheet 6 | 1 | 2 | 3 | 4 | 5 | 6 | 7 | 8 | Final |
| Turkey (Polat) | 1 | 0 | 2 | 2 | 1 | 0 | 2 | X | 8 |
| Slovenia (Kremzar) 🔨 | 0 | 1 | 0 | 0 | 0 | 1 | 0 | X | 2 |

| Sheet 7 | 1 | 2 | 3 | 4 | 5 | 6 | 7 | 8 | Final |
| Serbia (Stojanovic) | 1 | 0 | 1 | 0 | 2 | 0 | 3 | 0 | 7 |
| Romania (Novac) 🔨 | 0 | 1 | 0 | 2 | 0 | 3 | 0 | 2 | 8 |

==== Draw 5 ====
Tuesday, October 4, 8:30

| Sheet 3 | 1 | 2 | 3 | 4 | 5 | 6 | 7 | 8 | Final |
| France (Li) | 2 | 5 | 1 | 0 | 4 | 0 | X | X | 12 |
| Serbia (Stojanovic) 🔨 | 0 | 0 | 0 | 1 | 0 | 1 | X | X | 2 |

| Sheet 4 | 1 | 2 | 3 | 4 | 5 | 6 | 7 | 8 | Final |
| Romania (Novac) | 0 | 0 | 0 | 0 | 0 | 2 | 0 | X | 2 |
| Turkey (Polat) 🔨 | 2 | 2 | 1 | 1 | 1 | 0 | 2 | X | 9 |

=== Green Group Results ===
==== Draw 1 ====
Friday, September 30, 18:30

| Sheet 3 | 1 | 2 | 3 | 4 | 5 | 6 | 7 | 8 | Final |
| Croatia (Pennava) | 0 | 0 | 3 | 0 | 1 | 0 | 0 | X | 4 |
| Slovakia (Kajanova) 🔨 | 2 | 4 | 0 | 3 | 0 | 1 | 2 | X | 12 |

| Sheet 4 | 1 | 2 | 3 | 4 | 5 | 6 | 7 | 8 | Final |
| Belgium (Geerts) | 0 | 0 | 0 | 0 | 0 | 0 | 0 | X | 0 |
| Belarus (Kirillova) | 2 | 2 | 1 | 2 | 1 | 1 | 1 | X | 10 |

Saturday, October 1, 20:00

| Sheet 3 | 1 | 2 | 3 | 4 | 5 | 6 | 7 | 8 | Final |
| Belarus (Kirillova) | 1 | 0 | 1 | 0 | 3 | 0 | 1 | 0 | 6 |
| Poland (Ran) | 0 | 1 | 0 | 1 | 0 | 2 | 0 | 3 | 7 |

| Sheet 4 | 1 | 2 | 3 | 4 | 5 | 6 | 7 | 8 | Final |
| Slovakia (Kajanova) | 0 | 0 | 0 | 2 | 1 | 1 | 2 | 0 | 7 |
| Belgium (Geerts) 🔨 | 1 | 1 | 1 | 0 | 0 | 0 | 0 | 2 | 5 |

==== Draw 3 ====
Sunday, October 2, 19:30

| Sheet 3 | 1 | 2 | 3 | 4 | 5 | 6 | 7 | 8 | Final |
| Poland (Ran) 🔨 | 2 | 0 | 2 | 3 | 2 | 0 | 1 | X | 10 |
| Belgium (Geerts) | 0 | 1 | 0 | 0 | 0 | 0 | 0 | X | 1 |

| Sheet 4 | 1 | 2 | 3 | 4 | 5 | 6 | 7 | 8 | Final |
| Belarus (Kirillova) 🔨 | 0 | 3 | 0 | 3 | 1 | 2 | 3 | X | 12 |
| Croatia (Pennava) | 1 | 0 | 1 | 0 | 0 | 0 | 0 | X | 2 |

==== Draw 5 ====
Monday, October 3, 19:30

| Sheet 6 | 1 | 2 | 3 | 4 | 5 | 6 | 7 | 8 | Final |
| Slovakia (Kajanova) 🔨 | 1 | 1 | 0 | 0 | 5 | 0 | 2 | X | 9 |
| Belarus (Kirillova) | 0 | 0 | 2 | 1 | 0 | 1 | 0 | X | 4 |

| Sheet 7 | 1 | 2 | 3 | 4 | 5 | 6 | 7 | 8 | Final |
| Croatia (Pennava) | 0 | 0 | 1 | 0 | 0 | 1 | 0 | X | 2 |
| Poland (Ran) 🔨 | 2 | 1 | 0 | 3 | 2 | 0 | 2 | X | 10 |

==== Draw 7 ====
Tuesday, October 4, 16:00

| Sheet 3 | 1 | 2 | 3 | 4 | 5 | 6 | 7 | 8 | Final |
| Belgium (Geerts) | 0 | 5 | 0 | 3 | 2 | 0 | 3 | X | 13 |
| Croatia (Pennava) 🔨 | 2 | 0 | 1 | 0 | 0 | 1 | 0 | X | 4 |

| Sheet 4 | 1 | 2 | 3 | 4 | 5 | 6 | 7 | 8 | Final |
| Poland (Ran) 🔨 | 1 | 0 | 0 | 1 | 3 | 2 | 0 | X | 7 |
| Slovakia (Kajanova) | 0 | 2 | 0 | 0 | 0 | 0 | 1 | X | 3 |

=== Playoffs ===
Page playoff system
Y1 | France | 4
G1 | Poland | 5
Y2 | Turkey | 2
G2 | Slovakia | 8

Semifinal
Y1 | France | 5
G2 | Slovakia | 7

Gold-medal game
G1 | Poland | 8
G2 | Slovakia | 4

==== Page 1 vs. 2 ====
Thursday, October 6, 12:00

| Sheet 5 | 1 | 2 | 3 | 4 | 5 | 6 | 7 | 8 | Final |
| France (Li) 🔨 | 0 | 1 | 0 | 2 | 0 | 0 | 1 | 0 | 4 |
| Poland (Ran) | 0 | 0 | 2 | 0 | 1 | 1 | 0 | 1 | 5 |

==== Page 3 vs. 4 ====
Thursday, October 6, 12:00

| Sheet 5 | 1 | 2 | 3 | 4 | 5 | 6 | 7 | 8 | Final |
| Turkey (Polat) 🔨 | 1 | 0 | 0 | 0 | 1 | 0 | 0 | X | 2 |
| Slovakia (Kajanova) | 0 | 1 | 2 | 1 | 0 | 2 | 2 | X | 8 |

==== Semifinal ====
Thursday, October 6, 12:00

| Sheet 3 | 1 | 2 | 3 | 4 | 5 | 6 | 7 | 8 | Final |
| France (Li) 🔨 | 0 | 2 | 0 | 3 | 0 | 0 | 0 | 0 | 5 |
| Slovakia (Kajanova) | 0 | 0 | 4 | 0 | 1 | 1 | 0 | 1 | 7 |

==== Gold-medal game ====
Thursday, October 6, 19:30

| Sheet 2 | 1 | 2 | 3 | 4 | 5 | 6 | 7 | 8 | Final |
| Poland (Ran) 🔨 | 2 | 0 | 0 | 1 | 0 | 2 | 3 | X | 8 |
| Slovakia (Kajanova) | 0 | 1 | 1 | 0 | 2 | 0 | 0 | X | 4 |
