= 2014 Continental Cup of Curling =

International curling competition

2014 World Financial Group Continental Cup of Curling
- Host city: Paradise, Nevada
- Arena: Orleans Arena
- Dates: January 16–19
- Attendance: 51,215
- Winner: Team North America
Score Breakdown
Discipline	NA	World
Team Round 1	1	2
Mixed Doubles Round 1	2	1
Team Round 2	3	0
Team Round 3	1.5	1.5
Singles	1	5
Team Round 4	2.5	0.5
Mixed Doubles Round 2	2	1
Team Round 5	2	1
Team Round 6	2.5	0.5
Skins Round 1	6.5	8.5
Skins Round 2	12	3
Total	36	24

The 2014 Continental Cup of Curling was held from January 16 to 19 at the Orleans Arena in Paradise, Nevada, a suburb of Las Vegas. This edition of the Continental Cup of Curling, sponsored by World Financial Group, was the first held outside of Canada. The Continental Cup, based on the Ryder Cup of golf, pits teams from North America against teams from the rest of the world. The tournament featured team events, mixed doubles events, singles competitions, and skins competitions, and the brunt of available points was awarded in the skins competitions. TSN broadcast the event, as it has in previous years.

Team North America was represented by Canada Cup champion Jeff Stoughton, Tournament of Hearts champion Rachel Homan, Canadian Olympic Trials champions Jennifer Jones and Brad Jacobs, and the United States' Olympic Trials champions Erika Brown and John Shuster. Team World was represented by reigning women's world champion Eve Muirhead, two-time world silver medalist Margaretha Sigfridsson, Japanese women's national champion Satsuki Fujisawa, reigning men's world champion Niklas Edin, two-time world champion David Murdoch, and two-time European champion Thomas Ulsrud.

Team North America became the first team to win back-to-back titles. Team World and Team North America were square at the beginning of the event. Team North America built a three-point lead with wins in the team games, but Team World turned the tables on Team North America in the singles competition, taking the lead with a dominant performance. Team North America regained their lead with successive wins in the remaining team and mixed doubles games. Team World cut their lead by two points after the first round of skins games, but Team North America dominated the second round of skins play to clinch the cup, extending their overall record to 6–4.

The event was well attended and broke the attendance record of 42,317 set at the 2004 Continental Cup of Curling in Medicine Hat, Alberta. It was the second most attended curling event ever in the United States, behind the 2008 World Men's Curling Championship in Grand Forks, North Dakota. However, most of the fans had flown in from Canada.

== Competition format ==
This edition of the Continental Cup used the same format as that of the previous year. Out of the sixty total points available, a majority of points was needed to win the cup. The mixed doubles, singles, and team games were worth one point each, and ties were worth one half point each to both teams. The skins games were worth a total of five points. Six mixed doubles and six singles games were played, along with eighteen team games and six skins games.

== Teams ==
The teams were selected from the top teams in each region. Six teams from each region competed against each other in the competition. Four teams from Canada earned the right to represent Team North America by virtue of winning certain events, namely the Canada Cup of Curling and the Canadian Olympic Curling Trials/Canadian National Championships (the Brier and the Tournament of Hearts). Two teams from the United States, namely the winners of the 2014 United States Olympic Curling Trials, were chosen to represent North America, and the teams representing Team World were selected by the World Curling Federation.

The teams in the table below have been announced as representatives of their respective regions.

Team	Skip	Third	Second	Lead	Locale
Team; North; America	Erika Brown	Debbie McCormick	Jessica Schultz	Ann Swisshelm	(United States) Madison, Wisconsin
Team; North; America	Rachel Homan	Emma Miskew	Alison Kreviazuk	Lisa Weagle	(Canada) Ottawa, Ontario
Team; North; America	Jennifer Jones	Kaitlyn Lawes	Jill Officer	Dawn McEwen	(Canada) Winnipeg, Manitoba
Team; North; America	Brad Jacobs	Ryan Fry	E. J. Harnden	Ryan Harnden	(Canada) Sault Ste. Marie, Ontario
Team; North; America	John Shuster	Jeff Isaacson	Jared Zezel	John Landsteiner	(United States) Duluth, Minnesota
Team; North; America	Jeff Stoughton	Jon Mead	Reid Carruthers	Mark Nichols	(Canada) Winnipeg, Manitoba
Team; North; America	Coach: (Canada) Rick Lang, Captain: (United States) Steve Brown				
Team; World	Satsuki Fujisawa	Miyo Ichikawa	Chiaki Matsumura	Emi Shimizu	(Japan) Karuizawa
Team; World	Eve Muirhead	Anna Sloan	Vicki Adams	Claire Hamilton	(Scotland) Stirling
Team; World	Maria Prytz (fourth)	Christina Bertrup	Maria Wennerström	Margaretha Sigfridsson (skip)	(Sweden) Umeå
Team; World	Niklas Edin	Sebastian Kraupp (Note: Murdoch replaced Kraupp in Draw 9)	Fredrik Lindberg	Viktor Kjäll	(Sweden) Karlstad
Team; World	David Murdoch	Tom Brewster	Scott Andrews	Michael Goodfellow	(Scotland) Aberdeen
Team; World	Thomas Ulsrud	Torger Nergård	Christoffer Svae	Håvard Vad Petersson	(Norway) Oslo
Team; World	Coach: (Scotland) David Hay, Captain: (Sweden) Peja Lindholm				

== Event summary ==
=== Day 1 ===
Team World and Team North America began the event with team play. Eve Muirhead capitalized on numerous mistakes from Jennifer Jones's rink to steal five points and secure a substantial win. Jeff Stoughton and Thomas Ulsrud played a tight game until Ulsrud scored three in the fourth end, holding the lead to score another point for Team World. Erika Brown and Satsuki Fujisawa played a close game, but a key steal by Brown's team gave them a slight edge, which they held to win after Brown made a draw to the four-foot, allowing Team North America to escape a sweep by Team World.

In the mixed doubles draw, Mark Nichols and Jennifer Jones swept Niklas Edin and Christina Bertrup, stealing five points and winning the game in seven ends. Kaitlyn Lawes made a game-winning draw to give another point to Team North America, defeating Sebastian Kraupp and Maria Prytz with her mixed doubles partner Jeff Stoughton. The United States' Jeff Isaacson and Debbie McCormick ran into some bad situations during their game and were defeated thoroughly by Christoffer Svae and Satsuki Fujisawa, who stole seven points and won with a twelve-point margin. Team North America were able to even the tournament score out at three points apiece.

The evening team draw saw the first sweep of the event by Team North America. Brad Jacobs played Niklas Edin in a rematch of the previous year's world championship game, and scored one in the final end to take a one-point victory. Rachel Homan scored five straight points, of which three were steals, to overcome a three-point deficit against Margaretha Sigfridsson, and John Shuster made an early steal against David Murdoch and built up a two-point lead, which he held to win the game.

=== Day 2 ===
The morning draw consisted of team play. Jennifer Jones found an easy win over Margaretha Sigfridsson, stealing eight points in the first half against Sigfridsson, whose fourth, Maria Prytz, was struggling to make her shots. Niklas Edin scored multiple points in the third and fifth ends against John Shuster, and held his lead to win a point for Team World. Rachel Homan was in the lead against Satsuki Fujisawa coming into the final end, but she flashed her last shot, giving Fujisawa a steal of two. As a result, the game ended as a draw, and Team World split the points with Team North America. Team North America held a three-point lead over Team World after the morning draw.

The singles competition, similar to a skills competition in ice hockey, involved team members from each of the twelve teams attempting six types of shots. Team World was the clear winner in the singles competition, sweeping all but one of the matchups to bounce out to a one-point lead in the tournament. On the women's side, the team skipped by Margaretha Sigfridsson scored the highest total of points at 24 points, while on the men's side, Thomas Ulsrud's team scored the highest total of points at 18 points.

In the evening draw, Team North America regained the lead from Team World, winning two games and splitting one. Erika Brown and Eve Muirhead played a tight game, and in the final end, Brown had a one-point lead from a steal in the sixth end. Muirhead was able to get one point and tie the game. The game between Brad Jacobs and Thomas Ulsrud was also close. Ulsrud had the lead in the final end, but he was unable to remove Jacobs' stones in the center of the house with his last shot, giving Jacobs the win. Jeff Stoughton scored a crucial point in the sixth end and went on to win the game by scoring two in the final end.

=== Day 3 ===
The morning draw consisted of the final draw of mixed doubles, and saw Team North America adding another point to its lead. Emma Miskew and Ryan Fry scored multiple three-point ends against Greg Drummond and Anna Sloan to win the game, and John Shuster and Jessica Schultz won their game against Thomas Ulsrud and Miyo Ichikawa, who struggled to score and gave up nine points in steals. On the other hand, David Murdoch and Eve Muirhead won their game to give Team World a point. They were able to string together three straight stolen points against E. J. Harnden and Rachel Homan, who cut Team World's lead to one point until they gave up two deuces to Team World in the sixth and seventh ends.

In the afternoon, Team World salvaged two half-points from an otherwise dominant Team North America, who looked to sweep all three games. Erika Brown stole five points against Margaretha Sigfridsson, whose team struggled early on, but a critical miss from Brown gave Sigfridsson's fourth, Maria Prytz, a chance to tie the game with a draw for three. Brad Jacobs held an early lead against David Murdoch, but a late comeback from Murdoch, coupled with an imperfect takeout by Jacobs, gave Murdoch a steal of one point and the tie. Team North America won one game on the ice, however. Rachel Homan held an early lead against Eve Muirhead, but Muirhead stole a point to stay alive. She had an open shot to tie the game, but missed, giving Homan the win.

In the evening draw, the North American team limited Team World to one half-point and extended their lead. Jeff Stoughton was able to steal a point from Niklas Edin early in the game. Edin's third Sebastian Kraupp left the game due to illness, and David Murdochreplaced him. Crucial misses by Edin's team led to Stoughton scoring four in the fifth end, giving him a five-point lead which he held to win the game. John Shuster and Thomas Ulsrud traded doubles until Shuster was only able to score one in the seventh end. Shuster was able to force Ulsrud to make a draw for the win, but Ulsrud came up short, giving Shuster a steal of one and tying the game. Jennifer Jones played a tight game against Satisuki Fujisawa, and they were tied going into the last end. Jones capitalized on a miss from Fujisawa to make a double-takeout for one point and the win.

=== Day 4 ===
In the first round of skins play, Team World made a comeback, winning two skins games and narrowing Team North America's lead. Niklas Edin, playing with Torger Nergård in place of his normal third Sebastian Kraupp, played a back-and-forth game with John Shuster, trading one-point skins until the final end, when Edin made a shot for the carry-over and then drew the button for the final point. Rachel Homan and her mixed team of Jon Mead, Alison Kreviazuk, and Reid Carruthers had an advantage over Team World's Tom Brewster, Emi Shimizu, Greg Drummond, and Chiaki Matsumura, winning the first three points. However, Brewster and his team carried over the rest of the points into a draw-to-the-button challenge, which Brewster won, giving him the final two points. Jennifer Jones held an early lead over Margaretha Sigfridsson, but Sigfridsson forced two carryovers and won the game after Jones missed a potential game-tying shot.

The second round of skins play would decide the winner of the Continental Cup. Brad Jacobs faced off against Thomas Ulsrud, and Jacobs dominated the game, taking all but one of the available points. The cup-winning skin was scored in the sixth end of the game, when Ulsrud missed a difficult double-takeout, giving Jacobs the skin of one point. Eve Muirhead held an early lead against Erika Brown, scoring the first three skins, but Brown made a comeback, forcing two carryovers from Muirhead and winning two skins to win the game. With the win for Team North America, Brown became the first four-time Continental Cup winner in Continental Cup history. Jeff Stoughton's mixed team of Emma Miskew, Mark Nichols, and Lisa Weagle shut out David Murdoch and his team of Satsuki Fujisawa, Scott Andrews, and Miyo Ichikawa, capitalizing from mistakes by Murdoch's team and scoring all of the available points in the game.

The final score of the event was 36–24, and the winning team, Team North America, received a purse of CAD$52,000, CAD$2,000 per player, in addition to the skins bonus of CAD$13,000, while the losing team, Team World, received a purse of CAD$26,000, CAD$1,000 per player. The 2014 Continental Cup marked the first time in Continental Cup history that a team defended their title from the previous year.

== Events ==
All times listed are in Pacific Standard Time (UTC−8). The draws for Thursday, Friday, and Saturday were released on Wednesday night, and the draws for Sunday were released on Saturday afternoon.

=== Thursday, January 16 ===
==== Draw 1 ====
Team 8:30 am

Sheet A	1	2	3	4	5	6	7	8	Final	Points
North America (Jones)	0	1	0	0	0	1	0	X	2	0
World (Muirhead) 🔨	1	0	2	3	2	0	4	X	12	1

Sheet B	1	2	3	4	5	6	7	8	Final	Points
North America (Stoughton)	0	1	1	0	1	0	1	0	4	0
World (Ulsrud) 🔨	2	0	0	3	0	1	0	1	7	1

Sheet C	1	2	3	4	5	6	7	8	Final	Points
North America (Brown)	0	0	2	0	1	1	0	1	5	1
World (Fujisawa) 🔨	0	1	0	1	0	0	1	0	3	0

==== Draw 2 ====
Mixed doubles 1:00 pm

Sheet A	1	2	3	4	5	6	7	8	Final	Points
North America (Nichols/Jones)	1	2	2	3	1	0	0	X	9	1
World (Edin/Bertrup) 🔨	0	0	0	0	0	1	1	X	2	0

Sheet B	1	2	3	4	5	6	7	8	Final	Points
North America (Stoughton/Lawes)	2	0	3	1	0	1	0	1	8	1
World (Kraupp/Prytz) 🔨	0	2	0	0	3	0	2	0	7	0

Sheet C	1	2	3	4	5	6	7	8	Final	Points
North America (Isaacson/McCormick)	0	1	0	0	0	0	0	X	1	0
World (Svae/Fujisawa) 🔨	3	0	3	2	2	2	1	X	13	1

==== Draw 3 ====
Team 7:00 pm

Sheet A	1	2	3	4	5	6	7	8	Final	Points
North America (Jacobs) 🔨	0	0	0	3	0	0	0	1	4	1
World (Edin)	0	1	0	0	1	1	0	0	3	0

Sheet B	1	2	3	4	5	6	7	8	Final	Points
North America (Homan)	0	1	0	0	2	2	0	1	6	1
World (Sigfridsson) 🔨	1	0	3	0	0	0	0	0	4	0

Sheet C	1	2	3	4	5	6	7	8	Final	Points
North America (Shuster)	0	1	0	2	0	1	0	1	5	1
World (Murdoch) 🔨	0	0	1	0	1	0	1	0	3	0

=== Friday, January 17 ===
==== Draw 4 ====
Team 8:30 am

Sheet A	1	2	3	4	5	6	7	8	Final	Points
North America (Homan)	0	2	0	1	2	0	0	0	5	½
World (Fujisawa) 🔨	1	0	1	0	0	1	0	2	5	½

Sheet B	1	2	3	4	5	6	7	8	Final	Points
North America (Shuster)	0	1	0	1	0	0	0	X	3	0
World (Edin) 🔨	1	0	3	0	2	1	0	X	7	1

Sheet C	1	2	3	4	5	6	7	8	Final	Points
North America (Jones)	2	0	3	3	0	1	0	X	9	1
World (Sigfridsson) 🔨	0	0	0	0	1	0	2	X	3	0

==== Draw 5 ====
Singles 1:00 pm

Sheet A	Runthrough	Button	Port	Raise	Hit-and-Roll	Double	Total	Points
North America (Jones)	0	5	1	2	4	0	12	0
World (Muirhead)	0	4	5	5	5	0	19	1

Sheet B	Runthrough	Button	Port	Raise	Hit-and-Roll	Double	Total	Points
North America (Homan)	3	1	5	4	5	0	18	0
World (Sigfridsson)	0	5	5	5	4	5	24	1

Sheet C	Runthrough	Button	Port	Raise	Hit-and-Roll	Double	Total	Points
North America (Brown)	0	4	5	3	1	0	13	0
World (Fujisawa)	0	5	5	3	1	5	19	1

Sheet A	Runthrough	Button	Port	Raise	Hit-and-Roll	Double	Total	Points
North America (Jacobs)	5	4	0	2	1	1	13	1
World (Edin)	0	5	5	1	0	0	11	0

Sheet B	Runthrough	Button	Port	Raise	Hit-and-Roll	Double	Total	Points
North America (Stoughton)	0	2	0	3	3	1	9	0
World (Ulsrud)	1	2	5	3	3	4	17	1

Sheet C	Runthrough	Button	Port	Raise	Hit-and-Roll	Double	Total	Points
North America (Shuster)	0	5	4	2	2	0	13	0
World (Murdoch)	4	5	3	3	1	0	16	1

==== Draw 6 ====
Team 7:00 pm

Sheet A	1	2	3	4	5	6	7	8	Final	Points
North America (Stoughton) 🔨	1	0	0	1	0	1	0	2	5	1
World (Murdoch)	0	2	0	0	1	0	1	0	4	0

Sheet B	1	2	3	4	5	6	7	8	Final	Points
North America (Brown) 🔨	0	1	0	1	0	1	0	0	3	½
World (Muirhead)	1	0	1	0	0	0	0	1	3	½

Sheet C	1	2	3	4	5	6	7	8	Final	Points
North America (Jacobs)	0	1	0	0	0	1	0	2	4	1
World (Ulsrud) 🔨	1	0	0	1	0	0	1	0	3	0

=== Saturday, January 18 ===
==== Draw 7 ====
Mixed doubles 8:30 am

Sheet A	1	2	3	4	5	6	7	8	Final	Points
North America (Fry/Miskew) 🔨	3	0	3	0	1	0	3	X	10	1
World (Drummond/Sloan)	0	2	0	1	0	1	0	X	4	0

Sheet B	1	2	3	4	5	6	7	8	Final	Points
North America (Shuster/Schultz)	2	2	0	1	1	2	2	X	10	1
World (Ulsrud/Ichikawa) 🔨	0	0	2	0	0	0	0	X	2	0

Sheet C	1	2	3	4	5	6	7	8	Final	Points
North America (E. J. Harnden/Homan) 🔨	0	0	0	1	1	0	0	X	2	0
World (Murdoch/Muirhead)	1	1	1	0	0	2	2	X	7	1

==== Draw 8 ====
Team 1:00 pm

Sheet A	1	2	3	4	5	6	7	8	Final	Points
North America (Brown)	0	0	1	4	1	0	1	0	7	½
World (Sigfridsson) 🔨	1	2	0	0	0	1	0	3	7	½

Sheet B	1	2	3	4	5	6	7	8	Final	Points
North America (Jacobs) 🔨	0	2	1	0	1	0	0	0	4	½
World (Murdoch)	0	0	0	1	0	0	2	1	4	½

Sheet C	1	2	3	4	5	6	7	8	Final	Points
North America (Homan) 🔨	2	1	0	1	0	0	1	0	5	1
World (Muirhead)	0	0	1	0	1	1	0	1	4	0

==== Draw 9 ====
Team 6:30 pm

Sheet A	1	2	3	4	5	6	7	8	Final	Points
North America (Shuster)	0	0	2	0	2	0	1	1	6	½
World (Ulsrud) 🔨	2	0	0	2	0	2	0	0	6	½

Sheet B	1	2	3	4	5	6	7	8	Final	Points
North America (Jones) 🔨	1	0	2	1	0	1	0	1	6	1
World (Fujisawa)	0	2	0	0	2	0	1	0	5	0

Sheet C	1	2	3	4	5	6	7	8	Final	Points
North America (Stoughton) 🔨	1	0	1	0	4	0	0	X	6	1
World (Edin)	0	0	0	1	0	1	0	X	2	0

=== Sunday, January 19 ===
==== Draw 10 ====
Skins 1:00 pm

Values (points)	½	½	½	½	½	½	1	1	5
Sheet A	1	2	3	4	5	6	7	8	Total
North America (Jones) 🔨	0	X		X		0			1½
World (Sigfridsson)			X		0		X	X	3½

Values (points)	½	½	½	½	½	½	1	1		5
Sheet B	1	2	3	4	5	6	7	8	Button	Total
North America (Homan/Mead/Kreviazuk/Carruthers) 🔨	X	X		X		X		0		3
World (Brewster/Shimizu/Drummond/Matsumura)			0		0		0		X	2

Values (points)	½	½	½	½	½	½	1	1		5
Sheet C	1	2	3	4	5	6	7	8	Button	Total
North America (Shuster)			0	X			X			2
World (Edin) 🔨	0	X			0	X		0	X	3

==== Draw 11 ====
Skins 6:00 pm

Values (points)	½	½	½	½	½	½	1	1	5
Sheet A	1	2	3	4	5	6	7	8	Total
North America (Jacobs) 🔨	X	X		X		X	X		4
World (Ulsrud)			0		0			X	1

Values (points)	½	½	½	½	½	½	1	1	5
Sheet B	1	2	3	4	5	6	7	8	Total
North America (Stoughton/Miskew/Nichols/Weagle)	X	X		X	X		X	X	5
World (Murdoch/Fujisawa/Andrews/Ichikawa) 🔨			0			0			0

Values (points)	½	½	½	½	½	½	1	1	5
Sheet C	1	2	3	4	5	6	7	8	Total
North America (Brown) 🔨				0	X		0	X	3
World (Muirhead)	X	X	X			X			2

== Statistics ==
The statistics for team play, including team skins play, are listed below. The percentages are calculated for each player by rating their shots in each game. Each shot the player attempts is scored out of four based on how well the shot is made.

=== Player percentages ===
==== Men ====
Leads	%
(Canada) Mark Nichols	97
(Sweden) Viktor Kjäll	92
(United States) John Landsteiner	91
(Canada) Ryan Harnden	90
(Scotland) Scott Andrews	87
(Norway) Håvard Vad Petersson	85

Seconds	%
(Canada) Reid Carruthers	90
(Norway) Christoffer Svae	90
(Canada) E. J. Harnden	88
(Sweden) Fredrik Lindberg	86
(Scotland) Greg Drummond	83
(United States) Jared Zezel	80

Thirds	%
(Sweden) Sebastian Kraupp	90
(Canada) Ryan Fry	88
(Canada) Jon Mead	86
(Norway) Torger Nergård	86
(Scotland) Tom Brewster	84
(United States) Jeff Isaacson	81

Skips	%
(Canada) Jeff Stoughton	89
(Scotland) David Murdoch	85
(Canada) Brad Jacobs	83
(Sweden) Niklas Edin	82
(Norway) Thomas Ulsrud	75
(United States) John Shuster	75

==== Women ====
Leads	%
(Canada) Dawn McEwen	91
(Sweden) Margaretha Sigfridsson	90
(Scotland) Claire Hamilton	89
(Canada) Lisa Weagle	89
(United States) Ann Swisshelm	86
(Japan) Emi Shimizu	85

Seconds	%
(Canada) Alison Kreviazuk	90
(Canada) Jill Officer	89
(Sweden) Maria Wennerström	85
(Scotland) Vicki Adams	79
(United States) Jessica Schultz	77
(Japan) Chiaki Matsumura	77

Thirds	%
(Canada) Emma Miskew	87
(United States) Debbie McCormick	82
(Canada) Kaitlyn Lawes	82
(Scotland) Anna Sloan	80
(Sweden) Christina Bertrup	79
(Japan) Miyo Ichikawa	78

Skips	%
(Scotland) Eve Muirhead	83
(Canada) Jennifer Jones	83
(Canada) Rachel Homan	81
(Japan) Satsuki Fujisawa	80
(Sweden) Maria Prytz	70
(United States) Erika Brown	70

=== Team percentages ===
==== Men ====
Team	%
(Canada) Jeff Stoughton	90
(Sweden) Niklas Edin	87
(Canada) Brad Jacobs	87
(Scotland) David Murdoch	85
(Norway) Thomas Ulsrud	84
(United States) John Shuster	82

==== Women ====
Team	%
(Canada) Rachel Homan	87
(Canada) Jennifer Jones	86
(Scotland) Eve Muirhead	83
(Sweden) Margaretha Sigfridsson	81
(Japan) Satsuki Fujisawa	79
(United States) Erika Brown	79

=== Perfect games ===
==== Men ====
Player	Team	Position	Shots	Opponent
Viktor Kjäll	(Sweden) Niklas Edin	Lead	16	(Canada) Brad Jacobs
Mark Nichols	(Canada) Jeff Stoughton	Lead	14	(Sweden) Niklas Edin

==== Women ====
Player	Team	Position	Shots	Opponent
Lisa Weagle	(Canada) Rachel Homan	Lead	16	(Sweden) Margaretha Sigfridsson
