= Veronica Gerbi =

Italian curler

- Curler ♀

Team
- Curling club: CC Dolomiti, Cortina d'Ampezzo

Curling career
- Member Association: Italy
- World Championship: 1 (2012)
- European Championship: 1 (2011)
- Other appearances: European Mixed Championship: 1 (2009)
Medal record
Curling

Veronica Gerbi is an Italian curler.

== Teams ==
=== Women's ===
Season	Skip	Third	Second	Lead	Alternate	Coach	Events
2011–12	Diana Gaspari	Giorgia Apollonio	Chiara Olivieri	Claudia Alverà	Veronica Gerbi	Brian Gray (ECC, WCC); Daniel Rafael (WCC)	ECC 2011 (6th); WCC 2012 (10th)

=== Mixed ===
Season	Skip	Third	Second	Lead	Alternate	Events
2009–10	Lucrezia Salvai	Gianandrea Gallinatto	Veronica Gerbi	Diego Bertoletti	Valentina Cal, Giovanni Battoni	EMxCC 2009 (18th)
