= 2012 World Women's Curling Championship =

- Host city: Lethbridge, Alberta
- Arena: Enmax Centre
- Dates: March 17–25
- Attendance: 55,401
- Winner: Switzerland
- Curling club: Davos CC, Davos
- Skip: Mirjam Ott
- Third: Carmen Schäfer
- Second: Carmen Küng
- Lead: Janine Greiner
- Alternate: Alina Pätz
- Coach: Thomas Lips
- Finalist: Sweden (Margaretha Sigfridsson)

The 2012 World Women's Curling Championship (branded as Ford World Women's Curling Championship 2012 for sponsorship reasons) was held at the Enmax Centre in Lethbridge, Alberta from March 17 to 25. It marked the 12th time that Canada has hosted the World Women's Curling Championship. The 2012 World Women's Championship was one of the curling events that is a qualifier for the curling tournament at the 2014 Winter Olympics.

This edition of the World Women's Championship saw the first South Korean team advance to the playoffs in history. Previously, their best performance was in 2009, when they finished the round-robin in tenth place with a 3–8 win-loss record.

In the final, Switzerland's Mirjam Ott defeated Sweden's Margaretha Sigfridsson after scoring a deuce in the tenth end, wrapping up the game with a score of 7–6. Switzerland won its third gold medal, its first since 1983, when Erika Müller won the world championship. Ott won her first gold medal, while Sigfridsson won her third silver medal.

Scottish skip Eve Muirhead was awarded the Frances Brodie Award, an honour given to a curler at the championships who best exemplified sportsmanship, fair play, honesty, and friendship. Muirhead was nominated by her fellow curlers at the championships.

== Qualification ==
The following nations qualified to participate in the 2012 Ford World Women's Curling Championship:

- Canada (host country)
- One team from the North American zone
  - United States
- Eight teams from the 2011 European Curling Championships
  - Sweden
  - Scotland
  - Russia
  - Denmark
  - Germany
  - Italy
  - Switzerland
  - Czech Republic (Winner of World Challenge Games)
- Two teams from the 2011 Pacific-Asia Curling Championships:
  - China
  - South Korea

== Teams ==
The teams are listed as follows:

Canada	China	Czech Republic
Saville SC, Edmonton Skip: Heather Nedohin; Third: Beth Iskiw; Second: Jessica Mair; Lead: Laine Peters; Alternate: Amy Nixon	Harbin CC, Harbin Skip: Wang Bingyu; Third: Yue Qingshuang; Second: Liu Jinli; Lead: Zhou Yan; Alternate: Sun Yue	CC Zbraslav, Prague Skip: Linda Klímová; Third: Kamila Mošová; Second: Lenka Černovská; Lead: Kateřina Urbanová; Alternate: Sára Jahodová
Denmark	Germany	Italy
Hvidovre CC, Hvidovre Skip: Lene Nielsen; Third: Helle Simonsen; Second: Jeanne Ellegaard; Lead: Maria Poulsen; Alternate: Mette de Neergaard	SC Riessersee, Garmisch-Partenkirchen Fourth: Imogen Oona Lehmann; Skip: Melanie Robillard*; Second: Corinna Scholz; Lead: Stella Heiß; Alternate: Monika Wagner	Dolomiti CC, Cortina d'Ampezzo Skip: Diana Gaspari; Third: Giorgia Apollonio; Second: Chiara Olivieri; Lead: Claudia Alvera; Alternate: Veronica Gerbi
Russia	Scotland	South Korea
Moskvitch CC, Moscow Skip: Anna Sidorova; Third: Liudmila Privivkova; Second: Margarita Fomina; Lead: Ekaterina Galkina; Alternate: Nkeiruka Ezekh	Dunkeld CC, Dunkeld Skip: Eve Muirhead; Third: Anna Sloan; Second: Vicki Adams; Lead: Claire Hamilton; Alternate: Kelly Wood	Gyeonjgido CC, Uijeongbu Skip: Kim Ji-sun; Third: Lee Seul-bee; Second: Shin Mi-sung; Lead: Gim Un-chi; Alternate: Lee Hyun-jung
Sweden	Switzerland	United States
Skellefteå CK, Skellefteå Fourth: Maria Prytz; Third: Christina Bertrup; Second: Maria Wennerström; Skip: Margaretha Sigfridsson; Alternate: Sabina Kraupp	Davos CC, Davos Skip: Mirjam Ott; Third: Carmen Schäfer; Second: Carmen Küng; Lead: Janine Greiner; Alternate: Alina Pätz	St. Paul CC, St. Paul Skip: Allison Pottinger; Third: Nicole Joraanstad; Second: Natalie Nicholson; Lead: Tabitha Peterson; Alternate: Cassandra Potter

*The team's normal skip, Andrea Schöpp, withdrew from the world championships due to a leg injury sustained prior to the championships. Melanie Robillard replaced Schöpp as skip, and threw third stones.

== Round-robin standings ==
Final round-robin standings

Key
Teams to Playoffs
Teams to Tiebreaker

Country	Skip	W	L	PF	PA	Ends Won	Ends Lost	Blank Ends	Stolen Ends	Shot Pct.
Sweden	Margaretha Sigfridsson	8	3	77	51	43	37	20	6	85%
Switzerland	Mirjam Ott	8	3	72	58	45	41	20	9	86%
South Korea	Kim Ji-sun	8	3	75	57	48	39	20	14	83%
Canada	Heather Nedohin	7	4	67	70	44	46	16	15	85%
United States	Allison Pottinger	7	4	74	61	48	43	13	13	86%
Scotland	Eve Muirhead	6	5	67	65	41	43	17	7	83%
Germany	Melanie Robillard	5	6	61	71	43	45	19	7	79%
Denmark	Lene Nielsen	5	6	66	72	46	47	12	10	83%
Russia	Anna Sidorova	4	7	61	70	41	49	18	4	82%
Italy	Diana Gaspari	3	8	59	80	42	47	13	8	78%
China	Wang Bingyu	3	8	68	73	43	48	18	10	84%
Czech Republic	Linda Klímová	2	9	64	83	48	46	9	10	79%

== Round-robin results ==
All times are listed in Mountain Standard Time (UTC-7).

=== Draw 1 ===
Saturday, March 17, 2:00 pm

Sheet A	1	2	3	4	5	6	7	8	9	10	Final
Denmark (Nielsen)	0	0	0	0	1	0	0	2	0	X	3
Germany (Robillard)	0	0	1	0	0	1	2	0	2	X	6

Sheet B	1	2	3	4	5	6	7	8	9	10	Final
Italy (Gaspari)	0	0	0	1	0	1	0	1	0	X	3
Sweden (Sigfridsson)	0	0	2	0	0	0	3	0	4	X	9

Sheet C	1	2	3	4	5	6	7	8	9	10	Final
South Korea (Kim)	0	0	2	0	0	1	0	0	0	X	3
Czech Republic (Klímová)	2	1	0	1	0	0	1	0	1	X	6

Sheet D	1	2	3	4	5	6	7	8	9	10	Final
Scotland (Muirhead)	0	1	0	0	2	0	2	2	0	1	8
Russia (Sidorova)	1	0	2	0	0	1	0	0	3	0	7

=== Draw 2 ===
Saturday, March 17, 7:00 pm

Sheet A	1	2	3	4	5	6	7	8	9	10	Final
Czech Republic (Klímová)	3	0	1	0	0	1	0	1	0	2	8
Italy (Gaspari)	0	1	0	0	2	0	1	0	1	0	5

Sheet B	1	2	3	4	5	6	7	8	9	10	Final
Canada (Nedohin)	1	1	0	1	0	0	2	3	0	0	8
United States (Pottinger)	0	0	2	0	1	1	0	0	2	1	7

Sheet C	1	2	3	4	5	6	7	8	9	10	Final
Switzerland (Ott)	1	0	0	2	2	0	0	1	0	1	7
China (Wang)	0	1	0	0	0	2	0	0	2	0	5

Sheet D	1	2	3	4	5	6	7	8	9	10	Final
South Korea (Kim)	0	1	0	0	2	0	2	1	0	3	9
Sweden (Sigfridsson)	3	0	0	2	0	2	0	0	1	0	8

=== Draw 3 ===
Sunday, March 18, 9:00 am

Sheet B	1	2	3	4	5	6	7	8	9	10	Final
Russia (Sidorova)	1	0	1	0	0	1	0	1	1	0	5
Denmark (Nielsen)	0	2	0	1	1	0	2	0	0	1	7

Sheet C	1	2	3	4	5	6	7	8	9	10	11	Final
Scotland (Muirhead)	0	0	0	0	2	0	0	2	0	2	0	6
Germany (Robillard)	0	0	1	1	0	2	0	0	2	0	1	7

=== Draw 4 ===
Sunday, March 18, 2:30 pm

Sheet A	1	2	3	4	5	6	7	8	9	10	Final
United States (Pottinger)	0	1	0	2	0	2	0	0	2	0	7
Switzerland (Ott)	2	0	2	0	2	0	0	2	0	3	11

Sheet B	1	2	3	4	5	6	7	8	9	10	Final
Sweden (Sigfridsson)	0	2	1	0	2	0	3	0	2	X	10
Czech Republic (Klímová)	1	0	0	1	0	1	0	2	0	X	5

Sheet C	1	2	3	4	5	6	7	8	9	10	Final
Italy (Gaspari)	0	1	1	0	0	1	1	1	0	0	5
South Korea (Kim)	1	0	0	0	3	0	0	0	1	1	6

Sheet D	1	2	3	4	5	6	7	8	9	10	Final
Canada (Nedohin)	0	1	0	2	0	2	0	1	0	1	7
China (Wang)	0	0	1	0	1	0	1	0	2	0	5

=== Draw 5 ===
Sunday, March 18, 7:30 pm

Sheet A	1	2	3	4	5	6	7	8	9	10	Final
Germany (Robillard)	0	1	0	2	0	1	0	0	0	0	4
Russia (Sidorova)	1	0	1	0	1	0	1	0	0	2	6

Sheet B	1	2	3	4	5	6	7	8	9	10	Final
Switzerland (Ott)	0	1	1	0	0	2	1	0	0	0	5
Canada (Nedohin)	2	0	0	0	2	0	0	1	0	1	6

Sheet C	1	2	3	4	5	6	7	8	9	10	Final
China (Wang)	0	1	1	0	1	2	1	1	0	1	8
United States (Pottinger)	1	0	0	2	0	0	0	0	1	0	4

Sheet D	1	2	3	4	5	6	7	8	9	10	Final
Denmark (Nielsen)	0	1	1	1	1	0	0	2	0	X	6
Scotland (Muirhead)	3	0	0	0	0	0	1	0	4	X	8

=== Draw 6 ===
Monday, March 19, 9:00 am

Sheet A	1	2	3	4	5	6	7	8	9	10	Final
Scotland (Muirhead)	0	0	0	0	0	1	1	0	0	X	2
South Korea (Kim)	0	0	0	2	2	0	0	2	1	X	7

Sheet B	1	2	3	4	5	6	7	8	9	10	Final
Russia (Sidorova)	0	0	0	2	0	3	0	1	0	X	6
Italy (Gaspari)	1	1	1	0	1	0	3	0	3	X	10

Sheet C	1	2	3	4	5	6	7	8	9	10	Final
Denmark (Nielsen)	0	2	0	0	2	0	3	0	1	0	8
Czech Republic (Klímová)	2	0	1	1	0	1	0	1	0	1	7

Sheet D	1	2	3	4	5	6	7	8	9	10	Final
Germany (Robillard)	1	0	0	1	0	2	0	X	X	X	4
Sweden (Sigfridsson)	0	3	1	0	1	0	5	X	X	X	10

=== Draw 7 ===
Monday, March 19, 2:00 pm

Sheet A	1	2	3	4	5	6	7	8	9	10	Final
Italy (Gaspari)	0	2	0	1	0	0	0	3	0	1	7
China (Wang)	1	0	3	0	0	0	0	0	1	0	5

Sheet B	1	2	3	4	5	6	7	8	9	10	Final
South Korea (Kim)	0	0	2	0	0	3	2	0	1	X	8
United States (Pottinger)	0	1	0	1	0	0	0	1	0	X	3

Sheet C	1	2	3	4	5	6	7	8	9	10	Final
Sweden (Sigfridsson)	0	0	1	0	2	0	0	2	0	2	7
Switzerland (Ott)	0	1	0	1	0	0	1	0	1	0	4

Sheet D	1	2	3	4	5	6	7	8	9	10	Final
Czech Republic (Klímová)	0	5	0	0	0	0	0	0	1	1	7
Canada (Nedohin)	0	0	2	3	0	1	1	1	0	0	8

=== Draw 8 ===
Monday, March 19, 7:00 pm

Sheet A	1	2	3	4	5	6	7	8	9	10	11	Final
Canada (Nedohin)	0	0	0	0	2	0	2	0	1	2	0	7
Denmark (Nielsen)	0	1	1	1	0	2	0	2	0	0	2	9

Sheet B	1	2	3	4	5	6	7	8	9	10	Final
Switzerland (Ott)	0	2	0	1	1	0	0	0	0	3	7
Germany (Robillard)	0	0	2	0	0	1	0	1	0	0	4

Sheet C	1	2	3	4	5	6	7	8	9	10	Final
United States (Pottinger)	0	2	1	2	0	2	0	X	X	X	7
Scotland (Muirhead)	0	0	0	0	1	0	1	X	X	X	2

Sheet D	1	2	3	4	5	6	7	8	9	10	Final
China (Wang)	0	0	0	2	0	2	0	1	0	0	5
Russia (Sidorova)	0	0	3	0	2	0	1	0	0	1	7

=== Draw 9 ===
Tuesday, March 20, 9:00 am

Sheet A	1	2	3	4	5	6	7	8	9	10	Final
United States (Pottinger)	1	1	0	3	0	0	3	0	0	1	9
Germany (Robillard)	0	0	1	0	0	3	0	2	1	0	7

Sheet B	1	2	3	4	5	6	7	8	9	10	Final
China (Wang)	0	1	0	3	0	1	0	2	0	0	7
Denmark (Nielsen)	0	0	2	0	1	0	1	0	1	1	6

Sheet C	1	2	3	4	5	6	7	8	9	10	Final
Canada (Nedohin)	2	1	0	0	0	2	0	1	0	1	7
Russia (Sidorova)	0	0	1	0	2	0	1	0	1	0	5

Sheet D	1	2	3	4	5	6	7	8	9	10	Final
Switzerland (Ott)	0	0	1	0	1	1	0	1	0	1	5
Scotland (Muirhead)	0	1	0	0	0	0	1	0	2	0	4

=== Draw 10 ===
Tuesday, March 20, 2:00 pm

Sheet A	1	2	3	4	5	6	7	8	9	10	Final
Russia (Sidorova)	0	1	0	0	0	5	0	1	0	X	7
Sweden (Sigfridsson)	0	0	0	1	0	0	1	0	1	X	3

Sheet B	1	2	3	4	5	6	7	8	9	10	Final
Scotland (Muirhead)	2	0	2	0	0	2	0	2	0	X	8
Czech Republic (Klímová)	0	1	0	1	0	0	2	0	1	X	5

Sheet C	1	2	3	4	5	6	7	8	9	10	Final
Germany (Robillard)	0	2	2	0	1	0	1	0	3	X	9
Italy (Gaspari)	0	0	0	2	0	2	0	2	0	X	6

Sheet D	1	2	3	4	5	6	7	8	9	10	11	Final
Denmark (Nielsen)	0	0	2	0	3	0	2	1	0	0	0	8
South Korea (Kim)	0	1	0	3	0	1	0	0	2	1	1	9

=== Draw 11 ===
Tuesday, March 20, 8:00 pm

Sheet A	1	2	3	4	5	6	7	8	9	10	Final
Czech Republic (Klímová)	0	1	0	2	1	0	1	X	X	X	5
Switzerland (Ott)	2	0	6	0	0	1	0	X	X	X	9

Sheet B	1	2	3	4	5	6	7	8	9	10	Final
Sweden (Sigfridsson)	0	0	3	0	3	0	1	1	0	X	8
Canada (Nedohin)	0	1	0	2	0	1	0	0	0	X	4

Sheet C	1	2	3	4	5	6	7	8	9	10	Final
South Korea (Kim)	3	0	0	0	1	0	0	2	0	1	7
China (Wang)	0	0	2	1	0	2	0	0	0	0	5

Sheet D	1	2	3	4	5	6	7	8	9	10	Final
Italy (Gaspari)	0	0	0	0	0	1	0	X	X	X	1
United States (Pottinger)	2	0	1	2	2	0	3	X	X	X	10

=== Draw 12 ===
Wednesday, March 21, 9:00 am

Sheet A	1	2	3	4	5	6	7	8	9	10	Final
South Korea (Kim)	0	0	3	0	1	0	0	1	0	X	5
Canada (Nedohin)	0	2	0	2	0	2	0	0	1	X	7

Sheet B	1	2	3	4	5	6	7	8	9	10	Final
Italy (Gaspari)	0	0	1	0	0	2	1	0	0	X	4
Switzerland (Ott)	0	2	0	1	1	0	0	2	2	X	8

Sheet C	1	2	3	4	5	6	7	8	9	10	Final
Czech Republic (Klímová)	0	1	0	0	0	1	1	0	1	0	4
United States (Pottinger)	1	0	0	1	1	0	0	2	0	1	6

Sheet D	1	2	3	4	5	6	7	8	9	10	Final
Sweden (Sigfridsson)	5	0	0	0	1	0	0	0	1	X	7
China (Wang)	0	0	2	2	0	0	0	1	0	X	5

=== Draw 13 ===
Wednesday, March 21, 2:00 pm

Sheet A	1	2	3	4	5	6	7	8	9	10	11	Final
China (Wang)	0	2	0	0	0	0	2	1	0	2	0	7
Scotland (Muirhead)	1	0	2	1	1	0	0	0	2	0	2	9

Sheet B	1	2	3	4	5	6	7	8	9	10	Final
United States (Pottinger)	0	0	1	1	2	0	1	0	2	X	7
Russia (Sidorova)	0	0	0	0	0	1	0	1	0	X	2

Sheet C	1	2	3	4	5	6	7	8	9	10	Final
Switzerland (Ott)	0	2	0	0	1	0	0	0	1	0	4
Denmark (Nielsen)	0	0	1	2	0	1	0	2	0	1	7

Sheet D	1	2	3	4	5	6	7	8	9	10	Final
Canada (Nedohin)	0	1	0	0	0	3	1	0	0	0	5
Germany (Robillard)	1	0	0	0	2	0	0	1	0	0	4

=== Draw 14 ===
Wednesday, March 21, 7:00 pm

Sheet A	1	2	3	4	5	6	7	8	9	10	Final
Denmark (Nielsen)	0	1	0	0	1	1	0	0	0	2	5
Italy (Gaspari)	0	0	1	1	0	0	0	0	2	0	4

Sheet B	1	2	3	4	5	6	7	8	9	10	Final
Germany (Robillard)	1	0	1	0	0	0	0	2	0	X	4
South Korea (Kim)	0	2	0	1	1	0	2	0	3	X	9

Sheet C	1	2	3	4	5	6	7	8	9	10	Final
Scotland (Muirhead)	0	1	0	0	0	0	0	1	0	0	2
Sweden (Sigfridsson)	0	0	0	1	0	0	0	0	1	1	3

Sheet D	1	2	3	4	5	6	7	8	9	10	Final
Russia (Sidorova)	1	0	2	0	2	0	3	0	0	1	9
Czech Republic (Klímová)	0	1	0	1	0	1	0	2	1	0	6

=== Draw 15 ===
Thursday, March 22, 9:00 am

Sheet A	1	2	3	4	5	6	7	8	9	10	11	Final
Sweden (Sigfridsson)	0	0	0	2	0	0	0	1	0	2	0	5
United States (Pottinger)	0	0	2	0	0	0	2	0	1	0	1	6

Sheet B	1	2	3	4	5	6	7	8	9	10	Final
Czech Republic (Klímová)	0	1	0	2	0	2	0	1	0	X	6
China (Wang)	3	0	3	0	2	0	1	0	2	X	11

Sheet C	1	2	3	4	5	6	7	8	9	10	Final
Italy (Gaspari)	0	0	2	0	1	0	1	1	0	1	6
Canada (Nedohin)	1	1	0	0	0	2	0	0	1	0	5

Sheet D	1	2	3	4	5	6	7	8	9	10	Final
South Korea (Kim)	0	1	0	2	1	0	0	1	0	0	5
Switzerland (Ott)	2	0	1	0	0	0	2	0	0	1	6

=== Draw 16 ===
Thursday, March 22, 2:00 pm

Sheet A	1	2	3	4	5	6	7	8	9	10	Final
Germany (Robillard)	1	0	0	1	0	2	0	0	0	2	6
Czech Republic (Klímová)	0	1	0	0	1	0	0	1	2	0	5

Sheet B	1	2	3	4	5	6	7	8	9	10	Final
Denmark (Nielsen)	0	0	1	0	0	1	X	X	X	X	2
Sweden (Sigfridsson)	2	2	0	2	1	0	X	X	X	X	7

Sheet C	1	2	3	4	5	6	7	8	9	10	Final
Russia (Sidorova)	0	2	0	0	0	0	0	1	0	0	3
South Korea (Kim)	0	0	1	1	0	1	2	0	2	0	7

Sheet D	1	2	3	4	5	6	7	8	9	10	11	Final
Scotland (Muirhead)	1	1	0	0	2	0	2	0	2	0	1	9
Italy (Gaspari)	0	0	0	2	0	2	0	2	0	2	0	8

=== Draw 17 ===
Thursday, March 22, 7:00 pm

Sheet A	1	2	3	4	5	6	7	8	9	10	Final
Switzerland (Ott)	0	0	0	2	0	0	0	2	0	2	6
Russia (Sidorova)	0	0	1	0	1	1	0	0	1	0	4

Sheet B	1	2	3	4	5	6	7	8	9	10	Final
Canada (Nedohin)	0	1	0	0	2	0	0	0	0	X	3
Scotland (Muirhead)	1	0	2	2	0	0	3	0	1	X	9

Sheet C	1	2	3	4	5	6	7	8	9	10	Final
China (Wang)	0	0	0	1	2	0	1	0	1	0	5
Germany (Robillard)	0	1	1	0	0	1	0	1	0	2	6

Sheet D	1	2	3	4	5	6	7	8	9	10	Final
United States (Pottinger)	0	1	0	2	0	3	1	1	0	X	8
Denmark (Nielsen)	1	0	1	0	1	0	0	0	2	X	5

== Tiebreaker ==
Friday, March 23, 2:00 pm

Team	1	2	3	4	5	6	7	8	9	10	Final
Canada (Nedohin)	0	4	0	2	0	1	0	2	0	0	9
United States (Pottinger)	0	0	1	0	2	0	2	0	2	1	8

Player Percentages
Canada		United States	
Laine Peters	92%	Tabitha Peterson	96%
Jessica Mair	94%	Natalie Nicholson	86%
Beth Iskiw	93%	Nicole Joraanstad	86%
Heather Nedohin	95%	Allison Pottinger	80%
Total	93%	Total	87%

== Playoffs ==
Page playoff system
1	Sweden	7
2	Switzerland	6
3	South Korea	4
4	Canada	3

Semifinal
2	Switzerland	9
3	South Korea	6

Gold Medal Game
1	Sweden	5
2	Switzerland	6

Bronze Medal Game
3	South Korea	6
4	Canada	9

=== 1 vs. 2 ===
Friday, March 23, 7:00 pm

Sheet B	1	2	3	4	5	6	7	8	9	10	11	Final
Sweden (Sigfridsson)	2	0	0	1	0	0	1	0	2	0	1	7
Switzerland (Ott)	0	1	1	0	0	1	0	2	0	1	0	6

Player Percentages
Sweden		Switzerland	
Margaretha Sigfridsson	93%	Janine Greiner	94%
Maria Wennerström	90%	Carmen Küng	82%
Christina Bertrup	89%	Carmen Schäfer	88%
Maria Prytz	77%	Mirjam Ott	78%
Total	87%	Total	86%

=== 3 vs. 4 ===
Saturday, March 24, 1:00 pm

Team	1	2	3	4	5	6	7	8	9	10	Final
South Korea (Kim)	0	0	1	0	0	0	1	0	0	2	4
Canada (Nedohin)	0	0	0	1	0	1	0	1	0	0	3

Player Percentages
South Korea		Canada	
Gim Un-chi	91%	Laine Peters	93%
Shin Mi-sung	90%	Jessica Mair	85%
Lee Seul-bee	85%	Beth Iskiw	86%
Kim Ji-sun	89%	Heather Nedohin	85%
Total	89%	Total	87%

=== Semifinal ===
Saturday, March 24, 6:00 pm

Team	1	2	3	4	5	6	7	8	9	10	Final
Switzerland (Ott)	2	0	0	1	0	2	0	0	3	1	9
South Korea (Kim)	0	3	0	0	0	0	1	2	0	0	6

Player Percentages
Switzerland		South Korea	
Janine Greiner	94%	Gim Un-chi	91%
Carmen Küng	81%	Shin Mi-sung	88%
Carmen Schäfer	78%	Lee Seul-bee	78%
Mirjam Ott	74%	Kim Ji-sun	64%
Total	82%	Total	80%

=== Bronze medal game ===
Sunday, March 25, 9:00 am

Team	1	2	3	4	5	6	7	8	9	10	Final
South Korea (Kim)	1	0	0	2	0	1	0	2	0	0	6
Canada (Nedohin)	0	2	1	0	3	0	1	0	1	1	9

Player Percentages
South Korea		Canada	
Gim Un-chi	89%	Laine Peters	83%
Shin Mi-sung	78%	Jessica Mair	83%
Lee Seul-bee	74%	Beth Iskiw	85%
Kim Ji-sun	74%	Heather Nedohin	73%
Total	78%	Total	81%

=== Gold medal game ===
Sunday, March 25, 4:30 pm

Sheet B	1	2	3	4	5	6	7	8	9	10	Final
Sweden (Sigfridsson)	0	0	2	0	0	2	0	0	2	0	6
Switzerland (Ott)	0	0	0	2	1	0	0	2	0	2	7

Player Percentages
Sweden		Switzerland	
Margaretha Sigfridsson	100%	Janine Greiner	89%
Maria Wennerström	89%	Carmen Küng	80%
Christina Bertrup	94%	Carmen Schäfer	90%
Maria Prytz	71%	Mirjam Ott	90%
Total	87%	Total	88%

2012 Ford World Women's Curling Championship Winner
(Switzerland)
Switzerland
3rd title

== Top 5 player percentages ==
Leads	%	Seconds	%	Thirds	%	Skips	%
(Russia) Ekaterina Galkina	91	(Switzerland) Carmen Küng	87	(United States) Nicole Joraanstad	88	(United States) Allison Pottinger	85
(Denmark) Maria Poulsen	90	(Canada) Jessica Mair	85	(Switzerland) Carmen Schäfer	86	(Canada) Heather Nedohin	84
(Canada) Laine Peters	89	(Scotland) Vicki Adams	84	(Canada) Beth Iskiw	84	(Switzerland) Mirjam Ott	84
(United States) Tabitha Peterson	89	(Sweden) Maria Wennerström	84	(Sweden) Christina Bertrup	84	(Sweden) Maria Prytz (Fourth)	84
(Switzerland) Janine Greiner	89	(United States) Natalie Nicholson	83	(South Korea) Lee Seul-bee	84	(South Korea) Kim Ji-sun	80
