= 2011 European Curling Championships =

- Host city: Moscow, Russia
- Arena: Megasport Arena
- Dates: December 2–10
- Men's winner: Norway
- Curling club: Snarøen CC, Oslo
- Skip: Thomas Ulsrud
- Third: Torger Nergård
- Second: Christoffer Svae
- Lead: Håvard Vad Petersson
- Alternate: Thomas Løvold
- Finalist: Sweden (Niklas Edin)
- Women's winner: Scotland
- Skip: Eve Muirhead
- Third: Anna Sloan
- Second: Vicki Adams
- Lead: Claire Hamilton
- Alternate: Kay Adams
- Finalist: Sweden (Margaretha Sigfridsson)

The 2011 Le Gruyère European Curling Championships were held in Moscow, Russia from December 2 to 10. The Group C competitions were held from September 30 to October 8 in Tårnby, Denmark.

Scotland's Eve Muirhead, last year's runner-up, won the gold medal in the women's tournament after defeating last year's champions Sweden, skipped by Margaretha Sigfridsson, in the final in eight ends. Russia's Anna Sidorova won the bronze medal over Denmark's Lene Nielsen. In the men's tournament, Thomas Ulsrud and team from Norway successfully defended their title by defeating Sweden's Niklas Edin. Last year's runners-up Denmark, skipped by Rasmus Stjerne, won the bronze medal after defeating Jiří Snítil of the Czech Republic, who led his team to the Czech Republic's best finish at the European Championships so far.

A total of seven men's and seven women's teams qualified for the 2012 World Championships. On the men's side, Sweden, Norway, Denmark, the Czech Republic, Germany, Scotland, and France (who defeated Russia in the World Challenge Games), qualified for the 2012 Capital One World Men's Curling Championship and will join hosts Switzerland in competition. On the women's side, Scotland, Russia, Denmark, Germany, Italy, Switzerland, and the Czech Republic (who defeated Hungary in the World Challenge Games), qualified for the 2012 Ford World Women's Curling Championship and will join defending champions Sweden in competition.

== Men ==
=== Group A ===
The Group A competitions were contested in Moscow. Ten teams, including the teams advancing from last year's Group B competitions (Italy and Latvia), competed in a round robin. The top four teams moved on to the page playoffs. In the page playoffs, Sweden edged defending champions Norway, while the Czech Republic got a close win over Denmark, last year's runners-up. Norway defeated Czech Republic in the semifinal, sending the Czechs to the bronze medal game. Norway moved to the gold medal game, where they defeated Sweden with skip Thomas Ulsrud's draw against two Swedish stones in the final end, finishing with a final score of 7–6. Denmark also won their rematch with the Czech Republic, defeating them 9–6 in 9 ends.

France, the eighth placed team, played Group B winners Russia in the World Challenge Games, and defeated Russia in a best-of-three series to win the final berth at the 2012 Capital One World Men's Curling Championship.

==== Round-robin standings ====
Final round-robin standings

Key
Countries to Playoffs
Countries to Tiebreakers
Countries relegated to 2012 Group B

Nation	Skip	W	L
Sweden	Niklas Edin	6	3
Norway	Thomas Ulsrud	6	3
Denmark	Rasmus Stjerne	6	3
Switzerland	Sven Michel	5	4
Czech Republic	Jiří Snítil	5	4
Germany	John Jahr	5	4
Scotland	David Murdoch	5	4
France	Thomas Dufour	4	5
Latvia	Ritvars Gulbis	2	7
Italy	Joël Retornaz	1	8

==== Playoffs ====
Page playoff system
1	Sweden	5
2	Norway	4
3	Denmark	8
4	Czech Republic	9

Semifinal
2	Norway	5
4	Czech Republic	2

Gold-medal game
1	Sweden	6
2	Norway	7

Bronze-medal game
4	Czech Republic	6
3	Denmark	9

===== Bronze-medal game =====
Friday, December 9, 20:00

Sheet D	1	2	3	4	5	6	7	8	9	10	Final
Czech Republic (Snítil) 🔨	2	1	0	0	1	0	1	0	1	X	6
Denmark (Stjerne)	0	0	2	2	0	2	0	3	0	X	9

===== Gold-medal game =====
Saturday, December 10, 15:00

Sheet C	1	2	3	4	5	6	7	8	9	10	Final
Sweden (Edin) 🔨	1	0	0	1	0	0	2	0	2	0	6
Norway (Ulsrud)	0	2	1	0	1	1	0	1	0	1	7

=== Group B ===
The Group B competitions were contested in Moscow. Sixteen teams, including the teams advancing from the Group C competitions (Poland and Lithuania), were divided into two groups and competed in a round robin within their own groups. The top two teams from each group moved on to the page playoffs. Hungary, the leader of the Red Group, defeated Ireland, the leader of the Blue Group, sending Ireland to the semifinal. Russia, the second-ranked team in the Red Group, defeated England, the runner-up of the Blue Group, and advanced to the semifinal. Russia moved on to the gold medal game, where they defeated Hungary to win the Group B competitions. Ireland was defeated by England in the bronze medal game.

Russia and Hungary advance to the 2012 Men's Group A competitions, and Russia played France in the World Challenge Games, where France defeated Russia in a best-of-three series to win the final berth at the 2012 Capital One World Men's Curling Championship. Belarus and Croatia were relegated to the 2012 Men's Group C competitions.

==== Round-robin standings ====
Final round-robin standings

Key
Countries to Playoffs
Countries relegated to 2012 Group C

Red Group	Skip	W	L
Hungary	György Nagy	6	1
Russia	Alexey Tselousov	6	1
Austria	Andreas Unterberger	5	2
Finland	Markku Uusipaavalniemi	4	3
Spain	Antonio de Mollinedo	3	4
Lithuania	Tadas Vyskupaitis	2	5
Slovakia	Pavol Pitoňák	1	6
Belarus	Ihar Platonov	1	6

Blue Group	Skip	W	L
Ireland	Robin Gray	6	1
England	Alan MacDougall	6	1
Estonia	Harri Lill	4	3
Poland	Jakub Glowania	4	3
Belgium	Marc Suter	4	3
Wales	Stuart Hills	2	5
Netherlands	Jaap van Dorp	2	5
Croatia	Alen Cadez	0	7

==== Playoffs ====
Page playoff system
B1	Ireland	4
R1	Hungary	6
B2	England	2
R2	Russia	6

Semifinal
B1	Ireland	3
R2	Russia	6

Gold-medal game
R1	Hungary	4
R2	Russia	7

Bronze-medal game
B1	Ireland	4
B2	England	8

===== Bronze-medal game =====
Saturday, December 10, 9:30

Sheet H	1	2	3	4	5	6	7	8	9	10	Final
Ireland (Gray) 🔨	0	2	1	0	1	0	0	0	0	X	4
England (MacDougall)	0	0	0	1	0	1	1	2	3	X	8

===== Gold-medal game =====
Friday, December 9, 13:00

Sheet G	1	2	3	4	5	6	7	8	9	10	Final
Hungary (Nagy)	0	1	0	0	2	0	1	0	0	X	4
Russia (Tselousov) 🔨	2	0	2	0	0	1	0	2	0	X	7

=== Group C ===
The Group C competitions were contested in Tårnby. The nine participating teams competed in one group of nine and played in a round robin. The top two teams, Poland and Lithuania, advanced to Group B. Poland finished with a 7–1 win–loss record, while Lithuania and Turkey, both finishing with 6–2 win–loss records, played for the second qualifying spot in the semifinal, which went to Lithuania. Poland defeated Lithuania narrowly in the Group C Final, winning after a steal in the ninth end, 7–6.

==== Round-robin standings ====
Final round-robin standings

Key
To Group C Final
To Group C Semifinal

Nation	Skip	Win	Loss
Poland	Tomasz Zioło	7	1
Turkey	Ilhan Osmanagaoglu	6	2
Lithuania	Tadas Vyskupaitis	6	2
Iceland	Hallgrimur Valsson	5	3
Luxembourg	Marco Etienne	4	4
Serbia	Marko Stojanovic	3	5
Romania	Allen Coliban	3	5
Greece	Georgios Arampatis	1	7
Slovenia	Zvonimir Sever	1	7

==== Playoffs ====
Semifinal			Gold-medal game
			1	Poland	7
2	Turkey	2	3	Lithuania	6
3	Lithuania	6

===== Gold-medal game =====
Thursday, October 6, 19:30

Sheet 5	1	2	3	4	5	6	7	8	9	Final
Poland (Zioło)	1	0	1	2	0	1	0	1	1	7
Lithuania (Vyskupaitis) 🔨	0	4	0	0	1	0	1	0	0	6

== Women ==
=== Group A ===
The Group A competitions were contested in Moscow. Ten teams, including the teams advancing from last year's Group B competitions (the Czech Republic and Italy), competed in a round robin. The top four teams moved on to the page playoffs. In the page playoffs, defending champions Sweden soundly defeated Denmark, while Scotland, last year's runners-up, won in an extra end over Russia. Scotland then defeated Denmark in the semifinal, which sent Denmark to the bronze medal game. Scotland then stormed past Sweden, winning the gold medal game in eight ends with an 8–2 score. Scotland won their second championship, their first since the inaugural championships in 1975. Russia secured a bronze medal win over Denmark with a five-point 10th end, making the final score 13–7.

The Czech Republic, the eighth placed team, played Group B winners Hungary in the World Challenge Games, and defeated Hungary in a best-of-three series to win the final berth at the 2012 Ford World Women's Curling Championship.

==== Round-robin standings ====
Final round-robin standings

Key
Countries to Playoffs
Countries to Tiebreakers
Countries relegated to 2012 Group B

Nation	Skip	W	L
Sweden	Margaretha Sigfridsson	9	0
Denmark	Lene Nielsen	8	1
Scotland	Eve Muirhead	7	2
Russia	Anna Sidorova	5	4
Germany	Andrea Schöpp	5	4
Italy	Diana Gaspari	3	6
Switzerland	Binia Feltscher	3	6
Czech Republic	Linda Klímová	3	6
Latvia	Ineta Mača	1	8
Norway	Linn Githmark	1	8

==== Playoffs ====
Page playoff system
1	Sweden	12
2	Denmark	6
3	Scotland	9
4	Russia	6

Semifinal
2	Denmark	2
3	Scotland	10

Gold-medal game
1	Sweden	2
3	Scotland	8

Bronze-medal game
2	Denmark	7
4	Russia	13

===== Bronze-medal game =====
Friday, December 9, 20:00

Sheet B	1	2	3	4	5	6	7	8	9	10	Final
Denmark (Nielsen) 🔨	2	0	0	0	0	2	0	0	3	0	7
Russia (Sidorova)	0	2	1	1	2	0	1	1	0	5	13

===== Gold-medal game =====
Saturday, December 10, 10:00

Sheet A	1	2	3	4	5	6	7	8	9	10	Final
Sweden (Sigfridsson) 🔨	0	0	0	0	0	1	0	1	X	X	2
Scotland (Muirhead)	1	1	0	2	3	0	1	0	X	X	8

=== Group B ===
The Group B competitions were contested in Moscow. Ten teams, including the teams advancing from the Group C competitions (Poland and Slovakia), competed in a round robin. The top four teams moved on to the page playoffs. In the page playoffs, Hungary defeated Finland, and Poland defeated Slovakia in a rematch of the Group C final. Poland came close to earning a spot in the Group A competitions, but Finland defeated Poland in the semifinal with a winning point in the 10th end, sending Poland back to play against Slovakia. Hungary secured the top spot in the Group B competitions with a 4–1 win over Finland in nine ends. Slovakia stole their way to a win over Poland in their third matchup, winning in ten ends.

Hungary and Finland advance to the 2012 Women's Group A competitions, and Hungary played the Czech Republic in the World Challenge Games, where France defeated Russia in a best-of-three series to win the final berth at the 2012 Ford World Women's Curling Championship. Ireland and Wales were relegated to the 2012 Men's Group C competitions.

==== Round-robin standings ====
Final round-robin standings

Key
Countries to Playoffs
Countries to Tiebreakers
Countries relegated to 2012 Group C

Nation	Skip	W	L
Finland	Oona Kauste	8	1
Hungary	Ildikó Szekeres	8	1
Poland	Elzbieta Ran	7	2
Austria	Karina Toth	5	4
Estonia	Kristiine Lill	5	4
Slovakia	Gabriela Kajanova	5	4
England	Fiona Hawker	3	6
Spain	Oihane Otaegi	3	6
Ireland	Carolyn Hibberd	1	8
Wales	Laura Beever	0	9

==== Playoffs ====
Page playoff system
1	Hungary	7
2	Finland	4
3	Poland	7
4	Slovakia	3

Semifinal
2	Finland	8
3	Poland	7

Gold-medal game
1	Hungary	4
2	Finland	1

Bronze-medal game
3	Poland	6
4	Slovakia	7

===== Bronze-medal game =====
Saturday, December 10, 9:30

Sheet J	1	2	3	4	5	6	7	8	9	10	Final
Poland (Ran) 🔨	0	0	1	0	0	3	2	0	0	0	6
Slovakia (Kajanova)	1	0	0	1	1	0	0	1	1	2	7

===== Gold-medal game =====
Friday, December 9, 13:00

Sheet K	1	2	3	4	5	6	7	8	9	10	Final
Hungary (Szekeres) 🔨	0	0	0	2	0	1	0	0	1	X	4
Finland (Kauste)	0	0	0	0	0	0	1	0	0	X	1

=== Group C ===
The Group C competitions were contested in Tårnby. The ten participating teams competed in two groups of five and played in a round robin within their own groups. The top two teams from each group then played in a page playoff, and the two finalists, Poland and Slovakia will advance to Group B. Poland defeated France in the 1 vs. 2 playoff game, while Slovakia defeated both Turkey and France en route to reaching the final. Poland defeated Slovakia in the Group C Final in seven ends, 8–4.

==== Round-robin standings ====
Final round-robin standings

Key
Countries to Playoffs

Yellow Group	Skip	W	L
France	Anna Li	4	0
Turkey	Öznur Polat	3	1
Slovenia	Maja Kremzar	2	2
Romania	Crina Novac	1	3
Serbia	Dana Gravara Stojanovic	0	4

Green Group	Skip	W	L
Poland	Elzbieta Ran	4	0
Slovakia	Gabriella Kajanova	3	1
Belarus	Ekaterina Kirillova	2	2
Belgium	Karen Geerts	1	3
Croatia	Iva Pennava	0	4

==== Playoffs ====
Page playoff system
Y1	France	4
G1	Poland	5
Y2	Turkey	2
G2	Slovakia	8

Semifinal
Y1	France	5
G2	Slovakia	7

Gold-medal game
G1	Poland	8
G2	Slovakia	4

===== Gold-medal game =====
Thursday, October 6, 19:30

Sheet 2	1	2	3	4	5	6	7	8	Final
Poland (Ran) 🔨	2	0	0	1	0	2	3	X	8
Slovakia (Kajanova)	0	1	1	0	2	0	0	X	4
