= Skills competition =

Exhibition contests for professional sports

Skills competitions refer to special exhibition contests that take place during all-star games or other special events in professional sports. Generally, they are held the day before the all-star games.

These events seem to serve at least two purposes: the first is to establish bragging rights between athletes for possessing a particular skill needed to succeed in a sport, and the second is to increase ticket and television revenue for the leagues that sponsor the event. Skills contests are often the only events for which tickets are available during an all-star period, because tickets for the games themselves are sold out.

== All-star events ==
=== Baseball ===
The Home Run Derby was first held in 1985 in Minneapolis, Minnesota and was won by Cal Ripken Jr. Today, the Derby usually sells out the all-star stadium and millions watch the event live on ESPN.

Major League Baseball has no other skills event on the All-Star calendar. The other features of the period before the game, which covers Sunday and Monday, include an all-star game of Minor League Baseball players and a celebrity softball game.

=== Basketball ===
The Slam Dunk Contest, Three-point Shootout, and Skills Challenge all take place on the day before the game, which falls on a Saturday. "NBA All-Star Saturday" dates back to 1985, and the original lineup was the slam-dunk event and an old-timers game. Today, the old-timers game has been replaced by the Rookie Challenge, and that game has been held on the Friday before the game every year since 2004. TNT televises all events live in the United States; it also has the live game broadcast on Sunday night.

=== Hockey ===
The NHL SuperSkills Competition takes place the night before the National Hockey League All-Star Game. Component events include a puck-control relay, a short-track speed skating lap, shooting speed, shooting for accuracy, shootouts, and a stylistic breakaway contest. The events are shown on NBC Sports in the U.S. and the CBC in Canada, as is the game itself.

=== Football ===
Until 2007, the Pro Bowl Skills Challenge was held every year in Honolulu, Hawaii, at the hotel the players used. Among the events were a 40-yard dash, throwing for accuracy, kicking for distance, catching, and bench press. There was no live telecast, or, apparently, much publicity; the NFL Pro Bowl official event page did not list this event at all. In 2007, the tape delay broadcast moved from ESPN to NFL Network. The only reason explicitly cited for the discontinuation was that the field where the event was held no longer exists, as the hotel has taken the field back for other purposes. However, the skills competition returned in a condensed format called Pro Bowl Skills Showdown starting in 2017. This hour event features a series of side events leading up to the game itself. It includes some past events like passing and accuracy contests, as well as a creative catching contest. There's also a team dodgeball event among the NFC and AFC players. It is broadcast on ESPN three days before the game and broadcast on ABC the day before the game.
