= Claire Hamilton =

Scottish curler (born 1989)

- Curler
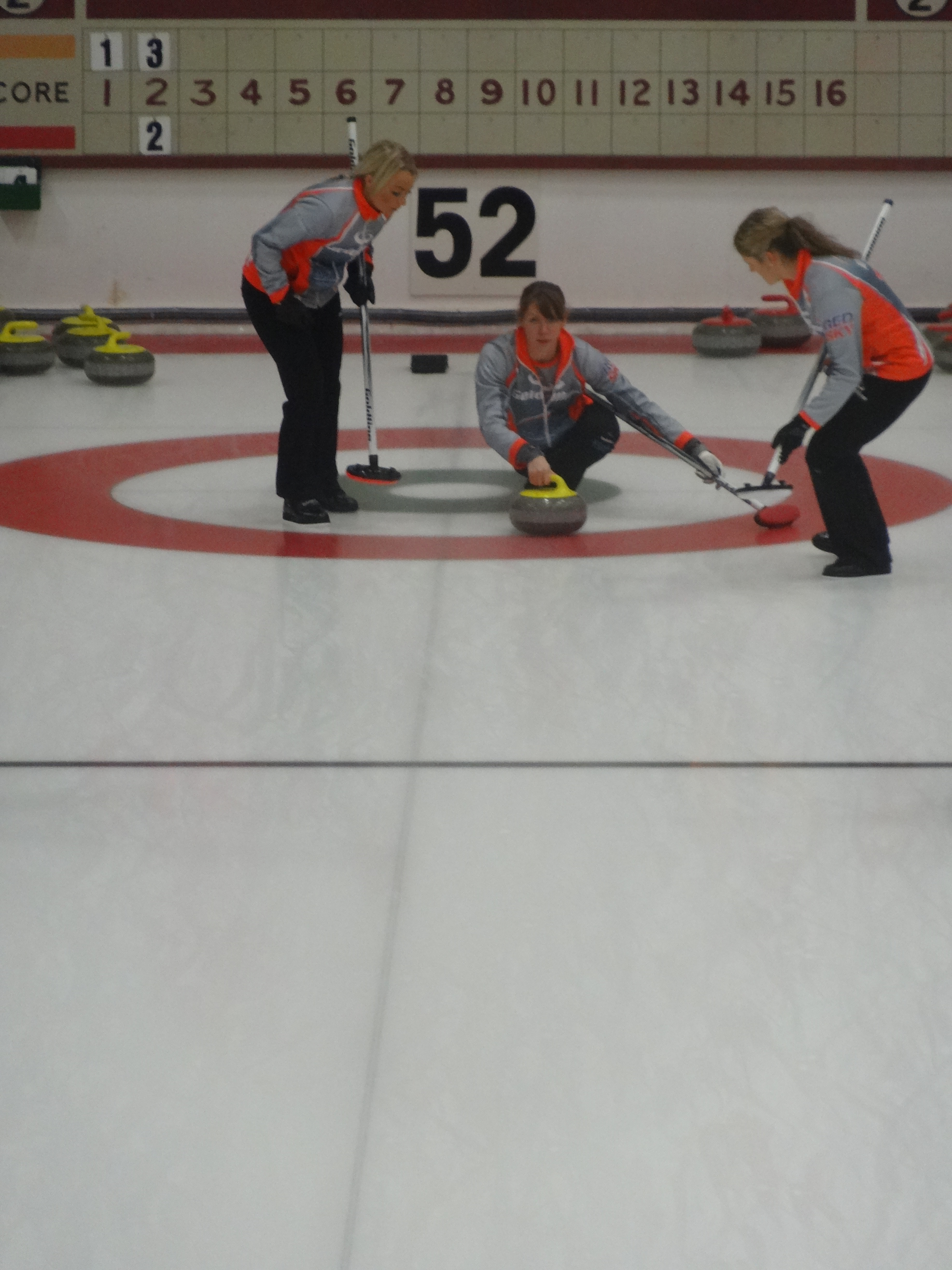
- Hamilton delivers a rock at the 2013 Manitoba Liquor & Lotteries Women's Classic
- Born: 31 January 1989 (age 37); Lockerbie, Scotland

Team
- Curling club: Applegarth & Sibbaldie CC, Lockerbie, SCO

Curling career
- World Championship: 3 (2011, 2012, 2013)
- European Championship: 3 (2011, 2012, 2013)
- Olympic: 1 (2014)
- Grand Slam victories: 2: Autumn Gold (2013), Players' Championship (2013)
Medal record
Curling
Representing Great Britain
Olympic Games
Bronze medal – third place	2014 Sochi
Winter Universiade
Gold medal – first place	2011 Erzurum
Representing Scotland
World Championships
Gold medal – first place	2013 Riga
European Curling Championships
Gold medal – first place	2011 Moscow
Silver medal – second place	2012 Karlstad
Silver medal – second place	2013 Stavanger

Claire Hamilton (born 31 January 1989) is a Scottish curler. She formerly played lead for the rink skipped by Eve Muirhead. Representing Scotland, they were the 2013 World Champions and representing Team GB, they were the 2014 Olympic bronze medallists.

Hamilton was born in Lockerbie, Scotland and was educated at Lockerbie Academy and the University of Strathclyde, where she studied pharmacy. She was a member of the Anna Sloan rink that won a gold medal for Great Britain at the 2011 Winter Universiade, playing as the team's alternate. In March 2011, she played third for Sloan at the 2011 World Championships, along with Vicki Adams, Rhiann MacLeod and Eve Muirhead as alternate. They finished 9th.

Sloan joined forces with Muirhead after that season, with Hamilton becoming the team's lead and Adams playing in second position. They had quick success, winning the gold medal at the 2011 European Curling Championships in Moscow. However, they were not as successful at the 2012 World Championships, placing 6th.

Team Muirhead won gold medals at the 2013 World Curling Championships in Riga, Latvia, with Lauren Gray as alternate. Representing Great Britain, they won a bronze medal at the 2014 Winter Olympics in Sochi, Russia.

In May 2014 Hamilton announced that she was leaving Eve Muirhead's rink. Shortly afterwards she took up cycling, and took a silver medal in the individual pursuit at the Scottish National Track Championships in October 2014.
