= Diana Gaspari =

Italian curler

- Curler
- Born: 6 May 1984 (age 42); Innichen (San Candido), Italy

Team
- Curling club: CC Dolomiti; Cortina d'Ampezzo, Italy
- Mixed doubles partner: Joël Retornaz

Curling career
- Member Association: Italy
- World Championship: 11 (2003, 2004, 2005, 2006, 2007, 2008, 2009, 2012, 2013, 2017, 2018)
- European Championship: 11 (2001, 2002, 2003, 2004, 2005, 2006, 2007, 2008, 2011, 2012, 2017)
- Olympic: 1 (2006)
Medal record
Women's curling
Representing Italy
European Championships
| Silver medal – second place | 2006 Basel |
| Bronze medal – third place | 2017 St Gallen |
World Junior Curling Championships
| Bronze medal – third place | 2003 Flims |

Diana Gaspari (born 6 May 1984 in Innichen (San Candido)) is an Italian curler from Cortina d'Ampezzo. She currently coaches the Italian junior men's team.

Gaspari started playing curling in 1996. She plays in fourth position as a skip and is right-handed.

She made the playoffs at the 2017 European Curling Championships and won the bronze medal, against Switzerland 7–6.

== Personal life ==
Gaspari works as an accountant.
