= Curling at the 2014 Winter Olympics – Statistics =

This is a statistical synopsis of the curling tournaments at the 2014 Winter Olympics.

A total of thirty-three curlers are Olympic veterans. Two female curlers from the inaugural Olympic curling event in Nagano in 1998 returned to the Olympics. Seven female curlers and one male curler who competed in Salt Lake City in 2002 have qualified again. Ten curlers from the Torino Olympics in 2006 are competing at these Olympics, and fifteen women and eighteen men who participated in the 2010 Vancouver Olympics have returned.

== Percentages ==
In curling, each player is graded on their shots on a scale of zero to four. Their cumulative point total is then marked as a percentage out of the total points possible. This score is just for statistical purposes, and has nothing to do with the outcome of the game.

=== Men's tournament ===
Percentages by draw.

==== Leads ====
#	Curler	1	2	3	4	5	6	7	8	9	10	11	12	Total
1	Viktor Kjäll (SWE)	78	91	85		98	91	76		88	97	92		88
2	Ryan Harnden (CAN)	75	83	90		97	71	99		93	85	89		87
3	Simon Gempeler (SUI)	86	80		91	89	88		81	95		81	87	86
3	John Landsteiner (USA)		83	97	89		84	79	83		79	98	85	86
3	Troels Harry (DEN)	91	76		80	79	83		89	98		83	93	86
6	Håvard Vad Petersson (NOR)		74	90	84		85	85	96		69	87	96	85
7	Petr Dron (RUS)	88	84	93		81	89		83	79	88		71	84
7	Zang Jialiang (CHN)	85		75	94	83		78	89	82		86	85	84
9	Michael Goodfellow (GBR)	78	81	76		76	90		75	91	91		88	83
10	Sven Goldemann (GER)			74	74			83	90	89		85	74	81
*	Peter Rickmers (GER)	79				64								72

==== Seconds ====
#	Curler	1	2	3	4	5	6	7	8	9	10	11	12	Total
1	Christoffer Svae (NOR)		91	98	95		94	85	71		79	90	95	89
2	Fredrik Lindberg (SWE)	90	93	86		74	75	86		82	82	90		84
2	Sandro Trolliet (SUI)	90	88		84	76				89		75	85	84
2	Ba Dexin (CHN)	93		80	80	84		90	84	75		82	86	84
5	E. J. Harnden (CAN)	75	89	69		91	81	79		85	85	89		83
6	Jared Zezel (USA)		80	88	86		76	83	81		76	88	80	82
7	Scott Andrews (GBR)	80	83	84		89	94		78	71	70		79	81
8	Mikkel Poulsen (DEN)	75	84		78	85	83		88	77		70	71	79
*	Benoît Schwarz (SUI)						83		75					79
9	Andrey Drozdov (RUS)	68	62	76		81	85		91	74	69		83	77
10	Christopher Bartsch (GER)	65		73	63	81		80	63	83		76	74	73

==== Thirds ====
#	Curler	1	2	3	4	5	6	7	8	9	10	11	12	Total
1	Torger Nergård (NOR)		88	90	95		78	83	85		89	81	88	86
1	Greg Drummond (GBR)	96	83	79		91	91		76	90	86		83	86
3	Ryan Fry (CAN)	79	83	76		88	91	89		89	75	88		84
3	Xu Xiaoming (CHN)	84	80		75	83		80	91	85		90	89	84
5	Sebastian Kraupp (SWE)	93	89	89		69	90	74		83	71	91		83
6	Claudio Pätz (SUI)	83	93	80		83	80		69	89		78	85	82
7	Johnny Frederiksen (DEN)	76	76		80	90	63		93	70		89	68	78
*	Craig Brown (USA)											78		78
8	Jeff Isaacson (USA)		75	88	78		69	80	65		75		70	75
8	Johnny Jahr (GER)	60		83	81	78		71	71	76		76	75	75
*	Alexander Kozyrev (RUS)			78							72		58	69
10	Evgeny Arkhipov (RUS)	73	58			66	80		81	51				68

==== Fourths ====
#	Curler	1	2	3	4	5	6	7	8	9	10	11	12	Total
1	Liu Rui (CHN)	93		88	88	88		89	91	93		80	89	89
2	Niklas Edin (SWE)	79	90	88		80	78	89		91	93	94		87
3	Thomas Ulsrud (NOR)		81	89	88		74	82	85		91	90	83	85
4	David Murdoch (GBR)	100	86	79		88	82		75	80	81		81	84
4	Brad Jacobs (CAN)	82	79	93		89	83	86		85	73	84		84
6	Rasmus Stjerne (DEN)	80	85		66	85	79		70	73		88	98	80
6	Sven Michel (SUI)	74	91		76	75	75		61	88		81	96	80
8	Alexey Stukalskiy (RUS)	80	70	85		78	74		72	68	69		88	76
9	John Shuster (USA)		63	77	86		69	89	69		76	70	74	75
9	Felix Schulze (GER)	70		74	89	71		64	75	78		71	79	75

==== Team totals ====
#	Team	1	2	3	4	5	6	7	8	9	10	11	12	Total
1	Norway		83	92	90		83	84	84		82	87	91	86
1	Sweden	85	91	87		80	84	81		86	86	92		86
3	China	89		80	84	84		84	89	84		84	87	85
4	Canada	78	83	82		91	82	88		88	79	87		84
5	Great Britain	89	83	79		86	89		76	83	82		83	83
5	Switzerland	83	88		83	81	81		72	90		79	88	83
7	Denmark	81	80		76	85	77		85	80		82	82	81
8	United States		75	87	85		75	83	74		77	83	77	80
9	Russia	77	69	83		77	82		82	68	75		78	77
10	Germany	68		76	77	73		79	75	82		77	75	76

=== Women's tournament ===
Percentages by draw.

==== Leads ====
#	Curler	1	2	3	4	5	6	7	8	9	10	11	12	Total
1	Lee Seul-bee (KOR)		97	90	91			91						92
2	Dawn McEwen (CAN)	93	89		81	99	93		86	95	88		96	91
3	Ekaterina Galkina (RUS)	91	91	83	88		94	83		89	98	90		90
4	Zhou Yan (CHN)	98		75	86	83		94	84	88		96	94	89
5	Margaretha Sigfridsson (SWE)	81	91		95	74	80		90	88	90		88	86
5	Ann Swisshelm (USA)	88	86	85	90		76	89		86	83	95		86
7	Claire Hamilton (GBR)	90		77	80	88		80	81	94		92	82	85
*	Um Min-ji (KOR)						67		86		86	88	97	85
8	Maria Poulsen (DEN)	80	89	81		81	83	91		84	78		90	84
9	Michiko Tomabechi (JPN)		80	81	78				95		83	75	84	82
*	Carmen Küng (SUI)					86	86	75						82
10	Janine Greiner (SUI)	68	74	71						78	88		82	77
*	Chinami Yoshida (JPN)						81	54						68

==== Seconds ====
#	Curler	1	2	3	4	5	6	7	8	9	10	11	12	Total
1	Jill Officer (CAN)	86	89		71	93	86		73	85	88		83	84
2	Vicki Adams (GBR)	73		98	84	75		79	81	75		69	78	79
2	Alexandra Saitova (RUS)	78	81	86	66		75	83		81	84	74		79
*	Chinami Yoshida (JPN)		65	78	88						85	81	74	79
4	Maria Wennerström (SWE)	73	64		88	89	70		80	79	74		76	77
4	Jeanne Ellegaard (DEN)	81	66	67		65	81	92		85	75		85	77
4	Jessica Schultz (USA)	78	74	81	71		85	73		74	74	84		77
*	Alina Pätz (SUI)					80	86	71		79	68			77
7	Yue Qingshuang (CHN)	77		86	75	83		78	75	73		61	64	75
7	Carmen Küng (SUI)	68	73	86									73	75
9	Shin Mi-sung (KOR)		79	66	86			59						73
*	Lee Seul-bee (KOR)						70		76					73
*	Kim Ji-sun (KOR)										71	71	74	72
10	Kaho Onodera (JPN)						66	55	68					63

==== Thirds ====
#	Curler	1	2	3	4	5	6	7	8	9	10	11	12	Total
1	Kaitlyn Lawes (CAN)	88	92		81	71	78		88	81	85		83	83
2	Liu Yin (CHN)	84		78	78	78		86	86	80		80	81	81
2	Margarita Fomina (RUS)	74	78	88	75		75	93		90	78	78		81
2	Gim Un-chi (KOR)		88	81	78		91	64	84					81
5	Carmen Schäfer (SUI)	76	70	79		78	78	93		89	82		75	80
6	Christina Bertrup (SWE)	68	84		76	81	76		80	83	78		88	79
7	Yumie Funayama (JPN)		76	75	80		89	77	85		82	63	73	78
8	Helle Simonsen (DEN)	68	81	83		68	64	84		84	85		70	76
8	Anna Sloan (GBR)	75		79	75	73		66	70	81		84		76
*	Lee Seul-bee (KOR)										69	82	71	74
10	Debbie McCormick (USA)	65	78	56	76		79	75		83	82	54		72

==== Fourths ====
#	Curler	1	2	3	4	5	6	7	8	9	10	11	12	Total
1	Jennifer Jones (CAN)	96	100		85	78	86		83	89	74		86	86
2	Maria Prytz (SWE)	79	83		89	74	74		66	89	90		67	79
3	Mirjam Ott (SUI)	76	85	85		88	70	84		79	57		74	78
3	Eve Muirhead (GBR)	61		79	83	88		89	74	71		80	73	78
3	Anna Sidorova (RUS)	73	81	74	75		69	91		70	85	85		78
3	Wang Bingyu (CHN)	59		85	80	78		90	67	80		84	83	78
7	Kim Ji-sun (KOR)		73	74	79		85	66	76					76
8	Ayumi Ogasawara (JPN)		76	81	79		74	70	76		73	89	56	75
9	Lene Nielsen (DEN)	61	85	63		66	81	84		73	78		81	75
*	Gim Un-chi (KOR)										61	96	69	75
10	Erika Brown (USA)	61	70	46	79		83	63		89	77	55		69

==== Team totals ====
#	Team	1	2	3	4	5	6	7	8	9	10	11	12	Total
1	Canada	90	93		80	85	86		82	88	84			86
2	Russia	79	83	83	76		79	87		83	86	82		82
3	China	79		81	80	80		87	78	80		80		81
4	Sweden	75	80		87	79	75		79	84	83			80
4	Great Britain	75		84	80	81		79	77	80		81		80
6	South Korea		84	78	84		78	70	81		72	84		79
7	Switzerland	72	75	80		83	80	78		81	74			78
7	Denmark	72	80	73		70	77	88		81	79			78
9	Japan		74	79	81		78	64	81		81	77		77
10	United States	73	77	67	79		81	75		83	79	72		76
