= Curling at the 2014 Winter Olympics – Qualification =

Qualification to the curling events at the 2014 Winter Olympics was determined through qualification points earned from participation in the world championships and a qualification event.

== Summary ==
=== Men ===
Means of qualification	Berths	Qualified
Host nation	1	Russia
Qualification points via World Championships	7	Canada; Sweden; Great Britain; Norway; Denmark; China; Switzerland
Olympic Qualification Event	2	Germany; United States
Total	10	

=== Women ===
Means of qualification	Berths	Qualified
Host nation	1	Russia
Qualification points via World Championships	7	Sweden; Switzerland; Great Britain; Canada; United States; Denmark; South Korea
Olympic Qualification Event	2	China; Japan
Total	10	

=== Athlete count ===
Nations	Men	Women	Athletes
Canada	X	X	10
China	X	X	10
Denmark	X	X	10
Germany	X		5
Great Britain	X	X	10
Japan		X	5
Norway	X		5
Russia	X	X	10
South Korea		X	5
Sweden	X	X	10
Switzerland	X	X	10
United States	X	X	10
Total: 12 NOCs	50	50	100

== Qualification system ==
Qualification to the curling tournaments at the Winter Olympics was determined through two methods. Nations may qualify teams by earning qualification points from performances at the 2012 and 2013 World Curling Championships. Nations may also qualify teams through an Olympic qualification event to be held in the fall of 2013. Seven nations will qualify teams via World Championship qualification points, while two nations will qualify through the qualification event. As host nation, Russia will qualify teams automatically, thus making a total of ten teams per gender in the curling tournaments.

=== Qualification points ===
The qualification points are allotted based on the nations' final rankings at the World Championships. The points are distributed as follows:

Final rank	1	2	3	4	5	6	7	8	9	10	11	12
Points	14	12	10	9	8	7	6	5	4	3	2	1

Note: Scotland, England and Wales all compete separately in international curling. By an agreement between the curling federations of those three home nations, only Scotland can score Olympic qualification points on behalf of Great Britain.

==== Final standings ====
Key
Nations that have qualified for the Olympic Games
Nations that must qualify through the qualification event

Men's standings
Country	(Switzerland) 2012	(Canada) 2013	Total
Canada	14	12	26
Sweden	10	14	24
Great Britain*	12	10	22
Norway	9	8	17
Denmark	6	9	15
China	7	7	14
Switzerland	4	6	10
United States	5	4	9
New Zealand	8	0	8
Czech Republic	1	5	6
Russia (host)	0	3	3
France	3	0	3
Japan	0	2	2
Germany	2	0	2
Finland	0	1	1

Women's standings
Country	(Canada) 2012	(Latvia) 2013	Total
Sweden	12	12	24
Switzerland	14	8	22
Great Britain*	7	14	21
Canada	10	10	20
United States	8	9	17
Russia (host)	4	7	11
Denmark	5	5	10
South Korea	9	0	9
Germany	6	2	8
Japan	0	6	6
China	2	4	6
Italy	3	3	6
Latvia	0	1	1
Czech Republic	1	0	1

=== Qualification event ===
At the Olympic qualifying event held December 11 to 15, 2013 in Füssen, Germany, the top two teams in the event qualified their nations to participate in the Olympics. The qualification event was open to any nations that earned qualification points at the 2012 or 2013 World Curling Championships (as listed above) or participated at the 2011 World Curling Championships (the South Korea men's team and the Norway women's team).

=== National qualifying events ===
Some countries select their teams through trial qualification tournaments.

- (Canada) 2013 Canadian Olympic Curling Trials
- 2013 United States Olympic Curling Trials
