= 2013 Players' Championship =

Grand Slam of Curling event

- Host city: Toronto, Ontario
- Arena: Mattamy Athletic Centre
- Dates: April 16–21
- Men's winner: (Ontario) Glenn Howard
- Curling club: Coldwater & District CC, Coldwater
- Skip: Glenn Howard
- Third: Wayne Middaugh
- Second: Brent Laing
- Lead: Craig Savill
- Finalist: (Manitoba) Mike McEwen
- Women's winner: (Scotland) Eve Muirhead
- Curling club: Dunkeld CC, Pitlochry
- Skip: Eve Muirhead
- Third: Anna Sloan
- Second: Vicki Adams
- Lead: Claire Hamilton
- Finalist: (Sweden) Margaretha Sigfridsson

The 2013 Players' Championship was a curling tournament held from April 16 to 21 at the Mattamy Athletic Centre (Maple Leaf Gardens) in Toronto, Ontario as part of the 2012–13 World Curling Tour. It was the fourth men's and fifth women's Grand Slam event of the 2012–13 curling season. The event was held in a round robin format.

== Men ==
=== Teams ===
The teams are listed as follows:

Skip	Third	Second	Lead	Locale
Greg Balsdon	Mark Bice	Tyler Morgan	Jamie Farnell	Toronto, Ontario
Jim Cotter	Jason Gunnlaugson	Tyrel Griffith	Rick Sawatsky	Kelowna/Vernon, British Columbia
Niklas Edin	Sebastian Kraupp	Fredrik Lindberg	Viktor Kjäll	Karlstad, Sweden
John Epping	Scott Bailey	Collin Mitchell	David Mathers	Toronto, Ontario
Joe Frans	Ryan Werenich	Jeff Gorda	Shawn Kaufman	Bradford, Ontario
Brad Gushue	Adam Casey	Brett Gallant	Geoff Walker	St. John's, Newfoundland and Labrador
Glenn Howard	Wayne Middaugh	Brent Laing	Craig Savill	Coldwater, Ontario
Brad Jacobs	Ryan Fry	E. J. Harnden	Ryan Harnden	Sault Ste. Marie, Ontario
Mark Kean	Travis Fanset	Patrick Janssen	Tim March	Toronto, Ontario
Kevin Koe	Pat Simmons	Carter Rycroft	Nolan Thiessen	Calgary, Alberta
Steve Laycock	Kirk Muyres	Colton Flasch	Dallan Muyres	Saskatoon, Saskatchewan
Kevin Martin	John Morris	Marc Kennedy	Ben Hebert	Edmonton, Alberta
Mike McEwen	B.J. Neufeld	Matt Wozniak	Denni Neufeld	Winnipeg, Manitoba
Jeff Stoughton	Jon Mead	Reid Carruthers	Mark Nichols	Winnipeg, Manitoba
Thomas Ulsrud	David Nedohin (Note: Torger Nergård, who usually plays third, was not present due to the birth of his child, so Nedohin played in his place.)	Christoffer Svae	Håvard Vad Petersson	Oslo, Norway

=== Round-robin standings ===
Final round-robin standings

Key
Teams to Playoffs
Teams to Tiebreakers

Pool A	W	L	PF	PA
(Manitoba) Jeff Stoughton	3	1	20	18
(Norway) Thomas Ulsrud	2	2	18	18
(Sweden) Niklas Edin	2	2	17	18
(Alberta) Kevin Martin	2	2	18	14
(Saskatchewan) Steve Laycock	1	3	16	22

Pool B	W	L	PF	PA
(Ontario) Brad Jacobs	3	1	20	16
(Alberta) Kevin Koe	2	2	19	17
(British Columbia) Jim Cotter	2	2	15	16
(Ontario) John Epping	2	2	18	21
(Ontario) Joe Frans	1	3	23	25

Pool C	W	L	PF	PA
(Ontario) Glenn Howard	4	0	19	13
(Manitoba) Mike McEwen	3	1	24	18
(Newfoundland and Labrador) Brad Gushue	2	2	19	18
(Ontario) Greg Balsdon	1	3	15	16
(Ontario) Mark Kean	0	4	12	23

=== Round-robin results ===
All draw times are listed in Eastern Daylight Time (UTC−4).

==== Draw 1 ====
Tuesday, April 16, 7:00 pm

Sheet B	1	2	3	4	5	6	7	8	Final
(Alberta) Kevin Martin 🔨	0	1	0	0	1	0	1	2	5
(Norway) Thomas Ulsrud	0	0	0	1	0	0	0	0	1

Sheet D	1	2	3	4	5	6	7	8	9	Final
(Ontario) Glenn Howard 🔨	2	0	1	0	0	1	0	0	1	5
(Ontario) Mark Kean	0	0	0	2	0	0	0	2	0	4

Sheet E	1	2	3	4	5	6	7	8	Final
(Alberta) Kevin Koe 🔨	0	2	1	1	0	1	0	X	5
(Ontario) John Epping	1	0	0	0	1	0	1	X	3

==== Draw 3 ====
Wednesday, April 17, 12:00 pm

Sheet C	1	2	3	4	5	6	7	8	Final
(Alberta) Kevin Koe 🔨	0	1	0	0	1	2	0	X	4
(British Columbia) Jim Cotter	0	0	1	0	0	0	1	X	2

Sheet D	1	2	3	4	5	6	7	8	Final
(Manitoba) Mike McEwen 🔨	2	0	3	0	2	0	3	X	10
(Ontario) Greg Balsdon	0	1	0	2	0	2	0	X	5

Sheet E	1	2	3	4	5	6	7	8	Final
(Sweden) Niklas Edin 🔨	0	2	0	0	0	1	1	0	4
(Norway) Thomas Ulsrud	1	0	0	2	0	0	0	2	5

==== Draw 4 ====
Wednesday, April 17, 3:30 pm

Sheet A	1	2	3	4	5	6	7	8	Final
(Manitoba) Jeff Stoughton 🔨	1	0	0	0	0	1	0	X	2
(Saskatchewan) Steve Laycock	0	0	3	1	1	0	1	X	6

Sheet B	1	2	3	4	5	6	7	8	Final
(Newfoundland and Labrador) Brad Gushue 🔨	0	1	0	1	1	1	1	X	5
(Ontario) Mark Kean	0	0	2	0	0	0	0	X	2

Sheet D	1	2	3	4	5	6	7	8	Final
(Ontario) Brad Jacobs	0	2	0	2	0	2	0	1	7
(Ontario) Joe Frans 🔨	2	0	1	0	1	0	2	0	6

==== Draw 5 ====
Wednesday, April 17, 7:30 pm

Sheet A	1	2	3	4	5	6	7	8	Final
(Ontario) Glenn Howard 🔨	2	0	0	0	0	2	0	X	4
(Ontario) Greg Balsdon	0	1	0	0	1	0	0	X	2

Sheet C	1	2	3	4	5	6	7	8	9	Final
(Alberta) Kevin Martin 🔨	0	1	0	0	0	1	0	1	0	3
(Sweden) Niklas Edin	0	0	1	1	0	0	1	0	1	4

Sheet D	1	2	3	4	5	6	7	8	Final
(British Columbia) Jim Cotter 🔨	3	0	4	0	1	X	X	X	8
(Ontario) John Epping	0	1	0	1	0	X	X	X	2

==== Draw 7 ====
Thursday, April 18, 12:00 pm

Sheet B	1	2	3	4	5	6	7	8	9	Final
(Alberta) Kevin Koe 🔨	0	2	0	2	1	0	0	1	0	6
(Ontario) Joe Frans	3	0	1	0	0	2	0	0	1	7

Sheet C	1	2	3	4	5	6	7	8	9	Final
(Ontario) Glenn Howard 🔨	2	0	0	0	2	0	0	0	1	5
(Newfoundland and Labrador) Brad Gushue	0	0	3	0	0	0	0	1	0	4

Sheet D	1	2	3	4	5	6	7	8	Final
(Saskatchewan) Steve Laycock 🔨	0	0	1	0	1	0	X	X	2
(Norway) Thomas Ulsrud	1	1	0	2	0	4	X	X	8

Sheet E	1	2	3	4	5	6	7	8	Final
(Ontario) Greg Balsdon 🔨	2	1	0	2	0	3	X	X	8
(Ontario) Mark Kean	0	0	1	0	1	0	X	X	2

==== Draw 9 ====
Thursday, April 18, 7:30 pm

Sheet A	1	2	3	4	5	6	7	8	Final
(Ontario) Joe Frans 🔨	1	0	1	0	1	0	1	0	4
(British Columbia) Jim Cotter	0	1	0	1	0	2	0	1	5

Sheet B	1	2	3	4	5	6	7	8	Final
(Newfoundland and Labrador) Brad Gushue 🔨	2	0	1	0	0	1	0	X	4
(Manitoba) Mike McEwen	0	3	0	1	0	0	2	X	6

Sheet C	1	2	3	4	5	6	7	8	Final
(Ontario) Brad Jacobs	0	1	0	0	1	0	X	X	2
(Ontario) John Epping 🔨	2	0	2	0	0	2	X	X	6

Sheet D	1	2	3	4	5	6	7	8	Final
(Manitoba) Jeff Stoughton 🔨	0	1	0	2	1	0	2	0	6
(Sweden) Niklas Edin	1	0	1	0	0	1	0	1	4

Sheet E	1	2	3	4	5	6	7	8	Final
(Alberta) Kevin Martin 🔨	1	0	2	0	0	2	0	1	6
(Saskatchewan) Steve Laycock	0	2	0	1	0	0	1	0	4

==== Draw 11 ====
Friday, April 19, 12:00 pm

Sheet B	1	2	3	4	5	6	7	8	Final
(Manitoba) Jeff Stoughton	0	0	3	0	0	2	0	2	7
(Norway) Thomas Ulsrud 🔨	2	0	0	0	1	0	1	0	4

Sheet C	1	2	3	4	5	6	7	8	Final
(Manitoba) Mike McEwen 🔨	0	0	2	0	1	0	0	2	5
(Ontario) Mark Kean	0	1	0	1	0	2	0	0	4

Sheet D	1	2	3	4	5	6	7	8	Final
(Ontario) Brad Jacobs	1	1	1	1	1	1	X	X	6
(British Columbia) Jim Cotter 🔨	0	0	0	0	0	0	X	X	0

Sheet E	1	2	3	4	5	6	7	8	9	Final
(Ontario) John Epping	0	1	0	1	0	3	0	1	1	7
(Ontario) Joe Frans 🔨	2	0	1	0	1	0	2	0	0	6

==== Draw 12 ====
Friday, April 19, 3:30 pm

Sheet A	1	2	3	4	5	6	7	8	Final
(Newfoundland and Labrador) Brad Gushue 🔨	0	2	0	1	1	2	0	0	6
(Ontario) Greg Balsdon	0	0	2	0	0	0	2	1	5

Sheet B	1	2	3	4	5	6	7	8	Final
(Sweden) Niklas Edin	0	2	1	1	0	1	0	1	6
(Saskatchewan) Steve Laycock 🔨	1	0	0	0	1	0	2	0	4

==== Draw 13 ====
Friday, April 19, 7:30 pm

Sheet B	1	2	3	4	5	6	7	8	9	Final
(Alberta) Kevin Koe	0	1	1	0	0	1	0	1	0	4
(Ontario) Brad Jacobs 🔨	1	0	0	1	1	0	1	0	1	5

Sheet C	1	2	3	4	5	6	7	8	Final
(Manitoba) Jeff Stoughton	1	0	1	0	0	1	0	2	5
(Alberta) Kevin Martin 🔨	0	1	0	1	1	0	1	0	4

Sheet D	1	2	3	4	5	6	7	8	Final
(Ontario) Glenn Howard 🔨	0	2	0	0	0	0	3	X	5
(Manitoba) Mike McEwen	0	0	0	2	1	0	0	X	3

=== Tiebreakers ===
Saturday, April 20, 8:30 am

Team	1	2	3	4	5	6	7	8	Final
(Alberta) Kevin Koe 🔨	0	1	0	1	0	1	0	X	3
(Newfoundland and Labrador) Brad Gushue	0	0	2	0	1	0	3	X	6

Player percentages
(Alberta) Kevin Koe		(Newfoundland and Labrador) Brad Gushue	
Nolan Thiessen	87%	Geoff Walker	89%
Carter Rycroft	80%	Adam Casey	87%
Pat Simmons	79%	Brett Gallant	78%
Kevin Koe	78%	Brad Gushue	85%
Total	81%	Total	84%

Team	1	2	3	4	5	6	7	8	Final
(Alberta) Kevin Martin	0	1	0	1	0	1	0	X	3
(Ontario) John Epping 🔨	0	0	1	0	3	0	3	X	7

Player percentages
(Alberta) Kevin Martin		(Ontario) John Epping	
Ben Hebert	74%	David Mathers	75%
Marc Kennedy	78%	Collin Mitchell	74%
John Morris	80%	Scott Bailey	93%
Kevin Martin	74%	John Epping	85%
Total	77%	Total	82%

Team	1	2	3	4	5	6	7	8	Final
(Sweden) Niklas Edin	0	1	0	2	1	0	0	0	4
(British Columbia) Jim Cotter 🔨	2	0	2	0	0	2	1	1	8

Player percentages
(Sweden) Niklas Edin		(British Columbia) Jim Cotter	
Viktor Kjäll	94%	Rick Sawatsky	91%
Fredrik Lindberg	94%	Tyrel Griffith	84%
Sebastian Kraupp	85%	Jason Gunnlaugson	78%
Niklas Edin	64%	Jim Cotter	72%
Total	84%	Total	81%

=== Playoffs ===
Quarterfinals
(Ontario) Glenn Howard	7
(Newfoundland and Labrador) Brad Gushue	6
(Ontario) Brad Jacobs	9
(Norway) Thomas Ulsrud	5
(Manitoba) Mike McEwen	8
(Ontario) John Epping	2
(Manitoba) Jeff Stoughton	5
(British Columbia) Jim Cotter	4

Semifinals
(Ontario) Glenn Howard	6
(Ontario) Brad Jacobs	4
(Manitoba) Mike McEwen	5
(Manitoba) Jeff Stoughton	2

Final
(Ontario) Glenn Howard	4
(Manitoba) Mike McEwen	3

==== Quarterfinals ====
Saturday, April 20, 3:00 pm

Sheet B	1	2	3	4	5	6	7	8	9	Final
(Ontario) Glenn Howard 🔨	2	0	1	0	1	0	2	0	1	7
(Newfoundland and Labrador) Brad Gushue	0	2	0	1	0	2	0	1	0	6

Player percentages
(Ontario) Glenn Howard		(Newfoundland and Labrador) Brad Gushue	
Craig Savill	89%	Geoff Walker	93%
Brent Laing	92%	Adam Casey	80%
Wayne Middaugh	84%	Brett Gallant	77%
Glenn Howard	84%	Brad Gushue	85%
Total	87%	Total	84%

Sheet D	1	2	3	4	5	6	7	8	Final
(Ontario) Brad Jacobs 🔨	0	2	0	3	0	1	0	3	9
(Norway) Thomas Ulsrud	1	0	1	0	2	0	1	0	5

Player percentages
(Ontario) Brad Jacobs		(Norway) Thomas Ulsrud	
Ryan Harnden	89%	Håvard Vad Petersson	72%
E. J. Harnden	79%	Christoffer Svae	80%
Ryan Fry	92%	David Nedohin	81%
Brad Jacobs	85%	Thomas Ulsrud	80%
Total	86%	Total	78%

Sheet C	1	2	3	4	5	6	7	8	Final
(Manitoba) Mike McEwen 🔨	2	0	0	2	0	4	X	X	8
(Ontario) John Epping	0	1	0	0	1	0	X	X	2

Player percentages
(Manitoba) Mike McEwen		(Ontario) John Epping	
Denni Neufeld	83%	David Mathers	85%
Matt Wozniak	100%	Collin Mitchell	54%
B. J. Neufeld	88%	Scott Bailey	79%
Mike McEwen	94%	John Epping	75%
Total	92%	Total	73%

Sheet E	1	2	3	4	5	6	7	8	9	Final
(Manitoba) Jeff Stoughton 🔨	1	1	0	0	0	0	2	0	1	5
(British Columbia) Jim Cotter	0	0	2	0	0	0	0	2	0	4

Player percentages
(Manitoba) Jeff Stoughton		(British Columbia) Jim Cotter	
Mark Nichols	84%	Rick Sawatsky	95%
Reid Carruthers	100%	Tyrel Griffith	86%
Jon Mead	99%	Jason Gunnlaugson	77%
Jeff Stoughton	90%	Jim Cotter	78%
Total	93%	Total	84%

==== Semifinals ====
Saturday, April 20, 7:30 pm

Team	1	2	3	4	5	6	7	8	Final
(Ontario) Glenn Howard 🔨	2	0	2	0	1	0	1	X	6
(Ontario) Brad Jacobs	0	1	0	1	0	2	0	X	4

Player percentages
(Ontario) Glenn Howard		(Ontario) Brad Jacobs	
Craig Savill	100%	Ryan Harnden	88%
Brent Laing	100%	E. J. Harnden	63%
Wayne Middaugh	90%	Ryan Fry	93%
Glenn Howard	84%	Brad Jacobs	76%
Total	94%	Total	80%

Team	1	2	3	4	5	6	7	8	Final
(Manitoba) Mike McEwen	1	0	1	0	1	0	2	X	5
(Manitoba) Jeff Stoughton 🔨	0	1	0	0	0	1	0	X	2

Player percentages
(Manitoba) Mike McEwen		(Manitoba) Jeff Stoughton	
Denni Neufeld	93%	Mark Nichols	95%
Matt Wozniak	74%	Reid Carruthers	82%
B. J. Neufeld	96%	Jon Mead	88%
Mike McEwen	88%	Jeff Stoughton	69%
Total	87%	Total	84%

==== Final ====
Sunday, April 21, 1:00 pm

Team	1	2	3	4	5	6	7	8	Final
(Ontario) Glenn Howard 🔨	0	0	1	1	0	0	0	2	4
(Manitoba) Mike McEwen	1	0	0	0	0	1	1	0	3

Player percentages
(Ontario) Glenn Howard		(Manitoba) Mike McEwen	
Craig Savill	95%	Denni Neufeld	80%
Brent Laing	85%	Matt Wozniak	82%
Wayne Middaugh	94%	B. J. Neufeld	84%
Glenn Howard	82%	Mike McEwen	83%
Total	89%	Total	82%

== Women ==
=== Teams ===
The teams are listed as follows:

Skip	Third	Second	Lead	Locale
Chelsea Carey	Kristy McDonald	Kristen Foster	Lindsay Titheridge	Winnipeg, Manitoba
Laura Crocker	Sarah Wilkes	Rebecca Pattison	Jen Gates	Edmonton, Alberta
Rachel Homan	Emma Miskew	Alison Kreviazuk	Lisa Weagle	Ottawa, Ontario
Michèle Jäggi	Marisa Winkelhausen	Stéphanie Jäggi	Melanie Barbezat	Bern, Switzerland
Jennifer Jones	Kaitlyn Lawes	Jill Officer	Dawn Askin	Winnipeg, Manitoba
Shannon Kleibrink	Bronwen Webster	Kalynn Park	Chelsey Matson	Calgary, Alberta
Stefanie Lawton	Sherry Anderson	Sherri Singler	Cori Morris	Saskatoon, Saskatchewan
Sherry Middaugh	Jo-Ann Rizzo	Lee Merklinger	Leigh Armstrong	Coldwater, Ontario
Eve Muirhead	Anna Sloan	Vicki Adams	Claire Hamilton	Stirling, Scotland
Heather Nedohin	Beth Iskiw	Jessica Mair	Laine Peters	Edmonton, Alberta
Mirjam Ott	Carmen Schäfer	Carmen Küng	Janine Greiner	Davos, Switzerland
Anna Sidorova	Liudmila Privivkova	Margarita Fomina	Ekaterina Galkina	Moscow, Russia
Maria Prytz (fourth)	Christina Bertrup	Maria Wennerström	Margaretha Sigfridsson (skip)	Skellefteå, Sweden
Renée Sonnenberg	Lawnie MacDonald	Cary-Anne Sallows	Rona Pasika	Edmonton, Alberta
Silvana Tirinzoni	Marlene Albrecht	Esther Neuenschwander	Sandra Gantenbein	Aarau, Switzerland

=== Round-robin standings ===
Final round-robin standings

Key
Teams to Playoffs
Teams to Tiebreakers

Pool A	W	L	PF	PA
(Sweden) Margaretha Sigfridsson	3	1	22	21
(Manitoba) Jennifer Jones	2	2	25	22
(Switzerland) Silvana Tirinzoni	2	2	25	25
(Alberta) Laura Crocker	2	2	23	19
(Ontario) Sherry Middaugh	1	3	21	30

Pool B	W	L	PF	PA
(Ontario) Rachel Homan	3	1	21	15
(Manitoba) Chelsea Carey	2	2	21	22
(Alberta) Heather Nedohin	2	2	20	23
(Alberta) Renée Sonnenberg	2	2	18	16
(Switzerland) Mirjam Ott	1	3	20	23

Pool C	W	L	PF	PA
(Saskatchewan) Stefanie Lawton	4	0	27	19
(Scotland) Eve Muirhead	2	2	23	22
(Russia) Anna Sidorova	2	2	22	21
(Switzerland) Michèle Jäggi	2	2	16	18
(Alberta) Shannon Kleibrink	0	4	14	22

=== Round-robin results ===
All draw times are listed in Eastern Daylight Time (UTC−4).

==== Draw 1 ====
Tuesday, April 16, 7:00 pm

Sheet A	1	2	3	4	5	6	7	8	Final
(Scotland) Eve Muirhead	1	0	2	0	0	1	0	0	4
(Switzerland) Michèle Jäggi 🔨	0	1	0	2	0	0	0	2	5

Sheet C	1	2	3	4	5	6	7	8	Final
(Ontario) Rachel Homan	0	2	1	0	1	0	1	X	5
(Switzerland) Mirjam Ott 🔨	1	0	0	1	0	1	0	X	3

==== Draw 2 ====
Wednesday, April 17, 8:30 am

Sheet A	1	2	3	4	5	6	7	8	Final
(Alberta) Heather Nedohin 🔨	0	1	0	1	0	1	0	2	5
(Manitoba) Chelsea Carey	1	0	1	0	0	0	2	0	4

Sheet B	1	2	3	4	5	6	7	8	9	Final
(Saskatchewan) Stefanie Lawton 🔨	2	0	0	0	2	0	2	1	1	8
(Russia) Anna Sidorova	0	1	0	3	0	3	0	0	0	7

Sheet C	1	2	3	4	5	6	7	8	Final
(Switzerland) Silvana Tirinzoni	0	2	0	1	1	2	0	X	6
(Alberta) Laura Crocker 🔨	2	0	0	0	0	0	1	X	3

Sheet D	1	2	3	4	5	6	7	8	Final
(Manitoba) Jennifer Jones 🔨	0	3	0	2	0	1	0	2	8
(Ontario) Sherry Middaugh	0	0	2	0	1	0	2	0	5

==== Draw 3 ====
Wednesday, April 17, 12:00 pm

Sheet A	1	2	3	4	5	6	7	8	Final
(Switzerland) Mirjam Ott	0	1	0	1	0	0	1	1	4
(Alberta) Renée Sonnenberg 🔨	1	0	0	0	2	0	0	0	3

Sheet B	1	2	3	4	5	6	7	8	Final
(Alberta) Shannon Kleibrink	1	0	1	0	0	0	2	0	4
(Switzerland) Michèle Jäggi 🔨	0	2	0	0	1	1	0	1	5

==== Draw 4 ====
Wednesday, April 17, 3:30 pm

Sheet C	1	2	3	4	5	6	7	8	Final
(Manitoba) Jennifer Jones 🔨	1	1	1	0	0	1	0	0	4
(Sweden) Margaretha Sigfridsson	0	0	0	0	2	0	2	1	5

Sheet E	1	2	3	4	5	6	7	8	Final
(Switzerland) Silvana Tirinzoni	0	2	0	0	2	0	2	0	6
(Ontario) Sherry Middaugh 🔨	2	0	3	0	0	1	0	2	8

==== Draw 5 ====
Wednesday, April 17, 7:30 pm

Sheet B	1	2	3	4	5	6	7	8	Final
(Ontario) Rachel Homan	0	0	1	0	2	3	0	X	6
(Alberta) Renée Sonnenberg 🔨	1	0	0	1	0	0	1	X	3

Sheet E	1	2	3	4	5	6	7	8	Final
(Scotland) Eve Muirhead 🔨	0	2	0	1	1	1	1	X	6
(Alberta) Shannon Kleibrink	2	0	2	0	0	0	0	X	4

==== Draw 6 ====
Thursday, April 18, 8:30 am

Sheet B	1	2	3	4	5	6	7	8	Final
(Alberta) Laura Crocker	0	0	1	0	0	1	1	1	4
(Sweden) Margaretha Sigfridsson 🔨	0	2	0	2	1	0	0	0	5

Sheet C	1	2	3	4	5	6	7	8	Final
(Alberta) Heather Nedohin	0	1	0	0	2	0	0	X	3
(Alberta) Renée Sonnenberg 🔨	0	0	1	1	0	1	3	X	6

Sheet D	1	2	3	4	5	6	7	8	9	Final
(Saskatchewan) Stefanie Lawton	0	1	0	2	0	1	0	0	2	6
(Switzerland) Michèle Jäggi 🔨	0	0	2	0	1	0	0	1	0	4

==== Draw 7 ====
Thursday, April 18, 12:00 pm

Sheet A	1	2	3	4	5	6	7	8	Final
(Manitoba) Chelsea Carey	0	1	0	2	0	2	1	3	9
(Switzerland) Mirjam Ott 🔨	1	0	3	0	2	0	0	0	6

==== Draw 8 ====
Thursday, April 18, 3:30 pm

Sheet A	1	2	3	4	5	6	7	8	Final
(Russia) Anna Sidorova 🔨	0	0	1	1	1	0	2	X	5
(Alberta) Shannon Kleibrink	0	1	0	0	0	2	0	X	3

Sheet B	1	2	3	4	5	6	7	8	Final
(Manitoba) Jennifer Jones 🔨	2	0	1	0	2	0	3	X	8
(Switzerland) Silvana Tirinzoni	0	2	0	1	0	2	0	X	5

Sheet C	1	2	3	4	5	6	7	8	Final
(Saskatchewan) Stefanie Lawton 🔨	1	0	0	1	2	0	2	1	7
(Scotland) Eve Muirhead	0	2	1	0	0	2	0	0	5

Sheet D	1	2	3	4	5	6	7	8	Final
(Sweden) Margaretha Sigfridsson 🔨	2	0	3	0	0	0	0	2	7
(Ontario) Sherry Middaugh	0	1	0	1	2	0	1	0	5

Sheet E	1	2	3	4	5	6	7	8	Final
(Ontario) Rachel Homan 🔨	0	3	0	0	2	0	1	X	6
(Alberta) Heather Nedohin	0	0	0	1	0	2	0	X	3

==== Draw 10 ====
Friday, April 19, 8:30 am

Sheet A	1	2	3	4	5	6	7	8	Final
(Ontario) Sherry Middaugh	0	2	0	0	1	0	0	X	3
(Alberta) Laura Crocker 🔨	1	0	2	2	0	2	2	X	9

Sheet B	1	2	3	4	5	6	7	8	9	Final
(Alberta) Heather Nedohin 🔨	1	4	0	0	1	0	1	0	2	9
(Switzerland) Mirjam Ott	0	0	2	1	0	3	0	1	0	7

Sheet C	1	2	3	4	5	6	7	8	Final
(Russia) Anna Sidorova	0	0	1	0	1	2	0	X	4
(Switzerland) Michèle Jäggi 🔨	0	1	0	0	0	0	1	X	2

Sheet D	1	2	3	4	5	6	7	8	Final
(Saskatchewan) Stefanie Lawton 🔨	2	0	1	0	2	1	0	X	6
(Alberta) Shannon Kleibrink	0	2	0	1	0	0	0	X	3

Sheet E	1	2	3	4	5	6	7	8	Final
(Manitoba) Chelsea Carey 🔨	0	0	1	0	1	1	0	0	3
(Alberta) Renée Sonnenberg	0	1	0	1	0	0	3	1	6

==== Draw 11 ====
Friday, April 19, 12:00 pm

Sheet A	1	2	3	4	5	6	7	8	Final
(Switzerland) Silvana Tirinzoni 🔨	1	0	1	0	4	0	2	X	8
(Sweden) Margaretha Sigfridsson	0	3	0	1	0	1	0	X	5

==== Draw 12 ====
Friday, April 19, 3:30 pm

Sheet C	1	2	3	4	5	6	7	8	Final
(Ontario) Rachel Homan 🔨	0	0	1	1	0	1	1	1	5
(Manitoba) Chelsea Carey	2	2	0	0	2	0	0	0	6

Sheet D	1	2	3	4	5	6	7	8	9	Final
(Russia) Anna Sidorova 🔨	3	0	1	0	1	0	0	1	0	6
(Scotland) Eve Muirhead	0	1	0	2	0	1	2	0	2	8

Sheet E	1	2	3	4	5	6	7	8	Final
(Manitoba) Jennifer Jones	0	1	0	2	1	0	1	0	5
(Alberta) Laura Crocker 🔨	2	0	1	0	0	1	0	3	7

=== Tiebreakers ===
Friday, April 19, 7:30 pm

Team	1	2	3	4	5	6	7	8	Final
(Alberta) Renée Sonnenberg	1	0	0	0	1	1	1	X	4
(Switzerland) Silvana Tirinzoni 🔨	0	0	0	1	0	0	0	X	1

Player percentages
(Alberta) Renée Sonnenberg		(Switzerland) Silvana Tirinzoni	
Rona Pasika	77%	Sandra Gantenbein	75%
Cary-Anne Sallows	83%	Esther Neuenschwander	75%
Lawnie MacDonald	81%	Marlene Albrecht	79%
Renée Sonnenberg	92%	Silvana Tirinzoni	62%
Total	83%	Total	73%

Team	1	2	3	4	5	6	7	8	Final
(Manitoba) Jennifer Jones 🔨	0	0	3	0	1	2	0	X	6
(Switzerland) Michèle Jäggi	0	0	0	1	0	0	2	X	3

Player percentages
(Manitoba) Jennifer Jones		(Switzerland) Michèle Jäggi	
Dawn Askin	93%	Melanie Barbezat	94%
Jill Officer	85%	Stéphanie Jäggi	94%
Kaitlyn Lawes	83%	Marisa Winkelhausen	82%
Jennifer Jones	84%	Michèle Jäggi	67%
Total	86%	Total	85%

Saturday, April 19, 8:30 am

Team	1	2	3	4	5	6	7	8	Final
(Alberta) Heather Nedohin 🔨	2	0	0	1	0	1	0	0	4
(Russia) Anna Sidorova	0	0	0	0	2	0	3	1	6

Player percentages
(Alberta) Heather Nedohin		(Russia) Anna Sidorova	
Laine Peters	83%	Ekaterina Galkina	83%
Jessica Mair	79%	Margarita Fomina	75%
Beth Iskiw	80%	Liudmila Privivkova	76%
Heather Nedohin	62%	Anna Sidorova	65%
Total	76%	Total	75%

Team	1	2	3	4	5	6	7	8	Final
(Alberta) Laura Crocker	0	0	2	3	0	0	0	1	6
(Manitoba) Chelsea Carey 🔨	0	2	0	0	2	0	0	0	4

Player percentages
(Alberta) Laura Crocker		(Manitoba) Chelsea Carey	
Jen Gates	89%	Lindsay Titheridge	89%
Rebecca Pattinson	84%	Kristen Foster	76%
Sarah Wilkes	81%	Kristy McDonald	81%
Laura Crocker	87%	Chelsea Carey	76%
Total	85%	Total	80%

=== Playoffs ===
Quarterfinals
(Saskatchewan) Stefanie Lawton	8
(Russia) Anna Sidorova	7
(Scotland) Eve Muirhead	8
(Alberta) Renée Sonnenberg	6
(Sweden) Margaretha Sigfridsson	8
(Alberta) Laura Crocker	3
(Ontario) Rachel Homan	5
(Manitoba) Jennifer Jones	6

Semifinals
(Saskatchewan) Stefanie Lawton	5
(Scotland) Eve Muirhead	6
(Sweden) Margaretha Sigfridsson	8
(Manitoba) Jennifer Jones	4

Final
(Scotland) Eve Muirhead	8
(Sweden) Margaretha Sigfridsson	5

==== Quarterfinals ====
Saturday, April 20, 11:30 am

Sheet B	1	2	3	4	5	6	7	8	9	Final
(Saskatchewan) Stefanie Lawton 🔨	1	1	0	2	0	3	0	0	1	8
(Russia) Anna Sidorova	0	0	2	0	1	0	2	2	0	7

Player percentages
(Saskatchewan) Stefanie Lawton		(Russia) Anna Sidorova	
Cori Morris	82%	Ekaterina Galkina	80%
Sherri Singler	93%	Margarita Fomina	79%
Sherry Anderson	92%	Liudmila Privivkova	85%
Stefanie Lawton	91%	Anna Sidorova	79%
Total	90%	Total	81%

Sheet C	1	2	3	4	5	6	7	8	Final
(Scotland) Eve Muirhead	0	2	0	2	0	3	0	1	8
(Alberta) Renée Sonnenberg 🔨	1	0	2	0	1	0	2	0	6

Player percentages
(Scotland) Eve Muirhead		(Alberta) Renée Sonnenberg	
Claire Hamilton	67%	Rona Pasika	86%
Vicki Adams	78%	Cary-Anne Sallows	74%
Anna Sloan	81%	Lawnie MacDonald	62%
Eve Muirhead	85%	Renée Sonnenberg	81%
Total	78%	Total	76%

Sheet E	1	2	3	4	5	6	7	8	Final
(Sweden) Margaretha Sigfridsson 🔨	3	0	2	0	0	2	1	X	8
(Alberta) Laura Crocker	0	1	0	1	1	0	0	X	3

Player percentages
(Sweden) Margaretha Sigfridsson		(Alberta) Laura Crocker	
Margaretha Sigfridsson	82%	Jen Gates	75%
Maria Wennerström	90%	Rebecca Pattinson	74%
Christina Bertrup	88%	Sarah Wilkes	74%
Maria Prytz	89%	Laura Crocker	63%
Total	87%	Total	71%

Sheet D	1	2	3	4	5	6	7	8	Final
(Ontario) Rachel Homan 🔨	0	0	1	0	2	0	2	0	5
(Manitoba) Jennifer Jones	0	1	0	2	0	2	0	1	6

Player percentages
(Ontario) Rachel Homan		(Manitoba) Jennifer Jones	
Lisa Weagle	95%	Dawn Askin	88%
Alison Kreviazuk	87%	Jill Officer	90%
Emma Miskew	92%	Kaitlyn Lawes	92%
Rachel Homan	80%	Jennifer Jones	92%
Total	88%	Total	90%

==== Semifinals ====
Saturday, April 20, 7:30 pm

Team	1	2	3	4	5	6	7	8	9	Final
(Saskatchewan) Stefanie Lawton 🔨	0	1	0	1	0	3	0	0	0	5
(Scotland) Eve Muirhead	0	0	2	0	0	0	1	2	1	6

Player percentages
(Saskatchewan) Stefanie Lawton		(Scotland) Eve Muirhead	
Marliese Kasner	86%	Claire Hamilton	84%
Sherri Singler	85%	Vicki Adams	79%
Sherry Anderson	80%	Anna Sloan	91%
Stefanie Lawton	65%	Eve Muirhead	74%
Total	79%	Total	82%

Team	1	2	3	4	5	6	7	8	Final
(Sweden) Margaretha Sigfridsson 🔨	2	0	3	0	3	0	X	X	8
(Manitoba) Jennifer Jones	0	2	0	1	0	1	X	X	4

Player percentages
(Sweden) Margaretha Sigfridsson		(Manitoba) Jennifer Jones	
Margaretha Sigfridsson	91%	Dawn Askin	67%
Maria Wennerström	89%	Jill Officer	55%
Christina Bertrup	81%	Kaitlyn Lawes	80%
Maria Prytz	82%	Jennifer Jones	67%
Total	86%	Total	67%

==== Final ====
Sunday, April 21, 9:00 am

Team	1	2	3	4	5	6	7	8	Final
(Scotland) Eve Muirhead	0	3	0	2	0	2	0	1	8
(Sweden) Margaretha Sigfridsson 🔨	1	0	2	0	1	0	1	0	5

Player percentages
(Scotland) Eve Muirhead		(Sweden) Margaretha Sigfridsson	
Claire Hamilton	76%	Margaretha Sigfridsson	83%
Vicki Adams	74%	Maria Wennerström	86%
Anna Sloan	71%	Christina Bertrup	65%
Eve Muirhead	87%	Maria Prytz	68%
Total	77%	Total	75%
