= Sweden at the 2014 Winter Olympics =

- IOC code: SWE
- NOC: Swedish Olympic Committee
- Website: www.sok.se (in Swedish and English)

in Sochi
- Competitors: 106 in 9 sports
- Flag bearers: Anders Södergren (opening); Charlotte Kalla (closing)
- Medals Ranked 14th: Gold 2 Silver 7 Bronze 6 Total 15

Winter Olympics appearances (overview)
- 1924; 1928; 1932; 1936; 1948; 1952; 1956; 1960; 1964; 1968; 1972; 1976; 1980; 1984; 1988; 1992; 1994; 1998; 2002; 2006; 2010; 2014; 2018; 2022; 2026

Sweden competed at the 2014 Winter Olympics in Sochi, Russia, from 7 to 23 February 2014. The Swedish Olympic Committee (Swedish: Sveriges Olympiska Kommitté, SOK) sent 106 athletes to the Games, 61 men and 45 women, to compete in nine sports. 38 of the 98 events had Swedish participation. The youngest athlete in the delegation was freestyle skier Sandra Näslund, at 17 years old. Ice hockey player Daniel Alfredsson, who was at 41 the oldest Swedish athlete at the 2014 Games, became the first Swedish ice hockey player to participate in five Olympic tournaments. 55 Swedish athletes were Olympic debutants. Sweden won 15 medals in total, making the Sochi games Sweden's most successful Winter Games ever in terms of medals. However, the number of gold medals (2) was lower than in the two previous Winter Games.

== Medalists ==
Medals by sport
Sport	1st place, gold medalist(s)	2nd place, silver medalist(s)	3rd place, bronze medalist(s)	Total
Cross-country skiing	2	5	4	11
Curling	0	1	1	2
Ice hockey	0	1	0	1
Freestyle skiing	0	0	1	1
Total	2	7	6	15

Medals by date
Day	Date	1st place, gold medalist(s)	2nd place, silver medalist(s)	3rd place, bronze medalist(s)	Total
Day 1	8 February	0	1	0	1
Day 2	9 February	0	1	0	1
Day 3	10 February	0	0	0	0
Day 4	11 February	0	1	1	2
Day 5	12 February	0	0	0	0
Day 6	13 February	0	1	0	1
Day 7	14 February	0	1	1	2
Day 8	15 February	1	0	0	1
Day 9	16 February	1	0	0	1
Day 10	17 February	0	0	0	0
Day 11	18 February	0	0	0	0
Day 12	19 February	0	0	2	2
Day 13	20 February	0	1	0	1
Day 14	21 February	0	0	2	2
Day 15	22 February	0	0	0	0
Day 16	23 February	0	1	0	1
Total		2	7	6	15

Multiple medalists
Name	Sport	1st place, gold medalist(s)	2nd place, silver medalist(s)	3rd place, bronze medalist(s)	Total
Charlotte Kalla	Cross-country skiing	1	2	0	3
Marcus Hellner	Cross-country skiing	1	1	0	2
Johan Olsson	Cross-country skiing	1	1	0	2
Ida Ingemarsdotter	Cross-country skiing	1	0	1	2
Daniel Richardsson	Cross-country skiing	1	0	1	2
Teodor Peterson	Cross-country skiing	0	1	1	2
Emil Jönsson	Cross-country skiing	0	0	2	2

Medal	Name	Sport	Event	Date
Gold	Anna Haag; Ida Ingemarsdotter; Charlotte Kalla; Emma Wikén	Cross-country skiing	Women's 4×5 km relay	15 February
Gold	Marcus Hellner; Lars Nelson; Johan Olsson; Daniel Richardsson	Cross-country skiing	Men's 4×10 km relay	16 February
Silver	Charlotte Kalla	Cross-country skiing	Women's 15 km skiathlon	8 February
Silver	Marcus Hellner	Cross-country skiing	Men's 30 km skiathlon	9 February
Silver	Teodor Peterson	Cross-country skiing	Men's sprint	11 February
Silver	Charlotte Kalla	Cross-country skiing	Women's 10 km classical	13 February
Silver	Johan Olsson	Cross-country skiing	Men's 15 km classical	14 February
Silver	Christina Bertrup; Agnes Knochenhauer; Maria Prytz; Margaretha Sigfridsson; Maria Wennerström	Curling	Women's tournament	20 February
Silver	Sweden men's national ice hockey team: Daniel Alfredsson; Nicklas Bäckström; Patrik Berglund; Alexander Edler; Oliver Ekman-Larsson; Jhonas Enroth; Jimmie Ericsson; Jonathan Ericsson; Loui Eriksson; Jonas Gustavsson; Carl Hagelin; Niklas Hjalmarsson; Marcus Johansson; Erik Karlsson; Niklas Kronwall; Marcus Krüger; Gabriel Landeskog; Henrik Lundqvist; Gustav Nyquist; Johnny Oduya; Daniel Sedin; Jakob Silfverberg; Alexander Steen; Henrik Tallinder; Henrik Zetterberg	Ice hockey	Men's tournament	23 February
Bronze	Emil Jönsson	Cross-country skiing	Men's sprint	11 February
Bronze	Daniel Richardsson	Cross-country skiing	Men's 15 km classical	14 February
Bronze	Ida Ingemarsdotter; Stina Nilsson	Cross-country skiing	Women's team sprint	19 February
Bronze	Emil Jönsson; Teodor Peterson	Cross-country skiing	Men's team sprint	19 February
Bronze	Anna Holmlund	Freestyle skiing	Women's ski cross	21 February
Bronze	Niklas Edin; Oskar Eriksson; Sebastian Kraupp; Viktor Kjäll; Fredrik Lindberg	Curling	Men's tournament	21 February

== Summary ==
On 8 February, the first competition day, cross-country skier Charlotte Kalla won the first Swedish medal at the Games. She won the silver medal in the women's 15 km skiathlon event, finishing behind Norway's Marit Bjørgen. Snowboarder Sven Thorgren finished in fourth place in the men's slopestyle, just 1.25 points behind the bronze medalist.

The second medal came the second day, 9 February. Defending Olympic champion Marcus Hellner won the silver medal in the men's 30 km skiathlon behind gold medalist Dario Cologna of Switzerland.

After a chaotic cross-country sprint final on 11 February, Teodor Peterson and Emil Jönsson could pinch a medal each, silver and bronze respective. It was Sweden's third and fourth medal at the Games, all won in cross-country skiing. Marcus Hellner also participated in the final, but finished in sixth place after a fall. In the women's final, Ida Ingemarsdotter finished fifth. Another fifth place was obtained by Emma Dahlström, in the women's slopestyle final.

On 13 February, Charlotte Kalla won her second silver medal of the games, outraced only by gold medal winner Justyna Kowalczyk in the women's 10 km classical. Henrik Harlaut finished 6th in the men's slopestyle.

On 14 February, Johan Olsson and Daniel Richardsson added yet another silver medal, as well as another bronze medal, to the Swedish cross-country team's medal tally in the men's 15 km classical. Richardsson edged Iivo Niskanen of Finland by two tenths of a second to win the bronze.

15 February saw Sweden's first gold medal as Charlotte Kalla overcame a 25-second deficit in the fourth leg of the women's relay, and raced past Krista Lähteenmäki of Finland and Denise Herrmann of Germany in the home stretch. In ice hockey, Sweden's women's team qualified for the semi-finals after defeating Finland with 4–2 in the quarterfinal.

The second gold medal came on 16 February, as Marcus Hellner completed a strong team effort in the men's relay, crossing the finish line almost half a minute ahead of silver medalists Russia. Sweden's men's curling team qualified for the semi-finals after finishing with an 8–1 record in the round robin.

On 17 February, Sweden's women's ice hockey team lost their semifinal against United States with 6–1. Sweden's women's curling team qualified for the semifinals after finishing with a 7–2 record in the round robin.

On 18 February, alpine skier Maria Pietilä Holmner finished 6th in women's giant slalom. Fredrik Lindström also finished 6th, in the men's mass start event in biathlon.

Sweden gained two bronze medals on 19 February, when the team sprint finals were conducted. Stina Nilsson overtook German skier Denise Herrmann in the home stretch to secure her and Ida Ingemarsdotter's bronze medal in the women's event. Emil Jönsson and Teodor Peterson gained the bronze medal in the men's event after German skier Tim Tscharnke fell late in the race. In curling, the Swedish women's team won their semifinal against Switzerland's team with 7–5. The men's team however lost their semifinal against Great Britain's team with 5–6. In ice hockey, the Swedish team won their quarterfinal against Slovenia with 5–0 and qualified for the semifinals.

The first Swedish medal outside the cross-country skiing events was earned on 20 February, after the Swedish women's curling team lost their final game against Canada with the score 3–6. In women's ice hockey, Sweden lost the bronze medal game against Switzerland with 3–4, finishing fourth.

An additional curling medal was earned on 21 February after Niklas Edin's team won the bronze medal game in men's curling after defeating China with 6–4. Anna Holmlund won a bronze, and Sandra Näslund finished 5th, in women's ski cross. Sweden's men's ice hockey team secured a place in the final after defeating Finland with 2–1 in the semi-finals. In alpine skiing, Frida Hansdotter finished 5th and Emelie Wikström 6th in women's slalom.

In the men's ice hockey tournament, Sweden won silver, losing the final match to Canada 0–3 on the final day of the Olympics, on 23 February.

== Alpine skiing ==
Men

Athlete	Event	Run 1		Run 2		Total	
Athlete	Event	Time	Rank	Time	Rank	Time	Rank
Axel Bäck	Slalom	49.02	24	DSQ			
Mattias Hargin	Slalom	47.45	=3	56.15	17	1:43.60	=7
Markus Larsson	Slalom	48.04	10	55.56	13	1:43.60	=7
André Myhrer	Slalom	47.15	2	DNF			
Matts Olsson	Giant slalom	1:23.01	18	1:24.05	10	2:47.06	14

Women

Athlete	Event	Run 1		Run 2		Total	
Athlete	Event	Time	Rank	Time	Rank	Time	Rank
Frida Hansdotter	Giant slalom	1:20.51	15	1:19.34	14	2:39.85	13
Frida Hansdotter	Slalom	54.05	8	51.85	4	1:45.90	5
Sara Hector	Downhill	—N/a				1:44.23	25
Sara Hector	Super-G	—N/a				1:28.71	21
Sara Hector	Combined	1:46.54	26	51.31	5	2:37.85	13
Kajsa Kling	Downhill	—N/a				1:43.69	23
Kajsa Kling	Super-G	—N/a				DNF	
Kajsa Kling	Giant slalom	1:20.47	14	1:19.83	=23	2:40.30	18
Jessica Lindell-Vikarby	Super-G	—N/a				DNF	
Jessica Lindell-Vikarby	Giant slalom	1:18.40	2	1:19.62	20	2:38.02	7
Maria Pietilä Holmner	Giant slalom	1:19.45	7	1:18.37	5	2:37.82	6
Maria Pietilä Holmner	Slalom	DNF		Did not advance			
Anna Swenn-Larsson	Slalom	54.58	12	53.33	19	1:47.91	11
Emelie Wikström	Slalom	54.55	11	51.56	3	1:46.11	6

== Biathlon ==
Athlete	Event	Time	Misses	Rank
Tobias Arwidson	Men's sprint	26:11.8	1 (1+0)	42
Tobias Arwidson	Men's pursuit	35:51.2	0 (0+0+0+0)	28
Tobias Arwidson	Men's individual	54:03.0	1 (1+0+0+0)	41
Carl Johan Bergman	Men's sprint	25:35.9	1 (0+1)	24
Carl Johan Bergman	Men's pursuit	36:20.9	3 (0+1+0+2)	34
Carl Johan Bergman	Men's individual	53:37.5	3 (1+0+0+2)	37
Björn Ferry	Men's sprint	25:36.4	2 (2+0)	25
Björn Ferry	Men's pursuit	36:06.9	3 (1+0+2+0)	30
Björn Ferry	Men's individual	51:18.3	1 (0+0+1+0)	12
Björn Ferry	Men's mass start	43:48.3	3 (1+1+1+0)	12
Fredrik Lindström	Men's sprint	25:21.0	0 (0+0)	18
Fredrik Lindström	Men's pursuit	34:45.7	3 (0+0+1+2)	13
Fredrik Lindström	Men's individual	51:50.2	2 (0+1+0+1)	15
Fredrik Lindström	Men's mass start	43:30.5	2 (0+1+0+1)	6
Tobias Arwidson; Carl Johan Bergman; Björn Ferry; Fredrik Lindström	Men's team relay	1:14:32.0	5 (0+5)	10

Christoffer Eriksson was also selected as a reserve.

== Cross-country skiing ==
Distance
Men

Athlete	Event	Classical		Freestyle		Final		
Athlete	Event	Time	Rank	Time	Rank	Time	Deficit	Rank
Marcus Hellner	15 km classical	—N/a				39:46.9	+1:17.2	10
Marcus Hellner	30 km skiathlon	36:03.1	=9	31:41.4	3	1:08:15.8	+0.4	2nd place, silver medalist(s)
Lars Nelson	15 km classical	—N/a				40:08.8	+1:39.1	15
Lars Nelson	30 km skiathlon	36:00.2	3	32:06.3	10	1:08:37.7	+22.3	10
Johan Olsson	15 km classical	—N/a				38:58.2	+28.5	2nd place, silver medalist(s)
Johan Olsson	50 km freestyle	—N/a				1:47:27.3	+32.1	9
Daniel Richardsson	15 km classical	—N/a				39:08.5	+38.8	3rd place, bronze medalist(s)
Daniel Richardsson	30 km skiathlon	35:59.5	2	32:02.6	9	1:08:31.7	+16.3	7
Daniel Richardsson	50 km freestyle	—N/a				1:47:19.6	+24.4	8
Anders Södergren	30 km skiathlon	36:05.4	14	32:09.6	13	1:08:46.9	+31.5	14
Anders Södergren	50 km freestyle	—N/a				1:47:13.0	+17.8	7
Marcus Hellner; Lars Nelson; Johan Olsson; Daniel Richardsson	4×10 km relay	—N/a				1:28:42.0	+0.0	1st place, gold medalist(s)

Women

Athlete	Event	Classical		Freestyle		Final		
Athlete	Event	Time	Rank	Time	Rank	Time	Deficit	Rank
Anna Haag	10 km classical	—N/a				30:04.5	+1:46.7	18
Anna Haag	30 km freestyle	—N/a				1:12:40.1	+1:34.9	11
Britta Johansson Norgren	15 km skiathlon	19:59.3	24	21:17.2	48	41:51.0	+3:17.4	39
Charlotte Kalla	10 km classical	—N/a				28:36.2	+18.4	2nd place, silver medalist(s)
Charlotte Kalla	15 km skiathlon	19:11.6	3	18:50.3	2	38:35.4	+1.8	2nd place, silver medalist(s)
Charlotte Kalla	30 km freestyle	—N/a				1:16:18.5	+5:13.3	34
Sara Lindborg	10 km classical	—N/a				29:56.2	+1:38.4	15
Sara Lindborg	15 km skiathlon	19:56.1	21	20:01.6	19	40:32.4	+1:58.8	20
Sara Lindborg	30 km freestyle	—N/a				1:18:03.9	+6:58.7	39
Emma Wikén	10 km classical	—N/a				29:38.9	+1:21.1	11
Emma Wikén	15 km skiathlon	19:48.5	14	19:44.9	13	40:07.2	+1:33.6	9
Emma Wikén	30 km freestyle	—N/a				1:12:31.6	+1:26.4	8
Anna Haag; Ida Ingemarsdotter; Charlotte Kalla; Emma Wikén	4×5 km relay	—N/a				53:02.7	+0.0	1st place, gold medalist(s)

Sprint
Men

Athlete	Event	Qualification		Quarterfinal		Semifinal		Final	
Athlete	Event	Time	Rank	Time	Rank	Time	Rank	Time	Rank
Calle Halfvarsson	Sprint	3:33.11	10 Q	3:39.13	4	Did not advance			
Marcus Hellner	Sprint	3:35.38	15 Q	3:33.62	3 q	3:36.98	4 q	5:24.31	6
Emil Jönsson	Sprint	3:30.77	5 Q	3:33.20	1 Q	3:37.43	2 Q	3:58.13	3rd place, bronze medalist(s)
Teodor Peterson	Sprint	3:31.43	6 Q	3:33.34	2 Q	3:36.48	2 Q	3:39.61	2nd place, silver medalist(s)
Emil Jönsson; Teodor Peterson	Team sprint	—N/a				23:28.22	3 q	23:30.01	3rd place, bronze medalist(s)

Women

Athlete	Event	Qualification		Quarterfinal		Semifinal		Final	
Athlete	Event	Time	Rank	Time	Rank	Time	Rank	Time	Rank
Hanna Erikson	Sprint	2:48.83	52	Did not advance					
Ida Ingemarsdotter	Sprint	2:34.16	5 Q	2:36.64	2 Q	2:36.05	3 q	2:42.04	5
Britta Johansson Norgren	Sprint	2:35.98	15 Q	2:37.86	3	Did not advance			
Stina Nilsson	Sprint	2:35.37	10 Q	2:34.01	2 Q	2:36.42	5	Did not advance	
Ida Ingemarsdotter; Stina Nilsson	Team sprint	—N/a				16:48.76	2 Q	16:23.82	3rd place, bronze medalist(s)

Simon Persson was also selected but did not participate in any of the events.

== Curling ==
Summary

Team	Event	Group stage										Tiebreaker	Semifinal	Final / BM	
Team	Event	Opposition Score	Opposition Score	Opposition Score	Opposition Score	Opposition Score	Opposition Score	Opposition Score	Opposition Score	Opposition Score	Rank	Opposition Score	Opposition Score	Opposition Score	Rank
Niklas Edin; Sebastian Kraupp; Viktor Kjäll; Fredrik Lindberg; Oskar Eriksson	Men's tournament	SUI; W 7–5	GBR; W 8–4	CAN; W 7–6	DEN; L 5–8	NOR; W 5–4	CHN; W 6–5	GER; W 8–4	RUS; W 8–4	USA; W 6–4	1 Q	BYE	GBR; L 5–6	CHN; W 6–4	3rd place, bronze medalist(s)
Margaretha Sigfridsson; Maria Prytz; Christina Bertrup; Maria Wennerström; Agnes Knochenhauer	Women's tournament	GBR; W 6–4	CAN; L 3–9	KOR; W 7–4	SUI; W 9–8	DEN; W 7–6	CHN; L 6–7	USA; W 7–6	RUS; W 5–4	JPN; W 8–4	2 Q	BYE	SUI; W 7–5	CAN; L 3–6	2nd place, silver medalist(s)

=== Men's tournament ===
Team: Niklas Edin, Sebastian Kraupp, Viktor Kjäll, Fredrik Lindberg and Oskar Eriksson (reserve)

Round Robin

Final round robin standings
Team	Skip	Pld	W	L	PF	PA	EW	EL	BE	SE	S%	Qualification
Sweden	Niklas Edin	9	8	1	60	44	38	30	18	8	86%	Playoffs
Canada	Brad Jacobs	9	7	2	69	53	39	36	14	7	84%	Playoffs
China	Liu Rui	9	7	2	67	50	41	37	11	5	85%	Playoffs
Norway	Thomas Ulsrud	9	5	4	52	53	36	33	18	5	86%	Tiebreaker
Great Britain	David Murdoch	9	5	4	51	49	37	35	15	8	83%	Tiebreaker
Denmark	Rasmus Stjerne	9	4	5	54	61	32	37	17	4	81%	
Russia	Andrey Drozdov	9	3	6	58	70	36	38	13	7	77%	
Switzerland	Sven Michel	9	3	6	47	46	31	34	22	7	83%	
United States	John Shuster	9	2	7	47	58	30	39	14	7	80%	
Germany	John Jahr	9	1	8	53	74	38	39	10	9	76%	

Round-robin

Draw 1

Sheet B	1	2	3	4	5	6	7	8	9	10	Final
Switzerland (Michel)	0	2	0	0	0	1	0	0	2	0	5
Sweden (Edin)	0	0	0	0	2	0	3	1	0	1	7

Draw 2

Sheet D	1	2	3	4	5	6	7	8	9	10	Final
Sweden (Edin)	0	2	0	0	2	0	0	4	0	X	8
Great Britain (Murdoch)	1	0	0	1	0	0	1	0	1	X	4

Draw 3

Sheet A	1	2	3	4	5	6	7	8	9	10	Final
Canada (Jacobs)	0	0	0	2	0	2	0	0	2	0	6
Sweden (Edin)	0	2	0	0	2	0	2	0	0	1	7

Draw 4

Sheet D	1	2	3	4	5	6	7	8	9	10	Final
Denmark (Stjerne)	1	1	0	0	4	0	0	0	2	X	8
Sweden (Edin)	0	0	1	1	0	0	2	1	0	X	5

Draw 5

Sheet C	1	2	3	4	5	6	7	8	9	10	Final
Norway (Ulsrud)	0	0	1	0	0	0	2	0	0	1	4
Sweden (Edin)	0	1	0	2	1	0	0	1	0	0	5

Draw 6

Sheet B	1	2	3	4	5	6	7	8	9	10	11	Final
Sweden (Edin)	0	0	1	0	1	0	1	2	0	0	1	6
China (Liu)	0	2	0	1	0	1	0	0	0	1	0	5

Draw 7

Sheet A	1	2	3	4	5	6	7	8	9	10	Final
Sweden (Edin)	0	1	0	2	2	0	1	0	2	X	8
Germany (Jahr)	0	0	1	0	0	2	0	1	0	X	4

Draw 8

Sheet C	1	2	3	4	5	6	7	8	9	10	Final
Sweden (Edin)	0	2	0	1	0	2	0	2	1	X	8
Russia (Drozdov)	0	0	2	0	1	0	1	0	0	X	4

Draw 9

Sheet D	1	2	3	4	5	6	7	8	9	10	Final
United States (Shuster)	0	0	0	2	0	0	1	0	1	X	4
Sweden (Edin)	0	3	0	0	1	1	0	1	0	X	6

Semifinal

Sheet B	1	2	3	4	5	6	7	8	9	10	Final
Sweden (Edin)	0	0	2	0	0	0	1	0	2	0	5
Great Britain (Murdoch)	0	1	0	0	1	1	0	1	0	2	6

Bronze medal game

Sheet C	1	2	3	4	5	6	7	8	9	10	11	Final
China (Liu)	0	0	1	0	0	2	0	0	1	0	0	4
Sweden (Edin)	0	1	0	1	0	0	1	0	0	1	2	6

=== Women's tournament ===
Team: Margaretha Sigfridsson, Maria Prytz, Christina Bertrup, Maria Wennerström and Agnes Knochenhauer (reserve)

Round Robin

Final round robin standings
Team	Skip	Pld	W	L	PF	PA	EW	EL	BE	SE	S%	Qualification
Canada	Jennifer Jones	9	9	0	72	40	43	27	12	14	86%	Playoffs
Sweden	Margaretha Sigfridsson	9	7	2	58	52	37	35	13	7	80%	Playoffs
Switzerland	Mirjam Ott	9	5	4	63	60	37	38	13	7	78%	Playoffs
Great Britain	Eve Muirhead	9	5	4	74	58	39	35	9	11	80%	Playoffs
Japan	Ayumi Ogasawara	9	4	5	59	67	39	41	4	10	76%	
Denmark	Lene Nielsen	9	4	5	57	56	34	40	12	9	78%	
China	Wang Bingyu	9	4	5	58	62	36	38	10	4	81%	
South Korea	Kim Ji-sun	9	3	6	60	65	35	37	10	6	79%	
Russia	Anna Sidorova	9	3	6	48	56	33	35	19	6	82%	
United States	Erika Brown	9	1	8	42	75	33	40	8	5	76%	

Round-robin

Draw 1

Sheet C	1	2	3	4	5	6	7	8	9	10	Final
Sweden (Sigfridsson)	0	1	2	0	0	0	2	0	1	X	6
Great Britain (Muirhead)	0	0	0	1	1	1	0	1	0	X	4

Draw 2

Sheet B	1	2	3	4	5	6	7	8	9	10	Final
Sweden (Sigfridsson)	0	0	1	0	1	0	1	0	X	X	3
Canada (Jones)	0	2	0	2	0	2	0	3	X	X	9

Draw 3

Sheet C	1	2	3	4	5	6	7	8	9	10	Final
South Korea (Kim)	0	1	0	1	0	1	0	0	1	X	4
Sweden (Sigfridsson)	0	0	1	0	3	0	1	2	0	X	7

Draw 4

Sheet D	1	2	3	4	5	6	7	8	9	10	Final
Switzerland (Ott)	0	1	0	2	0	0	3	0	2	0	8
Sweden (Sigfridsson)	1	0	3	0	3	0	0	1	0	1	9

Draw 5

Sheet A	1	2	3	4	5	6	7	8	9	10	Final
Sweden (Sigfridsson)	0	0	2	0	1	0	2	0	1	1	7
Denmark (Nielsen)	0	2	0	2	0	1	0	1	0	0	6

Draw 6

Sheet B	1	2	3	4	5	6	7	8	9	10	Final
China (Wang)	0	2	1	0	0	2	0	1	0	1	7
Sweden (Sigfridsson)	0	0	0	1	1	0	2	0	2	0	6

Draw 7

Sheet A	1	2	3	4	5	6	7	8	9	10	Final
United States (Brown)	1	0	1	0	2	0	0	2	0	0	6
Sweden (Sigfridsson)	0	1	0	2	0	2	0	0	0	2	7

Draw 8

Sheet C	1	2	3	4	5	6	7	8	9	10	Final
Sweden (Sigfridsson)	0	0	0	2	0	0	0	1	0	2	5
Russia (Sidorova)	0	0	2	0	0	1	0	0	1	0	4

Draw 9

Sheet D	1	2	3	4	5	6	7	8	9	10	Final
Sweden (Sigfridsson)	0	2	0	2	1	0	0	2	1	X	8
Japan (Ogasawara)	0	0	2	0	0	1	1	0	0	X	4

Semifinal

Team	1	2	3	4	5	6	7	8	9	10	Final
Sweden (Sigfridsson)	1	0	2	0	0	0	1	0	2	1	7
Switzerland (Ott)	0	2	0	0	1	0	0	2	0	0	5

Gold medal game

Team	1	2	3	4	5	6	7	8	9	10	Final
Canada (Jones)	1	0	0	2	0	0	0	1	2	X	6
Sweden (Sigfridsson)	0	1	0	0	2	0	0	0	0	X	3

== Figure skating ==
Athlete	Event	SP		FS		Total	
Athlete	Event	Points	Rank	Points	Rank	Points	Rank
Alexander Majorov	Men's singles	83.81	10 Q	141.05	16	224.86	14
Viktoria Helgesson	Ladies' singles	47.84	27	Did not advance			

== Freestyle skiing ==
Moguls

Athlete	Event	Qualification								Final											
Athlete	Event	Run 1				Run 2				Run 1				Run 2				Run 3			
Athlete	Event	Time	Points	Total	Rank	Time	Points	Total	Rank	Time	Points	Total	Rank	Time	Points	Total	Rank	Time	Points	Total	Rank
Ludvig Fjällström	Men's moguls	26.33	14.80	20.38	16 Q	25.44	14.50	20.50	7 Q	25.30	13.76	19.83	19	Did not advance							
Per Spett	Men's moguls	25.05	14.05	20.24	17 Q	25.81	14.28	20.11	10 Q	25.17	15.68	21.81	12 Q	27.39	8.38	13.47	11	Did not advance			

Ski cross

Athlete	Event	Seeding		Round of 16	Quarterfinal	Semifinal	Final	
Athlete	Event	Time	Rank	Position	Position	Position	Position	Rank
John Eklund	Men's ski cross	1:18.97	27	1 Q	3	Did not advance		11
Michael Forslund	Men's ski cross	1:18.33	22	3	Did not advance			22
Victor Öhling Norberg	Men's ski cross	1:15.59	1	1 Q	3	Did not advance		9
Anna Holmlund	Women's ski cross	1:22.21	4	1 Q	2 Q	1 FA	3	3rd place, bronze medalist(s)
Sandra Näslund	Women's ski cross	1:23.28	10	1 Q	2 Q	DNF FB	1	5

Qualification legend: FA – Qualify to medal round; FB – Qualify to consolation round

Slopestyle

Athlete	Event	Qualification				Final			
Athlete	Event	Run 1	Run 2	Best	Rank	Run 1	Run 2	Best	Rank
Henrik Harlaut	Men's slopestyle	29.20	83.20	83.20	11 Q	83.80	84.40	84.40	6
Jesper Tjäder	Men's slopestyle	61.00	14.20	61.00	24	Did not advance			
Oscar Wester	Men's slopestyle	72.80	28.80	72.80	18	Did not advance			
Emma Dahlström	Women's slopestyle	9.20	79.20	79.20	6 Q	72.80	75.40	75.40	5

== Ice hockey ==
Summary

Key:

- OT – Overtime
- GWS – Match decided by penalty-shootout

Team	Event	Group stage				Qualification playoff	Quarterfinal	Semifinal / Pl.	Final / BM / Pl.	
Team	Event	Opposition Score	Opposition Score	Opposition Score	Rank	Opposition Score	Opposition Score	Opposition Score	Opposition Score	Rank
Sweden men's	Men's tournament	Czech Republic; W 4–2	Switzerland; W 1–0	Latvia; W 5–3	1 QQ	BYE	Slovenia; W 5–0	Finland; W 2–1	Canada; L 0–4	2nd place, silver medalist(s)
Sweden women's	Women's tournament	Japan; W 1–0	Germany; W 4–0	Russia; L 1–3	2 Q	—N/a	Finland; W 4–2	United States; L 1–6	Switzerland; L 3–4	4

=== Men's tournament ===
Roster

The following is the Swedish roster in the men's ice hockey tournament of the 2014 Winter Olympics.

No.	Pos.	Name	Height	Weight	Birthdate	Birthplace	2013–14 team
1	G	Jhonas Enroth	180 cm (5 ft 11 in)	75 kg (165 lb)	25 June 1988	Stockholm	(United States) Buffalo Sabres (NHL)
3	D	Oliver Ekman-Larsson	188 cm (6 ft 2 in)	86 kg (190 lb)	17 July 1991	Karlskrona	(United States) Phoenix Coyotes (NHL)
4	D	Niklas Hjalmarsson	191 cm (6 ft 3 in)	94 kg (207 lb)	6 June 1987	Eksjö	(United States) Chicago Blackhawks (NHL)
7	D	Henrik Tallinder	193 cm (6 ft 4 in)	98 kg (216 lb)	10 January 1979	Stockholm	(United States) Buffalo Sabres (NHL)
11	F	Daniel Alfredsson – A	182 cm (6 ft 0 in)	92 kg (203 lb)	11 December 1972	Gothenburg	(United States) Detroit Red Wings (NHL)
14	F	Patrik Berglund	192 cm (6 ft 4 in)	99 kg (218 lb)	2 June 1988	Västerås	(United States) St. Louis Blues (NHL)
16	F	Marcus Krüger	182 cm (6 ft 0 in)	82 kg (181 lb)	27 May 1990	Stockholm	(United States) Chicago Blackhawks (NHL)
18	F	Jakob Silfverberg	186 cm (6 ft 1 in)	91 kg (201 lb)	13 October 1990	Gävle	(United States) Anaheim Ducks (NHL)
19	F	Nicklas Bäckström	185 cm (6 ft 1 in)	95 kg (209 lb)	23 November 1987	Valbo	(United States) Washington Capitals (NHL)
20	F	Alexander Steen	182 cm (6 ft 0 in)	95 kg (209 lb)	1 March 1984	Winnipeg	(United States) St. Louis Blues (NHL)
21	F	Loui Eriksson	188 cm (6 ft 2 in)	89 kg (196 lb)	17 July 1985	Gothenburg	(United States) Boston Bruins (NHL)
22	F	Daniel Sedin	185 cm (6 ft 1 in)	85 kg (187 lb)	26 September 1980	Örnsköldsvik	(Canada) Vancouver Canucks (NHL)
23	D	Alexander Edler	191 cm (6 ft 3 in)	98 kg (216 lb)	21 April 1986	Östersund	(Canada) Vancouver Canucks (NHL)
27	D	Johnny Oduya	183 cm (6 ft 0 in)	86 kg (190 lb)	1 October 1981	Stockholm	(United States) Chicago Blackhawks (NHL)
30	G	Henrik Lundqvist	185 cm (6 ft 1 in)	87 kg (192 lb)	2 March 1982	Åre	(United States) New York Rangers (NHL)
40	F	Henrik Zetterberg	183 cm (6 ft 0 in)	86 kg (190 lb)	9 October 1980	Njurunda	(United States) Detroit Red Wings (NHL)
41	F	Gustav Nyquist	180 cm (5 ft 11 in)	89 kg (196 lb)	1 September 1989	Halmstad	(United States) Detroit Red Wings (NHL)
42	F	Jimmie Ericsson	187 cm (6 ft 2 in)	84 kg (185 lb)	22 February 1980	Skellefteå	(Sweden) Skellefteå AIK (SHL)
50	G	Jonas Gustavsson	191 cm (6 ft 3 in)	87 kg (192 lb)	24 October 1984	Danderyd	(United States) Detroit Red Wings (NHL)
52	D	Jonathan Ericsson	195 cm (6 ft 5 in)	102 kg (225 lb)	2 March 1984	Karlskrona	(United States) Detroit Red Wings (NHL)
55	D	Niklas Kronwall – C	183 cm (6 ft 0 in)	87 kg (192 lb)	12 January 1981	Stockholm	(United States) Detroit Red Wings (NHL)
62	F	Carl Hagelin	182 cm (6 ft 0 in)	85 kg (187 lb)	23 August 1988	Södertälje	(United States) New York Rangers (NHL)
65	D	Erik Karlsson	181 cm (5 ft 11 in)	79 kg (174 lb)	31 May 1990	Landsbro	(Canada) Ottawa Senators (NHL)
90	F	Marcus Johansson	183 cm (6 ft 0 in)	93 kg (205 lb)	6 October 1990	Landskrona	(United States) Washington Capitals (NHL)
92	F	Gabriel Landeskog – A	185 cm (6 ft 1 in)	99 kg (218 lb)	23 November 1992	Stockholm	(United States) Colorado Avalanche (NHL)

Forwards Johan Franzén and Henrik Sedin were also selected but were unable to participate due to injury. They were replaced by Gustav Nyquist and Marcus Johansson respectively. Henrik Zetterberg was originally named team captain but was replaced by Niklas Kronwall when Zetterberg left the Games due to injury.

Group stage

Team	Pld	W	OTW	OTL	L	GF	GA	GD	Pts	Qualification
Sweden	3	3	0	0	0	10	5	+5	9	Quarterfinals
Switzerland	3	2	0	0	1	2	1	+1	6	
Czech Republic	3	1	0	0	2	6	7	−1	3	
Latvia	3	0	0	0	3	5	10	−5	0	

Source: ESPN

12 February 2014; 21:00	Czech Republic	2–4 (0–2, 2–2, 0–0)	Sweden	Bolshoy Ice Dome, Sochi; Attendance: 11,419

Game reference

Jakub Kovář (out 20:51)
Alexander Salák (in 20:51)
Goalies
Henrik Lundqvist
Referees:
(Russia) Konstantin Olenin
(Canada) Kelly Sutherland
Linesmen:
(Belarus) Ivan Dedioulia
(Canada) Greg Devorski

	0–1	10:07 – E. Karlsson (O. Ekman-Larsson, A. Steen)
	0–2	13:17 – P. Berglund (O. Ekman-Larsson, H. Lundqvist)
	0–3	20:51 – H. Zetterberg (G. Landeskog, N. Kronwall)
	0–4	24:07 – E. Karlsson (D. Sedin, N. Bäckström) (PP)
M. Židlický (P. Eliáš) – 28:12	1–4
J. Jágr (T. Plekanec, T. Kaberle) – 30:01	2–4

10 min
Penalties
10 min
29
Shots
25

14 February 2014; 16:30	Sweden	1–0 (0–0, 0–0, 1–0)	Switzerland	Bolshoy Ice Dome, Sochi; Attendance: 7,968

Game reference
Henrik Lundqvist	Goalies	Reto Berra	Referees: (Canada) Mike Leggo (Czech Republic) Vladimír Šindler; Linesmen: (Canada) Greg Devorski (Finland) Sakari Suominen
D. Alfredsson (E. Karlsson, P. Berglund) – 52:39 / 1–0			Referees: (Canada) Mike Leggo (Czech Republic) Vladimír Šindler; Linesmen: (Canada) Greg Devorski (Finland) Sakari Suominen
4 min	Penalties	8 min	Referees: (Canada) Mike Leggo (Czech Republic) Vladimír Šindler; Linesmen: (Canada) Greg Devorski (Finland) Sakari Suominen
31	Shots	26	Referees: (Canada) Mike Leggo (Czech Republic) Vladimír Šindler; Linesmen: (Canada) Greg Devorski (Finland) Sakari Suominen

15 February 2014; 21:00	Sweden	5–3 (1–1, 3–1, 1–1)	Latvia	Shayba Arena, Sochi; Attendance: 3,709

Game reference

Henrik Lundqvist
Goalies
Kristers Gudļevskis
Referees:
(Czech Republic) Antonín Jeřábek
(United States) Ian Walsh
Linesmen:
(United States) Tommy George
(United States) Andy McElman

P. Berglund (E. Karlsson, A. Steen) (PP) – 15:50	1–0
	1–1	18:48 – L. Dārziņš (J. Sprukts, K. Sotnieks)
	1–2	21:22 – J. Sprukts (K. Rēdlihs, M. Karsums) (PP)
E. Karlsson (N. Bäckström, D. Alfredsson) (PP) – 22:45	2–2
D. Alfredsson (D. Sedin, A. Edler) (PP) – 36:14	3–2
Ji. Ericsson (O. Ekman-Larsson, J. Silfverberg) (PP) – 38:47	4–2
	4–3	41:28 – Z. Girgensons (K. Daugaviņš, R. Freibergs) (PP)
A. Edler (D. Sedin, M. Johansson) – 52:20	5–3

12 min
Penalties
12 min
30
Shots
23

Quarterfinal

19 February 2014; 12:00	Sweden	5–0 (1–0, 0–0, 4–0)	Slovenia	Bolshoy Ice Dome, Sochi; Attendance: 7,325

Game reference

Henrik Lundqvist
Goalies
Robert Kristan
Referees:
(United States) Brad Meier
(Czech Republic) Vladimír Šindler
Linesmen:
(Canada) Chris Carlson
(Canada) Mark Wheler

A. Steen (D. Alfredsson, E. Karlsson) (PP) – 18:50	1–0
D. Sedin (L. Eriksson) – 41:42	2–0
L. Eriksson (N. Bäckström, J. Oduya) – 48:04	3–0
C. Hagelin (N. Kronwall, Ji. Ericsson) – 51:27	4–0
C. Hagelin (E. Karlsson) – 56:10	5–0

8 min
Penalties
8 min
38
Shots
19

Semifinal

21 February 2014; 16:00	Sweden	2–1 (0–0, 2–1, 0–0)	Finland	Bolshoy Ice Dome, Sochi; Attendance: 9,476

Game reference

Henrik Lundqvist
Goalies
Kari Lehtonen
Referees:
(Russia) Konstantin Olenin
(United States) Tim Peel
Linesmen:
(Canada) Derek Amell
(Canada) Chris Carlson

	0–1	26:17 – O. Jokinen (S. Vatanen)
L. Eriksson (Jo. Ericsson, N. Bäckström) – 31:39	1–1
E. Karlsson (A. Steen, D. Sedin) (PP) – 36:26	2–1

10 min
Penalties
4 min
25
Shots
26

Gold medal game

23 February 2014; 16:00	(silver) Sweden	0–3 (0–1, 0–1, 0–1)	Canada (gold)	Bolshoy Ice Dome, Sochi; Attendance: 11,076

Game reference

Henrik Lundqvist
Goalies
Carey Price
Referees:
(United States) Brad Meier
(Canada) Kelly Sutherland
Linesmen:
(Canada) Derek Amell
(Canada) Greg Devorski

0–1	12:55 – J. Toews (J.Carter, S. Weber)
0–2	35:43 – S. Crosby
0–3	49:04 – C. Kunitz

6 min
Penalties
4 min
24
Shots
36

=== Women's tournament ===
Roster

The following is the Swedish roster in the women's ice hockey tournament of the 2014 Winter Olympics.

No.	Pos.	Name	Height	Weight	Birthdate	Birthplace	2013–14 team
1	G	Sara Grahn	170 cm (5 ft 7 in)	69 kg (152 lb)	25 September 1988	Örebro	(Sweden) Brynäs IF (RIKS)
3	D	Sofia Engström	163 cm (5 ft 4 in)	63 kg (139 lb)	3 July 1988	Surahammar	(Sweden) Leksands IF (RIKS)
4	F	Jenni Asserholt – C	172 cm (5 ft 8 in)	71 kg (157 lb)	8 April 1988	Örebro	(Sweden) Linköpings HC (RIKS)
6	D	Lina Bäcklin	169 cm (5 ft 7 in)	67 kg (148 lb)	3 October 1994	Gävle	(Sweden) Brynäs IF (RIKS)
7	D	Johanna Olofsson	169 cm (5 ft 7 in)	66 kg (146 lb)	13 July 1991	Storuman	(Sweden) Modo Hockey (RIKS)
9	D	Josefine Holmgren	175 cm (5 ft 9 in)	72 kg (159 lb)	11 April 1993	Skutskär	(Sweden) Brynäs IF (RIKS)
10	D	Emilia Andersson	163 cm (5 ft 4 in)	63 kg (139 lb)	31 August 1988	Stockholm	(Sweden) Linköpings HC (RIKS)
11	F	Cecilia Östberg	166 cm (5 ft 5 in)	67 kg (148 lb)	15 January 1991	Leksand	(Sweden) Leksands IF (RIKS)
13	F	Lina Wester	170 cm (5 ft 7 in)	65 kg (143 lb)	7 November 1992	Rättvik	(Sweden) Leksands IF (RIKS)
16	F	Pernilla Winberg	165 cm (5 ft 5 in)	63 kg (139 lb)	24 February 1989	Limhamn	(Sweden) Munksund-Skuthamns SK (RIKS)
17	D	Linnea Bäckman	167 cm (5 ft 6 in)	66 kg (146 lb)	18 April 1991	Stockholm	(Sweden) AIK IF (RIKS)
18	F	Anna Borgqvist	163 cm (5 ft 4 in)	63 kg (139 lb)	11 June 1992	Växjö	(Sweden) Brynäs IF (RIKS)
19	F	Maria Lindh	176 cm (5 ft 9 in)	63 kg (139 lb)	29 September 1993	Stockholm	(Sweden) Modo Hockey (RIKS)
20	F	Fanny Rask	168 cm (5 ft 6 in)	64 kg (141 lb)	21 May 1991	Leksand	(Sweden) AIK IF (RIKS)
21	F	Erica Udén Johansson	171 cm (5 ft 7 in)	72 kg (159 lb)	20 July 1989	Sundsvall	(Sweden) IF Sundsvall Hockey (RIKS)
22	D	Emma Eliasson	167 cm (5 ft 6 in)	68 kg (150 lb)	12 June 1989	Kiruna	(Sweden) Munksund-Skuthamns SK (RIKS)
24	F	Erika Grahm	174 cm (5 ft 9 in)	70 kg (150 lb)	26 January 1991	Kramfors	(Sweden) Modo Hockey (RIKS)
27	F	Emma Nordin	168 cm (5 ft 6 in)	70 kg (150 lb)	22 March 1991	Örnsköldsvik	(Sweden) Modo Hockey (RIKS)
28	F	Michelle Löwenhielm	172 cm (5 ft 8 in)	67 kg (148 lb)	22 March 1995	Stockholm	(Sweden) AIK IF (RIKS)
30	G	Kim Martin Hasson	166 cm (5 ft 5 in)	68 kg (150 lb)	28 February 1986	Stockholm	(Sweden) Linköpings HC (RIKS)
35	G	Valentina Lizana Wallner	170 cm (5 ft 7 in)	65 kg (143 lb)	30 March 1990	Stockholm	(Sweden) Modo Hockey (RIKS)

Group stage

Team	Pld	W	OTW	OTL	L	GF	GA	GD	Pts	Qualification
Russia	3	3	0	0	0	9	3	+6	9	Quarterfinals
Sweden	3	2	0	0	1	6	3	+3	6	Quarterfinals
Germany	3	1	0	0	2	5	8	−3	3	5–8th place semifinals
Japan	3	0	0	0	3	1	7	−6	0	5–8th place semifinals

Source: IIHF

9 February 2014; 12:00	Sweden	1–0 (1–0, 0–0, 0–0)	Japan	Shayba Arena, Sochi; Attendance: 2,928

Game reference
Valentina Wallner	Goalies	Nana Fujimoto	Referee: (United States) Erin Blair; Linesmen: (France) Charlotte Girard (Czech Republic) Zuzana Svobodová
J. Asserholt (E. Eliasson, E. Grahm) (PP) – 12:38 / 1–0			Referee: (United States) Erin Blair; Linesmen: (France) Charlotte Girard (Czech Republic) Zuzana Svobodová
8 min	Penalties	4 min	Referee: (United States) Erin Blair; Linesmen: (France) Charlotte Girard (Czech Republic) Zuzana Svobodová
23	Shots	19	Referee: (United States) Erin Blair; Linesmen: (France) Charlotte Girard (Czech Republic) Zuzana Svobodová

11 February 2014; 14:00	Germany	0–4 (0–1, 0–0, 0–3)	Sweden	Shayba Arena, Sochi; Attendance: 4,015

Game reference

Jennifer Harß
Goalies
Kim Martin Hasson
Referee:
(Norway) Aina Hove
Linesmen:
(Canada) Stephanie Gagnon
(Slovakia) Michaela Kúdelová

0–1	01:00 – E. Nordin (E. Eliasson, E. Grahm)
0–2	47:42 – C. Östberg (A. Borgqvist)
0–3	50:31 – J. Olofsson (C. Östberg, M. Löwenhielm)
0–4	51:35 – P. Winberg (A. Borgqvist)

4 min
Penalties
10 min
21
Shots
29

13 February 2014; 21:00	Sweden	1–3 (0–1, 1–1, 0–1)	Russia	Shayba Arena, Sochi; Attendance: 5,092

Game reference

Valentina Wallner
Goalies
Anna Prugova
Referee:
(United Kingdom) Joy Tottman
Linesmen:
(Canada) Stephanie Gagnon
(United States) Alicia Hanrahan

	0–1	08:38 – A. Shukina (Y. Pashkevich, A. Shokhina)
	0–2	29:20 – A. Khomich (Y. Smolina)
P. Winberg – 38:58	1–2
	1–3	58:07 – Y. Smolentseva (O. Sosina)

14 min
Penalties
4 min
16
Shots
31

Quarterfinal

15 February 2014; 12:00	Finland	2–4 (0–0, 1–0, 1–4)	Sweden	Shayba Arena, Sochi; Attendance: 2,917

Game reference

Noora Räty
Goalies
Valentina Wallner
Referee:
(Germany) Nicole Hertrich
Linesmen:
(Canada) Stephanie Gagnon
(United States) Laura Johnson

V. Hovi (L. Välimäki) – 33:16	1–0
	1–1	40:48 – A. Borgqvist (PP)
	1–2	45:09 – L. Wester (J. Asserholt, P. Winberg)
E. Nuutinen (K. Rantamäki, R. Lindstedt) – 45:21	2–2
	2–3	55:45 – E. Eliasson (M. Löwenhielm, E. Grahm) (PP)
	2–4	59:19 – E. Nordin (P. Winberg) (EN)

12 min
Penalties
10 min
31
Shots
32

Semifinal

17 February 2014; 16:30	United States	6–1 (3–0, 2–0, 1–1)	Sweden	Shayba Arena, Sochi; Attendance: 4,542

Game reference

Jessie Vetter
Goalies
Valentina Lizana Wallner
Kim Martin Hasson
Referee:
(Canada) Melanie Bordeleau
Linesmen:
(Canada) Denise Caughey
(Czech Republic) Zuzana Svobodová

A. Carpenter (M. Bozek, K. Stack) (PP) – 06:10	1–0
K. Bellamy (B. Decker, M. Bozek) – 07:16	2–0
A. Kessel (B. Decker, G. Marvin) – 11:19	3–0
M. Lamoureux (J. Lamoureux, K. Bellamy) (PP) – 25:41	4-0
M. Bozek (K. Coyne) – 32:17	5–0
	5–1	53:04 – A. Borgqvist (E. Eliasson, P. Winberg)
B. Decker (K. Coyne, A. Kessel) – 56:58	6–1

6 min
Penalties
8 min
70
Shots
9

Bronze medal game

20 February 2014; 16:00	(bronze) Switzerland	4–3 (0–1, 0–1, 4–1)	Sweden	Bolshoy Ice Dome, Sochi; Attendance: 8,263

Game reference

Florence Schelling
Goalies
Valentina Lizana Wallner
Referee:
(Germany) Nicole Hertrich
Linesmen:
(Canada) Denise Caughey
(United States) Alicia Hanrahan

	0–1	14:00 – M. Löwenhielm (M. Lindh, C. Östberg)
	0–2	38:58 – E. Johansson (C. Östberg)
S. Benz (S. Forster) – 41:18	1–2
P. Stanz (A. Müller) (PP) – 46:13	2–2
J. Lutz (L. Stalder, L. Benz) – 53:43	3–2
A. Müller (ENG) – 58:53	4–2
	4–3	59:16 – P. Winberg (J. Asserholt, E. Grahm) (EA)

10 min
Penalties
4 min
26
Shots
31

== Snowboarding ==
Freestyle

Athlete	Event	Qualification				Semifinal				Final			
Athlete	Event	Run 1	Run 2	Best	Rank	Run 1	Run 2	Best	Rank	Run 1	Run 2	Best	Rank
Niklas Mattsson	Men's slopestyle	82.75	57.25	82.75	7 QS	44.75	36.50	44.75	15	Did not advance			
Sven Thorgren	Men's slopestyle	94.25	36.75	94.25	3 QF	BYE				83.75	87.50	87.50	4

Qualification Legend: QF – Qualify directly to final; QS – Qualify to semifinal

== Speed skating ==
Men

Athlete	Event	Final	
Athlete	Event	Time	Rank
David Andersson	1000 m	1:12.40	38
David Andersson	1500 m	1:50.29	38

== See also ==
- Sweden at the 2014 Summer Youth Olympics
- Sweden at the 2014 Winter Paralympics
