= Curling at the 2014 Winter Olympics =

Curling at the XXII Olympic Winter Games
- Venue: Ice Cube Curling Center, Sochi, Russia
- Dates: 10–21 February 2014
- Competitors: 100 from 12 nations

Men's curling at the XXII Olympic Winter Games

Medalists
1st place, gold medalist(s)		Canada
2nd place, silver medalist(s)		Great Britain
3rd place, bronze medalist(s)		Sweden

Women's curling at the XXII Olympic Winter Games

Medalists
1st place, gold medalist(s)		Canada
2nd place, silver medalist(s)		Sweden
3rd place, bronze medalist(s)		Great Britain

The curling competition of the 2014 Winter Olympics was held at the Ice Cube Curling Center, nicknamed "the Ice Cube". It is the sixth time that curling was on the Olympic program. In both the men's and women's competitions, ten nations competed. These two events took place from 10 to 21 February 2014.

The Canadian women's team went through the whole competition undefeated, the first time this has happened in an Olympic women's curling competition. Additionally, both the Canadian men's and women's teams won the gold medal, becoming the first country to do so in the history of the event.

== Medal summary ==
=== Medal table ===
Rank	Nation	Gold	Silver	Bronze	Total
1	Canada	2	0	0	2
2	Great Britain	0	1	1	2
2	Sweden	0	1	1	2
Totals (3 entries)		2	2	2	6

=== Medal events ===
Event	Gold	Silver	Bronze
Men	Canada; Brad Jacobs; Ryan Fry; E. J. Harnden; Ryan Harnden; Caleb Flaxey	Great Britain; David Murdoch; Greg Drummond; Scott Andrews; Michael Goodfellow; Tom Brewster	Sweden; Niklas Edin; Sebastian Kraupp; Fredrik Lindberg; Viktor Kjäll; Oskar Eriksson
Women	Canada; Jennifer Jones; Kaitlyn Lawes; Jill Officer; Dawn McEwen; Kirsten Wall	Sweden; Margaretha Sigfridsson; Maria Prytz; Christina Bertrup; Maria Wennerström; Agnes Knochenhauer	Great Britain; Eve Muirhead; Anna Sloan; Vicki Adams; Claire Hamilton; Lauren Gray

== Qualification ==
Qualification to the curling tournaments at the Winter Olympics was determined through two methods. Nations could qualify teams by earning qualification points from performances at the 2012 and 2013 World Curling Championships. Teams could also qualify through an Olympic qualification event which was held in the autumn of 2013. Seven nations qualified teams via World Championship qualification points, while two nations qualified through the qualification event. As host nation, Russia qualified teams automatically, thus making a total of ten teams per gender in the curling tournaments.

== Participating nations ==
Twelve nations participated, with the number of athletes participating per nation in parentheses. South Korea made its Olympic curling debut.

- Canada (10)
- China (10)
- Denmark (10)
- Germany (5)
- Great Britain (10)
- Japan (5)
- Norway (5)
- Russia (10)
- South Korea (5)
- Sweden (10)
- Switzerland (10)
- United States (10)

== Results summary ==
=== Men ===
==== Round robin ====
The men's curling competition began with a round-robin tournament, where every team played every other team. The top four teams from the round robin advanced to the playoffs.

Standings

Final round robin standings
Team	Skip	Pld	W	L	PF	PA	EW	EL	BE	SE	S%	Qualification
Sweden	Niklas Edin	9	8	1	60	44	38	30	18	8	86%	Playoffs
Canada	Brad Jacobs	9	7	2	69	53	39	36	14	7	84%	Playoffs
China	Liu Rui	9	7	2	67	50	41	37	11	5	85%	Playoffs
Norway	Thomas Ulsrud	9	5	4	52	53	36	33	18	5	86%	Tiebreaker
Great Britain	David Murdoch	9	5	4	51	49	37	35	15	8	83%	Tiebreaker
Denmark	Rasmus Stjerne	9	4	5	54	61	32	37	17	4	81%	
Russia	Andrey Drozdov	9	3	6	58	70	36	38	13	7	77%	
Switzerland	Sven Michel	9	3	6	47	46	31	34	22	7	83%	
United States	John Shuster	9	2	7	47	58	30	39	14	7	80%	
Germany	John Jahr	9	1	8	53	74	38	39	10	9	76%	

Results

Team	CAN	CHN	DEN	GER	GBR	NOR	RUS	SWE	SUI	USA
Canada	—	9–8	7–6	11–8	7–5	10–4	7–4	6–7	4–5	8–6
China	8–9	—	7–4	11–7	6–5	7–5	9–6	5–6	5–4	9–4
Denmark	6–7	4–7	—	6–3	6–8	5–3	11–10	8–5	3–9	5–9
Germany	8–11	7–11	3–6	—	6–7	5–8	7–8	4–8	8–7	5–8
Great Britain	5–7	5–6	8–6	7–6	—	6–7	7–4	4–8	4–2	5–3
Norway	4–10	5–7	3–5	8–5	7–6	—	9–8	4–5	5–3	7–4
Russia	4–7	6–9	10–11	8–7	4–7	8–9	—	4–8	7–6	7–6
Sweden	7–6	6–5	5–8	8–4	8–4	5–4	8–4	—	7–5	6–4
Switzerland	5–4	4–5	9–3	8–9	2–4	3–5	6–7	5–7	—	6–3
United States	6–8	4–9	9–5	8–5	3–5	4–7	6–7	4–6	3–6	—

==== Playoffs ====
The top four teams at the conclusion of the round robin advanced to the playoffs. The fourth seed was determined by a tiebreaker game between Norway and Great Britain, which Great Britain won with a score of 6–5.

Semifinals
1	Sweden	5
4	Great Britain	6
2	Canada	10
3	China	6

Gold medal game
4	Great Britain	3
2	Canada	9
Bronze medal game
1	Sweden	6
3	China	4

Bronze medal game

Friday, 21 February, 12:30 pm

Sheet C	1	2	3	4	5	6	7	8	9	10	11	Final
China (Liu)	0	0	1	0	0	2	0	0	1	0	0	4
Sweden (Edin)	0	1	0	1	0	0	1	0	0	1	2	6

Player percentages
Sweden		China	
Viktor Kjäll	94%	Zang Jialiang	86%
Fredrik Lindberg	88%	Ba Dexin	91%
Sebastian Kraupp	76%	Xu Xiaoming	81%
Niklas Edin	94%	Liu Rui	86%
Total	88%	Total	86%

Gold medal game

Friday, 21 February, 5:30 pm

Sheet C	1	2	3	4	5	6	7	8	9	10	Final
Canada (Jacobs)	2	0	3	1	0	2	0	1	X	X	9
Great Britain (Murdoch)	0	1	0	0	1	0	1	0	X	X	3

Player percentages
Great Britain		Canada	
Michael Goodfellow	92%	Ryan Harnden	94%
Scott Andrews	67%	E. J. Harnden	92%
Greg Drummond	88%	Ryan Fry	81%
David Murdoch	69%	Brad Jacobs	95%
Total	79%	Total	91%

=== Women ===
==== Round robin ====
The women's curling competition began with a round-robin tournament, where every team played every other team. The top four teams from the round robin advanced to the playoffs.

Standings

Final round robin standings
Team	Skip	Pld	W	L	PF	PA	EW	EL	BE	SE	S%	Qualification
Canada	Jennifer Jones	9	9	0	72	40	43	27	12	14	86%	Playoffs
Sweden	Margaretha Sigfridsson	9	7	2	58	52	37	35	13	7	80%	Playoffs
Switzerland	Mirjam Ott	9	5	4	63	60	37	38	13	7	78%	Playoffs
Great Britain	Eve Muirhead	9	5	4	74	58	39	35	9	11	80%	Playoffs
Japan	Ayumi Ogasawara	9	4	5	59	67	39	41	4	10	76%	
Denmark	Lene Nielsen	9	4	5	57	56	34	40	12	9	78%	
China	Wang Bingyu	9	4	5	58	62	36	38	10	4	81%	
South Korea	Kim Ji-sun	9	3	6	60	65	35	37	10	6	79%	
Russia	Anna Sidorova	9	3	6	48	56	33	35	19	6	82%	
United States	Erika Brown	9	1	8	42	75	33	40	8	5	76%	

Results

Team	CAN	CHN	DEN	GBR	JPN	RUS	KOR	SWE	SUI	USA
Canada	—	9–2	8–5	9–6	8–6	5–3	9–4	9–3	8–5	7–6
China	2–9	—	6–9	7–8	5–8	7–5	11–3	7–6	6–10	7–4
Denmark	5–8	9–6	—	8–7	3–8	4–7	7–4	6–7	6–7	9–2
Great Britain	6–9	8–7	7–8	—	12–3	9–6	10–8	4–6	6–8	12–3
Japan	6–8	8–5	8–3	3–12	—	8–4	7–12	4–8	9–7	6–8
Russia	3–5	5–7	7–4	6–9	4–8	—	4–8	4–5	6–3	9–6
South Korea	4–9	3–11	4–7	8–10	12–7	8–4	—	4–7	6–8	11–2
Sweden	3–9	6–7	7–6	6–4	8–4	5–4	7–4	—	9–8	7–6
Switzerland	5–8	10–6	7–6	8–6	7–9	3–6	8–6	8–9	—	7–4
United States	6–7	4–7	2–9	3–12	8–6	6–9	2–11	6–7	4–7	—

==== Playoffs ====
The top four teams at the conclusion of the round robin advanced to the playoffs.

Semifinals
1	Canada	6
4	Great Britain	4
2	Sweden	7
3	Switzerland	5

Gold medal game
1	Canada	6
2	Sweden	3
Bronze medal game
4	Great Britain	6
3	Switzerland	5

Bronze medal game

Thursday, 20 February, 12:30

Team	1	2	3	4	5	6	7	8	9	10	Final
Great Britain (Muirhead)	0	0	1	0	2	0	0	2	0	1	6
Switzerland (Ott)	0	2	0	1	0	1	0	0	1	0	5

Player percentages
Great Britain		Switzerland	
Claire Hamilton	91%	Janine Greiner	78%
Vicki Adams	74%	Carmen Küng	81%
Anna Sloan	74%	Carmen Schäfer	73%
Eve Muirhead	89%	Mirjam Ott	85%
Total	82%	Total	79%

Gold medal game

Thursday, 20 February, 17:30

Team	1	2	3	4	5	6	7	8	9	10	Final
Canada (Jones)	1	0	0	2	0	0	0	1	2	X	6
Sweden (Sigfridsson)	0	1	0	0	2	0	0	0	0	X	3

Player percentages
Canada		Sweden	
Dawn McEwen	99%	Margaretha Sigfridsson	94%
Jill Officer	76%	Maria Wennerström	88%
Kaitlyn Lawes	68%	Christina Bertrup	79%
Jennifer Jones	88%	Maria Prytz	85%
Total	82%	Total	86%
