= 2011 World Curling Championships =

The 2011 World Curling Championships may refer to one of the following curling championships:

- 2011 Ford World Men's Curling Championship
- 2011 Capital One World Women's Curling Championship
- 2011 World Junior Curling Championships
- 2011 World Senior Curling Championships
- 2011 World Wheelchair Curling Championship
- 2011 World Mixed Doubles Curling Championship
