= Curling at the 2014 Winter Olympics – Men's tournament =

Men's curling at the XXII Olympic Winter Games
- Venue: Ice Cube Curling Center, Sochi, Russia
- Dates: 10–21 February 2014
- Competitors: 50 from 10 nations

Medalists
1st place, gold medalist(s)		Canada
2nd place, silver medalist(s)		Great Britain
3rd place, bronze medalist(s)		Sweden

The men's curling tournament of the 2014 Winter Olympics was held at the Ice Cube Curling Center in Sochi, Russia on 10–21 February 2014. Ten nations competed in a round robin preliminary round, and the top four nations at the conclusion of the round robin qualified for the medal round.

== Teams ==
The teams are listed as follows:

Canada	China	Denmark	Germany	Great Britain
Soo CA, Sault Ste. Marie: Skip: Brad Jacobs; Third: Ryan Fry; Second: E. J. Harnden; Lead: Ryan Harnden; Alternate: Caleb Flaxey	Harbin CC, Harbin: Skip: Liu Rui; Third: Xu Xiaoming; Second: Ba Dexin; Lead: Zang Jialiang; Alternate: Zou Dejia	Hvidovre CC, Hvidovre: Skip: Rasmus Stjerne; Third: Johnny Frederiksen; Second: Mikkel Poulsen; Lead: Troels Harry; Alternate: Lars Vilandt	CC Hamburg, Hamburg: Fourth: Felix Schulze; Skip: John Jahr; Second: Christopher Bartsch; Lead: Sven Goldemann; Alternate: Peter Rickmers	Curl Aberdeen, Aberdeen: Skip: David Murdoch; Third: Greg Drummond; Second: Scott Andrews; Lead: Michael Goodfellow; Alternate: Tom Brewster
Norway	Russia	Sweden	Switzerland	United States
Snarøen CC, Oslo: Skip: Thomas Ulsrud; Third: Torger Nergård; Second: Christoffer Svae; Lead: Håvard Vad Petersson; Alternate: Markus Høiberg	Moskvitch CC, Moscow: Fourth: Aleksey Stukalskiy; Third: Evgeniy Arkhipov; Skip: Andrey Drozdov; Lead: Petr Dron; Alternate: Aleksandr Kozyrev	Karlstads CK, Karlstad: Skip: Niklas Edin; Third: Sebastian Kraupp; Second: Fredrik Lindberg; Lead: Viktor Kjäll; Alternate: Oskar Eriksson	CC Adelboden, Adelboden: Skip: Sven Michel; Third: Claudio Pätz; Second: Sandro Trolliet; Lead: Simon Gempeler; Alternate: Benoît Schwarz	Duluth CC, Duluth: Skip: John Shuster; Third: Jeff Isaacson; Second: Jared Zezel; Lead: John Landsteiner; Alternate: Craig Brown

== Round-robin standings ==
Final round robin standings
Team	Skip	Pld	W	L	PF	PA	EW	EL	BE	SE	S%	Qualification
Sweden	Niklas Edin	9	8	1	60	44	38	30	18	8	86%	Playoffs
Canada	Brad Jacobs	9	7	2	69	53	39	36	14	7	84%	Playoffs
China	Liu Rui	9	7	2	67	50	41	37	11	5	85%	Playoffs
Norway	Thomas Ulsrud	9	5	4	52	53	36	33	18	5	86%	Tiebreaker
Great Britain	David Murdoch	9	5	4	51	49	37	35	15	8	83%	Tiebreaker
Denmark	Rasmus Stjerne	9	4	5	54	61	32	37	17	4	81%	
Russia	Andrey Drozdov	9	3	6	58	70	36	38	13	7	77%	
Switzerland	Sven Michel	9	3	6	47	46	31	34	22	7	83%	
United States	John Shuster	9	2	7	47	58	30	39	14	7	80%	
Germany	John Jahr	9	1	8	53	74	38	39	10	9	76%	

== Round-robin results ==
All draw times are listed in Moscow Time (UTC+4).

=== Summary ===
Team	CAN	CHN	DEN	GER	GBR	NOR	RUS	SWE	SUI	USA
Canada	—	9–8	7–6	11–8	7–5	10–4	7–4	6–7	4–5	8–6
China	8–9	—	7–4	11–7	6–5	7–5	9–6	5–6	5–4	9–4
Denmark	6–7	4–7	—	6–3	6–8	5–3	11–10	8–5	3–9	5–9
Germany	8–11	7–11	3–6	—	6–7	5–8	7–8	4–8	8–7	5–8
Great Britain	5–7	5–6	8–6	7–6	—	6–7	7–4	4–8	4–2	5–3
Norway	4–10	5–7	3–5	8–5	7–6	—	9–8	4–5	5–3	7–4
Russia	4–7	6–9	10–11	8–7	4–7	8–9	—	4–8	7–6	7–6
Sweden	7–6	6–5	5–8	8–4	8–4	5–4	8–4	—	7–5	6–4
Switzerland	5–4	4–5	9–3	8–9	2–4	3–5	6–7	5–7	—	6–3
United States	6–8	4–9	9–5	8–5	3–5	4–7	6–7	4–6	3–6	—

=== Draw 1 ===
Monday, 10 February, 09:00

Sheet A	1	2	3	4	5	6	7	8	9	10	Final
Russia (Drozdov)	0	0	0	0	1	0	1	0	2	X	4
Great Britain (Murdoch) 🔨	0	2	0	0	0	4	0	1	0	X	7

Sheet B	1	2	3	4	5	6	7	8	9	10	Final
Switzerland (Michel) 🔨	0	2	0	0	0	1	0	0	2	0	5
Sweden (Edin)	0	0	0	0	2	0	3	1	0	1	7

Sheet C	1	2	3	4	5	6	7	8	9	10	Final
Denmark (Stjerne)	0	0	0	0	1	0	1	0	2	0	4
China (Liu) 🔨	0	2	1	0	0	0	0	3	0	1	7

Sheet D	1	2	3	4	5	6	7	8	9	10	Final
Germany (Jahr)	0	2	2	0	0	1	0	1	2	0	8
Canada (Jacobs) 🔨	2	0	0	3	2	0	2	0	0	2	11

=== Draw 2 ===
Monday, 10 February, 19:00

Sheet A	1	2	3	4	5	6	7	8	9	10	Final
United States (Shuster)	0	1	0	2	0	0	0	1	0	X	4
Norway (Ulsrud) 🔨	2	0	3	0	0	1	1	0	0	X	7

Sheet B	1	2	3	4	5	6	7	8	9	10	11	Final
Denmark (Stjerne)	0	0	2	0	3	0	2	0	3	0	1	11
Russia (Drozdov) 🔨	2	3	0	1	0	1	0	2	0	1	0	10

Sheet C	1	2	3	4	5	6	7	8	9	10	Final
Canada (Jacobs) 🔨	0	0	0	0	0	2	0	1	0	1	4
Switzerland (Michel)	0	0	0	0	3	0	1	0	1	0	5

Sheet D	1	2	3	4	5	6	7	8	9	10	Final
Sweden (Edin)	0	2	0	0	2	0	0	4	0	X	8
Great Britain (Murdoch) 🔨	1	0	0	1	0	0	1	0	1	X	4

=== Draw 3 ===
Tuesday, 11 February, 14:00

Sheet A	1	2	3	4	5	6	7	8	9	10	Final
Canada (Jacobs)	0	0	0	2	0	2	0	0	2	0	6
Sweden (Edin) 🔨	0	2	0	0	2	0	2	0	0	1	7

Sheet B	1	2	3	4	5	6	7	8	9	10	Final
United States (Shuster)	0	1	0	2	0	1	0	0	X	X	4
China (Liu) 🔨	1	0	3	0	2	0	1	2	X	X	9

Sheet C	1	2	3	4	5	6	7	8	9	10	Final
Great Britain (Murdoch) 🔨	1	0	0	0	2	0	2	0	1	1	7
Germany (Jahr)	0	1	1	1	0	2	0	1	0	0	6

Sheet D	1	2	3	4	5	6	7	8	9	10	Final
Norway (Ulsrud) 🔨	2	1	0	2	0	2	0	2	0	0	9
Russia (Drozdov)	0	0	1	0	2	0	2	0	0	3	8

=== Draw 4 ===
Wednesday, 12 February, 09:00

Sheet A	1	2	3	4	5	6	7	8	9	10	Final
Denmark (Stjerne) 🔨	3	0	0	0	0	0	0	0	2	0	5
United States (Shuster)	0	2	1	2	1	0	0	1	0	2	9

Sheet B	1	2	3	4	5	6	7	8	9	10	Final
Norway (Ulsrud) 🔨	2	0	0	0	2	0	1	0	0	3	8
Germany (Jahr)	0	0	1	0	0	2	0	0	2	0	5

Sheet D	1	2	3	4	5	6	7	8	9	10	Final
China (Liu) 🔨	0	2	0	1	0	0	0	1	0	1	5
Switzerland (Michel)	0	0	2	0	1	0	0	0	1	0	4

=== Draw 5 ===
Wednesday, 12 February, 19:00

Sheet A	1	2	3	4	5	6	7	8	9	10	Final
Germany (Jahr)	0	1	0	2	0	2	1	0	1	0	7
China (Liu) 🔨	2	0	3	0	2	0	0	1	0	3	11

Sheet B	1	2	3	4	5	6	7	8	9	10	Final
Switzerland (Michel)	0	0	0	0	1	0	0	1	0	0	2
Great Britain (Murdoch) 🔨	0	0	1	1	0	1	0	0	0	1	4

Sheet C	1	2	3	4	5	6	7	8	9	10	Final
Russia (Drozdov) 🔨	0	1	0	1	0	0	0	2	0	X	4
Canada (Jacobs)	2	0	0	0	4	0	0	0	1	X	7

Sheet D	1	2	3	4	5	6	7	8	9	10	Final
Denmark (Stjerne) 🔨	1	1	0	0	4	0	0	0	2	X	8
Sweden (Edin)	0	0	1	1	0	0	2	1	0	X	5

=== Draw 6 ===
Thursday, 13 February, 14:00

Sheet A	1	2	3	4	5	6	7	8	9	10	Final
Switzerland (Michel)	0	2	1	0	0	0	1	2	0	0	6
Russia (Drozdov) 🔨	0	0	0	0	2	1	0	0	1	3	7

Sheet B	1	2	3	4	5	6	7	8	9	10	Final
Canada (Jacobs)	0	1	0	2	0	2	0	1	0	1	7
Denmark (Stjerne) 🔨	1	0	1	0	1	0	1	0	2	0	6

Sheet C	1	2	3	4	5	6	7	8	9	10	Final
Norway (Ulsrud)	0	0	1	0	0	0	2	0	0	1	4
Sweden (Edin) 🔨	0	1	0	2	1	0	0	1	0	0	5

Sheet D	1	2	3	4	5	6	7	8	9	10	Final
Great Britain (Murdoch)	1	0	2	0	1	0	0	1	0	X	5
United States (Shuster) 🔨	0	0	0	1	0	0	1	0	1	X	3

=== Draw 7 ===
Friday, 14 February, 09:00

Sheet B	1	2	3	4	5	6	7	8	9	10	11	Final
Sweden (Edin)	0	0	1	0	1	0	1	2	0	0	1	6
China (Liu) 🔨	0	2	0	1	0	1	0	0	0	1	0	5

Sheet C	1	2	3	4	5	6	7	8	9	10	Final
United States (Shuster)	0	0	4	0	0	0	4	0	0	X	8
Germany (Jahr) 🔨	0	1	0	1	0	1	0	1	1	X	5

Sheet D	1	2	3	4	5	6	7	8	9	10	Final
Canada (Jacobs) 🔨	0	1	0	2	0	0	4	0	3	X	10
Norway (Ulsrud)	1	0	1	0	0	1	0	1	0	X	4

=== Draw 8 ===
Friday, 14 February, 19:00

Sheet A	1	2	3	4	5	6	7	8	9	10	Final
Great Britain (Murdoch)	0	0	0	1	0	3	0	2	1	1	8
Denmark (Stjerne) 🔨	0	2	1	0	2	0	1	0	0	0	6

Sheet B	1	2	3	4	5	6	7	8	9	10	Final
Russia (Drozdov) 🔨	0	2	1	0	2	0	0	0	1	1	7
United States (Shuster)	0	0	0	3	0	2	1	0	0	0	6

Sheet C	1	2	3	4	5	6	7	8	9	10	Final
China (Liu) 🔨	1	0	0	2	0	2	0	1	0	1	7
Norway (Ulsrud)	0	0	2	0	1	0	1	0	1	0	5

Sheet D	1	2	3	4	5	6	7	8	9	10	Final
Switzerland (Michel)	1	0	2	0	1	0	0	2	0	1	7
Germany (Jahr) 🔨	0	2	0	1	0	2	1	0	2	0	8

=== Draw 9 ===
Saturday, 15 February, 14:00

Sheet A	1	2	3	4	5	6	7	8	9	10	Final
Sweden (Edin) 🔨	0	1	0	2	2	0	1	0	2	X	8
Germany (Jahr)	0	0	1	0	0	2	0	1	0	X	4

Sheet B	1	2	3	4	5	6	7	8	9	10	Final
Denmark (Stjerne)	0	0	0	0	2	0	1	0	X	X	3
Switzerland (Michel) 🔨	4	0	0	0	0	2	0	3	X	X	9

Sheet C	1	2	3	4	5	6	7	8	9	10	Final
Canada (Jacobs) 🔨	1	0	0	3	0	0	1	0	1	1	7
Great Britain (Murdoch)	0	1	1	0	2	0	0	1	0	0	5

Sheet D	1	2	3	4	5	6	7	8	9	10	Final
Russia (Drozdov)	0	0	2	0	1	0	1	0	2	X	6
China (Liu) 🔨	2	1	0	2	0	2	0	2	0	X	9

=== Draw 10 ===
Sunday, 16 February, 09:00

Sheet A	1	2	3	4	5	6	7	8	9	10	Final
United States (Shuster) 🔨	0	0	2	2	0	1	0	1	0	0	6
Canada (Jacobs)	2	1	0	0	2	0	0	0	2	1	8

Sheet B	1	2	3	4	5	6	7	8	9	10	Final
Great Britain (Murdoch) 🔨	0	2	0	1	0	0	1	0	2	0	6
Norway (Ulsrud)	0	0	2	0	2	1	0	1	0	1	7

Sheet C	1	2	3	4	5	6	7	8	9	10	Final
Sweden (Edin) 🔨	0	2	0	1	0	2	0	2	1	X	8
Russia (Drozdov)	0	0	2	0	1	0	1	0	0	X	4

=== Draw 11 ===
Sunday, 16 February, 19:00

Sheet A	1	2	3	4	5	6	7	8	9	10	Final
Norway (Ulsrud) 🔨	0	1	0	1	0	1	1	0	0	1	5
Switzerland (Michel)	0	0	1	0	1	0	0	0	1	0	3

Sheet B	1	2	3	4	5	6	7	8	9	10	11	Final
China (Liu)	0	0	2	0	3	1	0	0	0	2	0	8
Canada (Jacobs) 🔨	0	2	0	1	0	0	2	1	2	0	1	9

Sheet C	1	2	3	4	5	6	7	8	9	10	Final
Germany (Jahr)	0	0	2	0	0	1	0	0	0	X	3
Denmark (Stjerne) 🔨	0	2	0	1	0	0	2	0	1	X	6

Sheet D	1	2	3	4	5	6	7	8	9	10	Final
United States (Shuster)	0	0	0	2	0	0	1	0	1	X	4
Sweden (Edin) 🔨	0	3	0	0	1	1	0	1	0	X	6

=== Draw 12 ===
Monday, 17 February, 14:00

Sheet A	1	2	3	4	5	6	7	8	9	10	Final
China (Liu) 🔨	1	0	0	2	0	0	1	1	0	1	6
Great Britain (Murdoch)	0	1	1	0	0	1	0	0	2	0	5

Sheet B	1	2	3	4	5	6	7	8	9	10	Final
Germany (Jahr)	0	0	2	0	2	0	1	0	1	1	7
Russia (Drozdov) 🔨	2	0	0	2	0	2	0	2	0	0	8

Sheet C	1	2	3	4	5	6	7	8	9	10	Final
Switzerland (Michel) 🔨	1	1	0	0	1	0	2	1	0	X	6
United States (Shuster)	0	0	0	1	0	1	0	0	1	X	3

Sheet D	1	2	3	4	5	6	7	8	9	10	Final
Norway (Ulsrud)	0	0	2	0	0	1	0	0	0	X	3
Denmark (Stjerne) 🔨	0	1	0	2	0	0	0	0	2	X	5

== Tiebreaker ==
Tuesday, 18 February, 9:00

Sheet C	1	2	3	4	5	6	7	8	9	10	Final
Norway (Ulsrud) 🔨	1	0	1	0	2	0	0	0	1	0	5
Great Britain (Murdoch)	0	1	0	1	0	0	0	2	0	2	6

Player percentages
Norway		Great Britain	
Håvard Vad Petersson	94%	Michael Goodfellow	94%
Christoffer Svae	80%	Scott Andrews	78%
Torger Nergård	79%	Greg Drummond	88%
Thomas Ulsrud	85%	David Murdoch	90%
Total	84%	Total	87%

== Playoffs ==
Semifinals
1	Sweden	5
4	Great Britain	6
2	Canada	10
3	China	6

Gold medal game
4	Great Britain	3
2	Canada	9
Bronze medal game
1	Sweden	6
3	China	4

=== Semifinals ===
Wednesday, 19 February, 19:00

Sheet B	1	2	3	4	5	6	7	8	9	10	Final
Sweden (Edin) 🔨	0	0	2	0	0	0	1	0	2	0	5
Great Britain (Murdoch)	0	1	0	0	1	1	0	1	0	2	6

Player percentages
Sweden		Great Britain	
Viktor Kjäll	85%	Michael Goodfellow	94%
Fredrik Lindberg	85%	Scott Andrews	83%
Sebastian Kraupp	70%	Greg Drummond	88%
Niklas Edin	74%	David Murdoch	86%
Total	78%	Total	88%

Sheet D	1	2	3	4	5	6	7	8	9	10	Final
Canada (Jacobs) 🔨	1	0	2	0	1	0	3	0	3	X	10
China (Liu)	0	1	0	1	0	2	0	2	0	X	6

Player percentages
Canada		China	
Ryan Harnden	97%	Zang Jialiang	93%
E. J. Harnden	85%	Ba Dexin	79%
Ryan Fry	94%	Xu Xiaoming	79%
Brad Jacobs	83%	Liu Rui	75%
Total	90%	Total	81%

=== Bronze medal game ===
Friday, 21 February, 12:30

Sheet C	1	2	3	4	5	6	7	8	9	10	11	Final
China (Liu)	0	0	1	0	0	2	0	0	1	0	0	4
Sweden (Edin) 🔨	0	1	0	1	0	0	1	0	0	1	2	6

Player percentages
China		Sweden	
Zang Jialiang	86%	Viktor Kjäll	94%
Ba Dexin	91%	Fredrik Lindberg	88%
Xu Xiaoming	81%	Sebastian Kraupp	76%
Liu Rui	86%	Niklas Edin	94%
Total	86%	Total	88%

=== Gold medal game ===
Friday, 21 February, 17:30

Sheet C	1	2	3	4	5	6	7	8	9	10	Final
Canada (Jacobs) 🔨	2	0	3	1	0	2	0	1	X	X	9
Great Britain (Murdoch)	0	1	0	0	1	0	1	0	X	X	3

Player percentages
Canada		Great Britain	
Ryan Harnden	94%	Michael Goodfellow	92%
E. J. Harnden	92%	Scott Andrews	67%
Ryan Fry	81%	Greg Drummond	88%
Brad Jacobs	95%	David Murdoch	69%
Total	91%	Total	79%
