= Viktor Kjäll =

Swedish curler

- Curler
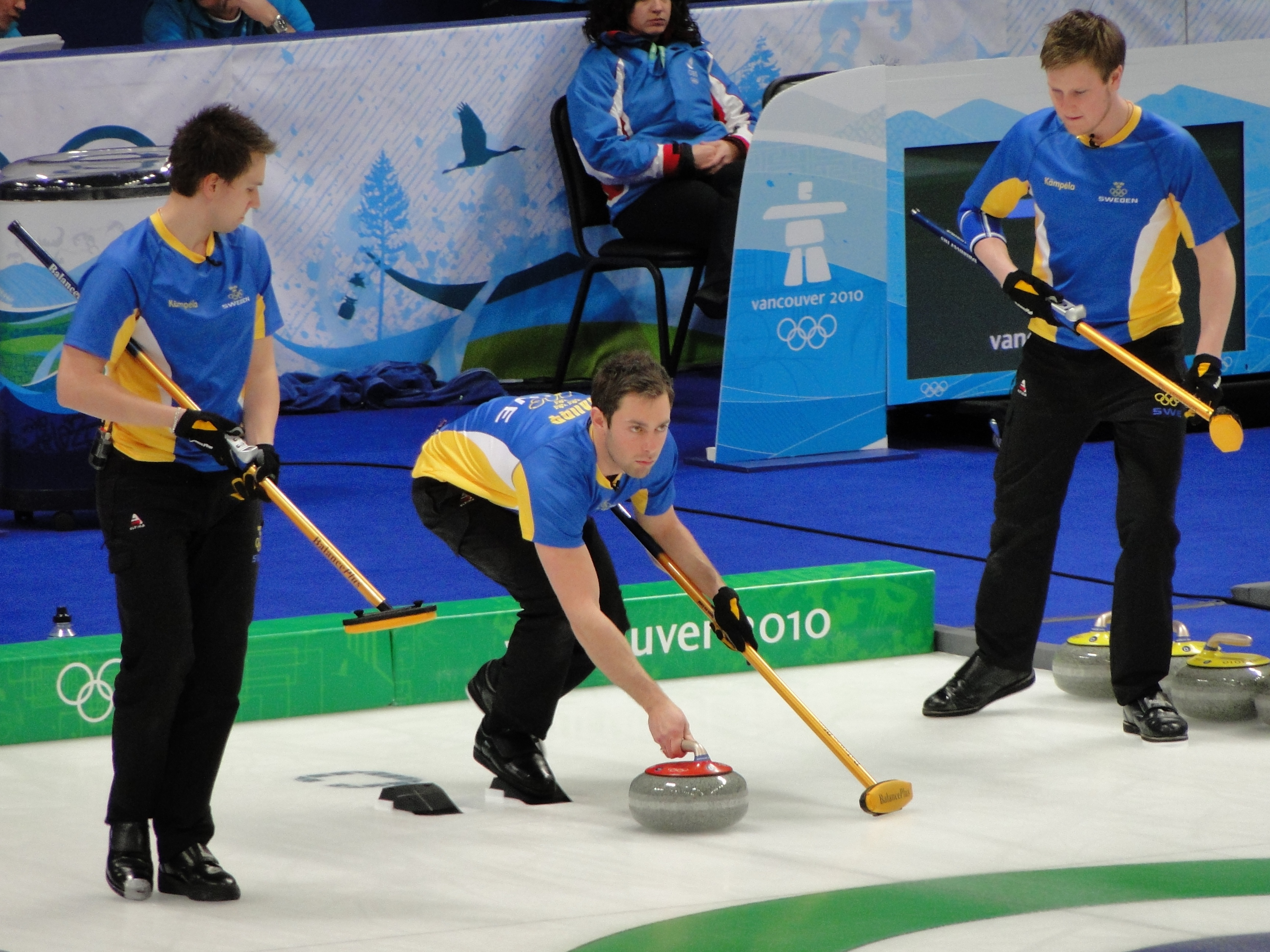
- Born: 13 June 1985 (age 41); Skerike, Västerås, Sweden

Team
- Curling club: Karlstads CK, Karlstad, Sweden

Curling career
- World Championship: 4 (2007, 2011, 2012, 2013)
- European Championship: 6 (2007, 2009, 2010, 2011, 2012, 2013)
- Olympic: 2 (2010, 2014)
Medal record
Curling
Olympic Games
Bronze medal – third place	2014 Sochi
World Championships
Gold medal – first place	2013 Victoria
Bronze medal – third place	2011 Regina
Bronze medal – third place	2012 Basel
European Championships
Gold medal – first place	2009 Aberdeen
Gold medal – first place	2012 Karlstad
Silver medal – second place	2011 Moscow
Winter Universiade
Gold medal – first place	2009 Harbin
Bronze medal – third place	2007 Pinerolo

Viktor Erik Kjäll (Swedish pronunciation: [ˈvɪ̌kːtɔr ˈêːrɪk ˈɕɛlː] anglicized as Kjell; born 13 June 1985) is a Swedish curler originally from Karlstad. He is the bronze medalist at 2014 Winter Olympics.

== Curling career ==
Viktor Kjäll made his World Championship debut at the 2007 Edmonton World Championships as the Second for Sweden's most successful male skip at that time, Peja Lindholm. They finished with a 6–5 record in a four-way tie for fourth place. In the tie-breaking rounds, they lost to the eventual Silver Medalists Team Germany skipped by Andy Kapp.

After Peja Lindholm's retirement, Kjäll eventually made his way onto Niklas Edin's team. Their first major competition was the 2009 European Championships held in Aberdeen, Scotland. They lost just two matches in the round robin and went on to win both of their playoff matches against Team Ulsrud of Norway and Team Stöckli of Switzerland to win the Gold Medal.

Kjäll's team had been selected as Team Sweden for the 2010 Winter Olympics in Vancouver, British Columbia, Canada and most recently for Team Sweden for the 2014 Winter Olympics in Sochi, Russia where they captured a bronze medal.

After a career on the ice, Kjäll began coaching. He coached the Kyle Smith Scottish team from 2015 to 2018. Between 2018 and 2022, Kjäll was the team coach for Team Jennifer Jones, and coached them when they represented Canada at the 2022 Winter Olympics in Beijing.

In 2011, he was inducted into the Swedish Curling Hall of Fame.

== Personal life ==
After his curling career in Sweden, he moved to Whitby, Ontario. He is married and has one daughter and works as the Curling Manager at The Granite Club in Toronto. In September 2022, it was announced that Kjäll was appointed the new national coach for the Swiss Curling Association.

As of July 2023 he is a National Coach with Curling Canada.

== Teammates ==
2009 Aberdeen European Championships

2010 Vancouver Olympic Games

2014 Sochi Olympic Games

- Niklas Edin, Skip
- Sebastian Kraupp, Third
- Fredrik Lindberg, Second
- Oskar Eriksson, Alternate

2007 Edmonton World Championships

- Peja Lindholm, Skip
- James Dryburgh, Third
- Anders Eriksson, Lead
- Magnus Swartling, Alternate
