= Michael Goodfellow (curler) =

Scottish curler (born 1988)

- Curler
- Born: 8 October 1988 (age 38); Stirling, Scotland

Team
- Curling club: Stirling Young Curlers / Kilsyth CC; Stirling, Scotland

Curling career
- Member Association: Scotland; Great Britain
- World Championship: 4 (2011, 2012, 2013, 2017)
- European Championship: 4 (2012, 2013, 2015, 2019)
- Olympic: 1 (2014)
- Grand Slam victories: 1 (2018 National)
Medal record
Curling
Representing Great Britain
Olympic Games
Silver medal – second place	2014 Sochi
Representing Scotland
World Curling Championships
Silver medal – second place	2011 Regina
Silver medal – second place	2012 Basel
Bronze medal – third place	2013 Victoria
European Curling Championships
Bronze medal – third place	2013 Stavanger
Bronze medal – third place	2019 Helsingborg

Michael Goodfellow (born 8 October 1988) is a retired Scottish curler. He is the silver medalist at 2014 Winter Olympics. He currently is employed as a coach for Scottish Curling, winning the 2025 World Championship as coach of Bruce Mouat's team.

== Career ==
As a youth, Goodfellow played in two Winter Universiades, one in 2009 and 2011. He played lead at the 2009 Winter Universiade for the British team, skipped by John Hamilton. They finished 7th. He was the British alternate at the 2011 Winter Universiade, on a team skipped by Glen Muirhead that finished 4th. Despite being the team's alternate, he played in 8 round robin games.

On the World Curling Tour, Goodfellow played lead for Jamie Dick for 2008–09 before joining with Muirhead for 2009–10 to play lead for him. He joined the Tom Brewster rink in 2010 and played lead for Brewster, and then for David Murdoch beginning in 2013.

With Brewster, Goodfellow won three straight Scottish championships between 2011 and 2013. With the team, he won silver medals at the 2011 Ford World Men's Curling Championship and 2012 World Men's Curling Championship and a bronze medal at the 2013 Ford World Men's Curling Championship with Murdoch as skip. Goodfellow played in two European Curling Championship as an altnerate on the team. At the 2012 European Curling Championships, the team finished 7th, and Goodfellow would play in 7 games. The team won a bronze medal at the 2013 European Curling Championships, with Goodfellow playing in 11 games.

February 2014 saw Goodfellow make his Team GB Winter Olympic debut at the Sochi 2014 games alongside David Murdoch, Tom Brewster, Scott Andrews and Greg Drummond. The team took bronze at the 2013 European Championships. The team also represented Scotland at the 2017 World Men's Curling Championship, finishing in 6th.

After on season playing for Greg Drummond, Goodfellow joined the Ross Paterson rink in 2018. The team went on to win the 2018 National Grand Slam of Curling event and a bronze medal at the 2019 European Curling Championships.

Goodfellow retired from curling in 2021.

== Personal life ==
Goodfellow is married.
