= Sebastian Kraupp =

Swedish curler (born 1985)

- Curler
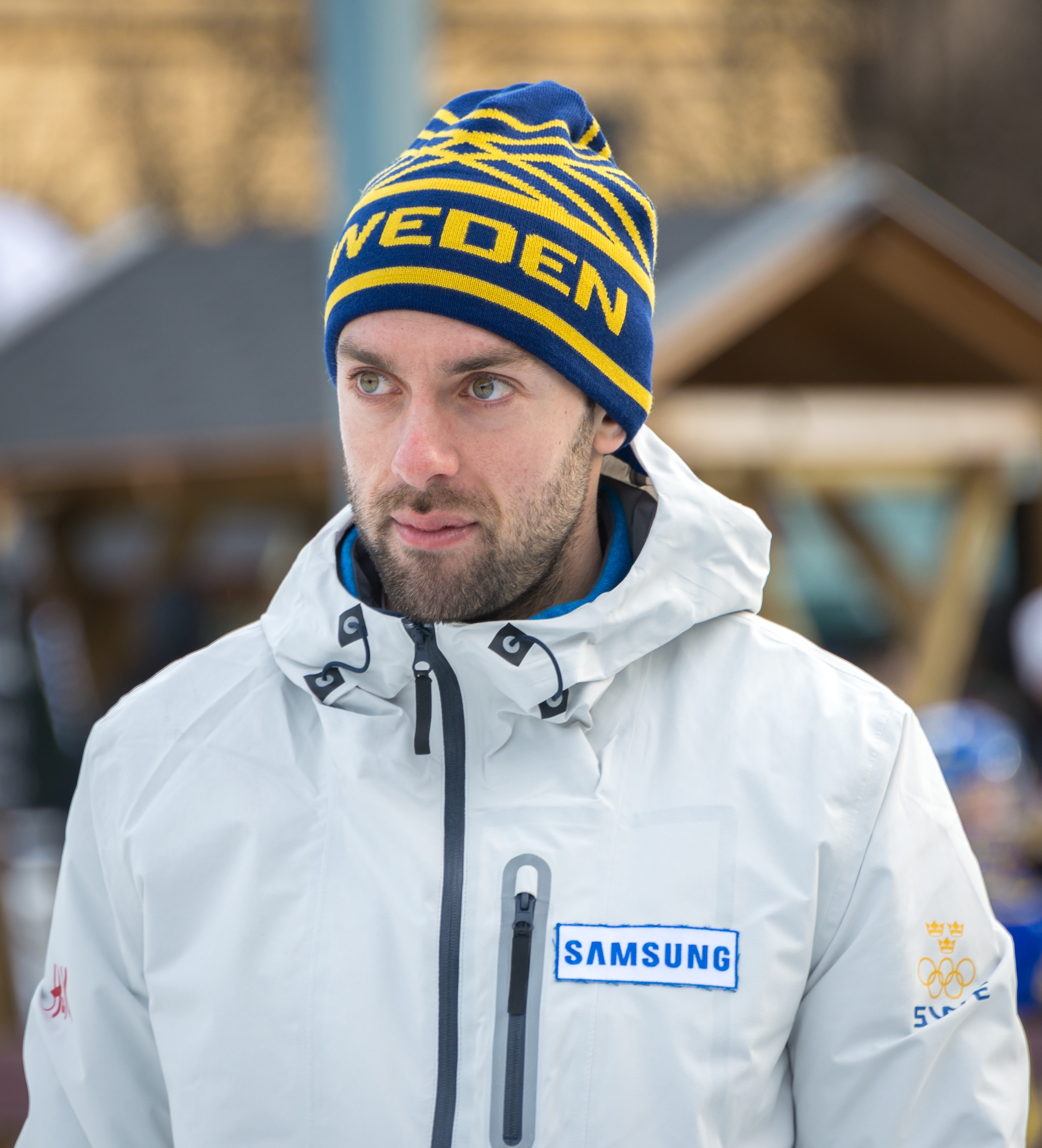
- Born: 20 May 1985 (age 41); Stockholm, Sweden

Team
- Curling club: Karlstads CK, Karlstad, Sweden

Curling career
- World Championship: 3 (2011, 2012, 2013)
- European Championship: 4 (2009, 2010, 2011, 2012)
- Olympic: 2 (2010, 2014)
Medal record
Curling
Olympic Games
Bronze medal – third place	2014 Sochi
World Championships
Gold medal – first place	2013 Victoria
Bronze medal – third place	2011 Regina
Bronze medal – third place	2012 Basel
European Championships
Gold medal – first place	2009 Aberdeen
Gold medal – first place	2012 Karlstad
Silver medal – second place	2011 Moscow
World Junior Championships
Silver medal – second place	2005 Pinerolo
European Mixed Championship
Silver medal – second place	2005 Andorra
Winter Universiade
Gold medal – first place	2009 Harbin
Bronze medal – third place	2007 Pinerolo

Sebastian Kraupp (born 20 May 1985) is a Swedish curler from Karlstad, Sweden. He currently coaches the Swedish men's junior team. He is the bronze medalist at 2014 Winter Olympics.

From 2005 to 2008 Sebastian Kraupp skipped his own team. Starting with the 2008–2009 season he joined Niklas Edin's team throwing Third stones.

Team Edin first achieved widespread attention at the 2009 Aberdeen European Championships where they stunned the curling competition by finishing second after the round robin tournament with a 7 – 2 record. Their only loses were to Team Murdoch of Scotland and Team Ulsrud of Norway who had won the Gold and Bronze medals respectively at the 2009 Moncton World Championships. In the 1 vs. 2 Playoff Game Kraupp's team took on Team Ulsrud of Norway who they upset 7 to 3 advancing directly to the Gold Medal match. In the final they faced Ralph Stöckli's team from Switzerland. They pulled off another upset and won their first European title.

Sebastian Kraupp and his team represented Sweden at the 2010 Winter Olympics. Team Sweden finished the Round Robin portion in a tie for the Playoffs with Team Great Britain, which they won. In the semifinal match they lost to Team Canada skipped by Kevin Martin. They lost to Team Switzerland in the Bronze medal match and finished fourth overall matching the achievement of Team Sweden at the 2002 Salt Lake City Olympics.

In 2011 he was inducted into the Swedish Curling Hall of Fame.

== Teammates ==
2009 Aberdeen European Championships

2010 Vancouver Olympic Games

2014 Sochi Olympic Games

Niklas Edin, Skip

Fredrik Lindberg, Second

Viktor Kjäll, Lead

Oskar Eriksson, Alternate
