= Fredrik Lindberg =

Swedish curler

- Curler
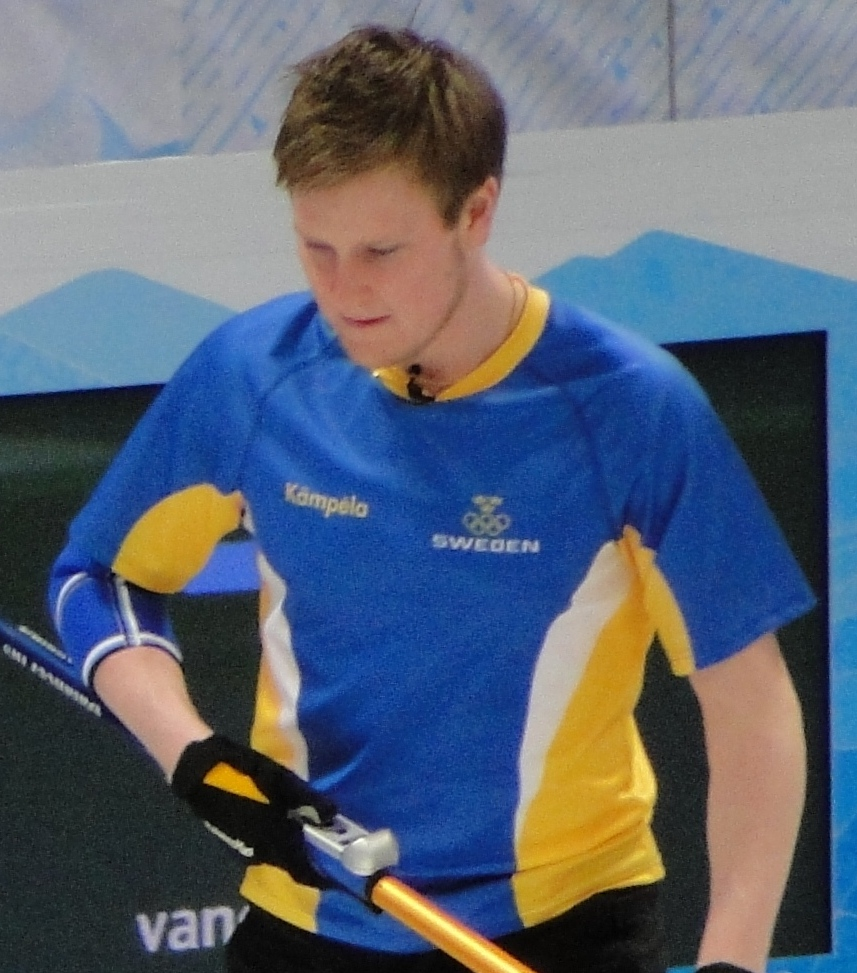
- Born: 2 February 1986 (age 40); Upplands-Bro, Upplands-Bro Municipality, Sweden

Curling career
- Member Association: Sweden
- World Championship: 3 (2011, 2012, 2013)
- European Championship: 5 (2009, 2010, 2011, 2012, 2013)
- Olympic: 2 (2010, 2014)
Medal record
Men's curling
Representing Sweden
Olympic Games
Bronze medal – third place	2014 Sochi
World Championships
Gold medal – first place	2013 Victoria
Bronze medal – third place	2011 Regina
Bronze medal – third place	2012 Basel
European Championships
Gold medal – first place	2009 Aberdeen
Gold medal – first place	2012 Karlstad
Silver medal – second place	2011 Moscow
World Junior Championships
Gold medal – first place	2004 Trois-Rivières
Silver medal – second place	2006 Jeonju
Silver medal – second place	2007 Eveleth
Winter Universiade
Gold medal – first place	2009 Harbin
Bronze medal – third place	2007 Pinerolo

Bengt Fredrik Lindberg (born 2 February 1986) is a Swedish curler from Karlstad. Lindberg grew up in Hede. He is the bronze medalist at 2014 Winter Olympics.

From 2006 until 2008 he played both Third and Second positions for Sebastian Kraupp. In 2009 he and Kraupp joined Niklas Edin's team with Lindberg throwing Second stones. Lindberg moved to Karlstad in the process.

At their first major tournament, the 2009 Aberdeen European Championships, Fredrik Lindberg and his team pulled off several upsets against established senior teams including reigning 2009 World Bronze Medalists Team Ulsrud from Norway. They lost just two matches in the round robin portion and went on to win both of their Playoff matches defeating Team Switzerland in the Gold Medal match.

Lindberg and his team represented Sweden at the 2010 Winter Olympics in Vancouver, British Columbia, Canada where they placed fourth.

Since the 2010 Olympics, the Edin team won the 2013 Ford World Men's Curling Championship, the 2012 European Curling Championships, won silver at the 2011 European Curling Championships and bronze medals at the 2011 and 2012 World Curling Championships.

In 2011 he was inducted into the Swedish Curling Hall of Fame.

== Coaching career ==
After his retirement from curling to focus on his relationship with fellow curler Alison Kreviazuk in 2014, he remained a part of team Edin as a coach, later becoming national team coach. Peja Lindholm then became the Swedish national coach.

== Personal life ==
Lindberg is married to Alison Kreviazuk.

== Teammates ==
2009 Aberdeen European Championships

2010 Vancouver Olympic Games

2014 Sochi Olympic Games

Niklas Edin, Skip

Sebastian Kraupp, Third

Viktor Kjäll, Lead

Oskar Eriksson, Alternate
