= List of teams on the 2012–13 World Curling Tour =

Following is a list of teams that will participate in the 2012–13 World Curling Tour.

== Men ==
As of December 9, 2012

Skip	Third	Second	Lead	Alternate	Locale
Bowie Abbis-Mills	Craig Van Ymeren	Ed Cyr	Geoff Chambers		Aylmer, Ontario
Brian Adams, Jr.	Michael Makela	Andy Peloza	Phil Kennedy		Thunder Bay, Ontario
Mike Anderson	Chris Van Huyse	Matt Sheppard	Sean Harrison		Markham, Ontario
Sam Antila	Jonathan Sawatzky	Ian Graham	Jeff Antila		Thompson, Manitoba
Tom Appelman	Brent Bawel	Ted Appelman	Brendan Melnyk		Edmonton, Alberta
Mike Aprile	Scott McGregor	Scott Hindle	Shawn Cottrill		Listowel, Ontario
Rob Armitage	Keith Glover	Randy Ponich	Wilf Edgar		Red Deer, Alberta
Benno Arnold	Ramon Hess	Timon Schiumph	Rene Senn	Sascha Martz	Basel, Switzerland
Evgeny Arkhipov	Sergey Glukhov	Dmitry Mironov	Artur Ali	Timur Gadzhikhanov	Moscow, Russia
Mike Assad	Ben Mikkelsen	Jordan Potts	Mike Davis		Thunder Bay, Ontario
Alexander Attinger	Felix Attinger	Daniel Schifferli	Simon Attinger		Switzerland
Randy Baird		Chase Schmitt	Josh Bahr		Bemidji, Minnesota
Greg Balsdon	Mark Bice	Tyler Morgan	Jamie Farnell	Steve Bice	Toronto, Ontario
Alexander Baumann	Manuel Walter	Sebastian Schweizer	Jörg Engesser		Baden, Germany
Kent Beadle	Randy Cumming	Vince Bernet	John Ustice		St. Paul, Minnesota
Ryan Berg	Al Gulseth	Mark Gulseth	Jordan Brown		West Fargo, North Dakota
Andrew Bilesky	Stephen Kopf	Derek Errington	Aaron Watson		Vancouver, British Columbia
Daniel Birchard	Kelly Fordyce	Brody Moore	Andrew Peck		Winnipeg, Manitoba
Steve Birklid	Chris Bond	Matt Birklid	Atticus Wallace		(Washington (state)) Seattle, Washington
Todd Birr	Doug Pottinger	Tom O'Connor	Kevin Birr		Mankato, Minnesota
Scott Bitz	Jeff Sharp	Aryn Schmidt	Dean Hicke		Regina, Saskatchewan
Matthew Blandford	Evan Asmussen	Brent Hamilton	Brad Chyz		Calgary, Alberta
Dave Boehmer	William Kuran	Shawn Magnusson			Petersfield, Manitoba
Trevor Bonot	Allen Macsemchuk	Chris Briand	Tim Jewett		Thunder Bay, Ontario
Andy Borland	Joe Zezel	John Borland	Mark Borland		Hibbing, Minnesota
Brendan Bottcher	Micky Lizmore	Bradley Thiessen	Karrick Martin		Edmonton, Alberta
Don Bowser	Jonathan Beuk	Matt Broder	TJ Connolly		Ottawa, Ontario
Derek Bowyer	Denton Koch	Colton Koch	Josh Bowyer		Medicine Hat, Alberta
Adam Gagné (fourth)	Doug Brewer	Trevor Brewer (skip)	Chris Gannon		Brockville, Ontario
Tom Brewster	Greg Drummond	Scott Andrews	Michael Goodfellow	David Murdoch	Aberdeen, Scotland
Richard Brower	Jan Bos	Larry MacDonald	Deryk Brower		British Columbia
Craig Brown	Kroy Nernberger	Matt Hamilton	Jon Brunt		Madison, Wisconsin
Scott Brown	Evan Workin	Parker Shook	Spencer Tuskowski	Ryan Westby	Fargo, North Dakota
Randy Bryden	Troy Robinson	Brennen Jones	Trent Knapp		Regina, Saskatchewan
Mike Bryson	Wesley Forget	Danny Dow	Scott Chadwick		Toronto, Ontario
Bryan Burgess	Mike Pozihun	Dale Weirsema	Pat Berezoski		Thunder Bay, Ontario
Kurtis Byrd	Isaac Keffer	Josh Szajewski	Mike Zsakai		Thunder Bay, Ontario
Mike Calcagno	Brad Casper	Peter Sommer	Jeremy Dinsel		(Washington (state)) Seattle, Washington
Pierre Charette	Richard Faguy	Louis Biron	Maurice Cayouette		Buckingham, Quebec
Brady Clark	Sean Beighton	Darren Lehto	Steve Lundeen		(Washington (state)) Seattle, Washington
Jason Clarke	William Sutton	Ken Miscovitch	Zac Capron		Victoria, British Columbia
Chris Gardner (fourth)	Mathew Camm	Brad Kidd	Bryan Cochrane (skip)		Ottawa, Ontario
Dave Collyer	Evan Sullivan	Bill Leitch	Peter Aker		Belleville, Ontario
Terry Corbin	Dave Pallen	Dave Ellis	Ted Anderson		Toronto, Ontario
Denis Cordick	Grant Gunn	Kevin Stringer	Richard Garden		Toronto, Ontario
Peter Corner	Graeme McCarrel	Ian Tetley	Trevor Wall		Brampton, Ontario
Jim Cotter	Jason Gunnlaugson	Tyrel Griffith	Rick Sawatsky		Kelowna/Vernon, British Columbia
Wes Craig	Kevin Britt	Tony Anslow			Victoria, British Columbia
Warren Cross	Dean Darwent	Jim Wallbank	Chad Jones		Edmonton, Alberta
Mark Dacey	Tom Sullivan	Steve Burgess	Andrew Gibson		Halifax, Nova Scotia
Chad Dahlseide	James Wenzel	Jamie Chisholm	Rob Lane		Calgary, Alberta
Brian Damon	Michael Stefanik	Charles Skinner, Jr.	Scott Parmalee		(New York (state)) Schenectady, New York
Neil Dangerfield	Dennis Sutton	Darren Boden	Glen Allen		Victoria, British Columbia
Scott DeCap	Ron Douglas	John Maskiewich	Grant Olsen		Kamloops, British Columbia
Benoît Schwarz (fourth)	Peter de Cruz (skip)	Dominik Märki	Valentin Tanner		Geneva, Switzerland
Don DeLair	Greg Hill	Chris Blackwell	Stephen Jensen		Airdrie, Alberta
Lloyd Hill		Maurice Sonier	Jim Brooks		Calgary, Alberta
Dayna Deruelle	Andrew McGaugh	Kevin Lagerquist	Evan DeViller		Brampton, Ontario
Robert Desjardins	Jean-Sébastien Roy	Steven Munroe	Steeve Villeneuve		Chicoutimi, Quebec
Philip DeVore	Seppo Sormunen	Doug Cameron	Roger Hendrickson		Duluth, Minnesota
Kyle Doering	Conner Njegovan	Derek Oryniak	Kyle Kurz		Winnipeg, Manitoba
Chris Dolan	Cam McLelland	Tim Jeanetta	Brian Sparstad		St. Paul, Minnesota
Shawn Donnelly	Kendall Warawa	Curtis Der	Neal Woloschuk		Edmonton, Alberta
Korey Dropkin	Mark Fenner	Connor Hoge	Alex Fenson	Thomas Howell	Wayland, Massachusetts
Stephen Dropkin	Alex Leichter	Nate Clark	Matt Mielke		Boston, Massachusetts
Tony Angiboust (fourth)	Thomas Dufour (skip)	Lionel Roux	Wilfrid Coulot		Chamonix, France
Matt Dumontelle	Jordan Chandler	Kyle Chandler	Gavin Jamieson		Sudbury, Ontario
Randy Dutiaume	Peter Nicholls	Dean Moxham	Greg Melnichuk		Winnipeg, Manitoba
Niklas Edin	Sebastian Kraupp	Fredrik Lindberg	Viktor Kjäll		Karlstad, Sweden
David Edwards	John Penny	Scott Macleod	Colin Campbell		Scotland
Scott Egger	Albert Gerdung	Darren Grierson	Robin Niebergall		Brooks, Alberta
Dave Elias	Kevin Thompson	Hubert Perrin	Chris Suchy		Winnipeg, Manitoba
Dan Elie	Daniel Caron	Paul Lodge	Dany Beaulieu		Otterburn Park, Quebec
Jody Epp	Blair Cusack	Brad Kocurek	James York		British Columbia
John Epping	Scott Bailey	Scott Howard	David Mathers		Toronto, Ontario
Jeffrey Erickson	Lionel Locke	Merlin Orvig	John Krenz		St. Paul, Minnesota
Kristian Lindström (fourth)	Oskar Eriksson (skip)	Markus Eriksson	Christoffer Sundgren		Karlstad, Sweden
Mike Farbelow	Kevin Deeren	Kraig Deeren	Mark Lazar		St. Paul, Minnesota
Eric Fenson	Trevor Andrews	Blake Morton	Calvin Weber		Bemidji, Minnesota
Pete Fenson	Shawn Rojeski	Joe Polo	Ryan Brunt		Bemidji, Minnesota
Martin Ferland	François Roberge	Shawn Fowler	Maxime Elmaleh		Quebec City, Quebec
Ian Fitzner-Leblanc (fourth)	Paul Flemming (skip)	Graham Breckon	Kelly Middelstadt		Halifax, Nova Scotia
Ryan Flippo	Quinn Evenson	Oliver Halvarson	Brandon Hall		Fairbanks, Alaska
Kyle Foster	Wes Jonasson	Rodney Legault	Darcy Jacobs		Arborg, Manitoba
Michael Fournier	Francois Gionest	Yannick Martel	Jean-François Charest		Montreal, Quebec
Rob Fowler	Allan Lyburn	Richard Daneault	Derek Samagalski		Brandon, Manitoba
Joe Frans	Ryan Werenich	Jeff Gorda	Shawn Kaufman		Bradford, Ontario
Mario Freiberger	Sven Iten	Pascal Eicher	Rainer Kobler		Zug, Switzerland
Steeve Gagnon	Martin Roy	Mike Coolidge	Olivier Beaulieu		Rosemère, Quebec
Sean Geall	Jay Peachey	Sebastien Robillard	Mark Olson		New Westminster, British Columbia
Brent Gedak	John Aston	Derek Owens	Malcolm Vanstone		Estevan, Saskatchewan
Christopher Plys (fourth)	Tyler George (skip)	Rich Ruohonen	Colin Hufman		Duluth, Minnesota
Tony Germsheid	Randy Guidinger	Conrad Yaremchuk			Edmonton, Alberta
Pierre Gervais	Guy Turner	Allain Maillette	Eric Lemaire		Trois-Rivières, Quebec
Dale Gibbs	William Raymond	James Honsvall	Perry Tholl		St. Paul, Minnesota
Geoff Goodland	Tim Solin	Pete Westberg	Ken Olson		St. Paul, Minnesota
John Grant	Jeff Grant	Kevin Flewwelling	Larry Tobin		Toronto, Ontario
Sean Grassie	Corey Chambers	Kody Janzen	Stuart Shiells		Winnipeg, Manitoba
James Grattan	Jason Roach	Darren Roach	Peter Case		(Canada) Oromocto, New Brunswick
Logan Gray	Ross Paterson	Alasdair Guthrie	Richard Woods		Stirling, Scotland
Richard Guidinger	Dale Fellows	Lyle Biever	Jeff Smith		Edmonton, Alberta
Ritvars Gulbis	Normunds Saršūns	Aivars Avotiņš	Roberts Krusts		Latvia
Brad Gushue	Adam Casey	Brett Gallant	Geoff Walker		St. John's, Newfoundland and Labrador
Al Hackner	Kory Carr	Kristofer Leupen	Gary Champagne		Thunder Bay, Ontario
Mark Haluptzok	Jon Chandler	Mark Fenner	Alex Fenson		Bemidji, Minnesota
Grant Hardie	Jay McWilliam	Hammy McMillan Jr.	Billy Morton		Dumfries, Scotland
Jeff Hartung	Kody Hartung	Tyler Hartung	Claire DeCock		Langenburg, Saskatchewan
Jeremy Harty	Cole Parsons	Joel Berger	Daniel LaCoste		Nanton, Alberta
Stefan Häsler	Christian Bangerter	Christian Roth	Jörg Lüthy		Bern, Switzerland
Marcus Hasselborg	Peder Folke	Andreas Prytz	Anton Sandström		Sweden
Cory Heggestad	Wayne Warren	Derek Abbotts	Scott Borland		Orillia, Ontario
Drew Heidt		Regis Neumeier	Shayne Hannon		Kindersley, Saskatchewan
Josh Heidt	Brock Montgomery	Matt Lang	Dustin Kidby		Kerrobert, Saskatchewan
Guy Hemmings	François Gagné	Ghyslain Richard	Christian Bouchard		Montreal, Quebec
Pascal Hess	Yves Hess	Florian Meister	Stefan Meienberg		Zug, Switzerland
Brent Ross (fourth)	Jake Higgs (skip)	Codey Maus	Bill Buchanan		Harriston, Ontario
Mark Homan	Mike McLean	Brian Fleischhaker	Nathan Crawford		Ottawa, Ontario
Darrell Houston	Sean Matheson	Joe Dirt	Tyler Jaeger		Kamloops, British Columbia
Glenn Howard	Wayne Middaugh	Brent Laing	Craig Savill		Coldwater, Ontario
Eugene Hritzuk	Ig Baranieski	Verne Anderson	Dave Folk		Saskatoon, Saskatchewan
Jeff Hulse	Craig Glassford	A. J Hulse	Adam Melen		Orangeville, Ontario
Brad Jacobs	Ryan Fry	E. J. Harnden	Ryan Harnden		Sault Ste. Marie, Ontario
Clint Dieno (fourth)	Jason Jacobson (skip)	Matt Froehlich	Chadd McKenzie		Saskatoon, Saskatchewan
Felix Schulze (fourth)	John Jahr (skip)	Peter Rickmers	Sven Goldemann	Christoph Daase	Hamburg, Germany
Matt Seabrook (fourth)	Mike Jakubo (skip)	Sandy MacEwan	Lee Toner		Sudbury, Ontario
Dave Jensen	Kent Beadle	Roger Smith			St. Paul, Minnesota
Evan Jensen	Daniel Metcalf	Dan Ruehl	Steve Gebauer		St. Paul, Minnesota
Mark Johnson	Jason Larway	Joel Larway	Christopher Rimple		(Washington (state)) Seattle, Washington
Wes Johnson	Punit Sthankiya	Kevin Hawkshaw	Mark Bresee		Toronto, Ontario
Dylan Johnston	Cody Johnston	Travis Showalter	Jay Turner		Thunder Bay, Ontario
Joel Jordison	Jason Ackerman	Brent Goeres	Curtis Horwath		Moose Jaw, Saskatchewan
Andy Jukich	Lyle Sige	Matt Zyblut	Duane Rutan		Duluth, Minnesota
Kevin Kakela	Adam Kitchens	Kyle Kakela	Travis Kitchens		Rolla, North Dakota
Aku Kauste	Jani Sullanmaa	Pauli Jäämies	Janne Pitko		Hyvinkää, Finland
Mark Kean	Travis Fanset	Patrick Janssen	Tim March		Toronto, Ontario
Harvey Keck	Waldo Gronsky	Jim Duggan	Jerrauld Lawler		Iowa City, Iowa
Mark Kehoe	Glen MacLeod	Ryan Garven	Richard Barker		Halifax, Nova Scotia
Greg Keith	Wilson Nelson	Curtis Daniels	Martin Pederson		Spruce Grove, Alberta
Glen Kennedy	Nathan Connolly	Brandon Klassen	Parker Konschuh		Edmonton, Alberta
Kim Chang-min	Kim Min-chan	Seong Se-hyeon	Seon Se-young		Uiseong, Gyeongbuk, South Korea
Jamie King	Blake MacDonald	Scott Pfeifer	Jeff Erickson		Edmonton, Alberta
Tyler Klymchuk	Corey Chester	Sanjay Bowry	Rhys Gamache		Vancouver, British Columbia
Craig Kochan	Matt Dumontelle	John McClelland			Thunder Bay, Ontario
Jamie Koe	Tom Naugler	Brad Chorostkowski	Rob Borden		Yellowknife, Northwest Territories
Kevin Koe	Pat Simmons	Carter Rycroft	Nolan Thiessen		Calgary, Alberta
Jared Kolomaya	Neil Katching	Kennedy Bird	Daniel Hunt		Stonewall, Manitoba
Parker Konschuh	Jacob Ortt	Michael Hauer	Mac Walton		Edmonton, Alberta
Bruce Korte	Dean Kleiter	Roger Korte	Rob Markowsky		Saskatoon, Saskatchewan
Ron Kowalchuk	Ed Pedersen	Ernie Surkan	John Bird		Thunder Bay, Ontario
David Kraichy	Andrew Irving	Brad Van Walleghem	Curtis Atkins		Winnipeg, Manitoba
Mikkel Krause	Oliver Dupont	Mads Nørgaard	Dennis Hansen	Kenneth Jørgensen	Hvidovre, Denmark
Denis Laflamme	Bernard Gingras	Claude Gagnon	Alain Lapierre		Sept-Îles, Quebec
Josh Lambden	Morio Kumagawa	Chris McDonah	Andrew Stevenson		Calgary, Alberta
Andy Lang	Daniel Herberg	Daniel Neuner	Andreas Kempf		Füssen, Germany
Art Lappalainen	Ron Rosengren	Tim Warkentin	Larry Rathjie		Thunder Bay, Ontario
Shane Latimer	Ritchie Gillan	Terry Scharf	Kevin Rathwell		Ottawa, Ontario
Steve Laycock	Kirk Muyres	Colton Flasch	Dallan Muyres		Saskatoon, Saskatchewan
Mike Kennedy (fourth)	Marc Lecocq (skip)	Jamie Brannen	Dave Konefal		Nackawic, New Brunswick
Simon Lejour	Yannick Lejour	Mathieu Lambert	Claude Chapdeelaine		Lacolle, Quebec
Philippe Lemay	Mathieu Beaufort	Jean-Michel Arsenault	Érik Lachance	Christian Cantin	Trois-Rivières, Quebec
Ryan Lemke	Nathan Gebert	John Lilla	Casey Konopacky		Medford, Wisconsin
Brian Lewis	Jeff McCrady	Steve Doty	Graham Sinclair		Ottawa, Ontario
Thomas Løvold	Thomas Due	Steffen Walstad	Sander Rølvåg		Norway
Sean Morris (fourth)	Mike Libbus (skip)	Brad MacInnis	Peter Keenan		Calgary, Alberta
Liu Rui	Xu Xiaoming	Zang Jialiang	Ba Dexin	Chen Lu'an	Harbin, China
Rob Lobel	Steven Lobel	Trevor Hewitt	Mike Shaye		Whitby, Ontario
William Lyburn	James Kirkness	Alex Forrest	Tyler Forrest		Winnipeg, Manitoba
Ian MacAulay	Steve Allen	Rick Allen	Barry Conrad		Ottawa, Ontario
Jeff MacDonald	Greg Doran	Brendan Berbenuik	Phil Tribe		Thunder Bay, Ontario
Eddie MacKenzie	Anson Carmody	Christian Tolusso	Alex MacFayden		Charlottetown, Prince Edward Island
Scott Madams	Braden Zawada	Ian Fordyce	Nigel Milnes		Winnipeg, Manitoba
Scott Manners	Tyler Lang	Ryan Deis	Mike Armstrong		North Battleford, Saskatchewan
Dave Manser	Jeremie Crone	Todd McCann	Mike Mulroy		Lethbridge, Alberta
Kelly Marnoch	Evan Reynolds	Branden Jorgenson	Chris Cameron		Carberry, Manitoba
Kevin Marsh	Matt Ryback	Daniel Marsh	Aaron Shutra		Saskatoon, Saskatchewan
Bert Martin	Lyle Kent	Rhett Friesz	Nathan Relitz		Airdrie, Alberta
Kevin Martin	John Morris	Marc Kennedy	Ben Hebert		Edmonton, Alberta
Ken McArdle	Jared Bowles	Dylan Somerton	Michael Horita		New Westminster, British Columbia
Justin McBride	Ryan Harty	Mark Piskura	Joel Calhoun		Orange County, California
Jeff Currie (fourth)	Mike McCarville (skip)	Colin Koivula	Jamie Childs		Thunder Bay, Ontario
Heath McCormick	Matt Hames	Bill Stopera	Dean Gemmell		(New York (state)) New York City, New York
Jack McDonald	Barry Paddock	Rodney Legault	Barrie Troop		Winnipeg, Manitoba
Scott McDonald	Ryan Myler	Chris De Cloet	Kevin Ackerman		London, Ontario
Mike McEwen	B.J. Neufeld	Matt Wozniak	Denni Neufeld		Winnipeg, Manitoba
Rick McKague	Jim Moats	Doug McNish	Paul Strandlund		Edmonton, Alberta
Terry McNamee	Steve Irwin	Travis Taylor	Travis Saban		Brandon, Manitoba
Terry Meek		Wade Johnston	Todd Brick		Calgary, Alberta
Steffen Mellemseter	Markus Høiberg	Steffen Walstad	Magnus Nedregotten	Stein Mellemseter	Norway
Russ Mellerup	Dan Kukko	Ron Evans	Mike Rutledge		Thunder Bay, Ontario
Jean-Michel Ménard	Martin Crête	Éric Sylvain	Philippe Ménard		Quebec City, Quebec
Ethan Meyers	Kyle Kakela	Trevor Host	Cameron Ross		Duluth, Minnesota
Sven Michel	Claudio Pätz	Sandro Trolliet	Simon Gempeler		Adelboden, Switzerland
Derek Miller	Adam Enright	Dustin Eckstrand	Matt Enright		Camrose, Alberta
Jim Milosevich	Dale Gibbs	Mark Lusche	Neil Kay		St. Paul, Minnesota
Leon Moch	Delvin Moch	Kyle Wagner	Greg Sjolie		Medicine Hat, Alberta
Jason Montgomery	Miles Craig	William Duggan	Josh Hozack		Duncan, British Columbia
Dennis Moretto	Paul Attard	Howard Steele	Mike Nelson		Woodbridge, Ontario
Yusuke Morozumi	Tsuyoshi Yamaguchi	Tetsuro Shimizu	Kosuke Morozumi		Karuizawa, Japan
Tim Morrison	Cary Luner	Dan Balachorek	Bruce Scott		Oshawa, Ontario
Darren Moulding	Scott Cruickshank	Shaun Planaden	Kyle Iverson		Calgary, Alberta
Glen Muirhead	David Reid	Steven Mitchell	Kerr Drummond		Perth, Scotland
Jamie Murphy	Jordan Pinder	Mike Bardsley	Don McDermaid		Halifax, Nova Scotia
David Nedohin	Colin Hodgson	Mike Westlund	Tom Sallows		Edmonton, Alberta
Sean O'Connor	Rob Johnson	Ryan O'Connor	Dan Bubola		Calgary, Alberta
Meico Öhninger	Andri Heimann	Kyrill Öhninger	Kevin Wunderlin		Switzerland
Brent Palmer	Richard Chorkawy	Gary Stanhope	Rob Gregg		Burlington, Ontario
Kevin Park	Shane Park	Josh Burns	Eric Richard		Edmonton, Alberta
Bob Genoway (fourth)	Mickey Pendergast (skip)	Kevin Pendergast	Terry Gair		Calgary, Alberta
Trevor Perepolkin	Tyler Orme	James Mackenzie	Chris Anderson		Vernon, British Columbia
Kris Perkovich	Aaron Wald	Kevin Johnson	Taylor Skalsky		Chisholm, Minnesota
Greg Persinger	Nick Myers	Sean Murray	Tim Gartner		Fairbanks, Alaska
Lowell Peterman	Fred Armstrong	Lyle Treiber	Steve Matejka		Red Deer, Alberta
Daley Peters	Chris Galbraith	Kyle Einarson	Mike Neufeld		Winnipeg, Manitoba
Dan Petryk (fourth)	Steve Petryk (skip)	Roland Robinson	Thomas Usselman		Calgary, Alberta
Marc Pfister	Roger Meier	Enrico Pfister	Raphael Märki		Switzerland
Brent Pierce	Jeff Richard	Kevin Recksiedler	Grant Dezura		New Westminster, British Columbia
Graham Powell	Kelsey Dusseault	Ken Powell	Chris Wall		Grande Prairie, Alberta
Jeff Puleo	Derek Surka	Joel Cooper (Note: Cooper is now known as JayCee due to gender transition.)	Cooper Smith		Forest Lake, Minnesota
Howard Rajala	J. P. Lachance	Chris Fulton	Paul Madden		Ottawa, Ontario
Scott Ramsay	Mark Taylor	Ross McFayden	Kyle Werenich		Winnipeg, Manitoba
Tomi Rantamaki	Jussi Uusipaavalniemi	Peeka Peura	Jermu Pollanen		Finland
Hammy McMillan (fourth)	Moray Combe	Sandy Reid (skip)	Sandy Gilmour		Stranraer, Scotland
Darko Reischek	Justin Reischek	Sheldon Oshanyk	Glen Ursel		Winnipeg, Manitoba
Jon Rennie	Jeff Inglis	Rob Collins	Eric Wasylenko		Calgary, Alberta
Kyle Richard	Matt Yeo	Neil Bratrud	Colin Huber		Gibbons, Alberta
Greg Richardson	Paul Winford	Dan Baird	Mike Potter		Ottawa, Ontario
Jeremy Roe	Steve Day	Richard Maskel	Mark Hartman		Madison, Wisconsin
Manuel Ruch	Jean-Nicolas Longchamp	Daniel Graf	Mathias Graf		Uitikon, Switzerland
Roman Ruch	Rolf Bruggmann	Felix Bader	Michael Devaux	Fabian Schmid	Uitikon, Switzerland
Robert Rumfeldt	Adam Spencer	Scott Hodgson	Greg Robinson		Guelph, Ontario
Tyler Runing	Dylan Deegan	Josh Moore	Eric Jaeger		Mankato, Minnesota
Howie Scales	David Tonnellier	Neil Scales	Martin Mueller	Todd Trevellyan	Swan River, Manitoba
Michael Schifferli	Luethi Hubert	Jonas Waechil	Sandro Portmann	Christian Durtschi	Bern, Switzerland
Brady Scharback	Quinn Hersikorn	Jake Hersikorn	Brady Kendel		Saskatoon, Saskatchewan
Joe Scharf	Trevor Clifford	Aaron Skillen	Bill Peloza		Thunder Bay, Ontario
Robert Schlender	Dean Ross	Don Bartlett	Chris Lemishka		Edmonton, Alberta
Thomas Scoffin	Dylan Gousseau	Landon Bucholz	Bryce Bucholz		Edmonton, Alberta
Wade Scoffin	Joe Wallingham	Will Mahoney	Mitchell Young		Whitehorse, Yukon
Tom Scott	Benjamin Wilson	Tony Wilson	John Scott		Hibbing, Minnesota
Urs Beglinger (fourth)	Reto Seiler (skip)	Urs Kuhn	Beat A. Stephan		St. Gallen, Switzerland
Graham Shaw	Brian Binnie	Richard Goldie	Rob Niven		Perth, Scotland
Randie Shen	Brendon Liu	Nicolas Hsu	Justin Hsu		Taipei, Chinese Taipei
John Shuster	Jeff Isaacson	Jared Zezel	John Landsteiner		Duluth, Minnesota
Lyle Sieg	Ken Trask	Benj Guzman	Duane Rutan		(Washington (state)) Seattle, Washington
Steen Sigurdson	Riley Smith	Ian McMillan	Nick Curtis		Winnipeg, Manitoba
David Šik	Radek Boháč	Karel Uher	Milan Polívka		Prague, Czech Republic
Justin Sluchinski	Aaron Sluchinski	Dylan Webster	Craig Bourgonje		Airdrie, Alberta
Kyle Smith	Thomas Muirhead	Kyle Waddell	Cammy Smith		Perth, Scotland
Mike Smith	Brad Thompson	Darren Nelson			Kamloops, British Columbia
Warwick Smith	David Smith	Alan Smith	Ross Hepburn		Perth, Scotland
Jiří Snítil	Martin Snítil	Jindřich Kitzberger	Marek Vydra		Brno, Czech Republic
Fabio Sola	Julien Genre	Simone Sola	Graziano Iacovetti		Italy
Jordan Steinke	Jason Ginter	Tristan Steinke	Brett Winfield		Dawson Creek, British Columbia
Doug MacKenzie (fourth)	Chad Stevens (skip)	Scott Saccary	Philip Crowell		Halifax, Nova Scotia
Matt Stevens	Cody Stevens	Robert Liapis	Jeff Breyen		Bemidji, Minnesota
Rasmus Stjerne	Johnny Frederiksen	Mikkel Poulsen	Troels Harry		Hvidovre, Denmark
Peter Stolt	Jerod Roland	Brad Caldwell	Erik Ordway		St. Paul, Minnesota
Jeff Stoughton	Jon Mead	Reid Carruthers	Mark Nichols		Winnipeg, Manitoba
Torkil Svensgaard	Martin Udh Gronbech	Morten Berg Thomsen	Daniel Dalgaard Abrahamsen		Hvidovre, Denmark
Charley Thomas	J. D. Lind	Dominic Daemen	Matthew Ng		Calgary, Alberta
Wade Thurber	Harvey Kelts	Rick Hjertaas	Eldon Raab		Red Deer, Alberta
Alexey Tselousov	Alexey Stukalsky	Andrey Drozdov	Artur Razhabov		Moscow, Russia
Wayne Tuck, Jr.	Chad Allen	Jay Allen	Caleb Flaxey		Toronto, Ontario
Jay Tuson	Colin Mantik	Glen Jackson	Ken Tucker		Victoria, British Columbia
Thomas Ulsrud	Torger Nergård	Christoffer Svae	Håvard Vad Petersson		Oslo, Norway
Markku Uusipaavalniemi	Tommi Häti	Jari Laukannen	Joni Ikonen		Finland
Japp van Dorp	Carlo Glasbergen	Miles MacLure	Joey Bruinsma		Benthuizen, Netherlands
Rob Van Kommer	Bart Witherspoon	Joey Witherspoon	Cale Dunbar	Zeke Scott	Carberry, Manitoba
Jason Vaughan	Jeremy Mallais	Paul Nason	Jared Bezanson		Saint John, New Brunswick
Daylan Vavrek	Carter Lautner	Daniel Wenzek	Cody Smith		Edmonton, Alberta
Brock Virtue	Braeden Moskowy	Chris Schille	D. J. Kidby		Regina, Saskatchewan
Steve Waatainen	Kevin Weinrich	Sean Krepps	Keith Clarke		Nanaimo, British Columbia
Michael Johnson (fourth)	Paul Cseke	Jay Wakefield (skip)	John Cullen		New Westminster, British Columbia
Brennan Wark	Jordan Potter	Kyle Toset	Joel Adams		Thunder Bay, Ontario
Zach Warkentin	Matt Roberts	Mackenzie Joblin	Will Perozak		Thunder Bay, Ontario
Neal Watkins	Grant Spicer	Dave McGarry	Kent Meyn		Swan River, Manitoba
Ken Watson	Dale Hockley	Randy Nelson	Dale Reibin		Surrey, British Columbia
Gary Weiss	Deron Surkan	Aaron Rogalski	Mark Beazley		Thunder Bay, Ontario
Bernhard Werthemann	Bastian Brun	Florian Zürrer	Päddy Käser		Switzerland
Wade White	Kevin Tym	Dan Holowaychuk	George White		Edmonton, Alberta
Jessi Wilkinson	Tyler Pfeiffer	Morgan Vandoesburg	Julian Sawiak		Edmonton, Alberta
Jeremy Hodges (fourth)	Matt Willerton (skip)	Craig MacAlpine	Chris Evernden	Dalen Peterson	Edmonton, Alberta
Mike Wood	Greg Hawkes	Sean Cromarty	Paul Awalt		Victoria, British Columbia
Evan Workin	Parker Shook	Cole Jaeger	Spencer Tuskowski		Fargo, North Dakota
Dustin Kalthoff (fourth)	Randy Woytowich (skip)	Lionel Holm	Lyndon Holm		Saskatoon, Saskatchewan
Kevin Yablonski	Vance Elder	Harrison Boss	Matthew McDonald		Calgary, Alberta
Brent Yamada	Corey Sauer	Doug Murdoch	Lance Yamada		Kamloops, British Columbia
Zou Dejia	Chen Lu'an	Ji Yangsong	Li Guangxu		Harbin, China

== Women ==
As of December 14, 2012

Skip	Third	Second	Lead	Alternate	Locale
Sarah Anderson	Kathleen Dubberstein	Taylor Anderson	Leilani Dubberstein	Abigail Suslavich	Philadelphia, Pennsylvania
Tiffany Anjema	Halyna Tepylo	Pam Feldkamp	Bridget Arnold		Waterloo, Ontario
Shinobu Aota	Anna Ohmiya	Mayo Yamaura	Kotomi Ishizaki	Natsuki Saito	Aomori, Japan
Meghan Armit	Nikki Hawrylyshen	Sarah Lund	Nadine Cabak-Ralph		Winnipeg, Manitoba
Mary-Anne Arsenault	Colleen Jones	Kim Kelly	Jennifer Baxter	Nancy Delahunt	Halifax, Nova Scotia
Cathy Auld	Janet Murphy	Stephanie Gray	Melissa Foster	Clancy Grandy	Mississauga, Ontario
Sarah Wark (fourth)	Nicole Backe (skip)	Kesa Van Osch	Janelle Erwin		Nanaimo, British Columbia
Marika Bakewell	Jessica Corrado	Stephanie Corrado	Jordan Robertson		Burlington, Ontario
Brett Barber	Robyn Silvernagle	Kailena Bay	Dayna Demmans		Regina, Saskatchewan
Penny Barker	Susan Lang	Melissa Hoffman	Danielle Sicinski		Moose Jaw, Saskatchewan
Ève Bélisle	Joelle Belley	Martine Comeau	Laura Thomas		Montreal, Quebec
Cheryl Bernard	Susan O'Connor	Lori Olson-Johns	Shannon Aleksic	Carolyn McRorie	Calgary, Alberta
Shannon Birchard	Nicole Sigvaldason	Sheyna Andries	Mondor Mariah		Winnipeg, Manitoba
Suzanne Birt	Shelly Bradley	Sarah Fullerton	Leslie MacDougall		Charlottetown, Prince Edward Island
Corryn Brown	Erin Pincott	Samantha Fisher	Sydney Fraser		Kamloops, British Columbia
Erika Brown	Debbie McCormick	Jessica Schultz	Ann Swisshelm		Madison, Wisconsin
Joelle Brown	Susan Baleja	Kyla Denisuik	Jennifer Cawson		Winnipeg, Manitoba
Chrissy Cadorin	Janet Langevinl	Sandy Becher	Cindy McKnight		Toronto, Ontario
Katie Cameron	Erika Sigurdson	Brandi Oliver	Lindsay Baldock		Stonewall, Manitoba
Chelsea Carey	Kristy McDonald	Kristen Foster	Lindsay Titheridge		Winnipeg, Manitoba
Alexandra Carlson	Monica Walker	Kendall Moulton	Jordan Moulton		Minneapolis, Minnesota
Candace Chisholm	Cindy Ricci	Natalie Bloomfield	Kristy Johnson		Regina, Saskatchewan
Cory Christensen	Rebecca Funk	Anna Bauman	Sonja Bauman		Duluth, Minnesota
Gabrielle Coleman	Britt Rjanikov	Ann Drummie	Mary Shields		San Francisco, California
Ginger Coyle	Lauren Wood	Laura Brown	Robyn Murphy		Dundas, Ontario
Laura Crocker	Sarah Wilkes	Rebecca Pattison	Jen Gates		Edmonton, Alberta
Marlo Dahl	Angela Lee-Wiwcharyk	Steph Davis	Kim Zsakai		Thunder Bay, Ontario
Lisa DeRiviere	Karen Klein	Jolene Rutter	Theresa Cannon		Winnipeg, Manitoba
Stacie Devereaux	Erin Porter	Lauren Wasylkiw	Heather Martin		St. John's, Newfoundland and Labrador
Deanna Doig	Kim Schneider	Colleen Ackerman	Michelle McIvor		Kronau, Saskatchewan
Tanilla Doyle	Joelle Horn	Lindsay Amundsen-Meyer	Christina Faulkner		Edmonton, Alberta
Daniela Driendl	Martina Linder	Marika Trettin	Analena Jentsch		Füssen, Germany
Chantelle Eberle	Nancy Inglis	Debbie Lozinski	Susan Hoffart		Regina, Saskatchewan
Kerri Einarson	Sara Van Walleghem	Liz Fyfe	Krysten Karwacki		Winnipeg, Manitoba
Brigid Ellig	Heather Van Sistine	Sara Shuster	Julia Boles		St. Paul, Minnesota
Lana Vey (fourth)	Michelle Englot (skip)	Roberta Materi	Sarah Slywka		Regina, Saskatchewan
Lisa Eyamie	Maria Bushell	Jodi Marthaller	Valerie Hamende		High River, Alberta
Karen Fallis	Sam Murata	Jennifer Clark-Rouire	Jillian Sandison		Winnipeg, Manitoba
Lisa Farnell	Erin Morrissey	Karen Sagle	Ainsley Galbraith		Elgin, Ontario
Binia Feltscher	Irene Schori	Franziska Kaufmann	Christine Urech		Switzerland
Stacey Fordyce	Kelsey Russill	Janelle Vachon	Roslynn Ripley		Brandon, Manitoba
Liane Fossum	Shana Marchessault	Victoria Anderson	Lisa Auld		Thunder Bay, Ontario
Alicia Wegner (fourth)	Ashlee Foster (skip)	Jennifer Stiglitz	Giselle Gervais		Lloydminster, Alberta
Diane Foster	Judy Pendergast	Terri Loblaw	Sue Fulkerth		Calgary, Alberta
Tammy Foster	Suzette Parahoniak	Nicole Stroh			Medicine Hat, Alberta
Kirsten Fox	Kristen Recksiedler	Trysta Vandale	Dawn Suliak		New Westminster, British Columbia
Rachel Fritzler	Ashley Quick	Amy Merkosky	Natalie Yanko		Saskatoon, Saskatchewan
Satsuki Fujisawa	Miyo Ichikawa	Emi Shimizu	Miyuki Satoh	Chiaki Matsumura	Karuizawa, Japan
Kerry Galusha	Sharon Cormier	Megan Cormier	Wendy Miller	Shona Barbour	Yellowknife, Northwest Territories
Tiffany Game	Vanessa Pouliot	Jennifer Van Wieren	Melissa Pierce		Edmonton, Alberta
Jaimee Gardner	Allison Farrell	Kim Brown	Trish Scharf		Ottawa, Ontario
Diana Gaspari	Giorgia Apollonio	Chiara Olivieri	Claudia Alvera	Federica Apollonio	Cortina d'Ampezzo, Italy
Oxana Gertova	Alina Kovaleva	Alina Biktimirova	Olesya Gluschenko		Moscow, Russia
Linn Githmark	Pia Trulsen	Ingrid Michalsen	Camilla Groseth	Henriette Lovar	Oslo, Norway
Brittany Gregor	Lindsay Blyth	Hayley Furst	Tara Tanchak		Calgary, Alberta
Jenna Haag	Chloe Pahl	Grace Gabower	Erin Wallace	Brittany Falk	Janesville, Wisconsin
Becca Hamilton	Molly Bonner	Tara Peterson	Sophie Brorson		Madison, Wisconsin
Teryn Hamilton	Holly Scott	Logan Conway	Karen Vanthuyne	Kaylee Moline	Calgary, Alberta
Jacqueline Harrison	Kimberly Tuck	Susan Froud	Heather Nicol		Waterdown, Ontario
Janet Harvey	Cherri-Ann Loder	Kristin Loder	Carey Kirby		Winnipeg, Manitoba
Jennifer Harvey	Lisa Lalonde	Julie Bridger	Lynn Macdonell		Cornwall, Ontario
Julie Hastings	Christy Trombley	Stacey Smith	Katrina Collins		Thornhill, Ontario
Dezaray Hawes	Gabrielle Plonka	Ali Renwick	Caitlin Campbell		New Westminster, British Columbia
Amber Holland	Jolene Campbell	Brooklyn Lemon	Dailene Sivertson		Regina, Saskatchewan
Rachel Homan	Emma Miskew	Alison Kreviazuk	Lisa Weagle		Ottawa, Ontario
Tracy Horgan	Jenn Seabrook	Jenna Enge	Amanda Gates		Sudbury, Ontario
Juliane Jacoby	Franziska Fischer	Josephine Obermann	Sibylle Maier		Füssen, Germany
Michèle Jäggi	Marisa Winkelhausen	Stéphanie Jäggi	Melanie Barbezät		Bern, Switzerland
Heather Jensen	Shana Snell	Heather Rogers	Carly Quigley		Airdrie, Alberta
Jiang Yilun	Wang Rui	Yaoi Mingyue	She Quitong	Liu Sijia	Harbin, China
Lisa Johnson	Michelle Kryzalka	Natalie Holloway	Shawna Nordstrom		Spruce Grove, Alberta
Jennifer Jones	Kaitlyn Lawes	Jill Officer	Dawn Askin	Kirsten Wall	Winnipeg, Manitoba
Sherry Just	Alyssa Despins	Sharlene Clarke	Jenna Harrison		Saskatoon, Saskatchewan
Selena Kaatz	Briane Meilleur	Kristin MacCuish	Katherine Doerksen		Winnipeg, Manitoba
Ashley Kallos	Oye-Sem Won	Larissa Mikkelson	Jessica Williams		Thunder Bay, Ontario
Jessie Kaufman	Nicky Kaufman	Kelly Erickson	Stephanie Enright	Cori Morris	Edmonton, Alberta
Tirzah Keffer	Megan Westlund	Sheree Hinz	Rachel Camlin		Thunder Bay, Ontario
Nancy Martin (fourth)	Kara Kilden (skip)	Lindsay Bertschi	Krista White		Saskatoon, Saskatchewan
Colleen Kilgallen	Janice Blair	Lesle Cafferty	Leslie Wilson		Pinawa, Manitoba
Kim Eun-jung	Kim Gyeong-ae	Kim Seon-yeong	Kim Yeong-mi		Gyeongbuk, South Korea
Kim Ji-sun	Lee Seul-bee	Shin Mi-sung	Gim Un-chi		South Korea
Cathy King	Carolyn Morris	Lesley McEwen	Doreen Gares		Edmonton, Alberta
Shelly Kinney	Amy Lou Anderson	Theresa Hoffoss	Julie Smith		Minnesota
Shannon Kleibrink	Bronwen Webster	Kalynn Park	Chelsey Matson		Calgary, Alberta
Linda Klímová	Kamila Mošová	Pavla Proksiková	Katerina Urbanová		Czech Republic
Sarah Koltun	Chelsea Duncan	Patty Wallingham	Jenna Duncan		Whitehorse, Yukon
Jackie Komyshyn	Riki Komyshyn	Stacey Olson	Kelsey Hinds		Winnipeg, Manitoba
Tina Kozak	Erin Mahoney	Betty Buurma	Suzie Scott		Carberry, Manitoba
Roberta Kuhn	Karla Thompson	Michelle Ramsay	Christen Wilson	Kristen Gentile	Vernon, British Columbia
Patti Lank	Mackenzie Lank	Nina Spatola	Caitlin Maroldo		(New York (state)) Lewiston, New York
Marie-France Larouche	Brenda Nicholls	Véronique Grégoire	Amélie Blais		Lévis, Quebec
Stefanie Lawton	Sherry Anderson	Sherri Singler	Marliese Kasner		Saskatoon, Saskatchewan
Charrissa Lin	Sherri Schummer	Emilia Juocys	Senja Lopac		New Haven, Connecticut
Katie Lindsay	Nicole Westlund	Jenn Clark	Stephanie Thompson		Welland, Ontario
Kim Link	Maureen Bonar	Angela Wickman	Renee Fletcher	Pam Kolton	East St. Paul, Manitoba
Allison MacInnes	Grace MacInnes	Diane Gushulak	Jacalyn Brown		Kamloops, British Columbia
Kelly MacIntosh	Jennifer Crouse	Sheena Gilman	Shelley Barker	Julie McEvoy	Dartmouth, Nova Scotia
Lindsay Makichuk	Amy Janko	Jessica Monk	Kristina Hadden		Edmonton, Alberta
Marla Mallett	Kelly Shimizu	Shannon Ward	Barb Zbeetnoff	Danielle Callens	Cloverdale, British Columbia
Anne Malmi	Oona Kauste	Heidi Hossi	Marjo Hippi	Tiina Suuripaa	Finland
Lauren Mann	Patricia Hill	Jen Ahde	Jessica Barcauskas		Ottawa, Ontario
Chana Martineau	Pam Appleman	Brittany Zelmer	Jennifer Sheehan	Diane McNallie	Edmonton, Alberta
Krista McCarville	Ashley Miharija	Kari Lavoie	Sarah Lang		Thunder Bay, Ontario
Deb McCreanor	Ashley Meakin	Heather Carsen	Laurie MacDonnell		La Salle, Manitoba
Jonna McManus	Sara McManus	Anna Huhta	Sofia Mabergs		Sweden
Joyance Meechai	Casey Cucchiarelli	Jen Cahak	Courtney Shaw		(New York (state)) New York, New York
Angie Melaney	Dominique Lascelles	Marteen Lorti	Jennifer Rosborough		Lakefield, Ontario
Sherry Middaugh	Jo-Ann Rizzo	Lee Merklinger	Leigh Armstrong		Coldwater, Ontario
Ekaterina Antonova (fourth)	Victorya Moiseeva (skip)	Galina Arsenkina	Aleksandra Saitova	Alina Kovaleva	Moscow, Russia
Michelle Montford	Courtney Blanchard	D'Arcy Maywood	Sarah Neufeld		Winnipeg, Manitoba
Nicole Montgomery	Kayte Gyles	Megan Montgomery	Cynthia Parton		New Westminster, British Columbia
Kristie Moore	Blaine Richards	Michelle Dykstra	Amber Cheveldave		Grande Prairie, Alberta
Katie Morrissey	Kiri Campbell	Lorelle Weiss	Cassandra de Groot		Ottawa, Ontario
Mari Motohashi	Yurika Yoshida	Megumi Mabuchi	Yumi Suzuki		Kitami, Japan
Jill Mouzar	Stephanie LeDrew	Danielle Inglis	Hollie Nicol	Courtney Davies	Toronto, Ontario
Eve Muirhead	Anna Sloan	Vicki Adams	Claire Hamilton		Stirling, Scotland
Morgan Muise	Lyndsay Allen	Sarah Horne	Sara Gartner-Frey		Calgary, Alberta
Larissa Murray	Amanda Craigie	Leah Mihalicz	Nicole Lang		Regina, Saskatchewan
Heather Nedohin	Beth Iskiw	Jessica Mair	Laine Peters		Edmonton, Alberta
Lene Nielsen	Helle Simonsen	Jeanne Ellegaard	Maria Poulsen		Hvidovre, Denmark
Allison Nimik	Katie Pringle	Lynn Kreviazuk	Morgan Court		Toronto, Ontario
Amy Nixon	Nadine Chyz	Whitney Eckstrand	Tracy Bush		Calgary/Red Deer, Alberta
Anette Norberg	Cecilia Östlund	Sabina Kraupp	Sara Carlsson		Härnösand, Sweden
Tiffany Odegard	Vanessa Pouliot	Jennifer Van Wieren	Melissa Pierce		Edmonton, Alberta
Ayumi Ogasawara	Yumie Funayama	Kaho Onodera	Michiko Tomabechi	Chinami Yoshida	Sapporo, Japan
Lori Olsen	Heather Tyre	Christine Ledrew			Kamloops, British Columbia
Chantal Osborne	Joëlle Sabourin	Catherine Derick	Sylvie Daniel		Thurso, Quebec
Mirjam Ott	Carmen Schäfer	Carmen Küng	Janine Greiner		Davos, Switzerland
Cathy Overton-Clapham	Jenna Loder	Ashley Howard	Breanne Meakin		Winnipeg, Manitoba
Trish Paulsen	Kari Kennedy	Sarah Collins	Kari Paulsen		Saskatoon, Saskatchewan
Laura Payne	Alexis Riordan	Lynsey Longfield	Ailsa Leitch		Ottawa, Ontario
Jocelyn Peterman	Brittany Tran	Rebecca Konschuh	Kristine Anderson		Red Deer, Alberta
Cassie Potter	Jamie Haskell	Jackie Lemke	Steph Sambor	Laura Roessler	St. Paul, Minnesota
Allison Pottinger	Nicole Joraanstad	Natalie Nicholson	Tabitha Peterson		St. Paul, Minnesota
Stephanie Prinse	Merit Thorson	Casey Freeman	Amanda Tipper	Nicky Block	Chilliwack, British Columbia
Julie Reddick	Carrie Lindner	Megan Balsdon	Laura Hickey		Toronto, Ontario
Marilou Richter	Darah Provencal	Jessie Sanderson	Sandra Comadina		New Westminster, British Columbia
Darcy Robertson	Tracey Lavery	Venessa Foster	Michelle Kruk		Winnipeg, Manitoba
Kelsey Rocque	Keely Brown	Taylor Macdonald	Claire Tully		Edmonton, Alberta
Leslie Rogers	Suzanne Walker	Jenilee Goertzen	Kelsey Latawiec		Edmonton, Alberta
Allison Ross	Audree Dufresne	Brittany O'Rourke	Sasha Beauchamp		Montreal, Quebec
Karen Rosser	Cheryl Reed	Amanda Tycholis	Andrea Tirschmann		Springfield, Manitoba
Kristen Fewster (fourth)	Jen Rusnell (skip)	Patti Knezevic	Rhonda Camozzi		Prince George, British Columbia
Jennifer Schab	Sheri Pickering	Jody Kiem	Heather Hansen	Donna Phillips	Calgary, Alberta
Casey Scheidegger	Michele Smith	Jessie Scheidegger	Kimberly Anderson		Lethbridge, Alberta
Desiree Schmidt	Brittany Palmer	Courtney Schmidt	Heather Nichol		Castlegar, British Columbia
Kelly Scott	Jeanna Schraeder	Sasha Carter	Sarah Wazney	Jacquie Armstrong	Kelowna, British Columbia
Penny Shantz	Sandra Jenkins	Kate Horne	Sherry Heath		Vernon, British Columbia
Jill Shumay	Kara Johnston	Taryn Holtby	Jinaye Ayrey		Saskatoon, Saskatchewan
Ashley Skjerdal	Jordan Maas	Shelby Hubick	Amanda Kuzyk		Regina, Saskatchewan
Anna Sidorova	Liudmila Privivkova	Margarita Fomina	Ekaterina Galkina	Nkeiruka Ezekh	Moscow, Russia
Maria Prytz (fourth)	Christina Bertrup	Maria Wennerström	Margaretha Sigfridsson (skip)		Umea, Sweden
Jamie Sinclair	Holly Donaldson	Erin Jenkins	Katelyn Wasylkiw		Manotick, Ontario
Margie Smith	Norma O'Leary	Debbie Dexter	Shelly Kosal		St. Paul, Minnesota
Heather Smith-Dacey	Stephanie McVicar	Blisse Comstock	Teri Lake		Halifax, Nova Scotia
Miranda Solem	Vicky Persenger	Karlie Koenig	Chelsea Solem		Cohasset, Minnesota
Renée Sonnenberg	Lawnie MacDonald	Cary-Anne Sallows	Rona Pasika		Edmonton, Alberta
Barb Spencer	Katie Spencer	Ainsley Champagne	Raunora Westcott		Winnipeg, Manitoba
Jennifer Spencer	Karyn Issler	Jenn Ellard	Michelle Laidlaw		Guelph, Ontario
Iveta Staša-Šaršūne	Ieva Krusta	Zanda Bikše	Dace Munča	Una Grava-Germane	Jelgava, Latvia
Tiffany Steuber	Megan Anderson	Lisa Miller	Cindy Westgard		Edmonton, Alberta
Ros Stewart	Patty Hersikorn	Brandee Borne	Andrea Rudulier		Saskatoon, Saskatchewan
Heather Strong	Laura Strong	Erica Trickett	Stephanie Korab	Noelle Thomas-Kennell	St. John's, Newfoundland and Labrador
Karallee Swabb	Brenda Doroshuk	Melanie Swabb	Paula Knight		Edmonton, Alberta
Valerie Sweeting	Dana Ferguson	Joanne Taylor	Rachelle Pidherny		Edmonton, Alberta
Adina Tasaka	Rachelle Kallechy	Lindsae Page	Kelsi Jones		New Westminster, British Columbia
Taylore Theroux	Alison Kotylak	Chelsea Duncan	Danielle Schiemann		Edmonton, Alberta
Kelly Thompson	Susan Hicks	Lisa Robitaille	Kimberly Hall		Castlegar, British Columbia
Jill Thurston	Kristen Phillips	Brette Richards	Kendra Georges		Winnipeg, Manitoba
Brandi Tinkler	Ashley Nordin	Alexandra Nash-McLeod			Victoria, British Columbia
Silvana Tirinzoni	Marlene Albrecht	Esther Neuenschwander	Sandra Gantenbein		Aarau, Switzerland
Terry Ursel	Wanda Rainka	Kendell Kohinski	Lisa Davie		Plumas, Manitoba
Alyssa Vandepoele	Heather Maxted	Katelyn Williams	Ashley Jahns		Winnipeg, Manitoba
Kalia Van Osch	Marika Van Osch	Brooklyn Leitch	Carly Sandwith		Victoria, British Columbia
Rhonda Varnes	Tanya Rodrigues	Nicol McNiven	Breanne Merklinger		Ottawa, Ontario
Ellen Vogt	Tiina Suuripää	Maija Salmiovirta	Riikka Louhivuori		Finland
Candace Wanechko	Natalie Hughes	Kara Lindholm	Kandace Lindholm		Edmonton, Alberta
Wang Bingyu	Liu Yin	Yue Qingshuang	Zhou Yan		Harbin, China
Kimberly Wapola	Cynthia Eng-Dinsel	Carol Strojny	Ann Flis		St. Paul, Minnesota
Crystal Webster	Erin Carmody	Geri-Lynn Ramsay	Samantha Preston		Calgary, Alberta
Brittany Whittemore	Julia Gavin	Jessica Henricks	Alana Pinkoski		Edmonton, Alberta
Holly Whyte	Heather Steele	Cori Dunbar	Jamie Forth	Deena Benoit	Edmonton, Alberta
Kelly Wood	Teejay Haichert	Kelsey Dutton	Janelle Tyler		Swift Current, Saskatchewan
Amy Wright	Courtney George	Aileen Sormunen	Amanda McLean		Duluth, Minnesota
Sayaka Yoshimura	Rina Ida	Risa Ujihara	Mao Ishigaki		Sapporo, Japan
Olga Zharkova	Julia Portunova	Alisa Tregub	Julia Guzieva	Ekaterina Sharapova	Moscow, Russia
Nola Zingel	Heather Kuntz	Jill Watson	Melissa McKee		Lloydminster, Alberta
Olga Zyablikova	Victorya Moiseeva	Ekaterina Antonova	Galina Arsenkina		Moscow, Russia
