= List of teams on the 2011–12 World Curling Tour =

Following is a list of teams on the World Curling Tour which participated in the 2011–12 curling season.

== Men ==
As of December 5, 2011

Skip	Third	Second	Lead	Alternate	Locale
Bowie Abbis-Mills	Craig Van Ymeren	Geoff Chambers	Terry Arnold		Waterloo, Ontario
Gerry Adam	Warren Jackson	Dustin Kalthoff	Lyndon Holm		Yorkton, Saskatchewan
Josh Adams	Keith Coulthart	Craig Skochinski	John Sherar		Ottawa, Ontario
Brian Adams Jr.	Mark Adams	Michael Makela	Phil Kennedy		Thunder Bay, Ontario
Chad Allen	Travis Fanset	Jay Allen	Jim Clayton		Brantford, Ontario
Mike Anderson	Chris Van Huyse	Matt Mapletoft	Sean Harrison		Markham, Ontario
Sam Antila	Curtis Ross	Ian Graham	Cory Boisvert		Thompson, Manitoba
Tom Appelman	Adam Enright	Brandon Klassen	Nathan Connolly		Edmonton, Alberta
Mike Aprile	Scott McGregor	Scott Hindle	Shawn Cottrill		Waterloo, Ontario
Evgeniy Arkhipov	Sergei Glukhov	Dmitry Mironov	Arthu Ali		Russia
Mike Assad	Al Hackner	Kory Carr	Jamie Childs		Thunder Bay, Ontario
Josh Bahr	Chris Bond	Atticus Wallace	John Muller		Bemidji, Minnesota
Greg Balsdon	Chris Ciasnocha	Tyler Morgan	Jamie Farnell		Kingston, Ontario
Christian Bangerter	Stefan Schori	Daniel Inversini	Jurg Stettler		Switzerland
Felix Schulze (fourth)	Christopher Bartsch (skip)	Sven Goldemann	Peter Rickmers		Germany
Brent Bawel	Mike Jantzen	Sean O'Connor	Hardi Sulimma		Calgary, Alberta
Sean Beighton	Andrew Ernst	Sam Galey	Mac Guy		(Washington (state)) Seattle, Washington
Denis Belanger	John Grant	Mark Koivula	Dennis Lemon		Toronto, Ontario
Ryan Lemke (fourth)	John Benton (skip)	Jake Will	Steve Day		Medford, Wisconsin
Ryan Berg	Mitchell Oakland	Al Gulseth	Jordan Brown		West Fargo, North Dakota
Mark Bice	Codey Maus	Steve Bice	Jamie Danbrook		Sarnia, Ontario
Andrew Bilesky	Stephen Kopf	Derek Errington	Aaron Watson		New Westminster, British Columbia
Graeme Black	Neil McKinlay	Colin Howden	Ross McKinlay		Lockerbie, Scotland
Todd Birr	Greg Romaniuk	Doug Pottinger	Tom O'Connor		Mankato, Minnesota
Scott Bitz	Mark Lang	Aryn Schmidt	Dean Hicke		Regina, Saskatchewan
Matthew Blandford	Tom Sallows	Mike Westlund	Chris Sanford		Cold Lake, Alberta
Derek Boe	Erwin Hanley	Dean Cursons	Cory Hubick		Regina, Saskatchewan
David Bohn	Andrew Irving	Dennis Bohn	Larry Solomon		Winnipeg, Manitoba
Joey Bonfoey	Joel Dietz	Matt Carlson	Ted Trolson		Duluth, Minnesota
Trevor Bonot	Allen Macsemchuk	Scott McCallum	Tim Jewett		Northern Ontario
Brendan Bottcher	Bradley Thiessen	Micky Lizmore	Karrick Martin		Edmonton, Alberta
Brent Braemer	Mike Friesen	Dan Winters	Brandon Smart-Braemer	Troy Kirkpatrick	Winnipeg, Manitoba
Robert Brewer	Al Belec	Dusty Jakomait	Greg McLellan		Sault Ste. Marie, Ontario
Tom Brewster	Greg Drummond	Scott Andrews	Michael Goodfellow		Aberdeen, Scotland
Craig Brown	Matt Hamilton	Kroy Nernberger	Derrick Casper		Madison, Wisconsin
David Brown	Leon Romaniuk	Jeremy Roe	Richard Maskel		Madison, Wisconsin
Randy Bryden	Troy Robinson	Trent Knapp	Kelly Knapp		Regina, Saskatchewan
Rob Bucholz	Evan Asmussen	Landon Bucholz	Bryce Bucholz		Edmonton, Alberta
Bryan Burgess	Gary Weiss	Dale Wiersema	Pat Berezowski		Northern Ontario
Joseph Calabrese	Michael Mengel	Jeremy Peters	Brian Anderson		(New York (state)) Rochester, New York
Mathew Camm	Peter Steski	Andrew Hamilton	Ed Cyr		Ottawa, Ontario
Jack Carr	Gordon Williams	Joe Marques	Lance Reid		Thunder Bay, Ontario
Serge Reid (fourth)	Francois Gionest	Simon Collin	Pierre Charette (skip)		Saguenay, Quebec
Jerry Chudley	Kevin Cooley	Kyle Csversko	Paul Robertson		Neepawa, Manitoba
Bryan Cochrane	Rich Moffatt	Chris Fulton	John Steski		Ottawa, Ontario
Dave Collyer	Evan Sullivan	Bill Leitch	Peter Aker		Belleville, Ontario
Brandon Corbett	Sean Murray	Mark Mooney	Michael Graziano		(New York (state)) New York City
Peter Corner	Graeme McCarrel	Joe Frans	Darryl Prebble		Brampton, Ontario
Jim Cotter	Kevin Folk	Tyrel Griffith	Rick Sawatsky		Kelowna/Vernon, British Columbia
Dale Craig	Jeremy Chevrier	Cory Fleming	Chad Petracek		Saskatoon, Saskatchewan
Wes Craig	Greg Hawkes	William Sutton	Stu Merrifield		Victoria, British Columbia
Mitch Criton		Ray Sthamann	Bob Sonder		Regina, Saskatchewan
Warren Cross	Dean Darwent	Kyle Richard	Colin Huber		Edmonton, Alberta
Randy Cumming	Mike Schneeberger	Vince Bernet	John Eustice		Mankato, Minnesota
Jeff Currie	Dylan Johnston	Cody Johnston	Mike Badiuk		Thunder Bay, Ontario
Brian Damon	Michael Stefanik	Peter Drechsler	Arthur Merkley		(New York (state)) Schenectady, New York
Neil Dangerfield	Dennis Sutton	Darren Boden	Glen Allen		Victoria, British Columbia
Benoit Schwarz (fourth)	Peter de Cruz (skip)	Gilles Vuille	Valentin Tanner		Switzerland
Carl deConinck Smith	Jeff Sharp	Chris Haichert	Jesse St. John		Rosetown, Saskatchewan
Robert Desjardins	Jean-Sébastien Roy	Steven Munroe	Steeve Villeneuve		Chicoutimi, Quebec
Philip DeVore	Pete Westberg	Seppo Sormunen	Duane Rutan		Duluth, Minnesota
Stephen Dropkin	Korey Dropkin	Thomas Howell	Derek Corbett		Southborough, Massachusetts
Matt Dumontelle	Jordan Chandler	Kyle Chandler	Gavan Jamieson		Sudbury, Ontario
Dean Dunstone	Ken Tresoor	Taren Gesell	Greg Melnichuk		Winnipeg, Manitoba
Mike Eberle	Shane Vollman	Chris Krasowski	Travis McEachern		Regina, Saskatchewan
Scott Edie	Jack Stopera	Dennis Mellerup	Bill Peskoff		Middletown, Maryland
Niklas Edin	Sebastian Kraupp	Fredrik Lindberg	Viktor Kjäll		Karlstad, Sweden
David Edwards	John Penny	Scott MacLeod	Colin Campbell		Aberdeen, Scotland
Scott Egger	Lloyd Hill	Terry Morishita	Robin Niebergall	Maurice Sonier	Brooks, Alberta
Dave Elias	Kevin Thompson	Hubert Perrin	Chris Suchy		Winnipeg, Manitoba
Jody Epp	Blair Cusack	James Yorke	Brad Kocurek		Victoria, British Columbia
John Epping	Scott Bailey	Scott Howard	David Mathers		Toronto, Ontario
Kristian Lindström (fourth)	Oskar Eriksson (skip)	Henrik Leek	Alexander Lindström		Lit, Sweden
Mike Farbelow	Kevin Deeren	Kraig Deeren	Tim Solin		Minneapolis, Minnesota
Eric Fenson	Trevor Andrews	Quentin Way	Mark Lazar		Bemidji, Minnesota
Pete Fenson	Shawn Rojeski	Joe Polo	Ryan Brunt		Bemidji, Minnesota
David Nedohin (fourth)	Randy Ferbey (skip)	Ted Appelman	Brendan Melnyk		Edmonton, Alberta
Martin Ferland	Francois Roberge	Shawn Fowler	Maxime Elmaleh		Quebec City, Quebec
Perry Fisher	Kevin Cullen	Brett McGregor	Sean Martin		Nesbitt, Manitoba
Ian Fitzner-Leblanc	Paul Flemming	Robbie Doherty	Kelly Mittelstadt		Halifax, Nova Scotia
Kyle Foster	Wes Jonasson	Shawn Magnusson	Darcy Jacobs		Arborg, Manitoba
Michael Fournier	Dwayne Fowler	Simon Lejour	Yannick Lejour		Montreal, Quebec
Rob Fowler	Allan Lyburn	Richard Daneault	Derek Samagalski		Brandon, Manitoba
Chris Galbraith	Travis Bale	Bryan Galbraith	Rodney Legault		Winnipeg, Manitoba
Brian Galebach	Richard Ashford	Eric Clawson	Brandon Kiraly		Columbia, Maryland
Brett Gallant	Eddie MacKenzie	Anson Carmody	Alex MacFadyen		Charlottetown, Prince Edward Island
Chris Gardner	Don Bowser	Brad Kidd	Simon Barrick		Ottawa, Ontario
Brent Gedak	John Aston	Derek Owens	Malcolm Vanstone		Regina, Saskatchewan
Tyler George	Chris Plys	Rich Ruohonen	Aanders Brorson		Duluth, Minnesota
Albert Gerdung	Vance Elder	Darren Grierson	Trevor Slupski		Brooks, Alberta
Dale Gibbs	William Raymond	James Honsvall	Merlin Eddy		Woodbury, Minnesota
Chris Girling	Chris Faa	Mike Merklinger	Sean Ramsay		Kelowna, British Columbia
Brent Goeres	Cirtus Horwath	Andrew Foreman	Brad Schneider		Regina, Saskatchewan
James Gordon	Geoff McBain	Adam Knutson	Cliff Walker		Saskatoon, Saskatchewan
Sean Grassie	Corey Chambers	Kody Janzen	Stuart Shiells		Winnipeg, Manitoba
James Grattan	Charlie Sullivan, Jr.	Steven Howard	Peter Case		Oromocto, New Brunswick
Logan Gray	Alasdair Guthrie	Steve Mitchell	Sandy Gilmour		Stirling, Scotland
Ritvars Gulbis	Ainārs Gulbis	Normunds Šaršūns	Aivars Avotiņš		Riga, Latvia
Jason Gunnlaugson	Justin Richter	Jason Ackerman	David Kraichy		Beausejour, Manitoba
Brad Gushue	Ryan Fry	Geoff Walker	Adam Casey		St. John's, Newfoundland and Labrador
Lyle Sieg (fourth)	Jeff Tomlinson	Doug Schaak	Benj Guzman (skip)		(Washington (state)) Seattle, Washington
Mark Hadway	Rob Fischer	Gord Wood	Jason Beyette		Dauphin, Manitoba
Krisztián Hall	György Nagy	Gábor Észöl	Lajos Belleli		Hungary
John Hamilton	Philip Garden	Jamie Dick	Graeme Copland		Edinburgh, Scotland
Frazer Hare	Robbie Dick	Jamie Strawthorn	Don Frame		Scotland
Eric Harnden	Clint Cudmore	Brady Barnett	Marc Barette		Sault Ste. Marie, Ontario
Mike Harris	Jim Wilson	Scott Foster	Ken McDermott		Oakville, Ontario
Wayne Harris	Richard Tanguay	Alan de Jersey	Rick Thomson		Comox Valley, British Columbia
Jeff Hartung	Kody Hartung	Craig Kaeding	Shayne Hannon		Langenburg, Saskatchewan
Stefan Häsler	Stefan Rindlisbacher	Thomas Rubin	Jörg Lüthy		Switzerland
Marcus Hasselborg	Peder Folke	Andreas Prytz	Anton Sandström		Sweden
Toni Müller (fourth)	Jan Hauser (skip)	Marco Ramstein	Jürg Bamert		Zürich, Switzerland
Cory Heggestad	Derek Abbotts	Dan Balachorek	Darryl MacKenzie		Barrie, Ontario
Brad Heidt	Mitch Heidt	Josh Heidt	Regis Neumeier		Kindersley, Saskatchewan
Guy Hemmings	François Gagné	Benoit Vezeau	Christian Bouchard		Mount Royal, Quebec
Mark Herbert	Rob Auckland	Matt Froehlich	Travis Gansauge		Moose Jaw, Saskatchewan
Pascal Hess	Yves Hess	Florian Meister	Stefan Meienberg		Switzerland
Brent Ross (fourth)	Jake Higgs (skip)	Jonathan Beuk	Bill Buchanan		Harriston, Ontario
Glenn Howard	Wayne Middaugh	Brent Laing	Craig Savill		Coldwater, Ontario
Josh Hozack	Corey Chester	Nolan Reid	Zac Capron		Victoria, British Columbia
Colin Hufman	Joel Larway	Steve Birklid	Kevin Johnson		(Washington (state)) Seattle, Washington
Tom Hyde	Neil Jordan	Ray Faith	Cam Scott		Portage la Prairie, Manitoba
Brad Jacobs	E. J. Harnden	Ryan Harnden	Scott Seabrook		Sault Ste. Marie, Ontario
Matt Seabrook (fourth)	Mike Jakubo (skip)	Sandy MacEwan	Lee Toner		Sudbury, Ontario
Willie Jeffries	Spencer Cooper	Brian Vance	Mark Rodgers		Ottawa, Ontario
Mike Johnson	Chris Baier	Jay Wakefield	John Cullen		New Westminster, British Columbia
Wes Johnson	Brady Clark	Darren Lehto	Steve Lundeen		(Washington (state)) Seattle, Washington
Josh Johnston	Brian Chick	Ian Parker	Ryan Parker		Toronto, Ontario
Jamey Jordison	Drew Wilby	Andrew Edgar	Ryan Kun		Regina, Saskatchewan
Ian Journeaux	Dave Carison	Tim Funk	Ken Spatola		Poynette, Wisconsin
Shawn Joyce	Gary Scheirich	Dustin Phillips	Jeremy Tipper		Saskatoon, Saskatchewan
Doug Kauffman	Greg Romaniuk	Ken Trask	Brad Kasper		(Washington (state)) Seattle, Washington
Aku Kauste	Jani Sullanmaa	Pauli Jäämies	Janne Pirko	Leo Mäkelä	Finland
Mark Kean	Andrew Clayton	Patrick Janssen	Tim March		Toronto, Ontario
Bryan Kedziora	Ron Leech	Mike Goerz	Dwayne Uyede		Maple Ridge, British Columbia
Glen Kennedy	Dustin Eckstrand	Steve Meadows	Kris Meadows		Edmonton, Alberta
Kalle Kiiskinen	Perttu Piilo	Juha Pekaristo	Paavo Kuosmanen		Finland
Kim Chang-Min	Kim Min-Chan	Seong Se Hyeon	Seon Se-Young		Uiseong, Gyeongbuk, South Korea
Aleksandr Kirikov	Artem Shmakov	Anton Kalalb	Artur Razhabov	Petr Dron	Russia
Warren Hassall (fourth)	Jamie King (skip)	Todd Brick	Sean Morris		Edmonton/Calgary, Alberta
Adam Kitchens	Brandon Myhre	Alex Kitchens	Nathan Myhre		Devils Lake, North Dakota
Tyler Klymchuk	Dylan Somerton	Michael Horitz	Rhys Gamache		British Columbia
James Knievel (fourth)	John Kowalchuk	Brett Knievel	Bob Knievel (skip)		(Washington (state)) Seattle, Washington
Kevin Knutson	Lyndon Knutson	Adam Knutson	Andrew Knutson		Regina, Saskatchewan
Kevin Koe	Pat Simmons	Carter Rycroft	Nolan Thiessen		Edmonton, Alberta
Colin Koivula	Eric Theriault	Justin Whitehurst	Jordan Potts		Thunder Bay, Northern Ontario
Jared Kolomaya	Neil Kitching	Kennedy Bird	Daniel Hunt		Stonewall, Manitoba
Bruce Korte	Dean Kleiter	Roger Korte	Rob Markowsky		Saskatoon, Saskatchewan
Jason Krupski	Lyle Brown	Dean Krupski	Kelly Hollinger		Whitewood, Saskatchewan
Morio Kumagawa	Duane Lindner	Daniel Dewaard	Mark Bresee		Toronto, Ontario
Andy Lang	Daniel Herberg	Markus Messenzehl	Daniel Neuner	Andreas Kempf	Füssen, Germany
Matt Lang	Colten Flasch	Tyler Hartung	Jayden Shwaga		Saskatoon, Saskatchewan
Brad Law	Scott Comfort	Dave Kidby	Jason Obst		Regina, Saskatchewan
Steve Laycock	Joel Jordison	Brennen Jones	Dallan Muyres		Saskatoon, Saskatchewan
Philippe Lemay	Mathieu Beaufort	Jean-Michel Arsenault	Erik Lachance		Trois-Rivières, Quebec
Liu Rui	Xu Xiaoming	Zang Jialiang	Ba Dexin	Chen Lu'an	Harbin, China
Rob Lobel	Steven Lobel	Steve Small	Norm McGlaughlin		Whitby, Ontario
Thomas Løvold	Thomas Due	Steffen Walstad	Sander Rølvåg		Norway
William Lyburn	James Kirkness	Alex Forrest	Tyler Forrest		Winnipeg, Manitoba
Ian MacAulay	Steve Allen	Rick Allen	Barry Conrad		Ottawa, Ontario
Steve Mackey	Ryan O'Connor	Jim Brooks	Tim Sawatzky		Calgary, Alberta
Scott Madams	Braden Zawada	Ian Fordyce	Nigel Milnes		Winnipeg, Manitoba
Scott Manners	Tyler Lang	Ryan Deis	Mike Armstrong		North Battleford, Saskatchewan
Dave Manser	Bob Coleman	Todd McCann	Mike Mulroy		Lethbridge, Alberta
Kelly Marnoch	Tyler Waterhouse	Travis Brooks	Chris Cameron		Carberry, Manitoba
Kevin Marsh	Matt Ryback	Daniel Marsh	Aaron Shutra		Regina, Saskatchewan
Kevin Martin	John Morris	Marc Kennedy	Ben Hebert		Edmonton, Alberta
Dale Matchett	Ryan Werenich	Jeff Gorda	Shawn Kaufman		Bradford, Ontario
Curtis McCannell	Don Vines	William Harding	Jason Morrow		Pilot Mound, Manitoba
Lee McCleary	James Stark	Neil Joss	Gavin Fleming		Scotland
Heath McCormick	Bill Stopera	Martin Sather	Dean Gemmell		(New York (state)) New York, New York
Jeff McCrady	Brian Lewis	Steve Doty	Graham Sinclair		Ottawa, Ontario
Mike McEwen	B. J. Neufeld	Matt Wozniak	Denni Neufeld		Winnipeg, Manitoba
Darrell McKee	Clint Dieno	Jason Jacobson	Brock Montgomery		Saskatoon, Saskatchewan
James McKenzie	Jason Barnhart	Jordan Raymond	Chad Venn		Saskatoon, Saskatchewan
Terry McNamee	Steve Irwin	Geordie Hargreaves	Travis Saban		Brandon, Manitoba
Jay McWilliam	Colin Dick	Grant Hardie	Billy Morton		Edinburgh, Scotland
Steffen Mellemseter	Markus Snøve Høiberg	Håvard Mellem	Magnus Nedregotten	Stein Mellemseter	Norway
Jean-Michel Ménard	Martin Crête	Éric Sylvain	Philippe Ménard		Gatineau/Lévis, Quebec
Sven Michel	Claudio Pätz	Sandro Trolliet	Simon Gempeler		Adelboden, Switzerland
Dean Joanisse (fourth)	Tyler Klitch	Bryan Miki (skip)	Jay Batch		New Westminster, British Columbia
Ben Mikkelsen	Gary Maunula	Taylor Kallos	Brendan Berbenuik		Thunder Bay, Ontario
Garth Mitchell	Rob Retchless	Geoffrey Johnson	Terence Yip		Grimsby, Ontario
Elvis Molinero	Stefano Castelli	Lorenzo Piatti	Marco Pascale	Roberto Costadone	Italy
Jason Montgomery	Mike Wood	Miles Craig	William Duggan		Duncan, British Columbia
Yusuke Morozumi	Tsuyoshi Yamaguchi	Tetsuro Shimizu	Kosuke Morozumi		Karuizawa, Japan
Blake Morton	Marcus Fonger	Tommy Jusczcyk	Calvin Weber		McFarland, Wisconsin
Braeden Moskowy	Kirk Muyres	D.J. Kidby	Dustin Kidby		Regina, Saskatchewan
Richard Muntain	Mike McCaughan	Justin Reischek	Keith Doherty		Pinawa, Manitoba
David Murdoch	Glen Muirhead	Ross Paterson	Richard Woods		Lockerbie, Scotland
Jamie Murphy	Jordan Pinder	Mike Bardsley	Don McDermaid		Halifax, Nova Scotia
Mark Neeleman	Mark Rurup	Erik van der Zwan	Marcel Rijkes		Zoetermeer, Netherlands
Meico Öhninger	Andri Heimann	Kevin Wunderlin	Fabian Schmid		Switzerland
Fukuhiro Ohno	Makoto Kawahira	Tomita Masashi	Inaba Tomonori		Karuizawa, Japan
Dave Pallen	Dave Ellis	Phil Rominger	Kris Krasowski		St. Catharines, Ontario
Brent Palmer	Richard Chorkawy	Gary Stanhope	Rob Gregg		Burlington, Ontario
Kevin Park	Shane Park	Aaron Sluchinski	Justin Sluchinski		Edmonton, Alberta
Matt Paul	Dan Cook	Devo Devine	Travis Thompson		Ottawa, Ontario
Trevor Perepolkin	Ryan LeDrew	Tyler Orme	Chris Anderson		Vernon, British Columbia
Claudio Pescia	Sven Iten	Reto Seiler	Rainer Kobler	Kevin Pescia	St. Gallen, Switzerland
Daley Peters (fourth)	Vic Peters (skip)	Brendan Taylor	Kyle Werenich		Winnipeg, Manitoba
Dan Petryk (fourth)	Steve Petryk (skip)	Colin Hodgson	Brad Chyz		Calgary, Alberta
Jeff Richard (fourth)	Brent Pierce (skip)	Kevin Recksiedler	Grant Dezura		New Westminster, British Columbia
Paul Pustovar	Nick Myers	Andy Jukich	Jeff Puleo		Hibbing, Minnesota
Zach Radmer	Jon Chartrand	Rich Burmeister	Glenn Allan		(Washington (state)) Seattle, Washington
Scott Ramsay	Mark Taylor	Ross McFadyen	Ken Buchanan		Winnipeg, Manitoba
Tomi Rantamäki	Jussi Uusipaavalniemi	Pekka Peura	Jermo Pollanen		Finland
Sandy Reid	Moray Combe	Neil MacArthur	David Soutar		Scotland
Kevin Yablonski (fourth)	Jon Rennie (skip)	Harrison Boss	Matthew McDonald		Calgary, Alberta
Joël Retornaz	Silvio Zanotelli	Davide Zanotelli	Mirco Ferretti		Cortina, Italy
Greg Richardson	Paul Winford	Dan Baird	Craig Simms		Ottawa, Ontario
Sebastien Robillard	Mike Merklinger	Chris Faa	Brad Blackwell	Adam McPherson	Vancouver, British Columbia
Dean Ross	Don DeLair	Chris Blackwell	Steve Jensen		Calgary, Alberta
Manuel Ruch	Jean-Nicolas Longchamp	Daniel Graf	Renato Hächler		Switzerland
Dan Ruehl	Joey Erjavec	Nick Ruehl	Noah Johnson		Plymouth, Minnesota
Robert Rumfeldt	Adam Spencer	Scott Hodgson	Greg Robinson		Guelph, Ontario
Brady Scharback	Quinn Hersikorn	Jake Hersikorn	Brady Kendel		Saskatoon, Saskatchewan
Joe Scharf	Mike McCarville	Rob Champagne	Gary Champagne		Thunder Bay, Ontario
Al Schick	William Coutts	Stuart Coutts	Dean Clark		Regina, Saskatchewan
Robert Schlender	Chris Lemishka	Darcy Hafso	Don Bartlett		Edmonton, Alberta
Christof Schwaller	Alexander Attinger	Robert Hürlimann	Felix Attinger		Switzerland
Tom Scott	Joe Roberts	Tony Wilson	Benjamin Wilson		Hibbing, Minnesota
Daniel Selke	Mat Ring	Spencer Rowe	Brandon Leippi		Regina, Saskatchewan
Graham Shaw	Brian Binnie	David Hay	Robin Niven		Scotland
Graham Shedden	Hugh Thomson	Chay Telfer	John Tait		Scotland
Randie Shen	Brendon Liu	Nicolas Hsu	Jan-Quinn Yu		Taipei City, Chinese Taipei
John Shuster	Zach Jacobson	Jared Zezel	John Landsteiner		Duluth, Minnesota
David Sik	David Marek	Karel Uher	Milan Polivka		Prague, Czech Republic
Kelly Skinner	Allan Lawn	Greg Rabe	Mike Marshall		Brandon, Manitoba
David Smith	Warwick Smith	Craig Wilson	Ross Hepburn		Perth, Scotland
Jason Smith	Jeff Isaacson	Aaron Wald	Kris Perkovich		Ft. Myers, Florida
Kent Smith	Stuart MacLean	Mark Robar	Philip Crowell		Halifax, Nova Scotia
Jiří Snítil	Martin Snítil	Jindrich Kitzberger	Marek Vydra		Prague, Czech Republic
Mel Steffin	Barry Breton	Richard Brower	Gary Smith		British Columbia
Chad Stevens	Graham Breckon	Scott Saccary	Kevin Saccary		Dartmouth/Chester, Nova Scotia
Matt Stevens	Bob Liapis	Cody Stevens	Jeff Breyen		Bemidji, Minnesota
Paul Stevenson	Ruaraidh Whyte	Lindsay Gray	Tim Stevenson		Scotland
Rasmus Stjerne	Johnny Frederiksen	Mikkel Poulsen	Troels Harry	Lars Vilandt	Hvidovre, Denmark
Peter Stolt	Jerod Roland	Brad Caldwell	Erik Ordway		St. Paul, Minnesota
Jeff Stoughton	Jon Mead	Reid Carruthers	Steve Gould		Winnipeg, Manitoba
Derek Surka	Alex Leichter	Brian Fink	Jared Wydysh		New Haven, Connecticut
Joacim Suther	Henrik Holth	Jan-Erik Hansen	Rune Leistad		Norway
Torkil Svensgaard	Kenneth Jørgensen	Martin Uhd Grønbech	Daniel Abrahamsen	Morten Berg Thomsen	Hvidovre, Denmark
Shawn Taylor	Travis Taylor	Branden Jorgenson			Brandon, Manitoba
Ken Thompson	Scott Buckley	Dave Burgess	Kevin MacLean		Kingston, Ontario
Bill Todhunter	Ryan Meyer	Nik Geller	Craig LaBrec		Appleton, Wisconsin
Greg Todoruk	Dwight Bottrell	Darcy Todoruk	Mike Csversko		Dauphin, Manitoba
Glen Toews	Nick Ogryzlo	Mike Schott	Cory Toews		Swan River, Manitoba
Alexey Tselousov	Andrey Drozdov	Alexey Stukalsky	Aleksey Kamnev		Moscow, Russia
Wayne Tuck, Jr.	Craig Kochan	Scott McDonald	Paul Moffatt		Toronto, Ontario
Jay Tuson	Ken Tucker	Glen Jackson	Colin Mantik		Victoria, British Columbia
Thomas Ulsrud	Torger Nergård	Christoffer Svae	Håvard Vad Petersson		Oslo, Norway
Markku Uusipaavalniemi	Toni Anttila	Kasper Hakunti	Joni Ikonen	Tommi Häti	Helsinki, Finland
Garret Vey	Shawn Meyer	Sheldon Obst	Derek Dejaegher		Regina, Saskatchewan
Tyler Vietanen	John Landsteiner	Matthew Collom	Robert Splinter		Duluth, Minnesota
Tom Violette	Leon Romaniuk	Paul Lyttle			(Washington (state)) Seattle, Washington
Brock Virtue	J. D. Lind	Dominic Daemen	Matthew Ng		Calgary, Alberta
Michael Johnson (fourth)	Chris Baier	Jay Wakefield (skip)	John Cullen		New Westminster, British Columbia
Dylan Webster	Parker Konschuh	Jacob Ortt	Mac Walton		Edmonton, Alberta
Bernhard Werthemann	Bastian Brun	Daniel Widmer	Roger Stucki		Switzerland
Don Westphal	Simon Dupuis	Louis Biron	Maurice Cayouette		Thurso, Quebec
Tom Wharry	Richard Faguy	Dany Beaulieu	Mike Kennedy		Montreal, Quebec
Wade White	Kevin Tym	Dan Holowaychuk	George White		Edmonton, Alberta
Jessi Wilkinson	Neal Woloschuk	Cody Bartlett	Curtis Der	Chris Evernden	Edmonton, Alberta
Jeremy Hodges (fourth)	Matt Willerton (skip)	Dalen Petersen	Nevin DeMilliano		Edmonton, Alberta
Darren Nelson (fourth)	Brad Wood (skip)	Darin Gerow	Cal Jackson		Vernon, British Columbia
Evan Workin	Braden Burckhard	Ryan Westby	Jordan Brown		Fargo, North Dakota
Dustin Kalthoff (fourth)	Randy Woytowich (skip)	Lionel Holm	Lyndon Holm		Saskatoon, Saskatchewan
Brent Yamada	Corey Sauer	Brian Fisher	Lance Yamada		Kamloops, British Columbia

== Women ==
As of January 19, 2012

Skip	Third	Second	Lead	Alternate	Locale
Jill Andrews	Holly Jones	Theresa Wood	Stephanie Schroeder		Invermere, British Columbia
LeAnne Andrews	Donna Langlands	Andrea Smith	Victoria Murphy		British Columbia
Nicole Armstrong	Alicia Barker	Jennifer Stiglitz	Ashlee Foster		Lloydminster, Alberta
Mary-Anne Arsenault	Stephanie McVicar	Kim Kelly	Jennifer Baxter		Halifax, Nova Scotia
Cathy Auld	Janet Murphy	Stephanie Gray	Melissa Foster	Mary Chilvers	Mississauga, Ontario
Nicole Backe	Rachelle Kallechy	Lindsae Page	Kelsi Jones		Vancouver, British Columbia
Marika Bakewell	Katie Pringle	Jordan Robertson	Jordan Ariss		London, Ontario
Brett Barber	Kailena Bay	Allison Cameron	Krista White		Biggar, Saskatchewan
Melanie Barbezat	Briar Hürlimann	Mara Gautschi	Janine Wyss		Basel, Switzerland
Penny Barker	Amanda Craigie	Danielle Sicinski	Tamara Haberstock		Moose Jaw, Saskatchewan
Ève Bélisle	Martine Comeau	Julie Rainville	Sasha Beauchamp		Montreal, Quebec
Cheryl Bernard	Susan O'Connor	Lori Olson-Johns	Jennifer Sadleir		Calgary, Alberta
Leslie Bishop	Stephanie LeDrew	Courtney Davies	Kate Hamer		Sarnia, Ontario
Brandee Borne	Kara Kilden	Andrea Rudulier	Jen Buettner		Saskatoon, Saskatchewan
Corrine Bourquin	Fabienne Fürbringer	Daniela Rupp	Andrea Friedli		Uitikon, Switzerland
Erika Brown	Debbie McCormick	Ann Swisshelm	Jessica Schultz		Madison, Wisconsin
Joelle Brown	Tracey Lavery	Susan Baleja	Jennifer Cawson		Winnipeg, Manitoba
Kathy Brown	Janet Langevin	Abbie Darnley	Margie Hewitt		Guelph, Ontario
Falcon Burkitt	Jesse Sanderson	Ashley Sanderson	Sydney Gustafson		British Columbia
Chrissy Cadorin	Brit O'Neill	Jenn Minchin	Jasmine Thurston		Glendale, Ontario
Jolene Campbell	Melissa Hoffman	Maegan Clark	Michelle McIvor		Humboldt, Saskatchewan
Sian Canavan	Marion Van Horne	Brittany Connell	Audree Debay		Montreal, Quebec
Chelsea Carey	Kristy McDonald	Kristen Foster	Lindsay Titheridge		Morden, Manitoba
Alexandra Carlson	Monica Walker	Kendall Moulton	Jordan Moulton		Minneapolis, Minnesota
Nadine Chyz	Rebecca Pattison	Whitney More	Kimberly Anderson		Calgary, Alberta
Cristin Clark	Emily Good	Elle LeBeau	Sharon Vukich		(Washington (state)) Seattle, Washington
Kelly Cochrane	Brenna Cochrane	Adele Campbell	Rebecca Duck		Toronto, Ontario
Michelle Corbeil	Dawn Corbeil	Krista Regnier	Alana Horn		Lloydminster, Alberta
Sarah Wark (fourth)	Michelle Allen	Roselyn Craig (skip)	Megan Reid	Denise Sellers	Duncan, British Columbia
Camille Crottaz	Andrea Marx	Bettina Marx	Eléonore Pravex		Geneva, Switzerland
Marlo Dahl	Rhonda Skillen	Oye-Sem Won	Jessica Williams	Tiffany Stubbings	Thunder Bay, Ontario
Carolyn Darbyshire	Marcy Balderston	Raylene Rocque	Karen McNamee		Calgary, Alberta
Kristine Davanger	Malin Frondell Løchen	Julie Molnar	Ingvild Skaga		Norway
Michelle DeBuck	Suzette Loeffler	Jackie Pesch			Midland, Michigan
Delia DeJong	Jessica Monk	Amy Janko	Aisha Veiner		Grande Prairie, Alberta
Deanna Doig	Colleen Ackerman	Carla Sawicki	Carla Anaka		Regina, Saskatchewan
Glenys Bakker (fourth)	Heather Jensen	Brenda Doroshuk (skip)	Carly Quigley		Calgary, Alberta
Tanilla Doyle	Lindsay Amudsen-Meyer	Janice Bailey	Christina Faulkner		Calgary, Alberta
Daniela Driendl	Martina Linder	Marika Trettin	Gesa Angrick		Germany
Madeleine Dupont	Denise Dupont	Christine Svendsen	Lina Knudsen		Denmark
Chantelle Eberle	Nancy Inglis	Debbie Lozinski	Susan Hoffart		Regina, Saskatchewan
Brigid Ellig	Heather Van Sistine	Jennifer Westhagen	Brittany Falk	Regan Mizuno	St. Paul, Minnesota
Michelle Englot	Lana Vey	Roberta Materi	Sarah Slywka		Regina, Saskatchewan
Lisa Eyamie	Maria Bushell	Jodi Marthaller	Kyla MacLachlan		Calgary, Alberta
Nathalie Falt	Maria Carlsen	Cassandra Falt	Josefin Wanglund		Sundsvall, Sweden
Lisa Farnell	Erin Morrissey	Kim Brown	Ainsley Galbraith		Chaffeys Locks, Ontario
Binia Feltscher	Marlene Albrecht	Franziska Kaufmann	Christine Urech		Switzerland
Dana Ferguson	Nikki Smith	Denise Kinghorn	Cori Morris		Calgary, Alberta
Diane Foster	Vicki Sjolie	Judy Pendergast	Cheryl Meek		Calgary, Alberta
Satsuki Fujisawa	Miyo Ichikawa	Emi Shimizu	Miyuki Satoh	Chiaki Matsumura	Karuizawa, Japan
Kerry Galusha	Sharon Cormier	Wendy Miller	Shona Barbour	Megan Cormier	Yellowknife, Northwest Territories
Jaime Gardner	Casey Wall	Laura LaBonte	Ashley Wall		Peterborough, Ontario
Diana Gaspari	Giorgia Apollonio	Veronica Gerbi	Claudia Alverá		Italy
Linn Githmark	Henriette Løvar	Ingrid Stensrud	Kristin Skaslien		Norway
Cheryl McPherson (fourth)	Catherine Kaino	Mallory Buist	Alison Goring (skip)		Toronto, Ontario
Simone Groundwater	Laura Ball	Mallory Geier	Marla Guldbranson		British Columbia
Laura Gualtiero	Veronica Zappone	Sara Levetti	Arianna Losano	Elisa Patono	Italy
Jenna Haag	Chloe Pahl	Grace Gabower	Erin Wallace		Madison, Wisconsin
Rebecca Hamilton	Tara Peterson	Karlie Koenig	Sophie Brorson		Madison, Wisconsin
Jenn Hanna	Pascale Letendre	Stephanie Hanna	Trish Scharf		Ottawa, Ontario
Colleen Hannah	Rachelle Haider	Cynthia Parton	Nicole Montgomery		Maple Ridge, British Columbia
Jacqueline Harrison	Lori Eddy	Kimberly Tuck	Julie Columbus		Elmvale, Ontario
Janet Harvey	Cherie-Ann Loder	Kristin Loder	Carey Kirby		Winnipeg, Manitoba
Jennifer Harvey	Carol Evjimoto	Lindsay Jones	Tammy Jeffery		Ottawa, Ontario
Anna Hasselborg	Sabina Kraupp	Margaretha Dryburgh	Zandra Flyg		Sundbyberg, Sweden
Julie Hastings	Christy Trombley	Stacey Smith	Katrina Collins		Thornhill, Ontario
Amber Holland	Kim Schneider	Tammy Schneider	Heather Kalenchuk		Kronau, Saskatchewan
Rachel Homan	Emma Miskew	Alison Kreviazuk	Lisa Weagle		Ottawa, Ontario
Tracy Horgan	Jenn Seabrook	Jenna Enge	Amanda Gates		Sudbury, Ontario
Shelly Houle	Jackie Peat	Rebecca Turley	Michelle Dunn		British Columbia
Juliane Jacoby	Franziska Fischer	Josephine Obertsdorf	Martina Fink	Sibylle Maier	Germany
Michèle Jäggi	Marisa Winkelhausen	Stéphanie Jäggi	Nicole Schwälgi		Bern, Switzerland
Lisa Johnson	Michelle Ries	Natalie Holloway	Shauna Nordstrom		Edmonton, Alberta
Jennifer Jones	Kaitlyn Lawes	Jill Officer	Dawn Askin	Joëlle Sabourin	Winnipeg, Manitoba
Karlee Jones	Grace Esquega	Victoria Anderson	Kim Zsakai		Thunder Bay, Ontario
Ditte Karlsson	Mikaela Tornkvist	Frida Lideberg	Helena Svensson		Sweden
Jessie Kaufman	Nicky Kaufman	Amanda Coderre	Stephanie Enright		Edmonton, Alberta
Sanna Puustinen (fourth)	Heidi Hossi	Eszter Juhász	Oona Kauste (skip)		Finland
Kim Ji-Sun	Lee Seul-Bee	Gim Un-Chi	Lee Hyun-Jung		South Korea
Cathy King	Carolyn Morris	Doreen Gares	Lesley McEwan		Edmonton, Alberta
Shelly Kinney	Amy Lou Anderson	Elyse Sorenson	Julie Smith		St. Paul, Minnesota
Shannon Kleibrink	Amy Nixon	Bronwen Webster	Chelsey Matson		Calgary, Alberta
Linda Klímová	Lenka Černovská	Kamila Mošová	Katerina Urbanová		Czech Republic
Patti Knezevic	Brenda Garvey	Chelan Cotter	Rhonda Camozzi		Prince George, British Columbia
Anna Kubešková	Tereza Plíšková	Veronika Herdová	Eliška Jalovcová	Luisa Illková	Czech Republic
Alyssa Kyllo	Amy Edwards	Zetteh Gunner	Shayna Doll		Vernon, British Columbia
Patti Lank	Nina Spatola	Caitlin Maroldo	Mackenzie Lank		(New York (state)) Lewiston, New York
Kelley Law	Shannon Aleksic	Kirsten Fox	Dawn Suliak		New Westminster, British Columbia
Stefanie Lawton	Sherry Anderson	Sherri Singler	Marliese Kasner		Saskatoon, Saskatchewan
Brooklyn Lemon	Shelby Hubick	Kari Paulsen	Jessica Hanson		Saskatoon, Saskatchewan
Kristy Lewis	Marilou Richter	Michelle Ramsay	Sandra Comadina		Vancouver, British Columbia
Tracy Lindgren	Amy Anderson	Ann Flis	Karen Volkman		St. Paul, Minnesota
Katie Lindsay	Nicole Westlund	Lauren Wasylkiw	Stephanie Thompson		Welland, Ontario
Kim Link	Maureen Bonar	Colleen Kilgallen	Renee Fletcher	Pam Kolton	East St. Paul, Manitoba
Jackie Lockhart	Karen Kennedy	Kay Adams	Sarah Macintyre		Edinburgh, Scotland
Ineta Maca	Elēna Kāpostiņa	Rasa Lubarte	Ieva Rudzīte		Riga, Latvia
Allison MacInnes	Grace MacInnes	Diane Gushulak	Amanda Guido	Jacalyn Brown	Kamloops, British Columbia
Kelly MacIntosh	Jennifer Crouse	Julie McEvoy	Sheena Gilman		Dartmouth, Nova Scotia
Victoria Makarshina	Anna Lobova	Oksana Gertova	Nadezhda Lepezina		Russia
Isabelle Maillard	Marina Hauser	Chantal Bugnon	Michaela Kaiser	Ramona Kaiser	Switzerland
Marla Mallett	Kelly Shimizu	Danielle Callens	Barbara Zbeetnoff	Steph Jackson	New Westminster, British Columbia
Lauren Mann	Patricia Hill	Amber Moulton	Jessica Barcauskas		Ottawa, Ontario
Nancy Martin	Sharla Kruger	Terri Clark			Saskatchewan
Chana Martineau	Lesley Ewoniak	Brittany Zelmer	Marie Graham		Edmonton, Alberta
Kimberly Mastine	Nathalie Audet	Audree Dufresne	Saskia Hollands		Montreal, Quebec
Robyn Mattie	Lauren Mann	Patricia Hill	Andrea Leganchuk		Ottawa, Ontario
Krista McCarville	Ashley Miharija	Kari Lavoie	Sarah Lang		Thunder Bay, Ontario
Deb McCreanor	Ashley Meakin	Stephanie Armstrong-Craplewe	Laurie Macdonell		La Salle, Manitoba
Janet McGhee	Jennifer Spencer	Karyn Issler	Sheri Greenman	Kim Bradley	Uxbridge, Ontario
Susan McKnight	Susan Froud	Karen Rowsell	Cindy McKnight		Uxbridge, Ontario
Jonna McManus	Sara McManus	Anna Huhta	Sofia Mabergs		Gävle, Sweden
Ramona Meier	Seraina Meier	Manyola Voelkle	Carmen Spreiter	Stefanie Poli	Switzerland
Briane Meilleur	Krysten Karwacki	Amy Agnew	Meagan Grenkow		Calgary, Alberta
Marissa Messier	Cindy Wood	Jennifer Gamboa	Donna Umali-Mendoza	Katie Kerr	Hollywood, California
Sherry Middaugh	Jo-Ann Rizzo	Lee Merklinger	Leigh Armstrong		Coldwater, Ontario
Michelle Montford	Courtney Blanchard	Sara Jones	Sarah Norget		Winnipeg, Manitoba
Mari Motohashi	Megumi Mabuchi	Yumi Suzuki	Akane Eda		Kitami, Japan
Eve Muirhead	Anna Sloan	Vicki Adams	Claire Hamilton		Perth, Scotland
Morgan Muise	Lyndsay Wegmann	Sarah Horne	Michelle Collin		Calgary, Alberta
Leandra Müller	Claudia Zbinden	Rebekka Engel	Flurine Kobler	Nicole Misteli	Lucerne, Switzerland
Larissa Murray	Chelsey Peterson	Leah Mihalicz	Nicole Lang		Regina, Saskatchewan
Heather Nedohin	Beth Iskiw	Jessica Mair	Laine Peters		Edmonton, Alberta
Shelley Nichols	Michelle Jewer	Kelli Turpin	Colette Nichols		(Newfoundland and Labrador) St. John's, Newfoundland
Lene Nielsen	Helle Simonsen	Jeanne Ellegaard	Maria Poulsen		Denmark
Anette Norberg	Cecilia Östlund	Sara Carlsson	Liselotta Lennartsson		Härnösand, Sweden
Tiffany Odegard	Andrea McCutcheon	Jennifer Van Wieren	Heather Kushnir		Edmonton, Alberta
Ayumi Ogasawara	Yumie Funayama	Kaho Onodera	Chinami Yoshida	Michiko Tomabechi	Sapporo, Japan
Sherrilee Orsted	Candace Newkirk	Stephanie Barnstable	Kristen Schlamp		Saskatchewan
Chantal Osborne	Joëlle Sabourin	Catherine Derick	Sylvie Daniel		Thurso, Quebec
Oihane Otaegi	Leire Otaegi	Aitana Saenz	Iera Irazusta		Spain
Mirjam Ott	Carmen Schäfer	Carmen Küng	Janine Greiner		Davos, Switzerland
Cathy Overton-Clapham	Jenna Loder	Ashley Howard	Breanne Meakin	Leslie Wilson	Winnipeg, Manitoba
Desirée Owen	Cary-Anne Sallows	Lindsay Makichuk	Stephanie Malekoff		Grande Prairie, Alberta
Alina Pätz	Claudia Hug	Nicole Dünki	Fabiola Duss		Basel, Switzerland
Trish Paulsen	Kari Kennedy	Sarah Collin	Tessa Ruetz		Saskatoon, Saskatchewan
Jocelyn Peterman	Brittany Tran	Megan Anderson	Jamie Forth		Calgary, Alberta
Sheri Pickering	Cheyanne Creasser	Karen Schiml	Donna Phillips		Calgary, Alberta
Cassandra Potter	Jamie Haskell	Jackie Lemke	Steph Sambor	Laura Roessler	St. Paul, Minnesota
Allison Pottinger	Nicole Joraanstad	Natalie Nicholson	Tabitha Peterson		St. Paul, Minnesota
Vanessa Pouliot	Melissa Pierce	Megan Anderson	Jamie Forth		Edmonton, Alberta
Stephanie Prinse	Dana Page	Ali Renwick	Amanda Tipper		British Columbia
Liudmila Privivkova	Anna Sidorova	Nkeiruka Ezekh	Ekaterina Galkina		Moscow, Russia
Julie Reddick	Carrie Lindner	Megan Balsdon	Laura Hickey		Toronto, Ontario
Sarah Reid	Rachael Simms	Lorna Vevers	Barbara McFarlane		Glasgow, Scotland
Darcy Robertson	Calleen Neufeld	Vanessa Foster	Michelle Kruk		Winnipeg, Manitoba
Sylvie Robichaud	Danielle Nicholson	Marie Richard	Kendra Lister	Denise Nowlan	Moncton, New Brunswick
Marianne Rørvik	Anneline Skårsmoen	Kjersti Husby	Camila Holth		Norway
Allison Ross	Kristen Richards	Alanna Routledge	Brittany O'Rourke		Montreal, Quebec
Karen Rosser	Cheryl Reed	Stacey Fordyce	Brenna Philp	Andrea Tirschmann	Dugald, Manitoba
Kristen Fewster (fourth)	Jen Rusnell (skip)	Blaine Richards	Amber Cheveldave		Prince George, British Columbia
Kristy Russell	Michelle Gray	Tina Mazerolle	Joanne Curtis		Shelburne, Ontario
Tracy Samaan	Tanya Rodrigues	Lynsey Longfield	Ailsa Leitch		Ottawa, Ontario
Casey Scheidegger	Kalynn Park	Jessie Scheidegger	Joelle Horn		Lethbridge, Alberta
Lorraine Schneider	Tessa Vibe	Callan Hamon	Ashley Desjardins		Saskatchewan
Andrea Schöpp	Imogen Oona Lehmann	Corinna Scholz	Stella Heiß		Füssen, Germany
Kelly Scott	Dailene Sivertson	Sasha Carter	Jacquie Armstrong	Jeanna Schraeder	Kelowna, British Columbia
Desirée Schmidt	Brittany Palmer	Heather Nichol	Courtney Schmidt		Trail, British Columbia
Penny Shantz	Debbie Jones-Walker	Deb Pulak	Shirley Wong		Vancouver, British Columbia
Jill Shumay	Kara Johnston	Taryn Holtby	Jinaye Ayrey		Saskatoon, Saskatchewan
Manuela Siegrist	Alina Pätz	Claudia Hug	Nicole Dunki		Basel, Switzerland
Margaretha Sigfridsson	Christina Bertrup	Maria Wennerström	Maria Prytz		Umeå, Sweden
Robyn Silvernagle	Kelsey Dutton	Dayna Demmans	Cristina Goertzen		Meadow Lake, Saskatchewan
Jamie Sinclair	Holly Donaldson	Chantal Allan	Casandra Raganold		Manotick, Ontario
Heather Smith-Dacey	Danielle Parsons	Blisse Comstock	Teri Lake		Halifax, Nova Scotia
Michele Smith (fourth)	Heather Armstrong	Shana Snell (skip)	Alanna Blackwell		Calgary, Alberta
Miranda Solem	Mackenzie Lank	Julie Lilla	Chelsea Solem		Grand Rapids, Minnesota
Renée Sonnenberg	Lawnie MacDonald	Kristie Moore	Rona Pasika		Grande Prairie, Alberta
Aileen Sormunen	Courtney George	Amanda McLean	Miranda Solem		Duluth, Minnesota
Barb Spencer	Karen Klein	Ainsley Champagne	Raunora Westcott		Winnipeg, Manitoba
Paulina Stein	Towe Lundman	Elina Backman	Amalia Rudstrom		Uppsala, Sweden
Tiffany Steuber	Lisa Miller	Jenilee Goertzen	Cindy Westgard		Edmonton, Alberta
Maureen Stolt	Megan Pond	Emilia Juocys	Sherri Schummer		St. Paul, Minnesota
Karallee Swabb	Suzie Kennedy	Jackie Iskiw	Melanie Swabb		Edmonton, Alberta
Valerie Sweeting	Leslie Rogers	Joanne Taylor	Rachelle Pidherny		Edmonton, Alberta
Ildikó Szekeres	Alexandra Béres	Boglárka Ádám	Blanka Pathy-Dencsö		Hungary
Karla Thompson	Roberta Kuhn	Christen Crossley	Kristen Gentile		Kamloops, British Columbia
Jill Thurston	Kerri Einarson	Kendra Georges	Sarah Wazney		Winnipeg, Manitoba
Brandi Tinkler	Marilou Richter	Michelle Ramsay			Victoria, British Columbia
Silvana Tirinzoni	Irene Schori	Esther Neuenschwander	Sandra Gantenbein		Switzerland
Karina Toth	Constanze Hummelt	Andrea Höfler	Tina Sauerstein		Austria
Pia Trulsen	Nora Hilding	Marie Odnes	Stine Haalien		Norway
Terry Ursel	Wanda Rainka	Kendell Kohinski	Brenda Walker		Plumas, Manitoba
Kesa Van Osch	Kalia Van Osch	Brooklyn Leitch	Marika Van Osch		Victoria, British Columbia
Ellen Vogt	Riikka Louhivuori	Tiina Suuripää	Maija Salmiovirta		Finland
Alexandra Carlston (fourth)	Monica Walker (skip)	Kendall Moulton	Jordan Moulton		St. Paul, Minnesota
Wang Bingyu	Liu Yin	Yue Qingshuang	Zhou Yan		Harbin, China
Kirsten Wall	Hollie Nicol	Danielle Inglis	Jill Mouzar		Toronto, Ontario
Ashley Waye	Amberle Bocsy	Marnie Loeb	Lauren Wood		Toronto, Ontario
Crystal Webster	Erin Carmody	Geri-Lynn Ramsay	Samantha Preston		Calgary, Alberta
Melanie Wild	Regina Rohner	Laura Wunderlin	Gabriela Welti		Lucerne, Switzerland
Alex Williamson	Ashley Williamson	Rae Ann Williamson	Morgan Burns		Saskatchewan
Holly Whyte	Heather Steele	Deanne Nichol	Carmen Barrack		Edmonton, Alberta
Samantha Yachiw	Tracy Streifel	Sharla Kruger	Chelsey Strifel		Saskatoon, Saskatchewan
Nola Zingel	Heather Kuntz	Jill Watson	Melissa Martens		Lloydminster, Alberta
Olga Zharkova	Julia Portunova	Alisa Tregub	Julia Guzieva		Russia
Olga Zyablikova	Ekaterina Antonova	Victorya Moiseeva	Galina Arsenkina		Moscow, Russia
