= Greengate =

Greengate is the name of several places in the United Kingdom:

- Greengate, Greater Manchester
- Greengate, London
- Greengate, Salford

== Other ==
- Greengate Centre
- Greengate Power Corporation
- Greengate House (in Greengate, East London)
- Greengate, Whitby, a historic building in North Yorkshire
- List of United Kingdom locations: Gree-Gz
- SS Greengate, a Singaporean steamship

== See also ==
- Greengates
