= Hans-Christoph Daase =

German curler

- Curler ♂
- Other names: Christoph Daase
- Born: June 26, 1983 (age 43)

Team
- Curling club: CC Hamburg, Hamburg

Curling career
- Member Association: Germany
- World Championship: 1 (2012)
- Other appearances: European Junior Challenge: 1 (2006)
Medal record
Curling
European Junior Challenge
Bronze medal – third place	2006 Prague

Hans-Christoph Daase (born July 9, 1983; also known as Christoph Daase) is a German curler.

== Teams ==
Season	Skip	Third	Second	Lead	Alternate	Coach	Events
2005–06	Severin Walter	Manuel Walter	Patrick Benz	Hans-Christoph Daase	Malte Zeller	Katja Weisser	EJCC 2006 (bronze)
2007–08	Christopher Bartsch	Roger Schmidt	Peter Rickmers	Christoph Daase			
2008–09	Christopher Bartsch	Sven Goldemann	Peter Rickmers	Christoph Daase			
2011–12	Felix Schulze (fourth)	John Jahr (skip)	Peter Rickmers	Sven Goldemann	Hans-Christoph Daase	Martin Beiser	WCC 2012 (11th)
