= Peter Rickmers =

Peter Rickmers was the name of a number of ships operated by Rickmers Line.

- Peter Rickmers (barque), built in 1867, sold in 1884 to Finland
- Peter Rickmers (ship), built in 1889, ran aground in 1908
- SS Peter Rickmers (1913), scuttled in 1914 as a blockship
- SS Peter Rickmers (1944), captured incomplete in 1945, completed as Empire Colne
- MV Peter Rickmers, scrapped in 1986

== See also ==
- Peter Rickmers (curler) (born 1979), German curler
