= 2012 World Men's Curling Championship =

- Host city: Basel, Switzerland
- Arena: St. Jakobshalle
- Dates: March 31 – April 8, 2012
- Winner: Canada
- Curling club: Coldwater & District CC; Coldwater, Ontario
- Skip: Glenn Howard
- Third: Wayne Middaugh
- Second: Brent Laing
- Lead: Craig Savill
- Alternate: Scott Howard
- Coach: Scott Taylor
- Finalist: Scotland (Tom Brewster)

The 2012 World Men's Curling Championship was held from March 31 to April 8, 2012 at St. Jakobshalle in Basel, Switzerland. The 2012 World Men's Championship was one of the curling events that is a qualifier for the curling tournament at the 2014 Winter Olympics.

In the final, Canada's Glenn Howard defeated Scotland's Tom Brewster after making a draw to score the winning point, wrapping up the game with a score of 8–7. Canada won its third consecutive gold medal and thirty-fourth overall gold medal. Howard won his fourth gold medal and his second gold medal as skip, while Brewster won his second consecutive silver medal.

== Qualification ==
- Canada (defending champions)
- Switzerland (host nation)
- One team from the North American zone:
  - United States (Brazil challenge withdrawn)
- Seven teams from the 2011 European Curling Championships:
  - Denmark
  - Norway
  - Sweden
  - Czech Republic
  - Germany
  - Scotland
  - France (Winner of the World Challenge Games)
- Two teams from the 2011 Pacific-Asia Curling Championships:
  - China
  - New Zealand

== Teams ==
The teams are listed as follows:

Canada	China	Czech Republic
Coldwater & District CC, Coldwater Skip: Glenn Howard; Third: Wayne Middaugh; Second: Brent Laing; Lead: Craig Savill; Alternate: Scott Howard	Harbin CC, Harbin Skip: Liu Rui; Third: Xu Xiaoming; Second: Ba Dexin; Lead: Zang Jialiang; Alternate: Chen Lu'an	Brno CK, Brno Skip: Jiří Snítil; Third: Martin Snítil; Second: Jindřich Kitzberger; Lead: Marek Vydra; Alternate: Samuel Mokris
Denmark	France	Germany
Hvidovre CC, Hvidovre Skip: Rasmus Stjerne; Third: Johnny Frederiksen; Second: Mikkel Poulsen; Lead: Troels Harry; Alternate: Lars Vilandt	Chamonix CC, Chamonix Fourth: Tony Angiboust; Skip: Thomas Dufour; Second: Lionel Roux; Lead: Wilfrid Coulot; Alternate: Jérémy Frarier	CC Hamburg, Hamburg Fourth: Felix Schulze; Skip: John Jahr; Second: Peter Rickmers; Lead: Sven Goldemann; Alternate: Christoph Daase
Norway	New Zealand	Scotland
Snarøen CC, Oslo Skip: Thomas Ulsrud; Third: Torger Nergård; Second: Thomas Løvold***; Lead: Håvard Vad Petersson; Alternate: Christoffer Svae	Auckland CC, Auckland Skip: Peter de Boer; Third: Sean Becker; Second: Scott Becker; Lead: Kenny Thomson; Alternate: Phil Dowling	Curl Aberdeen, Aberdeen Skip: Tom Brewster; Third: Greg Drummond; Second: Scott Andrews; Lead: Michael Goodfellow; Alternate: David Edwards
Sweden	Switzerland	United States
Karlstads CK, Karlstad Skip: Sebastian Kraupp*; Third: Fredrik Lindberg; Second: Oskar Eriksson; Lead: Viktor Kjäll; Alternate: Niklas Edin	Glarus CC, Glarus Fourth: Benoît Schwarz**; Skip: Jan Hauser; Second: Marco Ramstein; Lead: Toni Müller; Alternate: Jürg Bamert	Ardsley CC, Irvington Skip: Heath McCormick; Third: Bill Stopera; Second: Martin Sather; Lead: Dean Gemmell; Alternate: Craig Brown

*Kraupp, Edin's third, filled in as skip for Edin, who is experiencing back pain from sciatica. Edin was not scheduled to be out for the whole tournament, and was able to return to skip three games.
**Schwarz, the Swiss alternate, replaced Müller at the fourth position for six games. Müller played at lead, while Bamert sat out as the alternate.
***Løvold, the Norwegian alternate, replaced Svae at the second position for six games in the round robin, while Svae sat out as the alternate. Løvold also played as second in the playoffs.

== Round-robin standings ==
Final round-robin standings

Key
Teams to playoffs
Teams to tiebreaker

Country	Skip	W	L	PF	PA	Ends Won	Ends Lost	Blank Ends	Stolen Ends	Shot %
Canada	Glenn Howard	10	1	88	58	50	45	9	9	88%
Scotland	Tom Brewster	8	3	77	59	46	44	16	10	84%
Norway	Thomas Ulsrud	8	3	71	61	47	38	19	10	83%
Sweden	Sebastian Kraupp	7	4	68	68	37	40	19	10	82%
New Zealand	Peter de Boer	7	4	67	71	44	42	16	8	79%
China	Liu Rui	6	5	73	63	46	46	15	16	84%
Denmark	Rasmus Stjerne	6	5	53	64	48	43	13	12	80%
United States	Heath McCormick	4	7	73	70	49	46	6	14	77%
Switzerland	Jan Hauser	3	8	61	73	41	46	14	6	79%
France	Thomas Dufour	3	8	63	83	45	48	14	7	79%
Germany	John Jahr	2	9	52	76	39	47	17	5	77%
Czech Republic	Jiří Snítil	2	9	61	84	43	49	15	6	78%

== Round-robin results ==
All times are listed in Central European Summer Time (UTC+2).

=== Draw 1 ===
Saturday, March 31, 2:00 pm

Sheet A	1	2	3	4	5	6	7	8	9	10	Final
United States (McCormick)	0	0	1	4	0	1	0	0	0	0	6
Germany (Jahr) 🔨	1	0	0	0	2	0	2	1	1	1	8

Sheet B	1	2	3	4	5	6	7	8	9	10	Final
New Zealand (de Boer) 🔨	0	1	0	0	1	0	1	0	0	X	3
Scotland (Brewster)	0	0	1	1	0	2	0	0	1	X	5

Sheet C	1	2	3	4	5	6	7	8	9	10	11	Final
Norway (Ulsrud)	0	0	0	0	0	1	1	0	0	1	3	6
Denmark (Stjerne) 🔨	0	0	0	0	1	0	0	2	0	0	0	3

Sheet D	1	2	3	4	5	6	7	8	9	10	Final
Canada (Howard)	0	1	0	1	1	0	3	0	0	1	7
France (Dufour) 🔨	1	0	2	0	0	1	0	0	1	0	5

=== Draw 2 ===
Saturday, March 31, 7:00 pm

Sheet A	1	2	3	4	5	6	7	8	9	10	Final
Denmark (Stjerne) 🔨	1	2	1	1	0	3	0	3	X	X	11
New Zealand (de Boer)	0	0	0	0	2	0	2	0	X	X	4

Sheet B	1	2	3	4	5	6	7	8	9	10	Final
China (Liu) 🔨	2	2	0	0	2	0	0	3	0	X	9
Czech Republic (Snítil)	0	0	1	1	0	1	1	0	1	X	5

Sheet C	1	2	3	4	5	6	7	8	9	10	Final
Switzerland (Hauser)	0	0	0	0	2	0	1	0	1	X	4
Sweden (Kraupp) 🔨	0	0	1	2	0	3	0	2	0	X	8

Sheet D	1	2	3	4	5	6	7	8	9	10	Final
Norway (Ulsrud) 🔨	0	3	0	0	1	0	0	2	0	X	6
Scotland (Brewster)	0	0	2	2	0	0	2	0	5	X	11

=== Draw 3 ===
Sunday, April 1, 9:00 am

Sheet B	1	2	3	4	5	6	7	8	9	10	Final
France (Dufour)	0	1	0	1	0	3	1	1	0	1	8
United States (McCormick) 🔨	1	0	2	0	2	0	0	0	1	0	6

Sheet C	1	2	3	4	5	6	7	8	9	10	Final
Canada (Howard) 🔨	4	0	2	2	0	1	X	X	X	X	9
Germany (Jahr)	0	1	0	0	1	0	X	X	X	X	2

=== Draw 4 ===
Sunday, April 1, 2:00 pm

Sheet A	1	2	3	4	5	6	7	8	9	10	Final
Czech Republic (Snítil)	0	0	1	0	0	1	0	1	2	X	5
Switzerland (Hauser) 🔨	0	1	0	1	0	0	1	0	0	X	3

Sheet B	1	2	3	4	5	6	7	8	9	10	Final
Scotland (Brewster)	0	1	0	2	0	1	0	2	0	1	7
Denmark (Stjerne) 🔨	3	0	2	0	2	0	1	0	1	0	9

Sheet C	1	2	3	4	5	6	7	8	9	10	Final
New Zealand (de Boer)	0	2	0	0	3	0	2	0	0	X	7
Norway (Ulsrud) 🔨	1	0	1	0	0	1	0	1	0	X	4

Sheet D	1	2	3	4	5	6	7	8	9	10	Final
China (Liu)	0	0	0	0	0	2	2	0	1	1	6
Sweden (Kraupp) 🔨	0	0	3	1	2	0	0	1	0	0	7

=== Draw 5 ===
Sunday, April 1, 7:00 pm

Sheet A	1	2	3	4	5	6	7	8	9	10	Final
Germany (Jahr)	0	0	1	0	1	0	0	0	3	0	5
France (Dufour) 🔨	0	2	0	2	0	1	0	0	0	1	6

Sheet B	1	2	3	4	5	6	7	8	9	10	Final
Switzerland (Hauser)	0	0	1	0	1	0	0	0	2	X	4
China (Liu) 🔨	0	2	0	2	0	0	1	2	0	X	7

Sheet C	1	2	3	4	5	6	7	8	9	10	Final
Sweden (Kraupp) 🔨	0	3	0	0	2	0	2	1	0	X	8
Czech Republic (Snítil)	0	0	2	0	0	2	0	0	1	X	5

Sheet D	1	2	3	4	5	6	7	8	9	10	Final
United States (McCormick) 🔨	1	0	3	0	0	1	0	1	1	0	7
Canada (Howard)	0	2	0	2	1	0	2	0	0	1	8

=== Draw 6 ===
Monday, April 2, 9:00 am

Sheet A	1	2	3	4	5	6	7	8	9	10	Final
Canada (Howard) 🔨	1	0	2	1	0	2	0	2	X	X	8
Norway (Ulsrud)	0	1	0	0	1	0	1	0	X	X	3

Sheet B	1	2	3	4	5	6	7	8	9	10	Final
France (Dufour) 🔨	0	2	0	2	0	0	0	1	0	0	5
New Zealand (de Boer)	0	0	1	0	2	0	1	0	2	0	6

Sheet C	1	2	3	4	5	6	7	8	9	10	Final
United States (McCormick) 🔨	2	0	0	1	0	0	1	0	1	2	7
Denmark (Stjerne)	0	1	0	0	3	1	0	1	0	0	6

Sheet D	1	2	3	4	5	6	7	8	9	10	Final
Germany (Jahr) 🔨	1	0	0	1	0	0	1	0	0	X	3
Scotland (Brewster)	0	2	1	0	0	3	0	1	1	X	8

=== Draw 7 ===
Monday, April 2, 2:00 pm

Sheet A	1	2	3	4	5	6	7	8	9	10	Final
New Zealand (de Boer) 🔨	0	2	0	0	1	0	0	0	0	X	3
Sweden (Kraupp)	0	0	3	1	0	0	0	2	2	X	8

Sheet B	1	2	3	4	5	6	7	8	9	10	Final
Norway (Ulsrud)	1	0	1	0	1	0	0	2	0	1	6
Czech Republic (Snítil) 🔨	0	1	0	0	0	2	0	0	1	0	4

Sheet C	1	2	3	4	5	6	7	8	9	10	Final
Scotland (Brewster) 🔨	0	0	0	2	0	0	2	0	2	1	7
Switzerland (Hauser)	0	1	0	0	2	0	0	1	0	0	4

Sheet D	1	2	3	4	5	6	7	8	9	10	Final
Denmark (Stjerne)	0	0	0	2	1	0	2	0	1	0	6
China (Liu) 🔨	1	0	1	0	0	2	0	1	0	2	7

=== Draw 8 ===
Monday, April 2, 7:00 pm

Sheet A	1	2	3	4	5	6	7	8	9	10	Final
China (Liu) 🔨	2	0	1	0	2	0	0	0	2	0	7
United States (McCormick)	0	1	0	0	0	1	1	1	0	1	5

Sheet B	1	2	3	4	5	6	7	8	9	10	Final
Switzerland (Hauser)	0	2	2	0	3	0	0	2	X	X	9
Germany (Jahr) 🔨	1	0	0	1	0	0	2	0	X	X	4

Sheet C	1	2	3	4	5	6	7	8	9	10	Final
Czech Republic (Snítil) 🔨	1	0	1	0	0	0	0	1	0	X	3
Canada (Howard)	0	3	0	2	0	0	0	0	4	X	9

Sheet D	1	2	3	4	5	6	7	8	9	10	Final
Sweden (Kraupp)	1	0	5	0	0	2	0	1	1	0	10
France (Dufour) 🔨	0	2	0	0	1	0	4	0	0	1	8

=== Draw 9 ===
Tuesday, April 3, 9:00 am

Sheet A	1	2	3	4	5	6	7	8	9	10	Final
Czech Republic (Snítil)	0	0	1	0	0	1	0	1	0	0	3
Germany (Jahr) 🔨	1	0	0	1	0	0	1	0	0	1	4

Sheet B	1	2	3	4	5	6	7	8	9	10	Final
Sweden (Kraupp)	0	0	0	0	1	0	X	X	X	X	1
United States (McCormick) 🔨	1	2	3	3	0	1	X	X	X	X	10

Sheet C	1	2	3	4	5	6	7	8	9	10	Final
China (Liu) 🔨	0	0	1	1	1	0	2	3	X	X	8
France (Dufour)	0	0	0	0	0	2	0	0	X	X	2

Sheet D	1	2	3	4	5	6	7	8	9	10	11	Final
Switzerland (Hauser)	1	0	0	2	0	1	0	1	0	1	0	6
Canada (Howard) 🔨	0	2	1	0	1	0	0	0	2	0	1	7

=== Draw 10 ===
Tuesday, April 3, 2:00 pm

Sheet A	1	2	3	4	5	6	7	8	9	10	Final
France (Dufour) 🔨	1	0	0	0	1	1	0	1	0	1	5
Scotland (Brewster)	0	1	0	1	0	0	1	0	0	0	3

Sheet B	1	2	3	4	5	6	7	8	9	10	Final
Canada (Howard)	0	3	0	0	0	2	0	0	2	1	8
Denmark (Stjerne) 🔨	2	0	1	0	1	0	0	1	0	0	5

Sheet C	1	2	3	4	5	6	7	8	9	10	Final
Germany (Jahr) 🔨	0	0	2	3	0	0	0	0	1	0	6
New Zealand (de Boer)	0	0	0	0	2	2	0	1	0	3	8

Sheet D	1	2	3	4	5	6	7	8	9	10	Final
United States (McCormick)	0	1	0	0	2	0	1	0	X	X	4
Norway (Ulsrud) 🔨	2	0	0	3	0	3	0	1	X	X	9

=== Draw 11 ===
Tuesday, April 3, 8:00 pm

Sheet A	1	2	3	4	5	6	7	8	9	10	Final
Denmark (Stjerne) 🔨	1	0	2	0	0	3	1	2	X	X	9
Switzerland (Hauser)	0	2	0	1	1	0	0	0	X	X	4

Sheet B	1	2	3	4	5	6	7	8	9	10	Final
Scotland (Brewster) 🔨	0	0	2	0	0	3	0	2	0	0	7
China (Liu)	1	0	0	2	0	0	2	0	0	1	6

Sheet C	1	2	3	4	5	6	7	8	9	10	Final
Norway (Ulsrud)	0	1	0	0	0	3	1	0	3	X	8
Sweden (Kraupp) 🔨	0	0	0	1	0	0	0	2	0	X	3

Sheet D	1	2	3	4	5	6	7	8	9	10	Final
New Zealand (de Boer) 🔨	2	0	0	1	0	0	3	0	2	X	8
Czech Republic (Snítil)	0	2	0	0	2	0	0	1	0	X	5

=== Draw 12 ===
Wednesday, April 4, 9:00 am

Sheet A	1	2	3	4	5	6	7	8	9	10	Final
Norway (Ulsrud) 🔨	1	1	0	0	0	1	0	2	1	1	7
China (Liu)	0	0	2	1	0	0	2	0	0	0	5

Sheet B	1	2	3	4	5	6	7	8	9	10	Final
New Zealand (de Boer)	0	1	0	3	1	0	3	0	1	X	9
Switzerland (Hauser) 🔨	2	0	1	0	0	1	0	2	0	X	6

Sheet C	1	2	3	4	5	6	7	8	9	10	Final
Denmark (Stjerne) 🔨	0	1	0	2	0	3	0	1	0	2	9
Czech Republic (Snítil)	1	0	2	0	1	0	2	0	2	0	8

Sheet D	1	2	3	4	5	6	7	8	9	10	Final
Scotland (Brewster)	0	0	2	0	3	1	0	1	0	X	7
Sweden (Kraupp) 🔨	0	1	0	1	0	0	1	0	1	X	4

=== Draw 13 ===
Wednesday, April 4, 2:00 pm

Sheet A	1	2	3	4	5	6	7	8	9	10	Final
Sweden (Kraupp)	0	2	0	1	0	1	0	2	0	X	6
Canada (Howard) 🔨	2	0	2	0	1	0	3	0	2	X	10

Sheet B	1	2	3	4	5	6	7	8	9	10	Final
Czech Republic (Snítil) 🔨	2	0	0	2	0	2	2	0	0	3	11
France (Dufour)	0	2	1	0	2	0	0	2	2	0	9

Sheet C	1	2	3	4	5	6	7	8	9	10	Final
Switzerland (Hauser) 🔨	2	0	0	0	0	2	1	0	2	X	7
United States (McCormick)	0	2	1	1	0	0	0	1	0	X	5

Sheet D	1	2	3	4	5	6	7	8	9	10	11	Final
China (Liu)	2	0	0	0	1	0	1	0	2	0	1	7
Germany (Jahr) 🔨	0	1	0	1	0	1	0	2	0	1	0	6

=== Draw 14 ===
Wednesday, April 4, 7:00 pm

Sheet A	1	2	3	4	5	6	7	8	9	10	Final
United States (McCormick) 🔨	0	2	0	0	4	2	0	2	X	X	10
New Zealand (de Boer)	1	0	0	2	0	0	1	0	X	X	4

Sheet B	1	2	3	4	5	6	7	8	9	10	Final
Germany (Jahr)	0	0	2	0	1	0	1	0	2	0	6
Norway (Ulsrud) 🔨	1	0	0	2	0	1	0	2	0	1	7

Sheet C	1	2	3	4	5	6	7	8	9	10	Final
Canada (Howard)	1	0	1	1	0	1	1	0	0	2	7
Scotland (Brewster) 🔨	0	2	0	0	1	0	0	2	0	0	5

Sheet D	1	2	3	4	5	6	7	8	9	10	Final
France (Dufour) 🔨	1	0	1	0	0	1	0	0	0	X	3
Denmark (Stjerne)	0	1	0	0	2	0	1	3	1	X	8

=== Draw 15 ===
Thursday, April 5, 9:00 am

Sheet A	1	2	3	4	5	6	7	8	9	10	Final
Scotland (Brewster) 🔨	0	1	2	0	1	0	2	0	2	1	9
Czech Republic (Snítil)	1	0	0	0	0	2	0	3	0	0	6

Sheet B	1	2	3	4	5	6	7	8	9	10	Final
Denmark (Stjerne) 🔨	0	0	1	0	1	0	1	0	0	0	3
Sweden (Kraupp)	0	1	0	1	0	1	0	0	2	1	6

Sheet C	1	2	3	4	5	6	7	8	9	10	Final
New Zealand (de Boer) 🔨	1	0	1	0	1	0	1	0	1	1	6
China (Liu)	0	1	0	1	0	2	0	0	0	0	4

Sheet D	1	2	3	4	5	6	7	8	9	10	Final
Norway (Ulsrud)	0	2	0	1	0	1	2	0	0	X	6
Switzerland (Hauser) 🔨	0	0	1	0	1	0	0	1	1	X	4

=== Draw 16 ===
Thursday, April 5, 2:00 pm

Sheet A	1	2	3	4	5	6	7	8	9	10	Final
Germany (Jahr) 🔨	1	0	2	0	0	0	1	0	0	X	4
Denmark (Stjerne)	0	1	0	2	1	1	0	0	1	X	6

Sheet B	1	2	3	4	5	6	7	8	9	10	Final
United States (McCormick)	0	0	0	2	1	1	0	1	0	1	6
Scotland (Brewster) 🔨	2	1	2	0	0	0	1	0	2	0	8

Sheet C	1	2	3	4	5	6	7	8	9	10	11	Final
France (Dufour)	0	2	0	1	1	0	1	0	0	1	0	6
Norway (Ulsrud) 🔨	1	0	2	0	0	1	0	2	0	0	3	9

Sheet D	1	2	3	4	5	6	7	8	9	10	11	Final
Canada (Howard)	0	1	0	2	0	0	0	2	0	2	0	7
New Zealand (de Boer) 🔨	1	0	1	0	2	1	1	0	1	0	2	9

=== Draw 17 ===
Thursday, April 5, 7:00 pm

Sheet A	1	2	3	4	5	6	7	8	9	10	Final
Switzerland (Hauser)	0	0	4	0	2	0	2	0	2	X	10
France (Dufour) 🔨	1	1	0	1	0	1	0	2	0	X	6

Sheet B	1	2	3	4	5	6	7	8	9	10	Final
China (Liu)	0	1	0	1	0	0	1	0	2	2	7
Canada (Howard) 🔨	2	0	3	0	0	2	0	1	0	0	8

Sheet C	1	2	3	4	5	6	7	8	9	10	Final
Sweden (Kraupp) 🔨	2	0	0	0	1	0	0	2	0	2	7
Germany (Jahr)	0	0	0	1	0	0	2	0	1	0	4

Sheet D	1	2	3	4	5	6	7	8	9	10	Final
Czech Republic (Snítil)	0	2	0	0	1	0	1	0	2	0	6
United States (McCormick) 🔨	1	0	1	1	0	2	0	1	0	1	7

== Tiebreaker ==
Friday, April 6, 2:00 pm

Team	1	2	3	4	5	6	7	8	9	10	Final
Sweden (Kraupp) 🔨	2	1	0	2	0	0	5	X	X	X	10
New Zealand (de Boer)	0	0	0	0	2	0	0	X	X	X	2

Player percentages
Sweden		New Zealand	
Viktor Kjäll	96%	Kenny Thomson	61%
Oskar Eriksson	79%	Scott Becker	84%
Fredrik Lindberg	73%	Sean Becker	75%
Sebastian Kraupp	79%	Peter de Boer	55%
Total	81%	Total	69%

== Playoffs ==
Page playoff system
1	Canada	7
2	Scotland	6
3	Norway	6
4	Sweden	8

Semifinal
2	Scotland	7
4	Sweden	6

Gold medal game
1	Canada	8
2	Scotland	7

Bronze medal game
4	Sweden	9
3	Norway	8

=== 1 vs. 2 ===
Saturday, April 7, 2:00 pm

Team	1	2	3	4	5	6	7	8	9	10	11	Final
Canada (Howard) 🔨	0	0	1	0	0	1	0	4	0	0	1	7
Scotland (Brewster)	0	0	0	1	1	0	1	0	2	1	0	6

Player percentages
Canada		Scotland	
Craig Savill	83%	Michael Goodfellow	80%
Brent Laing	80%	Scott Andrews	77%
Wayne Middaugh	83%	Greg Drummond	82%
Glenn Howard	85%	Tom Brewster	80%
Total	83%	Total	80%

=== 3 vs. 4 ===
Saturday, April 7, 9:00 am

Sheet B	1	2	3	4	5	6	7	8	9	10	Final
Norway (Ulsrud) 🔨	1	0	0	0	1	1	0	2	0	1	6
Sweden (Kraupp)	0	1	2	2	0	0	2	0	1	0	8

Player percentages
Norway		Sweden	
Håvard Vad Petersson	96%	Viktor Kjäll	93%
Thomas Løvold	95%	Oskar Eriksson	100%
Torger Nergård	88%	Fredrik Lindberg	83%
Thomas Ulsrud	71%	Sebastian Kraupp	86%
Total	88%	Total	90%

=== Semifinal ===
Saturday, April 7, 8:00 pm

Sheet B	1	2	3	4	5	6	7	8	9	10	Final
Scotland (Brewster) 🔨	1	0	1	0	3	0	0	2	0	0	7
Sweden (Kraupp)	0	1	0	1	0	1	1	0	1	1	6

Player percentages
Scotland		Sweden	
Michael Goodfellow	81%	Viktor Kjäll	93%
Scott Andrews	80%	Oskar Eriksson	81%
Greg Drummond	96%	Fredrik Lindberg	55%
Tom Brewster	80%	Sebastian Kraupp	64%
Total	84%	Total	73%

=== Bronze medal game ===
Sunday, April 8, 11:00 am

Sheet B	1	2	3	4	5	6	7	8	9	10	11	Final
Sweden (Kraupp) 🔨	2	0	0	2	0	3	0	0	1	0	1	9
Norway (Ulsrud)	0	0	1	0	2	0	2	1	0	2	0	8

Player percentages
Sweden		Norway	
Viktor Kjäll	90%	Håvard Vad Petersson	78%
Oskar Eriksson	90%	Thomas Løvold	91%
Fredrik Lindberg	91%	Torger Nergård	85%
Sebastian Kraupp	83%	Thomas Ulsrud	76%
Total	88%	Total	83%

=== Gold medal game ===
Sunday, April 8, 4:00 pm

Sheet B	1	2	3	4	5	6	7	8	9	10	11	Final
Canada (Howard) 🔨	0	0	3	0	1	0	2	0	1	0	1	8
Scotland (Brewster)	1	0	0	2	0	1	0	2	0	1	0	7

Player percentages
Canada		Scotland	
Craig Savill	90%	Michael Goodfellow	89%
Brent Laing	76%	Scott Andrews	81%
Wayne Middaugh	85%	Greg Drummond	84%
Glenn Howard	81%	Tom Brewster	89%
Total	83%	Total	86%

== Player percentages ==
The top five player percentages of the round robin are as follows:

Leads	%
(Canada) Craig Savill	93
(China) Zang Jialiang	89
(Sweden) Viktor Kjäll	88
(Scotland) Michael Goodfellow	87
(Germany) Sven Goldemann	87

Seconds	%
(China) Ba Dexin	86
(Canada) Brent Laing	85
(Sweden) Oskar Eriksson	84
(Scotland) Scott Andrews	83
(Denmark) Mikkel Poulsen	82

Thirds	%
(Canada) Wayne Middaugh	90
(Norway) Torger Nergård	85
(Scotland) Greg Drummond	83
(Sweden) Fredrik Lindberg	82
(China) Xu Xiaoming	81

Skips	%
(Canada) Glenn Howard	84
(Scotland) Tom Brewster	82
(Norway) Thomas Ulsrud	80
(Denmark) Rasmus Stjerne	80
(Sweden) Sebastian Kraupp	79
