= Bamert =

Bamert is a surname. Notable people with the surname include:

- Jan Bamert (born 1998), Swiss footballer
- Jürg Bamert (born 1982), Swiss curler
- Matthias Bamert (born 1942), Swiss composer and conductor
- Maya Bamert (born 1979), Swiss bobsledder
