= Ever Glory =

Ever Glory may refer to

- Ever Glory Publishing, a Taiwanese publisher
- SS Ever Glory, a Singaporean steamship
