= Greengate Power Corporation =

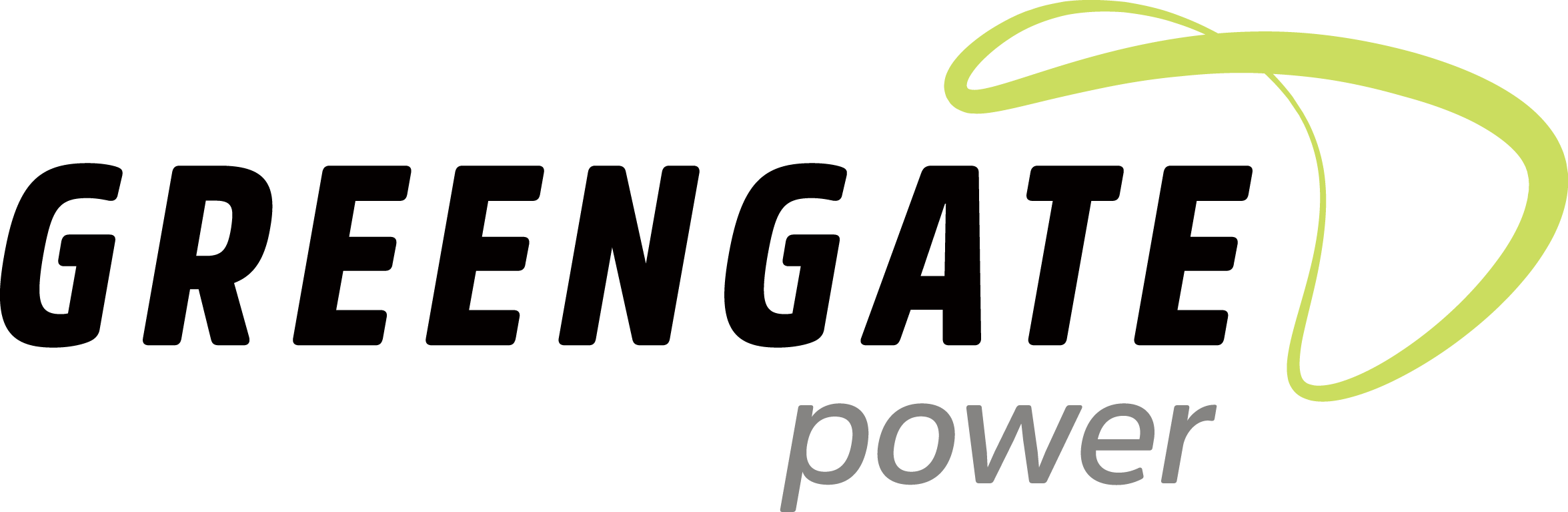
- Company type: Private company
- Industry: Utilities
- Headquarters: Calgary, Alberta, Canada
- Key people: Dan Balaban (president & CEO)
- Website: greengatepower.com

Greengate Power Corporation (Greengate) is a Canadian energy company focused on renewable energy in Alberta.

== Summary of activity in the 2010s ==
Greengate's first project, the 150 megawatt (MW) Halkirk I Wind Project, was completed in 2012. It was central Alberta's first wind project, first wind project approved by the Alberta Utilities Commission (AUC) and, at the time of construction, the province's largest wind project, located in the County of Paintearth, 40 kilometres (25 mi) east of Stettler. The project was sold to its joint venture partner Capital Power corporation.

Greengate's second project was the Blackspring Ridge I Wind Project, with a total generating capacity of 300 MW. Upon completion in 2013, BSR was the largest wind farm in Canada. Greengate sold it to EDF EN Canada and Enbridge.

== Summary of activity in the 2020s ==
On 18 April 2023, Potentia Renewables Inc. and Greengate Power Corporation announced the closing of financing for the Paintearth Wind Project, located in Alberta. This project is owned by Potentia (75 percent) and Greengate (25 percent).
