= Greengate, London =

Area of Plaistow in east London, England

Coordinates: 51.528°N 0.027°E

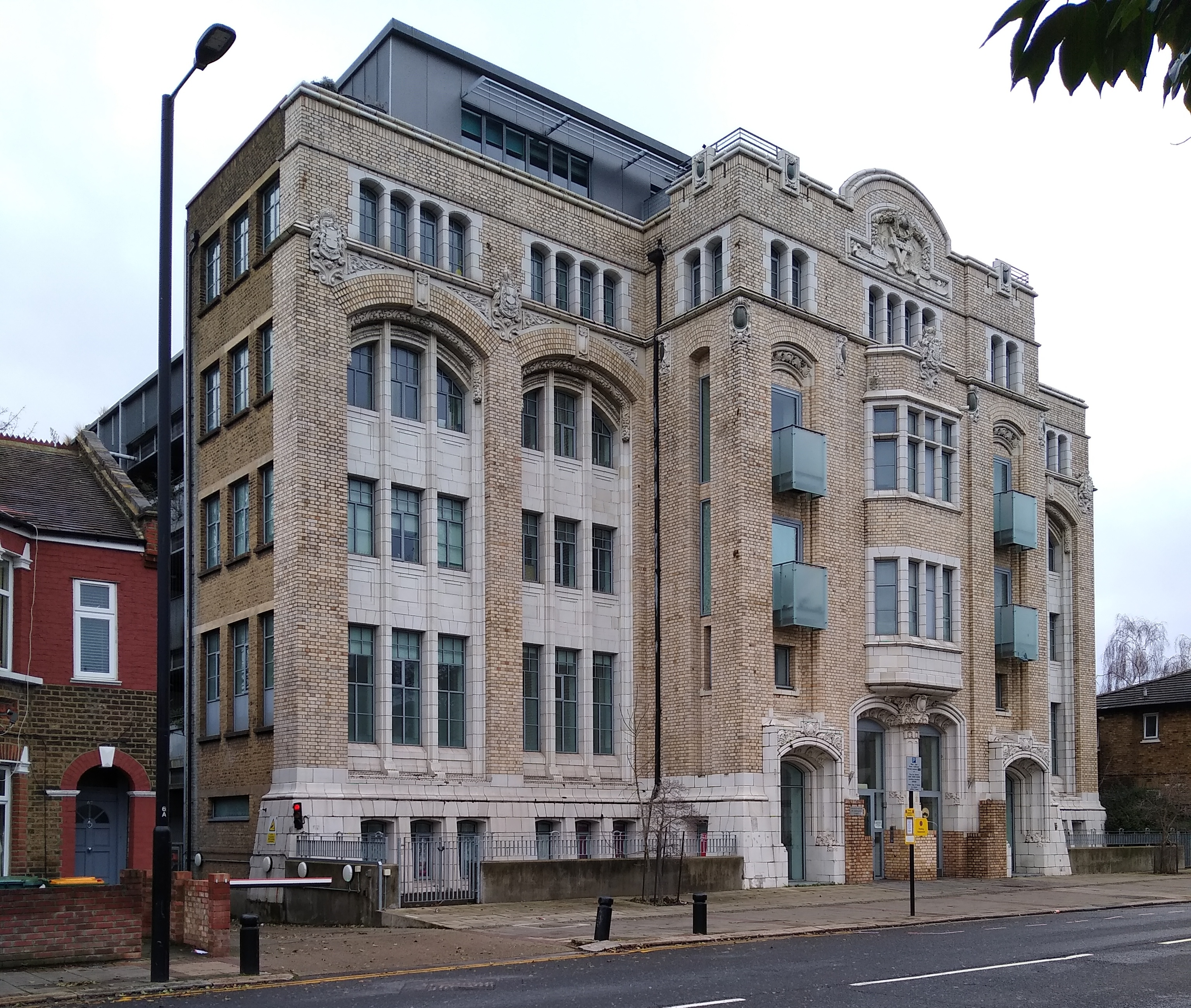
Greengate House

Greengate is a neighbourhood located in Plaistow, in East London within the London Borough of Newham. A notable feature of the area is the Greengate House, previously the home to a YMCA and an Art college. The Barking Road runs nearby.

Historically, Greengate was in the ancient parish of West Ham, within the hundred of Becontree, and part of the historic county of Essex.
