= Jürg Bamert =

Swiss curler (born 1982)

- Curler ♂
- Born: 10 September 1982 (age 44)

Team
- Curling club: CC Glarus, Bern

Curling career
- Member Association: Switzerland
- World Championship: 1 (2012)
Medal record
Curling
Swiss Men's Championship
| Gold medal – first place | 2012 Gstaad |
| Silver medal – second place | 2011 Gstaad |

Jürg Bamert (born 10 September 1982) is a Swiss curler.

At the national level, he is a 2012 Swiss men's champion curler.

== Teams ==
| Season | Skip | Third | Second | Lead | Alternate | Coach | Events |
|---|---|---|---|---|---|---|---|
| 2003–04 | Markus Hauser | Jan Hauser | Jürg Bamert | Florian Grunenfelder | Martin Rios | | |
| 2004–05 | Markus Hauser | Jürg Bamert | Jurg Hingher | Florian Grunenfelder | | | |
| 2007–08 | Urs Beglinger | Andi Hingher | Martin Rios | Jürg Bamert | Kevin Spychiger | | |
| 2009–10 | Patrick Vuille | Gilles Vuille | Martin Rios | Jürg Bamert | | | |
| 2010–11 | Patrick Vuille | Gilles Vuille | Martin Rios | Jürg Bamert | Andreas Hingher, Roger Hämmerli | Rolf Hösli, Robert Buchli | SMCC 2011 (silver) |
| 2011–12 | Toni Müller (fourth) | Jan Hauser (skip) | Marco Ramstein | Jürg Bamert | Markus Eggler, Damian Grichting | Markus Eggler | SMCC 2012 (gold) |
| 2011–12 | Toni Müller (fourth) | Jan Hauser (skip) | Marco Ramstein | Jürg Bamert | Benoît Schwarz | Andreas Schwaller | WCC 2012 (9th) |
