= Morten Berg Thomsen =

Danish male curler

- Curler ♂
- Born: 14 September 1984 (age 42); Esbjerg, Denmark

Team
- Curling club: Hvidovre CC, Hvidovre

Curling career
- Member Association: Denmark
- Olympic: 1 (2018)
Medal record
Curling
Danish Men's Championship
| Silver medal – second place | 2013 |

Morten Berg Thomsen (born 14 September 1984 in Esbjerg, Denmark) is a Danish curler.

He participated at the 2018 Winter Olympics where the Danish men's team finished in tenth place.

== Teams ==
| Season | Skip | Third | Second | Lead | Alternate | Coach | Events |
|---|---|---|---|---|---|---|---|
| 2007–08 | Carsten Svensgaard | Kenneth Jørgensen | Mikkel Poulsen | Morten Berg Thomsen | | | |
| 2012–13 | Torkil Svensgaard | Martin Uhd Gronbech | Morten Berg Thomsen | Daniel Dalgaard Abrahamsen | | | DMCC 2013 (silver) |
| 2013–14 | Torkil Svensgaard | Martin Uhd Gronbech | Daniel Dalgaard Abrahamsen | Morten Berg Thomsen | | | |
| 2013–14 | Torkil Svensgaard | Martin Uhd Gronbech | Morten Berg Thomsen | Joel Ostrowski | | | DMCC 2014 (4th) |
| 2017–18 | Rasmus Stjerne | Johnny Frederiksen | Mikkel Poulsen | Oliver Dupont | Morten Berg Thomsen | Mikael Qvist | WOG 2018 (10th) |
