= SS Katong =

Cargo ship

History
- Name: Peter Rickmers (1944-45); Empire Colne (1945-47); Katong (1947-71); Greengate (1971-72); Ever Glory (1972-74)
- Owner: Rickmers Line (1944-45); Ministry of War Transport (1945-47); Straits Steamship Co Ltd (1947-71); Greenland Ocean Lines Ltd (1971-72); Lam Kok Shipping Co (1972-74)
- Operator: Rickmers Line (1944-45); Indo-China Steam Navigation Co Ltd (1945-47); Straits Steamship Co Ltd (1947-71); Greenland Ocean Lines Ltd (1971-72); Lam Kok Shipping Co (1972-74)
- Port of registry: (Nazi Germany) Hamburg (1944-45); (United Kingdom) London (1945-47); Singapore (1947-66); Singapore (1966-74)
- Builder: Lübecker Maschinenbau-Gesellschaft
- Launched: 1944
- Completed: 1945
- Identification: Code Letters GDPX (1945-47); United Kingdom Official Number 180845 (1945-47)
- Fate: Scrapped

General characteristics
- Type: Cargo ship
- Tonnage: 1,923 GRT; 935 NRT
- Length: 281 ft 8 in (85.85 m)
- Beam: 44 ft 4 in (13.51 m)
- Depth: 15 ft 9 in (4.80 m)
- Installed power: Steam engine
- Propulsion: Screw propeller

Katong was a 1,923 GRT cargo ship which was built in 1944 by Lübecker Maschinenbau-Gesellschaft, Lübeck, Germany as Peter Rickmers for Rickmers Line. She was seized as a war prize at Stettin in May 1945 and passed to the Ministry of War Transport (MoWT) as an Empire ship and renamed Empire Colne. In 1947 she was sold to Singapore and renamed Katong. She was sold in 1971 and renamed Greengate. In 1972 she was sold and renamed Ever Glory. She was scrapped in 1974.

== Description ==
The ship was built by Lübecker Maschinenbau-Gesellschaft and was launched in 1944.

The ship was 281 feet 8 inches (85.85 m) long, with a beam of 44 feet 4 inches (13.51 m) and a depth of 15 feet 9 inches (4.80 m). She had a GRT of 1,923 and a NRT of 935.

The ship was propelled by a steam engine.

== History ==
Peter Rickmers was built for Rickmers Line. In 1945, she was seized in an incomplete state at Stettin. Declared a war prize, she was completed at Lübeck as Empire Colne. Her port of registry was London. The United Kingdom Official Number 180845 and Code Letters GDPX were allocated. She was operated under the management of Indo-China Steam Navigation Co Ltd.

In 1947, she was sold to the Straits Steamship Co Ltd, Singapore and was renamed Katong. She served until 1971 when she was sold to Greenland Ocean Lines Ltd, Singapore and was renamed Greengate. In 1972, she was sold to Lam Kok Shipping Co, Singapore and was renamed Ever Glory. She was scrapped in June 1974 in China.
