= Sven Goldemann =

German curler and Olympian

- Curler
- Born: 22 June 1969 (age 57); Hamburg, Germany

Team
- Curling club: CC Hamburg

Curling career
- Member Association: Germany
- World Championship: 3 (1996, 2012, 2014)
- World Mixed Championship: 2 (2023, 2024)
- European Championship: 2 (2011, 2013)
- Olympic: 1 (2014)

Sven Goldemann (born 22 June 1969 in Hamburg) is a German curler. He started curling in 1980. At the 2013 Olympic Qualifying Event Goldemann played lead for the John Jahr skipped German men's team. The team finished the round robin in first place with a record of 5-2 and ultimately defeated the team from the Czech Republic to win the event. Goldemann's team went on to represent Germany in the 2014 Winter Olympics, where they finished tenth with a record of 1–8.
