= Peter Rickmers (curler) =

German curler (born 1979)

Personal information
- Nationality: German
- Born: 12 November 1979 (age 46) Hamburg

Sport
- Sport: Curling

Peter Rickmers (born 12 November 1979) is a German curler. He was born in Hamburg, and is educated as aerospace engineer. He competed at the 2011 European Curling Championships in Moscow, the 2012 World Curling Championships in Basel, the 2013 European Curling Championships in Stavanger, and at the 2014 Winter Olympics in Sochi.
