= Felix Schulze =

German curler

Personal information
- Nationality: German
- Born: 21 October 1980 (age 44); Hamburg

Sport
- Sport: Curling

Felix Schulze (born 21 October 1980) is a German curler. He was born in Hamburg. He competed at the 2011 European Curling Championships in Moscow, at the 2012 World Curling Championships in Basel, and at the 2014 Winter Olympics in Sochi.
