= Tony Träskelin =

Finnish male curler

- Curler ♂

Team
- Curling club: Oulunkylä Curling, Helsinki

Curling career
- Member Association: Finland
- World Championship: 1 (2003)
- European Championship: 1 (2002)
- Other appearances: World Junior Championships: 1 (1998)
Medal record
Curling
Finnish Men's Championship
Silver medal – second place	2007
Bronze medal – third place	2003

Tony Träskelin is a Finnish male curler.

== Teams ==
Season	Skip	Third	Second	Lead	Alternate	Coach	Events
1997–98	Aku Kauste	Okko Kauste	Kim Träskelin	Tony Träskelin			FJCC 1998 (silver)
1998–99	Aku Kauste	Okko Kauste	Kim Träskelin	Tony Träskelin			FJCC 1999 (silver)
1998–99	Aku Kauste	Kim Träskelin	Tony Träskelin	Okko Kauste	Markus Sipilä	Timo Kauste	WJCChal 1999 (5th)
1999–00	Aku Kauste	Okko Kauste	Tony Träskelin	Kim Träskelin			FJCC 2000 (bronze)
2002–03	Markku Uusipaavalniemi	Wille Mäkelä	Aku Kauste	Tony Träskelin	Kim Träskelin		ECC 2002 (4th)
2002–03	Markku Uusipaavalniemi	Aku Kauste	Tony Träskelin	Kim Träskelin	Okko Kauste		FMCC 2003 (bronze)
2002–03	Markku Uusipaavalniemi	Kalle Kiiskinen	Aku Kauste	Teemu Salo	Tony Träskelin		WCC 2003 (4th)
2006–07	Aku Kauste	Antti Orrainen	Tony Träskelin	Olli Orrainen	Okko Kauste		FMCC 2007 (silver)
2007–08	Aku Kauste	Tony Träskelin	Olli Orrainen	Okko Kauste	Tero Tähtinen, Antti Orrainen		FMCC 2008 (5th)
