= Jermu Pöllänen =

Finnish curler (born 1973)

- Curler ♂
- Born: 6 August 1973 (age 53)

Team
- Curling club: Helsingin Yliopiston Curlaajat CC, Helsinki, Hyvinkää CC, Hyvinkää
- Skip: Jermu Pöllänen
- Third: Janne Ojanperä
- Second: Juha Pääjärvi
- Lead: Jere Sullanmaa
- Alternate: Iikko Säntti

Curling career
- Member Association: Finland
- World Championship: 1 (2022)
- European Championship: 6 (2009, 2013, 2019, 2021, 2022, 2023)
Medal record
Curling
Finnish Men's Championship
Gold medal – first place	2009
Gold medal – first place	2013
Silver medal – second place	2005
Silver medal – second place	2006
Silver medal – second place	2012
Silver medal – second place	2016
Silver medal – second place	2025
Silver medal – second place	2019
Bronze medal – third place	2007
Bronze medal – third place	2008
Bronze medal – third place	2011
Bronze medal – third place	2023
Bronze medal – third place	2024

Jermu Pöllänen (born 6 August 1973) is a Finnish curler and curling coach.

At the national level, he is a two-time Finnish men's champion curler.

== Teams ==
=== Men's ===
Season	Skip	Third	Second	Lead	Alternate	Coach	Events
1999–00	Jermu Pöllänen	?	?	?			FMCC 2000 (8th)
2002–03	Tomi Rantamäki	Jermu Pöllänen	Vesa Hirsimaa	Petteri Hietanen	Timo Patrikka, Jussi Heinonsalo		FMCC 2003 (4th)
2004–05	Tomi Rantamäki	Timo Patrikka	Jermu Pöllänen	Juha Pekaristo	Ville Lehmuskoski		FMCC 2005 (silver)
2005–06	Tomi Rantamäki	Timo Patrikka	Jermu Pöllänen	Juha Pekaristo	Ville Lehmuskoski		FMCC 2006 (silver)
2006–07	Tomi Rantamäki	Juha Pekaristo	Jermu Pöllänen	Timo Patrikka	Ville Lehmuskoski		FMCC 2007 (bronze)
2007–08	Tomi Rantamäki	Riku Harjula	Jermu Pöllänen	Jere Sullanmaa	Timo Patrikka, Jussi Knuutinen		FMCC 2008 (bronze)
2008–09	Tomi Rantamäki	Jermu Pöllänen	Timo Patrikka	Lauri Ikävalko	Ville Lehmuskoski, Jussi Heinonsalo		FMCC 2009 (gold)
2009–10	Tomi Rantamäki	Timo Patrikka	Jermu Pöllänen	Lauri Ikävalko	Aku Kauste	Tomi Rantamäki	ECC 2009 (9th)
2009–10	Tomi Rantamäki	Timo Patrikka	Jermu Pöllänen	Lauri Ikävalko	Jussi Uusipaavalniemi	Tomi Rantamäki	FMCC 2010 (5th)
2010–11	Tomi Rantamäki	Kimmo Ilvonen	Lauri Ikavalko	Timo Patrikka	Jermu Pöllänen, Jussi Uusipaavalniemi		FMCC 2011 (bronze)
2011–12	Tomi Rantamäki	Kimmo Ilvonen	Timo Patrikka	Pekka Peura	Jermu Pöllänen, Jussi Uusipaavalniemi		FMCC 2012 (silver)
2012–13	Tomi Rantamäki	Toni Anttila	Kimmo Ilvonen	Timo Patrikka	Pekka Peura, Jermu Pöllänen		FMCC 2013 (gold)
2012–13	Tomi Rantamäki	Jussi Uusipaavalniemi	Pekka Peura	Jermu Pöllänen			
2013–14	Toni Anttila (fourth)	Tomi Rantamäki (skip)	Pekka Peura	Jermu Pöllänen	Kimmo Ilvonen		ECC 2013 (10th)
2013–14	Tomi Rantamäki	Timo Patrikka	Jermu Pöllänen	Pekka Peura	Toni Anttila, Kimmo Ilvonen		FMCC 2014 (5th)
2013–14	Tomi Rantamäki	Pekka Peura	Kimmo Ilvonen	Jermu Pöllänen			
2014–15	Tomi Rantamäki	Pekka Peura	Jere Sullanmaa	Jermu Pöllänen			FMCC 2015 (5th)
2015–16	Tomi Rantamäki	Pekka Peura	Jermu Pöllänen	Jere Sullanmaa	Iikko Säntti	Tomi Rantamäki	FMCC 2016 (silver)
2016–17	Tomi Rantamäki	Pekka Peura	Jermu Pöllänen	Jere Sullanmaa	Iikko Säntti		FMCC 2017 (4th)
2017–18	Tomi Rantamäki	Jermu Pöllänen	Jere Sullanmaa	Iikko Säntti			FMCC 2018 (4th)
2019–20	Jere Sullanmaa (fourth)	Jason Moore	Iikko Saentti	Jermu Pöllänen (skip)	Melker Lundberg	Tero Taehtinen	ECC 2019 (12th)
2021–22	Kalle Kiiskinen	Teemu Salo	Leo Ouni	Paavo Kuosmanen	Jermu Pöllänen	Jouni Mikkonen	ECC 2021 (10th); OQE 2021 (5th); WCC 2022 (11th)
2022–23	Kalle Kiiskinen	Teemu Salo	Jermu Pöllänen	Paavo Kuosmanen	Jouni Mikkonen		ECC 2022 (12th)
2022–23	Jermu Pöllänen	Janne Ojanperä	Juha Pääjärvi	Jere Sullanmaa	Iikko Säntti		FMCC 2023 (bronze)
2023–24	Kalle Kiiskinen	Teemu Salo	Leo Ouni	Paavo Kuosmanen	Jermu Pöllänen	Jouni Mikkonen	ECC 2023 (10th)
2023–24	Jermu Pöllänen	Janne Ojanperä	Juha Pääjärvi	Jere Sullanmaa	Iikko Säntti		FMCC 2024 (bronze)
2024–25	Jermu Pöllänen	Janne Ojanperä	Juha Pääjärvi	Iikko Säntti			FMCC 2025 (silver)

=== Mixed ===
Season	Skip	Third	Second	Lead	Alternate	Events
2006–07	Tomi Rantamäki	Kirsi Nykänen	Kalle Kiiskinen	Tiina Julkunen	Katja Kiiskinen, Jermu Pöllänen	FMxCC 2007 (silver)
2007–08	Tomi Rantamäki	Kirsi Nykänen	Tiina Julkunen	Jermu Pöllänen	Jere Sullanmaa	FMxCC 2008 (5th)

== Record as a coach of national teams ==
Year	Tournament, event	National team	Place
2008	2008 World Mixed Doubles Curling Championship	Finland (mixed double)	2nd place, silver medalist(s)

== Personal life ==
He is the husband of fellow Finnish curler Riikka Louhivuori. They have two children.

He started curling in 1995 at the age of 22.
