= Finnish Mixed Curling Championship =

Annual championship in Finland

The Finnish Mixed Doubles Curling Championship is the national championship of mixed curling in Finland. It has been held annually since 2005.

== List of champions and medallists ==
Year	Champion	Runner-up	Bronze
2005	Markku Uusipaavalniemi, Kirsi Nykänen, Teemu Salo, Tiina Kautonen	Aku Kauste, Sanna Puustinen, Riku Harjula, Bettina Mandelin	Jussi Uusipaavalniemi, Anne Malmi, Petri Tsutsunen, Johanna Pyyhtiä
2006	Jussi Uusipaavalniemi, Anne Malmi, Petri Tsutsunen, Johanna Pyyhtiä	Pekka Vaittinen, Sari Laakkonen, Mikko Saastamoinen, Outi Niskanen	Aku Kauste, Gia Tulilahti, Riku Harjula, Bettina Mandelin
2007	Jussi Uusipaavalniemi, Jaana Pyyhtiä, Petri Tsutsunen, Anne Malmi, alternate: Teemu Salo	Tomi Rantamäki, Kirsi Nykänen, Kalle Kiiskinen, Tiina Julkunen, alternates: Katja Kiiskinen, Jermu Pöllänen	Timo Kauste, Kirsti Kauste, Kai Pahl, Helena Pahl
2008	Jussi Uusipaavalniemi, Kirsi Kaski, Paavo Kuosmanen, Jaana Hämäläinen	Anne Malmi, Olavi Malmi, Riku Harjula, Sari Auvinen, alternates: Tytti Haapasaari, Toni Sepperi	Lare Norri, Peter Landgrén, Marjo Hippi, Juha Pääjärvi
2009	Jussi Uusipaavalniemi, Kirsi Kaski, Paavo Kuosmanen, Jaana Hämäläinen	Aku Kauste, Oona Kauste, Timo Kauste, Kirsti Kauste	Anne Malmi, Olavi Malmi, Sari Auvinen, Leo Mäkelä, alternates: Tytti Haapasaari, Niklas Malmi
2010	Tomi Rantamäki, Katja Kiiskinen, Juha Pekaristo, Bettina Mandelin	Toni Sepperi, Jere Sullanmaa, Heidi Hossi, Eszter Juhász, alternate: Jarmo Kalilainen	Aku Kauste, Kirsti Kauste, Timo Kauste, Oona Kauste
2011	Jussi Uusipaavalniemi, Kirsi Kaski, Paavo Kuosmanen, Jaana Hämäläinen	Aku Kauste, Oona Kauste, Pauli Jäämies, Sanna Puustinen	Toni Anttila, Katja Kiiskinen, Tiina Suuripää, Kasper Hakunti
2012	Aku Kauste, Sanna Puustinen, Pauli Jäämies, Oona Kauste	Katja Kiiskinen, Toni Sepperi, Jere Sullanmaa, Milja Hellsten, alternate: Arttu Pietilä	Tomi Rantamäki, Heidi Hossi, Juha Pääjärvi, Marjo Hippi
2013	Tomi Rantamäki, Anne Malmi, Pekka Peura, Tiina Suuripää, coach: Olavi Malmi	Toni Sepperi, Jere Sullanmaa, Jenni Räsänen, Milja Hellsten	Perttu Piilo, Sanna Puustinen, Heidi Hossi, Pauli Jäämies
2014	Tomi Rantamäki, Anne Malmi, Pekka Peura, Tiina Suuripää, coach: Olavi Malmi	Jussi Uusipaavalniemi, Paavo Kuosmanen, Jaana Hämäläinen, Katja Kiiskinen	Perttu Piilo, Sanna Puustinen, Heidi Hossi, Kimmo Ilvonen
2015	Tomi Rantamäki, Anne Malmi, Iikko Säntti, Tiina Suuripää, coach: Olavi Malmi	Joni Ikonen, Milja Hellsten, Jenni Sullanmaa, Jere Sullanmaa	Pauli Jäämies, Katja Kiiskinen, Antti Männynväli, Hanna Männynväli
2016	Toni Sepperi, Milja Hellsten, Jenni Räsänen, Jere Sullanmaa	Anne Malmi, Niklas Malmi, Tiina Suuripää, Iikko Säntti	Jari Turto, Ari Kuusholma, Tuula Merentie, Miia Turto
2017	Jussi Uusipaavalniemi, Laura Kitti, Paavo Kuosmanen, Johanna Pyyhtiä	Jari Turto, Ari Kuusholma, Tuula Merentie, Miia Turto	Markus Sipilä, Lotta Immonen, Leo Ouni, Tiina Suuripää
2018	Markus Sipilä, Lotta Immonen, Leo Ouni, Tiina Suuripää	Mikko Saastamoinen, Ville Kärkkäinen, Ulla Sten, Elina Virtaala	Jussi Uusipaavalniemi, Laura Kitti, Paavo Kuosmanen, Johanna Pyyhtiä
2019	Markus Sipilä, Lotta Immonen, Leo Ouni, Tiina Suuripää	Jussi Uusipaavalniemi, Laura Kitti, Paavo Kuosmanen, Johanna Pyyhtiä	Mika Malinen, Jaana Malinen, Mikko Saastamoinen, Ulla Sten
2020	Markus Sipilä, Lotta Immonen, Iikko Säntti, Tiina Suuripää	Jussi Uusipaavalniemi, Laura Kitti, Paavo Kuosmanen, Johanna Pyyhtiä	Hermanni Hakanpää, Elina Virtaala, Valtteri Kinnunen, Eila Ilmakangas
2021	not held because COVID-19 pandemic		
2022	Markus Sipilä, Lotta Immonen, Iikko Säntti, Tiina Suuripää	Mikko Saastamoinen, Ulla Saastamoinen, Mika Malinen, Jaana Malinen	Mika Äikiä, Eeva Haapanen, Kari Haajanen, Sirja Paju
2023	Markus Sipilä, Lotta Immonen, Leo Ouni, Tiina Suuripää	Iikko Säntti, Arto Laine, Susanna Säntti, Virpi Säntti	Jussi Uusipaavalniemi, Jaana Laurikka, Paavo Kuosmanen, Bonnie Nilhamn-Kuosmanen
2024	Jussi Uusipaavalniemi, Jaana Laurikka, Paavo Kuosmanen, Bonnie Nilhamn-Kuosmanen	Iikko Säntti, Arto Laine, Susanna Säntti, Virpi Säntti	Ella Eivola, Ilkka Eivola, Maria Kirjonen, Tomi Kirjonen

(Order: Skip, third, second, lead)

== See also ==
- Finnish Men's Curling Championship
- Finnish Women's Curling Championship
- Finnish Mixed Doubles Curling Championship
- Finnish Junior Curling Championships
- Finnish Wheelchair Curling Championship
- Finnish Wheelchair Mixed Doubles Curling Championship
