= Juha Pekaristo =

Finnish male curler

- Curler ♂

Team
- Curling club: Hyvinkää CC, Hyvinkää

Curling career
- Member Association: Finland
- World Championship: 1 (2009)
- European Championship: 3 (2008, 2010, 2018)
- Other appearances: World Junior Championships: 1 (1998)
Medal record
Curling
Finnish Men's Championship
Gold medal – first place	2008
Gold medal – first place	2010
Gold medal – first place	2015
Gold medal – first place	2018
Gold medal – first place	2020 Lohja
Silver medal – second place	2003
Silver medal – second place	2005
Silver medal – second place	2006
Silver medal – second place	2013
Silver medal – second place	2014
Silver medal – second place	2017
Silver medal – second place	2019
Bronze medal – third place	2007
Bronze medal – third place	2009

Juha Pekaristo is a Finnish male curler.

At the national level, he is a five-time Finnish men's champion curler (2008, 2010, 2015, 2018, 2020), a 2010 Finnish mixed champion curler and a two-time Finnish junior champion curler (1998, 1999).

He started curling in 1993.

== Teams ==
=== Men's ===
Season	Skip	Third	Second	Lead	Alternate	Coach	Events
1997–98	Juha Pekaristo	Ari-Matti Ruottu	Olli Orrainen	Ville Tuominen			FJCC 1998 (gold)
1997–98	Juha Pekaristo	Aku Kauste	Olli Orrainen	Ari-Matti Ruottu	Ville Tuominen		WJCC 1998 (10th)
1998–99	Juha Pekaristo	Ari-Matti Ruottu	Olli Orrainen	Markus Sipilä			FJCC 1999 (gold)
1998–99	Juha Pekaristo	?	?	?			FMCC 1999 (5th)
2002–03	Perttu Piilo	Kalle Kiiskinen	Teemu Salo	Paavo Kuosmanen	Juha Pekaristo		FMCC 2003 (silver)
2004–05	Tomi Rantamäki	Timo Patrikka	Jermu Pöllänen	Juha Pekaristo	Ville Lehmuskoski		FMCC 2005 (silver)
2005–06	Tomi Rantamäki	Timo Patrikka	Jermu Pöllänen	Juha Pekaristo	Ville Lehmuskoski		FMCC 2006 (silver)
2006–07	Tomi Rantamäki	Juha Pekaristo	Jermu Pöllänen	Timo Patrikka	Ville Lehmuskoski		FMCC 2007 (bronze)
2007–08	Kalle Kiiskinen	Teemu Salo	Jari Rouvinen	Jani Sullanmaa	Tuomas Vuori, Juha Pekaristo		FMCC 2008 (gold)
2008–09	Kalle Kiiskinen	Jani Sullanmaa	Teemu Salo	Jari Rouvinen	Juha Pekaristo	Paavo Kuosmanen	ECC 2008 (11th)
2008–09	Kalle Kiiskinen	Teemu Salo	Juha Pekaristo	Jani Sullanmaa	Jari Rouvinen		FMCC 2009 (bronze)
2008–09	Kalle Kiiskinen	Teemu Salo	Jani Sullanmaa	Jari Rouvinen	Juha Pekaristo	Paavo Kuosmanen	WCC 2009 (12th)
2009–10	Kalle Kiiskinen	Paavo Kuosmanen	Juha Pekaristo	Perttu Piilo	Teemu Salo		FMCC 2010 (gold)
2010–11	Kalle Kiiskinen	Perttu Piilo	Teemu Salo	Paavo Kuosmanen	Juha Pekaristo	Jari Rouvinen	ECC 2010 (15th)
2010–11	Kalle Kiiskinen	Paavo Kuosmanen	Perttu Piilo	Teemu Salo	Juha Pekaristo		FMCC 2011 (4th)
2011–12	Kalle Kiiskinen	Paavo Kuosmanen	Perttu Piilo	Juha Pekaristo	Teemu Salo, Jari Rouvinen		FMCC 2012 (5th)
2012–13	Kalle Kiiskinen	Perttu Piilo	Teemu Salo	Juha Pekaristo	Paavo Kuosmanen, Wille Mäkelä		FMCC 2013 (silver)
2013–14	Kalle Kiiskinen	Juha Pekaristo	Perttu Piilo	Wille Mäkelä	Teemu Salo, Paavo Kuosmanen		FMCC 2014 (silver)
2014–15	Kalle Kiiskinen	Paavo Kuosmanen	Wille Mäkelä	Teemu Salo	Juha Pekaristo, Jari Rouvinen		FMCC 2015 (gold)
2015–16	Kalle Kiiskinen	Wille Mäkelä	Juha Pekaristo	Teemu Salo	Paavo Kuosmanen		FMCC 2016 (5th)
2016–17	Kalle Kiiskinen	Paavo Kuosmanen	Wille Mäkelä	Juha Pekaristo	Teemu Salo		FMCC 2017 (silver)
2017–18	Kalle Kiiskinen	Paavo Kuosmanen	Wille Mäkelä	Juha Pekaristo	Teemu Salo		FMCC 2018 (gold)
2018–19	Wille Mäkelä	Kalle Kiiskinen	Teemu Salo	Juha Pekaristo	Paavo Kuosmanen	Jouni Mikkonen	ECC 2018 (9th)
2018–19	Wille Mäkelä	Kalle Kiiskinen	Paavo Kuosmanen	Juha Pekaristo	Teemu Salo		FMCC 2019 (silver)
2019–20	Kalle Kiiskinen	Paavo Kuosmanen	Wille Mäkelä	Juha Pekaristo	Teemu Salo	Jouni Mikkonen	FMCC 2020 (gold)

=== Mixed ===
Season	Skip	Third	Second	Lead	Events
2009–10	Tomi Rantamäki	Katja Kiiskinen	Juha Pekaristo	Bettina Mandelin	FMxCC 2010 (gold)
