= Perttu Piilo =

Finnish male curler and coach

- Curler ♂
- Born: 12 November 1975 (age 51)

Team
- Curling club: Hyvinkää CC, Hyvinkää, Oulunkylä Curlinghalli, Helsinki

Curling career
- Member Association: Finland
- World Championship: 2 (2000, 2005)
- European Championship: 2 (2004, 2010)
- Other appearances: World Junior Championships: 2 (1995, 1997)
Medal record
Curling
World Championships
Bronze medal – third place	2000 Glasgow
Finnish Men's Championship
Gold medal – first place	2005
Gold medal – first place	2006
Gold medal – first place	2010
Silver medal – second place	2000
Silver medal – second place	2001
Silver medal – second place	2002
Silver medal – second place	2003
Silver medal – second place	2008
Silver medal – second place	2013
Silver medal – second place	2014
Bronze medal – third place	1999
Bronze medal – third place	2018
World Junior Championships
Silver medal – second place	1997 Karuizawa

Perttu Piilo (born 12 November 1975) is a Finnish male curler and curling coach.

He is a 2000 World men's curling bronze medallist and three-time Finnish men's champion.

He started curling in 1990 when he was 15 years old.

== Teams ==
=== Men's ===
Season	Skip	Third	Second	Lead	Alternate	Coach	Events
1994–95	Perttu Piilo	Teemu Salo	Kalle Kiiskinen	Paavo Kuosmanen	Riko Raunio		WJCC 1995 (9th)
1996–97	Perttu Piilo	Kalle Kiiskinen	Paavo Kuosmanen	Petri Manninen	Olli Orrainen		WJCC 1997 (silver)
1998–99	Perttu Piilo	?	?	?			FMCC 1999 (bronze)
1999–00	Perttu Piilo	?	?	?			FMCC 2000 (silver)
1999–00	Markku Uusipaavalniemi	Wille Mäkelä	Tommi Häti	Jari Laukkanen	Perttu Piilo	Eeva Röthlisberger	WCC 2000 (bronze)
2000–01	Perttu Piilo	?	?	?			FMCC 2001 (silver)
2001–02	Perttu Piilo	?	?	?			FMCC 2002 (silver)
2002–03	Perttu Piilo	Kalle Kiiskinen	Teemu Salo	Paavo Kuosmanen	Juha Pekaristo		FMCC 2003 (silver)
2004–05	Markku Uusipaavalniemi	Kalle Kiiskinen	Perttu Piilo	Teemu Salo	Aku Kauste (ECC)		ECC 2004 (11th); FMCC 2005 (gold)
2004–05	Markku Uusipaavalniemi	Wille Mäkelä	Kalle Kiiskinen	Teemu Salo	Perttu Piilo	Perttu Piilo	WCC 2005 (5th)
2005–06	Markku Uusipaavalniemi	Teemu Salo	Kalle Kiiskinen	Wille Mäkelä	Perttu Piilo		FMCC 2006 (gold)
2006–07	Jussi Uusipaavalniemi	Jukka Savonen	Petri Tsutsunen	Miska Arminen	Perttu Piilo, Paavo Kuosmanen		FMCC 2007 (5th)
2007–08	Jussi Uusipaavalniemi	Paavo Kuosmanen	Perttu Piilo	Petri Tsutsunen	Jukka Savonen		FMCC 2008 (silver)
2008–09	Jussi Uusipaavalniemi	Perttu Piilo	Paavo Kuosmanen	Petri Tsutsunen	Jukka Savonen		FMCC 2009 (5th)
2009–10	Kalle Kiiskinen	Paavo Kuosmanen	Juha Pekaristo	Perttu Piilo	Teemu Salo		FMCC 2010 (gold)
2010–11	Kalle Kiiskinen	Perttu Piilo	Teemu Salo	Paavo Kuosmanen	Juha Pekaristo	Jari Rouvinen	ECC 2010 (15th); FMCC 2011 (4th)
2011–12	Kalle Kiiskinen	Paavo Kuosmanen	Perttu Piilo	Juha Pekaristo	Teemu Salo, Jari Rouvinen		FMCC 2012 (5th)
2012–13	Kalle Kiiskinen	Perttu Piilo	Teemu Salo	Juha Pekaristo	Paavo Kuosmanen, Wille Mäkelä		FMCC 2013 (silver)
2013–14	Kalle Kiiskinen	Juha Pekaristo	Perttu Piilo	Wille Mäkelä	Teemu Salo, Paavo Kuosmanen		FMCC 2014 (silver)
2014–15	Toni Anttila	Kimmo Ilvonen	Perttu Piilo	Juha Pääjärvi	Kimmo Ilvonen		FMCC 2015 (4th)
2015–16	Markus Sipilä	Perttu Piilo	Juha Paajarvi	Leo Ouni	Janne Ojanpera		FMCC 2016 (6th)
2017–18	Jani Sullanmaa	Toni Anttila	Joni Ikonen	Kimmo Ilvonen	Perttu Piilo, Toni Sepperi		FMCC 2018 (bronze)

=== Mixed ===
Season	Skip	Third	Second	Lead	Events
2013	Perttu Piilo	Sanna Puustinen	Heidi Hossi	Pauli Jäämies	FMxCC 2013 (bronze)
2014	Perttu Piilo	Sanna Puustinen	Heidi Hossi	Kimmo Ilvonen	FMxCC 2014 (bronze)

=== Mixed doubles ===
Season	Female	Male	Events
2013	Sanna Piilo	Perttu Piilo	FMDCC 2013 (5th)
2014	Sanna Piilo	Perttu Piilo	FMDCC 2014 (bronze)
2015	Sanna Piilo	Perttu Piilo	FMDCC 2015 (5th)
2016	Sanna Piilo	Perttu Piilo	FMDCC 2016 (bronze)

== Record as a coach of national teams ==
Year	Tournament, event	National team	Place
2005	2005 World Men's Curling Championship	Finland (men)	5
2013	2013 European Curling Championships	Finland (women)	11
2014	2014 European Curling Championships	Finland (women)	6
2015	2015 World Women's Curling Championship	Finland (women)	11
2017	2017 Olympic Qualification event	Finland (women)	7
