= Jari Rouvinen =

Finnish male curler and coach

- Curler ♂

Team
- Curling club: Hyvinkää CC, Hyvinkää, Oulunkylä Curlinghalli, Helsinki

Curling career
- Member Association: Finland
- World Championship: 3 (2006, 2007, 2009)
- European Championship: 4 (2003, 2006, 2007, 2008)
- Other appearances: World Junior Championships: 1 (2003), World Junior B Championships: 2 (2002, 2003)
Medal record
Curling
Finnish Men's Championship
Gold medal – first place	2003
Gold medal – first place	2007
Gold medal – first place	2008
Gold medal – first place	2015
Bronze medal – third place	2005
Bronze medal – third place	2006
Bronze medal – third place	2009

Jari Rouvinen is a Finnish male curler and curling coach.

At the national level, he is a four-time Finnish men's champion curler (2003, 2007, 2008, 2015) and two-time Finnish junior champion curler (2001, 2002).

He started curling in 2001.

== Teams ==
Season	Skip	Third	Second	Lead	Alternate	Coach	Events
2000–01	Tuomas Vuori	Jani Sullanmaa	Jari Rouvinen	Tero Salo	Jarmo Kalilainen		FJCC 2001 (gold)
2001–02	Tuomas Vuori	Tero Salo	Jani Sullanmaa	Jarmo Kalilainen	Jari Rouvinen		WJBCC 2002 (6th)
2001–02	Tuomas Vuori	Jani Sullanmaa	Jari Rouvinen	Tero Salo	Jarmo Kalilainen		FJCC 2002 (gold)
2002–03	Tuomas Vuori	Jani Sullanmaa	Jari Rouvinen	Jarmo Kalilainen	Tero Salo	Juhani Heinonen (WJCC)	WJBCC 2003 (silver); WJCC 2003 (9th)
2002–03	Wille Mäkelä	Tuomas Vuori	Jani Sullanmaa	Tero Salo	Jari Rouvinen, Jarmo Kalilainen		FMCC 2003 (gold)
2003–04	Wille Mäkelä	Tuomas Vuori	Jani Sullanmaa	Jari Rouvinen	Jarmo Kalilainen		ECC 2003 (9th)
2004–05	Tuomas Vuori	Paavo Kuosmanen	Jari Rouvinen	Jani Sullanmaa	Tero Salo, Tommi Rouvinen		FMCC 2005 (bronze)
2005–06	Tuomas Vuori	Paavo Kuosmanen	Jari Rouvinen	Jere Sullanmaa	Tommi Rouvinen		FMCC 2006 (bronze)
2005–06	Kalle Kiiskinen (fourth)	Markku Uusipaavalniemi (skip)	Jani Sullanmaa	Teemu Salo	Jari Rouvinen		WCC 2006 (5th)
2006–07	Markku Uusipaavalniemi	Kalle Kiiskinen	Jani Sullanmaa	Teemu Salo	Jari Rouvinen (all); Tuomas Vuori (FMCC)		ECC 2006 (6th); FMCC 2007 (gold); WCC 2007 (6th)
2007–08	Kalle Kiiskinen	Jani Sullanmaa	Teemu Salo	Jari Rouvinen	Wille Mäkelä	Tuomas Vuori	ECC 2007 (6th)
2007–08	Kalle Kiiskinen	Teemu Salo	Jari Rouvinen	Jani Sullanmaa	Tuomas Vuori, Juha Pekaristo		FMCC 2008 (gold)
2008–09	Kalle Kiiskinen	Jani Sullanmaa	Teemu Salo	Jari Rouvinen	Juha Pekaristo	Paavo Kuosmanen	ECC 2008 (11th)
2008–09	Kalle Kiiskinen	Teemu Salo	Juha Pekaristo	Jani Sullanmaa	Jari Rouvinen		FMCC 2009 (bronze)
2008–09	Kalle Kiiskinen	Teemu Salo	Jani Sullanmaa	Jari Rouvinen	Juha Pekaristo	Paavo Kuosmanen	WCC 2009 (12th)
2010–11	Jani Sullanmaa	Iiro Sipola	Jari Rouvinen	Oskar Ainola	Roni Pakkala		FMCC 2011 (6th)
2011–12	Kalle Kiiskinen	Paavo Kuosmanen	Perttu Piilo	Juha Pekaristo	Teemu Salo, Jari Rouvinen		FMCC 2012 (5th)
2014–15	Kalle Kiiskinen	Paavo Kuosmanen	Wille Mäkelä	Teemu Salo	Juha Pekaristo, Jari Rouvinen		FMCC 2015 (gold)

== Record as a coach of national teams ==
Year	Tournament, event	National team	Place
2010	2010 European Curling Championships	Finland (men)	15
