= Markus Sipilä =

Finnish curler (born 1980)

- Curler ♂
- Born: 14 January 1980 (age 46)

Team
- Curling club: Kisakallio CC, Lohja
- Mixed doubles partner: Lotta Immonen

Curling career
- Member Association: Finland
- World Mixed Doubles Championship: 3 (2022, 2025, 2026)
- Other appearances: World Mixed Championship: 3 (2018, 2019, 2022)
Medal record
Curling
Finnish Men's Championship
Bronze medal – third place	2019
Bronze medal – third place	2020 Lohja
Finnish Mixed Doubles Championship
Gold medal – first place	2022 Joensuu
Gold medal – first place	2023 Eckerö
Gold medal – first place	2024 Harjavalta
Silver medal – second place	2025 Eckerö
Gold medal – first place	2026 Hyvinkää

Markus Sipilä (born 14 January 1980) is a Finnish curler.

At the national level, he is a five-time Finnish mixed champion curler (2018, 2019, 2020, 2022, 2023) and four-time Finnish mixed doubles champion curler (2022, 2023, 2024, 2026).

== Teams ==
=== Men's ===
Season	Skip	Third	Second	Lead	Alternate	Coach	Events
1998–99	Tomi Rantamäki	Petteri Hietanen	Markus Sipilä	Vesa Hirsimaa			FMCC 1999 (5th)
1998–99	Juha Pekaristo	Ari-Matti Ruottu	Olli Orrainen	Markus Sipilä			FJCC 1999 (gold)
2006–07	Toni Sepperi	Antti Korhonen	Aki Latvanne	Markus Sipilä	Vesa Hirsimaa		FMCC 2007 (8th)
2007–08	Toni Sepperi	Janne Ojanperä	Juha Pääjärvi	Markus Sipilä	Aki Latvanne, Vesa Hirsimaa		FMCC 2008 (7th)
2008–09	Markus Sipilä	Vesa Hirsimaa	Tero Salo	Janne Ojanperä	Juha Pääjärvi		FMCC 2009 (7th)
2009–10	Markus Sipilä	Janne Ojanperä	Juha Pääjärvi	Tero Salo	Vesa Hirsimaa, Leo Mäkelä		FMCC 2010 (7th)
2010–11	Markus Sipilä	Juha Pääjärvi	Janne Ojanperä	Pekka Peura	Olli Orrainen, Tero Salo		FMCC 2011 (7th)
2011–12	Toni Sepperi	Jere Sullanmaa	Markus Sipilä	Juha Pääjärvi	Markus Kaustinen, Janne Ojanperä		FMCC 2012 (6th)
2012–13	Markus Sipilä	Janne Ojanperä	Juha Pääjärvi	Tero Salo	Matti Helmonen, Jaakko Uusitupa		
2013–14	Markus Sipilä	Juha Pääjärvi	Jaarko Uusitupa	Janne Ojanperä	Matti Helmonen		FMCC 2014 (6th)
2015–16	Markus Sipilä	Perttu Piilo	Juha Pääjärvi	Leo Ouni	Janne Ojanperä		FMCC 2016 (6th)
2016–17	Markus Sipilä	Erno Koliseva	Leo Mäkelä	Janne Ojanperä	Juha Pääjärvi	Perttu Piilo	FMCC 2017 (5th)
2017–18	Markus Sipilä	Erno Koliseva	Leo Ouni	Janne Ojanperä	Juha Pääjärvi		FMCC 2018 (5th)
2018–19	Markus Sipilä	Kasper Hakunti	Janne Ojanperä	Leo Ouni	Juha Pääjärvi		FMCC 2019 (bronze)
2019–20	Markus Sipilä	Kasper Hakunti	Janne Ojanperä	Leo Ouni	Juha Pääjärvi		FMCC 2020 (bronze)

=== Mixed ===
Season	Skip	Third	Second	Lead	Alternate	Coach	Events
2008–09	Ellen Vogt	Elisa Westerberg	Janne Ojanperä	Paula Lehtomäki	Markus Sipilä		FMxCC 2009 (4th)
2009–10	Markus Sipilä	Ellen Vogt	Elisa Westerberg	Janne Ojanperä	Nina Sipilä		FMxCC 2010 (10th)
2010–11	Ellen Vogt	Janne Ojanperä	Maija Salmiovirta	Markus Sipilä			FMxCC 2011 (4th)
2014–15	Toni Sepperi	Markus Sipilä	Jenni Räsänen	Emmi Lindroos			FMxCC 2015 (6th)
2016–17	Markus Sipilä	Lotta Immonen	Leo Ouni	Tiina Suuripää			FMxCC 2017 (bronze)
2017–18	Markus Sipilä	Lotta Immonen	Leo Ouni	Tiina Suuripää			FMxCC 2018 (gold)
2018–19	Markus Sipilä	Lotta Immonen	Leo Ouni	Tiina Suuripää			WMxCC 2018 (13th); FMxCC 2019 (gold)
2019–20	Markus Sipilä	Lotta Immonen	Leo Ouni	Tiina Suuripää		Paavo Kuosmanen	WMxCC 2019 (20th)
2019–20	Markus Sipilä	Lotta Immonen	Iikko Säntti	Tiina Suuripää			FMxCC 2020 (gold)
2021–22	Markus Sipilä	Lotta Immonen	Iikko Säntti	Tiina Suuripää			WMxCC 2022 (5th); FMxCC 2022 (gold)
2022–23	Markus Sipilä	Lotta Immonen	Leo Ouni	Tiina Suuripää			FMxCC 2023 (gold)

=== Mixed doubles ===
Season	Female	Male	Coach	Events
2012–13	Nina Sipilä	Markus Sipilä		FMDCC 2013 (12th)
2013–14	Nina Sipilä	Markus Sipilä		FMDCC 2014 (8th)
2021–22	Lotta Immonen	Markus Sipilä	Katja Kiiskinen (WMDCC)	FMDCC 2022 (gold); WMDCC 2022 (17th)
2022–23	Lotta Immonen	Markus Sipilä		FMDCC 2023 (gold)
2023–24	Lotta Immonen	Markus Sipilä		FMDCC 2024 (gold)
2024–25	Lotta Immonen	Markus Sipilä	Tomi Rantamäki (WMDCC)	FMDCC 2025 (silver); WMDCC 2025 (10th)
2025–26	Lotta Immonen	Markus Sipilä		FMDCC 2026 (gold); WMDCC 2026 (17th)

== Personal life ==
Markus is married to fellow curler Nina Sipilä and has two children.

He started curling in 1997 at the age of 17.
