= Finnish Junior Curling Championships =

The Finnish Junior Curling Championships is the national championships of men's and women's junior curling teams in Finland. Junior level curlers must be under the age of 21. The championships have been held annually since 1998 for junior men and since 2005 for junior women, organized by Finnish Curling Association (Finnish: Suomen Curlingliitto).

== List of champions and medallists ==
Teams line-up in order: skip/fourth, third, second, lead, alternate, coach; skips marked bold.

=== Men ===
Year	Champion	Runner-up	Bronze
1998	Hyvinkään Curling ry Juha Pekaristo, Ari-Matti Ruottu, Olli Orrainen, Ville Tuominen		
1999	Hyvinkään Curling ry Juha Pekaristo, Ari-Matti Ruottu, Olli Orrainen, Markus Sipilä		
2000	Perttu Immonen, Jarmo Kalilainen, Tero Salo, Arttu Immonen		
2002	Tuomas Vuori, Jani Sullanmaa, Jari Rouvinen, Tero Salo, Jarmo Kalilainen		
2003	Riku Harjula, Jussi Knuutinen, Jere Sullanmaa, Roni Pakkala		
2004	Riku Harjula, Jussi Knuutinen, Lauri Orrainen, Roni Pakkala		
2005	Joonas Hellevaara, Leo Mäkelä, Lauri Pöysti, ?		
2006	Joonas Hellevaara, Leo Mäkelä, Lauri Pöysti, Matias Salmi		
2007	Hyvinkään Curling ry Iiro Sipola, Oskar Ainola, Toni Ylhäinen, Esko Sinisalo		
2008	Joonas Hellevaara, Kalle Wallin, Kasper Hakunti, Leo Mäkelä, alternate: Lauri Pöysti		
2009	Iiro Sipola, Toni Ylhäinen, Oskar Ainola, Kalle Wallin, alternate: Kasper Hakunti		
2010-13	not held		
2014	Ålands Curlingklubb rf Melker Lundberg, Hemming Hanses, Orvar Nordberg, Isak Nordlund		
2015	Ålands Curlingklubb rf Melker Lundberg, Hemming Hanses, Isak Nordlund, Leonard Nordlund		
2016	Ålands Curlingklubb rf Melker Lundberg, Isak Nordlund, Hemming Hanses, Jonas Fellman, alternate: Leonard Nordlund		
2017	?		
2018	Joensuun Curling Ry; Juuso Virtaala, Jaakko Hokkanen, Tommi Jeskanen, Eero Litmanen, alternate: Urho Litmanen, coach: Matti Virtaala		

=== Women ===
Year	Champion	Runner-up	Bronze
2005	Tiina Holmi, Sanna Puustinen, Päivi Salonen, Heidi Hossi		
2006	Tiina Holmi, Sanna Puustinen, Päivi Salonen, Heidi Hossi		
2007	Tiina Holmi, Oona Kauste, Heidi Hossi, Päivi Salonen, alternate: Sanna Puustinen, coach: Katja Kiiskinen		
2008	Tiina Holmi, Oona Kauste, Heidi Hossi, Sanna Puustinen, alternate: Päivi Salonen		
2009-16	championship not held (or no data on Finnish Curling Association site)		

== See also ==
- Finnish Men's Curling Championship
- Finnish Women's Curling Championship
- Finnish Mixed Curling Championship
- Finnish Mixed Doubles Curling Championship
- Finnish Wheelchair Curling Championship
- Finnish Wheelchair Mixed Doubles Curling Championship
