= 2022 World Mixed Curling Championship =

2022 international sport competition

- Host city: Aberdeen, Scotland
- Arena: Curl Aberdeen
- Dates: 15–22 October
- Winner: Canada
- Curling club: Club de curling Etchemin, Saint-Romuald & Curling des Collines, Chelsea
- Skip: Jean-Michel Ménard
- Third: Marie-France Larouche
- Second: Ian Belleau
- Lead: Annie Lemay
- Coach: Éric Sylvain
- Finalist: Scotland (Bryce)

The 2022 World Mixed Curling Championship was held from 15 to 22 October in Aberdeen, Scotland. It was the first World Mixed Curling Championship held since 2019 because of the COVID-19 pandemic.

== Teams ==
The teams are listed as follows:

Australia	Austria	Canada	Chinese Taipei	Croatia
Fourth: Sean Hall; Third: Anne Powell; Skip: Hugh Millikin; Lead: Amanda Hlushak	Fourth: Teresa Treichl; Third: Martin Seiwald; Second: Emma Müller; Skip: Gernot Higatzberger	Skip: Jean-Michel Ménard; Third: Marie-France Larouche; Second: Ian Belleau; Lead: Annie Lemay	Fourth: Luis Yin Liu; Skip: Cheng Li-lin; Second: Victor Lee; Lead: Huang Shar-yin	Skip: Alberto Skendrović; Third: Zrinka Muhek; Second: Davor Džepina; Lead: Marta Muždalo
Czech Republic	Denmark	England	Estonia	Finland
Skip: Karel Hradec; Third: Karolína Frederiksen; Second: Michal Zdenka; Lead: Eliška Srnská	Skip: Mikael Qvist; Third: Gabriella Qvist; Second: Alexander Qvist; Lead: Trine Qvist	Fourth: Jonathan Havercroft; Skip: Fiona Spain; Second: Michael Opel; Lead: Samantha Leung	Skip: Mikhail Vlassov; Third: Kaidi Elmik; Second: Andres Jakobson; Lead: Anna Gromova	Skip: Markus Sipilä; Third: Lotta Immonen; Second: Leo Ouni; Lead: Tiina Suuripää
Germany	Hong Kong	Hungary	India	Ireland
Skip: Sixten Totzek; Third: Kim Sutor; Second: Joshua Sutor; Lead: Joy Sutor	Skip: Jason Chang; Third: Ling-Yue Hung; Second: Martin Yan; Lead: Wong Yuen Ting	Skip: Lőrinc Tatár; Third: Linda Joó; Second: Ottó Dániel Kalocsay; Lead: Vera Kalocsai-Van Dorp	Skip: P. N. Raju; Third: Richa Patel; Second: Vinay Goenka; Lead: Tejasree Govula	Skip: John Wilson; Third: Alison Fyfe; Second: Craig Whyte; Lead: Jen Ward
Italy	Japan	Latvia	Luxembourg	Mexico
Fourth: Fabio Sola; Skip: Denise Pimpini; Second: Marco Pascale; Lead: Emanuela Matino	Skip: Kai Tsuchiya; Third: Shunta Mizukami; Second: Erika Otani; Lead: Kohei Okamura	Skip: Renārs Freidensons; Third: Evita Regža; Second: Aleksandrs Baranovskis; Lead: Betija Gulbe	Skip: Alex Benoy; Third: Karen Wauters; Second: Lukas Jirousek; Lead: Maja Bjerg-Petersen	Skip: Diego Tompkins; Third: Estefana Quintero; Second: Mateo Tompkins; Lead: Mónica Diez
Netherlands	New Zealand	Nigeria	Norway	Portugal
Skip: Lisenka Bomas; Third: Bart Klomp; Second: Anandi Bomas; Lead: Bob Bomas	Skip: Dean Fotti; Third: Joanna Olszewski; Second: Matt Whineray; Lead: Sandra Thomas	Skip: Harold Woods III; Third: Anteequa Washington; Second: Tijani Cole; Lead: Sheila Daniel	Skip: Alexander Lindström; Third: Maia Ramsfjell; Second: Christoffer Svae; Lead: Pia Trulsen	Skip: Bridget Ribau; Third: Chris Ribau; Second: Sabrina Ribau; Lead: Joe Ribau
Scotland	Slovakia	Slovenia	South Korea	Spain
Skip: Cameron Bryce; Third: Lisa Davie; Second: Scott Hyslop; Lead: Robyn Munro	Fourth: Daniela Matulová; Skip: Juraj Gallo; Second: Melánia Kováčiková; Lead: Milan Moravčík	Skip: Štefan Sever; Third: Nina Kremžar; Second: Marko Harb; Lead: Patricija Černe	Skip: Kim Dea-hyun; Third: Bang Yu-jin; Second: Kwon Jun-i; Lead: Kim Hae-jung	Skip: Sergio Vez; Third: Oihane Otaegi; Second: Mikel Unanue; Lead: Daniela García
Sweden	Switzerland	Ukraine	United States	Wales
Fourth: Robin Ahlberg; Skip: Therese Westman; Second: Johannes Patz; Lead: Mikaela Altebro	Fourth: Yves Hess; Skip: Ursi Hegner; Second: Simon Hoehn; Lead: Chantal Schmid	Skip: Eduard Nikolov; Third: Oleksandra Kononenko; Second: Yaroslav Shchur; Lead: Anastasia Kotova	Skip: Caitlin Pulli; Third: Jeff Pulli; Second: Rebecca Andrew; Lead: Jason Scott	Skip: Adrian Meikle; Third: Dawn Watson; Second: Andrew Tanner; Lead: Judith Glazier

== Round-robin standings ==
Final round-robin standings

Key
Teams to Playoffs

Group A	Skip	W	L	W–L	DSC
Finland	Markus Sipilä	7	1	1–0	44.98
Canada	Jean-Michel Ménard	7	1	0–1	37.90
Denmark	Mikael Qvist	6	2	–	44.08
South Korea	Kim Dea-hyun	5	3	–	41.29
Hong Kong	Jason Chang	4	4	–	91.59
India	P. N. Raju	3	5	–	87.24
Portugal	Bridget Ribau	2	6	1–0	63.40
Slovenia	Štefan Sever	2	6	0–1	94.78
New Zealand	Dean Fotti	0	8	–	94.96

Group B	Skip	W	L	W–L	DSC
Sweden	Therese Westman	8	0	–	32.77
Japan	Kai Tsuchiya	6	2	1–0	63.48
Norway	Alexander Lindström	6	2	0–1	46.57
Czech Republic	Karel Hradec	5	3	1–0	79.86
Latvia	Renārs Freidensons	5	3	0–1	55.12
Ireland	John Wilson	3	5	–	79.27
Ukraine	Eduard Nikolov	2	6	–	112.95
Nigeria	Harold Woods III	1	7	–	136.81
Chinese Taipei	Cheng Li-lin	0	8	–	67.87

Group C	Skip	W	L	W–L	DSC
Switzerland	Ursi Hegner	8	0	–	26.08
Scotland	Cameron Bryce	7	1	–	42.97
Hungary	Lörinc Tatár	6	2	–	52.53
Australia	Hugh Millikin	5	3	–	46.30
Austria	Gernot Higatzberger	4	4	–	105.70
Slovakia	Juraj Gallo	3	5	–	64.88
Mexico	Diego Tompkins	2	6	–	84.10
England	Fiona Spain	1	7	–	70.27
Luxembourg	Alex Benoy	0	8	–	127.13

Group D	Skip	W	L	W–L	DSC
Germany	Sixten Totzek	7	0	–	38.38
Spain	Sergio Vez	6	1	–	55.80
Italy	Denise Pimpini	5	2	–	69.42
Wales	Adrian Meikle	3	4	1–0	85.24
United States	Caitlin Pulli	3	4	0–1	56.76
Estonia	Mikhail Vlassov	2	5	–	57.11
Netherlands	Lisenka Bomas	1	6	1–0	93.56
Croatia	Alberto Skendrović	1	6	0–1	146.75

Group A Round Robin Summary Table
Pos.	Country	Canada	Denmark	Finland	Hong Kong	India	New Zealand	Portugal	Slovenia	South Korea	Record
2	Canada	—	8–1	3–5	8–3	9–2	10–3	7–4	12–2	7–6	7–1
3	Denmark	1–8	—	4–8	14–1	9–1	8–2	6–5	7–1	6–4	6–2
1	Finland	5–3	8–4	—	6–3	8–2	15–1	8–4	5–2	3–7	7–1
5	Hong Kong	3–8	1–14	3–6	—	7–4	11–3	10–1	5–11	6–5	4–4
6	India	2–9	1–9	2–8	4–7	—	6–3	9–8	7–6	1–12	3–5
9	New Zealand	3–10	2–8	1–15	3–11	3–6	—	5–9	1–12	0–15	0–8
7	Portugal	4–7	5–6	4–8	1–10	8–9	9–5	—	8–1	4–6	2–6
8	Slovenia	2–12	1–7	2–5	11–5	6–7	12–1	1–8	—	4–8	2–6
4	South Korea	6–7	4–6	7–3	5–6	12–1	15–0	6–4	8–4	—	5–3

Group B Round Robin Summary Table
Pos.	Country	Chinese Taipei	Czech Republic		Japan	Latvia	Nigeria	Norway	Sweden	Ukraine	Record
9	Chinese Taipei	—	2–9	5–7	2–12	4–6	8–10	5–6	3–7	6–9	0–8
4	Czech Republic	9–2	—	9–2	2–9	8–4	11–2	5–6	1–9	6–4	5–3
6	Ireland	7–5	2–9	—	4–8	5–7	6–2	2–9	2–10	8–3	3–5
2	Japan	12–2	9–2	8–4	—	2–6	11–6	6–5	1–9	9–4	6–2
5	Latvia	6–4	4–8	7–5	6–2	—	16–3	7–8	2–10	8–3	5–3
8	Nigeria	10–8	2–11	2–6	6–11	3–16	—	2–16	2–9	2–12	1–7
3	Norway	6–5	6–5	9–2	5–6	8–7	16–2	—	3–7	9–3	6–2
1	Sweden	7–3	9–1	10–2	9–1	10–2	9–2	7–3	—	7–2	8–0
7	Ukraine	9–6	4–6	3–8	4–9	3–8	12–2	3–9	2–7	—	2–6

Group C Round Robin Summary Table
Pos.	Country	Australia	Austria	England	Hungary	Luxembourg	Mexico	Scotland	Slovakia	Switzerland	Record
4	Australia	—	11–2	8–2	4–6	6–4	13–4	3–9	7–4	2–9	5–3
5	Austria	2–11	—	8–2	1–10	W–L	8–1	6–11	7–5	2–7	4–4
8	England	2–8	2–8	—	5–6	9–3	3–8	4–13	2–8	4–8	1–7
3	Hungary	6–4	10–1	6–5	—	8–1	10–3	3–9	7–2	6–10	6–2
9	Luxembourg	4–6	L–W	3–9	1–8	—	6–7	3–8	3–11	0–11	0–8
7	Mexico	4–13	1–8	8–3	3–10	7–6	—	1–8	4–9	3–10	2–6
2	Scotland	9–3	11–6	13–4	9–3	8–3	8–1	—	8–2	6–9	7–1
6	Slovakia	4–7	5–7	8–2	2–7	11–3	9–4	2–8	—	4–6	3–5
1	Switzerland	9–2	7–2	8–4	10–6	11–0	10–3	9–6	6–4	—	8–0

Group D Round Robin Summary Table
Pos.	Country	Croatia	Estonia	Germany	Italy	Netherlands	Spain	United States	Wales	Record
8	Croatia	—	5–4	1–17	4–7	4–12	1–9	1–9	3–12	1–6
6	Estonia	4–5	—	7–8	5–11	5–4	1–10	6–9	10–7	2–5
1	Germany	17–1	8–7	—	8–5	9–3	7–6	7–4	11–2	7–0
3	Italy	7–4	11–5	5–8	—	7–6	4–9	9–5	6–4	5–2
7	Netherlands	12–4	4–5	3–9	6–7	—	2–6	7–10	4–6	1–6
2	Spain	9–1	10–1	6–7	9–4	6–2	—	8–6	8–7	6–1
5	United States	9–1	9–6	4–7	5–9	10–7	6–8	—	3–6	3–4
4	Wales	12–3	7–10	2–11	4–6	6–4	7–8	6–3	—	3–4

== Round-robin results ==
All draw times are listed in British Summer Time (UTC+01:00).

=== Draw 1 ===
Saturday, October 15, 8:00

Sheet A	1	2	3	4	5	6	7	8	Final
Scotland (Bryce) 🔨	3	0	0	2	2	1	1	X	9
Hungary (Tatár)	0	2	1	0	0	0	0	X	3

Sheet C	1	2	3	4	5	6	7	8	Final
Portugal (Ribau) 🔨	2	0	0	0	2	4	X	X	8
Slovenia (Sever)	0	0	1	0	0	0	X	X	1

Sheet E	1	2	3	4	5	6	7	8	Final
Switzerland (Hegner)	0	0	2	0	2	3	0	X	7
Austria (Higatzberger) 🔨	0	0	0	1	0	0	1	X	2

Sheet B	1	2	3	4	5	6	7	8	Final
Hong Kong (Chang) 🔨	1	0	1	0	1	0	0	X	3
Finland (Sipilä)	0	1	0	3	0	1	1	X	6

Sheet D	1	2	3	4	5	6	7	8	Final
India (Raju) 🔨	0	0	0	0	0	1	X	X	1
South Korea (Kim)	1	4	1	5	1	0	X	X	12

Sheet F	1	2	3	4	5	6	7	8	Final
New Zealand (Fotti)	0	0	2	0	0	0	X	X	2
Denmark (Qvist) 🔨	2	2	0	2	1	1	X	X	8

=== Draw 2 ===
Saturday, October 15, 12:00

Sheet A	1	2	3	4	5	6	7	8	Final
Czech Republic (Hradec) 🔨	0	2	0	3	2	1	1	X	9
Ireland (Wilson)	1	0	1	0	0	0	0	X	2

Sheet D	1	2	3	4	5	6	7	8	Final
Italy (Pimpini) 🔨	0	3	2	1	0	1	0	0	7
Netherlands (Bomas)	3	0	0	0	1	0	1	1	6

Sheet F	1	2	3	4	5	6	7	8	Final
Croatia (Skendrović)	0	0	1	0	2	0	X	X	3
Wales (Meikle) 🔨	4	3	0	3	0	2	X	X	12

Sheet B	1	2	3	4	5	6	7	8	Final
United States (Pulli) 🔨	2	1	0	2	0	0	1	0	6
Spain (Vez)	0	0	2	0	3	1	0	2	8

Sheet E	1	2	3	4	5	6	7	8	Final
Latvia (Freidensons) 🔨	0	1	0	0	1	0	3	1	6
Chinese Taipei (Lee)	0	0	1	1	0	2	0	0	4

=== Draw 3 ===
Saturday, October 15, 16:00

Sheet A	1	2	3	4	5	6	7	8	Final
New Zealand (Fotti)	0	1	0	1	0	1	X	X	3
Canada (Ménard) 🔨	2	0	6	0	2	0	X	X	10

Sheet C	1	2	3	4	5	6	7	8	Final
England (Spain) 🔨	0	0	1	0	1	0	0	X	2
Austria (Higatzberger)	1	0	0	2	0	3	2	X	8

Sheet E	1	2	3	4	5	6	7	8	Final
South Korea (Kim) 🔨	0	2	2	0	1	0	3	X	8
Slovenia (Sever)	2	0	0	1	0	1	0	X	4

Sheet B	1	2	3	4	5	6	7	8	Final
Mexico (Tompkins)	1	3	2	0	0	0	1	0	7
Luxembourg (Benoy) 🔨	0	0	0	1	2	2	0	1	6

Sheet D	1	2	3	4	5	6	7	8	Final
Australia (Millikin)	0	1	1	0	0	0	X	X	2
Switzerland (Hegner) 🔨	1	0	0	3	2	3	X	X	9

Sheet F	1	2	3	4	5	6	7	8	Final
Scotland (Bryce) 🔨	2	0	0	2	3	0	1	X	8
Slovakia (Gallo)	0	0	1	0	0	1	0	X	2

=== Draw 4 ===
Saturday, October 15, 20:00

Sheet A	1	2	3	4	5	6	7	8	Final
Croatia (Skendrović)	0	1	0	0	0	0	X	X	1
Germany (Totzek) 🔨	5	0	5	3	3	1	X	X	17

Sheet C	1	2	3	4	5	6	7	8	Final
Nigeria (Woods III)	1	2	0	1	0	1	3	2	10
Chinese Taipei (Lee) 🔨	0	0	4	0	4	0	0	0	8

Sheet F	1	2	3	4	5	6	7	8	Final
Czech Republic (Hradec)	1	0	0	0	0	0	0	X	1
Sweden (Westman) 🔨	0	2	1	1	1	2	2	X	9

Sheet B	1	2	3	4	5	6	7	8	Final
Ukraine (Nikolov)	0	0	0	2	0	2	0	X	4
Japan (Tsuchiya) 🔨	1	2	1	0	2	0	3	X	9

Sheet D	1	2	3	4	5	6	7	8	9	Final
Norway (Lindström) 🔨	2	0	1	0	0	2	2	0	1	8
Latvia (Freidensons)	0	4	0	2	0	0	0	1	0	7

=== Draw 5 ===
Sunday, October 16, 8:00

Sheet A	1	2	3	4	5	6	7	8	9	Final
Slovenia (Sever) 🔨	2	1	0	2	0	0	1	0	0	6
India (Raju)	0	0	1	0	1	1	0	3	1	7

Sheet C	1	2	3	4	5	6	7	8	Final
Canada (Ménard) 🔨	0	1	0	1	0	0	1	X	3
Finland (Sipilä)	1	0	1	0	1	2	0	X	5

Sheet E	1	2	3	4	5	6	7	8	Final
Mexico (Tompkins)	0	0	1	0	0	3	0	X	4
Australia (Millikin) 🔨	2	2	0	2	3	0	4	X	13

Sheet B	1	2	3	4	5	6	7	8	Final
Hungary (Tatár) 🔨	0	1	0	3	1	1	1	X	7
Slovakia (Gallo)	1	0	1	0	0	0	0	X	2

Sheet D	1	2	3	4	5	6	7	8	Final
Luxembourg (Benoy)	0	1	0	1	0	1	X	X	3
Scotland (Bryce) 🔨	3	0	2	0	3	0	X	X	8

Sheet F	1	2	3	4	5	6	7	8	Final
Switzerland (Hegner) 🔨	3	1	0	0	2	0	2	X	8
England (Spain)	0	0	1	1	0	2	0	X	4

=== Draw 6 ===
Sunday, October 16, 12:00

Sheet B	1	2	3	4	5	6	7	8	Final
Ireland (Wilson)	0	1	0	0	0	1	0	X	2
Sweden (Westman) 🔨	2	0	0	3	2	0	3	X	10

Sheet D	1	2	3	4	5	6	7	8	Final
Japan (Tsuchiya) 🔨	5	0	0	1	0	1	2	X	9
Czech Republic (Hradec)	0	1	0	0	1	0	0	X	2

Sheet F	1	2	3	4	5	6	7	8	Final
Latvia (Freidensons) 🔨	3	4	3	2	0	3	1	X	16
Nigeria (Woods III)	0	0	0	0	3	0	0	X	3

Sheet C	1	2	3	4	5	6	7	8	Final
Germany (Totzek) 🔨	2	0	0	0	2	2	0	1	7
Spain (Vez)	0	1	1	2	0	0	2	0	6

Sheet E	1	2	3	4	5	6	7	8	Final
Ukraine (Nikolov) 🔨	0	0	1	1	0	1	X	X	3
Norway (Lindström)	1	3	0	0	5	0	X	X	9

=== Draw 7 ===
Sunday, October 16, 16:00

Sheet A	1	2	3	4	5	6	7	8	Final
Austria (Higatzberger)	0	0	0	2	0	0	X	X	2
Australia (Millikin) 🔨	0	1	3	0	4	3	X	X	11

Sheet C	1	2	3	4	5	6	7	8	Final
Hungary (Tatár)	2	0	2	1	1	2	X	X	8
Luxembourg (Benoy) 🔨	0	1	0	0	0	0	X	X	1

Sheet E	1	2	3	4	5	6	7	8	Final
Hong Kong (Chang) 🔨	2	1	1	0	3	0	0	X	7
India (Raju)	0	0	0	2	0	1	1	X	4

Sheet B	1	2	3	4	5	6	7	8	Final
Canada (Ménard) 🔨	1	1	2	3	0	1	X	X	8
Denmark (Qvist)	0	0	0	0	1	0	X	X	1

Sheet D	1	2	3	4	5	6	7	8	Final
Finland (Sipilä) 🔨	4	4	0	3	3	1	X	X	15
New Zealand (Fotti)	0	0	1	0	0	0	X	X	1

Sheet F	1	2	3	4	5	6	7	8	9	Final
South Korea (Kim) 🔨	0	0	1	0	2	0	1	0	2	6
Portugal (Ribau)	1	0	0	1	0	1	0	1	0	4

=== Draw 8 ===
Sunday, October 16, 20:00

Sheet A	1	2	3	4	5	6	7	8	Final
Chinese Taipei (Lee)	0	3	1	0	0	0	1	0	5
Norway (Lindström) 🔨	3	0	0	0	2	0	0	1	6

Sheet C	1	2	3	4	5	6	7	8	Final
Ireland (Wilson)	0	0	2	0	2	0	0	X	4
Japan (Tsuchiya) 🔨	1	1	0	2	0	3	1	X	8

Sheet E	1	2	3	4	5	6	7	8	Final
United States (Pulli) 🔨	2	0	1	0	1	0	1	0	5
Italy (Pimpini)	0	3	0	3	0	2	0	1	9

Sheet B	1	2	3	4	5	6	7	8	Final
Germany (Totzek) 🔨	2	1	0	5	3	0	X	X	11
Wales (Meikle)	0	0	1	0	0	1	X	X	2

Sheet D	1	2	3	4	5	6	7	8	Final
Spain (Vez) 🔨	3	1	3	1	0	1	X	X	9
Croatia (Skendrović)	0	0	0	0	1	0	X	X	1

Sheet F	1	2	3	4	5	6	7	8	Final
Netherlands (Bomas) 🔨	0	2	0	0	1	0	0	1	4
Estonia (Vlassov)	0	0	2	1	0	1	1	0	5

=== Draw 9 ===
Monday, October 17, 8:00

Sheet A	1	2	3	4	5	6	7	8	9	Final
Canada (Ménard) 🔨	0	0	3	0	2	0	1	0	1	7
South Korea (Kim)	0	1	0	2	0	1	0	2	0	6

Sheet C	1	2	3	4	5	6	7	8	Final
Slovakia (Gallo) 🔨	0	0	1	0	0	4	1	3	9
Mexico (Tompkins)	0	0	0	3	1	0	0	0	4

Sheet E	1	2	3	4	5	6	7	8	Final
Finland (Sipilä)	0	3	0	0	3	0	2	X	8
Denmark (Qvist) 🔨	1	0	0	1	0	2	0	X	4

Sheet B	1	2	3	4	5	6	7	8	Final
New Zealand (Fotti)	0	2	0	2	0	1	0	X	5
Portugal (Ribau) 🔨	4	0	2	0	2	0	1	X	9

Sheet D	1	2	3	4	5	6	7	8	Final
Hong Kong (Chang)	0	4	0	0	1	0	0	X	5
Slovenia (Sever) 🔨	5	0	2	1	0	1	2	X	11

Sheet F	1	2	3	4	5	6	7	8	Final
England (Spain)	0	0	1	0	1	0	0	X	2
Australia (Millikin) 🔨	1	1	0	2	0	1	3	X	8

=== Draw 10 ===
Monday, October 17, 12:00

Sheet A	1	2	3	4	5	6	7	8	Final
Ireland (Wilson)	1	0	0	0	2	1	0	1	5
Latvia (Freidensons) 🔨	0	2	2	2	0	0	1	0	7

Sheet C	1	2	3	4	5	6	7	8	Final
Wales (Meikle)	0	2	0	0	1	0	1	2	6
United States (Pulli) 🔨	1	0	0	1	0	1	0	0	3

Sheet E	1	2	3	4	5	6	7	8	Final
Japan (Tsuchiya)	0	0	0	0	0	1	X	X	1
Sweden (Westman) 🔨	2	1	3	1	2	0	X	X	9

Sheet B	1	2	3	4	5	6	7	8	Final
Czech Republic (Hradec) 🔨	1	2	0	3	2	3	0	X	11
Nigeria (Woods III)	0	0	1	0	0	0	1	X	2

Sheet D	1	2	3	4	5	6	7	8	Final
Ukraine (Nikolov)	0	4	0	4	0	1	0	X	9
Chinese Taipei (Lee) 🔨	1	0	1	0	2	0	2	X	6

Sheet F	1	2	3	4	5	6	7	8	Final
Estonia (Vlassov)	0	2	0	1	0	2	0	X	5
Italy (Pimpini) 🔨	2	0	3	0	2	0	4	X	11

=== Draw 11 ===
Monday, October 17, 16:00

Sheet A	1	2	3	4	5	6	7	8	Final
Hungary (Tatár)	0	1	0	1	1	3	0	0	6
Switzerland (Hegner) 🔨	0	0	3	0	0	0	5	2	10

Sheet C	1	2	3	4	5	6	7	8	Final
Denmark (Qvist) 🔨	4	1	2	3	4	0	X	X	14
Hong Kong (Chang)	0	0	0	0	0	1	X	X	1

Sheet E	1	2	3	4	5	6	7	8	Final
Luxembourg (Benoy)	2	0	0	0	1	0	0	X	3
Slovakia (Gallo) 🔨	0	5	2	1	0	1	2	X	11

Sheet B	1	2	3	4	5	6	7	8	Final
Scotland (Bryce) 🔨	5	0	4	4	0	0	X	X	13
England (Spain)	0	1	0	0	1	2	X	X	4

Sheet D	1	2	3	4	5	6	7	8	Final
Mexico (Tompkins)	0	0	0	1	0	0	0	X	1
Austria (Higatzberger) 🔨	1	2	1	0	1	1	2	X	8

Sheet F	1	2	3	4	5	6	7	8	9	Final
Portugal (Ribau) 🔨	0	2	0	3	0	0	3	0	0	8
India (Raju)	1	0	1	0	1	3	0	2	1	9

=== Draw 12 ===
Monday, October 17, 20:00

Sheet A	1	2	3	4	5	6	7	8	Final
Germany (Totzek) 🔨	2	0	2	0	3	2	X	X	9
Netherlands (Bomas)	0	2	0	1	0	0	X	X	3

Sheet C	1	2	3	4	5	6	7	8	Final
Sweden (Westman) 🔨	2	0	3	0	2	0	X	X	7
Ukraine (Nikolov)	0	0	0	1	0	1	X	X	2

Sheet F	1	2	3	4	5	6	7	8	Final
Nigeria (Woods III)	0	1	0	0	1	0	0	X	2
Norway (Lindström) 🔨	2	0	4	5	0	3	2	X	16

Sheet B	1	2	3	4	5	6	7	8	Final
Croatia (Skendrović)	0	0	1	0	1	0	2	1	5
Estonia (Vlassov) 🔨	2	1	0	0	0	1	0	0	4

Sheet E	1	2	3	4	5	6	7	8	9	Final
Spain (Vez)	0	0	0	3	0	0	0	4	1	8
Wales (Meikle) 🔨	2	0	2	0	1	1	1	0	0	7

=== Draw 13 ===
Tuesday, October 18, 8:00

Sheet A	1	2	3	4	5	6	7	8	Final
United States (Pulli)	1	0	1	2	3	2	X	X	9
Croatia (Skendrović) 🔨	0	1	0	0	0	0	X	X	1

Sheet C	1	2	3	4	5	6	7	8	Final
Spain (Vez)	1	2	0	3	3	1	X	X	10
Estonia (Vlassov) 🔨	0	0	1	0	0	0	X	X	1

Sheet E	1	2	3	4	5	6	7	8	Final
Czech Republic (Hradec)	2	1	0	1	0	0	4	X	8
Latvia (Freidensons) 🔨	0	0	1	0	3	0	0	X	4

Sheet B	1	2	3	4	5	6	7	8	Final
Italy (Pimpini) 🔨	0	0	2	0	2	0	1	X	5
Germany (Totzek)	1	1	0	3	0	3	0	X	8

Sheet D	1	2	3	4	5	6	7	8	Final
Nigeria (Woods III) 🔨	1	0	0	0	0	0	1	X	2
Ukraine (Nikolov)	0	1	4	2	2	3	0	X	12

=== Draw 14 ===
Tuesday, October 18, 12:00

Sheet A	1	2	3	4	5	6	7	8	Final
Hong Kong (Chang)	1	0	0	4	2	4	X	X	11
New Zealand (Fotti) 🔨	0	1	2	0	0	0	X	X	3

Sheet C	1	2	3	4	5	6	7	8	Final
Finland (Sipilä) 🔨	0	3	0	0	0	2	3	X	8
Portugal (Ribau)	0	0	3	1	0	0	0	X	4

Sheet E	1	2	3	4	5	6	7	8	Final
Scotland (Bryce)	0	0	3	2	0	1	0	0	6
Switzerland (Hegner) 🔨	2	3	0	0	1	0	1	2	9

Sheet B	1	2	3	4	5	6	7	8	Final
India (Raju)	0	1	0	0	1	0	0	X	2
Canada (Ménard) 🔨	3	0	1	3	0	0	2	X	9

Sheet D	1	2	3	4	5	6	7	8	Final
England (Spain)	0	0	2	0	1	0	X	X	3
Mexico (Tompkins) 🔨	3	1	0	2	0	2	X	X	8

Sheet F	1	2	3	4	5	6	7	8	Final
Denmark (Qvist)	1	1	0	2	1	2	X	X	7
Slovenia (Sever) 🔨	0	0	1	0	0	0	X	X	1

=== Draw 15 ===
Tuesday, October 18, 16:00

Sheet A	1	2	3	4	5	6	7	8	Final
Ukraine (Nikolov) 🔨	0	2	0	1	0	1	0	0	4
Czech Republic (Hradec)	3	0	0	0	1	0	1	1	6

Sheet C	1	2	3	4	5	6	7	8	Final
Japan (Tsuchiya) 🔨	4	4	0	1	0	2	0	X	11
Nigeria (Woods III)	0	0	2	0	3	0	1	X	6

Sheet E	1	2	3	4	5	6	7	8	Final
Croatia (Skendrović)	0	2	0	0	2	0	X	X	4
Netherlands (Bomas) 🔨	5	0	2	3	0	2	X	X	12

Sheet B	1	2	3	4	5	6	7	8	Final
Norway (Lindström) 🔨	0	3	0	2	3	1	X	X	9
Ireland (Wilson)	1	0	1	0	0	0	X	X	2

Sheet D	1	2	3	4	5	6	7	8	Final
Estonia (Vlassov) 🔨	1	0	0	0	1	0	4	0	6
United States (Pulli)	0	1	3	1	0	2	0	2	9

Sheet F	1	2	3	4	5	6	7	8	Final
Sweden (Westman) 🔨	3	1	0	0	0	2	1	X	7
Chinese Taipei (Lee)	0	0	2	1	0	0	0	X	3

=== Draw 16 ===
Tuesday, October 18, 20:00

Sheet A	1	2	3	4	5	6	7	8	Final
Mexico (Tompkins)	0	0	0	0	0	1	X	X	1
Scotland (Bryce) 🔨	1	2	1	2	2	0	X	X	8

Sheet C	1	2	3	4	5	6	7	8	Final
Luxembourg (Benoy)	0	0	0	1	0	2	0	X	3
England (Spain) 🔨	1	3	3	0	1	0	1	X	9

Sheet E	1	2	3	4	5	6	7	8	Final
New Zealand (Fotti)	0	0	0	0	0	0	X	X	0
South Korea (Kim) 🔨	4	1	2	4	3	1	X	X	15

Sheet B	1	2	3	4	5	6	7	8	Final
Australia (Millikin)	0	1	0	2	1	0	0	X	4
Hungary (Tatár) 🔨	2	0	2	0	0	1	1	X	6

Sheet D	1	2	3	4	5	6	7	8	Final
Portugal (Ribau)	0	0	0	0	0	1	0	X	1
Hong Kong (Chang) 🔨	1	1	2	1	2	0	3	X	10

Sheet F	1	2	3	4	5	6	7	8	9	Final
Slovakia (Gallo) 🔨	0	0	2	0	2	0	0	1	0	5
Austria (Higatzberger)	1	0	0	1	0	2	1	0	2	7

=== Draw 17 ===
Wednesday, October 19, 8:00

Sheet A	1	2	3	4	5	6	7	8	Final
Italy (Pimpini)	0	1	0	0	3	0	X	X	4
Spain (Vez) 🔨	2	0	3	1	0	3	X	X	9

Sheet D	1	2	3	4	5	6	7	8	Final
Sweden (Westman)	0	1	1	0	4	0	1	X	7
Norway (Lindström) 🔨	0	0	0	2	0	1	0	X	3

Sheet F	1	2	3	4	5	6	7	8	Final
Germany (Totzek) 🔨	0	2	2	0	0	3	0	X	7
United States (Pulli)	1	0	0	1	1	0	1	X	4

Sheet C	1	2	3	4	5	6	7	8	Final
Netherlands (Bomas)	1	0	0	0	3	0	0	X	4
Wales (Meikle) 🔨	0	2	1	1	0	1	1	X	6

Sheet E	1	2	3	4	5	6	7	8	Final
Nigeria (Woods III)	0	0	0	0	1	0	1	X	2
Ireland (Wilson) 🔨	1	2	0	2	0	1	0	X	6

=== Draw 18 ===
Wednesday, October 19, 12:00

Sheet A	1	2	3	4	5	6	7	8	Final
Australia (Millikin)	0	1	2	0	2	0	0	1	6
Luxembourg (Benoy) 🔨	1	0	0	1	0	1	1	0	4

Sheet C	1	2	3	4	5	6	7	8	Final
Switzerland (Hegner)	0	2	1	0	2	0	0	1	6
Slovakia (Gallo) 🔨	0	0	0	2	0	1	1	0	4

Sheet E	1	2	3	4	5	6	7	8	Final
Portugal (Ribau)	0	1	0	1	1	0	1	X	4
Canada (Ménard) 🔨	0	0	3	0	0	4	0	X	7

Sheet B	1	2	3	4	5	6	7	8	Final
Austria (Higatzberger)	0	3	0	0	0	3	0	X	6
Scotland (Bryce) 🔨	2	0	5	2	1	0	1	X	11

Sheet D	1	2	3	4	5	6	7	8	Final
Denmark (Qvist)	0	2	2	3	1	1	X	X	9
India (Raju) 🔨	1	0	0	0	0	0	X	X	1

Sheet F	1	2	3	4	5	6	7	8	Final
Hungary (Tatár) 🔨	1	0	4	0	1	0	4	X	10
Mexico (Tompkins)	0	1	0	1	0	1	0	X	3

=== Draw 19 ===
Wednesday, October 19, 16:00

Sheet A	1	2	3	4	5	6	7	8	Final
Norway (Lindström) 🔨	2	0	1	1	0	1	0	0	5
Japan (Tsuchiya)	0	0	0	0	3	0	2	1	6

Sheet C	1	2	3	4	5	6	7	8	Final
Latvia (Freidensons)	0	2	0	0	0	0	X	X	2
Sweden (Westman) 🔨	3	0	0	0	4	3	X	X	10

Sheet E	1	2	3	4	5	6	7	8	9	Final
Estonia (Vlassov) 🔨	0	3	0	2	0	1	0	1	0	7
Germany (Totzek)	2	0	1	0	2	0	2	0	1	8

Sheet B	1	2	3	4	5	6	7	8	Final
Chinese Taipei (Lee)	1	0	0	0	1	0	0	X	2
Czech Republic (Hradec) 🔨	0	3	1	3	0	1	1	X	9

Sheet D	1	2	3	4	5	6	7	8	Final
Wales (Meikle) 🔨	0	1	0	0	1	1	1	0	4
Italy (Pimpini)	1	0	2	2	0	0	0	1	6

Sheet F	1	2	3	4	5	6	7	8	Final
Ireland (Wilson) 🔨	0	2	1	0	3	2	0	X	8
Ukraine (Nikolov)	0	0	0	2	0	0	1	X	3

=== Draw 20 ===
Wednesday, October 19, 20:00

Sheet A	1	2	3	4	5	6	7	8	Final
India (Raju)	1	0	1	0	0	0	X	X	2
Finland (Sipilä) 🔨	0	3	0	2	2	1	X	X	8

Sheet C	1	2	3	4	5	6	7	8	Final
South Korea (Kim)	0	2	0	1	0	0	1	0	4
Denmark (Qvist) 🔨	2	0	0	0	2	1	0	1	6

Sheet E	1	2	3	4	5	6	7	8	Final
England (Spain) 🔨	1	0	0	0	2	0	1	1	5
Hungary (Tatár)	0	0	1	1	0	4	0	0	6

Sheet B	1	2	3	4	5	6	7	8	Final
Slovenia (Sever)	1	0	4	5	1	1	X	X	12
New Zealand (Fotti) 🔨	0	1	0	0	0	0	X	X	1

Sheet D	1	2	3	4	5	6	7	8	Final
Slovakia (Gallo)	0	0	1	1	0	0	2	X	4
Australia (Millikin) 🔨	4	1	0	0	1	1	0	X	7

Sheet F	1	2	3	4	5	6	7	8	Final
Canada (Ménard) 🔨	0	2	0	2	4	0	X	X	8
Hong Kong (Chang)	1	0	1	0	0	1	X	X	3

=== Draw 21 ===
Thursday, October 20, 8:00

Sheet A	1	2	3	4	5	6	7	8	Final
Sweden (Westman) 🔨	4	0	2	1	0	0	2	X	9
Nigeria (Woods III)	0	1	0	0	0	1	0	X	2

Sheet C	1	2	3	4	5	6	7	8	9	Final
Norway (Lindström)	1	1	2	0	1	0	0	0	1	6
Czech Republic (Hradec) 🔨	0	0	0	2	0	1	1	1	0	5

Sheet F	1	2	3	4	5	6	7	8	Final
Japan (Tsuchiya) 🔨	0	0	0	1	0	0	1	X	2
Latvia (Freidensons)	2	1	1	0	1	1	0	X	6

Sheet B	1	2	3	4	5	6	7	8	Final
Netherlands (Bomas)	0	0	5	0	0	2	0	0	7
United States (Pulli) 🔨	1	1	0	2	2	0	2	2	10

Sheet D	1	2	3	4	5	6	7	8	Final
Chinese Taipei (Lee)	0	0	3	0	0	0	2	X	5
Ireland (Wilson) 🔨	0	1	0	0	4	2	0	X	7

=== Draw 22 ===
Thursday, October 20, 12:00

Sheet A	1	2	3	4	5	6	7	8	Final
Slovakia (Gallo) 🔨	2	0	1	2	0	3	X	X	8
England (Spain)	0	1	0	0	1	0	X	X	2

Sheet C	1	2	3	4	5	6	7	8	Final
Australia (Millikin)	0	0	0	1	1	1	0	X	3
Scotland (Bryce) 🔨	2	1	5	0	0	0	1	X	9

Sheet E	1	2	3	4	5	6	7	8	Final
Slovenia (Sever)	0	0	0	2	0	0	0	X	2
Finland (Sipilä) 🔨	0	3	0	0	0	1	1	X	5

Sheet B	1	2	3	4	5	6	7	8	Final
South Korea (Kim)	1	0	2	0	0	1	1	0	5
Hong Kong (Chang) 🔨	0	1	0	2	1	0	0	2	6

Sheet D	1	2	3	4	5	6	7	8	Final
Austria (Higatzberger)	0	0	0	0	0	1	X	X	1
Hungary (Tatár) 🔨	0	4	3	2	1	0	X	X	10

Sheet F	1	2	3	4	5	6	7	8	Final
Luxembourg (Benoy)	0	0	0	0	0	0	X	X	0
Switzerland (Hegner) 🔨	3	3	1	1	1	2	X	X	11

=== Draw 23 ===
Thursday, October 20, 16:00

Sheet A	1	2	3	4	5	6	7	8	Final
Denmark (Qvist)	0	0	1	0	1	2	1	1	6
Portugal (Ribau) 🔨	0	1	0	4	0	0	0	0	5

Sheet C	1	2	3	4	5	6	7	8	Final
Italy (Pimpini) 🔨	0	1	1	1	1	0	3	X	7
Croatia (Skendrović)	3	0	0	0	0	1	0	X	4

Sheet F	1	2	3	4	5	6	7	8	Final
Spain (Vez) 🔨	3	0	0	0	1	1	1	X	6
Netherlands (Bomas)	0	1	1	0	0	0	0	X	2

Sheet B	1	2	3	4	5	6	7	8	Final
Latvia (Freidensons) 🔨	4	1	1	0	1	1	0	X	8
Ukraine (Nikolov)	0	0	0	1	0	0	2	X	3

Sheet E	1	2	3	4	5	6	7	8	Final
Chinese Taipei (Lee)	0	1	0	0	1	0	X	X	2
Japan (Tsuchiya) 🔨	1	0	5	1	0	5	X	X	12

=== Draw 24 ===
Thursday, October 20, 20:00

Sheet A	1	2	3	4	5	6	7	8	Final
Wales (Meikle)	0	2	0	3	0	2	0	0	7
Estonia (Vlassov) 🔨	4	0	1	0	3	0	1	1	10

Sheet C	1	2	3	4	5	6	7	8	Final
India (Raju) 🔨	0	2	1	1	1	0	1	X	6
New Zealand (Fotti)	2	0	0	0	0	1	0	X	3

Sheet E	Final
Austria (Higatzberger) 🔨	W
Luxembourg (Benoy)	L

Sheet B	1	2	3	4	5	6	7	8	Final
Switzerland (Hegner)	0	3	2	2	0	3	X	X	10
Mexico (Tompkins) 🔨	1	0	0	0	2	0	X	X	3

Sheet D	1	2	3	4	5	6	7	8	Final
Slovenia (Sever)	0	1	0	0	1	0	X	X	2
Canada (Ménard) 🔨	3	0	5	1	0	3	X	X	12

Sheet F	1	2	3	4	5	6	7	8	Final
Finland (Sipilä)	0	1	1	0	0	1	0	X	3
South Korea (Kim) 🔨	2	0	0	2	1	0	2	X	7

== Playoffs ==
Qualification games
8	Japan	7
9	Denmark	4
5	Canada	9
12	Italy	5
6	Scotland	6
11	Hungary	4
7	Spain	6
10	Norway	7

Quarterfinals
1	Switzerland	6
8	Japan	5
4	Finland	6
5	Canada	9
3	Germany	5
6	Scotland	6
2	Sweden	8
10	Norway	3

Semifinals
1	Switzerland	4
5	Canada	9
6	Scotland	6
2	Sweden	5

Gold medal game
5	Canada	7
6	Scotland	4
Bronze medal game
1	Switzerland	6
2	Sweden	4

=== Qualification games ===
Friday, October 21, 10:00

Sheet A	1	2	3	4	5	6	7	8	Final
Japan (Tsuchiya) 🔨	0	1	0	3	1	0	1	1	7
Denmark (Qvist)	2	0	1	0	0	1	0	0	4

Sheet B	1	2	3	4	5	6	7	8	Final
Canada (Ménard)	0	3	0	1	0	3	2	X	9
Italy (Pimpini) 🔨	1	0	3	0	1	0	0	X	5

Sheet E	1	2	3	4	5	6	7	8	Final
Scotland (Bryce) 🔨	2	0	1	1	1	0	0	1	6
Hungary (Tatár)	0	1	0	0	0	2	1	0	4

Sheet F	1	2	3	4	5	6	7	8	9	Final
Spain (Vez)	0	2	0	0	0	0	1	3	0	6
Norway (Lindström) 🔨	1	0	0	3	1	1	0	0	1	7

=== Quarterfinals ===
Friday, October 21, 18:00

Sheet A	1	2	3	4	5	6	7	8	Final
Germany (Totzek)	0	2	0	1	0	1	0	1	5
Scotland (Bryce) 🔨	2	0	2	0	1	0	1	0	6

Sheet B	1	2	3	4	5	6	7	8	Final
Switzerland (Hegner) 🔨	1	0	0	2	0	3	0	0	6
Japan (Tsuchiya)	0	0	2	0	1	0	1	1	5

Sheet E	1	2	3	4	5	6	7	8	Final
Sweden (Westman) 🔨	1	0	4	2	1	0	X	X	8
Norway (Lindström)	0	1	0	0	0	2	X	X	3

Sheet F	1	2	3	4	5	6	7	8	9	Final
Finland (Sipilä) 🔨	1	0	0	1	0	1	0	3	0	6
Canada (Ménard)	0	2	0	0	2	0	2	0	3	9

=== Semifinals ===
Saturday, October 22, 9:30

Sheet B	1	2	3	4	5	6	7	8	9	Final
Scotland (Bryce)	0	0	1	1	2	1	0	0	1	6
Sweden (Westman) 🔨	3	0	0	0	0	0	1	1	0	5

Sheet E	1	2	3	4	5	6	7	8	Final
Switzerland (Hegner)	0	2	0	0	2	0	X	X	4
Canada (Ménard) 🔨	0	0	3	1	0	5	X	X	9

=== Bronze medal game ===
Saturday, October 22, 14:30

Sheet D	1	2	3	4	5	6	7	8	Final
Switzerland (Hegner) 🔨	1	1	0	1	0	2	1	0	6
Sweden (Westman)	0	0	1	0	2	0	0	1	4

=== Gold medal game ===
Saturday, October 22, 14:30

Sheet C	1	2	3	4	5	6	7	8	Final
Scotland (Bryce)	0	3	1	0	0	0	0	X	4
Canada (Ménard) 🔨	2	0	0	2	1	1	1	X	7

== Final standings ==
Place	Team
1st place, gold medalist(s)	Canada
2nd place, silver medalist(s)	Scotland
3rd place, bronze medalist(s)	Switzerland
4	Sweden
5	Germany
5	Finland
5	Japan
5	Norway
9	Denmark
9	Hungary
9	Italy
9	Spain

Place	Team
13	South Korea
14	Australia
15	Czech Republic
16	Wales
17	Latvia
18	United States
19	Hong Kong
20	Austria
21	Estonia
22	Slovakia
23	Ireland
24	India

Place	Team
25	Portugal
26	Mexico
27	Netherlands
28	Ukraine
29	England
30	Slovenia
31	Nigeria
32	Croatia
33	Chinese Taipei
34	New Zealand
35	Luxembourg
