= Lotta Immonen =

Finnish curler (born 1996)

- Curler
- Born: 22 March 1996 (age 30)

Team
- Curling club: Kisakallio Curling Club
- Mixed doubles partner: Markus Sipilä

Curling career
- Member Association: Finland
- World Championship: 1 (2019)
- World Mixed Doubles Championship: 3 (2022, 2025, 2026)
- World Mixed Championship: 3 (2018, 2019, 2022)
- European Championship: 3 (2016, 2017, 2018)
- Other appearances: European Junior Challenge: 1 (2015)
Medal record
Curling
Finnish Women's Championship
Gold medal – first place	2018
Gold medal – first place	2019
Finnish Mixed Doubles Championship
Gold medal – first place	2022
Gold medal – first place	2023

Lotta Immonen (born 22 March 1996) is a Finnish curler. She is a two-time Finnish women's champion (2018, 2019), five-time Finnish mixed curling champion (2018, 2019, 2020, 2022, 2023) and two-time Finnish mixed doubles champion (2022, 2023).

== Teams ==
=== Women's ===
Season	Skip	Third	Second	Lead	Alternate	Coach	Events
2013–14	Mira Lehtonen	Noora Suuripää	Iiris Koilahti	Emilia Koskinen	Lotta Immonen		FJCC 2014 (5th)
2014–15	Mira Lehtonen	Lotta Immonen	Iiris Koilahti	Noora Suuripää	Emilia Koskinen (EJCC)	Tero Tähtinen	FJCC 2015 (bronze); EJCC 2015 (12th)
2015–16	Mira Lehtonen	Lotta Immonen	Iiris Koilahti	Moa Norell	Noora Suuripää		FWCC 2016 (4th)
2015–16	Mira Lehtonen	Lotta Immonen	Iiris Koilahti	Noora Suuripää	Moa Norell	Leo Mäkelä	FJCC 2016 (silver)
2016–17	Anne Malmi	Eszter Juhász	Tiina Suuripää	Lotta Immonen	Tuire Autio	Olavi Malmi	ECC 2016 (10th)
2016–17	Anne Malmi	Tuire Autio	Sari Auvinen	Lotta Immonen	Noora Suuripää, Tiina Suuripää		FWCC 2017 (silver)
2016–17	Oona Kauste	Lotta Immonen	Eszter Juhász	Maija Salmiovirta			ACup 2017 (7th)
2017–18	Oona Kauste	Eszter Juhász	Maija Salmiovirta	Jenni Räsänen	Lotta Immonen	Leo Mäkelä	ECC 2017 (11th)
2017–18	Oona Kauste	Lotta Immonen	Eszter Juhász	Jenni Räsänen	Maija Salmiovirta		FWCC 2018 (gold)
2018–19	Oona Kauste	Lotta Immonen	Eszter Juhász	Sanna Piilo	Jenni Räsänen, Maija Salmiovirta	Aku Kauste	FWCC 2019 (gold)
2018–19	Oona Kauste	Eszter Juhász	Maija Salmiovirta	Lotta Immonen	Elina Virtaala (ECC); Marjo Hippi (WCC)	Aku Kauste	ECC 2018 (9th); WCC 2019 (12th)

=== Mixed ===
Season	Skip	Third	Second	Lead	Coach	Events
2014–15	Tero Tähtinen	Ari Lehtonen	Lotta Immonen	Virpi Hukka		FMxCC 2015 (8th)
2016–17	Markus Sipilä	Lotta Immonen	Leo Ouni	Tiina Suuripää		FMxCC 2017 (bronze)
2017–18	Markus Sipilä	Lotta Immonen	Leo Ouni	Tiina Suuripää		FMxCC 2018 (gold)
2018–19	Markus Sipilä	Lotta Immonen	Leo Ouni	Tiina Suuripää		WMxCC 2018 (13th); FMxCC 2019 (gold)
2019–20	Markus Sipilä	Lotta Immonen	Leo Ouni	Tiina Suuripää	Paavo Kuosmanen	WMxCC 2019 (20th) FMxCC 2020 (gold)
2021–22	Markus Sipilä	Lotta Immonen	Iikko Säntti	Tiina Suuripää		WMxCC 2022 (5th) FMxCC 2022 (gold)
2022–23	Markus Sipilä	Lotta Immonen	Leo Ouni	Tiina Suuripää		FMxCC 2023 (gold)

=== Mixed doubles ===
Season	Male	Female	Events
2015–16	Tero Tähtinen	Lotta Immonen	FMDCC 2016 (6th)
2016–17	Iikko Säntti	Lotta Immonen	FMDCC 2017 (5th)
2017–18	Iikko Säntti	Lotta Immonen	FMDCC 2018 (bronze)
2021-22	Markus Sipilä	Lotta Immonen	FMDCC 2022 (gold)
2022-23	Markus Sipilä	Lotta Immonen	FMDCC 2023 (gold)
2024–25	Markus Sipilä	Lotta Immonen	FMDCC 2025 (silver); WMDCC 2025 (10th)
2025–26	Markus Sipilä	Lotta Immonen	FMDCC 2026 (gold); WMDCC 2026 (17th)
