= Heidi Hossi =

Finnish curler

- Curler ♀
- Born: 2 March 1988 (age 38)

Curling career
- Member Association: Finland
- World Championship: 1 (2015)
- European Championship: 5 (2005, 2011, 2012, 2013, 2014)
- Other appearances: European Junior Challenge: 4 (2005, 2006, 2007, 2008)
Medal record
Curling
Finnish Women's Championship
| Gold medal – first place | 2011 |
| Gold medal – first place | 2012 |
| Gold medal – first place | 2013 |
| Gold medal – first place | 2014 |
| Gold medal – first place | 2015 |
| Silver medal – second place | 2005 |
| Silver medal – second place | 2006 |
| Silver medal – second place | 2007 |
| Silver medal – second place | 2010 |
| Bronze medal – third place | 2008 |
| Bronze medal – third place | 2016 |
European Junior Challenge
| Gold medal – first place | 2006 Prague |

Heidi Hossi (born 2 March 1988) is a Finnish curler.

At the national level, she is a five-time Finnish women's champion (2011, 2012, 2013, 2014, 2015) and a four-time junior champion (2005, 2006, 2007, 2008).

== Teams ==
=== Women's ===
| Season | Skip | Third | Second | Lead | Alternate | Coach | Events |
|---|---|---|---|---|---|---|---|
| 2003–04 | Katja Kiiskinen | Heidi Hossi | ? | ? | | | FWCC 2004 (5th) |
| 2004–05 | Katja Kiiskinen | Heidi Hossi | Tiina Holmi | Sanna Puustinen | Päivi Salonen | | FWCC 2005 (silver) |
| 2004–05 | Tiina Holmi | Sanna Puustinen | Päivi Salonen | Heidi Hossi | | | FJCC 2005 (gold) |
| 2004–05 | Katja Kiiskinen | Sanna Puustinen | Heidi Hossi | Tiina Holmi | Päivi Salonen | Paavo Kuosmanen | EJCC 2005 (4th) |
| 2005–06 | Katja Kiiskinen (fourth) | Päivi Salonen (skip) | Tiina Holmi | Heidi Hossi | Sanna Puustinen | Tuomas Vuori | ECC 2005 (10th) |
| 2005–06 | Katja Kiiskinen | Heidi Hossi | Tiina Holmi | Kirsi Nykänen | Sanna Puustinen, Päivi Salonen | | FWCC 2006 (silver) |
| 2005–06 | Tiina Holmi | Sanna Puustinen | Päivi Salonen | Heidi Hossi | | | FJCC 2006 (gold) |
| 2005–06 | Päivi Salonen | Heidi Hossi | Tiina Holmi | Sanna Puustinen | Oona Kauste | Katja Kiiskinen | EJCC 2006 (silver) |
| 2006–07 | Katja Kiiskinen | Tiina Holmi | Heidi Hossi | Sanna Puustinen | Päivi Salonen | | FWCC 2007 (silver) |
| 2006–07 | Tiina Holmi | Oona Kauste | Heidi Hossi | Päivi Salonen | Sanna Puustinen | Katja Kiiskinen | FJCC 2007 (gold) |
| 2006–07 | Päivi Salonen (fourth) | Sanna Puustinen | Heidi Hossi | Tiina Holmi (skip) | Oona Kauste | Katja Kiiskinen | EJCC 2007 (5th) |
| 2007–08 | Katja Kiiskinen | Tiina Holmi | Päivi Salonen | Oona Kauste | Sanna Puustinen, Heidi Hossi | | FWCC 2008 (bronze) |
| 2007–08 | Tiina Holmi | Oona Kauste | Heidi Hossi | Sanna Puustinen | Päivi Salonen | | FJCC 2008 (gold) |
| 2007–08 | Päivi Salonen (fourth) | Heidi Hossi | Oona Kauste | Sanna Puustinen (skip) | Tiina Holmi | Aku Kauste | EJCC 2008 (5th) |
| 2009–10 | Tiina Holmi | Sanna Puustinen | Heidi Hossi | Oona Kauste | Eszter Juhász | | FWCC 2010 (silver) |
| 2010–11 | Tiina Holmi | Heidi Hossi | Oona Kauste | Sanna Puustinen | Eszter Juhász | | FWCC 2011 (gold) |
| 2011–12 | Sanna Puustinen (fourth) | Heidi Hossi | Oona Kauste (skip) | Eszter Juhász | Marjo Hippi | | ECC 2011 (12th) |
| 2011–12 | Oona Kauste | Marjo Hippi | Heidi Hossi | Sanna Puustinen | Eszter Juhász | | FWCC 2012 (gold) |
| 2012–13 | Anne Malmi | Oona Kauste | Heidi Hossi | Marjo Hippi | Tiina Suuripää | Sanna Puustinen, Tomi Rantamäki | ECC 2012 (10th) |
| 2012–13 | Anne Malmi | Sanna Puustinen | Heidi Hossi | Marjo Hippi | Sari Auvinen, Oona Kauste | | FWCC 2013 (gold) |
| 2013–14 | Sanna Puustinen | Heidi Hossi | Oona Kauste | Marjo Hippi | Maija Salmiovirta | Perttu Piilo | ECC 2013 (11th) |
| 2013–14 | Sanna Puustinen | Heidi Hossi | Oona Kauste | Maija Salmiovirta | Marjo Hippi | Perttu Piilo | FWCC 2014 (gold) |
| 2014–15 | Sanna Puustinen | Heidi Hossi | Oona Kauste | Marjo Hippi | Maija Salmiovirta | Perttu Piilo | ECC 2014 (6th); WCC 2015 (11th) |
| 2014–15 | Sanna Puustinen | Maija Salmiovirta | Oona Kauste | Marjo Hippi | Heidi Hossi | Perttu Piilo | FWCC 2015 (gold) |
| 2015–16 | Oona Kauste | Milja Hellsten | Marjo Hippi | Heidi Hossi | Jenni Räsänen, Maija Salmiovirta | Tomi Rantamäki | FWCC 2016 (bronze) |

=== Mixed ===
| Season | Skip | Third | Second | Lead | Alternate | Coach | Events |
|---|---|---|---|---|---|---|---|
| 2009–10 | Toni Sepperi | Jere Sullanmaa | Heidi Hossi | Eszter Juhász | | Jarmo Kalilainen | FMxCC 2010 (silver) |
| 2010–11 | Toni Sepperi | Jere Sullanmaa | Heidi Hossi | Eszter Juhász | Jussi Knuutinen | | FMxCC 2011 (7th) |
| 2011–12 | Tomi Rantamäki | Heidi Hossi | Juha Pääjärvi | Marjo Hippi | | | FMxCC 2012 (bronze) |
| 2012–13 | Perttu Piilo | Sanna Puustinen | Heidi Hossi | Pauli Jäämies | | | FMxCC 2013 (bronze) |
| 2013–14 | Perttu Piilo | Sanna Puustinen | Heidi Hossi | Kimmo Ilvonen | | | FMxCC 2014 (bronze) |

=== Mixed doubles ===
| Season | Male | Female | Events |
|---|---|---|---|
| 2012–13 | Pauli Jäämies | Heidi Hossi | FMDCC 2013 (5th) |
| 2013–14 | Kimmo Ilvonen | Heidi Hossi | FMDCC 2014 (6th) |
| 2014–15 | Kimmo Ilvonen | Heidi Hossi | FMDCC 2015 (7th) |
