= Katja Kiiskinen =

Finnish curler and coach

- Curler ♀
- Born: 10 October 1983 (age 43)

Team
- Curling club: Hyvinkää CC

Curling career
- Member Association: Finland
- World Mixed Doubles Championship: 3 (2011, 2013, 2015)
- European Championship: 5 (2002, 2005, 2007, 2009, 2010)
- Other appearances: European Mixed Championship: 1 (2010), European Junior Challenge: 1 (2005)
Medal record
Curling
Finnish Women's Championship
Gold medal – first place	2003
Gold medal – first place	2010
Silver medal – second place	2005
Silver medal – second place	2006
Silver medal – second place	2007
Silver medal – second place	2011
Silver medal – second place	2014
Silver medal – second place	2015
Bronze medal – third place	2008
Bronze medal – third place	2013

Katja Kiiskinen (born 10 October 1983) is a Finnish curler and curling coach.

At the national level, she is a two-time Finnish women's champion curler (2003, 2010), three-time Finnish mixed doubles champion curler (2011, 2013, 2015), 2010 Finnish mixed champion curler.

== Teams ==
=== Women's ===
Season	Skip	Third	Second	Lead	Alternate	Coach	Events
2002–03	Kirsi Nykänen	Tiina Kautonen	Sari Laakkonen	Minna Malinen	Katja Kiiskinen, Laura Tsutsunen (FWCC)		ECC 2002 (9th), FWCC 2003 (gold)
2003–04	Katja Kiiskinen	Heidi Hossi	?	?			FWCC 2004 (5th)
2004–05	Katja Kiiskinen	Heidi Hossi	Tiina Holmi	Sanna Puustinen	Päivi Salonen		FWCC 2005 (silver)
2004–05	Katja Kiiskinen	Sanna Puustinen	Heidi Hossi	Tiina Holmi	Päivi Salonen	Paavo Kuosmanen	EJCC 2005 (4th)
2005–06	Katja Kiiskinen (fourth)	Päivi Salonen (skip)	Tiina Holmi	Heidi Hossi	Sanna Puustinen	Tuomas Vuori	ECC 2005 (10th)
2005–06	Katja Kiiskinen	Heidi Hossi	Tiina Holmi	Kirsi Nykänen	Sanna Puustinen, Päivi Salonen		FWCC 2006 (silver)
2006–07	Katja Kiiskinen	Tiina Holmi	Heidi Hossi	Sanna Puustinen	Päivi Salonen		FWCC 2007 (silver)
2007–08	Anne Malmi	Sari Auvinen	Katri Määttä	Tuire Autio	Katja Kiiskinen	Jaana Jokela	ECC 2007 (10th)
2007–08	Katja Kiiskinen	Tiina Holmi	Päivi Salonen	Oona Kauste	Sanna Puustinen, Heidi Hossi		FWCC 2008 (bronze)
2009–10	Ellen Vogt	Katja Kiiskinen	Riikka Louhivuori	Elisa Alatalo	Oona Kauste	Aku Kauste	ECC 2009 (8th)
2009–10	Ellen Vogt	Elisa Westerberg	Katja Kiiskinen	Hannele Liesmäki	Riikka Louhivuori, Tiina Suuripää	Aku Kauste	FWCC 2010 (gold)
2010–11	Ellen Vogt	Katja Kiiskinen	Riikka Louhivuori	Elisa Westerberg	Tiina Suuripää	Toni Sepperi	ECC 2010 (9th)
2010–11	Ellen Vogt	Katja Kiiskinen	Riikka Louhivuori	Maija Salmiovirta	Tiina Suuripää, Elisa Westerberg		FWCC 2011 (silver)
2011–12	Katja Kiiskinen	Elisa Westerberg	Milja Sullanmaa	Lare Norri	Anna Majapuro, Eeva Haapanen		FWCC 2012 (4th)
2012–13	Katja Kiiskinen	Milja Sullanmaa	Jenni Räsänen	Nina Sipilä	Hanna Männynväli		FWCC 2013 (bronze)
2013–14	Katja Kiiskinen	Milja Sullanmaa	Jenni Räsänen	Nina Sipilä	Hanna Männynväli, Tiina Suuripää		FWCC 2014 (silver)
2014–15	Milja Sullanmaa	Tiina Suuripää	Jenni Räsänen	Hanna Männynväli	Jenni Sullanmaa, Katja Kiiskinen		FWCC 2015 (silver)

=== Mixed ===
Season	Skip	Third	Second	Lead	Alternate	Events
2006–07	Tomi Rantamäki	Kirsi Nykänen	Kalle Kiiskinen	Tiina Julkunen	Katja Kiiskinen, Jermu Pöllänen	FMxCC 2007 (silver)
2009–10	Tomi Rantamäki	Katja Kiiskinen	Bettina Mandelin	Juha Pekaristo		FMxCC 2010 (gold)
2010–11	Tomi Rantamäki	Katja Kiiskinen	Kimmo Ilvonen	Marjo Hippi		EMxCC 2010 (15th)
2010–11	Toni Anttila	Katja Kiiskinen	Tiina Suuripää	Kasper Hakunti		FMxCC 2011 (bronze)
2011–12	Katja Kiiskinen	Toni Sepperi	Jere Sullanmaa	Milja Sullanmaa	Arttu Pietilä	FMxCC 2012 (silver)
2012–13	Jussi Uusipaavalniemi	Jaana Hämäläinen	Paavo Kuosmanen	Kirsi Kaski	Katja Kiiskinen	FMxCC 2013 (5th)
2013–14	Jussi Uusipaavalniemi	Paavo Kuosmanen	Jaana Hämäläinen	Katja Kiiskinen		FMxCC 2014 (silver)
2014–15	Pauli Jäämies	Katja Kiiskinen	Antti Männynväli	Hanna Männynväli		FMxCC 2015 (bronze)

=== Mixed doubles ===
Season	Male	Female	Coach	Events
2007–08	Kalle Kiiskinen	Katja Kiiskinen		FMDCC 2008 (6th)
2009–10	Paavo Kuosmanen	Katja Kiiskinen		FMDCC 2010 (4th)
2010–11	Kalle Kiiskinen	Katja Kiiskinen		FMDCC 2011 (gold); WMDCC 2011 (9th)
2011–12	Kalle Kiiskinen	Katja Kiiskinen	Paavo Kuosmanen	FMDCC 2012 (bronze)
2012–13	Kalle Kiiskinen	Katja Kiiskinen		FMDCC 2013 (gold)
2012–13	Paavo Kuosmanen	Katja Kiiskinen	Kalle Kiiskinen	WMDCC 2013 (18th)
2013–14	Kalle Kiiskinen	Katja Kiiskinen		FMDCC 2014 (5th)
2014–15	Kalle Kiiskinen	Katja Kiiskinen	Paavo Kuosmanen (WMDCC)	FMDCC 2015 (gold); WMDCC 2015 (14th)

== Record as a coach of national teams ==
Year	Tournament, event	National team	Place
2006	2006 European Junior Curling Challenge	Finland (junior women)	2nd place, silver medalist(s)
2007	2007 European Junior Curling Challenge	Finland (junior women)	5
2009	2009 European Junior Curling Challenge	Finland (junior women)	5
2014	2014 European Curling Championships	Belarus (women)	19
2015	2015 European Junior Curling Challenge	Spain (junior men)	2nd place, silver medalist(s)
2015	Curling at the 2015 Winter Universiade	Spain (junior men)	10
2019	2019 European Curling Championships	Finland (women)	16
2020	2020 World Qualification Event	Finland (women)	6

== Personal life ==
Her brother Kalle Kiiskinen is also a curler and curling coach, he is a silver medallist of 2006 Winter Olympics.

She started curling in 2000 at the age of 17.
