= Teemu Salo =

Finnish curler

Medal record

Curling

Winter Olympics
Silver medal – second place	2006 Turin	

European Mixed Curling Championship
Gold medal – first place	2005 Andorra	

Teemu Salo (born 11 February 1974) is a Finnish curler from Hyvinkää. He has played lead position for Markku Uusipaavalniemi since 2002. Salo won a silver medal as a member of Uusipaavaliemi's team at the 2006 Winter Olympics.

He won a gold medal at the 2005 European Mixed Curling Championship playing second for Uusipaavalniemi.

In 2009, he played for Kalle Kiiskinen at the World Curling Championships.

== Teams ==
Event	Skip	Third	Second	Lead	Alternate	Result
1995 WJCC	Perttu Piilo	Teemu Salo	Kalle Kiiskinen	Paavo Kuosmanen	Riko Raunio	9th (2–7)
2005 EMxCC	Markku Uusipaavalniemi	Kirsi Nykänen	Teemu Salo	Tiina Kautonen		1st (7–1)
2006 Olympic Winter Games	Markku Uusipaavalniemi	Wille Mäkelä	Kalle Kiiskinen	Teemu Salo	Jani Sullanmaa	2nd (8–3)
2009 WCC	Kalle Kiiskinen	Jani Sullanmaa	Teemu Salo	Jari Rouvinen	Juha Pekaristo	12th (1–10)
