= 2026 World Mixed Doubles Curling Championship =

2026 edition of the World Mixed Doubles Curling Championship

- Host city: Geneva, Switzerland
- Arena: Geneva Sous-Moulin Sports Center
- Dates: April 25 – May 2
- Winner: Australia
- Female: Tahli Gill
- Male: Dean Hewitt
- Coach: Perry Marshall
- Finalist: Sweden (Westman / Ahlberg)

The 2026 World Mixed Doubles Curling Championship (branded as the 2026 ACE & Company World Mixed Doubles Curling Championship for sponsorship reasons) was held from April 25 to May 2 at the Geneva Sous-Moulin Sports Center in Geneva, Switzerland. The event was held alongside the 2026 World Senior Curling Championships.

== Qualification ==
The following nations qualified to participate in the 2026 World Mixed Doubles Curling Championship:

Means of Qualification	Vacancies	Qualified
2025 World Mixed Doubles Curling Championship	16	Italy; Scotland; Australia; Estonia; United States; Canada; Sweden; Norway; New Zealand; Finland; Switzerland; South Korea; Japan; Germany; Denmark; Czech Republic
2026 World Mixed Doubles Qualification Event	4	Netherlands; Hungary; France; China
TOTAL	20	

== Teams ==
The teams are listed as follows:

Australia	Canada	China	Czech Republic
Female: Tahli Gill; Male: Dean Hewitt	Female: Kadriana Lott; Male: Colton Lott	Female: Han Yu; Male: Yu Sen	Female: Petra Klímová; Male: Lukáš Klíma
Denmark	Estonia	Finland	France
Female: Karolina Jensen; Male: Alexander Qvist	Female: Marie Kaldvee; Male: Harri Lill	Female: Lotta Immonen; Male: Markus Sipilä	Female: Stéphanie Barbarin; Male: Wilfrid Coulot
Germany	Hungary	Italy	Japan
Female: Kim Sutor; Male: Sixten Totzek	Female: Dorottya Udvardi-Palancsa; Male: Lőrinc Tatár	Female: Stefania Constantini; Male: Amos Mosaner	Female: Tori Koana; Male: Go Aoki
Netherlands	New Zealand	Norway	Scotland
Female: Lisenka Bomas; Male: Wouter Gösgens	Female: Jessica Smith; Male: Ben Smith	Female: Eilin Kjærland; Male: Mathias Brænden	Female: Katie McMillan; Male: Angus Bryce
South Korea	Sweden	Switzerland	United States
Female: Kim Seon-yeong; Male: Jeong Yeong-seok	Female: Therese Westman; Male: Robin Ahlberg	Female: Stefanie Berset; Male: Philipp Hösli	Female: Rachel Kawleski; Male: Connor Kauffman

== Round robin standings ==
Final Round Robin Standings

Key
Teams to Playoffs
Teams to Relegation Playoff
Teams relegated to Qualification Event

Group A	Athletes	W	L	W–L	PF	PA	EW	EL	BE	SE	S%	DSC
Australia	Tahli Gill / Dean Hewitt	8	1	–	74	47	38	30	0	11	83.3%	25.431
Sweden	Therese Westman / Robin Ahlberg	7	2	1–0	83	48	43	25	0	16	82.2%	20.419
Japan	Tori Koana / Go Aoki	7	2	0–1	75	36	39	24	0	18	81.7%	23.313
Estonia	Marie Kaldvee / Harri Lill	6	3	–	59	56	34	35	0	9	76.8%	17.531
Norway	Eilin Kjærland / Mathias Brænden	4	5	2–0	55	56	35	40	0	8	74.9%	28.644
China	Han Yu / Yu Sen	4	5	1–1	54	65	31	35	0	8	72.5%	30.200
Netherlands	Lisenka Bomas / Wouter Gösgens	4	5	0–2	48	64	35	34	0	8	68.3%	24.388
New Zealand	Jessica Smith / Ben Smith	3	6	–	49	76	25	39	0	4	63.7%	31.719
France	Stéphanie Barbarin / Wilfrid Coulot	1	8	1–0	45	76	27	40	0	5	71.9%	42.956
Denmark	Karolina Jensen / Alexander Qvist	1	8	0–1	57	75	32	37	0	12	66.4%	33.769

Group B	Athletes	W	L	W–L	PF	PA	EW	EL	BE	SE	S%	DSC
Canada	Kadriana Lott / Colton Lott	8	1	–	67	45	39	28	1	12	82.6%	29.544
Italy	Stefania Constantini / Amos Mosaner	7	2	–	73	44	37	30	0	14	81.2%	23.450
Scotland	Katie McMillan / Angus Bryce	6	3	–	74	52	35	31	0	11	78.5%	24.369
Switzerland	Stefanie Berset / Philipp Hösli	5	4	1–0	66	53	36	31	0	13	75.7%	22.031
South Korea	Kim Seon-yeong / Jeong Yeong-seok	5	4	0–1	60	55	35	31	0	11	78.1%	36.181
Czech Republic	Petra Klímová / Lukáš Klíma	4	5	1–0	57	58	32	35	0	4	74.9%	23.163
Germany	Kim Sutor / Sixten Totzek	4	5	0–1	57	57	33	35	0	6	71.8%	34.306
Hungary	Dorottya Udvardi-Palancsa / Lőrinc Tatár	3	6	–	53	65	36	35	0	7	74.9%	31.400
Finland	Lotta Immonen / Markus Sipilä	2	7	–	45	64	28	36	0	10	69.0%	32.406
United States	Rachel Kawleski / Connor Kauffman	1	8	–	34	93	20	39	0	3	55.9%	47.756

Group A Round Robin Summary Table
Pos.	Country	Australia	China	Denmark	Estonia	France	Japan	Netherlands	New Zealand	Norway	Sweden	Record
1	Australia	—	12–4	11–8	8–6	7–2	7–5	5–7	10–4	6–5	8–6	8–1
6	China	4–12	—	9–6	6–5	8–4	3–9	8–3	4–10	7–8	5–8	4–5
10	Denmark	8–11	6–9	—	7–10	5–8	3–12	5–7	11–4	6–7	6–7	1–8
4	Estonia	6–8	5–6	10–7	—	8–4	0–9	8–6	8–4	7–6	7–6	6–3
9	France	2–7	4–8	8–5	4–8	—	5–10	4–6	6–9	6–8	6–15	1–8
3	Japan	5–7	9–3	12–3	9–0	10–5	—	9–3	11–1	6–4	4–10	7–2
7	Netherlands	7–5	3–8	7–5	6–8	6–4	3–9	—	9–8	4–6	3–11	4–5
8	New Zealand	4–10	10–4	4–11	4–8	9–6	1–11	8–9	—	6–5	3–12	3–6
5	Norway	5–6	8–7	7–6	6–7	8–6	4–6	6–4	5–6	—	6–8	4–5
2	Sweden	6–8	8–5	7–6	6–7	15–6	10–4	11–3	12–3	8–6	—	7–2

Group B Round Robin Summary Table
Pos.	Country	Canada	Czech Republic	Finland	Germany	Hungary	Italy	Scotland	South Korea	Switzerland	United States	Record
1	Canada	—	6–5	10–4	7–4	10–7	6–5	5–8	6–4	10–5	7–3	8–1
6	Czech Republic	5–6	—	8–5	10–5	4–9	5–7	2–9	10–4	2–7	11–6	4–5
9	Finland	4–10	5–8	—	4–6	5–4	2–9	7–8	2–7	5–8	11–4	2–7
7	Germany	4–7	5–10	6–4	—	5–6	7–10	3–8	7–4	7–6	13–2	4–5
8	Hungary	7–10	9–4	4–5	6–5	—	4–9	5–11	5–7	7–6	6–8	3–6
2	Italy	5–6	7–5	9–2	10–7	9–4	—	10–8	5–7	8–4	10–1	7–2
3	Scotland	8–5	9–2	8-7	8-3	11–5	8–10	—	4–10	6–8	12–2	6–3
5	South Korea	4–6	4–10	7–2	4–7	7–5	7–5	10–4	—	6–10	11–6	5–4
4	Switzerland	5–10	7–2	8–5	6–7	6–7	4–8	8–6	10–6	—	12–2	5–4
10	United States	3–7	6–11	4–11	2–13	8–6	1–10	2–12	6–11	2–12	—	1–8

== Round robin results ==
All draw times are listed in Central European Summer Time (UTC+02:00).

=== Draw 1 ===
Saturday, April 25, 10:00 am

Sheet A	1	2	3	4	5	6	7	8	Final
Japan (Koana / Aoki) 🔨	3	1	2	1	1	1	X	X	9
Estonia (Kaldvee / Lill)	0	0	0	0	0	0	X	X	0

Sheet B	1	2	3	4	5	6	7	8	Final
Norway (Kjærland / Brænden)	3	0	1	0	1	0	1	0	6
Netherlands (Bomas / Gösgens) 🔨	0	1	0	1	0	1	0	1	4

Sheet C	1	2	3	4	5	6	7	8	Final
Denmark (Jensen / Qvist)	0	0	0	2	2	0	1	X	5
France (Barbarin / Coulot) 🔨	1	4	2	0	0	1	0	X	8

Sheet D	1	2	3	4	5	6	7	8	Final
New Zealand (Smith / Smith)	0	0	1	0	2	0	X	X	3
Sweden (Westman / Ahlberg) 🔨	4	4	0	1	0	3	X	X	12

Sheet E	1	2	3	4	5	6	7	8	Final
Australia (Gill / Hewitt) 🔨	3	3	0	1	0	5	X	X	12
China (Han / Yu)	0	0	1	0	3	0	X	X	4

=== Draw 2 ===
Saturday, April 25, 2:30 pm

Sheet A	1	2	3	4	5	6	7	8	Final
Finland (Immonen / Sipilä) 🔨	0	1	0	1	0	1	2	0	5
Hungary (Udvardi-Palancsa / Tatár)	1	0	1	0	1	0	0	1	4

Sheet B	1	2	3	4	5	6	7	8	Final
Switzerland (Berset / Hösli) 🔨	2	0	1	0	1	0	2	0	6
Germany (Sutor / Totzek)	0	1	0	1	0	2	0	3	7

Sheet C	1	2	3	4	5	6	7	8	Final
United States (Kawleski / Kauffman)	0	0	0	1	0	1	X	X	2
Scotland (McMillan / Bryce) 🔨	5	1	1	0	5	0	X	X	12

Sheet D	1	2	3	4	5	6	7	8	Final
Czech Republic (Klímová / Klíma)	0	2	0	0	2	0	1	X	5
Italy (Constantini / Mosaner) 🔨	2	0	2	1	0	2	0	X	7

Sheet E	1	2	3	4	5	6	7	8	Final
Canada (Lott / Lott) 🔨	3	0	1	1	0	1	0	0	6
South Korea (Kim / Jeong)	0	1	0	0	2	0	1	0	4

=== Draw 3 ===
Saturday, April 25, 7:00 pm

Sheet A	1	2	3	4	5	6	7	8	Final
Netherlands (Bomas / Gösgens) 🔨	2	0	2	1	0	3	1	0	9
New Zealand (Smith / Smith)	0	3	0	0	4	0	0	1	8

Sheet B	1	2	3	4	5	6	7	8	Final
Estonia (Kaldvee / Lill) 🔨	2	0	1	0	3	0	0	1	7
Sweden (Westman / Ahlberg)	0	1	0	1	0	3	1	0	6

Sheet C	1	2	3	4	5	6	7	8	Final
Australia (Gill / Hewitt)	1	2	0	0	0	2	0	2	7
Japan (Koana / Aoki) 🔨	0	0	1	1	1	0	2	0	5

Sheet D	1	2	3	4	5	6	7	8	Final
China (Han / Yu) 🔨	3	1	0	1	0	2	1	X	8
France (Barbarin / Coulot)	0	0	1	0	3	0	0	X	4

Sheet E	1	2	3	4	5	6	7	8	Final
Norway (Kjærland / Brænden) 🔨	1	0	0	0	4	0	0	2	7
Denmark (Jensen / Qvist)	0	1	1	1	0	2	1	0	6

=== Draw 4 ===
Sunday, April 26, 10:00 am

Sheet A	1	2	3	4	5	6	7	8	Final
Germany (Sutor / Totzek)	0	1	0	2	0	2	0	0	5
Czech Republic (Klímová / Klíma) 🔨	1	0	2	0	2	0	3	2	10

Sheet B	1	2	3	4	5	6	7	8	Final
Hungary (Udvardi-Palancsa / Tatár)	1	0	2	0	1	0	0	X	4
Italy (Constantini / Mosaner) 🔨	0	4	0	3	0	1	1	X	9

Sheet C	1	2	3	4	5	6	7	8	Final
Canada (Lott / Lott)	0	5	2	1	0	2	X	X	10
Finland (Immonen / Sipilä) 🔨	3	0	0	0	1	0	X	X	4

Sheet D	1	2	3	4	5	6	7	8	Final
South Korea (Kim / Jeong) 🔨	3	1	0	3	1	0	2	X	10
Scotland (McMillan / Bryce)	0	0	2	0	0	2	0	X	4

Sheet E	1	2	3	4	5	6	7	8	Final
Switzerland (Berset / Hösli) 🔨	3	3	3	1	0	2	X	X	12
United States (Kawleski / Kauffman)	0	0	0	0	2	0	X	X	2

=== Draw 5 ===
Sunday, April 26, 2:00 pm

Sheet A	1	2	3	4	5	6	7	8	Final
France (Barbarin / Coulot)	0	1	0	0	2	2	1	0	6
Norway (Kjærland / Brænden) 🔨	3	0	2	1	0	0	0	2	8

Sheet B	1	2	3	4	5	6	7	8	Final
Japan (Koana / Aoki) 🔨	3	3	0	1	0	2	0	X	9
China (Han / Yu)	0	0	1	0	1	0	1	X	3

Sheet C	1	2	3	4	5	6	7	8	Final
Estonia (Kaldvee / Lill)	0	3	1	2	1	1	0	X	8
New Zealand (Smith / Smith) 🔨	3	0	0	0	0	0	1	X	4

Sheet D	1	2	3	4	5	6	7	8	Final
Denmark (Jensen / Qvist)	2	1	0	0	1	0	4	0	8
Australia (Gill / Hewitt) 🔨	0	0	4	3	0	2	0	2	11

Sheet E	1	2	3	4	5	6	7	8	Final
Netherlands (Bomas / Gösgens)	0	1	0	0	2	0	0	X	3
Sweden (Westman / Ahlberg) 🔨	3	0	4	1	0	1	2	X	11

=== Draw 6 ===
Sunday, April 26, 7:00 pm

Sheet A	1	2	3	4	5	6	7	8	Final
Scotland (McMillan / Bryce)	2	0	1	0	1	2	0	0	6
Switzerland (Berset / Hösli) 🔨	0	3	0	1	0	0	3	1	8

Sheet B	1	2	3	4	5	6	7	8	Final
Finland (Immonen / Sipilä)	0	1	0	0	1	0	0	X	2
South Korea (Kim / Jeong) 🔨	3	0	1	1	0	1	1	X	7

Sheet C	1	2	3	4	5	6	7	8	Final
Hungary (Udvardi-Palancsa / Tatár)	0	2	3	0	2	0	2	X	9
Czech Republic (Klímová / Klíma) 🔨	1	0	0	1	0	2	0	X	4

Sheet D	1	2	3	4	5	6	7	8	Final
United States (Kawleski / Kauffman)	1	0	0	0	2	0	0	X	3
Canada (Lott / Lott) 🔨	0	1	1	2	0	2	1	X	7

Sheet E	1	2	3	4	5	6	7	8	Final
Germany (Sutor / Totzek)	1	0	0	4	0	2	0	0	7
Italy (Constantini / Mosaner) 🔨	0	2	1	0	4	0	2	1	10

=== Draw 7 ===
Monday, April 27, 10:00 am

Sheet A	1	2	3	4	5	6	7	8	Final
Sweden (Westman / Ahlberg)	1	0	2	0	1	0	2	0	6
Australia (Gill / Hewitt) 🔨	0	4	0	2	0	1	0	1	8

Sheet B	1	2	3	4	5	6	7	8	Final
Denmark (Jensen / Qvist)	0	1	0	1	0	2	1	6	11
New Zealand (Smith / Smith) 🔨	1	0	2	0	1	0	0	0	4

Sheet C	1	2	3	4	5	6	7	8	Final
China (Han / Yu) 🔨	0	0	2	2	1	0	3	X	8
Netherlands (Bomas / Gösgens)	1	1	0	0	0	1	0	X	3

Sheet D	1	2	3	4	5	6	7	8	Final
France (Barbarin / Coulot) 🔨	2	0	0	1	0	2	0	X	5
Japan (Koana / Aoki)	0	2	1	0	4	0	3	X	10

Sheet E	1	2	3	4	5	6	7	8	Final
Estonia (Kaldvee / Lill)	0	2	0	4	0	0	0	1	7
Norway (Kjærland / Brænden) 🔨	1	0	2	0	1	1	1	0	6

=== Draw 8 ===
Monday, April 27, 2:00 pm

Sheet A	1	2	3	4	5	6	7	8	9	Final
Italy (Constantini / Mosaner) 🔨	0	2	0	1	0	1	1	0	0	5
Canada (Lott / Lott)	1	0	2	0	1	0	0	1	1	6

Sheet B	1	2	3	4	5	6	7	8	Final
United States (Kawleski / Kauffman)	1	0	3	0	1	0	1	X	6
Czech Republic (Klímová / Klíma) 🔨	0	4	0	2	0	5	0	X	11

Sheet C	1	2	3	4	5	6	7	8	Final
South Korea (Kim / Jeong) 🔨	1	0	0	2	0	1	0	0	4
Germany (Sutor / Totzek)	0	2	1	0	2	0	1	1	7

Sheet D	1	2	3	4	5	6	7	8	Final
Scotland (McMillan / Bryce) 🔨	0	3	1	0	0	0	3	1	8
Finland (Immonen / Sipilä)	1	0	0	2	2	2	0	0	7

Sheet E	1	2	3	4	5	6	7	8	9	Final
Hungary (Udvardi-Palancsa / Tatár) 🔨	0	2	1	1	0	2	0	0	1	7
Switzerland (Berset / Hösli)	2	0	0	0	1	0	2	1	0	6

=== Draw 9 ===
Monday, April 27, 7:00 pm

Sheet A	1	2	3	4	5	6	7	8	Final
Denmark (Jensen / Qvist)	1	0	2	0	0	0	0	2	5
Netherlands (Bomas / Gösgens) 🔨	0	2	0	1	1	1	2	0	7

Sheet B	1	2	3	4	5	6	7	8	Final
Australia (Gill / Hewitt)	1	0	2	0	4	0	1	0	8
Estonia (Kaldvee / Lill) 🔨	0	2	0	1	0	1	0	2	6

Sheet C	1	2	3	4	5	6	7	8	Final
Japan (Koana / Aoki)	0	0	3	0	1	0	0	X	4
Sweden (Westman / Ahlberg) 🔨	5	1	0	1	0	1	2	X	10

Sheet D	1	2	3	4	5	6	7	8	9	Final
Norway (Kjærland / Brænden) 🔨	1	0	2	0	3	0	1	0	1	8
China (Han / Yu)	0	2	0	1	0	2	0	2	0	7

Sheet E	1	2	3	4	5	6	7	8	Final
New Zealand (Smith / Smith)	0	1	0	2	0	0	5	1	9
France (Barbarin / Coulot) 🔨	2	0	1	0	2	1	0	0	6

=== Draw 10 ===
Tuesday, April 28, 10:00 am

Sheet A	1	2	3	4	5	6	7	8	Final
United States (Kawleski / Kauffman)	0	0	1	0	1	0	X	X	2
Germany (Sutor / Totzek) 🔨	3	5	0	1	0	4	X	X	13

Sheet B	1	2	3	4	5	6	7	8	Final
Canada (Lott / Lott) 🔨	3	0	4	1	0	1	0	1	10
Hungary (Udvardi-Palancsa / Tatár)	0	4	0	0	1	0	2	0	7

Sheet C	1	2	3	4	5	6	7	8	Final
Finland (Immonen / Sipilä)	0	0	1	0	1	0	X	X	2
Italy (Constantini / Mosaner) 🔨	3	2	0	2	0	2	X	X	9

Sheet D	1	2	3	4	5	6	7	8	Final
Switzerland (Berset / Hösli) 🔨	1	0	5	3	0	0	1	X	10
South Korea (Kim / Jeong)	0	4	0	0	1	1	0	X	6

Sheet E	1	2	3	4	5	6	7	8	Final
Czech Republic (Klímová / Klíma) 🔨	0	1	0	0	1	0	0	X	2
Scotland (McMillan / Bryce)	1	0	3	1	0	2	2	X	9

=== Draw 11 ===
Tuesday, April 28, 2:00 pm

Sheet A	1	2	3	4	5	6	7	8	Final
Australia (Gill / Hewitt) 🔨	1	0	1	1	1	0	3	X	7
France (Barbarin / Coulot)	0	1	0	0	0	1	0	X	2

Sheet B	1	2	3	4	5	6	7	8	Final
Netherlands (Bomas / Gösgens) 🔨	1	0	0	1	0	1	0	X	3
Japan (Koana / Aoki)	0	2	3	0	2	0	2	X	9

Sheet C	1	2	3	4	5	6	7	8	Final
New Zealand (Smith / Smith) 🔨	0	0	2	2	0	1	1	0	6
Norway (Kjærland / Brænden)	1	1	0	0	2	0	0	1	5

Sheet D	1	2	3	4	5	6	7	8	Final
Sweden (Westman / Ahlberg) 🔨	0	3	0	1	1	0	2	0	7
Denmark (Jensen / Qvist)	2	0	1	0	0	2	0	1	6

Sheet E	1	2	3	4	5	6	7	8	Final
China (Han / Yu)	0	1	0	0	2	1	0	2	6
Estonia (Kaldvee / Lill) 🔨	1	0	2	1	0	0	1	0	5

=== Draw 12 ===
Tuesday, April 28, 7:00 pm

Sheet A	1	2	3	4	5	6	7	8	Final
Canada (Lott / Lott)	0	1	0	2	0	2	0	X	5
Scotland (McMillan / Bryce) 🔨	2	0	1	0	3	0	2	X	8

Sheet B	1	2	3	4	5	6	7	8	Final
Germany (Sutor / Totzek) 🔨	0	0	1	1	2	0	2	X	6
Finland (Immonen / Sipilä)	1	1	0	0	0	2	0	X	4

Sheet C	1	2	3	4	5	6	7	8	Final
Czech Republic (Klímová / Klíma) 🔨	1	0	0	0	1	0	0	X	2
Switzerland (Berset / Hösli)	0	1	1	2	0	2	1	X	7

Sheet D	1	2	3	4	5	6	7	8	Final
Italy (Constantini / Mosaner) 🔨	2	2	2	1	3	0	X	X	10
United States (Kawleski / Kauffman)	0	0	0	0	0	1	X	X	1

Sheet E	1	2	3	4	5	6	7	8	Final
South Korea (Kim / Jeong)	0	2	0	0	1	0	4	0	7
Hungary (Udvardi-Palancsa / Tatár) 🔨	1	0	1	1	0	1	0	1	5

=== Draw 13 ===
Wednesday, April 29, 10:00 am

Sheet A	1	2	3	4	5	6	7	8	9	Final
Norway (Kjærland / Brænden)	0	0	0	2	0	1	0	3	0	6
Sweden (Westman / Ahlberg) 🔨	2	1	1	0	1	0	1	0	2	8

Sheet B	1	2	3	4	5	6	7	8	Final
China (Han / Yu)	1	4	0	1	0	3	0	X	9
Denmark (Jensen / Qvist) 🔨	0	0	1	0	4	0	1	X	6

Sheet C	1	2	3	4	5	6	7	8	Final
France (Barbarin / Coulot)	0	1	0	2	0	1	0	0	4
Estonia (Kaldvee / Lill) 🔨	1	0	2	0	2	0	1	2	8

Sheet D	1	2	3	4	5	6	7	8	Final
Australia (Gill / Hewitt)	0	1	0	1	0	2	0	1	5
Netherlands (Bomas / Gösgens) 🔨	1	0	1	0	2	0	3	0	7

Sheet E	1	2	3	4	5	6	7	8	Final
Japan (Koana / Aoki) 🔨	1	2	0	4	1	3	X	X	11
New Zealand (Smith / Smith)	0	0	1	0	0	0	X	X	1

=== Draw 14 ===
Wednesday, April 29, 2:00 pm

Sheet A	1	2	3	4	5	6	7	8	Final
Switzerland (Berset / Hösli) 🔨	0	1	0	1	1	0	1	X	4
Italy (Constantini / Mosaner)	1	0	4	0	0	3	0	X	8

Sheet B	1	2	3	4	5	6	7	8	Final
South Korea (Kim / Jeong) 🔨	2	0	3	2	0	2	2	X	11
United States (Kawleski / Kauffman)	0	5	0	0	1	0	0	X	6

Sheet C	1	2	3	4	5	6	7	8	Final
Scotland (McMillan / Bryce) 🔨	5	0	2	0	3	0	1	X	11
Hungary (Udvardi-Palancsa / Tatár)	0	1	0	3	0	1	0	X	5

Sheet D	1	2	3	4	5	6	7	8	Final
Canada (Lott / Lott)	0	1	3	0	2	0	1	X	7
Germany (Sutor / Totzek) 🔨	2	0	0	1	0	1	0	X	4

Sheet E	1	2	3	4	5	6	7	8	Final
Finland (Immonen / Sipilä)	0	2	0	2	0	1	0	0	5
Czech Republic (Klímová / Klíma) 🔨	1	0	2	0	1	0	2	2	8

=== Draw 15 ===
Wednesday, April 29, 7:00 pm

Sheet A	1	2	3	4	5	6	7	8	Final
Estonia (Kaldvee / Lill) 🔨	0	0	3	1	0	3	1	2	10
Denmark (Jensen / Qvist)	2	3	0	0	2	0	0	0	7

Sheet B	1	2	3	4	5	6	7	8	Final
New Zealand (Smith / Smith) 🔨	0	1	0	3	0	0	X	X	4
Australia (Gill / Hewitt)	1	0	4	0	3	2	X	X	10

Sheet C	1	2	3	4	5	6	7	8	Final
Sweden (Westman / Ahlberg)	1	1	2	0	2	1	0	1	8
China (Han / Yu) 🔨	0	0	0	2	0	0	3	0	5

Sheet D	1	2	3	4	5	6	7	8	Final
Japan (Koana / Aoki) 🔨	1	1	0	0	1	0	2	1	6
Norway (Kjærland / Brænden)	0	0	1	2	0	1	0	0	4

Sheet E	1	2	3	4	5	6	7	8	Final
France (Barbarin / Coulot)	0	1	0	1	0	2	0	0	4
Netherlands (Bomas / Gösgens) 🔨	1	0	1	0	1	0	2	1	6

=== Draw 16 ===
Thursday, April 30, 10:00 am

Sheet A	1	2	3	4	5	6	7	8	Final
Hungary (Udvardi-Palancsa / Tatár) 🔨	0	1	0	2	0	2	1	0	6
United States (Kawleski / Kauffman)	1	0	2	0	3	0	0	2	8

Sheet B	1	2	3	4	5	6	7	8	9	Final
Czech Republic (Klímová / Klíma) 🔨	1	0	1	0	1	1	0	1	0	5
Canada (Lott / Lott)	0	1	0	1	0	0	3	0	1	6

Sheet C	1	2	3	4	5	6	7	8	Final
Italy (Constantini / Mosaner) 🔨	0	0	0	1	1	0	3	0	5
South Korea (Kim / Jeong)	1	1	1	0	0	1	0	3	7

Sheet D	1	2	3	4	5	6	7	8	Final
Finland (Immonen / Sipilä)	1	2	0	0	1	0	0	1	5
Switzerland (Berset / Hösli) 🔨	0	0	5	1	0	1	1	0	8

Sheet E	1	2	3	4	5	6	7	8	Final
Scotland (McMillan / Bryce) 🔨	2	2	0	2	0	2	0	X	8
Germany (Sutor / Totzek)	0	0	1	0	1	0	1	X	3

=== Draw 17 ===
Thursday, April 30, 2:00 pm

Sheet A	1	2	3	4	5	6	7	8	Final
New Zealand (Smith / Smith) 🔨	0	1	2	0	2	0	5	X	10
China (Han / Yu)	2	0	0	1	0	1	0	X	4

Sheet B	1	2	3	4	5	6	7	8	Final
Sweden (Westman / Ahlberg) 🔨	4	6	2	0	1	0	2	X	15
France (Barbarin / Coulot)	0	0	0	1	0	5	0	X	6

Sheet C	1	2	3	4	5	6	7	8	9	Final
Norway (Kjærland / Brænden) 🔨	0	2	1	0	1	0	0	1	0	5
Australia (Gill / Hewitt)	1	0	0	1	0	2	1	0	1	6

Sheet D	1	2	3	4	5	6	7	8	Final
Netherlands (Bomas / Gösgens) 🔨	1	0	2	0	1	0	2	0	6
Estonia (Kaldvee / Lill)	0	1	0	5	0	1	0	1	8

Sheet E	1	2	3	4	5	6	7	8	Final
Denmark (Jensen / Qvist) 🔨	0	0	2	0	0	1	0	X	3
Japan (Koana / Aoki)	3	3	0	1	2	0	3	X	12

=== Draw 18 ===
Thursday, April 30, 7:00 pm

Sheet A	1	2	3	4	5	6	7	8	Final
Czech Republic (Klímová / Klíma) 🔨	1	0	0	5	0	3	1	X	10
South Korea (Kim / Jeong)	0	1	1	0	2	0	0	X	4

Sheet B	1	2	3	4	5	6	7	8	9	Final
Italy (Constantini / Mosaner)	0	0	2	1	1	0	4	0	2	10
Scotland (McMillan / Bryce) 🔨	2	1	0	0	0	2	0	3	0	8

Sheet C	1	2	3	4	5	6	7	8	Final
Switzerland (Berset / Hösli)	0	0	2	0	3	0	0	X	5
Canada (Lott / Lott) 🔨	3	2	0	2	0	2	1	X	10

Sheet D	1	2	3	4	5	6	7	8	9	Final
Germany (Sutor / Totzek)	0	1	0	2	0	1	0	1	0	5
Hungary (Udvardi-Palancsa / Tatár) 🔨	1	0	1	0	1	0	2	0	1	6

Sheet E	1	2	3	4	5	6	7	8	Final
United States (Kawleski / Kauffman) 🔨	0	1	0	3	0	0	X	X	4
Finland (Immonen / Sipilä)	2	0	4	0	2	3	X	X	11

== Relegation playoff ==
Friday, May 1, 10:00 am

Sheet A	1	2	3	4	5	6	7	8	Final
New Zealand (Smith / Smith) 🔨	2	1	1	0	1	3	X	X	8
Finland (Immonen / Sipilä)	0	0	0	1	0	0	X	X	1

Player percentages
New Zealand		Finland	
Jessica Smith	91%	Lotta Immonen	75%
Ben Smith	85%	Markus Sipilä	38%
Total	87%	Total	60%

Sheet E	1	2	3	4	5	6	7	8	Final
Hungary (Udvardi-Palancsa / Tatár) 🔨	2	1	1	0	3	2	X	X	9
France (Barbarin / Coulot)	0	0	0	1	0	0	X	X	1

Player percentages
Hungary		France	
Dorottya Udvardi-Palancsa	88%	Stéphanie Barbarin	54%
Lőrinc Tatár	93%	Wilfrid Coulot	71%
Total	91%	Total	64%

== Playoffs ==
Qualification games
B2	Italy	7
A3	Japan	6
A2	Sweden	7
B3	Scotland	5

Semifinals
A1	Australia	7
B2	Italy	6
B1	Canada	4
A2	Sweden	6

Final
A1	Australia	8
A2	Sweden	4
Bronze medal game
B2	Italy	3
B1	Canada	11

=== Qualification Games ===
Friday, May 1, 10:00 am

Sheet B	1	2	3	4	5	6	7	8	Final
Sweden (Westman / Ahlberg) 🔨	4	0	2	0	0	1	0	X	7
Scotland (McMillan / Bryce)	0	2	0	1	0	0	2	X	5

Player percentages
Sweden		Scotland	
Therese Westman	84%	Katie McMillan	52%
Robin Ahlberg	82%	Angus Bryce	82%
Total	83%	Total	70%

Sheet D	1	2	3	4	5	6	7	8	9	Final
Italy (Constantini / Mosaner) 🔨	0	1	0	1	2	0	2	0	1	7
Japan (Koana / Aoki)	1	0	3	0	0	1	0	1	0	6

Player percentages
Italy		Japan	
Stefania Constantini	72%	Tori Koana	86%
Amos Mosaner	77%	Go Aoki	88%
Total	75%	Total	87%

=== Semifinals ===
Friday, May 1, 7:00 pm

Sheet B	1	2	3	4	5	6	7	8	9	Final
Australia (Gill / Hewitt) 🔨	1	0	0	0	3	0	2	0	1	7
Italy (Constantini / Mosaner)	0	2	1	1	0	1	0	1	0	6

Player percentages
Australia		Italy	
Tahli Gill	76%	Stefania Constantini	74%
Dean Hewitt	86%	Amos Mosaner	81%
Total	82%	Total	78%

Sheet D	1	2	3	4	5	6	7	8	Final
Canada (Lott / Lott) 🔨	1	0	1	0	0	2	0	X	4
Sweden (Westman / Ahlberg)	0	1	0	1	3	0	1	X	6

Player percentages
Canada		Sweden	
Kadriana Lott	82%	Therese Westman	89%
Colton Lott	85%	Robin Ahlberg	89%
Total	84%	Total	89%

=== Bronze medal game ===
Saturday, May 2, 10:00 am

Sheet C	1	2	3	4	5	6	7	8	Final
Italy (Constantini / Mosaner)	0	1	0	1	1	0	X	X	3
Canada (Lott / Lott) 🔨	4	0	3	0	0	4	X	X	11

Player percentages
Italy		Canada	
Stefania Constantini	69%	Kadriana Lott	85%
Amos Mosaner	63%	Colton Lott	92%
Total	65%	Total	89%

=== Final ===
Saturday, May 2, 2:00 pm

Sheet C	1	2	3	4	5	6	7	8	Final
Australia (Gill / Hewitt) 🔨	1	0	3	0	1	0	3	X	8
Sweden (Westman / Ahlberg)	0	1	0	2	0	1	0	X	4

Player percentages
Australia		Sweden	
Tahli Gill	91%	Therese Westman	85%
Dean Hewitt	90%	Robin Ahlberg	82%
Total	90%	Total	83%

== Statistics ==
=== Top 5 player percentages ===
Final Round Robin Percentages

Female	%
(Sweden) Therese Westman	82.6
(Japan) Tori Koana	82.4
(Canada) Kadriana Lott	81.0
(Scotland) Katie McMillan	80.5
(Australia) Tahli Gill	78.4

Male	%
(Australia) Dean Hewitt	86.5
(Italy) Amos Mosaner	84.3
(Canada) Colton Lott	83.6
(Sweden) Robin Ahlberg	82.0
(South Korea) Jeong Yeong-seok	80.6

== Final standings ==
Key
Teams relegated to 2026 World Mixed Doubles Qualification Event

Place	Team
1st place, gold medalist(s)	Australia
2nd place, silver medalist(s)	Sweden
3rd place, bronze medalist(s)	Canada
4	Italy
5	Japan
5	Scotland
7	Estonia
8	Switzerland
9	Norway
10	South Korea
11	Czech Republic
12	China
13	Netherlands
14	Germany
15	Hungary
15	New Zealand
17	Finland
17	France
19	Denmark
20	United States
