= Finnish Men's Curling Championship =

National Men's Curling Championship In Finland

The Finnish Men's Curling Championship is the national championship of men's curling in Finland. It has been held annually since 1983. From 1983 until 1998 it was known as the Finnish Cup. Since 1999 the Finnish championship team has been determined by the winning team of the Finnish Men's Championships league.

== List of champions ==
Year	Skip	Finish at Worlds (Includes playoffs standings)	Finish at European Championships (Includes playoffs standings)	Finish at Winter Olympics (Includes playoffs standings)
1983	Kai Pahl	Did not qualify	Pekka Kouvo 10th (1-6)	
1984	Tapio Juntunen	Did not qualify	Kari Ryokas 8th (2-5)	
1985	Jussi Uusipaavalniemi	Did not qualify	9th (3-3)	
1986	Jussi Uusipaavalniemi	Did not qualify	11th (2-4)	
1987	Jussi Uusipaavalniemi	Did not qualify	7th (5-4)	
1988	Jussi Uusipaavalniemi	9th (2-7)	12th (2-5)	
1989	Jussi Uusipaavalniemi	Did not qualify	11th (4-4)	
1990	Jussi Uusipaavalniemi	8th (2-7)	7th (4-3)	
1991	Jussi Uusipaavalniemi	10th (1-8)	8th (5-0)	
1992	Jussi Uusipaavalniemi	5th (5-4)	Tomi Rantamäki 6th (2-5)	
1993	Jari Laukkanen	Did not qualify	9th (5-2)	
1994	Tomi Rantamäki	Did not qualify	9th (3-4)	
1995	Jori Aro	Did not qualify	16th (1-4)	
1996	Markku Uusipaavalniemi	Did not qualify	T5th (3-3)	
1997	Markku Uusipaavalniemi	10th (1-8)	T5th (4-2)	
1998	Markku Uusipaavalniemi	Bronze (7-5)	4th (5-3)	
1999	Markku Uusipaavalniemi	8th (4-5)	Bronze (6-2)	
2000	Markku Uusipaavalniemi	Bronze (8-3)	Gold (11-0)	
2001	Markku Uusipaavalniemi	5th (5-4)	Bronze (7-4)	
2002	Markku Uusipaavalniemi	7th (5-4)	4th (6-5)	5th (5-4)
2003	Markku Uusipaavalniemi	4th (7-4)	Wille Mäkelä 9th (2-7)	
2004	Markku Uusipaavalniemi	Did not qualify	11th (11-2)	
2005	Markku Uusipaavalniemi	5th (8-3)	8th (5-7) (Including Challenge Series)	
2006	Markku Uusipaavalniemi	7th (6-5)	6th (5-4)	Silver (8-3)
2007	Markku Uusipaavalniemi	6th (6-5)	Kalle Kiiskinen 9th (2-7)	
2008	Kalle Kiiskinen	Did not qualify	11th (12-1) (Including Challenge Series)	
2009	Tomi Rantamäki	12th (1-10)	Tomi Rantamäki 9th (2-7)	
2010	Kalle Kiiskinen	Did not qualify	15th (5-2)	Did not qualify
2011	Markku Uusipaavalniemi	Did not qualify	T16 (4-3)	
2012	Aku Kauste	Did not qualify	11th (10-4) (Including Challenge Series)	
2013	Tomi Rantamäki	12th (2-9)	10th (1-8)	
2014	Aku Kauste	Did not qualify	11th (10-1) (Including Challenge Series)	
2015	Kalle Kiiskinen	Aku Kauste 4th (7-7)	Aku Kauste 4th (5-6)	
2016	Aku Kauste	8th (5-6)	9th (3-6)	
2017	Aku Kauste	Did not qualify	11th (8-3) (Including Challenge Series)	
2018	Kalle Kiiskinen	Did not qualify	Wille Mäkelä 9th (2-7)	
2019	Tomi Rantamäki	Did not qualify		
2020	Kalle Kiiskinen	cancelled due to COVID-19	cancelled due to COVID-19	

== See also ==
- Finnish Women's Curling Championship
- Finnish Mixed Curling Championship
- Finnish Mixed Doubles Curling Championship
- Finnish Wheelchair Curling Championship
- Finnish Junior Curling Championships
- Finnish Wheelchair Mixed Doubles Curling Championship
