= Jani Sullanmaa =

Finnish curler

- Curler
- Born: 19 December 1981 (age 44)

Team
- Curling club: Hyvinkään Curling, Hyvinkää, Finland
- Skip: Aku Kauste
- Third: Jani Sullanmaa
- Second: Pauli Jäämies
- Lead: Janne Pitko
- Alternate: Leo Mäkelä

Curling career
- World Championship: 4 (2006, 2007, 2009, 2013)
- European Championship: 6 (2003, 2005, 2006, 2007, 2008, 2012)
- Olympic: 1 (2006)
Medal record
Men's curling
Representing Finland
Winter Olympics
Silver medal – second place	2006 Turin

Jani Sullanmaa (born 19 December 1981 in Hyvinkää) is a Finnish curler. He currently plays third for Aku Kauste. With the team skipped by Markku Uusipaavalniemi, he received a silver medal at the 2006 Winter Olympics in Turin.

Sullanmaa played juniors for Tuomas Vuori as his third. He won a silver medal at the 2003 Junior "B" World Championships followed up with a 9th-place finish at the 2003 World Junior Curling Championships.

Sullanmaa would then join Markku Uusipaavalniemi's team. He first played as the team's alternate and moved to second position after the 2006 Winter Olympics. At the Olympics, Sullanmaa won a silver medal as a member of the team.

== Personal life ==
Sullanmaa is married to Finnish ice hockey player and coach Maija Hassinen-Sullanmaa.
