= Tiina Kautonen =

Finnish curler (born 1971)

Tiina Kautonen (born in 1971) is a Finnish curling skip. She competed internationally between 1997 and 2005 in the European and World Championships in both Women's and Mixed Curling. She won with her team the 2005 European Mixed Curling Championship for Finland.
