= Leo Ouni =

Finnish curler

- Curler
- Born: Leo Mäkelä; 16 September 1988 (age 38)

Team
- Curling club: Kisakallio CC, Lohja
- Skip: Kalle Kiiskinen
- Third: Teemu Salo
- Second: Leo Ouni
- Lead: Paavo Kuosmanen
- Alternate: Jermu Pöllänen

Curling career
- Member Association: Finland
- World Championship: 3 (2013, 2015, 2022)
- European Championship: 4 (2012, 2014, 2021, 2023)

Leo Ouni (né Mäkelä; born 16 September 1988) is a Finnish curler. He competed at the 2015 Ford World Men's Curling Championship in Halifax, Nova Scotia, Canada, as alternate for the Finnish national curling team.
