= Wille Mäkelä =

Finnish curler

- Curler
- Born: 2 March 1974 (age 52); Hyvinkää, Finland

Curling career
- World Championship: 7 (1997, 1998, 1999, 2000, 2001, 2002, 2005)
- European Championship: 12 (1995, 1996, 1997, 1998, 1999, 2000, 2001, 2002, 2003, 2005, 2007, 2018)
- Olympic: 2 (2002, 2006)
Medal record
Men's curling
Representing Finland
Olympic Games
Silver medal – second place	2006 Turin	Team
World Championships
Bronze medal – third place	1998 Kamloops	Team
Bronze medal – third place	2000 Glasgow	Team
European Championships
Gold medal – first place	2000 Oberstdorf	Team
Bronze medal – third place	1999 Chamonix	Team
Bronze medal – third place	2001 Vierumäki	Team

Wille Mäkelä (born 2 March 1974) is a Finnish curler and Olympic medalist. He received a silver medal at the 2006 Winter Olympics in Turin.

He has obtained two bronze medals in the World Curling Championships, and won a gold medal at the 2000 European Curling Championships with the Finnish team.
