= Tomi Rantamäki =

Finnish curler (born 1968)

- Curler
- Born: 18 September 1968 (age 58); Ähtäri, Finland

Team
- Mixed doubles partner: Tiina Suuripää

Curling career
- Member Association: Finland
- World Mixed Doubles Championship: 4 (2016, 2017, 2018, 2019)
- European Championship: 4 (1992, 1994, 2009, 2013)
- Olympic: 1 (2018)

Tomi Rantamäki (born 18 September 1968) is a Finnish curler from Espoo. He competed in the 2018 Winter Olympics in the mixed doubles competition. He and partner Oona Kauste placed 7th. He has served as the coach of the Chinese Mixed Doubles Curling team since 2021.

== Career ==
=== Athlete ===
Finished seventh in the mixed doubles at the PyeongChang 2018 Winter Olympic. Four consecutive World Mixed Doubles Championship appearances (2016–19), finishing a career-best seventh in his first two championships. Competed four European Championships from 1992 to 2013.

=== Coach ===
Led the Finnish men to a fourth-place finish at the 2015 World Championship.

Finished ninth with the Chinese women's team at the 2021 World Mixed Doubles Championship.

Led the Chinese Mixed Doubles team to the ninth-place finish at the 2022 Winter Olympic.

He coached the Estonian women's team at the 2024 World Women's Curling Championship.

== Personal life ==
Outside of coaching, Rantamäki works as a management consultant.
