= Kalle Kiiskinen =

Finnish curler

Medal record

Men's Curling

Representing Finland

Winter Olympics
Silver medal – second place	2006 Turin	

World Junior Curling Championships
Silver medal – second place	1997 Karuizawa	

Kalle Kiiskinen (born 6 September 1975 in Hyvinkää) is a Finnish curler. He received a silver medal at the 2006 Winter Olympics in Turin.

In Juniors, Kiiskinen played for Perttu Piilo and won a silver medal as his third at the 1997 World Junior Curling Championships.

Kiiskinen then joined up with Uusipaavalniemi, playing in his first World Curling Championships in 2002. He has played both second and third for Uusipaavalniemi. While never winning a medal at the worlds, at the 2006 Winter Olympics, Kiiskinen was a member of the Finnish team (skipped by Uusipaavalniemi) who won a silver medal.

After parting ways with Uusipaavalniemi, Kalle was the skip of the Finnish team in the 2007 European Curling Championships
