= 2012 Mercure Perth Masters =

- Host city: Perth, Scotland
- Arena: Dewars Centre
- Dates: January 5–8
- Winner: (Canada) Mike McEwen
- Curling club: Assiniboine Memorial CC; Winnipeg, Manitoba
- Skip: Mike McEwen
- Third: B. J. Neufeld
- Second: Matt Wozniak
- Lead: Denni Neufeld
- Finalist: (Norway) Thomas Ulsrud

The 2012 Mercure Perth Masters were held from January 5 to 8 at the Dewars Centre in Perth, Scotland as part of the 2011–12 World Curling Tour. The purse for the event was GBP£17,000, and the winner, Mike McEwen, received GBP£6,000. The event was held in a triple knockout format.

For the first time, a spot in the Masters was awarded to the winner of the 2011 Curl Atlantic Championship, James Grattan of New Brunswick, Canada.

== Teams ==
Skip	Third	Second	Lead	Locale
Tom Brewster	Greg Drummond	Scott Andrews	Michael Goodfellow	Aberdeen, Scotland
Alan Chalmers	Hamish Lorrian-Smith	Graham Cormack	Steve Rankin	Perth, Scotland
Benoit Schwarz (fourth)	Peter de Cruz (skip)	Gilles Vuille	Valentin Tanner	Switzerland
Niklas Edin	Sebastian Kraupp	Fredrik Lindberg	Viktor Kjäll	Karlstad, Sweden
David Edwards	John Penny	Scott MacLeod	Colin Campbell	Aberdeen, Scotland
Ally Fraser	David Reid	Ruairidh Greenwood	Tom Pendreigh	Scotland
Blair Fraser	Thomas Sloan	Hammy McMillan	Struan Wood	Perth, Scotland
James Grattan	Charlie Sullivan, Jr.	Steven Howard	Peter Case	(Canada) Oromocto, New Brunswick
Logan Gray	Alasdair Guthrie	Steve Mitchell	Sandy Gilmour	Stirling, Scotland
Brad Gushue	Ryan Fry	Geoff Walker	Adam Casey	(Canada) St. John's, Newfoundland and Labrador
John Hamilton	Philip Garden	Jamie Dick	Graeme Copland	Edinburgh, Scotland
Pascal Hess	Yves Hess	Florian Meister	Stefan Meienberg	Switzerland
Steve Laycock	Joel Jordison	Brennen Jones	Dallan Muyres	(Canada) Saskatoon, Saskatchewan
Ewan MacDonald	Graeme Connal	Peter Loudon	Euan Byers	Scotland
Lee McCleary	James Stark	Neil Joss	Gavin Fleming	Scotland
Mike McEwen	B. J. Neufeld	Matt Wozniak	Denni Neufeld	(Canada) Winnipeg, Manitoba
Jay McWilliam	Colin Dick	Grant Hardie	Billy Morton	Edinburgh, Scotland
Steffen Mellemseter	Markus Snøve Høiberg	Håvard Mellem	Magnus Nedregotten	Norway
David Murdoch	Glen Muirhead	Ross Paterson	Richard Woods	Lockerbie, Scotland
Mark Neeleman	Mark Rurup	Erik van der Zwan	Marcel Rijkes	Zoetermeer, Netherlands
Claudio Pescia	Sven Iten	Reto Seiler	Rainer Kobler	St. Gallen, Switzerland
Tomi Rantamäki	Jussi Uusipaavalniemi	Pekka Peura	Jermo Pollanen	Finland
Sandy Reid	Moray Combe	Neil MacArthur	David Soutar	Scotland
Graham Shaw	Brian Binnie	David Hay	Robin Niven	Scotland
David Sik	David Marek	Karel Uher	Milan Polivka	Prague, Czech Republic
David Smith	Warwick Smith	Craig Wilson	Ross Hepburn	Perth, Scotland
Kyle Smith	Thomas Muirhead	Kyle Waddell	Kerr Drummond	Scotland
Torkil Svensgaard	Kenneth Jørgensen	Martin Uhd Grønbech	Daniel Abrahamsen	Hvidovre, Denmark
Martins Truskans	Janis Rudzitis	Rihards Jeske	Didzis Petersons	Latvia
Alexey Tselousov	Andrey Drozdov	Alexey Stukalsky	Aleksey Kamnev	Moscow, Russia
Thomas Ulsrud	Torger Nergård	Christoffer Svae	Håvard Vad Petersson	Oslo, Norway

== Knockout results ==
=== A event ===
First Knockout
(Canada) Mike McEwen	7
(Latvia) Martins Truskans	3
(Scotland) Ally Fraser	6
(Scotland) Logan Gray	5
(Netherlands) Mark Neeleman	7
(Scotland) Jay McWilliam	2
(Scotland) Blair Fraser	2
(Switzerland) Claudio Pescia	4
(Scotland) Tom Brewster	6
(Denmark) Torkil Svensgaard	5
(Scotland) Graeme Shaw	4
(Canada) James Grattan	3
(Scotland) David Edwards	4
(Russia) Alexey Tselousov	2
(Scotland) Kyle Smith	5
(Canada) Steve Laycock	6

Quarterfinals
(Canada) Mike McEwen	7
(Scotland) Ally Fraser	6
(Netherlands) Mark Neeleman	5
(Switzerland) Claudio Pescia	6
(Scotland) Tom Brewster	6
(Scotland) Graeme Shaw	3
(Scotland) David Edwards	4
(Canada) Steve Laycock	3

Semifinals
(Canada) Mike McEwen	3
(Switzerland) Claudio Pescia	6
(Scotland) Tom Brewster	5
(Scotland) David Edwards	0

Qualifier 1
(Switzerland) Claudio Pescia	5
(Scotland) Tom Brewster	4

First Knockout
(Norway) Thomas Ulsrud	7
(Scotland) Craig Reid	2
(Norway) Steffen Mellemseter	4
(Scotland) Ewan MacDonald	6
(Switzerland) Pascal Hess	2
(Scotland) David Smith	9
(Scotland) John Hamilton	2
(Canada) Brad Gushue	6
(Scotland) David Murdoch	7
(Czech Republic) David Sik	4
(Finland) Tomi Rantamaki	7
(Scotland) Sandy Reid	3
(Switzerland) Peter de Cruz	8
(Scotland) Lee McCleary	7
(Scotland) Alan Chalmers	4
(Sweden) Niklas Edin	9

Quarterfinals
(Norway) Thomas Ulsrud	4
(Scotland) Ewan MacDonald	2
(Scotland) David Smith	4
(Canada) Brad Gushue	6
(Scotland) David Murdoch	3
(Finland) Tomi Rantamaki	5
(Switzerland) Peter de Cruz	3
(Sweden) Niklas Edin	6

Semifinals
(Norway) Thomas Ulsrud	6
(Canada) Brad Gushue	8
(Finland) Tomi Rantamaki	1
(Sweden) Niklas Edin	7

Qualifier 2
(Canada) Brad Gushue	5
(Sweden) Niklas Edin	4

=== B event ===
Second Knockout
(Latvia) Martins Truskans	2
(Scotland) Logan Gray	7
(Scotland) Jay McWilliam	2
(Scotland) Blair Fraser	8
(Denmark) Torkil Svensgaard	3
(Canada) James Grattan	8
(Russia) Alexey Tselousov	2
(Scotland) Kyle Smith	4

Quarterfinals
(Scotland) Logan Gray	6
(Scotland) Blair Fraser	5
(Canada) James Grattan	3
(Scotland) Kyle Smith	4

Semifinals
(Scotland) Logan Gray	4
(Norway) Thomas Ulsrud	8
(Scotland) Kyle Smith	7
(Finland) Tomi Rantamaki	2

To Qualifier 3
(Norway) Thomas Ulsrud	5
(Scotland) Kyle Smith	1
Qualifier 3
(Norway) Thomas Ulsrud	6
(Sweden) Niklas Edin	5

Second Knockout		Semifinals		To Qualifier 3
(Scotland) Ewan MacDonald	2
(Scotland) David Smith	4	(Scotland) David Smith	7
(Scotland) David Murdoch	4	(Switzerland) Peter de Cruz	2
(Switzerland) Peter de Cruz	5			(Scotland) David Smith	2
				(Sweden) Niklas Edin	5

Second Knockout		Semifinals		To Qualifier 4
(Scotland) Ally Fraser	9
(Netherlands) Mark Neeleman	4	(Scotland) Ally Fraser	2
(Scotland) Graeme Shaw	8	(Scotland) Graeme Shaw	7
(Canada) Steve Laycock	4			(Scotland) Graeme Shaw	2
				(Scotland) Tom Brewster	7

Second Knockout
(Scotland) Craig Reid	9
(Norway) Steffen Mellemseter	2
(Switzerland) Pascal Hess	9
(Scotland) John Hamilton	0
(Czech Republic) David Sik	1
(Scotland) Sandy Reid	7
(Scotland) Lee McCleary	6
(Scotland) Alan Chalmers	4

Quarterfinals
(Scotland) Craig Reid	3
(Switzerland) Pascal Hess	6
(Scotland) Sandy Reid	5
(Scotland) Lee McCleary	3

Semifinals
(Canada) Mike McEwen	7
(Switzerland) Pascal Hess	2
(Scotland) David Edwards	3
(Scotland) Sandy Reid	6

To Qualifier 4
(Canada) Mike McEwen	8
(Scotland) Sandy Reid	2
Qualifier 4
(Scotland) Tom Brewster	1
(Canada) Mike McEwen	7

=== C event ===
Third Knockout
(Latvia) Martins Truskans	1
(Scotland) Jay McWilliam	10
(Denmark) Torkil Svensgaard	5
(Russia) Alexey Tselousov	2

Quarterfinals
(Scotland) Ewan MacDonald	8
(Scotland) Jay McWilliam	2
(Scotland) David Murdoch	8
(Denmark) Torkil Svensgaard	5

Semifinals
(Scotland) Ewan MacDonald	1
(Scotland) David Murdoch	6

Qualifier 5
(Scotland) David Murdoch	6
(Sweden) Niklas Edin	7

Third Knockout
(Scotland) Blair Fraser	3
(Canada) James Grattan	6

Quarterfinals
(Switzerland) Pascal Hess	4
(Scotland) David Edwards	6
(Switzerland) Peter de Cruz	5
(Canada) James Grattan	3

Semifinals
(Scotland) David Edwards	4
(Scotland) Kyle Smith	6
(Switzerland) Peter de Cruz	1
(Scotland) Graeme Shaw	5

Qualifier 6
(Scotland) Kyle Smith	3
(Scotland) Graeme Shaw	4

Third Knockout
(Scotland) Craig Reid	6
(Scotland) Lee McCleary	8

Quarterfinals
(Scotland) Ally Fraser	5
(Scotland) Lee McCleary	6
(Scotland) Logan Gray	8
(Finland) Tomi Rantamaki	1

Semifinals
(Scotland) Lee McCleary	2
(Scotland) David Smith	8
(Scotland) Logan Gray	6
(Scotland) Sandy Reid	3

Qualifier 7
(Scotland) David Smith	7
(Scotland) Logan Gray	3

Third Knockout
(Norway) Steffen Mellemseter	2
(Scotland) John Hamilton	8
(Czech Republic) David Sik	7
(Scotland) Alan Chalmers	6

Quarterfinals
(Netherlands) Mark Neeleman	5
(Scotland) John Hamilton	6
(Canada) Steve Laycock	8
(Czech Republic) David Sik	5

Semifinals
(Scotland) John Hamilton	2
(Canada) Steve Laycock	7

Qualifier 8
(Canada) Steve Laycock	6
(Scotland) Tom Brewster	2

== Playoffs ==
Quarterfinals
(Switzerland) Claudio Pescia	2
(Canada) Steve Laycock	6
(Norway) Thomas Ulsrud	5
(Scotland) Graeme Shaw	3
(Canada) Mike McEwen	4
(Sweden) Niklas Edin	1
(Canada) Brad Gushue	7
(Scotland) David Smith	2

Semifinals
(Canada) Steve Laycock	1
(Norway) Thomas Ulsrud	9
(Canada) Mike McEwen	5
(Canada) Brad Gushue	4

Final
(Norway) Thomas Ulsrud	2
(Canada) Mike McEwen	6
