= 2015 European Curling Championships – Men's tournament =

2015 European Curling Championships Men's tournament
- Host city: Esbjerg, Denmark
- Arena: Granly Hockey Arena; Esbjerg Curling Club
- Dates: November 20–28
- Winner: Sweden
- Curling club: Karlstads CK, Karlstad
- Skip: Niklas Edin
- Third: Oskar Eriksson
- Second: Kristian Lindström
- Lead: Christoffer Sundgren
- Alternate: Henrik Leek
- Finalist: Switzerland (Peter de Cruz)

The men's tournament of the 2015 European Curling Championships were held from November 20 to 28 in Esbjerg, Denmark. The winners of the Group C tournament in Champéry, Switzerland would be promoted to the Group B tournament. The top seven men's teams at the 2015 European Curling Championships would represent their respective nations at the 2016 World Men's Curling Championship in Basel, Switzerland.

== Group A ==
=== Teams ===
| Czech Republic | Finland | Germany | Italy | Netherlands |
|---|---|---|---|---|
| Skip: David Šik; Third: Radek Boháč; Second: Tomáš Paul; Lead: Erik Šik; Alternate: Kryštof Chaloupek | Skip: Aku Kauste; Third: Kasper Hakunti; Second: Pauli Jäämies; Lead: Janne Pitko; Alternate: Jere Sullanmaa | Skip: Alexander Baumann; Third: Manuel Walter; Second: Marc Muskatewitz; Lead: Sebastian Schweizer; Alternate: Daniel Herberg | Fourth: Amos Mosaner; Skip: Joël Retornaz; Second: Sebastiano Arman; Lead: Daniele Ferrazza; Alternate: Andrea Pilzer | Skip: Jaap van Dorp; Third: Wouter Gösgens; Second: Laurens Hoekman; Lead: Carlo Glasbergen; Alternate: Stefano Miog |
| Norway | Russia | Scotland | Sweden | Switzerland |
| Skip: Thomas Ulsrud; Third: Torger Nergård; Second: Christoffer Svae; Lead: Håvard Vad Petersson; Alternate: Sander Rølvåg | Skip: Alexey Stukalskiy; Third: Evgeniy Arkhipov; Second: Artur Razhabov; Lead: Anton Kalalb; Alternate: Andrey Drozdov | Skip: Kyle Smith; Third: Thomas Muirhead; Second: Kyle Waddell; Lead: Cammy Smith; Alternate: Glen Muirhead | Skip: Niklas Edin; Third: Oskar Eriksson; Second: Kristian Lindström; Lead: Christoffer Sundgren; Alternate: Henrik Leek | Fourth: Benoît Schwarz; Third: Claudio Pätz; Skip: Peter de Cruz; Lead: Valentin Tanner; Alternate: Michael Probst |

=== Round-robin standings ===
Key
| Teams to Playoffs |
| Teams to Tiebreaker |
| Teams relegated to 2016 Group B |

Final round-robin standings

| Country | Skip | W | L | PF | PA | Ends Won | Ends Lost | Blank Ends | Stolen Ends | Shot Pct. |
|---|---|---|---|---|---|---|---|---|---|---|
| Norway | Thomas Ulsrud | 9 | 0 | 78 | 31 | 39 | 26 | 6 | 13 | 91% |
| Finland | Aku Kauste | 5 | 4 | 60 | 53 | 36 | 33 | 15 | 11 | 83% |
| Switzerland | Peter de Cruz | 5 | 4 | 58 | 44 | 36 | 29 | 17 | 11 | 86% |
| Sweden | Niklas Edin | 5 | 4 | 55 | 46 | 35 | 32 | 12 | 9 | 84% |
| Scotland | Kyle Smith | 5 | 4 | 56 | 62 | 33 | 40 | 8 | 7 | 81% |
| Germany | Alexander Baumann | 4 | 5 | 42 | 62 | 31 | 37 | 12 | 3 | 81% |
| Russia | Alexey Stukalskiy | 4 | 5 | 63 | 63 | 40 | 37 | 11 | 9 | 83% |
| Italy | Joël Retornaz | 3 | 6 | 46 | 55 | 30 | 35 | 14 | 8 | 81% |
| Czech Republic | David Šik | 3 | 6 | 47 | 69 | 37 | 40 | 8 | 7 | 78% |
| Netherlands | Jaap van Dorp | 2 | 7 | 44 | 64 | 32 | 40 | 7 | 7 | 78% |

=== Round-robin results ===
All draw times are listed in Central European Time (UTC+01).

==== Draw 1 ====
Saturday, November 21, 9:00

| Sheet A | 1 | 2 | 3 | 4 | 5 | 6 | 7 | 8 | 9 | 10 | Final |
|---|---|---|---|---|---|---|---|---|---|---|---|
| Norway (Ulsrud) 🔨 | 2 | 1 | 0 | 2 | 0 | 5 | 0 | 1 | X | X | 11 |
| Scotland (Smith) | 0 | 0 | 0 | 0 | 1 | 0 | 3 | 0 | X | X | 4 |

| Sheet B | 1 | 2 | 3 | 4 | 5 | 6 | 7 | 8 | 9 | 10 | Final |
|---|---|---|---|---|---|---|---|---|---|---|---|
| Switzerland (de Cruz) | 0 | 0 | 0 | 1 | 0 | 0 | 0 | 1 | 0 | 0 | 2 |
| Germany (Baumann) 🔨 | 0 | 0 | 1 | 0 | 1 | 0 | 0 | 0 | 0 | 1 | 3 |

| Sheet C | 1 | 2 | 3 | 4 | 5 | 6 | 7 | 8 | 9 | 10 | Final |
|---|---|---|---|---|---|---|---|---|---|---|---|
| Russia (Stukalskiy) | 0 | 1 | 0 | 0 | 1 | 0 | 1 | 3 | 0 | 0 | 6 |
| Italy (Retornaz) 🔨 | 2 | 0 | 1 | 1 | 0 | 3 | 0 | 0 | 0 | 0 | 7 |

| Sheet D | 1 | 2 | 3 | 4 | 5 | 6 | 7 | 8 | 9 | 10 | Final |
|---|---|---|---|---|---|---|---|---|---|---|---|
| Sweden (Edin) 🔨 | 2 | 0 | 2 | 0 | 0 | 2 | 0 | 1 | 0 | 0 | 7 |
| Czech Republic (Šik) | 0 | 2 | 0 | 1 | 0 | 0 | 1 | 0 | 0 | 1 | 5 |

| Sheet E | 1 | 2 | 3 | 4 | 5 | 6 | 7 | 8 | 9 | 10 | Final |
|---|---|---|---|---|---|---|---|---|---|---|---|
| Netherlands (van Dorp) | 0 | 0 | 0 | 2 | 0 | 1 | 0 | 2 | 3 | X | 8 |
| Finland (Kauste) 🔨 | 1 | 1 | 1 | 0 | 2 | 0 | 1 | 0 | 0 | X | 6 |

==== Draw 2 ====
Saturday, November 21, 19:00

| Sheet A | 1 | 2 | 3 | 4 | 5 | 6 | 7 | 8 | 9 | 10 | Final |
|---|---|---|---|---|---|---|---|---|---|---|---|
| Germany (Baumann) 🔨 | 2 | 0 | 1 | 0 | 0 | 1 | 0 | 2 | 0 | 1 | 7 |
| Sweden (Edin) | 0 | 1 | 0 | 1 | 1 | 0 | 1 | 0 | 2 | 0 | 6 |

| Sheet B | 1 | 2 | 3 | 4 | 5 | 6 | 7 | 8 | 9 | 10 | Final |
|---|---|---|---|---|---|---|---|---|---|---|---|
| Scotland (Smith) 🔨 | 2 | 0 | 0 | 1 | 0 | 2 | 0 | 1 | 0 | 3 | 9 |
| Czech Republic (Šik) | 0 | 1 | 1 | 0 | 2 | 0 | 2 | 0 | 1 | 0 | 7 |

| Sheet C | 1 | 2 | 3 | 4 | 5 | 6 | 7 | 8 | 9 | 10 | Final |
|---|---|---|---|---|---|---|---|---|---|---|---|
| Netherlands (van Dorp) | 0 | 1 | 0 | 0 | 0 | 1 | X | X | X | X | 2 |
| Norway (Ulsrud) 🔨 | 3 | 0 | 0 | 2 | 3 | 0 | X | X | X | X | 8 |

| Sheet D | 1 | 2 | 3 | 4 | 5 | 6 | 7 | 8 | 9 | 10 | Final |
|---|---|---|---|---|---|---|---|---|---|---|---|
| Finland (Kauste) | 0 | 0 | 2 | 0 | 2 | 0 | 0 | 2 | 0 | 1 | 7 |
| Italy (Retornaz) 🔨 | 0 | 0 | 0 | 1 | 0 | 1 | 0 | 0 | 1 | 0 | 3 |

| Sheet E | 1 | 2 | 3 | 4 | 5 | 6 | 7 | 8 | 9 | 10 | Final |
|---|---|---|---|---|---|---|---|---|---|---|---|
| Switzerland (de Cruz) | 0 | 1 | 0 | 1 | 1 | 1 | 0 | 2 | 0 | 0 | 6 |
| Russia (Stukalskiy) 🔨 | 2 | 0 | 1 | 0 | 0 | 0 | 2 | 0 | 0 | 3 | 8 |

==== Draw 3 ====
Sunday, November 22, 12:00

| Sheet A | 1 | 2 | 3 | 4 | 5 | 6 | 7 | 8 | 9 | 10 | Final |
|---|---|---|---|---|---|---|---|---|---|---|---|
| Italy (Retornaz) | 0 | 0 | 1 | 0 | 0 | 2 | 1 | 0 | 0 | X | 4 |
| Switzerland (de Cruz) 🔨 | 2 | 2 | 0 | 0 | 2 | 0 | 0 | 0 | 2 | X | 8 |

| Sheet B | 1 | 2 | 3 | 4 | 5 | 6 | 7 | 8 | 9 | 10 | Final |
|---|---|---|---|---|---|---|---|---|---|---|---|
| Norway (Ulsrud) 🔨 | 0 | 3 | 0 | 1 | 0 | 2 | 2 | 1 | X | X | 9 |
| Finland (Kauste) | 1 | 0 | 1 | 0 | 1 | 0 | 0 | 0 | X | X | 3 |

| Sheet C | 1 | 2 | 3 | 4 | 5 | 6 | 7 | 8 | 9 | 10 | Final |
|---|---|---|---|---|---|---|---|---|---|---|---|
| Scotland (Smith) | 0 | 1 | 0 | 1 | 0 | 2 | 0 | 2 | 0 | X | 6 |
| Sweden (Edin) 🔨 | 3 | 0 | 2 | 0 | 1 | 0 | 2 | 0 | 1 | X | 9 |

| Sheet D | 1 | 2 | 3 | 4 | 5 | 6 | 7 | 8 | 9 | 10 | Final |
|---|---|---|---|---|---|---|---|---|---|---|---|
| Russia (Stukalskiy) 🔨 | 0 | 3 | 0 | 0 | 0 | 2 | 0 | 1 | 0 | 1 | 7 |
| Netherlands (van Dorp) | 1 | 0 | 0 | 1 | 0 | 0 | 2 | 0 | 1 | 0 | 5 |

| Sheet E | 1 | 2 | 3 | 4 | 5 | 6 | 7 | 8 | 9 | 10 | Final |
|---|---|---|---|---|---|---|---|---|---|---|---|
| Germany (Baumann) 🔨 | 1 | 0 | 0 | 1 | 0 | 0 | 0 | 0 | 1 | 0 | 3 |
| Czech Republic (Šik) | 0 | 0 | 1 | 0 | 0 | 1 | 1 | 1 | 0 | 1 | 5 |

==== Draw 4 ====
Monday, November 23, 9:00

| Sheet A | 1 | 2 | 3 | 4 | 5 | 6 | 7 | 8 | 9 | 10 | 11 | Final |
|---|---|---|---|---|---|---|---|---|---|---|---|---|
| Czech Republic (Šik) | 0 | 2 | 0 | 0 | 2 | 0 | 1 | 1 | 1 | 0 | 1 | 8 |
| Netherlands (van Dorp) 🔨 | 2 | 0 | 2 | 1 | 0 | 1 | 0 | 0 | 0 | 1 | 0 | 7 |

| Sheet B | 1 | 2 | 3 | 4 | 5 | 6 | 7 | 8 | 9 | 10 | Final |
|---|---|---|---|---|---|---|---|---|---|---|---|
| Russia (Stukalskiy) 🔨 | 1 | 0 | 1 | 0 | 1 | 0 | 2 | 0 | 2 | 0 | 7 |
| Sweden (Edin) | 0 | 1 | 0 | 0 | 0 | 2 | 0 | 3 | 0 | 2 | 8 |

| Sheet C | 1 | 2 | 3 | 4 | 5 | 6 | 7 | 8 | 9 | 10 | Final |
|---|---|---|---|---|---|---|---|---|---|---|---|
| Finland (Kauste) 🔨 | 2 | 0 | 2 | 0 | 1 | 0 | 0 | 2 | 1 | X | 8 |
| Germany (Baumann) | 0 | 1 | 0 | 0 | 0 | 2 | 1 | 0 | 0 | X | 4 |

| Sheet D | 1 | 2 | 3 | 4 | 5 | 6 | 7 | 8 | 9 | 10 | Final |
|---|---|---|---|---|---|---|---|---|---|---|---|
| Italy (Retornaz) 🔨 | 1 | 0 | 0 | 0 | 2 | 0 | 0 | 0 | X | X | 3 |
| Norway (Ulsrud) | 0 | 2 | 0 | 1 | 0 | 3 | 1 | 1 | X | X | 8 |

| Sheet E | 1 | 2 | 3 | 4 | 5 | 6 | 7 | 8 | 9 | 10 | Final |
|---|---|---|---|---|---|---|---|---|---|---|---|
| Scotland (Smith) | 0 | 0 | 0 | 2 | 0 | 0 | X | X | X | X | 2 |
| Switzerland (de Cruz) 🔨 | 1 | 3 | 1 | 0 | 2 | 2 | X | X | X | X | 9 |

==== Draw 5 ====
Monday, November 23, 19:00

| Sheet A | 1 | 2 | 3 | 4 | 5 | 6 | 7 | 8 | 9 | 10 | Final |
|---|---|---|---|---|---|---|---|---|---|---|---|
| Russia (Stukalskiy) | 0 | 0 | 1 | 0 | 2 | 0 | 2 | 0 | 3 | 0 | 8 |
| Germany (Baumann) 🔨 | 0 | 2 | 0 | 2 | 0 | 2 | 0 | 1 | 0 | 2 | 9 |

| Sheet B | 1 | 2 | 3 | 4 | 5 | 6 | 7 | 8 | 9 | 10 | Final |
|---|---|---|---|---|---|---|---|---|---|---|---|
| Netherlands (van Dorp) | 1 | 1 | 1 | 1 | 1 | 1 | 0 | 0 | 2 | X | 8 |
| Scotland (Smith) 🔨 | 0 | 0 | 0 | 0 | 0 | 0 | 1 | 1 | 0 | X | 2 |

| Sheet C | 1 | 2 | 3 | 4 | 5 | 6 | 7 | 8 | 9 | 10 | Final |
|---|---|---|---|---|---|---|---|---|---|---|---|
| Norway (Ulsrud) 🔨 | 2 | 2 | 0 | 2 | 0 | 3 | 0 | 0 | X | X | 9 |
| Czech Republic (Šik) | 0 | 0 | 1 | 0 | 1 | 0 | 2 | 0 | X | X | 4 |

| Sheet D | 1 | 2 | 3 | 4 | 5 | 6 | 7 | 8 | 9 | 10 | Final |
|---|---|---|---|---|---|---|---|---|---|---|---|
| Switzerland (de Cruz) | 0 | 0 | 1 | 0 | 1 | 0 | 2 | 1 | 0 | X | 5 |
| Finland (Kauste) 🔨 | 0 | 2 | 0 | 3 | 0 | 2 | 0 | 0 | 2 | X | 9 |

| Sheet E | 1 | 2 | 3 | 4 | 5 | 6 | 7 | 8 | 9 | 10 | Final |
|---|---|---|---|---|---|---|---|---|---|---|---|
| Sweden (Edin) 🔨 | 1 | 2 | 0 | 0 | 3 | 3 | X | X | X | X | 9 |
| Italy (Retornaz) | 0 | 0 | 0 | 1 | 0 | 0 | X | X | X | X | 1 |

==== Draw 6 ====
Tuesday, November 24, 14:00

| Sheet A | 1 | 2 | 3 | 4 | 5 | 6 | 7 | 8 | 9 | 10 | Final |
|---|---|---|---|---|---|---|---|---|---|---|---|
| Netherlands (van Dorp) 🔨 | 1 | 0 | 0 | 0 | 1 | 0 | 0 | 1 | 0 | X | 3 |
| Italy (Retornaz) | 0 | 0 | 2 | 3 | 0 | 1 | 1 | 0 | 2 | X | 9 |

| Sheet B | 1 | 2 | 3 | 4 | 5 | 6 | 7 | 8 | 9 | 10 | Final |
|---|---|---|---|---|---|---|---|---|---|---|---|
| Germany (Baumann) 🔨 | 1 | 0 | 0 | 1 | 0 | 1 | 0 | X | X | X | 3 |
| Norway (Ulsrud) | 0 | 3 | 1 | 0 | 2 | 0 | 2 | X | X | X | 8 |

| Sheet C | 1 | 2 | 3 | 4 | 5 | 6 | 7 | 8 | 9 | 10 | Final |
|---|---|---|---|---|---|---|---|---|---|---|---|
| Sweden (Edin) | 0 | 1 | 1 | 0 | 0 | 0 | 0 | 0 | 0 | 0 | 2 |
| Switzerland (de Cruz) 🔨 | 1 | 0 | 0 | 0 | 0 | 0 | 1 | 0 | 0 | 1 | 3 |

| Sheet D | 1 | 2 | 3 | 4 | 5 | 6 | 7 | 8 | 9 | 10 | Final |
|---|---|---|---|---|---|---|---|---|---|---|---|
| Czech Republic (Šik) | 0 | 1 | 0 | 1 | 0 | 0 | 0 | 1 | X | X | 3 |
| Russia (Stukalskiy) 🔨 | 3 | 0 | 1 | 0 | 2 | 1 | 1 | 0 | X | X | 8 |

| Sheet E | 1 | 2 | 3 | 4 | 5 | 6 | 7 | 8 | 9 | 10 | Final |
|---|---|---|---|---|---|---|---|---|---|---|---|
| Finland (Kauste) 🔨 | 0 | 2 | 0 | 1 | 0 | 0 | 0 | 0 | 0 | 0 | 3 |
| Scotland (Smith) | 1 | 0 | 1 | 0 | 0 | 0 | 0 | 2 | 0 | 3 | 7 |

==== Draw 7 ====
Wednesday, November 25, 8:00

| Sheet A | 1 | 2 | 3 | 4 | 5 | 6 | 7 | 8 | 9 | 10 | Final |
|---|---|---|---|---|---|---|---|---|---|---|---|
| Switzerland (de Cruz) | 0 | 2 | 0 | 1 | 0 | 1 | 0 | 2 | 4 | X | 10 |
| Czech Republic (Šik) 🔨 | 2 | 0 | 0 | 0 | 1 | 0 | 1 | 0 | 0 | X | 4 |

| Sheet B | 1 | 2 | 3 | 4 | 5 | 6 | 7 | 8 | 9 | 10 | Final |
|---|---|---|---|---|---|---|---|---|---|---|---|
| Finland (Kauste) 🔨 | 2 | 0 | 0 | 0 | 1 | 2 | 0 | 0 | 2 | 0 | 7 |
| Russia (Stukalskiy) | 0 | 4 | 0 | 1 | 0 | 0 | 2 | 0 | 0 | 1 | 8 |

| Sheet C | 1 | 2 | 3 | 4 | 5 | 6 | 7 | 8 | 9 | 10 | Final |
|---|---|---|---|---|---|---|---|---|---|---|---|
| Italy (Retornaz) | 0 | 0 | 2 | 0 | 0 | 1 | 0 | 0 | 1 | 0 | 4 |
| Scotland (Smith) 🔨 | 1 | 1 | 0 | 2 | 0 | 0 | 1 | 0 | 0 | 1 | 6 |

| Sheet D | 1 | 2 | 3 | 4 | 5 | 6 | 7 | 8 | 9 | 10 | Final |
|---|---|---|---|---|---|---|---|---|---|---|---|
| Netherlands (van Dorp) | 0 | 0 | 0 | 1 | 0 | 0 | 3 | 0 | 0 | X | 4 |
| Germany (Baumann) 🔨 | 0 | 1 | 1 | 0 | 2 | 0 | 0 | 2 | 1 | X | 7 |

| Sheet E | 1 | 2 | 3 | 4 | 5 | 6 | 7 | 8 | 9 | 10 | Final |
|---|---|---|---|---|---|---|---|---|---|---|---|
| Norway (Ulsrud) | 0 | 3 | 2 | 0 | 1 | 3 | X | X | X | X | 9 |
| Sweden (Edin) 🔨 | 1 | 0 | 0 | 1 | 0 | 0 | X | X | X | X | 2 |

==== Draw 8 ====
Wednesday, November 25, 16:00

| Sheet A | 1 | 2 | 3 | 4 | 5 | 6 | 7 | 8 | 9 | 10 | Final |
|---|---|---|---|---|---|---|---|---|---|---|---|
| Scotland (Smith) | 0 | 2 | 0 | 0 | 0 | 2 | 0 | 3 | 1 | 0 | 8 |
| Russia (Stukalskiy) 🔨 | 1 | 0 | 0 | 2 | 1 | 0 | 1 | 0 | 0 | 1 | 6 |

| Sheet B | 1 | 2 | 3 | 4 | 5 | 6 | 7 | 8 | 9 | 10 | Final |
|---|---|---|---|---|---|---|---|---|---|---|---|
| Sweden (Edin) 🔨 | 2 | 1 | 1 | 1 | 1 | 1 | 0 | X | X | X | 7 |
| Netherlands (van Dorp) | 0 | 0 | 0 | 0 | 0 | 0 | 1 | X | X | X | 1 |

| Sheet C | 1 | 2 | 3 | 4 | 5 | 6 | 7 | 8 | 9 | 10 | Final |
|---|---|---|---|---|---|---|---|---|---|---|---|
| Czech Republic (Šik) | 1 | 0 | 0 | 0 | 0 | 2 | 0 | 1 | X | X | 4 |
| Finland (Kauste) 🔨 | 0 | 3 | 0 | 4 | 1 | 0 | 2 | 0 | X | X | 10 |

| Sheet D | 1 | 2 | 3 | 4 | 5 | 6 | 7 | 8 | 9 | 10 | Final |
|---|---|---|---|---|---|---|---|---|---|---|---|
| Norway (Ulsrud) 🔨 | 2 | 0 | 1 | 0 | 1 | 0 | 0 | 1 | 0 | 1 | 6 |
| Switzerland (de Cruz) | 0 | 1 | 0 | 2 | 0 | 0 | 1 | 0 | 1 | 0 | 5 |

| Sheet E | 1 | 2 | 3 | 4 | 5 | 6 | 7 | 8 | 9 | 10 | Final |
|---|---|---|---|---|---|---|---|---|---|---|---|
| Italy (Retornaz) 🔨 | 2 | 2 | 1 | 0 | 0 | 4 | X | X | X | X | 9 |
| Germany (Baumann) | 0 | 0 | 0 | 1 | 0 | 0 | X | X | X | X | 1 |

==== Draw 9 ====
Thursday, November 26, 9:00

| Sheet A | 1 | 2 | 3 | 4 | 5 | 6 | 7 | 8 | 9 | 10 | 11 | Final |
|---|---|---|---|---|---|---|---|---|---|---|---|---|
| Sweden (Edin) 🔨 | 0 | 0 | 2 | 0 | 2 | 0 | 0 | 0 | 0 | 1 | 0 | 5 |
| Finland (Kauste) | 0 | 1 | 0 | 1 | 0 | 0 | 2 | 0 | 1 | 0 | 2 | 7 |

| Sheet B | 1 | 2 | 3 | 4 | 5 | 6 | 7 | 8 | 9 | 10 | 11 | Final |
|---|---|---|---|---|---|---|---|---|---|---|---|---|
| Czech Republic (Šik) 🔨 | 0 | 0 | 1 | 0 | 0 | 1 | 0 | 2 | 0 | 2 | 1 | 7 |
| Italy (Retornaz) | 0 | 1 | 0 | 1 | 1 | 0 | 2 | 0 | 1 | 0 | 0 | 6 |

| Sheet C | 1 | 2 | 3 | 4 | 5 | 6 | 7 | 8 | 9 | 10 | Final |
|---|---|---|---|---|---|---|---|---|---|---|---|
| Switzerland (de Cruz) | 0 | 1 | 0 | 5 | 0 | 3 | 0 | 1 | 0 | X | 10 |
| Netherlands (van Dorp) 🔨 | 1 | 0 | 0 | 0 | 2 | 0 | 2 | 0 | 1 | X | 6 |

| Sheet D | 1 | 2 | 3 | 4 | 5 | 6 | 7 | 8 | 9 | 10 | Final |
|---|---|---|---|---|---|---|---|---|---|---|---|
| Germany (Baumann) | 0 | 0 | 0 | 1 | 0 | 2 | 0 | 2 | 0 | X | 5 |
| Scotland (Smith) 🔨 | 2 | 2 | 3 | 0 | 1 | 0 | 1 | 0 | 3 | X | 12 |

| Sheet E | 1 | 2 | 3 | 4 | 5 | 6 | 7 | 8 | 9 | 10 | Final |
|---|---|---|---|---|---|---|---|---|---|---|---|
| Russia (Stukalskiy) | 0 | 0 | 1 | 0 | 1 | 1 | 0 | 1 | 1 | 0 | 5 |
| Norway (Ulsrud) 🔨 | 2 | 3 | 0 | 0 | 0 | 0 | 2 | 0 | 0 | 3 | 10 |

=== Placement game ===
Thursday, November 26, 14:00

| Sheet D | 1 | 2 | 3 | 4 | 5 | 6 | 7 | 8 | 9 | 10 | 11 | Final |
|---|---|---|---|---|---|---|---|---|---|---|---|---|
| Czech Republic (Šik) 🔨 | 1 | 1 | 0 | 0 | 0 | 2 | 0 | 1 | 0 | 1 | 0 | 6 |
| Italy (Retornaz) | 0 | 0 | 2 | 0 | 1 | 0 | 2 | 0 | 1 | 0 | 1 | 7 |

=== World Challenge Games ===
The World Challenge Games are held between the eighth-ranked team in the Group A round robin and the winner of the Group B tournament to determine which of these two teams will play at the World Championships.

==== Challenge 1 ====
Friday, November 27, 19:00

| Team | 1 | 2 | 3 | 4 | 5 | 6 | 7 | 8 | 9 | 10 | Final |
|---|---|---|---|---|---|---|---|---|---|---|---|
| Italy (Retornaz) 🔨 | 0 | 1 | 0 | 0 | 1 | 0 | 0 | 0 | X | X | 2 |
| Denmark (Stjerne) | 0 | 0 | 1 | 0 | 0 | 4 | 1 | 1 | X | X | 7 |

==== Challenge 2 ====
Saturday, November 28, 9:00

| Team | 1 | 2 | 3 | 4 | 5 | 6 | 7 | 8 | 9 | 10 | Final |
|---|---|---|---|---|---|---|---|---|---|---|---|
| Italy (Retornaz) | 1 | 1 | 0 | 0 | 0 | 0 | 0 | 0 | 0 | X | 2 |
| Denmark (Stjerne) 🔨 | 0 | 0 | 1 | 0 | 2 | 1 | 0 | 0 | 0 | X | 4 |

=== Tiebreaker ===
Thursday, November 26, 14:00

| Sheet C | 1 | 2 | 3 | 4 | 5 | 6 | 7 | 8 | 9 | 10 | Final |
|---|---|---|---|---|---|---|---|---|---|---|---|
| Sweden (Edin) 🔨 | 0 | 2 | 0 | 3 | 0 | 0 | 2 | 0 | 1 | 0 | 8 |
| Scotland (Smith) | 0 | 0 | 2 | 0 | 3 | 0 | 0 | 1 | 0 | 1 | 7 |

Player percentages
| Sweden | | Scotland | |
|---|---|---|---|
| Christoffer Sundgren | 89% | Cammy Smith | 84% |
| Kristian Lindström | 86% | Kyle Waddell | 73% |
| Oskar Eriksson | 86% | Thomas Muirhead | 75% |
| Niklas Edin | 79% | Kyle Smith | 70% |
| Total | 85% | Total | 76% |

=== Playoffs ===
Semifinals
1 | Norway | 7
4 | Sweden | 8
2 | Finland | 4
3 | Switzerland | 10

Final
4 | Sweden | 7
3 | Switzerland | 6

| Bronze-medal game |
| 1 | Norway | 7 |
| 2 | Finland | 4 |

==== Semifinals ====
Friday, November 27, 13:30

| Team | 1 | 2 | 3 | 4 | 5 | 6 | 7 | 8 | 9 | 10 | 11 | Final |
|---|---|---|---|---|---|---|---|---|---|---|---|---|
| Norway (Ulsrud) 🔨 | 0 | 2 | 0 | 0 | 0 | 0 | 3 | 0 | 0 | 2 | 0 | 7 |
| Sweden (Edin) | 0 | 0 | 3 | 1 | 1 | 0 | 0 | 0 | 2 | 0 | 1 | 8 |

Player percentages
| Norway | | Sweden | |
|---|---|---|---|
| Håvard Vad Petersson | 93% | Christoffer Sundgren | 91% |
| Christoffer Svae | 91% | Kristian Lindström | 88% |
| Torger Nergård | 88% | Oskar Eriksson | 86% |
| Thomas Ulsrud | 70% | Niklas Edin | 92% |
| Total | 86% | Total | 89% |

| Team | 1 | 2 | 3 | 4 | 5 | 6 | 7 | 8 | 9 | 10 | Final |
|---|---|---|---|---|---|---|---|---|---|---|---|
| Finland (Kauste) | 0 | 1 | 0 | 0 | 2 | 0 | 1 | 0 | X | X | 4 |
| Switzerland (de Cruz) 🔨 | 1 | 0 | 3 | 0 | 0 | 3 | 0 | 3 | X | X | 10 |

Player percentages
| Finland | | Switzerland | |
|---|---|---|---|
| Janne Pitko | 83% | Valentin Tanner | 77% |
| Pauli Jäämies | 73% | Peter de Cruz | 92% |
| Kasper Hakunti | 67% | Claudio Pätz | 81% |
| Aku Kauste | 70% | Benoît Schwarz | 95% |
| Total | 73% | Total | 86% |

==== Bronze-medal game ====
Friday, November 27, 19:00

| Team | 1 | 2 | 3 | 4 | 5 | 6 | 7 | 8 | 9 | 10 | Final |
|---|---|---|---|---|---|---|---|---|---|---|---|
| Norway (Ulsrud) 🔨 | 1 | 2 | 0 | 2 | 0 | 1 | 0 | 1 | 0 | X | 7 |
| Finland (Kauste) | 0 | 0 | 1 | 0 | 1 | 0 | 1 | 0 | 1 | X | 4 |

Player percentages
| Norway | | Finland | |
|---|---|---|---|
| Håvard Vad Petersson | 79% | Janne Pitko | 96% |
| Christoffer Svae | 96% | Pauli Jäämies | 89% |
| Torger Nergård | 98% | Kasper Hakunti | 83% |
| Thomas Ulsrud | 92% | Aku Kauste | 84% |
| Total | 91% | Total | 88% |

==== Gold-medal game ====
Saturday, November 27, 10:00

| Team | 1 | 2 | 3 | 4 | 5 | 6 | 7 | 8 | 9 | 10 | 11 | Final |
|---|---|---|---|---|---|---|---|---|---|---|---|---|
| Sweden (Edin) | 0 | 0 | 0 | 2 | 0 | 2 | 0 | 2 | 0 | 0 | 1 | 7 |
| Switzerland (de Cruz) 🔨 | 2 | 0 | 0 | 0 | 1 | 0 | 1 | 0 | 0 | 2 | 0 | 6 |

Player percentages
| Sweden | | Switzerland | |
|---|---|---|---|
| Christoffer Sundgren | 94% | Valentin Tanner | 90% |
| Kristian Lindström | 88% | Peter de Cruz | 89% |
| Oskar Eriksson | 91% | Claudio Pätz | 85% |
| Niklas Edin | 93% | Benoît Schwarz | 93% |
| Total | 92% | Total | 89% |

=== Player percentages ===
Round Robin only

| Leads | % |
|---|---|
| (Norway) Håvard Vad Petersson | 94 |
| (Switzerland) Valentin Tanner | 89 |
| (Scotland) Cammy Smith | 88 |
| (Russia) Anton Kalalb | 88 |
| (Germany) Sebastian Schwerzer | 87 |

| Seconds | % |
|---|---|
| (Norway) Christoffer Svae | 93 |
| (Sweden) Kristian Lindström | 85 |
| (Switzerland) Peter de Cruz | 85 |
| (Scotland) Kyle Waddell | 84 |
| (Russia) Artur Razhabov | 84 |

| Thirds | % |
|---|---|
| (Norway) Torger Nergård | 90 |
| (Sweden) Oskar Eriksson | 86 |
| (Switzerland) Claudio Pätz | 85 |
| (Finland) Kasper Hakunti | 83 |
| (Italy) Joel Retornaz | 83 |

| Skips/Fourths | % |
|---|---|
| (Norway) Thomas Ulsrud | 88 |
| (Switzerland) Benoit Schwarz | 84 |
| (Sweden) Niklas Edin | 81 |
| (Russia) Alexey Stukalskiy | 81 |
| (Finland) Aku Kauste | 79 |

== Group B ==
=== Pool A ===
| Belgium | Denmark | Hungary | Lithuania |
|---|---|---|---|
| Skip: Timothy Verreycken; Third: Tom Van Waterschoot; Second: Walter Verbueken; Lead: Gregory Janbroers; Alternate: Pieter Miejlaers | Skip: Rasmus Stjerne; Third: Johnny Frederiksen; Second: Mikkel Poulsen; Lead: Troels Harry; Alternate: Oliver Dupont | Fourth: Zsolt Kiss; Skip: György Nagy; Second: Zsombor Rokusfalvy; Lead: David Balazs; Alternate: Gabor Bodor | Skip: Tadas Vyskupaitis; Third: Vytis Kulakauskas; Second: Laurynas Telksnys; Lead: Vidas Sadauskas; Alternate: Mantas Kulakauskas |
| Poland | Slovakia | Turkey | Wales |
| Fourth: Konrad Stych; Skip: Tomasz Zioło; Second: Bartosz Dzikowski; Lead: Michał Kozioł; Alternate: Jakub Głowania | Fourth: David Misun; Third: Patrik Kapralik; Skip: Juraj Gallo; Lead: Jakub Polak; Alternate: František Pitoňák | Skip: Alican Karataş; Third: Melik Şenol; Second: Uğurcan Karagöz; Lead: Muhammet Oǧuz Zengin; Alternate: Kadir Çakır | Skip: James Pougher; Third: Jamie Fletcher; Second: Rhys Phillips; Lead: Garry Coombs; Alternate: Simon Pougher |

=== Pool B ===
| Austria | Croatia | England | Estonia |
|---|---|---|---|
| Skip: Sebastian Wunderer; Third: Mathias Genner; Second: Martin Reichel; Lead: Lukas Kirchmair; Alternate: Philipp Nothegger | Skip: Alen Čadež; Third: Dražen Ćutić; Second: Ognjen Golubić; Lead: Robert Mikulandrić; Alternate: Mislav Martinić | Skip: Alan MacDougall; Third: Andrew Reed; Second: Andrew Woolston; Lead: Thomas Jaeggi; Alternate: Ben Fowler | Skip: Martin Lill; Third: Ingar Mäesalu; Second: Andres Jakobson; Lead: Johan Karlson; Alternate: Tanel Toomvali |
| Israel | Latvia | Slovenia | Spain |
| Skip: Adam Freilich; Third: Ariel Krasik-Geiger; Second: Jeff Yaakov Lutz; Lead: Gabriel Kempenich; Alternate: Leonid Rivkind | Skip: Ritvars Gulbis; Third: Normunds Šaršūns; Second: Aivars Avotiņš; Lead: Raivis Bušmanis; Alternate: Artürs Gerhards | Fourth: Gašper Uršič; Skip: Tomas Tišler; Second: Jure Čulič; Lead: Jošt Lajovec; Alternate: Gregor Verbinc | Fourth: Sergio Vez; Third: Mikel Unanue; Skip: Antonio de Mollinedo; Lead: José Manuel Sangüesa; Alternate: Eduardo de Paz |

=== Round-robin standings ===
Key
| Teams to Playoffs |
| Teams to Tiebreaker |
| Teams relegated to 2016 Group C |

Final round-robin standings

| Pool A | Skip | W | L |
|---|---|---|---|
| Denmark | Rasmus Stjerne | 7 | 0 |
| Lithuania | Tadas Vyskupaitis | 5 | 2 |
| Turkey | Alican Karataş | 4 | 3 |
| Slovenia | Tomas Tišler | 4 | 3 |
| Hungary | György Nagy | 3 | 4 |
| Poland | Tomasz Zioło | 2 | 5 |
| Wales | James Pougher | 2 | 5 |
| Belgium | Timothy Verreycken | 1 | 6 |

Final round-robin standings

| Pool B | Skip | W | L |
|---|---|---|---|
| Austria | Sebastian Wunderer | 6 | 1 |
| Latvia | Ritvars Gulbis | 6 | 1 |
| Israel | Adam Freilich | 4 | 3 |
| England | Alan MacDougall | 4 | 3 |
| Slovakia | Juraj Gallo | 3 | 4 |
| Spain | Antonio de Mollinedo | 3 | 4 |
| Croatia | Alen Čadež | 2 | 5 |
| Estonia | Martin Lill | 0 | 7 |

=== Round-robin results ===
All draw times are listed in Central European Time (UTC+01).

==== Group A ====
===== Draw 1 =====
Friday, November 20, 8:00

| Sheet A | 1 | 2 | 3 | 4 | 5 | 6 | 7 | 8 | 9 | 10 | Final |
|---|---|---|---|---|---|---|---|---|---|---|---|
| Belgium (Verreycken) | 0 | 0 | 0 | 0 | 0 | 0 | 1 | X | X | X | 1 |
| Denmark (Stjerne) 🔨 | 0 | 2 | 1 | 1 | 1 | 2 | 0 | X | X | X | 7 |

| Sheet B | 1 | 2 | 3 | 4 | 5 | 6 | 7 | 8 | 9 | 10 | Final |
|---|---|---|---|---|---|---|---|---|---|---|---|
| Poland (Zioło) | 0 | 0 | 0 | 1 | 0 | 1 | 0 | 0 | 1 | 0 | 3 |
| Lithuania (Vyskupaitis) 🔨 | 1 | 0 | 0 | 0 | 1 | 0 | 1 | 2 | 0 | 1 | 6 |

| Sheet C | 1 | 2 | 3 | 4 | 5 | 6 | 7 | 8 | 9 | 10 | Final |
|---|---|---|---|---|---|---|---|---|---|---|---|
| Turkey (Karataş) | 0 | 1 | 0 | 3 | 0 | 1 | 1 | 0 | 1 | 0 | 7 |
| Hungary (Nagy) 🔨 | 3 | 0 | 1 | 0 | 3 | 0 | 0 | 1 | 0 | 2 | 10 |

| Sheet D | 1 | 2 | 3 | 4 | 5 | 6 | 7 | 8 | 9 | 10 | Final |
|---|---|---|---|---|---|---|---|---|---|---|---|
| Wales (Pougher) | 0 | 1 | 0 | 1 | 0 | 1 | 0 | 0 | 2 | 2 | 7 |
| Slovenia (Tišler) 🔨 | 0 | 0 | 1 | 0 | 1 | 0 | 0 | 1 | 0 | 0 | 3 |

===== Draw 2 =====
Saturday, November 21, 12:00

| Sheet A | 1 | 2 | 3 | 4 | 5 | 6 | 7 | 8 | 9 | 10 | Final |
|---|---|---|---|---|---|---|---|---|---|---|---|
| Hungary (Nagy) | 0 | 0 | 2 | 0 | 3 | 0 | 2 | 1 | 0 | 0 | 8 |
| Slovenia (Tišler) 🔨 | 0 | 3 | 0 | 2 | 0 | 2 | 0 | 0 | 1 | 1 | 9 |

| Sheet B | 1 | 2 | 3 | 4 | 5 | 6 | 7 | 8 | 9 | 10 | Final |
|---|---|---|---|---|---|---|---|---|---|---|---|
| Turkey (Karataş) 🔨 | 1 | 0 | 2 | 0 | 3 | 2 | 1 | X | X | X | 9 |
| Wales (Pougher) | 0 | 1 | 0 | 2 | 0 | 0 | 0 | X | X | X | 3 |

| Sheet C | 1 | 2 | 3 | 4 | 5 | 6 | 7 | 8 | 9 | 10 | Final |
|---|---|---|---|---|---|---|---|---|---|---|---|
| Denmark (Stjerne) 🔨 | 1 | 0 | 0 | 3 | 0 | 1 | 1 | 0 | X | X | 6 |
| Lithuania (Vyskupaitis) | 0 | 0 | 1 | 0 | 0 | 0 | 0 | 1 | X | X | 2 |

| Sheet D | 1 | 2 | 3 | 4 | 5 | 6 | 7 | 8 | 9 | 10 | 11 | Final |
|---|---|---|---|---|---|---|---|---|---|---|---|---|
| Belgium (Verreycken) | 0 | 0 | 0 | 0 | 0 | 0 | 2 | 0 | 2 | 2 | 0 | 6 |
| Poland (Zioło) 🔨 | 0 | 0 | 2 | 1 | 1 | 0 | 0 | 2 | 0 | 0 | 1 | 7 |

===== Draw 3 =====
Sunday, November 22, 12:00

| Sheet A | 1 | 2 | 3 | 4 | 5 | 6 | 7 | 8 | 9 | 10 | Final |
|---|---|---|---|---|---|---|---|---|---|---|---|
| Turkey (Karataş) 🔨 | 0 | 1 | 0 | 0 | 1 | 0 | 0 | 1 | 0 | X | 3 |
| Lithuania (Vyskupaitis) | 0 | 0 | 1 | 0 | 0 | 2 | 2 | 0 | 1 | X | 6 |

| Sheet B | 1 | 2 | 3 | 4 | 5 | 6 | 7 | 8 | 9 | 10 | Final |
|---|---|---|---|---|---|---|---|---|---|---|---|
| Belgium (Verreycken) | 0 | 1 | 0 | 0 | 0 | 1 | X | X | X | X | 2 |
| Slovenia (Tišler) 🔨 | 2 | 0 | 2 | 2 | 4 | 0 | X | X | X | X | 10 |

| Sheet C | 1 | 2 | 3 | 4 | 5 | 6 | 7 | 8 | 9 | 10 | Final |
|---|---|---|---|---|---|---|---|---|---|---|---|
| Wales (Pougher) | 1 | 0 | 1 | 0 | 1 | 0 | 0 | 1 | 1 | X | 5 |
| Poland (Zioło) 🔨 | 0 | 2 | 0 | 3 | 0 | 1 | 2 | 0 | 0 | X | 8 |

| Sheet D | 1 | 2 | 3 | 4 | 5 | 6 | 7 | 8 | 9 | 10 | Final |
|---|---|---|---|---|---|---|---|---|---|---|---|
| Denmark (Stjerne) 🔨 | 0 | 0 | 3 | 0 | 1 | 0 | 0 | 1 | 0 | 1 | 6 |
| Hungary (Nagy) | 0 | 0 | 0 | 1 | 0 | 0 | 1 | 0 | 2 | 0 | 4 |

===== Draw 4 =====
Sunday, November 22, 20:00

| Sheet A | 1 | 2 | 3 | 4 | 5 | 6 | 7 | 8 | 9 | 10 | Final |
|---|---|---|---|---|---|---|---|---|---|---|---|
| Poland (Zioło) 🔨 | 0 | 0 | 0 | 0 | 0 | 1 | 0 | 1 | 0 | 0 | 2 |
| Hungary (Nagy) | 0 | 1 | 0 | 1 | 0 | 0 | 1 | 0 | 1 | 2 | 6 |

| Sheet B | 1 | 2 | 3 | 4 | 5 | 6 | 7 | 8 | 9 | 10 | Final |
|---|---|---|---|---|---|---|---|---|---|---|---|
| Wales (Pougher) | 0 | 1 | 0 | 0 | 0 | 1 | X | X | X | X | 2 |
| Denmark (Stjerne) 🔨 | 4 | 0 | 1 | 1 | 3 | 0 | X | X | X | X | 9 |

| Sheet C | 1 | 2 | 3 | 4 | 5 | 6 | 7 | 8 | 9 | 10 | 11 | Final |
|---|---|---|---|---|---|---|---|---|---|---|---|---|
| Belgium (Verreycken) | 0 | 1 | 0 | 1 | 0 | 3 | 0 | 2 | 0 | 1 | 0 | 8 |
| Turkey (Karataş) 🔨 | 1 | 0 | 1 | 0 | 3 | 0 | 1 | 0 | 2 | 0 | 1 | 9 |

| Sheet D | 1 | 2 | 3 | 4 | 5 | 6 | 7 | 8 | 9 | 10 | 11 | Final |
|---|---|---|---|---|---|---|---|---|---|---|---|---|
| Slovenia (Tišler) 🔨 | 0 | 0 | 1 | 0 | 0 | 1 | 0 | 1 | 0 | 2 | 1 | 6 |
| Lithuania (Vyskupaitis) | 1 | 0 | 0 | 0 | 1 | 0 | 2 | 0 | 1 | 0 | 0 | 5 |

===== Draw 5 =====
Monday, November 23, 16:00

| Sheet A | 1 | 2 | 3 | 4 | 5 | 6 | 7 | 8 | 9 | 10 | Final |
|---|---|---|---|---|---|---|---|---|---|---|---|
| Wales (Pougher) | 0 | 1 | 3 | 0 | 1 | 0 | 1 | 1 | 0 | X | 7 |
| Belgium (Verreycken) 🔨 | 2 | 0 | 0 | 2 | 0 | 1 | 0 | 0 | 4 | X | 9 |

| Sheet B | 1 | 2 | 3 | 4 | 5 | 6 | 7 | 8 | 9 | 10 | Final |
|---|---|---|---|---|---|---|---|---|---|---|---|
| Lithuania (Vyskupaitis) | 0 | 0 | 1 | 0 | 0 | 0 | 2 | 1 | 1 | 0 | 5 |
| Hungary (Nagy) 🔨 | 1 | 0 | 0 | 0 | 1 | 0 | 0 | 0 | 0 | 1 | 3 |

| Sheet C | 1 | 2 | 3 | 4 | 5 | 6 | 7 | 8 | 9 | 10 | Final |
|---|---|---|---|---|---|---|---|---|---|---|---|
| Poland (Zioło) 🔨 | 1 | 0 | 0 | 1 | 0 | 1 | 0 | X | X | X | 3 |
| Slovenia (Tišler) | 0 | 4 | 2 | 0 | 2 | 0 | 1 | X | X | X | 9 |

| Sheet D | 1 | 2 | 3 | 4 | 5 | 6 | 7 | 8 | 9 | 10 | Final |
|---|---|---|---|---|---|---|---|---|---|---|---|
| Turkey (Karataş) | 0 | 0 | 1 | 0 | 0 | 0 | 1 | 0 | 0 | X | 2 |
| Denmark (Stjerne) 🔨 | 2 | 0 | 0 | 2 | 0 | 0 | 0 | 3 | 1 | X | 8 |

===== Draw 6 =====
Tuesday, November 24, 8:00

| Sheet A | 1 | 2 | 3 | 4 | 5 | 6 | 7 | 8 | 9 | 10 | Final |
|---|---|---|---|---|---|---|---|---|---|---|---|
| Denmark (Stjerne) | 0 | 2 | 1 | 0 | 4 | 0 | 3 | X | X | X | 10 |
| Poland (Zioło) 🔨 | 0 | 0 | 0 | 1 | 0 | 1 | 0 | X | X | X | 2 |

| Sheet B | 1 | 2 | 3 | 4 | 5 | 6 | 7 | 8 | 9 | 10 | Final |
|---|---|---|---|---|---|---|---|---|---|---|---|
| Slovenia (Tišler) | 0 | 1 | 0 | 0 | 0 | 0 | 0 | X | X | X | 1 |
| Turkey (Karataş) 🔨 | 1 | 0 | 1 | 3 | 1 | 1 | 1 | X | X | X | 8 |

| Sheet C | 1 | 2 | 3 | 4 | 5 | 6 | 7 | 8 | 9 | 10 | Final |
|---|---|---|---|---|---|---|---|---|---|---|---|
| Lithuania (Vyskupaitis) | 0 | 2 | 0 | 0 | 0 | 1 | 0 | 0 | 1 | 1 | 5 |
| Belgium (Verreycken) 🔨 | 1 | 0 | 1 | 0 | 0 | 0 | 1 | 1 | 0 | 0 | 4 |

| Sheet D | 1 | 2 | 3 | 4 | 5 | 6 | 7 | 8 | 9 | 10 | Final |
|---|---|---|---|---|---|---|---|---|---|---|---|
| Hungary (Nagy) | 0 | 2 | 0 | 3 | 0 | 1 | 0 | 2 | 0 | 0 | 8 |
| Wales (Pougher) 🔨 | 2 | 0 | 2 | 0 | 1 | 0 | 3 | 0 | 1 | 1 | 10 |

===== Draw 7 =====
Wednesday, November 25, 16:00

| Sheet A | 1 | 2 | 3 | 4 | 5 | 6 | 7 | 8 | 9 | 10 | Final |
|---|---|---|---|---|---|---|---|---|---|---|---|
| Lithuania (Vyskupaitis) 🔨 | 0 | 1 | 0 | 0 | 1 | 0 | 0 | 1 | 1 | 1 | 5 |
| Wales (Pougher) | 0 | 0 | 0 | 1 | 0 | 0 | 1 | 0 | 0 | 0 | 2 |

| Sheet B | 1 | 2 | 3 | 4 | 5 | 6 | 7 | 8 | 9 | 10 | Final |
|---|---|---|---|---|---|---|---|---|---|---|---|
| Hungary (Nagy) | 0 | 2 | 1 | 0 | 0 | 2 | 0 | 0 | 2 | X | 7 |
| Belgium (Verreycken) 🔨 | 2 | 0 | 0 | 2 | 0 | 0 | 0 | 0 | 0 | X | 4 |

| Sheet C | 1 | 2 | 3 | 4 | 5 | 6 | 7 | 8 | 9 | 10 | Final |
|---|---|---|---|---|---|---|---|---|---|---|---|
| Slovenia (Tišler) 🔨 | 1 | 0 | 0 | 1 | 0 | 1 | 0 | X | X | X | 3 |
| Denmark (Stjerne) | 0 | 1 | 2 | 0 | 4 | 0 | 3 | X | X | X | 10 |

| Sheet D | 1 | 2 | 3 | 4 | 5 | 6 | 7 | 8 | 9 | 10 | Final |
|---|---|---|---|---|---|---|---|---|---|---|---|
| Poland (Zioło) | 0 | 0 | 0 | 0 | 0 | 1 | 1 | 0 | 0 | X | 2 |
| Turkey (Karataş) 🔨 | 0 | 0 | 1 | 1 | 2 | 0 | 0 | 1 | 1 | X | 6 |

==== Group B ====
===== Draw 1 =====
Friday, November 20, 17:30

| Sheet A | 1 | 2 | 3 | 4 | 5 | 6 | 7 | 8 | 9 | 10 | Final |
|---|---|---|---|---|---|---|---|---|---|---|---|
| Latvia (Gulbis) | 0 | 0 | 2 | 0 | 1 | 0 | 1 | 0 | 1 | 0 | 5 |
| Austria (Wunderer) 🔨 | 0 | 1 | 0 | 2 | 0 | 1 | 0 | 1 | 0 | 1 | 6 |

| Sheet B | 1 | 2 | 3 | 4 | 5 | 6 | 7 | 8 | 9 | 10 | 11 | Final |
|---|---|---|---|---|---|---|---|---|---|---|---|---|
| Croatia (Čadež) 🔨 | 1 | 1 | 0 | 0 | 2 | 0 | 2 | 1 | 0 | 0 | 4 | 11 |
| Spain (Mollinedo) | 0 | 0 | 2 | 1 | 0 | 1 | 0 | 0 | 2 | 1 | 0 | 7 |

| Sheet C | 1 | 2 | 3 | 4 | 5 | 6 | 7 | 8 | 9 | 10 | Final |
|---|---|---|---|---|---|---|---|---|---|---|---|
| England (MacDougall) 🔨 | 1 | 0 | 1 | 0 | 0 | 2 | 0 | 0 | 2 | 1 | 7 |
| Estonia (Lill) | 0 | 1 | 0 | 1 | 1 | 0 | 1 | 1 | 0 | 0 | 5 |

| Sheet D | 1 | 2 | 3 | 4 | 5 | 6 | 7 | 8 | 9 | 10 | Final |
|---|---|---|---|---|---|---|---|---|---|---|---|
| Israel (Freilich) 🔨 | 0 | 1 | 0 | 0 | 1 | 0 | 0 | 2 | 1 | X | 5 |
| Slovakia (Gallo) | 0 | 0 | 0 | 2 | 0 | 1 | 0 | 0 | 0 | X | 3 |

===== Draw 2 =====
Saturday, November 21, 20:00

| Sheet A | 1 | 2 | 3 | 4 | 5 | 6 | 7 | 8 | 9 | 10 | Final |
|---|---|---|---|---|---|---|---|---|---|---|---|
| Estonia (Lill) | 0 | 1 | 0 | 0 | 0 | 1 | 1 | 1 | 1 | X | 5 |
| Slovakia (Gallo) 🔨 | 2 | 0 | 3 | 0 | 2 | 0 | 0 | 0 | 0 | X | 7 |

| Sheet B | 1 | 2 | 3 | 4 | 5 | 6 | 7 | 8 | 9 | 10 | Final |
|---|---|---|---|---|---|---|---|---|---|---|---|
| England (MacDougall) | 0 | 1 | 0 | 1 | 0 | 0 | 2 | 0 | 0 | 0 | 4 |
| Israel (Freilich) 🔨 | 1 | 0 | 1 | 0 | 1 | 0 | 0 | 0 | 2 | 3 | 8 |

| Sheet C | 1 | 2 | 3 | 4 | 5 | 6 | 7 | 8 | 9 | 10 | Final |
|---|---|---|---|---|---|---|---|---|---|---|---|
| Austria (Wunderer) 🔨 | 1 | 0 | 1 | 0 | 1 | 0 | 1 | 0 | 1 | 1 | 6 |
| Spain (Mollinedo) | 0 | 1 | 0 | 1 | 0 | 0 | 0 | 1 | 0 | 0 | 3 |

| Sheet D | 1 | 2 | 3 | 4 | 5 | 6 | 7 | 8 | 9 | 10 | Final |
|---|---|---|---|---|---|---|---|---|---|---|---|
| Latvia (Gulbis) 🔨 | 3 | 0 | 4 | 1 | 0 | 2 | X | X | X | X | 10 |
| Croatia (Čadež) | 0 | 1 | 0 | 0 | 1 | 0 | X | X | X | X | 2 |

===== Draw 3 =====
Sunday, November 22, 16:00

| Sheet A | 1 | 2 | 3 | 4 | 5 | 6 | 7 | 8 | 9 | 10 | Final |
|---|---|---|---|---|---|---|---|---|---|---|---|
| England (MacDougall) | 0 | 0 | 1 | 0 | 0 | 1 | 0 | 0 | X | X | 2 |
| Spain (Mollinedo) 🔨 | 1 | 1 | 0 | 2 | 1 | 0 | 2 | 1 | X | X | 8 |

| Sheet B | 1 | 2 | 3 | 4 | 5 | 6 | 7 | 8 | 9 | 10 | Final |
|---|---|---|---|---|---|---|---|---|---|---|---|
| Latvia (Gulbis) 🔨 | 0 | 3 | 1 | 0 | 0 | 2 | 2 | X | X | X | 8 |
| Slovakia (Gallo) | 0 | 0 | 0 | 1 | 1 | 0 | 0 | X | X | X | 2 |

| Sheet C | 1 | 2 | 3 | 4 | 5 | 6 | 7 | 8 | 9 | 10 | Final |
|---|---|---|---|---|---|---|---|---|---|---|---|
| Israel (Freilich) | 0 | 1 | 0 | 0 | 3 | 0 | 3 | 1 | 2 | X | 10 |
| Croatia (Čadež) 🔨 | 2 | 0 | 0 | 1 | 0 | 2 | 0 | 0 | 0 | X | 5 |

| Sheet D | 1 | 2 | 3 | 4 | 5 | 6 | 7 | 8 | 9 | 10 | Final |
|---|---|---|---|---|---|---|---|---|---|---|---|
| Austria (Wunderer) 🔨 | 2 | 3 | 0 | 0 | 1 | 1 | 0 | 1 | X | X | 8 |
| Estonia (Lill) | 0 | 0 | 0 | 1 | 0 | 0 | 2 | 0 | X | X | 3 |

===== Draw 4 =====
Monday, November 23, 8:00

| Sheet A | 1 | 2 | 3 | 4 | 5 | 6 | 7 | 8 | 9 | 10 | Final |
|---|---|---|---|---|---|---|---|---|---|---|---|
| Croatia (Čadež) 🔨 | 0 | 1 | 0 | 0 | 1 | 0 | 2 | 0 | 1 | 1 | 6 |
| Estonia (Lill) | 1 | 0 | 1 | 1 | 0 | 1 | 0 | 1 | 0 | 0 | 5 |

| Sheet B | 1 | 2 | 3 | 4 | 5 | 6 | 7 | 8 | 9 | 10 | Final |
|---|---|---|---|---|---|---|---|---|---|---|---|
| Israel (Freilich) 🔨 | 2 | 0 | 0 | 0 | 0 | 1 | 0 | 1 | 0 | X | 4 |
| Austria (Wunderer) | 0 | 3 | 0 | 0 | 0 | 0 | 2 | 0 | 1 | X | 6 |

| Sheet C | 1 | 2 | 3 | 4 | 5 | 6 | 7 | 8 | 9 | 10 | Final |
|---|---|---|---|---|---|---|---|---|---|---|---|
| Latvia (Gulbis) | 0 | 3 | 0 | 1 | 0 | 0 | 1 | 2 | 0 | 0 | 7 |
| England (MacDougall) 🔨 | 2 | 0 | 1 | 0 | 0 | 1 | 0 | 0 | 1 | 1 | 6 |

| Sheet D | 1 | 2 | 3 | 4 | 5 | 6 | 7 | 8 | 9 | 10 | Final |
|---|---|---|---|---|---|---|---|---|---|---|---|
| Slovakia (Gallo) 🔨 | 1 | 0 | 2 | 1 | 0 | 2 | 1 | 1 | X | X | 8 |
| Spain (Mollinedo) | 0 | 2 | 0 | 0 | 1 | 0 | 0 | 0 | X | X | 3 |

===== Draw 5 =====
Tuesday, November 24, 16:00

| Sheet A | 1 | 2 | 3 | 4 | 5 | 6 | 7 | 8 | 9 | 10 | Final |
|---|---|---|---|---|---|---|---|---|---|---|---|
| Israel (Freilich) | 0 | 0 | 0 | 0 | 0 | 1 | 0 | X | X | X | 1 |
| Latvia (Gulbis) 🔨 | 1 | 0 | 2 | 2 | 4 | 0 | 1 | X | X | X | 10 |

| Sheet B | 1 | 2 | 3 | 4 | 5 | 6 | 7 | 8 | 9 | 10 | 11 | Final |
|---|---|---|---|---|---|---|---|---|---|---|---|---|
| Spain (Mollinedo) 🔨 | 1 | 1 | 0 | 3 | 1 | 0 | 0 | 1 | 0 | 0 | 1 | 8 |
| Estonia (Lill) | 0 | 0 | 2 | 0 | 0 | 1 | 1 | 0 | 2 | 1 | 0 | 7 |

| Sheet C | 1 | 2 | 3 | 4 | 5 | 6 | 7 | 8 | 9 | 10 | Final |
|---|---|---|---|---|---|---|---|---|---|---|---|
| Croatia (Čadež) 🔨 | 1 | 0 | 1 | 0 | 1 | 0 | 1 | 0 | 3 | 0 | 7 |
| Slovakia (Gallo) | 0 | 2 | 0 | 3 | 0 | 3 | 0 | 0 | 0 | 1 | 9 |

| Sheet D | 1 | 2 | 3 | 4 | 5 | 6 | 7 | 8 | 9 | 10 | Final |
|---|---|---|---|---|---|---|---|---|---|---|---|
| England (MacDougall) | 0 | 0 | 5 | 0 | 1 | 0 | 1 | 1 | 0 | 1 | 9 |
| Austria (Wunderer) 🔨 | 1 | 1 | 0 | 3 | 0 | 2 | 0 | 0 | 1 | 0 | 8 |

===== Draw 6 =====
Wednesday, November 25, 8:00

| Sheet A | 1 | 2 | 3 | 4 | 5 | 6 | 7 | 8 | 9 | 10 | Final |
|---|---|---|---|---|---|---|---|---|---|---|---|
| Austria (Wunderer) | 1 | 0 | 3 | 0 | 3 | 0 | 4 | X | X | X | 11 |
| Croatia (Čadež) 🔨 | 0 | 1 | 0 | 1 | 0 | 2 | 0 | X | X | X | 4 |

| Sheet B | 1 | 2 | 3 | 4 | 5 | 6 | 7 | 8 | 9 | 10 | Final |
|---|---|---|---|---|---|---|---|---|---|---|---|
| Slovakia (Gallo) | 0 | 1 | 0 | 1 | 0 | 1 | 3 | 0 | 0 | X | 6 |
| England (MacDougall) 🔨 | 1 | 0 | 2 | 0 | 2 | 0 | 0 | 2 | 1 | X | 8 |

| Sheet C | 1 | 2 | 3 | 4 | 5 | 6 | 7 | 8 | 9 | 10 | Final |
|---|---|---|---|---|---|---|---|---|---|---|---|
| Spain (Mollinedo) | 0 | 0 | 1 | 0 | 0 | 3 | 0 | 1 | 0 | 1 | 6 |
| Latvia (Gulbis) 🔨 | 2 | 1 | 0 | 3 | 0 | 0 | 1 | 0 | 1 | 0 | 8 |

| Sheet D | 1 | 2 | 3 | 4 | 5 | 6 | 7 | 8 | 9 | 10 | Final |
|---|---|---|---|---|---|---|---|---|---|---|---|
| Estonia (Lill) | 0 | 0 | 0 | 1 | 0 | 1 | 0 | 0 | 0 | X | 2 |
| Israel (Freilich) 🔨 | 1 | 1 | 1 | 0 | 1 | 0 | 0 | 2 | 2 | X | 8 |

===== Draw 7 =====
Thursday, November 26, 8:00

| Sheet A | 1 | 2 | 3 | 4 | 5 | 6 | 7 | 8 | 9 | 10 | 11 | Final |
|---|---|---|---|---|---|---|---|---|---|---|---|---|
| Spain (Mollinedo) 🔨 | 2 | 0 | 0 | 2 | 0 | 0 | 1 | 0 | 1 | 0 | 1 | 7 |
| Israel (Freilich) | 0 | 0 | 1 | 0 | 2 | 1 | 0 | 1 | 0 | 1 | 0 | 6 |

| Sheet B | 1 | 2 | 3 | 4 | 5 | 6 | 7 | 8 | 9 | 10 | Final |
|---|---|---|---|---|---|---|---|---|---|---|---|
| Estonia (Lill) 🔨 | 0 | 0 | 1 | 0 | 0 | 1 | 0 | 1 | X | X | 3 |
| Latvia (Gulbis) | 1 | 2 | 0 | 0 | 2 | 0 | 2 | 0 | X | X | 7 |

| Sheet C | 1 | 2 | 3 | 4 | 5 | 6 | 7 | 8 | 9 | 10 | Final |
|---|---|---|---|---|---|---|---|---|---|---|---|
| Slovakia (Gallo) | 0 | 0 | 0 | 0 | 0 | 2 | 0 | X | X | X | 2 |
| Austria (Wunderer) 🔨 | 1 | 3 | 0 | 1 | 4 | 0 | 3 | X | X | X | 12 |

| Sheet D | 1 | 2 | 3 | 4 | 5 | 6 | 7 | 8 | 9 | 10 | Final |
|---|---|---|---|---|---|---|---|---|---|---|---|
| Croatia (Čadež) 🔨 | 0 | 1 | 0 | 0 | 1 | 0 | 0 | 2 | 0 | X | 4 |
| England (MacDougall) | 1 | 0 | 0 | 2 | 0 | 0 | 2 | 0 | 3 | X | 8 |

=== Tiebreakers ===
Thursday, November 26, 12:00

| Team | 1 | 2 | 3 | 4 | 5 | 6 | 7 | 8 | 9 | 10 | Final |
|---|---|---|---|---|---|---|---|---|---|---|---|
| Slovenia (Tišler) | 0 | 2 | 0 | 0 | 1 | 0 | 2 | 2 | 0 | X | 7 |
| Turkey (Karataş) 🔨 | 1 | 0 | 0 | 1 | 0 | 1 | 0 | 0 | 1 | X | 4 |

Thursday, November 26, 16:00

| Team | 1 | 2 | 3 | 4 | 5 | 6 | 7 | 8 | 9 | 10 | Final |
|---|---|---|---|---|---|---|---|---|---|---|---|
| Israel (Freilich) 🔨 | 0 | 0 | 2 | 0 | 1 | 2 | 0 | 3 | X | X | 8 |
| England (MacDougall) | 0 | 0 | 0 | 1 | 0 | 0 | 1 | 0 | X | X | 2 |

=== Relegation round ===
Relegation Finals
B7 | Croatia | 8
A8 | Belgium | 10

Relegation Semifinals
A7 | Wales | 10
B7 | Croatia | 4
A8 | Belgium | 6
B8 | Estonia | 5

==== Relegation Semifinals ====
Friday, November 27, 9:00

| Team | 1 | 2 | 3 | 4 | 5 | 6 | 7 | 8 | 9 | 10 | Final |
|---|---|---|---|---|---|---|---|---|---|---|---|
| Wales (Pougher) 🔨 | 4 | 0 | 1 | 0 | 2 | 0 | 0 | 3 | X | X | 10 |
| Croatia (Čadež) | 0 | 1 | 0 | 1 | 0 | 1 | 1 | 0 | X | X | 4 |

| Team | 1 | 2 | 3 | 4 | 5 | 6 | 7 | 8 | 9 | 10 | 11 | Final |
|---|---|---|---|---|---|---|---|---|---|---|---|---|
| Belgium (Verreycken) 🔨 | 1 | 2 | 0 | 0 | 1 | 0 | 0 | 0 | 1 | 0 | 1 | 6 |
| Estonia (Lill) | 0 | 0 | 0 | 1 | 0 | 2 | 0 | 1 | 0 | 1 | 0 | 5 |

==== Relegation Final ====
Saturday, November 28, 9:00

| Team | 1 | 2 | 3 | 4 | 5 | 6 | 7 | 8 | 9 | 10 | Final |
|---|---|---|---|---|---|---|---|---|---|---|---|
| Croatia (Čadež) | 0 | 2 | 0 | 0 | 0 | 2 | 0 | 4 | 0 | 0 | 8 |
| Belgium (Verreycken) 🔨 | 2 | 0 | 0 | 1 | 2 | 0 | 1 | 0 | 2 | 2 | 10 |

=== Playoffs ===
Quarterfinals
B2 | Latvia | 8
A3 | Slovenia | 2
A2 | Lithuania | 7
B3 | Israel | 9

Semifinals
A1 | Denmark | 10
B2 | Latvia | 5
B1 | Austria | 7
B3 | Israel | 4

Final
A1 | Denmark | 6
B1 | Austria | 4

| Bronze-medal game |
| B2 | Latvia | 13 |
| B3 | Israel | 3 |

==== Quarterfinals ====
Thursday, November 26, 20:00

| Team | 1 | 2 | 3 | 4 | 5 | 6 | 7 | 8 | 9 | 10 | Final |
|---|---|---|---|---|---|---|---|---|---|---|---|
| Latvia (Gulbis) 🔨 | 1 | 0 | 2 | 0 | 0 | 2 | 0 | 1 | 2 | X | 8 |
| Slovenia (Tišler) | 0 | 0 | 0 | 0 | 1 | 0 | 1 | 0 | 0 | X | 2 |

| Team | 1 | 2 | 3 | 4 | 5 | 6 | 7 | 8 | 9 | 10 | 11 | Final |
|---|---|---|---|---|---|---|---|---|---|---|---|---|
| Lithuania (Vyskupaitis) 🔨 | 0 | 0 | 4 | 0 | 1 | 0 | 0 | 0 | 1 | 1 | 0 | 7 |
| Israel (Freilich) | 0 | 1 | 0 | 2 | 0 | 1 | 2 | 1 | 0 | 0 | 2 | 9 |

==== Semifinals ====
Friday, November 27, 9:00

| Team | 1 | 2 | 3 | 4 | 5 | 6 | 7 | 8 | 9 | 10 | Final |
|---|---|---|---|---|---|---|---|---|---|---|---|
| Denmark (Stjerne) 🔨 | 2 | 0 | 3 | 0 | 2 | 0 | 1 | 0 | 2 | X | 10 |
| Latvia (Gulbis) | 0 | 1 | 0 | 1 | 0 | 1 | 0 | 2 | 0 | X | 5 |

| Team | 1 | 2 | 3 | 4 | 5 | 6 | 7 | 8 | 9 | 10 | Final |
|---|---|---|---|---|---|---|---|---|---|---|---|
| Austria (Wunderer) 🔨 | 0 | 0 | 3 | 0 | 0 | 3 | 0 | 0 | 1 | X | 7 |
| Israel (Freilich) | 0 | 0 | 0 | 2 | 0 | 0 | 1 | 1 | 0 | X | 4 |

==== Bronze-medal game ====
Friday, November 27, 13:30

| Team | 1 | 2 | 3 | 4 | 5 | 6 | 7 | 8 | 9 | 10 | Final |
|---|---|---|---|---|---|---|---|---|---|---|---|
| Latvia (Gulbis) 🔨 | 3 | 1 | 0 | 1 | 4 | 0 | 2 | 2 | X | X | 13 |
| Israel (Freilich) | 0 | 0 | 1 | 0 | 0 | 2 | 0 | 0 | X | X | 3 |

==== Gold-medal game ====
Friday, November 27, 13:30

| Team | 1 | 2 | 3 | 4 | 5 | 6 | 7 | 8 | 9 | 10 | Final |
|---|---|---|---|---|---|---|---|---|---|---|---|
| Denmark (Stjerne) | 0 | 1 | 2 | 0 | 0 | 2 | 0 | 1 | 0 | X | 6 |
| Austria (Wunderer) 🔨 | 0 | 0 | 0 | 1 | 1 | 0 | 1 | 0 | 1 | X | 4 |

== Group C ==
=== Teams ===
| Andorra | Belarus | Bulgaria | France |
|---|---|---|---|
| Skip: Josep Garcia; Third: Oscar Zazo; Second: Josep Caubet; Lead: Oscar Garcia | Skip: Pavel Petrov; Third: Dmitry Barkan; Second: Andrei Yurkevich; Lead: Mikalai Kryshtopa; Alternate: Ilya Kazlouski | Skip: Reto Seiler; Third: Bojidar Momerin; Second: Nikolay Runtov; Lead: Petar Tchakarov; Alternate: Velinov Stanko | Skip: Wilfrid Coulot; Third: Jean-Olivier Biechely; Second: Louis Pizon; Lead: Simon Pagnot; Alternate: Sylvain Mouterde |
| Iceland | Ireland | Luxembourg | Romania |
| Fourth: Kristján Porkelsson; Third: Kristjan Bjarnason; Skip: Olafur Hreinsson; Lead: Runar Steingrimsson | Skip: James Russell; Third: John Furey; Second: Craig Whyte; Lead: Eoin McCrossan | Skip: Marc Hansen; Third: Kyle Edwards; Second: Ian Munn; Lead: Alex Benoy; Alternate: Philippe Husi | Skip: Allen Coliban; Third: Valentin Anghelinei; Second: Attila Gall; Lead: Cristian Matau |
| Serbia | Slovakia | Slovenia | |
| Fourth: Đorđe Nešković; Skip: Bojan Mijatović; Second: Goran Ungurović; Lead: Filip Stojanović; Alternate: Marko Stojanović | Fourth: David Misun; Third: Patrik Kapralik; Skip: Juraj Gallo; Lead: Jakub Polak; Alternate: František Pitoňák | Fourth: Gašper Uršič; Skip: Tomas Tišler; Second: Jure Čulič; Lead: Jošt Lajovec; Alternate: Gregor Verbinc | |

=== Round-robin standings ===
Final round-robin standings

Key
| Teams to Playoffs |

| Country | Skip | W | L |
|---|---|---|---|
| Slovakia | Juraj Gallo | 9 | 1 |
| Slovenia | Tomas Tišler | 8 | 2 |
| France | Wilfrid Coulot | 7 | 3 |
| Ireland | James Russell | 7 | 3 |
| Serbia | Bojan Mijatović | 6 | 4 |
| Bulgaria | Reto Seiler | 5 | 5 |
| Belarus | Pavel Petrov | 5 | 5 |
| Luxembourg | Marc Hansen | 4 | 6 |
| Romania | Allen Coliban | 3 | 7 |
| Iceland | Olafur Hreinsson | 1 | 9 |
| Andorra | Josep Garcia | 0 | 10 |

=== Round-robin results ===
==== Draw 1 ====
Monday, October 12, 16:30

| Sheet A | 1 | 2 | 3 | 4 | 5 | 6 | 7 | 8 | Final |
| Ireland (Russell) | 1 | 2 | 1 | 2 | 3 | 0 | 2 | X | 11 |
| Andorra (Garcia) 🔨 | 0 | 0 | 0 | 0 | 0 | 1 | 0 | X | 1 |

| Sheet B | 1 | 2 | 3 | 4 | 5 | 6 | 7 | 8 | Final |
| Slovakia (Gallo) 🔨 | 0 | 0 | 1 | 2 | 3 | 0 | 1 | X | 7 |
| Serbia (Mijatović) | 0 | 0 | 0 | 0 | 0 | 2 | 0 | X | 2 |

| Sheet C | 1 | 2 | 3 | 4 | 5 | 6 | 7 | 8 | Final |
| Belarus (Petrov) 🔨 | 1 | 0 | 0 | 1 | 0 | 0 | 1 | X | 3 |
| Slovenia (Tišler) | 0 | 0 | 1 | 0 | 4 | 1 | 0 | X | 6 |

| Sheet D | 1 | 2 | 3 | 4 | 5 | 6 | 7 | 8 | Final |
| Bulgaria (Seiler) | 0 | 0 | 2 | 1 | 1 | 1 | 0 | 1 | 6 |
| Romania (Coliban) 🔨 | 1 | 2 | 0 | 0 | 0 | 0 | 1 | 0 | 4 |

| Sheet E | 1 | 2 | 3 | 4 | 5 | 6 | 7 | 8 | Final |
| Iceland (Hreinsson) 🔨 | 1 | 0 | 1 | 0 | 1 | 0 | 0 | X | 3 |
| Luxembourg (Hansen) | 0 | 1 | 0 | 1 | 0 | 4 | 1 | X | 7 |

==== Draw 2 ====
Tuesday, October 13, 8:00

| Sheet A | 1 | 2 | 3 | 4 | 5 | 6 | 7 | 8 | Final |
| France (Coulot) | 1 | 2 | 2 | 1 | 1 | 0 | 2 | X | 9 |
| Belarus (Petrov) 🔨 | 0 | 0 | 0 | 0 | 0 | 2 | 0 | X | 2 |

| Sheet B | 1 | 2 | 3 | 4 | 5 | 6 | 7 | 8 | Final |
| Iceland (Hreinsson) 🔨 | 3 | 2 | 0 | 0 | 0 | 0 | 5 | 1 | 11 |
| Andorra (Garcia) | 0 | 0 | 2 | 1 | 1 | 2 | 0 | 0 | 6 |

| Sheet C | 1 | 2 | 3 | 4 | 5 | 6 | 7 | 8 | Final |
| Romania (Coliban) | 0 | 1 | 0 | 1 | 0 | 0 | 3 | 0 | 5 |
| Ireland (Russell) 🔨 | 1 | 0 | 1 | 0 | 0 | 3 | 0 | 3 | 8 |

| Sheet D | 1 | 2 | 3 | 4 | 5 | 6 | 7 | 8 | Final |
| Slovenia (Tišler) | 0 | 0 | 5 | 0 | 0 | 2 | 0 | 2 | 9 |
| Luxembourg (Hansen) 🔨 | 1 | 2 | 0 | 1 | 2 | 0 | 1 | 0 | 7 |

| Sheet E | 1 | 2 | 3 | 4 | 5 | 6 | 7 | 8 | Final |
| Bulgaria (Seiler) | 0 | 0 | 0 | 0 | 2 | 0 | 0 | X | 2 |
| Slovakia (Gallo) 🔨 | 1 | 2 | 1 | 0 | 2 | 4 | X | X | 10 |

==== Draw 4 ====
Tuesday, October 13, 16:00

| Sheet A | 1 | 2 | 3 | 4 | 5 | 6 | 7 | 8 | Final |
| Serbia (Mijatović) | 0 | 0 | 2 | 0 | 1 | 0 | 0 | X | 3 |
| Romania (Coliban) 🔨 | 4 | 1 | 0 | 2 | 0 | 1 | 2 | X | 10 |

| Sheet B | 1 | 2 | 3 | 4 | 5 | 6 | 7 | 8 | Final |
| Ireland (Russell) | 0 | 1 | 0 | 1 | 0 | 0 | 3 | 2 | 7 |
| Bulgaria (Seiler) 🔨 | 1 | 0 | 1 | 0 | 1 | 0 | 0 | 0 | 3 |

| Sheet C | 1 | 2 | 3 | 4 | 5 | 6 | 7 | 8 | Final |
| France (Coulot) | 0 | 0 | 1 | 0 | 1 | 0 | 0 | X | 2 |
| Slovakia (Gallo) 🔨 | 1 | 1 | 0 | 2 | 0 | 1 | 1 | X | 6 |

| Sheet D | 1 | 2 | 3 | 4 | 5 | 6 | 7 | 8 | Final |
| Iceland (Hreinsson) 🔨 | 0 | 2 | 0 | 2 | 0 | 1 | 0 | X | 5 |
| Belarus (Petrov) | 2 | 0 | 3 | 0 | 4 | 0 | 2 | X | 11 |

| Sheet E | 1 | 2 | 3 | 4 | 5 | 6 | 7 | 8 | Final |
| Andorra (Garcia) 🔨 | 1 | 0 | 0 | 0 | 0 | 0 | X | X | 1 |
| Slovenia (Tišler) | 0 | 3 | 2 | 3 | 2 | 0 | X | X | 10 |

==== Draw 5 ====
Tuesday, October 13, 20:00

| Sheet A | 1 | 2 | 3 | 4 | 5 | 6 | 7 | 8 | Final |
| Bulgaria (Seiler) | 0 | 2 | 3 | 1 | 0 | 3 | X | X | 9 |
| Iceland (Hreinsson) 🔨 | 2 | 0 | 0 | 0 | 1 | 0 | X | X | 3 |

| Sheet B | 1 | 2 | 3 | 4 | 5 | 6 | 7 | 8 | Final |
| Romania (Coliban) 🔨 | 1 | 0 | 1 | 0 | 1 | 0 | X | X | 3 |
| Slovenia (Tišler) | 0 | 5 | 0 | 3 | 0 | 3 | X | X | 11 |

| Sheet C | 1 | 2 | 3 | 4 | 5 | 6 | 7 | 8 | Final |
| Luxembourg (Hansen) | 0 | 1 | 0 | 0 | 3 | 1 | 0 | 0 | 5 |
| Serbia (Mijatović) 🔨 | 1 | 0 | 2 | 0 | 0 | 0 | 3 | 1 | 7 |

| Sheet D | 1 | 2 | 3 | 4 | 5 | 6 | 7 | 8 | Final |
| Slovakia (Gallo) 🔨 | 0 | 2 | 0 | 3 | 4 | 0 | X | X | 9 |
| Andorra (Garcia) | 1 | 0 | 1 | 0 | 0 | 0 | X | X | 2 |

| Sheet E | 1 | 2 | 3 | 4 | 5 | 6 | 7 | 8 | Final |
| Ireland (Russell) 🔨 | 0 | 0 | 0 | 0 | 0 | 1 | X | X | 1 |
| France (Coulot) | 1 | 2 | 1 | 2 | 2 | 0 | X | X | 8 |

==== Draw 7 ====
Wednesday, October 14, 12:00

| Sheet A | 1 | 2 | 3 | 4 | 5 | 6 | 7 | 8 | Final |
| Slovakia (Gallo) | 0 | 2 | 2 | 0 | 0 | 0 | 1 | X | 5 |
| Slovenia (Tišler) 🔨 | 2 | 0 | 0 | 0 | 0 | 1 | 0 | X | 3 |

| Sheet B | 1 | 2 | 3 | 4 | 5 | 6 | 7 | 8 | Final |
| France (Coulot) 🔨 | 1 | 2 | 0 | 1 | 1 | 2 | 0 | X | 7 |
| Luxembourg (Hansen) | 0 | 0 | 1 | 0 | 0 | 0 | 2 | X | 3 |

| Sheet C | 1 | 2 | 3 | 4 | 5 | 6 | 7 | 8 | Final |
| Bulgaria (Seiler) | 0 | 2 | 1 | 0 | 2 | 2 | 2 | X | 9 |
| Andorra (Garcia) 🔨 | 1 | 0 | 0 | 1 | 0 | 0 | 0 | X | 2 |

| Sheet D | 1 | 2 | 3 | 4 | 5 | 6 | 7 | 8 | Final |
| Serbia (Mijatović) | 0 | 1 | 3 | 0 | 1 | 0 | 1 | 1 | 7 |
| Ireland (Russell) | 1 | 0 | 0 | 0 | 0 | 3 | 0 | 0 | 4 |

| Sheet E | 1 | 2 | 3 | 4 | 5 | 6 | 7 | 8 | Final |
| Romania (Coliban) | 0 | 1 | 0 | 0 | 0 | 1 | 0 | X | 2 |
| Belarus (Petrov) 🔨 | 0 | 0 | 1 | 1 | 2 | 0 | 1 | X | 5 |

==== Draw 9 ====
Wednesday, October 14, 20:00

| Sheet A | 1 | 2 | 3 | 4 | 5 | 6 | 7 | 8 | Final |
| Andorra (Garcia) 🔨 | 0 | 1 | 0 | 0 | 1 | 0 | 0 | 0 | 2 |
| Luxembourg (Hansen) | 1 | 0 | 1 | 2 | 0 | 1 | 4 | 1 | 10 |

| Sheet B | 1 | 2 | 3 | 4 | 5 | 6 | 7 | 8 | Final |
| Belarus (Petrov) | 0 | 0 | 1 | 0 | 1 | 0 | 0 | X | 2 |
| Slovakia (Gallo) 🔨 | 0 | 1 | 0 | 1 | 0 | 3 | 1 | X | 6 |

| Sheet C | 1 | 2 | 3 | 4 | 5 | 6 | 7 | 8 | Final |
| Iceland (Hreinsson) | 0 | 0 | 0 | 0 | 1 | 0 | 0 | X | 1 |
| Romania (Coliban) 🔨 | 1 | 1 | 1 | 1 | 0 | 2 | 1 | X | 7 |

| Sheet D | 1 | 2 | 3 | 4 | 5 | 6 | 7 | 8 | Final |
| France (Coulot) | 0 | 1 | 0 | 1 | 2 | 0 | 3 | X | 7 |
| Slovenia (Tišler) 🔨 | 0 | 0 | 2 | 0 | 0 | 1 | 0 | X | 3 |

| Sheet E | 1 | 2 | 3 | 4 | 5 | 6 | 7 | 8 | Final |
| Serbia (Mijatović) | 0 | 0 | 2 | 1 | 0 | 1 | 0 | X | 4 |
| Bulgaria (Seiler) 🔨 | 2 | 2 | 0 | 0 | 3 | 0 | 1 | X | 8 |

==== Draw 10 ====
Thursday, October 15, 8:00

| Sheet A | 1 | 2 | 3 | 4 | 5 | 6 | 7 | 8 | Final |
| Belarus (Petrov) 🔨 | 1 | 0 | 1 | 0 | 2 | 0 | 3 | 0 | 7 |
| Ireland (Russell) | 0 | 2 | 0 | 3 | 0 | 1 | 0 | 2 | 8 |

| Sheet B | 1 | 2 | 3 | 4 | 5 | 6 | 7 | 8 | Final |
| Andorra (Garcia) | 0 | 0 | 1 | 0 | 0 | 0 | X | X | 1 |
| Romania (Coliban) 🔨 | 0 | 1 | 3 | 0 | 2 | 1 | 3 | X | 10 |

| Sheet C | 1 | 2 | 3 | 4 | 5 | 6 | 7 | 8 | Final |
| Serbia (Mijatović) 🔨 | 4 | 1 | 0 | 0 | 1 | 0 | 3 | X | 9 |
| France (Coulot) | 0 | 0 | 1 | 3 | 0 | 2 | 0 | X | 6 |

| Sheet D | 1 | 2 | 3 | 4 | 5 | 6 | 7 | 8 | Final |
| Luxembourg (Hansen) | 0 | 2 | 1 | 0 | 1 | 0 | X | X | 4 |
| Slovakia (Gallo) 🔨 | 5 | 0 | 0 | 2 | 0 | 2 | X | X | 9 |

| Sheet E | 1 | 2 | 3 | 4 | 5 | 6 | 7 | 8 | Final |
| Slovenia (Tišler) 🔨 | 1 | 2 | 1 | 2 | 2 | 0 | X | X | 8 |
| Iceland (Hreinsson) | 0 | 0 | 0 | 0 | 0 | 1 | X | X | 1 |

==== Draw 12 ====
Thursday, October 15, 16:00

| Sheet A | 1 | 2 | 3 | 4 | 5 | 6 | 7 | 8 | Final |
| Romania (Coliban) | 1 | 0 | 0 | 0 | 0 | 1 | 0 | X | 2 |
| Slovakia (Gallo) 🔨 | 0 | 1 | 1 | 2 | 1 | 0 | 2 | X | 7 |

| Sheet B | 1 | 2 | 3 | 4 | 5 | 6 | 7 | 8 | Final |
| Serbia (Mijatović) | 2 | 2 | 3 | 0 | 1 | 0 | X | X | 8 |
| Iceland (Hreinsson) 🔨 | 0 | 0 | 0 | 1 | 0 | 1 | X | X | 2 |

| Sheet C | 1 | 2 | 3 | 4 | 5 | 6 | 7 | 8 | Final |
| Ireland (Russell) | 2 | 2 | 0 | 0 | 0 | 0 | 2 | X | 6 |
| Luxembourg (Hansen) 🔨 | 0 | 0 | 1 | 0 | 1 | 0 | 0 | X | 2 |

| Sheet D | 1 | 2 | 3 | 4 | 5 | 6 | 7 | 8 | Final |
| Belarus (Petrov) | 2 | 2 | 0 | 2 | 0 | 1 | 2 | X | 9 |
| Bulgaria (Seiler) 🔨 | 0 | 0 | 1 | 0 | 1 | 0 | 0 | X | 2 |

| Sheet E | 1 | 2 | 3 | 4 | 5 | 6 | 7 | 8 | Final |
| France (Coulot) 🔨 | 0 | 4 | 1 | 6 | 1 | 2 | X | X | 14 |
| Andorra (Garcia) | 1 | 0 | 0 | 0 | 0 | 0 | X | X | 1 |

==== Draw 13 ====
Thursday, October 15, 20:00

| Sheet A | 1 | 2 | 3 | 4 | 5 | 6 | 7 | 8 | 9 | Final |
| Luxembourg (Hansen) 🔨 | 0 | 2 | 0 | 1 | 1 | 0 | 1 | 1 | 1 | 7 |
| Bulgaria (Seiler) | 1 | 0 | 3 | 0 | 0 | 2 | 0 | 0 | 0 | 6 |

| Sheet B | 1 | 2 | 3 | 4 | 5 | 6 | 7 | 8 | Final |
| Slovenia (Tišler) 🔨 | 2 | 1 | 2 | 1 | 0 | 2 | 1 | X | 8 |
| Ireland (Russell) | 0 | 0 | 0 | 1 | 0 | 0 | X | X | 1 |

| Sheet C | 1 | 2 | 3 | 4 | 5 | 6 | 7 | 8 | Final |
| Slovakia (Gallo) 🔨 | 0 | 4 | 0 | 1 | 0 | 4 | X | X | 9 |
| Iceland (Hreinsson) | 1 | 0 | 1 | 0 | 1 | 0 | X | X | 3 |

| Sheet D | 1 | 2 | 3 | 4 | 5 | 6 | 7 | 8 | Final |
| Romania (Coliban) | 1 | 0 | 0 | 0 | 0 | 0 | X | X | 1 |
| France (Coulot) 🔨 | 0 | 2 | 2 | 1 | 2 | 2 | X | X | 9 |

| Sheet E | 1 | 2 | 3 | 4 | 5 | 6 | 7 | 8 | Final |
| Belarus (Petrov) 🔨 | 0 | 1 | 0 | 2 | 0 | 0 | 2 | 1 | 6 |
| Serbia (Mijatović) | 1 | 0 | 3 | 0 | 1 | 2 | 0 | 0 | 7 |

==== Draw 15 ====
Friday, October 16, 12:00

| Sheet A | 1 | 2 | 3 | 4 | 5 | 6 | 7 | 8 | Final |
| Iceland (Hreinsson) | 0 | 2 | 0 | 1 | 0 | 1 | 2 | 0 | 6 |
| France (Coulot) 🔨 | 5 | 0 | 1 | 0 | 2 | 0 | 0 | 2 | 10 |

| Sheet B | 1 | 2 | 3 | 4 | 5 | 6 | 7 | 8 | Final |
| Luxembourg (Hansen) | 0 | 1 | 0 | 1 | 1 | 0 | 0 | X | 3 |
| Belarus (Petrov) 🔨 | 3 | 0 | 2 | 0 | 0 | 1 | 1 | X | 7 |

| Sheet C | 1 | 2 | 3 | 4 | 5 | 6 | 7 | 8 | Final |
| Slovenia (Tišler) 🔨 | 2 | 1 | 0 | 0 | 1 | 1 | 0 | X | 5 |
| Bulgaria (Seiler) | 0 | 0 | 2 | 0 | 0 | 0 | 1 | X | 3 |

| Sheet D | 1 | 2 | 3 | 4 | 5 | 6 | 7 | 8 | Final |
| Andorra (Garcia) 🔨 | 0 | 0 | 2 | 0 | 0 | 1 | 2 | X | 5 |
| Serbia (Mijatović) | 1 | 1 | 0 | 3 | 3 | 0 | 0 | X | 8 |

| Sheet E | 1 | 2 | 3 | 4 | 5 | 6 | 7 | 8 | Final |
| Slovakia (Gallo) 🔨 | 1 | 1 | 0 | 0 | 0 | 0 | 0 | 0 | 2 |
| Ireland (Furey) | 0 | 0 | 1 | 1 | 0 | 0 | 0 | 2 | 4 |

==== Draw 17 ====
Friday, October 16, 20:00

| Sheet A | 1 | 2 | 3 | 4 | 5 | 6 | 7 | 8 | Final |
| Slovenia (Tišler) 🔨 | 2 | 2 | 0 | 1 | 0 | 2 | 0 | 0 | 7 |
| Serbia (Mijatović) | 0 | 0 | 1 | 0 | 2 | 0 | 1 | 1 | 5 |

| Sheet B | 1 | 2 | 3 | 4 | 5 | 6 | 7 | 8 | Final |
| Bulgaria (Seiler) | 1 | 0 | 2 | 0 | 0 | 1 | 1 | 0 | 5 |
| France (Coulot) 🔨 | 0 | 2 | 0 | 1 | 0 | 0 | 0 | 1 | 4 |

| Sheet C | 1 | 2 | 3 | 4 | 5 | 6 | 7 | 8 | Final |
| Andorra (Garcia) 🔨 | 0 | 0 | 1 | 0 | 0 | 1 | 1 | X | 3 |
| Belarus (Petrov) | 1 | 3 | 0 | 1 | 1 | 0 | 0 | X | 6 |

| Sheet D | 1 | 2 | 3 | 4 | 5 | 6 | 7 | 8 | Final |
| Ireland (Furey) 🔨 | 0 | 3 | 0 | 3 | 2 | 0 | 2 | X | 10 |
| Iceland (Hreinsson) | 1 | 0 | 1 | 0 | 0 | 2 | 0 | X | 4 |

| Sheet E | 1 | 2 | 3 | 4 | 5 | 6 | 7 | 8 | Final |
| Luxembourg (Hansen) | 2 | 1 | 0 | 0 | 1 | 1 | 0 | 2 | 7 |
| Romania (Coliban) 🔨 | 0 | 0 | 4 | 1 | 0 | 0 | 1 | 0 | 6 |

=== Playoffs ===
Second Place Game
1 | Slovakia | 7
3 | France | 5

Semifinals
1 | Slovakia | 1
2 | Slovenia | 8
3 | France | 5
4 | Ireland | 3

==== 1 vs. 2 ====
Saturday, October 17, 10:00

| Sheet B | 1 | 2 | 3 | 4 | 5 | 6 | 7 | 8 | Final |
| Slovakia (Gallo) 🔨 | 0 | 0 | 0 | 0 | 1 | 0 | X | X | 1 |
| Slovenia (Tišler) | 1 | 2 | 1 | 1 | 0 | 3 | X | X | 8 |

Slovenia advance to Group B competitions.
Slovakia advance to Second Place Game.

==== 3 vs. 4 ====
Saturday, October 17, 10:00

| Sheet C | 1 | 2 | 3 | 4 | 5 | 6 | 7 | 8 | Final |
| France (Coulot) 🔨 | 0 | 1 | 0 | 0 | 1 | 2 | 0 | 1 | 5 |
| Ireland (Furey) | 1 | 0 | 1 | 1 | 0 | 0 | 0 | 0 | 3 |

France advance to Second Place Game.

==== Second Place Game ====
Saturday, October 17, 15:00

| Sheet D | 1 | 2 | 3 | 4 | 5 | 6 | 7 | 8 | Final |
| Slovakia (Gallo) 🔨 | 2 | 0 | 2 | 0 | 0 | 1 | 1 | 1 | 7 |
| France (Coulot) | 0 | 1 | 0 | 3 | 1 | 0 | 0 | 0 | 5 |

Slovakia advance to Group B competitions.
