= David Reid (curler) =

Scottish male curler and coach

- Curler ♂
- Other names: Dave
- Born: 21 April 1987 (age 39)

Team
- Curling club: Stewarton Heather CC

Curling career
- Member Association: Scotland; United Kingdom
- World Championship: 1 (2014)
- Other appearances: European Youth Olympic Winter Festival: 1 (2005)
Medal record
Curling
Scottish Men's Championship
Gold medal – first place	2014 Perth
Gold medal – first place	2015 Perth
European Youth Olympic Winter Festival
Gold medal – first place	2005 Monthey

David "Dave" Reid (born 21 April 1987) is a Scottish curler and curling coach.

At the national level, he is a two-time Scottish men's champion curler (2014, 2015).

== Teams ==
=== Men's ===
Season	Skip	Third	Second	Lead	Alternate	Coach	Events
2004–05	Andrew Craigie	Gordon McDougall	David Reid	Robert Craigie	Jamie Dick	Alan Hannah	EYOWF 2005 (gold)
2007–08	Alan Smith	Neil MacArthur	David Reid	Mark Fraser			
2007–08	Glen Muirhead	Scott MacLeod	Scott Andrews	Gordon McDougall	David Reid		WJCC 2008 (9th)
2008–09	Alan Smith	Mark Fraser	David Reid	Neil MacArthur			SMCC 2009 (9th)
2010–11	Scott Hamilton	Creig Reid	David Reid	Neil MacArthur			
2011–12	Ally Fraser	David Reid	Ruairidh Greenwood	Tom Pendreigh			
2012–13	Glen Muirhead	David Reid	Steven Mitchell	Kerr Drummond			SMCC 2013 (5th)
2013–14	Ewan MacDonald	Duncan Fernie	Dave Reid	Euan Byers	Glen Muirhead (WCC)	Tom Pendreigh	SMCC 2014 (gold); WCC 2014 (9th)
2014–15	Ewan MacDonald	Duncan Fernie	Ruairidh Greenwood	Euan Byers	David Reid		SMCC 2015 (gold)
2015–16	Grant Hardie	Blair Fraser	David Reid	Billy Morton	Jay McWilliam		SMCC 2016 (5th)
2016–17	Grant Hardie	Blair Fraser	David Reid	Duncan Menzies		Robin Halliday	SMCC 2017 (5th)

=== Mixed ===
Season	Skip	Third	Second	Lead	Events
2012–13	David Mundell	Sarah Reid	David Reid	Fiona Steele	SMxCC 2013 (silver)
2013–14	David Mundell	Sarah Reid	David Reid	Fiona Steele	SMxCC 2014 (bronze)

== Record as a coach of national teams ==
Year	Tournament, event	National team	Place
2015	2015 World Men's Curling Championship	Scotland (men)	11
