= David Edwards (curler) =

Scottish male curler

- Curler ♂
- Born: 13 September 1979 (age 47); Dumfries, Scotland

Curling career
- Member Association: Scotland
- World Championship: 1 (2012)
- European Championship: 2 (2011, 2014)
- Other appearances: European Mixed Championship: 2 (2010, 2011), World Junior Curling Championships: 1 (2001)
Medal record
Curling
World Championships
Silver medal – second place	2012 Basel
European Mixed Championship
Gold medal – first place	2010 Howwood
Scottish Men's Championship
Silver medal – second place	2014
Bronze medal – third place	2012
Bronze medal – third place	2013

David Edwards (born 13 September 1979 in Dumfries, Scotland) is a Scottish male curler.

He is a 2012 World Men's silver medallist and a 2010 European Mixed champion.

== Teams ==
=== Men's ===
Season	Skip	Third	Second	Lead	Alternate	Coach	Events
2000–01	David Edwards	Callum Allison	Kenneth Edwards	Graham Sloan	Paul Stevenson (WJCC)	Robert Kelly	SJCC 2001 (gold); WJCC 2001 (4th)
2004–05	David Edwards	Moray Combe	Richard Dickson	Sandy Reid			SMCC 2005 (9th)
2005–06	David Edwards	Paul Westwood	Ross Paterson	Sandy Gilmour			SMCC 2006 (9th)
2006–07	David Edwards	Paul Westwood	Ross Paterson	Sandy Gilmour			SMCC 2007 (5th)
2008–09	David Edwards	Moray Combe	Gavin Fleming	Graham Sloan			
2008–09	Tom Brewster	Duncan Fernie	Ronald Brewster	David Edwards			
2009–10	Tom Brewster	Duncan Fernie	Ronald Brewster	David Edwards			
2010–11	Duncan Fernie	David Edwards	Richard Woods	Colin Campbell			SMCC (5th)
2011–12	David Murdoch	Glen Muirhead	Ross Paterson	Richard Woods	David Edwards	David Ramsay	ECC 2011 (5th)
2011–12	David Edwards	John Penny	Scott Macleod	Colin Campbell			SMCC 2012 (bronze)
2011–12	Tom Brewster	Greg Drummond	Scott Andrews	Michael Goodfellow	David Edwards	Ronald Brewster	WCC 2012 (silver)
2012–13	David Edwards	John Penny	Scott Macleod	Colin Campbell			SMCC 2013 (bronze)
2013–14	David Edwards	John Penny	Scott Macleod	Colin Campbell		Greig Henderson	SMCC 2014 (silver)
2014–15	David Edwards	John Penny	Scott Macleod	Billy Morton	Tom Brewster (ECC)	Greig Henderson	ECC 2014 (7th); SMCC 2015 (4th)
2015–16	Ewan MacDonald	David Edwards	Ruairidh Greenwood	Euan Byers		Tom Pendreigh	SMCC 2016 (7th)
2016–17	Ewan MacDonald	David Edwards	Duncan Fernie	Euan Byers			

=== Mixed ===
Season	Skip	Third	Second	Lead	Events
2010	David Edwards	Claire Perras (SMxCC); Kerry Barr (EMxCC)	Dillon Perras	Louise Wood	SMxCC 2010 (gold); EMxCC 2010 (gold)
2011	David Edwards	Kerry Barr	Scott Macleod	Louise Wood	SMxCC 2011 (gold); EMxCC 2011 (7th)
2014	David Edwards	Susan Kesley	Colin Campbell	Fran Stretton	SMxCC 2014 (bronze)

== Private life ==
He attended the University of Aberdeen.
