= Kauste (surname) =

Kauste is a surname. Notable people with the surname include:

- Aku Kauste (born 1979), Finnish curler
- Oona Kauste (born 1988), Finnish curler
