= Eric W. Morse =

Canadian writer (1904–1986)

Eric W. Morse was a Canadian writer, wilderness canoe traveler and historian. He was born in India on December 29, 1904, and died in Ottawa in March 1986.

== Life ==
In 1951, while at an Ottawa dinner party, Eric Morse challenged the diplomats and businessmen to learn about the real Canada and get out on the land. The next year, he and a small group began taking treks in the wilderness of Canada. Several of his wilderness trips were with Sigurd Olson, the national director of Canadian Clubs from 1949 until 1971, as well as journalist Blair Fraser. In 1984, he was one of four persons that year (the others including Chuck Yeager and Sally Ride) conferred Honorary Memberships in the Explorer's Club. In 1977, Canadian Geographic magazine published an eight-page article by Morse titled Recreational canoeing in Canada; its history and its hazards. In that article he significantly noted that "wilderness, instead of being hated and feared had come to have a new escape value; and the canoe remained the best way to penetrate it."

In 1955, Morse, Sigurd Olson and four others took a 500 mile canoe trip on the Churchill River from Île-à-la-Crosse to Cumberland House. An account of this trip was enshrined in Sigurd Olson's book The Lonely Land. This group took several trips together before and after that journey and became known as The Voyageurs. In the 1960s, Eric and a younger group of paddlers traveled long stretches of Canada's far north including Eric's favorite river, the Coppermine (1966) and the Thelon (1962). In 1965, Eric's party traveled up the Rat River, N.W.T. and over the continental divide through McDougall Pass, the lowest point on the western cordillera, into Yukon Territory and down the Porcupine River. In 1985, the Morse River was named (Topo Map 66F) by a group of Canadian paddlers from the Hide-Away Canoe Club. The name change was passed on August 1, 1985, while the group was still on the trip. The Morse River drains into the south side of Garry Lake on the Back River system. Pierre Trudeau supported the naming application.

== Books ==
Books written by Morse include:

- Fur trade canoe routes of Canada / Then and now First published in 1969
- Fur trade canoe routes of Canada First published in 1971
- Canoe routes of the voyageurs First published in 1962
- Freshwater Saga Memoirs of a Lifetime of Wilderness Canoeing First published in 1987
- The exploration of Canada First published in 1971
