= Kasper Hakunti =

Finnish curler

- Curler
- Born: 17 November 1988 (age 37); Helsinki

Team
- Curling club: Kisakallio CC, Lohja
- Skip: Aku Kauste
- Third: Kasper Hakunti
- Second: Pauli Jäämies
- Lead: Janne Pitko

Curling career
- World Championship: 2 (2015, 2016)
- European Championship: 4 (2011, 2014, 2015, 2016)

Kasper Hakunti (born November 17, 1988) is a Finnish curler. Hakunti competed at the 2015 Ford World Men's Curling Championship in Halifax, Nova Scotia, Canada, as vice-skip for the Finnish national curling team. Hakunti previously curled with Markku Uusipaavalniemi from 2009 to 2011, and was the fourth for the Finnish team at the 2010 World Junior Curling Championships in Flims, Switzerland leading them to a 7th-place finish.

== Personal life ==
Hakunti is single, and currently works as a TV and radio campaign manager.
