= Janne Pitko =

Finnish curler from Espoo (born 1981)

- Curler
- Born: 8 September 1981 (age 45); Kemi

Team
- Curling club: Kisakallio CC, Lohja
- Skip: Aku Kauste
- Third: Kasper Hakunti
- Second: Pauli Jäämies
- Lead: Janne Pitko
- Alternate: Kalle Kiiskinen

Curling career
- World Championship: 3 (2013, 2015, 2016)
- European Championship: 4 (2012, 2014, 2015, 2016)

Janne Pitko (born September 8, 1981) is a Finnish curler from Espoo. He competed at the 2015 Ford World Men's Curling Championship in Halifax, Nova Scotia, Canada, as lead for the Finnish national curling team. He is a professional poker player outside of curling, and helps support the Finland national football team.
