= 2015 World Men's Curling Championship =

- Host city: Halifax, Nova Scotia, Canada
- Arena: Scotiabank Centre
- Dates: March 28 – April 5, 2015
- Attendance: 56,837
- Winner: Sweden
- Curling club: Karlstads CK, Karlstad
- Skip: Niklas Edin
- Third: Oskar Eriksson
- Second: Kristian Lindström
- Lead: Christoffer Sundgren
- Finalist: Norway (Thomas Ulsrud)

The 2015 World Men's Curling Championship (branded as Ford World Men's Curling Championship 2015 for sponsorship reasons) was held from March 28 to April 5 at the Scotiabank Centre in Halifax, Nova Scotia, Canada. It marked the first time that a World Curling Championship had been held in Halifax, and the first time that a World Curling Championship event had been held in the province since the World Junior Curling Championships were held in Dartmouth in 1986.

== Qualification ==
The following nations qualified to participate in the 2015 Ford World Men's Curling Championship:

- Canada (host country)
- One team from the 2015 USA–Brazil Challenge
  - United States
- Eight teams from the 2014 European Curling Championships
  - Sweden
  - Italy
  - Switzerland
  - Norway
  - Russia
  - Czech Republic
  - Scotland
  - Finland (winner of the World Challenge Games)
- Two teams from the 2014 Pacific-Asia Curling Championships
  - Japan
  - China

== Teams ==
Canada	China	Czech Republic
Glencoe CC, Calgary Skip: Pat Simmons; Third: John Morris; Second: Carter Rycroft; Lead: Nolan Thiessen; Alternate: Tom Sallows	Harbin CC, Harbin Skip: Zang Jialiang; Third: Zou Dejia; Second: Ba Dexin; Lead: Wang Jinbo; Alternate: Zhang Rongrui	CK Brno, Brno Skip: Jiří Snítil; Third: Lukáš Klíma; Second: Martin Snítil; Lead: Jindřich Kitzberger; Alternate: Samuel Mokriš
Finland	Italy	Japan
Kisakallio CC, Lohja Skip: Aku Kauste; Third: Kasper Hakunti; Second: Pauli Jäämies; Lead: Janne Pitko; Alternate: Leo Mäkelä	A.S.D. Trentino Curling, Cembra Fourth: Amos Mosaner; Skip: Joël Retornaz; Second: Daniele Ferrazza; Lead: Andrea Pilzer; Alternate: Sebastiano Arman	Karuizawa CC, Karuizawa Skip: Yusuke Morozumi; Third: Tsuyoshi Yamaguchi; Second: Tetsuro Shimizu; Lead: Kosuke Morozumi; Alternate: Yuta Matsumura
Norway	Russia	Scotland
Snarøen CC, Bærum Skip: Thomas Ulsrud; Third: Torger Nergård; Second: Christoffer Svae; Lead: Håvard Vad Petersson; Alternate: Markus Snøve Høiberg	Moskvitch CC, Moscow Skip: Evgeny Arkhipov; Third: Alexander Kozyrev; Second: Artur Razhabov; Lead: Anton Kalalb; Alternate: Alexey Stukalskiy	Citadel CC, Inverness Skip: Ewan MacDonald; Third: Duncan Fernie; Second: Ruairidh Greenwood; Lead: Euan Byers; Alternate: David Murdoch
Sweden	Switzerland	United States
Karlstads CK, Karlstad Skip: Niklas Edin; Third: Oskar Eriksson; Second: Kristian Lindström; Lead: Christoffer Sundgren; Alternate: Henrik Leek	CC Bern, Bern Skip: Marc Pfister; Third: Enrico Pfister; Second: Reto Keller; Lead: Raphael Märki; Alternate: Sven Michel	Duluth CC, Duluth Skip: John Shuster; Third: Tyler George; Second: Matt Hamilton; Lead: John Landsteiner; Alternate: Craig Brown

=== WCT ranking ===
World Curling Tour Order of Merit ranking of national teams (year to date total)

Country (Skip)	Rank	Points
Sweden (Edin)	7	124.500
Canada (Simmons/Morris)	14	78.000
Norway (Ulsrud)	16	68.355
United States (Shuster)	21	51.411
Japan (Morozumi)	22	51.348
Switzerland (Pfister)	29	40.310
China (Zang)	30	38.049
Czech Republic (Snítil)	37	28.575
Italy (Retornaz/Mosaner)	52	20.000
Finland (Kauste)	58	18.025
Russia (Arkhipov)	61	17.500
Scotland (MacDonald)	98	9.440

== Round-robin standings ==
Final round-robin standings

Key
Teams to Playoffs
Teams to Tiebreaker

Country	Skip	W	L	PF	PA	Ends Won	Ends Lost	Blank Ends	Stolen Ends	Shot Pct.
Norway	Thomas Ulsrud	10	1	94	63	52	43	7	12	81%
Canada	Pat Simmons	10	1	85	54	49	35	14	16	85%
Sweden	Niklas Edin	8	3	84	59	45	39	10	9	84%
Finland	Aku Kauste	6	5	76	69	52	45	14	16	78%
United States	John Shuster	6	5	74	71	43	46	13	7	79%
Japan	Yusuke Morozumi	5	6	72	66	45	42	9	11	79%
Switzerland	Marc Pfister	5	6	60	61	38	41	20	6	79%
China	Zang Jialiang	4	7	70	71	50	42	12	15	80%
Czech Republic	Jiří Snítil	4	7	61	84	42	49	13	7	78%
Italy	Joël Retornaz	3	8	49	73	32	44	18	7	75%
Scotland	Ewan MacDonald	3	8	56	86	41	51	12	10	79%
Russia	Evgeny Arkhipov	2	9	52	76	37	49	20	8	77%

== Round-robin results ==
All draw times are listed in Atlantic Daylight Time (UTC−3).

=== Draw 1 ===
Saturday, March 28, 14:30

Sheet A	1	2	3	4	5	6	7	8	9	10	Final
Russia (Arkhipov)	0	0	1	0	1	0	0	0	2	0	4
Japan (Morozumi)	2	2	0	1	0	0	1	0	0	1	7

Sheet B	1	2	3	4	5	6	7	8	9	10	11	Final
Czech Republic (Snítil)	0	0	1	0	2	0	0	1	0	1	0	5
Switzerland (Pfister)	0	0	0	2	0	0	2	0	1	0	1	6

Sheet C	1	2	3	4	5	6	7	8	9	10	11	Final
Scotland (MacDonald)	1	1	0	0	0	2	0	0	1	0	0	5
Italy (Retornaz)	0	0	1	1	1	0	0	1	0	1	1	6

Sheet D	1	2	3	4	5	6	7	8	9	10	Final
Sweden (Edin)	0	0	1	0	0	2	0	1	0	2	6
Finland (Kauste)	0	0	0	2	1	0	1	0	1	0	5

=== Draw 2 ===
Saturday, March 28, 19:30

Sheet A	1	2	3	4	5	6	7	8	9	10	Final
Norway (Ulsrud)	0	0	3	0	3	0	0	2	0	1	9
China (Zang)	1	1	0	1	0	0	2	0	2	0	7

Sheet B	1	2	3	4	5	6	7	8	9	10	Final
Japan (Morozumi)	0	1	1	0	2	0	0	5	X	X	9
Scotland (MacDonald)	0	0	0	1	0	0	2	0	X	X	3

Sheet C	1	2	3	4	5	6	7	8	9	10	Final
Finland (Kauste)	2	0	0	1	0	1	0	2	1	0	7
Czech Republic (Snítil)	0	2	1	0	2	0	2	0	0	1	8

Sheet D	1	2	3	4	5	6	7	8	9	10	11	Final
United States (Shuster)	0	3	0	4	0	0	1	1	0	1	0	10
Canada (Simmons)	1	0	3	0	2	1	0	0	3	0	1	11

=== Draw 3 ===
Sunday, March 29, 9:30

Sheet B	1	2	3	4	5	6	7	8	9	10	Final
Italy (Retornaz)	0	0	3	0	0	0	2	0	6	X	11
Sweden (Edin)	0	1	0	0	1	1	0	2	0	X	5

Sheet C	1	2	3	4	5	6	7	8	9	10	Final
Russia (Arkhipov)	0	1	0	0	0	1	0	3	0	X	5
Switzerland (Pfister)	0	0	0	0	0	0	1	0	2	X	3

=== Draw 4 ===
Sunday, March 29, 14:30

Sheet A	1	2	3	4	5	6	7	8	9	10	11	Final
Finland (Kauste)	1	1	0	3	1	0	1	0	0	0	3	10
Scotland (MacDonald)	0	0	2	0	0	2	0	0	2	1	0	7

Sheet B	1	2	3	4	5	6	7	8	9	10	Final
Canada (Simmons)	0	0	2	1	2	0	0	2	0	X	7
China (Zang)	0	2	0	0	0	1	0	0	1	X	4

Sheet C	1	2	3	4	5	6	7	8	9	10	11	Final
Norway (Ulsrud)	0	0	0	2	0	1	0	0	3	1	0	7
United States (Shuster)	0	2	1	0	1	0	2	1	0	0	3	10

Sheet D	1	2	3	4	5	6	7	8	9	10	Final
Czech Republic (Snítil)	0	2	0	1	1	0	0	3	1	0	8
Japan (Morozumi)	1	0	1	0	0	2	1	0	0	1	6

=== Draw 5 ===
Sunday, March 29, 19:30

Sheet A	1	2	3	4	5	6	7	8	9	10	Final
Switzerland (Pfister)	2	1	0	2	0	1	0	3	X	X	9
United States (Shuster)	0	0	1	0	1	0	1	0	X	X	3

Sheet B	1	2	3	4	5	6	7	8	9	10	11	Final
Norway (Ulsrud)	0	1	1	0	2	0	0	1	1	0	1	7
Russia (Arkhipov)	1	0	0	1	0	2	0	0	0	2	0	6

Sheet C	1	2	3	4	5	6	7	8	9	10	Final
Canada (Simmons)	3	0	1	0	1	0	1	0	1	2	9
Sweden (Edin)	0	1	0	1	0	2	0	2	0	0	6

Sheet D	1	2	3	4	5	6	7	8	9	10	Final
Italy (Retornaz)	0	0	0	1	0	0	1	0	0	X	2
China (Zang)	1	1	0	0	1	1	0	1	1	X	6

=== Draw 6 ===
Monday, March 30, 9:30

Sheet A	1	2	3	4	5	6	7	8	9	10	Final
Czech Republic (Snítil)	1	0	0	0	1	0	X	X	X	X	2
Canada (Simmons)	0	4	3	3	0	1	X	X	X	X	11

Sheet B	1	2	3	4	5	6	7	8	9	10	Final
United States (Shuster)	0	0	0	1	0	0	1	0	2	0	4
Finland (Kauste)	0	1	0	0	2	1	0	2	0	1	7

Sheet C	1	2	3	4	5	6	7	8	9	10	Final
China (Zang)	1	0	2	0	1	0	0	1	0	X	5
Japan (Morozumi)	0	3	0	3	0	1	0	0	2	X	9

Sheet D	1	2	3	4	5	6	7	8	9	10	Final
Norway (Ulsrud)	0	6	0	1	0	2	0	2	X	X	11
Scotland (MacDonald)	1	0	1	0	2	0	2	0	X	X	6

=== Draw 7 ===
Monday, March 30, 14:30

Sheet A	1	2	3	4	5	6	7	8	9	10	Final
Japan (Morozumi)	0	1	0	1	0	0	0	1	1	0	4
Finland (Kauste)	0	0	2	0	1	0	1	0	0	1	5

Sheet B	1	2	3	4	5	6	7	8	9	10	Final
Switzerland (Pfister)	0	4	0	0	0	1	0	2	X	X	7
Italy (Retornaz)	0	0	0	0	1	0	0	0	X	X	1

Sheet C	1	2	3	4	5	6	7	8	9	10	Final
Czech Republic (Snítil)	0	1	0	2	0	0	2	2	0	1	8
Scotland (MacDonald)	2	0	2	0	1	0	0	0	1	0	6

Sheet D	1	2	3	4	5	6	7	8	9	10	Final
Russia (Arkhipov)	0	0	2	0	1	0	0	X	X	X	3
Sweden (Edin)	3	0	0	2	0	0	4	X	X	X	9

=== Draw 8 ===
Monday, March 30, 19:30

Sheet A	1	2	3	4	5	6	7	8	9	10	Final
United States (Shuster)	6	0	0	1	1	0	X	X	X	X	8
Italy (Retornaz)	0	0	2	0	0	0	X	X	X	X	2

Sheet B	1	2	3	4	5	6	7	8	9	10	Final
Russia (Arkhipov)	0	0	1	0	0	1	0	1	0	X	3
Canada (Simmons)	0	0	0	3	1	0	2	0	3	X	9

Sheet C	1	2	3	4	5	6	7	8	9	10	Final
Sweden (Edin)	0	1	0	1	0	1	0	2	0	0	5
Norway (Ulsrud)	1	0	1	0	1	0	1	0	1	1	6

Sheet D	1	2	3	4	5	6	7	8	9	10	Final
China (Zang)	0	0	2	0	0	1	0	1	0	0	4
Switzerland (Pfister)	1	0	0	2	0	0	0	0	2	2	7

=== Draw 9 ===
Tuesday, March 31, 9:30

Sheet A	1	2	3	4	5	6	7	8	9	10	Final
Scotland (MacDonald)	0	2	2	1	0	0	1	0	1	1	8
Russia (Arkhipov)	3	0	0	0	1	1	0	1	0	0	6

Sheet B	1	2	3	4	5	6	7	8	9	10	Final
Czech Republic (Snítil)	0	0	0	1	0	0	0	2	0	X	3
Sweden (Edin)	0	2	1	0	0	2	1	0	1	X	7

Sheet C	1	2	3	4	5	6	7	8	9	10	Final
Switzerland (Pfister)	3	0	3	0	1	0	0	0	0	1	8
Finland (Kauste)	0	2	0	2	0	1	0	1	1	0	7

Sheet D	1	2	3	4	5	6	7	8	9	10	Final
Japan (Morozumi)	1	1	3	1	2	0	X	X	X	X	8
Italy (Retornaz)	0	0	0	0	0	1	X	X	X	X	1

=== Draw 10 ===
Tuesday, March 31, 14:30

Sheet A	1	2	3	4	5	6	7	8	9	10	Final
China (Zang)	1	0	0	1	0	5	0	1	0	0	8
Czech Republic (Snítil)	0	0	1	0	1	0	2	0	2	1	7

Sheet B	1	2	3	4	5	6	7	8	9	10	Final
Finland (Kauste)	1	0	0	1	0	2	0	0	2	1	7
Norway (Ulsrud)	0	1	2	0	2	0	2	1	0	0	8

Sheet C	1	2	3	4	5	6	7	8	9	10	Final
Japan (Morozumi)	1	0	1	0	2	0	0	0	0	X	4
Canada (Simmons)	0	1	0	3	0	0	2	1	0	X	7

Sheet D	1	2	3	4	5	6	7	8	9	10	Final
Scotland (MacDonald)	1	0	0	2	0	0	0	1	1	1	6
United States (Shuster)	0	0	2	0	2	0	0	0	0	0	4

=== Draw 11 ===
Tuesday, March 31, 19:30

Sheet A	1	2	3	4	5	6	7	8	9	10	Final
Switzerland (Pfister)	0	1	0	0	0	1	X	X	X	X	2
Sweden (Edin)	1	0	2	2	3	0	X	X	X	X	8

Sheet B	1	2	3	4	5	6	7	8	9	10	Final
China (Zang)	1	0	1	0	1	1	0	1	0	X	5
United States (Shuster)	0	2	0	3	0	0	1	0	3	X	9

Sheet C	1	2	3	4	5	6	7	8	9	10	Final
Italy (Retornaz)	0	0	0	2	0	1	0	1	0	0	4
Russia (Arkhipov)	0	0	1	0	1	0	2	0	0	1	5

Sheet D	1	2	3	4	5	6	7	8	9	10	Final
Canada (Simmons)	0	1	0	1	0	0	1	0	X	X	3
Norway (Ulsrud)	2	0	4	0	0	1	0	2	X	X	9

=== Draw 12 ===
Wednesday, April 1, 9:30

Sheet A	1	2	3	4	5	6	7	8	9	10	Final
Italy (Retornaz)	0	1	0	0	1	0	X	X	X	X	2
Norway (Ulsrud)	2	0	2	2	0	3	X	X	X	X	9

Sheet B	1	2	3	4	5	6	7	8	9	10	Final
Canada (Simmons)	1	1	0	3	2	0	1	0	X	X	8
Switzerland (Pfister)	0	0	1	0	0	1	0	2	X	X	4

Sheet C	1	2	3	4	5	6	7	8	9	10	Final
United States (Shuster)	0	0	3	0	2	0	1	0	X	X	6
Sweden (Edin)	0	1	0	2	0	3	0	5	X	X	11

Sheet D	1	2	3	4	5	6	7	8	9	10	Final
China (Zang)	0	0	1	2	0	1	2	0	2	X	8
Russia (Arkhipov)	0	0	0	0	1	0	0	2	0	X	3

=== Draw 13 ===
Wednesday, April 1, 14:30

Sheet A	1	2	3	4	5	6	7	8	9	10	Final
Russia (Arkhipov)	0	0	1	0	1	0	0	3	1	0	6
Finland (Kauste)	0	1	0	2	0	2	1	0	0	2	8

Sheet B	1	2	3	4	5	6	7	8	9	10	Final
Sweden (Edin)	2	0	3	0	1	3	X	X	X	X	9
Japan (Morozumi)	0	1	0	1	0	0	X	X	X	X	2

Sheet C	1	2	3	4	5	6	7	8	9	10	11	Final
Scotland (MacDonald)	0	1	0	2	0	0	0	0	0	1	1	5
Switzerland (Pfister)	0	0	1	0	0	1	1	1	0	0	0	4

Sheet D	1	2	3	4	5	6	7	8	9	10	Final
Italy (Retornaz)	0	1	0	2	0	1	2	1	0	2	9
Czech Republic (Snítil)	1	0	2	0	2	0	0	0	1	0	6

=== Draw 14 ===
Wednesday, April 1, 19:30

Sheet A	1	2	3	4	5	6	7	8	9	10	Final
Canada (Simmons)	1	1	1	0	1	1	0	2	X	X	7
Scotland (MacDonald)	0	0	0	1	0	0	0	0	X	X	1

Sheet B	1	2	3	4	5	6	7	8	9	10	Final
Norway (Ulsrud)	0	0	2	0	3	0	2	2	3	X	12
Czech Republic (Snítil)	0	2	0	1	0	2	0	0	0	X	5

Sheet C	1	2	3	4	5	6	7	8	9	10	11	Final
Finland (Kauste)	0	2	0	1	1	0	2	0	1	0	1	8
China (Zang)	1	0	2	0	0	2	0	1	0	1	0	7

Sheet D	1	2	3	4	5	6	7	8	9	10	Final
United States (Shuster)	0	2	2	0	1	0	1	0	2	X	8
Japan (Morozumi)	2	0	0	1	0	1	0	2	0	X	6

=== Draw 15 ===
Thursday, April 2, 9:30

Sheet A	1	2	3	4	5	6	7	8	9	10	Final
Czech Republic (Snítil)	0	0	0	1	0	0	0	1	0	X	2
United States (Shuster)	0	2	1	0	0	2	0	0	1	X	6

Sheet B	1	2	3	4	5	6	7	8	9	10	Final
Scotland (MacDonald)	0	1	0	0	1	0	1	0	X	X	3
China (Zang)	1	0	1	1	0	4	0	3	X	X	10

Sheet C	1	2	3	4	5	6	7	8	9	10	Final
Norway (Ulsrud)	2	0	3	2	0	1	0	1	0	1	10
Japan (Morozumi)	0	2	0	0	2	0	1	0	3	0	8

Sheet D	1	2	3	4	5	6	7	8	9	10	Final
Finland (Kauste)	0	1	0	1	0	1	0	0	2	0	5
Canada (Simmons)	0	0	0	0	2	0	0	2	0	2	6

=== Draw 16 ===
Thursday, April 2, 14:30

Sheet A	1	2	3	4	5	6	7	8	9	10	Final
Sweden (Edin)	1	1	0	0	2	0	3	0	0	0	7
China (Zang)	0	0	1	1	0	1	0	2	1	0	6

Sheet B	1	2	3	4	5	6	7	8	9	10	11	Final
United States (Shuster)	1	1	0	1	0	2	0	0	0	0	1	6
Russia (Arkhipov)	0	0	1	0	1	0	1	1	0	1	0	5

Sheet C	1	2	3	4	5	6	7	8	9	10	Final
Canada (Simmons)	2	0	2	0	0	2	0	0	0	1	7
Italy (Retornaz)	0	2	0	0	2	0	0	0	2	0	6

Sheet D	1	2	3	4	5	6	7	8	9	10	Final
Switzerland (Pfister)	0	0	0	1	0	1	0	2	0	X	4
Norway (Ulsrud)	1	2	0	0	2	0	1	0	0	X	6

=== Draw 17 ===
Thursday, April 2, 19:30

Sheet A	1	2	3	4	5	6	7	8	9	10	Final
Japan (Morozumi)	1	0	2	0	1	0	2	0	3	X	9
Switzerland (Pfister)	0	1	0	1	0	2	0	2	0	X	6

Sheet B	1	2	3	4	5	6	7	8	9	10	Final
Italy (Retornaz)	1	0	1	1	0	0	2	0	0	X	5
Finland (Kauste)	0	3	0	0	0	0	0	3	1	X	7

Sheet C	1	2	3	4	5	6	7	8	9	10	Final
Russia (Arkhipov)	0	0	2	1	0	0	0	3	0	0	6
Czech Republic (Snítil)	1	0	0	0	0	3	1	0	1	1	7

Sheet D	1	2	3	4	5	6	7	8	9	10	Final
Sweden (Edin)	4	1	0	0	1	0	2	0	3	X	11
Scotland (MacDonald)	0	0	2	1	0	2	0	1	0	X	6

== Tiebreaker ==
Friday, April 3, 14:30

Sheet C	1	2	3	4	5	6	7	8	9	10	Final
Finland (Kauste)	1	0	0	1	1	0	1	1	0	1	6
United States (Shuster)	0	0	2	0	0	2	0	0	1	0	5

Player percentages
Finland		United States	
Janne Pitko	78%	John Landsteiner	88%
Pauli Jäämies	65%	Matt Hamilton	90%
Kasper Hakunti	73%	Tyler George	94%
Aku Kauste	64%	John Shuster	78%
Total	75%	Total	87%

== Playoffs ==
Page playoff system
1	Norway	7
2	Canada	6
3	Sweden	7
4	Finland	4

Semifinal
2	Canada	3
3	Sweden	6

Final
1	Norway	5
3	Sweden	9

Bronze medal game
2	Canada	8
4	Finland	4

=== 1 vs. 2 ===
Friday, April 3, 19:30

Sheet B	1	2	3	4	5	6	7	8	9	10	11	Final
Norway (Ulsrud)	1	0	1	0	0	0	2	0	2	0	1	7
Canada (Simmons)	0	2	0	0	1	1	0	1	0	1	0	6

Player percentages
Norway		Canada	
Håvard Vad Petersson	82%	Nolan Thiessen	91%
Christoffer Svae	82%	Carter Rycroft	82%
Torger Nergård	70%	John Morris	85%
Thomas Ulsrud	91%	Pat Simmons	80%
Total	81%	Total	85%

=== 3 vs. 4 ===
Saturday, April 4, 14:30

Team	1	2	3	4	5	6	7	8	9	10	Final
Sweden (Edin)	1	0	0	0	1	2	0	2	0	1	7
Finland (Kauste)	0	0	0	1	0	0	2	0	1	0	4

Player percentages
Sweden		Finland	
Christoffer Sundgren	83%	Janne Pitko	91%
Kristian Lindström	81%	Pauli Jäämies	79%
Oskar Eriksson	88%	Kasper Hakunti	80%
Niklas Edin	88%	Aku Kauste	71%
Total	85%	Total	80%

=== Semifinal ===
Saturday, April 4, 19:30

Team	1	2	3	4	5	6	7	8	9	10	Final
Canada (Simmons)	0	1	0	1	0	0	0	1	0	X	3
Sweden (Edin)	1	0	2	0	2	1	0	0	0	X	6

Player percentages
Canada		Sweden	
Nolan Thiessen	74%	Christoffer Sundgren	82%
Carter Rycroft	83%	Kristian Lindström	89%
John Morris	78%	Oskar Eriksson	98%
Pat Simmons	72%	Niklas Edin	100%
Total	77%	Total	92%

=== Bronze medal game ===
Sunday, April 5, 10:00

Team	1	2	3	4	5	6	7	8	9	10	Final
Canada (Simmons)	1	1	0	3	0	2	0	0	1	X	8
Finland (Kauste)	0	0	1	0	1	0	0	2	0	X	4

Player percentages
Canada		Finland	
Nolan Thiessen	68%	Janne Pitko	94%
Carter Rycroft	88%	Pauli Jäämies	82%
John Morris	89%	Kasper Hakunti	74%
Pat Simmons	82%	Aku Kauste	78%
Total	82%	Total	82%

=== Final ===
Sunday, April 5, 16:00

Team	1	2	3	4	5	6	7	8	9	10	Final
Norway (Ulsrud)	0	1	2	0	0	1	0	1	X	X	5
Sweden (Edin)	3	0	0	0	3	0	3	0	X	X	9

Player percentages
Norway		Sweden	
Håvard Vad Petersson	82%	Christoffer Sundgren	77%
Christoffer Svae	70%	Kristian Lindström	81%
Torger Nergård	65%	Oskar Eriksson	90%
Thomas Ulsrud	70%	Niklas Edin	84%
Total	72%	Total	83%

2015 World Men's Curling Championship winner
(Sweden)
Sweden
7th title

== Statistics ==
=== Top 5 player percentages ===
Round robin only

Leads	%
(Sweden) Christoffer Sundgren	90
(Scotland) Euan Byers	86
(Canada) Nolan Thiessen	85
(Russia) Anton Kalalb	84
(China) Wang Jinbo	83

Seconds	%
(Norway) Christoffer Svae	86
(Canada) Carter Rycroft	85
(Sweden) Kristian Lindström	84
(Japan) Tetsuro Shimizu	83
(China) Ba Dexin	80

Thirds	%
(Canada) John Morris	84
(Sweden) Oskar Eriksson	84
(United States) Tyler George	82
(Norway) Torger Nergård	81
(Switzerland) Enrico Pfister	80

Skips	%
(Canada) Pat Simmons	84
(Sweden) Niklas Edin	83
(Norway) Thomas Ulsrud	83
(China) Zang Jialiang	82
(United States) John Shuster	80

=== Perfect games ===
Player	Team	Position	Opponent
Tyler George	United States	Third	Italy
Niklas Edin	Sweden	Skip	Canada (semifinal)
