= Ruairidh Greenwood =

Scottish curler

- Curler
- Born: 26 March 1992 (age 34); Scotland

Team
- Curling club: Ardclach Curling Club
- Skip: Ewan MacDonald
- Third: Duncan Fernie
- Lead: Euan Byers

Curling career
- Member Association: Scotland
- World Championship: 1 (2015)
Medal record
Scottish Men's Championship
Gold medal – first place	2015

Ruairidh Greenwood (born 26 March 1992) is a Scottish curler. He competed at the 2015 Ford World Men's Curling Championship in Halifax, Nova Scotia, Canada, as second for the Scottish team. He is a left-handed delivery.

He is a 2015 Scottish men's champion curler.
