= Blair Fraser =

Canadian journalist (1909–1968)

Blair Fraser was a Canadian reporter and editor, writing first in Montreal daily newspapers before writing for MacLean's Magazine for two decades. He died in 1968 in a canoeing accident in Algonquin Provincial Park.

Fraser was born in Sydney, Nova Scotia and attended Acadia University. He worked for English-language newspapers in Montreal from 1929 to 1943 before spending two decades writing for Maclean's, one of Canada's most prominent news magazines.

His colleague Douglas Marshall described him as "a gentleman journalist" who would interview people from all walks of life with the same level of interest.

Fraser knew his country well, having spent his youth in Atlantic Canada before moving to Quebec and Ontario, in addition to numerous trips as a journalist. He had a strong interest in the wilder parts of the country as an expression of the Canadian spirit. After his first canoe trip in 1951, he returned to the Canadian river routes as often as he could with a group formed by Eric Morse calling themselves the Voyageurs, which also included Sigurd Olson. Others would join the core group of travelers on an adventure, such as Pierre Elliott Trudeau. He also traveled abroad extensively, notably reporting from Vietnam, Germany, South Africa and China.

One of his sons, Graham Fraser, also became a journalist of note and served as Commissioner of Official Languages.

== Death and memorial ==
Fraser died on May 12, 1968, during a canoe trip on the Petawawa River as part of a group of experienced canoeists. Maneuvering a canoe in tandem with retired Canadian Forces officer Elliot Rodger in an unfamiliar section of the river, the men capsized when they hit a difficult stretch of rapids (Rollway Rapids). Elliott made it to safety, but Fraser's body was recovered later during a search and rescue effort. A coroner's examination concluded he died by drowning, possibly after his head hit a rock.

Fraser's Voyageur travel companions secured authorization from Algonquin Park to erect a small bronze cross on the shore, marking the site of the fatal accident. The cross was removed in 2008 by a canoeist offended by its presence and recovered by members of the Ontario Wilderness Adventurers club. In 2013, Blair's son Graham, grandsons Malcolm and Nick, and great-grandson Owen, with guides Phil Chester and Dan Caldwell, as well as journalist Roy McGregor, canoed to the site to repair the base and replace the cross.

== Books ==
Fraser expounded on his vision of Canada in his 1967 book The Search for Identity.

A selection of Fraser's Globe and Mail columns was published in 1968, under the title Blair Fraser Reports. The texts, originally published between 1944 and 1968, were selected by his sons John and Graham.
