= Aku Kauste =

Finnish curler (born 1979)

- Curler
- Born: 17 November 1979 (age 46); Espoo, Finland

Team
- Curling club: Kisakallio CC, Lohja, FIN
- Skip: Aku Kauste
- Third: Kasper Hakunti
- Second: Pauli Jäämies
- Lead: Janne Pitko
- Alternate: Leo Mäkelä
- Mixed doubles partner: Oona Kauste

Curling career
- Member Association: Finland
- World Championship: 5 (2002, 2003, 2013, 2015, 2016)
- World Mixed Doubles Championship: 1 (2021)
- European Championship: 8 (2002, 2004, 2009, 2012, 2014, 2015, 2016, 2017)
Medal record
European Mixed Championship
Bronze medal – third place	2012 Erzurum

Aku Kauste (born 17 November 1979) is a Finnish curler from Helsinki. He is currently the skip for the national team of Finland. Kauste is one of the most successful curling players in Finland, with over 20 medals in the Finnish Curling Championships (juniors, men's, mixed, mixed doubles).

== Career ==
Kauste started curling in 1994 with his father Timo Kauste. In 1998, Kauste made his first international appearance at the World Junior Curling Championships.

Kauste played in the 2002 and 2003 World Curling Championships with Team Finland, skipped by Markku Uusipaavalniemi. He has played in the European Curling Championships four times; in a team skipped by Uusipaavalniemi in 2002, and 2004 in a team skipped by Tomi Rantamäki in 2009, and as skip in 2012 where he won the Group B competitions, promoting Finland to the Group A competitions in 2013.

Kauste skipped Team Finland at the 2012 European Mixed Curling Championship where Finland won bronze. The other players of the medal team were Aku's sister Oona Kauste, Pauli Jäämies and Sanna Puustinen.
