= Euan Byers =

Scottish curler (born 1974)

- Curler
- Born: 30 July 1974 (age 52); Dumfries, Scotland

Team
- Skip: Ewan MacDonald
- Third: Duncan Fernie
- Second: David Reid
- Lead: Euan Byers

Curling career
- World Championship: 4 (2005, 2006, 2008, 2009)
- European Championship: 7 (2003, 2004, 2005, 2006, 2007, 2008, 2009)
- Olympic: 2 (2006, 2010)
Medal record
Men's Curling
Representing Scotland
World Championships
Gold medal – first place	2006 Lowell
Gold medal – first place	2009 Moncton
Silver medal – second place	2005 Victoria
Silver medal – second place	2008 Grand Forks
World Junior Championships
Gold medal – first place	1996 Red Deer
European Championships
Gold medal – first place	2003 Courmayeur
Gold medal – first place	2007 Füssen
Gold medal – first place	2008 Örnsköldsvik
Silver medal – second place	2006 Basel
Bronze medal – third place	2005 Garmisch-Partenkirchen
European Mixed Championships
Gold medal – first place	2012 Erzurum
Silver medal – second place	2013 Edinburgh

Euan Byers (born 30 July 1974) is a Scottish curler.

Byers started curling in 1983. He plays the lead position and is right-handed. Byers is a double world champion and triple European champion.

== Teammates ==
2010 Vancouver Olympic Games

David Murdoch, Skip

Ewan MacDonald, Third

Peter Smith, Second

Graeme Connal, Alternate
