= Pauli Jäämies =

Finnish curler

Medal record

Curling

Representing Finland

European Mixed Curling Championship
Bronze medal – third place	2012 Erzerum	

Pauli Jäämies (born 22 April 1985 in Clearwater, Florida) is a Finnish curler from Helsinki. He currently plays for the Finnish national team, skipped by Aku Kauste. He is known for sporting long black dreadlocks.

Jäämies made his international debut for Finland at the 2012 European Mixed Curling Championship, winning a bronze medal playing second on the team. Later that year he played for Finland at the 2012 European Curling Championships. The team, skipped by Kauste finished 11th place, and qualified for the 2013 Ford World Men's Curling Championship. At the Worlds, the Kauste rink finished last (12th), with a 2–9 record. Later in the year, the team played in the 2014 Olympic qualifying event, but failed to qualify having won just two games.

At the 2014 European Curling Championships, the team once again finished 11th, qualifying for the 2015 Ford World Men's Curling Championship. That season, Jäämies won his first World Curling Tour event as part of the Kauste team, the 2014 Edinburgh International.
