= Duncan Fernie =

Scottish curler

- Curler
- Born: 1 April 1978 (age 48)

Curling career
- World Championship: 3 (2011, 2014, 2015)
Medal record
Curling
Representing Scotland
World Curling Championships
Silver medal – second place	2011 Regina

Duncan Fernie (born 1 April 1978) is a Scottish curler from Blair Atholl. He competed at the 2015 Ford World Men's Curling Championship in Halifax, Nova Scotia, Canada, as vice-skip for the Scottish national curling team. He also competed at the 2011 World Championship, where the Scottish team won silver medals.
