= Eszter Juhász =

Finnish curler

- Curler ♀
- Born: 23 February 1988 (age 38); Hungary

Team
- Curling club: Ålands Curlingklubb rf, CC Dominant Eye ry

Curling career
- Member Association: Finland
- World Championship: 1 (2019)
- World Mixed Doubles Championship: 1 (2014)
- European Championship: 4 (2011, 2016, 2017, 2018)
Medal record
Curling
Finnish Women's Championship
Gold medal – first place	2011
Gold medal – first place	2012
Gold medal – first place	2017
Gold medal – first place	2018
Gold medal – first place	2019
Gold medal – first place	2025
Silver medal – second place	2010

Eszter Juhász (born 23 February 1988 in Hungary) is a Finnish curler. Her family moved to Finland when Juhász was at the age of 2, and she started curling in 2006 at the age of 18.

== Teams ==
=== Women's ===
Season	Skip	Third	Second	Lead	Alternate	Coach	Events
2006	Martta Kallio	Eszter Juhász	Matilda Kallio	Virpi Roine			FJCC 2006 (silver)
2007	Laura Vallinkivi	Jenni Räsänen	Jenni Sullanmaa	Milja Hellsten	Eszter Juhász		FJCC 2007 (silver)
2008	Milja Hellsten	Laura Vallinkivi	Jenni Räsänen	Jenni Sullanmaa	Eszter Juhász		FJCC 2008 (silver)
2008–09	Milja Hellsten	Laura Vallinkivi	Jenni Räsänen	Jenni Sullanmaa	Eszter Juhász		FWCC 2009 (6th)
2008–09	Tiina Holmi	Oona Kauste	Jenni Sullanmaa	Eszter Juhász		Katja Kiiskinen	EJCC 2009 (5th)
2009–10	Tiina Holmi	Sanna Puustinen	Heidi Hossi	Oona Kauste	Eszter Juhász		FWCC 2010 (silver)
2010–11	Tiina Holmi	Heidi Hossi	Oona Kauste	Sanna Puustinen	Eszter Juhász		FWCC 2011 (gold)
2011–12	Sanna Puustinen (fourth)	Heidi Hossi	Oona Kauste (skip)	Eszter Juhász	Marjo Hippi		ECC 2011 (12th)
2011–12	Oona Kauste	Marjo Hippi	Heidi Hossi	Sanna Puustinen	Eszter Juhász		FWCC 2012 (gold)
2012–13	Eszter Juhász	Jenna Uusipaavalniemi	Jenni Sullanmaa	Laura Vallinkivi	Tuire Autio, Bettina Mandelin		FWCC 2013 (4th)
2014–15	Eszter Juhász	Antonina Sorokina	Miia Turto	Mira Lehtonen	Iiris Koilahti		FWCC 2015 (5th)
2016–17	Anne Malmi	Eszter Juhász	Tiina Suuripää	Lotta Immonen	Tuire Autio	Olavi Malmi	ECC 2016 (10th)
2016–17	Oona Kauste	Milja Hellsten	Eszter Juhász	Emmi Lindroos	Jenni Räsänen, Maija Salmiovirta		FWCC 2017 (gold)
2017–18	Oona Kauste	Eszter Juhász	Maija Salmiovirta	Jenni Räsänen	Lotta Immonen	Leo Mäkelä (ECC); Perttu Piilo (OQE)	ECC 2017 (11th); OQE 2017 (7th)
2017–18	Oona Kauste	Lotta Immonen	Eszter Juhász	Jenni Räsänen	Maija Salmiovirta		FWCC 2018 (gold)
2018–19	Oona Kauste	Lotta Immonen	Eszter Juhász	Sanna Piilo	Jenni Räsänen, Maija Salmiovirta	Aku Kauste	FWCC 2019 (gold)
2018–19	Oona Kauste	Eszter Juhász	Maija Salmiovirta	Lotta Immonen	Elina Virtaala (ECC); Marjo Hippi (WCC)	Aku Kauste	ECC 2018 (9th); WQE 2019 (silver); WCC 2019 (12th)

=== Mixed ===
Season	Skip	Third	Second	Lead	Alternate	Coach	Events
2009–10	Toni Sepperi	Jere Sullanmaa	Heidi Hossi	Eszter Juhász		Jarmo Kalilainen	FMxCC 2010 (silver)
2010–11	Toni Sepperi	Jere Sullanmaa	Heidi Hossi	Eszter Juhász	Jussi Knuutinen		FMxCC 2011 (7th)
2013–14	Markku Uusipaavalniemi	Valentin Demenkov	Tuire Autio	Eszter Juhász			FMxCC 2014 (4th)

=== Mixed doubles ===
Season	Male	Female	Coach	Events
2007–08	Leo Mäkelä	Eszter Juhász		FMDCC 2008 (12th)
2008–09	Iiro Sipola	Eszter Juhász		FMDCC 2009 (12th)
2010–11	Markku Uusipaavalniemi	Eszter Juhász		FMDCC 2011 (silver)
2012–13	Markku Uusipaavalniemi	Eszter Juhász		FMDCC 2013 (4th)
2013–14	Markku Uusipaavalniemi	Eszter Juhász	Jesse Uusipaavalniemi	FMDCC 2013 (gold); WMDCC 2014 (14th)
2014–15	Markku Uusipaavalniemi	Eszter Juhász		FMDCC 2015 (5th)
2015–16	Markku Uusipaavalniemi	Eszter Juhász		FMDCC 2016 (silver)
2016–17	Markku Uusipaavalniemi	Eszter Juhász		FMDCC 2017 (silver)
2017–18	Markku Uusipaavalniemi	Eszter Juhász		FMDCC 2018 (silver)
2018–19	Markku Uusipaavalniemi	Eszter Juhász		FMDCC 2019 (silver)
