= 2015 European Curling Championships – Women's tournament =

2015 European Curling Championships Women's tournament
- Host city: Esbjerg, Denmark
- Arena: Granly Hockey Arena; Esbjerg Curling Club
- Dates: November 20–28
- Winner: Russia
- Curling club: Moskvitch CC, Moscow
- Skip: Anna Sidorova
- Third: Margarita Fomina
- Second: Alexandra Raeva
- Lead: Nkeirouka Ezekh
- Alternate: Anna Kovaleva
- Finalist: Scotland (Eve Muirhead)

The women's tournament of the 2015 European Curling Championships will be held from November 20 to 28 in Esbjerg, Denmark. The winners of the Group C tournament in Champéry, Switzerland, will move on to the Group B tournament. The top eight women's teams at the 2015 European Curling Championships will represent their respective nations at the 2016 Ford World Women's Curling Championship in Swift Current, Saskatchewan, Canada.

== Group A ==
=== Teams ===
Teams are to be announced.

Denmark	Estonia	Finland	Germany	Hungary
Skip: Lene Nielsen; Third: Helle Simonsen; Second: Stephanie Risdal Nielsen; Lead: Charlotte Clemmensen; Alternate: Isabella Clemmensen	Skip: Maile Mölder; Third: Kristiine Lill; Second: Kuellike Ustav; Lead: Triin Madisson; Alternate: Lembe Marley	Skip: Oona Kauste; Third: Milja Hellsten; Second: Maija Salmiovirta; Lead: Marjo Hippi; Alternate: Jenni Rasanen	Skip: Daniela Driendl; Third: Analena Jentsch; Second: Marika Trettin; Lead: Pia-Lisa Schöll; Alternate: Maike Beer	Skip: Dorottya Palancsa; Third: Henrietta Miklai; Second: Vera Kalocsai; Lead: Nikolett Sandor; Alternate: Timea Nagy
Norway	Russia	Scotland	Sweden	Switzerland
Skip: Kristin Skaslien; Third: Anneline Skårsmoen; Second: Julie Kjær Molnar; Lead: Kristine Davanger; Alternate: Maia Ramsfjell	Skip: Anna Sidorova; Third: Margarita Fomina; Second: Alexandra Raeva; Lead: Nkeirouka Ezekh; Alternate: Alina Kovaleva	Skip: Eve Muirhead; Third: Anna Sloan; Second: Vicki Adams; Lead: Sarah Reid; Alternate: Rachel Hannen	Skip: Cecilia Östlund; Third: Sabina Kraupp; Second: Sara Carlsson; Lead: Paulina Stein; Alternate: Anna Huhta	Skip: Alina Pätz; Third: Nadine Lehmann; Second: Marisa Winkelhausen; Lead: Nicole Schwägli; Alternate: Elena Stern

=== Round-robin standings ===
Key
Teams to Playoffs
Teams relegated to 2016 Group B

Final round-robin standings

Country	Skip	W	L	PF	PA	Ends Won	Ends Lost	Blank Ends	Stolen Ends	Shot Pct.
Russia	Anna Sidorova	8	1	79	46	42	34	4	8	80%
Scotland	Eve Muirhead	7	2	70	37	40	27	4	16	81%
Finland	Oona Kauste	6	3	57	59	32	35	7	10	74%
Denmark	Lene Nielsen	6	3	60	45	40	29	14	14	82%
Sweden	Cecilia Östlund	5	4	61	52	37	34	8	10	78%
Switzerland	Alina Pätz	4	5	58	55	38	36	6	10	78%
Germany	Daniela Driendl	4	5	59	60	39	35	9	9	80%
Norway	Kristin Skaslien	3	6	49	67	29	47	7	4	73%
Estonia	Maile Mölder	1	8	42	76	32	46	4	3	67%
Hungary	Dorottya Palancsa	1	8	42	80	35	41	3	9	72%

=== Round-robin results ===
All draw times are listed in Central European Time (UTC+01).

==== Draw 1 ====
Friday, November 20, 17:30

Sheet A	1	2	3	4	5	6	7	8	9	10	Final
Switzerland (Pätz) 🔨	1	0	1	0	0	0	0	X	X	X	2
Russia (Sidorova)	0	3	0	1	1	0	3	X	X	X	8

Sheet B	1	2	3	4	5	6	7	8	9	10	Final
Scotland (Muirhead)	0	0	1	0	0	0	1	0	X	X	2
Denmark (Nielsen) 🔨	0	2	0	1	2	0	0	2	X	X	7

Sheet C	1	2	3	4	5	6	7	8	9	10	Final
Sweden (Östlund)	4	4	0	0	2	1	X	X	X	X	11
Finland (Kauste) 🔨	0	0	1	0	0	0	X	X	X	X	1

Sheet D	1	2	3	4	5	6	7	8	9	10	Final
Germany (Driendl) 🔨	1	0	4	0	1	1	1	1	X	X	9
Estonia (Mölder)	0	1	0	1	0	0	0	0	X	X	2

Sheet E	1	2	3	4	5	6	7	8	9	10	Final
Norway (Skaslien) 🔨	2	0	0	0	0	1	0	2	0	0	5
Hungary (Palancsa)	0	1	1	1	1	0	1	0	2	1	8

==== Draw 2 ====
Saturday, November 21, 14:00

Sheet A	1	2	3	4	5	6	7	8	9	10	Final
Denmark (Nielsen)	0	0	0	0	2	0	0	3	1	X	6
Germany (Driendl) 🔨	0	0	1	1	0	0	1	0	0	X	3

Sheet B	1	2	3	4	5	6	7	8	9	10	Final
Russia (Sidorova) 🔨	0	2	0	0	2	0	1	0	1	2	8
Estonia (Mölder)	1	0	1	0	0	1	0	2	0	0	5

Sheet C	1	2	3	4	5	6	7	8	9	10	Final
Norway (Skaslien)	0	0	1	0	0	1	1	0	0	X	3
Switzerland (Pätz) 🔨	1	1	0	0	1	0	0	2	1	X	6

Sheet D	1	2	3	4	5	6	7	8	9	10	Final
Hungary (Palancsa)	0	2	1	0	2	1	0	0	1	X	7
Finland (Kauste) 🔨	1	0	0	4	0	0	2	5	0	X	12

Sheet E	1	2	3	4	5	6	7	8	9	10	Final
Scotland (Muirhead)	0	4	2	0	2	1	2	X	X	X	11
Sweden (Östlund) 🔨	1	0	0	2	0	0	0	X	X	X	3

==== Draw 3 ====
Sunday, November 22, 8:00

Sheet A	1	2	3	4	5	6	7	8	9	10	Final
Finland (Kauste)	0	0	0	0	1	0	X	X	X	X	1
Scotland (Muirhead) 🔨	1	2	3	1	0	1	X	X	X	X	8

Sheet B	1	2	3	4	5	6	7	8	9	10	Final
Switzerland (Pätz)	1	1	0	3	6	1	X	X	X	X	12
Hungary (Palancsa) 🔨	0	0	1	0	0	0	X	X	X	X	1

Sheet C	1	2	3	4	5	6	7	8	9	10	Final
Russia (Sidorova) 🔨	2	0	0	2	0	2	0	2	1	X	9
Germany (Driendl)	0	1	1	0	1	0	1	0	0	X	4

Sheet D	1	2	3	4	5	6	7	8	9	10	Final
Sweden (Östlund)	1	0	2	1	1	1	3	X	X	X	9
Norway (Skaslien) 🔨	0	1	0	0	0	0	0	X	X	X	1

Sheet E	1	2	3	4	5	6	7	8	9	10	Final
Denmark (Nielsen) 🔨	2	0	1	0	3	1	0	0	2	0	9
Estonia (Mölder)	0	2	0	1	0	0	1	2	0	1	7

==== Draw 4 ====
Sunday, November 22, 16:00

Sheet A	1	2	3	4	5	6	7	8	9	10	Final
Estonia (Mölder)	1	0	1	0	0	1	0	2	1	0	6
Norway (Skaslien) 🔨	0	3	0	1	1	0	1	0	0	3	9

Sheet B	1	2	3	4	5	6	7	8	9	10	Final
Sweden (Östlund)	0	0	0	2	0	1	0	0	1	0	4
Germany (Driendl) 🔨	0	2	1	0	1	0	0	2	0	1	7

Sheet C	1	2	3	4	5	6	7	8	9	10	Final
Hungary (Palancsa)	0	1	0	1	0	0	2	1	0	0	5
Denmark (Nielsen) 🔨	1	0	2	0	1	1	0	0	0	2	7

Sheet D	1	2	3	4	5	6	7	8	9	10	Final
Finland (Kauste)	0	0	0	1	1	0	2	2	2	X	8
Switzerland (Pätz) 🔨	1	0	1	0	0	1	0	0	0	X	3

Sheet E	1	2	3	4	5	6	7	8	9	10	Final
Russia (Sidorova)	1	0	2	0	2	0	1	0	1	0	7
Scotland (Muirhead) 🔨	0	1	0	2	0	1	0	1	0	1	6

==== Draw 5 ====
Monday, November 23, 14:00

Sheet A	1	2	3	4	5	6	7	8	9	10	Final
Sweden (Östlund) 🔨	0	1	0	0	0	0	0	0	X	X	1
Denmark (Nielsen)	0	0	0	2	2	1	1	2	X	X	8

Sheet B	1	2	3	4	5	6	7	8	9	10	Final
Norway (Skaslien)	0	1	4	0	2	0	1	0	1	0	9
Russia (Sidorova) 🔨	1	0	0	1	0	2	0	2	0	1	7

Sheet C	1	2	3	4	5	6	7	8	9	10	Final
Switzerland (Pätz) 🔨	2	0	4	1	1	0	1	0	1	X	10
Estonia (Mölder)	0	2	0	0	0	2	0	1	0	X	5

Sheet D	1	2	3	4	5	6	7	8	9	10	Final
Scotland (Muirhead)	0	1	3	1	2	0	0	2	X	X	9
Hungary (Palancsa) 🔨	1	0	0	0	0	1	1	0	X	X	3

Sheet E	1	2	3	4	5	6	7	8	9	10	Final
Germany (Driendl)	0	0	2	0	0	1	0	2	0	X	5
Finland (Kauste) 🔨	2	1	0	1	1	0	3	0	4	X	12

==== Draw 6 ====
Tuesday, November 24, 9:00

Sheet A	1	2	3	4	5	6	7	8	9	10	Final
Norway (Skaslien)	0	0	1	0	0	3	0	0	2	0	6
Finland (Kauste) 🔨	2	1	0	1	2	0	0	1	0	1	8

Sheet B	1	2	3	4	5	6	7	8	9	10	Final
Denmark (Nielsen)	0	2	0	1	0	0	2	1	0	1	7
Switzerland (Pätz) 🔨	0	0	1	0	2	0	0	0	1	0	4

Sheet C	1	2	3	4	5	6	7	8	9	10	Final
Germany (Driendl)	0	1	0	2	0	0	2	0	1	0	6
Scotland (Muirhead) 🔨	3	0	1	0	1	0	0	2	0	1	8

Sheet D	1	2	3	4	5	6	7	8	9	10	Final
Estonia (Mölder)	0	1	0	1	0	0	1	0	1	0	4
Sweden (Östlund) 🔨	2	0	1	0	0	1	0	1	0	3	8

Sheet E	1	2	3	4	5	6	7	8	9	10	Final
Hungary (Palancsa)	0	1	0	2	0	1	0	1	X	X	5
Russia (Sidorova) 🔨	2	0	4	0	3	0	2	0	X	X	11

==== Draw 7 ====
Tuesday, November 24, 19:00

Sheet A	1	2	3	4	5	6	7	8	9	10	Final
Scotland (Muirhead)	3	1	1	0	0	5	X	X	X	X	10
Estonia (Mölder) 🔨	0	0	0	1	0	0	X	X	X	X	1

Sheet B	1	2	3	4	5	6	7	8	9	10	Final
Hungary (Palancsa)	0	0	1	0	0	0	1	0	0	X	2
Sweden (Östlund) 🔨	0	1	0	1	2	2	0	1	1	X	8

Sheet C	1	2	3	4	5	6	7	8	9	10	Final
Finland (Kauste)	0	0	0	0	1	0	X	X	X	X	1
Russia (Sidorova) 🔨	0	3	1	4	0	1	X	X	X	X	9

Sheet D	1	2	3	4	5	6	7	8	9	10	Final
Norway (Skaslien) 🔨	0	0	3	0	1	0	0	2	2	X	8
Denmark (Nielsen)	0	0	0	1	0	2	2	0	0	X	5

Sheet E	1	2	3	4	5	6	7	8	9	10	Final
Switzerland (Pätz) 🔨	3	0	1	0	2	0	2	0	0	2	10
Germany (Driendl)	0	2	0	2	0	2	0	1	1	0	8

==== Draw 8 ====
Wednesday, November 25, 12:00

Sheet A	1	2	3	4	5	6	7	8	9	10	11	Final
Russia (Sidorova) 🔨	1	0	0	2	0	1	0	2	0	3	3	12
Sweden (Östlund)	0	2	0	0	4	0	2	0	1	0	0	9

Sheet B	1	2	3	4	5	6	7	8	9	10	Final
Germany (Driendl) 🔨	0	2	0	0	4	1	0	1	1	X	9
Norway (Skaslien)	0	0	3	0	0	0	1	0	0	X	4

Sheet C	1	2	3	4	5	6	7	8	9	10	Final
Estonia (Mölder) 🔨	3	0	0	2	0	1	0	1	0	1	8
Hungary (Palancsa)	0	1	1	0	1	0	2	0	1	0	6

Sheet D	1	2	3	4	5	6	7	8	9	10	Final
Switzerland (Pätz) 🔨	1	2	0	0	0	0	1	0	1	X	5
Scotland (Muirhead)	0	0	3	2	1	0	0	1	0	X	7

Sheet E	1	2	3	4	5	6	7	8	9	10	Final
Finland (Kauste) 🔨	0	0	3	0	0	2	0	2	0	0	7
Denmark (Nielsen)	0	0	0	1	1	0	2	0	1	1	6

==== Draw 9 ====
Wednesday, November 25, 20:00

Sheet A	1	2	3	4	5	6	7	8	9	10	Final
Germany (Driendl) 🔨	0	0	1	0	3	0	2	0	2	X	8
Hungary (Palancsa)	0	1	0	1	0	2	0	1	0	X	5

Sheet B	1	2	3	4	5	6	7	8	9	10	Final
Estonia (Mölder)	0	0	1	0	0	1	0	2	0	X	4
Finland (Kauste) 🔨	3	1	0	1	1	0	0	0	1	X	7

Sheet C	1	2	3	4	5	6	7	8	9	10	Final
Scotland (Muirhead)	1	0	1	0	0	2	0	4	1	X	9
Norway (Skaslien) 🔨	0	1	0	1	0	0	2	0	0	X	4

Sheet D	1	2	3	4	5	6	7	8	9	10	Final
Denmark (Nielsen) 🔨	1	0	1	0	1	1	0	1	0	X	5
Russia (Sidorova)	0	4	0	2	0	0	1	0	1	X	8

Sheet E	1	2	3	4	5	6	7	8	9	10	11	Final
Sweden (Östlund) 🔨	1	1	0	0	1	0	2	0	1	0	2	8
Switzerland (Pätz)	0	0	2	1	0	1	0	1	0	1	0	6

=== World Challenge Games ===
The World Challenge Games are held between the eighth-ranked team in the Group A round robin and the winner of the Group B tournament to determine which of these two teams will play at the World Championships.

==== Challenge 1 ====
Friday, November 27, 19:00

Team	1	2	3	4	5	6	7	8	9	10	Final
Norway (Skaslien)	0	1	1	0	0	0	1	0	1	X	4
Italy (Apollonio) 🔨	1	0	0	0	2	2	0	2	0	X	7

==== Challenge 2 ====
Saturday, November 28, 9:00

Team	1	2	3	4	5	6	7	8	9	10	Final
Norway (Skaslien) 🔨	1	0	0	3	0	3	0	0	0	1	8
Italy (Apollonio)	0	0	1	0	2	0	1	1	1	0	6

==== Challenge 3 ====
Saturday, November 28, 14:00

Team	1	2	3	4	5	6	7	8	9	10	Final
Norway (Skaslien)	0	0	0	1	0	0	0	1	0	X	2
Italy (Apollonio) 🔨	0	0	1	0	1	1	1	0	4	X	8

=== Playoffs ===
Semifinals
1	Russia	6
4	Denmark	5
2	Scotland	9
3	Finland	7

Final
1	Russia	6
2	Scotland	4

Bronze medal game
4	Denmark	8
3	Finland	10

==== Semifinals ====
Thursday, November 26, 19:00

Team	1	2	3	4	5	6	7	8	9	10	Final
Russia (Sidorova) 🔨	1	0	0	2	0	1	0	1	0	1	6
Denmark (Nielsen)	0	2	0	0	0	0	1	0	2	0	5

Player percentages
Russia		Denmark	
Nkeiruka Ezekh	88%	Charlotte Clemmensen	84%
Alexandra Raeva	78%	Stephenie Risdal Nielsen	83%
Margarita Fomina	81%	Helle Simonsen	74%
Anna Sidorova	81%	Lene Nielsen	80%
Total	82%	Total	80%

Team	1	2	3	4	5	6	7	8	9	10	Final
Scotland (Muirhead) 🔨	0	0	0	3	1	0	2	2	0	1	9
Finland (Kauste)	2	2	1	0	0	1	0	0	1	0	7

Player percentages
Scotland		Finland	
Sarah Reid	94%	Marjo Hippi	78%
Vicki Adams	79%	Maija Salmiovirta	76%
Anna Sloan	73%	Milja Hellsten	68%
Eve Muirhead	74%	Oona Kauste	63%
Total	80%	Total	71%

==== Bronze medal game ====
Friday, November 27, 19:00

Team	1	2	3	4	5	6	7	8	9	10	Final
Denmark (Nielsen)	0	1	0	2	0	2	0	0	3	0	8
Finland (Kauste) 🔨	1	0	1	0	4	0	1	2	0	1	10

Player percentages
Denmark		Finland	
Charlotte Clemmensen	90%	Marjo Hippi	80%
Stephenie Risdal Nielsen	89%	Maija Salmiovirta	88%
Helle Simonsen	94%	Milja Hellsten	68%
Lene Nielsen	85%	Oona Kauste	88%
Total	90%	Total	81%

==== Gold medal game ====
Saturday, November 28, 15:00

Team	1	2	3	4	5	6	7	8	9	10	Final
Russia (Sidorova) 🔨	0	2	0	1	0	1	0	1	0	1	6
Scotland (Muirhead)	0	0	2	0	1	0	0	0	1	0	4

Player percentages
Russia		Scotland	
Nkeiruka Ezekh	93%	Sarah Reid	91%
Alexandra Raeva	93%	Vicki Adams	89%
Margarita Fomina	76%	Anna Sloan	89%
Anna Sidorova	88%	Eve Muirhead	79%
Total	88%	Total	87%

=== Player percentages ===
Round Robin only

Leads	%
(Germany) Pia-Lisa Schöll	86
(Scotland) Sarah Reid	86
(Denmark) Charlotte Clemmensen	85
(Finland) Marjo Hippi	84
(Switzerland) Nicole Schwägli	81

Seconds	%
(Russia) Alexandra Raeva	80
(Switzerland) Marisa Winkelhausen	80
(Scotland) Vicki Adams	80
(Sweden) Sara Carlsson	79
(Germany) Marika Trettin	79

Thirds	%
(Russia) Margarita Fomina	82
(Germany) Analena Jentsch	82
(Denmark) Helle Simonsen	81
(Scotland) Anna Sloan	79
(Sweden) Sabina Kraupp	79

Skips/Fourths	%
(Denmark) Lene Nielsen	84
(Russia) Anna Sidorova	81
(Scotland) Eve Muirhead	80
(Switzerland) Alina Pätz	77
(Germany) Daniela Driendl	74

== Group B ==
=== Teams ===
Austria	Czech Republic	England	France	Italy
Skip: Hannah Augustin; Third: Anna Weghuber; Second: Marijke Reitsma; Lead: Elisabeth Trauner; Alternate: Rebecca Csenar	Skip: Anna Kubešková; Third: Alžběta Baudyšová; Second: Tereza Plíšková; Lead: Klára Svatoňová; Alternate: Ežen Kolčevská	Skip: Anna Fowler; Third: Hetty Garnier; Second: Angharad Ward; Lead: Lauren Pearce; Alternate: Naomi Robinson	Skip: Pauline Jeanneret; Third: Manon Humbert; Second: Malaurie Boissenin; Lead: Elisa Pagnier; Alternate: Axelle Chiffre	Skip: Federica Apollonio; Third: Stefania Menardi; Second: Chiara Olivieri; Lead: Claudia Alvera; Alternate: Maria Gaspari
Latvia	Netherlands	Poland	Slovakia	Turkey
Skip: Evita Regža; Third: Dace Regža; Second: Jelena Rudzite; Lead: Sabina Jeske; Alternate: Santa Blumberga	Skip: Marianne Neeleman; Third: Kimberly Honders; Second: Shirley Miog; Lead: Bonnie Nilhamn; Alternate: Pamela Broks	Skip: Marta Szeliga-Frynia; Third: Magdalena Kolodjiej; Second: Justyna Beck; Lead: Barbara Kawat	Skip: Gabriela Kajanova; Third: Silvia Sykorova; Second: Linda Haferova; Lead: Terezia Gabovicova; Alternate: Veronika Kvasnovska	Skip: Dilşat Yıldız; Third: Öznur Polat; Second: Semiha Konuksever; Lead: Ayşe Gözütok; Alternate: Özlem Polat

=== Round-robin standings ===
Key
Teams to Playoffs
Teams to Tiebreaker
Teams relegated to 2016 Group C

Final round-robin standings

Country	Skip	W	L
Italy	Federica Apollonio	7	2
Latvia	Evita Regža	7	2
Czech Republic	Anna Kubešková	7	2
Turkey	Dilşat Yıldız	6	3
England	Anna Fowler	6	3
Poland	Marta Szeliga-Frynia	5	4
Slovakia	Gabriela Kajanova	3	6
Netherlands	Marianne Neeleman	2	7
France	Pauline Jeanneret	1	8
Austria	Hannah Augustin	1	8

=== Round-robin results ===
All draw times are listed in Central European Time (UTC+01).

==== Draw 1 ====
Thursday, November 19, 20:00

Sheet A	1	2	3	4	5	6	7	8	9	10	Final
Netherlands (Neeleman) 🔨	2	0	1	0	0	0	0	0	2	X	5
Slovakia (Kajanova)	0	1	0	0	0	0	0	0	0	X	1

Sheet B	1	2	3	4	5	6	7	8	9	10	Final
France (Jeanneret)	0	0	0	2	1	0	0	1	0	X	4
Turkey (Yıldız) 🔨	0	0	0	0	0	3	2	0	4	X	9

Sheet D	1	2	3	4	5	6	7	8	9	10	Final
Poland (Szeliga-Frynia)	0	0	0	2	0	2	0	0	2	0	6
Latvia (Regža) 🔨	0	2	1	0	2	0	0	1	0	1	7

==== Draw 2 ====
Friday, November 20, 12:00

Sheet A	1	2	3	4	5	6	7	8	9	10	Final
Italy (Apollonio)	0	0	3	0	1	0	0	2	1	X	L
England (Fowler) 🔨	2	1	0	1	0	2	3	0	0	X	W

Italy forfeited the game because they ran out of time.

Sheet B	1	2	3	4	5	6	7	8	9	10	Final
Latvia (Regža)	0	0	2	0	1	1	0	2	0	1	7
Czech Republic (Kubešková) 🔨	0	1	0	1	0	0	1	0	2	0	5

Sheet C	1	2	3	4	5	6	7	8	9	10	Final
Netherlands (Neeleman)	0	0	0	0	1	0	0	1	X	X	2
Poland (Szeliga-Frynia) 🔨	2	1	0	2	0	4	1	0	X	X	10

Sheet D	1	2	3	4	5	6	7	8	9	10	Final
Turkey (Yıldız)	2	0	4	0	0	4	0	2	0	X	12
Austria (Augustin) 🔨	0	1	0	1	1	0	1	0	0	X	4

==== Draw 3 ====
Saturday, November 21, 8:00

Sheet A	1	2	3	4	5	6	7	8	9	10	Final
France (Jeanneret)	0	0	0	0	2	0	1	0	X	X	3
Slovakia (Kajanova) 🔨	1	2	1	3	0	1	0	4	X	X	12

Sheet B	1	2	3	4	5	6	7	8	9	10	Final
Netherlands (Neeleman)	0	0	2	1	0	0	1	0	0	X	4
Italy (Apollonio) 🔨	2	0	0	0	2	3	0	2	1	X	10

Sheet C	1	2	3	4	5	6	7	8	9	10	Final
Austria (Augustin) 🔨	3	0	0	2	1	0	0	1	0	1	8
Latvia (Regža)	0	5	1	0	0	1	1	0	2	0	10

Sheet D	1	2	3	4	5	6	7	8	9	10	Final
Czech Republic (Kubešková) 🔨	0	2	0	0	1	0	3	0	1	1	8
England (Fowler)	0	0	1	1	0	3	0	1	0	0	6

==== Draw 4 ====
Saturday, November 21, 16:00

Sheet F	1	2	3	4	5	6	7	8	9	10	Final
Austria (Augustin)	0	0	0	0	1	0	X	X	X	X	1
Czech Republic (Kubešková) 🔨	5	2	2	2	0	3	X	X	X	X	14

Sheet G	1	2	3	4	5	6	7	8	9	10	Final
Slovakia (Kajanova) 🔨	2	0	2	0	3	0	5	X	X	X	12
Poland (Szeliga-Frynia)	0	1	0	1	0	1	0	X	X	X	3

Sheet H	1	2	3	4	5	6	7	8	9	10	Final
England (Fowler) 🔨	3	0	2	0	3	0	0	0	1	0	9
Turkey (Yıldız)	0	1	0	3	0	1	3	1	0	1	10

Sheet J	1	2	3	4	5	6	7	8	9	10	Final
France (Jeanneret)	0	0	0	1	0	3	0	1	0	X	5
Italy (Apollonio) 🔨	1	1	2	0	1	0	2	0	5	X	12

==== Draw 5 ====
Sunday, November 22, 8:00

Sheet A	1	2	3	4	5	6	7	8	9	10	Final
Latvia (Regža)	0	0	1	0	1	1	0	0	1	X	4
Italy (Apollonio) 🔨	1	0	0	2	0	0	3	1	0	X	7

Sheet B	1	2	3	4	5	6	7	8	9	10	Final
Austria (Augustin) 🔨	1	0	0	0	0	0	1	2	2	X	6
Netherlands (Neeleman)	0	0	1	0	0	1	0	0	0	X	2

Sheet C	1	2	3	4	5	6	7	8	9	10	Final
France (Jeanneret) 🔨	1	1	0	1	0	2	0	2	0	0	7
Czech Republic (Kubešková)	0	0	2	0	3	0	2	0	2	1	10

Sheet D	1	2	3	4	5	6	7	8	9	10	Final
England (Fowler)	2	0	0	3	0	2	2	X	X	X	9
Slovakia (Kajanova) 🔨	0	0	1	0	1	0	0	X	X	X	2

==== Draw 6 ====
Monday, November 23, 12:00

Sheet A	1	2	3	4	5	6	7	8	9	10	Final
Turkey (Yıldız) 🔨	1	1	1	0	0	1	0	0	0	0	4
Poland (Szeliga-Frynia)	0	0	0	1	2	0	0	1	1	1	6

Sheet B	1	2	3	4	5	6	7	8	9	10	Final
Latvia (Regža) 🔨	0	0	1	0	4	4	0	0	0	1	10
England (Fowler)	1	0	0	1	0	0	2	1	1	0	6

Sheet C	1	2	3	4	5	6	7	8	9	10	Final
Italy (Apollonio)	0	1	2	0	5	1	0	X	X	X	9
Austria (Augustin) 🔨	1	0	0	0	0	0	1	X	X	X	2

Sheet D	1	2	3	4	5	6	7	8	9	10	11	Final
Netherlands (Neeleman) 🔨	0	0	2	0	2	0	1	0	0	2	/	L
Czech Republic (Kubešková)	0	1	0	2	0	1	0	2	1	0		W

Netherlands forfeited the game because they ran out of time.

==== Draw 7 ====
Monday, November 23, 20:00

Sheet A	1	2	3	4	5	6	7	8	9	10	Final
England (Fowler) 🔨	0	1	1	2	0	1	1	3	X	X	9
Netherlands (Neeleman)	0	0	0	0	2	0	0	0	X	X	2

Sheet B	1	2	3	4	5	6	7	8	9	10	Final
Czech Republic (Kubešková) 🔨	0	1	2	0	0	2	1	0	2	0	8
Poland (Szeliga-Frynia)	1	0	0	1	3	0	0	2	0	0	7

Sheet C	1	2	3	4	5	6	7	8	9	10	Final
Austria (Augustin)	0	0	1	1	0	1	0	1	0	X	4
France (Jeanneret) 🔨	0	4	0	0	1	0	2	0	4	X	11

Sheet D	1	2	3	4	5	6	7	8	9	10	Final
Turkey (Yıldız) 🔨	2	0	1	0	1	0	2	0	3	X	9
Slovakia (Kajanova)	0	1	0	1	0	1	0	2	0	X	5

==== Draw 8 ====
Tuesday, November 24, 12:00

Sheet A	1	2	3	4	5	6	7	8	9	10	Final
Czech Republic (Kubešková)	0	0	0	2	0	1	0	2	0	2	7
Turkey (Yıldız) 🔨	0	1	0	0	0	0	1	0	4	0	6

Sheet B	1	2	3	4	5	6	7	8	9	10	Final
Netherlands (Neeleman) 🔨	0	2	0	1	0	1	2	0	1	X	7
Latvia (Regža)	2	0	1	0	5	0	0	1	0	X	9

Sheet C	1	2	3	4	5	6	7	8	9	10	Final
Austria (Augustin)	0	0	1	0	2	1	0	0	X	X	4
England (Fowler) 🔨	3	2	0	2	0	0	1	1	X	X	9

Sheet D	1	2	3	4	5	6	7	8	9	10	Final
Italy (Apollonio) 🔨	2	0	0	1	1	0	0	1	0	0	5
Poland (Szeliga-Frynia)	0	1	1	0	0	1	1	0	1	1	6

==== Draw 9 ====
Tuesday, November 24, 20:00

Sheet B	1	2	3	4	5	6	7	8	9	10	Final
Slovakia (Kajanova)	0	1	0	0	0	4	0	3	0	X	8
Austria (Augustin) 🔨	0	0	0	0	1	0	1	0	1	X	3

Sheet B	1	2	3	4	5	6	7	8	9	10	Final
England (Fowler) 🔨	3	0	4	3	0	4	X	X	X	X	14
France (Jeanneret)	0	1	0	0	2	0	X	X	X	X	3

Sheet C	1	2	3	4	5	6	7	8	9	10	Final
Czech Republic (Kubešková)	0	0	1	2	0	0	2	0	0	X	5
Italy (Apollonio) 🔨	0	0	0	0	1	2	0	2	2	X	7

Sheet D	1	2	3	4	5	6	7	8	9	10	Final
Latvia (Regža) 🔨	2	0	0	0	0	2	0	1	0	0	5
Turkey (Yıldız)	0	0	1	2	1	0	1	0	1	1	7

==== Draw 10 ====
Wednesday, November 25, 12:00

Sheet A	1	2	3	4	5	6	7	8	9	10	Final
France (Jeanneret)	0	1	0	0	0	0	X	X	X	X	1
Latvia (Regža) 🔨	2	0	2	1	2	2	X	X	X	X	9

Sheet B	1	2	3	4	5	6	7	8	9	10	Final
Poland (Szeliga-Frynia) 🔨	0	0	4	0	1	0	0	1	0	1	7
Austria (Augustin)	1	1	0	0	0	1	0	0	1	0	4

Sheet C	1	2	3	4	5	6	7	8	9	10	Final
Turkey (Yıldız)	0	0	0	0	0	1	0	2	0	1	4
Netherlands (Neeleman) 🔨	0	1	0	0	0	0	2	0	0	0	3

Sheet D	1	2	3	4	5	6	7	8	9	10	Final
Slovakia (Kajanova) 🔨	0	1	0	0	1	0	2	0	0	X	4
Czech Republic (Kubešková)	1	0	1	2	0	3	0	1	1	X	9

==== Draw 11 ====
Wednesday, November 25, 20:00

Sheet A	1	2	3	4	5	6	7	8	9	10	Final
Poland (Szeliga-Frynia) 🔨	0	1	0	0	1	0	0	1	0	X	3
England (Fowler)	0	0	2	2	0	2	1	0	2	X	9

Sheet B	1	2	3	4	5	6	7	8	9	10	11	Final
Turkey (Yıldız)	0	2	0	1	1	1	0	0	0	0	0	5
Italy (Apollonio) 🔨	1	0	2	0	0	0	0	0	1	1	1	6

Sheet C	1	2	3	4	5	6	7	8	9	10	Final
Latvia (Regža) 🔨	1	2	0	2	0	0	2	2	0	X	9
Slovakia (Kajanova)	0	0	1	0	1	1	0	0	1	X	4

Sheet D	1	2	3	4	5	6	7	8	9	10	Final
France (Jeanneret)	1	0	0	0	0	3	0	1	0	0	5
Netherlands (Neeleman) 🔨	0	0	1	0	2	0	1	0	1	3	8

==== Draw 12 ====
Thursday, November 26, 12:00

Sheet B	1	2	3	4	5	6	7	8	9	10	Final
Poland (Szeliga-Frynia) 🔨	1	0	0	0	1	1	1	1	1	X	6
France (Jeanneret)	0	2	0	1	0	0	0	0	0	X	3

Sheet C	1	2	3	4	5	6	7	8	9	10	Final
Italy (Apollonio) 🔨	1	0	0	1	4	3	X	X	X	X	9
Slovakia (Kajanova)	0	0	1	0	0	0	X	X	X	X	1

=== Tiebreaker ===
Thursday, November 26, 16:00

Team	1	2	3	4	5	6	7	8	9	10	Final
Turkey (Yıldız) 🔨	2	1	0	2	0	1	0	0	1	0	7
England (Fowler)	0	0	2	0	3	0	0	1	0	2	8

=== Playoffs ===
Semifinals
1	Italy	7
4	England	3
2	Latvia	5
3	Czech Republic	7

Final
1	Italy	7
3	Czech Republic	6

Bronze medal game
4	England	7
2	Latvia	8

==== Semifinals ====
Thursday, November 26, 20:00

Sheet B	1	2	3	4	5	6	7	8	9	10	Final
Italy (Apollonio) 🔨	1	0	0	0	0	0	2	0	0	4	7
England (Fowler)	0	0	1	0	0	0	0	0	2	0	3

Sheet A	1	2	3	4	5	6	7	8	9	10	Final
Latvia (Regža) 🔨	2	0	0	0	1	0	0	2	0	X	5
Czech Republic (Kubešková)	0	1	0	3	0	0	2	0	1	X	7

==== Bronze medal game ====
Friday, November 27, 13:30

Team	1	2	3	4	5	6	7	8	9	10	Final
England (Fowler)	0	3	0	1	1	0	0	0	0	2	7
Latvia (Regža) 🔨	2	0	1	0	0	2	1	1	1	0	8

==== Gold medal game ====
Friday, November 27, 13:30

Team	1	2	3	4	5	6	7	8	9	10	11	Final
Italy (Apollonio) 🔨	1	0	1	0	0	0	2	0	2	0	1	7
Czech Republic (Kubešková)	0	1	0	0	0	1	0	1	0	3	0	6

== Group C ==
=== Teams ===
Belarus	Croatia	France	Ireland
Skip: Alina Pavlyuchik; Third: Daria Bogatova; Second: Natallia Sviarzhynskaya; Lead: Aryna Sviarzhynskaya; Alternate: Marharyta Dziashuk	Skip: Iva Penava; Third: Iva Roso; Second: Anita Sajfar; Lead: Lucija Fabijanic; Alternate: Antonia Maricevic	Skip: Pauline Jeanneret; Third: Manon Humbert; Second: Elisa Pagnier; Lead: Malaurie Boissenin; Alternate: Laura Girardet	Skip: Alison Fyfe; Third: Katie Kerr; Second: Ailsa Anderson; Lead: Clare McCormick; Alternate: Hazel Gormley-Leahy
Romania	Slovakia	Slovenia	Spain
Skip: Raluca Daiana Colceriu; Third: Bianca Neagoe; Second: Cristina Alina Marin; Lead: Ana-Maria Saracu	Skip: Gabriela Kajanova; Third: Silvia Sykorova; Second: Linda Haferova; Lead: Terezia Gabovicova; Alternate: Veronika Kvasnovska	Skip: Nina Kremzar; Third: Spela Bizjan; Second: Patricija Cerne; Lead: Gaja Plazl; Alternate: Eva Sever	Skip: Irantzu Garcia Vez; Third: Maria Fernandez Picado; Second: Sorkunde Vez Bilbao; Lead: Onditz Pereira Nart; Alternate: Raquel Pascua Maestro

=== Round-robin standings ===
Final round-robin standings

Key
Teams to Playoffs
Teams to Tiebreaker

Country	Skip	W	L
France	Pauline Jeanneret	6	1
Slovakia	Nina Kremzar	6	1
Belarus	Alina Pavlyuchik	4	3
Ireland	Alison Fyfe	3	4
Spain	Irantzu Garcia	3	4
Slovenia	Gabriela Kajanova	3	4
Croatia	Iva Penava	2	5
Romania	Raluca Daiana Colceriu	1	6

=== Round-robin results ===
==== Draw 1 ====
Monday, October 12, 16:30

Sheet F	1	2	3	4	5	6	7	8	Final
Slovakia (Kajanova)	0	0	4	0	0	6	0	2	12
Ireland (Fyfe) 🔨	3	2	0	2	1	0	1	0	9

==== Draw 3 ====
Tuesday, October 13, 12:00

Sheet B	1	2	3	4	5	6	7	8	Final
Croatia (Penava)	0	0	3	0	0	1	0	3	7
France (Jeanneret) 🔨	1	2	0	3	1	0	1	0	8

Sheet C	1	2	3	4	5	6	7	8	Final
Belarus (Pavlyuchik) 🔨	0	2	0	0	0	1	0	1	4
Spain (Garcia)	0	0	1	1	1	0	0	0	3

Sheet D	1	2	3	4	5	6	7	8	9	Final
Ireland (Fyfe)	0	0	0	1	0	2	0	3	0	6
Slovenia (Kremzar) 🔨	0	0	2	0	2	0	2	0	1	7

Sheet E	1	2	3	4	5	6	7	8	Final
Slovakia (Kajanova) 🔨	4	3	0	0	4	4	X	X	15
Romania (Colceriu)	0	0	1	1	0	0	X	X	2

==== Draw 4 ====
Tuesday, October 13, 16:00

Sheet F	1	2	3	4	5	6	7	8	Final
Romania (Colceriu)	0	2	0	0	1	0	2	0	5
Slovenia (Kremzar) 🔨	2	0	0	1	0	2	0	1	6

==== Draw 5 ====
Tuesday, October 13, 20:00

Sheet F	1	2	3	4	5	6	7	8	Final
Belarus (Pavlyuchik) 🔨	0	2	0	0	2	0	0	0	4
Croatia (Penava)	1	0	0	1	0	1	2	1	6

==== Draw 6 ====
Wednesday, October 14, 8:00

Sheet B	1	2	3	4	5	6	7	8	Final
Belarus (Pavlyuchik)	0	0	2	1	0	2	2	X	7
Slovenia (Kremzar) 🔨	1	0	0	0	2	0	0	X	3

Sheet C	1	2	3	4	5	6	7	8	Final
Slovakia (Kajanova) 🔨	0	0	0	2	0	0	1	X	3
France (Jeanneret)	0	3	2	0	1	2	0	X	8

Sheet D	1	2	3	4	5	6	7	8	Final
Spain (Garcia) 🔨	3	0	0	2	5	0	0	X	10
Romania (Colceriu)	0	2	1	0	0	1	0	X	4

Sheet E	1	2	3	4	5	6	7	8	Final
Ireland (Fyfe) 🔨	1	0	1	2	0	4	0	X	8
Croatia (Penava)	0	0	0	0	2	0	1	X	3

==== Draw 8 ====
Wednesday, October 14, 16:00

Sheet B	1	2	3	4	5	6	7	8	Final
Romania (Colceriu)	0	2	1	0	0	0	X	X	3
Croatia (Penava) 🔨	4	0	0	2	1	3	X	X	10

Sheet C	1	2	3	4	5	6	7	8	Final
Spain (Garcia)	0	0	3	0	0	0	X	X	3
Ireland (Fyfe) 🔨	2	1	0	2	1	2	X	X	8

Sheet D	1	2	3	4	5	6	7	8	Final
Slovakia (Kajanova) 🔨	0	0	2	0	1	0	0	0	3
Belarus (Pavlyuchik)	0	0	0	0	0	0	1	0	1

Sheet E	1	2	3	4	5	6	7	8	Final
France (Jeanneret) 🔨	1	0	1	1	1	0	2	X	6
Slovenia (Kremzar)	0	0	0	0	0	1	0	X	1

==== Draw 11 ====
Thursday, October 15, 12:00

Sheet B	1	2	3	4	5	6	7	8	Final
Spain (Garcia) 🔨	1	0	0	0	2	2	2	X	7
Slovakia (Kajanova)	0	5	1	3	0	0	0	X	9

Sheet C	1	2	3	4	5	6	7	8	Final
Slovenia (Kremzar) 🔨	1	0	1	0	1	2	0	0	5
Croatia (Penava)	0	1	0	1	0	0	1	1	4

Sheet D	1	2	3	4	5	6	7	8	Final
Romania (Colceriu) 🔨	1	0	0	0	5	0	0	0	6
France (Jeanneret)	0	2	2	3	0	0	1	1	9

Sheet E	1	2	3	4	5	6	7	8	Final
Belarus (Pavlyuchik)	0	1	1	0	1	0	5	X	8
Ireland (Fyfe) 🔨	1	0	0	1	0	1	0	X	3

==== Draw 13 ====
Thursday, October 15, 20:00

Sheet F	1	2	3	4	5	6	7	8	Final
Spain (Garcia) 🔨	1	0	0	3	0	1	0	X	5
France (Jeanneret)	0	3	1	0	1	0	4	X	9

==== Draw 14 ====
Friday, October 16, 8:00

Sheet B	1	2	3	4	5	6	7	8	Final
Ireland (Fyfe)	0	0	1	0	2	0	1	X	4
Romania (Colceriu) 🔨	2	1	0	5	0	4	0	X	12

Sheet C	1	2	3	4	5	6	7	8	Final
France (Jeanneret)	2	2	2	1	0	2	X	X	9
Belarus (Pavlyuchik) 🔨	0	0	0	0	2	0	X	X	2

Sheet D	1	2	3	4	5	6	7	8	Final
Slovenia (Kremzar)	0	0	1	0	0	0	1	X	2
Slovakia (Kajanova) 🔨	2	1	0	1	2	0	0	X	6

Sheet E	1	2	3	4	5	6	7	8	Final
Croatia (Penava)	0	2	1	0	0	0	2	X	5
Spain (Garcia) 🔨	1	0	0	3	1	3	0	X	8

==== Draw 16 ====
Friday, October 16, 16:00

Sheet B	1	2	3	4	5	6	7	8	Final
Slovenia (Kremzar)	0	0	2	0	1	0	0	X	3
Spain (Garcia) 🔨	2	2	0	1	0	1	0	X	6

Sheet C	1	2	3	4	5	6	7	8	Final
Croatia (Penava)	1	0	0	0	0	1	X	X	2
Slovakia (Kajanova) 🔨	0	2	2	3	6	0	X	X	13

Sheet D	1	2	3	4	5	6	7	8	Final
France (Jeanneret) 🔨	2	0	0	0	2	0	0	X	4
Ireland (Fyfe)	0	1	3	2	0	1	2	X	9

Sheet E	1	2	3	4	5	6	7	8	Final
Romania (Colceriu)	1	1	0	1	0	0	1	X	4
Belarus (Pavlyuchik) 🔨	0	0	4	0	2	2	0	X	8

==== Tiebreaker ====
Friday, October 16, 20:00

Sheet F	1	2	3	4	5	6	7	8	Final
Ireland (Fyfe) 🔨	3	1	0	3	3	1	X	X	11
Spain (Garcia)	0	0	1	0	0	0	X	X	1

=== Playoffs ===
Second Place Game
2	Slovakia	7
4	Ireland	6

Semifinals
1	France	6
2	Slovakia	4
3	Belarus	5
4	Ireland	7

==== 1 vs. 2 ====
Saturday, October 17, 10:00

Sheet D	1	2	3	4	5	6	7	8	Final
France (Jeanneret) 🔨	0	0	1	0	2	0	2	1	6
Slovakia (Kajanova)	1	0	0	1	0	2	0	0	4

France advance to Group B competitions.
Slovakia advance to Second Place Game.

==== 3 vs. 4 ====
Saturday, October 17, 10:00

Sheet E	1	2	3	4	5	6	7	8	Final
Belarus (Pavlyuchik) 🔨	0	1	0	1	0	0	3	0	5
Ireland (Fyfe)	1	0	2	0	1	2	0	1	7

Ireland advance to Second Place Game.

==== Second Place Game ====
Saturday, October 17, 15:00

Sheet C	1	2	3	4	5	6	7	8	9	Final
Slovakia (Kajanova) 🔨	0	1	0	1	0	3	1	0	1	7
Ireland (Fyfe)	0	0	1	0	4	0	0	1	0	6

Slovakia advance to Group B competitions.
