= Finnish Mixed Doubles Curling Championship =

The Finnish Mixed Doubles Curling Championship is the national championship of mixed doubles curling in Finland. It has been held annually since 2008.

== List of champions and medallists ==
Year	Champion	Runner-up	Bronze	Finish at Worlds
2008	Jussi Uusipaavalniemi, Anne Malmi	Tomi Rantamäki, Kirsi Nykänen	Aku Kauste, Oona Kauste	2nd place, silver medalist(s)
2009	Jussi Uusipaavalniemi, Jaana Hämäläinen	Jukka Lehtonen, Laura Kitti	Aku Kauste, Oona Kauste	5
2010	Lare Norri, Peter Landgrén	Aku Kauste, Oona Kauste	Marjo Hippi, Jukka Lehtonen	17
2011	Katja Kiiskinen, Kalle Kiiskinen	Markku Uusipaavalniemi, Eszter Juhász	Marjo Hippi, Juha Pääjärvi	9
2012	Jussi Uusipaavalniemi, Jaana Hämäläinen	Jani Sullanmaa, Jenni Sullanmaa	Katja Kiiskinen, Kalle Kiiskinen coach: Paavo Kuosmanen	14
2013	Katja Kiiskinen, Kalle Kiiskinen	Jani Sullanmaa, Jenni Sullanmaa	Aku Kauste, Oona Kauste	18
2014	Markku Uusipaavalniemi, Eszter Juhász	Tomi Rantamäki, Anne Malmi	Sanna Piilo, Perttu Piilo	14
2015	Katja Kiiskinen, Kalle Kiiskinen	Tomi Rantamäki, Anne Malmi	Milja Hellsten, Jere Sullanmaa	14
2016	Tomi Rantamäki, Oona Kauste	Markku Uusipaavalniemi, Eszter Juhász	Sanna Piilo, Perttu Piilo	7
2017	Tomi Rantamäki, Oona Kauste	Markku Uusipaavalniemi, Eszter Juhász	Miia Turto, Jari Turto	7
2018	Miia Turto, Jari Turto	Markku Uusipaavalniemi, Eszter Juhász	Lotta Immonen, Iikko Säntti	13
2019	Aku Kauste, Oona Kauste	Markku Uusipaavalniemi, Eszter Juhász	Miia Turto, Jari Turto	9
2020	Aku Kauste, Oona Kauste	Markku Uusipaavalniemi, Eszter Juhász	Miia Turto, Jari Turto	Not held
2021	Aku Kauste, Oona Kauste	Hermanni Hakanpää, Elina Virtaala	Miia Turto, Jari Turto	17
2022	Lotta Immonen, Markus Sipilä	Susanna Säntti, Iikko Säntti	Elina Virtaala, Ville Forsström	17
2025	Tiina Suuripää / Tomi Rantamäki	Lotta Immonen / Markus Sipilä	Kalle Kiiskinen / Mariia Kiiskinen	10
2026	Lotta Immonen / Markus Sipilä	Susanna Säntti / Iikko Säntti	Jenni Merovuo / Ville Forsström	

== See also ==
- Finnish Men's Curling Championship
- Finnish Women's Curling Championship
- Finnish Mixed Curling Championship
- Finnish Junior Curling Championships
- Finnish Wheelchair Curling Championship
- Finnish Wheelchair Mixed Doubles Curling Championship
