= Elina Virtaala =

Finnish curler and coach

- Curler ♀
- Born: 29 November 1965 (age 60)

Team
- Curling club: Joensuun Curling Ry

Curling career
- Member Association: Finland
- World Mixed Doubles Championship: 1 (2019)
- European Championship: 2 (2018, 2019)
- Other appearances: World Senior Championships: 3 (2017, 2018, 2019)
Medal record
Curling
Finnish Women's Championship
Silver medal – second place	2016
Silver medal – second place	2018
Silver medal – second place	2019
Bronze medal – third place	2014
Bronze medal – third place	2015
Bronze medal – third place	2017
Bronze medal – third place	2020 Lohja

Elina Virtaala (born 29 November 1965) is a Finnish curler and curling coach.

== Teams ==
=== Women's ===
Season	Skip	Third	Second	Lead	Alternate	Coach	Events
2013–14	Anne Malmi	Sari Auvinen	Tuire Autio	Johanna Virsu	Elina Virtaala		FWCC 2014 (bronze)
2014–15	Anne Malmi	Elina Virtaala	Tuire Autio	Sari Auvinen	Johanna Virsu, Kati Tahvanainen	Anne Malmi	FWCC 2015 (bronze)
2015–16	Mari Wickström	Janina Lindström	Jenny Scott	Ulla Sten	Elina Virtaala	Peter Lindström	FWCC 2016 (silver)
2016–17	Mari Hansen	Janina Lindström	Riikka Louhivuori	Moa Norell	Ulla Sten, Elina Virtaala	Sunkan Sundqvist	FWCC 2017 (bronze)
2016–17	Mari Hansen	Janina Lindström	Riikka Louhivuori	Elina Virtaala		Sunkan Sundqvist	FSCC 2017 (gold)
2016–17	Elina Virtaala (fourth)	Mari Hansen (skip)	Janina Lindström	Riikka Louhivuori	Kirsti Kauste	Matti Virtaala	WSCC 2017 (9th)
2017–18	Mari Hansen	Janina Lindström	Riikka Louhivuori	Ulla Sten	Elina Virtaala		FWCC 2018 (silver)
2017–18	Mari Hansen	Janina Lindström	Riikka Louhivuori	Elina Virtaala			FSCC 2018 (gold)
2017–18	Elina Virtaala (fourth)	Mari Hansen (skip)	Janina Lindström	Riikka Louhivuori	Kirsti Kauste	Peter Lindström	WSCC 2018 (5th)
2018–19	Oona Kauste	Eszter Juhász	Maija Salmiovirta	Lotta Immonen	Elina Virtaala	Aku Kauste	ECC 2018 (9th)
2018–19	Elina Virtaala	Mari Hansen	Janina Lindström	Ulla Sten	Ulla Österlund		FWCC 2019 (silver)
2018–19	Elina Virtaala	Laura Kitti	Janina Lindström	Riikka Louhivuori	Ulla Österlund		FSCC 2019 (gold)
2018–19	Mari Hansen	Janina Lindström	Laura Kitti	Riikka Louhivuori	Elina Virtaala	Matti Virtaala	WSCC 2019 (8th)
2019–20	Elina Virtaala	Miia Turto	Janina Lindström	Tuuli Rissanen		Katja Kiiskinen	ECC 2019 (16th)
2019–20	Elina Virtaala	Janina Lindström	Riikka Louhivuori	Tiina Suuripää			FWCC 2020 (bronze)
2019–20	Elina Virtaala	Janina Lindström	Riikka Louhivuori	Minna Sallinen	Tiina Suuripää		FSCC 2020 (silver)

=== Mixed ===
Season	Skip	Third	Second	Lead	Events
2009–10	Kai Pahl	Elina Virtaala	Matti Virtaala	Helena Pahl	FMxCC 2010 (7th)
2011–12	Kari Keränen	Jaakko Lemettinen	Minna Soikkeli	Elina Virtaala	FMxCC 2012 (5th)
2014–15	Jussi Uusipaavalniemi	Johanna Pyyhtiä	Paavo Kuosmanen	Elina Virtaala	FMxCC 2015 (5th)
2017–18	Mikko Saastamoinen	Ville Kärkkäinen	Ulla Sten	Elina Virtaala	FMxCC 2018 (silver)
2019–20	Hermanni Hakanpää	Eila Ilmakangas	Valtteri Kinnunen	Elina Virtaala	FMxCC 2020 (bronze)

=== Mixed doubles ===
Season	Male	Female	Coach	Events
2010–11	Matti Virtaala	Elina Virtaala		FMDCC 2011 (7th)
2011–12	Matti Virtaala	Elina Virtaala		FMDCC 2012 (9th)
2012–13	Veli-Pekka Vähäla	Elina Virtaala		FMDCC 2013 (12th)
2018–19	Tomi Rantamäki	Elina Virtaala	Iikko Saentti (WMDCC)	FMDCC 2019 (4th); WMDCC 2019 (9th)

== Record as a coach of national teams ==
Year	Tournament, event	National team	Place
2013	2013 World Senior Curling Championships	Finland (senior men)	8
2015	2015 World Senior Curling Championships	Finland (senior men)	11
2016	2016 World Senior Curling Championships	Finland (senior men)	11
