= Anne Malmi =

Finnish female curler and coach

- Curler ♀
- Born: 21 December 1965 (age 60)

Team
- Curling club: Hyvinkään Curling Ry, Hyvinkää

Curling career
- Member Association: Finland
- World Championship: 6 (1988, 1994, 1996, 1997, 1998, 1999)
- World Mixed Doubles Championship: 1 (2008)
- European Championship: 10 (1983, 1987, 1995, 1996, 1997, 1998, 2006, 2007, 2012, 2016)
- Other appearances: World Mixed Curling Championship: 1 (2015), European Mixed Curling Championship: 4 (2006, 2007, 2013, 2014)
Medal record
Curling
World Mixed Doubles Championship
Silver medal – second place	2008 Vierumäki
Finnish Women's Championship
Gold medal – first place	1995
Gold medal – first place	1996
Gold medal – first place	1997
Gold medal – first place	1998
Gold medal – first place	1999
Gold medal – first place	2006
Gold medal – first place	2007
Gold medal – first place	2008
Gold medal – first place	2013
Gold medal – first place	2016
Silver medal – second place	2001
Silver medal – second place	2002
Silver medal – second place	2003
Silver medal – second place	2004
Silver medal – second place	2012
Silver medal – second place	2017
Bronze medal – third place	2014
Bronze medal – third place	2015

Anne Malmi (born 21 December 1965 as Anne Eerikäinen) is a Finnish female curler and curling coach.

She started curling in 1983 at the age of 18.

She has one of the longest women's international curling careers at a high international level - she first performed in top-level tournaments at the 1983 European Championships, and the first women's world championship in which she participated was in 1988.

Malmi is one of the most successful female curlers in Finland, in various national championships (among women, among mixed teams and mixed doubles) she won a large number of titles and prizes.

== Teams ==
=== Women's ===
Season	Skip	Third	Second	Lead	Alternate	Coach	Events
1983—84	Anne Eerikäinen	Sirpa Piiroinen	Terhi Aro	Marita Ripatti			ECC 1983 (13th)
1984—85	Anne Eerikäinen	Heidi Koskiheimo	Marita Ripatti	Terhi Aro	Sirpa Piiroinen		EJCC 1985 (6th)
1986—87	Anne Eerikäinen	Mari Lundén	Hannele Saarto	Terhi Liukkonen			EJCC 1987 (6th)
1987—88	Anne Eerikäinen	Mari Lundén	Tytti Haapasaari	Terhi Liukkonen			ECC 1987 (6th); WWCC 1988 (10th)
1993—94	Jaana Jokela	Nina Pöllänen	Terhi Aro	Laura Franssila	Anne Eerikäinen		WWCC 1994 (6th)
1994—95	Jaana Jokela	Nina Pöllänen	Anne Eerikäinen	Laura Franssila	Tiina Tenkanen		FWCC 1995 (gold)
1995—96	Jaana Jokela	Anne Eerikäinen	Nina Pöllänen	Laura Franssila	Matti Orrainen (ECC); Tiina Tenkanen (FWCC)		ECC 1995 (6th); FWCC 1996 (gold)
1995—96	Jaana Jokela	Nina Pöllänen	Anne Eerikäinen	Laura Franssila	Tiina Tenkanen		WWCC 1996 (10th)
1996—97	Jaana Jokela	Anne Eerikäinen	Laura Franssila	Johanna Kartano	Tiina Kautonen		ECC 1996 (6th)
1996—97	Jaana Jokela	Anne Eerikäinen	Nina Pöllänen	Laura Franssila	Tiina Kautonen		FWCC 1997 (gold)
1996—97	Anne Eerikäinen (fourth)	Jaana Jokela (skip)	Nina Pöllänen	Laura Franssila	Tiina Kautonen		WWCC 1997 (8th)
1997—98	Jaana Jokela	Anne Eerikäinen	Nina Pöllänen	Laura Franssila	Tiina Kautonen		FWCC 1998 (gold)
1997—98	Anne Eerikäinen (fourth)	Jaana Jokela (skip)	Nina Pöllänen	Laura Franssila	Tiina Kautonen	Gail McMillan	ECC 1997 (4th); WWCC 1998 (10th)
1998—99	Anne Eerikäinen	Jaana Jokela	Jaana Hämäläinen	Tiina Kautonen		Anders Hed‚n	ECC 1998 (7th)
1998—99	Anne Eerikäinen	Jaana Häkkinen	Jaana Hämäläinen	Laura Franssila	Tiina Kautonen		FWCC 1999 (gold)
1998—99	Anne Eerikäinen	Tiina Kautonen	Jaana Hämäläinen	Jaana Jokela	Minna Malinen		WWCC 1999 (8th)
2000—01	Anne Malmi	?	?	?			FWCC 2001 (silver)
2001—02	Anne Malmi	?	?	?			FWCC 2002 (silver)
2002—03	Anne Malmi	Jaana Häkkinen	Sari Auvinen	Johanna Pyyhtiä	Hannele Liesmäki		FWCC 2003 (silver)
2003—04	Anne Malmi	Jaana Häkkinen	?	?			FWCC 2004 (silver)
2005—06	Anne Malmi	Sari Auvinen	Sari Miettinen	Johanna Pyyhtiä			FWCC 2006 (gold)
2006—07	Anne Malmi	Mimmi Koivula	Sari Auvinen	Katri Määttä	Tuire Autio	Jaana Jokela	ECC 2006 (12th)
2006—07	Anne Malmi	Johanna Pyyhtiä	Katri Määttä	Sari Auvinen	Sari Miettinen		FWCC 2007 (gold)
2007—08	Anne Malmi	Sari Auvinen	Katri Määttä	Tuire Autio	Katja Kiiskinen	Jaana Jokela	ECC 2007 (10th)
2007—08	Anne Malmi	Tuire Autio	Katri Määttä	Sari Auvinen	Tytti Haapasaari, Sari Miettinen	Jaana Häkkinen	FWCC 2008 (gold)
2010—11	Anne Malmi	Sari Auvinen	Laura Kitti	Paula Lehtomäki	Kristiina Nokelainen, Johanna Pyyhtiä	Sari Miettinen	FWCC 2011 (4th)
2011—12	Anne Malmi	Laura Vallinkivi	Jenni Räsänen	Jenni Sullanmaa	Tuire Autio, Sari Auvinen	Anne Malmi	FWCC 2012 (silver)
2012—13	Anne Malmi	Oona Kauste	Heidi Hossi	Marjo Hippi	Tiina Suuripää	Sanna Puustinen, Tomi Rantamäki	ECC 2012 (10th)
2012—13	Anne Malmi	Sanna Piilo	Heidi Hossi	Marjo Hippi	Sari Auvinen, Oona Kauste		FWCC 2013 (gold)
2013—14	Anne Malmi	Sari Auvinen	Tuire Autio	Johanna Virsu	Elina Virtaala		FWCC 2014 (bronze)
2014—15	Anne Malmi	Elina Virtaala	Tuire Autio	Sari Auvinen	Johanna Virsu, Kati Tahvanainen	Anne Malmi	FWCC 2015 (bronze)
2015—16	Anne Malmi	Tiina Suuripää	Tuire Autio	Sari Auvinen	Salla Soini	Anne Malmi	FWCC 2016 (gold)
2016—17	Anne Malmi	Eszter Juhász	Tiina Suuripää	Lotta Immonen	Tuire Autio	Olavi Malmi	ECC 2016 (10th)
2016—17	Anne Malmi	Tuire Autio	Sari Auvinen	Lotta Immonen	Noora Suuripää, Tiina Suuripää		FWCC 2017 (silver)

=== Mixed ===
Season	Skip	Third	Second	Lead	Alternate	Coach	Events
2005	Jussi Uusipaavalniemi	Anne Malmi	Petri Tsutsunen	Johanna Pyyhtiä			FMxCC 2005 (bronze)
2006	Jussi Uusipaavalniemi	Anne Malmi	Petri Tsutsunen	Johanna Pyyhtiä	Olavi Malmi (EMxCC)		FMxCC 2006 (gold); EMxCC 2006 (6th)
2007	Jussi Uusipaavalniemi	Johanna Pyyhtiä	Petri Tsutsunen	Anne Malmi	Teemu Salo (FMxCC); Olavi Malmi (EMxCC)		FMxCC 2007 (gold); EMxCC 2007 (10th)
2008	Anne Malmi	Olavi Malmi	Riku Harjula	Sari Auvinen	Tytti Haapasaari, Toni Sepperi		FMxCC 2008 (silver)
2009	Anne Malmi	Olavi Malmi	Sari Auvinen	Leo Mäkelä	Tytti Haapasaari, Niklas Malmi		FMxCC 2009 (bronze)
2010	Anne Malmi	Niklas Malmi	Sari Auvinen	Olavi Malmi	Tytti Haapasaari, Asko Korhonen	Anne Malmi	FMxCC 2010 (7th)
2012—13	Tomi Rantamäki	Pekka Peura	Anne Malmi	Tiina Suuripää			FMxCC 2013 (gold)
2013—14	Tomi Rantamäki	Anne Malmi	Pekka Peura	Tiina Suuripää		Olavi Malmi (EMxCC)	EMxCC 2013 (4th); FMxCC 2014 (gold)
2014—15	Tomi Rantamäki	Anne Malmi	Pekka Peura (EMxCC); Iikko Säntti (FMxCC)	Tiina Suuripää		Olavi Malmi (EMxCC)	EMxCC 2014 (5th); FMxCC 2015 (gold)
2015—16	Tomi Rantamäki	Anne Malmi	Iikko Säntti	Tiina Suuripää		Olavi Malmi	WMxCC 2015 (13th)
2015—16	Anne Malmi	Niklas Malmi	Tiina Suuripää	Iikko Säntti			FMxCC 2016 (silver)

=== Mixed doubles ===
Season	Male	Female	Events
2007—08	Jussi Uusipaavalniemi	Anne Malmi	FMDCC 2008 (gold); WMDCC 2008 (silver)
2011—12	Niklas Malmi	Anne Malmi	FMDCC 2012 (4th)
2012—13	Olavi Malmi	Anne Malmi	FMDCC 2013 (9th)
2013—14	Tomi Rantamäki	Anne Malmi	FMDCC 2014 (silver)
2014—15	Tomi Rantamäki	Anne Malmi	FMDCC 2015 (silver)

== Record as a coach of national teams ==
Year	Tournament, event	National team	Place
2014	2014 European Junior Curling Challenge	Slovenia (junior men)	14
2015	2015 World Wheelchair Curling Championship	Finland (wheelchair)	3rd place, bronze medalist(s)
