= 2018 European Curling Championships =

2018 Le Gruyère AOP European Curling Championships
- Host city: Tallinn, Estonia
- Arena: Tondiraba Ice Hall
- Dates: November 16–24
- Men's winner: Scotland
- Curling club: Gogar Park CC, Edinburgh
- Skip: Bruce Mouat
- Third: Grant Hardie
- Second: Bobby Lammie
- Lead: Hammy McMillan Jr.
- Alternate: Ross Whyte
- Coach: Alan Hannah
- Finalist: Sweden (Edin)
- Women's winner: Sweden
- Curling club: Sundbybergs CK, Sundbyberg
- Skip: Anna Hasselborg
- Third: Sara McManus
- Second: Agnes Knochenhauer
- Lead: Sofia Mabergs
- Alternate: Johanna Heldin
- Coach: Wayne Middaugh
- Finalist: Switzerland (Tirinzoni)

The 2018 Le Gruyère AOP European Curling Championships were held from November 16 to 24 in Tallinn, Estonia. The C Division competitions were held in April in Copenhagen, Denmark.

The top seven men's teams will qualify for the 2019 World Men's Curling Championship. Additionally, the top two teams in the B division and the top two teams in the A division not already qualified for the World Men's Curling Championship will qualify for the 2019 World Qualification Event, a further chance to qualify for the Worlds.

The top six women's teams, not including the hosts, Denmark, who automatically qualify, will qualify for the 2019 World Women's Curling Championship. Additionally, the top two teams in the B division and the top two teams in the A division not already qualified for the World Women's Curling Championship will qualify for the 2019 World Qualification Event, a further chance to qualify for the Worlds.

== Men ==
=== A Division ===
==== Teams ====
A Division Teams

Finland	Germany	Italy	Netherlands	Norway
Skip: Wille Mäkelä; Third: Kalle Kiiskinen; Second: Teemu Salo; Lead: Paavo Kuosmanen; Alternate: Juha Pekaristo	Skip: Marc Muskatewitz; Third: Sixten Totzek; Second: Daniel Neuner; Lead: Ryan Sherrard; Alternate: Sebastian Schweizer	Skip: Joël Retornaz; Third: Amos Mosaner; Second: Sebastiano Arman; Lead: Simone Gonin; Alternate: Fabio Ribotta	Fourth: Wouter Gösgens; Skip: Jaap van Dorp; Second: Laurens Hoekman; Lead: Carlo Glasbergen; Alternate: Alexander Magan	Skip: Steffen Walstad; Third: Markus Høiberg; Second: Magnus Nedregotten; Lead: Magnus Vågberg; Alternate: Steffen Mellemseter
Poland	Russia	Scotland	Switzerland	Sweden
Skip: Bartosz Dzikowski; Third: Jakub Głowania; Second: Jeremi Telak; Lead: Michał Kozioł; Alternate: Tomasz Zioło	Skip: Mikhail Vaskov; Third: Alexey Tuzov; Second: Petr Kuznetsov; Lead: Anton Kalalb; Alternate: Alexey Kulikov	Skip: Bruce Mouat; Third: Grant Hardie; Second: Bobby Lammie; Lead: Hammy McMillan Jr. Alternate: Ross Whyte	Fourth: Benoît Schwarz; Third: Sven Michel; Skip: Peter de Cruz; Lead: Valentin Tanner; Alternate: Simon Gempeler	Skip: Niklas Edin; Third: Oskar Eriksson; Second: Rasmus Wranå; Lead: Christoffer Sundgren; Alternate: Daniel Magnusson

==== Round-robin standings ====
Final round-robin standings

Key
Teams to Playoffs and qualified for World Championship
Qualified for World Championship
Qualified for World Qualification Event
Team Relegated to 2019 Group B but qualified for World Qualification Event
Team Relegated to 2019 Group B

Country	Skip	W	L	PF	PA	Ends Won	Ends Lost	Blank Ends	Stolen Ends	Shot Pct.
Sweden	Niklas Edin	9	0	74	35	39	25	15	12	85%
Scotland	Bruce Mouat	7	2	75	48	46	29	6	18	84%
Italy	Joël Retornaz	6	3	66	56	37	38	7	10	82%
Germany	Marc Muskatewitz	5	4	50	55	36	31	11	11	74%
Norway	Steffen Walstad	5	4	60	49	38	35	13	8	83%
Switzerland	Peter de Cruz	5	4	66	51	39	34	5	10	83%
Russia	Mikhail Vaskov	3	6	50	63	34	39	12	7	76%
Netherlands	Jaap van Dorp	2	7	53	60	33	38	11	8	80%
Finland	Wille Mäkelä	2	7	37	76	25	44	13	3	72%
Poland	Bartosz Dzikowski	1	8	34	72	24	38	12	3	68%

==== Round-robin results ====
===== Draw 1 =====
Saturday, November 17, 09:00

Sheet A	1	2	3	4	5	6	7	8	9	10	Final
Sweden (Edin)	2	0	0	0	0	0	2	1	0	2	7
Switzerland (de Cruz)	0	2	2	0	0	1	0	0	1	0	6

Sheet B	1	2	3	4	5	6	7	8	9	10	Final
Scotland (Mouat)	0	1	0	1	0	3	0	2	0	1	8
Norway (Walstad)	0	0	1	0	2	0	2	0	2	0	7

Sheet C	1	2	3	4	5	6	7	8	9	10	Final
Germany (Muskatewitz)	1	0	1	0	1	1	0	4	1	1	10
Russia (Vaskov)	0	2	0	2	0	0	2	0	0	0	6

Sheet D	1	2	3	4	5	6	7	8	9	10	Final
Netherlands (van Dorp)	0	0	1	0	1	0	3	0	1	X	6
Italy (Retornaz)	1	1	0	4	0	2	0	2	0	X	10

Sheet E	1	2	3	4	5	6	7	8	9	10	11	Final
Finland (Mäkelä)	0	0	0	0	0	3	0	1	0	1	1	6
Poland (Dzikowski)	0	0	0	0	0	0	3	0	2	0	0	5

===== Draw 3 =====
Saturday, November 17, 20:00

Sheet A	1	2	3	4	5	6	7	8	9	10	Final
Norway (Walstad)	0	3	0	1	0	2	0	0	0	2	8
Netherlands (van Dorp)	0	0	1	0	1	0	2	1	2	0	7

Sheet B	1	2	3	4	5	6	7	8	9	10	11	Final
Switzerland (de Cruz)	0	0	0	3	0	0	0	1	0	2	0	6
Italy (Retornaz)	0	0	2	0	1	1	1	0	1	0	1	7

Sheet C	1	2	3	4	5	6	7	8	9	10	Final
Finland (Mäkelä)	0	1	0	0	0	0	0	X	X	X	1
Sweden (Edin)	0	0	3	2	1	0	3	X	X	X	9

Sheet D	1	2	3	4	5	6	7	8	9	10	Final
Poland (Dzikowski)	0	2	0	2	0	0	1	2	1	X	8
Russia (Vaskov)	1	0	1	0	2	0	0	0	0	X	4

Sheet E	1	2	3	4	5	6	7	8	9	10	Final
Scotland (Mouat)	1	0	2	3	1	0	0	1	X	X	8
Germany (Muskatewitz)	0	1	0	0	0	2	0	0	X	X	3

===== Draw 5 =====
Sunday, November 18, 14:00

Sheet A	1	2	3	4	5	6	7	8	9	10	Final
Russia (Vaskov)	0	1	0	3	1	0	2	1	0	0	8
Scotland (Mouat)	1	0	2	0	0	2	0	0	1	1	7

Sheet B	1	2	3	4	5	6	7	8	9	10	Final
Sweden (Edin)	3	1	1	3	0	3	X	X	X	X	11
Poland (Dzikowski)	0	0	0	0	2	0	X	X	X	X	2

Sheet C	1	2	3	4	5	6	7	8	9	10	Final
Switzerland (de Cruz)	1	0	5	2	1	0	X	X	X	X	9
Netherlands (van Dorp)	0	1	0	0	0	2	X	X	X	X	3

Sheet D	1	2	3	4	5	6	7	8	9	10	Final
Germany (Muskatewitz)	0	1	0	1	1	1	0	1	0	2	7
Finland (Mäkelä)	0	0	2	0	0	0	0	0	1	0	3

Sheet E	1	2	3	4	5	6	7	8	9	10	Final
Norway (Walstad)	1	0	1	0	1	1	0	1	0	0	5
Italy (Retornaz)	0	1	0	1	0	0	1	0	3	1	7

===== Draw 7 =====
Monday, November 19, 08:00

Sheet A	1	2	3	4	5	6	7	8	9	10	Final
Italy (Retornaz)	3	0	3	0	0	1	2	2	X	X	11
Finland (Mäkelä)	0	1	0	2	1	0	0	0	X	X	4

Sheet B	1	2	3	4	5	6	7	8	9	10	Final
Germany (Muskatewitz)	0	0	1	0	1	0	2	1	0	1	6
Netherlands (van Dorp)	0	0	0	3	0	1	0	0	1	0	5

Sheet C	1	2	3	4	5	6	7	8	9	10	Final
Poland (Dzikowski)	0	1	0	1	0	0	1	0	X	X	3
Norway (Walstad)	2	0	1	0	3	0	0	3	X	X	9

Sheet D	1	2	3	4	5	6	7	8	9	10	Final
Russia (Vaskov)	0	0	1	0	1	0	0	0	1	0	3
Sweden (Edin)	0	1	0	1	0	1	0	0	0	2	5

Sheet E	1	2	3	4	5	6	7	8	9	10	Final
Switzerland (de Cruz)	0	1	0	1	0	1	0	1	0	X	4
Scotland (Mouat)	1	0	2	0	2	0	1	0	2	X	8

===== Draw 9 =====
Monday, November 19, 16:00

Sheet A	1	2	3	4	5	6	7	8	9	10	Final
Germany (Muskatewitz)	0	0	0	1	0	2	0	1	0	X	4
Norway (Walstad)	0	0	0	0	1	0	3	0	3	X	7

Sheet B	1	2	3	4	5	6	7	8	9	10	Final
Finland (Mäkelä)	1	0	2	0	3	0	1	0	0	0	7
Switzerland (de Cruz)	0	2	0	2	0	2	0	1	1	1	9

Sheet C	1	2	3	4	5	6	7	8	9	10	Final
Sweden (Edin)	2	0	2	0	1	1	0	0	5	X	11
Italy (Retornaz)	0	2	0	1	0	0	1	0	0	X	4

Sheet D	1	2	3	4	5	6	7	8	9	10	Final
Scotland (Mouat)	1	1	1	0	2	6	X	X	X	X	11
Poland (Dzikowski)	0	0	0	2	0	0	X	X	X	X	2

Sheet E	1	2	3	4	5	6	7	8	9	10	Final
Netherlands (van Dorp)	0	0	0	1	0	0	0	1	0	0	2
Russia (Vaskov)	1	0	0	0	1	0	0	0	2	1	5

===== Draw 11 =====
Tuesday, November 20, 09:00

Sheet A	1	2	3	4	5	6	7	8	9	10	11	Final
Finland (Mäkelä)	0	0	0	1	0	2	0	3	0	1	1	8
Russia (Vaskov)	0	2	1	0	1	0	2	0	1	0	0	7

Sheet B	1	2	3	4	5	6	7	8	9	10	Final
Norway (Walstad)	0	0	2	0	0	0	1	0	0	1	4
Sweden (Edin)	2	1	0	0	1	0	0	0	1	0	5

Sheet C	1	2	3	4	5	6	7	8	9	10	Final
Netherlands (van Dorp)	0	1	1	0	3	0	0	0	0	X	5
Scotland (Mouat)	3	0	0	1	0	2	1	1	0	X	8

Sheet D	1	2	3	4	5	6	7	8	9	10	Final
Italy (Retornaz)	0	3	3	0	3	0	X	X	X	X	9
Germany (Muskatewitz)	1	0	0	1	0	1	X	X	X	X	3

Sheet E	1	2	3	4	5	6	7	8	9	10	Final
Poland (Dzikowski)	0	1	0	1	0	1	0	X	X	X	3
Switzerland (de Cruz)	2	0	3	0	2	0	2	X	X	X	9

===== Draw 13 =====
Tuesday, November 20, 19:00

Sheet A	1	2	3	4	5	6	7	8	9	10	11	Final
Scotland (Mouat)	0	0	1	0	2	1	0	1	1	0	1	7
Italy (Retornaz)	1	0	0	3	0	0	1	0	0	1	0	6

Sheet B	1	2	3	4	5	6	7	8	9	10	Final
Poland (Dzikowski)	0	0	1	0	0	0	1	0	2	X	4
Germany (Muskatewitz)	0	2	0	1	2	1	0	2	0	X	8

Sheet C	1	2	3	4	5	6	7	8	9	10	Final
Russia (Vaskov)	0	0	1	0	1	0	X	X	X	X	2
Switzerland (de Cruz)	3	2	0	3	0	2	X	X	X	X	10

Sheet D	1	2	3	4	5	6	7	8	9	10	Final
Finland (Mäkelä)	0	1	0	0	1	0	0	0	0	X	2
Norway (Walstad)	0	0	2	1	0	1	0	1	1	X	6

Sheet E	1	2	3	4	5	6	7	8	9	10	Final
Sweden (Edin)	0	0	1	0	2	0	3	0	1	2	9
Netherlands (van Dorp)	0	1	0	1	0	2	0	1	0	0	5

===== Draw 15 =====
Wednesday, November 21, 14:00

Sheet A	1	2	3	4	5	6	7	8	9	10	Final
Switzerland (de Cruz)	0	1	0	1	0	1	0	1	1	0	5
Germany (Muskatewitz)	0	0	2	0	1	0	1	0	0	3	7

Sheet B	1	2	3	4	5	6	7	8	9	10	Final
Netherlands (van Dorp)	2	0	1	0	2	1	2	4	X	X	12
Finland (Mäkelä)	0	1	0	1	0	0	0	0	X	X	2

Sheet C	1	2	3	4	5	6	7	8	9	10	Final
Italy (Retornaz)	0	3	0	0	1	1	0	0	1	X	6
Poland (Dzikowski)	0	0	1	0	0	0	2	1	0	X	4

Sheet D	1	2	3	4	5	6	7	8	9	10	Final
Sweden (Edin)	1	0	0	0	3	0	2	0	0	3	9
Scotland (Mouat)	0	0	1	1	0	4	0	1	1	0	8

Sheet E	1	2	3	4	5	6	7	8	9	10	Final
Russia (Vaskov)	0	0	2	0	1	0	0	2	0	0	5
Norway (Walstad)	0	1	0	1	0	2	0	0	2	1	7

===== Draw 17 =====
Thursday, November 22, 09:00

Sheet A	1	2	3	4	5	6	7	8	9	10	Final
Netherlands (van Dorp)	0	3	0	2	0	0	0	1	2	X	8
Poland (Dzikowski)	1	0	1	0	0	0	1	0	0	X	3

Sheet B	1	2	3	4	5	6	7	8	9	10	Final
Italy (Retornaz)	0	0	0	4	0	2	0	0	0	X	6
Russia (Vaskov)	1	1	3	0	1	0	0	3	1	X	10

Sheet C	1	2	3	4	5	6	7	8	9	10	Final
Scotland (Mouat)	2	1	2	0	0	2	0	3	X	X	10
Finland (Mäkelä)	0	0	0	0	3	0	1	0	X	X	4

Sheet D	1	2	3	4	5	6	7	8	9	10	Final
Norway (Walstad)	2	0	1	0	2	0	0	1	1	0	7
Switzerland (de Cruz)	0	1	0	2	0	2	2	0	0	1	8

Sheet E	1	2	3	4	5	6	7	8	9	10	Final
Germany (Muskatewitz)	0	0	0	2	0	0	0	X	X	X	2
Sweden (Edin)	2	3	2	0	0	0	1	X	X	X	8

==== Playoffs ====
Semi-finals
1	Sweden	6
4	Germany	3
2	Scotland	9
3	Italy	6

Gold medal game
1	Sweden	5
2	Scotland	9
Bronze medal game
3	Italy	8
4	Germany	6

===== Semi-finals =====
Thursday, November 22, 19:00

Sheet B	1	2	3	4	5	6	7	8	9	10	Final
Sweden (Edin)	0	1	1	0	2	0	2	0	0	X	6
Germany (Muskatewitz)	0	0	0	1	0	0	0	1	1	X	3

Player percentages
Sweden		Germany	
Christoffer Sundgren	88%	Ryan Sherrard	81%
Rasmus Wranå	98%	Daniel Neuner	75%
Oskar Eriksson	96%	Sixten Totzek	78%
Niklas Edin	92%	Marc Muskatewitz	76%
Total	94%	Total	78%

Sheet C	1	2	3	4	5	6	7	8	9	10	11	Final
Scotland (Mouat)	0	1	0	2	1	1	0	0	1	0	3	9
Italy (Retornaz)	1	0	2	0	0	0	0	1	0	2	0	6

Player percentages
Scotland		Italy	
Hammy McMillan Jr.	89%	Simone Gonin	90%
Bobby Lammie	89%	Sebastiano Arman	78%
Grant Hardie	92%	Amos Mosaner	82%
Bruce Mouat	84%	Joël Retornaz	78%
Total	89%	Total	82%

===== Bronze medal game =====
Friday, November 23, 19:00

Sheet D	1	2	3	4	5	6	7	8	9	10	Final
Italy (Retornaz)	2	0	1	0	0	2	2	0	0	1	8
Germany (Muskatewitz)	0	2	0	0	1	0	0	2	1	0	6

Player percentages
Italy		Germany	
Simone Gonin	95%	Ryan Sherrard	88%
Sebastiano Arman	83%	Daniel Neuner	74%
Amos Mosaner	85%	Sixten Totzek	80%
Joël Retornaz	78%	Marc Muskatewitz	72%
Total	85%	Total	79%

===== Gold medal game =====
Saturday, November 24, 15:00

Sheet D	1	2	3	4	5	6	7	8	9	10	Final
Sweden (Edin)	0	2	0	2	0	0	1	0	0	0	5
Scotland (Mouat)	1	0	1	0	0	2	0	2	0	3	9

Player percentages
Sweden		Scotland	
Christoffer Sundgren	83%	Hammy McMillan Jr.	95%
Rasmus Wranå	79%	Bobby Lammie	84%
Oskar Eriksson	71%	Grant Hardie	86%
Niklas Edin	65%	Bruce Mouat	90%
Total	75%	Total	89%

==== Player percentages ====
Round Robin only

Leads	%
(Italy) Simone Gonin	90
(Sweden) Christoffer Sundgren	90
(Switzerland) Valentin Tanner	89
(Norway) Magnus Vågberg	89
(Netherlands) Carlo Glasbergen	87
(Scotland) Hammy McMillan Jr.	87

Seconds	%
(Switzerland) Peter de Cruz	85
(Scotland) Bobby Lammie	85
(Norway) Magnus Nedregotten	84
(Sweden) Rasmus Wranå	84
(Italy) Sebastiano Arman	83

Thirds	%
(Sweden) Oskar Eriksson	86
(Scotland) Grant Hardie	85
(Norway) Markus Høiberg	82
(Netherlands) Jaap van Dorp	82
(Italy) Amos Mosaner	80

Skips/Fourths	%
(Sweden) Niklas Edin	82
(Scotland) Bruce Mouat	79
(Switzerland) Benoit Schwarz	79
(Netherlands) Wouter Gösgens	77
(Norway) Steffen Walstad	77

=== B Division ===
==== Round-robin standings ====
Key
Teams to Playoffs
Teams to Relegation Playoff

Pool A	Skip	W	L
Czech Republic	David Šik	7	0
Estonia	Harri Lill	5	2
Latvia	Ritvars Gulbis	5	2
Spain	Sergio Vez	5	2
Hungary	Zsolt Kiss	3	4
Slovakia	Pavol Pitoňák	2	5
Turkey	Uğurcan Karagöz	1	6
France	Eddy Mercier	0	7

Pool B	Skip	W	L
England	Andrew Reed	5	2
Belarus	Ilya Shalamitski	5	2
Denmark	Daniel Poulsen	4	3
Austria	Sebastian Wunderer	4	3
Lithuania	Tadas Vyskupaitis	3	4
Israel	Alex Pokras	3	4
Wales	Adrian Meikle	2	5
Slovenia	Lan Žagar	2	5

==== Relegation round ====
Relegation Semi-finals
A7	Turkey	10
B7	Wales	12
A8	France	8
B8	Slovenia	5

Relegation Finals
A7	Turkey	7
A8	France	5

Remain in B Division
Wales
Turkey
Relegated to C Division
France
Slovenia

==== Playoffs ====
Qualification games
A2	Estonia	7
B3	Denmark	8
B2	Belarus	5
A3	Latvia	7

Semi-finals
A1	Czech Republic	6
B3	Denmark	8
B1	England	9
A3	Latvia	6

Finals
B3	Denmark	10
B1	England	4
Bronze medal game
A1	Czech Republic	13
A3	Latvia	6

===== Qualification games =====
Friday, November 23, 08:30

Sheet F	1	2	3	4	5	6	7	8	9	10	Final
Estonia (Lill)	0	1	4	0	0	0	1	0	1	0	7
Denmark (Poulsen)	0	0	0	1	1	1	0	2	0	3	8

Sheet G	1	2	3	4	5	6	7	8	9	10	Final
Belarus (Shalamitski)	0	2	0	0	1	0	2	0	0	0	5
Latvia (Gulbis)	1	0	2	0	0	1	0	2	0	1	7

===== Semi-finals =====
Friday, November 23, 14:00

Sheet J	1	2	3	4	5	6	7	8	9	10	11	Final
Czech Republic (Šik)	0	0	1	0	0	1	1	0	1	2	0	6
Denmark (Poulsen)	0	1	0	1	2	0	0	2	0	0	2	8

Sheet K	1	2	3	4	5	6	7	8	9	10	Final
England (Reed)	0	0	2	0	1	0	2	3	0	1	9
Latvia (Gulbis)	0	0	0	3	0	2	0	0	1	0	6

===== Bronze medal game =====
Friday, November 23, 20:00

Sheet F	1	2	3	4	5	6	7	8	9	10	Final
Czech Republic (Šik)	6	2	1	0	0	3	1	0	X	X	13
Latvia (Gulbis)	0	0	0	2	3	0	0	1	X	X	6

===== Gold medal game =====
Friday, November 23, 20:00

Sheet H	1	2	3	4	5	6	7	8	9	10	Final
Denmark (Poulsen)	0	2	2	0	1	0	4	0	1	X	10
England (Reed)	1	0	0	1	0	1	0	1	0	X	4

=== C Division ===
==== Round-robin standings ====
Key
Teams to Playoffs

Country	Skip	W	L
Denmark	Mikkel Krause	7	0
Belarus	Ilya Shalamitski	5	2
Ireland	John Wilson	4	3
Bulgaria	Reto Seiler	4	3
Belgium	Stefan van Dijck	4	3
Romania	Allen Coliban	3	4
Croatia	Alberto Skendrovic	1	6
Andorra	Josep Garcia	0	7

==== Playoffs ====
Semi-finals
1	Denmark	9
2	Belarus	3
3	Ireland	12
4	Bulgaria	4

Second place game
2	Belarus	6
3	Ireland	5

Promoted to B Division
Denmark
Belarus
Remain in C Division
Ireland
Bulgaria

===== 1 vs. 2 =====
Sheet A	1	2	3	4	5	6	7	8	9	10	Final
Denmark (Krause)	4	2	0	0	1	0	1	1	X	X	9
Belarus (Shalamitski)	0	0	1	1	0	1	0	0	X	X	3

Winner advances to Group B competitions.
Loser advances to Second place game.

===== 3 vs. 4 =====
Sheet B	1	2	3	4	5	6	7	8	9	10	Final
Ireland (Wilson)	3	3	0	0	2	0	1	3	X	X	12
Bulgaria (Seiler)	0	0	2	1	0	1	0	0	X	X	4

Winner advances to Second place game.

===== Second place game =====
Sheet C	1	2	3	4	5	6	7	8	9	10	11	Final
Belarus (Shalamitski)	0	2	0	2	0	0	1	0	0	0	1	6
Ireland (Wilson)	0	0	1	0	0	1	0	0	1	2	0	5

Winner advances to Group B competitions.

== Women ==
=== A Division ===
==== Teams ====
A Division Teams

Czech Republic	Denmark	Finland	Germany	Italy
Skip: Anna Kubešková; Third: Alžběta Baudyšová; Second: Tereza Plíšková; Lead: Ežen Kolčevská; Alternate: Eliška Soukupová	Skip: Madeleine Dupont; Third: Denise Dupont; Second: Julie Høgh; Lead: Mathilde Halse; Alternate: Lina Knudsen	Skip: Oona Kauste; Third: Eszter Juhász; Second: Maija Salmiovirta; Lead: Lotta Immonen; Alternate: Elina Virtaala	Skip: Daniela Jentsch; Third: Emira Abbes; Second: Analena Jentsch; Lead: Klara-Hermine Fomm; Alternate: Lena Kapp	Skip: Veronica Zappone; Third: Stefania Constantini; Second: Angela Romei; Lead: Frederica Ghedina; Alternate: Elena Dami
Latvia	Russia	Scotland	Switzerland	Sweden
Skip: Iveta Staša-Šaršūne; Third: Santa Blumberga; Second: Ieva Krusta; Lead: Evelīna Barone; Alternate: Tīna Siliņa	Skip: Alina Kovaleva; Third: Anastasia Bryzgalova; Second: Galina Arsenkina; Lead: Ekaterina Kuzmina; Alternate: Uliana Vasilyeva	Skip: Eve Muirhead; Third: Jennifer Dodds; Second: Vicki Chalmers; Lead: Lauren Gray; Alternate: Vicky Wright	Fourth: Alina Pätz; Skip: Silvana Tirinzoni; Second: Esther Neuenschwander; Lead: Melanie Barbezat; Alternate: Marisa Winkelhausen	Skip: Anna Hasselborg; Third: Sara McManus; Second: Agnes Knochenhauer; Lead: Sofia Mabergs; Alternate: Johanna Heldin

==== Round-robin standings ====
Final round-robin standings

Key
Teams to Playoffs and qualified for World Championship
Qualified for World Championship
Qualified for World Qualification Event
Team Relegated to 2019 Group B but qualified for World Qualification Event
Team Relegated to 2019 Group B

Country	Skip	W	L	PF	PA	Ends Won	Ends Lost	Blank Ends	Stolen Ends	Shot Pct.
Switzerland	Silvana Tirinzoni	9	0	74	38	41	30	9	13	84%
Sweden	Anna Hasselborg	7	2	62	42	39	33	11	14	82%
Russia	Alina Kovaleva	6	3	78	55	45	37	4	11	81%
Germany	Daniela Jentsch	5	4	54	60	37	32	10	11	74%
Latvia	Iveta Staša-Šaršūne	4	5	61	69	39	38	7	10	70%
Scotland	Eve Muirhead	4	5	65	59	41	38	6	10	80%
Denmark	Madeleine Dupont	3	6	48	62	37	37	12	13	76%
Czech Republic	Anna Kubešková	3	6	52	62	31	44	9	5	75%
Finland	Oona Kauste	2	7	45	70	28	44	10	4	71%
Italy	Veronica Zappone	2	7	51	73	36	41	10	7	74%

==== Round-robin results ====
===== Draw 2 =====
Saturday, November 17, 15:00

Sheet A	1	2	3	4	5	6	7	8	9	10	Final
Denmark (Dupont)	1	0	1	0	1	0	1	0	0	X	4
Scotland (Muirhead)	0	3	0	2	0	0	0	1	1	X	7

Sheet B	1	2	3	4	5	6	7	8	9	10	Final
Italy (Zappone)	0	0	1	0	1	0	0	1	0	X	3
Switzerland (Tirinzoni)	0	4	0	2	0	1	0	0	1	X	8

Sheet C	1	2	3	4	5	6	7	8	9	10	Final
Russia (Kovaleva)	0	3	0	5	0	2	0	2	X	X	12
Germany (Jentsch)	1	0	1	0	2	0	1	0	X	X	5

Sheet D	1	2	3	4	5	6	7	8	9	10	Final
Czech Republic (Kubešková)	0	0	0	1	0	0	1	0	3	0	5
Sweden (Hasselborg)	0	0	1	0	2	1	0	1	0	1	6

Sheet E	1	2	3	4	5	6	7	8	9	10	Final
Latvia (Staša-Šaršūne)	1	0	1	0	0	3	0	2	0	1	8
Finland (Kauste)	0	3	0	0	5	0	1	0	2	0	11

===== Draw 4 =====
Sunday, November 18, 09:00

Sheet A	1	2	3	4	5	6	7	8	9	10	Final
Switzerland (Tirinzoni)	1	0	3	1	0	1	0	2	0	X	8
Czech Republic (Kubešková)	0	1	0	0	2	0	1	0	1	X	5

Sheet B	1	2	3	4	5	6	7	8	9	10	Final
Scotland (Muirhead)	1	0	0	0	1	0	1	1	0	X	4
Sweden (Hasselborg)	0	1	1	1	0	3	0	0	4	X	10

Sheet C	1	2	3	4	5	6	7	8	9	10	Final
Latvia (Staša-Šaršūne)	0	1	0	1	0	2	1	1	2	0	8
Denmark (Dupont)	1	0	2	0	2	0	0	0	0	1	6

Sheet D	1	2	3	4	5	6	7	8	9	10	Final
Finland (Kauste)	0	0	0	1	0	0	2	0	2	0	5
Germany (Jentsch)	0	0	1	0	1	2	0	1	0	2	7

Sheet E	1	2	3	4	5	6	7	8	9	10	Final
Italy (Zappone)	0	2	0	1	0	0	0	1	0	X	4
Russia (Kovaleva)	1	0	2	0	2	3	0	0	3	X	11

===== Draw 6 =====
Sunday, November 18, 19:00

Sheet A	1	2	3	4	5	6	7	8	9	10	11	Final
Germany (Jentsch)	0	1	1	0	0	1	0	2	0	2	1	8
Italy (Zappone)	1	0	0	2	0	0	1	0	3	0	0	7

Sheet B	1	2	3	4	5	6	7	8	9	10	Final
Denmark (Dupont)	0	0	1	1	0	0	2	1	0	1	6
Finland (Kauste)	1	0	0	0	0	1	0	0	3	0	5

Sheet C	1	2	3	4	5	6	7	8	9	10	Final
Scotland (Muirhead)	1	1	0	0	1	0	1	0	3	0	7
Czech Republic (Kubešková)	0	0	1	1	0	4	0	1	0	1	8

Sheet D	1	2	3	4	5	6	7	8	9	10	11	Final
Russia (Kovaleva)	0	0	1	0	2	0	1	0	2	1	1	8
Latvia (Staša-Šaršūne)	1	0	0	4	0	1	0	1	0	0	0	7

Sheet E	1	2	3	4	5	6	7	8	9	10	Final
Switzerland (Tirinzoni)	0	0	1	1	2	0	0	1	1	1	7
Sweden (Hasselborg)	2	1	0	0	0	1	0	0	0	0	4

===== Draw 8 =====
Monday, November 19, 12:00

Sheet A	1	2	3	4	5	6	7	8	9	10	Final
Sweden (Hasselborg)	0	0	2	0	0	4	1	0	0	X	7
Latvia (Staša-Šaršūne)	0	0	0	2	0	0	0	1	1	X	4

Sheet B	1	2	3	4	5	6	7	8	9	10	Final
Russia (Kovaleva)	0	1	3	1	0	2	0	1	1	0	9
Czech Republic (Kubešková)	2	0	0	0	5	0	2	0	0	1	10

Sheet C	1	2	3	4	5	6	7	8	9	10	Final
Finland (Kauste)	1	1	0	0	0	0	2	0	0	X	4
Switzerland (Tirinzoni)	0	0	1	1	1	0	0	4	3	X	10

Sheet D	1	2	3	4	5	6	7	8	9	10	Final
Germany (Jentsch)	0	1	0	1	1	0	0	1	0	2	6
Denmark (Dupont)	0	0	2	0	0	1	1	0	0	0	4

Sheet E	1	2	3	4	5	6	7	8	9	10	Final
Scotland (Muirhead)	2	0	2	0	0	1	0	2	0	2	9
Italy (Zappone)	0	1	0	2	1	0	2	0	1	0	7

===== Draw 10 =====
Monday, November 19, 20:00

Sheet A	1	2	3	4	5	6	7	8	9	10	Final
Russia (Kovaleva)	1	0	1	0	1	0	1	0	1	0	5
Switzerland (Tirinzoni)	0	1	0	1	0	1	0	2	0	1	6

Sheet B	1	2	3	4	5	6	7	8	9	10	Final
Latvia (Staša-Šaršūne)	5	0	0	1	0	1	0	1	1	0	9
Scotland (Muirhead)	0	2	1	0	2	0	1	0	0	1	7

Sheet C	1	2	3	4	5	6	7	8	9	10	Final
Denmark (Dupont)	0	0	1	1	0	2	1	0	1	0	6
Sweden (Hasselborg)	0	1	0	0	1	0	0	1	0	1	4

Sheet D	1	2	3	4	5	6	7	8	9	10	Final
Italy (Zappone)	0	0	2	0	0	1	1	0	1	0	5
Finland (Kauste)	0	1	0	0	1	0	0	2	0	2	6

Sheet E	1	2	3	4	5	6	7	8	9	10	Final
Czech Republic (Kubešková)	1	0	0	0	0	0	0	X	X	X	1
Germany (Jentsch)	0	0	3	1	2	2	1	X	X	X	9

===== Draw 12 =====
Tuesday, November 20, 14:00

Sheet A	1	2	3	4	5	6	7	8	9	10	Final
Latvia (Staša-Šaršūne)	2	0	0	1	1	0	0	1	0	X	5
Germany (Jentsch)	0	0	2	0	0	2	4	0	2	X	10

Sheet B	1	2	3	4	5	6	7	8	9	10	Final
Switzerland (Tirinzoni)	3	0	0	0	2	0	5	0	X	X	10
Denmark (Dupont)	0	1	3	0	0	1	0	1	X	X	6

Sheet C	1	2	3	4	5	6	7	8	9	10	Final
Czech Republic (Kubešková)	1	0	2	0	0	1	0	0	2	0	6
Italy (Zappone)	0	1	0	2	2	0	0	1	0	1	7

Sheet D	1	2	3	4	5	6	7	8	9	10	11	Final
Sweden (Hasselborg)	1	2	0	1	0	2	0	0	1	0	1	8
Russia (Kovaleva)	0	0	1	0	2	0	2	0	0	2	0	7

Sheet E	1	2	3	4	5	6	7	8	9	10	Final
Finland (Kauste)	1	0	0	2	0	0	2	0	X	X	5
Scotland (Muirhead)	0	1	2	0	3	1	0	3	X	X	10

===== Draw 14 =====
Wednesday, November 21, 09:00

Sheet A	1	2	3	4	5	6	7	8	9	10	Final
Italy (Zappone)	0	0	2	0	1	0	0	1	X	X	4
Sweden (Hasselborg)	2	2	0	2	0	0	2	0	X	X	8

Sheet B	1	2	3	4	5	6	7	8	9	10	Final
Finland (Kauste)	0	0	1	0	1	1	0	0	0	X	3
Russia (Kovaleva)	2	1	0	1	0	0	0	1	1	X	6

Sheet C	1	2	3	4	5	6	7	8	9	10	Final
Germany (Jentsch)	0	0	1	0	0	0	1	0	X	X	2
Scotland (Muirhead)	2	1	0	0	1	1	0	4	X	X	9

Sheet D	1	2	3	4	5	6	7	8	9	10	Final
Latvia (Staša-Šaršūne)	0	1	0	0	0	1	0	X	X	X	2
Switzerland (Tirinzoni)	1	0	2	1	2	0	3	X	X	X	9

Sheet E	1	2	3	4	5	6	7	8	9	10	Final
Denmark (Dupont)	0	0	1	0	1	1	0	1	0	1	5
Czech Republic (Kubešková)	0	2	0	0	0	0	0	0	1	0	3

===== Draw 16 =====
Wednesday, November 21, 19:00

Sheet A	1	2	3	4	5	6	7	8	9	10	Final
Scotland (Muirhead)	0	1	0	2	0	2	1	0	1	0	7
Russia (Kovaleva)	2	0	1	0	2	0	0	1	0	2	8

Sheet B	1	2	3	4	5	6	7	8	9	10	Final
Czech Republic (Kubešková)	0	1	0	0	2	0	1	0	0	X	4
Latvia (Staša-Šaršūne)	0	0	1	1	0	1	0	2	2	X	7

Sheet C	1	2	3	4	5	6	7	8	9	10	Final
Sweden (Hasselborg)	1	2	0	2	2	0	1	X	X	X	8
Finland (Kauste)	0	0	1	0	0	1	0	X	X	X	2

Sheet D	1	2	3	4	5	6	7	8	9	10	11	Final
Denmark (Dupont)	0	0	2	0	0	1	1	2	0	0	0	6
Italy (Zappone)	0	0	0	2	2	0	0	0	1	1	1	7

Sheet E	1	2	3	4	5	6	7	8	9	10	Final
Germany (Jentsch)	1	0	2	0	1	0	0	X	X	X	4
Switzerland (Tirinzoni)	0	2	0	2	0	4	2	X	X	X	10

===== Draw 18 =====
Thursday, November 22, 14:00

Sheet A	1	2	3	4	5	6	7	8	9	10	Final
Czech Republic (Kubešková)	0	1	1	3	3	0	0	2	0	X	10
Finland (Kauste)	0	0	0	0	0	2	1	0	1	X	4

Sheet B	1	2	3	4	5	6	7	8	9	10	Final
Sweden (Hasselborg)	0	2	2	2	0	0	0	1	0	X	7
Germany (Jentsch)	1	0	0	0	1	0	0	0	1	X	3

Sheet C	1	2	3	4	5	6	7	8	9	10	Final
Italy (Zappone)	0	2	0	2	0	2	0	0	1	X	7
Latvia (Staša-Šaršūne)	1	0	3	0	2	0	1	4	0	X	11

Sheet D	1	2	3	4	5	6	7	8	9	10	11	Final
Switzerland (Tirinzoni)	0	0	1	0	0	2	0	0	0	2	1	6
Scotland (Muirhead)	0	0	0	0	2	0	0	2	1	0	0	5

Sheet E	1	2	3	4	5	6	7	8	9	10	Final
Russia (Kovaleva)	3	0	1	2	0	3	0	3	X	X	12
Denmark (Dupont)	0	2	0	0	2	0	1	0	X	X	5

==== Playoffs ====
Semi-finals
1	Switzerland	6
4	Germany	4
2	Sweden	7
3	Russia	4

Final
1	Switzerland	4
2	Sweden	5
Bronze medal game
4	Germany	7
3	Russia	4

===== Semi-finals =====
Friday, November 23, 14:00

Sheet B	1	2	3	4	5	6	7	8	9	10	Final
Switzerland (Tirinzoni)	1	1	1	0	0	2	0	1	0	X	6
Germany (Jentsch)	0	0	0	1	1	0	1	0	1	X	4

Player percentages
Switzerland		Germany	
Melanie Barbezat	80%	Klara-Hermine Fomm	88%
Esther Neuenschwander	85%	Analena Jentsch	84%
Silvana Tirinzoni	85%	Emira Abbes	61%
Alina Pätz	79%	Daniela Jentsch	67%
Total	82%	Total	75%

Sheet C	1	2	3	4	5	6	7	8	9	10	Final
Sweden (Hasselborg)	0	4	0	1	0	1	0	1	0	X	7
Russia (Kovaleva)	0	0	1	0	0	0	2	0	1	X	4

Player percentages
Sweden		Russia	
Sofia Mabergs	86%	Ekaterina Kuzmina	100%
Agnes Knochenhauer	86%	Galina Arsenkina	79%
Sara McManus	97%	Anastasia Bryzgalova	64%
Anna Hasselborg	86%	Alina Kovaleva	74%
Total	89%	Total	79%

===== Bronze medal game =====
Friday, November 23, 19:00

Sheet E	1	2	3	4	5	6	7	8	9	10	Final
Germany (Jentsch)	0	0	3	1	0	0	0	2	1	X	7
Russia (Kovaleva)	2	0	0	0	1	1	0	0	0	X	4

Player percentages
Germany		Russia	
Klara-Hermine Fomm	79%	Ekaterina Kuzmina	93%
Analena Jentsch	84%	Galina Arsenkina	71%
Emira Abbes	69%	Anastasia Bryzgalova	61%
Daniela Jentsch	87%	Alina Kovaleva	75%
Total	79%	Total	75%

===== Gold medal game =====
Saturday, November 24, 10:00

Sheet D	1	2	3	4	5	6	7	8	9	10	Final
Switzerland (Tirinzoni)	1	0	0	1	0	1	0	1	0	0	4
Sweden (Hasselborg)	0	1	0	0	1	0	1	0	0	2	5

Player percentages
Switzerland		Sweden	
Melanie Barbezat	93%	Sofia Mabergs	89%
Esther Neuenschwander	91%	Agnes Knochenhauer	90%
Silvana Tirinzoni	79%	Sara McManus	90%
Alina Pätz	85%	Anna Hasselborg	94%
Total	87%	Total	91%

==== Player percentages ====
Round Robin only

Leads	%
(Switzerland) Melanie Barbezat	86
(Denmark) Mathilde Halse	85
(Scotland) Lauren Gray	84
(Russia) Ekaterina Kuzmina	83
(Sweden) Sofia Mabergs	81

Seconds	%
(Russia) Galina Arsenkina	84
(Sweden) Agnes Knochenhauer	83
(Switzerland) Esther Neuenschwander	83
(Scotland) Victoria Chalmers	79
(Denmark) Julie Høgh	74
(Italy) Angela Romei	74

Thirds	%
(Switzerland) Silvana Tirinzoni	85
(Russia) Anastasia Bryzgalova	81
(Sweden) Sara McManus	80
(Scotland) Jennifer Dodds	79
(Czech Republic) Alzbeta Baudysova	77

Skips/Fourths	%
(Sweden) Anna Hasselborg	84
(Switzerland) Alina Pätz	81
(Russia) Alina Kovaleva	77
(Scotland) Eve Muirhead	76
(Germany) Daniela Jentsch	75
(Italy) Veronica Zappone	75

=== B Division ===
==== Round-robin standings ====
Key
Teams to Playoffs
Teams relegated to 2019 C Division

Country	Skip	W	L
Norway	Kristin Skaslien	8	1
Turkey	Dilşat Yıldız	7	2
Estonia	Marie Turmann	6	3
Lithuania	Virginija Paulauskaitė	5	4
Hungary	Dorottya Palancsa	5	4
England	Lisa Farnell	5	4
Poland	Marta Szeliga-Frynia	4	5
Spain	Oihane Otaegi	3	6
Slovakia	Silvia Sýkorová	1	8
Slovenia	Ajda Zavrtanik Drglin	1	8

==== Playoffs ====
Semi-finals
1	Norway	10
4	Lithuania	8
2	Turkey	3
3	Estonia	7

Gold medal game
1	Norway	7
3	Estonia	6
Bronze medal game
4	Lithuania	5
2	Turkey	6

===== Semi-finals =====
Friday, November 23, 08:30

Sheet H	1	2	3	4	5	6	7	8	9	10	Final
Norway (Skaslien)	2	0	0	0	3	0	3	2	0	X	10
Lithuania (Paulauskaitė)	0	1	1	4	0	1	0	0	1	X	8

Sheet J	1	2	3	4	5	6	7	8	9	10	Final
Turkey (Yıldız)	0	0	1	0	0	0	0	1	1	X	3
Estonia (Turmann)	0	1	0	1	1	3	1	0	0	X	7

===== Bronze medal game =====
Friday, November 23, 20:00

Sheet K	1	2	3	4	5	6	7	8	9	10	Final
Lithuania (Paulauskaitė)	0	1	0	0	1	1	0	1	1	0	5
Turkey (Yıldız)	2	0	1	1	0	0	0	0	0	2	6

===== Gold medal game =====
Friday, November 23, 20:00

Sheet G	1	2	3	4	5	6	7	8	9	10	Final
Norway (Skaslien)	1	1	0	1	1	0	0	2	0	1	7
Estonia (Turmann)	0	0	3	0	0	1	2	0	0	0	6

=== C Division ===
==== Round-robin standings ====
Key
Teams to Playoffs

Country	Skip	W	L
Poland	Marta Szeliga-Frynia	7	0
Slovakia	Silvia Sýkorová	5	2
Slovenia	Nadja Pipan	4	3
Austria	Constanze Ocker	4	3
Belarus	Daria Bogatova	4	3
Croatia	Iva Penava	3	4
France	Eva LaFage	1	6
Belgium	Did Not Attend	0	7

- Belgium Withdrew from the tournament before the first draw began.

==== Playoffs ====
Semi-finals
1	Poland	3
2	Slovakia	4
3	Slovenia	9
4	Austria	8

Second place game
1	Poland	12
3	Slovenia	4

Promoted to B Division
Slovakia
Poland
Remain in C Division
Slovenia
Austria

===== 1 vs. 2 =====
Sheet D	1	2	3	4	5	6	7	8	9	10	Final
Poland (Szeliga-Frynia)	1	0	0	1	1	0	0	0	0	0	3
Slovakia (Sýkorová)	0	2	0	0	0	1	0	0	0	1	4

Winner advances to Group B competitions.
Loser advances to Second place game.

===== 3 vs. 4 =====
Sheet C	1	2	3	4	5	6	7	8	9	10	11	Final
Slovenia (Pipan)	0	2	1	0	0	2	0	0	3	0	1	9
Austria (Ocker)	0	0	0	2	2	0	1	1	0	2	0	8

Winner advances to Second place game.

===== Second place game =====
Sheet B	1	2	3	4	5	6	7	8	9	10	Final
Poland (Szeliga-Frynia)	0	2	3	0	1	2	2	2	X	X	12
Slovenia (Pipan)	2	0	0	2	0	0	0	0	X	X	4

Winner advances to Group B competitions.
