= Marjo Hippi =

Finnish curler

Medal record

Curling

Representing Finland

European Curling Championships
Bronze medal – third place	2015 Esbjerg	

Representing Åland Islands

Finnish Women's Curling Championship
Gold medal – first place	2012	
Gold medal – first place	2013	
Gold medal – first place	2014	
Gold medal – first place	2015	
Gold medal – first place	2020 Lohja	
Silver medal – second place	2009	
Bronze medal – third place	2010	

Marjo Hippi (born 4 February 1978) is a Finnish curler from Helsinki. She currently plays lead for Oona Kauste.

Hippi was born in Nurmo. After beginning curling in 2004, she joined the Tuire Autio rink in 2005 and finished 4th at the Finnish Women's Curling Championship in 2006. The next season she joined the Lare Norri rink as her third and again finished 4th at the Finnish Championship. The rink again finished 4th in 2008. In 2009, the team won their first medal, winning silver. They won a bronze medal at the 2010 Finnish championship.

Hippi's first international curling competition was the 2010 European Mixed Curling Championship, playing lead for the Finnish team, skipped by Tomi Rantamäki. The team would finish in 15th place. That season, Hippi skipped her own women's team, finishing 5th at the 2011 Finnish Women's Curling Championship.

Hippi would play in the 2011 European Curling Championships as the Alternate for Team Finland, skipped by Sanna Puustinen. The team finished 12th with Hippi playing in one game. Hippi joined the Oona Kauste rink that year as her third, and won her first Finnish championships on the team. The next season, Hippi joined the Anne Malmi rink at lead. They played for Finland at the 2012 European Curling Championships. The team would finish 10th. At the 2013 Finnish championship, they would win a gold medal.

In 2013, Hippi joined the Sanna Puustinen team at lead. This team would represent Finland at the 2013 European Curling Championships, placing in 11th. Hippi played with the Sanna Piilo rink in the 2014 Finnish championship, winning another gold.

In 2014, again playing lead for Puustinen, Hippi was a member of the Finnish team at the 2014 European Curling Championships, finishing in 6th place. This qualified Finland for the 2015 World Women's Curling Championship, Hippi's first. There, Finland would finish in 11th place. That season Hippi won another medal at the Finnish championship.

In 2015 Hippi joined the Oona Kauste rink as her lead. The team would go on to win a bronze medal at the 2015 European Curling Championships and finished 11th at the 2016 Ford World Women's Curling Championship.

== Personal life ==
Hippi is employed as a researcher for the Finnish meteorological institute. She obtained a PhD degree in meteorology in 2023. She is in a common law marriage.
