= 2020 Finnish Men's Curling Championship =

- Host city: Lohja
- Arena: Kisakallio Sports Institute
- Dates: December 5, 2019 – February 9, 2020
- Winner: Kiiskinen / Hyvinkää
- Curling club: Hyvinkään Curling ry (Helsinki)
- Skip: Kalle Kiiskinen
- Third: Paavo Kuosmanen
- Second: Wille Mäkelä
- Lead: Juha Pekaristo
- Alternate: Teemu Salo
- Coach: Jouni Mikkonen
- Finalist: Pöllänen / Helsinki (Helsinki; Jermu Pöllänen)

The 2020 Finnish Men's Curling Championship (Finnish: Miesten SM-sarja 2019–2020) was held at the Kisakallio Sports Institute in Lohja from December 5, 2019, to February 9, 2020.

The team skipped by Kalle Kiiskinen won the championship (Kiiskinen won his ninth title as player but fifth title as skip).

The 2020 Finnish Women's Curling Championship was held simultaneously with this championship at the same arena.

== Teams ==
| Team | Skip | Third | Second | Lead | Alternate | Coach | Curling club, locale |
|---|---|---|---|---|---|---|---|
| Kalpamaa / Naantali | Mika Kalpamaa | Ilkka Eivola | Veli-Pekka Keskisarja | Tomi Kirjonen | Heikki Rauvola | | Copper Hill Curling Club ry, Naantali |
| Kiiskinen / Hyvinkää | Kalle Kiiskinen | Paavo Kuosmanen | Wille Mäkelä | Juha Pekaristo | Teemu Salo | Jouni Mikkonen | Hyvinkään Curling ry, Helsinki |
| Pöllänen / Helsinki | Jermu Pöllänen | Melker Lundberg | Jason Moore | Jere Sullanmaa | Iikko Säntti | | Helsingin Yliopiston Curlaajat, Helsinki |
| Rissanen / Vantaa | Olli Rissanen | Petri Kauste | Pekka Kouvo | Kai Wist | | | M-Curling, Vantaa |
| Saarelainen / Helsinki | Jari Saarelainen | Jukka Alarautalammi | Kari Kokkonen | Pekka Salonen | Sami Tammi | | Helsingin Yliopiston Curlaajat, Helsinki |
| Sipilä / Helsinki | Markus Sipilä | Kasper Hakunti | Janne Ojanperä | Leo Ouni | Juha Pääjärvi | | Kisakallio Curling Club, Helsinki |
| Tahvanainen / Joensuu | Tero Tahvanainen | Immo Eronen | Tuomas Korpela | Juha Nissinen | Erno Pennanen, Toni Sepperi, Jaakko Sivonen | | Joensuun Curling Ry, Joensuu |
| Turto / Harjavalta | Jari Turto | Tapani Härkälä | Ari Kuusholma | Mika Matarmaa | Markku Olshin | | Hiittenharju Curling ry, Harjavalta |

== Round Robin ==
| | Team | A1 | A2 | A3 | A4 | A5 | A6 | A7 | A8 | Wins | Losses | Place |
|---|---|---|---|---|---|---|---|---|---|---|---|---|
| A1 | Kalpamaa / Naantali | * | 5:13; 3:14 | 2:8; 7:12 | 3:7; 9:4 | 6:10; 7:8 | 5:10; 5:11 | 3:8; 3:11 | 8:4; 10:6 | 3 | 11 | 7 |
| A2 | Kiiskinen / Hyvinkää | 13:5; 14:3 | * | 4:8; 8:6 | 13:1; 11:4 | 12:3; 8:5 | 10:5; 7:6 | 7:1; 12:5 | 10:3; 10:6 | 13 | 1 | 1 |
| A3 | Pöllänen / Helsinki | 8:2; 12:7 | 8:4; 6:8 | * | 9:6; 10:4 | 13:3; 10:1 | 6:9; 10:11 | 10:2; 12:2 | 11:3; 9:5 | 11 | 3 | 2 |
| A4 | Rissanen / Vantaa | 7:3; 4:9 | 1:13; 4:11 | 6:9; 4:10 | * | 5:2; 11:7 | 5:7; 8:7 | 8:2; 7:10 | 9:6; 6:7 | 6 | 8 | 4 |
| A5 | Saarelainen / Helsinki | 10:6; 8:7 | 3:12; 5:8 | 3:13; 1:10 | 2:5; 7:11 | * | 4:8; 7:13 | 8:9; 4:8 | 6:12; 3:10 | 2 | 12 | 8 |
| A6 | Sipilä / Helsinki | 10:5; 11:5 | 5:10; 6:7 | 9:6; 11:10 | 7:5; 7:8 | 8:4; 13:7 | * | 9:5; 6:5 | 10:3; 8:10 | 10 | 4 | 3 |
| A7 | Tahvanainen / Joensuu | 8:3; 11:3 | 1:7; 5:12 | 2:10; 2:12 | 2:8; 10:7 | 9:8; 8:4 | 5:9; 5:6 | * | 4:5; 6:9 | 5 | 9 | 6 |
| A8 | Turto / Harjavalta | 4:8; 6:10 | 3:10; 6:10 | 3:11; 5:9 | 6:9; 7:6 | 12:6; 10:3 | 3:10; 10:8 | 5:4; 9:6 | * | 6 | 8 | 5 |

Teams to Medal Round

== Medal Round ==
| | Team | B1 | B2 | B3 | B4 | Wins (RR+MR) | Losses (RR+MR) | Place |
|---|---|---|---|---|---|---|---|---|
| B1 | Kiiskinen / Hyvinkää | * | 10:2; 1:7 | 13:2; 2:8 | 5:9; 8:7 | 13+3=16 | 1+3=4 | 1 |
| B2 | Pöllänen / Helsinki | 2:10; 7:1 | * | 7:6; 14:7 | 4:11; 12:9 | 11+4=15 | 3+2=5 | 2 |
| B3 | Rissanen / Vantaa | 2:13; 8:2 | 6:7; 7:14 | * | 4:8; 8:11 | 6+1=7 | 8+5=13 | 4 |
| B4 | Sipilä / Helsinki | 9:5; 7:8 | 11:4; 9:12 | 8:4; 11:8 | * | 10+4=14 | 4+2=6 | 3 |

== Final standings ==
| Place | Team | Skip | Games | Wins | Losses |
|---|---|---|---|---|---|
| 1st place, gold medalist(s) | Kiiskinen / Hyvinkää | Kalle Kiiskinen | 20 | 16 | 4 |
| 2nd place, silver medalist(s) | Pöllänen / Helsinki | Jermu Pöllänen | 20 | 15 | 5 |
| 3rd place, bronze medalist(s) | Sipilä / Helsinki | Markus Sipilä | 20 | 14 | 6 |
| 4 | Rissanen / Vantaa | Olli Rissanen | 20 | 7 | 13 |
| 5 | Turto / Harjavalta | Jari Turto | 14 | 6 | 8 |
| 6 | Tahvanainen / Joensuu | Tero Tahvanainen | 14 | 5 | 9 |
| 7 | Kalpamaa / Naantali | Mika Kalpamaa | 14 | 3 | 11 |
| 8 | Saarelainen / Helsinki | Jari Saarelainen | 14 | 2 | 12 |

== See also ==
- 2020 Finnish Women's Curling Championship
