= Jenni Räsänen =

Finnish curler (born 1990)

Medal record

Curling

Representing Finland

European Curling Championships
Bronze medal – third place	2015 Esbjerg	

Representing Åland Islands

Finnish Women's Curling Championship
Gold medal – first place	2017	
Gold medal – first place	2020 Lohja	
Silver medal – second place	2012	
Silver medal – second place	2014	
Silver medal – second place	2015	
Bronze medal – third place	2013	
Bronze medal – third place	2016	

Finnish Mixed Curling Championship
Gold medal – first place	2016	
Silver medal – second place	2013	

Jenni Räsänen (born 5 December 1990) is a Finnish curler. She currently plays lead for Oona Kauste.

After marriage in 2018 she changed surname, now she is Jenni Honkavaara.
