= 2020 Finnish Women's Curling Championship =

- Host city: Lohja
- Arena: Kisakallio Sports Institute
- Dates: December 5, 2019 – January 5, 2020
- Winner: Sullanmaa / Helsinki
- Curling club: Hyvinkään Curling ry (Helsinki)
- Skip: Milja Sullanmaa
- Third: Marjo Hippi
- Second: Emmi Lindroos
- Lead: Jenni Räsänen
- Alternate: Maija Salmiovirta
- Finalist: Turto / Harjavalta (Harjavalta; Miia Turto)

The 2020 Finnish Women's Curling Championship (Finnish: Naisten SM-sarja 2019-2020) was held at the Kisakallio Sports Institute in Lohja from December 5, 2019 to January 5, 2020.

The team skipped by Milja Sullanmaa won the championship (Sullanmaa won her second title as player but first title as skip).

The 2020 Finnish Men's Curling Championship was held simultaneously with this championship at the same arena.

== Teams ==
Team	Skip	Third	Second	Lead	Alternate	Curling club, locale
Sullanmaa / Helsinki	Milja Sullanmaa	Marjo Hippi	Emmi Lindroos	Jenni Räsänen	Maija Salmiovirta	Hyvinkään Curling ry, Helsinki
Turto / Harjavalta	Miia Turto	Minna Karvinen	Laura Kitti	Tuuli Rissanen		Hiittenharju Curling ry, Harjavalta
Virtaala / Joensuu	Elina Virtaala	Janina Lindström	Riikka Louhivuori	Tiina Suuripää		Joensuun Curling Ry, Joensuu

== Round Robin ==
	Team	A1	A2	A3	Wins	Losses	Place
A1	Sullanmaa / Helsinki	*	9:4; 11:4; 9:3; 11:8	7:10; 10:4; 2:6; 9:3	6	2	1st place, gold medalist(s)
A2	Turto / Harjavalta	4:9; 4:11; 3:9; 8:11	*	8:6; 6:4; 12:11; 8:7	4	4	2nd place, silver medalist(s)
A3	Virtaala / Joensuu	10:7; 4:10; 6:2; 3:9	6:8; 4:6; 11:12; 7:8	*	2	6	3rd place, bronze medalist(s)

=== Round 1 ===
December 5, 2019; 19:00

Sheet 1	1	2	3	4	5	6	7	8	9	10	Final
Sullanmaa / Helsinki	2	0	1	1	0	1	3	0	1	X	9
Turto / Harjavalta	0	1	0	0	2	0	0	1	0	X	4

December 6, 2019; 20:00

Sheet 1	1	2	3	4	5	6	7	8	9	10	Final
Virtaala / Joensuu	1	0	4	0	2	0	3	0	0	X	10
Sullanmaa / Helsinki	0	0	0	2	0	2	0	2	1	X	7

December 7, 2019; 12:00

Sheet 1	1	2	3	4	5	6	7	8	9	10	Final
Turto / Harjavalta	2	2	0	0	0	1	2	1	0	X	8
Virtaala / Joensuu	0	0	1	1	1	0	0	0	3	X	6

=== Round 2 ===
December 7, 2019; 20:00

Sheet 1	1	2	3	4	5	6	7	8	9	10	Final
Sullanmaa / Helsinki	0	2	0	0	1	1	1	2	3	X	10
Virtaala / Joensuu	1	0	0	3	0	0	0	0	0	X	4

December 8, 2019; 08:00

Sheet 1	1	2	3	4	5	6	7	8	9	10	Final
Virtaala / Joensuu	1	0	0	0	0	1	0	0	2	0	4
Turto / Harjavalta	0	1	0	1	1	0	1	1	0	1	6

December 8, 2019; 17:00

Sheet 1	1	2	3	4	5	6	7	8	9	10	Final
Turto / Harjavalta	0	0	2	0	0	2	0	0	X	X	4
Sullanmaa / Helsinki	1	1	0	4	1	0	2	2	X	X	11

=== Round 3 ===
January 2, 2020; 19:00

Sheet 1	1	2	3	4	5	6	7	8	9	10	Final
Turto / Harjavalta	0	0	1	1	0	0	0	1	X	X	3
Sullanmaa / Helsinki	0	3	0	0	3	1	2	0	X	X	9

January 3, 2020; 16:00

Sheet 1	1	2	3	4	5	6	7	8	9	10	11	Final
Virtaala / Joensuu	0	0	0	4	0	0	1	0	4	2	0	11
Turto / Harjavalta	3	1	3	0	2	1	0	1	0	0	1	12

January 4, 2020; 08:00

Sheet 1	1	2	3	4	5	6	7	8	9	10	Final
Sullanmaa / Helsinki	0	0	0	0	1	0	1	0	0	X	2
Virtaala / Joensuu	0	2	1	0	0	1	0	1	1	X	6

=== Round 4 ===
January 4, 2020; 16:00

Sheet 1	1	2	3	4	5	6	7	8	9	10	Final
Turto / Harjavalta	0	2	0	0	1	1	0	1	0	3	8
Virtaala / Joensuu	0	0	3	2	0	0	1	0	1	0	7

January 5, 2020; 09:00

Sheet 1	1	2	3	4	5	6	7	8	9	10	Final
Virtaala / Joensuu	1	0	1	0	1	0	0	0	X	X	3
Sullanmaa / Helsinki	0	2	0	1	0	2	2	2	X	X	9

January 5, 2020; 13:00

Sheet 1	1	2	3	4	5	6	7	8	9	10	Final
Sullanmaa / Helsinki	3	0	0	1	0	4	0	2	0	1	11
Turto / Harjavalta	0	2	2	0	2	0	1	0	1	0	8

== Final standings ==
Place	Team	Skip	Games	Wins	Losses
1st place, gold medalist(s)	Sullanmaa / Helsinki	Milja Sullanmaa	8	6	2
2nd place, silver medalist(s)	Turto / Harjavalta	Miia Turto	8	4	4
3rd place, bronze medalist(s)	Virtaala / Joensuu	Elina Virtaala	8	2	6

== See also ==
- 2020 Finnish Men's Curling Championship
