= 2015 European Curling Championships =

- Host city: Esbjerg, Denmark
- Arena: Granly Hockey Arena; Esbjerg Curling Club
- Dates: November 20–28
- Men's winner: Sweden
- Curling club: Karlstads CK, Karlstad
- Skip: Niklas Edin
- Third: Oskar Eriksson
- Second: Kristian Lindström
- Lead: Christoffer Sundgren
- Alternate: Henrik Leek
- Finalist: Switzerland (Peter de Cruz)
- Women's winner: Russia
- Curling club: Moskvitch CC, Moscow
- Skip: Anna Sidorova
- Third: Margarita Fomina
- Second: Alexandra Raeva
- Lead: Nkeirouka Ezekh
- Alternate: Alina Kovaleva
- Finalist: Scotland (Eve Muirhead)

The 2015 European Curling Championships were held from November 20 to 28 in Esbjerg, Denmark. Denmark last hosted the European Curling Championships in 1996 in Copenhagen. The Group C competitions were held during October in Champéry, Switzerland.

At the conclusion of the championships, the top eight women's teams went to the 2016 Ford World Women's Curling Championship in Swift Current, and the top seven men's teams to the 2016 World Men's Curling Championship in Basel.

== Men ==
=== Group A ===
The Group A competitions were contested at the Granly Hockey Arena in Esbjerg.

==== Round-robin standings ====
Key
Teams to Playoffs
Teams to Tiebreaker
Teams relegated to 2016 Group B

Final round-robin standings

Country	Skip	W	L
Norway	Thomas Ulsrud	9	0
Finland	Aku Kauste	5	4
Switzerland	Peter de Cruz	5	4
Sweden	Niklas Edin	5	4
Scotland	Kyle Smith	5	4
Germany	Alexander Baumann	4	5
Russia	Alexey Stukalskiy	4	5
Italy	Joël Retornaz	3	6
Czech Republic	David Šik	3	6
Netherlands	Jaap van Dorp	2	7

==== Playoffs ====
Semifinals
1	Norway	7
4	Sweden	8
2	Finland	4
3	Switzerland	10

Final
4	Sweden	7
3	Switzerland	6

Bronze-medal game
1	Norway	7
2	Finland	4

==== Bronze-medal game ====
Friday, November 27, 19:00

Team	1	2	3	4	5	6	7	8	9	10	Final
Norway (Ulsrud)	1	2	0	2	0	1	0	1	0	X	7
Finland (Kauste)	0	0	1	0	1	0	1	0	1	X	4

Player percentages
Norway		Finland	
Håvard Vad Petersson	79%	Janne Pitko	96%
Christoffer Svae	96%	Pauli Jäämies	89%
Torger Nergård	98%	Kasper Hakunti	83%
Thomas Ulsrud	92%	Aku Kauste	84%
Total	91%	Total	86%

==== Gold-medal game ====
Saturday, November 27, 10:00

Team	1	2	3	4	5	6	7	8	9	10	11	Final
Sweden (Edin)	0	0	0	2	0	2	0	2	0	0	1	7
Switzerland (de Cruz)	2	0	0	0	1	0	1	0	0	2	0	6

Player percentages
Sweden		Switzerland	
Christoffer Sundgren	94%	Valentin Tanner	90%
Kristian Lindström	88%	Peter de Cruz	89%
Oskar Eriksson	91%	Claudio Pätz	85%
Niklas Edin	93%	Benoît Schwarz	93%
Total	92%	Total	89%

=== Group B ===
The Group B competitions will be contested at the Esbjerg Curling Club in Esbjerg.

==== Round Robin standings ====
Key
Teams to Playoffs
Teams to Tiebreaker
Teams relegated to 2016 Group C

Final round-robin standings

Pool A	Skip	W	L
Denmark	Rasmus Stjerne	7	0
Lithuania	Tadas Vyskupaitis	5	2
Turkey	Alican Karataş	4	3
Slovenia	Tomas Tišler	4	3
Hungary	György Nagy	3	4
Poland	Tomasz Zioło	2	5
Wales	James Pougher	2	5
Belgium	Timothy Verreycken	1	6

Final round-robin standings

Pool B	Skip	W	L
Austria	Sebastian Wunderer	6	1
Latvia	Ritvars Gulbis	6	1
Israel	Adam Freilich	4	3
England	Alan MacDougall	4	3
Slovakia	Juraj Gallo	3	4
Spain	Antonio de Mollinedo	3	4
Croatia	Alen Čadež	2	5
Estonia	Martin Lill	0	7

==== Relegation round ====
Relegation Finals
B7	Croatia	8
A8	Belgium	10

Relegation Semifinals
A7	Wales	10
B7	Croatia	4
A8	Belgium	6
B8	Estonia	5

==== Playoffs ====
Quarterfinals
B2	Latvia	8
A3	Slovenia	2
A2	Lithuania	7
B3	Israel	9

Semifinals
A1	Denmark	10
B2	Latvia	5
B1	Austria	7
B3	Israel	4

Final
A1	Denmark	6
B1	Austria	4

Bronze-medal game
B2	Latvia	13
B3	Israel	3

==== Bronze-medal game ====
Friday, November 27, 13:30

Team	1	2	3	4	5	6	7	8	9	10	Final
Latvia (Gulbis)	3	1	0	1	4	0	2	2	X	X	13
Israel (Freilich)	0	0	1	0	0	2	0	0	X	X	3

==== Gold-medal game ====
Friday, November 27, 13:30

Team	1	2	3	4	5	6	7	8	9	10	Final
Denmark (Stjerne)	0	1	2	0	0	2	0	1	0	X	6
Austria (Wunderer)	0	0	0	1	1	0	1	0	1	X	4

=== Group C ===
The Group C competitions will be contested at the Palladium de Champéry in Champéry.

==== Round Robin standings ====
Final round-robin standings

Key
Teams to Playoffs

Country	Skip	W	L
Slovakia	Juraj Gallo	9	1
Slovenia	Tomas Tišler	8	2
France	Wilfrid Coulot	7	3
Ireland	James Russell	7	3
Serbia	Bojan Mijatović	6	4
Bulgaria	Reto Seiler	5	5
Belarus	Pavel Petrov	5	5
Luxembourg	Marc Hansen	4	6
Romania	Allen Coliban	3	7
Iceland	Olafur Hreinsson	1	9
Andorra	Josep Garcia	0	10

==== Playoffs ====
Second Place Game
1	Slovakia	7
3	France	5

Semifinals
1	Slovakia	1
2	Slovenia	8
3	France	5
4	Ireland	3

== Women ==
=== Group A ===
The Group A competitions were contested at the Granly Hockey Arena in Esbjerg.

==== Round-robin standings ====
Key
Teams to Playoffs
Teams relegated to 2016 Group B

Final round-robin standings

Country	Skip	W	L
Russia	Anna Sidorova	8	1
Scotland	Eve Muirhead	7	2
Finland	Oona Kauste	6	3
Denmark	Lene Nielsen	6	3
Sweden	Cissi Östlund	5	4
Switzerland	Alina Pätz	4	5
Germany	Daniela Driendl	4	5
Norway	Kristin Skaslien	3	6
Estonia	Maile Mölder	1	8
Hungary	Dorottya Palancsa	1	8

==== Playoffs ====
Semifinals
1	Russia	6
4	Denmark	5
2	Scotland	9
3	Finland	7

Final
1	Russia	6
2	Scotland	4

Bronze-medal game
4	Denmark	8
3	Finland	10

==== Bronze-medal game ====
Friday, November 27, 19:00

Team	1	2	3	4	5	6	7	8	9	10	Final
Denmark (Nielsen)	0	1	0	2	0	2	0	0	3	0	8
Finland (Kauste)	1	0	1	0	4	0	1	2	0	1	10

Player percentages
Denmark		Finland	
Charlotte Clemmensen	90%	Marjo Hippi	80%
Stephenie Risdal Nielsen	89%	Maija Salmiovirta	88%
Helle Simonsen	94%	Milja Hellsten	68%
Lene Nielsen	85%	Oona Kauste	88%
Total	90%	Total	81%

==== Gold-medal game ====
Saturday, November 28, 15:00

Team	1	2	3	4	5	6	7	8	9	10	Final
Russia (Sidorova)	0	2	0	1	0	1	0	1	0	1	6
Scotland (Muirhead)	0	0	2	0	1	0	0	0	1	0	4

Player percentages
Russia		Scotland	
Nkeiruka Ezekh	93%	Sarah Reid	91%
Alexandra Raeva	93%	Vicki Adams	89%
Margarita Fomina	76%	Anna Sloan	89%
Anna Sidorova	88%	Eve Muirhead	79%
Total	88%	Total	87%

=== Group B ===
The Group B competitions were contested at the Esbjerg Curling Club in Esbjerg.

==== Round-robin standings ====
Key
Teams to Playoffs
Teams to Tiebreaker
Teams relegated to 2016 Group C

Final round-robin standings

Country	Skip	W	L
Italy	Federica Apollonio	7	2
Latvia	Evita Regža	7	2
Czech Republic	Anna Kubešková	7	2
England	Anna Fowler	6	3
Turkey	Dilşat Yıldız	6	3
Poland	Marta Szeliga-Frynia	5	4
Slovakia	Gabriela Kajanova	3	6
Netherlands	Marianne Neeleman	2	7
France	Pauline Jeanneret	1	8
Austria	Hannah Augustin	1	8

==== Playoffs ====
Semifinals
1	Italy	7
4	England	3
2	Latvia	5
3	Czech Republic	7

Final
1	Italy	7
3	Czech Republic	6

Bronze-medal game
4	England	7
2	Latvia	8

==== Bronze-medal game ====
Friday, November 27, 13:30

Team	1	2	3	4	5	6	7	8	9	10	Final
England (Fowler)	0	3	0	1	1	0	0	0	0	2	7
Latvia (Regža)	2	0	1	0	0	2	1	1	1	0	8

==== Gold-medal game ====
Friday, November 27, 13:30

Team	1	2	3	4	5	6	7	8	9	10	11	Final
Italy (Apollonio)	1	0	1	0	0	0	2	0	2	0	1	7
Czech Republic (Kubešková)	0	1	0	0	0	1	0	1	0	3	0	6

=== Group C ===
The Group C competitions were contested at the Palladium de Champéry in Champéry.

==== Round-robin standings ====
Final round-robin standings

Key
Teams to Playoffs
Teams to Tiebreaker

Country	Skip	W	L
France	Pauline Jeanneret	6	1
Slovakia	Nina Kremzar	6	1
Belarus	Alina Pavlyuchik	4	3
Ireland	Alison Fyfe	3	4
Spain	Irantzu Garcia	3	4
Slovenia	Gabriela Kajanova	3	4
Croatia	Iva Penava	2	5
Romania	Raluca Daiana Colceriu	1	6

==== Playoffs ====
Second Place Game
2	Slovakia	7
4	Ireland	6

Semifinals
1	France	6
2	Slovakia	4
3	Belarus	5
4	Ireland	7
