= Maija Salmiovirta =

Finnish curler

Medal record

Curling

Representing Finland

European Curling Championships
Bronze medal – third place	2015 Esbjerg	

Representing Åland Islands

Finnish Women's Curling Championship
Gold medal – first place	2014	
Gold medal – first place	2015	
Gold medal – first place	2020 Lohja	
Silver medal – second place	2011	
Silver medal – second place	2013	
Bronze medal – third place	2012	

Maija Salmiovirta (born January 11, 1982, in Helsinki) is a Finnish curler. She currently plays second for Oona Kauste.

Salmiovirta started curling in 2008 and immediately joined the Bettina Mandelin team at lead, finishing 7th in the 2009 Finnish Women's Curling Championship, the next year they would finish fifth. In 2010, she joined the Ellen Vogt rink as her lead, winning a silver medal at the 2011 Finnish championship. The team would play in three World Curling Tour events that season as well. With Vogt, Salmiovirta won bronze medal at the 2012 Finnish championship and a silver in 2013.

Salmiovirta would play as the alternate for the Finnish national team, skipped by Sanna Puustinen at the 2013 European Curling Championships. Salmiovirta would play in one game and the team finished in 11th. Playing lead for Team Puustinen, Salmiovirta won a gold medal at the 2014 Finnish Championship. The next season, Salmiovirta would once again play as Finland's alternate at the European Championships. Salmiovirta did not play in any games at the 2014 European Curling Championships and the team finished 6th. They would also play in the 2015 World Women's Curling Championship. Salmiovirta would play in two games and the rink placed 11th. After the season, Salmiovirta joined the Oona Kauste rink as her second. The team would go on to win a bronze medal at the 2015 European Curling Championships and represent Finland at the 2016 Ford World Women's Curling Championship.

== Personal life ==
Salmiovirta is employed as a fundraising coordinator with the John Nurminen Foundation.
