= Milja Hellsten =

Finnish curler (born 1990)

Medal record

Curling

Representing Finland

European Curling Championships
Bronze medal – third place	2015 Esbjerg	

Representing Åland Islands

Finnish Women's Curling Championship
Gold medal – first place	2020 Lohja	
Silver medal – second place	2015	
Silver medal – second place	2014	
Bronze medal – third place	2013	

Milja Hellsten (born 12 June 1990 in Jämsä, after marriage known as Milja Sullanmaa) is a Finnish curler from Hyvinkää. She currently plays third for Oona Kauste.

As a junior curler, Hellsten skipped the Finnish team at the 2010 European Junior Curling Challenge, placing 5th.

After juniors, Hellsten would join the Katja Kiiskinen as her third. They would win a bronze medal at the 2013 Finnish Women's Curling Championship and a silver medal in 2014. Hellsten would form her own team for the next season, winning a silver medal at the Finnish championship. That season she would play in her first World Curling Tour event, the International ZO Women's Tournament, where she would win just one game.

In 2015, Hellsten joined the Oona Kauste rink as her third. The team would go on to win a bronze medal at the 2015 European Curling Championships.

== Personal life ==
Hellsten is employed as a restaurant shift manager. She is in a common law marriage.
