= Sanna Puustinen =

Finnish curler

Medal record

Curling

Representing Finland

European Mixed Curling Championship
Bronze medal – third place	2012 Erzerum	

Sanna Puustinen (born 24 March 1988; in marriage also known as Sanna Piilo) is a Finnish curler. Puustinen grew up in Hyvinkää but lives in Helsinki.

Puustinen has represented Finland in four European Curling Championships. She was an alternate at her first European Championships in 2005. She didn't play in any games, and the team placed 10th. She played in 2011 European Curling Championships as fourth player with Heidi Hossi, and Eszter Juhász team skipped by Oona Kauste, and placed 12th (8–1 in the B Division). The team returned to the Euros at the 2013 European Curling Championships, with new lead Marjo Hipp. The team finished in 11th place, winning the B Division, and promoting Finland to the A Division of the 2014 European Curling Championships. There, Puustinen led her rink to a 5–4 record, and a 6th-place finish. This qualified Finland for the 2015 World Women's Curling Championship.

Puustinen also played at the 2012 European Mixed Curling Championship, playing third for the Finnish team, skipped by Aku Kauste. There, she won a bronze medal.

Puustinen has won four Finnish Women's Curling Championships, winning in 2011 with Tiina Kölhi in 2012 with Oona Kauste, 2013 with Anne Malmi and in 2014 as skip.
