= Finnish Women's Curling Championship =

The Finnish Women's Curling Championship is the national championship of women's curling in Finland. It has been held annually since 1994. From 1994 until 1998 it was known as the Finnish Cup. Since 1999 the Finnish championship team has been determined by the winning team of the Finnish Women's Championships league.

== List of champions ==
Year	Skip
1994	Sirpa Tiitinen
1995	Jaana Jokela
1996	Jaana Jokela
1997	Jaana Jokela
1998	Jaana Jokela
1999	Anne Malmi
2000	Jaana Hämäläinen
2001	Jaana Jokela
2002	Kirsi Nykänen
2003	Kirsi Nykänen
2004	Kirsi Nykänen
2005	Kirsi Nykänen
2006	Anne Malmi
2007	Anne Malmi
2008	Anne Malmi
2009	Ellen Vogt
2010	Ellen Vogt
2011	Tiina Kölhi
2012	Oona Kauste
2013	Anne Malmi
2014	Sanna Puustinen
2015	Sanna Puustinen
2016	Anne Malmi
2017	Oona Kauste
2018	Oona Kauste
2019	Oona Kauste
2020	Milja Sullanmaa
2026	Jenni Bäckman

== See also ==
- Finnish Men's Curling Championship
- Finnish Mixed Curling Championship
- Finnish Mixed Doubles Curling Championship
- Finnish Wheelchair Curling Championship
- Finnish Junior Curling Championships
- Finnish Wheelchair Mixed Doubles Curling Championship
