= Oona Kauste =

Finnish curler (born 1988)

- Curler
- Born: 4 January 1988 (age 38); Espoo, Finland

Team
- Mixed doubles partner: Aku Kauste

Curling career
- Member Association: Finland
- World Championship: 3 (2015, 2016, 2019)
- World Mixed Doubles Championship: 4 (2016, 2017, 2018, 2021)
- European Championship: 8 (2009, 2011, 2012, 2013, 2014, 2015, 2017, 2018)
- Olympic: 1 (2018)
Medal record
Curling
Representing Finland
European Curling Championships
Bronze medal – third place	2015 Esbjerg
European Mixed Curling Championship
Bronze medal – third place	2012 Erzerum

Oona Kauste (born 4 January 1988, in Espoo) is a Finnish curler from Helsinki. She is currently the skip of the Finnish National Women's team.

== Career ==
=== Women's ===
Kauste has represented Finland in seven European Curling Championships. She was an alternate at her first European Championships in 2009. The team, skipped by Ellen Vogt placed 8th. She played second and as a skip at the 2011 European Curling Championships, placing 12th. She returned the following year playing third for Anne Malmi, placing 10th. She returned to the Euros at the 2013 European Curling Championships playing second for Puustinen. The team finished in 11th place, winning the B Division, and promoting Finland to the A Division of the 2014 European Curling Championships. There, the team finished with a 5–4 record, and a 6th-place finish. This qualified Finland for the 2015 World Women's Curling Championship. At the 2015 Worlds, the team finished with a 2–9 record, in 11th place.

Kauste took over as skip of the Finnish team in 2015, leading her team at the 2015 European Curling Championships. There, the rink finished with a 6-3 round robin record, in a tie for third place. In the semifinals, she lost to Scotland's Eve Muirhead, but rebounded to win the bronze medal against Denmark's Lene Nielsen. This qualified the team to play at the 2016 World Women's Curling Championship. They were less successful there, finishing with a 1–10 record, in 11th place.

Kauste skipped Finland at the 2018 Winter Olympics qualification event, but lost all six matches, failing to qualify her women's team for the Olympics.

Kauste has won six Finnish Women's Curling Championships, winning in 2011 with Tiina Kölhi in 2012 as skip, 2013 with Anne Malmi, in 2014 and 2015 with Sanna Puustinen and in 2017 as a skip.

=== Mixed doubles ===
Kauste and partner Tomi Rantamäki represented Finland at both the 2016 and 2017 World Mixed Doubles Curling Championship. In 2016, the pair won their group with a 6–0 record, and made it to the quarterfinals where they lost to Russia. They would eventually finish in 7th place. In 2017, they finished 5–2 in pool play, and again lost in the quarter-finals, this time to the Czechs. They would again finish 7th. Their pair of seventh-place finishes would qualify the team to represent Finland in the 2018 Winter Olympics. There, they won just one game, and finished in last place.

Kauste also played at the 2012 European Mixed Curling Championship, playing lead for the Finnish team, skipped by her brother, Aku. There, she won a bronze medal.

== Personal life ==
Kauste works as a hairdresser and makeup artist, and owns her own salon. She attended the International Maker Academy and the Omnia Vocational College.
