= Americas Challenge =

- Established: 2009
- Abolished: 2021

The Americas Challenge was a curling challenge held by the World Curling Federation between teams in its Americas zone. The winner of the challenge qualified their country for the World Curling Championships, and in later years, the runner-up for the now defunct World Qualification Event. The challenge is not automatically held every year, and only takes place when a team in the Americas zone challenges the second-ranked Americas team in that year's World Curling Championship (or the first-ranked team if the second-ranked is hosting).

The challenge merged with the Pacific-Asia Curling Championships to become the Pan Continental Curling Championships in 2022.

== History ==
The first challenge was held in 2009, with Brazil losing to the United States. Brazil again challenged and lost to the United States in 2010, 2015, and 2017. In January 2018, with the United States automatically qualifying as hosts of the 2018 World Men's Curling Championship, Brazil challenged and lost to Canada. The November 2018 challenge was the first to see more than two teams competing, with Guyana joining the challenge for the first time. In 2019, Mexico joined the challenge with Guyana not competing. United States would win again, going 4-0.

A women's event has only been held twice, in 2017 and 2019. In 2017, Brazil challenged the United States but lost. Brazil's women's team challenged the United States in November 2018, but conceded to the United States to qualify for the World Qualification Event. In 2019, Mexico joined the challenge but the United States still won going 4-0.

== Champions ==
Name of fourth, then third, second, lead and alternate (if have) is listed in the team member list. Skip is in fourth position unless noted otherwise.

Year	Location	Men		Women	
Year	Location	Winning country	Winning team	Winning country	Winning team
2009	(United States) Bismarck	United States	Todd Birr, Paul Pustovar, Greg Wilson, Kevin Birr	No challenge held	
2010	(United States) Grafton	United States	Pete Fenson, Shawn Rojeski, Joe Polo, Tyler George	No challenge held	
2012	(United States) Bemidji	No challenge held		No challenge held	
2015	(United States) Blaine	United States	Heath McCormick, Chris Plys, Joe Polo, Ryan Brunt, Colin Hufman	No challenge held	
2017	(United States) Blaine	United States	John Shuster, Tyler George, Matt Hamilton, John Landsteiner, Joe Polo	United States	Nina Roth, Tabitha Peterson, Aileen Geving, Becca Hamilton, Cory Christensen
2018 (Jan.)	(Canada) London	Canada	Glenn Howard, Adam Spencer, David Mathers, Scott Howard	No challenge held	
2018 (Nov.)	(United States) Chaska	United States	Greg Persinger, Rich Ruohonen (skip), Colin Hufman, Phil Tilker	No challenge held	
2019	(United States) Eveleth	United States	Greg Persinger, Rich Ruohonen (skip), Colin Hufman, Phil Tilker, Tyler George	United States	Tabitha Peterson, Becca Hamilton, Tara Peterson, Aileen Geving, Natalie Nicholson
2021	(Canada) Lacombe	Canada	Brendan Bottcher, Darren Moulding, Brad Thiessen, Karrick Martin	No challenge held	
