= 2019 Americas Challenge =

- Host city: Eveleth, Minnesota, United States
- Arena: Curl Mesabi
- Dates: November 28–30
- Men's winner: United States
- Skip: Rich Ruohonen
- Fourth: Greg Persinger
- Second: Colin Hufman
- Lead: Phil Tilker
- Alternate: Tyler George
- Finalist: Mexico (Tompkins)
- Women's winner: United States
- Skip: Tabitha Peterson
- Third: Becca Hamilton
- Second: Tara Peterson
- Lead: Aileen Geving
- Alternate: Natalie Nicholson
- Finalist: Mexico (Camarena Osorno)

The 2019 Americas Challenge is a curling challenge that took place from November 28 to 30 at Curl Mesabi in Eveleth, Minnesota. This challenge determined the second team from the Americas Zone to qualify for the 2020 World Men's Championship and the 2020 World Women's Championship. It was held as part of the 2019 Curl Mesabi Classic World Curling Tour event.

The United States won both the men's and women's events, with Mexico having a successful debut, finishing second in both events. The men's US team, skipped by Rich Ruohonen went on to the finals of the Curl Mesabi Classic where they lost to a fellow American rink skipped by Korey Dropkin. The women's US team went on to the semifinals of the Curl Mesabi Classic, losing to Canada's Laura Walker rink.

== Background ==
The World Curling Federation allots two men's and two women's spots for the Americas Zone at the World Curling Championships. For the 2020 Championships Canada has automatically claimed the first slot for both men's, due to having the best final ranking of the Zone in the 2019 Championship, and women's, due to being the host country. If Canada was not hosting the Women's Championship the United States would have received the automatic berth due to finishing one spot higher in the 2019 Championship.

Mexico and Brazil challenged the United States, who would have otherwise qualified automatically due to their finish at the 2019 Championships, for the second Americas Zone slot for both men and women at the 2020 Championships. This was the seventh men's challenge and second women's challenge to be held, but the first men's and women's challenges to include Mexico. The winning team earned the second Americas Zone slot at the World Championships and the runner-up earned the one Americas Zone slot at the 2020 World Qualification Event, giving them another attempt to qualify for the Championships.

== Men ==
=== Teams ===
Country	Skip	Third	Second	Lead	Alternate
Brazil	Marcelo Mello	Michael Krahenbuhl	Scott McMullan	Filipe Nunes	Ricardo Losso
Mexico	Diego Tompkins	Ramy Cohen Masri	Ismael Abreu Saro	Mateo Tompkins	
United States	Greg Persinger (Fourth)	Rich Ruohonen (Skip)	Colin Hufman	Phil Tilker	Tyler George

=== Standings ===
Final Standings

Key
Team to 2020 World Men's Curling Championship
Team to 2020 World Qualification Event

Country	Skip	W	L
United States	Rich Ruohonen	4	0
Mexico	Diego Tompkins	2	2
Brazil	Marcelo Mello	0	4

=== Results ===
All draw times are listed in Central Standard Time (UTC−06:00).

==== Draw 1 ====
Thursday, November 28, 14:30

Sheet 2	1	2	3	4	5	6	7	8	9	10	Final
Mexico (Tompkins) 🔨	1	2	0	1	1	0	2	1	X	X	8
Brazil (Mello)	0	0	1	0	0	1	0	0	X	X	2

==== Draw 2 ====
Thursday, November 28, 19:30

Sheet 1	1	2	3	4	5	6	7	8	9	10	Final
United States (Ruohonen) 🔨	2	0	4	2	1	4	X	X	X	X	13
Brazil (Mello)	0	1	0	0	0	0	X	X	X	X	1

==== Draw 3 ====
Friday, November 29, 09:00

Sheet 2	1	2	3	4	5	6	7	8	9	10	Final
United States (Ruohonen) 🔨	3	1	4	2	3	0	X	X	X	X	13
Mexico (Tompkins)	0	0	0	0	0	1	X	X	X	X	1

==== Draw 4 ====
Friday, November 29, 14:00

Sheet 1	1	2	3	4	5	6	7	8	9	10	Final
Brazil (Mello)	0	0	0	1	0	0	1	0	0	X	2
Mexico (Tompkins) 🔨	0	1	1	0	1	1	0	3	0	X	7

==== Draw 5 ====
Friday, November 29, 19:00

Sheet 2	1	2	3	4	5	6	7	8	9	10	Final
Brazil (Mello)	0	1	0	0	1	0	1	0	0	X	3
United States (Ruohonen) 🔨	3	0	2	0	0	2	0	0	4	X	11

==== Draw 6 ====
Saturday, November 30, 10:00

Sheet 1	1	2	3	4	5	6	7	8	9	10	Final
Mexico (Tompkins)	0	0	0	2	1	0	0	2	0	X	5
United States (Ruohonen) 🔨	1	2	1	0	0	3	0	0	2	X	9

== Women ==
=== Teams ===
Country	Skip	Third	Second	Lead	Alternate
Brazil	Anne Shibuya	Luciana Barrella	Alessandra Barros	Isis Oliveira	
Mexico	Adriana Camarena Osorno	Angelica Perez Anzures	Estefana Quintero Torres	Monica Díez	
United States	Tabitha Peterson	Becca Hamilton	Tara Peterson	Aileen Geving	Natalie Nicholson

=== Standings ===
Final Standings

Key
Team to 2020 World Women's Curling Championship
Team to 2020 World Qualification Event

Country	Skip	W	L
United States	Tabitha Peterson	4	0
Mexico	Adriana Camarena Osorno	2	2
Brazil	Anne Shibuya	0	4

=== Results ===
All draw times are listed in Central Standard Time (UTC−06:00).

==== Draw 1 ====
Thursday, November 28, 14:30

Sheet 1	1	2	3	4	5	6	7	8	9	10	Final
Brazil (Shibuya)	0	0	2	1	0	1	2	0	0	0	6
Mexico (Camarena Osorno) 🔨	1	1	0	0	3	0	0	1	1	1	8

==== Draw 2 ====
Thursday, November 28, 19:30

Sheet 2	1	2	3	4	5	6	7	8	9	10	Final
Brazil (Shibuya)	0	1	0	1	1	0	1	0	0	X	4
United States (Peterson) 🔨	2	0	2	0	0	1	0	1	2	X	8

==== Draw 3 ====
Friday, November 29, 09:00

Sheet 1	1	2	3	4	5	6	7	8	9	10	Final
Mexico (Camarena Osorno) 🔨	1	0	0	2	0	0	0	X	X	X	3
United States (Peterson)	0	3	2	0	3	1	2	X	X	X	11

==== Draw 4 ====
Friday, November 29, 14:00

Sheet 2	1	2	3	4	5	6	7	8	9	10	Final
Mexico (Camarena Osorno)	1	2	0	2	1	2	0	0	0	0	8
Brazil (Shibuya) 🔨	0	0	1	0	0	0	2	2	1	1	7

==== Draw 5 ====
Friday, November 29, 19:00

Sheet 1	1	2	3	4	5	6	7	8	9	10	Final
United States (Peterson) 🔨	3	1	3	0	3	0	X	X	X	X	10
Brazil (Shibuya)	0	0	0	1	0	1	X	X	X	X	2

==== Draw 6 ====
Saturday, November 30, 10:00

Sheet 2	1	2	3	4	5	6	7	8	9	10	Final
United States (Peterson) 🔨	6	1	1	0	1	4	X	X	X	X	13
Mexico (Camarena Osorno)	0	0	0	1	0	0	X	X	X	X	1
