= 2018 Americas Challenge =

2018 Americas Challenge may refer to:

- 2018 Americas Challenge (January)
- 2018 Americas Challenge (November)
