= Anne Shibuya =

Brazilian curler

- Curler
- Born: Montes Claros, Minas Gerais, Brazil

Team
- Curling club: Royal City Curling Club; Vancouver, British Columbia
- Skip: Anne Shibuya
- Third: Luciana Barrella
- Second: Sarah Lippi
- Lead: Isabelle Campos
- Alternate: Marcelia Melo
- Mixed doubles partner: Ricardo Losso

Curling career
- Member Association: Brazil
- World Mixed Doubles Championship: 1 (2017)
- Pan Continental Championship: 1 (2023)
- Other appearances: World Mixed Curling Championship: 1 (2018)

Anne Shibuya Gervan (born in Montes Claros, Minas Gerais) is a Brazilian female curler. She currently plays as skip for the female national Brazilian team based in Vancouver, British Columbia. She is right-handed.

Anne Shibuya and Marcio Cerquinho played at the 2017 World Mixed Doubles Curling Championship.

== Teams ==
=== Women's ===
| Season | Skip | Third | Second | Lead | Alternate | Coach | Events |
|---|---|---|---|---|---|---|---|
| 2016–17 | Aline Gonçalves | Isis Oliveira | Alessandra Barros | Anne Shibuya | Luciana Barrella | Robbie Gallaugher | 2017 AC (silver) |
| 2018–19 | Anne Shibuya | Luciana Barrella | Alessandra Barros | Debora Monteiro | | Barbara Zbeetnoff | WQE 2019 (4th) |
| 2019–20 | Anne Shibuya | Luciana Barrella | Alessandra Barros | Isis Oliveira | | Barbara Zbeetnoff | 2019 AC (3rd) |
| 2020–21 | Anne Shibuya | Luciana Barrella | Debora Monteiro | Isabelle Campos | Samanta Yang | Barbara Zbeetnoff | |

=== Mixed ===
| Season | Skip | Third | Second | Lead | Coach | Events |
|---|---|---|---|---|---|---|
| 2018–19 | Anne Shibuya | Claudio Alves | Luciana Barrella | Erick Santos | Matthew Gervan | WMxCC 2018 (33rd) |

=== Mixed doubles ===
| Season | Female | Male | Coach | Events |
|---|---|---|---|---|
| 2016–17 | Anne Shibuya | Marcio Cerquinho | Karen Watson | BMDCC 2016 (gold); WMDCC 2017 (28th) |
| 2017–18 | Anne Shibuya | Claudio Alves | | BMDCC 2017 (5th) |

== Private life ==
Anne Shibuya is married to Matthew Gervan, a Canadian curler and coach. Gervan was the coach of the Brazilian team at the 2018 World Mixed Curling Championship. They reside in Vancouver, British Columbia, Canada.
