= Marcio Cerquinho =

Brazilian curler

- Curler
- Born: June 16, 1980 (age 46); Manaus, Amazonas, Brazil

Curling career
- Member Association: Brazil
- World Mixed Doubles Championship: 3 (2017, 2018, 2019)
- Other appearances: World Mixed Curling Championship: 1 (2016)

Marcio Leite Cerquinho (born June 16, 1980, in Manaus) is a former Brazilian curler and curling coach. In 2023, he pleaded guilty to two counts of sexual interference involving an 11-year-old girl, while living in New Westminster, British Columbia.

== Curling career ==
In 2017 and 2018, Cerquinho participated in the World Mixed Doubles Curling Championship, placing 28th in 2017 and 17th in 2018. In 2016 and 2017, he participated in the Brazilian Mixed Doubles Championship, where he took second place and first place on both occasions.

Cerquinho also participated in the 2018 Americas Challenge (January) where the Brazilian Curling Team played against Glenn Howard's in a best-of-five series that occurred parallel to the 2018 Continental Cup of Curling.

Cerquinho and his partner Aline Santos missed a spot in the playoffs of the 2018 World Mixed Doubles Curling Championship losing on the LSD (Last Stone Draw) to Finland by 2.48 cm.

Cerquinho and partner Luciana Barrella placed 26th at the 2019 World Mixed Doubles Curling Championship.

== Sexual interference crimes ==
When he was working as a curling coach, Cerquinho was charged in 2021 with child sex crimes for an incident in New Westminster, British Columbia. At the time, Cerquinho denied any wrongdoing. Cerquinho later pleaded guilty to two counts of sexual interference with an 11-year-old girl and two other victims.

== Teams ==
=== Men's ===
Season	Skip	Third	Second	Lead	Alternate	Coach	Events
2016–17	Marcelo Mello	Marcio Cerquinho	Scott McMullan	Filipe Nunes	Sérgio Mitsuo Vilela	Robbie Gallaugher	2017 AC (silver)
2017–18	Marcelo Mello	Scott McMullan	Marcio Cerquinho	Filipe Nunes	Sérgio Mitsuo Vilela		2018 AC(J) (silver)

=== Mixed ===
Season	Skip	Third	Second	Lead	Events
2016–17	Raphael Monticello	Alessandra Barros	Marcio Cerquinho	Luciana Barrella	WMxCC 2016 (33rd)

=== Mixed doubles ===
Season	Male	Female	Coach	Events
2016–17	Marcio Cerquinho	Anne Shibuya	Karen Watson	BMDCC 2016 (silver); WMDCC 2017 (28th)
2017–18	Marcio Cerquinho	Aline Lima (Gonçalves)	Wade Scoffin (WMDCC)	BMDCC 2017 (gold); WMDCC 2018 (17th)
2018–19	Marcio Cerquinho	Luciana Barrella	Wade Scoffin	WMDCC 2019 (26th)

== Record as a coach of national teams ==
Year	Tournament, event	National team	Place
2020	2020 Winter Youth Olympics	Brazil (mixed)	24
2020	2020 Winter Youth Olympics; NOR Nora Østgård / BRA Michael Velve	(mixed doubles)	25
2020	2020 Winter Youth Olympics; BRA Gabriela Rogic Farias / JPN Asei Nakahara	(mixed doubles)	25

== Personal life ==
Cerquinho is a Software developer. He was employed at the Vancouver Curling Club until October 2019.

He also built the first 3 sheet Curling Rink in Latin America, located in São Paulo in March 2020 called Arena Ice Brasil.
