= 2023 Pan Continental Curling Championships =

Annual curling tournament

- Host city: Kelowna, British Columbia, Canada
- Arena: Kelowna Curling Club
- Dates: October 29 – November 4
- Men's winner: Canada
- Curling club: St. John's CC, St. John's
- Skip: Brad Gushue
- Third: Mark Nichols
- Second: E. J. Harnden
- Lead: Geoff Walker
- Alternate: Jim Cotter
- Coach: Caleb Flaxey
- Finalist: South Korea (Park)
- Women's winner: South Korea
- Curling club: Uijeongbu CC, Uijeongbu
- Skip: Gim Eun-ji
- Third: Kim Min-ji
- Second: Kim Su-ji
- Lead: Seol Ye-eun
- Alternate: Seol Ye-ji
- Coach: Shin Dong-ho & Guy Hemmings
- Finalist: Japan (Fujisawa)

The 2023 Pan Continental Curling Championships were held from October 29 to November 4 at the Kelowna Curling Club in Kelowna, British Columbia. The event was used to qualify teams for the 2024 World Curling Championships. Both men's and women's events consisted of an A Division and B Division.

In the men's competition, the top five teams from the A Division (Canada, South Korea, Japan, the United States, New Zealand) secured qualification for the 2024 World Men's Curling Championship, which was held in Schaffhausen, Switzerland. Conversely, the team ranked lowest in the A Division (Guyana) was being relegated to the B Division in the following year. Additionally, the top finisher in the B Division (China) earned promotion to the A Division for the 2024 championship.

On the women's side, Canada automatically qualified as the host nation for the 2024 World Women's Curling Championship, which will be held in Sydney, Nova Scotia. Furthermore, the top four teams from the A Division (South Korea, Japan, the United States, New Zealand) also secured qualification for the championship. Similar to the men's division, the team with the lowest ranking in the A Division (Australia) faced relegation to the B Division for the subsequent year while the top finisher in the B Division (China) was promoted to the A Division for the 2024 championship.

On September 23, the Kazakh men's and women's team withdrew from the competition. Because the women's team had qualified for the A Division, the Mexican women's team took their place. The empty spot in the B Divisions was filled by the Philippines men's and women's teams who made their first-ever appearance at a World Curling Federation event.

== Issues ==
The event faced criticism from the Canadian men's skip, Brad Gushue, for being held in a curling club rather than on arena ice, for not being paid, lack of space for warming up, not being able to view practices, and for not being able wear thermal clothing to keep warm.

The event was broadcast live in Canada on TSN, for the first few days until it was pulled citing "production issues" (games were still shown on the TSN website).

== Medallists ==
A Division	Gold	Silver	Bronze
Men	Canada; Brad Gushue; Mark Nichols; E. J. Harnden; Geoff Walker; Jim Cotter	South Korea; Park Jong-duk; Jeong Yeong-seok; Oh Seung-hoon; Seong Ji-hoon; Lee Ki-bok	Japan; Riku Yanagisawa; Tsuyoshi Yamaguchi; Takeru Yamamoto; Satoshi Koizumi; Shingo Usui
Women	South Korea; Gim Eun-ji; Kim Min-ji; Kim Su-ji; Seol Ye-eun; Seol Ye-ji	Japan; Satsuki Fujisawa; Chinami Yoshida; Yumi Suzuki; Yurika Yoshida; Kotomi Ishizaki	United States; Tabitha Peterson; Cory Thiesse; Tara Peterson; Becca Hamilton; Vicky Persinger

== Men ==
=== A division ===
==== Qualification ====
The following nations qualified to participate in the 2023 Pan Continental Curling Championship A Division:

Event	Vacancies	Qualified
2022 Pan Continental Curling Championships A Division	7	Canada; South Korea; United States; Japan; New Zealand; Chinese Taipei; Australia
2022 Pan Continental Curling Championships B Division	1	Guyana
TOTAL	8	

==== Teams ====
The teams are listed as follows:

Australia	Canada	Chinese Taipei	Guyana
Fourth: Dean Hewitt; Skip: Jay Merchant; Second: Tanner Davis; Lead: Justin Grundy; Alternate: Thomas Bence	Skip: Brad Gushue; Third: Mark Nichols; Second: E. J. Harnden; Lead: Geoff Walker; Alternate: Jim Cotter	Skip: Randolph Shen; Third: Nicholas Hsu; Second: Brendon Liu; Lead: Ting-Li Lin; Alternate: Naihung Wang	Skip: Rayad Husain; Third: Baul Persaud; Second: Darryl Narain; Lead: Khemraj Goberdhan
Japan	New Zealand	South Korea	United States
Skip: Riku Yanagisawa; Third: Tsuyoshi Yamaguchi; Second: Takeru Yamamoto; Lead: Satoshi Koizumi; Alternate: Shingo Usui	Skip: Anton Hood; Third: Ben Smith; Second: Brett Sargon; Lead: Hunter Walker; Alternate: Peter de Boer	Skip: Park Jong-duk; Third: Jeong Yeong-seok; Second: Oh Seung-hoon; Lead: Seong Ji-hoon; Alternate: Lee Ki-bok	Fourth: Korey Dropkin; Skip: Andrew Stopera; Second: Mark Fenner; Lead: Thomas Howell; Alternate: Ben Richardson

==== Round robin standings ====
Final Round Robin Standings

Key
Teams to Playoffs and Qualified for the 2024 World Men's Curling Championship
Team Qualified for the 2024 World Men's Curling Championship
Team Relegated to 2024 B Division

Country	Skip	W	L	W–L	PF	PA	EW	EL	BE	SE	S%	DSC
Canada	Brad Gushue	6	1	1–0	54	24	32	18	3	12	87.7%	21.03
Japan	Riku Yanagisawa	6	1	0–1	55	27	27	19	5	6	87.2%	11.98
South Korea	Park Jong-duk	5	2	–	50	42	29	29	3	4	81.0%	72.74
United States	Andrew Stopera	4	3	1–0	52	26	27	18	7	12	86.0%	39.66
New Zealand	Anton Hood	4	3	0–1	45	36	24	24	8	6	78.3%	29.88
Australia	Jay Merchant	2	5	–	40	52	27	31	1	4	76.1%	37.28
Chinese Taipei	Randolph Shen	1	6	–	26	56	19	28	2	4	71.5%	100.94
Guyana	Rayad Husain	0	7	–	15	74	15	33	2	2	55.9%	89.83

Round Robin Summary Table
Pos.	Country	Australia	Canada	Chinese Taipei	Guyana	Japan	New Zealand	South Korea	United States	Record
6	Australia	—	4–9	6–3	9–4	6–11	6–8	6–9	3–8	2–5
1	Canada	9–4	—	8–1	11–1	6–3	8–2	5–8	7–5	6–1
7	Chinese Taipei	3–6	1–8	—	9–3	2–12	3–10	6–9	2–8	1–6
8	Guyana	4–9	1–11	3–9	—	2–9	1–11	4–6	0–19	0–7
2	Japan	11–6	3–6	12–2	9–2	—	6–4	10–5	4–2	6–1
5	New Zealand	8–6	2–8	10–3	11–1	4–6	—	8–5	2–7	4–3
3	South Korea	9–6	8–5	9–6	6–4	5–10	5–8	—	8–3	5–2
4	United States	8–3	5–7	8–2	19–0	2–4	7–2	3–8	—	4–3

==== Round robin results ====
All draw times are listed in Pacific Time (UTC−07:00).

===== Draw 1 =====
Sunday, October 29, 13:30

Sheet A	1	2	3	4	5	6	7	8	9	10	Final
Japan (Yanagisawa) 🔨	3	0	2	3	0	4	X	X	X	X	12
Chinese Taipei (Shen)	0	1	0	0	1	0	X	X	X	X	2

Sheet B	1	2	3	4	5	6	7	8	9	10	Final
Guyana (Husain) 🔨	0	0	0	0	0	0	X	X	X	X	0
United States (Stopera)	3	5	3	3	2	3	X	X	X	X	19

Sheet C	1	2	3	4	5	6	7	8	9	10	Final
Canada (Gushue) 🔨	1	0	1	0	0	1	0	2	0	0	5
South Korea (Park)	0	1	0	2	2	0	1	0	1	1	8

Sheet D	1	2	3	4	5	6	7	8	9	10	Final
New Zealand (Hood) 🔨	1	0	3	1	0	1	0	1	0	1	8
Australia (Merchant)	0	1	0	0	2	0	1	0	2	0	6

===== Draw 2 =====
Monday, October 30, 9:00

Sheet A	1	2	3	4	5	6	7	8	9	10	Final
South Korea (Park)	0	1	0	1	0	4	0	2	0	1	9
Australia (Merchant) 🔨	1	0	1	0	2	0	1	0	1	0	6

Sheet B	1	2	3	4	5	6	7	8	9	10	Final
Canada (Gushue) 🔨	1	0	2	1	2	0	2	X	X	X	8
New Zealand (Hood)	0	2	0	0	0	0	0	X	X	X	2

Sheet C	1	2	3	4	5	6	7	8	9	10	Final
Chinese Taipei (Shen)	0	1	0	0	1	0	0	0	X	X	2
United States (Stopera) 🔨	2	0	0	2	0	0	0	4	X	X	8

Sheet D	1	2	3	4	5	6	7	8	9	10	Final
Japan (Yanagisawa) 🔨	1	1	0	2	0	3	2	X	X	X	9
Guyana (Husain)	0	0	1	0	1	0	0	X	X	X	2

===== Draw 3 =====
Monday, October 30, 19:00

Sheet A	1	2	3	4	5	6	7	8	9	10	11	Final
Canada (Gushue) 🔨	2	0	1	0	1	0	0	0	1	0	2	7
United States (Stopera)	0	0	0	1	0	2	0	1	0	1	0	5

Sheet B	1	2	3	4	5	6	7	8	9	10	Final
Japan (Yanagisawa) 🔨	4	0	2	0	2	0	1	2	X	X	11
Australia (Merchant)	0	1	0	4	0	1	0	0	X	X	6

Sheet C	1	2	3	4	5	6	7	8	9	10	Final
New Zealand (Hood) 🔨	3	1	2	0	2	3	X	X	X	X	11
Guyana (Husain)	0	0	0	1	0	0	X	X	X	X	1

Sheet D	1	2	3	4	5	6	7	8	9	10	Final
Chinese Taipei (Shen)	0	1	0	1	0	2	0	2	0	X	6
South Korea (Park) 🔨	0	0	4	0	2	0	2	0	1	X	9

===== Draw 4 =====
Tuesday, October 31, 14:00

Sheet A	1	2	3	4	5	6	7	8	9	10	Final
Guyana (Husain)	0	1	0	1	0	1	0	0	1	0	4
South Korea (Park) 🔨	2	0	0	0	2	0	1	0	0	1	6

Sheet B	1	2	3	4	5	6	7	8	9	10	Final
New Zealand (Hood) 🔨	4	4	0	0	2	0	X	X	X	X	10
Chinese Taipei (Shen)	0	0	1	1	0	1	X	X	X	X	3

Sheet C	1	2	3	4	5	6	7	8	9	10	Final
Japan (Yanagisawa) 🔨	0	0	2	0	0	0	0	1	0	X	3
Canada (Gushue)	1	0	0	0	2	0	1	0	2	X	6

Sheet D	1	2	3	4	5	6	7	8	9	10	Final
Australia (Merchant) 🔨	0	1	0	0	0	2	0	0	X	X	3
United States (Stopera)	2	0	2	0	2	0	0	2	X	X	8

===== Draw 5 =====
Wednesday, November 1, 9:00

Sheet A	1	2	3	4	5	6	7	8	9	10	Final
New Zealand (Hood)	0	0	1	0	0	0	2	0	1	X	4
Japan (Yanagisawa) 🔨	2	0	0	2	0	0	0	2	0	X	6

Sheet B	1	2	3	4	5	6	7	8	9	10	Final
United States (Stopera)	0	1	0	1	0	0	1	0	X	X	3
South Korea (Park) 🔨	0	0	2	0	2	2	0	2	X	X	8

Sheet C	1	2	3	4	5	6	7	8	9	10	Final
Guyana (Husain) 🔨	1	0	1	0	0	1	1	0	X	X	4
Australia (Merchant)	0	2	0	3	2	0	0	2	X	X	9

Sheet D	1	2	3	4	5	6	7	8	9	10	Final
Canada (Gushue) 🔨	2	1	0	2	1	2	X	X	X	X	8
Chinese Taipei (Shen)	0	0	1	0	0	0	X	X	X	X	1

===== Draw 6 =====
Wednesday, November 1, 19:00

Sheet A	1	2	3	4	5	6	7	8	9	10	Final
Chinese Taipei (Shen)	0	3	0	1	1	0	3	1	X	X	9
Guyana (Husain) 🔨	1	0	1	0	0	1	0	0	X	X	3

Sheet B	1	2	3	4	5	6	7	8	9	10	Final
Australia (Merchant)	0	2	0	0	1	0	0	1	0	X	4
Canada (Gushue) 🔨	2	0	2	2	0	0	1	0	2	X	9

Sheet C	1	2	3	4	5	6	7	8	9	10	Final
United States (Stopera) 🔨	0	0	1	0	1	0	0	0	0	0	2
Japan (Yanagisawa)	0	0	0	2	0	0	0	0	1	1	4

Sheet D	1	2	3	4	5	6	7	8	9	10	Final
South Korea (Park)	0	0	2	1	0	0	2	0	0	0	5
New Zealand (Hood) 🔨	0	3	0	0	0	2	0	0	2	1	8

===== Draw 7 =====
Wednesday, November 2, 14:00

Sheet A	1	2	3	4	5	6	7	8	9	10	Final
United States (Stopera) 🔨	1	0	1	3	0	1	0	1	X	X	7
New Zealand (Hood)	0	0	0	0	1	0	1	0	X	X	2

Sheet B	1	2	3	4	5	6	7	8	9	10	Final
South Korea (Park)	0	1	0	1	0	0	3	0	X	X	5
Japan (Yanagisawa) 🔨	2	0	1	0	2	1	0	4	X	X	10

Sheet C	1	2	3	4	5	6	7	8	9	10	Final
Australia (Merchant) 🔨	1	1	0	1	0	1	1	0	0	1	6
Chinese Taipei (Shen)	0	0	0	0	1	0	0	0	2	0	3

Sheet D	1	2	3	4	5	6	7	8	9	10	Final
Guyana (Husain)	0	0	0	0	1	0	X	X	X	X	1
Canada (Gushue) 🔨	3	0	3	1	0	4	X	X	X	X	11

==== Playoffs ====
Semifinals
1	Canada	8
4	United States	3
2	Japan	7
3	South Korea	8

Gold medal game
1	Canada	8
3	South Korea	3
Bronze medal game
4	United States	6
2	Japan	9

===== Semifinals =====
Friday, November 3, 9:00

Sheet B	1	2	3	4	5	6	7	8	9	10	Final
Canada (Gushue) 🔨	0	1	0	1	0	0	1	0	3	2	8
United States (Stopera)	0	0	1	0	0	1	0	1	0	0	3

Player percentages
Canada		United States	
Geoff Walker	91%	Thomas Howell	93%
E. J. Harnden	80%	Mark Fenner	90%
Mark Nichols	90%	Andrew Stopera	88%
Brad Gushue	91%	Korey Dropkin	86%
Total	88%	Total	89%

Sheet D	1	2	3	4	5	6	7	8	9	10	Final
Japan (Yanagisawa) 🔨	2	0	1	0	1	0	1	0	2	0	7
South Korea (Park)	0	2	0	1	0	1	0	3	0	1	8

Player percentages
Japan		South Korea	
Satoshi Koizumi	71%	Seong Ji-hoon	88%
Takeru Yamamoto	83%	Oh Seung-hoon	79%
Tsuyoshi Yamaguchi	91%	Jeong Yeong-seok	90%
Riku Yanagisawa	74%	Park Jong-duk	81%
Total	80%	Total	84%

===== Bronze medal game =====
Friday, November 3, 19:00

Sheet C	1	2	3	4	5	6	7	8	9	10	Final
United States (Stopera)	0	0	2	1	0	1	0	2	0	X	6
Japan (Yanagisawa) 🔨	2	2	0	0	2	0	2	0	1	X	9

Player percentages
United States		Japan	
Thomas Howell	95%	Satoshi Koizumi	75%
Mark Fenner	88%	Takeru Yamamoto	91%
Andrew Stopera	79%	Tsuyoshi Yamaguchi	91%
Korey Dropkin	84%	Riku Yanagisawa	90%
Total	86%	Total	87%

===== Gold medal game =====
Saturday, November 4, 15:00

Sheet C	1	2	3	4	5	6	7	8	9	10	Final
Canada (Gushue) 🔨	0	1	0	0	1	2	2	0	2	X	8
South Korea (Park)	0	0	2	0	0	0	0	1	0	X	3

Player percentages
Canada		South Korea	
Geoff Walker	99%	Seong Ji-hoon	94%
E. J. Harnden	88%	Oh Seung-hoon	86%
Mark Nichols	86%	Jeong Yeong-seok	76%
Brad Gushue	87%	Park Jong-duk	79%
Total	90%	Total	84%

==== Player percentages ====
Round robin only

Leads	%
(United States) Thomas Howell	92.4
(Japan) Satoshi Koizumi	91.5
(Canada) Geoff Walker	91.4
(Australia) Justin Grundy	85.6
(New Zealand) Hunter Walker	82.9

Seconds	%
(Japan) Takeru Yamamoto	88.8
(Canada) E. J. Harnden	84.5
(United States) Mark Fenner	80.5
(New Zealand) Brett Sargon	80.3
(South Korea) Oh Seung-hoon	75.0

Thirds	%
(Canada) Mark Nichols	87.6
(United States) Andrew Stopera (Skip)	86.4
(Japan) Tsuyoshi Yamaguchi	85.6
(South Korea) Jeong Yeong-seok	80.5
(New Zealand) Ben Smith	75.0

Skips	%
(Canada) Brad Gushue	87.8
(South Korea) Park Jong-duk	84.9
(United States) Korey Dropkin (Fourth)	84.6
(Japan) Riku Yanagisawa	82.5
(Australia) Dean Hewitt (Fourth)	79.0

==== Final standings ====
Key
Teams Advance to the 2024 World Men's Curling Championship
Team Relegated to 2024 B Division

Place	Team
1st place, gold medalist(s)	Canada
2nd place, silver medalist(s)	South Korea
3rd place, bronze medalist(s)	Japan
4	United States
5	New Zealand
6	Australia
7	Chinese Taipei
8	Guyana

=== B division ===
==== Teams ====
The teams are listed as follows:

Brazil	China	Hong Kong	India
Skip: Márcio Rodrigues; Third: Vítor Melo; Second: Kyron Suhan; Lead: Nuno Rodrigues; Alternate: Marcelo Mello	Skip: Ma Xiuyue; Third: Zou Qiang; Second: Wang Zhiyu; Lead: Tian Jiafeng; Alternate: Li Zhichao	Skip: Jason Chang; Third: Martin Yan; Second: Ching Nam Cheng; Lead: Cheuk Hei Chung; Alternate: Chi Lap Ma	Skip: P. N. Raju; Third: Girithar Anthay Suthakaran; Second: Kishan Vasant; Lead: Vinay Goenka; Alternate: Sudheer Reddy
Kenya	Mexico	Philippines	Saudi Arabia
Skip: Oliver Echenje; Third: Simon Karanja; Second: Daniel Odhiambo; Lead: Joseph Kabochi; Alternate: Evans Kinoti	Skip: Diego Tompkins; Third: Ismael Abreu; Second: Chris Barajas; Lead: Mateo Tompkins	Skip: Marc Pfister; Third: Christian Haller; Second: Enrico Pfister; Lead: Alan Frei; Alternate: Benjo Delarmente	Skip: Amar Masalmeh; Third: Hussain Hagawi; Second: Mohammed Aldaraan; Lead: Suleiman Alaqel; Alternate: Mohammad Alyuzbashi

==== Round robin standings ====
Final Round Robin Standings

Key
Teams to Playoffs

Country	Skip	W	L	W–L	DSC
China	Ma Xiuyue	7	0	–	28.30
Philippines	Marc Pfister	6	1	–	33.99
Hong Kong	Jason Chang	5	2	–	89.19
Mexico	Diego Tompkins	4	3	–	57.79
India	P. N. Raju	3	4	–	73.83
Saudi Arabia	Amar Masalmeh	2	5	–	161.31
Brazil	Márcio Rodrigues	1	6	–	98.14
Kenya	Oliver Echenje	0	7	–	154.61

Round Robin Summary Table
Pos.	Country	Brazil	China	Hong Kong	India	Kenya	Mexico	Philippines	Saudi Arabia	Record
7	Brazil	—	3–9	4–13	2–9	16–2	1–12	2–11	7–12	1–6
1	China	9–3	—	13–3	11–3	14–1	10–4	9–4	8–2	7–0
3	Hong Kong	13–4	3–13	—	8–6	11–2	6–3	5–12	11–8	5–2
5	India	9–2	3–11	6–8	—	11–0	1–12	5–12	11–3	3–4
8	Kenya	2–16	1–14	2–11	0–11	—	2–16	1–16	4–18	0–7
4	Mexico	12–1	4–10	3–6	12–1	16–2	—	4–12	6–4	4–3
2	Philippines	11–2	4–9	12–5	12–5	16–1	12–4	—	16–0	6–1
6	Saudi Arabia	12–7	2–8	8–11	3–11	18–4	4–6	0–16	—	2–5

==== Round robin results ====
All draw times are listed in Pacific Time (UTC−07:00).

===== Draw 1 =====
Sunday, October 29, 13:30

Sheet E	1	2	3	4	5	6	7	8	9	10	Final
India (Raju)	0	1	1	0	0	0	2	4	1	X	9
Brazil (Rodrigues) 🔨	0	0	0	0	1	1	0	0	0	X	2

Sheet F	1	2	3	4	5	6	7	8	9	10	Final
Mexico (Tompkins)	0	1	0	2	0	0	1	0	X	X	4
Philippines (Pfister) 🔨	1	0	3	0	4	1	0	3	X	X	12

Sheet G	1	2	3	4	5	6	7	8	9	10	Final
Saudi Arabia (Masalmeh) 🔨	4	0	5	0	6	2	1	X	X	X	18
Kenya (Echenje)	0	2	0	2	0	0	0	X	X	X	4

Sheet H	1	2	3	4	5	6	7	8	9	10	Final
China (Ma) 🔨	3	0	2	0	1	3	2	2	X	X	13
Hong Kong (Chang)	0	2	0	1	0	0	0	0	X	X	3

===== Draw 2 =====
Monday, October 30, 9:00

Sheet E	1	2	3	4	5	6	7	8	9	10	Final
Kenya (Echenje)	0	0	0	1	0	0	0	X	X	X	1
China (Ma) 🔨	2	2	5	0	2	1	2	X	X	X	14

Sheet F	1	2	3	4	5	6	7	8	9	10	Final
Saudi Arabia (Masalmeh) 🔨	3	0	0	1	0	1	1	1	1	X	8
Hong Kong (Chang)	0	2	2	0	7	0	0	0	0	X	11

Sheet G	1	2	3	4	5	6	7	8	9	10	Final
Philippines (Pfister) 🔨	2	0	5	0	2	0	0	0	3	X	12
India (Raju)	0	1	0	1	0	1	1	1	0	X	5

Sheet H	1	2	3	4	5	6	7	8	9	10	Final
Mexico (Tompkins)	0	0	0	3	2	1	6	X	X	X	12
Brazil (Rodrigues) 🔨	0	0	1	0	0	0	0	X	X	X	1

===== Draw 3 =====
Monday, October 30, 19:00

Sheet E	1	2	3	4	5	6	7	8	9	10	Final
Hong Kong (Chang)	0	3	0	0	1	0	0	1	X	X	5
Philippines (Pfister) 🔨	2	0	3	1	0	2	4	0	X	X	12

Sheet F	1	2	3	4	5	6	7	8	9	10	Final
China (Ma)	1	1	2	0	3	0	1	0	2	X	10
Mexico (Tompkins) 🔨	0	0	0	1	0	2	0	1	0	X	4

Sheet G	1	2	3	4	5	6	7	8	9	10	Final
Brazil (Rodrigues)	0	1	0	0	2	0	0	2	2	X	7
Saudi Arabia (Masalmeh) 🔨	3	0	3	3	0	1	2	0	0	X	12

Sheet H	1	2	3	4	5	6	7	8	9	10	Final
India (Raju)	3	1	1	2	2	2	X	X	X	X	11
Kenya (Echenje) 🔨	0	0	0	0	0	0	X	X	X	X	0

===== Draw 4 =====
Tuesday, October 31, 14:00

Sheet E	1	2	3	4	5	6	7	8	9	10	Final
Saudi Arabia (Masalmeh)	0	1	0	1	0	1	0	0	0	X	3
India (Raju) 🔨	0	0	1	0	2	0	2	4	2	X	11

Sheet F	1	2	3	4	5	6	7	8	9	10	Final
Kenya (Echenje)	0	0	2	0	0	0	X	X	X	X	2
Brazil (Rodrigues) 🔨	7	1	0	4	1	3	X	X	X	X	16

Sheet G	1	2	3	4	5	6	7	8	9	10	Final
Mexico (Tompkins)	0	0	1	0	0	0	0	1	1	X	3
Hong Kong (Chang) 🔨	1	0	0	1	1	2	1	0	0	X	6

Sheet H	1	2	3	4	5	6	7	8	9	10	Final
Philippines (Pfister) 🔨	0	1	0	1	0	0	0	2	0	X	4
China (Ma)	0	0	2	0	1	1	4	0	1	X	9

===== Draw 5 =====
Wednesday, November 1, 9:00

Sheet E	1	2	3	4	5	6	7	8	9	10	Final
Brazil (Rodrigues)	0	0	0	0	0	3	1	0	X	X	4
Hong Kong (Chang) 🔨	1	1	3	2	2	0	0	4	X	X	13

Sheet F	1	2	3	4	5	6	7	8	9	10	Final
India (Raju)	0	0	1	0	0	2	0	0	X	X	3
China (Ma) 🔨	3	3	0	0	3	0	1	1	X	X	11

Sheet G	1	2	3	4	5	6	7	8	9	10	Final
Kenya (Echenje)	1	0	0	0	0	0	X	X	X	X	1
Philippines (Pfister) 🔨	0	4	4	1	2	5	X	X	X	X	16

Sheet H	1	2	3	4	5	6	7	8	9	10	Final
Saudi Arabia (Masalmeh)	0	1	0	1	0	1	0	1	0	0	4
Mexico (Tompkins) 🔨	1	0	0	0	1	0	1	0	1	2	6

===== Draw 6 =====
Wednesday, November 1, 19:00

Sheet E	1	2	3	4	5	6	7	8	9	10	Final
Mexico (Tompkins) 🔨	3	0	3	5	2	0	0	3	X	X	16
Kenya (Echenje)	0	1	0	0	0	1	0	0	X	X	2

Sheet F	1	2	3	4	5	6	7	8	9	10	Final
Philippines (Pfister) 🔨	4	2	4	1	3	2	X	X	X	X	16
Saudi Arabia (Masalmeh)	0	0	0	0	0	0	X	X	X	X	0

Sheet G	1	2	3	4	5	6	7	8	9	10	Final
China (Ma) 🔨	2	1	0	3	0	3	0	X	X	X	9
Brazil (Rodrigues)	0	0	1	0	1	0	1	X	X	X	3

Sheet H	1	2	3	4	5	6	7	8	9	10	Final
Hong Kong (Chang)	0	1	0	2	0	2	0	2	0	1	8
India (Raju) 🔨	0	0	2	0	0	0	4	0	0	0	6

===== Draw 7 =====
Thursday, November 2, 14:00

Sheet E	1	2	3	4	5	6	7	8	9	10	Final
China (Ma) 🔨	3	1	1	0	3	0	X	X	X	X	8
Saudi Arabia (Masalmeh)	0	0	0	1	0	1	X	X	X	X	2

Sheet F	1	2	3	4	5	6	7	8	9	10	Final
Hong Kong (Chang)	1	4	0	3	0	3	X	X	X	X	11
Kenya (Echenje) 🔨	0	0	1	0	1	0	X	X	X	X	2

Sheet G	1	2	3	4	5	6	7	8	9	10	Final
India (Raju) 🔨	0	0	0	0	0	1	X	X	X	X	1
Mexico (Tompkins)	2	1	5	1	3	0	X	X	X	X	12

Sheet H	1	2	3	4	5	6	7	8	9	10	Final
Brazil (Rodrigues)	0	0	0	1	0	1	X	X	X	X	2
Philippines (Pfister) 🔨	4	2	2	0	3	0	X	X	X	X	11

==== Playoffs ====
Semifinals
1	China	7
4	Mexico	1
2	Philippines	9
3	Hong Kong	5

Gold medal game
1	China	8
2	Philippines	4
Bronze medal game
4	Mexico	7
3	Hong Kong	10

===== Semifinals =====
Friday, November 3, 19:00

Sheet E	1	2	3	4	5	6	7	8	9	10	Final
Philippines (Pfister) 🔨	2	0	1	0	2	0	2	0	2	X	9
Hong Kong (Chang)	0	2	0	0	0	1	0	2	0	X	5

Sheet G	1	2	3	4	5	6	7	8	9	10	Final
China (Ma) 🔨	2	0	2	0	0	3	0	0	X	X	7
Mexico (Tompkins)	0	0	0	1	0	0	0	0	X	X	1

===== Bronze medal game =====
Saturday, November 4, 10:00

Sheet H	1	2	3	4	5	6	7	8	9	10	Final
Mexico (Tompkins)	0	1	0	2	0	2	0	1	1	X	7
Hong Kong (Chang) 🔨	2	0	4	0	2	0	2	0	0	X	10

===== Gold medal game =====
Saturday, November 4, 10:00

Sheet F	1	2	3	4	5	6	7	8	9	10	Final
China (Ma) 🔨	0	2	0	1	0	1	0	2	0	2	8
Philippines (Pfister)	0	0	0	0	3	0	1	0	0	0	4

==== Final standings ====
Key
Team Promoted to 2024 A Division

Place	Team
1st place, gold medalist(s)	China
2nd place, silver medalist(s)	Philippines
3rd place, bronze medalist(s)	Hong Kong
4	Mexico
5	India
6	Saudi Arabia
7	Brazil
8	Kenya

== Women ==
=== A division ===
==== Qualification ====
The following nations qualified to participate in the 2023 Pan Continental Curling Championship A Division. After the withdrawal of the Kazakh Women's Team due to travel complications, Mexico, the runner-up of the 2022 Pan Continental Curling Championships B Division, was promoted to A Division.

Event	Vacancies	Qualified
2022 Pan Continental Curling Championships A Division	~~7~~ 6	Japan; South Korea; Canada; United States; New Zealand; Australia; ~~Kazakhstan~~
2022 Pan Continental Curling Championships B Division	~~1~~ 2	Chinese Taipei; Mexico
TOTAL	8	

==== Teams ====
The teams are listed as follows:

Australia	Canada	Chinese Taipei	Japan
Skip: Jennifer Westhagen; Third: Sara Westman; Second: Kristen Tsourlenes; Lead: Carlee Millikin; Alternate: Helen Williams	Skip: Kerri Einarson; Third: Val Sweeting; Second: Shannon Birchard; Lead: Briane Harris; Alternate: Dawn McEwen	Skip: Cynthia Lu; Third: Amanda Chou; Second: Heidi Lin; Lead: Sharyin Huang; Alternate: Jennifer Ying	Skip: Satsuki Fujisawa; Third: Chinami Yoshida; Second: Yumi Suzuki; Lead: Yurika Yoshida; Alternate: Kotomi Ishizaki
Mexico	New Zealand	South Korea	United States
Skip: Adriana Camarena; Third: Estefana Quintero; Second: Veronica Huerta; Lead: Karla Martínez	Skip: Jessica Smith; Third: Courtney Smith; Second: Bridget Becker; Lead: Natalie Thurlow; Alternate: Holly Thompson	Skip: Gim Eun-ji; Third: Kim Min-ji; Second: Kim Su-ji; Lead: Seol Ye-eun; Alternate: Seol Ye-ji	Skip: Tabitha Peterson; Third: Cory Thiesse; Second: Tara Peterson; Lead: Becca Hamilton; Alternate: Vicky Persinger

==== Round robin standings ====
Final Round Robin Standings

Key
Teams to Playoffs and Qualified for the 2024 World Women's Curling Championship
Team Qualified for the 2024 World Women's Curling Championship
Team Relegated to 2024 B Division

Country	Skip	W	L	W–L	PF	PA	EW	EL	BE	SE	S%	DSC
South Korea	Gim Eun-ji	6	1	1–1	69	27	32	17	4	12	82.8%	23.15
Japan	Satsuki Fujisawa	6	1	1–1	58	28	32	15	4	13	80.9%	24.36
United States	Tabitha Peterson	6	1	1–1	57	32	32	26	2	10	83.6%	38.81
Canada	Kerri Einarson	4	3	–	65	35	31	24	3	11	83.1%	57.51
New Zealand	Jessica Smith	2	5	1–0	40	62	23	32	1	4	65.5%	57.92
Chinese Taipei	Cynthia Lu	2	5	0–1	28	59	22	30	2	8	58.4%	61.37
Mexico	Adriana Camarena	1	6	1–0	22	71	17	34	1	2	58.4%	89.58
Australia	Jennifer Westhagen	1	6	0–1	35	60	24	35	2	5	67.7%	51.22

Round Robin Summary Table
Pos.	Country	Australia	Canada	Chinese Taipei	Japan	Mexico	New Zealand	South Korea	United States	Record
8	Australia	—	5–9	4–7	4–10	7–8	9–7	2–9	4–10	1–6
4	Canada	9–5	—	9–2	7–10	17–1	10–1	8–9	5–7	4–3
6	Chinese Taipei	7–4	2–9	—	1–10	6–5	7–11	3–10	2–10	2–5
2	Japan	10–4	10–7	10–1	—	9–1	9–4	2–8	8–3	6–1
7	Mexico	8–7	1–17	5–6	1–9	—	4–12	1–10	2–10	1–6
5	New Zealand	7–9	1–10	11–7	4–9	12–4	—	2–15	3–8	2–5
1	South Korea	9–2	9–8	10–3	8–2	10–1	15–2	—	8–9	6–1
3	United States	10–4	7–5	10–2	3–8	10–2	8–3	9–8	—	6–1

==== Round-robin results ====
All draw times are listed in Pacific Time (UTC−07:00).

===== Draw 1 =====
Sunday, October 29, 8:30

Sheet A	1	2	3	4	5	6	7	8	9	10	Final
Mexico (Camarena)	0	0	1	0	0	0	X	X	X	X	1
South Korea (Gim) 🔨	2	1	0	3	2	2	X	X	X	X	10

Sheet B	1	2	3	4	5	6	7	8	9	10	Final
Chinese Taipei (Lu) 🔨	0	1	0	0	0	1	0	X	X	X	2
Canada (Einarson)	1	0	1	2	3	0	2	X	X	X	9

Sheet C	1	2	3	4	5	6	7	8	9	10	Final
New Zealand (Smith)	0	0	2	0	0	1	0	1	X	X	4
Japan (Fujisawa) 🔨	2	1	0	3	0	0	3	0	X	X	9

Sheet D	1	2	3	4	5	6	7	8	9	10	Final
Australia (Westhagen)	0	0	0	1	0	1	0	2	0	X	4
United States (Peterson) 🔨	0	1	2	0	3	0	1	0	3	X	10

===== Draw 2 =====
Sunday, October 29, 19:30

Sheet A	1	2	3	4	5	6	7	8	9	10	Final
Canada (Einarson)	0	0	2	0	0	3	0	0	2	0	7
Japan (Fujisawa) 🔨	1	0	0	1	2	0	2	2	0	2	10

Sheet B	1	2	3	4	5	6	7	8	9	10	11	Final
Australia (Westhagen) 🔨	1	2	0	0	0	1	0	2	0	1	0	7
Mexico (Camarena)	0	0	2	0	2	0	2	0	1	0	1	8

Sheet C	1	2	3	4	5	6	7	8	9	10	Final
United States (Peterson) 🔨	0	0	1	3	1	0	2	3	X	X	10
Chinese Taipei (Lu)	0	1	0	0	0	1	0	0	X	X	2

Sheet D	1	2	3	4	5	6	7	8	9	10	Final
South Korea (Gim) 🔨	2	3	0	4	3	3	X	X	X	X	15
New Zealand (Smith)	0	0	2	0	0	0	X	X	X	X	2

===== Draw 3 =====
Monday October 30, 14:00

Sheet A	1	2	3	4	5	6	7	8	9	10	Final
Chinese Taipei (Lu) 🔨	2	0	2	0	2	0	1	0	0	X	7
New Zealand (Smith)	0	2	0	4	0	1	0	3	1	X	11

Sheet B	1	2	3	4	5	6	7	8	9	10	11	Final
United States (Peterson)	0	1	2	0	0	0	2	0	3	0	1	9
South Korea (Gim) 🔨	1	0	0	1	1	1	0	1	0	3	0	8

Sheet C	1	2	3	4	5	6	7	8	9	10	Final
Japan (Fujisawa) 🔨	0	2	1	0	3	3	X	X	X	X	9
Mexico (Camarena)	0	0	0	1	0	0	X	X	X	X	1

Sheet D	1	2	3	4	5	6	7	8	9	10	Final
Canada (Einarson)	0	1	0	3	0	2	0	2	1	X	9
Australia (Westhagen) 🔨	2	0	1	0	1	0	1	0	0	X	5

===== Draw 4 =====
Tuesday, October 31, 9:00

Sheet A	1	2	3	4	5	6	7	8	9	10	Final
United States (Peterson) 🔨	2	0	1	0	4	0	3	X	X	X	10
Mexico (Camarena)	0	0	0	1	0	1	0	X	X	X	2

Sheet B	1	2	3	4	5	6	7	8	9	10	Final
Canada (Einarson) 🔨	2	0	2	1	3	2	X	X	X	X	10
New Zealand (Smith)	0	1	0	0	0	0	X	X	X	X	1

Sheet C	1	2	3	4	5	6	7	8	9	10	Final
South Korea (Gim) 🔨	0	3	0	1	0	1	0	2	2	X	9
Australia (Westhagen)	0	0	1	0	1	0	0	0	0	X	2

Sheet D	1	2	3	4	5	6	7	8	9	10	Final
Japan (Fujisawa) 🔨	2	1	0	1	0	2	4	X	X	X	10
Chinese Taipei (Lu)	0	0	0	0	1	0	0	X	X	X	1

===== Draw 5 =====
Tuesday, October 31, 19:00

Sheet A	1	2	3	4	5	6	7	8	9	10	Final
Australia (Westhagen)	2	0	1	0	0	0	1	0	0	0	4
Chinese Taipei (Lu) 🔨	0	0	0	1	1	1	0	2	1	1	7

Sheet B	1	2	3	4	5	6	7	8	9	10	Final
South Korea (Gim)	0	2	0	0	0	3	3	X	X	X	8
Japan (Fujisawa) 🔨	1	0	1	0	0	0	0	X	X	X	2

Sheet C	1	2	3	4	5	6	7	8	9	10	Final
Canada (Einarson) 🔨	0	1	0	0	1	0	2	0	1	0	5
United States (Peterson)	0	0	1	1	0	2	0	2	0	1	7

Sheet D	1	2	3	4	5	6	7	8	9	10	Final
New Zealand (Smith) 🔨	1	0	1	2	0	1	0	3	4	X	12
Mexico (Camarena)	0	1	0	0	1	0	2	0	0	X	4

===== Draw 6 =====
Wednesday, November 1, 14:00

Sheet A	1	2	3	4	5	6	7	8	9	10	Final
South Korea (Gim) 🔨	2	0	0	2	0	0	2	1	0	2	9
Canada (Einarson)	0	1	1	0	0	2	0	0	4	0	8

Sheet B	1	2	3	4	5	6	7	8	9	10	Final
Mexico (Camarena) 🔨	0	1	1	0	1	0	0	0	2	X	5
Chinese Taipei (Lu)	2	0	0	1	0	1	1	1	0	X	6

Sheet C	1	2	3	4	5	6	7	8	9	10	Final
Australia (Westhagen)	1	0	1	2	0	2	0	3	0	X	9
New Zealand (Smith) 🔨	0	1	0	0	2	0	1	0	3	X	7

Sheet D	1	2	3	4	5	6	7	8	9	10	Final
United States (Peterson)	0	0	2	0	0	0	1	0	0	X	3
Japan (Fujisawa) 🔨	1	1	0	0	3	1	0	1	1	X	8

===== Draw 7 =====
Thursady, November 2, 9:00

Sheet A	1	2	3	4	5	6	7	8	9	10	Final
Japan (Fujisawa) 🔨	3	1	0	2	1	0	0	0	3	X	10
Australia (Westhagen)	0	0	2	0	0	2	0	0	0	X	4

Sheet B	1	2	3	4	5	6	7	8	9	10	Final
New Zealand (Smith)	0	0	1	1	0	0	0	1	0	X	3
United States (Peterson) 🔨	2	1	0	0	1	2	1	0	1	X	8

Sheet C	1	2	3	4	5	6	7	8	9	10	Final
Mexico (Camarena)	0	1	0	0	0	0	X	X	X	X	1
Canada (Einarson) 🔨	5	0	5	3	3	1	X	X	X	X	17

Sheet D	1	2	3	4	5	6	7	8	9	10	Final
Chinese Taipei (Lu)	0	2	0	0	1	0	X	X	X	X	3
South Korea (Gim) 🔨	2	0	0	3	0	5	X	X	X	X	10

==== Playoffs ====
Semifinals
1	South Korea	8
4	Canada	4
2	Japan	10
3	United States	8

Gold medal game
1	South Korea	11
2	Japan	6
Bronze medal game
4	Canada	7
3	United States	8

===== Semifinals =====
Thursday, November 2, 19:00

Sheet B	1	2	3	4	5	6	7	8	9	10	Final
South Korea (Gim) 🔨	0	1	0	1	0	2	0	2	2	X	8
Canada (Einarson)	0	0	0	0	1	0	3	0	0	X	4

Player percentages
South Korea		Canada	
Seol Ye-eun	90%	Briane Harris	93%
Kim Su-ji	85%	Shannon Birchard	88%
Kim Min-ji	74%	Val Sweeting	92%
Gim Eun-ji	78%	Kerri Einarson	78%
Total	82%	Total	88%

Sheet D	1	2	3	4	5	6	7	8	9	10	11	Final
Japan (Fujisawa) 🔨	0	2	1	0	2	0	1	0	0	2	2	10
United States (Peterson)	2	0	0	1	0	3	0	0	2	0	0	8

Player percentages
Japan		United States	
Yurika Yoshida	91%	Becca Hamilton	82%
Yumi Suzuki	88%	Tara Peterson	68%
Chinami Yoshida	82%	Cory Thiesse	85%
Satsuki Fujisawa	67%	Tabitha Peterson	67%
Total	82%	Total	76%

===== Bronze medal game =====
Friday, November 3, 14:00

Sheet C	1	2	3	4	5	6	7	8	9	10	11	Final
Canada (Einarson)	0	1	1	0	0	2	0	0	3	0	0	7
United States (Peterson) 🔨	2	0	0	1	1	0	0	2	0	1	1	8

Player percentages
Canada		United States	
Briane Harris	89%	Becca Hamilton	76%
Shannon Birchard	85%	Tara Peterson	78%
Val Sweeting	84%	Cory Thiesse	85%
Kerri Einarson	76%	Tabitha Peterson	76%
Total	84%	Total	79%

===== Gold medal game =====
Saturday, November 4, 10:00

Sheet C	1	2	3	4	5	6	7	8	9	10	Final
South Korea (Gim) 🔨	2	0	2	0	2	0	3	1	1	X	11
Japan (Fujisawa)	0	2	0	3	0	1	0	0	0	X	6

Player percentages
South Korea		Japan	
Seol Ye-eun	86%	Yurika Yoshida	96%
Kim Su-ji	75%	Yumi Suzuki	68%
Kim Min-ji	88%	Chinami Yoshida	65%
Gim Eun-ji	83%	Satsuki Fujisawa	65%
Total	83%	Total	74%

==== Player percentages ====
Round robin only

Leads	%
(United States) Becca Hamilton	87.5
(Canada) Briane Harris	87.1
(South Korea) Seol Ye-eun	86.8
(Japan) Yurika Yoshida	83.0
(Australia) Carlee Millikin	71.8

Seconds	%
(United States) Tara Peterson	82.4
(South Korea) Kim Su-ji	81.4
(Canada) Shannon Birchard	81.3
(Japan) Yumi Suzuki	79.5
(New Zealand) Bridget Becker	70.0

Thirds	%
(South Korea) Kim Min-ji	84.5
(United States) Cory Thiesse	83.7
(Canada) Val Sweeting	83.6
(Japan) Chinami Yoshida	82.6
(Australia) Sara Westman	70.5

Skips	%
(Canada) Kerri Einarson	81.3
(United States) Tabitha Peterson	80.6
(South Korea) Gim Eun-ji	79.9
(Japan) Satsuki Fujisawa	78.4
(Australia) Jennifer Westhagen	65.9

==== Final standings ====
Key
Teams Advance to the 2024 World Women's Curling Championship
Team Relegated to 2024 B Division

Place	Team
1st place, gold medalist(s)	South Korea
2nd place, silver medalist(s)	Japan
3rd place, bronze medalist(s)	United States
4	Canada
5	New Zealand
6	Chinese Taipei
7	Mexico
8	Australia

=== B division ===
==== Teams ====
The teams are listed as follows:

Brazil	China	Hong Kong
Skip: Anne Shibuya; Third: Luciana Barrella; Second: Sarah Lippi; Lead: Isabelle Campos; Alternate: Marcelia Melo	Skip: Han Yu; Third: Wang Meini; Second: Tian Linyuan; Lead: Yu Jiaxin; Alternate: Wang Rui	Skip: Ling-Yue Hung; Third: Ada Shang; Second: Pianpian Hu; Lead: Ashura Wong; Alternate: Ka Chan
Jamaica	Kenya	Philippines
Skip: Cristiene Hall; Third: Madeleine Spurgeon; Second: Stephanie Chen; Lead: Margot Shepherd-Spurgeon	Skip: Laventer Oguta; Third: Hanana Ali; Second: Mercy Ngovi; Lead: Kyra Kemu; Alternate: Grace Kimathi	Skip: Donna Umali; Third: Micha Suarez; Second: Jennifer de la Fuente; Lead: Anne Marie Bonache

==== Round robin standings ====
Final Round Robin Standings

Key
Teams to Playoffs

Country	Skip	W	L	W–L	DSC
China	Han Yu	5	0	–	36.85
Jamaica	Cristiene Hall	4	1	–	101.91
Brazil	Anne Shibuya	3	2	–	126.19
Hong Kong	Ling-Yue Hung	2	3	–	96.99
Philippines	Donna Umali	1	4	–	159.69
Kenya	Laventer Oguta	0	5	–	177.89

Round Robin Summary Table
Pos.	Country	Brazil	China	Hong Kong	Jamaica	Kenya	Philippines	Record
3	Brazil	—	0–14	6–5	5–10	14–1	13–4	3–2
1	China	14–0	—	10–3	12–2	13–0	18–1	5–0
4	Hong Kong	5–6	3–10	—	4–10	13–1	10–5	2–3
2	Jamaica	10–5	2–12	10–4	—	21–0	13–1	4–1
6	Kenya	1–14	0–13	1–13	0–21	—	4–11	0–5
5	Philippines	4–13	1–18	5–10	1–13	11–4	—	1–4

==== Round robin results ====
All draw times are listed in Pacific Time (UTC−07:00).

===== Draw 1 =====
Sunday, October 29, 19:30

Sheet E	1	2	3	4	5	6	7	8	9	10	Final
China (Han) 🔨	0	5	0	3	0	1	1	0	X	X	10
Hong Kong (Hung)	0	0	1	0	1	0	0	1	X	X	3

Sheet F	1	2	3	4	5	6	7	8	9	10	Final
Jamaica (Hall) 🔨	4	4	3	3	5	2	X	X	X	X	21
Kenya (Oguta)	0	0	0	0	0	0	X	X	X	X	0

Sheet G	1	2	3	4	5	6	7	8	9	10	Final
Brazil (Shibuya)	3	0	4	0	1	1	1	3	0	X	13
Philippines (Umali) 🔨	0	1	0	2	0	0	0	0	1	X	4

===== Draw 2 =====
Monday, October 30, 14:00

Sheet E	1	2	3	4	5	6	7	8	9	10	Final
Philippines (Umali)	0	0	0	0	1	0	X	X	X	X	1
Jamaica (Hall) 🔨	3	3	1	3	0	3	X	X	X	X	13

Sheet F	1	2	3	4	5	6	7	8	9	10	Final
Brazil (Shibuya)	0	0	0	0	0	0	X	X	X	X	0
China (Han) 🔨	3	2	4	2	2	1	X	X	X	X	14

Sheet H	1	2	3	4	5	6	7	8	9	10	Final
Kenya (Oguta)	0	0	1	0	0	0	0	X	X	X	1
Hong Kong (Hung) 🔨	3	3	0	1	1	1	4	X	X	X	13

===== Draw 3 =====
Tuesday, October 31, 9:00

Sheet F	1	2	3	4	5	6	7	8	9	10	Final
Philippines (Umali)	0	0	1	0	1	0	0	2	1	X	5
Hong Kong (Hung) 🔨	1	2	0	2	0	4	1	0	0	X	10

Sheet G	1	2	3	4	5	6	7	8	9	10	Final
Kenya (Oguta)	0	0	0	0	0	0	X	X	X	X	0
China (Han) 🔨	5	2	1	1	4	0	X	X	X	X	13

Sheet H	1	2	3	4	5	6	7	8	9	10	Final
Jamaica (Hall) 🔨	1	0	1	1	1	0	0	2	1	3	10
Brazil (Shibuya)	0	3	0	0	0	1	1	0	0	0	5

===== Draw 4 =====
Wednesday, November 1, 14:00

Sheet F	1	2	3	4	5	6	7	8	9	10	Final
Kenya (Oguta)	0	0	0	0	0	1	X	X	X	X	1
Brazil (Shibuya) 🔨	4	2	4	2	2	0	X	X	X	X	14

Sheet G	1	2	3	4	5	6	7	8	9	10	Final
Hong Kong (Hung) 🔨	0	1	0	1	0	0	2	1	1	X	6
Jamaica (Hall)	0	0	2	0	4	4	0	0	0	X	10

Sheet H	1	2	3	4	5	6	7	8	9	10	Final
China (Han) 🔨	4	1	5	0	5	3	X	X	X	X	18
Philippines (Umali)	0	0	0	1	0	0	X	X	X	X	1

===== Draw 5 =====
Thursday, November 2, 9:00

Sheet E	1	2	3	4	5	6	7	8	9	10	Final
Hong Kong (Hung)	0	0	1	0	1	0	0	2	0	1	5
Brazil (Shibuya) 🔨	0	1	0	1	0	1	2	0	1	0	6

Sheet F	1	2	3	4	5	6	7	8	9	10	Final
China (Han) 🔨	0	2	4	0	2	4	X	X	X	X	12
Jamaica (Hall)	1	0	0	1	0	0	X	X	X	X	2

Sheet G	1	2	3	4	5	6	7	8	9	10	Final
Philippines (Umali)	1	3	2	1	0	0	0	4	X	X	11
Kenya (Oguta) 🔨	0	0	0	0	1	2	1	0	X	X	4

==== Playoffs ====
Semifinal			Gold medal game
			1	China	11
2	Jamaica	10	2	Jamaica	3
3	Brazil	5

===== Semifinal =====
Friday, November 3, 14:00

Sheet F	1	2	3	4	5	6	7	8	9	10	Final
Jamaica (Hall) 🔨	1	0	1	0	0	3	0	4	1	X	10
Brazil (Shibuya)	0	2	0	0	1	0	2	0	0	X	5

===== Gold medal game =====
Saturday, November 4, 10:00

Sheet G	1	2	3	4	5	6	7	8	9	10	Final
China (Han) 🔨	2	1	0	6	0	0	2	0	X	X	11
Jamaica (Hall)	0	0	1	0	0	1	0	1	X	X	3

==== Final standings ====
Key
Team Promoted to 2024 A Division

Place	Team
1st place, gold medalist(s)	China
2nd place, silver medalist(s)	Jamaica
3rd place, bronze medalist(s)	Brazil
4	Hong Kong
5	Philippines
6	Kenya
