= 2016 World Mixed Curling Championship =

- Host city: Kazan, Russia
- Arena: Sport Palace
- Dates: October 14–22
- Winner: Russia
- Skip: Alexander Krushelnitskiy
- Third: Anastasia Bryzgalova
- Second: Daniil Goriachev
- Lead: Maria Duyunova
- Coach: Vasily Gudin
- Finalist: Sweden

The 2016 World Mixed Curling Championship was held from October 14 to 22 at the Sport Palace in Kazan, Russia. Among the 37 participating nations, Andorra, Croatia, South Korea and the Netherlands debuted at the event, while China, Israel and Lithuania did not participate.

== Teams ==
=== Group A ===
Norway	Italy	Scotland	Japan
Skip: Christer Wilbe; Third: Elin Ingvaldsen; Second: Victor Bergerskogen; Lead: Jeanette Husnes Moe	Fourth: Fabio Sola; Skip: Denise Pimpini; Second: Simone Sola; Lead: Sara Aliberti	Skip: Cameron Bryce; Third: Katie Murray; Second: Bobby Lammie; Lead: Sophie Jackson	Skip: Mayumi Okutsu; Third: Fukuhiro Ohno; Second: Yuka Sato; Lead: Masayuki Fujii
New Zealand	Belarus	Romania	
Skip: Brett Sargon; Third: Thivya Jeyaranjan; Second: Kieran Ford; Lead: Emily Whelan	Skip: Dimitry Barkan; Third: Alina Pauliuchyk; Second: Andrei Yurkevich; Lead: Marharyta Dziashuk	Fourth: Allen Coliban; Skip: Iulia Ioana Traila; Second: Razvan Bouleanu; Lead: Octavia Maria Traila	

=== Group B ===
Sweden	Hungary	Finland	Slovakia
Skip: Kristian Lindström; Third: Jennie Wåhlin; Second: Joakim Flyg; Lead: Johanna Heldin	Skip: Zsolt Kiss; Third: Dorottya Palancsa; Second: Kristóf Czermann; Lead: Ágnes Szentannai	Fourth: Jere Sullanmaa; Third: Milja Hellsten; Skip: Toni Sepperi; Lead: Jenni Räsänen	Skip: David Misun; Third: Daniela Matulova; Second: Jakub Polak; Lead: Silvia Sykorova
Ireland	England	Brazil	
Skip: Bill Gray; Third: Margarita Sweeney-Baird; Second: Ross Barr; Lead: Jacqueline Barr	Skip: Greg Dunn; Third: Angharad Ward; Second: Nigel Patrick; Lead: Lorna Rettig	Skip: Raphael Monticello; Third: Alessandra Barros; Second: Marcio Cerquinho; Lead: Luciana Barrella	

=== Group C ===
Russia	Denmark	Poland	Czech Republic
Skip: Alexander Krushelnitskiy; Third: Anastasia Bryzgalova; Second: Daniil Goriachev; Lead: Maria Duyunova	Skip: Joel Ostrowski; Third: Camilla Louise Jensen; Second: Asmus Joergensen; Lead: Pavia Hjorngaard	Skip: Andrzej Augustyniak; Third: Adela Walczak; Second: Kasper Knebloch; Lead: Martyna Wilczak	Skip: Jakub Bareš; Third: Lenka Kitzbergerová; Second: Jindřich Kitzberger; Lead: Michaela Nádherová
Spain	Australia	Kazakhstan	
Skip: Irantzu García; Third: Gontzal García; Second: Maria Fernandez; Lead: Manu García	Skip: Hugh Millikin; Third: Kim Forge; Second: Steve Johns; Lead: Helen Williams	Skip: Viktor Kim; Third: Olga Ten; Second: Abylaikhan Zhuzbay; Lead: Anastassya Surgay	

=== Group D ===
Canada	United States	France	Latvia
Skip: Mick Lizmore; Third: Sarah Wilkes; Second: Brad Thiessen; Lead: Alison Kotylak	Skip: Fred Maxie; Third: Emily Good; Second: MacAllen Guy; Lead: Frances Walsh	Skip: Stephane Vergnaud; Third: Allison Brageul; Second: Mathieu Dorbe; Lead: Celine Lagree	Skip: Ansis Regža; Third: Dace Regža; Second: Aivars Gavars; Lead: Antra Zvane
Austria	Belgium	South Korea	Andorra
Skip: Andreas Unterberger; Third: Hannah Augustin; Second: Gernot Higatzberger; Lead: Celine Moser	Skip: Loes Willems; Third: Kevin Cox; Second: Famkje Van Den Bosch; Lead: Dirk Stabel	Skip: Lee Ki-bok; Third: Yeo Eun-byeol; Second: Seong Yu-jin; Lead: Ahn Jeong-yeon	Skip: Josep Garcia; Third: Ana Arce; Second: Josep Duro; Lead: Anna Arias

=== Group E ===
Germany	Switzerland	Turkey	Estonia
Skip: Andy Kapp; Third: Petra Tschetsch; Second: Holger Höhne; Lead: Pia-Lisa Schöll	Skip: Martin Rios; Third: Elena Stern; Second: Romano Meier; Lead: Michèle Jäggi	Skip: Alican Karataş; Third: Öznur Polat; Second: Uğurcan Karagöz; Lead: Dilşat Yıldız	Skip: Kaarel Holm; Third: Elise Nassar; Second: Sten Andreas Ehrlich; Lead: Erika Tuvike
Wales	Slovenia	Netherlands	Croatia
Skip: Andrew Tanner; Third: Laura Beever; Second: David Peek; Lead: Emily Sandwidth	Skip: Jure Culic; Third: Ajda Zavrtanik Drglin; Second: Gregor Verbinc; Lead: Lea Tehovnik	Skip: Danny Van Den Berg; Third: Valeriya Miksha; Second: Willem Van Der Steeg; Lead: Jiska Kortekaas-Bun	Skip: Mislav Martinic; Third: Iva Roso; Second: Hrvoje Tolic; Lead: Antonia Maricevic

== Round-robin standings ==
Final Round Robin Standings

Key
Teams to Playoffs
Teams to Tiebreaker

Group A	Skip	W	L
Scotland	Cameron Bryce	6	0
Japan	Mayumi Okutsu	5	1
Italy	Denise Pimpini	4	2
New Zealand	Brett Sargon	3	3
Norway	Christer Wilbe	2	4
Belarus	Dimitry Barkan	1	5
Romania	Iulia Ioana Traila	0	6

Group B	Skip	W	L
Sweden	Kristian Lindström	6	0
Hungary	Zsolt Kiss	5	1
England	Greg Dunn	3	3
Finland	Toni Sepperi	3	3
Ireland	Bill Gray	2	4
Slovakia	David Misun	2	4
Brazil	Raphael Monticello	0	6

Group C	Skip	W	L
Russia	Alexander Krushelnitskiy	6	0
Poland	Andrzej Augustyniak	4	2
Denmark	Joel Ostrowski	4	2
Czech Republic	Jakub Bareš	4	2
Australia	Hugh Millikin	2	4
Spain	Irantzu García	1	5
Kazakhstan	Viktor Kim	0	6

Group D	Skip	W	L
Canada	Mick Lizmore	7	0
South Korea	Lee Ki-bok	5	2
United States	Fred Maxie	5	2
Austria	Andreas Unterberger	4	3
Latvia	Ansis Regža	4	3
France	Stephane Vargnaud	2	5
Andorra	Josep Garcia	1	6
Belgium	Loes Willems	0	7

Group E	Skip	W	L
Germany	Andy Kapp	7	0
Switzerland	Martin Rios	6	1
Turkey	Alican Karataş	5	2
Wales	Andrew Tanner	4	3
Estonia	Kaarel Holm	3	4
Croatia	Mislav Martinic	2	5
Slovenia	Jure Gulic	1	6
Netherlands	Danny Van Den Berg	0	7

== Round-robin results ==
All draw times are listed in Moscow Time (UTC+3).

=== Group A ===
==== Saturday, October 15 ====
Draw 3 12:00

Sheet E	1	2	3	4	5	6	7	8	Final
Japan (Okutsu) 🔨	0	0	2	0	0	2	0	2	6
Belarus (Barkan)	0	1	0	0	3	0	1	0	5

Draw 4 16:00

Sheet B	1	2	3	4	5	6	7	8	Final
Scotland (Bryce) 🔨	0	0	2	3	0	3	X	X	8
Italy (Pimpini)	1	1	0	0	1	0	X	X	3

Draw 4 16:00

Sheet C	1	2	3	4	5	6	7	8	9	Final
Romania (Traila)	0	2	0	0	1	0	0	1	0	4
Norway (Wilbe) 🔨	0	0	1	1	0	2	0	0	3	7

Draw 5 20:00

Sheet A	1	2	3	4	5	6	7	8	Final
New Zealand (Sargon)	0	0	0	2	0	1	0	X	3
Japan (Okutsu) 🔨	2	1	1	0	4	0	1	X	9

==== Sunday, October 16 ====
Draw 6 08:00

Sheet E	1	2	3	4	5	6	7	8	Final
Italy (Pimpini)	1	0	2	1	1	1	0	X	6
Romania (Traila) 🔨	0	0	0	0	0	0	2	X	2

Draw 7 12:00

Sheet B	1	2	3	4	5	6	7	8	Final
Norway (Wilbe)	0	0	0	0	0	0	X	X	0
New Zealand (Sargon) 🔨	2	0	2	1	2	1	X	X	8

Draw 8 16:00

Sheet D	1	2	3	4	5	6	7	8	Final
Belarus (Barkan)	0	0	0	1	0	2	0	X	3
Italy (Pimpini) 🔨	1	1	1	0	2	0	3	X	8

Draw 9 20:00

Sheet D	1	2	3	4	5	6	7	8	Final
Scotland (Bryce)	1	2	4	0	0	1	X	X	8
Norway (Wilbe) 🔨	0	0	0	1	0	0	X	X	1

==== Monday, October 17 ====
Draw 10 08:00

Sheet D	1	2	3	4	5	6	7	8	Final
New Zealand (Sargon) 🔨	1	3	1	2	0	2	X	X	9
Romania (Traila)	0	0	0	0	1	0	X	X	1

Draw 12 16:00

Sheet C	1	2	3	4	5	6	7	8	Final
Italy (Pimpini) 🔨	0	1	1	0	1	0	1	3	7
New Zealand (Sargon)	1	0	0	1	0	2	0	0	4

Draw 12 16:00

Sheet D	1	2	3	4	5	6	7	8	Final
Japan (Okutsu)	0	1	0	0	1	0	2	X	4
Scotland (Bryce) 🔨	2	0	2	2	0	1	0	X	7

Draw 12 16:00

Sheet E	1	2	3	4	5	6	7	8	Final
Belarus (Barkan)	0	0	0	0	0	0	X	X	0
Norway (Wilbe) 🔨	1	3	2	1	5	2	X	X	14

==== Tuesday, October 18 ====
Draw 14 08:00

Sheet A	1	2	3	4	5	6	7	8	Final
Belarus (Barkan) 🔨	2	0	0	1	0	0	1	0	4
New Zealand (Sargon)	0	2	1	0	0	1	0	1	5

Draw 14 08:00

Sheet B	1	2	3	4	5	6	7	8	Final
Italy (Pimpini)	0	0	0	2	0	1	1	0	4
Japan (Okutsu) 🔨	2	0	1	0	0	0	0	3	6

Draw 16 16:00

Sheet A	1	2	3	4	5	6	7	8	Final
Romania (Traila)	0	0	1	0	2	0	1	X	4
Scotland (Bryce) 🔨	4	1	0	1	0	2	0	X	8

==== Wednesday, October 19 ====
Draw 18 08:00

Sheet A	1	2	3	4	5	6	7	8	Final
Japan (Okutsu)	1	4	0	1	1	2	X	X	9
Romania (Traila) 🔨	0	0	2	0	0	0	X	X	2

Draw 18 08:00

Sheet C	1	2	3	4	5	6	7	8	Final
Scotland (Bryce) 🔨	0	5	1	0	1	0	0	2	9
Belarus (Barkan)	1	0	0	1	0	2	1	0	5

Draw 20 16:00

Sheet C	1	2	3	4	5	6	7	8	Final
Norway (Wilbe)	0	1	0	1	0	0	0	1	3
Japan (Okutsu) 🔨	2	0	1	0	0	1	1	0	5

==== Thursday, October 20 ====
Draw 22 08:00

Sheet A	1	2	3	4	5	6	7	8	9	Final
Norway (Wilbe) 🔨	1	2	0	1	0	0	0	1	0	5
Italy (Pimpini)	0	0	2	0	1	1	1	0	2	7

Draw 22 08:00

Sheet B	1	2	3	4	5	6	7	8	Final
Romania (Traila) 🔨	0	1	2	0	0	0	2	0	5
Belarus (Barkan)	1	0	0	3	0	1	0	1	6

Draw 22 08:00

Sheet E	1	2	3	4	5	6	7	8	Final
New Zealand (Sargon) 🔨	0	0	1	0	0	1	0	X	2
Scotland (Bryce)	1	2	0	1	2	0	1	X	7

=== Group B ===
==== Saturday, October 15 ====
Draw 2 08:00

Sheet B	1	2	3	4	5	6	7	8	Final
Brazil (Monticello) 🔨	0	0	1	0	0	0	X	X	1
England (Dunn)	1	2	0	4	3	2	X	X	12

Draw 2 08:00

Sheet C	1	2	3	4	5	6	7	8	Final
Sweden (Lindström)	0	2	1	0	0	3	3	X	9
Ireland (Gray) 🔨	0	0	0	1	1	0	0	X	2

Draw 4 16:00

Sheet A	1	2	3	4	5	6	7	8	Final
England (Dunn)	0	0	0	1	0	2	0	X	3
Slovakia (Misun) 🔨	0	1	1	0	1	0	5	X	8

Draw 5 20:00

Sheet E	1	2	3	4	5	6	7	8	9	Final
Hungary (Kiss) 🔨	1	0	1	1	0	0	3	0	1	7
Finland (Sepperi)	0	2	0	0	0	2	0	2	0	6

==== Sunday, October 16 ====
Draw 6 08:00

Sheet D	1	2	3	4	5	6	7	8	Final
England (Dunn)	0	1	0	2	0	2	0	3	8
Ireland (Gray) 🔨	1	0	1	0	1	0	2	0	5

Draw 7 12:00

Sheet A	1	2	3	4	5	6	7	8	Final
Slovakia (Misun) 🔨	0	0	1	0	1	0	1	X	3
Hungary (Kiss)	2	0	0	2	0	3	0	X	7

Draw 8 16:00

Sheet C	1	2	3	4	5	6	7	8	9	Final
Finland (Sepperi) 🔨	0	0	0	1	1	1	0	1	0	4
Sweden (Lindström)	1	1	1	0	0	0	1	0	1	5

Draw 8 16:00

Sheet E	1	2	3	4	5	6	7	8	Final
Ireland (Gray) 🔨	3	0	3	3	0	0	4	X	13
Brazil (Monticello)	0	1	0	0	2	1	0	X	4

==== Monday, October 17 ====
Draw 10 08:00

Sheet B	1	2	3	4	5	6	7	8	Final
England (Dunn) 🔨	0	1	1	1	0	2	0	1	6
Finland (Sepperi)	1	0	0	0	1	0	2	0	4

Draw 10 08:00

Sheet E	1	2	3	4	5	6	7	8	Final
Brazil (Monticello)	1	0	0	2	0	0	1	X	4
Slovakia (Misun) 🔨	0	1	2	0	1	2	0	X	6

Draw 12 16:00

Sheet A	1	2	3	4	5	6	7	8	Final
Sweden (Lindström) 🔨	1	3	1	1	4	0	X	X	10
Brazil (Monticello)	0	0	0	0	0	2	X	X	2

Draw 13 20:00

Sheet B	1	2	3	4	5	6	7	8	Final
Ireland (Gray)	0	0	1	0	1	0	X	X	2
Hungary (Kiss) 🔨	4	2	0	1	0	2	X	X	9

==== Tuesday, October 18 ====
Draw 15 12:00

Sheet E	1	2	3	4	5	6	7	8	Final
Sweden (Lindström) 🔨	0	4	0	0	2	1	0	X	7
England (Dunn)	1	0	1	1	0	0	2	X	5

Draw 16 16:00

Sheet D	1	2	3	4	5	6	7	8	9	Final
Slovakia (Misun)	0	1	0	0	0	0	1	1	0	3
Finland (Sepperi) 🔨	1	0	0	0	0	2	0	0	1	4

Draw 17 20:00

Sheet C	1	2	3	4	5	6	7	8	Final
Brazil (Monticello) 🔨	1	0	0	0	2	0	1	0	4
Hungary (Kiss)	0	2	1	1	0	2	0	1	7

==== Wednesday, October 19 ====
Draw 19 12:00

Sheet A	1	2	3	4	5	6	7	8	Final
Finland (Pepperi) 🔨	2	0	0	3	0	1	0	X	6
Ireland (Gray)	0	1	0	0	1	0	0	X	2

Draw 19 12:00

Sheet B	1	2	3	4	5	6	7	8	Final
Slovakia (Misum)	0	1	0	1	0	2	X	X	4
Sweden (Lindström) 🔨	2	0	3	0	3	0	X	X	8

Draw 19 12:00

Sheet C	1	2	3	4	5	6	7	8	Final
Hungary (Kiss) 🔨	2	1	0	2	1	0	1	X	7
England (Dunn)	0	0	1	0	0	1	0	X	2

Draw 21 20:00

Sheet D	1	2	3	4	5	6	7	8	Final
Finland (Sepperi) 🔨	0	2	1	0	1	1	0	0	5
Brazil (Monticello)	1	0	0	1	0	0	2	0	4

==== Thursday, October 20 ====
Draw 22 08:00

Sheet C	1	2	3	4	5	6	7	8	Final
Ireland (Gray)	0	1	1	0	1	0	2	1	6
Slovakia (Misun)	0	0	0	1	0	3	0	0	4

Draw 22 08:00

Sheet D	1	2	3	4	5	6	7	8	Final
Hungary (Kiss)	0	0	2	0	0	1	X	X	3
Sweden (Lindström) 🔨	3	2	0	2	1	0	X	X	8

=== Group C ===
==== Friday, October 14 ====
Draw 1 18:30

Sheet C	1	2	3	4	5	6	7	8	Final
Russia (Krushelnitskiy) 🔨	0	1	1	1	0	5	X	X	8
Spain (García)	1	0	0	0	1	0	X	X	2

==== Saturday, October 15 ====
Draw 2 08:00

Sheet E	1	2	3	4	5	6	7	8	Final
Kazakhstan (Kim)	0	0	0	0	0	0	X	X	0
Poland (Augustyniak) 🔨	2	1	1	3	1	2	X	X	10

Draw 3 12:00

Sheet D	1	2	3	4	5	6	7	8	Final
Czech Republic (Bareš) 🔨	1	0	1	0	2	0	1	X	5
Russia (Krushelnitskiy)	0	3	0	3	0	1	0	X	7

Draw 4 16:00

Sheet D	1	2	3	4	5	6	7	8	Final
Poland (Augustyniak)	0	0	0	2	1	0	1	1	5
Denmark (Ostrowski) 🔨	1	0	0	0	0	1	0	0	2

Draw 4 16:00

Sheet E	1	2	3	4	5	6	7	8	Final
Spain (García)	0	0	0	2	0	0	0	X	2
Australia (Millikin) 🔨	0	2	2	0	0	2	1	X	7

==== Sunday, October 16 ====
Draw 6 08:00

Sheet C	1	2	3	4	5	6	7	8	Final
Denmark (Ostrowski) 🔨	1	0	0	1	0	0	0	2	4
Australia (Millikin)	0	0	1	0	0	1	1	0	3

Draw 8 16:00

Sheet B	1	2	3	4	5	6	7	8	Final
Australia (Millikin) 🔨	0	0	3	0	1	0	0	0	4
Czech Republic (Bareš)	1	0	0	2	0	1	0	2	6

Draw 9 20:00

Sheet A	1	2	3	4	5	6	7	8	Final
Russia (Krushelnitskiy) 🔨	3	0	3	0	0	0	3	X	9
Poland (Augustyniak)	0	3	0	0	1	0	0	X	4

Draw 9 20:00

Sheet C	1	2	3	4	5	6	7	8	Final
Spain (García)	5	0	5	1	0	2	X	X	13
Kazakhstan (Kim) 🔨	0	1	0	0	1	0	X	X	2

==== Monday, October 17 ====
Draw 11 12:00

Sheet A	1	2	3	4	5	6	7	8	Final
Kazakhstan (Kim)	0	1	1	0	0	0	X	X	2
Denmark (Ostrowski) 🔨	6	0	0	4	5	1	X	X	16

Draw 13 20:00

Sheet C	1	2	3	4	5	6	7	8	Final
Poland (Augustyniak)	0	0	2	0	1	0	0	X	3
Czech Republic (Bareš) 🔨	1	0	0	3	0	1	3	X	8

Draw 13 20:00

Sheet D	1	2	3	4	5	6	7	8	Final
Australia (Millikin) 🔨	0	2	1	0	3	0	3	X	9
Kazakhstan (Kim)	2	0	0	1	0	1	0	X	4

==== Tuesday, October 18 ====
Draw 14 08:00

Sheet E	1	2	3	4	5	6	7	8	Final
Russia (Krushelnitskiy) 🔨	2	0	1	2	0	4	X	X	9
Denmark (Ostrowski)	0	2	0	0	1	0	X	X	3

Draw 16 16:00

Sheet B	1	2	3	4	5	6	7	8	Final
Kazakhstan (Kim)	1	0	0	0	0	0	X	X	1
Russia (Krushelnitskiy) 🔨	0	3	5	1	1	2	X	X	12

Draw 17 20:00

Sheet B	1	2	3	4	5	6	7	8	Final
Poland (Augustyniak)	0	0	0	2	1	1	0	2	6
Australia (Millikin)	1	0	1	0	0	0	3	0	5

==== Wednesday, October 19 ====
Draw 18 08:00

Sheet B	1	2	3	4	5	6	7	8	Final
Denmark (Ostrowski) 🔨	0	0	2	0	4	0	1	X	7
Spain (García)	0	0	0	1	0	1	0	X	2

Draw 18 08:00

Sheet D	1	2	3	4	5	6	7	8	Final
Czech Republic (Bareš) 🔨	4	0	1	0	4	1	1	X	11
Kazakhstan (Kim)	0	2	0	3	0	0	0	X	5

Draw 20 16:00

Sheet A	1	2	3	4	5	6	7	8	Final
Czech Republic (Bareš)	0	0	2	2	0	0	2	X	6
Spain (García) 🔨	0	1	0	0	1	1	0	X	3

Draw 21 20:00

Sheet A	1	2	3	4	5	6	7	8	Final
Australia (Millikin) 🔨	0	1	0	0	0	2	1	X	4
Russia (Krushelnitskiy)	0	0	1	2	3	0	0	X	6

==== Thursday, October 20 ====
Draw 23 12:00

Sheet D	1	2	3	4	5	6	7	8	Final
Spain (García)	0	0	1	0	0	0	0	0	1
Poland (Augustyniak) 🔨	0	1	0	0	0	1	0	1	3

Draw 23 12:00

Sheet E	1	2	3	4	5	6	7	8	9	Final
Denmark (Ostrowski) 🔨	3	0	1	1	0	1	1	0	1	8
Czech Republic (Bareš)	0	2	0	0	2	0	0	3	0	7

=== Group D ===
==== Friday, October 14 ====
Draw 1 18:30

Sheet A	1	2	3	4	5	6	7	8	Final
France (Vergnaud) 🔨	0	3	2	1	0	2	0	X	8
Andorra (Garcia)	1	0	0	0	2	0	2	X	5

Draw 1 18:30

Sheet B	1	2	3	4	5	6	7	8	Final
Canada (Lizmore)	0	5	1	2	0	1	X	X	9
United States (Maxie) 🔨	1	0	0	0	1	0	X	X	2

Draw 1 18:30

Sheet E	1	2	3	4	5	6	7	8	Final
Latvia (Regža) 🔨	0	0	2	0	1	0	0	1	4
Austria (Unterberger)	0	0	0	1	0	1	1	0	3

==== Saturday, October 15 ====
Draw 3 12:00

Sheet A	1	2	3	4	5	6	7	8	9	Final
South Korea (Lee)	0	0	1	0	0	2	2	0	1	6
United States (Maxie) 🔨	1	0	0	0	2	0	0	2	0	5

Draw 5 20:00

Sheet B	1	2	3	4	5	6	7	8	Final
Belgium (Willems)	0	1	2	1	0	1	0	0	5
Austria (Unterberger)	1	0	0	0	4	0	2	1	8

Draw 5 20:00

Sheet C	1	2	3	4	5	6	7	8	Final
Latvia (Regža) 🔨	0	4	1	0	1	5	X	X	11
Andorra (Garcia)	0	0	0	1	0	0	X	X	1

Draw 5 20:00

Sheet D	1	2	3	4	5	6	7	8	Final
Canada (Lizmore) 🔨	4	0	3	0	0	2	X	X	9
France (Vergnaud)	0	1	0	0	1	0	X	X	2

==== Sunday, October 16 ====
Draw 7 12:00

Sheet C	1	2	3	4	5	6	7	8	Final
Austria (Unterberger)	0	1	0	2	0	1	0	X	4
United States (Maxie) 🔨	2	0	2	0	1	0	1	X	6

Draw 8 16:00

Sheet A	1	2	3	4	5	6	7	8	Final
Canada (Lizmore) 🔨	4	0	2	0	1	0	X	X	7
Latvia (Regža)	0	0	0	1	0	1	X	X	2

Draw 9 20:00

Sheet B	1	2	3	4	5	6	7	8	Final
South Korea (Lee)	0	2	0	3	2	0	1	X	8
France (Vergnaud) 🔨	1	0	1	0	0	1	0	X	3

Draw 9 20:00

Sheet E	1	2	3	4	5	6	7	8	Final
Belgium (Willems) 🔨	0	2	2	0	2	0	0	0	6
Andorra (Garcia)	2	0	0	1	0	1	2	1	7

==== Monday, October 17 ====
Draw 11 12:00

Sheet C	1	2	3	4	5	6	7	8	Final
France (Vergnaud) 🔨	1	0	1	0	2	0	0	X	4
Latvia (Regža)	0	2	0	1	0	1	5	X	9

Draw 11 12:00

Sheet D	1	2	3	4	5	6	7	8	Final
South Korea (Lee)	0	0	0	0	0	0	X	X	0
Austria (Unterberger) 🔨	1	1	2	1	5	0	X	X	10

Draw 12 16:00

Sheet D	1	2	3	4	5	6	7	8	Final
Andorra (Garcia)	0	0	1	0	1	0	X	X	2
Canada (Lizmore) 🔨	0	2	0	3	0	2	X	X	7

Draw 13 20:00

Sheet D	1	2	3	4	5	6	7	8	Final
United States (Maxie) 🔨	2	2	0	0	0	4	2	X	10
Belgium (Willems)	0	0	3	1	1	0	0	X	5

==== Tuesday, October 18 ====
Draw 15 12:00

Sheet A	1	2	3	4	5	6	7	8	Final
Austria (Unterberger)	3	0	4	0	2	1	X	X	10
France (Vergnaud) 🔨	0	2	0	3	0	0	X	X	5

Draw 15 12:00

Sheet D	1	2	3	4	5	6	7	8	Final
Andorra (Garcia)	0	0	0	1	0	0	X	X	1
United States (Maxie) 🔨	2	3	1	0	4	1	X	X	11

Draw 16 16:00

Sheet C	1	2	3	4	5	6	7	8	Final
Belgium (Willems)	0	1	1	0	0	0	0	X	2
Canada (Lizmore) 🔨	1	0	0	3	1	1	1	X	7

Draw 17 20:00

Sheet A	1	2	3	4	5	6	7	8	Final
Latvia (Regža)	0	0	0	0	1	0	X	X	1
South Korea (Lee) 🔨	1	3	2	2	0	0	X	X	8

Draw 17 20:00

Sheet E	1	2	3	4	5	6	7	8	Final
United States (Maxie)	1	0	3	1	1	3	X	X	9
France (Vergnaud) 🔨	0	1	0	0	0	0	X	X	1

==== Wednesday, October 19 ====
Draw 19 12:00

Sheet D	1	2	3	4	5	6	7	8	Final
Belgium (Willems) 🔨	1	0	0	1	0	0	X	X	2
Latvia (Regža)	0	1	3	0	3	3	X	X	10

Draw 19 12:00

Sheet E	1	2	3	4	5	6	7	8	Final
Canada (Lizmore) 🔨	3	0	0	0	2	0	0	X	5
South Korea (Lee)	0	0	0	1	0	2	0	X	3

Draw 21 20:00

Sheet B	1	2	3	4	5	6	7	8	Final
Austria (Unterberger) 🔨	2	0	1	0	2	1	1	X	7
Andorra (Garcia)	0	1	0	1	0	0	0	X	2

Draw 21 20:00

Sheet C	1	2	3	4	5	6	7	8	Final
South Korea (Lee) 🔨	2	0	4	0	0	2	X	X	8
Belgium (Willems)	0	1	0	1	0	0	X	X	2

==== Thursday, October 20 ====
Draw 24 16:00

Sheet B	1	2	3	4	5	6	7	8	9	Final
United States (Maxie)	0	0	0	1	0	0	2	0	2	5
Latvia (Regža) 🔨	0	0	1	0	0	1	0	1	0	3

Draw 24 16:00

Sheet C	1	2	3	4	5	6	7	8	Final
Andorra (Garcia) 🔨	2	0	1	0	0	0	0	X	3
South Korea (Lee)	0	4	0	0	0	3	2	X	9

Draw 24 16:00

Sheet D	1	2	3	4	5	6	7	8	Final
France (Vergnaud) 🔨	2	0	0	2	2	2	X	X	8
Belgium (Willems)	0	1	2	0	0	0	X	X	3

Draw 24 16:00

Sheet E	1	2	3	4	5	6	7	8	Final
Austria (Unterberger)	0	2	0	0	0	1	1	X	4
Canada (Lizmore) 🔨	2	0	2	1	1	0	0	X	6

=== Group E ===
==== Friday, October 14 ====
Draw 1 18:30

Sheet D	1	2	3	4	5	6	7	8	Final
Estonia (Holm) 🔨	1	1	0	2	2	0	1	X	7
Croatia (Martinic)	0	0	2	0	0	1	0	X	3

==== Saturday, October 15 ====
Draw 2 08:00

Sheet A	1	2	3	4	5	6	7	8	Final
Germany (Kapp) 🔨	1	2	0	1	0	3	0	X	7
Wales (Tanner)	0	0	1	0	1	0	1	X	3

Draw 2 08:00

Sheet D	1	2	3	4	5	6	7	8	Final
Switzerland (Rios) 🔨	5	0	0	0	1	0	0	3	9
Netherlands (Van Den Berg)	0	1	0	1	0	1	1	0	4

Draw 3 12:00

Sheet B	1	2	3	4	5	6	7	8	Final
Croatia (Martinic) 🔨	1	0	2	1	1	0	1	0	6
Slovenia (Culic)	0	2	0	0	0	1	0	1	4

Draw 3 12:00

Sheet C	1	2	3	4	5	6	7	8	Final
Estonia (Holm) 🔨	1	0	1	0	0	3	0	X	5
Turkey (Karataş)	0	3	0	4	0	0	3	X	10

==== Sunday, October 16 ====
Draw 6 08:00

Sheet A	1	2	3	4	5	6	7	8	9	Final
Netherlands (Van Den Berg)	0	0	2	0	2	0	0	3	0	7
Estonia (Holm) 🔨	0	1	0	1	0	3	2	0	1	8

Draw 6 08:00

Sheet B	1	2	3	4	5	6	7	8	Final
Slovenia (Culic) 🔨	0	0	2	0	1	1	0	0	4
Turkey (Karataş)	0	1	0	3	0	0	0	1	5

Draw 7 12:00

Sheet D	1	2	3	4	5	6	7	8	Final
Germany (Kapp) 🔨	1	1	0	1	0	1	0	1	5
Switzerland (Rios)	0	0	1	0	1	0	2	0	4

Draw 7 12:00

Sheet E	1	2	3	4	5	6	7	8	9	Final
Croatia (Martinic) 🔨	2	0	0	1	1	0	0	2	0	6
Wales (Tanner)	0	1	2	0	0	2	1	0	1	7

==== Monday, October 17 ====
Draw 10 08:00

Sheet A	1	2	3	4	5	6	7	8	Final
Turkey (Karataş) 🔨	1	3	1	4	0	0	X	X	9
Croatia (Martinic)	0	0	0	0	2	1	X	X	3

Draw 10 08:00

Sheet C	1	2	3	4	5	6	7	8	Final
Netherlands (Van Den Berg)	0	0	0	0	0	2	X	X	2
Germany (Kapp) 🔨	3	2	2	2	4	0	X	X	13

Draw 11 12:00

Sheet B	1	2	3	4	5	6	7	8	Final
Wales (Tanner)	0	0	1	0	0	1	0	X	2
Switzerland (Rios) 🔨	2	2	0	0	2	0	2	X	8

Draw 11 12:00

Sheet E	1	2	3	4	5	6	7	8	Final
Slovenia (Culic)	0	0	0	0	2	0	1	0	3
Estonia (Holm) 🔨	0	1	0	1	0	1	0	1	4

Draw 13 20:00

Sheet E	1	2	3	4	5	6	7	8	Final
Estonia (Holm)	1	0	0	1	0	0	1	X	3
Switzerland (Rios) 🔨	0	2	1	0	2	1	0	X	6

==== Tuesday, October 18 ====
Draw 14 08:00

Sheet C	1	2	3	4	5	6	7	8	Final
Slovenia (Culic) 🔨	0	2	1	1	1	0	3	X	8
Netherlands (Van Den Berg)	1	0	0	0	0	1	0	X	2

Draw 14 08:00

Sheet D	1	2	3	4	5	6	7	8	Final
Wales (Tanner) 🔨	2	0	1	0	0	1	0	X	4
Turkey (Karataş)	0	1	0	4	2	0	4	X	11

Draw 15 12:00

Sheet B	1	2	3	4	5	6	7	8	Final
Germany (Kapp)	3	0	2	2	1	1	X	X	9
Estonia (Holm) 🔨	0	1	0	0	0	0	X	X	1

Draw 15 12:00

Sheet C	1	2	3	4	5	6	7	8	Final
Switzerland (Rios) 🔨	0	1	0	4	4	1	X	X	10
Croatia (Martinic)	1	0	1	0	0	0	X	X	2

Draw 16 16:00

Sheet E	1	2	3	4	5	6	7	8	Final
Turkey (Karataş) 🔨	2	0	4	0	2	0	X	X	8
Netherlands (Van Den Berg)	0	1	0	1	0	1	X	X	3

Draw 17 20:00

Sheet D	1	2	3	4	5	6	7	8	Final
Croatia (Martinic)	1	0	0	0	0	0	0	X	1
Germany (Kapp) 🔨	0	3	1	0	2	1	1	X	8

==== Wednesday, October 19 ====
Draw 18 08:00

Sheet D	1	2	3	4	5	6	7	8	Final
Slovenia (Culic)	0	1	0	0	0	0	X	X	1
Wales (Tanner) 🔨	3	0	2	1	1	1	X	X	8

Draw 20 16:00

Sheet B	1	2	3	4	5	6	7	8	Final
Netherlands (Van Den Berg)	0	1	0	1	0	1	0	X	3
Wales (Tanner) 🔨	2	0	3	0	2	0	1	X	8

Draw 20 16:00

Sheet E	1	2	3	4	5	6	7	8	Final
Switzerland (Rios)	2	0	1	1	2	2	X	X	8
Turkey (Karataş)	0	1	0	0	0	0	X	X	1

Draw 21 20:00

Sheet E	1	2	3	4	5	6	7	8	Final
Germany (Kapp)	3	0	3	1	0	0	0	X	7
Slovenia (Culic)	0	1	0	0	1	1	1	X	4

==== Thursday, October 20 ====
Draw 23 12:00

Sheet A	1	2	3	4	5	6	7	8	Final
Switzerland (Rios) 🔨	1	2	0	0	2	0	0	1	6
Slovenia (Culic)	0	0	1	1	0	0	2	0	4

Draw 23 12:00

Sheet B	1	2	3	4	5	6	7	8	Final
Turkey (Karataş) 🔨	2	0	1	0	0	0	1	0	4
Germany (Kapp)	0	0	0	0	2	1	0	3	6

Draw 23 12:00

Sheet C	1	2	3	4	5	6	7	8	Final
Wales (Tanner)	1	0	0	0	3	0	2	X	6
Estonia (Holm) 🔨	0	2	0	0	0	1	0	X	3

Draw 24 16:00

Sheet A	1	2	3	4	5	6	7	8	Final
Croatia (Martinic) 🔨	1	0	5	1	3	0	X	X	10
Netherlands (Van Den Berg)	0	1	0	0	0	1	X	X	2

== Tiebreaker ==
Thursday, October 20, 20:00

Sheet A	1	2	3	4	5	6	7	8	Final
England (Dunn) 🔨	1	0	1	0	3	0	0	0	5
Finland (Sepperi)	0	1	0	3	0	1	1	0	6

Sheet D	1	2	3	4	5	6	7	8	Final
Czech Republic (Bareš)	1	0	2	2	0	5	X	X	10
Denmark (Ostrowski) 🔨	0	1	0	0	2	0	X	X	3

== Playoffs ==
1/8 Finals
1	Sweden	8
16	New Zealand	6
8	Japan	5
9	Hungary	2
5	Scotland	4
12	United States	1
13	Czech Republic	2
4	Canada	6
3	Russia	9
14	Italy	1
6	Switzerland	7
11	Finland	1
7	Poland	4
10	South Korea	7
15	Turkey	1
2	Germany	10

Quarterfinals
Sweden	7
Japan	6
Scotland	6
Canada	5
Russia	4
Switzerland	3
South Korea	6
Germany	3

Semifinals
Sweden	8
Scotland	2
Russia	5
South Korea	2

Gold Medal Game
Sweden	4
Russia	5

Bronze Medal Game
Scotland	8
South Korea	4

=== 1/8 Finals ===
Friday, October 21, 09:30

Sheet A	1	2	3	4	5	6	7	8	Final
Canada (Lizmore) 🔨	3	0	0	0	2	1	0	X	6
Czech Republic (Bareš)	0	1	0	0	0	0	1	X	2

Sheet B	1	2	3	4	5	6	7	8	Final
Hungary (Kiss)	0	0	1	0	0	0	1	X	2
Japan (Okutsu) 🔨	0	2	0	1	1	1	0	X	5

Sheet C	1	2	3	4	5	6	7	8	Final
New Zealand (Sargon) 🔨	1	1	0	3	0	1	0	0	6
Sweden (Lindström)	0	0	2	0	2	0	2	2	8

Sheet D	1	2	3	4	5	6	7	8	Final
Scotland (Bryce) 🔨	0	3	0	1	0	0	0	X	4
United States (Maxie)	1	0	0	0	0	0	0	X	1

Friday, October 21, 13:30

Sheet A	1	2	3	4	5	6	7	8	Final
Turkey (Karataş)	0	0	1	0	0	0	X	X	1
Germany (Kapp) 🔨	0	2	0	4	3	1	X	X	10

Sheet B	1	2	3	4	5	6	7	8	Final
Poland (Augstyniak) 🔨	1	0	0	1	1	0	1	0	4
South Korea (Lee)	0	2	0	0	0	3	0	2	7

Sheet C	1	2	3	4	5	6	7	8	Final
Switzerland (Rios) 🔨	2	1	1	0	3	0	X	X	7
Finland (Sepperi)	0	0	0	1	0	0	X	X	1

Sheet D	1	2	3	4	5	6	7	8	Final
Italy (Pimpini)	0	0	0	0	1	0	X	X	1
Russia (Krushelnitskiy) 🔨	2	3	1	2	0	1	X	X	9

=== Quarterfinals ===
Friday, October 21, 19:00

Sheet A	1	2	3	4	5	6	7	8	Final
Japan (Okutsu) 🔨	1	0	1	0	1	0	2	1	6
Sweden (Lindström)	0	3	0	2	0	2	0	0	7

Sheet B	1	2	3	4	5	6	7	8	Final
Russia (Krushelnitskiy)	0	1	0	1	0	2	0	0	4
Switzerland (Rios) 🔨	3	0	0	0	0	0	0	0	3

Sheet C	1	2	3	4	5	6	7	8	Final
Scotland (Bryce)	2	0	0	1	0	1	0	2	6
Canada (Lizmore) 🔨	0	1	1	0	2	0	1	0	5

Sheet D	1	2	3	4	5	6	7	8	Final
Germany (Kapp) 🔨	0	2	0	0	0	1	0	X	3
South Korea (Lee)	0	0	3	1	0	0	2	X	6

=== Semifinals ===
Saturday, October 22, 09:00

Sheet A	1	2	3	4	5	6	7	8	Final
Russia (Krushelnitskiy) 🔨	2	0	0	2	0	0	1	X	5
South Korea (Lee)	0	0	1	0	0	1	0	X	2

Sheet B	1	2	3	4	5	6	7	8	Final
Scotland (Bryce) 🔨	0	0	0	1	0	1	0	X	2
Sweden (Lindström)	1	1	1	0	2	0	3	X	8

=== Bronze medal game ===
Saturday, October 22, 14:00

Sheet D	1	2	3	4	5	6	7	8	Final
Scotland (Bryce) 🔨	0	0	1	1	2	0	1	3	8
South Korea (Lee)	1	2	0	0	0	1	0	0	4

=== Gold medal game ===
Saturday, October 22, 14:00

Sheet C	1	2	3	4	5	6	7	8	9	Final
Russia (Krushelnitskiy) 🔨	0	1	0	2	0	0	1	0	1	5
Sweden (Lindström)	0	0	1	0	1	1	0	1	0	4
