= 2019 World Qualification Event =

- Host city: Naseby, New Zealand
- Arena: Maniototo Curling International
- Dates: January 18 – 23
- Men's winner: South Korea
- Skip: Kim Soo-hyuk
- Third: Jeong Byeong-jin
- Second: Lee Jeong-jae
- Lead: Lee Dong-hyeong
- Alternate: Hwang Hyeon-jun
- Finalist: Netherlands (van Dorp)
- Women's winner: China
- Skip: Mei Jie
- Fourth: Wang Rui
- Second: Yao Mingyue
- Lead: Ma Jingyi
- Alternate: Wang Meini
- Finalist: Finland (Kauste)

The 2019 World Qualification Event was held from January 18 to 23 at the Maniototo Curling International rink in Naseby, New Zealand. It was jointly hosted by Australia and New Zealand, with the New Zealand women's team taking one host berth and the Australia men's team the other.

South Korea and the Netherlands, the top two finishers in the men's division, qualified for the 2019 World Men's Curling Championship, while China and Finland qualified for the 2019 World Women's Curling Championship as the top two finishers in the women's division.

== Men ==
=== Qualification ===
The following nations qualified to participate in the 2019 World Qualification Event:

- Australia (host country)
- One team from the 2018 Americas Challenge
  - ~~Guyana~~
  - Brazil
- Four teams from the 2018 European Curling Championships
  - Netherlands
  - ~~Finland~~
  - England
  - Denmark
  - Poland
- Two teams from the 2018 Pacific-Asia Curling Championships
  - South Korea
  - New Zealand

Notes

Crossed-out teams qualified for this event on merit, but later withdrew and were replaced.

=== Teams ===
Australia	Brazil	Denmark	England
Fourth: Dean Hewitt; Third: Jay Merchant; Second: Tanner Davis; Skip: Ian Palangio	Skip: Marcelo Mello; Third: Michael Krahenbuhl; Second: Scott McMullan; Lead: Sergio Mitsuo Vilela; Alternate: Ricardo Losso	Skip: Ulrik Damm; Third: Kasper Wiksten; Second: Daniel Abrahamsen; Lead: Kasper Jørgensen; Alternate: Daniel Buchholt	Skip: Andrew Reed; Third: Michael Opel; Second: Jamie Malton; Lead: Thomas Jaeggi; Alternate: Gary Tapp
South Korea	Netherlands	New Zealand	Poland
Skip: Kim Soo-hyuk; Third: Jeong Byeong-jin; Second: Lee Jeong-jae; Lead: Lee Dong-hyeong; Alternate: Hwang Hyeon-jun	Fourth: Wouter Goesgens; Skip: Jaap van Dorp; Second: Laurens Hoekman; Lead: Carlo Glasbergen; Alternate: Alexander Magan	Skip: Scott Becker; Third: Sean Becker; Second: Anton Hood; Lead: Warren Dobson; Alternate: Simon Neilson	Skip: Borys Jasiecki; Third: Konrad Stych; Second: Krzysztof Domin; Lead: Bartosz Lobaza

=== Round-robin standings ===
Key
Teams to playoffs

Country	Skip	W	L
South Korea	Kim Soo-hyuk	6	1
England	Andrew Reed	5	2
Netherlands	Jaap van Dorp	5	2
New Zealand	Scott Becker	5	2
Poland	Borys Jasiecki	4	3
Australia	Ian Palangio	1	6
Denmark	Ulrik Damm	1	6
Brazil	Marcelo Mello	1	6

=== Round-robin results ===
All draw times are listed in New Zealand Daylight Time (UTC+13:00).

==== Draw 2 ====
Friday, January 18, 19:00

Sheet A	1	2	3	4	5	6	7	8	9	10	Final
New Zealand (Becker) 🔨	1	0	0	1	2	0	4	0	4	X	12
Australia (Palangio)	0	1	0	0	0	1	0	2	0	X	4

Sheet B	1	2	3	4	5	6	7	8	9	10	Final
South Korea (Kim) 🔨	0	0	2	0	0	1	1	0	3	X	7
Denmark (Damm)	0	0	0	0	1	0	0	1	0	X	2

Sheet C	1	2	3	4	5	6	7	8	9	10	Final
Brazil (Mello)	0	1	0	2	1	0	2	0	3	0	9
Poland (Jasiecki) 🔨	1	0	4	0	0	2	0	2	0	1	10

Sheet D	1	2	3	4	5	6	7	8	9	10	11	Final
Netherlands (van Dorp) 🔨	2	0	0	1	0	2	1	0	0	2	0	8
England (Reed)	0	1	1	0	1	0	0	2	3	0	1	9

==== Draw 4 ====
Saturday, January 19, 14:00

Sheet A	1	2	3	4	5	6	7	8	9	10	Final
Netherlands (van Dorp) 🔨	2	0	3	1	1	2	X	X	X	X	9
Denmark (Damm)	0	2	0	0	0	0	X	X	X	X	2

Sheet B	1	2	3	4	5	6	7	8	9	10	Final
New Zealand (Becker) 🔨	1	1	0	1	0	2	0	4	0	X	9
Poland (Jasiecki)	0	0	2	0	1	0	1	0	1	X	5

Sheet C	1	2	3	4	5	6	7	8	9	10	11	Final
Australia (Palangio)	0	2	0	4	0	1	0	1	0	3	0	11
England (Reed) 🔨	1	0	2	0	3	0	4	0	1	0	1	12

Sheet D	1	2	3	4	5	6	7	8	9	10	Final
Brazil (Mello)	0	2	0	1	0	1	0	0	X	X	4
South Korea (Kim) 🔨	3	0	3	0	2	0	1	2	X	X	11

==== Draw 6 ====
Sunday, January 20, 09:00

Sheet A	1	2	3	4	5	6	7	8	9	10	Final
England (Reed) 🔨	0	2	0	2	0	1	0	0	1	1	7
Poland (Jasiecki)	1	0	2	0	1	0	0	1	0	0	5

Sheet B	1	2	3	4	5	6	7	8	9	10	Final
Netherlands (van Dorp)	1	1	0	2	0	2	0	4	X	X	10
Brazil (Mello) 🔨	0	0	1	0	1	0	1	0	X	X	3

Sheet C	1	2	3	4	5	6	7	8	9	10	Final
New Zealand (Becker)	0	1	0	0	2	1	0	1	0	0	5
South Korea (Kim) 🔨	0	0	1	1	0	0	2	0	0	3	7

Sheet D	1	2	3	4	5	6	7	8	9	10	Final
Australia (Palangio)	0	0	1	0	0	0	0	1	1	X	3
Denmark (Damm) 🔨	0	2	0	1	0	1	1	0	0	X	5

==== Draw 8 ====
Sunday, January 20, 19:00

Sheet A	1	2	3	4	5	6	7	8	9	10	Final
Brazil (Mello)	0	0	0	1	0	2	X	X	X	X	3
New Zealand (Becker) 🔨	2	4	1	0	2	0	X	X	X	X	9

Sheet B	1	2	3	4	5	6	7	8	9	10	Final
Denmark (Damm) 🔨	0	0	0	1	0	1	0	X	X	X	2
England (Reed)	0	2	1	0	2	0	4	X	X	X	9

Sheet C	1	2	3	4	5	6	7	8	9	10	Final
Netherlands (van Dorp) 🔨	1	1	0	3	0	4	0	0	1	X	10
Australia (Palangio)	0	0	2	0	1	0	0	2	0	X	5

Sheet D	1	2	3	4	5	6	7	8	9	10	Final
South Korea (Kim)	0	2	0	2	0	0	2	0	4	X	10
Poland (Jasiecki) 🔨	1	0	1	0	1	1	0	1	0	X	5

==== Draw 10 ====
Monday, January 21, 14:00

Sheet A	1	2	3	4	5	6	7	8	9	10	Final
Australia (Palangio)	0	0	0	0	0	0	X	X	X	X	0
South Korea (Kim) 🔨	2	1	3	2	0	1	X	X	X	X	9

Sheet B	1	2	3	4	5	6	7	8	9	10	11	Final
Poland (Jasiecki) 🔨	2	0	1	0	0	1	0	0	0	1	1	6
Netherlands (van Dorp)	0	1	0	2	1	0	1	0	0	0	0	5

Sheet C	1	2	3	4	5	6	7	8	9	10	Final
England (Reed) 🔨	1	0	1	0	3	0	4	3	X	X	12
Brazil (Mello)	0	1	0	0	0	1	0	0	X	X	2

Sheet D	1	2	3	4	5	6	7	8	9	10	Final
Denmark (Damm)	0	0	0	0	2	0	X	X	X	X	2
New Zealand (Becker) 🔨	3	1	1	1	0	2	X	X	X	X	8

==== Draw 12 ====
Tuesday, January 22, 09:00

Sheet A	1	2	3	4	5	6	7	8	9	10	Final
Denmark (Damm) 🔨	0	1	0	0	4	0	0	0	0	X	5
Brazil (Mello)	1	0	1	0	0	1	2	1	5	X	11

Sheet B	1	2	3	4	5	6	7	8	9	10	Final
England (Reed)	1	0	1	0	2	0	1	0	0	0	5
New Zealand (Becker) 🔨	0	1	0	2	0	1	0	1	1	1	7

Sheet C	1	2	3	4	5	6	7	8	9	10	Final
South Korea (Kim)	0	0	1	0	2	0	1	0	2	0	6
Netherlands (van Dorp) 🔨	3	1	0	1	0	2	0	1	0	1	9

Sheet D	1	2	3	4	5	6	7	8	9	10	Final
Poland (Jasiecki)	3	1	0	1	0	1	1	0	3	X	10
Australia (Palangio) 🔨	0	0	2	0	2	0	0	1	0	X	5

==== Draw 14 ====
Tuesday, January 22, 19:00

Sheet A	1	2	3	4	5	6	7	8	9	10	Final
South Korea (Kim)	0	1	0	2	1	0	2	1	0	1	8
England (Reed) 🔨	1	0	1	0	0	3	0	0	1	0	6

Sheet B	1	2	3	4	5	6	7	8	9	10	Final
Brazil (Mello)	0	1	0	0	1	0	0	0	X	X	2
Australia (Palangio) 🔨	2	0	1	1	0	2	1	5	X	X	12

Sheet C	1	2	3	4	5	6	7	8	9	10	Final
Poland (Jasiecki) 🔨	3	2	0	3	0	1	4	X	X	X	13
Denmark (Damm)	0	0	1	0	3	0	0	X	X	X	4

Sheet D	1	2	3	4	5	6	7	8	9	10	Final
New Zealand (Becker)	0	1	0	0	0	1	0	X	X	X	2
Netherlands (van Dorp) 🔨	2	0	2	2	1	0	2	X	X	X	9

=== Playoffs ===
1 vs. 2
1	South Korea	7
2	England	3

Second place game
2	England	6
3	Netherlands	8

Qualify for World Championship
South Korea
Netherlands

==== 1 vs. 2 ====
Wednesday, January 23, 09:00

Sheet C	1	2	3	4	5	6	7	8	9	10	Final
South Korea (Kim) 🔨	3	0	1	0	0	3	0	0	X	X	7
England (Reed)	0	1	0	1	0	0	1	0	X	X	3

Winner qualifies for 2019 World Men's Curling Championship.

Loser advances to second place game.

==== Second place game ====
Wednesday, January 23, 14:00

Sheet B	1	2	3	4	5	6	7	8	9	10	Final
England (Reed) 🔨	1	0	1	0	0	2	0	0	1	1	6
Netherlands (van Dorp)	0	1	0	3	1	0	2	1	0	0	8

Winner qualifies for 2019 World Men's Curling Championship.

== Women ==
=== Qualification ===
The following nations qualified to participate in the 2019 World Qualification Event:

- New Zealand (host country)
- One team from the 2018 Americas Challenge
  - Brazil
- Four teams from the 2018 European Curling Championships
  - ~~Czech Republic~~
  - Finland
  - ~~Norway~~
  - Estonia
  - Hungary
  - Poland
- Two teams from the 2018 Pacific-Asia Curling Championships
  - China
  - Hong Kong

Notes

Crossed-out teams qualified for this event on merit, but later withdrew and were replaced.

=== Teams ===
Brazil	China	Estonia	Finland
Skip: Anne Shibuya; Third: Luciana Barrella; Second: Alessandra Barros; Lead: Débora Monteiro	Fourth: Wang Rui; Skip: Mei Jie; Second: Yao Mingyue; Lead: Ma Jingyi; Alternate: Wang Meini	Skip: Marie Turmann; Third: Kerli Laidsalu; Second: Triin Madisson; Lead: Erika Tuvike	Skip: Oona Kauste; Third: Eszter Juhász; Second: Maija Salmiovirta; Lead: Lotta Immonen
Hong Kong	Hungary	New Zealand	Poland
Skip: Ling-Yue Hung; Third: Julie Morrison; Second: Ada Shang; Lead: Ashura Wong; Alternate: Grace Bugg	Skip: Dorottya Palancsa; Fourth: Henrietta Miklai; Second: Nikolett Sándor; Lead: Orsolya Rokusfalvy; Alternate: Dorottya Micheller	Skip: Bridget Becker; Third: Natalie Thurlow; Second: Abby Peddie; Lead: Eloise Pointon; Alternate: Jessica Smith	Skip: Marta Pluta; Third: Ewa Nogły; Second: Justyna Wojtas; Lead: Marta Święszek

=== Round-robin standings ===
Key
Teams to playoffs

Country	Skip	W	L
Finland	Oona Kauste	7	0
China	Mei Jie	6	1
Hungary	Dorottya Palancsa	5	2
Brazil	Anne Shibuya	3	4
Estonia	Marie Turmann	3	4
Hong Kong	Ling-Yue Hung	2	5
Poland	Marta Pluta	2	5
New Zealand	Bridget Becker	0	7

=== Round-robin results ===
All draw times are listed in New Zealand Daylight Time (UTC+13:00).

==== Draw 1 ====
Friday, January 18, 15:00

Sheet A	1	2	3	4	5	6	7	8	9	10	Final
Brazil (Shibuya) 🔨	1	1	0	0	2	2	0	1	2	1	10
Estonia (Turmann)	0	0	3	1	0	0	2	0	0	0	6

Sheet B	1	2	3	4	5	6	7	8	9	10	Final
Poland (Pluta)	0	2	0	0	1	0	2	0	0	X	5
Hungary (Palancsa) 🔨	2	0	1	0	0	3	0	2	3	X	11

Sheet C	1	2	3	4	5	6	7	8	9	10	11	Final
Hong Kong (Hung) 🔨	1	0	0	0	1	0	3	0	1	1	0	7
Finland (Kauste)	0	1	3	0	0	2	0	1	0	0	1	8

Sheet D	1	2	3	4	5	6	7	8	9	10	Final
China (Mei) 🔨	0	1	0	2	1	0	3	5	X	X	12
New Zealand (Becker)	1	0	3	0	0	1	0	0	X	X	5

==== Draw 3 ====
Saturday, January 19, 09:00

Sheet A	1	2	3	4	5	6	7	8	9	10	Final
China (Mei)	0	4	2	0	2	0	0	0	2	X	10
Hungary (Palancsa) 🔨	1	0	0	2	0	1	1	1	0	X	6

Sheet B	1	2	3	4	5	6	7	8	9	10	Final
Brazil (Shibuya)	0	0	0	0	1	1	0	X	X	X	2
Finland (Kauste) 🔨	2	0	1	4	0	0	3	X	X	X	10

Sheet C	1	2	3	4	5	6	7	8	9	10	Final
Estonia (Turmann) 🔨	0	1	0	2	1	1	2	0	0	1	8
New Zealand (Becker)	1	0	1	0	0	0	0	2	1	0	5

Sheet D	1	2	3	4	5	6	7	8	9	10	Final
Hong Kong (Hung)	0	1	0	1	1	0	2	0	3	1	9
Poland (Pluta) 🔨	1	0	3	0	0	2	0	1	0	0	7

==== Draw 5 ====
Saturday, January 19, 19:00

Sheet A	1	2	3	4	5	6	7	8	9	10	Final
New Zealand (Becker)	0	1	1	0	1	0	3	0	0	X	6
Finland (Kauste) 🔨	2	0	0	3	0	1	0	2	1	X	9

Sheet B	1	2	3	4	5	6	7	8	9	10	Final
China (Mei) 🔨	2	1	1	1	2	0	2	0	X	X	9
Hong Kong (Hung)	0	0	0	0	0	1	0	1	X	X	2

Sheet C	1	2	3	4	5	6	7	8	9	10	Final
Brazil (Shibuya) 🔨	0	1	1	0	1	0	1	1	0	0	5
Poland (Pluta)	2	0	0	2	0	1	0	0	0	1	6

Sheet D	1	2	3	4	5	6	7	8	9	10	Final
Estonia (Turmann)	1	0	1	0	0	0	0	0	0	X	2
Hungary (Palancsa) 🔨	0	2	0	1	1	1	2	1	1	X	9

==== Draw 7 ====
Sunday, January 20, 14:00

Sheet A	1	2	3	4	5	6	7	8	9	10	Final
Hong Kong (Hung)	2	1	0	1	0	0	0	0	1	0	5
Brazil (Shibuya) 🔨	0	0	2	0	1	1	1	1	0	1	7

Sheet B	1	2	3	4	5	6	7	8	9	10	Final
Hungary (Palancsa) 🔨	1	0	0	1	0	0	2	2	1	1	8
New Zealand (Becker)	0	0	1	0	1	4	0	0	0	0	6

Sheet C	1	2	3	4	5	6	7	8	9	10	Final
China (Mei) 🔨	4	2	0	2	3	1	X	X	X	X	12
Estonia (Turmann)	0	0	1	0	0	0	X	X	X	X	1

Sheet D	1	2	3	4	5	6	7	8	9	10	Final
Poland (Pluta) 🔨	2	0	0	1	0	1	0	0	0	X	4
Finland (Kauste)	0	3	3	0	2	0	0	1	0	X	9

==== Draw 9 ====
Monday, January 21, 09:00

Sheet A	1	2	3	4	5	6	7	8	9	10	Final
Estonia (Turmann) 🔨	4	0	3	2	0	0	0	6	X	X	15
Poland (Pluta)	0	1	0	0	2	1	1	0	X	X	5

Sheet B	1	2	3	4	5	6	7	8	9	10	Final
Finland (Kauste)	0	0	2	0	4	0	0	0	2	0	8
China (Mei) 🔨	0	2	0	1	0	1	0	1	0	1	6

Sheet C	1	2	3	4	5	6	7	8	9	10	Final
New Zealand (Becker)	0	1	0	3	0	1	0	2	0	0	7
Hong Kong (Hung) 🔨	1	0	2	0	2	0	1	0	1	1	8

Sheet D	1	2	3	4	5	6	7	8	9	10	Final
Hungary (Palancsa)	0	0	1	0	2	0	0	3	0	2	8
Brazil (Shibuya) 🔨	1	1	0	1	0	1	1	0	1	0	6

==== Draw 11 ====
Monday, January 21, 19:00

Sheet A	1	2	3	4	5	6	7	8	9	10	Final
Hungary (Palancsa)	0	2	3	0	1	2	2	2	X	X	12
Hong Kong (Hung) 🔨	2	0	0	1	0	0	0	0	X	X	3

Sheet B	1	2	3	4	5	6	7	8	9	10	Final
New Zealand (Becker) 🔨	2	2	0	1	0	0	0	1	0	0	6
Brazil (Shibuya)	0	0	2	0	1	2	1	0	1	1	8

Sheet C	1	2	3	4	5	6	7	8	9	10	Final
Poland (Pluta) 🔨	1	0	0	0	0	1	1	0	X	X	3
China (Mei)	0	2	1	1	1	0	0	4	X	X	9

Sheet D	1	2	3	4	5	6	7	8	9	10	Final
Finland (Kauste)	0	0	0	3	0	2	0	1	0	2	8
Estonia (Turmann) 🔨	0	1	1	0	1	0	1	0	1	0	5

==== Draw 13 ====
Tuesday, January 22, 14:00

Sheet A	1	2	3	4	5	6	7	8	9	10	Final
Poland (Pluta) 🔨	0	4	3	0	1	0	0	0	0	2	10
New Zealand (Becker)	2	0	0	2	0	2	1	1	1	0	9

Sheet B	1	2	3	4	5	6	7	8	9	10	Final
Hong Kong (Hung)	0	2	0	1	0	0	1	0	X	X	4
Estonia (Turmann) 🔨	3	0	2	0	0	4	0	1	X	X	10

Sheet C	1	2	3	4	5	6	7	8	9	10	Final
Finland (Kauste)	0	0	0	1	0	2	1	0	2	X	6
Hungary (Palancsa) 🔨	0	0	1	0	1	0	0	2	0	X	4

Sheet D	1	2	3	4	5	6	7	8	9	10	Final
Brazil (Shibuya)	0	0	1	0	0	0	X	X	X	X	1
China (Mei) 🔨	1	1	0	2	4	1	X	X	X	X	9

=== Playoffs ===
1 vs. 2
1	Finland	3
2	China	4

Second place game
1	Finland	8
3	Hungary	1

Qualify for World Championship
China
Finland

==== 1 vs. 2 ====
Wednesday, January 23, 09:00

Sheet B	1	2	3	4	5	6	7	8	9	10	Final
Finland (Kauste) 🔨	0	0	1	0	0	1	0	1	0	0	3
China (Mei)	0	0	0	1	1	0	1	0	0	1	4

Winner qualifies for 2019 World Women's Curling Championship.

Loser advances to second place game.

==== Second place game ====
Wednesday, January 23, 14:00

Sheet C	1	2	3	4	5	6	7	8	9	10	Final
Finland (Kauste) 🔨	1	1	1	1	0	2	1	1	X	X	8
Hungary (Palancsa)	0	0	0	0	1	0	0	0	X	X	1

Winner qualifies for 2019 World Women's Curling Championship.
