= 2018 Americas Challenge (January) =

2018 Canada-Brazil Challenge
- Host city: London, Ontario
- Arena: Western Fair Sports Centre
- Dates: January 11 – 13
- Winner: Canada
- Skip: Glenn Howard
- Third: Adam Spencer
- Second: David Mathers
- Lead: Scott Howard
- Finalist: Brazil (Marcelo Mello)

The 2018 Americas Challenge was a curling challenge that took place from January 11 to 13 at the Western Fair Sports Centre in London, Ontario. The challenge round determined which nation would qualify to the last Americas Zone spot at the 2018 World Men's Curling Championship. Brazil and Canada played a best-of-five series to determine the winner in the men's event.

The Challenge was held concurrently with the 2018 Continental Cup of Curling, the first time it was held on arena ice and not at a dedicated curling facility.

== Background ==
The World Curling Federation allots two spots at the World Men's Curling Championship to the Americas Zone, which are normally taken by Canada and the United States. However, the World Curling Federation allows for other member nations in the Americas Zone (i.e. Brazil) to challenge Canada and/or the United States for berths to the World Championships. As hosts, the United States receive an automatic berth to the 2018 World Men's Championships. Thus, Brazil is allowed to challenge Canada for a berth to the 2018 World Championships. This will be Brazil's first men's challenge of Canada; it had unsuccessfully challenged the United States in 2017, 2015, 2010 and 2009.

== Men's event ==
=== Teams ===
The teams are listed as follows:

Nation	Skip	Third	Second	Lead	Alternate	Club
Brazil	Marcelo Mello	Scott McMullan	Márcio Cerquinho	Filipe Nunes	Sérgio Mitsuo Vilela	Club de curling Sherbrooke, Sherbrooke, Quebec
Canada	Glenn Howard	Adam Spencer	David Mathers	Scott Howard		St. George's Golf and Country Club, Etobicoke, Ontario

=== Results ===
==== Game 1 ====
Thursday, January 11, 19:00

Sheet c	1	2	3	4	5	6	7	8	9	10	Final
Canada (Howard)	7	3	0	1	1	0	3	X	X	X	15
Brazil (Mello)	0	0	0	0	0	1	0	X	X	X	1

==== Game 2 ====
Friday, January 12, 14:30

Team	1	2	3	4	5	6	7	8	9	10	Final
Canada (Howard)	0	3	0	2	1	0	2	0	X	X	8
Brazil (Mello)	0	0	1	0	0	1	0	1	X	X	3

==== Game 3 ====
Friday, January 12, 19:00

Team	1	2	3	4	5	6	7	8	9	10	Final
Canada (Howard)	0	2	1	0	0	2	1	0	0	X	6
Brazil (Mello)	0	0	0	1	1	0	0	0	1	X	3
