= 2017 Brazilian Mixed Doubles Curling Championship =

2017 Campeonato Brasileiro de Curling de Duplas Mistas (2017 Brazilian Mixed Doubles Curling Championship)
- Host city: Toronto, Ontario
- Arena: Royal Canadian Curling Club
- Dates: November 15–19, 2017
- Winner: Aline Lima / Marcio Cerquinho
- Curling club: Royal Canadian Curling Club
- Finalist: Alessandra Barros / Scott McMullan

The 2017 Brazilian Mixed Doubles Curling Championship (Portuguese: 2017 Campeonato Brasileiro de Curling de Duplas Mistas) were held from November 15 to 19, 2017 at the Royal Canadian Curling Club in Toronto, Ontario. Tournament were held in 3rd time.

== Teams ==
Woman	Men
Thaisa Adrover	Sergio Mitsuo Vilela
Luciana Barrella	Marcelo Mello
Alessandra Barros	Scott McMullan
Aline Lima	Marcio Cerquinho
Raissa Rodrigues	Marcio Rodrigues
Anne Shibuya	Claudio Alves

== Round robin ==
Key
Teams to Playoffs

	Team	1	2	3	4	5	6	Wins	Losses	Place
1	Thaisa Adrover / Sergio Mitsuo Vilela	*	5:9	3:6	1:12	10:6	9:2	2	3	4
2	Luciana Barrella / Marcelo Mello	9:5	*	9:2	4:7	11:3	8:4	4	1	2
3	Alessandra Barros / Scott McMullan	6:3	2:9	*	10:7	9:3	6:5	4	1	3
4	Aline Lima / Marcio Cerquinho	12:1	7:4	7:10	*	9:3	8:1	4	1	1
5	Raissa Rodrigues / Marcio Rodrigues	6:10	3:11	3:9	3:9	*	5:8	0	5	6
6	Anne Shibuya / Claudio Alves	2:9	4:8	5:6	1:8	8:5	*	1	4	5

== Playoffs ==
Page playoffs
1	Aline Lima / Marcio Cerquinho	7
2	Luciana Barrella / Marcelo Mello	5
3	Alessandra Barros / Scott McMullan	8
4	Thaisa Adrover / Sergio Mitsuo Vilela	1

Semifinal
Luciana Barrella / Marcelo Mello	7
Alessandra Barros / Scott McMullan	9

Final
Aline Lima / Marcio Cerquinho	8
Alessandra Barros / Scott McMullan	2

=== Page playoffs ===
Friday, November 17, 1:00 pm

1 vs 2

Team	1	2	3	4	5	6	7	8	Final
Aline Lima / Marcio Cerquinho 🔨	4	0	0	2	1	0	0	X	7
Luciana Barrella / Marcelo Mello	0	2	1	0	0	1	1	X	5

3 vs 4

Team	1	2	3	4	5	6	7	8	Final
Alessandra Barros / Scott McMullan 🔨	2	1	0	2	1	1	1	X	8
Thaisa Adrover / Sergio Mitsuo Vilela	0	0	1	0	0	0	0	X	1

=== Semifinal ===
Saturday, November 18, 10:00 am

Team	1	2	3	4	5	6	7	8	Final
Luciana Barrella / Marcelo Mello 🔨	0	0	1	0	5	0	1	0	7
Alessandra Barros / Scott McMullan	1	2	0	3	0	2	0	1	9

=== Final ===
Saturday, November 18, 5:00 pm

Team	1	2	3	4	5	6	7	8	Final
Aline Lima / Marcio Cerquinho 🔨	4	1	0	2	1	0	X	X	8
Alessandra Barros / Scott McMullan	0	0	1	0	0	1	X	X	2

== Final standings ==
Place	Team (woman / man)	Games played	Wins	Losses
1st place, gold medalist(s)	Aline Lima / Marcio Cerquinho	7	6	1
2nd place, silver medalist(s)	Alessandra Barros / Scott McMullan	8	6	2
3rd place, bronze medalist(s)	Luciana Barrella / Marcelo Mello	7	4	3
4	Thaisa Adrover / Sergio Mitsuo Vilela	6	2	4
5	Anne Shibuya / Claudio Alves	5	1	4
6	Raissa Rodrigues / Marcio Rodrigues	5	0	5
