= 2018 Americas Challenge (November) =

- Host city: Chaska, Minnesota
- Arena: Chaska Curling Club
- Dates: November 16–18
- Winner: United States
- Skip: Rich Ruohonen
- Fourth: Greg Persinger
- Second: Colin Hufman
- Lead: Phil Tilker
- Alternate: Korey Dropkin
- Finalist: Guyana (Husain)

The 2018 Americas Challenge was a curling challenge that took place from November 16 to 18 at the Chaska Curling Club in Chaska, Minnesota, United States.

This was the first time the Americas Challenge had three teams competing, with Guyana making their first appearance. The winner will be the second team from the Americas zone to qualify for the 2019 World Men's Curling Championship (Canada qualifies automatically as the host). The second-placed team will qualify for the 2019 World Qualification Event, a further chance to qualify for the men's world championship.

The United States went undefeated to qualify for the World Men's Curling Championship. Guyana's debut was a success, as while they lost both of their games to the US, they beat Brazil twice to secure second place and a spot in the World Qualification Event.

A women's event was scheduled with Brazil taking on the United States, but Brazil chose to concede, going straight to the 2019 World Qualification Event.

== Format ==
The teams played a double round robin to determine the winner of the challenge. In the case of a tie, head-to-head score or shootout score will be used to determine the winner.

== Teams ==
Country	Skip	Third	Second	Lead	Alternate
Brazil	Marcelo Mello	Michael Krahenbuhl	Scott McMullan	Sergio Vilela	
Guyana	Rayad Husain	Jason Perreira	Daniel Toolsie	Baul Persaud	
United States	Greg Persinger (Fourth)	Rich Ruohonen (Skip)	Colin Hufman	Phil Tilker	Korey Dropkin

== Standings ==
Key
Team to 2019 World Men's Curling Championship
Team to 2019 World Qualification Event

Country	Skip	W	L
United States	Rich Ruohonen	4	0
Guyana	Rayad Husain	2	2
Brazil	Marcelo Mello	0	4

== Results ==
All draw times are listed in Central Standard Time (UTC−06:00).

=== Game 1 ===
Friday, November 16, 19:00

Team	1	2	3	4	5	6	7	8	9	10	Final
United States (Ruohonen) 🔨	1	1	3	1	2	0	2	X	X	X	10
Brazil (Mello)	0	0	0	0	0	1	0	X	X	X	1

=== Game 2 ===
Saturday, November 17, 09:00

Team	1	2	3	4	5	6	7	8	9	10	Final
Guyana (Husain)	0	0	0	0	0	2	X	X	X	X	2
United States (Ruohonen) 🔨	3	5	2	3	0	0	X	X	X	X	13

=== Game 3 ===
Saturday, November 17, 14:00

Team	1	2	3	4	5	6	7	8	9	10	11	Final
Brazil (Mello)	0	2	3	0	0	2	0	1	0	1	0	9
Guyana (Husain) 🔨	1	0	0	2	2	0	2	0	2	0	1	10

=== Game 4 ===
Saturday, November 17, 19:00

Team	1	2	3	4	5	6	7	8	9	10	Final
Brazil (Mello) 🔨	1	0	0	0	0	0	X	X	X	X	1
United States (Ruohonen)	0	1	1	1	3	2	X	X	X	X	8

=== Game 5 ===
Sunday, November 18, 08:00

Team	1	2	3	4	5	6	7	8	9	10	Final
United States (Ruohonen)	2	0	0	5	0	2	X	X	X	X	9
Guyana (Husain)	0	1	1	0	1	0	X	X	X	X	3

=== Game 6 ===
Sunday, November 18, 13:00

Team	1	2	3	4	5	6	7	8	9	10	Final
Guyana (Husain) 🔨	1	0	2	0	0	0	1	0	0	4	8
Brazil (Mello)	0	1	0	0	1	1	0	2	2	0	7
