= Alessandra Barros =

Brazilian curler

- Curler
- Born: January 3, 1979 (age 47); Brasília, Brazil

Team
- Curling club: Vancouver CC, Vancouver, BC
- Skip: Anne Shibuya
- Third: Luciana Barrella
- Second: Alessandra Barros
- Lead: Debora Monteiro
- Coach: Barbara Zbeetnoff

Curling career
- Other appearances: World Mixed Curling Championship: 1 (2016); World Qualification Event: 1 (2019)

Alessandra Barros (born January 3, 1979, in Brasília) is a Brazilian curler. She currently plays second for the Vancouver, British Columbia-based National Brazilian team.

== Teams ==
=== Women's ===
Season	Skip	Third	Second	Lead	Alternate	Coach	Events
2016–17	Aline Gonçalves	Isis Oliveira	Alessandra Barros	Anne Shibuya	Luciana Barrella	Robbie Gallaugher	2017 AC (silver)
2018–19	Anne Shibuya	Luciana Barrella	Alessandra Barros	Debora Monteiro		Barbara Zbeetnoff	WQE 2019 (4th)

=== Mixed ===
Season	Skip	Third	Second	Lead	Events
2016–17	Raphael Monticello	Alessandra Barros	Marcio Cerquinho	Luciana Barrella	WMxCC 2016 (33rd)

=== Mixed doubles ===
Season	Female	Male	Events
2016–17	Alessandra Barros	Sérgio Mitsuo Vilela	BMDCC 2016 (4th)
2017–18	Alessandra Barros	Scott McMullan	BMDCC 2017 (silver)

== Personal life ==
Barros resides in Vancouver, British Columbia, Canada. Her daughter Giovanna Barros is also a curler, competed for Brazil on 2016 Winter Youth Olympics.
