= Luciana Barrella =

Brazilian female curler

- Curler
- Born: December 23, 1978 (age 47); Manaus, Brazil

Team
- Curling club: Vancouver CC; Vancouver, BC
- Skip: Anne Shibuya
- Third: Luciana Barrella
- Second: Sarah Lippi
- Lead: Isabelle Campos
- Alternate: Marcelia Melo

Curling career
- Member Association: Brazil
- World Mixed Doubles Championship: 1 (2019)
- Pan Continental Championship: 2 (2022, 2023)
- Other appearances: World Mixed Curling Championship: 4 (2015, 2016, 2017, 2018)

Luciana Reis Barrella (born December 23, 1978, in Manaus) is a Brazilian female curler. She currently plays for the Vancouver, British Columbia-based national Brazilian team. She is right-handed.

Barrella and Marcio Cerquinho played at the 2019 World Mixed Doubles Curling Championship.

== Teams ==
=== Women's ===
Season	Skip	Third	Second	Lead	Alternate	Coach	Events
2016–17	Aline Gonçalves	Isis Oliveira	Alessandra Barros	Anne Shibuya	Luciana Barrella	Robbie Gallaugher	2017 AC (silver)
2018–19	Anne Shibuya	Luciana Barrella	Alessandra Barros	Debora Monteiro		Barbara Zbeetnoff	WQE 2019 (4th)

=== Mixed ===
Season	Skip	Third	Second	Lead	Coach	Events
2015–16	Marcelo Mello	Luciana Barrella	Sergio Mitsuo Vilela	Isis Oliveira	Jean-Pierre Ruetsche	WMxCC 2015 (35th)
2016–17	Raphael Monticello	Alessandra Barros	Marcio Cerquinho	Luciana Barrella		WMxCC 2016 (33rd)
2017–18	Marcelo Mello	Aline Gonçalves	Sergio Mitsuo Vilela	Luciana Barrella	Nicole Gluekler	WMxCC 2017 (30th)
2018–19	Anne Shibuya	Claudio Alves	Luciana Barrella	Erick Santos	Matthew Gervan	WMxCC 2018 (33rd)

=== Mixed doubles ===
Season	Female	Male	Coach	Events
2016–17	Luciana Barrella	Scott McMullan		BMDCC 2016 (4th)
2017–18	Luciana Barrella	Marcelo Mello		BMDCC 2017 (silver)
2018–19	Luciana Barrella	Marcio Cerquinho	Wade Scoffin	WMDCC 2019 (26th)
