= 2017 Americas Challenge =

- Host city: Duluth, Minnesota
- Arena: Duluth Curling Club
- Dates: January 27 – 29
- Men's winner: United States
- Skip: John Shuster
- Third: Tyler George
- Second: Matt Hamilton
- Lead: John Landsteiner
- Alternate: Joe Polo
- Finalist: Brazil (Marcelo Mello)
- Women's winner: United States
- Skip: Nina Roth
- Third: Tabitha Peterson
- Second: Aileen Geving
- Lead: Becca Hamilton
- Alternate: Cory Christensen
- Finalist: Brazil (Aline Gonçalves)

The 2017 Americas Challenge was a curling challenge taking place from January 27 to 29 at the Duluth Curling Club in Duluth, Minnesota. The challenge round was held to determine which nation would qualify for the last Americas Zone spot at the 2017 Ford World Men's Curling Championship and the 2017 World Women's Curling Championship. Brazil and the United States played a best-of-five series to determine the winner in both the men's and women's event.

== Background ==
The World Curling Federation allots two spots at the World Men's Curling Championship to the Americas Zone, which are normally taken by Canada and the United States. However, the World Curling Federation allows for other member nations in the Americas Zone (i.e. Brazil) to challenge Canada and/or the United States for berths to the World Championships. As hosts, Canada received an automatic berth to the 2017 World Men's Championships. Canada finished higher than the United States at the 2016 Ford World Women's Curling Championship, and thus received an automatic berth to the 2017 World Women's Championships, meaning Brazil was allowed to challenge the United States rather than Canada for a berth to the 2017 World Championships. This was Brazil's fourth men's challenge of the United States, after challenges in 2015, 2010 and 2009 proved to be unsuccessful. This was the first women's Americas Challenge.

== Men's event ==
=== Teams ===
The teams are listed as follows:

Nation	Skip	Third	Second	Lead	Alternate	Locale
Brazil	Marcelo Mello	Márcio Cerquinho	Scott McMullan	Filipe Nunes	Sergio Mitsuo Vilela	São Paulo
United States	John Shuster	Tyler George	Matt Hamilton	John Landsteiner	Joe Polo	Duluth

=== Results ===
==== Game 1 ====
Friday, January 27, 14:30

Team	1	2	3	4	5	6	7	8	9	10	Final
United States (Shuster) 🔨	1	0	2	0	2	1	0	2	0	X	8
Brazil (Mello)	0	1	0	1	0	0	2	0	2	X	6

==== Game 2 ====
Friday, January 27, 19:30

Team	1	2	3	4	5	6	7	8	9	10	Final
United States (Shuster) 🔨	4	0	0	2	0	1	0	2	X	X	9
Brazil (Mello)	0	1	1	0	1	0	1	0	X	X	4

==== Game 3 ====
Saturday, January 28, 11:00

Team	1	2	3	4	5	6	7	8	9	10	Final
United States (Shuster) 🔨	3	0	0	0	2	1	0	3	X	X	9
Brazil (Mello)	0	0	0	1	0	0	2	0	X	X	3

United States advanced to the World Championship.

== Women's event ==
=== Teams ===
The teams are listed as follows:

Nation	Skip	Third	Second	Lead	Alternate	Locale
Brazil	Aline Gonçalves	Isis Oliveira	Alessandra Barros	Anne Shibuya	Luciana Barrella	São Paulo
United States	Nina Roth	Tabitha Peterson	Aileen Geving	Becca Hamilton	Cory Christensen	Blaine

=== Results ===
==== Game 1 ====
Friday, January 27, 14:30

Team	1	2	3	4	5	6	7	8	9	10	Final
United States (Roth) 🔨	2	0	5	1	0	8	X	X	X	X	16
Brazil (Gonçalves)	0	1	0	0	1	0	X	X	X	X	2

==== Game 2 ====
Friday, January 27, 19:30

Team	1	2	3	4	5	6	7	8	9	10	Final
United States (Roth)	1	4	0	4	1	0	2	X	X	X	12
Brazil (Gonçalves) 🔨	0	0	1	0	0	1	0	X	X	X	2

==== Game 3 ====
Saturday, January 28, 11:00

Team	1	2	3	4	5	6	7	8	9	10	Final
United States (Roth) 🔨	0	3	0	2	0	2	0	1	0	0	8
Brazil (Gonçalves)	1	0	1	0	2	0	1	0	1	1	7

United States advanced to the World Championship.
