= 2010 USA-Brazil Challenge =

2010 Americas Challenge
- Host city: Grafton, North Dakota
- Arena: Grafton Curling Club
- Dates: February 5–7
- Winner: United States
- Skip: Pete Fenson
- Third: Shawn Rojeski
- Second: Joe Polo
- Lead: Tyler George
- Finalist: Brazil (Marcelo Mello)

The 2010 USA - Brazil Challenge was held February 5–7, 2010 at the Grafton Curling Club in Grafton, North Dakota. The challenge pitted the Brazilian National Curling Team against the Pete Fenson rink of Bemidji, Minnesota, representing the United States. The winning team represented the second Americas team at the 2010 Capital One World Men's Curling Championship.

The series was a best-of-five.

== Teams ==
Nation	Skip	Third	Second	Lead
Brazil	Marcelo Mello	Celso Kossaka	Luis Augusto Silva	Filipe Nunes
United States	Pete Fenson	Shawn Rojeski	Joe Polo	Tyler George

== Results ==
=== Game 1 ===
Sheet B	1	2	3	4	5	6	7	8	9	10	Final
Brazil (Mello)	1	0	1	0	0	1	0	X	X	X	3
United States (Fenson)	0	3	0	3	0	0	4	X	X	X	10

=== Game 2 ===
Sheet B	1	2	3	4	5	6	7	8	9	10	Final
United States (Fenson)	1	0	3	0	2	2	X	X	X	X	8
Brazil (Mello)	0	0	0	1	0	0	X	X	X	X	1

=== Game 3 ===
Sheet C	1	2	3	4	5	6	7	8	9	10	Final
United States (Fenson)	1	2	0	3	0	2	X	X	X	X	8
Brazil (Mello)	0	0	1	0	1	0	X	X	X	X	2
