= Latvian Women's Volleyball League =

Latvian Volleyball League
- Current season, competition or edition: 2020–21 Latvian Volleyball Women's League
- Sport: Volleyball
- Founded: 1991
- First season: 1992
- Administrator: LVF
- No. of teams: 4 (2020–21)
- Country: Latvia
- Continent: Europe
- Most recent champion: Jelgava/LU(10th title)
- Most titles: Jelgava/LU (10 titles)
- Level on pyramid: 1
- Relegation to: 2nd League
- Domestic cups: Latvian Cup; Latvian Super Cup
- International cups: CEV Champions League; CEV Cup; CEV Challenge Cup

The Latvian Women's Volleyball League is the most important Latvian women's volleyball competition organized by the Latvian Volleyball Federation (Latvijas Volejbola Federācija, LVF), it was established in 1992 just after the dissolution of the Soviet Union.

== History ==
In the 2020/21 season 4 teams took part in the drawing of the national league: "Rigas VS" ( Riga ), "Jelgava", RSU-MVS ( Riga ), "MiLATss" ( Daugavpils ). The champion's title was won by "Jelgava", which won the final series "Rigas VS" 2-1 (3: 1, 0: 3, 3: 2). 3rd place was taken by RSU-MVS.

=== List of champions ===
Years	Champions	Runners up	Third place
1992	Aurora Riga		
1993	Aurora Riga		
1994	Kimikis Daugavpils		
1995	Kimikis Daugavpils		
1996	Kimikis Daugavpils		
1997	Kimikis Daugavpils		
1998	Kimikis Daugavpils		
1999	Kimikis Daugavpils		
2000	Kimikis Daugavpils		
2001	Speks-R Riga		
2002	Speks-R Riga		
2003	Speks-R Riga		
2004	SVK Ezerzeme Daugavpils	Speks-R Riga	LU/JRSC
2005	Speks-R Riga		
2006	SVK Rīga		
2007	SVK Rīga	Jelgava/LU	MSĢ
2008	SVK Rīga	MSĢ-Ropaži	Jelgava/LU
2009	Jelgava/LU	SVK Rīga	VK Ropaži/MSĢ
2010	Jelgava/LU	SVK Rīga	VK Ropaži/MSĢ
2011	Jelgava/LU	VK Ropaži/MSĢ	Lettonie junior
2012	Jelgava/LU		
2013	Jelgava/LU	SK Babīte	Lettonie junior
2014	Jelgava/LU	RSU / MVS	SK Babīte
2015	Jelgava/LU	Zeltaleja	SK Babīte
2016	Jelgava/LU	Zeltaleja/MSĢ	SK Babīte
2017	RSU / MVS	SK Babīte	Jelgava/LU
2018	SK Babīte	VK Jelgava	VK "miLATss"
2019	Rīgas Volejbola skola	Zeltaleja/MSĢ	VK "miLATss"
2020	Not Finished		
