= Moldovan Women's Volleyball League =

Volleyball competition in Moldova

- Current season, competition or edition: 2022–23
- Sport: Volleyball
- Founded: 1993
- First season: 1993
- Administrator: Moldovan Volleyball Federation
- No. of teams: 8 Teams
- Country: Moldova
- Continent: Europe
- Domestic cups: Moldovan Cup; Moldovan Super Cup
- International cups: CEV Champions League; CEV Cup; CEV Challenge Cup
- Website: Moldovan Volleyball Federation

The Moldavan (Moldova) Women's Volleyball Championship is an annual competition of women's volleyball teams in Moldova. It has been held since 1993 (irregularly in the 1990s) just after the dissolution of the Soviet Union State. Since the 2014/15 season it is held under the "fall-spring" system.

== Competition formula ==
The 2021/2022 Championship consisted of two phases - preliminary and playoffs. In the preliminary stage the teams played in two rounds. According to the results, the 4 best teams qualify for the playoffs and then a knock-out system determined the two finalists, who will play for the championship. The series of playoff matches were played until two (semi-finals) or until three for the (finals). Eight teams took part in the championship 2021/22: "Dinamo-MAI" (Chisinau), "Dinamo-Gloria" (Tiraspol), "UTM-Politeh" (Chisinau), "Gamma-Sind" (Cahul), "Speranza" (Chisinau), SDYUSHOR-12 (Vadul-lui-Voda), "Tighina-SSH #2" (Bender), HMSC (Chisinau). The champion's title was won by "Dinamo-MAI" which beat "Dinamo-Gloria" 3-0 (3:1, 3:2, 3:1) in the final series.

== Past champions ==
Years	Champions	Runners-up	Third placed
2004	ASEM Chișinău		
2005	ASEM Chișinău		
2006	USM Bostavan		
2007	Speranta Chișinău		
2008	ASEM Chișinău		
2009	ASEM Chișinău		
2010	UTM Chișinău		
2011	ASEM Chișinău		
2012	USM Bostavan		
2013	ASEM Chișinău		
2014	USM Bostavan		
2015	Speranta Chișinău		
2016	USM Bostavan		
2017	USM Bostavan		
2018	Dinamo MAI Chișinău	USM Bostavan	
2019	Dinamo MAI Chișinău	Dinamo Gloria Tiraspol	USM Bostavan
2020	Competition Cancelled		
2021	Dinamo MAI Chișinău		
2022	Dinamo MAI Chișinău	Dinamo Gloria Tiraspol	USM Bstavan
