= Belarusian Women's Volleyball League =

Belarusian 1st League
- Current season, competition or edition: 2020–21 Belarusian 1st Volleyball Women's League
- Sport: Volleyball
- Founded: 1991
- First season: 1992
- Administrator: BFV
- No. of teams: 8 (2020–21)
- Country: Belarus
- Continent: Europe
- Most recent champion: Minchanka Minsk(10th title)
- Most titles: Minchanka Minsk (10 titles)
- Level on pyramid: 1
- Relegation to: 2nd League
- Domestic cups: Belarusian Cup; Belarusian Super Cup
- International cups: CEV Champions League; CEV Cup; CEV Challenge Cup

The Belarusian Women's Volleyball 1st League or in (Belarusian Чэмпіянат Беларусі па валейболе сярод жанчын ) is the most important Belarusian women's volleyball competition organized by the Belarusian Volleyball Federation (Bielorusskaia Federatsija Volejbola, BFV), it was established in 1992 just after the dissolution of the Soviet Union.

== History ==
Until 2007, the competition were held as a single round-robin tournament; the champions were determined by the number of points earned. Beginning with the 2007 season, the structure of the championship was changed to two divisions: Division A, where the top teams plays for the title, and Division B, where the rest play for ranking only.

=== List of champions ===
Years	Champions	Runners up	Third place
1992	Kommunalnik Minsk	Ekran Gomel	Vesnianka Hrodna
1993	Kommunalnik Minsk	Gomelchanka Gomel	Mastra Minsk
1994	Amkodor Minsk	Enka Minsk	BBB-Université Gomel
1995	Amkodor Minsk	Gomeldrav Gomel	Enka Minsk
1996	Amkodor Minsk	SCAF-RSHVSM Minsk	Kovrovschik Brest
1997	Amkodor Minsk	Kovrovschik Brest	Nadezhda Gomel
1998	Amkodor Minsk	Nadezhda Gomel	Kovrovschik Brest
1999	Amkodor RSHVSM Minsk	Kovrovschik Brest	Atlant Baranovitchi
2000	Atlant Baranovitchi	Belbusinessbank Minsk	Gomeldrav Nadezhda Gomel
2001	Belbusinessbank Minsk	Atlant Baranovitchi	Kovrovschik Brest
2002	Kovrovschik Brest	Belbusinessbank Minsk	Ghani-RSHVSM Minsk
2003	Kovrovschik Brest	Belbusinessbank BSEU Minsk	Slavyanka RSHVSM Minsk
2004	Belbusinessbank BSEU Minsk	Slavyanka RSHVSM Minsk	Atlant Baranovitchi
2005	Dinamo Slavyanka Minsk	Belbusinessbank BSEU Minsk	Atlant Baranovitchi
2006	Atlant Baranovitchi	Belbusinessbank BSEU Minsk	Slavyanka-RTSOR Minsk
2007	Minchanka BSEU Minsk	Atlant Baranovitchi	Kommunalnik Mogilev
2008	Atlant Baranovitchi	Kommunalnik Mogilev	Minchanka BSEU Minsk
2009	Atlant Baranovitchi	Minchanka Minsk	Nioman Hrodna
2010	Minchanka Minsk	Kommunalnik Mogilev	Atlant Baranovitchi
2011	Atlant Baranovitchi	Minchanka Minsk	Kommunalnik Mogilev
2012	Atlant Baranovitchi	Kommunalnik Mogilev	Minchanka Minsk
2013	GRSU Nioman Hrodna	Atlant Baranovitchi	Minchanka Minsk
2014	Pribuzhje Brest	Minchanka Minsk	Atlant Baranovitchi
2015	Zhemchuzhina Polesja	Minchanka Minsk	Pribuzhje Brest
2016	Minchanka Minsk	Zhemchuzhina Polesja	Pribuzhje Lokomotiv Brest
2017	Minchanka Minsk	Zhemchuzhina Polesja	Kommunalnik GrGU
2018	Minchanka Minsk	Pribuzhje Brest	Zhemchuzhina Polesja
2019	Minchanka Minsk	Pribuzhje Brest	Zhemchuzhina Polesja
2020	Minchanka Minsk	Zhemchuzhina Polesja	Pribuzhje Brest
