= 2020 Sunshine Coast Gympie Rugby League season =

- Countries: Australia
- Number of teams: 8

Official website
- rlsc.com.au

The 2020 Sunshine Coast Gympie Rugby League season was to be the 101st season rugby league football in the area that is now the Sunshine Coast, Queensland.

The start to the season was disrupted by the COVID-19 pandemic, which was formally declared a pandemic on 11 March 2020.

On 16 June it was reported that a number of clubs – including six Division 1 clubs – didn't nominate sides for the 2020 season by the June 15h deadline. The season was eventually cancelled.

Out of our nine clubs with A Grade teams, six teams decided not to nominate teams this year.

— SCGRL statement
