= 2020 in sports =

2020 in sports describes the year's events in world sport. Many sporting events around the world were postponed or cancelled because of the COVID-19 pandemic, including the 2020 Summer Olympics and Paralympics, which eventually took place in 2021.

== Air sports ==
=== Aeromodelling ===
- March 26 – 29: 2020 FAI F1D World Championship for Indoor Model Aircraft in (Romania) Slanic Prahova
- July 27 – August 1: 2020 FAI F4 World Championships for Scale Model Aircraft in (Norway) Tønsberg
- August 3 – 8: 2020 FAI F3J World Championship for Model Gliders in (Slovakia) Tekovsky Hradok
- August 10 – 15: 2020 FAI F2 World Championships for Control Line Model Aircraft in (Poland) Włocławek
- August 21 – 29: 2020 FAI S World Championships for Space Models in (Romania) Buzău
- September 12 – 19: 2020 FAI F5B World Championship for Electric Model Aircraft in (Bulgaria) Dupnitsa
- October 5 – 10: 2020 FAI F3F World Championship for Model Gliders in (France) Limoux

=== Air Racing ===
- TBD: 2020 Air Race 1 World Cup (location TBA)
- TBD: 2020 Air Race E World Cup (locations TBA)

=== Ballooning ===
- August 11 – 15: 2020 FAI Women's World Hot Air Balloon Championship in (Poland) Nałęczów
- September 20 – 26: 2020 FAI World Hot Air Balloon Championship in (Slovenia) Murska Sobota

=== Drone racing ===
FAI World Drone Racing Championships

- TBD: FAI World Drone Racing Championships (location TBA)

FAI Drone Racing World Cup

- March 13: Race of Drones Oulu (WCC #1) in (Finland) Oulu
- May 16 & 17: Seoul Drone Race World Cup (WCC #2) in (South Korea) Seoul
- May 16 & 17: MajFlaj (WCC #3) in (North Macedonia) Skopje
- June 5 – 7: Drone World Cup El Yelmo (WCC #4) in (Spain) El Yelmo
- June 27 & 28: Drone Extreme Racing (WCC #5) in (Serbia) Bela Crkva
- July 4 & 5: Partouche Drone Race II (WCC #6) in (France) Forges-les-Eaux
- July 11 & 12: World Cup Cubillos Del Sil (WCC #7) in (Spain) Cubillos del Sil
- July 11 & 12: DRWC in (Belgium) (WCC #8) Lier
- July 17 & 19: Drone Race San Marino World Cup F9U (WCC #9) in Serravalle
- July 25 & 26: Mitteldeutscher FPV Race Cup (WCC #10) in (Germany) Bitterfeld
- July 25 & 26: Belarus Drone Racing World Cup (WCC #11) in Minsk
- August 29 & 30: F9U World Cup (WCC #12) in (United Kingdom) RAF Barkston Heath
- September 5 & 6: F9U World Cup Italy (WCC #13) in Magreta di Sassuolo
- September 5 & 6: PAM Cup (WCC #14) in (Bulgaria) Plovdiv
- September 19 & 20: Daegu Drone Race World Cup (WCC #15) in (South Korea) Daegu
- October 3 & 4: Danish Drone Nationals (WCC #16) in (Denmark) Central Jutland
- October 10 & 11: Argentina Open World Cup F9U (WCC #17) in Buenos Aires
- October 10: Dutch Drone Race World Cup (WCC #18) in (Netherlands) Assen
- October 10 & 11: Phoenix Drone Racing - Trophy of Prilep (WCC #19) in (North Macedonia) Prilep

=== General aviation ===
- November 15 – 20: 2020 FAI World Air Navigation Race Championship in (South Africa) Stellenbosch

=== Gliding ===
- January 3 – 18: 2020 FAI Women's World Gliding Championship in (Australia) Lake Keepit
  - 18 metre winner: (France) Mélanie Gadoulet
  - Standard winner: (United States) Sarah Arnold
  - Club winner: (Italy) Elena Fergnani
- July 19 – 31: 2020 FAI World Gliding Championships in (Germany) Stendal (Open, 18 meter, 20 meter Multi-seat)
- August 8 – 22: 2020 FAI World Gliding Championships in (France) Écury-sur-Coole (15 meter, Standard, Club)

=== Parachuting ===
- August 8 – 22: 2020 World Parachuting Championships in (Russia) Novosibirsk

== American football ==
- Super Bowl LIV – the Kansas City Chiefs (AFC) won 31–20 over the San Francisco 49ers (NFC)
  - Location: Hard Rock Stadium
  - Attendance: 62,417
  - MVP: Patrick Mahomes, QB (Kansas City)

== Aquatics ==
=== 2020 Summer Olympics (Aquatics) ===
- April 21 – 26: 2020 FINA Diving World Cup in (Japan) Tokyo
- April 30 – May 3: FINA Artistic Swimming Olympic Games Qualification Tournament 2020 in (Japan) Tokyo
- May 30 – 31: FINA Olympic Marathon Swim Qualifier 2020 in (Japan) Fukuoka

== Archery ==
=== International and continental competitions ===
- March 23 – 29: 2020 Pan American Archery Championships in (Mexico) Monterrey
- April 5 – 6: 2020 Oceanian Archery Championships in (Fiji) Suva
- May 20 – 26: 2020 European Archery Championships in (Turkey) Antalya

=== 2020 Archery World Cup ===
- May 11 – 17: AWC #1 in (Turkey) Antalya
- June 21 – 28: AWC #2 in (Germany) Berlin
- September 26 & 27: AWC #3 (final) in (China) Shanghai

== Association football ==
=== 2020 Summer Olympics (Association football) ===
- January 8 – 26: 2020 AFC U-23 Championship in Thailand
  - South Korea defeated Saudi Arabia, 1 – 0. Third place: Australia
- January 18 – February 9: 2020 CONMEBOL Pre-Olympic Tournament in Colombia
  - Argentina won the Final Stage. Brazil take Second Place. Third place: Uruguay
- January 28 – February 9: 2020 CONCACAF Women's Olympic Qualifying Championship in United States
  - United States defeated Canada, 3 – 0.
- March 20 – April 1: 2020 CONCACAF Men's Olympic Qualifying Championship in (Mexico) Guadalajara

=== FIFA ===
International

- August 10 – 30: 2020 FIFA U-20 Women's World Cup in Costa Rica (Moved to 2021 due to COVID-19 pandemic)
- November 2 – 21: 2020 FIFA U-17 Women's World Cup in India (Moved to 2021 due to COVID-19 pandemic)

Clubs

- TBD for December: 2020 FIFA Club World Cup in (Qatar) Doha

=== UEFA ===
National teams

- September 3 – November 17: 2020-21 UEFA Nations League
- June 12 – July 12: UEFA Euro 2020 in 12 cities around (European Union) Europe

Clubs

- September 11, 2019 – August 30, 2020: 2019–20 UEFA Women's Champions League (final in (Spain) San Sebastián)
  - (France) Lyon defeated (Germany) VfL Wolfsburg, 3 – 1.
- September 17, 2019 – August 23, 2020: 2019–20 UEFA Champions League (final in (Portugal) Lisbon)
  - (Germany) Bayern Munich defeated (France) Paris Saint-Germain, 1 – 0.
- September 19, 2019 – August 21, 2020: 2019–20 UEFA Europa League (final in (Germany) Cologne)
  - (Spain) Sevilla defeated (Italy) Inter Milan, 3 – 2.
- September 24, 2020: 2020 UEFA Super Cup in (Hungary) Budapest
  - (Germany) Bayern Munich defeated (Spain) Sevilla, 2 – 1.

=== CONMEBOL ===
National teams

- June 12 – July 12: 2020 Copa América in Argentina and Colombia

Clubs

- January 21 – November 21: 2020 Copa Libertadores (final in (Brazil) Rio de Janeiro)
- February 4 – November 7: 2020 Copa Sudamericana (final in (Argentina) Córdoba)
- TBD for May: 2020 Recopa Sudamericana (location TBA)
- TBD: 2020 Copa Libertadores Femenina (location TBA)

=== AFC ===
Clubs

- February 10 – November 7: 2020 AFC Cup
- February 10 – December 19: 2020 AFC Champions League
  - (South Korea) Ulsan Hyundai defeated (Iran) Persepolis, 2 – 1.
- TBD: 2020 AFC Women's Club Championship

=== CAF ===
National teams

- April 4 – 25: 2020 African Nations Championship in Cameroon
- November 28 – December 12: 2020 Africa Women Cup of Nations (location TBA)

Clubs

- August 9, 2019 – October 25, 2020: 2019–20 CAF Confederation Cup
  - (Morocco) RS Berkane defeated (Egypt) Pyramids, 1 – 0.
- August 9, 2019 – May 30, 2020: 2019–20 CAF Champions League
  - (Egypt) Al Ahly defeated (Egypt) Zamalek, 2 – 1.
- TBD: 2020 CAF Super Cup

=== CONCACAF ===
National teams

- June: 2020 CONCACAF Nations League Final Round

Clubs

- February 18 – May 7: 2020 CONCACAF Champions League
  - (Mexico) UANL defeated (United States) Los Angeles FC, 2 – 1.
- July – November: 2020 CONCACAF League

=== OFC ===
National teams

- June 6 – 20: 2020 OFC Nations Cup (location TBA)

Clubs

- February 15 – May 16: 2020 OFC Champions League

== Athletics ==
=== International and continental events ===
- June 24 – 28: 2020 African Championships in Athletics in (Algeria) Algiers
- August 26 – 30: 2020 European Athletics Championships in (France) Paris
- August 28 – 30: 2020 NACAC Championships (location TBA)

=== World Marathon Majors ===
- March 1: 2020 Tokyo Marathon in (Japan) Tokyo
- September 14: 2020 Boston Marathon in (United States) Boston
- September 27: 2020 Berlin Marathon in (Germany) Berlin
- October 4: 2020 London Marathon in (United Kingdom) London
- October 11: 2020 Chicago Marathon in (United States) Chicago
- November 1: 2020 New York City Marathon in (United States) New York City

=== 2020 Diamond League ===
- April 17: DL #1 in (Qatar) Doha
- May 9: DL #2 in (China) Taohua Island
- May 16: DL #3 in (China) Shanghai
- May 24: DL #4 in (Sweden) Stockholm
- May 28: DL #5 in (Italy) Rome
- May 31: DL #6 in (Morocco) Rabat
- June 7: DL #7 in (United States) Eugene
- June 11: DL #8 in (Norway) Oslo
- June 13: DL #9 in (France) Paris
- July 4 & 5: DL #10 in (United Kingdom) London
- July 10: DL #11 in Monaco
- August 16: DL #12 in (United Kingdom) Gateshead
- August 20: DL #13 in (Switzerland) Lausanne
- September 4: DL #14 in (Belgium) Brussels
- September 11: DL #15 (final) in (Switzerland) Zürich

=== 2020 Race walking Challenge ===
- March 28: RWC #1 in (China) Taicang
- April 4: RWC #2 in (Portugal) Rio Maior
- May 2 & 3: RWC #3 in (Belarus) Minsk
- May 30: RWC #4 in (Spain) La Coruña
- October 18 & 20: RWC #5 (final) in (China) Suzhou

== Aussie rules ==
- February 7 – March 29: 2020 AFL Women's season
- March 19 – August: 2020 AFL season
- April 18: 2020 AFL Women's Grand Final (location TBA)
- September 26: 2020 AFL Grand Final in (Victoria (state)) Melbourne
- November: 2020 International Rules Series in Ireland

== Badminton ==
=== 2020 International badminton events (Grade 1) ===
- May 16 – 24: 2020 Thomas & Uber Cup in (Denmark) Aarhus
- December 9 – 13: 2020 BWF World Tour Finals in (China) Guangzhou

=== 2020 Continental badminton events ===
- February 10 – 15: 2020 Oceania Badminton Championships (Senior, Junior, & Teams) in (Australia) Ballart
  - Men's Singles: (New Zealand) Abhinav Manota
  - Women's Singles: (Australia) Chen Hsuan-yu
  - Men's Doubles: (New Zealand) Oliver Leydon-Davis / Abhinav Manota
  - Women's Doubles: (Australia) Setyana Mapasa / Gronya Somerville
  - Mixed Doubles: (Australia) Simon Leung / Gronya Somerville
- February 10 – 16: 2020 African Badminton Championships (Senior, Junior, & Teams) in (Egypt) Cairo
  - Men's Singles: (Mauritius) Georges Paul
  - Women's Singles: (Mauritius) Kate Foo Kune
  - Men's Doubles: (Algeria) Koceila Mammeri / Youcef Sabri Medel
  - Women's Doubles: (Egypt) Doha Hany / Hadia Hosny
  - Mixed Doubles: (Egypt) Adham Hatem Elgamal / Doha Hany
- February 11 – 16: 2020 European Men's and Women's Team Badminton Championships in (France) Liévin
  - Men's Team: Denmark national badminton team
  - Women's Team: Denmark national badminton team
- February 11 – 16: 2020 Badminton Asia Team Championships in (Philippines) Manila
  - Men's Team: Indonesia national badminton team
  - Women's Team: Japan national badminton team
- February 13 – 16: 2020 Pan Am Badminton Championships (Team) in (Brazil) Salvador
  - Men's Team: Canada national badminton team
  - Women's Team: Canada national badminton team
- April 21 – 26: 2020 European Badminton Championships (Individual) in Denmark (location TBA)
- April 21 – 26: 2020 Badminton Asia Championships in (China) Wuhan
- April 23 – 26: 2020 Pan Am Badminton Championships in Guatemala City

=== 2020 BWF season (Grade 2) ===
- January 7 – November 29: 2020 BWF World Tour

==== Level Two (Super 1000) ====
- March 11 – 15: 2020 All England Open in Birmingham
- June 16 – 21: 2020 Indonesia Open in Jakarta
- September 15 – 20: 2020 China Open in Changzhou

== Bandy ==
- March 29 – April 5: 2020 Bandy World Championship in (Russia) Irkutsk
- February 19 – 22: 2020 Women's Bandy World Championship in (Norway) Oslo
  - Sweden women's national bandy team
- TBD for October: 2020 Bandy World Cup (location TBA)

== Baseball ==
=== 2020 Summer Olympics (Baseball) ===
- March 22 – 26: Americas Qualifying Event in (United States) Arizona
- April 1 – 5: Final Qualifying Tournament in Taiwan

=== International and continental events ===
- TBD for March: 2020 South American Baseball Championship in (Chile) Tocopilla
- TBD: 2020 Women's Baseball World Cup (location TBA)

=== Major League Baseball ===
- July 23 – September 27: 2020 Major League Baseball season
  - American League regular season winners: (Florida) Tampa Bay Rays
  - National League regular season winners: (California) Los Angeles Dodgers
- June 10 – 12: 2020 College World Series in (Nebraska) Omaha
  - College World Series cancelled March 13, 2020 due to COVID-19 pandemic.
- July 14: 2020 Major League Baseball All-Star Game in (California) Los Angeles
  - All-Star Game cancelled.
- October 20 – 27: 2020 World Series
  - The (California) Los Angeles Dodgers defeated the (Florida) Tampa Bay Rays, 4–2 in games played, to win their seventh World Series title.

=== Caribbean Series ===
- February 1 – 7: 2020 Caribbean Series in (Puerto Rico) San Juan
  - (Dominican Republic) Toros del Este defeated (Venezuela) Cardenales de Lara, 9 – 3. Third place: (Mexico) Tomateros de Culiacán

=== CEB ===
- June: 2020 European Champions Cup in (Czech Republic) Ostrava

== Basketball ==
=== 2020 Summer Olympics (Basketball) ===
- February 6 – 9: 2020 FIBA Women's Olympic Qualifying Tournaments #1 in Ostend
  - Canada and Belgium qualified for the 2020 Summer Olympics
- February 6 – 9: 2020 FIBA Women's Olympic Qualifying Tournaments #2 and #4 in Belgrade
  - Serbia, Nigeria, China, Spain, and South Korea qualified for the 2020 Summer Olympics
- February 6 – 9: 2020 FIBA Women's Olympic Qualifying Tournaments #3 in Bourges
  - France, Australia, and Puerto Rico qualified for the 2020 Summer Olympics

=== FIBA ===
- February 7 – 9: 2020 FIBA Intercontinental Cup in (Spain) San Cristóbal de La Laguna
  - (Spain) Iberostar Tenerife defeated (Italy) Virtus Pallacanestro Bologna, 80 – 72. Third place (Argentina) San Lorenzo de Almagro

=== FIBA Europe ===
- September 17, 2019 – May 2: 2019–20 Basketball Champions League
- September 26, 2019 – April 15: 2019–20 EuroCup Women
- September 25, 2019 – April 19: 2019–20 EuroLeague Women
- October 1, 2019 – April 29: 2019–20 EuroCup Basketball
- October 2, 2019 – April 29: 2019–20 FIBA Europe Cup
- October: 2020 FIBA Europe SuperCup Women

=== FIBA Africa ===
- March – May 2020: 2020 BAL season
- TBD: 2020 FIBA Africa Women's Clubs Champions Cup (location TBA)

=== FIBA Asia ===
- TBD: 2020 FIBA Asia Champions Cup (location TBA)

=== FIBA Americas ===
- October 28, 2019 – March 14, 2020: 2019-20 BCLA season
- TBD: 2020 South American Women's Club Championship

=== National Basketball Association ===
- October 22, 2019 – April 15, 2020: 2019–20 NBA season, suspended on March 11, 2020; pausing the season temporarily
- January 26: Kobe Bryant dies in a helicopter crash in Calabasas, California.
- February 16: 2020 NBA All-Star Game in (Illinois) Chicago
  - All-Star Game: Team LeBron defeated Team Giannis, 157 – 155.
  - Celebrity Game: Team Wilbon defeated Team Stephen, 62 – 47.
  - Rising Stars Challenge: Team USA defeated Team World, 151 – 131.
  - Skills Challenge: Bam Adebayo (Miami) defeated Domantas Sabonis (Indiana)
  - Three Point Contest: Buddy Hield (Sacramento Kings)
  - Slam Dunk Contest: Derrick Jones Jr. (Miami)
- August 17, 2020 – October 11, 2020: 2020 NBA playoffs
  - The (California) Los Angeles Lakers defeated the (Florida) Miami Heat, 4–2, to win their seventeenth NBA title.
- June 25: 2020 NBA draft in (New York (state)) Brooklyn

=== WNBA ===
- April 17: 2020 WNBA draft, held virtually due to the COVID-19 pandemic in the United States
  - #1 pick: (California) Sabrina Ionescu from the Oregon Ducks to the (New York (state)) New York Liberty.
- July – October: 2020 WNBA season
- September 15 - October 6: 2020 WNBA Playoffs

=== FIBA 3X3 ===
- June 26 – 28: 2020 FIBA 3x3 Europe Cup in (Belgium) Antwerp
- TBD: 2020 FIBA 3x3 Asia Cup in (China) Changsha
- TBD: 2020 FIBA 3x3 Africa Cup (location TBA)

==== FIBA 3x3 World Tour ====
- April 10 & 11: 3x3 WT #1 in (Qatar) Doha
- May 30 & 31: 3x3 WT #2 in (China) Chengdu
- August 1 & 2: 3x3 WT #3 in (Czech Republic) Prague
- August 21 & 22: 3x3 WT #4 in (Switzerland) Lausanne
- August 29 & 30: 3x3 WT #5 in (Hungary) Debrecen
- November 14 – 20: 3x3 WT #6 (Final) in (United States) Los Angeles

== Beach volleyball ==
=== 2020 Summer Olympics (Beach volleyball) ===
- June 22 – 28: 2018–2020 AVC Beach Volleyball Continental Cup Final
- June 22 – 28: 2018–2020 CAVB Beach Volleyball Continental Cup Final
- June 22 – 28: 2018–2020 CEV Beach Volleyball Continental Cup Final in (Netherlands) Eindhoven
- June 22 – 28: 2018–2020 CSV Beach Volleyball Continental Cup
- June 22 – 28: 2018–2020 NORCECA Beach Volleyball Continental Cup

=== International and continental events ===
- 15–20 September: 2020 European Beach Volleyball Championship
- TBD: 2020 Asian Beach Volleyball Championship
- TBD: 2020 CAVB Beach Volleyball Nations Cup
- TBD: 2020 NORCECA Circuit
- TBD: 2020 CSVP Circuit

=== 2020 FIVB Beach Volleyball World Tour ===
- TBD: FIVB World Tour Finals (location TBA)

==== 2020 World Tour Five Star BV events ====
- June 10 – 14: Five Star #1 in (Italy) Rome
- July 7 – 12: Five Star #2 in (Switzerland) Gstaad
- August 12 – 16: Five Star #3 in (Austria) Vienna
- August 19 – 23: Five Star #4 in (Germany) Hamburg

== Boules ==
=== Boule Lyonnaise ===
- September 23 – 26: 2020 Women's Boule Lyonnaise World Championships in (Italy) Alassio

=== Pétanque ===
- July 16 – 19: 2020 Petanque World Championships in (Switzerland) Lausanne

== Canoeing ==
=== 2020 Summer Olympics (Canoeing) ===
- March 26 – 29: 2020 Canoe Sprint Asian Olympic Qualifier in (Thailand) Pattaya
- May 6 & 7: 2020 Canoe Sprint European Olympic Qualifier in (Czech Republic) Račice
- May 21 – 24: 2020 ICF Canoe Sprint Final Olympic Qualifier in (Germany) Duisburg

=== 2020 Summer Paralympics (Paracanoeing) ===
- May 21 – 24: 2020 ICF Paracanoe World Championships & Paralympic Qualifier in (Germany) Duisburg

== Cheerleading ==
- April 27 – 29: 2020 ICU World Cheerleading Championships (location TBA)

== Chess ==
=== International events ===
- March 15 – April 5: Candidates Tournament 2020 in (Russia) Yekaterinburg
- August 5 – 18: 44th Chess Olympiad in (Russia) Khanty-Mansiysk
- January 4 – 24: Women's World Chess Championship 2020 in (China) Shanghai and (Russia) Vladivostok
  - (China) Ju Wenjun defeated (Russia) Aleksandra Goryachkina, 6 (2½) – 6 (1½).

=== FIDE Women's Grand Prix 2019–20 ===
- September 10 – 23, 2019: WGP #1 in (Russia) Skolkovo winner: (India) Humpy Koneru
- December 2 – 15, 2019: WGP #2 in Monaco winners: (Russia) Alexandra Kosteniuk, (India) Humpy Koneru, (Russia) Aleksandra Goryachkina (tie)
- March 1 – 14: WGP #3 in (Switzerland) Lausanne winners: (Georgia (country)) Nana Dzagnidze & (Russia) Aleksandra Goryachkina (tie)
- May 2 – 15: WGP #4 (final) in Italy

== Cricket ==
=== World Cups ===
- February 21 – March 8: 2020 ICC Women's T20 World Cup in Australia
  - Australia defeated India 184/4 (20 overs) – 99 (19.1 overs)
- 2020 ICC Men's T20 World Cup in Australia : Postponed.

== Curling ==
=== 2019–20 International curling championships ===
- October 12 – 19, 2019: 2019 World Mixed Curling Championship in (Scotland) Aberdeen
  - Canada (Skip: Colin Kurz) defeated Germany (Skip: Andy Kapp), 6–5, to win Canada's second consecutive World Mixed Curling Championship title.
  - Norway (Skip: Ingvild Skaga) took third place.
- November 2 – 9, 2019: 2019 Pacific-Asia Curling Championships in Shenzhen
  - Men: South Korea (Skip: Kim Chang-min) defeated Japan (Skip: Yuta Matsumura), 11–2, to win South Korea's fourth Men's Pacific-Asia Curling Championships title.
    - China (Skip: Zou Qiang) took third place.
  - Women: China (Skip: Han Yu) defeated Japan (Skip: Seina Nakajima), 10–3, to win China's eighth Women's Pacific-Asia Curling Championships title.
    - South Korea (Skip: Gim Un-chi) took third place.
- November 16 – 23, 2019: 2019 European Curling Championships in Helsingborg
  - Men: Sweden (Skip: Niklas Edin) defeated Switzerland (Skip: Yannick Schwaller), 9–3, to win Sweden's 11th Men's European Curling Championships title.
  - Women: Sweden (Skip: Anna Hasselborg) defeated Scotland (Skip: Eve Muirhead), 5–4, to win Sweden's 21st Women's European Curling Championships title.
    - Switzerland (Skip: Silvana Tirinzoni) took third place.
- November 28 – 30, 2019: 2019 Americas Challenge in Eveleth
  - Men: Champion: United States (Skip: Rich Ruohonen); Second: Mexico (Skip: Ramy Cohen Masri); Third: Brazil (Skip: Michael Krahenbuhl)
  - Women: Champion: United States (Skip: Tabitha Peterson); Second: Mexico (Skip: Adriana Camarena Osorno); Third: Brazil (Skip: Anne Shibuya)
- December 2 – 7, 2019: 2019 World Mixed Doubles Qualification Event in (Scotland) Howwood
  - China, Germany, Italy, South Korea all qualified for the 2020 World Mixed Doubles Curling Championship.
- January 13 – 18: 2020 World Qualification Event in (Finland) Lohja
  - Men: China and Russia has been qualified to 2020 World Men's Curling Championship
  - Women: South Korea and Italy has been qualified to 2020 World Women's Curling Championship
- February 29 – March 7: 2020 World Wheelchair Curling Championship in (Switzerland) Wetzikon
  - Champion: Russia (Skip: Konstantin Kurokhtin); Second: Canada (Skip: Mark Ideson); Third: Sweden (Skip: Viljo Petersson-Dahl)
- March 14 – 22: 2020 World Women's Curling Championship in (Canada) Prince George
- March 28 – April 5: 2020 World Men's Curling Championship in (Scotland) Glasgow
- April 18 – 25: 2020 World Mixed Doubles Curling Championship in (Canada) Kelowna

=== 2019–20 World Curling Tour & Grand Slam of Curling ===
- June 15, 2019 – May 3, 2020: 2019–20 World Curling Tour and Grand Slam of Curling Seasons
  - October 22 – 27, 2019: 2019 Masters in (Ontario) North Bay
    - Men: Team Matt Dunstone defeated Team (Newfoundland and Labrador) Brad Gushue, 8–5, to win Saskatchewan's second Men's Masters title.
    - Women: Team Tracy Fleury defeated Team (Japan) Sayaka Yoshimura, 7–5, to win Manitoba's second Women's Masters title.
  - November 5 – 10, 2019: 2019 Tour Challenge in (Nova Scotia) Pictou County
    - Men: Team Brad Jacobs defeated Team (Newfoundland and Labrador) Brad Gushue, 6–4, to win Ontario's second consecutive Men's Tour Challenge title.
    - Women: Team Anna Hasselborg defeated Team (Manitoba) Kerri Einarson, 8–5, to win Sweden's first Women's Tour Challenge title.
  - December 10 – 15, 2019: 2019 National in (Newfoundland and Labrador) Conception Bay South
    - Men: Team (Ontario) Brad Jacobs defeated Team (Sweden) Niklas Edin, 3–1.
    - Women: Team (Sweden) Anna Hasselborg defeated Team (Manitoba) Jennifer Jones, 7–3.
  - January 14 – 19: 2020 Canadian Open in (Saskatchewan) Yorkton
    - Men: Team (Ontario) Brad Jacobs defeated Team (Ontario) John Epping, 6–5.
    - Women: Team (Sweden) Anna Hasselborg defeated Team (South Korea) Kim Min-ji, 7–5.
  - April 7 – 12: 2020 Players' Championship in (Ontario) Toronto
  - April 29 – May 3: 2020 Champions Cup in (Alberta) Olds

== Cycle ball ==
World cup

- February 29: UCI Artistic Cycling World Cup #1 in (Austria) Koblach
  - Mixed Artistic Cycling ACT4 Winner: Germany
  - Women Pair Artistic Cycling Women Winner: Germany
  - Mixed Pair Artistic Cycling Mix Winner: Germany
  - Men Single Artistic Cycling Men Winner: (Germany) Lukas Kohl
  - Women Single Artistic Cycling Women Winner: (Germany) Maren Hasse
- April 4: UCI Cycle-ball World Cup #1 in (Switzerland) Winterthur
- April 25: UCI Cycle-ball World Cup #2 in (Germany) Wendlingen
- June 20: UCI Cycle-ball World Cup #3 in (Czech Republic) Svitávka
- June 27: UCI Artistic Cycling World Cup #2 in (Slovakia) Komárno
- September 5: UCI Cycle-ball World Cup #4 in (Austria) Dornbirn
- September 19: UCI Cycle-ball World Cup #5 in (Germany) Hardt
- October 10: UCI Cycle-ball World Cup #6 in (Switzerland) St. Gallen
- October 31: UCI Cycle-ball World Cup #7 in (Germany) Sangerhausen
- November 21: UCI Artistic Cycling World Cup (final) in (Germany) Erlenbach
- December 5: UCI Cycle-ball World Cup (final) in (Czech Republic) Prague

International competitions

- July 4 & 5: Champions Cup in (Japan) Osaka
- August 1: 15th Asian Indoor Cycling Championships in Hong Kong
- November 21: 2020 U23 Cycle-ball European Championship in (Switzerland) Mosnang
- November 27 – 29: UCI Indoor Cycling World Championships - Cycle-ball in (Germany) Stuttgart
- November 27 – 29: UCI Indoor Cycling World Championships - Artistic Cycling in (Germany) Stuttgart

== Cycling — BMX ==
=== International BMX events ===
- May 26 – 31: 2020 UCI BMX World Championships in (United States) Houston

=== 2020 UCI BMX Supercross World Cup ===
- February 1 & 2: SCWC #1 & #2 in (Australia) Shepparton
  - Men Elite Winner: (Netherlands) Niek Kimmann (#1) & (United States) Connor Fields (#2)
  - Women Elite Winner: (United States) Alise Willoughby (#1 & #2)
- February 8 & 9: SCWC #3 & #4 in (Australia) Bathurst
  - Men Elite Winner: (United States) Connor Fields (#3 & #4)
- April 18 & 19: SCWC #5 & #6 in (United Kingdom) Manchester
- May 2 & 3: SCWC #7 & #8 in (Netherlands) Papendal
- May 16 & 17: SCWC #9 & #10 (final) in (United States) Rock Hill

== Cycling – Cyclo-cross ==
=== 2019–20 International Cyclo-cross events ===
- November 9 & 10, 2019: 2019 Pan American Cyclo-cross Championships in (Canada) Midland
  - Elite winners: (United States) Kerry Werner (m) / (Canada) Maghalie Rochette (f)
  - Juniors winners: (United States) Andrew Strohmeyer (m) / (United States) Madigan Munro (f)
  - U23 winners: (United States) Gage Hecht (m) / (Canada) Ruby West (f)
- November 9 & 10, 2019: 2019 UEC Cyclo-cross European Championships in (Italy) Silvelle
  - Elite winners: (Netherlands) Mathieu van der Poel (m) / (Netherlands) Yara Kastelijn (f)
  - Juniors winners: (Belgium) Thibau Nys (m) / (Netherlands) Puck Pieterse (f)
  - U23 winners: (France) Mickael Crispin (m) / (Netherlands) Ceylin del Carmen Alvarado (f)
- November 29 & 30, 2019: 2019 UCI Masters Cyclo-cross World Championships in (Belgium) Mol
  - 35–39 years winners: (Netherlands) Eddy van IJzendoorn (m) / (France) Viviane Rognant (f)
  - 40–44 years winners: (France) Thibaut Vassal (m) / (United Kingdom) Kate Eedy (f)
  - 45–49 years winners: (Belgium) Arne Daelmans (m) / (Belgium) Cindy Bauwens (f)
  - 50–54 years winners: (Netherlands) Erik Dekker (m) / (Netherlands) Marianne Van Leeuwen (f)
  - 55–59 years winners: (Belgium) Dirk Mertens (m) / (Luxembourg) Suzie Godart (f)
  - 60–64 years winners: (Belgium) Marc Verloo (m) / (United Kingdom) Nicola Davies (f)
  - 65–69 years winners: (United Kingdom) Dave McMullen (m) / (Canada) Patricia Konantz (f)
  - Men's 70–74 years winner: (France) Jean Bernard Galissaire
  - 70+ years winners: (United Kingdom) Victor Barnett (m) / (United States) Julie Lockhart (f)
- February 1 & 2: 2020 UCI Cyclo-cross World Championships in (Switzerland) Dübendorf
  - Men's elite race: (Netherlands) Mathieu van der Poel
  - Men's under-23 race: (Netherlands) Ryan Kamp
  - Men's junior race: (Belgium) Thibau Nys
  - Women's elite race: (Netherlands) Ceylin del Carmen Alvarado
  - Women's under-23 race: (France) Marion Norbert-Riberolle
  - Women's junior race: (Netherlands) Shirin van Anrooij

=== 2019–20 UCI Cyclo-cross World Cup ===
- September 14, 2019: CCWC #1 in (United States) Iowa City
  - Elite winners: (Belgium) Eli Iserbyt (m) / (Canada) Maghalie Rochette (f)
- September 22, 2019: CCWC #2 in (United States) Waterloo
  - Elite winners: (Belgium) Eli Iserbyt (m) / (Czech Republic) Kateřina Nash (f)
- October 20, 2019: CCWC #3 in (Switzerland) Bern
  - Elite winners: (Belgium) Eli Iserbyt (m) / (Netherlands) Annemarie Worst (f)
  - Men's Junior winner: (Belgium) Thibau Nys
  - Men's U23 winner: (Switzerland) Kevin Kuhn
- November 16, 2019: CCWC #4 in (Czech Republic) Tábor
  - Elite winners: (Netherlands) Mathieu van der Poel (m) / (Netherlands) Annemarie Worst (f)
  - Men's Junior winner: (Belgium) Thibau Nys
  - Men's U23 winner: (United Kingdom) Thomas Mein
- November 24, 2019: CCWC #5 in (Belgium) Koksijde
  - Elite winners: (Netherlands) Mathieu van der Poel (m) / (Netherlands) Ceylin del Carmen Alvarado (f)
  - Men's Junior winner: (Belgium) Thibau Nys
  - Men's U23 winner: (Belgium) Niels Vandeputte
- December 22, 2019: CCWC #6 in (Belgium) Namur
  - Elite winners: (Netherlands) Mathieu van der Poel (m) / (Netherlands) Lucinda Brand (f)
  - Men's Junior winner: (Belgium) Thibau Nys
  - Men's U23 winner: (Switzerland) Kevin Kuhn
- December 26, 2019: CCWC #7 in (Belgium) Heusden-Zolder
  - Elite winners: (Netherlands) Mathieu van der Poel (m) / (Netherlands) Lucinda Brand (f)
  - Men's Junior winner: (Belgium) Thibau Nys
  - Men's U23 winner: (Switzerland) Kevin Kuhn
- January 19: CCWC #8 in (France) Nommay
  - Men's elite race: (Belgium) Eli Iserbyt
  - Men's under-23 race: (Netherlands) Ryan Kamp
  - Women's elite race: (Netherlands) Annemarie Worst
  - Women's under-23 race: (Belgium) Thibau Nys
- January 26: CCWC #9 (final) in (Netherlands) Hoogerheide
  - Men's elite race: (Netherlands) Mathieu van der Poel
  - Men's under-23 race: (Netherlands) Ryan Kamp
  - Women's elite race: (Netherlands) Lucinda Brand
  - Women's under-23 race: (Switzerland) Dario Lillo

=== 2019–20 Cyclo-cross Superprestige ===
- October 13, 2019: CCS #1 in (Netherlands) Gieten
  - Elite winners: (Belgium) Eli Iserbyt (m) / (Netherlands) Ceylin del Carmen Alvarado (f)
  - Men's Junior winner: (Belgium) Thibau Nys
- October 19, 2019: CCS #2 in (Belgium) Boom
  - Elite winners: (Belgium) Toon Aerts (m) / (Italy) Alice Maria Arzuffi (f)
  - Men's Junior winner: (Belgium) Yorben Lauryssen
- October 27, 2019: CCS #3 in (Belgium) Gavere
  - Elite winners: (Belgium) Eli Iserbyt (m) / (Netherlands) Yara Kastelijn (f)
  - Men's Junior winner: (Belgium) Thibau Nys
- November 3, 2019: CCS #4 in (Belgium) Oostkamp-Ruddervoorde
  - Elite winners: (Netherlands) Mathieu van der Poel (m) / (Netherlands) Ceylin del Carmen Alvarado (f)
  - Men's Junior winner: (Belgium) Jente Michels
- December 8, 2019: CCS #5 in (Belgium) Zonhoven
  - Elite winners: (Belgium) Toon Aerts (m) / (Netherlands) Annemarie Worst (f)
  - Men's Junior winner: (Belgium) Thibau Nys
- December 29, 2019: CCS #6 in (Belgium) Diegem
  - Elite winners: (Netherlands) Mathieu van der Poel (m) / (Netherlands) Annemarie Worst (f)
  - Men's Junior winner: (Belgium) Thibau Nys
- February 9: CCS #7 in (Belgium) Merksplas
  - Cancelled
- February 15: CCS #8 (final) in (Belgium) Middelkerke
  - Elite winners: (Belgium) Laurens Sweeck (m) / Ceylin del Carmen Alvarado (f)

=== 2019–20 DVV Trophy ===
- November 1, 2019: DVV #1 in (Belgium) Melden-Oudenaarde
  - Elite winners: (Belgium) Eli Iserbyt (m) / (Netherlands) Yara Kastelijn (f)
  - Men's Junior winner: (Belgium) Arne Baers
  - Men's U23 winner: (Netherlands) Jens Dekker
- November 17, 2019: DVV #2 in (Belgium) Hamme
  - Elite winners: (Netherlands) Mathieu van der Poel (m) / (Netherlands) Annemarie Worst (f)
  - Men's Junior winner: (Belgium) Victor van de Putte
  - Men's U23 winner: (Belgium) Niels Vandeputte
- November 30, 2019: DVV #3 in (Belgium) Kortrijk
  - Elite winners: (Netherlands) Mathieu van der Poel (m) / (Netherlands) Lucinda Brand (f)
  - Men's Junior winner: (Belgium) Thibau Nys
  - Men's U23 winner: (Belgium) Niels Vandeputte
- December 14, 2019: DVV #4 in (Belgium) Ronse-Kluisbergen
  - Elite winners: (Belgium) Toon Aerts (m) / (Netherlands) Ceylin del Carmen Alvarado (f)
  - Men's U23 winner: (Netherlands) Ryan Kamp
  - Men's Junior winner: (Netherlands) Yorben Lauryssen
- December 27, 2019: DVV #5 in (Belgium) Loenhout
  - Elite winners: (Netherlands) Mathieu van der Poel (m) / (Netherlands) Ceylin del Carmen Alvarado (f)
  - Men's U23 winner: (Switzerland) Loris Rouiller
  - Men's Junior winner: (Netherlands) Tibor Del Grosso
- January 1: DVV #6 in (Belgium) Baal
  - Elite winners: (Netherlands) Mathieu van der Poel (m) / (Netherlands) Ceylin del Carmen Alvarado (f)
  - Men's U23 winner: (France) Antoine Benoist
  - Junior winners: (Belgium) Thibau Nys (m) / (United States) Madigan Munro (f)
- January 5: DVV #7 in (Belgium) Brussels
  - Elite winners: (Netherlands) Mathieu van der Poel (m) / (Netherlands) Ceylin del Carmen Alvarado (f)
  - Men's U23 winner: (Netherlands) Ryan Kamp
  - Junior winners: (Belgium) Lennert Belmans (m) / (Netherlands) Fem Van Empel (f)
- February 8: DVV #8 (final) in (Belgium) Lille
  - Elite winners: (Belgium) Wout Van Aert (m) / (Netherlands) Ceylin del Carmen Alvarado (f)
  - Men's U23 winner: (Belgium) Niels Vandeputte
  - Men's Junior winners: (Belgium) Thibau Nys

== Cycling – Mountain Bike ==
=== International mountain biking events ===
- May 14 – 17: 2020 European Continental Championships (XCE, XCO, & XCR) in (Austria) Graz
- June 25 – 28: 2020 UCI Mountain Bike World Championships (XCO & XCR) in (Germany) Albstadt
- September 5 & 6: 2020 UCI Mountain Bike World Championships (DHI only) in (Austria) Leogang
- September 10 & 11: 2020 UCI Mountain Bike World Championships (4X only) in (Italy) Val di Sole
- September 26 & 27: 2020 UCI Mountain Bike Marathon World Championships in (Turkey) Sakarya Province

=== 2020 UCI Mountain Bike World Cup ===
- March 21 & 22: MBWC #1 (DHI only) in (Portugal) Lousã
- May 2 & 3: MBWC #2 (DHI only) in (Slovenia) Maribor
- May 9 & 10: MBWC #3 (DHI only) in (Croatia) Lošinj
- May 22 – 24: MBWC #4 (XCO & XCC) in (Czech Republic) Nové Město na Moravě
- June 6 & 7: MBWC #5 (DHI only) in (United Kingdom) Fort William
- June 19 – 21: MBWC #6 (XCO, XCC, & DHI) in (Andorra) Vallnord-Pal Arinsal
- August 14 – 16: MBWC #7 (XCO & XCC) in (Switzerland) Lenzerheide
- August 21 – 23: MBWC #8 (XCO, XCC, & DHI) in (Canada) Mont-Sainte-Anne
- September 11 – 13: MBWC #9 (XCO, XCC, & DHI) in (Italy) Val di Sole
- September 18 – 20: MBWC #10 (XCO, XCC, & DHI) in (France) Les Gets

== Cycling – Road ==
=== 2020 Grand Tour events ===
- August 29 – September 20: 2020 Tour de France
- October 3 – 25: 2020 Giro d'Italia
- October 20 – November 8: 2020 Vuelta a España

=== 2020 UCI World Tour ===
- January 21 – 26: (Australia) Tour Down Under
  - Richie Porte (AUS)
- February 2: (Australia) Great Ocean Road Race
  - Dries Devenyns (BEL)
- February 23 – 29: (United Arab Emirates) UAE Tour
  - Adam Yates (GBR)
- February 29: (Belgium) Omloop Het Nieuwsblad
  - Jasper Stuyven (BEL)
- March 8 – 14: (France) Paris–Nice
  - Maximilian Schachmann (GER)

=== 2020 UCI Women's World Tour ===
- March 7: (Italy) 2020 Strade Bianche Women
  - Postponed to the COVID-19 pandemic
- March 15: (Netherlands) 2020 Ronde van Drenthe
- March 22: (Italy) 2020 Trofeo Alfredo Binda-Comune di Cittiglio
- March 26: (Belgium) 2020 Three Days of Bruges–De Panne
- March 29: (Belgium) 2020 Gent–Wevelgem

== Cycling – Track ==
=== International track cycling events ===
- October 17 – 21, 2019: 2020 Asian Track Cycling Championships in South Korea
  - Sprint winners: (Malaysia) Azizulhasni Awang (m) / (Hong Kong) Lee Wai Sze (f)
  - Keirin winners: (Japan) Yuta Wakimoto (m) / (Hong Kong) Lee Wai Sze (f)
  - Individual pursuit winners: (South Korea) Park Sang-hoon (m) / (South Korea) Lee Ju-mi (f)
  - Points race winners: (South Korea) Kim Eu-ro (m) / (Uzbekistan) Olga Zabelinskaya (f)
  - Scratch winners: (Hong Kong) Mow Ching Yin (m) / (Japan) Kie Furuyama (f)
  - Omnium winners: (Japan) Eiya Hashimoto (m) / (Japan) Yumi Kajihara (f)
  - Madison winners: (South Korea) Shin Dong-in & Kim Eu-ro (m) / (Hong Kong) Yang Qianyu & Pang Yao (f)
  - Men's 1 km time trial winner: (Kazakhstan) Andrey Chugay
  - Women's 500 m time trial winner: (China) Chen Feifei
  - Team sprint winners: Japan (m) / China (f)
  - Team pursuit winners: Japan (m) / South Korea (f)
- January 16 – 19: CAC Track African Championships in Cairo
  - Sprint winners: (South Africa) Jean Spies (m) / (South Africa) Charlene Du Preez (f)
  - Keirin winners: (South Africa) Jean Spies (m) / (South Africa) Charlene Du Preez (f)
  - Individual pursuit winners: (Algeria) Lotfi Tchambaz (m) / (Egypt) Ebtissam Zayed Ahmed (f)
  - Points race winners: (South Africa) David Maree (m) / (Egypt) Ebtissam Zayed Ahmed (f)
  - Scratch winners: (South Africa) Joshua Van Wyk (m) / (Egypt) Ebtissam Zayed Ahmed (f)
  - Omnium winners: (South Africa) David Maree (m) / (Egypt) Ebtissam Zayed Ahmed (f)
  - Madison winners: (South Africa) Joshua Van Wyk & Steven Van Heerden (m) / (South Africa) Danielle Van Niekerk & Ilze Bole (f)
  - Men's 1 km time trial winner: (South Africa) Jean Spies
  - Women's 500 m time trial winner: (South Africa) Charlene Du Preez
  - Team sprint winners: South Africa (m) / South Africa (f)
  - Team pursuit winners: Egypt (m) / South Africa (f)
- February 26 – March 1: 2020 UCI Track Cycling World Championships in Berlin
  - Sprint winners: (Netherlands) Harrie Lavreysen (m) / (Germany) Emma Hinze (f)
  - Keirin winners: (Netherlands) Harrie Lavreysen (m) / (Germany) Emma Hinze (f)
  - Individual pursuit winners: (Italy) Filippo Ganna (m) / (United States) Chloé Dygert Owen
  - Points race winners: (New Zealand) Corbin Strong (m) / (United Kingdom) Elinor Barker (f)
  - Scratch winners: (Belarus) Yauheni Karaliok / (Netherlands) Kirsten Wild (f)
  - Omnium winners: (France) Benjamin Thomas (m) / (Japan) Yumi Kajihara(f)
  - Madison winners: Denmark (Lasse Norman Hansen & Michael Mørkøv) (m) / Netherlands (Kirsten Wild & Amy Pieters) (f)
  - Men's 1 km time trial winner: (Netherlands) Sam Ligtlee
  - Women's 500 m time trial winner: (Germany) Lea Friedrich
  - Team sprint winners: Netherlands (m) / Germany (f)
  - Team pursuit winners: Denmark (m) / United States (f)

=== 2019–20 UCI Track Cycling World Cup ===
- November 1 – 3, 2019: TCWC #1 in (Belarus) Minsk
  - Keirin winners: (Netherlands) Harrie Lavreysen (m) / (Germany) Emma Hinze (f)
  - Madison winners: Denmark (Lasse Norman Hansen & Michael Mørkøv) (m) / Netherlands (Kirsten Wild & Amy Pieters) (f)
  - Omnium winners: (United Kingdom) Matthew Walls (m) / (United States) Jennifer Valente (f)
  - Points Race winners: (United Kingdom) Mark Stewart / (United States) Jennifer Valente (f)
  - Scratch winners: (Belarus) Yauheni Karaliok / (Netherlands) Kirsten Wild (f)
  - Sprint winners: (Netherlands) Harrie Lavreysen (m) / (Hong Kong) Lee Wai Sze (f)
  - Men's Elite Individual Pursuit winner: (Italy) Filippo Ganna
  - Men's Team Pursuit winners: Denmark (Rasmus Pedersen, Lasse Norman Hansen, Julius Johansen, & Frederik Rodenberg)
  - Men's Team Sprint winners: Netherlands (Nils van 't Hoenderdaal, Harrie Lavreysen, & Jeffrey Hoogland)
  - Women's Team Pursuit winners: United States (Jennifer Valente, Chloé Dygert Owen, Emma White, & Christina Birch)
  - Women's Team Sprint winners: Russia (Ekaterina Rogovaya & Daria Shmeleva)
- November 8 – 10, 2019: TCWC #2 in Glasgow
  - Keirin winners: (France) Sébastien Vigier (m) / (United Kingdom) Katy Marchant (f)
  - Madison winners: (France) Benjamin Thomas & Donavan Grondin (m) / Australia (Annette Edmondson & Georgia Baker) (f)
  - Omnium winners: (France) Benjamin Thomas (m) / (Netherlands) Kirsten Wild (f)
  - Scratch winners: (Republic of Ireland) Felix English (m) / (Poland) Karolina Karasiewicz (f)
  - Sprint winners: (Netherlands) Harrie Lavreysen (m) / (Hong Kong) Lee Wai Sze (f)
  - Men's Team Pursuit winners: Denmark (Rasmus Pedersen, Lasse Norman Hansen, Julius Johansen, Frederik Rodenberg)
  - Men's Team Sprint winners: Netherlands (Nils van 't Hoenderdaal, Harrie Lavreysen, Jeffrey Hoogland)
  - Women's Team Pursuit winners: United Kingdom (Ellie Dickinson, Neah Evans, Elinor Barker, Katie Archibald)
  - Women's Team Sprint winners: Russia (Ekaterina Rogovaya, Daria Shmeleva)
- November 29 – December 1, 2019: TCWC #3 in Hong Kong
  - Keirin winners: (New Zealand) Callum Saunders (m) / (South Korea) Lee Hye-jin (f)
  - Madison winners: Germany (Roger Kluge & Theo Reinhardt (m) / Denmark (Julie Leth & Trine Schmidt) (f)
  - Omnium winners: (New Zealand) Campbell Stewart (m) / (Japan) Yumi Kajihara (f)
  - Scratch winners: (Netherlands) Roy Eefting (m) / (Norway) Anita Stenberg (f)
  - Sprint winners: (Netherlands) Harrie Lavreysen (m) / (Hong Kong) Lee Wai Sze (f)
  - Men's Team Pursuit winners: Germany (Felix Groß, Leon Rohde, Domenic Weinstein, Theo Reinhardt)
  - Men's Team Sprint winners: Netherlands (Roy van den Berg, Harrie Lavreysen, Jeffrey Hoogland)
  - Women's Team Pursuit winners: New Zealand (Ally Wollaston, Emily Shearman, Michaela Drummond, Nicole Shields)
  - Women's Team Sprint winners: Germany (Pauline Grabosch, Emma Hinze)
- December 6 – 8, 2019: TCWC #4 in Cambridge
  - Keirin winners: (Malaysia) Azizulhasni Awang (m) / (South Korea) Lee Hye-jin (f)
  - Madison winners: New Zealand (Aaron Gate & Campbell Stewartt) (m) / Australia (Annette Edmondson & Georgia Baker) (f)
  - Omnium winners: (New Zealand) Campbell Stewart (m) / (Japan) Yumi Kajihara (f)
  - Scratch winners: (Ukraine) Roman Gladysh (m) / (New Zealand) Holly Edmondston (f)
  - Sprint winners: (Poland) Mateusz Rudyk (m) / (Russia) Anastasia Voynova (f)
  - Men's Team Pursuit winners: Switzerland (Robin Froidevaux, Claudio Imhof, Stefan Bissegger, Lukas Rüegg, Mauro Schmid)
  - Men's Team Sprint winners: Japan (Kazuki Amagai, Tomohiro Fukaya, Yudai Nitta)
  - Women's Team Pursuit winners: New Zealand (Rushlee Buchanan, Holly Edmondston, Bryony Botha, Kirstie James & Jaime Nielsen)
  - Women's Team Sprint winners: New Zealand (Natasha Hansen & Olivia Podmore)
- December 13 – 15, 2019: TCWC #5 in (Australia) Brisbane
- January 24 – 26: TCWC #6 (final) in (Canada) Milton

== Darts ==
=== Professional Darts Corporation ===
- December 13, 2019 – January 1: 2020 PDC World Darts Championship in (England) London
  - (Scotland) Peter Wright beat (Netherlands) Michael van Gerwen, 7–3
- January 31 – February 2: 2020 Masters in (England) Milton Keynes
  - (Scotland) Peter Wright beat (England) Michael Smith, 11–10
- February 6 – October 15: 2020 Premier League Darts at venues in Scotland, England, Wales and Ireland
  - (England) Glen Durrant beat (England) Nathan Aspinall, 11–8
- March 6 – 8: 2020 UK Open in (England) Minehead
  - (Netherlands) Michael van Gerwen beat (Wales) Gerwyn Price, 11–9
- July 18 – 26: 2020 World Matchplay in (England) Milton Keynes
  - (Belgium) Dimitri Van den Bergh beat (Scotland) Gary Anderson, 18–10
- September 5 – 6 : 2020 Champions League of Darts in (England) Leicester
  - Cancelled
- September 18 – 20: 2020 World Series of Darts Finals in (Austria) Salzburg
  - (Wales) Gerwyn Price beat (England) Rob Cross, 11–9
- October 6 – 12: 2020 World Grand Prix in (England) Coventry
  - (Wales) Gerwyn Price beat (Netherlands) Dirk van Duijvenbode, 5–2
- October 29 – November 1: 2020 European Championship in (Germany) Oberhausen
  - (Scotland) Peter Wright beat (England) James Wade 11–4
- November 6 – 8: 2020 PDC World Cup of Darts in (Austria) Salzburg
  - Wales beat England, 3–0
- November 16 – 24: 2020 Grand Slam of Darts in (England) Coventry
  - (Portugal) José de Sousa beat (England) James Wade, 16–12
- November 27 – 29: 2020 Players Championship Finals in (England) Coventry
  - (Netherlands) Michael van Gerwen beat (England) Mervyn King, 11–10
- November 29: 2020 PDC World Youth Championship Final in (England) Coventry

=== British Darts Organisation ===
- January 4 – 12: 2020 BDO World Darts Championship in (England) London
  - Men: (Wales) Wayne Warren beat (Wales) Jim Williams, 7–4
  - Women: (Japan) Mikuru Suzuki beat (England) Lisa Ashton, 3–0
- August 28 – 30: 2020 World Trophy in (England) Blackburn
  - Cancelled
- October 23 – 25: 2020 World Masters in (England) Purfleet
  - Cancelled

== Equestrianism ==
=== 2019–20 FEI World Cup Jumping ===
- April 4, 2019 – November 24, 2019: 2019 FEI World Cup Jumping – South League
  - Winner: (Brazil) José Roberto Reynoso Fernandez Filho with horse Azrael W
- April 18, 2019 – December 1, 2019: 2019 FEI World Cup Jumping – Japan League
  - Winner: (Japan) Masami Kawaguchi with horse Samurai Blue
- April 25, 2019 – November 10, 2019: 2019 FEI World Cup Jumping – Central Asian League
  - Winner: (Uzbekistan) Gairat Nazarov with horse Quatro Junior
- April 28, 2019 – October 7, 2019: 2019 FEI World Cup Jumping – China League
  - Winner: (China) Jirigala Erdeng with horse Brikibo Vd Bosbeek
- May 2, 2019 – February 7, 2020: 2019–20 FEI World Cup Jumping – Caucasus-Caspian League
- May 2, 2019 – March 15, 2020: 2019–20 FEI World Cup Jumping – Central European League
  - North CEL winner:
  - South CEL winner:
    - March 12 – 15: 2020 Central European League Final in (Poland) Warsaw
      - Winner:
    - Overall winner:
- May 8, 2019 – October 27, 2019: 2019 FEI World Cup Jumping – (South Africa) South African League
  - Winner: (South Africa) Christopher Van Der Merwe with horse Chantilly
- July 12, 2019 – November 10, 2019: 2019 FEI World Cup Jumping – South East Asian League
  - Winner: (Thailand) Jaruporn Limpichati with horse Irregular Choice
- July 27, 2019 – February 2, 2020: 2019–20 FEI World Cup Jumping – (Australia) Australian League
- August 20, 2019 – March 8, 2020: 2019–20 FEI World Cup Jumping – North American League
  - Western winner:
  - Eastern winner:
- October 3, 2019 – February 8, 2020: 2019–20 FEI World Cup Jumping – Arab League
  - North African winner:
  - Middle East winner:
- October 16, 2019 – February 23, 2020: 2019–20 FEI World Cup Jumping – (European Union) Western European League
- October 25, 2019 – January 5, 2020: 2019–20 FEI World Cup Jumping – New Zealand League

=== 2019–20 FEI World Cup Dressage ===
- March 22, 2019 – December 15, 2019: 2019 FEI World Cup Dressage – (Pacific Community) Pacific League
  - Winner: (New Zealand) Wendi Williamson with horse Don Amour MH
- April 10, 2019 – April 26, 2020: 2019–20 FEI World Cup Dressage – North American League
- April 17, 2019 – April 26, 2020: 2019–20 FEI World Cup Dressage – Central European League
- October 16, 2019 – March 15, 2020: 2019–20 FEI World Cup Dressage – (European Union) Western European League

=== 2020 Show Jumping World Cup and Dressage World Cup Finals ===
- April 15 – 19: 2020 FEI World Cup Show Jumping and Dressage Finals in (United States) Las Vegas

== Figure skating ==
=== Figure skating at the 2020 Winter Youth Olympics ===
January 10 – 15: in (Switzerland) Lausanne

- Men: (Japan) Yuma Kagiyama
- Ladies: (South Korea) You Young
- Pairs: (Russia) Apollinariia Panfilova & Dmitry Rylov
- Ice Dancing: (Russia) Irina Khavronina & Dario Chirizano
- Mixed NOC Teams: Team Courage (MIX)
  - (Estonia) Arlet Levandi (Men)
  - (Russia) Ksenia Sinitsyna (Ladies)
  - (Georgia (country)) Alina Butaeva / Luka Berulava (Pairs)
  - (Japan) Utana Yoshida / Shingo Nishiyama (Ice Dancing)

=== International figure skating events ===
- January 20 – 26: 2020 European Figure Skating Championships in (Austria) Graz
- February 4 – 9: 2020 Four Continents Figure Skating Championships in (South Korea) Seoul
- March 2 – 8: 2020 World Junior Figure Skating Championships in (Estonia) Tallinn
- March 16 – 22: 2020 World Figure Skating Championships in (Canada) Montreal

=== 2019–20 ISU Grand Prix of Figure Skating ===
- October 18 – 20, 2019: 2019 Skate America in Las Vegas
  - Men's winner: (United States) Nathan Chen
  - Ladies' winner: (Russia) Anna Shcherbakova
  - Pairs winners: China (Peng Cheng & Jin Yang)
  - Ice Dance winners: United States (Madison Hubbell & Zachary Donohue)
- October 25 – 27, 2019: 2019 Skate Canada International in Kelowna
  - Men's winner: (Japan) Yuzuru Hanyu
  - Ladies' winner: (Russia) Alexandra Trusova
  - Pairs winners: Russia (Aleksandra Boikova & Dmitrii Kozlovskii)
  - Ice Dance winners: Canada (Piper Gilles & Paul Poirier)
- November 1 – 3, 2019: 2019 Internationaux de France in Grenoble
  - Men's winner: (United States) Nathan Chen
  - Ladies' winner: (Russia) Alena Kostornaia
  - Pairs winners: Russia (Anastasia Mishina & Aleksandr Galliamov)
  - Ice Dance winners: France (Gabriella Papadakis & Guillaume Cizeron)
- November 8 – 10, 2019: 2019 Cup of China in Chongqing
  - Men's winner: (China) Jin Boyang
  - Ladies' winner: (Russia) Anna Shcherbakova
  - Pairs winners: China (Sui Wenjing & Han Cong)
  - Ice Dance winners: Russia (Victoria Sinitsina & Nikita Katsalapov)
- November 15 – 17, 2019: 2019 Rostelecom Cup in (Russia) Moscow
  - Men's winner: (Russia) Alexander Samarin
  - Ladies' winner: (Russia) Alexandra Trusova
  - Pairs winners: (Russia) (Aleksandra Boikova & Dmitrii Kozlovskii)
  - Ice Dance winners: (Russia) (Victoria Sinitsina & Nikita Katsalapov)
- November 22 – 24, 2019: 2019 NHK Trophy in (Japan) Sapporo
  - Men's winner: (Japan) Yuzuru Hanyu
  - Ladies' winner: (Russia) Alena Kostornaia
  - Pairs winners: (China) (Sui Wenjing & Han Cong)
  - Ice Dance winners: (France) (Gabriella Papadakis & Guillaume Cizeron)
- December 5 – 8, 2019: 2019–20 Grand Prix of Figure Skating Final in (Italy) Turin
  - Men's winner: (United States) Nathan Chen
  - Ladies' winner: (Russia) Alena Kostornaia
  - Pairs winners: (China) (Sui Wenjing & Han Cong)
  - Ice Dance winners: (France) (Gabriella Papadakis & Guillaume Cizeron)

=== 2019–20 ISU Junior Grand Prix of Figure Skating ===
- August 21 – 24, 2019: JGP #1 in (France) Courchevel
  - Note: There was no junior pairs event here.
  - Junior Men's winner: (Japan) Yuma Kagiyama
  - Junior Ladies' winner: (Russia) Kamila Valieva
  - Junior Ice Dance winners: Russia (Elizaveta Shanaeva & Devid Naryzhnyy)
- August 28 – 31, 2019: JGP #2 in Lake Placid
  - Junior Men's winner: (Japan) Shun Sato
  - Junior Ladies' winner: (United States) Alysa Liu
  - Junior Pairs winners: Russia (Apollinariia Panfilova & Dmitry Rylov)
  - Junior Ice Dance winners: United States (Avonley Nguyen & Vadym Kolesnik)
- September 4 – 7, 2019: JGP #3 in (Latvia) Riga
  - Note: There was no junior pairs event here.
  - Junior Men's winner: (Russia) Andrei Mozalev
  - Junior Ladies' winner: (South Korea) Lee Hae-in
  - Junior Ice Dance winners: Russia (Elizaveta Khudaiberdieva & Andrey Filatov)
- September 11 – 14, 2019: JGP #4 in Chelyabinsk
  - Junior Men's winner: (Russia) Petr Gumennik
  - Junior Ladies' winner: (Russia) Kamila Valieva
  - Junior Pairs winners: Russia (Kseniia Akhanteva & Valerii Kolesov)
  - Junior Ice Dance winners: Russia (Elizaveta Shanaeva & Devid Naryzhnyy)
- September 18 – 21, 2019: JGP #5 in (Poland) Gdańsk
  - Junior Men's winner: (Russia) Daniil Samsonov
  - Junior Ladies' winner: (United States) Alysa Liu
  - Junior Pairs winners: Russia (Apollinariia Panfilova & Dmitry Rylov)
  - Junior Ice Dance winners: United States (Avonley Nguyen & Vadym Kolesnik)
- September 25 – 28, 2019: JGP #6 in (Croatia) Zagreb
  - Junior Men's winner: (Russia) Andrei Mozalev
  - Junior Ladies' winner: (South Korea) Lee Hae-in
  - Junior Pairs winners: Russia (Iuliia Artemeva & Mikhail Nazarychev)
  - Junior Ice Dance winners: Georgia (Maria Kazakova & Georgy Reviya)
- October 2 – 5, 2019: JGP #7 in (Italy) Egna
  - Note: There was no junior pairs event here.
  - Junior Men's winner: (Italy) Daniel Grassl
  - Junior Ladies' winner: (Russia) Ksenia Sinitsyna
  - Junior Ice Dance winners: Russia (Elizaveta Khudaiberdieva & Andrey Filatov)
- December 5 – 8, 2019: 2019–20 Grand Prix of Figure Skating Final in (Italy) Turin
  - Junior Men's winner: (Japan) Shun Sato
  - Junior Ladies' winner: (Russia) Kamila Valieva
  - Junior Pairs winners: Russia (Apollinariia Panfilova & Dmitry Rylov)
  - Junior Ice Dance winners: Georgia (Maria Kazakova & Georgy Reviya)

== Floorball ==
- Men's World Floorball Championships – postponed to 2021
- Women's under-19 World Floorball Championships – postponed to 2021
- Champions Cup
  - Men's champion: (Sweden) Storvreta IBK
  - Women's champion: (Sweden) Täby FC

== Futsal ==
=== International futsal events ===
- July 19 – 26: 2020 World University Futsal Championships in (Poland) Poznań

=== FIFA (futsal) ===
- September 12 – October 4: 2020 FIFA Futsal World Cup in Lithuania

=== UEFA (futsal) ===
- TBA: 2019–20 UEFA Futsal Champions League Finals in (location TBA)

=== CONMEBOL (futsal) ===
National teams

- TBA: 2019 Copa América de Futsal (location TBA)
- TBA: 2019 Copa América Femenina de Futsal (location TBA)

Clubs

- TBA: 2019 Copa Libertadores de Futsal
- TBA: 2019 Copa Libertadores Femenina de Futsal

=== AFC (futsal) ===
- February 27 – March 8: 2020 AFC Futsal Championship (location TBA)
- July 3 – 12: 2020 AFC Women's Futsal Championship (location TBA)

=== CAF (futsal) ===
- April: 2020 Africa Futsal Cup of Nations in Morocco

== Golf ==
=== 2020 Summer Olympics (Golf) ===
- Postponed to 2021

=== 2020 Men's major golf championships ===
Three of the four major championships were rescheduled due to the COVID-19 pandemic, and one was canceled.

- July 16 – 19: 2020 Open Championship
  - Canceled; the planned site of (England) Royal St George's Golf Club in Sandwich, Kent will instead host in 2021
- August 6 – 9 (originally May 14 – 17): 2020 PGA Championship in (California) San Francisco
  - Winner: (United States) Collin Morikawa (1st major title, & 3rd PGA Tour win)
- September 17 – 20 (originally June 18 – 21): 2020 U.S. Open in (New York (state)) Mamaroneck
- November 12 – 15 (originally April 9 – 12): 2020 Masters Tournament in (Georgia (U.S. state)) Augusta

=== 2020 World Golf Championships (WGC) ===
One of the four championships was rescheduled due to the pandemic, and one was canceled.

- February 21– 24: 2020 WGC-Mexico Championship in Mexico City
  - Winner: (United States) Patrick Reed (second WGC-Mexico Championship win, 8th PGA Tour win)
- March 27 – 31: 2020 WGC-Dell Technologies Match Play in (Texas) Austin
  - Canceled
- July 25 – 28 (originally July 2 – 5): 2020 WGC-FedEx St. Jude Invitational in (Tennessee) Memphis
- TBA: 2020 WGC-HSBC Champions (location TBA)

=== 2020 Women's major golf championships ===
Three of the five major championships were rescheduled due to the pandemic.

- June 25 – 28: 2020 Women's PGA Championship in Newtown Township, Delaware County, Pennsylvania
- August 6 – 9 (originally July 23 – 26): 2020 Evian Championship in (France) Évian-les-Bains
  - Canceled
- August 20 – 23: 2020 Women's British Open in (Scotland) Troon
- September 10 – 13 (originally April 2 – 5): 2020 ANA Inspiration in Rancho Mirage, California
- December 10 – 13 (originally June 4 – 7): 2020 U.S. Women's Open in (Texas) Houston

=== 2020 Senior major golf championships ===
Two of the five major championships were canceled due to the pandemic.

- May 21 – 24: Senior PGA Championship in Benton Harbor, Michigan
  - Canceled
- June 25 – 28: U.S. Senior Open in Newport, Rhode Island
  - Canceled
- July 9 – 12: Senior Players Championship in Akron, Ohio
- July 23 – 26: Senior Open Championship in (England) Sunningdale
- September 24 – 27 (originally May 7 – 10): Regions Tradition in Birmingham, Alabama

=== 2020 Legends Tour (Senior women's major golf championships) ===
One of the two major championships were canceled due to the pandemic.

- July 9 – 12: U.S. Senior Women's Open in Fairfield, Connecticut
- July 30 – August 1: Senior LPGA Championship in French Lick, Indiana
  - Canceled

=== Other major professional golf events ===
- March 12 – 15: 2020 Players Championship in Ponte Vedra Beach, Florida
  - Canceled following the conclusion of the first round
- September 10 – 13: 2020 BMW PGA Championship in (England) Virginia Water
- September 25 – 27: 2020 Ryder Cup in Haven, Wisconsin

=== Major amateur golf events ===
- June 12–14: 2020 Curtis Cup in (Wales) Conwy
  - Postponed until 2021
- August 3–9: 2020 U.S. Women's Amateur in Rockville, Maryland
- August 10–16: 2020 U.S. Amateur in Bandon, Oregon
- August 24–29: (originally June 15–20): 2020 Amateur Championship in (England) Southport, Lancashire
- August 24–29: (originally June 23–27): 2020 British Ladies Amateur in (Scotland) Kilmarnock, East Ayrshire
- TBA: 2020 World Amateur Team Championships in Hong Kong

== Gymnastics ==
=== Acrobatic gymnastics ===
- May 29 – 31: 2020 FIG Acrobatic Gymnastics World Championships in (Switzerland) Geneva

=== Aerobic gymnastics ===
- May 14 – 16: 2020 FIG Aerobic Gymnastics World Championships in (Azerbaijan) Baku

=== Artistic gymnastics ===
- February 13 – 16: FIG World Cup 2020 (AG #1) in (Australia) Melbourne
- March 7: American Cup All-Around (FIG World Cup 2020 (IAA #1)) in (United States) Milwaukee
- March 12 – 15: FIG World Cup 2020 (AG #2) in (Azerbaijan) Baku
- March 21 & 22: EnBW DTB-Pokal Individual All-Around (FIG World Cup 2020 (IAA #2)) in (Germany) Stuttgart
- March 25 – 28: FIG World Cup 2020 (AG #3) in (Qatar) Doha
- March 28: FIG World Cup 2020 (IAA #3) in (United Kingdom) Birmingham
- April 4 & 5: FIG World Cup 2020 (IAA #4) in (Japan) Tokyo

=== Rhythmic gymnastics ===
- April 3 – 5: FIG World Cup 2020 (RG #1) in (Italy) Pesaro
- April 10 – 12: FIG World Cup 2020 (RG #2) in (Bulgaria) Sofia
- April 17 – 19: FIG World Cup 2020 (RG #3) in (Uzbekistan) Tashkent
- April 24 – 26: FIG World Cup 2020 (RG #4) in (Azerbaijan) Baku
- May 2 & 3: RG International Tournament - RITAM CUP 2020 in (Serbia) Belgrade

=== Trampolining & Tumbling ===
- February 15 & 16: FIG TRA World Cup 2020 #1 in (Azerbaijan) Baku
- March 14 & 15: Dutch Trampoline Open 2020 in (Netherlands) Alkmaar
- April 24 & 25: FIG TRA World Cup 2020 #2 in (Italy) Brescia
- July 3 & 4: FIG TRA World Cup 2020 #3 in (Switzerland) Arosa

== Handball ==
=== International handball events ===
- June 15 – 21: 2020 World University Handball Championship in (Poland) Łódź

=== Continental handball championships ===
- January 9 – 26: 2020 European Men's Handball Championship in Austria, Norway, & Sweden
  - In the final, Spain defeated Croatia, 22–20, to win their 2nd European Men's Handball Championship title.
  - Norway took third place.
- December 3 – 20: 2020 European Women's Handball Championship in Denmark
  - In the final, Norway defeated France, 22–20, to win their 8th European Women's Handball Championship title.
  - Croatia took third place.

=== EHF ===
- September 11, 2019 – May 31: 2019–20 EHF Champions League
  - In the final, (Germany) THW Kiel defeated (Spain) Barça, 33–28, to win their 4th EHF Champions League title.
  - (France) Paris Saint-Germain took third place.
- September 7, 2019 – May 10: 2019–20 Women's EHF Champions League
- August 31, 2019 – May 24: 2019–20 EHF Cup
- September 7, 2019 – May 10: 2019–20 Women's EHF Cup
- October 5, 2019 – May 24: 2019–20 EHF Challenge Cup
- November 9, 2019 – May 10: 2019–20 Women's EHF Challenge Cup

Other competitions

- August 30, 2019 –: 2019–2020 MOL Liga
- September 3, 2019 – April 4: 2019–20 SEHA League
  - In the final, (Hungary) Telekom Veszprém defeated (North Macedonia) Vardar 1961, 35–27, to win their 3rd SEHA League title.
  - (Belarus) Meshkov Brest took third place.
- September 7, 2019 –: 2019–2020 BeNe League
- September 22, 2019 –: 2019–2020 Baltic Handball League

=== South and Central America ===
National teams

- January 21 – 25: 2020 South and Central American Men's Handball Championship in Maringá
  - Argentina won the round robin tournament with Brazil in second and Uruguay in third.
  - Note: All teams mentioned above have qualified to compete at the 2021 World Men's Handball Championship.

== Horse racing ==
=== United States ===
US Triple Crown

- June 20: 2020 Belmont Stakes at (New York (state)) Belmont Park.
- September 5: 2020 Kentucky Derby at Churchill Downs.
- October 3: 2020 Preakness Stakes at (Maryland) Pimlico.

Breeders' Cup

- Nov 6–7: 2020 Breeders' Cup at (Kentucky) Churchill Downs.

=== United Kingdom ===
British Classic Races

- TBA: 2020 2,000 Guineas at (United Kingdom) Newmarket
- TBA: 2020 1,000 Guineas at (United Kingdom) Newmarket
- TBA: 2020 Epsom Oaks at (United Kingdom) Epsom
- TBA: 2020 Epsom Derby at (United Kingdom) Epsom
- September 12: 2020 St Leger at (United Kingdom) Doncaster

== Ice hockey ==
=== 2020 Winter Youth Olympics (Ice hockey) ===
- January 10 – 22: Ice hockey at the 2020 Winter Youth Olympics in (Switzerland) Lausanne
  - Boys' team winners: (gold) Russia, (silver) United States, (bronze) Canada
  - Boys' 3x3 mixed tournament winners: (gold) Team Green (MIX), (silver) Team Red (MIX), (bronze) Team Brown (MIX)
  - Girls' team winners: (gold) Japan, (silver) Sweden, (bronze) Slovakia
  - Girls' 3x3 mixed tournament winners: (gold) Team Yellow (MIX), (silver) Team Black (MIX), (bronze) Team Blue (MIX)

=== Main world ice hockey championships ===
- December 26, 2019 – January 2, 2020: 2020 IIHF World Women's U18 Championship in (Slovakia) Bratislava
  - United States defeated Canada, 2–1 in overtime, to win their eighth IIHF World Women's U18 Championship title.
  - Russia took third place.
- December 26, 2019 – January 5, 2020: 2020 World Junior Ice Hockey Championships in (Czech Republic) Ostrava & Třinec
  - Canada defeated Russia, 4–3, to win their eighteenth World Junior Ice Hockey Championship title.
  - Sweden took third place.
- March 31 – April 10: 2020 IIHF Women's World Championship in (Canada) Halifax & Truro
- April 16 – 26: 2020 IIHF World U18 Championships in (United States) Ann Arbor & Plymouth
- May 8 – 24: 2020 IIHF World Championship in (Switzerland) Zürich & Lausanne

=== 2020 IIHF Ice Hockey World Championships Divisions ===
- March 2 – 8: 2020 IIHF World Championship Division IV in (Kyrgyzstan) Bishkek
- April 19 – 25: Division II – Group A in (Croatia) Zagreb
- April 19 – 25: Division II – Group B in (Iceland) Reykjavík
- April 19 – 25: Division III – Group A in (Luxembourg) Kockelscheuer
- April 20 – 26: Division III – Group B in (South Africa) Cape Town
- April 24 – 30: Division I – Group A in (Slovenia) Ljubljana
- April 26 – May 2: Division I – Group B in (Poland) Katowice

=== 2020 IIHF World U20 Championships (Junior) Divisions ===
- December 8 – 14, 2019: Division I – Group A in Minsk
  - Final Round Robin Ranking: 1. Austria, 2. Latvia, 3. Belarus, 4. Norway, 5. Denmark, 6. Slovenia
  - Austria was promoted to Top Division for 2021. Slovenia was relegated to Division I – Group B for 2021.
- December 12 – 18, 2019: Division I – Group B in Kyiv
  - Final Round Robin Ranking: 1. Hungary, 2. France, 3. Ukraine, 4. Poland, 5. Estonia, 6. Italy
  - Hungary was promoted to Division I – Group A for 2021. Italy was relegated to Division II – Group A for 2021.
- January 6 – 12: Division II – Group A in Vilnius
  - Final Round Robin Ranking: 1. Japan, 2. Great Britain, 3. Lithuania, 4. Romania, 5. Spain, 6. Serbia
  - Japan was promoted to Division I – Group B for 2021. Serbia was relegated to Division II – Group B for 2021.
- January 13 – 19: 2020 World Junior Ice Hockey Championships – Division III in Sofia
  - Final Round Robin Ranking: 1. Iceland, 2. Australia, 3. Turkey, 4. Mexico, 5. Bulgaria, 6. New Zealand, 7. Chinese Taipei, 8. South Africa
  - Iceland was promoted to Division II – Group B for 2021.
- January 28 – February 3: Division II – Group B in Gangneung
  - Final Round Robin Ranking: 1. South Korea, 2. Netherlands, 3. China, 4. Croatia, 5. Belgium, 6. Israel
  - South Korea was promoted to Division II – Group A for 2021. Israel was relegated to Division III for 2021.

=== 2020 IIHF World U18 Championships Divisions ===
- March 16 – 22: Division III – Group A in (Turkey) Istanbul
- March 21 – 27: Division II – Group B in (China) Tianjin
- March 22 – 28: Division II – Group A in (Estonia) Tallinn
- March 29 – April 4: Division III – Group B in (Luxembourg) Kockelscheuer
- April 12 – 18: Division I – Group B in (Italy) Asiago
- April 13 – 19: Division I – Group A in (Slovakia) Piešťany

=== 2020 IIHF Women's World Championships Divisions ===
- December 4 – 10, 2019: 2020 IIHF Women's World Championship Division III in Sofia
  - Final Round Robin Ranking: 1. South Africa, 2. Belgium, 3. Romania, 4. Bulgaria, 5. Lithuania, 6. Hong Kong
  - South Africa was promoted to Division II – Group B for 2021.
- February 23 – 29: Division II – Group B in Akureyri
  - Final Round Robin Ranking: 1. Australia, 2. Iceland, 3. New Zealand, 4. Turkey, 5. Croatia, 6. Ukraine
  - Australia was promoted to Division II – Group A for 2021. Ukraine was relegated to Division III for 2021.
- March 28 – April 3: Division I – Group B in (Poland) Katowice
- March 29 – April 4: Division II – Group A in (Spain) Granada
- April 12 – 18: Division I – Group A in (France) Angers

=== 2020 IIHF World Women's U18 Championships Divisions ===
- January 2 – 8: Division I – Group B in Katowice
  - Final Ranking: 1. Norway, 2. Austria, 3. China, 4. South Korea, 5. Poland, 6. Great Britain
  - Norway was promoted to Division I – Group A for 2021. Great Britain was relegated to Division II – Group A for 2021.
- January 3 – 9: Division I – Group A in Füssen
  - Final Ranking: 1. Germany, 2. Japan, 3. Hungary, 4. France, 5. Italy, 6. Denmark
  - Germany was promoted to Top Division for 2021. Denmark was relegated to Division I – Group B for 2021.
- January 25 – 28: Division II – Group A in Eindhoven
  - Final Ranking: 1. Chinese Taipei, 2. Netherlands, 3. Australia, 4. Kazakhstan
  - Chinese Taipei was promoted to Division I – Group B for 2021. Kazakhstan was relegated to Division II – Group B for 2021.
- January 30 – February 2: Division II – Group B in Mexico City
  - Final Ranking: 1. Spain, 2. Turkey, 3. Mexico, 4. New Zealand
  - Spain was promoted to Division II – Group A for 2021.

=== National Hockey League (NHL) ===
- October 2, 2019 – March 12, 2020: 2019–20 NHL season
  - Presidents' Trophy and Eastern Conference winners: (Massachusetts) Boston Bruins
  - Western Conference winners: (Missouri) St. Louis Blues
  - Art Ross Trophy winner: (Germany) Leon Draisaitl ( (Alberta) Edmonton Oilers)
- October 4, 2019 – November 9, 2019: 2019 NHL Global Series
  - Game #1 at the O2 Arena in (Czech Republic) Prague
    - The (Pennsylvania) Philadelphia Flyers defeated the (Illinois) Chicago Blackhawks, with the score of 4–3.
  - Games #2 & #3 at the Ericsson Globe in (Sweden) Stockholm
    - Game #2: The (Florida) Tampa Bay Lightning defeated the (New York (state)) Buffalo Sabres, with the score of 3–2.
    - Game #3: The Tampa Bay Lightning defeated the Buffalo Sabres again, with the score of 5–3.
- October 26, 2019: 2019 Heritage Classic at the Mosaic Stadium in (Saskatchewan) Regina
  - The (Manitoba) Winnipeg Jets defeated the (Alberta) Calgary Flames, with the score of 2–1.
- January 1: 2020 NHL Winter Classic at the Cotton Bowl in (Texas) Dallas
  - The (Texas) Dallas Stars defeated the (Tennessee) Nashville Predators, with the score of 4–2.
- January 24 – 26: 2020 National Hockey League All-Star Game (Weekend) at the Enterprise Center In (Missouri) St. Louis
- February 15: 2020 NHL Stadium Series at the Falcon Stadium in Colorado Springs
  - The (California) Los Angeles Kings defeated the Colorado Avalanche, with the score of 3–1.
- August 1 – September 28: 2020 Stanley Cup playoffs
  - The (Florida) Tampa Bay Lightning defeated the (Texas) Dallas Stars, 4–2 in games played, to win their second Stanley Cup championship.
- October 6 & 7: 2020 NHL entry draft

=== North America (Ice hockey) ===
- Note: The Canadian Women's Hockey League has ceased its operations and it is now defunct.

==== United States (AHL/ECHL/USHL) ====
- October 4, 2019 – April 11: 2019–20 AHL season
- October 11, 2019 – April 5: 2019–20 ECHL season
- TBA: 2019–20 USHL season

==== Junior (OHL/QMJHL/WHL) ====
- September 19, 2019 – March 21: 2019–20 QMJHL season
- September 19, 2019 – March 22: 2019–20 OHL season
- September 20, 2019 – March 22: 2019–20 WHL season

==== College (USA–NCAA–Division I) ====
- March 27 – April 11: 2020 NCAA Division I Men's Ice Hockey Tournament (Frozen Four at Little Caesars Arena in (Michigan) Detroit)
- TBA: 2020 NCAA National Collegiate Women's Ice Hockey Tournament

==== Women (NWHL) ====
- October 19, 2019 – March 1, 2020: 2019–20 NWHL season
- November 2020 – March 2021: 2020–21 NWHL season

=== Europe (Ice hockey) ===
- August 29, 2019 – February 4, 2020: 2019–20 Champions Hockey League
  - (Sweden) Frölunda HC defeated (Czech Republic) Mountfield HK, 3–1, to win their second consecutive and fourth Champions Hockey League title.
  - (Sweden) Djurgårdens IF and (Sweden) Luleå HF finished in joint third place, as the losing semi-finalists.
- September 20, 2019 – January 12: 2019–20 IIHF Continental Cup
  - Final Ranking: 1. (Denmark) SønderjyskE Ishockey, 2. (United Kingdom) Nottingham Panthers, 3. (Belarus) HC Neman Grodno, 4. (Poland) KS Cracovia

==== Finland ====
- September 2019 – March 2020: 2019–20 Liiga season
- 7 September 2019 – 12 March 2020: 2019–20 Naisten Liiga season

=== Asia (Ice hockey) ===
- August 31, 2019 – February 16: 2019–20 Asia League Ice Hockey season
  - February 22 – March 8: 2019–20 Asia League Ice Hockey Playoffs
- TBA: 2020 IIHF Ice Hockey Challenge Cup of Asia
- TBA: 2020 IIHF Ice Hockey U20 Challenge Cup of Asia
- TBA: 2020 IIHF Ice Hockey U20 Challenge Cup of Asia Division I
- TBA: 2020 IIHF Ice Hockey Women's Challenge Cup of Asia
- TBA: 2020 IIHF Ice Hockey Women's Challenge Cup of Asia Division I

== Lacrosse ==
=== International lacrosse events ===
- July 9 – 18: 2020 Men's U19 World Lacrosse Championship in (Republic of Ireland) Limerick
- July 23 – August 1: 2020 European Lacrosse Championship in (Poland) Wrocław

=== National Lacrosse League ===
- November 29, 2019 – April 25, 2020: 2020 NLL season

== Modern pentathlon ==
=== International modern pentathlon events ===
- July 7 – 11: 2020 World University Modern Pentathlon Championships in (Portugal) Vila Real

== Motorsport ==
=== 2020 Formula One World Championship ===
- July 3–5: 2020 Austrian Grand Prix in (Austria) Spielberg
  - Winner: (Finland) Valtteri Bottas ( (Germany) Mercedes)
- July 12: 2020 Styrian Grand Prix in (Austria) Spielberg
  - Winner: (United Kingdom) Lewis Hamilton ( (Germany) Mercedes)

=== 2020 Formula 2 Championship ===
- July 4 & 5: 2020 Spielberg Formula 2 round in (Austria) Spielberg
  - Feature Race winner: (United Kingdom) Callum Ilott ( (United Kingdom) UNI-Virtuosi)
  - Sprint Race winner: (Brazil) Felipe Drugovich ( (Netherlands) MP Motorsport)
- July 11 & 12: 2020 2nd Spielberg Formula 2 round in (Austria) Spielberg
  - Feature Race winner: (Russia) Robert Shwartzman ( (Italy) Prema Racing)
  - Sprint Race winner: (Denmark) Christian Lundgaard ( (France) ART Grand Prix)
- July 18 & 19: 2020 Hungaroring Formula 2 round in (Hungary) Hungaroring
  - Feature Race winner: (Russia) Robert Shwartzmnan ( (Italy) Prema Racing)

=== 2020 FIA Formula 3 Championship ===
- July 4 & 5: 2020 Spielberg Formula 3 round in (Austria) Spielberg
  - Race #1 winner: (Australia) Oscar Piastri ( (Italy) Prema Racing)
  - Race #2 winner: (New Zealand) Liam Lawson ( (United Kingdom) Hitech Grand Prix)
- July 11 & 12: 2020 2nd Spielberg Formula 3 round in (Austria) Spielberg
  - Race #1 winner: (Denmark) Frederik Vesti ( (Italy) Prema Racing)
  - Race #2 winner: (France) Théo Pourchaire ( (France) ART Grand Prix)
- July 18 & 19: 2020 Hungaroring Formula 3 round in (Hungary) Hungaroring
  - Race #1 winner: (France) Théo Pourchaire ( (France) ART Grand Prix)

=== 2019–20 Formula E season ===
- November 21 – 23, 2019: (Saudi Arabia) 2019 Diriyah ePrix
  - Winner #1: (United Kingdom) Sam Bird
  - Winner #2: (United Kingdom) Alexander Sims
- January 18: (Chile) 2020 Santiago ePrix
  - Winner: (Germany) Maximilian Günther
- February 18: 2020 Mexico City ePrix
  - Winner: (New Zealand) Mitch Evans
- February 29: (Morocco) 2020 Marrakesh ePrix
  - Winner: (Portugal) António Félix da Costa

=== 2019–20 FIA World Endurance Championship ===
- September 1, 2019: (United Kingdom) 2019 FIA WEC 4 Hours of Silverstone
  - LMP1 Winners: (Japan) No. 7 Toyota Gazoo Racing
  - LMP2 Winners: (Switzerland) No. 42 Cool Racing
  - LMGTE Pro Winners: (Germany) No. 91 Porsche GT Team
  - LMGTE Am Winners: (Italy) No. 83 AF Corse
- October 6, 2019: (Japan) 2019 6 Hours of Fuji
  - LMP1 Winners: (Japan) No. 7 Toyota Gazoo Racing
  - LMP2 Winners: (Netherlands) No. 29 Racing Team Nederland
  - LMGTE Pro Winners: (United Kingdom) No. 95 Aston Martin Racing
  - LMGTE Am Winners: (United Kingdom) No. 90 TF Sport
- November 10, 2019: (China) 2019 4 Hours of Shanghai
  - LMP1 Winners: (Switzerland) No. 1 Rebellion Racing
  - LMP2 Winners: (United Kingdom) No. 38 Jota Sport
  - LMGTE Pro Winners: (Germany) No. 92 Porsche GT Team
  - LMGTE Am Winners: (United Kingdom) No. 90 TF Sport
- December 14, 2019: 2019 8 Hours of Bahrain
  - LMP1 Winners: (Japan) No. 7 Toyota Gazoo Racing
  - LMP2 Winners: (United Kingdom) No. 22 United Autosports
  - LMGTE Pro Winners: (United Kingdom) No. 95 Aston Martin Racing
  - LMGTE Am Winners: (Germany) No. 57 Team Project 1
- February 23: (United States) 2020 Lone Star Le Mans
  - LMP1 Winners: (Switzerland) No. 1 Rebellion Racing
  - LMP2 Winners: (United Kingdom) No. 22 United Autosports
  - LMGTE Pro Winners: (United Kingdom) No. 95 Aston Martin Racing
  - LMGTE Am Winners: (United Kingdom) No. 90 TF Sport

=== Dakar Rally ===
- January 5 – 17: 2020 Dakar Rally in Saudi Arabia
  - Bikes winner: (United States) Ricky Brabec (Monster Energy Honda Team)
  - Cars winner: (Spain) Carlos Sainz (Bahrain JCW X-Raid Team)
  - Quads winner: (Chile) Ignacio Casale (Casale Racing)
  - SxS winner: (United States) Casey Currie (Monster Energy Can-Am)
  - Trucks winner: (Russia) Andrey Karginov (Kamaz-Master)

== Multi-sport events ==
- January 9 – 22: 2020 Winter Youth Olympics in Lausanne
  - Russia & Switzerland won 10 Olympic gold medals each.
  - Russia won the overall medal tally.
- March 15 – 21: 2020 Arctic Winter Games in (Canada) / (Yukon) Whitehorse
- July 12 – 18: 2020 North American Indigenous Games in (Canada) / (Nova Scotia) Halifax

== Netball ==
International tournaments

Date	Tournament	Winners	Runners up
19–26 January	2020 Netball Nations Cup	Australia	Jamaica
28 Oct–1 Nov	2020 Taini Jamison Trophy Series	New Zealand	England
26–29 November	2020 South Africa Malawi netball series	South Africa	Malawi

Major national leagues

Host	League	Winners	Runners up
Australia	Suncorp Super Netball	Melbourne Vixens	West Coast Fever
New Zealand	ANZ Premiership	Central Pulse	Mainland Tactix
United Kingdom	Netball Superleague	^{(Note 1)}	

== Pickleball ==
- July 3: Bainbridge Cup cancelled due to COVID-19 pandemic. English Open Pickleball Tournament also cancelled.
- 2020 Margaritaville USA Pickleball National Championships in Indian Wells, California – Cancelled "due to on-going concerns from the COVID-19 pandemic".

== Racquetball ==
=== Men’s Professional International Racquetball Tour ===
- September 5–8, 2019: The Atlanta Open in (Georgia (U.S. state)) Lilburn
  - Singles: (United States) Rocky Carson defeated (Mexico) Andree Parrilla, 15–13, 15–8.
  - Doubles: Not played.
- September 19–22, 2019: The Valentine Open in (Maryland) Laurel
  - Singles: (Canada) Kane Waselenchuk defeated (United States) Rocky Carson, 15-(-1), 11–15, 11–4.
  - Doubles: Not played.
- October 2–6, 2019: US Open Racquetball Championships in (Minnesota) Minneapolis
  - Singles: (Canada) Kane Waselenchuk defeated (Bolivia) Conrrado Moscoso, 15–12, 15–5.
  - Doubles: (Canada) Kane Waselenchuk & (United States) Ben Croft defeated (Mexico) Daniel de la Rosa & (Mexico) Álvaro Beltrán, 15–11, 15–8.
- October 24–27, 2019: Arizona IRT Pro Am Racquetball in Tempe
  - Singles: (Canada) Kane Waselenchuk defeated (Mexico) Alejandro Landa, 15–4, 15–7.
  - Doubles: Not played.
- October 31 – November 3, 2019: Los Compadres Auto Sales Open in (California) Fullerton
  - Singles: (Mexico) Alejandro Landa defeated (United States) Rocky Carson, 9–15, 15–14, 11–10.
  - Doubles: (Mexico) Daniel de la Rosa & (Mexico) Álvaro Beltrán defeated (Bolivia) Carlos Keller Vargas & (Bolivia) Conrrado Moscoso, 15–12, 15–8.
- December 5–8, 2019: SPC John A. Pelham Memorial Tournament of Champions in (Oregon) Portland
  - Singles: (Canada) Kane Waselenchuk defeated (Mexico) Alejandro Landa, 15–7, 15–8.
  - Doubles: Not played.

=== Ladies Professional Racquetball Tour ===
- August 23–25, 2019: Paola Longoria Experience in (Mexico) San Luis Potosí
  - Singles: (Mexico) Paola Longoria defeated (Argentina) María José Vargas, 15–13, 15–6.
  - Doubles: (Mexico) Monserrat Mejía & (Mexico) Alexandra Herrera defeated (Mexico) Samantha Salas & (Mexico) Paola Longoria, 12–15, 15–10, 11–7.
- September 6–8, 2019: Chesapeake LPRT in Virginia Beach
  - Singles: (Argentina) María José Vargas defeated (Mexico) Paola Longoria, 7–15, 15–12, 11–4.
  - Doubles: (Mexico) Samantha Salas & (Mexico) Paola Longoria defeated (Argentina) Natalia Méndez & (Argentina) María José Vargas, 15–6, 15–11.
- October 2–6, 2019: US Open Racquetball Championships in (Minnesota) Minneapolis
  - Singles: (Mexico) Paola Longoria defeated (Argentina) María José Vargas, 15–5, 15–7.
  - Doubles: (Mexico) Monserrat Mejía & (Mexico) Alexandra Herrera defeated (Mexico) Samantha Salas & (Mexico) Paola Longoria, 15–13, 15–12.
- November 22–24, 2019: LPRT Pro Am Turkey Shoot in (Illinois) Lombard
  - Singles: (Mexico) Paola Longoria defeated (Mexico) Monserrat Mejía, 15–2, 15–6.
  - Doubles: (Mexico) Samantha Salas & (Mexico) Paola Longoria defeated (Mexico) Monserrat Mejía & (Mexico) Alexandra Herrera, 4–15, 15–10, 11–7.
- December 13–15, 2019: LPRT Christmas Classic Pro-AM in (Maryland) Laurel
  - Singles: (Mexico) Paola Longoria defeated (Argentina) María José Vargas, 3–15, 15–8, 11–8.
  - Doubles: (Mexico) Samantha Salas & (Mexico) Paola Longoria defeated (Argentina) Natalia Méndez & (Argentina) María José Vargas, 12–15, 15–11, 11–4.

== Roller sport ==
=== 2020 Summer Olympics (Skateboarding) ===
- March 16 – 22: World Skate Lima Open Street & Park - Tokyo 2020 Qualification Event SEASON #2 in (Peru) Lima
- April 6 – 12: ISO Yangcheng Street and Park 2020 - 5 STAR Tokyo 2020 Qualification Event SEASON #2 in (China) Yancheng
- April 14 – 19: ISO Nanjing Street 2020 - 5 STAR - Tokyo 2020 Qualification Event SEASON #2 in (China) Nanjing
- April 22 – 26: ARK League - Street - 5 STAR -Tokyo 2020 Qualification Event SEASON #2 in (Japan) Samukawa
- May 4 – 10: Dew Tour 2020 5 Star Street, Pro Tour Park - Tokyo 2020 Qualification Event SEASON #2 in (United States) Long Beach
- May 19 – 24: World Skate SLS World Championship 2020 - Tokyo 2020 Qualification Event SEASON #2 in (United Kingdom) London
- May 26 – 31: Park World Championship 2020 - Tokyo 2020 Qualification Event SEASON #2 in (China) Nanjing

=== World Skate Europe ===
- October 19, 2019 – May 17: 2019–20 Rink Hockey Euroleague
- October 26, 2019 – April 5: 2019–20 Rink Hockey European Female League
- October, 2019 – 2019–20 World Skate Europe Cup

=== FIRS ===
Artistic

- January 16 – 20: Americas Cup Championship of Clubs in (United States) Orlando
- May 4 – 10: Portugal Cup in Sines
- May 18 – 24: Sedmak Cup in (Italy) Trieste
- June 2 – 6: 2020 Artistic World Cup Final in (Germany) Bremerhaven
- June 6 – 14: Filippini International 2020 - World Skate 23rd edition in (Italy) Misano Adriatico

Inline freestyle

- August 27 – 30: Inline Freestyle World Championships in (China) Shanghai

Inline Hockey

- June 28 – July 11: 2020 FIRS Inline Hockey World Championships in (Colombia) Cartagena

Skate Cross

- August 27 – 30: Skate Cross World Championship in (China) Shanghai

Speed

- March 22: 2020 World Skate Lima Open Marathon in (Peru) Lima
- July 11 – 18: 2020 Inline Speed Skating World Championship in (Colombia) Cartagena & Arjona
- September 30 – October 10: 2020 Artistic Skating World Championships in (Paraguay) Asunción

=== Oceania Skate ===
- April 10 – 15: 2020 World Skate Oceania Speed Championships in (New Zealand) Timaru

== Rowing ==
=== 2020 Summer Olympics (Rowing) ===
- April 2 – 5: 2020 FISA Americas Olympic Qualification Regatta in (Brazil) Rio de Janeiro
- April 27 – 29: 2020 FISA European Olympic Qualification Regatta in (Italy) Varese
- April 27 – 30: 2020 FISA Asia & Oceania Olympic Qualification Regatta in (South Korea) Chungju
- May 17 – 19: 2020 FISA Final Olympic Qualification Regatta in (Switzerland) Lucerne

=== 2020 Summer Paralympics (Rowing) ===
- May 8 – 10: 2020 FISA Final Paralympic Qualification Regatta in (Italy) Gavirate

== Rugby league ==
- 2020 NRL season in Australasia
- Super League XXV in Europe
- June 19: 2020 Sunshine Coast Gympie Rugby League season is cancelled with only three top division clubs nominating teams.

== Rugby union ==
=== World Rugby ===
- September 27, 2019 – June 20: 2019–20 Pro14
- February 1 – March 14: 2020 Six Nations Championship
- February 2 – March 15: 2020 Women's Six Nations Championship

=== Rugby Europe ===
- November 15, 2019 – May 23: 2019–20 European Rugby Champions Cup
- November 15, 2019 – May 22: 2019–20 European Rugby Challenge Cup
- September, 2019 – June: 2019–20 Rugby Europe International Championships
  - October 26, 2019 – May 17: 2019–20 Rugby Europe Trophy
  - February 1 – March 16: 2020 Rugby Europe Championship
- March 1 – April 11: 2019–20 Rugby Europe Women Championship
- October 5, 2019 – 2020: 2019–20 Rugby Europe Women Trophy

=== Asia Rugby ===
- August 8 & 9: Asia Rugby Men's Sevens Trophy and Asia Rugby Women's Sevens Trophy in (Indonesia) Jakarta
- August 29 & 30: Asia Rugby Under 20 Men's Sevens and Asia Rugby Under 20 Women's Sevens in (Malaysia) Johor Bahru
- August 29 – September 27: 2020 Asia Rugby Sevens Series in (South Korea) Incheon, (China) Huizhou, (Sri Lanka) Colombo

=== Rugby Africa ===
- November 23, 2019 – 2019-20 Rugby Africa Cup

=== Americas Rugby ===
- August 15 – September 12: 2020 Americas Rugby Championship
- August 22 – 30: 2020 Americas Rugby Challenge

=== Rugby sevens ===
==== 2019–20 World Rugby Sevens Series ====
- December 5–7, 2019: 2019 Dubai Sevens in United Arab Emirates
  - Winner: South Africa; 2nd place: New Zealand; 3rd place: England
- December 13–15, 2019: 2019 South Africa Sevens in Cape Town
  - Winner: New Zealand; 2nd place: South Africa; 3rd place: France

==== 2019–20 World Rugby Women's Sevens Series ====
- October 5–6, 2019: 2019 USA Women's Sevens
  - Winner: United States; 2nd place: Australia; 3rd place: New Zealand
- December 5–7, 2019: 2019 Dubai Women's Sevens in United Arab Emirates
  - Winner: New Zealand; 2nd place: Canada; 3rd place: United States
- December 13–15, 2019: 2019 South Africa Women's Sevens in Cape Town
  - Winner: New Zealand; 2nd place: Australia; 3rd place: Canada

==== International rugby sevens events ====
- September 17 – 19: 2020 World University Rugby Sevens Championships in (Argentina) La Plata

== Shooting sports ==
=== 2020 Summer Olympics (Shooting) ===
- April 15 – 27: All Guns Olympic Test Event in (Japan) Tokyo

=== 2020 Summer Paralympics (Shooting) ===
- August 31 – September 6: Shooting at the 2020 Summer Paralympics in (Japan) Tokyo

=== World and continental shooting events ===
- February 23 – March 3: 2020 10m European Shooting Championships in (Poland) Wrocław
- May 6 – 20: 2020 European Shotgun Championships in (France) Châteauroux
- September 9 – 13: 2020 World University Shooting Championships in (Czech Republic) Plzeň

=== 2020 ISSF World Cup ===
- March 4 – 13: Shotgun World Cup #1 in (Cyprus) Nicosia
- March 15 – 26: All Guns World Cup #1 in (India) New Delhi
- June 2 – 9: Rifle and Pistol World Cup #1 in (Germany) Munich
- June 22 – July 3: All Guns World Cup #2 in (Azerbaijan) Baku

== Speed skating ==
=== 2020 Winter Youth Olympics (Speed skating) ===
- January 12 – 16: Speed skating at the 2020 Winter Youth Olympics in (Switzerland) St. Moritz
- January 18 – 22: Short track speed skating at the 2020 Winter Youth Olympics in (Switzerland) Lausanne

=== 2019–20 ISU Speed Skating World Cup ===
- November 15 – 17, 2019: SSWC #1 in (Belarus) Minsk
  - 500 m winners: (South Korea) Kim Jun-ho (m) / (Russia) Olga Fatkulina (f)
  - 1000 m winners: (Netherlands) Thomas Krol (m) / (United States) Brittany Bowe (f)
  - 1500 m winners: (Netherlands) Kjeld Nuis (m) / (Netherlands) Ireen Wüst (f)
  - Men's 5000 m winner: (Netherlands) Patrick Roest
  - Women's 3000 m winner: (Canada) Isabelle Weidemann
  - Mass Start winners: (Netherlands) Jorrit Bergsma (m) / (Canada) Ivanie Blondin (f)
  - Team sprint winners: Netherlands (Ronald Mulder, Kjeld Nuis, Kai Verbij) (m) / Netherlands (Michelle de Jong, Jutta Leerdam, Letitia de Jong)
- November 22 – 24, 2019: SSWC #2 in (Poland) Tomaszów Mazowiecki
  - 500 m winners: (Japan) Tatsuya Shinhama (m) / (Japan) Nao Kodaira (f)
  - 1500 m winners: (Netherlands) Thomas Krol (m) / (Netherlands) Ireen Wüst (f)
  - Men's 5000 m winner: (Netherlands) Patrick Roest
  - Women's 3000 m winner: (Czech Republic) Martina Sáblíková
  - Mass Start winners: (United States) Joey Mantia (m) / (Netherlands) Irene Schouten (f)
  - Team Pursuit winners: Netherlands (Douwe de Vries, Jan Blokhuijsen, Patrick Roest, Marcel Bosker) / Russia (Yekaterina Shikhova, Natalya Voronina, Elizaveta Kazelina, Evgeniia Lalenkova)
  - Team sprint winners: Netherlands (Ronald Mulder, Kjeld Nuis, Thomas Krol, Lennart Velema) / Russia (Olga Fatkulina, Angelina Golikova, Daria Kachanova, Irina Kuznetsova)
- December 6 – 8, 2019: SSWC #3 in (Kazakhstan) Nur-Sultan
  - 500 m winners: (Russia) Viktor Mushtakov (m) / (Russia) Angelina Golikova (f)
  - 1000 m winners: (Netherlands) Thomas Krol (m) / (United States) Brittany Bowe (f)
  - 1500 m winners: (China) Zhongyan Ning (m) / (Canada) Ivanie Blondin (f)
  - Men's 10000 m winner: (Netherlands) Patrick Roest
  - Women's 5000 m winner: (Canada) Ivanie Blondin
  - Team Pursuit winners: Italy (Andrea Giovannini, Nicola Tumolero, Michele Malfatti, Alessio Trentini) / Canada (Ivanie Blondin, Isabelle Weidemann, Béatrice Lamarche, Valérie Maltais)
  - Team sprint winners: Netherlands (Ronald Mulder, Kjeld Nuis, Kai Verbij, Thomas Krol) (m) / Netherlands (Letitia de Jong, Sanneke de Neeling, Jutta Leerdam, Michelle de Jong)
- December 13 – 15, 2019: SSWC #4 in Nagano
  - 1st 500 m winners: (Japan) Yuma Murakami (m) / (Japan) Nao Kodaira (f)
  - 2nd 500 m winners: (Russia) Viktor Mushtakov (m) / (Russia) Angelina Golikova (f)
  - 1000 m winners: (Russia) Pavel Kulizhnikov (m) / (United States) Brittany Bowe (f)
  - Men's 5000 m winner: (Russia) Danila Semerikov
  - Women's 3000 m winner: (Canada) Ivanie Blondin
  - Mass Start winners: (Canada) Jordan Belchos (m) / (Canada) Ivanie Blondin (f)
  - Team Pursuit winners: Russia (Aleksandr Rumyantsev, Danila Semerikov, Ruslan Zakharov, Daniil Aldoshkin) / Japan (Miho Takagi, Nana Takagi, Ayano Sato, Nene Sakai)
  - Team sprint winners: Russia (Pavel Kulizhnikov, Ruslan Murashov, Viktor Mushtakov, Artem Arefyev) (m) / Netherlands (Sanneke de Neeling, Dione Voskamp, Isabelle van Elst, Michelle de Jong)
- February 7 & 8: SSWC #5 in (Canada) Calgary
- March 7 & 8: SSWC #6 (final) in (Netherlands) Heerenveen

=== Other long track speed skating events ===
- January 10 – 12: 2020 European Speed Skating Championships in (Netherlands) Heerenveen
- January 31 – February 2: 2020 Four Continents Speed Skating Championships in (United States) Milwaukee (debut event)
- February 13 – 16: 2020 World Single Distance Speed Skating Championships in (United States) Salt Lake City
- February 28 – March 1: 2020 World Sprint & World Allround Speed Skating Championships in (Norway) Hamar
- March 10 – 13: 2020 World University Speed Skating Championships in (Netherlands) Amsterdam

=== 2019–20 ISU Short Track Speed Skating World Cup ===
- November 1 – 3, 2019: STWC #1 in (United States) Salt Lake City
  - Men's 500 m winners: (South Korea) Hwang Dae-heon (#1) / (China) Wu Dajing (#2)
  - Women's 500 m winners: (Italy) Martina Valcepina (#1) / (Canada) Kim Boutin (#2)
  - 1000 m winners: (South Korea) Hwang Dae-heon (m) / (Netherlands) Suzanne Schulting
  - 1500 m winners: (Russia) Semion Elistratov (m) / (Canada) Kim Boutin (f)
  - Men's 5000 m Relay winners: Russia (Daniil Eybog, Pavel Sitnikov, Semion Elistratov, & Viktor An)
  - Women's 3000 m Relay winners: China (Fan Kexin, Han Yutong, Qu Chunyu, & ZHANG Yuting)
  - Mixed 2000 m Relay winners: Russia (Daniil Eybog, Ekaterina Efremenkova, Sofia Prosvirnova, & Viktor An)
- November 8 – 10, 2019: STWC #2 in (Canada) Montreal
  - 500 m winners: (Hungary) Shaolin Sándor Liu (m) / (Canada) Kim Boutin (f)
  - Men's 1000 m winners: (South Korea) Hwang Dae-heon (#1) / (Russia) Semion Elistratov (#2)
  - Women's 1000 m winners: (Canada) Kim Boutin (#1) / (China) Han Yutong (#2)
  - 1500 m winners: (South Korea) Park Ji-won (m) / (South Korea) KIM Ji-yoo (f)
  - Men's 5000 m Relay winners: Hungary (Csaba Burján, Cole Krueger, Shaoang Liu, & Shaolin Sándor Liu)
  - Women's 3000 m Relay winners: China (Fan Kexin, Qu Chunyu, ZANG Yize, & ZHANG Yuting)
  - Mixed 2000 m Relay winners: China (Han Tianyu, Qu Chunyu, Ren Ziwei, & ZHANG Yuting)
- November 29 – December 1, 2019: STWC #3 in (Japan) Nagoya
  - 500 m winners: (Hungary) Shaoang Liu (m) / (Canada) Kim Boutin (f)
  - 1000 m winners: (South Korea) Park Ji-won (m) / (South Korea) Noh Ah-reum (f)
  - 1st 1500 m winners: (South Korea) Kim Dong-wook (m) / (South Korea) Kim Ji-yoo (f)
  - 2nd 1500 m winners: (South Korea) Park Ji-won (m) / (Netherlands) Suzanne Schulting (f)
  - Men's 5000 m Relay winners: China (AN Kai, Han Tianyu, Ren Ziwei, Wu Dajing)
  - Women's 3000 m Relay winners: Italy (Arianna Fontana, Cynthia Mascitto, Martina Valcepina, Nicole Botter Gomez)
  - Mixed 2000 m Relay winners: South Korea (Choi Min-jeong, Kim A-lang, Kim Dong-wook, Park In-wook)
- December 6 – 8, 2019: STWC #4 in (China) Shanghai
  - 1st 500 m winners: (Hungary) Shaolin Sándor Liu (m) / (Canada) Kim Boutin (f)
  - 2nd 500 m winners: (Hungary) Shaolin Sándor Liu (m) / (China) Fan Kexin (f)
  - 1000 m winners: (China) Han Tianyu (m) / (Netherlands) Suzanne Schulting (f)
  - 1500 m winners: (South Korea) Lee June-seo (m) / (South Korea) Kim A-lang (f)
  - Men's 5000 m Relay winners: Russia (Daniil Eybog, Pavel Sitnikov, Semion Elistratov, Viktor An)
  - Women's 3000 m Relay winners: Canada (Alyson Charles, Courtney Sarault, Danaé Blais, Kim Boutin)
  - Mixed 2000 m Relay winners: Netherlands (Daan Breeuwsma, Itzhak de Laat, Lara van Ruijven, Suzanne Schulting)
- February 7 – 9: STWC #5 in (Germany) Dresden
- February 14 – 16: STWC #6 (final) in (Netherlands) Dordrecht

=== Other short track speed skating events ===
- January 10 – 12: 2020 Four Continents Short Track Speed Skating Championships in (Canada) Montreal (debut event)
- January 24 – 26: 2020 European Short Track Speed Skating Championships in (Hungary) Debrecen
- March 13 – 15: 2020 World Short Track Speed Skating Championships in (South Korea) Seoul

== Sport climbing ==
=== International sport climbing championships ===
- TBA: 2020 World University Sport Climbing Championships in (Italy) Turin

== Squash ==
=== 2019–20 PSA World Tour ===
World Tour Platinum

- October 5–12, 2019: United States Open in Philadelphia
  - Men: (Egypt) Ali Farag defeated (Egypt) Mohamed El Shorbagy, 11–4, 11–7, 11–2.
  - Women: (Egypt) Nouran Gohar defeated (Egypt) Nour El Tayeb, 3–11, 8–11, 14–12, 11–8, 11–7.
- October 25 – November 1, 2019: Egyptian Squash Open in (Egypt) Cairo
  - (Egypt) Karim Abdel Gawad defeated (Egypt) Ali Farag, 11–6, 11–8, 11–8.
- January 9 – 17: Tournament of Champions in (United States) Manhattan

World Tour Gold

- September 4–8, 2019: China Squash Open in Shanghai
  - Men: (Egypt) Mohamed El Shorbagy defeated (Egypt) Ali Farag, 11–3, 11–9, 5–11, 11–8.
  - Women: (Egypt) Nour El Tayeb defeated (Egypt) Raneem El Weleily, 11–9, 9–11, 11–9, 9–11, 12–10.
- September 24–30, 2019: Netsuite Open in (United States) San Francisco
  - Men: (Egypt) Mohamed El Shorbagy defeated (Egypt) Tarek Momen, 11–5, 11–13, 11–9, 7–11, 11–4.
  - Women: (Egypt) Raneem El Weleily defeated (Egypt) Nour El Tayeb, 11–5, 11–5, 11–5.
- November 19–24, 2019: St George's Hill Open in (England) Weybridge
  - (Egypt) Karim Abdel Gawad defeated (Egypt) Mohamed El Shorbagy, 8–11, 11–3, 11–1, 10–12, 11–6.

World Tour Silver

- September 9–14, 2019: Open de France - Nantes in France
  - Men: (New Zealand) Paul Coll defeated (Wales) Joel Makin, 12–10, 11–3, 11–9.
  - Women: (France) Camille Serme defeated (United States) Amanda Sobhy, 9–11, 11–6, 11–8, 11–9.

World Tour Bronze

- January 22 – 26: Pittsburgh Open in (United States) Pittsburgh
- January 22 – 27: Carol Weymuller Open in (United States) Brooklyn
- January 30 – February 3: Cleveland Classic in (United States) Cleveland

World Championship

- October 24 – November 1, 2019: CIB PSA Women's World Championship in (Egypt) Cairo
  - (Egypt) Nour El Sherbini defeated (Egypt) Raneem El Weleily, 11–4, 9–11, 11–5, 11–6.
- November 8–15, 2019: PSA Men's World Championship in (Qatar) Doha
  - (Egypt) Tarek Momen defeated (New Zealand) Paul Coll, 11–8, 11–3, 11–4.

== Table tennis ==
=== 2020 Summer Olympics (Table tennis) ===
- April 6 – 12: Asian 2020 Olympic Qualification Tournament (location TBA)
- TBA: Latin American Singles and Mixed Qualification to Tokyo 2020 in (Cuba) Havana

=== World table tennis events ===
Senior

- November 8 – 10: 2020 ITTF Women's World Cup in (China) Weihai
- November 13 – 15: 2020 ITTF Men's World Cup in (China) Weihai
- November 19 – 22: 2020 ITTF Finals in (China) Zhengzhou
- February 28 – March 7, 2021: 2020 World Team Table Tennis Championships in (South Korea) Busan

Junior & Cadet

- November 29 – December 6: 2020 World Junior Table Tennis Championships in (Portugal) Guimarães

=== Continental table tennis championships ===
==== Americas (TT) ====
Senior

- February 7 – 9: 2020 ITTF Pan-America Cup (location TBA)
- September 15 – 20: 2020 Pan American Table Tennis Championships (location TBA)

Junior & Cadet

- June 22 – 27: 2020 Pan American Junior Table Tennis Championships (location TBA)

==== Asia (TT) ====
Senior

- TBA: 2020 ITTF-ATTU Asian Cup (location TBA)

Junior & Cadet

- September 29 – October 4: 2020 Asian Junior & Cadet Table Tennis Championships (location TBA)

==== Europe (TT) ====
Senior

- February 8 & 9: 2020 Europe Top 16 Cup in (Switzerland) Montreux
- September 15 – 20: 2020 European Table Tennis Championships in (Poland) Warsaw

U-21, Junior & Cadet

- March 4 – 8: 2020 European Under-21 Table Tennis Championships in (Croatia) Varaždin
- July 10 – 19: 2020 European Youth Table Tennis Championships in (Croatia) Zagreb
- October 2 – 4: 2020 European Youth Top 10 in (Germany) Berlin

=== 2020 ITTF World Tour ===
World Tour Platinum events

- January 28 – February 2: 2020 German Open in (Germany) Magdeburg
- March 3 – 8: 2020 Qatar Open in Doha
- April 21 – 26: 2020 Japan Open in Kitakyushu
- May 12 – 17: 2020 China Open in Shenzhen
- June 23 – 28: 2020 Australian Open in (Australia) Geelong
- November 10 – 15: 2020 Austrian Open in (Austria) Linz

World Tour events

- February 18 – 23: 2020 Hungarian Open in (Hungary) Budapest
- May 5 – 10: 2020 Hong Kong Open in Hong Kong
- June 16 – 21: 2020 Korea Open (location TBA)
- August 25 – 30: 2020 Czech Open in (Czech Republic) Olomouc
- September 1 – 6: 2020 Bulgarian Open in (Bulgaria) Panagyurishte
- November 3 – 8: 2020 Swedish Open in (Sweden) Stockholm

Grand Finals

- December 10 – 13: 2020 ITTF World Tour Grand Finals (location TBA)

=== 2020 ITTF Challenge Series ===
Plus events

- February 12 – 16: Portugal Open in Lisbon
- March 11 – 15: Oman Open in Muscat
- June 3 – 7: Belarus Open in Minsk
- August 18 – 22: Nigeria Open in Lagos
- September 9 – 13: Pyongyang Open in North Korea
- October 27 – 31: Belgian Open in (Belgium) De Haan
- December 1 – 5: Canada Open in Vancouver

Regular events

- February 4 – 8: Spanish Open in (Spain) Guadalajara
- March 11 – 15: Polish Open in (Poland) Gliwice
- April 1 – 5: Italian Open in (Italy) Riccione
- April 22 – 26: Slovenia Open in Otočec
- April 28 – May 2: Croatia Open in Zagreb
- April 29 – May 3: Thailand Open in Bangkok
- June 9 – 13: Mexico Open in Cancún

== Tennis ==
=== Grand Slam ===
- January 13–26: 2020 Australian Open
  - Men: (Serbia) Novak Djokovic defeated (Austria) Dominic Thiem, 6–4, 4–6, 2–6, 6–3, 6–4.
  - Women: (United States) Sofia Kenin defeated (Spain) Garbiñe Muguruza, 4–6, 6–2, 6–2.
- August 31–September 13: 2020 US Open
- September 21–October 11: 2020 French Open
- 2020 Wimbledon Championships cancelled, and instead to be held the tournament in 2021.

=== 2020 WTA Tour ===
WTA Premier

WTA International

== Triathlon ==
=== 2020 Summer Olympics (Triathlon) ===
- May 9 & 10: 2020 Chengdu ITU Mixed Relay Olympic Qualification Event in China

=== 2020 ITU World Triathlon Series ===
- March 6 & 7: WTS #1 in (United Arab Emirates) Abu Dhabi
- April 18 & 19: WTS #2 in Bermuda
- May 16 & 17: WTS #3 in (Japan) Yokohama
- June 6 & 7: WTS #4 in (United Kingdom) Leeds
- June 27 & 28: WTS #5 in (Canada) Montreal
- July 11 & 12: WTS #6 in (Germany) Hamburg
- August 20 – 23: WTS Grand Final (#7) in (Canada) Edmonton

=== World triathlon championships ===
- May 2 & 3: 2020 Milan ITU Paratriathlon World Championships in Italy
- June 27 & 28: 2020 Kecskemét World University Triathlon Championships in Hungary
- July 11 & 12: 2020 Hamburg ITU Triathlon Mixed Relay World Championships in Germany
- September 4 – 13: 2020 Almere-Amsterdam ITU Multisport World Championships in the Netherlands

=== 2020 ITU Triathlon World Cup ===
- March 14 & 15: TWC #1 in (Australia) Mooloolaba
- March 21 & 22: TWC #2 in (United States) Sarasota
- March 28 & 29: TWC #3 in (New Zealand) New Plymouth
- April 4 & 5: TWC #4 in (Brazil) Brasília
- April 25 & 26: TWC #5 in (Mexico) Huatulco
- May 1 & 2: TWC #6 in (Spain) Valencia
- May 9 & 10: TWC #7 in (China) Chengdu
- May 30 & 31: TWC #8 in (Italy) Arzachena
- July 18 & 19: TWC #9 in (Hungary) Tiszaújváros
- August 29 & 30: TWC #10 in (Czech Republic) Karlovy Vary
- September 12 & 13: TWC #11 in (China) Weihai
- September 25 & 26: TWC #12 in (Spain) Madrid
- October 17 & 18: TWC #13 in (South Korea) Tongyeong
- October 24 & 25: TWC #14 in (Japan) Miyazaki

=== 2020 ITU World Triathlon Mixed Relay Series ===
- March 6 & 7: WTMRS #1 in (United Arab Emirates) Abu Dhabi

=== 2020 ITU World Paratriathlon Series ===
- February 29 & March 1: WPS #1 in (Australia) Devonport
- May 16 & 17: WPS #2 in (Japan) Yokohama
- June 20 & 21: WPS #3 (final) in (Canada) Montreal

=== 2020 ITU Paratriathlon World Cup ===
- March 7 & 8: PWC #1 in (United Arab Emirates) Abu Dhabi
- March 21 & 22: PWC #2 in (United States) Sarasota
- June 13 & 14: PWC #3 in (France) Besançon
- October 3 & 4: PWC #4 in (Turkey) Alanya

=== World Triathlon Corporation ===
Main Ironman Championships

- March 29: 2020 Ironman African Championship in (South Africa) Nelson Mandela Bay Metropolitan Municipality
- June 7: 2020 Ironman Asia-Pacific Championship in (Australia) Cairns
- June 28: 2020 Ironman European Championship in (Germany) Frankfurt
- TBA: 2020 Ironman North American Championship in (United States) The Woodlands
- TBA: 2020 Ironman South American Championship in (Argentina) Mar del Plata
- TBA: 2020 Ironman World Championship in (United States) Kailua-Kona

Main Ironman 70.3 Championships

- June 21: 2020 Ironman 70.3 European Championship in (Denmark) Elsinore
- November 28: 2020 Ironman 70.3 World Championship in (New Zealand) Taupō
- TBA: 2020 Ironman 70.3 South American Championship (location TBA)
- TBA: 2020 Ironman 70.3 North American Championship (location TBA)
- TBA: 2020 Ironman 70.3 Asia-Pacific Championship (location TBA)
- TBA: 2020 Ironman 70.3 Middle East Championship (location TBA)

== Volleyball ==
=== 2020 Summer Olympics (Volleyball) ===
- April 21 – 26: 2020 Olympic Volleyball Test Events in (Japan) Tokyo

=== FIVB Challenger Cup ===
- June 24 – 28: 2020 FIVB Volleyball Challenger Cup for Men and Women in (Portugal) Gondomar

=== FIVB Nations League ===
- May 19 – June 18: 2020 FIVB Volleyball Women's Nations League
- May 22 – June 21: 2020 FIVB Volleyball Men's Nations League

=== NORCECA ===
- January 10 – 12: 2020 NORCECA Men's Tokyo Volleyball Olympic Qualification in (Canada) Vancouver
- January 10 – 12: 2020 NORCECA Women's Tokyo Volleyball Olympic Qualification in (Dominican Republic) Santo Domingo

=== CSV ===
- January 7 – 9: 2020 CSV Women's Tokyo Volleyball Olympic Qualification in (Colombia) Bogotá
- January 10 – 12: 2020 CSV Men's Tokyo Volleyball Olympic Qualification in (Chile) Santiago

=== CEV ===
Teams competitions

- January 5 – 10: 2020 CEV Men's Tokyo Volleyball Olympic Qualification in (Germany) Berlin
- January 7 – 12: 2020 CEV Women's Tokyo Volleyball Olympic Qualification in (Netherlands) Apeldoorn
- May 23 – June 21: 2020 CEV Men's Volleyball European Golden League (Final in (Belgium) Kortrijk)
- May 23 – June 21: 2020 CEV Women's Volleyball European Golden League (Final in (Bulgaria) Ruse)

Club competitions

- October 8, 2019 – May 17: 2019–20 CEV Women's Champions League
- October 22, 2019 – May 17: 2019–20 CEV Champions League

Other competitions

- October 2, 2019 – March 14: 2019–20 Baltic Men Volleyball League
- October 12, 2019 –: 2019–20 Baltic Women Volleyball League
- October 5, 2019 –: 2019–20 MEVZA League
- October 12, 2019 –: 2019–20 MEVZA Women League

=== AVC ===
- January 7 – 12: 2020 AVC Men's Tokyo Volleyball Olympic Qualification in (China) Jiangmen
- January 7 – 12: 2020 AVC Women's Tokyo Volleyball Olympic Qualification in (Thailand) Nakhon Ratchasima

=== CAVB ===
- January 4 – 9: 2020 CAVB Women's Tokyo Volleyball Olympic Qualification in (Cameroon) Yaoundé
- January 6 – 12: 2020 CAVB Men's Tokyo Volleyball Olympic Qualification in (Egypt) Cairo

== Water polo ==
- March 22 – 29: 2020 Men's Water Polo Olympic Games Qualification Tournament in (Netherlands) Rotterdam

== Water skiing & Wakeboarding ==
=== IWWF World Championships ===
- March 21 & 22: 2020 IWWF World Waterski Show Tournament in (Australia) Mulwala
- April 11 – 18: 2020 IWWF World Barefoot Waterski Championships in (Australia) Liverpool (Sydney)
- August 18 – 23: 2020 IWWF World Junior Waterski Championships in (United States) Santa Rosa Beach, Florida
- September 14 – 20: 2020 IWWF World Cable Wakeboard Championships in (Thailand) Pathum Thani
- September 14 – 20: 2020 IWWF World Over 35 Waterski Championships in (France) Baurech
- September 22 – 27: 2020 FISU World University Waterski & Wakeboard Championships in (Ukraine) Dnipro

== Wrestling ==
=== 2020 Wrestling Continental Championships ===
- 2020 Individual Wrestling World Cup in (Serbia) Belgrade ⇒ 12–18 December
- 2020 European Wrestling Championships in (Italy) Rome ⇒ 10–16 February
- 2020 Asian Wrestling Championships in (India) New Delhi ⇒ 18–23 February
- 2020 Pan American Wrestling Championships in (Canada) Ottawa ⇒ 6–9 March
- 2020 African Wrestling Championships in (Algeria) Algiers ⇒ 8–9 February
- 2020 Pan American Wrestling Olympic Qualification Tournament in (Canada) Ottawa ⇒ 13–15 March

=== 2020 Wrestling International Tournament ===
- 2020 Yasar Dogu Tournament in (Turkey) Istanbul ⇒ 10–12 January
- Golden Grand Prix Ivan Yarygin 2020 in (Russia) Krasnoyarsk ⇒ 23–26 January
- 2020 Grand Prix Zagreb Open in (Croatia) Zagreb ⇒ 7–8 November
- 2020 Wladyslaw Pytlasinski Cup in (Poland) Warsaw ⇒ 7–8 November

== Notes ==
- ^1 Season cancelled due to the COVID-19 pandemic.
