= Tekovský Hrádok =

Tekovský Hrádok Barsvárad
- Municipality
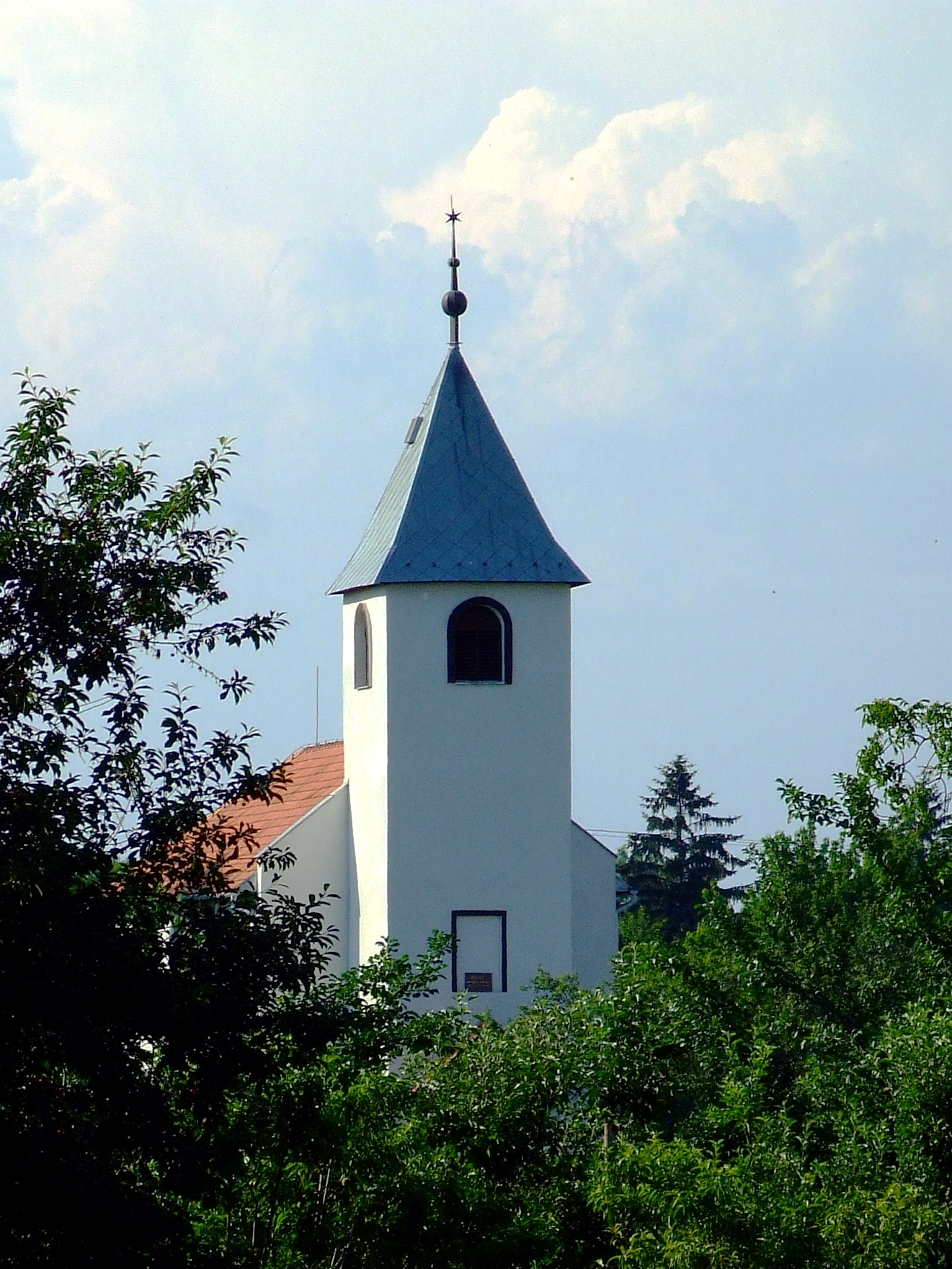

- Flag

- Location of Tekovský Hrádok in the Nitra Region Location of Tekovský Hrádok in Slovakia
- Coordinates: 48.17°N 18.55°E
- Country: Slovakia
- Region: Nitra Region
- District: Levice District
- First mentioned: 1232

Government
  - Mayor: Vojtech Ožvald

Area
  - Total: 7.31 km^{2} (2.82 sq mi)
- Elevation: 155 m (509 ft)

Population (2025)
  - Total: 369
- Time zone: UTC+1 (CET)
  - Summer (DST): UTC+2 (CEST)
- Postal code: 935 51
- Area code: +421 36
- Vehicle registration plate (until 2022): LV
- Website: www.tekovskyhradok.sk

Tekovský Hrádok (Hungarian: Barsvárad) is a village and municipality in the Levice District in the Nitra Region of Slovakia.

== History ==
In historical records the village was first mentioned in 1232.

== Geography ==
The municipality lies at an altitude of 155 metres (509 ft) and covers an area of 7.31 km^{2} (2.82 sq mi) (2025).

== Population ==
Population statistic (10 years)
Year	1995	2005	2015	2025
Count	318	334	355	369
Difference		+5.03%	+6.28%	+3.94%

Population statistic
Year	2024	2025
Count	370	369
Difference		−0.27%

It has a population of 369 people (31 December 2025).

=== Ethnicity ===
Census 2021 (1+ %)
Ethnicity	Number	Fraction
Slovak	260	68.42%
Hungarian	128	33.68%
Not found out	9	2.36%
Rusyn	4	1.05%
Total	380	

In year 2021 was 380 people by ethnicity 260 as Slovak, 128 as Hungarian, 9 as Not found out, 4 as Rusyn, 1 as Czech and 1 as Russian.

Note on population: The difference values of population numbers in the table "Population statistic" and in the sections "Ethnicity" & "Religion" is caused by the use of various statistical methods.

=== Religion ===
Census 2021 (1+ %)
Religion	Number	Fraction
None	138	36.32%
Roman Catholic Church	125	32.89%
Calvinist Church	85	22.37%
Evangelical Church	17	4.47%
Not found out	7	1.84%
Total	380	

In year 2021 was 380 people by religion 138 from None, 125 from Roman Catholic Church, 85 from Calvinist Church, 17 from Evangelical Church, 7 from Not found out, 2 from Old Catholic Church, 2 from Greek Catholic Church, 2 from Buddhism, 1 from Jehovah's Witnesses and 1 from Ad hoc movements.

== Facilities ==
The village has a public library.
