= Bunge Championship =

Manitoba men's provincial curling championship

- Established: 1925; 101 years ago
- 2026 host city: Selkirk, Manitoba
- 2026 arena: Selkirk Recreation Complex
- 2026 champion: Braden Calvert

Current edition
- 2026 Bunge Championship

The Bunge Championship is the Manitoba men's provincial curling championship. The tournament is run by Curl Manitoba, the provincial curling association. The winner represents Manitoba at the Montana's Brier, the Canadian men's championship.

The tournament was previously known as the Viterra Championship (2016–2025), Safeway Championship (2008–2015), Safeway Select (1995–2007); the Labatt Tankard (1980–1994); the British Consols (1937–1979) and the Macdonald Brier Trophy event winner at the MCA Bonspiel (1925-1936).

== Qualification ==
Until 2025, 32 teams qualified for the championship. Starting with the 2026 edition, the number of qualifying berths will be reduced to 24. The distribution of berths changes from year to year but is generally composed of the following:

- Winners of Regional Zone Playdowns
- Winners of a "Berth Bonspiel"
- Brandon Men's Bonspiel winner
- Defending champion
- Manitoba Curling Tour champion
- Top team(s) from the Manitoba Curling Tour Rankings
- Top Manitoba team(s) on the CTRS rankings
- Top teams from the Manitoba Curling Association Bonspiel

== Winners ==
Listed below are the provincial champion skips for each year. Manitoba did not participate in the 1927 Brier. Brier champions in bold.

Year	Team	Winning Club	Host city	Host Venue
1925	Howard Wood, Sr., John Erzinger, Vic Wood, Lionel Wood	Granite Curling Club	Winnipeg	
1926	George Sherwood, Charlie Edge, Lionel Tinling, Rod Vincent	St. John's Curling Club	Winnipeg	
1927	Jim Congalton, Jack Campbell, Bill Noble, Bill Sharman	Granite Curling Club	Winnipeg	
1928	**Gordon Hudson, Sam Penwarden, Ron Singbush, Bill Grant**	Strathcona Curling Club	Winnipeg	
1929	**Gordon Hudson, Don Rollo, Ron Singbush, Bill Grant**	Strathcona Curling Club	Winnipeg	
1930	**Howard Wood, Sr., Jim Congalton, Vic Wood, Lionel Wood**	Granite Curling Club	Winnipeg	
1931	**Bob Gourley, Ernie Pollard, Arnold Lockerbie, Ray Stewart**	Strathcona Curling Club	Winnipeg	
1932	**Jim Congalton, Jack Campbell, Bill Noble, Harry Mawhinney**	Granite Curling Club	Winnipeg	
1933	John Douglas, Jimmy Welsh, Alex Welsh, Jock Reid	Deer Lodge Curling Club	Winnipeg	
1934	**Leo Johnson, Lorne Stewart, Lincoln Johnson, Marno Frederickson**	Strathcona Curling Club	Winnipeg	
1935	Roy Pritchard, George Ellis, Arthur Boyce, Mark Teskey	Killarney Curling Club	Winnipeg	
1936	**Ken Watson, Grant Watson, Marvin Macintyre, Charles Kerr**	Strathcona Curling Club	Winnipeg	
1937	Jimmy Welsh, Fred Smith, Jock Reid, Harry Monk	Deer Lodge Curling Club	Winnipeg	
1938	**Ab Gowanlock, Bung Cartmell, Bill McKnight, Tom McKnight**	Glenboro Curling Club	Winnipeg	Winnipeg Amphitheatre
1939	Ross Kennedy, William MacDonald, Robert Hume, Clair Wells	Strathcona Curling Club	Winnipeg	
1940	**Howard Wood, Sr., Ernie Pollard, Howie Wood Jr., Roy Enman**	Granite Curling Club	Winnipeg	
1941	Al Wakefield, Doug Adams, Lionel Francis, Winston Anders	Strathcona Curling Club	Winnipeg	
1942	**Ken Watson, Grant Watson, Charles Scrymgeour, Jimmy Grant**	Strathcona Curling Club	Winnipeg	
1943	Ken Watson, Grant Watson, Lyle Dyker, Charles Scrymgeour	Strathcona Curling Club	Winnipeg	
1944	Leo Johnson, Harry Weremy, Bob Noble, Jack Price	Strathcona Curling Club	Winnipeg	
1945	Howard Wood, Sr., Al Derrett, Verne Handford, Lionel Wood	Granite Curling Club	Winnipeg	
1946	Leo Johnson, Harry Weremy, Lincoln Johnson, Bill McKnight	Strathcona Curling Club	Winnipeg	
1947	**Jimmy Welsh, Alex Welsh, Jock Reid, Harry Monk**	Deer Lodge Curling Club	Winnipeg	Winnipeg Amphitheatre
1948	George Sangster, Bill Sangster, Bill Petrie (3 player team)	Granite Curling Club	Winnipeg	
1949	**Ken Watson, Grant Watson, Lyle Dyker, Charles Read**	Strathcona Curling Club	Winnipeg	
1950	Bill McTavish, Norm Hume, Gord Lilyman, Ken Conn	Elmwood Curling Club	Winnipeg	Winnipeg Amphitheatre
1951	Roy Forsyth, Lorne Stewart, Allister McDiarmid, Arthur Meers	Strathcona Curling Club	Winnipeg	
1952	**Billy Walsh, Al Langlois, Andy McWilliams, John Watson**	Fort Rouge Curling Club	Winnipeg	
1953	**Ab Gowanlock, Jim Williams, Art Pollon, Russ Jackman**	Dauphin Curling Club	Winnipeg	
1954	Jimmy Welsh, Alex Welsh, Jock Reid, Harry Monk	Deer Lodge Curling Club	Winnipeg	Winnipeg Amphitheatre
1955	Roy Forsyth, Donald Lord, Frank Muirhead, Dave Reid	Strathcona Curling Club	Winnipeg	
1956	**Billy Walsh, Al Langlois, Cy White, Andy McWilliams**	Fort Rouge Curling Club	Winnipeg	Winnipeg Arena
1957	Howard Wood, Jr., Bill Sharpe, Don Duguid, Lorne Duguid	Granite Curling Club	Winnipeg	Winnipeg Arena
1958	Terry Braunstein, Ron Braunstein, Ray Turnbull, Jack Van Hellemond	Granite Curling Club	Winnipeg	
1959	Richard Bird, Ed Tipping Jr., Gunnar Neilson, Bill Evans	Elmwood Curling Club	Winnipeg	
1960	Mac Scales, George Laudrum, John McCorrister, Lloyd Goodman	Strathcona Curling Club	Winnipeg	Winnipeg Arena
1961	John-David Lyon, Leroy Herman, Leo Kelsch, Bill Zaporzan	West Kildonan Curling Club	Winnipeg	Winnipeg Arena
1962	Norm Houck, Jim Ursel, Morley Handford, Ross Murdoch	Strathcona Curling Club	Winnipeg	
1963	Hersh Lerner, Cole Staniloff, Bob Lemecha, Al Dudar	Maple Leaf Curling Club	Winnipeg	
1964	Bruce Hudson, Harvey Mazinke, Ken Little, Harry Martel	Strathcona Curling Club	Winnipeg	
1965	**Terry Braunstein, Don Duguid, Ron Braunstein, Ray Turnbull**	Granite Curling Club	Winnipeg	
1966	Hersh Lerner, Bob Lemecha, Al Dudar, Bob Dudar	Maple Leaf Curling Club	Dauphin	
1967	Bruce Hudson, Dick Wright, Ken Little, Harry Martel	Strathcona Curling Club	Winnipeg	
1968	Burke Parker, Lloyd Yerama, Roy Berry, Jack Yuill	Dauphin Curling Club	Brandon	
1969	Bob Robinson, Al Shinfield, Len Easton, Doug Strange	Maple Leaf Curling Club	Winnipeg	
1970	**Don Duguid, Rod Hunter, Jim Pettapiece, Bryan Wood**	Granite Curling Club	Dauphin	
1971	**Don Duguid, Rod Hunter, Jim Pettapiece, Bryan Wood**	Granite Curling Club	Winnipeg	
1972	**Orest Meleschuk, Dave Romano, John Hanesiak, Pat Hailley**	Fort Rouge Curling Club	Virden	
1973	Danny Fink, Rod Hunter, Jim Pettapiece, John Hunter	Granite Curling Club	Winnipeg	
1974	Don Barr, Danny Hyrich, Jack Fraser, Jim Thornborough	Glenboro Curling Club	Winnipeg	
1975	Rod Hunter, Mike Riley, Doug Holmes, Bryan Wood	Granite Curling Club	Brandon	
1976	Clare DeBlonde, Garry DeBlonde, Don Finkbeiner, Doug Finkbeiner	Heather Curling Club	Flin Flon	
1977	John Usackis, Dave Romano, Ed Thomson, Bob Collez	Lac du Bonnet Curling Club	Winnipeg	
1978	Doug Harrison, Jim Sampson, Rick Hoffman, Bryan Wood	Heather Curling Club	Brandon	
1979	**Barry Fry, Bill Carey, Gord Sparkes, Bryan Wood**	Deer Lodge Curling Club	Winnipeg	Winnipeg Arena
1980	Earle Morris, Clare DeBlonde, Garry DeBlonde, Winston Warren	CFB Winnipeg Curling Club	Winnipeg	Winnipeg Arena
1981	**Kerry Burtnyk, Mark Olson, Jim Spencer, Ron Kammerlock**	Assiniboine Memorial Curling Club	Brandon	Keystone Centre
1982	Mel Logan, Doug Armour, Lloyd Lang, Al Granger	Souris Curling Club	Winnipeg	Winnipeg Arena
1983	Lloyd Gunnlaugson, Bob Davidson, Gord Paterson, Harold Johannesson	Valour Road Curling Club	Winnipeg	Winnipeg Arena
1984	**Mike Riley, Brian Toews, John Helston, Russ Wookey**	Pembina Curling Club	Virden	Virden Arena
1985	John Bubbs, Dave Iverson, Cliff Lenz, Dan Hildebrand	Wildewood Curling Club	Dauphin	Dauphin Arena
1986	Mike Riley, Brian Toews, Russ Wookey, Terry Henry	Pembina Curling Club	Winnipeg	Winnipeg Arena
1987	Brian Fowler, Keith Kyle, Dale Wallace, Gary Poole	Brandon Curling Club	Winnipeg	Winnipeg Arena
1988	Kerry Burtnyk, Jim Spencer, Ron Kammerlock, Don Harvey	Assiniboine Memorial Curling Club	Morden	Morden Recreation Complex
1989	Orest Meleschuk, John Usackis, John Hyrich, Sean Meleschuk	Lac du Bonnet Curling Club	Winnipeg	Winnipeg Arena
1990	Duane Edwards, Kelly McMechan, Don Williams, Jack Edwards	Deloraine Curling Club	Winnipeg	Winnipeg Arena
1991	Jeff Stoughton, Dave Iverson, Ken Tresoor, Garry Van Den Berghe	Wildewood Curling Club	Brandon	Keystone Centre
1992	**Vic Peters, Dan Carey, Chris Neufeld, Don Rudd**	Granite Curling Club	Winnipeg	Winnipeg Arena
1993	Vic Peters, Dan Carey, Chris Neufeld, Don Rudd	Granite Curling Club	Selkirk	Selkirk Arena
1994	Dave Smith, Peter Nicholls, Scott Grant, Charlie Salina	St. Vital Curling Club	Thompson	C. A. Nesbitt Arena
1995	**Kerry Burtnyk, Jeff Ryan, Rob Meakin, Keith Fenton**	Assiniboine Memorial Curling Club	Winnipeg	Winnipeg Arena
1996	**Jeff Stoughton, Ken Tresoor, Garry Van Den Berghe, Steve Gould**	Charleswood Curling Club	Brandon	Keystone Centre
1997	Vic Peters, Dan Carey, Chris Neufeld, Scott Grant	Granite Curling Club	Morden	Morden Rec Centre
1998	Dale Duguid, James Kirkness, Jim Spencer, Doug Armstrong	Granite Curling Club	Virden	Virden Rec Centre
1999	**Jeff Stoughton, Jon Mead, Garry Van Den Berghe, Doug Armstrong**	Charleswood Curling Club	Portage la Prairie	Portage Centennial Arena
2000	Jeff Stoughton, Jon Mead, Garry Van Den Berghe, Doug Armstrong	Charleswood Curling Club	Neepawa	Yellowhead Arena
2001	Kerry Burtnyk, Jeff Ryan, Rob Meakin, Keith Fenton	Assiniboine Memorial Curling Club	Selkirk	Selkirk Recreation Complex
2002	Mark Lukowich, Chris Suchy, Dave Elias, Shane Kilgallen	Valour Road Curling Club	Neepawa	Yellowhead Arena
2003	John Bubbs, Bob Jenion, Bob Scales, Dan Kelsch	Granite Curling Club	Portage la Prairie	Portage Centennial Arena
2004	Brent Scales, Gord Hardy, Grant Spicer, Todd Trevellyan	Swan River Curling Club	Brandon	Keystone Centre
2005	Randy Dutiaume, Dave Elias, Greg Melnichuk, Shane Kilgallen	Valour Road Curling Club	Selkirk	Selkirk Recreation Centre
2006	Jeff Stoughton, Jon Mead, Garry Van Den Berghe, Steve Gould	Charleswood Curling Club	Steinbach	T.G. Smith Centre
2007	Jeff Stoughton, Ryan Fry, Rob Fowler, Steve Gould	Charleswood Curling Club	Dauphin	Credit Union Place
2008	Kerry Burtnyk, Dan Kammerlock, Richard Daneault, Garth Smith	Assiniboine Memorial Curling Club	Brandon	Keystone Centre
2009	Jeff Stoughton, Kevin Park, Rob Fowler, Steve Gould	Charleswood Curling Club	Selkirk	Selkirk Recreation Centre
2010	Jeff Stoughton, Kevin Park, Rob Fowler, Steve Gould	Charleswood Curling Club	Steinbach	T.G. Smith Centre
2011	**Jeff Stoughton, Jon Mead, Reid Carruthers, Steve Gould**	Charleswood Curling Club	Beausejour	Sun Gro Centre
2012	Rob Fowler, Allan Lyburn, Richard Daneault, Derek Samagalski	Brandon Curling Club	Dauphin	Credit Union Place
2013	Jeff Stoughton, Jon Mead, Reid Carruthers, Mark Nichols	Charleswood Curling Club	Neepawa	Yellowhead Centre
2014	Jeff Stoughton, Jon Mead, Reid Carruthers, Mark Nichols	Charleswood Curling Club	Winnipeg	MTS Iceplex
2015	Reid Carruthers, Braeden Moskowy, Derek Samagalski, Colin Hodgson	West St. Paul Curling Club	Brandon	Keystone Centre
2016	Mike McEwen, B. J. Neufeld, Matt Wozniak, Denni Neufeld	Fort Rouge Curling Club	Selkirk	Selkirk Recreation Complex
2017	Mike McEwen, B. J. Neufeld, Matt Wozniak, Denni Neufeld	Fort Rouge Curling Club	Portage la Prairie	Stride Place
2018	Reid Carruthers, Braeden Moskowy, Derek Samagalski, Colin Hodgson	West St. Paul Curling Club	Winkler	Winkler Centennial Arena
2019	Mike McEwen, Reid Carruthers, Derek Samagalski, Colin Hodgson	West St. Paul Curling Club	Virden	Tundra Oil and Gas Place
2020	Jason Gunnlaugson, Alex Forrest, Adam Casey, Connor Njegovan	Morris Curling Club	Winnipeg	Eric Coy Arena
2021	Cancelled due to the COVID-19 pandemic in Manitoba. Jason Gunnlaugson, Adam Casey, Matt Wozniak and Connor Njegovan represented Manitoba at Brier			
2022	Mike McEwen, Reid Carruthers, Derek Samagalski, Colin Hodgson	West St. Paul Curling Club	Selkirk	Selkirk Curling Club
2023	Matt Dunstone, B. J. Neufeld, Colton Lott, Ryan Harnden	Fort Rouge Curling Club	Neepawa	Yellowhead Community Recreation Centre
2024	Brad Jacobs, Reid Carruthers, Derek Samagalski, Connor Njegovan	Granite Curling Club	Stonewall	Veterans Memorial Sports Complex
2025	Reid Carruthers, B.J. Neufeld, Catlin Schneider, Connor Njegovan	Granite Curling Club	Portage la Prairie	Stride Place
2026	Braden Calvert, Corey Chambers, Kyle Kurz, Brendan Bilawka, Rob Gordon	Heather Curling Club	Selkirk	Selkirk Recreation Complex

== Other Manitoba teams at the Brier ==
Beginning in 2015, the defending Brier champion automatically earned a berth for the following years' national championship as "Team Canada". A team from Manitoba has yet to play as "Team Canada" at the Brier. A Wildcard entry was added in 2018, which was expanded to three entries in 2021. Two of these entries became prequalifying entries in 2024.

Brier	Team name	Team	Club
2018	Wildcard	Mike McEwen, B. J. Neufeld, Matt Wozniak, Denni Neufeld	Fort Rouge
2018	— (Note: Lost Wildcard Game)	Jason Gunnlaugson, Alex Forrest, Ian McMillan, Connor Njegovan	Granite
2020	Wild Card	Mike McEwen, Reid Carruthers, Derek Samagalski, Colin Hodgson	West St. Paul
2021	Wild Card #1	Mike McEwen, Reid Carruthers, Derek Samagalski, Colin Hodgson	West St. Paul
2022	Wild Card #3	Jason Gunnlaugson, Adam Casey, Matt Wozniak, Connor Njegovan	Morris
2023	Wild Card #2	Reid Carruthers, Derek Samagalski, Connor Njegovan, Rob Gordon	Morris
2024	Manitoba–Dunstone	Matt Dunstone, B. J. Neufeld, Colton Lott, Ryan Harnden	Fort Rouge
2025	Manitoba–Dunstone	Matt Dunstone, Colton Lott, E. J. Harnden, Ryan Harnden	Fort Rouge
2026	Manitoba–Dunstone	Matt Dunstone, Colton Lott, E. J. Harnden, Ryan Harnden	Fort Rouge
