= 1928 Macdonald Brier =

1928 Macdonald Brier Tankard
- Host city: Toronto, Ontario
- Arena: Granite Club, Toronto
- Dates: February 28–March 2
- Winner: Manitoba
- Curling club: Strathcona CC, Winnipeg
- Skip: Gordon Hudson
- Third: Sam Penwarden
- Second: Ron Singbusch
- Lead: Bill Grant
- Finalist: Alberta (Joe Heartwell); Toronto (Charlie Snow)

The 1928 Macdonald Brier Tankard, the Canadian men's national curling championship, was held February 28 to March 2 at the Granite Club in Toronto.

For the first time, a tiebreaker playoff would determine the Brier champion, as Alberta, Manitoba, and Toronto all finished round robin play with 7–2 records. Team Manitoba, which was skipped by Gordon Hudson defeated both Toronto and Alberta in the playoff to win the Brier.

== Event summary ==
After a successful Brier in 1927, the 1928 edition of the tournament was held again at the Granite Club in Toronto. For the first time, teams from Alberta, Manitoba, and Saskatchewan brought their own teams to the Brier. This increased the Brier field from 8 to 10 teams, which would last until 1931. In addition, regulation games would be shortened from 14 ends to 12 ends.

After a 7-0 start, it appeared that Team Manitoba would cruise to a Brier championship. But Manitoba would lose their last two games and finish in a three-way tie with Alberta and Toronto with 7-2 records, necessitating a tiebreaker playoff between those three teams. The trustees of the event did not anticipate a three way tie, so had to scramble to devise a format to resolve it. They opted for a round robin between the three teams. Manitoba defeated Alberta 12–7 in the first game, and then beat Toronto in the second game, 10–6 to claim the Brier Tankard. Alberta then beat Toronto 12–11 to finish in second place.

== Teams ==
The teams are listed as follows:

Alberta	Manitoba	Montreal	New Brunswick	Northern Ontario
Rosetown CC, Rosetown, SK Skip: Joe Heartwell; Third: Charles Taylor; Second: John Lang; Lead: Allan Duncan	Strathcona CC, Winnipeg Skip: Gordon Hudson; Third: Sam Penwarden; Second: Ron Singbusch; Lead: Bill Grant	Granite CC, Montreal Skip: William Hutchison; Third: N.D.McLeod; Second: T. Howard "Thane" Stewart; Lead: Roy Ormiston	Thistle CC, Saint John Skip: Johnny Malcolm; Third: Bill Shaw; Second: John Trigg; Lead: Frank White	Sudbury CC, Sudbury Skip: Albert Tobey; Third: Frank Muirhead; Second: Bob Morrison; Lead: Jim Scott
Nova Scotia	Ontario	Quebec	Saskatchewan	Toronto
Sydney CC, Sydney Skip: Harry Stevenson; Third: Hugh Ross; Second: W.D. MacKay; Lead: J.B. Lynch	Granite CC, Toronto Skip: Vic McWilliams; Third: Ed Brower; Second: John Brandon; Lead: Bob Hamilton	Victoria CC, Quebec City Skip: S.G. Newton; Third: E.L. Altheer; Second: W.J. Banks; Lead: J.E. Purcell	Regina CC, Regina Skip: W.L. McGillivray; Third: Fred Graham; Second: Ralph Teasdale; Lead: C.S. Pace	Lakeview CC, Toronto Skip: Charlie Snow; Third: Harvey Sproule; Second: Stu Graham; Lead: Thomas Dale

== Map of teams ==
Provincial Winners

== Round-robin standings ==
Key
Teams to Tiebreaker

Team	Skip	W	L	PF	PA
Manitoba	Gordon Hudson	7	2	111	60
Alberta	Joe Heartwell	7	2	108	71
Toronto	Charles Snow	7	2	108	95
Ontario	Vic McWilliams	6	3	120	88
Northern Ontario	Albert Tobey	5	4	94	105
Saskatchewan	W.L. McGillivray	5	4	108	87
Nova Scotia	Harry Stevenson	4	5	78	104
New Brunswick	Johnny Malcolm	3	6	93	102
Quebec	S.G. Newton	1	8	75	131
Montreal	William Hutchison	0	9	81	133

== Round-robin results ==
=== Draw 1 ===
Tuesday, February 28 (morning)

Sheet A	1	2	3	4	5	6	7	8	9	10	11	12	Final
Montreal (Hutchison)	0	0	1	3	1	0	0	1	0	1	0	0	7
New Brunswick (Malcolm)	4	1	0	0	0	1	3	0	1	0	2	3	15

Sheet B	1	2	3	4	5	6	7	8	9	10	11	12	Final
Saskatchewan (McGillivray)	0	2	0	0	1	0	1	1	0	0	1	2	8
Toronto (Snow)	3	0	3	1	0	1	0	0	3	3	0	0	14

Sheet C	1	2	3	4	5	6	7	8	9	10	11	12	Final
Nova Scotia (Stevenson)	0	0	1	0	0	2	1	1	0	1	0	1	7
Manitoba (Hudson)	4	1	0	2	1	0	0	0	2	0	1	0	11

Sheet D	1	2	3	4	5	6	7	8	9	10	11	12	Final
Northern Ontario (Tobey)	0	0	1	0	2	1	1	0	0	3	0	0	8
Ontario (McWilliams)	1	2	0	2	0	0	0	2	3	0	3	1	14

Sheet E	1	2	3	4	5	6	7	8	9	10	11	12	Final
Alberta (Heartwell)	2	0	1	2	2	0	0	2	1	2	0	1	13
Quebec (Newton)	0	2	0	0	0	2	1	0	0	0	2	0	7

=== Draw 2 ===
Tuesday, February 28 (afternoon)

Sheet A	1	2	3	4	5	6	7	8	9	10	11	12	Final
Toronto (Snow)	0	1	0	0	0	0	0	1	0	0	1	X	3
Alberta (Heartwell)	1	0	3	2	1	2	1	0	2	3	0	X	15

Sheet B	1	2	3	4	5	6	7	8	9	10	11	12	Final
Ontario (McWilliams)	0	4	0	5	2	0	5	0	1	0	2	0	19
Montreal (Hutchison)	1	0	1	0	0	1	0	1	0	1	0	2	7

Sheet C	1	2	3	4	5	6	7	8	9	10	11	12	Final
Quebec (Newton)	0	3	0	0	0	1	1	0	0	0	4	2	11
Northern Ontario (Tobey)	1	0	3	3	2	0	0	2	2	1	0	0	14

Sheet D	1	2	3	4	5	6	7	8	9	10	11	12	Final
Manitoba (Hudson)	0	0	0	1	3	2	0	1	0	3	1	0	11
Saskatchewan (McGillivray)	1	1	1	0	0	0	2	0	1	0	0	2	8

Sheet E	1	2	3	4	5	6	7	8	9	10	11	12	Final
New Brunswick (Malcolm)	0	1	1	0	2	0	1	1	0	1	0	2	9
Nova Scotia (Stevenson)	2	0	0	2	0	2	0	0	2	0	2	0	10

=== Draw 3 ===
Sheet A	1	2	3	4	5	6	7	8	9	10	11	12	Final
Manitoba (Hudson)	1	3	0	3	1	2	1	1	1	0	2	2	17
Quebec (Newton)	0	0	2	0	0	0	0	0	0	1	0	0	3

Sheet B	1	2	3	4	5	6	7	8	9	10	11	12	Final
Alberta (Heartwell)	3	1	3	2	0	0	0	3	0	0	1	X	13
New Brunswick (Malcolm)	0	0	0	0	3	1	1	0	1	1	0	X	7

Sheet C	1	2	3	4	5	6	7	8	9	10	11	12	Final
Saskatchewan (McGillivray)	0	3	0	0	2	0	3	1	1	0	2	0	12
Ontario (McWilliams)	1	0	3	1	0	2	0	0	0	2	0	1	10

Sheet D	1	2	3	4	5	6	7	8	9	10	11	12	Final
Toronto (Snow)	3	0	0	2	3	0	0	1	0	3	1	1	14
Montreal (Hutchison)	0	3	2	0	0	2	2	0	1	0	0	0	10

Sheet E	1	2	3	4	5	6	7	8	9	10	11	12	Final
Northern Ontario (Tobey)	3	0	2	0	2	0	2	0	4	0	1	1	15
Nova Scotia (Stevenson)	0	1	0	1	0	1	0	3	0	2	0	0	8

=== Draw 4 ===
Sheet A	1	2	3	4	5	6	7	8	9	10	11	12	Final
Manitoba (Hudson)	1	4	0	0	2	2	1	4	1	1	X	X	16
Northern Ontario (Tobey)	0	0	1	1	0	0	0	0	0	0	X	X	2

Sheet B	1	2	3	4	5	6	7	8	9	10	11	12	Final
Alberta (Heartwell)	0	0	0	2	0	0	2	0	0	2	2	0	8
Saskatchewan (McGillivray)	1	1	1	0	2	1	0	1	3	0	0	1	11

Sheet C	1	2	3	4	5	6	7	8	9	10	11	12	Final
New Brunswick (Malcolm)	3	0	0	0	0	1	5	0	0	0	3	1	13
Quebec (Newton)	0	3	1	1	1	0	0	2	1	3	0	0	12

Sheet D	1	2	3	4	5	6	7	8	9	10	11	12	Final
Toronto (Snow)	2	0	0	1	0	5	0	1	3	0	2	0	14
Ontario (McWilliams)	0	3	2	0	1	0	1	0	0	1	0	3	11

Sheet E	1	2	3	4	5	6	7	8	9	10	11	12	13	Final
Nova Scotia (Stevenson)	2	1	0	0	0	1	0	4	0	0	0	2	2	12
Montreal (Hutchison)	0	0	1	2	1	0	1	0	1	2	2	0	0	10

=== Draw 5 ===
Sheet A	1	2	3	4	5	6	7	8	9	10	11	12	Final
Manitoba (Hudson)	2	1	0	2	0	3	0	0	3	1	1	1	14
New Brunswick (Malcolm)	0	0	1	0	1	0	1	1	0	0	0	0	4

Sheet B	1	2	3	4	5	6	7	8	9	10	11	12	Final
Alberta (Heartwell)	1	1	2	0	2	2	0	0	3	2	0	1	14
Ontario (McWilliams)	0	0	0	4	0	0	4	1	0	0	2	0	11

Sheet C	1	2	3	4	5	6	7	8	9	10	11	12	Final
Saskatchewan (McGillivray)	3	1	1	0	1	3	2	3	2	0	0	2	18
Quebec (Newton)	0	0	0	2	0	0	0	0	0	1	1	0	4

Sheet D	1	2	3	4	5	6	7	8	9	10	11	12	Final
Northern Ontario (Tobey)	2	0	1	2	0	1	1	3	0	4	0	0	14
Montreal (Hutchison)	0	4	0	0	2	0	0	0	2	0	1	2	11

Sheet E	1	2	3	4	5	6	7	8	9	10	11	12	Final
Toronto (Snow)	1	2	2	0	0	1	0	1	0	3	1	0	11
Nova Scotia (Stevenson)	0	0	0	2	1	0	1	0	1	0	0	3	8

=== Draw 6 ===
Sheet A	1	2	3	4	5	6	7	8	9	10	11	12	Final
Manitoba (Hudson)	3	1	0	0	0	0	2	3	1	4	0	0	14
Montreal (Hutchison)	0	0	3	1	1	1	0	0	0	0	1	3	10

Sheet B	1	2	3	4	5	6	7	8	9	10	11	12	Final
Northern Ontario (Tobey)	3	0	0	2	1	0	1	1	1	2	0	0	11
Alberta (Heartwell)	0	1	2	0	0	2	0	0	0	0	3	1	9

Sheet C	1	2	3	4	5	6	7	8	9	10	11	12	Final
Toronto (Snow)	0	0	1	0	3	0	4	1	0	3	0	4	16
Quebec (Newton)	3	0	0	3	0	2	0	0	1	0	1	0	10

Sheet D	1	2	3	4	5	6	7	8	9	10	11	12	Final
Saskatchewan (McGillivray)	1	0	2	4	0	0	1	3	0	0	0	1	12
New Brunswick (Malcolm)	0	1	0	0	3	2	0	0	2	2	1	0	11

Sheet E	1	2	3	4	5	6	7	8	9	10	11	12	Final
Ontario (McWilliams)	3	1	0	1	2	2	1	0	3	0	0	1	14
Nova Scotia (Stevenson)	0	0	1	0	0	0	0	2	0	1	3	0	7

=== Draw 7 ===
Sheet A	1	2	3	4	5	6	7	8	9	10	11	12	Final
Alberta (Heartwell)	5	2	0	0	2	0	0	1	1	1	2	X	14
Nova Scotia (Stevenson)	0	0	1	1	0	1	1	0	0	0	0	X	4

Sheet B	1	2	3	4	5	6	7	8	9	10	11	12	Final
Northern Ontario (Tobey)	1	0	2	2	2	0	0	0	0	0	2	0	9
New Brunswick (Malcolm)	0	1	0	0	0	1	2	1	1	3	0	2	11

Sheet C	1	2	3	4	5	6	7	8	9	10	11	12	Final
Manitoba (Hudson)	2	0	0	1	0	0	3	1	1	2	0	2	12
Toronto (Snow)	0	2	1	0	0	3	0	0	0	0	2	0	8

Sheet D	1	2	3	4	5	6	7	8	9	10	11	12	Final
Saskatchewan (McGillivray)	1	1	0	1	0	2	0	7	2	0	0	6	20
Montreal (Hutchison)	0	0	1	0	2	0	1	0	0	2	1	0	7

Sheet E	1	2	3	4	5	6	7	8	9	10	11	12	Final
Ontario (McWilliams)	4	1	0	4	2	0	0	1	5	2	0	X	19
Quebec (Newton)	0	0	1	0	0	1	1	0	0	0	3	X	6

=== Draw 8 ===
Sheet A	1	2	3	4	5	6	7	8	9	10	11	12	Final
Alberta (Heartwell)	0	4	0	0	1	0	0	2	0	1	0	1	9
Manitoba (Hudson)	0	0	2	1	0	1	2	0	2	0	0	0	8

Sheet B	1	2	3	4	5	6	7	8	9	10	11	12	Final
Quebec (Newton)	1	0	2	2	0	1	1	1	0	3	1	0	12
Montreal (Hutchison)	0	1	0	0	3	0	0	0	4	0	0	2	10

Sheet C	1	2	3	4	5	6	7	8	9	10	11	12	Final
Toronto (Snow)	1	3	3	0	2	0	0	1	2	0	3	1	16
Northern Ontario (Tobey)	0	0	0	3	0	4	2	0	0	1	0	0	10

Sheet D	1	2	3	4	5	6	7	8	9	10	11	12	Final
Nova Scotia (Stevenson)	3	0	0	0	0	0	0	2	1	0	5	0	11
Saskatchewan (McGillivray)	0	1	1	1	1	1	1	0	0	2	0	2	10

Sheet E	1	2	3	4	5	6	7	8	9	10	11	12	Final
Ontario (McWilliams)	0	2	2	0	3	4	0	1	0	0	0	1	13
New Brunswick (Malcolm)	2	0	0	1	0	0	4	0	1	1	3	0	12

=== Draw 9 ===
Sheet A	1	2	3	4	5	6	7	8	9	10	11	12	13	Final
Ontario (McWilliams)	1	2	0	0	0	2	1	0	1	1	0	0	1	9
Manitoba (Hudson)	0	0	2	1	1	0	0	1	0	0	2	1	0	8

Sheet B	1	2	3	4	5	6	7	8	9	10	11	12	Final
Toronto (Snow)	3	0	1	0	2	0	2	2	1	1	0	0	12
New Brunswick (Malcolm)	0	4	0	2	0	2	0	0	0	0	1	2	11

Sheet C	1	2	3	4	5	6	7	8	9	10	11	12	Final
Northern Ontario (Tobey)	1	0	3	0	0	0	0	3	0	1	0	3	11
Saskatchewan (McGillivray)	0	2	0	1	1	1	1	0	1	0	2	0	9

Sheet D	1	2	3	4	5	6	7	8	9	10	11	12	Final
Montreal (Hutchison)	2	0	0	2	0	2	0	0	1	0	2	0	9
Alberta (Heartwell)	0	1	3	0	2	0	1	2	0	3	0	1	13

Sheet E	1	2	3	4	5	6	7	8	9	10	11	12	Final
Nova Scotia (Stevenson)	3	1	0	0	4	1	1	0	1	0	0	0	11
Quebec (Newton)	0	0	2	3	0	0	0	1	0	1	2	1	10

== Tiebreakers ==
Friday, March 2

Sheet A	1	2	3	4	5	6	7	8	9	10	11	12	Final
Manitoba (Hudson)	0	2	1	2	1	1	0	1	0	0	3	1	12
Alberta (Heartwell)	3	0	0	0	0	0	1	0	1	2	0	0	7

Sheet A	1	2	3	4	5	6	7	8	9	10	11	12	Final
Manitoba (Hudson)	0	2	0	0	3	1	2	1	0	1	0	X	10
Toronto (Snow)	1	0	2	1	0	0	0	0	1	0	1	X	6

Sheet A	1	2	3	4	5	6	7	8	9	10	11	12	Final
Alberta (Heartwell)	0	3	0	4	0	1	0	1	0	0	3	0	12
Toronto (Snow)	3	0	1	0	2	0	2	0	0	1	0	2	11

== Provincial and territorial playdowns ==
- 1928 Alberta Provincial Playoffs (Alberta–British Columbia). The winning Heartwell rink had lost in the Saskatchewan playdowns, and decided to then play in the Alberta playdowns as well. No residency rule existed at the time.
- 1928 Macdonald Brier Event at the Manitoba Bonspiel (Manitoba)
- Composite rink: Montreal
- 1928 New Brunswick Championship (New Brunswick)
- Holt, Renfrew Trophy Winners at the Quebec Bonspiel (Quebec)
- Regina Bonspiel (Saskatchewan)
- 1928 Canada Life Trophy (Toronto)
