= The Brier =

Canadian men's curling championship

Montana's Brier
- Established: 1927; 99 years ago
- 2026 host city: St. John's, Newfoundland and Labrador
- 2026 arena: Mary Brown's Centre
- 2026 champion: Manitoba (Matt Dunstone)

Current edition
- 2026 Montana's Brier

The Brier (French: Le Brier), known since 2024 as the Montana's Brier for sponsorship reasons, is the annual Canadian men's curling championship, sanctioned by Curling Canada. The Brier has been held since 1927, traditionally during the month of March.

The winner of the Brier goes on to represent Canada at the World Curling Championships of the same year. The Brier is the best supported curling competition in terms of paid attendance, attracting crowds far larger than even those for World Championships held in Canada.

Its current main sponsor is Montana's, a Canadian restaurant chain. "Brier" originally referred to a brand of tobacco sold by the event's first sponsor, the Macdonald Tobacco Company.

== History ==
In 1924, George J. Cameron, the president of the W. L. Mackenzie and Company subsidiary of the Macdonald Tobacco Company, pitched the idea of a national curling championship to Macdonald Tobacco and was accepted. At the time Canadian curling was divided between the use of granite and iron curling stones, with the latter being used in Quebec and Eastern Ontario and the former being used everywhere else. The granite camp held the advantage, as Macdonald Tobacco's T. Howard Stewart, brother of company president Walter Stewart, supported the use of granites, and was able to influence the decision to use granite stones for the new national championship.

Macdonald Tobacco further developed the concept, in 1925 and 1926, by sponsoring the winners of the "Macdonald Brier Trophy" at the MCA Bonspiel to travel to Eastern Canada. In 1925, the Manitoba team played a number of exhibition games against local teams, while the 1926 team played in the Quebec Bonspiel. The visits were deemed popular enough for Macdonald Tobacco to move forward with sponsorship of a full national championship in 1927.

The first Brier was held at the Granite Club in Toronto in 1927. Eight teams from across the country participated, representing Western Canada, Ontario, Quebec, New Brunswick, Nova Scotia, Northern Ontario, Toronto and Montreal. Games lasted 14 ends, and each team played each other in a 7-game round robin with no playoffs unless there was a tie for first. The first Brier champion was Nova Scotia, a rink skipped by Murray Macneill, with teammates Al MacInnes, Cliff Torey and Jim Donahue – who were normally skips in their own right, but were added to the Macneill rink because the rest of his normal team could not make the trip.

By 1928, games were shortened to 12 ends in length and the single Western Canada team was replaced by individual teams from Alberta, Saskatchewan and Manitoba, increasing the total number of teams to 10 – seven provinces, two cities and the region of Northern Ontario. In the 1932 Brier, the cities of Montreal and Toronto were dropped from competition, but Northern Ontario kept its entry, and still remains the only non provincial or territorial entry to this day. In 1936, Prince Edward Island and British Columbia were given entries. The Dominion of Newfoundland did not become part of Canada until after the 1949 Brier, so the team representing the new province of Newfoundland (later Newfoundland and Labrador) did not join the Brier until 1951. In 1975, a single combined team representing the federal territories of Yukon and Northwest Territories joined the Brier competition. In 1977, games were shortened to 10 ends, which is the current length for matches. Games had to be played in their entirety until the 1974 Brier, when the rules were changed to the present standard of allowing a team to concede defeat before the end of the match if they wished.

The Brier would continue to be played at the Granite Club in Toronto through to the 1940 competition. After then, the event would travel around the country, and would be played in all 10 provinces. Also at this point, rocks were coloured differently for each team and were matched to be of equal size. Play was discontinued between 1943 and 1945 due to World War II. After World War II, the event became more of a popular sporting spectacle across the country thanks to Macdonald Tobacco enlisting media outlets to cover the event. In 1946, the Canadian Broadcasting Corporation (CBC) began covering the event live across the country on the radio. By the 1960s, the CBC began showing curling on television, at first giving daily half-hour reports. In 1962, the CBC showed the tie-breaking playoff match up. In 1973, CBC began regularly showing live coverage of the final draw of the event. Today, TSN covers the entire tournament. CBC had covered the semi-finals and the finals up until the 2007–08 season. In 2013, Sportsnet and City began to offer coverage of the finals of the provincial playdowns in Manitoba, Ontario, Alberta, and British Columbia as well.

In 1977, Macdonald Tobacco announced it would no longer be sponsoring the Brier, and the 1979 event would be the last one titled the Macdonald Brier. A committee headed by the Canadian Curling Association (today's Curling Canada) was put in charge to find a new sponsor, which would end up being the Labatt Brewing Company. The event retained the "Brier" name, despite the word being the property of Macdonald Tobacco. However, with the Labatt sponsorship came some changes to the event, such as adding a new championship trophy and adding a TV-friendly playoff round after the round robin games. Labatt remained the title sponsor until 2001 when Nokia took over. That sponsorship only lasted four years before Tim Hortons took over, until 2024. When the Labatt sponsorship ended, the original Brier trophy was brought back and the names of the winners during the Labatt era were engraved on it.

Beginning in the 1990s, curling became more profitable, and the event would mostly be held in larger curling friendly markets (such as Edmonton, Calgary, Winnipeg and Saskatoon). At the same time, the World Curling Tour made the sport more lucrative, and curlers demanded cash prizes at the Brier, and the ability to display their sponsors on their jerseys. The Canadian Curling Association ignored their demands, and when the Grand Slam curling series was instituted in 2001, many of the top teams in the country boycotted the Brier in favour of playing in the Slams. Curlers' demands were eventually met and the boycott ended in 2003. The dominant Brier team of the era, the "Ferbey four" did not boycott the Brier, and won both Briers during this era, while other top teams such as Kevin Martin's boycotted the event.

=== Sponsors ===
For the first fifty years, the Brier was sponsored by Macdonald Tobacco (later RJR Tobacco Company and now part of JTI-Macdonald Corporation). The name "Brier", in fact, came from a brand of tobacco being manufactured by Macdonald at the time (a brier being a small shrub whose roots are commonly used to make tobacco pipes). Macdonald was also responsible for introducing both the Brier Tankard trophy (originally named the British Consols Trophy after a brand of cigarettes), and the now famous heart-shaped patches awarded to the tournament winners. The patches were modeled after a small tin heart pressed into the centre of Macdonald tobacco plugs, along with the slogan “The Heart of the Tobacco.” The same heart appeared on tins of Macdonald pipe tobacco. Later, when other national championships were developed, many took the heart as their identifying symbol as well.

The former logo of the Brier, featuring the Tim Hortons logo.

Brier sponsors by year
Years	Sponsor
1927–1979	Macdonald Tobacco
1980–2000	Labatt
2001–2004	Nokia
2005–2023	Tim Hortons
2024–present	Montana's BBQ & Bar

== Qualification and eligibility ==
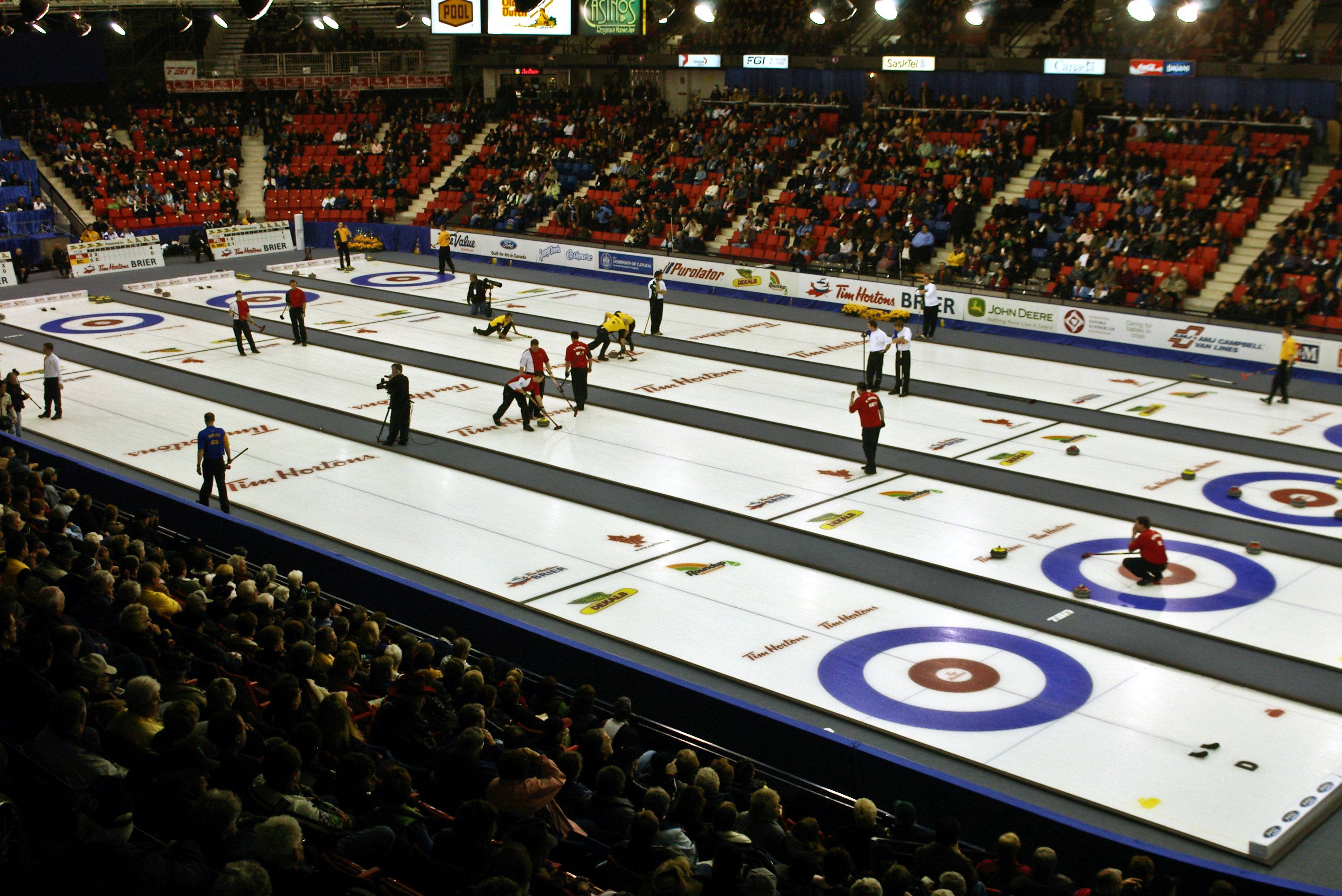
2006 Brier, in Regina

The Brier is currently contested by 18 teams. Most provinces and territories are represented by one team, with the exception of Ontario, which sends two teams (named Ontario and Northern Ontario). Through 2014 the territories sent one team, but starting in 2015 all three territories were permitted to compete individually. Teams qualify for the Brier through their respective provincial championships, which are held every year and are open to any Canadian men's curling team consisting of Canadian citizens. The formats for these championships vary from province to province, but most entail a series of club, municipal, district and/or regional playdowns prior to the provincial championship. Playdown formats vary, with each member association choosing a format suited to its geography and demographics. Originally, nearly all teams regardless of ability or past performance had to qualify for each Brier, starting at the club level when more than one team from a club seeks to enter the playdowns. Today, member associations typically grant past champions and other strong teams automatic entry to the latter stage(s) of the playdowns.

Until 2013, the champions of the Brier did not automatically qualify for the following year's Brier, and had to qualify again. However, beginning in 2014, following the precedent set by its women's counterpart, the Scotties Tournament of Hearts, champions now earn a bye representing Canada during the following year's Brier.

For the three tournaments from 2015 to 2017, fifteen teams (ten provinces, three territories, Northern Ontario, and Team Canada) competed for twelve places in the Brier proper. The four lowest-ranked regions played a pre-qualifying tournament to open the Brier, with the winner advancing to the full round-robin. In this format's first year Nunavut declined to send a team, and the round was between the winners of Prince Edward Island, Nova Scotia, and the Yukon.

Beginning with the 2018 Brier, the event expanded to a sixteen team field, with the ten provinces, three territories, Northern Ontario, and Team Canada being joined by the highest-ranked non-qualified team on the Canadian Team Ranking System standings. The teams are separated into two pools of eight, each playing a round-robin, with the top four teams in each pool advancing to a second pool to determine the final four teams. The pools were tentatively slated to be determined by the CTRS standings as of December 31, 2017.

== Past champions ==
=== Macdonald Brier ===
Year	Winning province	Winning team	Host
1927	Nova Scotia	Murray Macneill, Al MacInnes, Cliff Torey, Jim Donahoe	Toronto, Ontario
1928	Manitoba	Gordon Hudson, Sam Penwarden, Ron Singbush, Bill Grant	Toronto, Ontario (2)
1929	Manitoba	Gordon Hudson, Don Rollo, Ron Singbush, Bill Grant	Toronto, Ontario (3)
1930	Manitoba	Howard Wood Sr., Jimmy Congalton, Victor Wood, Lionel Wood	Toronto, Ontario (4)
1931	Manitoba	Bob Gourley, Ernie Pollard, Arnold Lockerbie, Ray Stewart	Toronto, Ontario (5)
1932	Manitoba	Jimmy Congalton, Howard Wood Sr., Bill Noble, Harry Mawhinney	Toronto, Ontario (6)
1933	Alberta	Cliff Manahan, Harold Deeton, Harold Wolfe, Bert Ross	Toronto, Ontario (7)
1934	Manitoba	Leo Johnson, Lorne Stewart, Linc Johnson, Marno Frederickson	Toronto, Ontario (8)
1935	Ontario	Gordon Campbell, Donnie Campbell, Gord Coates, Duncan Campbell	Toronto, Ontario (9)
1936	Manitoba	Ken Watson, Grant Watson, Marvin MacIntyre, Charles Kerr	Toronto, Ontario (10)
1937	Alberta	Cliff Manahan, Wes Robinson, Ross Manahan, Lloyd McIntyre	Toronto, Ontario (11)
1938	Manitoba	Ab Gowanlock, Bung Cartmell, Bill McKnight, Tom McKnight	Toronto, Ontario (12)
1939	Ontario	Bert Hall, Perry Hall, Ernie Parkes, Cam Seagram	Toronto, Ontario (13)
1940	Manitoba	Howard Wood Sr., Ernie Pollard, Howie Wood Jr., Roy Enman	Winnipeg, Manitoba
1941	Alberta	Howard Palmer, Jack Lebeau, Art Gooder, Clair Webb	Toronto, Ontario (14)
1942	Manitoba	Ken Watson, Grant Watson, Charlie Scrymgeour, Jim Grant	Quebec City, Quebec
1943	Cancelled due to World War II		
1944	Cancelled due to World War II		
1945	Cancelled due to World War II		
1946	Alberta	Billy Rose, Bart Swelin, Austin Smith, George Crooks	Saskatoon, Saskatchewan
1947	Manitoba	Jimmy Welsh, Alex Welsh, Jock Reid, Harry Monk	Saint John, New Brunswick
1948	British Columbia	Frenchy D'Amour, Bob McGhie, Fred Wendell, Jim Mark	Calgary, Alberta
1949	Manitoba	Ken Watson, Grant Watson, Lyle Dyker, Charles Read	Hamilton, Ontario
1950	Northern Ontario	Tom Ramsay, Len Williamson, Bill Weston, Billy Kenny	Vancouver, British Columbia
1951	Nova Scotia	Don Oyler, George Hanson, Fred Dyke, Wally Knock	Halifax, Nova Scotia
1952	Manitoba	Billy Walsh, Al Langlois, Andy McWilliams, John Watson	Winnipeg, Manitoba (2)
1953	Manitoba	Ab Gowanlock, Jim Williams, Art Pollon, Russ Jackman	Sudbury, Ontario
1954	Alberta	Matt Baldwin, Glenn Gray, Pete Ferry, Jim Collins	Edmonton, Alberta
1955	Saskatchewan	Garnet Campbell, Don Campbell, Glen Campbell, Lloyd Campbell	Regina, Saskatchewan
1956	Manitoba	Billy Walsh, Al Langlois, Cy White, Andy McWilliams	Moncton, New Brunswick
1957	Alberta	Matt Baldwin, Gordon Haynes, Art Kleinmeyer, Bill Price	Kingston, Ontario
1958	Alberta	Matt Baldwin, Jack Geddes, Gordon Haynes, Bill Price	Victoria, British Columbia
1959	Saskatchewan	Ernie Richardson, Arnold Richardson, Garnet Richardson, Wes Richardson	Quebec City, Quebec (2)
1960	Saskatchewan	Ernie Richardson, Arnold Richardson, Garnet Richardson, Wes Richardson	Fort William, Ontario
1961	Alberta	Hec Gervais, Ron Anton, Ray Werner, Wally Ursuliak	Calgary, Alberta (2)
1962	Saskatchewan	Ernie Richardson, Arnold Richardson, Garnet Richardson, Wes Richardson	Kitchener, Ontario
1963	Saskatchewan	Ernie Richardson, Arnold Richardson, Garnet Richardson, Mel Perry	Brandon, Manitoba
1964	British Columbia	Lyall Dagg, Leo Hebert, Fred Britton, Barry Naimark	Charlottetown, Prince Edward Island
1965	Manitoba	Terry Braunstein, Don Duguid, Ron Braunstein, Ray Turnbull	Saskatoon, Saskatchewan (2)
1966	Alberta	Ron Northcott, George Fink, Bernie Sparkes, Fred Storey	Halifax, Nova Scotia (2)
1967	Ontario	Alf Phillips, Jr., John Ross, Ron Manning, Keith Reilly	Hull, Quebec
1968	Alberta	Ron Northcott, Jim Shields, Bernie Sparkes, Fred Storey	Kelowna, British Columbia
1969	Alberta	Ron Northcott, Dave Gerlach, Bernie Sparkes, Fred Storey	Oshawa, Ontario
1970	Manitoba	Don Duguid, Rod Hunter, Jim Pettapiece, Bryan Wood	Winnipeg, Manitoba (3)
1971	Manitoba	Don Duguid, Rod Hunter, Jim Pettapiece, Bryan Wood	Quebec City, Quebec (3)
1972	Manitoba	Orest Meleschuk, Dave Romano, John Hanesiak, Pat Hailley	St. John's, Newfoundland
1973	Saskatchewan	Harvey Mazinke, Billy Martin, George Achtymichuk, Dan Klippenstein	Edmonton, Alberta (2)
1974	Alberta	Hec Gervais, Ron Anton, Warren Hansen, Darrel Sutton	London, Ontario
1975	Northern Ontario	Bill Tetley, Rick Lang, Bill Hodgson, Peter Hnatiw	Fredericton, New Brunswick
1976	Newfoundland	Jack MacDuff, Toby McDonald, Doug Hudson, Ken Templeton	Regina, Saskatchewan (2)
1977	Quebec	Jim Ursel, Art Lobel, Don Aitken, Brian Ross	Montreal, Quebec
1978	Alberta	Mike Chernoff, Ed Lukowich, Dale Johnston, Ron Schindle	Vancouver, British Columbia (2)
1979	Manitoba	Barry Fry, Bill Carey, Gordon Sparkes, Bryan Wood	Ottawa, Ontario

=== Labatt Brier ===
Year	Winning province	Winning team	Finalist province	Finalist team	Host
1980	Saskatchewan	Rick Folk, Ron Mills, Tom Wilson, Jim Wilson	Northern Ontario	Al Hackner, Rick Lang, Bob Nicol, Bruce Kennedy	Calgary, Alberta (3)
1981	Manitoba	Kerry Burtnyk, Mark Olson, Jim Spencer, Ron Kammerlock	Northern Ontario	Al Hackner, Rick Lang, Bob Nicol, Bruce Kennedy	Halifax, Nova Scotia (3)
1982	Northern Ontario	Al Hackner, Rick Lang, Bob Nicol, Bruce Kennedy	British Columbia	Brent Giles, Greg Monkman, Al Roemer, Brad Giles	Brandon, Manitoba (2)
1983	Ontario	Ed Werenich, Paul Savage, John Kawaja, Neil Harrison	Alberta	Mike Chernoff, Ed Lukowich, Neil Houston, Brent Syme	Sudbury, Ontario (2)
1984	Manitoba	Michael Riley, Brian Toews, John Helston, Russ Wookey	Ontario	Ed Werenich, Paul Savage, John Kawaja, Neil Harrison	Victoria, British Columbia (2)
1985	Northern Ontario	Al Hackner, Rick Lang, Ian Tetley, Pat Perroud	Alberta	Pat Ryan, Gord Trenchie, Don Mckenzie, Don Walchuk	Moncton, New Brunswick (2)
1986	Alberta	Ed Lukowich, John Ferguson, Neil Houston, Brent Syme	Ontario	Russ Howard, Glenn Howard, Tim Belcourt, Kent Carstairs	Kitchener, Ontario (2)
1987	Ontario	Russ Howard, Glenn Howard, Tim Belcourt, Kent Carstairs	British Columbia	Bernie Sparkes, Jim Armstrong, Monte Ziola, Jamie Sexton	Edmonton, Alberta (3)
1988	Alberta	Pat Ryan, Randy Ferbey, Don Walchuk, Don McKenzie	Saskatchewan	Eugene Hritzuk, Del Shaughnessy, Murray Soparlo, Don Dabrowski	Chicoutimi, Quebec
1989	Alberta	Pat Ryan, Randy Ferbey, Don Walchuk, Don McKenzie	British Columbia	Rick Folk, Bert Gretzinger, Rob Koffski, Doug Smith	Saskatoon, Saskatchewan (3)
1990	Ontario	Ed Werenich, John Kawaja, Ian Tetley, Pat Perroud	New Brunswick	Jim Sullivan, Charlie Sullivan, Jr., Craig Burgess, Paul Power	Sault Ste. Marie, Ontario
1991	Alberta	Kevin Martin, Kevin Park, Dan Petryk, Don Bartlett	Saskatchewan	Randy Woytowich, Brian McCusker, Wyatt Buck, John Grundy	Hamilton, Ontario (2)
1992	Manitoba	Vic Peters, Dan Carey, Chris Neufeld, Don Rudd	Ontario	Russ Howard, Glenn Howard, Wayne Middaugh, Peter Corner	Regina, Saskatchewan (3)
1993	Ontario	Russ Howard, Glenn Howard, Wayne Middaugh, Peter Corner	British Columbia	Rick Folk, Pat Ryan, Bert Gretzinger, Gerry Richard	Ottawa, Ontario (2)
1994	British Columbia	Rick Folk, Pat Ryan, Bert Gretzinger, Gerry Richard	Ontario	Russ Howard, Glenn Howard, Wayne Middaugh, Peter Corner	Red Deer, Alberta
1995	Manitoba	Kerry Burtnyk, Jeff Ryan, Rob Meakin, Keith Fenton	Saskatchewan	Brad Heidt, Mark Dacey, Wayne Charteris, Dan Ormsby	Halifax, Nova Scotia (4)
1996	Manitoba	Jeff Stoughton, Ken Tresoor, Garry VanDenBerghe, Steve Gould	Alberta	Kevin Martin, Don Walchuk, Shawn Broda, Don Bartlett	Kamloops, British Columbia
1997	Alberta	Kevin Martin, Don Walchuk, Rudy Ramcharan, Don Bartlett	Manitoba	Vic Peters, Dan Carey, Chris Neufeld, Scott Grant	Calgary, Alberta (4)
1998	Ontario	Wayne Middaugh, Graeme McCarrel, Ian Tetley, Scott Bailey	Quebec	Guy Hemmings, Pierre Charette, Guy Thibaudeau, Dale Ness	Winnipeg, Manitoba (4)
1999	Manitoba	Jeff Stoughton, Jon Mead, Garry VanDenBerghe, Doug Armstrong	Quebec	Guy Hemmings, Pierre Charette, Guy Thibaudeau, Dale Ness	Edmonton, Alberta (4)
2000	British Columbia	Greg McAulay, Brent Pierce, Bryan Miki, Jody Sveistrup	New Brunswick	Russ Howard, Wayne Tallon, Rick Perron, Grant Odishaw	Saskatoon, Saskatchewan (4)

=== Nokia Brier ===
Year	Winning province	Winning team	Finalist province	Finalist team	Host
2001	Alberta	Randy Ferbey, David Nedohin, Scott Pfeifer, Marcel Rocque	Manitoba	Kerry Burtnyk, Jeff Ryan, Rob Meakin, Keith Fenton	Ottawa, Ontario (3)
2002	Alberta	Randy Ferbey, David Nedohin, Scott Pfeifer, Marcel Rocque	Ontario	John Morris, Joe Frans, Craig Savill, Brent Laing	Calgary, Alberta (5)
2003	Alberta	Randy Ferbey, David Nedohin, Scott Pfeifer, Marcel Rocque	Nova Scotia	Mark Dacey, Bruce Lohnes, Rob Harris, Andrew Gibson	Halifax, Nova Scotia (5)
2004	Nova Scotia	Mark Dacey, Bruce Lohnes, Rob Harris, Andrew Gibson	Alberta	Randy Ferbey, David Nedohin, Scott Pfeifer, Marcel Rocque	Saskatoon, Saskatchewan (5)

=== Tim Hortons Brier ===
Tournament	Gold		Silver		Bronze		Host
Tournament	Locale	Team	Locale	Team	Locale	Team	Host
2005	Alberta	Randy Ferbey; David Nedohin; Scott Pfeifer; Marcel Rocque	Nova Scotia	Shawn Adams; Paul Flemming; Craig Burgess; Kelly Mittelstadt	Manitoba	Randy Dutiaume; Dave Elias; Greg Melnichuk; Shane Kilgallen	Edmonton, Alberta (5)
2006	Quebec	Jean-Michel Ménard; François Roberge; Éric Sylvain; Maxime Elmaleh	Ontario	Glenn Howard; Richard Hart; Brent Laing; Craig Savill	Nova Scotia	Mark Dacey; Bruce Lohnes; Rob Harris; Andrew Gibson	Regina, Saskatchewan (4)
2007	Ontario	Glenn Howard; Richard Hart; Brent Laing; Craig Savill	Newfoundland and Labrador	Brad Gushue; Mark Nichols; Chris Schille; Jamie Korab	Manitoba	Jeff Stoughton; Ryan Fry; Rob Fowler; Steve Gould	Hamilton, Ontario (3)
2008	Alberta	Kevin Martin; John Morris; Marc Kennedy; Ben Hebert	Ontario	Glenn Howard; Richard Hart; Brent Laing; Craig Savill	Saskatchewan	Pat Simmons; Jeff Sharp; Gerry Adam; Steve Laycock	Winnipeg, Manitoba (5)
2009	Alberta	Kevin Martin; John Morris; Marc Kennedy; Ben Hebert	Manitoba	Jeff Stoughton; Kevin Park; Rob Fowler; Steve Gould	Ontario	Glenn Howard; Richard Hart; Brent Laing; Craig Savill	Calgary, Alberta (6)
2010	Alberta	Kevin Koe; Blake MacDonald; Carter Rycroft; Nolan Thiessen	Ontario	Glenn Howard; Richard Hart; Brent Laing; Craig Savill	Northern Ontario	Brad Jacobs; E.J. Harnden; Ryan Harnden; Caleb Flaxey	Halifax, Nova Scotia (6)
2011	Manitoba	Jeff Stoughton; Jon Mead; Reid Carruthers; Steve Gould	Ontario	Glenn Howard; Richard Hart; Brent Laing; Craig Savill	Newfoundland and Labrador	Brad Gushue; Mark Nichols; Ryan Fry; Jamie Danbrook	London, Ontario (2)
2012	Ontario	Glenn Howard; Wayne Middaugh; Brent Laing; Craig Savill	Alberta	Kevin Koe; Pat Simmons; Carter Rycroft; Nolan Thiessen	Manitoba	Rob Fowler; Allan Lyburn; Richard Daneault; Derek Samagalski	Saskatoon, Saskatchewan (6)
2013	Northern Ontario	Brad Jacobs; Ryan Fry; E.J. Harnden; Ryan Harnden	Manitoba	Jeff Stoughton; Jon Mead; Reid Carruthers; Mark Nichols	Ontario	Glenn Howard; Wayne Middaugh; Brent Laing; Craig Savill	Edmonton, Alberta (6)
2014	Alberta	Kevin Koe; Pat Simmons; Carter Rycroft; Nolan Thiessen	British Columbia	John Morris; Jim Cotter; Tyrel Griffith; Rick Sawatsky	Manitoba	Jeff Stoughton; Jon Mead; Mark Nichols; Reid Carruthers	Kamloops, British Columbia (2)
2015	Canada	Pat Simmons; John Morris; Carter Rycroft; Nolan Thiessen	Northern Ontario	Brad Jacobs; Ryan Fry; E.J. Harnden; Ryan Harnden	Saskatchewan	Steve Laycock; Kirk Muyres; Colton Flasch; Dallan Muyres	Calgary, Alberta (7)
2016	Alberta	Kevin Koe; Marc Kennedy; Brent Laing; Ben Hebert	Newfoundland and Labrador	Brad Gushue; Mark Nichols; Brett Gallant; Geoff Walker	Northern Ontario	Brad Jacobs; Ryan Fry; E.J. Harnden; Ryan Harnden	Ottawa, Ontario (4)
2017	Newfoundland and Labrador	Brad Gushue; Mark Nichols; Brett Gallant; Geoff Walker	Canada	Kevin Koe; Marc Kennedy; Brent Laing; Ben Hebert	Manitoba	Mike McEwen; B.J. Neufeld; Matt Wozniak; Denni Neufeld	St. John's, Newfoundland and Labrador (2)
2018	Canada	Brad Gushue; Mark Nichols; Brett Gallant; Geoff Walker	Alberta	Brendan Bottcher; Darren Moulding; Brad Thiessen; Karrick Martin	Ontario	John Epping; Mat Camm; Pat Janssen; Tim March	Regina, Saskatchewan (5)
2019	Alberta	Kevin Koe; B.J. Neufeld; Colton Flasch; Ben Hebert	(Alberta) Wild Card	Brendan Bottcher; Darren Moulding; Brad Thiessen; Karrick Martin	Northern Ontario	Brad Jacobs; Ryan Fry; E.J. Harnden; Ryan Harnden	Brandon, Manitoba (3)
2020	Newfoundland and Labrador	Brad Gushue; Mark Nichols; Brett Gallant; Geoff Walker	Alberta	Brendan Bottcher; Darren Moulding; Brad Thiessen; Karrick Martin	Saskatchewan	Matt Dunstone; Braeden Moskowy; Catlin Schneider; Dustin Kidby	Kingston, Ontario (2)
2021	Alberta	Brendan Bottcher; Darren Moulding; Brad Thiessen; Karrick Martin	(Alberta) Wild Card 2	Kevin Koe; B.J. Neufeld; John Morris; Ben Hebert	Saskatchewan	Matt Dunstone; Braeden Moskowy; Kirk Muyres; Dustin Kidby	Calgary, Alberta (8)
2022	(Newfoundland and Labrador) Wild Card 1	Brad Gushue; Mark Nichols; Brett Gallant; Geoff Walker	Alberta	Kevin Koe; B.J. Neufeld; John Morris; Ben Hebert	Canada	Brendan Bottcher; Pat Janssen; Brad Thiessen; Karrick Martin	Lethbridge, Alberta
2023	Canada	Brad Gushue; Mark Nichols; E.J. Harnden; Geoff Walker	Manitoba	Matt Dunstone; B.J. Neufeld; Colton Lott; Ryan Harnden	(Alberta) Wild Card 1	Brendan Bottcher; Marc Kennedy; Brett Gallant; Ben Hebert	London, Ontario (3)

=== Montana's Brier ===
Tournament	Gold		Silver		Bronze		Host
Tournament	Locale	Team	Locale	Team	Locale	Team	Host
2024	Canada	Brad Gushue; Mark Nichols; E.J. Harnden; Geoff Walker	Saskatchewan	Mike McEwen; Colton Flasch; Kevin Marsh; Dan Marsh	Alberta (Bottcher)	Brendan Bottcher; Marc Kennedy; Brett Gallant; Ben Hebert	Regina, Saskatchewan (6)
2025	Alberta (Jacobs)	Brad Jacobs; Marc Kennedy; Brett Gallant; Ben Hebert	Manitoba (Dunstone)	Matt Dunstone; Colton Lott; E.J. Harnden; Ryan Harnden	Canada	Brad Gushue; Mark Nichols; Brendan Bottcher; Geoff Walker	Kelowna, British Columbia (2)
2026	Manitoba (Dunstone)	Matt Dunstone; Colton Lott; E.J. Harnden; Ryan Harnden	Alberta	Kevin Koe; Tyler Tardi; Aaron Sluchinski; Karrick Martin	Canada	Brad Jacobs; Marc Kennedy; Brett Gallant; Ben Hebert	St. John's, Newfoundland and Labrador (3)
2027							Saskatoon, Saskatchewan (7)
2028							Red Deer, Alberta (2)

== Top 3 finishes table ==
As of the 2026 Brier

Prior to the 2011 Brier, there were no bronze medal games, so the third-place finishes listed in the table are for the teams that finished third in the tournament. Following the introduction of bronze medal games, which were played between the loser of the 3 versus 4 page playoff game and the loser of the semifinal game, the third-place finishes listed are for the teams that won the bronze medal games in each Brier. The bronze medal games were discontinued with the 2018 Brier.

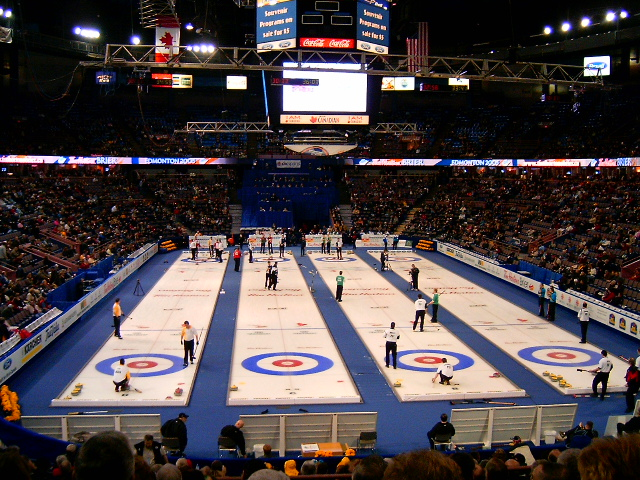
2005 Tim Hortons Brier in Edmonton

Province / Locale	1st	2nd	3rd	Top 3 finishes
Alberta	30	22	9	61
Manitoba	28	16	15	59
Ontario	10	18	13	41
Saskatchewan	7	16	18	41
Northern Ontario	5	6	13	24
British Columbia	4	13	14	31
Canada	4	1	3	8
Nova Scotia	3	3	6	12
Newfoundland and Labrador	3	2	2	7
Quebec	2	4	4	10
Wild Card	1	2	1	4
New Brunswick	0	3	7	10
Yukon/Northwest Territories	0	1	0	1
Toronto	0	0	5	5
Prince Edward Island	0	0	2	2
Northwest Territories				
Nunavut				
Yukon				

== Awards ==
=== Hec Gervais Playoff MVP Award ===
Named for two-time Brier champion Hec Gervais who died in 1997.

Year	Player	Locale
1997	Kevin Martin	Alberta
1998	Graeme McCarrel	Ontario
1999	Jeff Stoughton	Manitoba
2000	Bryan Miki	British Columbia
2001	David Nedohin	Alberta
2002	David Nedohin (2)	Alberta
2003	David Nedohin (3)	Alberta
2004	Mark Dacey	Nova Scotia
2005	David Nedohin (4)	Alberta
2006	Jean-Michel Ménard	Quebec
2007	Glenn Howard	Ontario
2008	John Morris	Alberta
2009	Kevin Martin (2)	Alberta
2010	Kevin Koe	Alberta
2011	Jon Mead	Manitoba
2012	Wayne Middaugh	Ontario
2013	Brad Jacobs	Northern Ontario
2014	Carter Rycroft	Alberta
2015	Pat Simmons	Canada
2016	Kevin Koe (2)	Alberta
2017	Brad Gushue	Newfoundland and Labrador
2018	Brad Gushue (2)	Canada
2019	Kevin Koe (3)	Alberta
2020	Brad Gushue (3)	Newfoundland and Labrador
2021	Brendan Bottcher	Alberta
2022	Brad Gushue (4)	(Newfoundland and Labrador) Wild Card 1
2023	Brad Gushue (5)	Canada
2024	Brad Gushue (6)	Canada
2025	Brad Jacobs (2)	Alberta
2026	E. J. Harnden	Manitoba

=== Ross Harstone Sportsmanship Award ===
Named for Ross Harstone, an Ontario businessman and former member of Brier board of trustees.

Year	Player	Locale
1966	George F. McCharles	Newfoundland
1967	Douglas S. McGibney	British Columbia
1968	Charles Piper, Jr.	Nova Scotia
1969	Bill Piercey	Newfoundland
1970	Ed Steeves	New Brunswick
1971	Bob Pickering	Saskatchewan
1972	David Sullivan	New Brunswick
1973	Mel Watchorn	Alberta
1974	Larry McGrath	Saskatchewan
1975	Harvey Mazinke	Saskatchewan
1976	Jim Ursel	Quebec
1977	Joe Power, Jr.	Newfoundland
1978	Peter Murray	New Brunswick
1979	Dave Durrant	Nova Scotia
1979	Wayne Matheson	Prince Edward Island
1980	Wayne Hamilton	Newfoundland
1981	Mel Watchorn (2)	Alberta
1982	Mark Noseworthy	Newfoundland
1983	Jim Armstrong	British Columbia
1984	John Helston	Manitoba
1985	Daniel Hildebrand	Manitoba
1986	Bill Campbell, Jr.	Nova Scotia
1987	Jim Armstrong (2)	British Columbia
1988	Thomas Hakansson	Nova Scotia
1989	Bert Gretzinger	British Columbia
1990	Craig Lepine	British Columbia
1991	Rick Lang	Northern Ontario
1992	Jim Armstrong (3)	British Columbia
1993	Trevor Alexander	Northwest Territories/Yukon
1994	Mark Noseworthy (2)	Newfoundland
1995	Rick Folk	British Columbia
1996	Brian Rafuse	Nova Scotia
1997	Vic Peters	Manitoba
1998	Toby McDonald	Newfoundland
1999	Gerald Shymko	Saskatchewan
2000	Bryan Miki	British Columbia
2001	Paul Flemming	Nova Scotia
2002	Mark Lang	Saskatchewan
2003	Bob Jenion	Manitoba
2004	Daniel Lafleur	Quebec
2005	Randy Dutiaume	Manitoba
2006	Jean-Michel Ménard	Quebec
2007	Mark Whitehead	Northwest Territories/Yukon
2008	Gerry Adam	Saskatchewan
2009	Dean Hicke	Saskatchewan
2010	Ian Fitzner-LeBlanc	Nova Scotia
2011	Jim Cotter	British Columbia
2012	Scott Manners	Saskatchewan
2013	Paul Flemming (2)	Nova Scotia
2014	Greg Balsdon	Ontario
2015	Jim Cotter (2)	British Columbia
2016	Tyrel Griffith	British Columbia
2017	Jean-Michel Ménard (2)	Quebec
2018	Greg Smith	Newfoundland and Labrador
2019	Darren Moulding	(Alberta) Wild Card
2020	Colin Hodgson	(Manitoba) Wild Card
2021	Brendan Bottcher	Alberta
2022	Scott Saccary	Nova Scotia
2023	Kelly Knapp	Saskatchewan
2024	Luke Saunders	Nova Scotia
2025	Sheldon Wettig	Nunavut
2026	Sheldon Wettig (2)	Nunavut

=== Shot of the Week Award ===
Year	Player	Province
1997	Kevin Martin	Alberta
1998	Guy Hemmings	Quebec
1999	Guy Hemmings (2)	Quebec
2000	Peter Corner	Ontario
2001	Kerry Burtnyk	Manitoba
2002	David Nedohin	Alberta
2003	Bruce Lohnes	Nova Scotia
2004	Jay Peachey	British Columbia
2005	David Nedohin (2)	Alberta
2006	Mark Dacey	Nova Scotia
2007	Dean Joanisse	British Columbia
2008	Glenn Howard	Ontario
2009	Glenn Howard (2)	Ontario
2010	Richard Hart	Ontario
2011	Jeff Stoughton	Manitoba
2012	Glenn Howard (3)	Ontario
2013	Brad Gushue	Newfoundland and Labrador

== Records ==
=== Most Brier wins as skip ===
Only one skip, Brad Gushue, has won the Brier six times (2017, 2018, 2020, 2022, 2023, and 2024).

Four people have won the Brier four times as skip:

- Ernie Richardson (1959, 1960, 1962, 1963)
- Kevin Martin (1991, 1997, 2008, 2009)
- Randy Ferbey (2001, 2002, 2003, 2005)
- Kevin Koe (2010, 2014, 2016, 2019)

=== Top Attendance Records ===
#	Brier	Venue	Total attendance
1	2005	Rexall Place, Edmonton	281,985
2	2000	Saskatchewan Place, Saskatoon	248,793
3	2009	Pengrowth Saddledome, Calgary	246,126
4	2002	Pengrowth Saddledome, Calgary	245,296
5	1999	Skyreach Centre, Edmonton	242,887
6	2004	Saskatchewan Place, Saskatoon	238,129
7	1997	Canadian Airlines Saddledome, Calgary	223,322
8	2013	Rexall Place, Edmonton	190,113
9	2012	Credit Union Centre, Saskatoon	177,226
10	2008	MTS Centre, Winnipeg	165,075
11	2003	Metro Centre, Halifax	158,414
12	2001	Civic Centre, Ottawa	154,136
13	2015	Scotiabank Saddledome, Calgary	151,835
14	1989	Saskatchewan Place, Saskatoon	151,538
15	1998	Winnipeg Arena, Winnipeg	147,017
16	2026	Mary Brown's Centre, St. John's	143,100
17	1994	Centrium, Red Deer	130,625
18	1993	Civic Centre, Ottawa	130,076
19	1996	Riverside Coliseum, Kamloops	127,746
20	2006	Brandt Centre, Regina	125,971
21	2017	Mile One Centre, St. John's	122,592
22	1995	Metro Centre, Halifax	121,896
23	1992	Agridome, Regina	121,555
24	2016	TD Place Arena, Ottawa	115,047
25	2011	John Labatt Centre, London	113,626
26	2018	Brandt Centre, Regina	110,555
27	2010	Metro Centre, Halifax	107,242
28	2007	Copps Coliseum, Hamilton	107,199
29	1982	Keystone Centre, Brandon	106,394
30	2024	Brandt Centre, Regina	101,401

=== Perfect games ===
A perfect game in curling is one in which a player scores 100% on all their shots in a game. Statistics on shots have been kept since 1980 (except for 1982).

Key
Post-Round Robin game
Final game

Curler	Team	Position	Shots	Year	Opponent
Pat Perroud	Northern Ontario	Lead	22	1985	Alberta
Ron Kapicki	Northwest Territories/Yukon	Lead	18	1987	Quebec
Neil Harrison	Ontario	Lead	18	1988	Saskatchewan
Don Harvey	Manitoba	Lead	20	1988	Northern Ontario
Don Walchuk (1)	Alberta	Second	18	1988	Northern Ontario
Louis Biron (1)	Quebec	Lead	10	1992	Alberta
Glenn Howard (1)	Ontario	Third	18	1992	Saskatchewan
Kevin Martin (1)	Alberta	Skip	10	1992	Quebec
Scott Alexander	Northwest Territories/Yukon	Lead	20	1993	Ontario
Louis Biron (2)	Quebec	Lead	20	1993	British Columbia
Peter Corner	Ontario	Lead	20	1993	Northern Ontario
John Gundy	Saskatchewan	Lead	20	1993	Newfoundland
Glenn Howard (2)	Ontario	Third	20	1993	British Columbia
Gerry Richard	British Columbia	Lead	16	1994	Saskatchewan
Kerry Burtnyk	Manitoba	Skip	14	1995	Northern Ontario
Ken Ellis	Newfoundland	Second	20	1997	New Brunswick
Pierre Charette (1)	Quebec	Third	12	1998	Newfoundland
Pierre Charette (2)	Quebec	Third	18	1999	New Brunswick
Grant Odishaw (1)	New Brunswick	Third	10	1999	Northern Ontario
Grant Odishaw (2)	New Brunswick	Lead	14	2000	Nova Scotia
Grant Odishaw (3)	New Brunswick	Lead	20	2000	Ontario
Don Walchuk (2)	Alberta	Third	16	2000	British Columbia
Wayne Middaugh (1)	Ontario	Skip	10	2001	Quebec
Wayne Middaugh (2)	Ontario	Skip	16	2001	Manitoba
Ian Tetley	Ontario	Second	16	2001	Manitoba
Brad Fenton	British Columbia	Lead	20	2004	Nova Scotia
Phil Loevenmark	Ontario	Second	12	2004	Quebec
Scott Pfeifer	Alberta	Second	12	2004	Northern Ontario
Trevor Wall	Ontario	Lead	20	2004	Prince Edward Island
Jean Gagnon	Quebec	Lead	10	2006	Prince Edward Island
Glenn Howard (3)	Ontario	Skip	14	2006	Manitoba
Craig Savill (1)	Ontario	Lead	18	2006	Northern Ontario
Pierre Fraser	New Brunswick	Lead	12	2007	Alberta
Craig Savill (2)	Ontario	Lead	10	2007	New Brunswick
Glenn Howard (4)	Ontario	Skip	12	2008	Prince Edward Island
Ryan Fry (1)	Newfoundland and Labrador	Second	14	2009	Quebec
Steve Gould	Manitoba	Lead	18	2009	Alberta
Kevin Martin (2)	Alberta	Skip	12	2009	Northern Ontario
John Morris	Alberta	Third	12	2009	British Columbia
Nolan Thiessen (1)	Alberta	Lead	18	2010	Nova Scotia
Andrew Gibson	Nova Scotia	Second	14	2011	Northwest Territories/Yukon
Ben Hebert (1)	Alberta	Lead	16	2011	Manitoba
Marc Kennedy (1)	Alberta	Second	14	2011	British Columbia
Brent Laing (1)	Ontario	Second	20	2011	Manitoba
Craig Savill (3)	Ontario	Lead	20	2011	Newfoundland and Labrador
Jeff Stoughton	Manitoba	Skip	15	2011	Alberta
Kevin Koe (1)	Alberta	Skip	14	2012	Quebec
Brent Laing (2)	Ontario	Second	16	2012	Prince Edward Island
Ryan Harnden (1)	Northern Ontario	Lead	14	2013	Alberta
Ryan Harnden (2)	Northern Ontario	Lead	17	2013	Manitoba
Ben Hebert (2)	Alberta	Lead	10	2013	Nova Scotia
Brad Jacobs	Northern Ontario	Skip	14	2013	Alberta
Marc Kennedy (2)	Alberta	Second	14	2013	Prince Edward Island
Brent Laing (3)	Ontario	Second	14	2013	New Brunswick
Mark Nichols (1)	Manitoba	Lead	16	2013	Nova Scotia
Mark Nichols (2)	Manitoba	Lead	18	2013	Northern Ontario
Philippe Ménard (1)	Quebec	Lead	16	2013	British Columbia
Craig Savill (4)	Ontario	Lead	14	2013	New Brunswick
Reid Carruthers	Manitoba	Lead	10	2014	Quebec
Jamie Childs	Northern Ontario	Lead	20	2014	Prince Edward Island
Nolan Thiessen (2)	Alberta	Lead	15	2014	Newfoundland and Labrador
Nolan Thiessen (3)	Alberta	Lead	16	2014	Northwest Territories/Yukon
Rick Sawatsky (1)	British Columbia	Lead	18	2014	Prince Edward Island
Rick Sawatsky (2)	British Columbia	Lead	16	2014	New Brunswick
Rick Sawatsky (3)	British Columbia	Lead	16	2014	Ontario
Ryan Fry (2)	Northern Ontario	Third	18	2015	Ontario
Ryan Harnden (3)	Northern Ontario	Lead	18	2015	British Columbia
Colin Hodgson (1)	Manitoba	Lead	16	2015	Northern Ontario
Brent Laing (4)	Alberta	Second	18	2015	Northern Ontario
Marc Kennedy (3)	Alberta	Third	16	2016	Prince Edward Island
Marc LeCocq	New Brunswick	Second	20	2016	Manitoba
Philippe Ménard (2)	Quebec	Lead	18	2016	Saskatchewan
Scott Howard	Ontario	Lead	18	2016	Northwest Territories
Glenn Howard (5)	Ontario	Skip	16	2016	Prince Edward Island
Nolan Thiessen (4)	Canada	Lead	20	2016	New Brunswick
E.J. Harnden (1)	Northern Ontario	Second	16	2016	Northwest Territories
Mark Nichols (3)	Newfoundland and Labrador	Third	18	2016	Canada
Denni Neufeld (1)	Manitoba	Lead	20	2016	Canada
Denni Neufeld (2)	Manitoba	Lead	17	2016	British Columbia
Kevin Koe (2)	Alberta	Skip	18	2016	Canada
Brett Gallant (1)	Newfoundland and Labrador	Second	18	2016	Prince Edward Island
Brent Laing (5)	Alberta	Second	18	2016	Newfoundland and Labrador
Geoff Walker (1)	Newfoundland and Labrador	Lead	18	2016	Alberta
Brad Gushue (1)	Newfoundland and Labrador	Skip	19	2017	Alberta
E.J. Harnden (2)	Northern Ontario	Second	16	2017	Nova Scotia
Denni Neufeld (3)	Manitoba	Lead	16	2017	Ontario
Marc Kennedy (4)	Canada	Third	22	2017	Manitoba
Brad Gushue (2)	Canada	Skip	16	2018	Yukon
Brad Gushue (3)	Canada	Skip	18	2018	Ontario
B.J. Neufeld	(Manitoba) Wild Card	Third	16	2018	Northwest Territories
Denni Neufeld (4)	(Manitoba) Wild Card	Lead	12	2018	Northern Ontario
Denni Neufeld (5)	(Manitoba) Wild Card	Lead	14	2018	Manitoba
E.J. Harnden (3)	Northern Ontario	Second	16	2019	Prince Edward Island
Wes Forget	Ontario	Second	16	2019	Northwest Territories
Brett Gallant (2)	Newfoundland and Labrador	Second	16	2020	Manitoba
Kevin Koe (3)	Canada	Skip	16	2020	New Brunswick
Brendan Bottcher (1)	Alberta	Skip	19	2020	Newfoundland and Labrador
Brendan Bottcher (2)	Alberta	Skip	15	2020	Nova Scotia
Matt Dunstone (1)	Saskatchewan	Skip	18	2020	Ontario
Matt Dunstone (2)	Saskatchewan	Skip	20	2020	Canada
Marc Kennedy (5)	Northern Ontario	Third	12	2020	Nunavut
Colin Hodgson (2)	(Manitoba) Wild Card	Lead	20	2020	Northern Ontario
Darren Moulding	Alberta	Third	16	2020	Ontario
Brad Gushue (4)	Newfoundland and Labrador	Skip	20	2020	(Manitoba) Wild Card
Brad Gushue (5)	Canada	Skip	18	2021	Ontario
John Epping	Ontario	Skip	16	2021	Nunavut
Karrick Martin (1)	Alberta	Lead	16	2021	Yukon
Brad Gushue (6)	Canada	Skip	16	2021	Nunavut
Braeden Moskowy	Saskatchewan	Third	16	2021	Manitoba
Karrick Martin (2)	Canada	Lead	20	2022	Ontario
Mark Nichols (4)	(Newfoundland and Labrador) Wild Card 1	Third	16	2022	Nunavut
Dan Marsh (1)	Saskatchewan	Lead	16	2022	Yukon
Ben Hebert (3)	(Alberta) Wild Card 1	Lead	14	2023	Prince Edward Island
Colin Hodgson (3)	Northern Ontario	Lead	20	2023	(Alberta) Wild Card 1
Andy McCann	New Brunswick	Lead	16	2024	Northern Ontario
Ben Hebert (4)	Alberta (Bottcher)	Lead	18	2024	Yukon
Ben Hebert (5)	Alberta (Bottcher)	Lead	16	2024	Ontario
Brett Gallant (3)	Alberta (Bottcher)	Second	16	2024	Ontario
Geoff Walker (2)	Canada	Lead	16	2024	Prince Edward Island
Brad Gushue (7)	Canada	Skip	16	2024	Prince Edward Island
Tim March	Ontario	Lead	22	2024	Manitoba (Dunstone)
Ryan Harnden (4)	Manitoba (Dunstone)	Lead	14	2024	Newfoundland and Labrador
Stephen Trickett	Newfoundland and Labrador	Second	16	2024	Manitoba (Dunstone)
Geoff Walker (3)	Canada	Lead	20	2024	Manitoba (Carruthers)
Dan Marsh (2)	Saskatchewan	Lead	17	2024	Alberta (Bottcher)
Dan Marsh (3)	Saskatchewan	Lead	18	2024	Canada
Scott Mitchell	Ontario	Second	16	2025	Northwest Territories
Connor Njegovan	Manitoba (Carruthers)	Lead	16	2025	Canada
Trevor Johnson	Saskatchewan (Kleiter)	Lead	20	2025	Alberta (Jacobs)
Brendan Bottcher (3)	Canada	Second	16	2025	Nunavut
Ian McMillan	Northern Ontario	Lead	16	2025	Nunavut
Ryan Abraham	Nova Scotia	Lead	20	2025	Alberta (Jacobs)
Matt Dunstone (3)	Manitoba (Dunstone)	Skip	20	2026	Manitoba (Calvert)
Colton Lott	Manitoba (Dunstone)	Third	16	2026	Northern Ontario
Matt Dunstone (4)	Manitoba (Dunstone)	Skip	15	2026	Northern Ontario

=== Number of games played ===
As of the 2026 Brier

Rank	Player	Team(s) / Province(s)	Games played
1	Brad Gushue	Newfoundland and Labrador; Canada; Wild Card 1 Newfoundland and Labrador (Gushue)	279
2	Mark Nichols	Newfoundland and Labrador; Manitoba; Canada; Wild Card 1 Newfoundland and Labrador (Gushue)	266
3	Glenn Howard	Ontario; Wild Card 3	227
4	Ben Hebert	Saskatchewan; Alberta; Canada; Wild Card 2 Wild Card 1 Alberta (Bottcher); Alberta (Jacobs)	218
5	E.J. Harnden	Northern Ontario; Canada; Manitoba (Dunstone)	205
6	Ryan Harnden	Northern Ontario; Manitoba; Manitoba (Dunstone)	202
7	Brad Jacobs	Northern Ontario; Manitoba; Alberta (Jacobs); Canada	200
8	Brent Laing	Ontario; Alberta; Canada; Saskatchewan (McEwen)	198
9	Marc Kennedy	Alberta; Canada; Northern Ontario; Wild Card 1 Alberta (Bottcher); Alberta (Jacobs)	183
10	Geoff Walker	Newfoundland and Labrador; Canada; Wild Card 1 Newfoundland and Labrador (Gushue)	182
10	James Grattan	New Brunswick	182
12	Ryan Fry	Manitoba; Newfoundland and Labrador; Northern Ontario; Ontario	177
12	Jamie Koe	Northwest Territories/Yukon; Northwest Territories	177
14	Brett Gallant	Newfoundland and Labrador; Canada; Wild Card 1 Wild Card 1 Alberta (Bottcher); Alberta (Jacobs)	175
15	Russ Howard	Ontario; New Brunswick	174
16	Kevin Koe	Alberta; Canada; Wild Card 2 Alberta (Koe)	166
17	Brad Chorostkowski	Northwest Territories/Yukon; Northwest Territories	150
17	Kevin Martin	Alberta	150
17	John Morris	Ontario; Alberta; British Columbia; Canada; Wild Card 2	150
20	Jeff Stoughton	Manitoba	139
21	Éric Sylvain	Quebec	137
22	Jean-Michel Ménard	Quebec	135
23	Brendan Bottcher	Alberta; Wildcard; Canada; Wild Card 1 Alberta (Bottcher); Newfoundland and Labrador (Gushue)	134
24	Reid Carruthers	Manitoba; Wild Card; Wild Card 1 Wild Card 2	130
25	Bernie Sparkes	Alberta; British Columbia	129
26	Martin Crête	Quebec	128
26	Wayne Middaugh	Ontario; Wild Card 3	127
28	Rick Lang	Northern Ontario	121
28	Craig Savill	Ontario	121
30	Pat Ryan	Alberta; British Columbia	120
30	Ed Werenich	Ontario	120
30	Mike McEwen	Manitoba; Wild Card; Wild Card 1 Ontario; Saskatchewan; Saskatchewan (McEwen)	120
33	B.J. Neufeld	Manitoba; Wildcard; Alberta; Canada; Wild Card 2 Manitoba (Dunstone)	119
34	Mark O'Rourke	Prince Edward Island	118
35	Karrick Martin	Alberta; Wildcard; Canada; Alberta (Koe)	116
36	Pat Simmons	Saskatchewan; Alberta; Canada	112
37	Jim Cotter	British Columbia	107
37	Steve Laycock	Saskatchewan; British Columbia	107
39	Rick Sawatsky	British Columbia	106
39	Al Hackner	Northern Ontario	106
41	Paul Flemming	Nova Scotia	104
42	Richard Hart	Ontario	103
42	Adam Casey	Newfoundland and Labrador; Prince Edward Island; Saskatchewan; Manitoba; Wild Card 3 Canada; Newfoundland and Labrador (Gushue)	103
42	Colton Flasch	Saskatchewan; Alberta; Canada; Saskatchewan (McEwen)	103
45	Derek Samagalski	Manitoba; Wild Card; Wild Card 1 Wild Card #2; Nunavut	102
46	Garnet Campbell	Saskatchewan	101
47	Randy Ferbey	Alberta	100
47	Peter Gallant	Prince Edward Island	100

== See also ==
- Scottish Men's Curling Championship
- United States Men's Curling Championship
- World Curling Championships
- Scotties Tournament of Hearts (Canada)
- Scottish Women's Curling Championship
