= Toronto at the Macdonald Brier =

Toronto was represented at the Macdonald Brier (now called the Montana's Brier), Canada's national men's curling championship with a separate entry from 1927 to 1931.

From 1927 to 1929, Toronto was represented by winners of the Canada Life Trophy, while in 1930 and 1931, it was represented by winners of the Grand Aggregate of the Toronto Bonspiel. In 1932, winners of these events entered a playoff with the winners of the Ontario Tankard (today known as the Silver Tankard) to determine southern Ontario's representative at the Brier, while in 1933 the winner of the Toronto Bonspiel played the winner of the Ontario Tankard to represent Ontario. The Ontario Tankard would be the sole provincial championship until a separate event sponsored by British Consols Cigarettes was created in 1938. Prior to 1932, Toronto and southern Ontario had separate representatives at the Brier, with (southern) Ontario being represented by the winner of the Ontario Tankard.

Teams did not have to represent clubs in the city to represent it at the Brier. Indeed, two of the five rinks to represent Toronto came from clubs outside the city. Paradoxically, the 1931 Brier's Ontario representative was from a Toronto club, while Toronto's representative was from Barrie.

== Playdowns ==
=== 1927 ===
The High Park Club rink of Bill Scott, Dr. E. A. Peaker, F. J. Lucas and T. Wright defeated the Queen City Curling Club rink of E. H. Brower, Dr. V. McWilliams, Dr. G. E. Gilfillan, and F. W. Warren 14–11 in the Canada Life Gold Cup final.

Team	1	2	3	4	5	6	7	8	9	10	11	12	13	14	Final
Scott (High Park)	2	2	0	1	0	1	0	1	3	0	0	0	1	3	14
Brower (Queen City)	0	0	3	0	2	0	2	0	0	2	1	1	0	0	11

=== 1928 ===
The Lakeview rink of Charlie Snow, Harvey Sproule, Tommy Dale and Stuart Graham defeated the Granite Club rink of Dr. Vic McWilliams, Jack Brandon, Dr. Gifillan and H. Clark 16–12 to win the second edition of the Canada Life trophy.

Team	1	2	3	4	5	6	7	8	9	10	11	12	13	14	Final
Snow (Lakeview)	0	1	0	4	2	1	1	0	1	0	2	4	0	0	16
McWilliams (Granite)	2	0	1	0	0	0	0	1	0	2	0	0	4	2	12

=== 1929 ===
The Granite Club rink of Eddie Brower, J. Brower, S. Beaty and H. Howard defeated the Toronto Curling Club rink of Hubert Chisholm, Ed Allan, H. Macdonald and H. E. Taylor 15–11 to win the Canada Life trophy.

Team	1	2	3	4	5	6	7	8	9	10	11	12	13	14	Final
Brower (Granite)	0	2	0	0	1	0	3	1	2	1	1	2	0	2	15
Chisholm (Toronto)	1	0	3	3	0	1	0	0	0	0	0	0	3	0	11

=== 1930 ===
The Kitchener rink of R. G. Hall, L. L. Cooke, P. G. Hall and J. B. English won the Grand Aggregate of the third annual Toronto Bonspiel after winning the event's Wrigley Trophy, defeating Ross Harstone of Hamilton 11–10 in an extra end in the process. The team finished the event with a 17–3 record, and dropped out of the competition after clinching the grand aggregate. The 1930 Brier would start just three days later.

=== 1931 ===
The rink of Sam Meredith, Doc Simon, Fred Simon and C. H. Bulley of Barrie won the Toronto Bonspiel's Grand Aggregate as well as the Ryrie-Birks trophy. The team won 11 games in the tournament, and won the Ryrie-Birks trophy by defeating D. B. Carlyle of Oshawa 13–8. The Dave Walker rink from Fort William were second place in the running for the Grand Aggregate, though would not have been eligible to represent Toronto at the Brier, as they were from Northern Ontario. They had a record of 10–2. Walker ended up winning the Royal York trophy (the bonspiel's actual championship trophy) for the second straight year, defeating the Toronto Victoria club's H. H. Chisholm. Chisholm also finished the tournament with 10 wins.

== Representatives ==
Brier	Winning Team	Winning Club	City	Brier Record
1927	Bill Scott, Edward A. Peaker, T. Wright, Frederick J. Lucas	High Park	Toronto	4–3 (3rd)
1928	Charlie Snow, Harvey Sproule, T. Stuart Graham, T. Dale	Lakeview CC	Toronto	7–4 (3rd)
1929	E. H. Brower, Jack Brower, J. S. Beatty, Harry Howard	The Granite Club	Toronto	6–3 (T3rd)
1930	R. G. Hall, L. L. Cooke, Perry G. Hall, J. B. English	Kitchener Granite CC	Kitchener	5–4 (3rd)
1931	Sam Meredith, A. D. Simon, C. H. Beelby, A. J. Simon	Barrie CC	Barrie	6–4 (3rd)
