= 1929 Macdonald Brier =

Canadian men's curling championship

- Host city: Toronto, Ontario
- Arena: Granite Curling Club
- Dates: February 26–March 1
- Winner: Manitoba
- Curling club: Strathcona CC, Winnipeg
- Skip: Gordon Hudson
- Third: Don Rollo
- Second: Ron Singbush
- Lead: Bill Grant

The 1929 Macdonald Brier, the Canadian men's national curling championship, was held from February 26 to March 1, 1929 at the Granite Club in Toronto, Ontario.

Team Manitoba won their second consecutive Briar Tankard with Gordon Hudson as skip finishing round robin play undefeated. This was the first time a team went unbeaten in a single Brier. Hudson also became the first skip to win back-to-back Brier championships.

== Teams ==
The teams are listed as follows:

Alberta	Manitoba	Montreal	New Brunswick	Northern Ontario
Edmonton CC, Edmonton Skip: Arnold Johnson; Third: Charlie Cairns; Second: Stewart Williams; Lead: Jack Hays	Strathcona CC, Winnipeg Skip: Gordon Hudson; Third: Don Rollo; Second: Ron Singbusch; Lead: Bill Grant	Thistle CC, Montreal Skip: George Kent; Third: David O'Meara; Second: Bill McLuckie; Lead: William C. Hodgson	Moncton CA, Moncton Skip: Wendell MacDonald; Third: Fred McAndrews; Second: Ambrose Wheeler; Lead: Harold Lockhart	Chapleau CC, Chapleau Skip: George Nicholson; Third: Thomas Godfrey; Second: Frank Hamlin; Lead: William Thompson
Nova Scotia	Ontario	Quebec	Saskatchewan	Toronto
Halifax CC, Halifax Skip: H. St. Clair Silver; Third: Al MacInnes; Second: Jim Donahoe; Lead: L.E. Sievert	Lindsay CC, Lindsay Skip: Frank Carew; Third: Walter Reesor; Second: Frank Williams; Lead: Dick Butler	Victoria CC, Quebec City Skip: Archie Bell; Third: A.A. Fleming; Second: H. Huestis; Lead: E.E. Turner	Regina CC, Regina Skip: Dick Ross; Third: Ash Parkinson; Second: Alex Smith; Lead: Walter Nesbitt	The Granite Club, Toronto Skip: Ed Brower; Third: Jack Brower; Second: Stanley Beatty; Lead: Harry Howard

== Map of teams ==
Provincial Winners

== Round Robin standings ==
Key
Brier champion

Team	Skip	W	L	PF	PA
Manitoba	Gordon Hudson	9	0	120	54
Saskatchewan	Dick Ross	7	2	110	85
Toronto	Ed Brower	6	3	109	85
New Brunswick	Wendell MacDonald	6	3	98	86
Northern Ontario	George Nicholson	5	4	79	104
Ontario	Frank Carew	4	5	91	91
Quebec	Archie Bell	3	6	79	94
Alberta	Arnold Johnson	2	7	82	109
Nova Scotia	H. St. Clair Silver	2	7	96	102
Montreal	George Kent	1	8	64	123

== Round Robin results ==
=== Draw 1 ===
Sheet A	1	2	3	4	5	6	7	8	9	10	11	12	Final
Manitoba (Hudson)	0	0	3	0	1	1	0	1	0	3	0	3	12
Toronto (Brower)	2	1	0	2	0	0	2	0	1	0	1	0	9

Sheet B	1	2	3	4	5	6	7	8	9	10	11	12	Final
New Brunswick (MacDonald)	1	0	0	1	1	0	5	1	1	0	0	0	10
Nova Scotia (Silver)	0	1	2	0	0	1	0	0	0	1	2	1	8

Sheet C	1	2	3	4	5	6	7	8	9	10	11	12	Final
Northern Ontario (Nicholson)	1	5	2	0	2	0	1	0	3	0	1	0	15
Quebec (Bell)	0	0	0	1	0	2	0	2	0	1	0	1	7

Sheet D	1	2	3	4	5	6	7	8	9	10	11	12	13	Final
Alberta (Johnson)	0	0	3	3	2	0	0	1	0	0	1	0	1	11
Montreal (Kent)	1	1	0	0	0	1	1	0	1	2	0	3	0	10

Sheet E	1	2	3	4	5	6	7	8	9	10	11	12	Final
Saskatchewan (Ross)	1	3	0	1	2	3	0	1	1	2	0	0	14
Ontario (Carew)	0	0	2	0	0	0	4	0	0	0	0	2	8

=== Draw 2 ===
Sheet A	1	2	3	4	5	6	7	8	9	10	11	12	Final
Manitoba (Hudson)	2	2	0	1	0	4	0	3	0	1	0	0	13
Quebec (Bell)	0	0	2	0	1	0	1	0	1	0	1	1	7

Sheet B	1	2	3	4	5	6	7	8	9	10	11	12	Final
New Brunswick (MacDonald)	5	3	0	3	0	0	1	1	0	2	0	0	15
Saskatchewan (Ross)	0	0	1	0	1	2	0	0	3	0	1	3	11

Sheet C	1	2	3	4	5	6	7	8	9	10	11	12	Final
Northern Ontario (Nicholson)	2	0	4	0	2	0	3	0	0	1	0	1	13
Alberta (Johnson)	0	1	0	3	0	1	0	1	2	0	3	0	11

Sheet D	1	2	3	4	5	6	7	8	9	10	11	12	Final
Nova Scotia (Silver)	1	3	1	2	1	0	1	2	4	3	2	0	20
Montreal (Kent)	0	0	0	0	0	1	0	0	0	0	0	2	3

Sheet E	1	2	3	4	5	6	7	8	9	10	11	12	Final
Toronto (Brower)	1	1	0	0	0	2	1	2	0	1	0	2	10
Ontario (Carew)	0	0	0	3	1	0	0	0	3	0	2	0	9

=== Draw 3 ===
Sheet A	1	2	3	4	5	6	7	8	9	10	11	12	Final
Toronto (Brower)	3	0	1	0	0	4	0	2	1	2	0	1	14
Alberta (Johnson)	0	4	0	2	1	0	1	0	0	0	5	0	13

Sheet B	1	2	3	4	5	6	7	8	9	10	11	12	Final
Northern Ontario (Nicholson)	0	0	0	2	4	5	0	0	0	1	0	1	13
Nova Scotia (Silver)	1	1	1	0	0	0	2	2	2	0	1	0	10

Sheet C	1	2	3	4	5	6	7	8	9	10	11	12	Final
Ontario (Carew)	0	1	1	0	3	1	0	2	0	2	1	1	12
Quebec (Bell)	2	0	0	2	0	0	1	0	2	0	0	0	7

Sheet D	1	2	3	4	5	6	7	8	9	10	11	12	Final
Saskatchewan (Ross)	3	0	3	4	0	0	1	0	0	0	2	1	14
Montreal (Kent)	0	2	0	0	1	1	0	3	2	1	0	0	10

Sheet E	1	2	3	4	5	6	7	8	9	10	11	12	Final
Manitoba (Hudson)	1	1	1	2	0	1	0	1	0	0	4	0	11
New Brunswick (MacDonald)	0	0	0	0	2	0	1	0	0	1	0	1	5

=== Draw 4 ===
Sheet A	1	2	3	4	5	6	7	8	9	10	11	12	Final
Manitoba (Hudson)	0	1	5	0	1	0	2	2	1	1	0	1	14
Ontario (Carew)	1	0	0	2	0	1	0	0	0	0	1	0	5

Sheet B	1	2	3	4	5	6	7	8	9	10	11	12	Final
Toronto (Brower)	1	3	0	3	0	2	3	2	3	0	X	X	17
Northern Ontario (Nicholson)	0	0	2	0	1	0	0	0	0	1	X	X	4

Sheet C	1	2	3	4	5	6	7	8	9	10	11	12	Final
New Brunswick (MacDonald)	1	1	3	0	1	0	1	3	2	1	4	X	17
Montreal (Kent)	0	0	0	1	0	1	0	0	0	0	0	X	2

Sheet D	1	2	3	4	5	6	7	8	9	10	11	12	Final
Saskatchewan (Ross)	0	4	0	4	0	2	2	0	0	0	4	0	16
Nova Scotia (Silver)	3	0	1	0	3	0	0	1	1	1	0	2	12

Sheet E	1	2	3	4	5	6	7	8	9	10	11	12	Final
Quebec (Bell)	2	1	1	0	2	0	0	2	0	1	1	X	10
Alberta (Johnson)	0	0	0	1	0	1	1	0	1	0	0	X	4

=== Draw 5 ===
Sheet A	1	2	3	4	5	6	7	8	9	10	11	12	Final
Manitoba (Hudson)	0	3	0	3	2	5	2	0	1	0	X	X	16
Northern Ontario (Nicholson)	1	0	1	0	0	0	0	1	0	5	X	X	8

Sheet B	1	2	3	4	5	6	7	8	9	10	11	12	Final
Saskatchewan (Ross)	0	1	0	1	0	1	0	2	0	2	1	2	10
Quebec (Bell)	1	0	2	0	1	0	2	0	1	0	0	0	7

Sheet C	1	2	3	4	5	6	7	8	9	10	11	12	Final
Ontario (Carew)	1	1	1	0	2	0	3	1	1	2	3	0	15
Montreal (Kent)	0	0	0	2	0	1	0	0	0	0	0	4	7

Sheet D	1	2	3	4	5	6	7	8	9	10	11	12	Final
Toronto (Brower)	2	3	0	0	1	0	1	1	0	2	1	0	11
Nova Scotia (Silver)	0	0	2	1	0	1	0	0	1	0	0	1	6

Sheet E	1	2	3	4	5	6	7	8	9	10	11	12	Final
New Brunswick (MacDonald)	0	2	3	1	0	2	0	1	0	0	3	0	12
Alberta (Johnson)	4	0	0	0	1	0	2	0	1	1	0	1	10

=== Draw 6 ===
Sheet A	1	2	3	4	5	6	7	8	9	10	11	12	Final
Nova Scotia (Silver)	1	0	0	0	2	0	0	0	1	0	0	X	4
Manitoba (Hudson)	0	5	1	2	0	2	1	1	0	0	0	X	12

Sheet B	1	2	3	4	5	6	7	8	9	10	11	12	Final
Northern Ontario (Nicholson)	2	3	1	1	1	0	2	1	0	0	0	0	11
Montreal (Kent)	0	0	0	0	0	1	0	0	1	0	2	2	6

Sheet C	1	2	3	4	5	6	7	8	9	10	11	12	Final
Quebec (Bell)	0	1	0	0	0	0	0	0	3	0	1	2	7
Toronto (Brower)	0	0	4	2	0	0	2	2	0	4	0	0	14

Sheet D	1	2	3	4	5	6	7	8	9	10	11	12	Final
Ontario (Carew)	5	2	1	0	1	0	0	2	1	0	1	1	14
New Brunswick (MacDonald)	0	0	0	1	0	1	1	0	0	1	0	0	4

Sheet E	1	2	3	4	5	6	7	8	9	10	11	12	Final
Saskatchewan (Ross)	3	0	0	0	3	0	1	0	1	0	0	2	10
Alberta (Johnson)	0	2	1	1	0	1	0	1	0	1	2	0	9

=== Draw 7 ===
Sheet A	1	2	3	4	5	6	7	8	9	10	11	12	Final
Manitoba (Hudson)	1	1	0	2	4	2	2	0	0	1	0	1	14
Montreal (Kent)	0	0	2	0	0	0	0	1	2	0	1	0	6

Sheet B	1	2	3	4	5	6	7	8	9	10	11	12	Final
Saskatchewan (Ross)	3	3	1	1	0	1	4	0	1	1	X	X	15
Northern Ontario (Nicholson)	0	0	0	0	1	0	0	1	0	0	X	X	2

Sheet C	1	2	3	4	5	6	7	8	9	10	11	12	Final
Quebec (Bell)	1	0	0	0	3	0	3	1	0	2	3	0	13
Nova Scotia (Silver)	0	1	1	2	0	2	0	0	2	0	0	1	9

Sheet D	1	2	3	4	5	6	7	8	9	10	11	12	Final
Ontario (Carew)	3	0	1	0	0	0	3	0	1	1	1	2	12
Alberta (Johnson)	0	3	0	1	1	1	0	2	0	0	0	0	8

Sheet E	1	2	3	4	5	6	7	8	9	10	11	12	Final
Toronto (Brower)	0	1	1	0	7	0	0	0	3	0	3	1	16
New Brunswick (MacDonald)	2	0	0	1	0	2	0	2	0	2	0	0	9

=== Draw 8 ===
Sheet A	1	2	3	4	5	6	7	8	9	10	11	12	Final
Quebec (Bell)	0	1	1	0	2	0	2	0	1	2	1	1	11
Montreal (Kent)	3	0	0	1	0	1	0	1	0	0	0	0	6

Sheet B	1	2	3	4	5	6	7	8	9	10	11	12	Final
New Brunswick (MacDonald)	3	0	2	0	2	0	3	2	2	1	X	X	15
Northern Ontario (Nicholson)	0	1	0	2	0	1	0	0	0	0	X	X	4

Sheet C	1	2	3	4	5	6	7	8	9	10	11	12	Final
Saskatchewan (Ross)	2	3	0	0	0	0	1	3	0	2	0	0	11
Toronto (Brower)	0	0	1	3	0	1	0	0	1	0	1	1	8

Sheet D	1	2	3	4	5	6	7	8	9	10	11	12	Final
Manitoba (Hudson)	4	1	0	4	2	3	X	X	X	X	X	X	14
Alberta (Johnson)	0	0	1	0	0	0	X	X	X	X	X	X	1

Sheet E	1	2	3	4	5	6	7	8	9	10	11	12	Final
Nova Scotia (Silver)	2	2	0	2	0	2	0	2	2	0	1	0	13
Ontario (Carew)	0	0	1	0	2	0	3	0	0	2	0	1	9

=== Draw 9 ===
Sheet A	1	2	3	4	5	6	7	8	9	10	11	12	Final
Saskatchewan (Ross)	1	0	2	0	3	0	1	0	1	0	1	0	9
Manitoba (Hudson)	0	3	0	1	0	2	0	2	0	4	0	2	14

Sheet B	1	2	3	4	5	6	7	8	9	10	11	12	Final
Alberta (Johnson)	0	0	2	1	1	0	5	0	0	2	0	4	15
Nova Scotia (Silver)	5	2	0	0	0	1	0	1	2	0	3	0	14

Sheet C	1	2	3	4	5	6	7	8	9	10	11	12	Final
Toronto (Brower)	2	2	0	0	1	0	3	0	0	1	1	0	10
Montreal (Kent)	0	0	3	1	0	2	0	2	1	0	0	5	14

Sheet D	1	2	3	4	5	6	7	8	9	10	11	12	Final
Northern Ontario (Nicholson)	0	0	0	1	0	0	2	2	1	1	2	0	9
Ontario (Carew)	1	1	1	0	1	1	0	0	0	0	0	2	7

Sheet E	1	2	3	4	5	6	7	8	9	10	11	12	Final
New Brunswick (MacDonald)	1	0	0	1	0	2	0	1	0	2	0	4	11
Quebec (Bell)	0	1	3	0	2	0	1	0	1	0	2	0	10
