= Ross Harstone =

Canadian curler (1885–1964)

Ross Gerald Lewis Harstone (June 11, 1885 – May 11, 1964) was a Canadian curler who is the namesake of The Brier's Ross Harstone Sportsmanship Award, which is presented to the curler who best represents the ideals of good sportsmanship, observance of the rules, exemplary conduct, and curling ability.

== Early life ==
Harstone was born on June 11, 1885 in Seaforth, Ontario. He attended public schools in Lindsay, Ontario and graduated from Lindsay Collegiate and Vocational Institute and the University of Toronto. He later moved to St. Peter's, Nova Scotia, where he worked in railroad construction. On November 14, 1917, he married Josephine Matheson in St. Peter's. They had one son. During World War I, Harstone served as a lieutenant in the Canadian Railway Troops in France and Belgium. After the War, he moved to Hamilton, Ontario.

== Business and government posts ==
Harstone was president of National Cut Stone, vice president of Canada Crushed Stone, and a director of Tomlinson Construction Co.

A member of the Ontario Liberal Party, Harstone served on the Hamilton Harbour Commission, Niagara Parks Commission, and Niagara Falls Bridge Commission. He was a member of the Niagara Falls Bridge Commission when it controversially chose to inscribe "to God's glory and in grateful memory of our nations' leaders Winston Churchill and Franklin D. Roosevelt" on a bell in the Rainbow Tower, which was seen as an affront to Canadian prime minister William Lyon Mackenzie King. Commission chairman A. J. Haines placed the blame for the inscription on commissioner Thomas McQuesten and wrote a letter to federal Transport Minister Lionel Chevrier recording his and Hartstone's "extreme indignation" over the inscription. As a result of the controversy, Ontario premier George A. Drew dismissed all of the province's representatives to the board.

== Curling ==
Harstone was a member of the Lindsay, Granite, and Thistle curling clubs. His rink was runner up to the Kitchener Granite CC for the Wrigley Trophy in 1930, which was part of the Toronto Bonspiel, a tournament that determined Toronto's entry in The Brier that year. He was elected president of the Ontario Curling Association in 1936. From 1939 to 1940, he was president of the Dominion Curling Association. In 1952, he was appointed to the Brier Tankard's board of trustees. On May 11, 1964, he collapsed shortly after giving a speech at a meeting of the Ontario Curling Association executive and was pronounced dead on arrival at the hospital.

In 1967, George MacCharles of Newfoundland became the first recipient of The Brier's Ross Harstone Memorial Award, given to the "curler who exemplifies both ability and sportsmanship", for his performance in the previous year's championship. Harstone was inducted into the Canadian Curling Hall of Fame in 1974.
