= Charlie Scrymgeour =

Canadian curler

- Curler
- Born: June 15, 1914
- Died: November 24, 2000 (aged 86); Winnipeg, Manitoba
Medal record
Representing Manitoba
Macdonald Brier
Gold medal – first place	1942 Quebec City

Charles Harold Scrymgeour (June 15, 1914 – November 24, 2000) was a Canadian curler from Winnipeg, Manitoba. He was the second of the 1942 Brier Champion team (skipped by Ken Watson), representing Manitoba.
