= Gordon Hudson (curler) =

Canadian curler

- Curler
- Born: January 5, 1894; Rat Portage, Ontario, Canada
- Died: July 10, 1959 (aged 65); Winnipeg, Manitoba, Canada

Curling career
- Member Association: Manitoba
Medal record
Representing Manitoba
Macdonald Brier
Gold medal – first place	1928 Toronto
Gold medal – first place	1929 Toronto

Gordon Milford Hudson (January 5, 1894 – July 10, 1959) was a Canadian curler. He was a two-time Brier champion.

Hudson was the first skip to win two Briers, which he won back to back in 1928 and 1929. Hudson grew up in Kenora, Ontario, and participated in many Manitoba Curling Association Bonspiels. In 1916, his family moved to Winnipeg. Hudson fought in World War I, and then joined the now defunct Strathcona Curling Club. In 1928, he won his first Brier. His Manitoba team, which also included Sam Penwarden, Ron Singbush and Bill Grant finished the round robin with a 7-2 record, tied with Alberta and Toronto. In a special tie-breaker, Hudson's rink defeated Alberta 10-7 and Toronto 12-6 to claim the first Brier title for the province. At the 1929 Brier, Hudson and his Manitoba rink (which now included Don Rollo in place of Penwarden) went undefeated, finishing with a 9-0 record, giving him his second Brier title.

From 1949 to 1950, he served as president of the Dominion Curling Association. Hudson's son, Bruce Hudson was also an accomplished curler.

In 1985 Gordon Hudson was inducted into the Manitoba Sports Hall of Fame.
