= Don Rollo =

Canadian curler

- Curler
- Born: March 11, 1887; London, England
- Died: April 13, 1948 (aged 61); Winnipeg, Manitoba, Canada
Medal record
Representing Manitoba
Macdonald Brier
Gold medal – first place	1929 Toronto

Donald John Rollo (March 11, 1887 – April 13, 1948) was a Canadian curler. He was the third of the 1929 Brier Champion team (skipped by Gordon Hudson), representing Manitoba.
