= Ron Singbush =

Canadian curler

- Curler
- Born: December 17, 1896; Winnipeg, Manitoba
- Died: December 29, 1950 (aged 54); Winnipeg, Manitoba
Medal record
Representing Manitoba
Macdonald Brier
Gold medal – first place	1928 Toronto
Gold medal – first place	1929 Toronto

Ronald Singbush (December 17, 1896 – December 29, 1950) was a Canadian curler. He was the second of the 1928 and 1929 Brier Champion teams (skipped by Gordon Hudson), representing Manitoba.
