= Jim Pettapiece =

Canadian curler

- Curler
- Born: May 7, 1937; Saskatchewan, Canada
- Died: December 19, 2016 (aged 78–79); Vancouver, British Columbia, Canada
Medal record
Men's curling
Representing Canada
World Championships
Gold medal – first place	1970 Utica
Gold medal – first place	1971 Megève
Representing Manitoba
Macdonald Brier
Gold medal – first place	1970 Winnipeg
Gold medal – first place	1971 Quebec City

James K. Pettapiece (May 7, 1937 – December 19, 2016) was a Canadian curler. He was the second on the Don Duguid rink that won two Curling Championships and two Brier Championships in 1970 and 1971. Pettapiece also played in the 1973 Macdonald Brier playing second for the Danny Fink rink, finishing with a 4–6 record. He was inducted into the Canadian Curling Hall of Fame in 1974, and into the Manitoba Sports Hall of Fame in 1981. He died in Vancouver in 2016 following a two-month struggle with cancer.
