= Doug Armstrong (curler) =

Canadian curler

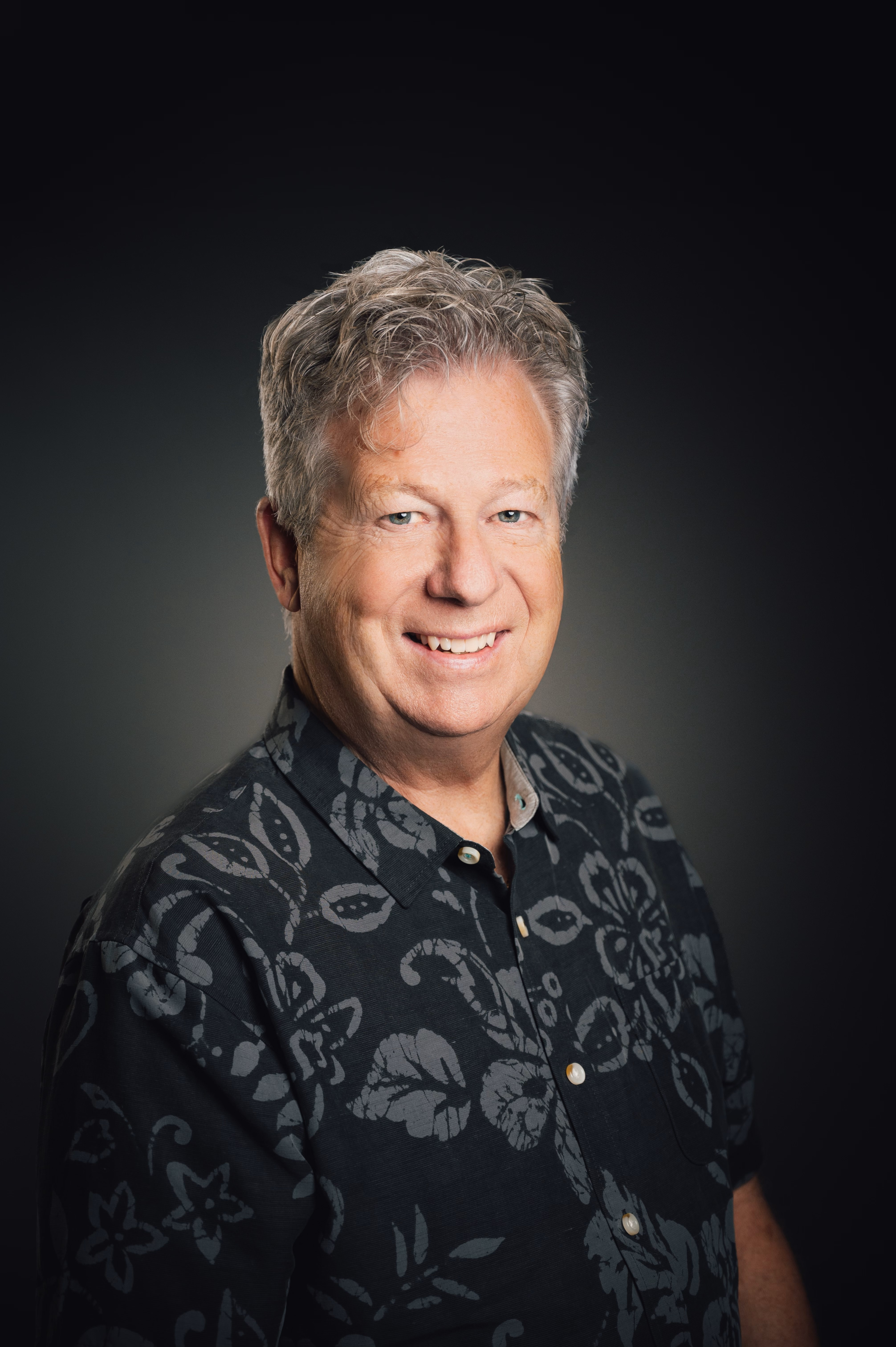
Doug Armstrong

Doug Armstrong is a Canadian curler. Between 1998 and 2002, he was the lead on skipper Jeff Stoughton's team for four seasons. He played in three Briers as a member of the team, including winning the 1999 Labatt Brier. His team went 10–3 at the event, and defeated Guy Hemmings of Quebec in the final. He won a silver medal at the 1999 Ford World Men's Curling Championship.

As a result of his successes, on May 2, 2010, Armstrong and the rest of the 1999 Brier Champion team was inducted into the Manitoba Curling Hall of Fame.

He is the son of 1978 Canadian women's champion Iris Armstrong.

== Teams ==
Season	Skip	Third	Second	Lead	Alternate	Coach	Events
1995–96	Dale Duguid	Dan Carey	Russ Hayes	Doug Armstrong			
1996–97	Dale Duguid	James Kirkness	David Nedohin	Doug Armstrong			
1997–98	Dale Duguid	James Kirkness	Jim Spencer	Doug Armstrong	Barry Fry		1998 Brier (bronze)
1998–99	Jeff Stoughton	Jon Mead	Garry Van Den Berghe	Doug Armstrong	Steve Gould	Jim Waite	1999 Brier (gold); WCC 1999 (silver)
1999–00	Jeff Stoughton	Jon Mead	Garry Van Den Berghe	Doug Armstrong	Darryl Gunnlaugson		2000 Brier (4th)
2000–01	Jeff Stoughton	Jon Mead	Garry Van Den Berghe	Doug Armstrong			
2001–02	Jeff Stoughton	Jon Mead	Garry Van Den Berghe	Doug Armstrong	Jim Spencer		2001 COCT (6th)
