= Bill Grant (curler) =

Canadian curler

- Curler
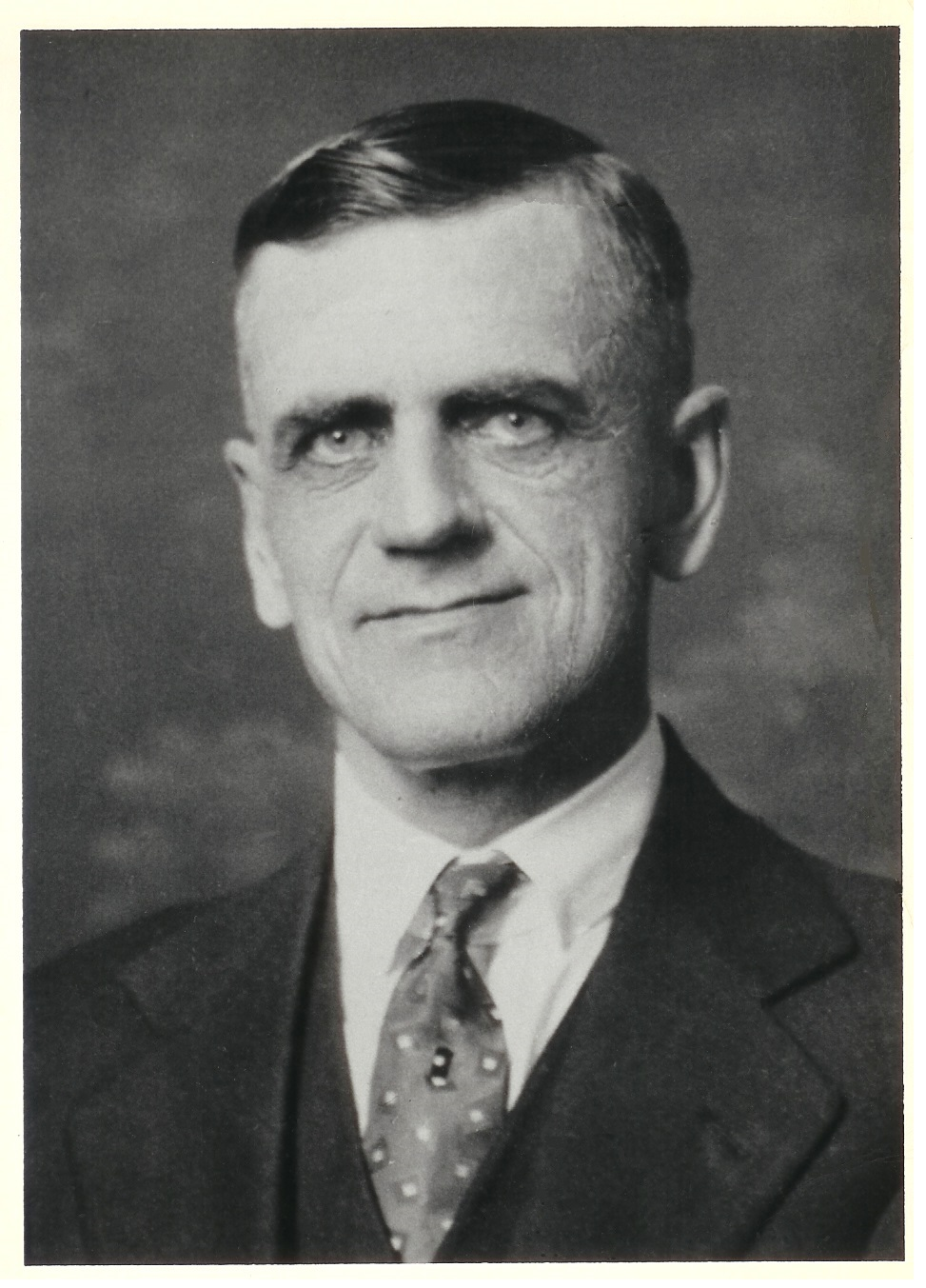
- Born: June 16, 1882; Ingersoll, Ontario
- Died: April 16, 1942 (aged 59); Winnipeg, Manitoba

Team
- Curling club: Strathcona Curling Club

Curling career
- Brier: 2
Medal record
Representing Manitoba
Macdonald Brier
| Gold medal – first place | 1928 Toronto |
| Gold medal – first place | 1929 Toronto |

William Alexander Grant (June 16, 1882 – April 16, 1942) was a Canadian curler. He was the lead of the 1928 and 1929 Brier Champion teams (skipped by Gordon Hudson), representing Manitoba. Grant was a 1975 inductee to the Canadian Curling Hall of Fame. He died suddenly in 1942 while attending a curling meeting at the Fort Rouge Curling Club.

Grant was married twice and had two children with his second wife Doris, Thomas Alexander Grant (1928-2002) and Barbara Longworth née:Grant (1931-2020).

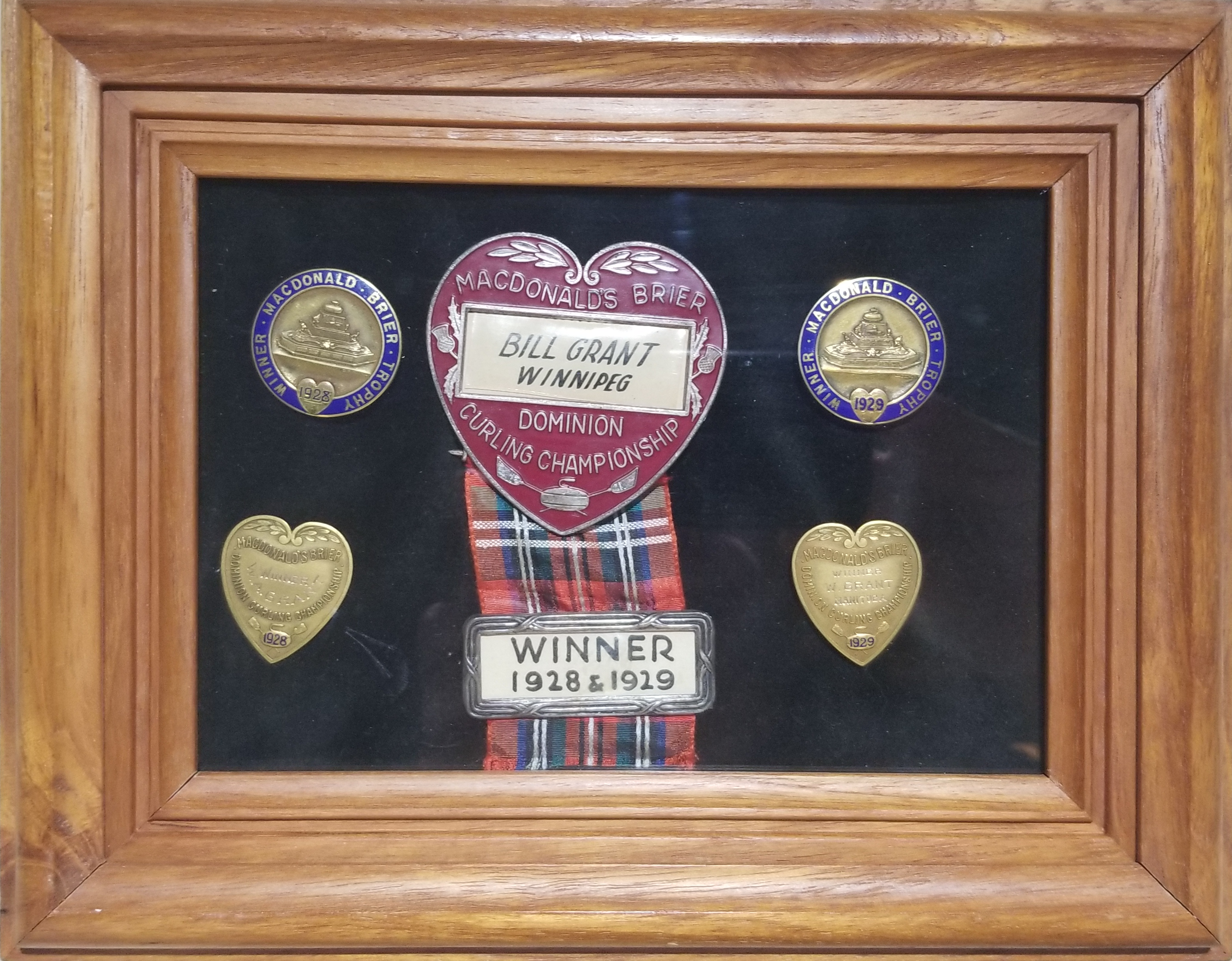
1928 & 1929 Macdonalds Brier Hearts
