= Sam Penwarden =

Canadian curler

- Curler
- Born: July 19, 1885; Winnipeg, Manitoba
- Died: May 23, 1930 (aged 44); Winnipeg, Manitoba
Medal record
Representing Manitoba
Macdonald Brier
| Gold medal – first place | 1928 Toronto |

Samuel Isaac Penwarden (July 19, 1885 – May 23, 1930) was a Canadian curler. He was the third of the 1928 Brier Champion team (skipped by Gordon Hudson), representing Manitoba. He died in 1930 of pneumonia.
