= MCA Bonspiel =

Annual Manitoba Curling Association bonspiel

The Manitoba Curling Association Bonspiel is the annual Manitoba Curling Association bonspiel held at the end of every January in Winnipeg, Manitoba in Canada. It is the largest curling bonspiel in the world with the tournament setting a record in 1988 with 1280 curling teams, as well as the oldest, with the first edition taking place in 1888. The tournament is unseeded and can have the top teams in the world facing first time curlers or otherwise. The current editions of the MCA Bonspiel qualifies 3 Manitoban teams into the men's provincial championship which is currently named the Bunge Championship.

The Bonspiel had a "Macdonald Brier Trophy" event that determined the Manitoba Championship from 1925 to 1936. On some occasions the overall grand aggregate champion would be declared the provincial champion, qualifying for the Macdonald Brier.
