= Dan Carey (curler) =

Canadian curler (born 1954)

Daniel J. Carey (born March 19, 1954, in Winnipeg) is a Canadian curler. He is a Canadian former Curling Champion and 4-time Manitoba Provincial Curling Champion. He played third for Vic Peters in 1992, defeating Jim Ursel in the Manitoba Provincial Championship final. The foursome went on to defeat Russ Howard in the 1992 Brier final, becoming the last rookie team to win the Brier until Kevin Koe did it 18 years later (2010). Carey (along with Peters, Chris Neufeld, and Don Rudd) returned to the Brier in 1993, but were eliminated in tiebreakers after a much-contested CCA rule change that cost them their first-place finish after the Round Robin. The 1992 & 1993 Vic Peters team, including Dan Carey, were inducted in the Manitoba Curling Hall of Fame in 2005 The Peters team (except with new lead Scott Grant) won the Safeway Select Manitoba Men's Provincial Championship again in 1997, defeating Kerry Burtnyk in the final. They would post an undefeated 11–0 record at the Brier, before falling to Kevin Martin in one of the highest-scoring, most exciting Brier finals in history (10-8 final score). Carey retired from curling following the 1999 season, and has since coached daughter Chelsea Carey, skip of the 2011 World Curling Tour Breakthrough Team of the Year.

== Personal life ==
Carey is married and has two children, including Chelsea Carey. He is a retired regional manager for GO Packaging.
