= Granite Club =

Private social and athletic club in Toronto, Canada

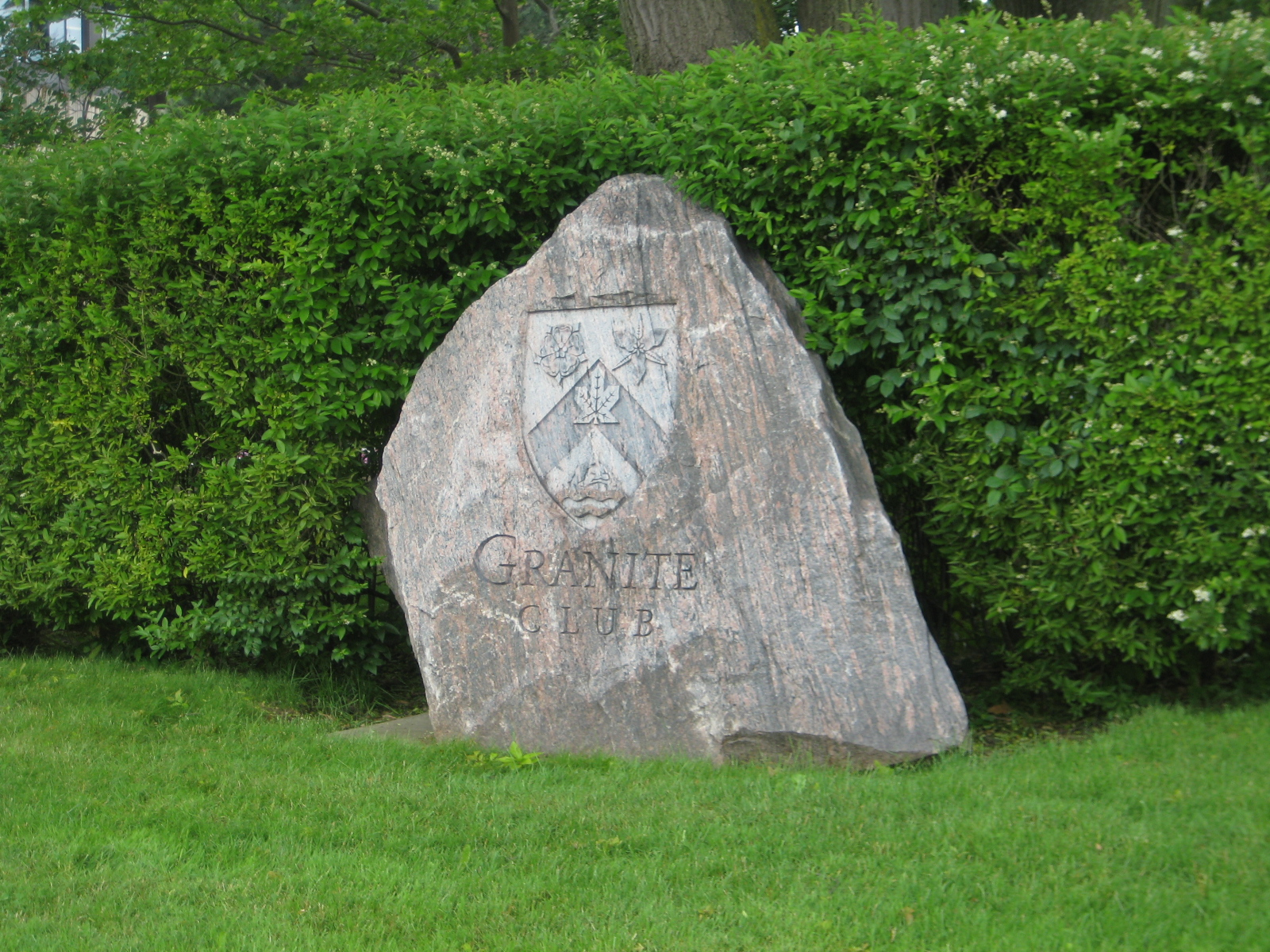
A sign outside the Granite Club, showing the club's coat of arms

The Granite Club (founded as the Toronto Granite Curling Club) is a private social and athletic club in Toronto, Ontario, Canada. Founded in 1875, it has a long history of sports competition. It is located at 2350 Bayview Avenue, north of midtown Toronto.

== History ==
The Granite Club was founded in 1875 on St. Mary's Street in downtown Toronto. It was initially a curling club. It provided a curling rink and a skating rink as facilities. After only five years on St. Mary's Street, expansion was needed in order to improve existing facilities and to accommodate the growing membership. In 1880, the club moved to 471 Church Street, where it added lawn bowling and tennis. By 1885, the membership had reached 447 members. Later in the 1880s, the club's members formed and sponsored an ice hockey team, considered the first or one of the first organized ice hockey teams in Toronto. The Toronto Granites ice hockey club would last into the 1900s and produce Canadian amateur champion and Olympic champion teams.

In the 1920s, the club organized competitive figure skating at the club. Over time, singles champions such as Kurt Browning, Patrick Chan and Barbara Ann Scott, have trained at the club. The pairs champions of Barbara Underhill and Paul Martini also trained at the club.

In 1925, a piece of land on St. Clair Avenue West, near Yonge Street, was purchased to accommodate a growing membership, the changing face of recreational activities and conversion from a gentlemen's to a family club. The St. Clair location housed seven badminton courts, several five-pin bowling lanes, a swimming pool and two squash courts in addition to curling, skating, lawn bowling and tennis.

The fourth club home was opened in 1972 on a 22-acre site on Bayview Avenue north of Lawrence Avenue in the Lawrence Park district, bordering on the Don Valley. Alterations and additions to the new building have continued and the acquisition of adjacent properties to the north have both expanded the club's developable land and established the ability to add floor space to the clubhouse. In 1994, five new tennis courts were added to the property to the north. In 2006, the club added one tennis court and introduced a state-of-the-art aquatics complex with a retractable roof. In 2012, the club broke ground on its most significant capital project since moving to Bayview. The "Shiftingravity" expansion has expanded fitness offerings, a new children's area and activity centre, a consolidated pro shop and 200 additional parking spaces.

The location on Church Street is now the site of Barbara Hall Park, and the 1906 clubhouse is now a community centre, "The 519". The north wall of the curling rink building on the south side of Monteith Street was partially retained, in use as a park fence. When the club moved in 1972, the St. Clair club was demolished, its front entrance becoming part of the Guild Park and Gardens collection.

== Facilities ==
The Granite Club has facilities for:

- aquatics
- badminton
- curling
- fitness
- golf (indoor range)
- ice skating
- pickleball
- squash
- restaurant dining and meetings
- salon, barbershop and spa services
- sports equipment and clothing
- table tennis
- tennis
- weddings and special events, as well as an art collection.
