= 1975 Macdonald Brier =

- Host city: Fredericton, New Brunswick
- Arena: Lady Beaverbrook Rink
- Dates: March 2–8
- Attendance: 20,672
- Winner: Northern Ontario
- Curling club: Fort William CC, Thunder Bay
- Skip: Bill Tetley
- Third: Rick Lang
- Second: Bill Hodgson, Jr.
- Lead: Peter Hnatiw

The 1975 Macdonald Brier, the Canadian men's national curling championship was held from March 2 to 8, 1975 at the Lady Beaverbrook Rink in Fredericton, New Brunswick. The total attendance for the week was 20,672. This was the first Brier in which a combined Territories (Northwest Territories and Yukon) team would participate, increasing the field from 11 to 12 teams. This arrangement would last until 2015 when each territory (Northwest Territories, Nunavut, and Yukon) was granted a separate entry along with a Team Canada entry for the defending Brier champions.

Team Northern Ontario, who was skipped by Bill Tetley captured the Brier tankard as they finished round robin play with a 9–2 record. This was Northern Ontario's first Brier championship since 1950 and their second overall as well as Tetley's only Brier championship. The Tetley rink would go onto represent Canada in the 1975 Air Canada Silver Broom, the men's world curling championship in Perth, Scotland where they would lose in the semifinal to eventual champion Switzerland.

Despite being a longshot to win the Brier (or even compete in general) as a first year entry, the Territories entry from Yukon, who was skipped by Don Twa remained in contention until the final draw of the tournament and eventually finished tied for second overall with an 8–3 record. To date, this is the best Brier finish by any team from the territories.

== Teams ==
The teams were listed as follows:

| Alberta | British Columbia | Manitoba |
|---|---|---|
| St. Albert CC, St. Albert Skip: Tom Reed; Third: Kevin Byrne; Second: Tony Rankel; Lead: Lorne Reed | Granite CC, Penticton Skip: Frank Beutle; Third: Donald Wood; Second: Robert Partridge; Lead: Raymond Jones | Granite CC, Winnipeg Skip: Rod Hunter; Third: Mike Riley; Second: Douglas Holmes; Lead: Bryan Wood |
| New Brunswick | Newfoundland | Northern Ontario |
| Capital WC, Fredericton Skip: John Clark; Third: David Silliphant; Second:Shelly Palk; Lead: John Cormier | St. John's CC, St. John's Skip: Bob Cole; Third: Joseph Power Jr. Second: Lew Andrews; Lead: Andrew Baird | Fort William CC, Thunder Bay Skip: Bill Tetley; Third: Rick Lang; Second: Bill Hodgson; Lead: Peter Hnatiw |
| Nova Scotia | Ontario | Prince Edward Island |
| Dartmouth CC, Dartmouth Skip: Dick Boyce; Third: Robert Margeson; Second: Michael Currie; Lead: Peter Comstock | Cataraqui G&CC, Kingston Skip: Alex Scott; Third: Edward Brown; Second: Mike Boyd; Lead: Thomas Miller | Charlottetown CC, Charlottetown Skip: John Fortier; Third: Donald MacRae; Second: David Kassner; Lead: Donald Callbeck |
| Quebec | Saskatchewan | Yukon/Northwest Territories |
| St. Laurent CC, Mount Royal Skip: Jim Ursel; Third: Art Lobel; Second: Don Aitken; Lead: Howard Atkinson | Regina CC, Regina Skip: Harvey Mazinke; Third: Bill Martin; Second: George Achtymichuk; Lead: Dan Klippenstein | Whitehorse CC, Whitehorse Skip: Don Twa; Third: Chuck Haines; Second: Kilburn Boyd; Lead: Lionel Stokes |

== Map of teams ==
Provincial Winners

== Round Robin standings ==
Final Round Robin standings

Key
| Brier champion |

| Province | Skip | W | L | PF | PA |
|---|---|---|---|---|---|
| Northern Ontario | Bill Tetley | 9 | 2 | 94 | 75 |
| Yukon/Northwest Territories | Don Twa | 8 | 3 | 93 | 67 |
| Alberta | Tom Reed | 8 | 3 | 102 | 83 |
| Saskatchewan | Harvey Mazinke | 7 | 4 | 85 | 73 |
| Manitoba | Rod Hunter | 6 | 5 | 73 | 67 |
| Quebec | Jim Ursel | 6 | 5 | 84 | 74 |
| Ontario | Alex Scott | 6 | 5 | 77 | 76 |
| New Brunswick | John Clark | 6 | 5 | 85 | 83 |
| Nova Scotia | Dick Boyce | 4 | 7 | 67 | 99 |
| Prince Edward Island | John Fortier | 4 | 7 | 74 | 86 |
| Newfoundland | Bob Cole | 1 | 10 | 64 | 96 |
| British Columbia | Frank Beutle | 1 | 10 | 72 | 91 |

== Round Robin results ==
All draw times are listed in Atlantic Standard Time (UTC-04:00).

=== Draw 1 ===
Sunday, March 2, 3:00 pm

| Team | 1 | 2 | 3 | 4 | 5 | 6 | 7 | 8 | 9 | 10 | 11 | 12 | Final |
| Yukon/Northwest Territories (Twa) | 1 | 0 | 0 | 0 | 1 | 0 | 0 | 3 | 0 | 0 | 0 | 2 | 7 |
| Prince Edward Island (Fortier) | 0 | 0 | 2 | 1 | 0 | 2 | 0 | 0 | 0 | 1 | 0 | 0 | 6 |

| Team | 1 | 2 | 3 | 4 | 5 | 6 | 7 | 8 | 9 | 10 | 11 | 12 | Final |
| Quebec (Ursel) | 0 | 1 | 0 | 2 | 0 | 0 | 0 | 0 | 1 | 1 | 0 | 0 | 5 |
| Manitoba (Hunter) | 0 | 0 | 2 | 0 | 0 | 3 | 0 | 0 | 0 | 0 | 1 | 1 | 7 |

| Team | 1 | 2 | 3 | 4 | 5 | 6 | 7 | 8 | 9 | 10 | 11 | 12 | Final |
| Alberta (Reed) | 1 | 0 | 0 | 2 | 0 | 1 | 0 | 2 | 0 | 2 | 1 | 0 | 9 |
| Nova Scotia (Boyce) | 0 | 2 | 1 | 0 | 2 | 0 | 3 | 0 | 1 | 0 | 0 | 1 | 10 |

| Team | 1 | 2 | 3 | 4 | 5 | 6 | 7 | 8 | 9 | 10 | 11 | 12 | Final |
| British Columbia (Beutle) | 0 | 1 | 1 | 0 | 3 | 0 | 0 | 0 | 0 | 0 | 0 | 0 | 5 |
| Ontario (Scott) | 2 | 0 | 0 | 1 | 0 | 1 | 1 | 0 | 0 | 1 | 0 | 1 | 7 |

| Team | 1 | 2 | 3 | 4 | 5 | 6 | 7 | 8 | 9 | 10 | 11 | 12 | 13 | Final |
| Saskatchewan (Mazinke) | 0 | 0 | 1 | 0 | 1 | 2 | 0 | 2 | 0 | 1 | 1 | 0 | 2 | 10 |
| New Brunswick (Clark) | 1 | 2 | 0 | 1 | 0 | 0 | 2 | 0 | 1 | 0 | 0 | 1 | 0 | 8 |

=== Draw 2 ===
Monday, March 3, 9:00 am

| Team | 1 | 2 | 3 | 4 | 5 | 6 | 7 | 8 | 9 | 10 | 11 | 12 | Final |
| Alberta (Reed) | 1 | 1 | 0 | 1 | 0 | 2 | 0 | 3 | 2 | 2 | X | X | 12 |
| Ontario (Scott) | 0 | 0 | 1 | 0 | 1 | 0 | 2 | 0 | 0 | 0 | X | X | 4 |

| Team | 1 | 2 | 3 | 4 | 5 | 6 | 7 | 8 | 9 | 10 | 11 | 12 | Final |
| Yukon/Northwest Territories (Twa) | 0 | 0 | 2 | 1 | 0 | 0 | 2 | 0 | 1 | 0 | 0 | X | 6 |
| New Brunswick (Clark) | 2 | 1 | 0 | 0 | 0 | 2 | 0 | 2 | 0 | 0 | 1 | X | 8 |

| Team | 1 | 2 | 3 | 4 | 5 | 6 | 7 | 8 | 9 | 10 | 11 | 12 | Final |
| Nova Scotia (Boyce) | 0 | 2 | 0 | 0 | 0 | 2 | 1 | 0 | 1 | 1 | 0 | 0 | 7 |
| Newfoundland (Cole) | 1 | 0 | 0 | 1 | 1 | 0 | 0 | 2 | 0 | 0 | 0 | 1 | 6 |

=== Draw 3 ===
Monday, March 3, 2:00 pm

| Team | 1 | 2 | 3 | 4 | 5 | 6 | 7 | 8 | 9 | 10 | 11 | 12 | Final |
| Saskatchewan (Mazinke) | 1 | 0 | 1 | 0 | 0 | 0 | 0 | 1 | 1 | 0 | 0 | 0 | 4 |
| Quebec (Ursel) | 0 | 1 | 0 | 0 | 0 | 0 | 0 | 0 | 0 | 1 | 0 | 1 | 3 |

| Team | 1 | 2 | 3 | 4 | 5 | 6 | 7 | 8 | 9 | 10 | 11 | 12 | Final |
| Manitoba (Hunter) | 2 | 0 | 0 | 2 | 0 | 0 | 2 | 0 | 0 | 0 | 1 | 1 | 8 |
| Northern Ontario (Tetley) | 0 | 2 | 0 | 0 | 2 | 3 | 0 | 0 | 2 | 0 | 0 | 0 | 9 |

| Team | 1 | 2 | 3 | 4 | 5 | 6 | 7 | 8 | 9 | 10 | 11 | 12 | 13 | Final |
| Prince Edward Island (Fortier) | 1 | 2 | 0 | 1 | 0 | 2 | 1 | 0 | 2 | 0 | 0 | 1 | 1 | 11 |
| British Columbia (Beutle) | 0 | 0 | 1 | 0 | 3 | 0 | 0 | 5 | 0 | 1 | 0 | 0 | 0 | 10 |

=== Draw 4 ===
Monday, March 3, 7:30 pm

| Team | 1 | 2 | 3 | 4 | 5 | 6 | 7 | 8 | 9 | 10 | 11 | 12 | Final |
| Nova Scotia (Boyce) | 1 | 0 | 0 | 0 | 0 | 0 | 2 | 0 | 1 | 1 | 0 | 0 | 5 |
| Manitoba (Hunter) | 0 | 3 | 0 | 1 | 0 | 2 | 0 | 0 | 0 | 0 | 0 | 1 | 7 |

| Team | 1 | 2 | 3 | 4 | 5 | 6 | 7 | 8 | 9 | 10 | 11 | 12 | Final |
| Alberta (Reed) | 0 | 0 | 3 | 1 | 0 | 0 | 0 | 0 | 2 | 0 | 0 | 2 | 8 |
| Prince Edward Island (Fortier) | 0 | 1 | 0 | 0 | 1 | 0 | 0 | 0 | 0 | 1 | 1 | 0 | 4 |

| Team | 1 | 2 | 3 | 4 | 5 | 6 | 7 | 8 | 9 | 10 | 11 | 12 | Final |
| Quebec (Ursel) | 0 | 3 | 0 | 1 | 0 | 0 | 2 | 1 | 2 | 0 | 2 | X | 11 |
| Newfoundland (Cole) | 2 | 0 | 1 | 0 | 1 | 0 | 0 | 0 | 0 | 1 | 0 | X | 5 |

| Team | 1 | 2 | 3 | 4 | 5 | 6 | 7 | 8 | 9 | 10 | 11 | 12 | Final |
| Northern Ontario (Tetley) | 0 | 2 | 0 | 1 | 0 | 0 | 1 | 0 | 0 | 2 | 0 | X | 6 |
| Saskatchewan (Mazinke) | 1 | 0 | 2 | 0 | 0 | 0 | 0 | 3 | 3 | 0 | 1 | X | 10 |

| Team | 1 | 2 | 3 | 4 | 5 | 6 | 7 | 8 | 9 | 10 | 11 | 12 | Final |
| Yukon/Northwest Territories (Twa) | 1 | 0 | 0 | 2 | 2 | 2 | 0 | 0 | 1 | 0 | 3 | X | 11 |
| Ontario (Scott) | 0 | 0 | 1 | 0 | 0 | 0 | 1 | 1 | 0 | 1 | 0 | X | 4 |

=== Draw 5 ===
Tuesday, March 4, 9:00 am

| Team | 1 | 2 | 3 | 4 | 5 | 6 | 7 | 8 | 9 | 10 | 11 | 12 | Final |
| Newfoundland (Cole) | 2 | 0 | 0 | 0 | 0 | 2 | 0 | 1 | 0 | 1 | 0 | X | 6 |
| Ontario (Scott) | 0 | 1 | 2 | 2 | 1 | 0 | 1 | 0 | 1 | 0 | 3 | X | 11 |

| Team | 1 | 2 | 3 | 4 | 5 | 6 | 7 | 8 | 9 | 10 | 11 | 12 | Final |
| Nova Scotia (Boyce) | 0 | 0 | 1 | 1 | 0 | 2 | 1 | 0 | 0 | 2 | 1 | 1 | 9 |
| British Columbia (Beutle) | 1 | 2 | 0 | 0 | 3 | 0 | 0 | 0 | 1 | 0 | 0 | 0 | 7 |

| Team | 1 | 2 | 3 | 4 | 5 | 6 | 7 | 8 | 9 | 10 | 11 | 12 | 13 | Final |
| Prince Edward Island (Fortier) | 0 | 1 | 1 | 0 | 0 | 0 | 2 | 0 | 0 | 1 | 0 | 1 | 0 | 6 |
| Saskatchewan (Mazinke) | 1 | 0 | 0 | 3 | 0 | 0 | 0 | 1 | 0 | 0 | 1 | 0 | 1 | 7 |

| Team | 1 | 2 | 3 | 4 | 5 | 6 | 7 | 8 | 9 | 10 | 11 | 12 | Final |
| Manitoba (Hunter) | 0 | 0 | 1 | 0 | 0 | 0 | 0 | 1 | 0 | 0 | 0 | X | 2 |
| New Brunswick (Clark) | 0 | 0 | 0 | 2 | 0 | 1 | 0 | 0 | 2 | 0 | 0 | X | 5 |

| Team | 1 | 2 | 3 | 4 | 5 | 6 | 7 | 8 | 9 | 10 | 11 | 12 | Final |
| Alberta (Reed) | 0 | 0 | 0 | 1 | 1 | 0 | 1 | 0 | 0 | 3 | 0 | X | 6 |
| Northern Ontario (Tetley) | 1 | 1 | 1 | 0 | 0 | 2 | 0 | 1 | 3 | 0 | 2 | X | 11 |

=== Draw 6 ===
Tuesday, March 4, 2:00 pm

| Team | 1 | 2 | 3 | 4 | 5 | 6 | 7 | 8 | 9 | 10 | 11 | 12 | Final |
| British Columbia (Beutle) | 1 | 1 | 1 | 0 | 1 | 0 | 0 | 0 | 0 | 2 | 0 | 0 | 6 |
| Northern Ontario (Tetley) | 0 | 0 | 0 | 1 | 0 | 1 | 0 | 1 | 0 | 0 | 2 | 3 | 8 |

| Team | 1 | 2 | 3 | 4 | 5 | 6 | 7 | 8 | 9 | 10 | 11 | 12 | Final |
| Saskatchewan (Mazinke) | 1 | 1 | 0 | 0 | 0 | 1 | 0 | 1 | 0 | 2 | 0 | 0 | 6 |
| Ontario (Scott) | 0 | 0 | 0 | 2 | 1 | 0 | 2 | 0 | 1 | 0 | 0 | 1 | 7 |

| Team | 1 | 2 | 3 | 4 | 5 | 6 | 7 | 8 | 9 | 10 | 11 | 12 | Final |
| Nova Scotia (Boyce) | 0 | 0 | 1 | 0 | 1 | 0 | 1 | 0 | 2 | 0 | 0 | X | 5 |
| Yukon/Northwest Territories (Twa) | 1 | 0 | 0 | 2 | 0 | 1 | 0 | 2 | 0 | 3 | 2 | X | 11 |

| Team | 1 | 2 | 3 | 4 | 5 | 6 | 7 | 8 | 9 | 10 | 11 | 12 | Final |
| Alberta (Reed) | 0 | 0 | 2 | 0 | 3 | 0 | 0 | 2 | 0 | 1 | 1 | 2 | 11 |
| Quebec (Ursel) | 1 | 1 | 0 | 1 | 0 | 2 | 1 | 0 | 2 | 0 | 0 | 0 | 8 |

| Team | 1 | 2 | 3 | 4 | 5 | 6 | 7 | 8 | 9 | 10 | 11 | 12 | Final |
| New Brunswick (Clark) | 3 | 0 | 0 | 4 | 0 | 0 | 1 | 1 | 0 | 1 | 0 | X | 10 |
| Newfoundland (Cole) | 0 | 3 | 1 | 0 | 0 | 1 | 0 | 0 | 1 | 0 | 2 | X | 8 |

=== Draw 7 ===
Wednesday, March 5, 2:00 pm

| Team | 1 | 2 | 3 | 4 | 5 | 6 | 7 | 8 | 9 | 10 | 11 | 12 | 13 | Final |
| New Brunswick (Clark) | 0 | 2 | 1 | 0 | 0 | 0 | 2 | 0 | 3 | 0 | 0 | 2 | 0 | 10 |
| Alberta (Reed) | 0 | 0 | 0 | 2 | 1 | 2 | 0 | 1 | 0 | 3 | 1 | 0 | 1 | 11 |

| Team | 1 | 2 | 3 | 4 | 5 | 6 | 7 | 8 | 9 | 10 | 11 | 12 | 13 | Final |
| Northern Ontario (Tetley) | 0 | 2 | 0 | 0 | 1 | 0 | 0 | 3 | 0 | 1 | 0 | 2 | 1 | 10 |
| Yukon/Northwest Territories (Twa) | 2 | 0 | 1 | 1 | 0 | 2 | 1 | 0 | 1 | 0 | 1 | 0 | 0 | 9 |

| Team | 1 | 2 | 3 | 4 | 5 | 6 | 7 | 8 | 9 | 10 | 11 | 12 | Final |
| British Columbia (Beutle) | 0 | 2 | 0 | 0 | 1 | 0 | 1 | 0 | 2 | 0 | 0 | X | 6 |
| Quebec (Ursel) | 1 | 0 | 2 | 1 | 0 | 2 | 0 | 1 | 0 | 0 | 2 | X | 9 |

| Team | 1 | 2 | 3 | 4 | 5 | 6 | 7 | 8 | 9 | 10 | 11 | 12 | Final |
| Newfoundland (Cole) | 0 | 2 | 1 | 2 | 0 | 2 | 1 | 0 | 0 | 0 | 0 | 0 | 8 |
| Prince Edward Island (Fortier) | 2 | 0 | 0 | 0 | 1 | 0 | 0 | 2 | 2 | 2 | 0 | 2 | 11 |

| Team | 1 | 2 | 3 | 4 | 5 | 6 | 7 | 8 | 9 | 10 | 11 | 12 | 13 | Final |
| Ontario (Scott) | 1 | 0 | 2 | 0 | 0 | 0 | 0 | 2 | 0 | 0 | 0 | 2 | 0 | 7 |
| Manitoba (Hunter) | 0 | 4 | 0 | 0 | 0 | 1 | 0 | 0 | 0 | 0 | 2 | 0 | 1 | 8 |

=== Draw 8 ===
Wednesday, March 5, 7:30 pm

| Team | 1 | 2 | 3 | 4 | 5 | 6 | 7 | 8 | 9 | 10 | 11 | 12 | Final |
| Ontario (Scott) | 0 | 2 | 0 | 0 | 3 | 0 | 1 | 0 | 2 | 0 | 1 | X | 9 |
| Nova Scotia (Boyce) | 1 | 0 | 1 | 0 | 0 | 1 | 0 | 1 | 0 | 0 | 0 | X | 4 |

| Team | 1 | 2 | 3 | 4 | 5 | 6 | 7 | 8 | 9 | 10 | 11 | 12 | Final |
| Manitoba (Hunter) | 0 | 1 | 0 | 1 | 0 | 0 | 0 | 0 | 1 | 0 | 0 | 1 | 4 |
| Newfoundland (Cole) | 0 | 0 | 1 | 0 | 1 | 0 | 0 | 0 | 0 | 1 | 0 | 0 | 3 |

| Team | 1 | 2 | 3 | 4 | 5 | 6 | 7 | 8 | 9 | 10 | 11 | 12 | Final |
| New Brunswick (Clark) | 1 | 2 | 0 | 1 | 0 | 1 | 0 | 0 | 0 | 2 | 1 | X | 8 |
| Prince Edward Island (Fortier) | 0 | 0 | 4 | 0 | 1 | 0 | 0 | 4 | 1 | 0 | 0 | X | 10 |

| Team | 1 | 2 | 3 | 4 | 5 | 6 | 7 | 8 | 9 | 10 | 11 | 12 | Final |
| Saskatchewan (Mazinke) | 0 | 0 | 1 | 0 | 2 | 0 | 0 | 1 | 0 | 0 | 3 | 0 | 7 |
| Yukon/Northwest Territories (Twa) | 0 | 1 | 0 | 0 | 0 | 0 | 1 | 0 | 2 | 2 | 0 | 2 | 8 |

| Team | 1 | 2 | 3 | 4 | 5 | 6 | 7 | 8 | 9 | 10 | 11 | 12 | Final |
| British Columbia (Beutle) | 0 | 0 | 0 | 2 | 0 | 2 | 1 | 0 | 2 | 0 | 1 | 0 | 8 |
| Alberta (Reed) | 2 | 0 | 0 | 0 | 1 | 0 | 0 | 2 | 0 | 3 | 0 | 1 | 9 |

=== Draw 9 ===
Thursday, March 6, 9:00 am

| Team | 1 | 2 | 3 | 4 | 5 | 6 | 7 | 8 | 9 | 10 | 11 | 12 | Final |
| Newfoundland (Cole) | 2 | 0 | 1 | 0 | 1 | 1 | 1 | 0 | 1 | 0 | 0 | X | 7 |
| Saskatchewan (Mazinke) | 0 | 4 | 0 | 0 | 0 | 0 | 0 | 2 | 0 | 3 | 0 | X | 9 |

| Team | 1 | 2 | 3 | 4 | 5 | 6 | 7 | 8 | 9 | 10 | 11 | 12 | Final |
| New Brunswick (Clark) | 3 | 0 | 0 | 2 | 0 | 0 | 2 | 0 | 3 | 0 | 0 | X | 10 |
| Nova Scotia (Boyce) | 0 | 0 | 1 | 0 | 0 | 2 | 0 | 1 | 0 | 0 | 3 | X | 7 |

| Team | 1 | 2 | 3 | 4 | 5 | 6 | 7 | 8 | 9 | 10 | 11 | 12 | Final |
| Northern Ontario (Tetley) | 0 | 0 | 2 | 0 | 2 | 0 | 0 | 2 | 1 | 0 | 1 | X | 8 |
| Ontario (Scott) | 1 | 0 | 0 | 2 | 0 | 0 | 3 | 0 | 0 | 0 | 0 | X | 6 |

| Team | 1 | 2 | 3 | 4 | 5 | 6 | 7 | 8 | 9 | 10 | 11 | 12 | Final |
| Manitoba (Hunter) | 2 | 1 | 0 | 2 | 0 | 0 | 2 | 0 | 1 | 0 | 1 | 0 | 9 |
| Alberta (Reed) | 0 | 0 | 1 | 0 | 1 | 1 | 0 | 2 | 0 | 2 | 0 | 3 | 10 |

| Team | 1 | 2 | 3 | 4 | 5 | 6 | 7 | 8 | 9 | 10 | 11 | 12 | Final |
| Quebec (Ursel) | 0 | 3 | 0 | 2 | 0 | 0 | 0 | 1 | 2 | 1 | 0 | X | 9 |
| Prince Edward Island (Fortier) | 1 | 0 | 1 | 0 | 1 | 0 | 0 | 0 | 0 | 0 | 1 | X | 4 |

=== Draw 10 ===
Thursday, March 6, 2:00 pm

| Team | 1 | 2 | 3 | 4 | 5 | 6 | 7 | 8 | 9 | 10 | 11 | 12 | Final |
| Alberta (Reed) | 0 | 2 | 0 | 0 | 0 | 0 | 2 | 0 | 1 | 0 | 1 | 0 | 6 |
| Yukon/Northwest Territories (Twa) | 2 | 0 | 2 | 1 | 0 | 1 | 0 | 1 | 0 | 0 | 0 | 1 | 8 |

| Team | 1 | 2 | 3 | 4 | 5 | 6 | 7 | 8 | 9 | 10 | 11 | 12 | Final |
| Prince Edward Island (Fortier) | 0 | 0 | 0 | 2 | 0 | 0 | 0 | 1 | 2 | 0 | 0 | 0 | 5 |
| Northern Ontario (Tetley) | 0 | 0 | 1 | 0 | 1 | 0 | 2 | 0 | 0 | 2 | 0 | 1 | 7 |

| Team | 1 | 2 | 3 | 4 | 5 | 6 | 7 | 8 | 9 | 10 | 11 | 12 | Final |
| Newfoundland (Cole) | 0 | 0 | 0 | 1 | 0 | 0 | 1 | 0 | 0 | 3 | 1 | 0 | 6 |
| British Columbia (Beutle) | 1 | 0 | 0 | 0 | 1 | 0 | 0 | 1 | 1 | 0 | 0 | 1 | 5 |

| Team | 1 | 2 | 3 | 4 | 5 | 6 | 7 | 8 | 9 | 10 | 11 | 12 | Final |
| Quebec (Ursel) | 0 | 0 | 0 | 0 | 2 | 0 | 3 | 0 | 3 | 0 | 0 | X | 8 |
| Nova Scotia (Boyce) | 0 | 1 | 0 | 0 | 0 | 2 | 0 | 1 | 0 | 1 | 0 | X | 5 |

| Team | 1 | 2 | 3 | 4 | 5 | 6 | 7 | 8 | 9 | 10 | 11 | 12 | Final |
| Manitoba (Hunter) | 1 | 2 | 0 | 1 | 0 | 0 | 3 | 1 | 0 | 1 | 1 | X | 10 |
| Saskatchewan (Mazinke) | 0 | 0 | 0 | 0 | 2 | 1 | 0 | 0 | 1 | 0 | 0 | X | 4 |

=== Draw 11 ===
Thursday, March 6, 7:30 pm

| Team | 1 | 2 | 3 | 4 | 5 | 6 | 7 | 8 | 9 | 10 | 11 | 12 | Final |
| Quebec (Ursel) | 1 | 1 | 1 | 0 | 3 | 1 | 0 | 0 | 3 | 0 | 2 | X | 12 |
| New Brunswick (Clark) | 0 | 0 | 0 | 1 | 0 | 0 | 2 | 1 | 0 | 2 | 0 | X | 6 |

| Team | 1 | 2 | 3 | 4 | 5 | 6 | 7 | 8 | 9 | 10 | 11 | 12 | 13 | Final |
| British Columbia (Beutle) | 0 | 1 | 1 | 0 | 0 | 1 | 0 | 1 | 0 | 2 | 0 | 1 | 0 | 7 |
| Saskatchewan (Mazinke) | 0 | 0 | 0 | 1 | 1 | 0 | 2 | 0 | 2 | 0 | 1 | 0 | 1 | 8 |

| Team | 1 | 2 | 3 | 4 | 5 | 6 | 7 | 8 | 9 | 10 | 11 | 12 | Final |
| Yukon/Northwest Territories (Twa) | 0 | 1 | 1 | 0 | 1 | 0 | 0 | 1 | 0 | 0 | 3 | 1 | 8 |
| Manitoba (Hunter) | 1 | 0 | 0 | 1 | 0 | 0 | 1 | 0 | 2 | 0 | 0 | 0 | 5 |

| Team | 1 | 2 | 3 | 4 | 5 | 6 | 7 | 8 | 9 | 10 | 11 | 12 | Final |
| Ontario (Scott) | 0 | 2 | 0 | 0 | 0 | 3 | 2 | 0 | 2 | 0 | 0 | X | 9 |
| Prince Edward Island (Fortier) | 1 | 0 | 0 | 1 | 0 | 0 | 0 | 1 | 0 | 1 | 1 | X | 5 |

| Team | 1 | 2 | 3 | 4 | 5 | 6 | 7 | 8 | 9 | 10 | 11 | 12 | Final |
| Northern Ontario (Tetley) | 0 | 1 | 0 | 0 | 0 | 1 | 2 | 4 | 0 | 2 | 1 | X | 11 |
| Nova Scotia (Boyce) | 1 | 0 | 1 | 0 | 1 | 0 | 0 | 0 | 1 | 0 | 0 | X | 4 |

=== Draw 12 ===
Friday, March 7, 2:00 pm

| Team | 1 | 2 | 3 | 4 | 5 | 6 | 7 | 8 | 9 | 10 | 11 | 12 | Final |
| Manitoba (Hunter) | 2 | 2 | 0 | 0 | 1 | 0 | 0 | 1 | 1 | 0 | 2 | X | 9 |
| British Columbia (Beutle) | 0 | 0 | 1 | 1 | 0 | 1 | 2 | 0 | 0 | 1 | 0 | X | 6 |

| Team | 1 | 2 | 3 | 4 | 5 | 6 | 7 | 8 | 9 | 10 | 11 | 12 | Final |
| Ontario (Scott) | 0 | 0 | 0 | 0 | 2 | 0 | 1 | 1 | 0 | 2 | 0 | 0 | 6 |
| Quebec (Ursel) | 1 | 0 | 1 | 1 | 0 | 1 | 0 | 0 | 1 | 0 | 1 | 1 | 7 |

| Team | 1 | 2 | 3 | 4 | 5 | 6 | 7 | 8 | 9 | 10 | 11 | 12 | Final |
| Saskatchewan (Mazinke) | 0 | 2 | 0 | 1 | 0 | 1 | 0 | 1 | 0 | 1 | 0 | X | 6 |
| Alberta (Reed) | 1 | 0 | 1 | 0 | 2 | 0 | 3 | 0 | 1 | 0 | 1 | X | 9 |

| Team | 1 | 2 | 3 | 4 | 5 | 6 | 7 | 8 | 9 | 10 | 11 | 12 | Final |
| New Brunswick (Clark) | 0 | 1 | 1 | 0 | 0 | 0 | 1 | 0 | 2 | 0 | 0 | 2 | 7 |
| Northern Ontario (Tetley) | 0 | 0 | 0 | 0 | 0 | 2 | 0 | 2 | 0 | 1 | 1 | 0 | 6 |

| Team | 1 | 2 | 3 | 4 | 5 | 6 | 7 | 8 | 9 | 10 | 11 | 12 | Final |
| Newfoundland (Cole) | 0 | 1 | 0 | 1 | 0 | 1 | 0 | 0 | 0 | 0 | 1 | X | 4 |
| Yukon/Northwest Territories (Twa) | 2 | 0 | 1 | 0 | 2 | 0 | 2 | 1 | 1 | 0 | 0 | X | 9 |

=== Draw 13 ===
Friday, March 7, 7:30 pm

| Team | 1 | 2 | 3 | 4 | 5 | 6 | 7 | 8 | 9 | 10 | 11 | 12 | Final |
| Prince Edward Island (Fortier) | 0 | 0 | 1 | 1 | 0 | 1 | 0 | 1 | 0 | 1 | 0 | 2 | 7 |
| Nova Scotia (Boyce) | 0 | 2 | 0 | 0 | 2 | 0 | 2 | 0 | 0 | 0 | 3 | 0 | 9 |

| Team | 1 | 2 | 3 | 4 | 5 | 6 | 7 | 8 | 9 | 10 | 11 | 12 | Final |
| Newfoundland (Cole) | 0 | 0 | 2 | 0 | 0 | 2 | 0 | 1 | 0 | 0 | 0 | X | 5 |
| Alberta (Reed) | 1 | 1 | 0 | 2 | 0 | 0 | 2 | 0 | 1 | 1 | 3 | X | 11 |

| Team | 1 | 2 | 3 | 4 | 5 | 6 | 7 | 8 | 9 | 10 | 11 | 12 | Final |
| Ontario (Scott) | 0 | 0 | 0 | 0 | 1 | 0 | 0 | 2 | 1 | 3 | 0 | X | 7 |
| New Brunswick (Clark) | 0 | 0 | 2 | 0 | 0 | 0 | 1 | 0 | 0 | 0 | 1 | X | 4 |

| Team | 1 | 2 | 3 | 4 | 5 | 6 | 7 | 8 | 9 | 10 | 11 | 12 | 13 | Final |
| Yukon/Northwest Territories (Twa) | 0 | 0 | 0 | 0 | 0 | 1 | 0 | 0 | 4 | 0 | 0 | 1 | 0 | 6 |
| British Columbia (Beutle) | 1 | 1 | 0 | 0 | 1 | 0 | 1 | 1 | 0 | 1 | 0 | 0 | 2 | 8 |

| Team | 1 | 2 | 3 | 4 | 5 | 6 | 7 | 8 | 9 | 10 | 11 | 12 | 13 | Final |
| Northern Ontario (Tetley) | 0 | 0 | 2 | 0 | 0 | 1 | 0 | 3 | 0 | 0 | 0 | 2 | 2 | 10 |
| Quebec (Ursel) | 0 | 0 | 0 | 2 | 0 | 0 | 2 | 0 | 0 | 3 | 1 | 0 | 0 | 8 |

=== Draw 14 ===
Saturday, March 8, 2:00 pm

| Team | 1 | 2 | 3 | 4 | 5 | 6 | 7 | 8 | 9 | 10 | 11 | 12 | Final |
| Northern Ontario (Tetley) | 0 | 0 | 0 | 2 | 3 | 0 | 1 | 0 | 0 | 1 | 0 | 1 | 8 |
| Newfoundland (Cole) | 1 | 2 | 1 | 0 | 0 | 0 | 0 | 1 | 0 | 0 | 1 | 0 | 6 |

| Team | 1 | 2 | 3 | 4 | 5 | 6 | 7 | 8 | 9 | 10 | 11 | 12 | Final |
| New Brunswick (Clark) | 1 | 3 | 0 | 0 | 1 | 0 | 0 | 0 | 1 | 2 | 1 | X | 9 |
| British Columbia (Beutle) | 0 | 0 | 2 | 0 | 0 | 2 | 0 | 0 | 0 | 0 | 0 | X | 4 |

| Team | 1 | 2 | 3 | 4 | 5 | 6 | 7 | 8 | 9 | 10 | 11 | 12 | Final |
| Quebec (Ursel) | 2 | 0 | 0 | 0 | 0 | 0 | 1 | 0 | 0 | 1 | X | X | 4 |
| Yukon/Northwest Territories (Twa) | 0 | 1 | 4 | 1 | 2 | 0 | 0 | 1 | 1 | 0 | X | X | 10 |

| Team | 1 | 2 | 3 | 4 | 5 | 6 | 7 | 8 | 9 | 10 | 11 | 12 | Final |
| Prince Edward Island (Fortier) | 0 | 0 | 1 | 0 | 1 | 0 | 1 | 0 | 1 | 0 | 0 | 1 | 5 |
| Manitoba (Hunter) | 1 | 0 | 0 | 0 | 0 | 0 | 0 | 1 | 0 | 2 | 0 | 0 | 4 |

| Team | 1 | 2 | 3 | 4 | 5 | 6 | 7 | 8 | 9 | 10 | 11 | 12 | Final |
| Nova Scotia (Boyce) | 0 | 0 | 1 | 0 | 0 | 0 | 0 | 0 | 0 | 1 | X | X | 2 |
| Saskatchewan (Mazinke) | 0 | 1 | 0 | 3 | 4 | 2 | 0 | 1 | 3 | 0 | X | X | 14 |

== Awards ==
=== All-Star Team ===
The media selected the following curlers as All-Stars.

| Position | Name | Team |
|---|---|---|
| Skip | Don Twa | Yukon/Northwest Territories |
| Third | Bill Martin (2) | Saskatchewan |
| Second | Mike Boyd | Ontario |
| Lead | Howard Atkinson | Quebec |

=== Ross G.L. Harstone Award ===
The Ross Harstone Award was presented to the player chosen by their fellow peers as the curler who best represented Harstone's high ideals of good sportsmanship, observance of the rules, exemplary conduct and curling ability.

| Name | Team | Position |
|---|---|---|
| Harvey Mazinke | Saskatchewan | Skip |
