= Peter Hnatiw =

Canadian curler

- Curler
- Born: c. 1932 (age 93–94)

Curling career
- Member Association: Northern Ontario
Medal record
Representing Canada
World Curling Championship
Bronze medal – third place	1975 Perth
Representing Northern Ontario
Macdonald Brier
Gold medal – first place	1975 Fredericton

Peter L. Hnatiw (born c. 1932) was a Canadian curler. He was the lead of the 1975 Brier Champion team (skipped by Bill Tetley), representing Northern Ontario. The team later went on to finish third at the World Championships of that year. He was a city employee for Thunder Bay, Ontario.
