= Bill Carey (curler) =

Canadian male curler

- Curler ♂

Team
- Curling club: Deer Lodge CC, Winnipeg, MB

Curling career
- Member Association: Manitoba
- Brier: 1: (1979)
- World Championship: 1 (1979)
Medal record
Curling
Representing Canada
World Championships
Bronze medal – third place	1979 Bern
Macdonald Brier
Representing Manitoba
Gold medal – first place	1979 Ottawa

William R. Carey is a Canadian curler and curling coach. He is a 1979 World Men's bronze medallist and a 1979 Brier champion.

== Awards ==
- Manitoba Curling Hall of Fame: 2014 (with all 1979 Canadian Men's Championship Team skipped by Barry Fry)

== Teams ==
=== Men's ===
Season	Skip	Third	Second	Lead	Events
1978–79	Barry Fry	Bill Carey	Gordon Sparkes	Bryan Wood	Brier 1979 (gold); WCC 1979 (bronze)

=== Mixed ===
Season	Skip	Third	Second	Lead
1983	Bill Carey	Chris More	Dan Carey	Marlene Cleutinx

== Personal life ==
Bill Carey is from a known Canadian family of curlers: his brother Dan is curler and coach, and 1992 Canadian men's champion; Dan's daughter Chelsea is two-time Canadian women's champion.

== Record as a coach of national teams ==
Year	Tournament, event	National team	Place
1997	1997 European Curling Championships	Denmark (men)	2nd place, silver medalist(s)
1999	1999 World Men's Curling Championship	Denmark (men)	6
1999	1999 European Curling Championships	Denmark (men)	2nd place, silver medalist(s)
2000	2000 World Men's Curling Championship	Denmark (men)	5
2000	2000 European Curling Championships	Denmark (men)	2nd place, silver medalist(s)
2001	2001 European Curling Championships	Denmark (men)	6
2003	2003 World Men's Curling Championship	Denmark (men)	6
