= Bill Hodgson (curler) =

Canadian curler (1944–2022)

- Curler
- Born: June 21, 1944; Thunder Bay, Ontario
- Died: January 25, 2022 (aged 77); Winnipeg, Manitoba

Team
- Curling club: Fort William CC, Thunder Bay; Granite CC, Winnipeg

Curling career
- Member Association: Northern Ontario (1974-1979); Manitoba (1979-2006)
- Brier: 1 (1975)
- World Championship: 1 (1975)
Medal record
Representing Canada
World Curling Championship
Bronze medal – third place	1975 Perth
Representing Northern Ontario
Macdonald Brier
Gold medal – first place	1975 Fredericton

William Jeffrey Michael Hodgson Jr. (June 21, 1944 – January 25, 2022) was a Canadian curler. He was the second on the 1975 Brier Champion team (skipped by Bill Tetley), representing Northern Ontario. The team later went on to finish third at the World Championships of that year. Originally from Thunder Bay, he was transferred to Winnipeg in 1979. He would later play lead for Manitoba at the 2005 and 2006 Canadian Senior Curling Championships, finishing 6th and 5th, respectively.

== Personal life ==
Hodgson was the son of Bebe and Bill Sr. He graduated from Lakehead University in 1965 and was a member of the university hockey team. He was vice president, commercial services, Cambrian Credit Union. He also worked for TD Bank, retiring from the South Winnipeg Commercial Banking Centre in 2000. He was married to Judy Glover and had four children.
