= Gordon Sparkes =

Canadian male curler

- Curler ♂

Team
- Curling club: Deer Lodge CC, Winnipeg, MB

Curling career
- Member Association: Manitoba
- Brier: 1: (1979)
- World Championship: 1 (1979)
Medal record
Curling
Representing Canada
World Championships
Bronze medal – third place	1979 Bern
Macdonald Brier
Representing Manitoba
Gold medal – first place	1979 Ottawa

Gordon A. "Sparkie" Sparkes (born c. 1945) is a Canadian curler from Winnipeg, Manitoba. He is a 1979 World Men's bronze medallist and a 1979 Brier champion. He curled competitively from 1964 until 1979.

== Awards ==
- Manitoba Curling Hall of Fame: 2014 (with all 1979 Canadian Men's Championship Team skipped by Barry Fry)

== Teams ==
Season	Skip	Third	Second	Lead	Events
1978–79	Barry Fry	Bill Carey	Gordon Sparkes	Bryan Wood	Brier 1979 (gold); WCC 1979 (bronze)
