= Paul Devlin =

Paul Devlin may refer to:

- Paul Devlin (curler) (1946–2021), Canadian curler
- Paul Devlin (filmmaker), sports editor and documentary filmmaker
- Paul Devlin (footballer) (born 1972), Scottish footballer
- Paul Devlin (Gaelic footballer), Tyrone Gaelic footballer and All Star nominee
