= 1979 Macdonald Brier =

- Host city: Ottawa, Ontario
- Arena: Ottawa Civic Centre
- Dates: March 4–10
- Attendance: 89,081
- Winner: Manitoba
- Curling club: Deer Lodge CC, Winnipeg
- Skip: Barry Fry
- Third: Bill Carey
- Second: Gordon Sparkes
- Lead: Bryan Wood

The 1979 Macdonald Brier, the Canadian men's curling championship was held from March 4 to 10, 1979 at the Ottawa Civic Centre in Ottawa, Ontario. For the second straight year, the total attendance for the week set a then-record where 89,081 attended the event. This was the last Brier where the round robin would determine the champion without a playoff.

Team Manitoba, who was skipped by Barry Fry captured the Brier tankard as they finished round robin play with a 10–1 record as they clinched the title with after the Friday night draw. This was Manitoba's twentieth title and the only Brier won by Fry. The Fry rink would go onto represent Canada at the 1979 Air Canada Silver Broom, the men's world curling championship in Bern, Switzerland where they lost in the semifinal to eventual champion Norway.

It would be the last Brier under the sponsorship of Macdonald Tobacco. This marked an end of an era, as Macdonald Tobacco had sponsored the event since the first Brier in 1927. Following the final draw, the head of Macdonald Tobacco, David Macdonald Stewart declared "[f]or half a century, Macdonald Tobacco has followed an idea ... a dream to ... bring together Canadians, from all parts of the country and all walks of life, in a national sporting event. Curling was the ideal sport. It's been a wonderful experience. We've now seen the final chapter in 50 years of Canadian history". To commemorate the end of the Macdonald era, every living Brier champion skip at the time were invited to attend the Brier, and had their picture taken together. The lone surviving curler from the 1927 Brier, Emmet Smith (Northern Ontario) was also invited. The group of skips gathered before the final draw of the event for a special ceremony.

The event was marred with slow ice conditions and bad rocks, which were borrowed from a local curling club. The rocks were mismatched and pitted which "reduced shotmaking to a guessing game." Part way through the week, organizers asked for the teams to vote on changing the rocks. The teams that favoured hitting, including the leading Manitoba rink opposed changing the rocks, as the mismatched rocks made draw shots more difficult than hit shots.

== Teams ==
The teams were listed as follows:

Alberta	British Columbia	Manitoba
Crestwood CC, Edmonton Skip: Paul Devlin; Third: John Hunter; Second: Pat Ryan; Lead: Derek Devlin	Vancouver CC, Vancouver Skip: Glen Pierce; Third: Wayne Matthewson; Second: Bruce Davey; Lead: Fuji Miki	Deer Lodge CC, Winnipeg Skip: Barry Fry; Third: Bill Carey; Second: Gordon Sparkes; Lead: Bryan Wood
New Brunswick	Newfoundland	Northern Ontario
Thistle St. Andrews CC, Saint John Skip: Richard Belyea; Third: Charlie Sullivan; Second:Don Pennell; Lead: Brian McLeod	St. John's CC, St. John's Skip: Jeff Thomas; Third: Toby McDonald; Second: Peter Hollett; Lead: Ken Thomas	Thunder Bay WC, Thunder Bay Skip: Larry Pineau; Third: Scott Hamilton; Second: George Campbell; Lead: Cliff Campbell
Nova Scotia	Ontario	Prince Edward Island
Dartmouth CC, Dartmouth Skip: Alan Darragh; Third: Peter MacPhee; Second: Mike Currie; Lead: Dave Durrant	Annandale CC, Pickering Skip: Bob Fedosa; Third: Bob Turcotte; Second: Craig Garratt; Lead: Doug Morrison	Charlottetown CC, Charlottetown Skip: Wayne Matheson; Third: Ken MacDonald; Second: Al Legerwood; Lead: John Scales
Quebec	Saskatchewan	Northwest Territories/Yukon
St. Laurent CC, Mount Royal Skip: Jim Ursel; Third: Don Aitken; Second: Warren Wallace; Lead: Malcolm Turner	Nutana CC, Saskatoon Skip: Rick Folk; Third: Bob Thompson; Second: Tom Wilson; Lead: Jim Wilson	Yellowknife CC, Yellowknife Skip: Don Strang; Third: Klaus Schoenne; Second: Rick Borden; Lead: Clay Cedarholm

== Map of teams ==
Provincial Winners

== Round Robin standings ==
Final Round Robin standings

Key
Brier champion

Province	Skip	W	L	PF	PA
Manitoba	Barry Fry	10	1	67	40
Saskatchewan	Rick Folk	8	3	74	59
Northern Ontario	Larry Pineau	8	3	63	54
Ontario	Bob Fedosa	6	5	56	58
Prince Edward Island	Wayne Matheson	6	5	67	49
Alberta	Paul Devlin	6	5	62	62
Quebec	Jim Ursel	5	6	61	62
British Columbia	Glen Pierce	5	6	61	69
Nova Scotia	Alan Darragh	4	7	59	71
New Brunswick	Richard Belyea	3	8	44	69
Newfoundland	Jeff Thomas	3	8	63	71
Northwest Territories/Yukon	Don Strang	2	9	54	67

== Round Robin results ==
All draw times are listed in Eastern Standard Time (UTC−05:00)

=== Draw 1 ===
Sunday, March 4, 2:00 pm

Sheet A	1	2	3	4	5	6	7	8	9	10	Final
Prince Edward Island (Matheson)	1	0	1	0	0	1	0	1	1	0	5
Ontario (Fedosa)	0	0	0	0	2	0	2	0	0	2	6

Sheet B	1	2	3	4	5	6	7	8	9	10	Final
British Columbia (Pierce)	0	0	1	0	1	1	0	2	0	X	5
New Brunswick (Belyea)	0	0	0	1	0	0	1	0	1	X	3

Sheet C	1	2	3	4	5	6	7	8	9	10	Final
Alberta (Devlin)	0	2	1	0	2	1	0	2	0	X	8
Nova Scotia (Darragh)	2	0	0	1	0	0	2	0	1	X	6

Sheet D	1	2	3	4	5	6	7	8	9	10	Final
Northwest Territories/Yukon (Strang)	0	0	1	0	2	1	0	0	1	0	5
Manitoba (Fry)	1	1	0	1	0	0	0	2	0	1	6

Sheet E	1	2	3	4	5	6	7	8	9	10	Final
Quebec (Ursel)	1	0	3	0	1	0	1	1	1	X	8
Newfoundland (Thomas)	0	1	0	1	0	0	0	0	0	X	2

=== Draw 2 ===
Sunday, March 4, 7:30 pm

Sheet A	1	2	3	4	5	6	7	8	9	10	Final
British Columbia (Pierce)	0	2	0	0	0	2	1	0	1	X	6
Manitoba (Fry)	0	0	1	1	2	0	0	3	0	X	7

Sheet B	1	2	3	4	5	6	7	8	9	10	Final
Alberta (Devlin)	1	0	0	0	0	2	0	0	0	0	3
Prince Edward Island (Matheson)	0	0	1	0	0	0	0	2	2	1	6

Sheet C	1	2	3	4	5	6	7	8	9	10	Final
Saskatchewan (Folk)	2	0	1	0	0	2	1	1	X	X	7
Northern Ontario (Pineau)	0	0	0	0	1	0	0	0	X	X	1

Sheet D	1	2	3	4	5	6	7	8	9	10	Final
Ontario (Fedosa)	1	1	0	0	1	0	1	0	2	X	6
Nova Scotia (Darragh)	0	0	1	0	0	1	0	1	0	X	3

Sheet E	1	2	3	4	5	6	7	8	9	10	Final
New Brunswick (Belyea)	0	0	2	0	1	0	0	0	0	1	4
Northwest Territories/Yukon (Strang)	0	0	0	0	0	2	1	0	0	0	3

=== Draw 3 ===
Monday, March 5, 9:30 am

Sheet B	1	2	3	4	5	6	7	8	9	10	Final
Northern Ontario (Pineau)	0	0	0	2	0	0	0	0	1	X	3
Nova Scotia (Darragh)	2	0	0	0	0	2	0	1	0	X	5

Sheet C	1	2	3	4	5	6	7	8	9	10	Final
British Columbia (Pierce)	0	0	1	0	1	0	0	1	X	X	3
Quebec (Ursel)	2	2	0	3	0	2	1	0	X	X	10

Sheet D	1	2	3	4	5	6	7	8	9	10	Final
Manitoba (Fry)	2	0	0	0	0	0	4	0	0	X	6
Newfoundland (Thomas)	0	0	0	2	0	0	0	2	1	X	5

=== Draw 4 ===
Monday, March 5, 2:00 pm

Sheet B	1	2	3	4	5	6	7	8	9	10	Final
New Brunswick (Belyea)	0	0	0	0	0	0	2	0	1	X	3
Alberta (Devlin)	0	0	0	1	1	1	0	3	0	X	6

Sheet C	1	2	3	4	5	6	7	8	9	10	Final
Northwest Territories/Yukon (Strang)	2	0	1	1	0	2	2	0	2	X	10
Ontario (Fedosa)	0	1	0	0	1	0	0	1	0	X	3

Sheet D	1	2	3	4	5	6	7	8	9	10	Final
Prince Edward Island (Matheson)	2	1	1	1	0	4	0	0	X	X	9
Saskatchewan (Folk)	0	0	0	0	1	0	1	1	X	X	3

=== Draw 5 ===
Monday, March 5, 7:30 pm

Sheet A	1	2	3	4	5	6	7	8	9	10	Final
Quebec (Ursel)	0	1	0	0	0	1	3	2	0	X	7
Nova Scotia (Darragh)	0	0	0	1	1	0	0	0	1	X	3

Sheet B	1	2	3	4	5	6	7	8	9	10	Final
Saskatchewan (Folk)	0	0	0	0	0	2	0	2	0	1	5
Northwest Territories/Yukon (Strang)	0	0	0	0	2	0	1	0	0	0	3

Sheet C	1	2	3	4	5	6	7	8	9	10	Final
Newfoundland (Thomas)	2	0	0	2	0	0	1	0	4	X	9
Prince Edward Island (Matheson)	0	0	0	0	1	2	0	1	0	X	4

Sheet D	1	2	3	4	5	6	7	8	9	10	Final
Northern Ontario (Pineau)	2	0	1	1	0	0	2	0	1	X	7
New Brunswick (Belyea)	0	1	0	0	1	1	0	2	0	X	5

Sheet E	1	2	3	4	5	6	7	8	9	10	Final
Alberta (Devlin)	0	0	0	1	1	0	2	0	0	X	4
Ontario (Fedosa)	1	0	1	0	0	3	0	0	3	X	8

=== Draw 6 ===
Tuesday, March 6, 9:00 am

Sheet A	1	2	3	4	5	6	7	8	9	10	Final
Northwest Territories/Yukon (Strang)	0	1	0	0	2	0	0	0	0	0	3
Northern Ontario (Pineau)	0	0	1	0	0	0	0	2	1	1	5

Sheet B	1	2	3	4	5	6	7	8	9	10	Final
Nova Scotia (Darragh)	2	0	0	1	0	0	0	0	X	X	3
Newfoundland (Thomas)	0	0	2	0	3	3	1	2	X	X	11

Sheet C	1	2	3	4	5	6	7	8	9	10	11	Final
Ontario (Fedosa)	0	0	1	0	1	1	0	0	0	1	0	4
Quebec (Ursel)	0	0	0	1	0	0	0	2	1	0	1	5

Sheet D	1	2	3	4	5	6	7	8	9	10	Final
Saskatchewan (Folk)	1	0	0	1	0	2	0	1	1	1	7
British Columbia (Pierce)	0	0	3	0	1	0	2	0	0	0	6

Sheet E	1	2	3	4	5	6	7	8	9	10	Final
New Brunswick (Belyea)	0	0	1	0	0	0	0	0	X	X	1
Manitoba (Fry)	2	1	0	1	1	3	1	1	X	X	10

=== Draw 7 ===
Tuesday, March 6, 2:00 pm

Sheet A	1	2	3	4	5	6	7	8	9	10	Final
Alberta (Devlin)	3	0	0	0	1	1	0	1	0	1	7
Newfoundland (Thomas)	0	0	2	0	0	0	2	0	1	0	5

Sheet B	1	2	3	4	5	6	7	8	9	10	Final
Northern Ontario (Pineau)	0	1	0	0	0	1	1	0	0	X	3
Manitoba (Fry)	1	0	0	3	2	0	0	0	4	X	10

Sheet C	1	2	3	4	5	6	7	8	9	10	11	Final
New Brunswick (Belyea)	0	1	1	1	0	0	2	1	0	0	0	6
Saskatchewan (Folk)	1	0	0	0	1	3	0	0	0	1	2	8

Sheet D	1	2	3	4	5	6	7	8	9	10	Final
Quebec (Ursel)	0	0	1	0	0	1	0	1	X	X	3
Prince Edward Island (Matheson)	2	1	0	1	4	0	2	0	X	X	10

Sheet E	1	2	3	4	5	6	7	8	9	10	11	Final
Northwest Territories/Yukon (Strang)	0	2	1	0	0	0	2	0	0	1	0	6
British Columbia (Pierce)	0	0	0	4	0	0	0	2	0	0	1	7

=== Draw 8 ===
Wednesday, March 7, 2:00 pm

Sheet A	1	2	3	4	5	6	7	8	9	10	Final
Saskatchewan (Folk)	1	1	0	0	2	0	1	1	1	X	7
Manitoba (Fry)	0	0	0	2	0	1	0	0	0	X	3

Sheet B	1	2	3	4	5	6	7	8	9	10	Final
Quebec (Ursel)	0	0	1	0	1	0	1	0	0	X	3
Alberta (Devlin)	0	2	0	2	0	1	0	0	3	X	8

Sheet C	1	2	3	4	5	6	7	8	9	10	Final
Northern Ontario (Pineau)	0	2	0	1	0	1	0	0	0	1	5
British Columbia (Pierce)	0	0	1	0	1	0	1	0	0	0	3

Sheet D	1	2	3	4	5	6	7	8	9	10	Final
Newfoundland (Thomas)	0	1	0	0	0	0	0	1	2	0	4
Ontario (Fedosa)	1	0	1	0	0	0	1	0	0	2	5

Sheet E	1	2	3	4	5	6	7	8	9	10	Final
Nova Scotia (Darragh)	0	0	0	1	0	1	0	1	0	X	3
Prince Edward Island (Matheson)	1	0	1	0	2	0	3	0	1	X	8

=== Draw 9 ===
Wednesday, March 7, 7:30 pm

Sheet A	1	2	3	4	5	6	7	8	9	10	Final
Northern Ontario (Pineau)	0	1	0	0	2	0	1	3	0	X	7
Prince Edward Island (Matheson)	1	0	0	1	0	1	0	0	1	X	4

Sheet B	1	2	3	4	5	6	7	8	9	10	Final
New Brunswick (Belyea)	0	1	1	0	0	1	0	0	0	0	3
Ontario (Fedosa)	1	0	0	0	1	0	1	0	1	1	5

Sheet C	1	2	3	4	5	6	7	8	9	10	Final
Nova Scotia (Darragh)	0	0	0	1	0	0	3	0	0	X	4
Northwest Territories/Yukon (Strang)	1	0	2	0	1	1	0	1	1	X	7

Sheet D	1	2	3	4	5	6	7	8	9	10	Final
Alberta (Devlin)	1	0	0	2	0	0	0	1	0	0	4
British Columbia (Pierce)	0	1	1	0	0	0	2	0	0	1	5

Sheet E	1	2	3	4	5	6	7	8	9	10	Final
Saskatchewan (Folk)	2	0	0	1	0	1	0	2	1	1	8
Quebec (Ursel)	0	1	0	0	1	0	3	0	0	0	5

=== Draw 10 ===
Thursday, March 8, 2:00 pm

Sheet A	1	2	3	4	5	6	7	8	9	10	Final
Nova Scotia (Darragh)	0	5	1	0	3	0	1	2	X	X	12
New Brunswick (Belyea)	1	0	0	1	0	1	0	0	X	X	3

Sheet B	1	2	3	4	5	6	7	8	9	10	Final
Newfoundland (Thomas)	2	0	0	1	0	0	0	1	0	X	4
Saskatchewan (Folk)	0	0	2	0	1	2	1	2	2	X	8

Sheet C	1	2	3	4	5	6	7	8	9	10	Final
Manitoba (Fry)	0	0	1	0	0	1	1	1	0	X	4
Ontario (Fedosa)	0	0	0	0	1	0	0	0	1	X	2

Sheet D	1	2	3	4	5	6	7	8	9	10	Final
Prince Edward Island (Matheson)	0	1	0	2	0	0	1	0	2	X	6
Northwest Territories/Yukon (Strang)	0	0	1	0	0	1	0	1	0	X	3

Sheet E	1	2	3	4	5	6	7	8	9	10	Final
Northern Ontario (Pineau)	1	0	3	2	0	1	0	1	2	X	10
Alberta (Devlin)	0	0	0	0	1	0	2	0	0	X	3

=== Draw 11 ===
Thursday, March 8, 7:30 pm

Sheet A	1	2	3	4	5	6	7	8	9	10	Final
Alberta (Devlin)	3	0	1	3	1	0	2	0	X	X	10
Saskatchewan (Folk)	0	2	0	0	0	3	0	2	X	X	7

Sheet B	1	2	3	4	5	6	7	8	9	10	Final
Manitoba (Fry)	0	1	0	1	0	1	0	0	0	2	5
Nova Scotia (Darragh)	0	0	1	0	1	0	0	1	0	0	3

Sheet C	1	2	3	4	5	6	7	8	9	10	Final
British Columbia (Pierce)	2	0	0	2	0	1	1	0	2	X	8
Newfoundland (Thomas)	0	2	1	0	1	0	0	1	0	X	5

Sheet D	1	2	3	4	5	6	7	8	9	10	Final
Quebec (Ursel)	1	0	0	1	0	1	1	0	1	0	5
Northern Ontario (Pineau)	0	0	1	0	1	0	0	1	0	3	6

Sheet E	1	2	3	4	5	6	7	8	9	10	Final
Prince Edward Island (Matheson)	3	0	0	1	1	1	0	2	0	X	8
New Brunswick (Belyea)	0	0	1	0	0	0	1	0	1	X	3

=== Draw 12 ===
Friday, March 9, 2:00 pm

Sheet A	1	2	3	4	5	6	7	8	9	10	Final
Newfoundland (Thomas)	1	0	1	0	3	2	0	2	2	X	11
Northwest Territories/Yukon (Strang)	0	2	0	1	0	0	1	0	0	X	4

Sheet B	1	2	3	4	5	6	7	8	9	10	Final
Ontario (Fedosa)	0	1	0	1	0	1	0	1	0	0	4
Northern Ontario (Pineau)	1	0	0	0	2	0	1	0	1	1	6

Sheet C	1	2	3	4	5	6	7	8	9	10	Final
Quebec (Ursel)	0	0	0	2	0	0	1	0	0	0	3
New Brunswick (Belyea)	1	0	0	0	0	1	0	2	0	1	5

Sheet D	1	2	3	4	5	6	7	8	9	10	Final
Manitoba (Fry)	0	0	0	0	2	0	0	1	0	2	5
Alberta (Devlin)	0	0	0	1	0	0	1	0	1	0	3

Sheet E	1	2	3	4	5	6	7	8	9	10	Final
British Columbia (Pierce)	0	1	0	3	0	2	0	0	0	X	6
Nova Scotia (Darragh)	4	0	1	0	3	0	0	0	1	X	9

=== Draw 13 ===
Friday, March 9, 7:30 pm

Sheet A	1	2	3	4	5	6	7	8	9	10	Final
Ontario (Fedosa)	1	2	2	0	2	0	0	0	0	2	9
British Columbia (Pierce)	0	0	0	1	0	2	1	1	2	0	7

Sheet B	1	2	3	4	5	6	7	8	9	10	Final
Northwest Territories/Yukon (Strang)	1	0	0	2	0	1	0	2	0	X	6
Quebec (Ursel)	0	0	4	0	4	0	1	0	1	X	10

Sheet C	1	2	3	4	5	6	7	8	9	10	Final
Prince Edward Island (Matheson)	0	0	0	0	0	1	0	0	1	1	3
Manitoba (Fry)	0	1	0	0	0	0	2	1	0	0	4

Sheet D	1	2	3	4	5	6	7	8	9	10	Final
Nova Scotia (Darragh)	2	1	3	0	0	1	0	0	0	1	8
Saskatchewan (Folk)	0	0	0	0	2	0	2	2	1	0	7

Sheet E	1	2	3	4	5	6	7	8	9	10	Final
Newfoundland (Thomas)	0	0	1	0	1	0	2	1	0	X	5
Northern Ontario (Pineau)	3	1	0	3	0	2	0	0	1	X	10

=== Draw 14 ===
Saturday, March 10, 1:30 pm

Sheet A	1	2	3	4	5	6	7	8	9	10	Final
Manitoba (Fry)	0	2	0	0	1	1	0	1	2	X	7
Quebec (Ursel)	0	0	0	1	0	0	1	0	0	X	2

Sheet B	1	2	3	4	5	6	7	8	9	10	Final
Prince Edward Island (Matheson)	0	0	1	1	0	0	1	0	1	0	4
British Columbia (Pierce)	1	0	0	0	0	1	0	1	0	2	5

Sheet C	1	2	3	4	5	6	7	8	9	10	Final
Northwest Territories/Yukon (Strang)	0	2	0	1	1	0	0	0	0	X	4
Alberta (Devlin)	2	0	1	0	0	1	1	0	1	X	6

Sheet D	1	2	3	4	5	6	7	8	9	10	Final
New Brunswick (Belyea)	1	0	2	0	1	3	0	0	1	X	8
Newfoundland (Thomas)	0	0	0	1	0	0	0	1	0	X	2

Sheet E	1	2	3	4	5	6	7	8	9	10	Final
Ontario (Fedosa)	0	0	1	0	1	0	2	0	0	X	4
Saskatchewan (Folk)	1	1	0	1	0	1	0	1	2	X	7

== Awards ==
=== All-Star Team ===
The media selected the following curlers as All-Stars.

Position	Name	Team
Skip	Barry Fry	Manitoba
Third	Bill Carey	Manitoba
Second	George Campbell	Northern Ontario
Lead	Bryan Wood	Manitoba

=== Ross G.L. Harstone Award ===
The Ross Harstone Award was presented to the player chosen by their fellow peers as the curler who best represented Harstone's high ideals of good sportsmanship, observance of the rules, exemplary conduct and curling ability.

As of 2023, this is the only Brier in which two players won the Harstone Award.

Name	Team	Position
Wayne Matheson	Prince Edward Island	Skip
Dave Durrant	Nova Scotia	Lead
