= Peggy Casselman =

Medal record

Women's Curling

Representing Manitoba

Canadian Women's Curling Championship
| Gold medal – first place | 1965 Halifax | |

Margaret Rose Casselman (January 14, 1928–January 18, 2006) was a Canadian curler. During her career, she won the Canadian women's and mixed championships.

Casselman was born in Winnipeg, Manitoba, the daughter of Charles and Constance Douglas.

== Career ==
=== Women's ===
In 1963, Casselman took a look around Winnipeg's brand new Wildewood Curling Club, and assembled a team of three skips, Val Taylor, Pat McDonald and Pat Scott, with the mantra that "[i]f you're serious about competitive curling, you have to pack a rink." Two years later, with Casselman at skip, the team won the Manitoba women's championship, defeating Bertha Thompson of Minnedosa in the final. This win qualified the rink to represent Manitoba at the 1965 Diamond D Championship, Canada's national women's curling championship. At the event, both Manitoba and Alberta (skipped by Dorothy Thompson) headed into the final round with identical 7–1 records, tied for first place. The teams just so happened to be facing off against each other in the last draw, with the winner clinching the championship. In the game, Manitoba took an early 6–0 lead after four ends, and while Alberta battled back to trail 6–4 after six, the teams traded points in the eighth and ninth before Manitoba ran Alberta out of rocks in the tenth, winning the game 7–5. It was the first national women's curling championship for Manitoba.

In 1966, Casselman and her rink were eliminated in zone playdowns to Min McDonald of Pine Falls. A month later, her team won the Grand Aggregate and the Lady Eaton events at the Manitoba Ladies Curling Association bonspiel.

In 1967, the team made it to the final of Manitoba championship, but lost to Betty Duguid in an extra end.

In 1969, Casselman joined the 1968 Manitoba champion Pat Brunsdon rink as her third.

=== Mixed ===
In 1970, Casselman won the Manitoba Mixed Championship, throwing lead rocks for Barry Fry. The team represented Manitoba at the 1970 Canadian Mixed Curling Championship, where they finished third, with an 8–2 record. The Fry mixed rink won another provincial title in 1973, this time with Casselman throwing third. The team then went on to win the 1973 Canadian Mixed Championship, finishing the event with a 9–1 record.

=== Seniors ===
Casselman won the 1989 provincial seniors championship throwing lead rocks for Joan Ingram. At the 1989 Canadian Senior Curling Championships, the team finished with a 4–6 record.

== Honours ==
Her 1965 Canadian champion rink was inducted into the Manitoba Curling Hall of Fame in 1988. Her 1973 Canadian mixed championship rink was inducted into the Manitoba Curling Hall of Fame in 1973.

== Personal life ==
Outside of curling, she was the first female representative for Carling O'Keefe Brewery. In addition to curling, she played basketball, bowling, bridge and owned a thoroughbred horse. Later in life, she lived in Elie, Manitoba, and died at the Grace Hospice in Winnipeg in 2006. She had two children.
