= 1965 Diamond D Championship =

Canadian women's curling championship

1965 Diamond "D" Championship
- Host city: Halifax, Nova Scotia
- Arena: Mayflower Curling Club
- Dates: February 22–25
- Winner: Manitoba
- Curling club: Wildewood Ladies CC, Winnipeg
- Skip: Peggy Casselman
- Third: Val Taylor
- Second: Pat MacDonald
- Lead: Pat Scott

The 1965 Diamond "D" Championship the Canadian women's curling championship was held from February 22 to 25, 1965 at the Mayflower Curling Club in Halifax, Nova Scotia.

Team Manitoba, who was skipped by Peggy Casselman won the event by finishing the round robin with an 8–1 record. This was Manitoba's first championship.

This was the first championship that would come down to a "winner take all" final draw as both Alberta and Manitoba entered their matchup in the final draw with identical 7–1 records. Manitoba jumped out to a 6–0 lead after four ends and despite an Alberta comeback, Manitoba would hold off Alberta 7–5 to capture the championship. Alberta would finish runner-up as Prince Edward Island scored three in the last end against Nova Scotia to win 9–8 in their final game and thus avoided a tiebreaker playoff between Alberta and Nova Scotia for runner-up.

This championship would set a record for the fewest extra end games in one tournament as Ontario's 13–11 victory over Quebec in Draw 3 was the only game that went to an extra end in the tournament. This record was eventually matched in 1979.

== Teams ==
The teams are listed as follows:

Alberta	British Columbia	Manitoba	New Brunswick	Newfoundland
Edmonton CC, Edmonton Skip: Dorothy Thompson; Third: Vivian Kortgaard; Second: Ruth Hayes; Lead: Ila Watson	Kelowna CC, Kelowna Skip: Lesley Cmolik; Third: Joyce Smart; Second: Janet Thompson; Lead: Marnie Robertson	Wildewood Ladies CC, Winnipeg Skip: Peggy Casselman; Third: Val Taylor; Second: Pat MacDonald; Lead: Pat Scott	Bathurst CC, Bathurst Skip: Joan Callaghan; Third: Anne Orser; Second: Shirley Pilson; Lead: Geraldine Lenihan	Goose Bay CC, Goose Bay Skip: Bobbie Fortune; Third: Florence Stoddard; Second: Pat Cameron; Lead: Elsie Farquhar
Nova Scotia	Ontario	Prince Edward Island	Quebec	Saskatchewan
Liverpool CC, Liverpool Skip: Audrey Thorbourne; Third: Marina Wood; Second: Anne Boudreau; Lead: Helen Young	Dixie CC, Cooksville Skip: Fern Irwin; Third: Regina Johnson; Second: Erva Law; Lead: Fern McDonald	Charlottetown CC, Charlottetown Skip: Sybil MacMillan; Third: Marjorie Stewart; Second: Jennie Boomhower; Lead: Janet Douglas	Dolbeau CC, Dolbeau Skip: Solange Larouche; Third: Jeanne d'Arc Drumoulin; Second: Rita DeMarchi; Lead: Cecile Bonenfant	Delisle CC, Delisle Skip: Barbara MacNevin; Third: Fay Coben; Second: Florence Hill; Lead: Avis Carr

== Map of teams ==
Provincial Winners

== Round robin standings ==
Final Round Robin standings

Key
Diamond D champion

Province	Skip	W	L	PF	PA
Manitoba	Peggy Casselman	8	1	94	57
Alberta	Dorothy Thompson	7	2	84	49
Nova Scotia	Audrey Thorbourne	6	3	79	67
Ontario	Fern Irwin	5	4	86	81
British Columbia	Lesley Cmolik	4	5	67	88
Quebec	Solange Larouche	4	5	84	77
Saskatchewan	Barbara MacNevin	4	5	69	70
Prince Edward Island	Sybil MacMillan	4	5	75	79
New Brunswick	Joan Callaghan	2	7	66	86
Newfoundland	Bobbie Fortune	1	8	55	110

== Round robin results ==
All draw times are listed in Atlantic Standard Time (UTC−04:00).

=== Draw 1 ===
Monday, February 22, 3:00 pm

Team	1	2	3	4	5	6	7	8	9	10	Final
British Columbia (Cmolik)	1	2	0	3	0	0	0	1	0	X	7
Nova Scotia (Thorbourne)	0	0	2	0	2	5	1	0	2	X	12

Team	1	2	3	4	5	6	7	8	9	10	Final
Prince Edward Island (MacMillan)	0	1	3	2	2	2	0	1	1	2	14
Newfoundland (Fortune)	4	0	0	0	0	0	1	0	0	0	5

Team	1	2	3	4	5	6	7	8	9	10	Final
Saskatchewan (MacNevin)	0	1	0	3	0	0	2	0	0	0	6
Quebec (Larouche)	3	0	5	0	2	1	0	1	1	2	15

Team	1	2	3	4	5	6	7	8	9	10	Final
Ontario (Irwin)	0	1	0	1	0	0	3	0	1	2	8
Manitoba (Casselman)	2	0	1	0	2	1	0	1	0	0	7

Team	1	2	3	4	5	6	7	8	9	10	Final
New Brunswick (Callaghan)	2	0	0	0	0	2	0	3	0	0	7
Alberta (Thompson)	0	1	1	1	2	0	3	0	1	1	10

=== Draw 2 ===
Monday, February 22, 8:00 pm

Team	1	2	3	4	5	6	7	8	9	10	Final
Prince Edward Island (MacMillan)	0	4	0	0	0	0	0	1	3	1	9
British Columbia (Cmolik)	1	0	1	1	1	1	1	0	0	0	6

Team	1	2	3	4	5	6	7	8	9	10	Final
Manitoba (Casselman)	0	0	2	3	0	1	2	0	1	0	9
Nova Scotia (Thorbourne)	2	1	0	0	1	0	0	1	0	2	7

Team	1	2	3	4	5	6	7	8	9	10	Final
New Brunswick (Callaghan)	0	1	0	1	0	0	1	0	0	0	3
Saskatchewan (MacNevin)	1	0	2	0	0	2	0	5	1	2	13

Team	1	2	3	4	5	6	7	8	9	10	Final
Newfoundland (Fortune)	0	2	0	1	0	0	3	1	0	0	7
Quebec (Larouche)	2	0	2	0	3	2	0	0	1	2	12

Team	1	2	3	4	5	6	7	8	9	10	Final
Ontario (Irwin)	3	0	0	1	1	0	1	0	6	X	12
Alberta (Thompson)	0	1	3	0	0	1	0	4	0	X	9

=== Draw 3 ===
Tuesday, February 23, 2:30 pm

Team	1	2	3	4	5	6	7	8	9	10	Final
British Columbia (Cmolik)	0	0	0	0	0	0	2	0	0	X	2
Alberta (Thompson)	1	2	1	3	1	1	0	2	3	X	14

Team	1	2	3	4	5	6	7	8	9	10	Final
Prince Edward Island (MacMillan)	0	0	1	0	2	3	0	1	0	0	7
Manitoba (Casselman)	1	1	0	1	0	0	3	0	5	1	12

Team	1	2	3	4	5	6	7	8	9	10	Final
New Brunswick (Callaghan)	0	0	2	0	0	1	0	3	0	2	8
Newfoundland (Fortune)	3	0	0	4	3	0	1	0	1	0	12

Team	1	2	3	4	5	6	7	8	9	10	Final
Saskatchewan (MacNevin)	2	0	1	0	0	1	1	0	0	0	5
Nova Scotia (Thorbourne)	0	1	0	1	2	0	0	1	0	3	8

Team	1	2	3	4	5	6	7	8	9	10	11	Final
Ontario (Irwin)	0	4	0	3	0	1	1	1	0	1	2	13
Quebec (Larouche)	4	0	3	0	1	0	0	0	3	0	0	11

=== Draw 4 ===
Tuesday, February 23, 7:30 pm

Team	1	2	3	4	5	6	7	8	9	10	Final
British Columbia (Cmolik)	0	4	4	0	0	0	2	2	2	0	14
Newfoundland (Fortune)	2	0	0	3	1	2	0	0	0	2	10

Team	1	2	3	4	5	6	7	8	9	10	Final
New Brunswick (Callaghan)	3	0	0	0	0	3	1	0	0	1	8
Manitoba (Casselman)	0	3	1	4	1	0	0	2	1	0	12

Team	1	2	3	4	5	6	7	8	9	10	Final
Saskatchewan (MacNevin)	0	0	1	0	0	1	2	0	0	0	4
Alberta (Thompson)	1	2	0	0	2	0	0	3	3	1	12

Team	1	2	3	4	5	6	7	8	9	10	Final
Prince Edward Island (MacMillan)	0	3	0	5	0	0	0	1	0	0	9
Ontario (Irwin)	1	0	1	0	3	2	2	0	3	1	13

Team	1	2	3	4	5	6	7	8	9	10	Final
Nova Scotia (Thorbourne)	0	1	2	0	2	0	0	0	1	2	8
Quebec (Larouche)	1	0	0	2	0	1	1	1	0	0	6

=== Draw 5 ===
Wednesday, February 24, 9:00 am

Team	1	2	3	4	5	6	7	8	9	10	Final
British Columbia (Cmolik)	1	0	0	0	0	2	1	0	1	X	5
Manitoba (Casselman)	0	3	2	3	1	0	0	1	0	X	10

Team	1	2	3	4	5	6	7	8	9	10	Final
Prince Edward Island (MacMillan)	0	0	1	0	0	2	2	0	0	X	5
Saskatchewan (MacNevin)	5	1	0	3	1	0	0	2	2	X	14

Team	1	2	3	4	5	6	7	8	9	10	Final
Newfoundland (Fortune)	0	0	2	2	0	0	0	1	0	2	7
Nova Scotia (Thorbourne)	1	2	0	0	1	3	2	0	2	0	11

Team	1	2	3	4	5	6	7	8	9	10	Final
New Brunswick (Callaghan)	3	0	1	1	1	1	0	0	1	1	9
Ontario (Irwin)	0	2	0	0	0	0	2	2	0	0	6

Team	1	2	3	4	5	6	7	8	9	10	Final
Alberta (Thompson)	0	0	0	0	2	0	0	2	1	2	7
Quebec (Larouche)	1	1	1	1	0	1	1	0	0	0	6

=== Draw 6 ===
Wednesday, February 24, 3:00 pm

Team	1	2	3	4	5	6	7	8	9	10	Final
Manitoba (Casselman)	2	2	0	1	0	3	0	0	1	1	10
Quebec (Larouche)	0	0	1	0	4	0	1	1	0	0	7

Team	1	2	3	4	5	6	7	8	9	10	Final
Newfoundland (Fortune)	0	0	1	0	1	0	0	1	0	0	3
Alberta (Thompson)	1	1	0	3	0	2	1	0	3	3	14

Team	1	2	3	4	5	6	7	8	9	10	Final
British Columbia (Cmolik)	0	0	2	1	1	0	3	0	1	X	8
Saskatchewan (MacNevin)	0	1	0	0	0	1	0	1	0	X	3

Team	1	2	3	4	5	6	7	8	9	10	Final
Prince Edward Island (MacMillan)	2	2	1	0	0	1	1	0	0	1	8
New Brunswick (Callaghan)	0	0	0	2	1	0	0	1	1	0	5

Team	1	2	3	4	5	6	7	8	9	10	Final
Ontario (Irwin)	0	0	5	0	0	1	0	2	0	X	8
Nova Scotia (Thorbourne)	1	2	0	2	1	0	2	0	4	X	12

=== Draw 7 ===
Wednesday, February 24, 8:00 pm

Team	1	2	3	4	5	6	7	8	9	10	Final
Ontario (Irwin)	2	2	3	1	1	0	1	0	1	X	11
Newfoundland (Fortune)	0	0	0	0	0	1	0	1	0	X	2

Team	1	2	3	4	5	6	7	8	9	10	Final
Saskatchewan (MacNevin)	0	3	0	0	0	1	0	1	0	X	5
Manitoba (Casselman)	1	0	1	1	1	0	2	0	4	X	10

Team	1	2	3	4	5	6	7	8	9	10	Final
New Brunswick (Callaghan)	0	0	0	3	0	0	2	0	0	0	5
Nova Scotia (Thorbourne)	1	2	2	0	1	1	0	1	2	1	11

Team	1	2	3	4	5	6	7	8	9	10	Final
British Columbia (Cmolik)	1	0	0	3	0	0	1	0	1	3	9
Quebec (Larouche)	0	1	1	0	1	3	0	2	0	0	8

Team	1	2	3	4	5	6	7	8	9	10	Final
Prince Edward Island (MacMillan)	1	1	1	0	0	0	0	1	2	X	6
Alberta (Thompson)	0	0	0	3	2	1	1	0	0	X	7

=== Draw 8 ===
Thursday, February 25, 9:00 am

Team	1	2	3	4	5	6	7	8	9	10	Final
New Brunswick (Callaghan)	1	0	0	3	1	2	2	1	2	X	12
British Columbia (Cmolik)	0	2	2	0	0	0	0	0	0	X	4

Team	1	2	3	4	5	6	7	8	9	10	Final
Manitoba (Casselman)	0	1	1	2	0	2	4	4	3	X	17
Newfoundland (Fortune)	1	0	0	0	4	0	0	0	0	X	5

Team	1	2	3	4	5	6	7	8	9	10	Final
Saskatchewan (MacNevin)	0	2	0	0	4	0	2	0	2	X	10
Ontario (Irwin)	0	0	0	1	0	2	0	2	0	X	5

Team	1	2	3	4	5	6	7	8	9	10	Final
Alberta (Thompson)	1	2	1	2	1	0	0	1	3	X	11
Nova Scotia (Thorbourne)	0	0	0	0	0	1	1	0	0	X	2

Team	1	2	3	4	5	6	7	8	9	10	Final
Prince Edward Island (MacMillan)	0	0	2	0	1	0	3	0	1	1	8
Quebec (Larouche)	3	3	0	1	0	1	0	1	0	0	9

=== Draw 9 ===
Thursday, February 25, 7:30 pm

Team	1	2	3	4	5	6	7	8	9	10	Final
Saskatchewan (MacNevin)	1	2	0	1	0	1	1	1	0	2	9
Newfoundland (Fortune)	0	0	1	0	2	0	0	0	1	0	4

Team	1	2	3	4	5	6	7	8	9	10	Final
Prince Edward Island (MacMillan)	0	1	0	1	1	0	3	0	0	3	9
Nova Scotia (Thorbourne)	1	0	2	0	0	1	0	3	1	0	8

Team	1	2	3	4	5	6	7	8	9	10	Final
British Columbia (Cmolik)	1	0	0	3	0	4	0	0	2	2	12
Ontario (Irwin)	0	2	2	0	4	0	1	1	0	0	10

Team	1	2	3	4	5	6	7	8	9	10	Final
New Brunswick (Callaghan)	1	0	2	0	0	2	2	0	0	2	9
Quebec (Larouche)	0	3	0	2	1	0	0	1	3	0	10

Team	1	2	3	4	5	6	7	8	9	10	Final
Manitoba (Casselman)	1	2	2	1	0	0	0	1	0	X	7
Alberta (Thompson)	0	0	0	0	2	2	0	0	1	X	5
