= 1971 Macdonald Brier =

- Host city: Quebec City, Quebec
- Arena: Pavilion de la Jeunesse
- Dates: March 1–6
- Attendance: 8,501
- Winner: Manitoba
- Curling club: Granite CC, Winnipeg
- Skip: Don Duguid
- Third: Rod Hunter
- Second: Jim Pettapiece
- Lead: Bryan Wood
- Finalist: Northern Ontario (Tetley); Saskatchewan (Pickering)

The 1971 Macdonald Brier, Canada's national men's curling championship was held March 1–6 at the 2,800 seat Pavilion de la Jeunesse in Quebec City, Quebec.

A blizzard hit the city late in the week, and was blamed for low attendance. One draw had to be cancelled due to the blizzard, and curlers had to be shuttled from the rink to their hotels on snowmobiles.

Manitoba, Northern Ontario, and Saskatchewan all finished round robin play with 8-2 records, necessitating a tiebreaker playoff between the three teams to determine the Brier championship. Despite Saskatchewan defeating both Manitoba and Northern Ontario in round robin play, lots were drawn to determine the seeds. Team Manitoba won the draw and were given a bye into the final.

Team Manitoba, who was skipped by Don Duguid ended up capturing the Brier Tankard by beating Northern Ontario in the final 11-6 as Northern Ontario skip Bill Tetley conceded in the final end. Northern Ontario earlier advanced to the final with a 10-9 victory over Saskatchewan. This was the fourth time in Brier history in which a three-way tiebreaker determined the championship with the other instances being in 1928, 1946, and 1962. This was also the last tiebreaker playoff to determine a champion prior to the institution of the playoffs in 1980.

This was Manitoba's eighteenth Brier championship overall. Duguid became only the fifth skip to ever win back-to-back Briers joining Gordon Hudson, Matt Baldwin, Ernie Richardson (twice), and Ron Northcott to ever accomplish that feat. Duguid's team (Rod Hunter, Jim Pettapiece, and Bryan Wood) joined Richardson's 1959 and 1960 teams as they only rinks to have won back-to-back Briers with the same four team members.

Duguid's rink would represent Canada in the 1971 Air Canada Silver Broom, which was the men's world curling championship in which they also defended their title from the previous year.

After winning the 1971 World Championship, Duguid retired from competitive curling, and joined the CBC in 1972 as a curling commentator.

== Teams ==
| Alberta | British Columbia | Manitoba |
|---|---|---|
| Derrick G&WC, Edmonton Skip: Matt Baldwin; Third: Tom Kroeger; Second: Rich Cust; Lead: Reg Van Wassenhove | Prince George CC, Prince George Skip: Kevin Smale; Third: Pete Sherba; Second: Pat Carr; Lead: Bob McDonald | Granite CC, Winnipeg Skip: Don Duguid; Third: Rod Hunter; Second: Jim Pettapiece; Lead: Bryan Wood |
| New Brunswick | Newfoundland | Northern Ontario |
| Beausejour CC, Moncton Skip: Paul Bordage; Third: Art Gillard; Second: Dale Somers; Lead: Murray Leger | St. John's CC, St. John's Skip: Bob Cole; Third: Les Bowering; Second: Ken Ellis; Lead: Alex Andrews | Thunder Bay CC, Thunder Bay Skip: Bill Tetley; Third: Frank Sargent; Second: Jim Sargent; Lead: Eric Knudson |
| Nova Scotia | Ontario | Prince Edward Island |
| Truro CC, Truro Skip: Frank Hoar; Third: Doug Carter; Second: John Sanford; Lead: Don Fulton | Avonlea CC, Don Mills Skip: Bob Charlebois; Third: Rich Palmer; Second: Ray Lilly; Lead: Jim McGrath | Charlottetown CC, Charlottetown Skip: Kip Ready; Third: Bill MacGregor; Second: David Kassner; Lead: Norm MacNeill |
| Quebec | Saskatchewan |
| Outremont CC, Outremont Skip: Bill Ott; Third: Tom Fisher; Second: Herb Miyashita; Lead: John Walling | Avonlea CC, Avonlea Skip: Bob Pickering; Third: Garnet Campbell; Second: John Keys; Lead: Gary Ford |

== Map of teams ==
Provincial Winners

== Round-robin standings ==
Key
| Teams to Tiebreaker |

| Province | Skip | W | L | PF | PA |
|---|---|---|---|---|---|
| Saskatchewan | Bob Pickering | 8 | 2 | 104 | 80 |
| Northern Ontario | Bill Tetley | 8 | 2 | 103 | 81 |
| Manitoba | Don Duguid | 8 | 2 | 109 | 64 |
| Alberta | Matt Baldwin | 5 | 5 | 92 | 98 |
| British Columbia | Kevin Smale | 5 | 5 | 103 | 88 |
| Ontario | Bob Charlebois | 5 | 5 | 89 | 101 |
| Newfoundland | Bob Cole | 4 | 6 | 89 | 93 |
| Prince Edward Island | Kip Ready | 4 | 6 | 99 | 97 |
| Nova Scotia | Frank Hoar | 3 | 7 | 85 | 111 |
| New Brunswick | Paul Bordage | 3 | 7 | 83 | 102 |
| Quebec | Bill Ott | 2 | 8 | 80 | 121 |

== Round-robin results ==
All draw times are listed in Eastern Time (UTC−05:00)

=== Draw 1 ===
Monday, March 1, 3:00 pm

| Team | 1 | 2 | 3 | 4 | 5 | 6 | 7 | 8 | 9 | 10 | 11 | 12 | Final |
| Prince Edward Island (Ready) | 0 | 2 | 0 | 1 | 0 | 0 | 2 | 0 | 1 | 0 | 2 | 2 | 10 |
| Quebec (Ott) | 1 | 0 | 4 | 0 | 2 | 2 | 0 | 1 | 0 | 1 | 0 | 0 | 11 |

| Team | 1 | 2 | 3 | 4 | 5 | 6 | 7 | 8 | 9 | 10 | 11 | 12 | Final |
| Nova Scotia (Hoar) | 0 | 1 | 1 | 1 | 0 | 1 | 0 | 0 | 2 | 0 | 1 | 0 | 7 |
| Saskatchewan (Pickering) | 3 | 0 | 0 | 0 | 1 | 0 | 1 | 1 | 0 | 1 | 0 | 1 | 8 |

| Team | 1 | 2 | 3 | 4 | 5 | 6 | 7 | 8 | 9 | 10 | 11 | 12 | Final |
| Newfoundland (Cole) | 0 | 0 | 1 | 0 | 3 | 2 | 1 | 1 | 0 | 0 | 0 | 0 | 8 |
| British Columbia (Smale) | 2 | 1 | 0 | 1 | 0 | 0 | 0 | 0 | 3 | 1 | 1 | 2 | 11 |

| Team | 1 | 2 | 3 | 4 | 5 | 6 | 7 | 8 | 9 | 10 | 11 | 12 | Final |
| Ontario (Charlebois) | 0 | 0 | 0 | 3 | 0 | 1 | 0 | 0 | 1 | 0 | 2 | 0 | 7 |
| Manitoba (Duguid) | 0 | 1 | 1 | 0 | 2 | 0 | 2 | 2 | 0 | 3 | 0 | 2 | 13 |

| Team | 1 | 2 | 3 | 4 | 5 | 6 | 7 | 8 | 9 | 10 | 11 | 12 | Final |
| New Brunswick (Bordage) | 0 | 0 | 1 | 0 | 0 | 0 | 1 | 0 | 2 | 0 | 0 | 3 | 7 |
| Alberta (Baldwin) | 2 | 1 | 0 | 2 | 2 | 1 | 0 | 2 | 0 | 1 | 2 | 0 | 13 |

=== Draw 2 ===
Monday, March 1, 8:00 pm

| Team | 1 | 2 | 3 | 4 | 5 | 6 | 7 | 8 | 9 | 10 | 11 | 12 | 13 | Final |
| Ontario (Charlebois) | 1 | 0 | 3 | 1 | 0 | 2 | 1 | 0 | 0 | 2 | 0 | 0 | 3 | 13 |
| Newfoundland (Cole) | 0 | 4 | 0 | 0 | 1 | 0 | 0 | 3 | 0 | 0 | 1 | 1 | 0 | 10 |

| Team | 1 | 2 | 3 | 4 | 5 | 6 | 7 | 8 | 9 | 10 | 11 | 12 | Final |
| Saskatchewan (Pickering) | 2 | 1 | 3 | 1 | 0 | 1 | 0 | 2 | 0 | 4 | 0 | 0 | 14 |
| Alberta (Baldwin) | 0 | 0 | 0 | 0 | 2 | 0 | 4 | 0 | 1 | 0 | 1 | 1 | 9 |

| Team | 1 | 2 | 3 | 4 | 5 | 6 | 7 | 8 | 9 | 10 | 11 | 12 | 13 | Final |
| New Brunswick (Bordage) | 0 | 4 | 0 | 1 | 2 | 1 | 0 | 3 | 0 | 1 | 0 | 1 | 0 | 13 |
| Prince Edward Island (Ready) | 2 | 0 | 3 | 0 | 0 | 0 | 2 | 0 | 1 | 0 | 5 | 0 | 1 | 14 |

| Team | 1 | 2 | 3 | 4 | 5 | 6 | 7 | 8 | 9 | 10 | 11 | 12 | Final |
| Northern Ontario (Tetley) | 2 | 0 | 1 | 1 | 0 | 1 | 0 | 3 | 0 | 3 | 0 | 1 | 12 |
| Quebec (Ott) | 0 | 3 | 0 | 0 | 1 | 0 | 3 | 0 | 1 | 0 | 1 | 0 | 9 |

| Team | 1 | 2 | 3 | 4 | 5 | 6 | 7 | 8 | 9 | 10 | 11 | 12 | Final |
| Nova Scotia (Hoar) | 2 | 0 | 1 | 0 | 1 | 0 | 0 | 1 | 0 | 1 | 0 | 0 | 6 |
| British Columbia (Smale) | 0 | 1 | 0 | 2 | 0 | 3 | 2 | 0 | 4 | 0 | 2 | 2 | 16 |

=== Draw 3 ===
Tuesday, March 2, 9:00 am

| Team | 1 | 2 | 3 | 4 | 5 | 6 | 7 | 8 | 9 | 10 | 11 | 12 | Final |
| Northern Ontario (Tetley) | 1 | 1 | 0 | 2 | 1 | 2 | 0 | 0 | 4 | 2 | 0 | 1 | 14 |
| New Brunswick (Bordage) | 0 | 0 | 3 | 0 | 0 | 0 | 2 | 0 | 0 | 0 | 1 | 0 | 6 |

| Team | 1 | 2 | 3 | 4 | 5 | 6 | 7 | 8 | 9 | 10 | 11 | 12 | Final |
| Alberta (Baldwin) | 1 | 0 | 2 | 0 | 0 | 1 | 0 | 0 | 1 | 0 | 0 | 2 | 7 |
| British Columbia (Smale) | 0 | 2 | 0 | 2 | 1 | 0 | 1 | 3 | 0 | 4 | 3 | 0 | 16 |

| Team | 1 | 2 | 3 | 4 | 5 | 6 | 7 | 8 | 9 | 10 | 11 | 12 | 13 | Final |
| Nova Scotia (Hoar) | 1 | 0 | 2 | 0 | 0 | 1 | 1 | 0 | 4 | 0 | 0 | 1 | 0 | 10 |
| Ontario (Charlebois) | 0 | 1 | 0 | 2 | 1 | 0 | 0 | 2 | 0 | 3 | 1 | 0 | 4 | 14 |

| Team | 1 | 2 | 3 | 4 | 5 | 6 | 7 | 8 | 9 | 10 | 11 | 12 | Final |
| Manitoba (Duguid) | 2 | 2 | 0 | 0 | 2 | 0 | 0 | 2 | 0 | 1 | 0 | 1 | 10 |
| Newfoundland (Cole) | 0 | 0 | 0 | 1 | 0 | 2 | 1 | 0 | 1 | 0 | 1 | 0 | 6 |

| Team | 1 | 2 | 3 | 4 | 5 | 6 | 7 | 8 | 9 | 10 | 11 | 12 | Final |
| Saskatchewan (Pickering) | 0 | 0 | 2 | 0 | 1 | 0 | 0 | 0 | 2 | 0 | 1 | 0 | 6 |
| Prince Edward Island (Ready) | 1 | 1 | 0 | 1 | 0 | 0 | 1 | 1 | 0 | 1 | 0 | 2 | 8 |

=== Draw 4 ===
Tuesday, March 2, 2:30 pm

| Team | 1 | 2 | 3 | 4 | 5 | 6 | 7 | 8 | 9 | 10 | 11 | 12 | Final |
| Manitoba (Duguid) | 2 | 1 | 0 | 1 | 0 | 4 | 1 | 0 | 2 | 0 | 0 | 0 | 11 |
| Nova Scotia (Hoar) | 0 | 0 | 1 | 0 | 1 | 0 | 0 | 2 | 0 | 2 | 0 | 0 | 6 |

| Team | 1 | 2 | 3 | 4 | 5 | 6 | 7 | 8 | 9 | 10 | 11 | 12 | Final |
| British Columbia (Smale) | 0 | 0 | 3 | 2 | 0 | 1 | 0 | 1 | 1 | 0 | 2 | 1 | 11 |
| Prince Edward Island (Ready) | 1 | 3 | 0 | 0 | 2 | 0 | 1 | 0 | 0 | 2 | 0 | 0 | 9 |

| Team | 1 | 2 | 3 | 4 | 5 | 6 | 7 | 8 | 9 | 10 | 11 | 12 | Final |
| Saskatchewan (Pickering) | 3 | 1 | 1 | 2 | 1 | 0 | 2 | 0 | 0 | 1 | 0 | 0 | 11 |
| Northern Ontario (Tetley) | 0 | 0 | 0 | 0 | 0 | 2 | 0 | 1 | 0 | 0 | 1 | 3 | 7 |

| Team | 1 | 2 | 3 | 4 | 5 | 6 | 7 | 8 | 9 | 10 | 11 | 12 | Final |
| Quebec (Ott) | 2 | 0 | 2 | 0 | 0 | 1 | 0 | 0 | 1 | 0 | 1 | 0 | 7 |
| New Brunswick (Bordage) | 0 | 1 | 0 | 3 | 1 | 0 | 3 | 1 | 0 | 2 | 0 | 1 | 12 |

| Team | 1 | 2 | 3 | 4 | 5 | 6 | 7 | 8 | 9 | 10 | 11 | 12 | Final |
| Alberta (Baldwin) | 1 | 0 | 1 | 0 | 0 | 2 | 0 | 0 | 1 | 0 | 0 | 2 | 7 |
| Ontario (Charlebois) | 0 | 1 | 0 | 2 | 1 | 0 | 1 | 1 | 0 | 1 | 4 | 0 | 11 |

=== Draw 5 ===
Wednesday, March 3, 2:30 pm

| Team | 1 | 2 | 3 | 4 | 5 | 6 | 7 | 8 | 9 | 10 | 11 | 12 | Final |
| Quebec (Ott) | 0 | 2 | 0 | 2 | 0 | 0 | 1 | 0 | 1 | 2 | 6 | 0 | 14 |
| Saskatchewan (Pickering) | 1 | 0 | 1 | 0 | 2 | 2 | 0 | 3 | 0 | 0 | 0 | 2 | 11 |

| Team | 1 | 2 | 3 | 4 | 5 | 6 | 7 | 8 | 9 | 10 | 11 | 12 | Final |
| Prince Edward Island (Ready) | 1 | 3 | 0 | 4 | 1 | 0 | 1 | 3 | 0 | 1 | 0 | 0 | 14 |
| Ontario (Charlebois) | 0 | 0 | 1 | 0 | 0 | 2 | 0 | 0 | 1 | 0 | 0 | 0 | 4 |

| Team | 1 | 2 | 3 | 4 | 5 | 6 | 7 | 8 | 9 | 10 | 11 | 12 | Final |
| Alberta (Baldwin) | 1 | 1 | 0 | 0 | 0 | 0 | 0 | 1 | 0 | 0 | 2 | 0 | 5 |
| Manitoba (Duguid) | 0 | 0 | 0 | 1 | 1 | 1 | 0 | 0 | 1 | 0 | 0 | 2 | 6 |

| Team | 1 | 2 | 3 | 4 | 5 | 6 | 7 | 8 | 9 | 10 | 11 | 12 | Final |
| Newfoundland (Cole) | 3 | 0 | 1 | 0 | 2 | 0 | 4 | 0 | 1 | 2 | 0 | 1 | 14 |
| Nova Scotia (Hoar) | 0 | 1 | 0 | 3 | 0 | 1 | 0 | 1 | 0 | 0 | 0 | 0 | 6 |

| Team | 1 | 2 | 3 | 4 | 5 | 6 | 7 | 8 | 9 | 10 | 11 | 12 | 13 | Final |
| British Columbia (Smale) | 2 | 1 | 0 | 2 | 0 | 3 | 0 | 2 | 0 | 1 | 0 | 1 | 0 | 12 |
| Northern Ontario (Tetley) | 0 | 0 | 2 | 0 | 3 | 0 | 3 | 0 | 2 | 0 | 2 | 0 | 1 | 13 |

=== Draw 6 ===
Wednesday, March 3, 8:00 pm

| Team | 1 | 2 | 3 | 4 | 5 | 6 | 7 | 8 | 9 | 10 | 11 | 12 | Final |
| New Brunswick (Bordage) | 0 | 1 | 2 | 0 | 0 | 1 | 0 | 0 | 0 | 1 | 0 | 0 | 5 |
| Saskatchewan (Pickering) | 2 | 0 | 0 | 1 | 3 | 0 | 0 | 2 | 3 | 0 | 0 | 3 | 14 |

| Team | 1 | 2 | 3 | 4 | 5 | 6 | 7 | 8 | 9 | 10 | 11 | 12 | Final |
| British Columbia (Smale) | 2 | 0 | 2 | 0 | 1 | 0 | 0 | 0 | 1 | 2 | 0 | 1 | 9 |
| Quebec (Ott) | 0 | 1 | 0 | 1 | 0 | 1 | 1 | 1 | 0 | 0 | 1 | 0 | 6 |

| Team | 1 | 2 | 3 | 4 | 5 | 6 | 7 | 8 | 9 | 10 | 11 | 12 | Final |
| Prince Edward Island (Ready) | 1 | 0 | 0 | 3 | 1 | 0 | 1 | 0 | 0 | 0 | 0 | 0 | 6 |
| Manitoba (Duguid) | 0 | 2 | 0 | 0 | 0 | 3 | 0 | 2 | 3 | 1 | 2 | 3 | 16 |

| Team | 1 | 2 | 3 | 4 | 5 | 6 | 7 | 8 | 9 | 10 | 11 | 12 | Final |
| Ontario (Charlebois) | 0 | 1 | 0 | 0 | 0 | 2 | 0 | 0 | 0 | 0 | 1 | 0 | 4 |
| Northern Ontario (Tetley) | 1 | 0 | 3 | 0 | 1 | 0 | 0 | 3 | 1 | 0 | 0 | 1 | 10 |

| Team | 1 | 2 | 3 | 4 | 5 | 6 | 7 | 8 | 9 | 10 | 11 | 12 | Final |
| Newfoundland (Cole) | 0 | 0 | 1 | 2 | 0 | 2 | 0 | 0 | 1 | 0 | 0 | 2 | 8 |
| Alberta (Baldwin) | 1 | 2 | 0 | 0 | 1 | 0 | 1 | 3 | 0 | 0 | 2 | 0 | 10 |

=== Draw 7 ===
Thursday, March 4, 9:00 am

| Team | 1 | 2 | 3 | 4 | 5 | 6 | 7 | 8 | 9 | 10 | 11 | 12 | Final |
| New Brunswick (Bordage) | 1 | 1 | 1 | 0 | 2 | 1 | 0 | 0 | 0 | 1 | 0 | 1 | 8 |
| British Columbia (Smale) | 0 | 0 | 0 | 1 | 0 | 0 | 1 | 1 | 1 | 0 | 3 | 0 | 7 |

| Team | 1 | 2 | 3 | 4 | 5 | 6 | 7 | 8 | 9 | 10 | 11 | 12 | Final |
| Northern Ontario (Tetley) | 0 | 1 | 1 | 0 | 0 | 2 | 0 | 0 | 1 | 1 | 1 | 0 | 7 |
| Manitoba (Duguid) | 0 | 0 | 0 | 0 | 2 | 0 | 2 | 1 | 0 | 0 | 0 | 1 | 6 |

| Team | 1 | 2 | 3 | 4 | 5 | 6 | 7 | 8 | 9 | 10 | 11 | 12 | Final |
| Prince Edward Island (Ready) | 0 | 0 | 0 | 4 | 0 | 1 | 0 | 2 | 0 | 0 | 2 | 0 | 9 |
| Newfoundland (Cole) | 1 | 0 | 1 | 0 | 2 | 0 | 1 | 0 | 1 | 1 | 0 | 3 | 10 |

| Team | 1 | 2 | 3 | 4 | 5 | 6 | 7 | 8 | 9 | 10 | 11 | 12 | Final |
| Nova Scotia (Hoar) | 0 | 1 | 0 | 2 | 0 | 1 | 0 | 0 | 1 | 0 | 1 | 0 | 6 |
| Alberta (Baldwin) | 2 | 0 | 3 | 0 | 2 | 0 | 2 | 0 | 0 | 1 | 0 | 1 | 11 |

| Team | 1 | 2 | 3 | 4 | 5 | 6 | 7 | 8 | 9 | 10 | 11 | 12 | Final |
| Ontario (Charlebois) | 0 | 3 | 0 | 2 | 0 | 2 | 0 | 1 | 0 | 5 | 0 | 1 | 14 |
| Quebec (Ott) | 1 | 0 | 1 | 0 | 1 | 0 | 1 | 0 | 1 | 0 | 1 | 0 | 6 |

=== Draw 8 ===
Thursday, March 4, 2:30 pm

| Team | 1 | 2 | 3 | 4 | 5 | 6 | 7 | 8 | 9 | 10 | 11 | 12 | Final |
| Nova Scotia (Hoar) | 0 | 1 | 0 | 0 | 0 | 3 | 2 | 0 | 2 | 2 | 0 | 1 | 11 |
| Prince Edward Island (Ready) | 1 | 0 | 1 | 3 | 1 | 0 | 0 | 1 | 0 | 0 | 3 | 0 | 10 |

| Team | 1 | 2 | 3 | 4 | 5 | 6 | 7 | 8 | 9 | 10 | 11 | 12 | Final |
| Manitoba (Duguid) | 1 | 0 | 1 | 2 | 0 | 5 | 4 | 0 | 2 | 3 | 0 | 0 | 18 |
| Quebec (Ott) | 0 | 1 | 0 | 0 | 1 | 0 | 0 | 3 | 0 | 0 | 2 | 0 | 7 |

| Team | 1 | 2 | 3 | 4 | 5 | 6 | 7 | 8 | 9 | 10 | 11 | 12 | Final |
| Ontario (Charlebois) | 1 | 1 | 0 | 0 | 0 | 0 | 0 | 1 | 1 | 0 | 0 | 0 | 4 |
| New Brunswick (Bordage) | 0 | 0 | 1 | 2 | 1 | 2 | 2 | 0 | 0 | 1 | 1 | 2 | 12 |

| Team | 1 | 2 | 3 | 4 | 5 | 6 | 7 | 8 | 9 | 10 | 11 | 12 | Final |
| Northern Ontario (Tetley) | 1 | 0 | 1 | 2 | 0 | 2 | 1 | 0 | 3 | 1 | 0 | 0 | 11 |
| Newfoundland (Cole) | 0 | 1 | 0 | 0 | 0 | 0 | 0 | 1 | 0 | 0 | 2 | 3 | 7 |

| Team | 1 | 2 | 3 | 4 | 5 | 6 | 7 | 8 | 9 | 10 | 11 | 12 | Final |
| Saskatchewan (Pickering) | 1 | 0 | 3 | 1 | 0 | 0 | 1 | 1 | 0 | 2 | 0 | 1 | 10 |
| British Columbia (Smale) | 0 | 1 | 0 | 0 | 1 | 0 | 0 | 0 | 1 | 0 | 4 | 0 | 7 |

=== Draw 9 ===
Friday, March 5, 9:00 am (Note: A crippling blizzard forced the postponement of Draw 9 from Thursday evening to Friday morning. Draw 10 was pushed back from Friday morning to afternoon while Draw 11 was pushed back from Friday afternoon to evening.)

| Team | 1 | 2 | 3 | 4 | 5 | 6 | 7 | 8 | 9 | 10 | 11 | 12 | Final |
| Saskatchewan (Pickering) | 1 | 0 | 2 | 0 | 3 | 0 | 1 | 0 | 2 | 0 | 1 | 0 | 10 |
| Ontario (Charlebois) | 0 | 1 | 0 | 1 | 0 | 2 | 0 | 1 | 0 | 1 | 0 | 2 | 8 |

| Team | 1 | 2 | 3 | 4 | 5 | 6 | 7 | 8 | 9 | 10 | 11 | 12 | Final |
| Manitoba (Duguid) | 3 | 1 | 0 | 3 | 0 | 1 | 0 | 1 | 0 | 1 | 0 | 0 | 10 |
| New Brunswick (Bordage) | 0 | 0 | 1 | 0 | 0 | 0 | 2 | 0 | 1 | 0 | 1 | 1 | 6 |

| Team | 1 | 2 | 3 | 4 | 5 | 6 | 7 | 8 | 9 | 10 | 11 | 12 | 13 | Final |
| Alberta (Baldwin) | 0 | 2 | 0 | 0 | 2 | 0 | 1 | 0 | 2 | 2 | 1 | 0 | 1 | 11 |
| Prince Edward Island (Ready) | 3 | 0 | 0 | 2 | 0 | 2 | 0 | 2 | 0 | 0 | 0 | 1 | 0 | 10 |

| Team | 1 | 2 | 3 | 4 | 5 | 6 | 7 | 8 | 9 | 10 | 11 | 12 | Final |
| Northern Ontario (Tetley) | 5 | 0 | 1 | 0 | 0 | 0 | 1 | 0 | 2 | 0 | 2 | 0 | 11 |
| Nova Scotia (Hoar) | 0 | 1 | 0 | 1 | 1 | 1 | 0 | 1 | 0 | 1 | 0 | 1 | 7 |

| Team | 1 | 2 | 3 | 4 | 5 | 6 | 7 | 8 | 9 | 10 | 11 | 12 | Final |
| Quebec (Ott) | 0 | 0 | 2 | 0 | 1 | 0 | 0 | 2 | 1 | 0 | 0 | 1 | 7 |
| Newfoundland (Cole) | 2 | 0 | 0 | 2 | 0 | 3 | 1 | 0 | 0 | 2 | 1 | 0 | 11 |

=== Draw 10 ===
Friday, March 5, 2:30 pm

| Team | 1 | 2 | 3 | 4 | 5 | 6 | 7 | 8 | 9 | 10 | 11 | 12 | Final |
| Quebec (Ott) | 0 | 0 | 1 | 0 | 1 | 0 | 2 | 0 | 2 | 0 | 1 | 0 | 7 |
| Nova Scotia (Hoar) | 1 | 1 | 0 | 2 | 0 | 4 | 0 | 2 | 0 | 4 | 0 | 1 | 15 |

| Team | 1 | 2 | 3 | 4 | 5 | 6 | 7 | 8 | 9 | 10 | 11 | 12 | Final |
| Alberta (Baldwin) | 0 | 1 | 0 | 1 | 2 | 0 | 2 | 0 | 2 | 0 | 0 | 2 | 10 |
| Northern Ontario (Tetley) | 2 | 0 | 3 | 0 | 0 | 3 | 0 | 3 | 0 | 2 | 1 | 0 | 14 |

| Team | 1 | 2 | 3 | 4 | 5 | 6 | 7 | 8 | 9 | 10 | 11 | 12 | Final |
| Newfoundland (Cole) | 1 | 0 | 0 | 1 | 0 | 1 | 0 | 1 | 0 | 1 | 2 | 1 | 8 |
| New Brunswick (Bordage) | 0 | 1 | 1 | 0 | 1 | 0 | 1 | 0 | 1 | 0 | 0 | 0 | 5 |

| Team | 1 | 2 | 3 | 4 | 5 | 6 | 7 | 8 | 9 | 10 | 11 | 12 | 13 | Final |
| Manitoba (Duguid) | 0 | 0 | 1 | 0 | 1 | 0 | 0 | 2 | 1 | 0 | 2 | 1 | 0 | 8 |
| Saskatchewan (Pickering) | 2 | 2 | 0 | 2 | 0 | 0 | 1 | 0 | 0 | 1 | 0 | 0 | 1 | 9 |

| Team | 1 | 2 | 3 | 4 | 5 | 6 | 7 | 8 | 9 | 10 | 11 | 12 | Final |
| British Columbia (Smale) | 0 | 2 | 0 | 1 | 0 | 0 | 3 | 0 | 1 | 0 | 0 | 2 | 9 |
| Ontario (Charlebois) | 1 | 0 | 1 | 0 | 2 | 2 | 0 | 1 | 0 | 2 | 1 | 0 | 10 |

=== Draw 11 ===
Friday, March 5, 8:00 pm

| Team | 1 | 2 | 3 | 4 | 5 | 6 | 7 | 8 | 9 | 10 | 11 | 12 | Final |
| Quebec (Ott) | 0 | 1 | 0 | 0 | 1 | 0 | 0 | 2 | 1 | 0 | 0 | 1 | 6 |
| Alberta (Baldwin) | 1 | 0 | 2 | 1 | 0 | 2 | 1 | 0 | 0 | 1 | 1 | 0 | 9 |

| Team | 1 | 2 | 3 | 4 | 5 | 6 | 7 | 8 | 9 | 10 | 11 | 12 | Final |
| New Brunswick (Bordage) | 1 | 0 | 2 | 3 | 1 | 0 | 0 | 2 | 0 | 0 | 0 | 0 | 9 |
| Nova Scotia (Hoar) | 0 | 1 | 0 | 0 | 0 | 1 | 0 | 0 | 3 | 2 | 3 | 1 | 11 |

| Team | 1 | 2 | 3 | 4 | 5 | 6 | 7 | 8 | 9 | 10 | 11 | 12 | Final |
| British Columbia (Smale) | 0 | 1 | 0 | 1 | 1 | 0 | 0 | 1 | 0 | 1 | 0 | 0 | 5 |
| Manitoba (Duguid) | 1 | 0 | 1 | 0 | 0 | 1 | 1 | 0 | 5 | 0 | 1 | 1 | 11 |

| Team | 1 | 2 | 3 | 4 | 5 | 6 | 7 | 8 | 9 | 10 | 11 | 12 | Final |
| Newfoundland (Cole) | 0 | 2 | 0 | 1 | 0 | 2 | 0 | 1 | 0 | 0 | 1 | 0 | 7 |
| Saskatchewan (Pickering) | 2 | 0 | 1 | 0 | 2 | 0 | 1 | 0 | 1 | 1 | 0 | 3 | 11 |

| Team | 1 | 2 | 3 | 4 | 5 | 6 | 7 | 8 | 9 | 10 | 11 | 12 | Final |
| Prince Edward Island (Ready) | 1 | 0 | 1 | 0 | 1 | 1 | 1 | 0 | 1 | 0 | 3 | 0 | 9 |
| Northern Ontario (Tetley) | 0 | 0 | 0 | 2 | 0 | 0 | 0 | 2 | 0 | 0 | 0 | 0 | 4 |

== Tiebreakers ==
| Semifinal | | Final |
| | | Manitoba | 11 |
| Northern Ontario | 10 | Northern Ontario | 6 |
| Saskatchewan | 9 |

=== Semifinal ===
Saturday, March 6, 9:00 am

| Team | 1 | 2 | 3 | 4 | 5 | 6 | 7 | 8 | 9 | 10 | 11 | 12 | Final |
| Saskatchewan (Pickering) | 0 | 0 | 2 | 0 | 0 | 2 | 0 | 2 | 0 | 1 | 1 | 1 | 9 |
| Northern Ontario (Tetley) | 1 | 3 | 0 | 1 | 1 | 0 | 2 | 0 | 2 | 0 | 0 | 0 | 10 |

=== Final ===
Saturday, March 6, 1:00 pm

| Team | 1 | 2 | 3 | 4 | 5 | 6 | 7 | 8 | 9 | 10 | 11 | 12 | Final |
| Northern Ontario (Tetley) | 1 | 0 | 1 | 0 | 0 | 2 | 0 | 1 | 0 | 1 | 0 | X | 6 |
| Manitoba (Duguid) | 0 | 0 | 0 | 2 | 1 | 0 | 3 | 0 | 3 | 0 | 2 | X | 11 |

== Awards ==
=== All-Star Team ===
The media selected the following curlers as All-Stars.

| Position | Name | Team |
|---|---|---|
| Skip | Bill Tetley | Northern Ontario |
| Third | Rod Hunter | Manitoba |
| Second | Jim Pettapiece | Manitoba |
| Lead | Gary Ford (2) | Saskatchewan |

=== Ross G.L. Harstone Award ===
The Ross Harstone Award was presented to the player chosen by their fellow peers as the curler who best represented Harstone's high ideals of good sportsmanship, observance of the rules, exemplary conduct and curling ability.

| Name | Team | Position |
|---|---|---|
| Bob Pickering | Saskatchewan | Skip |
