= Barry Fry (curler) =

Canadian curler (1939–2021)

Medal record

Representing Canada

Men's Curling

World Championships
| Bronze medal – third place | 1979 Bern | |

Representing Manitoba

Macdonald Brier
| Gold medal – first place | 1979 Ottawa | |

Barry William "The Snake" Fry (December 21, 1939 – May 14, 2021) was a Canadian curler from Winnipeg, Manitoba. Fry was the skip of the 1979 Macdonald Brier champion team from Manitoba, and won a bronze medal at that year's world championship. He was the father of 2014 Olympic gold medallist Ryan Fry. Fry was nicknamed "The Snake" for his quick delivery from the hack.

== Curling career ==
Fry won his first national title in 1973, when he won the Canadian Mixed Curling Championship for Manitoba with teammates Peggy Casselman, Stephen Decter and Susan Lynch. The team finished with a 9–1 record. Fry, Casselman, Winston Warren and Helene Paton had previously won a provincial mixed title in 1970, and finished in third at the 1970 Canadian Mixed.

After 12 years, Fry finally won a Manitoba provincial men's title in 1979, with his new rink of Bill Carey, Gordon Sparkes and Bryan Wood, defeating Bill Paterson in the final. The team then represented Manitoba at the 1979 Macdonald Brier. At the Brier, the team prevailed through poor playing conditions using a conservative hitting style to win the championship. The team suffered just one loss at the Brier, to Saskatchewan's Rick Folk. Fry's 10-1 record was enough to finish in first place, while Folk's Saskatchewan team finished tied for second with an 8-3 record. The Brier win sent the Fry rink to the 1979 Air Canada Silver Broom, the World Curling Championships in Switzerland, representing Canada. At the Silver Broom, the team wrapped up the round robin with a 6-3 record, tied with three other countries in 2nd. The team lost to Norway's Kristian Sørum in their semi-final match up, settling for a bronze medal.

After 1979, Fry's only other Brier appearance came at the 1998 Labatt Brier as Manitoba's alternate. However, he did not play in a single match.

After turning 50, Fry graduated to Senior's curling. In 1992, Fry won the provincial senior's championships with teammates Don Duguid, Barry Coleman and Don McDonald. The team would go on to lose in the final of the 1992 Canadian Senior Curling Championships. Fry and Duguid, another former Brier champion won two more provincial senior championships together in 1994 and 1995. They won both of those tournaments with a new front end which included two other former Brier champions Terry Braunstein and Ray Turnbull. After turning 60, Fry graduated to the Masters level, and won a provincial and Canadian Masters Curling Championships in 2001 with Duguid, Warren and Coleman at lead.

== Personal life ==
Fry worked as a sales representative. He was married to Judy. Later in life, they moved to Toronto to be closer to his son, Ryan. He died of cancer in 2021.
