= Paul Devlin (curler) =

Canadian curler (1946–2021)

Paul Ernest Devlin (September 16, 1946 – March 7, 2021) was a Canadian curler. He has skipped two teams at the Brier, Canada's national men's championship, representing both Alberta and British Columbia.

== Curling career ==
Devlin, originally from Winnipeg, lost in the finals of the 1969 Manitoba provincial championships to Bobby Robinson. He later moved to Edmonton around 1977 and lost in the final of the 1978 Alberta men's championship to Ed Lukowich, who went on to win the Brier.

During the 1979 playdowns, Devlin, who was a car salesman, was given the choice by his employer to either pick curling or his career, and he chose curling. That year, he and teammates John Hunter, Pat Ryan and brother Derek defeated Lukowich in a re-match of the 1978 final, earning them the right to represent the province at the 1979 Macdonald Brier. At the Brier, Devlin led Alberta to a 6–5 record, tied for fourth.

Devlin returned to the Alberta final in 1980, but was upended by two-time World Junior champion Paul Gowsell.

Devlin moved to Vancouver in 1983, but was controversially allowed to curl in the 1984 Alberta playdowns, despite no longer living in the province.

Devlin formed a Vancouver-based team the next season, consisting of Doug Meger, Ken Watson and Dale Reibin. Despite the team struggling in the Vancouver Super League, they found success in the B.C. playdowns, and beat club mate Craig Lepine in the final of the 1985 BC Men's Curling Championship. This qualified the team to represent British Columbia at the 1985 Labatt Brier. Devlin became only the second curler to skip two different provinces at the Brier. At the 1985 Brier, he led B.C. to a 5–6 record, tied for seventh.

In around 1986, Devlin moved to Trail, British Columbia, and did not make it to a provincial men's final again.

Later in life, Devlin won a gold medal at the 2016 Canada 55+ Games in the 65+ mixed curling event.

== Personal life ==
Devlin was married and had two daughters. Later in life, he lived in Fruitvale, British Columbia. A car salesman early in his life, by the time of the 1985 Brier, he was an office computer systems salesman for Remgon.
