= Rod Hunter =

Canadian curler and politician

- Curler
- Born: August 24, 1943; Winnipeg, Manitoba, Canada
- Died: January 6, 2018 (aged 74); Viking, Alberta

Curling career
- Brier: 4 (1970, 1971, 1973, 1975)
- World Championship: 2 (1970, 1971)
Medal record
Men's curling
Representing Canada
World Championships
| Gold medal – first place | 1970 Utica |
| Gold medal – first place | 1971 Megève |
Representing Manitoba
Macdonald Brier
| Gold medal – first place | 1970 Winnipeg |
| Gold medal – first place | 1971 Quebec City |

Roderick George McLean "The Arrow" Hunter (August 24, 1943 – January 6, 2018) was a Canadian curler and politician. He was the third on the Don Duguid rink that won two World Curling Championships and two Brier Championships. He also won four British Consols Trophies, the men's provincial championship. After his curling career, Hunter moved to Alberta and became town councillor in the town of Viking. In Viking, he was also the president and manager of the Viking Curling Club.

Hunter was inducted into the Canadian Curling Hall of Fame in 1974 and was also a member of the Manitoba Curling Hall of Fame and Manitoba Sports Hall of Fame. He died in 2018 in Viking, Alberta.
