= Bill Tetley =

Canadian curler (1933–2003)

- Curler
- Born: July 11, 1933; Lion's Head, Ontario
- Died: June 9, 2003 (aged 69); Thunder Bay, Ontario

Team
- Curling club: Port Arthur CC, Port Arthur, Fort William CC, Thunder Bay

Curling career
- Member Association: Northern Ontario
- Brier: 3 (1957, 1971, 1975)
- World Championship: 1 (1975)
Medal record
Representing Canada
World Curling Championship
Bronze medal – third place	1975 Perth
Representing Northern Ontario
Macdonald Brier
Gold medal – first place	1975 Fredericton
Silver medal – second place	1971 Quebec City

William Ross Tetley (July 11, 1933 – June 9, 2003) was a Canadian curler. He was the skip of the 1975 Brier Champion team, representing Northern Ontario. The team later went on to finish third at the World Championships of that year. He is the father of curler Ian Tetley.

He also skipped Northern Ontario to a 6–5 record at the 1995 Canadian Senior Curling Championships, missing the playoffs.
