= Bryan Wood (curler) =

Canadian curler (born 1944)

- Curler
- Born: March 10, 1944 (age 82); Justice, Manitoba
Medal record
Men's curling
Representing Canada
World Championships
| Gold medal – first place | 1970 Utica |
| Gold medal – first place | 1971 Megève |
| Bronze medal – third place | 1979 Bern |
Representing Manitoba
Macdonald Brier
| Gold medal – first place | 1970 Winnipeg |
| Gold medal – first place | 1971 Quebec City |
| Gold medal – first place | 1979 Ottawa |

Bryan D. Wood (born March 10, 1944) is a Canadian former curler. He was the lead on the Don Duguid rink that won two Curling Championships and two Brier Championships. He also won the 1979 Macdonald Brier playing for Barry Fry.

Wood was inducted into the Manitoba Sports Hall of Fame in 2007.
