= 1954 Macdonald Brier =

Canadian men's curling championship

- Host city: Edmonton, Alberta
- Arena: Edmonton Gardens
- Dates: March 1–5
- Attendance: 32,000
- Winner: Alberta
- Curling club: Granite CC, Edmonton
- Skip: Matt Baldwin
- Third: Glenn Gray
- Second: Pete Ferry
- Lead: Jim Collins

The 1954 Macdonald Brier, the Canadian men's national curling championship, was held from March 1 to 5, 1954 at Edmonton Gardens in Edmonton, Alberta. A total of 32,000 fans attended the event.

Team Alberta, skipped by Matt Baldwin, became the third team to win Brier Tankard in their hometown, as they finished round robin play with a 9-1 record. This was Alberta's fifth Brier championship and the first of three by Baldwin as a skip. At age 27, Baldwin was the youngest skip to win a Brier at the time.

Baldwin is also remembered for pleasing the cheering hometown Edmonton crowd: during their final game against New Brunswick, he slid halfway down the sheet of ice when throwing his final rock of the event, which was legal under curling rules at the time, but had never been attempted. The rock stopped right on the button, cementing Baldwin's status as a "rock star".

== Teams ==
The teams are listed as follows:

Alberta	British Columbia	Manitoba	New Brunswick
Granite CC, Edmonton Skip: Matt Baldwin; Third: Glenn Gray; Second: Pete Ferry; Lead: Jim Collins	Vancouver CC, Vancouver Skip: Bung Cartmell; Third: Leslie Kitson; Second: James Dickson; Lead: Reginald Fry	Deer Lodge CC, Winnipeg Skip: Jimmy Welsh; Third: Alex Welsh; Second: Jock Reid; Lead: Harry Monk	Beaver CC, Moncton Skip: Richard McCully; Third: Wilfred Taylor; Second: Cecil McManus; Lead: Ralph Harley
Newfoundland	Northern Ontario	Nova Scotia	Ontario
St. John's CC, St. John's Skip: Robert Kent; Third: John Norris; Second: Gordon Stirling; Lead: Gerald Hanley	Granite CC, Sudbury Skip: Don Groom; Third: Raymond Cook; Second: Robert McInnes; Lead: Thomas Callaghan	Mayflower CC, Halifax Skip: Reginald Piercey; Third: Wesley Burge; Second: Charles Piper Jr. Lead: William Peters	Hamilton Thistle Club, Hamilton Skip: Ross Tarleton; Third: Rogert Cross; Second: Gordon Wilson; Lead: Ernest Lock
Prince Edward Island	Quebec	Saskatchewan
Charlottetown CC, Charlottetown Skip: Wendell MacDonald; Third: John Squarebriggs; Second: Elmer MacDonald; Lead: Barry MacDonald	Arvida CC, Chicoutimi Skip: William Tracy; Third: William White; Second: Ford Loucks; Lead: William Wallace	Avonlea CC, Avonlea Skip: Garnet Campbell; Third: Don Campbell; Second: Glen Campbell; Lead: Gordon Campbell

== Round robin standings ==
Key
Brier champion

Province	Skip	W	L	PF	PA
Alberta	Matt Baldwin	9	1	125	67
Saskatchewan	Garnet Campbell	8	2	114	85
Nova Scotia	Reginald Piercey	6	4	108	112
Northern Ontario	Donald Groom	6	4	107	77
British Columbia	Bung Cartmell	6	4	99	98
Ontario	Ross Tarleton	6	4	109	89
New Brunswick	Richard McCully	4	6	94	103
Manitoba	Jimmy Welsh	4	6	90	98
Prince Edward Island	Wendell MacDonald	3	7	87	100
Quebec	William Tracy	3	7	95	111
Newfoundland	Robert Kent	0	10	57	145

== Round robin results ==
All draw times are listed in Mountain Time (UTC-07:00)

=== Draw 1 ===
Monday, March 1 3:00 PM

Sheet A	1	2	3	4	5	6	7	8	9	10	11	12	Final
Alberta (Baldwin)	0	1	0	4	0	4	0	1	0	0	2	0	12
Saskatchewan (Campbell)	3	0	1	0	1	0	2	0	0	2	0	1	10

Sheet B	1	2	3	4	5	6	7	8	9	10	11	12	Final
Ontario (Tarleton)	0	5	1	0	1	2	1	0	2	2	0	2	16
Manitoba (Welsh)	1	0	0	3	0	0	0	1	0	0	2	0	7

Sheet C	1	2	3	4	5	6	7	8	9	10	11	12	Final
Northern Ontario (Groom)	2	0	1	4	0	3	1	0	1	2	0	3	17
British Columbia (Cartmell)	0	1	0	0	2	0	0	2	0	0	1	0	6

Sheet D	1	2	3	4	5	6	7	8	9	10	11	12	Final
Newfoundland (Kent)	0	1	0	0	0	0	1	0	1	0	0	2	5
Prince Edward Island (MacDonald)	1	0	1	1	1	4	0	2	0	1	2	0	13

Sheet E	1	2	3	4	5	6	7	8	9	10	11	12	Final
Nova Scotia (Piercey)	0	2	1	0	0	1	0	3	1	0	0	3	11
Quebec (Tracy)	4	0	0	2	3	0	2	0	0	1	1	0	13

=== Draw 2 ===
Monday, March 1 8:00 PM

Sheet A	1	2	3	4	5	6	7	8	9	10	11	12	Final
Nova Scotia (Piercey)	0	0	0	0	0	1	1	0	0	0	2	0	4
Alberta (Baldwin)	3	2	3	1	3	0	0	6	1	3	0	2	24

Sheet B	1	2	3	4	5	6	7	8	9	10	11	12	Final
Manitoba (Welsh)	0	3	0	2	0	3	0	1	0	0	0	2	11
Quebec (Tracy)	1	0	1	0	0	0	1	0	1	2	1	0	7

Sheet C	1	2	3	4	5	6	7	8	9	10	11	12	Final
New Brunswick (McCully)	1	0	2	0	0	1	0	0	0	3	0	0	7
Saskatchewan (Campbell)	0	1	0	2	1	0	3	2	3	0	1	1	14

Sheet D	1	2	3	4	5	6	7	8	9	10	11	12	Final
Northern Ontario (Groom)	1	2	0	2	1	2	1	1	0	2	2	0	14
Newfoundland (Kent)	0	0	1	0	0	0	0	0	1	0	0	1	3

Sheet E	1	2	3	4	5	6	7	8	9	10	11	12	Final
Ontario (Tarleton)	0	1	0	2	0	2	1	0	1	0	1	1	9
Prince Edward Island (MacDonald)	0	0	1	0	1	0	0	2	0	4	0	0	8

=== Draw 3 ===
Tuesday, March 2 9:00 AM

Sheet A	1	2	3	4	5	6	7	8	9	10	11	12	Final
Alberta (Baldwin)	0	2	0	2	0	2	2	0	3	1	0	0	12
Manitoba (Welsh)	1	0	1	0	1	0	0	2	0	0	0	2	7

Sheet B	1	2	3	4	5	6	7	8	9	10	11	12	Final
Ontario (Tarleton)	1	0	1	0	1	0	0	0	1	1	0	3	8
Northern Ontario (Groom)	0	2	0	2	0	0	1	2	0	0	3	0	10

Sheet C	1	2	3	4	5	6	7	8	9	10	11	12	Final
British Columbia (Cartmell)	1	1	0	1	2	0	3	0	2	0	0	0	10
Newfoundland (Kent)	0	0	1	0	0	1	0	2	0	1	1	1	7

Sheet D	1	2	3	4	5	6	7	8	9	10	11	12	Final
Nova Scotia (Piercey)	1	0	2	0	1	0	3	0	3	0	1	0	11
New Brunswick (McCully)	0	3	0	2	0	2	0	3	0	3	0	1	14

Sheet E	1	2	3	4	5	6	7	8	9	10	11	12	Final
Quebec (Tracy)	0	1	0	0	0	2	0	2	2	0	1	0	8
Prince Edward Island (MacDonald)	1	0	2	2	2	0	1	0	0	2	0	1	11

=== Draw 4 ===
Tuesday, March 2 2:30 PM

Sheet A	1	2	3	4	5	6	7	8	9	10	11	12	Final
Alberta (Baldwin)	0	1	0	0	1	0	1	1	2	0	1	2	9
Prince Edward Island (MacDonald)	1	0	0	1	0	1	0	0	0	2	0	0	5

Sheet B	1	2	3	4	5	6	7	8	9	10	11	12	Final
Ontario (Tarleton)	0	2	0	0	3	2	0	3	0	0	0	0	10
British Columbia (Cartmell)	1	0	1	1	0	0	2	0	2	1	1	2	11

Sheet C	1	2	3	4	5	6	7	8	9	10	11	12	13	Final
New Brunswick (McCully)	1	1	1	0	0	0	1	0	1	2	0	0	1	8
Manitoba (Welsh)	0	0	0	2	1	1	0	1	0	0	0	2	0	7

Sheet D	1	2	3	4	5	6	7	8	9	10	11	12	Final
Nova Scotia (Piercey)	1	0	4	0	1	0	1	0	2	0	0	2	11
Saskatchewan (Campbell)	0	1	0	2	0	2	0	2	0	2	1	0	10

Sheet E	1	2	3	4	5	6	7	8	9	10	11	12	Final
Northern Ontario (Groom)	0	6	0	1	0	0	2	0	4	0	1	0	14
Quebec (Tracy)	1	0	0	0	1	2	0	1	0	1	0	1	7

=== Draw 5 ===
Wednesday, March 3 3:00 PM

Sheet A	1	2	3	4	5	6	7	8	9	10	11	12	Final
Saskatchewan (Campbell)	2	1	0	0	0	0	2	0	0	2	0	0	7
Manitoba (Welsh)	0	0	0	0	0	2	0	1	0	0	2	1	6

Sheet B	1	2	3	4	5	6	7	8	9	10	11	12	Final
Alberta (Baldwin)	0	1	0	2	1	0	0	1	0	0	0	1	6
Northern Ontario (Groom)	2	0	1	0	0	0	1	0	0	0	1	0	5

Sheet C	1	2	3	4	5	6	7	8	9	10	11	12	Final
Quebec (Tracy)	1	1	0	1	0	2	0	2	0	2	0	0	9
British Columbia (Cartmell)	0	0	1	0	3	0	2	0	3	0	1	1	11

Sheet D	1	2	3	4	5	6	7	8	9	10	11	12	Final
Newfoundland (Kent)	0	1	0	1	0	0	1	0	0	2	0	1	6
Ontario (Tarleton)	1	0	3	0	3	2	0	3	1	0	2	0	15

Sheet E	1	2	3	4	5	6	7	8	9	10	11	12	Final
Prince Edward Island (MacDonald)	0	0	1	0	2	0	3	4	0	0	2	0	12
New Brunswick (McCully)	1	1	0	4	0	1	0	0	1	1	0	2	11

=== Draw 6 ===
Wednesday, March 3 8:00 PM

Sheet A	1	2	3	4	5	6	7	8	9	10	11	12	Final
Alberta (Baldwin)	3	0	0	1	0	1	0	3	1	0	2	0	11
British Columbia (Cartmell)	0	1	0	0	1	0	2	0	0	2	0	2	8

Sheet B	1	2	3	4	5	6	7	8	9	10	11	12	Final
Nova Scotia (Piercey)	1	0	0	2	4	1	0	0	1	1	0	2	12
Manitoba (Welsh)	0	1	3	0	0	0	2	1	0	0	3	0	10

Sheet C	1	2	3	4	5	6	7	8	9	10	11	12	Final
Northern Ontario (Groom)	4	0	1	1	1	0	2	0	3	1	0	0	13
New Brunswick (McCully)	0	3	0	0	0	1	0	1	0	0	2	2	9

Sheet D	1	2	3	4	5	6	7	8	9	10	11	12	Final
Prince Edward Island (MacDonald)	0	0	0	0	1	2	0	0	1	1	0	3	8
Saskatchewan (Campbell)	1	1	1	2	0	0	1	1	0	0	2	0	9

Sheet E	1	2	3	4	5	6	7	8	9	10	11	12	Final
Newfoundland (Kent)	0	1	0	0	0	1	1	0	2	0	0	0	5
Quebec (Tracy)	1	0	3	1	1	0	0	1	0	3	1	1	12

=== Draw 7 ===
Thursday, March 4 9:30 AM

Sheet A	1	2	3	4	5	6	7	8	9	10	11	12	Final
New Brunswick (McCully)	0	0	0	2	0	0	1	1	0	0	0	1	5
British Columbia (Cartmell)	1	1	1	0	2	1	0	0	1	1	2	0	10

Sheet B	1	2	3	4	5	6	7	8	9	10	11	12	Final
Alberta (Baldwin)	2	2	0	4	0	2	0	1	0	5	0	4	20
Newfoundland (Kent)	0	0	1	0	2	0	1	0	1	0	1	0	6

Sheet C	1	2	3	4	5	6	7	8	9	10	11	12	Final
Northern Ontario (Groom)	2	0	2	0	1	0	1	0	0	1	0	1	8
Saskatchewan (Campbell)	0	1	0	3	0	1	0	2	0	0	3	0	10

Sheet D	1	2	3	4	5	6	7	8	9	10	11	12	Final
Nova Scotia (Piercey)	2	0	0	3	0	1	3	3	1	2	0	1	16
Prince Edward Island (MacDonald)	0	1	0	0	1	0	0	0	0	0	2	0	4

Sheet E	1	2	3	4	5	6	7	8	9	10	11	12	Final
Ontario (Tarleton)	0	1	0	1	0	2	2	0	5	1	1	0	13
Quebec (Tracy)	1	0	1	0	4	0	0	3	0	0	0	1	10

=== Draw 8 ===
Thursday, March 4 3:00 PM

Sheet A	1	2	3	4	5	6	7	8	9	10	11	12	Final
Ontario (Tarleton)	0	2	1	0	0	1	0	1	1	0	2	0	8
Alberta (Baldwin)	0	0	0	0	0	0	3	0	0	1	0	1	5

Sheet B	1	2	3	4	5	6	7	8	9	10	11	12	Final
British Columbia (Cartmell)	2	0	1	0	3	0	0	1	0	0	0	0	7
Saskatchewan (Campbell)	0	1	0	1	0	0	1	0	4	1	1	1	10

Sheet C	1	2	3	4	5	6	7	8	9	10	11	12	Final
Northern Ontario (Groom)	2	0	0	0	3	0	0	0	2	0	0	0	7
Nova Scotia (Piercey)	0	1	2	0	0	2	1	0	0	3	1	2	12

Sheet D	1	2	3	4	5	6	7	8	9	10	11	12	Final
Manitoba (Welsh)	0	0	0	3	0	1	2	1	1	1	0	1	10
Prince Edward Island (MacDonald)	1	1	3	0	3	0	0	0	0	0	1	0	9

Sheet E	1	2	3	4	5	6	7	8	9	10	11	12	Final
New Brunswick (McCully)	5	3	0	1	1	0	0	0	4	0	0	2	16
Newfoundland (Kent)	0	0	1	0	0	1	1	1	0	1	1	0	6

=== Draw 9 ===
Thursday, March 4 8:00 PM

Sheet A	1	2	3	4	5	6	7	8	9	10	11	12	Final
Northern Ontario (Groom)	0	1	0	1	0	2	0	0	1	0	1	1	7
Manitoba (Welsh)	1	0	2	0	4	0	0	1	0	1	0	0	9

Sheet B	1	2	3	4	5	6	7	8	9	10	11	12	Final
Newfoundland (Kent)	0	2	1	0	1	0	0	2	3	0	0	0	9
Saskatchewan (Campbell)	1	0	0	3	0	5	4	0	0	2	2	2	19

Sheet C	1	2	3	4	5	6	7	8	9	10	11	12	Final
Ontario (Tarleton)	0	0	1	0	0	4	0	0	0	3	1	0	9
New Brunswick (McCully)	1	1	0	0	3	0	1	2	2	0	0	2	12

Sheet D	1	2	3	4	5	6	7	8	9	10	11	12	Final
Quebec (Tracy)	0	0	1	0	0	4	0	0	0	3	1	0	9
Alberta (Baldwin)	2	2	0	1	3	0	1	1	6	0	0	0	16

Sheet E	1	2	3	4	5	6	7	8	9	10	11	12	Final
British Columbia (Cartmell)	0	5	0	0	0	0	2	0	1	0	3	0	11
Nova Scotia (Piercey)	2	0	1	1	1	1	0	2	0	2	0	3	13

=== Draw 10 ===
Friday, March 5 9:30 AM

Sheet A	1	2	3	4	5	6	7	8	9	10	11	12	Final
British Columbia (Cartmell)	2	1	0	2	0	2	0	5	2	0	0	0	14
Manitoba (Welsh)	0	0	1	0	1	0	2	0	0	1	1	2	8

Sheet B	1	2	3	4	5	6	7	8	9	10	11	12	Final
Saskatchewan (Campbell)	2	2	1	0	0	3	0	3	0	1	0	1	13
Ontario (Tarleton)	0	0	0	2	2	0	1	0	1	0	2	0	8

Sheet C	1	2	3	4	5	6	7	8	9	10	11	12	Final
Quebec (Tracy)	0	2	0	0	3	0	2	0	1	0	3	0	11
New Brunswick (McCully)	2	0	1	1	0	1	0	1	0	0	0	1	7

Sheet D	1	2	3	4	5	6	7	8	9	10	11	12	Final
Prince Edward Island (MacDonald)	0	2	0	1	0	1	0	0	2	0	1	2	9
Northern Ontario (Groom)	1	0	2	0	3	0	3	2	0	1	0	0	12

Sheet E	1	2	3	4	5	6	7	8	9	10	11	12	Final
Newfoundland (Kent)	0	0	1	0	1	3	0	0	0	1	0	0	6
Nova Scotia (Piercey)	2	1	0	1	0	0	2	1	1	0	3	0	11

=== Draw 11 ===
Friday, March 5 2:30 PM

Sheet A	1	2	3	4	5	6	7	8	9	10	11	12	Final
Prince Edward Island (MacDonald)	1	1	0	1	0	3	0	1	0	1	0	0	8
British Columbia (Cartmell)	0	0	2	0	1	0	2	0	3	0	2	1	11

Sheet B	1	2	3	4	5	6	7	8	9	10	11	12	Final
Nova Scotia (Piercey)	2	1	0	0	0	0	3	0	0	0	0	1	7
Ontario (Tarleton)	0	0	1	2	4	2	0	1	1	1	1	0	13

Sheet C	1	2	3	4	5	6	7	8	9	10	11	12	Final
Saskatchewan (Campbell)	2	0	0	0	2	0	2	0	3	0	3	0	12
Quebec (Tracy)	0	0	1	0	0	3	0	2	0	2	0	1	9

Sheet D	1	2	3	4	5	6	7	8	9	10	11	12	Final
Alberta (Baldwin)	1	0	0	1	0	1	2	1	0	3	0	1	10
New Brunswick (McCully)	0	0	1	0	1	0	0	0	1	0	2	0	5

Sheet E	1	2	3	4	5	6	7	8	9	10	11	12	Final
Newfoundland (Kent)	0	0	0	0	1	0	0	2	0	1	0	0	4
Manitoba (Welsh)	3	1	2	0	0	0	3	0	3	0	0	3	15
