= 1937 Macdonald Brier =

Canadian men's curling championship

- Host city: Toronto, Ontario
- Arena: Granite Curling Club
- Dates: March 1–5
- Winner: Alberta
- Curling club: Royal CC, Edmonton
- Skip: Cliff Manahan
- Third: Wesley Robinson
- Second: Ross Manahan
- Lead: Lloyd McIntyre
- Finalist: Manitoba (Jimmy Welsh)

The 1937 Macdonald Brier, the Canadian men's national curling championship, was held from March 1 to 5, 1937 at the Granite Club in Toronto, Ontario.

Both Alberta and Manitoba finished round robin play 8–1, necessitating a tiebreaker playoff for the Brier championship. Team Alberta, skipped by Cliff Manahan, would win the tiebreaker in dominant fashion over Manitoba 19–7 to capture the Brier Tankard. This was Alberta's and Manahan's second Brier championship, as Manahan had skipped Alberta to their only other title in 1933.

== Teams ==
The teams are listed as follows:

Alberta	British Columbia	Manitoba	New Brunswick	Northern Ontario
Royal CC, Edmonton Skip: Cliff Manahan; Third: Wesley Robinson; Second: Ross Manahan; Lead: Lloyd McIntyre	Vancouver CC, Vancouver Skip: Roland David; Third: Francis Avery; Second: Frederick Tinling; Lead: George Norgan	Deer Lodge CC, Winnipeg Skip: Jimmy Welsh; Third: Fred Smith; Second: Jock Reid; Lead: Harry Monk Sr.	Fredericton CC, Fredericton Skip: Charles Barry; Third: Fred Hatt; Second: Harold Colwell; Lead: Harold Porter	Haileybury CC, Haileybury Skip: Emmett Smith; Third: Daniel Millar; Second: William Beecroft; Lead: Melvin Robb
Nova Scotia	Ontario	Prince Edward Island	Quebec	Saskatchewan
Truro CC, Truro Skip: Hugh Ferguson; Third: Victor Crowe; Second: Charles Cox; Lead: George Thomas	Kitchener Granite CC, Kitchener Skip: Albert Dunker; Third: Irvin Huntington; Second: Arthur Lehnen; Lead: Frederick Hasenflug	Charlottetown CC, Charlottetown Skip: Arthur Belcher; Third: Philip Cobb; Second: Edmund Miles; Lead: William Lord	Calendonia CC, Montreal Skip: Ormiston Roy; Third: John Roy; Second: Howard Stewart; Lead: Edwin Maw	Moose Jaw CC, Moose Jaw Skip: Franklin Smith; Third: William Turner; Second: Earl West; Lead: Archibald Graham

== Round Robin standings ==
Key
Teams to Tiebreaker

Province	Skip	W	L	PF	PA
Alberta	Cliff Manahan	8	1	113	74
Manitoba	James Welsh	8	1	117	65
Northern Ontario	Emmett Smith	7	2	94	74
Saskatchewan	Franklin Smith	6	3	115	80
Nova Scotia	Hugh Ferguson	5	4	82	103
British Columbia	Roland David	5	4	111	77
Quebec	Ormiston Roy	2	7	68	121
Ontario	Albert Dunker	2	7	90	83
New Brunswick	Charles Barry	1	8	77	119
Prince Edward Island	Arthur Belcher	1	8	65	136

== Round Robin results ==
=== Draw 1 ===
Sheet A	1	2	3	4	5	6	7	8	9	10	11	12	Final
Alberta (Manahan)	0	1	0	2	1	0	1	2	1	0	2	0	10
Northern Ontario (E. Smith)	2	0	2	0	0	1	0	0	0	1	0	1	7

Sheet B	1	2	3	4	5	6	7	8	9	10	11	12	Final
Prince Edward Island (Belcher)	1	0	1	0	0	0	2	0	1	1	1	0	7
Saskatchewan (F. Smith)	0	4	0	6	3	5	0	2	0	0	0	2	22

Sheet C	1	2	3	4	5	6	7	8	9	10	11	12	Final
New Brunswick (Barry)	0	0	1	0	1	0	0	0	1	1	0	1	5
Ontario (Dunker)	4	1	0	2	0	2	2	1	0	0	2	0	14

Sheet D	1	2	3	4	5	6	7	8	9	10	11	12	Final
Nova Scotia (Ferguson)	2	0	0	0	3	1	0	1	1	0	0	1	9
British Columbia (David)	0	1	1	2	0	0	1	0	0	2	1	0	8

Sheet E	1	2	3	4	5	6	7	8	9	10	11	12	Final
Quebec (Roy)	0	0	3	0	0	0	0	0	1	1	0	1	6
Manitoba (Welsh)	1	3	0	2	1	4	3	1	0	0	1	0	16

=== Draw 2 ===
Sheet A	1	2	3	4	5	6	7	8	9	10	11	12	Final
Saskatchewan (F. Smith)	2	1	0	1	0	0	0	0	0	1	1	0	6
Alberta (Manahan)	0	0	1	0	1	1	1	1	2	0	0	1	8

Sheet B	1	2	3	4	5	6	7	8	9	10	11	12	Final
Manitoba (Welsh)	0	0	3	0	0	3	1	0	1	0	3	5	16
New Brunswick (Barry)	1	1	0	1	1	0	0	1	0	1	0	0	6

Sheet C	1	2	3	4	5	6	7	8	9	10	11	12	Final
Prince Edward Island (Belcher)	0	0	0	1	0	0	1	0	0	2	0	2	6
British Columbia (David)	2	3	2	0	2	3	0	1	1	0	3	0	17

Sheet D	1	2	3	4	5	6	7	8	9	10	11	12	Final
Northern Ontario (E. Smith)	1	2	0	4	3	3	1	1	0	0	0	0	15
Quebec (Roy)	0	0	1	0	0	0	0	0	5	3	2	1	12

Sheet E	1	2	3	4	5	6	7	8	9	10	11	12	13	Final
Ontario (Dunker)	1	2	1	0	1	1	0	1	0	1	0	0	0	8
Nova Scotia (Ferguson)	0	0	0	2	0	0	2	0	2	0	1	1	1	9

=== Draw 3 ===
Sheet A	1	2	3	4	5	6	7	8	9	10	11	12	Final
British Columbia (David)	0	1	1	6	1	2	0	0	1	0	1	X	13
Alberta (Manahan)	1	0	0	0	0	0	2	2	0	1	0	X	6

Sheet B	1	2	3	4	5	6	7	8	9	10	11	12	Final
New Brunswick (Barry)	0	1	0	1	1	0	1	0	1	0	1	1	7
Northern Ontario (E. Smith)	3	0	3	0	0	4	0	2	0	3	0	0	15

Sheet C	1	2	3	4	5	6	7	8	9	10	11	12	Final
Manitoba (Welsh)	3	4	1	3	0	0	4	0	0	2	3	0	20
Nova Scotia (Ferguson)	0	0	0	0	2	1	0	2	2	0	0	2	9

Sheet D	1	2	3	4	5	6	7	8	9	10	11	12	Final
Prince Edward Island (Belcher)	1	0	1	0	3	0	1	0	1	0	0	0	7
Ontario (Dunker)	0	4	0	4	0	1	0	1	0	3	2	3	18

Sheet E	1	2	3	4	5	6	7	8	9	10	11	12	Final
Quebec (Roy)	0	1	0	1	0	0	0	2	0	0	0	2	6
Saskatchewan (F. Smith)	1	0	2	0	1	5	1	0	1	2	2	0	15

=== Draw 4 ===
Sheet A	1	2	3	4	5	6	7	8	9	10	11	12	Final
Northern Ontario (E. Smith)	0	1	2	2	0	3	0	2	2	0	3	0	15
Prince Edward Island (Belcher)	1	0	0	0	1	0	2	0	0	1	0	5	10

Sheet B	1	2	3	4	5	6	7	8	9	10	11	12	Final
British Columbia (David)	3	0	3	1	0	0	6	3	1	1	1	0	19
New Brunswick (Barry)	0	1	0	0	1	2	0	0	0	0	0	3	7

Sheet C	1	2	3	4	5	6	7	8	9	10	11	12	Final
Manitoba (Welsh)	1	0	3	0	1	0	3	1	0	0	1	0	10
Alberta (Manahan)	0	2	0	3	0	3	0	0	2	1	0	3	14

Sheet D	1	2	3	4	5	6	7	8	9	10	11	12	Final
Ontario (Dunker)	0	0	1	0	0	1	3	0	1	0	2	0	8
Quebec (Roy)	1	1	0	1	2	0	0	2	0	1	0	1	9

Sheet E	1	2	3	4	5	6	7	8	9	10	11	12	Final
Saskatchewan (F. Smith)	4	3	4	0	0	0	0	5	0	0	3	0	19
Nova Scotia (Ferguson)	0	0	0	1	1	2	1	0	1	3	0	1	10

=== Draw 5 ===
Sheet A	1	2	3	4	5	6	7	8	9	10	11	12	Final
Alberta (Manahan)	0	1	1	3	0	3	0	0	3	1	0	0	12
New Brunswick (Barry)	1	0	0	0	1	0	4	2	0	0	1	0	9

Sheet B	1	2	3	4	5	6	7	8	9	10	11	12	Final
British Columbia (David)	2	0	1	0	2	0	0	1	0	0	0	X	6
Manitoba (Welsh)	0	1	0	3	0	1	1	0	4	2	1	X	13

Sheet C	1	2	3	4	5	6	7	8	9	10	11	12	Final
Saskatchewan (F. Smith)	0	2	1	0	0	2	1	0	1	2	0	1	10
Ontario (Dunker)	1	0	0	1	1	0	0	3	0	0	2	0	8

Sheet D	1	2	3	4	5	6	7	8	9	10	11	12	Final
Northern Ontario (E. Smith)	0	0	1	0	1	1	2	0	1	2	0	2	10
Nova Scotia (Ferguson)	1	1	0	1	0	0	0	2	0	0	0	0	5

Sheet E	1	2	3	4	5	6	7	8	9	10	11	12	Final
Quebec (Roy)	0	1	2	0	0	0	0	1	0	0	0	4	8
Prince Edward Island (Belcher)	1	0	0	1	1	1	1	0	1	1	3	0	10

=== Draw 6 ===
Sheet A	1	2	3	4	5	6	7	8	9	10	11	12	Final
Quebec (Roy)	0	0	0	1	1	0	1	0	1	0	0	0	4
Alberta (Manahan)	1	2	4	0	0	5	0	2	0	1	4	0	19

Sheet B	1	2	3	4	5	6	7	8	9	10	11	12	Final
British Columbia (David)	1	1	0	0	3	0	2	0	1	0	0	2	10
Ontario (Dunker)	0	0	1	1	0	1	0	2	0	2	2	0	9

Sheet C	1	2	3	4	5	6	7	8	9	10	11	12	Final
New Brunswick (Barry)	1	1	0	0	2	1	2	1	0	1	0	0	9
Nova Scotia (Ferguson)	0	0	2	2	0	0	0	0	2	0	3	1	10

Sheet D	1	2	3	4	5	6	7	8	9	10	11	12	Final
Saskatchewan (F. Smith)	1	0	3	0	0	1	0	0	1	0	0	0	6
Northern Ontario (E. Smith)	0	0	0	0	1	0	1	2	0	3	1	0	8

Sheet E	1	2	3	4	5	6	7	8	9	10	11	12	Final
Manitoba (Welsh)	2	2	1	0	4	0	1	0	3	0	2	0	15
Prince Edward Island (Belcher)	0	0	0	1	0	1	0	1	0	1	0	1	5

=== Draw 7 ===
Sheet A	1	2	3	4	5	6	7	8	9	10	11	12	Final
Ontario (Dunker)	0	0	0	0	3	1	0	3	2	0	1	0	10
Alberta (Manahan)	3	1	2	4	0	0	1	0	0	1	0	1	13

Sheet B	1	2	3	4	5	6	7	8	9	10	11	12	Final
Manitoba (Welsh)	0	0	1	0	2	0	1	0	2	0	1	0	7
Northern Ontario (E. Smith)	0	0	0	1	0	1	0	1	0	1	0	1	5

Sheet C	1	2	3	4	5	6	7	8	9	10	11	12	Final
Saskatchewan (F. Smith)	3	2	2	1	0	0	4	0	2	0	0	0	14
British Columbia (David)	0	0	0	0	1	3	0	2	0	1	1	3	11

Sheet D	1	2	3	4	5	6	7	8	9	10	11	12	13	Final
Nova Scotia (Ferguson)	2	0	2	0	1	0	1	0	0	0	2	1	1	10
Prince Edward Island (Belcher)	0	1	0	1	0	2	0	1	2	2	0	0	0	9

Sheet E	1	2	3	4	5	6	7	8	9	10	11	12	Final
New Brunswick (Barry)	1	0	1	2	0	1	0	1	1	0	2	0	9
Quebec (Roy)	0	1	0	0	3	0	4	0	0	3	0	1	12

=== Draw 8 ===
Sheet A	1	2	3	4	5	6	7	8	9	10	11	12	Final
British Columbia (David)	1	0	1	0	3	0	1	0	1	1	0	0	8
Northern Ontario (E. Smith)	0	1	0	1	0	1	0	1	0	0	4	1	9

Sheet B	1	2	3	4	5	6	7	8	9	10	11	12	Final
New Brunswick (Barry)	0	1	1	0	1	0	1	0	0	3	3	2	12
Saskatchewan (F. Smith)	2	0	0	4	0	3	0	2	4	0	0	0	15

Sheet C	1	2	3	4	5	6	7	8	9	10	11	12	Final
Alberta (Manahan)	1	2	0	2	2	0	6	0	2	1	1	1	18
Prince Edward Island (Belcher)	0	0	1	0	0	2	0	2	0	0	0	0	5

Sheet D	1	2	3	4	5	6	7	8	9	10	11	12	Final
Nova Scotia (Ferguson)	0	0	1	0	4	1	1	1	0	0	0	2	10
Quebec (Roy)	1	1	0	2	0	0	0	0	1	1	1	0	7

Sheet E	1	2	3	4	5	6	7	8	9	10	11	12	Final
Manitoba (Welsh)	0	1	0	1	2	0	0	1	2	2	1	0	10
Ontario (Dunker)	1	0	1	0	0	1	2	0	0	0	0	1	6

=== Draw 9 ===
Sheet A	1	2	3	4	5	6	7	8	9	10	11	12	13	Final
Alberta (Manahan)	0	2	0	1	0	0	0	0	2	0	5	0	3	13
Nova Scotia (Ferguson)	2	0	1	0	1	1	1	1	0	1	0	2	0	10

Sheet B	1	2	3	4	5	6	7	8	9	10	11	12	Final
Manitoba (Welsh)	4	0	2	1	0	0	0	1	0	1	0	1	10
Saskatchewan (F. Smith)	0	2	0	0	2	1	1	0	1	0	1	0	8

Sheet C	1	2	3	4	5	6	7	8	9	10	11	12	13	Final
Northern Ontario (E. Smith)	0	1	1	0	0	2	0	3	1	1	0	0	1	10
Ontario (Dunker)	1	0	0	3	1	0	1	0	0	0	2	1	0	9

Sheet D	1	2	3	4	5	6	7	8	9	10	11	12	Final
British Columbia (David)	5	2	1	0	1	1	1	0	3	2	0	3	19
Quebec (Roy)	0	0	0	1	0	0	0	2	0	0	1	0	4

Sheet E	1	2	3	4	5	6	7	8	9	10	11	12	Final
New Brunswick (Barry)	1	0	0	5	2	0	2	0	1	0	2	0	13
Prince Edward Island (Belcher)	0	1	1	0	0	1	0	1	0	1	0	1	6

== Tiebreaker ==
Sheet A	1	2	3	4	5	6	7	8	9	10	11	12	Final
Alberta (Manahan)	3	2	0	3	0	5	0	4	0	1	1	0	19
Manitoba (Welsh)	0	0	1	0	1	0	2	0	2	0	0	1	7
