= 1948 Macdonald Brier =

Canadian men's curling championship

- Host city: Calgary, Alberta
- Arena: Victoria Arena
- Dates: March 1-4
- Attendance: 30,000
- Winner: British Columbia
- Curling club: Trail CC, Trail
- Skip: Frenchy D'Amour
- Third: Robert McGhie
- Second: Frederick Wendell
- Lead: James Mark

The 1948 Macdonald Brier, the Canadian men's national curling championship, was held from March 1 to 4, 1948 at Victoria Arena in Calgary, Alberta.

Team British Columbia, skipped by Frenchy D'Amour, captured British Columbia's first ever Brier Tankard after finishing round robin play 8-1. D'Amour's rink had finished second in the Brier the year before.

== Event summary ==
Both Manitoba and British Columbia got off to hot starts as each of them won their first five games heading into Draw 6, which featured a match between those teams. Manitoba appeared to be in the drivers seat for their twelfth Brier championship as they scored two in the final end to beat British Columbia 9-8. But in their next two draws, Manitoba lost to both Ontario and Northern Ontario. British Columbia took advantage as they won their next two games over Nova Scotia and New Brunswick, taking the lead with one draw remaining.

Even though British Columbia was leading with a 7-1 record heading into the final draw, both Manitoba and Northern Ontario still had a shot in forcing a playoff as both teams needed to win and if British Columbia lost. Northern Ontario faltered and lose to Nova Scotia 8-6 eliminating them from contention while Manitoba held off a New Brunswick rally with an 11-8 win.

Meanwhile, British Columbia and Quebec were locked in a battle as they were tied at 7 through eight ends. British Columbia appeared to pull away with two in the ninth and a steal of one in the tenth to take a 10-8 lead. After the eleventh end was blanked, Quebec stormed back to score three in the last end to force and extra end. British Columbia scored one in the extra end and won 11-10 to capture the province's first Brier Tankard. A then curling-record of 5,200 fans were on hand to watch the final round.

== Teams ==
The teams are listed as follows:

| Alberta | British Columbia | Manitoba | New Brunswick | Northern Ontario |
|---|---|---|---|---|
| Glencoe CC, Calgary Skip: William McLaws; Third: James Williams; Second: Olie Syverson; Lead: Frederick J. Graham | Trail CC, Trail Skip: Frenchy D'Amour; Third: Robert McGhie; Second: Frederick Wendell; Lead: James Mark | Granite CC, Winnipeg Skip: George Sangster; Third: Bill Sangster; Second: George Weldon; Lead: William Petrie | St. Andrews CC, Saint John Skip: Henry Hollies; Third: William Timmerman; Second: Philip Soulis; Lead: Walter Logan | Kenora CC, Kenora Skip: James Guy; Third: William Johnson; Second: George Holmstrom; Lead: Jack McLeod |
| Nova Scotia | Ontario | Prince Edward Island | Quebec | Saskatchewan |
| Sydney CC, Sydney Skip: Gerald Glinz; Third: Murray Vallas; Second: Parker Rudderham; Lead: Stewart MacVicar | Galt CC, Galt Skip: Jack Patrick; Third: William Meyer; Second: Walter MacGregor; Lead: Angus Oliver | Summerside CC, Summerside Skip: Gerald Hayes; Third: Theron Morrison; Second: Neil MacLeennan; Lead: Frederick G. McRae | C de C Jacques Cartier, Quebec City Skip: Gaston Amyot; Third: Guillaume Piette; Second: Pierre Amyot; Lead: Ernest Blais | Rosetown CC, Rosetown Skip: Clifford Annabel; Third: John Franklin; Second: William Heartwell; Lead: John Sansom |

== Round-robin standings ==
Key
| Brier champion |

| Province | Skip | W | L | PF | PA |
|---|---|---|---|---|---|
| British Columbia | Frenchy D'Amour | 8 | 1 | 106 | 53 |
| Manitoba | George Sangster | 7 | 2 | 110 | 80 |
| Northern Ontario | James Guy | 6 | 3 | 108 | 82 |
| Saskatchewan | Clifford Annabel | 5 | 4 | 89 | 90 |
| Ontario | Jack Patrick | 5 | 4 | 98 | 78 |
| Nova Scotia | Gerald Glinz | 4 | 5 | 71 | 91 |
| Alberta | William McLaws | 4 | 5 | 84 | 84 |
| New Brunswick | Henry Hollies | 3 | 6 | 87 | 93 |
| Quebec | Gaston Amyot | 3 | 6 | 76 | 102 |
| Prince Edward Island | Gerald Hayes | 0 | 9 | 60 | 136 |

== Round-robin results ==
=== Draw 1 ===
| Sheet A | 1 | 2 | 3 | 4 | 5 | 6 | 7 | 8 | 9 | 10 | 11 | 12 | 13 | Final |
| Alberta (McLaws) | 0 | 0 | 1 | 0 | 1 | 1 | 0 | 1 | 2 | 0 | 0 | 1 | 0 | 7 |
| Nova Scotia (Glintz) | 0 | 1 | 0 | 1 | 0 | 0 | 1 | 0 | 0 | 2 | 2 | 0 | 1 | 8 |

| Sheet B | 1 | 2 | 3 | 4 | 5 | 6 | 7 | 8 | 9 | 10 | 11 | 12 | Final |
| Prince Edward Island (Hayes) | 1 | 0 | 2 | 0 | 1 | 0 | 0 | 1 | 0 | 0 | 0 | 0 | 5 |
| British Columbia (D'Amour) | 0 | 2 | 0 | 6 | 0 | 2 | 1 | 0 | 2 | 1 | 1 | 1 | 16 |

| Sheet C | 1 | 2 | 3 | 4 | 5 | 6 | 7 | 8 | 9 | 10 | 11 | 12 | Final |
| Ontario (Patrick) | 0 | 0 | 2 | 0 | 1 | 0 | 0 | 4 | 0 | 0 | 1 | 0 | 8 |
| New Brunswick (Hollies) | 1 | 1 | 0 | 3 | 0 | 0 | 1 | 0 | 2 | 2 | 0 | 3 | 13 |

| Sheet D | 1 | 2 | 3 | 4 | 5 | 6 | 7 | 8 | 9 | 10 | 11 | 12 | Final |
| Saskatchewan (Annabel) | 0 | 2 | 0 | 0 | 1 | 0 | 1 | 0 | 0 | 0 | 0 | 0 | 4 |
| Manitoba (Sangster) | 2 | 0 | 2 | 1 | 0 | 3 | 0 | 3 | 3 | 1 | 1 | 1 | 17 |

| Sheet E | 1 | 2 | 3 | 4 | 5 | 6 | 7 | 8 | 9 | 10 | 11 | 12 | Final |
| Quebec (Amyot) | 0 | 1 | 0 | 1 | 0 | 1 | 1 | 2 | 0 | 0 | 0 | 1 | 7 |
| Northern Ontario (Guy) | 4 | 0 | 1 | 0 | 1 | 0 | 0 | 0 | 1 | 2 | 2 | 0 | 11 |

=== Draw 2 ===
| Sheet A | 1 | 2 | 3 | 4 | 5 | 6 | 7 | 8 | 9 | 10 | 11 | 12 | Final |
| Northern Ontario (Guy) | 0 | 4 | 1 | 1 | 0 | 1 | 2 | 0 | 4 | 0 | 1 | 0 | 14 |
| Saskatchewan (Annabel) | 1 | 0 | 0 | 0 | 1 | 0 | 0 | 1 | 0 | 3 | 0 | 2 | 8 |

| Sheet B | 1 | 2 | 3 | 4 | 5 | 6 | 7 | 8 | 9 | 10 | 11 | 12 | Final |
| Nova Scotia (Glintz) | 0 | 0 | 0 | 0 | 0 | 0 | 0 | 0 | 0 | 0 | 0 | 3 | 3 |
| Ontario (Patrick) | 2 | 2 | 2 | 0 | 1 | 1 | 1 | 1 | 1 | 2 | 1 | 0 | 14 |

| Sheet C | 1 | 2 | 3 | 4 | 5 | 6 | 7 | 8 | 9 | 10 | 11 | 12 | Final |
| New Brunswick (Hollies) | 3 | 0 | 1 | 2 | 2 | 3 | 1 | 1 | 1 | 0 | 1 | 0 | 15 |
| Quebec (Amyot) | 0 | 0 | 0 | 0 | 0 | 0 | 0 | 0 | 0 | 1 | 0 | 1 | 2 |

| Sheet D | 1 | 2 | 3 | 4 | 5 | 6 | 7 | 8 | 9 | 10 | 11 | 12 | Final |
| Alberta (McLaws) | 0 | 0 | 0 | 0 | 0 | 1 | 0 | 0 | 1 | 0 | 0 | 1 | 3 |
| British Columbia (D'Amour) | 0 | 3 | 1 | 3 | 2 | 0 | 1 | 1 | 0 | 1 | 1 | 0 | 13 |

| Sheet E | 1 | 2 | 3 | 4 | 5 | 6 | 7 | 8 | 9 | 10 | 11 | 12 | Final |
| Manitoba (Sangster) | 0 | 3 | 1 | 1 | 0 | 3 | 0 | 0 | 5 | 1 | 3 | 1 | 18 |
| Prince Edward Island (Hayes) | 2 | 0 | 0 | 0 | 1 | 0 | 1 | 1 | 0 | 0 | 0 | 0 | 5 |

=== Draw 3 ===
| Sheet A | 1 | 2 | 3 | 4 | 5 | 6 | 7 | 8 | 9 | 10 | 11 | 12 | Final |
| Manitoba (Sangster) | 1 | 1 | 3 | 0 | 0 | 0 | 1 | 1 | 0 | 3 | 0 | 2 | 12 |
| Alberta (McLaws) | 0 | 0 | 0 | 3 | 0 | 1 | 0 | 0 | 1 | 0 | 2 | 0 | 7 |

| Sheet B | 1 | 2 | 3 | 4 | 5 | 6 | 7 | 8 | 9 | 10 | 11 | 12 | Final |
| New Brunswick (Hollies) | 1 | 0 | 0 | 1 | 1 | 0 | 0 | 0 | 0 | 0 | 2 | 0 | 5 |
| Saskatchewan (Annabel) | 0 | 1 | 1 | 0 | 0 | 3 | 3 | 1 | 1 | 3 | 0 | 1 | 14 |

| Sheet C | 1 | 2 | 3 | 4 | 5 | 6 | 7 | 8 | 9 | 10 | 11 | 12 | Final |
| British Columbia (D'Amour) | 1 | 0 | 0 | 3 | 2 | 1 | 0 | 2 | 0 | 0 | 0 | 2 | 11 |
| Ontario (Patrick) | 0 | 1 | 0 | 0 | 0 | 0 | 1 | 0 | 0 | 1 | 1 | 0 | 4 |

| Sheet D | 1 | 2 | 3 | 4 | 5 | 6 | 7 | 8 | 9 | 10 | 11 | 12 | Final |
| Northern Ontario (Guy) | 2 | 1 | 3 | 0 | 2 | 0 | 2 | 0 | 4 | 0 | 3 | 3 | 20 |
| Prince Edward Island (Hayes) | 0 | 0 | 0 | 1 | 0 | 1 | 0 | 1 | 0 | 1 | 0 | 0 | 4 |

| Sheet E | 1 | 2 | 3 | 4 | 5 | 6 | 7 | 8 | 9 | 10 | 11 | 12 | Final |
| Nova Scotia (Glintz) | 0 | 0 | 0 | 0 | 1 | 1 | 0 | 0 | 3 | 0 | 1 | 0 | 6 |
| Quebec (Amyot) | 2 | 3 | 1 | 1 | 0 | 0 | 1 | 1 | 0 | 1 | 0 | 1 | 11 |

=== Draw 4 ===
| Sheet A | 1 | 2 | 3 | 4 | 5 | 6 | 7 | 8 | 9 | 10 | 11 | 12 | Final |
| New Brunswick (Hollies) | 0 | 0 | 0 | 2 | 2 | 0 | 2 | 0 | 1 | 0 | 1 | 1 | 9 |
| Alberta (McLaws) | 0 | 1 | 2 | 0 | 0 | 2 | 0 | 1 | 0 | 6 | 0 | 0 | 12 |

| Sheet B | 1 | 2 | 3 | 4 | 5 | 6 | 7 | 8 | 9 | 10 | 11 | 12 | 13 | Final |
| British Columbia (D'Amour) | 1 | 1 | 0 | 0 | 0 | 1 | 0 | 1 | 0 | 2 | 1 | 0 | 1 | 8 |
| Saskatchewan (Annabel) | 0 | 0 | 1 | 0 | 0 | 0 | 1 | 0 | 2 | 0 | 0 | 3 | 0 | 7 |

| Sheet C | 1 | 2 | 3 | 4 | 5 | 6 | 7 | 8 | 9 | 10 | 11 | 12 | Final |
| Ontario (Patrick) | 0 | 2 | 0 | 1 | 0 | 1 | 0 | 0 | 1 | 0 | 2 | 2 | 9 |
| Northern Ontario (Guy) | 3 | 0 | 2 | 0 | 2 | 0 | 1 | 1 | 0 | 4 | 0 | 0 | 13 |

| Sheet D | 1 | 2 | 3 | 4 | 5 | 6 | 7 | 8 | 9 | 10 | 11 | 12 | Final |
| Prince Edward Island (Hayes) | 0 | 3 | 0 | 1 | 0 | 1 | 0 | 1 | 0 | 0 | 0 | 3 | 9 |
| Nova Scotia (Glintz) | 1 | 0 | 2 | 0 | 3 | 0 | 3 | 0 | 2 | 1 | 1 | 0 | 13 |

| Sheet E | 1 | 2 | 3 | 4 | 5 | 6 | 7 | 8 | 9 | 10 | 11 | 12 | Final |
| Quebec (Amyot) | 1 | 0 | 1 | 1 | 0 | 1 | 0 | 2 | 0 | 2 | 0 | 1 | 9 |
| Manitoba (Sangster) | 0 | 2 | 0 | 0 | 3 | 0 | 2 | 0 | 1 | 0 | 5 | 0 | 13 |

=== Draw 5 ===
| Sheet A | 1 | 2 | 3 | 4 | 5 | 6 | 7 | 8 | 9 | 10 | 11 | 12 | Final |
| Nova Scotia (Glintz) | 0 | 0 | 0 | 0 | 1 | 0 | 0 | 1 | 0 | 2 | 0 | 4 | 8 |
| Manitoba (Sangster) | 3 | 1 | 1 | 4 | 0 | 1 | 1 | 0 | 1 | 0 | 1 | 0 | 13 |

| Sheet B | 1 | 2 | 3 | 4 | 5 | 6 | 7 | 8 | 9 | 10 | 11 | 12 | Final |
| New Brunswick (Hollies) | 0 | 0 | 1 | 2 | 0 | 1 | 2 | 0 | 1 | 2 | 1 | 2 | 12 |
| Prince Edward Island (Hayes) | 1 | 1 | 0 | 0 | 2 | 0 | 0 | 1 | 0 | 0 | 0 | 0 | 5 |

| Sheet C | 1 | 2 | 3 | 4 | 5 | 6 | 7 | 8 | 9 | 10 | 11 | 12 | Final |
| Quebec (Amyot) | 0 | 1 | 0 | 2 | 0 | 4 | 2 | 0 | 1 | 0 | 0 | 0 | 10 |
| Alberta (McLaws) | 1 | 0 | 1 | 0 | 2 | 0 | 0 | 1 | 0 | 1 | 2 | 1 | 9 |

| Sheet D | 1 | 2 | 3 | 4 | 5 | 6 | 7 | 8 | 9 | 10 | 11 | 12 | 13 | Final |
| Ontario (Patrick) | 0 | 2 | 0 | 1 | 0 | 0 | 2 | 0 | 2 | 2 | 0 | 0 | 0 | 9 |
| Saskatchewan (Annabel) | 1 | 0 | 1 | 0 | 3 | 1 | 0 | 2 | 0 | 0 | 0 | 1 | 1 | 10 |

| Sheet E | 1 | 2 | 3 | 4 | 5 | 6 | 7 | 8 | 9 | 10 | 11 | 12 | Final |
| British Columbia (D'Amour) | 1 | 1 | 0 | 2 | 0 | 4 | 1 | 3 | 1 | 1 | 1 | 1 | 16 |
| Northern Ontario (Guy) | 0 | 0 | 1 | 0 | 1 | 0 | 0 | 0 | 0 | 0 | 0 | 0 | 2 |

=== Draw 6 ===
| Sheet A | 1 | 2 | 3 | 4 | 5 | 6 | 7 | 8 | 9 | 10 | 11 | 12 | Final |
| Ontario (Patrick) | 2 | 0 | 0 | 1 | 4 | 1 | 1 | 0 | 2 | 0 | 2 | 1 | 14 |
| Quebec (Amyot) | 0 | 2 | 3 | 0 | 0 | 0 | 0 | 1 | 0 | 1 | 0 | 0 | 7 |

| Sheet B | 1 | 2 | 3 | 4 | 5 | 6 | 7 | 8 | 9 | 10 | 11 | 12 | Final |
| Prince Edward Island (Hayes) | 4 | 1 | 0 | 0 | 0 | 0 | 1 | 0 | 0 | 0 | 1 | 4 | 11 |
| Saskatchewan (Annabel) | 0 | 0 | 6 | 1 | 1 | 1 | 0 | 0 | 2 | 2 | 0 | 0 | 13 |

| Sheet C | 1 | 2 | 3 | 4 | 5 | 6 | 7 | 8 | 9 | 10 | 11 | 12 | Final |
| Manitoba (Sangster) | 0 | 0 | 1 | 0 | 0 | 3 | 1 | 0 | 2 | 0 | 0 | 2 | 9 |
| British Columbia (D'Amour) | 1 | 1 | 0 | 1 | 1 | 0 | 0 | 2 | 0 | 1 | 1 | 0 | 8 |

| Sheet D | 1 | 2 | 3 | 4 | 5 | 6 | 7 | 8 | 9 | 10 | 11 | 12 | Final |
| New Brunswick (Hollies) | 0 | 2 | 2 | 0 | 3 | 0 | 1 | 0 | 1 | 0 | 0 | 0 | 9 |
| Nova Scotia (Glintz) | 0 | 0 | 0 | 1 | 0 | 4 | 0 | 2 | 0 | 1 | 1 | 1 | 10 |

| Sheet E | 1 | 2 | 3 | 4 | 5 | 6 | 7 | 8 | 9 | 10 | 11 | 12 | Final |
| Alberta (McLaws) | 1 | 0 | 1 | 0 | 3 | 0 | 3 | 1 | 0 | 0 | 0 | 1 | 10 |
| Northern Ontario (Guy) | 0 | 1 | 0 | 2 | 0 | 2 | 0 | 0 | 1 | 1 | 2 | 0 | 9 |

=== Draw 7 ===
| Sheet A | 1 | 2 | 3 | 4 | 5 | 6 | 7 | 8 | 9 | 10 | 11 | 12 | Final |
| Alberta (McLaws) | 2 | 0 | 3 | 0 | 3 | 0 | 2 | 3 | 1 | 2 | 0 | 0 | 16 |
| Prince Edward Island (Hayes) | 0 | 1 | 0 | 1 | 0 | 1 | 0 | 0 | 0 | 0 | 1 | 1 | 5 |

| Sheet B | 1 | 2 | 3 | 4 | 5 | 6 | 7 | 8 | 9 | 10 | 11 | 12 | Final |
| Ontario (Patrick) | 1 | 1 | 1 | 0 | 2 | 0 | 1 | 0 | 3 | 1 | 2 | 3 | 15 |
| Manitoba (Sangster) | 0 | 0 | 0 | 3 | 0 | 2 | 0 | 2 | 0 | 0 | 0 | 0 | 7 |

| Sheet C | 1 | 2 | 3 | 4 | 5 | 6 | 7 | 8 | 9 | 10 | 11 | 12 | Final |
| British Columbia (D'Amour) | 0 | 0 | 1 | 2 | 1 | 0 | 1 | 0 | 1 | 0 | 1 | 2 | 9 |
| Nova Scotia (Glintz) | 2 | 2 | 0 | 0 | 0 | 1 | 0 | 1 | 0 | 1 | 0 | 0 | 7 |

| Sheet D | 1 | 2 | 3 | 4 | 5 | 6 | 7 | 8 | 9 | 10 | 11 | 12 | Final |
| Northern Ontario (Guy) | 0 | 2 | 2 | 0 | 0 | 5 | 1 | 0 | 5 | 0 | 2 | 0 | 17 |
| New Brunswick (Hollies) | 2 | 0 | 0 | 3 | 2 | 0 | 0 | 1 | 0 | 1 | 0 | 1 | 10 |

| Sheet E | 1 | 2 | 3 | 4 | 5 | 6 | 7 | 8 | 9 | 10 | 11 | 12 | Final |
| Quebec (Amyot) | 1 | 0 | 0 | 2 | 0 | 0 | 2 | 1 | 0 | 1 | 0 | 0 | 7 |
| Saskatchewan (Annabel) | 0 | 2 | 1 | 0 | 4 | 1 | 0 | 0 | 3 | 0 | 1 | 0 | 12 |

=== Draw 8 ===
| Sheet A | 1 | 2 | 3 | 4 | 5 | 6 | 7 | 8 | 9 | 10 | 11 | 12 | Final |
| British Columbia (D'Amour) | 1 | 0 | 0 | 1 | 1 | 1 | 0 | 2 | 0 | 3 | 2 | 3 | 14 |
| New Brunswick (Hollies) | 0 | 0 | 1 | 0 | 0 | 0 | 2 | 0 | 3 | 0 | 0 | 0 | 6 |

| Sheet B | 1 | 2 | 3 | 4 | 5 | 6 | 7 | 8 | 9 | 10 | 11 | 12 | Final |
| Saskatchewan (Annabel) | 1 | 3 | 0 | 2 | 2 | 2 | 0 | 0 | 1 | 0 | 2 | 0 | 13 |
| Nova Scotia (Glintz) | 0 | 0 | 1 | 0 | 0 | 0 | 1 | 0 | 0 | 2 | 0 | 4 | 8 |

| Sheet C | 1 | 2 | 3 | 4 | 5 | 6 | 7 | 8 | 9 | 10 | 11 | 12 | Final |
| Northern Ontario (Guy) | 2 | 2 | 2 | 3 | 0 | 2 | 0 | 3 | 0 | 0 | 0 | 2 | 16 |
| Manitoba (Sangster) | 0 | 0 | 0 | 0 | 1 | 0 | 1 | 0 | 3 | 3 | 2 | 0 | 10 |

| Sheet D | 1 | 2 | 3 | 4 | 5 | 6 | 7 | 8 | 9 | 10 | 11 | 12 | Final |
| Alberta (McLaws) | 3 | 0 | 2 | 0 | 0 | 0 | 1 | 1 | 2 | 0 | 0 | 0 | 9 |
| Ontario (Patrick) | 0 | 1 | 0 | 1 | 2 | 2 | 0 | 0 | 0 | 1 | 1 | 2 | 10 |

| Sheet E | 1 | 2 | 3 | 4 | 5 | 6 | 7 | 8 | 9 | 10 | 11 | 12 | Final |
| Prince Edward Island (Hayes) | 3 | 0 | 1 | 0 | 0 | 1 | 1 | 0 | 1 | 3 | 0 | 1 | 11 |
| Quebec (Amyot) | 0 | 1 | 0 | 4 | 2 | 0 | 0 | 4 | 0 | 0 | 2 | 0 | 13 |

=== Draw 9 ===
| Sheet A | 1 | 2 | 3 | 4 | 5 | 6 | 7 | 8 | 9 | 10 | 11 | 12 | Final |
| Ontario (Patrick) | 1 | 4 | 0 | 2 | 1 | 0 | 2 | 1 | 1 | 2 | 1 | 0 | 15 |
| Prince Edward Island (Hayes) | 0 | 0 | 2 | 0 | 0 | 2 | 0 | 0 | 0 | 0 | 0 | 1 | 5 |

| Sheet B | 1 | 2 | 3 | 4 | 5 | 6 | 7 | 8 | 9 | 10 | 11 | 12 | Final |
| Manitoba (Sangster) | 0 | 2 | 0 | 3 | 0 | 1 | 2 | 1 | 0 | 0 | 1 | 1 | 11 |
| New Brunswick (Hollies) | 1 | 0 | 2 | 0 | 1 | 0 | 0 | 0 | 2 | 2 | 0 | 0 | 8 |

| Sheet C | 1 | 2 | 3 | 4 | 5 | 6 | 7 | 8 | 9 | 10 | 11 | 12 | 13 | Final |
| British Columbia (D'Amour) | 0 | 2 | 2 | 0 | 1 | 0 | 2 | 0 | 2 | 1 | 0 | 0 | 1 | 11 |
| Quebec (Amyot) | 2 | 0 | 0 | 1 | 0 | 1 | 0 | 3 | 0 | 0 | 0 | 3 | 0 | 10 |

| Sheet D | 1 | 2 | 3 | 4 | 5 | 6 | 7 | 8 | 9 | 10 | 11 | 12 | Final |
| Nova Scotia (Glintz) | 1 | 0 | 2 | 0 | 1 | 0 | 1 | 1 | 0 | 1 | 0 | 1 | 8 |
| Northern Ontario (Guy) | 0 | 1 | 0 | 1 | 0 | 1 | 0 | 0 | 1 | 0 | 2 | 0 | 6 |

| Sheet E | 1 | 2 | 3 | 4 | 5 | 6 | 7 | 8 | 9 | 10 | 11 | 12 | Final |
| Saskatchewan (Annabel) | 0 | 2 | 0 | 3 | 0 | 0 | 2 | 1 | 0 | 0 | 0 | 0 | 8 |
| Alberta (McLaws) | 1 | 0 | 2 | 0 | 1 | 2 | 0 | 0 | 1 | 2 | 1 | 1 | 11 |
