= 1933 Macdonald Brier =

Canadian men's curling championship

- Host city: Toronto, Ontario
- Arena: Granite Curling Club
- Dates: March 7–9
- Winner: Alberta
- Curling club: Royal CC, Edmonton
- Skip: Cliff Manahan
- Third: Harold Deeton
- Second: Hank Wolfe
- Lead: Bert Ross

The 1933 Macdonald Brier, the Canadian men's national curling championship, was held from March 7 to 9, 1933 at the Granite Club in Toronto, Ontario.

Team Alberta, skipped by Cliff Manahan snapped Manitoba's five year reign as champions and captured their first Brier Tankard with a 6-1 record in round robin play. Both Team Manitoba and Team Ontario would finish tied for second in round robin play with 5-2 records, necessitating a tiebreaker playoff for the runner-up spot. Ontario defeated Manitoba 12-8 in the playoff to finish runner-up.

This was the first Brier in which none of the games went to an extra end.

== Event Summary ==
Coming into the 1933 edition of the Brier, Team Manitoba had won five straight Brier championships (a record that still stands as of 2024). Heading into the last draw (Draw 7), Team Alberta led with a 5-1 record while Team Manitoba and Team Ontario were one game back with 4-2 records.

For Manitoba to have a shot in collecting their sixth straight Brier Tankard, they would have to defeat Alberta to force a tiebreaker playoff. Ontario was still in the mix for the tankard as well, needing a win over Nova Scotia and an Alberta loss to join both Alberta and Manitoba in the tiebreaker playoff. An Alberta win would clinch the championship for them.

Ontario did their job by defeating Nova Scotia 16-5 in 10 ends, but Alberta secured their first Brier Tankard with a convincing 11-3 win over Manitoba in 10 ends. Ontario defeated Manitoba in the tiebreaker game for runner-up 12-8.

== Teams ==
The teams are listed as follows:

Alberta	Manitoba	New Brunswick	Northern Ontario
Royal CC, Edmonton Skip: Cliff Manahan; Third: Harold Deeton; Second: Hank Wolfe; Lead: Bert Ross	Deer Lodge CC, Winnipeg Skip: John Douglas; Third: Jimmy Welsh; Second: Alex Welsh; Lead: Jock Reid	Thistle CC, Saint John Skip: Johnny Malcolm; Third: Don Malcolm; Second: Harold Kinsman; Lead: Ralph Fowler	Kirkland Lake CC, Kirkland Lake Skip: Jerry Abrams; Third: Mel Charron; Second: Thomas Ramsay; Lead: Bert Elliott
Nova Scotia	Ontario	Quebec	Saskatchewan
Bluenose CC, New Glasgow Skip: J.A. Cunningham; Third: Henry McCulloch; Second: J.R. Murray; Lead: Harry Sutherland	Thistle CC, Hamilton Skip: Gordon M. Campbell; Third: Donald A. Campbell; Second: Gordon Coates; Lead: Duncan A. Campbell	Thistle CC, Montreal Skip: H.C. Fortier; Third: Harry Walker; Second: Arthur Condie; Lead: William Weldon	Rosthern CC, Rosthern Skip: Cliff McLauchlan; Third: Fred Hayes; Second: William Stuart; Lead: William Baum

== Round Robin standings ==
Key
Brier champion
Teams to Tiebreaker

Province	Skip	W	L	PF	PA
Alberta	Cliff Manahan	6	1	88	50
Manitoba	John Douglas	5	2	83	52
Ontario	Gordon M. Campbell	5	2	98	51
Saskatchewan	Cliff McLauchlan	4	3	69	84
New Brunswick	John Malcolm	3	4	79	83
Northern Ontario	Jerry Abrams	3	4	68	83
Nova Scotia	J.A. Cunningham	2	5	55	94
Quebec	H.C. Fortier	0	7	54	97

== Round Robin results ==
=== Draw 1 ===
Sheet A	1	2	3	4	5	6	7	8	9	10	11	12	Final
Nova Scotia (Cunningham)	1	0	0	1	1	2	0	2	0	0	1	0	8
Saskatchewan (McLauchlan)	0	3	1	0	0	0	1	0	3	4	0	1	13

Sheet B	1	2	3	4	5	6	7	8	9	10	11	12	Final
Alberta (Manahan)	3	1	0	1	1	2	3	0	1	0	2	0	14
New Brunswick (Malcolm)	0	0	4	0	0	0	0	2	0	1	0	4	11

Sheet C	1	2	3	4	5	6	7	8	9	10	11	12	Final
Northern Ontario (Abrams)	2	0	3	1	0	2	0	3	0	3	0	1	15
Quebec (Fortier)	0	1	0	0	1	0	3	0	1	0	2	0	8

Sheet D	1	2	3	4	5	6	7	8	9	10	11	12	Final
Manitoba (Douglas)	1	0	2	1	2	0	1	0	3	1	0	1	12
Ontario (Campbell)	0	1	0	0	0	2	0	1	0	0	3	0	7

=== Draw 2 ===
Sheet A	1	2	3	4	5	6	7	8	9	10	11	12	Final
Nova Scotia (Cunningham)	0	3	0	2	0	1	2	0	2	0	2	0	12
Quebec (Fortier)	2	0	1	0	2	0	0	1	0	1	0	1	8

Sheet B	1	2	3	4	5	6	7	8	9	10	11	12	Final
New Brunswick (Malcolm)	1	0	0	2	3	1	0	2	0	0	1	0	10
Manitoba (Douglas)	0	1	1	0	0	0	1	0	4	1	0	1	9

Sheet C	1	2	3	4	5	6	7	8	9	10	11	12	Final
Saskatchewan (McLauchlan)	0	0	3	0	1	0	0	1	0	0	0	0	5
Ontario (Campbell)	1	2	0	3	0	1	1	0	3	4	1	1	17

Sheet D	1	2	3	4	5	6	7	8	9	10	11	12	Final
Alberta (Manahan)	2	1	0	0	5	1	0	1	0	1	0	2	13
Northern Ontario (Abrams)	0	0	2	1	0	0	3	0	1	0	3	0	10

=== Draw 3 ===
Sheet A	1	2	3	4	5	6	7	8	9	10	11	12	Final
Saskatchewan (McLauchlan)	3	0	0	0	1	0	2	2	0	3	1	0	12
Northern Ontario (Abrams)	0	0	3	2	0	3	0	0	3	0	0	2	13

Sheet B	1	2	3	4	5	6	7	8	9	10	11	12	Final
New Brunswick (Malcolm)	0	2	0	1	1	0	0	2	2	0	0	0	8
Ontario (Campbell)	3	0	2	0	0	4	4	0	0	3	3	3	22

Sheet C	1	2	3	4	5	6	7	8	9	10	11	12	Final
Manitoba (Douglas)	1	3	0	3	0	4	1	0	1	5	2	X	20
Nova Scotia (Cunningham)	0	0	3	0	1	0	0	2	0	0	0	X	6

Sheet D	1	2	3	4	5	6	7	8	9	10	11	12	Final
Alberta (Manahan)	2	1	0	5	0	1	3	2	X	X	X	X	14
Quebec (Fortier)	0	0	2	0	0	0	0	0	X	X	X	X	2

=== Draw 4 ===
Sheet A	1	2	3	4	5	6	7	8	9	10	11	12	Final
Nova Scotia (Cunningham)	1	0	3	0	0	2	0	0	0	0	2	0	8
Northern Ontario (Abrams)	0	1	0	1	3	0	2	2	2	3	0	2	16

Sheet B	1	2	3	4	5	6	7	8	9	10	11	12	Final
Manitoba (Douglas)	1	0	1	0	1	2	3	0	0	3	0	0	11
Quebec (Fortier)	0	1	0	1	0	0	0	3	1	0	2	2	10

Sheet C	1	2	3	4	5	6	7	8	9	10	11	12	Final
Alberta (Manahan)	1	0	0	4	2	0	2	0	2	0	0	1	12
Ontario (Campbell)	0	1	1	0	0	2	0	3	0	1	1	0	9

Sheet D	1	2	3	4	5	6	7	8	9	10	11	12	Final
New Brunswick (Malcolm)	2	0	2	0	1	0	0	1	1	0	1	1	9
Saskatchewan (McLauchlan)	0	3	0	2	0	2	4	0	0	1	0	0	12

=== Draw 5 ===
Sheet A	1	2	3	4	5	6	7	8	9	10	11	12	Final
New Brunswick (Malcolm)	0	0	0	0	0	0	3	3	0	1	1	0	8
Nova Scotia (Cunningham)	3	1	1	1	2	1	0	0	2	0	0	2	13

Sheet B	1	2	3	4	5	6	7	8	9	10	11	12	Final
Manitoba (Douglas)	1	0	1	0	0	1	3	0	2	2	4	X	14
Northern Ontario (Abrams)	0	3	0	1	1	0	0	1	0	0	0	X	6

Sheet C	1	2	3	4	5	6	7	8	9	10	11	12	Final
Alberta (Manahan)	3	1	0	1	0	1	0	2	1	0	2	0	11
Saskatchewan (McLauchlan)	0	0	3	0	1	0	2	0	0	4	0	2	12

Sheet D	1	2	3	4	5	6	7	8	9	10	11	12	Final
Quebec (Fortier)	0	0	1	0	2	0	0	0	1	0	X	X	4
Ontario (Campbell)	1	3	0	4	0	3	2	1	0	1	X	X	15

=== Draw 6 ===
Sheet A	1	2	3	4	5	6	7	8	9	10	11	12	Final
Alberta (Manahan)	2	2	1	0	3	1	2	1	0	1	X	X	13
Nova Scotia (Cunningham)	0	0	0	2	0	0	0	0	1	0	X	X	3

Sheet B	1	2	3	4	5	6	7	8	9	10	11	12	Final
Quebec (Fortier)	2	2	0	1	0	2	0	0	0	0	0	3	10
New Brunswick (Malcolm)	0	0	1	0	4	0	3	2	2	1	4	0	17

Sheet C	1	2	3	4	5	6	7	8	9	10	11	12	Final
Northern Ontario (Abrams)	0	0	0	1	2	0	0	2	0	0	0	X	5
Ontario (Campbell)	2	1	1	0	0	1	3	0	2	1	1	X	12

Sheet D	1	2	3	4	5	6	7	8	9	10	11	12	Final
Manitoba (Douglas)	0	0	4	3	1	1	4	1	X	X	X	X	14
Saskatchewan (McLauchlan)	1	1	0	0	0	0	0	0	X	X	X	X	2

=== Draw 7 ===
Sheet A	1	2	3	4	5	6	7	8	9	10	11	12	Final
Alberta (Manahan)	0	3	0	1	0	0	3	2	2	0	X	X	11
Manitoba (Douglas)	0	0	1	0	1	0	0	0	0	1	X	X	3

Sheet B	1	2	3	4	5	6	7	8	9	10	11	12	Final
Ontario (Campbell)	0	6	0	0	4	2	1	1	2	0	X	X	16
Nova Scotia (Cunningham)	2	0	1	1	0	0	0	0	0	1	X	X	5

Sheet C	1	2	3	4	5	6	7	8	9	10	11	12	Final
New Brunswick (Malcolm)	3	1	2	2	0	2	3	0	3	X	X	X	16
Northern Ontario (Abrams)	0	0	0	0	1	0	0	2	0	X	X	X	3

Sheet D	1	2	3	4	5	6	7	8	9	10	11	12	Final
Saskatchewan (McLauchlan)	5	0	0	1	2	3	1	0	0	0	1	0	13
Quebec (Fortier)	0	2	1	0	0	0	0	4	3	1	0	1	12

== Tiebreaker ==
Sheet A	1	2	3	4	5	6	7	8	9	10	11	12	Final
Manitoba (Douglas)	2	0	2	0	0	1	0	1	0	0	2	0	8
Ontario (Campbell)	0	1	0	1	3	0	2	0	2	1	0	2	12
