= Glenn Gray (curler) =

Canadian curler (1924–2011)

- Curler
- Born: December 7, 1924; Regina, Saskatchewan
- Died: September 5, 2011 (aged 86)
Medal record
Representing Alberta
Macdonald Brier
Gold medal – first place	1954 Edmonton

Glenn Leigh Gray (December 7, 1924 – September 5, 2011) was a Canadian curler. He played as third on the 1954 Brier-winning Team Alberta, skipped by Matt Baldwin.
