= Jock Reid =

Canadian curler

- Curler
- Born: 1907; Scotland
- Died: April 22, 1965 (aged 57); Winnipeg, Manitoba, Canada

Team
- Curling club: Deer Lodge Curling Club
Medal record
Representing Manitoba
Macdonald Brier
Gold medal – first place	1947 Saint John
Silver medal – second place	1937 Toronto
Bronze medal – third place	1933 Toronto

John Knight Reid (1907 – April 22, 1965) was a Canadian curler. He was a member of 1947 Brier Champion team (skipped by Jimmy Welsh), playing as second, representing Manitoba. A member of the Deer Lodge Curling Club in Winnipeg, he was also a three-time provincial champion. He retired in 1958 and died in 1965.
