= Pete Ferry =

Canadian curler

- Curler
- Born: 1914; Outlook, Saskatchewan, Canada
- Died: February 9, 1971 (aged 56); Hawaii, US
Medal record
Representing Alberta
Macdonald Brier
Gold medal – first place	1954 Edmonton

John Victor "Pete" Ferry (1914 – February 9, 1971) was a Canadian curler. He played as second on the 1954 Brier-winning Team Alberta, skipped by Matt Baldwin.
