= Jim Collins (curler) =

Canadian curler

Jimmy Collins
- Curler
- Born: 1921; Pilot Mound, Manitoba, Canada
- Died: May 21, 1982 (aged 60); Edmonton, Alberta, Canada

Curling career
- Brier: 1 (1954)
Medal record
Representing Alberta
Macdonald Brier
Gold medal – first place	1954 Edmonton

James H. Collins (1921 – May 21, 1982) was a Canadian curler. He played as second on the 1954 Brier-winning Team Alberta, skipped by Matt Baldwin. He died at the age of 60 in 1982.
