= Frenchy D'Amour =

Canadian curler (1912–1995)

Medal record

Men's Curling

Representing British Columbia

Macdonald Brier
Gold medal – first place	1948 Calgary	
Silver medal – second place	1947 Saint John	

Theophile D. "Frenchy" D'Amour (October 10, 1912–September 7, 1995) was a Canadian curler. He skipped the first team from British Columbia to win the Brier, Canada's national men's curling championship in 1948.

== Early life ==
D'Amour was born in Rossland, British Columbia, and was of French origin. According to 1921 and 1931 census records, his parents, Napoleon and Eva were from Quebec, and the family were Catholic. He was nicknamed "Frenchy" while attending school in Rossland. He began curling at the age of 22 while living there, and moved to Trail, British Columbia in 1939. He served in the Canadian Army in World War II for two years where he was a paratrooper. He returned to curling in 1945.

== Curling career ==
In 1946, D'Amour joined up with a team of Trail smelter workers; Scottish-born Bob McGhie at third, second Freddy Wendell originally from Saskatchewan, and Irish-born Jim Mark at lead. All four were skips of their own teams at the Trail Curling Club. They played in the 1946 BC championships, but were knocked out by Frank Avery. The following year, the team won the provincials, sending the team to the 1947 Macdonald Brier, representing British Columbia. At 34 years old, D'Amour was thought to be the youngest ever Brier skip for the province at the time. At the Brier, D'Amour led the team to a 6–3 record in a tie for second place with Saskatchewan's Garnet Campbell rink. This forced a play-off for second place, which B.C. won thanks to a three-ender in the 12th and final end after trailing Saskatchewan.

During the 1948 playdowns, the team started out by losing their first three games just trying to get out of their curling club. The team went on to win the 1948 BC Championship, and were the only team to return to the Brier in 1948. It was only the second time a team had won the BC title twice in a row. At the 1948 Brier, the team became the first champion to represent British Columbia after finishing the event with an 8–1 record. The team clinched the championship after beating Quebec 11–10 in an extra end in the final round in front of a record 5,200 fans. D'Amour drew to a Quebec shot rock for the win. Following the win, the mayor of Trail, Jimmy Bryant, himself a curler, announced a half-day holiday for March 8 in the town.

The team were not able to win the BC Championships in 1949, and "lost out late in competition". Later in the year, D'Amour with team mates Freddy Tinling, Wendell and Johnny Cameron won the first Associated Commercial Travellers (A.C.T.) automobile bonspiel, defeating Leo Johnson of Winnipeg in the final played at Edmonton Gardens. The first prize for the event was a new car, though D'Amour had never driven a car before. He had to be driven back to Trail by Edmonton Journal writer Don "Buckets" Fleming, missing a week of work. D'Amour did not enter provincial playdowns that season.

D'Amour played Leo Johnson in the final of the A.C.T. bonspiel again in 1950, but this time lost to the Manitobans.

D'Amour joined the Reg Stone rink for the 1961–62 season, playing second for the team. D'Amour had actually taught Stone, and his brother, third Roy Stone how to curl. The team won the 1962 BC Championship, defeating Howie Christopherson of Vancouver two games to one in a best of three championship. The team represented British Columbia at the 1962 Macdonald Brier, finishing the event with a 7–3 record, in fourth place.

D'Amour's 1948 Brier winning rink was inducted into the BC Sports Hall of Fame in 1981.

== Personal life ==
D'Amour was married to Clara Elsie Tblus, who disappeared from Ottawa in around 1955. He petitioned the Supreme Court of British Columbia in 1969 for a divorce, as her whereabouts was unknown.
