= Harry Monk =

Canadian curler

- Curler
- Born: c. 1902; Scotland
- Died: November 23, 1979 (aged 77); Winnipeg, Manitoba, Canada

Team
- Curling club: Deer Lodge CC, Winnipeg, MB
Medal record
Representing Manitoba
Macdonald Brier
Gold medal – first place	1947 Saint John
Silver medal – second place	1937 Toronto

Harry A. Monk, Sr. (c. 1902 – November 23, 1979) was a Canadian curler. He was a member of 1947 Brier Champion team (skipped by Jimmy Welsh), playing as lead, representing Manitoba. A member of the Deer Lodge Curling Club in Winnipeg, he was also a three-time provincial champion.
