= Alex Welsh (curler) =

Canadian curler

- Curler
- Born: October 12, 1907; Morningside, Edinburgh, Scotland
- Died: January 4, 1971 (aged 63); Winnipeg, Manitoba, Canada

Team
- Curling club: Deer Lodge CC, Winnipeg, MB
Medal record
Representing Manitoba
Macdonald Brier
Gold medal – first place	1947 Saint John
Bronze medal – third place	1933 Toronto

Alexander William Welsh (October 12, 1907 – January 4, 1971) was a Canadian curler. He was a member of 1947 Brier Champion team (skipped by his younger brother Jimmy Welsh), playing as third, representing Manitoba. A member of the Deer Lodge Curling Club in Winnipeg, Manitoba, he was also a three-time provincial champion.
