= Harold Deeton =

Canadian ice hockey player and curler

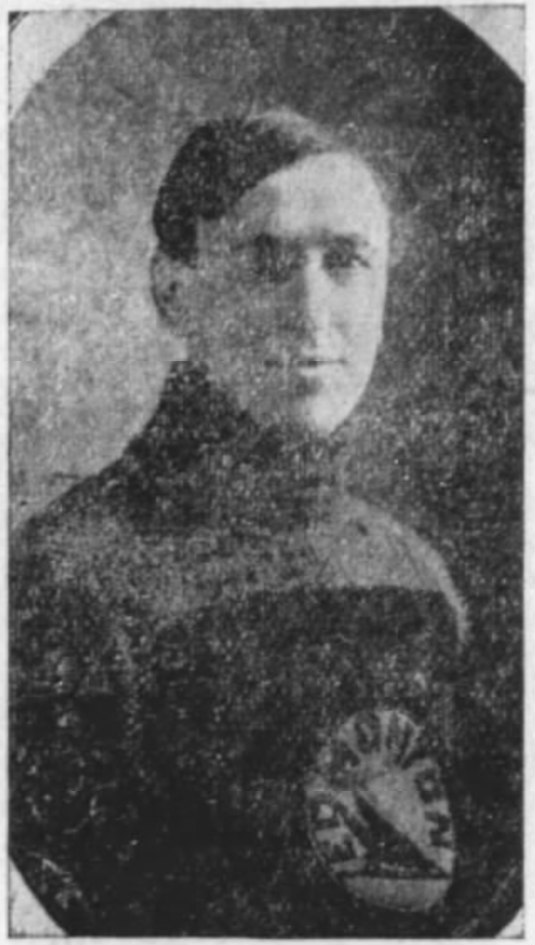
- Deeton with the Edmonton Pros
- Born: July 16, 1882 Plattsville, Ontario, Canada
- Died: July 5, 1969 (aged 86) Camrose, Alberta, Canada
- Position: Rover; Forward
- Shot: Right
- Played for: Edmonton Professionals; Edmonton Dominions
- Playing career: c. 1907–1910; 1916–1917

Harold Chester Deeton (July 16, 1882 – July 5, 1969) was a Canadian professional ice hockey player and curler who was active in the early 1900s. Deeton played professional hockey for the Edmonton Professionals, a team that operated within the Alberta Professional Hockey League for the 1907–08 season and challenged twice for the Stanley Cup.

Deeton was born in Plattsville, Ontario and died in Camrose, Alberta.

== Curling career ==
Deeton won the Macdonald Brier in 1933, playing third for the Alberta team, skipped by Cliff Manahan.

== Ice hockey career ==
Deeton played with the Edmonton Professionals in the APHL in the 1907–08 season and scored 18 goals and 25 points in 10 games that season.

Late in December in 1908, prior to the start of the 1909 season, Edmonton Professionals challenged the reigning Stanley Cup champion Montreal Wanderers of the ECHA for the Cup. Edmonton called in a record number of six ringers for the two game series, amongst them Lester Patrick, Tommy Phillips and Didier Pitre, which forced all team regulars except Fred Whitcroft to the bench for the first game. Edmonton dropped the first game with a score of 3-7, and for the second game the club replaced two of its ringers with regulars Harold Deeton and Jack Miller. Deeton and Miller responded with three and two goals respectively and Edmonton won the second game 7-6, with Deeton scoring the game-winning goal on a rebound from a shot from teammate Steve Vair, but lost the Stanley Cup on total goals aggregate.

In January 1910 the Edmonton Professionals again challenged for the Stanley Cup, this time against the Ottawa Senators of the newly formed NHA. Edmonton lost both games, 4-8 and 7-13, with a total score of 11-21. Deeton netted three of Edmonton goals in the series.

=== Statistics ===
			Regular season					Playoffs
Season	Team	League	GP	G	A	Pts	PIM	GP	G	A	Pts	PIM
1907–08	Edmonton Pros	APHL	10	18	7	25	33	—	—	—	—	—
		Fit-Ref	—	—	—	—	—	9	27	10	37	9
1908–09	Edmonton Pros	Exh.	8	17	0	17	15	—	—	—	—	—
		Stanley Cup	—	—	—	—	—	1	3	0	3	0
		Fit-Ref	—	—	—	—	—	7	23	0	23	6
1909–10	Edmonton Pros	Exh.	—	—	—	—	—	—	—	—	—	—
		Stanley Cup	—	—	—	—	—	2	3	0	3	0
1916–17	Edmonton Dominions	Exh.	1	0	0	0	0	—	—	—	—	—
Fit-Ref totals			—	—	—	—	—	16	50	10	60	15
Stanley Cup totals			—	—	—	—	—	3	6	0	6	0

Statistics from SIHR at sihrhockey.org
