= 1947 Macdonald Brier =

Canadian men's curling championship

- Host city: Saint John, New Brunswick
- Arena: Saint John Arena
- Dates: March 3-6
- Attendance: 10,000
- Winner: Manitoba
- Curling club: Deer Lodge CC, Winnipeg
- Skip: Jimmy Welsh
- Third: Alex Welsh
- Second: Jock Reid
- Lead: Harry Monk Sr.

The 1947 Macdonald Brier, the Canadian men's national curling championship, was held from March 3 to 6, 1947 at Saint John Arena in Saint John, New Brunswick.

Team Manitoba, skipped by Jimmy Welsh, won the Brier Tankard after finishing round robin play unbeaten with a 9-0 record. This was Manitoba's eleventh Brier championship and the fifth time in which a team finished the Brier unbeaten.

British Columbia and Saskatchewan finished round robin play tied for second with 6-3 records, necessitating a tiebreaker playoff for runner-up where British Columbia would beat Saskatchewan 10-9. In the game, Saskatchewan skip Garnet Campbell missed a shot for six in the 11th end, scoring one instead. In the 12th end, BC scored a three-ender to win the game.

== Teams ==
The teams are listed as follows:

| Alberta | British Columbia | Manitoba | New Brunswick | Northern Ontario |
|---|---|---|---|---|
| Calgary CC, Calgary Skip: Howard Palmer; Third: Bob Munro; Second: Chub Irish; Lead: Bill Watson | Trail CC, Trail Skip: Frenchy D'Amour; Third: Robert McGhie; Second: Frederick Wendell; Lead: James Mark | Deer Lodge CC, Winnipeg Skip: Jimmy Welsh; Third: Alex Welsh; Second: Jock Reid; Lead: Harry Monk Sr. | Fredericton CC, Fredericton Skip: Arthur Limerick; Third: Walter Limerick; Second: Victor Limerick; Lead: James Howie | Kirkland Lake CC, Kirkland Lake Skip: Don Best; Third: Thomas Marston; Second: Lynn Williamson; Lead: Harry McNabb |
| Nova Scotia | Ontario | Prince Edward Island | Quebec | Saskatchewan |
| Mayflower CC, Halifax Skip: Jeffrey Flinn; Third: Harold Lanaghan; Second: Reginald Piercey; Lead: William Ward | Toronto CC, Toronto Skip: Nicol MacNicol; Third: Edmond O'Donnell; Second: Gordon Denison; Lead: Adam F. Spencer | Charlottetown CC, Charlottetown Skip: Frank Acorn; Third: Andrew Likely; Second: John Squarebriggs; Lead: Arnett Howatt | Victoria CC, Quebec City Skip: Robert Cream; Third: Thomas Beattie; Second: Herbert Simons; Lead: Tomas DeWolfe | Avonlea CC, Avonlea Skip: Garnet Campbell; Third: Glen Campbell; Second: Lloyd Campbell; Lead: Alexander Campbell |

== Round robin standings ==
Key
| Brier champion |

| Province | Skip | W | L | PF | PA |
|---|---|---|---|---|---|
| Manitoba | Jimmy Welsh | 9 | 0 | 122 | 65 |
| British Columbia | Frenchy D'Amour | 6 | 3 | 90 | 75 |
| Saskatchewan | Garnet Campbell | 6 | 3 | 97 | 91 |
| New Brunswick | Arthur Limerick | 5 | 4 | 100 | 89 |
| Northern Ontario | Don Best | 5 | 4 | 94 | 77 |
| Nova Scotia | Jeffrey Flinn | 4 | 5 | 81 | 87 |
| Alberta | Howard Palmer | 4 | 5 | 95 | 78 |
| Ontario | Nicol MacNicol | 3 | 6 | 83 | 98 |
| Quebec | Robert Cream | 2 | 7 | 79 | 107 |
| Prince Edward Island | Frank Acorn | 1 | 8 | 60 | 134 |

== Round robin results ==
=== Draw 1 ===
| Sheet A | 1 | 2 | 3 | 4 | 5 | 6 | 7 | 8 | 9 | 10 | 11 | 12 | Final |
| New Brunswick (Limerick) | 0 | 3 | 0 | 1 | 0 | 1 | 0 | 0 | 1 | 0 | 1 | 2 | 9 |
| Manitoba (Welsh) | 1 | 0 | 1 | 0 | 3 | 0 | 2 | 1 | 0 | 2 | 0 | 0 | 10 |

| Sheet B | 1 | 2 | 3 | 4 | 5 | 6 | 7 | 8 | 9 | 10 | 11 | 12 | Final |
| Prince Edward Island (Acorn) | 0 | 0 | 0 | 0 | 2 | 0 | 1 | 0 | 1 | 0 | 1 | 0 | 5 |
| British Columbia (D'Amour) | 1 | 1 | 0 | 3 | 0 | 3 | 0 | 5 | 0 | 1 | 0 | 1 | 15 |

| Sheet C | 1 | 2 | 3 | 4 | 5 | 6 | 7 | 8 | 9 | 10 | 11 | 12 | Final |
| Alberta (Palmer) | 0 | 2 | 1 | 4 | 0 | 1 | 0 | 0 | 4 | 0 | 2 | 1 | 15 |
| Quebec (Cream) | 1 | 0 | 0 | 0 | 1 | 0 | 2 | 1 | 0 | 2 | 0 | 0 | 7 |

| Sheet D | 1 | 2 | 3 | 4 | 5 | 6 | 7 | 8 | 9 | 10 | 11 | 12 | Final |
| Ontario (MacNichol) | 1 | 0 | 0 | 1 | 3 | 0 | 4 | 0 | 1 | 1 | 0 | 0 | 11 |
| Saskatchewan (Campbell) | 0 | 2 | 1 | 0 | 0 | 2 | 0 | 4 | 0 | 0 | 2 | 2 | 13 |

| Sheet E | 1 | 2 | 3 | 4 | 5 | 6 | 7 | 8 | 9 | 10 | 11 | 12 | Final |
| Northern Ontario (Best) | 0 | 3 | 0 | 1 | 0 | 0 | 1 | 1 | 0 | 1 | 0 | 1 | 8 |
| Nova Scotia (Flinn) | 1 | 0 | 0 | 0 | 1 | 2 | 0 | 0 | 1 | 0 | 2 | 0 | 7 |

=== Draw 2 ===
| Sheet A | 1 | 2 | 3 | 4 | 5 | 6 | 7 | 8 | 9 | 10 | 11 | 12 | Final |
| Alberta (Palmer) | 3 | 1 | 0 | 0 | 0 | 1 | 1 | 0 | 0 | 0 | 0 | 1 | 7 |
| British Columbia (D'Amour) | 0 | 0 | 0 | 1 | 1 | 0 | 0 | 2 | 1 | 3 | 3 | 0 | 11 |

| Sheet B | 1 | 2 | 3 | 4 | 5 | 6 | 7 | 8 | 9 | 10 | 11 | 12 | Final |
| Northern Ontario (Best) | 0 | 0 | 1 | 0 | 2 | 0 | 0 | 2 | 0 | 1 | 0 | 4 | 10 |
| Manitoba (Welsh) | 1 | 2 | 0 | 1 | 0 | 1 | 0 | 0 | 2 | 0 | 5 | 0 | 12 |

| Sheet C | 1 | 2 | 3 | 4 | 5 | 6 | 7 | 8 | 9 | 10 | 11 | 12 | Final |
| Quebec (Cream) | 2 | 3 | 1 | 0 | 2 | 0 | 0 | 3 | 2 | 0 | 2 | 0 | 15 |
| New Brunswick (Limerick) | 0 | 0 | 0 | 1 | 0 | 4 | 1 | 0 | 0 | 1 | 0 | 1 | 8 |

| Sheet D | 1 | 2 | 3 | 4 | 5 | 6 | 7 | 8 | 9 | 10 | 11 | 12 | Final |
| Saskatchewan (Campbell) | 0 | 0 | 0 | 0 | 0 | 1 | 0 | 1 | 0 | 1 | 0 | 1 | 4 |
| Nova Scotia (Flinn) | 1 | 3 | 1 | 3 | 2 | 0 | 1 | 0 | 1 | 0 | 3 | 0 | 15 |

| Sheet E | 1 | 2 | 3 | 4 | 5 | 6 | 7 | 8 | 9 | 10 | 11 | 12 | Final |
| Prince Edward Island (Acorn) | 0 | 0 | 1 | 0 | 1 | 1 | 1 | 1 | 0 | 0 | 0 | 1 | 6 |
| Ontario (MacNichol) | 1 | 1 | 0 | 3 | 0 | 0 | 0 | 0 | 2 | 1 | 1 | 0 | 9 |

=== Draw 3 ===
| Sheet A | 1 | 2 | 3 | 4 | 5 | 6 | 7 | 8 | 9 | 10 | 11 | 12 | Final |
| Alberta (Palmer) | 1 | 0 | 0 | 0 | 1 | 1 | 0 | 2 | 0 | 2 | 0 | 1 | 8 |
| Ontario (MacNichol) | 0 | 1 | 1 | 1 | 0 | 0 | 2 | 0 | 2 | 0 | 2 | 0 | 9 |

| Sheet B | 1 | 2 | 3 | 4 | 5 | 6 | 7 | 8 | 9 | 10 | 11 | 12 | Final |
| Manitoba (Welsh) | 2 | 2 | 0 | 0 | 3 | 4 | 2 | 5 | 0 | 3 | 1 | 0 | 22 |
| Saskatchewan (Campbell) | 0 | 0 | 1 | 2 | 0 | 0 | 0 | 0 | 3 | 0 | 0 | 1 | 7 |

| Sheet C | 1 | 2 | 3 | 4 | 5 | 6 | 7 | 8 | 9 | 10 | 11 | 12 | Final |
| British Columbia (D'Amour) | 0 | 0 | 0 | 1 | 0 | 1 | 0 | 0 | 3 | 1 | 0 | 1 | 7 |
| New Brunswick (Limerick) | 1 | 1 | 1 | 0 | 1 | 0 | 4 | 1 | 0 | 0 | 2 | 0 | 11 |

| Sheet D | 1 | 2 | 3 | 4 | 5 | 6 | 7 | 8 | 9 | 10 | 11 | 12 | Final |
| Northern Ontario (Best) | 2 | 0 | 1 | 0 | 4 | 0 | 0 | 0 | 0 | 2 | 3 | 1 | 13 |
| Quebec (Cream) | 0 | 0 | 0 | 1 | 0 | 1 | 1 | 2 | 2 | 0 | 0 | 0 | 7 |

| Sheet E | 1 | 2 | 3 | 4 | 5 | 6 | 7 | 8 | 9 | 10 | 11 | 12 | Final |
| Nova Scotia (Flinn) | 1 | 1 | 2 | 0 | 4 | 1 | 1 | 0 | 1 | 0 | 0 | 1 | 12 |
| Prince Edward Island (Acorn) | 0 | 0 | 0 | 1 | 0 | 0 | 0 | 4 | 0 | 2 | 2 | 0 | 9 |

=== Draw 4 ===
| Sheet A | 1 | 2 | 3 | 4 | 5 | 6 | 7 | 8 | 9 | 10 | 11 | 12 | Final |
| Manitoba (Welsh) | 0 | 0 | 0 | 1 | 0 | 2 | 1 | 0 | 0 | 3 | 1 | 1 | 9 |
| Alberta (Palmer) | 1 | 2 | 1 | 0 | 1 | 0 | 0 | 1 | 1 | 0 | 0 | 0 | 7 |

| Sheet B | 1 | 2 | 3 | 4 | 5 | 6 | 7 | 8 | 9 | 10 | 11 | 12 | Final |
| British Columbia (D'Amour) | 0 | 0 | 2 | 0 | 0 | 0 | 1 | 0 | 0 | 1 | 2 | 3 | 9 |
| Saskatchewan (Campbell) | 2 | 1 | 0 | 1 | 1 | 2 | 0 | 1 | 2 | 0 | 0 | 0 | 10 |

| Sheet C | 1 | 2 | 3 | 4 | 5 | 6 | 7 | 8 | 9 | 10 | 11 | 12 | Final |
| New Brunswick (Limerick) | 1 | 0 | 2 | 1 | 0 | 2 | 0 | 2 | 2 | 0 | 1 | 1 | 12 |
| Nova Scotia (Flinn) | 0 | 2 | 0 | 0 | 1 | 0 | 1 | 0 | 0 | 1 | 0 | 0 | 5 |

| Sheet D | 1 | 2 | 3 | 4 | 5 | 6 | 7 | 8 | 9 | 10 | 11 | 12 | Final |
| Ontario (MacNichol) | 0 | 0 | 1 | 0 | 1 | 0 | 2 | 0 | 0 | 1 | 1 | 0 | 6 |
| Northern Ontario (Best) | 0 | 3 | 0 | 1 | 0 | 1 | 0 | 1 | 1 | 0 | 0 | 2 | 9 |

| Sheet E | 1 | 2 | 3 | 4 | 5 | 6 | 7 | 8 | 9 | 10 | 11 | 12 | Final |
| Prince Edward Island (Acorn) | 1 | 0 | 2 | 0 | 0 | 1 | 0 | 4 | 1 | 0 | 2 | 0 | 11 |
| Quebec (Cream) | 0 | 2 | 0 | 1 | 2 | 0 | 1 | 0 | 0 | 1 | 0 | 1 | 8 |

=== Draw 5 ===
| Sheet A | 1 | 2 | 3 | 4 | 5 | 6 | 7 | 8 | 9 | 10 | 11 | 12 | Final |
| British Columbia (D'Amour) | 0 | 2 | 1 | 1 | 0 | 0 | 0 | 2 | 0 | 0 | 1 | 0 | 7 |
| Manitoba (Welsh) | 2 | 0 | 0 | 0 | 2 | 0 | 1 | 0 | 2 | 1 | 0 | 2 | 10 |

| Sheet B | 1 | 2 | 3 | 4 | 5 | 6 | 7 | 8 | 9 | 10 | 11 | 12 | Final |
| Prince Edward Island (Acorn) | 0 | 0 | 0 | 0 | 1 | 0 | 1 | 1 | 0 | 4 | 1 | 0 | 8 |
| Northern Ontario (Best) | 1 | 2 | 3 | 2 | 0 | 4 | 0 | 0 | 4 | 0 | 0 | 1 | 17 |

| Sheet C | 1 | 2 | 3 | 4 | 5 | 6 | 7 | 8 | 9 | 10 | 11 | 12 | Final |
| Alberta (Palmer) | 2 | 0 | 1 | 0 | 0 | 2 | 1 | 0 | 0 | 0 | 1 | 1 | 8 |
| Nova Scotia (Flinn) | 0 | 1 | 0 | 1 | 1 | 0 | 0 | 4 | 1 | 3 | 0 | 0 | 11 |

| Sheet D | 1 | 2 | 3 | 4 | 5 | 6 | 7 | 8 | 9 | 10 | 11 | 12 | Final |
| New Brunswick (Limerick) | 0 | 2 | 1 | 0 | 2 | 0 | 0 | 1 | 0 | 1 | 0 | 0 | 7 |
| Saskatchewan (Campbell) | 1 | 0 | 0 | 2 | 0 | 2 | 1 | 0 | 1 | 0 | 2 | 2 | 11 |

| Sheet E | 1 | 2 | 3 | 4 | 5 | 6 | 7 | 8 | 9 | 10 | 11 | 12 | Final |
| Ontario (MacNichol) | 3 | 2 | 3 | 1 | 2 | 1 | 0 | 0 | 0 | 2 | 3 | 0 | 17 |
| Quebec (Cream) | 0 | 0 | 0 | 0 | 0 | 0 | 1 | 2 | 4 | 0 | 0 | 2 | 9 |

=== Draw 6 ===
| Sheet A | 1 | 2 | 3 | 4 | 5 | 6 | 7 | 8 | 9 | 10 | 11 | 12 | Final |
| Manitoba (Welsh) | 2 | 0 | 3 | 0 | 1 | 0 | 3 | 2 | 1 | 2 | 1 | 0 | 15 |
| Nova Scotia (Flinn) | 0 | 2 | 0 | 1 | 0 | 1 | 0 | 0 | 0 | 0 | 0 | 1 | 5 |

| Sheet B | 1 | 2 | 3 | 4 | 5 | 6 | 7 | 8 | 9 | 10 | 11 | 12 | Final |
| Prince Edward Island (Acorn) | 0 | 0 | 0 | 0 | 0 | 0 | 1 | 0 | 0 | 0 | 0 | 0 | 1 |
| Alberta (Palmer) | 1 | 1 | 2 | 1 | 4 | 1 | 0 | 3 | 4 | 1 | 1 | 2 | 21 |

| Sheet C | 1 | 2 | 3 | 4 | 5 | 6 | 7 | 8 | 9 | 10 | 11 | 12 | Final |
| Quebec (Cream) | 2 | 0 | 2 | 0 | 0 | 0 | 1 | 0 | 0 | 0 | 2 | 0 | 7 |
| British Columbia (D'Amour) | 0 | 1 | 0 | 4 | 1 | 1 | 0 | 1 | 1 | 1 | 0 | 2 | 12 |

| Sheet D | 1 | 2 | 3 | 4 | 5 | 6 | 7 | 8 | 9 | 10 | 11 | 12 | Final |
| Saskatchewan (Campbell) | 0 | 1 | 1 | 1 | 0 | 0 | 3 | 0 | 1 | 0 | 0 | 0 | 7 |
| Northern Ontario (Best) | 1 | 0 | 0 | 0 | 2 | 1 | 0 | 1 | 0 | 3 | 0 | 2 | 10 |

| Sheet E | 1 | 2 | 3 | 4 | 5 | 6 | 7 | 8 | 9 | 10 | 11 | 12 | Final |
| Ontario (MacNichol) | 1 | 0 | 0 | 0 | 1 | 2 | 0 | 0 | 3 | 0 | 1 | 0 | 8 |
| New Brunswick (Limerick) | 0 | 2 | 2 | 5 | 0 | 0 | 2 | 3 | 0 | 1 | 0 | 2 | 17 |

=== Draw 7 ===
| Sheet A | 1 | 2 | 3 | 4 | 5 | 6 | 7 | 8 | 9 | 10 | 11 | 12 | Final |
| Quebec (Cream) | 0 | 1 | 0 | 2 | 0 | 0 | 2 | 0 | 0 | 1 | 1 | 0 | 7 |
| Manitoba (Welsh) | 1 | 0 | 2 | 0 | 3 | 1 | 0 | 3 | 1 | 0 | 0 | 0 | 11 |

| Sheet B | 1 | 2 | 3 | 4 | 5 | 6 | 7 | 8 | 9 | 10 | 11 | 12 | Final |
| Saskatchewan (Campbell) | 1 | 2 | 3 | 0 | 0 | 0 | 2 | 3 | 2 | 3 | 1 | 1 | 18 |
| Prince Edward Island (Acorn) | 0 | 0 | 0 | 1 | 2 | 1 | 0 | 0 | 0 | 0 | 0 | 0 | 4 |

| Sheet C | 1 | 2 | 3 | 4 | 5 | 6 | 7 | 8 | 9 | 10 | 11 | 12 | Final |
| Northern Ontario (Best) | 0 | 1 | 1 | 0 | 1 | 0 | 3 | 0 | 3 | 0 | 0 | 1 | 10 |
| British Columbia (D'Amour) | 2 | 0 | 0 | 2 | 0 | 2 | 0 | 1 | 0 | 3 | 1 | 0 | 11 |

| Sheet D | 1 | 2 | 3 | 4 | 5 | 6 | 7 | 8 | 9 | 10 | 11 | 12 | Final |
| Nova Scotia (Flinn) | 0 | 1 | 1 | 0 | 3 | 3 | 2 | 0 | 0 | 2 | 0 | 0 | 12 |
| Ontario (MacNichol) | 1 | 0 | 0 | 2 | 0 | 0 | 0 | 1 | 2 | 0 | 1 | 2 | 9 |

| Sheet E | 1 | 2 | 3 | 4 | 5 | 6 | 7 | 8 | 9 | 10 | 11 | 12 | 13 | Final |
| New Brunswick (Limerick) | 1 | 0 | 1 | 1 | 1 | 1 | 1 | 0 | 3 | 0 | 0 | 0 | 0 | 9 |
| Alberta (Palmer) | 0 | 1 | 0 | 0 | 0 | 0 | 0 | 1 | 0 | 3 | 2 | 2 | 5 | 14 |

=== Draw 8 ===
| Sheet A | 1 | 2 | 3 | 4 | 5 | 6 | 7 | 8 | 9 | 10 | 11 | 12 | Final |
| Manitoba (Welsh) | 1 | 1 | 1 | 0 | 0 | 1 | 0 | 7 | 2 | 1 | 0 | 4 | 18 |
| Prince Edward Island (Acorn) | 0 | 0 | 0 | 3 | 2 | 0 | 1 | 0 | 0 | 0 | 1 | 0 | 7 |

| Sheet B | 1 | 2 | 3 | 4 | 5 | 6 | 7 | 8 | 9 | 10 | 11 | 12 | 13 | Final |
| Northern Ontario (Best) | 1 | 0 | 0 | 2 | 0 | 1 | 0 | 2 | 0 | 0 | 1 | 3 | 0 | 10 |
| New Brunswick (Limerick) | 0 | 1 | 1 | 0 | 1 | 0 | 2 | 0 | 4 | 1 | 0 | 0 | 1 | 11 |

| Sheet C | 1 | 2 | 3 | 4 | 5 | 6 | 7 | 8 | 9 | 10 | 11 | 12 | Final |
| Nova Scotia (Flinn) | 2 | 0 | 0 | 1 | 1 | 0 | 1 | 0 | 2 | 0 | 0 | 0 | 7 |
| Quebec (Cream) | 0 | 3 | 3 | 0 | 0 | 1 | 0 | 1 | 0 | 1 | 2 | 2 | 13 |

| Sheet D | 1 | 2 | 3 | 4 | 5 | 6 | 7 | 8 | 9 | 10 | 11 | 12 | Final |
| British Columbia (D'Amour) | 0 | 1 | 0 | 1 | 1 | 0 | 3 | 0 | 2 | 1 | 0 | 0 | 9 |
| Ontario (MacNichol) | 3 | 0 | 1 | 0 | 0 | 1 | 0 | 1 | 0 | 0 | 1 | 1 | 8 |

| Sheet E | 1 | 2 | 3 | 4 | 5 | 6 | 7 | 8 | 9 | 10 | 11 | 12 | Final |
| Saskatchewan (Campbell) | 0 | 0 | 3 | 3 | 0 | 2 | 1 | 0 | 3 | 1 | 0 | 1 | 14 |
| Alberta (Palmer) | 1 | 3 | 0 | 0 | 1 | 0 | 0 | 1 | 0 | 0 | 1 | 0 | 7 |

=== Draw 9 ===
| Sheet A | 1 | 2 | 3 | 4 | 5 | 6 | 7 | 8 | 9 | 10 | 11 | 12 | Final |
| Ontario (MacNichol) | 0 | 1 | 0 | 0 | 0 | 0 | 2 | 0 | 1 | 0 | 1 | 1 | 6 |
| Manitoba (Welsh) | 2 | 0 | 3 | 1 | 1 | 1 | 0 | 2 | 0 | 5 | 0 | 0 | 15 |

| Sheet B | 1 | 2 | 3 | 4 | 5 | 6 | 7 | 8 | 9 | 10 | 11 | 12 | Final |
| Nova Scotia (Flinn) | 0 | 1 | 0 | 0 | 0 | 0 | 0 | 1 | 2 | 2 | 1 | 0 | 7 |
| British Columbia (D'Amour) | 1 | 0 | 1 | 2 | 1 | 1 | 1 | 0 | 0 | 0 | 0 | 2 | 9 |

| Sheet C | 1 | 2 | 3 | 4 | 5 | 6 | 7 | 8 | 9 | 10 | 11 | 12 | Final |
| Saskatchewan (Campbell) | 0 | 0 | 2 | 1 | 0 | 5 | 2 | 1 | 0 | 1 | 1 | 0 | 13 |
| Quebec (Cream) | 2 | 1 | 0 | 0 | 1 | 0 | 0 | 0 | 1 | 0 | 0 | 1 | 6 |

| Sheet D | 1 | 2 | 3 | 4 | 5 | 6 | 7 | 8 | 9 | 10 | 11 | 12 | Final |
| New Brunswick (Limerick) | 0 | 0 | 4 | 0 | 4 | 2 | 0 | 2 | 0 | 3 | 1 | 0 | 16 |
| Prince Edward Island (Acorn) | 2 | 1 | 0 | 1 | 0 | 0 | 1 | 0 | 1 | 0 | 0 | 3 | 9 |

| Sheet E | 1 | 2 | 3 | 4 | 5 | 6 | 7 | 8 | 9 | 10 | 11 | 12 | Final |
| Alberta (Palmer) | 1 | 2 | 1 | 0 | 0 | 2 | 0 | 1 | 0 | 0 | 1 | 0 | 8 |
| Northern Ontario (Best) | 0 | 0 | 0 | 1 | 2 | 0 | 1 | 0 | 1 | 1 | 0 | 1 | 7 |

== Playoff ==
| Sheet A | 1 | 2 | 3 | 4 | 5 | 6 | 7 | 8 | 9 | 10 | 11 | 12 | Final |
| British Columbia (D'Amour) | 0 | 0 | 2 | 0 | 1 | 2 | 0 | 0 | 0 | 2 | 0 | 3 | 10 |
| Saskatchewan (Campbell) | 1 | 1 | 0 | 2 | 0 | 0 | 1 | 1 | 2 | 0 | 1 | 0 | 9 |
