= Cliff Manahan =

Canadian curler

Clifford Ross "Cliff" Manahan (October 11, 1888 – March 20, 1970) was a Canadian curler from Edmonton, Alberta.

Manahan was born and raised in Fort William, Ontario (later Thunder Bay) and moved to Edmonton in 1926. He won eight provincial titles and won two Briers- in 1933 and 1937. He was inducted into the Alberta Sports Hall of Fame in 1966.

Manahan (and teammates Harold Deeton, Harold L. "Hank" Wolfe and I. H. "Bert" Ross) won his first provincial title in 1933 and won the Brier as well that year, posting a 6-1 record. He made his second Brier in 1937 (with teammates Wes Robinson, Ross Manahan and Lloyd McIntyre), winning it again by defeating Manitoba in a tie breaker, posting a 9-1 record.

Manahan was runner up the following year, losing his only match to the eventual winners in Manitoba, skipped by Ab Gowanlock. He made it to the Brier again in 1940, finishing with a 6-3 record. He won three provincial titles in a row from 1943 to 1945, but there was no Brier held those years due to World War II. He made his last Brier in 1950, placing third with a 6-4 record.

He was inducted into the Canadian Curling Hall of Fame in 1975.

== Personal life ==
Manahan began work with the Board of Grain Commissioners in 1905, and later became the Grain chairman of the Appeal Tribunal for the Board of Grain Commissioners. He retired in 1955. He was twice married. First to Elizabeth Mary Jones from 1913 until her death in 1949 and then to He married Mary Watson Eckert (née McAndrew) in 1951. He had seven children with his first wife.
