= Jimmy Welsh (curler) =

Canadian curler

- Curler
- Born: February 10, 1910; South Leith, Scotland
- Died: October 24, 1988 (aged 78); Winnipeg, Manitoba, Canada

Team
- Curling club: Deer Lodge Curling Club
Medal record
Representing Manitoba
Macdonald Brier
Gold medal – first place	1947 Saint John
Silver medal – second place	1937 Toronto
Bronze medal – third place	1933 Toronto

James Oddie Welsh (February 10, 1910 – October 24, 1988) was a Canadian curler. He was the skip of the 1947 Brier Champion team, representing Manitoba. A member of the Deer Lodge Curling Club in Winnipeg, he was also a three-time provincial champion. He died in 1988 and was buried at Chapel Lawn Memorial Gardens in Winnipeg.
