= Tom Ramsay (curler) =

Canadian curler (1901–1995)

Medal record

Men's Curling

Representing Northern Ontario

Macdonald Brier
Gold medal – first place	1950 Vancouver	
Silver medal – second place	1946 Saskatoon	

Thomas Ramsay (May 14, 1901 – April 3, 1995) was an English-born Canadian curler. He skipped the Northern Ontario team to a Brier championship in 1950.

== Early life ==
Ramsay was born in North Ashton, Lancashire, England. He left England in 1919, and settled in Kirkland Lake, Ontario in 1923 to work at the Lake Shore Gold Mines, eventually becoming a shift boss.

== Men's career ==
After starting his curling career in 1931, Ramsay won his first Northern Ontario Men's Provincial Curling Championship in 1933, playing second on a rink skipped by Jerry Abrams. The team represented Northern Ontario at the 1933 Macdonald Brier, where they finished with a 3–4 record.

In 1945 he won the Grand Aggregate at the T. and N.O. Bonspiel. The following year, he won the Northern Ontario men's championship again. Leading his team of Wally Spencer, M. G. "Stub" Coughlin and Pat Colquhoun, he defeated the Roy Chisholm rink from Sault Ste. Marie in the Northern Ontario final, two games to three. The win sent the team to the 1946 Macdonald Brier to represent Northern Ontario. There, Ramsay led his rink to a 7–2 round-robin record, in a tie for first place with Manitoba's Leo Johnson and Alberta's Billy Rose, forcing a playoff. Northern Ontario was granted a bye to the final, where they faced off against Alberta, who had beaten Manitoba in the previous playoff match. Their game against Alberta came down to Ramsay's last shot, which was a "fraction too heavy", leaving a lone Alberta rock in the house to score, giving the Rose rink the 1946 Brier Tankard championship. The game wrapped up at 2:30am.

Ramsay won his third Northern Ontario men's title in 1950, when he led his team of Len Williamson, Bill Weston and Billy Kenny to a 3–0 double round robin record at the provincial championship (a fourth game was not needed), beating out teams from Port Arthur (Frank Sargent) and Little Current (Roy Roszey). The Ramsay rink lost just one game in the playdowns that season, with 22 wins. At the 1950 Macdonald Brier, Ramsay led his rink to another 7–2 record. This time however, they avoided a playoff, clinching the national championship for Northern Ontario, in the team's first season together. It would be the first ever Brier title for Northern Ontario. Upon returning home to Kirkland Lake, 10,000 people gathered at a civic reception at the town hall to welcome the team back.

Ramsay was not able to return to the Northern Ontario championship in 1951, as his rink lost out in the Temiskaming and Northern Ontario (TNO) Curling Association British Consols that season. Ramsay did win the TNO Consols the following year, sending his rink to the 1952 Northern Ontario Championship. At the Northern Ontario Championship, Ramsay led his rink to a 2–2 record, finishing behind Jim Guy of Kenora and ahead of Hugh Munro of Copper Cliff.

Ramsay again made it to the Northern Ontario championship in 1960, finishing with a 2–2 record again, behind the champion Don Groom rink from Sudbury, and ahead of the Ted Adair rink from Dryden. Ramsay made it to provincials again in 1963, finishing yet again with a 2–2 record behind the winning Doug Gathercole rink of Copper Cliff and head of Jim Guy of Kenora.

== Seniors career ==
After retiring as a miner in 1963, he moved to Toronto where he curled out of the High Park Club. In his first season in Toronto, he skipped one of the two High Park teams that won the Governor General's trophy in 1964. In 1965, he played in the Ontario Senior Men's Curling Championship. He played in the Ontario Seniors again in 1968, where he finished in second place behind the 72 year old Andy Grant and his rink from Unionville. He made it again in 1971, where he finished with a 3–3 record.

== Later life and personal ==
Ramsay eventually moved back to Northern Ontario, moving to North Bay in the 1980s.

He died at the Leisureworld Nursing Home in 1995. He was married and had one son. He worked as the safety director at the Lake Shore Mine in Kirkland Lake. In addition to curling, he also played soccer and sailed.
