= Frank Sargent (sports executive) =

Canadian sports executive (1902–1988)

- Born: July 6, 1902; Fergus, Ontario, Canada
- Died: September 28, 1988 (aged 86); Thunder Bay, Ontario, Canada
- Education: Canadian School of Embalming
- Occupation: Funeral director
- Years active: 1926 to 1988
- Known for: Canadian Amateur Hockey Association; Thunder Bay Amateur Hockey Association; Dominion Curling Association; Northwestern Ontario Curling Association
- Awards: Canadian Centennial Medal; Queen Elizabeth II Silver Jubilee Medal
- Honours: Canadian Curling Hall of Fame; Northwestern Ontario Sports Hall of Fame

Frank Sargent
Medal record

Men's Curling

Representing Northern Ontario

Macdonald Brier
Bronze medal – third place	1953 Sudbury	

Frank Forest Sargent (July 6, 1902 – September 28, 1988) was a Canadian sports executive in ice hockey and curling. He served as president of the Canadian Amateur Hockey Association (CAHA) from 1942 to 1945, and was president of the Dominion Curling Association (DCA) from 1965 to 1966. He was the first person to be elected to more than two terms as CAHA president, and the first to be president of two national amateur sporting associations in Canada.

Sargent served as a Thunder Bay Amateur Hockey Association executive for 27 years, including two terms as its president. He served on the CAHA committee to negotiate professional-amateur agreements with the National Hockey League (NHL) from 1938 to 1955, and helped negotiate recognition each organization's authority over the game, payments from professional clubs to amateur clubs for developing hockey players, and common usage of the ice hockey rules. He sought for enforcement of rules to ensure fast, clean play without injuries, and disliked the increasing physical style of the game. His time as president of the CAHA coincided with World War II, and he supported the purchase of Victory bonds to assist the war effort, and facilitated the supply of players to fill NHL rosters lacking numbers due to military service. Under his leadership, junior ice hockey profits from the Memorial Cup were reinvested into the development of minor ice hockey in Canada; but senior ice hockey struggled with the loss of Canadian Army and Royal Canadian Air Force teams, which led to his decision to cancel national playoffs for the Allan Cup in 1945.

Sargent served multiple terms as president of the Port Arthur Curling Club, and led its effort to affiliate with the Manitoba Curling Association. He later assisted in founding the Northwestern Ontario Curling Association, became its inaugural president in 1947, and sought for recognition as its own branch within the DCA to compete for The Brier national championship. He played second on the rink that won the 1953 Northern Ontario Men's Provincial Curling Championship, and placed third at the 1953 Brier championship. As a member of the DCA executive, he assisted in establishing both the Canadian Mixed Curling Championship and the Canadian Senior Curling Championships in 1964. He was an original member of the senior championship committee, and believed the event would attract former Brier competitors and give seniors place to compete which had not existed.

Sargent's career in sports was recognized with the Canadian Centennial Medal in 1967, and the Queen Elizabeth II Silver Jubilee Medal in 1977. He also received awards, citations and life memberships from multiple sporting and service organizations; including life membership of the CAHA in 1946 and life membership of the DCA in 1967. When hockey and curling established a Hall of Fame for their respective sport, he was named to the selection committees to choose the inaugural group of inductees for each sport. He was inducted into the Canadian Curling Hall of Fame in 1974, and inducted into the Northwestern Ontario Sports Hall of Fame in 1982.

== Early life ==
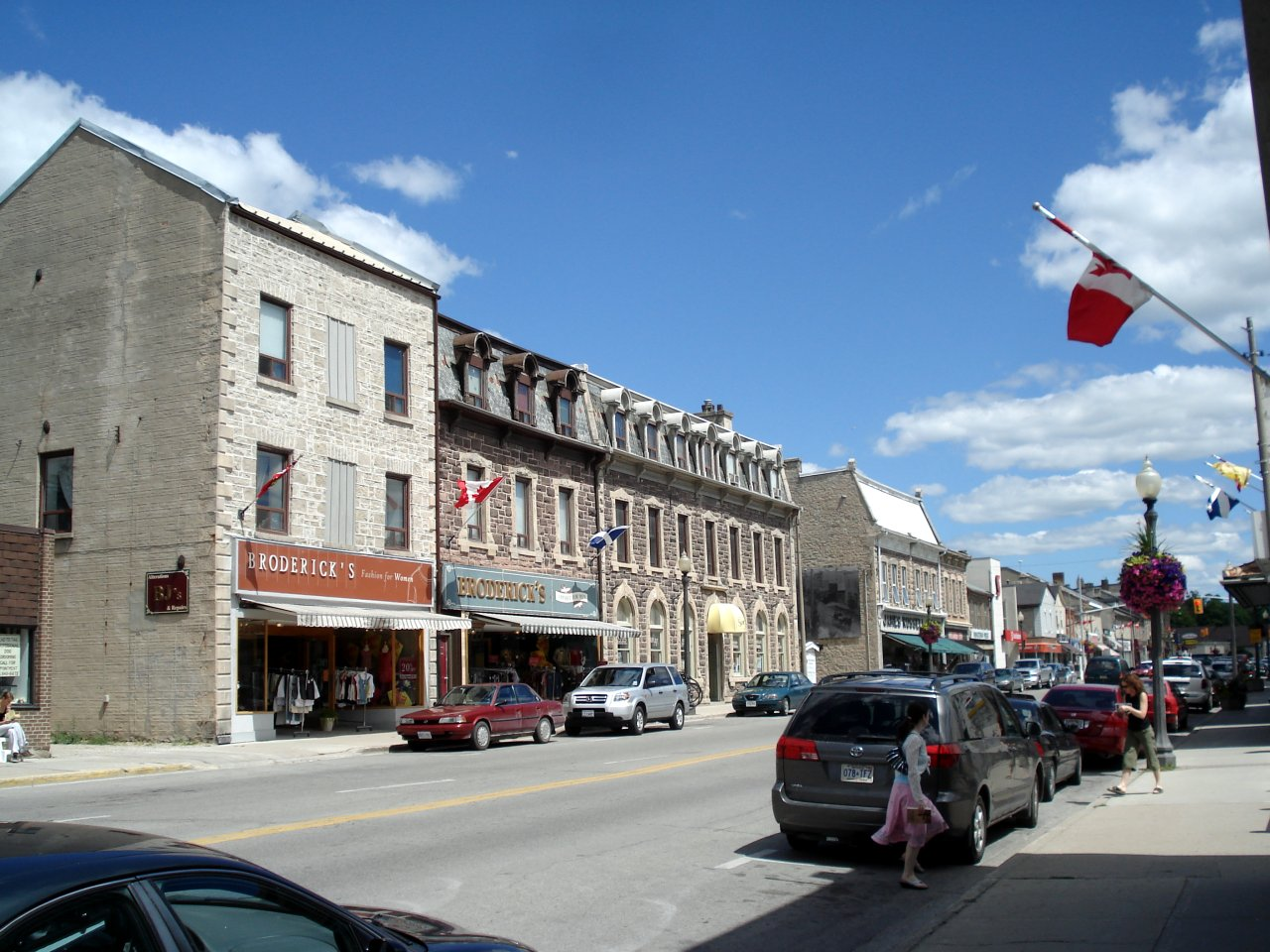
Fergus, Ontario

Frank Forest Sargent was born on July 6, 1902, in Fergus, Ontario. His father Lewis was a livery yard keeper, and his mother was Matilda Sargent (née Alexander). He grew up in a family of three children, with a sister Ruby and a brother Arthur. Sargent began curling in Fergus at age 12 with his father. He participated in his first bonspiel at age 14 in Hamilton. He also played lacrosse in Fergus as a youth, and played junior ice hockey for Guelph in the Ontario Hockey Association.

Sargent played senior lacrosse in Orangeville, and won two Ontario titles, and one national title. (Note: The Northwestern Ontario Sports Hall of Fame inductee information file on Sargent notes that the lacrosse championships are undocumented, and does not mention either the Mann Cup or Minto Cup.) He later played lacrosse in Hamilton, and was roommates with future professional hockey players Hap Day and Carson Cooper. While playing for Hamilton, Sargent body checked against Lionel Conacher who then fell across Sargent's legs. Sargent spent four weeks in the hospital recovering from the injury which shortened his career for contact sports. He later lived in Renfrew, Ontario, then moved to Port Arthur in 1923, and played one season of intermediate level senior ice hockey.

== Business career ==
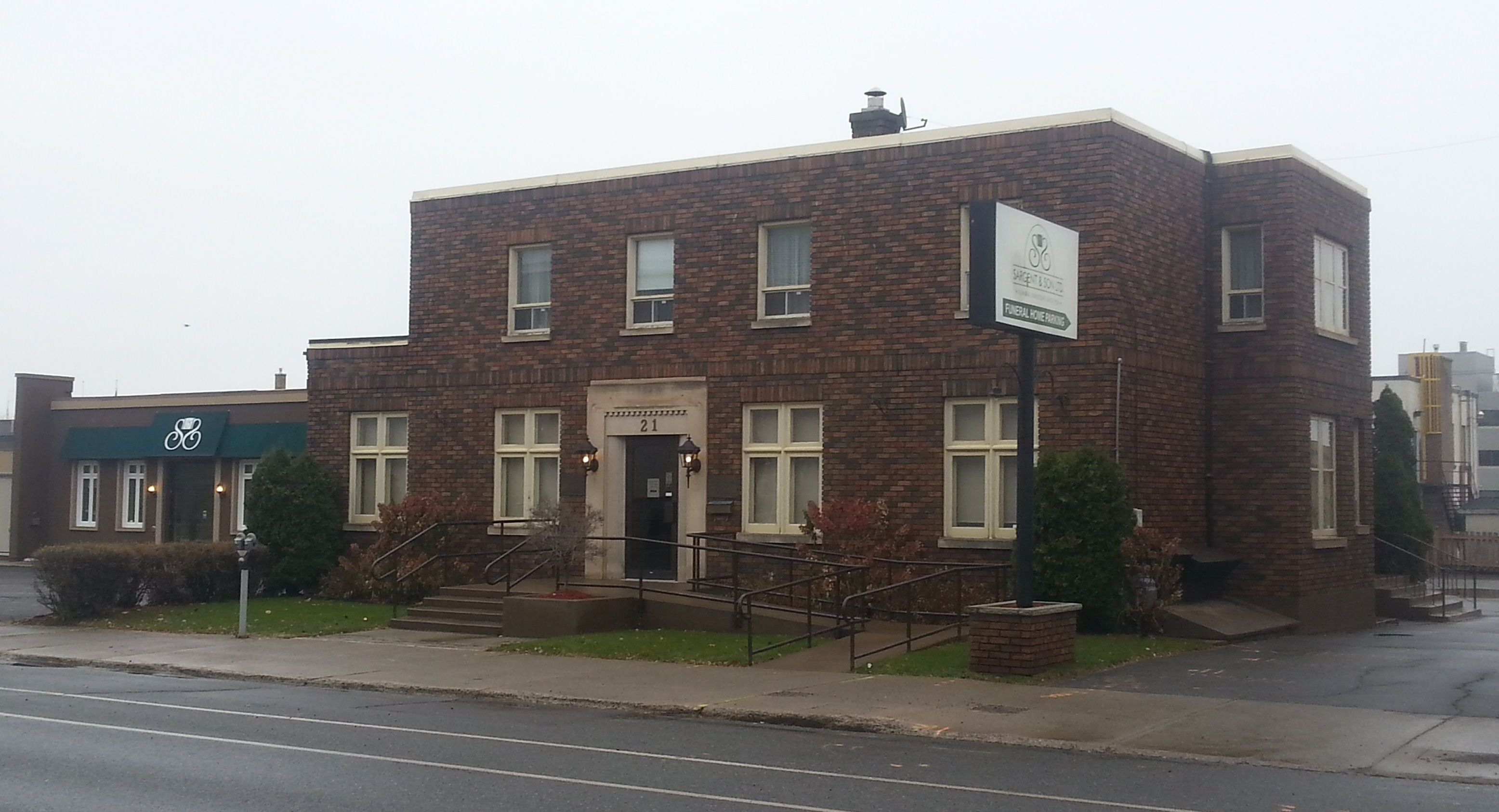
Sargent and Sons funeral home

In 1923, Sargent began working for Thompson and Sargent, a funeral home co-founded by his father Lewis Sargent. Sargent apprenticed in Winnipeg with Clarke-Leatherdale, then graduated from the Canadian School of Embalming with honours in 1926, to become a funeral director. Lewis Sargent bought out his partner, then Frank Sargent assumed management of the family's funeral home business when it was renamed Sargent and Son. He became a member of the Ontario Funeral Service Association and the Northwestern Ontario Funeral Service Association, then took over the family business upon his father's death in 1946.

== Hockey career ==
=== Early involvement ===
Sargent led a group of five investors in 1928, who sought a junior hockey team based in Port Arthur to compete for the Memorial Cup. The Thunder Bay Amateur Hockey Association (TBAHA) feared that the plan to group the best players on one team would weaken the local junior league and did not approve the endeavour. Sargent was subsequently elected to the TBAHA executive in 1929, and served continuously until 1955. He was vice-president of the TBAHA from 1935 to 1936, and president from 1936 to 1938. He oversaw the Thunder Bay District Senior Hockey League which had four teams in Canada, and also played games against teams from Minnesota. He coordinated Allan Cup playoffs for the Canadian teams. He gave approval for the Kenora Thistles to continue playing as a senior team under the Manitoba Amateur Hockey Association umbrella instead of the TBAHA, since they had done so as a junior team.

=== CAHA second vice-president ===
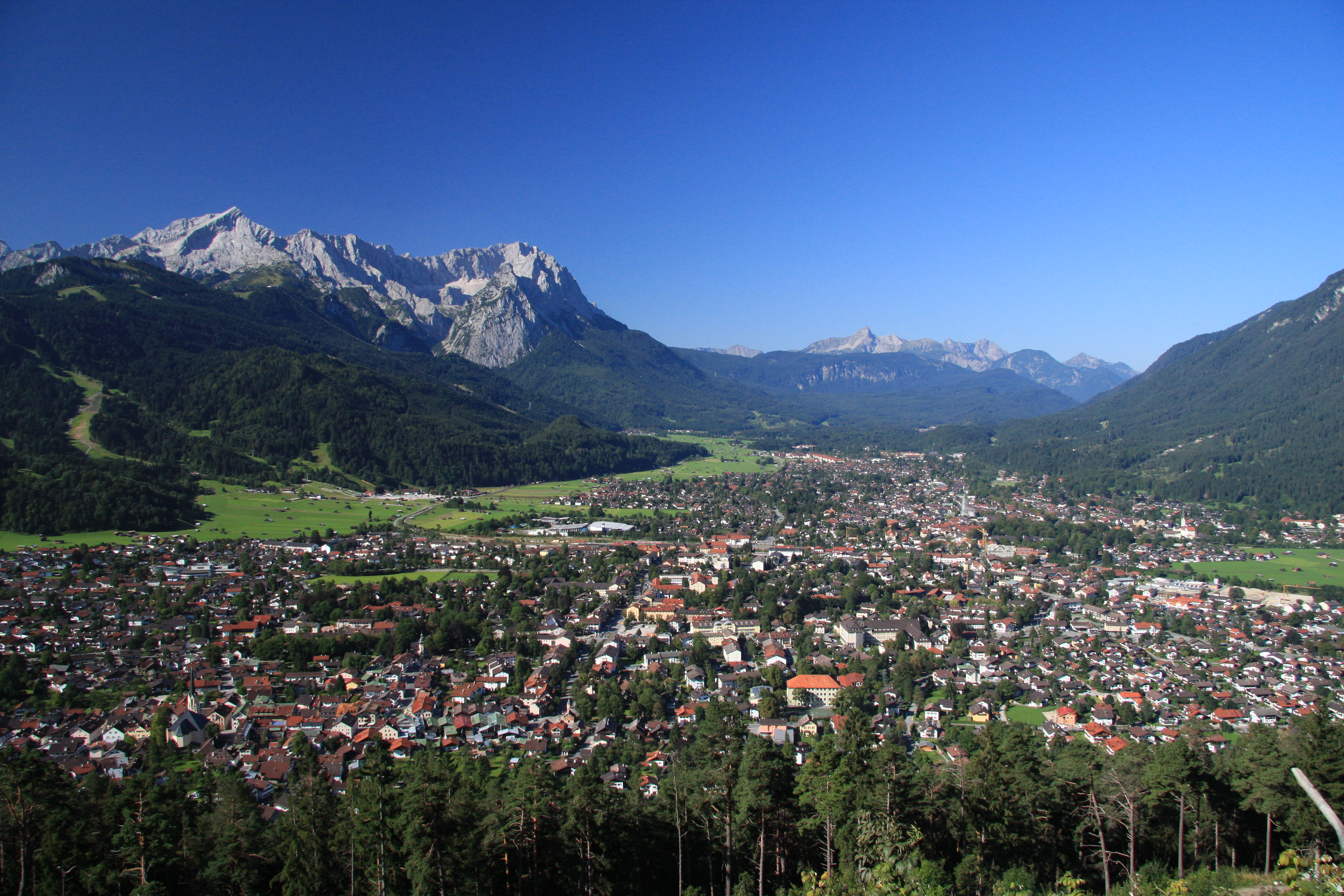
Sargent was scheduled to attend the 1940 Winter Olympics hosted in Garmisch-Partenkirchen (pictured), prior to the outbreak of World War II.

Sargent was elected second vice-president of the Canadian Amateur Hockey Association (CAHA) on April 18, 1938. He became a member of the CAHA rules committee. He also served on the CAHA committee to negotiate professional-amateur agreements with the National Hockey League (NHL) from 1938 to 1955, along with W. G. Hardy and George Dudley. In August 1938, the CAHA and the NHL reached a new working agreement. Stipulations included the recognition each other's suspensions, use of the same playing rules, the NHL would not sign players without CAHA consent during the season, and the CAHA would deny international transfers to amateurs who were on reserve lists for NHL teams. Sargent accompanied the Port Arthur Bearcats to the 1939 Allan Cup championship, which they won versus the Montreal Royals in four games.

Sargent was re-elected second vice-president on April 12, 1939. The Port Arthur Bearcats were chosen to represent the Canada men's national ice hockey team at the 1940 Winter Olympics, and Sargent was placed in charge of the upcoming tour of Europe and was expected to travel with the team. The CAHA approved C$5,000 towards travel expenses overseen by Sargent, and the team would receive any profits from exhibition games played while in Europe. The Bearcats requested a guarantee from the CAHA against financial loss, and Sargent expected a meeting to decide on the travel demands. The 1940 Winter Olympics were ultimately cancelled after the German invasion of Poland in September 1939.

=== CAHA first vice-president ===
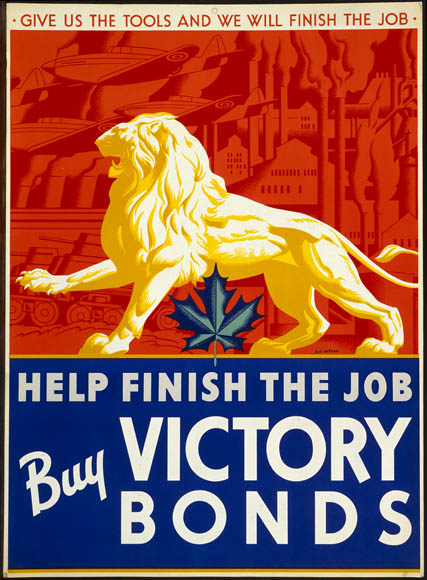
Sargent supported the purchase of victory bonds to assist the Canadian war effort. The CAHA bought $20,000 in bonds and donated another $5,000 to the Government of Canada while he was on the executive.

Sargent was elected first vice-president of the CAHA general meeting on April 17, 1940. At the same meeting, the CAHA updated its constitution to define an amateur as "one who either has not engaged or is not engaged in organized professional hockey", and permitted its teams to sign players to binding contracts. The CAHA and the Amateur Hockey Association of the United States (AHAUS) agreed to an alliance and formed the International Ice Hockey Association to govern international hockey relationships. Sargent explained that in the new definition of amateur, the CAHA was only concerned whether a player was a professional in hockey, and not in any other sport. At the same time, the CAHA declined an invitation to re-affiliate with the Amateur Athletic Union of Canada due to differences in what constitutes an amateur.

The CAHA reached a new agreement with the NHL in November 1940, which included payments to junior or senior clubs for developing players signed by professional teams. Sargent and W. G. Hardy became responsible to distribute the money proportionate to the player's service time. The new agreement also stipulated that players and teams would be suspended for improper transfers, and gave Sargent an $800 honorarium to cover expenses as an executive. Sargent oversaw schedules for playoffs in Western Canada, and stated that schedules might be altered to generate more attendance and profit.

Sargent was re-elected first vice-president of the CAHA on April 16, 1941. He stated that the CAHA would take measures to ensure faster and cleaner hockey, and that proposals would be forthcoming at the upcoming meeting with the NHL to eliminate high-sticking, boarding and body checking injuries. He was subsequently named chairman of the resolution committee for the next CAHA general meeting.

The CAHA adopted new rules in 1941, to assist in finding replacement players during wartime conditions; and sought for temporary reinstatement of professionals as amateurs, who were unable to travel to the United States during the war. Sargent was committed to do everything possible to expedite in reinstating professionals as amateurs under CAHA jurisdiction.

=== CAHA president ===
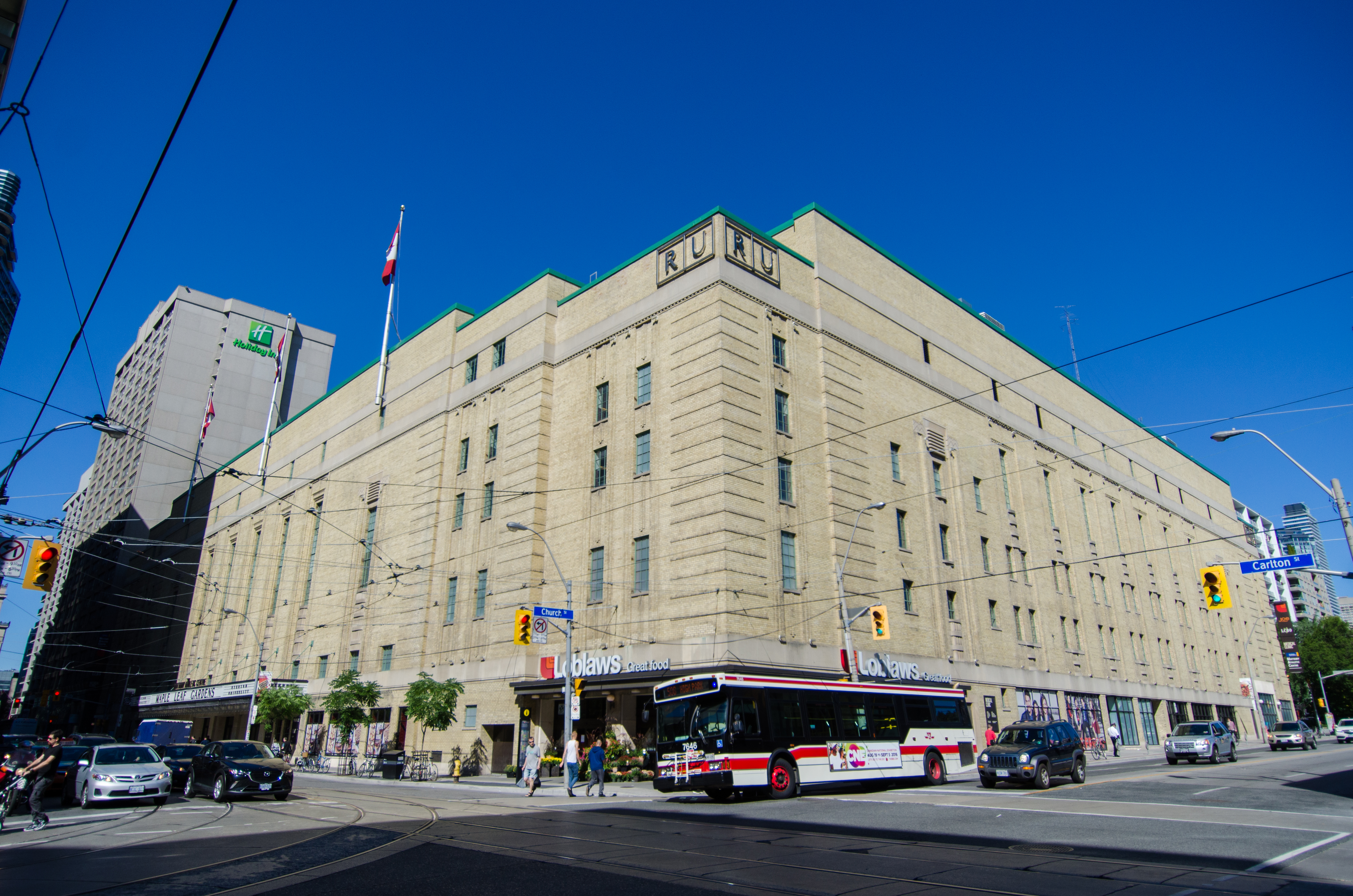
Sargent chose to host the Memorial Cup final in Maple Leaf Gardens each year while he was president, to generate the greatest profits to reinvest into the CAHA.

==== First term ====
Sargent was elected president of the CAHA on April 21, 1942, to succeed George Dudley. He announced that the CAHA had profited nearly $15,000 from the 1942 playoffs, which he distributed to teams based on games played. The CAHA generated most of its playoffs profit from the 1942 Memorial Cup, more than three times the profit compared to the 1942 Allan Cup. The CAHA also approved grants to each of its provincial branches for the development of minor ice hockey, and agreed to distribute funds according to a survey of minor ice hockey organizations completed by W. B. George of the Ottawa District Hockey Association. The CAHA later allocated $9,000 towards promotion of minor ice hockey.

In August 1942, the CAHA was requested to submit a brief to military service selection officials with the Government of Canada, to summarize the current participation numbers and its future plans. Sargent issued instructions to teams in the CAHA to arrange for games not interfere with the war economy, and accommodations must be made for any players who also worked at jobs contributing towards the war effort. He reported that registrations dropped from 26,000 in 1939, to just 13,000 in 1942, and he expected to lose more players to military services. Despite declining registration, he felt that prospects across the CAHA looked bright and was committed to have hockey to continue for the morale of Canadians.

The CAHA and the NHL agreed in principle that a junior-aged player could become a professional whenever he wanted, to make a living under wartime conditions. They expected that NHL clubs would rely on junior-aged players as replacements due to military enlistments. In October 1942, Sargent announced a new professional-amateur agreement was reached. NHL teams were permitted to sign junior-aged players if the junior club was contacted first, and agreed not to sign any other junior-eligible players who had not yet played for the CAHA. The NHL continued to pay the CAHA for developing players, and contributed $17,000 towards junior teams during the 1941–42 season, compared to $6,000 during the 1940–41 season.

During the playoffs for the 1942–43 season, Sargent sought for more strict enforcement of rules by referees in the interest of player safety. He was particularly concerned with increasing trend of rough play as opposed to "good clean hockey".

==== Second term ====
The Memorial Cup (pictured) was the championship trophy for junior ice hockey in Canada.

Sargent was re-elected president of the CAHA on April 27, 1943. He stated that his first term as president had been the most financially successful for the CAHA to date, with a profit near $60,000 and the ability to put $10,500 towards minor hockey grants. He chose to host the 1943 Memorial Cup in Toronto instead of Winnipeg to maximize profits. Attendance in Winnipeg had shrunk during the war, but remained strong in Toronto.

Sargent recommended increasing the maximum roster size from 12 to 13 players due to the war. He later announced restrictions on transfers for minors and junior-aged players between regions in Canada. The CAHA registration committee wanted to protect against a region losing to many players, but chose to make exceptions when the player continued to reside with his parents who relocated or for a student living away from home and attending a post-secondary institution.

In April 1943, the CAHA implemented rules to prevent delays of game to fix equipment, and a penalty shot if a goaltender injured or attempted to injure an opposing player. The CAHA also approved a recommendation for a centre ice red line which would allow forward passes to open up the play, instead of the existing offside rule. In August 1943, the joint rules committee of the CAHA and NHL adopted the forward pass to the centre ice red line.

Sargent and Dudley met with officers from the Canadian Army in June 1943, to discuss possible arrangements for military sports in the CAHA. Canadian Army and Royal Canadian Air Force (RCAF) teams agreed to join CAHA leagues for the 1943–44 season, provided that schedules did not interfere with military service. Playoffs were shortened to two rounds or less due to time restrictions. Sargent advised CAHA teams that a junior-aged player who enlisted would be required to return to his previous club after completing military service. RCAF teams pulled out of hockey on January 6, 1944, due to military commitments. Sargent did not question the decision and wished to co-operate with the war effort. Canadian Army teams later withdrew from CAHA national playoffs, but were permitted to play in local and intramural sports leagues with other garrisons. Several leagues in Canada folded as a result, and other leagues withdrew from the upcoming 1943 Allan Cup playoffs. The CAHA later allowed teams to have four replacements in playoffs due to wartime enlistments, in addition to the normal four players added for reinforcement of teams.

Sargent attended a meeting between the CAHA and the NHL in September 1943, and accepted a proposal from a group in Kingston, Ontario, to establish a Hockey Hall of Fame. In February 1944, he was named to selection committee to choose the inaugural group of inductees for the Hall of Fame.

==== Third term ====
The Allan Cup (pictured) was the championship trophy for amateur senior ice hockey in Canada.

Sargent was re-elected to a third term as president of the CAHA on April 13, 1944, and became the first person to be elected to more than two terms as president. He supported rule changes to promote on-ice safety and prevent injuries within and near the goal crease and players' benches, and planned to publish a common book of rules in co-operation with the NHL. In April 1944, the CAHA voted to sever relations with the Ligue Internationale de Hockey sur Glace (LIHG), and reaffirmed its relationship within the International Ice Hockey Association to strengthen ties with the AHAUS and the British Ice Hockey Association.

Sargent hoped for the return of military teams to CAHA competitions for the 1944–45 season, but no applications were received. Despite the wartime conditions, registration had increased from 17,167 during the 1942–43 season, to 27,271 players in the 1943–44 season. The CAHA used the growing profits to increase grants by $1,500 to promote minor ice hockey.

The CAHA gave approval for a new international senior hockey league to include teams in British Columbia, Washington and Oregon. The league was organized by Al Leader, who wanted to rebuild amateur hockey which had suffered from the collapse of military teams. The Pacific Coast Hockey League began operating in the 1944–45 season, and Sargent received complaints about junior-aged players being offered contracts. He sought to follow proper international transfers to limit the number of junior-aged players leaving Canada; and for an AHAUS decision on its affiliation, professional status and whether the existing professional-amateur agreement applied.

The CAHA was also faced with limited growth prospects of junior hockey in Western Canada due to the number of rinks available and not enough ice time. Sargent wanted to stop the migration of junior-aged players to Eastern Canada, and maintain registration numbers and competition in Western Canada. He decreed that such transfer requests must include a valid reason besides hockey. He cautioned that the western branches of the CAHA would be fighting to have the clause removed from the constitution which allowed exemptions for preparatory school transfers. He also announced the 1945 Memorial Cup would return to Maple Leaf Gardens to maximize profit for the CAHA.

Sargent proposed hosting the 1945 Allan Cup in Vancouver. In February 1945, he questioned the viability of inter-provincial playoffs for senior hockey in 1945. While there was ample support for senior hockey in Vancouver, he was concerned about the reluctance teams from Quebec to travel west for the Allan Cup during wartime conditions. The Montreal Royals and Valleyfield Braves who appeared to be the strongest teams in Eastern Canada, and both declined to travel across the country due to their players' need to make a living rather than play hockey. In February 1945, Sargent announced the cancellation of the 1945 Allan Cup playoffs. It was the first season in which the trophy was not contested since the inaugural 1909 Allan Cup. The CAHA later vetoed an offer by the Quebec Aces to defend their 1944 Allan Cup championship against a challenger. Sargent did not want to see weaker teams challenge for the Allan Cup in lieu of a proper national playoff.

=== CAHA past-president ===
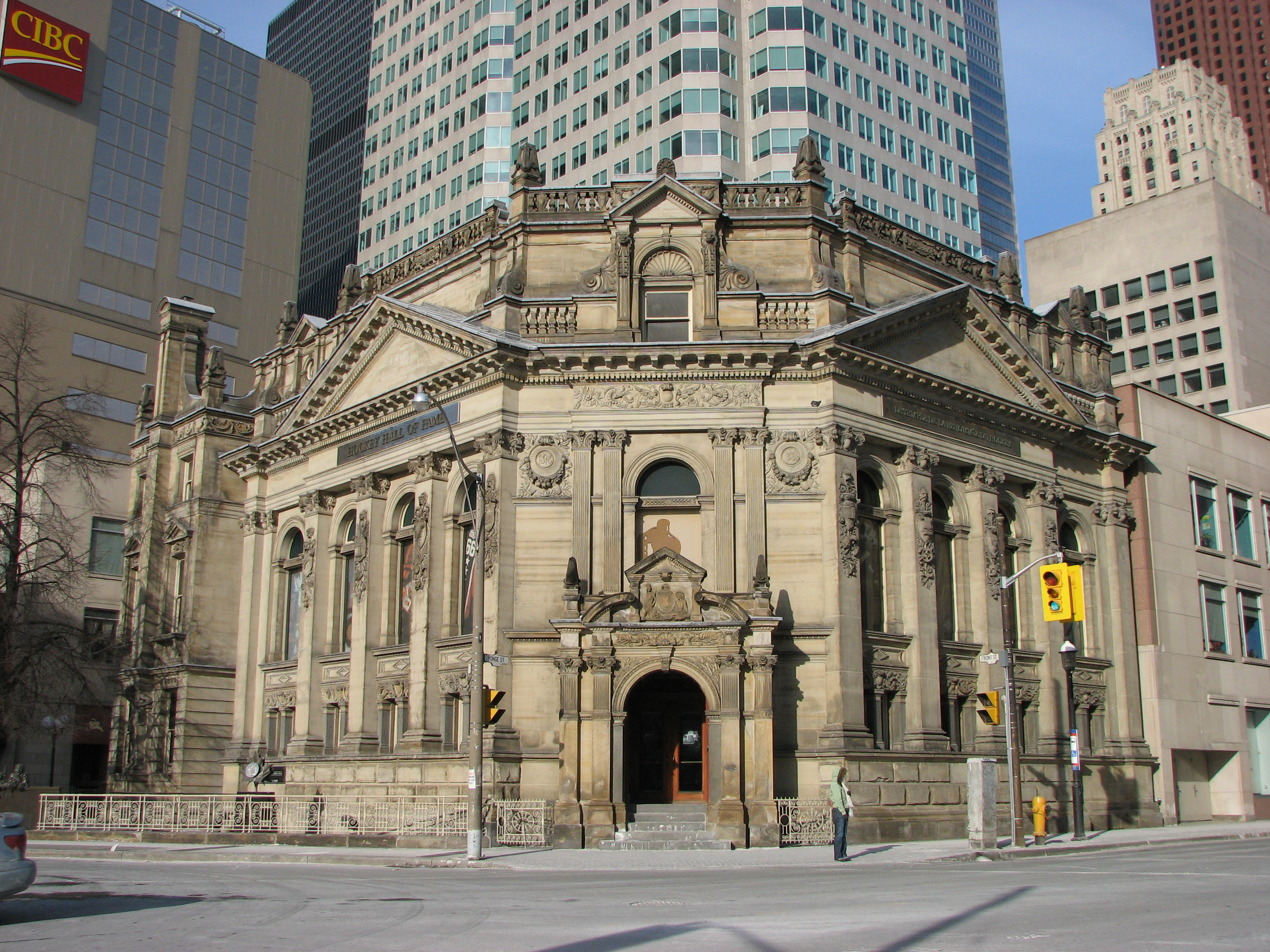
In 1945, Sargent sat on the selection committee for the inaugural group of inductees into the Hockey Hall of Fame (pictured).

Sargent was succeeded as president by Hanson Dowell, then served as past-president of the CAHA from 1945 to 1947. Sargent stated he was relieved to let another person take over as president, since the duties were getting too much to handle as a volunteer. He felt that a full-time position would be necessary soon, but anticipated he would remain heavily involved as past-president.

Sargent was immediately elected second vice-president of the International Ice Hockey Association, and was part of the CAHA delegation to discuss international hockey relations. He felt that Canada might be excluded from ice hockey at the 1948 Winter Olympics if the International Olympic Committee did not accept the new Canadian definition of amateur, updated since the last Winter Olympics in 1936.

Sargent supervised the Western Canada junior and senior playoffs, and believed that Maple Leaf Gardens should be the permanent home of the Memorial Cup finals, with arrangements made to compensate Western teams for travelling east.

Sargent helped negotiate a new professional-amateur deal in 1946, where the NHL offered a $20,000 flat fee to sign junior-aged players. He noted that relations with the NHL had been friendly over the years, but the CAHA sought a larger lump sum or amount per player. After a stalemate, the CAHA ultimately accepted the $20,000 lump sum payment.

=== Later involvement ===
Sargent returned to his previous role as vice-president of the TBAHA from 1947 to 1951, and served as its president again from 1951 to 1953. During his involvement, he sought to establish a local senior ice hockey league involving teams from Winnipeg, and saw the Fort William Gardens open in 1951 to host games in the Thunder Bay Senior Hockey League.

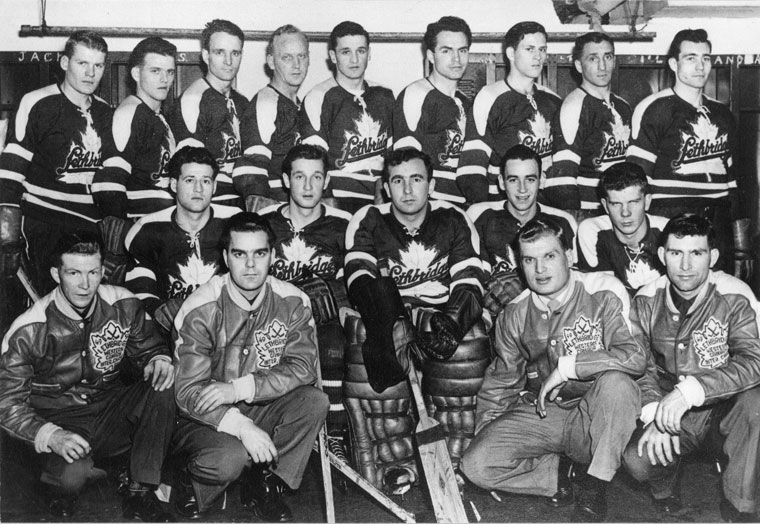
1951 Lethbridge Maple Leafs

Sargent supported the practice of allowing less populated districts in the CAHA to add players from other teams for the playoffs, to make them more competitive. After the Port Arthur Bruins from the TBAHA won the 1948 Memorial Cup, the more populated Ontario and Manitoba associations wanted to reverse the practice. In a 1950 Memorial Cup playoff series between the Kenora Kinsmen and the Port Arthur Bruins, Sargent awarded the series to Port Arthur after the first two games were won by 10–3 and 12–0 scores. In 1952, Sargent helped negotiate an agreement with the NHL for call-ups to be made to professional teams, but not interfere with playoffs in the CAHA. A January 15 deadline was agreed to, unless there was an emergency due to injuries.

Sargent represented the CAHA at 1951 general meeting of the IIHF in Paris, and accompanied the Lethbridge Maple Leafs on their European tour and victory at the 1951 Ice Hockey World Championships. He felt the Lethbridge Maple Leafs were the best goodwill ambassadors the Canada could have had, describing them as gentlemanly and well-behaved. Also in 1951, he advised the Finnish Ice Hockey Association of Port Arthur native Joe Wirkkunen, who spoke Finnish and could assist as an instructor to expand hockey in Finland.

Sargent retired from hockey and resigned from the TBAHA on September 12, 1955, after 27 years on the executive. He expressed a growing dislike for the physical style of hockey being played, and had hoped to reintroduce rules for less contact and to prevent injuries. He also felt that the rising cost of operating a junior team, had decreased the number of teams which could compete at a high level.

== Curling career ==
=== Early involvement ===
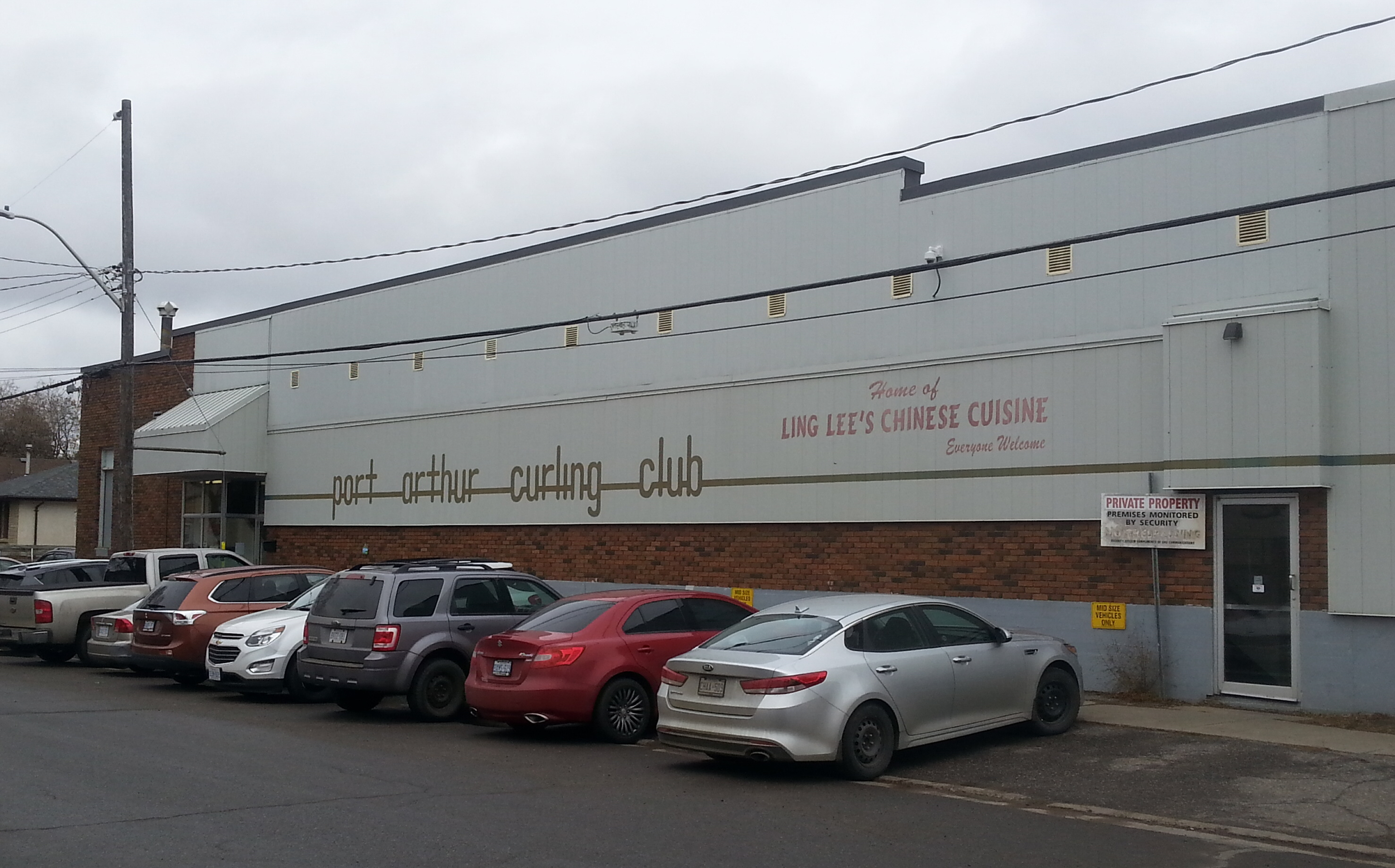
Port Arthur Curling Club

Sargent was a member of the Port Arthur Curling Club from 1924 onwards, and served as the club's president from 1934 to 1936. Membership grew to more than 30 curling rinks during this time, and he led discussions for the club to become affiliated with the Manitoba Curling Association (MCA).

Sargent travelled to Manitoba representing his club, and participated in at least five MCA Bonspiels. He was a member of the rink which won the doubles championship at the Winnipeg Bonspiel in 1936, and won the Port Arthur Curling Club championship five times. He also won the Royal York Trophy at the 1946 bonspiel in Toronto. He won the annual 1947 and 1948 Lakehead Bonspiels with an undefeated record in both events.

=== Northwestern Ontario curling ===
Sargent assisted in founding the Northwestern Ontario Curling Association (NWOCA) in 1946. He was elected its first president in November the same year, and sought recognition as its own branch equivalent to other provincial associations within the Dominion Curling Association (DCA), and to compete for The Brier as national champions. The DCA granted branch status in 1949, and Ontario became the only province in Canada to have more than one nationally recognized branch. He was re-elected president of the NWOCA in February 1949, and was named to the executive committee of the DCA.

Sargent won the 1950 NWOCA playoffs with eight consecutive victories, and advanced to the Northern Ontario finals in Sudbury. He was skip of the Northwest Ontario rink which lost to the Tom Ramsay rink that went on to win the 1950 Macdonald Brier. Sargent played second on the rink skipped by Grant Watson which won the 1953 Northern Ontario Men's Provincial Curling Championship. It was the first rink to represent Northwestern Ontario at the Brier. They competed at the 1953 Macdonald Brier in Sudbury with a record of seven wins, three losses, and finished in a tie for third place.

Sargent served as president of the Port Arthur Curling Club again from 1950 to 1955, and led the club's effort to install the first indoor artificial curling sheet in the Lakehead area. Construction was funded by a combination of loans and profits generated by the club itself, which were $7,100 in the 1950–51 season. He later assisted in co-ordinating hosting duties of the 1960 Macdonald Brier by the Port Arthur and Fort William curling clubs.

=== Dominion Curling Association ===
Sargent was elected third vice-president of the DCA in March 1962, which enacted residency rules for its curlers in the Brier to prevent teams switching associations in its playoffs. He was elected second vice-president of the DCA in March 1963. He sat on the committee to review recommendations to update the code of ethics for professionalism in curling. The amateur eligibility issues had been unresolved since 1959, and opinions varied between Eastern and Western Canada. He began efforts to establish a national championship for mixed curling which was popular in Eastern Canada, but Western Canada showed little interest due to lack of ice time.

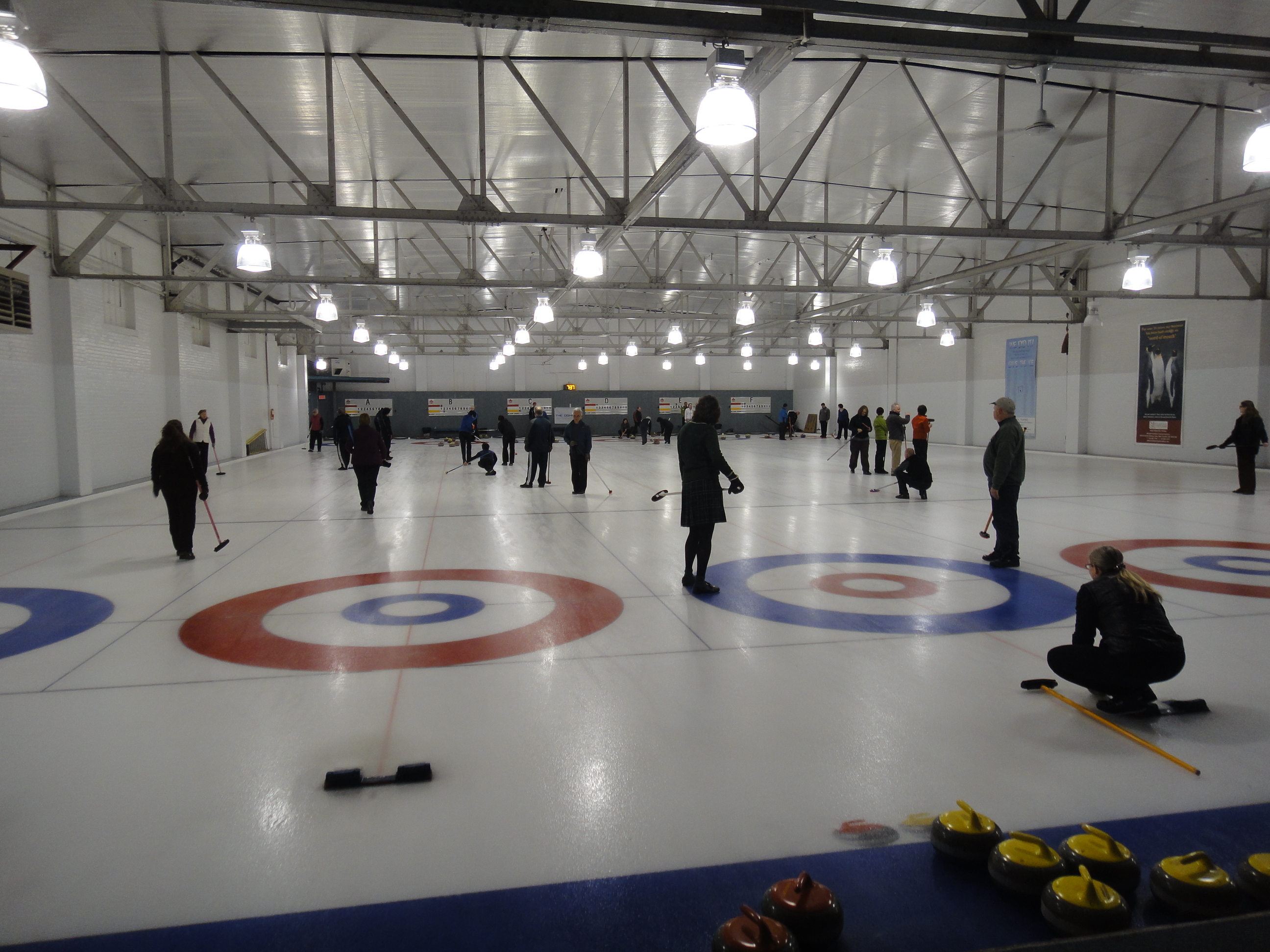
Mixed recreational action at the Royal Canadian Curling Club

Sargent was elected first vice-president of the DCA in March 1964. The Canadian Mixed Curling Championship was established the same year at the Royal Canadian Curling Club in Toronto, with Canadian Breweries as the event's sponsor and Sargent as its committee chairman. Proposed updates to the code of ethics were rejected by the DCA in 1964. Western Canada delegates felt the proposed restrictions would have prevented the best curlers in the country from participating in DCA events, and put Canada at a disadvantage against other countries. Proposals limited the top bonspiel prize to $800 per rink or $200 per curler, which would have allowed only the independently wealthy to take time off and travel to the national events. The Canadian Senior Curling Championships was established in October 1964. Sargent was an original member of the senior championship committee, and believed the event would attract former Brier competitors and give seniors place to compete which had not existed.

Sargent was elected president of the DCA in March 1965, at the general meeting held at the Bessborough Hotel in Saskatoon. He became the only person to hold the positions of CAHA and DCA president, and the first person to be president of two national amateur sporting associations in Canada. The inaugural Canadian Seniors Curling Championship was hosted in Port Arthur in March 1965. It used a minimum age of 55 for competitors, and had the Seagram Company as its title sponsor.

Sargent was succeeded as president by Gordon Lockhart Bennett in March 1966. Sargent remained chairman of the national mixed curling championships. In 1969, he revealed that a new sponsor was needed since Canadian Breweries would pull out after the 1970 event, and was concerned about the event's viability without financial assistance. In March 1973, Sargent sat on the nomination committee to select the first group of inductees into the Canadian Curling Hall of Fame to be established in Winnipeg.

== Personal life ==
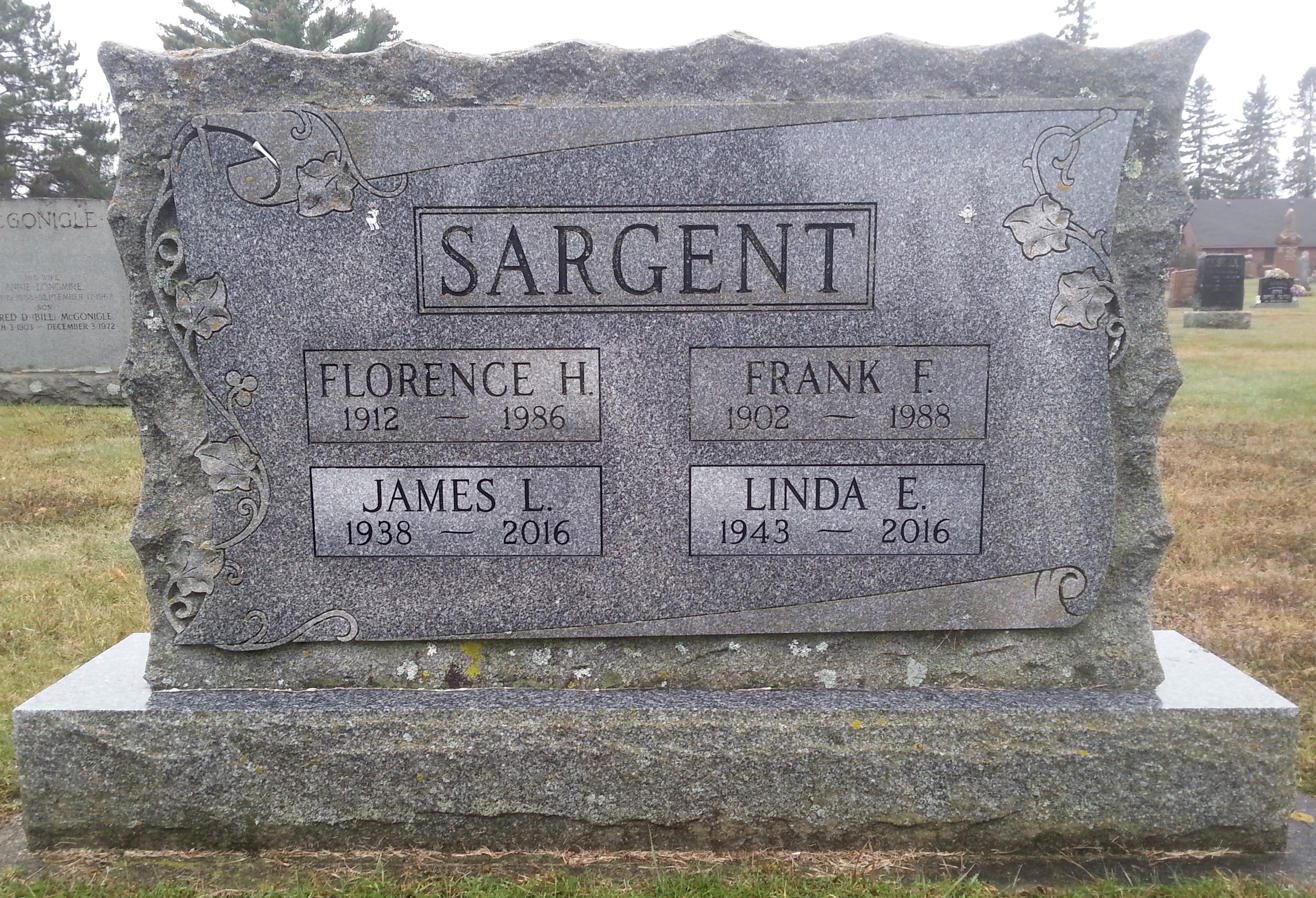
Sargent family gravestone at Riverside Cemetery

Sargent married Florence Helena Jones on September 25, 1935, and they resided in Port Arthur. The couple later raised two sons and one daughter. He was a member of the Loon Lake Campers' Association, and participated in local service clubs. He was a member the Gyro International Club of Port Arthur, and the Port Arthur Lodge of the Independent Order of Odd Fellows. He was a Freemason in the Scottish Rite Thunder Bay Lodge A.F. and A.M., and was a member of the Shriners as part of the Khartum Temple of the Shrine.

Sargent served as president of the Port Arthur Golf Club from 1939 to 1941, and was a member of the Portage la Prairie Country Club. He won the Port Arthur Country Club championship three times, won the Thunder Bay District championship once, and was twice a runner-up in the district. He played badminton in Northwestern Ontario regional competitions. He won the men's championship twice, the men's doubles championship twice, and the mixed championship three times. He also participated in and won local horseshoes tournaments. His other hobbies included waterfowl hunting and skeet shooting.

Sargent's wife Florence died on September 10, 1986. Sargent died on September 28, 1988, at his residence in Port Arthur. He was interred in the family plot at Riverside Cemetery in Thunder Bay. His son James subsequently assumed leadership of the family's funeral business.

== Honours and awards ==
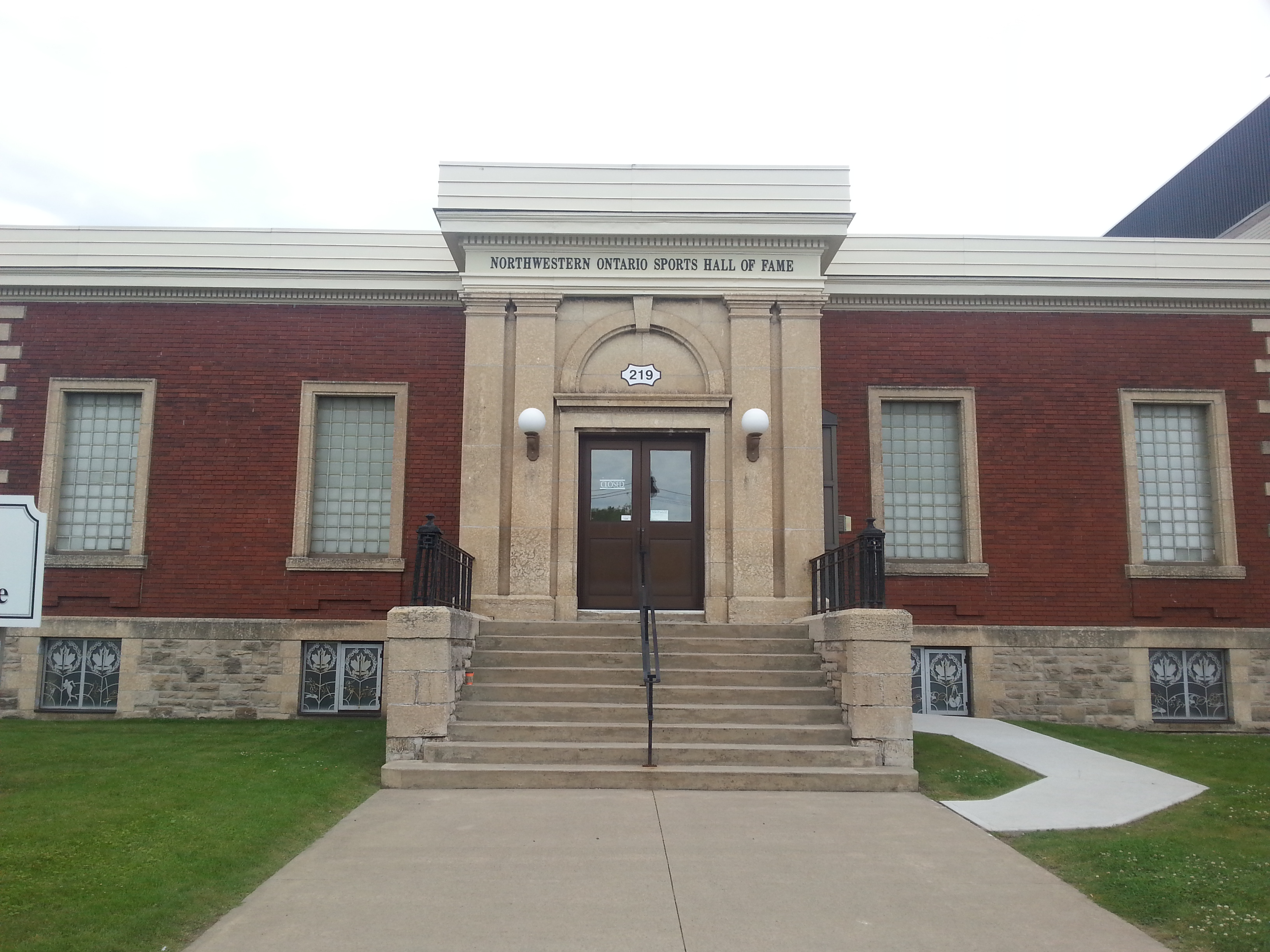
Northwestern Ontario Sports Hall of Fame in Thunder Bay

Sargent received awards and citations from multiple organizations. He was given a silver platter from the Port Arthur Town Council in 1947, in recognition of his service to the CAHA. In 1950, he received the AHAUS citation award for contributions to ice hockey in the United States. He received the Ontario Hockey Association Gold Stick Award in 1953, for contributions to ice hockey in Ontario. For his work at the national level, he was given the CAHA Order of Merit in May 1963, and was made a recipient of the Canadian Centennial Medal in 1967. In 1976, he was given the Curling Grand Prix honour award, and was appointed member of the Governor General's Curling Club. He also received the Queen Elizabeth II Silver Jubilee Medal in 1977, for significant contributions to Canada.

Sargent was made the namesake of the Frank Sargent trophy by the TBAHA, awarded to the scoring champion of the Lakehead Junior Hockey League. Other honours include the Gyro International Club of Port Arthur appreciation award, the Hockey Hall of Fame meritorious award, and being named an honorary president of the Manitoba Amateur Hockey Association.

Life memberships were given to Sargent by multiple organizations. He was elected a life member of the CAHA on May 3, 1946. After retiring from hockey, he received a life membership from the TBAHA on September 12, 1955. The Royal Canadian Legion Branch #5 in Port Arthur made him a life member in 1957. After his term as president of the Dominion Curling Association ended, he received a lifetime membership from the Ontario Curling Association in 1966, the Port Arthur Curling Club in 1966, the Manitoba Curling Association in 1966, the Dominion Curling Association in 1967, and the Quebec Curling Association in 1967. Other lifetime memberships include the Fergus Curling Club, the Fort William Curling and Athletic Club, and the Northwestern Ontario Curling Association.

Sargent was inducted into the Canadian Curling Hall of Fame in 1974, as a past president in the builder category. He was inducted into the Northwestern Ontario Sports Hall of Fame on September 25, 1982.
