= 1950 Macdonald Brier =

Canadian men's curling championship

- Host city: Vancouver, British Columbia
- Arena: Kerrisdale Arena
- Dates: March 6–10
- Attendance: 25,000
- Winner: Northern Ontario
- Curling club: Kirland Lake CC, Kirkland Lake
- Skip: Tom Ramsay
- Third: Len Williamson
- Second: Bill Weston
- Lead: Bill Kenny

The 1950 Macdonald Brier, the Canadian men's national curling championship, was held from March 6 to 10, 1950 at Kerrisdale Arena in Vancouver, British Columbia. A total of 25,000 fans attended the event.

Team Northern Ontario, skipped by Tom Ramsay, won the Brier Tankard with a round robin record of 7-2. This was Northern Ontario's first Brier championship.

Alberta, Manitoba, and Ontario all tied for second with 6-3 records, necessitating a tiebreaker playoff between the three teams for runner-up. Manitoba would ultimately be the runner-up as they defeated Ontario 13-8 in the second tiebreaker game. Ontario defeated Alberta 7-5 in the first tiebreaker game.

== Event Summary ==
Heading into the final day of the Brier, Northern Ontario and Ontario were the front runners to win the Brier with 5-1 records. Alberta and Quebec one game behind at 4-2 while British Columbia, Manitoba, and Nova Scotia still in the mix at 3-3.

In the Thursday morning session, Northern Ontario defeated British Columbia 6-5, thus eliminating all the three loss teams from Brier championship contention. Manitoba stomped Alberta 15-6, also eliminating Alberta from championship contention while Quebec beat Ontario 13-8. This left Northern Ontario, Ontario, and Quebec in contention for the championship.

Northern Ontario would clinch the Brier Tankard in the afternoon session on Thursday with a 14-1 victory over Nova Scotia. In the remaining Thursday afternoon games, BC would defeat Quebec 8-7, Alberta defeated Ontario 11-7, and Manitoba beat Prince Edward Island 16-9. Even though the championship was already decided, this did not mean that this edition of the Brier would end anticlimactically in the Thursday evening session as there was a possibility of a five-way playoff for second place between Alberta, BC, Manitoba, Nova Scotia, Ontario, and Quebec.

In the final round robin session on Thursday evening, Alberta would beat Nova Scotia 11-10 clinching them at least a spot in the playoff and eliminating BC in the process. Quebec's 16-2 loss to Saskatchewan meant that Quebec was no longer a possibility for the playoff. With Ontario demolishing New Brunswick 20-4 and Manitoba edging Brier champion Northern Ontario 8-7, this meant that Alberta, Manitoba, and Ontario would decide who would finish runner-up. The first tiebreaker would be played late Thursday night into Friday morning while the second tiebreaker would be played Friday morning.

In the second place tiebreaker playoff, Manitoba would draw the bye meaning that Alberta and Ontario would play in the first tiebreaker with the winning facing Manitoba in the second tiebreaker. In the first tiebreaker, Alberta held a 5-2 lead after eight ends, but Ontario would score five in the next four ends to win 7-5. In the second tiebreaker, Manitoba would score four in the first end. Ontario would come back to tie the game at 5 after the fifth end, but Manitoba would score four in the sixth and never look back as they took runner-up over Ontario 13-8.

== Teams ==
The teams are listed as follows:

Alberta	British Columbia	Manitoba	New Brunswick	Northern Ontario
Royal CC, Edmonton Skip: Cliff Manahan; Third: Ross Manahan; Second: Gordon Haynes; Lead: William Bull	Trail CC, Trail Skip: Bung Cartmell; Third: Ty Cobb; Second: Charlie Cook; Lead: Dave Garnham	Elmwood CC, Winnipeg Skip: Bill McTavish; Third: Norm Hume; Second: Gord Lillyman; Lead: Ken Conn	Beaver CC, Moncton Skip: Jimmy Vance; Third: Lee Allanach; Second: Ralph Lister; Lead: Ron Dickie	Kirkland Lake CC, Kirkland Lake Skip: Tom Ramsay; Third: Len Williamson; Second: Bill Weston; Lead: Bill Kenny
Nova Scotia	Ontario	Prince Edward Island	Quebec	Saskatchewan
Bridgewater CC, Bridgewater Skip: Bernard Haines; Third: Eric Joudry; Second: Ralph Simmons; Lead: Lee Rhodenizer	KW Granite CC, Kitchener Skip: Carl Asmussen; Third: Ty Shantz; Second: Cully Schmidt; Lead: Ed Schultz	Charlottetown CC, Charlottetown Skip: Heath Saunders; Third: Doug Saunders; Second: Daniel O'Rourke; Lead: David MacLeod	Victoria CC, Quebec City Skip: Herbie Simons; Third: Thomas Beattie; Second: Bobby Cream; Lead: Andrew Beattie	Prince Albert CC, Prince Albert Skip: Ernie Whitter; Third: Buster Ortloff; Second: Bill Whitter; Lead: John Whitter

== Round-robin standings ==
Key
Brier champion
Teams to tiebreaker playoff

Province	Skip	W	L	PF	PA
Northern Ontario	Tom Ramsay	7	2	93	61
Alberta	Cliff Manahan	6	3	97	86
Manitoba	Billy McTavish	6	3	100	74
Ontario	Carl Asmussen	6	3	102	71
British Columbia	Bung Cartmell	5	4	74	72
Quebec	Herbie Simons	5	4	72	78
Nova Scotia	Bernard Haines	4	5	91	85
Saskatchewan	Ernie Whitter	3	6	83	80
New Brunswick	Jimmy Vance	2	7	79	113
Prince Edward Island	Heath Saunders	1	8	67	138

== Round-robin results ==
All draw times are listed in Pacific Time (UTC−08:00)

=== Draw 1 ===
Monday, March 6 3:00 PM

Sheet A	1	2	3	4	5	6	7	8	9	10	11	12	Final
Quebec (Simons)	0	0	1	0	2	0	3	0	3	1	0	0	10
Manitoba (McTavish)	1	2	0	0	0	1	0	1	0	0	1	2	8

Sheet B	1	2	3	4	5	6	7	8	9	10	11	12	Final
Prince Edward Island (Saunders)	0	1	0	3	2	0	0	0	0	1	0	0	7
New Brunswick (Vance)	4	0	2	0	0	2	2	3	0	0	1	3	17

Sheet C	1	2	3	4	5	6	7	8	9	10	11	12	Final
British Columbia (Cartmell)	1	0	1	2	0	2	0	0	0	3	1	0	10
Nova Scotia (Haines)	0	2	0	0	1	0	0	2	2	0	0	4	11

Sheet D	1	2	3	4	5	6	7	8	9	10	11	12	Final
Alberta (Manahan)	0	1	2	0	1	0	3	3	0	2	0	1	13
Northern Ontario (Ramsay)	2	0	0	5	0	2	0	0	2	0	1	0	12

Sheet E	1	2	3	4	5	6	7	8	9	10	11	12	Final
Ontario (Asmussen)	1	0	1	1	0	2	0	0	1	1	1	1	9
Saskatchewan (Whitter)	0	1	0	0	1	0	2	2	0	0	0	0	6

=== Draw 2 ===
Monday, March 6 8:00 PM

Sheet A	1	2	3	4	5	6	7	8	9	10	11	12	Final
Nova Scotia (Haines)	2	0	3	0	0	6	0	0	5	1	2	0	19
Prince Edward Island (Saunders)	0	2	0	1	1	0	2	1	0	0	0	1	8

Sheet B	1	2	3	4	5	6	7	8	9	10	11	12	Final
Quebec (Simons)	0	0	1	0	2	0	0	2	0	2	0	1	8
Northern Ontario (Ramsay)	0	2	0	1	0	1	3	0	1	0	1	0	9

Sheet C	1	2	3	4	5	6	7	8	9	10	11	12	Final
Manitoba (McTavish)	1	0	0	1	0	0	0	2	0	1	0	3	8
Ontario (Asmussen)	0	2	2	0	2	1	0	0	2	0	2	0	11

Sheet D	1	2	3	4	5	6	7	8	9	10	11	12	13	Final
British Columbia (Cartmell)	0	0	2	0	1	0	0	3	1	0	1	0	1	9
Saskatchewan (Whitter)	0	1	0	1	0	1	1	0	0	1	0	3	0	8

Sheet E	1	2	3	4	5	6	7	8	9	10	11	12	Final
Alberta (Manahan)	2	1	0	5	0	0	1	0	1	2	0	0	12
New Brunswick (Vance)	0	0	3	0	1	1	0	1	0	0	2	1	9

=== Draw 3 ===
Tuesday, March 7 9:30 AM

Sheet A	1	2	3	4	5	6	7	8	9	10	11	12	Final
Saskatchewan (Whitter)	1	1	0	2	1	2	1	0	0	4	0	0	12
Alberta (Manahan)	0	0	2	0	0	0	0	1	0	0	1	1	5

Sheet B	1	2	3	4	5	6	7	8	9	10	11	12	Final
British Columbia (Cartmell)	1	0	2	0	0	0	1	0	3	0	0	0	7
Ontario (Asmussen)	0	1	0	1	1	2	0	2	0	2	1	1	11

Sheet C	1	2	3	4	5	6	7	8	9	10	11	12	Final
New Brunswick (Vance)	0	0	1	1	0	1	0	2	0	0	2	1	8
Northern Ontario (Ramsay)	1	0	0	0	3	0	1	0	3	1	0	0	9

Sheet D	1	2	3	4	5	6	7	8	9	10	11	12	13	Final
Nova Scotia (Haines)	2	0	1	0	1	0	1	0	1	1	0	2	0	9
Manitoba (McTavish)	0	1	0	2	0	1	0	3	0	0	2	0	2	11

Sheet E	1	2	3	4	5	6	7	8	9	10	11	12	13	Final
Quebec (Simons)	0	0	1	0	1	2	0	0	2	2	0	0	0	8
Prince Edward Island (Saunders)	2	1	0	1	0	0	1	1	0	0	1	1	1	9

=== Draw 4 ===
Tuesday, March 7 2:30 PM

Sheet A	1	2	3	4	5	6	7	8	9	10	11	12	Final
British Columbia (Cartmell)	0	1	2	0	3	0	1	1	2	0	4	0	14
New Brunswick (Vance)	2	0	0	1	0	1	0	0	0	3	0	1	8

Sheet B	1	2	3	4	5	6	7	8	9	10	11	12	13	Final
Alberta (Manahan)	1	1	1	1	0	3	1	0	0	1	1	0	0	10
Quebec (Simons)	0	0	0	0	2	0	0	5	2	0	0	1	1	11

Sheet C	1	2	3	4	5	6	7	8	9	10	11	12	Final
Saskatchewan (Whitter)	0	0	0	1	0	0	0	3	0	0	0	3	7
Manitoba (McTavish)	1	2	1	0	1	2	1	0	0	3	1	0	12

Sheet D	1	2	3	4	5	6	7	8	9	10	11	12	Final
Prince Edward Island (Saunders)	1	1	0	1	0	0	3	0	0	2	0	0	8
Northern Ontario (Ramsay)	0	0	3	0	1	2	0	3	2	0	1	2	14

Sheet E	1	2	3	4	5	6	7	8	9	10	11	12	Final
Nova Scotia (Haines)	1	0	0	0	2	0	1	0	0	1	0	0	5
Ontario (Asmussen)	0	2	1	2	0	3	0	1	2	0	2	0	13

=== Draw 5 ===
Wednesday, March 8 3:00 PM

Sheet A	1	2	3	4	5	6	7	8	9	10	11	12	Final
Northern Ontario (Ramsay)	1	0	1	1	2	0	0	3	0	0	3	0	11
Ontario (Asmussen)	0	1	0	0	0	1	0	0	1	1	0	1	5

Sheet B	1	2	3	4	5	6	7	8	9	10	11	12	Final
Saskatchewan (Whitter)	2	0	1	0	1	0	0	0	0	2	0	1	7
Nova Scotia (Haines)	0	3	0	1	0	1	2	1	4	0	1	0	13

Sheet C	1	2	3	4	5	6	7	8	9	10	11	12	Final
Alberta (Manahan)	0	1	3	3	0	2	0	6	0	3	1	2	21
Prince Edward Island (Saunders)	1	0	0	0	1	0	1	0	1	0	0	0	4

Sheet D	1	2	3	4	5	6	7	8	9	10	11	12	Final
Quebec (Simons)	0	0	0	1	0	0	2	2	2	1	0	0	8
New Brunswick (Vance)	1	0	2	0	2	0	0	0	0	0	1	1	7

Sheet E	1	2	3	4	5	6	7	8	9	10	11	12	Final
British Columbia (Cartmell)	0	0	1	0	1	1	1	0	0	1	0	1	6
Manitoba (McTavish)	0	1	0	0	0	0	0	1	2	0	1	0	5

=== Draw 6 ===
Wednesday, March 8 3:00 PM

Sheet A	1	2	3	4	5	6	7	8	9	10	11	12	Final
British Columbia (Cartmell)	1	1	0	0	0	2	0	1	0	0	0	1	6
Alberta (Manahan)	0	0	3	1	1	0	1	0	0	1	1	0	8

Sheet B	1	2	3	4	5	6	7	8	9	10	11	12	Final
New Brunswick (Vance)	0	1	0	1	0	0	1	0	4	0	0	2	9
Manitoba (McTavish)	1	0	2	0	1	1	0	3	0	7	2	0	17

Sheet C	1	2	3	4	5	6	7	8	9	10	11	12	Final
Quebec (Simons)	0	0	0	0	1	0	0	1	1	0	1	1	5
Nova Scotia (Haines)	0	0	0	0	0	1	1	0	0	1	0	0	3

Sheet D	1	2	3	4	5	6	7	8	9	10	11	12	Final
Prince Edward Island (Saunders)	1	1	0	0	1	0	0	2	0	0	0	1	6
Ontario (Asmussen)	0	0	4	1	0	3	3	0	2	3	2	0	18

Sheet E	1	2	3	4	5	6	7	8	9	10	11	12	Final
Northern Ontario (Ramsay)	0	3	0	0	2	1	0	3	0	1	0	1	11
Saskatchewan (Whitter)	1	0	0	1	0	0	1	0	1	0	1	0	5

=== Draw 7 ===
Thursday, March 9 9:30 AM

Sheet A	1	2	3	4	5	6	7	8	9	10	11	12	Final
Quebec (Simons)	2	0	3	0	1	0	2	3	1	0	0	1	13
Ontario (Asmussen)	0	1	0	2	0	2	0	0	0	2	1	0	8

Sheet B	1	2	3	4	5	6	7	8	9	10	11	12	Final
British Columbia (Cartmell)	0	1	0	0	1	0	0	0	1	0	2	0	5
Northern Ontario (Ramsay)	1	0	2	0	0	1	0	0	0	1	0	1	6

Sheet C	1	2	3	4	5	6	7	8	9	10	11	12	Final
Saskatchewan (Whitter)	4	1	0	5	0	0	2	0	0	2	1	1	16
Prince Edward Island (Saunders)	0	0	1	0	1	1	0	4	1	0	0	0	8

Sheet D	1	2	3	4	5	6	7	8	9	10	11	12	Final
Nova Scotia (Haines)	4	0	2	0	2	0	4	3	1	2	0	2	20
New Brunswick (Vance)	0	2	0	2	0	1	0	0	0	0	1	0	6

Sheet E	1	2	3	4	5	6	7	8	9	10	11	12	Final
Alberta (Manahan)	0	1	1	0	0	0	0	0	0	3	0	1	6
Manitoba (McTavish)	1	0	0	0	2	1	3	3	2	0	3	0	15

=== Draw 8 ===
Thursday, March 9 2:30 PM

Sheet A	1	2	3	4	5	6	7	8	9	10	11	12	Final
Saskatchewan (Whitter)	0	2	0	2	0	1	0	1	0	0	0	0	6
New Brunswick (Vance)	1	0	1	0	2	0	1	0	1	2	1	2	11

Sheet B	1	2	3	4	5	6	7	8	9	10	11	12	Final
Manitoba (McTavish)	2	2	1	3	0	0	2	1	2	3	0	0	16
Prince Edward Island (Saunders)	0	0	0	0	4	1	0	0	0	0	2	2	9

Sheet C	1	2	3	4	5	6	7	8	9	10	11	12	Final
British Columbia (Cartmell)	1	0	0	2	0	2	1	0	1	1	0	0	8
Quebec (Simons)	0	2	0	0	1	0	0	1	0	0	2	1	7

Sheet D	1	2	3	4	5	6	7	8	9	10	11	12	Final
Ontario (Asmussen)	0	0	1	0	0	0	1	1	0	3	1	0	7
Alberta (Manahan)	0	2	0	4	1	1	0	0	2	0	0	1	11

Sheet E	1	2	3	4	5	6	7	8	9	10	11	12	Final
Nova Scotia (Haines)	0	0	0	0	0	0	0	1	0	0	0	0	1
Northern Ontario (Ramsay)	2	1	3	1	1	1	1	0	1	1	1	1	14

=== Draw 9 ===
Thursday, March 9 7:30 PM

Sheet A	1	2	3	4	5	6	7	8	9	10	11	12	Final
Northern Ontario (Ramsay)	0	0	1	3	2	0	0	0	0	0	0	1	7
Manitoba (McTavish)	1	0	0	0	0	2	1	1	1	1	1	0	8

Sheet B	1	2	3	4	5	6	7	8	9	10	11	12	Final
Alberta (Manahan)	3	1	0	1	0	0	0	4	1	0	1	0	11
Nova Scotia (Haines)	0	0	1	0	2	1	1	0	0	4	0	1	10

Sheet C	1	2	3	4	5	6	7	8	9	10	11	12	Final
New Brunswick (Vance)	0	0	0	0	1	0	1	0	0	0	1	1	4
Ontario (Asmussen)	2	3	3	1	0	5	0	4	1	1	0	0	20

Sheet D	1	2	3	4	5	6	7	8	9	10	11	12	Final
Quebec (Simons)	0	0	0	1	0	0	0	0	0	1	0	X	2
Saskatchewan (Whitter)	2	2	1	0	1	3	3	1	3	0	0	X	16

Sheet E	1	2	3	4	5	6	7	8	9	10	11	12	Final
British Columbia (Cartmell)	1	0	0	3	0	0	0	0	3	0	2	0	9
Prince Edward Island (Saunders)	0	0	2	0	1	1	1	1	0	1	0	1	8

== Playoff ==
Tiebreaker #1		Tiebreaker #2
		Manitoba	13
Alberta	5	Ontario	8
Ontario	7

=== Tiebreaker #1 ===
Thursday, March 9

Sheet C	1	2	3	4	5	6	7	8	9	10	11	12	Final
Alberta (Manahan)	1	0	1	0	0	0	1	2	0	0	0	0	5
Ontario (Asmussen)	0	1	0	1	0	0	0	0	1	1	2	1	7

=== Tiebreaker #2 ===
Friday, March 10

Sheet C	1	2	3	4	5	6	7	8	9	10	11	12	Final
Manitoba (McTavish)	4	0	1	0	0	4	1	0	1	2	0	0	13
Ontario (Asmussen)	0	1	0	2	2	0	0	2	0	0	1	0	8
