= 1946 Macdonald Brier =

Canadian men's curling championship

- Host city: Saskatoon, Saskatchewan
- Arena: Saskatoon Arena
- Dates: March 4–7
- Attendance: 22,000
- Winner: Alberta
- Curling club: Sedgewick CC, Sedgewick
- Skip: Billy Rose
- Third: Bartley Swelin
- Second: Austin Smith
- Lead: George Crooks
- Finalist: Northern Ontario; Manitoba

The 1946 Macdonald Brier, the Canadian men's national curling championship, was held from March 4 to 7, 1946 at Saskatoon Arena in Saskatoon, Saskatchewan. Saskatoon was supposed to host the 1943 Brier, which was cancelled due to the onset of World War II and was promised they would host the next Brier once the competition was resumed. This was the first Brier in which total attendance was recorded, which came to 22,000.

The event was opened by Saskatchewan Premier Tommy Douglas. For the first time ever, games were broadcast live across the country on CBC Radio. Doug Smith and Bill Good did the commentary.

For the first time since the 1928 Brier, there was a three-way tie for first place after round robin play as Alberta, Manitoba, and Northern Ontario all finished with 7-2 records. Team Alberta, skipped by Billy Rose, captured the Brier Tankard by defeating both Manitoba and Northern Ontario in the tiebreaker playoff. This was Alberta's fourth Brier championship overall.

This was the second straight Brier in which there were no extra ends.

== Event Summary ==
In the first edition of the Brier since 1942, the 1946 edition would prove to be one of the most exciting Brier finishes to date. Through six draws, there were six teams that had a shot at winning the Brier as Manitoba, Northern Ontario, and Ontario were all 5-1, Alberta and Saskatchewan were 4-2, and British Columbia stood at 3-3 with the next draw (Draw 7) featuring three matchups between those six teams. In that draw, British Columbia stayed alive with a 9-8 win over Ontario, Alberta defeated Northern Ontario 8-4, and Manitoba defeated Saskatchewan 10-8. In the eighth draw, British Columbia beat Manitoba 12-10 while Northern Ontario picked up a 10-7 win over Ontario. Alberta and Saskatchewan won their matches over Nova Scotia and New Brunswick respectively.

Heading into the final draw (Draw 9), all six teams were within one game of each other as Alberta, Manitoba, and Northern Ontario were all 6-2 and British Columbia, Ontario, and Saskatchewan were all 5-3. With British Columbia and Saskatchewan drawn against one another in the final draw, there was a possibility of a five-way tie for the Brier championship. For that scenario to take place, the British Columbia/Saskatchewan winner would need Ontario to defeat Alberta and have both Manitoba and Northern Ontario to lose. A win by any of the 6-2 teams would eliminate all five win teams from contention and would ensure at least a spot in the tiebreaker playoff or even winning the championship outright if two of the three six win teams lost.

In the end, Alberta, Manitoba, and Northern Ontario won their matches as all three teams finished round robin play with 7-2 records, necessitating a tiebreaker playoff between those three teams. This was the second time that three teams were tied after round robin play, with the first being in 1928. Unlike the previous three-way tiebreaker playoff (which was a round robin between the three tied teams), this one only featured a semifinal and final. In the ensuing draw, Northern Ontario drew the bye while Alberta and Manitoba played in the semifinal with the winner playing Northern Ontario in the final.

In the semifinal, Alberta trailed Manitoba 6-2 after the sixth end, but Alberta scored five points in the next four ends to take a 7-6 lead heading into the final two ends. Manitoba tied the game in the eleventh end but Alberta scored one in the final end to win 8-7. In the final between Alberta and Northern Ontario, Alberta held a 6-4 lead after eight ends. Northern Ontario scored one in the ninth and stole one in the tenth to tie the game at 6 with two ends remaining. Alberta scored one in the eleventh to take the lead and sealed the Brier Tankard with a steal of one in the final end for an 8-6 victory. The game started after 10pm, and lasted over four and a half hours.

== Teams ==
The teams are listed as follows:

Alberta	British Columbia	Manitoba	New Brunswick	Northern Ontario
Sedgewick CC, Sedgewick Skip: Billy Rose; Third: Bartley Swelin; Second: Austin Smith; Lead: George Crooks	Vancouver CC, Vancouver Skip: Francis Avery; Third: Robert Brown; Second: Robert Henderson; Lead: Edward Wiginton	Strathcona CC, Winnipeg Skip: Leo Johnson; Third: Harry Weremy; Second: Lincoln Johnson; Lead: William McKnight	St. Andrews CC, Saint John Skip: Fenwick McKelvey; Third: Henry Hollies; Second: Everett MacLean; Lead: Frederick Mayes	Kirkland Lake CC, Kirkland Lake Skip: Tom Ramsay; Third: Walter Spencer; Second: Gray Coughlin; Lead: Hugh Colquhoun
Nova Scotia	Ontario	Prince Edward Island	Quebec	Saskatchewan
Halifax CC, Halifax Skip: George MacIntosh; Third: John Snow; Second: Bernard Cleveland; Lead: Harold Williams	Granite CC, Kitchener Skip: Perry Hall; Third: Bert Hall; Second: Arthur Lehnen; Lead: William Henderson Jr.	Charlottetown CC, Charlottetown Skip: Frank Hansen; Third: Walter Picard; Second: Frank Cox; Lead: Caleb Whitlock	St. George CC, Westmount Skip: Edward Thompson; Third: Kenneth Gebbie; Second: Benjamin Ferguson; Lead: James Patton	Nutana CC, Saskatoon Skip: Dalton Henderson; Third: John Brower; Second: Clifford Annabel; Lead: Montague Bruns

== Round-robin standings ==
Key
Teams to Tiebreaker playoff

Province	Skip	W	L	PF	PA
Manitoba	Leo Johnson	7	2	95	83
Alberta	Billy Rose	7	2	109	71
Northern Ontario	Tom Ramsay	7	2	97	64
British Columbia	Francis Avery	6	3	106	70
Saskatchewan	Dalton Henderson	5	4	92	79
Ontario	Perry Hall	5	4	98	81
Quebec	Edward Thompson	3	6	86	104
New Brunswick	Fenwick McKelvey	2	7	66	97
Nova Scotia	George MacIntosh	2	7	72	116
Prince Edward Island	Frank Hansen	1	8	66	122

== Round-robin results ==
=== Draw 1 ===
Sheet A	1	2	3	4	5	6	7	8	9	10	11	12	Final
Alberta (Rose)	1	3	1	0	0	1	1	0	3	1	1	0	12
New Brunswick (McKelvey)	0	0	0	1	1	0	0	1	0	0	0	1	4

Sheet B	1	2	3	4	5	6	7	8	9	10	11	12	Final
Manitoba (Johnson)	0	2	0	2	0	1	0	1	3	2	2	0	13
Nova Scotia (MacIntosh)	2	0	2	0	3	0	1	0	0	0	0	1	9

Sheet C	1	2	3	4	5	6	7	8	9	10	11	12	Final
Northern Ontario (Ramsay)	1	0	1	2	2	0	0	2	3	2	0	4	17
Prince Edward Island (Hansen)	0	1	0	0	0	1	1	0	0	0	3	0	6

Sheet D	1	2	3	4	5	6	7	8	9	10	11	12	Final
British Columbia (Avery)	1	3	0	2	0	1	4	0	4	1	0	1	17
Quebec (Thompson)	0	0	2	0	1	0	0	2	0	0	2	0	7

Sheet E	1	2	3	4	5	6	7	8	9	10	11	12	Final
Saskatchewan (Henderson)	1	1	0	3	1	0	2	3	0	4	0	1	16
Ontario (Hall)	0	0	1	0	0	4	0	0	4	0	1	0	10

=== Draw 2 ===
Sheet A	1	2	3	4	5	6	7	8	9	10	11	12	Final
Prince Edward Island (Hansen)	0	0	0	2	1	0	0	1	0	2	0	0	6
Ontario (Hall)	0	0	3	0	0	2	3	0	1	0	2	1	12

Sheet B	1	2	3	4	5	6	7	8	9	10	11	12	Final
Alberta (Rose)	0	0	3	0	0	0	4	0	2	2	0	2	13
British Columbia (Avery)	1	3	0	4	1	1	0	1	0	0	0	0	11

Sheet C	1	2	3	4	5	6	7	8	9	10	11	12	Final
Saskatchewan (Henderson)	1	1	2	1	0	4	0	1	1	0	3	0	14
Nova Scotia (MacIntosh)	0	0	0	0	3	0	2	0	0	2	0	0	7

Sheet D	1	2	3	4	5	6	7	8	9	10	11	12	Final
New Brunswick (McKelvey)	0	0	0	1	0	0	1	0	1	0	0	1	4
Northern Ontario (Ramsay)	1	2	1	0	1	3	0	2	0	1	2	0	13

Sheet E	1	2	3	4	5	6	7	8	9	10	11	12	Final
Manitoba (Johnson)	3	0	2	0	0	2	0	0	2	0	2	0	11
Quebec (Thompson)	0	3	0	2	0	0	1	1	0	2	0	1	10

=== Draw 3 ===
Sheet A	1	2	3	4	5	6	7	8	9	10	11	12	Final
Northern Ontario (Ramsay)	0	0	1	0	2	1	0	2	1	1	0	1	9
British Columbia (Avery)	3	1	0	2	0	0	1	0	0	0	1	0	8

Sheet B	1	2	3	4	5	6	7	8	9	10	11	12	Final
Quebec (Thompson)	0	0	2	1	0	2	1	0	0	1	1	2	10
Saskatchewan (Henderson)	1	1	0	0	2	0	0	1	1	0	0	0	6

Sheet C	1	2	3	4	5	6	7	8	9	10	11	12	Final
Nova Scotia (MacIntosh)	3	3	2	0	1	0	0	0	4	1	0	0	14
Prince Edward Island (Hansen)	0	0	0	1	0	1	3	1	0	0	3	1	10

Sheet D	1	2	3	4	5	6	7	8	9	10	11	12	Final
Ontario (Hall)	3	0	1	0	3	0	1	2	0	3	0	3	16
New Brunswick (McKelvey)	0	1	0	3	0	2	0	0	1	0	2	0	9

Sheet E	1	2	3	4	5	6	7	8	9	10	11	12	Final
Manitoba (Johnson)	1	2	0	4	0	1	0	0	2	0	3	0	13
Alberta (Rose)	0	0	2	0	2	0	0	1	0	2	0	5	12

=== Draw 4 ===
Sheet A	1	2	3	4	5	6	7	8	9	10	11	12	Final
Alberta (Rose)	2	0	2	0	3	1	1	1	3	0	4	1	18
Prince Edward Island (Hansen)	0	1	0	1	0	0	0	0	0	1	0	0	3

Sheet B	1	2	3	4	5	6	7	8	9	10	11	12	Final
Quebec (Thompson)	2	2	0	0	3	0	0	1	1	1	0	2	12
New Brunswick (McKelvey)	0	0	4	2	0	0	1	0	0	0	1	0	8

Sheet C	1	2	3	4	5	6	7	8	9	10	11	12	Final
Northern Ontario (Ramsay)	1	0	0	1	2	0	1	0	1	0	3	1	10
Saskatchewan (Henderson)	0	0	3	0	0	1	0	2	0	1	0	0	7

Sheet D	1	2	3	4	5	6	7	8	9	10	11	12	Final
Nova Scotia (MacIntosh)	2	4	0	0	0	1	0	2	0	1	1	0	11
British Columbia (Avery)	0	0	0	1	1	0	5	0	2	0	0	1	10

Sheet E	1	2	3	4	5	6	7	8	9	10	11	12	Final
Ontario (Hall)	0	0	1	0	0	0	0	4	0	0	4	1	10
Manitoba (Johnson)	0	1	0	0	3	0	1	0	0	2	0	0	7

=== Draw 5 ===
Sheet A	1	2	3	4	5	6	7	8	9	10	11	12	Final
Northern Ontario (Ramsay)	0	1	1	1	1	0	5	0	1	0	4	0	14
Nova Scotia (MacIntosh)	1	0	0	0	0	0	0	0	0	2	0	1	4

Sheet B	1	2	3	4	5	6	7	8	9	10	11	12	Final
Manitoba (Johnson)	0	1	1	0	2	0	1	0	0	3	0	1	9
New Brunswick (McKelvey)	1	0	0	1	0	1	0	1	1	0	2	0	7

Sheet C	1	2	3	4	5	6	7	8	9	10	11	12	Final
British Columbia (Avery)	2	2	4	1	1	0	2	0	0	0	4	1	17
Prince Edward Island (Hansen)	0	0	0	0	0	2	0	1	1	1	0	0	5

Sheet D	1	2	3	4	5	6	7	8	9	10	11	12	Final
Ontario (Hall)	1	1	3	0	1	0	3	0	0	5	0	0	14
Quebec (Thompson)	0	0	0	1	0	1	0	1	1	0	1	1	6

Sheet E	1	2	3	4	5	6	7	8	9	10	11	12	Final
Saskatchewan (Henderson)	1	0	1	1	0	2	3	0	2	0	1	3	14
Alberta (Rose)	0	1	0	0	1	0	0	2	0	4	0	0	8

=== Draw 6 ===
Sheet A	1	2	3	4	5	6	7	8	9	10	11	12	Final
Saskatchewan (Henderson)	1	3	0	4	1	0	1	0	3	0	1	1	15
Prince Edward Island (Hansen)	0	0	1	0	0	1	0	2	0	1	0	0	5

Sheet B	1	2	3	4	5	6	7	8	9	10	11	12	Final
Alberta (Rose)	3	3	2	0	0	1	0	3	2	0	0	1	15
Quebec (Thompson)	0	0	0	1	2	0	2	0	0	2	0	0	7

Sheet C	1	2	3	4	5	6	7	8	9	10	11	12	Final
British Columbia (Avery)	1	0	3	1	1	0	1	2	0	0	0	0	9
New Brunswick (McKelvey)	0	1	0	0	0	1	0	0	1	1	0	1	5

Sheet D	1	2	3	4	5	6	7	8	9	10	11	12	Final
Ontario (Hall)	1	0	0	1	0	1	2	2	0	3	2	0	12
Nova Scotia (MacIntosh)	0	2	2	0	1	0	0	0	2	0	0	1	8

Sheet E	1	2	3	4	5	6	7	8	9	10	11	12	Final
Manitoba (Johnson)	0	1	1	0	1	0	5	0	3	1	0	0	12
Northern Ontario (Ramsay)	2	0	0	1	0	1	0	2	0	0	2	1	9

=== Draw 7 ===
Sheet A	1	2	3	4	5	6	7	8	9	10	11	12	Final
Quebec (Thompson)	2	0	3	0	2	2	0	3	2	0	3	0	17
Nova Scotia (MacIntosh)	0	1	0	1	0	0	1	0	0	1	0	1	5

Sheet B	1	2	3	4	5	6	7	8	9	10	11	12	Final
Alberta (Rose)	2	1	0	1	0	1	0	0	0	1	2	0	8
Northern Ontario (Ramsay)	0	0	1	0	1	0	0	1	0	0	0	1	4

Sheet C	1	2	3	4	5	6	7	8	9	10	11	12	Final
New Brunswick (McKelvey)	0	3	0	1	2	0	0	0	0	2	0	2	10
Prince Edward Island (Hansen)	2	0	1	0	0	0	1	1	0	0	3	0	8

Sheet D	1	2	3	4	5	6	7	8	9	10	11	12	Final
British Columbia (Avery)	2	0	1	0	1	4	0	0	0	0	1	0	9
Ontario (Hall)	0	1	0	0	0	0	1	0	2	3	0	1	8

Sheet E	1	2	3	4	5	6	7	8	9	10	11	12	Final
Manitoba (Johnson)	1	0	2	0	1	0	1	0	3	2	0	0	10
Saskatchewan (Henderson)	0	1	0	2	0	1	0	2	0	0	1	1	8

=== Draw 8 ===
Sheet A	1	2	3	4	5	6	7	8	9	10	11	12	Final
Prince Edward Island (Hansen)	0	0	1	1	5	1	0	1	2	0	3	3	17
Quebec (Thompson)	4	1	0	0	0	0	3	0	0	1	0	0	9

Sheet B	1	2	3	4	5	6	7	8	9	10	11	12	Final
Saskatchewan (Henderson)	1	0	0	1	2	3	0	1	0	0	2	0	10
New Brunswick (McKelvey)	0	1	1	0	0	0	1	0	1	1	0	1	6

Sheet C	1	2	3	4	5	6	7	8	9	10	11	12	Final
Northern Ontario (Ramsay)	0	3	1	0	1	0	3	1	0	1	0	0	10
Ontario (Hall)	1	0	0	1	0	2	0	0	1	0	1	1	7

Sheet D	1	2	3	4	5	6	7	8	9	10	11	12	Final
Alberta (Rose)	0	0	0	1	2	0	3	2	0	2	3	0	13
Nova Scotia (MacIntosh)	1	0	1	0	0	1	0	0	2	0	0	1	6

Sheet E	1	2	3	4	5	6	7	8	9	10	11	12	Final
British Columbia (Avery)	0	1	2	0	2	2	0	1	0	2	2	0	12
Manitoba (Johnson)	1	0	0	1	0	0	3	0	2	0	0	3	10

=== Draw 9 ===
Sheet A	1	2	3	4	5	6	7	8	9	10	11	12	Final
Alberta (Rose)	0	2	2	0	1	1	0	2	0	2	0	0	10
Ontario (Hall)	1	0	0	2	0	0	1	0	2	0	2	1	9

Sheet B	1	2	3	4	5	6	7	8	9	10	11	12	Final
Manitoba (Johnson)	0	1	0	0	1	1	0	5	0	1	0	1	10
Prince Edward Island (Hansen)	1	0	1	1	0	0	1	0	1	0	1	0	6

Sheet C	1	2	3	4	5	6	7	8	9	10	11	12	Final
British Columbia (Avery)	2	1	0	0	1	1	2	2	1	1	1	1	13
Saskatchewan (Henderson)	0	0	1	1	0	0	0	0	0	0	0	0	2

Sheet D	1	2	3	4	5	6	7	8	9	10	11	12	Final
New Brunswick (McKelvey)	2	0	1	3	2	2	0	0	1	0	2	0	13
Nova Scotia (MacIntosh)	0	2	0	0	0	0	1	2	0	2	0	1	8

Sheet E	1	2	3	4	5	6	7	8	9	10	11	12	Final
Northern Ontario (Ramsay)	0	2	0	0	1	2	0	1	0	2	3	0	11
Quebec (Thompson)	1	0	0	1	0	0	1	0	4	0	0	1	8

== Playoffs ==
Semifinal		Final
		Northern Ontario	6
Alberta	8	Alberta	8
Manitoba	7

=== Semifinal ===
Sheet A	1	2	3	4	5	6	7	8	9	10	11	12	Final
Alberta (Rose)	0	1	0	1	0	0	1	2	1	1	0	1	8
Manitoba (Johnson)	1	0	2	0	1	2	0	0	0	0	1	0	7

=== Final ===
Sheet A	1	2	3	4	5	6	7	8	9	10	11	12	Final
Alberta (Rose)	0	1	0	2	0	2	0	1	0	0	1	1	8
Northern Ontario (Ramsey)	2	0	0	0	1	0	1	0	1	1	0	0	6
