= Billy Rose (curler) =

Canadian curler

- Curler
- Born: April 11, 1904; Minot, North Dakota, United States
- Died: October 6, 1987 (aged 83); Edmonton, Alberta, Canada
Medal record
Representing Alberta
Macdonald Brier
Gold medal – first place	1946 Saskatoon
Silver medal – second place	1936 Toronto

William Warren Rose (April 11, 1904 – October 6, 1987) was a Canadian curler. He was the skip of the 1946 Brier Champion team representing Alberta. Rose was born in Sedgewick, Alberta and was inducted into the Alberta Sports Hall of Fame and Museum in 1980.
