= Wally Knock =

Canadian curler

- Curler
- Born: November 23, 1913; Lunenburg, Nova Scotia
- Died: February 11, 1988 (aged 74); Halifax, Nova Scotia

Team
- Curling club: Kentville Curling Club
Medal record
Representing Nova Scotia
Macdonald Brier
Gold medal – first place	1951 Halifax

Wallace Fenwick Knock (November 23, 1913 – February 11, 1988) was a Canadian curler. He was the lead on the 1951 Brier Champion team, skipped by Don Oyler.
