= Fred Dyke =

Canadian curler

- Curler
- Born: December 27, 1922; Yarmouth, Nova Scotia
- Died: June 28, 2012 (aged 89); Coldbrook, Nova Scotia

Team
- Curling club: Kentville Curling Club
Medal record
Representing Nova Scotia
Macdonald Brier
Gold medal – first place	1951 Halifax

Frederick William Dyke (December 27, 1922 – June 28, 2012) was a Canadian curler from Nova Scotia. He played as second on the 1951 Brier Champion team, skipped by Don Oyler.
