= Gordon Campbell (curler) =

Canadian curler (1906–1995)

Medal record

Men's Curling

Representing Ontario

Macdonald Brier
Gold medal – first place	1935 Toronto	
Silver medal – second place	1933 Toronto	
Silver medal – second place	1934 Toronto	
Silver medal – second place	1942 Quebec City	

Gordon Monroe Campbell (December 1906–February 27, 1995) was a Canadian curler. He was the skip of the 1935 Macdonald Brier championship team, Canada's national men's curling championship.

== Career ==
=== Immediate success (1930–1936) ===
Campbell, who lived on Robinson Street in Hamilton, only began curling in 1930 at the nearby Thistle Club, where he had learned to skate.

For the 1931–32 season, Campbell formed a rink with himself as skip, his brothers Duncan at lead and Donald at third, plus Gordon Coats at second . They had a fairly successful season, winning the Governor General's Trophy and district cup double-rink events with Harry Weller, the Hamilton Bonspiel, and the club championship of the Thistle Curling Club.

In 1933, the team continued their success by winning the Grand Aggregate of the Toronto Bonspiel, qualifying them for the playoff to determine Ontario's representative at the 1933 Macdonald Brier. The team then went on to defeat a team from Orillia, skipped by Dr. J.N. Harvie, the Ontario (Silver) Tankard champions, 19–4 to claim the provincial championship. The team then went on to represent Ontario at the 1933 Brier, where they finished the round robin tied for second with a 5–2 record. This put them into a playoff against Manitoba's John Douglas rink to win second place honours, which they won 12–8. When the team showed up with Ontario Curling Association crests on their sweaters, Macdonald Tobacco (the event sponsors) decided to give all participants heart-shaped crests in future events, a tradition that continues to exist. In addition to their provincial title, the rink also won another Governor General's Trophy with Weller, and the Dalley Trophy.

In 1934, the Ontario Curling Association converted the Ontario Tankard event from a double-rink event to a single-rink tournament so that the winner could represent the province at the Brier. Campbell and his rink made it to the finals, where they defeated Dick Butler of Lindsay, 25–9. The team then represented Ontario at the 1934 Macdonald Brier. The event came down to the last draw, where they faced off against the undefeated (6–0) Leo Johnson, rink representing Manitoba, while they were at 5–1, with a shot at tying them for first. The game went into an extra-end, where Campbell missed a takeout on his final stone, conceding the victory and the championship. In addition to winning the Ontario Tankard, Campbell also won the Dixon cup, the Thornburn trophy at the High Park bonspiel, and the Dalley trophy at the Hamilton bonspiel.

In 1935, the team won their second-straight Ontario Tankard title, defeating Fred Lumb from Kingston in the final, 14–10, sending them to their third straight Brier. At the 1935 Macdonald Brier, Campbell led his rink to claim Ontario's first ever Brier championship, finishing the event with a 6–1 record.

As defending Brier champions, Campbell and his rink were invited to participate in the 1936 Winnipeg Bonspiel, leading the first delegation from eastern Canada to participate in the event. There, the team had to play on natural ice (which they had never done before), and had to play through extreme cold. They made it to the semifinals of the Sir John C. Eaton trophy event (open only to visiting rinks) before bowing out. Later in the month, the team was knocked out in the second round of Ontario Tankard playdowns to Joe Bergin of Fergus.

=== Later career (1937–1951) ===
In 1937, the team (with Duncan throwing second and new lead Bob Cross) won the Hamilton Bonspiel, going undefeated at the event, and claiming both the Spectator and Westinghouse trophies. Later that month, the team was eliminated in the semifinals of the group playdowns for the Ontario Tankard against Dr. J.A. Wright of London.

In 1938, Campbell and his team were knocked out of contention for the provincial championships (now called the British Consols), in district playdowns, losing to T.S. Graham of Toronto. Later in the season, he led a mixed team to victory at the Weller Trophy event, defeating his brother Don in the final. Following the season, the three Campbell brothers would not play together on the same team again until 1970.

Campbell, along with A.R. Tarlton won the Ontario Silver Tankard again in 1941 for the Hamilton Thistle Club, this time after it returned to being a double-rink event, and with it no longer being the provincial championship to determine the province's Brier representative.

In 1942, Campbell finally won another Ontario championship, when he and teammates Duncan Campbell, Bill Kennedy and Rufus Stone defeated Ken Miles 14–9 of the High Park Club in the provincial final. The win earned the rink a spot at the 1942 Macdonald Brier where they would represent Ontario. At the Brier, Campbell faced-off against his brother and former teammate Don in Draw 5. Don, who was skipping Team British Columbia won the battle of the brothers 14–6. Both Campbell-led teams ended up tied in second place with identical 7–2 records, which would have normally resulted in a tiebreaker game. However, the Quebec Aces hockey team needed the arena for their QSHL playoffs, so it was announced that no tiebreaker playoff would be played and that the tie for second place would be allowed to stand.

In 1944, Campbell was named president of the Hamilton Thistle Curling Club.

Campbell later joined forces with Canadian Curling Association president Colin Campbell (no relation) who curled out of The Granite Club in Toronto. In 1948, they won the Imico Trophy. The two Campbells, with Colin at lead, Reginald Mooney at second and Stanley Jones at third won the 1951 provincial championship, defeating Charley Cassels of Hamilton Thistle in the final, 13–11. Representing Ontario at the 1951 Macdonald Brier, the team finished with a 6–4 record.

== Retirement ==
In 1957, Campbell became manager of the three-year old Oakville Curling Club, serving in that capacity before retiring in 1971. He was inducted into the Canadian Curling Hall of Fame as a builder in 1975, and was described by the Canadian Curling Association president Bud Olson as "a lifetime builder and worker for curling".

Campbell stopped curling at the age of 70. He threw out the ceremonial first stone at the 1991 Labatt Brier which was hosted in Hamilton. At the time, he was the oldest surviving Brier winner.

== Death and personal life ==
Campbell died in 1995 while wintering in Spain. At the time, he was living in Mar, Ontario, He had been a member of the Wiarton Curling Club later in his life. He was married to Jessie Paisley, and had three children. His granddaughter Janet Tupper represented British Columbia at the 1990 Canadian Junior Curling Championships. Earlier in his life, he and brother Don owned their father's glass business, and founded Campbell Glass in Hamilton.
