= Marno Frederickson =

Canadian curler

- Curler
- Born: April 6, 1906; Glenboro, Manitoba
- Died: April 28, 1992 (aged 86); Winnipeg, Manitoba
Medal record
Representing Manitoba
Macdonald Brier
Gold medal – first place	1934 Toronto

Halldor Marno Frederickson (April 6, 1906 – April 28, 1992) was a Canadian curler. He was the lead of the 1934 Brier Champion team (skipped by Leo Johnson), representing Manitoba.
