= 1934 Macdonald Brier =

Canadian men's curling championship

- Host city: Toronto, Ontario
- Arena: Granite Curling Club
- Dates: March 6–8
- Winner: Manitoba
- Curling club: Strathcona CC, Winnipeg
- Skip: Leo Johnson
- Third: Lorne Stewart
- Second: Lincoln Johnson
- Lead: Marno Frederickson

The 1934 Macdonald Brier, the Canadian men's national curling championship, was held from March 6 to 8, 1934 at the Granite Club in Toronto, Ontario.

Team Manitoba, skipped by Leo Johnson, finished round robin play undefeated with a 7-0 record to take Manitoba's sixth Brier Tankard. Johnson's rink became the second team to finish Brier play undefeated after fellow Manitoban team Gordon Hudson was the first back in 1929. Manitoba won the event in their last game, when they defeated Ontario in front of 2,000 fans. Tied in the last end, Johnson made a "dramatic last rock draw" to win the game.

Ontario's 26-2 victory over Nova Scotia in Draw 1 set Brier records at the time for the most points scored in a game by one team (26) and for the largest margin of victory (24).

== Teams ==
The teams are listed as follows:

Alberta	Manitoba	New Brunswick	Northern Ontario
Macleod CC, Fort Macleod Skip: Orwell Stewart; Third: George Stewart; Second: Gordon Stewart; Lead: William Andrews	Strathcona CC, Winnipeg Skip: Leo Johnson; Third: Lorne Stewart; Second: Lincoln Johnson; Lead: Marno Frederickson	Newcastle CC, Newcastle Skip: Waldo Crocker; Third: Robert Galloway; Second: Bunn Green; Lead: Perley Roy	Sault Ste. Marie CC, Sault Ste. Marie Skip: James Shaw; Third: Herbert Lash; Second: Noble Kenny; Lead: Frank Elliott
Nova Scotia	Ontario	Quebec	Saskatchewan
Windsor CC, Windsor Skip: Harold Anslow; Third: Logan Smith; Second: Everett Knowles; Lead: Karl Domock	Thistle CC, Hamilton Skip: Gordon M. Campbell; Third: Donald A. Campbell; Second: Gordon Coates; Lead: Duncan A. Campbell	Victoria CC, Quebec City Skip: A. H. M. Hay; Third: Roméo Langlais; Second: Hugh Weyman; Lead: F. E. Findlay	Nutana CC, Saskatoon Skip: Robert McLean; Third: C. B. Anderson; Second: Edward Robertson; Lead: James McNeill

== Round Robin standings ==
Key
Brier champion

Province	Skip	W	L	PF	PA
Manitoba	Leo Johnson	7	0	86	52
Ontario	Gordon M. Campbell	5	2	107	51
Saskatchewan	Robert McLean	4	3	81	59
New Brunswick	Waldo Crocker	4	3	83	91
Alberta	Orwell Stewart	3	4	71	68
Quebec	A. H. M. Hay	2	5	62	97
Northern Ontario	James Shaw	2	5	65	70
Nova Scotia	Harold Anslow	1	6	52	119

== Round Robin results ==
=== Draw 1 ===
Sheet A	1	2	3	4	5	6	7	8	9	10	11	12	Final
Quebec (Hay)	0	1	0	2	2	0	0	3	2	0	0	1	11
Saskatchewan (McLean)	3	0	2	0	0	1	2	0	0	1	1	0	10

Sheet B	1	2	3	4	5	6	7	8	9	10	11	12	Final
Alberta (Stewart)	0	1	0	0	0	0	2	0	1	0	2	2	8
Manitoba (Johnson)	1	0	1	1	1	1	0	2	0	4	0	0	11

Sheet C	1	2	3	4	5	6	7	8	9	10	11	12	Final
Nova Scotia (Anslow)	0	0	0	2	0	0	0	0	0	0	0	0	2
Ontario (Campbell)	1	1	2	0	2	1	2	3	3	4	5	2	26

Sheet D	1	2	3	4	5	6	7	8	9	10	11	12	Final
New Brunswick (Crocker)	1	0	4	0	0	0	4	1	0	2	0	2	14
Northern Ontario (Shaw)	0	2	0	3	1	1	0	0	3	0	1	0	11

=== Draw 2 ===
Sheet A	1	2	3	4	5	6	7	8	9	10	11	12	Final
Ontario (Campbell)	0	2	1	0	0	4	2	0	0	0	0	1	10
Northern Ontario (Shaw)	1	0	0	1	1	0	0	1	3	1	1	0	9

Sheet B	1	2	3	4	5	6	7	8	9	10	11	12	Final
Saskatchewan (McLean)	2	2	0	0	1	0	2	0	1	1	1	0	10
Alberta (Stewart)	0	0	3	1	0	2	0	1	0	0	0	0	7

Sheet C	1	2	3	4	5	6	7	8	9	10	11	12	Final
Nova Scotia (Anslow)	0	1	0	2	0	1	2	0	0	0	0	1	7
Manitoba (Johnson)	1	0	3	0	3	0	0	1	3	2	2	0	15

Sheet D	1	2	3	4	5	6	7	8	9	10	11	12	Final
Quebec (Hay)	0	1	0	1	0	1	1	0	0	0	1	0	5
New Brunswick (Crocker)	4	0	5	0	1	0	0	1	2	1	0	2	16

=== Draw 3 ===
Sheet A	1	2	3	4	5	6	7	8	9	10	11	12	Final
Quebec (Hay)	1	0	2	2	0	2	0	2	1	0	3	0	13
Northern Ontario (Shaw)	0	1	0	0	2	0	2	0	0	1	0	3	9

Sheet B	1	2	3	4	5	6	7	8	9	10	11	12	Final
Alberta (Stewart)	0	3	0	2	1	2	0	3	1	1	0	1	14
Ontario (Campbell)	1	0	1	0	0	0	1	0	0	0	2	0	5

Sheet C	1	2	3	4	5	6	7	8	9	10	11	12	Final
Nova Scotia (Anslow)	0	0	0	3	0	0	2	1	0	2	0	0	8
New Brunswick (Crocker)	1	2	1	0	2	4	0	0	4	0	4	1	19

Sheet D	1	2	3	4	5	6	7	8	9	10	11	12	Final
Saskatchewan (McLean)	1	0	1	0	0	1	1	0	1	0	0	1	6
Manitoba (Johnson)	0	1	0	2	3	0	0	3	0	1	2	0	12

=== Draw 4 ===
Sheet A	1	2	3	4	5	6	7	8	9	10	11	12	Final
Alberta (Stewart)	1	1	0	0	2	0	1	0	1	1	0	0	7
Northern Ontario (Shaw)	0	0	2	1	0	1	0	1	0	0	1	2	8

Sheet B	1	2	3	4	5	6	7	8	9	10	11	12	Final
Ontario (Campbell)	6	3	0	0	3	0	5	0	2	0	3	1	23
New Brunswick (Crocker)	0	0	1	3	0	3	0	0	0	0	0	0	7

Sheet C	1	2	3	4	5	6	7	8	9	10	11	12	Final
Quebec (Hay)	0	2	0	1	0	0	0	1	3	0	0	0	7
Manitoba (Johnson)	2	0	2	0	5	1	3	0	0	1	0	1	15

Sheet D	1	2	3	4	5	6	7	8	9	10	11	12	Final
Saskatchewan (McLean)	5	2	0	1	0	3	0	5	0	4	0	3	23
Nova Scotia (Anslow)	0	0	0	0	1	0	1	0	1	0	1	0	4

=== Draw 5 ===
Sheet A	1	2	3	4	5	6	7	8	9	10	11	12	Final
New Brunswick (Crocker)	0	0	4	0	4	0	0	0	3	0	0	3	14
Alberta (Stewart)	1	1	0	1	0	3	1	1	0	3	2	0	13

Sheet B	1	2	3	4	5	6	7	8	9	10	11	12	Final
Northern Ontario (Shaw)	1	1	0	1	0	0	0	0	2	0	0	3	8
Manitoba (Johnson)	0	0	1	0	4	1	1	1	0	0	2	0	10

Sheet C	1	2	3	4	5	6	7	8	9	10	11	12	Final
Quebec (Hay)	1	0	0	1	0	2	0	0	2	1	2	3	12
Nova Scotia (Anslow)	0	4	5	0	1	0	1	3	0	0	0	0	14

Sheet D	1	2	3	4	5	6	7	8	9	10	11	12	Final
Saskatchewan (McLean)	0	3	0	0	0	1	0	0	1	0	0	1	6
Ontario (Campbell)	2	0	1	1	1	0	1	2	0	3	2	0	13

=== Draw 6 ===
Sheet A	1	2	3	4	5	6	7	8	9	10	11	12	Final
Manitoba (Johnson)	4	0	2	1	1	0	2	0	3	0	1	0	14
New Brunswick (Crocker)	0	2	0	0	0	2	0	1	0	2	0	1	8

Sheet B	1	2	3	4	5	6	7	8	9	10	11	12	Final
Ontario (Campbell)	1	0	6	0	0	2	3	0	3	4	3	0	22
Quebec (Hay)	0	1	0	1	1	0	0	0	0	0	0	1	4

Sheet C	1	2	3	4	5	6	7	8	9	10	11	12	Final
Saskatchewan (McLean)	0	0	0	0	2	1	0	4	0	1	1	0	9
Northern Ontario (Shaw)	1	1	1	1	0	0	0	0	1	0	0	2	7

Sheet D	1	2	3	4	5	6	7	8	9	10	11	12	Final
Alberta (Stewart)	2	1	0	1	0	4	0	1	0	1	1	0	11
Nova Scotia (Anslow)	0	0	3	0	1	0	3	0	1	0	0	2	10

=== Draw 7 ===
Sheet A	1	2	3	4	5	6	7	8	9	10	11	12	13	Final
Manitoba (Johnson)	0	0	6	1	0	0	0	0	1	0	0	0	1	9
Ontario (Campbell)	1	1	0	0	0	1	1	0	0	1	1	2	0	8

Sheet B	1	2	3	4	5	6	7	8	9	10	11	12	Final
Saskatchewan (McLean)	4	0	0	2	3	1	0	1	1	0	4	1	17
New Brunswick (Crocker)	0	1	1	0	0	0	2	0	0	1	0	0	5

Sheet C	1	2	3	4	5	6	7	8	9	10	11	12	Final
Alberta (Stewart)	1	2	4	0	0	0	1	1	1	0	1	0	11
Quebec (Hay)	0	0	0	1	1	3	0	0	0	3	0	2	10

Sheet D	1	2	3	4	5	6	7	8	9	10	11	12	Final
Northern Ontario (Shaw)	1	0	1	0	2	0	0	3	0	2	4	0	13
Nova Scotia (Anslow)	0	1	0	1	0	1	2	0	1	0	0	1	7
