= 1935 Macdonald Brier =

Canadian men's curling championship

- Host city: Toronto, Ontario
- Arena: Granite Curling Club
- Dates: March 5–7
- Winner: Ontario
- Curling club: Thistle CC, Hamilton
- Skip: Gordon M. Campbell
- Third: Donald A. Campbell
- Second: Gordon Coates
- Lead: Duncan A. Campbell

The 1935 Macdonald Brier, the Canadian men's national curling championship, was held from March 5 to 7, 1935 at the Granite Club in Toronto, Ontario.

After placing second in each of the last two Briers, Team Ontario, skipped by Gordon M. Campbell, finally won the Brier Tankard with a round robin record of 6-1. This was Ontario's first ever Brier championship.

New rules were instituted for the 1935 Brier, including a standardized weight for stones (45 pounds), sweeping being restricted between the near hog line and far tee line, and the abandonment of flipping a coin to decide hammer in extra ends.

== Teams ==
The teams are listed as follows:

Alberta	Manitoba	New Brunswick	Northern Ontario
Calgary CC, Calgary Skip: Robert Alexander; Third: Howard Palmer; Second: Cyril Glover; Lead: Walter McLaws	Killarney CC, Killarney Skip: Roy Pritchard; Third: George Ellis; Second: Arthur Boyce; Lead: Mark Teskey	Bathurst CC, Bathurst Skip: Nicholas Thibodeau; Third: Harper Kent; Second: Ed Shirley; Lead: Philip Andrews	Sault Ste. Marie CC, Sault Ste. Marie Skip: James Shaw; Third: Herbert Lash; Second: William Rubenstein; Lead: Frank Elliott
Nova Scotia	Ontario	Quebec	Saskatchewan
Mayflower CC, Halifax Skip: Charles Durrant; Third: Henry McLeod; Second: Cyril Burke; Lead: Frank Arthur	Thistle CC, Hamilton Skip: Gordon M. Campbell; Third: Donald A. Campbell; Second: Gordon Coates; Lead: Duncan A. Campbell	Ormstown CC, Ormstown Skip: William McGerrigle; Third: Arthur Lunan; Second: Clarence McGerrigle; Lead: L.D. Merkley	Nutana CC, Saskatoon Skip: J. S. "Jimmy" Black; Third: Frank Germaine; Second: Sid Peat; Lead: Reginald Fraser

== Round Robin standings ==
Key
Brier champion

Province	Skip	W	L	PF	PA
Ontario	Gordon M. Campbell	6	1	81	49
Alberta	Robert Alexander	5	2	75	69
Manitoba	Roy Pritchard	4	3	82	67
Nova Scotia	Charles Durrant	4	3	75	60
Saskatchewan	J.S. Black	4	3	72	64
Northern Ontario	James Shaw	3	4	58	88
Quebec	William McGerrigle	1	6	54	76
New Brunswick	Nicholas Thibodeau	1	6	62	86

== Round Robin results ==
=== Draw 1 ===
Sheet A	1	2	3	4	5	6	7	8	9	10	11	12	Final
New Brunswick (Thibodeau)	0	1	0	1	2	0	0	1	0	2	0	1	8
Quebec (McGerrigle)	1	0	2	0	0	1	1	0	4	0	1	0	10

Sheet B	1	2	3	4	5	6	7	8	9	10	11	12	Final
Ontario (Campbell)	0	1	1	0	0	3	0	2	2	3	1	0	13
Manitoba (Pritchard)	1	0	0	1	2	0	1	0	0	0	0	1	6

Sheet C	1	2	3	4	5	6	7	8	9	10	11	12	Final
Nova Scotia (Durrant)	0	1	0	2	1	0	3	1	0	0	1	2	11
Saskatchewan (Black)	1	0	1	0	0	1	0	0	1	2	0	0	6

Sheet D	1	2	3	4	5	6	7	8	9	10	11	12	Final
Alberta (Alexander)	0	1	4	0	2	1	1	0	0	0	2	0	11
Northern Ontario (Shaw)	2	0	0	1	0	0	0	3	3	1	0	2	12

=== Draw 2 ===
Sheet A	1	2	3	4	5	6	7	8	9	10	11	12	Final
Quebec (McGerrigle)	1	0	0	0	1	0	1	0	4	0	1	0	8
Alberta (Alexander)	0	1	1	1	0	1	0	1	0	1	0	3	9

Sheet B	1	2	3	4	5	6	7	8	9	10	11	12	Final
Ontario (Campbell)	1	2	4	0	2	1	0	2	0	1	2	3	18
Northern Ontario (Shaw)	0	0	0	4	0	0	1	0	1	0	0	0	6

Sheet C	1	2	3	4	5	6	7	8	9	10	11	12	Final
Manitoba (Pritchard)	0	3	0	1	0	2	1	0	0	2	2	1	12
Saskatchewan (Black)	1	0	3	0	2	0	0	3	4	0	0	0	13

Sheet D	1	2	3	4	5	6	7	8	9	10	11	12	13	Final
New Brunswick (Thibodeau)	0	1	1	0	0	2	0	2	0	1	2	0	0	9
Nova Scotia (Durrant)	1	0	0	1	1	0	2	0	3	0	0	1	1	10

=== Draw 3 ===
Sheet A	1	2	3	4	5	6	7	8	9	10	11	12	Final
Alberta (Alexander)	1	1	0	2	0	1	0	3	0	1	0	1	10
Manitoba (Pritchard)	0	0	1	0	3	0	1	0	2	0	1	0	8

Sheet B	1	2	3	4	5	6	7	8	9	10	11	12	Final
Ontario (Campbell)	1	0	1	0	2	0	0	0	0	3	0	1	8
Nova Scotia (Durrant)	0	1	0	1	0	1	1	1	1	0	1	0	7

Sheet C	1	2	3	4	5	6	7	8	9	10	11	12	Final
Quebec (McGerrigle)	0	1	0	0	0	3	0	2	1	1	1	1	10
Northern Ontario (Shaw)	4	0	1	1	1	0	4	0	0	0	0	0	11

Sheet D	1	2	3	4	5	6	7	8	9	10	11	12	Final
New Brunswick (Thibodeau)	0	0	1	0	2	0	0	4	1	0	0	0	8
Saskatchewan (Black)	1	1	0	1	0	2	2	0	0	1	3	2	13

=== Draw 4 ===
Sheet A	1	2	3	4	5	6	7	8	9	10	11	12	Final
Quebec (McGerrigle)	0	0	1	0	0	0	1	0	1	1	2	0	6
Ontario (Campbell)	0	1	0	2	1	2	0	1	0	0	0	1	8

Sheet B	1	2	3	4	5	6	7	8	9	10	11	12	Final
New Brunswick (Thibodeau)	0	3	0	0	1	2	0	2	2	0	0	3	13
Northern Ontario (Shaw)	1	0	1	2	0	0	2	0	0	1	1	0	8

Sheet C	1	2	3	4	5	6	7	8	9	10	11	12	Final
Alberta (Alexander)	0	2	2	0	2	0	0	3	0	3	0	0	12
Saskatchewan (Black)	0	0	0	2	0	2	1	0	1	0	2	1	9

Sheet D	1	2	3	4	5	6	7	8	9	10	11	12	Final
Manitoba (Pritchard)	0	0	4	0	1	0	2	0	2	1	0	0	10
Nova Scotia (Durrant)	2	1	0	1	0	2	0	1	0	0	1	1	9

=== Draw 5 ===
Sheet A	1	2	3	4	5	6	7	8	9	10	11	12	Final
New Brunswick (Thibodeau)	0	1	0	1	0	1	0	1	0	1	0	1	6
Ontario (Campbell)	4	0	1	0	1	0	2	0	1	0	6	0	15

Sheet B	1	2	3	4	5	6	7	8	9	10	11	12	Final
Quebec (McGerrigle)	1	0	0	3	0	0	0	0	2	0	0	1	7
Manitoba (Pritchard)	0	2	2	0	0	2	1	4	0	1	1	0	13

Sheet C	1	2	3	4	5	6	7	8	9	10	11	12	Final
Saskatchewan (Black)	0	1	1	0	1	0	1	0	0	2	0	1	7
Northern Ontario (Shaw)	2	0	0	2	0	1	0	1	2	0	1	0	9

Sheet D	1	2	3	4	5	6	7	8	9	10	11	12	Final
Nova Scotia (Durrant)	0	1	0	0	0	0	3	0	2	0	0	3	9
Alberta (Alexander)	3	0	1	1	1	2	0	4	0	1	2	0	15

=== Draw 6 ===
Sheet A	1	2	3	4	5	6	7	8	9	10	11	12	Final
Alberta (Alexander)	2	0	2	0	0	3	0	0	1	0	0	0	8
Ontario (Campbell)	0	4	0	4	1	0	1	1	0	2	1	1	15

Sheet B	1	2	3	4	5	6	7	8	9	10	11	12	Final
Saskatchewan (Black)	0	3	2	1	0	0	0	3	2	2	0	1	14
Quebec (McGerrigle)	1	0	0	0	3	0	3	0	0	0	1	0	8

Sheet C	1	2	3	4	5	6	7	8	9	10	11	12	Final
Manitoba (Pritchard)	4	0	4	0	0	0	4	0	2	3	3	0	20
New Brunswick (Thibodeau)	0	1	0	3	0	3	0	1	0	0	0	2	10

Sheet D	1	2	3	4	5	6	7	8	9	10	11	12	Final
Nova Scotia (Durrant)	2	0	2	3	3	0	1	2	1	1	0	1	16
Northern Ontario (Shaw)	0	1	0	0	0	4	0	0	0	0	2	0	7

=== Draw 7 ===
Sheet A	1	2	3	4	5	6	7	8	9	10	11	12	Final
Quebec (McGerrigle)	1	0	0	0	0	3	0	0	0	1	0	0	5
Nova Scotia (Durrant)	0	1	2	1	1	0	2	1	1	0	1	3	13

Sheet B	1	2	3	4	5	6	7	8	9	10	11	12	Final
Alberta (Alexander)	0	0	1	1	2	1	1	0	0	2	0	2	10
New Brunswick (Thibodeau)	1	1	0	0	0	0	0	2	1	0	3	0	8

Sheet C	1	2	3	4	5	6	7	8	9	10	11	12	Final
Ontario (Campbell)	0	0	1	0	0	1	0	0	1	1	0	0	4
Saskatchewan (Black)	1	1	0	2	2	0	1	1	0	0	1	1	10

Sheet D	1	2	3	4	5	6	7	8	9	10	11	12	Final
Manitoba (Pritchard)	1	0	0	0	2	2	0	1	1	2	4	0	13
Northern Ontario (Shaw)	0	1	1	2	0	0	1	0	0	0	0	0	5
