= Lorne Stewart =

Canadian curler

- Curler
- Born: c. 1909
- Died: September 29, 1968 (aged 59); Winnipeg, Manitoba

Team
- Curling club: Strathcona Curling Club
Medal record
Representing Manitoba
Macdonald Brier
Gold medal – first place	1934 Toronto

John Lawrence "Lorne" Stewart (c. 1909 – September 29, 1968) was a Canadian curler. He was the third of the 1934 Brier Champion team (skipped by his Leo Johnson), representing Manitoba.
