= 1951 Macdonald Brier =

Canadian men's curling championship

- Host city: Halifax, Nova Scotia
- Arena: Dalhousie Memorial Arena
- Dates: March 6–10
- Attendance: 17,000
- Winner: Nova Scotia
- Curling club: Kentville CC, Kentville
- Skip: Don Oyler
- Third: George Hanson
- Second: Frederick Dyke
- Lead: Wallace Knock

The 1951 Macdonald Brier, the Canadian men's national curling championship, was held from March 6 to 10, 1951 at Dalhousie Memorial Arena in Halifax, Nova Scotia. A total of 17,000 fans attended the event. This would be the first Brier in which a team from Newfoundland would compete, increasing the field from 10 to 11 teams. This arrangement would last until 1975, when a combined Northwest Territories/Yukon entry was added to the field.

Team Nova Scotia, skipped by Don Oyler, won the Brier Tankard as they finished round robin play unbeaten with a 10–0 record. This was the second time in which Nova Scotia had won the Brier, with their previous title being the inaugural event in 1927. This was the seventh time in which a team finished a Brier undefeated and the first non-Manitoban team to do so. Oyler would quit competitive curling after his Brier championship due to a sore wrist, which affected his delivery.

British Columbia, Manitoba, and Saskatchewan all tied for second with 7-3 records, necessitating a tiebreaker playoff between the three teams for runner-up. British Columbia would ultimately be the runner-up as they defeated Saskatchewan 8–0 in the second tiebreaker game. Saskatchewan defeated Manitoba 9–7 in the first tiebreaker game. This was the last time in the Macdonald era in which there would be a tiebreaker playoff contested for runner-up. After 1951, tiebreaker playoff games would only be played if two or more teams were tied for first place.

British Columbia's win over Saskatchewan in the second tiebreaker was the first game in Brier history in which there was a shutout.

== Teams ==
The teams are listed as follows:

Alberta	British Columbia	Manitoba	New Brunswick
Granite CC, Edmonton Skip: William Gray; Third: Glenn Gray; Second: John Ferry; Lead: Warren Scott	Trail CC, Trail Skip: Alf Chesser; Third: John J. Cameron; Second: Maxwell Gordon; Lead: Harry Rothery	Strathcona CC, Winnipeg Skip: Roy Forsythe; Third: Lorne Stewart; Second: Alixter McDiairmid; Lead: Arthur Meers	Bathurst CC, Bathurst Skip: Nicholas Thibodeau; Third: Huntley Ferguson; Second: Charles McArdle; Lead: John E. Cameron
Newfoundland	Northern Ontario	Nova Scotia	Ontario
St. Johns CC, St. John's Skip: Thomas Hallett; Third: Claude Hall; Second: Frederick Wylie; Lead: Edmund Hiscock	Copper Cliff CC, Copper Cliff Skip: Walter Johnstone; Third: Arnold Boyd; Second: Walter Flowers; Lead: William MacKay	Kentville CC, Kentville Skip: Don Oyler; Third: George Hanson; Second: Frederick Dyke; Lead: Wallace Knock	The Granite Club, Toronto Skip: Gordon Campbell; Third: Stanley Jones; Second: Reginald Mooney; Lead: Colin Campbell
Prince Edward Island	Quebec	Saskatchewan
Charlottetown CC, Charlottetown Skip: Frank Acorn; Third: John Squarebriggs; Second: William MacNeill; Lead: Melvin Jenkins	Sigma CC, Val-d'Or Skip: Merle Thomas; Third: Jean Paul Bonneville; Second: Augustus Peppard; Lead: Albert Randall	Rosetown CC, Rosetown Skip: John Franklin; Third: Clifford Annabel; Second: George Heartwell; Lead: Harold Lloyd

== Round robin standings ==
Key
Brier champion
Teams to tiebreaker playoff

Province	Skip	W	L	PF	PA
Nova Scotia	Don Oyler	10	0	114	60
British Columbia	Alf Chesser	7	3	122	89
Manitoba	Roy Forsythe	7	3	118	98
Saskatchewan	John Franklin	7	3	109	79
Alberta	William Gray	6	4	98	84
Ontario	Gordon Campbell	6	4	94	101
New Brunswick	Nichols Thibodeau	3	7	98	121
Northern Ontario	Walter Johnstone	3	7	90	113
Quebec	Merle Thomas	3	7	92	99
Prince Edward Island	Frank Acorn	2	8	95	120
Newfoundland	Thomas Hallett	1	9	66	132

== Round robin results ==
=== Draw 1 ===
Tuesday, March 6

Sheet A	1	2	3	4	5	6	7	8	9	10	11	12	Final
Alberta (Gray)	0	3	1	0	0	0	0	0	2	0	1	1	8
Northern Ontario (Johnstone)	0	0	0	0	2	1	1	1	0	4	0	0	9

Sheet B	1	2	3	4	5	6	7	8	9	10	11	12	Final
Saskatchewan (Franklin)	0	1	0	0	1	0	1	0	2	3	0	1	9
Nova Scotia (Oyler)	1	0	0	2	0	3	0	4	0	0	1	0	11

Sheet C	1	2	3	4	5	6	7	8	9	10	11	12	Final
British Columbia (Chesser)	0	1	0	2	3	1	3	2	1	0	1	0	14
Newfoundland (Hallett)	3	0	1	0	0	0	0	0	0	1	0	1	6

Sheet D	1	2	3	4	5	6	7	8	9	10	11	12	Final
Manitoba (Forsythe)	2	2	0	2	0	1	0	0	1	1	0	1	10
Quebec (Thomas)	0	0	1	0	3	0	1	2	0	0	2	0	9

Sheet E	1	2	3	4	5	6	7	8	9	10	11	12	Final
Ontario (Campbell)	1	2	0	0	0	0	0	0	1	0	2	2	8
New Brunswick (Thibodeau)	0	0	2	1	3	1	3	1	0	1	0	0	12

=== Draw 2 ===
Tuesday, March 6

Sheet A	1	2	3	4	5	6	7	8	9	10	11	12	Final
New Brunswick (Thibodeau)	0	2	0	2	0	0	2	0	0	1	0	1	8
Alberta (Gray)	2	0	1	0	2	1	0	1	2	0	1	0	10

Sheet B	1	2	3	4	5	6	7	8	9	10	11	12	13	Final
Manitoba (Forsythe)	2	0	1	0	1	0	5	0	3	0	1	0	1	14
Prince Edward Island (Acorn)	0	1	0	2	0	4	0	2	0	2	0	2	0	13

Sheet C	1	2	3	4	5	6	7	8	9	10	11	12	Final
Quebec (Thomas)	0	0	1	0	2	0	1	0	2	0	0	3	9
British Columbia (Chesser)	2	3	0	4	0	2	0	5	0	3	1	0	20

Sheet D	1	2	3	4	5	6	7	8	9	10	11	12	Final
Newfoundland (Hallett)	0	1	0	0	0	0	1	0	1	0	1	1	5
Saskatchewan (Franklin)	2	0	2	2	1	2	0	3	0	3	0	0	15

Sheet E	1	2	3	4	5	6	7	8	9	10	11	12	Final
Ontario (Campbell)	1	1	0	0	0	1	1	1	0	1	0	1	7
Nova Scotia (Oyler)	0	0	2	2	1	0	0	0	1	0	3	0	9

=== Draw 3 ===
Wednesday, March 7

Sheet A	1	2	3	4	5	6	7	8	9	10	11	12	Final
Alberta (Gray)	0	0	2	2	0	1	0	1	0	0	0	0	6
Nova Scotia (Oyler)	2	2	0	0	1	0	2	0	2	1	2	4	16

Sheet B	1	2	3	4	5	6	7	8	9	10	11	12	Final
Quebec (Thomas)	1	0	2	0	0	0	0	0	0	0	1	0	4
Saskatchewan (Franklin)	0	1	0	1	1	1	1	1	1	2	0	1	10

Sheet C	1	2	3	4	5	6	7	8	9	10	11	12	Final
British Columbia (Chesser)	1	2	3	0	0	1	1	2	0	1	1	1	13
Prince Edward Island (Acorn)	0	0	0	1	3	0	0	0	1	0	0	0	5

Sheet D	1	2	3	4	5	6	7	8	9	10	11	12	Final
Ontario (Campbell)	0	4	0	0	0	0	2	2	0	2	2	0	12
Newfoundland (Hallett)	2	0	2	2	1	1	0	0	1	0	0	1	10

Sheet E	1	2	3	4	5	6	7	8	9	10	11	12	13	Final
Northern Ontario (Johnstone)	0	0	1	2	1	0	0	3	1	2	0	0	5	15
New Brunswick (Thibodeau)	1	2	0	0	0	2	1	0	0	0	3	1	0	10

=== Draw 4 ===
Wednesday, March 7

Sheet A	1	2	3	4	5	6	7	8	9	10	11	12	Final
Alberta (Gray)	0	1	1	2	0	0	2	1	1	1	0	2	11
Newfoundland (Hallett)	1	0	0	0	0	3	0	0	0	0	0	0	4

Sheet B	1	2	3	4	5	6	7	8	9	10	11	12	Final
Prince Edward Island (Acorn)	2	0	0	1	0	0	3	0	1	1	3	0	11
Saskatchewan (Franklin)	0	3	1	0	1	2	0	3	0	0	0	3	13

Sheet C	1	2	3	4	5	6	7	8	9	10	11	12	Final
British Columbia (Chesser)	0	0	0	0	2	0	1	0	2	0	3	1	9
Manitoba (Forsythe)	4	1	2	2	0	3	0	1	0	2	0	0	15

Sheet D	1	2	3	4	5	6	7	8	9	10	11	12	Final
Quebec (Thomas)	0	1	1	0	1	0	1	0	1	0	1	1	7
Ontario (Campbell)	1	0	0	2	0	1	0	1	0	3	0	0	8

Sheet E	1	2	3	4	5	6	7	8	9	10	11	12	Final
Nova Scotia (Oyler)	1	0	2	0	0	1	0	4	1	0	0	0	9
Northern Ontario (Johnstone)	0	1	0	1	0	0	1	0	0	1	1	0	5

=== Draw 5 ===
Thursday, March 8

Sheet A	1	2	3	4	5	6	7	8	9	10	11	12	Final
Alberta (Gray)	1	0	0	0	2	0	1	2	0	2	0	1	9
Quebec (Thomas)	0	0	2	1	0	1	0	0	1	0	2	0	7

Sheet B	1	2	3	4	5	6	7	8	9	10	11	12	Final
Saskatchewan (Franklin)	0	1	0	1	0	2	2	0	1	1	1	1	10
Manitoba (Forsythe)	1	0	3	0	1	0	0	3	0	0	0	0	8

Sheet C	1	2	3	4	5	6	7	8	9	10	11	12	Final
Newfoundland (Hallett)	2	0	0	0	1	2	2	2	0	2	0	1	12
Northern Ontario (Johnstone)	0	3	1	4	0	0	0	0	1	0	1	0	10

Sheet D	1	2	3	4	5	6	7	8	9	10	11	12	Final
New Brunswick (Thibodeau)	1	1	0	0	1	0	0	0	0	1	0	X	4
Nova Scotia (Oyler)	0	0	2	2	0	1	1	1	2	0	4	X	13

Sheet E	1	2	3	4	5	6	7	8	9	10	11	12	Final
Prince Edward Island (Acorn)	1	0	4	0	0	2	2	0	0	1	0	2	12
Ontario (Campbell)	0	1	0	4	2	0	0	4	2	0	0	0	13

=== Draw 6 ===
Thursday, March 8

Sheet A	1	2	3	4	5	6	7	8	9	10	11	12	Final
Prince Edward Island (Acorn)	0	0	0	2	0	1	0	0	2	0	0	1	6
Alberta (Gray)	2	1	1	0	1	0	2	1	0	2	2	0	12

Sheet B	1	2	3	4	5	6	7	8	9	10	11	12	Final
Manitoba (Forsythe)	1	1	0	2	1	0	1	0	0	4	0	0	10
Ontario (Campbell)	0	0	2	0	0	1	0	1	1	0	2	1	8

Sheet C	1	2	3	4	5	6	7	8	9	10	11	12	Final
Northern Ontario (Johnstone)	0	1	0	0	1	0	0	3	0	1	1	0	7
Quebec (Thomas)	2	0	0	1	0	5	1	0	1	0	0	4	14

Sheet D	1	2	3	4	5	6	7	8	9	10	11	12	Final
Saskatchewan (Franklin)	0	0	3	1	0	1	1	0	1	0	0	0	7
British Columbia (Chesser)	1	3	0	0	2	0	0	2	0	2	1	1	12

Sheet E	1	2	3	4	5	6	7	8	9	10	11	12	Final
New Brunswick (Thibodeau)	0	1	0	1	3	0	2	0	2	1	1	4	15
Newfoundland (Hallett)	1	0	3	0	0	2	0	1	0	0	0	0	7

=== Draw 7 ===
Friday, March 9

Sheet A	1	2	3	4	5	6	7	8	9	10	11	12	Final
Alberta (Gray)	1	3	1	2	1	0	1	1	0	2	0	0	12
Manitoba (Forsythe)	0	0	0	0	0	3	0	0	1	0	2	1	7

Sheet B	1	2	3	4	5	6	7	8	9	10	11	12	Final
Northern Ontario (Johnstone)	0	0	3	0	1	3	1	1	0	2	0	1	12
Prince Edward Island (Acorn)	2	1	0	1	0	0	0	0	4	0	2	0	10

Sheet C	1	2	3	4	5	6	7	8	9	10	11	12	Final
Nova Scotia (Oyler)	2	1	1	1	0	2	0	0	2	2	0	1	12
Newfoundland (Hallett)	0	0	0	0	1	0	1	1	0	0	1	0	4

Sheet D	1	2	3	4	5	6	7	8	9	10	11	12	Final
New Brunswick (Thibodeau)	0	2	0	4	0	1	0	3	3	0	1	1	15
Quebec (Thomas)	3	0	1	0	1	0	2	0	0	2	0	0	9

Sheet E	1	2	3	4	5	6	7	8	9	10	11	12	Final
British Columbia (Chesser)	1	0	0	4	0	2	1	0	1	0	1	0	10
Ontario (Campbell)	0	2	1	0	4	0	0	2	0	2	0	0	11

=== Draw 8 ===
Friday, March 9

Sheet A	1	2	3	4	5	6	7	8	9	10	11	12	Final
British Columbia (Chesser)	0	0	4	0	0	3	1	0	4	0	1	0	13
Alberta (Gray)	0	2	0	1	1	0	0	2	0	1	0	4	11

Sheet B	1	2	3	4	5	6	7	8	9	10	11	12	Final
Manitoba (Forsythe)	0	1	3	0	2	0	0	0	5	0	3	0	14
Northern Ontario (Johnstone)	1	0	0	1	0	0	1	2	0	1	0	1	7

Sheet C	1	2	3	4	5	6	7	8	9	10	11	12	Final
Quebec (Thomas)	0	0	1	0	1	1	0	0	3	0	0	0	6
Nova Scotia (Oyler)	2	2	0	1	0	0	0	1	0	1	0	1	8

Sheet D	1	2	3	4	5	6	7	8	9	10	11	12	Final
Prince Edward Island (Acorn)	0	1	1	2	0	3	0	2	0	0	3	0	12
New Brunswick (Thibodeau)	1	0	0	0	4	0	2	0	1	2	0	1	11

Sheet E	1	2	3	4	5	6	7	8	9	10	11	12	Final
Ontario (Campbell)	1	0	0	0	1	0	0	2	0	3	1	1	9
Saskatchewan (Franklin)	0	1	3	1	0	1	1	0	1	0	0	0	8

=== Draw 9 ===
Friday, March 9

Sheet A	1	2	3	4	5	6	7	8	9	10	11	12	Final
Saskatchewan (Franklin)	0	1	1	2	0	1	0	0	1	0	1	0	7
Alberta (Gray)	1	0	0	0	1	0	2	0	0	1	0	1	6

Sheet B	1	2	3	4	5	6	7	8	9	10	11	12	Final
Nova Scotia (Oyler)	2	0	4	0	1	1	1	0	3	0	2	0	14
Prince Edward Island (Acorn)	0	1	0	1	0	0	0	2	0	1	0	2	7

Sheet C	1	2	3	4	5	6	7	8	9	10	11	12	Final
New Brunswick (Thibodeau)	0	2	1	2	0	0	1	0	0	3	0	1	10
Manitoba (Forsythe)	2	0	0	0	1	4	0	5	2	0	2	0	16

Sheet D	1	2	3	4	5	6	7	8	9	10	11	12	Final
Newfoundland (Hallett)	0	0	0	0	2	0	0	2	0	0	0	1	5
Quebec (Thomas)	1	1	2	2	0	1	2	0	3	1	1	0	14

Sheet E	1	2	3	4	5	6	7	8	9	10	11	12	Final
Northern Ontario (Johnstone)	0	2	1	0	0	1	0	2	0	1	2	0	9
British Columbia (Chesser)	6	0	0	1	2	0	1	0	1	0	0	1	12

=== Draw 10 ===
Saturday, March 10

Sheet A	1	2	3	4	5	6	7	8	9	10	11	12	Final
Ontario (Campbell)	0	1	1	0	0	0	0	3	0	1	1	0	7
Alberta (Gray)	2	0	0	2	1	2	1	0	4	0	0	1	13

Sheet B	1	2	3	4	5	6	7	8	9	10	11	12	Final
Northern Ontario (Johnstone)	0	1	0	2	0	0	1	0	1	0	1	0	6
Saskatchewan (Franklin)	3	0	2	0	0	1	0	2	0	3	0	2	13

Sheet C	1	2	3	4	5	6	7	8	9	10	11	12	Final
British Columbia (Chesser)	1	0	1	0	4	3	0	1	1	3	0	X	14
New Brunswick (Thibodeau)	0	1	0	2	0	0	2	0	0	0	1	X	6

Sheet D	1	2	3	4	5	6	7	8	9	10	11	12	Final
Manitoba (Forsythe)	1	0	1	0	1	0	1	1	0	0	2	X	7
Nova Scotia (Oyler)	0	3	0	2	0	2	0	0	3	2	0	X	12

Sheet E	1	2	3	4	5	6	7	8	9	10	11	12	Final
Newfoundland (Hallett)	0	0	1	0	0	3	0	0	1	0	0	0	5
Prince Edward Island (Acorn)	1	1	0	1	1	0	1	1	0	1	3	2	12

=== Draw 11 ===
Saturday, March 10

Sheet A	1	2	3	4	5	6	7	8	9	10	11	12	Final
Prince Edward Island (Acorn)	0	0	0	3	0	0	1	2	1	0	0	0	7
Quebec (Thomas)	1	1	1	0	2	3	0	0	0	2	3	0	13

Sheet B	1	2	3	4	5	6	7	8	9	10	11	12	Final
Newfoundland (Hallett)	3	0	1	0	0	0	1	0	1	0	1	1	8
Manitoba (Forsythe)	0	1	0	5	3	1	0	5	0	2	0	0	17

Sheet C	1	2	3	4	5	6	7	8	9	10	11	12	Final
Nova Scotia (Oyler)	1	0	0	2	0	1	0	2	1	0	1	2	10
British Columbia (Chesser)	0	0	1	0	1	0	1	0	0	2	0	0	5

Sheet D	1	2	3	4	5	6	7	8	9	10	11	12	Final
New Brunswick (Thibodeau)	1	1	0	0	3	0	0	0	1	0	1	0	7
Saskatchewan (Franklin)	0	0	1	5	0	2	4	0	0	4	0	1	17

Sheet E	1	2	3	4	5	6	7	8	9	10	11	12	Final
Ontario (Campbell)	0	1	0	1	2	0	2	1	0	3	0	1	11
Northern Ontario (Johnstone)	0	0	2	0	0	4	0	0	3	0	1	0	10

== Playoff ==
Tiebreaker #1		Tiebreaker #2
		British Columbia	8
Saskatchewan	9	Saskatchewan	0
Manitoba	7

=== Tiebreaker #1 ===
Saturday, March 10

Sheet C	1	2	3	4	5	6	7	8	9	10	11	12	Final
Saskatchewan (Franklin)	0	0	0	2	0	1	2	1	0	2	0	1	9
Manitoba (Forsythe)	0	0	2	0	2	0	0	0	2	0	1	0	7

=== Tiebreaker #2 ===
Saturday, March 10

Sheet C	1	2	3	4	5	6	7	8	9	10	11	12	Final
British Columbia (Chesser)	0	0	2	1	1	1	1	2	X	X	X	X	8
Saskatchewan (Franklin)	0	0	0	0	0	0	0	0	X	X	X	X	0
