= Don Oyler =

Canadian curler (1907–1989)

- Curler
- Born: March 8, 1907; Kentville, Nova Scotia
- Died: September 19, 1989 (aged 82); Halifax, Nova Scotia

Team
- Curling club: Kentville Curling Club
Medal record
Representing Nova Scotia
Macdonald Brier
Gold medal – first place	1951 Halifax

Herbert Donald Oyler (March 8, 1907 – September 19, 1989) was a Canadian curler. He was the skip of the 1951 Brier Champion team, representing Nova Scotia. It was the first time a team went undefeated at the Brier.

Oyler did not curl competitively after winning the 1951 Brier due to a sore wrist, which affected his delivery.
