= Leo Johnson (curler) =

Canadian curler

- Curler
- Born: June 12, 1901; Winnipeg, Manitoba
- Died: March 6, 1976 (aged 74); Winnipeg, Manitoba

Team
- Curling club: Strathcona Curling Club
Medal record
Representing Manitoba
Macdonald Brier
Gold medal – first place	1934 Toronto
Bronze medal – third place	1946 Saskatoon

Leo Einer Johnson (June 12, 1901 – March 6, 1976) was a Canadian curler. He was the skip of the 1934 Brier Champion team, representing Manitoba.
