= Darryl Gunnlaugson =

Canadian curler

- Curler ♂

Team
- Curling club: Charleswood Curling Club, Winnipeg, Manitoba, Canada

Curling career
- Member Association: Manitoba
- Brier: 2: (1996, 2000)
- World Championship: 1 (1996)
Medal record
Curling
Representing Canada
World Championships
Gold medal – first place	1996 Hamilton
Representing Manitoba
Tim Hortons Brier
Gold medal – first place	1996 Kamloops

Darryl Gunnlaugson is a Canadian curler.

He is a 1996 World Men's champion and a 1996 Labatt Brier champion.

== Teams ==
Season	Skip	Third	Second	Lead	Alternate	Events
1994–95	Jeff Stoughton	Jeff Ryan	Garry Vandenberghe	Darryl Gunnlaugson		
1995–96	Jeff Stoughton	Ken Tresoor	Garry Vandenberghe	Steve Gould	Darryl Gunnlaugson	Brier 1996 (gold); WCC 1996 (gold)
1999–00	Jeff Stoughton	Jon Mead	Garry Van Den Berghe	Doug Armstrong	Darryl Gunnlaugson	Brier 2000 (4th)
2006–07	Craig White	Harold Mauthe	Darryl Gunnlaugson	Marty Johanason		
2007–08	Nathan Asham	Arnold Asham	Sean McCutcheon	Darryl Gunnlaugson		
2013–14	Darryl Gunnlaugson	Jamie Hay	Gary Gumprich	Kyle Halford		
2015–16	Doug Harrison	Jamie Hay	Darryl Gunnlaugson	Larry Borus		2016 Viterra Championship
2016–17	Mark Franklin	Brent McCannell	Darryl Gunnlaugson	Terry Aseltine		

== Personal life ==
Gunnlaugson comes from an accomplished curling family. His father Lloyd represented Manitoba at the 1983 Labatt Brier. His son Jason is also an accomplished curler and his brother in-law Garry Vandenberghe is a World champion.
