= 1996 Labatt Brier =

- Host city: Kamloops, British Columbia
- Arena: Riverside Coliseum
- Attendance: 127,746
- Winner: Manitoba
- Curling club: Charleswood CC, Winnipeg
- Skip: Jeff Stoughton
- Third: Ken Tresoor
- Second: Garry Van Den Berghe
- Lead: Steve Gould
- Alternate: Darryl Gunnlaugson
- Finalist: Alberta (Kevin Martin)

The 1996 Labatt Brier was held at the Riverside Coliseum in Kamloops, British Columbia. Prince Edward Island defeated Newfoundland in a tie-breaker to win the 4th seed in the playoffs. Jeff Stoughton of Manitoba defeated Kevin Martin of Alberta through extra ends, stealing one in the 11th end to win 8-7.

== Teams ==
Alberta	British Columbia	Manitoba
Ottewell CC, Edmonton Skip: Kevin Martin; Third: Don Walchuk; Second: Shawn Broda; Lead: Don Bartlett; Fifth: Jules Owchar	Kamloops CC, Kamloops Skip: Barry McPhee; Third: Tony Eberts; Second: Ken Brown; Lead: Bert Hinch; Fifth: Eric Wiltzen	Charleswood CC, Winnipeg Skip: Jeff Stoughton; Third: Ken Tresoor; Second: Garry Van Den Berghe; Lead: Steve Gould; Fifth: Darryl Gunnlaugson
New Brunswick	Newfoundland	Northern Ontario
Beaver CC, Moncton Skip: Mike Kennedy; Third: Grant Odishaw; Second: Marc Lecocq; Lead: Rick Perron; Fifth: Roger Nason	St. John's CC, St. John's Skip: Frank O'Driscoll; Third: Rick Rowsell; Second: Peter Hollett; Lead: Craig Dowden; Fifth: Ian Kerr	McIntyre CC, Timmins Skip: David MacInnes; Third: Jeffrey Henderson; Second: Marc Butler; Lead: Will Gubbels; Fifth: Ed Richter
Nova Scotia	Ontario	Prince Edward Island
Bridgewater CC, Bridgewater Skip: Brian Rafuse; Third: Curt Palmer; Second: David Slauenwhite; Lead: Glenn Josephson; Fifth: Mike Vissers	Ridgetown CC, Ridgetown Skip: Bob Ingram; Third: Larry Smyth; Second: Robert Rumfeldt; Lead: James Brackett; Fifth: Robert McKinlay	Silver Fox CC, Summerside Skip: Peter MacDonald; Third: Grant Somers; Second: John Postma; Lead: Rod MacDonald; Fifth: Mark O'Rourke
Quebec	Saskatchewan	Yukon/Northwest Territories
Buckingham CC, Buckingham Skip: Don Westphal; Third: Daniel Lemery; Second: Louis Biron; Lead: Pierre Charette; Fifth: Daniel Lafleur	Hillcrest CC, Moose Jaw Skip: Rod Montgomery; Third: Glen Despins; Second: Dwayne Mihalicz; Lead: Sandy Forsyth; Fifth: Mark Lang	Yellowknife CC, Yellowknife Skip: Richard Robertson; Third: Derek Elkin; Second: Steve Van Dine; Lead: Ron Delmage; Fifth: Bill Strain

== Map of teams ==
Provincial Winners

== Round-robin standings ==
Key
Teams to Playoffs
Teams to Tiebreaker

Province	Skip	W	L
Alberta	Kevin Martin	10	1
Manitoba	Jeff Stoughton	9	2
Quebec	Don Westphal	8	3
Prince Edward Island	Peter MacDonald	6	5
Newfoundland	Frank O'Driscoll	6	5
New Brunswick	Mike Kennedy	5	6
Saskatchewan	Rod Montgomery	5	6
Nova Scotia	Brian Rafuse	5	6
British Columbia	Barry McPhee	4	7
Ontario	Bob Ingram	4	7
Northern Ontario	David MacInnes	3	8
Northwest Territories/Yukon	Richard Robertson	1	10

== Round-robin results ==
=== Draw 1 ===
Sheet A	1	2	3	4	5	6	7	8	9	10	Final
Quebec (Westphal) 🔨	0	2	0	0	1	0	1	1	0	1	6
Manitoba (Stoughton)	0	0	1	1	0	1	0	0	2	0	5

Sheet B	1	2	3	4	5	6	7	8	9	10	Final
Ontario (Ingram) 🔨	0	0	0	1	0	1	0	0	0	X	2
British Columbia (McPhee)	0	0	0	0	2	0	2	0	1	X	5

Sheet C	1	2	3	4	5	6	7	8	9	10	Final
Newfoundland (O'Driscoll) 🔨	0	3	0	0	2	0	1	1	1	X	8
Nova Scotia (Rafuse)	1	0	1	0	0	1	0	0	0	X	3

Sheet D	1	2	3	4	5	6	7	8	9	10	Final
Yukon/Northwest Territories (Robertson) 🔨	0	0	0	0	1	0	2	0	3	1	7
Northern Ontario (MacInnes)	0	1	0	1	0	2	0	1	0	0	5

=== Draw 2 ===
Sheet A	1	2	3	4	5	6	7	8	9	10	Final
Nova Scotia (Rafuse) 🔨	1	0	0	2	0	1	0	0	0	1	5
Ontario (Ingram)	0	0	1	0	1	0	1	1	0	0	4

Sheet B	1	2	3	4	5	6	7	8	9	10	11	Final
Saskatchewan (Montgomery) 🔨	1	0	0	0	1	0	0	1	1	0	1	5
New Brunswick (Kennedy)	0	1	0	0	0	1	1	0	0	1	0	4

Sheet C	1	2	3	4	5	6	7	8	9	10	Final
Prince Edward Island (MacDonald) 🔨	1	0	1	0	0	1	0	2	0	X	5
Alberta (Martin)	0	2	0	3	0	0	2	0	2	X	9

Sheet D	1	2	3	4	5	6	7	8	9	10	11	Final
British Columbia (McPhee) 🔨	1	0	0	2	0	1	0	2	0	0	1	7
Quebec (Westphal)	0	2	0	0	1	0	2	0	0	1	0	6

=== Draw 3 ===
Sheet B	1	2	3	4	5	6	7	8	9	10	Final
Quebec (Westphal) 🔨	0	3	0	3	0	3	0	3	X	X	12
Prince Edward Island (MacDonald)	1	0	2	0	2	0	1	0	X	X	6

Sheet C	1	2	3	4	5	6	7	8	9	10	Final
New Brunswick (Kennedy) 🔨	1	0	1	1	0	2	1	0	0	1	7
Yukon/Northwest Territories (Robertson)	0	1	0	0	2	0	0	1	1	0	5

=== Draw 4 ===
Sheet A	1	2	3	4	5	6	7	8	9	10	Final
Northern Ontario (MacInnes) 🔨	1	0	0	1	0	0	2	0	0	X	4
Newfoundland (O'Driscoll)	0	1	0	0	1	3	0	1	1	X	7

Sheet B	1	2	3	4	5	6	7	8	9	10	Final
Alberta (Martin) 🔨	2	0	2	0	2	0	1	0	0	X	7
Saskatchewan (Montgomery)	0	1	0	1	0	1	0	1	0	X	4

Sheet C	1	2	3	4	5	6	7	8	9	10	Final
Ontario (Ingram) 🔨	1	0	2	0	1	0	0	0	3	0	7
Manitoba (Stoughton)	0	1	0	1	0	4	0	1	0	1	8

Sheet D	1	2	3	4	5	6	7	8	9	10	Final
Prince Edward Island (MacDonald) 🔨	1	0	1	0	2	0	2	0	1	X	7
New Brunswick (Kennedy)	0	2	0	1	0	3	0	5	0	X	11

=== Draw 5 ===
Sheet A	1	2	3	4	5	6	7	8	9	10	Final
Manitoba (Stoughton) 🔨	0	3	0	1	0	1	0	0	1	1	7
Alberta (Martin)	0	0	1	0	3	0	1	1	0	0	6

Sheet B	1	2	3	4	5	6	7	8	9	10	Final
Yukon/Northwest Territories (Robertson) 🔨	0	1	0	2	0	0	0	1	X	X	4
Nova Scotia (Rafuse)	0	0	2	0	4	1	2	0	X	X	9

Sheet C	1	2	3	4	5	6	7	8	9	10	Final
Saskatchewan (Montgomery) 🔨	1	2	0	0	2	0	2	2	X	X	9
Northern Ontario (MacInnes)	0	0	2	0	0	1	0	0	X	X	3

Sheet D	1	2	3	4	5	6	7	8	9	10	Final
Newfoundland (O'Driscoll) 🔨	1	0	2	0	0	2	0	2	0	X	7
British Columbia (McPhee)	0	1	0	1	1	0	1	0	0	X	4

=== Draw 6 ===
Sheet A	1	2	3	4	5	6	7	8	9	10	Final
Saskatchewan (Montgomery) 🔨	1	0	1	0	1	0	2	0	2	0	7
Nova Scotia (Rafuse)	0	2	0	3	0	1	0	3	0	1	10

Sheet B	1	2	3	4	5	6	7	8	9	10	Final
Newfoundland (O'Driscoll) 🔨	0	1	0	0	2	1	0	0	X	X	4
Manitoba (Stoughton)	2	0	4	1	0	0	2	1	X	X	10

Sheet C	1	2	3	4	5	6	7	8	9	10	Final
British Columbia (McPhee) 🔨	0	3	0	0	0	0	0	2	0	X	5
Alberta (Martin)	1	0	2	0	1	3	0	0	2	X	9

Sheet D	1	2	3	4	5	6	7	8	9	10	Final
Northern Ontario (MacInnes) 🔨	2	0	2	0	1	0	0	0	1	X	6
Ontario (Ingram)	0	1	0	2	0	3	1	1	0	X	8

=== Draw 7 ===
Sheet A	1	2	3	4	5	6	7	8	9	10	Final
Ontario (Ingram) 🔨	1	0	0	3	0	1	0	0	1	0	6
Prince Edward Island (MacDonald)	0	0	1	0	3	0	1	0	0	2	7

Sheet B	1	2	3	4	5	6	7	8	9	10	Final
Manitoba (Stoughton) 🔨	2	0	0	1	1	0	1	1	1	X	7
New Brunswick (Kennedy)	0	1	0	0	0	2	0	0	0	X	3

Sheet C	1	2	3	4	5	6	7	8	9	10	Final
Yukon/Northwest Territories (Robertson) 🔨	0	0	0	0	1	0	2	0	X	X	3
British Columbia (McPhee)	0	2	0	2	0	3	0	3	X	X	10

Sheet D	1	2	3	4	5	6	7	8	9	10	Final
Nova Scotia (Rafuse) 🔨	2	0	2	0	0	0	1	0	1	0	6
Quebec (Westphal)	0	1	0	2	1	1	0	0	0	2	7

=== Draw 8 ===
Sheet A	1	2	3	4	5	6	7	8	9	10	Final
Alberta (Martin) 🔨	2	1	0	3	0	2	0	0	3	X	11
Yukon/Northwest Territories (Robertson)	0	0	2	0	2	0	2	0	0	X	6

Sheet B	1	2	3	4	5	6	7	8	9	10	Final
Prince Edward Island (MacDonald) 🔨	1	0	2	0	1	2	0	2	X	X	8
Northern Ontario (MacInnes)	0	1	0	1	0	0	1	0	X	X	3

Sheet C	1	2	3	4	5	6	7	8	9	10	11	Final
New Brunswick (Kennedy) 🔨	3	0	0	1	0	2	0	1	0	1	0	8
Newfoundland (O'Driscoll)	0	2	1	0	2	0	1	0	2	0	1	9

Sheet D	1	2	3	4	5	6	7	8	9	10	Final
Quebec (Westphal) 🔨	2	0	0	0	2	0	1	0	2	X	7
Saskatchewan (Montgomery)	0	1	1	0	0	2	0	1	0	X	5

=== Draw 9 ===
Sheet A	1	2	3	4	5	6	7	8	9	10	Final
British Columbia (McPhee) 🔨	1	0	1	0	0	2	0	1	0	1	6
New Brunswick (Kennedy)	0	1	0	1	1	0	0	0	1	0	4

Sheet B	1	2	3	4	5	6	7	8	9	10	Final
Yukon/Northwest Territories (Robertson) 🔨	0	0	0	0	0	X	X	X	X	X	0
Manitoba (Stoughton)	1	0	2	4	3	X	X	X	X	X	10

Sheet C	1	2	3	4	5	6	7	8	9	10	Final
Prince Edward Island (MacDonald) 🔨	1	0	2	2	1	0	2	0	1	X	9
Nova Scotia (Rafuse)	0	1	0	0	0	3	0	2	0	X	6

Sheet D	1	2	3	4	5	6	7	8	9	10	Final
Alberta (Martin) 🔨	1	0	0	1	1	0	1	0	0	X	4
Newfoundland (O'Driscoll)	0	0	0	0	0	1	0	0	0	X	1

=== Draw 10 ===
Sheet A	1	2	3	4	5	6	7	8	9	10	Final
Newfoundland (O'Driscoll) 🔨	1	1	0	0	1	0	0	2	0	0	5
Prince Edward Island (MacDonald)	0	0	2	0	0	1	1	0	2	2	8

Sheet B	1	2	3	4	5	6	7	8	9	10	Final
Nova Scotia (Rafuse) 🔨	1	0	1	0	1	1	0	0	1	0	5
Alberta (Martin)	0	2	0	2	0	0	1	0	0	1	6

Sheet C	1	2	3	4	5	6	7	8	9	10	Final
Northern Ontario (MacInnes) 🔨	2	0	1	3	0	0	1	0	0	1	8
Quebec (Westphal)	0	2	0	0	1	3	0	1	0	0	7

Sheet D	1	2	3	4	5	6	7	8	9	10	Final
Ontario (Ingram) 🔨	1	1	0	3	1	0	2	0	3	X	11
Saskatchewan (Montgomery)	0	0	1	0	0	2	0	2	0	X	5

=== Draw 11 ===
Sheet A	1	2	3	4	5	6	7	8	9	10	11	Final
Saskatchewan (Montgomery) 🔨	0	0	0	1	0	0	1	0	2	1	1	6
British Columbia (McPhee)	0	1	0	0	1	1	0	2	0	0	0	5

Sheet B	1	2	3	4	5	6	7	8	9	10	Final
New Brunswick (Kennedy) 🔨	2	1	0	0	2	0	1	0	0	0	6
Ontario (Ingram)	0	0	2	0	0	1	0	1	1	0	5

Sheet C	1	2	3	4	5	6	7	8	9	10	Final
Manitoba (Stoughton) 🔨	0	0	2	0	1	0	0	3	0	0	6
Northern Ontario (MacInnes)	0	0	0	3	0	1	1	0	2	1	8

Sheet D	1	2	3	4	5	6	7	8	9	10	Final
Quebec (Westphal) 🔨	2	0	0	1	0	0	0	2	0	1	6
Yukon/Northwest Territories (Robertson)	0	0	0	0	1	1	2	0	1	0	5

=== Draw 12 ===
Sheet A	1	2	3	4	5	6	7	8	9	10	Final
New Brunswick (Kennedy) 🔨	1	0	1	0	0	1	0	0	2	0	5
Quebec (Westphal)	0	1	0	1	2	0	1	1	0	1	7

Sheet B	1	2	3	4	5	6	7	8	9	10	Final
British Columbia (McPhee) 🔨	1	0	0	2	0	1	0	0	1	0	5
Northern Ontario (MacInnes)	0	0	1	0	2	0	0	1	0	2	6

Sheet C	1	2	3	4	5	6	7	8	9	10	Final
Alberta (Martin) 🔨	0	1	0	2	0	1	0	1	2	X	7
Ontario (Ingram)	0	0	1	0	1	0	1	0	0	X	3

Sheet D	1	2	3	4	5	6	7	8	9	10	Final
Saskatchewan (Montgomery) 🔨	0	0	1	0	1	0	2	1	0	0	5
Manitoba (Stoughton)	1	1	0	2	0	2	0	0	0	1	7

=== Draw 13 ===
Sheet A	1	2	3	4	5	6	7	8	9	10	Final
Yukon/Northwest Territories (Robertson) 🔨	1	0	0	1	1	0	3	0	0	0	6
Prince Edward Island (MacDonald)	0	1	0	0	0	1	0	3	1	1	7

Sheet B	1	2	3	4	5	6	7	8	9	10	Final
Newfoundland (O'Driscoll) 🔨	1	1	1	0	2	0	4	X	X	X	9
Saskatchewan (Montgomery)	0	0	0	2	0	1	0	X	X	X	3

Sheet C	1	2	3	4	5	6	7	8	9	10	11	Final
Nova Scotia (Rafuse) 🔨	0	1	0	0	1	0	1	0	0	1	0	4
New Brunswick (Kennedy)	0	0	1	1	0	0	0	2	0	0	2	6

Sheet D	1	2	3	4	5	6	7	8	9	10	Final
Northern Ontario (MacInnes) 🔨	0	0	1	0	1	1	0	0	0	X	3
Alberta (Martin)	0	1	0	2	0	0	2	0	3	X	8

=== Draw 14 ===
Sheet A	1	2	3	4	5	6	7	8	9	10	Final
Ontario (Ingram) 🔨	0	0	1	0	2	0	4	0	0	X	7
Yukon/Northwest Territories (Robertson)	0	0	0	2	0	0	0	1	1	X	4

Sheet B	1	2	3	4	5	6	7	8	9	10	Final
Prince Edward Island (MacDonald) 🔨	0	0	4	0	2	0	2	0	0	X	8
British Columbia (McPhee)	0	0	0	1	0	1	0	2	1	X	5

Sheet C	1	2	3	4	5	6	7	8	9	10	Final
Quebec (Westphal) 🔨	0	1	0	2	1	0	2	1	1	1	9
Newfoundland (O'Driscoll)	1	0	3	0	0	2	0	0	0	0	6

Sheet D	1	2	3	4	5	6	7	8	9	10	Final
Manitoba (Stoughton) 🔨	0	0	2	0	0	1	1	2	0	X	6
Nova Scotia (Rafuse)	0	0	0	2	0	0	0	0	1	X	3

=== Draw 15 ===
Sheet A	1	2	3	4	5	6	7	8	9	10	Final
Nova Scotia (Rafuse) 🔨	1	0	0	1	0	1	2	0	2	0	7
Northern Ontario (MacInnes)	0	0	1	0	2	0	0	1	0	0	4

Sheet B	1	2	3	4	5	6	7	8	9	10	Final
Quebec (Westphal) 🔨	2	1	0	0	1	0	4	0	0	1	9
Ontario (Ingram)	0	0	1	2	0	1	0	0	2	0	6

Sheet C	1	2	3	4	5	6	7	8	9	10	Final
Saskatchewan (Montgomery) 🔨	0	1	0	0	1	1	0	1	0	1	5
Prince Edward Island (MacDonald)	0	0	2	0	0	0	1	0	1	0	4

Sheet D	1	2	3	4	5	6	7	8	9	10	Final
Newfoundland (O'Driscoll) 🔨	0	2	0	0	0	2	0	3	0	X	7
Yukon/Northwest Territories (Robertson)	0	0	0	0	1	0	1	0	1	X	3

=== Draw 16 ===
Sheet A	1	2	3	4	5	6	7	8	9	10	Final
Manitoba (Stoughton) 🔨	2	0	2	0	0	0	2	0	0	2	8
British Columbia (McPhee)	0	1	0	0	1	0	0	3	1	0	6

Sheet B	1	2	3	4	5	6	7	8	9	10	Final
Alberta (Martin) 🔨	1	0	3	0	3	0	X	X	X	X	7
Quebec (Westphal)	0	0	0	1	0	1	X	X	X	X	2

Sheet C	1	2	3	4	5	6	7	8	9	10	11	Final
Yukon/Northwest Territories (Robertson) 🔨	0	1	0	3	0	0	1	0	0	2	0	7
Saskatchewan (Montgomery)	0	0	1	0	2	1	0	2	1	0	2	9

Sheet D	1	2	3	4	5	6	7	8	9	10	Final
Northern Ontario (MacInnes) 🔨	2	0	1	0	2	0	1	2	0	0	8
New Brunswick (Kennedy)	0	2	0	1	0	2	0	0	2	3	10

=== Draw 17 ===
Sheet A	1	2	3	4	5	6	7	8	9	10	Final
New Brunswick (Kennedy) 🔨	1	0	1	0	1	0	0	0	2	X	5
Alberta (Martin)	0	2	0	2	0	0	2	0	0	X	6

Sheet B	1	2	3	4	5	6	7	8	9	10	Final
Ontario (Ingram) 🔨	2	0	0	2	0	0	1	0	0	2	7
Newfoundland (O'Driscoll)	0	2	0	0	1	1	0	1	1	0	6

Sheet C	1	2	3	4	5	6	7	8	9	10	11	Final
British Columbia (McPhee) 🔨	1	0	2	0	2	0	1	0	1	1	0	8
Nova Scotia (Rafuse)	0	2	0	1	0	1	0	4	0	0	1	9

Sheet D	1	2	3	4	5	6	7	8	9	10	Final
Prince Edward Island (MacDonald) 🔨	0	0	0	2	0	1	0	1	0	X	4
Manitoba (Stoughton)	2	1	1	0	2	0	0	0	1	X	7

== Tiebreaker ==
Sheet C	1	2	3	4	5	6	7	8	9	10	Final
Prince Edward Island (MacDonald) 🔨	1	0	1	0	3	1	0	3	1	X	10
Newfoundland (O'Driscoll)	0	2	0	2	0	0	2	0	0	X	6

Player percentages
Prince Edward Island		Newfoundland	
Rod MacDonald	77%	Craig Dowden	86%
John Postma	83%	Peter Hollett	83%
Grant Somers	81%	Rick Rowsell	73%
Peter MacDonald	94%	Frank O'Driscoll	70%
Total	84%	Total	78%

== Playoffs ==
Page playoffs
1	Alberta	5
2	Manitoba	6
3	Quebec	7
4	Prince Edward Island	4

Semifinal
1	Alberta	9
3	Quebec	8

Final
2	Manitoba	8
1	Alberta	7

=== 3 vs. 4 ===
Sheet B	1	2	3	4	5	6	7	8	9	10	Final
Quebec (Westphal) 🔨	0	2	2	0	0	2	0	0	1	X	7
Prince Edward Island (MacDonald)	1	0	0	0	2	0	1	0	0	X	4

Player percentages
Quebec		Prince Edward Island	
Pierre Charette	78%	Rod MacDonald	85%
Louis Biron	69%	John Postma	66%
Daniel Lemery	83%	Grant Somers	79%
Don Westphal	71%	Peter MacDonald	68%
Total	75%	Total	75%

=== 1 vs. 2 ===
Sheet B	1	2	3	4	5	6	7	8	9	10	Final
Alberta (Martin) 🔨	1	0	0	1	0	0	1	0	2	0	5
Manitoba (Stoughton)	0	0	1	0	1	0	0	3	0	1	6

Player percentages
Alberta		Manitoba	
Don Bartlett	84%	Steve Gould	86%
Shawn Broda	76%	Garry Van Den Berghe	83%
Don Walchuk	91%	Ken Tresoor	71%
Kevin Martin	76%	Jeff Stoughton	85%
Total	82%	Total	81%

=== Semifinal ===
Sheet C	1	2	3	4	5	6	7	8	9	10	Final
Alberta (Martin) 🔨	2	0	0	2	0	3	0	1	0	1	9
Quebec (Westphal)	0	1	1	0	2	0	1	0	3	0	8

Player percentages
Alberta		Quebec	
Don Bartlett	79%	Pierre Charette	86%
Shawn Broda	90%	Louis Biron	81%
Don Walchuk	80%	Daniel Lemery	79%
Kevin Martin	78%	Don Westphal	69%
Total	82%	Total	79%

=== Final ===
Sheet C	1	2	3	4	5	6	7	8	9	10	11	Final
Manitoba (Stoughton)	0	1	1	0	2	1	0	1	0	1	1	8
Alberta (Martin) 🔨	1	0	0	2	0	0	3	0	1	0	0	7

Player percentages
Manitoba		Alberta	
Steve Gould	88%	Don Bartlett	80%
Garry Van Den Berghe	69%	Shawn Broda	69%
Ken Tresoor	88%	Don Walchuk	74%
Jeff Stoughton	78%	Kevin Martin	74%
Total	81%	Total	74%

== Statistics ==
=== Top 5 player percentages ===
Round Robin only

Leads	%
(British Columbia) Bert Hinch	86
(New Brunswick) Rick Perron	85
(Nova Scotia) Glenn Josephson	85
(Prince Edward Island) Rod MacDonald	84
(Manitoba) Steve Gould	84

Seconds	%
(Saskatchewan) Dwayne Mihalicz	87
(Manitoba) Garry Van Den Berghe	82
(Alberta) Shawn Broda	82
(Ontario) Robert Rumfeldt	80
(British Columbia) Ken Brown	78

Thirds	%
(Alberta) Don Walchuk	86
(Manitoba) Ken Tresoor	83
(Quebec) Daniel Lemery	81
(Saskatchewan) Glen Despins	81
(British Columbia) Tony Eberts	81

Skips	%
(Alberta) Kevin Martin	86
(Manitoba) Jeff Stoughton	79
(Nova Scotia) Brian Rafuse	79
(Quebec) Don Westphal	78
(British Columbia) Barry McPhee	78

=== Team percentages ===
Round Robin only

Province	Skip	%
Alberta	Kevin Martin	84
Manitoba	Jeff Stoughton	82
British Columbia	Barry McPhee	81
New Brunswick	Mike Kennedy	81
Quebec	Don Westphal	80
Saskatchewan	Rod Montgomery	80
Nova Scotia	Brian Rafuse	80
Ontario	Bob Ingram	80
Newfoundland	Frank O'Driscoll	79
Prince Edward Island	Peter MacDonald	78
Northern Ontario	David MacInnes	73
Northwest Territories/Yukon	Richard Robertson	72
