= Ken Tresoor =

Canadian male curler

- Curler ♂

Team
- Curling club: Wildewood CC, Winnipeg, MB, Charleswood CC, Winnipeg, MB

Curling career
- Member Association: Manitoba
- Brier: 2: (1991, 1996)
- World Championship: 1 (1996)
Medal record
Curling
Representing Canada
World Championships
Gold medal – first place	1996 Hamilton
Representing Manitoba
Labatt Brier
Gold medal – first place	1996 Kamloops

Kenneth Tresoor (born November 27, 1966) is a Canadian curler.

He is a 1996 World Men's champion and a 1996 Labatt Brier champion.

== Teams ==
Season	Skip	Third	Second	Lead	Alternate	Events
1990–91	Jeff Stoughton	Dave Iverson	Ken Tresoor	Garry Vandenberghe	Howard Restall	Brier 1991 (5th)
1995–96	Jeff Stoughton	Ken Tresoor	Garry Vandenberghe	Steve Gould	Darryl Gunnlaugson	Brier 1996 (gold); WCC 1996 (gold)
1996–97	Jeff Stoughton	Ken Tresoor	Garry Vandenberghe	Steve Gould		
1997–98	Jeff Stoughton	Ken Tresoor	Garry Vandenberghe	Steve Gould	Arnold Asham	COCT 1997 (6th)
1998–99	Brent Scales	Ken Tresoor	Doug Harrison	Grant Spicer		
1999–00	Pat Spiring	Ken Tresoor	Jim Spencer	Scott Grant		
2000–01	Chad McMullan	Ken Tresoor	Ryan Fry	Jeff Steski		
2003–04	Kerry Burtnyk	Ken Tresoor	Rob Fowler	Keith Fenton		CC 2004 (4th)
2004–05	Kerry Burtnyk	Ken Tresoor	Rob Fowler	Keith Fenton		CC 2005 (4th)
2005–06	Dave Boehmer	Ken Tresoor	Pat Spiring	Keith Fenton		
2007–08	Vic Peters	Ken Tresoor	Chris Neufeld	Keith Fenton		
2008–09	Vic Peters	Ken Tresoor	Chris Neufeld	Keith Fenton		
2008–09	Kerry Burtnyk	Don Walchuk	Richard Daneault	Garth Smith	Ken Tresoor	
2009–10	William Lyburn	Geordie Hargreaves	Keith Marshall	Mike Marshall	Ken Tresoor	
2010–11	Garth Smith	Ken Tresoor	Ross McFayden	Myles Riddell		
2011–12	Dean Dunstone	Ken Tresoor	Taren Gesell	Greg Melnichuk	Andy Stewart	
2012–13	Dean Dunstone	Ken Tresoor	Dave Sitarik	Ron Gauthier		
