= 2016 Viterra Championship =

- Host city: Selkirk, Manitoba
- Arena: Selkirk Recreation Complex
- Dates: February 10–14
- Winner: Team McEwen
- Curling club: Fort Rouge CC, Winnipeg
- Skip: Mike McEwen
- Third: B. J. Neufeld
- Second: Matt Wozniak
- Lead: Denni Neufeld
- Finalist: Matt Dunstone

The 2016 Viterra Championship, Manitoba's provincial men's curling championship, was held from February 10 to 14 at the Selkirk Recreation Complex in Selkirk. The winning Mike McEwen team represented Manitoba at the 2016 Tim Hortons Brier in Ottawa.

This was the first time where Viterra sponsored the Manitoba men's provincial championships after Safeway sponsored the event since 1995.

== Teams ==
Teams are as follows:

| Skip | Third | Second | Lead | Alternate | Club |
|---|---|---|---|---|---|
| Ray Baker | Wes Jonasson | Sheldon Oshanyk | Justin Reischek | | Dauphin |
| David Bohn | Justin Richter | Tyler Forrest | Bryce McEwen | | Granite |
| Dennis Bohn | Sean Grassie | Bryan Galbraith | Daniel Gagne | | Assiniboine Memorial |
| Reid Carruthers | Braeden Moskowy | Derek Samagalski | Colin Hodgson | | West St. Paul |
| Tyler Drews | Joshua Drews | Daryl Evans | Jake Zelenewich | | Fort Rouge |
| Matt Dunstone | Colton Lott | Kyle Doering | Rob Gordon | Kyle Kurz | Granite |
| Alex Forrest | Travis Bale | Ian McMillan | Connor Njegovan | | East St. Paul |
| Hayden Forrester | Brennan Sampson | Brett MacDonald | Cole Chandler | Andrew Clapham | Fort Rouge |
| Kyle Foster | Andrew Wickman | Dale Lott | Tom Want | | Arborg |
| Jordan Peters | Brian Peters | Graeme Bergman | Lorne Hamblin (skip) | Brian Peters, Sr. | Morris |
| Troy Hamilton | Dean Steski | Jason Kasdorf | Bryan Harder | Thomas Small | Fort Rouge |
| Doug Harrison | Jamie Hay | Darryl Gunnlaugson | Larry Borus | | Granite |
| Steve Irwin | Travis Taylor | Cody Rabe | Travis Saban | Travis Brooks | Brandon |
| Jared Kolomaya | Neil Kitching | Kennedy Bird | Daniel Hunt | | Stonewall |
| Trevor Loreth | Brad Haight | Ryan Lowdon | Brett Cawson | Braden Calvert | Granite |
| Mark Lukowich | Stu Gresham | Chris Chimuk | Kevin Wiebe | Randall Thomas | Granite |
| William Lyburn | Jason Gunnlaugson | Richard Daneault | Braden Zawada | | Granite |
| Kelly Marnoch | Bart Witherspoon | Branden Jorgensen | Chris Cameron | Rob Van Kommer | Carberry |
| Mike McEwen | B. J. Neufeld | Matt Wozniak | Denni Neufeld | Jon Mead | Fort Rouge |
| Taylor McIntyre | Sam Good | Riley Smith | Jared Hancox | Connor McIntyre | Granite |
| Terry McNamee | Brendan Taylor | Geordie Hargreaves | Travis Gouldie | Shane MacGranachan | Brandon |
| Butch Mouck | Glenn Parrott | Scott Gray | Cory Parrott | | Minnedosa |
| Randy Neufeld | Dean Moxham | Devon Wiebe | Brett Moxham | | La Salle |
| Derek Oryniak | Jordan Smith | Chris Gallant | Kyle Allenby | Weston Oryniak | Granite |
| Shaun Parsons | Kevin Parsons | Bronston Jonasson | Jim Davidson | | Burntwood |
| Steve Pauls | Clare Reimer | Kevin Friesen | Dylan Reimer | Eric Atkins | Clearwater |
| Daley Peters | Corey Chambers | Kody Janzen | Stu Shiells | Brendan Bilawka | East St. Paul |
| Scott Ramsay | Mark Taylor | Ross McFadyen | Kyle Werenich | | Thistle |
| Justin Reynolds | Tanner Lott | Wade Ford | Nick Weshnoweski | | Winnipeg Beach |
| Greg Todoruk | Peter Prokopowich | Darcy Todoruk | Dwight Bottrell | Mike Csversko | Dauphin |
| Murray Woodward | James Kirkness | Devin McArthur | Chad Barkman | | St. Adolphe |
| Rylan Young | Scott Podolsky | Curtis Joyal | Phil Cook | Joel Semaniuk | Springfield |

== Knockout Brackets ==
32 team double knockout with playoff round
Four teams qualify each from A Event and B Event

=== A Event ===
First Knockout | Qualifier 1
Murray Woodward | 3
Terry McNamee | 6
Terry McNamee | 4
Mike McEwen | 11
Mike McEwen | 8
Justin Reynolds | 4
Mike McEwen | 5
Dennis Bohn | 3
Rylan Young | 3
David Bohn | 11
David Bohn | 2
Dennis Bohn | 9
Dennis Bohn | 8
Greg Todoruk | 6

First Knockout | Qualifier 2
Tyler Drews | 7
Taylor McIntyre | 6
Tyler Drews | 2
Matt Dunstone | 7
Matt Dunstone | 8
Lorne Hamblin | 4
Matt Dunstone | 6
William Lyburn | 7
Troy Hamilton | 5
William Lyburn | 8
William Lyburn | 9
Kyle Foster | 4
Kelly Marnoch | 6
Kyle Foster | 10

First Knockout | Qualifier 3
Derek Oryniak | 3
Trevor Loreth | 6
Trevor Loreth | 3
Daley Peters | 8
Daley Peters | 6
Steve Pauls | 4
Daley Peters | 6
Alex Forrest | 3
Butch Mouck | 2
Alex Forrest | 5
Alex Forrest | 9
Steve Irwin | 3
Steve Irwin | 8
Doug Harrison | 2

First Knockout | Qualifier 4
Mark Lukowich | 4
Randy Neufeld | 9
Randy Neufeld | 2
Reid Carruthers | 9
Reid Carruthers | 12
Shaun Parsons | 1
Reid Carruthers | 7
Scott Ramsay | 9
Hayden Forrester | 1
Scott Ramsay | 12
Scott Ramsay | 6
Jared Kolomaya | 5
Jared Kolomaya | 11
Ray Baker | 1

=== B Event ===
Second Knockout | Qualifier 5
David Bohn | 10
Murray Woodward | 5 | Justin Reynolds | 3 | Dennis Bohn | 5
Justin Reynolds | 9 | David Bohn | 9 | David Bohn | 3
Rylan Young | 7
Terry McNamee | 4
Rylan Young | 7 | Rylan Young | 7
Greg Todoruk | 6

Second Knockout | Qualifier 6
Kyle Foster | 4
Taylor McIntyre | 8 | Taylor McIntyre | 10 | Matt Dunstone | 5
Lorne Hamblin | 3 | Taylor McIntyre | 7 | Taylor McIntyre | 3
Kelly Marnoch | 1
Tyler Drews | 10
Troy Hamilton | 5 | Kelly Marnoch | 11
Kelly Marnoch | 9

Second Knockout | Qualifier 7
Steve Irwin | 8
Derek Oryniak | 8 | Derek Oryniak | 7 | Alex Forrest | 7
Steve Pauls | 7 | Steve Irwin | 9 | Steve Irwin | 5
Trevor Loreth | 6
Trevor Loreth | 9
Butch Mouck | 6 | Doug Harrison | 3
Doug Harrison | 7

Second Knockout | Qualifier 8
Jared Kolomaya | 9
Mark Lukowich | 5 | Mark Lukowich | 1 | Reid Carruthers | 6
Shaun Parsons | 2 | Jared Kolomaya | 4 | Hayden Forrester | 5
Hayden Forrester | 8
Randy Neufeld | 7
Hayden Forrester | 8 | Hayden Forrester | 11
Ray Baker | 2

== Playoff Brackets ==
8 team double knockout
Four teams qualify into Championship Round

=== A event ===
First Knockout
Q1 | Mike McEwen | 7
Q6 | Matt Dunstone | 2
Q2 | William Lyburn | 6
Q5 | Dennis Bohn | 4

Qualifier 1
Q1 | Mike McEwen | 7
Q2 | William Lyburn | 3

First Knockout
Q3 | Daley Peters | 2
Q8 | Reid Carruthers | 7
Q4 | Scott Ramsay | 4
Q7 | Alex Forrest | 9

Qualifier 2
Q8 | Reid Carruthers | 4
Q7 | Alex Forrest | 3

=== B event ===
| Second Knockout | | | Qualifier 3 |
| | | | Q7 | Alex Forrest | 3 |
| Q6 | Matt Dunstone | 7 | Q6 | Matt Dunstone | 7 |
| Q5 | Dennis Bohn | 1 |

| Second Knockout | | | Qualifier 4 |
| | | | Q2 | William Lyburn | 5 |
| Q3 | Daley Peters | 7 | Q3 | Daley Peters | 3 |
| Q4 | Scott Ramsay | 6 |

== Championship Round ==
Page playoff system
1 | Mike McEwen | 7
2 | Reid Carruthers | 2
3 | Matt Dunstone | 8
4 | William Lyburn | 7

Semifinal
2 | Reid Carruthers | 4
3 | Matt Dunstone | 8

Final
1 | Mike McEwen | 4
3 | Matt Dunstone | 2

=== 1 vs. 2 ===
Saturday, February 13, 6:00 pm

| Sheet C | 1 | 2 | 3 | 4 | 5 | 6 | 7 | 8 | 9 | 10 | Final |
|---|---|---|---|---|---|---|---|---|---|---|---|
| Mike McEwen | 0 | 0 | 1 | 0 | 2 | 2 | 2 | 0 | X | X | 7 |
| Reid Carruthers | 0 | 0 | 0 | 1 | 0 | 0 | 0 | 1 | X | X | 2 |

=== 3 vs. 4 ===
Saturday, February 13, 6:00 pm

| Sheet A | 1 | 2 | 3 | 4 | 5 | 6 | 7 | 8 | 9 | 10 | 11 | Final |
|---|---|---|---|---|---|---|---|---|---|---|---|---|
| Matt Dunstone | 0 | 0 | 0 | 4 | 0 | 2 | 0 | 0 | 1 | 0 | 1 | 8 |
| William Lyburn | 0 | 2 | 0 | 0 | 2 | 0 | 1 | 0 | 0 | 2 | 0 | 7 |

=== Semifinal ===
Sunday, February 14, 9:00 am

| Sheet C | 1 | 2 | 3 | 4 | 5 | 6 | 7 | 8 | 9 | 10 | Final |
|---|---|---|---|---|---|---|---|---|---|---|---|
| Reid Carruthers | 1 | 0 | 0 | 1 | 0 | 1 | 0 | 1 | 0 | X | 4 |
| Matt Dunstone | 0 | 0 | 1 | 0 | 4 | 0 | 2 | 0 | 1 | X | 8 |

=== Final ===
Sunday, February 14, 2:00 pm

| Sheet C | 1 | 2 | 3 | 4 | 5 | 6 | 7 | 8 | 9 | 10 | Final |
|---|---|---|---|---|---|---|---|---|---|---|---|
| Mike McEwen | 0 | 0 | 1 | 0 | 0 | 1 | 0 | 0 | 0 | 2 | 4 |
| Matt Dunstone | 0 | 0 | 0 | 1 | 0 | 0 | 1 | 0 | 0 | 0 | 2 |

2016 Viterra Championship

Mike McEwen
1st Manitoba Provincial Championship title
