= Garry Van Den Berghe =

Canadian curler

Garry Van Den Berghe (born November 13, 1960, in La Rivière, Manitoba) is a Canadian curler from Winnipeg, Manitoba, and now living in Vernon, British Columbia. He coached the Jason Gunnlaugson rink in 2020 and in 2020 he began coaching a Japanese women’s curling team.

Van Den Berghe had played second for Jeff Stoughton until 2006, and played lead for him in 1991. With Stoughton, he won five provincial championships (1991, 1996, 1999, 2000, 2006), two Briers (1996, 1999), a World Curling Championship in 1996 and a World Championship silver in 1999.

He started his career in 1986 playing lead for David Tonnellier and played in his first provincial in 1987 with the same team.

== Personal life ==
Van Den Berghe is married and has two children. He is retired.
