= 2025 Masters (September) =

Grand Slam of Curling event

2025 AMJ Masters
- Host city: London, Ontario
- Arena: Western Fair Sports Centre
- Dates: September 23–28
- Men's winner: (Manitoba) Team Dunstone
- Curling club: Fort Rouge CC, Winnipeg
- Skip: Matt Dunstone
- Third: Colton Lott
- Second: E. J. Harnden
- Lead: Ryan Harnden
- Coach: Caleb Flaxey
- Finalist: (Scotland) Ross Whyte
- Women's winner: (Ontario) Team Homan
- Curling club: Ottawa CC, Ottawa
- Skip: Rachel Homan
- Third: Tracy Fleury
- Second: Emma Miskew
- Lead: Sarah Wilkes
- Coach: Viktor Kjäll
- Finalist: (Switzerland) Silvana Tirinzoni

The 2025 AMJ Masters was held from September 23 to 28 at the Western Fair Sports Centre in London, Ontario. It was the first Grand Slam event and first major of the 2025–26 curling season.

The field included sixty-four teams from thirteen different nations (Canada, China, Czechia, Denmark, Germany, Italy, Japan, Norway, Scotland, South Korea, Sweden, Switzerland and the United States). Of note, all fourteen teams confirmed to compete in the 2026 Winter Olympics qualified. It was also the first time since the 2017–18 season that both the Chinese men's and women's teams competed in a Slam.

For the first time since 2012, the event featured a Tier 2 bracket, hosted at the St. Thomas Curling Club in St. Thomas, Ontario. The event also held the inaugural GSOC Wheelchair Curling Invitational at the KW Granite Club in Waterloo.

== New rules ==
For this event, a number of new rules were implemented:

- Games tied after eight ends go to a draw-to-the-button shootout rather than extra ends. This does not apply to playoff games.
- Games will be worth three points in the standings, with three points being awarded to "regulation wins", two points for a shootout win, and one point for a shootout loss.
- "Thinking time" will be reduced from 33 to 31 minutes.

== Qualification ==
The Masters consists of two tiers of 16 teams. For Tier 1, the top 16 men's and top 16 women's teams from the World Curling Federation's world rankings based on the final standings of the 2024–25 curling season were invited to participate. In the event that a team declined their invitation, the next-ranked team on the world team ranking was invited until the field was complete. Once the Tier 1 field was confirmed, Tier 2 invites were sent out to the next thirteen ranked teams. The final three spots in the Tier 2 event were regional invites sent out to Ontario based teams. The Grand Slam of Curling reserves the right to implement two sponsor's exemption in the Tier 1 men's and women's events in which one spot can be filled at their discretion.

=== Men ===
==== Tier 1 ====
Top world team ranking men's teams:

1. (Scotland) Bruce Mouat
2. (Switzerland) Yannick Schwaller
3. (Alberta) Brad Jacobs
4. (Manitoba) Matt Dunstone
5. (Scotland) Ross Whyte
6. (Saskatchewan) Mike McEwen
7. (Newfoundland and Labrador) Brad Gushue
8. (Germany) Marc Muskatewitz
9. (Switzerland) Marco Hösli
10. (Ontario) John Epping
11. (Italy) Joël Retornaz
12. (United States) Korey Dropkin
13. (Sweden) Niklas Edin
14. (Norway) Magnus Ramsfjell
15. (Saskatchewan) Rylan Kleiter
16. (China) Xu Xiaoming

==== Tier 2 ====
World Team Rankings teams:

1. (Manitoba) Reid Carruthers
2. (Switzerland) Michael Brunner
3. (Manitoba) Jordon McDonald
4. (Scotland) Kyle Waddell
5. (Japan) Shinya Abe
6. (United States) John Shuster
7. (United States) Daniel Casper
8. (Japan) Tsuyoshi Yamaguchi
9. (Ontario) Sam Mooibroek
10. (Czech Republic) Lukáš Klíma
11. (Alberta) Kevin Koe
12. (Scotland) Cameron Bryce
13. (Ontario) Scott Howard
14. (Japan) Takumi Maeda

Regional teams:

- (Ontario) Jayden King
- (Ontario) Kibo Mulima

=== Women ===
==== Tier 1 ====
Top world team ranking women's teams:

1. (Ontario) Rachel Homan
2. (Switzerland) Silvana Tirinzoni
3. (Sweden) Anna Hasselborg
4. (South Korea) Kim Eun-jung
5. (Manitoba) Kerri Einarson
6. (South Korea) Gim Eun-ji
7. (Japan) Satsuki Fujisawa
8. (Japan) Sayaka Yoshimura
9. (Japan) Momoha Tabata
10. (South Korea) Ha Seung-youn
11. (Switzerland) Xenia Schwaller
12. (Sweden) Isabella Wranå
13. (Alberta) Kayla Skrlik
14. (China) Wang Rui
15. (Nova Scotia) Christina Black
16. (Italy) Stefania Constantini

==== Tier 2 ====
World Team Rankings teams:

1. (Japan) Ikue Kitazawa
2. (Scotland) Rebecca Morrison
3. (Manitoba) Kate Cameron
4. (Manitoba) Kaitlyn Lawes
5. (South Korea) Kang Bo-bae
6. (British Columbia) Corryn Brown
7. (Japan) ~~Miyu Ueno~~
8. (Manitoba) Beth Peterson
9. (Scotland) Fay Henderson
10. (Switzerland) Corrie Hürlimann
11. (Denmark) Madeleine Dupont
12. (Norway) ~~Marianne Rørvik~~
13. (United States) Delaney Strouse
14. (United States) Tabitha Peterson
15. (Ontario) Danielle Inglis
16. (British Columbia) Kayla MacMillan

Regional teams:

- (Ontario) Chelsea Principi
- (Ontario) Emma Artichuk

== Format ==
Teams were put into four pots based on their rankings, with teams then drafted into four pools of four teams. Each team plays the three other teams in their pool, plus a cross over game based on their ranking after playing the teams in their pool. Teams in Pool A will play teams in Pool C and teams in Pool B will play teams in Pool D based on their inverse ranking (1st vs. 4th, 2nd vs. 3rd).

Following pool play, the top 8 teams qualify for the playoffs.

== Men ==
=== Tier 1 ===
==== Teams ====
The teams are listed as follows:

Skip	Third	Second	Lead	Alternate	Locale
Korey Dropkin	Thomas Howell	Andrew Stopera	Mark Fenner		(United States) Duluth, Minnesota
Matt Dunstone	Colton Lott	E. J. Harnden	Ryan Harnden		Winnipeg, Manitoba
Niklas Edin	Oskar Eriksson	Rasmus Wranå	Christoffer Sundgren		Karlstad, Sweden
John Epping	Jacob Horgan	Tanner Horgan	Ian McMillan		Sudbury, Ontario
Brad Gushue	Mark Nichols	Brendan Bottcher	Geoff Walker		St. John's, Newfoundland and Labrador
Philipp Hösli (Fourth)	Marco Hösli (Skip)	Simon Gloor	Justin Hausherr		Glarus, Switzerland
Brad Jacobs	Marc Kennedy	Brett Gallant	Ben Hebert		Calgary, Alberta
Rylan Kleiter	Joshua Mattern	Matthew Hall	Trevor Johnson		Saskatoon, Saskatchewan
Mike McEwen	Colton Flasch	Kevin Marsh	Dan Marsh		Saskatoon, Saskatchewan
Bruce Mouat	Grant Hardie	Bobby Lammie	Hammy McMillan Jr.		Edinburgh, Scotland
Marc Muskatewitz	Benjamin Kapp	Felix Messenzehl	Johannes Scheuerl	Mario Trevisiol	Füssen, Germany
Magnus Ramsfjell	Martin Sesaker	Bendik Ramsfjell	Gaute Nepstad		Trondheim, Norway
Joël Retornaz	Amos Mosaner	Sebastiano Arman	Mattia Giovanella		Trentino, Italy
Benoît Schwarz-van Berkel (Fourth)	Yannick Schwaller (Skip)	Sven Michel	Pablo Lachat		Geneva, Switzerland
Ross Whyte	Robin Brydone	Craig Waddell (Note: Alternate Craig Waddell spared for Duncan McFadzean.)	Euan Kyle		Stirling, Scotland
Xu Xiaoming	Fei Xueqing	Li Zhichao	Xu Jingtao	Yang Bohao	Beijing, China

==== Round robin standings ====
Final Round Robin Standings

Key
Teams to Playoffs
Teams to Tiebreakers

Pool A	W	SOW	SOL	L	PF	PA	Pts
(Italy) Joël Retornaz	3	1	0	0	28	16	11
(Switzerland) Yannick Schwaller	2	0	0	2	24	28	6
(China) Xu Xiaoming	1	1	0	2	25	25	5
(Newfoundland and Labrador) Brad Gushue	1	0	0	3	15	21	3

Pool B	W	SOW	SOL	L	PF	PA	Pts
(Scotland) Bruce Mouat	1	1	2	0	27	23	7
(Sweden) Niklas Edin	2	0	0	2	17	26	6
(Germany) Marc Muskatewitz	1	0	1	2	22	22	4
(Switzerland) Marco Hösli	0	1	0	3	18	35	2

Pool C	W	SOW	SOL	L	PF	PA	Pts
(Manitoba) Matt Dunstone	3	0	0	1	25	18	9
(Norway) Magnus Ramsfjell	2	0	1	1	21	22	7
(Saskatchewan) Mike McEwen	2	0	0	2	21	18	6
(United States) Korey Dropkin	0	0	1	3	13	24	1

Pool D	W	SOW	SOL	L	PF	PA	Pts
(Scotland) Ross Whyte	4	0	0	0	33	7	12
(Ontario) John Epping	3	0	0	1	18	16	9
(Alberta) Brad Jacobs	2	0	0	2	25	17	6
(Saskatchewan) Rylan Kleiter	0	1	0	3	15	29	2

==== Round robin results ====
All draw times are listed in Eastern Time (UTC−05:00).

===== Draw 1 =====
Tuesday, September 23, 8:00 am

Sheet A	1	2	3	4	5	6	7	8	Final
(Switzerland) Yannick Schwaller	0	2	0	0	2	1	0	0	5
(China) Xu Xiaoming 🔨	2	0	0	2	0	0	3	3	10

Sheet D	1	2	3	4	5	6	7	8	Final
(Saskatchewan) Mike McEwen 🔨	1	0	0	0	3	0	2	0	6
(Norway) Magnus Ramsfjell	0	1	1	2	0	1	0	2	7

===== Draw 2 =====
Tuesday, September 23, 11:30 am

Sheet A	1	2	3	4	5	6	7	8	Final
(Germany) Marc Muskatewitz 🔨	3	0	4	0	0	1	2	X	10
(Switzerland) Marco Hösli	0	2	0	1	1	0	0	X	4

Sheet D	1	2	3	4	5	6	7	8	Final
(Scotland) Ross Whyte 🔨	0	1	0	3	0	1	0	1	6
(Ontario) John Epping	0	0	1	0	1	0	0	0	2

===== Draw 3 =====
Tuesday, September 23, 3:00 pm

Sheet A	1	2	3	4	5	6	7	8	Final
(Scotland) Bruce Mouat 🔨	2	0	3	1	0	2	X	X	8
(Sweden) Niklas Edin	0	1	0	0	2	0	X	X	3

Sheet D	1	2	3	4	5	6	7	8	Final
(Alberta) Brad Jacobs 🔨	2	0	3	0	0	3	1	X	9
(Saskatchewan) Rylan Kleiter	0	2	0	0	2	0	0	X	4

===== Draw 4 =====
Tuesday, September 23, 6:30 pm

Sheet A	1	2	3	4	5	6	7	8	Final
(Newfoundland and Labrador) Brad Gushue 🔨	0	0	1	0	1	0	0	0	2
(Italy) Joël Retornaz	0	0	0	1	0	2	1	2	6

Sheet D	1	2	3	4	5	6	7	8	Final
(Manitoba) Matt Dunstone 🔨	1	0	1	0	0	1	0	3	6
(United States) Korey Dropkin	0	1	0	0	1	0	2	0	4

===== Draw 5 =====
Wednesday, September 24, 8:00 am

Sheet B	1	2	3	4	5	6	7	8	Final
(Germany) Marc Muskatewitz	0	1	0	2	0	0	1	0	4
(Sweden) Niklas Edin 🔨	2	0	1	0	0	2	0	2	7

Sheet C	1	2	3	4	5	6	7	8	Final
(Scotland) Ross Whyte 🔨	1	1	3	0	0	4	X	X	9
(Saskatchewan) Rylan Kleiter	0	0	0	1	1	0	X	X	2

===== Draw 6 =====
Wednesday, September 24, 11:30 am

Sheet B	1	2	3	4	5	6	7	8	Final
(Saskatchewan) Mike McEwen 🔨	2	1	0	1	0	3	X	X	7
(United States) Korey Dropkin	0	0	0	0	1	0	X	X	1

Sheet C	1	2	3	4	5	6	7	8	Final
(Newfoundland and Labrador) Brad Gushue 🔨	1	2	0	0	1	0	2	0	6
(China) Xu Xiaoming	0	0	0	2	0	2	0	1	5

===== Draw 7 =====
Wednesday, September 24, 3:30 pm

Sheet B	1	2	3	4	5	6	7	8	Final
(Manitoba) Matt Dunstone 🔨	1	3	0	1	0	0	1	X	6
(Norway) Magnus Ramsfjell	0	0	1	0	1	1	0	X	3

Sheet C	1	2	3	4	5	6	7	8	Final
(Switzerland) Yannick Schwaller	0	0	3	0	1	0	2	0	6
(Italy) Joël Retornaz 🔨	2	1	0	2	0	1	0	2	8

===== Draw 8 =====
Wednesday, September 24, 7:30 pm

Sheet B	1	2	3	4	5	6	7	8	9	Final
(Scotland) Bruce Mouat	0	2	0	1	0	3	1	0	0	7
(Switzerland) Marco Hösli 🔨	3	0	2	0	1	0	0	1	1	8

Sheet C	1	2	3	4	5	6	7	8	Final
(Alberta) Brad Jacobs	0	2	0	1	0	1	0	1	5
(Ontario) John Epping 🔨	1	0	1	0	2	0	2	0	6

===== Draw 9 =====
Thursday, September 25, 8:00 am

Sheet B	1	2	3	4	5	6	7	8	Final
(Italy) Joël Retornaz 🔨	0	1	0	4	1	0	2	X	8
(China) Xu Xiaoming	0	0	1	0	0	2	0	X	3

Sheet C	1	2	3	4	5	6	7	8	Final
(Norway) Magnus Ramsfjell 🔨	2	0	0	1	1	0	0	1	5
(United States) Korey Dropkin	0	0	1	0	0	1	1	0	3

===== Draw 10 =====
Thursday, September 25, 11:30 am

Sheet B	1	2	3	4	5	6	7	8	Final
(Switzerland) Yannick Schwaller	0	0	1	1	0	2	0	1	5
(Newfoundland and Labrador) Brad Gushue 🔨	1	1	0	0	1	0	1	0	4

Sheet C	1	2	3	4	5	6	7	8	9	Final
(Scotland) Bruce Mouat 🔨	1	0	1	0	2	0	0	2	1	7
(Germany) Marc Muskatewitz	0	2	0	1	0	3	0	0	0	6

===== Draw 11 =====
Thursday, September 25, 3:30 pm

Sheet C	1	2	3	4	5	6	7	8	Final
(Switzerland) Marco Hösli 🔨	0	1	0	1	0	0	2	0	4
(Sweden) Niklas Edin	0	0	1	0	1	3	0	1	6

===== Draw 12 =====
Thursday, September 25, 7:30 pm

Sheet A	1	2	3	4	5	6	7	8	Final
(Ontario) John Epping 🔨	2	0	0	2	0	0	1	1	6
(Saskatchewan) Rylan Kleiter	0	2	0	0	1	0	0	0	3

Sheet B	1	2	3	4	5	6	7	8	Final
(Alberta) Brad Jacobs	0	0	0	1	0	0	X	X	1
(Scotland) Ross Whyte 🔨	3	0	0	0	2	1	X	X	6

Sheet C	1	2	3	4	5	6	7	8	Final
(Manitoba) Matt Dunstone 🔨	0	1	0	2	0	0	1	3	7
(Saskatchewan) Mike McEwen	0	0	2	0	0	1	0	0	3

===== Draw 13 =====
Friday, September 26, 8:00 am

Sheet D	1	2	3	4	5	6	7	8	9	Final
(Italy) Joël Retornaz	1	1	0	2	0	0	1	0	1	6
(United States) Korey Dropkin 🔨	0	0	4	0	0	0	0	1	0	5

===== Draw 14 =====
Friday, September 26, 11:30 am

Sheet A	1	2	3	4	5	6	7	8	Final
(Scotland) Ross Whyte 🔨	3	0	3	0	3	3	X	X	12
(Switzerland) Marco Hösli	0	1	0	1	0	0	X	X	2

Sheet B	1	2	3	4	5	6	7	8	9	Final
(Scotland) Bruce Mouat 🔨	0	0	1	0	2	0	2	0	0	5
(Saskatchewan) Rylan Kleiter	0	1	0	1	0	2	0	1	1	6

===== Draw 15 =====
Friday, September 26, 3:30 pm

Sheet A	1	2	3	4	5	6	7	8	Final
(Sweden) Niklas Edin	0	0	0	1	0	X	X	X	1
(Alberta) Brad Jacobs 🔨	2	4	3	0	1	X	X	X	10

Sheet B	1	2	3	4	5	6	7	8	Final
(Ontario) John Epping	1	2	0	0	0	0	0	1	4
(Germany) Marc Muskatewitz 🔨	0	0	1	0	0	1	0	0	2

Sheet C	1	2	3	4	5	6	7	8	Final
(Newfoundland and Labrador) Brad Gushue	0	1	0	1	0	0	1	X	3
(Saskatchewan) Mike McEwen 🔨	1	0	2	0	0	2	0	X	5

Sheet D	1	2	3	4	5	6	7	8	Final
(Manitoba) Matt Dunstone	1	0	2	0	1	0	2	0	6
(Switzerland) Yannick Schwaller 🔨	0	2	0	2	0	2	0	2	8

===== Draw 16 =====
Friday, September 26, 7:30 pm

Sheet B	1	2	3	4	5	6	7	8	9	Final
(Norway) Magnus Ramsfjell	0	0	1	0	0	3	2	0	0	6
(China) Xu Xiaoming 🔨	0	3	0	1	0	0	0	2	1	7

==== Tiebreakers ====
Saturday, September 27, 8:00 am

Sheet B	1	2	3	4	5	6	7	8	Final
(Sweden) Niklas Edin	0	2	1	0	1	0	1	0	5
(Switzerland) Yannick Schwaller 🔨	2	0	0	2	0	2	0	1	7

Sheet D	1	2	3	4	5	6	7	8	Final
(Saskatchewan) Mike McEwen	0	0	1	0	1	0	0	X	2
(Alberta) Brad Jacobs 🔨	0	1	0	2	0	1	1	X	5

==== Playoffs ====
Quarterfinals
1	(Scotland) Ross Whyte	6
8	(Switzerland) Yannick Schwaller	5
4	(Ontario) John Epping	2
5	(Scotland) Bruce Mouat	3
2	(Italy) Joël Retornaz	3
7	(Alberta) Brad Jacobs	4
3	(Manitoba) Matt Dunstone	6
6	(Norway) Magnus Ramsfjell	3

Semifinals
1	(Scotland) Ross Whyte	6
5	(Scotland) Bruce Mouat	5
7	(Alberta) Brad Jacobs	5
3	(Manitoba) Matt Dunstone	6

Final
1	(Scotland) Ross Whyte	4
3	(Manitoba) Matt Dunstone	6

===== Quarterfinals =====
Saturday, September 27, 11:30 am

Sheet A	1	2	3	4	5	6	7	8	Final
(Italy) Joël Retornaz 🔨	0	0	1	0	0	0	2	0	3
(Alberta) Brad Jacobs	0	1	0	0	2	0	0	1	4

Sheet B	1	2	3	4	5	6	7	8	Final
(Ontario) John Epping 🔨	0	0	1	0	0	0	1	0	2
(Scotland) Bruce Mouat	0	0	0	1	0	0	0	2	3

Sheet C	1	2	3	4	5	6	7	8	Final
(Scotland) Ross Whyte 🔨	2	0	0	0	2	0	1	1	6
(Switzerland) Yannick Schwaller	0	1	1	1	0	2	0	0	5

Sheet D	1	2	3	4	5	6	7	8	Final
(Manitoba) Matt Dunstone 🔨	1	0	1	0	2	0	2	X	6
(Norway) Magnus Ramsfjell	0	1	0	1	0	1	0	X	3

===== Semifinals =====
Saturday, September 27, 7:30 pm

Sheet A	1	2	3	4	5	6	7	8	Final
(Scotland) Ross Whyte 🔨	2	0	0	2	0	0	0	2	6
(Scotland) Bruce Mouat	0	0	1	0	3	0	1	0	5

Sheet B	1	2	3	4	5	6	7	8	9	Final
(Alberta) Brad Jacobs	0	0	3	0	0	1	0	1	0	5
(Manitoba) Matt Dunstone 🔨	1	0	0	1	1	0	2	0	1	6

===== Final =====
Sunday, September 28, 11:30 am

Sheet C	1	2	3	4	5	6	7	8	9	Final
(Scotland) Ross Whyte 🔨	0	0	0	3	0	0	0	1	0	4
(Manitoba) Matt Dunstone	0	1	1	0	0	2	0	0	2	6

=== Tier 2 ===
==== Teams ====
The teams are listed as follows:

Skip	Third	Second	Lead	Alternate	Locale
Tetsuro Shimizu (Fourth)	Shinya Abe (Skip)	Hayato Sato	Haruto Ouchi	Sota Tsuruga	Sapporo, Japan
Michael Brunner	Anthony Petoud	Romano Meier	Andreas Gerlach		Bern, Switzerland
Cameron Bryce	Duncan Menzies	Scott Hyslop	Robin McCall		Kelso, Scotland
Reid Carruthers	B. J. Neufeld	Catlin Schneider	Connor Njegovan		Winnipeg, Manitoba
Daniel Casper	Luc Violette	Ben Richardson	Aidan Oldenburg	Rich Ruohonen	(United States) Chaska, Minnesota
Scott Howard	Mat Camm	Jason Camm	Scott Chadwick		Navan, Ontario
Jayden King	Dylan Niepage	Owen Henry	Victor Pietrangelo		London, Ontario
Lukáš Klíma	Marek Černovský	Martin Jurík	Lukáš Klípa	Radek Boháč	Prague, Czech Republic
Kevin Koe	Tyler Tardi	Aaron Sluchinski	Karrick Martin		Calgary, Alberta
Takumi Maeda	Hiroki Maeda	Uryu Kamikawa	Gakuto Tokoro		Tokoro, Japan
Jordon McDonald	Jacques Gauthier	Elias Huminicki	Cameron Olafson		Winnipeg, Manitoba
Sam Mooibroek	Ryan Wiebe	Scott Mitchell	Nathan Steele		Whitby, Ontario
Kibo Mulima	Wyatt Small	Wyatt Wright	Nathan Kim	Adam Moor	Waterloo, Ontario
John Shuster	Chris Plys	Colin Hufman	Matt Hamilton		(United States) Duluth, Minnesota
Kyle Waddell	Mark Watt	Angus Bryce	Blair Haswell		Hamilton, Scotland
Riku Yanagisawa	– (Note: Team Yamaguchi played with three players as skip Tsuyoshi Yamaguchi was competing in the 2025 Japanese Olympic mixed doubles curling trials.)	Takeru Yamamoto	Satoshi Koizumi		Karuizawa, Japan

==== Round robin standings ====
Final Round Robin Standings

Key
Teams to Playoffs
Teams to Tiebreaker

Pool A	W	SOW	SOL	L	PF	PA	Pts
(Ontario) Sam Mooibroek	3	0	0	1	27	17	9
(Japan) Team Yamaguchi	2	1	0	1	27	21	8
(Manitoba) Reid Carruthers	1	0	1	2	21	26	4
(Ontario) Kibo Mulima	0	0	0	4	13	30	0

Pool B	W	SOW	SOL	L	PF	PA	Pts
(Ontario) Jayden King	3	0	0	1	30	15	9
(United States) Daniel Casper	2	0	1	1	27	25	7
(Czech Republic) Lukáš Klíma	2	0	0	2	23	24	6
(Switzerland) Michael Brunner	0	1	0	3	15	28	2

Pool C	W	SOW	SOL	L	PF	PA	Pts
(United States) John Shuster	3	0	0	1	25	17	9
(Alberta) Kevin Koe	3	0	0	1	23	20	9
(Manitoba) Jordon McDonald	2	0	0	2	23	21	6
(Japan) Takumi Maeda	1	0	0	3	18	25	3

Pool D	W	SOW	SOL	L	PF	PA	Pts
(Scotland) Kyle Waddell	4	0	0	0	31	13	12
(Ontario) Scott Howard	2	0	0	2	22	26	6
(Scotland) Cameron Bryce	1	0	0	3	20	24	3
(Japan) Shinya Abe	1	0	0	3	13	26	3

==== Round robin results ====
All draw times are listed in Eastern Time (UTC−05:00).

===== Draw 1 =====
Wednesday, September 24, 6:30 pm

Sheet E	1	2	3	4	5	6	7	8	Final
(Manitoba) Reid Carruthers 🔨	2	0	0	2	2	0	2	X	8
(Ontario) Kibo Mulima	0	1	1	0	0	2	0	X	4

Sheet F	1	2	3	4	5	6	7	8	Final
(Japan) Team Yamaguchi	0	2	0	2	0	1	0	X	5
(Ontario) Sam Mooibroek 🔨	2	0	2	0	1	0	3	X	8

===== Draw 2 =====
Thursday, September 25, 8:00 am

Sheet E	1	2	3	4	5	6	7	8	Final
(Manitoba) Jordon McDonald	0	1	0	1	3	0	2	0	7
(United States) John Shuster 🔨	0	0	3	0	0	1	0	1	5

Sheet F	1	2	3	4	5	6	7	8	Final
(Alberta) Kevin Koe	0	1	1	0	2	0	2	X	6
(Japan) Takumi Maeda 🔨	1	0	0	1	0	1	0	X	3

===== Draw 3 =====
Thursday, September 25, 11:15 am

Sheet A	1	2	3	4	5	6	7	8	Final
(Manitoba) Reid Carruthers 🔨	1	0	1	0	1	0	X	X	3
(Ontario) Sam Mooibroek	0	3	0	2	0	3	X	X	8

Sheet B	1	2	3	4	5	6	7	8	Final
(Japan) Team Yamaguchi 🔨	2	0	2	0	1	1	2	X	8
(Ontario) Kibo Mulima	0	1	0	1	0	0	0	X	2

Sheet C	1	2	3	4	5	6	7	8	Final
(Switzerland) Michael Brunner 🔨	1	0	0	0	0	X	X	X	1
(Ontario) Jayden King	0	2	3	2	1	X	X	X	8

Sheet D	1	2	3	4	5	6	7	8	Final
(United States) Daniel Casper 🔨	0	3	0	1	0	2	0	2	8
(Czech Republic) Lukáš Klíma	2	0	0	0	2	0	2	0	6

Sheet E	1	2	3	4	5	6	7	8	Final
(Scotland) Kyle Waddell 🔨	3	0	1	0	2	5	X	X	11
(Ontario) Scott Howard	0	2	0	2	0	0	X	X	4

Sheet F	1	2	3	4	5	6	7	8	Final
(Japan) Shinya Abe 🔨	0	1	0	0	0	0	X	X	1
(Scotland) Cameron Bryce	0	0	2	1	1	5	X	X	9

===== Draw 4 =====
Thursday, September 25, 2:30 pm

Sheet A	1	2	3	4	5	6	7	8	Final
(Manitoba) Jordon McDonald	0	3	0	0	1	0	0	0	4
(Japan) Takumi Maeda 🔨	1	0	2	0	0	2	0	1	6

Sheet B	1	2	3	4	5	6	7	8	Final
(United States) John Shuster	0	0	3	0	0	4	X	X	7
(Alberta) Kevin Koe 🔨	1	0	0	1	0	0	X	X	2

===== Draw 5 =====
Thursday, September 25, 5:45 pm

Sheet A	1	2	3	4	5	6	7	8	Final
(Scotland) Kyle Waddell	0	2	0	0	1	0	2	2	7
(Scotland) Cameron Bryce 🔨	3	0	0	1	0	0	0	0	4

Sheet B	1	2	3	4	5	6	7	8	Final
(Japan) Shinya Abe 🔨	1	0	1	0	0	0	X	X	2
(Ontario) Scott Howard	0	2	0	3	1	1	X	X	7

Sheet E	1	2	3	4	5	6	7	8	Final
(Switzerland) Michael Brunner	0	2	0	0	1	0	2	0	5
(Czech Republic) Lukáš Klíma 🔨	2	0	1	1	0	2	0	1	7

Sheet F	1	2	3	4	5	6	7	8	Final
(United States) Daniel Casper	1	0	1	0	1	0	2	0	5
(Ontario) Jayden King 🔨	0	3	0	2	0	1	0	4	10

===== Draw 6 =====
Thursday, September 25, 9:00 pm

Sheet C	1	2	3	4	5	6	7	8	9	Final
(Manitoba) Reid Carruthers	0	2	0	1	0	1	1	0	0	5
(Japan) Team Yamaguchi 🔨	1	0	1	0	2	0	0	1	1	6

Sheet D	1	2	3	4	5	6	7	8	Final
(Ontario) Sam Mooibroek 🔨	3	1	1	0	3	X	X	X	8
(Ontario) Kibo Mulima	0	0	0	2	0	X	X	X	2

===== Draw 7 =====
Friday, September 26, 8:00 am

Sheet A	1	2	3	4	5	6	7	8	9	Final
(Switzerland) Michael Brunner	0	1	0	2	0	2	1	0	1	7
(United States) Daniel Casper 🔨	3	0	1	0	1	0	0	1	0	6

Sheet B	1	2	3	4	5	6	7	8	Final
(Czech Republic) Lukáš Klíma	0	1	0	0	1	0	X	X	2
(Ontario) Jayden King 🔨	1	0	1	3	0	3	X	X	8

Sheet E	1	2	3	4	5	6	7	8	Final
(Scotland) Kyle Waddell	0	1	0	0	1	2	1	1	6
(Japan) Shinya Abe 🔨	1	0	1	1	0	0	0	0	3

Sheet F	1	2	3	4	5	6	7	8	Final
(Scotland) Cameron Bryce 🔨	0	0	3	0	2	0	0	0	5
(Ontario) Scott Howard	2	1	0	2	0	1	1	1	8

===== Draw 8 =====
Friday, September 26, 11:15 am

Sheet E	1	2	3	4	5	6	7	8	Final
(Manitoba) Jordon McDonald	0	2	0	0	1	0	2	0	5
(Alberta) Kevin Koe 🔨	3	0	0	1	0	1	0	2	7

Sheet F	1	2	3	4	5	6	7	8	Final
(United States) John Shuster 🔨	1	0	3	0	1	1	1	X	7
(Japan) Takumi Maeda	0	2	0	1	0	0	0	X	3

===== Draw 9 =====
Friday, September 26, 2:30 pm

Sheet C	1	2	3	4	5	6	7	8	Final
(Ontario) Scott Howard 🔨	2	0	1	0	0	0	X	X	3
(Czech Republic) Lukáš Klíma	0	2	0	2	2	2	X	X	8

Sheet D	1	2	3	4	5	6	7	8	Final
(United States) Daniel Casper 🔨	3	0	2	0	3	X	X	X	8
(Scotland) Cameron Bryce	0	1	0	1	0	X	X	X	2

===== Draw 10 =====
Friday, September 26, 5:45 pm

Sheet A	1	2	3	4	5	6	7	8	Final
(United States) John Shuster 🔨	0	3	0	1	0	2	0	0	6
(Ontario) Kibo Mulima	1	0	1	0	1	0	1	1	5

Sheet B	1	2	3	4	5	6	7	8	Final
(Scotland) Kyle Waddell	2	0	0	3	2	X	X	X	7
(Switzerland) Michael Brunner 🔨	0	2	0	0	0	X	X	X	2

Sheet C	1	2	3	4	5	6	7	8	Final
(Ontario) Sam Mooibroek 🔨	0	1	0	1	0	1	0	X	3
(Manitoba) Jordon McDonald	2	0	1	0	2	0	2	X	7

Sheet D	1	2	3	4	5	6	7	8	Final
(Alberta) Kevin Koe	0	0	2	0	4	0	1	1	8
(Manitoba) Reid Carruthers 🔨	2	0	0	1	0	2	0	0	5

Sheet E	1	2	3	4	5	6	7	8	Final
(Japan) Team Yamaguchi 🔨	0	2	0	2	0	3	0	1	8
(Japan) Takumi Maeda	0	0	2	0	2	0	2	0	6

Sheet F	1	2	3	4	5	6	7	8	Final
(Ontario) Jayden King 🔨	0	0	0	3	0	1	0	0	4
(Japan) Shinya Abe	0	2	0	0	2	0	2	1	7

==== Tiebreaker ====
Saturday, September 27, 8:30 am

Sheet D	1	2	3	4	5	6	7	8	Final
(Czech Republic) Lukáš Klíma 🔨	1	1	0	2	0	0	3	X	7
(Ontario) Scott Howard	0	0	1	0	1	1	0	X	3

==== Playoffs ====
Quarterfinals
1	(Scotland) Kyle Waddell	8
8	(Czech Republic) Lukáš Klíma	3
4	(Ontario) Sam Mooibroek	1
5	(Alberta) Kevin Koe	7
2	(Ontario) Jayden King	3
7	(United States) Daniel Casper	6
3	(United States) John Shuster	7
6	(Japan) Team Yamaguchi	1

Semifinals
1	(Scotland) Kyle Waddell	5
5	(Alberta) Kevin Koe	7
7	(United States) Daniel Casper	4
3	(United States) John Shuster	2

Final
5	(Alberta) Kevin Koe	2
7	(United States) Daniel Casper	4

===== Quarterfinals =====
Saturday, September 27, 12:00 pm

Sheet B	1	2	3	4	5	6	7	8	Final
(Ontario) Sam Mooibroek	0	0	1	0	0	X	X	X	1
(Alberta) Kevin Koe 🔨	1	1	0	4	1	X	X	X	7

Sheet C	1	2	3	4	5	6	7	8	Final
(Scotland) Kyle Waddell 🔨	3	1	0	1	1	0	2	X	8
(Czech Republic) Lukáš Klíma	0	0	2	0	0	1	0	X	3

Sheet D	1	2	3	4	5	6	7	8	Final
(United States) John Shuster 🔨	2	2	0	3	X	X	X	X	7
(Japan) Team Yamaguchi	0	0	1	0	X	X	X	X	1

Sheet E	1	2	3	4	5	6	7	8	Final
(Ontario) Jayden King 🔨	1	0	1	0	1	0	0	X	3
(United States) Daniel Casper	0	2	0	2	0	0	2	X	6

===== Semifinals =====
Saturday, September 27, 7:30 pm

Sheet B	1	2	3	4	5	6	7	8	Final
(United States) Daniel Casper	0	0	0	2	0	0	1	1	4
(United States) John Shuster 🔨	0	2	0	0	0	0	0	0	2

Sheet D	1	2	3	4	5	6	7	8	Final
(Scotland) Kyle Waddell 🔨	0	3	0	0	0	0	2	0	5
(Alberta) Kevin Koe	1	0	0	1	1	1	0	3	7

===== Final =====
Sunday, September 28, 11:30 am

Sheet D	1	2	3	4	5	6	7	8	Final
(Alberta) Kevin Koe 🔨	0	0	0	0	2	0	0	X	2
(United States) Daniel Casper	0	0	0	1	0	2	1	X	4

== Women ==
=== Tier 1 ===
==== Teams ====
The teams are listed as follows:

Skip	Third	Second	Lead	Alternate	Locale
Christina Black	Jill Brothers	Jenn Baxter	Karlee Everist		Halifax, Nova Scotia
Stefania Constantini	Giulia Zardini Lacedelli	Elena Mathis	Marta Lo Deserto (Note: Alternate Marta Lo Deserto played lead, replacing Angela Romei.)		Cortina d'Ampezzo, Italy
Kerri Einarson	Val Sweeting	Shannon Birchard	Karlee Burgess	Krysten Karwacki	Gimli, Manitoba
Satsuki Fujisawa	Chinami Yoshida	Yumi Suzuki	Yurika Yoshida		Kitami, Japan
Gim Eun-ji	Kim Min-ji	Kim Su-ji	Seol Ye-eun	Seol Ye-ji	Uijeongbu, South Korea
Ha Seung-youn	Kim Hye-rin	Yang Tae-i	Kim Su-jin	Park Seo-jin	Chuncheon, South Korea
Anna Hasselborg	Sara McManus	Agnes Knochenhauer	Sofia Scharback	Johanna Heldin	Sundbyberg, Sweden
Rachel Homan	Tracy Fleury	Emma Miskew	Sarah Wilkes		Ottawa, Ontario
Kim Eun-jung	Kim Kyeong-ae	Kim Cho-hi	Kim Yeong-mi (Note: Alternate Kim Yeong-mi played lead, replacing Kim Seon-yeong who was competing on the Ontario mixed doubles tour.)		Gangneung, South Korea
Xenia Schwaller	Selina Gafner	Fabienne Rieder	Selina Rychiger		Zurich, Switzerland
Kayla Skrlik	Margot Flemming	Ashton Skrlik	Geri-Lynn Ramsay	Crystal Rumberg	Calgary, Alberta
Momoha Tabata (Fourth)	Miku Nihira (Skip) (Note: Miku Nihira skipped Team Tabata.)	Sae Yamamoto	Mikoto Nakajima		Sapporo, Japan
Alina Pätz (Fourth)	Silvana Tirinzoni (Skip)	Carole Howald	Selina Witschonke		Aarau, Switzerland
Wang Rui	Han Yu	Dong Ziqi	Jiang Jiayi	Su Tingyu	Beijing, China
Isabella Wranå	Almida de Val	Maria Larsson	Linda Stenlund		Sundbyberg, Sweden
Sayaka Yoshimura	Kaho Onodera	Yuna Kotani	Anna Ohmiya	Mina Kobayashi	Sapporo, Japan

==== Round robin standings ====
Final Round Robin Standings

Key
Teams to Playoffs

Pool A	W	SOW	SOL	L	PF	PA	Pts
(Sweden) Anna Hasselborg	3	0	0	1	20	13	9
(Switzerland) Xenia Schwaller	2	0	0	2	18	19	6
(Manitoba) Kerri Einarson	1	0	0	3	18	27	3
(Italy) Stefania Constantini	1	0	0	3	15	21	3

Pool B	W	SOW	SOL	L	PF	PA	Pts
(Ontario) Rachel Homan	2	2	0	0	28	19	10
(Sweden) Isabella Wranå	2	0	1	1	23	21	7
(Alberta) Kayla Skrlik	1	0	0	3	21	28	3
(Japan) Sayaka Yoshimura	1	0	0	3	18	25	3

Pool C	W	SOW	SOL	L	PF	PA	Pts
(South Korea) Kim Eun-jung	3	0	0	1	22	11	9
(South Korea) Gim Eun-ji	3	0	0	1	26	14	9
(Nova Scotia) Christina Black	1	1	0	2	17	24	5
(South Korea) Ha Seung-youn	1	0	1	2	16	23	4

Pool D	W	SOW	SOL	L	PF	PA	Pts
(Switzerland) Silvana Tirinzoni	4	0	0	0	25	14	12
(Japan) Team Tabata	2	0	1	1	26	22	7
(Japan) Satsuki Fujisawa	1	0	0	3	16	26	3
(China) Wang Rui	0	1	1	2	22	24	3

==== Round robin results ====
All draw times are listed in Eastern Time (UTC−05:00).

===== Draw 1 =====
Tuesday, September 23, 8:00 am

Sheet B	1	2	3	4	5	6	7	8	Final
(Manitoba) Kerri Einarson 🔨	0	0	2	0	0	1	0	1	4
(Switzerland) Xenia Schwaller	0	0	0	2	1	0	2	0	5

Sheet C	1	2	3	4	5	6	7	8	Final
(Japan) Satsuki Fujisawa	0	2	0	0	0	2	0	X	4
(Japan) Team Tabata 🔨	1	0	2	0	1	0	4	X	8

===== Draw 2 =====
Tuesday, September 23, 11:30 am

Sheet B	1	2	3	4	5	6	7	8	Final
(South Korea) Kim Eun-jung	0	2	1	0	2	0	0	0	5
(Nova Scotia) Christina Black 🔨	3	0	0	1	0	1	1	1	7

Sheet C	1	2	3	4	5	6	7	8	Final
(Japan) Sayaka Yoshimura	0	1	0	2	1	1	0	1	6
(Sweden) Isabella Wranå 🔨	0	0	3	0	0	0	2	0	5

===== Draw 3 =====
Tuesday, September 23, 3:00 pm

Sheet B	1	2	3	4	5	6	7	8	Final
(South Korea) Gim Eun-ji 🔨	1	0	1	0	1	0	3	X	6
(South Korea) Ha Seung-youn	0	3	0	0	0	1	0	X	4

Sheet C	1	2	3	4	5	6	7	8	Final
(Switzerland) Silvana Tirinzoni 🔨	1	0	2	0	1	0	0	1	5
(China) Wang Rui	0	1	0	1	0	1	1	0	4

===== Draw 4 =====
Tuesday, September 23, 6:30 pm

Sheet B	1	2	3	4	5	6	7	8	Final
(Sweden) Anna Hasselborg 🔨	0	0	1	0	1	0	0	3	5
(Italy) Stefania Constantini	0	0	0	0	0	1	1	0	2

Sheet C	1	2	3	4	5	6	7	8	Final
(Ontario) Rachel Homan	0	1	0	2	0	2	0	2	7
(Alberta) Kayla Skrlik 🔨	0	0	2	0	1	0	1	0	4

===== Draw 5 =====
Wednesday, September 24, 8:00 am

Sheet A	1	2	3	4	5	6	7	8	Final
(South Korea) Kim Eun-jung	1	1	0	1	2	1	X	X	6
(South Korea) Ha Seung-youn 🔨	0	0	0	0	0	0	X	X	0

Sheet D	1	2	3	4	5	6	7	8	Final
(Japan) Satsuki Fujisawa	0	0	1	0	1	0	2	1	5
(China) Wang Rui 🔨	1	1	0	1	0	1	0	0	4

===== Draw 6 =====
Wednesday, September 24, 11:30 am

Sheet A	1	2	3	4	5	6	7	8	Final
(Manitoba) Kerri Einarson 🔨	1	1	3	0	0	0	1	1	7
(Italy) Stefania Constantini	0	0	0	2	2	1	0	0	5

Sheet D	1	2	3	4	5	6	7	8	Final
(Switzerland) Silvana Tirinzoni	1	1	0	1	0	0	1	3	7
(Japan) Team Tabata 🔨	0	0	1	0	1	1	0	0	3

===== Draw 7 =====
Wednesday, September 24, 3:30 pm

Sheet A	1	2	3	4	5	6	7	8	Final
(South Korea) Gim Eun-ji	0	0	3	0	2	1	1	X	7
(Nova Scotia) Christina Black 🔨	1	0	0	1	0	0	0	X	2

Sheet D	1	2	3	4	5	6	7	8	9	Final
(Ontario) Rachel Homan 🔨	0	1	0	2	1	0	0	1	1	6
(Sweden) Isabella Wranå	0	0	3	0	0	1	1	0	0	5

===== Draw 8 =====
Wednesday, September 24, 7:30 pm

Sheet A	1	2	3	4	5	6	7	8	Final
(Sweden) Anna Hasselborg	0	1	0	0	0	1	X	X	2
(Switzerland) Xenia Schwaller 🔨	1	0	2	2	2	0	X	X	7

Sheet D	1	2	3	4	5	6	7	8	Final
(Japan) Sayaka Yoshimura 🔨	1	0	0	1	0	2	1	0	5
(Alberta) Kayla Skrlik	0	1	0	0	3	0	0	4	8

===== Draw 9 =====
Thursday, September 25, 8:00 am

Sheet A	1	2	3	4	5	6	7	8	9	Final
(Japan) Team Tabata	0	1	0	2	1	0	2	0	0	6
(China) Wang Rui 🔨	0	0	3	0	0	1	0	2	1	7

Sheet D	1	2	3	4	5	6	7	8	9	Final
(South Korea) Ha Seung-youn	2	0	0	0	2	0	1	1	0	6
(Nova Scotia) Christina Black 🔨	0	2	0	2	0	2	0	0	1	7

===== Draw 10 =====
Thursday, September 25, 11:30 am

Sheet A	1	2	3	4	5	6	7	8	Final
(Sweden) Isabella Wranå	3	0	0	1	0	2	0	1	7
(Alberta) Kayla Skrlik 🔨	0	0	2	0	2	0	1	0	5

Sheet D	1	2	3	4	5	6	7	8	Final
(Switzerland) Xenia Schwaller	0	0	1	0	0	1	0	X	2
(Italy) Stefania Constantini 🔨	2	2	0	0	2	0	1	X	7

===== Draw 11 =====
Thursday, September 25, 3:30 pm

Sheet A	1	2	3	4	5	6	7	8	Final
(Switzerland) Silvana Tirinzoni 🔨	0	2	0	4	1	0	1	X	8
(Japan) Satsuki Fujisawa	0	0	1	0	0	2	0	X	3

Sheet B	1	2	3	4	5	6	7	8	Final
(Ontario) Rachel Homan 🔨	0	1	0	1	0	3	2	X	7
(Japan) Sayaka Yoshimura	0	0	1	0	2	0	0	X	3

Sheet D	1	2	3	4	5	6	7	8	Final
(Sweden) Anna Hasselborg 🔨	0	1	0	2	0	3	1	X	7
(Manitoba) Kerri Einarson	1	0	1	0	1	0	0	X	3

===== Draw 12 =====
Thursday, September 25, 7:30 pm

Sheet D	1	2	3	4	5	6	7	8	Final
(South Korea) Kim Eun-jung 🔨	0	0	0	2	0	0	1	1	4
(South Korea) Gim Eun-ji	0	0	0	0	1	2	0	0	3

===== Draw 13 =====
Friday, September 26, 8:00 am

Sheet A	1	2	3	4	5	6	7	8	Final
(Japan) Team Tabata 🔨	2	0	1	0	3	0	3	X	9
(Alberta) Kayla Skrlik	0	1	0	1	0	2	0	X	4

Sheet B	1	2	3	4	5	6	7	8	Final
(Switzerland) Silvana Tirinzoni	1	0	0	1	1	0	0	2	5
(Japan) Sayaka Yoshimura 🔨	0	2	0	0	0	1	1	0	4

Sheet C	1	2	3	4	5	6	7	8	Final
(Switzerland) Xenia Schwaller 🔨	0	0	2	0	0	2	0	0	4
(South Korea) Ha Seung-youn	0	1	0	2	0	0	1	2	6

===== Draw 14 =====
Friday, September 26, 11:30 am

Sheet C	1	2	3	4	5	6	7	8	Final
(South Korea) Gim Eun-ji 🔨	4	2	0	0	2	2	X	X	10
(Manitoba) Kerri Einarson	0	0	2	2	0	0	X	X	4

Sheet D	1	2	3	4	5	6	7	8	Final
(Sweden) Isabella Wranå 🔨	1	0	0	1	0	1	1	2	6
(Japan) Satsuki Fujisawa	0	1	0	0	3	0	0	0	4

===== Draw 16 =====
Friday, September 26, 7:30 pm

Sheet A	1	2	3	4	5	6	7	8	Final
(South Korea) Kim Eun-jung 🔨	2	1	0	1	1	2	X	X	7
(Italy) Stefania Constantini	0	0	1	0	0	0	X	X	1

Sheet C	1	2	3	4	5	6	7	8	9	Final
(Ontario) Rachel Homan 🔨	2	0	1	0	3	0	1	0	1	8
(China) Wang Rui	0	2	0	3	0	1	0	1	0	7

Sheet D	1	2	3	4	5	6	7	8	Final
(Sweden) Anna Hasselborg 🔨	1	0	1	0	2	1	1	X	6
(Nova Scotia) Christina Black	0	0	0	1	0	0	0	X	1

==== Playoffs ====
Quarterfinals
1	(Switzerland) Silvana Tirinzoni	5
8	(Switzerland) Xenia Schwaller	4
4	(South Korea) Kim Eun-jung	0
5	(South Korea) Gim Eun-ji	7
2	(Ontario) Rachel Homan	6
7	(Japan) Team Tabata	4
3	(Sweden) Anna Hasselborg	3
6	(Sweden) Isabella Wranå	8

Semifinals
1	(Switzerland) Silvana Tirinzoni	6
5	(South Korea) Gim Eun-ji	3
2	(Ontario) Rachel Homan	7
6	(Sweden) Isabella Wranå	5

Final
1	(Switzerland) Silvana Tirinzoni	4
2	(Ontario) Rachel Homan	6

===== Quarterfinals =====
Saturday, September 27, 3:30 pm

Sheet A	1	2	3	4	5	6	7	8	Final
(Sweden) Anna Hasselborg 🔨	0	0	3	0	0	0	0	0	3
(Sweden) Isabella Wranå	1	3	0	1	0	1	1	1	8

Sheet B	1	2	3	4	5	6	7	8	Final
(South Korea) Kim Eun-jung	0	0	0	0	0	0	X	X	0
(South Korea) Gim Eun-ji 🔨	0	1	2	1	1	2	X	X	7

Sheet C	1	2	3	4	5	6	7	8	9	Final
(Ontario) Rachel Homan 🔨	0	1	0	1	0	0	2	0	2	6
(Japan) Team Tabata	0	0	1	0	1	0	0	2	0	4

Sheet D	1	2	3	4	5	6	7	8	9	Final
(Switzerland) Silvana Tirinzoni 🔨	0	1	0	2	0	1	0	0	1	5
(Switzerland) Xenia Schwaller	0	0	1	0	1	0	0	2	0	4

===== Semifinals =====
Saturday, September 27, 7:30 pm

Sheet C	1	2	3	4	5	6	7	8	Final
(Switzerland) Silvana Tirinzoni 🔨	0	2	0	1	0	0	2	1	6
(South Korea) Gim Eun-ji	0	0	2	0	1	0	0	0	3

Sheet D	1	2	3	4	5	6	7	8	Final
(Ontario) Rachel Homan 🔨	2	1	0	1	0	1	0	2	7
(Sweden) Isabella Wranå	0	0	2	0	2	0	1	0	5

===== Final =====
Sunday, September 28, 3:30 pm

Sheet C	1	2	3	4	5	6	7	8	Final
(Switzerland) Silvana Tirinzoni 🔨	1	0	0	2	0	0	1	X	4
(Ontario) Rachel Homan	0	1	1	0	2	2	0	X	6

=== Tier 2 ===
==== Teams ====
The teams are listed as follows:

Skip	Third	Second	Lead	Alternate	Locale
Emma Artichuk	Sarah Bailey	Scotia Maltman	Tori Zemmelink	Logan Shaw	Waterloo, Ontario
Corryn Brown	Erin Pincott	Sarah Koltun	Samantha Fisher		Kamloops, British Columbia
Kate Cameron	Briane Harris	Taylor McDonald	Mackenzie Elias		Winnipeg, Manitoba
Madeleine Dupont	Mathilde Halse	Jasmin Holtermann (Note: Alternate Jasmin Holtermann spared for My Larsen. She played second while Denise Dupont played lead.)	Denise Dupont		Hvidovre, Denmark
Fay Henderson	Lisa Davie	Hailey Duff	Katie McMillan	Laura Watt	Stirling, Scotland
Corrie Hürlimann	Marina Lörtscher	Stefanie Berset	Celine Schwizgebel		Zug, Switzerland
Danielle Inglis	Kira Brunton	Calissa Daly	Cassandra de Groot	Kim Tuck	Ottawa, Ontario
Kang Bo-bae	Shim Yu-jeong	Kim Min-seo	Kim Ji-soo	Lee Bo-young	Jeonbuk, South Korea
Ikue Kitazawa	Seina Nakajima	Minori Suzuki	Hasumi Ishigooka		Nagano, Japan
Kaitlyn Lawes (Fourth)	Selena Njegovan (Skip) (Note: Selena Njegovan skipped Team Lawes.)	Jocelyn Peterman	Kristin Gordon		Winnipeg, Manitoba
Kayla MacMillan	Brittany Tran	Lindsay Dubue	Sarah Loken	Lauren Lenentine	Victoria, British Columbia
Rebecca Morrison (Fourth)	Jennifer Dodds	Sophie Sinclair	Sophie Jackson (Skip) (Note: Sophie Jackson skipped Team Morrison.)		Stirling, Scotland
Beth Peterson	Kelsey Calvert	Katherine Remillard	Melissa Gordon-Kurz		Winnipeg, Manitoba
Tabitha Peterson	Cory Thiesse	Tara Peterson	Taylor Anderson-Heide		(United States) Saint Paul, Minnesota
Chelsea Principi	Lauren Peskett	Brenda Chapman	Keira McLaughlin		Niagara Falls, Ontario
Delaney Strouse (Fourth)	Anne O'Hara	Sydney Mullaney	Madison Bear (Skip) (Note: Madison Bear skipped Team Strouse.)		(United States) Traverse City, Michigan

==== Round robin standings ====
Final Round Robin Standings

Key
Teams to Playoffs
Teams to Tiebreaker

Pool A	W	SOW	SOL	L	PF	PA	Pts
(Japan) Ikue Kitazawa	3	1	0	0	32	13	11
(Switzerland) Corrie Hürlimann	3	0	1	0	26	14	10
(Ontario) Emma Artichuk	1	0	0	3	16	28	3
(Scotland) Fay Henderson	0	0	0	4	11	28	0

Pool B	W	SOW	SOL	L	PF	PA	Pts
(Denmark) Madeleine Dupont	3	0	0	1	25	19	9
(Scotland) Team Morrison	3	0	0	1	27	18	9
(Manitoba) Beth Peterson	1	0	0	3	17	30	3
(Ontario) Chelsea Principi	0	0	0	4	21	25	0

Pool C	W	SOW	SOL	L	PF	PA	Pts
(Manitoba) Kate Cameron	3	0	1	0	24	16	10
(British Columbia) Kayla MacMillan	3	0	0	1	27	13	9
(United States) Team Strouse	0	2	0	2	15	25	4
(British Columbia) Corryn Brown	0	0	1	3	12	26	1

Pool D	W	SOW	SOL	L	PF	PA	Pts
(Manitoba) Team Lawes	3	0	0	1	20	23	9
(United States) Tabitha Peterson	1	2	0	1	28	26	7
(South Korea) Kang Bo-bae	2	0	1	1	27	17	7
(Ontario) Danielle Inglis	1	0	1	2	23	28	4

==== Round robin results ====
All draw times are listed in Eastern Time (UTC−05:00).

===== Draw 1 =====
Wednesday, September 24, 6:30 pm

Sheet A	1	2	3	4	5	6	7	8	Final
(Japan) Ikue Kitazawa 🔨	2	1	6	0	3	X	X	X	12
(Ontario) Emma Artichuk	0	0	0	1	0	X	X	X	1

Sheet B	1	2	3	4	5	6	7	8	Final
(Scotland) Fay Henderson	0	0	1	0	0	2	0	X	3
(Switzerland) Corrie Hürlimann 🔨	0	2	0	2	3	0	0	X	7

Sheet C	1	2	3	4	5	6	7	8	Final
(Manitoba) Kate Cameron 🔨	2	0	2	1	1	0	1	0	7
(British Columbia) Kayla MacMillan	0	1	0	0	0	3	0	1	5

Sheet D	1	2	3	4	5	6	7	8	9	Final
(British Columbia) Corryn Brown 🔨	0	0	2	0	2	0	0	1	0	5
(United States) Team Strouse	2	1	0	1	0	1	0	0	1	6

===== Draw 2 =====
Thursday, September 25, 8:00 am

Sheet A	1	2	3	4	5	6	7	8	Final
(Scotland) Team Morrison	0	0	1	0	0	1	1	2	5
(Ontario) Chelsea Principi 🔨	2	0	0	1	1	0	0	0	4

Sheet B	1	2	3	4	5	6	7	8	Final
(Manitoba) Beth Peterson	0	0	1	0	0	0	X	X	1
(Denmark) Madeleine Dupont 🔨	3	0	0	2	1	2	X	X	8

Sheet C	1	2	3	4	5	6	7	8	Final
(Manitoba) Team Lawes 🔨	0	1	0	3	1	1	0	1	7
(Ontario) Danielle Inglis	0	0	2	0	0	0	2	0	4

Sheet D	1	2	3	4	5	6	7	8	9	Final
(South Korea) Kang Bo-bae 🔨	1	1	1	0	2	0	0	1	0	6
(United States) Tabitha Peterson	0	0	0	3	0	2	1	0	1	7

===== Draw 4 =====
Thursday, September 25, 2:30 pm

Sheet C	1	2	3	4	5	6	7	8	9	Final
(Japan) Ikue Kitazawa	0	1	1	0	0	3	0	0	1	6
(Switzerland) Corrie Hürlimann 🔨	1	0	0	1	0	0	2	1	0	5

Sheet D	1	2	3	4	5	6	7	8	Final
(Scotland) Fay Henderson 🔨	0	0	0	0	0	2	0	X	2
(Ontario) Emma Artichuk	0	1	2	3	1	0	1	X	8

Sheet E	1	2	3	4	5	6	7	8	9	Final
(Manitoba) Kate Cameron 🔨	0	2	0	2	0	1	0	0	0	5
(United States) Team Strouse	0	0	2	0	0	0	2	1	1	6

Sheet F	1	2	3	4	5	6	7	8	Final
(British Columbia) Corryn Brown 🔨	1	0	0	0	0	0	X	X	1
(British Columbia) Kayla MacMillan	0	2	1	1	2	1	X	X	7

===== Draw 5 =====
Thursday, September 25, 5:45 pm

Sheet C	1	2	3	4	5	6	7	8	Final
(Scotland) Team Morrison	0	0	0	2	2	0	1	0	5
(Denmark) Madeleine Dupont 🔨	0	2	2	0	0	2	0	1	7

Sheet D	1	2	3	4	5	6	7	8	Final
(Manitoba) Beth Peterson 🔨	1	0	3	0	0	2	0	1	7
(Ontario) Chelsea Principi	0	3	0	1	1	0	1	0	6

===== Draw 6 =====
Thursday, September 25, 9:00 pm

Sheet A	1	2	3	4	5	6	7	8	Final
(Manitoba) Team Lawes	0	0	1	0	3	0	0	3	7
(United States) Tabitha Peterson 🔨	0	1	0	2	0	2	0	0	5

Sheet B	1	2	3	4	5	6	7	8	Final
(South Korea) Kang Bo-bae 🔨	0	2	1	0	0	0	1	1	5
(Ontario) Danielle Inglis	0	0	0	2	2	3	0	0	7

Sheet E	1	2	3	4	5	6	7	8	Final
(Japan) Ikue Kitazawa	0	0	1	1	0	2	2	X	6
(Scotland) Fay Henderson 🔨	1	1	0	0	1	0	0	X	3

Sheet F	1	2	3	4	5	6	7	8	Final
(Switzerland) Corrie Hürlimann	0	0	3	0	1	0	1	1	6
(Ontario) Emma Artichuk 🔨	0	1	0	2	0	1	0	0	4

===== Draw 7 =====
Friday, September 26, 8:00 am

Sheet C	1	2	3	4	5	6	7	8	Final
(Manitoba) Kate Cameron 🔨	0	0	1	0	0	2	1	1	5
(British Columbia) Corryn Brown	0	0	0	1	1	0	0	0	2

Sheet D	1	2	3	4	5	6	7	8	Final
(United States) Team Strouse	0	0	0	0	2	0	0	X	2
(British Columbia) Kayla MacMillan 🔨	1	1	1	0	0	3	1	X	7

===== Draw 8 =====
Friday, September 26, 11:15 am

Sheet A	1	2	3	4	5	6	7	8	Final
(Scotland) Team Morrison	0	2	2	0	2	1	1	X	8
(Manitoba) Beth Peterson 🔨	1	0	0	2	0	0	0	X	3

Sheet B	1	2	3	4	5	6	7	8	Final
(Denmark) Madeleine Dupont 🔨	1	1	0	3	1	0	0	1	7
(Ontario) Chelsea Principi	0	0	2	0	0	3	1	0	6

Sheet C	1	2	3	4	5	6	7	8	Final
(Manitoba) Team Lawes	0	0	0	0	0	X	X	X	0
(South Korea) Kang Bo-bae 🔨	2	3	1	1	2	X	X	X	9

Sheet D	1	2	3	4	5	6	7	8	9	Final
(United States) Tabitha Peterson	0	0	2	2	0	1	2	0	1	8
(Ontario) Danielle Inglis 🔨	0	2	0	0	1	0	0	4	0	7

===== Draw 9 =====
Friday, September 26, 2:30 pm

Sheet A	1	2	3	4	5	6	7	8	Final
(Switzerland) Corrie Hürlimann 🔨	0	1	1	1	0	5	X	X	8
(United States) Team Strouse	0	0	0	0	1	0	X	X	1

Sheet B	1	2	3	4	5	6	7	8	Final
(Japan) Ikue Kitazawa 🔨	0	2	0	2	1	0	4	X	8
(British Columbia) Corryn Brown	1	0	1	0	0	3	0	X	5

Sheet E	1	2	3	4	5	6	7	8	Final
(British Columbia) Kayla MacMillan	1	0	4	0	0	2	1	X	8
(Ontario) Emma Artichuk 🔨	0	1	0	2	0	0	0	X	3

Sheet F	1	2	3	4	5	6	7	8	Final
(Manitoba) Kate Cameron 🔨	1	1	0	1	1	1	0	2	7
(Scotland) Fay Henderson	0	0	1	0	0	0	2	0	3

===== Draw 11 =====
Friday, September 26, 9:00 pm

Sheet C	1	2	3	4	5	6	7	8	Final
(United States) Tabitha Peterson 🔨	1	0	1	2	0	3	0	1	8
(Manitoba) Beth Peterson	0	1	0	0	2	0	3	0	6

Sheet D	1	2	3	4	5	6	7	8	Final
(Denmark) Madeleine Dupont	0	0	0	2	0	1	0	X	3
(South Korea) Kang Bo-bae 🔨	1	2	1	0	1	0	2	X	7

Sheet E	1	2	3	4	5	6	7	8	Final
(Manitoba) Team Lawes	0	3	0	1	0	0	0	2	6
(Ontario) Chelsea Principi 🔨	2	0	1	0	0	1	1	0	5

Sheet F	1	2	3	4	5	6	7	8	Final
(Scotland) Team Morrison	0	2	0	0	2	1	1	3	9
(Ontario) Danielle Inglis 🔨	1	0	2	1	0	0	0	0	4

==== Tiebreaker ====
Saturday, September 27, 8:30 am

Sheet E	1	2	3	4	5	6	7	8	9	Final
(United States) Tabitha Peterson 🔨	0	1	1	0	0	0	1	0	1	4
(South Korea) Kang Bo-bae	0	0	0	1	1	0	0	1	0	3

==== Playoffs ====
Quarterfinals
1	(Japan) Ikue Kitazawa	5
8	(United States) Tabitha Peterson	3
4	(Denmark) Madeleine Dupont	6
5	(Manitoba) Team Lawes	4
2	(Switzerland) Corrie Hürlimann	7
7	(Scotland) Team Morrison	8
3	(Manitoba) Kate Cameron	3
6	(British Columbia) Kayla MacMillan	6

Semifinals
1	(Japan) Ikue Kitazawa	6
4	(Denmark) Madeleine Dupont	1
7	(Scotland) Team Morrison	6
6	(British Columbia) Kayla MacMillan	2

Final
1	(Japan) Ikue Kitazawa	6
7	(Scotland) Team Morrison	5

===== Quarterfinals =====
Saturday, September 27, 3:30 pm

Sheet A	1	2	3	4	5	6	7	8	Final
(Switzerland) Corrie Hürlimann 🔨	2	0	0	1	0	0	2	2	7
(Scotland) Team Morrison	0	2	2	0	0	4	0	0	8

Sheet B	1	2	3	4	5	6	7	8	Final
(Denmark) Madeleine Dupont	0	0	2	0	1	2	0	1	6
(Manitoba) Team Lawes 🔨	0	1	0	1	0	0	2	0	4

Sheet C	1	2	3	4	5	6	7	8	Final
(Manitoba) Kate Cameron	1	0	1	1	0	0	0	X	3
(British Columbia) Kayla MacMillan	0	2	0	0	1	1	2	X	6

Sheet D	1	2	3	4	5	6	7	8	Final
(Japan) Ikue Kitazawa 🔨	0	2	0	1	0	1	0	1	5
(United States) Tabitha Peterson	0	0	2	0	0	0	1	0	3

===== Semifinals =====
Saturday, September 27, 7:30 pm

Sheet A	1	2	3	4	5	6	7	8	Final
(Japan) Ikue Kitazawa 🔨	1	1	0	1	1	1	1	X	6
(Denmark) Madeleine Dupont	0	0	1	0	0	0	0	X	1

Sheet C	1	2	3	4	5	6	7	8	Final
(Scotland) Team Morrison 🔨	0	0	2	0	2	0	2	X	6
(British Columbia) Kayla MacMillan	0	0	0	1	0	1	0	X	2

===== Final =====
Sunday, September 28, 3:30 pm

Sheet D	1	2	3	4	5	6	7	8	9	Final
(Japan) Ikue Kitazawa 🔨	0	2	0	1	0	0	2	0	1	6
(Scotland) Team Morrison	0	0	2	0	1	1	0	1	0	5
