= 1939 Macdonald Brier =

Canadian men's curling championship

- Host city: Toronto, Ontario
- Arena: Granite Curling Club
- Dates: March 5–9
- Winner: Ontario
- Curling club: Kitchener Granite CC, Kitchener
- Skip: Bert Hall
- Third: Perry Hall
- Second: Ernie Parkes
- Lead: Campbell Seagram
- Finalist: Manitoba (Ross Kennedy)

The 1939 Macdonald Brier, the Canadian men's national curling championship, was held from March 5 to 9, 1939 at the Granite Club in Toronto, Ontario.

Both Team Manitoba and Team Ontario finished round robin play with 8-1 records, necessitating a tiebreaker playoff for the Brier championship. Ontario, skipped by Bert Hall, won the tiebreaker game over Manitoba 12-10 to capture Ontario's second Brier Tankard.

== Event Summary ==
After the sixth draw, there were five teams that had a chance at winning the Brier: British Columbia, Manitoba, Northern Ontario, Ontario, and Saskatchewan. Both British Columbia and Ontario were undefeated at 6-0 while Manitoba and Northern Ontario had one loss each, and Saskatchewan with two losses.

Both undefeated teams and one loss teams would play each other in the next draw (Draw 7) with Ontario would win the battle of unbeatens over British Columbia 13-8 while Manitoba edged Northern Ontario 11-10. In the next draw, Northern Ontario eliminated Saskatchewan 9-8, but were eliminated themselves when Manitoba beat British Columbia 14-7 while Ontario remained unbeaten with a 13-8 win over Alberta.

With one draw remaining, Ontario only needed a win or a Manitoba loss to Saskatchewan to clinch the Brier while Manitoba had to win and hope Ontario would lose to Northern Ontario to force a playoff. Manitoba's wishes came true as they held off Saskatchewan 12-10 and Northern Ontario handed Ontario a 13-5 defeat forcing a tiebreaker game between Ontario and Manitoba as they both finished 8-1 in round robin play.

In the playoff, Ontario would jump out to a 7-2 lead after the fourth end. But Manitoba would charge back and after a steal of one in the tenth, Manitoba cut the lead to 10-9 with two ends left. Ontario pulled away and scored two in the eleventh. With Manitoba only scoring one in the last end, Ontario clinched the Brier Tankard for the second time.

== Teams ==
The teams are listed as follows:

Alberta	British Columbia	Manitoba	New Brunswick	Northern Ontario
Calgary CC, Calgary Skip: Howard Palmer; Third: Jacob Curliss; Second: Ernest Irving; Lead: St. Clair Webb	Hasting CC, Vancouver Skip: Roland David; Third: Francis Avery; Second: Roland Wickstrom; Lead: George Law	Strathcona CC, Winnipeg Skip: Ross Kennedy; Third: William MacDonald; Second: Robert Hume; Lead: Clair Wells	Fredericton CC, Fredericton Skip: Walter Limerick; Third: Arthur Limerick; Second: Victor Limerick; Lead: James Howie	Haileybury CC, Haileybury Skip: Daniel Millar; Third: Duncan Sutherland; Second: William Beecroft; Lead: Lorne Umphrey
Nova Scotia	Ontario	Prince Edward Island	Quebec	Saskatchewan
Mayflower CC, Halifax Skip: Charles Durrant; Third: Frank Arthur; Second: John Wood; Lead: Horton Norman	Kitchener Granite CC, Kitchener Skip: Bert Hall; Third: Perry Hall; Second: Ernie Parkes; Lead: Campbell Seagram	Charlottetown CC, Charlottetown Skip: Rankine McLaine; Third: Gordon Hughes; Second: Heath McIntrye; Lead: Charles Williams	Quebec CC, Quebec City Skip: Robert Cream; Third: Edward Thompson; Second: Edward Ployart; Lead: Samuel Trueman	Prince Albert CC, Prince Albert Skip: George Dunbar; Third: John Brower; Second: Robert Glass; Lead: James McNeill

== Round Robin standings ==
Key
Teams to Tiebreaker

Province	Skip	W	L	PF	PA
Ontario	Bert Hall	8	1	105	66
Manitoba	Ross Kennedy	8	1	113	65
British Columbia	Roland David	7	2	105	79
Northern Ontario	Daniel Millar	7	2	107	76
Saskatchewan	George Dunbar	5	4	96	81
Alberta	Howard Palmer	4	5	87	85
Nova Scotia	Charles Durrant	3	6	79	108
New Brunswick	Walter Limerick	2	7	68	101
Prince Edward Island	Rankine McLaine	1	8	72	127
Quebec	Robert Cream	0	9	71	115

== Round Robin results ==
=== Draw 1 ===
Sheet A	1	2	3	4	5	6	7	8	9	10	11	12	Final
Prince Edward Island (McLaine)	0	1	2	0	0	0	1	0	0	0	0	0	4
British Columbia (David)	4	0	0	1	2	4	0	3	2	1	1	3	21

Sheet B	1	2	3	4	5	6	7	8	9	10	11	12	Final
Nova Scotia (Durrant)	0	1	0	1	0	1	0	1	0	0	1	0	5
Ontario (Hall)	1	0	1	0	1	0	1	0	2	3	0	2	11

Sheet C	1	2	3	4	5	6	7	8	9	10	11	12	Final
New Brunswick (Limerick)	0	2	0	1	0	0	0	2	1	0	0	0	6
Northern Ontario (Millar)	1	0	3	0	2	1	1	0	0	1	1	3	13

Sheet D	1	2	3	4	5	6	7	8	9	10	11	12	Final
Alberta (Palmer)	2	0	1	1	0	2	2	0	0	0	2	0	10
Saskatchewan (Dunbar)	0	1	0	0	1	0	0	5	3	1	0	1	12

Sheet E	1	2	3	4	5	6	7	8	9	10	11	12	Final
Quebec (Cream)	0	1	0	0	1	0	1	0	2	1	0	0	6
Manitoba (Kennedy)	4	0	2	2	0	3	0	3	0	0	5	1	20

=== Draw 2 ===
Sheet A	1	2	3	4	5	6	7	8	9	10	11	12	Final
Nova Scotia (Durrant)	1	1	0	1	1	0	1	1	0	1	1	0	8
British Columbia (David)	0	0	1	0	0	4	0	0	4	0	0	2	11

Sheet B	1	2	3	4	5	6	7	8	9	10	11	12	Final
Saskatchewan (Dunbar)	0	2	0	0	3	0	4	2	0	2	0	0	13
Prince Edward Island (McLaine)	1	0	2	1	0	1	0	0	1	0	1	1	8

Sheet C	1	2	3	4	5	6	7	8	9	10	11	12	Final
Ontario (Hall)	0	0	1	1	1	2	0	3	1	1	0	3	13
Quebec (Cream)	1	1	0	0	0	0	1	0	0	0	3	0	6

Sheet D	1	2	3	4	5	6	7	8	9	10	11	12	Final
Manitoba (Kennedy)	1	1	1	0	0	3	1	0	1	1	0	1	10
New Brunswick (Limerick)	0	0	0	1	0	0	0	1	0	0	2	0	4

Sheet E	1	2	3	4	5	6	7	8	9	10	11	12	Final
Northern Ontario (Millar)	1	0	2	0	1	0	1	0	2	2	1	0	10
Alberta (Palmer)	0	2	0	1	0	2	0	3	0	0	0	1	9

=== Draw 3 ===
Sheet A	1	2	3	4	5	6	7	8	9	10	11	12	13	Final
British Columbia (David)	3	0	0	1	2	0	0	1	0	0	1	0	2	10
Quebec (Cream)	0	2	0	0	0	2	1	0	1	0	0	2	0	8

Sheet B	1	2	3	4	5	6	7	8	9	10	11	12	Final
Northern Ontario (Millar)	1	2	0	4	0	2	2	1	2	0	3	0	17
Prince Edward Island (McLaine)	0	0	1	0	1	0	0	0	0	5	0	1	8

Sheet C	1	2	3	4	5	6	7	8	9	10	11	12	Final
New Brunswick (Limerick)	0	0	0	0	1	0	0	1	0	1	1	0	4
Ontario (Hall)	2	0	2	3	0	4	1	0	1	0	0	2	15

Sheet D	1	2	3	4	5	6	7	8	9	10	11	12	Final
Nova Scotia (Durrant)	1	0	0	1	0	0	0	0	0	1	2	0	5
Saskatchewan (Dunbar)	0	3	1	0	1	3	1	1	2	0	0	2	14

Sheet E	1	2	3	4	5	6	7	8	9	10	11	12	Final
Alberta (Palmer)	0	0	1	0	1	1	0	3	0	0	1	1	8
Manitoba (Kennedy)	2	1	0	2	0	0	1	0	2	1	0	0	9

=== Draw 4 ===
Sheet A	1	2	3	4	5	6	7	8	9	10	11	12	Final
Manitoba (Kennedy)	1	0	4	0	1	1	0	3	1	0	2	3	16
Nova Scotia (Durrant)	0	2	0	1	0	0	1	0	0	1	0	0	5

Sheet B	1	2	3	4	5	6	7	8	9	10	11	12	Final
British Columbia (David)	0	2	0	1	0	4	1	0	0	1	1	0	10
Alberta (Palmer)	2	0	1	0	1	0	0	1	1	0	0	1	7

Sheet C	1	2	3	4	5	6	7	8	9	10	11	12	Final
Quebec (Cream)	0	4	0	0	2	2	0	0	0	0	1	0	9
Northern Ontario (Millar)	1	0	0	1	0	0	1	0	2	4	0	3	12

Sheet D	1	2	3	4	5	6	7	8	9	10	11	12	Final
Prince Edward Island (McLaine)	0	1	1	0	2	0	0	3	0	0	2	0	9
Ontario (Hall)	1	0	0	2	0	3	5	0	1	3	0	3	18

Sheet E	1	2	3	4	5	6	7	8	9	10	11	12	Final
New Brunswick (Limerick)	1	0	2	0	1	0	0	0	0	1	0	2	7
Saskatchewan (Dunbar)	0	1	0	1	0	1	2	1	2	0	2	0	10

=== Draw 5 ===
Sheet A	1	2	3	4	5	6	7	8	9	10	11	12	Final
New Brunswick (Limerick)	0	2	0	2	0	0	0	0	0	5	1	1	11
Nova Scotia (Durrant)	4	0	3	0	1	1	0	2	2	0	0	0	13

Sheet B	1	2	3	4	5	6	7	8	9	10	11	12	Final
Manitoba (Kennedy)	3	3	0	0	2	1	1	0	1	3	0	2	16
Prince Edward Island (McLaine)	0	0	1	3	0	0	0	2	0	0	1	0	7

Sheet C	1	2	3	4	5	6	7	8	9	10	11	12	Final
Quebec (Cream)	1	0	2	1	2	0	0	0	1	0	2	0	9
Alberta (Palmer)	0	1	0	0	0	2	1	1	0	1	0	4	10

Sheet D	1	2	3	4	5	6	7	8	9	10	11	12	Final
British Columbia (David)	0	3	1	2	0	4	0	1	0	3	0	0	14
Northern Ontario (Millar)	1	0	0	0	1	0	3	0	3	0	2	0	10

Sheet E	1	2	3	4	5	6	7	8	9	10	11	12	Final
Ontario (Hall)	1	0	0	3	1	0	2	1	0	1	0	0	9
Saskatchewan (Dunbar)	0	0	1	0	0	3	0	0	1	0	2	1	8

=== Draw 6 ===
Sheet A	1	2	3	4	5	6	7	8	9	10	11	12	Final
Nova Scotia (Durrant)	0	0	0	2	1	0	1	1	0	0	1	0	6
Northern Ontario (Millar)	1	2	2	0	0	2	0	0	4	2	0	0	13

Sheet B	1	2	3	4	5	6	7	8	9	10	11	12	Final
Quebec (Cream)	1	0	0	0	1	2	1	0	1	1	0	0	7
New Brunswick (Limerick)	0	1	3	2	0	0	0	2	0	0	2	3	13

Sheet C	1	2	3	4	5	6	7	8	9	10	11	12	Final
Prince Edward Island (McLaine)	2	0	1	2	0	2	1	0	0	0	0	0	8
Alberta (Palmer)	0	2	0	0	1	0	0	2	1	2	1	1	10

Sheet D	1	2	3	4	5	6	7	8	9	10	11	12	Final
Saskatchewan (Dunbar)	0	2	0	3	0	0	1	0	0	1	0	0	7
British Columbia (David)	4	0	0	0	0	2	0	3	2	0	0	1	12

Sheet E	1	2	3	4	5	6	7	8	9	10	11	12	Final
Manitoba (Kennedy)	0	1	0	1	1	1	0	1	0	0	0	0	5
Ontario (Hall)	1	0	1	0	0	0	1	0	2	1	1	1	8

=== Draw 7 ===
Sheet A	1	2	3	4	5	6	7	8	9	10	11	12	Final
Alberta (Palmer)	0	0	1	0	2	2	1	1	2	2	0	1	12
New Brunswick (Limerick)	1	1	0	1	0	0	0	0	0	0	2	0	5

Sheet B	1	2	3	4	5	6	7	8	9	10	11	12	Final
Prince Edward Island (McLaine)	0	0	2	0	0	1	1	0	1	0	3	0	8
Nova Scotia (Durrant)	2	1	0	4	1	0	0	4	0	3	0	1	16

Sheet C	1	2	3	4	5	6	7	8	9	10	11	12	Final
Saskatchewan (Dunbar)	5	1	0	1	3	0	2	0	0	0	1	1	14
Quebec (Cream)	0	0	1	0	0	3	0	2	2	1	0	0	9

Sheet D	1	2	3	4	5	6	7	8	9	10	11	12	Final
British Columbia (David)	0	0	1	0	0	3	0	0	3	0	1	0	8
Ontario (Hall)	1	1	0	1	5	0	1	1	0	2	0	1	13

Sheet E	1	2	3	4	5	6	7	8	9	10	11	12	Final
Manitoba (Kennedy)	0	4	2	0	2	1	1	0	0	0	1	0	11
Northern Ontario (Millar)	3	0	0	1	0	0	0	2	1	2	0	1	10

=== Draw 8 ===
Sheet A	1	2	3	4	5	6	7	8	9	10	11	12	Final
Prince Edward Island (McLaine)	1	1	0	1	0	1	0	1	0	4	0	0	9
New Brunswick (Limerick)	0	0	1	0	1	0	3	0	3	0	1	1	10

Sheet B	1	2	3	4	5	6	7	8	9	10	11	12	Final
Northern Ontario (Millar)	1	0	2	0	1	0	2	0	1	2	0	0	9
Saskatchewan (Dunbar)	0	2	0	2	0	2	0	0	0	0	1	1	8

Sheet C	1	2	3	4	5	6	7	8	9	10	11	12	Final
Quebec (Cream)	1	1	0	4	0	2	0	0	0	2	1	0	11
Nova Scotia (Durrant)	0	0	2	0	3	0	2	2	2	0	0	1	12

Sheet D	1	2	3	4	5	6	7	8	9	10	11	12	Final
British Columbia (David)	1	0	1	2	0	1	0	1	0	1	0	0	7
Manitoba (Kennedy)	0	2	0	0	2	0	4	0	1	0	4	1	14

Sheet E	1	2	3	4	5	6	7	8	9	10	11	12	Final
Alberta (Palmer)	1	1	0	3	0	1	0	1	0	0	1	0	8
Ontario (Hall)	0	0	1	0	4	0	3	0	2	2	0	1	13

=== Draw 9 ===
Sheet A	1	2	3	4	5	6	7	8	9	10	11	12	Final
Quebec (Cream)	0	1	0	0	1	0	0	0	3	1	0	0	6
Prince Edward Island (McLaine)	1	0	1	1	0	4	1	1	0	0	1	1	11

Sheet B	1	2	3	4	5	6	7	8	9	10	11	12	Final
Saskatchewan (Dunbar)	1	0	2	0	2	0	0	1	1	0	2	1	10
Manitoba (Kennedy)	0	3	0	1	0	5	1	0	0	2	0	0	12

Sheet C	1	2	3	4	5	6	7	8	9	10	11	12	Final
British Columbia (David)	1	1	0	2	0	1	2	3	0	2	0	0	12
New Brunswick (Limerick)	0	0	2	0	3	0	0	0	1	0	1	1	8

Sheet D	1	2	3	4	5	6	7	8	9	10	11	12	Final
Ontario (Hall)	0	0	0	1	0	1	0	1	0	2	0	0	5
Northern Ontario (Millar)	1	1	1	0	1	0	3	0	2	0	1	3	13

Sheet E	1	2	3	4	5	6	7	8	9	10	11	12	Final
Alberta (Palmer)	1	4	0	2	0	4	0	0	1	0	0	1	13
Nova Scotia (Durrant)	0	0	1	0	4	0	1	1	0	1	1	0	9

== Tiebreaker ==
Sheet A	1	2	3	4	5	6	7	8	9	10	11	12	Final
Ontario (Hall)	0	2	2	3	0	2	0	1	0	0	2	0	12
Manitoba (Kennedy)	2	0	0	0	1	0	2	0	3	1	0	1	10
