= 1940 Macdonald Brier =

Canadian men's curling championship

- Host city: Winnipeg, Manitoba
- Arena: Winnipeg Amphitheatre
- Dates: March 4–7
- Winner: Manitoba
- Curling club: Granite CC, Winnipeg
- Skip: Howard Wood Sr.
- Third: Ernest Pollard
- Second: Howard Wood Jr.
- Lead: Roy Enman

The 1940 Macdonald Brier, the Canadian men's national curling championship, was held from March 4 to 7, 1940 at the Winnipeg Amphitheatre in Winnipeg, Manitoba. This was the first Brier to be held outside The Granite Club in Toronto, as the Brier became more of a national event as it travelled around the country. Winnipeg was chosen to host the event after an invitation from the Manitoba Curling Association, and due to Manitoba's dominance at the Brier up to that point.

Team Manitoba, skipped by Howard "Pappy" Wood, captured the Brier Tankard in their hometown by finishing undefeated in round robin play with a 9-0 record. Wood had only assembled the team prior to deadline for entries for that year's MCA Bonspiel, which they ended up winning.

The final draw attracted 5,000 fans, the largest attendance for a curling match up to that point.

This was Manitoba's ninth Brier championship overall and the second time that Wood's rink won the Brier with their first coming in 1930 in a tiebreaker. This was also the fourth time that a Brier champion finished unbeaten.

In addition to being the first Brier outside Toronto, the Winnipeg Brier was the first to ban curlers from bringing their own stones to compete with. Stones also had coloured tops for the first time, to aid spectators in the arena to determine which team's rocks were which. Also for the first time in Brier history, every team at the Brier had qualified via a provincial championship. At the time, every provincial championship except for New Brunswick was sponsored by Macdonald Tobacco's British Consols product. The New Brunswick championship was sponsored by Ganong Bros.

== Teams ==
The teams are listed as follows:

Alberta	British Columbia	Manitoba	New Brunswick	Northern Ontario
Royal CC, Edmonton Skip: Cliff Manahan; Third: Wesley Robinson; Second: Ross Manahan; Lead: Robert Manahan	Vancouver CC, Vancouver Skip: William Finlay; Third: Frederick Tinling; Second: Norman Williams; Lead: William LeSage	Granite CC, Winnipeg Skip: Howard Wood Sr. Third: Ernest Pollard; Second: Howard Wood Jr. Lead: Roy Enman	Bathurst CC, Bathurst Skip: Nicholas Thibodeau; Third: Harper Kent; Second: Allen Doucet; Lead: Leo Thibodeau	Kirkland Lake CC, Kirkland Lake Skip: James Davis; Third: Albert Sackrider; Second: Harry McNabb; Lead: James MacDonald
Nova Scotia	Ontario	Prince Edward Island	Quebec	Saskatchewan
Bridgewater CC, Bridgewater Skip: Stanley Rafuse; Third: Irving Hebb; Second: Warner Bickle; Lead: Frank Cook	Kitchener Granite CC, Kitchener Skip: Bert Hall; Third: Perry Hall; Second: Ernie Parkes; Lead: Campbell Seagram	Charlottetown CC, Charlottetown Skip: Rankine McLaine; Third: Gordon Hughes; Second: Reginald Bell; Lead: John Fraser	Victoria CC, Quebec City Skip: Archibald Bell; Third: James Elliott; Second: Hugh Weyman; Lead: George Warner	Kinley CC, Kinley Skip: William Dunbar; Third: James McMahon; Second: James Beckett; Lead: Ronald Eaton

== Round-robin standings ==
Key
Brier champion

Province	Skip	W	L	PF	PA
Manitoba	Howard Wood Sr.	9	0	119	63
Saskatchewan	William Dunbar	8	1	108	59
New Brunswick	Nicholas Thibodeau	6	3	103	91
Alberta	Cliff Manahan	6	3	105	77
Ontario	Bert Hall	4	5	82	93
British Columbia	William Finlay	4	5	96	78
Northern Ontario	James Davis	4	5	88	91
Quebec	Archibald Bell	2	7	79	124
Prince Edward Island	Rankine McLaine	1	8	67	116
Nova Scotia	Stanley Rafuse	1	8	63	119

== Round-robin results ==
=== Draw 1 ===
Sheet A	1	2	3	4	5	6	7	8	9	10	11	12	Final
Alberta (Manahan)	4	0	3	0	1	0	1	0	0	2	0	0	11
New Brunswick (Thibodeau)	0	2	0	4	0	2	0	2	1	0	1	1	13

Sheet B	1	2	3	4	5	6	7	8	9	10	11	12	Final
Manitoba (Wood)	1	1	0	0	2	0	1	0	2	0	0	1	8
Saskatchewan (Dunbar)	0	0	1	0	0	2	0	1	0	0	2	0	6

Sheet C	1	2	3	4	5	6	7	8	9	10	11	12	Final
British Columbia (Finlay)	0	4	2	0	1	0	0	0	0	3	1	0	11
Ontario (Hall)	0	0	0	3	0	3	2	1	1	0	0	2	12

Sheet D	1	2	3	4	5	6	7	8	9	10	11	12	Final
Quebec (Bell)	0	1	0	1	0	0	2	0	1	2	0	0	7
Nova Scotia (Rafuse)	2	0	1	0	3	2	0	1	0	0	1	1	11

Sheet E	1	2	3	4	5	6	7	8	9	10	11	12	Final
Northern Ontario (Davis)	0	1	2	0	1	2	0	1	0	1	1	2	11
Prince Edward Island (McLaine)	2	0	0	1	0	0	1	0	3	0	0	0	7

=== Draw 2 ===
Sheet A	1	2	3	4	5	6	7	8	9	10	11	12	Final
Ontario (Hall)	0	2	0	1	0	2	0	0	1	1	0	0	7
Alberta (Manahan)	2	0	2	0	1	0	2	1	0	0	3	1	12

Sheet B	1	2	3	4	5	6	7	8	9	10	11	12	Final
Nova Scotia (Rafuse)	2	0	0	0	0	0	1	1	0	0	0	0	4
British Columbia (Finlay)	0	3	1	1	1	2	0	0	2	4	1	1	16

Sheet C	1	2	3	4	5	6	7	8	9	10	11	12	Final
Saskatchewan (Dunbar)	0	0	3	2	0	2	0	4	0	2	2	1	16
Quebec (Bell)	2	1	0	0	1	0	2	0	1	0	0	0	7

Sheet D	1	2	3	4	5	6	7	8	9	10	11	12	Final
Prince Edward Island (McLaine)	0	0	1	0	0	1	0	1	0	1	0	0	4
Manitoba (Wood)	0	2	0	3	3	0	4	0	3	0	1	3	19

Sheet E	1	2	3	4	5	6	7	8	9	10	11	12	Final
Northern Ontario (Davis)	0	4	0	3	1	1	1	0	1	2	0	0	13
New Brunswick (Thibodeau)	2	0	1	0	0	0	0	2	0	0	1	1	7

=== Draw 3 ===
Sheet A	1	2	3	4	5	6	7	8	9	10	11	12	Final
Quebec (Bell)	0	3	0	0	0	1	2	0	1	0	4	1	12
Prince Edward Island (McLaine)	3	0	1	1	2	0	0	3	0	1	0	0	11

Sheet B	1	2	3	4	5	6	7	8	9	10	11	12	Final
New Brunswick (Thibodeau)	0	2	1	0	0	2	0	3	1	0	1	0	10
Manitoba (Wood)	2	0	0	1	2	0	2	0	0	2	0	4	13

Sheet C	1	2	3	4	5	6	7	8	9	10	11	12	Final
Nova Scotia (Rafuse)	0	0	1	0	0	1	1	0	0	0	1	2	6
Alberta (Manahan)	3	1	0	1	2	0	0	3	3	2	0	0	15

Sheet D	1	2	3	4	5	6	7	8	9	10	11	12	Final
Northern Ontario (Davis)	0	1	1	0	1	0	1	1	0	2	0	2	9
Ontario (Hall)	1	0	0	1	0	3	0	0	2	0	4	0	11

Sheet E	1	2	3	4	5	6	7	8	9	10	11	12	Final
British Columbia (Finlay) 🔨	0	0	1	0	1	0	0	0	1	0	2	0	5
Saskatchewan (Dunbar)	0	1	0	0	0	4	2	2	0	2	0	3	14

=== Draw 4 ===
Sheet A	1	2	3	4	5	6	7	8	9	10	11	12	Final
Manitoba (Wood)	3	0	4	1	0	0	0	4	2	1	1	1	17
Nova Scotia (Rafuse)	0	1	0	0	1	1	1	0	0	0	0	0	4

Sheet B	1	2	3	4	5	6	7	8	9	10	11	12	Final
Alberta (Manahan)	0	0	0	0	1	2	3	0	0	1	1	2	10
Prince Edward Island (McLaine)	1	1	1	1	0	0	0	1	1	0	0	0	6

Sheet C	1	2	3	4	5	6	7	8	9	10	11	12	Final
Saskatchewan (Dunbar)	0	1	1	0	1	1	1	0	1	0	2	0	8
Northern Ontario (Davis)	1	0	0	1	0	0	0	1	0	1	0	2	6

Sheet D	1	2	3	4	5	6	7	8	9	10	11	12	Final
New Brunswick (Thibodeau)	1	0	4	0	1	0	0	0	1	1	0	2	10
British Columbia (Finlay)	0	1	0	2	0	3	1	1	0	0	1	0	9

Sheet E	1	2	3	4	5	6	7	8	9	10	11	12	Final
Quebec (Bell)	2	0	3	0	3	0	5	0	0	1	0	1	15
Ontario (Hall)	0	2	0	1	0	1	0	3	1	0	1	0	9

=== Draw 5 ===
Sheet A	1	2	3	4	5	6	7	8	9	10	11	12	Final
Saskatchewan (Dunbar)	1	2	0	3	0	0	1	0	1	0	1	1	10
Alberta (Manahan)	0	0	1	0	1	1	0	1	0	2	0	0	6

Sheet B	1	2	3	4	5	6	7	8	9	10	11	12	Final
Manitoba (Wood)	2	1	0	0	1	1	1	0	3	2	0	0	11
British Columbia (Finlay)	0	0	2	1	0	0	0	3	0	0	1	0	7

Sheet C	1	2	3	4	5	6	7	8	9	10	11	12	Final
Prince Edward Island (McLaine)	2	1	0	0	0	1	0	1	0	4	0	0	9
Ontario (Hall)	0	0	2	1	2	0	1	0	2	0	4	1	13

Sheet D	1	2	3	4	5	6	7	8	9	10	11	12	Final
New Brunswick (Thibodeau)	1	2	1	2	3	0	2	2	0	1	0	0	14
Nova Scotia (Rafuse)	0	0	0	0	0	4	0	0	1	0	3	2	10

Sheet E	1	2	3	4	5	6	7	8	9	10	11	12	Final
Quebec (Bell)	2	0	2	0	0	0	2	0	2	0	0	0	8
Northern Ontario (Davis)	0	1	0	1	3	1	0	6	0	1	2	1	16

=== Draw 6 ===
Sheet A	1	2	3	4	5	6	7	8	9	10	11	12	Final
Alberta (Manahan)	1	0	1	0	0	1	0	1	1	0	2	0	7
British Columbia (Finlay)	0	1	0	0	1	0	1	0	0	1	0	2	6

Sheet B	1	2	3	4	5	6	7	8	9	10	11	12	Final
Manitoba (Wood)	3	1	2	2	2	0	0	0	2	0	0	1	13
Quebec (Bell)	0	0	0	0	0	1	2	1	0	1	2	0	7

Sheet C	1	2	3	4	5	6	7	8	9	10	11	12	Final
Northern Ontario (Davis)	1	0	1	1	1	0	0	1	3	2	2	0	12
Nova Scotia (Rafuse)	0	2	0	0	0	2	1	0	0	0	0	1	6

Sheet D	1	2	3	4	5	6	7	8	9	10	11	12	Final
Ontario (Hall)	2	0	0	0	0	0	1	0	1	0	0	1	5
New Brunswick (Thibodeau)	0	3	1	0	1	1	0	2	0	2	2	0	12

Sheet E	1	2	3	4	5	6	7	8	9	10	11	12	Final
Saskatchewan (Dunbar)	1	0	3	2	2	0	0	2	3	2	0	2	17
Prince Edward Island (McLaine)	0	1	0	0	0	0	3	0	0	0	0	0	4

=== Draw 7 ===
Sheet A	1	2	3	4	5	6	7	8	9	10	11	12	Final
Alberta (Manahan)	3	2	0	0	4	4	2	0	3	0	1	0	19
Northern Ontario (Davis)	0	0	0	2	0	0	0	1	0	1	0	1	5

Sheet B	1	2	3	4	5	6	7	8	9	10	11	12	Final
Ontario (Hall)	0	0	2	0	0	1	0	1	0	1	0	1	6
Manitoba (Wood)	0	1	0	2	1	0	1	0	2	0	1	0	8

Sheet C	1	2	3	4	5	6	7	8	9	10	11	12	Final
Nova Scotia (Rafuse)	0	0	0	0	1	0	0	2	0	2	0	1	6
Saskatchewan (Dunbar)	2	1	2	1	0	2	2	0	3	0	3	0	16

Sheet D	1	2	3	4	5	6	7	8	9	10	11	12	Final
Prince Edward Island (McLaine)	0	0	3	1	0	0	2	0	0	1	0	1	8
New Brunswick (Thibodeau)	3	0	0	0	4	0	0	3	1	0	2	0	13

Sheet E	1	2	3	4	5	6	7	8	9	10	11	12	Final
British Columbia (Finlay)	4	0	1	2	0	1	1	0	4	3	3	0	19
Quebec (Bell)	0	1	0	0	1	0	0	2	0	0	0	1	5

=== Draw 8 ===
Sheet A	1	2	3	4	5	6	7	8	9	10	11	12	Final
Alberta (Manahan)	0	1	2	2	0	0	4	1	2	0	0	2	14
Quebec (Bell)	1	0	0	0	2	1	0	0	0	2	1	0	7

Sheet B	1	2	3	4	5	6	7	8	9	10	11	12	Final
Northern Ontario (Davis)	0	2	0	2	0	2	0	1	0	0	1	0	8
Manitoba (Wood)	3	0	2	0	1	0	2	0	2	2	0	1	13

Sheet C	1	2	3	4	5	6	7	8	9	10	11	12	13	Final
New Brunswick (Thibodeau)	1	1	0	4	0	0	1	0	1	0	1	0	0	9
Saskatchewan (Dunbar)	0	0	1	0	0	1	0	3	0	3	0	1	2	11

Sheet D	1	2	3	4	5	6	7	8	9	10	11	12	Final
British Columbia (Finlay)	3	2	1	0	2	0	3	0	0	1	0	0	12
Prince Edward Island (McLaine)	0	0	0	2	0	2	0	1	0	0	1	1	7

Sheet E	1	2	3	4	5	6	7	8	9	10	11	12	Final
Nova Scotia (Rafuse)	0	0	0	2	0	0	1	0	1	1	2	0	7
Ontario (Hall)	1	1	0	0	5	2	0	1	0	0	0	1	11

=== Draw 9 ===
Sheet A	1	2	3	4	5	6	7	8	9	10	11	12	Final
Manitoba (Wood)	1	0	3	0	2	0	4	0	2	5	0	0	17
Alberta (Manahan)	0	1	0	2	0	3	0	2	0	0	1	2	11

Sheet B	1	2	3	4	5	6	7	8	9	10	11	12	Final
Ontario (Hall)	1	0	1	2	0	0	0	1	0	2	0	1	8
Saskatchewan (Dunbar)	0	1	0	0	0	2	0	0	3	0	4	0	10

Sheet C	1	2	3	4	5	6	7	8	9	10	11	12	Final
British Columbia (Finlay)	1	0	0	1	0	3	2	0	1	1	2	0	11
Northern Ontario (Davis)	0	1	1	0	1	0	0	3	0	0	0	2	8

Sheet D	1	2	3	4	5	6	7	8	9	10	11	12	Final
Prince Edward Island (McLaine)	0	2	1	1	0	2	0	2	0	1	1	1	11
Nova Scotia (Rafuse)	2	0	0	0	1	0	1	0	5	0	0	0	9

Sheet E	1	2	3	4	5	6	7	8	9	10	11	12	Final
New Brunswick (Thibodeau)	3	0	3	0	3	0	1	0	3	0	2	0	15
Quebec (Bell)	0	1	0	3	0	1	0	1	0	2	0	3	11
