= KW Granite Club =

Curling club in Waterloo, Ontario

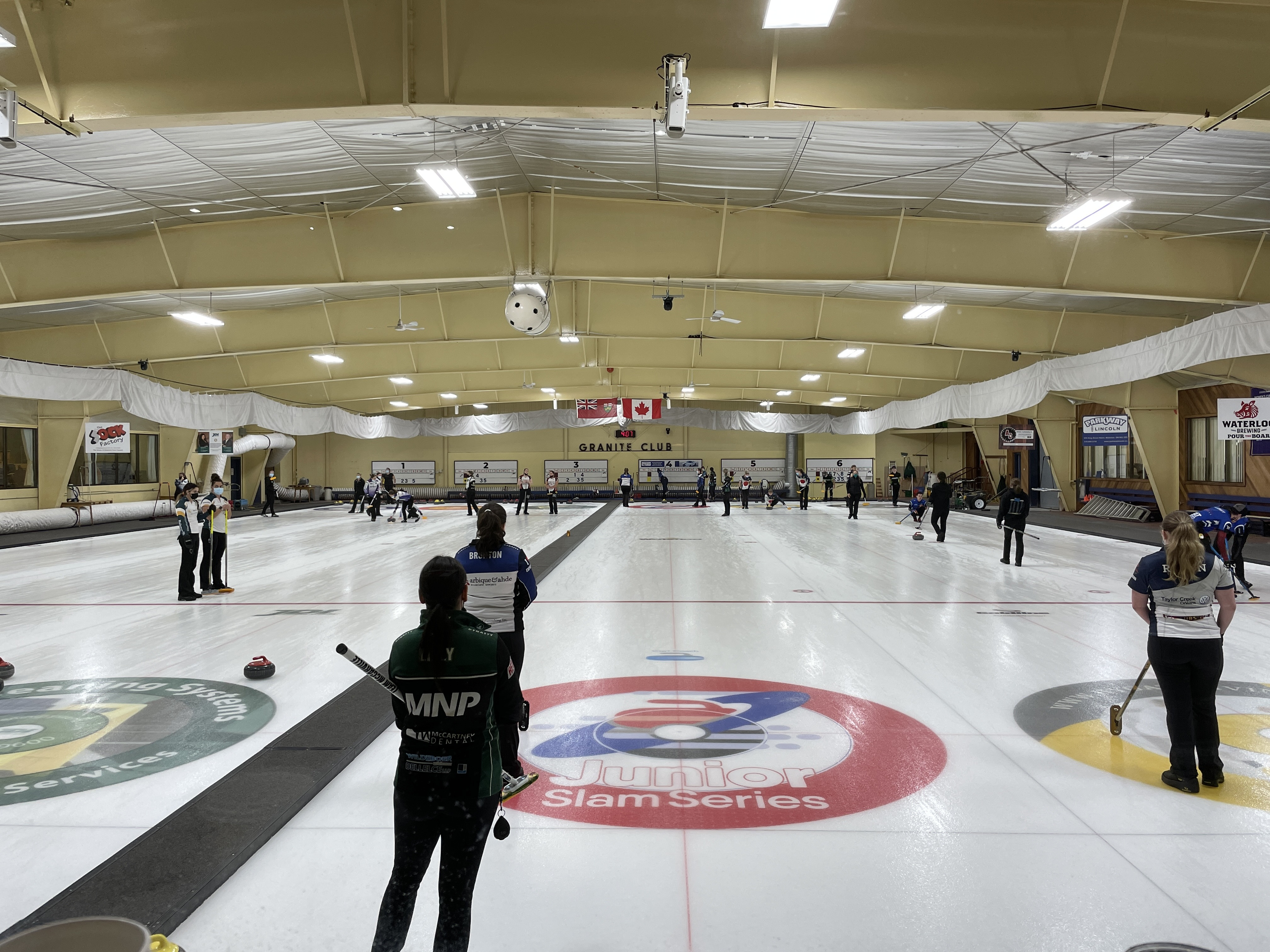
- Location: 99 Seagram Dr; Waterloo, Ontario, Canada

Information
- Established: 1927
- Club type: Dedicated Ice
- Curling Canada region: CurlON Zone 12
- Sheets of ice: Six
- Rock colours: Red and Yellow
- Website: kwgranite.com

The Kitchener-Waterloo Granite Curling Club (branded as the KW Granite Club) is a curling club on Seagram Drive in Waterloo, Ontario.

== History ==
The club was formed in 1927 as the Granite Club by the Athletic Association of Kitchener and Waterloo (AAKW), which was briefly called the Kitchener Curling Club. The club played on a five-sheet rink at 69 Agnes Street in Kitchener. The AAKW had been formed by members of the clubs located at the corners of Erb and Regina streets in Waterloo and Gaukel Street in Kitchener (previously Berlin). Curling had been played at those clubs since the 1880s. The club adopted the name "Granite Club" to appeal to more than just curling. Artificial ice was added in 1928.

In 1928, the Kitchener Tennis Club built five courts next to the club, and in 1931 the K-W Badminton Club added an addition. From 1941 to 1948 the K-W Skating Club also called the Granite home, until moving to the Waterloo Memorial Arena. Also in 1948, a Ladies section was added to the club.

On May 8, 1955 a fire caused by careless children destroyed half the building, gutting the badminton club and some of the curling facilities. Damages totalled at $200,000. The club rebuilt and remained on Agnes Street until moving to its present location Waterloo in 2003. The badminton club remained on Agnes Street. The current Waterloo Park site of the Granite Club previously housed the K-W Skating Club before it relocated to RIM Park. Called the "Rink in the Park", the Granite Club officially opened the building to the public on September 30, 2003, in time for the annual curling season.

The club has hosted the 1980 World Junior Curling Championships, the 1969 and 1975 Canadian Mixed Curling Championship and the 2004 M&M Meat Shops Skins Game. The club also held the round-robin portion of the inaugural 2025 GSOC Wheelchair Curling Invitational, a Grand Slam of Curling event. The club also hosts the annual KW Fall Classic World Curling Tour event.

== Provincial champions ==
Year	Event	Skip	Third	Second	Lead	Record at Nationals
1930	Toronto Bonspiel	R. G. Hall	L. L. Cooke	Perry G. Hall	J. B. English	5-4 (3rd)
1937	British Consols	Albert Dunker	Irwin Huntington	Arthur Lehnen	Fred Hasenflug	2-7 (T7th)
1938	British Consols	Bert Hall	Percy Hall	Ernie Parkes	Campbell Seagram	4-5 (T5th)
1939	British Consols	Bert Hall	Percy Hall	Ernie Parkes	Campbell Seagram	9-1 (1st)
1940	British Consols	Bert Hall	Percy Hall	Ernie Parkes	Campbell Seagram	4-5 (T5th)
1941	British Consols	Percy Hall	Jack Lucas	Arthur Lehnen	William Henderson Jr.	7-2 (2nd)
1944	British Consols	Percy Hall	Bert Hall	Arthur Lehnen	William Henderson Jr.	Cancelled due to World War II
1944	Men's Colts	Carl Asmussen				
1945	British Consols	Percy Hall	Bert Hall	Arthur Lehnen	William Henderson Jr.	Cancelled due to World War II
1946	British Consols	Percy Hall	Bert Hall	Arthur Lehnen	William Henderson Jr.	5-4 (T5th)
1948	Men's Colts					
1950	British Consols	Carl Asmussen	Larry Shantz	Cully Schmidt	Ed Schultz	5-4 (T4th)
1957	Women's	Edna Teskey	Jean Beardsley	Veryl Finlay	Anne Trussler	N/A
1963	Women's Trophy	Mary Gray	Jean Price	Arlene Steep	Myrtle Shuh	N/A
1967	Men's Senior Championship	Carl Asmussen	Hal Frye	Bill Clarke	Doug Smith	?
1982	Women's Trophy	Sue Laurin	Laura Davis-Cook	Gladys O'Hara	Lynda Collins	N/A
1986	Women's Trophy	Laura Davis-Cook	Gladys O'Hara	Lynda MacRae	Janet Wall	N/A
1997	Men's Senior Championship	Bob Turcotte	Roy Weigand	Bob Lichti	Steve McDermot	12-0 (1st)
2000	Men's Colts	Ron Mooibroek	David Lynn	Dean Palmer	Travis Gambe	N/A
2001	Men's Colts	Ean MacDonald	Steve Southern	Gerry Lamont	Rob Graham	N/A
2004	Women's Masters	Wendy Simpson	Ilse Hoffman	Lorna Allen	Glad O'Hara	?
2007	Women's Juniors	Hollie Nicol	Laura Hickey	Karen Sagle	Hilary McDermott	7-5 (T5th)
2009	Men's Juniors	Bowie Abbis-Mills	Scott McGregor	Scott Hindle	Terry Arnold	5-5 (T6th)
2009	Junior Mixed	Mark Kean	Jaclyn Rivington	Andrew Inouye	Darrelle Johnson	N/A
2010	4 Person Stick	Ed Ferguson	Bryan Hawkins	Ian Anderson	David Cain	N/A
2011	Women's Juniors	Clancy Grandy	Sarah Wilkes	Laura Crocker	Lynn Kreviazuk	5-7 (9th)
2013	Men's Colts	Richard Krell	Shane Konings	Spencer Nuttall	John Gabel	N/A
2013	Men's Curling Club Championships	Brent Gray	Brian Gray	Anthony Silvestro	Richard Krell	3-3 (T6th)
2014	Women's Juniors	Molly Greenwood	Amy Heitzner	Carly Van Daele	Emma Malfara	7-3 (4th)
2014	Men's Senior Championship	Peter Mellor	Jeff Thomson	Rob Saunders	Steve Foster	5-6 (T5th)
2017	Mixed Doubles	Nicole Westlund Stewart	Tyler Stewart			1-6 (T26th)
2018	U21 Mixed Doubles	Matthew Hall	Riley Sandham			N/A
2019	Men's Curling Club Championship	Paul Moffatt	Ben Shane	John Gabel	Kyle Forster	9-1 (1st)
2025	Mixed	Sam Mooibroek	Emma Artichuk	Wyatt Small	Jamie Smith	TBD
2025	Mixed Doubles	Katie Ford	Oliver Campbell			6–2 (6th)
