= 2025 GSOC Wheelchair Curling Invitational =

2025 GSOC Wheelchair Invitational
- Host city: Waterloo & London, Ontario
- Arena: KW Granite Club; Western Fair Sports Centre
- Dates: September 24–28
- Winner: Canada Red
- Skip: Mark Ideson
- Third: Jon Thurston
- Second: Ina Forrest
- Lead: Collinda Joseph
- Alternate: Gilbert Dash
- Finalist: (United Kingdom) Great Britain (Nibloe)

The 2025 GSOC Wheelchair Invitational was held from September 24 to 28 at the KW Granite Club in Waterloo, Ontario in a double round robin tournament. After the round robin, the gold-medal (1v2) and bronze-medal (3v4) games was held at the Western Fair Sports Centre in London, Ontario, alongside the men's and women's Grand Slam of Curling’s (GSOC) AMJ Masters finals. The inaugural event was organized by the Grand Slam of Curling to promote and provide greater visibility to wheelchair curling, especially with the upcoming 2026 Winter Paralympics.

== Teams ==
The teams are listed as follows:

Canada Red	Canada White	(United Kingdom) Great Britain	Italy
Skip: Mark Ideson; Third: Jon Thurston; Second: Ina Forrest; Lead: Collinda Joseph; Alternate: Gilbert Dash	Skip: Marie Wright; Third: Chrissy Molnar; Second: Dennis Thiessen; Lead: Jill Hopkins; Alternate: Karl Allen	Skip: Hugh Nibloe; Third: Jason Kean; Second: Gary Smith; Lead: Karen Aspey; Alternate: Jo Butterfield	Skip: Egidio Marchese; Third: Fabrizio Bich; Second: Matteo Ronzani; Lead: Giuliana Turra; Alternate: Angela Menardi

== Round robin standings ==
Final Round Robin Standings

Key
Teams to Gold Medal Game
Teams to Bronze Medal Game

Team	W	L	PF	PA
Canada Red	5	1	40	28
(United Kingdom) Great Britain	4	2	40	31
Italy	2	4	30	35
Canada White	1	5	24	40

== Round robin results ==
All draw times are listed in Eastern Time (UTC−04:00).

=== Draw 1 ===
Wednesday, September 24, 9:30 am

Sheet 1	1	2	3	4	5	6	7	8	Final
Canada Red	1	0	2	0	0	1	0	4	8
(United Kingdom) Great Britain	0	2	0	3	1	0	1	0	7

Sheet 2	1	2	3	4	5	6	7	8	Final
Italy	0	0	0	1	0	0	3	0	4
Canada White	0	1	2	0	0	2	0	1	6

=== Draw 2 ===
Wednesday, September 24, 11:30 am

Sheet 1	1	2	3	4	5	6	7	8	Final
(United Kingdom) Great Britain	0	3	0	1	0	3	2	X	9
Canada White	1	0	2	0	3	0	0	X	6

Sheet 2	1	2	3	4	5	6	7	8	9	Final
Canada Red	0	0	0	1	0	0	4	1	1	7
Italy	1	1	1	0	2	1	0	0	0	6

=== Draw 3 ===
Thursday, September 25, 12:00 pm

Sheet 1	1	2	3	4	5	6	7	8	Final
Canada White	1	0	0	0	1	0	0	X	2
Canada Red	0	1	2	1	0	1	2	X	7

Sheet 2	1	2	3	4	5	6	7	8	Final
Italy	2	2	1	3	0	0	2	X	10
(United Kingdom) Great Britain	0	0	0	0	1	3	0	X	4

=== Draw 4 ===
Friday, September 26, 12:00 pm

Sheet 1	1	2	3	4	5	6	7	8	Final
Canada White	0	2	0	0	0	0	1	X	3
Italy	1	0	2	1	1	2	0	X	7

Sheet 2	1	2	3	4	5	6	7	8	Final
(United Kingdom) Great Britain	0	2	1	1	2	0	1	X	7
Canada Red	2	0	0	0	0	1	0	X	3

=== Draw 5 ===
Friday, September 26, 5:00 pm

Sheet 1	1	2	3	4	5	6	7	8	Final
Italy	0	1	0	0	1	0	X	X	2
Canada Red	3	0	3	2	0	1	X	X	9

Sheet 2	1	2	3	4	5	6	7	8	Final
Canada White	1	0	0	0	1	0	1	X	3
(United Kingdom) Great Britain	0	1	3	2	0	1	0	X	7

=== Draw 6 ===
Saturday, September 27, 10:30 am

Sheet 1	1	2	3	4	5	6	7	8	Final
(United Kingdom) Great Britain	0	1	0	1	1	1	2	X	6
Italy	1	0	0	0	0	0	0	X	1

Sheet 2	1	2	3	4	5	6	7	8	Final
Canada Red	2	0	0	1	2	1	0	X	6
Canada White	0	0	1	0	0	0	3	X	4

== Playoffs ==
Gold medal game
1	Canada Red	7
2	(United Kingdom) Great Britain	2
Bronze medal game
3	Italy	4
4	Canada White	5

=== Bronze Medal Game ===
Sunday, September 22, 10:30 am

Sheet A	1	2	3	4	5	6	7	8	Final
Italy	0	1	0	1	0	0	0	2	4
Canada White	1	0	1	0	0	1	2	0	5

=== Gold Medal Game ===
Sunday, September 22, 3:00 pm

Sheet A	1	2	3	4	5	6	7	8	Final
Canada Red	1	1	1	1	1	2	0	X	7
(United Kingdom) Great Britain	0	0	0	0	0	0	2	X	2
