= 1938 Macdonald Brier =

Canadian men's curling championship

- Host city: Toronto, Ontario
- Arena: Granite Curling Club
- Dates: February 28–March 3
- Winner: Manitoba
- Curling club: Glenboro CC, Glenboro
- Skip: Ab Gowanlock
- Third: Elwyn Cartmell
- Second: William McKnight
- Lead: Edward McKnight

The 1938 Macdonald Brier, the Canadian men's national curling championship, was held from February 28 to March 3, 1938 at the Granite Club in Toronto, Ontario.

Team Manitoba, skipped by Ab Gowanlock, finished round robin play unbeaten with a 9-0 record, becoming only the third team to win the Brier with an undefeated record. This was also Manitoba's eighth Brier championship overall. The defending Brier champions, the Cliff Manahan rink of Alberta, finished runner-up with an 8-1 record as their only loss came to Manitoba.

== Teams ==
The teams are listed as follows:

Alberta	British Columbia	Manitoba	New Brunswick	Northern Ontario
Royal CC, Edmonton Skip: Cliff Manahan; Third: Wesley Robinson; Second: Ross Manahan; Lead: Lloyd McIntyre	Vancouver CC, Vancouver Skip: William Finlay; Third: Frederick Tinling; Second: Lionel Tinling; Lead: William LeSage	Glenboro CC, Glenboro Skip: Ab Gowanlock; Third: Elwyn Cartmell; Second: William McKnight; Lead: Edward McKnight	Bathurst CC, Bathurst Skip: Daniel Connolly; Third: Joseph Connolly; Second: John Kennah; Lead: Aurele Landry	Timmins CC, Timmins Skip: John Walker; Third: Samuel Caldbick; Second: Robert Donald; Lead: John Gauthier
Nova Scotia	Ontario	Prince Edward Island	Quebec	Saskatchewan
Mayflower CC, Halifax Skip: Charles Durrant; Third: Henry McLeod; Second: Frank Arthur; Lead: Edward Simm	Kitchener Granite CC, Kitchener Skip: Bert Hall; Third: Perry Hall; Second: Ernie Parkes; Lead: Campbell Seagram	Charlottetown CC, Charlottetown Skip: Rankine McLaine; Third: Gordon Hughes; Second: John Fraser; Lead: Charles Williams	Quebec CC, Quebec City Skip: Robert Cream; Third: Sidney Annett; Second: Edward Ployart; Lead: Percy Woods	Prince Albert CC, Prince Albert Skip: Manfield Humphries; Third: John Brower; Second: George Dunbar; Lead: Sudbury Reed

== Round Robin standings ==
Key
Brier champion

Province	Skip	W	L	PF	PA
Manitoba	Ab Gowanlock	9	0	116	62
Alberta	Cliff Manahan	8	1	105	73
British Columbia	William Finlay	6	3	97	75
New Brunswick	Daniel Connolly	5	4	104	89
Ontario	Bert Hall	4	5	99	92
Nova Scotia	Charles Durrant	4	5	93	103
Saskatchewan	Manfield Humphries	4	5	102	97
Northern Ontario	John Walker	3	6	81	107
Quebec	Robert Cream	2	7	72	112
Prince Edward Island	Rankine McLaine	0	9	62	121

== Round Robin results ==
=== Draw 1 ===
Sheet A	1	2	3	4	5	6	7	8	9	10	11	12	Final
Alberta (Manahan)	0	1	2	3	0	0	2	0	0	0	3	3	14
Quebec (Cream)	2	0	0	0	1	1	0	1	3	1	0	0	9

Sheet B	1	2	3	4	5	6	7	8	9	10	11	12	Final
Saskatchewan (Humphries)	1	4	0	1	3	0	3	1	0	2	0	1	16
Prince Edward Island (McLaine)	0	0	1	0	0	2	0	0	1	0	3	0	7

Sheet C	1	2	3	4	5	6	7	8	9	10	11	12	Final
Nova Scotia (Durrant)	1	1	1	0	0	2	0	1	0	0	2	0	8
Ontario (Hall)	0	0	0	1	1	0	3	0	4	1	0	4	14

Sheet D	1	2	3	4	5	6	7	8	9	10	11	12	Final
British Columbia (Finlay)	0	1	0	1	1	0	1	0	2	2	0	1	9
New Brunswick (Connolly)	4	0	1	0	0	1	0	2	0	0	0	0	8

Sheet E	1	2	3	4	5	6	7	8	9	10	11	12	Final
Manitoba (Gowanlock)	3	2	0	3	0	1	0	4	1	0	1	1	16
Northern Ontario (Walker)	0	0	4	0	1	0	3	0	0	1	0	0	9

=== Draw 2 ===
Sheet A	1	2	3	4	5	6	7	8	9	10	11	12	Final
Prince Edward Island (McLaine)	0	1	0	0	2	2	0	3	0	0	2	2	12
Ontario (Hall)	1	0	1	4	0	0	3	0	3	2	0	0	14

Sheet B	1	2	3	4	5	6	7	8	9	10	11	12	Final
Northern Ontario (Walker)	1	1	1	2	1	3	0	1	3	0	1	0	14
Quebec (Cream)	0	0	0	0	0	0	1	0	0	3	0	1	5

Sheet C	1	2	3	4	5	6	7	8	9	10	11	12	Final
British Columbia (Finlay)	0	0	3	0	0	0	3	0	2	2	1	1	12
Nova Scotia (Durrant)	1	2	0	1	1	1	0	2	0	0	0	0	8

Sheet D	1	2	3	4	5	6	7	8	9	10	11	12	Final
Saskatchewan (Humphries)	0	0	1	0	3	0	2	0	0	2	1	0	9
Manitoba (Gowanlock)	1	1	0	2	0	1	0	1	2	0	0	2	10

Sheet E	1	2	3	4	5	6	7	8	9	10	11	12	Final
Alberta (Manahan)	0	0	0	5	0	1	0	1	0	3	3	1	14
New Brunswick (Connolly)	1	2	2	0	1	0	1	0	2	0	0	0	9

=== Draw 3 ===
Sheet A	1	2	3	4	5	6	7	8	9	10	11	12	Final
Prince Edward Island (McLaine)	0	0	0	0	0	2	1	0	2	0	1	1	7
British Columbia (Finlay)	1	1	2	2	3	0	0	1	0	1	0	0	11

Sheet B	1	2	3	4	5	6	7	8	9	10	11	12	Final
Quebec (Cream)	1	2	1	0	0	3	0	1	0	0	0	1	9
Saskatchewan (Humphries)	0	0	0	1	1	0	4	0	4	5	1	0	16

Sheet C	1	2	3	4	5	6	7	8	9	10	11	12	Final
New Brunswick (Connolly)	0	0	2	0	1	0	1	0	1	0	0	3	8
Northern Ontario (Walker)	1	2	0	1	0	1	0	3	0	1	1	0	10

Sheet D	1	2	3	4	5	6	7	8	9	10	11	12	13	Final
Ontario (Hall)	0	3	0	0	0	1	0	0	0	1	1	1	0	7
Manitoba (Gowanlock)	1	0	3	0	0	0	1	1	1	0	0	0	2	9

Sheet E	1	2	3	4	5	6	7	8	9	10	11	12	Final
Alberta (Manahan)	1	0	2	2	1	1	0	2	0	2	1	0	12
Nova Scotia (Durrant)	0	2	0	0	0	0	1	0	3	0	0	2	8

=== Draw 4 ===
Sheet A	1	2	3	4	5	6	7	8	9	10	11	12	Final
Northern Ontario (Walker)	0	1	0	2	1	0	1	3	0	1	2	0	11
Prince Edward Island (McLaine)	1	0	2	0	0	2	0	0	3	0	0	1	9

Sheet B	1	2	3	4	5	6	7	8	9	10	11	12	Final
Ontario (Hall)	1	0	2	0	0	2	0	3	0	0	0	4	12
New Brunswick (Connolly)	0	4	0	4	1	0	2	0	2	1	1	0	15

Sheet C	1	2	3	4	5	6	7	8	9	10	11	12	Final
Alberta (Manahan)	1	0	1	0	1	0	2	0	1	0	1	0	7
Manitoba (Gowanlock)	0	1	0	2	0	2	0	1	0	4	0	3	13

Sheet D	1	2	3	4	5	6	7	8	9	10	11	12	Final
Nova Scotia (Durrant)	0	0	1	2	0	3	0	2	1	3	0	1	13
Saskatchewan (Humphries)	3	3	0	0	1	0	1	0	0	0	2	0	10

Sheet E	1	2	3	4	5	6	7	8	9	10	11	12	Final
Quebec (Cream)	0	0	2	0	0	1	0	0	0	0	1	1	5
British Columbia (Finlay)	1	1	0	4	4	0	3	1	2	0	0	0	16

=== Draw 5 ===
Sheet A	1	2	3	4	5	6	7	8	9	10	11	12	Final
Saskatchewan (Humphries)	1	0	1	0	3	0	1	0	1	5	1	0	13
British Columbia (Finlay)	0	2	0	3	0	3	0	1	0	0	0	1	10

Sheet B	1	2	3	4	5	6	7	8	9	10	11	12	Final
Northern Ontario (Walker)	2	1	0	0	0	0	0	0	3	2	0	2	10
Nova Scotia (Durrant)	0	0	1	2	3	2	2	1	0	0	2	0	13

Sheet C	1	2	3	4	5	6	7	8	9	10	11	12	Final
Quebec (Cream)	2	3	1	0	0	1	1	1	0	2	0	0	11
Prince Edward Island (McLaine)	0	0	0	1	1	0	0	0	1	0	3	1	7

Sheet D	1	2	3	4	5	6	7	8	9	10	11	12	Final
Manitoba (Gowanlock)	0	0	1	0	1	0	0	3	3	0	4	1	13
New Brunswick (Connolly)	1	1	0	2	0	1	1	0	0	1	0	0	7

Sheet E	1	2	3	4	5	6	7	8	9	10	11	12	Final
Ontario (Hall)	1	0	0	0	1	0	1	0	0	1	1	0	5
Alberta (Manahan)	0	1	1	1	0	2	0	1	1	0	0	1	8

=== Draw 6 ===
Sheet A	1	2	3	4	5	6	7	8	9	10	11	12	Final
Manitoba (Gowanlock)	1	0	1	1	0	2	1	3	2	2	0	1	14
Quebec (Cream)	0	1	0	0	2	0	0	0	0	0	1	0	4

Sheet B	1	2	3	4	5	6	7	8	9	10	11	12	Final
Nova Scotia (Durrant)	0	0	0	2	0	4	0	0	0	0	1	0	7
New Brunswick (Connolly)	1	1	1	0	1	0	4	2	2	1	0	1	14

Sheet C	1	2	3	4	5	6	7	8	9	10	11	12	13	Final
British Columbia (Finlay)	1	1	0	1	1	0	0	0	0	2	0	2	3	11
Ontario (Hall)	0	0	1	0	0	1	1	3	1	0	1	0	0	8

Sheet D	1	2	3	4	5	6	7	8	9	10	11	12	Final
Prince Edward Island (McLaine)	1	0	0	1	0	0	1	0	0	1	0	1	5
Alberta (Manahan)	0	3	1	0	2	1	0	1	2	0	3	0	13

Sheet E	1	2	3	4	5	6	7	8	9	10	11	12	Final
Northern Ontario (Walker)	0	0	0	3	0	0	2	0	1	0	0	0	6
Saskatchewan (Humphries)	0	2	1	0	2	1	0	1	0	2	3	1	13

=== Draw 7 ===
Sheet A	1	2	3	4	5	6	7	8	9	10	11	12	Final
British Columbia (Finlay)	1	0	2	1	0	1	0	0	1	0	1	0	7
Manitoba (Gowanlock)	0	2	0	0	2	0	1	1	0	1	0	1	8

Sheet B	1	2	3	4	5	6	7	8	9	10	11	12	Final
New Brunswick (Connolly)	0	2	1	5	0	1	0	0	1	0	1	0	11
Quebec (Cream)	1	0	0	0	1	0	1	1	0	4	0	1	9

Sheet C	1	2	3	4	5	6	7	8	9	10	11	12	Final
Saskatchewan (Humphries)	0	0	3	0	0	1	0	1	0	1	0	0	6
Ontario (Hall)	1	1	0	2	3	0	1	0	1	0	4	1	14

Sheet D	1	2	3	4	5	6	7	8	9	10	11	12	Final
Alberta (Manahan)	4	0	2	1	1	1	0	1	2	1	2	0	15
Northern Ontario (Walker)	0	1	0	0	0	0	2	0	0	0	0	1	4

Sheet E	1	2	3	4	5	6	7	8	9	10	11	12	Final
Nova Scotia (Durrant)	3	2	0	2	3	0	0	1	1	2	1	3	18
Prince Edward Island (McLaine)	0	0	1	0	0	1	1	0	0	0	0	0	3

=== Draw 8 ===
Sheet A	1	2	3	4	5	6	7	8	9	10	11	12	Final
Alberta (Manahan)	2	0	2	0	2	2	0	2	0	0	0	1	11
British Columbia (Finlay)	0	4	0	2	0	0	1	0	1	1	1	0	10

Sheet B	1	2	3	4	5	6	7	8	9	10	11	12	Final
Manitoba (Gowanlock)	1	3	0	0	1	1	0	3	1	1	0	1	12
Prince Edward Island (McLaine)	0	0	1	1	0	0	2	0	0	0	2	0	6

Sheet C	1	2	3	4	5	6	7	8	9	10	11	12	Final
Nova Scotia (Durrant)	1	1	1	1	0	0	2	0	3	2	1	0	12
Quebec (Cream)	0	0	0	0	1	1	0	2	0	0	0	3	7

Sheet D	1	2	3	4	5	6	7	8	9	10	11	12	Final
Ontario (Hall)	0	3	2	3	0	0	0	2	0	4	1	2	17
Northern Ontario (Walker)	4	0	0	0	1	1	2	0	2	0	0	0	10

Sheet E	1	2	3	4	5	6	7	8	9	10	11	12	Final
New Brunswick (Connolly)	2	3	0	4	0	1	0	5	2	0	0	0	17
Saskatchewan (Humphries)	0	0	1	0	1	0	1	0	0	2	2	2	9

=== Draw 9 ===
Sheet A	1	2	3	4	5	6	7	8	9	10	11	12	Final
Manitoba (Gowanlock)	1	0	4	5	0	1	6	0	2	0	2	0	21
Nova Scotia (Durrant)	0	1	0	0	1	0	0	1	0	1	0	2	6

Sheet B	1	2	3	4	5	6	7	8	9	10	11	12	Final
Ontario (Hall)	1	0	0	0	0	3	0	0	0	3	1	0	8
Quebec (Cream)	0	1	1	2	3	0	2	2	1	0	0	1	13

Sheet C	1	2	3	4	5	6	7	8	9	10	11	12	Final
Saskatchewan (Humphries)	1	0	1	0	1	2	1	0	2	0	2	0	10
Alberta (Manahan)	0	3	0	4	0	0	0	2	0	1	0	1	11

Sheet D	1	2	3	4	5	6	7	8	9	10	11	12	Final
New Brunswick (Connolly)	1	0	4	3	1	3	1	0	0	1	1	0	15
Prince Edward Island (McLaine)	0	2	0	0	0	0	0	1	1	0	0	2	6

Sheet E	1	2	3	4	5	6	7	8	9	10	11	12	Final
British Columbia (Finlay)	1	2	0	2	0	3	0	3	0	0	0	0	11
Northern Ontario (Walker)	0	0	1	0	1	0	1	0	1	1	2	0	7
