= 1941 Macdonald Brier =

Canadian men's curling championship

- Host city: Toronto, Ontario
- Arena: Granite Club
- Dates: March 3-7
- Winner: Alberta
- Curling club: Calgary CC, Calgary
- Skip: Howard Palmer
- Third: Jack Lebeau
- Second: Arthur Gooder
- Lead: St. Clair Webb

The 1941 Macdonald Brier, the Canadian men's national curling championship, was held from March 3 to 7, 1941 at the Granite Club in Toronto, Ontario.

Team Alberta, skipped by Howard Palmer, won the Brier Tankard by finishing round robin play with an 8-1 record. This was Alberta's third Brier championship.

This would be the last time to date that Toronto would host the Brier. As of 2024, Toronto still holds the record for hosting the most Briers with 14.

== Teams ==
The teams are listed as follows:

Alberta	British Columbia	Manitoba	New Brunswick	Northern Ontario
Calgary CC, Calgary Skip: Howard Palmer; Third: Jack Lebeau; Second: Arthur Gooder; Lead: St. Clair Webb	Vancouver CC, Vancouver Skip: Billy Finlay; Third: Roland David; Second: Frederick Tinling; Lead: William LeSage	Strathcona CC, Winnipeg Skip: Al Wakefield; Third: Douglas Adams; Second: Lionel Francis; Lead: Winston Anders	Thistle CC, Saint John Skip: Johnny Malcolm; Third: Donald Cameron; Second: Harry Magee; Lead: Nicholas Rockwell	Kirkland Lake CC, Kirkland Lake Skip: Don Best; Third: J.C. Tuck; Second: Thomas Rushworth; Lead: George Sayles
Nova Scotia	Ontario	Prince Edward Island	Quebec	Saskatchewan
Dartmouth CC, Dartmouth Skip: Fred Heath; Third: Duncan Campbell; Second: L.M. Adamson; Lead: Lyle Hopkins	Kitchener Granite CC, Kitchener Skip: Perry Hall; Third: J.A. Lucas; Second: Arthur Lehnen; Lead: William Henderson Jr.	Charlottetown CC, Charlottetown Skip: Russ Cruikshank; Third: Gordon Hughes; Second: Philip Cobb; Lead: Harry Sear	Quebec CC, Quebec City Skip: Charlie Handley; Third: Edmond Stamand (Note: Quebec's third Edmond Stamand fell ill prior to Draw 5 against British Columbia. Quebec shot with three players for both Draw 5 and 6 as second Hebert DuChene threw both second and third stones.); Second: Hebert DuChene; Lead: Samuel Trueman	Kinley CC, Kinley Skip: Bill Dunbar; Third: James McMahon; Second: James Beckett; Lead: A.E. McMahon

== Round robin standings ==
Key
Brier champion

Province	Skip	W	L	PF	PA
Alberta	Howard Palmer	8	1	124	68
Ontario	Perry Hall	7	2	112	82
Saskatchewan	Bill Dunbar	6	3	87	79
Northern Ontario	Don Best	6	3	104	80
Manitoba	Al Wakefield	5	4	90	79
British Columbia	Billy Finlay	5	4	92	83
Nova Scotia	Fred Heath	4	5	91	89
Prince Edward Island	Russ Cruikshank	2	7	89	109
New Brunswick	Johnny Malcolm	2	7	68	112
Quebec	Charlie Handley	0	9	54	130

== Round robin results ==
=== Draw 1 ===
Sheet A	1	2	3	4	5	6	7	8	9	10	11	12	Final
Quebec (Handley)	0	0	0	0	1	1	0	0	0	3	0	0	5
Alberta (Palmer)	4	3	2	4	0	0	3	3	2	0	1	1	23

Sheet B	1	2	3	4	5	6	7	8	9	10	11	12	Final
British Columbia (Finlay)	0	0	2	0	0	1	1	0	0	0	2	0	6
Manitoba (Wakefield)	1	2	0	1	1	0	0	3	1	2	0	1	12

Sheet C	1	2	3	4	5	6	7	8	9	10	11	12	Final
Saskatchewan (Dunbar)	1	0	0	1	2	0	1	0	2	2	0	1	10
Nova Scotia (Heath)	0	5	2	0	0	3	0	2	0	0	1	0	13

Sheet D	1	2	3	4	5	6	7	8	9	10	11	12	Final
Prince Edward Island (Cruikshank)	0	3	0	0	0	0	0	0	2	4	0	1	10
Northern Ontario (Best)	4	0	3	2	1	1	1	1	0	0	2	0	15

Sheet E	1	2	3	4	5	6	7	8	9	10	11	12	Final
New Brunswick (Malcolm)	0	2	0	3	0	0	1	0	1	0	2	0	9
Ontario (Hall)	2	0	1	0	5	4	0	5	0	1	0	3	21

=== Draw 2 ===
Sheet A	1	2	3	4	5	6	7	8	9	10	11	12	Final
Alberta (Palmer)	1	0	1	0	0	0	3	0	1	2	0	0	8
Saskatchewan (Dunbar)	0	3	0	1	1	1	0	1	0	0	1	1	9

Sheet B	1	2	3	4	5	6	7	8	9	10	11	12	Final
Manitoba (Wakefield)	1	0	1	2	0	2	5	0	1	0	0	0	12
Prince Edward Island (Cruikshank)	0	2	0	0	2	0	0	4	0	2	1	0	11

Sheet C	1	2	3	4	5	6	7	8	9	10	11	12	Final
Nova Scotia (Heath)	1	0	0	2	0	3	0	2	0	1	2	0	11
British Columbia (Finlay)	0	2	0	0	2	0	4	0	2	0	0	2	12

Sheet D	1	2	3	4	5	6	7	8	9	10	11	12	Final
Quebec (Handley)	1	0	1	0	0	0	2	0	1	0	0	1	6
Ontario (Hall)	0	2	0	3	2	1	0	1	0	2	0	0	11

Sheet E	1	2	3	4	5	6	7	8	9	10	11	12	Final
Northern Ontario (Best)	0	4	5	2	0	1	0	0	2	0	0	1	15
New Brunswick (Malcolm)	1	0	0	0	2	0	1	1	0	1	1	0	7

=== Draw 3 ===
Sheet A	1	2	3	4	5	6	7	8	9	10	11	12	Final
British Columbia (Finlay)	0	0	1	0	0	3	1	0	1	2	0	0	8
Alberta (Palmer)	1	1	0	1	2	0	0	2	0	0	2	4	13

Sheet B	1	2	3	4	5	6	7	8	9	10	11	12	Final
Prince Edward Island (Cruikshank)	0	1	0	0	1	0	2	0	0	1	0	1	6
Nova Scotia (Heath)	1	0	2	2	0	2	0	1	4	0	2	0	14

Sheet C	1	2	3	4	5	6	7	8	9	10	11	12	Final
Ontario (Hall)	0	2	0	3	0	1	0	2	0	1	0	1	10
Saskatchewan (Dunbar)	3	0	1	0	1	0	1	0	1	0	2	0	9

Sheet D	1	2	3	4	5	6	7	8	9	10	11	12	Final
Manitoba (Wakefield)	1	0	1	0	1	2	2	1	1	1	0	1	11
New Brunswick (Malcolm)	0	1	0	1	0	0	0	0	0	0	1	0	3

Sheet E	1	2	3	4	5	6	7	8	9	10	11	12	Final
Quebec (Handley)	0	0	0	0	0	0	0	0	1	0	1	0	2
Northern Ontario (Best)	1	1	1	3	3	1	2	1	0	2	0	2	17

=== Draw 4 ===
Sheet A	1	2	3	4	5	6	7	8	9	10	11	12	Final
New Brunswick (Malcolm)	0	0	1	1	0	2	0	0	0	1	0	2	7
Alberta (Palmer)	2	1	0	0	1	0	3	1	3	0	1	0	12

Sheet B	1	2	3	4	5	6	7	8	9	10	11	12	Final
Saskatchewan (Dunbar)	2	0	1	0	0	1	0	1	0	4	1	0	10
Manitoba (Wakefield)	0	2	0	1	1	0	2	0	1	0	0	2	9

Sheet C	1	2	3	4	5	6	7	8	9	10	11	12	Final
British Columbia (Finlay)	1	0	1	0	3	1	2	0	2	2	0	3	15
Northern Ontario (Best)	0	3	0	1	0	0	0	2	0	0	2	0	8

Sheet D	1	2	3	4	5	6	7	8	9	10	11	12	Final
Ontario (Hall)	3	3	0	4	1	0	1	0	4	1	1	0	18
Prince Edward Island (Cruikshank)	0	0	1	0	0	1	0	1	0	0	0	2	5

Sheet E	1	2	3	4	5	6	7	8	9	10	11	12	Final
Nova Scotia (Heath)	0	1	0	1	4	4	1	0	2	0	1	0	14
Quebec (Handley)	1	0	1	0	0	0	0	2	0	1	0	1	6

=== Draw 5 ===
Sheet A	1	2	3	4	5	6	7	8	9	10	11	12	Final
Alberta (Palmer)	1	1	1	2	2	0	2	1	2	0	2	0	14
Northern Ontario (Best)	0	0	0	0	0	0	0	0	0	3	0	2	5

Sheet B	1	2	3	4	5	6	7	8	9	10	11	12	Final
Ontario (Hall)	0	0	0	0	5	0	3	1	2	1	3	0	15
Manitoba (Wakefield)	2	1	1	1	0	1	0	0	0	0	0	1	7

Sheet C	1	2	3	4	5	6	7	8	9	10	11	12	Final
Saskatchewan (Dunbar)	2	0	2	0	0	3	2	0	0	2	1	0	12
Prince Edward Island (Cruikshank)	0	1	0	1	1	0	0	0	2	0	0	1	6

Sheet D	1	2	3	4	5	6	7	8	9	10	11	12	Final
Nova Scotia (Heath)	0	2	1	3	0	3	0	2	0	0	1	0	12
New Brunswick (Malcolm)	1	0	0	0	1	0	1	0	1	1	0	1	6

Sheet E	1	2	3	4	5	6	7	8	9	10	11	12	Final
British Columbia (Finlay)	3	3	1	1	1	0	1	1	1	0	2	1	15
Quebec (Handley)	0	0	0	0	0	3	0	0	0	1	0	0	4

=== Draw 6 ===
Sheet A	1	2	3	4	5	6	7	8	9	10	11	12	Final
Nova Scotia (Heath)	2	0	0	0	3	0	0	0	1	0	1	0	7
Alberta (Palmer)	0	2	1	1	0	3	1	3	0	1	0	0	12

Sheet B	1	2	3	4	5	6	7	8	9	10	11	12	Final
Northern Ontario (Best)	2	1	0	0	2	0	1	0	2	0	3	0	11
Ontario (Hall)	0	0	1	2	0	1	0	1	0	2	0	2	9

Sheet C	1	2	3	4	5	6	7	8	9	10	11	12	Final
Quebec (Handley)	1	0	2	0	0	0	2	1	0	0	1	0	7
Manitoba (Wakefield)	0	1	0	3	2	1	0	0	2	1	0	3	13

Sheet D	1	2	3	4	5	6	7	8	9	10	11	12	Final
Saskatchewan (Dunbar)	1	0	2	0	1	1	0	2	1	1	1	0	10
British Columbia (Finlay)	0	1	0	1	0	0	1	0	0	0	0	2	5

Sheet E	1	2	3	4	5	6	7	8	9	10	11	12	Final
New Brunswick (Malcolm)	1	0	0	0	0	2	0	1	0	1	2	0	7
Prince Edward Island (Cruikshank)	0	2	2	1	3	0	4	0	3	0	0	4	19

=== Draw 7 ===
Sheet A	1	2	3	4	5	6	7	8	9	10	11	12	Final
Alberta (Palmer)	3	0	0	3	1	0	4	0	1	6	0	0	18
Ontario (Hall)	0	2	1	0	0	1	0	2	0	0	1	2	9

Sheet B	1	2	3	4	5	6	7	8	9	10	11	12	Final
Prince Edward Island (Cruikshank)	1	0	0	0	3	0	1	0	1	0	1	1	8
British Columbia (Finlay)	0	2	0	1	0	3	0	4	0	1	0	0	11

Sheet C	1	2	3	4	5	6	7	8	9	10	11	12	Final
New Brunswick (Malcolm)	1	0	0	1	1	0	2	1	1	1	0	2	10
Quebec (Handley)	0	3	2	0	0	1	0	0	0	0	2	0	8

Sheet D	1	2	3	4	5	6	7	8	9	10	11	12	Final
Northern Ontario (Best)	2	0	0	0	0	0	1	0	2	0	1	1	7
Saskatchewan (Dunbar)	0	1	1	3	0	2	0	2	0	2	0	0	11

Sheet E	1	2	3	4	5	6	7	8	9	10	11	12	Final
Manitoba (Wakefield)	0	1	0	0	3	0	4	0	1	1	0	1	11
Nova Scotia (Heath)	1	0	1	1	0	1	0	1	0	0	2	0	7

=== Draw 8 ===
Sheet A	1	2	3	4	5	6	7	8	9	10	11	12	Final
Prince Edward Island (Cruikshank)	2	0	0	0	0	1	1	0	0	2	1	3	10
Alberta (Palmer)	0	4	1	3	2	0	0	2	1	0	0	0	13

Sheet B	1	2	3	4	5	6	7	8	9	10	11	12	Final
Quebec (Handley)	0	0	0	0	2	0	2	0	0	2	0	3	9
Saskatchewan (Dunbar)	3	2	0	2	0	1	0	2	2	0	1	0	13

Sheet C	1	2	3	4	5	6	7	8	9	10	11	12	13	Final
Ontario (Hall)	0	0	0	1	2	1	0	0	2	1	1	0	1	9
Nova Scotia (Heath)	3	1	1	0	0	0	0	2	0	0	0	1	0	8

Sheet D	1	2	3	4	5	6	7	8	9	10	11	12	Final
New Brunswick (Malcolm)	0	2	0	1	1	0	2	0	1	0	0	0	7
British Columbia (Finlay)	2	0	3	0	0	1	0	2	0	1	1	1	11

Sheet E	1	2	3	4	5	6	7	8	9	10	11	12	Final
Manitoba (Wakefield)	0	0	2	0	1	0	1	0	1	0	2	0	7
Northern Ontario (Best)	0	2	0	1	0	3	0	1	0	1	0	1	9

=== Draw 9 ===
Sheet A	1	2	3	4	5	6	7	8	9	10	11	12	Final
Alberta (Palmer)	1	0	2	1	0	1	3	0	2	0	1	0	11
Manitoba (Wakefield)	0	1	0	0	1	0	0	2	0	2	0	2	8

Sheet B	1	2	3	4	5	6	7	8	9	10	11	12	Final
Prince Edward Island (Cruikshank)	0	1	2	0	0	1	0	5	0	2	1	2	14
Quebec (Handley)	2	0	0	1	1	0	1	0	2	0	0	0	7

Sheet C	1	2	3	4	5	6	7	8	9	10	11	12	13	Final
Ontario (Hall)	2	0	1	0	3	0	0	0	1	1	1	0	1	10
British Columbia (Finlay)	0	1	0	2	0	2	1	1	0	0	0	2	0	9

Sheet D	1	2	3	4	5	6	7	8	9	10	11	12	Final
Northern Ontario (Best)	2	3	1	1	1	0	3	0	4	2	0	0	17
Nova Scotia (Heath)	0	0	0	0	0	1	0	2	0	0	1	1	5

Sheet E	1	2	3	4	5	6	7	8	9	10	11	12	Final
Saskatchewan (Dunbar)	0	1	0	0	0	0	1	0	1	0	0	0	3
New Brunswick (Malcolm)	1	0	1	1	1	1	0	3	0	2	1	1	12
