= Bert Hall (curler) =

Canadian curler (born 1903)

Medal record

Men's Curling

Representing Ontario

Macdonald Brier
Gold medal – first place	1939 Toronto	

Bert C. Hall (February 3, 1903–January 13, 1960) was a Canadian curler from Kitchener, Ontario. He was the skip of the champion Ontario team at the 1939 Macdonald Brier, Canada's national men's curling championship, and was a six-time Ontario champion.

== Early life and career ==
Hall was born in Plattsville, Ontario, the son of Stephen Hall. He moved to Kitchener in 1927. He curled and played ice hockey in his youth. His first curling success came in 1922 at the age of 19, when he won the Western Ontario Colts, playing third for brother Perry. They won the event again in 1925.

After moving to Kitchener, he won several curling tournaments, including the Royal York Trophy three times (1932, 1937, 1938).

== Provincial champions ==
Hall won his first of six provincial championships in 1938, when he and his rink of brother Perry, ice hockey player Ernie Parkes and cricketer Campbell Seagram defeated T. S. Graham of the Toronto Curling Club in the final of the Ontario British Consols Trophy event, 11–9. He went through the event undefeated. As Ontario champions, the team represented Ontario at the 1938 Macdonald Brier, Canada's national championship. There, Hall led his rink to a 4–5 record.

Hall and his rink won a second straight provincial title in 1939. The team defeated Harvey Sproule of the High Park Club in the Consols final, 14–4. The team represented Ontario at the 1939 Macdonald Brier, where they finished the round robin with an 8–1 record, tied for first place with Team Manitoba, skipped by Ross Kennedy. This forced a tiebreaker match between both teams, which Ontario won 12–10, and with it the Brier championship. After their championship, the team was honoured with a civic banquet, where they received wrist watches, and two travelling bags each.

Hall won the first of two Ontario Silver Tankards in 1940. He and brother Perry skipped Kitchener Granite rinks to the title, defeating rinks from Barrie by a combined score of 35–25, in the double rink provincial championship.

Team Hall began their Brier title defence by winning a third straight Ontario title, defeating Charlie Mason of the Toronto Granite Club, 13–10 in the 1940 provincial final. At the 1940 Macdonald Brier, the team could not find the same success, and finished the tournament with a 4–5 record.

In 1941, the two Hall brothers formed their own rinks for playdowns, with Perry defeating Bert in a group final before the provincial championship. Perry Hall went on to win the provincial championship, his fourth straight.

In 1942, Hall attempted to sign up for World War II, but was dismissed as medically unfit, and told to "stay off the ice", which he did not do, despite crippling arthritis.

In 1943, both he and brother Perry skipped the Granite Club to their second Silver Tankard title. They defeated rinks from the Hamilton Thistle Club, skipped by Ross Tarlton and Gordon Campbell.

Hall, and his rink of Seagram, L. G. Shantz and Jack Luxton made it to the Ontario final again in 1943, but lost to Ken Wadsworth of the Toronto Granite Club, 9–4.

The Hall brothers re-united for the 1944 season, with Perry skipping and Bert throwing third stones. The team won the 1944 provincial championship, defeating A. J. Parkhill of Oshawa in the British Consols trophy final, 10–5. The team won the provincial championship again in 1945, defeating W.C. Morris of Toronto in the final, 11–4. The Brier was not held either year due to World War II.

Hall won his final provincial championship in 1946, still playing third for his brother. The team defeated Ross Tarlton of the Hamilton Thistle Club 12–7 in the Ontario final. With the war now over, the Brier returned in 1946, and as provincial champions, the rink represented Ontario once again. At the Brier, the team went 5–4.

In 1959, he was given a life membership from the Ontario Curling Association.

== Death and personal life ==
Hall died in Tucson, Arizona in 1960. He had been wintering there since 1952 for health reasons. He was buried at the Ayr cemetery.

In addition to his brother Perry being a curler, his other brother Russell competed at the 1932 Winter Olympics where curling was a demonstration sport.

In Kitchener, Hall worked as a car salesman, and sold his business in 1952 to Orr Automobiles. He served as president of the Granite Curling Club for the 1944–45 season. In addition to curling, he also enjoyed fly fishing, hunting, boating and golfing.
