= Howard Palmer =

Canadian curler

- Curler
- Born: c. 1907; Manitoba, Canada
- Died: November 18, 1969 (aged 62); Lethbridge, Alberta, Canada
Medal record
Representing Alberta
Macdonald Brier
Gold medal – first place	1941 Toronto
Silver medal – second place	1935 Toronto

T. F. Howard Palmer (c. 1907 – November 18, 1969) was a Canadian curler.

Palmer was the skip of the 1941 Brier Champion team, representing Alberta. He also won the Centennial Championship in Hamilton, Ontario, 1956.

A native of Calgary, Palmer was inducted into the Alberta Sports Hall of Fame in 1970. He died in 1969 at the age of 62 in Lethbridge.
