= Ernie Parkes =

Canadian ice hockey player

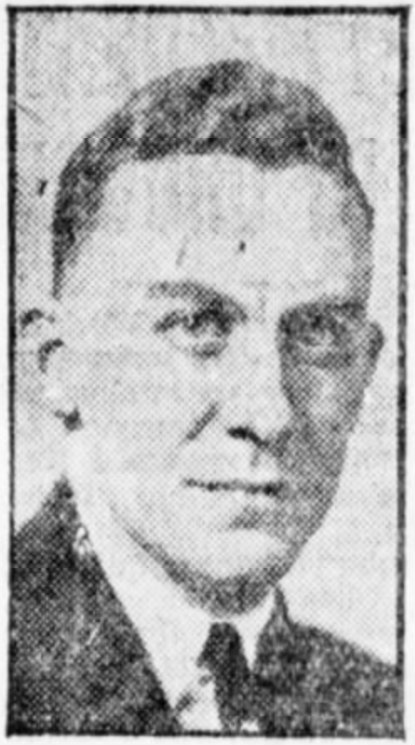
- Born: November 4, 1898 Victoria, British Columbia, Canada
- Died: July 7, 1948 (aged 49) Woodstock, Ontario, Canada
- Height: 5 ft 10 in (178 cm)
- Weight: 150 lb (68 kg; 10 st 10 lb)
- Position: Right wing
- Shot: Right
- Played for: Vancouver Millionaires; Montreal Maroons
- Playing career: 1914–1925
Medal record
Men's curling
Representing Ontario
Macdonald Brier
Gold medal – first place	1939 Toronto

George Ernest Parkes (November 4, 1898 – July 7, 1948) was a Canadian professional ice hockey player and curler. He played 84 games in the Pacific Coast Hockey Association with the Vancouver Millionaires/Maroons between 1921 and 1924 and then 17 games in the National Hockey League with the Montreal Maroons during the 1924–25 season. Before turning professional he spent several years in the senior Ontario Hockey League. In curling, he was a member of the 1939 Macdonald Brier championship team.

== Career ==
Parkes was born in Victoria, British Columbia, but grew up in Dunnville, Ontario. He played in the Ontario Hockey Association senior league from 1914 to 1921 and was named to the league's first all-star team in 1919 and 1920. In 1921, Parkes signed with the Pacific Coast Hockey Association's Vancouver Millionaires, where he played for three years. He then spent one season with the Montreal Maroons of the National Hockey League in 1924–25.

Parkes also curled, and played in three straight Briers on a team skipped by Bert Hall. They represented Ontario from 1938 to 1940, winning the Brier in 1939.

Parkes died in Woodstock, Ontario, in 1948. He was survived by his wife and three children.

== Career statistics ==
=== Regular season and playoffs ===
			Regular season					Playoffs
Season	Team	League	GP	G	A	Pts	PIM	GP	G	A	Pts	PIM
1914–15	Toronto Argonauts	OHA Sr	2	3	0	3	—	—	—	—	—	—
1915–16	Toronto Argonauts	OHA Sr	10	13	0	13	—	2	0	0	0	0
1916–17	Toronto Riversides	OHA Sr	7	6	0	6	—	2	0	0	0	3
1917–18	Kitchener Greenshirts	OHA Sr	9	29	0	29	—	5	8	0	8	—
1918–19	Kitchener Greenshirts	OHA Sr	9	7	8	15	—	—	—	—	—	—
1919–20	Kitchener Greenshirts	OHA Sr	8	22	6	28	—	2	1	1	2	—
1920–21	Kitchener Greenshirts	OHA Sr	7	6	2	8	—	1	1	0	1	—
1921–22	Vancouver Millionaires	PCHA	24	8	3	11	0	4	0	0	0	0
1921–22	Vancouver Millionaires	St-Cup	—	—	—	—	—	5	0	3	3	0
1922–23	Vancouver Millionaires	PCHA	30	11	4	15	2	2	2	0	2	0
1922–23	Vancouver Millionaires	St-Cup	—	—	—	—	—	4	0	2	2	2
1923–24	Vancouver Maroons	PCHA	30	3	1	4	2	5	1	0	1	0
1923–24	Vancouver Maroons	St-Cup	—	—	—	—	—	2	0	0	0	0
1924–25	Montreal Maroons	NHL	17	0	0	0	2	—	—	—	—	—
PCHA totals			84	22	8	30	4	11	3	0	3	0
NHL totals			17	0	0	0	2	—	—	—	—	—
