= Department of Infrastructure (Manitoba) =

Provincial government department in Manitoba

Manitoba Transportation and Infrastructure
Agency overview
- Jurisdiction: Manitoba
- Employees: 1,960 FTE (2019/20)
- Annual budget: $649.2 m CAD (2019/20)
- Minister responsible: Lisa Naylor, Minister of Transportation and Infrastructure
- Deputy Minister responsible: Ryan Klos, Deputy Minister of Transportation and Infrastructure
- Key document: Traffic and Transportation Modernization Act
- Website: gov.mb.ca/mti/index.html

Manitoba Transportation and Infrastructure (French: Transportation Infrastructure Manitoba), commonly known as Manitoba Infrastructure (French: Infrastructures du Manitoba), is the provincial government department responsible for managing infrastructure in Manitoba. It is in charge of "the development of transportation policy and legislation, and [of] the management of the province’s vast infrastructure network."

Manitoba Infrastructure was initially known as Public Works, which changed to Government Services in 1968, when the province expanded the department to include the provision of common services for other governmental departments. In 2016, the department name would be changed to its current one.

The department operates under the oversight of the Minister of Transportation and Infrastructure (Ministre des Transports et de l’Infrastructure), currently Lisa Naylor, who was appointed to the portfolio on 18 October 2023 by the New Democratic government of Wab Kinew.

== Organization ==
Traffic and Transportation Modernization Act
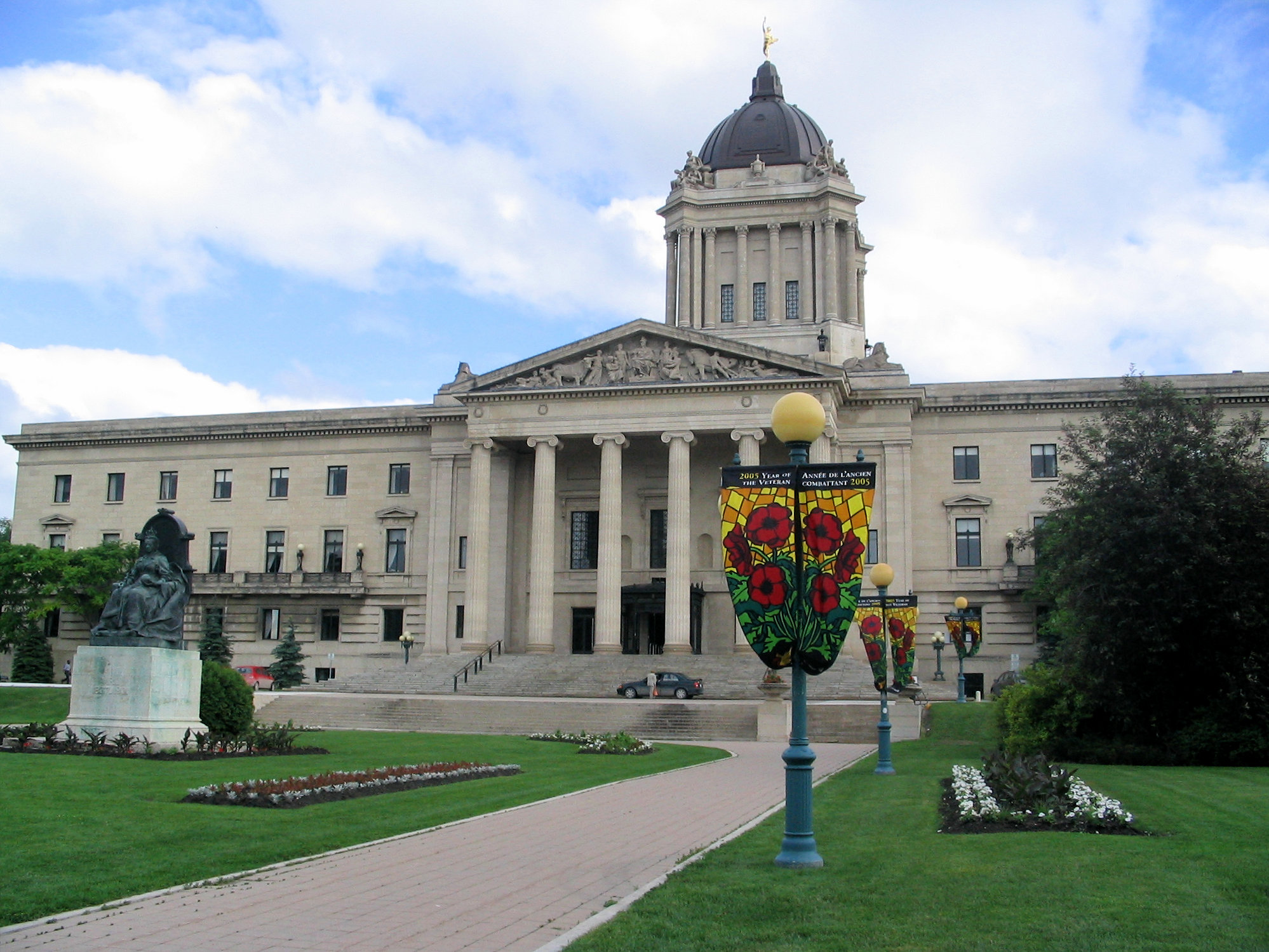

Legislative Assembly of Manitoba
- Enacted by: 3rd Session, 41st Legislature
- Effective: 1 March 2019

Legislative history
- Bill title: Bill 14
- Status: Current legislation

Manitoba Infrastructure oversees the provision of such services as property management, procurement, water bomber operations, air ambulance flights, fleet vehicles, stewardship of Crown Lands, and the security of provincial government buildings.

Duties of the department related to transportation include corporate policy, provincial legislation development, enforcement of motor carrier safety and regulation, carrier permits, and the management of sustainable transportation initiatives.

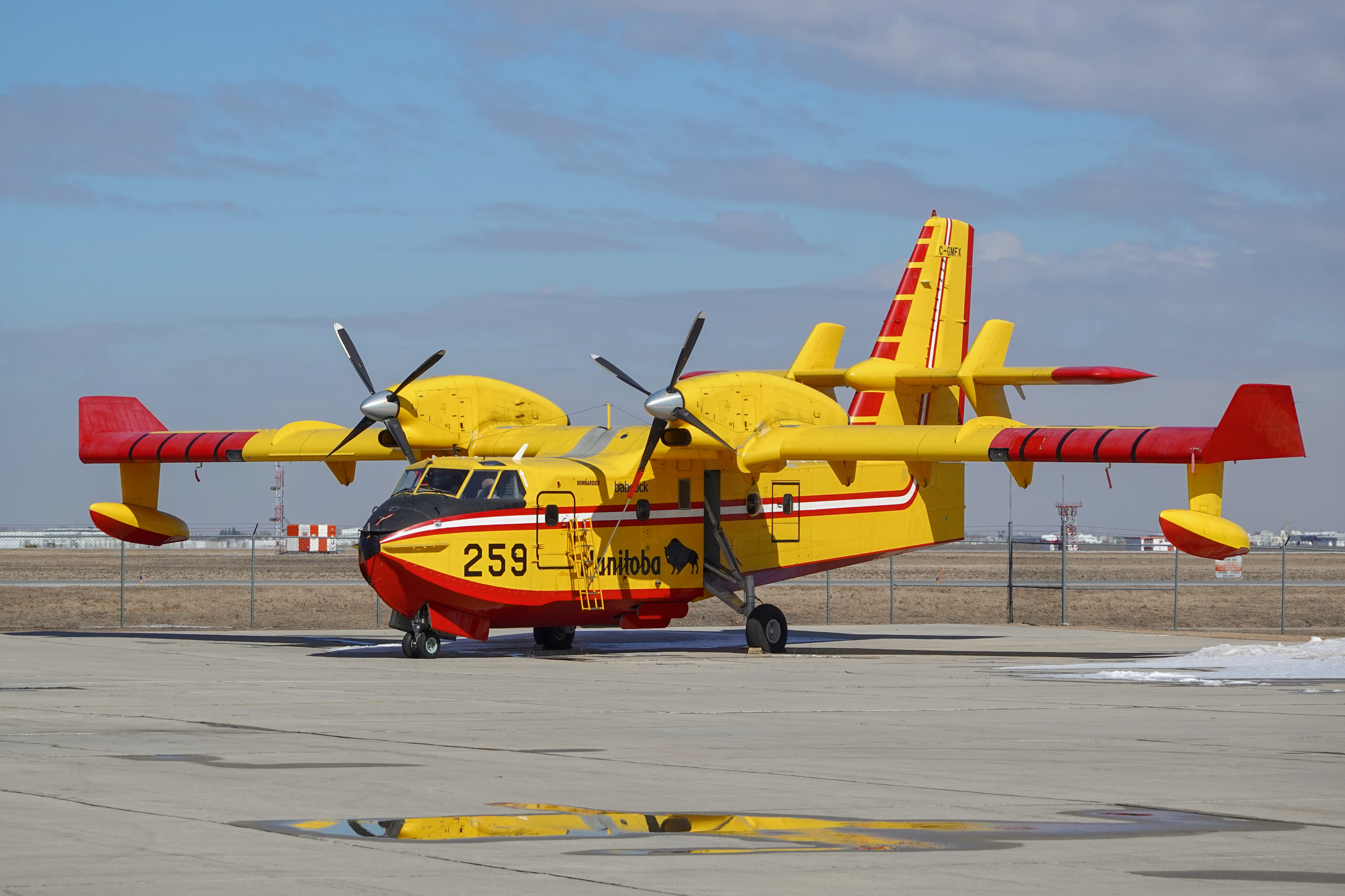
A Canadair CL-415 owned by Manitoba to combat wildfires

Regarding water control, drainage, and management of transportation infrastructure, responsibilities of the department include the construction, maintenance, and operation of: 19,000 kilometres (12,000 mi) of all-weather roads, 2,200 km (1,400 mi) of winter roads, and 4,700 km (2,900 mi) of drains; as well as 75 dams, 61 reservoirs, 41 pumping stations, 24 northern airports, and more than 21,000 bridges and culverts, among others.

Manitoba Infrastructure regional offices
| Region | Regional office | Sub-regional office |
|---|---|---|
| 1 – Eastern | Steinbach | Winnipeg (PTH 1 East) |
| 2 – South Central | Portage la Prairie | Arborg |
| 2 – South Central | Portage la Prairie | Carman |
| 3 – South Western | Brandon | Boissevain |
| 3 – South Western | Brandon | Birtle |
| 4 - West Central | Dauphin | Swan River |
| 4 - West Central | Dauphin | Ashern |
| 5 - Northern | Thompson | The Pas |

Manitoba Transportation and Infrastructure includes the following agencies and boards:

- CentrePort Canada
- Disaster Assistance Appeal Board
- Land Value Appraisal Commission
- Licence Suspension Appeal Board
- Medical Review Committee

== History ==
=== Public Works (1871–1967) ===
In the beginning, the Minister of Agriculture was ex officio the minister responsible for public works. The first Minister of Public Works and Agriculture was appointed by the Lieutenant Governor on 13 January 1871, as a member of Manitoba's Executive Council, established after the first elections in the newly-established province of Manitoba. This new portfolio would carry out the responsibilities of the Board of Public Works and the Committee of Economy from the defunct Council of Assiniboia, as well as the responsibility of overseeing the provincial government's involvement in the development and maintenance of roads, bridges, ferries, and related services.

In 1874, following the division of the Department of Public Works and Agriculture's functions into two separate departments—and the resignation of Edward Hay as minister—the Department of Public Works was established. This new department was responsible for directing all construction, maintenance and repair for all public works of the Province of Manitoba.

In its initial years, the department was primarily concerned with the construction of provincial roads and government facilities. However, in the late 19th century, as Manitoba's population increased significantly, the Department of Public Works became increasingly important in providing services to new arrivals. As Manitoba grew into the modern era, drainage projects, bridges, and culverts also became increasingly necessary. The department would also begin to take on other public works projects, including the drilling of wells; expanding the highways system; building government buildings/institutions and offices; and constructing schools and grain elevators. Such would also eventually include the management of the Legislative Building, the Law Courts and Land Titles Buildings, the provincial prison in Headingly, the Hospitals for Mental Diseases in Brandon and Selkirk, the Manitoba School for the Deaf, and various other facilities.

In 1930, the Highway Traffic Act was passed. Between the 1940s and 1950s, the department put its primary attention towards expanding and maintaining provincial highways, as well as towards the ongoing management and maintenance of government spaces. This increasing concern over highways and roads resulted in the creation of the Highways Branch. With the passage of the Public Works Act in 1943, the Highways Branch of the department was formed, under which all functions related to the planning, design, construction and maintenance of Manitoba highways, roads, and bridges were amalgamated and transferred to.

In 1959, the Bridge Office (renamed the Bridge Division) was created within the Highways Branch. In 1960, the Branch received its very own designated Assistant Deputy Minister, coinciding with an increase in construction projects and traffic studies, as well as in funding and staff. In this time, the Planning and Design Division was established within the Branch in an attempt to meet the growing challenges related to planning, design and engineering presented by modern highway and bridge construction.

=== Division into two ministries (1965–99) ===
A new Public Works Act and Highway Traffic Act were passed in 1965, resulting in considerable changes to the department's structure. Most notably, Public Works was divided into two separate departments: the Departments of Public Works and of Highways, though both would continue to share a single ministry.

The Department of Highways was created out of Public Works' former Highways Branch as an independent department. This new Department continued the role it previously had under Public Works, overseeing the construction and maintenance of Manitoba's road and highway system. Also part of the 1965 Act, the functions related to the acquisition of land for use in provincial works projects were consolidated within the Land Acquisition Branch and the Land Acquisition Commission.

In 1968–69, the government of Walter Weir further expanded the role of the Public Works department to provide common services needed by all departments, including the "design, construction, acquisition. and maintenance of government buildings and property; the procurement and maintenance of government vehicles and equipment; and the delivery of postal, printing and information services to the government."

To signal the change in its operation, the department was intended to be renamed the Government Services; however, the name change would not be affirmed by the legislature, and the department continued to operate as Public Works until 1978.

At the same time, the Minister of Highways was renamed Minister of Transportation. This name was kept by the NDP administration of Edward Schreyer, who assigned Joseph Borowski to the role in 1969, while changing the "Minister of Public Works" to the "Minister of Government Services" with the appointment of Howard Pawley.

In 1970, the functions of the Motor Vehicle Branch, held by the Minister of Public Utilities, was transferred to the Highways minister's portfolio, which included responsibility for the facilitation of road safety and the administration of programs like driver's education. Later that year, the Department of Highways was formally consolidated with Public Works to create the Department of Public Works and Highways. Nonetheless, both Public Works and Highways continued to operate as independent departments until they were officially separated and restructured in 1977/78.

==== Highways & Transportation and Government Services ====
The departmental restructuring in 1978 resulted in the Conservative government of Sterling Lyon dissolving the Departments of Highways and of Public Works departments, to be replaced by two new respective departments, both simultaneously headed by Harry Enns in 1978.

The new Department of Highways and Transportation (French: Ministère de la voirie et des transports) was established as an independent department following the removal of the Highways department from the umbrella of the Public Works and Highways portfolio. This new department took responsibility over the construction and maintenance of the road and highway system of Manitoba, as well as over the Motor Vehicle Branch (later known as the Driver and Vehicle Licensing Division), which looked over highway safety and regulation.

Highways and Transportation also adopted the operation of Transportation Services from the Department of Northern Affairs and Transportation Services, which would add transportation-related functions under its purview. This included responsibility over Manitoba's freight and passenger road, rail, and air transportation, as well as over the conducting of highway- and transportation-related land surveys. The latter responsibility, however, would be transferred to the Department of Natural Resources in 1994.

On the other side, the newly-formed Department of Government Services absorbed the functions of the former Public Works department. This new department was in charge of various central support services to Cabinet and Treasury Board, as well as Manitoba government departments, agencies, boards, corporations, and commissions.

In 1980, Government Services began to administer the Emergency Measures Organization, providing overall disaster and emergency planning, training, and coordination in Manitoba. From 1980 to 1982, the department broadened its functions to include responsibility for two independent bodies who report directly to the Minister: the Land Value Appraisal Commission and the Manitoba Disaster Assistance Board. Also in 1980, the department temporarily took responsibility over the Queen's Printer, the Advertising Audit Office, and the Word Processing Consulting Services Branch; these would also be taken out of the department's portfolio by 1983.

In 1981, the Pawley-led NDP government appointed Sam Uskiw as both Minister of Highways and Transportation and of Government Services.

=== Reconsolidation (1999–present) ===
In 1999, the incoming government of Gary Doer combined the Departments of Government Services and of Highways and Transportation into a single portfolio: Manitoba Highways and Government Services.

In January 2001, while the department formally changed to Transportation and Government Services, both the Government Services section and the Highways & Transportation continued to operate as individual entities.

The Highways & Transportation section carried out its mandate through 4 key divisions:

- Policy, Planning and Development — policy, planning, design and development of the transportation infrastructure in Manitoba;
- Construction and Maintenance — construction and maintenance of provincial highways, bridges, and structures
- Engineering and Technical Services — planning and technical support for highway construction in Manitoba; and
- Driver and Vehicle Licensing — regulating transportation via driver licensing, vehicle registration, etc.

The Highways & Transportation section was also in charge of administering the Motor Transport Board, the Highway Traffic Board, the Taxicab Board, the License Suspension Appeal Board, and the Medical Review Committee. In addition to the provision of various support services, Government Services was also responsible for the Land Value Appraisal Commission, the Manitoba Disaster Assistance Appeals Board, and the Manitoba Emergency Measures Organization (MEMO).

In 2006, the department would be restructured and renamed once again, this time into Manitoba Infrastructure and Transportation. A decade later, in 2016, the name was shortened to the Department of Infrastructure by the incoming government of Brian Pallister, and has retained that name since.

== Minister of Infrastructure ==
The Minister of Infrastructure (French: Ministre de l'Infrastructure) is the cabinet position in the government of Manitoba charged with oversight of the province's Department of Infrastructure.

The current Minister of Infrastructure is Lisa Naylor, who was appointed to the portfolio on 18 Oct 2023 by the New Democratic government of Wab Kinew.

Between 1871 and 1967, the portfolio (then titled Minister of Public Works) held oversight over roads and government buildings. Between 1967 and 1999, the portfolio was divided into two positions: Minister of Public Works and the Minister of Highways, both remaining distinct through various administrations and name changes. On occasion, both portfolios were held by the same individual at the same time. In 1999, the two ministries were once again united.

=== Minister history ===
In the beginning, the Minister of Agriculture was ex officio the minister responsible for public works. The first Minister of Public Works and Agriculture was appointed by the Lieutenant Governor on 13 January 1871, as a member of Manitoba's Executive Council, established after the first elections in the newly-established province of Manitoba.

The portfolio would carry out the responsibilities of the Board of Public Works from the defunct Council of Assiniboia, and the minister was responsible for overseeing the Manitoba government's involvement in the development and maintenance of roads, bridges, ferries, and related services. Manitoba's first Minister of Public Works and Agriculture was Thomas Howard, who resigned from the position after only ten days in order to exchange portfolios with Provincial Secretary Alfred Boyd.

In December 1874, the ministry was divided, creating a separate Minister of Public Works and a Minister of Agriculture.

In the late 19th century, as Manitoba's population increased significantly, the Department of Public Works became increasingly important in providing services to new arrivals. During the premiership of Rodmond Roblin (1900–15), the department became especially powerful as a tool of government patronage. Minister Robert Rogers, who held the portfolio for 11 years, was sometimes regarded as the second-most-important figure in the Roblin government.

In the latter part of 1914, Public Works Minister Walter Humphries Montague was forced to announce that expenditures for the province's new legislative buildings would be exceeded by 50%. Roblin was forced to appoint a Royal Commission to study the controversy, and his government resigned from office the following year after the commission report identified instances government corruption and kickbacks. Montague was indicted on fraud charges, but died before legal proceedings could begin.

In later years, however, specific government works were taken away from the Public Works ministry and allocated to separate portfolios. The position gradually came to have less authority, though it remained responsible for road construction and related projects in mid-century. Upon the establishment of an all-party coalition government in 1940, Progressive Conservative (PC) leader Errick French Willis was appointed as Minister of Public Works under a Liberal-Progressive premier, holding the position for 10 years, until the PCs left the coalition.

In 1967, the Department of Highways was created and the Public Works minister at the time, Walter Weir, changed his title to Minister of Highways. However, the Public Works portfolio still remained, and was appointed to Stewart McLean later that year, while Weir continued in the Highways position until his election as premier of Manitoba.

In 1968, the Weir government expanded the role of the Department of Public Works to provide common services needed by all departments. To signal the change in its operation, the department was thereby renamed the Government Services, headed by Thelma Forbes, who kept the "Minister of Public Works" title. Also that year, the Minister of Highways was renamed Minister of Transportation, to which McLean was appointed. This name was kept by the NDP administration of Edward Schreyer, who assigned Joseph Borowski to the role in 1969, while changing the "Minister of Public Works" to the "Minister of Government Services" with the appointment of Howard Pawley. In 1970, Peter Burtniak became Minister of Highways (re-renamed from Min. Transportation) after Borowski left the portfolio to become Minister of Public Works (re-renamed).

In 1970, the Department of Highways was formally consolidated with Public Works to create the Department of Public Works and Highways. Nonetheless, both Public Works and Highways continued to operate as independent departments until they were officially separated and restructured in 1977/78. This restructuring resulted in the Conservative government of Sterling Lyon dissolving both, to be replaced by the Departments of Government Services and the Department of Highways and Transportation, the two simultaneously headed by Harry Enns in 1978.

In 1981, the Pawley-led NDP government appointed Sam Uskiw as both Minister of Highways and Transportation and of Government Services. In 1987, Highways and Transportation was re-renamed to just the Department of Highways.

In 1999, the departments of Highways and Transportation merged with that of Government Services; this new portfolio was called the Ministry of Highways and Government Services. Its name was changed to the Ministry of Transportation and Government Services on 17 January 2001, and then to the Ministry of Infrastructure and Transportation on 21 September 2006.

After the provincial general election of 2016, the Manitoba cabinet was re-organized: the ministry's infrastructure responsibilities were assigned to the new Ministry of Infrastructure under the direction of Blaine Pedersen, whereas transportation policy formed part of the new ministry of Growth, Enterprise and Trade under the direction of Cliff Cullen. The transportation portfolio today, however, remains part of the Department of Infrastructure.

=== List of ministers ===
==== 1871–1967 ====
Ministers of Public Works, 1871–1967
| Name | Party | Took office | Left office |
Minister of Public Works and Agriculture
| Thomas Howard | Cons. | January 13, 1871 | January 23, 1871 |
| Alfred Boyd | Gov. | January 23, 1871 | December 14, 1871 |
| John Norquay | Cons. | December 14, 1871 | July 8, 1874 |
| Edward Hay | Lib. | July 8, 1874 | December 2, 1874 |
Minister of Public Works
| Joseph Royal | Cons. | December 3, 1874 | May 11, 1876 |
| John Norquay | Cons. | May 11, 1876 | October 16, 1878 |
| Joseph Royal | Cons. | October 16, 1878 | May 1879 |
| Samuel Biggs | Gov. | May 1879 | June 1879 |
| Corydon Brown | Lib. | June 1879 | August 27, 1886 |
| David H. Wilson | Cons. | August 27, 1886 | December 24, 1887 |
| David H. Wilson | Cons. | December 26, 1887 | January 19, 1888 |
| James Smart | Lib. | January 19, 1888 | May 26, 1892 |
| Robert Watson | Lib. | May 26, 1892 | January 6, 1900 |
| David H. McFadden | Cons. | January 10, 1900 | December 20, 1900 |
| Robert Rogers | Cons. | December 20, 1900 | October 7, 1911 |
| Colin H. Campbell | Cons. | October 11, 1911 | November 4, 1913 |
| Walter Humphries Montague | Cons. | November 4, 1913 | May 12, 1915 |
| Thomas Herman Johnson | Lib. | May 15, 1915 | November 10, 1917 |
| George Grierson | Lib. | November 10, 1917 | January 20, 1921 |
| Charles Duncan McPherson | Lib. | January 20, 1921 | August 8, 1922 |
| William Clubb | UFM | August 8, 1922 | February 22, 1929 |
| Donald McKenzie (Acting) | Prog. | February 22, 1929 | May 18, 1929 |
| William Clubb | Prog. | May 18, 1929 | 1932 |
| William Clubb | Lib-Prog. | 1932 | November 4, 1940 |
| Errick Willis | PC | November 4, 1940 | August 19, 1950 |
| William Morton | Lib-Prog. | August 19, 1950 | January 28, 1955 |
| Francis Campbell Bell | Lib-Prog. | January 25, 1955 | July 6, 1956 |
| Ronald Robertson | Lib-Prog. | July 6, 1956 | June 30, 1958 |
| Errick Willis | Cons. | June 30, 1958 | December 21, 1959 |
| John Thompson | PC | December 21, 1959 | October 24, 1962 |
| Walter Weir | PC | November 5, 1962 | July 22, 1967 |

==== 1967–99 ====
Ministers of Public Works and Ministers of Highways, 1967–99
| Ministers of Public Works | | | | | Ministers of Highways / Transport | | | | |
| Name | Minister of... | Party | Took office | Left office | Name | Minister of... | Party | Took office | Left office |
|---|---|---|---|---|---|---|---|---|---|
| Stewart McLean | Public Works | PC | July 22, 1967 | September 24, 1968 | Walter Weir | Highways | PC | July 1, 1967 | November 27, 1967 |
| Stewart McLean | Public Works | PC | July 22, 1967 | September 24, 1968 | Harry Enns (acting) | Highways | PC | November 27, 1967 | September 24, 1968 |
| Thelma Forbes | Government Services | PC | September 24, 1968 | July 15, 1969 | Stewart McLean | Transportation | PC | September 24, 1968 | July 15, 1969 |
| Howard Pawley | Government Services | NDP | July 15, 1969 | December 18, 1969 | Joseph Borowski | Transportation | NDP | July 17, 1969 | September 8, 1971 |
| Russell Paulley | Government Services | NDP | December 18, 1969 | September 3, 1970 | Joseph Borowski | Transportation | NDP | July 17, 1969 | September 8, 1971 |
| Joseph Borowski | Public Works | NDP | September 3, 1970 | September 8, 1971 | Joseph Borowski | Transportation | NDP | July 17, 1969 | September 8, 1971 |
| Russell Doern (Note: Doern was acting minister until April 13, 1972.) | Public Works | NDP | September 9, 1971 | October 24, 1977 | Peter Burtniak | Highways (Note: Beginning 22 September 1976, this Minister was also the Minister responsible for Manitoba Public Insurance Corporation.) | NDP | September 9, 1971 | October 24, 1977 |
| Harry Enns | Government Services | PC | October 24, 1977 | October 20, 1978 | Harry Enns | Highways | PC | October 24, 1977 | October 20, 1978 |
| Sidney Spivak | Government Services | PC | October 20, 1978 | April 12, 1979 | Harry Enns | Highways and Transport | PC | October 20, 1978 | November 15, 1979 |
| Harry Enns | Government Services | PC | April 12, 1979 | January 16, 1981 | Donald Orchard | Highways and Transport | PC | November 15, 1979 | November 30, 1981 |
| Warner H. Jorgenson | Government Services | PC | January 16, 1981 | November 30, 1981 | Donald Orchard | Highways and Transport | | November 15, 1979 | November 30, 1981 |
| Sam Uskiw | Government Services | NDP | November 30, 1981 | August 20, 1982 | Sam Uskiw | Highways and Transportation | NDP | November 30, 1981 | November 4, 1983 |
| John Plohman | Government Services | NDP | August 20, 1982 | November 4, 1983 | Sam Uskiw | Highways and Transportation | NDP | November 30, 1981 | November 4, 1983 |
| Aimé Adam | Government Services | NDP | November 4, 1983 | January 30, 1985 | John Plohman | Highways and Transportation | NDP | November 4, 1983 | September 21, 1987 |
| John Plohman | Government Services | NDP | January 30, 1985 | February 4, 1987 | John Plohman | Highways and Transportation | NDP | November 4, 1983 | September 21, 1987 |
| Harry Harapiak | Government Services | NDP | February 4, 1987 | May 9, 1988 | John Bucklaschuk | Highways | NDP | September 21, 1987 | May 9, 1988 |
| Albert Driedger | Government Services | PC | May 9, 1988 | February 5, 1991 | Albert Driedger | Highways and Transportation | PC | May 9, 1988 | September 10, 1993 |
| Gerald Ducharme | Government Services | PC | February 5, 1991 | May 9, 1995 | Albert Driedger | Highways and Transportation | PC | May 9, 1988 | September 10, 1993 |
| Gerald Ducharme | Government Services | PC | February 5, 1991 | May 9, 1995 | Glen Findlay | Highways and Transportation | PC | September 10, 1993 | February 5, 1999 |
| Brian Pallister | Government Services | PC | May 9, 1995 | January 6, 1997 | Glen Findlay | Highways and Transportation | PC | September 10, 1993 | February 5, 1999 |
| Frank Pitura | Government Services | PC | January 6, 1997 | October 5, 1999 | Glen Findlay | Highways and Transportation | PC | September 10, 1993 | February 5, 1999 |
| Frank Pitura | Government Services | PC | January 6, 1997 | October 5, 1999 | Darren Praznik | Highways and Transportation | | February 5, 1999 | October 5, 1999 |

==== 1999–present ====
Ministers of Infrastructure, 1999–present
| Name | Party | Took office | Left office |
Minister of Highways and Government Services
| Steve Ashton | NDP | October 5, 1999 | January 17, 2001 |
Minister of Transportation and Government Services
| Steve Ashton | NDP | January 17, 2001 | September 25, 2002 |
| Scott Smith | NDP | September 25, 2002 | November 4, 2003 |
| Ron Lemieux | NDP | November 4, 2003 | September 21, 2006 |
Minister of Infrastructure and Transportation
| Ron Lemieux | NDP | September 21, 2006 | November 3, 2009 |
| Steve Ashton | NDP | November 3, 2009 | December 22, 2014 |
| Ron Kostyshyn | NDP | December 23, 2014 | April 29, 2015 |
| Steve Ashton | NDP | April 29, 2015 | May 3, 2016 |
Minister of Infrastructure
| Blaine Pedersen | PC | May 3, 2016 | August 16, 2017 |
| Ron Schuler | PC | August 17, 2017 | December 30, 2021 |
| Reg Helwer | PC | December 30, 2021 | January 18, 2022 |
Minister of Transportation and Infrastructure
| Doyle Piwniuk | PC | January 18, 2022 | October 18, 2023 |
| Lisa Naylor | NDP | October 18, 2023 | incumbent |
