= John Gunne =

John Gunne may refer to:

- John Gunne (Manitoba politician)
- John Gunne (English politician)

== See also ==
- John Gunn (disambiguation)
