= Gunne =

Gunne is a surname. Notable people with the surname include:

- Carl Gunne (1893–1979), Swedish painter
- Fintan Gunne (born 2003), Irish rugby union player
- John Gunne (English politician) (fl. 1397), English politician
- John Gunne (Manitoba politician) (1872–1935), Canadian physician and politician

== See also ==
- Gunn (surname)
- Gunner (name)
- Gunnes, a surname
