= John A. Campbell (Manitoba politician) =

Canadian politician (1872–1963)

John Archibald Campbell QC (April 19, 1872 – November 26, 1963) was a politician in Manitoba, Canada. He served in the Legislative Assembly of Manitoba from 1907 to 1910, as a member of the Manitoba Liberal Party and then in the House of Commons of Canada from 1917 to 1921 as a member of the Unionist Party.

Campbell was born in Clinton, Ontario, the son of John M. Campbell and Mary McLagon, and moved to Manitoba with his family in 1880, settling to Winnipeg. He was educated at Manitoba College, and received a Bachelor of Arts degree in 1900. He worked as a barrister in Dauphin, Manitoba, and was principal of schools in Boissevain for five years. In religion, Campbell was a Baptist. He served on the town council and school board for Dauphin.

In 1919, he married Elsie M. Thompson.

He first campaigned for the Manitoba legislature in the 1903 provincial election, and lost to Conservative candidate John Gunne by 141 votes in Dauphin. He ran again in the 1907 election, and defeated new Conservative opponent James G. Harvey by 121 votes. The Conservative Party won the election, and Campbell served as an opposition member for the next three years.

Campbell was defeated in the 1910 election, losing to Harvey by 53 votes. He sought a return to the legislature in the 1914 election, but lost to Conservative candidate Joseph Hamelin by sixty votes in the neighbouring constituency of Ste. Rose.

From 1916 to 1917, he was Commissioner for Northern Manitoba. He was elected to the House of Commons for the riding of Nelson in 1917.

In 1919, he was named King's Counsel. He served again as Commissioner for Northern Manitoba from 1921 to 1924.

Campbell died in Brandon at the age of 91.
