= James G. Harvey =

Canadian politician (1869-1950)

James Graham Harvey (June 3, 1869—November 12, 1950) was a politician in Manitoba, Canada. He served in the Legislative Assembly of Manitoba from 1910 to 1914, as a member of the Conservative Party.

Harvey was born at Fallbrook in Lanark County, Ontario, the son of James Graham Harvey, later alderman and controller for the city of Winnipeg, and Catherine Ferguson. He came to Winnipeg with his family in 1875 and was educated at public schools there and at Manitoba College, receiving a law degree. He was called to the Manitoba bar and began practising law in Winnipeg in 1890. Harvey moved to Dauphin in 1896. He served three years as mayor of Dauphin and also was president of the Dauphin Board of Trade. In religion, Harvey was a Presbyterian. He married Ida S. Mills in 1897.

He first ran for the Manitoba legislature in the 1907 election in the constituency of Dauphin, and lost to Liberal candidate John Campbell by 121 votes. He ran again in 1910, and defeated Campbell by 53 votes. The Conservatives won the election, and Harvey served as a backbench supporter of Rodmond Roblin's administration for the next four years. He did not run for re-election in the 1914 campaign.

Harvey died in Winnipeg at the age of 81.
