= Stewart McLean (politician) =

Canadian politician

Stewart Edgertson McLean (21 November 1913 – 13 April 1996) was a Manitoba politician. He served as a cabinet minister in the governments of Dufferin Roblin and Walter Weir, and unsuccessfully ran for the leadership of the Progressive Conservative Party of Manitoba in 1967.

The son of David McLean, he was born and raised in Dauphin, Manitoba, and received a B.A. and an LL.B. from the University of Saskatchewan. McLean came down with tuberculosis before he entered service in the Royal Canadian Air Force during World War II. He was called to the Manitoba bar in 1945, and served as Mayor of Dauphin from 1955 to 1958.

In 1958, McLean was elected to the Manitoba legislature for the riding of Dauphin. A Progressive Conservative, McLean was appointed Minister of Education in the minority government of Dufferin Roblin. He retained this position after Roblin's Tories won a majority government in 1959, and was responsible for overseeing the consolidation of several school boards.

On 9 December 1963, McLean was shifted to the office of Attorney-General. He held this position until 22 July 1966, when he was appointed Provincial Secretary and Minister of Public Works.

Ideologically, McLean was a representative of the Progressive Conservative Party's right wing, and had difficulty accepting some of Dufferin Roblin's more innovative policies (for instance, "shared services" for separate schools).

When Roblin moved to federal politics in 1967, McLean was one of four candidates who sought to replace him. He placed third on the first ballot with 87 votes, and was eliminated on the second after falling to 73. Most of his supporters voted for Weir, the winning candidate, on the third and final ballot.

Weir initially kept McLean as Provincial Secretary and Public Works Minister, but shifted him to the Ministry of Transportation on 24 September 1968.

Weir's Tories were defeated by Edward Schreyer's New Democrats in 1969. McLean was personally defeated in by New Democrat Peter Burtniak, after a recount, by 41 votes. He did not return to provincial politics after this.

After leaving politics, he served as a judge in Saskatchewan, retiring in 1983.

McLean died at home in Dauphin in 1996.
