= John Gunn =

John Gunn may refer to:

== Sports ==
- John Gunn (cricketer) (1876–1963), English cricketer
- John Oliver Gunn Jr. (1939–2010), American race car driver
- Salvatore Sincere (born 1966), wrestler who used the ring name Johnny Gunn
- JD Gunn (born 2000), Panamanian footballer
- John Gunn (19th-century footballer), played for Bolton Wanderers, Manchester City and Clyde, see List of Manchester City F.C. players (1–24 appearances)

== Politics ==
- J. A. W. Gunn (1937-2023), Canadian political philosopher
- John Gunn (Australian politician) (1884–1959), 29th Premier of South Australia
- John Gunn (New South Wales politician) (1860–1910), Australian politician and pastoralist
- John Gunn (Manitoba politician) (1826–1898), politician in Manitoba, Canada

== Science ==
- J. B. Gunn (1928–2008), discovered the Gunn effect and invented the Gunn diode
- John Currie Gunn (1916–2002), Scottish scientist
- John Gunn (geologist) (1801–1890), English geologist

== Writing and academia ==
- John Gunn (Australian writer) (born 1925), Australian writer, sailor and aviation journalist
- John Alexander Gunn (1896–1975), philosopher
- John Gunn (Scottish writer) (c. 1765–c. 1824), Scottish cellist, writer on music, and professor

== Religion ==
- John R. Gunn (1877–1956), American clergyman
- John Edward Gunn (1863–1924), Irish-born prelate of the Roman Catholic Church

== See also: John Gunne ==
- John Gunne (Manitoba politician) (1870–1935), Canadian politician
- John Gunne (English politician) (fl. 1397)
