= Roger Graham =

Roger Graham may refer to:

== Real people ==
- Roger A. Graham (1885–1938), music publisher, lyricist, and composer
- Roger Graham (American football) (born 1972), American football player
- Roger Phillips Graham or Rog Phillips (1909–1965), American science fiction writer
- W. Roger Graham (1919–1988), Canadian historian

== Fictional characters ==
- Roger Graham, character in the 1945 mystery film Strange Confession
- Roger Graham, character in the 1992 film Unlawful Entry
