= Archibald Esplen =

Canadian politician

Archibald Esplen (January 29, 1864 – June 12, 1933) was a politician in Manitoba, Canada. He served in the Legislative Assembly of Manitoba from 1922 to 1927, as a member of the Manitoba Liberal Party.

He was born in Port Elgin, Canada West, the son of John Esplen and Sarah McLean, and was educated in Bruce County. Esplen came to Manitoba in 1882, working as a farmhand near Minnedosa. He served in the Minnedosa company during the North-West Rebellion of 1885. Esplen received a military grant near Dauphin, where he operated his own farm. In 1887, he married Mary Carmichael. He was a member of the council for the Rural Municipality of Dauphin, also serving as reeve.

He won elected to the Manitoba legislature in the 1922 provincial election, defeating Labour incumbent George Palmer by 83 votes in the Dauphin constituency.

The Liberal Party lost this election to the United Farmers of Manitoba, and Esplen served as an opposition member of the legislature for the next five years. He was defeated in the 1927 election, finishing third against Conservative Robert Ferguson.

He died at home near Dauphin.
