= William J. Harrington =

Canadian politician

William James Harrington was a politician in Manitoba, Canada. He served in the Legislative Assembly of Manitoba from 1915 to 1920, as a member of the Liberal Party.

A resident of Dauphin, Manitoba, he was elected to the Manitoba legislature in the 1915 provincial election to represent the Dauphin constituency. He defeated Conservative incumbent William Buchanan by 102 votes. The Liberals won a landslide majority in this election, and Harrington served as a backbench supporter of Tobias Norris's government for the next five years.

He was defeated in the 1920 provincial election, losing to Labour candidate George Palmer by 422 votes.
