= George Balcan =

Canadian radio broadcaster and artist (1932–2004)

George Balcaen
- Born: George Adelaed Alfred Balcaen; June 29, 1932; Saint Boniface, Manitoba
- Died: May 4, 2004 (aged 71)
- Known for: radio broadcaster and artist
- Awards: Order of Canada

George Balcaen, CM (June 29, 1932 – May 4, 2004), born George Adelard Alfred Balcaen, was a Canadian radio broadcaster and artist.

Balcaen was one of the most recognizable voices on the airwaves of Montreal for 30 years. Born in Saint Boniface, Manitoba in 1931, Balcaen first worked as a sketch artist in the engineering department of the Canadian Pacific Railway in his native province.

Balcaen began his broadcast career in 1951, when he was the first announcer to sign on with CKDM, a radio station in his hometown of Dauphin, Manitoba. He was later discovered working at CKOC in Hamilton by H.T. "Mac" McCurdy, who brought Balcan to Montreal in 1963 to serve as the afternoon host at CJAD. He then became the station's morning man in 1967. Balcaen moved to crosstown competitor CFCF in 1973, where he also served as an on-air host for the television service. He then returned to CJAD as the morning man in 1975, where he remained until his retirement in 1998, the longest ever to hold the position in any Montreal radio station.

He became an accomplished pastel artist and was a member of the Pastel Society of Canada. His works have graced the walls of the National Gallery of Canada in Ottawa. In 1991, he and his family established the George Balcaen Bursary at Concordia University, which awards are given to Fine Arts students pursuing a major in painting and drawing. Balcaen worked tirelessly in his community in support of many causes, including the fight against breast cancer and for juvenile diabetes research.

Balcan was appointed a Member of the Order of Canada in 1996. In 2005, he was inducted into the Canadian Association of Broadcasters Hall of Fame. He died on May 4, 2004.
