= George Hastings Palmer =

Canadian politician

George Hastings Palmer (April 26, 1881 – January 16, 1947) was a Labour politician in Manitoba, Canada. He served in the Legislative Assembly of Manitoba from 1920 to 1922.

Palmer was born in Halifax, Nova Scotia, the son of George H. Palmer and Elizabeth Thompson, and was educated in Yarmouth. He was a railway employee in Halifax and later worked as a train dispatcher in Manitoba. In 1905, he married May Slocomb. Palmer was elected mayor of Dauphin in 1925.

He was elected to the Manitoba legislature in the 1920 provincial election, as a Labour candidate in the constituency of Dauphin. He defeated incumbent Liberal William J. Harrington by 422 votes. The Labour Party and its allies jumped from one seat to eleven in this election, and Palmer served with the labour group in parliament for the next two years.

He was defeated in the 1922 election, losing to Liberal Archibald Esplen by 83 votes.

Palmer attempted to return to the legislature in the 1927 provincial election. This time, he ran as Progressive supporting John Bracken's government. He finished second to Conservative Robert Ferguson.

He died in Winnipeg at the age of 65.
