= Robert Hawkins (Manitoba politician) =

Canadian politician (1879-1962)

15th Speaker of the Legislative Assembly of Manitoba
- In office February 18, 1937 – September 29, 1949
- Preceded by: Philippe Adjutor Talbot
- Succeeded by: Wallace C. Miller

Member of the Legislative Assembly of Manitoba for Dauphin
- In office June 16, 1932 – November 10, 1949
- Preceded by: Robert Ferguson
- Succeeded by: Ernest McGirr

Personal details
- Born: May 29, 1879 Buckland St. Mary, Somerset, England
- Died: June 19, 1962 (aged 83) Dauphin, Manitoba, Canada
- Party: Liberal-Progressive
- Occupation: insurance agent, real estate and financial agent

Robert Hawkins (May 29, 1879 at Buckland St. Mary, Somerset, England – June 19, 1962) was a politician in Manitoba, Canada. He served in the Legislative Assembly of Manitoba from 1932 to 1949 as a Liberal-Progressive, and was Speaker of the legislature from 1937 to 1949.

Hawkins was educated in Bristol, and came to Canada in 1904. He worked as an insurance, real estate and financial agent, serving as president of Robert Hawkins Co. Ltd.

He was first elected to the Manitoba legislature in the 1932 provincial election, defeating Conservative candidate Ernest N. McGirr, 266 votes in the Dauphin constituency. He was re-elected over McGirr by a greater margin in the 1936 election. On February 18, 1937, he was chosen as Speaker of the Assembly.

Hawkins was re-elected by acclamation in the 1941 provincial election, and defeated a candidate of the Cooperative Commonwealth Federation in 1945. He did not seek re-election in 1949.
