= Ernest McGirr =

Canadian politician (1887–1982)

Ernest N. McGirr
- Born: March 7, 1887; Emerson, Manitoba
- Died: May 23, 1982 (aged 95); Dauphin, Manitoba

Ernest Newburn McGirr, QC (March 7, 1887 – May 23, 1982) was a politician in Manitoba, Canada. He served in the Legislative Assembly of Manitoba as a Progressive Conservative from 1949 to 1953.

== Early life, marriage and family ==
Born in Emerson, Manitoba, McGirr was educated in Morden and Winnipeg. McGirr married Elizabeth Stewart, of Griswold, near Oak Lake, in 1916. They had two daughters, Nora Elizabeth McGirr Roots Clawson (1917-1989), an editor who was married and later divorced from Peter Charles Roots, the father of her three children (Stephanie Roots Karsten [1947–present], Judith Roots Carver [1950–2021], and David Henry Roots [1951–present] and then to Robert Marion Clawson; and Kathleen (who married first the Canadian historian Roger Graham and later the distinguished military man Leonard Birchall). McGirr was named a King's Counsel in 1933.

== Career ==
McGirr joined a law firm in Dauphin in 1914 and was made a partner in 1916. McGirr first ran for the Manitoba legislature as a Conservative in the 1932 provincial election, but lost to Liberal-Progressive candidate Robert Hawkins by 265 votes in the Dauphin constituency. He lost to Hawkins again, by a greater margin, in the 1936 election.

He was elected to the legislature on his third attempt, in the provincial election of 1949. The Liberal-Progressives and Progressive Conservatives had previously formed a coalition government in Manitoba, and with support from the Liberal-Progressives, McGirr easily defeated an opponent from Cooperative Commonwealth Federation to take the Dauphin constituency.

The Progressive Conservatives left the coalition government in 1950, and McGirr moved to the opposition benches with his party. He was defeated in the 1953 provincial election, placing third against William Bullmore of the Social Credit League. He acted as the Dauphin town solicitor for 50 years prior to his retirement, served on the board of United College in Winnipeg, and was a Bencher (1952–1968) and Life Bencher (1968–1982) of the Law Society of Manitoba.

== Death ==
McGirr died in Dauphin at the age of 95.
