= Stan Struthers =

Canadian politician

Minister of Municipal Government
- In office October 18, 2013 – November 3, 2014
- Premier: Greg Selinger
- Preceded by: Ron Lemieux
- Succeeded by: Drew Caldwell

Manitoba Minister of Finance
- In office October 19, 2011 – October 18, 2013
- Premier: Greg Selinger
- Preceded by: Rosann Wowchuk
- Succeeded by: Jennifer Howard

Manitoba Minister of Agriculture, Food and Rural Initiatives
- In office November 3, 2009 – January 13, 2012
- Premier: Greg Selinger
- Preceded by: Rosann Wowchuk
- Succeeded by: Ron Kostyshyn

Manitoba Minister of Conservation
- In office November 4, 2003 – November 3, 2009
- Premier: Gary Doer; Greg Selinger
- Preceded by: Steve Ashton
- Succeeded by: Bill Blaikie

Member of the Legislative Assembly of Manitoba for Dauphin Dauphin—Roblin, 1999–2011
- In office April 25, 1995 – April 19, 2016
- Preceded by: John Plohman
- Succeeded by: Brad Michaleski

Personal details
- Party: New Democratic Party of Manitoba
- Education: Brandon University (BA)(BEd); University of Manitoba (MEd)
- Occupation: Teacher, politician

Stan Struthers (born 1959) is a Manitoba politician and a former member of the Legislative Assembly of Manitoba for the New Democratic Party (NDP). He served in the legislature from his election in 1995 until his retirement in 2016, holding various cabinet positions in the governments of Gary Doer and Greg Selinger during his time in office. In February 2018, he apologized after five former colleagues brought allegations of inappropriate touching over many years.

== Background ==
Born in Swan River, Manitoba, Struthers graduated from Swan Valley Regional Secondary School in 1977, and later received his Bachelor of Arts and Bachelor of Education degrees from Brandon University, and his Master's of Education from the University of Manitoba. He went on to teach at Norway House, then became principal at Rorketon Collegiate and later taught at the Winnipegosis High School.

== Political career ==
Struthers was first elected to the Manitoba Legislature in the 1995 provincial election as the member for Dauphin. He was re-elected as the MLA for the redistributed Dauphin—Roblin riding in 1999 and 2003. In his first term, he served as the NDP's Natural Resources Critic and Deputy Agriculture Critic. After the NDP formed government, Struthers served as the legislative assistant to the Minister of Health, Dave Chomiak. Premier Gary Doer appointed Struthers as Minister of Conservation on November 4, 2003. On November 3, 2009, Premier Greg Selinger appointed Struthers as Minister of Manitoba Agriculture, Food and Rural Initiatives.

In 1995, Struthers supported Lorne Nystrom's campaign for the leadership of the federal New Democratic Party. In 2003, he supported Bill Blaikie.

He was re-elected in the 2007 and 2011 elections.

Struthers resigned his cabinet position on November 3, 2014 along with Jennifer Howard, Theresa Oswald, Erin Selby, and Andrew Swan, due to concerns about Premier Selinger's leadership. He remained an NDP MLA after resignation from cabinet. He did not seek re-election in Dauphin in the 2016 general election.

In February 2018, in association with the global Me Too movement, several women came forward with allegations that Stan Struthers sexually harassed and inappropriately touched several of his staff over many years while a member of the Legislative Assembly. During these years, Struthers' staff often referred to him as "Minister Tickles" behind his back. Party officials received at least three complaints about Struthers' tickling and harassment between 2010 and 2015 but no formal investigations took place. Struthers issued an apology for his behaviour in February 2018.
