= Brad Michaleski =

Canadian politician

Member of the Legislative Assembly of Manitoba for Dauphin
- In office April 19, 2016 – September 5, 2023
- Preceded by: Stan Struthers
- Succeeded by: Ron Kostyshyn

Personal details
- Party: Progressive Conservative

Brad Michaleski is a Canadian provincial politician, who was elected as the Member of the Legislative Assembly of Manitoba for the riding of Dauphin in the 2016 election. He is a member of the Progressive Conservative party.
