= Dauphin (provincial electoral district) =

Provincial electoral district in Manitoba, Canada

Manitoba electoral district

Provincial electoral district
- Legislature: Legislative Assembly of Manitoba
MLA
Ron Kostyshyn
New Democratic
- District created: 1881
- First contested: 1881
- Last contested: 2019

Demographics
- Population (2016): 23,290
- Electors (2019): 16,315
- Area (km²): 13,099
- Pop. density (per km²): 1.8

Dauphin is a provincial electoral district of Manitoba, Canada. It was initially created in 1881 with the expansion of the province's western boundary, eliminated in 1886, re-established in 1892, and finally abolished in 1999. Most of its territory went to the new riding of Dauphin-Roblin, though a small amount went to the riding of Swan River. Dauphin-Roblin was largely replaced by a new Dauphin riding in the 2008 redistribution, expanding to include Ste. Rose du Lac.

Dauphin was initially centred on the community of Dauphin, though it now encompasses much rural territory. It is located in the province's mid-northern region, close to the provincial border with Saskatchewan.

== Members of the Legislative Assembly ==
Assembly	Years	Member	Party
Riding created
4th	1881-1882	John A. Davidson	Liberal
5th	1882-1886	John A. Davidson	Liberal-Conservative
Riding dissolved into Beautiful Plains
Riding created from Beautiful Plains
8th	1892-1895	Theodore Arthur Burrows	Liberal-Conservative
9th	1895-1899	Theodore Arthur Burrows	Liberal
10th	1899-1903	Theodore Arthur Burrows	Liberal
11th	1903-1907	John Gunne	Conservative
12th	1907-1910	John Campbell	Liberal
13th	1910-1914	James G. Harvey	Conservative
14th	1914-1915	William Buchanan	Conservative
15th	1915-1920	William Harrington	Liberal
16th	1920	George Palmer	Dominion Labour Party
16th	1920-1922	George Palmer	Independent Labour Party
17th	1922-1927	Archibald Esplen	Liberal
18th	1927-1932	Robert Ferguson	Conservative
19th	1932-1936	Robert Hawkins	Liberal–Progressive
20th	1936-1941	Robert Hawkins	Liberal–Progressive
21st	1941-1945	Robert Hawkins	Liberal–Progressive
22nd	1945-1949	Robert Hawkins	Liberal–Progressive
23rd	1949-1953	Ernest McGirr	Progressive Conservative
24th	1953-1958	William Bullmore	Social Credit
24th	1958	William Bullmore	Independent
25th	1958-1959	Stewart McLean	Progressive Conservative
26th	1959-1963	Stewart McLean	Progressive Conservative
27th	1963-1966	Stewart McLean	Progressive Conservative
28th	1966-1969	Stewart McLean	Progressive Conservative
29th	1969-1972	Peter Burtniak	New Democratic
30th	1973-1977	Peter Burtniak	New Democratic
31st	1977-1981	James Galbraith	Progressive Conservative
32nd	1981-1985	John Plohman	New Democratic
33rd	1985-1988	John Plohman	New Democratic
34th	1988-1990	John Plohman	New Democratic
35th	1990-1995	John Plohman	New Democratic
36th	1995-1999	Stan Struthers	New Democratic
Dauphin-Roblin
37th	1999-2003	Stan Struthers	New Democratic
38th	2003-2007	Stan Struthers	New Democratic
39th	2007-2011	Stan Struthers	New Democratic
Dauphin
40th	2011-2016	Stan Struthers	New Democratic
41st	2016–2019	Brad Michaleski	Progressive Conservative
42nd	2019–2023	Brad Michaleski	Progressive Conservative
43rd	2023–Present	Ron Kostyshyn	New Democratic

== Election results ==
=== 2023 ===
2023 Manitoba general election
Party	Candidate	Votes	%	±%	Expenditures
New Democratic	Ron Kostyshyn	4,887	52.06	+9.67	$44,638.61
Progressive Conservative	Gord Wood	4,501	47.94	-2.57	$35,266.87
Total valid votes/expense limit		9,388	98.86	–	$61,663.00
Total rejected and declined ballots		108	1.14	–	
Turnout		9,496	60.30	+1.68	
Eligible voters		15,747			
New Democratic gain from Progressive Conservative		Swing		+6.12	
Source(s) Source: Elections Manitoba

=== 2019 ===
2019 Manitoba general election
Party	Candidate	Votes	%	±%	Expenditures
Progressive Conservative	Brad Michaleski	4,805	50.52	-6.3	$18,681.41
New Democratic	Darcy Scheller	4,032	42.39	+15.9	$16,318.71
Liberal	Cathy Scofield-Singh	675	7.10	-0.7	$1,433.16
Total valid votes		9,512	99.46	–	
Rejected		52	0.54		
Turnout		9,564	58.62		
Eligible voters		16,315			
Progressive Conservative hold		Swing		-11.1	
Source(s) Source: Manitoba. Chief Electoral Officer (2019). Statement of Votes for the 42nd Provincial General Election, September 10, 2019 (PDF) (Report). Winnipeg: Elections Manitoba. "Candidate Election Returns". Elections Manitoba. Elections Manitoba.

=== 2016 ===
2016 provincial election redistributed results
Party	%
Progressive Conservative	56.8
New Democratic	26.5
Liberal	7.8
Green	6.7
Others	2.3

2016 Manitoba general election
Party	Candidate	Votes	%	±%	Expenditures
Progressive Conservative	Brad Michaleski	4,795	60.22	19.11	$40,261.43
New Democratic	Darcy Scheller	1,899	23.85	-31.07	$27,668.94
Green	Kate Storey	595	7.47	5.03	$10.00
Liberal	Garry Gurke	505	6.34	4.82	$10,170.71
Manitoba	Darrell Inkster	168	2.11	–	$1,727.88
Total valid votes		7,962	–	–	
Rejected		64	–		
Eligible voters / turnout		12,976	61.85	-0.24	
Source(s) Source: Manitoba. Chief Electoral Officer (2016). Statement of Votes for the 41st Provincial General Election, April 19, 2016 (PDF) (Report). Winnipeg: Elections Manitoba. "Election Returns: 41st General Election". Elections Manitoba. 2016.

=== 2011 ===
2011 Manitoba general election
Party	Candidate	Votes	%	±%	Expenditures
New Democratic	Stan Struthers	4,483	54.93	1.28	$33,296.00
Progressive Conservative	Lloyd J. McKinney	3,356	41.12	-0.34	$24,113.55
Green	Tamela Friesen	199	2.44	–	$936.70
Liberal	Sisay Tessema	124	1.52	-3.38	$0.00
Total valid votes		8,162	–	–	
Rejected		22	–		
Eligible voters / turnout		13,181	62.09	–	
Source(s) Source: Manitoba. Chief Electoral Officer (2011). Statement of Votes for the 40th Provincial General Election, October 4, 2011 (PDF) (Report). Winnipeg: Elections Manitoba. "Election Returns: 40th General Election". Elections Manitoba. 2011.

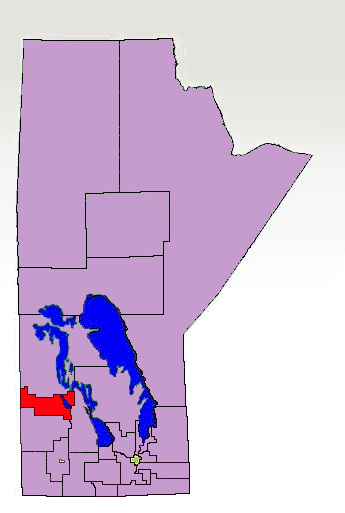
The 1998–2011 boundaries for Dauphin-Roblin highlighted in red

=== 2007 ===
2007 Manitoba general election: Dauphin—Roblin
Party	Candidate	Votes	%	±%	Expenditures
New Democratic	Stan Struthers	4,214	53.64	-0.63	$18.341.99
Progressive Conservative	Lloyd McKinney	3,257	41.46	6.33	$13,909.20
Liberal	Yarko Petryshyn	385	4.90	-3.15	$340.29
Total valid votes		7,856	–	–	
Rejected		21	–	–	
Eligible voters / turnout		13,021	60.49	–	
Source(s) Source: Manitoba. Chief Electoral Officer (2007). Statement of Votes for the 39th Provincial General Election, May 22, 2007 (PDF) (Report). Winnipeg: Elections Manitoba.

=== 2003 ===
2003 Manitoba general election: Dauphin—Roblin
Party	Candidate	Votes	%	±%	Expenditures
New Democratic	Stan Struthers	4,602	54.27	-1.40	$19,591.59
Progressive Conservative	Bill Griffin	2,979	35.13	-4.67	$21,020.48
Liberal	Joelle Robinson	683	8.05	–	$5,877.85
Green	Larry Powell	216	2.55	–	$84.49
Total valid votes		8,480	–	–	
Rejected		29	–		
Eligible voters / turnout		13,675	62.22	–	
Source(s) Source: Manitoba. Chief Electoral Officer (2003). Statement of Votes for the 38th Provincial General Election, June 3, 2003 (PDF) (Report). Winnipeg: Elections Manitoba.

=== 1999 ===
1999 Manitoba general election: Dauphin—Roblin
Party	Candidate	Votes	%	±%	Expenditures
New Democratic	Stan Struthers	5,596	55.67	7.30	$27,418.00
Progressive Conservative	Lorne Boguski	4,001	39.80	-0.36	$31,178.48
Manitoba	Doug McPhee	455	4.53	–	$2,427.16
Total valid votes		10,052	–	–	
Rejected		42	–		
Eligible voters / turnout		13,916	72.54	–	
Source(s) Source: Manitoba. Chief Electoral Officer (1999). Statement of Votes for the 37th Provincial General Election, September 21, 1999 (PDF) (Report). Winnipeg: Elections Manitoba.

=== 1995 ===
1995 Manitoba general election
Party	Candidate	Votes	%	±%
New Democratic	Stan Struthers	4,673	48.37	-0.46
Progressive Conservative	Gord Ryz	3,880	40.17	5.35
Liberal	Ranjit Sarin	996	10.31	-6.04
Independent	Carey Contois	111	1.15	–
Total valid votes		9,660	–	–
Rejected		34	–	
Eligible voters / Turnout		12,460	77.80	1.13
Source(s) Source: Manitoba. Chief Electoral Officer (1999). Statement of Votes for the 37th Provincial General Election, September 21, 1999 (PDF) (Report). Winnipeg: Elections Manitoba.

=== 1990 ===
1990 Manitoba general election
Party	Candidate	Votes	%	±%
New Democratic	John Plohman	4,802	48.83	8.57
Progressive Conservative	Martin Bidzinski	3,424	34.82	0.10
Liberal	Peter Rampton	1,608	16.35	-8.67
Total valid votes		9,834	–	–
Rejected		23	–	
Eligible voters / Turnout		12,856	76.67	-7.06
Source(s) Source: Manitoba. Chief Electoral Officer (1999). Statement of Votes for the 37th Provincial General Election, September 21, 1999 (PDF) (Report). Winnipeg: Elections Manitoba.

=== 1988 ===
1988 Manitoba general election
Party	Candidate	Votes	%	±%
New Democratic	John Plohman	3,983	40.26	-12.01
Progressive Conservative	Russell Secord	3,435	34.72	1.33
Liberal	Peter Rampton	2,475	25.02	10.67
Total valid votes		9,893	–	–
Rejected		25	–	
Eligible voters / Turnout		11,845	83.73	5.03
Source(s) Source: Manitoba. Chief Electoral Officer (1999). Statement of Votes for the 37th Provincial General Election, September 21, 1999 (PDF) (Report). Winnipeg: Elections Manitoba.

=== 1986 ===
1986 Manitoba general election
Party	Candidate	Votes	%	±%
New Democratic	John Plohman	4,886	52.27	4.38
Progressive Conservative	Erv Tycholis	3,121	33.39	-7.99
Liberal	Peter Rampton	1,341	14.35	3.61
Total valid votes		9,348	–	–
Rejected		21	–	
Eligible voters / Turnout		11,904	78.70	-5.51
Source(s) Source: Manitoba. Chief Electoral Officer (1999). Statement of Votes for the 37th Provincial General Election, September 21, 1999 (PDF) (Report). Winnipeg: Elections Manitoba.

=== 1981 ===
1981 Manitoba general election
Party	Candidate	Votes	%	±%
New Democratic	John Plohman	4,680	47.89	-0.66
Progressive Conservative	James Galbraith	4,044	41.38	-10.08
Liberal	Bob Hawkins	1,049	10.73	–
Total valid votes		9,773	–	–
Rejected		19	–	
Eligible voters / Turnout		11,627	84.22	-1.26
Source(s) Source: Manitoba. Chief Electoral Officer (1999). Statement of Votes for the 37th Provincial General Election, September 21, 1999 (PDF) (Report). Winnipeg: Elections Manitoba.

=== 1977 ===
1977 Manitoba general election
Party	Candidate	Votes	%	±%
Progressive Conservative	James Galbraith	4,590	51.46	13.59
New Democratic	Peter Burtniak	4,330	48.54	-0.92
Total valid votes		8,920	–	–
Rejected		69	–	
Eligible voters / Turnout		10,516	85.48	3.43
Source(s) Source: Manitoba. Chief Electoral Officer (1999). Statement of Votes for the 37th Provincial General Election, September 21, 1999 (PDF) (Report). Winnipeg: Elections Manitoba.

=== 1973 ===
1973 Manitoba general election
Party	Candidate	Votes	%	±%
New Democratic	Peter Burtniak	4,261	49.47	3.96
Progressive Conservative	Arthur Vincent "Art" Rampton	3,262	37.87	-7.00
Liberal	Hugh Dunlop	1,091	12.67	3.05
Total valid votes		8,614	–	–
Rejected		47	–	
Eligible voters / Turnout		10,556	82.05	12.06
Source(s) Source: Manitoba. Chief Electoral Officer (1999). Statement of Votes for the 37th Provincial General Election, September 21, 1999 (PDF) (Report). Winnipeg: Elections Manitoba.

=== 1969 ===
1969 Manitoba general election
Party	Candidate	Votes	%	±%
New Democratic	Peter Burtniak	2,933	45.51	40.69
Progressive Conservative	Stewart McLean	2,892	44.87	-19.43
Liberal	Robert E. Sheldon	620	9.62	-21.26
Total valid votes		6,445	–	–
Rejected		44	–	
Eligible voters / Turnout		9,271	69.99	3.69
Source(s) Source: Manitoba. Chief Electoral Officer (1999). Statement of Votes for the 37th Provincial General Election, September 21, 1999 (PDF) (Report). Winnipeg: Elections Manitoba.

=== 1966 ===
1966 Manitoba general election
Party	Candidate	Votes	%	±%
Progressive Conservative	Stewart McLean	3,149	64.30	-0.02
Liberal	Edward Demkiw	1,512	30.88	-4.80
New Democratic	Michael J. Sotas	236	4.82	–
Total valid votes		4,897	–	–
Rejected		29	–	
Eligible voters / Turnout		7,430	66.30	-2.50
Source(s) Source: Manitoba. Chief Electoral Officer (1999). Statement of Votes for the 37th Provincial General Election, September 21, 1999 (PDF) (Report). Winnipeg: Elections Manitoba.

=== 1962 ===
1962 Manitoba general election
Party	Candidate	Votes	%	±%
Progressive Conservative	Stewart McLean	3,247	64.32	7.03
Liberal	John Seale	1,801	35.68	–
Total valid votes		5,048	–	–
Rejected		44	–	
Eligible voters / Turnout		7,401	68.80	-5.09
Source(s) Source: Manitoba. Chief Electoral Officer (1999). Statement of Votes for the 37th Provincial General Election, September 21, 1999 (PDF) (Report). Winnipeg: Elections Manitoba.

=== 1959 ===
1959 Manitoba general election
Party	Candidate	Votes	%	±%
Progressive Conservative	Stewart McLean	2,951	57.29	4.56
Co-operative Commonwealth	A. Clifford Matthews	1,233	23.94	3.40
Liberal–Progressive	Emma Hildegard Ringstrom	967	18.77	-7.96
Total valid votes		5,151	–	–
Rejected		67	–	
Eligible voters / Turnout		7,062	73.89	0.10
Source(s) Source: Manitoba. Chief Electoral Officer (1999). Statement of Votes for the 37th Provincial General Election, September 21, 1999 (PDF) (Report). Winnipeg: Elections Manitoba.

=== 1958 ===
1958 Manitoba general election
Party	Candidate	Votes	%	±%
Progressive Conservative	Stewart McLean	2,740	52.73	29.97
Liberal–Progressive	John Potoski	1,389	26.73	-5.23
Co-operative Commonwealth	A. C. Matthews	1,067	20.54	19.18
Total valid votes		5,196	–	–
Rejected		30	–	
Eligible voters / Turnout		7,082	73.79	-12.13
Source(s) Source: Manitoba. Chief Electoral Officer (1999). Statement of Votes for the 37th Provincial General Election, September 21, 1999 (PDF) (Report). Winnipeg: Elections Manitoba.

=== 1953 ===
1953 Manitoba general election
Party	Candidate	Votes	%	±%
Social Credit	William Bullmore	2,534	43.92	–
Liberal–Progressive	John Potoski	1,844	31.96	–
Progressive Conservative	Ernest McGirr	1,313	22.76	-49.32
Co-operative Commonwealth	Frank Fullbrook	78	1.35	-26.57
Total valid votes		5,769	–	–
Rejected		205	–	
Eligible voters / Turnout		6,953	85.92	24.46
Source(s) Source: Manitoba. Chief Electoral Officer (1999). Statement of Votes for the 37th Provincial General Election, September 21, 1999 (PDF) (Report). Winnipeg: Elections Manitoba.

=== 1949 ===
1949 Manitoba general election
Party	Candidate	Votes	%	±%
Progressive Conservative	Ernest McGirr	2,855	72.08	–
Co-operative Commonwealth	George J. Jackman	1,106	27.92	-7.66
Total valid votes		3,961	–	–
Rejected		80	–	
Eligible voters / Turnout		6,575	61.46	-3.27
Source(s) Source: Manitoba. Chief Electoral Officer (1999). Statement of Votes for the 37th Provincial General Election, September 21, 1999 (PDF) (Report). Winnipeg: Elections Manitoba.

=== 1945 ===
1945 Manitoba general election
Party	Candidate	Votes	%	±%
Liberal–Progressive	Robert Hawkins	2,312	64.42	–
Co-operative Commonwealth	Maurice Wesley "Moe" Cryderman	1,277	35.58	–
Total valid votes		3,589	–	–
Rejected		26	–	
Eligible voters / Turnout		5,585	64.73	64.73
Source(s) Source: Manitoba. Chief Electoral Officer (1999). Statement of Votes for the 37th Provincial General Election, September 21, 1999 (PDF) (Report). Winnipeg: Elections Manitoba.

=== 1941 ===
1941 Manitoba general election
Party	Candidate	Votes	%	±%
Liberal–Progressive	Robert Hawkins		0.00	-45.52
Total valid votes			–	–
Rejected		N/A	–	
Eligible voters / Turnout		5,452	0.00	-79.57
Source(s) Source: Manitoba. Chief Electoral Officer (1999). Statement of Votes for the 37th Provincial General Election, September 21, 1999 (PDF) (Report). Winnipeg: Elections Manitoba.

=== 1936 ===
1936 Manitoba general election
Party	Candidate	Votes	%	±%
Liberal–Progressive	Robert Hawkins	1,836	45.52	-0.61
Conservative	Ernest McGirr	1,312	32.53	-7.01
Independent Labour	Ronald Moore	885	21.94	–
Total valid votes		4,033	–	–
Rejected		134	–	
Eligible voters / Turnout		5,237	79.57	-4.35
Source(s) Source: Manitoba. Chief Electoral Officer (1999). Statement of Votes for the 37th Provincial General Election, September 21, 1999 (PDF) (Report). Winnipeg: Elections Manitoba.

=== 1932 ===
1932 Manitoba general election
Party	Candidate	Votes	%	±%
Liberal–Progressive	Robert Hawkins	1,861	46.13	–
Conservative	Ernest McGirr	1,595	39.54	-4.56
Independent	W. J. Wickes	578	14.33	–
Total valid votes		4,034	–	–
Rejected		N/A	–	
Eligible voters / Turnout		4,807	83.92	1.83
Source(s) Source: Manitoba. Chief Electoral Officer (1999). Statement of Votes for the 37th Provincial General Election, September 21, 1999 (PDF) (Report). Winnipeg: Elections Manitoba.

=== 1927 ===
1927 Manitoba general election
Party	Candidate	Votes	%	±%
Conservative	Robert Ferguson	1,350	44.10	–
Progressive	George Hastings Palmer	1,064	34.76	–
Liberal	Archibald Esplen	647	21.14	-15.94
Total valid votes		3,061	–	–
Rejected		N/A	–	
Eligible voters / Turnout		3,729	82.09	13.29
Source(s) Source: Manitoba. Chief Electoral Officer (1999). Statement of Votes for the 37th Provincial General Election, September 21, 1999 (PDF) (Report). Winnipeg: Elections Manitoba.

=== 1922 ===
1922 Manitoba general election
Party	Candidate	Votes	%	±%
Liberal	Archibald Esplen	825	37.08	-4.51
Labour	George Hastings Palmer	742	33.35	-25.06
United Farmers	Henry Pears Nicholson	658	29.57	–
Total valid votes		2,225	–	–
Rejected		N/A	–	
Eligible voters / Turnout		3,234	68.80	2.22
Source(s) Source: Manitoba. Chief Electoral Officer (1999). Statement of Votes for the 37th Provincial General Election, September 21, 1999 (PDF) (Report). Winnipeg: Elections Manitoba.

=== 1920 ===
1920 Manitoba general election
Party	Candidate	Votes	%	±%
Labour	George Hastings Palmer	1,466	58.41	–
Liberal	William J. Harrington	1,044	41.59	-4.34
Total valid votes		2,510	–	–
Rejected		N/A	–	
Eligible voters / Turnout		3,770	66.58	-9.68
Source(s) Source: Manitoba. Chief Electoral Officer (1999). Statement of Votes for the 37th Provincial General Election, September 21, 1999 (PDF) (Report). Winnipeg: Elections Manitoba.

=== 1915 ===
1915 Manitoba general election
Party	Candidate	Votes	%	±%
Liberal	William J. Harrington	739	45.93	5.03
Conservative	William Buchanan	637	39.59	-19.51
Independent	James M. McQuay	233	14.48	–
Total valid votes		1,609	–	–
Rejected		N/A	–	
Eligible voters / Turnout		2,110	76.26	-6.57
Source(s) Source: Manitoba. Chief Electoral Officer (1999). Statement of Votes for the 37th Provincial General Election, September 21, 1999 (PDF) (Report). Winnipeg: Elections Manitoba.

=== 1914 ===
1914 Manitoba general election
Party	Candidate	Votes	%	±%
Conservative	William Buchanan	1,026	59.10	7.88
Liberal	John Seale	710	40.90	-7.88
Total valid votes		1,736	–	–
Rejected		N/A	–	
Eligible voters / Turnout		2,096	82.82	1.03
Source(s) Source: Manitoba. Chief Electoral Officer (1999). Statement of Votes for the 37th Provincial General Election, September 21, 1999 (PDF) (Report). Winnipeg: Elections Manitoba.

=== 1910 ===
1910 Manitoba general election
Party	Candidate	Votes	%	±%
Conservative	James G. Harvey	1,107	51.23	5.16
Liberal	John A. Campbell	1,054	48.77	-5.16
Total valid votes		2,161	–	–
Rejected		N/A	–	
Eligible voters / Turnout		2,642	81.79	6.09
Source(s) Source: Manitoba. Chief Electoral Officer (1999). Statement of Votes for the 37th Provincial General Election, September 21, 1999 (PDF) (Report). Winnipeg: Elections Manitoba.

=== 1907 ===
1907 Manitoba general election
Party	Candidate	Votes	%	±%
Liberal	John A. Campbell	830	53.93	8.78
Conservative	James G. Harvey	709	46.07	-8.78
Total valid votes		1,539	–	–
Rejected		N/A	–	
Eligible voters / Turnout		2,033	75.70	-9.67
Source(s) Source: Manitoba. Chief Electoral Officer (1999). Statement of Votes for the 37th Provincial General Election, September 21, 1999 (PDF) (Report). Winnipeg: Elections Manitoba.

=== 1903 ===
1903 Manitoba general election
Party	Candidate	Votes	%	±%
Conservative	John Gunne	797	54.85	15.55
Liberal	John A. Campbell	656	45.15	-15.55
Total valid votes		1,453	–	–
Rejected		N/A	–	
Eligible voters / Turnout		1,702	85.37	27.21
Source(s) Source: Manitoba. Chief Electoral Officer (1999). Statement of Votes for the 37th Provincial General Election, September 21, 1999 (PDF) (Report). Winnipeg: Elections Manitoba.

=== 1899 ===
1899 Manitoba general election
Party	Candidate	Votes	%	±%
Liberal	Theodore Arthur Burrows	1,203	60.70	10.18
Conservative	Robert Hunt	779	39.30	-10.18
Total valid votes		1,982	–	–
Rejected		N/A	–	
Eligible voters / Turnout		3,408	58.16	-17.26
Source(s) Source: Manitoba. Chief Electoral Officer (1999). Statement of Votes for the 37th Provincial General Election, September 21, 1999 (PDF) (Report). Winnipeg: Elections Manitoba.

=== 1896 ===
1896 Manitoba general election
Party	Candidate	Votes	%	±%
Liberal	Theodore Arthur Burrows	589	50.51	–
Conservative	Glenlyon Campbell	577	49.49	0.21
Total valid votes		1,166	–	–
Rejected		N/A	–	
Eligible voters / Turnout		1,546	75.42	2.49
Source(s) Source: Manitoba. Chief Electoral Officer (1999). Statement of Votes for the 37th Provincial General Election, September 21, 1999 (PDF) (Report). Winnipeg: Elections Manitoba.

=== 1892 ===
1892 Manitoba general election
Party	Candidate	Votes	%	±%
Liberal–Conservative	Theodore Arthur Burrows	317	50.72	–
Conservative	Glenlyon Campbell	308	49.28	–
Total valid votes		625	–	–
Rejected		N/A	–	
Eligible voters / Turnout		857	72.93	–
Source(s) Source: Manitoba. Chief Electoral Officer (1999). Statement of Votes for the 37th Provincial General Election, September 21, 1999 (PDF) (Report). Winnipeg: Elections Manitoba.

=== 1883 ===
1883 Manitoba general election
Party	Candidate	Votes	%	±%
Conservative	John Andrew Davidson		0.00	-60.41
Total valid votes			–	–
Rejected		N/A	–	
Eligible voters / Turnout		N/A	–	–
Source(s) Source: Manitoba. Chief Electoral Officer (1999). Statement of Votes for the 37th Provincial General Election, September 21, 1999 (PDF) (Report). Winnipeg: Elections Manitoba.

=== 1881 by-election ===
Manitoba provincial by-election, 1881
Party	Candidate	Votes	%
Conservative	John Andrew Davidson	148	60.41
Unknown	P. St. Clair	97	39.59
Total valid votes		245	–
Rejected		N/A	–
Eligible voters / Turnout		N/A	–
Source(s) Source: Manitoba. Chief Electoral Officer (1999). Statement of Votes for the 37th Provincial General Election, September 21, 1999 (PDF) (Report). Winnipeg: Elections Manitoba.

== See also ==
- List of Manitoba provincial electoral districts
- Canadian provincial electoral districts
