= William Buchanan (Manitoba politician) =

Canadian politician

William Buchanan (June 17, 1865 – August 11, 1944) was a politician in Manitoba, Canada. He served in the Legislative Assembly of Manitoba from 1914 to 1915, as a member of the Conservative Party.

Buchanan was born at County Tyrone, Ireland. He came to Canada in 1872, was educated at common schools, and worked as a farmer. In religion, he was a member of the Church of England.

He was elected to the Manitoba legislature in the 1914 provincial election, defeating Liberal candidate John Seale by 316 votes in the Dauphin constituency. The Conservatives won a majority government, and Buchanan sat as backbench supporter of Rodmond Roblin's administration.

In 1915, the Roblin ministry was forced to resign amid a serious corruption scandal. A new election was called, which the Liberals won in a landslide. Buchanan lost his constituency seat to Liberal William Harrington by 102 votes.
