= James Galbraith (Canadian politician) =

Canadian politician

James Gordon "Jim" Galbraith (born February 23, 1940 in Dauphin, Manitoba) is a politician in Manitoba. He was a Progressive Conservative member of the Legislative Assembly of Manitoba from 1977 to 1981 for the riding of Dauphin.

The son of Robert Brown Galbraith and Kathleen Ruth Barrett, he was raised in Ashville, Manitoba, and educated at the University of Manitoba. He worked as a customs operator and farmer before entering politics, and was for fifteen years a board member of the United Grain Growers. He also an active member of the local Anglican Church, masonic and Progressive Conservative organizations. In 1969, he married Dolores Ruth Perchaluk.

He was elected to the Manitoba legislature in the provincial election of 1977, defeating New Democrat incumbent Peter Burtniak by 260 votes in the riding of Dauphin. This result was widely regarded as an upset. Galbraith was not appointed to the cabinet of Sterling Lyon. In the 1981 election, he lost to New Democrat John Plohman by 636 votes and left political life.
