= Gunnes =

Gunnes is a surname. Notable people with the surname include:

- Erik Gunnes (1924–1999), Norwegian historian
- Jon Gunnes (born 1956), Norwegian politician

== See also ==
- Gunne
- Gunness
  - Belle Gunness, Norwegian-American serial killer
