= Minister for Manitoba Public Insurance Corporation Act =

The Minister charged with the administration of The Manitoba Public Insurance Corporation Act is a minister in the Executive Council of Manitoba, Canada, appointed by the Lieutenant Governor in Council pursuant to the Act. The chairman of the corporation reports to the appointed minister. The position is not a full portfolio, and all ministers who have held the position have also held other cabinet responsibilities.

== List of ministers charged with the administration of The Manitoba Public Insurance Corporation Act ==
Name	Party	Took office	Left office
Bill Uruski	New Democratic	August 29, 1973	September 22, 1976
Peter Burtniak	New Democratic	September 22, 1976	October 24, 1977
Harry Enns	Progressive Conservative	October 24, 1977	October 20, 1978
Harry Enns	Progressive Conservative	November 15, 1979	January 16, 1981
Warner Jorgenson	Progressive Conservative	January 16, 1981	November 30, 1981
Bill Uruski	New Democratic	November 30, 1981	August 20, 1982
John Bucklaschuk	New Democratic	August 20, 1982	September 21, 1987
Bill Uruski	New Democratic	September 21, 1987	May 9, 1988
Glen Cummings	Progressive Conservative	May 9, 1988	January 6, 1997
James McCrae	Progressive Conservative	January 6, 1997	February 5, 1999
Linda McIntosh	Progressive Conservative	February 5, 1999	October 5, 1999
Becky Barrett	New Democratic	October 5, 1999	January 17, 2001
Gord Mackintosh	New Democratic	January 17, 2001	September 21, 2006
David Chomiak	New Democratic	September 21, 2006	November 3, 2009
Andrew Swan	New Democratic	November 3, 2009	November 3, 2014
James Allum	New Democratic	November 3, 2014	April 29, 2015
Gord Mackintosh	New Democratic	April 29, 2015	May 3, 2016
Ron Schuler	Progressive Conservative	May 3, 2016	August 17, 2017
Cliff Cullen	Progressive Conservative	August 17, 2017	August 1, 2018
Colleen Mayer	Progressive Conservative	August 1, 2018	September 25, 2019
Jeff Wharton	Progressive Conservative	September 25, 2019	January 18, 2022
Kelvin Goertzen	Progressive Conservative	January 18, 2022	October 18, 2023
Matt Wiebe	New Democratic	October 18, 2023	Present

Sources: ,
