= Vehicle registration plates of Manitoba =

Manitoba
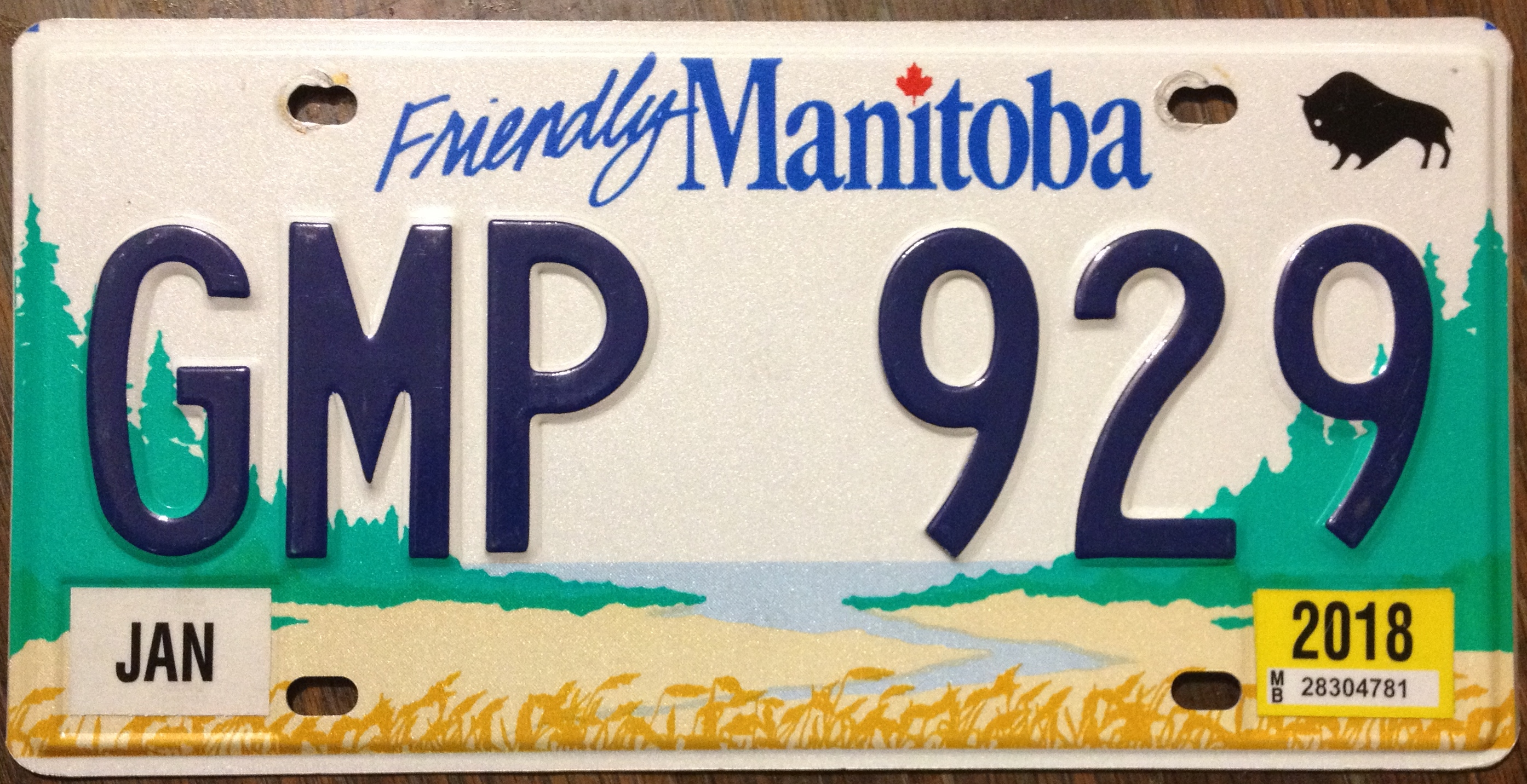

Current series
- Slogan: Friendly Manitoba
- Size: 12 in × 6 in 30 cm × 15 cm
- Material: Aluminum
- Serial format: ABC 123
- Introduced: 2012

Availability
- Issued by: Manitoba Public Insurance

History
- First issued: 1911

The Canadian province of Manitoba first required its residents to register their motor vehicles and display licence plates in 1911. As of 2026, plates are issued by Manitoba Public Insurance. Front and rear plates are required for most classes of vehicles, while only rear plates are required for motorcycles and trailers.

== Passenger baseplates ==
=== 1911 to 1947 ===
In 1956, Canada, the United States, and Mexico came to an agreement with the American Association of Motor Vehicle Administrators, the Automobile Manufacturers Association and the National Safety Council that standardized the size for licence plates for vehicles (except those for motorcycles) at 6 inches (15 cm) in height by 12 inches (30 cm) in width, with standardized mounting holes. The first Manitoba licence plate that complied with these standards was issued 25 years beforehand, in 1931.

No slogans were used on passenger plates during the period covered by this subsection.

Image	Dates issued	Design	Serial format	Serials issued	Notes
	1911	White serial on blue porcelain plate; vertical "MAN" and "1911" at left and right respectively	1234	1 to 1999; 3000 to approximately 3200	Serials 2000 through 2999 reserved for dealers.
	1912	White serial on black porcelain plate; provincial shield at left with "MAN. 1912" below	1234	1 to approximately 4500	
	1913	Black serial on white porcelain plate; provincial shield at left with "MAN 1913" below	1234	1 to approximately 5800	
	1914	Black serial on golden yellow porcelain plate; provincial shield at left with "MAN 1914" below	1234	1 to approximately 7400	
	1915	Black serial on white flat metal plate; provincial shield at left with "MAN. 1915" below	1234	1 to approximately 8900	
	1916	White serial on brown flat metal plate; provincial shield at left with "MAN. 1916" below	12345	1 to approximately 12500	
	1917	White serial on black flat metal plate; provincial shield at left with "MAN. 1917" below	12345	1 to approximately 18600	
	1918–19	Black serial on yellow flat metal plate; provincial shield at left with "MAN. 1918" below	12345	1 to approximately 33000	Revalidated for 1919 with dark green tabs.
	1920	Embossed black serial on light green plate with border line; "MAN 1920" at left	12345	1 to approximately 33500	First embossed plate.
	1921	Embossed gray serial on dark blue plate with border line; "MAN 1921" at left	12-345	1 to approximately 37-500	
	1922	Embossed white serial on black plate with border line; "MAN 1922" at left	12-345	1 to approximately 38-500	
	1923	Embossed blue serial on gray plate with border line; "MAN 1923" at left	12-345	1 to approximately 41-000	
	1924	Embossed white serial on black plate with border line; "MAN 1924" at left	12-345	1 to approximately 42-500	
	1925	Embossed black serial on white plate with border line; "MAN 1925" at left	12-345	1 to approximately 41-500	
	1926	Embossed white serial on black plate with border line; slanted "MAN" and "26" at right	12-345	1 to approximately 51-500	
	1927	Embossed black serial on white plate with border line; "MANITOBA 27" at bottom	12-345	1 to approximately 58-500	First use of the full province name.
	1928	Embossed black serial on turquoise plate with border line; "MANITOBA 28" at bottom	12-345	1 to approximately 59-000	
	1929	Embossed white serial on green plate with border line; "MANITOBA 29" at bottom	12-345	1 to approximately 77-000	
	1930	Embossed white serial on blue plate with border line; "MANITOBA 30" at bottom	12-345	1 to approximately 80-000	
	1931	Embossed white serial on green plate with border line; "MANITOBA 31" at bottom	12-345	1 to approximately 90-000	First 6" x 12" plate.
	1932	Embossed white serial on black plate with border line; "MANITOBA 32" at bottom	12-345	1 to approximately 78-000	
	1933	Embossed white serial on blue plate with border line; "MANITOBA 33" at bottom	12-345	1 to approximately 65-000	
	1934	Embossed white serial on green plate with border line; "34 MANITOBA" at bottom	12-345	1 to approximately 65-500	
	1935	Embossed white serial on black plate with border line; "MANITOBA 35" at bottom	12-345	1 to approximately 64-500	
	1936	Embossed white serial on blue plate with border line; "MANITOBA 36" at bottom	12-345	1 to approximately 65-500	
	1937	Embossed white serial on green plate with border line; "MANITOBA 37" at top	12-345	1 to approximately 68-000	
	1938	Embossed white serial on black plate with border line; "MANITOBA 38" at bottom	12-345	1 to approximately 78-500	
	1939	Embossed white serial on blue plate with border line; "MANITOBA 39" at top	12-345	1 to approximately 85-500	
	1940	Embossed white serial on green plate with border line; "MANITOBA 40" at bottom	12-345	1 to approximately 84-500	
	1941	Embossed black serial on yellow plate with border line; "MANITOBA 41" at top	12-345	1 to approximately 85-000	
	1942–44	Embossed black serial on silver plate with border line; "MANITOBA 42" at bottom	12-345	1 to approximately 84-000	Revalidated for 1943 with red tabs, and for 1944 with windshield stickers, due to metal conservation for World War II.
	1945	Embossed black serial on orange plate with border line; "MANITOBA 45" at bottom	12-345	1 to approximately 84-500	
	1946	Embossed blue serial on cream plate with border line; "MANITOBA 46" at bottom	12-345	1 to approximately 84-000	
	1947	Embossed black serial on silver plate with border line; "MANITOBA 47" at bottom	12-345	1 to approximately 85-500	

=== 1948 to present ===
Manitoba is currently one of five provinces where decals are not used to show that the vehicle has valid registration.

Image	Dates issued	Design	Slogan	Serial format	Serials issued	Notes
	1948–49	Embossed black serial on yellow plate with border line; "MANITOBA 48" at bottom	none	123-456	1 to approximately 112-000	Revalidated for 1949 with silver tabs.
	1950–51	Embossed black serial on silver plate with border line; "MANITOBA 50" at bottom	none	1A234	1A1 to approximately 9S999	Revalidated for 1951 with red tabs.
	1952–57	Embossed black serial on yellow plate with border line; "MANITOBA 52" at bottom	none	1A234	1A1 to 9Y999	Revalidated for 1953 with black tabs, for 1954 with green tabs, for 1955 with white tabs, for 1956 with black tabs, and for 1957 with green tabs.
	1952–57	Embossed black serial on yellow plate with border line; "MANITOBA 52" at bottom	none	12A34	10A1 to approximately 70P99	Revalidated for 1953 with black tabs, for 1954 with green tabs, for 1955 with white tabs, for 1956 with black tabs, and for 1957 with green tabs.
	1958–63	Embossed yellow serial on black plate with border line; "MANITOBA 58" at bottom, offset to right, with embossed bison graphic to left	none	1A234	1A1 to 9Y999	Revalidated for 1959 with white tabs, for 1960 with yellow tabs, for 1961 with green tabs, for 1962 with white tabs, and for 1963 with yellow tabs. Letters I, O, Q, R and Z not used in serials; this practice continued until 1976.
	1958–63	Embossed yellow serial on black plate with border line; "MANITOBA 58" at bottom, offset to right, with embossed bison graphic to left	none	12A34	10A1 to 99Y99	Revalidated for 1959 with white tabs, for 1960 with yellow tabs, for 1961 with green tabs, for 1962 with white tabs, and for 1963 with yellow tabs. Letters I, O, Q, R and Z not used in serials; this practice continued until 1976.
	1958–63	Embossed yellow serial on black plate with border line; "MANITOBA 58" at bottom, offset to right, with embossed bison graphic to left	none	AB123	AA1 to approximately DV999	Revalidated for 1959 with white tabs, for 1960 with yellow tabs, for 1961 with green tabs, for 1962 with white tabs, and for 1963 with yellow tabs. Letters I, O, Q, R and Z not used in serials; this practice continued until 1976.
	1964–70	Embossed black serial on yellow plate with border line; "MANITOBA 64" at bottom, offset to right, with embossed bison graphic to left	none	1A234	1A1 to 9Y999	Revalidated for 1965 with black tabs, for 1966 with red tabs, for 1967 with purple tabs, for 1968 with green tabs, for 1969 with black tabs, and for 1970 with purple tabs. Manitoba was thus the last jurisdiction in North America to revalidate its licence plates with tabs.
	1964–70	Embossed black serial on yellow plate with border line; "MANITOBA 64" at bottom, offset to right, with embossed bison graphic to left	none	12A34	10A1 to 99Y99	Revalidated for 1965 with black tabs, for 1966 with red tabs, for 1967 with purple tabs, for 1968 with green tabs, for 1969 with black tabs, and for 1970 with purple tabs. Manitoba was thus the last jurisdiction in North America to revalidate its licence plates with tabs.
	1964–70	Embossed black serial on yellow plate with border line; "MANITOBA 64" at bottom, offset to right, with embossed bison graphic to left	none	AB123	AA1 to approximately PJ999	Revalidated for 1965 with black tabs, for 1966 with red tabs, for 1967 with purple tabs, for 1968 with green tabs, for 1969 with black tabs, and for 1970 with purple tabs. Manitoba was thus the last jurisdiction in North America to revalidate its licence plates with tabs.
	1971–75	Embossed black serial on reflective white plate with border line; outline of bison's head and front leg embossed at left; "71" at bottom left	"SUNNY MANITOBA" and "100,000 LAKES" centred at top and bottom respectively	AB-123; AB12-34	AA-1 to approximately DW99-99	Former provincial slogan coincidentally similar to the U.S. state of Minnesota slogan, "10,000 LAKES" (which is still currently used on Minnesota plates).
	1976–82	Embossed purple serial on reflective yellow plate; border lines around plate and around bottom corners; "MANITOBA" centred at bottom; "76" at top right	"FRIENDLY" centred at top	ABC-123	AAA-101 to approximately GUW-999	Only letters A through E, G, H, K, L, N, S, T, U, W and X used in serials, and numbers 1–100 reserved in all series.
	1983–86	Embossed black serial on reflective white plate; border lines around plate and around bottom corners; "MANITOBA" screened in red centred at bottom; debossed "83" at bottom left	"FRIENDLY" screened in red centred at top	123 ABC	101 AAA to 500 DWT	The 1986 design changes were made in order to cut costs. Letters initially used in serials same as those on the 1976–82 base, plus P as second and/or third letter only; all letters used from the QAA series onwards (1995).
	1986 – June 16, 1997	As above, but non-reflective, and with province name embossed in black	As above, but embossed in black	123 ABC	501 DWT to approximately 999 QLV	The 1986 design changes were made in order to cut costs. Letters initially used in serials same as those on the 1976–82 base, plus P as second and/or third letter only; all letters used from the QAA series onwards (1995).
	June 17, 1997 – late 2012	Embossed dark blue serial on reflective white plate with river scene featuring green trees on either side and yellow wheat at the bottom; blue bison graphic screened at top right; "Manitoba" screened in blue at top, offset to right, with red maple leaf over the 'i'	"Friendly" screened in blue to left of province name, giving "Friendly Manitoba"	ABC 123	AAA 101 to BZZ 999; DAA 101 to GLW 999	Awarded "Plate of the Year" for best new standard-issue licence plate of 1997 by the Automobile License Plate Collectors Association, the first and, to date, only time Manitoba has been so honored. Co-recipient with Wisconsin. Letters I, O and Q not used in serials; 'C' series reserved for Commercial plates and 'J' series for alternative Bienvenue plates (below).
	late 2012 – present	As above, but with bison graphic changed from blue to black	"Friendly" screened in blue to left of province name, giving "Friendly Manitoba"	ABC 123	GLX 101 to HZZ 999; KAA 101 to MCX 825 (as of May 12, 2026)	Awarded "Plate of the Year" for best new standard-issue licence plate of 1997 by the Automobile License Plate Collectors Association, the first and, to date, only time Manitoba has been so honored. Co-recipient with Wisconsin. Letters I, O and Q not used in serials; 'C' series reserved for Commercial plates and 'J' series for alternative Bienvenue plates (below).
	February 25, 2013 – present	As above, but with bison graphic changed from blue to black	As above, plus "Bienvenue" screened in blue centered at bottom	ABC 123	JBA 101 to JCF 708 (as of May 22, 2026)	Alternative issue.

== Specialty plates ==
Image	Type	First issued	Design	Slogan	Serial format	Serials issued	Notes
	Winnipeg Blue Bombers – Blue	June 2011	Blue Text, Blue to white gradient and screened Winnipeg Blue Bombers logo	"Friendly" and "True Blue"	BB1234	BB0001 to BB9999	Serials BB0001 through BB0150 were issued only to current Bomber players, Alumni and executives.
	Winnipeg Blue Bombers – Gold	June 2012	?	"Friendly" and "Blue Bombers"	B12345	B00001 to present	
	Winnipeg Blue Bombers – Grey Cup	Circa 2019	?	"Friendly" and "Blue Bombers"	B12345	B00001 to present	
	Winnipeg Jets	December 2011	Blue serial on white and blue gradient plate with Jets logo screened at left	"Friendly" and "Fuelled By Passion"	WJ1234	WJ0001 to WJ9999	
	Winnipeg Jets	December 2011	Blue serial on white and blue gradient plate with Jets logo screened at left	"Friendly" and "Fuelled By Passion"	J12345	J00001 to present	
	Firefighter	September 2012	Blue serial on white and red gradient plate with Fire Department crest screened at left	"Friendly" and "Serving Our Community"	FF1234	FF0001 to FF9999	Issued to active or retired fire fighters and their immediate family. The number in the serial usually matches the fire fighter's badge number.
	Firefighter – Winnipeg	September 2012	Blue serial on white and red gradient plate with Fire Department crest screened at left	"Friendly" and "Serving Our Community"	WF1234	WF0001 to WF9999	Issued to active or retired fire fighters and their immediate family. The number in the serial usually matches the fire fighter's badge number.
	Winnipeg Goldeyes	March 2013	Blue serial on white and gold gradient plate with Goldeyes logo screened at left	"Friendly" and "Goldeyes"	G12345	G00001 to present	
	Curling Manitoba	December 2013	Black serial on white plate with yellow curling target screened at bottom and curling stone at left	"Friendly" and "curlingforlife.com"	CM1234	CM0001 to present	
	Brandon Wheat Kings	February 2014	Black serial on white and yellow gradient plate with Wheat Kings logo and three wheat stalks screened at left	"Friendly" and "Wheat Kings"	WK1234	WK0001 to present	
	University of Winnipeg	June 2014	Black serial on white and red plate with UWinnipeg campus screened in background and UWinnipeg crest at left	"Friendly" and "Discover, Achieve, Belong"	UW1234	UW0001 to present	
	Basketball Manitoba	June 2017					
	Winnipeg Jets Heritage	September 2021	Blue serial on white plate with 1973 Jets logo screened at left	"Friendly" and "Honour the Past"	JH1234	JH0001 to JH9999	
	Winnipeg Jets Heritage	September 2021	Blue serial on white plate with 1973 Jets logo screened at left	"Friendly" and "Honour the Past"	H12345	H00001 to present	
	Winnipeg Humane Society	April 2014		"Friendly" and "Animal Friendly"			Replaced in 2019 by the new 125th anniversary design.

== Non-passenger plates ==
Image	Type	Design	Serial format	Serials issued	Notes
	Collector	Embossed black serial on yellow plate; "Friendly Manitoba" and black bison graphic at top; "Collector" at bottom	CL12345	CL00001 to CL12299 (as of August 25, 2024)	First issued March 2014. Issued to cars and motorcycles that are at least 25 years old and are used only for pleasure.
	Commercial	As current passenger base	CBC 123	CAA 001 to CRM 999 (as of September 26, 2024)	
	Dealer	As current passenger base	D12345	D00001 to D70299 (as of August 22, 2024)	
	Livery	As current passenger base	XBC 123	XAA 001 to XAF 999 (as of December 20, 2017)	
	Motorcycle	Same design as current passenger base; "MC" embossed below serial	1AB23	1AA01 to 4EB99 (as of August 21, 2021)	
	Motorcycle	Same design as current passenger base; "MC" embossed below serial	1AB23	5EB01 to 7GH01 (as of August 1, 2022)	New smaller size. Continues on same serial format.
	Repairer		R12345	R00001 to R19260 (as of July 1, 2022)	
	Remote Area	As current passenger base	RA 1234	RA 0001 to ???	Used on vehicles in communities that are not connected to the provincial highway system.
	ORV	Embossed black serial on yellow plate; "MANITOBA" at top and "ORV" at bottom	123A4	1A1 to 999Z9	First issued 1988. 1A234 serial format commenced 2010.
	ORV	Embossed black serial on yellow plate; "MANITOBA" at top and "ORV" at bottom	1A234	1A001 to 7M878 (as of May 24, 2022)	First issued 1988. 1A234 serial format commenced 2010.
	PSV	As current passenger base	PBC 123	PAA 001 to PEB 330 (as of November 8, 2019)	
	Trailer	Same design as current passenger base; "TL" embossed below serial	A123B	A001A to Z999Z	123AB serial format commenced 2017.
	Trailer	Same design as current passenger base; "TL" embossed below serial	123AB	001AA to 433GE (as of May 15, 2022)	123AB serial format commenced 2017.
	Amateur Radio		AB1CD		123AB serial format commenced 2017.

== Vanity plates ==
The province also offers personalized vanity licence plates, at a cost of $100. These plates can be affixed to passenger vehicles, non-commercial trucks, farm trucks, motorcycles, mopeds and motorhomes.

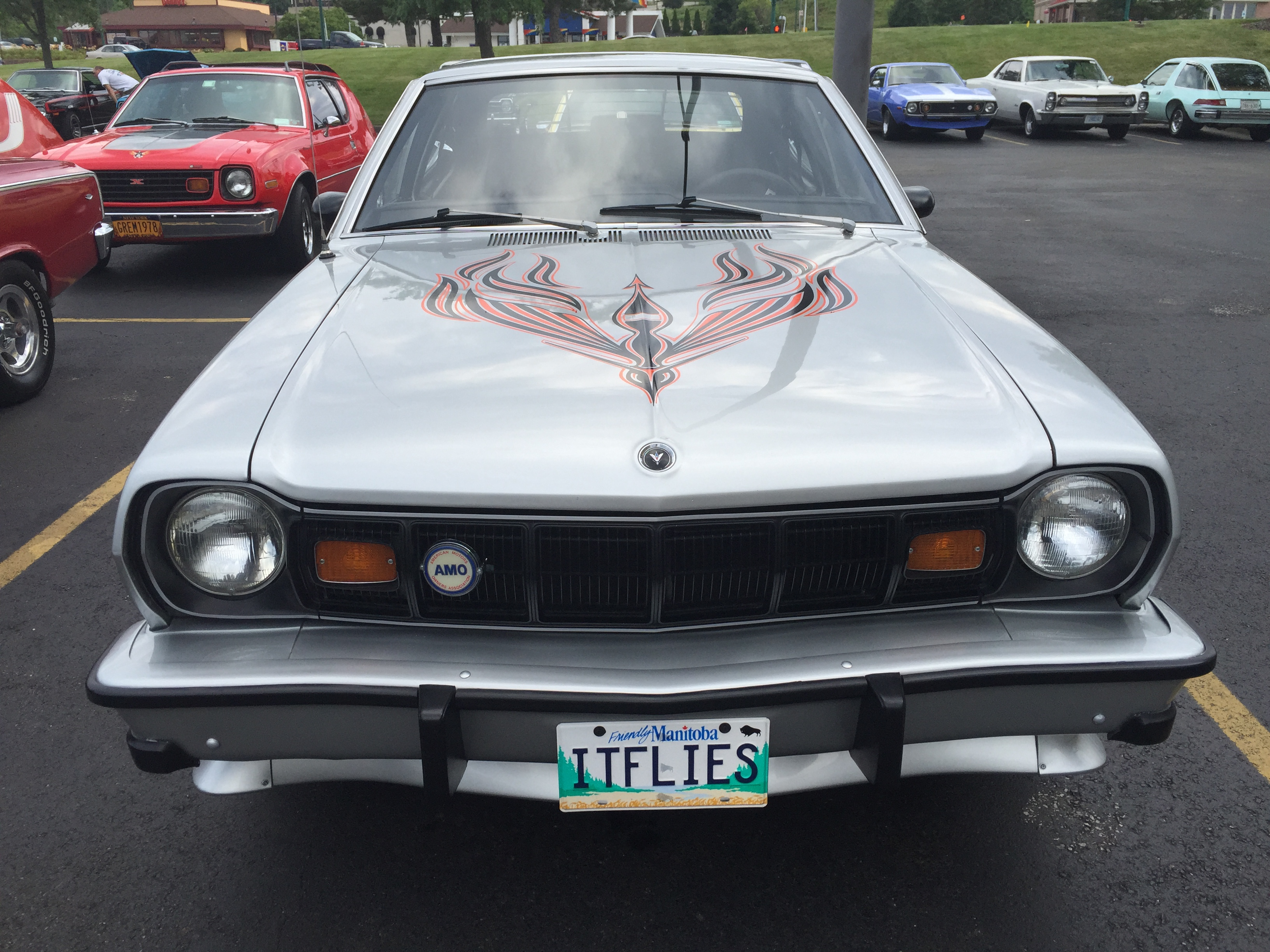
A 1977 AMC Hornet with a Manitoba vanity plate.
