= Robert Ferguson (Manitoba politician) =

Canadian politician (1866–1958)

Robert George Ferguson (June 2, 1866 – 1958) was a politician in Manitoba, Canada. He served in the Legislative Assembly of Manitoba from 1927 to 1932, as a member of the Conservative Party.

Ferguson was born in the township of Kitley, in Leeds County, Canada West, the son of John Ferguson. He was educated at Smith's Falls, moved to Manitoba in 1882, and worked as a farmer. He was a member of the I.O.O.F.

He was elected to the Manitoba legislature in the 1927 provincial election, defeating Progressive candidate George Palmer and incumbent Liberal Archibald Esplen in the constituency of Dauphin. The Progressive Party won a majority government, and Ferguson served on the opposition benches of the legislature. He did not seek re-election in 1932.
