= Ron Kostyshyn =

Canadian politician

The Honourable Ron Kostyshyn MLA

Manitoba Minister of Agriculture
- Incumbent
- Assumed office October 18, 2023
- Premier: Wab Kinew
- Preceded by: Derek Johnson

Member of the Legislative Assembly of Manitoba for Dauphin Swan River (2011-2016)
- Incumbent
- Assumed office October 3, 2023
- Preceded by: Brad Michaleski
- In office October 4, 2011 – April 19, 2016
- Preceded by: Rosann Wowchuk
- Succeeded by: Rick Wowchuk

Manitoba Minister of Infrastructure and Transportation
- In office December 23, 2014 – April 25, 2015
- Preceded by: Steve Ashton
- Succeeded by: Steve Ashton

Manitoba Minister of Agriculture, Food and Rural Initiatives
- In office January 13, 2012 – May 3, 2016
- Premier: Greg Selinger
- Preceded by: Stan Struthers
- Succeeded by: Ralph Eichler

Reeve of the Rural Municipality of Mossey River
- In office 2007–2009

Personal details
- Born: September 16, 1955 (age 70)
- Party: New Democratic
- Occupation: Farmer

Ronald Edward Kostyshyn is a Canadian politician, who was elected to the Legislative Assembly of Manitoba in the 2011 election. He represented the electoral district of Swan River as a member of the Manitoba New Democratic Party caucus. Kostyshyn was appointed Minister of Agriculture, Food and Rural Initiatives on January 13, 2012 under Premier Greg Selinger. He contested the 2016 election for the riding but was defeated by his Progressive Conservative opponent.

He subsequently won re-election to the legislature in the 2023 Manitoba general election in the district of Dauphin.

Born and raised in rural Manitoba, Kostyshyn graduated from Ethelbert High School in 1974, where his children also attended. For the past 26 years, Kostyshyn has worked on the family farm consisting of a 200 cow/calf operation with 2560 acres. He has served as Reeve of the RM of Mossey River and on council for two decades. He has also served on various boards including the Association of Manitoba Municipalities, Manitoba Conservation Commission, Intermountain Conservation District, Ethelbert District Veterinary Board, Farm Stewardship Association of Manitoba, and the Ethelbert Curling Club and Skating Rink.

Kostyshyn lives in the Ethelbert area and is married to his wife Judy. They have two adult daughters and one grandson.

== Electoral results ==
2011 Manitoba general election: Swan River
Party	Candidate	Votes	%	±%	Expenditures
New Democratic	Ron Kostyshyn	4,280	56.15	-2.25	$34,323.01
Progressive Conservative	Dave Powell	3,078	40.38	2.74	$21,167.11
Liberal	Reynold Cook	264	3.46	-0.49	$284.81
Total valid votes		7,622	–	–	
Rejected		46	–		
Eligible voters / turnout		12,853	59.66	-5.56	
Source(s) Source: Manitoba. Chief Electoral Officer (2011). Statement of Votes for the 40th Provincial General Election, October 4, 2011 (PDF) (Report). Winnipeg: Elections Manitoba.

2016 Manitoba general election: Swan River
Party	Candidate	Votes	%	±%	Expenditures
Progressive Conservative	Rick Wowchuk	4,105	56.19	15.80	$27,515.00
New Democratic	Ron Kostyshyn	2,422	33.15	-23.00	$32,595.02
Liberal	Shayne Lynxleg	482	6.60	3.13	$131.25
Green	Dan Soprovich	297	4.07	–	$2,061.05
Total valid votes		7,306	–	–	$39,956.00
Rejected		25	–		
Eligible voters / turnout		12,182	60.18	0.52	
Source(s) Source: Manitoba. Chief Electoral Officer (2016). Statement of Votes for the 41st Provincial General Election, April 19, 2016 (PDF) (Report). Winnipeg: Elections Manitoba."Election Returns: 41st General Election". Elections Manitoba. 2016.

2023 Manitoba general election: Dauphin
Party	Candidate	Votes	%	±%	Expenditures
New Democratic	Ron Kostyshyn	4,887	52.06	+9.67	$44,638.61
Progressive Conservative	Gord Wood	4,501	47.94	-2.57	$35,266.87
Total valid votes/expense limit		9,388	98.86	–	$61,663.00
Total rejected and declined ballots		108	1.14	–	
Turnout		9,496	60.30	+1.68	
Eligible voters		15,747			
New Democratic gain from Progressive Conservative		Swing		+6.12	
Source(s) Source: Elections Manitoba
