= John Plohman =

Canadian politician

John Stuart Hans Plohman (born May 11, 1948) is a former politician from Manitoba, Canada. He was a member of the Legislative Assembly of Manitoba from 1981 to 1995, and a cabinet minister in the NDP government of Premier Howard Pawley from 1982 to 1988.

The son of Hans W. Plohman and Anne Werstiuk, he was educated at the University of Manitoba, University of Winnipeg, and Red River Community College. He worked as a teacher before entering public life. In 1980, he was elected a municipal councillor in the town of Dauphin.

Plohman was elected to the Manitoba legislature in the provincial election of 1981 as a New Democrat, defeating incumbent Progressive Conservative Jim Galbraith by 636 votes in the central-northern riding of Dauphin. He entered cabinet on August 20, 1982, serving as Minister of Government Services with responsibility for the Manitoba Telephone Act. Following a cabinet shuffle on November 4, 1983, he became Minister of Highways and Transportation. On January 30, 1985, he was also named Minister of Government Services.

Plohman was re-elected by an increased margin in the 1986 provincial election. He relinquished the Government Services portfolio on February 4, 1987, and on September 21, 1987 he left the Highways and Transportation portfolio to accept the position of Minister of Natural Resources.

The Manitoba NDP were defeated in parliament in early 1988, when disgruntled backbench Member of the Legislative Assembly (MLA) Jim Walding voted against his government's budget. Despite this Plohman was re-elected in the following election, defeating Progressive Conservative Russell Secord by 548 votes. The NDP were reduced to 12 seats (out of 57) and third-party status following this election; Plohman formally resigned his cabinet portfolio on May 9 when the new government was sworn into office.

The NDP recovered to twenty seats in the provincial election of 1990, and Plohman was re-elected with an increased majority. He did not seek re-election in 1995 and returned to the teaching profession from which he retired in 2003.

In 2002, Plohman was appointed to a provincial advisory board recommending ways to stimulate economic growth at the Port of Churchill, in northern Manitoba. In 2004 he was appointed to the Board of Directors of the Churchill Gateway Development Corporation.

In 2005, Plohman was appointed as the first Chairman of the Board of the newly formed Manitoba Agriculture Services Corporation (MASC). In this capacity Plohman provided leadership in the amalgamation of the former Manitoba Agriculture Credit Corporation (MACC) and the Manitoba Crop Insurance Corporation (MCIC) into the dynamic MASC serving the lending and insurance needs of rural Manitobans. In 2014 Plohman was appointed to the Government of Manitoba's Crown Corporations Council as a Director from which he resigned on May 25, 2016.

John Plohman married Patricia Ann Yanke in 1971 and they have three children, Rychelle Anne Plohman Lytle, Dr. Jodi Lynn Plohman Jones and Robert James Plohman CA. They also have nine grandchildren.
