= CKDM =

Radio station in Dauphin, Manitoba

- Dauphin, Manitoba; Canada
- Broadcast area: Parkland Region
- Frequency: 730 kHz (AM)
- Branding: 730 CKDM

Programming
- Language: English
- Format: Country/Adult Contemporary
- Affiliations: Dauphin Kings

Ownership
- Owner: Dauphin Broadcasting

History
- First air date: January 5, 1951
- Former frequencies: 1230 kHz (1951–1956); 1050 kHz (1956–1958)
- Call sign meaning: CK Dauphin, Manitoba (broadcast area)

Technical information
- Class: B
- Power: 10,000 watts day 5,000 watts night
- Transmitter coordinates: 51°09′08″N 100°13′48″W

Links
- Webcast: Listen Live
- Website: 730ckdm.com

CKDM (730 kHz, 730 CKDM), is a commercial AM radio station located in Dauphin, Manitoba, voted Broadcast Dialogue's Canadian Small Market Station Of The Year in 2021. Owned by Dauphin Broadcasting, the station airs a mix of country, adult contemporary, community information and some religious programming.

CKDM broadcasts with a power of 10,000 watts daytime, 5,000 watts night-time; the signal is non-directional daytime, but uses a two-tower directional antenna night-time.

== History ==
Throughout its history, CKDM-AM has been owned by Dauphin Broadcasting Ltd.

Dauphin Broadcasting applied for a license in 1950, but was denied. After failing to receive a license from the CBC in 1950, another application for a broadcast license was approved in 1951 on 1230 kHz with 250 watts. Its first air date was on January 5, 1951. A move to 1050 kHz with 1000 watts was made in 1956.

In 1958, a further move to 730 kHz was made where the station has remained ever since.

In 1960, a 10,000-watt transmitter was purchased from Canadian Marconi Sales, though the increased power was not used until later in the decade.

In 1966, a power increase to 10,000 watts was made.

In 2015, CKDM moved out of its downtown studio, a location they had since 1951, and moved further away, to 1735 Main Street South. They also bought a new transmitter.
