= Peter Burtniak =

Canadian politician (1925-2004)

Member of the Legislative Assembly of Manitoba for Dauphin
- In office June 25, 1969 – October 11, 1977
- Preceded by: Stewart McLean
- Succeeded by: James Galbraith

Board Member, Manitoba Federation of Agriculture
- In office 1954–1956

Provincial Director Manitoba Farmers Union
- In office 1952–1956

Personal details
- Born: March 26, 1925 Fork River, Manitoba
- Died: April 8, 2004 (aged 79) Seven Oaks General Hospital, Winnipeg, Manitoba

Peter Burtniak (March 26, 1925 in Fork River, Manitoba – April 8, 2004) was a politician in Manitoba, Canada. He was a New Democratic member of the Legislative Assembly of Manitoba from 1969 to 1977, and served as a cabinet minister in the government of Edward Schreyer.

The son of Fred Burtniak and Pearl Kalinchuk, Burtniak was educated in the Manitoba school system, and worked as a farm implement dealer and farmer. During World War II, he served in the Fort Garry Horse Active Reserve Army Corps. He was President of the Fork River Branch of the Manitoba Pool Elevators for twenty years, and served as Provincial Director of the Manitoba Farmers Union from 1952 to 1956. He was also a board member of the Manitoba Federation of Agriculture from 1954 to 1956.

He first ran for the Manitoba legislature in the provincial election of 1958 as a candidate of the CCF in Ethelbert Plains, but lost to Liberal-Progressive incumbent Michael Hryhorczuk by 981 votes. He ran for the same riding in the 1959 election, this time losing to Hryhorczuk by 266 votes.

Burtniak backed Edward Schreyer for the provincial NDP leadership in 1969, and gave the nomination speech for Schreyer at the party's leadership convention. He was elected to the Manitoba legislature in the 1969 election, defeating former Progressive Conservative leadership candidate Stewart McLean by 41 votes in Dauphin. He NDP formed a minority government after this election, and Burtniak was appointed Minister of Tourism and Recreation on July 15, 1969. He was also given responsibility for the Manitoba Telephone System on August 4, 1970, and was given the second portfolio of Minister of Cultural Affairs on November 4, 1970. After a cabinet shuffle on December 1, 1971, he was named Minister of Highways, retaining responsibility for the MTS.

Burtniak defeated Tory candidate Art Rampton by 999 votes in the 1973 election, and was retained as Highways Minister in the Schreyer government's second term. He was also given responsibility for the Manitoba Public Insurance Corporation on September 22, 1976.

The NDP were defeated in the provincial election of 1977, and Burtniak narrowly lost his seat to Tory candidate James Galbraith. He did not seek a return to politics after this time.

He served as Vice-Chairman of the Manitoba Transport Board from 1982 to 1988.

Burtniak died in Seven Oaks General Hospital in Winnipeg at the age of 79.
