= W. Roger Graham =

Canadian historian

Roger Graham
- Born: March 10, 1919; Montreal, Quebec
- Died: November 17, 1988 (aged 69); Kingston, ON
- Education: United College; University of Toronto
- Known for: Biography of Arthur Meighen
- Awards: Fellow of the Royal Society of Canada
- Scientific career
- Institutions: Regina College; University of Saskatchewan; Queen's University
- Doctoral advisor: A.R.M. Lower

William Roger Graham, PhD, LLD, FRSC (March 10, 1919 – November 17, 1988) was a Canadian academic historian whose area of specialization was 20th-century Canadian political history.

== Biography ==
=== Early life and education ===
Born in Montreal March 10, 1919, Graham lived in Chicago, IL, where his father, William Creighton Graham, was a professor of Old Testament history, before moving with his family to Winnipeg, MB, Canada when his father became principal of what was then United College (now the University of Winnipeg). After completing his BA in history at United College, where he held the senior male student appointment of "Senior Stick" in his graduating year, Graham moved to Toronto where he completed his MA and PhD at the University of Toronto after marrying Kathleen McGirr (later Kathleen Birchall following her marriage to Air Commodore Leonard Birchall after Graham's death).

=== Career ===
In 1946, Graham took his first academic position at the University of Saskatchewan in Saskatoon, teaching there for one year before moving in 1947 to the Regina College (now the University of Regina), where he taught until 1958 (though on leave 1957-1958), when he accepted a position in the Department of History at the University of Saskatchewan, thus moving back to Saskatoon. He was awarded a Guggenheim Fellowship for the academic year 1961–1962. In 1968, he took up the position of Douglas Professor of Canadian History at Queen's University in Kingston, ON, where he remained until his retirement in 1984, serving a three-year term as chair of the Department of History and winning election to the Royal Society of Canada. In 1969, the University of Winnipeg awarded him the degree of Doctor of Laws, honoris causa. He died in Kingston on November 17, 1988.

Graham was the author of a number of works of political biography, of which the most important was his three-volume biography of Arthur Meighen published in Toronto by Clarke Irwin: The Door of Opportunity (1960), And Fortune Fled (1963), and No Surrender (1965). Other works by Graham include The King-Byng affair, 1926: A Question of Responsible Government (Copp Clark, 1973), a collection of papers related to the 1926 constitutional crisis that involved then Prime Minister W. L. Mackenzie King and Governor-General Lord Byng and the posthumously published Old Man Ontario: Leslie M. Frost (University of Toronto Press, 1991), a biography of former Premier of Ontario Leslie Frost. In addition to his full biography of Meighen, Graham also contributed a chapter called "Some political ideas of Arthur Meighen"' to a volume of essays edited by Marcel Hamelin, The political ideas of the prime ministers of Canada (Ottawa, 1969, pp. 107–20) and a booklet, Arthur Meighen, published by the Canadian Historical Association (Ottawa, 1968). With Frederick Gibson, Graham edited and completed the first volume of the history of Queen's University, Queen's University, Volume I, 1841-1917: And Not to Yield that had been begun by Hilda Neatby (1904–1975) but remained unfinished on her death; the volume appeared in 1978.

== Bibliography ==
- Arthur Meighen: A Biography (Toronto: Clarke Irwin, 1960–65): The Door of Opportunity (1960), And Fortune Fled (1963), and No Surrender (1965)
- Arthur Meighen (Ottawa: Canadian Historical Association, 1968)
- The political ideas of the prime ministers of Canada, in The political ideas of the prime ministers of Canada, ed. Marcel Hamelin (Ottawa: University of Ottawa Press, 1969, pp. 107–20)
- The King-Byng affair, 1926: A Question of Responsible Government (Toronto: Copp Clark, 1973)
- Old Man Ontario: Leslie M. Frost (Toronto: University of Toronto Press, 1991)

== External references ==
- The article on Arthur Meighen in the Dictionary of Canadian Biography Online contains an extended reference to Graham's work.
- The awarding of the LLD by the University of Winnipeg is confirmed by https://www.uwinnipeg.ca/index/hd-index.
