= John Gunne (English politician) =

English politician

John Gunne (fl. 1397) was an English politician.

He was a member (MP) of the parliament of England for Totnes in January 1397.
