= John Gunne (Manitoba politician) =

Canadian politician

John Robert Gunne (February 21, 1870 – June 5, 1935) was a physician and political figure in Manitoba. He represented Dauphin from 1903 to 1907 in the Legislative Assembly of Manitoba as a Conservative.

He was born in Florence, Lambton County, Ontario, the son of Robert Gunne, a native of Ireland. Gunne was educated there and at Manitoba Medical College. He moved to Dauphin, Manitoba in 1893, setting up practice there. In 1903, he married Christina Malcolm. Gunne moved to Kenora in 1905, practising there with his brother. He later practised in Winnipeg and then returned to Dauphin, where he set up a medical clinic. Gunne married Maizie Parker in 1928 after the death of his first wife.

He died in Dauphin at the age of 65.
