= Dauphin, Manitoba =

City in Canada

Dauphin
- City
- City of Dauphin
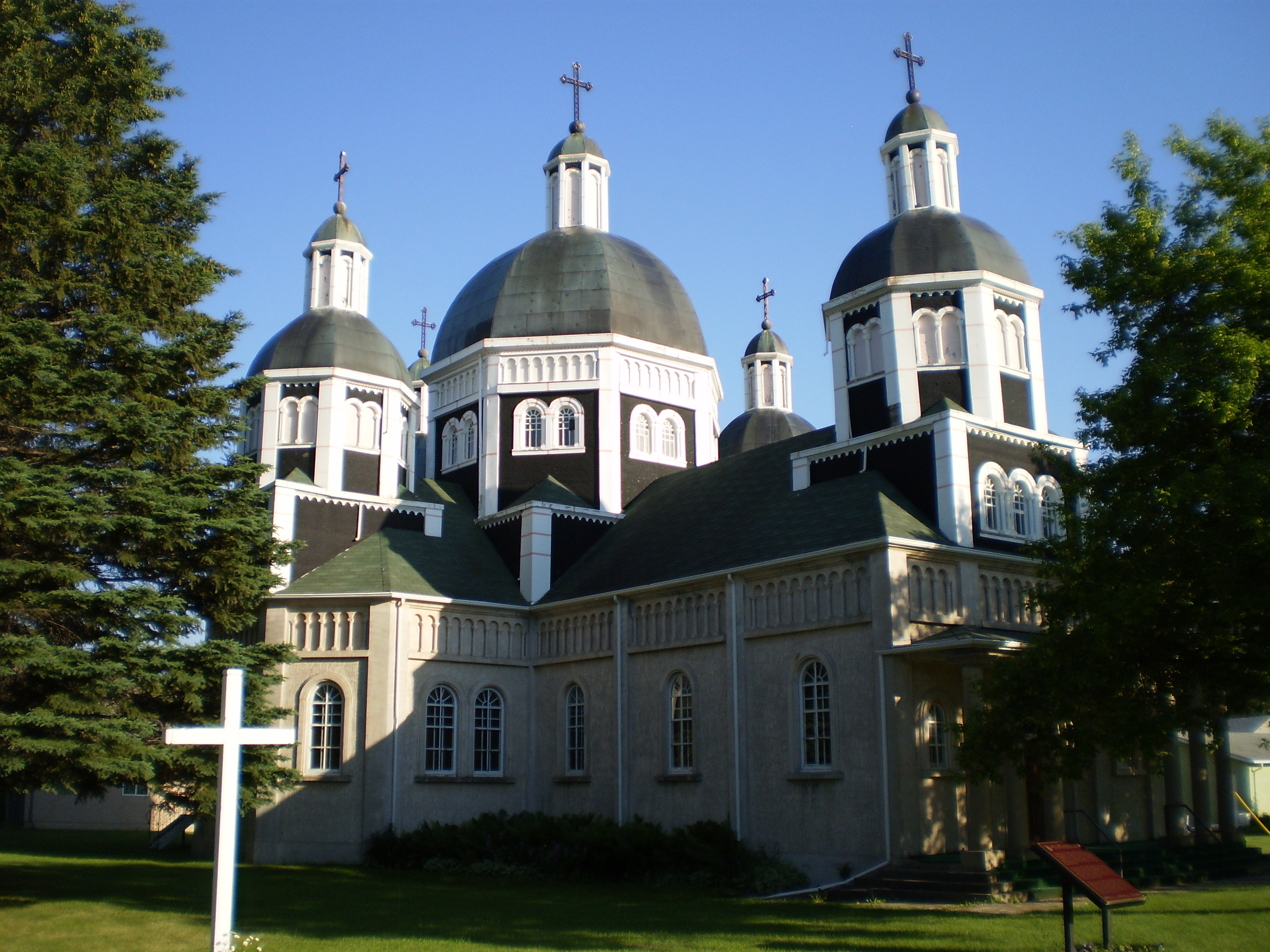
- The original Ukrainian Catholic Church of the Resurrection in Dauphin, Manitoba, a national historic site of Canada

- Seal
- Nickname: City of Sunshine
- Motto: "Everything You Deserve"
- City boundaries

- Location of Dauphin in Manitoba
- Coordinates: 51°08′58″N 100°02′58″W
- Country: Canada
- Province: Manitoba
- Region: Parkland
- Established: 1898

Government
  - City Mayor: David Bosiak
  - Governing Body: Dauphin City Council
  - MP (Riding Mountain): Dan Mazier
  - MLA (Dauphin): Ron Kostyshyn

Area
  - Total: 12.67 km^{2} (4.89 sq mi)
- Elevation: 268 m (879 ft)

Population (2021)
  - Total: 8,368 (9th)
  - Density: 660.5/km^{2} (1,711/sq mi)
- Time zone: UTC−5 (Central Daylight Time)
- Forward sortation area: R7N
- Area codes: 204, 431, 584
- Website: City of Dauphin

Dauphin (/ˈdɔːfən/) is a city in Manitoba, Canada, with a population of 8,368 as of the 2021 Canadian Census. The community is surrounded by the Rural Municipality of Dauphin. The city takes its name from Lake Dauphin and Fort Dauphin (first built 1741), which were named by explorer Pierre Gaultier de La Vérendrye in honour of the Dauphin of France, the heir to the French throne. Dauphin is Manitoba's ninth largest community and serves as a hub to the province's Parkland Region.

Dauphin hosts several summer festivals, including Dauphin's Countryfest and Canada's National Ukrainian Festival.

Dauphin is served by Provincial Trunk Highways 5, 10 and 20.

== Location ==
Dauphin is in western Manitoba near Duck Mountain Provincial Park and Riding Mountain National Park, just west of Lake Manitoba and Dauphin Lake and south of Lake Winnipegosis.

== History ==
The nearby lake was given the name "Dauphin" by the explorer Pierre Gaultier de Varennes, sieur de La Vérendrye in 1741 in honour of the heir to the French throne. Settlers began arriving in the area in 1883 and two early settlements, Gartmore and "Old Dauphin" were established. With the coming of the railway in 1896 – the line ran roughly halfway between the two villages – settlement shifted to the present site. This coincided with the beginning of Ukrainian settlement in the area: previously most arrivals had been of British extraction.

Dauphin was granted a village charter on 11 July 1898, with George Barker as first mayor. In 1901 Dauphin was incorporated as a town, with George King as mayor. Dauphin became an important centre for the transportation of grain. Farming still plays a central role in the economy of the area, but its role has been greatly reduced.

From 1974 to 1979, a federally funded pilot project called Mincome provided a basic income guarantee to residents of Dauphin.

Dauphin was incorporated as a city in 1998.

== Healthcare ==
Dauphin is a regional healthcare hub, part of the Prairie Mountain Health authority. The Dauphin General Hospital (now the Dauphin Regional Health Centre) was established in 1901. The Dauphin Medical Clinic provides access to family physicians and specialists, while providing a walk-in clinic and acute care.

== Economy ==
As the largest city within the Parkland, Dauphin has a trading area of over 50,000 people. A large part of Dauphin's economy is based on agriculture, with farms in this area of the province producing grains, oilseeds, honey and livestock. Dauphin is the home to various industries including manufacturing, health care, education, recreation/tourism and retail. The Canadian distribution centre for Norwex is also located in the city.

== Education ==
The first school building was erected in Dauphin in 1903, a frame building on the present Mackenzie School site. The original Whitmore School was built on Fifth Ave. SW in 1907, followed by the Smith-Jackson School on Main Street South in 1922. Today, the Mountain View School Division oversees K-12 education in Dauphin. The City of Dauphin has 7 schools including the Dauphin Regional Comprehensive Secondary School, Mackenzie Middle School, Henderson Elementary School, Lt. Colonel Barker VC School, École Macneill (French Immersion), Whitmore School and Smith-Jackson Ukrainian Bilingual School. The Assiniboine Community College Parkland Campus, located in Dauphin, provides post-secondary programming in the Parkland. Programs include business, agriculture, applied counseling, nursing and a range of apprenticeship courses.

== Government and politics ==
Dauphin is governed by a mayor and six councillors who are elected by residents. The current mayor of Dauphin is David Bosiak. The current Dauphin city councillors are Christian Laughland (deputy mayor), Steven Sobering, Kathy Bellemare, Randy Daley, Ted Rea, and Devin Shtykalo.

Dauphin is represented in the Legislative Assembly of Manitoba (as part of the Dauphin provincial electoral district) by New Democratic Party of Manitoba MLA, Ron Kostyshyn, and in the House of Commons of Canada (as part of the Riding Mountain riding) by Conservative MP, Dan Mazier.

== Transportation ==
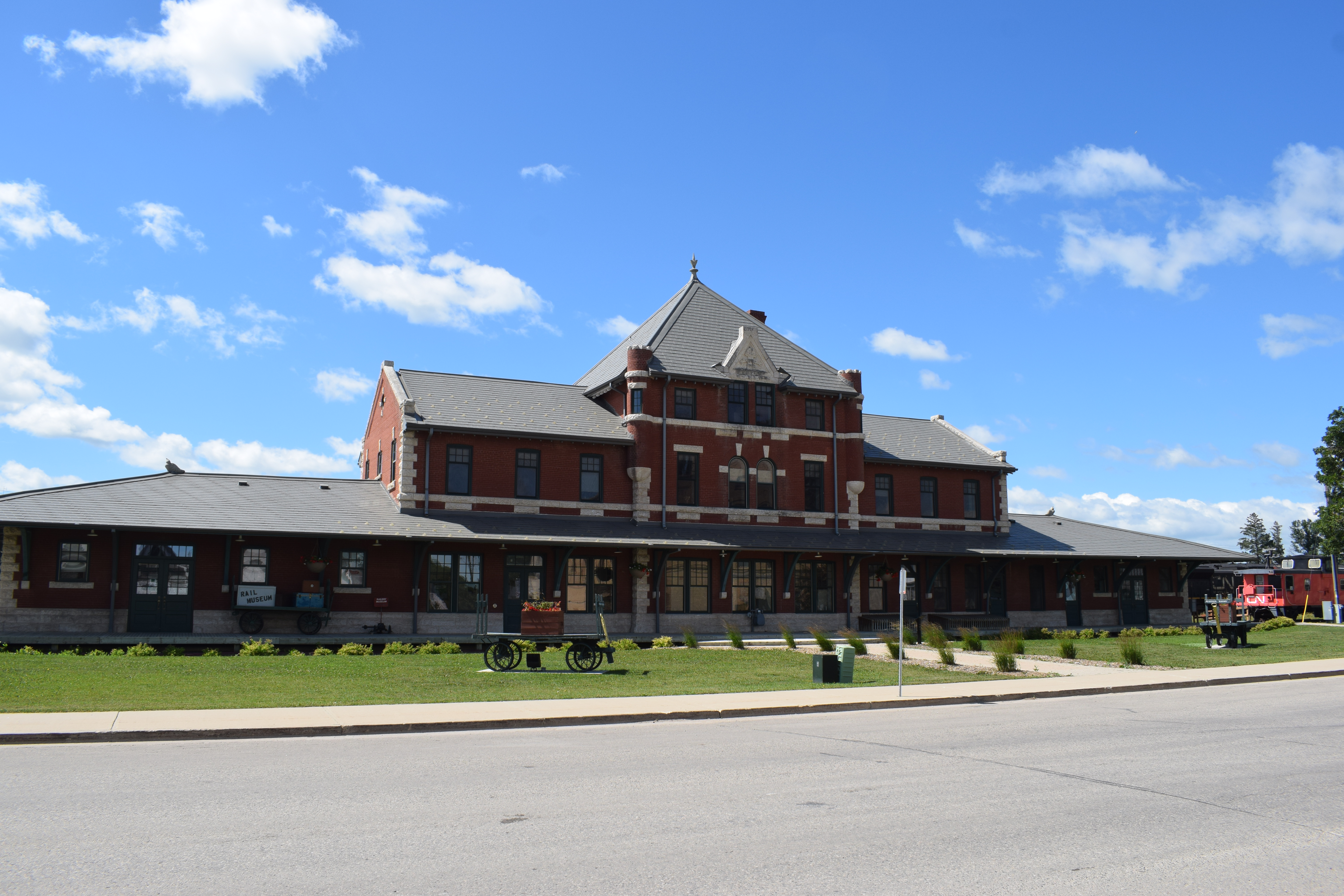
The historic Dauphin Canadian Northern Railway Station was built in 1912 and is Manitoba Provincial Heritage Site No. 100.

=== Ground ===
The city is served by Manitoba Provincial Trunk Highways:

- PTH 5
- PTH 10
- PTH 20
- PTH 5A
- PTH 10A
- PTH 20A

=== Air ===
Lt. Col W.G. (Billy) Barker VC Airport serves the area, however no scheduled flights are operated from the airport.

=== Rail ===
Dauphin railway station is served by Via Rail's Winnipeg–Churchill train. The rail line is owned by Canadian National (CN) which also operates freight trains through the town.

== Sports ==
Dauphin is a hockey community. The Credit Union Place recreation complex was built in 2006. It is the home of the Dauphin Kings, an MJHL Junior A hockey team, Turnbull Memorial Trophy winners in 1969, 1970, 1972, 1977, 1983, 1993, and 2010 and Anavet Cup winners of 2010. Formerly, the team played in the Dauphin Memorial Community Centre (D.M.C.C.) arena that was built after the Second World War. Dauphin and the Kings hosted the Royal Bank Cup in 2010, the Canadian National Championship for Junior A Hockey. The 1953–54 Dauphin Kings were inducted into the Manitoba Hockey Hall of Fame for winning the team's second Western Canadian Intermediate Championship in a decade and capturing the Edmonton Journal trophy.

Dauphin has a history of title-winning baseball teams. Both the Dauphin Redbirds and later the Dauphin Brewers have claimed numerous provincial titles.

Dauphin high schoolers play a big part of the athletics of Dauphin. They have won many awards and medals in volleyball, track and field, basketball, broomball, curling, football, and hockey.

A Dauphin rink composed of curlers Ab Gowanlock, Jim Williams, Art Pollon and Russ Jackman won the Brier, the Canadian men's curling championship, in 1953.

Dauphin has been called the "horseshoe capital of Canada," in large part due to the efforts of Bert Snart (1912–1988), president of the Dauphin Horseshoe Club for 32 years. In 1976 he was inducted into the Horseshoe Hall of Fame in Levittown, Pennsylvania.

== Demographics ==
Historical population
Year	Pop.	±%
1901	1,135	—
1911	2,815	+148.0%
1921	3,885	+38.0%
1931	3,971	+2.2%
1941	4,662	+17.4%
1951	6,007	+28.9%
1961	7,374	+22.8%
1996	8,266	+12.1%
2001	8,085	−2.2%
2006	7,906	−2.2%
2011	8,251	+4.4%
2016	8,369	+1.4%
2021	8,368	−0.0%

In the 2021 Census of Population conducted by Statistics Canada, Dauphin had a population of 8,368 living in 3,779 of its 4,048 total private dwellings, a change of −0% from its 2016 population of 8,369. With a land area of 12.67 km^{2} (4.89 sq mi), it had a population density of 660.5/km^{2} (1,710.6/sq mi) in 2021.

The median household income in 2005 was $35,527, below the Manitoba provincial average of $47,875.

=== Ethnicity ===
According to the 2021 Canadian census, Ukrainians constitute the largest ethnic group in the City of Dauphin, with 29.99% of the population. 5.7% of the population can speak Ukrainian. 18.8% of the residents have English ancestry, 15.3% Scottish ancestry, and 14.07% Irish ancestry, and 27.54% are of Aboriginal origin.

Panethnic groups in the City of Dauphin (2001−2021)
Panethnic group	2021		2016		2011		2006		2001	
Panethnic group	Pop.	%	Pop.	%	Pop.	%	Pop.	%	Pop.	%
European (Note: Statistic includes all persons that did not make up part of a visible minority or an indigenous identity.)	5,320	65.4%	5,430	69.7%	6,050	75.3%	6,160	79.59%	6,970	87.45%
Indigenous	2,240	27.54%	2,050	26.32%	1,870	23.27%	1,505	19.44%	885	11.1%
Southeast Asian (Note: Statistic includes total responses of "Filipino" and "Southeast Asian" under visible minority section on census.)	195	2.4%	120	1.54%	60	0.75%	45	0.58%	20	0.25%
South Asian	170	2.09%	95	1.22%	0	0%	0	0%	45	0.56%
African	110	1.35%	15	0.19%	0	0%	15	0.19%	10	0.13%
East Asian (Note: Statistic includes total responses of "Chinese", "Korean", and "Japanese" under visible minority section on census.)	40	0.49%	60	0.77%	40	0.5%	0	0%	45	0.56%
Middle Eastern (Note: Statistic includes total responses of "West Asian" and "Arab" under visible minority section on census.)	20	0.25%	0	0%	0	0%	0	0%	0	0%
Latin American	10	0.12%	30	0.39%	0	0%	10	0.13%	10	0.13%
Other/multiracial (Note: Statistic includes total responses of "Visible minority, n.i.e." and "Multiple visible minorities" under visible minority section on census.)	0	0%	10	0.13%	0	0%	10	0.13%	0	0%
Total responses	8,135	97.22%	7,790	93.08%	8,035	97.38%	7,740	97.9%	7,970	98.58%
Total population	8,368	100%	8,369	100%	8,251	100%	7,906	100%	8,085	100%
Note: Totals greater than 100% due to multiple origin responses

== Climate ==
Dauphin has a humid continental climate (Köppen Dfb) with cold winters and warm summers. The highest temperature ever recorded in Dauphin was 43.3 °C (110 °F) on 25 June 1919. The coldest temperature ever recorded was −44.4 °C (−48 °F) on 25 February 1890 and 18 February 1966.

Climate data for Dauphin Airport, 1991–2020 normals, extremes 1890–present (Note: Climate data was recorded at Dauphin from January 1890 to December 1941 and at Dauphin Airport from January 1942 to present.)
Month	Jan	Feb	Mar	Apr	May	Jun	Jul	Aug	Sep	Oct	Nov	Dec	Year
Record high °C (°F)	9.6 (49.3)	13.9 (57.0)	24.2 (75.6)	35.2 (95.4)	39.2 (102.6)	43.3 (110.0)	40.0 (104.0)	39.0 (102.2)	37.8 (100.0)	31.1 (88.0)	23.3 (73.9)	13.9 (57.0)	40.6 (105.1)
Mean daily maximum °C (°F)	−10.7 (12.7)	−8.0 (17.6)	−0.9 (30.4)	9.3 (48.7)	17.2 (63.0)	22.3 (72.1)	25.1 (77.2)	24.6 (76.3)	18.9 (66.0)	9.8 (49.6)	−0.4 (31.3)	−8.0 (17.6)	8.3 (46.9)
Daily mean °C (°F)	−15.8 (3.6)	−13.6 (7.5)	−6.5 (20.3)	2.9 (37.2)	10.2 (50.4)	16.1 (61.0)	18.8 (65.8)	17.8 (64.0)	12.3 (54.1)	4.3 (39.7)	−5.0 (23.0)	−12.9 (8.8)	2.4 (36.3)
Mean daily minimum °C (°F)	−20.9 (−5.6)	−19.1 (−2.4)	−12.2 (10.0)	−3.6 (25.5)	3.0 (37.4)	9.8 (49.6)	12.4 (54.3)	10.8 (51.4)	5.7 (42.3)	−1.2 (29.8)	−9.6 (14.7)	−17.7 (0.1)	−3.5 (25.7)
Record low °C (°F)	−43.3 (−45.9)	−44.4 (−47.9)	−39.0 (−38.2)	−27.8 (−18.0)	−15.4 (4.3)	−6.1 (21.0)	0.6 (33.1)	−1.1 (30.0)	−9.7 (14.5)	−21.7 (−7.1)	−34.5 (−30.1)	−41.1 (−42.0)	−44.4 (−47.9)
Average precipitation mm (inches)	16.9 (0.67)	12.0 (0.47)	25.3 (1.00)	25.9 (1.02)	51.3 (2.02)	86.6 (3.41)	70.7 (2.78)	54.7 (2.15)	52.8 (2.08)	31.2 (1.23)	17.7 (0.70)	17.3 (0.68)	462.3 (18.20)
Average rainfall mm (inches)	0.4 (0.02)	0.3 (0.01)	5.5 (0.22)	17.1 (0.67)	52.9 (2.08)	81.7 (3.22)	73.1 (2.88)	61.3 (2.41)	57.2 (2.25)	29.4 (1.16)	4.5 (0.18)	0.6 (0.02)	383.7 (15.11)
Average snowfall cm (inches)	16.6 (6.5)	14.3 (5.6)	20.2 (8.0)	12.9 (5.1)	3.3 (1.3)	0.3 (0.1)	0.0 (0.0)	0.0 (0.0)	1.0 (0.4)	6.0 (2.4)	17.9 (7.0)	21.3 (8.4)	113.7 (44.8)
Average precipitation days (≥ 0.2 mm)	12.1	9.4	10.5	8.8	11.8	15.5	14.7	11.6	12.6	10.2	9.1	11.0	137.2
Average rainy days (≥ 0.2 mm)	0.65	0.58	2.5	5.5	10.7	14.4	12.5	11.2	11.7	7.9	2.0	0.50	80.1
Average snowy days (≥ 0.2 cm)	11.4	7.7	7.4	3.2	0.75	0.05	0.0	0.0	0.25	2.8	7.4	11.1	52.0
Mean monthly sunshine hours	113.1	132.5	167.2	219.0	260.9	263.7	301.8	274.2	171.0	140.0	92.7	94.9	2,230.9
Percentage possible sunshine	43.2	47.2	45.5	52.9	54.2	53.4	60.6	60.7	44.9	42.1	34.4	38.3	48.1
Source: Environment Canada (rain, snow, sun 1981–2010)

== Local media ==
Newspapers

- Dauphin Herald

Radio

- CKDM 730 AM, Country and Adult Contemporary
- CBWW-FM 105.3, CBC Radio One (repeats CBW Winnipeg)
- (Future Station) 106.1, CBC Radio Two

Television

Dauphin was formerly served by a local newscast, which aired on the city's now-defunct retransmitter of CBWT Winnipeg but was produced by Craig Media instead of by CBC Television.

OTA channel	Call sign	Network	Notes
2 (VHF)	CKND-TV-2	Global	Rebroadcaster of CKND-DT (Winnipeg)
12 (VHF)	CKYD-TV	CTV	Rebroadcaster of CKY-DT (Winnipeg)
27 (UHF)	CHMI-TV-3	City	Rebroadcaster of CHMI-DT (Winnipeg)

== Notable people ==
- Aimé Adam, politician
- George Balcan, radio broadcaster
- James Ball competed for Canada in the 1928 Summer Olympics held in Amsterdam, Netherlands in the 400 metres, where he won the silver medal
- Lt.-Col. William George Barker, VC, Canada's most decorated serviceman; born in Dauphin in 1894; namesake of the Dauphin airport and a school
- Frances Bay (1919–2011), attended school in Dauphin; actress in TV and films; Blue Velvet, Happy Gilmore
- James Whitney Bettes, politician
- Angus Bonnycastle, politician
- John C. Bowen, politician
- James Langstaff Bowman (1879–1951), a Dauphin lawyer; first Manitoban to be Speaker of the House of Commons
- Donald Bryk, judge
- Theodore Arthur Burrows (1857–1929), sometime MLA and MP for Dauphin, lieutenant-governor of Manitoba from 1926 until his death
- Don Caley (1945-2016), hockey goaltender who played one game in the NHL for the St. Louis Blues
- Jim Cardiff, hockey player
- Robert Cruise, politician
- Will Ferguson, writer
- James Galbraith, politician
- Tammy Gillis, actress
- Erving Goffman (1922–1982), acclaimed sociologist and author of The Presentation of Self in Everyday Life; grew up in Dauphin
- John Gunne, politician
- Robin Hahn, equestrian
- Christine Harapiak, judge
- Robert Hawkins, Speaker of the Manitoba Legislature 1937–1949
- Ernest Charles Hoy, born in Dauphin in 1895; World War I flying ace who scored 13 victories in just a month and a half in 1918; on 7 August 1919, flew the first airmail flight over the Canadian Rockies
- Russ Jackman, curler
- Robert Kabel, hockey player
- Mike Korney, hockey player
- Les Kozak, hockey player
- Brigette Lacquette, hockey player
- Laverne Lewycky, politician
- Inky Mark, former mayor of Dauphin, and former member of parliament for the riding of Dauphin—Swan River—Marquette
- Means, musical group
- Ernest McGirr, politician
- Ben Meisner, radio broadcaster
- Barry Merrell, hockey player
- Bif Naked (born Beth Torbert on 15 June 1971), Juno Award-winning Canadian rock singer-songwriter, poet, cartoonist, and actress; attended Dauphin Regional Comprehensive Secondary School in the 1980s
- Joan O'Malley, seamstress of first Canadian flag
- John Plohman, politician
- Art Pollon, curler
- W. B. Scarth, politician
- Ted Schellenberg, politician
- Jim Schraefel, hockey player
- Panteleymon Shpylka, priest
- John Solomon, politician
- Barry Trotz, former head coach of the National Hockey League's New York Islanders and 2018 Stanley cup winner; born and raised in Dauphin
- William John Ward, politician
- Troy Westwood, longtime CFLer for the Winnipeg Blue Bombers
- Thomas Wilkinson, bishop
- Jim Williams, curler
- Fred Zaplitny, politician

== See also ==
- Royal eponyms in Canada
