= 1949 Macdonald Brier =

Canadian men's curling championship

- Host city: Hamilton, Ontario
- Arena: Hamilton Forum
- Dates: March 7–11
- Attendance: 16,500
- Winner: Manitoba
- Curling club: Strathcona CC, Winnipeg
- Skip: Ken Watson
- Third: Grant Watson
- Second: Lyle Dyker
- Lead: Charles Reid

The 1949 Macdonald Brier, the Canadian men's national curling championship, was held from March 7 to 11, 1949 at Hamilton Forum in Hamilton, Ontario.

Team Manitoba, skipped by Ken Watson, captured the Brier Tankard by finishing round robin play unbeaten with a 9-0 record. This was Manitoba's twelfth Brier championship and the sixth time that a team finished the Brier unbeaten. Watson would become the first skip to win the Brier three times, as his rink won previously in 1936 and 1942.

This was the first Brier in which two teams (Manitoba and British Columbia) entered the final draw unbeaten, and the first Brier since 1936 to feature a "winner take all" match in the round robin to decide the Brier champion.

This was also the fourth Brier in which there were no extra ends.

== Event summary ==
Both Manitoba and the defending champion British Columbia dominated the 1949 Brier as they were both unbeaten heading into the final draw, which would be a "winner take all" match to decide the Brier.

In the deciding game, BC opened with 3 in the first end, but Manitoba would score 7 in the next five ends to take a 7-3 lead through the halfway point. BC would score 3 in the seventh to cut Manitoba's lead to 7-6, but Manitoba would counter in the next end with 3 of their own to increase the lead to 10-6. The next two ends ended in similar fashion as BC scored 2 in the ninth and Manitoba countering with 2 in the tenth. BC would score 1 in the eleventh end and trailed 12-9 heading into the last end needing a big steal to keep their hopes alive. Manitoba would clinch the Brier with 2 in the final end for a 14-9 victory, securing Watson's place in Brier history as the first skip to win three Briers.

== Teams ==
The teams are listed as follows:

Alberta	British Columbia	Manitoba	New Brunswick	Northern Ontario
Blackie CC, Blackie Skip: Stu Beagle; Third: Walker Evans; Second: Ray Wellman; Lead: Ed Seney	Trail CC, Trail Skip: Reg Stone; Third: Hugh Miller; Second: Roy Stone; Lead: Scotty Ross	Granite CC, Winnipeg Skip: Ken Watson; Third: Grant Watson; Second: Lyle Dyker; Lead: Charles Reid	Newcastle CC, Newcastle Skip: Bob Galloway; Third: Waldo Crocker; Second: Clarence McDonald; Lead: Arthur Galloway	McIntyre CC, Schumacher Skip: Jimmy Sutherland; Third: Elmer Dick; Second: Ken Vail; Lead: Hugh Calverley
Nova Scotia	Ontario	Prince Edward Island	Quebec	Saskatchewan
Halifax CC, Halifax Skip: Horace Webb; Third: Urban Harrington; Second: Bernard Cleveland; Lead: Ted Sievert	Chatham Granite Club, Chatham Skip: Peter Gilbert; Third: Gord Gilbert; Second: Don Painter; Lead: John DeKoning	Charlottetown CC, Charlottetown Skip: Russ Cruikshank; Third: Heath McIntyre; Second: James Howatt; Lead: Hiram Atkinson	C de C Matane, Matane Skip: Roderique Cote; Third: Herm Gagnon; Second: Charles Cote; Lead: Maurice Piuze	Caledonia CC, Regina Skip: Harold Horeak; Third: Edward Richter; Second: John Heaney; Lead: Ernest Kittleson

== Round robin standings ==
Key
Brier champion

Province	Skip	W	L	PF	PA
Manitoba	Ken Watson	9	0	130	70
British Columbia	Reg Stone	8	1	119	76
Northern Ontario	Jimmy Sutherland	7	2	121	84
Ontario	Peter Gilbert	5	4	102	96
Saskatchewan	Harold Horeak	4	5	95	100
Nova Scotia	Horace Webb	4	5	98	90
Prince Edward Island	Russ Cruikshank	3	6	77	109
New Brunswick	Bob Galloway	2	7	77	112
Quebec	Roderique Cote	2	7	72	112
Alberta	Stu Beagle	1	8	68	110

== Round robin results ==
=== Draw 1 ===
Sheet A	1	2	3	4	5	6	7	8	9	10	11	12	Final
Manitoba (Watson)	4	1	0	5	0	2	1	0	1	1	0	2	17
New Brunswick (Galloway)	0	0	1	0	2	0	0	1	0	0	1	0	5

Sheet B	1	2	3	4	5	6	7	8	9	10	11	12	Final
Northern Ontario (Sutherland)	0	0	3	0	3	0	1	0	2	0	0	4	13
British Columbia (Stone)	2	2	0	1	0	3	0	2	0	4	2	0	16

Sheet C	1	2	3	4	5	6	7	8	9	10	11	12	Final
Quebec (Cote)	0	2	0	0	0	1	0	1	0	0	1	0	5
Saskatchewan (Horeak)	2	0	1	2	4	0	1	0	2	1	0	1	14

Sheet D	1	2	3	4	5	6	7	8	9	10	11	12	Final
Alberta (Beagle)	0	0	0	2	0	0	1	0	0	1	1	0	5
Prince Edward Island (Cruikshank)	1	1	1	0	1	1	0	2	1	0	0	2	10

Sheet E	1	2	3	4	5	6	7	8	9	10	11	12	Final
Ontario (Gilbert)	0	2	0	0	3	1	2	0	0	2	0	1	11
Nova Scotia (Webb)	1	0	3	1	0	0	0	1	1	0	2	0	9

=== Draw 2 ===
Sheet A	1	2	3	4	5	6	7	8	9	10	11	12	Final
New Brunswick (Galloway)	0	3	0	0	0	0	0	2	0	1	1	0	7
British Columbia (Stone)	1	0	2	1	2	2	4	0	1	0	0	2	15

Sheet B	1	2	3	4	5	6	7	8	9	10	11	12	Final
Manitoba (Watson)	3	0	1	0	1	0	1	0	4	0	5	0	15
Saskatchewan (Horeak)	0	1	0	2	0	2	0	2	0	1	0	1	9

Sheet C	1	2	3	4	5	6	7	8	9	10	11	12	Final
Prince Edward Island (Cruikshank)	0	0	0	2	0	1	2	0	0	1	0	1	7
Northern Ontario (Sutherland)	2	1	1	0	3	0	0	4	2	0	1	0	14

Sheet D	1	2	3	4	5	6	7	8	9	10	11	12	Final
Nova Scotia (Webb)	1	0	4	3	0	1	0	0	2	1	0	1	13
Quebec (Cote)	0	1	0	0	2	0	2	2	0	0	3	0	10

Sheet E	1	2	3	4	5	6	7	8	9	10	11	12	Final
Ontario (Gilbert)	0	0	3	0	1	2	0	3	3	0	0	1	13
Alberta (Beagle)	2	2	0	1	0	0	2	0	0	1	1	0	9

=== Draw 3 ===
Sheet A	1	2	3	4	5	6	7	8	9	10	11	12	Final
Northern Ontario (Sutherland)	3	1	0	1	0	4	2	0	3	0	1	1	16
Alberta (Beagle)	0	0	1	0	1	0	0	2	0	1	0	0	5

Sheet B	1	2	3	4	5	6	7	8	9	10	11	12	Final
Ontario (Gilbert)	0	0	1	0	1	1	0	0	2	0	1	0	6
British Columbia (Stone)	3	1	0	1	0	0	2	1	0	4	0	2	14

Sheet C	1	2	3	4	5	6	7	8	9	10	11	12	Final
Saskatchewan (Horeak)	4	0	0	1	0	1	0	1	1	1	0	0	9
Prince Edward Island (Cruikshank)	0	1	1	0	4	0	2	0	0	0	3	3	14

Sheet D	1	2	3	4	5	6	7	8	9	10	11	12	Final
New Brunswick (Galloway)	1	0	1	1	1	1	0	1	0	1	0	0	7
Nova Scotia (Webb)	0	3	0	0	0	0	1	0	4	0	2	3	13

Sheet E	1	2	3	4	5	6	7	8	9	10	11	12	Final
Manitoba (Watson)	0	2	5	2	2	2	0	1	0	1	0	1	16
Quebec (Cote)	1	0	0	0	0	0	1	0	1	0	2	0	5

=== Draw 4 ===
Sheet A	1	2	3	4	5	6	7	8	9	10	11	12	Final
British Columbia (Stone)	2	0	3	0	2	0	0	0	2	0	0	2	11
Alberta (Beagle)	0	2	0	1	0	2	0	3	0	1	1	0	10

Sheet B	1	2	3	4	5	6	7	8	9	10	11	12	Final
New Brunswick (Galloway)	1	0	2	0	2	3	0	2	1	1	1	0	13
Quebec (Cote)	0	1	0	2	0	0	1	0	0	0	0	1	5

Sheet C	1	2	3	4	5	6	7	8	9	10	11	12	Final
Saskatchewan (Horeak)	2	0	1	0	4	2	0	4	0	1	0	0	14
Nova Scotia (Webb)	0	1	0	1	0	0	2	0	1	0	2	1	8

Sheet D	1	2	3	4	5	6	7	8	9	10	11	12	Final
Manitoba (Watson)	2	0	0	3	3	1	0	3	0	0	3	0	15
Northern Ontario (Sutherland)	0	1	1	0	0	0	4	0	1	2	0	0	9

Sheet E	1	2	3	4	5	6	7	8	9	10	11	12	Final
Prince Edward Island (Cruikshank)	1	0	4	0	0	0	2	1	0	1	0	1	10
Ontario (Gilbert)	0	5	0	2	2	1	0	0	3	0	5	0	18

=== Draw 5 ===
Sheet A	1	2	3	4	5	6	7	8	9	10	11	12	Final
Prince Edward Island (Cruikshank)	1	0	0	0	0	1	0	1	0	3	0	0	6
British Columbia (Stone)	0	2	1	2	2	0	1	0	2	0	1	2	13

Sheet B	1	2	3	4	5	6	7	8	9	10	11	12	Final
Alberta (Beagle)	0	0	1	0	1	0	0	0	0	0	3	0	5
Quebec (Cote)	1	1	0	1	0	1	2	2	1	1	0	3	13

Sheet C	1	2	3	4	5	6	7	8	9	10	11	12	Final
Ontario (Gilbert)	0	2	0	1	0	1	0	2	0	0	0	3	9
Northern Ontario (Sutherland)	1	0	2	0	1	0	2	0	1	5	1	0	13

Sheet D	1	2	3	4	5	6	7	8	9	10	11	12	Final
Saskatchewan (Horeak)	1	1	1	2	3	0	1	1	0	0	3	1	14
New Brunswick (Galloway)	0	0	0	0	0	1	0	0	4	4	0	0	9

Sheet E	1	2	3	4	5	6	7	8	9	10	11	12	Final
Manitoba (Watson)	0	3	3	0	0	1	0	2	0	3	0	0	12
Nova Scotia (Webb)	3	0	0	1	1	0	1	0	3	0	2	0	11

=== Draw 6 ===
Sheet A	1	2	3	4	5	6	7	8	9	10	11	12	Final
Quebec (Cote)	1	0	1	1	0	0	1	0	3	0	1	2	10
British Columbia (Stone)	0	2	0	0	3	4	0	1	0	6	0	0	16

Sheet B	1	2	3	4	5	6	7	8	9	10	11	12	Final
New Brunswick (Galloway)	0	0	0	1	0	0	2	0	3	0	0	2	8
Ontario (Gilbert)	1	3	2	0	2	3	0	2	0	1	2	0	16

Sheet C	1	2	3	4	5	6	7	8	9	10	11	12	Final
Prince Edward Island (Cruikshank)	0	1	0	0	3	0	1	1	0	0	0	1	7
Manitoba (Watson)	4	0	4	1	0	2	0	0	2	1	2	0	16

Sheet D	1	2	3	4	5	6	7	8	9	10	11	12	Final
Nova Scotia (Webb)	1	0	0	0	1	0	3	1	0	2	0	2	10
Northern Ontario (Sutherland)	0	1	3	0	0	2	0	0	2	0	3	0	11

Sheet E	1	2	3	4	5	6	7	8	9	10	11	12	Final
Saskatchewan (Horeak)	1	0	2	0	1	2	0	1	0	2	0	2	11
Alberta (Beagle)	0	2	0	2	0	0	2	0	1	0	1	0	8

=== Draw 7 ===
Sheet A	1	2	3	4	5	6	7	8	9	10	11	12	Final
British Columbia (Stone)	1	1	1	0	2	1	0	0	2	1	2	1	12
Saskatchewan (Horeak)	0	0	0	1	0	0	2	1	0	0	0	0	4

Sheet B	1	2	3	4	5	6	7	8	9	10	11	12	Final
Quebec (Cote)	4	0	0	0	3	0	0	1	1	0	1	1	11
Ontario (Gilbert)	0	1	1	1	0	1	1	0	0	1	0	0	6

Sheet C	1	2	3	4	5	6	7	8	9	10	11	12	Final
Nova Scotia (Webb)	0	4	1	3	1	2	1	0	1	0	1	0	14
Prince Edward Island (Cruikshank)	1	0	0	0	0	0	0	1	0	2	0	2	6

Sheet D	1	2	3	4	5	6	7	8	9	10	11	12	Final
Manitoba (Watson)	1	1	1	0	1	3	0	0	3	0	2	2	14
Alberta (Beagle)	0	0	0	3	0	0	0	2	0	2	0	0	7

Sheet E	1	2	3	4	5	6	7	8	9	10	11	12	Final
Northern Ontario (Sutherland)	3	0	3	0	3	0	1	0	3	2	0	0	15
New Brunswick (Galloway)	0	1	0	1	0	1	0	2	0	0	3	1	9

=== Draw 8 ===
Sheet A	1	2	3	4	5	6	7	8	9	10	11	12	Final
Alberta (Beagle)	0	1	2	0	1	0	1	2	3	2	0	1	13
New Brunswick (Galloway)	1	0	0	1	0	1	0	0	0	0	5	0	8

Sheet B	1	2	3	4	5	6	7	8	9	10	11	12	Final
Northern Ontario (Sutherland)	1	1	4	0	4	0	2	0	2	0	0	0	14
Saskatchewan (Horeak)	0	0	0	2	0	2	0	1	0	1	2	1	9

Sheet C	1	2	3	4	5	6	7	8	9	10	11	12	Final
Prince Edward Island (Cruikshank)	3	2	1	0	0	2	2	0	2	1	0	0	13
Quebec (Cote)	0	0	0	3	1	0	0	1	0	0	2	2	9

Sheet D	1	2	3	4	5	6	7	8	9	10	11	12	Final
Ontario (Gilbert)	0	1	0	1	0	1	0	1	2	1	1	0	8
Manitoba (Watson)	3	0	3	0	3	0	1	0	0	0	0	1	11

Sheet E	1	2	3	4	5	6	7	8	9	10	11	12	Final
British Columbia (Stone)	1	0	3	1	1	0	3	2	0	2	0	0	13
Nova Scotia (Webb)	0	1	0	0	0	1	0	0	1	0	2	1	6

=== Draw 9 ===
Sheet A	1	2	3	4	5	6	7	8	9	10	11	12	Final
Saskatchewan (Horeak)	0	2	0	0	2	0	0	1	0	3	0	3	11
Ontario (Gilbert)	1	0	2	1	0	3	2	0	2	0	4	0	15

Sheet B	1	2	3	4	5	6	7	8	9	10	11	12	Final
Quebec (Cote)	0	1	1	0	0	0	1	0	0	0	0	1	4
Northern Ontario (Sutherland)	2	0	0	2	2	1	0	2	4	1	2	0	16

Sheet C	1	2	3	4	5	6	7	8	9	10	11	12	Final
New Brunswick (Galloway)	0	0	2	1	1	0	1	0	1	1	2	2	11
Prince Edward Island (Cruikshank)	1	1	0	0	0	1	0	1	0	0	0	0	4

Sheet D	1	2	3	4	5	6	7	8	9	10	11	12	Final
British Columbia (Stone)	3	0	0	0	0	0	3	0	2	0	1	0	9
Manitoba (Watson)	0	1	1	1	2	2	0	3	0	2	0	2	14

Sheet E	1	2	3	4	5	6	7	8	9	10	11	12	Final
Nova Scotia (Webb)	0	2	1	1	1	1	0	1	0	2	5	0	14
Alberta (Beagle)	1	0	0	0	0	0	1	0	3	0	0	1	6
