= Howard Wood Sr. =

Canadian sportsman

Howard Wood
- Curler
- Born: August 29, 1888; Winnipeg, Manitoba
- Died: December 28, 1978 (aged 90); Winnipeg, Manitoba
Medal record
Representing Manitoba
Macdonald Brier
Gold medal – first place	1930 Toronto
Gold medal – first place	1932 Toronto
Gold medal – first place	1940 Winnipeg

Daniel John Howard "Pappy" Wood, Sr. (August 29, 1888 – December 28, 1978) was a Canadian curler.

Wood was the son of Daniel David Wood, and Katherine Wilson. His father was a brick manufacturer who immigrated from Bilston, England.

Wood played ice hockey, lacrosse and soccer, but is most notable for his curling achievements. In soccer, he helped Winnipeg Scottish FC win the Connaught Cup in 1915

One of Wood's most notable feats is participating in 71 straight Manitoba Curling Association Bonspiels (1908–1978), setting a Guinness World Record. He won the tournament eight of those 71 times. Wood won his first Brier in 1930, skipping the Manitoba rink which consisted of his brothers Vic (at second) and Lionel (at lead) and third Jim Congalton. The team finished the round robin at a 7–2 record, tied with Alberta. They defeated Alberta, skipped by Bob Munro in the final to claim the Brier.

Wood would win another Brier in 1932, throwing third stones for Congalton. Once again, the team finished tied for first with Alberta after the round robin. Once again, Manitoba prevailed, this time defeating Art Hallonquist's rink.

Wood won his final Brier in 1940, skipping the rink consisting of third Ernie Pollard, his son at second, Howie Wood, Jr., and lead Roy Enman. They finished the round robin undefeated, giving Wood his third Brier trophy, the first person to do so.

Wood would have skipped in his last Brier in 1945, but it was cancelled due to World War II.

Wood is a member of the Canadian Sports Hall of Fame, the Manitoba Sports Hall of Fame and the Canadian Curling Hall of Fame.

== Sources ==
- Manitoba Hall of Fame
