= Charles Jost Burchell =

Canadian diplomat

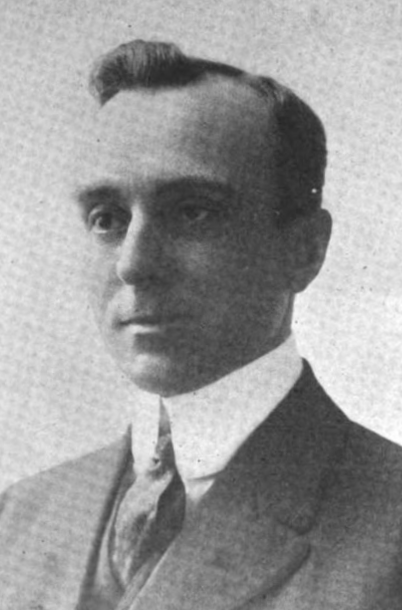

High Commissioner to the Dominion of Newfoundland
- In office 1941–1944
- In office 1948–1949

High Commissioner to Australia
- In office 1939–1941

Personal details
- Born: 1 July 1876 Sydney, Nova Scotia
- Died: 12 August 1967 (aged 91) Halifax, Nova Scotia
- Spouse: E. Gertrude Currie (m. 1901)
- Children: 4
- Education: Sydney Academy; Dalhousie University
- Occupation: Diplomat

Charles Jost Burchell, PC (1 July 1876 – 12 August 1967) was a Canadian diplomat. He served as Canada's first High Commissioner to Australia from 1939 to 1941 and as Canada's first and last High Commissioner to the Dominion of Newfoundland serving from 1941 to 1944 and again from 1948 to 1949.

Burchell also raised the possibility of the island, which was then ruled by a British appointed Commission of Government, might join Canadian Confederation following the war. He "quietly sounded out prominent St. John's citizens on Confederation and quietly encouraged St. John's lawyer John McEvoy to promote publicly Confederation between the two countries." Burchell concluded that the restoration of responsible government by Britain may have to occur before the island would consider joining Canada.

== Early life ==
Charles Jost Burchell was born in Sydney, Nova Scotia on 1 July 1876. He attended Sydney Academy and Dalhousie University, read law, and was admitted to the Nova Scotia bar in April 1899.

He married E. Gertrude Currie on 8 May 1901, and they had four children.

In December 1917, after the Halifax explosion, Burchell acted as counsel for the owners of the SS Imo during the inquiry in the Exchequer Court of Canada (and is portrayed by the actor Pete Postlethwaite in the 2003 TV series Shattered City).

A keen curler, Burchell represented Nova Scotia at the 1936 Macdonald Brier, Canada's men's curling championship, on a team skipped by Murray Macneill.

== Diplomatic career ==
Jost's initial term as High Commissioner was from 1941 to 1944 when he was succeeded by James Macdonald. However, he would serve a second sojourn from 1948 to 1949.

The mission remained following the war in order to deal with the withdrawal of American troops, negotiate a 99-year lease for a Canadian military airbase at Goose Bay and, ultimately, to negotiate Newfoundland's entry into Canadian Confederation following the 1948 Newfoundland referendums. Burchell was sent back to Newfoundland in 1948 in order to negotiate the British colony's terms of union with Canada.

The High Commission was closed on 31 March 1949, shortly before Newfoundland officially became a Canadian province. On 1 April 1949, Buchell was named to the King's Privy Council for Canada in recognition of his work as High Commissioner.

== Death ==
Charles Jost Burchell died at his home in Halifax on 14 August 1967.
