= Grant Watson =

Canadian curler

- Curler
- Born: October 31, 1905; Minnedosa, Manitoba
- Died: April 6, 1977 (aged 71); Thunder Bay, Ontario

Curling career
- Member Association: Manitoba (1935-1949); Northern Ontario (1952-1953)
Medal record
Representing Manitoba
Macdonald Brier
Gold medal – first place	1936 Toronto
Gold medal – first place	1942 Quebec City
Gold medal – first place	1949 Hamilton
Bronze medal – third place	1953 Sudbury

George Grant Watson (October 31, 1905 – April 6, 1977) was a Canadian curler. He was a member of the 1936, 1942 and 1949 Brier Champion teams (skipped by his older brother Ken Watson), playing as third, representing Manitoba. He also skipped Northern Ontario at the 1953 Macdonald Brier, leading his team of Don McEwen, Frank Sargent, and Archie Grant to a 7–3 record.
