= 1930 Macdonald Brier =

Canadian men's curling championship

- Host city: Toronto, Ontario
- Arena: Granite Curling Club
- Dates: February 25–28
- Winner: Manitoba
- Curling club: Granite CC, Winnipeg
- Skip: Howard Wood, Sr.
- Third: Jim Congalton
- Second: Vic Wood
- Lead: Lionel Wood
- Finalist: Alberta (Bobby Munro)

The 1930 Macdonald Brier, the Canadian men's national curling championship, was held from February 25 to 28, 1930 at the Granite Club in Toronto, Ontario.

Alberta and Manitoba both finished round robin play with 7-2 records necessitating a tiebreaker playoff to determine the Brier champion. In the playoff, Team Manitoba, which was skipped by Howard "Pappy" Wood, Sr. would defeat Alberta 12–9 to capture Manitoba's third straight Brier Tankard. Howard's brothers, Vic and Lionel became the first siblings to win the Brier.

== Teams ==
The teams are listed as follows:

Alberta	Manitoba	Montreal	New Brunswick	Northern Ontario
Edmonton CC, Edmonton Skip: Bobby Munro; Third: Whit Matthews; Second: Donald Edwards; Lead: Jack Hall	Granite CC, Winnipeg Skip: Howard Wood, Sr. Third: Jim Congalton; Second: Vic Wood; Lead: Lionel Wood	Montreal GCA, Montreal Skip: Peter Lyall; Third: Ormiston Roy; Second: Howard Stewart; Lead: Harry Walker	St. Stephen CC, St. Stephen Skip: Art McWha; Third: Bruce Buchanan; Second: Hardy Ganong; Lead: Evans Hill	Chapleau CC, Chapleau Skip: Albert Tobey; Third: Frank Muirhead; Second: Bob Morrison; Lead: David Moore
Nova Scotia	Ontario	Quebec	Saskatchewan	Toronto
Halifax CC, Halifax Skip: Murray MacNeill; Third: Al MacInnes; Second: Jim Donahoe; Lead: J.M. Murphy	Stratford CC, Stratford Skip: H.A. Bruce; Third: M.W. Binkley; Second: M.A. Humber; Lead: J.W. Lloyd	Huntingdon CC, Huntingdon Skip: John Darby; Third: Harold Reid; Second: Arthur Lunan; Lead: Chester Oney	Granite CC, Saskatoon Skip: Bob McLeod; Third: Bill McArter; Second: Rube Watts; Lead: Al Scollon	Kitchener Granite CC, Kitchener Skip: Russ Hall; Third: Lloyd Cooke; Second: Perry Hall; Lead: Jack English

== Round Robin standings ==
Key
Teams to Tiebreaker

Team	Skip	W	L	PF	PA
Manitoba	Howard Wood, Sr.	7	2	108	77
Alberta	Rob Munro	7	2	98	82
Toronto	Russ Hall	5	4	87	82
Nova Scotia	Murray MacNeill	4	5	94	95
New Brunswick	Art McWha	4	5	88	92
Montreal	Peter Lyall	4	5	88	93
Saskatchewan	Bob McLeod	4	5	102	85
Quebec	John Darby	4	5	83	102
Ontario	H.A. Bruce	3	6	76	101
Northern Ontario	Albert Tobey	3	6	80	95

== Round Robin results ==
=== Draw 1 ===
Sheet A	1	2	3	4	5	6	7	8	9	10	11	12	Final
Quebec (Darby)	2	1	0	0	2	0	0	2	0	1	1	2	11
Montreal (Lyall)	0	0	2	1	0	3	2	0	2	0	0	0	10

Sheet B	1	2	3	4	5	6	7	8	9	10	11	12	Final
Alberta (Munro)	1	2	0	0	2	1	2	0	1	2	0	0	11
Toronto (Hall)	0	0	1	2	0	0	0	5	0	0	1	1	10

Sheet C	1	2	3	4	5	6	7	8	9	10	11	12	Final
Northern Ontario (Tobey)	0	2	2	0	0	1	1	0	0	1	2	1	10
New Brunswick (McWha)	2	0	0	1	2	0	0	1	1	0	0	0	7

Sheet D	1	2	3	4	5	6	7	8	9	10	11	12	Final
Manitoba (Wood)	0	0	3	2	3	1	0	0	1	0	0	1	11
Ontario (Bruce)	2	1	0	0	0	0	2	1	0	1	1	0	8

Sheet E	1	2	3	4	5	6	7	8	9	10	11	12	Final
Nova Scotia (Macneill)	0	1	1	2	1	2	0	2	0	3	1	1	14
Saskatchewan (McLeod)	4	0	0	0	0	0	1	0	1	0	0	0	6

=== Draw 2 ===
Sheet A	1	2	3	4	5	6	7	8	9	10	11	12	Final
Quebec (Darby)	3	2	0	2	0	2	1	0	0	0	0	1	11
Northern Ontario (Tobey)	0	0	3	0	1	0	0	1	1	3	1	0	10

Sheet B	1	2	3	4	5	6	7	8	9	10	11	12	Final
Alberta (Munro)	1	0	0	1	0	3	0	1	0	2	1	2	11
Manitoba (Wood)	0	2	3	0	1	0	2	0	1	0	0	0	9

Sheet C	1	2	3	4	5	6	7	8	9	10	11	12	Final
New Brunswick (McWha)	3	0	2	1	1	1	0	0	0	2	0	1	11
Toronto (Hall)	0	1	0	0	0	0	3	1	1	0	2	0	8

Sheet D	1	2	3	4	5	6	7	8	9	10	11	12	Final
Ontario (Bruce)	3	0	2	0	3	0	2	1	0	1	0	3	15
Nova Scotia (Macneill)	0	1	0	2	0	2	0	0	2	0	2	0	9

Sheet E	1	2	3	4	5	6	7	8	9	10	11	12	Final
Montreal (Lyall)	0	1	0	1	0	0	3	3	1	2	0	1	12
Saskatchewan (McLeod)	1	0	2	0	3	3	0	0	0	0	2	0	11

=== Draw 3 ===
Sheet A	1	2	3	4	5	6	7	8	9	10	11	12	Final
Alberta (Munro)	1	0	2	0	2	2	1	0	2	1	1	0	12
Nova Scotia (Macneill)	0	1	0	2	0	0	0	3	0	0	0	1	7

Sheet B	1	2	3	4	5	6	7	8	9	10	11	12	Final
Montreal (Lyall)	1	2	0	1	0	1	1	0	2	0	2	0	10
Ontario (Bruce)	0	0	2	0	1	0	0	1	0	3	0	1	8

Sheet C	1	2	3	4	5	6	7	8	9	10	11	12	Final
Manitoba (Wood)	0	1	0	1	0	0	3	1	1	0	3	1	11
Northern Ontario (Tobey)	2	0	1	0	1	2	0	0	0	3	0	0	9

Sheet D	1	2	3	4	5	6	7	8	9	10	11	12	Final
Toronto (Hall)	0	2	0	1	0	1	0	0	5	0	1	0	10
Quebec (Darby)	1	0	1	0	1	0	2	1	0	1	0	1	8

Sheet E	1	2	3	4	5	6	7	8	9	10	11	12	Final
Saskatchewan (McLeod)	0	0	0	0	2	3	2	0	0	2	4	2	15
New Brunswick (McWha)	2	2	1	1	0	0	0	2	1	0	0	0	9

=== Draw 4 ===
Sheet A	1	2	3	4	5	6	7	8	9	10	11	12	Final
Alberta (Munro)	2	1	1	1	0	0	0	1	0	1	1	0	8
Northern Ontario (Tobey)	0	0	0	0	1	1	1	0	1	0	0	0	4

Sheet B	1	2	3	4	5	6	7	8	9	10	11	12	Final
Montreal (Lyall)	2	0	1	0	1	1	0	1	0	1	0	1	8
Nova Scotia (Macneill)	0	1	0	1	0	0	2	0	2	0	1	0	7

Sheet C	1	2	3	4	5	6	7	8	9	10	11	12	Final
Manitoba (Wood)	0	2	4	1	0	1	0	1	1	0	1	0	11
Toronto (Hall)	1	0	0	0	1	0	1	0	0	1	0	1	5

Sheet D	1	2	3	4	5	6	7	8	9	10	11	12	Final
Saskatchewan (McLeod)	3	1	0	1	2	1	2	1	1	0	2	2	16
Ontario (Bruce)	0	0	1	0	0	0	0	0	0	1	0	0	2

Sheet E	1	2	3	4	5	6	7	8	9	10	11	12	Final
New Brunswick (McWha)	1	2	1	0	1	1	0	1	1	1	4	1	14
Quebec (Darby)	0	0	0	1	0	0	1	0	0	0	0	0	2

=== Draw 5 ===
Sheet A	1	2	3	4	5	6	7	8	9	10	11	12	Final
Alberta (Munro)	2	0	0	3	0	1	2	0	1	0	1	2	12
New Brunswick (McWha)	0	1	1	0	1	0	0	1	0	3	0	0	7

Sheet B	1	2	3	4	5	6	7	8	9	10	11	12	Final
Saskatchewan (McLeod)	2	2	0	5	2	1	1	2	0	0	0	X	15
Manitoba (Wood)	0	0	2	0	0	0	0	0	2	2	1	X	7

Sheet C	1	2	3	4	5	6	7	8	9	10	11	12	Final
Quebec (Darby)	1	0	1	0	3	0	1	2	0	1	0	0	9
Ontario (Bruce)	0	2	0	1	0	1	0	0	1	0	1	1	7

Sheet D	1	2	3	4	5	6	7	8	9	10	11	12	Final
Toronto (Hall)	2	1	0	2	0	0	4	0	1	0	1	0	11
Montreal (Lyall)	0	0	3	0	2	1	0	2	0	1	0	1	10

Sheet E	1	2	3	4	5	6	7	8	9	10	11	12	Final
Nova Scotia (Macneill)	2	0	1	0	3	0	2	2	1	1	1	1	14
Northern Ontario (Tobey)	0	4	0	2	0	1	0	0	0	0	0	0	7

=== Draw 6 ===
Sheet A	1	2	3	4	5	6	7	8	9	10	11	12	Final
Alberta (Munro)	2	2	0	0	3	0	0	2	0	2	1	1	13
Ontario (Bruce)	0	0	1	1	0	2	2	0	2	0	0	0	8

Sheet B	1	2	3	4	5	6	7	8	9	10	11	12	Final
Manitoba (Wood)	2	2	3	0	3	1	1	0	2	0	0	0	14
Montreal (Lyall)	0	0	0	2	0	0	0	1	0	2	1	1	7

Sheet C	1	2	3	4	5	6	7	8	9	10	11	12	Final
Toronto (Hall)	1	2	0	3	0	0	3	1	1	2	0	1	14
Northern Ontario (Tobey)	0	0	4	0	1	1	0	0	0	0	1	0	7

Sheet D	1	2	3	4	5	6	7	8	9	10	11	12	Final
Saskatchewan (McLeod)	1	0	1	0	2	0	4	0	1	1	2	0	12
Quebec (Darby)	0	2	0	1	0	1	0	2	0	0	0	1	7

Sheet E	1	2	3	4	5	6	7	8	9	10	11	12	Final
Nova Scotia (Macneill)	0	0	2	3	0	2	0	2	1	2	0	1	13
New Brunswick (McWha)	1	1	0	0	2	0	2	0	0	0	2	0	8

=== Draw 7 ===
Sheet A	1	2	3	4	5	6	7	8	9	10	11	12	Final
Toronto (Hall)	0	2	0	1	0	3	0	2	0	0	1	2	11
Nova Scotia (Macneill)	1	0	1	0	1	0	1	0	2	1	0	0	7

Sheet B	1	2	3	4	5	6	7	8	9	10	11	12	Final
Montreal (Lyall)	0	0	0	3	2	1	0	2	2	0	1	0	11
Alberta (Munro)	2	1	3	0	0	0	1	0	0	1	0	1	9

Sheet C	1	2	3	4	5	6	7	8	9	10	11	12	Final
Manitoba (Wood)	0	2	2	3	3	2	1	0	1	0	0	0	14
Quebec (Darby)	1	0	0	0	0	0	0	1	0	2	2	2	8

Sheet D	1	2	3	4	5	6	7	8	9	10	11	12	Final
New Brunswick (McWha)	1	2	0	0	1	0	4	1	2	1	1	0	13
Ontario (Bruce)	0	0	2	2	0	1	0	0	0	0	0	1	6

Sheet E	1	2	3	4	5	6	7	8	9	10	11	12	Final
Northern Ontario (Tobey)	1	0	0	4	1	1	0	2	1	0	0	1	11
Saskatchewan (McLeod)	0	1	1	0	0	0	2	0	0	3	1	0	8

=== Draw 8 ===
Sheet A	1	2	3	4	5	6	7	8	9	10	11	12	Final
Alberta (Munro)	2	0	4	0	2	2	1	0	0	0	2	0	13
Saskatchewan (McLeod)	0	1	0	2	0	0	0	3	1	1	0	3	11

Sheet B	1	2	3	4	5	6	7	8	9	10	11	12	Final
Manitoba (Wood)	3	2	2	0	2	0	2	0	2	2	0	0	15
New Brunswick (McWha)	0	0	0	3	0	1	0	1	0	0	1	1	7

Sheet C	1	2	3	4	5	6	7	8	9	10	11	12	Final
Nova Scotia (Macneill)	0	4	1	0	0	4	0	4	0	0	3	0	16
Quebec (Darby)	1	0	0	1	2	0	1	0	3	3	0	1	12

Sheet D	1	2	3	4	5	6	7	8	9	10	11	12	13	Final
Ontario (Bruce)	1	0	0	1	0	1	1	1	0	3	0	0	1	9
Toronto (Hall)	0	2	1	0	1	0	0	0	2	0	1	1	0	8

Sheet E	1	2	3	4	5	6	7	8	9	10	11	12	Final
Northern Ontario (Tobey)	2	0	0	1	0	1	1	1	0	1	1	2	10
Montreal (Lyall)	0	3	1	0	3	0	0	0	2	0	0	0	9

=== Draw 9 ===
Sheet A	1	2	3	4	5	6	7	8	9	10	11	12	Final
Quebec (Darby)	0	5	0	0	1	1	2	3	0	2	1	0	15
Alberta (Munro)	2	0	4	1	0	0	0	0	1	0	0	1	9

Sheet B	1	2	3	4	5	6	7	8	9	10	11	12	Final
Manitoba (Wood)	0	1	3	3	1	3	1	0	1	2	1	0	16
Nova Scotia (Macneill)	2	0	0	0	0	0	0	1	0	0	0	4	7

Sheet C	1	2	3	4	5	6	7	8	9	10	11	12	Final
Ontario (Bruce)	0	0	3	4	0	1	0	2	1	0	1	1	13
Northern Ontario (Tobey)	3	4	0	0	1	0	1	0	0	3	0	0	12

Sheet D	1	2	3	4	5	6	7	8	9	10	11	12	Final
Toronto (Hall)	1	1	0	1	0	0	1	0	3	0	3	0	10
Saskatchewan (McLeod)	0	0	1	0	1	1	0	2	0	1	0	2	8

Sheet E	1	2	3	4	5	6	7	8	9	10	11	12	Final
New Brunswick (McWha)	0	3	1	0	2	0	0	4	0	1	1	0	12
Montreal (Lyall)	1	0	0	1	0	1	2	0	2	0	0	4	11

== Tiebreaker ==
Sheet A	1	2	3	4	5	6	7	8	9	10	11	12	Final
Manitoba (Wood)	3	0	1	2	0	2	0	1	1	0	2	0	12
Alberta (Munro)	0	1	0	0	2	0	3	0	0	1	0	2	9
