= Ab Gowanlock =

Canadian curler

- Curler
- Born: December 14, 1900; Glenboro, Manitoba
- Died: September 27, 1988 (aged 87); Dauphin, Manitoba
Medal record
Representing Manitoba
Macdonald Brier
Gold medal – first place	1938 Toronto
Gold medal – first place	1953 Sudbury

Albert (Ab) Adam "Spats" Gowanlock (December 14, 1900 – September 27, 1988) was a Canadian curler from Manitoba.

Gowanlock was a two-time provincial and two-time Brier champion.

Gowanlock began curling in his hometown of Glenboro, Manitoba. Gowanlock and his rink of E. C. "Bung" Cartwell, Bill McKnight and Tom McKnight became the first team from rural Manitoba to win the Brier in 1938.

Gowanlock would later move to Dauphin, Manitoba where he worked for the Manitoba Department of Highways. He would win a second Brier in 1953 with teammates Jim Williams, Art Pollon and Russ Jackman. Gowanlock was 52 when he won the Brier, and is currently to-date the oldest Brier winning skip in history.

Gowanlock won four Manitoba Curling Association Bonspiels in his career, and played in 57 consecutive tournaments. He was inducted to the Manitoba Sports Hall of Fame in 1984. He died in 1988.
