= Harry Scott (ice hockey) =

Canadian ice hockey player

- Born: June 2, 1885 Moncton, New Brunswick
- Died: October 22, 1954 (aged 69)
- Height: 5 ft 10 in (178 cm)
- Weight: 180 lb (82 kg; 12 st 12 lb)
- Position: Centre
- Shot: Right
- Played for: Toronto Ontarios; Montreal Canadiens; Moncton Victorias
- Playing career: 1905–1923

William Henry Scott (June 2, 1885 – October 22, 1954) was a Canadian professional ice hockey player who played 110 games in various professional and amateur leagues, including the National Hockey Association. Amongst the teams he for played with were the Toronto Ontarios and Montreal Canadiens.

== Early life ==
Scott was born in Moncton, New Brunswick.

== Career ==
=== Ice hockey ===
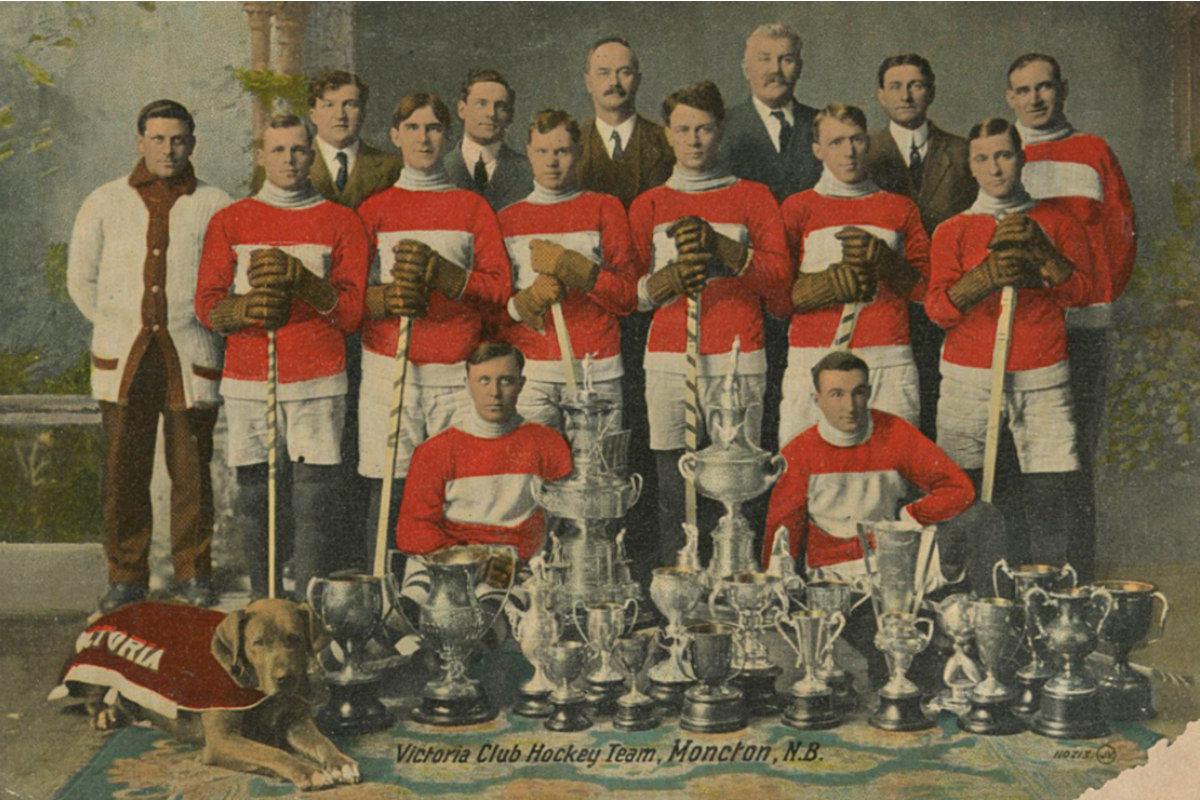
Scott, second standing redshirted player from left, with the Moncton Victorias in 1912–13.

Scott played on the 1906 Portage la Prairie Cities in the Manitoba Professional Hockey League, and was a teammate to Toby Sexsmith. During the 1910–11 and 1912–13 seasons Scott played for his home town club Moncton Victorias.

Scott later played with two National Hockey Association teams, the Toronto Ontarios in 1913–1914, and the Montreal Canadiens in 1913–1914 and 1914–1915. In those two years, he played alongside six future members of the Hockey Hall of Fame, including Georges Vezina and Newsy Lalonde.

=== Curling ===
He took up curling and in 1932 was lead on the 1932 Alberta Curling Championship team. That team went to the 1932 Macdonald Brier in Toronto and ended as runner up to Manitoba with a 5 and 3 record. Other members of the team were Arthur Hallonquist, Skip, William Morrison, Third, J. Johnson, Second, and Harry Scott, Lead. They played out of the Three Hills Curling Club.

=== Journalism ===
After his hockey career ended, Scott moved to Calgary and took a job as a sports writer on the Calgary Albertan. He eventually ended up as sports editor of the paper.

The Scott–Mamini Award, initiated by the Calgary Press-Radio-TV Sports Club in 1958, was presented annually to the city’s Athlete of the Year as chosen by the media. That format continued until 1987 when the Scott–Mamini Award became the Male Athlete of the Year recognition. It was named for Scott and Bob Mamini, the Sports Department Head at the Calgary Herald. Both men were highly respected across the country during the 1930s and 1940s.

In 1958, goaltender Al Rollins was the first recipient of the Scott-Mamini Award in the sport of hockey. Since that time, five other goalies have been honoured, including three Calgary Flames goalies, Reggie Lemelin (1984), Mike Vernon (1989 and 1998) and Miikka Kiprusoff (2007). Others recognized in the sport of hockey include Doug Barkley (1962), John Davidson (1972), Joe Nieuwendyk (1988) and Jarome Iginla (2002 and 2003).

== See also ==
- Sport in Calgary
