= Carl Battell =

Canadian ice hockey player

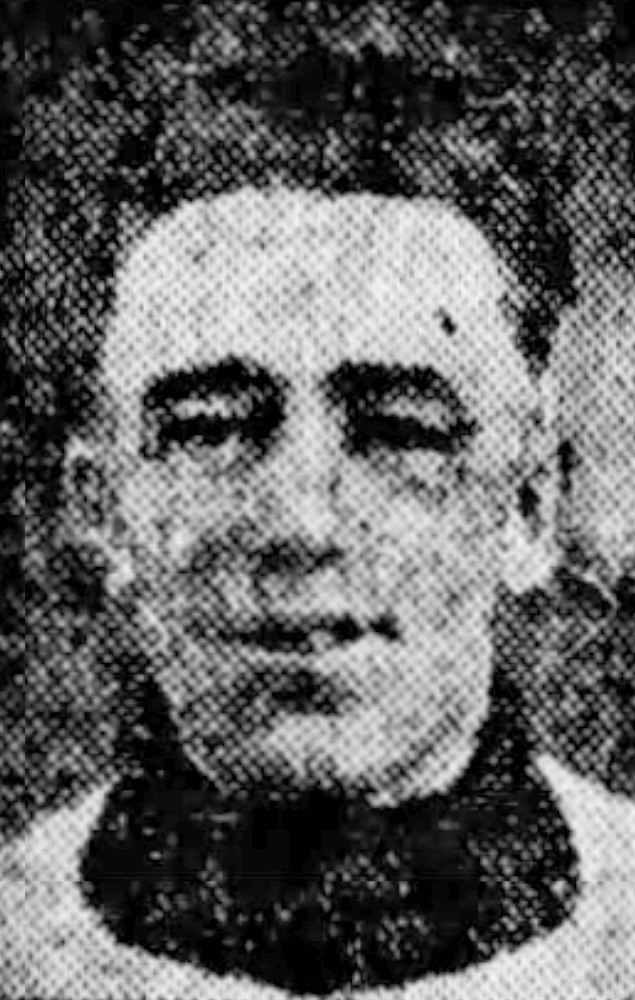
- Battell with Regina Capitals
- Born: May 28, 1893; Moose Jaw, Saskatchewan, Canada
- Died: January 31, 1988 (aged 94); Moose Jaw, Saskatchewan, Canada
- Height: 5 ft 11 in (180 cm)
- Weight: 170 lb (77 kg; 12 st 2 lb)
- Position: Centre
- Shot: Left
- Played for: Regina Capitals
- Playing career: 1911–1922

Carlton Edward Battell (May 28, 1893 – January 31, 1988) was a Canadian professional ice hockey player. He played with the Regina Capitals of the Western Canada Hockey League. Previously, he played with in his hometown the Moose Jaw Moose and Moose Jaw Maple Leafs. He also tried out for the Vancouver Millionaires unsuccessfully in 1917. He was later a referee in the American Hockey Association.

Battell was also a prominent rugby player and curler. He represented Saskatchewan at the 1932 Macdonald Brier.
