= 1927 Macdonald Brier =

1927 Macdonald Brier Tankard
- Host city: Toronto, Ontario
- Arena: Granite Club, Toronto
- Dates: March 1–3
- Winner: Nova Scotia
- Curling club: Halifax CC, Halifax
- Skip: Murray MacNeill
- Third: Al MacInnes
- Second: Cliff Torey
- Lead: Jim Donahoe

The 1927 Macdonald Brier Tankard, the Canadian men's national curling championship, was held March 1–3 at the Granite Club in Toronto. This edition of the Brier would be the first, with it also being the first time it was hosted in Ontario, and the first time it was hosted in Toronto's Granite Club.

Murray MacNeill, skip of the Nova Scotia champion Halifax rink, would win the inaugural tournament, leading his rink of skips (his original team couldn't make the trip) to victory.

The event began with an opening banquet with Ontario Lieutenant Governor William Donald Ross and Ontario Premier Howard Ferguson welcoming players.

== Event summary ==
After successful trips by the winner of the Manitoba Bonspiel in 1925 and their participation in the Quebec Bonspiel being deemed popular enough to consider a national tournament in 1926, the Stewart brothers of Macdonald Tobacco would sponsor what would become the Brier in 1927. Played at the Granite Club in Toronto, the tournament would feature teams from four provinces, two cities, and a representative from Western Canada and Northern Ontario, the latter becoming a fixture at the Brier. It would be the only Brier that would have all games go 14 ends (with two games going to a 15th end to break ties).

== Teams ==
The teams are listed as follows:

Montreal	New Brunswick	Northern Ontario	Nova Scotia
Granite CA, Montreal Skip: Peter Lyall; Third: Willie Brown; Second: Howard Stewart; Lead: Bruce Stewart	Saint John Composite Rink (Note: Malcolm curled out of the Thistle Curling Club in Saint John, Beatteay out of the St. Andrews Curling Club in Saint John, Shives out of the Campbellton Curling Club (Campbellton) and MacKay out of the Bathurst Curling Club (Bathurst)) Skip: Johnny Malcolm; Third: Fred Beatteay; Second: Reg Shives; Lead: Elbridge MacKay	Haileybury CC, Haileybury Skip: Emmett Smith; Third: Dunc Sutherland; Second: Dan Millar; Lead: Mel Hunt	Halifax CC, Halifax Skip: Murray MacNeill; Third: Al MacInnes; Second: Cliff Torey; Lead: Jim Donahoe
Ontario	Quebec	Saskatchewan (Western Canada)	Toronto
Sarnia CC, Sarnia Skip: Robert MacKenzie; Third: Bill Watson; Second: Mel Hunt; Lead: Harry Watson	Quebec CC, Quebec City Skip: Major Robert Whyte; Third: Robert Morton; Second: Malcolm Holliday; Lead: Joe Power	Yellow Grass CC, Yellow Grass, SK Skip: Oswald Barkwell; Third: Alf Hill; Second: Hector Hay; Lead: Pete Wilken	High Park CC, Toronto Skip: William Scott; Third: Ed Peaker; Second: Thomas Wright; Lead: Fred Lucas

== Map of teams ==
Provincial Winners

== Round-robin standings ==
Key
Brier champion

Team	Skip	W	L	PF	PA	EW	EL	BE
Nova Scotia	Murray Macneill	6	1	93	66	53	41	1
New Brunswick	Johnny Malcolm	5	2	93	74	53	44	0
Toronto	William Scott	4	3	90	81	51	48	0
Saskatchewan	Oswald Barkwell (Note: The Oswald Barkwell rink represented all of Western Canada in this tournament, but were from Saskatchewan.)	3	4	84	82	47	48	2
Ontario	Robert MacKenzie	3	4	87	88	46	51	0
Northern Ontario	Emmett Smith	3	4	62	85	44	53	1
Quebec	Major Robert Whyte	2	5	68	84	46	51	1
Montreal	Peter Lyall	2	5	71	88	45	49	3

== Round-robin results ==
=== Draw 1 ===
Tuesday, March 1 (Morning)

Sheet A	1	2	3	4	5	6	7	8	9	10	11	12	13	14	Final
Quebec (Whyte)	1	0	1	0	0	2	0	0	3	1	0	0	0	2	10
Nova Scotia (Macneill)	0	1	0	1	2	0	3	2	0	0	0	2	2	0	13

Sheet B	1	2	3	4	5	6	7	8	9	10	11	12	13	14	Final
New Brunswick (Malcolm)	2	1	0	1	0	0	0	1	0	0	1	0	2	1	9
Toronto (Scott)	0	0	3	0	2	1	2	0	1	1	0	1	0	0	11

Sheet C	1	2	3	4	5	6	7	8	9	10	11	12	13	14	Final
Montreal (Lyall)	3	0	0	0	3	0	2	3	2	0	1	1	0	0	15
Northern Ontario (Smith)	0	2	2	1	0	1	0	0	0	1	0	0	2	0	9

Sheet D	1	2	3	4	5	6	7	8	9	10	11	12	13	14	Final
Ontario (MacKenzie)	1	0	3	0	3	0	0	0	1	0	2	0	1	2	13
Saskatchewan (Barkwell)	0	1	0	2	0	2	1	2	0	1	0	3	0	0	12

=== Draw 2 ===
Tuesday, March 1 (afternoon)

Sheet A	1	2	3	4	5	6	7	8	9	10	11	12	13	14	Final
Montreal (Lyall)	0	1	0	0	1	1	0	1	0	1	0	3	0	0	8
Saskatchewan (Barkwell)	4	0	2	0	0	0	1	0	1	0	1	0	4	0	13

Sheet B	1	2	3	4	5	6	7	8	9	10	11	12	13	14	Final
Northern Ontario (Smith)	2	0	1	0	2	0	0	0	1	0	2	0	1	1	10
Ontario (MacKenzie)	0	2	0	2	0	1	1	1	0	1	0	1	0	0	9

Sheet C	1	2	3	4	5	6	7	8	9	10	11	12	13	14	Final
New Brunswick (Malcolm)	4	0	0	1	0	1	0	0	2	1	0	2	0	4	15
Nova Scotia (Macneill)	0	2	1	0	1	0	1	3	0	0	4	0	2	0	14

Sheet D	1	2	3	4	5	6	7	8	9	10	11	12	13	14	Final
Quebec (Whyte)	0	1	0	0	0	0	0	2	0	0	1	1	0	0	5
Toronto (Scott)	1	0	1	3	1	1	2	0	1	2	0	0	1	2	15

=== Draw 3 ===
Wednesday, March 2 (morning)

Sheet A	1	2	3	4	5	6	7	8	9	10	11	12	13	14	Final
Quebec (Whyte)	0	1	1	0	1	0	0	2	2	0	2	1	1	3	14
Montreal (Lyall)	1	0	0	1	0	2	1	0	0	3	0	0	0	0	8

Sheet B	1	2	3	4	5	6	7	8	9	10	11	12	13	14	Final
New Brunswick (Malcolm)	1	1	2	1	0	3	3	0	2	1	2	0	0	0	16
Ontario (MacKenzie)	0	0	0	0	3	0	0	1	0	0	0	2	3	1	10

Sheet C	1	2	3	4	5	6	7	8	9	10	11	12	13	14	Final
Saskatchewan (Barkwell)	1	2	0	5	0	1	1	0	3	0	0	4	0	0	17
Toronto (Scott)	0	0	4	0	4	0	0	1	0	1	1	0	2	2	15

Sheet D	1	2	3	4	5	6	7	8	9	10	11	12	13	14	Final
Northern Ontario (Smith)	0	0	0	0	1	0	1	1	0	0	1	0	X	X	4
Nova Scotia (Macneill)	1	1	1	2	0	5	0	0	2	1	0	1	X	X	14

=== Draw 4 ===
Wednesday, March 2 (afternoon)

Sheet A	1	2	3	4	5	6	7	8	9	10	11	12	13	14	15	Final
Northern Ontario (Smith)	1	2	1	1	0	2	0	0	0	1	1	0	0	1	1	11
Toronto (Scott)	0	0	0	0	2	0	1	4	1	0	0	1	1	0	0	10

Sheet B	1	2	3	4	5	6	7	8	9	10	11	12	13	14	Final
Saskatchewan (Barkwell)	0	0	0	0	0	3	0	1	2	0	3	0	0	X	9
Nova Scotia (Macneill)	2	1	1	2	1	0	2	0	0	1	0	1	1	X	12

Sheet C	1	2	3	4	5	6	7	8	9	10	11	12	13	14	Final
Quebec (Whyte)	0	6	0	1	0	1	1	0	0	2	1	0	1	0	13
Ontario (MacKenzie)	1	0	1	0	4	0	0	1	3	0	0	2	0	3	15

Sheet D	1	2	3	4	5	6	7	8	9	10	11	12	13	14	Final
New Brunswick (Malcolm)	0	0	0	2	1	0	3	1	0	1	1	0	0	1	10
Montreal (Lyall)	2	1	3	0	0	1	0	0	2	0	0	3	1	0	13

=== Draw 5 ===
Wednesday, March 2 (evening)

Sheet A	1	2	3	4	5	6	7	8	9	10	11	12	13	14	Final
Nova Scotia (Macneill)	2	0	0	0	0	2	0	3	0	3	2	0	2	0	14
Toronto (Scott)	0	2	1	1	2	0	1	0	1	0	0	1	0	1	10

Sheet B	1	2	3	4	5	6	7	8	9	10	11	12	13	14	Final
Quebec (Whyte)	2	0	1	0	1	0	0	1	0	0	0	0	0	X	5
New Brunswick (Malcolm)	0	2	0	1	0	1	2	0	2	2	1	1	1	X	13

Sheet C	1	2	3	4	5	6	7	8	9	10	11	12	13	14	Final
Montreal (Lyall)	1	0	1	2	0	0	0	1	0	1	0	2	0	X	8
Ontario (MacKenzie)	0	3	0	0	5	2	1	0	2	0	1	0	2	X	16

Sheet D	1	2	3	4	5	6	7	8	9	10	11	12	13	14	Final
Saskatchewan (Barkwell)	0	1	0	1	1	2	0	1	1	0	1	2	1	0	11
Northern Ontario (Smith)	1	0	1	0	0	0	3	0	0	1	0	0	0	3	9

=== Draw 6 ===
Thursday, March 3 (morning)

Sheet A	1	2	3	4	5	6	7	8	9	10	11	12	13	14	Final
Saskatchewan (Barkwell)	1	0	1	1	0	2	1	1	0	3	0	3	0	0	13
New Brunswick (Malcolm)	0	1	0	0	2	0	0	0	1	0	5	0	3	2	14

Sheet B	1	2	3	4	5	6	7	8	9	10	11	12	13	14	Final
Montreal (Lyall)	3	1	1	2	1	0	0	0	0	0	0	1	0	0	9
Nova Scotia (Macneill)	0	0	0	0	0	2	1	2	2	2	2	0	1	1	13

Sheet C	1	2	3	4	5	6	7	8	9	10	11	12	13	14	Final
Ontario (MacKenzie)	2	2	0	0	0	0	2	0	0	4	0	3	1	1	15
Toronto (Scott)	0	0	5	1	3	1	0	2	2	0	2	0	0	0	16

Sheet D	1	2	3	4	5	6	7	8	9	10	11	12	13	14	15	Final
Quebec (Whyte)	0	0	0	1	2	1	1	2	1	1	0	1	0	0	0	10
Northern Ontario (Smith)	2	2	1	0	0	0	0	0	0	0	2	0	2	1	1	11

=== Draw 7 ===
Thursday, March 3 (afternoon)

Sheet A	1	2	3	4	5	6	7	8	9	10	11	12	13	14	Final
Quebec (Whyte)	3	2	1	0	1	1	0	1	0	0	1	0	0	1	11
Saskatchewan (Barkwell)	0	0	0	1	0	0	1	0	3	1	0	2	1	0	9

Sheet B	1	2	3	4	5	6	7	8	9	10	11	12	13	14	Final
Ontario (MacKenzie)	0	0	0	1	0	0	1	0	0	4	1	0	1	1	9
Nova Scotia (Macneill)	2	2	1	0	1	2	0	2	1	0	0	2	0	0	13

Sheet C	1	2	3	4	5	6	7	8	9	10	11	12	13	14	Final
Montreal (Lyall)	2	0	0	1	0	2	0	0	1	1	0	1	1	1	10
Toronto (Scott)	0	2	1	0	4	0	1	3	0	0	2	0	0	0	13

Sheet D	1	2	3	4	5	6	7	8	9	10	11	12	13	14	Final
New Brunswick (Malcolm)	0	2	0	3	0	0	1	1	0	3	1	0	2	3	16
Northern Ontario (Smith)	2	0	1	0	2	1	0	0	1	0	0	1	0	0	8

== Team selection ==
Teams were chosen by invitation. Many provinces had yet to have provincial championships.

- Western Canada: Winners of the "Macdonald Brier event" playoff between Manitoba and Saskatchewan.
- Nova Scotia: "Four best players (in the province)." Macneill was chosen as winner of the Johnson Cup.
- Montreal: Amalgamation rink, selected by the Granite Association of Montreal
- Northern Ontario: Winners of the Grand Aggregate of the Northern Curling Association bonspiel
- Ontario: A selection of the winners of the Ontario Tankard
- Toronto: Winners of the Canada Life trophy.
- Quebec: Winners of the Quebec Bonspiel.
- New Brunswick: Selected by the New Brunswick Curling Association.
