= 1932 Macdonald Brier =

Canadian curling event

- Host city: Toronto, Ontario
- Arena: Granite Curling Club
- Dates: March 1–3
- Winner: Manitoba
- Curling club: Granite CC, Winnipeg
- Skip: Jim Congalton
- Third: Howard Wood, Sr.
- Second: William Noble
- Lead: Harry Mawhinney
- Finalist: Alberta (Art Hallonquist)

The 1932 Macdonald Brier, the Canadian men's national curling championship, was held from March 1 to 3, 1932 at the Granite Club in Toronto, Ontario.

Owing to their poor performances (especially Montreal), and a need to have a more "national" event, the separate Montreal and Toronto teams were eliminated prior to the 1932 Brier. The field was thus reduced to 8 teams, seven provinces plus Northern Ontario. This arrangement lasted until 1936 when British Columbia and Prince Edward Island were added to the field.

Both Team Alberta and Team Manitoba finished round robin play tied with 5-2 records, necessitating a tiebreaker playoff between those two teams for the Brier championship. Team Manitoba, which was skipped by Jim Congalton defeated Alberta in the playoff 13-8 to capture the Brier Tankard. This was the second time in three years that Manitoba defeated Alberta in a playoff. This was also Manitoba's fifth consecutive Brier championship. As of 2024, this is still a record for most consecutive Brier wins by a province.

This was the second consecutive Brier and the most recent Brier to date to have no blank ends.

== Teams ==
The teams are listed as follows:

Alberta	Manitoba	New Brunswick	Northern Ontario
Three Hills CC, Three Hills Skip: Art Hallonquist; Third: Bill Morrison; Second: Jack Johnson; Lead: Harry Scott	Granite CC, Winnipeg Skip: Jimmy Congalton; Third: Howard Wood, Sr. Second: Bill Noble; Lead: Harry Mawhinney	Bathurst CC, Bathurst Skip: Nicholas Thibodeau; Third: Joseph Connolly; Second: Daniel Connolly; Lead: John Kennah	New Liskeard CC, New Liskeard Skip: A.E. Stephenson; Third: R.W. Thompson; Second: Charles Binkley; Lead: Jack McKinlay
Nova Scotia	Ontario	Quebec	Saskatchewan
Halifax CC, Halifax Skip: Murray Macneill; Third: Clifford Torey; Second: Jim Donahoe; Lead: F.O. Robertson	The Granite Club, Toronto Skip: Charles Bulley; Third: John Brandon; Second: Thomas Black; Lead: C.W. Dufoe	Caledonia CC, Montreal Skip: Peter Lyall; Third: A.R. Vallance; Second: Howard Stewart; Lead: E.G. Graves	Moose Jaw CC, Moose Jaw Skip: Carl Battell; Third: Frank Smith; Second: Pallie Pascoe; Lead: Jim McDonald

== Round Robin standings ==
Key
Teams to Tiebreaker

Province	Skip	W	L	PF	PA
Manitoba	Jim Congalton	5	2	81	73
Alberta	Arthur Hallonquist	5	2	83	71
Nova Scotia	Murray Macneill	4	3	74	70
Ontario	Charles Bulley	4	3	72	83
Northern Ontario	A.E. Stephenson	3	4	72	69
New Brunswick	Nicholas Thibodeau	3	4	80	75
Quebec	Peter Lyall	2	5	62	87
Saskatchewan	Carl Battell	2	5	72	68

== Round Robin results ==
=== Draw 1 ===
Sheet A	1	2	3	4	5	6	7	8	9	10	11	12	Final
Manitoba (Congalton)	2	1	0	6	3	0	0	4	0	1	X	X	17
Northern Ontario (Stephenson)	0	0	2	0	0	1	2	0	1	0	X	X	6

Sheet B	1	2	3	4	5	6	7	8	9	10	11	12	Final
Ontario (Bulley)	0	0	0	1	0	5	0	6	0	2	1	0	15
Quebec (Lyall)	2	1	2	0	1	0	1	0	1	0	0	1	9

Sheet C	1	2	3	4	5	6	7	8	9	10	11	12	Final
Alberta (Hallonquist)	2	0	2	0	2	0	1	1	0	0	2	1	11
Saskatchewan (Battell)	0	1	0	1	0	3	0	0	3	1	0	0	9

Sheet D	1	2	3	4	5	6	7	8	9	10	11	12	Final
New Brunswick (Thibodeau)	2	0	0	2	3	2	1	3	0	0	1	0	14
Nova Scotia (Macneill)	0	2	1	0	0	0	0	0	2	2	0	2	9

=== Draw 2 ===
Sheet A	1	2	3	4	5	6	7	8	9	10	11	12	Final
Manitoba (Congalton)	1	0	1	0	2	0	3	2	2	1	0	0	12
Alberta (Hallonquist)	0	1	0	5	0	1	0	0	0	0	1	3	11

Sheet B	1	2	3	4	5	6	7	8	9	10	11	12	Final
Quebec (Lyall)	2	0	3	2	2	2	0	2	0	0	0	1	14
Saskatchewan (Battell)	0	2	0	0	0	0	2	0	2	1	3	0	10

Sheet C	1	2	3	4	5	6	7	8	9	10	11	12	Final
Nova Scotia (Macneill)	0	3	1	2	4	0	2	1	0	2	X	X	15
Ontario (Bulley)	2	0	0	0	0	2	0	0	1	0	X	X	5

Sheet D	1	2	3	4	5	6	7	8	9	10	11	12	Final
Northern Ontario (Stephenson)	2	1	0	2	0	0	0	1	1	1	4	2	14
New Brunswick (Thibodeau)	0	0	1	0	3	2	1	0	0	0	0	0	7

=== Draw 3 ===
Sheet A	1	2	3	4	5	6	7	8	9	10	11	12	Final
Ontario (Bulley)	0	5	0	1	2	2	2	1	0	0	0	0	13
Alberta (Hallonquist)	1	0	5	0	0	0	0	0	2	1	2	1	12

Sheet B	1	2	3	4	5	6	7	8	9	10	11	12	Final
Saskatchewan (Battell)	4	2	0	0	5	0	4	1	0	1	X	X	17
Manitoba (Congalton)	0	0	1	1	0	1	0	0	2	0	X	X	5

Sheet C	1	2	3	4	5	6	7	8	9	10	11	12	Final
Nova Scotia (Macneill)	0	1	1	0	1	0	0	2	0	2	1	2	10
Northern Ontario (Stephenson)	1	0	0	2	0	1	1	0	2	0	0	0	7

Sheet D	1	2	3	4	5	6	7	8	9	10	11	12	Final
New Brunswick (Thibodeau)	0	3	0	0	0	1	0	1	1	3	1	1	11
Quebec (Lyall)	1	0	1	2	1	0	3	0	0	0	0	0	8

=== Draw 4 ===
Sheet A	1	2	3	4	5	6	7	8	9	10	11	12	Final
Nova Scotia (Macneill)	1	1	0	1	2	0	1	0	3	0	0	2	11
Manitoba (Congalton)	0	0	1	0	0	1	0	3	0	1	4	0	10

Sheet B	1	2	3	4	5	6	7	8	9	10	11	12	Final
Ontario (Bulley)	0	1	0	1	2	1	0	2	2	0	0	1	10
Northern Ontario (Stephenson)	1	0	1	0	0	0	1	0	0	1	2	0	6

Sheet C	1	2	3	4	5	6	7	8	9	10	11	12	Final
New Brunswick (Thibodeau)	0	0	2	1	1	1	2	0	2	1	1	X	11
Saskatchewan (Battell)	1	1	0	0	0	0	0	1	0	0	0	X	3

Sheet D	1	2	3	4	5	6	7	8	9	10	11	12	Final
Alberta (Hallonquist)	1	0	0	3	0	4	2	2	0	0	0	0	12
Quebec (Lyall)	0	1	1	0	1	0	0	0	2	2	1	1	9

=== Draw 5 ===
Sheet A	1	2	3	4	5	6	7	8	9	10	11	12	Final
Nova Scotia (Macneill)	1	0	1	0	0	1	3	0	4	3	0	X	13
Saskatchewan (Battell)	0	1	0	2	2	0	0	3	0	0	1	X	9

Sheet B	1	2	3	4	5	6	7	8	9	10	11	12	Final
Northern Ontario (Stephenson)	2	4	1	4	2	2	0	0	1	1	X	X	17
Quebec (Lyall)	0	0	0	0	0	0	1	1	0	0	X	X	2

Sheet C	1	2	3	4	5	6	7	8	9	10	11	12	Final
Manitoba (Congalton)	0	0	0	2	1	3	0	2	1	0	0	3	12
Ontario (Bulley)	1	3	2	0	0	0	2	0	0	1	1	0	10

Sheet D	1	2	3	4	5	6	7	8	9	10	11	12	13	Final
Alberta (Hallonquist)	0	0	0	3	1	0	3	0	1	1	2	0	1	12
New Brunswick (Thibodeau)	1	1	2	0	0	3	0	2	0	0	0	2	0	11

=== Draw 6 ===
Sheet A	1	2	3	4	5	6	7	8	9	10	11	12	Final
Alberta (Hallonquist)	0	2	0	0	2	1	3	0	1	0	4	X	13
Nova Scotia (Macneill)	1	0	2	1	0	0	0	2	0	1	0	X	7

Sheet B	1	2	3	4	5	6	7	8	9	10	11	12	Final
Ontario (Bulley) 🔨	0	0	2	0	3	2	0	2	0	4	0	4	17
New Brunswick (Thibodeau)	1	4	0	3	0	0	5	0	1	0	2	0	16

Sheet C	1	2	3	4	5	6	7	8	9	10	11	12	Final
Manitoba (Congalton)	1	0	1	1	1	5	0	1	0	1	2	0	13
Quebec (Lyall)	0	3	0	0	0	0	3	0	1	0	0	1	8

Sheet D	1	2	3	4	5	6	7	8	9	10	11	12	Final
Northern Ontario (Stephenson)	0	1	0	2	0	3	1	0	2	1	0	2	12
Saskatchewan (Battell)	2	0	2	0	3	0	0	1	0	0	3	0	11

=== Draw 7 ===
Sheet A	1	2	3	4	5	6	7	8	9	10	11	12	Final
Manitoba (Congalton)	0	0	0	0	2	3	1	3	0	0	0	3	12
New Brunswick (Thibodeau)	1	1	1	1	0	0	0	0	2	3	1	0	10

Sheet B	1	2	3	4	5	6	7	8	9	10	11	12	Final
Alberta (Hallonquist)	1	2	0	2	1	0	0	2	0	3	1	0	12
Northern Ontario (Stephenson)	0	0	2	0	0	1	3	0	3	0	0	1	10

Sheet C	1	2	3	4	5	6	7	8	9	10	11	12	Final
Quebec (Lyall)	3	0	0	3	0	1	1	1	0	3	0	0	12
Nova Scotia (Macneill)	0	2	2	0	1	0	0	0	2	0	1	1	9

Sheet D	1	2	3	4	5	6	7	8	9	10	11	12	Final
Saskatchewan (Battell)	1	1	2	0	2	0	4	1	1	1	X	X	13
Ontario (Bulley)	0	0	0	1	0	1	0	0	0	0	X	X	2

== Tiebreaker ==
Sheet A	1	2	3	4	5	6	7	8	9	10	11	12	Final
Manitoba (Congalton)	0	3	1	0	2	1	0	1	1	0	1	3	13
Alberta (Hallonquist)	4	0	0	2	0	0	1	0	0	1	0	0	8
