= Lionel Wood =

Canadian curler

- Curler
- Born: June 2, 1889; Winnipeg, Manitoba, Canada
- Died: September 17, 1965 (aged 66); Winnipeg, Manitoba, Canada
Medal record
Representing Manitoba
Macdonald Brier
Gold medal – first place	1930 Toronto

Lionel Elmer Wood (June 2, 1899 – September 17, 1965) was a Canadian curler. He was the lead of the 1930 Brier Champion team (skipped by his brother Pappy Wood), representing Manitoba.
