= Jim Williams (curler) =

Canadian curler

- Curler
- Born: May 7, 1915; Roblin, Manitoba
- Died: September 3, 1987 (aged 72); Dauphin, Manitoba

Team
- Curling club: Dauphin Curling Club

Curling career
- Brier: 1953
Medal record
Representing Manitoba
Macdonald Brier
Gold medal – first place	1953 Sudbury

James Alfred "Ping" Williams (May 7, 1915 – September 3, 1987) was a Canadian curler. He was the third of the 1953 Brier Champion team (skipped by Ab Gowanlock), representing Manitoba.
