= 1942 Macdonald Brier =

Canadian men's curling championship

- Host city: Quebec City, Quebec
- Arena: Quebec Arena
- Dates: March 2–5
- Winner: Manitoba
- Curling club: Strathcona CC, Winnipeg
- Skip: Ken Watson
- Third: Grant Watson
- Second: Charles Scrymgeour
- Lead: James Grant

The 1942 Macdonald Brier, the Canadian men's national curling championship, was held from March 2 to 5, 1942 at Quebec Arena in Quebec City, Quebec.

Team Manitoba, skipped by Ken Watson, won the Brier Tankard by finishing round robin play with an 8-1 record. This was Manitoba's tenth Brier championship overall and the second Brier won by Watson's rink, who won their first Brier in 1936.

Both British Columbia and Ontario would finish tied for second with 7-2 records, which would have necessitated a tiebreaker playoff under Brier rules at the time. However, due to the Quebec Aces hockey team needing the arena for their QSHL playoffs on March 7, it was announced that no tiebreaker playoff would be played and that the tie for second place would be allowed to stand. This prevented a showdown between brothers Gordon and Donald Campbell were skipping Ontario and BC respectively.

For the first time since the 1933 Brier, none of the games went to an extra end.

Quebec's loss in Draw 8 against British Columbia was their 22nd straight loss in Brier competition, setting a record for most consecutive Brier losses. The record was previously held by Prince Edward Island, who had lost 21 straight Brier games from 1937 to 1939. Quebec's losing streak would eventually reach 25 games before they would win a game again in 1946.

Due to the onset of World War II, the 1942 Brier would be the last Brier to be played until 1946. This would also be the only opportunity that Quebec Arena would host a Brier as the arena burnt down a few months later.

Conditions at the Arena were considered "tricky, almost unplayable".

== Teams ==
The teams are listed as follows:

Alberta	British Columbia	Manitoba	New Brunswick	Northern Ontario
Viking CC, Viking Skip: John Slavik; Third: Vincent Slavik; Second: Cecil Runyon; Lead: Kenneth Hilliker	Vancouver CC, Vancouver Skip: Donald A. Campbell; Third: Francis Avery; Second: Robert Henderson; Lead: George Law	Strathcona CC, Winnipeg Skip: Ken Watson; Third: Grant Watson; Second: Charles Scrymgeour; Lead: James Grant	Bathurst CC, Bathurst Skip: Daniel Connolly; Third: Joseph Connolly; Second: John Kennah; Lead: Aurele Landry	Sudbury CC, Sudbury Skip: William McMitchell; Third: Albert Cooper Jr. Second: Don Groom; Lead: Albert Cooper Sr.
Nova Scotia	Ontario	Prince Edward Island	Quebec	Saskatchewan
Bridgewater CC, Bridgewater Skip: Irving Hebb; Third: Norman Rafuse; Second: Warner Bickle; Lead: Frank Cook	Thistle CC, Hamilton Skip: Gordon M. Campbell; Third: Duncan A. Campbell; Second: William Kennedy; Lead: Rufus Stone	Charlottetown CC, Charlottetown Skip: Russ Cruikshank; Third: Harry Sear; Second: Reginald Bell; Lead: Donald Gass	Huntingdon CC, Huntingdon Skip: John Ross Jr. Third: Erle Martin; Second: Christopher Newman; Lead: John Carr	Rosetown CC, Rosetown Skip: John Franklin; Third: Fraser Heartwell; Second: John Lang; Lead: John Sansom

== Round-robin standings ==
Key
Brier champion

Province	Skip	W	L	PF	PA
Manitoba	Ken Watson	8	1	109	71
British Columbia	Donald A. Campbell	7	2	111	88
Ontario	Gordon M. Campbell	7	2	114	82
New Brunswick	Daniel Connolly	6	3	106	77
Alberta	John Slavik	5	4	91	83
Saskatchewan	John Franklin	4	5	89	74
Northern Ontario	William McMitchell	4	5	87	89
Prince Edward Island	Russ Cruikshank	3	6	69	107
Nova Scotia	Irving Hebb	1	8	66	110
Quebec	John Ross Jr.	0	9	50	111

== Round-robin results ==
=== Draw 1 ===
Sheet A	1	2	3	4	5	6	7	8	9	10	11	12	Final
Alberta (Slavik)	1	1	0	1	1	0	3	0	5	0	3	X	15
Prince Edward Island (Cruikshank)	0	0	1	0	0	1	0	1	0	1	0	X	4

Sheet B	1	2	3	4	5	6	7	8	9	10	11	12	Final
Manitoba (Watson)	0	3	1	0	1	1	0	1	1	1	2	0	11
Nova Scotia (Hebb)	2	0	0	1	0	0	1	0	0	0	0	1	5

Sheet C	1	2	3	4	5	6	7	8	9	10	11	12	Final
Saskatchewan (Franklin)	1	2	0	0	0	3	0	0	0	0	0	0	6
Ontario (G. Campbell)	0	0	1	2	1	0	1	1	1	2	0	1	10

Sheet D	1	2	3	4	5	6	7	8	9	10	11	12	Final
British Columbia (D. Campbell)	0	1	1	0	0	1	2	0	1	0	3	1	10
Northern Ontario (McMitchell)	2	0	0	2	5	0	0	2	0	2	0	0	13

Sheet E	1	2	3	4	5	6	7	8	9	10	11	12	Final
Quebec (Ross)	0	0	4	0	0	0	0	0	0	2	0	0	6
New Brunswick (Connolly)	5	1	0	1	1	1	1	2	4	0	1	1	18

=== Draw 2 ===
Sheet A	1	2	3	4	5	6	7	8	9	10	11	12	Final
Saskatchewan (Franklin)	3	1	0	1	1	0	0	1	0	3	1	0	11
Alberta (Slavik)	0	0	2	0	0	0	2	0	1	0	0	1	6

Sheet B	1	2	3	4	5	6	7	8	9	10	11	12	Final
Northern Ontario (McMitchell)	1	0	2	0	1	0	0	0	0	2	0	4	10
Manitoba (Watson)	0	3	0	2	0	3	1	3	3	0	4	0	19

Sheet C	1	2	3	4	5	6	7	8	9	10	11	12	Final
New Brunswick (Connolly)	0	5	3	1	0	0	4	0	2	1	0	1	17
British Columbia (D. Campbell)	1	0	0	0	3	1	0	1	0	0	1	0	7

Sheet D	1	2	3	4	5	6	7	8	9	10	11	12	Final
Nova Scotia (Hebb)	1	0	0	2	0	0	3	3	1	0	2	0	12
Ontario (G. Campbell)	0	1	2	0	1	3	0	0	0	4	0	3	14

Sheet E	1	2	3	4	5	6	7	8	9	10	11	12	Final
Quebec (Ross)	0	0	2	2	1	1	0	0	0	3	0	0	9
Prince Edward Island (Cruikshank)	1	2	0	0	0	0	3	1	3	0	1	1	12

=== Draw 3 ===
Sheet A	1	2	3	4	5	6	7	8	9	10	11	12	Final
Manitoba (Watson)	2	0	0	2	0	0	3	0	3	1	3	1	15
New Brunswick (Connolly)	0	2	1	0	2	1	0	1	0	0	0	0	7

Sheet B	1	2	3	4	5	6	7	8	9	10	11	12	Final
Quebec (Ross)	0	1	1	0	0	0	0	1	0	0	0	0	3
Saskatchewan (Franklin)	1	0	0	4	1	1	0	0	1	3	1	2	14

Sheet C	1	2	3	4	5	6	7	8	9	10	11	12	Final
Ontario (G. Campbell)	1	0	4	0	0	2	2	1	2	0	0	1	13
Northern Ontario (McMitchell)	0	2	0	1	4	0	0	0	0	0	1	0	8

Sheet D	1	2	3	4	5	6	7	8	9	10	11	12	Final
Prince Edward Island (Cruikshank)	0	1	2	0	0	0	0	1	0	1	1	1	7
British Columbia (D. Campbell)	2	0	0	2	2	3	1	0	3	0	0	0	13

Sheet E	1	2	3	4	5	6	7	8	9	10	11	12	Final
Nova Scotia (Hebb)	0	1	1	0	1	0	1	0	2	1	0	2	9
Alberta (Slavik)	3	0	0	3	0	1	0	2	0	0	3	0	12

=== Draw 4 ===
Sheet A	1	2	3	4	5	6	7	8	9	10	11	12	Final
British Columbia (D. Campbell)	0	4	0	2	0	0	1	2	0	2	4	0	15
Nova Scotia (Hebb)	1	0	1	0	2	1	0	0	3	0	0	1	9

Sheet B	1	2	3	4	5	6	7	8	9	10	11	12	Final
Prince Edward Island (Cruikshank)	0	0	0	0	1	0	2	1	0	0	X	X	4
Ontario (G. Campbell)	4	1	1	1	0	6	0	0	4	5	X	X	22

Sheet C	1	2	3	4	5	6	7	8	9	10	11	12	Final
Northern Ontario (McMitchell)	0	1	0	4	2	0	4	0	0	3	3	0	17
Quebec (Ross)	1	0	1	0	0	1	0	1	0	0	0	0	4

Sheet D	1	2	3	4	5	6	7	8	9	10	11	12	Final
Alberta (Slavik)	1	0	1	1	2	0	0	0	1	0	1	1	8
New Brunswick (Connolly)	0	1	0	0	0	1	1	1	0	3	0	0	7

Sheet E	1	2	3	4	5	6	7	8	9	10	11	12	Final
Manitoba (Watson)	0	1	0	3	0	1	0	0	0	1	0	3	9
Saskatchewan (Franklin)	1	0	2	0	2	0	0	1	1	0	1	0	8

=== Draw 5 ===
Sheet A	1	2	3	4	5	6	7	8	9	10	11	12	Final
Saskatchewan (Franklin)	0	1	1	0	3	0	0	1	0	1	0	0	7
New Brunswick (Connolly)	1	0	0	2	0	1	3	0	2	0	3	1	13

Sheet B	1	2	3	4	5	6	7	8	9	10	11	12	Final
British Columbia (D. Campbell)	0	4	0	1	1	0	2	1	0	0	5	X	14
Ontario (G. Campbell)	1	0	3	0	0	1	0	0	1	1	0	X	7

Sheet C	1	2	3	4	5	6	7	8	9	10	11	12	Final
Alberta (Slavik)	2	0	2	0	2	0	0	2	0	0	2	0	10
Northern Ontario (McMitchell)	0	1	0	1	0	1	0	0	1	2	0	2	8

Sheet D	1	2	3	4	5	6	7	8	9	10	11	12	Final
Manitoba (Watson)	0	3	0	1	0	1	0	1	0	1	1	0	8
Quebec (Ross)	2	0	1	0	1	0	1	0	1	0	0	1	7

Sheet E	1	2	3	4	5	6	7	8	9	10	11	12	Final
Prince Edward Island (Cruikshank)	1	1	0	4	1	0	0	2	0	2	1	3	15
Nova Scotia (Hebb)	0	0	1	0	0	2	1	0	3	0	0	0	7

=== Draw 6 ===
Sheet A	1	2	3	4	5	6	7	8	9	10	11	12	Final
Quebec (Ross)	0	1	0	0	0	1	0	0	0	1	3	0	6
Nova Scotia (Hebb)	1	0	0	1	0	0	1	2	1	0	0	1	7

Sheet B	1	2	3	4	5	6	7	8	9	10	11	12	Final
Saskatchewan (Franklin)	0	1	0	0	2	0	0	0	0	3	0	1	7
Prince Edward Island (Cruikshank)	2	0	1	1	0	1	1	2	1	0	1	0	10

Sheet C	1	2	3	4	5	6	7	8	9	10	11	12	Final
Alberta (Slavik)	0	1	0	3	0	3	0	3	0	2	1	0	13
Ontario (G. Campbell)	1	0	3	0	1	0	5	0	1	0	0	3	14

Sheet D	1	2	3	4	5	6	7	8	9	10	11	12	Final
British Columbia (D. Campbell)	0	0	3	0	0	4	2	1	1	1	1	0	13
Manitoba (Watson)	2	3	0	1	2	0	0	0	0	0	0	3	11

Sheet E	1	2	3	4	5	6	7	8	9	10	11	12	Final
Northern Ontario (McMitchell)	2	0	0	0	0	2	0	1	0	0	3	0	8
New Brunswick (Connolly)	0	2	0	1	2	0	1	0	1	2	0	1	10

=== Draw 7 ===
Sheet A	1	2	3	4	5	6	7	8	9	10	11	12	Final
Alberta (Slavik)	2	0	1	0	0	2	2	1	0	1	0	1	10
Quebec (Ross)	0	1	0	1	1	0	0	0	1	0	1	0	5

Sheet B	1	2	3	4	5	6	7	8	9	10	11	12	Final
Manitoba (Watson)	3	1	0	0	1	2	1	1	2	0	0	0	11
Ontario (G. Campbell)	0	0	1	2	0	0	0	0	0	2	2	1	8

Sheet C	1	2	3	4	5	6	7	8	9	10	11	12	Final
Saskatchewan (Franklin)	0	0	2	0	3	0	1	0	2	0	0	3	11
British Columbia (D. Campbell)	1	1	0	1	0	3	0	2	0	1	3	0	12

Sheet D	1	2	3	4	5	6	7	8	9	10	11	12	Final
New Brunswick (Connolly)	0	2	0	0	2	0	1	1	0	3	1	0	10
Prince Edward Island (Cruikshank)	0	0	1	1	0	1	0	0	3	0	0	1	7

Sheet E	1	2	3	4	5	6	7	8	9	10	11	12	Final
Nova Scotia (Hebb)	0	2	0	1	0	0	0	0	1	0	2	X	6
Northern Ontario (McMitchell)	1	0	2	0	1	1	1	1	0	1	0	X	8

=== Draw 8 ===
Sheet A	1	2	3	4	5	6	7	8	9	10	11	12	Final
Saskatchewan (Franklin)	2	2	1	0	0	4	0	0	0	1	2	3	15
Nova Scotia (Hebb)	0	0	0	1	1	0	1	1	2	0	0	0	6

Sheet B	1	2	3	4	5	6	7	8	9	10	11	12	Final
Quebec (Ross)	0	0	1	1	1	0	0	1	0	0	0	2	6
British Columbia (D. Campbell)	2	0	0	0	0	3	1	0	2	2	3	0	13

Sheet C	1	2	3	4	5	6	7	8	9	10	11	12	Final
Manitoba (Watson)	3	1	0	0	0	1	0	0	0	1	1	4	11
Alberta (Slavik)	0	0	1	2	2	0	2	2	1	0	0	0	10

Sheet D	1	2	3	4	5	6	7	8	9	10	11	12	Final
Ontario (G. Campbell)	0	2	0	0	4	3	1	0	0	0	3	1	14
New Brunswick (Connolly)	1	0	2	1	0	0	0	2	2	2	0	0	10

Sheet E	1	2	3	4	5	6	7	8	9	10	11	12	Final
Northern Ontario (McMitchell)	1	1	1	0	0	4	0	1	0	1	0	1	10
Prince Edward Island (Cruikshank)	0	0	0	2	2	0	1	0	1	0	1	0	7

=== Draw 9 ===
Sheet A	1	2	3	4	5	6	7	8	9	10	11	12	Final
Prince Edward Island (Cruikshank)	1	0	0	2	0	0	0	0	0	0	0	X	3
Manitoba (Watson)	0	3	2	0	3	1	1	1	1	1	1	X	14

Sheet B	1	2	3	4	5	6	7	8	9	10	11	12	Final
Ontario (G. Campbell)	0	1	2	1	2	0	2	0	1	1	2	X	12
Quebec (Ross)	1	0	0	0	0	1	0	2	0	0	0	X	4

Sheet C	1	2	3	4	5	6	7	8	9	10	11	12	Final
Saskatchewan (Franklin)	1	0	0	0	3	2	0	0	1	1	1	1	10
Northern Ontario (McMitchell)	0	0	2	1	0	0	1	1	0	0	0	0	5

Sheet D	1	2	3	4	5	6	7	8	9	10	11	12	Final
New Brunswick (Connolly)	2	3	0	1	1	0	0	3	1	3	0	0	14
Nova Scotia (Hebb)	0	0	1	0	0	1	1	0	0	0	1	1	5

Sheet E	1	2	3	4	5	6	7	8	9	10	11	12	Final
British Columbia (D. Campbell)	1	1	2	0	0	0	4	0	2	0	4	X	14
Alberta (Slavik)	0	0	0	3	0	1	0	1	0	2	0	X	7
