= Russ Jackman =

Canadian curler

- Curler
- Born: October 10, 1929; Winnipeg, Manitoba
- Died: July 17, 2025 (aged 95)
Medal record
Representing Manitoba
Macdonald Brier
| Gold medal – first place | 1953 Sudbury |

Russell Howard Jackman (October 10, 1929 – July 17, 2025) was a Canadian curler. He was the lead of the 1953 Brier Champion team (skipped by Ab Gowanlock), representing Manitoba.

Jackman began curling in 1944.

Jackman and his wife Eleanor were due to marry on March 5, 1953, but their wedding had to be postponed following his rink's victory at the 1953 Manitoba championship, qualifying the team for that year's Brier which was held the same week of their planned wedding.

He was inducted into the Manitoba Sports Hall of Fame in 2019.

== Personal life ==
Jackman was the son of George and Rose. After living in Dauphin, he moved to Calgary in the mid-1960s, before he and his wife Eleanor moved back to Winnipeg in the 1970s, settling in the Windsor Park neighbourhood. He had three children. He worked for Sherwin-Williams Paints, Jordan & Ste-Michelle Cellars, T.G. Bright Wines and Cartier Wines. In addition to curling, he played fastball in the summer.

A member of the Dauphin, Manitoba Elks of Canada branch He served as "Grand Exalted Ruler" of the organization from 1974 to 1975.
