= 1953 Macdonald Brier =

Canadian men's curling championship

- Host city: Sudbury, Ontario
- Arena: Sudbury Arena
- Dates: March 2–7
- Attendance: 12,500
- Winner: Manitoba
- Curling club: Dauphin CC, Dauphin
- Skip: Ab Gowanlock
- Third: Jim Williams
- Second: Art Pollon
- Lead: Russ Jackman
- Finalist: Quebec

The 1953 Macdonald Brier, the Canadian men's national curling championship, was held from March 2 to 7, 1953 at Sudbury Arena in Sudbury, Ontario. A total of 12,500 fans attended the event.

Both Team Manitoba and Team Quebec finished round robin play tied with 8-2 records, necessitating a tiebreaker playoff to determine the Brier championship. Manitoba, skipped by Ab Gowanlock, defeated Quebec in the playoff 8–6 to capture the Brier Tankard. This was Manitoba's fourteenth Brier championship and Gowanlock's second title as a skip, with his other title having been in 1938.

The 15 years between Brier championships by Gowanlock set a record for the longest gap between Brier championships by a skip, which to date is still a record. The title gap is also still a record by any player (since equaled by Steve Gould in 1996 and 2011 as a lead (Note: Gould was an alternate for Jeff Stoughton's championship rink in 1999, but did not play any games during that Brier. Curling Canada excludes alternates from their records, therefore Gould also had 15 years between Brier championships instead of 12.)). At 52 years of age, Gowanlock is to date the oldest Brier winning skip in history.

== Event Summary ==
Heading into the final draw, Quebec was sitting at 8–1 with Saskatchewan still left to play. Manitoba had already completed their round robin portion with an 8–2 record, thus drawing a bye in the final draw. All Quebec needed was a victory over Saskatchewan to capture their first Brier championship while Manitoba needed a Quebec loss to force a tiebreaker to decide the Brier championship.

In the final draw, Quebec led 3-1 after four ends, but Saskatchewan would score three in the fifth end and go on to steal three more in the next two ends and eventually won 9–5 to force a tiebreaker between Manitoba and Quebec for the Brier championship.

In the tiebreaker, Quebec led Manitoba 2-1 after four ends. Manitoba then scored one in the fifth end to tie the game and steal one in the sixth and two in the seventh to take a 5–2 lead. Quebec responded with three in the eighth and a steal of one in the ninth to take a 6–5 lead. Manitoba tied the game in the tenth and took a 7–6 lead after a steal of one in the eleventh. Even though Quebec had shot rock in the last end, Manitoba would go onto steal one more and win 8–6 to capture their fourteenth Brier championship and the second for Gowanlock as skip.

== Teams ==
The teams are listed as follows:

Alberta	British Columbia	Manitoba	New Brunswick
The Glencoe Club, Calgary Skip: Leonard Haw; Third: Frederick Agnew; Second: David Haggarty; Lead: Edward Miller	Trail CC, Trail Skip: Reg Stone; Third: Roy Stone; Second: Douglas McGibney; Lead: Hunt McKay	Dauphin CC, Dauphin Skip: Ab Gowanlock; Third: Jim Williams; Second: Art Pollon; Lead: Russ Jackman	Beaver CC, Moncton Skip: Ralph Noble; Third: Horace Trites; Second: Albert Eagles; Lead: Harris Mitton
Newfoundland	Northern Ontario	Nova Scotia	Ontario
St. John's CC, St. John's Skip: Norman Rockwell; Third: Lewis Ayre; Second: Jack Stoneman; Lead: Wilbert Howell	Port Arthur CC, Thunder Bay Skip: Grant Watson; Third: Don McEwen; Second: Frank Sargent; Lead: Archibald Grant	Bridgewater CC, Bridgewater Skip: Bernard Haines; Third: Ralph Simmons; Second: Pennell Richardson; Lead: Lee Rhodenizer	Chatham Granite Club, Chatham Skip: Peter Gilbert; Third: Gord Gilbert; Second: Robert Gilbert; Lead: James Harrington
Prince Edward Island	Quebec	Saskatchewan
Charlottetown CC, Charlottetown Skip: Frank Acorn; Third: Stewart Moore; Second: Charles Kydd; Lead: James Campbell	St. George CC, Westmount Skip: Kenneth Weldon; Third: Ches McCance; Second: William Isaac; Lead: James Turney	Delisle CC, Delisle Skip: James Hill; Third: John Bentley; Second: Harold Worth Jr. Lead: Elmer MacNevin

== Round robin standings ==
Key
Teams to Tiebreaker Playoff

Province	Skip	W	L	PF	PA
Quebec	Kenneth Weldon	8	2	99	74
Manitoba	Ab Gowanlock	8	2	121	80
Saskatchewan	James Hill	7	3	114	83
British Columbia	Reg Stone	7	3	127	91
Northern Ontario	Grant Watson	7	3	111	87
Alberta	Leonard Haw	6	4	111	84
Nova Scotia	Bernard Haines	5	5	100	95
Ontario	Peter Gilbert	4	6	91	97
New Brunswick	Ralph Noble	2	8	71	118
Prince Edward Island	Frank Acorn	1	9	77	127
Newfoundland	Norman Rockwell	0	10	70	156

== Round robin results ==
=== Draw 1 ===
Sheet A	1	2	3	4	5	6	7	8	9	10	11	12	Final
Newfoundland (Rockwell)	0	0	0	0	0	0	2	2	0	0	0	3	7
Saskatchewan (Hill)	3	1	1	1	1	4	0	0	3	3	1	0	18

Sheet B	1	2	3	4	5	6	7	8	9	10	11	12	Final
Manitoba (Gowanlock)	1	1	0	2	0	0	1	1	0	2	1	0	9
Nova Scotia (Haines)	0	0	1	0	3	2	0	0	1	0	0	1	8

Sheet C	1	2	3	4	5	6	7	8	9	10	11	12	Final
New Brunswick (Noble)	0	1	0	0	0	2	1	1	0	1	0	0	6
Alberta (Haw)	1	0	3	1	2	0	0	0	4	0	1	1	13

Sheet D	1	2	3	4	5	6	7	8	9	10	11	12	Final
Prince Edward Island (Acorn)	0	0	0	2	0	1	0	1	0	1	0	0	5
Northern Ontario (Watson)	1	2	3	0	1	0	2	0	1	0	2	2	14

Sheet E	1	2	3	4	5	6	7	8	9	10	11	12	Final
British Columbia (Stone)	1	0	5	0	0	2	1	0	2	1	0	2	14
Quebec (Weldon)	0	2	0	0	1	0	0	1	0	0	1	0	5

=== Draw 2 ===
Sheet A	1	2	3	4	5	6	7	8	9	10	11	12	Final
Northern Ontario (Watson)	2	0	2	0	0	0	0	1	0	0	X	X	5
Saskatchewan (Hill)	0	2	0	1	2	2	1	0	6	1	X	X	15

Sheet B	1	2	3	4	5	6	7	8	9	10	11	12	Final
Newfoundland (Rockwell)	1	1	1	0	2	0	1	0	0	1	0	1	8
British Columbia (Stone)	0	0	0	2	0	1	0	2	1	0	3	0	9

Sheet C	1	2	3	4	5	6	7	8	9	10	11	12	Final
Prince Edward Island (Acorn)	0	0	1	0	0	3	0	1	0	0	4	1	10
Alberta (Haw)	3	3	0	1	2	0	2	0	2	1	0	0	14

Sheet D	1	2	3	4	5	6	7	8	9	10	11	12	Final
Ontario (Gilbert)	0	0	0	0	1	2	0	0	0	3	0	3	9
Quebec (Weldon)	2	1	1	2	0	0	1	1	2	0	1	0	11

Sheet E	1	2	3	4	5	6	7	8	9	10	11	12	Final
Manitoba (Gowanlock)	1	2	0	2	1	0	4	1	0	2	1	0	14
New Brunswick (Noble)	0	0	1	0	0	1	0	0	2	0	0	2	6

=== Draw 3 ===
Sheet A	1	2	3	4	5	6	7	8	9	10	11	12	Final
Ontario (Gilbert)	0	0	2	2	0	2	1	0	2	3	3	0	15
Newfoundland (Rockwell)	0	1	0	0	2	0	0	2	0	0	0	1	6

Sheet B	1	2	3	4	5	6	7	8	9	10	11	12	Final
Saskatchewan (Hill)	0	1	0	0	0	0	1	0	0	2	0	1	5
Alberta (Haw)	1	0	1	0	1	2	0	1	2	0	2	0	10

Sheet C	1	2	3	4	5	6	7	8	9	10	11	12	Final
Manitoba (Gowanlock)	1	1	4	0	3	0	2	1	0	0	0	2	14
Prince Edward Island (Acorn)	0	0	0	2	0	2	0	0	2	2	1	0	9

Sheet D	1	2	3	4	5	6	7	8	9	10	11	12	Final
Nova Scotia (Haines)	0	2	0	3	0	2	1	0	1	1	0	1	11
New Brunswick (Noble)	1	0	2	0	1	0	0	1	0	0	2	0	7

Sheet E	1	2	3	4	5	6	7	8	9	10	11	12	Final
Northern Ontario (Watson)	0	0	2	0	1	0	0	1	0	4	2	1	11
British Columbia (Stone)	3	3	0	3	0	2	1	0	2	0	0	0	14

=== Draw 4 ===
Sheet A	1	2	3	4	5	6	7	8	9	10	11	12	Final
Quebec (Weldon)	2	2	2	0	1	1	2	1	2	0	1	1	15
Newfoundland (Rockwell)	0	0	0	1	0	0	0	0	0	1	0	0	2

Sheet B	1	2	3	4	5	6	7	8	9	10	11	12	Final
Nova Scotia (Haines)	0	2	0	2	0	0	2	3	0	1	0	2	12
Prince Edward Island (Acorn)	1	0	3	0	3	1	0	0	1	0	1	0	10

Sheet C	1	2	3	4	5	6	7	8	9	10	11	12	Final
Northern Ontario (Watson)	3	0	0	0	5	1	1	0	0	3	0	1	14
Ontario (Gilbert)	0	3	0	1	0	0	0	1	1	0	1	0	7

Sheet D	1	2	3	4	5	6	7	8	9	10	11	12	Final
Alberta (Haw)	1	0	1	0	2	1	3	0	2	0	0	1	11
British Columbia (Stone)	0	3	0	1	0	0	0	1	0	4	1	0	10

Sheet E	1	2	3	4	5	6	7	8	9	10	11	12	Final
Manitoba (Gowanlock)	2	2	1	1	1	2	0	0	5	0	0	0	14
Saskatchewan (Hill)	0	0	0	0	0	0	3	2	0	1	0	0	6

=== Draw 5 ===
Sheet A	1	2	3	4	5	6	7	8	9	10	11	12	Final
Northern Ontario (Watson)	0	0	1	1	0	0	2	0	0	1	0	0	5
Quebec (Weldon)	2	0	0	0	0	1	0	1	0	0	1	2	7

Sheet B	1	2	3	4	5	6	7	8	9	10	11	12	Final
Manitoba (Gowanlock)	1	0	3	0	1	1	0	3	0	1	0	0	10
British Columbia (Stone)	0	1	0	1	0	0	2	0	1	0	3	1	9

Sheet C	1	2	3	4	5	6	7	8	9	10	11	12	13	Final
New Brunswick (Noble)	0	0	1	0	1	0	3	0	1	1	0	1	2	10
Prince Edward Island (Acorn)	0	2	0	1	0	2	0	2	0	0	1	0	0	8

Sheet D	1	2	3	4	5	6	7	8	9	10	11	12	Final
Nova Scotia (Haines)	0	0	1	1	0	3	1	0	1	0	0	4	11
Saskatchewan (Hill)	2	2	0	0	1	0	0	1	0	1	0	0	7

Sheet E	1	2	3	4	5	6	7	8	9	10	11	12	Final
Ontario (Gilbert)	2	0	2	0	1	1	0	1	1	0	2	0	10
Alberta (Haw)	0	1	0	2	0	0	1	0	0	3	0	1	8

=== Draw 6 ===
Sheet A	1	2	3	4	5	6	7	8	9	10	11	12	Final
Northern Ontario (Watson)	1	3	1	3	1	0	2	4	0	0	1	0	16
Newfoundland (Rockwell)	0	0	0	0	0	1	0	0	2	1	0	6	10

Sheet B	1	2	3	4	5	6	7	8	9	10	11	12	Final
Saskatchewan (Hill)	2	0	1	0	6	2	1	2	0	3	0	0	17
New Brunswick (Noble)	0	1	0	1	0	0	0	0	1	0	2	1	6

Sheet C	1	2	3	4	5	6	7	8	9	10	11	12	Final
Manitoba (Gowanlock)	2	0	1	0	2	0	3	2	2	0	0	0	12
Ontario (Gilbert)	0	1	0	3	0	1	0	0	0	1	2	1	9

Sheet D	1	2	3	4	5	6	7	8	9	10	11	12	Final
Quebec (Weldon)	1	0	2	0	1	0	0	2	2	0	2	0	10
Alberta (Haw)	0	1	0	2	0	1	1	0	0	2	0	2	9

Sheet E	1	2	3	4	5	6	7	8	9	10	11	12	13	Final
British Columbia (Stone)	2	0	1	0	1	2	1	0	0	0	1	0	1	9
Nova Scotia (Haines)	0	1	0	1	0	0	0	1	1	3	0	1	0	8

=== Draw 7 ===
Sheet A	1	2	3	4	5	6	7	8	9	10	11	12	Final
British Columbia (Stone)	0	2	1	0	2	0	1	1	2	0	3	0	12
New Brunswick (Noble)	1	0	0	1	0	1	0	0	0	1	0	1	5

Sheet B	1	2	3	4	5	6	7	8	9	10	11	12	Final
Alberta (Haw)	3	2	2	0	1	2	3	2	0	0	2	0	17
Newfoundland (Rockwell)	0	0	0	3	0	0	0	0	2	1	0	1	7

Sheet C	1	2	3	4	5	6	7	8	9	10	11	12	Final
Saskatchewan (Hill)	1	0	0	3	1	0	1	0	1	0	2	0	9
Prince Edward Island (Acorn)	0	1	1	0	0	0	0	1	0	1	0	1	5

Sheet D	1	2	3	4	5	6	7	8	9	10	11	12	Final
Nova Scotia (Haines)	1	0	1	0	0	0	2	2	1	0	0	1	8
Ontario (Gilbert)	0	1	0	1	1	0	0	0	0	1	1	0	5

Sheet E	1	2	3	4	5	6	7	8	9	10	11	12	Final
Quebec (Weldon)	1	1	1	0	0	2	0	0	2	0	0	1	8
Manitoba (Gowanlock)	0	0	0	1	1	0	1	2	0	1	1	0	7

=== Draw 8 ===
Sheet A	1	2	3	4	5	6	7	8	9	10	11	12	Final
British Columbia (Stone)	0	3	4	1	1	5	4	2	1	4	0	0	25
Prince Edward Island (Acorn)	1	0	0	0	0	0	0	0	0	0	5	1	7

Sheet B	1	2	3	4	5	6	7	8	9	10	11	12	Final
Quebec (Weldon)	0	0	2	1	3	2	0	2	1	0	1	2	14
Nova Scotia (Haines)	4	1	0	0	0	0	1	0	0	1	0	0	7

Sheet C	1	2	3	4	5	6	7	8	9	10	11	12	Final
Manitoba (Gowanlock)	0	3	1	0	2	4	0	5	2	0	4	1	22
Newfoundland (Rockwell)	1	0	0	1	0	0	1	0	0	2	0	0	5

Sheet D	1	2	3	4	5	6	7	8	9	10	11	12	Final
Ontario (Gilbert)	0	0	1	1	2	0	1	1	1	0	1	0	8
New Brunswick (Noble)	0	1	0	0	0	4	0	0	0	1	0	1	7

Sheet E	1	2	3	4	5	6	7	8	9	10	11	12	13	Final
Northern Ontario (Watson)	0	0	1	1	1	0	2	0	1	0	0	2	1	9
Alberta (Haw)	1	1	0	0	0	2	0	2	0	1	1	0	0	8

=== Draw 9 ===
Sheet A	1	2	3	4	5	6	7	8	9	10	11	12	Final
Nova Scotia (Haines)	2	1	4	4	0	2	1	0	3	3	0	0	20
Newfoundland (Rockwell)	0	0	0	0	1	0	0	2	0	0	3	2	8

Sheet B	1	2	3	4	5	6	7	8	9	10	11	12	Final
Quebec (Weldon)	1	1	0	3	0	4	0	2	2	1	0	0	14
New Brunswick (Noble)	0	0	1	0	1	0	1	0	0	0	2	1	6

Sheet C	1	2	3	4	5	6	7	8	9	10	11	12	Final
Ontario (Gilbert)	2	0	1	2	0	2	1	0	0	3	0	0	11
Prince Edward Island (Acorn)	0	1	0	0	1	0	0	1	0	0	3	1	7

Sheet D	1	2	3	4	5	6	7	8	9	10	11	12	Final
Saskatchewan (Hill)	2	0	2	0	4	3	0	3	0	0	1	3	18
British Columbia (Stone)	0	3	0	2	0	0	3	0	1	2	0	0	11

Sheet E	1	2	3	4	5	6	7	8	9	10	11	12	Final
Northern Ontario (Watson)	0	4	0	0	3	2	0	0	1	0	2	2	14
Manitoba (Gowanlock)	2	0	1	1	0	0	2	1	0	2	0	0	9

=== Draw 10 ===
Sheet A	1	2	3	4	5	6	7	8	9	10	11	12	Final
Quebec (Weldon)	0	2	0	1	2	0	0	1	1	1	2	0	10
Prince Edward Island (Acorn)	1	0	1	0	0	2	1	0	0	0	0	1	6

Sheet B	1	2	3	4	5	6	7	8	9	10	11	12	Final
Manitoba (Gowanlock)	0	1	1	3	0	0	1	0	0	2	0	2	10
Alberta (Haw)	1	0	0	0	1	1	0	2	0	0	1	0	6

Sheet C	1	2	3	4	5	6	7	8	9	10	11	12	Final
Northern Ontario (Watson)	0	2	1	0	4	0	1	0	2	0	1	0	11
Nova Scotia (Haines)	0	0	0	2	0	1	0	1	0	3	0	1	8

Sheet D	1	2	3	4	5	6	7	8	9	10	11	12	Final
Saskatchewan (Hill)	1	2	0	0	1	1	1	0	1	0	3	0	10
Ontario (Gilbert)	0	0	2	1	0	0	0	1	0	1	0	4	9

Sheet E	1	2	3	4	5	6	7	8	9	10	11	12	Final
New Brunswick (Noble)	1	0	0	1	0	0	4	4	0	0	2	2	14
Newfoundland (Rockwell)	0	1	2	0	2	2	0	0	1	1	0	0	9

=== Draw 11 ===
Sheet A	1	2	3	4	5	6	7	8	9	10	11	12	Final
Northern Ontario (Watson)	0	1	0	2	3	2	0	0	1	1	0	2	12
New Brunswick (Noble)	1	0	1	0	0	0	0	1	0	0	1	0	4

Sheet B	1	2	3	4	5	6	7	8	9	10	11	12	Final
British Columbia (Stone)	3	1	0	1	0	2	0	2	1	3	0	1	14
Ontario (Gilbert)	0	0	4	0	2	0	1	0	0	0	1	0	8

Sheet C	1	2	3	4	5	6	7	8	9	10	11	12	Final
Saskatchewan (Hill)	0	0	1	0	3	2	1	0	0	0	2	0	9
Quebec (Weldon)	1	1	0	1	0	0	0	0	1	0	0	1	5

Sheet D	1	2	3	4	5	6	7	8	9	10	11	12	Final
Alberta (Haw)	0	2	2	2	0	2	0	0	1	2	4	0	15
Nova Scotia (Haines)	1	0	0	0	3	0	1	1	0	0	0	1	7

Sheet E	1	2	3	4	5	6	7	8	9	10	11	12	Final
Prince Edward Island (Acorn)	0	1	0	2	2	0	1	0	0	0	2	2	10
Newfoundland (Rockwell)	1	0	1	0	0	2	0	1	2	1	0	0	8

== Playoff ==
Sheet C	1	2	3	4	5	6	7	8	9	10	11	12	Final
Manitoba (Gowanlock)	0	1	0	0	1	1	2	0	0	1	1	1	8
Quebec (Weldon)	0	0	0	2	0	0	0	3	1	0	0	0	6
