= Victor Wood (curler) =

Canadian curler

- Curler
- Born: August 28, 1886; Winnipeg, Manitoba
- Died: September 10, 1979 (aged 93); Winnipeg, Manitoba
Medal record
Representing Manitoba
Macdonald Brier
Gold medal – first place	1930 Toronto

Adwin Victor Wilson Wood (August 28, 1886 – September 10, 1979) was a Canadian curler. He was the second of the 1930 Brier Champion team (skipped by his brother Pappy Wood), representing Manitoba.
