= Art Pollon =

Canadian curler

- Curler
- Born: August 20, 1914; Dauphin, Manitoba
- Died: March 28, 2009 (aged 94); Salmon Arm, British Columbia
Medal record
Representing Manitoba
Macdonald Brier
Gold medal – first place	1953 Sudbury

William Arthur Pollon (August 20, 1914 – March 28, 2009) was a Canadian curler. He was the second of the 1953 Brier Champion team (skipped by Ab Gowanlock), representing Manitoba.
