= Ken Watson =

Canadian curler

- Curler
- Born: August 12, 1904; Minnedosa, Manitoba
- Died: July 26, 1986 (aged 81); Saint Boniface, Manitoba
Medal record
Representing Manitoba
Macdonald Brier
Gold medal – first place	1936 Toronto
Gold medal – first place	1942 Quebec City
Gold medal – first place	1949 Hamilton

James Kenneth Watson, CM (August 12, 1904 – July 26, 1986) was a Canadian curler.

== Biography ==
Watson was born in Minnedosa, Manitoba and moved to Winnipeg later. He was the first man to skip his rink to three Brier championships in 1936, 1942 and 1949.

After his career as a curler ended, he became a sports broadcaster, co-hosting CBC Championship Curling with Alex Trebek in 1966. He died in St. Boniface, Manitoba.

== Honours ==
- 1969 – inducted into the national Sports Hall of Fame
- 1973 – elected to the Canadian Curling Hall of Fame
- 1975 – made a Member of the Order of Canada
- 1978 – Elmer Freytag Award
- 1980 - inducted into the Manitoba Sports Hall of Fame and Museum
- 2016 - designated a National Historic Person

== Books ==
- Ken Watson on Curling, 1950
