= Jimmy Congalton =

Canadian curler

- Curler
- Born: September 26, 1879; Guelph, Ontario
- Died: October 10, 1947 (aged 68); Winnipeg, Manitoba

Curling career
- Brier: 2 (1930, 1932)
Medal record
Representing Manitoba
Macdonald Brier
Gold medal – first place	1930 Toronto
Gold medal – first place	1932 Toronto

James A. Congalton (September 26, 1879 – October 10, 1947) was a Canadian curler. He was a member of the 1930 (third) and 1932 (skip) Brier Champion teams, representing Manitoba. He was a 1975 inductee to the Canadian Curling Hall of Fame. He died suddenly in 1947.
