= Murray Macneill =

Canadian curler (1877–1951)

Dr. Murray Macneill
- Curler
- Born: January 7, 1877; Maitland, Nova Scotia
- Died: February 16, 1951 (aged 74); Halifax, Nova Scotia

Team
- Curling club: Halifax CC, Halifax, NS

Curling career
- Brier: 4 (1927, 1930, 1932, 1936)
Medal record
Representing Nova Scotia
Macdonald Brier
Gold medal – first place	1927 Toronto
Bronze medal – third place	1932 Toronto

Murray Macneill (also spelled MacNeill) (January 7, 1877 – February 16, 1951) was a curler from Nova Scotia. He is the first skip to win the Brier, Canada's national men's curling championship in 1927.

Originally from Pictou County, he attended Pictou Academy and graduated from Dalhousie University in 1896. He began curling in his back yard while he was a boy in Saint John, New Brunswick. He was always competitive and went on to become one of the top curlers in Maritime Canada. After he became a professor of mathematics at Dalhousie University, Macneill was selected to be skip of the Nova Scotia team at the first Canadian Men's Curling Championship, held in the first week of March 1927 at the Granite Curling Club in Toronto.

Curling games had a marathon aspect at that time, being of 14 ends duration. Macneill and his team started well, winning four of their first five games, and then, in the last draw, came back from an eight-point deficit to capture the championship, which, before the next year's event came to be known as The Brier.

Macneill returned to the Brier in 1930, 1932 and 1936. Macneill was also a first cousin of author Lucy Maud Montgomery.

Macneill served as president of the Canadian Curling Association from 1948 to 1949. He died of pancreatic cancer in 1951, aged 74.

== Brier record ==
Brier	W	L	Finish
1927	6	1	1st
1930	4	5	T4th
1932	4	3	T3rd
1936	1	8	9th
Totals	15	17	
