= 1936 Macdonald Brier =

Canadian men's curling championship

- Host city: Toronto, Ontario
- Arena: Granite Curling Club
- Dates: March 2–5
- Winner: Manitoba
- Curling club: Stratchcona CC, Winnipeg
- Skip: Ken Watson
- Third: Grant Watson
- Second: Marvin MacIntyre
- Lead: Charles Kerr

The 1936 Macdonald Brier, the Canadian men's national curling championship, was held from March 2 to 5, 1936 at the Granite Club in Toronto, Ontario. This was the first Brier in which teams from British Columbia and Prince Edward Island would participate, increasing the field from 8 to 10 teams. This arrangement remained until 1951 when Newfoundland was added to the Brier field.

Team Manitoba, skipped by Ken Watson, captured the Brier Tankard with a round robin record of 8-1. This was Manitoba's seventh Brier championship overall and the first of three titles for Watson as a skip. A tiebreaker game was played to determine the runner-up, as both Team Alberta and Team New Brunswick finished the round robin with 7-2 records. Alberta defeated New Brunswick 8-6 in the tiebreaker to finish runner-up.

Watson's rink also set a Brier record for most points scored in a tournament (142) which still stands as of 2024. Watson and his rink steamrolled through the competition thanks to their long slides, which caused controversy at the competition. Up until then, most curlers delivered their stones with a foot still in the hack, however the Watson rink slid out from the hack. Despite their dominance, they did not claim the Brier title until their final round robin game against New Brunswick. With both teams having identical 7–1 records at the time, the match attracted the largest Brier crowd in history up to that point. The game was fairly lacklustre, however the last end was not. Watson had to draw against three New Brunswick stones on his last rock to claim the championship.

== Teams ==
The teams are listed as follows:

Alberta	British Columbia	Manitoba	New Brunswick	Northern Ontario
Granite CC, Edmonton Skip: George Wanless; Third: Billy Rose; Second: Dave Ritchie; Lead: William Murray	Vancouver CC, Vancouver Skip: William Whalen Sr. Third: William Whalen Jr. Second: J.W. Nation; Lead: W.R. Broatch	Strathcona CC, Winnipeg Skip: Ken Watson; Third: Grant Watson; Second: Marvin MacIntyre; Lead: Charles Kerr	Campbellton CC, Campbellton Skip: Reginald Shives; Third: Earl Mowatt; Second: Frederick J. McRae; Lead: Harold Perley	Haileybury CC, Haileybury Skip: Emmett Smith; Third: Daniel Millar; Second: William Beecroft; Lead: Melvin Robb
Nova Scotia	Ontario	Prince Edward Island	Quebec	Saskatchewan
Halifax CC, Halifax Skip: Murray Macneill; Third: J.R. Murphy; Second: Charles Burchell; Lead: A.L. Harrington	Sarnia CC, Sarnia Skip: Hector Cowan; Third: William McCart; Second: Alex Hayes; Lead: Murray Chilton	Montague CC, Montague Skip: James McIntyre; Third: C.K. Wightman; Second: R.W. Beck; Lead: I.A. Younker	Victoria CC, Quebec City Skip: C.B. Bignell; Third: Gordon Ross Jr. Second: K.O. Baptist; Lead: Lionel Roy	Regina CC, Regina Skip: Leslie Youngson; Third: David Clayton; Second: Charles Gardner Jr. Lead: C.A. McNevin

== Round Robin standings ==
Key
Brier champion
Teams to Tiebreaker

Province	Skip	W	L	PF	PA
Manitoba	Ken Watson	8	1	142	59
New Brunswick	Reginald Shives	7	2	110	77
Alberta	George Wanless	7	2	103	80
British Columbia	William Whalen Sr.	6	3	90	80
Ontario	Hector Cowan	5	4	96	85
Northern Ontario	Emmett Smith	5	4	95	80
Saskatchewan	Leslie Youngson	4	5	87	94
Quebec	C.B. Bignell	2	7	77	137
Nova Scotia	Murray Macneill	1	8	78	111
Prince Edward Island	James McIntyre	0	9	72	147

== Round Robin results ==
=== Draw 1 ===
Sheet A	1	2	3	4	5	6	7	8	9	10	11	12	Final
Northern Ontario (Smith)	1	0	0	2	0	0	0	2	0	3	0	0	8
New Brunswick (Shives)	0	2	2	0	2	1	1	0	2	0	1	2	13

Sheet B	1	2	3	4	5	6	7	8	9	10	11	12	Final
Ontario (Cowan)	0	1	0	0	0	1	0	0	0	0	1	0	3
Manitoba (Watson)	4	0	4	1	3	0	4	1	2	1	0	1	21

Sheet C	1	2	3	4	5	6	7	8	9	10	11	12	Final
Saskatchewan (Youngson)	0	0	3	1	1	0	0	2	1	1	1	2	12
Quebec (Bignell)	3	1	0	0	0	1	1	0	0	0	0	0	6

Sheet D	1	2	3	4	5	6	7	8	9	10	11	12	Final
Alberta (Wanless)	1	1	0	2	4	1	2	3	0	0	1	0	15
Nova Scotia (Macneill)	0	0	1	0	0	0	0	0	2	1	0	1	5

Sheet E	1	2	3	4	5	6	7	8	9	10	11	12	Final
British Columbia (Whalen)	0	2	1	1	1	0	1	3	0	2	0	0	11
Prince Edward Island (McIntyre)	1	0	0	0	0	2	0	0	1	0	1	1	6

=== Draw 2 ===
Sheet A	1	2	3	4	5	6	7	8	9	10	11	12	Final
Manitoba (Watson)	2	0	2	0	0	2	0	3	2	2	1	0	14
Alberta (Wanless)	0	1	0	1	1	0	2	0	0	0	0	1	6

Sheet B	1	2	3	4	5	6	7	8	9	10	11	12	Final
New Brunswick (Shives)	1	0	1	1	0	0	3	0	2	0	0	3	11
Saskatchewan (Youngson)	0	1	0	0	1	2	0	1	0	1	2	0	8

Sheet C	1	2	3	4	5	6	7	8	9	10	11	12	Final
British Columbia (Whalen)	0	0	2	0	0	0	4	2	1	3	1	0	13
Quebec (Bignell)	1	2	0	1	3	1	0	0	0	0	0	3	11

Sheet D	1	2	3	4	5	6	7	8	9	10	11	12	Final
Ontario (Cowan)	2	1	0	5	0	0	0	5	1	3	0	0	17
Prince Edward Island (McIntyre)	0	0	1	0	2	1	2	0	0	0	3	1	10

Sheet E	1	2	3	4	5	6	7	8	9	10	11	12	Final
Nova Scotia (Macneill)	0	1	0	3	0	0	0	0	2	0	2	2	10
Northern Ontario (Smith)	1	0	1	0	1	1	3	3	0	1	0	0	11

=== Draw 3 ===
Sheet A	1	2	3	4	5	6	7	8	9	10	11	12	Final
Alberta (Wanless)	0	2	1	0	2	4	0	2	0	4	0	1	16
Prince Edward Island (McIntyre)	1	0	0	1	0	0	1	0	2	0	3	0	8

Sheet B	1	2	3	4	5	6	7	8	9	10	11	12	Final
Manitoba (Watson)	1	0	1	0	1	0	1	1	0	0	0	1	6
Northern Ontario (Smith)	0	2	0	3	0	1	0	0	1	1	2	0	10

Sheet C	1	2	3	4	5	6	7	8	9	10	11	12	Final
Saskatchewan (Youngson)	3	0	3	1	1	0	0	3	0	2	1	0	14
Nova Scotia (Macneill)	0	1	0	0	0	1	1	0	1	0	0	2	6

Sheet D	1	2	3	4	5	6	7	8	9	10	11	12	Final
Ontario (Cowan)	2	0	3	2	0	1	0	2	1	3	4	1	19
Quebec (Bignell)	0	1	0	0	1	0	1	0	0	0	0	0	3

Sheet E	1	2	3	4	5	6	7	8	9	10	11	12	Final
British Columbia (Whalen)	0	0	1	0	1	1	0	2	0	3	1	3	12
New Brunswick (Shives)	0	4	0	1	0	0	1	0	2	0	0	0	8

=== Draw 4 ===
Sheet A	1	2	3	4	5	6	7	8	9	10	11	12	Final
Alberta (Wanless)	0	0	0	0	0	0	1	0	3	0	0	0	4
New Brunswick (Shives)	2	1	3	1	1	2	0	2	0	3	1	1	17

Sheet B	1	2	3	4	5	6	7	8	9	10	11	12	Final
Prince Edward Island (McIntyre)	0	0	1	0	0	1	0	2	1	0	1	0	6
Saskatchewan (Youngson)	1	4	0	3	3	0	1	0	0	5	0	1	18

Sheet C	1	2	3	4	5	6	7	8	9	10	11	12	Final
Northern Ontario (Smith)	3	1	0	3	2	0	0	0	3	1	3	0	16
Quebec (Bignell)	0	0	1	0	0	1	1	1	0	0	0	3	7

Sheet D	1	2	3	4	5	6	7	8	9	10	11	12	Final
British Columbia (Whalen)	0	0	0	1	2	0	0	2	0	0	0	1	6
Manitoba (Watson)	1	1	2	0	0	1	1	0	2	1	4	0	13

Sheet E	1	2	3	4	5	6	7	8	9	10	11	12	Final
Nova Scotia (Macneill)	0	0	0	0	0	3	0	0	1	0	0	1	5
Ontario (Cowan)	1	3	1	1	2	0	1	1	0	1	3	0	14

=== Draw 5 ===
Sheet A	1	2	3	4	5	6	7	8	9	10	11	12	Final
Nova Scotia (Macneill)	1	1	0	0	0	0	0	3	0	0	2	0	7
British Columbia (Whalen)	0	0	3	1	1	1	1	0	1	2	0	1	11

Sheet B	1	2	3	4	5	6	7	8	9	10	11	12	Final
Alberta (Wanless)	3	0	1	0	0	0	4	0	2	2	4	0	16
Saskatchewan (Youngson)	0	1	0	1	1	3	0	1	0	0	0	1	8

Sheet C	1	2	3	4	5	6	7	8	9	10	11	12	Final
Prince Edward Island (McIntyre)	0	0	1	0	1	0	0	0	2	0	3	0	7
New Brunswick (Shives)	3	2	0	1	0	3	1	2	0	1	0	3	16

Sheet D	1	2	3	4	5	6	7	8	9	10	11	12	Final
Manitoba (Watson)	3	0	3	1	0	2	3	0	2	2	2	5	23
Quebec (Bignell)	0	1	0	0	2	0	0	1	0	0	0	0	4

Sheet E	1	2	3	4	5	6	7	8	9	10	11	12	13	Final
Northern Ontario (Smith)	0	2	0	0	1	0	1	2	0	1	0	1	0	8
Ontario (Cowan)	1	0	2	3	0	1	0	0	1	0	0	0	1	9

=== Draw 6 ===
Sheet A	1	2	3	4	5	6	7	8	9	10	11	12	Final
Ontario (Cowan)	0	0	2	0	2	0	0	3	0	1	0	1	9
New Brunswick (Shives)	1	1	0	1	0	1	1	0	4	0	2	0	11

Sheet B	1	2	3	4	5	6	7	8	9	10	11	12	Final
British Columbia (Whalen)	0	0	1	0	0	2	0	2	1	0	3	0	9
Saskatchewan (Youngson)	1	1	0	1	1	0	2	0	0	2	0	2	10

Sheet C	1	2	3	4	5	6	7	8	9	10	11	12	Final
Manitoba (Watson)	2	2	1	0	1	0	0	4	0	1	0	3	14
Nova Scotia (Macneill)	0	0	0	2	0	2	1	0	2	0	2	0	9

Sheet D	1	2	3	4	5	6	7	8	9	10	11	12	Final
Quebec (Bignell)	0	0	0	1	4	1	0	4	1	5	0	0	16
Prince Edward Island (McIntyre)	3	1	2	0	0	0	3	0	0	0	3	1	13

Sheet E	1	2	3	4	5	6	7	8	9	10	11	12	13	Final
Alberta (Wanless)	0	1	0	0	3	0	0	0	0	2	1	1	1	9
Northern Ontario (Smith)	1	0	1	2	0	1	1	1	1	0	0	0	0	8

=== Draw 7 ===
Sheet A	1	2	3	4	5	6	7	8	9	10	11	12	Final
Saskatchewan (Youngson)	0	2	0	0	0	0	0	0	2	0	1	0	5
Northern Ontario (Smith)	1	0	3	1	1	2	1	3	0	1	0	1	14

Sheet B	1	2	3	4	5	6	7	8	9	10	11	12	Final
New Brunswick (Shives)	0	0	1	0	0	1	0	3	2	1	0	2	10
Nova Scotia (Macneill)	1	1	0	2	1	0	2	0	0	0	2	0	9

Sheet C	1	2	3	4	5	6	7	8	9	10	11	12	Final
British Columbia (Whalen)	0	0	3	0	1	1	2	0	2	0	1	0	10
Ontario (Cowan)	1	2	0	1	0	0	0	1	0	1	0	1	7

Sheet D	1	2	3	4	5	6	7	8	9	10	11	12	Final
Quebec (Bignell)	0	2	1	0	0	0	0	1	0	1	2	0	7
Alberta (Wanless)	2	0	0	1	0	2	4	0	3	0	0	2	14

Sheet E	1	2	3	4	5	6	7	8	9	10	11	12	Final
Manitoba (Watson)	7	3	2	0	2	0	3	3	0	1	2	2	25
Prince Edward Island (McIntyre)	0	0	0	1	0	3	0	0	1	0	0	0	5

=== Draw 8 ===
Sheet A	1	2	3	4	5	6	7	8	9	10	11	12	Final
Saskatchewan (Youngson)	0	0	1	0	1	0	0	2	0	1	2	0	7
Manitoba (Watson)	2	2	0	3	0	4	2	0	1	0	0	1	15

Sheet B	1	2	3	4	5	6	7	8	9	10	11	12	Final
Prince Edward Island (McIntyre)	1	0	0	1	0	1	0	0	0	3	2	0	8
Nova Scotia (Macneill)	0	3	1	0	4	0	1	1	3	0	0	2	15

Sheet C	1	2	3	4	5	6	7	8	9	10	11	12	Final
New Brunswick (Shives)	0	3	2	3	1	1	0	0	2	0	3	0	15
Quebec (Bignell)	2	0	0	0	0	0	1	1	0	1	0	4	9

Sheet D	1	2	3	4	5	6	7	8	9	10	11	12	Final
Alberta (Wanless)	2	1	1	0	2	0	4	0	0	1	0	1	12
Ontario (Cowan)	0	0	0	1	0	1	0	2	1	0	2	0	7

Sheet E	1	2	3	4	5	6	7	8	9	10	11	12	Final
British Columbia (Whalen)	1	1	0	1	0	2	0	3	2	0	0	2	12
Northern Ontario (Smith)	0	0	1	0	2	0	1	0	0	2	1	0	7

=== Draw 9 ===
Sheet A	1	2	3	4	5	6	7	8	9	10	11	12	Final
Manitoba (Watson)	1	2	0	0	4	0	0	1	0	2	0	1	11
New Brunswick (Shives)	0	0	1	2	0	2	1	0	2	0	1	0	9

Sheet B	1	2	3	4	5	6	7	8	9	10	11	12	Final
Saskatchewan (Youngson)	1	0	0	1	1	0	0	0	2	0	0	0	5
Ontario (Cowan)	0	0	3	0	0	1	1	0	0	1	1	4	11

Sheet C	1	2	3	4	5	6	7	8	9	10	11	12	Final
Alberta (Wanless)	1	0	0	0	1	1	0	1	5	0	0	2	11
British Columbia (Whalen)	0	1	1	1	0	0	1	0	0	1	1	0	6

Sheet D	1	2	3	4	5	6	7	8	9	10	11	12	Final
Prince Edward Island (McIntyre)	1	2	0	0	0	3	0	0	1	0	1	1	9
Northern Ontario (Smith)	0	0	4	1	1	0	1	5	0	1	0	0	13

Sheet E	1	2	3	4	5	6	7	8	9	10	11	12	Final
Quebec (Bignell)	3	0	1	0	5	0	1	0	0	1	0	3	14
Nova Scotia (Macneill)	0	2	0	2	0	1	0	3	3	0	1	0	12

== Tiebreaker ==
Sheet A	1	2	3	4	5	6	7	8	9	10	11	12	Final
Alberta (Wanless)	1	0	2	0	1	1	0	0	1	1	0	1	8
New Brunswick (Shives)	0	1	0	1	0	0	1	2	0	0	1	0	6
